= Chris Dieker =

American football player (born 1987)

No. 5, 14
- Position: Quarterback

Personal information
- Born: July 22, 1987 (age 39); Topeka, Kansas, U.S.
- Listed height: 6 ft 5 in (1.96 m)
- Listed weight: 235 lb (107 kg)

Career information
- High school: Hayden (Topeka)
- College: Southern Illinois
- NFL draft: 2011: undrafted

Career history
- Pittsburgh Steelers (2011)*; Iowa Barnstormers (2012); Cleveland Gladiators (2013–2016); Philadelphia Soul (2016); Beijing Lions (2016); Shenyang Black Rhinos (2018)
- * Offseason or practice squad member only

Awards and highlights
- ArenaBowl champion (2016); China Bowl champion (2016)

Career AFL statistics
- Comp. / Att.: 309 / 505
- Passing yards: 3,380
- TD–INT: 57–21
- QB rating: 91.85
- Rushing TD: 23
- Stats at ArenaFan.com

Chris Dieker (born July 22, 1987) is an American former professional football quarterback who played in the Arena Football League (AFL). He played college football for the Southern Illinois Salukis.

== Early life ==
Born in Topeka, Kansas, the son of Charles and Susan Dieker, Chris attended Topeka's Hayden High School.

== College career ==
Dieker continued his football career at Southern Illinois. Dieker was a 4-year starter for the Salukis, going 20-9 during that time. He helped the Salukis to two conference championships, and was the 3rd quarterback in school history to pass the 5,000-yard mark for his career.

== Professional career ==
Dieker was rated the 30th best quarterback in the 2011 NFL draft by NFLDraftScout.com.

Pre-draft measurables
Height	Weight	40-yard dash	10-yard split	20-yard split	20-yard shuttle	Three-cone drill	Vertical jump	Broad jump
6 ft 5 in (1.96 m)	232 lb (105 kg)	4.92 s	1.69 s	2.82 s	4.44 s	7.30 s	32 in (0.81 m)	9 ft 4 in (2.84 m)
All values from Pro Day

After going undrafted in 2011, Dieker signed with the Pittsburgh Steelers on July 27. He was released by the Steelers on August 4, 2011.

He played for the Iowa Barnstormers of the Arena Football League (AFL) in 2012.

Dieker signed with the AFL's Cleveland Gladiators for 2013. Dieker was serving as the backup to starter Brian Zbydniewski, when Zbydniewski went down with injury, Dieker became the starter for the Gladiators. With the team's playoff hopes dwindling, Dieker delivered a big win for the Gladiators, scoring 8 touchdowns in a win over the Pittsburgh Power, helping keep the Gladiators' playoff hopes alive. He became the starting quarterback in 2016 after the departure of Shane Austin. Dieker was injured in the first game of the 2016 season. On June 10, 2016, Dieker was placed on reassignment.

On June 24, 2016, Dieker was assigned to the Philadelphia Soul of the AFL.

Dieker was selected by the Beijing Lions in the 2016 CAFL draft and was the backup to Luke Collis during the 2016 season. On November 6, 2016, during the first China Bowl, Dieker played wide receiver due to an injury to James Romain. Dieker caught 9 passes for 107 yards and one touchdown as the Lions beat the Qingdao Clipper by a score of 35–34. He also scored a rushing touchdown during the game.

Dieker was selected by the Shenyang Black Rhinos with the first overall pick in the 2017 CAFL draft.

== Career statistics ==
=== AFL ===
Year	Team	Passing							Rushing		
Year	Team	Cmp	Att	Pct	Yds	TD	Int	Rtg	Att	Yds	TD
2012	Iowa	18	39	46.2	246	4	2	71.10	5	17	0
2013	Cleveland	225	354	63.6	2,442	43	11	101.21	67	272	17
2014	Cleveland	38	64	59.4	428	7	4	80.73	23	79	5
2015	Cleveland	9	13	69.2	68	1	0	100.80	4	10	0
2016	Cleveland	19	35	54.3	196	2	4	45.36	3	26	1
Career		309	505	61.2	3,380	57	21	91.85	102	404	23

=== College ===
Year	Team	Passing								Rushing			
Year	Team	Cmp	Att	Pct	Yds	Y/A	TD	Int	Rtg	Att	Yds	Avg	TD
2007	Southern Illinois	1	2	50.0	12	6.0	0	0	100.4	4	30	7.5	0
2008	Southern Illinois	186	326	57.1	2,083	6.4	16	10	120.8	74	119	1.6	3
2009	Southern Illinois	101	173	58.4	1,326	7.7	10	5	136.1	38	77	2.0	3
2010	Southern Illinois	158	256	61.7	1,816	7.1	15	11	132.0	96	272	2.8	6
Career		446	757	58.9	5,237	6.9	41	26	128.8	212	498	2.3	12
