= Patrick Clarke (American football) =

American football player (born 1991)

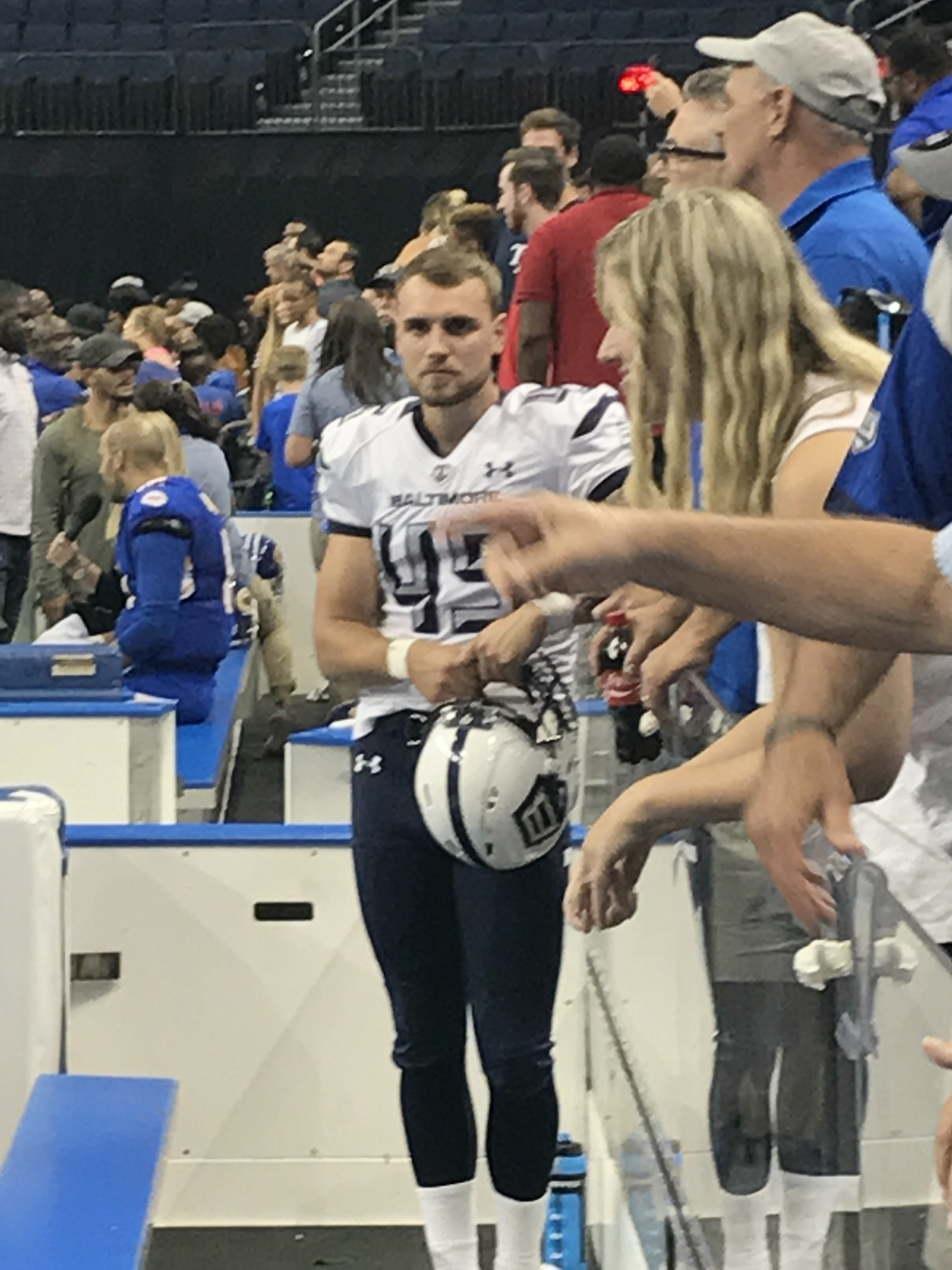
- Clarke with the Baltimore Brigade in 2017

Profile
- Position: Kicker

Personal information
- Born: October 22, 1991 (age 35); New Castle, Delaware, U.S.
- Listed height: 6 ft 3 in (1.91 m)
- Listed weight: 215 lb (98 kg)

Career information
- High school: Delaware Military Academy (Wilmington, Delaware)
- College: Buffalo (2011–2014)
- NFL draft: 2015: undrafted

Career history
- Lehigh Valley Steelhawks (2015); Spokane Empire (2016); Philadelphia Soul (2016); Beijing Lions (2016); Baltimore Brigade (2017); Washington Valor (2018–2019); Philadelphia Soul (2024)*
- * Offseason or practice squad member only

Awards and highlights
- ArenaBowl champion (2018); Second-team All-Arena (2017); China Bowl champion (2016); CAFL All-Pro North Division All-Star (2016)

Career AFL statistics
- FG made: 4
- FG att: 7
- PAT made: 200
- PAT att: 232
- Tackles: 7
- Stats at ArenaFan.com

Patrick Clarke III (born October 22, 1991) is an American professional football placekicker. He has played for the Lehigh Valley Steelhawks, Spokane Empire, Philadelphia Soul, Beijing Lions, Baltimore Brigade, and Washington Valor.

== College career ==
Clarke committed to the University at Buffalo and played four years for the Buffalo Bulls football team. He graduated in 2014 ranked second all-time in field goals made at Buffalo, with 36.

== Professional career ==
Clarke played the 2015 season with the Lehigh Valley Steelhawks of the Professional Indoor Football League. On April 22, 2016, he was signed by the Philadelphia Soul of the Arena Football League. The following day, he made his AFL debut in a 67–50 win over the Cleveland Gladiators, going 7 for 10 on extra point attempts in the game. On May 26, 2016, Clarke signed with the Spokane Empire of the Indoor Football League, and remained with the Empire for the remainder of the 2016 IFL season.

Clarke was selected by the Beijing Lions of the China Arena Football League (CAFL) in the eighteenth round of the 2016 CAFL draft. He earned All-Pro North Division All-Star honors in 2016. After advancing to the 2016 CAFL championship game, Clarke kicked a game-winning 17-yard field goal on the final play to give the Lions a 35–34 win over the Qingdao Clipper in the initial China Bowl. He is listed on the Lions' roster for the 2018 season.

On April 5, 2017, Clarke was assigned to the Baltimore Brigade. He earned Second Team All-Arena honors in 2017.

On March 21, 2018, Clarke was assigned to the Washington Valor. On March 15, 2019, Clarke was again assigned to the Valor.
