= Neal Tivis =

American football player (born 1988)

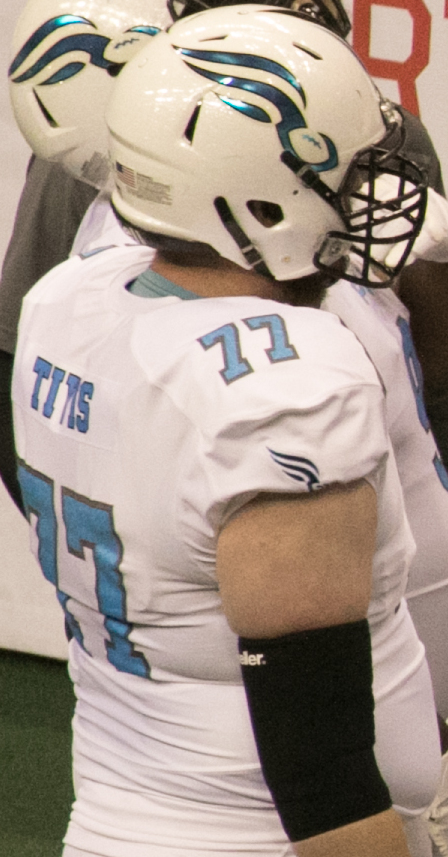
- Tivis with the Philadelphia Soul in 2017

No. 91, 77
- Position: Offensive lineman

Personal information
- Born: November 18, 1988 (age 37); Sanger, Texas, U.S.
- Listed height: 6 ft 5 in (1.96 m)
- Listed weight: 330 lb (150 kg)

Career information
- High school: Sanger
- College: Abilene Christian
- NFL draft: 2012: undrafted

Career history
- Utah Blaze (2012–2013); Philadelphia Soul (2014–2019); Beijing Lions (2016–2018)

Awards and highlights
- 2× ArenaBowl champion (2016, 2017); 2× Second-team All-Arena (2016, 2018); China Bowl champion (2016); CAFL All-Pro North Division All-Star (2016); First-team All-Lone Star (2011); Second-team All-Lone Star (2010)

Career AFL statistics
- Receptions: 4
- Receiving yards: 29
- Receiving TDs: 1
- Special teams TDs: 1
- Stats at ArenaFan.com

Neal Tivis (born November 18, 1988) is an American former professional football player who was an offensive lineman in the Arena Football League (AFL). He played college football for the Abilene Christian Wildcats. He was a member of the Utah Blaze and Philadelphia Soul of the AFL, and the Beijing Lions of the China Arena Football League (CAFL).

== Early life ==
Tivis was born in Sanger, Texas, where he played as a defensive lineman on the Sanger High School football team. During the 2006 season, Tivis recorded 48 tackles, 7 sacks and 1 pass breakup. He made first team All-District 8-3A offensive tackle and defensive end. Tivis was also a first team All-Area selection and a Class 3A honorable mention All-State pick before graduating in 2007.

== College career ==
Tivis played for the Wildcats at Abilene Christian University from 2007 to 2011. He was the team's starter his final two years and helped the Wildcats to 39 wins. He played in 47 games during his career, including 23 starts at tackle. Tivis was named Second Team All-Lone Star Conference as a junior and First Team All-Lone Star Conference as a senior.

=== College statistics ===
Year	Team	Offensive line	
Year	Team	Games played	Games started
2007	Abilene Christian	Redshirt	
2008	Abilene Christian	11	0
2009	Abilene Christian	13	0
2010	Abilene Christian	12	12
2011	Abilene Christian	11	11
Career		47	23

== Professional career ==
Pre-draft measurables
Height	Weight	40-yard dash	10-yard split	20-yard split	20-yard shuttle	Three-cone drill	Vertical jump	Broad jump	Bench press
6 ft 5 in (1.96 m)	308 lb (140 kg)	5.42 s	1.86 s	3.07 s	4.85 s	7.95 s	28.5 in (0.72 m)	8 ft 5 in (2.57 m)	19 reps
All values from Abilene Christian Pro Day

Tivis was invited to the Dallas Cowboys rookie mini-camp as an undrafted free agent, but was not offered a contract.

On June 14, 2012, Tivis was assigned to the Utah Blaze. Tivis started the final six games of the 2012 season for the Blaze. On November 20, 2012, Tivis was assigned to the Blaze for the 2013 season. On June 13, 2013, Tivis was placed on recallable reassignment, but he was activated the next day. On July 23, 2013, Tivis' season ended when he was placed on injured reserve.

Tivis was assigned to the Philadelphia Soul following the Blaze's folding at the conclusion of the 2013 season. Tivis helped anchor the offensive line that led the league in rushing during 2014, 2015, and 2016. At the conclusion of the 2016 regular season, Tivis was named Second Team All-Arena. Tivis helped the Soul to an ArenaBowl XXIX championship. Tivis re-joined the Soul in the middle of the 2017 season on May 16, 2017. On August 26, 2017, the Soul beat the Tampa Bay Storm in ArenaBowl XXX by a score of 44–40.

Tivis was selected by the Beijing Lions of the China Arena Football League (CAFL) in the second round of the 2016 CAFL draft. Tivis was named an All-Pro North Division All-Star and helped the Lions win the first-ever China Bowl. He is listed on the Lions' roster for the 2018 season.
