= Wayne Tribue =

American football player (born 1990)

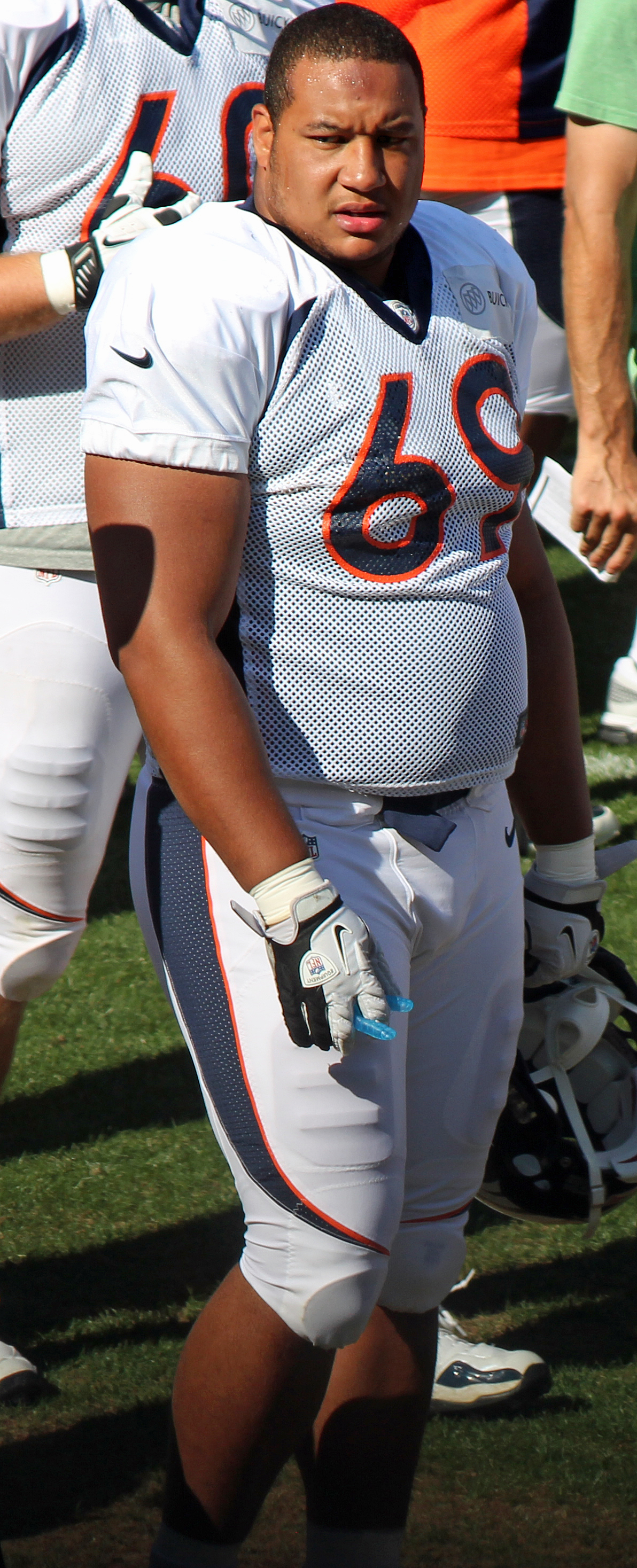
- Tribue with the Denver Broncos in 2012

No. 69
- Position: Guard

Personal information
- Born: April 30, 1990 (age 36); York, Pennsylvania, U.S.
- Listed height: 6 ft 3 in (1.91 m)
- Listed weight: 329 lb (149 kg)

Career information
- High school: York (PA) Central
- College: Temple
- NFL draft: 2012: undrafted

Career history
- Denver Broncos (2012)*; New Orleans Saints (2012)*; San Jose SaberCats (2013)*; San Francisco 49ers (2013)*; Portland Thunder (2014)*; Philadelphia Soul (2014); Dallas Cowboys (2014)*; Jacksonville Sharks (2015); Philadelphia Soul (2016–2018); Beijing Lions (2016)
- * Offseason or practice squad member only

Awards and highlights
- 2× ArenaBowl champion (2016, 2017); AFL Offensive Lineman of the Year (2017); First-team All-Arena (2017); 3× Second-team All-Arena (2014, 2016, 2018); China Bowl champion (2016); CAFL All-Pro North Division All-Star (2016)

Career AFL statistics
- Receptions: 3
- Receiving yards: 19
- Receiving touchdowns: 2
- Total tackles: 1
- Stats at ArenaFan.com

Wayne Luis Tribue (born April 30, 1990) is an American former football guard. He played college football at Temple. He was signed as an undrafted free agent by the Denver Broncos in 2012.

== Professional career ==
Tribue signed with the Denver Broncos as an undrafted free agent following the 2012 NFL draft.

Tribue was signed by the New Orleans Saints on December 17, 2012.

Tribue signed with the San Francisco 49ers on January 23, 2013. He was released by the 49ers on August 31, 2013.

On December 20, 2013, Tribue was selected by the Portland Thunder of the Arena Football League (AFL) during the 2014 AFL Expansion Draft.

On February 20, 2014, Tribue was traded to the Philadelphia Soul for future considerations.

After finished the season with the Soul, Tribue signed with the Dallas Cowboys. The Cowboys waived Tribue on August 26, 2014.

On November 24, 2014, Tribue was assigned to the AFL's Jacksonville Sharks.

On December 3, 2015, Tribue was assigned to the Soul once again. On August 26, 2016, the Soul beat the Arizona Rattlers in ArenaBowl XXIX by a score of 56–42. He earned AFL Offensive Lineman of the Year and First Team All-Arena honors in 2017. On August 26, 2017, the Soul beat the Tampa Bay Storm in ArenaBowl XXX by a score of 44–40.

Tribue was selected by the Beijing Lions of the China Arena Football League (CAFL) in the first round of the 2016 CAFL draft. He earned All-Pro North Division All-Star honors in 2016. He is listed on the Lions' roster for the 2018 season.
