= Ernesto Purnsley =

American football coach

Sacred Heart Pioneers
- Title: Running backs coach

Career information
- Positions: Wide receiver, quarterback
- College: Catawba

Career history
- Concord (WV) (1991) Wide receivers coach; Southern Illinois (1994–1996) Assistant; Charleston Southern (1997) Assistant; Albany Firebirds (1997–1998) Special teams coach and fullback/linebackers coach; Murray State (1998–1999) Running backs coach; Albany/Indiana Firebirds (2000–2002) Special teams coach and fullback/linebackers coach; Colorado Crush (2003–2007) Defensive coordinator; Chicago Rush (2008) Defensive coordinator; Peoria Pirates (2009) Defensive coordinator; Utah Blaze (2010) Head coach; Philadelphia Soul (2011) Defensive coordinator; Iowa Barnstormers (2012–2014) Defensive coordinator; Portland Thunder (2015) Director of player personnel, assistant head coach, and defensive coordinator; Guangzhou Power (2016) Head coach; Sacred Heart (2023–present) Running backs coach

Awards and highlights
- ArenaBowl champion (2005)

Ernesto Purnsley is an American football coach who is the running backs coach for the Sacred Heart Pioneers. He has served as the head coach of the Utah Blaze of the Arena Football League (AFL) and the Guangzhou Power of the China Arena Football League (CAFL). He has also been a defensive coordinator for five different AFL teams.

== Playing career ==
Purnsley played college football at Catawba as a wide receiver and quarterback. He graduated from Catawba in 1990 with a degree in physical education.

== Coaching career ==
Purnsley was the wide receivers coach at Concord College in West Virginia in 1991.

He was an assistant coach for the Southern Illinois Salukis from 1994 to 1996, and the Charleston Southern Buccaneers in 1997.

He was the special teams coach and fullback/linebackers coach for the Albany Firebirds of the Arena Football League (AFL) from 1997 to 1998. Purnsley then served as a running backs coach at Murray State from 1998 to 1999. He returned to the Firebirds, serving in the same role as before, from 2000 to 2002.

Purnsley was the defensive coordinator of the Colorado Crush of the AFL from 2003 to 2007. The Crush won ArenaBowl XIX in 2005.

He was the defensive coordinator of the AFL's Chicago Rush in 2008.

The AFL did not play in 2009, so Purnsley served as the defensive coordinator for the Peoria Pirates of the af2 that year.

On January 26, 2010, he was named the head coach of the Utah Blaze of the AFL. He was fired after starting the season with a 1–6 record.

Purnsley was the defensive coordinator of the AFL's Philadelphia Soul in 2011.

He was then the defensive coordinator of the Iowa Barnstormers of the AFL from 2012 to 2014.

He served as the director of player personnel, assistant head coach, and defensive coordinator for the Portland Thunder of the AFL in 2015.

Purnsley was the head coach of the Guangzhou Power of the China Arena Football League (CAFL) in 2016, compiling a regular season record of 2–3. The Power lost their postseason game to the Shanghai Skywalkers.

He joined the Sacred Heart Pioneers in 2023 as a running backs coach.

=== Head coaching record ===
Team	Year	Regular season				Postseason			
Team	Year	Won	Lost	Win %	Finish	Won	Lost	Win %	Result
Utah	2010	1	6	.143	(Fired)	-	-	-	
Guangzhou	2016	2	3	.400	4th in CAFL	0	1	.000	Lost to Shanghai Skywalkers in 3rd-place game
Total		3	9	.250		0	1	.000	
