= Tyre Glasper =

American football player (born 1987)

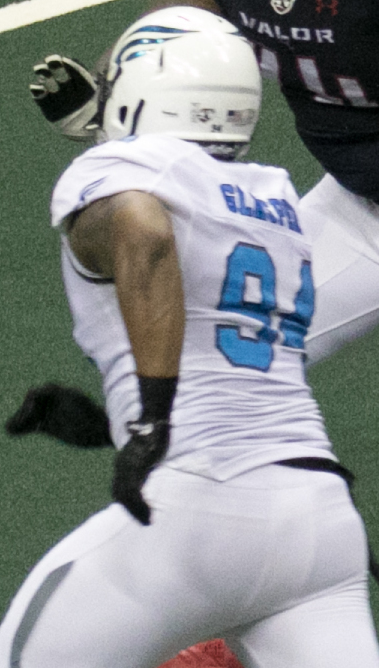
- Glasper with the Philadelphia Soul in 2017

No. 94
- Position: Linebacker

Personal information
- Born: April 14, 1987 (age 39); Detroit, Michigan, U.S.
- Listed height: 6 ft 3 in (1.91 m)
- Listed weight: 265 lb (120 kg)

Career information
- High school: Martin Luther King (Detroit)
- College: North Carolina A&T
- NFL draft: 2010: undrafted

Career history
- Arizona Rattlers (2011–2016); Guangzhou Power (2016); Philadelphia Soul (2017)

Awards and highlights
- 4× ArenaBowl champion (2012–2014, 2017); 2× First-team All-Arena (2015, 2016); CAFL All-Pro South Division All-Star (2016)

Career AFL statistics
- Tackles: 206
- Sacks: 35.5
- Pass breakups: 17
- Forced fumbles: 7
- Stats at ArenaFan.com

Tyre Glasper (born April 14, 1987) is an American former professional football linebacker who played in the Arena Football League (AFL). He played college football at the North Carolina Agricultural and Technical State University.

== Early life ==
Glasper played high school football at Martin Luther King High School in Detroit, Michigan. He was named first-team all-city, first-team all-metro and special mention all-state.

== College career ==
Glasper played for the North Carolina A&T Aggies from 2006 to 2009. Glasper switched to defensive end while with the Aggies, and was twice named preseason All-Mid-Eastern Athletic Conference.

== Professional career ==
Glasper was assigned to the Arizona Rattlers on September 23, 2010, to a two-year contract. Glasper had a solid rookie season recording 7.5 sacks. In just his second season, he helped the Rattlers capture an ArenaBowl XXV Championship. Glasper agreed to a two-year contract with the Rattlers on October 17, 2012. Glasper would continue to be a force on the defense for the Rattlers, helping them to two more ArenaBowl championships in 2013 & 2014.

He was selected by the Guangzhou Power of the China Arena Football League (CAFL) in the fourth round of the 2016 CAFL draft. He earned All-Pro South Division All-Star honors in 2016. He was listed on the Power's roster for the 2018 season.

On May 1, 2017, Glasper was assigned to the Philadelphia Soul. On August 26, 2017, the Soul beat the Tampa Bay Storm in ArenaBowl XXX by a score of 44–40.

=== AFL statistics ===
Legend
	Won the ArenaBowl
**Bold**	Career high

Year	Team										
Year	Team	Tkl	Ast	Sck	PB	FF	FR	Blk	Int	Yds	TD
2011	Arizona	28	**27**	7.5	3	2	2	0	0	0	0
2012	Arizona	**29**	17	4.0	0	**3**	**3**	0	**1**	**16**	0
2013	Arizona	22	22	5.0	**5**	1	2	0	0	0	0
2014	Arizona	20	25	4.0	1	1	0	1	0	0	0
2015	Arizona	28	11	**11.0**	4	0	**3**	**2**	**1**	0	0
2016	Arizona	16	17	4.0	4	0	2	**2**	0	0	0
2017	Philadelphia	2	3	0.0	0	0	0	0	0	0	0
Career		145	122	35.5	17	7	12	5	2	16	0
