= Sean Brackett =

American football player (born 1991)

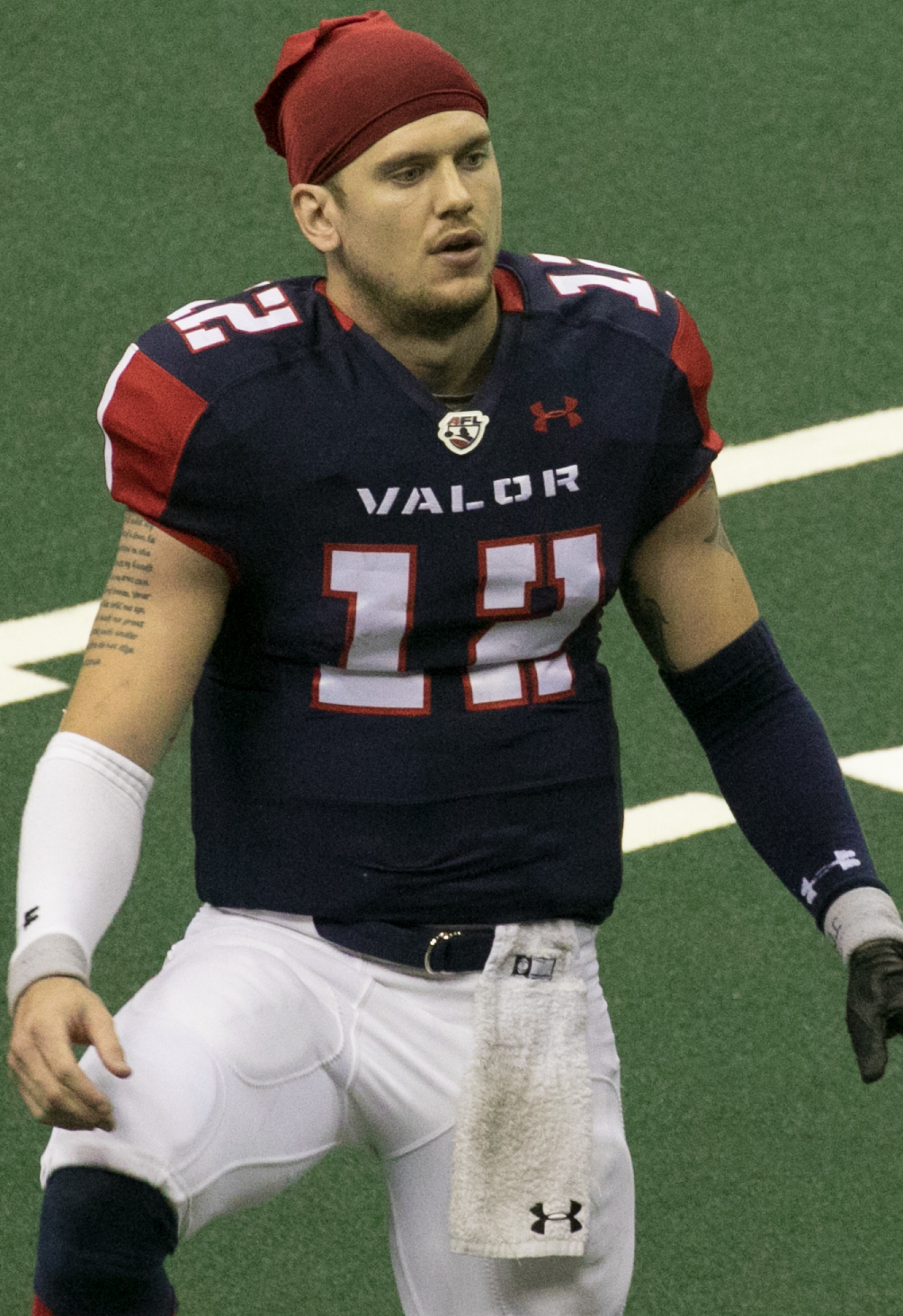
- Brackett with the Washington Valor in 2017

No. 12
- Position: Quarterback

Personal information
- Born: November 3, 1991 (age 35); North Providence, Rhode Island, U.S.
- Listed height: 6 ft 1 in (1.85 m)
- Listed weight: 200 lb (91 kg)

Career information
- High school: Griswold (Griswold, Connecticut)
- College: Columbia
- NFL draft: 2013: undrafted

Career history
- Utah Blaze (2014)*; Las Vegas Outlaws (2015); Jacksonville Sharks (2016); Qingdao Clipper (2016–2018); Washington Valor (2017); Massachusetts Pirates (2018–2021)
- * Offseason or practice squad member only

Awards and highlights
- United Bowl champion (2021); NAL MVP (2018); 2× Second-team All-NAL (2018, 2019); First-team All-Ivy League (2010)

Career AFL statistics
- Comp. / Att.: 253 / 443
- Passing yards: 2,996
- TD–INT: 58–17
- QB rating: 94.60
- Rushing TD: 9
- Stats at ArenaFan.com

Sean Brackett (born November 3, 1991) is an American former professional football quarterback who played in the Arena Football League (AFL), National Arena League (NAL), and Indoor Football League (IFL). He played college football at Columbia University.

== Early life ==
A two-sport letterman at Griswold High School in Griswold, Connecticut, Brackett played football and basketball. As a senior in 2008, Brackett was named first-team All-Eastern Connecticut Conference as a quarterback. Brackett was a Class M All-Academic selection as a senior in 2009 on the basketball team.

== College career ==
In December 2008, Brackett was accepted to Columbia University to be a member of the varsity football team. He finished his college career with totals of 531 completions on 999 passing attempts (53.1%) for 6,273 yards, 46 touchdowns, and 32 interceptions while rushing 414 times for 1,233 yards and 11 touchdowns.

== Professional career ==
Brackett was rated the 77th best quarterback in the 2013 NFL draft by NFLDraftScout.com.

Pre-draft measurables
| Height | Weight | 40-yard dash | 10-yard split | 20-yard split | 20-yard shuttle | Three-cone drill | Vertical jump | Broad jump | Bench press |
|---|---|---|---|---|---|---|---|---|---|
| 6 ft 0 in (1.83 m) | 199 lb (90 kg) | 4.77 s | 1.71 s | 2.78 s | 4.41 s | 6.94 s | 29 1/2 in (0.75 m) | 9 ft 10 in (3.00 m) | 13 reps |
All values from Columbia Pro Day

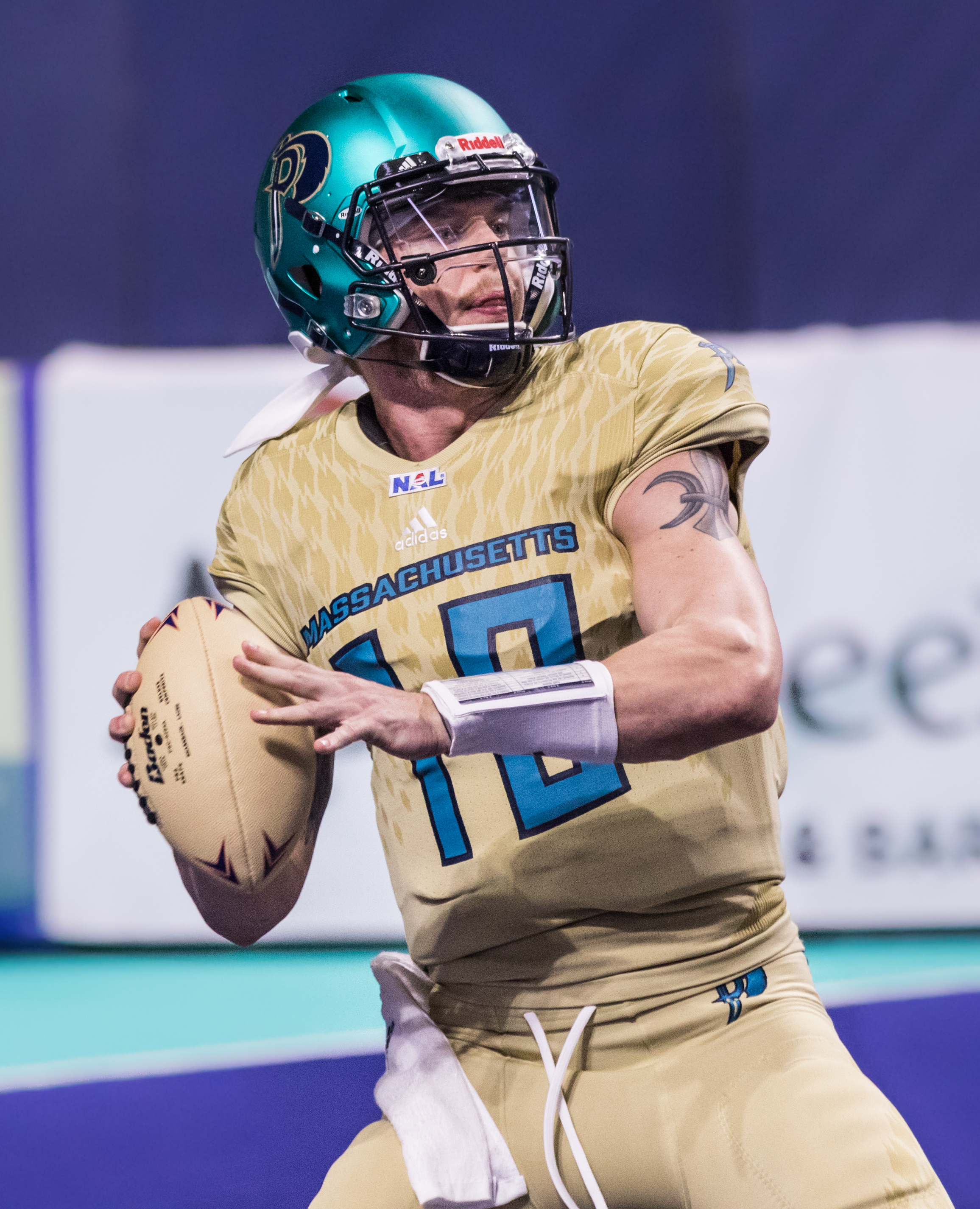
Brackett with the Massachusetts Pirates in 2019

In August 2013, Brackett was assigned to the Utah Blaze of the Arena Football League (AFL). However, in October 2013, the Blaze did not submit paperwork to return to the AFL, making Brackett a free agent again.

On October 28, 2014, Brackett was assigned to the AFL's Las Vegas Outlaws. He was named the backup to J. J. Raterink, for the 2015 season. After Raterink went down in Week 9, Brackett was named the starting quarterback for the Outlaws.

On October 16, 2015, Brackett was assigned to the Jacksonville Sharks of the AFL. He was the backup to Tommy Grady during the 2016 season.

Bracket was selected by the Qingdao Clipper in the 21st round of the 2016 CAFL draft and was the backup to Bryan Randall during the 2016 season. On October 29, 2016, Brackett relieved Randall and completed 5 of 5 passes for 102 yards and 2 touchdowns as the Clipper lost to the Shenzhen Naja by a score of 47–40. He was listed on the Clipper's roster for the 2018 season.

Brackett was assigned to the Washington Valor of the AFL on March 1, 2017. Brackett was activated on May 24, 2017, from injured reserve. On May 27, 2017, Brackett made his first start for the Valor and led the team to a 48–47 defeat.

Brackett signed with the Massachusetts Pirates of the National Arena League (NAL) on January 27, 2018. During the 2018 season, Brackett won the NAL Most Valuable Player Award and was named second-team All-NAL while passing for 3,170 yards with 74 touchdowns and 18 interceptions. In 2019, he passed for 2,523 yards with 57 touchdowns and 15 interceptions while being named second-team All-NAL again. The 2020 NAL season was cancelled due to the COVID-19 pandemic. Brackett re-signed with the Pirates for the 2021 season, which was the team's first after moving to the Indoor Football League.

== Career statistics ==
=== AFL ===
| Year | Team | Passing | | | | | | | Rushing | | |
| Year | Team | Cmp | Att | Pct | Yds | TD | Int | Rtg | Att | Yds | TD |
|---|---|---|---|---|---|---|---|---|---|---|---|
| 2015 | Las Vegas | 79 | 153 | 51.6 | 1,109 | 22 | 7 | 92.20 | 30 | 129 | 6 |
| 2016 | Jacksonville | 3 | 10 | 30.0 | 21 | 0 | 0 | 39.58 | 1 | 4 | 0 |
| 2017 | Washington | 171 | 280 | 61.1 | 1,866 | 36 | 10 | 98.01 | 15 | 97 | 3 |
| Career | | 253 | 443 | 57.1 | 2,996 | 58 | 17 | 94.60 | 46 | 230 | 9 |

=== NAL ===
| Year | Team | Passing | | | | | | | Rushing | | |
| Year | Team | Cmp | Att | Pct | Yds | TD | Int | Rtg | Att | Yds | TD |
|---|---|---|---|---|---|---|---|---|---|---|---|
| 2018 | Massachusetts | 259 | 419 | 61.8 | 3,170 | 74 | 18 | 105.7 | 25 | 113 | 4 |
| 2019 | Massachusetts | 244 | 396 | 61.6 | 2,523 | 57 | 15 | 105.5 | 40 | 153 | 12 |
| 2020 | Massachusetts | Did not play due to COVID-19 | | | | | | | | | |
| Career | | 503 | 815 | 61.8 | 5,693 | 131 | 33 | 105.7 | 65 | 266 | 16 |

=== IFL ===
| Year | Team | Passing | | | | | | | Rushing | | |
| Year | Team | Cmp | Att | Pct | Yds | TD | Int | Rtg | Att | Yds | TD |
|---|---|---|---|---|---|---|---|---|---|---|---|
| 2021 | Massachusetts | 18 | 34 | 52.9 | 142 | 2 | 3 | 46.45 | 4 | 12 | 0 |

=== College ===
| Year | Team | Passing | | | | | | | | Rushing | | | |
| Year | Team | Cmp | Att | Pct | Yds | Y/A | TD | Int | Rtg | Att | Yds | Avg | TD |
|---|---|---|---|---|---|---|---|---|---|---|---|---|---|
| 2009 | Columbia | 34 | 63 | 54.0 | 458 | 7.3 | 4 | 3 | 126.5 | 53 | 287 | 5.4 | 1 |
| 2010 | Columbia | 166 | 287 | 57.8 | 2,072 | 7.2 | 19 | 6 | 136.1 | 142 | 516 | 3.6 | 3 |
| 2011 | Columbia | 156 | 315 | 49.5 | 1,831 | 5.8 | 15 | 11 | 107.1 | 133 | 379 | 2.8 | 6 |
| 2012 | Columbia | 175 | 334 | 52.4 | 1,876 | 5.6 | 8 | 12 | 100.3 | 86 | 51 | 0.6 | 1 |
| Career | | 531 | 999 | 53.1 | 6,273 | 6.3 | 46 | 32 | 117.5 | 414 | 1,233 | 3.0 | 11 |

== Coaching career ==
Sean accepted the position of head coach for the Waltham High School Hawks varsity football team in May 2021. In 2022, Brackett accepted an offer to become the quarterbacks coach of the Massachusetts Pirates.
