= Tristan Purifoy =

American football player (born 1990)

Columbus Lions
- Position: Wide receiver
- Roster status: Active

Personal information
- Born: May 24, 1990 (age 36); Colony, Alabama
- Listed height: 6 ft 0 in (1.83 m)
- Listed weight: 205 lb (93 kg)

Career information
- High school: Hoover (AL)
- College: North Alabama
- NFL draft: 2012: undrafted

Career history
- Florida Tarpons (2014–2016); Jacksonville Sharks (2014); Tampa Bay Storm (2015–2016); Shenzhen Naja/Wuhan Gators (2016–present); Columbus Lions (2017–present)

Awards and highlights
- X-League champion (2015); Second Team All-NAL (2017)

Career AFL statistics
- Receptions: 22
- Receiving yards: 251
- Receiving TDs: 2
- Tackles: 16.5
- Stats at ArenaFan.com

Tristan Purifoy (born May 24, 1990) is an American football wide receiver for the Columbus Lions of the National Arena League (NAL). He played college football at the University of North Alabama.

== College career ==
Out of high school, Purifoy signed to play college football at Jones County Junior College. Following two years at Jones County, Purifoy signed to play with the University of North Alabama. Purifoy primarily played special teams as a junior, but as a senior, Purifoy increased his role as a wide receiver. Purifoy lead the Lions with 1,181 all-purpose yards in 2011. His 867 receiving yards in 2011, were the 5th best receiving year in school history.

== Professional career ==
=== Florida Tarpons ===
Purifoy signed with the Florida Tarpons of the Ultimate Indoor Football League (UIFL) in 2014. Purifoy returned to the Tarpons in 2015, while they moved to the X-League. Purifoy helped the Tarpons win the X-League championship. Purifoy re-joined the Tarpons midway through the 2016 season, but was exempted on May 11, 2016.

=== Jacksonville Sharks ===
Midway through the season, Purifoy was assigned with the Jacksonville Sharks of the Arena Football League on January 21, 2014. Purifoy started the season on injured reserve for the Sharks. On April 3, 2014, Purifoy was activated by the Sharks.

=== Tampa Bay Storm ===
On July 17, 2015, Purifoy was assigned to the Tampa Bay Storm. Purifoy finished the 2015 season with the Storm. Purifoy was reassigned just before the start of the 2016 season. He was assigned to the Storm once again on May 11, 2016. On May 21, 2016, Purifoy was placed on reassignment.

=== Shenzhen Naja/Wuhan Gators ===
Purifoy was selected by the Shenzhen Naja of the China Arena Football League (CAFL) in the twelfth round of the 2016 CAFL draft. After the 2016 season, the Naja relocated to become the Wuhan Gators. He is listed on the Gators' roster for the 2018 season.
