= Duane Brooks =

American football player (born 1987)

No. 2
- Position: Wide receiver

Personal information
- Born: June 24, 1987 (age 39); Irving, Texas, U.S.
- Listed height: 5 ft 10 in (1.78 m)
- Listed weight: 185 lb (84 kg)

Career information
- High school: Irving (TX) MacArthur
- College: Stephen F. Austin
- NFL draft: 2010: undrafted

Career history
- Colorado Ice (2011–2012); Spokane Shock (2013); Portland Thunder (2014–2015); Guangzhou Power (2016)

Awards and highlights
- First-team All-Arena (2015); J. Lewis Small Playmaker of the Year (2015)

Career AFL statistics
- Receptions: 155
- Receiving yards: 1,535
- Receiving TDs: 21
- Return yards: 3,180
- Return TDs: 8
- Stats at ArenaFan.com

Duane Brooks (born June 24, 1987) is an American former football wide receiver. He played College Football at Stephen F. Austin University after transferring from Central Michigan University. He also been a member of the Colorado Ice, Spokane Shock, Portland Thunder, and Guangzhou Power.

== Professional career ==
=== Portland Thunder ===
Brooks became one of the best return men in the AFL during the 2015 season. During the 2015 season, Brooks set an AFL record with his eighth kick return of the season for a touchdown. Brooks' record-breaking return season lead to his selection as a First Team All-Arena member as the kick-returner. Brooks was also awarded the J. Lewis Small Playmaker of the Year award.

=== Guangzhou Power ===
Brooks was selected by the Guangzhou Power of the China Arena Football League (CAFL) in the ninth round of the 2016 CAFL draft. He caught 32 passes for 325 yards and 4 touchdowns during the 2016 season. He is listed on the Power's roster for the 2018 season.

=== AFL statistics ===
Year	Team	Receiving			Returns		
Year	Team	Rec	Yds	TD	Ret	Yds	TD
2013	Spokane	35	316	6	0	0	0
2014	Portland	60	660	8	63	1,186	0
2015	Portland	60	559	7	91	1,994	8
Career		155	1,535	21	154	3,180	8
