= Jake Metz =

American football player (born 1991)

No. 8, 74, 96, 64
- Position: Defensive end

Personal information
- Born: March 16, 1991 (age 35); Souderton, Pennsylvania, U.S.
- Listed height: 6 ft 7 in (2.01 m)
- Listed weight: 265 lb (120 kg)

Career information
- High school: Souderton (PA) Area
- College: Shippensburg
- NFL draft: 2014: undrafted

Career history
- Philadelphia Soul (2015–2016); Philadelphia Eagles (2016)*; Qingdao Clipper (2016); Buffalo Bills (2017)*; Philadelphia Eagles (2017)*; Philadelphia Soul (2018–2019)
- * Offseason or practice squad member only

Awards and highlights
- ArenaBowl champion (2016); 2× First-team All-Arena (2016, 2018); AFL Defensive Lineman of the Year (2016); CAFL All-Pro North Division All-Star (2016)

Career AFL statistics
- Tackles: 60.5
- Sacks: 12.5
- Pass breakups: 6
- Stats at ArenaFan.com

Jake Atlee James Metz (born March 16, 1991) is an American former professional football defensive end. He played college football at Shippensburg. He played for the Philadelphia Soul, winning ArenaBowl XXIX in 2016.

== Early life ==
Metz attended Souderton Area High School, in Souderton, Pennsylvania, where he was a member of the football and basketball teams. He was number 10.

== College career ==
Metz attended Shippensburg University, where he was a member of the football team. He wore number 99. He finished his college career with totals of 135 solo tackles and 84 assisted tackles.

== Professional career ==
Metz was rated the 39th best defensive end in the 2014 NFL draft by NFLDraftScout.com.

Pre-draft measurables
Height	Weight	40-yard dash	10-yard split	20-yard split	20-yard shuttle	Three-cone drill	Vertical jump	Broad jump	Bench press
6 ft 6 in (1.98 m)	263 lb (119 kg)	4.99 s	1.70 s	2.84 s	4.91 s	7.31 s	28 in (0.71 m)	9 ft 5 in (2.87 m)	22 reps
All values from Villanova Pro Day

In 2014, Metz had workouts with the Philadelphia Eagles, New York Giants, and Detroit Lions after going undrafted.

Metz was assigned to the Philadelphia Soul of the AFL on October 7, 2014. He played in his first game on May 30, 2015, against the Las Vegas Outlaws, recording a tackle. On August 17, 2016, Metz was named the AFL's Defensive Lineman of the Year. The Soul won ArenaBowl XXIX against the Arizona Rattlers on August 26, 2016.

Metz signed with the NFL's Philadelphia Eagles on August 30, 2016. On September 3, 2016, he was released by the Eagles.

Metz was selected by the Qingdao Clipper of the China Arena Football League (CAFL) in the third round of the 2016 CAFL draft. He earned All-Pro North Division All-Star honors in 2016.

On April 7, 2017, Metz signed with the Buffalo Bills. On August 29, 2017, he was released by the Bills.

On August 30, 2017, Metz was claimed off waivers by the Eagles, only to be waived two days later.

Metz was listed on the Clipper's roster for the 2018 season. He played for the Soul again in 2018. On March 12, 2019, Metz was assigned to the Soul for the 2019 season.

== Career statistics ==
=== AFL ===
Year	Team										
Year	Team	Tkl	Ast	Sck	PB	FF	FR	Blk	Int	Yds	TD
2015	Philadelphia	7	2	0.5	0	0	0	0	0	0	0
2016	Philadelphia	22	14	7.0	3	2	0	0	0	0	0
2018	Philadelphia	13	12	3.5	2	3	0	1	0	0	0
2019	Philadelphia	3	3	1.5	1	0	0	1	0	0	0
Career		45	31	12.5	6	5	0	2	0	0	0

=== College ===
Shippensburg Red Raiders
Year	GP	UA	A	Total	TD	FF	TFL
2010	11	23	14	37	0	0	7.5
2011	11	30	14	44	0	1	10.5
2012	13	46	30	76	1	5	19
2013	11	36	26	62	0	0	18
Career	46	135	84	219	1	6	55
