= Luke Collis =

American football player (born 1988)

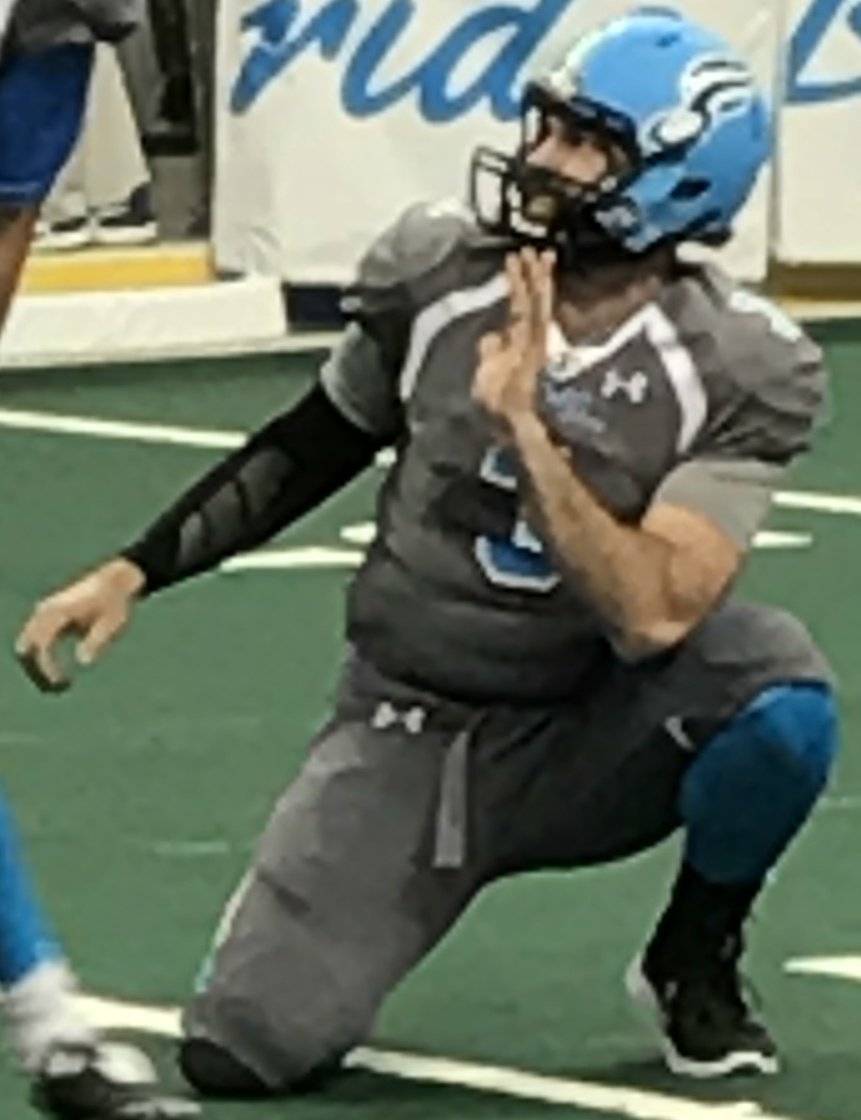
- Collis with the Philadelphia Soul in 2017

No. 3, 10, 13
- Position: Quarterback

Personal information
- Born: July 27, 1988 (age 38); Pasadena, California, U.S.
- Listed height: 6 ft 3 in (1.91 m)
- Listed weight: 230 lb (104 kg)

Career information
- High school: Saint Francis (La Cañada Flintridge, California)
- College: Nevada (2007–2009); Occidental (2010–2011)
- NFL draft: 2012: undrafted

Career history
- Spokane Shock (2012); Chicago Rush (2013)*; Knoxville NightHawks (2013); San Angelo Bandits (2014); Tampa Bay Storm (2015); Philadelphia Soul (2016–2017); Beijing Lions (2016); Georgia Doom (2018)
- * Offseason or practice squad member only

Awards and highlights
- 2× ArenaBowl champion (2016, 2017); China Bowl champion (2016); LSFL champion (2014); LSFL Player of the Year (2014); CAFL All-Pro North Division All-Star (2016); First-team All-SCIAC (2011); Second-team All-SCIAC (2010)

Career AFL statistics
- Comp. / Att.: 22 / 56
- Passing yards: 307
- TD–INT: 6–1
- QB rating: 77.01
- Stats at ArenaFan.com

Luke Collis (born July 27, 1988) is an American former professional football quarterback who played in the Arena Football League (AFL) with the Spokane Shock, Tampa Bay Storm, and Philadelphia Soul. He played college football for Nevada Wolf Pack and Occidental Tigers. He also played for the Knoxville NightHawks of the Professional Indoor Football League (PIFL), the San Angelo Bandits of the Lone Star Football League (LSFL), the Beijing Lions of the China Arena Football League (CAFL), and the Georgia Doom of the American Arena League (AAL).

== College career ==
After attending Saint Francis High School, Collis accepted a scholarship to play football at the University of Nevada in 2007. At Nevada, Collis was an Academic All-WAC honoree in 2009. After redshirting his freshman year, and playing behind Colin Kaepernick as a redshirt freshman and sophomore, Collis announced that he would transfer to Occidental College on January 7, 2010. He attempted one pass during his time at Nevada. Collis became a two-year starter and captain for the Occidental Tigers, and was named second-team All-Southern California Intercollegiate Athletic Conference (SCIAC) as a junior, and first-team All-SCIAC as a senior. As a senior, Collis ranked 3rd nationally in passing completions per game (27), 7th nationally in passing yards per game (305), and 5th nationally total passing touchdowns (28 in 9 games).

== Professional career ==
After going undrafted in the 2012 NFL draft, Collis was assigned to the Spokane Shock of the Arena Football League (AFL). Collis finished the season with no passes thrown, but achieved three solo tackles.

Collis was assigned to the AFL's Chicago Rush on March 5, 2013. He was placed on reassignment on March 12, 2013, before the start of the regular season.

During 2013, Collis signed with the Knoxville NightHawks of the Professional Indoor Football League (PIFL). Although Collis served as the backup for most of the season, he won the starting quarterback position by the end of the year.

Collis signed with the San Angelo Bandits of the Lone Star Football League (LSFL) for 2014. He became the starter for the Bandits during Week 3 of the regular season. Collis dominated, throwing 88 touchdowns and just 7 interceptions in 11 games, and was eventually named the league player of the year. Over one three game stretch, San Angelo scored 273 points, including one game where Collis threw 12 touchdown passes and the Bandits scored a league record 107 points. The Bandits went on to win the LSFL Championship.

Following the LSFL season, Collis signed with the Tampa Bay Storm of the AFL at the beginning of the AFL's free agency period, on September 26, 2014. Following training camp, Collis was named the backup to Jason Boltus.

Collis signed with the AFL's Philadelphia Soul on November 19, 2015. He was the backup to Dan Raudabaugh during the 2016 season as the Soul won ArenaBowl XXIX. In 2017, he was the backup to Raudabaugh as the Soul won ArenaBowl XXX.

Collis was selected by the Beijing Lions in the 20th round of the 2016 CAFL draft, joining his Soul head coach Clint Dolezel in Beijing. Collis was the starting quarterback for the Lions during the 2016 season and helped Beijing finish the season undefeated and win the first China Bowl. Collis completed 65.9% of his passes for 1,381 yards, 29 touchdowns and three interceptions, earning All-Pro North Division All-Star honors. He was listed on the Lions' roster for the 2018 season.

Collis was the starting quarterback for the Georgia Doom of the American Arena League (AAL) in 2018.

=== AFL statistics ===
Legend
| | Won the ArenaBowl |
| **Bold** | Career high |

| Year | Team | Passing | | | | | | | Rushing | | | Tackles | |
| Year | Team | Cmp | Att | Pct | Yds | TD | Int | Rtg | Att | Yds | TD | Solo | Ast |
|---|---|---|---|---|---|---|---|---|---|---|---|---|---|
| 2012 | Spokane | 0 | 0 | 0.0 | 0 | 0 | 0 | 0.0 | 0 | 0 | 0 | **3** | **1** |
| 2015 | Tampa Bay | 2 | 12 | 16.7 | 23 | 1 | **1** | 25.69 | **3** | **3** | 0 | 0 | 0 |
| 2016 | Philadelphia | 9 | 21 | 42.9 | 109 | 2 | 0 | 83.23 | 0 | 0 | 0 | 0 | **1** |
| 2017 | Philadelphia | **11** | **23** | **47.8** | **175** | **3** | 0 | **106.25** | 0 | 0 | 0 | 0 | 0 |
| Career | | 22 | 56 | 39.3 | 307 | 6 | 1 | 77.01 | 3 | 3 | 0 | 3 | 2 |
