= Lavasier Tuinei =

American gridiron football player (born 1990)

No. 80, 7
- Position: Wide receiver

Personal information
- Born: September 29, 1990 (age 36); Arcadia, Indiana, U.S.
- Listed height: 6 ft 5 in (1.96 m)
- Listed weight: 220 lb (100 kg)

Career information
- High school: Arcadia (IN) Hamilton Heights
- College: Golden West College (2008); Oregon (2009-2011)

Career history
- 2012: Seattle Seahawks*
- 2013: Cincinnati Bengals *
- 2013: Dallas Cowboys*
- 2013: New England Patriots*
- 2014: BC Lions
- 2015: Winnipeg Blue Bombers
- 2016: Guangzhou Power
- 2017: Baltimore Brigade
- * Offseason or practice squad member only
- Stats at CFL.ca

Lavasier T. Tuinei (born September 29, 1990) is an American former professional football wide receiver. He played college football at Oregon.

== College career ==
Tuinei played college football as a wide receiver at the University of Oregon from 2009 to 2011. During his career he had 108 receptions for 1,212 yards and 12 touchdowns. He was the Offensive Player of the Game in the 2012 Rose Bowl after recording eight receptions for 158 yards and two touchdowns.

Tuinei played only 9 games in his first season, adding 24 receptions for 217 yards and no touchdowns.

In Tuinei's second season, he played 10 games, finishing the season with 36 receptions for 396 yards and 2 touchdowns.

In his final season, Tuinei played all 14 games. He went on to catch 48 passes for 599 yards and 10 touchdowns. Tuinei played a critical role in the Oregon Ducks win over the Wisconsin Badgers in the 2012 Rose Bowl.

== Professional career ==
After going undrafted in the 2012 NFL draft, Tuinei spent time with the Seattle Seahawks, Cincinnati Bengals, Dallas Cowboys and New England Patriots without playing in any games. Tuinei signed with the BC Lions of the Canadian Football League in July 2014.

Tuinei was selected by the Guangzhou Power of the China Arena Football League (CAFL) in the tenth round of the 2016 CAFL draft. He caught 21 passes for 337 yards and 11 touchdowns during the 2016 season.

== Personal ==
His father, Van Tuinei, played in the NFL from 1997 to 2000.
