= Alex Carder =

American gridiron football player (born 1989)

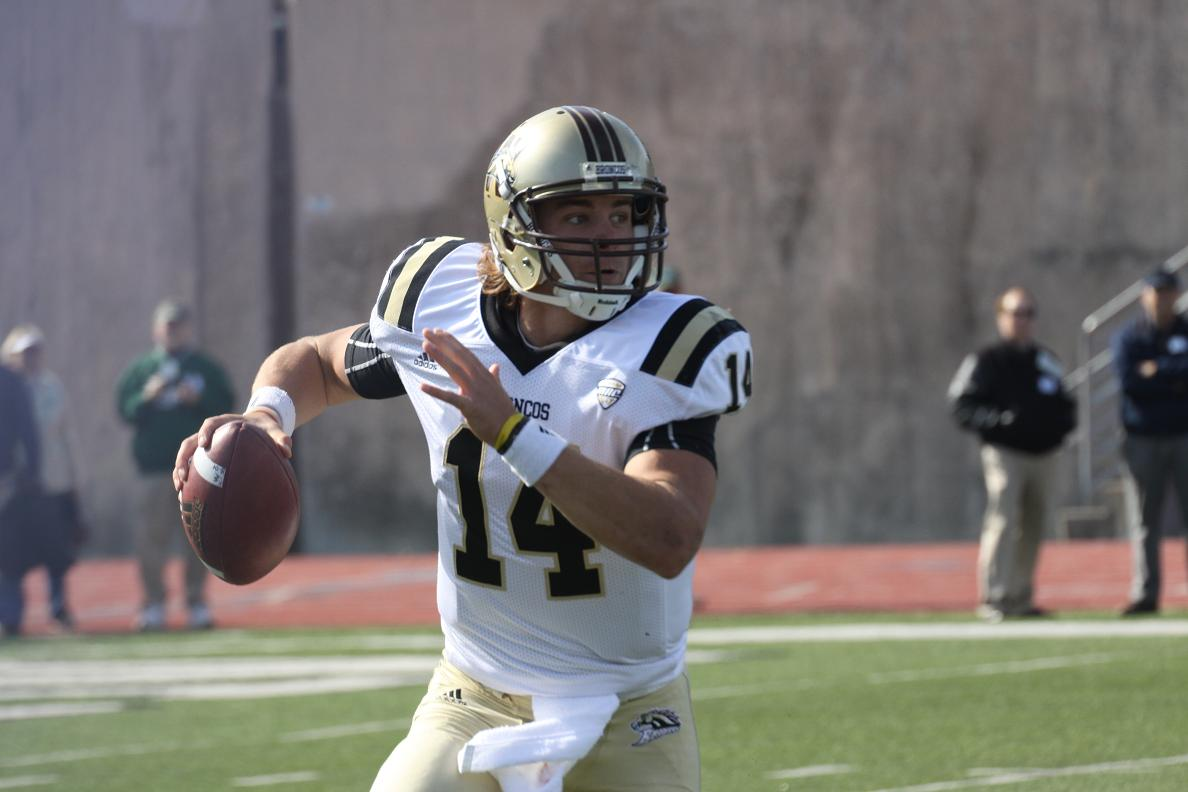
- Alex Carder with the Western Michigan Broncos in 2011

No. 14 – West Michigan Ironmen
- Position: Quarterback
- Roster status: Active

Personal information
- Born: October 22, 1989 (age 37); Springfield, Missouri, U.S.
- Listed height: 6 ft 2 in (1.88 m)
- Listed weight: 215 lb (98 kg)

Career information
- High school: Shawnee Mission Northwest (Shawnee, Kansas)
- College: Western Michigan
- NFL draft: 2013: undrafted

Career history
- Detroit Lions (2013)*; Iowa Barnstormers (2014)*; Nashville Venom (2014); Jacksonville Sharks (2014–2015); Ottawa Redblacks (2014); Portland Thunder (2015); Guangzhou Power (2016); West Michigan Ironmen (2016–present)
- * Offseason or practice squad member only

Awards and highlights
- First-team CIF Northern Conference (2017); Second-team All-MAC (2011)

Career AFL statistics
- Comp. / Att.: 23 / 42
- Passing yards: 324
- TD–INT: 6–4
- QB rating: 75.99
- Rushing yards: 56
- Stats at ArenaFan.com
- Stats at CFL.ca (archive)

Alex Carder (born October 22, 1989) is an American professional football quarterback for the West Michigan Ironmen of the American Arena League (AAL). He was signed as a free agent by the Detroit Lions of the National Football League (NFL). He was formerly the starting quarterback at Western Michigan University.

== Early life ==
Carder was born in Springfield, Missouri in 1989. He attended Shawnee Mission Northwest High School in Shawnee, Kansas where he was selected as an All-Sunflower League player three consecutive seasons. He passed for 3,457 yards and rushed for another 524 yards as the quarterback for SMNW's football team. He also received two varsity letters in baseball and one in basketball.

== College career ==
Carder was the backup quarterback as a redshirt freshman in 2009 and the starting quarterback in the 2010 through 2012 seasons. As a sophomore in 2010, Carder completed 289 of 458 passes for 3,334 yards, 30 touchdowns and 12 interceptions.

As a junior in 2011, he gained 3,940 yards of total offense on 3,434 passing yards and 253 rushing yards. He ranked eighth among all players in the NCAA Football Bowl Subdivision with 335.18 yards of total offense per game. In November 2011, Carder was responsible for eight touchdowns (seven passing and one rushing) in a 66–63 loss to the Toledo Rockets. His seven passing touchdowns against Toledo set a new Mid-American Conference (MAC) record, and his 548 passing yards in the game set a new Western Michigan record. He was selected as a finalist for the 2011 FRS QB Performance of the Year.

Carder's senior season was derailed when he sustained an injury in his throwing hand against Connecticut, though he was able to come back to play the final two games of the season.

=== Statistics ===
Year	Team	Passing								Rushing			
Year	Team	Cmp	Att	Pct	Yds	Y/A	TD	Int	Rtg	Att	Yds	Avg	TD
2009	Western Michigan	5	7	71.4	27	3.9	0	0	103.8	8	16	2.0	0
2010	Western Michigan	289	458	63.1	3,334	7.3	30	12	140.6	109	226	2.1	6
2011	Western Michigan	330	502	65.7	3,873	7.7	31	14	145.3	128	270	2.1	4
2012	Western Michigan	145	248	58.5	1,652	6.7	13	10	123.7	40	88	2.2	0
Career		769	1,215	63.3	8,886	7.3	74	36	138.9	285	600	2.1	10

== Professional career ==
Carder was rated the 20th best quarterback in the 2013 NFL draft by NFLDraftScout.com. His NFL.com Draft profile states that "If teams are willing to look past his senior season, and if Carder performs well enough in the postseason process, he could be a late-round pick."

Pre-draft measurables
Height	Weight	40-yard dash	10-yard split	20-yard split	20-yard shuttle	Three-cone drill	Vertical jump	Broad jump
6 ft 2 in (1.88 m)	221 lb (100 kg)	4.92 s	1.77 s	2.81 s	4.32 s	7.17 s	33 in (0.84 m)	9 ft 5 in (2.87 m)
All values from Pro Day

=== Detroit Lions ===
After going undrafted in the 2013 NFL draft, Carder was signed on April 27 as an unrestricted free agent by the Detroit Lions. He was released May 29.

=== Iowa Barnstormers ===
On February 5, 2014, Carder was assigned to the Iowa Barnstormers of the Arena Football League. Carder was placed on league suspension on March 12, 2014.

=== Nashville Venom ===
Carder was allowed to sign with the Nashville Venom of the Professional Indoor Football League (PIFL) on March 12, 2014, when the Barnstormers placed him on league suspension. After leading the Venom to a 3–0 start, Carder was placed on the AFL-Exempt list by the Venom.

=== Jacksonville Sharks ===
On April 24, 2014, Carder was assigned to the Jacksonville Sharks. After playing in parts of 3 games, and completing 2 of 3 passes for 19 yards, Carder was placed on other league exempt on June 9, 2014.

=== Ottawa Redblacks ===
Once placed on the other league exempt list by the Sharks, Carder signed with the Ottawa Redblacks of the Canadian Football League (CFL). He dressed for two games during his first season in the CFL but did not see any playing time. Carder was released on May 1, 2015.

=== Portland Thunder ===
On May 25, 2015, Carder was traded to the Portland Thunder for claim order positioning.

=== Guangzhou Power ===
Carder was selected by the Guangzhou Power in the nineteenth round of the 2016 CAFL draft and was the backup to J. J. Raterink during the 2016 season. Carder also served as the team's placekicker.

=== West Michigan Ironmen ===
In 2016, Carder signed with the West Michigan Ironmen. On February 23, 2017, he re-signed with the Ironmen. He played in 12 games for the Ironmen in 2017, completing 169 of 282 passes for 1,845 yards, 30 touchdowns and 12 interceptions. He earned First-team All-Northern Conference honors. As of 2024, Carder has been the starting quarterback for the Ironmen for every season since 2016 except the COVID-19 shortened 2020 season.

=== AFL statistics ===
Year	Team	Passing							Rushing		
Year	Team	Cmp	Att	Pct	Yds	TD	Int	Rtg	Att	Yds	TD
2014	Jacksonville	2	3	66.7	19	0	0	84.03	1	1	0
2015	Portland	21	39	53.8	305	6	4	78.42	4	33	0
Career		23	42	54.8	324	6	4	75.99	5	34	0
