= Shaun Kauleinamoku =

American football player (born 1987)

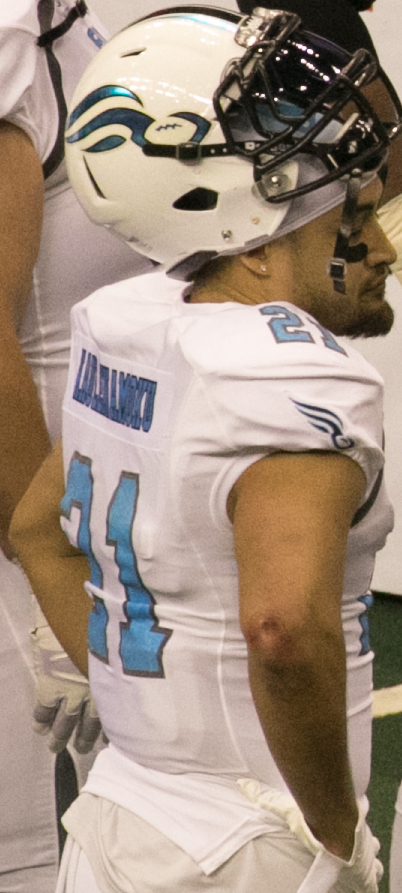
- Kauleinamoku with the Philadelphia Soul in 2017

No. 21
- Position: Wide receiver

Personal information
- Born: May 24, 1987 (age 39); Hawaii, U.S.
- Listed height: 5 ft 10 in (1.78 m)
- Listed weight: 185 lb (84 kg)

Career information
- High school: Saint Louis (Honolulu, Hawaii)
- College: Western Oregon
- NFL draft: 2010: undrafted

Career history

Playing
- Spokane Shock (2010–2011); San Antonio Talons (2012); Utah Blaze (2012); Pittsburgh Power (2014); Philadelphia Soul (2015–2018); Shanghai Skywalkers (2016, 2018)

Coaching
- Western Oregon (2013) Assistant

Awards and highlights
- 3× ArenaBowl champion (2010, 2016, 2017); ArenaBowl MVP (2016); Second-team All-Arena (2017); CAFL All-Pro South Division All-Star (2016); All-GNAC (2008)

Career AFL statistics
- Receptions: 552
- Receiving yards: 6,921
- Receiving TDs: 134
- Return yards: 683
- Stats at ArenaFan.com

Shaun Kauleinamoku (born May 24, 1987) is an American former professional football wide receiver who played in the Arena Football League (AFL). He played collegiately at Western Oregon University. Kauleinamoku was a member of the Spokane Shock, San Antonio Talons, Utah Blaze, Pittsburgh Power, Philadelphia Soul, and Shanghai Skywalkers.

== Professional career ==
On January 26, 2015, Kauleinamoku was assigned to the Philadelphia Soul. On January 26, 2016, Kauleinamoku was assigned to the Soul for the 2016 season. On August 26, 2016, the Soul beat the Arizona Rattlers in ArenaBowl XXIX by a score of 56–42 and Kauleinamoku was named ArenaBowl MVP. He earned second-team All-Arena honors in 2017. On August 26, 2017, the Soul beat the Tampa Bay Storm in ArenaBowl XXX by a score of 44–40.

Kauleinamoku was drafted by the Shanghai Skywalkers in the fourth round of the 2016 CAFL draft. He earned All-Pro South Division All-Star honors after catching 37 passes for 479 yards and 16 touchdowns. He also rushed for 71 yards and 4 touchdowns. He is listed on the Skywalkers' roster for the 2018 season.

=== AFL statistics ===
Legend
	ArenaBowl MVP
	Won the ArenaBowl
**Bold**	Career high

Year	Team			
Year	Team	Rec	Yds	TD
2010	Spokane	30	441	10
2011	Spokane	52	596	15
2012	San Antonio	1	5	0
2012	Utah	73	875	16
2014	Pittsburgh	**124**	**1,359**	19
2015	Philadelphia	70	1,038	21
2016	Philadelphia	99	1,304	**26**
2017	Philadelphia	70	902	23
2018	Philadelphia	33	401	4
Career		552	6,921	134

== Coaching career ==
Kauleinamoku was an assistant coach for the Western Oregon Wolves in 2013.
