= Shane Austin =

American football player (born 1989)

No. 10, 14, 4
- Position: Quarterback

Personal information
- Born: June 14, 1989 (age 37); Santa Monica, California, U.S.
- Listed height: 6 ft 1 in (1.85 m)
- Listed weight: 200 lb (91 kg)

Career information
- High school: Rio Mesa (Oxnard, California)
- College: Hawai'i (2007–2011)
- NFL draft: 2012: undrafted

Career history
- Everett Raptors (2012); Pittsburgh Power (2013); Cleveland Gladiators (2014–2015); Portland Steel (2016); Shanghai Skywalkers (2016); Washington Valor (2018); Philadelphia Soul (2018)

Awards and highlights
- Second-team All-Arena (2014); CAFL Offensive MVP (2016); CAFL All-Pro South Division All-Star (2016)

Career AFL statistics
- Comp. / Att.: 1,232 / 2,010
- Passing yards: 14,039
- TD–INT: 291–66
- QB rating: 104.78
- Rushing TD: 37
- Stats at ArenaFan.com

Shane Austin (born June 14, 1989) is an American former professional football quarterback. He played college football at University of Hawaiʻi. Austin went undrafted in the 2012 NFL draft and signed with the Everett Raptors of the Indoor Football League (IFL) after the draft. After starting the Raptors final games of the season, Austin was able to gain the attention of the Pittsburgh Power of the Arena Football League (AFL). Austin was named the starting quarterback for the Power, but a broken hand caused him to miss two months of the 2013 season. Austin then was assigned to the Cleveland Gladiators where he was named the backup to Chris Dieker. With Dieker struggling for the Gladiators, Austin was given the opportunity to start and lead the Gladiators to a 14–1 record as a starter and a berth in ArenaBowl XXVII. The Gladiators lost to Arizona Rattlers in the ArenaBowl, but Austin was named second-team All-Arena.

== Early life ==
Born June 14, 1989, in Santa Monica, California to Cathy and Dave Austin. He attended Rio Mesa High School in Oxnard, California, where he participated in football. As a junior, Austin split time with Chris Gagua, completing 52-of-81 passes with five touchdowns and three interceptions. Austin was the lone starter for the Spartans in 2006 and broke many school records for passing.

== College career ==
Austin's late development as a quarterback lead to his light recruitment from Football Bowl Subdivision schools, but he was offered a chance to walk-on to the football team at the University of Hawaiʻi, and accepted the team's offer. Austin spent his true freshman season as a redshirt for the Warriors, and didn't see any playing time as a redshirt freshman. In 2008, Austin was given the opportunity to compete for the starting quarterback spot, and won a start versus San Jose State when starter Bryant Moniz was out with an injury. Austin threw for a career-high 299-yards against the Spartans, including a 10-yard pass to Kealoha Pilares on third down in overtime. The following week Austin was once again backing up Moniz. In 2010, Austin was listed as the backup to Moniz again. He was action in the season opener again USC as Moniz left the game with an injury. Austin completed 6-of-9 passes for 141 yards and two touchdowns. In 2011, Austin received another chance to start, this time against Fresno State. Austin struggled, and was pulled in the first half in favor of David Graves.

== Professional career ==
Prior to the 2012 NFL draft, Austin was projected to be undrafted by NFLDraftScout.com. He was rated as the 56th best quarterback in the draft.

Pre-draft measurables
Height	Weight	40-yard dash	10-yard split	20-yard split	20-yard shuttle	Three-cone drill	Vertical jump	Broad jump	Bench press
5 ft 11.5 in (1.82 m)	195 lb (88 kg)	4.85 s	1.70 s	2.79 s	4.57 s	7.21 s	30 in (0.76 m)	8 ft 8 in (2.64 m)	15 reps
All values from 2012 Hawaii Pro Day

He was signed by the Everett Raptors of the Indoor Football League as an undrafted free agent in 2012. Austin joined the 2–5 Raptors at the midway point of their season after starting quarterback Blake Bolles had signed with the Minnesota Vikings for training camp, and received just one practice with the Raptors before he was thrust in to the starting quarterback role. Austin caught on quickly to indoor football, leading the Raptors to 59 points in his first game (the Raptors had been averaging 44.0 points a game). Austin was able to help the Raptors keep their playoff hopes alive, leading them to a 2–2 record in his first 4 games. But the Raptors finished 1–2 in their final 3 games, missing out on the final Intense Conference playoff spot. Austin finished the season with 1,546 yards passing and 38 passing touchdowns, along with 285 rushing yards and two touchdowns rushing.

Austin was assigned to the Pittsburgh Power of the Arena Football League (AFL) for the 2013 season. Austin served as the team's backup quarterback for the first 16 weeks of the season, appearing in 3 games. During the team's Week 13 game against the Philadelphia Soul, Austin received his first extended playing time after starter Derek Cassidy was pulled for his play. The game ended in a 21–59 defeat, with Austin throwing for 3 touchdowns and was intercepted twice. Austin would not see the field again until he was named the starting quarterback Week 17 against the San Jose SaberCats. Austin and the Power struggled mightily, losing 78–20. By losing by 58 points, the Power set an AFL record margin of victory for a home loss. Despite struggling in his first start, Austin started the remaining 2 games of the season for the Power, winning 48–37 at the Tampa Bay Storm, and losing 61–43 to the Spokane Shock.

Austin began the season as the backup quarterback to Chris Dieker. With Dieker struggling in each of the team's second and third games, Austin came in relief and rallied the Gladiators to win both games. When it came to Week 4 of the regular season, Austin became the starting quarterback for the Gladiators. The 2014 Cleveland Gladiators finished the season with a record of seventeen wins and one loss. They lost 32–72 in ArenaBowl XXVII to the Arizona Rattlers on August 23, 2014.

On November 30, 2015, Austin was assigned to the Portland Thunder of the AFL. On February 24, 2016, the franchise changed its name from Thunder to Steel. He was placed on league suspension on March 17, 2016, so he could tryout for the Saskatchewan Roughriders of the Canadian Football League. He re-joined the team in mid-May 2016.

Austin was drafted by the Shanghai Skywalkers in the first round of the China Arena Football League draft in 2016. He earned CAFL Offensive MVP and All-Pro South Division All-Star honors in 2016 after completing 121 of 191 passes for 1,436 yards, 35 touchdowns and 5 interceptions. He also rushed for 74 yards and 4 touchdowns. He was listed on the Skywalkers' roster for the 2018 season.

On May 3, 2018, Austin was assigned to the AFL's Washington Valor. On May 29, 2018, he was placed on reassignment.

On June 5, 2018, Austin was assigned to the Philadelphia Soul of the AFL.

== Career statistics ==
Legend
	Led the league
**Bold**	Career high

=== AFL ===
Year	Team	Passing							Rushing		
Year	Team	Cmp	Att	Pct	Yds	TD	Int	Rtg	Att	Yds	TD
2013	Pittsburgh	106	192	55.2	1,215	18	9	78.36	12	40	3
2014	Cleveland	367	564	**65.1**	4,478	99	15	**117.89**	**62**	175	**12**
2015	Cleveland	**416**	**682**	61.0	**4,651**	**101**	18	107.36	56	**233**	**12**
2016	Portland	253	420	60.2	2,531	48	**19**	87.11	38	141	8
2018	Washington	55	91	60.4	813	19	3	115.52	5	31	2
2018	Philadelphia	35	61	57.4	351	6	2	84.80	9	31	0
Career		1,232	2,010	61.3	14,039	291	66	104.78	182	651	37

=== College ===
Year	Team	Passing							Rushing			
Year	Team	Cmp	Att	Pct	Yds	TD	Int	Rtg	Att	Yds	Avg	TD
2008	Hawaii	0	0	0	0.0	0	0	0.0	0	0	0.0	0
2009	Hawaii	58	93	545	62.4	2	3	112.2	6	−29	−4.8	1
2010	Hawaii	19	33	258	57.6	2	1	137.2	4	−3	−0.8	1
2011	Hawaii	47	88	500	53.4	2	3	101.8	6	−16	−2.7	0
Career		124	214	1,303	57.9	6	7	111.8	16	-48	-3.0	2
