= Luis Vasquez (American football) =

American football player (born 1986)

No. 36, 93
- Position: Defensive lineman

Personal information
- Born: April 23, 1986 (age 40); Gales Ferry, Connecticut, U.S.
- Listed height: 6 ft 3 in (1.91 m)
- Listed weight: 265 lb (120 kg)

Career information
- High school: Ledyard (CT)
- College: Purdue (2004); Arizona Western College (2005-2006); Arizona State (2007-2008)
- NFL draft: 2009: undrafted

Career history
- Baltimore Ravens (2009)*; Arkansas Diamonds (2010); Dallas Vigilantes (2011); Milwaukee Iron/Mustangs (2011–2012); San Jose SaberCats (2013–2015); Arizona Rattlers (2016); Guangzhou Power (2016)*
- * Offseason or practice squad member only

Awards and highlights
- ArenaBowl champion (2015); Second-team All-Arena (2012); First-team All-IFL (2010); WSFL Defensive Player of the Year (2005)

Career AFL statistics
- Tackles: 115
- Sacks: 24
- Tackles for loss: 22.5
- Forced fumbles: 5
- Fumbles recovered: 5
- Stats at ArenaFan.com

Luis Guillermo Vasquez (born April 23, 1986) is an American former football defensive lineman. He played college football at Arizona State University.

== College career ==
Vasquez signed to play with the Purdue Boilermakers football team in 2004, where he redshirted during the 2004 season. Vasquez transferred to Arizona Western College, where he was named the Western States Football League Defensive Player of the Year in 2005. Vasquez had originally committed to Washington State, but when Robb Akey left to take the head coaching job at Idaho, Vasquez decommitted and chose Arizona State.

== Professional career ==
After going undrafted in the 2009 NFL draft, Vasquez signed as an undrafted free agent with the Baltimore Ravens. In June 2009, Vasquez was released.

In 2010, Vasquez played for the Arkansas Diamonds of the Indoor Football League (IFL), where he was named a 2nd Team All-IFL performer after the season.

On December 15, 2010, Vasquez was assigned to the Dallas Vigilantes of the Arena Football League (AFL).

On April 21, 2011, Vasquez was traded to the Milwaukee Iron for future considerations. Upon the completion of the 2012 season, Vasquez was named second-team All-Arena

In 2012, Vasquez joined the San Jose SaberCats.

On February 17, 2016, Vasquez was assigned to the Arizona Rattlers.

Vasquez was selected by the Guangzhou Power of the China Arena Football League (CAFL) in the 21st round of the 2016 CAFL draft.
