= Colin Madison =

American football player (born 1989)

No. 70
- Position: Offensive lineman

Personal information
- Born: June 13, 1989 (age 37); Villa Park, Illinois, U.S.
- Listed height: 6 ft 3 in (1.91 m)
- Listed weight: 328 lb (149 kg)

Career information
- High school: Willowbrook (IL)
- College: Temple
- NFL draft: 2011: undrafted

Career history
- Baltimore Ravens (2011)*; Chicago Rush (2012–2013); Pittsburgh Power (2014); San Jose SaberCats (2015); Los Angeles KISS (2016); Shenzhen Naja (2016); Monterrey Steel (2017); Baltimore Brigade (2017–2019)
- * Offseason or practice squad member only

Awards and highlights
- ArenaBowl champion (2015); Second-team All-Arena (2014); Second-team All-NAL (2017); 2× First-team All-MAC (2009, 2010)

Career AFL statistics
- Receptions: 21
- Receiving yards: 215
- Receiving TDs: 5
- Tackles: 7
- Stats at ArenaFan.com
- Stats at Pro Football Reference

Colin Madison (born June 13, 1989) is an American former professional football offensive lineman. Madison initially played football at Willowbrook High School in Villa Park, IL; following his graduation, he attended Temple University. Madison started a total of twenty-eight games at Temple. He was signed by the Baltimore Ravens of the National Football League as an undrafted free agent in 2011. In 2012, Madison made his AFL debut with the Chicago Rush. He started in a total of seven games that season. In 2013, the Rush made him a primary starter on their offensive line; Madison started in eighteen games that season. In addition to his regular duties as an offensive lineman, Madison scored three touchdowns for the Rush as a tight end. The team folded at the end of the 2013 season; as such, Madison joined the AFL's Pittsburgh Power. Madison started in all of the Power's regular season games; he was named to the All-Arena Second Team. The Power, despite posting a 15-3 record in 2014, folded in November of that year. In light of this, Madison was assigned to the San Jose SaberCats on March 18, 2015. The SaberCats would go on to win ArenaBowl XXVIII at the end of the 2015 season; Madison started eighteen games on the season. On January 15, 2016, Madison was assigned to the Los Angeles KISS for the 2016 season. He was selected by the Shenzhen Naja of the China Arena Football League (CAFL) in the fourth round of the 2016 CAFL draft. On July 6, 2017, Madison was assigned to the Baltimore Brigade. On April 16, 2019, Madison was assigned to the Brigade again.

Pre-draft measurables
Height	Weight	40-yard dash	10-yard split	20-yard split	20-yard shuttle	Three-cone drill	Vertical jump	Broad jump	Bench press
6 ft 3 1/8 in (1.91 m)	328 lb (149 kg)	5.69 s	1.95 s	3.20 s	4.96 s	8.28 s	23.5 in (0.60 m)	7 ft 5 in (2.26 m)	31 reps
All values from Pro Day
