= Robert Gordon (gridiron football) =

American gridiron football player and coach (born 1968)

Profile
- Position: Wide receiver

Personal information
- Born: July 9, 1968 (age 58); Detroit, Michigan, U.S.

Career information
- College: Nebraska at Omaha

Career history

Playing
- 1991–1992: Ottawa Rough Riders
- 1993–1994: Toronto Argonauts
- 1995: BC Lions
- 1996: Ottawa Rough Riders
- 1997: Edmonton Eskimos
- 1998: Orlando Predators
- 1999–2004: Winnipeg Blue Bombers
- 2001–2002: Detroit Fury
- 2005: Los Angeles Avengers

Coaching
- 2014: Omaha Mammoths (Asst)
- 2017: Shenyang Black Rhinos (HC)
- 2019–2021: Montreal Alouettes (WR)

Awards and highlights
- ArenaBowl champion (1998); 2× CFL East All-Star (1999, 2000)

Robert Gordon (born July 9, 1968) is an American former professional football player who was a wide receiver for thirteen seasons in the Canadian Football League (CFL), six of those for the Winnipeg Blue Bombers. He was a CFL Eastern All Star in 1999 and 2000. In 1998, 2001–2002 and 2005, he played in the Arena Football League (AFL) for several teams.

The Blue Bombers allowed Gordon to play for the AFL's Detroit Fury during the CFL offseason. The AFL and CFL seasons did not conflict. However, this ended up backfiring because Gordon missed 2002 CFL training camp due to a broken arm suffered while playing for the Fury. He then broke his arm again because he tried to return from the injury too quickly.

== Coaching career ==
Gordan was an assistant coach for the Omaha Mammoths of the Fall Experimental Football League in 2014. On May 9, 2017, Gordon was introduced as the new head coach of the Shenyang Black Rhinos of the China Arena Football League.

Gordon was honoured in October 2018 at the annual Hall of Fame Legacy Dinner for the Winnipeg Football Club.

Gordan was named wide receivers coach for the Montreal Alouettes of the Canadian Football League in June 2019. He coached for the Alouettes for two seasons, but was not retained following the 2021 season.
