= Brennen Carvalho =

American football player (born 1985)

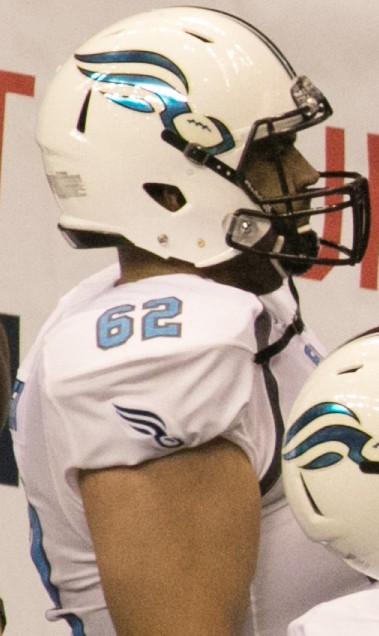
- Carvalho with the Philadelphia Soul in 2017

No. 55, 62
- Position: Center

Personal information
- Born: December 8, 1985 (age 40); Kapa'a, Hawaii, U.S.
- Listed height: 6 ft 1 in (1.85 m)
- Listed weight: 300 lb (136 kg)

Career information
- High school: Honolulu (HI) Kamehameha Schools
- College: Portland State
- NFL draft: 2008: undrafted

Career history
- Green Bay Packers (2008)*; Arizona Rattlers (2010–2011); Philadelphia Soul (2012–2014); Arizona Rattlers (2015); Guangzhou Power (2016); Philadelphia Soul (2017)
- * Offseason or practice squad member only

Awards and highlights
- ArenaBowl champion (2017); First-team All-Arena (2013); Second-team All-Arena (2011); Division I FCS Rimington Trophy (2007); 3× First-team All-Big Sky (2005–2007)

Career AFL statistics
- Receptions: 1
- Receiving yards: 21
- Rushing attempts: 1
- Rushing yards: 1
- Total touchdowns: 1
- Stats at ArenaFan.com

Brennen Michael-Kapono Carvalho (born December 31, 1985) is an American former professional football center. He was signed by the Green Bay Packers as an undrafted free agent in 2008. He played college football at Portland State.

== Professional career ==
=== Pre-draft ===
Prior to the 2008 NFL draft, Carvalho was projected to be a seventh round to undrafted by NFLDraftScout.com. He was rated as the 10th-best center in the draft. He was not invited to the NFL Scouting Combine, he posted the following numbers during his pro-day workouts at Portland State University:

Pre-draft measurables
Height	Weight	40-yard dash	10-yard split	20-yard split	20-yard shuttle	Three-cone drill	Vertical jump	Broad jump	Bench press
6 ft 1 in (1.85 m)	294 lb (133 kg)	5.00 s	1.70 s	2.84 s	4.20 s	7.34 s	31 in (0.79 m)	9 ft 4 in (2.84 m)	25 reps
All values from 2008 Portland State Pro Day

=== Green Bay Packers ===
After going undrafted, Carvalho spent the 2008 season on the practice squad of the Green Bay Packers.

=== Arizona Rattlers ===
In 2010 and 2011, Carvalho played for the Arizona Rattlers of the Arena Football League.

=== Philadelphia Soul ===
Carvalho was assigned to the Philadelphia Soul for the 2012 season, where he anchored a line that lost ArenaBowl XXV. Carvalho has re-signed with the Soul for 2013. He was named a First-team All-Arena Selection following the 2013 season. In January 2014, Carvalho agreed to return to the Soul on a one-year deal.

=== Return to the Arizona Rattlers ===
On February 11, 2015, Carvalho was assigned to the Arizona Rattlers

=== Guangzhou Power ===
Carvalho was selected by the Guangzhou Power of the China Arena Football League (CAFL) in the second round of the 2016 CAFL draft.

=== Philadelphia Soul ===
On May 1, 2017, Carvalho was assigned to the Philadelphia Soul. On August 26, 2017, the Soul beat the Tampa Bay Storm in ArenaBowl XXX by a score of 44–40.
