= China Bowl =

China Bowl may refer to:

- China Bowl (NFL), a proposed football game by the National Football League
- China Bowl (CAFL), the championship football game for the China Arena Football League
- China Bowl (1945), a game between US Army and Navy players held in Shanghai
