= Dexter Davis Jr. =

American football player (born 1990)

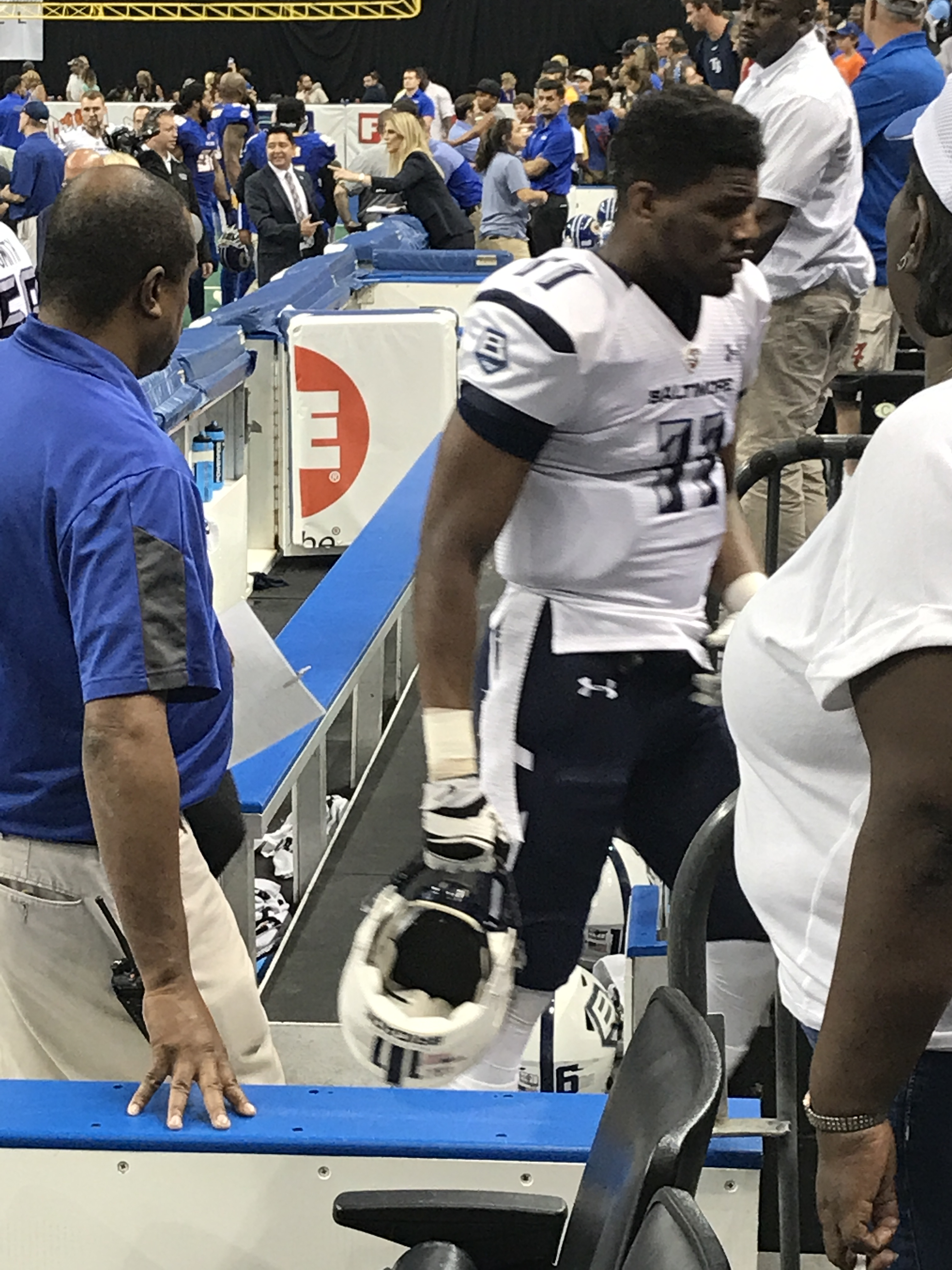
- Davis Jr. with the Baltimore Brigade in 2017

No. 11, 2
- Position: Linebacker

Personal information
- Born: December 27, 1990 (age 35); Rex, Georgia, U.S.
- Listed height: 6 ft 3 in (1.91 m)
- Listed weight: 230 lb (104 kg)

Career information
- High school: Morrow (Ellenwood, Georgia)
- College: Friends
- NFL draft: 2013: undrafted

Career history
- Columbus Lions (2015)*; Portland Thunder/Steel (2015–2016); Guangzhou Power (2016); Baltimore Brigade (2017); Wichita Force (2018)
- * Offseason or practice squad member only

Awards and highlights
- 2× First-team All-KCAC (2011, 2012); KCAC Defensive Player of the Year (2011); 2× AFCA All-American (2011, 2012)

Career AFL statistics
- Tackles: 67.5
- Sacks: 11
- Pass breakups: 10
- Stats at ArenaFan.com

Dexter B. Davis Jr. (born December 27, 1990) is an American former football linebacker. He played college football at Friends University and attended Morrow High School in Morrow, Georgia. He was a member of the Columbus Lions, Portland Steel, Guangzhou Power, Baltimore Brigade, and Wichita Force.

== Early life ==
Davis attended Morrow High School.

== College career ==
Davis played college football for the Friends Falcons from 2009 to 2012. He was the team's starter his final two years and helped the Falcons to 25 wins. He played in 39 games during his career including 39 starts at defensive end. Davis lead the entire National Association of Intercollegiate Athletics with 14.0 sacks as a junior. Davis was twice named first-team All-Kansas Collegiate Athletic Conference and was the 2011 KCAC Defensive Player of the Year. Davis was also named a two-time American Football Coaches Association All-American. He also participated in track and field at Friends. He was inducted into the Friends University Athletic Hall of Fame in 2022.

=== Statistics ===
Year	Team	Tackles						Interceptions				
Year	Team	Solo	Ast	Total	Loss	Sacks	FF	Int	Yards	Avg	TD	PD
2009	Friends	22	8	30	14.5	11.0	0	0	0	--	0	0
2010	Friends	10	4	14	8.5	3.5	1	0	0	--	0	1
2011	Friends	33	25	58	24.5	14.0	3	0	0	--	0	3
2012	Friends	31	14	45	21.0	14.0	8	1	0	0.0	0	4
NAIA career totals		96	51	147	68.5	42.5	12	1	0	0.0	0	8

== Professional career ==
Pre-draft measurables
Height	Weight	40-yard dash	10-yard split	20-yard split	20-yard shuttle	Three-cone drill	Vertical jump	Broad jump	Bench press
6 ft 2 in (1.88 m)	226 lb (103 kg)	4.66 s	2.82 s	1.78 s	4.64 s	7.00 s	31.0 in (0.79 m)	10 ft 03 in (3.12 m)	14 reps
All values from Kansas State Pro Day

=== Portland Steel ===
On November 14, 2014, Davis was assigned to the Portland Thunder. Portland exercised Davis' rookie option to retain him for the 2016 season.

=== Guangzhou Power ===
Davis was selected by the Guangzhou Power of the China Arena Football League (CAFL) in the fifth round of the 2016 CAFL draft. He was selected by the Guangzhou Power in the fourth round of the 2017 CAFL draft.

=== Baltimore Brigade ===
Davis was assigned to the Baltimore Brigade on March 27, 2017. Davis was named the AFL's Defensive Player of the Week for Week 3 following a three sack performance against the Cleveland Gladiators.
