= Kent Richardson =

American gridiron football player (born 1987)

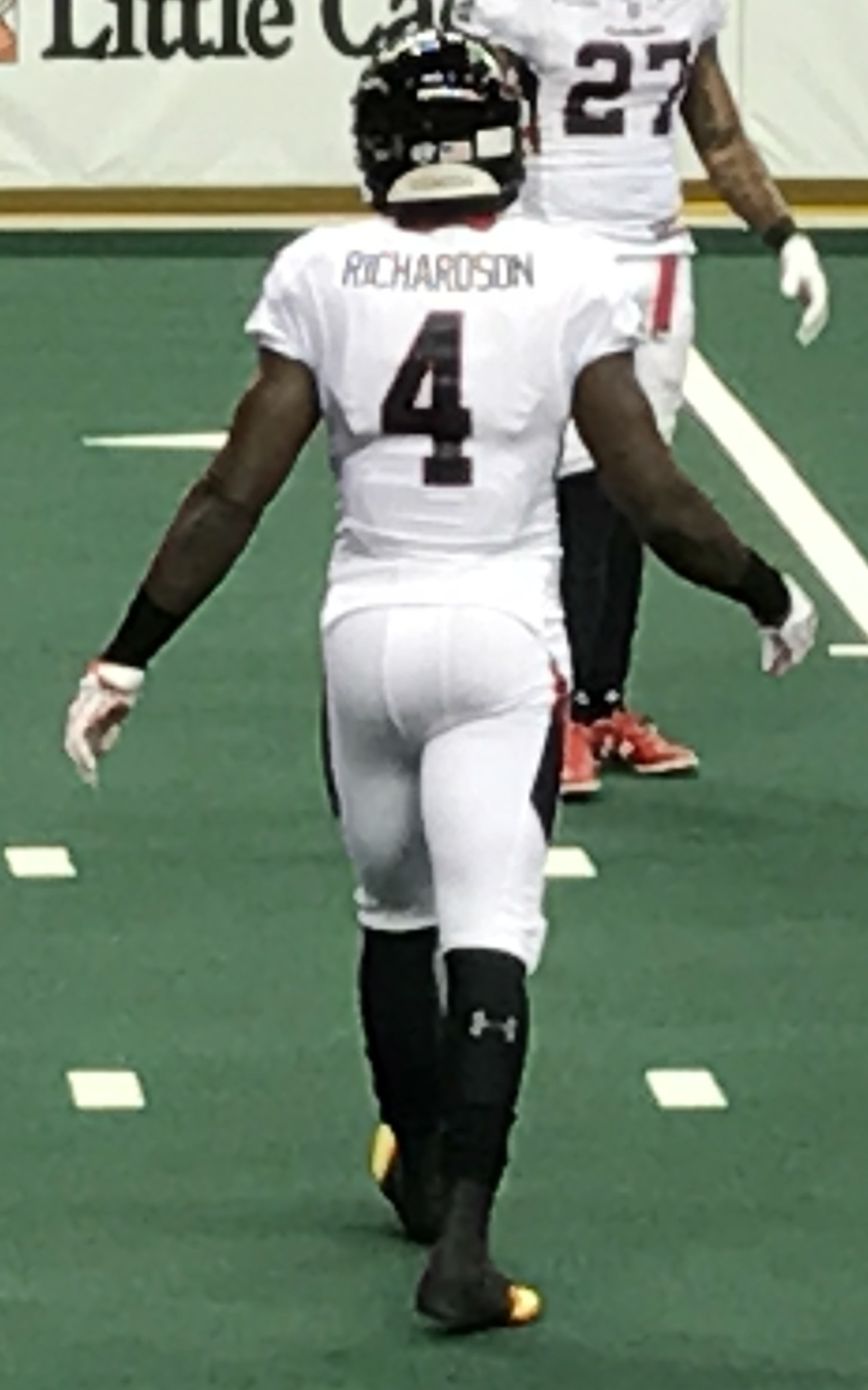
- Richardson (4) in 2017

No. 1, 9, 4
- Position: Cornerback

Personal information
- Born: April 21, 1987 (age 39); Tallahassee, Florida, U.S.
- Listed height: 5 ft 11 in (1.80 m)
- Listed weight: 200 lb (91 kg)

Career information
- High school: James S. Rickards (Tallahassee, Florida)
- College: West Virginia
- NFL draft: 2010: undrafted

Career history
- Philadelphia Soul (2011–2012); Cleveland Browns (2013)*; Jacksonville Sharks (2014)*; Philadelphia Soul (2014–2015); Toronto Argonauts (2014)*; Orlando Predators (2016); Dalian Dragon Kings (2016); Cleveland Gladiators (2017); Philadelphia Soul (2017); Baltimore Brigade (2018)*; Washington Valor (2018)
- * Offseason or practice squad member only

Awards and highlights
- ArenaBowl champion (2017); AFL Defensive Back of the Year (2012); First-team All-Arena (2012); CAFL All-Pro North Division All-Star (2016)

Career AFL statistics
- Tackles: 315
- Pass breakups: 59
- Forced fumbles: 8
- Fumble recoveries: 9
- Interceptions: 29
- Stats at ArenaFan.com

Kent Richardson (born April 21, 1987) is an American former football cornerback. He played college football at West Virginia.

== Professional career ==
=== Philadelphia Soul ===
In 2011, Richardson signed to play for the Philadelphia Soul of the Arena Football League. In 2012, he led the league in interceptions with 14, and was named the Defensive Back of the Year, as well as earning First-team All-Arena.

=== Cleveland Browns ===
After re-signing with the Soul for 2013, he was placed on other league exempt list due to his signing of a futures contract with the Cleveland Browns.

=== Jacksonville Sharks ===
After his release from the Browns, the Soul traded Richardson to the Jacksonville Sharks for Jeff Hughley.

=== Return to Soul ===
On February 27, 2014, Richardson was traded back to the Soul for Hughley once again.

=== Toronto Argonauts ===
On April 15, 2014, Richardson signed with the Toronto Argonauts of the Canadian Football League. He was released in June and re-joined the Soul.

=== Orlando Predators ===
On November 16, 2015, Richardson was assigned to the Orlando Predators.

=== Dalian Dragon Kings ===
Richardson was selected by the Dalian Dragon Kings of the China Arena Football League (CAFL) in the thirteenth round of the 2016 CAFL draft. He earned All-Pro North Division All-Star honors in 2016.

=== Cleveland Gladiators ===
On January 31, 2017, Richardson was assigned to the Cleveland Gladiators.

=== Third stint with the Soul ===
On June 15, 2017, Richardson was assigned to the Soul. On August 26, 2017, the Soul beat the Tampa Bay Storm in ArenaBowl XXX by a score of 44–40.

=== Baltimore Brigade ===
On April 3, 2018, Richardson was assigned to the Baltimore Brigade. On April 6, 2018, he was placed on recallable reassignment.

=== Washington Valor ===
On April 11, 2018, he was assigned to the Washington Valor. On April 16, 2018, he was placed on reassignment.
