= Jason Holman =

American gridiron football player (born 1983)

No. 99
- Position: Offensive lineman / defensive lineman

Personal information
- Born: April 28, 1983 (age 43); Midlothian, Virginia, U.S.
- Listed height: 6 ft 3 in (1.91 m)
- Listed weight: 295 lb (134 kg)

Career information
- High school: Midlothian (VA) James River
- College: Winston-Salem State
- NFL draft: 2008: undrafted

Career history
- Grand Rapids Rampage (2008); Colorado Crush (2008)*; Billings Outlaws (2009); Richmond Revolution (2010); Hamilton Tiger-Cats (2010)*; Jacksonville Sharks (2011–2012); Richmond Raiders (2013); Philadelphia Soul (2014); Jacksonville Sharks (2015–2016); Qingdao Clipper (2016)
- * Offseason or practice squad member only

Awards and highlights
- ArenaBowl champion (2011); Second-team All-IFL (2010)

Career AFL statistics
- Rushes: 6
- Rushing yards: 23
- Tackles: 51
- Sacks: 9.5
- Forced fumbles: 4
- Stats at ArenaFan.com

Jason Holman (born April 28, 1983) is an American former football offensive / defensive lineman. He played as a center for the University of Maryland before transferring to Winston-Salem State University where he played as a defensive lineman. He was signed as an undrafted free agent by the Grand Rapids Rampage in 2008.

Holman was selected by the Qingdao Clipper of the CAFL in the second round of the 2016 CAFL draft. He rushed for 77 yards and 1 touchdown during the 2016 season. He is listed on the Clipper's roster for the 2018 season.
