= Mike Washington (wide receiver) =

American football player (born 1986)

Profile
- Position: Wide receiver

Personal information
- Born: October 19, 1986 (age 40); Pittsburgh, Pennsylvania
- Listed height: 5 ft 8 in (1.73 m)
- Listed weight: 175 lb (79 kg)

Career information
- High school: Aliquippa (Aliquippa, Pennsylvania)
- College: Hawaii
- NFL draft: 2009: undrafted

Career history
- Pittsburgh Power (2011–2013); Spokane Shock (2014–2015); Arizona Rattlers (2016); Tampa Bay Storm (2016); Shanghai Skywalkers (2016); Washington Valor (2017)

Awards and highlights
- Second-team All-WAC (2008); CAFL All-Pro South Division All-Star (2016); Judge Spirit Award (2016)

Career AFL statistics
- Receptions: 578
- Receiving yards: 7,145
- Receiving TDs: 146
- Return yards: 1,157
- Return TDs: 3
- Stats at ArenaFan.com

Michael Washington (born October 19, 1986) is an American football wide receiver. He played college football for the Hawaii Rainbow Warriors. He was signed by the Pittsburgh Power as an undrafted free agent in 2011.

== Early life ==
Washington attended Aliquippa Senior High School in Aliquippa, Pennsylvania, where he was a member of the football team as well as the track and field team.

College recruiting
Name	Hometown	School	Height	Weight	40^{‡}	Commit date
Mike Washington; WR	Aliquippa, Pennsylvania	Aliquippa Senior High School	5 ft 7 in (1.70 m)	160 lb (73 kg)	4.33	Jan 26, 2005
Mike Washington; WR	Recruit ratings: Scout: Rivals: 247Sports:					
Overall recruit ranking: Scout: 172 (CB) Rivals: -- (WR), -- (PA)
Note: In many cases, Scout, Rivals, 247Sports, On3, and ESPN may conflict in their listings of height and weight.; In these cases, the average was taken. ESPN grades are on a 100-point scale.; Sources: "Hawaii Commitment List". Scout.; "Scout.com Team Recruiting Rankings". Scout.; "2005 Team Ranking". Rivals.com.

== College career ==
Washington committed to the University of Hawaiʻi at Mānoa on January 26, 2005. He played sparingly for his first three seasons with the Rainbow Warriors. Washington saw a much larger role as a senior in 2008, catching 62 passes for 789 yards and six receiving touchdowns. He was named second-team All-Western Athletic Conference.

=== Statistics ===
Year	Team	Receiving				Rushing				Kick return				Punt return			
Year	Team	Rec	Yards	Avg	TDs	Att	Yards	Avg	TDs	Ret	Yards	Avg	TDs	Ret	Yards	Avg	TDs
2005	Hawaii	13	86	6.6	0	0	0	0.0	0	0	0	0.0	0	0	0	0	0
2006	Hawaii	3	50	16.7	0	0	0	0.0	0	0	0	0.0	0	0	0	0	0
2007	Hawaii	3	51	17.0	1	0	0	0.0	0	9	137	15.2	0	5	104	20.8	1
2008	Hawaii	62	789	12.7	6	2	9	4.5	0	0	0	0.0	0	19	17	0.9	0
NCAA career totals		81	976	12.1	7	2	9	4.5	0	9	137	15.2	0	24	121	5.0	1

== Professional career ==
Pre-draft measurables
Height	Weight
5 ft 7 3/8 in (1.71 m)	176 lb (80 kg)
Values from NFL Draft

=== Pittsburgh Power ===
On October 21, 2010, Washington was assigned to the Pittsburgh Power. Washington played a large role for the expansion Power. Washington returned to the Power in 2013 on a new three-year contract.

=== Spokane Shock ===
In October 2013, Washington was traded to the Spokane Shock for Arvell Nelson and Ben Ossai.

=== Arizona Rattlers ===
On March 2, 2016, Washington was assigned to the Arizona Rattlers.

=== Tampa Bay Storm ===
On April 21, 2016, Washington was traded to the Tampa Bay Storm for future considerations. On June 7, 2016, Washington was placed on reassignment. On June 9, 2016, Washington was assigned to the Storm. On June 21, 2016, Washington was placed on reassignment.

=== Shanghai Skywalkers ===
Washington was drafted by the Shanghai Skywalkers in the eighth round of the 2016 CAFL draft. He earned Judge Spirit Award and All-Pro South Division All-Star honors after catching 47 passes for 586 yards and 15 touchdowns. He is listed on the Skywalkers' roster for the 2018 season.

=== Washington Valor ===
Washington was assigned to the Washington Valor for the 2017 season. He was placed on inactive reserve on May 16 and then placed on injured reserve on May 30, 2017.

=== AFL statistics ===
Year	Team			
Year	Team	Rec	Yds	TD
2011	Pittsburgh	114	1,367	30
2012	Pittsburgh	115	1,484	34
2013	Pittsburgh	136	1,595	36
2014	Spokane	106	1,356	23
2015	Spokane	59	801	15
2016	Arizona	1	17	0
2016	Tampa Bay	29	288	3
2017	Washington	18	237	5
Career		578	7,145	146
