= Dieker =

Dieker may refer to:

- Chris Dieker (born 1987), American football player
- Miller–Dieker syndrome, micro deletion syndrome
