= Cameron McGlenn =

American football player (1988–2020)

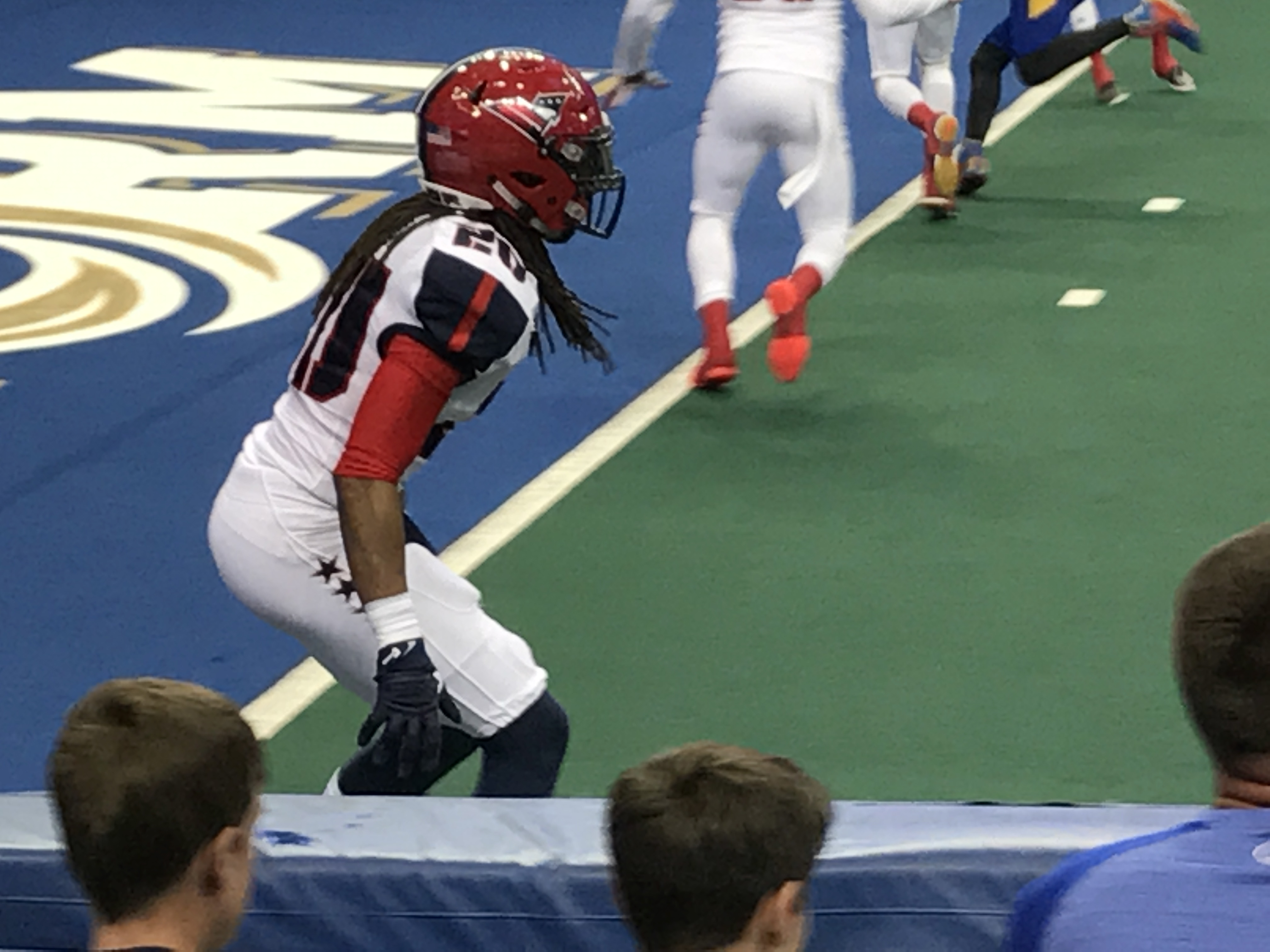
- McGlenn in 2017

No. 18, 20
- Position: Defensive back

Personal information
- Born: February 16, 1988; Belmont, North Carolina, U.S.
- Died: May 6, 2020 (aged 32); Charlotte, North Carolina, U.S.
- Listed height: 6 ft 0 in (1.83 m)
- Listed weight: 185 lb (84 kg)

Career information
- High school: Belmont (NC) South Point
- College: Elon
- NFL draft: 2010: undrafted

Career history
- Iowa Barnstormers (2011–2012); Charlotte Speed (2013)*; Spokane Shock (2013); New Orleans VooDoo (2013–2015); Tampa Bay Storm (2016); Guangzhou Power (2016); Washington Valor (2017)
- * Offseason or practice squad member only

Awards and highlights
- Second Team All-Arena (2014); CAFL All-Pro South Division All-Star (2016)

Career AFL statistics
- Total tackles: 547.5
- Interceptions: 39
- Passes defensed: 88
- Stats at ArenaFan.com

Cameron McGlenn (February 16, 1988 – May 6, 2020) was an American arena football defensive back. He played college football for Elon.

== Early life ==
McGlenn attended South Point High School in Belmont, North Carolina. While at South Point, McGlenn was a member of the football and track and field teams.

== Professional career ==
=== Iowa Barnstormers ===
After going undrafted. McGlenn was assigned to the Iowa Barnstormers of the Arena Football League. McGlenn played two seasons for the Barnstormers, leading the team in tackles both season.

=== Charlotte Speed ===
McGlenn was announced as a signee of the Charlotte Speed, who intended to play in the Professional Indoor Football League, but the team never made it to the field, folding before the season began.

=== Spokane Shock ===
McGlenn was assigned to the Spokane Shock for the 2013 season. McGlenn was reassigned 10 weeks into the season.

=== New Orleans VooDoo ===
After his release, McGlenn was assigned to the New Orleans VooDoo. In his first game with the VooDoo, McGlenn had two interceptions.

=== Tampa Bay Storm ===
On October 16, 2015, McGlenn was assigned to the Tampa Bay Storm.

=== Guangzhou Power ===
McGlenn played for the Guangzhou Power of the China Arena Football League (CAFL) in 2016 and earned All-Pro South Division All-Star honors.

=== Washington Valor ===
McGlenn was assigned to the Washington Valor on January 9, 2017.

== Death ==
At 3:48 a.m. on May 6, 2020, after McGlenn's vehicle ran out of gas, he attempted to cross Interstate 485 on foot and was struck by the driver of an oncoming vehicle, killing him instantly.
