= Tanner Varner =

American football player (born 1984)

No. 20
- Position: Linebacker

Personal information
- Born: July 13, 1984 (age 42)
- Listed height: 6 ft 0 in (1.83 m)
- Listed weight: 205 lb (93 kg)

Career information
- High school: Ottumwa (Ottumwa, Iowa)
- College: Northern Iowa
- NFL draft: 2006: undrafted

Career history
- Arkansas Twisters (2007); Grand Rapids Rampage (2008)*; Iowa Barnstormers (2008–2010); Philadelphia Soul (2011); Omaha Nighthawks (2011); Kansas City Command (2012); San Jose SaberCats (2012); Orlando Predators (2013–2014); Las Vegas Outlaws (2015); Qingdao Clipper (2016)
- * Offseason or practice squad member only

Awards and highlights
- 2× First-team All-Arena (2010, 2014); CAFL Dream Team (2016)

Career AFL statistics
- Tackles: 394.5
- Sacks: 2
- Interceptions: 25
- Forced Fumbles: 7
- Total Touchdowns: 9
- Stats at ArenaFan.com

Tanner Varner (born July 13, 1984) is an American former professional football linebacker who played in the Arena Football League (AFL). He first enrolled at Ellsworth Community College before transferring to the University of Northern Iowa. Varner was a member of the Arkansas Twisters, Grand Rapids Rampage, Iowa Barnstormers, Philadelphia Soul, Omaha Nighthawks, Kansas City Command, San Jose SaberCats, Orlando Predators, Las Vegas Outlaws, and Qingdao Clipper.

== Early life ==
Varner played high school football at Ottumwa High School in Ottumwa, Iowa He was inducted into the Ottumwa High School Athletics Hall of Fame in 2024.

== College career ==
Varner first played college football for the Ellsworth Community College Panthers from 2002 to 2003.

Varner transferred to play for the Northern Iowa Panthers of the University of Northern Iowa from 2004 to 2005. He recorded 85.5 tackles and three interceptions his senior year, earning first team All-American and All Gateway Conference honors while being named the Panthers’s most valuable defensive player. He was also named the Defensive MVP of the 2005 Division I-AA National Championship game.

== Professional career ==
Varner played for the Arkansas Twisters of the af2 in 2007. He finished third on the team with 83.5 tackles, recorded nine interceptions, returning one for a touchdown and earning second team All-Conference honors.

Varner signed with the Grand Rapids Rampage on October 30, 2007. He was released by the Rampage on February 23, 2008.

Varner played for the Iowa Barnstormers from 2008 to 2010. The Barnstormers were members of the af2 from 2008 to 2009, before returning to the Arena Football League (AFL) in 2010. He posted 91 tackles, seven interceptions and two forced fumbles in 2008. He recorded 119.5 tackles, 19 pass breakups, eight interceptions and two forced fumbles in 2009, earning second-team All-American Conference honors. Varner set an AFL rookie record for tackles in a season with 129.5 total tackles in 2010, earning first-team All-Arena honors. He also ranked fourth in the league with eight interceptions in 2010, returning two for touchdowns. His 129.5 tackles also set the Barnstormers single-season record.

Varner was signed by the Philadelphia Soul on December 21, 2010. He recorded 45 total tackles, intercepted five passes, forced a fumble and returned two interceptions for touchdowns in seven games with the Soul in 2011.

Varner spent the 2011 UFL season with the Omaha Nighthawks of the United Football League.

Varner was traded to the Kansas City Command on March 14, 2012.

On March 20, 2012, Varner was traded to the San Jose SaberCats for the second and fifth AFL claim order positions. He recorded 63 tackles, two sacks, two forced fumbles, two fumble recoveries and three interceptions in 12 games for the Sabercats in 2012.

Varner signed with the Orlando Predators on July 10, 2013. He earned first-team All-Arena honors after recording 68 tackles and five interceptions in 18 games with the Predators in 2014.

Varner was selected by the Las Vegas Outlaws with the first pick of the 2014 Expansion Draft. He became a free agent after the 2015 season.

Varner was selected by the Qingdao Clipper in the tenth round of the 2016 CAFL draft. He was named to the CAFL Dream Team in 2016.
