= 2016 CAFL season =

- League: China Arena Football League
- Sport: Arena football
- Duration: Regular season: October 1 – October 30; Postseason: November 5 – November 6
- Number of games: 18
- Number of teams: 6

China Bowl
- Champions: Beijing Lions (1st title)
- Runners-up: Qingdao Clipper

CAFL seasons
- 2019 →

The 2016 CAFL season, the first season in the history of the China Arena Football League (CAFL), began on October 1, 2016. On November 6, the Beijing Lions defeated the Qingdao Clipper to win the first China Bowl.

== Draft ==
The league held its first draft on June 10, 2016. 120 players were drafted with 60 of them being Americans, including 43 who have Arena Football League experience. 60 players from China or players who are of Chinese descent were selected as well. On June 15, the league held a supplemental draft (rounds 21 to 22) in which an additional 12 players were selected.

Note: The picks are not in chronological order. They are a list of picks by team and the round they were selected in. For example, Guangzhou did not select first in every round.

Round	Guangzhou	Dalian	Shanghai	Shenzhen	Qingdao	Beijing
1	David Wang – OL (CN)	Joe Hills – WR	Shane Austin – QB	Du Feng – DL (CN)	Bryan Randall – QB	Wayne Tribue – OL
2	Brennen Carvalho – OL	Billy Lai – OL (CN)	Liu Shuai – WR (CN)	Wang Shida – DB (CN)	Jason Holman – OL/DL	Neal Tivis – OL
3	Yang Hao – LB (CN)	Talib Wise – WR	Dwayne Hollis – DB	Zhang Jia Qi – OL (CN)	Jake Metz – OL/DL	James Romain – DB
4	Tyre Glasper – LB	Kwok-Wing Steve Tang – DL (CN)	Shaun Kauleinamoku – WR	Colin Madison – OL	Rayshaun Kizer – DB	Teddy Jennings – DL
5	Dexter Davis Jr. – DL	Phillip Garcia – QB	Justin Lawrence – DL	Xin Xu – DL (CN)	Joe Phinisee – DB	Collin Taylor -WR
6	Andre Martin – WR/DB	Yan Li Guang – DL (CN)	Wang Lei – DB (CN)	Robert Williams Jr – DL	Kevin Kuo – OL/DL (CN)	Paul Chih-Ping Cheng – DL (CN)
7	Frank Trotter – DL	Ameer Ismail – LB	Gu Xu Bing – FB (CN)	Dak Britt – QB	Xavier Boyce – WR	Chris Dieker – QB
8	Qiu Xun Da – WR (CN)	Qu San Zhi – OL/DL (CN)	Mike Washington – WR	Terrance Smith – DB	Sun Shuo – OL/DL (CN)	Xing Long Xiong – WR (CN)
9	Duane Brooks – WR	Jarrod Hernandez – OL	Zhang Dong Sheng – OL/DL (CN)	Adrian Ferns – FB/LB	Reggie Gray – WR	Calvin Fance – DL
10	Lavasier Tuinei – WR/DB	Wang Bing – DB (CN)	Willie McGinnis – DL	Larry Max Westphal – OL	Tanner Varner – DB	Zhang Tian Hao – OL/DL (CN)
11	Sun Mo Han – OL/DL (CN)	Jordan Mosely – OL	Travis Miller – OL/DL	Han Shao Chuan – LB (CN)	Zhang Tian Shou – FB/LB (CN)	Tsu Yao Lam – WR/DB (CN)
12	JJ Raterink – QB	Fan Zheng Yu – LB (CN)	Xu You Peng – OL/DL (CN)	Tristan Purifoy – WR	He Shi Lei – WR/DB (CN)	Chen Yun Chen – OL/DL (CN)
13	Li An – DL (CN)	Kent Richardson – DB	Zhao Zhen Nan – WR/DB (CN)	Shen Yu Lan – FB (CN)	Matt Moss – DL	Zhang Xiao Zha – WR (CN)
14	Liang Xin Hao – WR (CN)	Kap IP – WR (CN)	Christian Wise – WR/DB	David Hong – OL/DL (CN)	Wondell Rutledge – OL/DL	Erwin Sennett Wu – DB (CN)
15	Virgil Gray – DB	Darnell Burks – DB	Taylor Russolino – K	LaChristopher Lee – WR	Yang Peng Sheng – DB (CN)	Junxing Zhang – WR/DB (CN)
16	Ma Jin Hui – DB (CN)	Ma Zhen – WR (CN)	Kevin Bartie – DB	Xu Xin Tian – WR (CN)	A Tie – OL/DL (CN)	Chris Hemphill – WR/DB
17	Zhang Hai Tao – OL/DL (CN)	Maurice Woodard – WR/DB	Zheng Yu Jiang – FB (CN)	Lin Yi Hong – DB (CN)	Baihetiyaer Tuerxun – WR/DB (CN)	Li Xiang – OL/DL (CN)
18	Guo Xu – OL/DL (CN)	Lai Shan Yu – WR/DB (CN)	Tian Ye – FB/LB (CN)	John Keith – DB	Zhang Tian Chu – WR/DB (CN)	Pat Clarke – K
19	Alex Carder – QB	Anthony Sanders III – DL	Xiao Yu – OL/DL (CN)	Kimo Naehu – K	Guo Rui Bin – K (CN)	Zhang Xiang Yu – OL/DL (CN)
20	Zao Yun – WR (CN)	Xu Chang – FB/LB (CN)	Xie Kun – QB (CN)	Lui Sze Ting – DB (CN)	Wang Shi Xue – LB (CN)	Luke Collis – QB
21	Luis Vasquez – DL	Qui Zixuan – K (CN)	Fan Rong – OL/DL (CN)	Yu Tao – QB (CN)	Sean Brackett – QB	Rustin Mayorga – FB
22	Ding Long – K (CN)	Jawad Yatim – QB	Sergio Gilliam – WR	Elvis Matagi – DL	Li Chao Ren – K (CN)	Chen Long – QB (CN)

- CN indicates Chinese national or of Chinese descent

== Regular season ==
Week 1

Date	Kickoff	Away	Score	Home	Game site	Recap
October 1	2:00 p.m.	Guangzhou Power	35–38	Qingdao Clipper	LeSports Center (Beijing)	
October 1	7:00 p.m.	Dalian Dragon Kings	19–47	Shenzhen Naja	LeSports Center (Beijing)	
October 2	3:00 p.m.	Shanghai Skywalkers	53–54 (OT)	Beijing Lions	LeSports Center (Beijing)	

Week 2

Date	Kickoff	Away	Score	Home	Game site	Recap
October 8	11:00 a.m.	Guangzhou Power	32–45	Shanghai Skywalkers	Damai Center (Dalian)	
October 9	3:00 p.m.	Shenzhen Naja	41–48	Beijing Lions	Damai Center (Dalian)	
October 9	7:00 p.m.	Qingdao Clipper	43–36	Dalian Dragon Kings	Damai Center (Dalian)	

Week 3

Date	Kickoff	Away	Score	Home	Game site	Recap
October 15	2:00 p.m.	Shanghai Skywalkers	61–48	Shenzhen Naja	Guoxin Gymnasium (Qingdao)	
October 15	7:00 p.m.	Dalian Dragon Kings	7–40	Guangzhou Power	Guoxin Gymnasium (Qingdao)	
October 16	3:00 p.m.	Beijing Lions	47–33	Qingdao Clipper	Guoxin Gymnasium (Qingdao)	

Week 4

Date	Kickoff	Away	Score	Home	Game site	Recap
October 22	2:00 p.m.	Beijing Lions	70–25	Dalian Dragon Kings	Guangzhou Gymnasium (Guangzhou)	
October 22	7:00 p.m.	Qingdao Clipper	51–49	Shanghai Skywalkers	Guangzhou Gymnasium (Guangzhou)	
October 23	3:00 p.m.	Shenzhen Naja	39–47	Guangzhou Power	Guangzhou Gymnasium (Guangzhou)	

Week 5

Date	Kickoff	Away	Score	Home	Game site	Recap
October 29	2:00 p.m.	Dalian Dragon Kings	21–63	Shanghai Skywalkers	Shenzhen Dayun Arena (Shenzhen)	
October 29	7:00 p.m.	Beijing Lions	55–32	Guangzhou Power	Shenzhen Dayun Arena (Shenzhen)	
October 30	3:00 p.m.	Qingdao Clipper	40–47	Shenzhen Naja	Shenzhen Dayun Arena (Shenzhen)	

Standings

2016 CAFL standings
Team	Overall			Points		Records	
Team	W	L	PCT	PF	PA	Home	Away
Beijing Lions	5	0	1.000	274	184	2–0	3–0
Qingdao Clipper	3	2	.600	205	204	1–1	2–1
Shanghai Skywalkers	3	2	.600	271	206	2–1	1–1
Guangzhou Power	2	3	.400	186	184	2–1	0–2
Shenzhen Naja	2	3	.400	222	215	2–1	0–2
Dalian Dragon Kings	0	5	.000	98	263	0–2	0–3

== Postseason ==
5th-place game

Date	Kickoff	Away	Score	Home	Game site	Recap
November 5	2:00 p.m.	Dalian Dragon Kings	30–46	Shenzhen Naja	Shanghai Oriental Sports Center (Shanghai)	

3rd-place game

Date	Kickoff	Away	Score	Home	Game site	Recap
November 5	7:00 p.m.	Guangzhou Power	52–57	Shanghai Skywalkers	Shanghai Oriental Sports Center (Shanghai)	

China Bowl

Date	Kickoff	Away	Score	Home	Game site	Recap
November 6	3:00 p.m.	Qingdao Clipper	34–35	Beijing Lions	Shanghai Oriental Sports Center (Shanghai)	

== Awards ==
=== Individual season awards ===
Note: The Steel-man is named for his "all around excellence at several positions". The Judge Spirit Award, named after CAFL founder Marty Judge, is given for "exemplifying football excellence, leadership and special contribution to the league".

Award	Winner	Position	Team
Offensive MVP	Shane Austin	Quarterback	Shanghai
Defensive MVP	Torez Jones	Defensive back	Beijing
Steel-man	James Romain	Defensive back/receiver/kick returner	Beijing
Judge Spirit Award	Mike Washington	Wide receiver	Shanghai

=== All-Pro teams ===
All-Pro North Division All-Stars

Offense
Quarterback	Luke Collis, Beijing
Wide receiver	Collin Taylor, Beijing; Reggie Gray, Qingdao; Tian Chu Zhang, Qingdao
Fullback	Rustin Mayorga, Beijing
Offensive lineman	Wayne Tribue, Beijing; Neal Tivis, Beijing; Tian Hao Zhang, Beijing

Defense
Defensive lineman	Calvin Fance, Beijing; Paul Cheng, Beijing; Steve Tang, Dalian
Jack linebacker	Ameer Ismail, Dalian
Middle linebacker	Jake Metz, Qingdao
Defensive back	Torez Jones, Beijing; James Romain, Beijing; Kent Richardson, Dalian

Other
Placekicker	Patrick Clarke III, Beijing
Athlete	Bryan Randall, quarterback, Qingdao; Talib Wise, wide receiver, Dalian; Siguang Yan, defensive lineman, Dalian

Coaches
Head coach	Clint Dolezel, Beijing
Assistant coach	Steve Criswell, Qingdao
Chinese assistant coach	Jeff Mei, Beijing

All-Pro South Division All-Stars

Offense
Quarterback	Shane Austin, Shanghai
Wide receiver	Mike Washington, Shanghai; Shaun Kauleinamoku, Shanghai; Xu Xin He, Shenzhen
Fullback	Dashawn Johnson, Guangzhou
Offensive lineman	David Wang, Guangzhou; Travis Miller, Shanghai; Max Westphal, Shenzhen

Defense
Defensive lineman	Robert Williams, Shenzhen; Frank Trotter, Guangzhou; Willie McGinnis, Shanghai
Jack linebacker	Ling Zi Hao, Guangzhou
Middle linebacker	Tyre Glasper, Guangzhou
Defensive back	Cameron McGlenn, Guangzhou; Dwayne Hollis, Shanghai; Wang Lei, Shanghai

Other
Placekicker	Taylor Russolino, Shanghai
Athlete	Dak Britt, quarterback, Shenzhen; LaChristopher Lee, kick returner, Guangzhou; Guxu Bing Fe, fullback, Shanghai

Coaches
Head coach	J.W. Kenton, Shenzhen
Assistant coach	John Lyles, Shanghai
Chinese assistant coach	Robert Wang, Guangzhou

=== Dream Team ===
The CAFL Dream Team was selected by fan vote.

Dream Team
Quarterback	Dak Britt, Shenzhen
Offensive lineman	Jia Qi Zhang, Shenzhen
Defensive lineman	Robert Williams, Shenzhen
Running back/Fullback	Dashawn Johnson, Guangzhou
Wide receiver	Xu Xin He, Shenzhen
Defensive back	Tanner Varner, Qingdao
Linebacker/Middle linebacker	Hong Jia Wei David, Shenzhen
Kicker	Taylor Russolino, Shanghai
