= Damai Center =

Sports venue in Dalian, China

Damai Centre
- 大麦体育文化中心
- Former names: Dalian Arena (2013–2016)
- Location: Dalian, Liaoning, People's Republic of China
- Owner: Dalian Government
- Operator: Anschutz Entertainment Group
- Capacity: 18,000

Construction
- Opened: 2 October 2013

Tenants
- 2013 National Games of China; Dalian Dragon Kings (2016)

The Damai Centre (Chinese: 大麦体育文化中心) is a multi-purpose indoor arena located in Dalian, China. It was completed in 2012 for the 2013 National Games of the People's Republic of China. It hosted the basketball and gymnastics events. The capacity of the arena is 18,000 spectators. It was formerly known as Dalian Arena.

It is used for various events, like basketball, boxing, concerts, gymnastics, mixed martial arts and table tennis.

Justin Bieber became the first artist to perform at the arena during his Believe Tour on 2 October 2013.

== See also ==
- List of indoor arenas in China
- List of indoor arenas by capacity
