= Dalian Dragon Kings =

Professional football team

- Founded: 2016
- Team history: Dalian Dragon Kings (2016); Shenyang Rhinos (2018–2019)
- Based in: Shenyang, Liaoning, China
- Home arena: Damai Center (2016)
- League: China Arena Football League (2016–2019)
- Colors: Dalian Dragon Kings: Deep Sky Blue, Black, Gold

Personnel
- Head coach: Robert Gordon

Playoff appearances (1)
- 2016

The Dalian Dragon Kings were a professional arena football team based in Dalian participating as members of the China Arena Football League (CAFL). Their home stadium was the Damai Center. In 2017, the Dragon Kings relocated to Shenyang, Liaoning, to become the Shenyang Black Rhinos.

== Seasons ==
Season	League	Regular season			Postseason results	Head coach
Season	League	Finish	Wins	Losses	Postseason results	Head coach
Dalian Dragon Kings
2016	CAFL	6th	0	5	Lost 5th-place game (Shenzhen) 30–46	Terry Bates
Shenyang Rhinos
2019	CAFL					Robert Gordon
Total			0	5	(Includes only regular season)	
Total			0	1	(Includes only playoffs)	
Total			0	6	(Includes both regular season and playoffs)	
