= Shanghai Skywalkers =

Chinese arena football team

- Founded: 2016
- Team history: Shanghai Skywalkers (2016)
- Based in: Shanghai Oriental Sports Center in Shanghai, China
- Home arena: Shanghai Oriental Sports Center (2016)
- League: China Arena Football League (2016)
- Colors: Cerulean, Oxford Blue, Gold, White

Personnel
- Head coach: Derek Stingley

Playoff appearances (1)
- 2016

The Shanghai Skywalkers were a professional arena football team based in Shanghai, China. They were members of the China Arena Football League (CAFL).

== Roster ==
Shanghai Skywalkers roster
Quarterbacks: 10 Shane Austin; 7 Kun Xie; Fullbacks: Currently vacant; Wide receivers: 21 Shaun Kauleinamoku; 7 Mike Washington	Offensive linemen: Currently vacant; Defensive linemen: Currently vacant	Linebackers: Currently vacant; Defensive backs: Currently vacant; Kicker: Currently vacant	Injured reserve: Currently vacant; Refused to report: Currently vacant; League suspension: Currently vacant; Other league exempt: Currently vacant; Inactive reserve: Currently vacant; Recallable reassignment: Currently vacant; Roster updated September 26, 2016 22 Active, 0 Inactive

== Seasons ==
Season	League	Regular season			Postseason results	Head coach
Season	League	Finish	Wins	Losses	Postseason results	Head coach
Shanghai Skywalkers
2016	CAFL	3rd	3	2	Won 3rd-place game (Guangzhou) 57–52	Derek Stingley
Total			3	2	(Includes only regular season)	
Total			1	0	(Includes only playoffs)	
Total			4	2	(Includes both regular season and playoffs)	
