= Shenzhen Naja =

Chinese football team

- Founded: 2016
- Team history: Shenzhen Naja (2016); Wuhan Gators (2018–2019)
- Based in: Wuhan, Hubei, China
- Home arena: Shenzhen Dayun Arena (2016)
- League: China Arena Football League (2016–2019)
- Colors: Shenzhen Naja: Orange and Green

Personnel
- Head coach: J.W. Kenton

Playoff appearances (1)
- 2016

The Shenzhen Naja were a professional arena football team based in Shenzhen, Guangdong. They were members of the China Arena Football League (CAFL). They were named after the species of cobra that lives in the region. Their home stadium was the Shenzhen Dayun Arena. In 2017, the Naja relocated to Wuhan, Hubei, to become the Wuhan Gators.

== Seasons ==
Season	League	Regular season			Postseason results	Head coach
Season	League	Finish	Wins	Losses	Postseason results	Head coach
Shenzhen Naja
2016	CAFL	5th	2	3	Won 5th-place game (Dalian) 46–30	J.W. Kenton
Wuhan Gators
2019	CAFL					J.W. Kenton
Total			2	3	(Includes only regular season)	
Total			1	0	(Includes only playoffs)	
Total			3	3	(Includes both regular season and playoffs)	
