= Qingdao Clipper =

Chinese arena football team

- Founded: 2016
- Team history: Qingdao Clipper (2016)
- Based in: Guoxin Gymnasium in Qingdao, Shandong, China
- Home arena: Guoxin Gymnasium (2016)
- League: China Arena Football League (2016)
- Colors: Cobalt Blue, Cardinal, Myrtle Green, White

Personnel
- Head coach: Rod Miller

Playoff appearances (1)
- 2016

The Qingdao Clipper were a professional arena football team based in Qingdao, Shandong. They were members of the China Arena Football League (CAFL).

== Roster ==
Qingdao Clipper roster
Quarterbacks: 10 Sean Brackett; 3 Bryan Randall; Fullbacks: 42 Alimu Ailizhati; Wide receivers: 11 Xavier Boyce; 1 Reggie Gray; 2 Shilei He; 32 Baihetiyaer Tuerxun; 22 Tianchu Zhang	Offensive linemen: 18 Kevin Kuo; 55 Wondell Rutledge; 90 Shuo Sun; 62 Chenglin Wang; Defensive linemen: 99 Jason Holman; 98 Matt Moss	Linebackers: 5 Joe Phinisee; 16 Shixue Wang; 88 Haoran Yu; Defensive backs: 6 Rayshaun Kizer; 20 Tanner Varner; 75 Pengsheng Yang; Kicker: 12 Chaoran Li	Injured reserve: Currently vacant; Refused to report: Currently vacant; League suspension: Currently vacant; Other league exempt: Currently vacant; Inactive reserve: Currently vacant; Recallable reassignment: Currently vacant; Roster updated September 26, 2016; 22 Active, 0 Inactive

== Seasons ==
Season	League	Regular season			Postseason results	Head coach
Season	League	Finish	Wins	Losses	Postseason results	Head coach
Qingdao Clipper
2016	CAFL	2nd	3	2	Lost China Bowl (Beijing) 34–35	Rod Miller
Total			3	2	(Includes only regular season)	
Total			0	1	(Includes only playoffs)	
Total			3	3	(Includes both regular season and playoffs)	
