= Beijing Lions =

- Founded: 2016
- Team history: Beijing Lions (2016–2019)
- Based in: LeSports Center in Beijing, China
- Home arena: LeSports Center (2016)
- League: China Arena Football League (2016–2019)
- Colors: Metallic Gold, Black, White

Personnel
- Head coach: Clint Dolezel
- Owner: Stephon Marbury

Championships
- League titles (1): 2016

Playoff appearances (1)
- 2016

The Beijing Lions were a professional arena football team based in Beijing, China. They were members of the China Arena Football League (CAFL). They won the China Bowl in 2016.

== History ==
The Beijing Lions were one of the first six teams to play in the China Arena Football League. They finished the 2016 season with a perfect record of 6–0 and won the league title by beating the Qingdao Clipper 35–34 on a last second field goal in the first China Bowl. On October 20, 2017, it was announced that Stephon Marbury had reached an agreement to become the owner of the Lions.

== Seasons ==
Season	League	Regular season			Postseason results	Head coach
Season	League	Finish	Wins	Losses	Postseason results	Head coach
Beijing Lions
2016	CAFL	1st	5	0	Won China Bowl (Qingdao) 35–34	Clint Dolezel
Total			5	0	(Includes only regular season)	
Total			1	0	(Includes only playoffs)	
Total			6	0	(Includes both regular season and playoffs)	
