= China Bowl (CAFL) =

- First played: November 6, 2016; 8 years ago
- Trophy: The Martin Judge Jr. Trophy

The China Bowl was the season ending championship game for the China Arena Football League (CAFL).

== Trophy ==
The China Bowl champion receives the Martin Judge Jr. Trophy

== Results ==
Game	Date	Winning team		Losing team		Site
China Bowl	November 6, 2016	Beijing Lions	35	Qingdao Clipper	34	Shanghai Oriental Sports Center
