= Guangzhou Power =

Chinese arena football team

- Founded: 2016
- Team history: Guangzhou Power (2016)
- Based in: Guangzhou Gymnasium in Guangzhou, Guangdong, China
- Home arena: Guangzhou Gymnasium (2016)
- League: China Arena Football League (2016)
- Colors: Grey, Black

Personnel
- Head coach: Ernesto Purnsley

Playoff appearances (1)
- 2016

The Guangzhou Power was a professional arena football team based in Guangzhou, Guangdong. They were members of the China Arena Football League (CAFL).

== Seasons ==
Season	League	Regular season			Postseason results	Head coach
Season	League	Finish	Wins	Losses	Postseason results	Head coach
Guangzhou Power
2016	CAFL	4th	2	3	Lost 3rd-place game (Shanghai) 52–57	Ernesto Purnsley
Total			2	3	(Includes only regular season)	
Total			0	1	(Includes only playoffs)	
Total			2	4	(Includes both regular season and playoffs)	
