= 2019 CAFL season =

- League: China Arena Football League
- Sport: Arena football
- Duration: November 13—23, 2019
- Games: 4
- Teams: 4
- Finals champions: Wuhan Gators (1st title)
- Runners-up: Beijing Lions

CAFL seasons
- ← 2016

The 2019 CAFL season was the second season of the China Arena Football League (CAFL).

== Background ==
After the 2016 season, the Dalian Dragon Kings and Shenzhen Naja relocated to become the Shenyang Black Rhinos and Wuhan Gators, respectively. In June 2017, it was announced that the 2017 season was being moved to the spring of 2018. In January 2018, the league postponed the start of their second season to continue to establish business partnerships in China. The league has targeted a return to play in the autumn of 2019.

In September 2019, the CAFL released an abbreviated schedule, with a two-game regular season and a playoff tournament featuring all four teams, with games played November 6, 9, 20 and 23. Uniquely among professional football leagues, the CAFL playoff seeds were set as part of the schedule, with the semifinal round (December 6) consisting of the two matchups that did not play in the regular season. The winners of the semifinal round will play for the championship two days after the semifinals, and the losers for a consolation game the same day.

On November 8, the CAFL announced that the first game had been postponed to November 13. Two days later, the league announced that the regular season was canceled and that two of the four games scheduled would be played as exhibition games. In lieu of a regular season or semi-final playoffs, the CAFL instead held a single round-robin tournament with each team playing the other for 12 minutes, with no overtime in the event of a tie. The standings following those contests will then be used to seed the championship: the two lowest-ranked teams played a consolation round, and the two highest-ranked played for the CAFL championship. Both games were 24 minutes long, separated into two 12-minute halves, with overtime if necessary (which it was for the championship). The entirety of the CAFL tournament took place in Suzhou over the course of three days. All of the league games for the season were played at EtonHouse International School Suzhou.

== Standings ==
- Wuhan Gators: 4–0
- Beijing Lions: 2–2
- Shenyang Rhinos: 1–3+
- Shanghai Skywalkers: 1–3

+ = Shenyang secured third place by way of defeating Shanghai in the consolation game.

== Draft ==
2017 CAFL draft

The 2017 CAFL Draft was held on July 10, 2017. 36 players were drafted with 18 of them being Americans and 18 players from China or who are of Chinese descent.

=== Round one ===
Pick #	Team	Player	Position	Status
1	Shenyang Black Rhinos	Chris Dieker	QB	IN
2	Wuhan Gators	Boqiao Li	DE	CN
3	Guangzhou Power	Tang Canming	OL	CN
4	Shanghai Skywalkers	Yang Shunjun	LB	CN
5	Qingdao Clipper	Cheng Chi Sing	WR / DB	CN
6	Beijing Lions	Mike Chiang	DB	CN

=== Round two ===
Pick #	Team	Player	Position	Status
7	Shenyang Black Rhinos	Liang Jianbang	WR	CN
8	Wuhan Gators	Du Xuan Ting	OL	CN
9	Guangzhou Power	Huang Zhiqian	WR / DB	CN
10	Shanghai Skywalkers	Marrio Norman	DB	IN
11	Qingdao Clipper	Fen Chao	OL / DL	CN
12	Beijing Lions	Huang Lingjie	DL	CN

=== Round three ===
Pick #	Team	Player	Position	Status
13	Shenyang Black Rhinos	Chad Kolumber	OL	IN
14	Wuhan Gators	Zhang Zhengzhi	RB	CN
15	Guangzhou Power	Shi Yiqing	QB	CN
16	Shanghai Skywalkers	Raymond McNeil	OL	IN
17	Qingdao Clipper	Brenden Daley	DL	IN
18	Beijing Lions	Nick Seither	OL / DL	IN

=== Round four ===
Pick #	Team	Player	Position	Status
19	Shenyang Black Rhinos	Kyle Marley	OL / DL	IN
20	Wuhan Gators	Dionte Savage	OL	IN
21	Guangzhou Power	Dexter Davis	DL	IN
22	Shanghai Skywalkers	Zhang Chenxu	WR / DB	CN
23	Qingdao Clipper	Elbert Mack	DB	IN
24	Beijing Lions	Bryce Gauw	WR	CN

=== Round five ===
Pick #	Team	Player	Position	Status
25	Shenyang Black Rhinos	Su Mengtong	OL / DL	CN
26	Wuhan Gators	Monte Lewis	DL	IN
27	Guangzhou Power	Darius Reynolds	WR	IN
28	Shanghai Skywalkers	Li Xin	C / OL	CN
29	Qingdao Clipper	Bret Piekarski	OL	IN
30	Beijing Lions	DeAndre Perry	QB / WR	IN

=== Round six ===
Pick #	Team	Player	Position	Status
31	Shenyang Black Rhinos	Zheng Yu Fan	WR	CN
32	Wuhan Gators	Jarred Evans	DB / QB / LB	IN
33	Guangzhou Power	Andre Martin	DB	IN
34	Shanghai Skywalkers	Byron Johnson II	WR	IN
35	Qingdao Clipper	Luo Lein Wen Yu	DL / OL	CN
36	Beijing Lions	Poppy Livers	WR	IN

Note: CN indicates Chinese national or of Chinese descent while IN indicates international players
