= 2017 Philadelphia Soul season =

Arena Football League team season

- Owner: Ron Jaworski; Craig Spencer; Pete Ciarrocchi
- General manager: Phil Bogle
- Head coach: Clint Dolezel
- Home stadium: Wells Fargo Center

Results
- Record: 13–1
- League place: 1st
- Playoffs: Won Semifinals 69–54 (Brigade); Won ArenaBowl XXX 44–40 (Storm)

The 2017 Philadelphia Soul season was the twelfth season for the franchise in the Arena Football League. The Soul played at the Wells Fargo Center. The Soul won their second ArenaBowl the previous season beating the Arizona Rattlers. The Soul lost once in the regular season and repeated as ArenaBowl Champions in the playoffs after defeating the Tampa Bay Storm 44–40 in ArenaBowl XXX.

== Staff ==
2017 Philadelphia Soul staff
Front office: Majority owner – Craig A. Spencer; Majority owner – Ron Jaworski; Ownership group – Pete Ciarrocchi; Ownership group – Cosmo DeNicola; Ownership group – Martin E. Judge; Ownership Group - Marques Colston; Ownership Group - Dick Vermeil; Ownership Group - Nicholas Giuffre; Ownership Group - Jahri Evans; Ownership Group - Philip Jaurigue; Ownership Group - Stewart Anmuth; Ownership Group - Gil Peter; Ownership Group - Hal Brunson; Vice President/COO – John Adams; General manager – Phil Bogle; CIO – Greg Strickland	Head coach: Head coach – Clint Dolezel; Offensive coaches: Assistant head coach – Phil Bogle; Offensive Coordinator - Steve Criswell; Defensive coaches: Defensive backs – Bernie Nowotarski

== Roster ==
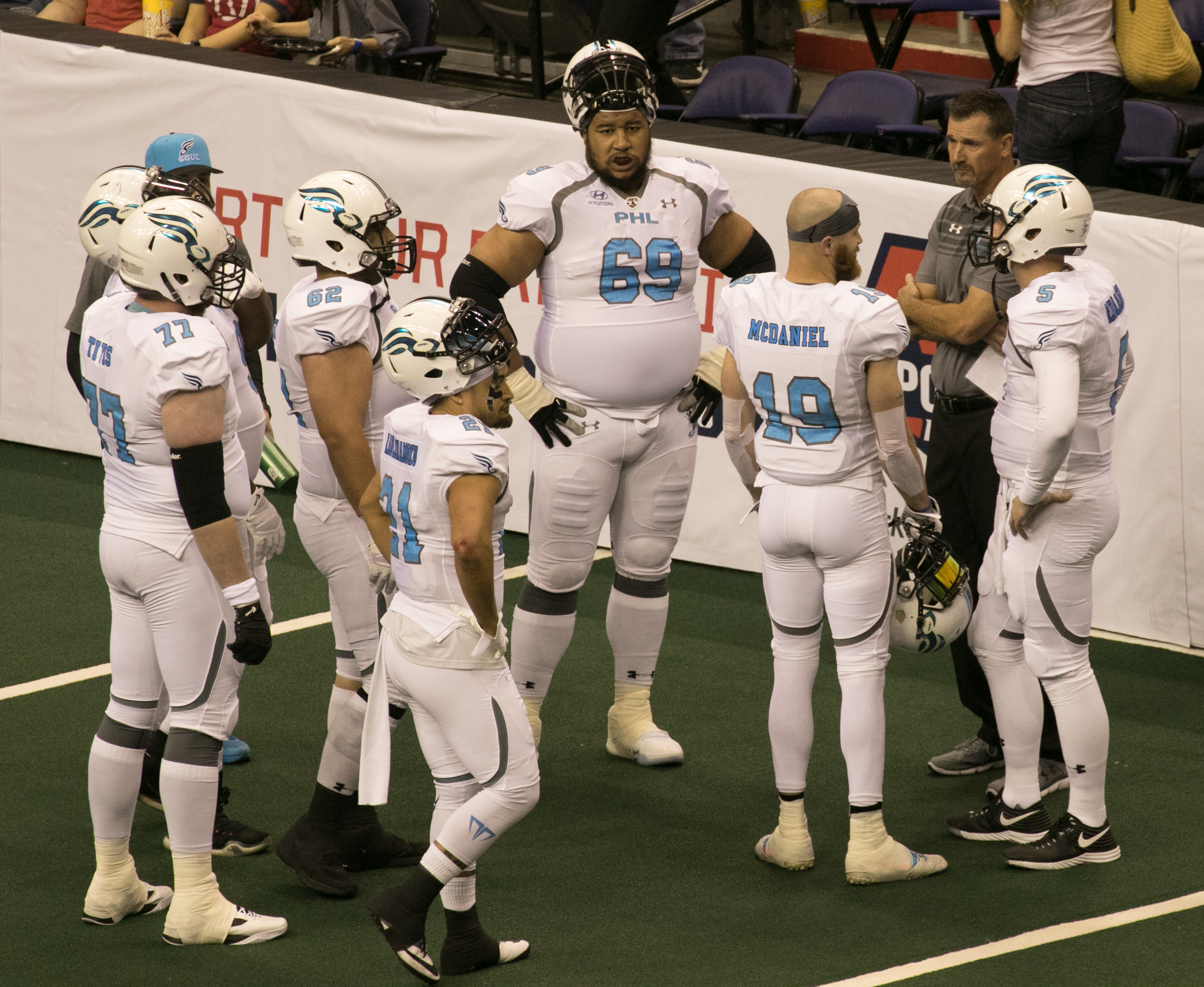
The Soul on May 27

2017 Philadelphia Soul roster
Quarterbacks: 3 Luke Collis; 5 Dan Raudabaugh; Fullbacks: 9 Mykel Benson; Wide receivers: 8 Larry Beavers; 1 Chris Duvalt; 21 Shaun Kauleinamoku; 6 Darius Prince; 7 Darius Reynolds	Offensive linemen: 62 Brennen Carvalho; 72 Keith Newell; 52 Michael Simons; 69 Wayne Tribue; Defensive linemen: 55 Sean Daniels; 58 Thomas Dover; 99 Justin Lawrence; 13 Zach Zidian	Linebackers: 2 Beau Bell; 94 Tyre Glasper; 18 Joe Goosby; Defensive backs: 22 Dwayne Hollis; 20 Bryce Peila; 4 Kent Richardson; 25 James Romain; Kicker: 12 Adrian Trevino	Injured reserve: 10 Robert Brown DB (IR); 98 Ted Jennings DL (IR); 17 Poppy Livers WR (IR); 19 Ryan McDaniel WR (IR); 11 John Sheehy DL (IR); 23 LaRico Stevenson DB (IR); 77 Neal Tivis OL (IR); Refused to report: -- Tevin Hood DL (DNR); -- Andrew Robustelli WR (DNR); League suspension: 76 Adam Smith OL (Susp.); Other league exempt: -- John Kling OL (Exempt); 8 Jake Metz DL (Exempt); Inactive reserve: 24 Torez Jones DB; Recallable reassignment: currently vacant; rookies in italics Roster updated August 24, 2017; 24 Active, 13 Inactive

== Schedule ==
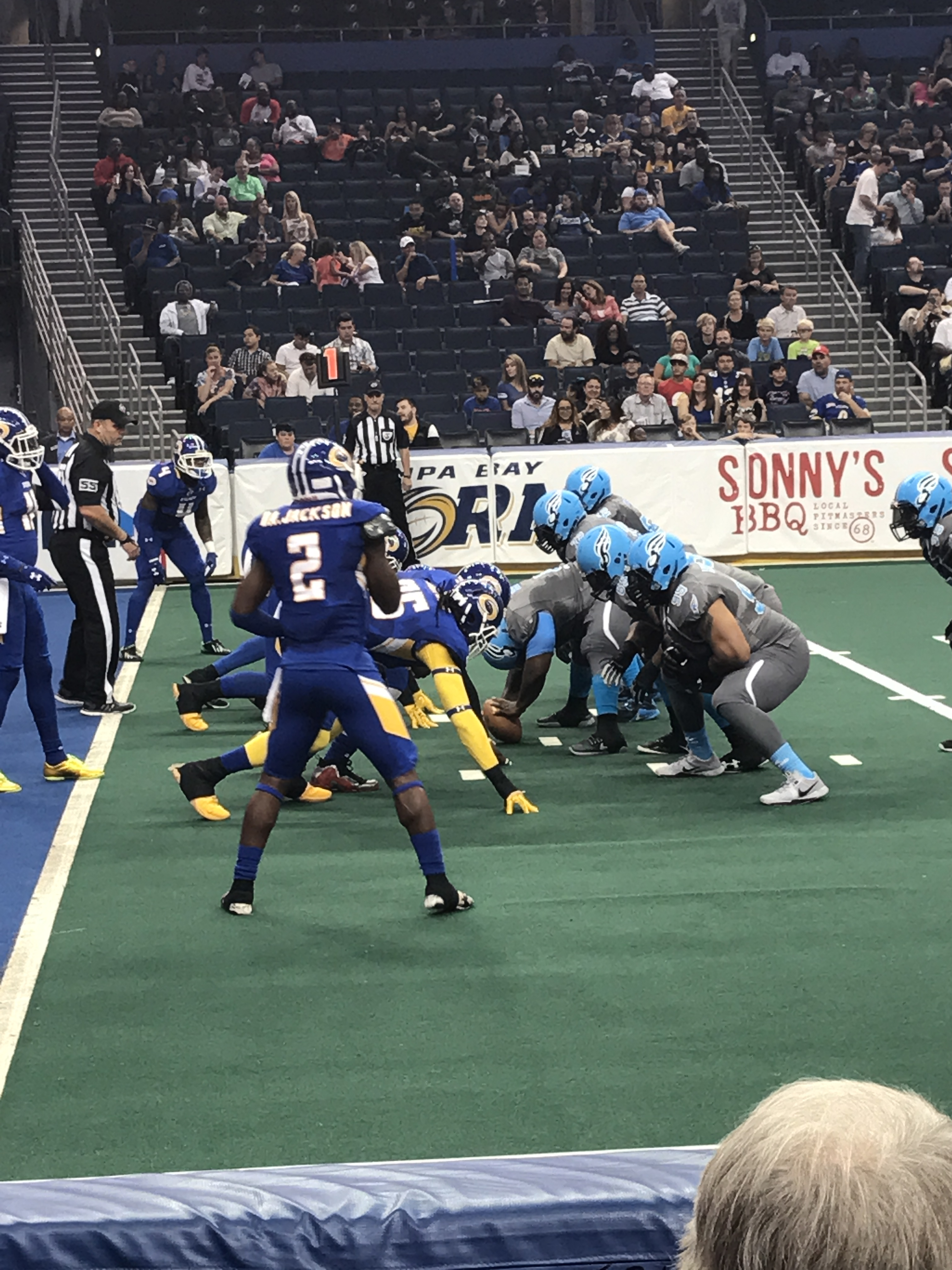
The Soul playing the Tampa Bay Storm on April 15

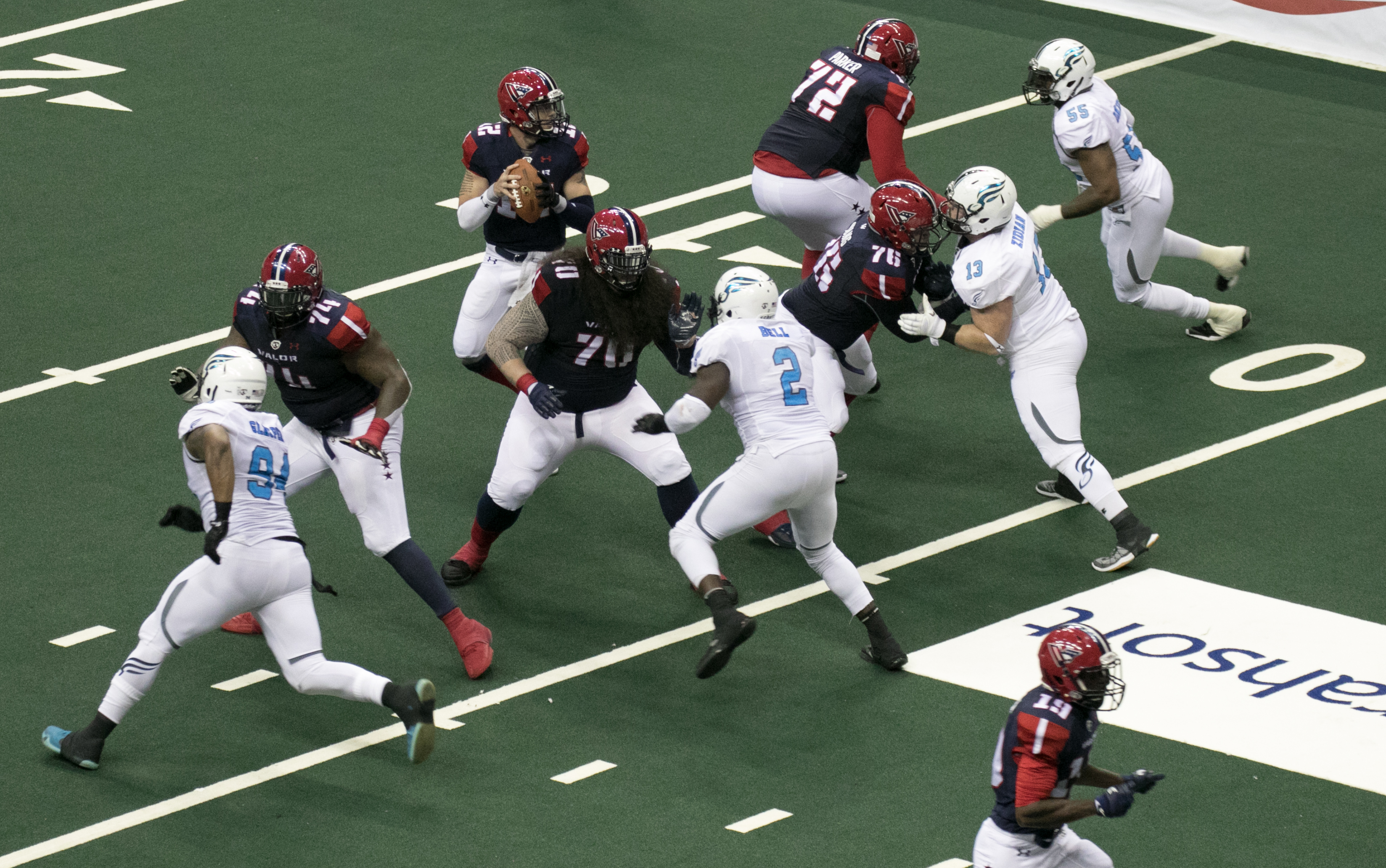
The Soul playing the Washington Valor on May 27

=== Regular season ===
The 2017 regular season schedule was released on January 5, 2017.

Week	Day	Date	Kickoff	Opponent	Results		Location	Attendance	Report
Week	Day	Date	Kickoff	Opponent	Score	Record	Location	Attendance	Report
1	Bye								
2	Saturday	April 15	7:00 PM EDT	at Tampa Bay Storm	W 56–52	1–0	Amalie Arena	9,071	
3	Saturday	April 22	7:00 PM EDT	at Washington Valor	W 49–31	2–0	Verizon Center	12,122	
4	Saturday	April 29	7:00 PM EDT	Baltimore Brigade	W 69–34	3–0	Wells Fargo Center	11,833	
5	Saturday	May 6	7:00 PM EDT	at Cleveland Gladiators	W 69–67	4–0	Quicken Loans Arena	10,389	
6	Saturday	May 13	7:00 PM EDT	Baltimore Brigade	W 61–56	5–0	Wells Fargo Center	9,857	
7	Saturday	May 20	7:00 PM EDT	Cleveland Gladiators	W 64–46	6–0	Wells Fargo Center	7,667	
8	Saturday	May 27	1:00 PM EDT	at Washington Valor	W 48–47	7–0	Verizon Center	9,873	
9	Bye								
10	Saturday	June 10	7:00 PM EDT	Cleveland Gladiators	W 59–49	8–0	Wells Fargo Center	10,103	
11	Saturday	June 17	7:00 PM EDT	Tampa Bay Storm	W 62–41	9–0	Wells Fargo Center	9,081	
12	Saturday	June 24	7:00 PM EDT	at Cleveland Gladiators	W 59–28	10–0	Quicken Loans Arena	10,580	
13	Bye								
14	Saturday	July 8	7:00 PM EDT	at Baltimore Brigade	L 42–49	10–1	Royal Farms Arena	5,990	
15	Saturday	July 15	7:00 PM EDT	Washington Valor	W 68–41	11–1	Wells Fargo Center	10,149	
16	Bye								
17	Saturday	July 29	1:00 PM EDT	at Baltimore Brigade	W 70–21	12–1	Royal Farms Arena	5,327	
18	Saturday	August 5	7:00 PM EDT	Tampa Bay Storm	W 41–28	13–1	Wells Fargo Center	9,071	

=== Playoffs ===
Round	Day	Date	Kickoff	Opponent	Results	Location	Attendance	Report
AFL Semifinals	Saturday	August 12	4:00 PM EDT	Baltimore Brigade	W 69–54	Wells Fargo Center	9,287	
ArenaBowl XXX	Saturday	August 26	7:00 PM EDT	Tampa Bay Storm	W 44–40	Wells Fargo Center	13,648	

== Standings ==
2017 Arena Football League standings
Team	Overall			Points		Records			
Team	W	L	PCT	PF	PA	Home	Away	GB	STK
^{(1)}Philadelphia Soul	13	1	.929	817	590	7–0	6–1	—	W3
^{(2)}Tampa Bay Storm	10	4	.714	710	662	6–1	4–3	3.0	L1
^{(3)}Cleveland Gladiators	5	9	.357	696	715	3–4	2–5	8.0	W1
^{(4)}Baltimore Brigade	4	10	.286	620	749	3–4	1–6	9.0	L4
Washington Valor	3	11	.214	565	692	2–5	1–6	10.0	W1

^{(#)} - playoff position secured
