= 2017 Tampa Bay Storm season =

Arena Football League team season

- Owner: Jeffrey Vinik
- Head coach: Ron James
- Home stadium: Amalie Arena

Results
- Record: 10–4
- League place: 2nd
- Playoffs: Won Semifinals 73–59 (Gladiators); Lost ArenaBowl XXX 40–44 (Soul)

The 2017 Tampa Bay Storm season was the 30th and final season for the franchise in the Arena Football League, and their 26th while in Tampa Bay. The Storm played at Amalie Arena.

== Staff ==
2017 Tampa Bay Storm staff
Front office: Owner/Chairman – Jeffrey Vinik; President – Derrick Brooks; Chief operating officer – Steve Griggs; AFL board member – Elmer Straub	Coaches: Head coach – Ron James; Assistant head coach - Doug Kay; Defensive coordinator – Doug Kay; Offensive coordinator – Shane Stafford; Defensive line/linebackers – Austin Wilson; Special teams coach – Gary Gussman

== Roster ==
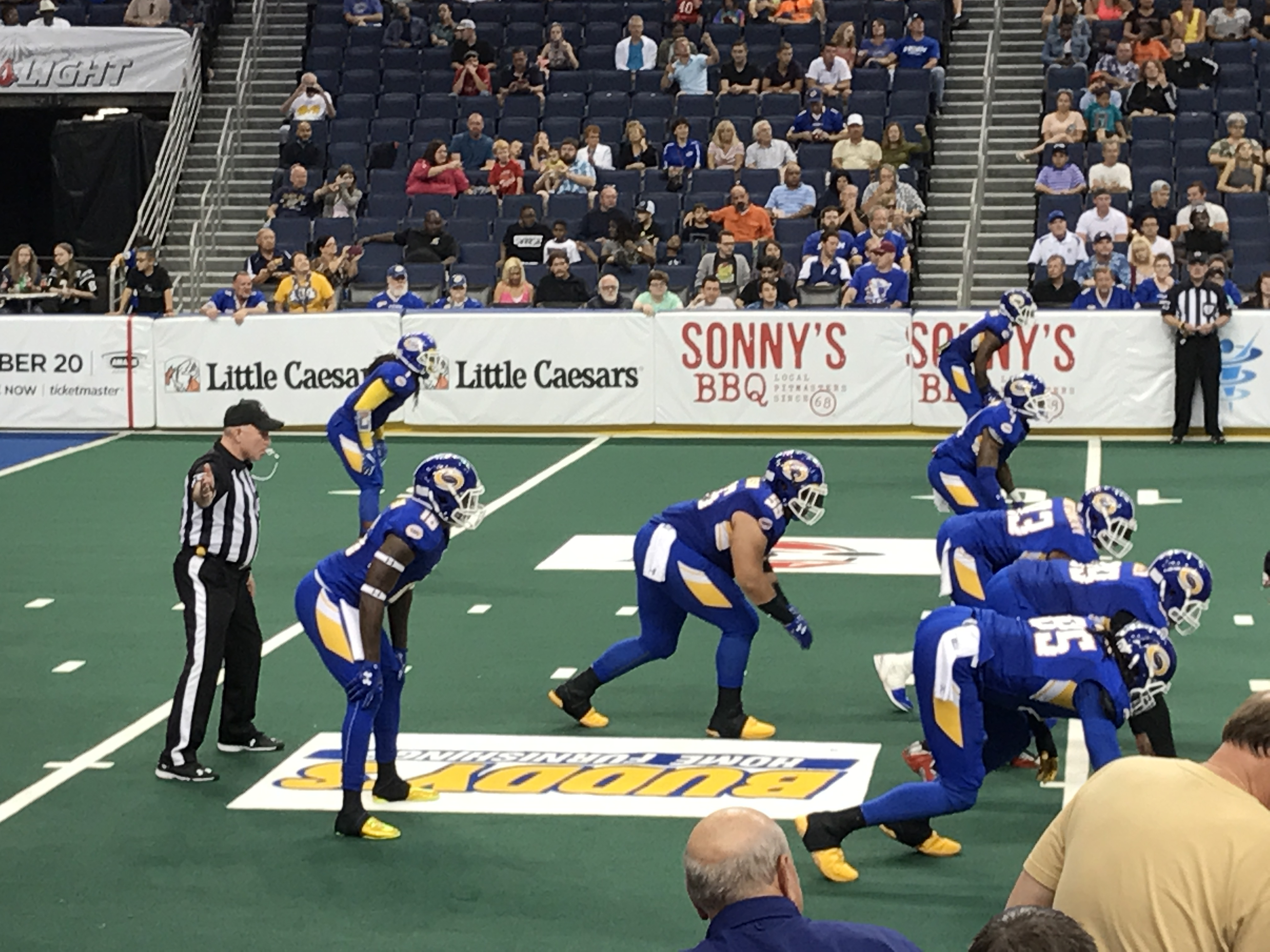
The Storm on April 15

2017 Tampa Bay Storm roster
Quarterbacks: 8 Chris Bonner; 12 Randy Hippeard; Fullbacks: currently vacant; Wide receivers: 11 LaMark Brown; 81 Joe Hills; 15 Justin Hilton; 17 Kendrick Ings; 10 Michael Lindsey	Offensive linemen: 72 Leonardo Bates; 68 Ryan Cave; 66 Cornelius Lewis; 50 Raymond McNeil; 60 Jeremiah Warren; Defensive linemen: 91 Antron Dillon; 90 Monte Lewis; 99 Jordan Miller; 93 Kendall Montgomery; 42 Meshak Williams	Linebackers: 16 Alvin Ray Jackson; 55 Dexter Jackson; Defensive backs: 3 Allen Chapman; 4 Arthur Hobbs; 9 LaRoche Jackson; 14 Al Phillips; Kickers: 18 Mark Lewis	Injured reserve: -- Xavier Boyce WR (IR); 21 Jabari Gorman DB (IR); -- Rick-J Hill DB (IR); -- Byron Isom OL (IR); 2 Dallas Jackson DB (IR); 49 Max Nacewicz DL (IR); -- Ben Ossai OL (IR); 55 Dominie Pittman DL (IR); 85 Caesar Rayford DL (IR); 1 Cortez Stubbs DB (IR); -- Isaiah Tuiasosopo OL (IR); Inactive reserve: currently vacant; League suspension: 26 Emanuel Cook DB (Susp.); -- Devonte Danzey OL (Susp.); -- Cornelius Dixon OL (Susp.); -- Justin Edison DL (Susp.); -- Adam Kennedy QB (Susp.); 5 Greg Reid DB (Susp.); 26 Anthony Shutt DB (Susp.); Other league exempt: currently vacant; Inactive reserve: currently vacant; Refuse to report: 69 Miles Mason OL (DNR); -- Jesse Somsel OL (DNR); Recallable reassignment: 3 Paul Stephens DB; Rookies in itlatics Roster updated August 14, 2017; 24 Active, 21 Inactive

== Schedule ==
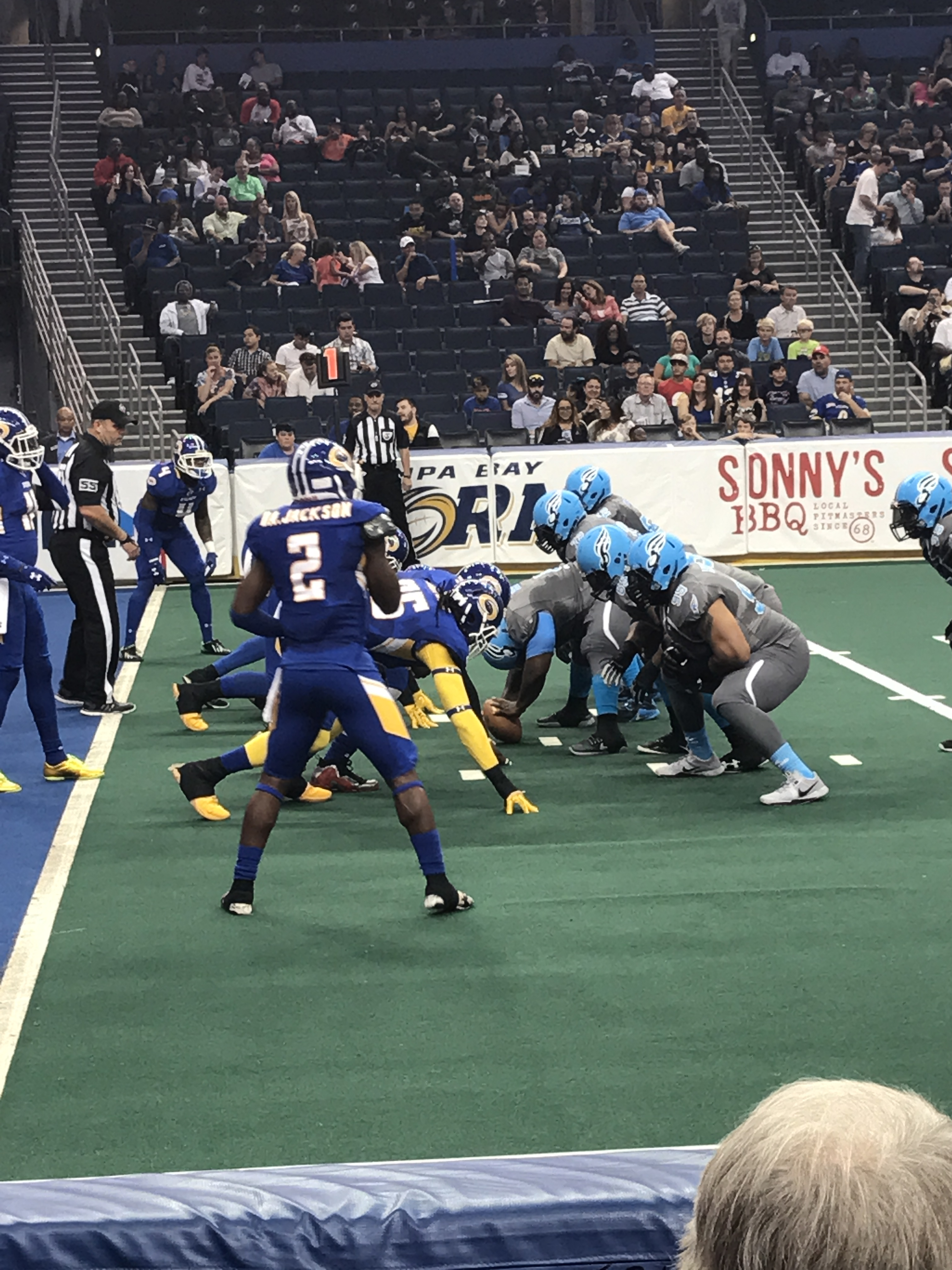
The Storm playing the Philadelphia Soul on April 15

=== Regular season ===
The 2017 regular season schedule was released on January 5, 2017.

Week	Day	Date	Kickoff	Opponent	Results		Location	Attendance	Report
Week	Day	Date	Kickoff	Opponent	Score	Record	Location	Attendance	Report
1	Saturday	April 8	7:00 PM EDT	at Cleveland Gladiators	W 46–40	1–0	Quicken Loans Arena	12,865	
2	Saturday	April 15	7:00 PM EDT	Philadelphia Soul	L 52–56	1–1	Amalie Arena	9,071	
3	Saturday	April 22	7:00 PM EDT	Cleveland Gladiators	W 62–61	2–1	Amalie Arena	9,119	
4	Bye								
5	Sunday	May 7	1:00 PM EDT	at Baltimore Brigade	W 62–55	3–1	Royal Farms Arena	5,915	
6	Saturday	May 13	7:00 PM EDT	at Washington Valor	W 41–33	4–1	Verizon Center	8,420	
7	Saturday	May 20	7:00 PM EDT	Washington Valor	W 53–47	5–1	Amalie Arena	9,275	
8	Bye								
9	Saturday	June 3	7:00 PM EDT	Baltimore Brigade	W 47–35	6–1	Amalie Arena	9,880	
10	Saturday	June 10	7:00 PM EDT	Washington Valor	W 58–57	7–1	Amalie Arena	9,856	
11	Saturday	June 17	7:00 PM EDT	at Philadelphia Soul	L 41–62	7–2	Wells Fargo Center	9,081	
12	Bye								
13	Saturday	July 1	7:00 PM EDT	Washington Valor	W 55–51	8–2	Amalie Arena	9,913	
14	Saturday	July 8	7:00 PM EDT	at Cleveland Gladiators	L 39–41	8–3	Quicken Loans Arena	11,525	
15	Saturday	July 15	7:00 PM EDT	at Baltimore Brigade	W 69–56	9–3	Royal Farms Arena	5,153	
16	Saturday	July 22	7:00 PM EDT	Cleveland Gladiators	W 57–27	10–3	Amalie Arena	10,567	
17	Bye								
18	Saturday	August 5	7:00 PM EDT	at Philadelphia Soul	L 28–41	10–4	Wells Fargo Center	9,071	

=== Playoffs ===
Round	Day	Date	Kickoff	Opponent	Results	Location	Attendance	Report
AFL Semifinals	Monday	August 14	7:00 PM EDT	Cleveland Gladiators	W 73–59	Amalie Arena	9,621	
ArenaBowl XXX	Saturday	August 26	7:00 PM EDT	at Philadelphia Soul	L 40–44	Wells Fargo Center	13,648	

== Standings ==
2017 Arena Football League standings
Team	Overall			Points		Records			
Team	W	L	PCT	PF	PA	Home	Away	GB	STK
^{(1)}Philadelphia Soul	13	1	.929	817	590	7–0	6–1	—	W3
^{(2)}Tampa Bay Storm	10	4	.714	710	662	6–1	4–3	3.0	L1
^{(3)}Cleveland Gladiators	5	9	.357	696	715	3–4	2–5	8.0	W1
^{(4)}Baltimore Brigade	4	10	.286	620	749	3–4	1–6	9.0	L4
Washington Valor	3	11	.214	565	692	2–5	1–6	10.0	W1

^{(#)} - playoff position secured
