= 2017 Cleveland Gladiators season =

Arena Football League team season

- Owner: Dan Gilbert
- Head coach: Ron Selesky
- Home stadium: Quicken Loans Arena

Results
- Record: 5–9
- League place: 3rd
- Playoffs: Lost Semifinals 59–73 (Storm)

The 2017 Cleveland Gladiators season was the 18th season for the franchise in the Arena Football League, and their eighth in Cleveland. The Gladiators played at the Quicken Loans Arena. The Gladiators drew an average home attendance of 10,173 in the 2017 AFL season.

== Staff ==
2017 Cleveland Gladiators staff
Front office: Dan Gilbert (Majority Owner); Len Komoroski (CEO); Kerry Bubolz (President of business operations); Mike Ostrowski (VP of Minor League Operations); Dominic Jones (director of football operations); Chad Schofield (Football Outreach and Community Ambassador)	Head coach: Ron Selesky; Assistant coaches: Dominic Jones (assistant head coach); Chad Schofield (offensive coordinator / offensive line coach); Clay Harrell (defensive line coach / strength and conditioning coach)

== Roster ==
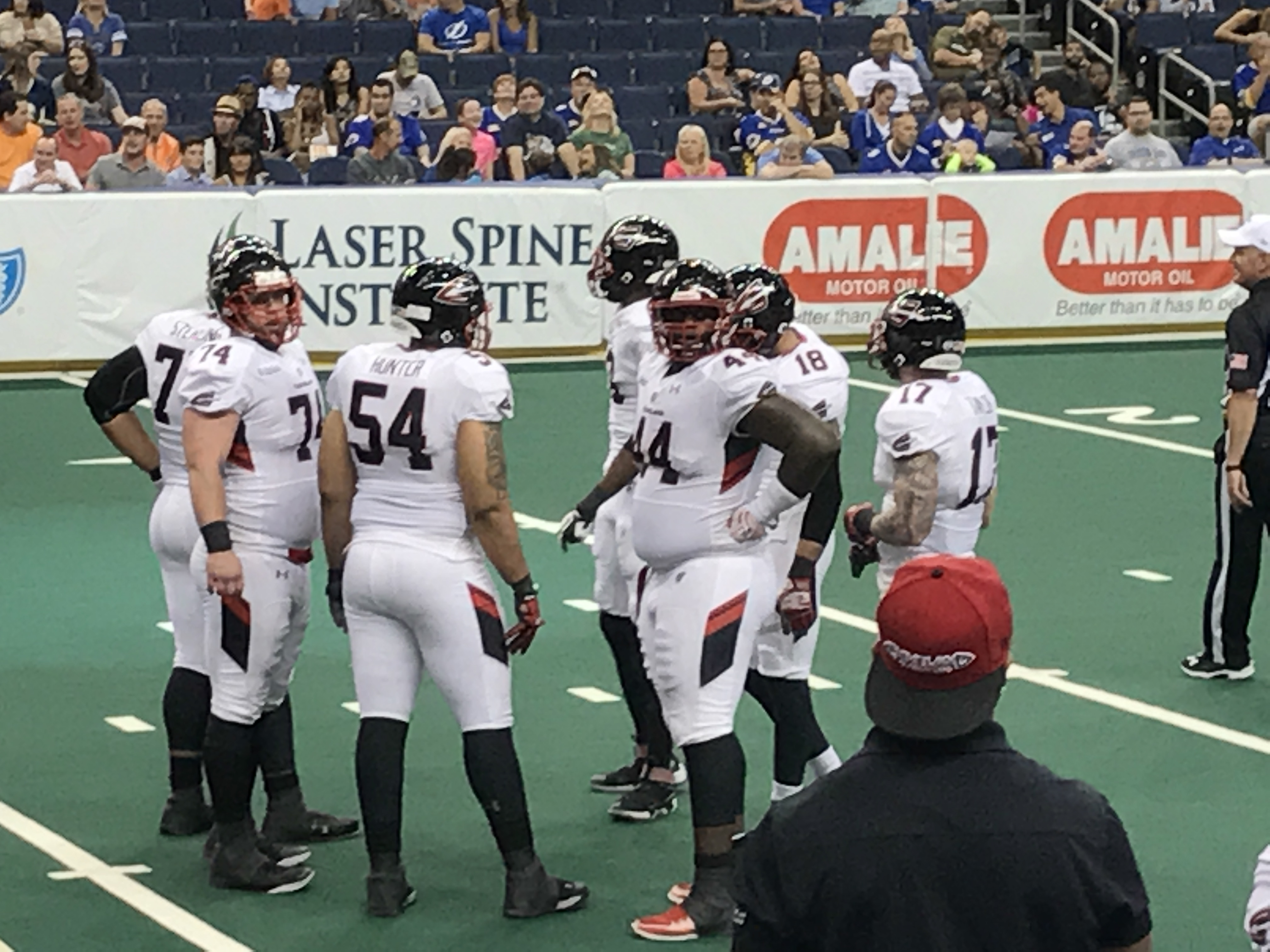
The Gladiators on April 22

2017 Cleveland Gladiators roster
Quarterbacks: 12 Tanner Marsh; 2 Arvell Nelson; Fullbacks: 33 Jeramie Richardson; Wide receivers: 6 Tom Gilson; 10 Lonnie Outlaw; 19 Michael Preston; 18 Quentin Sims; 17 Collin Taylor	Offensive linemen: 55 Adam Bice; 51 Alex Land; 74 Bret Piekarski; 77 Aslam Sterling; Defensive linemen: 3 Darryl Cato-Bishop; 56 Willie McGinnis; 9 K. C. Obi; 99 Nick Seither; 50 Derrick Summers	Linebackers: 8 Terence Moore; Defensive backs: 21 Marrio Norman; 5 Fred Obi; 4 Brandon Stephens; 20 Kenny Veal; Kickers: 23 Drew Basil	Injured reserve: 11 Phillip Barnett WR (IR); 1 Larry Brackins WR (IR); 92 Zach Colvin DL (IR); 11 Jamar Howard WR (IR); 63 Jordan McCray OL (IR); 13 Devin Wilson WR (IR); Other league exempt: Currently vacant; League suspension: -- D. J. Brandel OL (Susp.); -- Michael Carlisle LB (Susp.); 78 David Griffin OL (Susp.); 15 Jujuan Harley DB (Susp.); 15 Stephen Panasuk QB (Susp.); 21 Troy Pascley WR (Susp.); 14 Aaron Pettrey K (Susp.); 4 Marvin Ross DB (Susp.); 13 Danny Southwick QB (Susp.); 11 Antonio Vaughan WR (Susp.); 10 Josiah Yazdani K (Susp.); Inactive reserve: Currently vacant; Refuse to report: -- John Collins OL (DNR); Recallable reassignment: Currently vacant; Rookies in italics Roster updated August 14, 2017; 23 Active, 18 Inactive

== Schedule ==
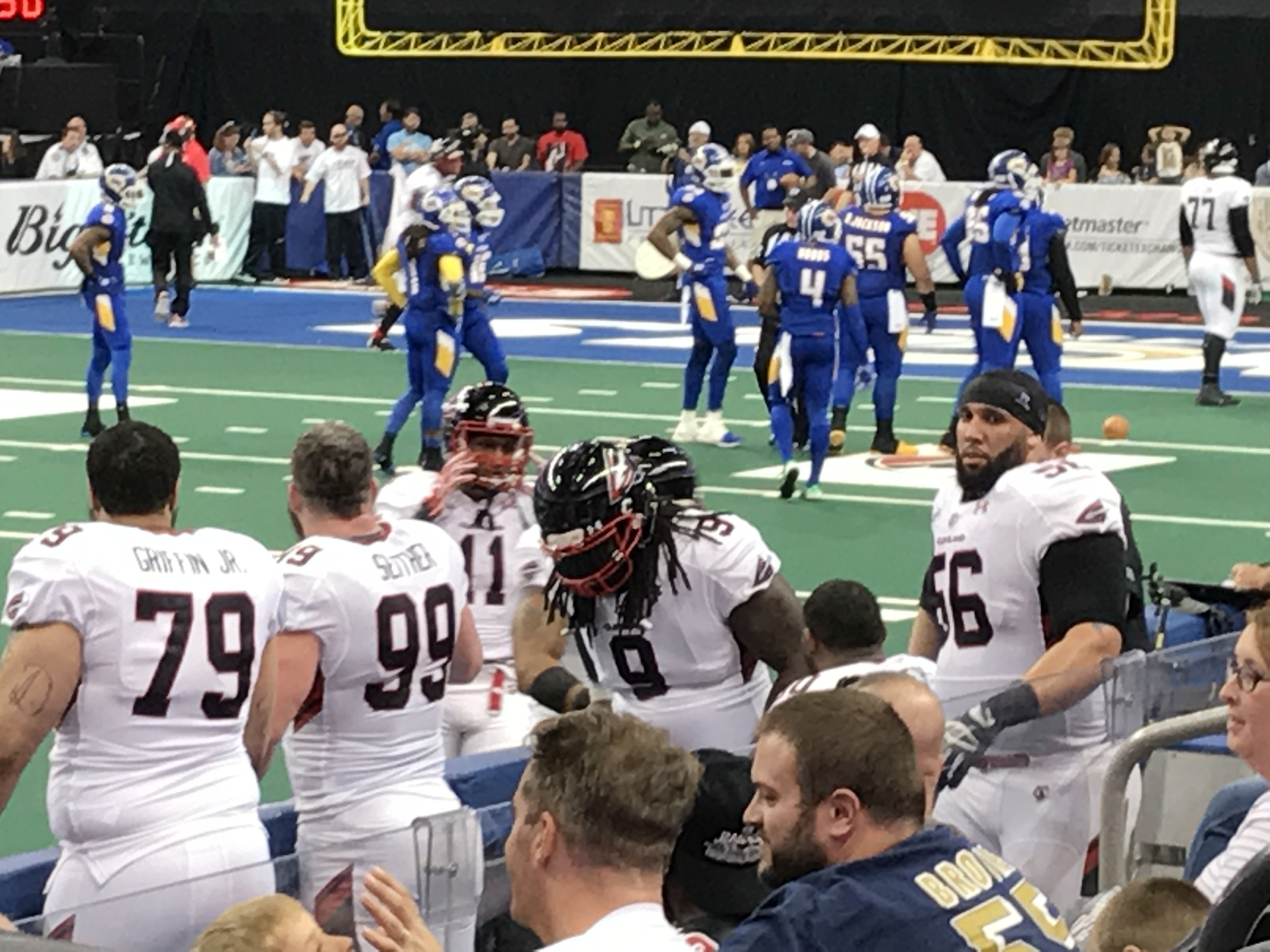
The Gladiators playing the Tampa Bay Storm on April 22

=== Regular season ===
The 2017 regular season schedule was released on January 5, 2017.

Week	Day	Date	Kickoff	Opponent	Results		Location	Attendance	Report
Week	Day	Date	Kickoff	Opponent	Score	Record	Location	Attendance	Report
1	Saturday	April 8	7:00 PM EDT	Tampa Bay Storm	L 40–46	0–1	Quicken Loans Arena	12,865	
2	Sunday	April 16	3:00 PM EDT	Baltimore Brigade	L 49–52	0–2	Quicken Loans Arena	5,758	
3	Saturday	April 22	7:00 PM EDT	at Tampa Bay Storm	L 61–62	0–3	Amalie Arena	9,119	
4	Friday	April 28	7:00 PM EDT	Washington Valor	W 48–34	1–3	Quicken Loans Arena	9,223	
5	Saturday	May 6	7:00 PM EDT	Philadelphia Soul	L 67–69	1–4	Quicken Loans Arena	10,389	
6	Bye								
7	Saturday	May 20	7:00 PM EDT	at Philadelphia Soul	L 46–64	1–5	Wells Fargo Center	7,667	
8	Saturday	May 27	7:00 PM EDT	at Baltimore Brigade	L 60–63	1–6	Royal Farms Arena	5,190	
9	Saturday	June 3	7:00 PM EDT	at Washington Valor	W 59–35	2–6	Verizon Center	9,901	
10	Saturday	June 10	7:00 PM EDT	at Philadelphia Soul	L 49–59	2–7	Wells Fargo Center	10,103	
11	Friday	June 16	7:00 PM EDT	Baltimore Brigade	W 59–48	3–7	Quicken Loans Arena	10,877	
12	Saturday	June 24	7:00 PM EDT	Philadelphia Soul	L 28–59	3–8	Quicken Loans Arena	10,580	
13	Bye								
14	Saturday	July 8	7:00 PM EDT	Tampa Bay Storm	W 41–39	4–8	Quicken Loans Arena	11,525	
15	Bye								
16	Saturday	July 22	7:00 PM EDT	at Tampa Bay Storm	L 27–57	4–9	Amalie Arena	10,567	
17	Saturday	July 29	7:00 PM EDT	at Washington Valor	W 62–28	5–9	Verizon Center	11,127	
18	Bye								

=== Playoffs ===
Round	Day	Date	Kickoff	Opponent	Results	Location	Attendance	Report
AFL Semifinals	Monday	August 14	7:00 PM EDT	at Tampa Bay Storm	L 59–73	Amalie Arena	9,621	

== Standings ==
2017 Arena Football League standings
Team	Overall			Points		Records			
Team	W	L	PCT	PF	PA	Home	Away	GB	STK
^{(1)}Philadelphia Soul	13	1	.929	817	590	7–0	6–1	—	W3
^{(2)}Tampa Bay Storm	10	4	.714	710	662	6–1	4–3	3.0	L1
^{(3)}Cleveland Gladiators	5	9	.357	696	715	3–4	2–5	8.0	W1
^{(4)}Baltimore Brigade	4	10	.286	620	749	3–4	1–6	9.0	L4
Washington Valor	3	11	.214	565	692	2–5	1–6	10.0	W1

^{(#)} - playoff position secured
