= 2017 Baltimore Brigade season =

Arena Football League team season

- Owner: Monumental Sports & Entertainment
- Head coach: Omarr Smith
- Home stadium: Royal Farms Arena

Results
- Record: 4–10
- League place: 4th
- Playoffs: Lost Semifinals 54–69 (Soul)

The 2017 Baltimore Brigade season was the first season for the franchise in the Arena Football League. The Brigade played at the Royal Farms Arena.

== Staff ==
2017 Baltimore Brigade staff
Front office: Chairman – Ted Leonsis	Coaches: Head coach – Omarr Smith; Defensive coordinator/assistant head coach – Walt Housman; Defensive backs/special teams coordinator – Virgil Gray; Assistant – James Roe; Assistant – Scott Bailey

== Roster ==
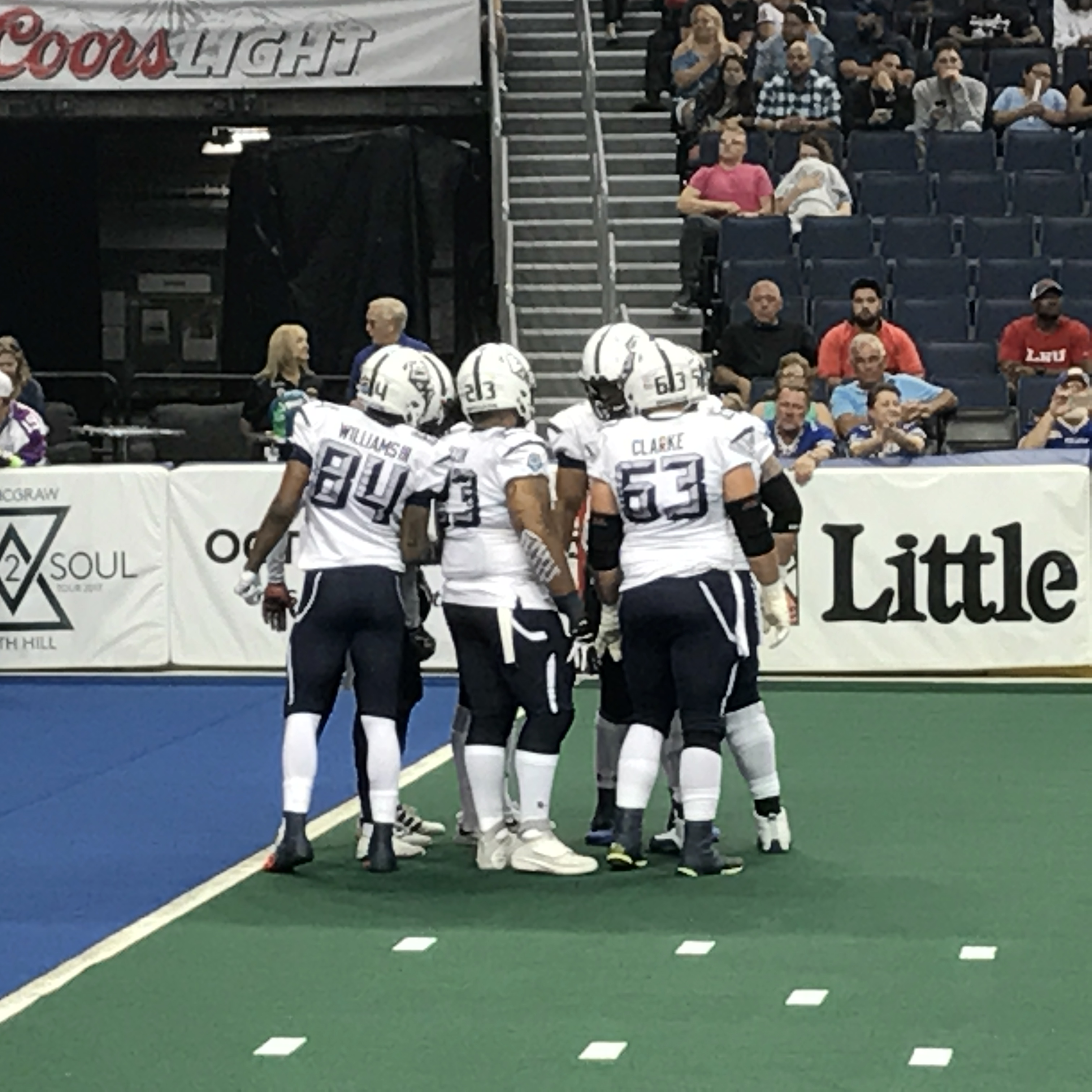
The Brigade on June 3

2017 Baltimore Brigade roster
Quarterbacks: 8 Shane Boyd; 9 J. J. Raterink; Fullbacks: 23 Rory Nixon; Wide receivers: 19 Paul Browning; 17 Brandon Collins; 1 Reggie Gray; 14 Brandon Thompkins; 84 Milton Williams	Offensive linemen: 55 Kody Afusia; 63 Ben Clarke; 77 Ian Joseph; 70 Colin Madison; 74 Antoine McClain; Defensive linemen: 92 Calvin Fance; 99 Robert Hayes; 40 Anthony McDaniel; 58 Khreem Smith; 67 Terrance Taylor	Linebackers: 2 Dexter Davis Jr.; Defensive backs: 5 Qumain Black; 11 Arkeith Brown; 4 K. J. Morton; 10 Varmah Sonie; 7 Josh Victorian; Kickers: 45 Patrick Clarke	Injured reserve: 6 Shane Carden QB (IR); -- Quinton Pointer DB (IR); 81 Julian Talley WR (IR); -- Lavasier Tuinei WR (IR); 4 LaQuan Williams WR (IR); 3 Trey Wolfe DB (IR); Other league exempt: -- Alfonzo Dennard DB (Exempt); -- Travis Hawkins DB (Exempt); League suspension: 9 Chase Cartwright QB (Susp.); 74 Jace Daniels OL (Susp.); -- Marcus Harris WR (Susp.); Refused to report: -- Tayo Fabuluje OL (DNR); -- Collin Keoshian DL (DNR); Inactive reserve: 56 Derrell Johnson LB; Recallable reassignment: currently vacant; rookies in italics Roster updated August 3, 2017; 25 Active, 14 Inactive

== Schedule ==
=== Regular season ===
The 2017 regular season schedule was released on January 5, 2017.

Week	Day	Date	Kickoff	Opponent	Results		Location	Attendance	Report
Week	Day	Date	Kickoff	Opponent	Score	Record	Location	Attendance	Report
1	Friday	April 7	7:00 PM EDT	at Washington Valor	L 38–51	0–1	Verizon Center	15,579	
2	Sunday	April 16	3:00 PM EDT	at Cleveland Gladiators	W 52–49	1–1	Quicken Loans Arena	5,758	
3	Bye								
4	Saturday	April 29	7:00 PM EDT	at Philadelphia Soul	L 34–69	1–2	Wells Fargo Center	11,833	
5	Sunday	May 7	1:00 PM EDT	Tampa Bay Storm	L 55–62	1–3	Royal Farms Arena	5,915	
6	Saturday	May 13	7:00 PM EDT	at Philadelphia Soul	L 56–61	1–4	Wells Fargo Center	9,857	
7	Bye								
8	Saturday	May 27	7:00 PM EDT	Cleveland Gladiators	W 63–60	2–4	Royal Farms Arena	5,190	
9	Saturday	June 3	7:00 PM EDT	at Tampa Bay Storm	L 35–47	2–5	Amalie Arena	9,880	
10	Bye								
11	Friday	June 16	7:00 PM EDT	at Cleveland Gladiators	L 48–59	2–6	Quicken Loans Arena	10,877	
12	Friday	June 23	7:00 PM EDT	Washington Valor	W 51–41	3–6	Royal Farms Arena	6,095	
13	Bye								
14	Saturday	July 8	7:00 PM EDT	Philadelphia Soul	W 49–42	4–6	Royal Farms Arena	5,990	
15	Saturday	July 15	7:00 PM EDT	Tampa Bay Storm	L 56–69	4–7	Royal Farms Arena	5,153	
16	Saturday	July 22	7:00 PM EDT	at Washington Valor	L 30–34	4–8	Verizon Center	10,266	
17	Saturday	July 29	1:00 PM EDT	Philadelphia Soul	L 21–70	4–9	Royal Farms Arena	5,327	
18	Friday	August 4	7:00 PM EDT	Washington Valor	L 35–41	4–10	Royal Farms Arena	6,089	

=== Playoffs ===
Round	Day	Date	Kickoff	Opponent	Results	Location	Attendance	Report
AFL Semifinals	Saturday	August 12	4:00 PM EDT	at Philadelphia Soul	L 54–69	Wells Fargo Center	9,287	

== Standings ==
2017 Arena Football League standings
Team	Overall			Points		Records			
Team	W	L	PCT	PF	PA	Home	Away	GB	STK
^{(1)}Philadelphia Soul	13	1	.929	817	590	7–0	6–1	—	W3
^{(2)}Tampa Bay Storm	10	4	.714	710	662	6–1	4–3	3.0	L1
^{(3)}Cleveland Gladiators	5	9	.357	696	715	3–4	2–5	8.0	W1
^{(4)}Baltimore Brigade	4	10	.286	620	749	3–4	1–6	9.0	L4
Washington Valor	3	11	.214	565	692	2–5	1–6	10.0	W1

^{(#)} - playoff position secured
