= Joe Goosby =

American football player (born 1986)

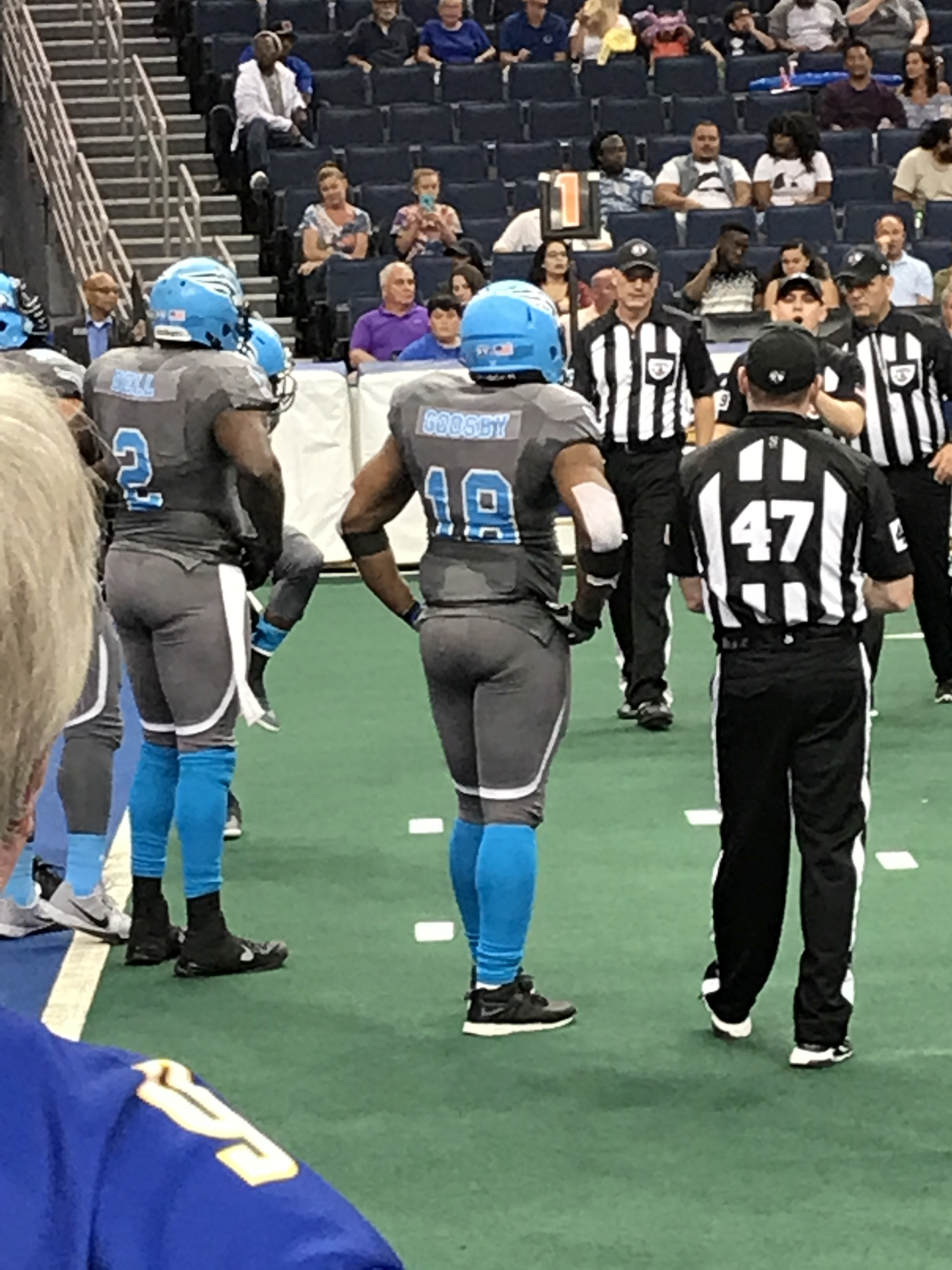
- Goosby (#18) with the Philadelphia Soul in 2017

No. 18
- Position: Linebacker

Personal information
- Born: September 6, 1986 (age 40); Jersey Village, Texas, U.S.
- Listed height: 6 ft 1 in (1.85 m)
- Listed weight: 230 lb (104 kg)

Career information
- High school: Jersey (TX) Village
- College: Tulane
- NFL draft: 2008: undrafted

Career history
- Bossier-Shreveport Battle Wings (2009); San Angelo Stampede Express (2010); Dallas Vigilantes (2011); Philadelphia Soul (2012–2016); Baltimore Brigade (2017)*; Philadelphia Soul (2017–2018); Baltimore Brigade (2019)
- * Offseason or practice squad member only

Awards and highlights
- 2× ArenaBowl champion (2016, 2017); First-team All-Arena (2016); 2× Second-team All-Arena (2017, 2018)

Career AFL statistics
- Tackles: 533
- Sacks: 5
- Forced fumbles: 19
- Fumble recoveries: 13
- Interceptions: 18
- Stats at ArenaFan.com

Joseph Goosby, Jr. (born September 6, 1986) is an American former professional football linebacker who played in the Arena Football League (AFL). He played college football for the Tulane Green Wave.

== Professional career ==
In 2009, Goosby was a member of the Bossier-Shreveport Battle Wings of the af2. In 2010, he played for the San Angelo Stampede Express of the Indoor Football League. In 2011, he was signed by the Dallas Vigilantes of the Arena Football League (AFL). On September 28, 2011, he was signed by the AFL's Philadelphia Soul. He was named Riddell Co-Defensive Player of the Week after his performance against the Georgia Force winning 92-42. On August 26, 2016, the Soul beat the Arizona Rattlers in ArenaBowl XXIX by a score of 56–42.

On January 31, 2017, Goosby was selected by the Baltimore Brigade in the 2017 AFL expansion draft. On February 23, 2017, the Brigade traded Goosby to the Soul for future considerations and claim order positioning. He earned second-team All-Arena honors in 2017. On August 26, 2017, the Soul beat the Tampa Bay Storm in ArenaBowl XXX by a score of 44–40.

== Personal life ==
Son of Sharon and Joe. Graduated from Tulane with a degree in Media Arts.
