= Bryce Peila =

American football player (born 1990)

No. 20
- Position: Linebacker

Personal information
- Born: May 8, 1990 (age 36); Medford, Oregon, U.S.
- Listed height: 6 ft 1 in (1.85 m)
- Listed weight: 205 lb (93 kg)

Career information
- High school: Central Point (OR) Crater
- College: Western Oregon
- NFL draft: 2013: undrafted

Career history
- Portland Thunder/Steel (2014–2016); Washington Valor (2017)*; Philadelphia Soul (2017–2018)
- * Offseason or practice squad member only

Awards and highlights
- ArenaBowl champion (2017); Second-team All-Arena (2014); AFL Top 50 Player (#37)

Career AFL statistics
- Tackles: 157.5
- Pass breakups: 18
- Forced fumbles: 2
- Fumble recoveries: 8
- Interceptions: 12
- Stats at ArenaFan.com

Bryce Peila (born May 8, 1990) is an American former professional football linebacker. After graduating in 2008 from Crater High School in Central Point, Oregon he attended Western Oregon University and played for the school's football team for four years (2009–12). Peila is second all-time in the Great Northwest Athletic Conference in career interceptions with 20. He also holds the record for return yards with 437 . After his college career was over, Peila kept in football condition while working outside the sport. In 2014, he worked out for Portland Thunder head coach Matthew Sauk and was subsequently signed to one-year contract to play for the team during their inaugural season. According to the AFL, he stands at 6 feet 1 inch (1.85 m) and weighs 205 pounds (93 kg). On March 10, 2017, Peila was assigned to the Washington Valor. On April 5, 2017, Peila was placed on recallable reassignment. On May 2, 2017, Peila was assigned to the Philadelphia Soul. On August 26, 2017, the Soul beat the Tampa Bay Storm in ArenaBowl XXX by a score of 44–40.
