= Darius Reynolds =

American football player (born 1989)

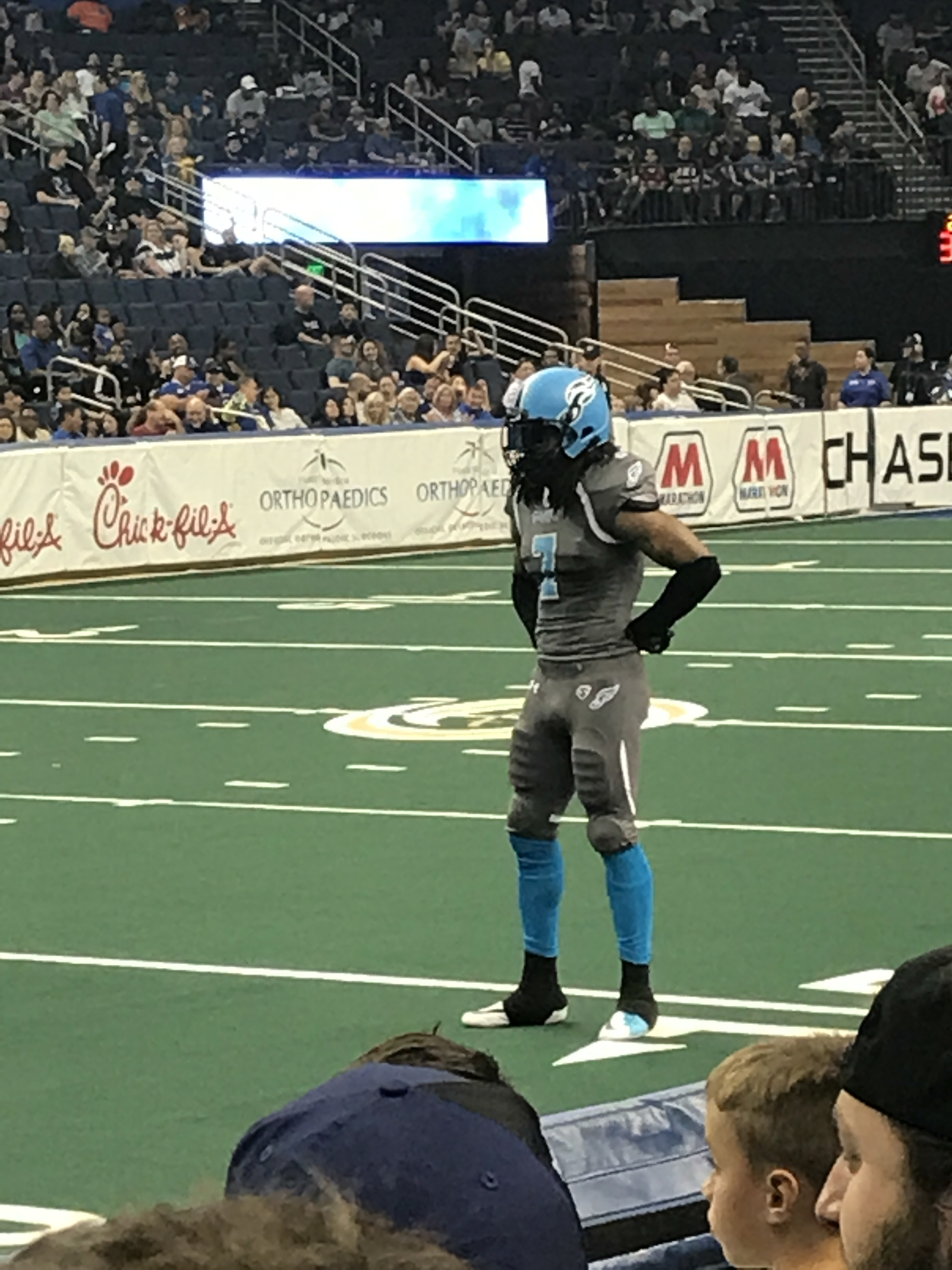
- Reynolds with the Philadelphia Soul in 2017

No. 7
- Position: Wide receiver

Personal information
- Born: April 4, 1989 (age 37)
- Listed height: 6 ft 2 in (1.88 m)
- Listed weight: 205 lb (93 kg)

Career information
- High school: C.D. Hylton (Woodbridge, Virginia)
- College: Reedley (2007–2008); Iowa State (2009–2011)
- NFL draft: 2012: undrafted

Career history
- Green Bay Packers (2012)*; Iowa Barnstormers (2012–2014); San Jose SaberCats (2015); Philadelphia Soul (2016–2019); Guangzhou Power (2018–2019)
- * Offseason or practice squad member only

Awards and highlights
- 3× ArenaBowl champion (2015–2017); First-team All-Arena (2017); Second-team All-Arena (2014)

Career AFL statistics
- Receptions: 480
- Receiving yards: 6,651
- Receiving TDs: 153
- Total TDs: 172
- Tackles: 75
- Stats at ArenaFan.com

Darius Reynolds (born April 4, 1989) is an American former professional football wide receiver who played in the Arena Football League (AFL) for the Iowa Barnstormers, San Jose SaberCats, and Philadelphia Soul. He played college football at Reedley College and Iowa State University. Reynolds was also a member of the Green Bay Packers of the National Football League (NFL) and the Guangzhou Power of the China Arena Football League (CAFL).

== Early life ==
Reynolds lettered in football, basketball, and track and field at C.D. Hylton High School in Woodbridge, Virginia. He played quarterback, throwing for 1,500 yards and 20 touchdowns as a senior. He led the Bulldogs to a 12–1 record and the state semifinals his junior year.

== College career ==
Reynolds played college football and participated in track and field for the Reedley College Tigers. He played quarterback for the Tigers. He passed for 1,752 yards and 13 touchdowns and rushed for 749 yards and 11 touchdowns as a freshman in 2007. The Tigers finished 8–3 in 2007.

Reynolds transferred to Iowa State University to play football for the Iowa State Cyclones. He led the Cyclones with 43 receptions, 695 receiving yards and seven touchdowns as a senior in 2011. He finished his career at Iowa State with 81 receptions, 1,050 receiving yards and nine receiving touchdowns.

== Professional career ==
Reynolds was rated the 63rd best wide receiver in the 2012 NFL draft by NFLDraftScout.com.

Pre-draft measurables
Height	Weight	40-yard dash	10-yard split	20-yard split	20-yard shuttle	Three-cone drill	Vertical jump	Broad jump	Bench press
6 ft 2 in (1.88 m)	206 lb (93 kg)	4.54 s	1.62 s	2.63 s	4.25 s	6.77 s	35 in (0.89 m)	10 ft 0 in (3.05 m)	23 reps
All values from Iowa State Pro Day

Reynolds signed with the Green Bay Packers on May 2, 2012 after going undrafted in the 2012 NFL draft. He was released by the Packers on May 16, 2012 after failing a physical.

He was signed by the Iowa Barnstormers of the Arena Football League (AFL) on July 2, 2012. He was named second-team All-Arena in 2014 after garnering 126 receptions, 1,884 receiving yards and 39 receiving touchdowns.

Reynold was assigned to the AFL's San Jose SaberCats on January 12, 2015. The Sabercats won ArenaBowl XXVIII against the Jacksonville Sharks on August 29, 2015.

On February 5, 2016, he was assigned to the Philadelphia Soul of the AFL. On August 26, 2016, the Soul beat the Arizona Rattlers in ArenaBowl XXIX by a score of 56–42. He earned first-team All-Arena honors in 2017. On August 26, 2017, the Soul beat the Tampa Bay Storm in ArenaBowl XXX by a score of 44–40.

Reynolds was selected by the Guangzhou Power in the fifth round of the 2017 CAFL draft.

=== AFL statistics ===
Legend
	Won the ArenaBowl
**Bold**	Career high

Year	Team	Receiving			Rushing			Returns			Defense				
Year	Team	Rec	Yds	TD	Att	Yds	TD	Ret	Yds	TD	Tkl	Ast	Sck	FF	FR
2012	Iowa	3	63	1	1	2	1	0	0	0	2	0	0.0	0	0
2013	Iowa	47	619	15	3	6	0	0	0	0	9	6	0.0	0	**2**
2014	Iowa	**126**	**1,885**	**39**	**14**	**18**	**8**	**14**	**154**	0	5	1	0.0	**1**	0
2015	San Jose	49	561	11	17	9	4	1	0	0	11	1	0.0	0	0
2016	Philadelphia	112	1,447	38	7	8	2	5	34	**3**	5	2	0.0	0	0
2017	Philadelphia	84	1,272	35	1	1	0	4	10	1	10	0	0.0	0	1
2018	Philadelphia	52	754	13	2	1	0	0	0	0	4	0	0.0	0	0
2019	Philadelphia	7	50	1	2	0	0	0	0	0	**19**	**10**	**0.5**	0	1
Career		480	6,651	153	47	45	15	24	198	4	65	20	0.5	1	4
