= Dan Raudabaugh =

American football player and coach (born 1987)

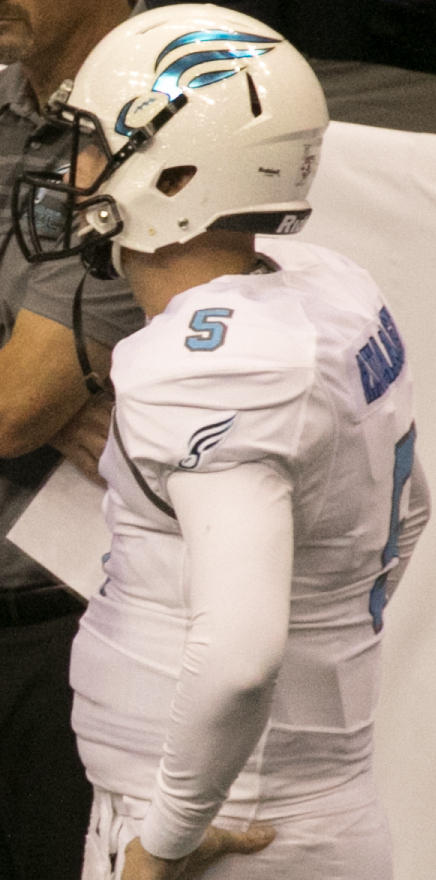
- Raudabaugh with the Philadelphia Soul in 2017

No. 5
- Position: Quarterback

Personal information
- Born: March 30, 1987 (age 39); Coppell, Texas, U.S.
- Listed height: 6 ft 3 in (1.91 m)
- Listed weight: 230 lb (104 kg)

Career information
- High school: Coppell
- College: Miami (OH)
- NFL draft: 2010: undrafted

Career history

Playing
- Dallas Vigilantes (2010–2011); Philadelphia Soul (2012–2019)

Coaching
- Frisco Fighters (2020–2022) Offensive coordinator

Awards and highlights
- 2× ArenaBowl champion (2016, 2017); AFL MVP (2015); AFL Offensive Player of the Year (2015); First-team All-Arena (2015); 2× Second-team All-Arena (2016, 2017); 2× AFL passing touchdowns leader (2015, 2017)

Career AFL statistics
- Comp. / Att.: 2,853 / 4,301
- Passing yards: 35,872
- TD–INT: 788–117
- QB rating: 120.36
- Rushing touchdowns: 4
- Stats at ArenaFan.com

Daniel "Red" Raudabaugh (born March 30, 1987) is an American former professional football quarterback who played in the Arena Football League (AFL) for the Dallas Vigilantes and Philadelphia Soul. He played college football at Miami University.

== Early life ==
Raudabaugh attended Coppell High School, in Coppell, Texas, where he was a member of the football and baseball team. He completed 95-of-187 passes for 1,282 yards and eight touchdowns during his senior season and was a second-team all-district selection in 2004. He was also a second-team all-district selection as a pitcher.

== College career ==
Raudabaugh attended Miami University, where he was a member of the football team. He finished his career ranked 5th on the RedHawk's all-time passing yards (5,352). He was third in all-time career completions (511) and also third in the school’s all-time pass attempts (916).

== Professional career ==
Raudabaugh was rated the 52nd best quarterback in the 2010 NFL draft by NFLDraftScout.com. He had a tryout with the Cincinnati Bengals in April 2010.

Pre-draft measurables
Height	Weight	20-yard shuttle	Three-cone drill	Vertical jump	Broad jump
6 ft 3 in (1.91 m)	218 lb (99 kg)	4.32 s	7.22 s	32 in (0.81 m)	8 ft 10 in (2.69 m)
All values from Miami Pro Day

=== Dallas Vigilantes ===
Raudabaugh signed late in the 2010 season with the Dallas Vigilantes of the Arena Football League (AFL), and saw action in its final two games. He engineered a 62–56 Dallas victory in the season finale against the Bossier–Shreveport Battle Wings by turning in a 22-of-29 performance for 311 yards. He also tied a Vigilantes team high with eight touchdown passes in the game. For the season, Raudabaugh completed 31-of-46 passes (67.4%) for 442 yards and 10 touchdowns. He threw one interception and had a passer rating of 128.8.

In 2011, Raudabaugh was the starter for the entire season. He finished the season having completed 360-of-557 passes (64.8%) for 4,741 yards and 90 touchdowns. He threw seven interception and had a passer rating of 118.3.

=== Philadelphia Soul ===
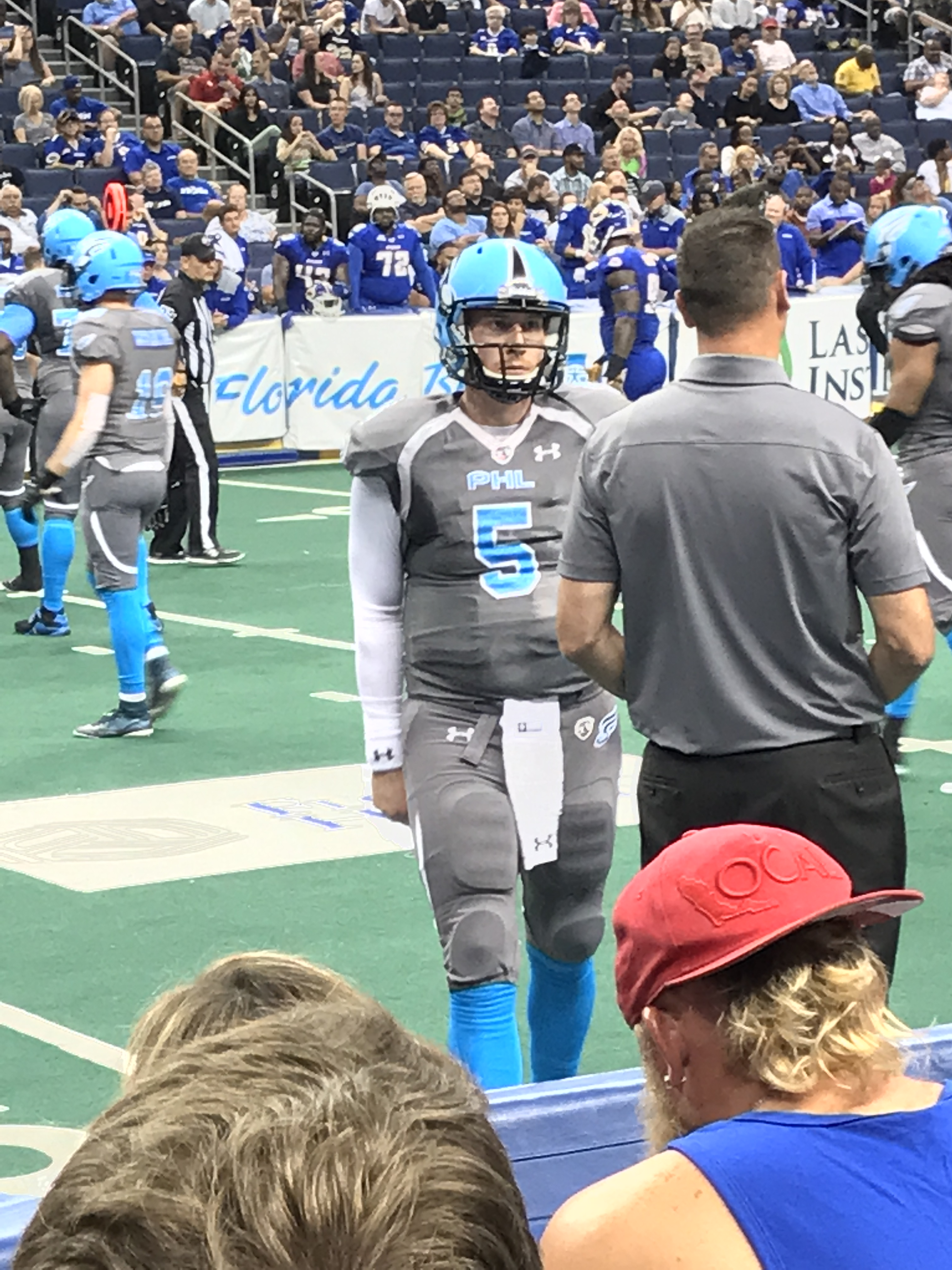
Raudabaugh (#5) in 2017

Raudabaugh followed Vigilantes head coach Clint Dolezel to the AFL's Philadelphia Soul in 2012. Raudabaugh led the Soul to ArenaBowl XXV in 2012, where they fell to the Arizona Rattlers. Raudabaugh lead the Soul to another ArenaBowl in 2013, once again facing the Rattlers.

In 2015, he earned AFL MVP, Offensive Player of the Year and first-team All-Arena honors after throwing for 4,995 yards and 119 touchdowns. In 2016, he threw for 4,303 yards and 101 touchdowns, earned second-team All-Arena accolades and helped the Soul beat the Arizona Ratters in ArenaBowl XXIX. In 2017, he threw for 3,175 yards and 82 touchdowns, earned second-team All-Arena accolades and helped the Soul beat the Tampa Bay Storm in ArenaBowl XXX.

After the 2019 season, the AFL folded. He again followed Soul head coach Clint Dolezel to the expansion Frisco Fighters of the Indoor Football League, but as an offensive coordinator on the coaching staff.

== Career statistics ==
Legend
	AFL MVP
	Won the ArenaBowl
	Led the league
**Bold**	Career high

=== AFL ===
Year	Team	Passing							Rushing		
Year	Team	Cmp	Att	Pct	Yds	TD	Int	Rtg	Att	Yds	TD
2010	Dallas	31	46	67.4	442	10	1	**128.80**	2	-2	0
2011	Dallas	360	557	64.6	4,741	90	17	118.27	**15**	8	0
2012	Philadelphia	362	540	67.0	4,790	115	**18**	120.60	13	-6	**2**
2013	Philadelphia	390	573	68.1	4,699	96	14	122.37	9	-18	0
2014	Philadelphia	363	562	64.6	4,328	85	**18**	112.46	5	**17**	0
2015	Philadelphia	**411**	**620**	66.3	**4,995**	**119**	12	122.41	4	15	1
2016	Philadelphia	339	490	69.2	4,303	101	13	124.86	1	-3	0
2017	Philadelphia	243	365	66.6	3,175	82	10	121.97	3	12	1
2018	Philadelphia	145	209	**69.4**	1,728	36	6	121.97	5	0	0
2019	Philadelphia	209	339	61.7	2,671	54	8	116.04	5	-4	0
Career		2,853	4,301	66.3	35,872	788	117	120.36	62	19	4

=== College ===
Year	Team	Passing							Rushing			
Year	Team	Cmp	Att	Yds	Pct	TD	Int	Rtg	Att	Yds	Avg	TD
2006	Miami (OH)	31	60	291	51.7	1	3	87.9	13	-37	-2.8	0
2007	Miami (OH)	209	382	2,431	54.7	12	12	112.3	38	27	0.7	0
2008	Miami (OH)	201	343	1,960	58.6	8	9	109.0	25	-22	-0.9	0
2009	Miami (OH)	70	131	670	53.4	3	5	96.3	17	-6	-0.4	0
Career		511	916	5,352	55.8	24	29	107.2	93	-38	-0.4	0
