= Tracy Belton =

American football player (born 1984)

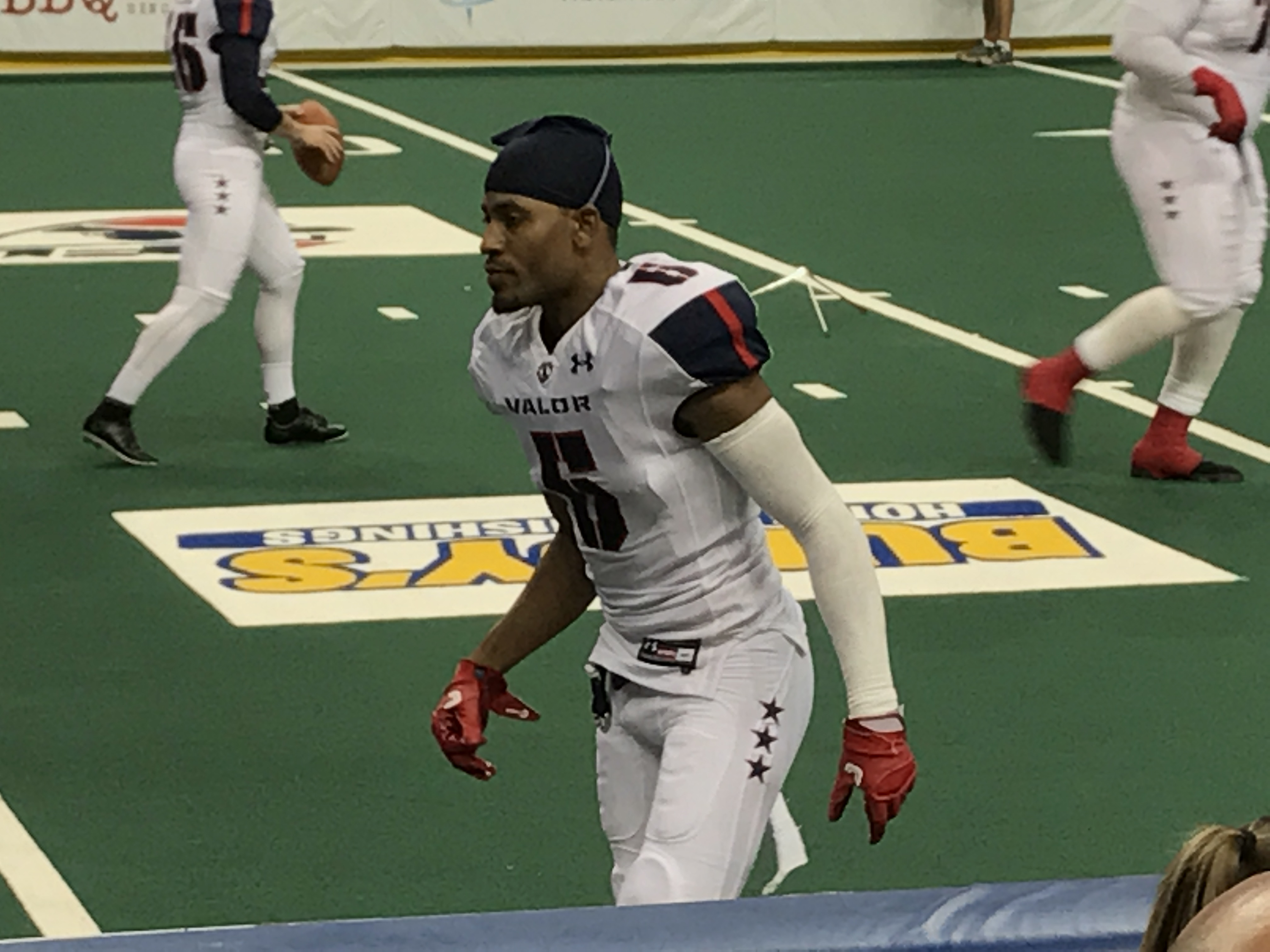
- Belton with the Washington Valor in 2017

No. 15, 3, 17, 2, 6
- Position: Defensive back

Personal information
- Born: May 8, 1984 (age 42)
- Listed height: 6 ft 0 in (1.83 m)
- Listed weight: 180 lb (82 kg)

Career information
- High school: Fork Union Military Academy (Fork Union, Virginia)
- College: UMass
- NFL draft: 2007: undrafted

Career history
- Arkansas Twisters (2008); Green Bay Blizzard (2009); Milwaukee Iron (2010); Georgia Force (2011–2012); Jacksonville Sharks (2013–2014); Orlando Predators (2014); New Orleans VooDoo (2015); Philadelphia Soul (2016); Washington Valor (2017–2018)

Awards and highlights
- 2× ArenaBowl champion (2016, 2018); 2× First-team All-Arena (2016, 2017); Second-team All-Arena (2012); AFL Defensive Player of the Year (2016); AFL Defensive Back of the Year (2016); First-team All-af2 (2009)

Career AFL statistics
- Tackles: 682.5
- Pass breakups: 113
- Interceptions: 51
- Forced fumbles: 10
- Fumbles recovered: 7
- Stats at ArenaFan.com

Tracy J. Belton (born May 8, 1984) is an American former professional football defensive back who played in the Arena Football League (AFL). He played college football for the UMass Minutemen. He was a member of the Arkansas Twisters, Green Bay Blizzard, Milwaukee Iron, Georgia Force, Jacksonville Sharks, Orlando Predators, New Orleans VooDoo, Philadelphia Soul, and Washington Valor.

== Early life ==
Belton attended Largo High School where he played football and basketball. Belton was named honorable mention All-Metro as a senior in 2001. Belton spent a season at Fork Union Military Academy as a post-graduate.

== College career ==
In 2003, Belton committed to the University of Massachusetts Amherst. He played for the UMass Minutemen from 2003 to 2006. He was the team's starter his final three years and helped the Minutemen to 36 wins. He played in 49 games during his career, including 41 starts at cornerback.

== Professional career ==
Belton was rated the 167th best cornerback in the 2007 NFL draft by NFLDraftScout.com.

In 2008, Belton joined the Arkansas Twisters of the af2.

Belton left the Twisters in 2009 to join the af2's Green Bay Blizzard. Belton was named first-team All-af2 following the season.

On March 14, 2010, Belton was assigned to the Milwaukee Iron of the Arena Football League (AFL).

Belton was assigned to the AFL's Georgia Force on October 7, 2010. Belton was assigned to the Force again on January 23, 2012. Belton was named second-team All-Arena following the 2012 season.

On February 6, 2013, Belton was assigned to the Jacksonville Sharks of the AFL on a two-year contract.

On April 9, 2014, Belton and Kyle Rowley were traded to the Orlando Predators to complete an earlier trade that sent Aaron Garcia. Belton was assigned to the Predators again on December 8, 2014.

On March 22, 2015, Belton was traded to the New Orleans VooDoo for future considerations.

Belton was assigned to the AFL's Philadelphia Soul in 2016, where he earned the Arena Football League Defensive Player of the Year Award and first-team All-Arena. Belton helped guide the Soul to an ArenaBowl XXIX championship.

Belton was assigned to the Washington Valor of the AFL on January 25, 2017. He earned first-team All-Arena honors in 2017.

== Career statistics ==
=== AFL ===
Year	Team										
Year	Team	Tkl	Ast	Sck	PB	FF	FR	Blk	Int	Yds	TD
2010	Milwaukee	83	35	0.0	9	2	1	0	6	39	0
2011	Georgia	92	19	0.0	11	0	1	0	9	124	1
2012	Georgia	49	11	0.0	9	0	1	0	11	124	1
2013	Jacksonville	81	27	0.0	20	5	1	0	3	36	1
2014	Jacksonville	12	4	0.0	2	0	0	0	0	0	0
2014	Orlando	52	11	0.0	5	0	0	0	5	48	2
2015	New Orleans	66	20	0.0	23	1	0	0	3	96	1
2016	Philadelphia	80	20	0.0	20	1	2	0	9	129	3
2017	Washington	54	16	0.0	8	0	1	0	5	45	1
2018	Washington	29	6	0.0	6	1	0	0	0	0	0
Career		598	169	0.0	113	10	7	0	51	641	10

=== College ===
Year	Team	Tackles						Interceptions				
Year	Team	Solo	Ast	Total	Loss	Sacks	FF	Int	Yards	Avg	TD	PD
2003	UMass	20	3	23	1.0	0.0	1	4	19	4.75	0	3
2004	UMass	49	8	57	2.0	0.0	1	5	62	12.4	0	4
2005	UMass	26	23	49	1.0	0.0	0	2	45	22.5	1	3
2006	UMass	43	34	77	8.0	3.0	0	2	42	21.0	0	3
Career		138	68	206	12.0	3.0	2	13	168	12.9	1	13
