= 2017 Washington Valor season =

Arena Football League team season

- Owner: Monumental Sports & Entertainment
- Head coach: Dean Cokinos
- Home stadium: Verizon Center

Results
- Record: 3–11
- League place: 5th
- Playoffs: Did not qualify

The 2017 Washington Valor season was the franchise's inaugural season and the city of Washington's first Arena Football League season since the Washington Commandos left in 1990. The Valor played their home games at the Verizon Center.

The Valor won their first-ever season game against the Baltimore Brigade 51–38 on April 7, 2017. Head coach Dean Cokinos, who previously coached the New Orleans VooDoo, led the Valor.

== Staff ==
2017 Washington Valor staff
Front office: Chairman – Ted Leonsis; President – Roger Mody	Coaches: Head coach – Dean Cokinos; Offensive coordinator – Steve Thonn; Assistant – Benji McDowell; Player coordinator – Cosmo Dematteo; Strength and conditioning – Ben Jenkins

== Final roster ==
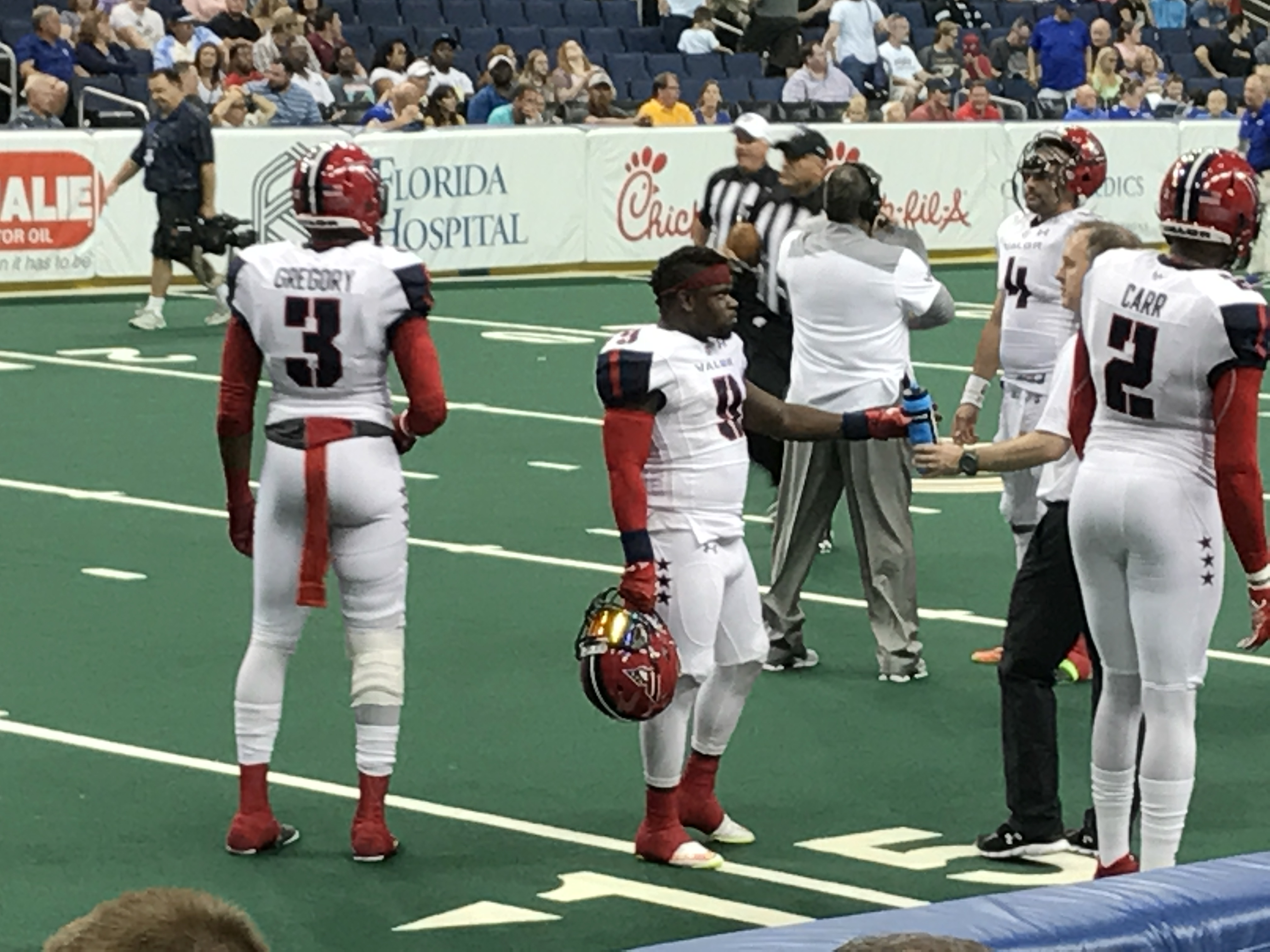
The Valor on May 20

2017 Washington Valor roster
Quarterbacks: 12 Sean Brackett; 8 Warren Smith; Fullbacks: 44 Will Corbin; Wide receivers: 17 Roger Jackson; 9 Charles McClain; 7 Darron Neal; 19 Josh Reese; 1 T. T. Toliver	Offensive linemen: 70 James Atoe; 68 Adam Shead; 65 Siosifa Tufunga; 76 David Wang; Defensive linemen: 42 J. R. Collins; 93 Everett Dawkins; 56 Jake Payne; 99 David Washington; 11 Reggie Wilson	Linebackers: 50 James Gordon; 5 James Harrell; Defensive backs: 23 Dominic Addison; 6 Tracy Belton; 21 Michael Knight; 10 Brian Smith; Kickers: 16 T. C. Stevens	Injured reserve: -- Kenyon Haughton OL (IR); 20 Cameron McGlenn DB (IR); 64 Jarien Moreland OL (IR); 72 Anthony Parker OL (IR); 74 Dionte Savage OL (IR); 10 Terrance Smith DB (IR); 7 Mike Washington WR (IR); 15 Justin Wilson WR (IR); Other league exempt: currently vacant; League suspension: 18 L. J. Castile WR (Susp.); -- Josh Gable K (Susp.); -- Jeremy Gallon WR (Susp.); -- Tommy Grady QB (Susp.); -- Bryson Kelly DL (Susp.); 5 Bernard Morris QB (Susp.); -- Moqut Ruffins OL (Susp.); -- Visesio Salt, Jr. (Susp.); -- Fred Williams WR (Susp.); Refused to report: -- Phillipkeith Manley OL (DNR); -- Nathan Stanley QB (DNR); Inactive reserve: 2 Greg Carr WR; Recallable reassignment: 91 Brandon Sesay DL; rookies in italics Roster updated August 3, 2017; 24 Active, 21 Inactive

== Schedule ==
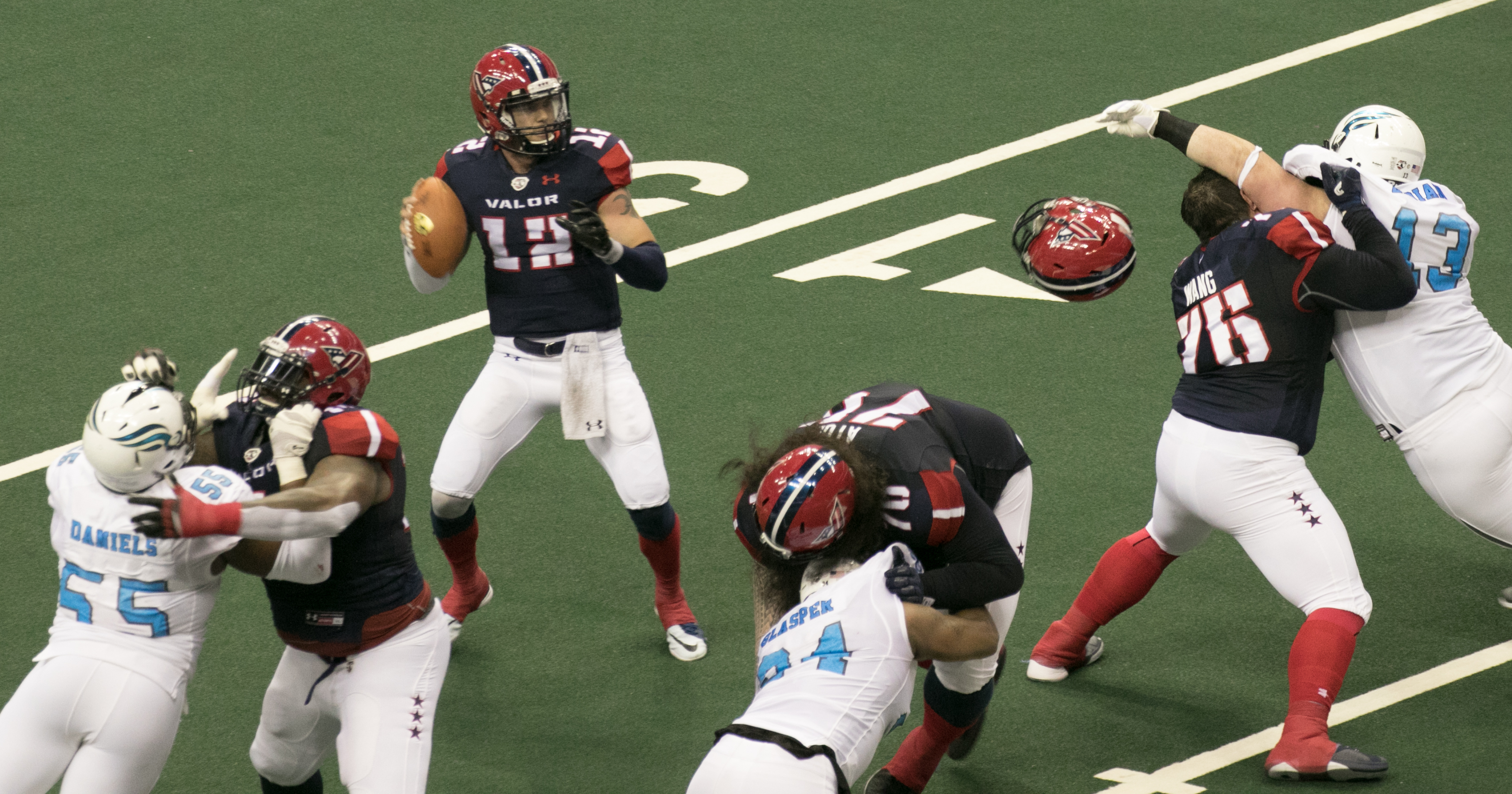
The Valor playing the Philadelphia Soul on May 27

=== Regular season ===
The 2017 regular season schedule was released on January 5, 2017.

Week	Day	Date	Kickoff	Opponent	Results		Location	Attendance	Report
Week	Day	Date	Kickoff	Opponent	Score	Record	Location	Attendance	Report
1	Friday	April 7	7:00 PM EDT	Baltimore Brigade	W 51–38	1–0	Verizon Center	15,579	
2	Bye								
3	Saturday	April 22	7:00 PM EDT	Philadelphia Soul	L 31–49	1–1	Verizon Center	12,122	
4	Friday	April 28	7:00 PM EDT	at Cleveland Gladiators	L 34–48	1–2	Quicken Loans Arena	9,223	
5	Bye								
6	Saturday	May 13	7:00 PM EDT	Tampa Bay Storm	L 33–41	1–3	Verizon Center	8,420	
7	Sunday	May 20	7:00 PM EDT	at Tampa Bay Storm	L 47–53	1–4	Amalie Arena	9,275	
8	Saturday	May 27	7:00 PM EDT	Philadelphia Soul	L 47–48	1–5	Verizon Center	9,873	
9	Saturday	June 3	7:00 PM EDT	Cleveland Gladiators	L 35–59	1–6	Verizon Center	9,901	
10	Saturday	June 10	7:00 PM EDT	at Tampa Bay Storm	L 57–58	1–7	Amalie Arena	9,856	
11	Bye								
12	Friday	June 23	7:00 PM EDT	at Baltimore Brigade	L 41–51	1–8	Royal Farms Arena	6,095	
13	Saturday	July 1	7:00 PM EDT	at Tampa Bay Storm	L 51–55	1–9	Amalie Arena	9,913	
14	Bye								
15	Saturday	July 15	7:00 PM EDT	at Philadelphia Soul	L 41–68	1–10	Wells Fargo Center	10,149	
16	Saturday	July 22	7:00 PM EDT	Baltimore Brigade	W 34–30	2–10	Verizon Center	10,266	
17	Saturday	July 29	7:00 PM EDT	Cleveland Gladiators	L 28–62	2–11	Verizon Center	11,127	
18	Friday	August 4	7:00 PM EDT	at Baltimore Brigade	W 41–35	3–11	Royal Farms Arena	6,089	

== Standings ==
2017 Arena Football League standings
Team	Overall			Points		Records			
Team	W	L	PCT	PF	PA	Home	Away	GB	STK
^{(1)}Philadelphia Soul	13	1	.929	817	590	7–0	6–1	—	W3
^{(2)}Tampa Bay Storm	10	4	.714	710	662	6–1	4–3	3.0	L1
^{(3)}Cleveland Gladiators	5	9	.357	696	715	3–4	2–5	8.0	W1
^{(4)}Baltimore Brigade	4	10	.286	620	749	3–4	1–6	9.0	L4
Washington Valor	3	11	.214	565	692	2–5	1–6	10.0	W1

^{(#)} - playoff position secured
