= Michael Lindsey =

American football player (born 1987)

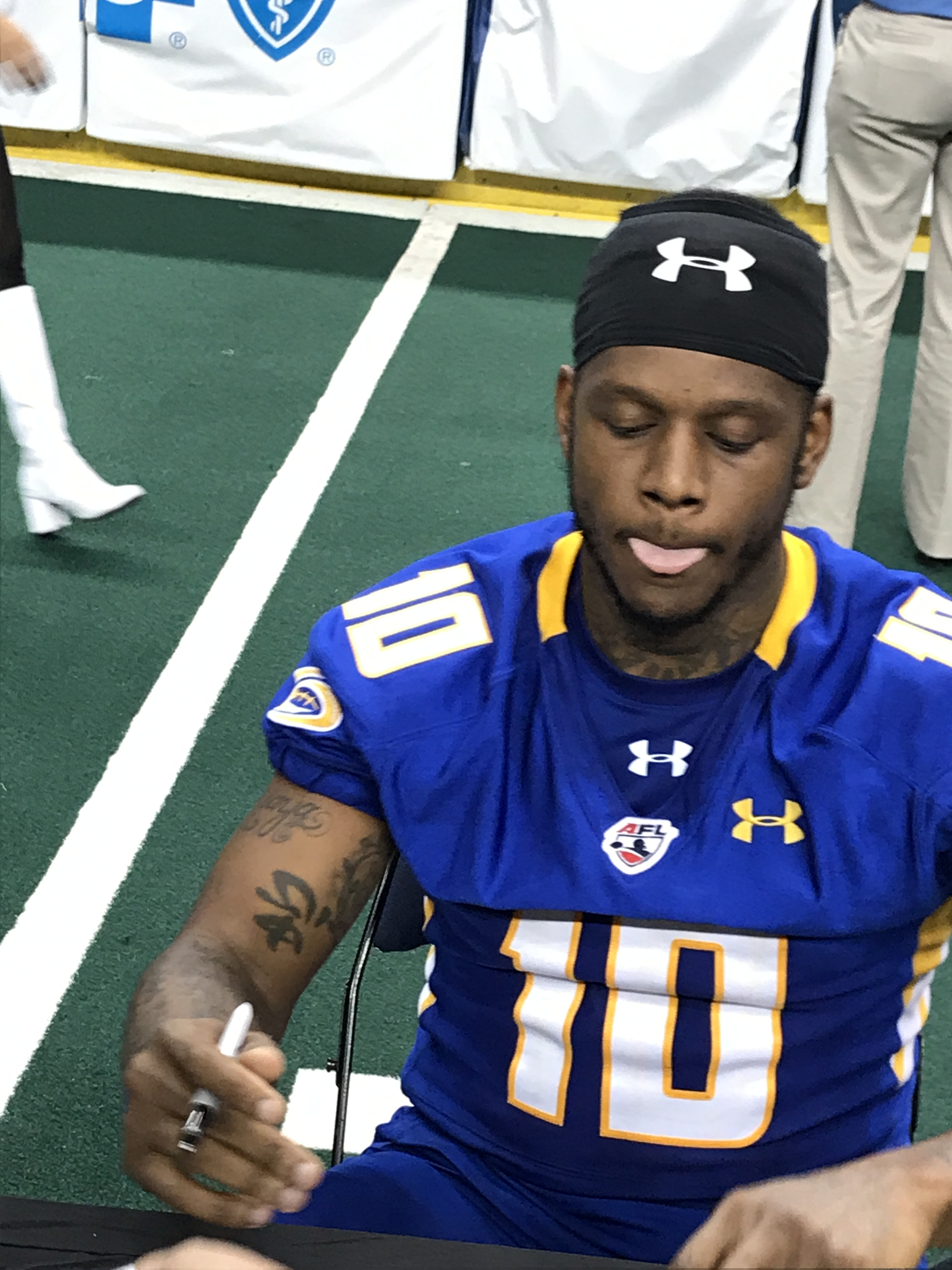
- Lindsey with the Tampa Bay Storm in 2017

No. 9, 10
- Position: Wide receiver

Personal information
- Born: July 10, 1987 (age 39)
- Listed height: 6 ft 1 in (1.85 m)
- Listed weight: 200 lb (91 kg)

Career information
- High school: Gulfport (FL) Boca Ciega
- College: Northwest Mississippi
- NFL draft: 2010: undrafted

Career history
- Tampa Bay Storm (2011–2014); Jacksonville Sharks (2015); Tampa Bay Storm (2016–2017)

Awards and highlights
- 2009 NJCAA All America First Team

Career AFL statistics
- Receptions: 215
- Receiving yards: 2,323
- Receiving touchdowns: 30
- Kickoff return yards: 6,650
- Kickoff return touchdowns: 6
- Stats at ArenaFan.com

Michael Lindsey (born July 10, 1987) is an American former professional football wide receiver who played in the Arena Football League (AFL) for the Tampa Bay Storm and Jacksonville Sharks.

== Professional career ==
In 2011, Lindsey signed with the Tampa Bay Storm. He had a tremendous rookie season with the Storm, setting the franchise record for kickoff return yards in a single season. He re-signed with the Storm for the 2012 season.

On August 13, 2015, Lindsey was assigned to the Jacksonville Sharks.

On June 16, 2016, Lindsey was assigned to the Storm. On July 8, 2016, Lindsey was placed on reassignment. He was assigned to the Storm on January 12, 2017. The Storm folded in December 2017.
