= Kody Afusia =

American football player (born 1992)

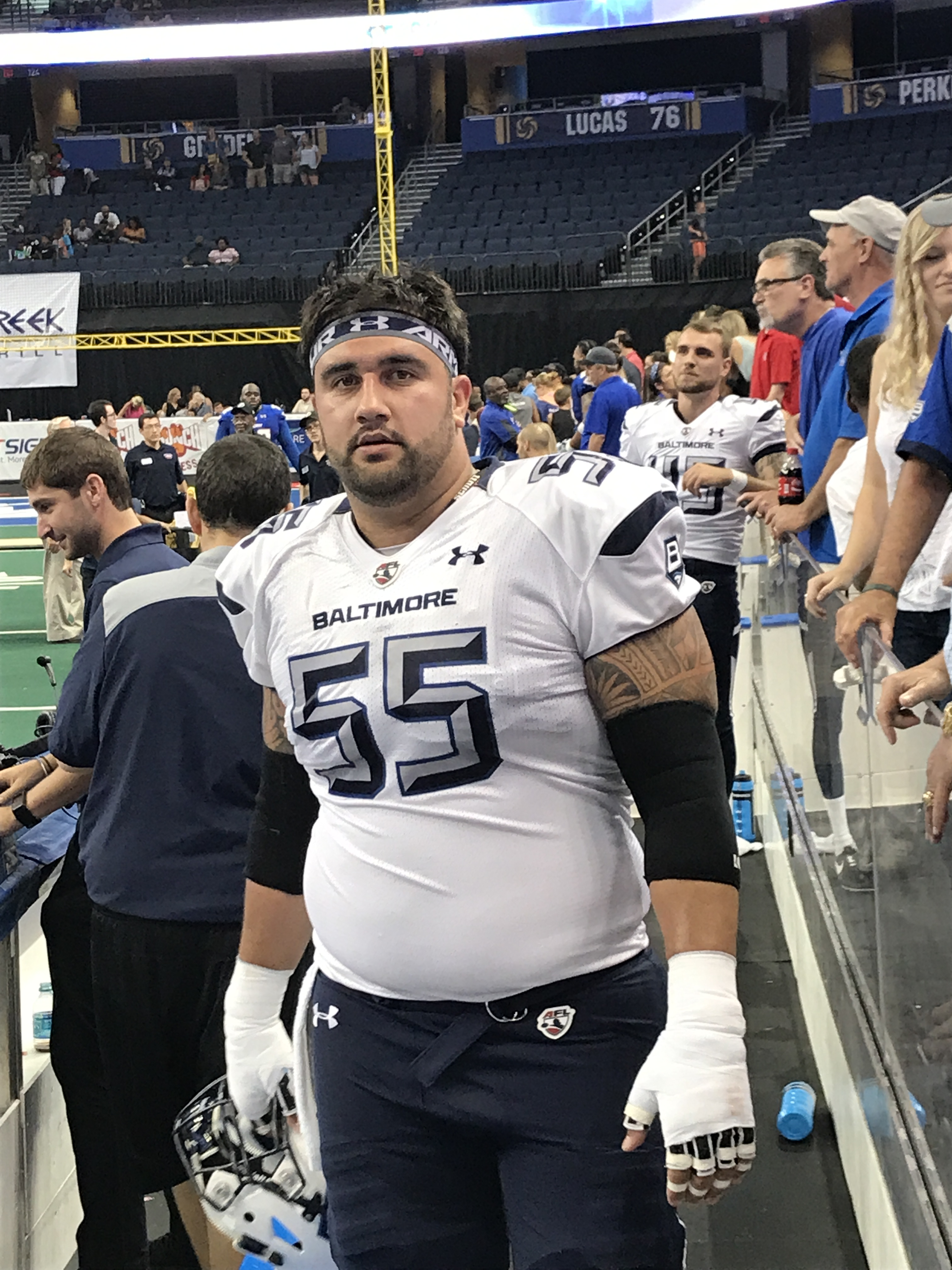
- Afusia with the Baltimore Brigade in 2017

No. 54, 77, 55
- Position: Offensive lineman

Personal information
- Born: August 11, 1992 (age 34); Fountain Valley, California
- Listed height: 6 ft 3 in (1.91 m)
- Listed weight: 310 lb (141 kg)

Career information
- High school: Huntington Beach (CA) Ocean View
- College: Hawaii
- NFL draft: 2015: undrafted

Career history
- Los Angeles KISS (2015–2016); Iowa Barnstormers (2017); Baltimore Brigade (2017)

Awards and highlights
- Second-team All-Arena (2017)

Career AFL statistics
- Tackles: 1
- Stats at ArenaFan.com

Kody Afusia (born August 11, 1992) is an American former football offensive lineman. He played college football at University of Hawaii at Manoa and attended Ocean View High School in Huntington Beach, California. He was a member of the Los Angeles KISS, Iowa Barnstormers, and Baltimore Brigade.

== Early life ==
College recruiting
Name	Hometown	School	Height	Weight	Commit date
Kody Afusia; OG	Huntington Beach, California	Ocean View High School	6 ft 2 in (1.88 m)	295 lb (134 kg)	Feb 2, 2010
Kody Afusia; OG	Recruit ratings: Scout: Rivals: 247Sports: ESPN: (NR)				
Overall recruit ranking: Scout: 29 (C) Rivals: -- (OG), -- (CA) 247Sports: 135 (OG) ESPN: -- (C), -- (CA)
Note: In many cases, Scout, Rivals, 247Sports, On3, and ESPN may conflict in their listings of height and weight.; In these cases, the average was taken. ESPN grades are on a 100-point scale.; Sources: "Hawaii Football Commitment List". Rivals.; "Hawaii College Football Recruiting Commits". Scout.; "ESPN". ESPN.; "Scout.com Team Recruiting Rankings". Scout.; "2010 Team Ranking". Rivals.com.; "Kody Afusia". 247Sports.

== College career ==
Afusia played for the Hawaii Rainbow Warriors from 2010 to 2014. He was the team's starter his final two years and helped the Warriors to 5 wins. He played in 37 games during his career including 16 starts at guard and 7 at center.

== Professional career ==
Pre-draft measurables
Height	Weight	40-yard dash	10-yard split	20-yard split	20-yard shuttle	Three-cone drill	Vertical jump	Broad jump	Bench press
6 ft 2 in (1.88 m)	303 lb (137 kg)	5.35 s	1.86 s	3.02 s	4.87 s	7.46 s	28.5 in (0.72 m)	8 ft 2 in (2.49 m)	22 reps
All values from Hawaii Pro Day

After going undrafted in the 2015 NFL draft, Afusia was invited to rookie mini-camp with the Arizona Cardinals.

On July 14, 2015, Afusia was assigned to the Los Angeles KISS of the Arena Football League. Afusia appeared in four games with the KISS in 2015, starting 3. In 2016, Afusia appeared in 8 games starting 6.

Afusia signed with the Iowa Barnstormers of the Indoor Football League on October 25, 2016. On January 19, 2017, Afusia was placed on the transfer list.

Afusia was assigned to the Baltimore Brigade on January 12, 2017. He earned Second Team All-Arena honors in 2017.
