= Paul Stephens =

American gridiron football player (born 1987)

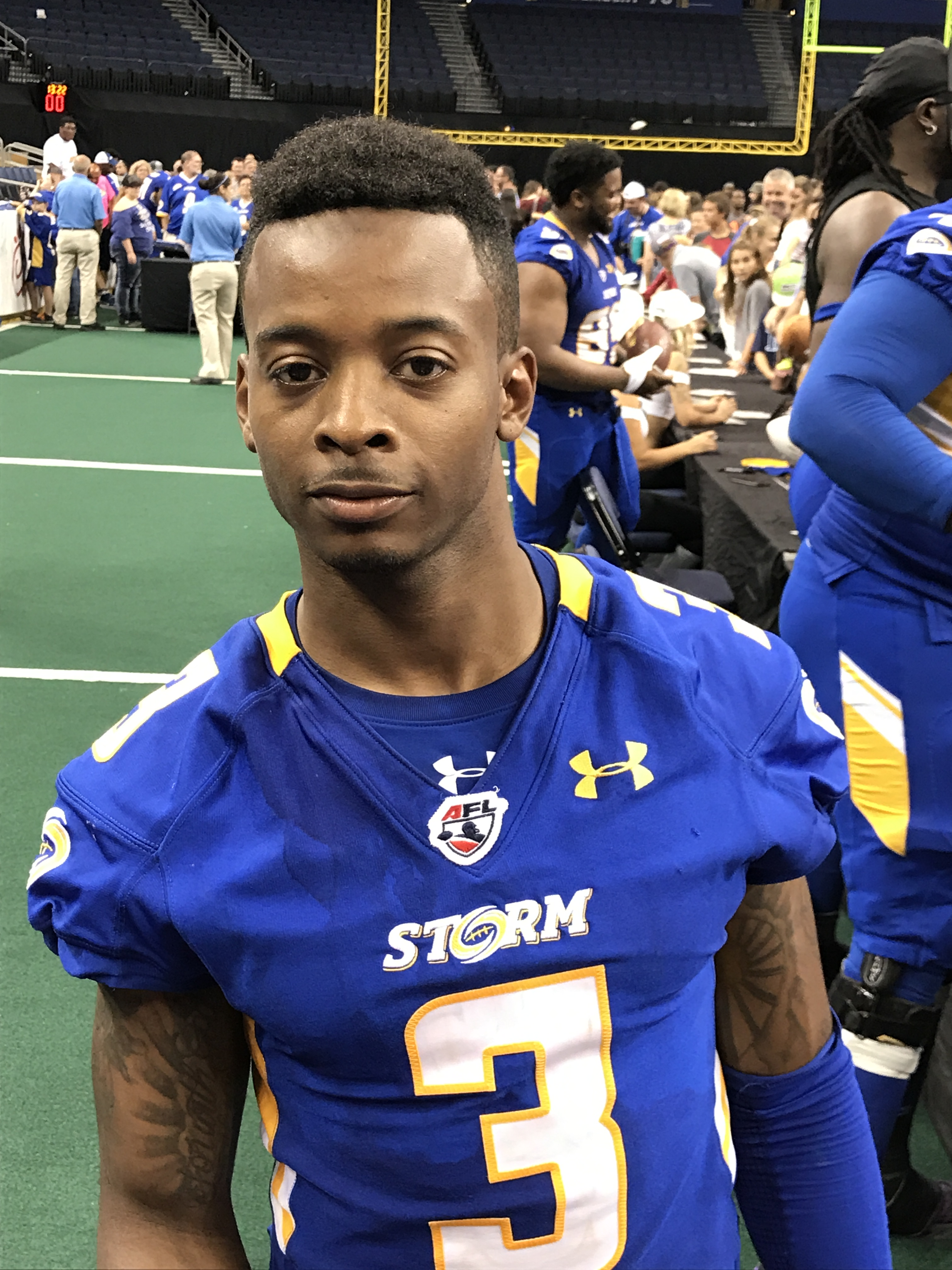
- Stephens with the Tampa Bay Storm in 2017

No. 1, 3
- Position: Defensive back

Personal information
- Born: April 23, 1987 (age 39); Missouri City, Texas, U.S.
- Listed height: 5 ft 9 in (1.75 m)
- Listed weight: 180 lb (82 kg)

Career information
- High school: Hightower (Missouri City)
- College: Blinn Buccaneers (2005–2007); Arkansas State (2008–2009); Central Missouri (2010)
- NFL draft: 2011: undrafted

Career history
- Spokane Shock (2012–2014); BC Lions (2014)*; Orlando Predators (2015–2016); Tampa Bay Storm (2017)
- * Offseason or practice squad member only

Career AFL statistics
- Tackles: 357
- Interceptions: 25
- Pass breakups: 73
- Stats at ArenaFan.com

Paul Stephens (born April 23, 1987) is an American former professional football defensive back who played in the Arena Football League (AFL). He played college football at the University of Central Missouri.

== Early life ==
Stephens attended Hightower High School in Missouri City, Texas, where he played football and basketball.

== College career ==
Stephens played for the Blinn Buccaneers from 2005 to 2007. Stephens transferred to Arkansas State and played in 2008 with the Red Wolves before he was dismissed from the team. Stephens played for the Central Missouri Mules in 2010. He was the team's starter his only year and helped the Mules to 11 wins. He played in 23 games during his career including 4 starts at cornerback.

== Professional career ==
Pre-draft measurables
Height	Weight	40-yard dash	10-yard split	20-yard split	20-yard shuttle	Three-cone drill	Vertical jump	Broad jump	Bench press
5 ft 8 in (1.73 m)	168 lb (76 kg)	4.55 s	1.50 s	2.71 s	4.41 s	7.40 s	38 in (0.97 m)	10 ft 9 in (3.28 m)	8 reps
All values from Michigan State Pro Day

=== Spokane Shock ===
Stephens was assigned to the Spokane Shock on February 22, 2012. Stephens returned to the Shock in 2013. Stephens recorded 12 interceptions in 2013, including 5 on April 19, 2013, against the San Jose SaberCats.

=== BC Lions ===
Stephens signed with the BC Lions of the Canadian Football League in May 2014. Stephens failed to make the Lions and was cut on June 1, 2014.

=== Orlando Predators ===
On January 9, 2015, Stephens was assigned to the Orlando Predators. On February 15, 2016, Stephens returned to the Predators for another season.

=== Tampa Bay Storm ===
Stephens was assigned to the Tampa Bay Storm on May 2, 2017.
