= Fred Obi =

American football player (born 1990)

No. 3, 22, 6, 5, 15
- Position: Cornerback

Personal information
- Born: September 7, 1990 (age 36); Inglewood, California, U.S.
- Listed height: 6 ft 1 in (1.85 m)
- Listed weight: 200 lb (91 kg)

Career information
- High school: Morningside (CA)
- College: San Diego
- NFL draft: 2012: undrafted

Career history
- San Jose SaberCats (2015); Los Angeles KISS (2016); Cleveland Gladiators (2017); Baltimore Brigade (2018); Washington Valor (2018–2019)

Awards and highlights
- 2× ArenaBowl champion (2015, 2018); 2× Second-team All-Arena (2016, 2017)

Career AFL statistics
- Tackles: 224
- Interceptions: 14
- Pass breakups: 47
- Forced fumbles: 3
- Fumble recoveries: 4
- Stats at ArenaFan.com

Fredrick "Fred" Obi (born September 7, 1990) is an American former professional football cornerback. He was assigned to the San Jose SaberCats on March 16, 2015. As a rookie, Obi recorded four interceptions and 43 tackles in only seven games. He played in all three of the SaberCats' 2015 playoff games, including the team's ArenaBowl XXVIII victory over the Jacksonville Sharks. On January 15, 2016, Obi was assigned to the Los Angeles KISS. On March 20, 2017, he was assigned to the Cleveland Gladiators. He earned Second Team All-Arena honors in 2017. On March 20, 2018, Obi was assigned to the Baltimore Brigade. On May 2, 2018, he was placed on recallable reassignment. On June 8, 2018, he was assigned to the Washington Valor. On March 22, 2019, Obi was again assigned to the Valor
