= Derrick Summers =

American football player (born 1988)

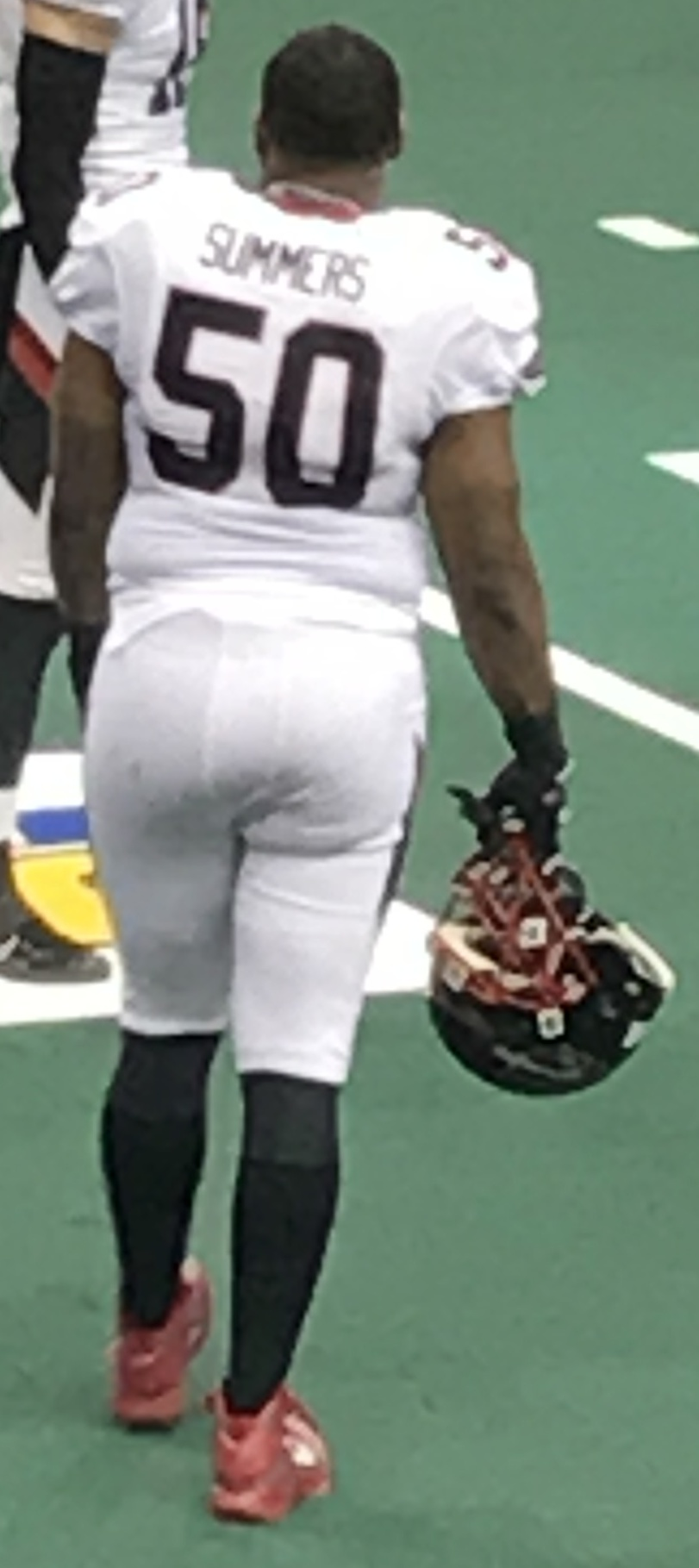
- Summers with the Cleveland Gladiators in 2017

No. 56, 50
- Position: Fullback / Linebacker

Personal information
- Born: June 19, 1988 (age 38); Southfield, Michigan, U.S.
- Listed height: 6 ft 2 in (1.88 m)
- Listed weight: 260 lb (118 kg)

Career information
- High school: Southfield (MI)
- College: Toledo
- NFL draft: 2010: undrafted

Career history
- Jacksonville Sharks (2011–2013); Toronto Argonauts (2012); Hamilton Tiger-Cats (2012)*; Spokane Shock (2014–2015); Los Angeles KISS (2016); Cleveland Gladiators (2017); Albany Empire (2018); Columbus Destroyers (2019)
- * Offseason or practice squad member only

Awards and highlights
- ArenaBowl champion (2011); 3× Second-team All-Arena (2011, 2017, 2018)

Career AFL statistics
- Tackles: 256
- Sacks: 50
- Forced fumbles: 11
- Fumble recoveries: 7
- Blocked kicks: 4
- Stats at ArenaFan.com

Derrick Edward Summers (born June 19, 1988) is an American former professional football defensive lineman. He played as a defensive end for the University of Toledo.

Summers started his AFL Journey with the Jacksonville Sharks in 2011. He played three seasons for the Sharks, helping them win three South Division Championships (2011–13), the 2011 American Conference Championship, and the 2011 AFL World Championship as the Sharks defeated the Arizona Rattlers In Arena Bowl XXIV.

On May 14, 2012, Summers signed a one-year contract with the Toronto Argonauts of the Canadian Football League. He was released by the Argonauts on October 18, 2012. He was signed by the Hamilton Tiger-Cats and subsequently released on May 15, 2013, prior to the beginning of the 2013 CFL season.

On November 11, 2015, Summers was assigned to the Los Angeles KISS.

On October 14, 2016, Summers was assigned to the Cleveland Gladiators during the dispersal draft. He earned Second Team All-Arena honors in 2017. He also helped the Gladiators reach the Semi-finals of the 2017 AFL Playoffs.

On March 19, 2018, Summers was assigned to the Albany Empire. Summers earned Second Team All-Arena honors for the 2018 season.

On March 5, 2019, Summers was assigned to the Columbus Destroyers.

His 50 career sacks are the fourth most in AFL history.
