= 2017 Arena Football League season =

- League: Arena Football League
- Sport: Arena football
- Duration: April 7, 2017 – August 5, 2017

Regular season
- Season champions: Philadelphia Soul
- Season MVP: Randy Hippeard, TAM

League postseason
- #1 vs #4 champions: Philadelphia Soul
- #1 vs #4 runners-up: Baltimore Brigade
- #2 vs #3 champions: Tampa Bay Storm
- #2 vs #3 runners-up: Cleveland Gladiators

ArenaBowl XXX
- Champions: Philadelphia Soul
- Runners-up: Tampa Bay Storm
- Finals MVP: Darius Prince, PHI

AFL seasons
- ← 2016 2018 →

AFL teams

The 2017 Arena Football League season was the 30th season in the history of the Arena Football League (AFL). Prior to the start of the season, the league contracted to five teams. Due to this, for the first time since 1991, the league was not divided into conferences or divisions. The 14-game regular season began on April 7, 2017, when the two new teams, the Baltimore Brigade and the Washington Valor, faced off in the Verizon Center, and ended on August 5, 2017, when the Tampa Bay Storm lost against the Philadelphia Soul.

ArenaBowl XXX was held on August 26, 2017, at the Wells Fargo Center in Philadelphia, as the Soul repeated as champs by beating the Storm by a score of 44–40.

== League business ==
=== Teams ===
On February 10, 2016, The Washington Post and radio station WTOP-FM first broke the story that Monumental Sports & Entertainment (Ted Leonsis, chairman) were "close to a deal" to bring a new expansion franchise to the Verizon Center. On March 10, 2016, AFL commissioner Scott Butera announced that the deal was finalized and that the new Washington, D.C., team would begin play in 2017. On July 14, 2016, the team name was revealed as the Washington Valor. There was also talk for franchises to return to San Antonio and St. Louis as well as a potential new team for Sacramento. However, when the 2017 schedule was announced, there was no mention of any San Antonio, St. Louis, or Sacramento teams.

On October 12, 2016, the Orlando Predators announced they had left the league due to the reduced number of teams and other pending disagreements with the league. Hours later, the Jacksonville Sharks also announced they would be leaving the AFL and later joined the National Arena League. The next day, it was reported that the Arizona Rattlers were in the planning stages to also leave the AFL for the Indoor Football League for 2017. In the same report, it was stated the Los Angeles Kiss and Portland Steel had apparently folded after both teams failed to return calls or respond to inquiries into 2017 season ticket purchases. Later on October 13, the league held a teleconference with the remaining team owners and issued a statement the next morning declaring that the league would continue in the long-term, although the league did not expressly commit to playing in 2017 at that time.

On October 14, the AFL held a dispersal draft with the five remaining teams selecting players from the Jacksonville, Los Angeles, Orlando, and Portland rosters. The Rattlers then officially left the AFL for the IFL on October 17, leaving the AFL with four teams. They were the sixth AFL team to leave for the IFL since the 2010 relaunch. On November 14, the AFL announced that it had granted a second franchise to Washington Valor owner Ted Leonsis to be based out of Baltimore for the 2017 season bringing the league up to five teams. On January 25, after the announcement of the schedule, MSE announced that the team would be called the Baltimore Brigade.

=== Schedule and playoff changes ===
On January 5, 2017, the schedule was announced. The five teams played 14 games through 18 weeks, with four bye weeks for each team and no divisions. Each team played each other three or four times throughout the season. The postseason saw a structure change, with four teams advancing. The top seed hosted the fourth seed and the second seed hosted the third seed in a semifinal round, each match for a spot in ArenaBowl XXX on August 26.

== Regular season standings ==
2017 Arena Football League standings
Team	Overall			Points		Records			
Team	W	L	PCT	PF	PA	Home	Away	GB	STK
^{(1)}Philadelphia Soul	13	1	.929	817	590	7–0	6–1	—	W3
^{(2)}Tampa Bay Storm	10	4	.714	710	662	6–1	4–3	3.0	L1
^{(3)}Cleveland Gladiators	5	9	.357	696	715	3–4	2–5	8.0	W1
^{(4)}Baltimore Brigade	4	10	.286	620	749	3–4	1–6	9.0	L4
Washington Valor	3	11	.214	565	692	2–5	1–6	10.0	W1

^{(#)} - playoff position secured

== Playoffs ==
Semifinals
1	Philadelphia	69
4	Baltimore	54
2	Tampa Bay	73
3	Cleveland	59

ArenaBowl XXX
1	Philadelphia	44
2	Tampa Bay	40

=== Semifinals ===
All times listed are in EDT.

Date	Kickoff	Away	Score	Home	Game site	Recap
August 12	4:00 p.m.	Baltimore Brigade	54–69	Philadelphia Soul	Wells Fargo Center	
August 14	7:00 p.m.	Cleveland Gladiators	59–73	Tampa Bay Storm	Amalie Arena	

=== ArenaBowl XXX ===
Date	Kickoff	Away	Score	Home	Game site	Recap
August 26	7:00 p.m.	Tampa Bay Storm	40–44	Philadelphia Soul	Wells Fargo Center	

== Awards ==
=== Players of the week ===
The following were named the top performers during the 2017 season:

Week	Offensive Player of the Week	Defensive Player of the Week
1	Mike Washington (Valor)	Caesar Rayford (Storm)
2	Darius Reynolds (Soul)	Dexter Davis Jr. (Brigade)
3	Randy Hippeard (Storm)	Alvin Ray Jackson (Storm)
4	Ryan McDaniel (Soul)	Dwayne Hollis (Soul)
5	Randy Hippeard (Storm)	Paul Stephens (Storm)
6	Joe Hills (Storm)	Sean Daniels (Soul)
7	Joe Hills (Storm)	Joe Goosby (Soul)
8	Shane Carden (Brigade)	Josh Victorian (Brigade)
9	Arvell Nelson (Gladiators)	Rayshaun Kizer (Gladiators)
10	Dan Raudabaugh (Soul)	LaRoche Jackson (Storm)
11	Darius Reynolds (Soul)	Kenny Veal (Gladiators)
12	Shaun Kauleinamoku (Soul)	Kent Richardson (Soul)
13	Kendrick Ings (Storm)	Tracy Belton (Valor)
14	Shane Carden (Brigade)	Varmah Sonie (Brigade)
15	Dan Raudabaugh (Soul)	James Romain (Soul)
16	T. T. Toliver (Valor)	Alvin Ray Jackson (Storm)
17	Mykel Benson (Soul)	Derrick Summers (Gladiators)
18	Darius Reynolds (Soul)	Robert Hayes (Brigade)

=== All-Arena team ===
Offense
Position	First team	Second team
Quarterback	Randy Hippeard, Tampa Bay	Dan Raudabaugh, Philadelphia
Fullback	Mykel Benson, Philadelphia	Jeramie Richardson, Cleveland
Wide receiver	Joe Hills, Tampa Bay; Darius Reynolds, Philadelphia; Kendrick Ings, Tampa Bay	Quentin Sims, Cleveland; Shaun Kauleinamoku, Philadelphia; Michael Preston, Cleveland
Center	Raymond McNeil, Tampa Bay	Kody Afusia, Baltimore
Offensive lineman	Wayne Tribue, Philadelphia; Anthony Parker, Washington	Dionte Savage, Washington; Aslam Sterling, Cleveland

Defense
Position	First team	Second team
Defensive end	Khreem Smith, Baltimore; Sean Daniels, Philadelphia	Nick Seither, Cleveland; Robert Hayes, Baltimore
Defensive tackle	Justin Lawrence, Philadelphia	Willie McGinnis, Cleveland
Middle linebacker	Beau Bell, Philadelphia	Derrick Summers, Cleveland
Jack linebacker	Alvin Ray Jackson, Tampa Bay	Joe Goosby, Philadelphia
Defensive back	Tracy Belton, Washington; Dwayne Hollis, Philadelphia; James Romain, Philadelphia	Frederick Obi, Cleveland; Varmah Sonie, Baltimore; Josh Victorian, Baltimore

Special teams
Position	First team	Second team
Kicker	Adrian Trevino, Philadelphia	Pat Clarke, Baltimore
Special teams	Kendrick Ings, Tampa Bay	Brandon Thompkins, Baltimore

== Attendances ==
Team	Home average
Washington Valor	11,041
Cleveland Gladiators	10,173
Philadelphia Soul	9,680
Tampa Bay Storm	9,668
Baltimore Brigade	5,679
Overall average	9,248
