= Alvin Ray Jackson =

American football player (born 1980)

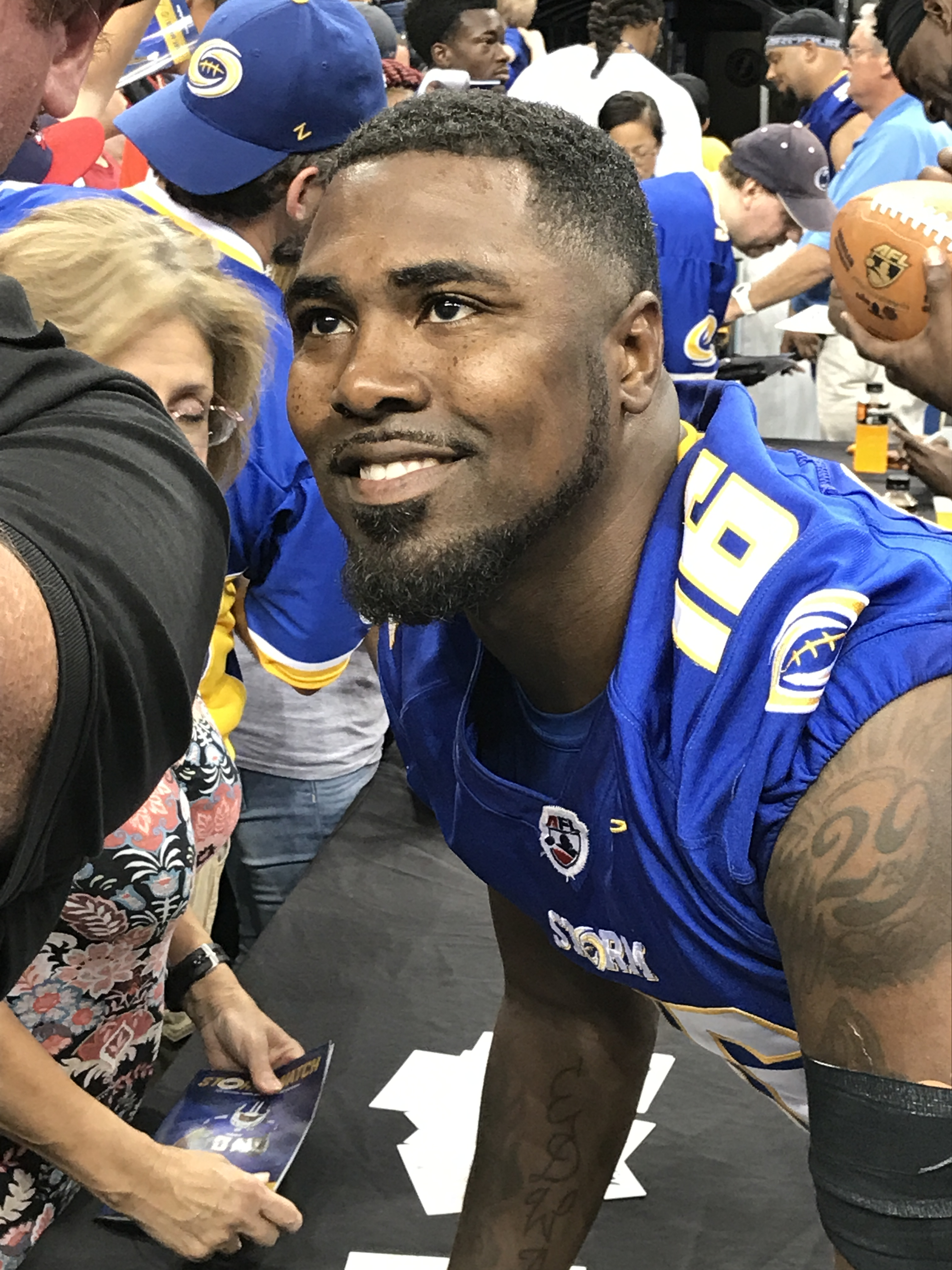
- Jackson with the Tampa Bay Storm in 2017

No. 17, 16
- Position: Linebacker

Personal information
- Born: September 27, 1980 (age 46); Como, Mississippi, U.S.
- Listed height: 6 ft 3 in (1.91 m)
- Listed weight: 215 lb (98 kg)

Career information
- High school: Sardis (MS) North Panola
- College: Albany State
- NFL draft: 2004: undrafted

Career history
- South Georgia Wildcats (2006, 2008); Albany Firebirds (2009); Arkansas Diamonds (2010); New Orleans VooDoo (2011–2012); Pittsburgh Power (2013); New Orleans VooDoo (2014); Cleveland Gladiators (2014); Jacksonville Sharks (2015–2016); Cleveland Gladiators (2017)*; Tampa Bay Storm (2017); Albany Empire (2018); Washington Valor (2018–2019)
- * Offseason or practice squad member only

Awards and highlights
- 3× First-team All-Arena (2012, 2015, 2017); All-af2 (2009)

Career AFL statistics
- Tackles: 404
- Sacks: 1
- Interceptions: 42
- Stats at ArenaFan.com

Alvin Ray Jackson (born September 27, 1980) is an American former professional football linebacker who played in the Arena Football League (AFL).

== Early life ==
Born the son of Alvin and Sherry Jackson, Alvin prepped at North Panola High School in Sardis, Mississippi, where he was a three-sport athlete, lettering in football, basketball, and track and field. Named All-District twice in football, where he was a cornerback and quarterback. Was a four-year standout in basketball, and was named All-District twice in the 200 meter dash. As a senior, finished fourth in the state in the 200m event. He was on his way to the University of Alabama, when his academics failed to allow him acceptance.

== College career ==
Alvin attended, Northwest Mississippi Community College where he was a wide receiver/punt returner. Had over 45 receptions for 1,100 yards and 12 touchdowns in his lone season with the Rangers.

Alvin then transferred to Jacksonville State University, where he saw limited playing time.

He would ultimately end up at Albany State University, where he would have over 75 receptions, 1,300 receiving yards and 13 touchdowns while also returning punts. Named All-Southern Intercollegiate Athletic Conference Second Team (twice). His best season came as a junior with 37 receptions for 712 yards and seven touchdowns to go along with 30 punt returns for 404 yards and a touchdown. He was also known for 1-for-1 passing as a junior with a 28-yard touchdown pass. Finished his junior season ranked No. 17 in the nation in punt returns with a 13.5 yards/return.

== Professional career ==
=== South Georgia Wildcats ===
Signed and played with the South Georgia Wildcats (af2) in 2006 and 2008.

=== Albany Firebirds ===
Played for the Albany Firebirds (af2) in 2009. Was an All-AF2 selection at linebacker in 2009.

=== Arkansas Diamonds ===
Jackson tried out for the Arkansas Diamonds of the Indoor Football League in 2010, but was later released when he was contacted by the VooDoo.

=== New Orleans VooDoo ===
Jackson signed with the New Orleans VooDoo on October 13, 2010. During the 2011 season, he led the team in tackles with 89. In 2012, he earned First-Team All-Arena recognition after setting a single-season franchise record and tied for the AFL-high with 14 interceptions. He also became the VooDoo's all-time leader in tackles with 164 for his career.

=== Pittsburgh Power ===
On November 27, 2012, Jackson signed a 3-year contract with the Pittsburgh Power. The move reunited him with his former defensive coordinator, Power head coach Derek Stingley. Jackson was reassigned on September 12, 2013.

=== Return to the VooDoo ===
The VooDoo claimed Jackson off reassignment on September 14, 2013. Jackson was placed on reassignment on June 30, 2014.

=== Jacksonville Sharks ===
On March 25, 2015, Jackson was assigned to the Jacksonville Sharks.

=== Cleveland Gladiators ===
On October 14, 2016, Jackson was selected by the Cleveland Gladiators during the dispersal draft. On March 25, 2017, Jackson was placed on recallable reassignment.

=== Tampa Bay Storm ===
On March 28, 2017, Jackson was assigned to the Tampa Bay Storm. He earned First Team All-Arena honors in 2017. The Storm folded in December 2017.

=== Albany Empire ===
On March 19, 2018, Jackson was assigned to the Albany Empire. On March 29, 2018, he was placed on recallable reassignment.

=== Washington Valor ===
On May 17, 2018, he was assigned to the Washington Valor. On March 12, 2019, Jackson was assigned to the Valor again.

== Coaching ==
During the 2013 season, he coached Fort Valley State University. He was responsible for coaching the wide receivers and kickoff return units. That season the Wildcat football team finished with a 4–6 record.
