= ArenaBowl XXIX =

Annual league championship game

Philadelphia Soul (American)	Arizona Rattlers (National)
56	42
	1	2	3	4	Total
PHI	28	7	7	14	56
ARI	7	14	14	7	42
- Date: August 26, 2016
- Stadium: Gila River Arena; Glendale, Arizona
- MVP: Shaun Kauleinamoku, Philadelphia: Maurice Purify, Arizona (Offensive Player of the Game); Tracy Belton, Philadelphia (Defensive Player of the Game); Shaun Kauleinamoku, Philadelphia (Playmaker of the Game)
- Attendance: 13,390
- Winning coach: Clint Dolezel
- Losing coach: Kevin Guy

TV in the United States
- Network: ESPN
- Announcers: Ari Wolfe, Sherdrick Bonner and Tina Cervasio

ArenaBowl XXIX was the championship game of the 2016 Arena Football League season. It was played between the American Conference Champion Philadelphia Soul and the National Conference Champion Arizona Rattlers. The game was played at Gila River Arena in Glendale, Arizona.

This was the Arizona Rattlers' tenth ArenaBowl appearance and the Philadelphia Soul's fourth appearance. It was the Soul's second ArenaBowl victory.

== Venue ==
The game was played at Gila River Arena in Glendale, Arizona due to the Rattlers' usual home arena of Talking Stick Resort Arena being the site of a WNBA game between the Phoenix Mercury and Dallas Wings on the same day.

== Television ==
This was the third consecutive ArenaBowl televised on ESPN.

== Background ==
The Philadelphia Soul finished the regular season with a 13–3 record and the number one seed in the American Conference. The Soul then beat the Tampa Bay Storm in the American Conference Semifinals and the Jacksonville Sharks in the American Conference Championship. The Arizona Rattlers finished the regular season with a 13–3 record and the number one seed in the National Conference. The Rattlers then beat the Portland Steel in the National Conference Semifinals and the Cleveland Gladiators in the National Conference Championship.

== Box score ==
Quarter	1	2	3	4	Total
Soul (AC)	28	7	7	14	56
Rattlers (NC)	7	14	14	7	42

at Gila River Arena, Glendale, Arizona

- Date: August 26, 2016
- Game time: 7:00 p.m. EDT
- Game attendance: 13,390
- Referee: Tom McCabe

Scoring summary

Quarter	Time	Drive			Team	Scoring information	Score	
Quarter	Time	Plays	Yards	TOP	Team	Scoring information	PHI	ARI
1	12:36	4	45	2:24	PHI	Darius Reynolds 16-yard touchdown reception from Raudabaugh, Frevert kick good	7	0
1	9:00				PHI	Hollis 49-yard fumble return touchdown, Frevert kick good	14	0
1	7:55				PHI	Belton net recovery touchdown off kickoff, Frevert kick good	21	0
1	5:24	4	41	2:31	ARI	Purify 16-yard touchdown reception from Davila, Pertuit kick good	21	7
1	1:20	4	45	3:22	PHI	McDaniel 22-yard touchdown reception from Raudabaugh, Frevert kick good	28	7
2	13:54	3	32	1:58	ARI	Benson 1-yard touchdown run, Pertuit kick good	28	14
2	1:54	3	45	2:02	PHI	Reynolds 25-yard touchdown reception from Raudabaugh, Frevert kick good	35	14
2	0:02	5	31	0:48	ARI	Benson 1-yard touchdown run, Pertuit kick good	35	21
3	12:24	4	38	0:00	ARI	Windsor 3-yard touchdown reception from Davila, Pertuit kick good	35	28
3	4:38	9	48	7:02	PHI	Kauleinamoku 12-yard touchdown reception from Raudabaugh, Frevert kick good	42	28
3	3:01	2	11	0:58	ARI	Windsor 2-yard touchdown reception from Davila, Pertuit kick good	42	35
4	14:50	3	41	1:08	ARI	Purify 6-yard touchdown reception from Davila, Pertuit kick good	42	42
4	10:27	6	45	3:42	PHI	Kauleinamoku 11-yard touchdown reception from Raudabaugh, Frevert kick no good	48	42
4	4:04	3	30	1:42	PHI	Kauleinamoku 30-yard touchdown reception from Raudabaugh, 2-point run by McDaniel good	56	42
"TOP" = time of possession. For other American football terms, see Glossary of American football.							56	42
