= ArenaBowl XXX =

| Tampa Bay Storm | Philadelphia Soul |
|---|---|
| 40 | 44 |
| | 1 | 2 | 3 | 4 | Total |
|---|---|---|---|---|---|
| TB | 6 | 14 | 7 | 13 | 40 |
| PHL | 0 | 14 | 14 | 16 | 44 |
- Date: August 26, 2017
- Stadium: Wells Fargo Center; Philadelphia, Pennsylvania
- MVP: Darius Prince, Philadelphia: Mykel Benson, Philadelphia (Offensive Player of the Game); James Romain, Philadelphia (Defensive Player of the Game)
- Attendance: 13,648
- Winning coach: Clint Dolezel
- Losing coach: Ron James

TV in the United States
- Network: WPVI-TV, AFLNow, Twitter
- Announcers: Ari Wolfe, Sherdrick Bonner and Jeff Skversky (WPVI-TV); Jon Meterparel and Joe DeCamara (AFLNow and Twitter)

ArenaBowl XXX was the championship game of the 2017 Arena Football League season. The game was broadcast on AFLNow, Twitter and WPVI-TV. It was played between the Philadelphia Soul and Tampa Bay Storm at the Wells Fargo Center in Philadelphia. It was the Soul's third ArenaBowl championship and fifth appearance while it was the Storm's tenth appearance. The Soul set an ArenaBowl record for largest comeback victory after overcoming a 20–7 deficit.

== Box score ==
| Quarter | 1 | 2 | 3 | 4 | Total |
|---|---|---|---|---|---|
| Storm | 6 | 14 | 7 | 13 | 40 |
| Soul | 0 | 14 | 14 | 16 | 44 |

at Wells Fargo Center, Philadelphia, Pennsylvania

- Date: August 26, 2017
- Game time: 7:00 p.m. EDT
- Game attendance: 13,648
- Referee: Dave Cutaia

Scoring summary

| Quarter | Time | Drive | | | Team | Scoring information | Score | |
| Quarter | Time | Plays | Yards | TOP | Team | Scoring information | TAM | PHI |
|---|---|---|---|---|---|---|---|---|
| 1 | 7:10 | | | | TAM | Ings 57-yard missed field goal return, Lewis kick failed | 6 | 0 |
| 2 | 10:53 | 8 | 39 | 5:19 | PHI | Prince 2-yard touchdown reception from Raudabaugh, Trevino kick good | 6 | 7 |
| 2 | 8:35 | 2 | 35 | 1:24 | TAM | Hills 35-yard touchdown reception from Hippeard, Lewis kick good | 13 | 7 |
| 2 | 5:44 | | | | TAM | Interception returned 26 yards for touchdown by Jackson, Lewis kick good | 20 | 7 |
| 2 | 0:30 | 10 | 45 | 4:50 | PHI | Benson 1-yard touchdown run, Trevino kick good | 20 | 14 |
| 3 | 12:54 | 3 | 45 | 2:06 | PHI | Reynolds 40-yard touchdown reception from Raudabaugh, Trevino kick good | 20 | 21 |
| 3 | 9:22 | 2 | 38 | 2:32 | TAM | Ings 33-yard touchdown reception from Hippeard, Lewis kick good | 27 | 21 |
| 3 | 4:32 | 6 | 45 | 4:02 | PHI | Benson 1-yard touchdown run, Trevino kick good | 27 | 28 |
| 4 | 9:24 | 7 | 25 | 4:53 | PHI | Prince 1-yard touchdown reception from Raudabaugh, Trevino kick good | 27 | 35 |
| 4 | 7:33 | | | | PHI | Hippeard tackled in end zone for a safety by Daniels | 27 | 37 |
| 4 | 6:13 | 2 | 42 | 1:20 | TAM | Hilton 42-yard touchdown reception from Hippeard, Lewis kick good | 34 | 37 |
| 4 | 5:13 | 1 | 16 | 0:45 | PHI | Kauleinamoku 16-yard touchdown reception from Raudabaugh, Trevino kick good | 34 | 44 |
| 4 | 0:00 | 2 | 18 | 0:05 | TAM | Ings 7-yard touchdown reception from Hippeard, no kick - game over | 40 | 44 |
| "TOP" = time of possession. For other American football terms, see Glossary of American football. | | | | | | | 40 | 44 |
