= 2018 Baltimore Brigade season =

Arena Football League team season

- Owner: Monumental Sports & Entertainment
- Head coach: Omarr Smith
- Home stadium: Royal Farms Arena

Results
- Record: 7–5
- League place: 2nd
- Playoffs: Lost ArenaBowl XXXI

The 2018 Baltimore Brigade season is the second season for the franchise in the Arena Football League. The Brigade play home games at the Royal Farms Arena.

== Standings ==
2018 Arena Football League standings
Team	Overall			Points		Records			
Team	W	L	PCT	PF	PA	Home	Away	GB	STK
(#)-Albany Empire	8	4	.667	646	564	4–3	4–1	—	W3
Baltimore Brigade	7	5	.583	605	562	5–1	2–4	1	L3
Philadelphia Soul	7	5	.583	612	577	3-2	4-3	1	L1
Washington Valor	2	10	.167	482	642	1–5	1–5	6	W1

^{(#)} - clinched regular season title

== Staff ==
Baltimore Brigade staff
Front office: Chairman – Ted Leonsis	Coaches: Head coach – Omarr Smith; Defensive coordinator/assistant head coach – Walt Housman; Defensive backs/special teams coordinator – Virgil Gray; Assistant – James Roe; Assistant – Scott Bailey

== Roster ==
2018 Baltimore Brigade roster
Quarterbacks: 7 Shane Boyd; 12 Randy Hippeard; Fullbacks: 23 Rory Nixon; Wide receivers: 17 Brandon Collins; 18 Quentin Sims; 3 D. J. Stephens; 14 Brandon Thompkins; 84 Milton Williams	Offensive linemen: 44 Rodney Austin; 70 Colin Madison; 63 Jordan McCray; 50 Raymond McNeil; 60 Jeremiah Warren; Defensive linemen: -- Cliff Dukes; 24 Rodney Fritz; 90 Monte Lewis; 99 Justin Lawrence	Linebackers: 55 Dexter Jackson; Defensive backs: 13 David Hyland; 2 Michael Knight; 1 Joe Powell; 8 Clevan Thomas; 5 Josh Victorian; Kickers: 19 Mark Lewis	Injured reserve: 6 Willie Bailey DB (IR); 9 Damien Borel DL (IR); 11 Lamark Brown WR (IR); 4 Virgil Gray DB (IR); 7 Kendrick Ings WR (IR); 48 Royce LaFrance DL (IR); 2 Nias Martin DB (IR); -- Cleshawn Page DB (IR); 75 Kyron Samuels OL (IR); Other league exempt: -- Rashaun Simonise WR (Exempt); League suspension: -- Daniel Adams WR (Susp.); -- Qumain Black DB (Susp.); 93 Kendall Montgomery DL (Susp.); -- Rykeem Yates DL (Susp.); Refused to report: Currently vacant; Inactive reserve: Currently vacant; Recallable reassignment Rookies in italics Roster updated July 18, 2018; 24 Active, 13 Inactive → More rosters

== Schedule ==
=== Regular season ===
The 2018 regular season schedule was released on February 13, 2018.

Week	Day	Date	Kickoff	Opponent	Results		Location	Attendance	Report
Week	Day	Date	Kickoff	Opponent	Score	Record	Location	Attendance	Report
1	Friday	April 13	7:00 PM EDT	Washington Valor	W 61–56	1–0	Royal Farms Arena	5,358	
2	Sunday	April 21	7:00 PM EDT	at Philadelphia Soul	L 49–54	1–1	Wells Fargo Center	9,326	
3	Saturday	April 28	3:00 PM EDT	Albany Empire	W 52–49	2–1	Royal Farms Arena	4,796	
4	Friday	May 4	7:00 PM EDT	Philadelphia Soul	W 31–21	3–1	Royal Farms Arena	4,833	
5	Bye								
6	Saturday	May 19	3:00 PM EDT	at Washington Valor	W 42–41	4–1	Capital One Arena	7,198	
7	Friday	May 25	7:00 PM EDT	Philadelphia Soul	W 54–35	5–1	Royal Farms Arena	5,035	
8	Saturday	June 2	7:00 PM EDT	at Albany Empire	L 53–61	5–2	Times Union Center	8,056	
9	Saturday	June 9	7:00 PM EDT	at Albany Empire	W 59–56	6–2	Times Union Center	8,767	
10	Friday	June 15	7:00 PM EDT	Washington Valor	W 72–42	7–2	Royal Farms Arena	5,105	
11	Saturday	June 23	7:30 PM EDT	Albany Empire	L 49–56	7–3	Royal Farms Arena	5,552	
12	Saturday	June 30	7:00 PM EDT	at Philadelphia Soul	L 48–49	7–4	Wells Fargo Center	8,432	
13	Saturday	July 7	3:00 PM EDT	at Washington Valor	L 35–42	7–5	Capital One Arena	6,116	

=== Playoffs ===
Round	Day	Date	Kickoff	Opponent	Result	Location	Attendance
Semifinal #1	Sunday	July 15	6:00 PM EDT	at Philadelphia Soul	W 57–45	Wells Fargo Center	8,164
Semifinal #2	Friday	July 20	7:00 PM EDT	Philadelphia Soul	W 53–41	Royal Farms Arena	5,139
ArenaBowl XXXI	Saturday	July 28	7:00 PM EDT	Washington Valor	L 55–69	Royal Farms Arena	8,183
