= 2018 Washington Valor season =

Indoor American football league season

- Owner: Monumental Sports & Entertainment
- Head coach: Dean Cokinos (fired week 5, 0–4 record); Benji McDowell (interim, 2–6 record)
- Home stadium: Capital One Arena

Results
- Record: 2–10
- League place: 4th
- Playoffs: Won ArenaBowl XXXI

The 2018 Washington Valor season was the second season for the franchise in the Arena Football League. The Valor play at the Capital One Arena. The team finished fourth at the end of the regular season. After losing the first game of their semifinal series against the Albany Empire, the Valor won the second game and advanced to ArenaBowl XXXI by virtue of aggregate score. The Valor would go on to win the Arena Bowl by defeating the Baltimore Brigade 69–55.

== Standings ==
2018 Arena Football League standings
Team	Overall			Points		Records			
Team	W	L	PCT	PF	PA	Home	Away	GB	STK
(#)-Albany Empire	8	4	.667	646	564	4–3	4–1	—	W3
Baltimore Brigade	7	5	.583	605	562	5–1	2–4	1	L3
Philadelphia Soul	7	5	.583	612	577	3-2	4-3	1	L1
Washington Valor	2	10	.167	482	642	1–5	1–5	6	W1

^{(#)} - clinched regular season title

== Staff ==
2018 Washington Valor staff
Front office: Chairman – Ted Leonsis; President – Roger Mody	Coaches: Head coach – Benji McDowell (Interim); Offensive coordinator –; Assistant coach –; Player coordinator – Cos Dematteo; Strength and conditioning – Ben Jenkins; Team Physician - Dr. Jeffrey Mayer, MD

=== Roster ===
2018 Washington Valor roster
Quarterbacks: 4 Arvell Nelson; 8 Warren Smith; Fullbacks: currently vacant; Wide receivers: 9 Jared Dangerfield; 2 Chris Duvalt; 3 Reggie Gray; 18 Douglas McNeil; 19 Josh Reese; 1 T. T. Toliver	Offensive linemen: 70 James Atoe; 53 Devonte Danzey; 72 Anthony Parker; 75 Jordan Mudge; 74 Dionte Savage; 60 Siosifa Tufunga; Defensive linemen: 52 Zack Bullock; 42 Lanford Collins; 99 Jake Payne; 40 David Washington	Linebackers: 50 James Gordon; 17 Alvin Ray Jackson; Defensive backs: 6 Tracy Belton; 24 Svante Davenport; 14 Oshay Dunmore; 15 Fred Obi; Kickers: 7 Pat Clarke	Injured reserve: 23 Dominic Addison DB (IR); -- Josh Atkinson WR (IR); 90 Austin Brown DL (IR); 44 Will Corbin FB (IR); 10 Qua Cox DB (IR); 10 Nick Davila QB (IR); 25 Michael Everett DB (IR); 12 Roosevelt Falls DL (IR); 93 Roderick Henderson DL (IR); 5 Greg Reid DB (IR); 58 Khreem Smith DL (IR); 11 Reggie Wilson DL (IR); 16 Rod Windsor WR (IR); Other league exempt: currently vacant; League suspension: -- Ben Curtis OL (Susp.); 15 Justin Wilson WR (Susp.); Refused to report: currently vacant; Inactive reserve: currently vacant; Recallable reassignment: currently vacant; rookies in italics Roster updated July 19, 2018; 25 Active, 15 Inactive → More rosters

== Schedule ==
=== Regular season ===
The 2018 regular season schedule was released on February 13, 2018.

Week	Day	Date	Kickoff	Opponent	Results		Location	Attendance	Report
Week	Day	Date	Kickoff	Opponent	Score	Record	Location	Attendance	Report
1	Friday	April 14	7:00 PM EDT	at Baltimore Brigade	L 56–61	0–1	Royal Farms Arena	5,358	
2	Bye								
3	Saturday	April 28	3:00 PM EDT	at Philadelphia Soul	L 49–52	0–2	Wells Fargo Center	10,164	
4	Saturday	May 5	7:00 PM EDT	at Albany Empire	L 23–47	0–3	Times Union Center	10,065	
5	Friday	May 11	7:00 PM EDT	Albany Empire	L 42–53	0–4	Capital One Arena	9,037	
6	Saturday	May 19	3:00 PM EDT	Baltimore Brigade	L 41–42	0–5	Capital One Arena	7,198	
7	Saturday	May 26	7:00 PM EDT	at Albany Empire	L 21–48	0–6	Times Union Center	7,847	
8	Thursday	May 31	7:00 PM EDT	Philadelphia Soul	L 46–51	0–7	Capital One Arena	4,711	
9	Sunday	June 10	1:00 PM EDT	at Philadelphia Soul	W 49–48	1–7	Wells Fargo Center	9,636	
10	Friday	June 15	7:00 PM EDT	at Baltimore Brigade	L 42–72	1–8	Royal Farms Arena	5,105	
11	Friday	June 22	7:30 PM EDT	Philadelphia Soul	L 28–63	1–9	Capital One Arena	8,351	
12	Friday	June 29	7:00 PM EDT	Albany Empire	L 41–55	1–10	Capital One Arena	5,044	
13	Saturday	July 7	3:00 PM EDT	Baltimore Brigade	W 42–35	2–10	Capital One Arena	6,116	

=== Playoffs ===
Round	Day	Date	Kickoff	Opponent	Result	Location
Semifinal #1	Saturday	July 14	6:00 PM EDT	Albany Empire	L 56–57 OT	Capital One Arena
Semifinal #2	Saturday	July 21	7:00 PM EDT	at Albany Empire	W 47–40	Times Union Center
ArenaBowl XXXI	Saturday	July 28	7:00 PM EDT	at Baltimore Brigade	W 69–55	Royal Farms Arena
