= 2018 Philadelphia Soul season =

Arena Football League team season

- Owner: Ron Jaworski; Craig Spencer; Pete Ciarrocchi
- General manager: Phil Bogle
- Head coach: Clint Dolezel
- Home stadium: Wells Fargo Center

Results
- Record: 7–5
- League place: 3rd
- Playoffs: Eliminated in semifinals

The 2018 Philadelphia Soul season was the thirteenth season for the franchise in the Arena Football League. The Soul played at the Wells Fargo Center. The team finished tied for second at the end of the regular season but was seeded third in the playoffs due to the AFL tiebreak procedure. They then lost both games in their aggregate score semi-final series against the Baltimore Brigade.

== Standings ==
2018 Arena Football League standings
Team	Overall			Points		Records			
Team	W	L	PCT	PF	PA	Home	Away	GB	STK
(#)-Albany Empire	8	4	.667	646	564	4–3	4–1	—	W3
Baltimore Brigade	7	5	.583	605	562	5–1	2–4	1	L3
Philadelphia Soul	7	5	.583	612	577	3-2	4-3	1	L1
Washington Valor	2	10	.167	482	642	1–5	1–5	6	W1

^{(#)} - clinched regular season title

== Staff ==
2018 Philadelphia Soul staff
Front office: Majority owner – Craig A. Spencer; Majority owner – Ron Jaworski; Ownership group – Pete Ciarrocchi; Ownership group – Cosmo DeNicola; Ownership group – Martin E. Judge; Ownership Group - Marques Colston; Ownership Group - Dick Vermeil; Ownership Group - Nicholas Giuffre; Ownership Group - Jahri Evans; Ownership Group - Philip Jaurigue; Ownership Group - Stewart Anmuth; Ownership Group - Gil Peter; Ownership Group - Hal Brunson	Head coach: Head coach – Clint Dolezel; Offensive coaches: Assistant head coach – Phil Bogle; Offensive Coordinator - Steve Criswell; Defensive coaches: Defensive backs – Bernie Nowotarski

=== Roster ===
2018 Philadelphia Soul roster
Quarterbacks: 4 Shane Austin; 5 Dan Raudabaugh; Fullbacks: 3 Jeramie Richardson; Wide receivers: 21 Shaun Kauleinamoku; 9 Lonnie Outlaw; 6 Darius Prince; 7 Darius Reynolds; 19 Aaron Wascha	Offensive linemen: 44 Phillipkeith Manley; 72 Keith Newell; 77 Neal Tivis; 69 Wayne Tribue; Defensive linemen: 14 Brett Bowers; 92 Calvin France; 56 Willie McGinnis; 8 Jake Metz; 76 Walter Thomas	Linebackers: 18 Joe Goosby; Defensive backs: 16 Kyle Chandler; 22 Dwayne Hollis; 24 Torez Jones; 23 LaRico Stevenson; 25 James Romain; Kicker: 12 Adrian Trevino	Injured reserve: 10 Robert Brown DB (IR); 55 Sean Daniels DL (IR); 58 Thomas Dover DL (IR); 45 Adrian Ferns FB (IR); 99 Robert Hayes DL (IR); 1 Poppy Livers WR (IR); 2 Greg McGhee QB (IR); 63 Leonard Sanelli OL (IR); 11 John Sheehy DL (IR); 20 Bryce Peila DB (IR); Refused to report: currently vacant; League suspension: -- Michael Fowler WR (Susp.); 13 Danny Southwick QB (Susp.); Other league exempt: currently vacant; Inactive reserve: currently vacant; Recallable reassignment: currently vacant; rookies in italics Roster updated July 18, 2018; 24 Active, 12 Inactive → More rosters

== Schedule ==
=== Regular season ===
The 2018 regular season schedule was released on February 13, 2018.

Week	Day	Date	Kickoff	Opponent	Results		Location	Attendance	Report
Week	Day	Date	Kickoff	Opponent	Score	Record	Location	Attendance	Report
1	Saturday	April 14	7:00 PM EDT	at Albany Empire	W 56–35	1–0	Times Union Center		
2	Sunday	April 21	7:00 PM EDT	Baltimore Brigade	W 54–49	2–0	Wells Fargo Center	9,326	
3	Saturday	April 28	3:00 PM EDT	Washington Valor	W 52–49	3–0	Wells Fargo Center	9,326	
4	Friday	May 4	7:00 PM EDT	at Baltimore Brigade	L 21–31	3–1	Royal Farms Arena	4,833	
5	Bye								
6	Saturday	May 19	3:00 PM EDT	Albany Empire	L 36–41	3–2	Wells Fargo Center		
7	Friday	May 25	7:00 PM EDT	at Baltimore Brigade	L 35–54	3–3	Royal Farms Arena		
8	Thursday	May 31	7:00 PM EDT	at Washington Valor	W 51–46	4–3	Capital One Arena		
9	Sunday	June 10	1:00 PM EDT	Washington Valor	L 48–49	4–4	Wells Fargo Center		
10	Saturday	June 16	6:00 PM EDT	at Albany Empire	W 75–74	5–4	Times Union Center		
11	Friday	June 22	7:30 PM EDT	at Washington Valor	W 63–28	6–4	Capital One Arena		
12	Saturday	June 30	7:00 PM EDT	Baltimore Brigade	W 49–48	7–4	Wells Fargo Center		
13	Saturday	July 7	3:00 PM EDT	at Albany Empire	L 57–71	7–5	Times Union Center		

=== Playoffs ===
Round	Day	Date	Kickoff	Opponent	Result	Location
Semifinal #1	Sunday	July 15	6:00 PM EDT	Baltimore Brigade	L 45–57	Wells Fargo Center
Semifinal #2	Friday	July 20	7:00 PM EDT	at Baltimore Brigade	L 41–53	Royal Farms Arena
