= Douglas McNeil =

American gridiron football player (born 1988)

No. 8, 9, 3, 18, 16
- Position: Wide receiver

Personal information
- Born: July 22, 1988 (age 38); Baltimore, Maryland, U.S.
- Listed height: 6 ft 3 in (1.91 m)
- Listed weight: 200 lb (91 kg)

Career information
- High school: New Town (Owings Mills, Maryland)
- College: Bowie State
- NFL draft: 2013: undrafted

Career history
- Portland Thunder (2014); Denver Broncos (2014)*; Seattle Seahawks (2014–2015)*; BC Lions (2016)*; Albany Empire (2018); Baltimore Brigade (2018); Washington Valor (2018–2019); Saskatchewan Roughriders (2019)*; FCF Wild Aces (2021)
- * Offseason or practice squad member only

Awards and highlights
- ArenaBowl champion (2018)

Career AFL statistics
- Receptions: 91
- Receiving yards: 1,158
- Receiving touchdowns: 33
- Total tackles: 10
- Stats at ArenaFan.com
- Stats at CFL.ca

Douglas McNeil III (born July 22, 1988) is an American former professional football wide receiver. He attended Virginia Tech, James Madison University and Bowie State University and was a member of their football team. Over his three-year career at Bowie State, he made 84 receptions for 1,407 yards and 11 touchdowns.

== Professional career ==
=== Portland Thunder ===
In November 2013, McNeil signed with the Portland Thunder. According to the AFL, McNeil stands at 6 feet 3 inches (1.91 m) and weighs 200 pounds (91 kg).

=== Denver Broncos ===
On October 28, 2014, McNeil was signed to the Broncos' practice squad as an undrafted free agent. On November 18, 2014, he was released.

=== Seattle Seahawks ===
McNeil was signed to the practice squad of the Seattle Seahawks on December 23, 2014. On February 4, 2015, he re-signed with Seattle. On September 5, 2015, he was waived. On November 18, 2015, he was re-signed to the practice squad.

On December 3, 2015, the Seattle Seahawks released McNeil from their practice squad. On December 9, 2015 McNeil was put back onto the Seattle Seahawks practice squad.

On September 3, 2016, McNeil was released by the Seahawks as part of final roster cuts.

=== BC Lions ===
On September 19, 2016, McNeil was signed to the BC Lions practice squad.

=== Albany Empire ===
On March 21, 2018, McNeil was assigned to the Albany Empire. On May 7, 2018, he was placed on recallable reassignment.

=== Baltimore Brigade ===
On May 23, 2018, McNeil was assigned to the Baltimore Brigade. On May 31, 2018, McNeil was placed on recallable reassignment.

=== Washington Valor ===
On June 27, 2018, McNeil was assigned to the Washington Valor.

=== Saskatchewan Roughriders ===
McNeil signed with the Saskatchewan Roughriders on January 30, 2019. He was later released on May 10, 2019.

=== Fan Controlled Football ===
On February 10, 2021, McNeil was drafted by the Wild Aces of Fan Controlled Football.
