= Rod Windsor =

American football player (born 1985)

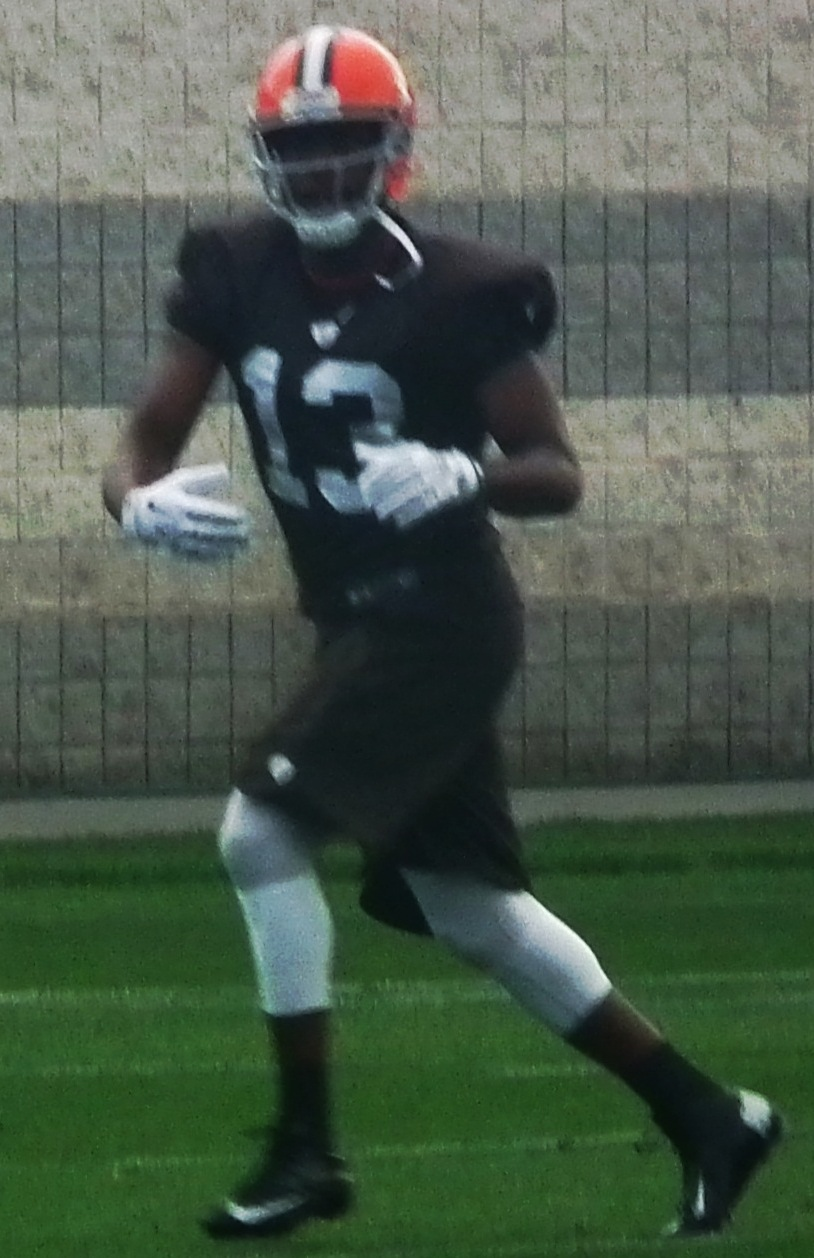
- Windsor with the Cleveland Browns in 2012

No. 1, 16, 13
- Position: Wide receiver

Personal information
- Born: April 24, 1985 (age 41); Bessemer, Alabama, U.S.
- Listed height: 6 ft 2 in (1.88 m)
- Listed weight: 210 lb (95 kg)

Career information
- High school: Lanier (Bessemer)
- College: Western New Mexico
- NFL draft: 2008: undrafted

Career history
- Rio Grande Valley Dorados (2009); Arizona Rattlers (2010); Sacramento Mountain Lions (2010); Cleveland Browns (2010)*; Buffalo Bills (2010)*; Cleveland Browns (2011)*; Arizona Rattlers (2011); Cleveland Browns (2011–2012); Arizona Rattlers (2013–2016); Washington Valor (2018); Baltimore Brigade (2019)
- * Offseason or practice squad member only

Awards and highlights
- 3× ArenaBowl champion (2013, 2014, 2018); ArenaBowl MVP (2013); 3× First-team All-Arena (2010, 2011, 2014); 3× Second-team All-Arena (2013, 2015, 2016); AFL Rookie of the Year (2010); af2 Offensive Player of the Year (2009); af2 Rookie of the Year (2009)

Career AFL statistics
- Receptions: 867
- Receiving yards: 10,898
- Receiving touchdowns: 256
- Rushing yards: 269
- Rushing touchdowns: 13
- Stats at ArenaFan.com
- Stats at Pro Football Reference

Rodrickus Windsor (born April 24, 1985) is an American former professional football player who was a wide receiver in the Arena Football League (AFL). He played college football for the Western New Mexico Mustangs.

== College career ==
Windsor began his college career at Garden City Community College in Garden City, Kansas before transferring to Western New Mexico University as a quarterback. As a junior, he led his team in both passing (1,361) and rushing (886) yards and a 118.61 passer rating before reluctantly switching to wide receiver for his senior season. In his only collegiate season as a wide receiver, caught 81 passes for 1,118 yards and six touchdowns.

== Professional career ==
=== 2009 ===
Windsor spent the 2009 af2 season with the Rio Grande Valley Dorados after the Arena Football League (AFL) filed for bankruptcy, catching 184 passes for 2,364 yards and 59 TDs in 15 games. He was named the Offensive Player of the Year and the Rookie of the Year.

=== 2010 ===
Windsor followed that success by playing the 2010 season with the Arizona Rattlers of the AFL, where he was named the AFL's Rookie of the Year after recording 193 catches for 2,372 yards and 47 touchdowns.

After the Rattlers season, Windsor was signed by the Sacramento Mountain Lions of the United Football League on August 22, 2010. He had 25 catches for 379 yards, good for 5th and 3rd in the league respectively, and tied for the league lead with 3 receiving touchdowns.

Windsor was signed by the Cleveland Browns to their practice squad on December 3, 2010, where he spent one week before being released.

Windsor was subsequently signed by the Buffalo Bills to their practice squad on December 30, 2010, where he finished the season.

=== 2011 ===
Windsor signed a futures contract with the Browns on January 19, 2011.

In response to the 2011 NFL lockout, Windsor went back to the AFL and signed with the Rattlers, where he caught 156 passes for 1,830 yards and 36 touchdowns. As with the 2010 season, he was again voted to the first-team All-Arena team.

After the lockout, he returned to the Browns where he spent the 2011 preseason catching 5 receptions, 83 yards and a touchdown. He was waived during the final round of cuts. He was re-signed to the practice squad, where he spent the first 15 weeks before being promoted to active roster on December 22, 2011. He did not dress the final two games of the season.

=== 2012 ===
Windsor spent the 2012 preseason with the Browns, catching 5 balls for 51 yards and a touchdown. He was released during final cuts on August 31, 2012; however, he was re-signed to the practice squad on October 10, 2012.

=== 2013–2016 ===
After not re-signing with the Browns, Windsor returned to the Rattlers. In 2013, Windsor was named second-team All-Arena, helping the Rattlers return to the ArenaBowl. The Rattlers defeated the Philadelphia Soul 48–39, with Windsor earning ArenaBowl XXVI MVP honors with 10 receptions for 145 yards. He retired after the 2016 season.

=== 2018 ===
On March 31, 2018, Windsor was assigned to the AFL's Washington Valor.

=== 2019 ===
Windsor was assigned to the Baltimore Brigade of the AFL on July 19, 2019.

== Coaching career ==
After his playing career, Windsor spent time as an assistant coach with the Rattlers. He was the offensive coordinator for the Northern Arizona Wranglers from 2022 to 2024. He served as the associate head coach and offensive coordinator of the Bay Area Panthers in 2025. Windsor began the 2026 season as the offensive coordinator for the Orlando Pirates. He was promoted to head coach on April 11, 2026, after Rob Keefe stepped down.
