= Omarr Smith =

American football player and coach (born 1977)

Morgan State Bears
- Title: Defensive pass game coordinator & cornerbacks coach

Personal information
- Born: April 7, 1977 (age 49); Chicago, Illinois, U.S.
- Listed height: 5 ft 9 in (1.75 m)
- Listed weight: 186 lb (84 kg)

Career information
- Position: Defensive back (No. 14)
- High school: Bishop Montgomery (Torrance, California)
- College: San Jose State
- NFL draft: 1999: undrafted

Career history

Playing
- San Jose SaberCats (2000–2002); Tampa Bay Storm (2003); San Jose SaberCats (2004–2008)

Coaching
- Whittier (2004) Defensive backs coach; Arkansas Twisters (2009) Defensive backs coach; Arizona Rattlers (2010–2013) Defensive coordinator; San Jose SaberCats (2014–2015) Assistant head coach & offensive coordinator; Los Angeles KISS (2016) Head coach; Baltimore Brigade (2017–2019) Head coach; Morgan State (2020–2021) Defensive backs coach; Morgan State (2022–present) Defensive pass game coordinator & cornerbacks coach

Awards and highlights
- 7× ArenaBowl champion (2002, 2003, 2004, 2007, 2012, 2013, 2015); First-team All-Arena (2004); Second-team All-Arena (2003); AFL Coach of the Year (2018); NET10 Assistant Coach of the Year (2013); Arena Football Hall of Fame inductee (2014)

Career AFL statistics
- Tackles: 475
- Pass breakups: 88
- Forced fumbles: 8
- Fumbles recovered: 8
- Interceptions: 35
- Stats at ArenaFan.com

Head coaching record
- Regular season: 25–29 (.463)
- Postseason: 2–5 (.286)
- Career: 27–34 (.443)

Omarr Ali Hasan Smith (born April 7, 1977) is an American football coach and former defensive back. He played professionally for the San Jose SaberCats of the Arena Football League (AFL), and collegiately at San Jose State.

In his career, Smith played for the SaberCats twice, from 2000–2002 and 2004–2008. He also played one year (2003) for the Tampa Bay Storm. He served as defensive coordinator with the rival Arizona Rattlers for three years (winning two championships). Smith has won seven total ArenaBowl championships as a player (4) and assistant coach (3); this ties the legendary Tim Marcum, who won seven as a head coach, for the most in AFL history. Smith was the head coach of the Los Angeles KISS and Baltimore Brigade of the AFL.

== Early life ==
Smith attended Bishop Montgomery High School in Torrance, California. While there, he lettered in football, basketball and track. He was a three-time all-league and two-time all-area grid choice.

== College career ==
Smith played four years at San Jose State University and had 13 career interceptions, the second-most in school history. He joined the team as a walk-on in 1995 and was assigned to cover Keyshawn Johnson in his first collegiate start. He led San Jose State with nine passes broken up in 1996 and 16 in 1997. He tied for second in the nation in 1997 with seven interceptions and tied a school record with three interceptions against the University of Hawaiʻi. Smith returned 22 punts for 246 yards and was the only player in Division I-A to rank in the top-30 in both interceptions and punt returns. He had an 84-yard touchdown return at UTEP in 1997 and an 88-yard punt return for a touchdown against Fresno State in 1998. Smith had 74 tackles as a sophomore, third-most on the team, and ended his career with 182 career tackles.

== Professional career ==
=== 2000 ===
In the 2000 Arena Football League season, Smith played in eight games at Wide receiver/Defensive back as a rookie. He posted 16 tackles, five passes broken up and five receptions for 48 yards. All five receptions on the season came in two games. He made his AFL debut with two tackles against the Houston Thunderbears. Had his first career reception and totaled two for the game with two pass break-ups against the Los Angeles Avengers. He recorded 2.5 tackles (a tackle for a loss) and a season-high three pass break-ups against the New England Sea Wolves. Smith had three receptions for 32 yards at the Grand Rapids Rampage. He recorded a season-high five solo tackles on the road against the Avengers.

=== 2001 ===
In the 2001 Arena Football League season, Smith was one of just four players to participate in all 14 games that season. He recorded a team-leading four interceptions and was fourth with 37 tackles earning team defensive MVP honors. He returned his first career interception 45-yards for his first career touchdown against the Arizona Rattlers. Smith missed a portion of the game after taking a knee to the helmet in Houston. He had his first catch of the season against the Oklahoma Wranglers. He had his second career interception and returned a blocked extra point attempt for the first two-point defensive point after try in league history at the New York Dragons. Smith made his first-career start at defensive specialist (DS) intercepting an Andy Kelly pass late in the game, leading to a game-tying field goal in a game that the San Jose SaberCats won in overtime against the Nashville Kats. He recorded career-highs of four catches for 86 yards and added his fourth career interception against the Florida Bobcats. Smith had the first two missed field goal returns of his career against the Thunderbears..

==== 2001 playoffs ====
Smith played in both San Jose playoff games. He appeared in his first AFL playoff game replacing the injured Anthony Cobbs at DS against the Rattlers. He recorded 5.5 tackles and a pass break-up in Nashville.

=== 2002 ===
In the 2002 Arena Football League season, Smith played in all 14 games for a second straight season. He earned ArenaBowl XVI game Ironman honors. He set single-season career-highs with 15 receptions for 234 yards finishing fifth on the team. He finished second on team with 49.5 tackles and eight passes broken up. Smith started at DS and recorded a career-high 8.5 tackles and matched his career-best with seven solo tackles at the Tampa Bay Storm. He had his first catch of the season against the Georgia Force. He was named the Ironman of the Game against the Los Angeles Avengers after recording two catches for 43 yards and a touchdown and five tackles along with a pass break up. He had his fifth career interception, and second returned for a touchdown on the road against the Orlando Predators. Smith recorded a career-long 37-yard reception on the road against the Buffalo Destroyers. He had the 20th reception of his career in Los Angeles. He was named Ironman of the Game after recording a 34-yard touchdown catch, his sixth career interception, and five tackles and two pass break ups against the Chicago Rush. Smith recorded a season-high three receptions against the Indiana Firebirds.

==== 2002 playoffs ====
He caught three passes for 37 yards and had an interception for game Ironman against the Predators. Smith started ArenaBowl XVI and was named the game's Ironman after rushing twice for nine yards, catching four passes for 34 yards and totaling five tackles, an interception and a fumble recovery against the Rattlers.

=== 2003 ===
In the 2003 Arena Football League season, Smith started all 16 games at DS for the Storm. He led the team with 88.5 tackles, eight interceptions and 18 pass broken up to earn second-team All-AFL honors. He had an interception in four straight games. Smith equaled his career-high with seven solo tackles and recorded an interception in his first game with the Storm against the Carolina Cobras. He had a career-high two fumble recoveries on the road against the Las Vegas Gladiators. He matched a career-high with seven solo tackles against the Detroit Fury. Smith recorded the ninth and 10th interceptions of his career with his first ever two-interception game in Indiana Firebirds. He had an interception, two passes broken up and six tackles, all against the Georgia Force. He was named game MVP after two pass break-ups and an interception in Carolina. He had his third career interception return touchdown against the Colorado Crush. He intercepted his eighth pass of the season giving him an interception in four straight games on the road against the New York Dragons.

=== 2004 ===
Smith re-signed with the San Jose SaberCats on November 7, 2003.

In the 2004 Arena Football League season, Smith, returning to San Jose, played in 15 games at Defensive Specialist earning first-team All-AFL honors, and became just the fourth player in team history with 100 solo tackles. He led the team with 83 total tackles (71 solo). He tied for first in the AFL with a career-high nine interceptions. He was the team leader and tied for fourth in the AFL with 14 passes broken up and 23 passes defended. Smith was named the AFL's Defensive Player of the Week (Week One). He set career-highs with five assisted tackles and five pass break-ups on the road against the Detroit Fury. Smith was inactive with a hamstring injury, the only game he missed all season, on the road against the New York Dragons. He recorded the 100th solo tackle of his San Jose career against the Crush. He was named the Defensive Player of the Game after returning an interception 48-yards for a touchdown against the Las Vegas Gladiators. Smith moved into fifth place on team's all-time list with his 11th career San Jose interception on the road against the Dallas Desperados. He was named Defensive Player of the Game after recording an interception in his third straight game against the Chicago Rush. He recorded his single-season career-high ninth interception on the road against the Gladiators.

==== 2004 playoffs ====
In the 2004 playoffs, Smith won his third straight championship. He started all 3 games at DS. He set a team single-game playoff record for total tackles (10.5) and solo tackles (10) in ArenaBowl XVIII.

=== 2005 ===
In the 2005 Arena Football League season, Smith started at DS for the first three games of the season before sustaining a season-ending knee injury. He recorded 20.5 tackles (18 solo), an interception and four passes broken up for the season. He became just the third player in team history to record 200 career tackles. Smith recorded his 16th career interception as a SaberCat (24th overall) along with two pass break-ups to earn Defensive Player of the Game against the Gladiators. His season ended when he left the game in the fourth quarter after sustaining a knee injury on the road against the New Orleans VooDoo. The SaberCats placed him on Injured Reserve (IR) on February 17, 2005 with a ruptured patellar tendon missing the remainder of the season.

=== 2006 ===
In the 2006 Arena Football League season, Smith returned from a serious knee injury and played and started 11 games at DS, including the final 10 regular season games. He began the season on injured reserve recovering from the knee surgery. He totaled 41 tackles (38 solo), three passes broken up and two forced fumbles. He had three interceptions on the season giving him 27 in his career and 19 as a SaberCat. Smith returned two of his interceptions for touchdowns giving him the team's career lead. He started at DS in his first game since sustaining a knee injury in New Orleans on February 13, 2005, on the road against the Arizona Rattlers. He returned to the lineup after being inactive for three games starting at DS against the Los Angeles Avengers. Against the Tampa Bay Storm, he recorded his 25th career interception which he returned 16 yards for a touchdown, his fifth career interception returned for a touchdown, to earn Defensive Player of the Game. Smith recorded his 18th interception of his San Jose career (26th overall) moving into fourth place on the team's career list, against the Austin Wranglers. He broke a tie with Greg Hopkins for sole possession of 20th place on the AFL's all-time career interception list with his 27th that he returned 42 yards for a touchdown, his fifth career interception return for a touchdown with San Jose (sixth overall) giving him the team's all-time lead, against the Colorado Crush.

==== 2006 playoffs ====
Smith started both games at DS. He was named Defensive Player of the Game after his fifth career playoff interception (third as a SaberCat), five tackles and a pass broken up against the Rattlers. He had 3.5 tackles, a pass break-up and a fumble recovery against the Rush.

=== 2007 ===
In the 2007 Arena Football League season, Smith started all 16 games at DB. He set team season records for most solo tackles (79) and total tackles (87.5). He tied Pat McGuirk for second on the team's career interception list with 24. Smith recorded 17 pass break-ups for the year to move into third place on the team's career list with 55. He recorded his 400th career total tackle, 365th career solo tackle, 100th career assisted tackle and 100th defended pass. He returned two of his five interceptions for touchdowns giving him eight for his career. He had the seventh longest fumble return in AFL history with 47-yards for a touchdown in a game against the Orlando Predators. He recorded his 300th career solo tackle on the road against the Los Angeles Avengers. He recorded his 350th career total tackle on the road against the Force. Smith recorded his 20th career interception as a SaberCat, 28th overall, against the Crush. He recorded his 29th career interception and 330th career solo tackle, against the Avengers. He played in his 90th career regular season AFL game at the Arizona Rattlers on May 5, 2007. He returned his 30th career interception 50-yards for a touchdown, the third longest return in team history, against the Gladiators. Smith moved into a tie for 17th place all-time with his 31st career interception earning Defensive Player of the Game honors against the Grand Rapids Rampage. He recorded his 400th career total tackle, on the road against the Nashville Kats. He had two pass break-ups, giving him 100 passes defended for his career, on the road at the Utah Blaze. Smith had his 24th career interception as a SaberCat, tying Pat McGuirk for second place on team's career list, and returned it 36-yards for a touchdown, his eighth career interception returned for a touchdown and a team record seventh with San Jose, against the Arizona Rattlers. He recorded a season-high three pass break-ups in Las Vegas.

==== 2007 playoffs ====
Smith started all three playoff games. He recorded nine tackles, his sixth career playoff interception and two pass break ups and earned Defensive Player of the Game in the SaberCats ArenaBowl XXI win over the Columbus Destroyers.

=== 2008 ===
In the 2008 Arena Football League season, Smith began the season tied for second on the team's all-time interceptions list with 24. His 32 career interceptions were good for a 16th place tie on the AFL's chart. Smith posted three interceptions in the American Conference championship game, setting a SaberCats record for postseason play; this matched his interception total from the regular season.

== Coaching career ==
=== College ===
Smith spent time as the defensive backs coach at Whittier College and Phoenix College.

=== Arkansas Twisters ===
Smith was the defensive backs coach of the Arkansas Twisters of the af2 in 2009.

=== Arizona Rattlers ===
Smith served as the defensive coordinator for the Arizona Rattlers from 2010 to 2013.

=== San Jose SaberCats ===
In November 2013, Smith joined the SaberCats as assistant head coach. He was the assistant head coach from 2014 to 2015. He was also the team's offensive coordinator in 2014.

=== Los Angeles KISS ===
On November 4, 2015, Smith was named the head coach of the Los Angeles KISS. The team folded after the 2016 season.

=== Baltimore Brigade ===
On December 14, 2016, Smith was named the Baltimore Brigade's first head coach.

=== Head coaching record ===
Team	Year	Regular season				Postseason			
Team	Year	Won	Lost	Win %	Finish	Won	Lost	Win %	Result
LA	2016	7	9	.438	2nd in NC	0	1	.000	Lost to Cleveland Gladiators in Conference Semifinals
BAL	2017	4	10	.286	4th in AFL	0	1	.000	Lost to Philadelphia Soul in Semifinals
BAL	2018	7	5	.583	2nd in AFL	2	1	.667	Lost to Washington Valor in Arena Bowl XXXI
BAL	2019	7	5	.583	4th in AFL	0	2	.000	Lost to Albany Empire in Semifinals
Total		25	29	.463		2	5	.286	

== Personal life ==
One of Smith's cousins is former San Francisco 49ers safety Tim McDonald.

Smith has coached defensive backs at Whittier College. He has expressed a desire for a post-football career in broadcasting. He has covered various high school football and volleyball games and some junior college football games in Southern California. Smith enjoys bowling and has partnered with teammates for a weekly outing during the season.
