= Brandon Collins =

American gridiron football player (born 1989)

No. 5, 15
- Position: Wide receiver

Personal information
- Born: April 21, 1989 (age 37); Austin, Texas, U.S.
- Listed height: 5 ft 11 in (1.80 m)
- Listed weight: 180 lb (82 kg)

Career information
- High school: Brenham (Brenham, Texas)
- College: Southeastern Louisiana
- NFL draft: 2012: undrafted

Career history
- New York Giants (2012)*; Hamilton Tiger-Cats (2014)*; San Jose SaberCats (2015); Spokane Shock (2015)*; San Jose SaberCats (2015); Los Angeles KISS (2016); Baltimore Brigade (2017–2019)
- * Offseason or practice squad member only

Awards and highlights
- ArenaBowl champion (2015)

Career AFL statistics
- Receptions: 89
- Receiving yards: 1,091
- Receiving TDs: 17
- Tackles: 10.5
- Return yards: 184
- Stats at ArenaFan.com
- Stats at Pro Football Reference

Brandon Collins (born April 21, 1989) is an American former football wide receiver.

== Early life ==
Collins was born in Austin and his family quickly moved to San Angelo, TX before moving to Bryan and then finally Brenham. His parents were coaches and he was an honor roll student in high school. He played high school football at Brenham High School where he was a three-year letterman and a 4A all-state wide receiver and an all-Greater Houston safety. He was also an all-district point guard in basketball and a regional qualifier in the 110 hurdles, the 300 hurdles and the long jump.

His cousin Shaud Williams played for the Buffalo Bills.

== College career ==
Collins started his college career at the University of Texas. In 2007, he played in 7 games as a freshman and had 2 special teams tackles and the next year he played in 12 games with 3 starts and caught 35 passes for 430 yards and 3 touchdowns, including a 103-yard receiving game against Texas A&M. He played in the 2009 Fiesta Bowl where he 7 receptions for 60 yards and Texas won. He missed the 2009 season because he was academically ineligible. Then, in early 2010 he was dismissed from the Texas team when he was arrested for aggravated robbery.

He transferred to Southeastern Louisiana University in 2010. In his first season at Southeastern Louisiana he played in all 11 games with 8 starts and was second on the team with 56 catches for a team-high 875 yards (15.6-yard avg.) and 4 touchdowns. He also returned 13 punts for 88 yards. In 2011, he led the team in receptions (61) and receiving TDs (5) and was 2nd in receiving yards (746) while also recording 37 yards on 4 carries and leading the team with 21 kick off returns for 232 yards.

== Professional career ==
=== New York Giants ===
Collins was signed on May 14, 2012, by the New York Giants as an undrafted free agent. On September 4 he was signed to the Giants’ practice squad, but his contract was terminated on Sept. 10 and was not re-signed.

On January 4, 2013, he was re-signed to a reserve/futures contract, but on June 24, 2013, he was suspended without pay for the first four games of the 2013 regular season for violating the NFL policy and program regarding substances of abuse. On August 25, 2013, he was cut by the Giants.

=== Hamilton Tiger-Cats ===
In February 2014 he was signed by the Hamilton Tiger-Cats but was released before the season started.

=== San Jose Sabercats ===
In October 2014, Collins was assigned the San Jose SaberCats of the Arena Football League. Before the season started he was placed on inactive reserve and then a few weeks later moved to league suspension. He returned to the SaberCats in late April, after the season had started, and played in his first game on May 9. He had two receptions for 47 yards and a touchdown in that game and played in another game before he was placed on the injured reserve. On June 1, 2015, he was put onto reassignment.

On June 2, 2015, Collins was claimed by the Spokane Shock. Two days later, he was traded back to the SaberCats. He played in a game on June 13 and then was put back on injured reserve on June 19, 2015. He was reactivated from injured reserve on August 12, before the first playoff game, and then returned to it on August 21. The SaberCats went on to win ArenaBowl XXVIII.

In the offseason the SaberCats exercised the league rookie option and signed him to a one-year contract.

=== Los Angeles Kiss ===
A few weeks after being signed by the SaberCats, the league announced that the team would cease operations and in December 2015, Collins was assigned to the Los Angeles KISS. He was "in the middle of a breakout season" in 2016, including making the "AFL highlight of the game" in week 1, with the KISS when an ACL tear sidelined him for the rest of the season.

=== Baltimore Brigade ===
From 2017 to 2019 he played for the Baltimore Brigade. In 2017, he joined the team late but started two of the last six game and scored two touchdowns in their one playoff game that year.

In 2018, he helped them reach ArenaBowl XXXI which they lost to the Washington Valor. In that game he scored 3 TDs but was forced out of the game after an injury.

He had a standout season in 2019, finishing in the top 10 in receptions, receiving yards and receiving TDs, but missed the last game and the playoffs with another injury. The Arena Football League shut down following the 2019 season at which point Collins was the Brigade's career leader in receiving yards, points and touchdowns.
