= Benji McDowell =

American football player and coach (born 1985)

Profile
- Position: Defensive end

Personal information
- Born: June 19, 1986 (age 40)
- Listed height: 6 ft 1 in (1.85 m)
- Listed weight: 290 lb (132 kg)

Career information
- College: Lenoir–Rhyne
- NFL draft: 2007: undrafted

Career history

Playing
- Alabama Vipers (2008–2010); Georgia Force (2011–2012); Alabama Hammers (2012); New Orleans VooDoo (2015)

Coaching
- Chase High School, NC (2010–2012) (Defensive Line); University of Georgia (2014–2015) (Intern (Defensive Line, Strength and Conditioning}); Tampa Bay Storm (2016) (Defensive coordinator); Washington Valor (2017–2018) (Defensive coordinator); Washington Valor (2018–2019)

Awards and highlights
- ArenaBowl champion (2018); PIFL champion (2013); First-team All-SAC (2005–2006)

Career AFL statistics
- Tackles: 54.5
- Sacks: 8
- Force fumbles: 2
- Fumble recoveries: 3
- Stats at ArenaFan.com

Head coaching record
- Regular season: 9–11
- Postseason: 2–3
- Career: 11–14

Benjamin McDowell (born June 19, 1986) is an American football coach and former player. He was the head coach of the Washington Valor of the Arena Football League (AFL).

== College career ==
McDowell attended Lenoir–Rhyne, where he was a first-team All-South Atlantic Conference player in 2005–06.

== Coaching career ==
When the Washington Valor fired Dean Cokinos on May 16, 2018, after a 0–7 start to the 2018 season, McDowell was named the interim head coach. Under McDowell, the Valor finished the season with a 2–3 record and the last place position for the playoffs of four AFL teams that qualified. The Valor then upset the top-seeded Albany Empire in a home-and-home series with the greater aggregate score. The Valor then defeated the Baltimore Brigade 69–55 in ArenaBowl XXXI. After the season ended, McDowell's interim tag was removed and was named the permanent head coach for the 2019 season.

=== Head coaching record ===
==== AFL ====
Team	Year	Regular season				Postseason			
Team	Year	Won	Lost	Win %	Finish	Won	Lost	Win %	Result
WAS	2018	2	6	.250	4th in AFL	2	1	.667	Won ArenaBowl XXXI
WAS	2019	7	5	.583	2nd in AFL	0	2	.000	Lost to Philadelphia Soul in Semifinals
Total		9	11	.450		2	3	.400	
