= James Gordon (American football) =

American football player (born 1991)

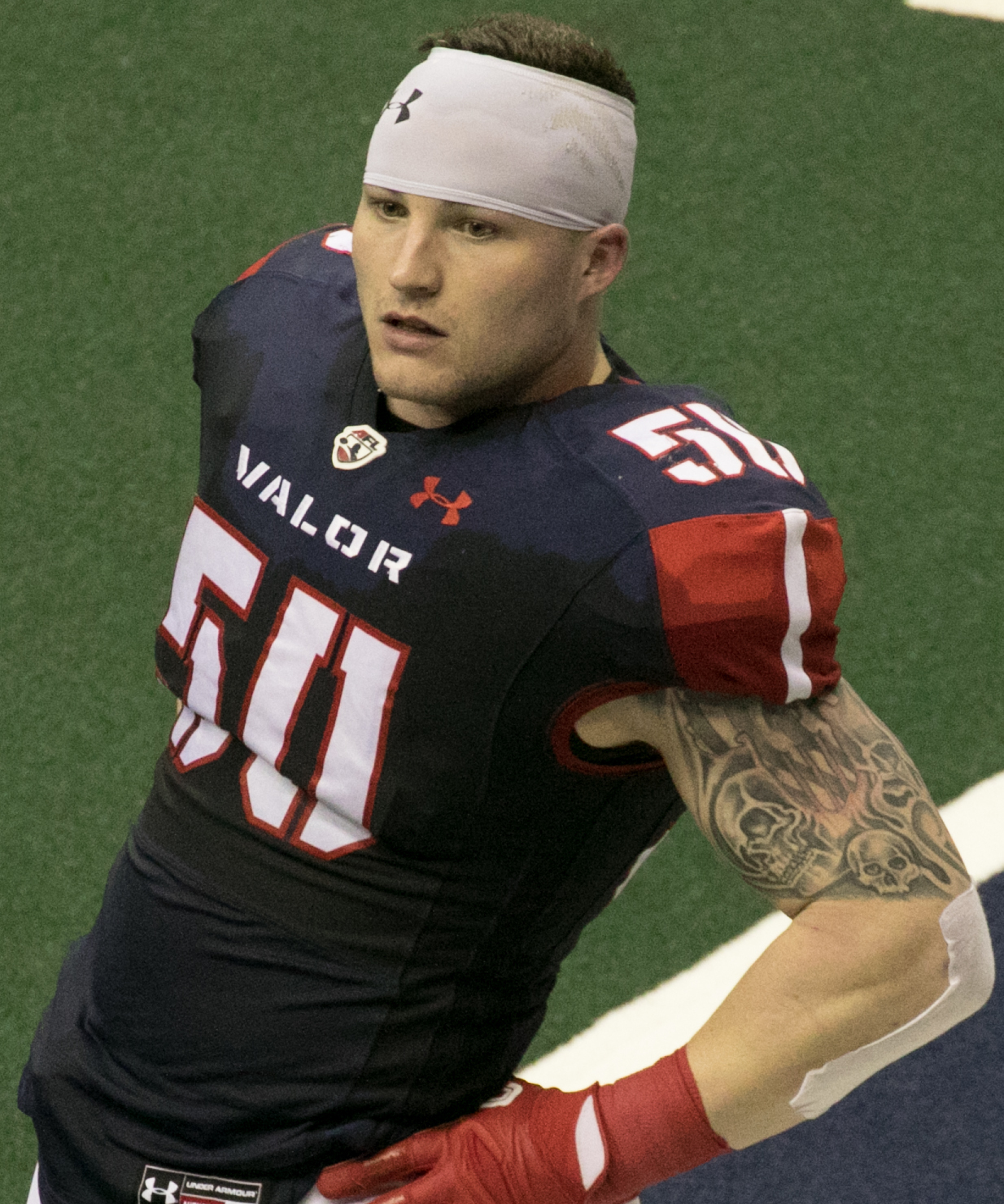
- Gordon with the Washington Valor in 2017

No. 50
- Position: Linebacker

Personal information
- Born: August 1, 1991 (age 35); Patchogue, New York, U.S.
- Listed height: 6 ft 2 in (1.88 m)
- Listed weight: 275 lb (125 kg)

Career information
- High school: Patchogue-Medford (NY)
- College: Buffalo
- NFL draft: 2014: undrafted

Career history
- Jacksonville Sharks (2015); Tampa Bay Storm (2016); Washington Valor (2017–2019)

Awards and highlights
- ArenaBowl champion (2018)

Career AFL statistics
- Tackles: 55.5
- Sacks: 4.5
- Forced Fumbles: 0
- Interceptions: 0
- Stats at ArenaFan.com

James "Jimmy" Gordon (born August 1, 1991) is an American former professional football linebacker who played in the Arena Football League (AFL) for the Jacksonville Sharks, Tampa Bay Storm, and Washington Valor.

== College career ==
Gordon committed to the University at Buffalo and played four years for the Buffalo Bulls football team at tight end.

== Professional career ==
Gordon signed with the Jacksonville Sharks for the 2015 Arena Football League season, converting from a tight end to play linebacker, a position he had not played since high school. He recorded 10 tackles before being placed on injured reserve to end the year. Gordon spent the 2016 Arena Football League season with the Tampa Bay Storm as the team's starting Mac linebacker, recording 33 tackles and 2 sacks on the season. On January 13, 2017, Gordon signed with the Washington Valor for the 2017 Arena Football League season. On April 1, 2019, Gordon was again assigned to the Valor.
