= Rodney Austin =

American football player (born 1988)

No. 74, 44
- Position: Offensive lineman

Personal information
- Born: December 4, 1988 (age 37); St. Louis, Missouri, U.S.
- Listed height: 6 ft 4 in (1.93 m)
- Listed weight: 311 lb (141 kg)

Career information
- High school: East Mecklenburg (Charlotte, North Carolina)
- College: Elon
- NFL draft: 2012: undrafted

Career history
- Detroit Lions (2012–2014); Baltimore Brigade (2018–2019)
- Stats at Pro Football Reference

Rodney Austin (born December 4, 1988) is an American former professional football player who was an offensive lineman for the Detroit Lions of the National Football League (NFL). He played college football for the Elon Phoenix and was signed by the Lions as an undrafted free agent after the 2012 NFL draft.

== College career ==
He played college football at Elon University.

== Professional career ==
He was signed by the Lions as an undrafted free agent in 2012. He was released on August 31, 2012, when the Lions established their final 53 roster but was signed to their practice squad the next day after he cleared waivers.

On April 21, 2015, Austin was released by the Detroit Lions.

on March 28, 2018, he was assigned to the Baltimore Brigade. On March 15, 2019, he was again assigned to the Brigade.

== Personal life ==
Rodney is an avid flag football player.
