= Chris Duvalt =

American gridiron football player (born 1987)

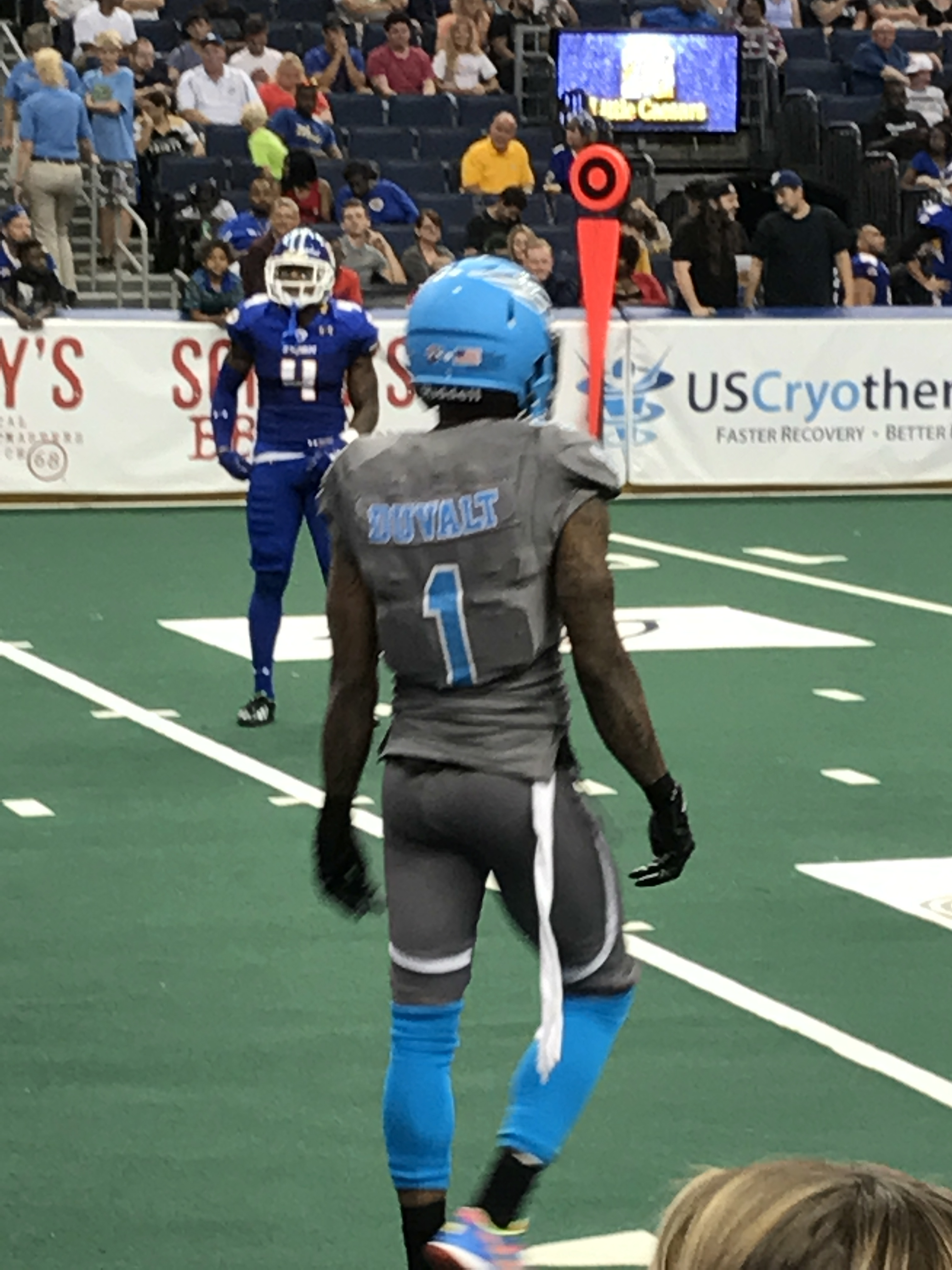
- Duvalt with the Philadelphia Soul in 2017

No. 15, 3, 17, 2, 1
- Position: Wide receiver

Personal information
- Born: December 12, 1987 (age 38); Lakeland, Florida, U.S.
- Listed height: 5 ft 10 in (1.78 m)
- Listed weight: 170 lb (77 kg)

Career information
- High school: Lake Gibson (Lakeland)
- College: Illinois
- NFL draft: 2010: undrafted

Career history
- Seattle Seahawks (2010)*; Orlando Predators (2011); New Orleans VooDoo (2012–2015); Hamilton Tiger-Cats (2012)*; Philadelphia Soul (2016–2017); Florida Tarpons (2018); Washington Valor (2018–2019)
- * Offseason or practice squad member only

Awards and highlights
- 3× ArenaBowl champion (2016, 2017, 2018); Second-team All-Arena (2018)

Career AFL statistics
- Receptions: 213
- Receiving yards: 2,614
- Receiving TDs: 50
- Return yards: 3,499
- Return TDs: 3
- Stats at ArenaFan.com

Darian Christopher Duvalt (born December 12, 1987) is an American former professional football player who was a wide receiver in the Arena Football League (AFL). He played college football for the Illinois Fighting Illini and attended Lake Gibson High School in Lakeland, Florida. He was a member of the Seattle Seahawks, Orlando Predators, New Orleans VooDoo, Hamilton Tiger-Cats, Philadelphia Soul, Florida Tarpons, and Washington Valor.

== Early life ==
Duvalt attended Lake Gibson High School where he played football and basketball.

College recruiting
Name	Hometown	School	Height	Weight	40^{‡}	Commit date
Chris Duvalt; DB	Lakeland, Florida	Lake Gibson High School	5 ft 10 in (1.78 m)	159 lb (72 kg)	4.50	Jan 20, 2006
Chris Duvalt; DB	Recruit ratings: Scout: Rivals: 247Sports: (75)					
Overall recruit ranking: Scout: 118 (DB) Rivals: 25 (DB), 49 (FL)
Note: In many cases, Scout, Rivals, 247Sports, On3, and ESPN may conflict in their listings of height and weight.; In these cases, the average was taken. ESPN grades are on a 100-point scale.; Sources: "Illinois Football Commitment List". Rivals.; "Illinois College Football Recruiting Commits". Scout.; "ESPN". ESPN.; "Scout.com Team Recruiting Rankings". Scout.; "2006 Team Ranking". Rivals.com.

== College career ==
On January 29, 2006, Duvalt committed to the University of Illinois Urbana-Champaign, where he played football for the Illinois Fighting Illini from 2006 to 2009. He was the team's starter his final year and a half and helped the Fighting Illini to 19 wins. He played in 42 games during his career including 15 starts at wide receiver. Duvalt started his career at Illinois as a defensive back, where he played 19 games primarily as a return specialist.

=== Statistics ===
Year	Team	Receiving					Tackles			Kickoff returns				
Year	Team	Att	Yards	Avg	Yds/G	TD	Solo	Ast	Total	Att	Yards	Avg	TD	Long
2006	Illinois	0	0	--	--	0	1	1	2	8	175	21.9	0	37
2007	Illinois	0	0	--	--	0	0	4	4	4	70	17.5	0	23
2008	Illinois	10	156	15.6	14.2	4	0	0	0	0	0	--	0	--
2009	Illinois	23	361	15.7	30.1	3	0	0	0	1	1	1.0	0	1
Career		33	517	15.7	22.5	7	1	5	6	13	246	18.9	0	37

== Professional career ==
Pre-draft measurables
Height	Weight	40-yard dash	10-yard split	20-yard split	20-yard shuttle	Three-cone drill	Vertical jump	Broad jump	Bench press
5 ft 10 in (1.78 m)	173 lb (78 kg)	4.52 s	1.63 s	2.70 s	4.47 s	6.70 s	36 in (0.91 m)	10 ft 00 in (3.05 m)	12 reps
All values from Illinois Pro Day

=== Seattle Seahawks ===
Duvalt signed as an undrafted free agent with the Seattle Seahawks in May 2010. About a week later, Duvalt was waived by the Seahawks.

=== Orlando Predators ===
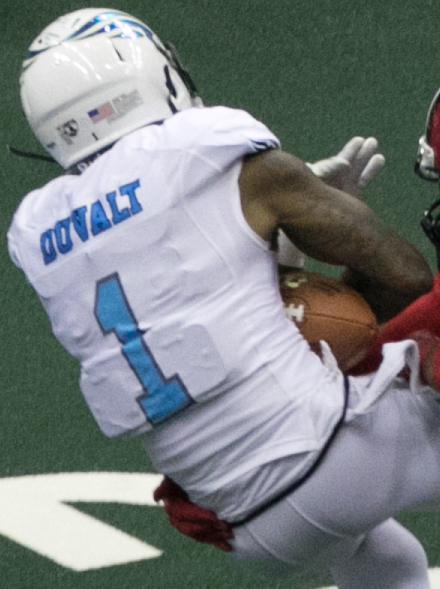
Duvalt in 2017

On November 18, 2010, Duvalt was assigned to the Orlando Predators. Duvalt was active for the first 6 games of the season before being placed on injured reserve April 28, 2011. He was activated on June 29, 2011, just in time for the Predators playoff game where they lost to the Jacksonville Sharks.

=== New Orleans VooDoo ===
Duvalt was assigned to the New Orleans VooDoo on September 30, 2011. December 20, 2011, Duvalt was placed on the other league exempt list. On June 25, 2012, Duvalt was activated from the other league exempt list. Duvalt performed well in limited time with the VooDoo in 2012. Duvalt was assigned to the VooDoo again on October 26, 2012. Just 7 games into the 2013 season, Duvalt was placed on injured reserve after tearing his ACL, ending his season. Duvalt missed a majority of the 2014 season, recovering from the ACL injury, but he returned Week 18 in a VooDoo victory over the Sharks. Duvalt was assigned to the VooDoo again on March 10, 2015. Duvalt posted career highs with 109 receptions, 1,265 and 23 touchdowns.

=== Hamilton Tiger-Cats ===
On April 16, 2012, Duvalt was officially added to the Hamilton Tiger-Cats roster. Duvalt played in two preseason games with the Tiger-Cats, but was cut before the season began.

=== Philadelphia Soul ===
On November 13, 2015, Duvalt was assigned to the Philadelphia Soul. On August 26, 2016, the Soul beat the Arizona Rattlers in ArenaBowl XXIX by a score of 56–42. On August 26, 2017, the Soul beat the Tampa Bay Storm in ArenaBowl XXX by a score of 44–40.

=== Florida Tarpons ===
On March 6, 2018, Duvalt signed with the Florida Tarpons.

=== Washington Valor ===
On March 21, 2018, Duvalt was assigned to the Washington Valor.
