= Kendall Montgomery =

American gridiron football player (born 1992)

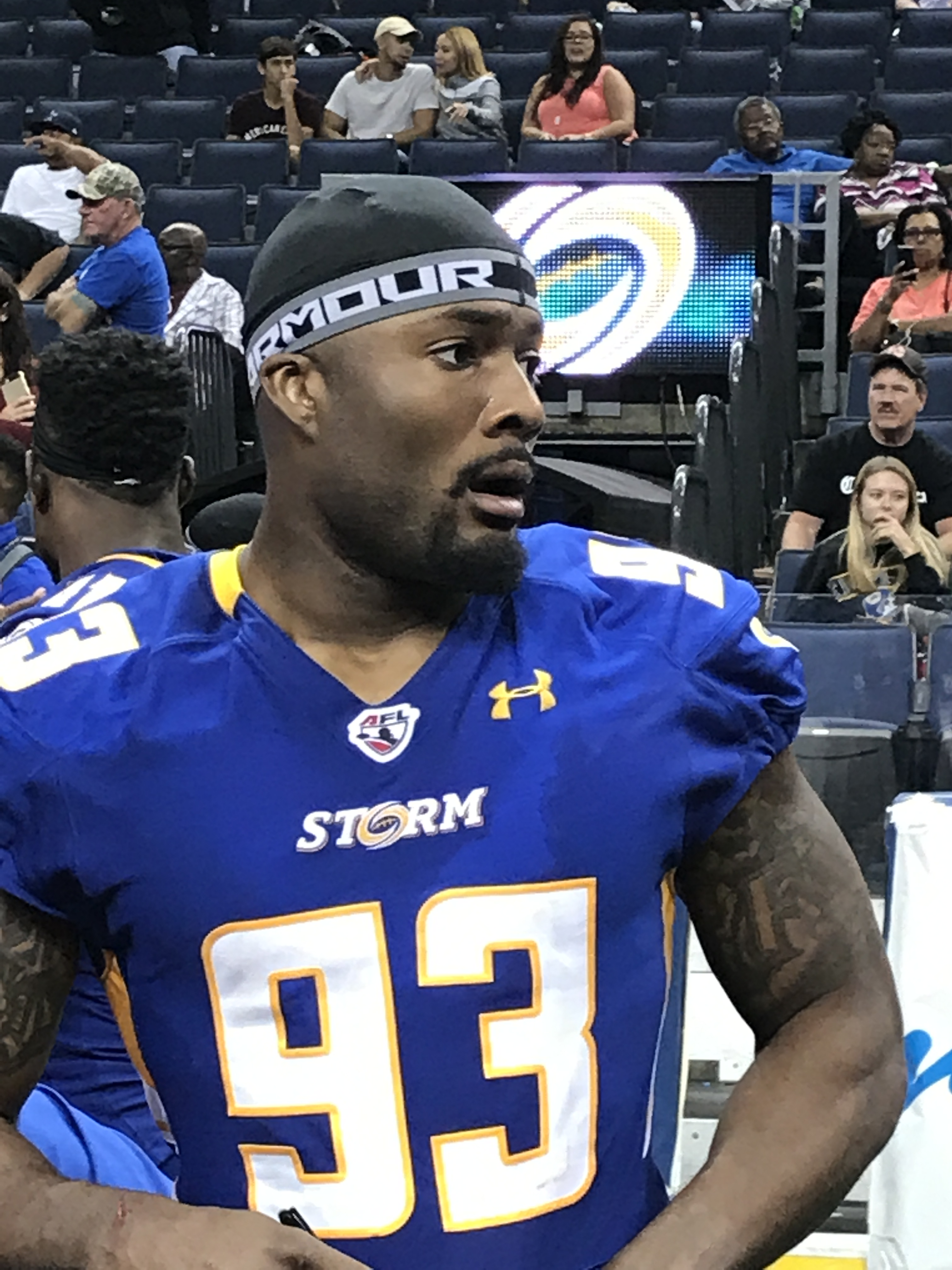
- Montomgery with the Tampa Bay Storm in 2017

No. 93
- Position: Defensive lineman

Personal information
- Born: July 27, 1992 (age 34); Miami, Florida, U.S.
- Listed height: 6 ft 6 in (1.98 m)
- Listed weight: 250 lb (113 kg)

Career information
- High school: Monsignor Pace (Miami Gardens, Florida)
- College: Bowling Green (2010–2014)
- NFL draft: 2015: undrafted

Career history
- Miami Dolphins (2015)*; Ottawa Redblacks (2016)*; Saskatchewan Roughriders (2016)*; Tampa Bay Storm (2017); Baltimore Brigade (2018)
- * Offseason or practice squad member only

Career AFL statistics
- Tackles: 9.5
- Sacks: 1
- Fumble recoveries: 1
- Stats at ArenaFan.com
- Stats at CFL.ca

Kendall Odell Montgomery (born July 27, 1992) is an American former football defensive lineman. He played college football at Bowling Green State University. He was a member of the Miami Dolphins, Ottawa Redblacks, Saskatchewan Roughriders, Tampa Bay Storm, and Baltimore Brigade.

== Early life ==
Montgomery attended Monsignor Pace High School in Miami Gardens, Florida.

College recruiting
| Name | Hometown | School | Height | Weight | 40^{‡} | Commit date |
|---|---|---|---|---|---|---|
| Kendall Montgomery; TE | Miami Gardens, Florida | Monsignor Pace School | 6 ft 6 in (1.98 m) | 226 lb (103 kg) | 4.90 | Jan 3, 2003 |
| Kendall Montgomery; TE | Recruit ratings: Scout: Rivals: 247Sports: ESPN: | | | | | |
Overall recruit ranking: Scout: 68 (TE) Rivals: 31 (TE), -- (FL)
Note: In many cases, Scout, Rivals, 247Sports, On3, and ESPN may conflict in their listings of height and weight.; In these cases, the average was taken. ESPN grades are on a 100-point scale.; Sources: "Bowling Green College Football Recruiting Commits". Scout.; "Scout.com Team Recruiting Rankings". Scout.; "2010 Team Ranking". Rivals.com.

== College career ==
Montgomery played for the Bowling Green Falcons from 2010 to 2014. Montgomery played in 50 games and helped the Falcons to 31 wins. He played in 44 games during his career, including 6 starts at tight end.

== Professional career ==
Pre-draft measurables
| Height | Weight | 40-yard dash | 10-yard split | 20-yard split | 20-yard shuttle | Three-cone drill | Vertical jump | Broad jump | Bench press |
|---|---|---|---|---|---|---|---|---|---|
| 6 ft 6 in (1.98 m) | 269 lb (122 kg) | 4.91 s | 1.76 s | 2.80 s | 4.60 s | 7.52 s | 33 in (0.84 m) | 9 ft 5 in (2.87 m) | 20 reps |
All values Bowling Green Pro Day

Montgomery signed with the Miami Dolphins as an undrafted free agent in May 2015. Montgomery played three preseason games for the Dolphins before he was released on August 30, 2015.

On February 19, 2016, Montgomery signed with the Ottawa Redblacks of the Canadian Football League. He was released on June 26, 2016.

Montgomery was signed to the Saskatchewan Roughriders' practice roster on October 18, 2016. He was released by the team on October 25, 2016.

On April 13, 2017, Montgomery was assigned to the Tampa Bay Storm of the Arena Football League (AFL). The Storm folded in December 2017.

On March 20, 2018, Montgomery was assigned to the AFL's Baltimore Brigade.
