= 2018 Albany Empire season =

2018 American football season

- Owner: Main owners: George Randolph Hearst III; Dan Nolan; Ed Swyer; Partner owners (with Philadelphia Soul): Ron Jaworski; Craig Spencer; Pete Ciarrocchi; Cosmo DeNicola; Martin E. Judge; Dick Vermeil; Marques Colston; Jahri Evans; Nicholas Giuffre; Philip Jaurigue; Stewart Anmuth; Gil Peter; Hal Brunson
- Head coach: Rob Keefe
- Home stadium: Times Union Center

Results
- Record: 8–4
- League place: 1st
- Playoffs: Eliminated in semifinals

The 2018 Albany Empire season was the first season for the franchise in the Arena Football League. The Empire play home games at the Times Union Center.

== Standings ==
2018 Arena Football League standings
Team	Overall			Points		Records			
Team	W	L	PCT	PF	PA	Home	Away	GB	STK
(#)-Albany Empire	8	4	.667	646	564	4–3	4–1	—	W3
Baltimore Brigade	7	5	.583	605	562	5–1	2–4	1	L3
Philadelphia Soul	7	5	.583	612	577	3-2	4-3	1	L1
Washington Valor	2	10	.167	482	642	1–5	1–5	6	W1

^{(#)} - clinched regular season title

== Roster ==
2018 Albany Empire roster
Quarterbacks: 4 Tommy Grady; 6 Kyle Rowley; 12 Mike Fafaul; Fullbacks: 9 Mykel Benson; Wide receivers: 81 Joe Hills; 7 Malachi Jones; 11 Collin Taylor; 18 Jordan Williams	Offensive linemen: 68 Ryan Cave; 75 Hayworth Hicks; 72 Bret Piekarski; 93 Moqut Ruffins; Defensive linemen: 3 Darryl Cato-Bishop; 99 Nick Seither; 91 Brandon Sesay; 50 Derrick Summers; 1 Joe Sykes	Linebackers: 13 Wesley Mauia; 8 Terence Moore; Defensive backs: 12 Arkeith Brown; 21 Marrio Norman; 5 Terrance Smith; 10 Varmah Sonie; Kickers: 19 Kenny Spencer	Injured reserve: -- Paul Browning WR (IR); 12 Mike Fafaul QB (IR); 24 Arthur Hobbs DB (IR); -- Erick McIntosh DB (IR); 14 Al Phillips DB (IR); 5 Brandon Stephens DB (IR); Other league exempt: currently vacant; League suspension: 45 Brian Brikowski DL (Susp.); 2 Greg Carr WR (Susp.); -- Julian Talley WR (Susp.); Refused to report: currently vacant; Inactive reserve: currently vacant; Recallable reassignment: currently vacant; rookies in italics Roster updated July 19, 2018; 23 Active, 9 Inactive → More rosters

== Staff ==
Albany Empire staff
Front office: Albany ownership group – George Randolph Hearst III; Albany ownership group – Daniel Nolan; Albany ownership group – Ed Swyer; Philadelphia ownership group – Craig A. Spencer; Philadelphia ownership group – Ron Jaworski; Philadelphia ownership group – Pete Ciarrocchi; Philadelphia ownership group – Cosmo DeNicola; Philadelphia ownership group – Martin E. Judge; Philadelphia ownership group – Marques Colston; Philadelphia ownership group – Dick Vermeil; Philadelphia ownership group – Nicholas Giuffre; Philadelphia ownership group – Jahri Evans; Philadelphia ownership group – Philip Jaurigue; Philadelphia ownership group – Stewart Anmuth; Philadelphia ownership group – Gil Peter; Philadelphia ownership group – Hal Brunson; President – John Adams; Director of operations – Chris Thompson	Coaches: Head coach – Rob Keefe; Assistant head coach – Les Moss; Offensive coordinator – Chris Thompson

== Schedule ==
=== Regular season ===
The 2018 regular season schedule was released on February 13, 2018.

Week	Day	Date	Kickoff	Opponent	Results		Location	Attendance
Week	Day	Date	Kickoff	Opponent	Score	Record	Location	Attendance
1	Saturday	April 14	7:00 PM EDT	Philadelphia Soul	L 35–56	0–1	Times Union Center	13,648
2	Bye							
3	Saturday	April 28	3:00 PM EDT	at Baltimore Brigade	L 49–52	0–2	Royal Farms Arena	4,796
4	Saturday	May 5	7:30 PM EDT	Washington Valor	W 47–23	1–2	Times Union Center	10,065
5	Friday	May 11	7:00 PM EDT	at Washington Valor	W 53–42	2–2	Capital One Arena	9,037
6	Saturday	May 19	6:00 PM EDT	at Philadelphia Soul	W 41–36	3–2	Wells Fargo Center	9,715
7	Saturday	May 26	6:00 PM EDT	Washington Valor	W 48–21	4–2	Times Union Center	7,847
8	Saturday	June 2	7:00 PM EDT	Baltimore Brigade	W 61–53	5–2	Times Union Center	8,057
9	Saturday	June 9	7:00 PM EDT	Baltimore Brigade	L 56–59	5–3	Times Union Center	8,767
10	Saturday	June 16	6:00 PM EDT	Philadelphia Soul	L 74–75	5–4	Times Union Center	9,534
11	Saturday	June 23	7:30 PM EDT	at Baltimore Brigade	W 56–49	6–4	Royal Farms Arena	5,552
12	Friday	June 29	7:00 PM EDT	at Washington Valor	W 55–41	7–4	Capital One Arena	5,044
13	Saturday	July 7	7:00 PM EDT	Philadelphia Soul	W 71–57	8–4	Times Union Center	10,082

=== Playoffs ===
Round	Day	Date	Kickoff	Opponent	Result	Location
Semifinal #1	Saturday	July 14	7:00 PM EDT	at Washington Valor	W 57–56 OT	Capital One Arena
Semifinal #2	Saturday	July 21	7:30 PM EDT	Washington Valor	L 40–47	Times Union Center
