= Rory Nixon =

American football player (born 1991)

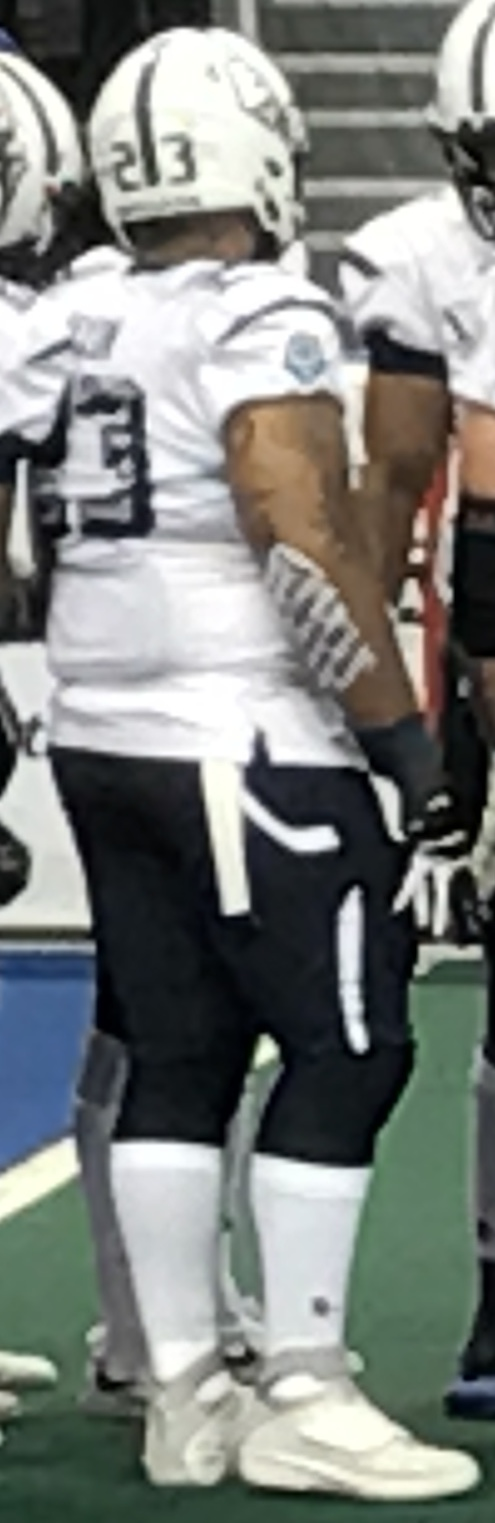
- Nixon in 2017

No. 42, 34
- Position: Fullback

Personal information
- Born: September 10, 1991 (age 35); Hampton, Virginia, U.S.
- Listed height: 6 ft 1 in (1.85 m)
- Listed weight: 305 lb (138 kg)

Career information
- High school: Hampton (VA)
- College: St. Augustine's
- NFL draft: 2013: undrafted

Career history
- Albany Panthers (2013); Richmond Raiders (2014)*; Spokane Shock (2014–2015); Los Angeles KISS (2016); Baltimore Brigade (2017–2019)
- * Offseason or practice squad member only

Awards and highlights
- Second Team All-CIAA (2012); Second Team All-Arena (2018)

Career AFL statistics
- Carries: 96
- Rushing yards: 280
- Rushing TDs: 34
- Receiving yards: 442
- Receiving TDs: 9
- Stats at ArenaFan.com

Rory Nixon (born September 10, 1991) is an American former football fullback who is currently a free agent. He played college football at St. Augustine's University and attended Hampton High School in Hampton, Virginia. He has also been a member of the Albany Panthers, Richmond Raiders, Spokane Shock and Los Angeles KISS.

== Early life ==
Nixon attended Hampton High School in Hampton, Virginia where he played both football and track and field.

== College career ==
Nixon played for the St. Augustine's Falcons from 2009 to 2012. He was the team's starter his 4 years. He played in 41 games during his career including 8 starts at guard and 33 at center. Nixon was named Second Team All-Central Intercollegiate Athletic Association as a senior in 2012.

== Professional career ==
=== Richmond Raiders ===
In November, 2013, Nixon was assigned to the Richmond Raiders of the Professional Indoor Football League. Nixon was placed on the exempt list by the Raiders.

=== Spokane Shock ===
Nixon was assigned to the Spokane Shock in 2014. Nixon scored his first career touchdown on June 20, 2014. On September 24, 2014, Nixon had his rookie option picked up by the Shock. Nixon saw a reduced role as the fullback for the Shock with the more mobile quarterbacks and the emergence as Bryson Kelly as the primary fullback.

=== Los Angeles KISS ===
On November 23, 2015, Nixon was assigned to the Los Angeles KISS. Nixon saw his best season as a professional setting career highs in every single offensive statistical category. Nixon set a career-high in rushing yards and touchdowns in a single game during the August 7th playoff game against the Cleveland Gladiators.

=== Baltimore Brigade ===
On November 15, 2016, Nixon was assigned to the Baltimore Brigade. On April 15, 2019, Nixon was assigned to the Brigade.
