= Qumain Black =

American gridiron football player (born 1992)

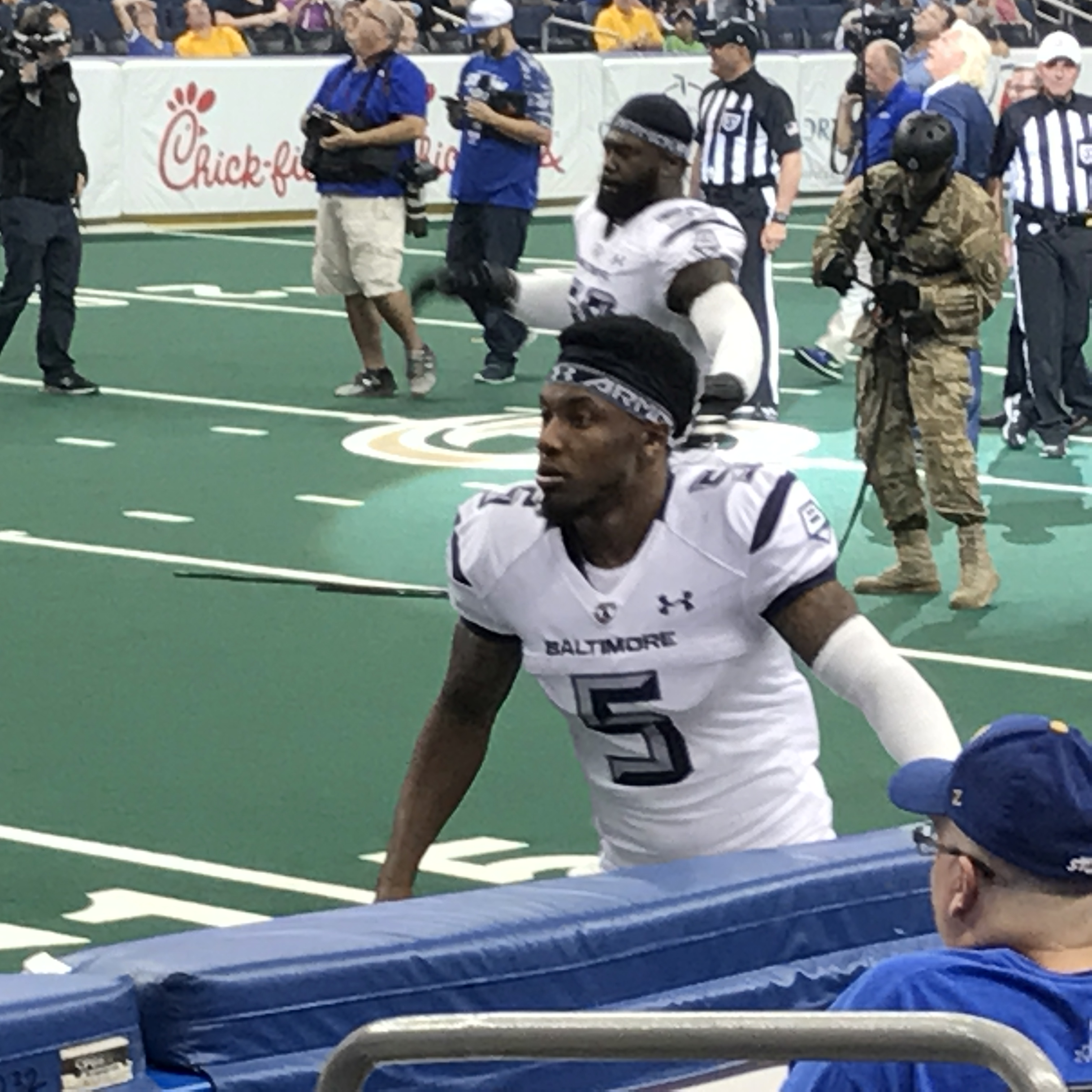
- Black in 2017

No. 20, 28, 5
- Position: Cornerback

Personal information
- Born: May 28, 1992 (age 34); Ada, Oklahoma, U.S.
- Listed height: 6 ft 1 in (1.85 m)
- Listed weight: 190 lb (86 kg)

Career information
- High school: Ada (OK)
- College: East Central
- NFL draft: 2015: undrafted

Career history
- Chicago Bears (2015)*; Los Angeles KISS (2016); BC Lions (2016)*; Baltimore Brigade (2017)
- * Offseason or practice squad member only

Qumain Black (born May 28, 1992) is an American former football defensive back. He played college football at East Central. He was a member of the Chicago Bears, Los Angeles KISS, BC Lions, and Baltimore Brigade.

== Early life ==
Black participated in high school football for Ada High School. At Ada High School he won an all-state award.

== College career ==
Black played for the East Central University Tigers from 2011 to 2013. In 2012, he received an All-GAC Honorable Mention, and in 2013, he made the Don Hansen All-Super Region Three Third-team and was an All-GAC First-team selection.

== Professional career ==
=== Chicago Bears ===
Black signed with the Chicago Bears on May 3, 2015, after going undrafted in the 2015 NFL draft. On September 5, he was released by the Bears.

=== Los Angeles KISS ===
On November 13, 2015, Black was assigned to the Los Angeles KISS of the Arena Football League. On February 3, 2016, the KISS placed Black on Other league exempt list. The KISS activated Black on May 10. On July 7, Black was placed on reassignment. On July 11, Black was assigned to the KISS.

=== BC Lions ===
Black signed with the BC Lions of the Canadian Football League on February 25, 2016. On May 5, Black was released by the Lions.

=== Baltimore Brigade ===
Black was assigned to the Baltimore Brigade on January 17, 2017.

== Personal life ==
Black is now in a federal prison serving a 170-month sentence for sex trafficking crimes. Black pled guilty to in 2021.
