= Brandon Thompkins =

American gridiron football player (born 1987)

No. 14
- Position: Wide receiver / Return specialist

Personal information
- Born: October 9, 1987 (age 39); West Palm Beach, Florida
- Listed height: 5 ft 10 in (1.78 m)
- Listed weight: 185 lb (84 kg)

Career information
- High school: Palm Beach Lakes Community High School
- College: Arkansas State
- NFL draft: 2011: undrafted

Career history
- BC Lions (2011)*; Spokane Shock (2011–2013); Utah Blaze (2013); Spokane Shock (2014); Philadelphia Soul (2014)*; Los Angeles KISS (2014); Orlando Predators (2015–2016); Cleveland Gladiators (2017); Baltimore Brigade (2017–2019)
- * Offseason or practice squad member only

Awards and highlights
- 2× First-team All-Arena (2016, 2018); 4× Second-team All-Arena (2015, 2016, 2017, 2018); AFL Playmaker of the Year (2016)

Career AFL statistics
- Receptions: 567
- Receiving yards: 7,024
- Receiving TDs: 140
- Stats at ArenaFan.com

Brandon Thompkins (born October 9, 1987) is an American former professional football wide receiver.

After playing college football at Arkansas State University, Thompkins was signed as an undrafted free agent by the CFL's BC Lions, but cut after training camp. From there, he joined Spokane Shock. After two seasons, he was assigned to the Utah Blaze, only to go back to the Shock and be traded to the Philadelphia Soul on May 29, 2014 for future considerations. The Soul traded him to the Los Angeles Kiss on May 30, 2014, for future considerations.

On December 14, 2015, Thompkins was assigned to the Predators. With the Predators, he was named Playmaker of the Year in 2016. On February 1, 2017 he was assigned to the Cleveland Gladiators. On May 22, 2017, Thompkins was traded with Shane Boyd to the Baltimore Brigade for future considerations and claim order positioning. He earned Second Team All-Arena honors in 2017. On April 19, 2019, Thompson was assigned to the Brigade again.
