= Dexter Jackson (linebacker) =

American football player (born 1988)

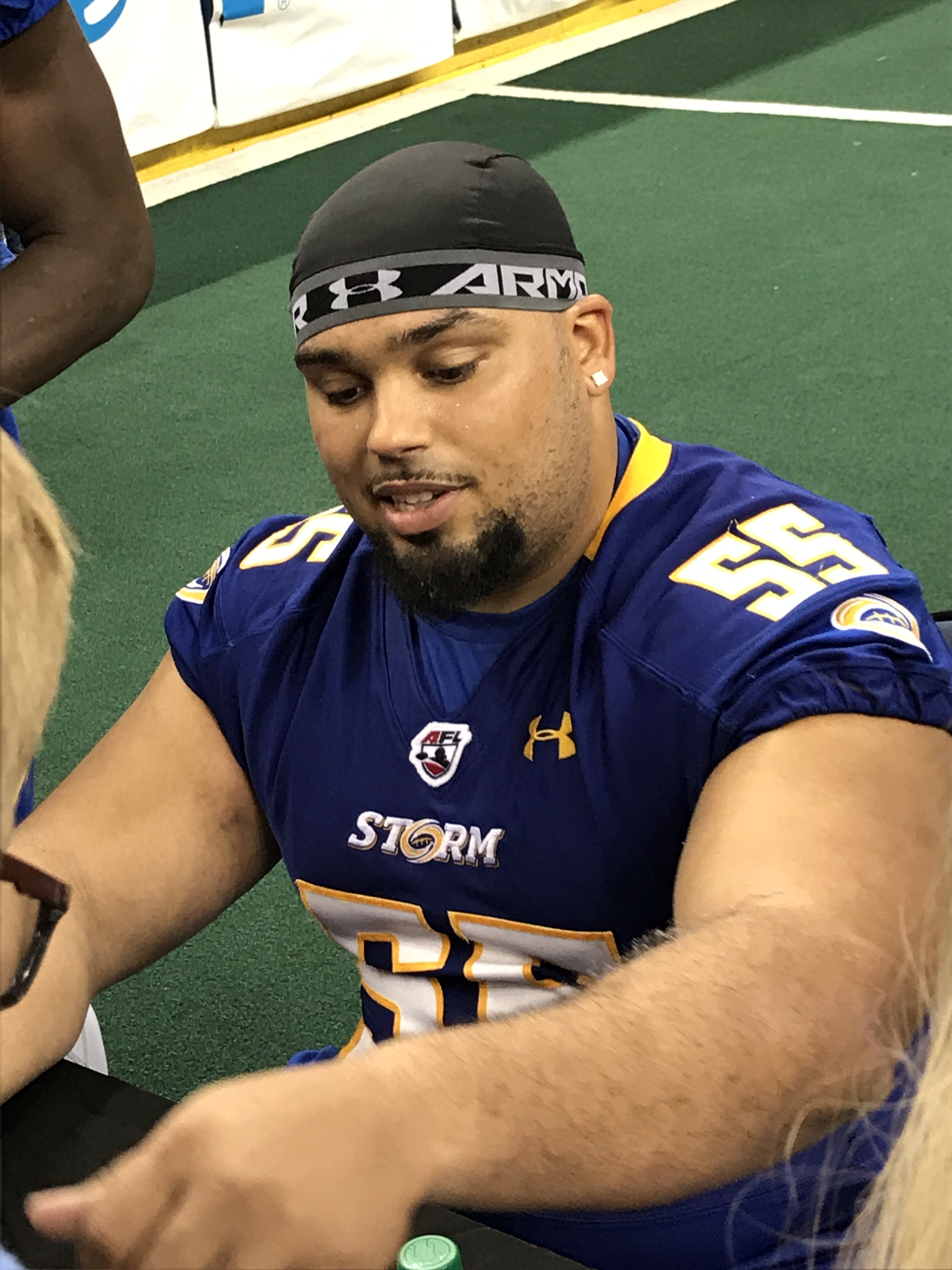
- Jackson with the Tampa Bay Storm in 2017

No. 41, 44, 55
- Position: Linebacker

Personal information
- Born: March 19, 1988 (age 38); Jacksonville, Florida, U.S.
- Listed height: 6 ft 2 in (1.88 m)
- Listed weight: 285 lb (129 kg)

Career information
- High school: Jacksonville (Florida) Edward H. White
- College: Bethune–Cookman
- NFL draft: 2010: undrafted

Career history
- Milwaukee Mustangs (2011–2012); San Jose SaberCats (2012); Orlando Predators (2013); Tampa Bay Storm (2014–2015); Jacksonville Sharks (2016); Tampa Bay Storm (2017); Baltimore Brigade (2018–2019)

Awards and highlights
- First-team All-MEAC (2009); Second-team All-MEAC (2008); First-team All-Arena (2018); Second-team All-Arena (2016)

Career AFL statistics
- Tackles: 121
- Sacks: 21
- Fumble recoveries: 7
- Stats at ArenaFan.com

Dexter Jackson (born March 19, 1988) is an American former professional football linebacker who played in the Arena Football League (AFL) for the Milwaukee Mustangs, San Jose SaberCats, Orlando Predators, Tampa Bay Storm, Jacksonville Sharks, and Baltimore Brigade.. He played college football at Bethune–Cookman University.

== Early life ==
Jackson attended Edward H. White High School in Jacksonville, Florida.

== College career ==
Jackson attended Bethune–Cookman University from 2006 to 2009, where he was a Second Team All-Mid-Eastern Athletic Conference selection as a defensive lineman.

== Professional career ==
Pre-draft measurables
Height	Weight	40-yard dash	10-yard split	20-yard split	20-yard shuttle	Three-cone drill	Vertical jump	Broad jump	Bench press
6 ft 0 5/8 in (1.84 m)	272 lb (123 kg)	5.20 s	1.78 s	3.08 s	4.57 s	8.78 s	33.0 in (0.84 m)	8 ft 5 in (2.57 m)	21 reps
All values from Pro Day

On December 12, 2010, Jackson was assigned to the Milwaukee Mustangs. Jackson was again assigned to the Mustangs on October 12, 2011. On April 16, 2012, Jackson was placed on reassignment.

On April 18, 2012, Jackson was traded to the San Jose SaberCats for future considerations. Jackson finished the season injured reserve.

Jackson was assigned to the Orlando Predators on a two-year deal prior to the 2013 season. Jackson was reassigned on May 16, 2013, but was assigned again to the Predators on May 23, 2013.

Jackson was assigned to the Tampa Bay Storm for the 2014 season, and started every game he was active in 2014 and 2015.

In March 2016, Jackson was assigned to the Jacksonville Sharks. Jackson was named Second Team All-Arena at the conclusion of the season.

In January 2017, Jackson returned to the Storm. The Storm folded in December 2017.

On March 22, 2018, Jackson was assigned to the Baltimore Brigade.

== Personal life ==
He is the son of bodybuilder Dexter Jackson.
