= Phillipkeith Manley =

American football player (born 1990)

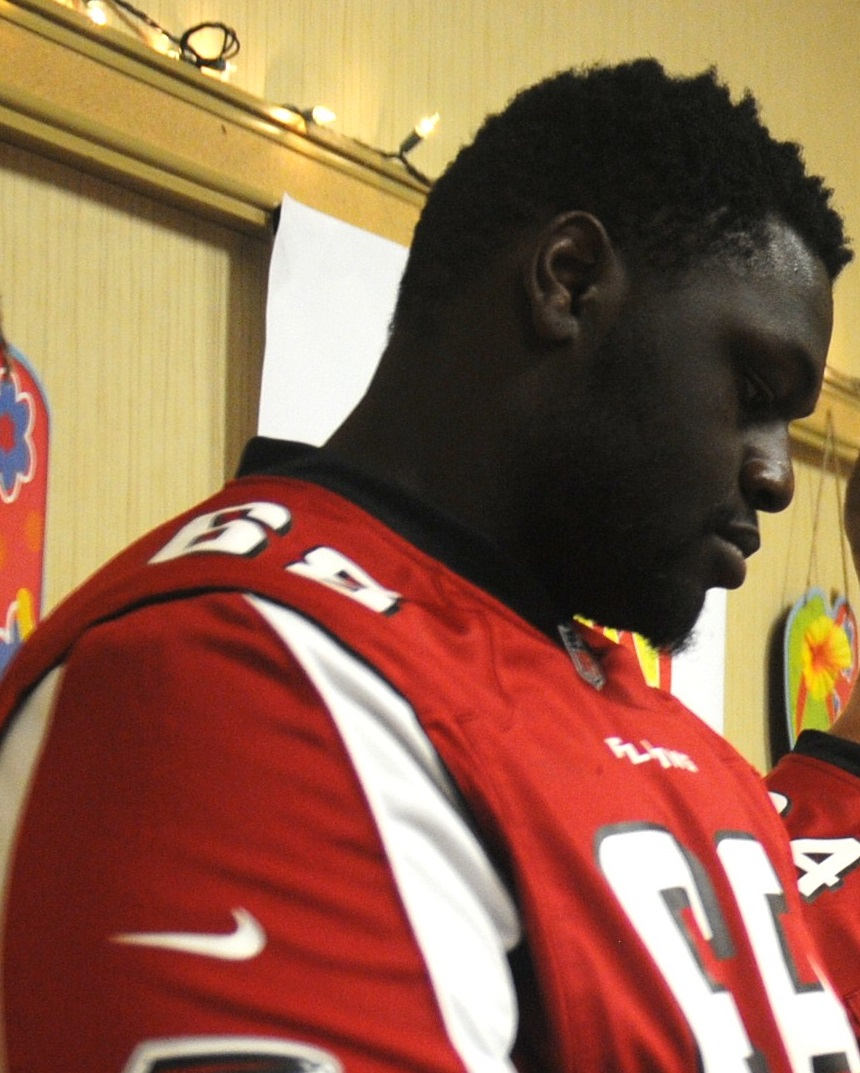
- Manley at the 2013 National Guard Association of Georgia convention

No. 44
- Position: Offensive guard

Personal information
- Born: May 7, 1990 (age 36); Hamilton, Ohio, U.S.
- Listed height: 6 ft 5 in (1.96 m)
- Listed weight: 309 lb (140 kg)

Career information
- High school: Hamilton (Ohio)
- College: Toledo
- NFL draft: 2012: undrafted

Career history
- Atlanta Falcons (2012); Dallas Cowboys (2013)*; Cleveland Gladiators (2014)*; Carolina Panthers (2014)*; Cleveland Gladiators (2015–2017); Washington Valor (2017); Philadelphia Soul (2018–2019)
- * Offseason or practice squad member only

Awards and highlights
- Military Bowl champion (2011); Second Team All-Arena (2018)

Career AFL statistics
- Rushing yards: 89
- Rushing TDs: 6
- Receiving yards: 184
- Receiving TDs: 3
- Stats at ArenaFan.com
- Stats at Pro Football Reference

Phillipkeith Alexander Manley (born May 7, 1990) is an American former professional football offensive guard. He signed with the Atlanta Falcons as an undrafted free agent in 2012. He played college football at Toledo.

== Early life ==
He was ranked at No. 63 in the state of Ohio by Ohio High Magazine. He was selected for the first-team all-league and first-team All-Butler County.

College recruiting
Name	Hometown	School	Height	Weight	Commit date
Phillip Manley; OG	Hamilton, Ohio	Hamilton HS	6 ft 4 in (1.93 m)	314 lb (142 kg)	Jan 26, 2008
Phillip Manley; OG	Recruit ratings: Scout: Rivals: (74)				
Overall recruit ranking: Scout: 121 (OG); 83 (team recruiting) Rivals: 104 (team recruiting)
Note: In many cases, Scout, Rivals, 247Sports, On3, and ESPN may conflict in their listings of height and weight.; In these cases, the average was taken. ESPN grades are on a 100-point scale.; Sources: "2008 Toledo Football Commitment List". Rivals.; "2008 Toledo College Football Team Recruiting Prospects". Scout.; "Toledo Rockets football 2008 player commits". ESPN.; "Scout.com Team Recruiting Rankings". Scout.; "2008 Team Ranking". Rivals.com.

== College career ==
He played college football at Toledo. He started 13 games in his Junior season at left guard for the Toledo Rockets. In his senior season, he helped anchor an offensive line and offense to rush for 2,777 rushing yards, including Toledo running back Adonis Thomas who also rushed for a team-high 1,071 rushing yards.

== Professional career ==
Pre-draft measurables
Height	Weight	40-yard dash	10-yard split	20-yard split	20-yard shuttle	Three-cone drill	Vertical jump	Broad jump
6 ft 3 in (1.91 m)	330 lb (150 kg)	5.31 s	1.80 s	3.04 s	4.90 s	8.03 s	23 in (0.58 m)	7 ft 9 in (2.36 m)
All measurables were taken at Pro Day at the University of Toledo.

=== Atlanta Falcons ===
On April 30, 2012, he signed with the Atlanta Falcons as an undrafted free agent. On August 31, 2012, he was released. On September 11, 2012, he was signed to the practice squad. On November 6, 2012, he was promoted to the active roster after the team placed offensive guard Garrett Reynolds on injured reserve.

Two days after the team signed him to the practice squad, the Falcons reached an injury settlement with Manley on September 3, 2013.

=== Dallas Cowboys ===
On November 6, 2013, he was signed to the Dallas Cowboys practice squad. On November 12, 2013, he was released from the practice squad.

=== Cleveland Gladiators ===
Manley was assigned to the Cleveland Gladiators of the Arena Football League. He was reassigned on June 9, 2014.

=== Carolina Panthers ===
Manley signed a one-year contract with the Carolina Panthers.

=== Washington Valor ===
On July 7, 2017, Manley was claimed off reassignment by the Washington Valor. On July 10, 2017, he was placed on refused to report.

=== Philadelphia Soul ===
Manley was assigned to the Philadelphia Soul on March 20, 2018.
