= James Romain =

American football player (born 1987)

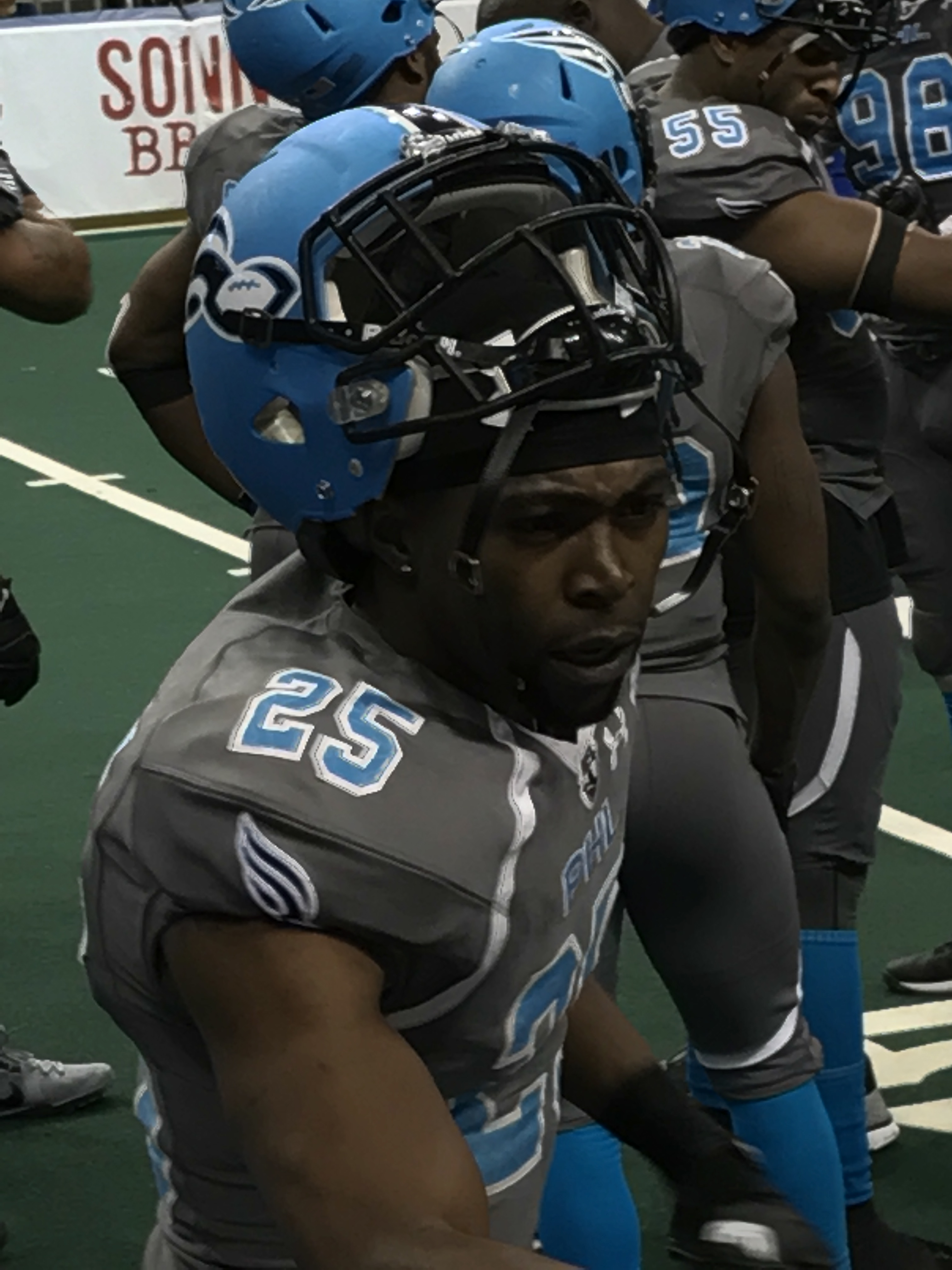
- Romain with the Philadelphia Soul in 2017

No. 24, 5, 25
- Position: Defensive back

Personal information
- Born: August 6, 1987 (age 39); Far Rockaway, Queens, U.S.
- Listed height: 5 ft 11 in (1.80 m)
- Listed weight: 175 lb (79 kg)

Career information
- High school: Far Rockaway
- College: Hudson Valley CC (2005–2006); Delaware State (2007–2008)
- NFL draft: 2009: undrafted

Career history

Playing
- Fairbanks Grizzlies (2011); Green Bay Blizzard (2012); Philadelphia Soul (2013–2019); Beijing Lions (2016–2018)

Coaching
- York Capitals (2015) Defensive backs coach; Frisco Fighters (2020–2021) Defensive backs coach; Iowa Rampage (2024) Defensive coordinator/defensive backs coach; West Texas Desert Hawks (2024) Defensive coordinator/defensive backs coach; Colorado Spartans (2025–present) Defensive coordinator

Awards and highlights
- 2× ArenaBowl champion (2016, 2017); China Bowl champion (2016); 4× First-team All-Arena (2015, 2017–2019); 2× AFL Defensive Back of the Year (2018–2019); AFL Defensive Player of the Year (2019); CAFL All-Pro North Division All-Star (2016); CAFL Steel-man (2016); First-team All-IFL (2011)

Career AFL statistics
- Tackles: 402
- Interceptions: 42
- Pass breakups: 134
- Stats at ArenaFan.com

James Romain (born August 6, 1987) is an American former professional football defensive back who played for the Philadelphia Soul of the Arena Football League (AFL). He played college football at Delaware State University.

== Early life ==
Romain attended Far Rockaway High School in New York City, where he played football as a running back.

== College career ==
Romain played for the Hudson Valley Vikings from 2005 to 2006. Romain transferred to Delaware State, where he played from 2007 to 2008. He was the team's starter his senior year and helped the Hornets to 15 wins. He played in 23 games during his career, including 11 starts at cornerback. Romain was named a 2006 Preseason All-American.

== Professional career ==
Romain played for the Fairbanks Grizzlies of the Indoor Football League (IFL) in 2011. Romain had 11 interceptions as a rookie and forced 3 fumbles, along with 3 Touchdowns earning him First Team All-IFL honors.

On January 12, 2012, Romain signed with the IFL's Green Bay Blizzard. Romain had 57 tackles and 4 interceptions on the season.

On January 2, 2013, Romain was assigned to the Philadelphia Soul of the Arena Football League (AFL). On August 26, 2016, the Soul beat the Arizona Rattlers in ArenaBowl XXIX by a score of 56–42. He earned first-team All-Arena honors in 2017. On August 26, 2017, the Soul beat the Tampa Bay Storm in ArenaBowl XXX by a score of 44–40. With the Soul, Romain was selected as the 2018 Defensive Back of the Year.

Romain was selected by the Beijing Lions in the third round of the 2016 CAFL draft, joining his Soul head coach Clint Dolezel in Beijing. The Lions finished the season undefeated and won the first China Bowl. He earned All-Pro North Division All-Star honors and was named the CAFL's Steel-man for his "all around excellence at several positions". He also caught 21 passes for 217 yards and 5 touchdowns. He is listed on the Lions' roster for the 2018 season.

=== AFL statistics ===
Legend
| | AFL Defensive Player of the Year |
| | Won the ArenaBowl |
| **Bold** | Career high |

| Year | Team | Defensive | | | | | | | | | | Returns | | |
| Year | Team | Tkl | Ast | Sck | PB | FF | FR | Blk | Int | Yds | TD | Ret | Yds | TD |
|---|---|---|---|---|---|---|---|---|---|---|---|---|---|---|
| 2013 | Philadelphia | 35 | 15 | 0.0 | 19 | **3** | 0 | 0 | 3 | 62 | 1 | 9 | 162 | **1** |
| 2014 | Philadelphia | **75** | 16 | 0.0 | 18 | 2 | **4** | 0 | 5 | 90 | 2 | 10 | 164 | **1** |
| 2015 | Philadelphia | 66 | 10 | 0.0 | **29** | **3** | 0 | 0 | **10** | 99 | 1 | **20** | **351** | 0 |
| 2016 | Philadelphia | 54 | **18** | 0.0 | 18 | 1 | 0 | 0 | 5 | 47 | 1 | 0 | 0 | 0 |
| 2017 | Philadelphia | 69 | 11 | 0.0 | 23 | **3** | 0 | 0 | 5 | 58 | 0 | 2 | 53 | **1** |
| 2018 | Philadelphia | 51 | 8 | 0.0 | 15 | **3** | 0 | 0 | 5 | 3 | 0 | 0 | 0 | 0 |
| 2019 | Philadelphia | 52 | 7 | 0.0 | 12 | 0 | 0 | 0 | 9 | **136** | **3** | 0 | 0 | 0 |
| Career | | 402 | 85 | 0.0 | 134 | 13 | 5 | 0 | 42 | 495 | 8 | 41 | 730 | 3 |
