= Rodney Fritz =

American gridiron football player (born 1987)

No. 17, 40, 24, 5
- Position: Defensive lineman

Personal information
- Born: May 8, 1987 (age 39); Kansas City, Missouri, U.S.
- Listed height: 6 ft 1 in (1.85 m)
- Listed weight: 260 lb (118 kg)

Career information
- High school: Columbia (MO) Hickman
- College: Tennessee State
- NFL draft: 2010: undrafted

Career history
- Huntington Hammer (2011); Tulsa Talons (2011)*; Winnipeg Blue Bombers (2011–2013); Toronto Argonauts (2013)*; San Jose SaberCats (2014–2015); Los Angeles KISS (2016); Arizona Rattlers (2016); Baltimore Brigade (2018); Albany Empire (2019)
- * Offseason or practice squad member only

Awards and highlights
- 2× ArenaBowl champion (2015, 2019); Second-team All-Arena (2018)

Career CFL statistics
- Tackles: 8
- Sacks: 1
- Stats at CFL.ca (archived)

Career AFL statistics
- Tackles: 22
- Sacks: 9
- Forced fumbles: 4
- Fumble recoveries: 2
- Stats at ArenaFan.com

Rodney Fritz Jr. (born May 8, 1987) is an American former professional football defensive lineman who played in the Arena Football League (AFL) and Canadian Football League (CFL).

== Early life ==
Born the son of Jennifer and Rodney Fritz, Rodney attended Hickman High School in Columbia, Missouri. There he was named all-state as tight end, after having 21 receptions for 549 yards and nine touchdowns, and was an honorable mention as a linebacker. He was also named all conference in basketball.

== College career ==
In 2006, Rodney attended Highland CC, where he played in nine games, registering 71 tackles (46 solo, 25 assists), and posted three sacks with 9.5 tackles for a loss (37 yards). He also managed one forced fumble. As a result, he was named to the Kansas Jayhawk Community College Conference Second Team.

In 2007, Rodney transferred to Los Angeles Pierce College, where he played in nine games, registering 98 tackles (61 solo, 37 assists), and posted seven sacks with 19 tackles for a loss (37 yards). He also managed one interception, three forced fumbles and two fumble recoveries. As a result, he was named to the Western State Conference First Team.

As a junior in 2008, he transferred to Tennessee State University, where he played in 17 games, recording 40 tackles (9 of which were sacks).

== Professional career ==
In 2011, Fritz signed with the Huntington Hammer of the Ultimate Indoor Football League (UIFL). There he led the Hammer defense in tackles-for-loss, was second on the team in sacks, and recorded the most forced fumbles.

On Friday, July 15, 2011, the Tulsa Talons of the Arena Football League (AFL) signed Fritz. By signing with the Talons, he became the first UIFL player to sign with an AFL team.

Signed as a free agent on August 9, 2011 to the practice roster with the Winnipeg Blue Bombers of the Canadian Football League (CFL). During the 2013 CFL training camp, he was released by the Blue Bombers.

On August 5, 2013, Fritz signed a practice roster agreement with the Toronto Argonauts of the CFL. He was released by the Argonauts on August 21, 2013.

On November 11, 2015, Fritz was assigned to the Los Angeles KISS of the AFL. On June 17, 2016, Fritz was placed on reassignment.

On June 20, 2016, Fritz was claimed by the Arizona Rattlers of the AFL.

On March 22, 2018, Fritz was assigned to the Baltimore Brigade of the AFL.

On April 4, 2019, Fritz was assigned to the Albany Empire of the AFL.
