= Greg McGhee =

American football player and coach (born 1992)

North Carolina A&T Aggies
- Title: Offensive coordinator

Personal information
- Born: November 22, 1992 (age 33); Pittsburgh, Pennsylvania, U.S.
- Listed height: 6 ft 3 in (1.91 m)
- Listed weight: 205 lb (93 kg)

Career information
- Position: Quarterback (No. 2, 16)
- High school: Pittsburgh (PA) Perry Traditional
- College: Howard
- NFL draft: 2015: undrafted

Career history

Playing
- BC Lions (2015–2016); Montreal Alouettes (2016–2017); Green Bay Blizzard (2017); Philadelphia Soul (2018); Toronto Argonauts (2018); Columbus Destroyers (2019)*
- * Offseason or practice squad member only

Coaching
- West Liberty (2020) Graduate assistant; West Liberty (2021) Quarterbacks coach; West Liberty (2022) Offensive coordinator & quarterbacks coach; Howard (2023–2024) Quarterbacks coach; North Carolina A&T (2025–present) Offensive coordinator

Awards and highlights
- MEAC Co-Offensive Player of the Year (2014)

Career CFL statistics
- Comp. / Att.: 2 / 6
- Passing yards: 28
- TD–INT: 0–0
- Rushing yards: 10
- Rushing TD: 1
- Stats at CFL.ca

Career AFL statistics
- Comp. / Att.: 6 / 9
- Passing yards: 48
- TD–INT: 2–0
- QB rating: 119.44
- Rushing TD: 0
- Stats at ArenaFan.com

Greg McGhee (born November 22, 1992) is an American college football coach and former quarterback. He is the offensive coordinator for North Carolina A&T University, a position he has held since 2025. He played college football at Howard University and attended Perry Traditional Academy in Pittsburgh, Pennsylvania. He has also been a member of the BC Lions, Montreal Alouettes, Green Bay Blizzard, and Toronto Argonauts.

== Early life ==
McGhee attended Perry Traditional Academy in Pittsburgh, Pennsylvania, where he was a member of both the football and basketball teams.

== College career ==
Heading into his senior season, McGhee was voted preseason Mid-Eastern Athletic Conference Offensive Player of the Year. McGhee was named Co-MEAC Offensive Player of the Year at the conclusion of the season, sharing the title with Tarik Cohen.

== Professional career ==
=== BC Lions ===
On February 19, 2015, McGhee signed with the BC Lions of the Canadian Football League. On June 18, 2016, McGhee was cut.

=== Montreal Alouettes ===
McGhee signed with the Montreal Alouettes prior to the 2017 season, but he did not make the team's roster.

=== Green Bay Blizzard ===
On May 18, 2017, McGhee signed with the Green Bay Blizzard. McGhee threw for 433 yards and 6 touchdowns in 4 games with the Blizzard.

=== Philadelphia Soul ===
Prior to the start of the 2018 season, McGhee was assigned to the Philadelphia Soul. After not playing the first 6 weeks, McGhee was thrust into action when Dan Raudabaugh left the Soul's May 19 game against the Albany Empire. McGhee threw two touchdown passes, but the Soul lost to the Empire 41–36.

=== Toronto Argonauts ===
McGhee signed with the Toronto Argonauts in the 2018 season.

=== Columbus Destroyers ===
On March 5, 2019, McGhee was assigned to the Columbus Destroyers. On April 13, 2019, he was placed on recallable reassignment and became a free agent.

== Coaching career ==
In 2020, McGhee joined West Liberty as a graduate assistant. In 2021, he was promoted to quarterbacks coach. In 2022, he was promoted to offensive coordinator while retaining his role as quarterbacks coach.

In 2023, McGhee was hired as the quarterbacks coach for Howard.

On January 13, 2025, McGhee was hired as the offensive coordinator for North Carolina A&T.
