= Brandon Sesay =

American football player (born 1986)

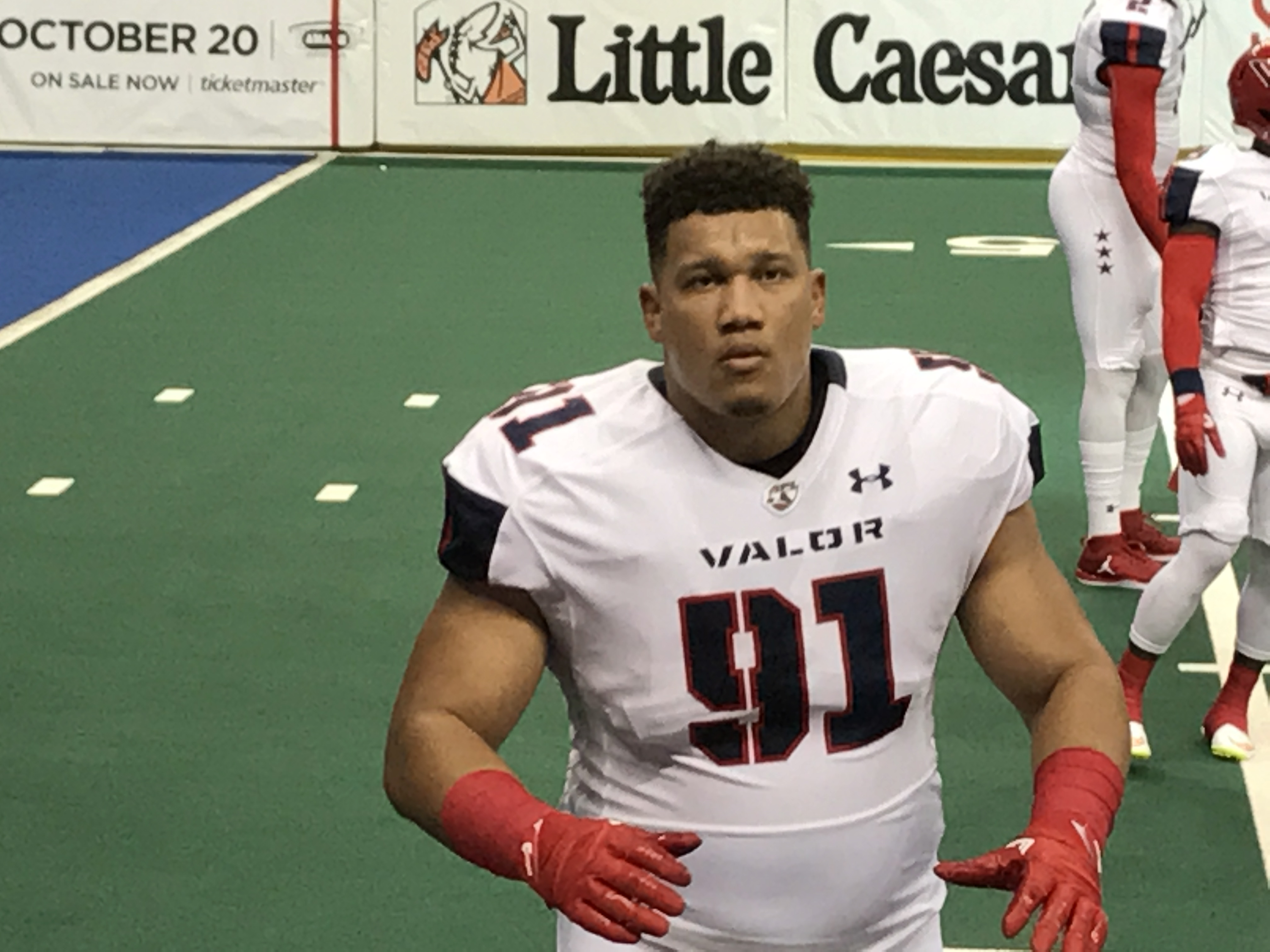
- Sesay with the Washington Valor in 2017

No. 9, 18, 91
- Position: Defensive lineman

Personal information
- Born: December 16, 1986 (age 39); Atlanta, Georgia, U.S.
- Listed height: 6 ft 6 in (1.98 m)
- Listed weight: 285 lb (129 kg)

Career information
- High school: Atlanta (GA) Douglass
- College: Texas Tech
- NFL draft: 2010: undrafted

Career history
- Iowa Barnstormers (2011); West Texas Roughnecks (2012); San Antonio Talons (2013–2014); Tampa Bay Storm (2015); Portland Steel (2016); Washington Valor (2017–2018); Albany Empire (2018–2019); Albany Empire (2022–2023)

Awards and highlights
- ArenaBowl champion (2019); Second-team All-Arena (2018)

Career AFL statistics
- Total tackles: 77
- Sacks: 17
- Fumble recoveries: 3
- Stats at ArenaFan.com

Brandon Sesay (born December 16, 1986) is an American former professional football defensive lineman who played in the Arena Football League (AFL). He played college football at the Texas Tech University. He has been a member of the Iowa Barnstormers, West Texas Roughnecks, San Antonio Talons, Tampa Bay Storm, Portland Steel, Washington Valor, Albany Empire (AFL) and Albany Empire (NAL).

== Early life ==
Sesay attended Douglass High School in Atlanta, Georgia.

College recruiting
Name	Hometown	School	Height	Weight	40^{‡}	Commit date
Brandon Sesay; DT	Atlanta, Georgia	Douglass High School	6 ft 5 in (1.96 m)	250 lb (110 kg)	4.85	Nov 17, 2004
Brandon Sesay; DT	Recruit ratings: Scout: Rivals: 247Sports:					
Overall recruit ranking: Scout: 17 (DE) Rivals: 20 (DT), 10 (GA)
Note: In many cases, Scout, Rivals, 247Sports, On3, and ESPN may conflict in their listings of height and weight.; In these cases, the average was taken. ESPN grades are on a 100-point scale.; Sources: "Georgia Football Commitment List". Rivals.; "Georgia College Football Recruiting Commits". Scout.; "Scout.com Team Recruiting Rankings". Scout.; "2005 Team Ranking". Rivals.com.

== College career ==
In November 2004, Sesay committed to play football for the Georgia Bulldogs. However Sesay did not make it to Georgia and enrolled at Northwest Mississippi Community College in 2005. Sesay transferred to the College of the Sequoias for the 2006 season, before transferring to Texas Tech. Sesay played for the Red Raiders from 2007 to 2009. He was the team's starter his final three years and helped the Red Raiders to 20 wins. He played in 11 games during his career.

== Professional career ==
=== Iowa Barnstormers ===
Sesay was assigned to the Iowa Barnstormers for the 2011 season. Sesay tallied 17 tackles and 2.0 sacks.

=== West Texas Roughnecks ===
Sesay placed with the West Texas Roughnecks of the Lone Star Football League in 2012.

=== San Antonio Talons ===
On December 12, 2012, Sesay was assigned to the San Antonio Talons. Sesay was assigned to the Talons again on March 18, 2013. Sesay was assigned and reassigned by the Talons all season long during the 2013 season and never appeared in a game. Sesay played with the Talons again in 2014, compiling 23 tackles and 4.0 sacks.

=== Tampa Bay Storm ===
Sesay was assigned to the Tampa Bay Storm on March 5, 2015.

=== Portland Steel ===
Sesay played with the Portland Steel in 2016.

=== Washington Valor ===
Sesay was assigned to the Washington Valor in 2017. On May 9, 2018, he was placed on reassignment.

=== Albany Empire (AFL) ===
On May 17, 2018, Sesay was assigned to the Albany Empire. On March 7, 2019, Sesay was assigned to the Empire.

=== Albany Empire (NAL) ===
On September 9, 2021, Sesay signed with the Albany Empire of the National Arena League (NAL). On November 1, 2022, Sesay re-signed with the Empire.
