= ArenaBowl XXXI =

2018 Arena Football League championship game

Washington Valor	Baltimore Brigade
69	55
	1	2	3	4	Total
WSH	7	28	21	13	69
BAL	7	13	14	21	55
- Date: July 28, 2018
- Stadium: Royal Farms Arena; Baltimore, Maryland
- MVP: Arvell Nelson, Washington
- Attendance: 8,183
- Winning coach: Benji McDowell
- Losing coach: Omarr Smith

TV in the United States
- Network: CBS Sports Network
- Announcers: Brent Stover, Sherdrick Bonner and Ari Wolfe

ArenaBowl XXXI was the championship game of the 2018 Arena Football League season. The game was broadcast on CBS Sports Network, AFLNow and Twitter. It featured the fourth-seeded Washington Valor and the second-seeded Baltimore Brigade at the Royal Farms Arena in Baltimore. It was the first ArenaBowl championship for both teams as they were expansion teams in the previous season. Both teams were owned by Ted Leonsis, giving him his second league championship in six weeks following his Washington Capitals team's victory in the NHL's 2018 Stanley Cup Final. The title sponsor for the game was Bud Light.

The paid attendance was 8,183, the smallest in ArenaBowl history.

== 2018 playoffs ==
All four AFL teams qualified for the 2018 playoffs. The playoffs consisted of a two-game home-and-home semifinal series with the winners determined by aggregate score. With one week remaining in the 2018 regular season and a then three-way tie for first, the league announced the ArenaBowl would be hosted by the semifinal winner with the higher average attendance through the season instead of using any tiebreakers or home field advantage based on records.

The #2 seeded Baltimore Brigade defeated the #3 seeded Philadelphia Soul by a combined score of 110–86 with Baltimore winning both games, 57–45 in the first and game two with 54–41. The fourth-seeded Washington Valor upset the top-seeded Albany Empire by a combined score of 103–97, where Albany won game one 57–56 in overtime and game two was won by Washington 47–40.

Once the semifinals were completed, contrary to the previous league statement on the host team, the higher-seeded Baltimore Brigade, not the higher-attended Washington Valor, hosted ArenaBowl XXXI at Royal Farms Arena. The Valor's home field, Capital One Arena, had already scheduled summer renovations to begin at that time. The Washington Valor upset the Baltimore Brigade by a final score of 69–55.
