= 2018 Arena Football League season =

- League: Arena Football League
- Sport: Arena football
- Duration: April 13 – July 28, 2018

Regular season
- Season champions: Albany Empire

League postseason
- #1 vs #4 champions: Washington Valor (#4)
- #1 vs #4 runners-up: Albany Empire (#1)
- #2 vs. #3 champions: Baltimore Brigade (#2)
- #2 vs. #3 runners-up: Philadelphia Soul (#3)

ArenaBowl XXXI
- Champions: Washington Valor
- Runners-up: Baltimore Brigade
- Finals MVP: Arvell Nelson

AFL seasons
- ← 2017 2019 →

AFL teams

The 2018 Arena Football League season was the 31st season in the history of the Arena Football League (AFL). Prior to the start of the season, the league contracted from five to four teams with one team folding, one going on hiatus, and one added expansion team. The 12-game regular season began on April 13 and ended on July 7.

== League business ==
=== League organization changes ===
The offseason was marked by uncertainty until the AFL and Arena Football League Players' Union reached a new deal on a four-year collective bargaining agreement (CBA), nearly doubling player compensation and expanding health insurance benefits, replacing the previous CBA, which had expired after the 2017 season. The deal was finally reached amid rumors that the season and league's existence were in jeopardy when the two sides were failing to negotiate through several proposals and supposed ultimatums.

On March 27, 2018, the AFL announced commissioner Scott Butera would be replaced by Randall Boe. During Butera's three seasons as commissioner, the league had decreased from 14 members in the 2014 season to four for the 2018 season.

=== Teams ===
On August 23, 2017, the week of ArenaBowl XXX, multiple sources revealed that the AFL planned to expand to Albany, New York, and Newark, New Jersey, for 2018. The Albany Empire was confirmed October 24, with the team owned by Hearst Communications executive George Randolph Hearst III and sharing non-football management with the Philadelphia Soul.

On November 28, the Cleveland Gladiators announced that they would have to take a two-year leave of absence while their arena, shared with its primary tenant the NBA's Cleveland Cavaliers, undergoes construction during the basketball offseason. The next month, the longest-tenured AFL team, with franchise roots to the inaugural AFL season, the Tampa Bay Storm, also suspended operations citing higher operating costs combined with lower revenues, but did not rule out returning in the future.

In February 2018, the 2018 season schedule was finalized with only the returning Baltimore, Philadelphia, and Washington teams and the expansion Albany team, but no Newark team, matching the size of the league in the original "demonstration season" in 1987.

=== Schedule and playoff changes ===
The 2018 season consisted of a 13-week schedule during which each team played 12 games and had one bye week. With only four participating members for the season, the schedule for each team decreased by two games, continuing the trend of shortened seasons since the 2015 season. All teams played each opponent four times. Expansion Albany played seven home games, Baltimore and Washington six, and defending champion Philadelphia had only five.

At the end of the regular season, all teams participated in the ArenaBowl playoffs, in which the top seed faced the 4th seed while the 2nd seed faced the 3rd seed in a home and home series. The team in each series with the highest aggregate score advanced to the ArenaBowl. If the aggregate score in either series had been tied after the second game in the home-and-home semifinals, the game would have continued in the AFL's standard overtime format; this was not necessitated. While the semifinals consisted of two games in each pairing, ArenaBowl XXXI was still only one game.

With one week remaining in the 2018 regular season and a then three-way tie for first, the league announced the ArenaBowl would be hosted by the semifinal winner with the higher average attendance through the season instead of using any tiebreakers or home field advantage based on records. However, once the semifinals were completed, the higher-seeded Baltimore Brigade, not the higher-attended Washington Valor, would host ArenaBowl XXXI as the Valor's home field, Capital One Arena, had already scheduled summer renovations to begin at that time.

== Regular season standings ==
2018 Arena Football League standings
Team	Overall			Points		Records			
Team	W	L	PCT	PF	PA	Home	Away	GB	STK
(#)-Albany Empire	8	4	.667	646	564	4–3	4–1	—	W3
Baltimore Brigade	7	5	.583	605	562	5–1	2–4	1	L3
Philadelphia Soul	7	5	.583	612	577	3-2	4-3	1	L1
Washington Valor	2	10	.167	482	642	1–5	1–5	6	W1

^{(#)} - clinched regular season title

== Playoffs ==
Semifinals
1	Albany	57*	40	97
4	Washington	56	47	103
2	Baltimore	57	53	110
3	Philadelphia	45	41	86

ArenaBowl XXXI
4	Washington	69
2	Baltimore	55

*Indicates overtime victory

=== Semifinals ===
All times listed are in EDT.

Date	Kickoff	Away	Score	Home	Game site	Recap
July 14	7:00 p.m.	Albany Empire	57–56 (OT)	Washington Valor	Capital One Arena	
July 21	7:30 p.m.	Washington Valor	47–40	Albany Empire	Times Union Center	
July 15	6:00 p.m.	Baltimore Brigade	57–45	Philadelphia Soul	Wells Fargo Center	
July 20	7:00 p.m.	Philadelphia Soul	41–53	Baltimore Brigade	Royal Farms Arena	

=== ArenaBowl XXXI ===
Date	Kickoff	Away	Score	Home	Game site	Recap
July 28	7:00 p.m.	Washington Valor	69–55	Baltimore Brigade	Royal Farms Arena	

== Awards ==
=== All-Arena team ===
Offense
Position	First team	Second team
Quarterback	Tommy Grady, Albany	Randy Hippeard, Baltimore
Fullback	Jeramie Richardson, Philadelphia	Rory Nixon, Baltimore
Wide receiver	Joe Hills, Albany; Malachi Jones, Albany; Darius Prince, Philadelphia	Reggie Gray, Washington; Brandon Thompkins, Baltimore; Aaron Wascha, Philadelphia
Center	Ryan Cave, Albany	Phillipkeith Manley, Philadelphia
Offensive lineman	Hayworth Hicks, Albany; Jordan McCray, Baltimore	Neal Tivis, Philadelphia; Wayne Tribue, Philadelphia

Defense
Position	First team	Second team
Defensive end	Joe Sykes, Albany; Jake Metz, Philadelphia	Darryl Cato-Bishop, Albany; Rodney Fritz, Baltimore
Defensive tackle	Justin Lawrence, Baltimore	Brandon Sesay, Albany
Middle linebacker	Dexter Jackson, Baltimore	Derrick Summers, Albany
Jack linebacker	Terence Moore, Albany	Joe Goosby, Philadelphia
Defensive back	Marrio Norman, Albany; James Romain, Philadelphia; Virgil Gray, Baltimore	Dwayne Hollis, Cleveland; Joe Powell, Baltimore; Varmah Sonie, Albany

Special teams
Position	First team	Second team
Kicker	Mark Lewis, Baltimore	Adrian Trevino, Philadelphia
Special teams	Brandon Thompkins, Baltimore	Chris Duvalt, Washington

== Attendances ==
Team	Home average
Albany Empire	9,714
Baltimore Brigade	5,113
Philadelphia Soul	9,454
Washington Valor	6,742
Overall average	7,601
