= Washington Valor =

Arena football team

Logo

General information
- Founded: 2016
- Folded: 2019
- Headquartered: Capital One Arena in Washington, D.C.
- Colors: Red, navy blue, silver, white
- WashingtonValor.com

Personnel
- Owner: Monumental Sports & Entertainment
- CEO: Ted Leonsis
- Head coach: Benji McDowell
- President: Roger Mody

Team history
- Washington Valor (2017–2019)

Home fields
- Capital One Arena (2017–2019)

League / conference affiliations
- Arena Football League (2017–2019)

Championships
- League championships: 1: 2018

Playoff appearances (2)
- 2018, 2019

The Washington Valor were a professional arena football team based in Washington, D.C. that played in the Arena Football League (AFL) from 2017 to 2019. The team's home arena was the Capital One Arena. The Valor were owned by Ted Leonsis through Monumental Sports & Entertainment.

The initial announcement was made in February 2016 of being close to a deal. The official announcement was made on March 10, 2016. The team name "Valor", and colors of red, white, blue and silver were announced in July 2016. The Valor were the first AFL franchise to play in the DC market since the Washington Commandos folded in 1990. The Valor have one Arena Football League title, having defeated fellow Monumental property Baltimore in ArenaBowl XXXI.

Following the 2019 season, the AFL ceased operations.

== History ==
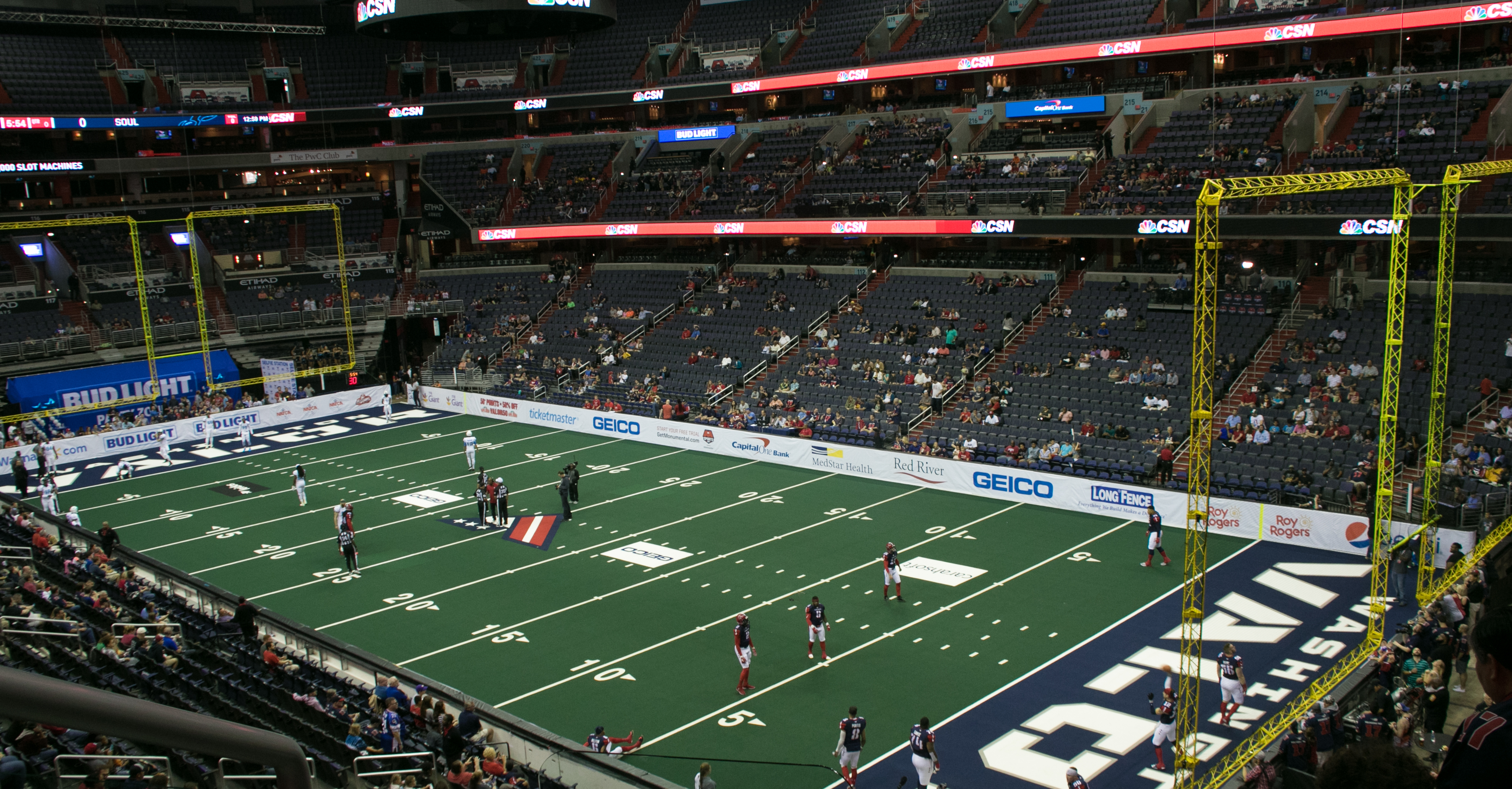
The Verizon Center in 2017

Washington, D.C. originally had one of the 1987 AFL charter teams called the Washington Commandos. The team played its home games during its first season at the Capital Centre in Landover, Maryland in 1987. The Commandos did not play in 1988, but returned as the Maryland Commandos the following season. The team moved to Virginia in 1990, again as the Washington Commandos and played at the Patriot Center in Fairfax, Virginia. The team was folded after the 1990 season. Later, Washington Redskins owner Daniel Snyder tried to launch an expansion team called the Washington Warriors, but could not get the trademarks and was eventually abandoned.

On February 10, 2016, The Washington Post and radio station WTOP-FM reported that Monumental Sports & Entertainment were close to a deal in bringing a new Arena Football League expansion franchise to the Capital One Arena. On March 10, 2016, AFL commissioner Scott Butera announced that the deal was finalized and that the new Washington, D.C., team would begin play in 2017. The official website, Facebook and Twitter pages launched on March 15, 2016. On July 14, 2016, the team's name was announced as the Washington Valor with the team's colors being red, white and blue. Jerseys and helmets designs were released on December 10, 2016. Valor owners Monument Sports and Entertainment also acquired a franchise in Baltimore on November 14, 2016. The team's name was later revealed as the Baltimore Brigade. The Valor's first game was on April 7, 2017, in the Verizon Center against the Brigade. The Valor were the first AFL franchise to play in the DC market since the Commandos. On July 28, 2018 the Washington Valor upset the Baltimore Brigade 69–55 at Royal Farms Arena in Baltimore in Arena Bowl XXXI, despite having won only two regular-season games in 2018. Washington QB Arvell Nelson was named the game's Most Valuable Player.

In a January 2019 interview with Forbes, Leonsis noted that the Valor were not particularly successful in regard to finances, and that he mainly used the team and its Baltimore counterpart to experiment with ideas to later use with his more prominent sports properties such as the Wizards, Mystics, and Capitals. Following the 2019 season, the AFL announced it had shut down the operations of local teams and was looking into becoming a traveling league. However, the league filed for bankruptcy and ceased operations entirely in November 2019.

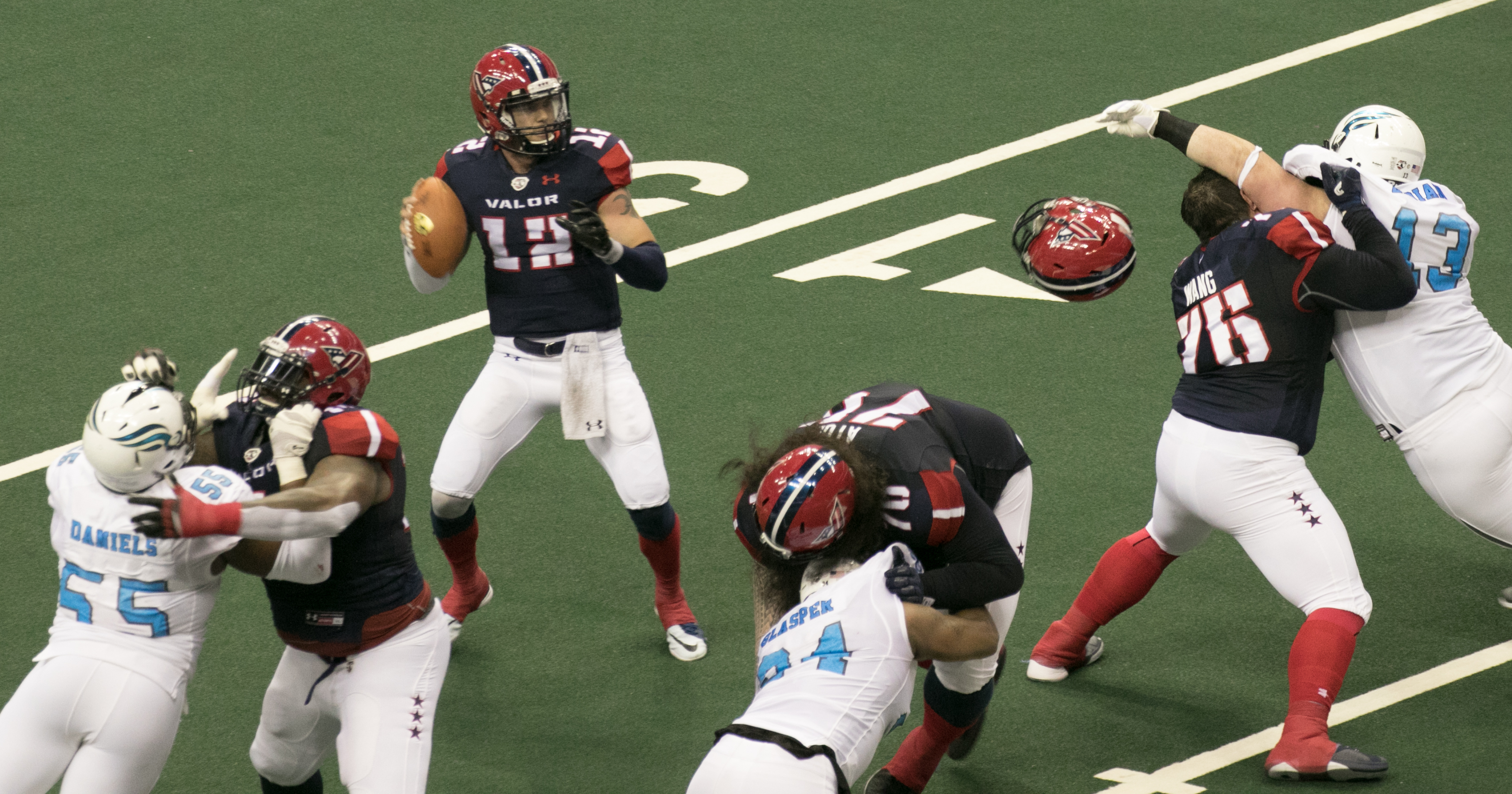
The Valor playing the Philadelphia Soul in 2017

== Coaches and personnel ==
=== Head coaches ===
Name	Term	Regular season			Playoffs			Awards
Name	Term	W	L	Win%	W	L	Win%	Awards
Dean Cokinos	2017–2018	3	15	.167	0	0	–	
Benji McDowell	2018–2019	9	11	.450	2	3	.400	

=== Staff ===
Washington Valor staff
Front office: Chairman – Ted Leonsis; President – Roger Mody	Coaches: Head coach – Benji McDowell; Offensive coordinator – vacant; Defensive coordinator – Benji McDowell; Player coordinator – Cos Dematteo; Strength and conditioning – Ben Jenkins; Team Physician - Dr. Jeffrey Mayer, MD

== Season-by-season results ==
ArenaBowl champions	ArenaBowl appearance	Division champions	Playoff berth

Season	League	Conference	Division	Regular season			Postseason results
Season	League	Conference	Division	Finish	Wins	Losses	Postseason results
Washington Valor
2017	AFL	—	—	5th	3	11	
2018	AFL	—	—	4th	2	10	Won semifinals (Albany); Won ArenaBowl XXXI (Baltimore)
2019	AFL	—	—	2nd	7	5	Lost in Playoffs (Philadelphia)
Total					12	26	(includes only regular season)
Total					2	3	(includes only the postseason)
Total					15	29	(includes both regular season and postseason)

== See also ==
- Washington Commandos
