= Baltimore Brigade =

Arena football team

Logo

General information
- Founded: 2017
- Folded: 2019
- Headquartered: Royal Farms Arena in Baltimore, Maryland
- Colors: Navy blue, silver, light blue, white
- BaltimoreBrigade.com

Personnel
- Owner: Monumental Sports & Entertainment
- CEO: Ted Leonsis
- Head coach: Omarr Smith

Team history
- Baltimore Brigade (2017–2019)

Home fields
- Royal Farms Arena (2017–2019)

League / conference affiliations
- Arena Football League (2017–2019)

Playoff appearances (3)
- 2017, 2018, 2019

The Baltimore Brigade was a professional arena football team based in Baltimore, Maryland, that played in the Arena Football League (AFL) from 2017 to 2019. The team's home arena was the Royal Farms Arena. The franchise was owned by Ted Leonsis through Monumental Sports & Entertainment. After the 2019 season, the entire league ceased operations.

== History ==
The Arena Football League and Monumental Sports & Entertainment both announced on November 14, 2016, that it had granted an expansion franchise to begin play for the 2017 season in Baltimore. Monumental Sports & Entertainment is operated by Ted Leonsis, the majority owner, who had also previously been granted an expansion team in the Washington Valor to begin play the same season. Leonsis purchased the franchise rights from the Baltimore Lightning, an established semi-pro team that had intended to join the AFL.

Although other indoor football leagues have hosted teams in Baltimore in the past (such as the Baltimore Blackbirds and Baltimore Mariners), this is the first Arena Football League franchise to be located in Baltimore, and the first in the state of Maryland since the Washington/Maryland Commandos, a charter league franchise that played in the DC suburb of Landover for its first season.

On December 14, 2016, former Los Angeles KISS coach Omarr Smith was named the team's first head coach.

On January 25, 2017, the team was officially announced as the Baltimore Brigade, named for the military history and in reference to the War of 1812 and the inspiration for the penning of the poem that would later become known as "The Star-Spangled Banner", the U.S.A.'s national anthem.

Number 19 was never issued to any player out of respect to their late Baltimore Colts great Johnny Unitas.

On July 20, 2018, the Brigade reached their first ArenaBowl championship game, ArenaBowl XXXI, after defeating the Philadelphia Soul in the second leg of a two-game aggregate playoff series. They won the first game 57–45 and the second 53–41. In ArenaBowl XXXI, they hosted against the Washington Valor, who scored a 69–55 upset victory.

In a January 2019 interview with Forbes, Leonsis noted that the Brigade was not particularly successful in regard to finances, and that he mainly used the team and its Washington counterpart to experiment with ideas to later use with his more prominent sports properties such as the Wizards, Mystics and Capitals. After the 2019 season, the league initially announced it was ending all local team operations and looking into becoming a traveling league. However, the entire league ceased operations after the AFL filed for bankruptcy in November 2019.

As of 2022, the Brigade's field was being used by the San Diego Strike Force of the Indoor Football League, but has since been replaced. Also, the owners of the Baltimore Lightning International Football Alliance football team claimed to own the intellectual property of the Brigade. However, according to the United States Patent and Trademark Office, the Brigade intellectual property is actually owned by Mike Kwarta, owner of Arena Football One's Albany Firebirds.

== Players ==
=== Individual awards ===
AFL Defensive Lineman of the Year
Season	Player	Position
2017	Khreem Smith	DL

AFL Rookie of the Year
Season	Player	Position
2017	Shane Carden	QB

== Coaches and personnel ==
=== Head coaches ===
Name	Term	Regular season			Playoffs			Awards
Name	Term	W	L	Win%	W	L	Win%	Awards
Omarr Smith	2017–2019	11	15	.423	2	1	.667	2018 AFL Coach of the Year

=== Staff ===
Baltimore Brigade staff
Front office: Chairman – Ted Leonsis	Coaches: Head coach – Omarr Smith; Defensive coordinator/assistant head coach – Walt Housman; Defensive backs/special teams coordinator – Virgil Gray; Assistant – James Roe; Assistant – Scott Bailey

== Season-by-season results ==
ArenaBowl champions	ArenaBowl appearance	Division champions	Playoff berth

Season	League	Conference	Division	Regular season			Postseason results
Season	League	Conference	Division	Finish	Wins	Losses	Postseason results
2017	AFL	—	—	4th	4	10	Lost in Playoffs (Philadelphia)
2018	AFL	—	—	2nd	7	5	Won semifinals (Philadelphia Soul); Lost ArenaBowl XXXI (Washington)
2019	AFL	—	—	2nd	7	5	Lost in Playoffs (Albany)
Total					18	20	(includes only regular season)
Total					2	4	(includes only the postseason)
Total					20	24	(includes both regular season and postseason)
