= 2019 Albany Empire season =

Arena football season

- Head coach: Rob Keefe
- Home stadium: Times Union Center

Results
- Record: 10–2
- League place: 1st
- Playoffs: Semifinals, Won vs. #4 Baltimore ArenaBowl XXXII, Won vs. Philadelphia

The 2019 Albany Empire season was the second season for the Albany Empire in the Arena Football League. The Empire played at the Times Union Center and were coached by Rob Keefe for the 2019 season.

In just their second season of existence, the Empire finished with the best regular season record and advanced to ArenaBowl XXXII, where they defeated the Philadelphia Soul to win their first league championship.

== Standings ==
2019 Arena Football League standings
| Team | Overall | | | Points | | Records | | | |
| Team | W | L | PCT | PF | PA | Home | Away | GB | STK |
|---|---|---|---|---|---|---|---|---|---|
| Albany Empire ^{xy} | 10 | 2 | .833 | 620 | 474 | 5–1 | 5–1 | — | W2 |
| Washington Valor ^{x} | 7 | 5 | .583 | 538 | 552 | 4–2 | 3–3 | 3 | W2 |
| Philadelphia Soul ^{x} | 7 | 5 | .583 | 523 | 530 | 4–2 | 3–3 | 3 | L1 |
| Baltimore Brigade ^{x} | 7 | 5 | .583 | 500 | 439 | 4–2 | 3–3 | 3 | W1 |
| Atlantic City Blackjacks | 4 | 8 | .333 | 518 | 550 | 3–3 | 1–5 | 6 | L2 |
| Columbus Destroyers | 1 | 11 | .083 | 394 | 548 | 1–5 | 0–6 | 9 | L5 |

^{y} - clinched regular season title
^{x} - clinched playoff berth

== Schedule ==
=== Regular season ===
The 2019 regular season schedule was released on February 13, 2019. All times Eastern.

| Week | Day | Date | Kickoff | Opponent | Results | | Location | Attendance | Report |
| Week | Day | Date | Kickoff | Opponent | Score | Record | Location | Attendance | Report |
|---|---|---|---|---|---|---|---|---|---|
| 1 | Saturday | April 27 | 7:00 p.m. | Columbus Destroyers | W 35–19 | 1–0 | Times Union Center | 11,682 | |
| 2 | Saturday | May 4 | 7:30 p.m. | Washington Valor | W 36–27 | 2–0 | Times Union Center | 9,208 | |
| 3 | Saturday | May 11 | 7:00 p.m. | at Philadelphia Soul | W 57–48 | 3–0 | Wells Fargo Center | 9,843 | |
| 4 | Saturday | May 18 | 7:00 p.m. | at Columbus Destroyers | W 56–40 | 4–0 | Nationwide Arena | 7,035 | |
| 5 | Saturday | May 25 | 7:00 p.m. | at Atlantic City Blackjacks | W 54–35 | 5–0 | Boardwalk Hall | 4,386 | |
| 6 | Saturday | June 1 | 3:30 p.m. | Washington Valor | W 58–48 | 6–0 | Times Union Center | 8,744 | |
| 7 | Saturday | June 8 | 7:30 p.m. | Baltimore Brigade | L 41–42 | 6–1 | Times Union Center | 10,287 | |
| 8 | Saturday | June 15 | 7:00 p.m. | at Washington Valor | W 56–55 | 7–1 | Capital One Arena | 7,179 | |
| 9 | Saturday | June 22 | 3:30 p.m. | Atlantic City Blackjacks | W 63–61 | 8–1 | Times Union Center | 9,417 | |
| 10 | Saturday | June 29 | 3:30 p.m. | at Philadelphia Soul | L 43–54 | 8–2 | Wells Fargo Center | 10,564 | |
| 11 | Bye | | | | | | | | |
| 12 | Sunday | July 14 | 3:00 p.m. | at Columbus Destroyers | W 49–18 | 9–2 | Nationwide Arena | 9,275 | |
| 13 | Saturday | July 20 | 7:00 p.m. | Philadelphia Soul | W 72–27 | 10–2 | Times Union Center | 10,981 | |

=== Postseason ===
| Round | Day | Date | Kickoff | Opponent | Score | Location | Attendance | Report |
|---|---|---|---|---|---|---|---|---|
| SF–1 | Saturday | July 27 | 7:00 p.m. | Baltimore Brigade | W 61–26 | Times Union Center | 9,085 | |
| SF–2 | Saturday | August 3 | 7:00 p.m. | at Baltimore Brigade | W 62–21 | Royal Farms Arena | 5,282 | |
| Aggregate score | | | | | W 123–47 | | | |
| ArenaBowl | Sunday | August 11 | 8:00 p.m. | Philadelphia Soul | W 45–27 | Times Union Center | 12,042 | |

== Game summaries ==
Week 1: Columbus (W)

| | 1 | 2 | 3 | 4 | Total |
|---|---|---|---|---|---|
| Columbus | 6 | 0 | 7 | 6 | 19 |
| Albany | 7 | 14 | 14 | 0 | 35 |

Week 2: Washington (W)

| | 1 | 2 | 3 | 4 | Total |
|---|---|---|---|---|---|
| Washington | 7 | 7 | 7 | 6 | 27 |
| Albany | 7 | 14 | 7 | 8 | 36 |

Week 3: at Philadelphia (W)

| | 1 | 2 | 3 | 4 | Total |
|---|---|---|---|---|---|
| Albany | 14 | 14 | 14 | 15 | 57 |
| Philadelphia | 7 | 13 | 14 | 14 | 48 |

Week 4: at Columbus (W)

| | 1 | 2 | 3 | 4 | Total |
|---|---|---|---|---|---|
| Albany | 7 | 21 | 7 | 21 | 56 |
| Columbus | 7 | 7 | 14 | 12 | 40 |

Week 5: at Atlantic City (W)

| | 1 | 2 | 3 | 4 | Total |
|---|---|---|---|---|---|
| Albany | 13 | 14 | 14 | 13 | 54 |
| Atlantic City | 14 | 14 | 0 | 7 | 35 |

Week 6: Washington (W)

| | 1 | 2 | 3 | 4 | Total |
|---|---|---|---|---|---|
| Washington | 12 | 0 | 21 | 15 | 48 |
| Albany | 7 | 23 | 21 | 7 | 58 |

Week 7: Baltimore (L)

| | 1 | 2 | 3 | 4 | Total |
|---|---|---|---|---|---|
| Baltimore | 14 | 14 | 14 | 0 | 42 |
| Albany | 7 | 14 | 14 | 6 | 41 |

Week 8: at Washington (W)

| | 1 | 2 | 3 | 4 | Total |
|---|---|---|---|---|---|
| Albany | 7 | 7 | 21 | 21 | 56 |
| Washington | 14 | 20 | 7 | 14 | 55 |

Week 9: Atlantic City (W)

| | 1 | 2 | 3 | 4 | Total |
|---|---|---|---|---|---|
| Atlantic City | 21 | 14 | 7 | 19 | 61 |
| Albany | 20 | 15 | 7 | 21 | 63 |

Week 10: at Philadelphia (L)

| | 1 | 2 | 3 | 4 | Total |
|---|---|---|---|---|---|
| Albany | 14 | 7 | 0 | 22 | 43 |
| Philadelphia | 7 | 13 | 14 | 20 | 54 |

Week 12: at Columbus (W)

| | 1 | 2 | 3 | 4 | Total |
|---|---|---|---|---|---|
| Albany | 21 | 14 | 7 | 7 | 49 |
| Columbus | 6 | 6 | 0 | 6 | 18 |

Week 13: Philadelphia (W)

| | 1 | 2 | 3 | 4 | Total |
|---|---|---|---|---|---|
| Philadelphia | 7 | 13 | 0 | 7 | 27 |
| Albany | 14 | 16 | 21 | 21 | 72 |

Semifinal, Leg 1: Baltimore (W)

| | 1 | 2 | 3 | 4 | Total |
|---|---|---|---|---|---|
| Baltimore | 6 | 0 | 7 | 13 | 26 |
| Albany | 7 | 14 | 20 | 20 | 61 |

Semifinal, Leg 2: at Baltimore (W)

| | 1 | 2 | 3 | 4 | Total |
|---|---|---|---|---|---|
| Albany | 21 | 28 | 6 | 7 | 62 |
| Baltimore | 7 | 0 | 7 | 7 | 21 |

ArenaBowl XXXII: Philadelphia (W)

| | 1 | 2 | 3 | 4 | Total |
|---|---|---|---|---|---|
| Philadelphia | 14 | 7 | 0 | 6 | 27 |
| Albany | 14 | 21 | 7 | 3 | 45 |

== Roster ==
Albany Empire roster
| Quarterbacks: 15 Mason Espinosa; 4 Tommy Grady; Fullbacks: 9 Mykel Benson; Wide receivers: 14 Christian Briggs; 7 Malachi Jones; 18 Quentin Sims; 2 D. J. Stephens; 11 Collin Taylor | Offensive linemen: 68 Ryan Cave; 70 Jordan Mudge; 93 Moqut Ruffins; 53 Jakobi Smith; Defensive linemen: 90 Harold Brantley; 92 Calvin France; 5 Rodney Fritz; 95 Antonio Guerad; 3 Jeramie Richardson; 1 Joe Sykes | Linebackers: 8 Terence Moore; Defensive backs: 24 Arkeith Brown; 6 Tevin Homer; 13 Juwan Offray; 10 Terrance Smith; Kickers: 12 Adrian Trevino | Reserve lists: -- Jack Bramswig WR (IR); -- Troy Grant WR (IR); 75 Hayworth Hicks OL (IR); -- Christian Love DB (Susp.); -- Quinn McQueary QB (IR); 23 Brad Muhammad DB (IR); -- Cheatham Norrils DB (IR); 91 Brandon Sesay DL (IR); -- Monte Taylor DL (IR); 94 Aaron Tiller DL (IR); Recallable reassignment: 21 A. J. Coney WR; -- Jameer Outsey DL; Rookies in italics Roster updated May 16, 2019; 24 Active, 12 Inactive |
