= 2019 Columbus Destroyers season =

Arena football season

- Head coach: Matthew Sauk
- Home stadium: Nationwide Arena

Results
- Record: 1–11
- League place: 6th

The 2019 Columbus Destroyers season was the 11th and last season for the franchise in the Arena Football League, their sixth season in Columbus, and their first season following a 10-year hiatus. The Destroyers played their home games at Nationwide Arena and were coached by Matthew Sauk for the 2019 season.

== Standings ==
2019 Arena Football League standings
Team	Overall			Points		Records			
Team	W	L	PCT	PF	PA	Home	Away	GB	STK
Albany Empire ^{xy}	10	2	.833	620	474	5–1	5–1	—	W2
Washington Valor ^{x}	7	5	.583	538	552	4–2	3–3	3	W2
Philadelphia Soul ^{x}	7	5	.583	523	530	4–2	3–3	3	L1
Baltimore Brigade ^{x}	7	5	.583	500	439	4–2	3–3	3	W1
Atlantic City Blackjacks	4	8	.333	518	550	3–3	1–5	6	L2
Columbus Destroyers	1	11	.083	394	548	1–5	0–6	9	L5

^{y} - clinched regular season title
^{x} - clinched playoff berth

== Schedule ==
=== Regular season ===
The 2019 regular season schedule was released on February 13, 2019. All times Eastern.

Week	Day	Date	Kickoff	Opponent	Results		Location	Attendance	Report
Week	Day	Date	Kickoff	Opponent	Score	Record	Location	Attendance	Report
1	Saturday	April 27, 2019	7:00 p.m.	at Albany Empire	L 19–35	0–1	Times Union Center	11,682	
2	Saturday	May 4, 2019	3:30 p.m.	at Atlantic City Blackjacks	L 35–42	0–2	Boardwalk Hall	6,139	
3	Friday	May 10, 2019	7:00 p.m.	at Baltimore Brigade	L 30–48	0–3	Royal Farms Arena	4,990	
4	Saturday	May 18, 2019	7:00 p.m.	Albany Empire	L 40–56	0–4	Nationwide Arena	7,035	
5	Saturday	May 25, 2019	3:30 p.m.	Washington Valor	L 27–29	0–5	Nationwide Arena	6,122	
6	Saturday	June 1, 2019	7:00 p.m.	at Philadelphia Soul	L 35–47	0–6	Wells Fargo Center	8,672	
7	Friday	June 7, 2019	7:00 p.m.	Atlantic City Blackjacks	W 54–50	1–6	Nationwide Arena	6,029	
8	Saturday	June 15, 2019	3:30 p.m.	Baltimore Brigade	L 39–44	1–7	Nationwide Arena	6,260	
9	Saturday	June 22, 2019	7:00 p.m.	Philadelphia Soul	L 35–42	1–8	Nationwide Arena	7,604	
10	Friday	June 28, 2019	7:00 p.m.	at Baltimore Brigade	L 12–50	1–9	Royal Farms Arena	4,206	
11	Bye								
12	Sunday	July 14, 2019	3:00 p.m.	Albany Empire	L 18–49	1–10	Nationwide Arena	9,275	
13	Saturday	July 20, 2019	3:30 p.m.	at Washington Valor	L 50–56	1–11	Capital One Arena	8,456	

== Game summaries ==
Week 1: at Albany (L)

	1	2	3	4	Total
Columbus	6	0	7	6	19
Albany	7	14	14	0	35

Week 2: at Atlantic City (L)

	1	2	3	4	Total
Columbus	13	7	0	15	35
Atlantic City	7	14	7	14	42

Week 3: at Baltimore (L)

	1	2	3	4	Total
Columbus	0	10	13	7	30
Baltimore	7	14	7	20	48

Week 4: Albany (L)

	1	2	3	4	Total
Albany	7	21	7	21	56
Columbus	7	7	14	12	40

Week 5: Washington (L)

	1	2	3	4	Total
Washington	0	7	14	8	29
Columbus	14	7	3	3	27

Week 6: at Philadelphia (L)

	1	2	3	4	Total
Columbus	7	7	0	21	35
Philadelphia	13	6	14	14	47

Week 7: Atlantic City (W)

	1	2	3	4	Total
Atlantic City	0	21	14	15	50
Columbus	14	13	7	20	54

Week 8: Baltimore (L)

	1	2	3	4	Total
Baltimore	13	7	14	10	44
Columbus	13	7	7	12	39

Week 9: Philadelphia (L)

	1	2	3	4	Total
Philadelphia	7	20	0	15	42
Columbus	7	14	7	7	35

Week 10: at Baltimore (L)

	1	2	3	4	Total
Columbus	0	12	0	0	12
Baltimore	7	14	15	14	50

Week 12: Albany (L)

	1	2	3	4	Total
Albany	21	14	7	7	49
Columbus	6	6	0	6	18

Week 13: at Washington (L)

	1	2	3	4	Total
Columbus	13	14	14	9	50
Washington	13	14	7	22	56

== Roster ==
Columbus Destroyers roster
Quarterbacks: 4 Liam Nadler; 12 Grant Russell; 7 Kyle Rowley; Fullbacks: 44 Faleaoga Russell; Wide receivers: 9 Fabian Guerra; 13 Paul Revis; 5 Tony Stevens; 17 Jenson Stoshak; 7 Domonique Young; 5 Tyler Palka	Offensive linemen: 75 Nathan Isles; 65 Tuni Kanuch; 25 Miles Mason; 43 Lene Maiava; 73 Tait Leavitt; Defensive linemen: 8 K. C. Obi; 6 Sydney Omameh; 99 Nick Seither; 58 Khreem Smith; 50 Derrick Summers; 67 Terrance Taylor	Linebackers: 11 Anthony Clark; 21 Aaron Ivory; Defensive backs: 10 Varmah Sonie; 1 Brandon Stephens; 23 LaRico Stevenson; Kickers: 19 Craig Peterson; 92 Tyler Durbin	Reserve lists: 15 Kenny Cook WR (IR); -- Jordan Gandy WR (IR); -- Randall Harris OL (DNR); 43 Jovann Letuli OL (Susp.); -- Julian Lowe WR (IR); 2 Donovan Morgan WR (IR); -- K. J. Morton DB (IR); -- Trevon Saunders WR (IR); 7 Danny Southwick QB (Susp.); 11 Jordan Thomas DB (IR); -- Robert Wheelwright WR (DNR); Recallable reassignment: 5 Anthony Amos WR; 65 Daronte Bouldin OL; 11 Alex Gray DB; Rookies in italics Roster updated May 16, 2019; 24 Active, 14 Inactive → More rosters
