= 2019 Atlantic City Blackjacks season =

Arena football season

- Owner: Trifecta Sports and Entertainment
- Head coach: Ron James
- Home stadium: Boardwalk Hall

Results
- Record: 4–8
- League place: 5th

The 2019 Atlantic City Blackjacks season was the only season for the Atlantic City Blackjacks in the Arena Football League. The Blackjacks played their home games at Boardwalk Hall and were coached by Ron James for the 2019 season.

== Roster ==
Atlantic City Blackjacks roster
| Quarterbacks: 12 Randy Hippeard; 8 Warren Smith; Fullbacks: Currently vacant; Wide receivers: 11 LaMark Brown; 5 Antwane Grant; 17 Kendrick Ings; 2 Denzel Keyes; 3 Rashad Still | Offensive linemen: 69 Leonardo Bates; 63 Glen Haisley; -- Fred Ruff; 50 Raymond McNeil; Defensive linemen: 91 Antron Dillon; 50 Tre James; 90 Monte Lewis; 97 Donte Rumph; 7 Lynden Trail | Linebackers: 47 Nick Haag; 13 Wesley Mauia; Defensive backs: 24 Arthur Hobbs; 4 LaRoche Jackson; 6 Keiron Jones; 23 Kiante Northington; 1 Marvin Ross; Kickers: 18 Mark Lewis | Reserve lists: -- Paul Browning WR (IR); 2 Tyron Laughinghouse WR (IR); 72 Cornelius Lewis OL (IR); -- Lawrence Martin OL (Susp.); -- Warren Oliver WR (Susp.); -- Marquez Williams FB (IR); Recallable reassignment: Currently vacant; Rookies in italics Roster updated May 16, 2019; 24 Active, 6 Inactive → More rosters |

== Standings ==
2019 Arena Football League standings
| Team | Overall | | | Points | | Records | | | |
| Team | W | L | PCT | PF | PA | Home | Away | GB | STK |
|---|---|---|---|---|---|---|---|---|---|
| Albany Empire ^{xy} | 10 | 2 | .833 | 620 | 474 | 5–1 | 5–1 | — | W2 |
| Washington Valor ^{x} | 7 | 5 | .583 | 538 | 552 | 4–2 | 3–3 | 3 | W2 |
| Philadelphia Soul ^{x} | 7 | 5 | .583 | 523 | 530 | 4–2 | 3–3 | 3 | L1 |
| Baltimore Brigade ^{x} | 7 | 5 | .583 | 500 | 439 | 4–2 | 3–3 | 3 | W1 |
| Atlantic City Blackjacks | 4 | 8 | .333 | 518 | 550 | 3–3 | 1–5 | 6 | L2 |
| Columbus Destroyers | 1 | 11 | .083 | 394 | 548 | 1–5 | 0–6 | 9 | L5 |

^{y} - clinched regular season title
^{x} - clinched playoff berth

== Schedule ==
=== Regular season ===
The 2019 regular season schedule was released on February 13, 2019. All times Eastern.

| Week | Day | Date | Kickoff | Opponent | Results | | Location | Attendance | Report |
| Week | Day | Date | Kickoff | Opponent | Score | Record | Location | Attendance | Report |
|---|---|---|---|---|---|---|---|---|---|
| 1 | Saturday | April 27, 2019 | 3:30 p.m. | at Philadelphia Soul | L 41–48 | 0–1 | Wells Fargo Center | 9,245 | |
| 2 | Saturday | May 4, 2019 | 3:30 p.m. | Columbus Destroyers | W 42–35 | 1–1 | Boardwalk Hall | 6,139 | |
| 3 | Saturday | May 11, 2019 | 7:00 p.m. | at Washington Valor | L 34–41 | 1–2 | Capital One Arena | 8,044 | |
| 4 | Saturday | May 18, 2019 | 7:00 p.m. | Baltimore Brigade | W 48–41 | 2–2 | Boardwalk Hall | 4,054 | |
| 5 | Saturday | May 25, 2019 | 7:00 p.m. | Albany Empire | L 35–54 | 2–3 | Boardwalk Hall | 4,386 | |
| 6 | Saturday | June 1, 2019 | 3:30 p.m. | Baltimore Brigade | W 35–34 | 3–3 | Boardwalk Hall | 4,632 | |
| 7 | Friday | June 7, 2019 | 7:00 p.m. | at Columbus Destroyers | L 50–54 | 3–4 | Nationwide Arena | 6,029 | |
| 8 | Sunday | June 16, 2019 | 4:00 p.m. | at Philadelphia Soul | L 29–54 | 3–5 | Wells Fargo Center | 6,910 | |
| 9 | Saturday | June 22, 2019 | 3:30 p.m. | at Albany Empire | L 61–63 | 3–6 | Times Union Center | 9,417 | |
| 10 | Saturday | June 29, 2019 | 7:00 p.m. | at Washington Valor | W 70–41 | 4–6 | Capital One Arena | 7,136 | |
| 11 | Saturday | July 6, 2019 | 7:00 p.m. | Philadelphia Soul | L 45–50 | 4–7 | Boardwalk Hall | 7,104 | |
| 12 | Bye | | | | | | | | |
| 13 | Sunday | July 21, 2019 | 4:00 p.m. | Baltimore Brigade | L 28–35 | 4–8 | Boardwalk Hall | 6,266 | |

== Game summaries ==
Week 1: at Philadelphia (L)

| | 1 | 2 | 3 | 4 | Total |
|---|---|---|---|---|---|
| Atlantic City | 14 | 13 | 7 | 7 | 41 |
| Philadelphia | 7 | 13 | 14 | 14 | 48 |

Week 2: Columbus (W)

| | 1 | 2 | 3 | 4 | Total |
|---|---|---|---|---|---|
| Columbus | 13 | 7 | 0 | 15 | 35 |
| Atlantic City | 7 | 14 | 7 | 14 | 42 |

Week 3: at Washington (L)

| | 1 | 2 | 3 | 4 | Total |
|---|---|---|---|---|---|
| Atlantic City | 0 | 7 | 14 | 13 | 34 |
| Washington | 6 | 14 | 7 | 14 | 41 |

Week 4: Baltimore (W)

| | 1 | 2 | 3 | 4 | Total |
|---|---|---|---|---|---|
| Baltimore | 0 | 13 | 6 | 22 | 41 |
| Atlantic City | 13 | 7 | 7 | 21 | 48 |

Week 5: Albany (L)

| | 1 | 2 | 3 | 4 | Total |
|---|---|---|---|---|---|
| Albany | 13 | 14 | 14 | 13 | 54 |
| Columbus | 14 | 14 | 0 | 7 | 35 |

Week 6: Baltimore (W)

| | 1 | 2 | 3 | 4 | Total |
|---|---|---|---|---|---|
| Baltimore | 7 | 20 | 7 | 0 | 34 |
| Atlantic City | 7 | 14 | 14 | 0 | 35 |

Week 7: at Columbus (L)

| | 1 | 2 | 3 | 4 | Total |
|---|---|---|---|---|---|
| Atlantic City | 0 | 21 | 14 | 15 | 50 |
| Columbus | 14 | 13 | 7 | 20 | 54 |

Week 8: at Philadelphia (L)

| | 1 | 2 | 3 | 4 | Total |
|---|---|---|---|---|---|
| Atlantic City | 0 | 14 | 0 | 15 | 29 |
| Philadelphia | 13 | 14 | 14 | 13 | 54 |

Week 9: at Albany (L)

| | 1 | 2 | 3 | 4 | Total |
|---|---|---|---|---|---|
| Atlantic City | 21 | 14 | 7 | 19 | 61 |
| Albany | 20 | 15 | 7 | 21 | 63 |

Week 10: at Washington (W)

| | 1 | 2 | 3 | 4 | Total |
|---|---|---|---|---|---|
| Atlantic City | 14 | 21 | 14 | 21 | 70 |
| Washington | 7 | 21 | 7 | 6 | 41 |

Week 11: Philadelphia (L)

| | 1 | 2 | 3 | 4 | Total |
|---|---|---|---|---|---|
| Philadelphia | 14 | 6 | 7 | 23 | 50 |
| Atlantic City | 7 | 9 | 7 | 22 | 45 |

Week 13: Baltimore (L)

| | 1 | 2 | 3 | 4 | Total |
|---|---|---|---|---|---|
| Baltimore | 0 | 21 | 0 | 14 | 35 |
| Atlantic City | 0 | 7 | 7 | 14 | 28 |
