= Liam Nadler =

American football player (born 1992)

Profile
- Position: Quarterback

Personal information
- Born: November 29, 1992 (age 33)
- Listed height: 6 ft 5 in (1.96 m)
- Listed weight: 240 lb (109 kg)

Career information
- High school: Leipsic (Leipsic, Ohio)
- College: Gannon (2011–2015)
- NFL draft: 2016: undrafted

Career history
- Colorado Crush (2017); Sioux City Bandits (2018); Columbus Destroyers (2019)

Awards and highlights
- Third-team All-American (2014); 2× Second-team All-PSAC West (2013–2014)
- Stats at ArenaFan.com

Liam Nadler (born November 29, 1992) is an American former football quarterback. He played college football for the Gannon Golden Knights, and broke nearly every school passing record. He was named a third-team All-American in 2014. Nadler was also one of 22 college football players selected to the 2015 Allstate AFCA Good Works Team, which includes players from all levels of college football. He was a National Football League (NFL) prospect but never signed with an NFL team. He later played professionally for the Colorado Crush of the Indoor Football League (IFL), the Sioux City Bandits of Champions Indoor Football (CIF), and the Columbus Destroyers of the Arena Football League (AFL). He was inducted into Gannon's athletics hall of fame in 2025.

== Early life ==
Liam Nadler was born on November 29, 1992. He played high school football at Leipsic High School in Leipsic, Ohio. He started out as a tight end and wide receiver. Nadler played quarterback from his sophomore to senior seasons. As a junior in 2009, he helped Leipsic High win their first Blanchard Valley Conference title since 1994. He earned first-team all-district and first-team all-conference honors during his high school career. Nadler was also a four-year letterman in basketball, garnering all-district and all-league recognition. Nadler graduated from Leipsic High in 2011.

== College career ==
Nadler accepted a scholarship to play college football for the Gannon Golden Knights of Gannon University. He redshirted in 2011 and was named a Pennsylvania State Athletic Conference (PSAC) Scholar-Athlete. He started every game his redshirt freshman year in 2012, setting school single-season records in completions with 242, passing attempts with 428, passing yards with 2,910, and passing touchdowns with 21. He also threw 21 interceptions, and was named a PSAC Scholar-Athlete for the second consecutive season. Nadler started every game for the second straight year in 2013, completing 224 of 377 passes for 2,859 yards, 16 touchdowns, and 13 interceptions while also rushing for 14 touchdowns. He earned second-team PSAC Western Division and PSAC Scholar-Athlete honors for the 2013 season. He started every game for the third straight year in 2014, recording 199 completions on 318 passing attempts for 2,750 yards, 21 touchdowns, and four interceptions, and 12 rushing touchdowns while leading the PSAC in total offense per game with 313.6 yards. For the 2014 season, Nadler earned Don Hansen Football Gazette third-team All-American, Beyond Sports Network honorable mention All-American, second-team PSAC Western Division, second-team Capital One Academic All-American, second-team CoSIDA Academic All-American, and PSAC Scholar-Athlete honors. He also broke the school's career passing record during his junior season with 8,519 yards. As a redshirt senior in 2015, he started every game for the fourth consecutive season, completing 186 of 337 passes for 2,641 yards, 24 touchdowns, and six interceptions while also scoring two rushing touchdowns. In September 2015, he was one of 22 college football players selected to the 2015 Allstate AFCA Good Works Team, which includes players from all levels of college football. Nadler was also named a second-team CoSIDA Academic All-American for the second consecutive season.

Nadler finished his college career with nearly every passing record in Gannon history. He set school career records in completions with 851, passing attempts with 1,460, completion percentage with 58.3%, passing yards with 11,160, passing touchdowns with 82, total offense with 11,863 yards, and starting quarterback wins with 23. His 308 passes without an interception from 2014 to 2015 set the NCAA Division II record. He was also a three-year team captain from 2013 to 2015. Nadler was inducted into Gannon's athletics hall of fame in 2025.

== Professional career ==
After his senior year, Nadler played in the 2016 Dream Bowl for college football all-stars. His pro day was at Temple University. On April 14, 2016, it was reported that the Houston Texans, Pittsburgh Steelers, San Diego Chargers, New York Jets, Philadelphia Eagles, and Seattle Seahawks had shown interest in Nadler. The company Sage produced several draft prospect football cards of Nadler. Scouts were interested in his size (6 feet 5 inches (1.96 m), 232 pounds (105 kg)) and speed (he had a 4.89 second 40-yard dash at Temple's pro day). One scout reportedly called him a "poor-man's Carson Wentz". Lance Zierlein of NFL.com said Nadler was a "Four-year starter who had solid production against lower level of competition, but was a product of the scheme. Doesn't have an NFL arm to go along with his NFL-caliber size. Possesses leadership qualities scouts like, but likely not enough traits to get much of a look on the next level." He was rated the 29th best quarterback in the 2016 NFL draft by NFLDraftScout.com. After going undrafted, Nadler attended rookie minicamp with the Jets on a tryout basis.

Nadler played for the Colorado Crush of the Indoor Football League (IFL) in 2017, throwing for 1,114 yards and 28 touchdowns. He was named the IFL Offensive Player of the Week for Week 10 of the 2017 season after recording 273 passing yards, seven passing touchdowns, and two rushing touchdowns in a 77–73 victory against the Wichita Falls Nighthawks. The Crush folded after the season.

Nadler played for the Sioux City Bandits of Champions Indoor Football in 2018, throwing for 1,827 yards, 42 touchdowns and eight interceptions. He led the Bandits to a 9–3 record and an appearance in Champions Bowl IV, where they lost to the Duke City Gladiators by a score of 31–27.

Nadler was assigned to the Columbus Destroyers of the Arena Football League (AFL) on April 10, 2019. He was placed on recallable reassignment on April 16. He was later assigned to Columbus again on May 2, placed on recallable reassignment on June 19, and activated from recallable reassignment on June 20. Nadler saw his first significant AFL action in Week 12 against the Albany Empire. He entered the game in the second quarter in relief of injured starter Grant Russell. Nadler completed 13 of 22 passes for 147 yards and one touchdown as Columbus lost 49–18. The Destroyers signed Kyle Rowley to start the regular season finale in Week 13, keeping Nadler in a backup role. Overall during the 2019 season, Nadler completed 15 of 26 passes (57.7%) for 157 yards and one touchdown while also rushing three times for negative seven yards.

== Personal life ==
Nadler majored in political science at Gannon, and graduated with a bachelor's degree in 2014. He later began running Nadler Farms. He has a wife and two children.
