= Jeramie Richardson =

American football player (born 1983)

No. 4, 3, 33
- Position: Fullback

Personal information
- Born: December 6, 1983 (age 42); San Antonio, Texas, U.S.
- Listed height: 6 ft 1 in (1.85 m)
- Listed weight: 240 lb (109 kg)

Career information
- High school: O'Connor (Helotes, Texas)
- College: Angelo State
- NFL draft: 2005: undrafted

Career history
- San Angelo Stampede Express (2010); Utah Blaze (2011)*; West Texas Roughnecks (2011); Cleveland Gladiators (2012); Orlando Predators (2013); New Orleans VooDoo (2013); San Antonio Talons (2014); Cleveland Gladiators (2015); Philadelphia Soul (2016); Cleveland Gladiators (2017); Philadelphia Soul (2018); Albany Empire (AFL) (2019); Albany Empire (NAL) (2020–2022)
- * Offseason or practice squad member only

Awards and highlights
- 2× ArenaBowl champion (2016, 2019); First-team All-Arena (2018); 2× Second-team All-Arena (2016, 2017)

Career AFL statistics
- Rush attempts: 218
- Rushing yards: 596
- Rushing touchdowns: 53
- Tackles: 112.5
- Sacks: 7.5
- Stats at ArenaFan.com

Jeramie Richardson (born December 6, 1983) is an American former professional football fullback who played in the Arena Football League (AFL). He played college football at Angelo State University.

== Professional career ==
In 2010, he was a member of the San Angelo Stampede Express of the Indoor Football League (IFL).

In 2011, he was a member of the Utah Blaze of the Arena Football League (AFL).

Richardson played for the IFL's West Texas Roughnecks in 2011, and was named second team All-IFL.

In 2012, he was a member of the AFL's Cleveland Gladiators.

Richardson was assigned to the Orlando Predators of the AFL in 2013, but he reassigned after the Predators 0–5 start.

Richardson was assigned to the AFL's New Orleans VooDoo before Week 6 of the 2013 season.

Richardson was assigned to the San Antonio Talons of the AFL on January 30, 2014.

Richardson was assigned to the Gladiators again on March 21. 2015. On November 6, 2015, Richardson was placed on reassignment.

On December 8, 2015, Richardson was assigned to the Philadelphia Soul of the AFL.

On May 18, 2017, Richardson was assigned to the Gladiators for this third stint with the team. He earned second-team All-Arena honors in 2017.

On March 23, 2018, Richardson was assigned to the Soul again.

On March 14, 2019, Richardson was assigned to the AFL's Albany Empire
