= Brad Muhammad =

American gridiron football player (born 1995)

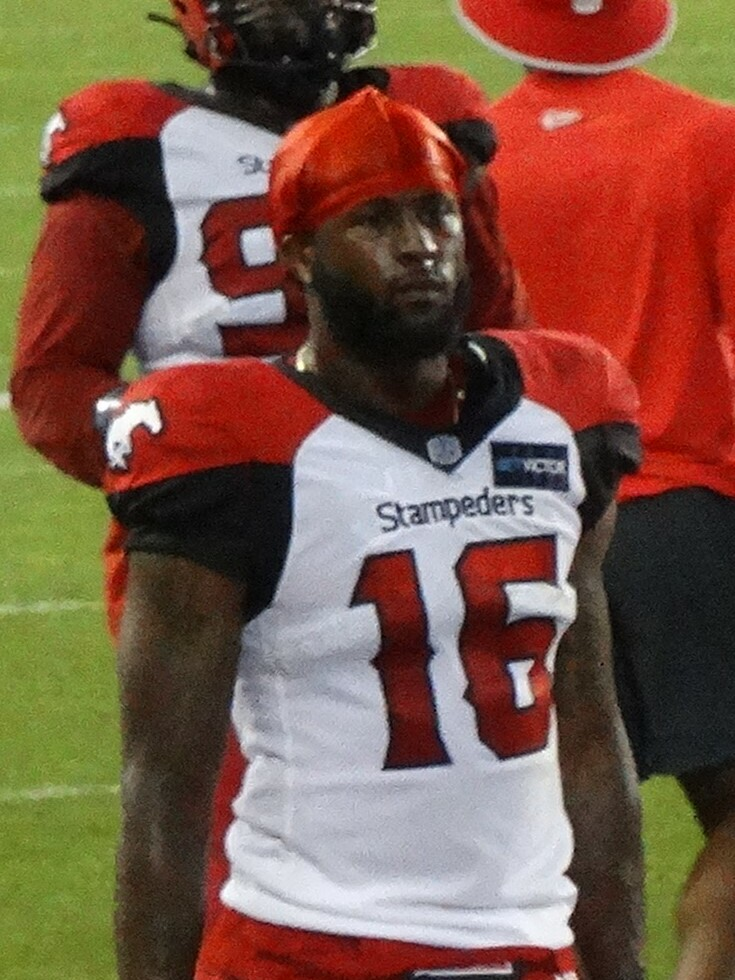
- Muhammad with the Calgary Stampeders in 2022

Profile
- Position: Defensive back

Personal information
- Born: July 18, 1995 (age 31); St. Petersburg, Florida, U.S.
- Listed height: 5 ft 10 in (1.78 m)
- Listed weight: 184 lb (83 kg)

Career information
- High school: Admiral Farragut Academy
- College: Florida International

Career history
- 2018–2019: Cedar Rapids River Kings*
- 2019: Albany Empire
- 2020–2022: Ottawa Redblacks
- 2022: Calgary Stampeders
- 2023: Winnipeg Blue Bombers*
- 2023: Calgary Stampeders
- * Offseason or practice squad member only

Awards and highlights
- ArenaBowl champion (2019); Second-team All-Conference USA (2017)
- Stats at CFL.ca

Brad Hyman-Muhammad (born July 18, 1995) is an American professional football defensive back. He played college football at Florida International. Muhammad was a member of the Cedar Rapids River Kings, Albany Empire, Ottawa Redblacks, Calgary Stampeders, and Winnipeg Blue Bombers.

== Early life ==
Muhammad was born in St. Petersburg, Florida to his mother Tirica Greene and father Brad Hyman. He attended Admiral Farragut Academy, a private college prep school in St. Petersburg, where he played football, basketball, baseball, and ran track.

In football, Muhammad primarily played wide receiver, while also seeing action at cornerback and as a kick returner. As a senior, Muhammad caught 45 passes for 904 yards and 11 touchdowns. He was named to the Class 2A All-State first-team, but was underrecruited by colleges. Charleston Southern was the only school to offer Muhammad a scholarship, but it expired after the team filled up with defensive backs. Muhammad did not sign with a school, and opted to walk-on at Florida International after enrolling.

== College career ==
Muhammad enrolled at FIU over the summer and joined the football team as a walk-on one week before training camp started in 2013. Nevertheless, Muhammad stood out to the coaching staff, and was quickly elevated to second-team defense. Seven games into his freshman season, Muhammad slept through a walk-through practice, and was dismissed for the rest of the season by head coach Ron Turner. Oversleeping the practice was just one incident in what Muhammad described as a general pattern of tardiness. But despite his dismissal, Muhammad remained committed to eventually rejoining the team, attending practices in addition to going to class and picking up a job at the campus Starbucks.

His outlook on rejoining the team changed in 2016, when Turner was fired and Butch Davis was hired in his place. In the summer of 2017, he was allowed to practice with the team after a discussion between Davis, Muhammad, and his family. In August 2017, Muhammad was awarded a scholarship. In his senior season, Muhammad played in all 13 games, making 53 tackles and tallying four interceptions, one of which he returned for a touchdown. After the season, he earned second-team all-Conference USA honors. Muhammad graduated with a degree in interdisciplinary studies.

== Professional career ==
=== Cedar Rapids River Kings ===
In November 2018, Muhammad was signed by the Cedar Rapids River Kings of the Indoor Football League, but never made an appearance for the team.

=== Albany Empire ===
Muhammad signed with the Albany Empire in 2019 after impressing at a tryout camp in Orlando. In four games, Muhammad made 12 tackles, broke up two passes, and caught one interception.

He was subsequently placed on injured reserve, where he spent the remainder of the year. The 2019 season culminated with Muhammad and the Empire winning ArenaBowl XXXII.

=== Ottawa Redblacks ===
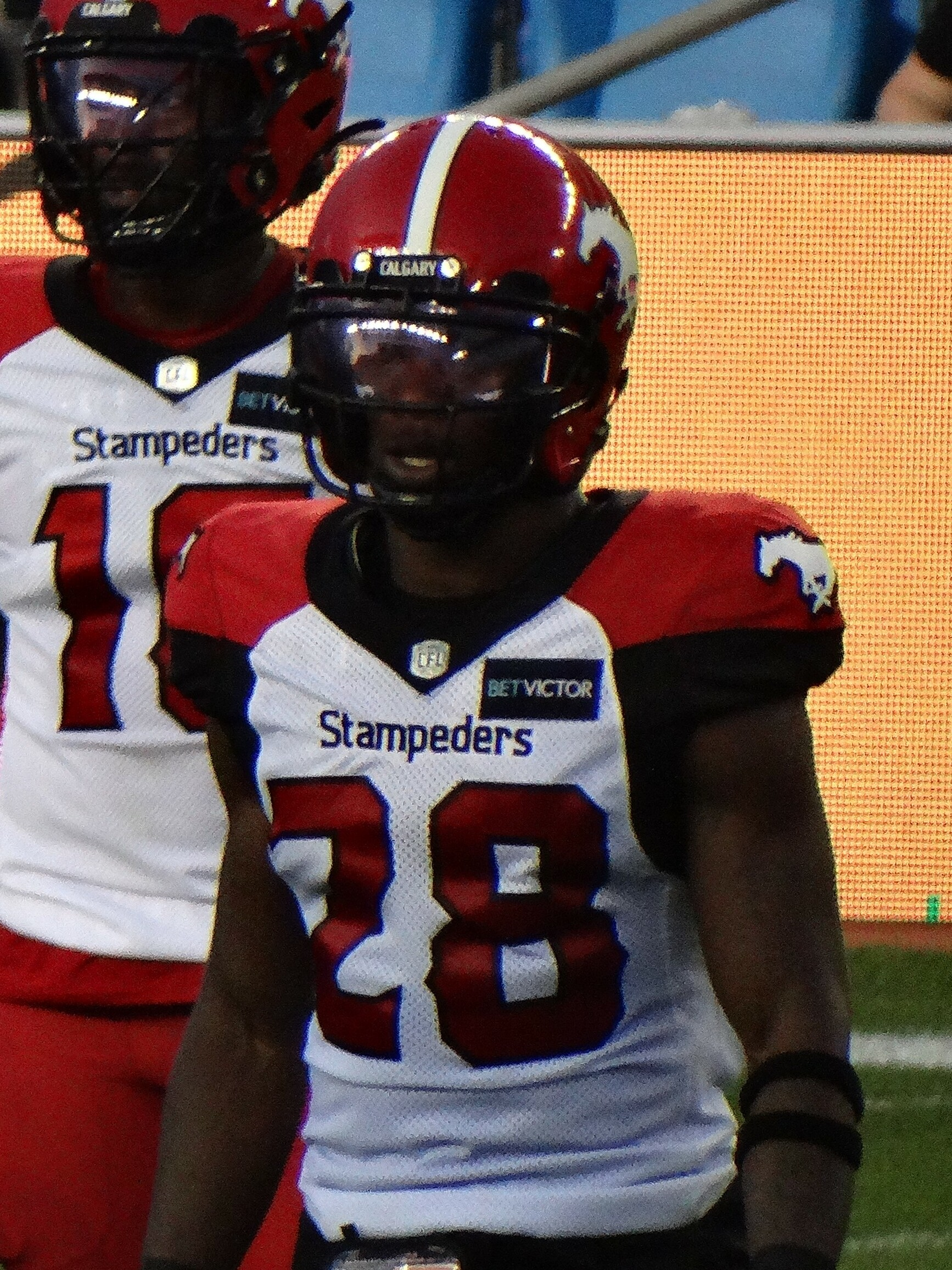
Muhammad with the Stampeders in 2022

On February 18, 2020, Muhammad was signed by the Ottawa Redblacks of the Canadian Football League. After the CFL canceled the 2020 season due to the COVID-19 pandemic, he chose to opt-out of his contract with the Redblacks on September 3, 2020. He opted back in to his contract on December 22, 2020. Muhammad played in five games for the Redblacks in 2021, contributing with 14 defensive tackles. Following the season he was not re-signed and became a free agent in February 2022.

=== Calgary Stampeders (first stint) ===
On April 6, 2022, Muhammad signed with the Calgary Stampeders. He played in 16 regular season games where he had 50 defensive tackles, two interceptions, and one force fumble. Following the 2023 preseason, he was released on June 3, 2023.

=== Winnipeg Blue Bombers ===
On June 12, 2023, it was announced that Muhammad had signed with the practice roster of the Winnipeg Blue Bombers. He was released on July 18, 2023.

=== Calgary Stampeders (second stint) ===
Muhammad was signed to the practice roster of the Stampeders on July 25, 2023. He dressed in eight games, starting six, for the Stampeders in 2023. He was released on June 2, 2024.
