= D. J. Stephens (American football) =

American football player (born 1990)

No. 1, 4, 11, 3, 2
- Position: Wide receiver

Personal information
- Born: September 9, 1990 (age 36)
- Listed height: 5 ft 11 in (1.80 m)
- Listed weight: 180 lb (82 kg)

Career information
- High school: John F. Kennedy (Los Angeles, California)
- College: Arkansas-Monticello
- NFL draft: 2012: undrafted

Career history
- San Antonio Talons (2012–2014); San Jose SaberCats (2015); Los Angeles Kiss (2016); Baltimore Brigade (2018); Albany Empire (2019)

Awards and highlights
- 2× ArenaBowl champion (2015, 2019)

Career AFL statistics
- Receptions: 242
- Receiving yards: 3,272
- Receiving TDs: 57
- Return yards: 1,610
- Return TDs: 5
- Stats at ArenaFan.com

Demetres J. Stephens (born September 9, 1990) is an American former professional football wide receiver who played in the Arena Football League (AFL). He played college football at the University of Arkansas-Monticello. He was signed as an undrafted free agent by the San Antonio Talons in 2012.

== Early life ==
Stephens attended John F. Kennedy High School in Los Angeles, California.

== Professional career ==
=== San Antonio Talons ===
Stephens was assigned to the San Antonio Talons of the Arena Football League (AFL) in 2012.

=== San Jose SaberCats ===
On April 7, 2015, Stephens was assigned to the San Jose SaberCats.

=== Los Angeles KISS ===
On December 18, 2015, Stephens was assigned to the Los Angeles KISS.

=== Baltimore Brigade ===
On June 7, 2018, Stephens was assigned to the Baltimore Brigade.

=== Albany Empire ===
On March 13, 2019, Stephens was assigned to the Albany Empire.
