= Sydney Omameh =

American musician and football player

Profile
- Position: Defensive lineman

Personal information
- Born: February 21, 1993 (age 33); Columbus, Ohio, U.S
- Listed height: 6 ft 4 in (1.93 m)
- Listed weight: 245 lb (111 kg)

Career information
- High school: William Mason High School
- College: Ohio Dominion; Grand Valley State

Career history
- Ottawa Redblacks (2018)*; Columbus Destroyers (2019)
- * Offseason or practice squad member only

Awards and highlights
- Second Team All-GLIAC (2013); First Team All-Ohio Division II (2013); Daktronics All-Super Region Four team Squad (2014)
- Stats at ArenaFan.com

Sydney Omameh (born February 21, 1993) is an American former football player. He played college football at Ohio Dominion and Grand Valley State. Professionally, he was a member of the Ottawa Redblacks of the Canadian Football League (CFL) and the Columbus Destroyers of the Arena Football League (AFL).

== Early life ==
Sydney Omameh was born in Columbus, Ohio. He received his early education from Westerville North High School. He completed his preparatory education at William Mason High School. He played in eight games as a senior, recording 35 tackles, 12 for loss, three quarterback sacks, including a blocking a field goal at Ashland. During his senior year, he was named to the 1st team All-Conference and received an honorable mention in Ohio Southwest.

== College career ==
=== Ohio Dominican ===
Omameh was a member of the Ohio Dominion of Old Dominion University from 2011 to 2015. He graduated with a degree in international business.

In 2013, Omameh was included in the Second Team All-GLIAC. During the same year, he was also selected for the First Team All-Ohio Division II. During 2013, he played 11 games and recorded 40 tackles, 13.5 tackles for loss, 7 sacks, and three blocked kicks.

In 2014, while playing as a defensive for Ohio Dominican, he scored the opening touchdown of a 28-24 Panthers victory by returning a 25-yard blocked kick for a touchdown. In December 2014, he named in the Daktronics All-Super Region Four team squad.

=== Grand Valley State ===
In September 2016, Omameh joined GVSU football after leaving Ohio Dominican in the summer of the season. Before joining GVSU, he spent four years in the Great Lakes Intercollegiate Athletic Conference (GLIAC). His notable contributions for Grand Valley include four sacks for them against Lakers.

== Professional career ==
In 2018, Omameh was signed by the Ottawa Redblacks of the Canadian Football League.

During the 2019 season, Omameh played for the Columbus Destroyers.

== Personal life ==
Omameh is a brother of Patrick Omameh.

At the age of eleven, Omameh started producing music under the artistic name, Uch3nna, using FL Studio. In October 2022, his single, "Fake", was released. He later released "Hate" and "Antidote". His father was a music producer.
