= Hayworth Hicks =

American football player (born 1988)

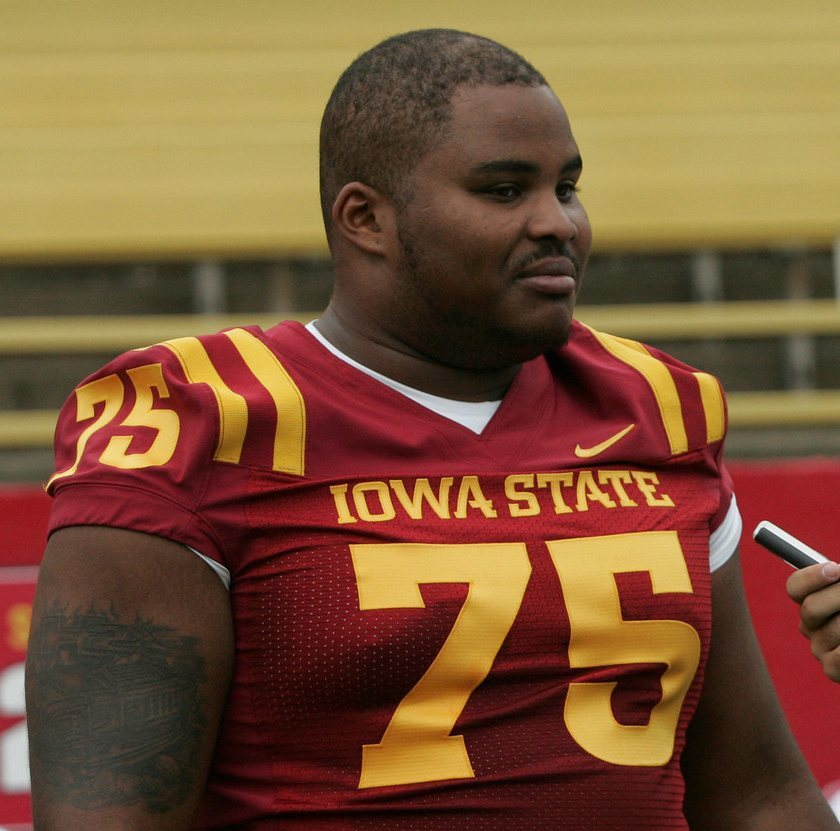
- Hicks at Iowa State in 2011

No. 75
- Position: Offensive guard

Personal information
- Born: October 3, 1988 (age 38); Los Angeles, California, U.S.
- Listed height: 6 ft 3 in (1.91 m)
- Listed weight: 336 lb (152 kg)

Career information
- High school: Palmdale (CA)
- College: Iowa State
- NFL draft: 2012: undrafted

Career history
- Indianapolis Colts (2012)*; New York Jets (2012); Kansas City Chiefs (2012); Tampa Bay Buccaneers (2012); Carolina Panthers (2012); Orlando Predators (2014–2015); Arizona Rattlers (2016); Albany Empire (2018–2019)
- * Offseason or practice squad member only

Awards and highlights
- ArenaBowl champion (2019); First-team All-Arena (2018); AFL Offensive Lineman of the Year (2018)

Career AFL statistics
- Tackles: 2.5
- Stats at ArenaFan.com
- Stats at Pro Football Reference

Hayworth Hicks (born October 3, 1988) is an American former professional football player who was an offensive guard in the Arena Football League (AFL) and the National Football League (NFL). He was signed by the Indianapolis Colts as an undrafted free agent in 2012. He played college football at Iowa State. He was also a member of the New York Jets, Kansas City Chiefs, Tampa Bay Buccaneers, Carolina Panthers, Orlando Predators, Arizona Rattlers and Albany Empire.

== Early life ==
Hicks attended Palmdale High School in Palmdale, California. He earned all-CIF Western Division honors and all-conference in his Junior and Senior season.

== College career ==
Hicks played college football at Iowa State University. He was selected 2011 Second-team All-Big 12 team. In 2011, he was presented with the Iowa State’s Arthur Floyd Scott Award as Iowa State's most outstanding lineman.

== Professional career ==
=== Indianapolis Colts ===
On April 30, 2012, Hicks signed with the Indianapolis Colts as an undrafted free agent. On August 31, he was released on the day of roster cuts. On September 1, 2012, he was signed to the practice squad.

=== New York Jets ===
On November 7, 2012, Hicks was signed to the New York Jets active roster from the Colts practice squad. Hicks was waived on November 28, 2012.

=== Kansas City Chiefs ===
On November 28, 2012, Hicks was claimed off waivers by the Kansas City Chiefs. He was waived on December 8, 2012.

=== Tampa Bay Buccaneers ===
Hicks signed with the Tampa Bay Buccaneers on December 10, 2012 but was waived three days later. He was then signed to the Buccaneers' practice squad on December 15, 2012.

=== Carolina Panthers ===
On December 18, 2012, Hicks was signed off of the Buccaneers' practice squad by the Carolina Panthers. He was waived by the Panthers on August 31, 2013.

=== Orlando Predators ===
On February 18, 2014, Hicks was assigned to the Orlando Predators of the Arena Football League. He played for the Predators from 2014 to 2015.

=== Arizona Rattlers ===
On December 4, 2015, Hicks was assigned to the Arizona Rattlers.

=== Albany Empire ===
On March 20, 2018, Hicks was assigned to the Albany Empire. On July 18, 2018, Hicks was named the AFL's Offensive Lineman of the Year. On April 4, 2019, Hicks was assigned to the Empire again.
