= Brandon Stephens (American football, born 1987) =

American football player (born 1987)

No. 9, 1, 4, 5
- Position: Cornerback

Personal information
- Born: December 14, 1987 (age 38); Strongsville, Ohio, U.S.
- Listed height: 5 ft 10 in (1.78 m)
- Listed weight: 205 lb (93 kg)

Career information
- High school: Strongsville (Ohio)
- College: Miami (OH)
- NFL draft: 2011: undrafted

Career history
- Detroit Lions (2011)*; Cleveland Gladiators (2014–2016); Cleveland Browns (2015)*; Baltimore Brigade (2017); Cleveland Gladiators (2017); Albany Empire (2018); Columbus Destroyers (2019)
- * Offseason or practice squad member only
- Stats at Pro Football Reference
- Stats at ArenaFan.com

Brandon Stephens (born December 14, 1987) is an American former professional football cornerback who played in the Arena Football League (AFL) with the Cleveland Gladiators, Baltimore Brigade, Albany Empire, and Columbus Destroyers. He played college football at Miami University.

== Professional career ==
Pre-draft measurables
Height	Weight	40-yard dash	10-yard split	20-yard split	20-yard shuttle	Three-cone drill	Vertical jump	Broad jump	Bench press
5 ft 10 1/8 in (1.78 m)	200 lb (91 kg)	4.62 s	1.60 s	2.66 s	4.21 s	6.81 s	36.5 in (0.93 m)	10 ft 5 in (3.18 m)	17 reps
All values from Pro Day

Stephens signed with the Detroit Lions on July 29, 2011. He suffered an injury during training camp and was released on August 11. He was signed to the Lions' practice squad on November 29 and was released on December 27, 2011.

Stephens signed with the Cleveland Browns on May 11, 2015. He was released on August 4, 2015, with an injury settlement.
