= Nick Seither =

American football player (born 1993)

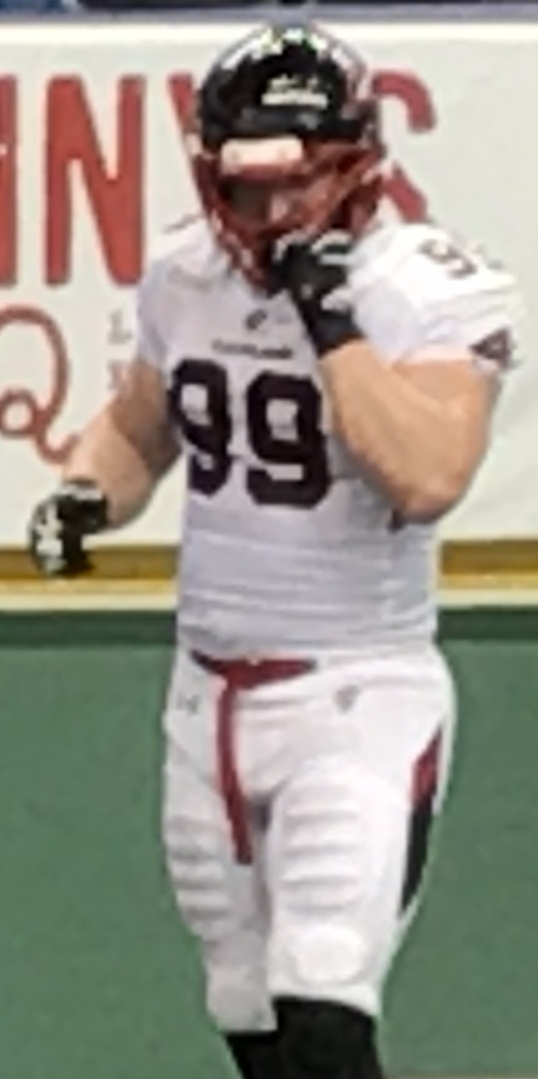
- Seither with the Cleveland Gladiators in 2017

No. 99
- Position: Defensive lineman

Personal information
- Born: March 2, 1993 (age 33); Hamilton, Ohio, U.S.
- Listed height: 6 ft 3 in (1.91 m)
- Listed weight: 290 lb (132 kg)

Career information
- High school: Badin (Hamilton)
- College: Georgetown (KY)
- NFL draft: 2015: undrafted

Career history
- Cleveland Gladiators (2016–2017); Albany Empire (2018); Birmingham Iron (2019)*; Columbus Destroyers (2019)
- * Offseason or practice squad member only

Awards and highlights
- Second-team All-Arena (2017); AFCA First Team All-American (2014)

Career AFL statistics
- Tackles: 41
- Sacks: 8.5
- Pass breakups: 1
- Stats at ArenaFan.com

Nick Seither (born March 2, 1993) is an American former professional football defensive lineman who played in the Arena Football League (AFL) for the Cleveland Gladiators, Albany Empire, and Columbus Destroyers. He played college football at Georgetown College in Georgetown, Kentucky.

== Early life ==
Seither attended Father Stephen T. Badin High School. As a junior, Seither was named Second Team All-Division V in Ohio. Seither was again named Second Team All-Division V as a senior.

== College career ==
Seither played for the Georgetown Tigers from 2011 to 2014. He was the team's starter his final three years and helped the Tigers to 37 wins. He played in 35 games during his career including 32 starts at defensive end. As a senior in 2014, Seither was named a First Team All-American by the American Football Coaches Association.

=== Statistics ===
Year	Team	Tackles						Interceptions				
Year	Team	Solo	Ast	Total	Loss	Sacks	FF	Int	Yards	Avg	TD	PD
2011	Georgetown (KY)	3	1	4	1.0	1.0	0	0	0	--	0	0
2012	Georgetown (KY)	12	16	28	6.5	3.5	2	0	0	--	0	0
2013	Georgetown (KY)	20	26	46	7.5	4.0	0	0	0	--	0	2
2013	Georgetown (KY)	26	21	47	17.5	9.0	3	0	0	0.0	0	0
NAIA career totals		61	64	125	32.5	17.5	5	0	0	0.0	0	2

== Professional career ==
Pre-draft measurables
Height	Weight	40-yard dash	Vertical jump	Broad jump	Bench press
6 ft 3 in (1.91 m)	273 lb (124 kg)	4.63 s	39.0 in (0.99 m)	10 ft 01 in (3.07 m)	31 reps
All values from Eastern Kentucky Pro Day

Seither invited to the Arizona Cardinals mini-camp in April, 2015 as an undrafted free agent, but he failed to make the team.

On June 7, 2016, Seither was assigned to the Cleveland Gladiators. On January 5, 2017, Seither had his rookie option exercised by the Gladiators. He earned Second Team All-Arena honors in 2017.

Seither was selected by the Beijing Lions in the third round of the 2017 CAFL draft.

On March 20, 2018, Seither was assigned to the Albany Empire.

In November 2018, Seither signed with the Birmingham Iron of the AAF.

On March 6, 2019, Seither was assigned to the Columbus Destroyers.
