= Rob Keefe =

American football player and coach (born 1980)

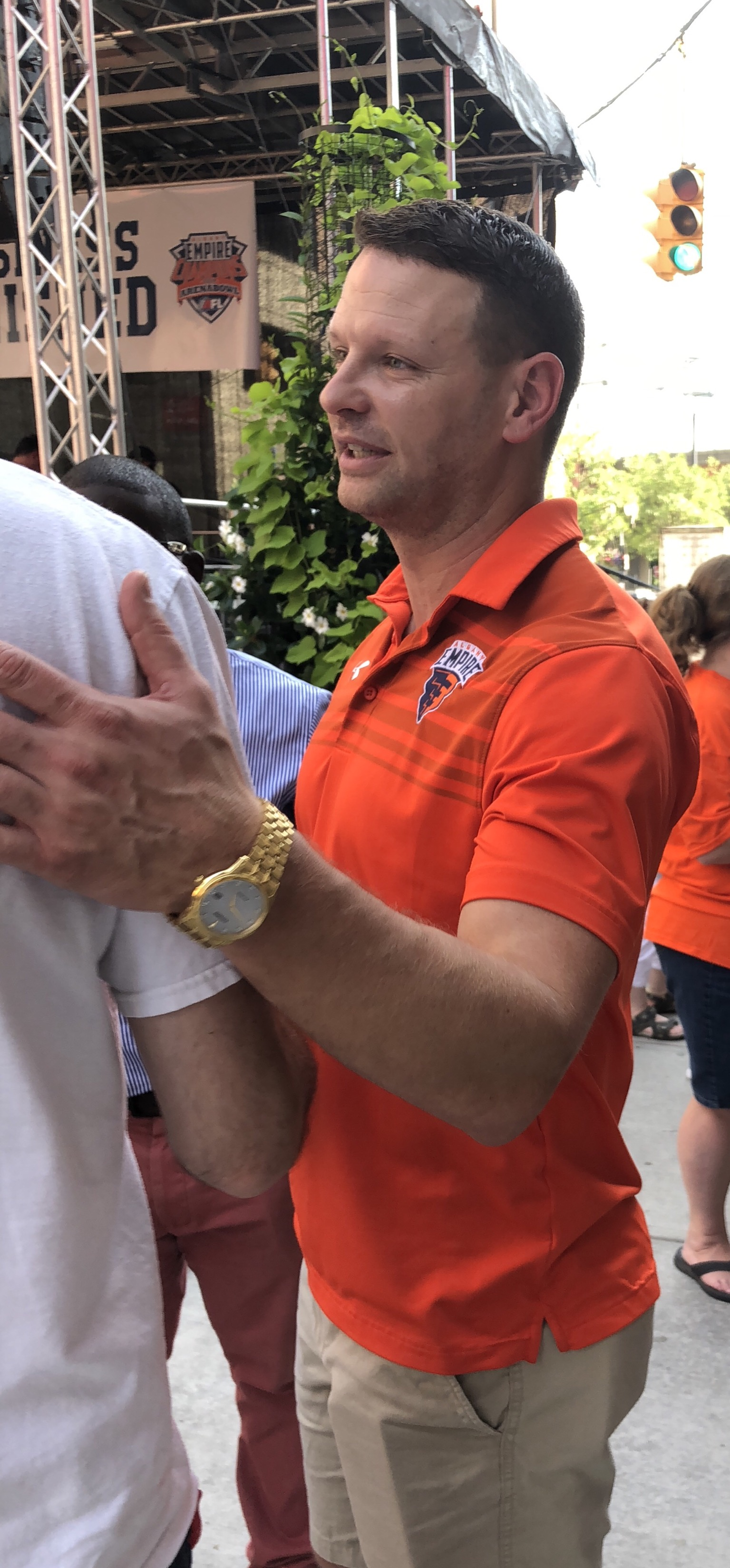
- Keefe at the Empire’s ArenaBowl XXXII victory celebration in 2019

Athens Crush
- Title: Head coach

Personal information
- Born: November 5, 1980 (age 46); Springfield, Virginia, U.S.
- Listed height: 6 ft 0 in (1.83 m)
- Listed weight: 190 lb (86 kg)

Career information
- Position: Defensive back
- College: Mercyhurst College
- NFL draft: 2004: undrafted

Career history

Playing
- Spokane Shock (2006–2007); Philadelphia Soul (2008)

Coaching
- Spokane Shock (2009) (Defensive backs coach); Spokane Shock (2010–2011) (Head coach); Orlando Predators (2012) (Offensive coordinator); Utah Blaze (2012–2013) (Defensive coordinator); Orlando Predators (2014–2016) (Head coach); Albany Empire (2018–2019) (Head coach); Iowa Barnstormers (2021) (Assistant head coach/defensive coordinator); Northern Arizona Wranglers (2022) (Assistant head coach/defensive coordinator); Bay Area Panthers (2023) (Assistant head coach/defensive coordinator); Bay Area Panthers (2024–2025) (Head coach/president of football operations); Orlando Pirates (2026) (Head coach/defensive coordinator); Athens Crush (2027–present) (Head coach)

Awards and highlights
- 3× ArenaBowl champion (2008, 2010, 2019); 2× ArenaCup champion (2006, 2009)

Career AFL statistics
- Tackles: 36
- Pass breakups: 3
- Kickoff returns: 18
- Kickoff return yards: 339
- Stats at ArenaFan.com

Head coaching record
- Regular season: 75–35 (.682)
- Postseason: 8–5 (.615)
- Career: 83–40 (.675)

Rob Keefe (born November 5, 1980) is an American football coach and former defensive back. Keefe has five championship victories and is the only person in arena football history to win ArenaCup (af2) and ArenaBowl (AFL) titles as both a player and a coach.

== Playing career ==
=== Mercyhurst ===
Keefe attended Mercyhurst College (Erie, PA) from 1999 to 2003. He delivered nine interceptions in his career and ranks 27th in school history with 166 career tackles. Also a standout on special teams, Keefe holds the school's career record with 643 yards on punt returns.

=== Spokane Shock ===
Keefe joined the Spokane Shock (then af2) for the club's inaugural season in 2006, helping the franchise secure its first ArenaCup Championship. He ended his two-year tenure with the Shock as the team's career leader in tackles (168) and interceptions (19), twice earning all-af2 accolades as a defensive back.

=== Philadelphia Soul ===
Keefe entered the AFL in 2008 as a member of the Philadelphia Soul. In his only AFL season as a player, Keefe helped the Soul earn a victory over the San Jose SaberCats in ArenaBowl XXII.

== Coaching career ==
=== Spokane Shock ===
In 2009, Keefe joined the Spokane Shock as the defensive backs coach. That season, the Shock boasted the af2's top-ranked scoring defense, allowing just 37.6 points per game. Keefe's secondary surrendered the fifth-lowest number of passing yards per game (231.6) and registered the second-highest interception total in the league (34). The season culminated in an ArenaCup Championship title.

Keefe was promoted to head coach of the Shock when the organization joined the Arena Football League in 2010. Under Keefe's guidance, Spokane finished with the best record in the AFL (13–3 regular season) while producing the League's fourth-ranked scoring defense (52.7 ppg). Keefe became the youngest coach in AFL history to win a championship, as the Shock defeated the Tampa Bay Storm in ArenaBowl XXIII.

=== Orlando Predators ===
Keefe began the 2012 season as the offensive coordinator of the Orlando Predators. On April 10, 2012, it was announced that Keefe had been fired and replaced as offensive coordinator by Ben Bennett.

=== Utah Blaze ===
Keefe took over as the new defensive coordinator of the Utah Blaze midway through the 2012 season and engineered a dramatic turnaround on that side of the ball. After allowing an average of 64 points over the first 10 games of the season, Utah allowed just over 51 points per contest under Keefe. In the opening round of the 2012 postseason, the change in culture was loudly put on display as the Blaze defense surrendered a mere 34 points in a victory over the top-seeded San Antonio Talons.

=== Orlando Predators ===
On December 24, 2013, Keefe was named the new head coach of the Orlando Predators. In his first season as head coach of the Orlando Predators, Keefe directed the franchise to its first division title since 2006, coming within one win of a berth in the Arena Bowl. The 2014 Orlando Predators secured the South Division Championship and reached the American Conference Championship after knocking off the 15-3 Pittsburgh Power in the opening round of the postseason.

=== Albany Empire ===
On November 7, 2017, Keefe was named the head coach of the AFL 2018 expansion team in Albany later named the Albany Empire. He led the team to a victory in ArenaBowl XXXII in their second season. The Arena Football League, and all its teams, folded after the season.

In 2020, a new Albany Empire was launched in the National Arena League to begin play in the 2021 season, with Keefe announced as the inaugural coach. He resigned on April 12, 2021, before ever coaching a game for the new team due to disagreements with the new owners. The next day, he was hired by the Iowa Barnstormers of the Indoor Football League (IFL) to be the assistant head coach and defensive coordinator under Les Moss, who had been Keefe's assistant in Albany.

=== Orlando Pirates ===
On November 18, 2025, Keefe was hired as the head coach and defensive coordinator for the re-branded, Orlando Pirates of the IFL. He stepped down on April 11, 2026.

=== Athens Crush ===
On June 26, 2026, Keefe was announced as the first head coach and director of football operations for the Athens Crush, a new IFL franchise.

=== AFL head coaching record ===
Team	Year	Regular season				Postseason			
Team	Year	Won	Lost	Win %	Finish	Won	Lost	Win %	Result
SPO	2010	13	3	.813	1st in NC West	3	0	1.000	Defeated Tampa Bay Storm in ArenaBowl XXIII
SPO	2011	9	9	.500	2nd in NC West	0	1	.000	Lost to Arizona Rattlers in Conference Semifinals
SPO total		22	12	.647	–	3	1	.750	
ORL	2014	11	7	.611	1st in AC South	1	1	.500	Lost to Cleveland Gladiators in American Conference Final
ORL	2015	12	6	.667	1st in AC South	0	1	.000	Lost to Jacksonville Sharks in Conference Semifinals
ORL	2016	12	4	.750	2nd in AC	0	1	.000	Lost to Jacksonville Sharks in Conference Semifinals
ORL total		35	17	.673	–	1	3	.250	
ALB	2018	8	4	.667	1st in AFL	1	1	.500	Lost to Washington Valor in Semifinals
ALB	2019	10	2	.833	1st in AFL	3	0	1.000	Defeated Philadelphia Soul in ArenaBowl XXXII
ALB total		18	6	.750	–	4	1	.800	
Total		75	35	.682		8	5	.615	
