= Paul Browning =

Paul Browning may refer to:

- Doctor Browning, a fictional character from the British soap opera Hollyoaks
- Paul Browning (American football) (born 1992), American football wide receiver
