= Tevin Homer =

American football player (born 1995)

Profile
- Position: Defensive back

Personal information
- Born: March 13, 1995 (age 31); Boynton Beach, Florida, U.S.
- Listed height: 6 ft 2 in (1.88 m)
- Listed weight: 195 lb (88 kg)

Career information
- High school: Park Vista Community
- College: Arkansas Baptist (2013–2014); Florida Atlantic (2015–2016)
- NFL draft: 2017: undrafted

Career history
- Washington Redskins (2017)*; Winnipeg Blue Bombers (2018); Albany Empire (2019); Jersey Flight (2021); Northern Arizona Wranglers (2022); Bay Area Panthers (2023)
- * Offseason or practice squad member only

Awards and highlights
- ArenaBowl champion (2019); IFL national champion (2022)

Tevin Homer (born March 13, 1995) is an American professional football defensive back. He played college football for the Florida Atlantic Owls.

== College career ==
Homer played college football at Florida Atlantic. Homer only played in 11 games for the Owls, recording only 3 tackles and being used primarily on special teams.

== Professional career ==
=== Washington Redskins ===
Homer signed with the Washington Redskins after going undrafted in the 2017 NFL draft. He was signed after a tryout. Homer was released before the start of the regular season.

=== Winnipeg Blue Bombers ===
Homer signed with the Winnipeg Blue Bombers of the Canadian Football League in February 2018.

=== Albany Empire ===
Homer joined the Albany Empire of the Arena Football League following a tryout camp in Orlando, Florida.

=== Jersey Flight ===
Homer signed with the Jersey Flight of the National Arena League on February 18, 2021.

=== Northern Arizona Wranglers ===
On April 3, 2022, Homer signed with the Northern Arizona Wranglers of the Indoor Football League (IFL). On December 7, 2022, Homer was released by the Wranglers.

=== Bay Area Panthers ===
On December 12, 2022, Homer signed with the Bay Area Panthers of the Indoor Football League (IFL).
