= Terence Moore (American football) =

American football player (born 1987)

No. 8, 5
- Positions: Fullback, Linebacker, Cornerback

Personal information
- Born: March 5, 1987 (age 39); Columbus, Georgia, U.S.
- Listed height: 6 ft 2 in (1.88 m)
- Listed weight: 225 lb (102 kg)

Career information
- College: Troy State

Career history
- Spokane Shock (2012–2014); Orlando Predators (2015–2016); Cleveland Gladiators (2017); Albany Empire (2018–2019)

Awards and highlights
- ArenaBowl champion (2019); AFL Defensive Player of the Year (2018); First-team All-Arena (2018); 2× Second-team All-Arena (2015, 2016); First-team All-Sun Belt (2008)

Career AFL statistics
- Touchdowns: 16
- Tackles: 365

Terence Francisco Moore (born March 5, 1987) is an American former professional football linebacker who played eight seasons in the Arena Football League (AFL) for the Spokane Shock, Orlando Predators, Cleveland Gladiators, and Albany Empire.

== Early life and education ==
Terence Moore was born on March 5, 1987, in Columbus, Georgia. He went to college at Troy State. He had 157 tackles in his college career.

== Professional career ==
=== Spokane Shock ===
His first season was in 2012 with the Spokane Shock of the Arena Football League. He had 32 tackles and 3 interceptions. Two of his interceptions were returned for touchdowns. He also had two rushing touchdowns as a fullback. He played with the Shock until 2015, when he went to the Orlando Predators. In each of his seasons with the Shock, he had two interceptions returned for touchdowns.

=== Orlando Predators ===
From 2015 to 2016 he played with the Orlando Predators. In both seasons he was named second-team All-Arena.

=== Cleveland Gladiators ===
The next season he played with the Cleveland Gladiators. He had 40 tackles and 4 interceptions.

=== Albany Empire ===
His last two seasons were with the Albany Empire. In 2018, he won the Defensive Player of the Year Award. He also was named first-team All-Arena. In 2019, he won the final ArenaBowl, ArenaBowl XXXII.
