= Quentin Sims =

American football player (born 1990)

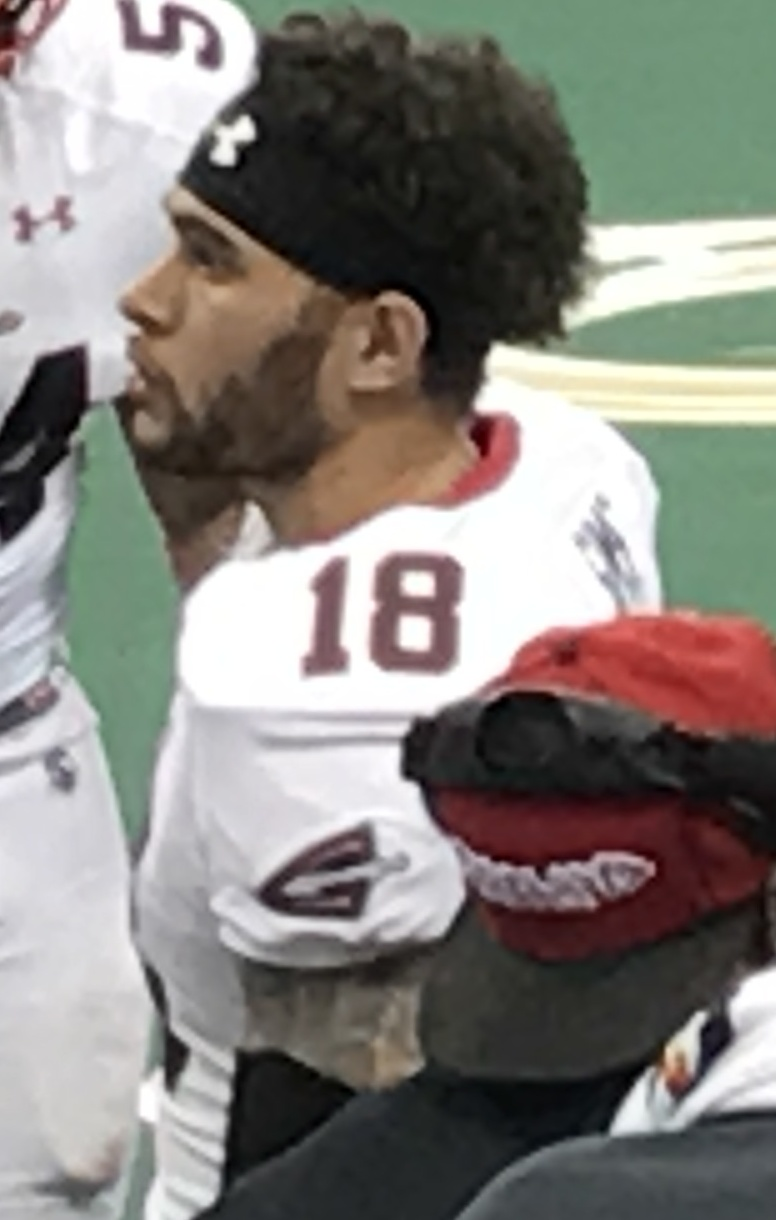
- Sims with the Cleveland Gladiators in 2017

No. 5, 18
- Position: Wide receiver

Personal information
- Born: July 11, 1990 (age 36); Tucson, Arizona, U.S.
- Listed height: 6 ft 3 in (1.91 m)
- Listed weight: 205 lb (93 kg)

Career information
- High school: Colerain (Cincinnati, Ohio)
- College: UT Martin
- NFL draft: 2013: undrafted

Career history
- New England Patriots (2013)*; Orlando Predators (2014); Winnipeg Blue Bombers (2014)*; Arizona Rattlers (2015); Cleveland Gladiators (2016–2017); Ottawa Redblacks (2017)*; Baltimore Brigade (2018); Albany Empire (2019)
- * Offseason or practice squad member only

Awards and highlights
- ArenaBowl champion (2019); Second-team All-Arena (2017); First-team All-Ohio Valley Conference (2012)

Career AFL statistics
- Receptions: 174
- Receiving yards: 2,193
- Receiving TDs: 53
- Stats at ArenaFan.com

Quentin Sims (born July 11, 1990) is an American former professional football wide receiver. He played college football at University of Tennessee at Martin and attended Northwest High School and Colerain High School in Cincinnati, Ohio where he played football and participated in track and field. He was a member of the New England Patriots, Orlando Predators, Winnipeg Blue Bombers, Arizona Rattlers, Cleveland Gladiators, Ottawa Redblacks, Baltimore Brigade, and Albany Empire.

== College career ==
Sims played for the Georgia Tech Yellow Jackets from 2008 to 2010. He was the team's back up wide receiver for 2 years and helped the Yellow Jackets to 16 wins. He transferred to UT Martin where he played from 2011 to 2012. He was the team's starter for two years and helped the Skyhawks to 13 wins. He played in 45 games during his career including 22 starts at wide receiver. As a senior in 2012, Sims was named First-team All-Ohio Valley Conference.

=== Statistics ===
Sims's college statistics are as follows:

Year	Team	Receiving				Rushing				Kick return				Punt return			
Year	Team	Rec	Yards	Avg	TDs	Att	Yards	Avg	TDs	Ret	Yards	Avg	TDs	Ret	Yards	Avg	TDs
2008	Georgia Tech	Redshirt															
2009	Georgia Tech	0	0	--	0	0	0	--	0	0	0	--	0	0	0	--	0
2010	Georgia Tech	0	0	--	0	2	19	9.5	0	0	0	--	0	0	0	--	0
2011	UT Martin	54	712	13.2	10	0	0	--	0	1	-2	-2.0	0	5	37	7.4	0
2012	UT Martin	86	1,092	12.7	16	0	0	--	0	0	0	--	0	0	0	--	0
Career		140	1,804	12.9	26	2	19	9.5	0	1	-2	-2.0	0	5	37	7.4	0

== Professional career ==
Pre-draft measurables
Height	Weight	Vertical jump	Broad jump	Bench press
6 ft 3 in (1.91 m)	208 lb (94 kg)	35 in (0.89 m)	10 ft 0 in (3.05 m)	20 reps
All values from Lane College Pro Day

Sims signed as an undrafted free agent with the New England Patriots on July 19, 2013. He played in all four of the Patriots preseason games before he was cut on August 31, 2013. On September 2, 2013, Sims was signed to the Patriots practice squad. He was cut on September 10, 2013.

Sims was assigned to the Orlando Predators of the Arena Football League (AFL) in 2013. Sims was activated from other league exempt status on May 12, 2014. However, he was placed on the refused to report list on May 13. He was placed on reassignment on June 6, 2014.

Sims signed with the Winnipeg Blue Bombers of the Canadian Football League (CFL) on February 5, 2014. He was cut on May 1, 2014.

Sims was assigned to the AFL's Arizona Rattlers on June 24, 2015. Sims was activated On June 6, 2015, and appeared in the Rattlers final game of the season scoring two touchdowns. He played in the Rattlers National Conference Semifinals but did not play in the National Conference Championship loss to the San Jose SaberCats. On October 12, 2015, the Rattlers picked up Sims' rookie option, but on November 5, 2015, Sims was placed on recallable reassignment.

On February 5, 2016, Sims was assigned to the Cleveland Gladiators of the AFL. Sims recorded career highs in all statistical categories in 2016 with 92 receptions, 1,112 receiving yards and 27 touchdowns. Sims emerged as the Gladiators number one receiver in 2017 and earned Second-team All-Arena honors.

Sims was signed to the practice roster of the CFL's Ottawa Redblacks on September 6, 2017. He was released by the Redblacks on September 12, 2017.

On March 22, 2018, Sims was assigned to the Baltimore Brigade of the AFL.

On March 11, 2019, Sims was assigned to the AFL's Albany Empire.
