= Tommy Grady =

American football player (born 1985)

No. 4
- Position: Quarterback

Personal information
- Born: March 18, 1985 (age 41); Huntington Beach, California, U.S.
- Listed height: 6 ft 7 in (2.01 m)
- Listed weight: 245 lb (111 kg)

Career information
- High school: Edison (Huntington Beach)
- College: Oklahoma (2004); Utah (2006–2007)
- NFL draft: 2008: undrafted

Career history
- Oklahoma City Yard Dawgz (2009–2010); Utah Blaze (2011–2013); Pittsburgh Power (2014); Jacksonville Sharks (2015–2017); Washington Valor (2017)*; Albany Empire (2018–2019); Albany Empire (2021)
- * Offseason or practice squad member only

Awards and highlights
- ArenaBowl champion (2019); 2× NAL champion (2017, 2021); ArenaBowl MVP (2019); 3× First-team All-Arena (2012, 2018, 2019); 3× AFL MVP (2012, 2018, 2019); 2× AFL Offensive Player of the Year (2012, 2018); Second-team All-NAL (2021); 4× AFL passing yards leader (2012, 2016, 2018, 2019); 3× AFL passing touchdown leader (2012, 2018, 2019); AFL records: Passing touchdowns in a season: 142 (2012); Passing yards in a season: 5,870 (2012); Completions in a season: 507 (2012); Passing attempts in a season: 743 (2012); Passing touchdowns in a game: 12

Career AFL statistics
- Comp. / Att.: 3,246 / 5,025
- Passing yards: 38,062
- TD–INT: 850–129
- Passer rating: 116.36
- Rushing touchdowns: 15
- Stats at ArenaFan.com

Thomas Grady (born March 18, 1985) is an American former professional football quarterback who primarily played in the Arena Football League (AFL).

After a standout high school career at Edison High School, Grady signed with the University of Oklahoma to continue his football career. After a lack of playing time for two years, Grady transferred to the University of Utah. While at Utah, Grady saw limited action again, making only three starts in his career.

After going undrafted in 2008, Grady played for the Oklahoma City Yard Dawgz of the af2 in 2009. He then played in the AFL from 2010 to 2016 and from 2018 to 2019 for the Yard Dawgz, Pittsburgh Power, Jacksonville Sharks, and Albany Empire. He played in the National Arena League (NAL) for the Sharks in 2017.

In 2013, Grady set single-season AFL records for touchdown passes (142) and passing yards (5,863), while also tying a single-game record with 12 touchdown passes. He won ArenaBowl XXXII with the Empire in 2019, and was also a three-time AFL MVP. He later led the Empire to the NAL title in 2021.

== Early life ==
College recruiting
Name	Hometown	School	Height	Weight	40^{‡}	Commit date
Tommy Grady; QB	Huntington Beach, California	Edison High School	6 ft 6 in (1.98 m)	215 lb (98 kg)	4.9	Jul 8, 2003
Tommy Grady; QB	Recruit ratings: Scout: Rivals:					
Overall recruit ranking: Scout: 5 (QB) Rivals: 3 (QB), 9 (CA) 70 National
Note: In many cases, Scout, Rivals, 247Sports, On3, and ESPN may conflict in their listings of height and weight.; In these cases, the average was taken. ESPN grades are on a 100-point scale.; Sources: "Oklahoma Football Commitments". Rivals.; "2003 Oklahoma Football Commits". Scout.; "Scout.com Team Recruiting Rankings". Scout.; "2003 Team Ranking". Rivals.com.

On July 8, 2003, Grady committed to Oklahoma. Grady chose Oklahoma over offers from Florida State, Tennessee, UCLA, USC and Washington.

== College career ==
=== Oklahoma ===
Grady began his college career at the University of Oklahoma, He redshirted in 2003, and watched from the sidelines as starter Jason White won the Heisman Trophy. As White's backup in 2004, Grady completed 12 of 14 passes for 63 yards and one touchdown.

=== Utah ===
Grady transferred to the University of Utah in 2005. He saw limited action as a junior in 2006, completing 7 of 14 passes for 102 yards, one touchdown, and one interception. He entered his senior season as a backup, but took over as quarterback when starter Brian Johnson suffered an injury early in the year. Grady played in nine games, including six starts (4-2 record). He finished the season with 58 completions in 115 attempts, for a total of 681 yards, with four touchdowns and three interceptions. The highlight of the year for Grady was leading the Utes to a 44–6 rout over #11 ranked UCLA.

== Professional career ==
Grady was rated the 35th best quarterback in the 2008 NFL draft by NFLDraftScout.com.

Pre-draft measurables
Height	Weight	Vertical jump	Broad jump
6 ft 7 1/4 in (2.01 m)	240 lb (109 kg)	27 in (0.69 m)	8 ft 5 in (2.57 m)
All values from Utah Pro Day

=== Oklahoma City Yard Dawgz ===
In 2009, Grady played for the Oklahoma City Yard Dawgz of af2. In 2010, Grady was re-signed by the Yard Dawgz. He was the starter for the Yard Dawgz in its only season in the Arena Football League (AFL). He led the team to a 6–10 record.

Grady had a tryout with the Miami Dolphins in early August 2010 but was not signed.

=== Utah Blaze ===
In 2011, Grady signed with the Utah Blaze of the AFL. In the 2011 season, he led the Blaze to a 9–9 record, and threw for over 100 touchdowns.

He re-signed with the Blaze for the 2012 season. Grady led the Blaze to a 12–6 record, with a playoff berth. During the season, Grady set a single-season record for touchdown passes with 142, breaking the previous mark of 117 set by Chris Greisen. Grady's play during the season landed him the Arena Football League Offensive Player of the Year Award. Grady also broke Greisen's record of passing yards in a single season, with 5,870. During a July 13 game against the Cleveland Gladiators, Grady threw 12 touchdown passes, tying an AFL single-game record.

Grady re-signed with the Blaze on November 1, 2012 to a three-year maximum.

=== Pittsburgh Power ===
Grady was assigned to the AFL's Pittsburgh Power on September 6, 2013 after he was selected in the dispersal draft of the Chicago Rush and Blaze players. The Power folded after the 2014 season.

=== Jacksonville Sharks ===
On January 20, 2015, Grady was assigned to the Jacksonville Sharks of the AFL.

On October 14, 2016, Grady was assigned to the Washington Valor during the dispersal draft after Jacksonville chose to leave the AFL. However, on November 29, 2016, Grady elected to remain with the Sharks in the newly created National Arena League (NAL) for the 2017 season. He suffered a season-ending foot injury on April 24, 2017, against the Monterrey Steel. Grady played in five games for the Sharks in 2017, completing 71 of 113 passes for 1,060 yards, 23 touchdowns, and 1 interception. On August 14, 2017, Grady signed with the Sharks for the 2018 season, but left the team during the preseason.

=== Albany Empire ===
On April 2, 2018, Grady returned to the AFL with the expansion Albany Empire. He led the team to the best regular season record while earning AFL MVP and All-Arena honors, but lost in the semifinals to the two-win Washington Valor. He stayed with the Empire for the 2019 season and defeated the Philadelphia Soul in ArenaBowl XXXII, giving Grady his first ArenaBowl championship. He was named the ArenaBowl XXXII MVP after completing 16 of 25 passes for 200 yards and five touchdowns. After his victory in the ArenaBowl, Grady was the subject of jokes and comparisons to the similarly named NFL quarterback, Tom Brady, who also won the Super Bowl in 2019. The AFL folded after the 2019 season.

Grady returned to Albany when a new version of the Empire joined the NAL in 2021. In the 2021 season, Grady completed 70.3% of his passes for 2,050 yards, 50 touchdowns, and eight interceptions, garnering All-NAL second-team recognition. He also led the Empire to a victory in the 2021 NAL championship game. Following the season, he claimed the new organization had not paid his championship bonus, that the experience off-field was the worst of his career, and considered himself retired. He was subsequently suspended indefinitely by the league because of his public statements about the team, which the league claimed to be false.

== Career statistics ==
Legend
	AFL MVP
	Won the ArenaBowl
	AFL record
	Led the league
**Bold**	Career high

=== AFL ===
Year	Team	Passing							Rushing		
Year	Team	Cmp	Att	Pct	Yds	TD	Int	Rtg	Att	Yds	TD
2010	Oklahoma City	363	597	60.8	4,307	81	17	104.87	23	-28	1
2011	Utah	382	580	65.9	4,365	107	11	120.01	30	44	5
2012	Utah	**507**	**743**	68.2	**5,870**	**142**	21	119.67	**38**	**62**	**7**
2013	Utah	310	541	57.3	3,570	67	**28**	86.73	17	32	1
2014	Pittsburgh	429	710	60.4	4,717	115	17	109.72	17	30	1
2015	Jacksonville	402	598	67.2	4,684	95	12	121.96	7	-17	0
2016	Jacksonville	400	587	68.1	4,495	94	7	125.39	3	10	0
2018	Albany	228	341	66.9	2,957	81	6	**126.19**	9	-12	0
2019	Albany	225	328	**68.6**	3,097	68	10	125.47	1	-1	0
Career		3,246	5,025	64.6	38,062	850	129	116.36	145	120	15

=== College ===
Season	Passing							Rushing			
Season	Comp	Att	Yards	Pct.	TD	Int	QB rating	Att	Yards	Avg	TD
**Oklahoma Sooners**
**2004**	12	14	63	85.7	1	0	147.1	1	9	9.0	0
**Utah Utes**
**2006**	7	14	102	50.0	1	3	91.9	3	0	0.0	0
**2007**	58	115	681	50.4	4	3	106.4	12	-28	-2.3	0
Career	77	143	846	53.8	6	6	109.0	16	-19	-1.2	0
