= Ryan Cave =

American football player (born 1988)

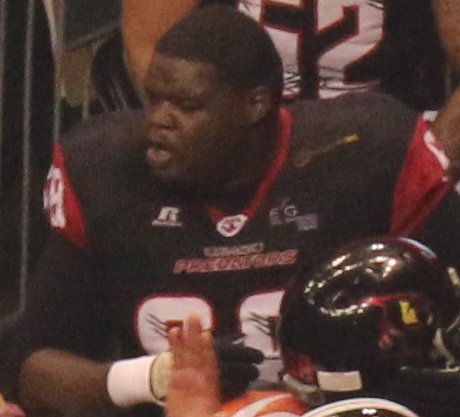
- Cave with the Orlando Predators in 2015

No. 68, 57
- Position: Offensive lineman

Personal information
- Born: May 30, 1988 (age 38); Augusta, Georgia, U.S.
- Listed height: 6 ft 4 in (1.93 m)
- Listed weight: 360 lb (163 kg)

Career information
- High school: Beaufort (Beaufort, South Carolina)
- College: Hampton (2006–2009)
- NFL draft: 2010: undrafted

Career history
- Hartford Colonials (2010); Virginia Destroyers (2011)*; Spokane Shock (2012–2014); Montreal Alouettes (2014)*; BC Lions (2014); Orlando Predators (2015); Jacksonville Sharks (2016); Tampa Bay Storm (2017); Albany Empire (2018–2019)
- * Offseason or practice squad member only

Awards and highlights
- ArenaBowl champion (2019); AFL Offensive Lineman of the Year (2019); 2× First-team All-Arena (2018–2019); Second-team All-MEAC (2008)
- Stats at ArenaFan.com

Ryan Cave (born May 30, 1988) is an American former professional football offensive lineman who played in the Arena Football League (AFL), Canadian Football League (CFL), and United Football League (UFL). He played college football at Hampton.

== Early life ==
Ryan Cave was born on May 30, 1988, in Augusta, Georgia. He was not allowed to play football until the age of 13 as he had been considered too big for youth teams. He played high school football at Beaufort High School in Beaufort, South Carolina. Cave recorded 33 pancake blocks as a junior and 30 pancake blocks as a senior, earning All-State honors both seasons. He also lettered in basketball, track, and golf in high school, and was a member of the National Honor Society.

== College career ==
Cave played college football for the Hampton Pirates of Hampton University from 2006 to 2009. He played in all 12 games, starting the final three at right guard, as a true freshman in 2006. He was the only true freshman to start for the Pirates that year on either offense or defense. Cave only played in five games in 2007, and also posted a tackle on defense. As a junior in 2008, he garnered second-team All-Mid-Eastern Athletic Conference (MEAC) recognition at center. He was named the MEAC Offensive Lineman of the Week after posting five pancake blocks while helping Hampton total 461 yards of offense in a 37–0 victory against Howard on October 10, 2009.

== Professional career ==
After going undrafted in the 2010 NFL draft, Cave signed with the Hartford Colonials of the United Football League (UFL) on August 22, 2010. He was released on September 16 before the start of the 2010 UFL season but later re-signed with the Colonials on October 21, 2010. Cave appeared in two games, starting one, for Hartford in 2010.

Cave became a free agent after the 2010 season, and signed with the UFL's Virginia Destroyers on August 23, 2011. However, he was released before playing in any games.

Cave joined the Spokane Shock of the Arena Football League (AFL) for the 2012 season. He played in 14 games in 2012, catching three passes for 22 yards and two touchdowns while also posting three solo tackles and recovering one fumble. On November 9, 2012, he was assigned to the Shock for the 2013 season. Cave played in 15 games, all starts, in 2013, recording three receptions for 34 yards and also returned a fumble for a touchdown. He was activated from the Shock's refuse to report list on April 10, 2014.

Cave was signed by the Montreal Alouettes of the Canadian Football League (CFL) on June 12, 2014. He was released on June 21 before the start of the 2014 CFL season. On July 1, Cave was signed by the CFL's BC Lions after injuries at left tackle. Former Spokane Shock general manager Ryan Rigmaiden was the Lions’ director of U.S. scouting. Cave started two games for the Lions before being released on July 17, 2014.

Cave was activated from the Shock's other league exempt list on July 18, 2014. He agreed to terms with the Orlando Predators of the AFL on January 5, 2015. He caught two passes for 18 yards and one touchdown for Orlando in 2015 while also posting one solo tackle.

Cave was assigned to the AFL's Jacksonville Sharks on April 25, 2016. He played for the Tampa Bay Storm of the AFL in 2017, and rushed 11 times for 34 yards.

Cave was assigned to the expansion Albany Empire on March 24, 2018. He was named first-team All-Arena for his performance during the 2018 season. On March 6, 2019, he was assigned to the Empire again. Cave earned AFL Offensive Lineman of the Year and first-team All-Arena honors in 2019 as Albany won ArenaBowl XXXII. The Empire offensive line only allowed two sacks throughout the entire regular season. The AFL folded after the 2019 season.

== Post-playing career ==
Cave later became a board executive for the United Football Players Association.
