= Paul Browning (American football) =

American football player (born 1992)

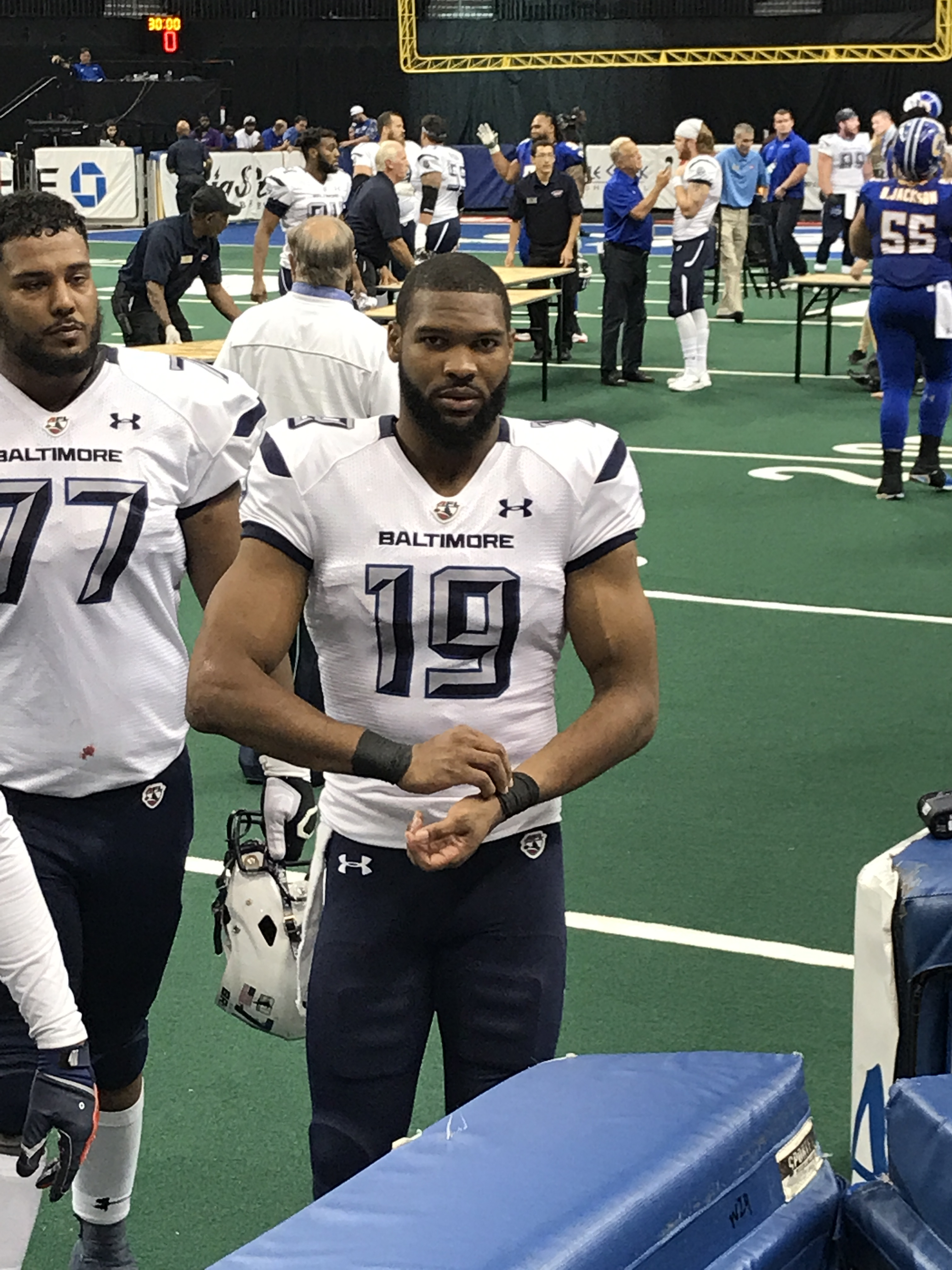
- Browning with the Baltimore Brigade in 2017

No. 19, 81
- Position: Wide receiver

Personal information
- Born: August 5, 1992 (age 34)
- Listed height: 6 ft 3 in (1.91 m)
- Listed weight: 220 lb (100 kg)

Career information
- High school: Widefield (Security-Widefield, Colorado)
- College: CSU Pueblo
- NFL draft: 2015: undrafted

Career history
- Cleveland Browns (2015)*; Carolina Panthers (2015)*; Orlando Predators (2016); Cleveland Gladiators (2017)*; Baltimore Brigade (2017); Albany Empire (2018)*; Atlantic City Blackjacks (2019); Columbus Destroyers (2019)
- * Offseason or practice squad member only
- Stats at ArenaFan.com

Paul Joseph Browning (born August 5, 1992) is an American former professional football wide receiver. He played college football at Colorado State University–Pueblo, where he earned All-American and All-Conference honors. He was signed as an undrafted free agent by the Cleveland Browns after the 2015 NFL draft. On March 19, 2018, Browning was assigned to the Albany Empire. On March 24, 2018, he was placed on refuse to report.

On March 5, 2019, Brown was assigned to the expansion Atlantic City Blackjacks.

He wears number 19, in honour of his late college teammate and best friend Ronell McNeal.
