= 2019 Philadelphia Soul season =

Arena football season

- Owner: Ron Jaworski; Craig Spencer; Pete Ciarrocchi
- General manager: Beau Bell
- Head coach: Clint Dolezel
- Home stadium: Wells Fargo Center

Results
- Record: 7–5
- League place: 3rd
- Playoffs: Semifinals, Won vs. #2 Washington ArenaBowl XXXII, Lost at Albany

The 2019 Philadelphia Soul season was the fourteenth season for the Philadelphia Soul in the Arena Football League. The Soul played at the Wells Fargo Center and were coached by Clint Dolezel for the 2019 season.

== Standings ==
2019 Arena Football League standings
Team	Overall			Points		Records			
Team	W	L	PCT	PF	PA	Home	Away	GB	STK
Albany Empire ^{xy}	10	2	.833	620	474	5–1	5–1	—	W2
Washington Valor ^{x}	7	5	.583	538	552	4–2	3–3	3	W2
Philadelphia Soul ^{x}	7	5	.583	523	530	4–2	3–3	3	L1
Baltimore Brigade ^{x}	7	5	.583	500	439	4–2	3–3	3	W1
Atlantic City Blackjacks	4	8	.333	518	550	3–3	1–5	6	L2
Columbus Destroyers	1	11	.083	394	548	1–5	0–6	9	L5

^{y} - clinched regular season title
^{x} - clinched playoff berth

== Schedule ==
=== Regular season ===
The 2019 regular season schedule was released on February 13, 2019. All times Eastern.

Week	Day	Date	Kickoff	Opponent	Results		Location	Attendance	Report
Week	Day	Date	Kickoff	Opponent	Score	Record	Location	Attendance	Report
1	Saturday	April 27, 2019	3:30 p.m.	Atlantic City Blackjacks	W 48–41	1–0	Wells Fargo Center	9,245	
2	Friday	May 3, 2019	7:00 p.m.	at Baltimore Brigade	W 36–27	2–0	Royal Farms Arena	4,381	
3	Saturday	May 11, 2019	7:00 p.m.	Albany Empire	L 48–57	2–1	Wells Fargo Center	9,843	
4	Saturday	May 18, 2019	3:30 p.m.	at Washington Valor	L 46–53	2–2	Capital One Arena	6,357	
5	Sunday	May 26, 2019	3:00 p.m.	at Baltimore Brigade	L 30–45	2–3	Royal Farms Arena	4,079	
6	Saturday	June 1, 2019	7:00 p.m.	Columbus Destroyers	W 47–35	3–3	Wells Fargo Center	8,672	
7	Sunday	June 9, 2019	4:00 p.m.	Washington Valor	L 41–48	3–4	Wells Fargo Center	7,164	
8	Sunday	June 16, 2019	4:00 p.m.	Atlantic City Blackjacks	W 54–29	4–4	Wells Fargo Center	6,910	
9	Saturday	June 22, 2019	7:00 p.m.	at Columbus Destroyers	W 42–35	5–4	Nationwide Arena	7,604	
10	Saturday	June 29, 2019	3:30 p.m.	Albany Empire	W 54–43	6–4	Wells Fargo Center	10,564	
11	Saturday	July 6, 2019	7:00 p.m.	at Atlantic City Blackjacks	W 50–45	7–4	Boardwalk Hall	7,104	
12	Bye								
13	Saturday	July 20, 2019	7:00 p.m.	at Albany Empire	L 27–72	7–5	Times Union Center	10,981	

=== Postseason ===
Round	Day	Date	Kickoff	Opponent	Score	Location	Attendance	Report
SF–1	Sunday	July 28	3:30 p.m.	at Washington Valor	W 69–33	Capital One Arena	6,942	
SF–2	Sunday	August 4	4:00 p.m.	Washington Valor	W 48–41	Wells Fargo Center	8,537	
Aggregate score					W 117–74			
ArenaBowl	Sunday	August 11	8:00 p.m.	at Albany Empire	L 27–45	Times Union Center	12,042	

== Game summaries ==
Week 1: Atlantic City (W)

	1	2	3	4	Total
Atlantic City	14	13	7	7	41
Philadelphia	7	13	14	14	48

Week 2: at Baltimore (W)

	1	2	3	4	Total
Philadelphia	6	6	18	6	36
Baltimore	6	8	7	6	27

Week 3: Albany (L)

	1	2	3	4	Total
Albany	14	14	14	15	57
Philadelphia	7	13	14	14	48

Week 4: at Washington (L)

	1	2	3	4	Total
Philadelphia	6	14	14	12	46
Washington	14	14	14	11	53

Week 5: at Baltimore (L)

	1	2	3	4	Total
Philadelphia	13	7	7	3	30
Baltimore	7	14	14	10	45

Week 6: Columbus (W)

	1	2	3	4	Total
Columbus	7	7	0	21	35
Philadelphia	13	6	14	14	47

Week 7: Washington (L)

	1	2	3	4	Total
Washington	6	14	7	21	48
Philadelphia	7	7	13	14	41

Week 8: Atlantic City (W)

	1	2	3	4	Total
Atlantic City	0	14	0	15	29
Philadelphia	13	14	14	13	54

Week 9: at Columbus (W)

	1	2	3	4	Total
Philadelphia	7	20	0	15	42
Columbus	7	14	7	7	35

Week 10: Albany (W)

	1	2	3	4	Total
Albany	14	7	0	22	43
Philadelphia	7	13	14	20	54

Week 11: at Atlantic City (W)

	1	2	3	4	Total
Philadelphia	14	6	7	23	50
Atlantic City	7	9	7	22	45

Week 13: at Albany (L)

	1	2	3	4	Total
Philadelphia	7	13	0	7	27
Albany	14	16	21	21	72

Semifinal, Leg 1: at Washington (W)

	1	2	3	4	Total
Philadelphia	6	14	21	28	69
Washington	7	0	13	13	33

Semifinal, Leg 2: Washington (W)

	1	2	3	4	Total
Washington	6	22	13	0	41
Philadelphia	14	21	6	7	48

ArenaBowl XXXII: at Albany (L)

	1	2	3	4	Total
Philadelphia	14	7	0	6	27
Albany	14	21	7	3	45
