= Monte Lewis =

American gridiron football player (born 1988)

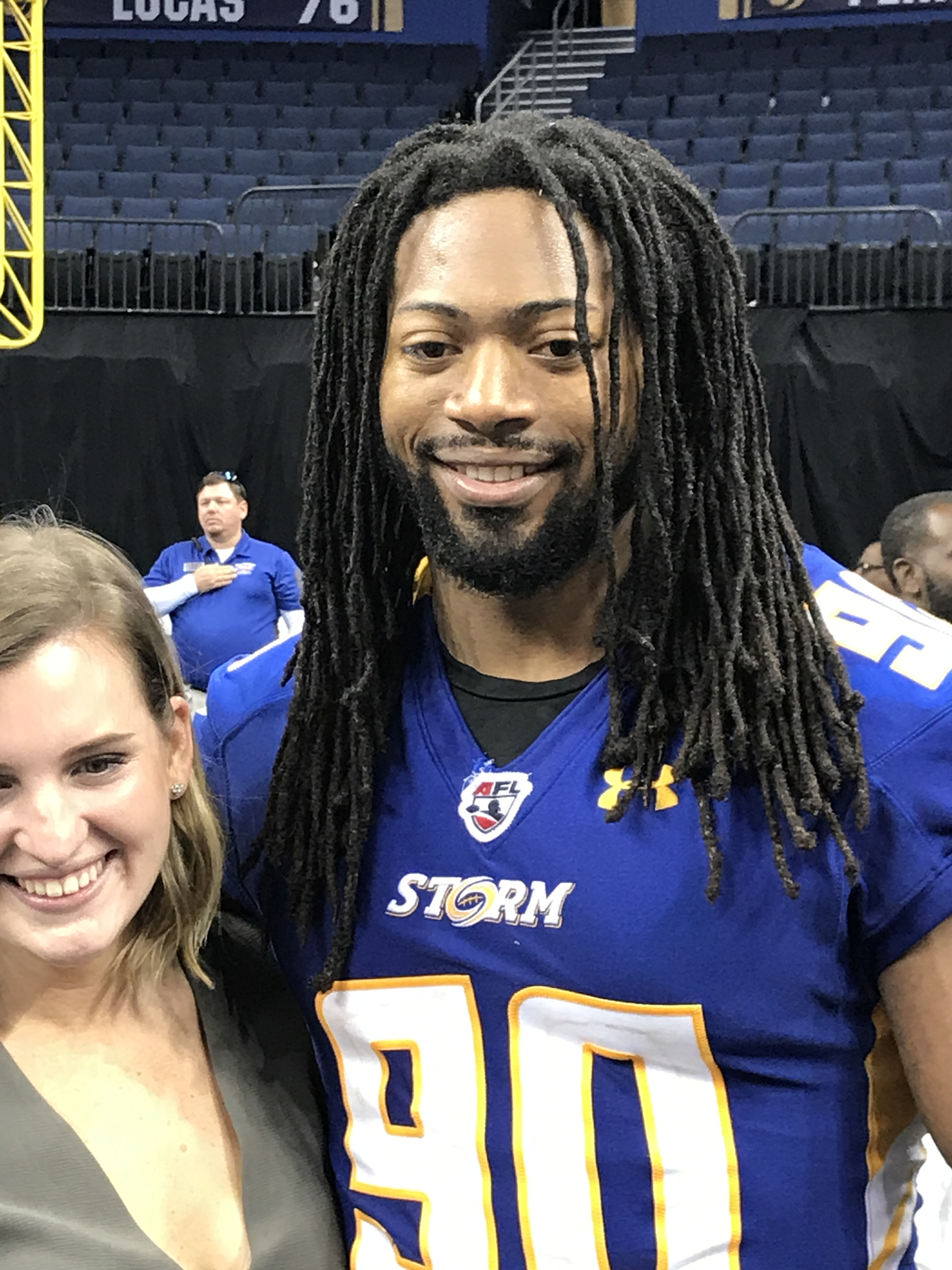
- Lewis with the Tampa Bay Storm in 2017

No. 94, 55, 90
- Position: Defensive lineman

Personal information
- Born: October 14, 1988 (age 38); Abbeville, Alabama, U.S.
- Listed height: 6 ft 4 in (1.93 m)
- Listed weight: 250 lb (113 kg)

Career information
- High school: Abbeville
- College: Jacksonville State
- NFL draft: 2012: undrafted

Career history
- Washington Redskins (2012)*; Hamilton Tiger-Cats (2012–2013); Ottawa Redblacks (2014); San Jose SaberCats (2014–2015)*; Orlando Predators (2015–2016); Tampa Bay Storm (2017); Wuhan Gators (2018)*; Baltimore Brigade (2018); Atlantic City Blackjacks (2019)
- * Offseason or practice squad member only

Awards and highlights
- First-team All-OVC (2010); Second-team All-OVC (2011)

Career CFL statistics
- Tackles: 2

Career AFL statistics
- Tackles: 12.5
- Sacks: 4
- Pass breakups: 2
- Blocked kicks: 1
- Stats at ArenaFan.com

Monte Lewis (born October 14, 1988) is an American former professional football defensive lineman. He played college football at Jacksonville State University and attended Abbeville High School in Abbeville, Alabama. He was also a member of the Washington Redskins, Hamilton Tiger-Cats, Ottawa Redblacks, San Jose SaberCats, Orlando Predators, Tampa Bay Storm, Wuhan Gators, Baltimore Brigade, and Atlantic City Blackjacks.

== Early life ==
Lewis attended Abbeville High School in Abbeville, Alabama.

== College career ==
Lewis played for the Jacksonville State Gamecocks from 2007 to 2011. He was the team's starter his final two and a half years and helped the Gamecocks to 32 wins. He played in 45 games during his career including 28 starts at defensive end. Lewis was named First-team All-Ohio Valley Conference as a junior and Second-team All-OVC as a senior.

== Professional career ==
Pre-draft measurables
Height	Weight	40-yard dash	10-yard split	20-yard split	20-yard shuttle	Three-cone drill	Vertical jump	Broad jump	Bench press
6 ft 2 in (1.88 m)	240 lb (109 kg)	4.56 s	1.58 s	2.69 s	– s	– s	34.5 in (0.88 m)	9 ft 6 in (2.90 m)	27 reps
All values from Jacksonville State Pro Day

=== Washington Redskins ===
On April 29, 2012, Lewis signed as an undrafted free agent with the Washington Redskins. On August 27, 2012, Lewis was waived by the Redskins.

=== Hamilton Tiger-Cats ===
In October 2012, Lewis was signed to the Hamilton Tiger-Cats practice roster. On April 16, 2013, Lewis re-signed with the Tiger-Cats.

=== San Jose SaberCats ===
Lewis was assigned to the San Jose SaberCats in 2013. On September 24, 2014, Lewis was activated from other league exempt by the SaberCats. On March 23, 2015, Lewis was placed on recallable reassignment.

=== Ottawa Redblacks ===
On March 4, 2014, Lewis signed with the Ottawa Redblacks in 2014. On August 7, 2014, Lewis was activated by the Redblacks. On June 21, 2014, Lewis was released by the Redblacks.

=== Orlando Predators ===
Lewis was assigned to the Orlando Predators in 2015. Lewis returned to the Predators in 2016.

=== Tampa Bay Storm ===
Lewis was assigned to the Tampa Bay Storm on October 24, 2016, during the dispersal draft. The Storm picked up Lewis' rookie option on January 5, 2017. The Storm folded in December 2017.

=== Wuhan Gators ===
Lewis was selected by the Wuhan Gators in the fifth round of the 2017 CAFL draft.

=== Baltimore Brigade ===
On March 20, 2018, Lewis was assigned to the Baltimore Brigade.

=== Atlantic City Blackjacks ===
On March 29, 2019, Lewis was assigned to the Atlantic City Blackjacks.
