= 2019 Washington Valor season =

Arena football season

- Owner: Monumental Sports & Entertainment
- Head coach: Benji McDowell
- Home stadium: Capital One Arena

Results
- Record: 7–5
- League place: 2nd
- Playoffs: Semifinals, Lost vs. #3 Philadelphia

The 2019 Washington Valor season was the third season for the Washington Valor in the Arena Football League. The Valor played at the Capital One Arena and were coached by Benji McDowell for the 2019 season.

== Standings ==
2019 Arena Football League standings
Team	Overall			Points		Records			
Team	W	L	PCT	PF	PA	Home	Away	GB	STK
Albany Empire ^{xy}	10	2	.833	620	474	5–1	5–1	—	W2
Washington Valor ^{x}	7	5	.583	538	552	4–2	3–3	3	W2
Philadelphia Soul ^{x}	7	5	.583	523	530	4–2	3–3	3	L1
Baltimore Brigade ^{x}	7	5	.583	500	439	4–2	3–3	3	W1
Atlantic City Blackjacks	4	8	.333	518	550	3–3	1–5	6	L2
Columbus Destroyers	1	11	.083	394	548	1–5	0–6	9	L5

^{y} - clinched regular season title
^{x} - clinched playoff berth

== Schedule ==
=== Regular season ===
The 2019 regular season schedule was released on February 13, 2019. All times Eastern.

Week	Day	Date	Kickoff	Opponent	Results		Location	Attendance	Report
Week	Day	Date	Kickoff	Opponent	Score	Record	Location	Attendance	Report
1	Friday	April 26	7:00 p.m.	at Baltimore Brigade	L 51–59	0–1	Royal Farms Arena	5,195	
2	Saturday	May 4	7:30 p.m.	at Albany Empire	L 27–36	0–2	Times Union Center	9,208	
3	Saturday	May 11	7:00 p.m.	Atlantic City Blackjacks	W 41–34	1–2	Capital One Arena	8,044	
4	Saturday	May 18	3:30 p.m.	Philadelphia Soul	W 53–46	2–2	Capital One Arena	6,357	
5	Saturday	May 25	3:30 p.m.	at Columbus Destroyers	W 29–27	3–2	Nationwide Arena	6,122	
6	Saturday	June 1	3:30 p.m.	at Albany Empire	L 48–58	3–3	Times Union Center	8,744	
7	Sunday	June 9	4:00 p.m.	at Philadelphia Soul	W 48–41	4–3	Wells Fargo Center	7,164	
8	Saturday	June 15	7:00 p.m.	Albany Empire	L 55–56	4–4	Capital One Arena	7,179	
9	Thursday	June 20	7:00 p.m.	Baltimore Brigade	W 42–35	5–4	Capital One Arena	6,795	
10	Saturday	June 29	7:00 p.m.	Atlantic City Blackjacks	L 41–70	5–5	Capital One Arena	7,136	
11	Bye								
12	Saturday	July 13	7:00 p.m.	at Baltimore Brigade	W 47–40	6–5	Royal Farms Arena	4,609	
13	Saturday	July 20	3:30 p.m.	Columbus Destroyers	W 56–50	7–5	Capital One Arena	8,456	

=== Postseason ===
Round	Day	Date	Kickoff	Opponent	Score	Location	Attendance	Report
SF–1	Sunday	July 28	3:30 p.m.	Philadelphia Soul	L 33–69	Capital One Arena	6,942	
SF–2	Sunday	August 4	4:00 p.m.	at Philadelphia Soul	L 41–48	Wells Fargo Center	8,537	
Aggregate score					L 74–117			

== Game summaries ==
Week 1: at Baltimore (L)

	1	2	3	4	Total
Washington	13	18	7	13	51
Baltimore	14	14	10	21	59

Week 2: at Albany (L)

	1	2	3	4	Total
Washington	7	7	7	6	27
Albany	7	14	7	8	36

Week 3: Atlantic City (W)

	1	2	3	4	Total
Atlantic City	0	7	14	13	34
Washington	6	14	7	14	41

Week 4: Philadelphia (W)

	1	2	3	4	Total
Philadelphia	6	14	14	12	46
Washington	14	14	14	11	53

Week 5: at Columbus (W)

	1	2	3	4	Total
Washington	0	7	14	8	29
Columbus	14	7	3	3	27

Week 6: at Albany (L)

	1	2	3	4	Total
Washington	12	0	21	15	48
Albany	7	23	21	7	58

Week 7: at Philadelphia (W)

	1	2	3	4	Total
Washington	6	14	7	21	48
Philadelphia	7	7	13	14	41

Week 8: Albany (L)

	1	2	3	4	Total
Albany	7	7	21	21	56
Washington	14	20	7	14	55

Week 9: Baltimore (W)

	1	2	3	4	Total
Baltimore	7	14	7	7	35
Washington	7	14	7	14	42

Week 10: Atlantic City (L)

	1	2	3	4	Total
Atlantic City	14	21	14	21	70
Washington	7	21	7	6	41

Week 12: at Baltimore (W)

	1	2	3	4	Total
Washington	13	6	14	14	47
Baltimore	14	12	0	14	40

Week 13: Columbus (W)

	1	2	3	4	Total
Columbus	13	14	14	9	50
Washington	13	14	7	22	56

Semifinal, Leg 1: Philadelphia (L)

	1	2	3	4	Total
Philadelphia	6	14	21	28	69
Washington	7	0	13	13	33

Semifinal, Leg 2: at Philadelphia (L)

	1	2	3	4	Total
Washington	6	22	13	0	41
Philadelphia	14	21	6	7	48
