= 2019 Baltimore Brigade season =

Arena football season

- Owner: Monumental Sports & Entertainment
- Head coach: Omarr Smith
- Home stadium: Royal Farms Arena

Results
- Record: 8–6
- League place: 4th
- Playoffs: Semifinals, Lost vs. #1 Albany

The 2019 Baltimore Brigade season was the third season for the Baltimore Brigade in the Arena Football League. The Brigade played at the Royal Farms Arena and were coached by Omarr Smith for the 2019 season.

== Standings ==
2019 Arena Football League standings
Team	Overall			Points		Records			
Team	W	L	PCT	PF	PA	Home	Away	GB	STK
Albany Empire ^{xy}	10	2	.833	620	474	5–1	5–1	—	W2
Washington Valor ^{x}	7	5	.583	538	552	4–2	3–3	3	W2
Philadelphia Soul ^{x}	7	5	.583	523	530	4–2	3–3	3	L1
Baltimore Brigade ^{x}	7	5	.583	500	439	4–2	3–3	3	W1
Atlantic City Blackjacks	4	8	.333	518	550	3–3	1–5	6	L2
Columbus Destroyers	1	11	.083	394	548	1–5	0–6	9	L5

^{y} - clinched regular season title
^{x} - clinched playoff berth

== Schedule ==
=== Regular season ===
The 2019 regular season schedule was released on February 13, 2019. All times Eastern.

Week	Day	Date	Kickoff	Opponent	Results		Location	Attendance	Report
Week	Day	Date	Kickoff	Opponent	Score	Record	Location	Attendance	Report
1	Friday	April 26	7:00 p.m.	Washington Valor	W 59–51	1–0	Royal Farms Arena	5,195	
2	Friday	May 3	7:00 p.m.	Philadelphia Soul	L 27–36	1–1	Royal Farms Arena	4,381	
3	Friday	May 10	7:00 p.m.	Columbus Destroyers	W 48–30	2–1	Royal Farms Arena	4,990	
4	Saturday	May 18	7:00 p.m.	at Atlantic City Blackjacks	L 41–48	2–2	Boardwalk Hall	4,054	
5	Sunday	May 26	3:00 p.m.	Philadelphia Soul	W 45–30	3–2	Royal Farms Arena	4,079	
6	Saturday	June 1	3:30 p.m.	at Atlantic City Blackjacks	L 34–35	3–3	Boardwalk Hall	4,632	
7	Saturday	June 8	7:30 p.m.	at Albany Empire	W 42–41	4–3	Times Union Center	10,287	
8	Saturday	June 15	3:30 p.m.	at Columbus Destroyers	W 44–39	5–3	Nationwide Arena	6,260	
9	Thursday	June 20	7:00 p.m.	at Washington Valor	L 35–42	5–4	Capital One Arena	6,795	
10	Friday	June 28	7:00 p.m.	Columbus Destroyers	W 50–12	6–4	Royal Farms Arena	4,206	
11	Bye								
12	Saturday	July 13	7:00 p.m.	Washington Valor	L 40–47	6–5	Royal Farms Arena	4,609	
13	Sunday	July 21	4:00 p.m.	at Atlantic City Blackjacks	W 35–28	7–5	Boardwalk Hall	6,266	

=== Postseason ===
Round	Day	Date	Kickoff	Opponent	Score	Location	Attendance	Report
SF–1	Saturday	July 27	7:00 p.m.	at Albany Empire	L 26–61	Times Union Center	9,085	
SF–2	Saturday	August 3	7:00 p.m.	Albany Empire	L 21–62	Royal Farms Arena	5,282	
Aggregate score					L 47–123			

== Game summaries ==
Week 1: Washington (W)

	1	2	3	4	Total
Washington	13	18	7	13	51
Baltimore	14	14	10	21	59

Week 2: Philadelphia (L)

	1	2	3	4	Total
Philadelphia	6	6	18	6	36
Baltimore	6	8	7	6	27

Week 3: Columbus (W)

	1	2	3	4	Total
Columbus	0	10	13	7	30
Baltimore	7	14	7	20	48

Week 4: at Atlantic City (L)

	1	2	3	4	Total
Baltimore	0	13	6	22	41
Atlantic City	13	7	7	21	48

Week 5: Philadelphia (W)

	1	2	3	4	Total
Philadelphia	13	7	7	3	30
Baltimore	7	14	14	10	45

Week 6: at Atlantic City (L)

	1	2	3	4	Total
Baltimore	7	20	7	0	34
Atlantic City	7	14	14	0	35

Week 7: at Albany (W)

	1	2	3	4	Total
Baltimore	14	14	14	0	42
Albany	7	14	14	6	41

Week 8: at Columbus (W)

	1	2	3	4	Total
Atlantic City	13	7	14	10	44
Philadelphia	13	7	7	12	39

Week 9: at Washington (L)

	1	2	3	4	Total
Baltimore	7	14	7	7	35
Washington	7	14	7	14	42

Week 10: Columbus (W)

	1	2	3	4	Total
Columbus	0	12	0	0	12
Baltimore	7	14	15	14	50

Week 12: Washington (L)

	1	2	3	4	Total
Washington	13	6	14	14	47
Baltimore	14	12	0	14	40

Week 13: at Atlantic City (W)

	1	2	3	4	Total
Baltimore	0	21	0	14	35
Atlantic City	0	7	7	14	28

Semifinal, Leg 1: at Albany (L)

	1	2	3	4	Total
Baltimore	6	0	7	13	26
Albany	7	14	20	20	61

Semifinal, Leg 2: Albany (L)

	1	2	3	4	Total
Albany	21	28	6	7	62
Baltimore	7	0	7	7	21

== Roster ==
Baltimore Brigade roster
Quarterbacks: 8 Shane Boyd; 7 Shawn Mooney; Fullbacks: 23 Rory Nixon; Wide receivers: 17 Brandon Collins; 81 Joe Hills; 14 Brandon Thompkins; 84 Milton Williams	Offensive linemen: 44 Rodney Austin; 74 Wilson Bell; 72 Kaleb Johnson; 75 Kyron Samuels; 60 Jeremiah Warren; Defensive linemen: 2 Darryl Cato-Bishop; 9 Robert Hayes; 48 Royce LaFrance; 99 Justin Lawrence	Linebackers: 18 Joe Goosby; 55 Dexter Jackson; Defensive backs: 5 Saqwan Edwards; 3 Nias Martin; 1 Joe Powell; 7 Josh Victorian; 24 Kenric Young; Kickers: -- T. C. Stevens	Reserve lists: -- Lance Austin DB (IR); 92 Robert Barber; -- Chris Boles OL (IR); -- Christian Boutte DB (Exempt); 61 Jarell Broxton OL (IR); 22 Brandon Brown K (IR); -- Antoine Everett OL (IR); -- Keyarris Garrett WR (DNR); -- Garrett Hughes DL (Susp.); -- Christopher Lee DL (IR); 70 Colin Madison OL (IR); 15 Maurice Morgan WR (IR); -- Phazahn Odom WR (Susp.); -- Ian Park OL (Susp.); -- Ervin Philips WR (IR); -- Jamal Robinson DB (IR); -- Khalil Rodgers OL (DNR); -- Javon Rolland-Jones DL (Exempt); -- Tashon Smallwood DL (Susp.); -- Frank Stephens WR (Exempt); -- Caylon Weathers WR (IR); Recallable reassignment: Currently vacant; Rookies in italics Roster updated May 16, 2019; 24 Active, 21 Inactive → More rosters
