= Domonique Young =

American football coach (born 1994)

Current position
- Title: Wide Receivers Coach / Recruiting Coordinator
- Team: Midwestern State Mustangs

Biographical details
- Born: October 27, 1994 (age 32); Los Angeles, California, U.S.
- Education: Purdue University

Playing career
- 2013–2014: Cerritos College
- 2015–2016: Purdue Boilermakers
- Position: Wide receiver

Coaching career (HC unless noted)
- 2020: Trinity Christian Academy (WR/ST)
- 2022–2023: West Virginia (GA WR/TE)
- 2023: Stetson (WR)
- 2024: Stetson (WR/STC)
- 2025–present: Midwestern State (WR/RC)

Domonique Ja’Ron Young (born October 27, 1994) is an American football coach and former wide receiver. He is currently the wide receivers coach and recruiting coordinator for the Midwestern State Mustangs. Young played college football at Cerritos College and Purdue University, and later pursued professional opportunities across several leagues.

== Playing career ==
=== Cerritos College ===
Young attended Cerritos College from 2013 to 2014, where he became the program’s all-time leader in receptions and receiving yards. He earned All-State, Regional, and National Northern honors and was named his team’s Offensive MVP. He also contributed to two bowl victories during his tenure.

=== Purdue University ===
At Purdue, Young played during the 2015 and 2016 seasons. Across both years, he totaled 50 receptions for 614 yards and two touchdowns, averaging 12.3 yards per catch.

==== 2015 season (Junior year) ====
In 2015, Young appeared in 11 games with seven starts, recording 21 receptions for 276 yards and one touchdown. Notable performances include:

- 5 catches for 107 yards and one touchdown at No. 24 Northwestern
- 4 catches for 52 yards at No. 6 Iowa.

==== Cerritos cumulative statistics ====
As a sophomore at Cerritos, Young amassed 53 receptions for 939 yards and nine touchdowns, with six receptions for 71 yards.

== College statistics ==
=== Receiving ===
Domonique Young collegiate receiving statistics
Season	Team	Games	Receptions	Yards	Touchdowns	Yards per catch
2013	Cerritos	--	6	71	0	11.8
2014	Cerritos	--	53	939	9	17.7
2015	Purdue	11	21	276	1	13.1
2016	Purdue	10	29	338	1	11.7
Career total		21*	109	1,624	11	14.9

*Cerritos games played not fully documented

== Coaching career ==
=== Trinity Christian Academy (2020–2021) ===
Young’s first coaching role was as wide receivers coach and special teams coordinator at Trinity Christian Academy in Florida. He contributed to the team winning the FHSAA 3A State Championship in 2020.

=== West Virginia University (2022–2023) ===
He served as a graduate assistant coaching wide receivers and tight ends at West Virginia University for the 2022–2023 seasons.

=== Stetson University (2023–2024) ===
In 2023, Young joined the Stetson Hatters football staff as wide receivers coach and was promoted in 2024 to wide receivers coach and special teams coordinator. During the 2023 season, Young coached Ronnel Johnson, who was named Pioneer Football League Offensive Rookie of the Year after recording 19 receptions for 366 yards, including multiple 100-yard receiving performances. Johnson’s season-high performance included nine receptions for 155 yards and two touchdowns against San Diego.

=== Midwestern State University (2025–present) ===
Young was named wide receivers coach and recruiting coordinator at Midwestern State University beginning with the 2025 season. During his first season on staff, the Mustangs’ receiver corps produced multiple conference-recognized performances. Wide receiver Cedonyae Lott set the Midwestern State single-game receiving yards record with 284 receiving yards and four touchdowns in a victory over Western New Mexico and later earned first-team All–Lone Star Conference honors.

Under Young’s position-group leadership, Midwestern State receivers ranked among conference leaders in receiving yardage and touchdowns during the 2025 season, reflecting growth in the program’s passing offense within the Lone Star Conference.

=== Coaching record ===
Domonique Young coaching history
Year	Team	Position
2020	Trinity Christian Academy	Wide Receivers / Special Teams Coordinator
2022–2023	West Virginia University	Graduate Assistant (WR/TE)
2023	Stetson University	Wide Receivers Coach
2024	Stetson University	Wide Receivers / Special Teams Coordinator
2025–present	Midwestern State University	Wide Receivers / Recruiting Coordinator

== Personal life ==
Domonique Ja’Ron Young was born in Los Angeles, California, on October 27, 1994.
