= Grant Russell =

American football quarterback

No. 12
- Position: Quarterback

Personal information
- Born: September 26, 1995 (age 31)
- Listed height: 6 ft 4 in (1.93 m)
- Listed weight: 220 lb (100 kg)

Career information
- High school: Newark (Newark, Ohio)
- College: Ohio Dominican
- NFL draft: 2018: undrafted

Career history
- Baltimore Brigade (2019)*; Columbus Destroyers (2019); Carolina Cobras (2020)*; Wheeling Miners (2024–2025)
- * Offseason or practice squad member only

Awards and highlights
- AAL2 champion (2024); AAL2 MVP (2024); G-MAC Player of the Year (2017)
- Stats at ArenaFan.com

Grant Russell (born September 26, 1995) is an American former professional football quarterback who played for the Columbus Destroyers of the Arena Football League (AFL). He played college football for the Ohio Dominican Panthers, and was named the Great Midwest Athletic Conference Player of the Year as a senior in 2017.

== Early life ==
Grant Russell was born on September 26, 1995. He attended Newark High School in Newark, Ohio, where he was a multi-year letterman in baseball, basketball and football.

== College career ==
After not receiving much consideration from Division I football schools, Russell enrolled at Ohio Dominican University, where he joined the football team. He saw limited action at Ohio Dominican as a freshman. During the 2015 season, he started eleven games. He became a Harlon Hill Trophy candidate in 2016 and was named the Great Midwest Athletic Conference Player of the Year as a senior in 2017. Russell finished his college career with totals of 700 completions on 1,022 attempts for 8,729 yards, 73 touchdowns, 20 interceptions, and 14 rushing touchdowns.

== Professional career ==
On March 7, 2019, Russell was assigned to the Baltimore Brigade of the Arena Football League (AFL). On March 11, 2019, he was traded to the Columbus Destroyers for future considerations. After being named the backup to Danny Southwick to open the season, Russell entered the Destroyers' first game of the regular season in relief of an ineffective Southwick. Russell completed his first professional touchdown to Jenson Stoshak in the third quarter. He later ran in a score during the fourth quarter. Overall in 2019, Russell completed 183 of 300 passes (61.0%) for 2,132 yards, 36 touchdowns, and 14 interceptions while also rushing 30 times for 75 yards and four touchdowns.

Russell signed with the Carolina Cobras of the National Arena League (NAL) for the 2020 season.

Russell played for the Wheeling Miners of the American Arena League 2 (AAL2) in 2024. He led the Miners to a 10–0 record. In the league championship game, he threw six touchdowns in a 61–14 victory over the Peach State Cats. Russell was named both the AAL2 MVP and the Offensive Player of the Year for the 2024 season. The Miners moved up to the NAL for the 2025 season. Russell played part of the 2025 season with the Miners before retiring.
