= ArenaBowl XXXII =

2019 Arena Football League championship game

Philadelphia Soul	Albany Empire
27	45
	1	2	3	4	Total
PHI	14	7	0	6	27
ALB	14	21	7	3	45
- Date: August 11, 2019
- Stadium: Times Union Center; Albany, New York
- MVP: Tommy Grady (QB, Albany)
- Attendance: 12,042
- Winning coach: Rob Keefe
- Losing coach: Clint Dolezel

TV in the United States
- Network: ESPN2
- Announcers: Jon Meterparel, Sherdrick Bonner, Meredith Gorman and J. J. Raterink

ArenaBowl XXXII was the 32nd ArenaBowl and the championship game of the 2019 Arena Football League season. The game took place on August 11, 2019, with kickoff at 8:00 p.m. EDT on ESPN2. It featured the winners of the two semifinals, the No. 1 seed Albany Empire and the No. 3 seed Philadelphia Soul.

AFL Commissioner Randall Boe also confirmed that the league's expansion plans for next season would be unveiled during the game; however, these plans were pushed back to several weeks after the game after Boe said that negotiations for the two new teams would not be finished in time. The league ultimately filed for Chapter 7 bankruptcy on November 27 of that year, making the game the final one in the league's history.

== Venue ==
As the higher seed, the No. 1 Albany Empire hosted ArenaBowl XXXII at the Times Union Center.

== 2019 playoffs ==
Semifinals
1	Albany Empire	61	62	123
4	Baltimore Brigade	26	21	47
2	Washington Valor	33	41	74
3	Philadelphia Soul	69	48	117

ArenaBowl XXXII
1	Albany Empire	45
3	Philadelphia Soul	27

== Teams ==
=== Albany Empire ===
The Empire, led by head coach Rob Keefe, finished the regular season 10–2 and earned the No. 1 seed for the second straight season. They defeated No. 4 Baltimore home and away in the semifinal to advance to their first ArenaBowl.

=== Philadelphia Soul ===
The Soul, led by head coach Clint Dolezel, finished the regular season 7–5 and earned the No. 3 seed for the second straight season. They defeated No. 2 Washington home and away in the semifinal to advance to their sixth ArenaBowl; they are 3–2 in previous appearances.

=== Series record ===
The all-time series between the Empire and the Soul dates back to the Empire's inaugural game on April 14, 2018. Entering the game, Albany led the series 4–3.

Albany victories	Philadelphia victories

No.	Date	Location	Winner	Score
1	April 14, 2018	Albany, NY	Philadelphia	56–35
2	May 19, 2018	Philadelphia, PA	Albany	41–36
3	June 16, 2018	Albany, NY	Philadelphia	75–74
4	July 7, 2018	Albany, NY	Albany	71–57
5	May 11, 2019	Philadelphia, PA	Albany	57–48
6	June 29, 2019	Philadelphia, PA	Philadelphia	54–43
7	July 20, 2019	Albany, NY	Albany	72–27
Series: Albany leads 4–3

== Game summary ==
Scoring summary
Qtr.	Time	Team	Scoring play	Score
1	12:09	Philadelphia	Darius Prince 34 yard pass from Dan Raudabaugh; Kenny Spencer kick good	Philadelphia 7, Albany 0
1	6:58	Albany	Maurice Leggett 54 yard interception return; Adrian Trevino kick good	Philadelphia 7, Albany 7
1	4:58	Philadelphia	B. J. Bunn 38 yard pass from Dan Raudabaugh; Kenny Spencer kick good	Philadelphia 14, Albany 7
1	1:56	Albany	Quentin Sims 11 yard pass from Tommy Grady; Adrian Trevino kick good	Philadelphia 14, Albany 14
2	9:59	Albany	Quentin Sims 6 yard pass from Tommy Grady; Adrian Trevino kick good	Philadelphia 14, Albany 21
2	4:56	Philadelphia	Darius Prince 4 yard pass from Dan Raudabaugh; Kenny Spencer kick good	Philadelphia 21, Albany 21
2	3:23	Albany	Quentin Sims 25 yard pass from Tommy Grady; Adrian Trevino kick good	Philadelphia 21, Albany 28
2	0:22	Albany	Quentin Sims 11 yard pass from Tommy Grady; Adrian Trevino kick good	Philadelphia 21, Albany 35
3	10:06	Albany	Mykel Benson 8 yard pass from Tommy Grady; Adrian Trevino kick good	Philadelphia 21, Albany 42
4	13:09	Philadelphia	Lonnie Outlaw 3 yard pass from Dan Raudabaugh; Kenny Spencer kick missed	Philadelphia 27, Albany 42
4	9:59	Albany	Adrian Trevino 31 yard field goal	Philadelphia 27, Albany 45

	1	2	3	4	Total
Philadelphia	14	7	0	6	27
Albany	14	21	7	3	45

Statistics	PHI	ALB
First downs	19	14
Total yards	300	208
Rushes–yards	7–0	5–8
Passing yards	300	200
Passing: Comp–Att–Int	26–39–1	16–25–0
Penalties–yards	3–25	3–9

Team	Category	Player	Statistics
Philadelphia	Passing	Dan Raudabaugh	26/39, 300 yds, 4 TD, 1 INT
Philadelphia	Rushing	Adrian Ferns	5 car, 1 yd
Philadelphia	Receiving	B. J. Bunn	10 rec, 129 yds, 1 TD
Albany	Passing	Tommy Grady	16/25, 200 yds, 5 TD
Albany	Rushing	Mykel Benson	3 car, 14 yds, 1 TD
Albany	Receiving	Quentin Sims	9 rec, 93 yds, 4 TD
