= Albany Empire (AFL) =

Arena football team

Logo

General information
- Founded: 2018
- Folded: 2019
- Headquartered: MVP Arena in Albany, New York
- Colors: Fiery reddish orange, dark navy blue, grey
- TheAlbanyEmpire.com

Personnel
- Owners: Trifecta Sports and Entertainment; Main owners: George Randolph Hearst III; Dan Nolan; Ed Swyer; Partner owners (with Philadelphia Soul): Ron Jaworski; Craig Spencer; Pete Ciarrocchi; Cosmo DeNicola; Martin E. Judge; Dick Vermeil; Marques Colston; Jahri Evans; Nicholas Giuffre; Philip Jaurigue; Stewart Anmuth; Gil Peter; Hal Brunson
- Head coach: Rob Keefe
- President: John Adams

Team history
- Albany Empire (2018–2019)

Home fields
- MVP Arena (2018–2019)

League / conference affiliations
- Arena Football League (2018–2019)

Championships
- League championships: 1: 2019

Playoff appearances (2)
- 2018, 2019

The Albany Empire was a professional arena football team based in Albany, New York, that began play in the Arena Football League (AFL) in 2018. Home games were played at MVP Arena located in downtown Albany.

The Empire was Albany's third arena football team and second AFL team; it succeeded the original Albany Firebirds who began AFL play in 1990 and enjoyed great success, most notably winning ArenaBowl XIII, before moving to Indianapolis following the 2000 season, and later the Albany Conquest who played in the af2 developmental league from 2002 until that league folded after the 2009 season (and was known as the Firebirds for that last season).

== History ==
After the American Hockey League's Albany Devils relocated to Binghamton, NY, the Times Union Center was left without a full-time professional tenant. (It remained home to the Siena College men's basketball team of the NCAA Division I Metro Atlantic Athletic Conference.) On March 14, 2017, Center general manager Bob Belber confirmed that it was in early discussions to bring an AFL team back to Albany.

On October 24, the new Albany team was officially announced as a member of the AFL for the 2018 season. The local ownership group (led by George Randolph Hearst III) has partnered with that of their AFL leaguemates the Philadelphia Soul (which includes Ron Jaworski, Dick Vermeil, Marques Colston and Jahri Evans among others) to run both teams' business operations while keeping their football operations separate. (This marks the second time that the AFL has announced two teams with common ownership and management but separate football operations, as the Washington Valor and Baltimore Brigade are both owned and operated by D.C.-area businessman Ted Leonsis but are competitors on the field and separately coached.) On November 7, Rob Keefe was named the Albany team's head coach. On November 9, the Albany team announced that the four team name finalists were the Empire, Fire, Machine and Phoenix. Voting ended on November 15 and the winning name was announced on January 23, 2018, as the Albany Empire.

The team played its first game on April 14, 2018, losing at home to the Philadelphia Soul 56–35 before a sellout crowd of 13,648. On August 11, 2019, the Empire won their first ArenaBowl, defeating the Philadelphia Soul 45–27.

After the 2019 season, the AFL announced it was ceasing operating teams in local markets and looking into becoming a traveling league. However, the entire league filed for bankruptcy in November 2019 and ceased operations.

In 2024, the AFL returned to Albany with a new franchise under new ownership, a revival of the Albany Firebirds.

== Season-by-season results ==
ArenaBowl champions	ArenaBowl appearance	Division champions	Playoff berth

Season	League	Regular season			Postseason results
Season	League	Finish	Wins	Losses	Postseason results
Albany Empire
2018	AFL	1st	8	4	Lost in playoffs (Washington)
2019	AFL	1st	10	2	Won semifinals (Baltimore); Won ArenaBowl XXXII (Philadelphia) 45–27
Total			18	6	(Regular season)
Total			4	1	(Postseason)
Total			22	7	

== Players ==
=== Individual awards ===
Offensive Lineman of the Year
Season	Player	Position
2018	Hayworth Hicks	OL
2019	Ryan Cave	OL

Defensive Lineman of the Year
Season	Player	Position
2018	Joe Sykes	DL

Most Valuable Player
Season	Player	Position
2018	Tommy Grady	QB

Offensive Player of the Year
Season	Player	Position
2018	Tommy Grady	QB
2019	Malachi Jones	WR

Defensive Player of the Year
Season	Player	Position
2018	Terence Moore	LB

Rookie of the Year
Season	Player	Position
2018	Malachi Jones	WR

Kicker of the Year
Season	Player	Position
2019	Adrian Trevino	K

== Personnel ==
=== Head coaches ===
Name	Term	Regular season			Playoffs			Awards
Name	Term	W	L	Win%	W	L	Win%	Awards
Rob Keefe	2018–2019	18	6	.750	4	1	.800	

=== Staff ===
Albany Empire staff
Ownership: Albany ownership group – George Randolph Hearst III; Albany ownership group – Daniel Nolan; Albany ownership group – Ed Swyer; Philadelphia ownership group – Craig A. Spencer; Philadelphia ownership group – Ron Jaworski; Philadelphia ownership group – Pete Ciarrocchi; Philadelphia ownership group – Cosmo DeNicola; Philadelphia ownership group – Martin E. Judge; Philadelphia ownership group – Marques Colston; Philadelphia ownership group – Dick Vermeil; Philadelphia ownership group – Nicholas Giuffre; Philadelphia ownership group – Jahri Evans; Philadelphia ownership group – Philip Jaurigue; Philadelphia ownership group – Stewart Anmuth; Philadelphia ownership group – Gil Peters; Philadelphia ownership group – Hal Brunson	Front office: Chief operating officer – George Manias; Chief ticketing officer – David Beck; Vice president of finance – Carly Griffin; Coaches: Head coach – Rob Keefe; Assistant head coach/general manager – Les Moss; Director of player personnel/line coach – Dave Ewart; Director of player operations – Brandon Goldstein; Head athletic trainer – Brett Allen; As of 2019 season

=== Former radio affiliate (1 station) ===
- WQSH/105.7: Malta
