= 2019 Arena Football League season =

2019 season of the Arena Football League

- League: Arena Football League
- Sport: Arena football
- Duration: April 26 – August 11, 2019

Regular season
- Season champions: Albany Empire

League postseason
- #1 vs #4 champions: Albany Empire (#1)
- #1 vs #4 runners-up: Baltimore Brigade (#4)
- #2 vs #3 champions: Philadelphia Soul (#3)
- #2 vs #3 runners-up: Washington Valor (#2)

ArenaBowl XXXII
- Champions: Albany Empire
- Runners-up: Philadelphia Soul
- Finals MVP: Tommy Grady (Albany)

AFL seasons
- ← 2018

AFL teams

The 2019 Arena Football League season was the 32nd season and final in the history of the Arena Football League (AFL) before filing for bankruptcy. Prior to the start of the season, the league expanded from four to six teams with two added expansion teams. The 12-game regular season began on April 26 and ended on July 21.

== League business ==
=== Teams ===
For the first time since 2011, the AFL entered the season with more teams than it had the previous season, adding an expansion team and reactivating another that had been dormant for over a decade.

The league announced the Atlantic City Blackjacks expansion team on January 22, 2019, that is operated by the same ownership group as the Albany Empire. On February 7, 2019, the league re-added the Columbus Destroyers as another expansion team to bring the league back to six teams.

=== Schedule and playoff changes ===
The 2019 season consisted of a 13-week schedule during which each team played 12 games and had one bye week.

At the end of the regular season, the top four teams participated in the ArenaBowl playoffs, in which the top seed faced the fourth seed while the second seed faced the third seed in a home-and-home series. The team in each series with the highest aggregate score advanced to the ArenaBowl. If the aggregate score in either series was tied after the second game in the home-and-home semifinals, the game would have continued in the AFL's standard overtime format. While the semifinals consisted of two games in each pairing, ArenaBowl XXXII was still one game.

=== Closure ===
The AFL announced it had closed its teams' local operations on October 29, following that with a Chapter 7 bankruptcy liquidation filing November 27.

== Final season standings ==
2019 Arena Football League standings
Team	Overall			Points		Records			
Team	W	L	PCT	PF	PA	Home	Away	GB	STK
Albany Empire ^{xy}	10	2	.833	620	474	5–1	5–1	—	W2
Washington Valor ^{x}	7	5	.583	538	552	4–2	3–3	3	W2
Philadelphia Soul ^{x}	7	5	.583	523	530	4–2	3–3	3	L1
Baltimore Brigade ^{x}	7	5	.583	500	439	4–2	3–3	3	W1
Atlantic City Blackjacks	4	8	.333	518	550	3–3	1–5	6	L2
Columbus Destroyers	1	11	.083	394	548	1–5	0–6	9	L5

^{y} - clinched regular season title
^{x} - clinched playoff berth

== Playoffs ==
Semifinals
1	Albany Empire	61	62	123
4	Baltimore Brigade	26	21	47
2	Washington Valor	33	41	74
3	Philadelphia Soul	69	48	117

ArenaBowl XXXII
1	Albany Empire	45
3	Philadelphia Soul	27

=== Semifinals ===
All times listed are in EDT.

Date	Kickoff	Away	Score	Home	Game site	Recap
Sat. July 27	7:00 p.m.	(4) Baltimore Brigade	26–61	(1) Albany Empire	Times Union Center • Albany, NY	Recap
Sun. July 28	3:30 p.m.	(3) Philadelphia Soul	69–33	(2) Washington Valor	Capital One Arena • Washington, D.C.	Recap
Sat. August 3	7:00 p.m.	(1) Albany Empire	62–21	(4) Baltimore Brigade	Royal Farms Arena • Baltimore, MD	Recap
Sun. August 4	4:00 p.m.	(2) Washington Valor	41–48	(3) Philadelphia Soul	Wells Fargo Center • Philadelphia, PA	Recap

=== ArenaBowl XXXII ===
Date	Kickoff	Away	Score	Home	Game site	Recap
Sun. August 11	8:00 p.m.	(3) Philadelphia Soul	27–45	(1) Albany Empire	Times Union Center • Albany, NY	Recap

== Attendance ==
Announced attendance figures for each home game. In the weekly columns, dashes (—) indicate away games or a bye week, while bold font indicates the highest attendance of each team.

Team / Week	1	2	3	4	5	6	7	8	9	10	11	12	13	SF	AB	Total	Average
**Albany Empire**	11,682	9,208	—	—	—	8,744	10,287	—	9,417	—	—	—	10,981	9,085	**12,042**	81,446	**10,181**
**Philadelphia Soul**	9,245	—	9,843	—	—	8,672	7,164	6,910	—	**10,564**	—	—	—	8,537	—	60,935	**8,705**
**Washington Valor**	—	—	8,044	6,357	—	—	—	7,179	6,795	7,136	—	—	**8,456**	6,942	—	50,909	**7,273**
**Columbus Destroyers**	—	—	—	7,035	6,122	—	6,029	6,260	7,604	—	—	**9,275**	—	N/A		42,325	**7,054**
**Atlantic City Blackjacks**	—	6,139	—	4,054	4,386	4,632	—	—	—	—	**7,104**	—	6,266	N/A		32,581	**5,430**
**Baltimore Brigade**	5,195	4,381	4,990	—	4,079	—	—	—	—	4,206	—	4,609	—	**5,282**	—	32,742	**4,677**
Total	26,122	19,728	22,877	17,446	14,587	22,048	23,480	20,349	23,816	21,906	7,104	13,884	25,703	29,846	12,042	300,938	
Average	8,707	6,576	7,626	5,815	4,862	7,349	7,827	6,783	7,939	7,302	7,104	6,942	8,568	7,462	12,042		7,340

== Awards ==
=== All–Arena teams ===
==== First team ====
Offense
Pos.	Player	Team
QB	Tommy Grady	Albany Empire
FB	Mykel Benson	Albany Empire
WR	Malachi Jones	Albany Empire
WR	Quentin Sims	Albany Empire
WR	Darius Prince	Philadelphia Soul
C	Ryan Cave	Albany Empire
OL	Jordan Mudge	Albany Empire
OL	Neal Tivis	Philadelphia Soul

Defense
Pos.	Player	Team
DE	Joe Sykes	Albany Empire
DE	Darryl Cato-Bishop	Baltimore Brigade
DT	Justin Lawrence	Baltimore Brigade
MLB	Dexter Jackson	Baltimore Brigade
JLB	Terence Moore	Albany Empire
DB	James Romain	Philadelphia Soul
DB	Joe Powell	Baltimore Brigade
DB	Varmah Sonie	Columbus Destroyers

Special Teams
Pos.	Player	Team
K	Adrian Trevino	Albany Empire
ST	Fabian Guerra	Columbus Destroyers

==== Second team ====
Offense
Pos.	Player	Team
QB	Arvell Nelson	Washington Valor
FB	Adrian Ferns	Philadelphia Soul
WR	Antwane Grant	Atlantic City Blackjacks
WR	Lamark Brown	Atlantic City Blackjacks
WR	Joe Hills	Baltimore Brigade
C	Phillipkeith Manley	Philadelphia Soul
C	Kyron Samuels	Baltimore Brigade
OL	Anthony Parker	Washington Valor
OL	Moqut Ruffins	Albany Empire

Defense
Pos.	Player	Team
DE	Monte Lewis	Atlantic City Blackjacks
DE	Sean Daniels	Philadelphia Soul
DT	Terrance Taylor	Columbus Destroyers
MLB	James Gordon	Washington Valor
JLB	Alvin Ray Jackson	Washington Valor
DB	Dwayne Hollis	Philadelphia Soul
DB	Josh Victorian	Baltimore Brigade
DB	Tevin Homer	Albany Empire

Special Teams
Pos.	Player	Team
K	Mark Lewis	Atlantic City Blackjacks
ST	Joe Powell	Baltimore Brigade
