= 2016 Cleveland Gladiators season =

Arena Football League team season

- Owner: Dan Gilbert
- Head coach: Steve Thonn
- Home stadium: Quicken Loans Arena

Results
- Record: 7–9
- Conference place: 3rd National
- Playoffs: Won National Conference Semifinals 56-52 (KISS); Lost National Conference Championship 41-82 (Rattlers)

The 2016 Cleveland Gladiators season was the 17th season for the franchise in the Arena Football League, and their seventh while in Cleveland. The team was coached by Steve Thonn and played their home games at Quicken Loans Arena.

== Standings ==
2016 National Conference standings
Team	Overall			Points			Record	
Team	W	L	PCT	PF	PA	CON	Home	Away
x-Arizona Rattlers	13	3	.813	1,068	766	8–0	8–0	5–3
Los Angeles Kiss	7	9	.438	736	748	4–4	5–4	2–5
Cleveland Gladiators	7	9	.438	826	934	2–4	4–4	3–5
Portland Steel	3	13	.188	670	926	1–7	3–4	0–9

== Schedule ==
=== Regular season ===
The 2016 regular season schedule was released on December 10, 2015.

Week	Day	Date	Kickoff	Opponent	Results		Location	Attendance	Report
Week	Day	Date	Kickoff	Opponent	Score	Record	Location	Attendance	Report
1	Friday	April 1	7:00 p.m. EDT	Philadelphia Soul	L 41–69	0–1	Quicken Loans Arena	12,944	
2	Saturday	April 9	7:00 p.m. EDT	Tampa Bay Storm	W 41–29	1–1	Quicken Loans Arena	11,892	
3	Saturday	April 16	7:30 p.m. EDT	Los Angeles KISS	L 42–47	1–2	Quicken Loans Arena	12,243	
4	Saturday	April 23	4:00 p.m. EDT	at Philadelphia Soul	L 50–67	1–3	Wells Fargo Center	7,057	
5	Friday	April 29	7:00 p.m. EDT	Orlando Predators	L 56–76	1–4	Quicken Loans Arena	13,429	
6	Saturday	May 7	7:30 p.m. EDT	Jacksonville Sharks	W 41–40	2–4	Quicken Loans Arena	8,056	
7	Monday	May 16	8:00 p.m. EDT	Portland Steel	W 55–48 (OT)	3–4	Quicken Loans Arena	6,733	
8	Monday	May 23	7:30 p.m. EDT	at Tampa Bay Storm	W 70–63 (OT)	4–4	Amalie Arena	9,722	
9	Saturday	May 28	7:00 p.m. EDT	Philadelphia Soul	W 63–49	5–4	Quicken Loans Arena	11,278	
10	Friday	June 3	7:00 p.m. EDT	Arizona Rattlers	L 62–77	5–5	Quicken Loans Arena	11,797	
11	Monday	June 13	7:30 p.m. EDT	at Orlando Predators	L 56–59	5–6	Amway Center	11,117	
12	Monday	June 20	10:00 p.m. EDT	at Portland Steel	W 58–49	6–6	Moda Center	4,516	
13	Saturday	June 25	7:00 p.m. EDT	at Jacksonville Sharks	W 48–47	7–6	Jacksonville Veterans Memorial Arena	10,645	
14	Bye								
15	Saturday	July 9	6:00 p.m. EDT	at Philadelphia Soul	L 62–83	7–7	Wells Fargo Center	5,593	
16	Saturday	July 16	10:00 p.m. EDT	at Los Angeles KISS	L 61–63	7–8	Honda Center	8,069	
17	Sunday	July 24	9:00 p.m. EDT	at Arizona Rattlers	L 20–68	7–9	Talking Stick Resort Arena	12,823	
18	Bye								

=== Playoffs ===
Round	Day	Date	Kickoff	Opponent	Results	Location	Attendance	Report
NC Semifinals	Sunday	August 7	6:00 p.m. EDT	at Los Angeles Kiss	W 56–52	Valley View Casino Center	4,269	
NC Championship	Saturday	August 13	9:00 p.m. EDT	at Arizona Rattlers	L 41–82	Talking Stick Resort Arena	15,103	

== Roster ==
2016 Cleveland Gladiators roster
Quarterbacks: 2 Arvell Nelson; 15 Stephen Panasuk; Fullbacks: 22 Collin Keoshian; 44 Phillipkeith Manley; Wide receivers: 10 Larry Beavers; 6 Thyron Lewis; 18 Quentin Sims; 17 Collin Taylor; 13 Devin Wilson	Offensive linemen: 69 D. J. Brandel; 74 Joe Madsen; 78 Chris Jasperse; 66 Jesse Somsel; 72 Aslam Sterling; Defensive linemen: 96 Randy Colling; 8 Isaiah Dunning; 99 Nick Seither; 93 Curtis Young	Linebackers: Currently vacant; Defensive backs: 20 Joe Phinisee; 21 Joe Powell; 9 Kelvin Rodgers; 4 Marvin Ross; 1 Brandon Stephens; Kickers: 19 Adrian Trevino	Injured reserve: 33 Brian Brikowski DL; 70 Skyler Burkland OL; -- Josiah Holt WR; 75 Chad Schofield OL; Other league exempt: Currently vacant; League suspension: 3 Shaine Boyle DB; 49 Tim Cheatwood DL; -- Donnie Fletcher DB; 16 Dominick Goodman WR; 12 Dennis Havrilla QB; 2 Dominic Jones DB; 77 Jayson Palmgren OL; 9 Robert Rose DL; Inactive reserve: 11 Alim Koroma DL; 3 Demarcus Robinson DB; Refuse to report: 73 Adrian Battles OL; Recallable reassignment: Currently vacant; Rookies in italics Roster updated August 11, 2016; 24 Active, 15 Inactive
