= 2016 Orlando Predators season =

Arena Football League team season

- Owner: David A. Siegel
- General manager: Michael DiJulio
- Head coach: Rob Keefe
- Home stadium: Amway Center

Results
- Record: 12–4
- Conference place: 2nd American
- Playoffs: Lost American Conference Semifinals 68-69 (Sharks)

The 2016 Orlando Predators season was the twenty-fifth and final season for the franchise in the Arena Football League. The team was coached by Rob Keefe and played their home games at the Amway Center.

== Standings ==
2016 American Conference standings
Team	Overall			Points			Records	
Team	W	L	PCT	PF	PA	CON	Home	Away
x-Philadelphia Soul	13	3	.813	983	776	5–1	7–1	6–2
Orlando Predators	12	4	.750	893	781	5–3	6–2	6–2
Jacksonville Sharks	7	9	.438	829	774	5–3	3–5	4–4
Tampa Bay Storm	2	14	.125	568	868	0–8	2–6	0–8

== Schedule ==
=== Regular season ===
The 2016 regular season schedule was released on December 10, 2015

Week	Day	Date	Kickoff	Opponent	Results		Location	Attendance	Report
Week	Day	Date	Kickoff	Opponent	Score	Record	Location	Attendance	Report
1	Friday	April 1	7:00 p.m. EDT	at Tampa Bay Storm	W 76–25	1–0	Amalie Arena	9,928	
2	Saturday	April 9	7:30 p.m. EDT	Portland Steel	W 53–50	2–0	Amway Center	10,732	
3	Monday	April 18	7:00 p.m. EDT	at Jacksonville Sharks	W 63–56	3–0	Jacksonville Veterans Memorial Arena	7,835	
4	Saturday	April 23	7:00 p.m. EDT	Los Angeles KISS	W 43–40	4–0	Amway Center	10,127	
5	Friday	April 29	7:00 p.m. EDT	at Cleveland Gladiators	W 76–56	5–0	Quicken Loans Arena	13,429	
6	Saturday	May 7	7:30 p.m. EDT	Arizona Rattlers	W 77–59	6–0	Amway Center	10,512	
7	Friday	May 13	7:30 p.m. EDT	Tampa Bay Storm	W 42–40	7–0	Amway Center	12,971	
8	Saturday	May 21	7:30 p.m. EDT	at Philadelphia Soul	L 54–62	7–1	Wells Fargo Center	12,127	
9	Friday	May 27	7:30 p.m. EDT	Jacksonville Sharks	L 56–59	7–2	Amway Center	10,651	
10	Sunday	June 5	6:00 p.m. EDT	at Los Angeles KISS	W 43–41	8–2	Honda Center	6,287	
11	Sunday	June 11	7:30 p.m. EDT	Cleveland Gladiators	W 59–56	9–2	Amway Center	11,117	
12	Saturday	June 18	7:00 p.m. EDT	at Jacksonville Sharks	W 44–34	10–2	Jacksonville Veterans Memorial Arena	9,835	
13	Friday	June 24	7:30 p.m. EDT	Tampa Bay Storm	W 56–33	11–2	Amway Center	13,527	
14	Bye								
15	Saturday	July 9	10:00 p.m. EDT	at Portland Steel	W 47–41	12–2	Moda Center	4,458	
16	Monday	July 18	9:30 p.m. EDT	at Arizona Rattlers	L 45–62	12–3	Talking Stick Resort Arena	9,628	
17	Bye								
18	Saturday	July 30	7:30 p.m. EDT	Philadelphia Soul	L 59–67	12–4	Amway Center	13,827	

=== Playoffs ===
Round	Day	Date	Kickoff	Opponent	Results	Location	Attendance	Report
AC Semifinals	Saturday	August 6	7:00 p.m. EDT	Jacksonville Sharks	L 68–69 (OT)	Amway Center	12,171	

== Roster ==
2016 Orlando Predators roster
Quarterbacks: 5 Bernard Morris; 13 Danny Southwick; Fullbacks: 47 John Martinez; Wide receivers: 1 Larry Brackins; 11 LaMark Brown; 81 Paul Browning; 4 Greg Carr; 14 Brandon Thompkins	Offensive linemen: 65 Chad Anderson; 62 Sam Longo; 51 Will Maxwell; 63 Jordan McCray; 64 Justin McCray; Defensive linemen: 90 Monte Lewis; 56 Willie McGinnis; 67 Terrance Taylor; 32 Brandon Tett	Linebackers: 92 Calvin Fance; 8 Terence Moore; Defensive backs: 21 Emanuel Cook; 9 Kent Richardson; 10 Varmah Sonie; 3 Paul Stephens; Kickers: 18 Mark Lewis	Injured reserve: 13 Chase Cartwright QB; 80 Brelan Chancellor WR; 71 C. J. Cobb OL; -- Brandan Green WR; 12 Randy Hippeard QB; 24 Arthur Hobbs DB; 74 Adam Shead OL; Other league exempt: 90 Austin Brown DL; -- Brandon Copeland LB; -- T. J. Fatinikun DL; -- Montell Garner DB; -- Nathan Isles OL; 78 Erle Ladson OL; -- Earl Okine DL; -- Khalil Paden WR; 32 Nick Taylor DB; League suspension: 77 Logan Harrell DL; 24 Rod Issac DB; Refused to report: -- Donte Paige-Moss DL; -- Xavier Proctor DL; Inactive reserve: 44 Zach Anderson DL; 2 Darryl Cato-Bishop DL; Recallable reassignment: Currently vacant; Rookies in italics Roster updated August 5, 2016; 24 Active, 22 Inactive

== Staff ==
Orlando Predators staff
Front office: Owner – David A. Siegel; President – Jared Saft; Operations and sponsorships - Darrell Harbin; General manager of football operations - Michael DiJulio; Director of ticket sales - Aubrey Jones	Head coach: Head coach – Rob Keefe; Offensive coaches: Offensive coordinator – Matthew Sauk; Offensive line coach – Steve Edwards; Defensive coaches: Defensive line coach – Steve Edwards
