= 2016 Portland Steel season =

Arena Football League team season

- Owner: Arena Football League
- Head coach: Ron James
- Home stadium: Moda Center

Results
- Record: 3–13
- Conference place: 4th National
- Playoffs: Lost National Conference Semifinals 40-84 (Rattlers)

The 2016 Portland Steel season was the third and final season for the arena football franchise in the Arena Football League (AFL). The team was coached by Ron James and played their home games at the Moda Center.

== Standings ==
2016 National Conference standings
Team	Overall			Points			Record	
Team	W	L	PCT	PF	PA	CON	Home	Away
x-Arizona Rattlers	13	3	.813	1,068	766	8–0	8–0	5–3
Los Angeles Kiss	7	9	.438	736	748	4–4	5–4	2–5
Cleveland Gladiators	7	9	.438	826	934	2–4	4–4	3–5
Portland Steel	3	13	.188	670	926	1–7	3–4	0–9

== Schedule ==
=== Regular season ===
The 2016 regular season schedule was released on December 10, 2015.

Week	Day	Date	Kickoff	Opponent	Results		Location	Attendance	Report
Week	Day	Date	Kickoff	Opponent	Score	Record	Location	Attendance	Report
1	Friday	April 1	10:00 p.m. EDT	Arizona Rattlers	L 28–80	0–1	Moda Center	6,782	
2	Saturday	April 9	7:30 p.m. EDT	at Orlando Predators	L 50–53	0–2	Amway Center	10,732	
3	Sunday	April 17	4:00 p.m. EDT	at Philadelphia Soul	L 32–70	0–3	Wells Fargo Center	8,782	
4	Bye								
5	Saturday	April 30	9:00 p.m. EDT	at Arizona Rattlers	L 21–68	0–4	Talking Stick Resort Arena	11,510	
6	Monday	May 9	10:00 p.m. EDT	at Los Angeles KISS	L 27–66	0–5	Honda Center	9,235	
7	Friday	May 13	7:00 p.m. EDT	at Cleveland Gladiators	L 48–55 (OT)	0–6	Quicken Loans Arena	6,733	
8	Saturday	May 21	7:30 p.m. EDT	at Jacksonville Sharks	L 34–65	0–7	Jacksonville Veterans Memorial Arena	10,208	
9	Saturday	May 28	10:00 p.m. EDT	at Los Angeles KISS	L 42–54	0–8	Honda Center	7,150	
10	Monday	June 6	10:00 p.m. EDT	Tampa Bay Storm	W 68–35	1–8	Moda Center	5,136	
11	Saturday	June 11	9:00 p.m. EDT	at Arizona Rattlers	L 49–76	1–9	Talking Stick Resort Arena	14,401	
12	Monday	June 20	10:00 p.m. EDT	Cleveland Gladiators	L 49–58	1–10	Moda Center	4,516	
13	Monday	June 27	10:00 p.m. EDT	Philadelphia Soul	L 38–59	1–11	Moda Center	4,468	
14	Bye								
15	Saturday	July 9	10:00 p.m. EDT	Orlando Predators	L 41–47	1–12	Moda Center	4,458	
16	Saturday	July 16	10:00 p.m. EDT	Jacksonville Sharks	W 55–53	2–12	Moda Center	4,793	
17	Saturday	July 23	5:00 p.m. EDT	at Tampa Bay Storm	L 40–41	2–13	Amalie Arena	8,958	
18	Monday	August 1	10:00 p.m. EDT	Los Angeles KISS	W 48–46	3–13	Moda Center	5,236	

=== Playoffs ===
Round	Day	Date	Kickoff	Opponent	Results	Location	Attendance	Report
NC Semifinals	Saturday	August 6	10:00 p.m. EDT	at Arizona Rattlers	L 40–84	Talking Stick Resort Arena	13,192	

== Roster ==
2016 Portland Steel roster
Quarterbacks: 10 Shane Austin; 1 Darron Thomas; Fullbacks: 66 Deveric Gallington; Wide receivers: 3 Rashaad Carter; 5 Tom Gilson; 6 Jared Perry; 7 Jabin Sambrano; 81 Nick Truesdell	Offensive linemen: 79 John Collins; 55 Mark Jackson; 77 Kevin Myers; Defensive linemen: 11 Dexter Davis Jr.; 8 K. C. Obi; 59 Visesio Salt, Jr.; 91 Brandon Sesay; 23 Reggie Wilson	Linebackers: 99 Robert Hayes; Defensive backs: 21 Shaine Boyle; 9 Sergio Gilliam; 13 Arness Ikner; 20 Bryce Peila; 13 Matt Pierce; 2 Christian Wise; Kickers: 17 Ernesto Lacayo	Injured reserve: 12 Tyrone Goard WR; -- Jamar Howard WR; 36 Bryson Kelly DL; 2 Colt Lyerla WR; 4 Mike McMillan DB; 8 Terrence Mitchell DB; 64 Jarien Moreland OL; 72 Duke Robinson OL; 80 James Shaw WR; 21 Tim Shelley DB; 84 Darryl Thompson WR; Other league exempt: -- Delano Johnson DL; 8 Douglas McNeil III WR; 4 Osagie Odiase DB; 13 Eric Rogers WR; -- Joshua Stangby WR; League suspension: 15 Perez Ashford WR; -- Larry Banks OL; 45 Adrian Hamilton DL; -- Darius Savage OL; 14 Maurice Williams WR; Inactive reserve: 64 Leonardo Bates OL; Team suspension: Currently vacant; Refused to report: -- Oliver Davis DB; Recallable reassignment: Currently vacant; Rookies in italics Roster updated August 4, 2016; 24 Active, 25 Inactive

== Staff ==
Portland Steel staff
Front office: Owner – Arena Football League; President/CEO – Meadow Lemon; General manager – Ron James; Director of player personnel – Vacant; Director of scouting – Vacant; Director of ticket sales – Dave Livingston	Head coach: Head coach – Ron James; Offensive coaches: Offensive line coach – Ron McBride; Wide receivers – Kirk Broussard; Defensive coaches: Defensive coordinator – Will Mulder; Defensive Lineman - Vacant	Sports Medicine: Head athletic trainer – Vacant; Team physician – Vacant; Team physician – Vacant; Team internist – Vacant; Team neurologist – Vacant
