= 2016 Arizona Rattlers season =

Indoor football season

- Owner: Ron Shurts
- General manager: Kevin Guy
- Head coach: Kevin Guy
- Home stadium: Talking Stick Resort Arena

Results
- Record: 13–3
- Conference place: 1st National
- Playoffs: Won National Conference Semifinals 84–40 (Steel); Won National Conference Championship 82–41 (Gladiators); Lost ArenaBowl XXIX 42–56 (Soul)

The 2016 Arizona Rattlers season was the twenty-fourth season for the arena football franchise in the Arena Football League. The team was coached by Kevin Guy and played their home games at Talking Stick Resort Arena. They moved to the Indoor Football League after the season.

== Standings ==
2016 National Conference standings
Team	Overall			Points			Record	
Team	W	L	PCT	PF	PA	CON	Home	Away
x-Arizona Rattlers	13	3	.813	1,068	766	8–0	8–0	5–3
Los Angeles Kiss	7	9	.438	736	748	4–4	5–4	2–5
Cleveland Gladiators	7	9	.438	826	934	2–4	4–4	3–5
Portland Steel	3	13	.188	670	926	1–7	3–4	0–9

== Schedule ==
=== Regular season ===
The 2016 regular season schedule was released on December 10, 2015.

Week	Day	Date	Kickoff	Opponent	Results		Location	Attendance	Report
Week	Day	Date	Kickoff	Opponent	Score	Record	Location	Attendance	Report
1	Friday	April 1	10:00 p.m. EDT	at Portland Steel	W 80–28	1–0	Moda Center	6,782	
2	Saturday	April 9	11:00 p.m. EDT	at Los Angeles KISS	W 69–28	2–0	Honda Center	6,427	
3	Saturday	April 16	9:00 p.m. EDT	Tampa Bay Storm	W 60–27	3–0	Talking Stick Resort Arena	14,872	
4	Saturday	April 23	7:00 p.m. EDT	at Jacksonville Sharks	W 75–68 (OT)	4–0	Jacksonville Veterans Memorial Arena	8,354	
5	Saturday	April 30	9:00 p.m. EDT	Portland Steel	W 68–21	5–0	Talking Stick Resort Arena	11,510	
6	Saturday	May 7	7:30 p.m. EDT	at Orlando Predators	L 59–77	5–1	Amway Center	10,512	
7	Friday	May 14	6:30 p.m. EDT	at Philadelphia Soul	L 58–65	5–2	Wells Fargo Center	8,580	
8	Saturday	May 21	9:00 p.m. EDT	Los Angeles KISS	W 47–34	6–2	Talking Stick Resort Arena	14,519	
9	Sunday	May 29	2:00 p.m. EDT	at Tampa Bay Storm	L 56–63	6–3	Amalie Arena	8,298	
10	Friday	June 3	7:00 p.m. EDT	at Cleveland Gladiators	W 77–62	7–3	Quicken Loans Arena	11,797	
11	Saturday	June 11	9:00 p.m. EDT	Portland Steel	W 76–49	8–3	Talking Stick Resort Arena	14,401	
12	Friday	June 17	10:00 p.m. EDT	Philadelphia Soul	W 80–63	9–3	Talking Stick Resort Arena	11,067	
13	Sunday	June 26	6:00 p.m. EDT	at Los Angeles KISS	W 64–49	10–3	Honda Center	7,090	
14	Bye								
15	Saturday	July 9	9:30 p.m. EDT	Jacksonville Sharks	W 69–67	11–3	Talking Stick Resort Arena	11,874	
16	Monday	July 18	9:30 p.m. EDT	Orlando Predators	W 62–45	12–3	Talking Stick Resort Arena	9,628	
17	Sunday	July 24	9:00 p.m. EDT	Cleveland Gladiators	W 68–20	13–3	Talking Stick Resort Arena	12,823	
18	Bye								

=== Playoffs ===
Round	Day	Date	Kickoff	Opponent	Results	Location	Attendance	Report
NC Semifinals	Saturday	August 6	10:00 p.m.EDT	Portland Steel	W 84–40	Talking Stick Resort Arena	13,192	
NC Championship	Saturday	August 13	9:00 p.m.EDT	Cleveland Gladiators	W 82–41	Talking Stick Resort Arena	15,103	
ArenaBowl XXIX	Friday	August 26	7:00 p.m.EDT	Philadelphia Soul	L 42–56	Gila River Arena	13,390	

== Roster ==
2016 Arizona Rattlers roster
Quarterbacks: 8 Shane Boyd; 10 Nick Davila; Fullbacks: 9 Mykel Benson; Wide receivers: 88 Anthony Amos; 12 Dan Buckner; -- Julius Gregory; 2 Maurice Purify; -- Antonio Vaughan; 1 Rod Windsor	Offensive linemen: 75 Hayworth Hicks; 70 Jordan Mudge; 72 Dionte Savage; 52 Michael Simons; Defensive linemen: 32 Damien Borel; 17 Rodney Fritz; 96 Dimetrio Tyson; 93 Luis Vasquez	Linebackers: 94 Tyre Glasper; Defensive backs: 11 Arkeith Brown; 16 Keiron Jones; 20 Jeremy Kellem; 3 K. J. Morten; 14 Al Phillips; Kickers: -- Nich Pertuit; 5 Kenny Spencer	Injured reserve: 24 Allen Chapman DB; 81 Chase Deadder WR; 23 Antonio Dennard DB; 77 Anttaj Hawthorne DL; 97 Leon Mackey DL; 55 Lamar Mady OL; 13 Joe Matthews WR; 31 Chris McAllister DL; 15 Kerry Reed WR; -- Deuce Robinson DL; 5 Markus Smith DB; 4 Alex Zendejas K; League suspension: 19 Marquis Floyd DB; -- Sam Meredith DL; Other league exempt: -- A. J. Cruz DB; -- Derek Dennis OL; -- Michael Huey OL; -- Mike McAdoo DL; Refused to report: -- Ikponmwosa Igbinosun DL; -- Alfred McCullough OL; Inactive reserve: 6 Cliff Dukes DL; 68 Keith Williams DL; Recallable reassignment: Currently vacant; Rookies in italics Roster updated August 12, 2016; 25 Active, 22 Inactive
