= Steve Thonn =

American football coach

Profile
- Position: Wide receiver / defensive back

Personal information
- Listed height: 5 ft 10 in (1.78 m)
- Listed weight: 175 lb (79 kg)

Career information
- College: Wheaton College
- NFL draft: 1988: undrafted

Career history

Playing
- Chicago Bruisers (1988); Albany Firebirds (1990–1993)

Coaching
- Albany Firebirds (1994) (WR/ST); Connecticut Coyotes (1995) (OC); Milwaukee Mustangs (1996) (OC); Houston Thunderbears (1998–2001); Georgia Force (2004–2007) (OC); Grand Rapids Rampage (2008); Cleveland Gladiators (2010–2016); Washington Valor (2017) (OC)

Awards and highlights
- Marcum-Moss Head Coach of the Year (2014)

Career AFL statistics
- Receptions: 66
- Yards: 682
- Touchdowns: 11
- Tackles: 43
- Interceptions: 6
- Stats at ArenaFan.com

Head coaching record
- Regular season: 85–109 (.438)
- Postseason: 5–5 (.500)
- Career: 90–114 (.441)

Steve Thonn (pronounced TUN) is an American football coach. He was previously a head coach in the Arena Football League (AFL) for the Houston Thunderbears, Grand Rapids Rampage and Cleveland Gladiators. Thonn is also a former AFL player. He played WR/DB for the Chicago Bruisers (1988) and the Albany Firebirds (1990–1993). He was the offensive coordinator of the Georgia Force from 2004 to 2007 before being hired as the Rampage head coach.

== College career ==
Thonn attended Wheaton College and was a student and a letterman in football, basketball, and baseball. In football, he was named as a Division III All-America selection as a senior.

== Playing career ==
=== Chicago Bruisers ===
Thonn played with the Chicago Bruisers of the Arena Football League in 1988, after going undrafted. Thonn played both wide receiver and defensive back in the ironman league. Thonn's play helped the Bruisers reach ArenaBowl II, where they lost to the Detroit Drive.

=== Albany Firebirds ===
Thonn played the 1990 through 1993 seasons with the Albany Firebirds.

=== Stats ===
Year	Team	Rec	Yards	TD
1988	Chicago	21	209	2
1990	Albany	14	138	2
1991	Albany	6	113	3
1992	Albany	1	4	0
1993	Albany	24	218	4
	Career	66	682	11

== Coaching career ==
=== Cleveland Gladiators ===
Thonn was hired by the Cleveland Gladiators on December 22, 2009, as their new head coach in time for the franchise to restart in the resurrected Arena Football League. His contract was not renewed at the end of the 2016 season.

=== Head coaching record ===
Team	Year	Regular season				Postseason			
Team	Year	Won	Lost	Win %	Finish	Won	Lost	Win %	Result
HOU	1998	8	6	.571	1st in AC Central	0	1	.000	Lost to Arizona Rattlers in Quarterfinals
HOU	1999	4	10	.286	4th in AC Central	–	–	–	–
HOU	2000	3	11	.214	4th in AC Central	–	–	–	–
HOU	2001	3	11	.214	4th in AC Western	–	–	–	–
HOU total		18	38	.321	–	–	–	–	
GR	2008	6	10	.375	3rd in AC Central	2	1	.667	Lost to San Jose SaberCats in Conference Championship
CLE	2010	7	9	.438	3rd in NC Midwest	–	–	–	–
CLE	2011	10	8	.556	1st in AC East	0	1	.500	Lost to Georgia Force in Conference Semifinals
CLE	2012	8	10	.444	2nd in AC East	–	–	–	–
CLE	2013	4	14	.222	2nd in AC East	–	–	–	–
CLE	2014	17	1	.944	1st in AC East	2	1	.667	Lost to Arizona Rattlers in ArenaBowl XVI
CLE	2015	8	10	.444	2nd in AC East	0	1	.500	Lost to Philadelphia Soul in Conference Semifinals
CLE	2016	7	9	.438	3rd in NC	1	1	.500	Lost to Arizona Rattlers in Conference Championship
CLE total		61	61	.500		3	4	.429	–
Total		85	109	.438		5	5	.500	
