= 2016 Philadelphia Soul season =

Arena Football League team season

- Owner: Ron Jaworski; Craig Spencer; Pete Ciarrocchi
- General manager: Thomas Goodhines
- Head coach: Clint Dolezel
- Home stadium: Wells Fargo Center (to May 2016); PPL Center (July 2016 onward)

Results
- Record: 13–3
- Conference place: 1st American
- Playoffs: Won American Conference Semifinals 63–41 (Storm); Won American Conference Championship 55–50 (Sharks); Won ArenaBowl XXIX 56-42 (Rattlers)

The 2016 Philadelphia Soul season was the eleventh season for the franchise in the Arena Football League. The 2016 season was Clint Dolezel's fourth season with the franchise. The Soul played most of their home games at the Wells Fargo Center, but then moved their last regular season game and all playoff contests to the PPL Center in the Lehigh Valley city of Allentown.

== Standings ==
2016 American Conference standings
Team	Overall			Points			Records	
Team	W	L	PCT	PF	PA	CON	Home	Away
x-Philadelphia Soul	13	3	.813	983	776	5–1	7–1	6–2
Orlando Predators	12	4	.750	893	781	5–3	6–2	6–2
Jacksonville Sharks	7	9	.438	829	774	5–3	3–5	4–4
Tampa Bay Storm	2	14	.125	568	868	0–8	2–6	0–8

== Schedule ==
=== Regular season ===
The 2016 regular season schedule was released on December 10, 2015.

Week	Day	Date	Kickoff	Opponent	Results		Location	Attendance	Report
Week	Day	Date	Kickoff	Opponent	Score	Record	Location	Attendance	Report
1	Friday	April 1	7:00 p.m. EDT	at Cleveland Gladiators	W 69–41	1–0	Quicken Loans Arena	12,944	
2	Monday	April 11	7:00 p.m. EDT	Jacksonville Sharks	L 41–59	1–1	Wells Fargo Center	8,550	
3	Sunday	April 17	4:00 p.m. EDT	Portland Steel	W 70–32	2–1	Wells Fargo Center	8,782	
4	Saturday	April 23	4:00 p.m. EDT	Cleveland Gladiators	W 67–50	3–1	Wells Fargo Center	7,057	
5	Monday	May 2	10:00 p.m. EDT	at Los Angeles KISS	W 56–33	4–1	Honda Center	6,193	
6	Monday	May 9	7:00 p.m. EDT	Tampa Bay Storm	W 47–17	5–1	Wells Fargo Center	8,172	
7	Saturday	May 14	6:30 p.m. EDT	Arizona Rattlers	W 65–58	6–1	Wells Fargo Center	8,580	
8	Saturday	May 21	7:30 p.m. EDT	Orlando Predators	W 62–54	7–1	Wells Fargo Center	12,127	
9	Saturday	May 28	7:00 p.m. EDT	at Cleveland Gladiators	L 49–63	7–2	Quicken Loans Arena	11,278	
10	Saturday	June 4	7:00 p.m. EDT	at Jacksonville Sharks	W 56–42	8–2	Jacksonville Veterans Memorial Arena	10,985	
11	Saturday	June 11	3:00 p.m. EDT	Los Angeles KISS	W 73–37	9–2	Sun National Bank Center	5,802	
12	Friday	June 17	10:00 p.m. EDT	at Arizona Rattlers	L 63–80	9–3	Talking Stick Resort Arena	11,067	
13	Monday	June 27	10:00 p.m. EDT	at Portland Steel	W 59–38	10–3	Moda Center	4,468	
14	Bye								
15	Saturday	July 9	6:00 p.m. EDT	Cleveland Gladiators	W 83–62	11–3	PPL Center	5,593	
16	Saturday	July 16	4:00 p.m. EDT	at Tampa Bay Storm	W 56–51	12–3	Amalie Arena	8,406	
17	Bye								
18	Saturday	July 30	7:30 p.m. EDT	at Orlando Predators	W 67–54	13–3	Amway Center	13,827	

=== Playoffs ===
Round	Day	Date	Kickoff	Opponent	Results	Location	Attendance	Report
AC Semifinals	Sunday	August 7	6:00 p.m. EDT	Tampa Bay Storm	W 63–41	PPL Center	5,540	
AC Championship	Sunday	August 14	6:00 p.m. EDT	Jacksonville Sharks	W 55–50	PPL Center	4,721	
ArenaBowl XXIX	Friday	August 26	7:00 p.m.EDT	at Arizona Rattlers	W 56–42	Gila River Arena	13,390	

== Roster ==
2016 Philadelphia Soul roster
Quarterbacks: 10 Luke Collis; 5 Dan Raudabaugh; Fullbacks: 3 Jeramie Richardson; Wide receivers: 1 Chris Duvalt; 21 Shaun Kauleinamoku; 19 Ryan McDaniel; 4 Lonnie Outlaw; 7 Darius Reynolds	Offensive linemen: 72 Keith Newell; 76 Adam Smith; 77 Neal Tivis; 69 Wayne Tribue; Defensive linemen: 93 Richard Clebert; 98 Ted Jennings; 99 Justin Lawrence; 8 Jake Metz; 95 Ben Perry	Linebackers: 2 Beau Bell; 18 Joe Goosby; Defensive backs: 6 Tracy Belton; 22 Dwayne Hollis; 25 James Romain; 23 LaRico Stevenson; Kicker: 11 Tommy Frevert	Injured reserve: 14 Chris Dieker QB; 17 Wesley Mauia LB; Refused to report: Currently vacant; League suspension: Currently vacant; Other league exempt: -- Maurice Leggett DB; Inactive reserve: 55 Sean Daniels DL; 24 Torez Jones DB; Recallable reassignment: Currently vacant; Rookies in italics Roster updated August 22, 2016; 24 Active, 5 Inactive
