= 2016 Tampa Bay Storm season =

Arena Football League team season

- Owner: Jeffrey Vinik
- Head coach: Lawrence Samuels
- Home stadium: Amalie Arena

Results
- Record: 2–14
- Conference place: 4th American
- Playoffs: Lost American Conference Semifinals 41–63 (Soul)

The 2016 Tampa Bay Storm season was the twenty-eighth season for the franchise in the Arena Football League. The team was coached by Lawrence Samuels and played their home games at the Amalie Arena.

== Standings ==
2016 American Conference standings
Team	Overall			Points			Records	
Team	W	L	PCT	PF	PA	CON	Home	Away
x-Philadelphia Soul	13	3	.813	983	776	5–1	7–1	6–2
Orlando Predators	12	4	.750	893	781	5–3	6–2	6–2
Jacksonville Sharks	7	9	.438	829	774	5–3	3–5	4–4
Tampa Bay Storm	2	14	.125	568	868	0–8	2–6	0–8

== Schedule ==
=== Regular season ===
The 2016 regular season schedule was released on December 10, 2015

Week	Day	Date	Kickoff	Opponent	Results		Location	Attendance	Report
Week	Day	Date	Kickoff	Opponent	Score	Record	Location	Attendance	Report
1	Friday	April 1	7:00 p.m. EDT	Orlando Predators	L 25–76	0–1	Amalie Arena	9,928	
2	Saturday	April 9	7:00 p.m. EDT	at Cleveland Gladiators	L 29–41	0–2	Quicken Loans Arena	11,892	
3	Saturday	April 16	9:00 p.m. EDT	at Arizona Rattlers	L 27–60	0–3	Talking Stick Resort Arena	14,872	
4	Bye								
5	Sunday	May 1	2:00 p.m. EDT	Jacksonville Sharks	L 27–33	0–4	Amalie Arena	8,438	
6	Monday	May 9	7:00 p.m. EDT	at Philadelphia Soul	L 17–47	0–5	Wells Fargo Center	8,172	
7	Friday	May 13	7:30 p.m. EDT	at Orlando Predators	L 40–42	0–6	Amway Center	12,971	
8	Monday	May 23	7:30 p.m. EDT	Cleveland Gladiators	L 63–70 (OT)	0–7	Amalie Arena	9,722	
9	Sunday	May 29	2:00 p.m. EDT	Arizona Rattlers	W 63–56	1–7	Amalie Arena	8,298	
10	Monday	June 6	10:00 p.m. EDT	at Portland Steel	L 35–68	1–8	Moda Center	5,136	
11	Saturday	June 11	5:00 p.m. EDT	Jacksonville Sharks	L 34–67	1–9	Amalie Arena	8,418	
12	Saturday	June 18	7:30 p.m. EDT	Los Angeles KISS	L 27–57	1–10	Amalie Arena	9,670	
13	Friday	June 24	7:30 p.m. EDT	at Orlando Predators	L 33–56	1–11	Amway Center	13,527	
14	Bye								
15	Monday	July 11	10:00 p.m. EDT	at Los Angeles KISS	L 21–48	1–12	Honda Center	6,249	
16	Saturday	July 16	4:00 p.m. EDT	Philadelphia Soul	L 51–56	1–13	Amalie Arena	8,406	
17	Saturday	July 23	5:00 p.m. EDT	Portland Steel	W 41–40	2–13	Amalie Arena	8,958	
18	Saturday	July 30	5:00 p.m. EDT	at Jacksonville Sharks	L 35–54	2–14	Jacksonville Veterans Memorial Arena	10,324	

=== Playoffs ===
Round	Day	Date	Kickoff	Opponent	Results	Location	Attendance	Report
AC Semifinals	Sunday	August 7	6:00 p.m. EDT	at Philadelphia Soul	L 41–63	PPL Center	5,540	

== Roster ==
2016 Tampa Bay Storm roster
Quarterbacks: 16 Jason Boltus; 2 Warren Smith; Fullbacks: 43 John Brown; Wide receivers: 11 Phillip Barnett; 17 Kendrick Ings; 10 V'Keon Lacey; 15 Prechae Rodriguez; 1 T. T. Toliver	Offensive linemen: 44 R. J. Bibbs; 79 Ben Ossai; 72 Anthony Parker; 70 Isaiah Shelton; Defensive linemen: 93 Everett Dawkins; 94 James McClinton; 56 Jerry Turner; 99 David Washington	Linebackers: 50 James Gordon; Defensive backs: 23 Nick Addison; 6 Qua Cox; 5 James Harrell; 13 Dallas Jackson; 18 Cameron McGlenn; 21 Cortez Stubbs; Kickers: 12 Delbert Alvarado	Injured reserve: 15 Xavier Boyce WR; 72 Bruce Doyle OL; 4 Rick-J Hill DB; 74 Andrew Miller OL; 55 Dominie Pittman DL; 77 Isaiah Tuiasosopo OL; 29 Seth Williams DB; 3 Gerald Young WR; Inactive reserve: Currently vacant; League suspension: 98 Torrey Davis DL; 75 Cornelius Dixon OL; 99 Justin Edison DL; 8 Adam Kennedy QB; 77 Jesse Peterson OL; Other league exempt: -- Delvin Breaux DB; 54 Padric Scott DL; Refuse to report: 64 Travis Miller OL; 74 Keyun Swinney OL; Recallable reassignment: Currently vacant; Rookies in itlatics Roster updated August 4, 2016; 24 Active, 17 Inactive
