= Arvell Nelson =

American football quarterback (born 1988)

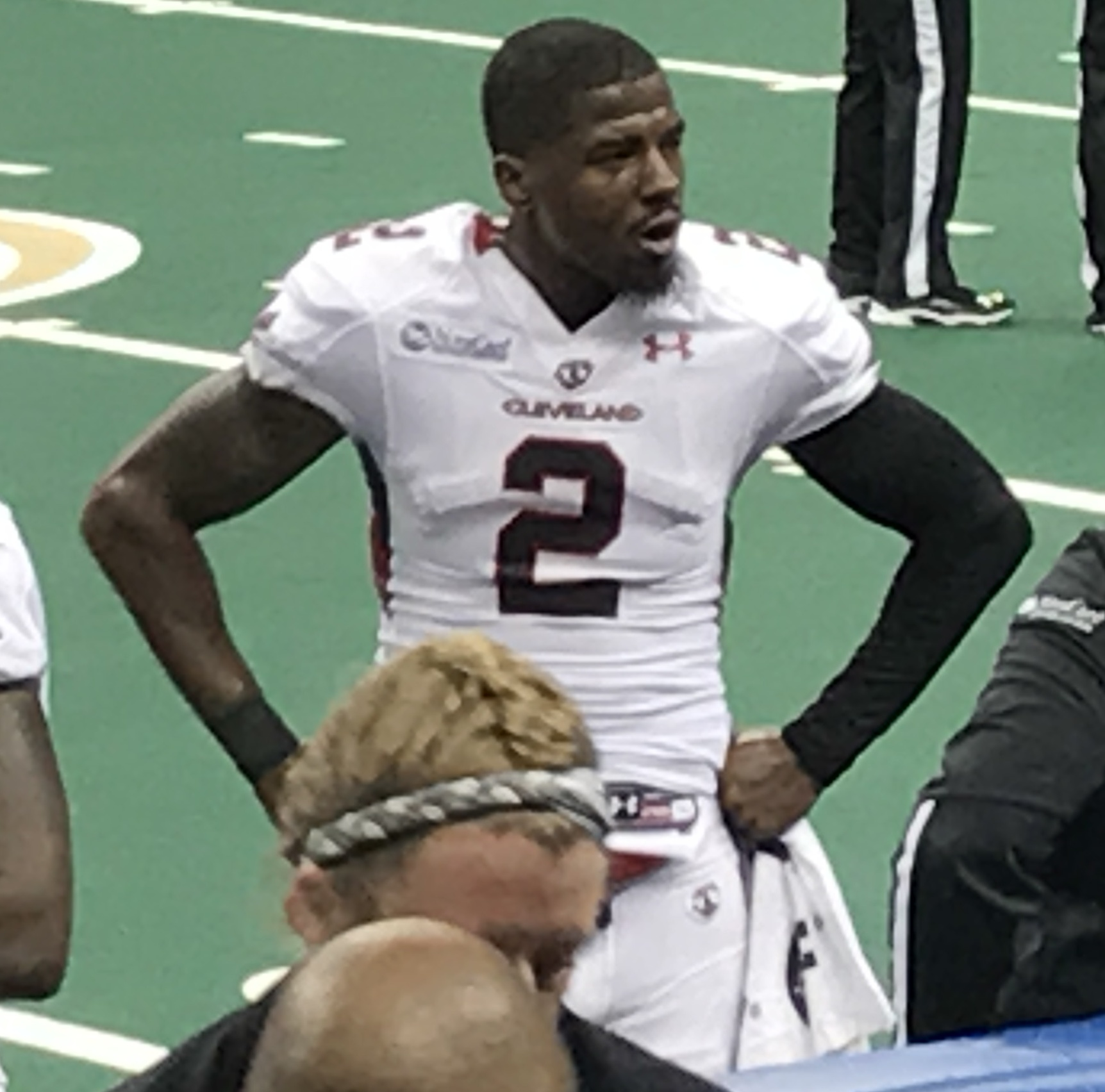
- Nelson with the Cleveland Gladiators in 2017

No. 2, 7, 12, 4
- Positions: Quarterback, linebacker

Personal information
- Born: September 27, 1988 (age 38); Cleveland, Ohio, U.S.
- Listed height: 6 ft 5 in (1.96 m)
- Listed weight: 230 lb (104 kg)

Career information
- High school: Glenville (Cleveland)
- College: Texas Southern
- NFL draft: 2011: undrafted

Career history
- Alabama Hammers (2012); Spokane Shock (2013); Pittsburgh Power (2014); Spokane Shock (2015); Cleveland Gladiators (2016–2017); Richmond Roughriders (2018); Washington Valor (2018–2019); Jacksonville Sharks (2022); San Antonio Gunslingers (2023); Las Vegas Rockers (2026)

Awards and highlights
- ArenaBowl champion (2018); ArenaBowl MVP (2018); SWAC Newcomer of the Year (2009); Second-team All-KJCCC (2008)

Career AFL statistics
- Comp. / Att.: 996 / 1,649
- Passing yards: 12,331
- TD–INT: 236–53
- QB rating: 105.96
- Rushing TDs: 61
- Stats at ArenaFan.com

Arvell Nelson (born September 27, 1988) is an American professional football quarterback and linebacker who played in the Arena Football League (AFL). He was signed by the Alabama Hammers as an undrafted free agent in 2012. He played college football at University of Iowa, before transferring to Fort Scott Community College and Texas Southern University.

== Early life ==
Nelson attended Glenville High School in Cleveland, Ohio, where he was a quarterback for the Tarblooders football team. Nelson's quarterback play landed him scholarship opportunities at Iowa, Michigan State, North Carolina, Syracuse, Tennessee and Wisconsin.

College recruiting
Name	Hometown	School	Height	Weight	40^{‡}	Commit date
Arvell Nelson; QB	Cleveland, Ohio	Glenville High School	6 ft 4 in (1.93 m)	171 lb (78 kg)	4.9	Jan 18, 2006
Arvell Nelson; QB	Recruit ratings: Scout: Rivals: 247Sports: (73)					
Overall recruit ranking: Scout: 24 (QB) Rivals: 22 (QB), 32 (OH) ESPN: 80 (QB), 31 (OH), 81 (Midwest)
‡ Refers to 40-yard dash; Note: In many cases, Scout, Rivals, 247Sports, On3, and ESPN may conflict in their listings of height, weight and 40 time.; In these cases, the average was taken. ESPN grades are on a 100-point scale.; Sources: "Iowa Football Commitment List (21)". Rivals.; "Iowa College Football Recruiting Commits". Scout.; "ESPN". ESPN.; "Scout.com Team Recruiting Rankings". Scout.; "2006 Team Ranking". Rivals.com.; "247". 247Sports.

== College career ==
=== Iowa ===
Nelson choose to commit to the University of Iowa, where he redshirted during his freshman season. As a redshirt freshman in 2007, Nelson was given the opportunity to compete with Jake Christensen for the Hawkeyes starting quarterback spot, but Christensen won, and Nelson was named the team's backup quarterback. Nelson saw his first college playing time in the Hawkeyes second game of the season, a 35–0 victory over Syracuse. Nelson completed his only pass attempt for 12 yards. Nelson would later be moved to wide receiver, losing the backup quarterback position to Ricky Stanzi. Nelson was dismissed from the Hawkeyes football team by head coach Kirk Ferentz.

=== Fort Scott ===
In 2008, Nelson enrolled at Fort Scott Community College, where he joined the football team as a safety. Nelson also saw time playing quarterback, but his play at safety lead him to being named second-team All-Kansas Jayhawk Community College Conference.

=== Texas Southern ===
Nelson choose to enroll at Texas Southern University in 2009, where he was named the starting quarterback for the Tigers. Nelson was named the Southwestern Athletic Conference Newcomer of the Year after finishing second in the conference in passing yards and passing touchdowns. In 2010, Nelson returned as the starter for the Tigers, and lead them to a west division title. Nelson however missing the SWAC Championship Game due to an NCAA violation. The Tigers ended up winning the SWAC Championship Game without Nelson, The NCAA later revoked the teams championship due to a major sports violation.

== Professional career ==
Nelson was rated the 51st best quarterback in the 2011 NFL draft by NFLDraftScout.com.

Pre-draft measurables
Height	Weight	40-yard dash	10-yard split	20-yard split	20-yard shuttle	Three-cone drill	Vertical jump	Broad jump	Bench press
6 ft 4 in (1.93 m)	224 lb (102 kg)	4.96 s	1.76 s	2.93 s	4.42 s	7.06 s	29 in (0.74 m)	8 ft 8 in (2.64 m)	6 reps
All values from Texas Southern Pro Day

=== Alabama Hammers ===
After going undrafted in the 2011 NFL draft, Nelson signed with the Alabama Hammers of the Professional Indoor Football League (PIFL). Nelson was named the team's starting quarterback for the first eight games of the season, before being replaced by Tony Colston.

=== Spokane Shock ===
Nelson was assigned to the Spokane Shock of the Arena Football League (AFL) on November 8, 2012. Nelson was brought in to compete for playing time at quarterback, with former Shocker starter Kyle Rowley departing for the Orlando Predators. Nelson made the team as a backup to Erik Meyer. Nelson lined up at a multitude of positions for the Shock, making his debut as a quarterback, only to run the football. It wasn't until the Shock's Week 11 game against the San Jose SaberCats when Nelson attempted his first pass. Nelson finished the season with 5 touchdown passes on 16-of-20 attempts, while also getting 6 rushing touchdowns, and 4 receiving touchdowns.

The Shock picked up their rookie option on Nelson in September 2013.

=== Pittsburgh Power ===
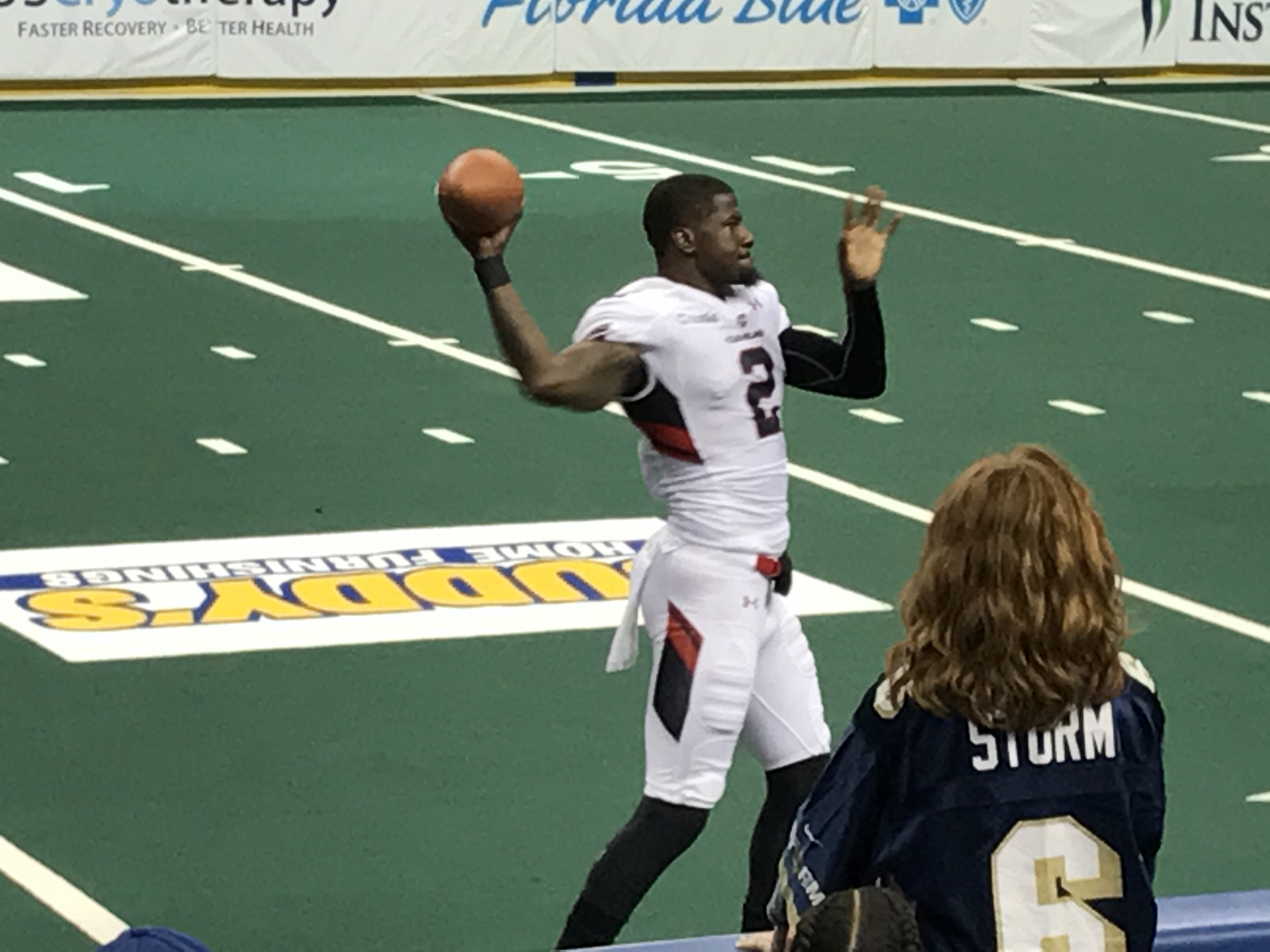
Nelson warming up his arm. (2017)

On October 3, 2013, the Shock traded Nelson and Ben Ossai for Pittsburgh Power wide receiver Mike Washington. The Power folded in November 2014.

=== Spokane Shock ===
On January 5, 2015, Nelson was reassigned to the Shock. After spending the first 12 weeks of the season on the refused to report list, Nelson was activated on June 16, 2015.

=== Cleveland Gladiators ===
In March 2016, Nelson was assigned to the Cleveland Gladiators. He began the season at jack linebacker for the Gladiators but became the starting quarterback after injuries to Chris Dieker and Dennis Havrilla. He made his first start at quarterback for the team on April 29, 2016 after Havrilla was injured, throwing for 332 yards and six touchdowns in a 76–56 loss to the Orlando Predators. Nelson threw for 3,425 yards and 70 touchdowns in 2016. On March 25, 2017, Nelson was placed on recallable reassignment. Nelson was assigned to the Gladiators on April 12, 2017. Nelson made his first start of the season for the Gladiators on April 22, 2017. Nelson was the third different starting quarterback the Gladiators had used in three games.

=== Richmond Roughriders ===
Nelson signed with the Richmond Roughriders of the American Arena League in April 2018.

=== Washington Valor ===
Nelson was assigned to the Washington Valor on May 29, 2018. He led the Valor to a 69–55 victory in ArenaBowl XXXI and was named the ArenaBowl Most Valuable Player.

=== Jacksonville Sharks ===
Nelson signed with the Jacksonville Sharks in Week 6 of the 2022 season where he threw for 40 touchdowns and 11 interceptions.

=== San Antonio Gunslingers ===
On March 16, 2023, Nelson signed with the San Antonio Gunslingers of the National Arena League (NAL). Nelson became a free agent at the end of the season.

=== Las Vegas Rockers ===
On January 22, 2026, the Las Vegas Rockers of the International Arena League (IAL) signed as the very first player signed by the team.

=== AFL statistics ===
Legend
	ArenaBowl MVP
	Won the ArenaBowl
	Led the league
**Bold**	Career high

Year	Team	Passing							Rushing			Receiving			Defense									
Year	Team	Cmp	Att	Pct	Yds	TD	Int	Rtg	Att	Yds	TD	Rec	Yds	TD	Tkl	Ast	Sck	PB	FF	FR	Blk	Int	Yds	TD
2013	Spokane	16	20	**80.0**	162	5	0	**140.00**	14	24	4	9	67	6	11	10	0.0	0	0	0	0	0	0	0
2014	Pittsburgh	7	13	53.8	67	1	0	87.66	11	42	2	4	30	0	48	24	1.5	4	2	4	0	5	61	2
2015	Spokane	101	175	57.7	1,104	18	7	85.51	33	86	7	0	0	0	0	0	0.0	0	0	0	0	0	0	0
2016	Cleveland	**261**	**439**	59.5	**3,425**	**70**	11	113.28	59	211	11	0	0	0	12	8	0.0	0	0	0	0	1	8	0
2017	Cleveland	242	378	64.0	3,084	61	13	114.68	51	221	12	0	0	0	4	1	0.0	0	0	0	0	0	0	0
2018	Washington	129	212	60.8	1,509	27	7	0.00	26	127	6	0	0	0	0	0	0.0	0	0	0	0	0	0	0
2019	Washington	240	412	58.3	2,980	54	**15**	98.36	**75**	**226**	**19**	0	0	0	1	0	0.0	0	0	0	0	0	0	0
Career		996	1,649	60.4	12,331	236	53	105.96	269	937	61	13	97	6	76	43	1.5	4	2	4	0	6	69	2
