= Chase Cartwright =

American football player and coach (born 1992)

No. 13, 9
- Position: Quarterback

Personal information
- Born: August 6, 1992 (age 34); Phoenix, Arizona, U.S.
- Listed height: 6 ft 3 in (1.91 m)
- Listed weight: 220 lb (100 kg)

Career information
- High school: Tempe (AZ) Corona del Sol
- College: Northern Arizona
- NFL draft: 2015: undrafted

Career history
- Orlando Predators (2016); Arizona Rattlers (2017)*; Baltimore Brigade (2017)
- * Offseason or practice squad member only

Career AFL statistics
- Comp. / Att.: 3 / 9
- Passing yards: 21
- TD–INT: 0–1
- QB rating: 2.78
- Rushing TD: 0
- Stats at ArenaFan.com

Chase Mallory Cartwright (born August 6, 1992) is an American football coach and former quarterback who is currently the head coach at San Tan Charter School. He played college football at Northern Arizona University and attended Corona del Sol High School in Tempe, Arizona. He was a member of the Orlando Predators, Arizona Rattlers, and Baltimore Brigade.

== Early life ==
College recruiting
Name	Hometown	School	Height	Weight	Commit date
Chase Cartwright; QB	Tempe, Arizona	Corona del Sol High School	6 ft 6 in (1.98 m)	205 lb (93 kg)	Feb 2, 2010
Chase Cartwright; QB	Recruit ratings: Scout: Rivals: ESPN: (72)				
Overall recruit ranking: Scout: 118 (QB) Rivals: – (QB), – (AZ) 247Sports: – (QB) ESPN: 124 (QB)
Note: In many cases, Scout, Rivals, 247Sports, On3, and ESPN may conflict in their listings of height and weight.; In these cases, the average was taken. ESPN grades are on a 100-point scale.; Sources: "Northern Arizona College Football Recruiting Commits". Scout.; "ESPN". ESPN.; "Scout.com Team Recruiting Rankings". Scout.; "2010 Team Ranking". Rivals.com.; "Chase Cartwright". 247Sports.

== College career ==
Cartwright played for the Northern Arizona Lumberjacks from 2010 to 2014. He was the team's starter his final three years and helped the Lumberjacks to 24 wins. He played in 19 games during his career, including 11 starts.

=== Statistics ===
Year	Team	Passing								Rushing			
Year	Team	Cmp	Att	Pct	Yds	Y/A	TD	Int	Rtg	Att	Yds	Avg	TD
2011	Northern Arizona	9	13	69.2	130	10.0	0	0	153.2	4	−8	−2.0	0
2012	Northern Arizona	37	79	46.8	461	5.8	3	2	103.3	12	−14	−1.2	0
2013	Northern Arizona	70	111	63.1	753	6.8	8	2	140.2	25	−51	−2.0	0
2014	Northern Arizona	111	194	57.2	1,480	7.6	12	3	138.6	37	−24	−0.6	1
Career		227	397	57.2	2,824	7.1	23	7	132.5	78	−97	−1.2	1

== Professional career ==
In May 2015, Cartwright was one of three quarterbacks who attended rookie minicamp with the Chicago Bears.

=== Orlando Predators ===
Cartwright was assigned to the Orlando Predators of the Arena Football League for the 2016 season on March 23, 2016. He was placed on injured reserve to begin the season. He was reactivated from injured reserve on June 4, placed on injured reserve again on June 14, reactivated from injure reserve on June 23 and placed on injured reserve on July 7, 2016. Cartwright played in two games in 2016, completing one of two passes for eight yards.

=== Arizona Rattlers ===
In October 2016, Cartwright was selected by the Arizona Rattlers during a dispersal draft.

=== Baltimore Brigade ===
Cartwright was assigned to the Baltimore Brigade on January 30, 2017. He started the Brigade's first game of the season against the Washington Valor but was replaced by Shane Carden in the second quarter. Cartwright completed two of seven passes for 13 yards and one interception in the game.

=== Statistics ===
Year	Team	Passing							Rushing		
Year	Team	Cmp	Att	Pct	Yds	TD	Int	Rtg	Att	Yds	TD
2016	Orlando	1	2	50.0	8	0	0	60.42	0	0	0
2017	Baltimore	2	7	28.6	13	0	1	0.00	2	−4	0
Career		3	9	33.3	21	0	1	2.78	2	−4	0

== Coaching career ==
In 2019, Cartwright became the quarterbacks coach for the Wagner Seahawks.

In December 2021, it was reported that Cartwright would be promoted to head football coach of the San Tan Charter School after a season as quarterbacks coach. He joined the San Tan Charter school after leaving the Wagner Seahawks as the quarterbacks coach.

== Personal life ==
Cartwright spent time as a graduate assistant in academic services for the Redhawks of Southeast Missouri State University.
