= James Shaw (wide receiver) =

American football player (born 1989)

No. 80
- Position: Wide receiver

Personal information
- Born: February 27, 1989 (age 37); Birmingham, Alabama, U.S.
- Listed height: 5 ft 11 in (1.80 m)
- Listed weight: 185 lb (84 kg)

Career information
- High school: St. Clair (Odenville, Alabama)
- College: Jacksonville State
- NFL draft: 2012: undrafted

Career history
- Carolina Panthers (2013)*; Pittsburgh Power (2014); Pittsburgh Steelers (2014)*; San Jose SaberCats (2015)*; Portland Steel (2016)
- * Offseason or practice squad member only

Career AFL statistics
- Receptions: 37
- Receiving yards: 374
- Return yards: 300
- Total TDs: 7
- Stats at ArenaFan.com

James Napoleon Shaw (born February 27, 1989) is an American former professional football wide receiver. Shaw played college football at Jacksonville State University. He was a member of the Carolina Panthers, Pittsburgh Power, Pittsburgh Steelers, San Jose SaberCats and Portland Steel.

== Early life ==
Shaw lettered in football and basketball at St. Clair County High School in Odenville, Alabama. He recorded over 750 rushing yards, 250 receiving yards, nine touchdowns and registered 105 tackles on defense as a senior. He was named All-County as a running back and linebacker in 2006. Shaw was also named the St. Clair County Player of the Year and helped the Fighting Saints to a 9–3 record as a junior. He was named to the All-Tournament team during the County Championships in basketball.

== College career ==
Shaw played for the Jacksonville State Gamecocks from 2008 to 2011. He was redshirted in 2007.

== Professional career ==
Shaw was rated the 264th best wide receiver in the 2012 NFL draft by NFLDraftScout.com.

Pre-draft measurables
Height	Weight	40-yard dash	10-yard split	20-yard split	20-yard shuttle	Three-cone drill	Vertical jump	Broad jump
5 ft 10 in (1.78 m)	186 lb (84 kg)	4.70 s	2.73 s	1.61 s	4.15 s	6.89 s	32 in (0.81 m)	9 ft 6 in (2.90 m)
All values from UAB Pro Day

Shaw was signed by the Carolina Panthers of the National Football League (NFL) on February 14, 2013. He was released by the Panthers on August 31, 2013. He was re-signed to the Panthers' practice squad on September 1, 2013. Shaw was released by the Panthers on September 18, 2013.

Shaw was assigned to the AFL's Pittsburgh Power on March 7, 2014. He was placed on Other League Exempt by the Power on August 5, 2014. The Power folded in November 2014.

Shaw signed with the NFL's Pittsburgh Steelers on August 5, 2014. He was released by the Steelers on August 18, 2014.

Shaw was assigned to the San Jose SaberCats of the AFL on December 23, 2014.

On May 26, 2016, Shaw was assigned to the Portland Steel of the AFL.

He participated in The Spring League in 2017.

=== Statistics ===
Year	Team	Receiving			Returns		
Year	Team	Rec	Yds	TD	Ret	Yds	TD
2014	Pittsburgh	21	192	3	15	296	0
2016	Portland	16	182	3	1	4	0
Career		37	374	6	16	300	0
