= Bernard Morris =

American football player (born 1985)

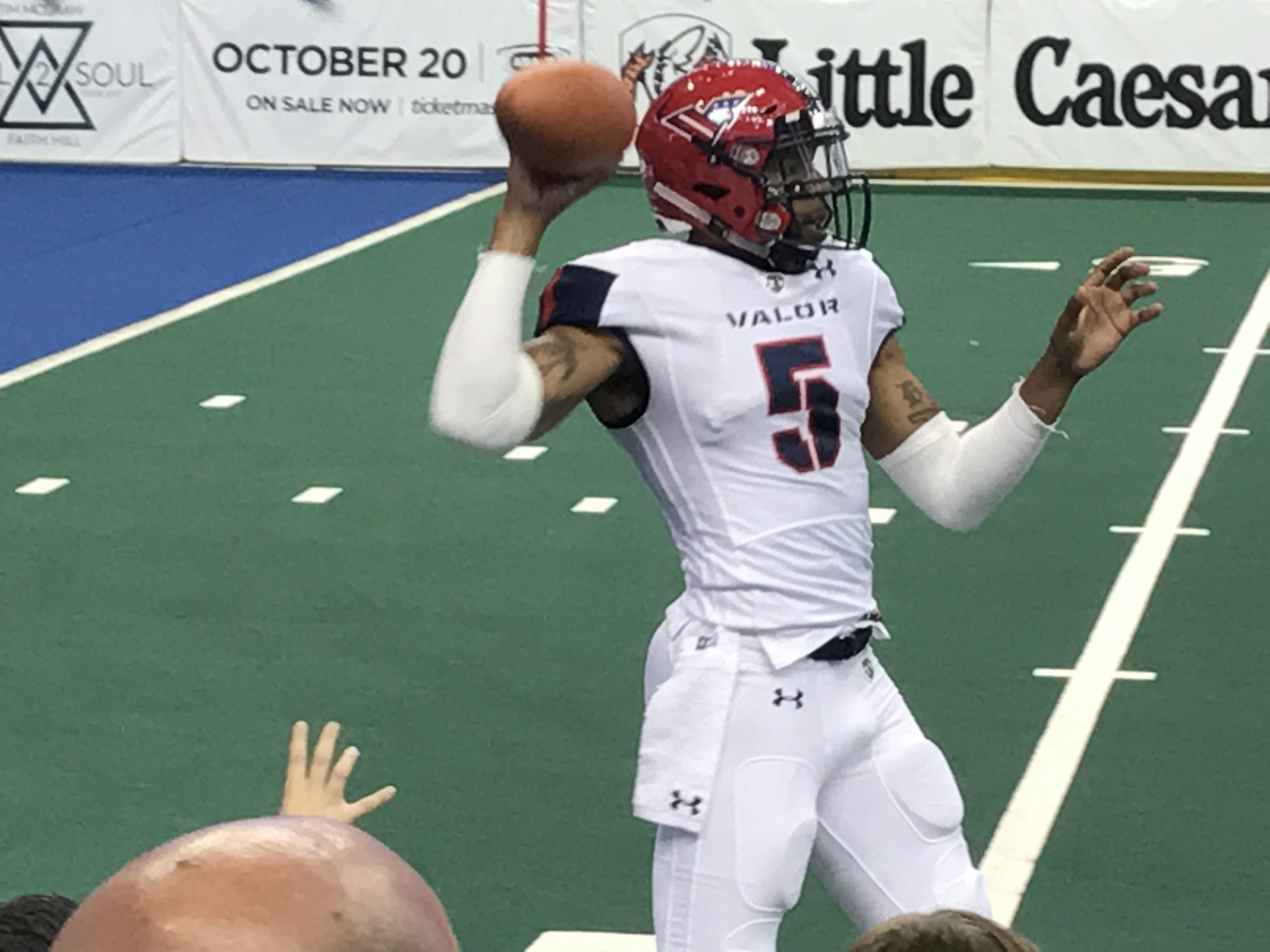
- Morris with the Washington Valor in 2017

No. 5, 1
- Position: Quarterback

Personal information
- Born: May 29, 1985 (age 41); Orlando, Florida, U.S.
- Listed height: 6 ft 4 in (1.93 m)
- Listed weight: 220 lb (100 kg)

Career information
- High school: Jones (Orlando)
- College: Marshall
- NFL draft: 2008: undrafted

Career history
- Arkansas Twisters (2009); Jacksonville Sharks (2010); Pittsburgh Power (2011); Jacksonville Sharks (2012–2013); Orlando Predators (2014–2016); Washington Valor (2017); Monterrey Steel (2017)

Career AFL statistics
- Comp. / Att.: 1,145 / 1,834
- Passing yards: 13,346
- TD–INT: 284–48
- QB rating: 112.24
- Rushing TD: 68
- Stats at ArenaFan.com

Bernard Raphael Morris (born May 29, 1985) is an American former professional football quarterback who played in the Arena Football League (AFL). He was signed as a street free agent by the Arkansas Twisters of the af2 in 2009. He played college football for the Marshall Thundering Herd.

== Early life ==
Morris was born on May 29, 1985, in Orlando, Florida, to Marcia Morris. He played high school football, basketball and baseball at Jones High School in Orlando. In basketball, he averaged nine points per game and 10 rebounds per game. While in football he ended up being named the offensive player of the year after throwing for 1,179 yards with 14 touchdowns in his senior year.

== College career ==
Morris played for the Marshall Thundering Herd from 2004 to 2008. He finished his college career with totals of 5,616 passing yards, 31 passing touchdowns, 28 interceptions, and 10 rushing touchdowns.

== Professional career ==
=== Pre-draft ===
Morris was rated the 12th best quarterback in the 2008 NFL draft by NFLDraftScout.com.

Pre-draft measurables
Height	Weight	40-yard dash	10-yard split	20-yard split	Vertical jump	Broad jump	Bench press
6 ft 3 in (1.91 m)	223 lb (101 kg)	4.68 s	1.68 s	2.81 s	24 1/2 in (0.62 m)	9 ft 1 in (2.77 m)	18 reps
All values from NFL Combine

=== Arkansas Twisters ===
Morris was assigned to the Arkansas Twisters on December 15, 2008, along with ex-Florida State quarterback, Xavier Lee. In the first round of the 2009 af2 season playoffs, Morris fumbled against the Boise Burn which was returned 32 yards for a touchdown. Arkansas ended up losing the game, 77–36.

=== Jacksonville Sharks ===
Following AF2's ceasing of operations in September 2009, Morris signed with the Jacksonville Sharks of Arena Football League (AFL) on January 6, 2010.

=== Pittsburgh Power ===
Bernard Morris signed with the expansion Pittsburgh Power of the AFL on September 27, 2010. He made his starting debut March 11, 2011, against the Philadelphia Soul. He was placed on injured reserve March 20 with a sore arm.

=== Jacksonville Sharks ===
On March 23, 2012, Morris re-signed with the Sharks for the 2012 AFL season.

=== Orlando Predators ===
On February 10, 2014, Morris was traded to the Orlando Predators along with Matt Marcorelle and Trevis Turner for Aaron Garcia. Morris announced his retirement on October 11, 2016.

=== Washington Valor ===
On October 14, 2016, Morris's rights were acquired by the Washington Valor during the dispersal draft. He was placed on refused to report on March 15, 2017, and activated from refused to report on March 21, 2017.

=== Monterrey Steel ===
Morris signed with the Monterrey Steel of the National Arena League on May 24, 2017. He played in 4 games for the Steel, completing 51 of 79 passes for 607 yards, 13 touchdowns, and 3 interceptions. He also rushed for 88 yards and 4 touchdowns.

== Career statistics ==
=== AFL ===
Year	Team	Passing							Rushing		
Year	Team	Cmp	Att	Pct	Yds	TD	Int	Rtg	Att	Yds	TD
2010	Jacksonville	51	83	61.4	567	8	0	105.85	32	97	6
2011	Pittsburgh	216	346	62.4	2,428	55	9	112.09	49	302	4
2012	Jacksonville	217	350	62.0	2,427	59	14	105.56	67	275	10
2013	Jacksonville	257	394	65.2	2,742	55	9	110.82	74	302	11
2014	Orlando	157	242	64.9	2,191	47	6	123.12	57	283	12
2015	Orlando	136	241	56.4	1,687	32	7	99.37	55	272	15
2016	Orlando	107	174	61.5	1,249	27	3	114.85	38	161	8
2017	Washington	4	4	100.0	55	1	0	158.33	6	13	2
Career		1,145	1,834	62.4	13,346	284	48	112.24	378	1,705	68

=== College ===
Marshall Thundering Herd
Season	Passing							Rushing			
Season	Comp	Att	Yards	Pct.	TD	Int	QB rating	Att	Yards	Avg	TD
2004	0	1	0	0.0	0	0	0.0	5	21	4.2	0
2005	114	216	1,121	52.8	6	6	100.0	75	256	3.4	4
2006	116	188	1,346	61.7	8	12	123.1	82	324	4.0	2
2007	253	398	3,149	63.6	17	10	139.1	130	488	3.8	4
Career	253	803	5,616	60.1	31	28	124.7	292	1,089	3.7	10
