= 2016 Jacksonville Sharks season =

Arena Football League team season

- Owner: Jeff Bouchy; Steve Curran; Diva Nagula, D.O. Kevin Wezniak; Rob Storm; Jason Green; Larry Payne
- General manager: Les Moss (fired week 16)
- Head coach: Les Moss (fired week 16; 5–9 record); Bob Landsee (interim) (2–0 record)
- Home stadium: Jacksonville Veterans Memorial Arena

Results
- Record: 7–9
- Conference place: 3rd American
- Playoffs: Won American Conference Semifinal 69-68 (Predators); Lost American Conference Championship 50-55 (Soul)

The 2016 Jacksonville Sharks season was the seventh season for the franchise in the Arena Football League (AFL). The team was coached by Les Moss for the first fourteen games of the season before he was fired and replaced by interim head coach Bob Landsee. The Sharks played their home games at the Jacksonville Veterans Memorial Arena.

== Standings ==
2016 American Conference standings
Team	Overall			Points			Records	
Team	W	L	PCT	PF	PA	CON	Home	Away
x-Philadelphia Soul	13	3	.813	983	776	5–1	7–1	6–2
Orlando Predators	12	4	.750	893	781	5–3	6–2	6–2
Jacksonville Sharks	7	9	.438	829	774	5–3	3–5	4–4
Tampa Bay Storm	2	14	.125	568	868	0–8	2–6	0–8

== Schedule ==
=== Regular season ===
The 2016 regular season schedule was released on December 10, 2015

Week	Day	Date	Kickoff	Opponent	Results		Location	Attendance	Report
Week	Day	Date	Kickoff	Opponent	Score	Record	Location	Attendance	Report
1	Saturday	April 2	9:00 p.m. EDT	at Los Angeles KISS	L 39–64	0–1	Honda Center	6,805	
2	Monday	April 11	7:00 p.m. EDT	at Philadelphia Soul	W 59–41	1–1	Wells Fargo Center	8,550	
3	Monday	April 18	7:00 p.m. EDT	Orlando Predators	L 56–63	1–2	Jacksonville Veterans Memorial Arena	7,835	
4	Saturday	April 23	7:00 p.m. EDT	Arizona Rattlers	L 68–75 (OT)	1–3	Jacksonville Veterans Memorial Arena	8,354	
5	Sunday	May 1	2:00 p.m. EDT	at Tampa Bay Storm	W 33–27	2–3	Amalie Arena	8,438	
6	Friday	May 6	7:00 p.m. EDT	at Cleveland Gladiators	L 40–41	2–4	Quicken Loans Arena	8,056	
7	Bye								
8	Saturday	May 21	7:30 p.m. EDT	Portland Steel	W 65–34	3–4	Jacksonville Veterans Memorial Arena	10,208	
9	Friday	May 27	7:30 p.m. EDT	at Orlando Predators	W 59–56	4–4	Amway Center	10,651	
10	Saturday	June 4	7:00 p.m. EDT	Philadelphia Soul	L 42–56	4–5	Jacksonville Veterans Memorial Arena	10,985	
11	Saturday	June 11	5:00 p.m. EDT	at Tampa Bay Storm	W 67–34	5–5	Amalie Arena	8,418	
12	Saturday	June 18	7:00 p.m. EDT	Orlando Predators	L 34–44	5–6	Jacksonville Veterans Memorial Arena	9,835	
13	Saturday	June 25	7:00 p.m. EDT	Cleveland Gladiators	L 47–48	5–7	Jacksonville Veterans Memorial Arena	10,645	
14	Bye								
15	Saturday	July 9	9:30 p.m. EDT	at Arizona Rattlers	L 67–69	5–8	Talking Stick Resort Arena	11,874	
16	Saturday	July 16	10:00 p.m. EDT	at Portland Steel	L 53–55	5–9	Moda Center	4,793	
17	Saturday	July 23	7:00 p.m. EDT	Los Angeles KISS	W 46–32	6–9	Jacksonville Veterans Memorial Arena	11,840	
18	Saturday	July 30	5:00 p.m. EDT	Tampa Bay Storm	W 54–35	7–9	Jacksonville Veterans Memorial Arena	10,324	

=== Playoffs ===
Round	Day	Date	Kickoff	Opponent	Results	Location	Attendance	Report
AC Semifinals	Saturday	August 6	7:00 p.m. EDT	at Orlando Predators	W 69–68 (OT)	Amway Center	12,171	
AC Championship	Sunday	August 14	6:00 p.m. EDT	at Philadelphia Soul	L 50–55	PPL Center	4,721	

== Roster ==
2016 Jacksonville Sharks roster
Quarterbacks: 10 Sean Brackett; 4 Tommy Grady; Fullbacks: 39 Derrick Ross; Wide receivers: 2 London Crawford; 1 Reggie Gray; 81 Joe Hills; 11 Anthony Jones; 82 Andrew Robustelli	Offensive linemen: 68 Ryan Cave; 72 Cornelius Lewis; 62 Raymond McNeil; 93 Moqut Ruffins; Defensive linemen: 33 Keith Bowers; 20 Antron Dillon; 69 Jordan Miller; 95 Geneath Moffett; 58 Khreem Smith	Linebackers: 17 Alvin Ray Jackson; 55 Dexter Jackson; Defensive backs: 3 David Hyland; 6 LaRoche Jackson; 9 Keon Lyn; 5 Micheaux Robinson; Kickers: 14 Lindsey Wolfe	Injured reserve: 12 Anthony Degrate DL; -- Chris Pickett DB; 21 Greg Reid DB; 42 Laith Wallchleger DL; Refused to report: -- R. J. Archer QB; -- Jeremy Gallon WR; -- Joe Sykes DL; Other league exempt: -- Martin Wright DL; Inactive reserve: 9 Roger Jackson WR; League suspension: -- A. C. Leonard WR; -- Cody Precht OL; Recallable reassignment: Currently vacant; Rookies in italics Roster updated August 10, 2016; 24 Active, 11 Inactive
