= Zach Anderson =

American gridiron football player (born 1989)

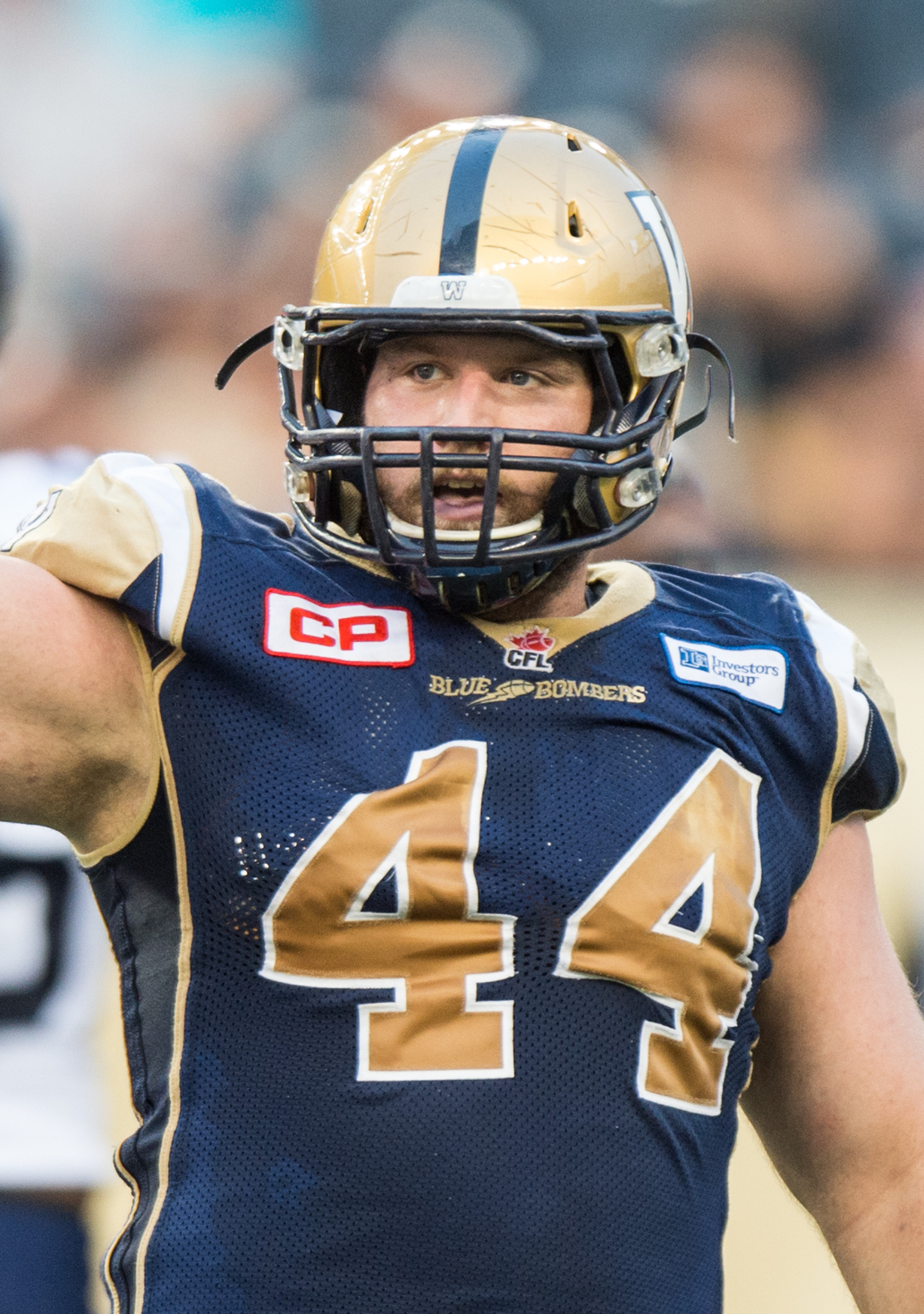
- Anderson with the Winnipeg Blue Bombers in 2015

No. 44
- Position: Defensive tackle

Personal information
- Born: November 20, 1989 (age 36); Sault Ste. Marie, Michigan
- Listed height: 6 ft 3 in (1.91 m)
- Listed weight: 295 lb (134 kg)

Career information
- High school: Sault (MI) Area
- College: Northern Michigan
- NFL draft: 2013: undrafted

Career history
- Winnipeg Blue Bombers (2013–2015); Orlando Predators (2016); Cleveland Gladiators (2017–2019)

Awards and highlights
- All-GLIAC second team (2010, 2011); All-GLIAC first team (2012)

Career CFL statistics as of 2014
- Tackles: 43
- Quarterback sacks: 10
- Stats at CFL.ca (archived)

Zach Anderson (born November 20, 1989) is an American former professional football defensive tackle. He played college football at Northern Michigan.

== College career ==
Anderson was named All-GLIAC first team in 2012.

== Professional career ==
Anderson attended the Cleveland Browns rookie camp after going undrafted in the 2013 NFL draft. In May 2013, Anderson signed with the Winnipeg Blue Bombers. On July 5, 2016, Anderson was assigned to the Orlando Predators. On October 14, 2016, Anderson was selected by the Cleveland Gladiators during the dispersal draft.
