= Jabin Sambrano =

American football player (born 1990)

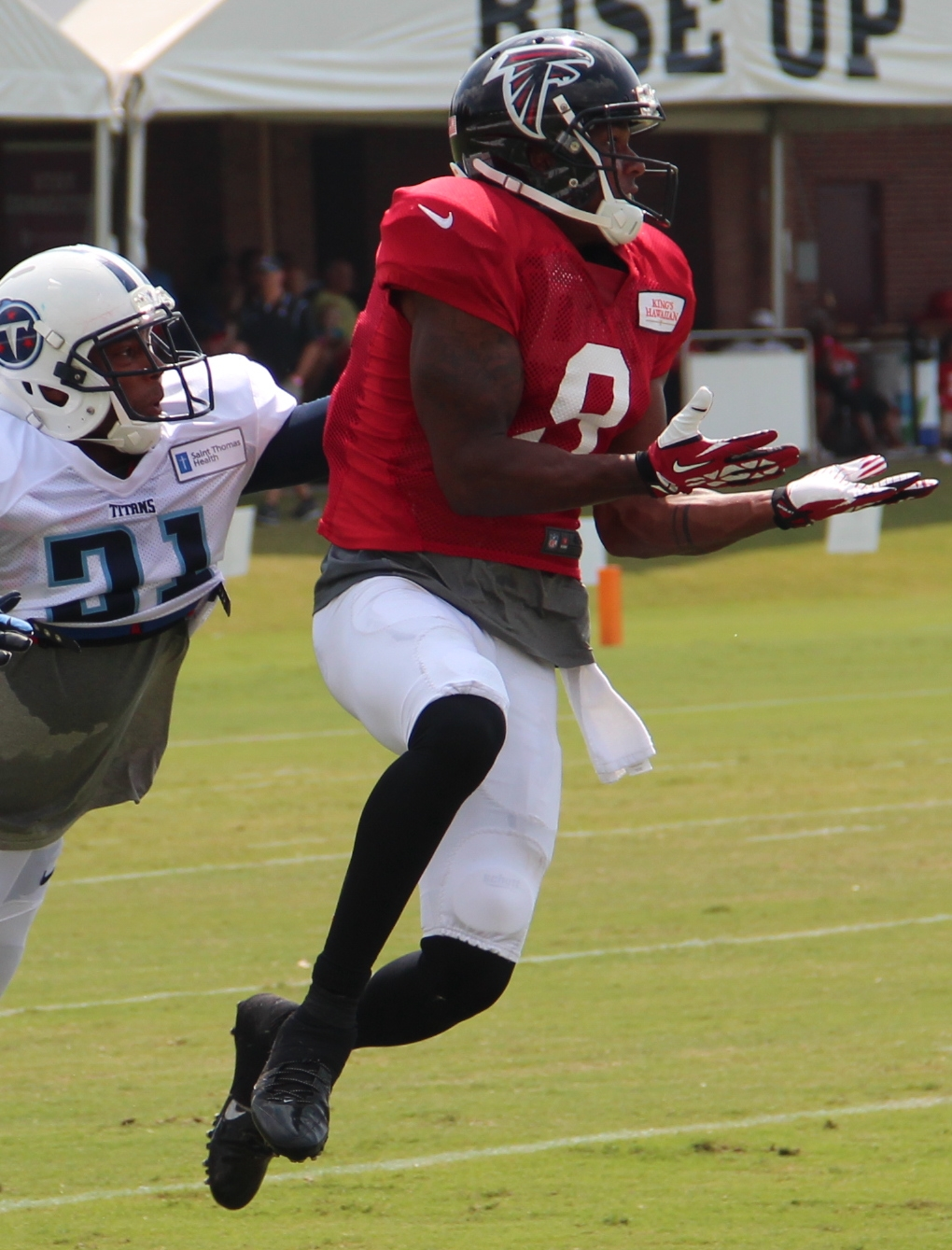
- Sambrano with the Falcons in 2014

No. 1, 2, 7
- Position: Wide receiver

Personal information
- Born: March 13, 1990 (age 36); Temecula, California
- Listed height: 5 ft 11 in (1.80 m)
- Listed weight: 175 lb (79 kg)

Career information
- High school: Temecula (CA) Great Oak
- College: Montana
- NFL draft: 2012: undrafted

Career history
- Indianapolis Colts (2012); Tampa Bay Buccaneers (2012)*; Indianapolis Colts (2013)*; Jacksonville Jaguars (2013–2014)*; BC Lions (2014)*; Atlanta Falcons (2014)*; Los Angeles KISS (2015); Spokane Shock (2015); Portland Steel (2016)
- * Offseason or practice squad member only

Awards and highlights
- Second-team All-Big Sky (2011)

Career AFL statistics
- Receptions: 62
- Receiving yards: 713
- Receiving TDs: 15
- Tackles: 8
- Stats at ArenaFan.com
- Stats at Pro Football Reference

Jabin Sambrano (born March 13, 1990) is an American former football wide receiver.

== College career ==
He played college football at Montana. As a senior for the Griz, Sambrano not only caught 36 passes for 632 yards and 10 scores, but also returned a punt for another score and a kickoff 96 yards for a touchdown.

== Pro football ==
He was signed by the Indianapolis Colts as an undrafted rookie free agent on April 30, 2012. He was signed to the Tampa Bay Buccaneers active roster on December 19, 2012. On December 23, 2013, he was signed the Jacksonville Jaguars' practice squad. He was signed to the team's active roster at the conclusion of the 2013 regular season.

On March 5, 2015, Sambrano was assigned to the Los Angeles KISS. On May 20, 2015, Sambrano was traded to the Spokane Shock to complete the trade of Danny Southwick to the KISS. On October 16, 2015, Sambrano was assigned to the Portland Thunder.
