= Trevis Turner =

American football player (born 1987)

No. 56, 76, 78, 64
- Position: Offensive lineman

Personal information
- Born: May 2, 1987 (age 39)
- Listed height: 6 ft 8 in (2.03 m)
- Listed weight: 330 lb (150 kg)

Career information
- High school: DeSoto (TX)
- College: Abilene Christian
- NFL draft: 2011: undrafted

Career history
- Pittsburgh Steelers (2011–2012)*; Orlando Predators (2012)*; Jacksonville Sharks (2013); Orlando Predators (2014)*; Edmonton Eskimos (2014); Nebraska Danger (2014–2016); Billings Wolves (2016); Nebraska Danger (2016); Texas Revolution (2017)*; Bloomington Edge (2017)
- * Offseason or practice squad member only

Awards and highlights
- First-team All-IFL (2015); First-team All-LSC (2010); Second-team All-LSC (2008)

Career AFL statistics
- Total tackles: 0.5
- Stats at ArenaFan.com
- Stats at Pro Football Reference

Trevis Turner (born May 2, 1987) is an American former football offensive lineman. He played college football for Abilene Christian University.

== College career ==
Turner originally signed with Colorado State University out of high school, but choose not to enroll at the school and attended Trinity Valley Community College. Turner started for one season with the Cardinals, before transferring to Northeastern State University, where he didn't not play for the RiverHawks. Prior to the 2008 season, Turner transferred to Abilene Christian University. As a sophomore in 2008, Turner was named Second Team All-Lone Star Conference South Division as an offensive tackle. As a senior in 2010, Turner was named First Team All-LSC and was named a finalist for the Gene Upshaw Award. He was also named a Division II All-American

== Professional career ==
=== Pittsburgh Steelers ===
Turner signed as an undrafted free agent with the Pittsburgh Steelers of the National Football League in 2011. Turner spent the entire season as a member of the Steelers practice squad. Turner was released in May 2012, after it was announced that he would be suspended the first four games of the 2012 season.

=== Nebraska Danger ===
On December 9, 2013, Turner signed with the Nebraska Danger of the Indoor Football League, where he then signed and played in the Canadian Football League (CFL) for the Edmonton Eskimos for a season . In 2015, Turner was named a First Team All-IFL selection.

=== Return to Orlando ===
On February 8, 2014, Turner was traded back to Orlando with Bernard Morris, Matt Marcorelle in exchange for Aaron Garcia. However, Turner had refused to report the entire 2014 season, and remained with the Danger.

=== Billings Wolves ===
On March 23, 2016, Turner signed with the Billings Wolves. He was released on April 22, 2016.

=== Return to Nebraska Danger ===
On May 19, 2016, Turner returned to the Nebraska Danger.

=== Texas Revolution ===
Tuner signed with the Texas Revolution for the 2017 season. He was released on February 20, 2017.

=== Bloomington Edge ===
On June 1, 2017, Turner signed with the Bloomington Edge.

=== Death ===
As of December 14th, 2025 Trevis Turner has deceased
