= 2016 Los Angeles Kiss season =

Arena football season

- Owner: Gene Simmons; Paul Stanley; Doc McGhee; Brett Bouchy
- Head coach: Omarr Smith
- Home stadium: Honda Center

Results
- Record: 7–9
- Conference place: 2nd National
- Playoffs: Lost National Conference Semifinals 52-56 (Gladiators)

The 2016 Los Angeles Kiss season was the third and final season for the arena football franchise in the Arena Football League. The team was coached by Omarr Smith and played their home games at Honda Center.

== Standings ==
2016 National Conference standings
Team	Overall			Points			Record	
Team	W	L	PCT	PF	PA	CON	Home	Away
x-Arizona Rattlers	13	3	.813	1,068	766	8–0	8–0	5–3
Los Angeles Kiss	7	9	.438	736	748	4–4	5–4	2–5
Cleveland Gladiators	7	9	.438	826	934	2–4	4–4	3–5
Portland Steel	3	13	.188	670	926	1–7	3–4	0–9

== Schedule ==
=== Regular season ===
The 2016 regular season schedule was released on December 10, 2015.

Week	Day	Date	Kickoff	Opponent	Results		Location	Attendance	Report
Week	Day	Date	Kickoff	Opponent	Score	Record	Location	Attendance	Report
1	Saturday	April 2	9:00 p.m. EDT	Jacksonville Sharks	W 64–39	1–0	Honda Center	6,805	
2	Saturday	April 9	11:00 p.m. EDT	Arizona Rattlers	L 28–69	1–1	Honda Center	6,427	
3	Saturday	April 16	7:30 p.m. EDT	at Cleveland Gladiators	W 47–42	2–1	Quicken Loans Arena	12,243	
4	Saturday	April 23	7:30 p.m. EDT	at Orlando Predators	L 40–43	2–2	Amway Center	10,127	
5	Monday	May 2	10:00 p.m. EDT	Philadelphia Soul	L 33–56	2–3	Honda Center	6,193	
6	Monday	May 9	10:00 p.m. EDT	Portland Steel	W 66–27	3–3	Honda Center	9,235	
7	Bye								
8	Saturday	May 21	9:00 p.m. EDT	at Arizona Rattlers	L 34–47	3–4	Talking Stick Resort Arena	14,519	
9	Saturday	May 28	10:00 p.m. EDT	Portland Steel	W 54–42	4–4	Honda Center	7,150	
10	Sunday	June 5	6:00 p.m. EDT	Orlando Predators	L 43–41	4–5	Honda Center	6,287	
11	Saturday	June 11	3:00 p.m. EDT	at Philadelphia Soul	L 37–73	4–6	Wells Fargo Center	5,802	
12	Saturday	June 18	7:30 p.m. EDT	at Tampa Bay Storm	W 57–27	5–6	Amalie Arena	9,670	
13	Sunday	June 26	6:00 p.m. EDT	Arizona Rattlers	L 49–64	5–7	Honda Center	7,090	
14	Bye								
15	Monday	July 11	10:00 p.m. EDT	Tampa Bay Storm	W 48–21	6–7	Honda Center	6,249	
16	Saturday	July 16	10:00 p.m. EDT	Cleveland Gladiators	W 63–61	7–7	Honda Center	8,069	
17	Saturday	July 24	7:30 p.m. EDT	at Jacksonville Sharks	L 32–46	7–8	Jacksonville Veterans Memorial Arena	11,840	
18	Monday	August 1	10:00 p.m. EDT	at Portland Steel	L 46–48	7–9	Moda Center	5,236	

=== Playoffs ===
Round	Day	Date	Kickoff	Opponent	Results	Location	Attendance	Report
NC Semifinals	Sunday	August 7	6:00 p.m. EDT	Cleveland Gladiators	L 52–56	Valley View Casino Center	4,269	

== Roster ==
2016 Los Angeles Kiss roster
Quarterbacks: 10 Nathan Stanley; 16 Pete Thomas; Fullbacks: 34 Rory Nixon; Wide receivers: -- Diondre Borel; 1 Donovan Morgan; 4 D. J. Stephens; 11 Fred Williams; 18 LaQuan Williams; 15 Justin Wilson	Offensive linemen: 54 Kody Afusia; 77 Ian Joseph; 70 Colin Madison; 64 Sam Tupua; Defensive linemen: 92 Gustave Benthin; 9 Dontay Moch; 55 Marcus Pittman; 85 Caesar Rayford; 71 Shannon Tevega	Linebackers: 56 Derrick Summers; Defensive backs: 20 Qumain Black; 3 Fred Obi; 2 Terrance Smith; 8 Clevan Thomas; 6 Josh Victorian; Kickers: 17 Donny Hageman; -- Garrett Lindholm	Injured reserve: -- Sherman Carter OL; 19 Joey Cejudo K; 5 Brandon Collins WR; -- Reggie Dunn WR; 11 Amarri Jackson WR; 7 Rayshaun Kizer DB; 53 Mike Lewis DL; 98 Kalafitoni Pole DL; 34 Laron Scott DB; 32 Winston Wright DB; Refuse to report: -- Matt Armstrong OL; -- Lowell Rose DB; Other league exempt: 74 Travis Bond OL; -- Kamar Jorden WR; -- Adrian McPherson QB; -- Kevin Smith WR; League suspension: -- Mister Alexander DL; -- Courtney Bridget OL; 14 Joe Clancy QB; 48 Andre Heidari K; -- Miles Mason OL; -- Cordell Roberson WR; -- DeMarco Sampson WR; -- Zack Williams OL; 21 Mike Willie WR; Inactive reserve: 65 J. J. Unga OL; 23 Trey Wolfe DB; Recallable reassignment: 19 Chris Gould K; Rookies in italics Roster updated August 6, 2016; 26 Active, 28 Inactive

== Staff ==
Los Angeles Kiss staff
Front office: Co-owner – Gene Simmons; Co-owner – Paul Stanley; Co-owner – Doc McGhee; President/CEO – Joe Windham; General manager – Vacant; Director of player personnel – Daniel Frazer; Director of scouting – Grady Tucker, Jr.	Head coach: Head coach – Omarr Smith; Offensive coaches: Wide receivers – Russell Shaw; Defensive coaches: Defensive coordinator – Walt Housman; Defensive lineman – Grady Tucker, Jr.	Sports Medicine: Head athletic trainer – Bruno F. Silva; Team physician – Dr. Luga Podesta; Team physician – Dr. Michale Banffy; Team internist – Dr. Dennis Jordanides; Team neurologist – Dr. Vernon Williams
