= Larry Beavers =

American gridiron football player (born 1985)

No. 8, 88, 10, 27, 6
- Positions: Wide receiver, kick returner

Personal information
- Born: October 7, 1985 (age 41)
- Listed height: 5 ft 10 in (1.78 m)
- Listed weight: 186 lb (84 kg)

Career information
- High school: Annapolis (Annapolis, Maryland)
- College: Wesley (DE)
- NFL draft: 2009: undrafted

Career history
- Carolina Panthers (2009)*; New Orleans Saints (2010)*; Iowa Barnstormers (2011); Edmonton Eskimos (2011)*; Pittsburgh Power (2012)*; New Orleans VooDoo (2013–2015); Las Vegas Outlaws (2015); Cleveland Gladiators (2016–2017); Philadelphia Soul (2017); Georgia Doom (2018); Albany Empire (2018); West Virginia Roughriders (2019–2020); Jersey Flight (2021); Orlando Predators (2022); Fayetteville Mustangs (2023); Iowa Rampage (2024); Kansas City Goats (2024)
- * Offseason or practice squad member only

Awards and highlights
- ArenaBowl champion (2017); 2× Second-team All-Arena (2014, 2016)

Career AFL statistics
- Receptions: 165
- Yards: 2,189
- Receiving TDs: 28
- Kick return yards: 4,116
- Kick Return TDs: 8
- Stats at ArenaFan.com

Larry Beavers (born October 7, 1985) is an American former professional football wide receiver and kick returner.

== Early life ==
Beavers attended Annapolis High School where he played three sports: football, baseball and track.

== College career ==
He attended Wesley College a Division III school located in Dover, Delaware. He currently holds the NCAA all-divisions record for kick return touchdowns with 10. He ended his college career with 2,366 receiving yards, becoming the second all-time in college history.

== Professional career ==
=== Carolina Panthers ===
After college, Beavers entered the National Football League (NFL) as an undrafted free agent for the Carolina Panthers on May 1, 2009. He was waived by the team at the end of preseason on September 5, 2009.

=== New Orleans Saints ===
On May 13, 2010, Beavers was signed by the New Orleans Saints. The activation of Robert Meachem from the physically unable to perform list resulted in Beavers being cut from the team.

=== Iowa Barnstormers ===
In 2011, he was signed by the Iowa Barnstormers of the Arena Football League (AFL).

=== Edmonton Eskimos ===
On June 17, 2011, Beavers was signed by the Edmonton Eskimos of the Canadian Football League (CFL). He was released on June 25, 2011, before the start of the regular season.

=== New Orleans VooDoo ===
In 2013, Beavers was assigned to the New Orleans VooDoo. He was waived by the team on July 3, 2013, only to be reassigned to the VooDoo on July 4, 2013. He was placed on reassignment on June 25, 2015.

=== Las Vegas Outlaws ===
On August 6, 2015, Beavers was assigned to the Las Vegas Outlaws.

=== Cleveland Gladiators ===
On December 14, 2015, Beavers was assigned to the Cleveland Gladiators. He was placed on reassignment by the team on January 11, 2017. On June 1, 2017, Beavers was assigned to the Gladiators. On June 5, 2017, Beavers was placed on reassignment.

=== Philadelphia Soul ===
On June 13, 2017, Beavers was assigned to the Philadelphia Soul of the Arena Football League (AFL). On August 26, 2017, the Soul beat the Tampa Bay Storm in ArenaBowl XXX by a score of 44–40.

=== Georgia Doom ===
In January 2018, Beavers signed with the Georgia Doom of the American Arena League (AAL).

=== Albany Empire ===
On May 31, 2018, Beavers was assigned to the Albany Empire of the Arena Football League (AFL). On July 2, 2018, he was placed on reassignment.

=== West Virginia Roughriders ===
On October 31, 2018, Beavers signed with the West Virginia Roughriders of the American Arena League (AAL). On November 1, 2019, Beavers re-signed with the Roughriders for the 2020 season.

=== Jersey Flight ===
On November 2, 2020, Beavers signed with the Jersey Flight of the National Arena League (NAL).

=== Orlando Predators ===
On November 26, 2021, Beavers signed with the Orlando Predators of the National Arena League (NAL). On October 31, 2022, Beavers re-signed with the Predators for the 2023 season. On March 29, 2023, Beavers was released by the Predators.

=== AFL statistics ===
Legend
	Won the ArenaBowl
	Led the league
**Bold**	Career high

Year	Team	Receiving			Returns		
Year	Team	Rec	Yds	TD	Ret	Yds	TD
2011	Iowa	12	165	1	31	500	0
2013	New Orleans	13	176	2	11	234	1
2014	New Orleans	**80**	**1,020**	**16**	59	1,136	**4**
2015	New Orleans	10	125	1	23	534	2
2016	Cleveland	50	703	8	**91**	**1,494**	1
2017	Cleveland	0	0	0	5	101	0
2017	Philadelphia	0	0	0	7	117	0
Career		165	2,189	28	227	4,116	8
