= Brandon Tett =

American gridiron football player (born 1987)

Profile
- Position: Defensive lineman

Personal information
- Born: May 26, 1987 (age 39); Vancouver, Washington, United States
- Listed height: 6 ft 1 in (1.85 m)
- Listed weight: 260 lb (118 kg)

Career information
- High school: Gresham (OR) Sam Barlow
- College: Oregon
- NFL draft: 2010: undrafted

Career history
- Portland Thunder (2014–2015); Calgary Stampeders (2015); Orlando Predators (2016)

Career AFL statistics as of 2014
- Tackle: 12
- Sacks: 2.5
- Pass breakups: 1
- Fumble recoveries: 1
- Stats at ArenaFan.com

Brandon Lee Tett (born May 26, 1987) is a professional American football defensive linemen who is currently a free agent. He has also been a member of the Portland Thunder of the Arena Football League. He attended the University of Oregon and played for the school's football team. According to the AFL, Tett stands at 6 feet 1 inch (1.85 m) and weighs 260 pounds (120 kg).

== Early life ==
Tett was born in Vancouver, Washington, on May 26, 1987, and attended Sam Barlow High School in Gresham, Oregon. After graduation, he attended Arizona Western College in Yuma, Arizona, but later transferred to the University of Oregon in Eugene, Oregon. Tett was a walk-on for the Oregon Ducks football team in 2010. During Ducks training camp in 2010, Tett set a team bench press record of 540 pounds (240 kg). He surpassed the old record held by Igor Olshansky and Haloti Ngata who had both benched 505 pounds (229 kg).

== Professional career ==
=== Portland Thunder ===
The Portland Thunder, an expansion franchise in the Arena Football League (AFL), held open-tryouts on December 18, 2013, at the Moda Center. Out of nearly 200 players, Tett, Brandon Lockheart and Dustin Risseeuw were invited to training camp. By the start of the 2014 season, Tett had signed with the Thunder.

=== Calgary Stampeders ===
Though born in the U.S., Tett qualifies as a national in the Canadian Football League because his mother is a native of Courtenay, B.C., and he has held Canadian citizenship since he was six years old.

On July 7, 2015, the Stampeders selected Brandon in the CFL Supplemental Draft. By making the selection, the Stampeders forfeited their seventh-round pick in the 2016 regular draft.

On September 15, 2015, Tett was added to the Stampeders practice roster.

On July 28, 2016, Tett was assigned to the Orlando Predators.
