= Dominie Pittman =

American gridiron football player (born 1986)

No. 4, 55
- Position: Defensive lineman

Personal information
- Born: October 13, 1986 (age 40); Pensacola, Florida, U.S.
- Listed height: 6 ft 3 in (1.91 m)
- Listed weight: 239 lb (108 kg)

Career information
- College: North Alabama
- NFL draft: 2010: undrafted

Career history
- BC Lions (2010); Pittsburgh Power (2012–2013); Los Angeles Kiss (2014–2015); New Orleans VooDoo (2015); Tampa Bay Storm (2016)

Career AFL statistics
- Tackles: 89.5
- Sacks: 16.5
- Pass breakups: 5
- Forced fumbles: 1
- Blocked kicks: 5
- Stats at ArenaFan.com

Dominie Pittman (born October 13, 1986) is a former defensive end. He has also played for the BC Lions of the Canadian Football League (CFL). Pittman signed as a free agent with the Lions on April 22, 2010. He played college football for the North Alabama Lions.

On June 6, 2015, Pittman was traded by the Los Angeles KISS to the New Orleans VooDoo to complete the trade of Rayshaun Kizer.

On January 28, 2016, Pittman was assigned to the Tampa Bay Storm.
