= Tyrone Goard =

American gridiron football player (born 1990)

No. 12, 13, 17
- Position: Wide receiver

Personal information
- Born: April 30, 1990 (age 36); Charleston, West Virginia, U.S.
- Listed height: 6 ft 4 in (1.93 m)
- Listed weight: 192 lb (87 kg)

Career information
- High school: Capital (Charleston)
- College: Eastern Kentucky
- NFL draft: 2013: undrafted

Career history
- Cincinnati Bengals (2013)*; Pittsburgh Power (2014); Portland Thunder (2014); Pittsburgh Power (2014); Philadelphia Soul (2015)*; Winnipeg Blue Bombers (2015)*; Los Angeles KISS (2015–2016); Portland Steel (2016); Tampa Bay Storm (2017)*
- * Offseason or practice squad member only

Awards and highlights
- 2× Second-team All-OVC (2011−2012)

Career AFL statistics
- Receptions: 95
- Receiving Yards: 903
- Receiving TDs: 36
- Tackles: 20
- Stats at ArenaFan.com
- Stats at Pro Football Reference

Tyrone Goard (born April 30, 1990) is an American former football wide receiver. He was signed as an undrafted free agent by the Cincinnati Bengals in 2013. He played college football at Eastern Kentucky. He also spent time with the Pittsburgh Power, Portland Thunder, Philadelphia Soul, Winnipeg Blue Bombers, Los Angeles KISS, Portland Steel and Tampa Bay Storm.

== Early life ==
He attended Capital High School in Charleston, West Virginia. He was selected to the second team all-state at the Division 3A level. He had 53 receptions for 879 receiving yards and nine receiving touchdowns in his senior season of high school.

== College career ==
He played college football at Eastern Kentucky University. He was selected to the 2011 All-OVC second team.

== Professional career ==
Pre-draft measurables
Height	Weight	Arm length	Hand span	40-yard dash	10-yard split	20-yard shuttle	Three-cone drill	Vertical jump	Broad jump	Bench press
6 ft 4 in (1.93 m)	205 lb (93 kg)	34 in (0.86 m)	8 3/4 in (0.22 m)	4.44 s	1.53 s	4.39 s	6.90 s	38.0 in (0.97 m)	123 ft 0 in (37.49 m)	10 reps
All values from the NFL Combine

On April 27, 2013, he signed with the Cincinnati Bengals as an undrafted free agent following the 2013 NFL draft. On August 18, 2013, he was released by the Bengals.

On October 12, 2013, Goard was assigned to the Pittsburgh Power of the Arena Football League (AFL). Goard made his Arena Football League debut against the Cleveland Gladiators on March 15, 2014.

On March 26, 2014, Goard was traded to the Portland Thunder in exchange for offensive lineman Antonio Narcisse. Goard did not appear in any games with the Thunder.

On April 3, 2014, Goard was traded back to the Power in exchange for wide receiver Alvance Robinson. On April 11, Goard caught 2 passes for 15 yards and 2 touchdowns against the New Orleans VooDoo. Goard played extremely well upon his return to the Power, catching 29 passes for 306 yards and 18 touchdowns in only 7 games. Goard was placed on injured reserve for the team's final 5 regular season games but was activated on July 31, three days before the Power's playoff game against the Orlando Predators. The Power folded after the 2014 season.

On December 29, 2014, Goard was assigned to the Philadelphia Soul.

After one season in the AFL, Goard signed with the Winnipeg Blue Bombers of the Canadian Football League on February 23, 2015. On May 15, 2015, Goard was released.

On June 5, 2015, the Soul traded Goard to the Los Angeles KISS for future considerations. On November 20, 2015, Goard was assigned to the KISS. On March 26, 2016, Goard was placed on recallable reassignment.

On April 13, 2016, Goard was assigned to the Portland Steel.

Goard was assigned to the Tampa Bay Storm on February 15, 2017. He was placed on On injury reserved by the Storm on March 20, 2017.
