= Randy Colling =

American-Canadian football player (born 1990)

No. 96
- Position: Defensive lineman

Personal information
- Born: May 10, 1990 (age 36); Arcade, New York, U.S.
- Listed height: 6 ft 5 in (1.96 m)
- Listed weight: 320 lb (145 kg)

Career information
- High school: Pioneer (Yorkshire, New York)
- College: Gannon (2008–2011)
- NFL draft: 2012: undrafted
- CFL draft: 2017: 1st round, 6th overall pick

Career history
- Cleveland Gladiators (2013–2016); Buffalo Bills (2014)*; Calgary Stampeders (2017)
- * Offseason or practice squad member only

Awards and highlights
- First-team All-Arena (2016); First-team All-American (2011); 3× First-team All-PSAC (2009–2011)
- Stats at Pro Football Reference
- Stats at CFL.ca
- Stats at ArenaFan.com

Randy Colling (born May 10, 1990) is an American-Canadian former professional football defensive lineman who played in the Arena Football League (AFL) and Canadian Football League (CFL). He played college football for the Gannon Golden Knights.

== Early life ==
Randy Colling was born on May 10, 1990, in Arcade, New York. He attended Pioneer High School in Yorkshire, New York. While there, he played high school football.

== College career ==
Colling was a member of the Gannon Golden Knights football team from 2008 to 2011. As a senior in 2011, he posted 39 solo tackles, 49 assisted tackles, and nine sacks. For his performance during the 2011 season, he was named a first-team All-American by D2football.com and Beyond College Sports Network, a second-team All-American by the Associated Press, Daktronics, and D2ProDay.com, and an honorable mention All-American by Don Hansen's Football Gazette. Colling played in 43 games overall during his college career, totaling 101 solo tackles, 119 assisted tackles, and 25 sacks. His 25 sacks were the second most in school history. He also earned first-team All-Pennsylvania State Athletic Conference honors each year from 2009 to 2011. Colling majored in criminal justice at Gannon. He was inducted into Gannon's athletics hall of fame in 2024.

== Professional career ==
After going undrafted in the 2012 NFL draft, Colling attended rookie minicamp on a tryout basis with both the New York Jets and New York Giants.

On November 7, 2012, Colling was assigned to the Cleveland Gladiators of the Arena Football League (AFL). He played for the Gladiators from 2013 to 2016, recording AFL career totals of 49 solo tackles, 46 assisted tackles, 13.5 sacks, five forced fumbles, and four fumble recoveries. He garnered first-team All-Arena recognition in 2016 at nose guard. Colling also played in ArenaBowl XXVII in 2014.

Colling signed a futures contract with the Buffalo Bills on January 14, 2014. The Bills attempted to convert him to offensive guard. He was later released on May 29, 2014, after the second day of offseason practices.

Colling was selected by the Calgary Stampeders of the Canadian Football League (CFL) in the first round, with the sixth overall pick, of the 2017 CFL draft. He had recently acquired Canadian citizenship due to his father having been born in Hamilton, Ontario. He dressed in five games overall for the Stampeders during the 2017 CFL season as a defensive tackle, and posted five tackles on defense. Colling had multiple stints on the injured list. He also dressed for the West Division final and the 105th Grey Cup. He was released on June 10, 2018.

== Coaching career ==
Colling later returned to his alma mater, Pioneer High School, as a wrestling and football coach.
