= Joe Madsen =

American football player (born 1989)

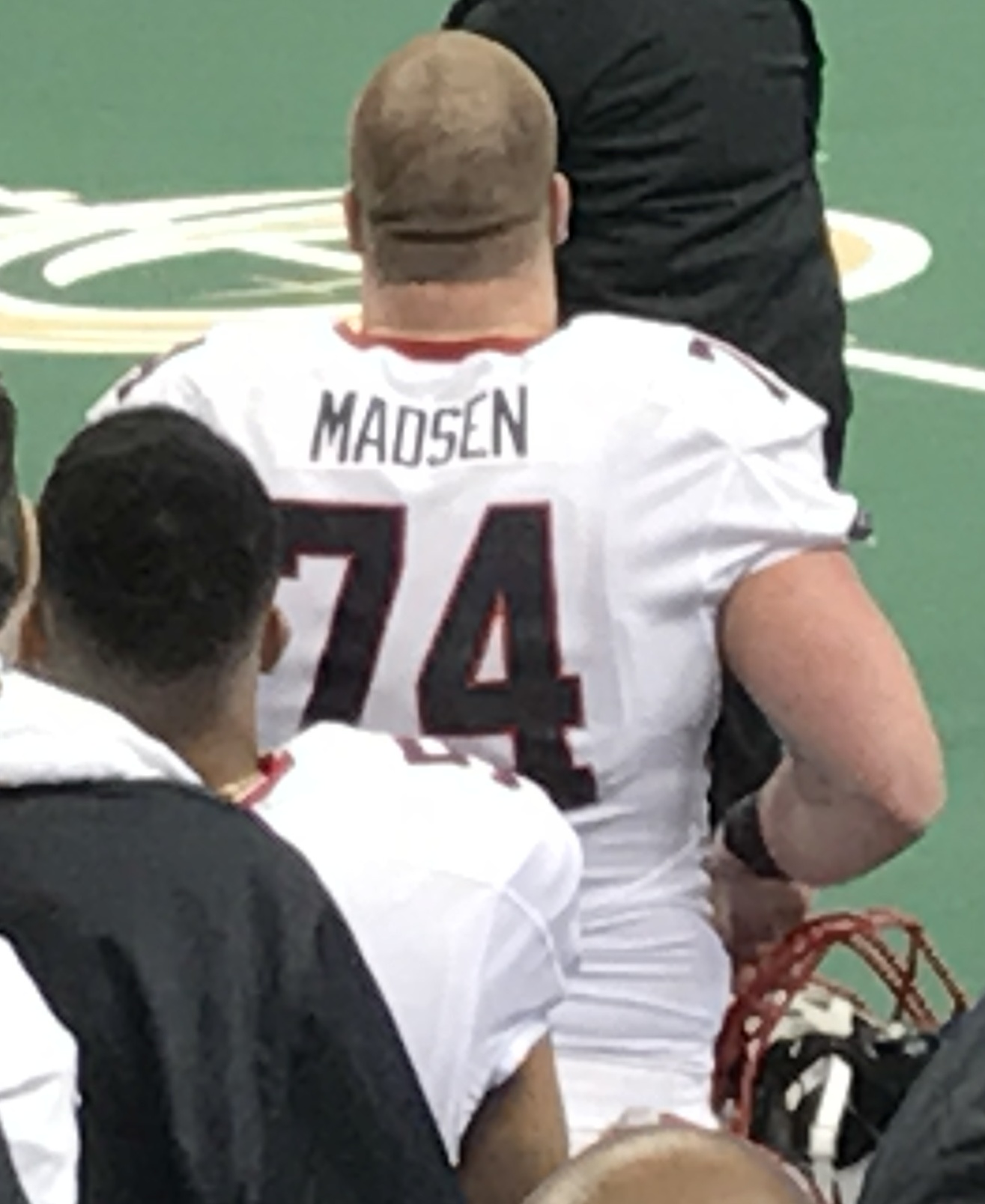
- Madsen (74) in 2017

No. 74
- Position: Offensive lineman

Personal information
- Born: September 1, 1989 (age 37); Chardon, Ohio, U.S.
- Listed height: 6 ft 3 in (1.91 m)
- Listed weight: 315 lb (143 kg)

Career information
- High school: Chardon (Chardon, Ohio)
- College: West Virginia
- NFL draft: 2013: undrafted

Career history
- Pittsburgh Steelers (2013)*; LA Kiss (2014–2015); Green Bay Packers (2015)*; Cleveland Browns (2015)*; Detroit Lions (2015)*; Cleveland Gladiators (2016–2017); Washington Valor (2017)*
- * Offseason or practice squad member only

Awards and highlights
- Second-team All-Big East (2011); Second-team All-Big XII (2012); First-team All-Arena (2016)

Career AFL statistics
- Tackles: 4
- Receptions: 1
- Rec. yards: 8
- Stats at ArenaFan.com
- Stats at Pro Football Reference

Joseph Madsen (born September 1, 1989) is an American former arena football offensive lineman. He played college football at West Virginia. He was originally signed by the Pittsburgh Steelers as an undrafted free agent.

== Early life ==
Madsen attended Chardon High School where he played both offensive tackle and defensive tackle. While at Chardon he recorded 59 total tackles, five sacks, 18 tackles-for-loss and forced four fumbles. During his sophomore season, Chardon reached the Ohio Regional Finals where they lost to Nordonia. As a senior, he was selected First-team All-Ohio as an offensive tackle.

== College career ==
Madsen attended West Virginia. While there he started 50 games and earned Second-team-All Big XII as a senior and appeared in the 2013 Senior Bowl.

He redshirt as a true freshman in 2008. In 2009, he started 13 games and 12 in 2010. In 2011, he started 13 games and was named All-Big East Second-team. As a senior, in 2012, he started 12 games, however, he was ruled academically ineligible for the Pinstripe Bowl. He was also named All-Big XII Second-team.

== Professional career ==
=== Pre-draft ===
Pre-draft measurables
Height	Weight	Arm length	Hand span	40-yard dash	10-yard split	20-yard split	20-yard shuttle	Three-cone drill	Vertical jump	Broad jump	Bench press
6 ft 3 in (1.91 m)	310 lb (141 kg)	30 in (0.76 m)	9 1/2 in (0.24 m)	5.20 s	-- s	-- s	4.83 s	-- s	25 in (0.64 m)	8 ft 2 in (2.49 m)	25 reps
All values from NFL Combine

At the West Virginia Pro Day, Madsen chose not to re-attempt his 40-yard dash. However, he did re-attempt some other drills. He recorded a 27-inch vertical leap and an 8-foot-10 broad jump. In the running drills, Madsen ran a 4.86 short shuttle and a 7.58 second three-cone shuttle.

=== National Football League ===
On April 27, 2013, after going undrafted, Madsen was signed by the Pittsburgh Steelers.

On January 3, 2015, Madsen was signed by the Green Bay Packers to their practice squad. On May 4, he was released by the Packers. On June 22, he was signed by the Cleveland Browns. He was signed when Tyler Loos informed the team he was retiring. He was released on August 16. On August 26, he was then signed by the Detroit Lions. He was released on September 5, 2015.

=== Arena Football League ===
After being released by the Steelers on August 31, 2013, he joined the Los Angeles Kiss for the 2014 season. For the season he appeared in 16 games and recorded one tackle as well as one reception for eight yards. He started the 2015 season, however, he was signed by the Browns and was placed on the other league exempt list.

He became an AFL free agent on November 5. Later that month, he joined the Cleveland Gladiators. On May 22, 2017, Madsen was placed on reassignment by the Gladiators.

On May 23, 2017, Madsen was claimed off waivers by the Washington Valor. On July 15, 2017, Madsen was placed on reassignment.

== Personal life ==
Madsen was born to Eric and Reta Madsen. He has three older siblings.

Madsen currently resides in Twinsburg, Ohio.
