= Damien Borel =

American football player (born 1993)

Profile
- Position: Defensive lineman

Personal information
- Born: June 1, 1993 (age 33); Pasadena, California, U.S.
- Listed height: 6 ft 4 in (1.93 m)
- Listed weight: 270 lb (122 kg)

Career information
- High school: Woodland (Woodland, California)
- College: Butte Community College
- NFL draft: 2015: undrafted

Career history
- San Jose SaberCats (2015); Arizona Rattlers (2016); Baltimore Brigade (2018)

Awards and highlights
- ArenaBowl champion (2015); First-team All-Arena (2016)

Career AFL statistics
- Tackles: 30.5
- Sacks: 8.5
- Forced Fumbles: 1
- Fumble recoveries: 2
- INTs: 0
- Stats at ArenaFan.com

Damien Borel (born June 1, 1993) is an American former football defensive lineman. He attended (and played football at) Woodland High School and Butte College. In 2012, while at Butte, he tallied 69 tackles and 19 sacks. Borel's 19 sacks led all California Community College Athletic Association players in 2012.

Borel was assigned to the San Jose SaberCats of the Arena Football League on May 15, 2015. As a rookie, Borel recorded seven tackles and two sacks in limited playing time. He won his first AFL Championship when the SaberCats defeated the Jacksonville Sharks in ArenaBowl XXVIII at the end of the season.

On December 9, 2015, Borel was assigned to the Arizona Rattlers. On April 26, 2018, he was assigned to the Baltimore Brigade.
