= Mykel Benson =

American football player (born 1987)

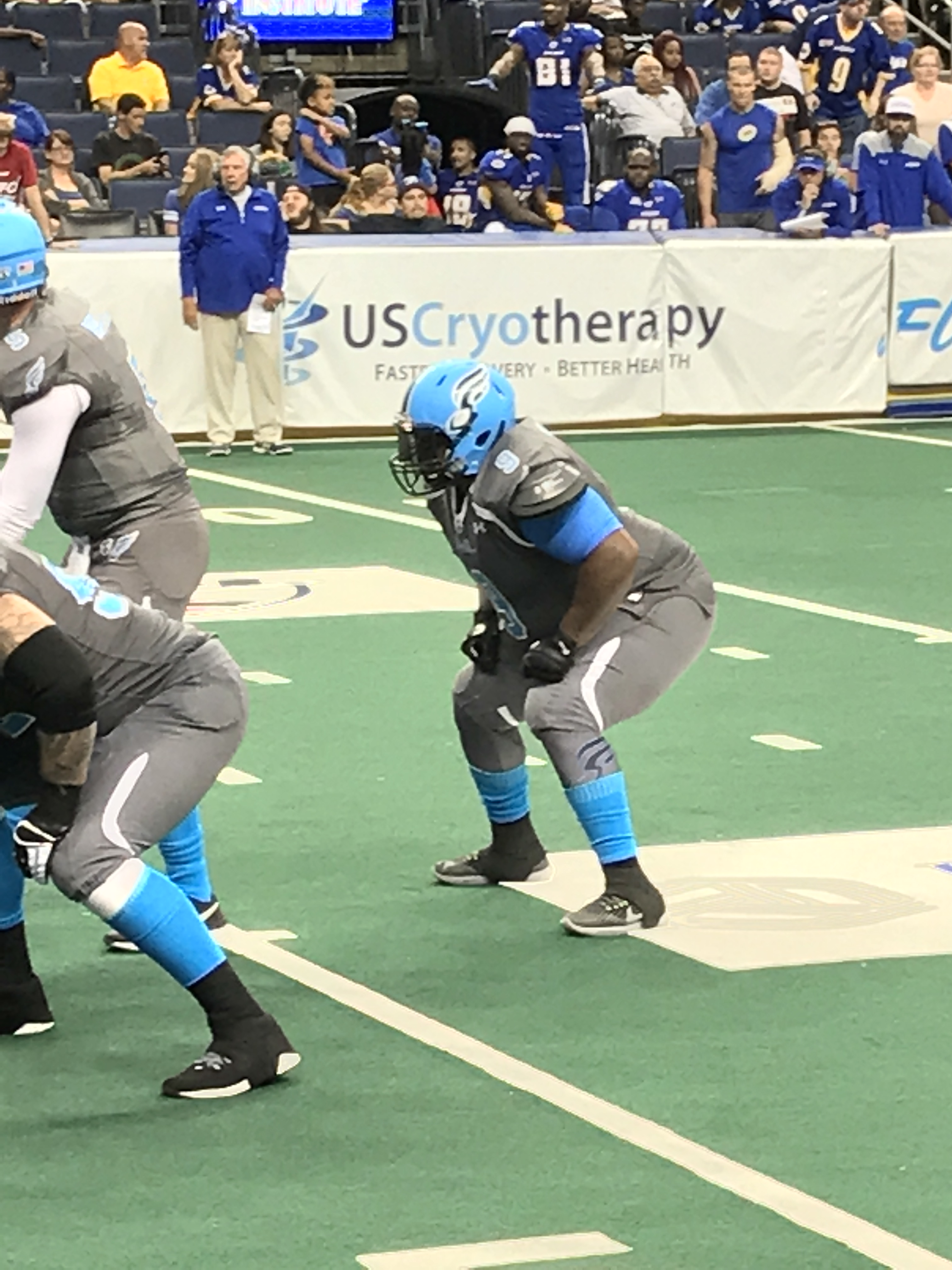
- Benson with the Philadelphia Soul in 2017

No. 9, 22, 43
- Position: Fullback

Personal information
- Born: December 30, 1987 (age 38)
- Listed height: 6 ft 0 in (1.83 m)
- Listed weight: 275 lb (125 kg)

Career information
- High school: Palm Bay (FL) Bayside
- College: Florida A&M
- NFL draft: 2010: undrafted

Career history
- Milwaukee Mustangs (2011); Georgia Force (2012); Orlando Predators (2012–2013); San Antonio Talons (2014); Arizona Rattlers (2015–2016); Philadelphia Soul (2017); Baltimore Brigade (2018); Albany Empire (2018–2019)

Awards and highlights
- 2× ArenaBowl champion (2017, 2019); 3× First-team All-Arena (2016, 2017, 2019); Second-team All-Arena (2014)

Career AFL statistics
- Carries: 642
- Rushing yards: 1,765
- Rushing TDs: 123
- Receiving yards: 891
- Receiving TDs: 25
- Stats at ArenaFan.com

Mykel “Boom Boom” Benson (born December 30, 1987) is an American former professional football fullback who played in the Arena Football League (AFL). He was signed by the Milwaukee Mustangs as an undrafted free agent in 2011. He played college football and college baseball at Florida A&M University.

Benson was assigned to the Philadelphia Soul on January 13, 2017. He was placed on recallable reassignment on April 1, 2017. He was activated April 5, 2017. He earned first-team All-Arena honors in 2017. On August 26, 2017, the Soul beat the Tampa Bay Storm in ArenaBowl XXX by a score of 44–40.

On April 17, 2018, he was assigned to the Baltimore Brigade. On June 14, 2018, he was placed on reassignment. The next day, he was claimed off reassignment by the Albany Empire. Benson was named to his third All-Arena team in 2019, en route to winning his second championship with Albany that same year.
