= Collin Taylor =

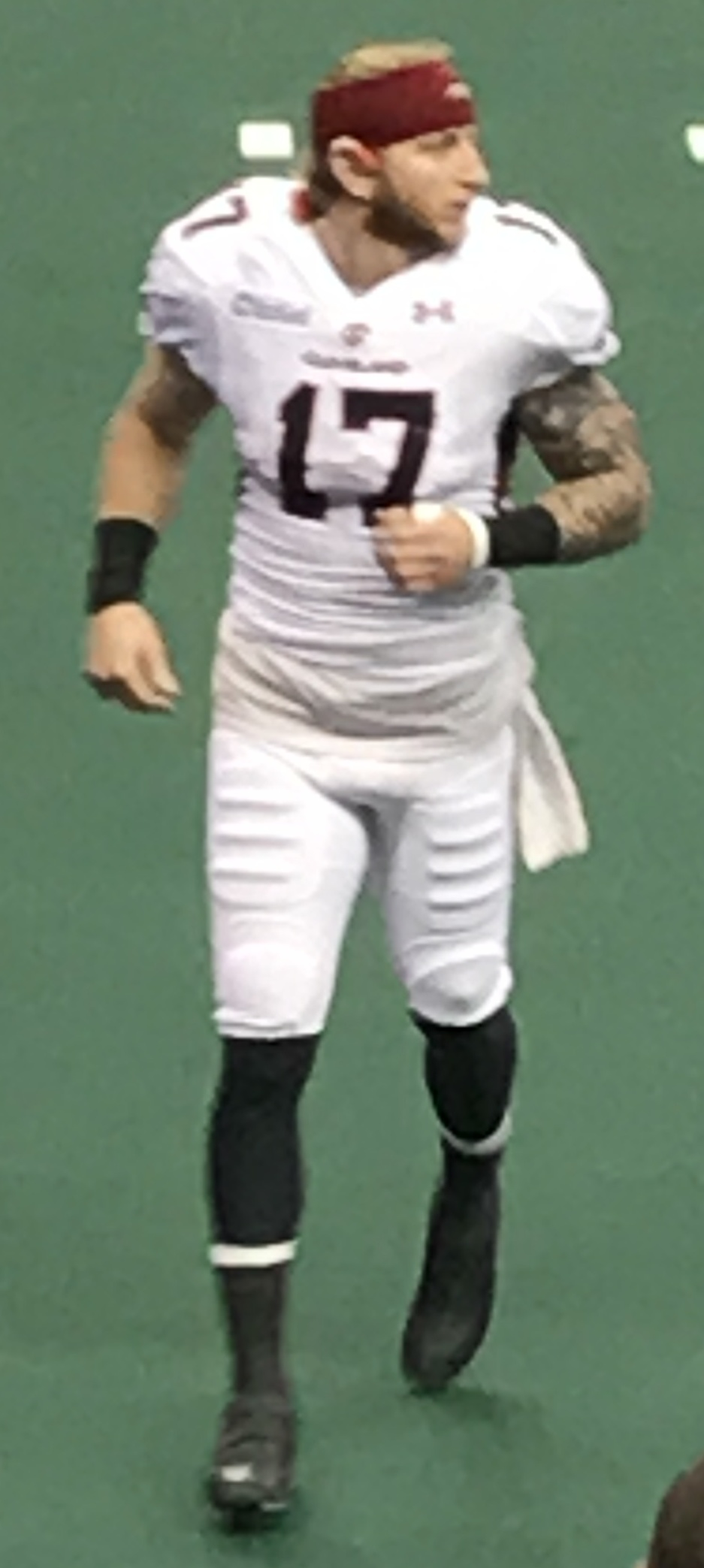
- Taylor with the Cleveland Gladiators in 2017

No. 17, 11
- Position: Wide receiver

Personal information
- Born: February 28, 1987 (age 39); Carmel, Indiana, U.S.
- Listed height: 6 ft 1 in (1.85 m)
- Listed weight: 195 lb (88 kg)

Career information
- High school: Carmel (Carmel, Indiana)
- College: Indiana
- NFL draft: 2010: undrafted

Career history
- Oklahoma City Yard Dawgz (2010); Tulsa Talons (2010); Reading Express (2011); Iowa Barnstormers (2012–2013); Cleveland Gladiators (2014–2017); Beijing Lions (2016); Guangzhou Power (2018)*; Albany Empire (2018–2019)
- * Offseason or practice squad member only

Awards and highlights
- ArenaBowl champion (2019); First-team All-Arena (2016); Al Lucas Hero Jason Foundation Award (2016); China Bowl champion (2016); CAFL All-Pro North Division All-Star (2016); 2009 Rudy Award nominee

Career AFL statistics
- Receptions: 543
- Receiving yards: 6,539
- Receiving touchdowns: 130
- Total tackles: 71
- Interceptions: 4
- Stats at ArenaFan.com

Collin William Taylor (born February 28, 1987) is an American former professional football wide receiver who played in the Arena Football League (AFL) from 2010 to 2019.

Taylor attended Carmel High School, in Carmel, Indiana. He played two years as a wide receiver. As a senior in 2004, he led the Greyhounds with 45 catches for 900 yards and 12 touchdowns, helping them to an 8–4 season. After his senior season, he moved on to Indiana University where he redshirted in 2005, played wide receiver from 2006 through 2008 and finished his career as a free safety in 2009.

== Early life ==
Born the son of John and Catherine Taylor, Collin attended Carmel High School, in Carmel, Indiana. He played two years as a wide receiver. As a senior in 2004, he led the Greyhounds with 45 catches for 900 yards and 12 touchdowns, helping them to an 8–4 season.

== College career ==
Taylor walked-on to the Indiana Hoosiers football team in fall of 2005 and redshirted that same season. During the 2006 season, Taylor did not appear in a single game for the Hoosiers. In 2007, Taylor made his college debut against Indiana State. Taylor played in three games during the season, appearing only on special teams. During the 2008 season, Taylor appeared in all 12 games for the Hoosiers games, making his first career receptions against Iowa on October 11. 11 weeks into the season, the Hoosiers were faced with a rash of injuries, so Taylor moved from wide receiver to free safety for the Hoosiers. Taylor graduated in 2009 with a bachelors in sport communication with a minor in telecommunications.

=== College statistics ===
		Receiving					Defensive						
Season	Team	GP	Rec	Yds	Avg	TD	Solo Tkl	Asst Tkl	Total Tkl	Sacks	INT	FF	FR
2006	Indiana	0	0	0	0.0	0	0	0	0	0	0	0	0
2007	Indiana	3	0	0	0.0	0	0	0	0	0	0	0	0
2008	Indiana	12	1	3	3.0	0	0	0	0	0	0	0	0
2009	Indiana	12	0	0	0.0	0	18	4	22	0	2	1	1
	Totals	27	1	3	3.0	0	18	4	22	0	2	1	1

== Professional career ==
=== Pre-draft ===
Prior to the 2010 NFL draft, Taylor was projected to be undrafted by NFLDraftScout.com. He was rated as the 62nd-best free safety in the draft. He was not invited to the NFL Scouting Combine, he posted the following numbers during his pro-day workouts at Indiana University:

Pre-draft measurables
Height	Weight	40-yard dash	10-yard split	20-yard split	20-yard shuttle	Three-cone drill	Vertical jump	Broad jump	Bench press
6 ft 0 in (1.83 m)	198 lb (90 kg)	4.65 s	1.65 s	2.70 s	4.29 s	7.08 s	36.5 in (0.93 m)	10 ft 3 in (3.12 m)	17 reps
All values from 2010 Indiana Pro Day

=== Oklahoma City Yard Dawgz ===
After going undrafted in 2010, Taylor was assigned to the Oklahoma City Yard Dawgz of the Arena Football League (AFL). The only game in which Taylor played for the Yard Dawgz came on May 28, when he had an interception return for a touchdown against the Alabama Vipers. He was released before the season's end.

=== Tulsa Talons ===
Shortly after his release, Taylor joined the Tulsa Talons. The Talons were short on players due to injury, so they offered Taylor a chance to return to his natural position of wide receiver, and he scored a touchdown on just his second career professional reception.

=== Reading Express ===
Taylor joined the Reading Express of the Indoor Football League (IFL) in 2011. He was 3rd on the team with 651 yards receiving and had 15 touchdowns, as the Express went 8–6 and lost in the IFL United Conference Semi-Finals.

=== Iowa Barnstormers ===
Taylor joined the Iowa Barnstormers in 2012. Taylor re-signed with the Barnstormers for the 2013 season.

=== Cleveland Gladiators ===
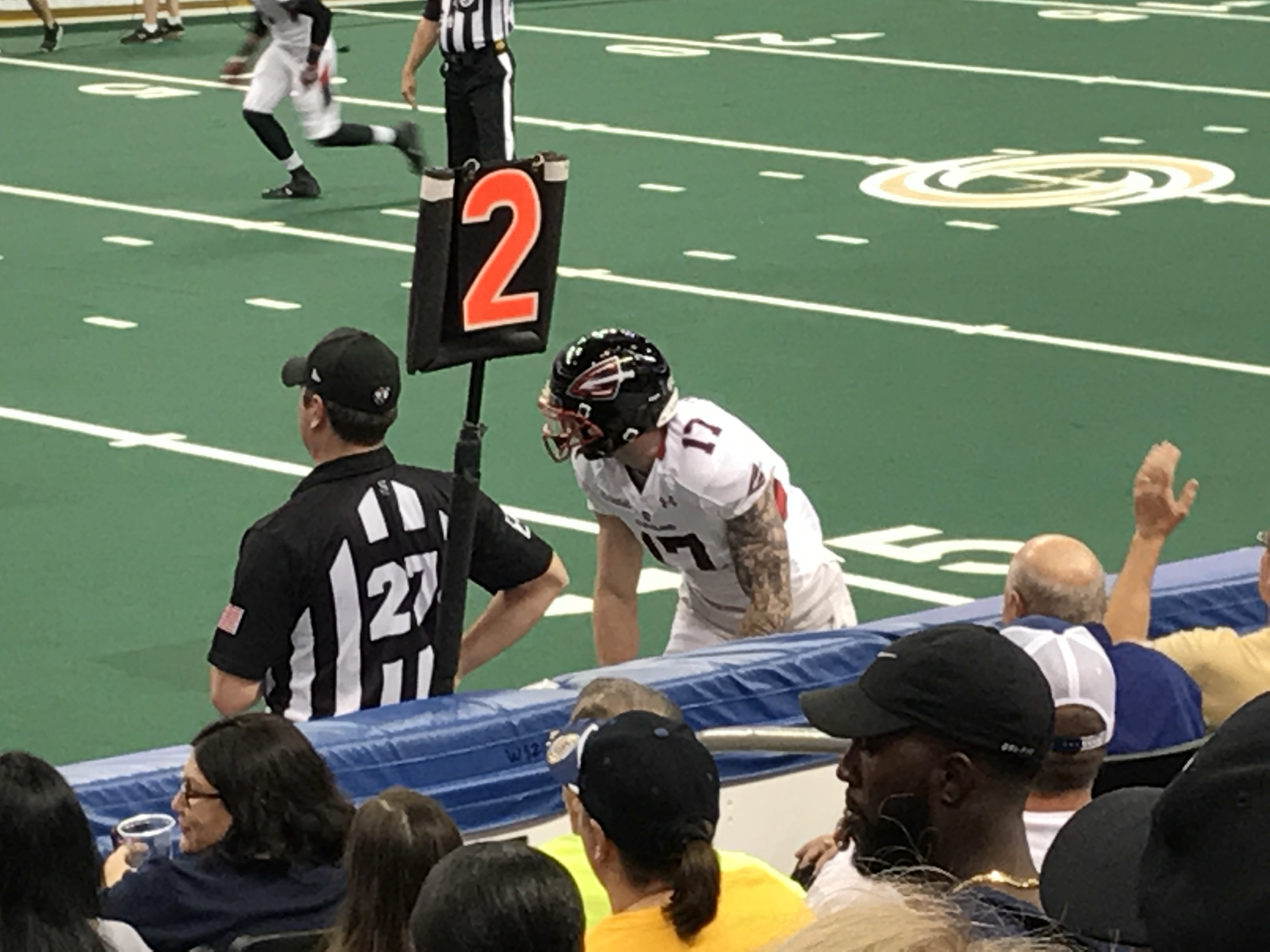
Taylor in 2017

Taylor was assigned to the Cleveland Gladiators on October 1, 2013. He won the Al Lucas Hero Jason Foundation Award in 2016.

=== Beijing Lions ===
Taylor was selected by the Beijing Lions of the China Arena Football League (CAFL) in the fifth round of the 2016 CAFL draft. He earned All-Pro North Division All-Star honors after catching 45 passes for 586 yards and 12 touchdowns.

=== Guangzhou Power ===
Taylor was listed on the Guangzhou Power's roster for the 2018 season.

=== Albany Empire ===
On April 9, 2018, he was assigned to the Albany Empire. On March 14, 2019, Taylor returned to the Empire when he was again assigned to the team.

== Personal life ==
Taylor is a certified personal trainer. He has worked in the physical fitness industry as early as 2013. Starting in 2017, he worked as a performance coach at the T3 Performance training facility in Avon, Ohio until 2023. From then Taylor took over as director of operations in the T3 Performance branch located in the Drusinski Sports Medicine Institute at the Ahuja Medical Center in Beachwood, Ohio.
