= Ted Jennings =

American gridiron football player (born 1990)

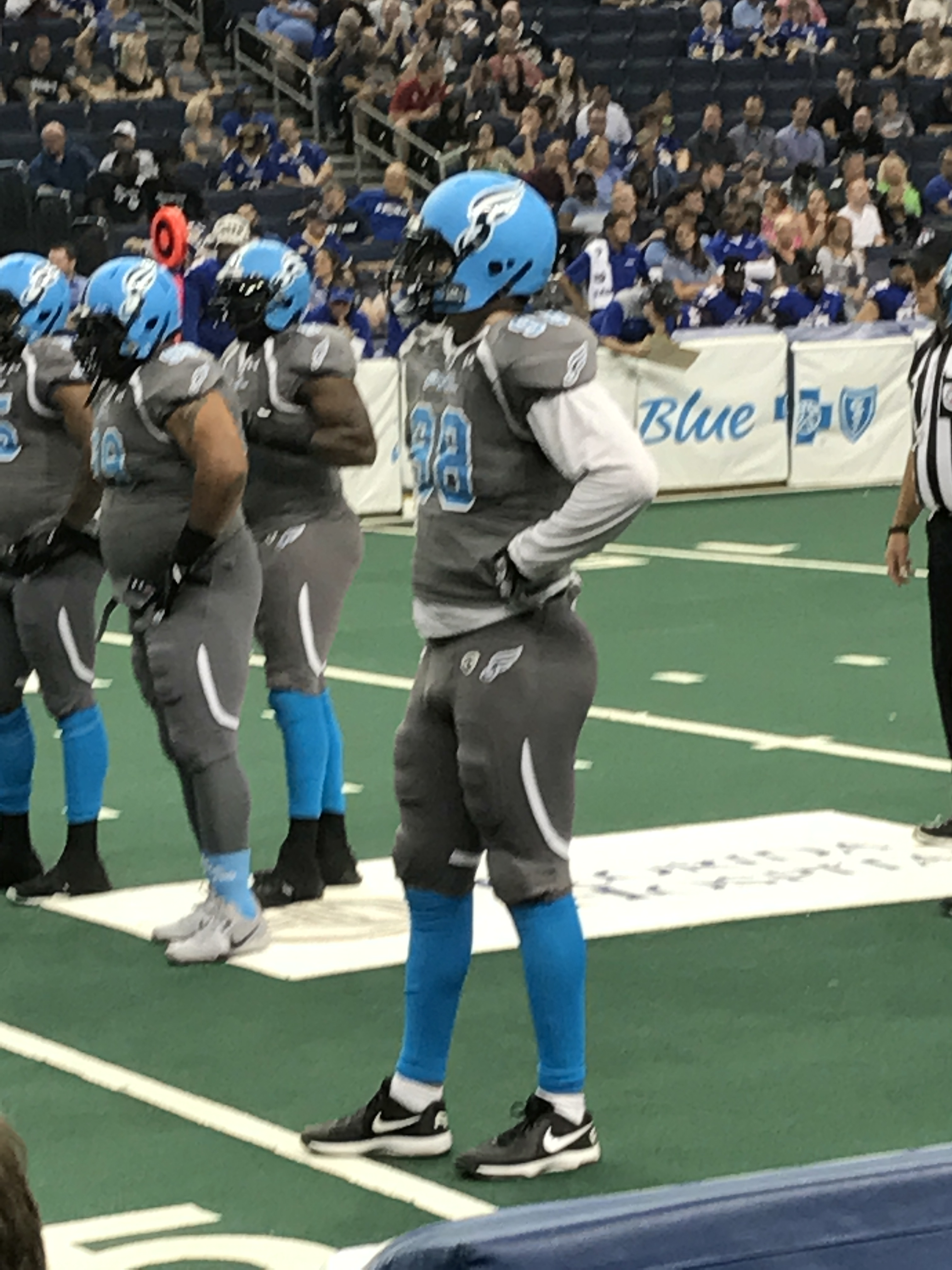
- Jennings with the Philadelphia Soul in 2017

No. 65, 98
- Position: Defensive end

Personal information
- Born: March 15, 1990 (age 36); Dayton, Ohio, U.S.
- Listed height: 6 ft 6 in (1.98 m)
- Listed weight: 270 lb (122 kg)

Career information
- High school: Chaminade-Julienne (Dayton)
- College: Connecticut
- NFL draft: 2013: undrafted

Career history
- Philadelphia Soul (2014–2017); FXFL Blacktips (2015); Montreal Alouettes (2015)*; Beijing Lions (2016)*
- * Offseason or practice squad member only

Awards and highlights
- 2× ArenaBowl champion (2016, 2017); First-team All-Arena (2014); Second-team All-Arena (2016); Philadelphia Soul single-season sack record; Philadelphia Soul single-game sack record

Career AFL statistics
- Total tackles: 57
- Sacks: 21.5
- Forced fumbles: 5
- Fumble recoveries: 2
- Stats at ArenaFan.com

Edward Jennings (born March 15, 1990), known as Ted or Teddy Jennings, is an American former professional football defensive end who played four seasons with the Philadelphia Soul of the Arena Football League (AFL). He was signed by the Soul as an undrafted free agent in 2014. He played college football at Connecticut.

== Early life ==
Jennings was born on March 15, 1990 in Dayton, Ohio. His father Edward Farmer played college football for Villanova from 1970 to 1973. In his junior season in 2007, Jennings earned Division III All-Ohio, All-District and All-League First Team accolades. The following year, Jennings posted 80 tackles in his senior season.

== College career ==
Jennings committed to the University of Connecticut where he redshirted the 2008 season. He spent the 2009 summer training at the Soar of Columbus Fitness Systems facility in Lewis Center, Ohio in preparation for his eventual first active season of college football. Jennings joined the Huskies as their defensive end for the game against Rhode Island. He returned for the 2010 season where he played in 12 games. During the 2010 season, Jennings totaled two tackles including a tackle made in the game against West Virginia and one tackle made in the game against Buffalo. During the 2011 season, Jennings played starting defensive end for the first five games before an injury caused him to miss the season's last two games. He opted as a redshirt senior for the 2012 season, in which there were no guarantees for game time. He graduated from UConn in 2013.

== Professional career ==
Jennings was a member of the FXFL Blacktips and Montreal Alouettes during different periods of the 2015 sports season. He was also part of the Beijing Lions during its 2016 season. He spent the longest portion of his career in the Arena Football League as a member of the Philadelphia Soul from 2014 to 2017.

Jennings was selected by the Beijing Lions of the China Arena Football League (CAFL) in the fourth round of the 2016 CAFL draft.
