= 2016 Arena Football League season =

- League: Arena Football League
- Sport: Arena football
- Duration: April 1, 2016 – August 26, 2016

Regular season
- Season MVP: Nick Davila, ARZ

League postseason
- American Conference champions: Philadelphia Soul
- American Conference runners-up: Jacksonville Sharks
- National Conference champions: Arizona Rattlers
- National Conference runners-up: Cleveland Gladiators

ArenaBowl XXIX
- Champions: Philadelphia Soul
- Runners-up: Arizona Rattlers
- Finals MVP: Shaun Kauleinamoku, PHI

AFL seasons
- ← 2015 2017 →

National, American

The 2016 Arena Football League season was the 29th season in the history of the Arena Football League. Prior to the start of the season, the league contracted to eight teams. The 16-game regular season then began on April 1, 2016 and ended on August 1, 2016. The league, however, kept its eight-team playoff format, which meant that every club qualified for the postseason.

== League business ==
=== Teams ===
The Las Vegas Outlaws and the New Orleans VooDoo were dropped from the league at the end of the 2015 season because new ownership groups could not be found for either team. The Spokane Shock jumped to the Indoor Football League on September 1, 2015. The AFL claimed ownership of the Shock name, forcing the team to rename itself the Spokane Empire. On October 30, 2015, the league announced that there would not be any expansion teams for the 2016 season; this event occurred just under three hours before what had been slated to be the expected announcement of an expansion franchise in San Antonio to be owned by the ownership group of the San Antonio Spurs. The group owning the 2015 league champion San Jose SaberCats returned the franchise to the league on November 12, 2015 for "reasons unrelated to League operations". Commissioner Scott Butera said the league would try to find new ownership, but this was not forthcoming in time for the team to operate during the 2016 season to defend its championship. Because the league was now down to eight teams for the 2016 season, there were still the American and National Conferences but no divisional play. The Cleveland Gladiators were moved to the National Conference to maintain a balance between the conferences. The league took over operations of the former Portland Thunder in January 2016 and rebranded it as the Portland Steel. The 2016 schedule was announced on December 10, 2015.

=== ArenaBowl Playoffs ===
All teams from both conferences qualified for the playoffs. As in the prior season, there were the Conference Semifinals, the Conference Championships, and ArenaBowl XXIX.

In the American Semifinals, the Soul beat the Storm 63–41 in Allentown, Pennsylvania. The Sharks beat the Predators 69–68 in overtime; the National Semifinals saw the Rattlers beat the Steel 84–40 and the Gladiators beat the Kiss 56–52 in San Diego, California.

The Rattlers doubled up the Gladiators 82–41 in the National Conference title game. In the American Conference title game, the Soul edged the Sharks by a score of 55–50.

The Philadelphia Soul upset the heavily-favored Arizona Rattlers 56–42 in ArenaBowl XXIX in Glendale, Arizona for their second AFL title.

=== Alignment ===
Conference	Teams
American	Jacksonville Sharks, Orlando Predators, Philadelphia Soul, Tampa Bay Storm
National	Arizona Rattlers, Cleveland Gladiators, Los Angeles Kiss, Portland Steel

== Regular season standings ==
2016 American Conference standings
Team	Overall			Points			Records	
Team	W	L	PCT	PF	PA	CON	Home	Away
x-Philadelphia Soul	13	3	.813	983	776	5–1	7–1	6–2
Orlando Predators	12	4	.750	893	781	5–3	6–2	6–2
Jacksonville Sharks	7	9	.438	829	774	5–3	3–5	4–4
Tampa Bay Storm	2	14	.125	568	868	0–8	2–6	0–8

2016 National Conference standings
Team	Overall			Points			Record	
Team	W	L	PCT	PF	PA	CON	Home	Away
x-Arizona Rattlers	13	3	.813	1,068	766	8–0	8–0	5–3
Los Angeles Kiss	7	9	.438	736	748	4–4	5–4	2–5
Cleveland Gladiators	7	9	.438	826	934	2–4	4–4	3–5
Portland Steel	3	13	.188	670	926	1–7	3–4	0–9

x - Clinched conference title.

== Playoffs ==
Conference Semifinals
1	Arizona	84
4	Portland	40
National Conference
2	Los Angeles	52
3	Cleveland	56
1	Philadelphia	63
4	Tampa Bay	41
American Conference
2	Orlando	68
3	Jacksonville	69^{OT}

Conference Championships
1	Arizona	82
3	Cleveland	41
1	Philadelphia	55
3	Jacksonville	50

ArenaBowl XXIX
N1	Arizona	42
A1	Philadelphia	56

=== Conference semifinals ===
Conference	Date	Kickoff	Away	Score	Home	Game site	Recap
American	August 6	7:00 p.m. EDT	Jacksonville Sharks	69–68 (OT)	Orlando Predators	Amway Center	
National	August 6	10:00 p.m. EDT	Portland Steel	40–84	Arizona Rattlers	Talking Stick Resort Arena	
American	August 7	6:00 p.m. EDT	Tampa Bay Storm	41–63	Philadelphia Soul	PPL Center	
National	August 7	6:00 p.m. EDT	Cleveland Gladiators	56–52	Los Angeles Kiss	Valley View Casino Center	

=== Conference finals ===
Conference	Date	Kickoff	Away	Score	Home	Game site	Recap
National	August 13	9:30 p.m. EDT	Cleveland Gladiators	41–82	Arizona Rattlers	Talking Stick Resort Arena	
American	August 14	6:00 p.m. EDT	Jacksonville Sharks	50–55	Philadelphia Soul	PPL Center	

=== ArenaBowl XXIX ===
Date	Kickoff	Away	Score	Home	Game site	Recap
August 26	7:00 PM EDT	Philadelphia Soul	56–42	Arizona Rattlers	Gila River Arena	

== All-Arena team ==
Offense
Position	First team	Second team
Quarterback	Nick Davila, Arizona	Dan Raudabaugh, Philadelphia
Fullback	Mykel Benson, Arizona	Jeramie Richardson, Philadelphia
Wide receiver	Joe Hills, Jacksonville; Rod Windsor, Arizona; Brandon Thompkins, Orlando	Donovan Morgan, Los Angeles; T. T. Toliver, Tampa Bay; Collin Taylor, Cleveland
Center	Jordan Mudge, Arizona (tie); Joe Madsen, Cleveland (tie)	Wayne Tribue, Philadelphia
Offensive lineman	Adam Smith, Philadelphia; Cornelius Lewis, Jacksonville	Neal Tivis, Philadelphia; D. J. Brandel, Cleveland

Defense
Position	First team	Second team
Defensive lineman	Jake Metz, Philadelphia; Damien Borel, Arizona	Teddy Jennings, Philadelphia; Darryl Cato-Bishop, Orlando
Nose guard	Randy Colling, Cleveland	Dimetrio Tyson, Arizona
Middle linebacker	Tyre Glasper, Arizona	Dexter Jackson, Jacksonville
Jack linebacker	Joe Goosby, Philadelphia	Terence Moore, Orlando
Defensive back	Tracy Belton, Philadelphia; Greg Reid, Jacksonville; Varmah Sonie, Orlando	Dwayne Hollis, Philadelphia; Marvin Ross, Cleveland; Fred Obi, Los Angeles

Special teams
Position	First team	Second team
Kicker	Tommy Frevert, Philadelphia	Mark Lewis, Orlando
Kick returner	Brandon Thompkins, Orlando	Larry Beavers, Cleveland
