= 2014 Arizona Rattlers season =

Indoor football season

- Owner: Ron Shurts
- Head coach: Kevin Guy
- Home stadium: US Airways Center

Results
- Record: 15–3
- Division place: 1st NC West
- Playoffs: Won Conference Semifinals (Thunder) 52–48; Won Conference Championship (SaberCats) 72–56; Won ArenaBowl XXVII (Gladiators) 72–32
- Team MVP: Nick Davila
- Team OPY: Nick Davila

The 2014 Arizona Rattlers season was the 23rd season for the franchise in the Arena Football League, coming off their victory in ArenaBowl XXVI, which was their second consecutive ArenaBowl championship. The team was coached by Kevin Guy and played their home games at the US Airways Center.

== Standings ==
West Division
Team	W	L	PCT	PF	PA	DIV	CON	Home	Away
z-Arizona Rattlers	15	3	.833	1151	905	4–0	11–2	9–0	6–3
San Antonio Talons	3	15	.167	743	1017	1–3	1–5	0–9	3–6
Los Angeles Kiss	3	15	.167	633	957	1–3	3–9	2–7	1–8

z - Clinched division and conference's best record

== Schedule ==
=== Regular season ===
The Rattlers began the season by hosting the Philadelphia Soul, the team that the Rattlers defeated in ArenaBowl XXVI in the previous season, as well as ArenaBowl XXV in 2012. Their final regular season game was on the road against the Orlando Predators on July 26.

Week	Day	Date	Kickoff	Opponent	Results		Location	Attendance	Report
Week	Day	Date	Kickoff	Opponent	Score	Record	Location	Attendance	Report
1	Saturday	March 15	7:00 p.m. MST	Philadelphia Soul	W 62–55 (OT)	1–0	US Airways Center	9,493	
2	Sunday	March 23	4:30 p.m. MST	Spokane Shock	W 68–49	2–0	US Airways Center	7,128	
3	Bye								
4	Saturday	April 5	7:00 p.m. MST	Jacksonville Sharks	W 63–38	3–0	US Airways Center	8,586	
5	Saturday	April 12	8:30 p.m. MST	at San Jose SaberCats	W 57–51	4–0	SAP Center at San Jose	9,123	
6	Saturday	April 19	7:00 p.m. MST	Pittsburgh Power	W 73–69	5–0	US Airways Center	8,179	
7	Saturday	April 26	7:00 p.m. MST	San Antonio Talons	W 69–59	6–0	US Airways Center	8,567	
8	Saturday	May 3	5:00 p.m. MST	at Jacksonville Sharks	W 70–61	7–0	Jacksonville Veterans Memorial Arena	9,732	
9	Saturday	May 10	8:00 p.m. MST	at Portland Thunder	W 61–32	8–0	Moda Center	8,863	
10	Saturday	May 17	7:00 p.m. MST	Spokane Shock	W 70–38	9–0	US Airways Center	9,437	
11	Sunday	May 25	8:00 p.m. MST	at Los Angeles Kiss	W 70–25	10–0	Honda Center	11,302	
12	Saturday	May 31	7:30 p.m. MST	San Jose SaberCats	W 51–42	11–0	US Airways Center	12,094	
13	Friday	June 6	8:00 p.m. MST	at Portland Thunder	W 70–59	12–0	Moda Center	8,292	
14	Saturday	June 14	6:00 p.m. MST	at San Antonio Talons	W 70–34	13–0	Alamodome	5,692	
15	Saturday	June 21	7:00 p.m. MST	Los Angeles Kiss	W 83–47	14–0	US Airways Center	10,750	
16	Friday	June 27	8:30 p.m. MST	at San Jose SaberCats	L 62–33	14–1	SAP Center at San Jose	7,373	
17	Bye								
18	Saturday	July 12	8:00 p.m. MST	at Spokane Shock	L 66–73	14–2	Spokane Veterans Memorial Arena	9,362	
19	Sunday	July 20	4:00 p.m. MST	Portland Thunder	W 65–55	15–2	US Airways Center	13,120	
20	Saturday	July 26	5:00 p.m. MST	at Orlando Predators	L 50–56	15–3	CFE Arena	8,550	

=== Playoffs ===
Round	Day	Date	Kickoff	Opponent	Results	Location	Attendance	Report
NC Semifinals	Sunday	August 3	3:00 p.m. MST	Portland Thunder	W 52–48	US Airways Center	6,753	
NC Championship	Sunday	August 10	6:00 p.m. MST	San Jose SaberCats	W 72–56	US Airways Center	8,581	
ArenaBowl XXVII	Saturday	August 23	5:00 p.m. MST	Cleveland Gladiators	W 72–32	Quicken Loans Arena	18,410	

== Final roster ==
2014 Arizona Rattlers roster
Quarterbacks: 10 Nick Davila; 9 Jason Murrietta; Fullbacks: 8 Alex Singleton; Wide receivers: 5 Jason Geathers; 81 Chris Jackson; 12 Tysson Poots; 15 Kerry Reed; 1 Rod Windsor	Offensive linemen: 60 Sherman Carter; 75 Cornelius Dixon; 69 Michael Huey; 68 Keith Williams; Defensive linemen: 6 Cliff Dukes; 77 Anttaj Hawthorne; 97 Leon Mackey; 90 Quinn Pitcock; 70 Marcus Pittman	Linebackers: 94 Tyre Glasper; Defensive backs: 11 Arkeith Brown; 24 Allen Chapman; 19 Marquis Floyd; 23 Donovan Henley; 20 Jeremy Kellem; Kickers: 92 Craig Ratanamorn	Injured reserve: 26 Antonio Fenelus DB; 7 Andrew Helmick WR; 95 Nicolas Jean-Baptiste DL; 66 Jeff Maddux OL; -- Alex Magee DL; 3 Jared Perry WR; 2 Maurice Purify WR; 65 Isaac Remington DL; League suspended: -- Julius Pruitt WR; Refuse to report: -- Trent Allmang-Wilder DL; -- Da'Mon Merkerson DB; Other league exempt: -- Derek Dennis OL; -- Will Hill DB; -- Ikponmwosa Igbinosun DL; Inactive reserve: 73 Joe Gibbs OL; 72 Will Wright OL; Recallable reassignment: Currently vacant; Rookies in italics Roster updated August 20, 2014; 24 Active, 16 Inactive
