= 2014 Cleveland Gladiators season =

Arena Football League team season

- Head coach: Steve Thonn
- Home stadium: Quicken Loans Arena

Results
- Record: 17–1
- Division place: 1st AC East
- Playoffs: Won American Conference Semifinals 39-37 (Soul); Won American Conference Championship 56-46 (Predators); Lost ArenaBowl XXVII (Rattlers) 32–72

The 2014 Cleveland Gladiators season was the 15th season for the franchise in the Arena Football League, and their fifth while in Cleveland. The team was coached by Steve Thonn and played their home games at Quicken Loans Arena. By finishing the regular season with a 17–1 record, the Gladiators set a league record for wins in a single season (this record was tied one year later by the San Jose SaberCats).

== Standings ==
East Division
Team	W	L	PCT	PF	PA	DIV	CON	Home	Away
z-Cleveland Gladiators	17	1	.944	991	782	7–1	12–1	9–0	8–1
x-Pittsburgh Power	15	3	.833	1015	778	6–2	11–2	8–1	7–2
x-Philadelphia Soul	9	9	.500	1021	949	2–5	7–7	7–2	2–7
Iowa Barnstormers	6	12	.333	848	1046	0–7	2–10	3–6	3–6

x - Clinched playoff berth
z - Clinched division and conference's best record

== Schedule ==
=== Regular season ===
The Gladiators began the season by visiting the Pittsburgh Power on March 15. Their final regular season game was on July 26, on the road against the Tampa Bay Storm.

Week	Day	Date	Kickoff	Opponent	Results		Location	Attendance	Report
Week	Day	Date	Kickoff	Opponent	Score	Record	Location	Attendance	Report
1	Saturday	March 15	5:00 p.m. EDT	at Pittsburgh Power	W 63–53	1–0	Consol Energy Center	7,742	
2	Bye								
3	Saturday	March 29	8:00 p.m. EDT	at New Orleans VooDoo	W 37–26	2–0	Smoothie King Center	5,695	
4	Friday	April 4	7:30 p.m. EDT	Iowa Barnstormers	W 54–47	3–0	Quicken Loans Arena	10,255	
5	Saturday	April 12	10:00 p.m. EDT	at Los Angeles Kiss	W 40–30	4–0	Honda Center	10,570	
6	Saturday	April 19	10:00 p.m. EDT	at Spokane Shock	W 52–50	5–0	Spokane Veterans Memorial Arena	8,752	
7	Saturday	April 26	7:00 p.m. EDT	Pittsburgh Power	W 55–28	6–0	Quicken Loans Arena	11,083	
8	Bye								
9	Saturday	May 10	7:00 p.m. EDT	Los Angeles Kiss	W 45–42	7–0	Quicken Loans Arena	10,472	
10	Saturday	May 17	8:05 p.m. EDT	at Iowa Barnstormers	W 63–46	8–0	Wells Fargo Arena	7,156	
11	Friday	May 23	7:00 p.m. EDT	Philadelphia Soul	W 54–52	9–0	Quicken Loans Arena	10,659	
12	Saturday	May 31	5:00 p.m. EDT	at Pittsburgh Power	L 34–48	9–1	Consol Energy Center	5,348	
13	Saturday	June 7	7:00 p.m. EDT	Iowa Barnstormers	W 86–49	10–1	Quicken Loans Arena	9,857	
14	Saturday	June 14	7:00 p.m. EDT	New Orleans VooDoo	W 62–46	11–1	Quicken Loans Arena	9,404	
15	Saturday	June 21	6:00 p.m. EDT	at Philadelphia Soul	W 69–68	12–1	Wells Fargo Center	8,033	
16	Friday	June 27	7:00 p.m. EDT	Tampa Bay Storm	W 48–41	13–1	Quicken Loans Arena	10,855	
17	Saturday	July 5	7:00 p.m. EDT	Portland Thunder	W 61–40	14–1	Quicken Loans Arena	9,840	
18	Saturday	July 12	8:00 p.m. EDT	at San Antonio Talons	W 50–47 (OT)	15–1	Alamodome	8,217	
19	Saturday	July 19	7:00 p.m. EDT	Jacksonville Sharks	W 62–20	16–1	Quicken Loans Arena	13,064	
20	Saturday	July 26	7:30 p.m. EDT	at Tampa Bay Storm	W 56–49	17–1	Tampa Bay Times Forum	14,770	

=== Playoffs ===
Round	Day	Date	Kickoff	Opponent	Results	Location	Attendance	Report
AC Semifinals	Saturday	August 2	7:00 p.m. EDT	Philadelphia Soul	W 39–37	Quicken Loans Arena	12,648	
AC Championship	Sunday	August 10	3:00 p.m. EDT	Orlando Predators	W 56–46	Quicken Loans Arena	14,543	
ArenaBowl XXVII	Saturday	August 23	8:00 p.m. EDT	Arizona Rattlers	L 32–72	Quicken Loans Arena	18,410	

- If Cleveland would have won ArenaBowl XXVII, they would have ended a 50+ year championship drought in the city of Cleveland. However, this feat would later be accomplished by the Cleveland Cavaliers in 2016 after coming back from a 3-1 deficit in the 2016 NBA Finals to win over the Golden State Warriors.

== Final roster ==
2014 Cleveland Gladiators roster
Quarterbacks: 10 Shane Austin; 14 Chris Dieker; Fullbacks: Currently vacant; Wide receivers: 7 Tom Gilson; 16 Dominick Goodman; 6 Thyron Lewis; 15 Royce Pollard; 17 Collin Taylor	Offensive linemen: 74 Shannon Breen; 71 C. J. Cobb; 96 Corey Howard; 45 Jason Jones; 79 Kitt O'Brien; Defensive linemen: 55 Luke Black; 95 Rudy Cerami; 9 Jamie Clavell-Head; 44 Randy Colling; 56 Willie McGinnis; 42 Louis Nzegwu	Linebackers: 20 Gary Butler; 28 Alvin Ray Jackson; Defensive backs: 3 LaRoche Jackson; 2 Dominic Jones; 5 Joe Phinisee; 8 Christian Wise; Kickers: 4 Aaron Pettrey	Injured reserve: 88 Tyrone Collins WR; 11 Anthony Degrate DL; 50 Jacob Hardwick DL; 76 Dashawn Johnson OL; 97 Julian Miller DL; 99 Robert Rose DL; 75 Chad Schofield OL; 9 Brandon Stephens DB; 23 Tony Tatum LB; Other league exempt: 76 Dominic Alford OL; 33 Brian Brikowski LB; -- Darren Keyton OL; 1 Marrio Norman DB; Refused to report: 90 Darren Branch LB; League suspension: 19 Rashad Barksdale DB; 21 Larry Ford DL; -- Brian Gamble DB; 69 Jason Thomas TE; Inactive reserve: 92 Alex Daniels DL; Recallable reassignment: Currently vacant; Rookies in italics Roster updated August 8, 2014; 25 Active, 18 Inactive → More rosters
