= Lee Johnson (lineman) =

American football player, coach, and administrator

No. 60, 98
- Positions: Offensive lineman, defensive lineman

Personal information
- Born: June 9, 1967 (age 59); Florissant, Missouri, U.S.
- Listed height: 6 ft 1 in (1.85 m)
- Listed weight: 270 lb (122 kg)

Career information
- College: Missouri
- NFL draft: 1990: undrafted

Career history

Playing
- Kansas City Chiefs (1990)*; Washington Redskins (1991)*; Calgary Stampeders (1992)*; BC Lions (1992); Tampa Bay Storm (1993); Shreveport Pirates (1994); Charlotte Rage (1995–1996)
- * Offseason or practice squad member only

Coaching
- Winnipeg Blue Bombers (1997) Defensive line coach; Winnipeg Blue Bombers (1998) Defensive line coach; Carolina Cobras (2000) Defensive coordinator; Berlin Thunder (2001–2002) Defensive line coach; Denver Broncos (2002) Intern; Colorado Crush (2003) Defensive coordinator; Colorado Crush (2004–2006) Special teams coordinator, offensive line coach, & defensive line coach; Austin Wranglers (2007) Defensive coordinator; Cleveland Gladiators (2008) Offensive line coach & defensive line coach; Peoria Pirates (2009) Offensive line coach & defensive line coach; Orlando Predators (2010–2011) Defensive coordinator; San Antonio Talons (2012–2014) Head coach; Portland Thunder (2015) Special teams coordinator & assistant defensive coordinator; Lincoln (MO) (2016) Interim head coach

Operations
- Portland Thunder (2015) Director of player operations

Awards and highlights
- 2× World Bowl champion (2001, 2002); ArenaBowl champion (2005)

Career AFL statistics
- Rush Att-Yards-TDs: 34–55–2
- Rec-Yards-TDs: 1–20–0
- Tackles: 18
- Sacks: 3
- Fumble Recoveries: 2
- Stats at ArenaFan.com

Head coaching record
- Regular season: 27–27 (.500)
- Postseason: 0–1 (.000)
- Career: 27–28 (.491)

Lee Johnson (born June 9, 1967) is an arena football coach and former offensive lineman and defensive lineman. He played college football at the University of Missouri.

== Playing career ==
Johnson played defensive line on the Missouri Tigers football team from 1987 to 1990 with his brother Mario. The Washington Redskins signed Johnson after he went unselected in the 1991 NFL draft. He played 2 years as an offensive lineman and defensive lineman in the AFL, with the Charlotte Rage from 1995 to 1996. He first became a regular starting offensive/defensive lineman in 1996 with Charlotte.

== Coaching career ==
In 1997, while not even being one year removed from the AFL, Johnson was a defensive line coach for the Winnipeg Blue Bombers of the Canadian Football League. under head coach Jeff Reinebold. In 1998, Reinebold promoted Johnson to defensive coordinator. In 2000, he returned to the AFL as a defensive coordinator for the Carolina Cobras. He then became a defensive line coach at the NFL Europe level, starting in 2001 with the Berlin Thunder. After coaching Berlin to 2 consecutive World Bowl championships in 2001 & 2002, he moved to the Colorado Crush, and served as defensive coordinator during the 2003 season, before being demoted to offensive and defensive line coach and led the Crush to an ArenaBowl XIX championship. After the 2006 season, Johnson was named the defensive coordinator for the Austin Wranglers of the AFL. After the Wranglers folded, Johnson joined the Cleveland Gladiators as their offensive/defensive line coach. When the AFL shut down, Johnson took the role of line coach with the af2's Peoria Pirates, where he worked under Arena Football Hall of Fame head coach, Mike Hohensee. Johnson then took the defensive coordinator job with the Orlando Predators in 2010 and 2011, helping them extend their longest playoff berth streak in AFL history to 18 and 19 seasons. After the Predators two postseason runs, Johnson was offered the head coaching job for the San Antonio Talons. Johnson helped lead the Talons to a Central Division championship in 2012. Following the 2012 season, Johnson was signed to a 2-year contract extension.

In October 2014, Johnson was hired as the Director of Football Operations for the Portland Thunder. He was also the Assistant Defensive Coordinator and Special Teams Coordinator of the Thunder.

== Head coaching record ==
=== Arena Football League ===
Team	Year	Regular season				Postseason			
Team	Year	Won	Lost	Win %	Finish	Won	Lost	Win %	Result
SA	2012	14	4	.778	1st in NC Central	0	1	.000	Lost to Utah Blaze in Conference Semifinals.
SA	2013	10	8	.556	2nd in NC Central	–	–	–	–
SA	2014	3	15	.167	2nd in NC West	–	–	–	–
Total		27	27	.500		0	1	.000	

=== College ===
Year	Team	Overall	Conference	Standing	Bowl/playoffs
Lincoln Blue Tigers (Great Lakes Valley Conference) (2016)
2016	Lincoln*	1–6	0–4	9th	
Lincoln:		1–6	0–4	* Johnson was interim head coach	
Total:		1–6			
