= ArenaBowl XXVII =

Annual league championship game

Arizona Rattlers (National)	Cleveland Gladiators (American)
72	32
	1	2	3	4	Total
ARI	14	30	14	14	72
CLE	6	7	6	13	32
- Date: August 23, 2014
- Stadium: Quicken Loans Arena; Cleveland, Ohio
- MVP: Nick Davila, Arizona: Nick Davila, Arizona (Offensive Player of the Game); Cliff Dukes, Arizona (Defensive Player of the Game)
- Attendance: 18,410
- Winning coach: Kevin Guy
- Losing coach: Steve Thonn

TV in the United States
- Network: ESPN
- Announcers: Ari Wolfe, Anthony Herron, Sherdrick Bonner, J. B. Long

ArenaBowl XXVII was the 27th edition of the championship in the Arena Football League. The National Conference champion Arizona Rattlers defeated the American Conference champion Cleveland Gladiators, 72–32. The game was played on August 23, 2014, at Quicken Loans Arena in Cleveland, Ohio, the home of the Gladiators.

This was the fourth consecutive ArenaBowl appearance for the Arizona Rattlers, and their third consecutive ArenaBowl championship. For the Cleveland Gladiators, this was the first ArenaBowl in the franchise's 18-year history.

== Venue ==
ArenaBowl XXVII was played at Quicken Loans Arena in Cleveland, Ohio, after it was announced that the ArenaBowl would return to the practice of being hosted by the team with the better regular season record. With the best record of any team in the AFL in 2014, Cleveland was assured of hosting ArenaBowl XXVII by winning the conference championship. The ArenaBowl was played on a busy sports day in Cleveland, as the Cleveland Browns of the National Football League played a home preseason game at FirstEnergy Stadium and the Cleveland Indians of Major League Baseball had a home game at adjacent Progressive Field all at the same time.

== Television ==
In December 2013, it was announced that ESPN had acquired the rights to broadcast arena football games, including ArenaBowl XXVI. This was the first ArenaBowl to be televised on ESPN since 2008, prior to the year-long hiatus taken by the AFL.

== Background ==
=== Arizona Rattlers ===
The Rattlers came into the game as two-time defending champions, appearing in their fourth consecutive ArenaBowl, and ninth overall, tying them with the Tampa Bay Storm for most ArenaBowl appearances. In trying to win their third consecutive ArenaBowl championship, the only team in ArenaBowl history that had done so was the Detroit Drive, having won the third in ArenaBowl IV. In 2014, the Rattlers began the regular season with a 14–0 record, the best start to a season by any team in AFL history. Their first loss came in week 16 when they lost to the rival San Jose SaberCats. Despite losing last three of their last four games, the Rattlers finished the season 15–3, as they did the season prior. In the conference semifinals, they defeated the expansion Portland Thunder in a close 52–48 contest. They hosted the San Jose SaberCats in the conference championship, beating them more decisively, 72–56.

West Division
Team	W	L	PCT	PF	PA	DIV	CON	Home	Away
z-Arizona Rattlers	15	3	.833	1151	905	4–0	11–2	9–0	6–3
San Antonio Talons	3	15	.167	743	1017	1–3	1–5	0–9	3–6
Los Angeles Kiss	3	15	.167	633	957	1–3	3–9	2–7	1–8

z - Clinched division and conference's best record

Week	Date	Opponent	Result
1	March 15	Philadelphia	W 62–55 (OT)
2	March 23	Spokane	W 68–49
3	Bye		
4	April 5	Jacksonville	W 63–38
5	April 12	at San Jose	W 57–51
6	April 19	Pittsburgh	W 73–69
7	April 26	San Antonio	W 69–59
8	May 3	at Jacksonville	W 70–61
9	May 10	at Portland	W 61–32
10	May 17	Spokane	W 70–38
11	May 25	at Los Angeles	W 70–25
12	May 31	San Jose	W 51–42
13	June 6	at Portland	W 70–59
14	June 14	at San Antonio	W 70–34
15	June 21	Los Angeles	W 83–47
16	June 27	at San Jose	L 33–62
17	Bye		
18	July 12	at Spokane	L 66–73
19	July 20	Portland	W 65–55
20	July 26	at Orlando	L 50–56
–	August 3	Portland	W 52–48
–	August 10	San Jose	W 72–56

=== Cleveland Gladiators ===
The Gladiators reached the ArenaBowl for the first time in franchise history. Before moving to Cleveland for the 2008 season, they had previously played in East Rutherford, New Jersey, and Las Vegas, Nevada. The closest the team had ever come to reaching the ArenaBowl since moving to Cleveland was in 2008 when they lost the conference championship. They began the 2014 season with a 9–0 record, one of the best starts to a season in league history. In week 12, their hopes of an undefeated season were ended, but it proved to be the only blemish on their win–loss record, as they finished the season with a league-best 17–1 record. The 17 wins is a league record for a team in a single season. Not all of these wins came easy, however. Cleveland won five games in the regular season on the final play of the game. In the conference semifinals, they notched their sixth last-second win of the season. This one came against the Philadelphia Soul on a field goal as time expired to win by a 39–37 score. In the conference championship, they faced the Orlando Predators. Cleveland defeated Orlando 56–46 to reach the ArenaBowl for the first time in franchise history.

East Division
Team	W	L	PCT	PF	PA	DIV	CON	Home	Away
z-Cleveland Gladiators	17	1	.944	991	782	7–1	12–1	9–0	8–1
x-Pittsburgh Power	15	3	.833	1015	778	6–2	11–2	8–1	7–2
x-Philadelphia Soul	9	9	.500	1021	949	2–5	7–7	7–2	2–7
Iowa Barnstormers	6	12	.333	848	1046	0–7	2–10	3–6	3–6

x - Clinched playoff berth
z - Clinched division and conference's best record

Week	Date	Opponent	Result
1	March 15	at Pittsburgh	W 63–53
2	Bye		
3	March 29	at New Orleans	W 37–26
4	April 4	Iowa	W 54–47
5	April 12	at Los Angeles	W 40–30
6	April 19	at Spokane	W 52–50
7	April 26	Pittsburgh	W 55–28
8	Bye		
9	May 10	Los Angeles	W 45–42
10	May 17	at Iowa	W 63–46
11	May 23	Philadelphia	W 54–52
12	May 31	at Pittsburgh	L 34–48
13	June 7	Iowa	W 86–49
14	June 14	New Orleans	W 62–46
15	June 21	at Philadelphia	W 69–68
16	June 27	Tampa Bay	W 48–41
17	July 5	Portland	W 61–40
18	July 12	at San Antonio	W 50–47 (OT)
19	July 19	Jacksonville	W 62–20
20	July 26	at Tampa Bay	W 56–49
–	August 2	Philadelphia	W 39–37
–	August 10	Orlando	W 56–46

== Box score ==
Quarter	1	2	3	4	Total
Rattlers (NC)	14	30	14	14	72
Gladiators (AC)	6	7	6	13	32

at Quicken Loans Arena, Cleveland, Ohio

- Date: August 23, 2014
- Game time: 8:00 p.m. EDT
- Game attendance: 18,410
- Referee: Reggie Smith

Scoring summary

Quarter	Time	Drive			Team	Scoring information	Score	
Quarter	Time	Plays	Yards	TOP	Team	Scoring information	ARI	CLE
1	13:31	2	45	1:29	ARI	Windsor 41-yard touchdown reception from Davila, Ratanamorn kick good	7	0
1	7:35	—	—	—	ARI	Interception returned 46 yards for touchdown by Reed, Ratanamorn kick good	14	0
1	2:28	6	40	4:17	CLE	Taylor 9-yard touchdown reception from Austin, Pettrey kick no good	14	6
2	14:19	4	45	2:21	ARI	Jackson 11-yard touchdown reception from Davila, Ratanamorn kick good	21	6
2	12:47	1	–9	0:48	ARI	Austin tackled in end zone for a safety by Dukes	23	6
2	10:51	4	30	2:01	ARI	Poots 12-yard touchdown reception from Davila, Ratanamorn kick good	30	6
2	5:05	6	25	3:27	ARI	Reed 5-yard touchdown reception from Davila, Ratanamorn kick good	37	6
2	0:38	5	35	1:35	CLE	Lewis 15-yard touchdown reception from Austin, Pettrey kick good	37	13
2	0:32	1	10	0:04	ARI	Windsor 10-yard touchdown reception from Davila, Ratanamorn kick good	44	13
3	11:02	3	5	1:37	ARI	Reed 3-yard touchdown reception from Davila, Ratanamorn kick good	51	13
3	6:49	1	30	0:13	ARI	Windsor 30-yard touchdown reception from Davila, Ratanamorn kick good	58	13
3	1:50	6	36	3:52	CLE	Goodman 30-yard touchdown reception from Austin, 2-point pass intercepted	58	19
4	13:17	4	45	2:01	ARI	Poots 15-yard touchdown reception from Davila, Ratanamorn kick good	65	19
4	8:44	5	45	3:38	CLE	Goodman 5-yard touchdown reception from Dieker, Pettrey kick no good	65	25
4	5:54	4	45	2:05	ARI	Jackson 12-yard touchdown reception from Davila, Ratanamorn kick good	72	25
4	1:45	5	30	3:15	CLE	Goodman 6-yard touchdown reception from Dieker, Pettrey kick good	72	32
"TOP" = time of possession. For other American football terms, see Glossary of American football.							72	32
