= Nick Davila =

American football player and coach (born 1985)

No. 10
- Position: Quarterback

Personal information
- Born: May 22, 1985 (age 41); Downey, California, U.S.
- Listed height: 6 ft 3 in (1.91 m)
- Listed weight: 220 lb (100 kg)

Career information
- High school: Damien (La Verne, California)
- College: Chaffey (2003–2004); Cincinnati (2005–2006)
- NFL draft: 2007: undrafted

Career history

Playing
- Spokane Shock (2008–2009); Arizona Rattlers (2010–2016); Washington Valor (2018)

Coaching
- Arizona Rattlers (2017) Quarterbacks and wide receivers coach

Awards and highlights
- 4× ArenaBowl champion (2012, 2013, 2014, 2018); 2× ArenaBowl MVP (2012, 2014); 3× AFL Most Valuable Player (2011, 2014, 2016); AFL Offensive Player of the Year (2014); 2× First-team All-Arena (2014, 2016); 3× Second-team All-Arena (2011, 2012, 2013); Al Lucas AFL Pulse Hero Award (2013); 3× AFL passing touchdowns leader (2011, 2014, 2016); AFL passing yards leader (2014); Arizona Rattlers Ring of Honor; United Bowl champion (2017); ArenaCup champion (X); First-team All-af2 (2009); 2× JUCO All-American (2003–2004)

Career AFL statistics
- Comp. / Att.: 2,614 / 3,876
- Passing yards: 32,616
- TD–INT: 766–91
- QB rating: 123.15
- Rushing TD: 23
- Stats at ArenaFan.com

Nick Davila (born May 22, 1985) is an American former professional football quarterback who played in the Arena Football League (AFL). A four-time ArenaBowl champion, and three-time AFL MVP, he played for the Arizona Rattlers from 2010 to 2016 and the Washington Valor in 2018. He also played for the Spokane Shock of the af2 from 2008 to 2009. Davila is of Mexican American descent, and is nicknamed the "Latin Laser".

He played college football at the University of Cincinnati, after playing two seasons at Chaffey College. While at Chaffey, Davila set multiple school records for passing. When he chose Cincinnati to continue his football career, Davila found himself backing up Dustin Grutza. It was not until his senior season that Davila made his first start playing against the #7 ranked, and undefeated, Rutgers team. Davila led the Bearcats to a 30–11 upset win over the Scarlet Knights, ending Rutgers hopes at a national championship. After going undrafted in the 2007 NFL draft, Davila had a tryout with the Cleveland Browns, but was not signed. He was later signed by the Shock as a street free agent in 2008. Davila led the Shock to a 15–1 regular season record in 2009, and a 74–27 rout of the Wilkes-Barre/Scranton Pioneers in the ArenaCup. With the af2 becoming Arena Football 1 in 2010, Davila left Spokane and signed with the Rattlers. Davila led them to five West Division championships, five National Conference championships, and three ArenaBowl championships.

In 2017, he was the quarterbacks and wide receivers coach for the Rattlers, who had moved to the Indoor Football League (IFL). They went on to win the 2017 United Bowl. He returned to the AFL as a player in 2018, and signed with the Valor. However, he missed the majority of the season after suffering a career-ending neck injury, and the Valor won the ArenaBowl in his absence.

== Early life ==
Born the son of Fernando and Marsha Davila, Nick Davila attended Damien High School in La Verne, California. While at Damien, Davila was a standout quarterback on the football team, as well as a first baseman on the baseball team. His junior year, Davila put up what was at the time, the fifth best season in Damien history, throwing for 1,880 yards and 11 touchdowns. This set Davila up with an opportunity to play at an NCAA Division I college. His senior year, he accepted a scholarship to play for Oregon State. However, in the second game of Davila's senior season of football, he broke his clavicle, and Oregon State head coach, Dennis Erickson reduced the size of scholarship he was offering. He was a high school teammate of Ian Johnson.

== College career ==
=== Chaffey College ===
After high school, Davila attended Chaffey College where he could continue playing football, while showing larger schools that he had recovered from his broken clavicle. In his final game, Davila took a 14–21 loss to the El Camino College Warriors in the Verizon Southern California Bowl. After two impressive All-American seasons, Davila signed with the University of Cincinnati to continue his football career.

College recruiting
Name	Hometown	School	Height	Weight	40^{‡}	Commit date
Nick Davila; QB	La Verne, California	Chaffey College	6 ft 3 in (1.91 m)	190 lb (86 kg)	4.7	Dec 15, 2004
Nick Davila; QB	Recruit ratings: Scout: Rivals:					
Overall recruit ranking: Scout: -- (QB) Rivals: -- (QB), -- (CA)
‡ Refers to 40-yard dash; Note: In many cases, Scout, Rivals, 247Sports, On3, and ESPN may conflict in their listings of height, weight and 40 time.; In these cases, the average was taken. ESPN grades are on a 100-point scale.; Sources: "2005 Team Ranking". Rivals.com.

=== Cincinnati ===
Davila committed to Cincinnati on December 15, 2004. Davila was not heavily recruited, as he only received a FBS scholarship from Cincinnati.

Davila joined the Cincinnati Bearcats in 2005, and played in five games as the backup quarterback to Dustin Grutza. He completed 58 percent of his passes for 344 yards and four touchdowns. Davila saw the most playing time, of his junior year, against Louisville. Davila came in to replace a struggling Grutza, and completed 9-of-15 passes for 136 yards and two touchdowns, but the Bearcats fell 22–46 to the Cardinals. In 2006, Davila was once again the backup quarterback behind Grutza, despite the chance to win the starting job throughout the summer and fall practices. After seeing some playing time in a few games, Davila made his first start playing against the #7 ranked, and undefeated, Rutgers team. Davila led the Bearcats to a 30–11 upset win over the Scarlet Knights, ending Rutgers hopes at a national championship in 2006. Davila led the Bearcats to another victory over Connecticut, as they finished with a 7–5 regular season record, making the team bowl eligible. After the team finished strong, head coach Mark Dantonio left the program to become the head coach at Michigan State. Cincinnati named Brian Kelly the team's new head coach. The Bearcats were then extended an offer to the International Bowl against Western Michigan of the Mid-American Conference. Kelly made the choice to start Davila in the bowl game, and Davila led the Bearcats to a 27–24 victory.

== Professional career ==
=== Pre-draft ===
Prior to the 2007 NFL draft, Davila was projected to be undrafted by NFLDraftScout.com. He was rated as the 60th-best quarterback in the draft. Davila was not invited to the 2007 NFL Scouting Combine in Indianapolis.

Pre-draft measurables
Height	Weight	Arm length	Hand span	40-yard dash	10-yard split	20-yard split	20-yard shuttle	Three-cone drill	Vertical jump	Broad jump
6 ft 3 in (1.91 m)	208 lb (94 kg)	33 1/2	10 in (0.25 m)	4.83 s	1.73 s	2.82 s	4.34 s	6.60 s	30 in (0.76 m)	9 ft 2 in (2.79 m)
All values from 2007 Cincinnati Bearcats Pro Day

After going undrafted, Davila attended rookie minicamp on a tryout basis with the Cleveland Browns but was not signed. He participated in the All American Football League combine in September 2007.

=== Spokane Shock ===
After sitting out the 2007 season, Davila signed with the Spokane Shock of af2 for their 2008 season. Davila had a terrific first season of arena football, as he threw for a franchise-record 2,935 yards and 66 touchdowns, while leading the Shock to a 15–1 regular season record, and a berth in ArenaCup IX. The Shock lost the ArenaCup to the Tennessee Valley Vipers 55–56. With Davila's stellar season, he received multiple Arena Football League (AFL) offers, but re-signed with the Shock for 2009 after the AFL folded. The Shock beat the Wilkes-Barre/Scranton Pioneers by a score of 74–27 in ArenaCup X. In two seasons with the Shock, the team was 38–3 with two championship game appearances, and Davila passed for 6,798 yards and 152 touchdowns.

=== Arizona Rattlers ===
==== 2010 ====
With the Shock moving into the newly reformed AFL in 2010, and Davila a free agent, Arizona Rattlers head coach, Kevin Guy, convinced Davila to sign with the Rattlers, rather than re-signing with the Shock, by telling Davila that the Rattlers would "win a lot of football games." In 2010, Davila and the Rattlers finished 2nd in the Western Division right behind their new rivals and Davila's former team the Spokane Shock. They finished the year at 10–6, as the 4th seed heading into the playoffs. In the opening round, Arizona matched up against the Shock on the road, but lost, and Spokane went on to win ArenaBowl XXIII.

==== 2011 ====
The following year, Davila set a league record for touchdowns, passing yards, and also earned AFL MVP honors. He and the Rattlers accumulated their best record in franchise history, finishing atop the National Conference at 16–2. As the #1 seed heading into the playoffs, the Rattlers yet again faced the Shock. This time they were victorious in their rematch with Spokane, defeating them 62–33. With the win, Arizona advanced to the Conference Championship to play the Chicago Rush. Chicago was one of only two teams to defeat the Rattlers in the regular season, thanks to a game-winning field goal by Chris Gould. In a tightly contested 54–48 shootout, the Snakes squeaked by the Rush, to earn Davila his very first ArenaBowl berth. Arizona faced the American Conference Champion Jacksonville Sharks led by veteran quarterback Aaron Garcia. In another tight back and forth contest, the two teams posted one of the best performances in ArenaBowl history. It appeared as though the Rattlers had scored the game-winning touchdown after Davila hit Kerry Reed with a 12-yard reception with 21 seconds left in the game. However, on 4th down Garcia countered, throwing the game-winning touchdown pass to Jeron Harvey as time expired. With the dramatic finish, the Sharks earned their first ArenaBowl championship. The final score ended 73–70.

==== 2012 ====
In 2012, Davila once again led the Rattlers to a division crown at 13–5, and entered the postseason as the number two seed behind Aaron Garcia and the San Antonio Talons. They defeated division rival San Jose in the opening round, narrowly escaping with a 54–48 victory. In the 2nd round they faced off against their other West conference rivals, the Utah Blaze who had managed to upset Garcia's Talons the week before. In again another close contest, the Rattlers held on to defeat the Blaze 75–68, clinching their 2nd straight National Conference Title. Arizona faced the American Conference Champion Philadelphia Soul in the ArenaBowl, who entered the game as the AFL's top ranked team at 15–3 and heavy favorites in the match-up. Arizona forced the Soul to commit three key turnovers early in the contest and eventually won 72–54. Davila was named the MVP of ArenaBowl XXV and the Rattlers earned their 3rd title in franchise history.

==== 2013 ====
In 2013, Davila signed a two-year contract extension with the Rattlers. He led the Rattlers to their 3rd consecutive ArenaBowl appearance. During ArenaBowl XXVI, Davila threw 6 touchdown passes, hitting game MVP, Rod Windsor, 10 times (50% of Davila's completions). The Rattlers defeated the Philadelphia Soul again 48–39, and became the first squad since the 1995 and 96 Tampa Bay Storm, to repeat as back-to-back Arenabowl Champions. The Rattlers also became the first team in AFL history to repeat as champions the following year against the same opponent.

==== 2014 ====
In 2014, Davila led the Rattlers to a 15–3 regular season record. He threw for 4,778 yards and 127 touchdowns, completing 66.5% of his passes, and throwing only 11 interceptions, en route to a fourth consecutive appearance in the ArenaBowl. Davila is the only quarterback in AFL history to start four straight ArenaBowls. In ArenaBowl XXVII, he threw eight touchdowns, went 19-for-24 for 237 yards, and threw only one interception in their 72–32 rout of the American Conference champion Cleveland Gladiators. This victory made the Rattlers only the second team to win three consecutive ArenaBowls, and earned Davila the Russell Athletic Offensive Player of the Game award, as well as his second ArenaBowl MVP award.

==== 2015 ====
In 2015, the Rattlers finished at 14–4 with two of their losses coming at the hands of the San Jose SaberCats. Davila suffered a lower body injury in week 5 against the Los Angeles Kiss and missed the next four games. Back-ups B. J. Coleman and Shane Boyd filled the void at quarterback by splitting the starts and carrying the Snakes to a 3–1 record until Davila's return. Despite this setback, Arizona managed to win their fifth consecutive division title. In the playoffs the Rattlers defeated the visiting Spokane Shock 72–41 in the opening round. It set the stage for a postseason match-up with the SaberCats for the fourth straight season. It was also the 2nd straight season the two teams met in the Western Conference Championship game. Only this time, San Jose hosted the Rattlers due to a better regular season record of 17–1. The game was a back and forth affair until the last minute. Davila made a touchdown pass with 40 seconds left in the game to put the Rattlers up 67–63, but the SaberCats managed a late touchdown with 8 seconds remaining to pull off the 70–67 victory. As the new Western Conference champions, San Jose advanced to ArenaBowl XXVIII eliminating Davila and the Rattlers from contending for a fourth straight championship or appearing in a fifth straight championship game.

==== 2016 ====
In 2016, the Rattlers finished with a 13–3 record as Davila threw for 4,198 yards and 110 touchdowns. Entering the postseason as the AFL's top ranked seed, the Rattlers faced the Portland Steel in their opening round of the playoffs. Arizona defeated the Steel 84–40 and set a record for most points scored in franchise history. The win advanced Davila and company to their 6th consecutive National Conference championship game. Together, they faced off with the Cleveland Gladiators, who had managed to upset the Los Angeles Kiss on the road 56–52, the previous week. In the game, Davila completed 20 of his 27 passes for 222 yards and seven touchdowns. Arizona's defense forced Cleveland to commit five turnovers, only allowing 41 points. Cleveland's quarterback Arvell Nelson threw several errant passes and two costly interceptions. The Rattlers beat the Gladiators 82–41, en route to their 5th National Conference Championship and a spot in ArenaBowl XXIX. Davila was named the AFL MVP for the third time in his career in 2016. Arizona lost ArenaBowl XXIX to the Philadelphia Soul by a score of 56–42. The Rattlers moved to the Indoor Football League after the 2016 season.

=== Washington Valor ===
On March 19, 2018, Davila was assigned to the Washington Valor of the AFL. He suffered a career-ending neck injury on April 28 in a game against the Philadelphia Soul. He dislocated his neck and broke his cervical spine, causing him to spend 18 hours in traction. Davila stated that his doctor told him he was "centimeters away from being paralyzed". On May 2, he was placed on injured reserve and spent the remainder of the season there. On July 28, 2018, the Valor defeated the Baltimore Brigade by a score of 69–55 to win ArenaBowl XXXI in Davila's absence.

On March 30, 2025, Davila was inducted into the Arizona Rattlers Ring of Honor before their season opener.

== Career statistics ==
Legend
	AFL MVP
	Won the ArenaBowl
	Led the league
**Bold**	Career high

=== AFL ===
Year	Team	Passing							Rushing		
Year	Team	Cmp	Att	Pct	Yds	TD	Int	Rtg	Att	Yds	TD
2010	Arizona	415	**617**	67.3	4,858	102	**18**	119.17	22	33	5
2011	Arizona	**427**	604	**70.7**	4,916	117	10	**127.74**	18	33	2
2012	Arizona	391	589	66.4	**5,500**	113	16	124.58	**30**	**45**	**7**
2013	Arizona	353	541	65.2	4,847	110	15	121.63	23	44	6
2014	Arizona	362	544	66.5	4,778	**127**	11	125.29	18	16	1
2015	Arizona	313	474	66.0	3,519	87	10	118.84	8	10	1
2016	Arizona	353	507	69.6	4,198	110	11	125.15	14	1	1
2018	Washington	33	53	62.3	353	10	0	121.31	3	21	2
Career		2,614	3,876	67.4	32,616	766	91	123.15	133	182	23

=== College ===
Season	Team	Passing						Rushing			
Season	Team	Cmp	Att	Pct	Yds	TD	Int	Att	Yds	Avg	TD
2003	Chaffey	n/a	n/a	n/a	2,787	24	n/a	n/a	n/a	n/a	n/a
2004	Chaffey	182	298	61.1	2,892	23	13	n/a	n/a	n/a	n/a
2005	Cincinnati	26	45	57.8	344	4	2	4	12	3.0	0
2006	Cincinnati	70	118	59.3	1,057	8	3	28	-26	-0.9	1
Career		n/a	n/a	n/a	7,080	59	n/a	n/a	n/a	n/a	n/a

== Coaching career ==
In December 2016, Davila was announced as the quarterbacks and wide receivers coach of the Rattlers, who had recently left the AFL for the Indoor Football League (IFL). On July 8, 2017, the Rattlers defeated the Sioux Falls Storm in the United Bowl by a score of 50–41. He left after one season.
