= Cornelius Dixon =

American football player (born 1984)

No. 70, 75
- Position: Offensive lineman

Personal information
- Born: April 7, 1984 (age 42); Marianna, Florida, U.S.
- Listed height: 6 ft 6 in (1.98 m)
- Listed weight: 345 lb (156 kg)

Career information
- High school: Marianna
- College: Missouri Valley
- NFL draft: 2010: undrafted

Career history
- Kansas City Command (2011–2012); Arizona Rattlers (2013–2014); New Orleans VooDoo (2015); San Jose SaberCats (2015); Los Angeles KISS (2016); Tampa Bay Storm (2016)

Awards and highlights
- 3× ArenaBowl champion (2013, 2014, 2015)

Career AFL statistics
- Receptions: 8
- Receiving yards: 102
- Receiving TDs: 0
- Tackles: 3
- Stats at ArenaFan.com

Cornelius Dixon (born April 7, 1984) is an American former football offensive lineman. He played football at Marianna High School in Marianna, Florida; upon graduation, he enrolled at Missouri Valley College (where he continued playing football). While at MVC, Dixon was honored as a First Team All-Conference offensive lineman.

In December 2010, Dixon signed with the Kansas City Command of the Arena Football League. He saw plenty of playing time as a rookie; all told, Dixon played in thirty regular season games (of thirty-six total) during his two-year stint with the Command. However, the Command struggled both on the field and at the gate during Dixon's time there. When the team folded in 2012, Dixon joined the defending AFL Champion Arizona Rattlers. His stint in Arizona, in many regards, mirrored his time in Kansas City; all told, Dixon again appeared in thirty regular season games over two seasons. The Rattlers, however, were in the midst of a dynasty when Dixon joined. In both of his seasons there (2013 and 2014, Arizona won the ArenaBowl.

In March 2015, Dixon was traded to the AFL's New Orleans Voodoo. After appearing in twelve games for New Orleans, Dixon was again traded; this time, his destination was the San Jose SaberCats. Dixon played a significant role in the SaberCats' 2015 playoff run. The SaberCats would eventually advance to (and win) ArenaBowl XXVIII; with the win, Dixon became one of only a handful of players to win three consecutive AFL championships.

On March 19, 2016, Dixon was assigned to the Los Angeles KISS. On June 15, 2016, Dixon was traded to the Tampa Bay Storm for claim order position. On June 21, 2016, the Storm activated Dixon.
