= Kurt Rocco =

American football player (born 1987)

No. 14
- Position: Quarterback

Personal information
- Born: October 8, 1987 (age 39); Cincinnati, Ohio, U.S.
- Listed height: 6 ft 5 in (1.96 m)
- Listed weight: 230 lb (104 kg)

Career information
- High school: Roger Bacon (St. Bernard, Ohio)
- College: Mount Union (2006–2009)
- NFL draft: 2010: undrafted

Career history
- Cleveland Gladiators (2011); New Orleans VooDoo (2012–2014)

Career AFL statistics
- Comp. / Att.: 1,012 / 1,702
- Passing yards: 13,227
- TD–INT: 267–62
- Passer rating: 108.05
- Rushing TD: 29
- Stats at ArenaFan.com

Kurt Rocco (born October 8, 1987) is an American former football quarterback who played for the Cleveland Gladiators and New Orleans VooDoo of the Arena Football League (AFL). He played college football at the University of Mount Union

== College career ==
Rocco attended the University of Mount Union in Alliance, Ohio. He was a starting quarterback for the Raiders, leading them to the 2009 NCAA Division III National Championship game. During his career, he threw for 42 touchdowns, 3,929 yards, and a completion percentage of 70.9.

== Professional career ==
=== Cleveland Gladiators ===
After going undrafted in the 2010 NFL draft, Rocco signed with the Cleveland Gladiators of the Arena Football League. He was the backup to John Dutton to begin the 2011 season, when Dutton tore his Achilles tendon in the team's season opener. Rocco had 72 passing and 13 rushing touchdowns, with a 112.64 quarterback rating, as he guided the Gladiators to the AFL East Division Championship, and a Playoff berth in 2011.

=== New Orleans VooDoo ===
Rocco was assigned to the New Orleans VooDoo for the 2012 season. He had his best career stats in 2012, with 107 passing and 7 rushing touchdowns, with a 115.40 quarterback rating, as he helped the VooDoo clinch an AFL Playoff berth in 2012. Rocco played two more seasons (2013–14), finishing his AFL career with the Voodoo in 2014.

- Rocco had a quarterback rating of 108.5 in his four seasons in the Arena Football League.

=== Statistics ===
Year	Team	Passing							Rushing		
Year	Team	Cmp	Att	Pct	Yds	TD	Int	Rtg	Att	Yds	TD
2011	Cleveland	319	495	64.4	3,834	72	14	112.64	49	132	13
2012	New Orleans	391	647	60.4	5,329	107	17	115.40	33	57	7
2013	New Orleans	167	305	54.8	2,305	49	18	94.19	28	10	4
2014	New Orleans	135	255	52.9	1,759	39	13	91.94	16	16	5
Career		1,012	1,702	59.5	13,227	267	62	108.05	126	215	29
