= 2014 Orlando Predators season =

Arena Football League team season

- Owner: Todd Boren; Pete DiPasqua; Dal Kim; Doug Long; Dr. Ken Vehec; Dr. Mike McHale; David Pearsall; Robert Schafer; Randy Wilds; Scott York; Steve Perry
- Head coach: Rob Keefe
- Home stadium: CFE Arena

Results
- Record: 11–7
- Division place: 1st AC South
- Playoffs: Won Conference Semifinal (Power) 56-48; Lost Conference Championship (Gladiators) 46-56

The 2014 Orlando Predators season was the 23rd season for the franchise in the Arena Football League. The team was coached by Rob Keefe, who was in his first season with the team. They played their home games at CFE Arena, located on the campus of the University of Central Florida, after Amway Center informed the team that they had defaulted on their lease with the arena for failing to meet attendance requirements.

== Standings ==
South Division
Team	W	L	PCT	PF	PA	DIV	CON	Home	Away
y-Orlando Predators	11	7	.611	1005	957	7–2	8–6	7–2	4–5
Tampa Bay Storm	8	10	.444	904	953	4–3	7–6	5–4	3–6
Jacksonville Sharks	7	11	.389	879	862	2–5	3–8	4–5	3–6
New Orleans VooDoo	3	15	.167	770	1011	2–5	2–12	1–8	2–7

y - Clinched division

== Schedule ==
=== Regular season ===
The Predators began the season by hosting the Jacksonville Sharks on March 16. Their final regular season game was on July 26, at home against the Arizona Rattlers.

Week	Day	Date	Kickoff	Opponent	Results		Location	Attendance	Report
Week	Day	Date	Kickoff	Opponent	Score	Record	Location	Attendance	Report
1	Sunday	March 16	4:00 p.m. EDT	Jacksonville Sharks	W 49–47	1–0	CFE Arena	4,893	
2	Friday	March 21	7:30 p.m. EDT	Los Angeles Kiss	W 69–63 (OT)	2–0	CFE Arena	5,312	
3	Saturday	March 29	7:30 p.m. EDT	at Tampa Bay Storm	W 56–52	3–0	Tampa Bay Times Forum	10,896	
4	Thursday	April 3	8:30 p.m. EDT	at New Orleans VooDoo	L 55–62	3–1	Smoothie King Center	4,740	
5	Thursday	April 10	7:30 p.m. EDT	Philadelphia Soul	L 56–69	3–2	CFE Arena	4,756	
6	Saturday	April 19	7:30 p.m. EDT	Tampa Bay Storm	W 77–65	4–2	CFE Arena	5,434	
7	Saturday	April 26	7:30 p.m. EDT	New Orleans VooDoo	W 63–48	5–2	CFE Arena	5,013	
8	Saturday	May 3	10:30 p.m. EDT	at San Jose SaberCats	L 35–70	5–3	SAP Center at San Jose	8,132	
9	Bye								
10	Saturday	May 17	7:00 p.m. EDT	at Jacksonville Sharks	W 57–50	6–3	Jacksonville Veterans Memorial Arena	9,459	
11	Saturday	May 24	7:30 p.m. EDT	Pittsburgh Power	L 61–62	6–4	CFE Arena	5,008	
12	Saturday	May 31	8:05 p.m. EDT	at Iowa Barnstormers	L 48–58	6–5	Wells Fargo Arena	7,442	
13	Saturday	June 7	8:00 p.m. EDT	at San Antonio Talons	L 58–39	7–5	Alamodome	6,237	
14	Thursday	June 12	7:30 p.m. EDT	Jacksonville Sharks	W 58–48	8–5	CFE Arena	4,789	
15	Saturday	June 21	7:30 p.m. EDT	at Tampa Bay Storm	L 34–35	8–6	Tampa Bay Times Forum	11,890	
16	Bye								
17	Monday	July 7	8:00 p.m. EDT	at Philadelphia Soul	L 35–42	8–7	Wells Fargo Center	7,069	
18	Monday	July 14	8:00 p.m. EDT	Iowa Barnstormers	W 66–33	9–7	CFE Arena	5,036	
19	Saturday	July 19	8:00 p.m. EDT	at New Orleans VooDoo	W 70–64 (OT)	10–7	Smoothie King Center	5,535	
20	Saturday	July 26	7:30 p.m. EDT	Arizona Rattlers	W 56–50	11–7	CFE Arena	8,550	

=== Playoffs ===
Round	Day	Date	Kickoff	Opponent	Results	Location	Attendance	Report
AC Semifinals	Sunday	August 3	2:00 p.m. EDT	Pittsburgh Power	W 56–48	CFE Arena	4,889	
AC Championship	Sunday	August 10	3:00 p.m. EDT	at Cleveland Gladiators	L 46–56	Quicken Loans Arena	14,543	

== Final roster ==
2014 Orlando Predators roster
Quarterbacks: 11 Jason Boltus; 5 Bernard Morris; Fullbacks: Currently vacant; Wide receivers: 1 Larry Brackins; 4 Greg Carr; 17 Michael Rios; 15 Kendal Thompkins; 83 Gerald Young	Offensive linemen: 60 Terrence Campbell; 74 Bryan Collins; 75 Hayworth Hicks; 74 Justin Wells; 54 Zack Williams; Defensive linemen: 10 Michael Janac; 9 Earl Okine; 98 Ko Quaye; 44 Mark Robinson	Linebackers: 20 Tanner Varner; 49 Meshak Williams; Defensive backs: 26 Tracy Belton; 23 Erick McIntosh; 8 Eddie Moten; 6 Anthony Shutt; 25 Dee Webb; Kickers: 16 Christian Reed	Injured reserve: -- Marcus Everett LB; 5 Arness Ikner DB; Refuse to Report: -- Matt Marcorelle DL; Other league exempt: -- LaMark Brown WR; 3 T. J. Fatinikun LB; 2 Khalil Paden WR; 52 Michael Simons OL; League suspension: -- Devin Clark OL; -- Theo Goins DL; -- Brian Jackson K; -- Marlon Moye-Moore FB; 91 Prentice Purnell DL; -- Jermaine Saffold WR; -- Trevis Turner OL; Inactive reserve: 8 O'Hara Fluellen DB; Emergency hold: 18 Mark Lewis K; Recallable reassignment: Currently vacant; Rookies in italics Roster updated August 12, 2014; 24 Active, 16 Inactive → More rosters
