= 2014 Jacksonville Sharks season =

Arena Football League team season

- Head coach: Les Moss
- Home stadium: Jacksonville Veterans Memorial Arena

Results
- Record: 7–11
- Division place: 3rd AC South
- Playoffs: Did not qualify

The 2014 Jacksonville Sharks season was the fifth season for the franchise in the Arena Football League. The team was coached by Les Moss and played their home games at Jacksonville Veterans Memorial Arena. Finishing with a 7–11 record, this was the first season in the franchise's history that the team not only failed reach the playoffs, but also failed to win the division.

== Standings ==
South Division
| Team | W | L | PCT | PF | PA | DIV | CON | Home | Away |
| y-Orlando Predators | 11 | 7 | .611 | 1005 | 957 | 7–2 | 8–6 | 7–2 | 4–5 |
| Tampa Bay Storm | 8 | 10 | .444 | 904 | 953 | 4–3 | 7–6 | 5–4 | 3–6 |
| Jacksonville Sharks | 7 | 11 | .389 | 879 | 862 | 2–5 | 3–8 | 4–5 | 3–6 |
| New Orleans VooDoo | 3 | 15 | .167 | 770 | 1011 | 2–5 | 2–12 | 1–8 | 2–7 |

y - Clinched division

== Schedule ==
The Sharks began the season by visiting the Orlando Predators on March 16. Their final regular season game was at home against the Los Angeles Kiss on July 26.

| Week | Day | Date | Kickoff | Opponent | Results | | Location | Attendance | Report |
| Week | Day | Date | Kickoff | Opponent | Score | Record | Location | Attendance | Report |
|---|---|---|---|---|---|---|---|---|---|
| 1 | Sunday | March 16 | 4:00 p.m. EDT | at Orlando Predators | L 47–49 | 0–1 | CFE Arena | 4,893 | |
| 2 | Bye | | | | | | | | |
| 3 | Saturday | March 29 | 7:00 p.m. EDT | San Antonio Talons | W 63–22 | 1–1 | Jacksonville Veterans Memorial Arena | 10,144 | |
| 4 | Saturday | April 5 | 9:00 p.m. EDT | at Arizona Rattlers | L 38–63 | 1–2 | US Airways Center | 8,586 | |
| 5 | Friday | April 11 | 8:00 p.m. EDT | Tampa Bay Storm | W 60–41 | 2–2 | Jacksonville Veterans Memorial Arena | 8,132 | |
| 6 | Saturday | April 19 | 6:00 p.m. EDT | at Philadelphia Soul | L 41–54 | 2–3 | Wells Fargo Center | 12,311 | |
| 7 | Saturday | April 26 | 7:00 p.m. EDT | Portland Thunder | L 62–69 | 2–4 | Jacksonville Veterans Memorial Arena | 8,679 | |
| 8 | Saturday | May 3 | 7:00 p.m. EDT | Arizona Rattlers | L 61–70 | 2–5 | Jacksonville Veterans Memorial Arena | 9,732 | |
| 9 | Saturday | May 10 | 8:05 p.m. EDT | at Iowa Barnstormers | W 68–48 | 3–5 | Wells Fargo Arena | 7,276 | |
| 10 | Saturday | May 17 | 7:00 p.m. EDT | Orlando Predators | L 50–57 | 3–6 | Jacksonville Veterans Memorial Arena | 9,459 | |
| 11 | Saturday | May 24 | 7:30 p.m. EDT | at Tampa Bay Storm | L 35–56 | 3–7 | Tampa Bay Times Forum | 12,501 | |
| 12 | Bye | | | | | | | | |
| 13 | Saturday | June 7 | 7:00 p.m. EDT | Spokane Shock | W 34–28 | 4–7 | Jacksonville Veterans Memorial Arena | 9,401 | |
| 14 | Thursday | June 12 | 7:30 p.m. EDT | at Orlando Predators | L 48–58 | 4–8 | CFE Arena | 4,789 | |
| 15 | Saturday | June 21 | 8:00 p.m. EDT | at New Orleans VooDoo | W 54–13 | 5–8 | Smoothie King Center | 5,243 | |
| 16 | Saturday | June 28 | 7:00 p.m. EDT | Pittsburgh Power | L 48–64 | 5–9 | Jacksonville Veterans Memorial Arena | 9,304 | |
| 17 | Saturday | July 5 | 8:00 p.m. EDT | at San Antonio Talons | W 62–34 | 6–9 | Alamodome | 5,212 | |
| 18 | Saturday | July 12 | 7:00 p.m. EDT | New Orleans VooDoo | L 35–36 | 6–10 | Jacksonville Veterans Memorial Arena | 8,960 | |
| 19 | Saturday | July 19 | 7:00 p.m. EDT | at Cleveland Gladiators | L 20–62 | 6–11 | Quicken Loans Arena | 13,064 | |
| 20 | Saturday | July 26 | 7:00 p.m. EDT | Los Angeles Kiss | W 53–36 | 7–11 | Jacksonville Veterans Memorial Arena | 11,084 | |

== Roster ==
2014 Jacksonville Sharks roster
| Quarterbacks: 12 R.J. Archer; 14 Lee Chapple; Fullbacks: 31 R. J. Bibbs; 20 Jared McGriff-Culver; Wide receivers: 3 Jeron Harvey; 5 Jeff Hughley; 19 Maurice Williams; 15 Jomo Wilson | Offensive linemen: 77 Emmanuel Akah; 48 Brant Clouser; 78 Chris Jamison; 74 Cornelius Lewis; 66 Isaac Morales; Defensive linemen: 45 Rashaad Duncan; 95 James McClinton; 9 Justin Parrish; 56 Jerry Turner | Linebackers: 4 Charlie Hunt; 0 Aaron Robbins; Defensive backs: 5 Xavier Brewer; 21 Brodrick Brown; 34 Keiron Jones; 1 Micheaux Robinson; Kickers: 11 Fabrizio Scaccia | Injured reserve: 2 London Crawford WR; 6 Charles Gilbert WR; 22 Shamar Graves WR; 10 Terrance Smith DB; Refused to report: -- Vic Hall DB; -- Keenan Mace DL; -- Bert Reed WR; Other League Exempt: -- Alex Carder QB; -- Mardy Gilyard WR; -- Caesar Rayford DL; Team suspension: Currently vacant; Inactive reserve: 92 Reggie Paramoure DL; League suspension: Currently vacant; Recallable reassignment: Currently vacant; Rookies in italics Roster updated July 17, 2014; 24 Active, 11 Inactive → More rosters |
