= Mario Johnson =

American football player (born 1970)

No. 78, 98
- Position: Defensive tackle

Personal information
- Born: January 30, 1970 (age 56); St. Louis, Missouri, U.S.
- Listed height: 6 ft 3 in (1.91 m)
- Listed weight: 292 lb (132 kg)

Career information
- High school: Hazelwood Central (Florissant, Missouri)
- College: Missouri (1988–1991)
- NFL draft: 1992: 10th round, 266th overall pick

Career history
- New York Jets (1992–1993); New England Patriots (1993); Cleveland Browns (1994–1995)*
- * Offseason or practice squad member only
- Stats at Pro Football Reference

Mario Chavez Johnson Jr. (born January 30, 1970) is an American former professional football defensive tackle who played in the National Football League (NFL) with the New York Jets and New England Patriots. He played college football for the Missouri Tigers and was selected by the Jets in the tenth round of the 1992 NFL draft.

== Early life ==
Mario Chavez Johnson Jr. was born on January 30, 1970, in St. Louis, Missouri. He played high school football at Hazelwood Central in Florissant, Missouri. He earned USA Today All-USA High School Football Team honors in 1987.

== College career ==
In February 1988, Johnson committed to the University of Missouri to play college football for the Tigers, joining his brother Lee. He was later ruled academically ineligible for the 1988 season, and was a three-year letterman from 1989 to 1991.

== Professional career ==
Johnson was selected by the New York Jets in the tenth round, with the 266th overall pick, of the 1992 NFL draft. He signed with the team on July 23. He played in 14 games for the Jets during the 1992 season as a reserve defensive tackle and posted two sacks. Johnson was waived on September 22, 1993, after not playing in the first two games of the 1993 season.

Johnson was claimed off waivers by the New England Patriots on September 23, 1993. He played in six games for the Patriots in 1993 as a backup defensive tackle. He was later released on July 17, 1994.

Johnson signed with the Cleveland Browns on July 20, 1994. He was released on August 28, 1994, re-signed on April 17, 1995, and released again on July 19, 1995.
