= 2014 Portland Thunder season =

Arena Football League team season

- Owner: Terry Emmert
- Head coach: Matthew Sauk
- Home stadium: Moda Center

Results
- Record: 5–13
- Division place: 3rd NC Pacific
- Playoffs: Lost NC Semifinals (Rattlers) 48–52

The 2014 Portland Thunder season was the inaugural season for the franchise in the Arena Football League. The team was coached by Matthew Sauk and played its home games at the Moda Center. With a 5–13 record in the regular season, the Thunder qualified for the playoffs. However, they were defeated in the conference semifinals by the Arizona Rattlers by a 52–48 score.

== Standings ==
Pacific Division
Team	W	L	PCT	PF	PA	DIV	CON	Home	Away
y-San Jose SaberCats	13	5	.722	999	723	5–1	9–3	7–2	6–3
x-Spokane Shock	11	7	.588	957	843	4–2	8–4	6–3	5–4
x-Portland Thunder	5	13	.278	816	965	0–6	2–11	3–6	2–7

x - Clinched playoff berth
y - Clinched division

== Schedule ==
=== Regular season ===
The Thunder's inaugural game took place on March 17, at home against the San Jose SaberCats. The team hosted the Spokane Shock in its last regular season game on July 26.

Week	Day	Date	Kickoff	Opponent	Results		Location	Attendance	Report
Week	Day	Date	Kickoff	Opponent	Score	Record	Location	Attendance	Report
1	Monday	March 17	7:00 p.m. PDT	San Jose SaberCats	L 34–64	0–1	Moda Center	8,509	
2	Monday	March 24	7:00 p.m PDT	Iowa Barnstormers	L 36–40	0–2	Moda Center	6,521	
3	Bye								
4	Saturday	April 5	7:00 p.m. PDT	at Los Angeles Kiss	L 34–44	0–3	Honda Center	12,045	
5	Saturday	April 12	7:00 p.m. PDT	at Spokane Shock	L 27–55	0–4	Spokane Veterans Memorial Arena	8,652	
6	Friday	April 18	7:00 p.m. PDT	San Jose SaberCats	L 32–38	0–5	Moda Center	9,075	
7	Saturday	April 26	4:00 p.m. PDT	at Jacksonville Sharks	W 69–62	1–5	Jacksonville Veterans Memorial Arena	8,679	
8	Saturday	May 3	4:30 p.m. PDT	at Tampa Bay Storm	W 61–42	2–5	Tampa Bay Times Forum	10,584	
9	Saturday	May 10	7:00 p.m. PDT	Arizona Rattlers	L 32–61	2–6	Moda Center	8,863	
10	Saturday	May 17	7:30 p.m. PDT	at San Jose SaberCats	L 27–64	2–7	SAP Center at San Jose	8,243	
11	Thursday	May 22	7:00 p.m. PDT	San Antonio Talons	W 55–40	3–7	Moda Center	6,396	
12	Friday	May 30	7:00 p.m. PDT	at Spokane Shock	L 48–58	3–8	Spokane Veterans Memorial Arena	8,535	
13	Friday	June 6	7:00 p.m. PDT	Arizona Rattlers	L 59–70	3–9	Moda Center	8,292	
14	Saturday	June 14	7:00 p.m. PDT	at Los Angeles Kiss	L 61–69	3–10	Honda Center	10,980	
15	Bye								
16	Thursday	June 26	7:00 p.m. PDT	New Orleans VooDoo	W 62–56	4–10	Moda Center	7,969	
17	Saturday	July 5	3:00 p.m. PDT	at Cleveland Gladiators	L 40–61	4–11	Quicken Loans Arena	9,840	
18	Saturday	July 12	7:00 p.m. PDT	Los Angeles Kiss	W 44–31	5–11	Moda Center	8,802	
19	Sunday	July 20	3:00 p.m. PDT	at Arizona Rattlers	L 55–65	5–12	US Airways Center	13,120	
20	Saturday	July 26	7:00 p.m. PDT	Spokane Shock	L 40–45	5–13	Moda Center	12,848	

=== Playoffs ===
Round	Day	Date	Kickoff	Opponent	Results	Location	Attendance	Report
NC Semifinals	Sunday	August 3	3:00 p.m. PDT	at Arizona Rattlers	L 48–52	US Airways Center	6,753	

== Roster ==
2014 Portland Thunder roster
Quarterbacks: 6 Kyle Rowley; 1 Darron Thomas; Fullbacks: 72 Brandon Lockheart; 28 Dustin Risseeuw; Wide receivers: 9 Braylon Bell; 4 Duane Brooks; 9 Kevin Cummings; 5 Jamar Howard; 8 Douglas McNeil III; 14 Jeffrey Soloman	Offensive linemen: 66 Stanley Daniels; 50 Abe Markowitz; 71 John Martinez; 69 Aderious Simmons; Defensive linemen: 3 Antron Dillon; 18 K. C. Obi; 11 Donte Paige-Moss; 32 Brandon Tett	Linebackers: 93 Marquis Jackson; Defensive backs: 2 Eric Crocker; 21 Dwight McLean; 16 Okechukwu Okoroha; 20 Bryce Peila; 24 Varmah Sonie; Kickers: 23 Zach Ramirez	Injured Reserve: 70 John Collins OL; 74 Max Jean-Gilles OL; 15 Alvance Robinson WR; 70 Nick Torresso FB; Refused to report: -- Sioeli Fakalata OL; -- Dion Turner DB; Other League Exempt: 50 Jeraill McCuller OL; 99 Jake McDonough DL; 13 Eric Rogers WR; -- Jason Slowey OL; League Suspension: 15 Nathan Enderle QB; 23 Coryell Judie DB; -- James Kirkendoll WR; -- Brian Smith DB; 7 Danny Southwick QB; -- Dontel Watkins WR; Team Suspension: Currently vacant; Recallable reassignment: Currently vacant; Rookies in italics Roster updated July 31, 2014; 24 Active, 16 Inactive → More rosters
