= 2014 San Jose SaberCats season =

Arena Football League team season

- Head coach: Darren Arbet
- Home stadium: SAP Center at San Jose

Results
- Record: 13–5
- Division place: 1st NC Pacific
- Playoffs: Won conference semifinals (Shock) 55–28; Lost Conference Championship (Arizona Rattlers) 56–72
- Team DPY: Jason Stewart

The 2014 San Jose SaberCats season was the 18th season for the franchise in the Arena Football League. The team was coached by Darren Arbet and played their home games at the SAP Center at San Jose. The team was led by its league-best defense, which held eleven of its eighteen regular-season opponents to fewer than 40 points.

== Standings ==
Pacific Division
Team	W	L	PCT	PF	PA	DIV	CON	Home	Away
y-San Jose SaberCats	13	5	.722	999	723	5–1	9–3	7–2	6–3
x-Spokane Shock	11	7	.588	957	843	4–2	8–4	6–3	5–4
x-Portland Thunder	5	13	.278	816	965	0–6	2–11	3–6	2–7

x - Clinched playoff berth
y - Clinched division

== Schedule ==
=== Regular season ===
The SaberCats began the season on the road against the Portland Thunder on March 17. They played their last regular season game on the road against the Iowa Barnstormers on July 26.

Week	Day	Date	Kickoff	Opponent	Results		Location	Attendance	Report
Week	Day	Date	Kickoff	Opponent	Score	Record	Location	Attendance	Report
1	Monday	March 17	7:00 p.m. PDT	at Portland Thunder	W 64–34	1–0	Moda Center	8,509	
2	Friday	March 21	7:30 p.m PDT	Philadelphia Soul	W 70–33	2–0	SAP Center at San Jose	10,721	
3	Saturday	March 29	2:00 p.m. PDT	at Pittsburgh Power	L 47–48	2–1	Consol Energy Center	4,309	
4	Friday	April 4	7:30 p.m. PDT	Spokane Shock	L 62–73	2–2	SAP Center at San Jose	7,215	
5	Saturday	April 12	7:30 p.m. PDT	Arizona Rattlers	L 51–57	2–3	SAP Center at San Jose	9,123	
6	Friday	April 18	7:00 p.m. PDT	at Portland Thunder	W 38–32	3–3	Moda Center	9,075	
7	Saturday	April 26	7:00 p.m. PDT	at Los Angeles Kiss	W 48–32	4–3	Honda Center	10,569	
8	Saturday	May 3	7:30 p.m. PDT	Orlando Predators	W 70–35	5–3	SAP Center at San Jose	8,132	
9	Bye								
10	Saturday	May 17	7:00 p.m. PDT	Portland Thunder	W 64–27	6–3	SAP Center at San Jose	8,243	
11	Friday	May 23	7:00 p.m. PDT	at Spokane Shock	W 52–34	7–3	Spokane Veterans Memorial Arena	8,579	
12	Saturday	May 31	6:00 p.m. PDT	at Arizona Rattlers	L 42–51	7–4	US Airways Center	12,094	
13	Saturday	June 7	7:30 p.m. PDT	Los Angeles Kiss	W 63–35	8–4	SAP Center at San Jose	8,637	
14	Saturday	June 14	7:30 p.m. PDT	Spokane Shock	W 47–37	9–4	SAP Center at San Jose	8,263	
15	Bye								
16	Friday	June 27	7:30 p.m. PDT	Arizona Rattlers	W 62–33	10–4	SAP Center at San Jose	7,373	
17	Sunday	July 6	7:00 p.m. PDT	at Los Angeles Kiss	W 75–34	11–4	Honda Center	10,677	
18	Friday	June 11	7:30 p.m. PDT	Tampa Bay Storm	W 52–43	12–4	SAP Center at San Jose	8,645	
19	Sunday	July 20	1:00 p.m. PDT	at Philadelphia Soul	L 20–42	12–5	Wells Fargo Center	10,471	
20	Saturday	July 26	5:05 p.m. PDT	at Iowa Barnstormers	W 72–43	13–5	Wells Fargo Arena	8,051	

=== Playoffs ===
Round	Day	Date	Kickoff	Opponent	Results	Location	Attendance	Report
NC Semifinals	Saturday	August 2	7:00 p.m. PDT	Spokane Shock	W 55–28	SAP Center at San Jose	11,333	
NC Championship	Sunday	August 10	5:00 p.m. PDT	at Arizona Rattlers	L 56–72	US Airways Center	8,581	

== Final roster ==
2014 San Jose SaberCats roster
Quarterbacks: 12 Russ Michna; 10 Nathan Stanley; Fullbacks: 32 Odie Armstrong; Wide receivers: 18 Dominique Curry; 1 Reggie Gray; 25 Trandon Harvey; 80 Ben Nelson; 7 Jason Willis	Offensive linemen: 68 George Bussey; 54 Kimani Jones; 57 Elliott Mealer; 64 Rich Ranglin; 72 Duke Robinson; 73 T. J. Watkins; Defensive linemen: 23 Terrance Carter; 99 Jason Stewart; 11 Trumaine Sykes; 36 Luis Vasquez	Linebackers: 98 Francis Maka; Defensive backs: 22 Demar Dorsey; 5 Ken Fontenette; 3 David Hyland; 24 Kenny Okoro; 8 Clevan Thomas; Kickers: 4 Nich Pertuit	Injured reserve: 21 Simeon Castille DB; 76 Ray Feinga OL; 40 Rodney Fritz DL; 69 Dennis Godfrey OL; 13 Rod Harper WR; 70 Jordan Mudge OL; 95 Ernest Owusu DL; 56 Randy Richards OL; 19 Nick Stephens QB; 17 Huey Whittaker WR; 15 Doug Williams WR; 11 Jarvis Williams WR; League suspension: -- Jason Heath FB; -- Kyle Jenkins DL; -- Roosevelt Kirk DL; 74 Jeff Nady OL; -- Micanor Regis DL; 62 Jared Singleton OL; -- John Steel OL; Refuse to report: 96 Dimetrio Tyson DL	Other league exempt: 47 Brian Folkerts FB; -- Monte Lewis DL; 15 Fred Williams WR; Inactive Reserve: 34 J. J. Payne FB; 94 Marc Schiechl DL; Recallable reassignment: Currently vacant; Rookies in italics Roster updated August 8, 2014; 25 Active, 23 Inactive
