= 2014 Philadelphia Soul season =

Arena Football League team season

- Head coach: Clint Dolezel
- Home stadium: Wells Fargo Center

Results
- Record: 9–9
- Division place: 3rd AC East
- Playoffs: Lost Conference semifinals (Gladiators) 37–39

The 2014 Philadelphia Soul season was the ninth season for the franchise in the Arena Football League. The team was coached by Clint Dolezel and played their home games at the Wells Fargo Center. The Soul finished the regular season 9–9, which was good enough for a playoff berth. However, they were eliminated in the first round by the Cleveland Gladiators on a field goal as time expired, losing by a score of 39–37.

== Standings ==
East Division
Team	W	L	PCT	PF	PA	DIV	CON	Home	Away
z-Cleveland Gladiators	17	1	.944	991	782	7–1	12–1	9–0	8–1
x-Pittsburgh Power	15	3	.833	1015	778	6–2	11–2	8–1	7–2
x-Philadelphia Soul	9	9	.500	1021	949	2–5	7–7	7–2	2–7
Iowa Barnstormers	6	12	.333	848	1046	0–7	2–10	3–6	3–6

x - Clinched playoff berth
z - Clinched division and conference's best record

== Schedule ==
=== Regular season ===
The Soul began the season with a rematch of ArenaBowl XXVI on the road against the Arizona Rattlers on March 15. Their final regular season game was on July 26 against the Pittsburgh Power on the road.

Week	Day	Date	Kickoff	Opponent	Results		Location	Attendance	Report
Week	Day	Date	Kickoff	Opponent	Score	Record	Location	Attendance	Report
1	Saturday	March 15	9:00 p.m. EDT	at Arizona Rattlers	L 55–62 (OT)	0–1	US Airways Center	9,493	
2	Friday	March 23	10:30 p.m. EDT	at San Jose SaberCats	L 33–70	0–2	SAP Center at San Jose	10,721	
3	Bye								
4	Friday	April 4	7:30 p.m. EDT	at Tampa Bay Storm	L 49–63	0–3	Tampa Bay Times Forum	11,102	
5	Thursday	April 10	7:30 p.m. EDT	at Orlando Predators	W 69–56	1–3	CFE Arena	4,756	
6	Saturday	April 19	6:00 p.m. EDT	Jacksonville Sharks	W 54–41	2–3	Wells Fargo Center	12,311	
7	Sunday	April 27	4:00 p.m. EDT	Iowa Barnstormers	W 60–55	3–3	Wells Fargo Center	10,062	
8	Saturday	May 3	7:00 p.m. EDT	at Pittsburgh Power	L 57–65	3–4	Consol Energy Center	5,321	
9	Saturday	May 10	6:00 p.m. EDT	New Orleans VooDoo	W 79–60	4–4	Wells Fargo Center	6,080	
10	Saturday	May 17	6:00 p.m. EDT	Tampa Bay Storm	W 62–34	5–4	Wells Fargo Center	8,058	
11	Friday	May 23	7:00 p.m. EDT	at Cleveland Gladiators	L 52–54	5–5	Quicken Loans Arena	10,659	
12	Saturday	May 31	6:00 p.m. EDT	San Antonio Talons	W 76–40	6–5	Wells Fargo Center	7,811	
13	Friday	June 6	7:30 p.m. EDT	Tampa Bay Storm	L 49–56	6–6	Tampa Bay Times Forum	11,062	
14	Saturday	June 14	6:00 p.m. EDT	Pittsburgh Power	L 56–57	6–7	Wells Fargo Center	7,804	
15	Saturday	June 21	6:00 p.m. EDT	Cleveland Gladiators	L 68–69	6–8	Wells Fargo Center	8,033	
16	Saturday	June 28	8:05 p.m. EDT	at Iowa Barnstormers	W 84–48	7–8	Wells Fargo Arena	9,551	
17	Monday	July 7	8:00 p.m. EDT	Orlando Predators	W 42–35	8–8	Wells Fargo Center	7,069	
18	Bye								
19	Sunday	July 20	4:00 p.m. EDT	San Jose SaberCats	W 42–20	9–8	Wells Fargo Center	10,471	
20	Saturday	July 26	5:00 p.m. EDT	at Pittsburgh Power	L 34–64	9–9	Consol Energy Center	9,549	

=== Playoffs ===
Round	Day	Date	Kickoff	Opponent	Results	Location	Report
AC Semifinals	Saturday	August 2	7:00 p.m. EDT	at Cleveland Gladiators	L 37–39	Quicken Loans Arena	

== Roster ==
2014 Philadelphia Soul roster
Quarterbacks: 9 Bryan Randall; 5 Dan Raudabaugh; Fullbacks: 4 Derrick Ross; Wide receivers: 83 Harvey Binford; 11 Tiger Jones; 2 V'Keon Lacey; 15 Emery Sammons; 88 Markee White	Offensive linemen: 52 Ryan Blaszczyk; 47 Jason Holman; 78 Christian Johnson; 76 Adam Smith; Defensive linemen: 92 Calvin Fance; 12 Bryan Robinson	Linebackers: 18 Joe Goosby; 6 Brandon Perkins; 90 Jerome Williams; Defensive backs: 7 Rayshaun Kizer; 24 Ray Little; 8 Kent Richardson; 25 James Romain; 23 LaRico Stevenson; Kicker: 1 Jon Striefsky	Injured reserve: 99 Morkeith Brown DL; 55 Brennen Carvalho C; 97 Chauncey DeBose DL; 94 Tyron Hurst DL; 3 Carlos Martinez K; 19 Ryan McDaniel WR; -- Neal Tivis OL; 97 Julius Williams DL; League suspension: 24 Carlos Campbell DB; 8 T. J. Langley DL; 15 Robert Redd WR; 69 Wayne Tribue OL; -- Justin Young DL; Other League Exempt: -- Maurice Leggett DB; Inactive reserve: 98 Ted Jennings DL; 13 Padric Scott DL; Refuse to Report: -- Pernell Phillips DL; Recallable reassignment: Currently vacant; Rookies in italics Roster updated July 31, 2014; 23 Active, 17 Inactive → More rosters
