= 2014 Tampa Bay Storm season =

Arena Football League season

- Head coach: Lawrence Samuels
- Home stadium: Tampa Bay Times Forum

Results
- Record: 8–10
- Division place: 2nd AC South
- Playoffs: Did not qualify

The 2014 Tampa Bay Storm season was the 27th season for the franchise in the Arena Football League, and their 23rd in the Tampa Bay area. The team was coached by Lawrence Samuels, following his promotion from offensive coordinator. They played their home games at the Tampa Bay Times Forum. Finishing the regular season with an 8–10 record, the Storm failed to reach the playoffs for the third time in four seasons.

== Standings ==
South Division
| Team | W | L | PCT | PF | PA | DIV | CON | Home | Away |
| y-Orlando Predators | 11 | 7 | .611 | 1005 | 957 | 7–2 | 8–6 | 7–2 | 4–5 |
| Tampa Bay Storm | 8 | 10 | .444 | 904 | 953 | 4–3 | 7–6 | 5–4 | 3–6 |
| Jacksonville Sharks | 7 | 11 | .389 | 879 | 862 | 2–5 | 3–8 | 4–5 | 3–6 |
| New Orleans VooDoo | 3 | 15 | .167 | 770 | 1011 | 2–5 | 2–12 | 1–8 | 2–7 |

y - Clinched division

== Schedule ==
The Storm began the season by hosting the New Orleans VooDoo on March 14. They ended the regular season at home against the Cleveland Gladiators.

| Week | Day | Date | Kickoff | Opponent | Results | | Location | Attendance | Report |
| Week | Day | Date | Kickoff | Opponent | Score | Record | Location | Attendance | Report |
|---|---|---|---|---|---|---|---|---|---|
| 1 | Friday | March 14 | 7:30 p.m. EDT | New Orleans VooDoo | W 62–57 | 1–0 | Tampa Bay Times Forum | 10,370 | |
| 2 | Friday | March 21 | 8:30 p.m. EDT | at San Antonio Talons | W 48–45 | 2–0 | Alamodome | 5,981 | |
| 3 | Saturday | March 29 | 7:30 p.m. EDT | Orlando Predators | L 52–56 | 2–1 | Tampa Bay Times Forum | 10,896 | |
| 4 | Friday | April 4 | 7:30 p.m. EDT | Philadelphia Soul | W 63–49 | 3–1 | Tampa Bay Times Forum | 11,102 | |
| 5 | Friday | April 11 | 8:00 p.m. EDT | at Jacksonville Sharks | L 41–60 | 3–2 | Jacksonville Veterans Memorial Arena | 8,132 | |
| 6 | Saturday | April 19 | 7:30 p.m. EDT | at Orlando Predators | L 65–77 | 3–3 | CFE Arena | 5,434 | |
| 7 | Saturday | April 26 | 7:30 p.m. EDT | Spokane Shock | L 41–53 | 3–4 | Tampa Bay Times Forum | 9,448 | |
| 8 | Saturday | May 3 | 7:30 p.m. EDT | Portland Thunder | L 42–61 | 3–5 | Tampa Bay Times Forum | 10,584 | |
| 9 | Bye | | | | | | | | |
| 10 | Saturday | May 17 | 6:00 p.m. EDT | at Philadelphia Soul | L 34–62 | 3–6 | Wells Fargo Center | 8,058 | |
| 11 | Saturday | May 24 | 7:30 p.m. EDT | Jacksonville Sharks | W 56–35 | 4–6 | Tampa Bay Times Forum | 12,501 | |
| 12 | Friday | May 30 | 8:30 p.m. EDT | at New Orleans VooDoo | W 62–48 | 5–6 | Smoothie King Center | 4,853 | |
| 13 | Friday | June 6 | 7:30 p.m. EDT | Philadelphia Soul | W 56–49 | 6–6 | Tampa Bay Times Forum | 11,062 | |
| 14 | Saturday | June 14 | 8:05 p.m. EDT | at Iowa Barnstormers | W 62–56 (OT) | 7–6 | Wells Fargo Arena | 8,862 | |
| 15 | Saturday | June 21 | 7:30 p.m. EDT | Orlando Predators | W 35–34 | 8–6 | Tampa Bay Times Forum | 11,890 | |
| 16 | Friday | June 27 | 7:00 p.m. EDT | at Cleveland Gladiators | L 41–48 | 8–7 | Quicken Loans Arena | 10,855 | |
| 17 | Bye | | | | | | | | |
| 18 | Friday | July 11 | 10:30 p.m. EDT | at San Jose SaberCats | L 43–52 | 8–8 | SAP Center at San Jose | 8,645 | |
| 19 | Monday | July 22 | 8:30 p.m. EDT | at Spokane Shock | L 52–55 | 8–9 | Spokane Veterans Memorial Arena | 9,479 | |
| 20 | Saturday | July 26 | 7:30 p.m. EDT | Cleveland Gladiators | L 49–56 | 8–10 | Tampa Bay Times Forum | 14,770 | |

== Roster ==
2014 Tampa Bay Storm roster
| Quarterbacks: 3 Chris Dixon; 17 Randy Hippeard; Fullbacks: Currently vacant; Wide receivers: 2 Joe Hills; 11 Amarri Jackson; 10 Michael Lindsey; 1 T. T. Toliver | Offensive linemen: 75 Mario Henderson; 68 Byron Isom; 54 Lawrence Martin; 52 Alfred McCullough; 50 Raymond McNeil; Defensive linemen: 93 Richard Clebert; 77 Tommie Duhart; 90 Julius Forte; 99 Ishmyl Johnson; 98 Jammie Kirlew | Linebackers: 55 Dexter Jackson; 23 Darian Payne; Defensive backs: 15 Randall Burden; 21 Jean Fanor; 31 James Harrell; 6 Rod Issac; Kickers: 9 Juan Bongarra | Injured reserve: 56 Rodney Beamon LB; 53 Matt Hardison DL; 92 Uriah Grant DL; 77 Carl Johnson OL; 4 Sammuel Lamur QB; 8 Terrence Mitchell DB; 84 Sam Tranks WR; Refuse to report: Currently vacant; Other League Exempt: 82 Greg Ellingson WR; 4 Chris Smith DB; League suspension: -- Junior Aumavae DL; 9 Chris Davis WR; -- Jermarcus Hardrick TE; -- Jerrell Young DB; Team suspension: 81 Justin Hilton WR; Inactive reserve: Currently vacant; Rookies in itlatics Roster updated July 17, 2014; 24 Active, 13 Inactive → More rosters |
