= Tysson Poots =

American football player (born 1988)

No. 19
- Position: Wide receiver

Personal information
- Born: January 12, 1988 (age 38); Des Moines, Iowa, U.S.
- Listed height: 6 ft 2 in (1.88 m)
- Listed weight: 220 lb (100 kg)

Career information
- High school: Coronado (Henderson, Nevada)
- College: Southern Utah
- NFL draft: 2011: undrafted

Career history
- Dallas Cowboys (2011)*; Utah Blaze (2011–2012); Virginia Destroyers (2012); Arizona Rattlers (2013–2014); Las Vegas Outlaws (2015)
- * Offseason or practice squad member only

Awards and highlights
- 2× ArenaBowl champion (2013, 2014)

Career AFL statistics
- Receptions: 290
- Receiving yards: 3,365
- Receiving touchdowns: 84
- Total tackles: 48.5
- Stats at ArenaFan.com

Tysson Poots (born January 12, 1988) is an American former professional football wide receiver. He was signed by the Dallas Cowboys as an undrafted free agent.

== Early life ==
Poots played high school football at Coronado High School in Henderson, Nevada. He was a two-time All-Statewide receiver. He finished his career with a total 2,014 receiving yards, 270 tackles, 19 sacks and 8 interceptions.

Poots also lettered in basketball & nominee of McDonald's All-American.

== College career ==
Poots had a career total of 43 touchdowns and 3,970 yards. He was named as a Great West Conference all conference receiver in three of his four seasons with the Thunderbirds. He was a Walter Payton camp nominee. Poots was inducted into the Southern Utah Athletics Hall of Fame in 2021.

== Professional career ==
Poots went undrafted in the 2011 NFL draft, Poots had a tryout with the Baltimore Ravens in late July 2011 but was not signed. He was signed by the Dallas Cowboys as an undrafted free agent on August 1, 2011. Poots was released during final cuts.

Poots was assigned to the Utah Blaze of the Arena Football League (AFL) on September 30, 2011.

Poots spent time with the Virginia Destroyers of the United Football League in 2012.

Poots was assigned to the Arizona Rattlers of the AFL in 2013, helping the Rattlers advance to ArenaBowl XXVI against the Philadelphia Soul. Poots had a 14-yard touchdown reception in the ArenaBowl.

On February 19, 2015, Poots was assigned to the AFL's Las Vegas Outlaws.
