= 2014 Spokane Shock season =

Arena Football League team season

- Head coach: Andy Olson
- Home stadium: Spokane Veterans Memorial Arena

Results
- Record: 11–7
- Division place: 2nd NC Pacific
- Playoffs: Lost conference semifinals (SaberCats) 28–55

The 2014 Spokane Shock season was the ninth season for the franchise, and their fifth in the Arena Football League. The team was coached by Andy Olson and played their home games at the Spokane Veterans Memorial Arena. With an 11–7 regular season record, the Shock advanced to the playoffs. However, they were defeated in the conference semifinals by the San Jose SaberCats by a 55–28 score.

== Standings ==
Pacific Division
| Team | W | L | PCT | PF | PA | DIV | CON | Home | Away |
| y-San Jose SaberCats | 13 | 5 | .722 | 999 | 723 | 5–1 | 9–3 | 7–2 | 6–3 |
| x-Spokane Shock | 11 | 7 | .588 | 957 | 843 | 4–2 | 8–4 | 6–3 | 5–4 |
| x-Portland Thunder | 5 | 13 | .278 | 816 | 965 | 0–6 | 2–11 | 3–6 | 2–7 |

x - Clinched playoff berth
y - Clinched division

== Schedule ==
=== Regular season ===
The Shock opened the season against the Iowa Barnstormers at home on March 15. Their last regular season game was on the road against the Portland Thunder on July 26.

| Week | Day | Date | Kickoff | Opponent | Results | | Location | Attendance | Report |
| Week | Day | Date | Kickoff | Opponent | Score | Record | Location | Attendance | Report |
|---|---|---|---|---|---|---|---|---|---|
| 1 | Saturday | March 15 | 7:00 p.m. PDT | Iowa Barnstormers | W 64–35 | 1–0 | Spokane Veterans Memorial Arena | 10,224 | |
| 2 | Sunday | March 23 | 3:30 p.m. PDT | at Arizona Rattlers | L 49–68 | 1–1 | US Airways Center | 7,128 | |
| 3 | Bye | | | | | | | | |
| 4 | Friday | April 4 | 7:30 p.m. PDT | at San Jose SaberCats | W 73–62 | 2–1 | SAP Center at San Jose | 7,215 | |
| 5 | Saturday | April 12 | 7:00 p.m. PDT | Portland Thunder | W 55–27 | 3–1 | Spokane Veterans Memorial Arena | 8,652 | |
| 6 | Saturday | April 19 | 7:00 p.m. PDT | Cleveland Gladiators | L 50–52 | 3–2 | Spokane Veterans Memorial Arena | 8,752 | |
| 7 | Saturday | April 26 | 4:30 p.m. PDT | at Tampa Bay Storm | W 53–41 | 4–2 | Tampa Bay Times Forum | 9,448 | |
| 8 | Saturday | May 3 | 4:00 p.m. PDT | at Los Angeles Kiss | W 70–21 | 5–2 | Honda Center | 10,552 | |
| 9 | Friday | May 9 | 7:00 p.m. PDT | Pittsburgh Power | L 41–52 | 5–3 | Spokane Veterans Memorial Arena | 8,742 | |
| 10 | Saturday | May 17 | 6:00 p.m. PDT | at Arizona Rattlers | L 38–70 | 5–4 | US Airways Center | 9,437 | |
| 11 | Friday | May 23 | 7:00 p.m. PDT | San Jose SaberCats | L 34–52 | 5–5 | Spokane Veterans Memorial Arena | 8,579 | |
| 12 | Friday | May 30 | 7:00 p.m. PDT | Portland Thunder | W 58–48 | 6–5 | Spokane Veterans Memorial Arena | 8,535 | |
| 13 | Saturday | June 7 | 4:00 p.m. PDT | at Jacksonville Sharks | L 28–34 | 6–6 | Jacksonville Veterans Memorial Arena | 9,401 | |
| 14 | Saturday | June 14 | 7:30 p.m. PDT | at San Jose SaberCats | L 37–47 | 6–7 | SAP Center at San Jose | 8,263 | |
| 15 | Friday | June 20 | 7:00 p.m. PDT | San Antonio Talons | W 70–30 | 7–7 | Spokane Veterans Memorial Arena | 8,489 | |
| 16 | Saturday | June 28 | 7:00 p.m. PDT | at Los Angeles Kiss | W 64–46 | 8–7 | Honda Center | 10,751 | |
| 17 | Bye | | | | | | | | |
| 18 | Saturday | July 12 | 7:00 p.m. PDT | Arizona Rattlers | W 73–66 | 9–7 | Spokane Veterans Memorial Arena | 9,362 | |
| 19 | Monday | July 22 | 5:30 p.m. PDT | Tampa Bay Storm | W 55–52 | 10–7 | Spokane Veterans Memorial Arena | 9,479 | |
| 20 | Saturday | July 26 | 7:00 p.m. PDT | at Portland Thunder | W 45–40 | 11–7 | Moda Center | 12,848 | |

=== Playoffs ===
| Round | Day | Date | Kickoff | Opponent | Results | Location | Attendance | Report |
|---|---|---|---|---|---|---|---|---|
| NC Semifinals | Saturday | August 2 | 7:00 p.m. PDT | at San Jose SaberCats | L 28–55 | SAP Center at San Jose | 11,333 | |

== Roster ==
2014 Spokane Shock roster
| Quarterbacks: 9 Erik Meyer; 14 Brian Zbydniewski; Fullbacks: Currently vacant; Wide receivers: 13 Rashaad Carter; 17 Adron Tennell; 81 Nick Truesdell; 7 Mike Washington | Offensive linemen: 75 Patrick Afif; 68 Ryan Cave; 55 Mark Jackson; 42 Rory Nixon; 51 Sam Tupua; Defensive linemen: 4 Jeremy Geathers; 3 Brandon Peguese; 44 James Ruffin; 56 Derrick Summers; 67 Terrance Taylor | Linebackers: 36 Bryson Kelly; 8 Terence Moore; Defensive backs: 21 Bryant Nnabuife; 23 Sam Pope; 5 Terrance Sanders; 1 Paul Stephens; 2 Jimmy Williams; Kickers: 6 Taylor Rowan | Injured reserve: 16 Jarrett Brown QB; 19 Samuel Charles WR; 28 J. T. Fitzgerald DB; 18 Nichiren Flowers WR; 66 Deveric Gallington OL; 10 Andrew Joseph WR; -- Palauni Ma Sun OL; 3 Josh Pleasant DB; -- Joe Southwick QB; Refuse to report: 32 Antareis Bryan DB; 74 Tyrone Novikoff OL; Other League Exempt: 90 Kourtnei Brown DL; 12 Kamar Jorden WR; 7 Lowell Rose DB; League suspension: 16 Steven Black WR; Team suspension: 11 Diyral Briggs DL; Inactive reserve: 70 Myniya Smith OL; Recallable reassignment: Currently vacant; Rookies in italics Roster updated July 31, 2014; 24 Active, 17 Inactive → More rosters |
