= Shannon Breen =

American gridiron football player (born 1989)

No. 55, 74
- Title: Center

Personal information
- Born: March 16, 1989 (age 37)
- Listed height: 6 ft 4 in (1.93 m)
- Listed weight: 305 lb (138 kg)

Career information
- High school: Linganore (Frederick, Maryland)
- College: West Virginia Wesleyan
- NFL draft: 2011: undrafted

Career history

Playing
- Milwaukee Mustangs (2012); Green Bay Blizzard (2012); Cleveland Gladiators (2013–2014); Montreal Alouettes (2014)*; Philadelphia Soul (2015)
- * Offseason or practice squad member only

Coaching
- West Virginia Wesleyan (2012) Offensive line coach

Awards and highlights
- First-team All-Arena (2015); Second-team All-Arena (2014); Spalding Offensive Lineman of the Year (2015); First-team All-WVIAC (2010); Second-team All-WVIAC (2009)
- Stats at ArenaFan.com

Shannon Breen (born March 16, 1989) is an American former professional football center who played in the Arena Football League (AFL). He played college football at West Virginia Wesleyan. He was a member of the Milwaukee Mustangs, Green Bay Blizzard, Cleveland Gladiators, Montreal Alouettes and Philadelphia Soul.

== Early life ==
Breen graduated from Linganore High School in Frederick, Maryland, in 2007. He earned first-team Carroll All-Gazette Football and first-team All-MVAL Chesapeake Conference honors as a center his senior season in 2006.

== College career ==
Breen was a four-year starter and a two-year captain for the West Virginia Wesleyan Bobcats of West Virginia Wesleyan College. He became a starter at center midway through his freshman year and then moved to right tackle the following year. He was then a left tackle his final two years of college. Breen earned second-team All-WVIAC honors his junior season in 2009. He earned first-team All-WVIAC honors as a left tackle his senior year in 2010 while helping the Bobcats achieve a 9–2 record and the school’s first Top 25 appearance. He was selected to the 2010 All-American Bowl and the 2011 Cactus Bowl. Breen was named the Mick Tingelhoff Award winner as the top offensive lineman at the conclusion of the 2010 All-American Bowl. He also garnered second-team All-Super Region 1 accolades in 2010. He studied criminal justice and sociology at West Virginia Wesleyan. Breen graduated in 2011.

== Professional career ==
Breen was assigned to the Milwaukee Mustangs of the Arena Football League (AFL) on October 14, 2011. He was activated on July 4, 2012. He played in four games for the team during the 2012 season.

Breen played for the Green Bay Blizzard of the Indoor Football League in 2012.

Breen was assigned to the AFL's Cleveland Gladiators on November 8, 2012. He started eighteen games for the Gladiators in 2013. He played in sixteen games for the team during the 2014 season, garnering second-team All-Arena accolades as a center. Breen played in ArenaBowl XXVII on August 23, 2014, a 72–32 loss to the Arizona Rattlers. He also participated in the AFL China exhibition games in Honolulu, Hawaii, and Beijing, China, in 2013.

Breen signed with the Montreal Alouettes of the Canadian Football League on June 4, 2014. He was released by the Alouettes on June 10, 2014.

Breen was assigned to the Philadelphia Soul of the AFL on November 20, 2014. He started seventeen games for the Soul in 2015, earning first-team All-Arena honors. He was also named the Spalding Offensive Lineman of the Year.

Breen had workouts with the New York Jets, Pittsburgh Steelers, Indianapolis Colts and Cleveland Browns of the National Football League in the past.

== Coaching career ==
Breen spent time as the offensive line coach of the West Virginia Wesleyan Bobcats in 2012.
