= Michael Huey (American football) =

American football player (born 1988)

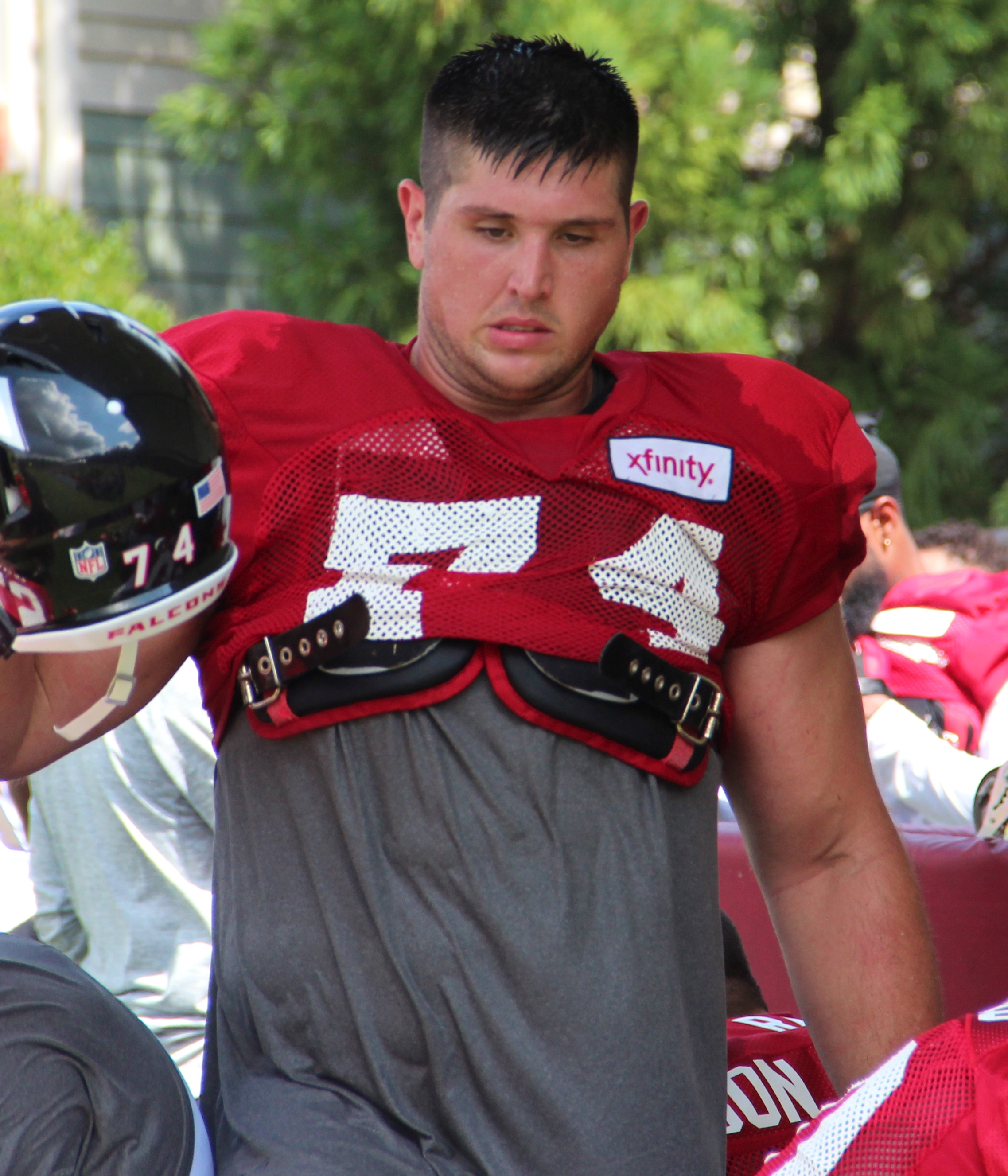
- Huey with the Atlanta Falcons in 2016

No. 63, 74
- Position: Offensive guard

Personal information
- Born: September 28, 1988 (age 38); Longview, Texas, U.S.
- Listed height: 6 ft 5 in (1.96 m)
- Listed weight: 317 lb (144 kg)

Career information
- High school: Kilgore (Kilgore, Texas)
- College: Texas
- NFL draft: 2011: undrafted

Career history
- Seattle Seahawks (2011)*; San Diego Chargers (2011)*; Arizona Rattlers (2012–2014); Washington Redskins (2014)*; San Diego Chargers (2015)*; Atlanta Falcons (2016)*; Arizona Rattlers (2017)
- * Offseason or practice squad member only

Awards and highlights
- 3× ArenaBowl champion (2012, 2013, 2014); United Bowl champion (2017); 2× First-team All-Arena (2012, 2014); Second-team All-Arena (2013)

Career AFL statistics
- Receptions: 9
- Receiving yards: 97
- Receiving touchdowns: 3
- Total tackles: 1
- Stats at ArenaFan.com
- Stats at Pro Football Reference

Michael Huey (born September 28, 1988) is an American former professional football player who was an offensive guard in the National Football League (NFL). He played college football for the Texas Longhorns. He was a member of the Seattle Seahawks, San Diego Chargers, Arizona Rattlers, Washington Redskins and Atlanta Falcons.

== Early life ==
Huey played high school football at Kilgore High School in Kilgore, Texas. He was named first-team 4A all-state by the Associated Press and the Texas Sports Writers Association as a senior. Huey was also named all-district, all-region, and district 12-4A Lineman of the Year his senior year. He was a starter in the 2007 U.S. Army All-American Bowl.

== College career ==
Huey played football for the Texas Longhorns from 2007 to 2010. He appeared in 13 games at guard and on special teams as a freshman. He appeared in 13 games his sophomore year, starting three. Huey appeared in 13 games his junior year, starting nine. He started eight games at left guard his senior year and was a second-team Academic All-Big 12 selection. He was also one of four team captains for the year.

== Professional career ==
Pre-draft measurables
Height	Weight	40-yard dash	10-yard split	20-yard split	20-yard shuttle	Three-cone drill	Vertical jump	Broad jump	Bench press
6 ft 4 in (1.93 m)	304 lb (138 kg)	5.10 s	1.79 s	2.94 s	4.58 s	8.22 s	33 1/2 in (0.85 m)	9 ft 5 in (2.87 m)	35 reps
All values from Texas Pro Day

Huey was signed by the Seattle Seahawks of the NFL on July 26, 2011 after going undrafted in the 2011 NFL draft. He was released by the Seahawks on August 3, 2011.

He signed with the NFL's San Diego Chargers on August 9, 2011. He was released by the Chargers on August 30, 2011.

Huey was signed by the Arizona Rattlers of the Arena Football League on December 1, 2011. He started 14 games as a rookie and was named first-team All-Arena in 2012. The Rattlers defeated the Philadelphia Soul 72–54 to win ArenaBowl XXV on August 10, 2012. He was signed to a three-year deal by the Rattlers on October 22, 2012. Huey was named second-team All-Arena in 2013, starting 17 games. The Rattlers defeated the Philadelphia Soul 48–39 in ArenaBowl XXVI on August 17, 2013, to win their second straight ArenaBowl championship. He was named first-team All-Arena for the second time in 2014 as the Rattlers defeated the Cleveland Gladiators 72–32 in ArenaBowl XXVII on August 23, 2014, to win their third straight league championship. Huey also had nine receptions for three touchdowns in his career.

On November 17, 2014, he was signed to the practice squad of the Washington Redskins of the NFL. He was released by the Redskins on December 1, 2014.

Huey signed with the Chargers on March 31, 2015. He was released on September 5, signed to the Chargers' practice squad on September 6, released again on September 25, signed to the practice squad again on September 29, released for the fourth time on October 6, signed to the practice squad for the third time on October 21, released for the fifth time on October 24, and signed to the practice squad for the final time on December 28, 2015. Huey signed a reserve/future contract with the Chargers on January 5, 2016. He was released by San Diego on May 12, 2016.

Having been released by the Chargers, Huey's AFL rights still belonged to the Rattlers, but he did not return to the team.

On June 7, 2016, Huey signed with the Atlanta Falcons. On August 27, 2016, he was waived by the Falcons.

On June 20, 2017, he signed with the Rattlers, who were now a member of the Indoor Football League. On July 8, the Rattlers defeated the Sioux Falls Storm in the United Bowl by a score of 50–41.
