= 2014 New Orleans VooDoo season =

Sports season

- Head coach: Pat O'Hara
- Home stadium: Smoothie King Center

Results
- Record: 3–15
- Division place: 4th AC South
- Playoffs: Did not qualify

The 2014 New Orleans VooDoo season was the eighth season for the franchise in the Arena Football League. The team was coached by Pat O'Hara and played their home games at the Smoothie King Center. The VooDoo finished the season 3-15 in a three way tie to be last in the league and failed to make the playoffs for a second straight season.

== Standings ==
South Division
Team	W	L	PCT	PF	PA	DIV	CON	Home	Away
y-Orlando Predators	11	7	.611	1005	957	7–2	8–6	7–2	4–5
Tampa Bay Storm	8	10	.444	904	953	4–3	7–6	5–4	3–6
Jacksonville Sharks	7	11	.389	879	862	2–5	3–8	4–5	3–6
New Orleans VooDoo	3	15	.167	770	1011	2–5	2–12	1–8	2–7

y - Clinched division

== Schedule ==
The VooDoo began the season on March 14, on the road against the Tampa Bay Storm. They hosted the San Antonio Talons on July 26 in their last regular season game.

Week	Day	Date	Kickoff	Opponent	Results		Location	Attendance	Report
Week	Day	Date	Kickoff	Opponent	Score	Record	Location	Attendance	Report
1	Friday	March 14	6:30 p.m. CDT	at Tampa Bay Storm	L 57–62	0–1	Tampa Bay Times Forum	10,370	
2	Bye								
3	Saturday	March 29	7:00 p.m. CDT	Cleveland Gladiators	L 26–37	0–2	Smoothie King Center	5,695	
4	Thursday	April 3	7:30 p.m. CDT	Orlando Predators	W 62–55	1–2	Smoothie King Center	4,740	
5	Friday	April 11	6:00 p.m. CDT	at Pittsburgh Power	L 14–56	1–3	Consol Energy Center	5,224	
6	Friday	April 18	7:30 p.m. CDT	San Antonio Talons	L 33–68	1–4	Smoothie King Center	6,097	
7	Saturday	April 26	6:30 p.m. CDT	at Orlando Predators	L 48–63	1–5	CFE Arena	5,013	
8	Bye								
9	Saturday	May 10	5:00 p.m. CDT	at Philadelphia Soul	L 60–79	1–6	Wells Fargo Center	6,080	
10	Saturday	May 17	7:00 p.m. CDT	at San Antonio Talons	W 62–44	2–6	Alamodome	6,125	
11	Saturday	May 24	7:00 p.m. CDT	Iowa Barnstormers	L 41–51	2–7	Smoothie King Center	6,193	
12	Friday	May 30	7:30 p.m. CDT	Tampa Bay Storm	L 48–62	2–8	Smoothie King Center	4,853	
13	Saturday	June 7	5:00 p.m. CDT	at Pittsburgh Power	L 26–65	2–9	Consol Energy Center	5,419	
14	Saturday	June 14	6:00 p.m. CDT	at Cleveland Gladiators	L 46–62	2–10	Quicken Loans Arena	9,404	
15	Saturday	June 21	7:00 p.m. CDT	Jacksonville Sharks	L 13–54	2–11	Smoothie King Center	5,243	
16	Thursday	June 26	9:00 p.m. CDT	at Portland Thunder	L 56–62	2–12	Moda Center	7,969	
17	Monday	July 7	7:30 p.m. CDT	Pittsburgh Power	L 43–48	2–13	Smoothie King Center	4,966	
18	Saturday	July 12	6:00 p.m. CDT	at Jacksonville Sharks	W 36–35	3–13	Jacksonville Veterans Memorial Arena	8,960	
19	Saturday	July 19	7:00 p.m. CDT	Orlando Predators	L 64–70 (OT)	3–14	Smoothie King Center	5,535	
20	Saturday	July 26	7:00 p.m. CDT	San Antonio Talons	L 32–35 (OT)	3–15	Smoothie King Center	6,217	

== Roster ==
2014 New Orleans VooDoo roster
Quarterbacks: 12 Brian Hudson; 14 Adam Kennedy; 14 Kurt Rocco; Fullbacks: 40 Kevin Ashak; Wide receivers: 88 Larry Beavers; 4 Carlese Franklin; 15 Quorey Payne; 5 Antonio Robinson; 6 Courtney Smith	Offensive linemen: 77 Nyere Aumaitre; 72 Leonardo Bates; 71 Richard Muldrow; 79 Ben Ossai; 22 Quentin Saulsberry; Defensive linemen: 44 Mike Alston; 99 Marlon Favorite; 3 Kwame Jordan	Linebackers: 7 Tyus Jackson; 13 Wesley Mauia; Defensive backs: 2 Travis Coleman; 24 Justin Hannah; 20 Cameron McGlenn; 1 Demarcus Robinson; Kickers: 11 Josh Jasper	Injured reserve: 4 DeAndre Brown WR; 75 Josh Downs DL; 3 Chris Duvalt WR; 6 Dwayne Eley, Jr. WR; 89 Derandus Frye DL; 3 B. J. Hall QB; 95 Kadeem Higgins DL; 12 Ryan Perrilloux QB; 14 Kurt Rocco QB; 3 Taylor Russolino K; Refused to report: Currently vacant; Other league exempt: -- Daniel Hrapmann K; League suspension: 24 Andre Kates DB; 77 Jesse Peterson OL; -- Mario Urrutia WR; Inactive reserve: 96 Xavier Brown DL; 82 Chase Deadder WR; Recallable reassignment: Currently vacant; Rookies in italics Roster updated July 24, 2014; 23 Active, 16 Inactive → More rosters
