= Jason Murrietta =

American football player (born 1984)

No. 7, 12
- Position: Quarterback

Personal information
- Born: September 9, 1984 (age 42)
- Listed height: 6 ft 1 in (1.85 m)
- Listed weight: 230 lb (104 kg)

Career information
- High school: Glendale (AZ) Ironwood
- College: Northern Arizona
- NFL draft: 2007: undrafted

Career history
- Rock River Raptors (2007); Spokane Shock (2008); Central Valley Coyotes (2009); Arizona Rattlers (2012–2015)

Awards and highlights
- 3× ArenaBowl champion (2012, 2013, 2014); Big Sky Offensive Player of the Year (2006); Northern Arizona University Athletic Hall of Fame (2016)

Career AFL statistics
- Comp. / Att.: 80 / 126
- Passing yards: 1,021
- TD–INT: 27–5
- QB rating: 111.81
- Rushing TD: 0
- Stats at ArenaFan.com

Jason Murrietta (born September 9, 1984) is an American former football quarterback. He was signed by the Spokane Shock as an undrafted free agent in 2008. He played college football at Northern Arizona University and was named the Big Sky Offensive Player of the Year in 2006.
