= 2014 San Antonio Talons season =

Arena Football League team season

- Head coach: Lee Johnson
- Home stadium: Alamodome

Results
- Record: 3–15
- Division place: 2nd NC West
- Playoffs: Did not qualify

The 2014 San Antonio Talons season was the 14th season for the franchise, the fifth in the Arena Football League, and the third in San Antonio, Texas. The team was coached by Lee Johnson and played their home games at the Alamodome. Finishing the regular season with a 3–15 record, this was the worst season in franchise history.

== Standings ==
West Division
| Team | W | L | PCT | PF | PA | DIV | CON | Home | Away |
| z-Arizona Rattlers | 15 | 3 | .833 | 1151 | 905 | 4–0 | 11–2 | 9–0 | 6–3 |
| San Antonio Talons | 3 | 15 | .167 | 743 | 1017 | 1–3 | 1–5 | 0–9 | 3–6 |
| Los Angeles Kiss | 3 | 15 | .167 | 633 | 957 | 1–3 | 3–9 | 2–7 | 1–8 |

z - Clinched division and conference's best record

== Schedule ==
The Talons began the season at home against the Los Angeles Kiss on March 15. Their last regular season game was on the road against the New Orleans VooDoo on July 26.

| Week | Day | Date | Kickoff | Opponent | Results | | Location | Attendance | Report |
| Week | Day | Date | Kickoff | Opponent | Score | Record | Location | Attendance | Report |
|---|---|---|---|---|---|---|---|---|---|
| 1 | Saturday | March 15 | 7:00 p.m. CDT | Los Angeles Kiss | L 38–41 | 0–1 | Alamodome | 8,269 | |
| 2 | Friday | March 21 | 7:30 p.m. CDT | Tampa Bay Storm | L 45–48 | 0–2 | Alamodome | 5,981 | |
| 3 | Saturday | March 29 | 6:00 p.m. CDT | at Jacksonville Sharks | L 22–63 | 0–3 | Jacksonville Veterans Memorial Arena | 10,144 | |
| 4 | Friday | April 4 | 7:30 p.m. CDT | Pittsburgh Power | L 17–70 | 0–4 | Alamodome | 4,112 | |
| 5 | Saturday | April 12 | 7:05 p.m. CDT | at Iowa Barnstormers | L 62–63 | 0–5 | Wells Fargo Arena | 8,763 | |
| 6 | Friday | April 18 | 7:30 p.m. CDT | at New Orleans VooDoo | W 69–33 | 1–5 | Smoothie King Center | 6,097 | |
| 7 | Saturday | April 26 | 6:00 p.m. CDT | at Arizona Rattlers | L 59–69 | 1–6 | US Airways Center | 8,567 | |
| 8 | Saturday | May 3 | 7:00 p.m. CDT | Iowa Barnstormers | L 52–62 | 1–7 | Alamodome | 7,283 | |
| 9 | Bye | | | | | | | | |
| 10 | Saturday | May 17 | 7:00 p.m. CDT | New Orleans VooDoo | L 44–62 | 1–8 | Alamodome | 6,125 | |
| 11 | Thursday | May 22 | 9:00 p.m. CDT | at Portland Thunder | L 40–55 | 1–9 | Moda Center | 6,396 | |
| 12 | Saturday | May 31 | 5:00 p.m. CDT | at Philadelphia Soul | L 40–76 | 1–10 | Wells Fargo Center | 7,811 | |
| 13 | Saturday | June 7 | 7:00 p.m. CDT | Orlando Predators | L 39–58 | 1–11 | Alamodome | 6,237 | |
| 14 | Saturday | June 14 | 7:00 p.m. CDT | Arizona Rattlers | L 34–70 | 1–12 | Alamodome | 5,692 | |
| 15 | Friday | June 20 | 9:00 p.m. CDT | at Spokane Shock | L 30–70 | 1–13 | Spokane Veterans Memorial Arena | 8,489 | |
| 16 | Bye | | | | | | | | |
| 17 | Saturday | July 5 | 7:00 p.m. CDT | Jacksonville Sharks | L 34–62 | 1–14 | Alamodome | 5,212 | |
| 18 | Saturday | July 12 | 7:00 p.m. CDT | Cleveland Gladiators | L 47–50 (OT) | 1–15 | Alamodome | 8,217 | |
| 19 | Saturday | July 19 | 9:00 p.m. CDT | at Los Angeles Kiss | W 72–65 | 2–15 | Honda Center | 11,059 | |
| 20 | Saturday | July 26 | 7:00 p.m. CDT | at New Orleans VooDoo | W 38–35 (OT) | 3–15 | Smoothie King Center | 6,217 | |

== Roster ==
2014 San Antonio Talons roster
| Quarterbacks: 15 Matt Bassuener; 17 Shane Boyd; Fullbacks: 28 Mykel Benson; Wide receivers: 8 P. J. Berry; 21 Brent Holmes; 23 Doug Pierce; 82 Robert Quiroga; 20 Clinton Solomon | Offensive linemen: 64 Ray Hisatake; 96 Moqut Ruffins; 55 Wondell Rutledge; 61 Jeremy Schonbrunner; Defensive linemen: 57 Jermaine McGhee; 4 Jeramie Richardson; 18 Brandon Sesay; 33 Mark Weivoda | Linebackers: 11 Micah King; 44 Jamar Ransom; 3 Pierre Turner; Defensive backs: 2 Maurice Holmes; 1 Kelvin Rodgers; -- Derrick Thomas; 6 LeRoy Vann; Kickers: 5 Garrett Lindholm | Injured reserve: 2 Carlton Brown DB; -- Brandon Griffin DB; 69 Colton Jones OL; -- Markus McFolling FB; 20 L. A. Reed DB; 7 D. J. Stephens WR; 71 Shannon Tevaga OL; 15 Kyle Whitehurst DB; Refuse to report: 28 Chad Cook FB; 42 Victor DeGrate DL; -- Josh Ferguson DB; League suspension: -- Dallas Baker WR; -- Paul Cox WR; -- Marell Evans LB; -- Justin Hannah DB; 14 David Little WR; 55 Brock Mueller OL; Team suspension: 50 Paul Griffin DL; Other league exempt: -- G. J. Kinne QB; 68 Jeremy Lewis OL; Inactive reserve: 10 D. J. Johnson DB; Recallable reassignment: Currently vacant; Rookies in italics Roster updated July 23, 2014; 24 Active, 21 Inactive → More rosters |

== Staff ==
San Antonio Talons staff
| Front office: Executive vice president/ coo – Keith Recine; Vice president of corporate sales/ director of game day operations – Juan Aguilera; Director of ticket sales – Marlon McClary; Director of communications – Courtney Schoenemann; Executive assistant/ game day operations – Amie Hardin; Ticket manager – Marco Pena; Activation Specialist & Game Day Operations – Kimberly Olivarez; Group sales/ community relations coordinator – J. J. De La Rosa; Premium suite sales – Dan Brenner | Head coach: Head coach – Lee Johnson; Offensive coaches: Offensive coordinator – Raymond Philyaw; Defensive coaches: Defensive coordinator – Mike Brown; Support staff: Video coordinator – Brian Campbell; Equipment manager – Tom Dillard |
