= Ray Little =

Australian cricketer

Personal information
- Born: 7 October 1914; Uralla, New South Wales, Australia
- Died: 28 April 1995 (aged 80); Burwood, New South Wales, Australia
- Source: ESPNcricinfo, 5 January 2017

Ray Little (7 October 1914 – 28 April 1995) was an Australian cricketer. He played eight first-class matches for New South Wales between 1934/35 and 1935/36.

== See also ==
- List of New South Wales representative cricketers
