= 2014 Los Angeles Kiss season =

Arena Football League team season

- Owner: Kiss; Doc McGhee; Brett Bouchy
- Head coach: Bob McMillen
- Home stadium: Honda Center

Results
- Record: 3–15
- Division place: 3rd NC West
- Playoffs: Did not qualify

The 2014 Los Angeles Kiss season was the franchise's first season in the Arena Football League (AFL). The team was coached by Bob McMillen and played their home games at the Honda Center.

In their inaugural season, the Kiss did well at the box office, finishing second in the AFL (behind Tampa Bay) in attendance, drawing 98,505 fans to nine home games (or 10,945 per game). On the field, though, it was a different story: after winning two of their first three games, LA managed just one victory thereafter, finishing 3–15 and missing the playoffs.

== Offseason ==
=== 2013 dispersal draft ===
Draft order			Player name	Position	Height	Weight	2013 Team	Notes
Round	Choice	Overall	Player name	Position	Height	Weight	2013 Team	Notes
1	--	--	Traded to the Iowa Barnstormers^{[a]}					
2	--	--	Antwan Marsh	Linebacker	6-3	225	Utah Blaze	
3	--	--	Chase Deadder	Wide receiver	6-5	225	Utah Blaze	

Notes
^{^[a]} Los Angeles traded their first-round selection to Iowa in exchange for quarterback J. J. Raterink.

=== Roster changes ===
ADDITIONS
Date	Player name	Position	Previous team
September 12, 2013	Joe Mortensen	LB	Utah Blaze
September 18, 2013	Alfred Phillips	DB	Utah Blaze
September 27, 2013	Beau Bell	LB	Spokane Shock
September 27, 2013	Kenny Spencer	K	New Orleans VooDoo
October 24, 2013	Jeff Tow-Arnett	FB	Tampa Bay Storm

== Regular season ==
=== Schedule ===
The Kiss began the season on the road against the San Antonio Talons on March 15. Their final regular season game was on July 26, on the road against the Jacksonville Sharks.

Week	Day	Date	Kickoff	Opponent	Results		Location	Attendance	Report
Week	Day	Date	Kickoff	Opponent	Score	Record	Location	Attendance	Report
1	Saturday	March 15	5:00 p.m. PDT	at San Antonio Talons	W 41–38	1–0	Alamodome	8,269	
2	Friday	March 21	4:30 p.m. PDT	at Orlando Predators	L 63–69 (OT)	1–1	CFE Arena	5,312	
3	Bye								
4	Saturday	April 5	7:00 p.m. PDT	Portland Thunder	W 44–34	2–1	Honda Center	12,045	
5	Saturday	April 12	7:00 p.m. PDT	Cleveland Gladiators	L 30–40	2–2	Honda Center	10,570	
6	Saturday	April 19	5:05 p.m. PDT	at Iowa Barnstormers	L 12–31	2–3	Wells Fargo Arena	9,152	
7	Saturday	April 26	7:00 p.m. PDT	San Jose SaberCats	L 32–48	2–4	Honda Center	10,569	
8	Sunday	May 4	4:00 p.m. PDT	Spokane Shock	L 21–70	2–5	Honda Center	10,552	
9	Saturday	May 10	4:00 p.m. PDT	at Cleveland Gladiators	L 42–45	2–6	Quicken Loans Arena	10,472	
10	Saturday	May 17	2:00 p.m. PDT	at Pittsburgh Power	L 26–50	2–7	Consol Energy Center	7,762	
11	Sunday	May 25	7:00 p.m. PDT	Arizona Rattlers	L 25–70	2–8	Honda Center	11,302	
12	Bye								
13	Saturday	June 7	7:30 p.m. PDT	at San Jose SaberCats	L 35–63	2–9	SAP Center at San Jose	8,637	
14	Saturday	June 14	7:00 p.m. PDT	Portland Thunder	W 69–61	3–9	Honda Center	10,980	
15	Saturday	June 21	6:00 p.m. PDT	at Arizona Rattlers	L 47–83	3–10	US Airways Center	10,750	
16	Saturday	June 28	7:00 p.m. PDT	Spokane Shock	L 46–64	3–11	Honda Center	10,751	
17	Sunday	July 6	7:00 p.m. PDT	San Jose SaberCats	L 34–75	3–12	Honda Center	10,677	
18	Saturday	July 12	7:00 p.m. PDT	at Portland Thunder	L 31–44	3–13	Moda Center	8,802	
19	Saturday	July 19	7:00 p.m. PDT	San Antonio Talons	L 65–72	3–14	Honda Center	11,059	
20	Saturday	July 26	4:00 p.m. PDT	at Jacksonville Sharks	L 36–53	3–15	Jacksonville Veterans Memorial Arena	11,084	

=== Standings ===
West Division
Team	W	L	PCT	PF	PA	DIV	CON	Home	Away
z-Arizona Rattlers	15	3	.833	1151	905	4–0	11–2	9–0	6–3
San Antonio Talons	3	15	.167	743	1017	1–3	1–5	0–9	3–6
Los Angeles Kiss	3	15	.167	633	957	1–3	3–9	2–7	1–8

z - Clinched division and conference's best record

== Staff ==
Los Angeles Kiss staff
Front office: Co-Owner – Gene Simmons; Co-Owner – Paul Stanley; Co-Owner – Doc McGhee; Co-Owner – Brett Bouchy; President – Schuyler Hoversten	Head coach: Head Coach - Bob McMillen; Offensive coaches: currently vacant; Defensive coaches: currently vacant

== Roster ==
2014 Los Angeles Kiss roster
Quarterbacks: 12 Kenny Guiton; 11 J. J. Raterink; Fullbacks: 74 Andres Vargas; Wide receivers: 1 Donovan Morgan; 7 Brandon Thompkins	Offensive linemen: 70 Michael Diaz; 63 Joe Madsen; 55 Julius Wilson; Defensive linemen: 94 B. J. Bell; 56 Nekos Brown; 64 Sam Campbell; 71 Darryl Cato-Bishop; 92 David Williams	Linebackers: 33 Ayo Idowu; 26 Shawn Loiseau; Defensive backs: 23 A. J. Cruz; 13 Donnie Fletcher; 22 Terrence Johnson; 4 Otis Merrill; 14 J. C. Neal; Kickers: 19 Kenny Spencer	Injured reserve: 2 Beau Bell LB; 95 Tonio Celotto DL; 5 Matt Estrada DB; 8 Aaron Garcia QB; 9 Samora Goodson WR; 42 Joe Mortensen FB; 92 Elhadji Ndiaye DL; 99 Nigel Nicholas DL; 6 Romeo Pellum DB; 22 Wesley Pendleton DB; 52 Dominie Pittman DL; 3 Raymond Radway WR; 18 DeMarco Sampson WR; 16 Michale Spicer DL; 75 Cameron Stephenson OL; Refuse to report: 74 Isaac Leatiota OL; Other League Exempt: 60 Chad Anderson OL; 11 L. J. Castile WR; -- Chris Summers WR; League Suspension: 33 Lou Alexander OL; 72 Zach Allen OL; 57 Johan Asiata OL; -- Shawn Asiata FB; 4 Terrence Austin WR; 95 Colin Bryant DL; -- Damien Edwards; 92 Brian Price DL; 60 Jason Shirley OL; -- Jeremiah Tofaeono OL; 33 Roderick Tomlin OL; 33 David Veikune DL; Inactive reserve: -- Greg Brown DB; Recallable reassignment: currently vacant; rookies in italics Roster updated July 24, 2014; 21 Active, 30 Inactive
