= Clifford Dukes =

American gridiron football player (born 1981)

No. 6
- Position: Defensive lineman

Personal information
- Born: June 26, 1981 (age 45); Lexington Park, Maryland, U.S.
- Listed height: 6 ft 3 in (1.91 m)
- Listed weight: 258 lb (117 kg)

Career information
- High school: Great Mills (MD)
- College: Michigan State
- NFL draft: 2005: undrafted

Career history
- St. Louis Rams (2005); New Orleans Saints (2006)*; Detroit Lions (2006)*; Tampa Bay Storm (2008); Toronto Argonauts (2009)*; Tampa Bay Storm (2010–2011); Omaha Nighthawks (2011)*; Kansas City Command (2012)*; Arizona Rattlers (2012–2016); Baltimore Brigade (2018)
- * Offseason or practice squad member only

Awards and highlights
- 3× ArenaBowl champion (2012, 2013, 2014); First-team All-Arena (2011); 2× Second-team All-Arena (2010, 2014); AFL Defensive Lineman of the Year (2011); Second-team All-Big Ten (2003)

Career AFL statistics
- Total tackles: 175.5
- Sacks: 40.5
- Forced fumbles: 10
- Fumble recoveries: 15
- Interceptions: 1
- Stats at ArenaFan.com

Clifford Dukes (born June 26, 1981) is an American former professional football defensive lineman. He played college football at Michigan State from 2000 to 2004. He was signed as an undrafted free agent by the St. Louis Rams in 2005. Dukes was also a member of the New Orleans Saints and Detroit Lions. After not having a chance to play in the NFL, Dukes signed with the Tampa Bay Storm of the AFL in 2008. In 2010, he saw his first chance for real playing time with the Storm. As a result, he was named to the All-Arena team in 2010. In 2011, he led the league with 12.5 sacks and was named the 2011 Game Tape Exchange Defensive Lineman of the Year. He was traded to the Kansas City Command in 2012, only to be traded to the Arizona Rattlers two days later.

== Early life ==
Born the son of Gloria Dukes, Cliff attended Great Mills High School in Great Mills, Maryland. There he was a standout member of the football team according to his coaches and peers. A two ways player, he played both fullback and linebacker. On defense his senior season, he recorded 105 tackles (56 solos, 49 assists), including eight for losses, and intercepted two passes, while also forced four fumbles and recovered three. On offense, he rushed for 619 yards on 119 carries and scored seven touchdowns.

== College career ==
Upon high school graduation, Dukes accepted a football scholarship to Michigan State University where he majored in family community services, and was a member of the football team.

== Professional career ==
=== Tampa Bay Storm ===
After not having a chance to play in the NFL, Dukes signed with the Tampa Bay Storm of the AFL in 2008. In 2010, he saw his first chance for real playing time with the Storm. As a result, he was named to the All-Arena team in 2010. In 2011, he led the league with 12.5 sacks and was named the 2011 Game Tape Exchange Defensive Lineman of the Year.

=== Kansas City Command ===
On February 7, 2012, Dukes was traded to the Kansas City Command in 2012, for quarterback Stephen Wasil.

=== Arizona Rattlers ===
On February 9, 2012, Dukes was traded by the Command to the Arizona Rattlers for defensive back J. C. Neal. Dukes helped the Rattlers reach ArenaBowl XXVI in 2013, where they defeated the Soul for their second consecutive championship.

=== Baltimore Brigade ===
On July 26, 2018, Dukes was assigned to the Baltimore Brigade, just days prior to ArenaBowl XXXI.
