= 2014 Iowa Barnstormers season =

Arena Football League team season

- Head coach: Mike Hohensee
- Home stadium: Wells Fargo Arena

Results
- Record: 6–12
- Division place: 4th AC East
- Playoffs: Did not qualify

The 2014 Iowa Barnstormers season was the 14th season for the franchise, and their tenth in the Arena Football League. The team was coached by Mike Hohensee and played their home games at the Wells Fargo Arena. The Barnstormers lost their last six games of the season, and failed to reach the playoffs for the fifth consecutive season, finishing with a 6–12 record.

== Standings ==
East Division
Team	W	L	PCT	PF	PA	DIV	CON	Home	Away
z-Cleveland Gladiators	17	1	.944	991	782	7–1	12–1	9–0	8–1
x-Pittsburgh Power	15	3	.833	1015	778	6–2	11–2	8–1	7–2
x-Philadelphia Soul	9	9	.500	1021	949	2–5	7–7	7–2	2–7
Iowa Barnstormers	6	12	.333	848	1046	0–7	2–10	3–6	3–6

x - Clinched playoff berth
z - Clinched division and conference's best record

== Schedule ==
The Barnstormers began the season on March 15, on the road against the Spokane Shock. Their final regular season game took place on July 26 at home against the San Jose SaberCats.

Week	Day	Date	Kickoff	Opponent	Results		Location	Attendance	Report
Week	Day	Date	Kickoff	Opponent	Score	Record	Location	Attendance	Report
1	Saturday	March 15	9:00 PM	at Spokane Shock	L 35–64	0–1	Spokane Veterans Memorial Arena	10,224	
2	Monday	March 24	9:00 PM	at Portland Thunder	W 40–36	1–1	Moda Center	6,521	
3	Bye								
4	Friday	April 4	6:30 PM	at Cleveland Gladiators	L 47–54	1–2	Quicken Loans Arena	10,255	
5	Saturday	April 12	7:05 PM	San Antonio Talons	W 63–62	2–2	Wells Fargo Arena	8,763	
6	Saturday	April 19	7:05 PM	Los Angeles Kiss	W 31–12	3–2	Wells Fargo Arena	9,152	
7	Sunday	April 27	3:00 PM	at Philadelphia Soul	L 55–60	3–3	Wells Fargo Center	10,062	
8	Saturday	May 3	7:00 PM	at San Antonio Talons	W 62–52	4–3	Alamodome	7,283	
9	Saturday	May 10	7:05 PM	Jacksonville Sharks	L 48–68	4–4	Wells Fargo Arena	7,276	
10	Saturday	May 17	7:05 PM	Cleveland Gladiators	L 46–63	4–5	Wells Fargo Arena	7,156	
11	Saturday	May 24	7:00 PM	at New Orleans VooDoo	W 51–41	5–5	Smoothie King Center	6,193	
12	Saturday	May 31	7:05 PM	Orlando Predators	W 58–48	6–5	Wells Fargo Arena	7,442	
13	Saturday	June 7	6:00 PM	at Cleveland Gladiators	L 49–86	6–6	Quicken Loans Arena	9,857	
14	Saturday	June 14	7:05 PM	Tampa Bay Storm	L 56–62 (OT)	6–7	Wells Fargo Arena	8,862	
15	Friday	June 20	6:00 PM	at Pittsburgh Power	L 27–57	6–8	Consol Energy Center	6,657	
16	Saturday	June 28	7:05 PM	Philadelphia Soul	L 48–84	6–9	Wells Fargo Arena	9,551	
17	Bye								
18	Monday	July 14	7:00 PM	at Orlando Predators	L 33–66	6–10	CFE Arena	5,036	
19	Saturday	July 19	7:05 PM	Pittsburgh Power	L 56–59	6–11	Wells Fargo Arena	7,557	
20	Saturday	July 26	7:05 PM	San Jose SaberCats	L 43–72	6–12	Wells Fargo Arena	8,051	

== Roster ==
2014 Iowa Barnstormers roster
Quarterbacks: 2 Carson Coffman; 10 Brian Reader; Fullbacks: 45 Derik Steiner; Wide receivers: 1 DeJay Lester; 7 Darius Reynolds; 3 Marco Thomas; 19 Julian Williams	Offensive linemen: 56 Tray Allen; 62 Chucky Curry; 77 Mike Garrity; 70 Jayson Palmgren; 72 Anthony Parker; -- Tyler Wells; Defensive linemen: 57 Darnell Carter; -- Rodney Gnat; 53 Mike Lewis; 44 Jarvis Reed; 52 Frank Trotter	Linebackers: 17 Matangi Tonga; Defensive backs: 21 Ter'Ran Benton; 9 Mervin Brookins; 20 Devon Dace; 4 Tramain Thomas; Kickers: 14 Ross Gornall	Injured reserve: 11 Wayne Dorsey DL; 8 De'Mon Glanton DB; 6 Jason Simpson DB; 99 William Stokes DL; Refuse to report: -- Cody Johnson FB; -- Jamarko Simmons WR; League Suspension: -- Rennie Moore DL; 22 Jesse Schmidt WR; -- Anthony Wells DL; Other League Exempt: -- Marcus Harris WR; Inactive reserve: Currently vacant; Recallable reassignment: Currently vacant; Rookies in italics; Roster updated July 25, 2014; 23 Active, 10 Inactive; → More rosters
