= Darren Keyton =

American football player (born 1990)

No. 62
- Position: Guard

Personal information
- Born: June 15, 1990 (age 36); Traverse City, Michigan, U.S.
- Listed height: 6 ft 3 in (1.91 m)
- Listed weight: 305 lb (138 kg)

Career information
- College: Central Michigan
- NFL draft: 2013: undrafted

Career history
- Detroit Lions (2013–2015)
- Stats at Pro Football Reference

Darren Keyton (born June 15, 1990) is an American former football guard.

== College career ==
Keyton attended Central Michigan University where he played primarily at guard, He was named Central Michigan's Offensive Upfront Co-Player of the Year after starting all 13 games at right guard as a senior in 2012 . After going undrafted in the 2013 season, Keyton signed a contract with the Lions as a free agent.

== Professional career ==
Keyton signed with the Detroit Lions on May 13, 2013, but was released by the Lions after training camp. He was invited back by the Lions in 2014 and after the 2014 pre-season play, he was not added to the final roster, but he was signed to the Lions practice squad. He was activated off the practice squad for the Lions week 17 game against the Packers, due to the suspension of Lions center Dominic Raiola. Keyton was resigned by the Lions in 2015 but his season was cut short due to an injury in preseason and he was placed on season ending Injury reserve after clearing waivers.

== Personal life ==
Darren's father James Keyton was drafted by the New England Patriots in 1984, but never appeared in a game.
