= 2014 Pittsburgh Power season =

Season of American football

- Head coach: Derek Stingley (fired on March 21; 0–1 record); Ron James (15–2 record)
- Home stadium: Consol Energy Center

Results
- Record: 15–3
- Division place: 2nd AC East
- Playoffs: Lost conference semifinals (Predators) 48–56

The 2014 Pittsburgh Power season was the fourth season for the franchise in the Arena Football League. They played their home games at the Consol Energy Center. The 2014 season marked the franchise's first-ever winning season, after the Power victory over the Philadelphia Soul, 57-56, on June 14. A week later on June 20, the Power clinched their first-ever playoff berth with a 57–27 win over the Iowa Barnstormers. The Power finished the regular season 15–3, but lost in their first-ever playoff game to the Orlando Predators in the conference semifinals by a 56–48 score.

The team had been coached by Derek Stingley, however he was fired after a 63–53 loss to the Cleveland Gladiators in the team's first game of the season. He was replaced by Ron James as the franchise's coach.

== Standings ==
East Division
Team	W	L	PCT	PF	PA	DIV	CON	Home	Away
z-Cleveland Gladiators	17	1	.944	991	782	7–1	12–1	9–0	8–1
x-Pittsburgh Power	15	3	.833	1015	778	6–2	11–2	8–1	7–2
x-Philadelphia Soul	9	9	.500	1021	949	2–5	7–7	7–2	2–7
Iowa Barnstormers	6	12	.333	848	1046	0–7	2–10	3–6	3–6

x - Clinched playoff berth
z - Clinched division and conference's best record

== Schedule ==
=== Regular season ===
The Power began the season at home against the Cleveland Gladiators on March 15. They hosted the Philadelphia Soul in their last regular season game on July 26.

Week	Day	Date	Kickoff (ET)	TV	Opponent	Results		Location	Attendance	Report
Week	Day	Date	Kickoff (ET)	TV	Opponent	Score	Record	Location	Attendance	Report
1	Saturday	March 15	5:00 p.m.	thisTV	Cleveland Gladiators	L 53–63	0–1	Consol Energy Center	7,742	
2	Bye									
3	Saturday	March 29	5:00 p.m.	thisTV	San Jose SaberCats	W 48–47	1–1	Consol Energy Center	4,309	
4	Friday	April 4	8:30 p.m.	ESPN3	at San Antonio Talons	W 70–17	2–1	Alamodome	4,112	
5	Friday	April 11	7:00 p.m.	CBS Sports Network	New Orleans VooDoo	W 56–14	3–1	Consol Energy Center	5,224	
6	Saturday	April 19	9:00 p.m.	ESPN3	at Arizona Rattlers	L 69–73	3–2	US Airways Center	8,179	
7	Saturday	April 26	7:00 p.m.	ESPN3	at Cleveland Gladiators	L 28–55	3–3	Quicken Loans Arena	11,083	
8	Saturday	May 3	7:00 p.m.	thisTV	Philadelphia Soul	W 65–57	4–3	Consol Energy Center	5,321	
9	Friday	May 9	10:00 p.m.	ESPN3	at Spokane Shock	W 52–41	5–3	Spokane Veterans Memorial Arena	8,742	
10	Saturday	May 17	6:00 p.m.	CBS Sports Network	Los Angeles Kiss	W 50–26	6–3	Consol Energy Center	7,762	
11	Saturday	May 24	7:30 p.m.	ESPN3	at Orlando Predators	W 62–61	7–3	CFE Arena	5,008	
12	Saturday	May 31	5:00 p.m.	thisTV	Cleveland Gladiators	W 48–34	8–3	Consol Energy Center	5,348	
13	Saturday	June 7	5:00 p.m.	thisTV	New Orleans VooDoo	W 65–26	9–3	Consol Energy Center	5,419	
14	Saturday	June 14	6:00 p.m.	ESPN3	at Philadelphia Soul	W 57–56	10–3	Wells Fargo Center	7,804	
15	Friday	June 20	7:00 p.m.	thisTV	Iowa Barnstormers	W 57–27	11–3	Consol Energy Center	6,657	
16	Saturday	June 28	7:00 p.m.	CBS Sports Network	at Jacksonville Sharks	W 64–48	12–3	Jacksonville Veterans Memorial Arena	9,304	
17	Monday	July 7	8:30 p.m.	ESPN3	at New Orleans VooDoo	W 48–43	13–3	Smoothie King Center	4,966	
18	Bye									
19	Saturday	July 19	8:05 p.m.	ESPN3	at Iowa Barnstormers	W 59–56	14–3	Wells Fargo Arena	7,557	
20	Saturday	July 26	5:00 p.m.	thisTV	Philadelphia Soul	W 64–34	15–3	Consol Energy Center	9,549	

=== Playoffs ===
Round	Day	Date	Kickoff (ET)	Opponent	Results	Location	Attendance	Report
AC Semifinals	Sunday	August 3	2:00 p.m.	at Orlando Predators	L 48–56	CFE Arena	4,889	

== Roster ==
2014 Pittsburgh Power roster
Quarterbacks: 10 Tommy Grady; 7 Arvell Nelson; Fullbacks: 32 Marlion Jackson; 24 Tommy Taggart; Wide receivers: 12 Tyrone Goard; 3 Shaun Kauleinamoku; 15 Prechae Rodriguez; 18 James Shaw	Offensive linemen: 71 Daverin Geralds; 70 Colin Madison; 77 Kevin Myers; 69 Antonio Narcisse; 75 Keith Newell; Defensive linemen: 44 Maurice Fountain; 8 Jake Killeen; 99 Justin Lawrence; 93 Curtis Young	Linebackers: 2 James Bryant; Defensive backs: 6 Brandon Freeman; 9 Sergio Gilliam; 4 Virgil Gray; 22 Andre Jones; 14 Al Phillips; Kickers: 27 Julian Rauch	Inactive reserve: 19 Jeremy Kelley WR; 13 Latarrius Thomas DB; Injured reserve: 11 Hank Edwards WR; 5 Anthony Hoke DL; 90 Roosevelt Holliday DL; 21 Ricardo Kemp DB; 1 Aaron Lesué WR; 34 Neil Purvis DL; 17 Rodney Wright WR; Other league exempt: -- Kenny Stafford WR; -- Julian Talley WR; -- Eric Norwood DL; Refuse to report: -- Justin Warren DL; Rookies in italics Roster updated July 31, 2014; 24 Active, 13 Inactive → More rosters
