= Kerry Reed =

American gridiron football player (born 1984)

No. 15
- Position: Wide receiver

Personal information
- Born: October 24, 1984 (age 42); Miami, Florida, U.S.
- Listed height: 6 ft 1 in (1.85 m)
- Listed weight: 201 lb (91 kg)

Career information
- High school: Homestead (FL) South Dade
- College: Michigan State
- NFL draft: 2007: undrafted

Career history
- Miami Dolphins (2007); Baltimore Ravens (2008)*; BC Lions (2009–2010)*; Arizona Rattlers (2011–2016)
- * Offseason or practice squad member only

Awards and highlights
- 3× ArenaBowl champion (2012, 2013, 2014); 2× All-KJCCC (2003–2004)

Career AFL statistics
- Receptions: 360
- Receiving yards: 4,244
- Receiving touchdowns: 115
- Total tackles: 102
- Stats at ArenaFan.com
- Stats at Pro Football Reference

Kerry Reed (born October 24, 1984) is an American former professional football player who was a wide receiver in the National Football League (NFL) and Arena Football League (AFL). He was signed by the Miami Dolphins as an undrafted free agent in 2007. He played college football for the Michigan State Spartans.

Reed was also a member of the Baltimore Ravens of the NFL, and the BC Lions of the Canadian Football League (CFL).

== Early life ==
Reed attended South Dade High School in Homestead, Florida and was a letterman in football. As a senior, he was an All-Dade County Honorable Mention selection.
