= 2014 Arena Football League season =

- League: Arena Football League
- Sport: Arena football
- Duration: March 14, 2014 – August 23, 2014

Regular season
- Season champions: Cleveland Gladiators
- Season MVP: Nick Davila, ARZ

League postseason
- American Conference champions: Cleveland Gladiators
- American Conference runners-up: Orlando Predators
- National Conference champions: Arizona Rattlers
- National Conference runners-up: San Jose SaberCats

ArenaBowl XXVII
- Champions: Arizona Rattlers
- Runners-up: Cleveland Gladiators
- Finals MVP: Nick Davila, ARZ

AFL seasons
- ← 2013 2015 →

American: East, South
National: Pacific, West

The 2014 Arena Football League season was the 27th season in the history of the league. The regular season began on March 14, 2014 and ended on July 26, 2014.

== League business ==
=== Teams ===
The city of Anaheim, California was awarded an expansion team on August 15, 2013. The team, named the Los Angeles Kiss, was the first AFL team to call Los Angeles home since the Los Angeles Avengers in 2008. Gene Simmons and Paul Stanley, members of the rock band Kiss, were the owners of the expansion franchise.

Two teams that competed in 2013 suspended operations, (Chicago Rush & Utah Blaze) and their rosters were dispersed throughout the league during a dispersal draft on September 6, 2013.

The Milwaukee Mustangs sold their league membership to Terry Emmert, who then started a new franchise in Portland, Oregon named the Portland Thunder.

=== Television ===
On December 17, 2013 it was announced that ESPN had agreed to a multi-year deal in televising several games, including the ArenaBowl. Additionally, at least 75 games during the season were to be aired on ESPN3, the network's online streaming service. ESPN had owned an equity interest in the former league organization prior to its bankruptcy, and had previously aired games as recently as the 2008 season, prior to the league's hiatus that resulted in the canceled 2009 season.

=== Realignment ===
With teams expanding, relocating and suspending operations, the AFL announced the divisional alignment for 2014 on October 29, 2013. The two conferences had an even number of teams, and were placed in two divisions.

Conference	Division	Teams
American	East	Cleveland Gladiators, Iowa Barnstormers, Philadelphia Soul, Pittsburgh Power
American	South	Jacksonville Sharks, New Orleans VooDoo, Orlando Predators, Tampa Bay Storm
National	Pacific	Portland Thunder, San Jose SaberCats, Spokane Shock
National	West	Arizona Rattlers, Los Angeles Kiss, San Antonio Talons

== Regular season standings ==
American Conference
East Division
Team	W	L	PCT	PF	PA	DIV	CON	Home	Away
^{(1)} Cleveland Gladiators	17	1	.944	991	782	7–1	12–1	9–0	8–1
^{(3)} Pittsburgh Power	15	3	.833	1015	778	6–2	11–2	8–1	7–2
^{(4)} Philadelphia Soul	9	9	.500	1021	949	2–5	7–7	7–2	2–7
Iowa Barnstormers	6	12	.333	848	1046	0–7	2–10	3–6	3–6
South Division
Team	W	L	PCT	PF	PA	DIV	CON	Home	Away
^{(2)} Orlando Predators	11	7	.611	1005	957	7–2	8–6	7–2	4–5
Tampa Bay Storm	8	10	.444	904	953	4–3	7–6	5–4	3–6
Jacksonville Sharks	7	11	.389	879	862	2–5	3–8	4–5	3–6
New Orleans VooDoo	3	15	.167	770	1011	2–5	2–12	1–8	2–7

National Conference
Pacific Division
Team	W	L	PCT	PF	PA	DIV	CON	Home	Away
^{(2)} San Jose SaberCats	13	5	.722	999	723	5–1	9–3	7–2	6–3
^{(3)} Spokane Shock	11	7	.588	957	843	4–2	8–4	6–3	5–4
^{(4)} Portland Thunder	5	13	.278	816	965	0–6	2–11	3–6	2–7
West Division
Team	W	L	PCT	PF	PA	DIV	CON	Home	Away
^{(1)} Arizona Rattlers	15	3	.833	1151	905	4–0	11–2	9–0	6–3
San Antonio Talons^{[a]}	3	15	.167	743	1017	1–3	1–5	0–9	3–6
Los Angeles Kiss	3	15	.167	633	957	1–3	3–9	2–7	1–8

Eight teams qualify for the playoffs: four teams from each conference, of which two are division champions and the other two have the best records of the teams remaining.

- Green indicates clinched playoff berth
- Blue indicates division champion
- Gray indicates division champion and conference's best record

=== Tie-breakers ===
- ^{a} San Antonio finished in second place in the West Division based on their greater point differential in head-to-head competition with Los Angeles.

== Playoffs ==
Conference Semifinals
1	Cleveland	39
4	Philadelphia	37
American Conference
2	Orlando	56
3	Pittsburgh	48
1	Arizona	52
4	Portland	48
National Conference
2	San Jose	55
3	Spokane	28

Conference Championship
1	Cleveland	56
2	Orlando	46
1	Arizona	72
2	San Jose	56

ArenaBowl XXVII
A1	Cleveland	32
N1	Arizona	72

=== Conference semifinals ===
Conference	Date	Kickoff	Away	Score	Home	Game site	Recap
American	August 2	7:00 p.m. EDT	Philadelphia Soul	37–39	Cleveland Gladiators	Quicken Loans Arena	
National	August 2	10:00 p.m. EDT	Spokane Shock	28–55	San Jose SaberCats	SAP Center at San Jose	
American	August 3	2:00 p.m. EDT	Pittsburgh Power	48–56	Orlando Predators	CFE Arena	
National	August 3	6:00 p.m. EDT	Portland Thunder	48–52	Arizona Rattlers	US Airways Center	

=== Conference finals ===
Conference	Date	Kickoff	Away	Score	Home	Game site	Recap
American	August 10	3:00 p.m. EDT	Orlando Predators	46–56	Cleveland Gladiators	Quicken Loans Arena	
National	August 10	8:00 p.m. EDT	San Jose SaberCats	56–72	Arizona Rattlers	US Airways Center	

=== ArenaBowl XXVII ===
Date	Kickoff	Away	Score	Home	Game site	Recap
August 23	8:00 p.m. EDT	Arizona Rattlers	72–32	Cleveland Gladiators	Quicken Loans Arena	

== All-Arena team ==
Offense
Position	First team	Second team
Quarterback	Nick Davila, Arizona	Shane Austin, Cleveland
Fullback	Derrick Ross, Philadelphia	Mykel Benson, San Antonio
Wide receiver	Marco Thomas, Iowa; Rod Windsor, Arizona; Dominick Goodman, Cleveland	Greg Carr, Orlando; Darius Reynolds, Iowa; Donovan Morgan, Los Angeles
Center	Antonio Narcisse, Pittsburgh	Shannon Breen, Cleveland
Offensive lineman	Rich Ranglin, San Jose; Michael Huey, Arizona	Colin Madison, Pittsburgh; Wayne Tribue, Philadelphia

Defense
Position	First team	Second team
Defensive end	James Ruffin, Spokane; Ted Jennings, Philadelphia	Cliff Dukes, Arizona; Mike Lewis, Iowa
Nose guard	Jason Stewart, San Jose	Willie McGinnis, Cleveland
Middle linebacker	Beau Bell, Los Angeles	Francis Maka, San Jose
Jack linebacker	Tanner Varner, Orlando	Bryce Peila, Portland
Defensive back	Marquis Floyd, Arizona; Varmah Sonie, Portland; Marrio Norman, Cleveland	Cameron McGlenn, New Orleans; Kelvin Rodgers, San Antonio; Rayshaun Kizer, Philadelphia

Special teams
Position	First team	Second team
Kicker	Nich Pertuit, San Jose	Julian Rauch, Pittsburgh
Kick returner	Terrance Sanders, Spokane	Larry Beavers, New Orleans
