= 2013 Arizona Rattlers season =

Indoor football season

- Owner: Ron Shurts
- Head coach: Kevin Guy
- Home stadium: US Airways Center

Results
- Record: 15–3
- Division place: 1st NC West
- Playoffs: Won Conference Semifinals (SaberCats) 59–49; Won Conference Championship (Shock) 65–57; Won ArenaBowl XXVI (Soul) 48–39

The 2013 Arizona Rattlers season was the 22nd season for the franchise Arena Football League, coming off of their victory in ArenaBowl XXV. The team was coached by Kevin Guy and played their home games at the US Airways Center. With a 15–3 record, the Rattlers won their fourth consecutive division title to qualify for the playoffs. The Rattlers successfully defended their championship in ArenaBowl XXVI by once again defeating the Philadelphia Soul by a 48–39 score to win their fourth ArenaBowl championship in franchise history.

== Final roster ==
2013 Arizona Rattlers roster
Quarterbacks: 10 Nick Davila; 16 Jason Murrietta; Fullbacks: 32 Odie Armstrong; Wide receivers: 23 Trandon Harvey; 3 Jared Perry; 12 Tysson Poots; 2 Maurice Purify; 15 Kerry Reed; 1 Rod Windsor	Offensive linemen: 75 Cornelius Dixon; 51 Billy Eisenhardt; 69 Michael Huey; Defensive linemen: 91 Antron Dillon; 6 Cliff Dukes; 77 Anttaj Hawthorne; 70 Marcus Pittman	Linebackers: 94 Tyre Glasper; Defensive backs: 11 Arkeith Brown; 19 Marquis Floyd; 4 Virgil Gray; 20 Jeremy Kellem; 9 Da'Mon Merkerson; Kickers: 7 Garrett Lindholm	Injured Reserve: 71 Davon Allen OL; 21 Riley Swanson DB; League Suspended: 73 Dwayne Hendricks DL; 13 Willy Korn QB; -- Craig Ratanamorn K; 60 Jason Shirley OL; Refuse to Report: -- Cody Johnson FB; -- Wes Kemp WR; -- Raymond Webber WR; Other League Exempt: -- Will Blackmon DB; -- Derek Dennis OL; -- James Rogers DB; Inactive reserve: currently vacant; Recallable reassignment: currently vacant; rookies in italics Roster updated August 7, 2013; 23 Active, 13 Inactive

== Standings ==
West Division
Team	W	L	PCT	PF	PA	DIV	CON	Home	Away
z-Arizona Rattlers	15	3	.833	1203	866	4–2	9–3	8–1	7–2
x-Spokane Shock	14	4	.778	1198	896	4–2	8–2	7–2	7–2
x-San Jose SaberCats	13	5	.722	1033	877	3–3	6–4	8–2	5–3
Utah Blaze	7	11	.389	896	988	1–5	3–8	4–5	3–6

z - Clinched division and conference's best record
x - Clinched playoff berth

== Regular season schedule ==
The Rattlers began the season at home against the Philadelphia Soul on March 23 in a rematch of ArenaBowl XXV. They closed the regular season on the road against the Iowa Barnstormers on July 27.

Week	Day	Date	Kickoff	Opponent	Results		Location	Report
Week	Day	Date	Kickoff	Opponent	Score	Record	Location	Report
1	Saturday	March 23	5:00 p.m. MST	Philadelphia Soul	W 66–52	1–0	US Airways Center	
2	Friday	March 29	6:30 p.m. MST	at Utah Blaze	W 77–49	2–0	EnergySolutions Arena	
3	Saturday	April 6	5:30 p.m. MST	San Jose SaberCats	W 73–47	3–0	US Airways Center	
4	Friday	April 12	7:00 p.m. MST	at Spokane Shock	L 49–66	3–1	Spokane Veterans Memorial Arena	
5	Saturday	April 20	6:00 p.m. MST	San Antonio Talons	W 83–40	4–1	US Airways Center	
6	Sunday	April 28	3:00 p.m. MST	Orlando Predators	W 82–42	5–1	US Airways Center	
7	Saturday	May 4	4:00 p.m. MST	at Jacksonville Sharks	W 58–48	6–1	Jacksonville Veterans Memorial Arena	
8	Saturday	May 11	6:00 p.m. MST	Utah Blaze	W 65–49	7–1	US Airways Center	
9	Sunday	May 19	1:00 p.m. MST	at Chicago Rush	W 56–49	8–1	Allstate Arena	
10	Saturday	May 25	6:00 p.m. MST	Iowa Barnstormers	W 70–26	9–1	US Airways Center	
11	Saturday	June 1	1:05 p.m. MST	at Philadelphia Soul	W 64–57	10–1	Wells Fargo Center	
12	Saturday	June 8	5:30 p.m. MST	at San Antonio Talons	W 70–21	11–1	Alamodome	
13	Saturday	June 15	6:00 p.m. MST	Spokane Shock	W 59–42	12–1	US Airways Center	
14	Saturday	June 22	7:30 p.m. MST	at San Jose SaberCats	L 42–72	12–2	HP Pavilion at San Jose	
15	Bye							
16	Saturday	July 6	4:00 p.m. MST	at Orlando Predators	W 84–56	13–2	Amway Center	
17	Saturday	July 13	6:00 p.m. MST	New Orleans VooDoo	W 79–42	14–2	US Airways Center	
18	Saturday	July 20	6:00 p.m. MST	Chicago Rush	L 42–63	14–3	US Airways Center	
19	Saturday	July 27	5:05 p.m. MST	at Iowa Barnstormers	W 84–45	15–3	Wells Fargo Arena	

=== Playoffs ===
Round	Day	Date	Kickoff	Opponent	Results	Location	Report
NC Semifinals	Sunday	August 4	5:00 p.m. MST	San Jose SaberCats	W 59–49	US Airways Center	
NC Championship	Saturday	August 10	6:00 p.m. MST	Spokane Shock	W 65–57	US Airways Center	
ArenaBowl XXVI	Saturday	August 17	10:00 a.m. MST	Philadelphia Soul	W 48–39	Amway Center	
