= 2013 Jacksonville Sharks season =

Arena Football League team season

- Head coach: Les Moss
- Home stadium: Jacksonville Veterans Memorial Arena

Results
- Record: 12–6
- Division place: 1st AC South
- Playoffs: Won Conference semifinals (Storm) 69–62; Lost Conference Championship (Soul) 59–75

The 2013 Jacksonville Sharks season was the fourth season for the franchise in the Arena Football League. The team was coached by Les Moss and played their home games at Jacksonville Veterans Memorial Arena. After winning the South Division for the fourth consecutive year, the Sharks were eliminated in the conference championship game by the Philadelphia Soul for the second straight year.

== Final roster ==
2013 Jacksonville Sharks roster
Quarterbacks: 14 Bernard Morris; 4 Kyle Rowley; Fullbacks: 31 R. J. Bibbs; Wide receivers: 9 Shamar Graves; 3 Jeron Harvey; 5 Jeff Hughley; 11 Josh Philpart; 18 Markee White	Offensive linemen: 78 Thomas Claiborne; 48 Brant Clouser; 74 Cornelius Lewis; 66 Issac Morales; Defensive linemen: 45 Rashaad Duncan; 22 Matt Marcorelle; 99 Ayanga Okpokowuruk; 44 Derrick Summers; 56 Jerry Turner	Linebackers: 15 Jamaal Fudge; 8 Aaron Robbins; Defensive backs: 2 Billy Alford; 6 Tracy Belton; 1 Micheaux Robinson; 10 Terrance Smith WR/DB; Kickers: 7 Marco Capozzoli	Refused to report: -- Johnny Culbreath OL; -- Hank Edwards WR; Injury reserve: 12 R.J. Archer QB; 20 Rendrick Taylor FB; 77 Trevis Turner DL; Other League Exempt: -- Jeremy Kelley WR; -- SirVincent Rogers OL; -- Bobby Sewall WR; Team suspension: -- Jordan Carlson DL; Inactive reserve: 19 London Crawford WR; 95 Mark Crawford DL; Suspended by league: 21 Dusty Bear DL; Recallable reassignment: Currently vacant; Rookies in italics Roster updated August 7, 2013; 24 Active, 12 Inactive

== Standings ==
South Division
Team	W	L	PCT	PF	PA	DIV	CON	Home	Away
z-Jacksonville Sharks	12	6	.667	941	883	6–0	11–0	6–3	6–3
x-Orlando Predators	7	11	.389	965	1032	2–4	5–7	4–5	3–6
x-Tampa Bay Storm	7	11	.389	959	980	2–4	4–6	2–7	5–4
New Orleans VooDoo	5	13	.278	833	1069	2–4	4–6	3–6	2–7

z - Clinched division and conference's best record
x - Clinched playoff berth

== Schedule ==
=== Regular season ===
The Sharks began the season on the road against the Tampa Bay Storm on March 24. Their first home game was on April 12 against the New Orleans VooDoo. They closed the regular season against the Storm at home on July 27.

Week	Day	Date	Kickoff	Opponent	Results		Location	Report
Week	Day	Date	Kickoff	Opponent	Score	Record	Location	Report
1	Saturday	March 23	7:30 p.m. EDT	at Tampa Bay Storm	W 64–55	1–0	Tampa Bay Times Forum	
2	Friday	March 29	7:00 p.m. EDT	at Pittsburgh Power	W 61–35	2–0	Consol Energy Center	
3	Saturday	April 6	7:00 p.m. EDT	at Cleveland Gladiators	W 66–49	3–0	Quicken Loans Arena	
4	Friday	April 12	8:00 p.m. EDT	New Orleans VooDoo	W 76–30	4–0	Jacksonville Veterans Memorial Arena	
5	Friday	April 19	8:00 p.m. EDT	Iowa Barnstormers	W 40–34	5–0	Jacksonville Veterans Memorial Arena	
6	Saturday	April 27	7:05 p.m. EDT	at Philadelphia Soul	W 55–53	6–0	Wells Fargo Center	
7	Saturday	May 4	7:00 p.m. EDT	Arizona Rattlers	L 48–58	6–1	Jacksonville Veterans Memorial Arena	
8	Saturday	May 11	9:30 p.m. EDT	at San Antonio Talons	L 30–34	6–2	Alamodome	
9	Saturday	May 18	7:20 p.m. EDT	San Jose SaberCats	L 36–57	6–3	Jacksonville Veterans Memorial Arena	
10	Saturday	May 25	7:00 p.m. EDT	Orlando Predators	W 44–41	7–3	Amway Center	
11	Saturday	June 1	7:00 p.m. EDT	Pittsburgh Power	W 70–48	8–3	Jacksonville Veterans Memorial Arena	
12	Saturday	June 8	10:00 p.m. EDT	at Spokane Shock	L 41–76	8–4	Spokane Veterans Memorial Arena	
13	Saturday	June 15	9:00 p.m. EDT	at Utah Blaze	L 55–62	8–5	EnergySolutions Arena	
14	Saturday	June 22	7:00 p.m. EDT	Cleveland Gladiators	W 43–41	9–5	Jacksonville Veterans Memorial Arena	
15	Saturday	June 29	7:00 p.m. EDT	Orlando Predators	W 62–55	10–5	Jacksonville Veterans Memorial Arena	
16	Bye							
17	Saturday	July 13	7:00 p.m. EDT	Spokane Shock	L 40–62	10–6	Jacksonville Veterans Memorial Arena	
18	Saturday	July 20	8:00 p.m. EDT	at New Orleans VooDoo	W 58–49	11–6	New Orleans Arena	
19	Saturday	July 27	7:00 p.m. EDT	Tampa Bay Storm	W 52–44	12–6	Jacksonville Veterans Memorial Arena	

=== Playoffs ===
Round	Day	Date	Kickoff	Opponent	Results	Location	Report
AC Semifinals	Saturday	August 3	7:00 p.m. EDT	Tampa Bay Storm	W 69–62	Jacksonville Veterans Memorial Arena	
AC Championship	Saturday	August 10	7:00 p.m. EDT	Philadelphia Soul	L 59–75	Jacksonville Veterans Memorial Arena	
