= 2013 Philadelphia Soul season =

Arena Football League team season

- Head coach: Clint Dolezel
- Home stadium: Wells Fargo Center

Results
- Record: 12–6
- Division place: 1st AC East
- Playoffs: Won Conference semifinals (Predators) 59–55; Won Conference Championship (Sharks) 75–59; Lost ArenaBowl XXVI (Rattlers) 39–48

The 2013 Philadelphia Soul season was the eighth season for the franchise in the Arena Football League. The team was coached by Clint Dolezel and played their home games at the Wells Fargo Center. The Soul captured another division championship, and went on to reach the ArenaBowl for the second consecutive season. However, they were once again defeated by the Arizona Rattlers in ArenaBowl XXVI by a 48–39 score.

== Final roster ==
2013 Philadelphia Soul roster
Quarterbacks: 9 Dustin Almond; 5 Dan Raudabaugh; Fullbacks: 4 Derrick Ross; Wide receivers: 1 Larry Brackins; 11 Tyrone Jones; 19 Ryan McDaniel; 83 Emery Sammons; 81 Andrae Thurman	Offensive linemen: 52 Ryan Blaszczyk; 55 Brennen Carvalho; 78 Christian Johnson; 95 Jason Jones; Defensive linemen: 99 Morkeith Brown; 94 Tyron Hurst; 98 Ko Quaye; 12 Bryan Robinson	Linebackers: 92 Calvin Fance; 18 Joe Goosby; 6 Brandon Perkins; Defensive backs: 7 Rayshaun Kizer; 22 David Richardson; 25 James Romain; 23 LaRico Stevenson; Kickers: 13 Carlos Martinez; 3 Wayden Mills	Injured reserve: 8 Dustin Barno DL; 2 Melik Brown OL/DL; -- Carlos Campbell DB; 72 Sioeli Fakalata OL; 15 Alvance Robinson WR; League suspension: -- Chris Frank LB; Team suspension: 60 Evan Epstein OL; Other League Exempt: 9 Kent Richardson DB; Inactive reserve: Currently vacant; Refuse to Report: Currently vacant; Recallable reassignment: Currently vacant; Rookies in italics Roster updated August 14, 2013; 24 Active, 8 Inactive

== Standings ==
East Division
Team	W	L	PCT	PF	PA	DIV	CON	Home	Away
y-Philadelphia Soul	12	6	.667	1052	839	2–2	6–3	5–4	7–2
Cleveland Gladiators	4	14	.222	847	1047	2–2	3–7	3–6	1–8
Pittsburgh Power	4	14	.222	726	1014	2–2	4–8	1–8	3–6

y - Clinched division

== Schedule ==
=== Regular season ===
The Soul began the season on the road against the Arizona Rattlers on March 23, in a rematch of ArenaBowl XXV. Their first home game was on April 20 when they faced the Cleveland Gladiators. They closed the regular season on July 27, on the road against the San Antonio Talons.

Week	Day	Date	Kickoff	Opponent	Results		Location	Report
Week	Day	Date	Kickoff	Opponent	Score	Record	Location	Report
1	Saturday	March 23	8:00 p.m. EDT	at Arizona Rattlers	L 52–66	0–1	US Airways Center	
2	Bye							
3	Saturday	April 6	7:00 p.m. EDT	at Orlando Predators	W 61–33	1–1	Amway Center	
4	Saturday	April 13	7:00 p.m. EDT	at Iowa Barnstormers	W 54–43	2–1	Wells Fargo Arena	
5	Saturday	April 20	7:05 p.m. EDT	Cleveland Gladiators	L 57–64 (OT)	2–2	Wells Fargo Center	
6	Saturday	April 27	7:05 p.m. EDT	Jacksonville Sharks	L 53–55	2–3	Wells Fargo Center	
7	Saturday	May 4	8:00 p.m. EDT	at Chicago Rush	W 72–41	3–3	Allstate Arena	
8	Saturday	May 11	7:05 p.m. EDT	Pittsburgh Power	L 48–53	3–4	Wells Fargo Center	
9	Saturday	May 18	7:00 p.m. EDT	Orlando Predators	W 61–51	4–4	Wells Fargo Center	
10	Saturday	May 25	7:30 p.m. EDT	at Tampa Bay Storm	W 73–55	5–4	Tampa Bay Times Forum	
11	Saturday	June 1	4:05 p.m. EDT	Arizona Rattlers	L 57–64	5–5	Wells Fargo Center	
12	Saturday	June 8	7:05 p.m. EDT	New Orleans VooDoo	W 65–56	6–5	Wells Fargo Center	
13	Saturday	June 15	7:00 p.m. EDT	at Pittsburgh Power	W 59–21	7–5	Consol Energy Center	
14	Saturday	June 22	7:05 p.m. EDT	Iowa Barnstormers	W 54–30	8–5	Wells Fargo Center	
15	Saturday	June 29	7:00 p.m. EDT	at Cleveland Gladiators	W 66–57	9–5	Quicken Loans Arena	
16	Saturday	July 6	7:05 p.m. EDT	Chicago Rush	W 56–28	10–5	Wells Fargo Center	
17	Friday	July 12	7:35 p.m. EDT	Utah Blaze	W 69–39	11–5	Wells Fargo Center	
18	Saturday	July 20	10:30 p.m. EDT	at San Jose SaberCats	W 65–43	12–5	HP Pavilion at San Jose	
19	Saturday	July 27	9:00 p.m. EDT	at San Antonio Talons	L 28–42	12–6	Alamodome	

=== Playoffs ===
Round	Day	Date	Kickoff	Opponent	Results	Location	Report
AC Semifinals	Saturday	August 3	7:05 p.m. EDT	Orlando Predators	W 59–55	Wells Fargo Center	
AC Championship	Saturday	August 10	7:00 p.m. EDT	at Jacksonville Sharks	W 75–59	Jacksonville Veterans Memorial Arena	
ArenaBowl XXVI	Saturday	August 17	1:00 p.m. EDT	Arizona Rattlers	L 39–48	Amway Center	
