= Antron Dillon =

American football player (born 1985)

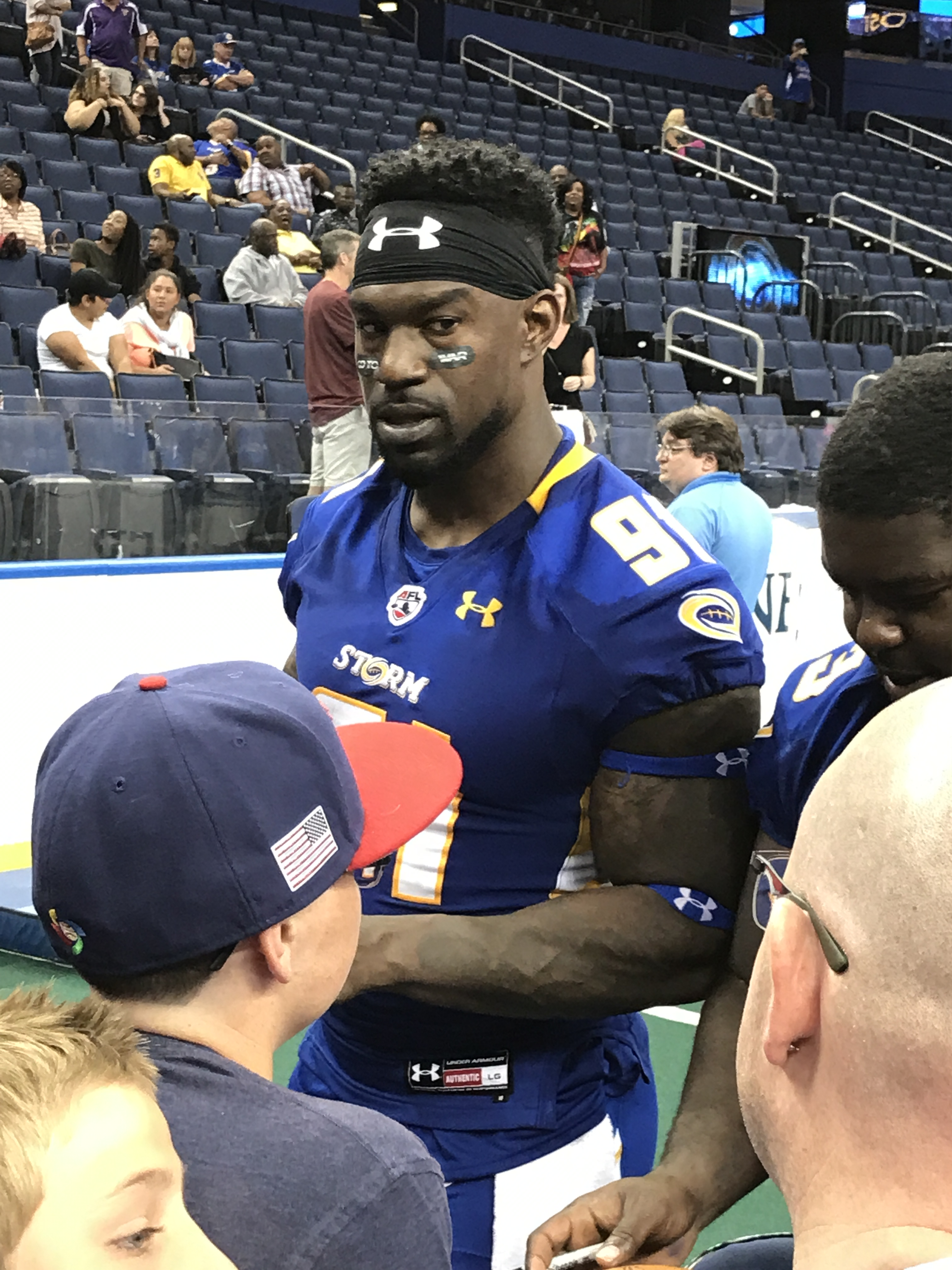
- Dillon with the Tampa Bay Storm in 2017

No. 3, 20, 91
- Position: Defensive lineman

Personal information
- Born: June 7, 1985 (age 41); Hammond, Louisiana, U.S.
- Listed height: 6 ft 5 in (1.96 m)
- Listed weight: 280 lb (127 kg)

Career information
- High school: Independence (LA)
- College: North Alabama
- NFL draft: 2011: undrafted

Career history
- Arizona Rattlers (2012–2013); Portland Thunder (2014); Los Angeles KISS (2015); Jacksonville Sharks (2016); Tampa Bay Storm (2017); Florida Tarpons (2018); Atlantic City Blackjacks (2019)

Awards and highlights
- 2× ArenaBowl champion (2012, 2013)

Career AFL statistics
- Tackles: 101.5
- Sacks: 13
- Forced fumbles: 4
- Stats at ArenaFan.com

Antron Dwayne Dillon (born June 7, 1985) is an American former professional football defensive lineman who played in the Arena Football League (AFL). He played college football at the University of North Alabama. He was a member of the Arizona Rattlers, Portland Thunder, Los Angeles KISS, Jacksonville Sharks, Tampa Bay Storm, Florida Tarpons, and Atlantic City Blackjacks.

== Early life ==
Dillon attended Independence High School in Independence, Louisiana.

College recruiting
| Name | Hometown | School | Height | Weight | Commit date |
|---|---|---|---|---|---|
| Antron Dillon; LB | Independence, Louisiana | Independence High School | 6 ft 5 in (1.96 m) | 210 lb (95 kg) | Jan 3, 2003 |
| Antron Dillon; LB | Recruit ratings: Scout: Rivals: 247Sports: | | | | |
Overall recruit ranking: Scout: 89 (LB) Rivals: -- (LB), -- (LA)
Note: In many cases, Scout, Rivals, 247Sports, On3, and ESPN may conflict in their listings of height and weight.; In these cases, the average was taken. ESPN grades are on a 100-point scale.; Sources: "Vanderbilt Football Commitment List". Rivals.; "Vanderbilt College Football Recruiting Commits". Scout.; "Scout.com Team Recruiting Rankings". Scout.; "2003 Team Ranking". Rivals.com.

== College career ==
In January 2003, Dillon committed to play football for the Vanderbilt Commodores. Dillon transferred to Southwest Mississippi Community College for two seasons, before transferring to North Alabama. Dillon played with the Lions in 2007, then after a two-year gap, played again for the Lions in 2010.

== Professional career ==
=== Arizona Rattlers ===
In October 2012, Dillon was assigned to the Arizona Rattlers on a two-year deal. Dillon helped the Rattlers to two ArenaBowl championships in 2013 and 2014.

=== Portland Thunder ===
Dillon was assigned to the Portland Thunder during the 2013 Expansion Draft.

=== Los Angeles KISS ===
In February 2015, Dillon was assigned to the Los Angeles KISS.

=== Jacksonville Sharks ===
In March 2016, Dillon was assigned to the Jacksonville Sharks.

=== Tampa Bay Storm ===
On January 12, 2017, Dillon was assigned to the Tampa Bay Storm. The Storm folded in December 2017.

=== Florida Tarpons ===
Dillon signed with the Florida Tarpons of the American Arena League on January 22, 2018.

=== Atlantic City Blackjacks ===
On March 18, 2019, Dillon was assigned to the Atlantic City Blackjacks.
