= 2013 Tampa Bay Storm season =

Arena Football League team season

- Head coach: Dave Ewart
- Home stadium: Tampa Bay Times Forum

Results
- Record: 7–11
- Division place: 3rd AC South
- Playoffs: Lost Conference semifinals (Sharks) 62–69

The 2013 Tampa Bay Storm season was the 26th season for the franchise in the Arena Football League, and their 22nd in the Tampa Bay area. The team was coached by Dave Ewart and played their home games at the Tampa Bay Times Forum. The Storm lost their last seven regular season games but were still able to qualify for the playoffs. However, they were eliminated in the conference semifinals by the Jacksonville Sharks by a score of 69–62.

== Final roster ==
2013 Tampa Bay Storm roster
| Quarterbacks: 17 Shane Boyd; 8 Randy Hippeard; Fullbacks: 12 Terrence Royal; Wide receivers: 13 Jason Chery; 15 Pete Romeo; 82 Tyrece Gaines; 2 Joe Hills; 10 Michael Lindsey; 3 DeAngelo Woodie | Offensive linemen: 44 Bruce McCaleb; 77 Nevin McCaskill; 68 Alfred McCullough; Defensive linemen: 49 Josh Brown; 54 Paul Griffin; 91 Tremaine Johnson; 67 Dre Moore; 92 Pernell Phillips; 55 R. J. Roberts; 72 DeMarcus Tyler | Linebackers: 19 Rashad Barksdale; 56 Rodney Beamon; 21 Jean Fanor; 31 James Harrell; Defensive backs: 16 Vance Cuff; 4 Chris Smith; 27 Donald Smith; Kickers: 6 Juan Bongarra | Refuse to report: 56 David Akinniyi DL; -- Travis Williams DB; Other League Exempt: -- Junior Aumavae DL; 82 Greg Ellingson WR; 11 Justin Hilton WR; Injury reserve: 44 Terence Crosby OL; 14 De'Audra Dix DB; 59 John-Kevin Dolce LB; 5 Adrian McPherson QB; 75 Maurice Robinson OL; 67 Brad Serini DL; 44 Jeff Tow-Arnett FB; League suspension: 49 Claude Davis DL; 3 Jerrell Gavins DB; -- James Hardy WR; Inactive reserve: Currently vacant; Rookies in italics Roster updated August 2, 2013; 27 Active, 15 Inactive |

== Standings ==
South Division
| Team | W | L | PCT | PF | PA | DIV | CON | Home | Away |
| z-Jacksonville Sharks | 12 | 6 | .667 | 941 | 883 | 6–0 | 11–0 | 6–3 | 6–3 |
| x-Orlando Predators | 7 | 11 | .389 | 965 | 1032 | 2–4 | 5–7 | 4–5 | 3–6 |
| x-Tampa Bay Storm | 7 | 11 | .389 | 959 | 980 | 2–4 | 4–6 | 2–7 | 5–4 |
| New Orleans VooDoo | 5 | 13 | .278 | 833 | 1069 | 2–4 | 4–6 | 3–6 | 2–7 |

z - Clinched division and conference's best record
x - Clinched playoff berth

== Schedule ==
=== Regular season ===
The Storm began the season by hosting the Jacksonville Sharks on March 23. They closed the regular season against the Sharks in Jacksonville on July 27.

| Week | Day | Date | Kickoff | Opponent | Results | | Location | Report |
| Week | Day | Date | Kickoff | Opponent | Score | Record | Location | Report |
|---|---|---|---|---|---|---|---|---|
| 1 | Saturday | March 23 | 7:30 p.m. EDT | Jacksonville Sharks | L 55–64 | 0–1 | Tampa Bay Times Forum | |
| 2 | Saturday | March 30 | 7:30 p.m. EDT | Cleveland Gladiators | W 69–47 | 1–1 | Tampa Bay Times Forum | |
| 3 | Saturday | April 6 | 10:00 p.m. EDT | at Utah Blaze | W 77–65 | 2–1 | EnergySolutions Arena | |
| 4 | Friday | April 12 | 8:00 p.m. EDT | San Antonio Talons | L 36–52 | 2–2 | Tampa Bay Times Forum | |
| 5 | Saturday | April 20 | 7:00 p.m. EDT | at Orlando Predators | W 53–35 | 3–2 | Amway Center | |
| 6 | Saturday | April 27 | 10:00 p.m. EDT | at Spokane Shock | W 70–62 | 4–2 | Spokane Veterans Memorial Arena | |
| 7 | Saturday | May 4 | 9:00 p.m. EDT | New Orleans VooDoo | W 63–32 | 5–2 | Tampa Bay Times Forum | |
| 8 | Friday | May 10 | 10:30 p.m. EDT | at San Jose SaberCats | L 34–64 | 5–3 | HP Pavilion at San Jose | |
| 9 | Saturday | May 18 | 7:00 p.m. EDT | at Pittsburgh Power | W 62–34 | 6–3 | Consol Energy Center | |
| 10 | Saturday | May 25 | 7:30 p.m. EDT | Philadelphia Soul | L 55–73 | 6–4 | Tampa Bay Times Forum | |
| 11 | Saturday | June 1 | 8:05 p.m. EDT | at Iowa Barnstormers | W 65–62 | 7–4 | Wells Fargo Arena | |
| 12 | Saturday | June 8 | 7:30 p.m. EDT | Orlando Predators | L 48–55 | 7–5 | Tampa Bay Times Forum | |
| 13 | Saturday | June 15 | 8:00 p.m. EDT | at New Orleans VooDoo | L 51–54 | 7–6 | New Orleans Arena | |
| 14 | Saturday | June 22 | 7:30 p.m. EDT | Chicago Rush | L 49–50 | 7–7 | Tampa Bay Times Forum | |
| 15 | Bye | | | | | | | |
| 16 | Saturday | July 6 | 7:30 p.m. EDT | Spokane Shock | L 49–63 | 7–8 | Tampa Bay Times Forum | |
| 17 | Saturday | July 13 | 8:30 p.m. EDT | at San Antonio Talons | L 42–68 | 7–9 | Alamodome | |
| 18 | Saturday | July 20 | 7:30 p.m. EDT | Pittsburgh Power | L 37–48 | 7–10 | Tampa Bay Times Forum | |
| 19 | Saturday | July 27 | 7:00 p.m. EDT | at Jacksonville Sharks | L 44–52 | 7–11 | Jacksonville Veterans Memorial Arena | |

=== Playoffs ===
| Round | Day | Date | Kickoff | Opponent | Results | Location | Report |
|---|---|---|---|---|---|---|---|
| AC Semifinals | Saturday | August 3 | 7:00 p.m. EDT | at Jacksonville Sharks | L 62–69 | Jacksonville Veterans Memorial Arena | |
