= 2013 Cleveland Gladiators season =

Arena Football League team season

- Head coach: Steve Thonn
- Home stadium: Quicken Loans Arena

Results
- Record: 4–14
- Division place: 2nd AC East
- Playoffs: did not qualify

The 2013 Cleveland Gladiators season was the 14th season for the franchise in the Arena Football League, and the fifth while in Cleveland. The team was coached by Steve Thonn and played their home games at the Quicken Loans Arena.

== Final roster ==
2013 Cleveland Gladiators roster
Quarterbacks: 14 Nasir Turner; 17 Danny Southwick; Fullbacks: 91 Clay Harrell; Wide receivers: 2 Carlese Franklin; 4 Donald Fusilier; -- Tom Gilson; 16 Dominick Goodman; 6 Thyron Lewis; 10 Cody Pearcy	Offensive linemen: 74 Shannon Breen; 77 Ron Haver; 79 Kitt O'Brien; 75 Chad Schofield; Player 21 nasir Defensive linemen: 96 Randy Colling; 93 Danny Farr; 33 Jacob Hardwick; 44 Todd Storm	Linebackers: 90 Darren Branch; Defensive backs: 21 Brandon Anderson; 1 Marrio Norman; 5 Joe Phinisee; 9 Lenny Wicks; Kickers: 22 Craig Camay	Injury reserve: 71 C. J. Cobb DL; 99 Kris Cooke DL; 12 Jamar Howard WR; 3 LaRoche Jackson DB; 4 Aaron Pettrey K; 55 Derik Steiner FB; 7 Brian Zbydniewski QB; Other league exempt: Currently vacant; Refused to report: -- Marcus Brown DB; -- Anthony Degrate LB; 91 Lindsey Witten DL; League suspension: 5 Brandon Denson LB; Inactive reserve: 8 Johnathan Wilson WR; Recallable reassignment: Currently vacant; Rookies in italics Roster updated July 25, 2013; 23 Active, 12 Inactive

== Standings ==
East Division
Team	W	L	PCT	PF	PA	DIV	CON	Home	Away
y-Philadelphia Soul	12	6	.667	1052	839	2–2	6–3	5–4	7–2
Cleveland Gladiators	4	14	.222	847	1047	2–2	3–7	3–6	1–8
Pittsburgh Power	4	14	.222	726	1014	2–2	4–8	1–8	3–6

y - Clinched division

== Regular season schedule ==
The Gladiators began the season by hosting the Spokane Shock on March 24. They closed the regular season on July 27, on the road against the Utah Blaze.

Week	Day	Date	Kickoff	Opponent	Results		Location	Report
Week	Day	Date	Kickoff	Opponent	Score	Record	Location	Report
1	Sunday	March 24	1:00 p.m. EDT	Spokane Shock	L 41–67	0–1	Quicken Loans Arena	
2	Saturday	March 30	7:30 p.m. EDT	at Tampa Bay Storm	L 47–69	0–2	Tampa Bay Times Forum	
3	Saturday	April 6	7:00 p.m. EDT	Jacksonville Sharks	L 49–66	0–3	Quicken Loans Arena	
4	Bye							
5	Saturday	April 20	7:05 p.m. EDT	at Philadelphia Soul	W 64–57 (OT)	1–3	Wells Fargo Center	
6	Saturday	April 27	7:00 p.m. EDT	Utah Blaze	L 40–57	1–4	Quicken Loans Arena	
7	Saturday	May 4	10:30 p.m. EDT	at San Jose SaberCats	L 36–56	1–5	HP Pavilion at San Jose	
8	Saturday	May 11	7:00 p.m. EDT	Chicago Rush	W 53–50	2–5	Quicken Loans Arena	
9	Saturday	May 18	7:00 p.m. EDT	San Antonio Talons	L 33–57	2–6	Quicken Loans Arena	
10	Saturday	May 25	7:00 p.m. EDT	at Pittsburgh Power	L 44–55	2–7	Consol Energy Center	
11	Saturday	June 1	8:00 p.m. EDT	at New Orleans VooDoo	L 40–69	2–8	New Orleans Arena	
12	Friday	June 7	7:30 p.m. EDT	Iowa Barnstormers	L 33–37	2–9	Quicken Loans Arena	
13	Saturday	June 15	7:00 p.m. EDT	at Orlando Predators	L 55–62	2–10	Amway Center	
14	Saturday	June 22	7:00 p.m. EDT	at Jacksonville Sharks	L 41–43	2–11	Jacksonville Veterans Memorial Arena	
15	Saturday	June 29	7:00 p.m. EDT	Philadelphia Soul	L 57–66	2–12	Quicken Loans Arena	
16	Saturday	July 6	7:00 p.m. EDT	Pittsburgh Power	W 71–58	3–12	Quicken Loans Arena	
17	Saturday	July 13	8:00 p.m. EDT	at Chicago Rush	L 32–68	3–13	BMO Harris Bank Center	
18	Saturday	July 20	7:00 p.m. EDT	Orlando Predators	W 65–62	4–13	Quicken Loans Arena	
19	Saturday	July 27	9:00 p.m. EDT	at Utah Blaze	W 46–48	4–14	EnergySolutions Arena	
