= 2013 Pittsburgh Power season =

Season of American football

- Head coach: Derek Stingley
- Home stadium: Consol Energy Center

Results
- Record: 4–14
- Division place: 3rd AC East
- Playoffs: Did not qualify

The 2013 Pittsburgh Power season was the third season for the franchise in the Arena Football League. The team was coached by Derek Stingley and played their home games at the Consol Energy Center.

== Final roster ==
2013 Pittsburgh Power roster
| Quarterbacks: 10 Shane Austin; 12 Steven Sheffield; 13 Derek Cassidy; Fullbacks: 31 Kirby Griffin; Wide receivers: 1 Mike Washington; 14 Tyler Beiler; 19 Julian Talley; 28 Tyrone Collins | Offensive linemen: 56 Beau Elliott; 57 Michael Diaz; 64 Greg Niland; 69 Jason Thomas; 71 Daverin Geralds; Defensive linemen: 40 Darius Powell; 48 Michael Robinson; 93 Curtis Young; 94 Willie McGinnis | Linebackers: 11 Gary Butler; 17 Alvin Ray Jackson; Defensive backs: 2 Christian Wise; 5 Chris LeFlore; 6 Brandon Freeman; 9 Sergio Gilliam; 21 Ricardo Kemp; Kickers: 27 Julian Rauch | Injured reserve: -- Wes Lyons WR; 15 James Robinson WR; 18 Oderick Turner WR; 34 Tyre Young DL; 52 Dominie Pittman DL; 64 Daryl Kurtz OL; Rookies in italics Roster updated July 24, 2013 |

== Standings ==
East Division
| Team | W | L | PCT | PF | PA | DIV | CON | Home | Away |
| y-Philadelphia Soul | 12 | 6 | .667 | 1052 | 839 | 2–2 | 6–3 | 5–4 | 7–2 |
| Cleveland Gladiators | 4 | 14 | .222 | 847 | 1047 | 2–2 | 3–7 | 3–6 | 1–8 |
| Pittsburgh Power | 4 | 14 | .222 | 726 | 1014 | 2–2 | 4–8 | 1–8 | 3–6 |

y - Clinched division

== Regular season schedule ==
The Power began the season at home against the Utah Blaze on March 23. They closed the regular season on July 26, on the road against the Spokane Shock.

| Week | Day | Date | Kickoff (ET) | TV | Opponent | Results | | Location | Report |
| Week | Day | Date | Kickoff (ET) | TV | Opponent | Score | Record | Location | Report |
|---|---|---|---|---|---|---|---|---|---|
| 1 | Saturday | March 23 | 6:00 p.m. | thisTV | Utah Blaze | L 33–64 | 0–1 | Consol Energy Center | |
| 2 | Friday | March 29 | 7:00 p.m. | thisTV | Jacksonville Sharks | L 35–61 | 0–2 | Consol Energy Center | |
| 3 | Bye | | | | | | | | |
| 4 | Sunday | April 14 | 4:00 p.m. | | at Chicago Rush | L 14–45 | 0–3 | Allstate Arena | |
| 5 | Friday | April 19 | 8:30 p.m. | | at New Orleans VooDoo | W 46–43 | 1–3 | New Orleans Arena | |
| 6 | Sunday | April 28 | 2:00 p.m. | thisTV | San Antonio Talons | L 37–42 | 1–4 | Consol Energy Center | |
| 7 | Saturday | May 4 | 7:00 p.m. | thisTV | Orlando Predators | L 38–52 | 1–5 | Consol Energy Center | |
| 8 | Saturday | May 11 | 7:05 p.m. | | at Philadelphia Soul | W 53–48 | 2–5 | Wells Fargo Center | |
| 9 | Saturday | May 18 | 7:00 p.m. | | Tampa Bay Storm | L 34–62 | 2–6 | Consol Energy Center | |
| 10 | Saturday | May 25 | 7:00 p.m. | thisTV | Cleveland Gladiators | W 55–44 | 3–6 | Consol Energy Center | |
| 11 | Saturday | June 1 | 7:00 p.m. | | at Jacksonville Sharks | L 48–70 | 3–7 | Jacksonville Veterans Memorial Arena | |
| 12 | Saturday | June 8 | 10:30 p.m. | | at San Jose SaberCats | L 54–68 | 3–8 | HP Pavilion at San Jose | |
| 13 | Saturday | June 15 | 7:00 p.m. | thisTV | Philadelphia Soul | L 21–59 | 3–9 | Consol Energy Center | |
| 14 | Saturday | June 22 | 7:00 p.m. | | at Orlando Predators | L 35–50 | 3–10 | Amway Center | |
| 15 | Saturday | June 29 | 7:00 p.m. | | New Orleans VooDoo | L 54–59 | 3–11 | Consol Energy Center | |
| 16 | Saturday | July 6 | 7:00 p.m. | | at Cleveland Gladiators | L 58–71 | 3–12 | Quicken Loans Arena | |
| 17 | Saturday | July 13 | 7:00 p.m. | CBS Sports Network | San Jose SaberCats | L 20–78 | 3–13 | Consol Energy Center | |
| 18 | Saturday | July 20 | 7:30 p.m. | | at Tampa Bay Storm | W 48–37 | 4–13 | Tampa Bay Times Forum | |
| 19 | Friday | July 26 | 10:00 p.m. | | at Spokane Shock | L 43–61 | 4–14 | Spokane Veterans Memorial Arena | |
