= 2013 Iowa Barnstormers season =

Arena Football League team season

- Head coach: Mike Hohensee
- Home stadium: Wells Fargo Arena

Results
- Record: 6–12
- Division place: 3rd NC Central
- Playoffs: Did not qualify

The 2013 Iowa Barnstormers season was the 13th season for the franchise, and the ninth in the Arena Football League. The team was coached by Mike Hohensee and played their home games at Wells Fargo Arena.

== Final roster ==
2013 Iowa Barnstormers roster
Quarterbacks: 11 J. J. Raterink; 10 Brian Reader; Fullbacks: 41 Kai Brown; Wide receivers: 4 Marcus Harris; 7 Darius Reynolds; 22 Jesse Schmidt; 2 Collin Taylor; 3 Marco Thomas	Offensive linemen: 60 Travis Miller; 77 Mike Garrity; 79 Anthony Parker; 72 Dace Richardson; Defensive linemen: 53 Mike Lewis; 32 Odrick Ray; 99 William Stokes	Linebackers: 50 Damario Ambrose; 20 Rony Nelson; Defensive backs: 21 Ter'Ran Benton; 8 De'Mon Glanton; 1 Erick McIntosh; 6 Jason Simpson; Kickers: 14 Ross Gornall	Injury Reserve: 57 Darnell Carter LB; 23 Rodney Gnat DL; 5 John Mohring LB; 70 Jayson Palmgren OL; 9 Fabrizio Scaccia K; 17 Matangi Tonga DL; 12 Mike Williams DB; Refused to report: -- Josue Paul WR; -- Josh Wilkins DB; League Suspension: -- Bryan Boemer OL; -- Chris Gould K; Team Suspension: Currently vacant; Recallable reassignment: Currently vacant; Rookies in italics; Roster updated July 23, 2013; 22 Active, 11 Inactive

== Standings ==
Central Division
Team	W	L	PCT	PF	PA	DIV	CON	Home	Away
y-Chicago Rush	10	8	.556	973	947	2–2	5–5	3–5	7–3
San Antonio Talons	10	8	.556	782	884	2–2	3–8	4–5	6–3
Iowa Barnstormers	6	12	.333	827	913	2–2	3–7	2–7	4–5

y - Clinched division

== Regular season schedule ==
The Barnstormers began the season on the road against the Chicago Rush on March 23. Their first home game was April 5 against the Spokane Shock. They closed the regular season against the Arizona Rattlers at home on July 27.

Week	Day	Date	Kickoff	Opponent	Results		Location	Report
Week	Day	Date	Kickoff	Opponent	Score	Record	Location	Report
1	Saturday	March 23	7:00 PM	at Chicago Rush	W 63–41	1–0	Allstate Arena	
2	Saturday	March 30	6:00 PM	at New Orleans VooDoo	W 48–34	2–0	New Orleans Arena	
3	Friday	April 5	7:05 PM	Spokane Shock	L 43–66	2–1	Wells Fargo Arena	
4	Saturday	April 13	6:00 PM	Philadelphia Soul	L 43–54	2–2	Wells Fargo Arena	
5	Friday	April 19	7:00 PM	at Jacksonville Sharks	L 34–40	2–3	Jacksonville Veterans Memorial Arena	
6	Friday	April 26	7:05 PM	Chicago Rush	L 63–64 (OT)	2–4	Wells Fargo Arena	
7	Friday	May 3	7:30 PM	at San Antonio Talons	W 48–36	3–4	Alamodome	
8	Saturday	May 11	7:05 PM	New Orleans VooDoo	W 62–16	4–4	Wells Fargo Arena	
9	Saturday	May 18	8:00 PM	at Utah Blaze	L 34–43	4–5	EnergySolutions Arena	
10	Saturday	May 25	8:00 PM	at Arizona Rattlers	L 26–70	4–6	US Airways Center	
11	Saturday	June 1	7:05 PM	Tampa Bay Storm	L 62–65	4–7	Wells Fargo Arena	
12	Friday	June 7	6:30 PM	at Cleveland Gladiators	W 37–33	5–7	Quicken Loans Arena	
13	Saturday	June 15	7:05 PM	San Jose SaberCats	W 73–68	6–7	Wells Fargo Arena	
14	Saturday	June 22	6:05 PM	at Philadelphia Soul	L 30–54	6–8	Wells Fargo Center	
15	Saturday	June 29	7:05 PM	San Antonio Talons	L 34–35	6–9	Wells Fargo Arena	
16	Bye							
17	Saturday	July 13	6:00 PM	at Orlando Predators	L 41–55	6–10	Amway Center	
18	Saturday	July 20	7:05 PM	Utah Blaze	L 41–55	6–11	Wells Fargo Arena	
19	Saturday	July 27	7:05 PM	Arizona Rattlers	L 45–84	6–12	Wells Fargo Arena	
