= 2013 San Antonio Talons season =

Arena Football League team season

- Head coach: Lee Johnson
- Home stadium: Alamodome

Results
- Record: 10–8
- Division place: 2nd NC Central
- Playoffs: Did not qualify

The 2013 San Antonio Talons season was the 13th season for the franchise, the fourth in the Arena Football League, and the second in San Antonio, Texas. The team was coached by Lee Johnson and played its home games at the Alamodome. The Talons finished the regular season with a 10–8 record but missed the playoffs after losing a tiebreaker with the Chicago Rush. During the season, San Antonio used nine different quarterbacks, with six missing time due to injuries.

== Quarterback carousel ==
The San Antonio Talons opened the 2013 season with 13-year veteran John Dutton as their starting quarterback. Dutton suffered a season-ending torn achilles tendon injury in the team's second game against the Chicago Rush and was replaced by backup Rohan Davey, who was appearing in his first Arena Football League action since 2008. Davey also suffered a serious ankle injury during the loss, leaving the Talons without a healthy quarterback. Prior to Week 3, San Antonio signed Nate Davis, who had played for the Kansas City Command in 2012 and was then the starting quarterback for the Amarillo Venom of the Lone Star Football League. The Talons also signed Nick Hill, who had most recently played for the Tampa Bay Storm. Hill made his first start against his former team, throwing four touchdown passes to lead San Antonio to its first victory of the season. Davis subsequently returned to Amarillo, leaving Hill as the club's primary quarterback. The following week, the Talons were defeated 83–40 by the defending ArenaBowl champion Arizona Rattlers, but Hill rebounded by leading San Antonio to a 42–37 victory over the Pittsburgh Power before suffering an injury that sidelined him the following game. To replace Hill, the Talons signed Zach Frazer, who started in Week 7 against the Iowa Barnstormers. Frazer completed 19 of 40 passes for 225 yards with three touchdowns and three interceptions in the loss, but sustained shoulder and knee injuries that ended his season. Hill returned the following week and guided San Antonio to consecutive victories over the Jacksonville Sharks and Cleveland Gladiators before suffering another season-ending injury in Week 10 against the Spokane Shock after reinjuring his surgically repaired left ankle. The Talons then turned to former Florida State quarterback Xavier Lee, who was on the roster as a wide receiver. Lee replaced the injured Hill against Spokane, completing 22 of 48 passes for 237 yards with four touchdowns and one interception in a 61–48 loss. Lee made his first start at quarterback for the Talons the following week against the Utah Blaze, becoming the fourth different quarterback to start for San Antonio in 2013, and led the team to a 42–41 victory that improved its record to 5–5. Before Week 12, San Antonio signed Nick Fanuzzi. The following week against Arizona, Fanuzzi relieved Lee, completing 9 of 25 passes for 108 yards with one touchdown and four interceptions. He became the sixth quarterback to take snaps for the Talons during the season, and the appearance proved to be his only one with the team. Davey returned from injury and started the next six games, compiling a 4–2 record. During that stretch, he led San Antonio to three consecutive road victories over the Chicago Rush, New Orleans VooDoo, and the Iowa Barnstormers. Against Chicago, Davey completed 24 of 42 passes for 344 yards with six touchdowns and two interceptions in a 61–54 victory. Following a Week 18 loss to Spokane in which Davey threw five interceptions, the Talons signed quarterbacks Robert Kent and Marcus Jackson. Kent started the regular-season finale, while Jackson also saw action in an upset victory against the Philadelphia Soul that secured San Antonio's 10th win of the season. Despite using six different starting quarterbacks, eight quarterbacks in game action, and signing nine quarterbacks during the season, the Talons finished 10–8. The team's starting quarterbacks posted the following records: John Dutton (0–2), Nick Hill (4–2), Zach Frazer (0–1), Xavier Lee (1–1), Rohan Davey (4–2), and Robert Kent (1–0).

== Final roster ==
2013 San Antonio Talons roster
Quarterbacks: 14 Marcus Jackson; 19 Robert Kent; Fullbacks: 28 Chad Cook; 4 Micah King; Wide receivers: 18 Dallas Baker; -- Marcus Barnett; 21 Brent Holmes; 7 D. J. Stephens; 15 Jomo Wilson	Offensive linemen: 64 Ray Hisatake; 78 Solomon Orr; 96 Moqut Ruffins; Defensive linemen: 8 Tim McGill; 11 Joe Sykes; 33 Mark Weivoda	Linebackers: 44 Jamar Ransom; -- Brandon Sesay; 3 Pierre Turner; Defensive backs: 2 Carlton Brown; 5 Andre Jones; 27 Justin Hannah; 1 Kelvin Rodgers; 6 Fred Shaw; Kickers: 13 Stefan Demos	Injured reserve: 77 Emmanuel Akah OL; 14 Rohan Davey QB; 42 Victor DeGrate LB; 17 John Dutton QB; 1 Dwayne Eley Jr. WR; 9 Zach Frazer QB; 17 Nick Hill QB; 82 Robert Quiroga WR; 62 Eddie Williams OL; Refuse to report: -- Markus McFolling FB; League suspension: -- Nate Davis QB; -- Robert Gill WR; 72 Isaac Leatiota OL; 19 Xavier Lee QB/WR; 81 Burl Toler III WR; Other league exempt: 2 Eric Crocker DB; -- G. J. Kinne QB; Inactive reserve: Currently vacant; Recallable reassignment: Currently vacant; Rookies in italics Roster updated July 25, 2013; 24 Active, 17 Inactive

== Standings ==
Central Division
Team	W	L	PCT	PF	PA	DIV	CON	Home	Away
y-Chicago Rush	10	8	.556	973	947	2–2	5–5	3–5	7–3
San Antonio Talons	10	8	.556	782	884	2–2	3–8	4–5	6–3
Iowa Barnstormers	6	12	.333	827	913	2–2	3–7	2–7	4–5

y - Clinched division

== Regular season schedule ==
The Talons began the season at home against the San Jose SaberCats on March 23. They closed the regular season at home against the Philadelphia Soul on July 27.

Week	Day	Date	Kickoff	Opponent	Results		Location	Report
Week	Day	Date	Kickoff	Opponent	Score	Record	Location	Report
1	Saturday	March 23	7:30 p.m. CDT	San Jose SaberCats	L 42–47	0–1	Alamodome	
2	Bye							
3	Friday	April 5	7:30 p.m. CDT	Chicago Rush	L 41–48	0–2	Alamodome	
4	Friday	April 12	7:00 p.m. CDT	at Tampa Bay Storm	W 52–36	1–2	Tampa Bay Times Forum	
5	Saturday	April 20	8:00 p.m. CDT	at Arizona Rattlers	L 40–83	1–3	US Airways Center	
6	Sunday	April 28	1:00 p.m. CDT	at Pittsburgh Power	W 42–37	2–3	Consol Energy Center	
7	Friday	May 3	7:30 p.m. CDT	Iowa Barnstormers	L 36–48	2–4	Alamodome	
8	Saturday	May 11	8:30 p.m. CDT	Jacksonville Sharks	W 34–30	3–4	Alamodome	
9	Saturday	May 18	6:00 p.m. CDT	at Cleveland Gladiators	W 57–33	4–4	Quicken Loans Arena	
10	Friday	May 24	7:30 p.m. CDT	Spokane Shock	L 48–61	4–5	Alamodome	
11	Monday	June 3	7:30 p.m. CDT	Utah Blaze	W 42–41	5–5	Alamodome	
12	Saturday	June 8	7:30 p.m. CDT	Arizona Rattlers	L 21–70	5–6	Alamodome	
13	Saturday	June 15	7:00 p.m. CDT	at Chicago Rush	W 61–54	6–6	BMO Harris Bank Center	
14	Saturday	June 22	7:00 p.m. CDT	at New Orleans VooDoo	W 56–53	7–6	New Orleans Arena	
15	Saturday	June 29	7:05 p.m. CDT	at Iowa Barnstormers	W 35–34	8–6	Wells Fargo Arena	
16	Saturday	July 6	9:30 p.m. CDT	at San Jose SaberCats	L 35–62	8–7	HP Pavilion at San Jose	
17	Saturday	July 13	7:30 p.m. CDT	Tampa Bay Storm	W 68–42	9–7	Alamodome	
18	Friday	July 19	9:00 p.m. CDT	at Spokane Shock	L 30–77	9–8	Spokane Veterans Memorial Arena	
19	Saturday	July 27	8:00 p.m. CDT	Philadelphia Soul	W 42–28	10–8	Alamodome	
