= 2013 San Jose SaberCats season =

Arena Football League team season

- Head coach: Darren Arbet
- Home stadium: SAP Center at San Jose (renamed from HP Pavilion at San Jose on June 18, 2013)

Results
- Record: 13–5
- Division place: 3rd NC West
- Playoffs: Lost Conference semifinals (Rattlers) 49–59
- Team DPY: Clevan Thomas

The 2013 San Jose SaberCats season was the 17th season for the franchise Arena Football League (AFL). The team was coached by Darren Arbet and played their home games at the SAP Center at San Jose. The SaberCats qualified for the playoffs with a 13–5 record, but were eliminated by the top seeded Arizona Rattlers in the conference semifinals by a 59–49 score.

== Final roster ==
2013 San Jose SaberCats roster
Quarterbacks: 12 Russ Michna; 10 Mitch Mustain; Fullbacks: Currently vacant; Wide receivers: 11 Amarri Jackson; 9 James Roe; 17 Huey Whittaker; 15 Fred Williams; 7 Jason Willis	Offensive linemen: 68 George Bussey; 69 Dennis Godfrey; 50 Raymond McNeil; 70 Jordan Mudge; 64 Rich Ranglin; 73 T. J. Watkins; Defensive linemen: 23 Terrance Carter; 54 Jabari Fletcher; 45 Duke Pettijohn; 99 Jason Stewart; 36 Luis Vasquez	Linebackers: 98 Francis Maka; Defensive backs: 13 Mervin Brookins; 5 Ken Fontenette; 6 J. C. Neal; 8 Clevan Thomas; Kickers: 4 Nich Pertuit	Injured reserve: 42 Kris Cavitt FB; 1 Rashied Davis WR; 30 Justin Edison DL; 3 Andre Freeman DB; 56 Ollie Ogbu DL; 19 Armand Robinson WR; 21 Jamarko Simmons WR; 24 Tommy Taggart FB; 20 Justin Warren DL; League suspension: 42 Sifa Etu FB; 79 Ako Poti OL; 45 Malcolm Sheppard DL; Recallable reassignment: Currently vacant; Refuse to report: -- Delvin Johnson DL; -- Nick Torresso FB; Other league exempt: 47 Brian Folkerts OL; -- Wayne Tribue OL; Inactive Reserve: 44 Wesley Mauia LB; 53 Steve Octavien LB; Rookies in italics Roster updated August 2, 2013; 24 Active, 18 Inactive

== Standings ==
West Division
Team	W	L	PCT	PF	PA	DIV	CON	Home	Away
z-Arizona Rattlers	15	3	.833	1203	866	4–2	9–3	8–1	7–2
x-Spokane Shock	14	4	.778	1198	896	4–2	8–2	7–2	7–2
x-San Jose SaberCats	13	5	.722	1033	877	3–3	6–4	8–2	5–3
Utah Blaze	7	11	.389	896	988	1–5	3–8	4–5	3–6

z - Clinched division and conference's best record
x - Clinched playoff berth

== Schedule ==
=== Regular season ===
The SaberCats began the season by visiting the San Antonio Talons on March 23. Their first home game was against the Orlando Predators on March 29. They closed the regular season at home against the Chicago Rush on July 27.

Week	Day	Date	Kickoff	Opponent	Results		Location	Report
Week	Day	Date	Kickoff	Opponent	Score	Record	Location	Report
1	Saturday	March 23	5:30 p.m. PDT	at San Antonio Talons	W 47–42	1–0	Alamodome	
2	Friday	March 29	7:30 p.m. PDT	Orlando Predators	W 65–62	2–0	HP Pavilion at San Jose	
3	Saturday	April 6	5:30 p.m. PDT	at Arizona Rattlers	L 47–73	2–1	US Airways Center	
4	Bye							
5	Friday	April 19	7:30 p.m. PDT	Spokane Shock	L 47–69	2–2	HP Pavilion at San Jose	
6	Saturday	April 27	5:00 p.m. PDT	at New Orleans VooDoo	W 57–38	3–2	New Orleans Arena	
7	Saturday	May 4	7:30 p.m. PDT	Cleveland Gladiators	W 56–36	4–2	HP Pavilion at San Jose	
8	Friday	May 10	7:30 p.m. PDT	Tampa Bay Storm	W 64–34	5–2	HP Pavilion at San Jose	
9	Saturday	May 18	4:20 p.m. PDT	at Jacksonville Sharks	W 57–36	6–2	Jacksonville Veterans Memorial Arena	
10	Saturday	May 25	7:30 p.m. PDT	Utah Blaze	W 35–34	7–2	HP Pavilion at San Jose	
11	Saturday	June 1	7:00 p.m. PDT	at Spokane Shock	L 45–75	7–3	Spokane Veterans Memorial Arena	
12	Saturday	June 8	7:30 p.m. PDT	Pittsburgh Power	W 68–54	8–3	HP Pavilion at San Jose	
13	Saturday	June 15	5:05 p.m. PDT	at Iowa Barnstormers	L 73–68	8–4	Wells Fargo Arena	
14	Saturday	June 22	7:30 p.m. PDT	Arizona Rattlers	W 72–42	9–4	SAP Center at San Jose	
15	Saturday	June 29	6:00 p.m. PDT	at Utah Blaze	W 57–49	10–4	EnergySolutions Arena	
16	Saturday	July 6	7:30 p.m. PDT	San Antonio Talons	W 62–35	11–4	SAP Center at San Jose	
17	Saturday	July 13	4:00 p.m. PDT	at Pittsburgh Power	W 78–20	12–4	Consol Energy Center	
18	Saturday	July 20	7:30 p.m. PDT	Philadelphia Soul	L 43–65	12–5	SAP Center at San Jose	
19	Saturday	July 27	7:30 p.m. PDT	Chicago Rush	W 65–40	13–5	SAP Center at San Jose	

=== Playoffs ===
Round	Day	Date	Kickoff	Opponent	Results	Location	Report
NC Semifinals	Sunday	August 4	5:00 p.m. PDT	at Arizona Rattlers	L 49–59	US Airways Center	
