= 2013 Spokane Shock season =

Arena Football League team season

- Head coach: Andy Olson
- Home stadium: Spokane Veterans Memorial Arena

Results
- Record: 14–4
- Division place: 2nd NC West
- Playoffs: Won Conference semifinals (Rush 69–47; Lost Conference Championship (Rattlers) 57–65
- Team MVP: Erik Meyer
- Team OPY: Erik Meyer

The 2013 Spokane Shock season was the eighth season for the franchise, and the fourth in the Arena Football League. The team was coached by Andy Olson and played their home games at Spokane Veterans Memorial Arena. With a 14–4 record in the regular season, the Shock qualified for the playoffs. However, they were defeated by the Arizona Rattlers in the conference championship game by a 65–57 score.

== Final roster ==
2013 Spokane Shock roster
Quarterbacks: 9 Erik Meyer; 10 Arvell Nelson; Fullbacks: Currently vacant; Wide receivers: 4 Duane Brooks; 12 Kamar Jorden; 7 Jeffrey Soloman; 17 Adron Tennell; 6 Brandon Thompkins	Offensive linemen: 68 Ryan Cave; 52 Will Falakiseni; 70 Tyrone Novikoff; 79 Ben Ossai; 55 Chris Pino; 70 Myniya Smith; Defensive linemen: 11 Diryal Biggs; 4 Jeremy Geathers; 92 Jake Killeen; 44 James Ruffin; 67 Terrance Taylor	Linebackers: 2 Beau Bell; 8 Terence Moore; Defensive backs: 3 Ruschard Dodd-Masters; 5 Terrance Sanders; 1 Paul Stephens; 23 Patrick Stoudamire; Kickers: 13 Taylor Rowan	Refuse to report: 73 Andrew Roxas OL; Other League Exempt: 32 Antareis Bryan DB; 18 Nicholas Edwards WR; 70 Levi Horn OL; 72 Jonathan Williams DL; Injured reserve: 70 Patrick Afif OL/TE; 65 B. J. Cabbell OL; 77 Palauni Ma Sun OL; 94 Marc Schiechl LB; 51 Sam Tupua OL; League suspension: 18 Demario Ballard WR; -- Kourtnei Brown DL; -- Chris Tucker DL; Inactive reserve: Currently vacant; Recallable reassignment: Currently vacant; Rookies in italics Roster updated August 8, 2013; 25 Active, 13 Inactive

== Standings ==
West Division
Team	W	L	PCT	PF	PA	DIV	CON	Home	Away
z-Arizona Rattlers	15	3	.833	1203	866	4–2	9–3	8–1	7–2
x-Spokane Shock	14	4	.778	1198	896	4–2	8–2	7–2	7–2
x-San Jose SaberCats	13	5	.722	1033	877	3–3	6–4	8–2	5–3
Utah Blaze	7	11	.389	896	988	1–5	3–8	4–5	3–6

z - Clinched division and conference's best record
x - Clinched playoff berth

== Schedule ==
=== Regular season ===
The Shock began the season by visiting the Cleveland Gladiators on March 24. Their first home game was against the Arizona Rattlers on April 12. They will close the regular season at home against the Pittsburgh Power on July 26.

Week	Day	Date	Kickoff	Opponent	Results		Location	Report
Week	Day	Date	Kickoff	Opponent	Score	Record	Location	Report
1	Sunday	March 24	10:00 a.m. PDT	at Cleveland Gladiators	W 67–41	1–0	Quicken Loans Arena	
2	Sunday	March 31	1:00 p.m. PDT	at Chicago Rush	W 76–61	2–0	Allstate Arena	
3	Friday	April 5	5:05 p.m. PDT	at Iowa Barnstormers	W 66–43	3–0	Wells Fargo Arena	
4	Friday	April 12	7:00 p.m. PDT	Arizona Rattlers	W 66–49	4–0	Spokane Veterans Memorial Arena	
5	Friday	April 19	7:30 p.m. PDT	at San Jose SaberCats	W 69–47	5–0	HP Pavilion at San Jose	
6	Saturday	April 27	7:00 p.m. PDT	Tampa Bay Storm	L 62–70	5–1	Spokane Veterans Memorial Arena	
7	Saturday	May 4	6:00 p.m. PDT	at Utah Blaze	L 48–52	5–2	EnergySolutions Arena	
8	Saturday	May 11	7:00 p.m. PDT	Orlando Predators	L 82–83	5–3	Spokane Veterans Memorial Arena	
9	Friday	May 17	7:00 p.m. PDT	New Orleans VooDoo	W 66–54	6–3	Spokane Veterans Memorial Arena	
10	Friday	May 24	5:30 p.m. PDT	at San Antonio Talons	W 61–48	7–3	Alamodome	
11	Saturday	June 1	7:00 p.m. PDT	San Jose SaberCats	W 75–45	8–3	Spokane Veterans Memorial Arena	
12	Saturday	June 8	7:00 p.m. PDT	Jacksonville Sharks	W 76–41	9–3	Spokane Veterans Memorial Arena	
13	Saturday	June 15	6:00 p.m. PDT	at Arizona Rattlers	L 42–59	9–4	US Airways Center	
14	Friday	June 21	7:00 p.m. PDT	Utah Blaze	W 80–41	10–4	Spokane Veterans Memorial Arena	
15	Bye							
16	Saturday	July 6	4:30 p.m. PDT	at Tampa Bay Storm	W 63–49	11–4	Tampa Bay Times Forum	
17	Saturday	July 13	4:00 p.m. PDT	at Jacksonville Sharks	W 62–40	12–4	Jacksonville Veterans Memorial Arena	
18	Friday	July 19	7:00 p.m. PDT	San Antonio Talons	W 77–30	13–4	Spokane Veterans Memorial Arena	
19	Friday	July 26	7:00 p.m. PDT	Pittsburgh Power	W 61–43	14–4	Spokane Veterans Memorial Arena	

=== Playoffs ===
Round	Day	Date	Kickoff	Opponent	Results	Location	Report
NC Semifinals	Thursday	August 1	7:00 p.m. PDT	Chicago Rush	W 69–47	Spokane Veterans Memorial Arena	
NC Championship	Thursday	August 10	6:00 p.m. PDT	at Arizona Rattlers	L 57–65	US Airways Center	
