= Odrick Ray =

American football player (born 1989)

No. 32
- Position: Defensive end / Defensive tackle

Personal information
- Born: May 24, 1989 (age 37); Athens, Texas
- Listed height: 6 ft 4 in (1.93 m)
- Listed weight: 275 lb (125 kg)

Career information
- College: Tulsa
- NFL draft: 2011: undrafted

Career history
- Jacksonville Jaguars (2011); Iowa Barnstormers (2013)

Career AFL statistics
- Tackles: 13
- Sacks: 2.0
- Pass breakups: 1
- Stats at ArenaFan.com
- Stats at Pro Football Reference

Odrick Ray (born May 24, 1989) is an American former football defensive end and defensive tackle. He was signed by the Jaguars as an undrafted free agent in 2011. He played college football at Tulsa.

== Professional career ==
=== Jacksonville Jaguars ===
Ray signed with the Jacksonville Jaguars following the 2011 NFL draft as a rookie free agent. Ray was cut on September 3, 2011, during final cuts.

On May 7, 2012, Ray was re-signed after a workout with the Jaguars. On August 31, he was waived/injured. He was released from injured reserve on October 15.
