= Christian Johnson =

American football player (born 1986)

No. 78
- Position: Offensive lineman

Personal information
- Born: October 17, 1986 (age 40); Alexandria, Virginia, U.S.
- Listed height: 6 ft 4 in (1.93 m)
- Listed weight: 320 lb (145 kg)

Career information
- High school: West Potomac (Alexandria)
- College: Kentucky

Career history
- Dallas Vigilantes (2011); Philadelphia Soul (2011–2014); Arizona Cardinals (2014)*
- * Offseason or practice squad member only

Awards and highlights
- First-team All-Arena (2013)
- Stats at Pro Football Reference
- Stats at ArenaFan.com

Christian Johnson (born October 17, 1986) is an American former professional football offensive lineman who played in the Arena Football League (AFL) for the Dallas Vigilantes and Philadelphia Soul. He played college football at the University of Kentucky. He was a member of the Arizona Cardinals.

== Early life ==
Johnson attended West Potomac High School in Alexandria, Virginia.

== Professional career ==
Pre-draft measurables
Height	Weight	40-yard dash	10-yard split	20-yard split	20-yard shuttle	Three-cone drill	Vertical jump	Broad jump	Bench press
6 ft 3 1/4 in (1.91 m)	330 lb (150 kg)	5.31 s	1.84 s	3.07 s	4.85 s	8.37 s	26.0 in (0.66 m)	7 ft 4 in (2.24 m)	34 reps
All values from Pro Day

Johnson played for the Dallas Vigilantes of the Arena Football League (AFL) during the 2011 season.

Johnson was assigned to the Philadelphia Soul of the AFL on October 25, 2011. The Soul advanced to ArenaBowl XXV in 2012 and ArenaBowl XXVI in 2013, losing to the Arizona Rattlers both times. Johnson was named first-team All-Arena in 2013.

Johnson was signed by the Arizona Cardinals of the National Football League on January 7, 2014 and placed on the Soul's Other League Exempt list. He was released by the Cardinals on June 9, 2014.

Johnson returned to the Soul on June 19, 2014.
