= 2013 Orlando Predators season =

Arena Football League team season

- Head coach: Doug Plank
- Home stadium: Amway Center

Results
- Record: 7–11
- Division place: 2nd AC South
- Playoffs: Lost Conference semifinals (Soul) 55–59

The 2013 Orlando Predators season was the 22nd season for the franchise in the Arena Football League. The team was coached by Doug Plank and played their home games at Amway Center. Despite losing their first five games, the Predators recovered enough to qualify for the playoffs. However, they were eliminated by the Philadelphia Soul by a score of 59–55 in the conference semifinals.

== Final roster ==
2013 Orlando Predators roster
Quarterbacks: 14 Collin Drafts; 8 Aaron Garcia; Fullbacks: 24 Mykel Benson; Wide receivers: 15 Prechae Rodriguez; 17 T. T. Toliver; 1 Jarvis Williams; 11 Maurice Williams	Offensive linemen: -- Bryon Bishop; 63 Terrence Campbell; 65 Chris Jamison; -- Michael Simons; 69 Matt Spanos; Defensive linemen: 99 Larry Ford; 23 Justin Parrish; 94 Prentice Purnell; 44 Mark Robinson; 98 Henry Taylor	Linebackers: -- Markell Carter; 41 Dexter Jackson; 10 Charlie Hunt; Defensive backs: 4 Dezeriah Johnson; 22 Dominic Jones; 6 Anthony Shutt; 5 Cortez Stubbs; 20 Tanner Varner; Kickers: 18 Mark Lewis	Refuse to Report: -- Michael Landry DL; 94 T. J. Langley DL; Injured reserve: 99 Drew Berube DL; 20 Josh Bush DB; 92 Tommy Chavis DL; 49 Tim Cheatwood LB; 2 Travis Coleman DB; 5 Marcus Everett LB; 6 Steven Gachette QB; 3 Jason Geathers WR; 9 Marlon Moye-Moore FB; 99 Quinn Pitcock DL; 27 Roy Polite DB; -- Wondell Rutledge FB; 98 Jermaine Smith DL; 55 Julius Wilson OL; Other league exempt list: 92 Xavier Proctor DL; League suspension: 55 Willie Pritchett OL; -- Claude Wroten DL; Inactive reserve: 21 Simeon Castille DB; 77 Devin Clark OL; Recallable reassignment: Currently Vacant; Rookies in italics Roster updated August 1, 2013; 26 Active, 21 Inactive

== Standings ==
South Division
Team	W	L	PCT	PF	PA	DIV	CON	Home	Away
z-Jacksonville Sharks	12	6	.667	941	883	6–0	11–0	6–3	6–3
x-Orlando Predators	7	11	.389	965	1032	2–4	5–7	4–5	3–6
x-Tampa Bay Storm	7	11	.389	959	980	2–4	4–6	2–7	5–4
New Orleans VooDoo	5	13	.278	833	1069	2–4	4–6	3–6	2–7

z - Clinched division and conference's best record
x - Clinched playoff berth

== Schedule ==
=== Regular season ===
The Predators began the season on the road against the New Orleans VooDoo on March 24. Their first home game was on April 6 against the Philadelphia Soul. They closed the regular season against the VooDoo at home on July 27.

Week	Day	Date	Kickoff	Opponent	Results		Location	Report
Week	Day	Date	Kickoff	Opponent	Score	Record	Location	Report
1	Sunday	March 24	4:00 p.m. EDT	at New Orleans VooDoo	L 45–51 (OT)	0–1	New Orleans Arena	
2	Friday	March 29	10:30 p.m. EDT	at San Jose SaberCats	L 62–65	0–2	HP Pavilion at San Jose	
3	Saturday	April 6	7:00 p.m. EDT	Philadelphia Soul	L 33–61	0–3	Amway Center	
4	Bye							
5	Saturday	April 20	7:00 p.m. EDT	Tampa Bay Storm	L 35–53	0–4	Amway Center	
6	Sunday	April 28	6:00 p.m. EDT	at Arizona Rattlers	L 42–82	0–5	US Airways Center	
7	Saturday	May 4	7:00 p.m. EDT	at Pittsburgh Power	W 52–38	1–5	Consol Energy Center	
8	Saturday	May 11	10:00 p.m. EDT	at Spokane Shock	W 83–82	2–5	Spokane Veterans Memorial Arena	
9	Saturday	May 18	7:00 p.m. EDT	at Philadelphia Soul	L 51–61	2–6	Wells Fargo Center	
10	Saturday	May 25	7:00 p.m. EDT	Jacksonville Sharks	L 41–44	2–7	Amway Center	
11	Saturday	June 1	7:00 p.m. EDT	Chicago Rush	L 55–63	2–8	Amway Center	
12	Saturday	June 8	7:30 p.m. EDT	at Tampa Bay Storm	W 55–48	3–8	Tampa Bay Times Forum	
13	Saturday	June 15	7:00 p.m. EDT	Cleveland Gladiators	W 62–55	4–8	Amway Center	
14	Saturday	June 22	7:00 p.m. EDT	Pittsburgh Power	W 50–35	5–8	Amway Center	
15	Saturday	June 29	7:00 p.m. EDT	at Jacksonville Sharks	L 55–62	5–9	Jacksonville Veterans Memorial Arena	
16	Saturday	July 6	7:00 p.m. EDT	Arizona Rattlers	L 56–84	5–10	Amway Center	
17	Saturday	July 13	7:00 p.m. EDT	Iowa Barnstormers	W 55–41	6–10	Amway Center	
18	Saturday	July 20	7:00 p.m. EDT	at Cleveland Gladiators	L 62–65	6–11	Quicken Loans Arena	
19	Saturday	July 27	7:00 p.m. EDT	New Orleans VooDoo	W 71–42	7–11	Amway Center	

=== Playoffs ===
Round	Day	Date	Kickoff	Opponent	Results	Location	Report
AC Semifinals	Saturday	August 3	7:05 p.m. EDT	at Philadelphia Soul	L 55–59	Wells Fargo Center	
