= Jean Fanor =

American gridiron football player (born 1989)

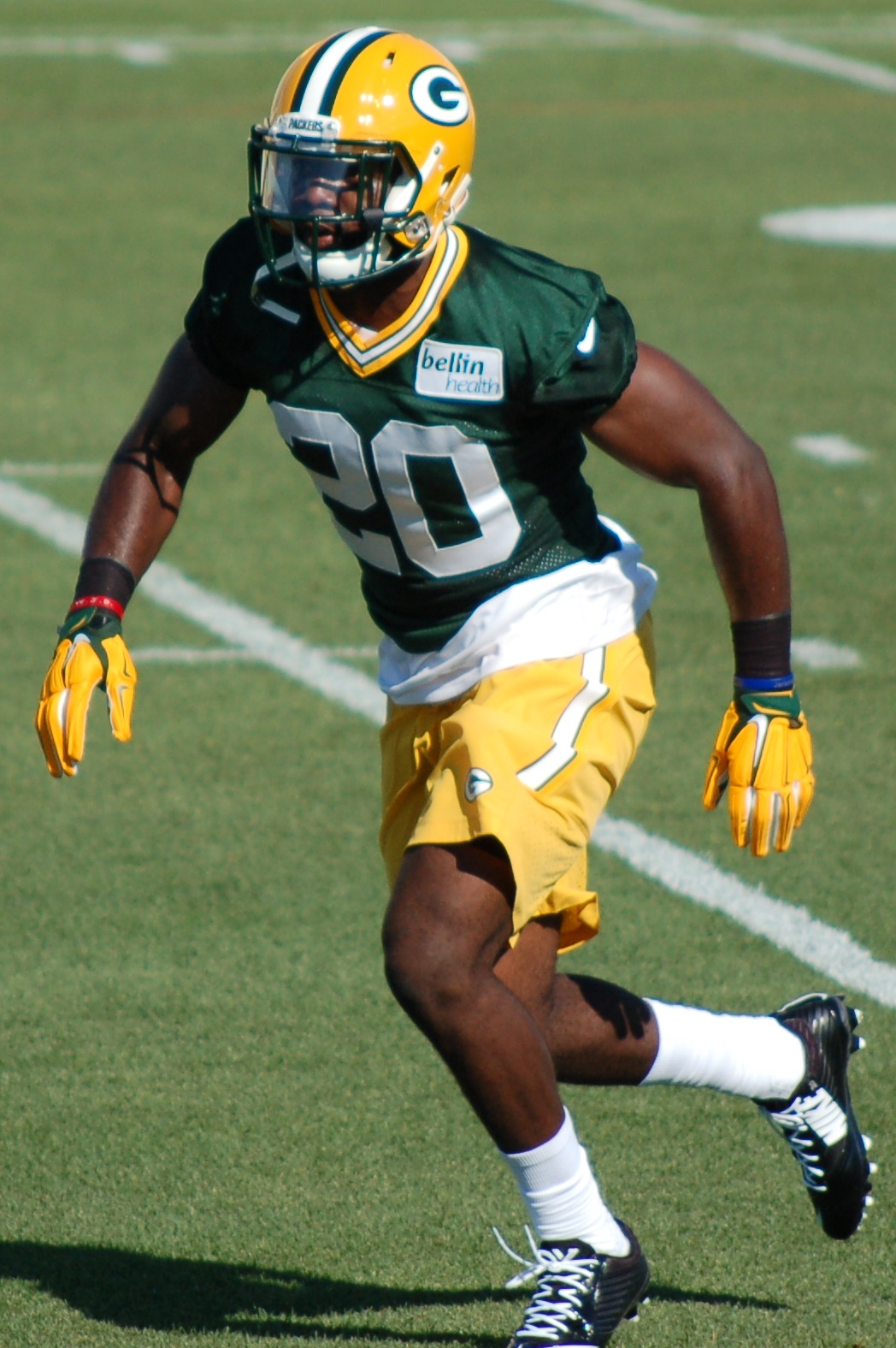
- Fanor with the Green Bay Packers in 2015

Profile
- Position: Safety

Personal information
- Born: June 17, 1989 (age 37); Haiti
- Listed height: 6 ft 0 in (1.83 m)
- Listed weight: 205 lb (93 kg)

Career information
- High school: North Miami (FL)
- College: Bethune-Cookman
- NFL draft: 2012: undrafted

Career history
- Kansas City Chiefs (2012)*; Tampa Bay Storm (2013–2014); Green Bay Packers (2014)*; Toronto Argonauts (2016)*
- * Offseason or practice squad member only

Career AFL statistics
- Tackles: 195
- Sacks: 0
- Pass deflections: 15
- Interceptions: 7
- Forced fumbles: 4
- Touchdowns: 2
- Stats at Pro Football Reference
- Stats at ArenaFan.com

Jean Fanor (born June 17, 1989) is a former American football safety. He played college football at Bethune-Cookman. Fanor was signed by the Kansas City Chiefs as an undrafted free agent in 2012. He was also a member of the Tampa Bay Storm, Green Bay Packers and Toronto Argonauts.

== Early life ==
Jean Fanor is of Haitian descent. Fanor played high school football for the North Miami High School Pioneers.

== College career ==
Fanor continued his football career for the Bethune-Cookman Wildcats from 2007 to 2011. Fanor played running back, wide receiver and defensive back as a freshman and sophomore before being made strictly a safety his final 3 season. He missed his senior season due to injury, where he redshirted, and played his final season as a redshirt-senior. As a senior, he was second on the team in tackles with 73, also had 3 interceptions, and 2 forced fumbles that earned him second-team all conference honors.

== Professional career ==
=== Kansas City Chiefs ===
Fanor was signed by the Kansas City Chiefs after going undrafted in the 2012 NFL draft. Fanor played 3 preseason games with the Chiefs before he was waived.

=== Tampa Bay Storm ===
Fanor was assigned to the Tampa Bay Storm in November 8, 2012. Fanor had a solid rookie season, posting 6 interceptions for the Storm. In 2014, Fanor recorded 111 tackles.

=== Green Bay Packers ===
Fanor was signed to the Green Bay Packers' practice squad on December 17, 2014. On September 5, 2015, he was released by the Packers during final team cuts.

=== Toronto Argonauts ===
Fanor was signed by Toronto Argonauts on March 3, 2016. He was released by the Argonauts on May 4, 2016.
