= Garrett Lindholm =

American football player (born 1988)

No. 5, 7
- Position: Placekicker

Personal information
- Born: August 10, 1988 (age 38); Pflugerville, Texas, U.S.
- Listed height: 5 ft 9 in (1.75 m)
- Listed weight: 185 lb (84 kg)

Career information
- High school: Pflugerville (Texas)
- College: Tarleton State
- NFL draft: 2010: undrafted

Career history
- Atlanta Falcons (2010)*; Indianapolis Colts (2010)*; Milwaukee Mustangs (2011); St. Louis Rams (2012)*; Arizona Rattlers (2013); San Antonio Talons (2014); New Orleans VooDoo (2015); Orlando Predators (2015); Los Angeles KISS (2016)
- * Offseason or practice squad member only

Awards and highlights
- ArenaBowl champion (2013); First-team All-Arena (2013); AFL Kicker of the Year (2013)

Career AFL statistics
- Field goals made: 43
- Field goals attempted: 71
- Field goal %: 60.6%
- Stats at ArenaFan.com

Garrett Lindholm (born August 10, 1988) is an American former professional football placekicker who played in the Arena Football League (AFL). He played college football for the Tarleton State Texans.

== Early life ==
Lindholm played for Tarleton State in college. He made a 64-yard field goal to send Tarleton to overtime against Texas A&M–Kingsville in his senior season.

== Professional career ==
=== Early career ===
Lindholm signed with the Atlanta Falcons in 2010, but was released in July. Lindholm was claimed off waivers by the Indianapolis Colts, where he played in 3 preseason games mostly as a kickoff specialist. He was released prior to the Colts' third preseason game.

=== Milwaukee Mustangs ===
In 2011, Lindholm was assigned to the Milwaukee Mustangs of the Arena Football League (AFL).

=== St. Louis Rams ===
Lindholm played the 2012 preseason with the St. Louis Rams. Lindholm received an opportunity to kick for the Rams, but was competing with Greg Zuerlein who was drafted, and eventually won the job. Lindholm was released following the Rams' 3rd preseason game.

=== Arizona Rattlers ===
In 2013, Lindholm was assigned to the Arizona Rattlers. Lindholm lead the AFL in field goals made (7), and was the league leader in points (179). Lindholm was named the AFL's Kicker of the Year following the conclusion of the regular season. His longest made field goal was from 47 yards. His efforts helped the Rattlers capture their second consecutive ArenaBowl Championship.

=== San Antonio Talons ===
On January 30, 2014, Lindholm was assigned to the San Antonio Talons.

=== New Orleans VooDoo ===
On March 26, 2015, Lindholm was assigned to the New Orleans VooDoo. When the VooDoo ceased operations August 9, 2015, Lindholm became a free agent.

=== Orlando Predators ===
On August 12, 2015, Lindholm was assigned to the Orlando Predators.

=== Los Angeles KISS ===
On August 6, 2016, Lindholm was assigned to the Los Angeles KISS.
