= 2013 New Orleans VooDoo season =

Sports season

- Head coach: Pat O'Hara
- Home stadium: New Orleans Arena; Mercedes-Benz Superdome

Results
- Record: 5–13
- Division place: 4th AC South
- Playoffs: Did not qualify

The 2013 New Orleans VooDoo season was the seventh season for the franchise in the Arena Football League. The team was coached by Pat O'Hara and played their first three home games at the New Orleans Arena. Due to the renovations to the arena that started immediately following the conclusion of the New Orleans Hornets season, the Voodoo played their remaining six home games at the Mercedes-Benz Superdome. The VooDoo had a chance to clinch a playoff berth in their final game, but lost to finish the season with a 5–13 record.

== Roster ==
2013 New Orleans VooDoo roster
Quarterbacks: 3 Chris Dixon; 14 Kurt Rocco; 13 Bill Stull; Fullbacks: 88 Jeramie Richardson; 40 Bryce Tennison; Wide receivers: 7 Larry Beavers; 28 L. J. Castile; 2 Donovan Morgan; 15 Quorey Payne; 12 Antonio Robinson; 6 Courtney Smith	Offensive linemen: 77 Nyere Aumaitre; 55 Lorenzo Breland; 5 Bruce Figgins; Defensive linemen: 96 Xavier Brown; 99 Marlon Favorite; 9 Michael Janac	Linebackers: 4 James Bryant; Defensive backs: 11 Chris Brown; 17 Cameron McGlenn; 24 Dwight McLean; 21 Eddie Moten; 1 Demarcus Robinson; Kickers: 22 Kenny Spencer	Injury reserve: 17 Chris Duvalt WR; 5 Derandus Frye DL; -- Daniel Griggs DB; 25 Derek Lee WR; 8 Leslie Majors DB; Other league exempt: 24 Delvin Breaux DB; 71 Thaddeus Coleman OL; -- Shay Hodge WR; -- Daniel Hrapmann K; League suspension: 11 Derrick Boyd DB; 20 Ramon Broadway DB; 75 Ernest McCoy OL; 70 Zhamal Thomas OL; 88 Akia Williams WR; Refused to report: -- Samora Goodson WR; Inactive reserve: Currently vacant; Recallable reassignment: Currently vacant; Rookies in italics Roster updated July 4, 2013; 23 Active, 17 Inactive

== Standings ==
South Division
Team	W	L	PCT	PF	PA	DIV	CON	Home	Away
z-Jacksonville Sharks	12	6	.667	941	883	6–0	11–0	6–3	6–3
x-Orlando Predators	7	11	.389	965	1032	2–4	5–7	4–5	3–6
x-Tampa Bay Storm	7	11	.389	959	980	2–4	4–6	2–7	5–4
New Orleans VooDoo	5	13	.278	833	1069	2–4	4–6	3–6	2–7

z - Clinched division and conference's best record
x - Clinched playoff berth

== Regular season schedule ==
The VooDoo began the season by hosting the Orlando Predators on March 24. They closed the regular season against the Predators in Orlando on July 27.

Week	Day	Date	Kickoff	Opponent	Results		Location	Report
Week	Day	Date	Kickoff	Opponent	Score	Record	Location	Report
1	Sunday	March 24	3:00 p.m. CDT	Orlando Predators	W 51–45 (OT)	1–0	New Orleans Arena	
2	Saturday	March 30	6:00 p.m. CDT	Iowa Barnstormers	L 34–48	1–1	New Orleans Arena	
3	Bye							
4	Friday	April 12	7:00 p.m. CDT	at Jacksonville Sharks	L 30–76	1–2	Jacksonville Veterans Memorial Arena	
5	Friday	April 19	7:30 p.m. CDT	Pittsburgh Power	L 43–46	1–3	New Orleans Arena	
6	Saturday	April 27	7:00 p.m. CDT	San Jose SaberCats	L 38–57	1–4	Mercedes-Benz Superdome	
7	Saturday	May 4	8:00 p.m. CDT	at Tampa Bay Storm	L 32–63	1–5	Tampa Bay Times Forum	
8	Saturday	May 11	7:05 p.m. CDT	at Iowa Barnstormers	L 16–62	1–6	Wells Fargo Arena	
9	Friday	May 17	9:00 p.m. CDT	at Spokane Shock	L 54–65	1–7	Spokane Veterans Memorial Arena	
10	Saturday	May 25	8:00 p.m. CDT	Chicago Rush	L 48–84	1–8	Mercedes-Benz Superdome	
11	Saturday	June 1	7:00 p.m. CDT	Cleveland Gladiators	W 69–40	2–8	Mercedes-Benz Superdome	
12	Saturday	June 8	6:05 p.m. CDT	at Philadelphia Soul	L 56–65	2–9	Wells Fargo Center	
13	Saturday	June 15	7:00 p.m. CDT	Tampa Bay Storm	W 54–51	3–9	Mercedes-Benz Superdome	
14	Saturday	June 22	7:00 p.m. CDT	San Antonio Talons	L 53–56	3–10	Mercedes-Benz Superdome	
15	Saturday	June 29	6:00 p.m. CDT	at Pittsburgh Power	W 59–54	4–10	Consol Energy Center	
16	Saturday	July 6	8:00 p.m. CDT	at Utah Blaze	W 63–49	5–10	EnergySolutions Arena	
17	Saturday	July 13	8:00 p.m. CDT	at Arizona Rattlers	L 42–79	5–11	US Airways Center	
18	Saturday	July 20	7:00 p.m. CDT	Jacksonville Sharks	L 49–58	5–12	Mercedes-Benz Superdome	
19	Saturday	July 27	6:00 p.m. CDT	at Orlando Predators	L 42–71	5–13	Amway Center	
