= 2013 Chicago Rush season =

Arena Football League team season

- Owner: David Staral Jr. (until May 7th); Arena Football League (interim)
- Head coach: Bob McMillen
- Home stadium: Allstate Arena & BMO Harris Bank Center

Results
- Record: 10–8
- Division place: 1st NC Central
- Playoffs: Lost Conference semifinals (Shock) 47–69

The 2013 Chicago Rush season was the 12th season for the franchise in the Arena Football League. The team was coached by Bob McMillen and played their last few home games at BMO Harris Bank Center. The team's first five home games were played at Allstate Arena. The Rush won their division with a 10–8 record, but fell in the conference semifinals by a 69–47 score to the Spokane Shock.

== Ownership ==
On November 12, 2012, the Chicago Rush were purchased by a group, headed by Julee White of Testarossa Entertainment, but the purchase was terminated by the AFL three months later due to the ownership's failure to meet league obligations.

On February 7, 2013, the Rush were purchased by Star Rush Football, LLC, an ownership led by private-equity firm manager David Staral Jr. Weeks later, they finalized a deal with Allstate Arena in Rosemont to play all but two home games. The other two home games (June 8 against the Utah Blaze and June 15 versus the San Antonio Talons) will be played at the BMO Harris Bank Center in Rockford, Illinois, which hosted the first "test game" for the AFL in 1986. One week before the season opener, the new ownership group introduced the team's new logo and uniforms, which removed the gray from the logo and replaced it with red. It was reported on May 7, 2013 that Staral Jr. had been ordered by the league to leave the team for not paying league dues, causing the league to take ownership of the Rush yet again.

It was announced on May 24 that the Rush would not play either of its final two home games at Allstate Arena. The league announced on May 30 that the game scheduled for July 13 against the Cleveland Gladiators would be played at BMO Harris Bank Center, while the team's final regular season game against the San Jose SaberCats was changed to a road game to be played at HP Pavilion at San Jose, the home of the SaberCats.

== Standings ==
Central Division
Team	W	L	PCT	PF	PA	DIV	CON	Home	Away
y-Chicago Rush	10	8	.556	973	947	2–2	5–5	3–5	7–3
San Antonio Talons	10	8	.556	782	884	2–2	3–8	4–5	6–3
Iowa Barnstormers	6	12	.333	827	913	2–2	3–7	2–7	4–5

y - Clinched division

== Regular season schedule ==
The Rush began the season by hosting the Iowa Barnstormers on March 23. They closed the regular season against the San Jose SaberCats on the road on July 27.

Week	Day	Date	Kickoff	Opponent	Results		Location	Report
Week	Day	Date	Kickoff	Opponent	Score	Record	Location	Report
1	Saturday	March 23	7:00 p.m. CDT	Iowa Barnstormers	L 41–63	0–1	Allstate Arena	
2	Sunday	March 31	3:00 p.m. CDT	Spokane Shock	L 61–76	0–2	Allstate Arena	
3	Friday	April 5	7:30 p.m. CDT	at San Antonio Talons	W 48–41	1–2	Alamodome	
4	Sunday	April 14	3:00 p.m. CDT	Pittsburgh Power	W 45–14	2–2	Allstate Arena	
5	Saturday	April 20	9:00 p.m. CDT	at Utah Blaze	W 59–56	3–2	EnergySolutions Arena	
6	Friday	April 26	7:05 p.m. CDT	at Iowa Barnstormers	W 64–63 (OT)	4–2	Wells Fargo Arena	
7	Saturday	May 4	7:00 p.m. CDT	Philadelphia Soul	L 41–72	4–3	Allstate Arena	
8	Saturday	May 11	6:00 p.m. CDT	at Cleveland Gladiators	L 50–53	4–4	Quicken Loans Arena	
9	Sunday	May 19	3:00 p.m. CDT	Arizona Rattlers	L 49–56	4–5	Allstate Arena	
10	Saturday	May 25	8:00 p.m. CDT	at New Orleans VooDoo	W 84–48	5–5	New Orleans Arena	
11	Saturday	June 1	6:00 p.m. CDT	at Orlando Predators	W 63–55	6–5	Amway Center	
12	Saturday	June 8	7:00 p.m. CDT	Utah Blaze	W 67–43	7–5	BMO Harris Bank Center	
13	Saturday	June 15	7:00 p.m. CDT	San Antonio Talons	L 54–61	7–6	BMO Harris Bank Center	
14	Saturday	June 22	6:30 p.m. CDT	at Tampa Bay Storm	W 50–49	8–6	Tampa Bay Times Forum	
15	Bye							
16	Saturday	July 6	6:05 p.m. CDT	at Philadelphia Soul	L 26–58	8–7	Wells Fargo Center	
17	Saturday	July 13	7:00 p.m. CDT	Cleveland Gladiators	W 68–32	9–7	BMO Harris Bank Center	
18	Saturday	July 20	8:00 p.m. CDT	at Arizona Rattlers	W 63–42	10–7	US Airways Center	
19	Saturday	July 27	9:30 p.m. CDT	at San Jose SaberCats	L 40–65	10–8	HP Pavilion at San Jose	

=== Playoffs ===
Round	Day	Date	Kickoff	Opponent	Results	Location	Report
NC Semifinals	Thursday	August 1	9:00 p.m. CDT	at Spokane Shock	L 47–69	Spokane Veterans Memorial Arena	

== Final roster ==
2013 Chicago Rush roster
Quarterbacks: 11 Carson Coffman; 3 Luke Drone; Fullbacks: 34 J. J. Payne; Wide receivers: 10 Landon Cox; 1 Reggie Gray; 15 Jared Jenkins; 89 Taurus Johnson	Offensive linemen: 79 Steve Edwards; 66 Jeff Maddux; 75 Colin Madison; 63 Zack McKnight; Defensive linemen: 45 Brian Brikowski; 92 Darrell Campbell; 12 Anthony Hoke; 58 Alex Magee	Linebackers: 7 Tyus Jackson; 8 Kelvin Morris; Defensive backs: 9 Camerron Cheatham; -- Derek Dreher; 4 Vic Hall; 21 Semaj Moody; 13 Jerrell Norton; 5 Josh Pleasant; Kickers: 9 Dan Frantz	Injured Reserve: 14 Jorrick Calvin DB; 91 Derek Walker DL; Refuse to report: 15 Trevor Coston DB; 13 Gino Guidugli QB; 8 Troy McBroom WR; League suspension: 55 Brian McNally DL; 33 Martin Parker DL; 73 Ken Plue OL; 2 Rodney Wright WR; 10 D. J. Woods WR; Inactive Reserve: currently vacant; Recallable reassignment: currently vacant; Other league exempt: 5 Nekos Brown LB; -- Thomas Mayo WR; Emergency hold: 6 Jose Martinez K; rookies in italics Roster updated August 2, 2013; 24 Active, 14 Inactive

== Staff ==
2013 Chicago Rush staff
Front office: Owner – David Staral, Jr.; Executive vice president – Ryan Simmons; Director of football operations – Jon Redmond; Director of Game & Ticket Operations – Craig Bornemeier; Director of Marketing & Public Relations – Mike McLaughlin; Equipment manager – Jeff Henderson	Head coach: Head coach – Bob McMillen; Offensive coaches: Offensive coordinator – Siaha Burley; Defensive coaches: Assistant head coach / defensive coordinator – Walter Housman; Special teams coaches: Special teams coordinator / director of player personnel – Scott Bailey
