= 2013 Utah Blaze season =

Arena Football League team season

- Head coach: Ron James
- Home stadium: EnergySolutions Arena

Results
- Record: 7–11
- Division place: 4th NC West
- Playoffs: Did not qualify

The 2013 Utah Blaze season was the seventh season for the franchise in the Arena Football League. The team was coached by Ron James and played their home games at EnergySolutions Arena. The Blaze missed the playoffs by finishing with a 7–11 record.

== Final roster ==
2013 Utah Blaze roster
Quarterbacks: 10 Tommy Grady; Fullbacks: 43 Ben Stallings; Wide receivers: 1 Braylon Bell; 18 Chase Deadder; 29 DeJay Lester; 21 LaVaughn Macon; 2 Kimble Tillman; 6 Mario Urrutia	Offensive linemen: 50 Jermarcus Hardrick; 75 LaVon McCoy; 69 Antonio Narcisse; 72 Duke Robinson; 71 Shannon Tevaga; Defensive linemen: 44 Mike Alston; 92 Luke Black; 51 Michael Johnson; 57 Keenan Mace	Linebackers: 42 Joe Mortensen; Defensive backs: 9 David Hyland; 5 Arness Ikner; 31 Maurice Leggett; 4 Alfred Phillips; 23 Tony Tatum; Kickers: 12 Kyle Brotzman	Refuse to report: -- Mario Henderson OL; Other league exempt: -- LaMark Brown WR; 85 Caesar Rayford DL; -- Nick Stephens QB; -- Dion Turner DB; Injured reserve: 80 Jovonne Augustus WR; 8 Jason Boltus QB; 80 Paul Cox WR; 2 Josh Ferguson DB; 7 A. J. Jackson WR; 11 Antwan Marsh LB; 97 Julian Miller DL; 77 Neal Tivis OL; Inactive reserve: Currently vacant; League suspension: 22 Aaron Lesué WR; Team suspension: Currently vacant; Recallable reassignment: Currently vacant; Rookies in italics Roster updated July 26, 2013; 24 Active, 14 Inactive

== Standings ==
West Division
Team	W	L	PCT	PF	PA	DIV	CON	Home	Away
z-Arizona Rattlers	15	3	.833	1203	866	4–2	9–3	8–1	7–2
x-Spokane Shock	14	4	.778	1198	896	4–2	8–2	7–2	7–2
x-San Jose SaberCats	13	5	.722	1033	877	3–3	6–4	8–2	5–3
Utah Blaze	7	11	.389	896	988	1–5	3–8	4–5	3–6

z - Clinched division and conference's best record
x - Clinched playoff berth

== Regular season schedule ==
The Blaze began the season by visiting the Pittsburgh Power on March 23. Their first home game was against the Arizona Rattlers on March 29. They closed the regular season at home against the Cleveland Gladiators on July 27.

Week	Day	Date	Kickoff	Opponent	Results		Location	Report
Week	Day	Date	Kickoff	Opponent	Score	Record	Location	Report
1	Saturday	March 23	4:00 p.m. MDT	at Pittsburgh Power	W 64–33	1–0	Consol Energy Center	
2	Friday	March 29	7:30 p.m. MDT	Arizona Rattlers	L 49–77	1–1	EnergySolutions Arena	
3	Saturday	April 6	8:00 p.m. MDT	Tampa Bay Storm	L 65–77	1–2	EnergySolutions Arena	
4	Bye							
5	Saturday	April 20	8:00 p.m. MDT	Chicago Rush	L 56–59	1–3	EnergySolutions Arena	
6	Saturday	April 27	5:00 p.m. MDT	at Cleveland Gladiators	W 57–40	2–3	Quicken Loans Arena	
7	Saturday	May 4	7:00 p.m. MDT	Spokane Shock	W 52–48	3–3	EnergySolutions Arena	
8	Saturday	May 11	7:00 p.m. MDT	at Arizona Rattlers	L 49–65	3–4	US Airways Center	
9	Saturday	May 18	7:00 p.m. MDT	Iowa Barnstormers	W 43–34	4–4	EnergySolutions Arena	
10	Saturday	May 25	8:30 p.m. MDT	at San Jose SaberCats	L 34–35	4–5	HP Pavilion at San Jose	
11	Monday	June 3	6:30 p.m. MDT	at San Antonio Talons	L 41–42	4–6	Alamodome	
12	Saturday	June 8	6:00 p.m. MDT	at Chicago Rush	L 43–67	4–7	BMO Harris Bank Center	
13	Saturday	June 15	7:00 p.m. MDT	Jacksonville Sharks	W 62–55	5–7	EnergySolutions Arena	
14	Friday	June 21	8:00 p.m. MDT	at Spokane Shock	L 41–80	5–8	Spokane Veterans Memorial Arena	
15	Saturday	June 29	7:00 p.m. MDT	San Jose SaberCats	L 49–57	5–9	EnergySolutions Arena	
16	Saturday	July 6	7:00 p.m. MDT	New Orleans VooDoo	L 49–63	5–10	EnergySolutions Arena	
17	Friday	July 12	5:35 p.m. MDT	at Philadelphia Soul	L 39–69	5–11	Wells Fargo Center	
18	Saturday	July 20	6:05 p.m. MDT	at Iowa Barnstormers	W 55–41	6–11	Wells Fargo Arena	
19	Saturday	July 27	7:00 p.m. MDT	Cleveland Gladiators	W 48–46	7–11	EnergySolutions Arena	
