= Gary Butler (linebacker) =

American gridiron football player (born 1984)

No. 20
- Position: Linebacker

Personal information
- Born: November 13, 1984 (age 41); Pittsburgh, Pennsylvania, U.S.
- Listed height: 6 ft 1 in (1.85 m)
- Listed weight: 235 lb (107 kg)

Career information
- High school: Pittsburgh (PA) Langley
- College: California (PA)
- NFL draft: 2008: undrafted

Career history
- Philadelphia Eagles (2008)*; BC Lions (2009); Pittsburgh Power (2011, 2013); Cleveland Gladiators (2014–2015)
- * Offseason or practice squad member only

Career CFL statistics
- Tackles: 6
- Special teams tackles: 11
- Stats at CFL.ca (archived)

Career AFL statistics
- Tackles: 87
- Sacks: 9
- Pass breakups: 12
- Forced fumbles: 5
- Fumble recoveries: 4
- Stats at ArenaFan.com

Gary Butler (born November 13, 1984) is an American former professional football player who was a linebacker in the National Football League (NFL), the Canadian Football League (CFL), and the Arena Football League (AFL). He was signed by the Philadelphia Eagles as an undrafted free agent in 2008. He played college football for the California Vulcans.

== Professional career ==
=== BC Lions ===
Butler signed with the BC Lions of the Canadian Football League in May 2009 and appeared in the first eight 2009 BC Lions season regular games before being released on September 1, 2009.

=== Pittsburgh Power ===
Butler played in 2011 and 2013 for the AFL's Pittsburgh Power.

=== Cleveland Gladiators ===
On April 8, 2014, Butler was assigned to the Cleveland Gladiators. On June 3, 2014, Butler was reassigned by the Gladiators. On June 5, 2014, Butler was again assigned to the Gladiators.

=== Niles Township High Schools ===
In Fall 2022, Butler began working as a PE instructor as well as a football coach at Niles Township High Schools in Skokie, Illinois.
