= Cody Pearcy =

American football player and coach (born 1989)

Current position
- Title: Strength and conditioning coordinator / wide receivers coach
- Team: Birmingham-Southern Panthers

Biographical details
- Born: October 4, 1989 (age 37); Phenix City, Alabama, U.S.
- Education: Huntingdon College (2008–2012)

Playing career
- 2008–2011: Huntingdon
- 2012: Atlanta Falcons (NFL)
- 2013: Cleveland Gladiators (AFL)
- 2013–2014: Columbus Lions (PIFL)
- Position: Wide receiver

Coaching career (HC unless noted)
- 2014–2015: Huntingdon (GA)
- 2016–2017: Birmingham-Southern (WR)
- 2017–present: Birmingham-Southern (S&C/WR)

Accomplishments and honors

Awards
- Huntingdon College all-time leading receiver; Preseason All-American (2010); All-Region (2010); Male Athlete of the Year (2011)

Cody Michael Pearcy (born October 4, 1989) is an American football coach and former player. He currently serves at the strength and conditioning coordinator and wide receivers coach for the Birmingham-Southern Panthers, an NCAA Division III program located in Birmingham, Alabama. He has served in that capacity since 2017. Prior to working as Birmingham-Southern's strength and conditioning coordinator, he was on the staff as the wide receivers coach since 2016. He previously was a graduate assistant at his alma mater, Huntingdon College, in Montgomery, Alabama, from 2014 to 2015. Before coaching college football he played wide receiver at the college level for the Huntingdon Hawks (2008-2011) also of the NCAA Division III. After graduating from Huntingdon College during the spring of 2012 he went undrafted in the 2012 NFL draft. Shortly after he signed with the Atlanta Falcons. He was cut by the Falcons in August 2012 before the start of the 2012 NFL season. After he failed to sign with another National Football League team he signed and played for the Cleveland Gladiators of the Arena Football League for the 2013 season. He was cut following the season. He then signed with the Columbus Lions who were at the time a part of the Professional Indoor Football League (PIFL) in November 2013. He played for the Lions for the 2014 season. He was cut by the Lions in July 2014, ending his professional playing career and returning to Huntingdon College that same month as a graduate assistant.

== Early years ==
Cody Pearcy was born and raised in Phenix City, Alabama. He was the middle child and son of Mike and Cynthia Pearcy. He has an older brother, Clint, and a younger sister, Casey. Pearcy attended Glenwood School where he lettered in football, golf, soccer, and basketball. He was member of back-to-back AISA State Championships in basketball his junior and senior years. His senior year he also helped lead the Glenwood men's soccer team to the 2008 AISA State Championship Game, while also earning Most Valuable Player honors on his soccer team his senior year. He also was named an honorable mention from the Alabama Sports Writer's Association for all-state honors in football his senior year and was by his team and coaches as the Best Defensive Player on his football team.

== College career ==
Pearcy attended and played college football at Huntingdon College in Montgomery, Alabama. He played wide receiver and wore No. 1 for the Hawks' football program under head coach Mike Turk. In his freshman season in 2008, he saw action in seven varsity games and two junior varsity games. He caught two receptions for 19 yards and returned back five punts for 65 yards. In his sophomore season in 2009, he played in 11 games and started nine of them. He led the team with 48 receptions for 769 yards and five touchdowns. He returned 10 punts for 104 yards and 15 kickoffs for 354 yards. As a junior in 2010, Pearcy played in 10 games, starting nine of them, and caught 51 passes for 1,078 yards with 12 touchdowns. He also had three rushing attempts for nine yards and returned three punts for 23 yards and nine kick returns for 121 yards. Pearcy played in and started all 10 games of his senior season in 2011. He recorded 46 receptions for 766 yards and eight touchdowns receiving. He had two rushing attempts for -1 yards and one rushing touchdown. He also had five punt returns for 28 yards and seven kick returns for 135 yards. He ended his collegiate playing career as Huntingdon's all-time leading receiver. He was named as both Preseason All-American and All-Region in 2010 for his junior year. His senior year he was named a team captain and was named Male Athlete of the Year.

=== College statistics ===
Year	Year of Eligibility	GP	GS	Rec.	Yds.	TDs
2008	Freshman	7	0	2	19	0
2009	Sophomore	11	9	48	769	5
2010	Junior	10	9	51	1,078	12
2011	Senior	10	10	46	766	8
Totals	4 yrs.	38	28	147	2,632	25

== Professional career ==
=== Pre-draft ===
Huntindgon College did not host a pro day, so Pearcy attended the pro day hosted by Alabama State, a FCS University located less than one mile away in Montgomery, Alabama. He recorded a 4.31-second 40 yard dash time. He also recorded a 44-inch vertical jump and a 6.67-second time in the three-cone drill as well as a 3.76-second time in the short shuttle.

=== Atlanta Falcons ===
Pearcy went undrafted at the 2012 NFL draft but was immediately signed as an undrafted free agent by the Atlanta Falcons. He was released before the start of the 2012 NFL season.

=== Cleveland Gladiators ===
Pearcy signed with the Cleveland Gladiators of the Arena Football League in 2013. During the 2013 AFL season, Pearcy played as a wide receiver as well as playing some defense. During the season he had nine receptions for 83 yards and three touchdowns as well as returning three kickoffs for 29 yards. On the defensive side of the ball, he recorded 7.5 tackles (seven solo and one assisted) and one fumble recovery. Following the end of the season which saw the Gladiators finish with a disappointing 4-14 record, Pearcy was released from the team.

=== Columbus Lions ===
Pearcy signed with the Columbus Lions of the Professional Indoor Football League. He was cut following the 2014 PIFL season thus ending his playing career.

== Coaching career ==
=== Huntingdon Hawks ===
Following being released by the Columbus Lions and retiring from professional football, Pearcy returned to Huntingdon College as a graduate assistant. He served in this role for two seasons. The 2015 season saw Huntingdon win a USA South Conference Championship and receive a playoff appearance (for just the second time in school history).

=== Birmingham-Southern Panthers ===
In 2016, Pearcy was hired to become the wide receivers coach at Birmingham-Southern. In 2017, he was promoted to strength and conditioning coordinator, while also retaining the position as their wide receivers coach.
