= Bryan Robinson (gridiron football, born 1986) =

American gridiron football player (born 1986)

Profile
- Position: Defensive tackle

Personal information
- Born: January 25, 1986 (age 40); Harrington, Delaware
- Listed height: 6 ft 3 in (1.91 m)
- Listed weight: 297 lb (135 kg)

Career information
- High school: Camden (DE) Caesar Rodney
- College: Wesley College
- NFL draft: 2008: undrafted

Career history
- Arizona Cardinals (2008)*; Manchester Wolves (2009); Hamilton Tiger-Cats (2009)*; New York Sentinels (2009); Milwaukee Iron (2010); Cleveland Gladiators (2010); Kansas City Command (2011); Philadelphia Soul (2012–2015)
- * Offseason or practice squad member only

Awards and highlights
- First-team All-Arena (2013); 2× Second-team All-Arena (2012, 2015)

Career AFL statistics
- Tackles: 165
- Sacks: 41
- Pass Breakups: 20
- Forced Fumbles: 8
- Fumble Recoveries: 4
- Stats at ArenaFan.com

Bryan Philip Robinson (born January 25, 1986) is a professional gridiron football defensive tackle. He was signed by the Arizona Cardinals as an undrafted free agent in 2008. He played college football at Wesley College.

Robinson has also been a member of the Hamilton Tiger-Cats and New York Sentinels. He is currently a free agent.

== Professional career ==
=== Philadelphia Soul ===
Robinson signed with the Philadelphia Soul for the 2012 season. In his first season with the Soul, Robinson had his best arena season, breaking the Soul record for tackles for loss, earning him 2nd Team All-Arena honors. After re-signing with the Soul for 2013, Robinson had yet another outstanding season for the Soul, Robinson finished 5th in the AFL in sacks with 11, and broke his own Soul record for tackles for loss with (17.5). Robinson returned to the Soul in 2015.
