= Virgil Gray =

American football player and coach (born 1984)

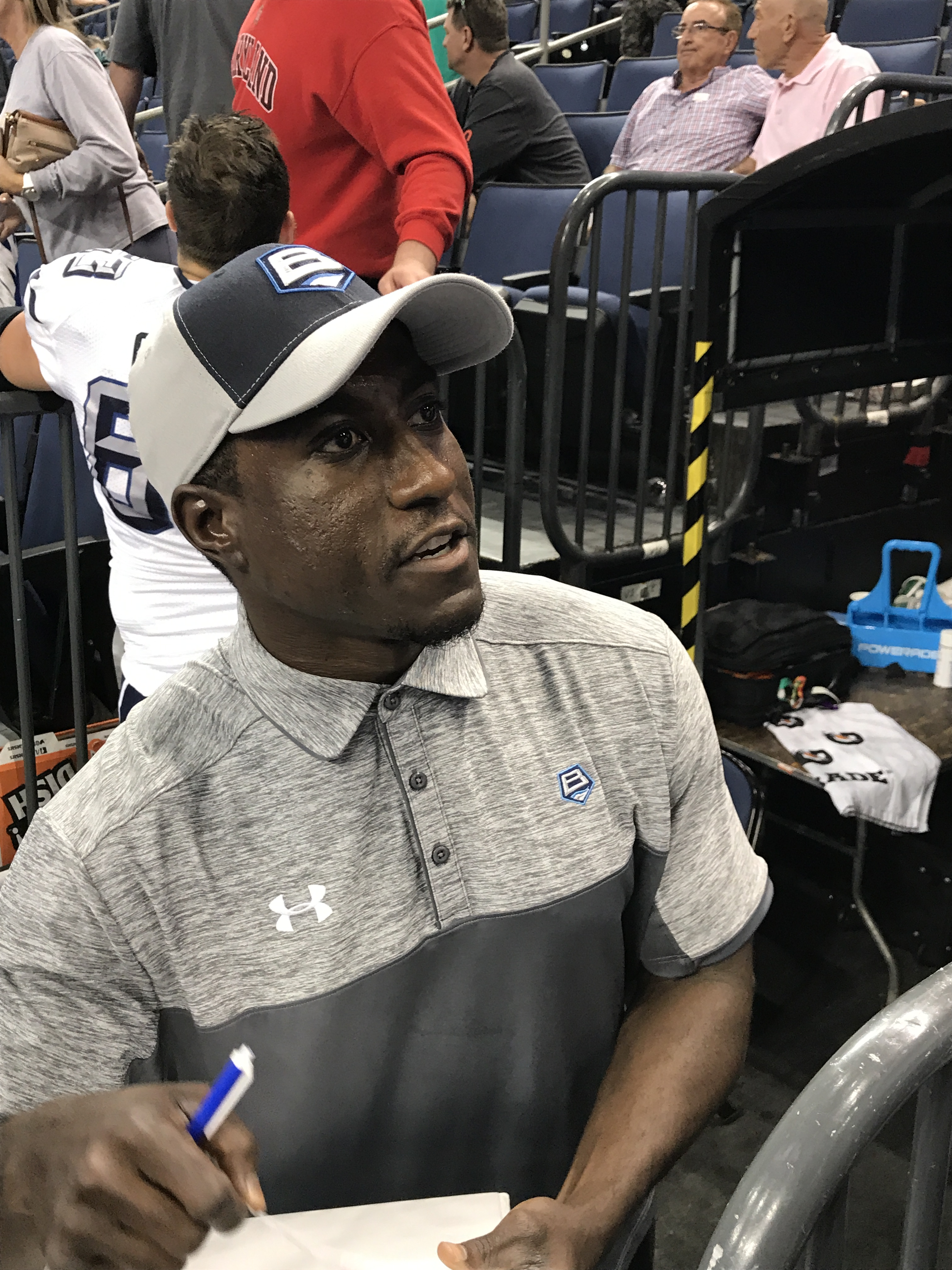
- Gray with the Baltimore Brigade in 2017

No. 4, 29
- Position: Defensive back

Personal information
- Born: March 7, 1984 (age 42); Atlanta, Georgia, U.S.
- Listed height: 5 ft 10 in (1.78 m)
- Listed weight: 185 lb (84 kg)

Career information
- High school: Therrell (Atlanta)
- College: Rhode Island
- NFL draft: 2007: undrafted

Career history

Playing
- Lubbock Renegades (2008); Spokane Shock (2009); Hamilton Tiger-Cats (2009)*; Milwaukee Iron (2010); Arizona Rattlers (2011–2013); Omaha Nighthawks (2011); Pittsburgh Power (2014); San Jose SaberCats (2015); Guangzhou Power (2016); Baltimore Brigade (2018)
- * Offseason or practice squad member only

Coaching
- Baltimore Brigade (2017) Assistant coach

Awards and highlights
- 3× ArenaBowl champion (2012, 2013, 2015); 2× First-team All-Arena (2013, 2018); 2× Second-team All-Arena (DB & KR) (2011); Second-team All-Atlantic 10 (2006)

Career AFL statistics
- Total tackles: 319
- Pass deflections: 106
- Interceptions: 50
- Return yards: 3,097
- Return touchdowns: 9
- Stats at ArenaFan.com

Virgil Carl Gray (born March 7, 1984) is an American former professional football defensive back who played in the Arena Football League (AFL). He played college football for the University of Rhode Island.

== Early life ==
Gray attended Therrell High School in Atlanta, Georgia and was a student and a standout in football and basketball. In football, he was a three-year letterman, and as a senior, he served as a team captain and was an All-City selection. Gray graduated in 2002.

== College career ==
Gray continued his football career at the University of Rhode Island. As a freshman in 2002, Gray red-shirted. Gray would play the next 4 seasons for the Rams, lettering each season, and was named a Second-Team All-Atlantic 10 Conference selection as a senior in 2006.

== Professional career ==
=== af2 years ===
In 2008, Gray signed with the Lubbock Renegades of af2. Gray played the competition of the 2008 season with the Renegades to a 9–7 record, and a berth in the af2 playoffs where they lost in the first round.

In 2009, Gray signed with the Spokane Shock after the Renegades folded. The Shock finished the season 15–1 and won, what happened to be the final, ArenaCup.

=== Milwaukee Iron ===
In 2010, Gray was assigned to the Milwaukee Iron, who had joined a number of other af2 teams in forming Arena Football 1.

=== Arizona Rattlers ===
In 2011, former Shock teammate Nick Davila, convinced Gray to join him on the Arizona Rattlers.

=== Pittsburgh Power ===
Gray signed with the Power on September 14, 2013.

In his first season with the Power, Gray missed 7 games due to a high ankle sprain but still finished with 42 tackles, 23 pass breakups and 11 interceptions returned for 297 yards and 2 touchdowns. Gray also returned 15 kickoffs for 344 yards and 1 touchdown.

=== San Jose SaberCats ===
Gray was assigned to the San Jose SaberCats on September 29, 2014.

=== Guangzhou Power ===
Gray was selected by the Guangzhou Power of the China Arena Football League (CAFL) in the fifteenth round of the 2016 CAFL draft.

=== Baltimore Brigade ===
On March 21, 2018, Gray was assigned to the Baltimore Brigade.

== Coaching career ==
On March 7, 2017, Gray was named to the Baltimore Brigade coaching staff as an assistant coach.
