= Jeron Harvey =

American gridiron football player (born 1967)

No. 3
- Position: Wide receiver

Personal information
- Born: June 25, 1984 (age 42); Jacksonville, Florida, U.S.
- Listed height: 6 ft 5 in (1.96 m)
- Listed weight: 224 lb (102 kg)

Career information
- High school: Andrew Jackson (Jacksonville)
- College: Houston
- NFL draft: 2008: undrafted

Career history
- Jacksonville Jaguars (2008)*; Arkansas Twisters (2009); Toronto Argonauts (2009)*; Jacksonville Sharks (2010–2015, 2017); Florida Tarpons (2017); Monterrey Steel (2017)
- * Offseason or practice squad member only

Awards and highlights
- ArenaBowl champion (2011); Second-team All-Arena (2013)

Career AFL statistics
- Receptions: 495
- Receiving yards: 5,495
- Receiving TDs: 131
- Rushing yards: 57
- Rushing TDs: 4
- Stats at ArenaFan.com

Jeron E. Harvey (born June 25, 1984) is an American former professional football wide receiver. He was signed by the Jacksonville Jaguars as an undrafted free agent in 2008. He played college football at Houston.

Harvey was also a member of the Arkansas Twisters, Toronto Argonauts, Jacksonville Sharks, Florida Tarpons, and Monterrey Steel.

== Early life ==
He graduated from Andrew Jackson High School in Jacksonville, Florida, where his high school teammates included New York Jets running back Leon Washington, Ole Miss wide receiver Michael Hicks and Bethune-Cookman All-American Vernon Edwards.

== College career ==
He was not recruited by Division I teams when he graduated high school; instead, he attended Dodge City Community College in Dodge City, Kansas before transferring to the University of Houston, where he played with Kevin Kolb and Donnie Avery. At Dodge City, he recorded 52 receptions and 14 touchdowns in one year.

== Professional career ==
=== Jacksonville Jaguars ===
He signed as an undrafted rookie free agent with his hometown team, the Jacksonville Jaguars on April 27, 2008. Several of his teammates were also Jacksonville natives: Rashean Mathis attended Englewood High School and Jamaal Fudge went to Ed White High School. Harvey was released by Jacksonville on August 26, 2008.

=== Toronto Argonauts ===
Harvey was signed by the Toronto Argonauts on March 9, 2009. He was released on April 15, 2009.

=== Jacksonville Sharks ===
Harvey signed with the Jacksonville Sharks on January 2, 2010. On August 12, 2011, he caught the game-winning touchdown pass from Aaron Garcia for the Sharks as time expired in ArenaBowl XXIV.

=== Monterrey Steel ===
Harvey signed with the Monterrey Steel on June 21, 2017.
