= Bobby Sewall =

American football player (born 1988)

No. 5
- Position: Wide receiver

Personal information
- Born: February 29, 1988 (age 38); Portsmouth, Rhode Island
- Listed height: 6 ft 0 in (1.83 m)
- Listed weight: 195 lb (88 kg)

Career information
- High school: Portsmouth (RI)
- College: Brown

Career history
- Tennessee Titans (2010)*; Jacksonville Sharks (2012–2014); Tampa Bay Buccaneers (2013)*
- * Offseason or practice squad member only

Career AFL statistics
- Receptions: 52
- Yards: 717
- Touchdowns: 12
- Tackles: 8
- Stats at ArenaFan.com

Bobby Sewall (born February 29, 1988) is an American former football wide receiver. He played college football at Brown University. Led by Head Coach Phil Estes, Sewall scored more points than any Ivy League player during his tenure at Brown. As a sophomore against Dartmouth, he tallied 18 catches for 144 yards, 15 rushes for 141 yards and 4 touchdowns, and threw a 48-yard TD pass; with which he garnered National Player of the Week honors.

At his pro day he ran an official 4.41 in the forty yard dash and recorded a vertical leap of 41.5, which he later bested in the CFL at 42.5in.

== Early life ==
Sewall was born Robert Adelbert Sewall Jr to his parents: Cindy and Robert Sr. on February 29, 1988.

The oldest of four, his sister Caitlin played soccer at Assumption, Megan played basketball at RIC, winning a Little East title and later graduating from NC State University. His brother, Matthew Sewall, was the Gatorade Player of the Year and currently plays wide receiver for Marty Fine at Bryant University.

== Professional career ==
=== Tennessee Titans ===
Sewall was signed by the Titans as an undrafted free agent after the 2010 NFL draft on April 30, 2010.

=== Jacksonville Sharks ===
Sewall joined the Jacksonville Sharks of the Arena Football League in 2011. In 2012, he was re-signed by the team.

=== Tampa Bay Buccaneers ===
On July 27, 2013, Sewall signed with the Tampa Bay Buccaneers. Sewall was waived on August 5, 2013.

== Personal life ==
Sewall established Sewall Financial Group Inc. in 2019, where he serves as President & Founder of a boutique wealth management firm in New York City that specializes in handling high net worth clientele.

After his playing days, Sewall served as the President of the NFLPA NY/NJ Chapter for the maximum, two terms. He has also served as the Vice President twice, and currently is one of nine NFLPA Former Player Board of Directors, a group that is chaired by Priest Holmes. In addition to his role in the NFLPA, Sewall also is the President of his father's charity, Bob's Big Give.
