= Aaron Robbins =

American football player (born 1983)

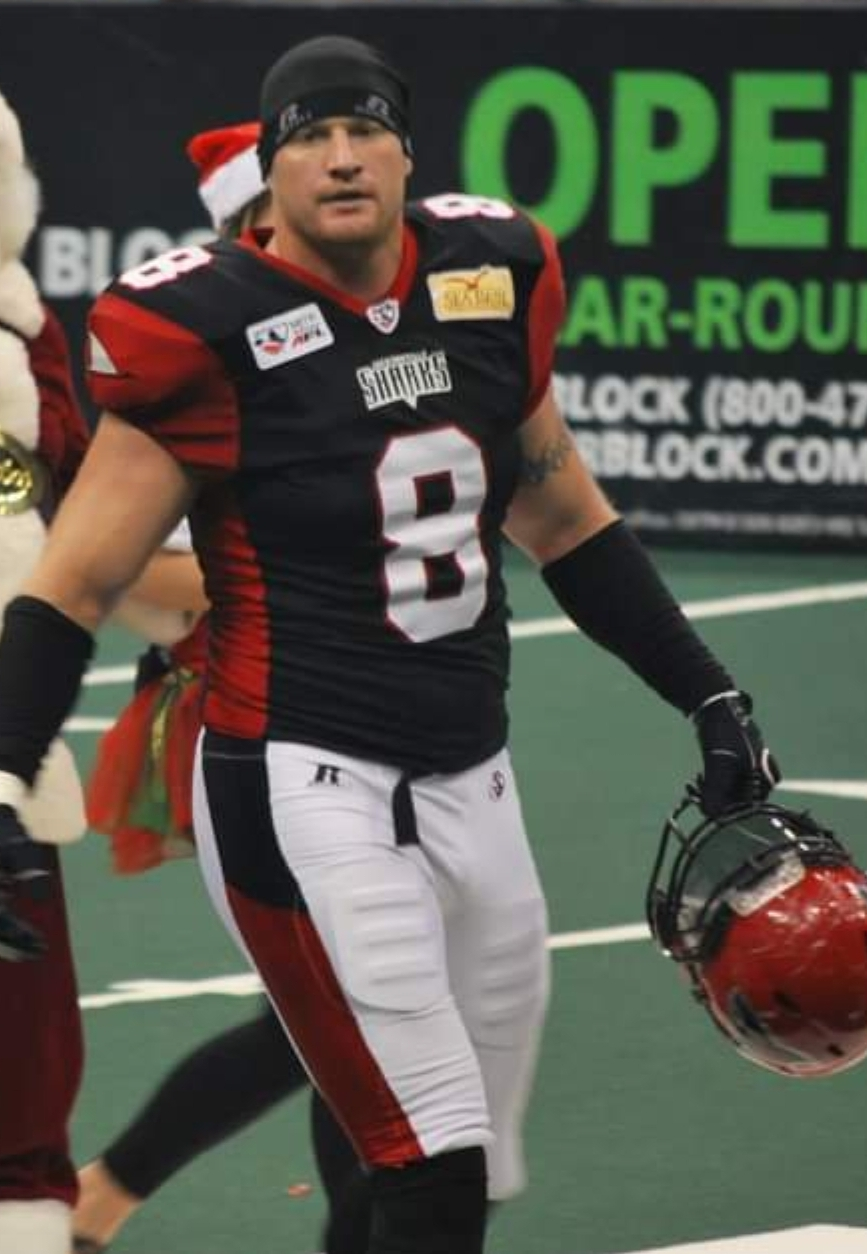
- Robbins with the Jacksonville Sharks

No. 0, 11
- Position: Linebacker

Personal information
- Born: July 16, 1983 (age 43); Aurora, Colorado, U.S.
- Listed height: 6 ft 4 in (1.93 m)
- Listed weight: 285 lb (129 kg)

Career information
- High school: Smoky Hill (Aurora)
- College: Wyoming
- NFL draft: 2007: undrafted

Career history
- Pittsburgh Steelers (2007)*; Spokane Shock (2010); Jacksonville Sharks (2011–2014); Orlando Predators (2015)
- * Offseason or practice squad member only

Awards and highlights
- 2× ArenaBowl champion (2010, 2011); First-team All-Arena (2012); Second-team All-Arena (2013)

Career AFL statistics
- Tackles: 114
- Sacks: 29.5
- Forced fumbles: 11
- Fumble recoveries: 11
- Pass breakups: 9
- Stats at ArenaFan.com

Aaron Robbins (born July 16, 1983) is an American former football linebacker. He played as a tight end and defensive end for the University of Wyoming. In 2007, Robbins signed with the Pittsburgh Steelers as an undrafted free agent.

== Early life ==
Born the son of Robin Sydnor and Robert Robbins, Aaron attended Smoky Hill High School in Aurora, Colorado. Robbins was named first team all-conference as a linebacker, while also being named second team all-conference as a fullback for the Buffalo. In addition, Robbins was named a 5A All-State Honorable Mention as a linebacker.

College recruiting
| Name | Hometown | School | Height | Weight | 40^{‡} | Commit date |
|---|---|---|---|---|---|---|
| Aaron Robbins; TE | Aurora, Colorado | Smoky Hill High School | 6 ft 4 in (1.93 m) | 250 lb (110 kg) | -- | Jul 8, 2001 |
| Aaron Robbins; TE | Recruit ratings: Rivals: | | | | | |
Overall recruit ranking: Rivals: -- (TE), -- (CO)
Note: In many cases, Scout, Rivals, 247Sports, On3, and ESPN may conflict in their listings of height and weight.; In these cases, the average was taken. ESPN grades are on a 100-point scale.; Sources: "Wyoming Football Commitment List". Rivals.; "2002 Team Ranking". Rivals.com.

After not playing a year after high school, Robbins signed with the University of Wyoming on July 8, 2001. Robbins was not heavily recruited, as he did not receive any other FBS scholarship offers.

== College career ==
Robbins played his first two seasons for the Cowboys as a tight end, before volunteering to move to the defensive line his junior season.

=== Statistics ===
| Season | Team | GP | Receiving | | | | Rushing | | | Defensive | | | | |
| Season | Team | GP | Rec | Yds | Avg | TD | Att | Yds | TD | Solo Tkl | Asst Tkl | Total Tkl | Sacks | INT |
|---|---|---|---|---|---|---|---|---|---|---|---|---|---|---|
| 2002 | Wyoming | 11 | 3 | 25 | 8.3 | 1 | 0 | 0 | 0 | 2 | 1 | 3 | 0 | 0 |
| 2003 | Wyoming | 12 | 10 | 64 | 6.4 | 2 | 2 | 3 | 0 | 6 | 1 | 7 | 0 | 0 |
| 2004 | Wyoming | 12 | 0 | 0 | 0.0 | 0 | 0 | 0 | 0 | 23 | 21 | 44 | 2.5 | 1 |
| 2005 | Wyoming | 2 | 0 | 0 | 0.0 | 0 | 0 | 0 | 0 | 5 | 0 | 5 | 1.0 | 0 |
| 2006 | Wyoming | 10 | 0 | 0 | 0.0 | 0 | 0 | 0 | 0 | 16 | 15 | 31 | 4.0 | 0 |
| Totals | | 47 | 13 | 89 | 6.8 | 3 | 2 | 3 | 0 | 51 | 38 | 90 | 7.5 | 1 |
