= Terrance Smith (American football, born 1987) =

American football player (born 1987)

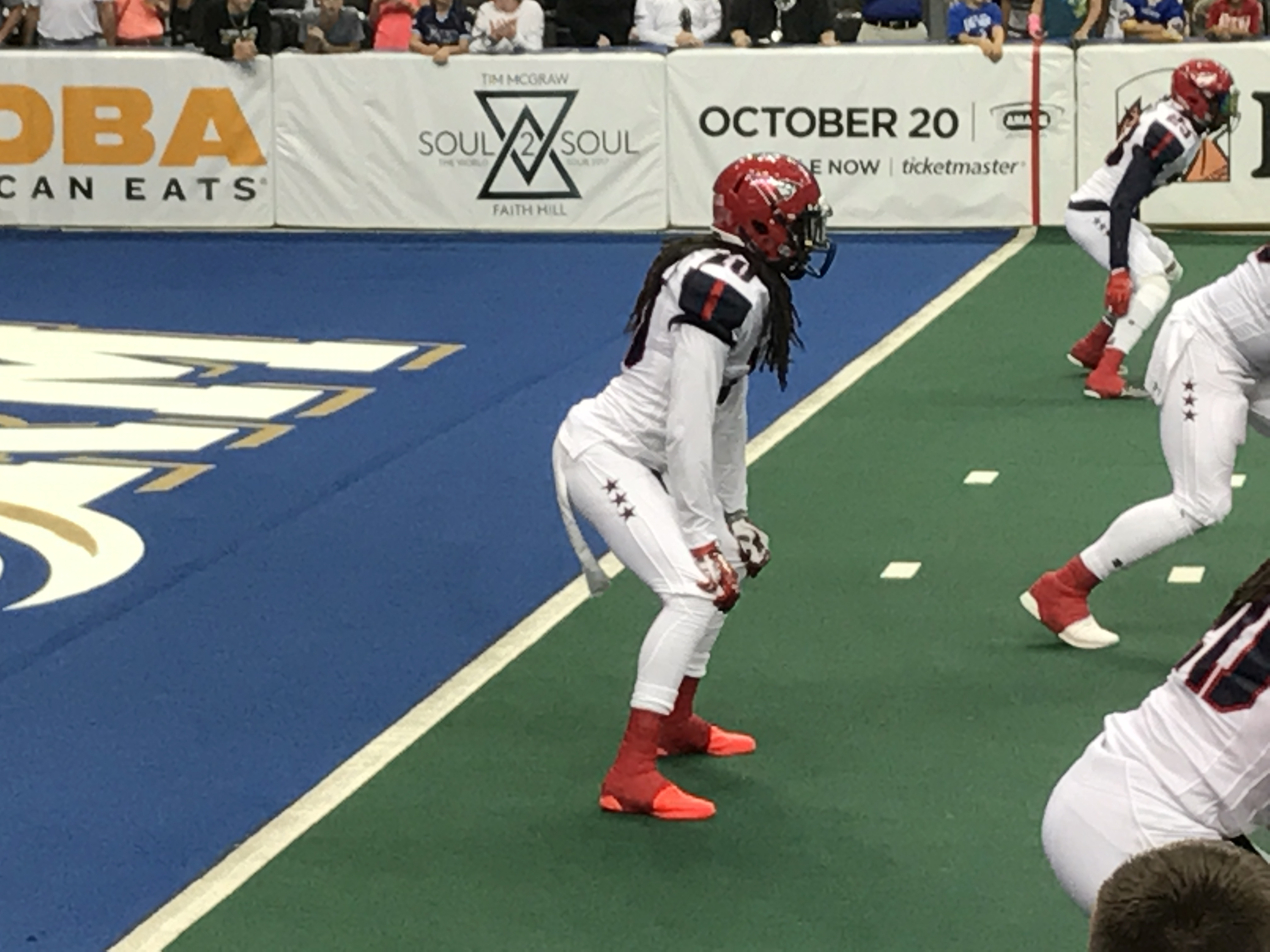
- Smith with the Washington Valor in 2017

No. 13, 2, 10, 5
- Position: Defensive back

Personal information
- Born: February 9, 1987 (age 39); Aiken, South Carolina, U.S.
- Listed height: 6 ft 2 in (1.88 m)
- Listed weight: 200 lb (91 kg)

Career information
- High school: Aiken (SC)
- College: South Carolina State
- NFL draft: 2010: undrafted

Career history
- Green Bay Packers (2010)*; Jacksonville Sharks (2011–2015); Los Angeles KISS (2016); Shenzhen Naja (2016); Washington Valor (2017); Albany Empire (2018–2019)
- * Offseason or practice squad member only

Awards and highlights
- 2× ArenaBowl champion (2011, 2019); First-team All-Arena (2013); AFL All Ironman Team (2012)

Career AFL statistics
- Receptions: 119
- Receiving yards: 1,411
- Total tackles: 336.5
- Interceptions: 34
- Total touchdowns: 46
- Stats at ArenaFan.com

Terrance Smith (born February 9, 1987) is an American former professional football defensive back and wide receiver who played in the Arena Football League (AFL). He played college football at South Carolina State. Smith was signed by the Jacksonville Sharks as an undrafted free agent in 2010.

== Professional career ==
Smith went undrafted in the 2010 NFL draft. On September 27, 2010, Smith signed with the Jacksonville Sharks of the Arena Football League (AFL) for the 2011 AFL season.

On December 1, 2010, Smith was signed to the Green Bay Packers' practice squad. He was placed on practice squad/injured on December 21, 2010. He was released by the Packers on December 29, 2010.

Smith was assigned to the Los Angeles Kiss on November 20, 2015. On March 19, 2016, he was placed on reassignment. Smith was again assigned to the Kiss on June 3, 2016.

Smith was assigned to the Washington Valor on March 1, 2017.

On June 27, 2018, Smith was assigned to the Albany Empire. On April 16, 2019, Smith was again assigned to the Empire.
