= 2013 Arena Football League season =

- League: Arena Football League
- Sport: Arena football
- Duration: March 23, 2013 – August 17, 2013

Regular season
- Season champions: Arizona Rattlers
- Season MVP: Erik Meyer, SPO

AFL playoffs
- American Conference champions: Philadelphia Soul
- American Conference runners-up: Jacksonville Sharks
- National Conference champions: Arizona Rattlers
- National Conference runners-up: Spokane Shock

ArenaBowl XXVI
- Champions: Arizona Rattlers
- Runners-up: Philadelphia Soul
- Finals MVP: Rod Windsor, ARZ

AFL seasons
- ← 2012 2014 →

American: East, South
National: West, Central

The 2013 Arena Football League season was the 26th season in the history of the league. The regular season began on March 23, 2013, with a five-game slate, the first of which to kick off being between the Utah Blaze and the Pittsburgh Power, and ended on July 27, 2013, with the Utah Blaze and Cleveland Gladiators as the last game to kick off. The Arizona Rattlers defeated the Philadelphia Soul by a 48–39 score in ArenaBowl XXVI to conclude the league's playoffs.

== League business ==
=== Teams ===
The league dropped to 14 teams during the offseason. The Kansas City Command ceased operations on August 23, 2012, as well as the Georgia Force on October 14, 2012. The Milwaukee Mustangs suspended operations for 2013, eyeing a return to play in the 2014 season.

=== Television ===
It was announced on November 13, 2012, that the league had reached an agreement with CBS Sports Network to air 19 regular-season games, as well as two playoff games. The network was scheduled to air the league's "game of the week" each Saturday. The main CBS network was to televise ArenaBowl XXVI on August 17, 2013.

== Regular season standings ==
American Conference
East Division
Team	W	L	PCT	PF	PA	DIV	CON	Home	Away
^{(2)} Philadelphia Soul	12	6	.667	1052	839	2–2	6–3	5–4	7–2
Cleveland Gladiators^{[a]}	4	14	.222	847	1047	2–2	3–7	3–6	1–8
Pittsburgh Power	4	14	.222	726	1014	2–2	4–8	1–8	3–6
South Division
Team	W	L	PCT	PF	PA	DIV	CON	Home	Away
^{(1)} Jacksonville Sharks^{[b]}	12	6	.667	941	883	6–0	11–0	6–3	6–3
^{(3)} Orlando Predators^{[c]}	7	11	.389	965	1032	2–4	5–7	4–5	3–6
^{(4)} Tampa Bay Storm	7	11	.389	959	980	2–4	4–6	2–7	5–4
New Orleans VooDoo	5	13	.278	833	1069	2–4	4–6	3–6	2–7
National Conference
Central Division
Team	W	L	PCT	PF	PA	DIV	CON	Home	Away
^{(2)} Chicago Rush^{[d]}	10	8	.556	973	947	2–2	5–5	3–5	7–3
San Antonio Talons	10	8	.556	782	884	2–2	3–8	4–5	6–3
Iowa Barnstormers	6	12	.333	827	913	2–2	3–7	2–7	4–5
West Division
Team	W	L	PCT	PF	PA	DIV	CON	Home	Away
^{(1)} Arizona Rattlers	15	3	.833	1203	866	4–2	9–3	8–1	7–2
^{(3)} Spokane Shock	14	4	.778	1198	896	4–2	8–2	7–2	7–2
^{(4)} San Jose SaberCats	13	5	.722	1033	877	3–3	6–4	8–2	5–3
Utah Blaze	7	11	.389	896	988	1–5	3–8	4–5	3–6

Eight teams qualify for the playoffs: four teams from each conference, of which two are division champions and the other two have the best records of the teams remaining.

Key: Conference and division champion • Division champion • Clinched playoff berth

=== Tie-breakers ===
- ^{a} Cleveland finished in second place in the East Division based on their greater point differential in head-to-head competition with Pittsburgh.
- ^{b} Jacksonville clinched the American Conference's No. 1 seed based on their win over Philadelphia.
- ^{c} Orlando clinched the American Conference's No. 3 seed based on a greater conference record than Tampa Bay.
- ^{d} Chicago clinched the Central Division based on their greater point differential in games against common opponents with San Antonio.

== Playoffs ==
Conference Semifinals
1	Jacksonville	69
4	Tampa Bay	62
American Conference
2	Philadelphia	59
3	Orlando	55
1	Arizona	59
4	San Jose	49
National Conference
2	Chicago	47
3	Spokane	69

Conference Championship
1	Jacksonville	59
2	Philadelphia	75
1	Arizona	65
3	Spokane	57

ArenaBowl XXVI
A2	Philadelphia	39
N1	Arizona	48

- Note: Due to "arena conflicts," the Chicago Rush did not host the playoff game.

=== Conference semifinals ===
Conference	Date	Kickoff	Away	Home	Final score	Game site	Recap
National	August 1	10:00 p.m. EDT	Chicago Rush	Spokane Shock	Spokane, 67–49	Spokane Veterans Memorial Arena	
American	August 3	7:00 p.m. EDT	Tampa Bay Storm	Jacksonville Sharks	Jacksonville, 69–62	Jacksonville Veterans Memorial Arena	
American	August 3	7:05 p.m. EDT	Orlando Predators	Philadelphia Soul	Philadelphia, 59–55	Wells Fargo Center	
National	August 4	8:00 p.m. EDT	San Jose SaberCats	Arizona Rattlers	Arizona, 59–49	US Airways Center	

=== Conference championships ===
Conference	Date	Kickoff	Away	Home	Final score	Game site	Recap
American	August 10	7:00 p.m. EDT	Philadelphia Soul	Jacksonville Sharks	Philadelphia, 75–59	Jacksonville Veterans Memorial Arena	
National	August 10	9:00 p.m. EDT	Spokane Shock	Arizona Rattlers	Arizona, 65–57	US Airways Center	

=== ArenaBowl XXVI ===
Date	Kickoff	Away	Home	Final score	Game site	Recap
August 17	1:00 p.m. EDT	Philadelphia Soul	Arizona Rattlers	Arizona, 48–39	Amway Center	

== All-Arena team ==
Offense
Position	First team	Second team
Quarterback	Erik Meyer, Spokane	Nick Davila, Arizona
Fullback	Derrick Ross, Philadelphia	Odie Armstrong, Arizona
Wide receiver	Adron Tennell, Spokane; Joe Hills, Tampa Bay; Anthony Jones, Philadelphia	Rod Windsor, Arizona; Reggie Gray, Chicago; Jeron Harvey, Jacksonville
Center	Brennen Carvalho, Philadelphia	Billy Eisenhardt, Arizona
Offensive lineman	Christian Johnson, Philadelphia; Rich Ranglin, Arizona	Michael Huey, Arizona; George Bussey, San Jose

Defense
Position	First team	Second team
Defensive end	Joe Sykes, San Antonio; Bryan Robinson, Philadelphia	Mike Lewis, Iowa; Jerry Turner, Jacksonville
Nose guard	Tim McGill, San Antonio	Jason Stewart, San Jose
Middle linebacker	Francis Maka, San Jose	Aaron Robbins, Jacksonville
Jack linebacker	Jamar Ransom, San Antonio	Huey Whittaker, San Jose
Defensive back	Clevan Thomas, San Jose; Virgil Gray, Arizona; Terrance Smith, Jacksonville	Rayshaun Kizer, Philadelphia; Arkeith Brown, Arizona; Fred Shaw, San Antonio

Special teams
Position	First team	Second team
Kicker	Garrett Lindholm, Arizona	Carlos Martinez, Philadelphia
Kick returner	Terrance Sanders, Spokane	Dominic Jones, Orlando
