= ArenaBowl XXVI =

Annual league championship game

Philadelphia Soul (American)	Arizona Rattlers (National)
39	48
	1	2	3	4	Total
PHI	7	14	6	12	39
ARI	7	17	7	17	48
- Date: August 17, 2013
- Stadium: Amway Center; Orlando, Florida
- MVP: Rod Windsor, Arizona: Rod Windsor, Arizona (Offensive Player of the Game); Virgil Gray, Arizona (Defensive Player of the Game)
- Attendance: 12,039
- Winning coach: Kevin Guy
- Losing coach: Clint Dolezel

TV in the United States
- Network: CBS
- Announcers: Andrew Catalon, Anthony Herron, Sherdrick Bonner, Ari Wolfe

ArenaBowl XXVI was the 26th edition of the championship in the Arena Football League. The National Conference champion Arizona Rattlers, defeated the American Conference champion Philadelphia Soul, 48–39. The game was played on August 17, 2013, at Amway Center in Orlando, Florida, home of the Orlando Predators.

The two teams met one year earlier in ArenaBowl XXV, in which the Rattlers took home the league championship by a score of 72–54. This was the first time that two teams met in consecutive ArenaBowls.

ArenaBowl XXVI's week was produced by Ryan Johnston of InterPhase Entertainment, LLC who was brought on to produce the Gala, the KISS concert at the Amway Center in Orlando the night before the game, and production of ArenaBowl XXVI itself that was seen LIVE on CBS. InterPhase Entertainment, LLC produced the 800 person AFL Awards Gala where KISS gave a 30-minute acoustic performance in their suits, after their new team the LA KISS was announced at a press conference also overseen by InterPhase.

== Venue ==
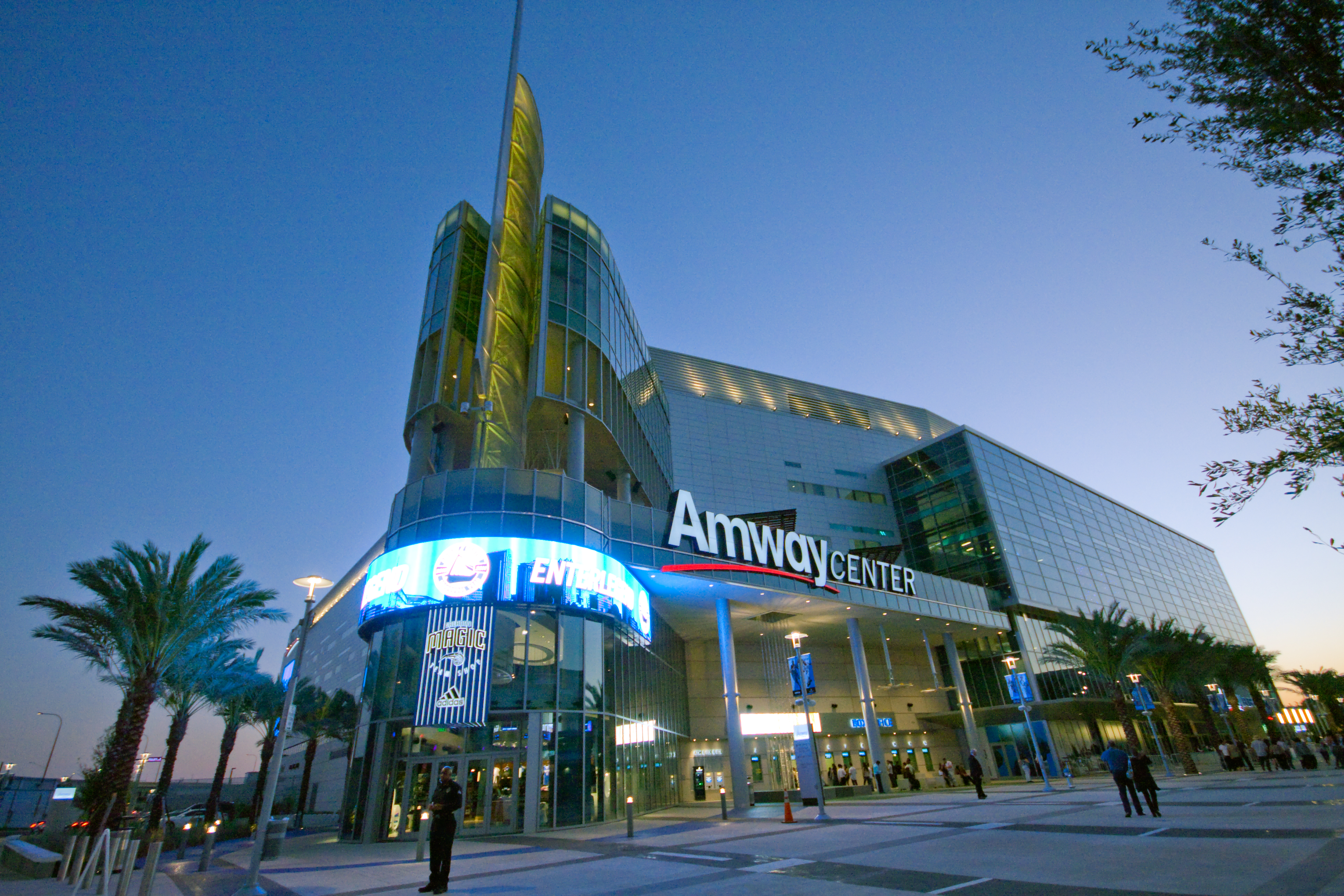
The event was held at the Amway Center in Orlando, Florida.

ArenaBowl XXVI was played at Amway Center in Orlando, Florida, after a unanimous vote by all 14 teams in the league. It was the second consecutive ArenaBowl to be played at a neutral site, and the seventh in the history of the league. For the city of Orlando, it was the first ArenaBowl played there since ArenaBowl XIV in 2000 when the Orlando Predators defeated the Nashville Katz at the since-demolished Amway Arena.

== Television ==
ArenaBowl XXVI was televised by CBS, as part of a two-year agreement between the league and the network to air weekly regular season games, as well as two postseason games, on CBS Sports Network.

== Background ==
=== Philadelphia Soul ===
The Soul reached the ArenaBowl for the second consecutive season, having lost to the Rattlers in ArenaBowl XXV. They began the 2013 season with a 4–4 record, but proceeded to win eight of their ten remaining regular season games to clinch their division again with a 12–6 record. In the conference semifinals, they defeated the Orlando Predators in a back-and-forth affair by a 59–55 score. In the conference championship, they faced the Jacksonville Sharks as they had in the previous season. Philadelphia won the game on the road 75–59 to earn their third ArenaBowl berth in franchise history.

Week	Date	Opponent	Result
1	March 23	at Arizona	L 52–66
2	Bye		
3	April 6	at Orlando	W 61–33
4	April 13	at Iowa	W 54–43
5	April 20	Cleveland	L 57–64 (OT)
6	April 27	Jacksonville	L 53–55
7	May 4	at Chicago	W 72–41
8	May 11	Pittsburgh	L 48–53
9	May 18	Orlando	W 61–51
10	May 25	at Tampa Bay	W 73–55
11	June 1	Arizona	L 57–64
12	June 8	New Orleans	W 65–56
13	June 15	at Pittsburgh	W 59–21
14	June 22	Iowa	W 54–30
15	June 29	at Cleveland	W 66–57
16	July 6	Chicago	W 56–28
17	July 12	Utah	W 69–39
18	July 20	at San Jose	W 65–43
19	July 27	at San Antonio	L 28–42
–	August 3	Orlando	W 59–55
–	August 10	at Jacksonville	W 75–59

=== Arizona Rattlers ===
The Rattlers came into the game as defending champions, having defeated Philadelphia in ArenaBowl XXV. In 2013, the Rattlers finished the regular season with a 15–3 record, one win short of matching a franchise record. With home field advantage in the playoffs, they defeated the San Jose SaberCats in the conference semifinals 59–49, and then the Spokane Shock in the conference championship 65–57. Arizona made their eighth ArenaBowl appearance, and it was also the third consecutive season that the Rattlers made it to the league championship.

Week	Date	Opponent	Result
1	March 23	Philadelphia	W 66–52
2	March 29	at Utah	W 77–49
3	April 6	San Jose	W 73–47
4	April 12	at Spokane	L 49–66
5	April 20	San Antonio	W 83–40
6	April 28	Orlando	W 82–42
7	May 4	at Jacksonville	W 58–48
8	May 11	Utah	W 65–49
9	May 19	at Chicago	W 56–49
10	May 25	Iowa	W 70–26
11	June 1	at Philadelphia	W 64–57
12	June 8	at San Antonio	W 70–21
13	June 15	Spokane	W 59–42
14	June 22	at San Jose	W 42–72
15	Bye		
16	July 6	at Orlando	W 84–56
17	July 13	New Orleans	W 79–42
18	July 20	Chicago	L 42–63
19	July 27	at Iowa	W 84–45
–	August 4	San Jose	W 59–49
–	August 10	Spokane	W 65–57

== Box score ==
Quarter	1	2	3	4	Total
Soul (AC)	7	14	6	12	39
Rattlers (NC)	7	17	7	17	48

at Amway Center, Orlando, Florida

- Date: August 17, 2013
- Game time: 1:00 p.m. EDT
- Game attendance: 12,039
