= West Division (AFL) =

Division of the Arena Football League

West
- Conference: National Conference
- League: Arena Football League
- Sport: Arena football
- Founded: 1992 (as the Western Division, as a member of the American Conference)
- Most recent champion: Arizona Rattlers (10th title)
- Most titles: Arizona Rattlers (10 titles)

The Western Division was one of four divisions that previously made up the Arena Football League. The Western Division was formed in 1992 when the AFL first split into three divisions. The League used only conferences in 1993 and 1994, but returned to division play in 1995. Because the number of active AFL teams has decreased greatly in recent years, the league no longer uses divisions.

== Division lineups ==
1992

- Arizona Rattlers
- Dallas Texans
- Sacramento Attack
- San Antonio Force

Creation of the Western Division. Arizona, Sacramento, and San Antonio are enfranchised. San Antonio folded in 1993 as the AFL realigned into the American/National conference format, suspending the Western Division (for two years) as well. Also in the 1993 season, Sacramento Attack joined the National Conference as they move to Miami, Florida as the Hooters.

1995

- Arizona Rattlers
- Las Vegas Sting
- San Jose SaberCats

The Western Division returned as an American Conference division. San Jose SaberCats enfranchised.

1996

- Anaheim Piranhas
- Arizona Rattlers
- Minnesota Fighting Pike
- San Jose SaberCats

Las Vegas moved to Anaheim as the Piranhas. Minnesota Fighting Pike enfranchised.

1997

- Anaheim Piranhas
- Arizona Rattlers
- San Jose SaberCats

Minnesota folded.

1998–1999

- Arizona Rattlers
- Portland Forest Dragons
- San Jose SaberCats

Anaheim folded. Portland moved in from the American Conference's Central Division.

2000

- Arizona Rattlers
- Los Angeles Avengers
- Oklahoma Wranglers
- San Jose SaberCats

Los Angeles Avengers enfranchised. Portland moved to Oklahoma City as Oklahoma Wranglers.

2001

- Arizona Rattlers
- Houston Thunderbears
- Los Angeles Avengers
- Oklahoma Wranglers
- San Jose SaberCats

Houston moved in from the Central Division.

2002

- Arizona Rattlers
- Dallas Desperados
- Los Angeles Avengers
- San Jose SaberCats

Dallas Desperados enfranchised. Houston and Oklahoma folded.

2003

- Arizona Rattlers
- Colorado Crush
- Los Angeles Avengers
- San Jose SaberCats

Colorado Crush enfranchised. Dallas moved to Central Division

2004–2005

- Arizona Rattlers
- Las Vegas Gladiators
- Los Angeles Avengers
- San Jose SaberCats

Colorado moved to Central Division. Las Vegas moved in from National Conference's Eastern Division.

2006–2007

- Arizona Rattlers
- Las Vegas Gladiators
- Los Angeles Avengers
- San Jose SaberCats
- Utah Blaze

Utah Blaze enfranchised.

2008

- Arizona Rattlers
- Los Angeles Avengers
- San Jose SaberCats
- Utah Blaze

Las Vegas moved to Cleveland, rejoining the Eastern Division. In 2009, the AFL was put on a one-year hiatus as Los Angeles Avengers folded, San Jose suspended, and Utah played for the AIFA's 2009 season.

2010

- Arizona Rattlers
- Spokane Shock
- Utah Blaze

The Western Division moved to the National Conference. Spokane moved in from the now-defunct AF2. Utah moved back from AIFA.

2011–2013

- Arizona Rattlers
- San Jose SaberCats
- Spokane Shock
- Utah Blaze

San Jose returned.

2014

- Arizona Rattlers
- Los Angeles Kiss
- San Antonio Talons

Los Angeles Kiss enfranchised, Utah folded, San Jose and Spokane moved to the Pacific Division.

2015

- Arizona Rattlers
- Los Angeles Kiss
- Las Vegas Outlaws

Las Vegas Outlaws enfranchised, San Antonio went dormant.

Divisions were discontinued after the 2015 season.

== Division Champions ==
Season	Team	Record	Playoff Results
Western Division
1992	Dallas Texans	5–5	Won Quarterfinals (Firebirds) 48–45; Lost Semifinals (at Drive) 14–57
American Conference
1995	San Jose SaberCats	8–4	Lost Quarterfinals (Predators) 37–55
1996	Arizona Rattlers	11–3	Won Quarterfinals (Predators) 65–48; Lost Semifinals (at Storm) 54–55
1997	Arizona Rattlers	12–2	Won Quarterfinals (Mustangs) 46–29; Won Semifinals (Storm) 49–46 (OT); Won ArenaBowl XI (Barnstormers) 55–33
1998	Arizona Rattlers	10–4	Won Quarterfinals (Thunderbears) 50–36; Lost Semifinals (Predators) 33–38
1999	Arizona Rattlers	10–4	Won Quarterfinals (Kats) 34–30; Lost Semifinals (at Firebirds) 47–73
2000	San Jose SaberCats	12–2	Won Quarterfinals (Wranglers) 63–40; Lost Semifinals (Kats) 42–51
2001	San Jose SaberCats	10–4	Won Quarterfinals (Rattlers) 68–49; Lost Semifinals (at Kats) 47–71
2002	San Jose SaberCats	13–1	Won Quarterfinals (Storm) 55–48; Won Semifinals (Predators) 52–40; Won ArenaBowl XVI (Rattlers) 52–14
2003	San Jose SaberCats	12–4	Won Quarterfinals (Force) 69–48; Lost Semifinals (Rattlers) 49–66
2004	Arizona Rattlers	11–5	Won Quarterfinals (Avengers) 59–42; Won Semifinals (Crush) 45–41; Lost ArenaBowl XVIII (SaberCats) 62–69
2005	Los Angeles Avengers	10–6	Lost AC Semifinals (Rush) 45–52
2006	San Jose SaberCats	10–6	Won AC Divisional Playoffs (Rattlers) 62–48; Lost AC Championship (Rush) 56–59
2007	San Jose SaberCats	13–3	Won AC Divisional Playoffs (Crush) 76–67; Won AC Championship (Rush) 61–49; Won ArenaBowl XXI (vs. Destroyers) 55–33
2008	San Jose SaberCats	11–5	Won AC Divisional Playoffs (Crush) 64–51; Won AC Championship (Rampage) 81–55; Lost ArenaBowl XXII (vs. Soul) 56–59
National Conference
2010	Spokane Shock	13–3	Won NC Semifinals (Rattlers) 57–49; Won NC Championship (Iron) 60–57; Won ArenaBowl XXIII (Storm) 69–57
2011	Arizona Rattlers	16–2	Won NC Semifinals (Shock) 62–33; Won NC Championship (Rush) 54–48; Lost ArenaBowl XXIV (Sharks) 70–73
2012	Arizona Rattlers	13–5	Won NC Semifinals (SaberCats) 51–48; Won NC Championship (Blaze) 75–69; Won ArenaBowl XXV (vs. Soul) 72–54
2013	Arizona Rattlers	15–3	Won NC Semifinals (SaberCats) 59–49; Won NC Championship (Shock) 65–57; Won ArenaBowl XXVI (vs. Soul) 48–39
2014	Arizona Rattlers	15–3	Won NC Semifinals (Shock) 55–28; Won NC Championship (SaberCats) 72–56; Won ArenaBowl XXVII (at Gladiators) 72–32
2015	Arizona Rattlers	14–4	Won NC Semifinals (Shock) 72–41; Lost NC Championship (at SaberCats) 67–70

== Wild Card qualifiers ==
Season	Team	Record	Playoff Results
Western Division
1992	Sacramento Attack	4–6	Lost Quarterfinals (at Drive) 23–48
American Conference
1995	Arizona Rattlers	7–5	Lost Quarterfinals (Barnstormers) 52–56
1996	Anaheim Piranhas	9–5	Lost Quarterfinals (at Storm) 16–30
1997	San Jose SaberCats	8–6	Lost Quarterfinals (at Barnstormers) 59–68
1998	San Jose SaberCats	7–7	Lost Quarterfinals (at Storm) 46–65
2000	Arizona Rattlers	12–2	Won Wild Card Round (Destroyers) 41–34; Won Quarterfinals (at Firebirds) 53–50; Lost Semifinals (at Predators) 44–56
2000	Oklahoma Wranglers	7–7	Won Wild Card Round (at Sea Wolves) 52–38; Lost Quarterfinals (at SaberCats) 40–63
2001	Arizona Rattlers	8–6	Won Wild Card Round (Fury) 52–44; Lost Quarterfinals (at SaberCats) 49–68
2002	Arizona Rattlers	11–3	Won Quarterfinals (Cobras) 61–59; Won Semifinals (Rush) 46–35; Lost ArenaBowl XVI (at SaberCats) 14–52
2002	Los Angeles Avengers	8–6	Lost Wild Card Round (Storm) 41–66
2002	Dallas Desperados	7–7	Won Wild Card Round (Firebirds) 47–46; Lost Quarterfinals (at Rush) 47–60
2003	Los Angeles Avengers	11–5	Lost Quarterfinals (Rattlers) 63–70
2003	Arizona Rattlers	10–6	Won Wild Card Round (Gladiators) 69–26; Won Quarterfinals (at Avengers) 70–63; Won Semifinals (at SaberCats) 66–49; Lost ArenaBowl XVII (at Storm) 29–43
2004	San Jose SaberCats	11–5	Won Quarterfinals (Storm) 56–52; Won Semifinals (Rush) 49–35; Won ArenaBowl XVIII (at Rattlers) 69–62
2004	Los Angeles Avengers	9–7	Lost Quarterfinals (at Rattlers) 42–59
2005	San Jose SaberCats	9–7	Lost AC Semifinals (at Crush) 48–56
2006	Arizona Rattlers	8–8	Won AC Wild Card Playoffs (Blaze) 57–34; Lost AC Divisional Playoffs (at SaberCats) 48–62
2006	Utah Blaze	7–9	Lost AC Wild Card Playoffs (at Rattlers) 34–57
2007	Los Angeles Avengers	9–7	Won AC Wild Card Playoffs (Blaze) 64–42; Lost AC Divisional Playoffs (at Rush) 20–52
2007	Utah Blaze	8–8	Lost AC Wild Card Playoffs (at Avengers) 42–64
2008	Arizona Rattlers	8–8	Lost AC Wild Card Playoffs (Rampage) 41–48
2008	Utah Blaze	6–10	Lost AC Wild Card Playoffs (Crush) 44–49
National Conference
2010	Arizona Rattlers	10–6	Lost NC Semifinals (at Shock) 49–57
2011	Spokane Shock	9–9	Lost NC Semifinals (at Rattlers) 33–62
2012	San Jose SaberCats	12–6	Lost NC Semifinals (at Rattlers) 48–51
2012	Utah Blaze	12–6	Won NC Semifinals (at Talons) 35–34; Lost NC Championship (at Rattlers) 69–75
2013	Spokane Shock	14–4	Won NC Semifinals (at Rush) 69–47; Lost NC Championship (at Rattlers) 57–65
2013	San Jose SaberCats	13–5	Lost NC Semifinals (at Rattlers) 49–59
