= 2012 Milwaukee Mustangs season =

Arena Football League team season

- Head coach: Bob Landsee
- Home stadium: BMO Harris Bradley Center (Renamed from Bradley Center on May 21, 2012)

Results
- Record: 5–13
- Division place: 3rd AC East
- Playoffs: Did not qualify

The 2012 Milwaukee Mustangs season was the fourth season for the franchise, and the third in the Arena Football League (AFL). The team was coached by Bob Landsee and played their home games at BMO Harris Bradley Center. The Mustangs finished the season 5–13 and did not qualify for the playoffs. Following this season, the Mustangs announced that they would suspend operations for 2013, with the hope of returning to play in 2014.

== Standings ==
East Division
Team	W	L	PCT	PF	PA	DIV	CON	Home	Away
z-Philadelphia Soul	15	3	.833	1228	919	4–2	12–2	7–2	8–1
Cleveland Gladiators	8	10	.444	879	875	4–2	6–8	5–4	3–6
Milwaukee Mustangs	5	13	.278	960	1062	3–3	4–7	2–6	3–7
Pittsburgh Power	5	13	.278	827	963	1–5	4–9	1–8	4–5

z - Clinched division and conference's best record

== Schedule ==
The Mustangs had a bye week during the season's opening week, and began the season on the road in week 2 against the Arizona Rattlers on March 17. Their first home game was on March 29 when they hosted the Pittsburgh Power. They finished the regular season on the road against the Orlando Predators.

Week	Day	Date	Kickoff	Opponent	Results		Location	Report
Week	Day	Date	Kickoff	Opponent	Score	Record	Location	Report
1	Bye							
2	Saturday	March 17	8:00 pm CDT	at Arizona Rattlers	L 65–71	0–1	US Airways Center	
3	Friday	March 23	7:00 pm CDT	at New Orleans VooDoo	W 65–42	1–1	New Orleans Arena	
4	Thursday	March 29	7:00 pm CDT	Pittsburgh Power	W 63–40	2–1	Bradley Center	
5	Bye							
6	Saturday	April 14	9:00 pm CDT	at Spokane Shock	L 26–57	2–2	Spokane Veterans Memorial Arena	
7	Saturday	April 21	7:00 pm CDT	at Chicago Rush	L 61–62	2–3	Allstate Arena	
8	Saturday	April 28	7:00 pm CDT	Utah Blaze	L 58–61	2–4	Bradley Center	
9	Saturday	May 5	6:05 pm CDT	at Philadelphia Soul	W 64–63	3–4	Wells Fargo Center	
10	Friday	May 11	7:00 pm CDT	Cleveland Gladiators	L 48–69	3–5	Bradley Center	
11	Friday	May 18	7:00 pm CDT	Georgia Force	L 55–58	3–6	Bradley Center	
12	Saturday	May 26	6:30 pm CDT	at Tampa Bay Storm	L 55–63	3–7	Tampa Bay Times Forum	
13	Saturday	June 2	7:00 pm CDT	San Jose SaberCats	W 81–68	4–7	BMO Harris Bradley Center	
14	Friday	June 8	7:00 pm CDT	Philadelphia Soul	L 62–69	4–8	BMO Harris Bradley Center	
15	Saturday	June 16	6:30 pm CDT	at Pittsburgh Power	W 63–62	5–8	Consol Energy Center	
16	Friday	June 22	7:00 pm CDT	Arizona Rattlers	L 37–52	5–9	BMO Harris Bradley Center	
17	Friday	June 29	7:00 pm CDT	at Cleveland Gladiators	L 32–69	5–10	Quicken Loans Arena	
18	Friday	July 6	7:00 pm CDT	at Jacksonville Sharks	L 32–50	5–11	Jacksonville Veterans Memorial Arena	
19	Saturday	July 14	7:00 pm CDT	Chicago Rush	L 54–57	5–12	BMO Harris Bradley Center	
20	Sunday	July 22	1:00 pm CDT	at Orlando Predators	L 39–49	5–13	Amway Center	

== Final roster ==
2012 Milwaukee Mustangs roster
Quarterbacks: 7 Shane Boyd; 11 Gino Guidugli; Fullbacks: 24 Nick Torresso; Wide receivers: 15 Jared Jenkins; 3 James Pitts; 20 Taurian Washington; 12 Victor Williams; 6 Jonathan Wilson	Offensive linemen: 88 Thomas Claiborne; 98 Michael Diaz; 50 Raymond McNeil; 70 Anthony Parker; Defensive linemen: 76 Brandon Kirksey; 17 Dwayne LeFall; 44 Justin Lawrence; 36 Luis Vasquez; 90 Quartez Vickerson	Linebackers: 9 Marcus Everett; 10 Tyus Jackson; Defensive backs: 23 Lance Caldwell; 0 Ki'Ameer Johnson; 18 Jamar Love; 21 Christopher Royal; Kickers: 16 Jose Martinez	Injured reserve: 76 William Blackard DL; 12 Dwayne Eley, Jr. WR; 21 Xavier Glenn WR; 19 Ryan McFoy LB; 88 Donald Phelps OL/DL; 74 Adam Tadisch OL; 4 Andrae Thurman WR; 48 Jeff Tow-Arnett FB; Refuse To Report: -- Anthony Gray DL; League suspension: 23 Darnell Burks DB; 94 Ross Cochran LB; 88 Abre Leggins OL/DL; 3 Josue Paul WR; 28 Piere Singfield DB; 28 A. J. Wallace DB; Rookies in italics Roster updated July 20, 2012; 23 Active, 15 Inactive

== Final staff ==
Milwaukee Mustangs staff
Front office: Principles/Owners - Dave Bahl, Todd Hansen, Chris Rebholz; Vice President – Scott Jacka; Chief Operating Officer - Tom Colleton; Director of Media/Public Relations - Nicole LeBlanc; Director of ticket sales – Julie Banach; Director of merchandising/communications – Carlie Kappl; Dance Team Director - Danielle DuFour	Head coaches: Head coach/owner – Bob Landsee; Assistant Head Coach / Director of player personnel – Mark Stoute; Offensive coaches: Wide receivers – Damian Harrell; Defensive coaches: Defensive coordinator – Doug Lytle; Special teams coaches: Special Teams - Damian Harrell
