= 2012 Kansas City Command season =

Arena Football League team season

- Head coach: Danton Barto
- Home stadium: Sprint Center

Results
- Record: 3–15
- Division place: 4th NC Central
- Playoffs: Did not qualify

The 2012 Kansas City Command season was the fifth season for the franchise in the Arena Football League. The team was coached by Danton Barto and played their home games at Sprint Center. The Command finished the season 3–15 and did not qualify for the playoffs. It was announced after the end of the season that the Command would cease operations.

== Standings ==
Central Division
Team	W	L	PCT	PF	PA	DIV	CON	Home	Away
z-San Antonio Talons	14	4	.778	1042	949	5–1	9–4	8–1	6–3
Chicago Rush	10	8	.556	1047	1044	4–2	5–6	7–2	3–6
Iowa Barnstormers	7	11	.389	948	1032	3–3	5–9	4–5	3–6
Kansas City Command	3	15	.167	705	938	0–6	1–12	2–7	1–8

z - Clinched division and conference's best record

== Schedule ==
The Command had a bye week in the league's opening week, so they began their season at home against the Jacksonville Sharks on March 16. They went on the road to play the Arizona Rattlers for their final regular season game on July 21.

Week	Day	Date	Kickoff	Opponent	Results		Location	Report
Week	Day	Date	Kickoff	Opponent	Score	Record	Location	Report
1	Bye							
2	Friday	March 16	7:30 p.m. CDT	Jacksonville Sharks	L 28–52	0–1	Sprint Center	
3	Friday	March 23	6:30 p.m. CDT	at Cleveland Gladiators	L 39–49	0–2	Quicken Loans Arena	
4	Thursday	March 29	7:30 p.m. CDT	Arizona Rattlers	L 28–56	0–3	Sprint Center	
5	Saturday	April 7	7:00 p.m. CDT	at Chicago Rush	L 40–69	0–4	Allstate Arena	
6	Bye							
7	Saturday	April 21	9:30 p.m. CDT	at San Jose SaberCats	L 35–49	0–5	HP Pavilion at San Jose	
8	Monday	April 30	7:00 p.m. CDT	at Tampa Bay Storm	L 46–63	0–6	Tampa Bay Times Forum	
9	Saturday	May 5	7:00 p.m. CDT	San Antonio Talons	L 31–41	0–7	Sprint Center	
10	Saturday	May 12	7:00 p.m. CDT	at Iowa Barnstormers	L 42–62	0–8	Wells Fargo Arena	
11	Saturday	May 19	6:30 p.m. CDT	at Pittsburgh Power	W 43–37	1–8	Consol Energy Center	
12	Saturday	May 26	7:00 p.m. CDT	Georgia Force	W 39–27	2–8	Sprint Center	
13	Saturday	June 2	7:00 p.m. CDT	Utah Blaze	L 45–55	2–9	Sprint Center	
14	Saturday	June 9	9:00 p.m. CDT	at Spokane Shock	L 46–70	2–10	Spokane Veterans Memorial Arena	
15	Sunday	June 17	2:00 p.m. CDT	San Jose SaberCats	W 57–41	3–10	Sprint Center	
16	Saturday	June 23	7:00 p.m. CDT	Chicago Rush	L 41–59	3–11	Sprint Center	
17	Saturday	June 30	7:00 p.m. CDT	at San Antonio Talons	L 48–58	3–12	Alamodome	
18	Saturday	July 7	7:00 p.m. CDT	Iowa Barnstormers	L 27–54	3–13	Sprint Center	
19	Saturday	July 14	7:00 p.m. CDT	Spokane Shock	L 48–49	3–14	Sprint Center	
20	Saturday	July 21	9:00 p.m. CDT	Arizona Rattlers	L 22–47	3–15	US Airways Center	

== Roster ==
Kansas City Command roster
Quarterbacks: 2 Zack Eskridge; 13 Matt Gutierrez; Fullbacks: 44 Lee Bryant; 45 Victor Mann; Wide receivers: 3 Jackie Chambers; 7 Samie Parker; 11 Armand Robinson; 23 O. J. Simpson; 8 Bret Smith	Offensive linemen: 99 Cornelius Dixon; -- Charles Hayes; 54 Kimani Jones; 75 Ken Scott; Defensive linemen: 92 Chris Asumnu; 12 Tommy Chavis; 40 Chris Lyle; 94 Michael Robinson; 48 Rico Reese	Linebackers: 1 Brad Chavez; 26 Tyler Knight; Defensive backs: 21 Rashad Barksdale; 5 Kendall Davis; 9 Sergio Gilliam; 6 J. C. Neal; Kickers: 25 James Wilhoit	Injured reserve: -- Marcus Barnett WR; 75 Robert Brewster OL; 19 Diyral Briggs DL; 81 Keith Eloi WR; 10 Bubby Gill WR; 16 James Lancaster LB; 4 Xavier Lee QB/WR; -- Ernest McCoy OL; 18 James Rogers DB; -- Allen Smith OL; 90 Richard Washington DL; Other league exempt: Currently vacant; Refused to report: -- Ryan Jones DB; -- Jason Jones WR; League suspension: -- Ibrahim Abdulai DL; -- Korey Askew DB; -- Austin Emerson OL; -- Carl Gettis DB; 16 Brian Jones QB; 57 Dan Jones OL/DL; 79 Andre Ramsey OL; 94 Shaun Richardson DL; -- Terrance Sweeney DB; -- Ryan Travis FB; Roster updated July 19, 2012; 24 Active, 23 Inactive
