= 2012 Arizona Rattlers season =

Indoor football season

- Head coach: Kevin Guy
- Home stadium: US Airways Center

Results
- Record: 13–5
- Division place: 1st NC West
- Playoffs: Won Conference Semifinals (SaberCats) 51–48; Won Conference Championship (Blaze) 75–69; Won ArenaBowl XXV (Soul) 72–54

The 2012 Arizona Rattlers season was the 21st season for the franchise in the Arena Football League. The team was coached by Kevin Guy and played their home games at US Airways Center. After winning their third consecutive division championship with a 13–5 record, the Rattlers were able to advance to ArenaBowl XXV, where they defeated the Philadelphia Soul 72–54 to win their third league championship in franchise history.

== Final roster ==
2012 Arizona Rattlers roster
Quarterbacks: 10 Nick Davila; 16 Jason Murrietta; Fullbacks: 32 Odie Armstrong; Wide receivers: 3 Jason Geathers; 2 Maurice Purify; 15 Kerry Reed; 8 Markee White	Offensive linemen: 54 John Booker; 69 Michael Huey; 56 Ronald Jones; 74 SirVincent Rogers; 59 Kyle Young; Defensive linemen: 91 Kyle Cordasco; 6 Cliff Dukes; 77 Anttaj Hawthorne; 70 Marcus Pittman	Linebackers: 94 Tyre Glasper; 20 Kevin McCullough; Defensive backs: 21 Brandon Anderson; 11 Arkeith Brown; 19 Marquis Floyd; 4 Virgil Gray; 24 Kyle Whitehurst; Kickers: 9 Chris Gould	Injured Reserve: 5 Chris Carter WR; -- Sean Creadick WR; 23 Trandon Harvey WR; 44 Bret Manning FB; 29 Da'Mon Merkerson DB; -- Jerell Norton DB; Team Suspended: -- Vince Anderson DB; -- James Hardy WR; -- Greg Mathews WR; Refuse to Report: -- Ailao Eliapo OL; -- Kyle Havens QB; Other League Exempt: -- Ahmad Carroll DB; -- Will Hill DB; Inactive reserve: currently vacant; Recallable reassignment: currently vacant; rookies in italics Roster updated August 8, 2012; 24 Active, 13 Inactive

== Standings ==
West Division
Team	W	L	PCT	PF	PA	DIV	CON	Home	Away
y-Arizona Rattlers	13	5	.722	1118	880	3–3	8–5	7–2	6–3
x-San Jose SaberCats	12	6	.667	1143	1027	4–2	10–4	8–1	4–5
x-Utah Blaze	12	6	.667	1128	1051	4–2	8–4	6–3	6–3
Spokane Shock	10	8	.556	1063	1048	1–5	5–7	5–4	5–4

y - Clinched division
x - Clinched playoff berth

== Schedule ==
=== Regular season ===
The Rattlers began the season on the road against the San Jose SaberCats on March 10. Their first home game was on March 17 when they played the Milwaukee Mustangs. They hosted the Kansas City Command in their final regular season game on July 21.

Week	Day	Date	Kickoff	Opponent	Results		Location	Report
Week	Day	Date	Kickoff	Opponent	Score	Record	Location	Report
1	Saturday	March 10	8:30 p.m. MST	at San Jose SaberCats	L 70–71 (OT)	0–1	HP Pavilion at San Jose	
2	Saturday	March 17	7:00 p.m. MST	Milwaukee Mustangs	W 71–65	1–1	US Airways Center	
3	Bye							
4	Thursday	March 29	5:30 p.m. MST	at Kansas City Command	W 56–28	2–1	Sprint Center	
5	Friday	April 6	7:00 p.m. MST	Spokane Shock	W 57–53	3–1	US Airways Center	
6	Saturday	April 14	5:05 p.m. MST	at Iowa Barnstormers	L 54–56	3–2	Wells Fargo Arena	
7	Sunday	April 22	3:00 p.m. MST	San Antonio Talons	W 68–34	4–2	US Airways Center	
8	Sunday	April 29	Noon MST	at Georgia Force	W 60–27	5–2	Arena at Gwinnett Center	
9	Saturday	May 5	7:00 p.m. MST	San Jose SaberCats	L 70–77	5–3	US Airways Center	
10	Saturday	May 12	7:00 p.m. MST	Chicago Rush	W 77–43	6–3	US Airways Center	
11	Saturday	May 19	6:00 p.m. MST	at Utah Blaze	W 86–70	7–3	EnergySolutions Arena	
12	Saturday	May 26	5:00 p.m. MST	at New Orleans VooDoo	W 69–45	8–3	New Orleans Arena	
13	Saturday	June 2	7:00 p.m. MST	Pittsburgh Power	W 55–45	9–3	US Airways Center	
14	Saturday	June 9	7:00 p.m. MST	Iowa Barnstormers	W 55–48	10–3	US Airways Center	
15	Bye							
16	Friday	June 22	5:00 p.m. MST	at Milwaukee Mustangs	W 52–37	11–3	BMO Harris Bradley Center	
17	Friday	June 29	8:00 p.m. MST	at Spokane Shock	W 61–35	12–3	Spokane Veterans Memorial Arena	
18	Friday	July 6	7:00 p.m. MST	Utah Blaze	L 49–62	12–4	US Airways Center	
19	Saturday	July 14	5:00 p.m. MST	at San Antonio Talons	L 61–62	12–5	Alamodome	
20	Saturday	July 21	7:00 p.m. MST	Kansas City Command	W 47–22	13–5	US Airways Center	

=== Playoffs ===
Round	Day	Date	Kickoff	Opponent	Results	Location	Report
NC Semifinals	Saturday	July 28	7:00 p.m. MST	San Jose SaberCats	W 51–48	US Airways Center	
NC Championship	Saturday	August 4	7:00 p.m. MST	Utah Blaze	W 75–69	US Airways Center	
ArenaBowl XXV	Friday	August 10	7:30 p.m. MST	Philadelphia Soul	W 72–54	New Orleans Arena	
