= 2012 Tampa Bay Storm season =

Arena Football League team season

- Head coach: Dave Ewart
- Home stadium: Tampa Bay Times Forum

Results
- Record: 8–10
- Division place: 4th AC South
- Playoffs: Did not qualify

The 2012 Tampa Bay Storm season was the 25th season for the franchise, and their 21st in the Tampa Bay area. The team was coached by Dave Ewart and played their home games at the Tampa Bay Times Forum. With a final record of 8–10, the Storm missed the playoffs for the second consecutive season. 2012, was the first season in which the Storm used their new logo and uniform colors.

== Standings ==
South Division
| Team | W | L | PCT | PF | PA | DIV | CON | Home | Away |
| y-Jacksonville Sharks | 10 | 8 | .556 | 930 | 884 | 4–4 | 8–6 | 6–4 | 4–4 |
| x-Georgia Force | 9 | 9 | .500 | 812 | 923 | 5–3 | 8–5 | 5–4 | 4–5 |
| x-New Orleans VooDoo | 8 | 10 | .444 | 979 | 995 | 5–3 | 7–5 | 4–5 | 4–5 |
| Tampa Bay Storm | 8 | 10 | .444 | 1021 | 1108 | 4–4 | 7–7 | 7–2 | 1–8 |
| Orlando Predators | 4 | 14 | .222 | 770 | 902 | 2–6 | 4–11 | 4–5 | 0–9 |

y - Clinched division
x - Clinched playoff berth

== Schedule ==
The Storm began the season on the road against the Chicago Rush on March 10. They played the Spokane Shock in their final regular season game on July 21.

| Week | Day | Date | Kickoff | Opponent | Results | | Location | Report |
| Week | Day | Date | Kickoff | Opponent | Score | Record | Location | Report |
|---|---|---|---|---|---|---|---|---|
| 1 | Saturday | March 10 | 8:00 p.m. EST | at Chicago Rush | L 48–70 | 0–1 | Allstate Arena | |
| 2 | Friday | March 16 | 8:00 p.m. EDT | Georgia Force | W 50–47 | 1–1 | Tampa Bay Times Forum | |
| 3 | Bye | | | | | | | |
| 4 | Friday | March 30 | 7:30 p.m. EDT | Jacksonville Sharks | W 71–69 | 2–1 | Tampa Bay Times Forum | |
| 5 | Friday | April 6 | 8:00 p.m. EDT | at New Orleans VooDoo | L 47–66 | 2–2 | New Orleans Arena | |
| 6 | Friday | April 13 | 7:30 p.m. EDT | Cleveland Gladiators | W 69–48 | 3–2 | Tampa Bay Times Forum | |
| 7 | Friday | April 20 | 8:00 p.m. EDT | at Philadelphia Soul | L 48–83 | 3–3 | Wells Fargo Center | |
| 8 | Monday | April 30 | 8:00 p.m. EDT | Kansas City Command | W 63–46 | 4–3 | Tampa Bay Times Forum | |
| 9 | Saturday | May 5 | 7:30 p.m. EDT | Orlando Predators | W 55–31 | 5–3 | Tampa Bay Times Forum | |
| 10 | Saturday | May 12 | 7:00 p.m. EDT | at Georgia Force | L 41–44 | 5–4 | Arena at Gwinnett Center | |
| 11 | Monday | May 21 | 7:30 p.m. EDT | at Cleveland Gladiators | L 34–53 | 5–5 | Quicken Loans Arena | |
| 12 | Saturday | May 26 | 7:30 p.m. EDT | Milwaukee Mustangs | W 63–55 | 6–5 | Tampa Bay Times Forum | |
| 13 | Saturday | June 2 | 7:00 p.m. EDT | at Jacksonville Sharks | L 61–71 | 6–6 | Jacksonville Veterans Memorial Arena | |
| 14 | Bye | | | | | | | |
| 15 | Friday | June 15 | 8:00 p.m. EDT | at Orlando Predators | L 40–64 | 6–7 | Amway Center | |
| 16 | Saturday | June 23 | 7:30 p.m. EDT | San Antonio Talons | L 56–77 | 6–8 | Tampa Bay Times Forum | |
| 17 | Saturday | June 30 | 7:30 p.m. EDT | Philadelphia Soul | L 79–83 | 6–9 | Tampa Bay Times Forum | |
| 18 | Saturday | July 7 | 7:30 p.m. EDT | at Pittsburgh Power | W 65–61 | 7–9 | Consol Energy Center | |
| 19 | Saturday | July 14 | 7:30 p.m. EDT | New Orleans VooDoo | W 78–77 (OT) | 8–9 | Tampa Bay Times Forum | |
| 20 | Saturday | July 21 | 10:00 p.m. EDT | at Spokane Shock | L 53–63 | 8–10 | Spokane Veterans Memorial Arena | |

== Roster ==
2012 Tampa Bay Storm roster
| Quarterbacks: -- Chris Hart; 4 Stephen Wasil; Fullbacks: 44 Terence Crosby; 12 Terrence Royal; Wide receivers: 14 De'Cody Fagg; 5 Jonathan Lowe; 2 Joe Hills; 15 Prechae Rodriguez; 17 Carlos Singleton | Offensive linemen: 68 George Bussey; 75 Tom Kaleita; 67 Brad Serini; Defensive linemen: 54 Paul Griffin; 98 Ko Quaye; 92 Pernell Phillips | Linebackers: 27 Lendy Holmes; 53 Steve Octavien; Defensive backs: 13 Deonte Bolden; 16 Vance Cuff; 31 Roderick Jenrette; 21 Brandon Jones; 18 Martel Moody; 3 Riley Swanson; Kickers: 6 Juan Bongarra | Injury reserve: 17 Nick Hill QB; 11 Amarri Jackson WR; 10 Michael Lindsey WR; 19 Erick McIntosh DB; Refuse to report: Currently vacant; Other League Exempt: Currently vacant; League suspension: 99 Richard Jones DL; 55 Julius Wilson OL; Inactive reserve: Currently vacant; Rookies in italics Roster updated July 21, 2012; 24 Active, 6 Inactive |
