= 2012 San Jose SaberCats season =

Arena Football League team season

- Head coach: Darren Arbet
- Home stadium: HP Pavilion at San Jose

Results
- Record: 12–6
- Division place: 3rd NC West
- Playoffs: Lost Conference Semifinals (Rattlers) 48–51
- Team DPY: Joe Sykes

The 2012 San Jose SaberCats season was the 16th season for the franchise in the Arena Football League. The team was coached by Darren Arbet and played their home games at HP Pavilion at San Jose. After finishing the regular season with a 12–6 record, the SaberCats qualified for the playoffs, but lost in the conference semifinals to the Arizona Rattlers, 48–51.

== Standings ==
West Division
Team	W	L	PCT	PF	PA	DIV	CON	Home	Away
y-Arizona Rattlers	13	5	.722	1118	880	3–3	8–5	7–2	6–3
x-San Jose SaberCats	12	6	.667	1143	1027	4–2	10–4	8–1	4–5
x-Utah Blaze	12	6	.667	1128	1051	4–2	8–4	6–3	6–3
Spokane Shock	10	8	.556	1063	1048	1–5	5–7	5–4	5–4

y - Clinched division
x - Clinched playoff berth

== Schedule ==
=== Regular season ===
The SaberCats began the season at home against the Arizona Rattlers on March 10. They hosted the Iowa Barnstormers on July 14, in their final regular season game.

Week	Day	Date	Kickoff	Opponent	Results		Location	Report
Week	Day	Date	Kickoff	Opponent	Score	Record	Location	Report
1	Saturday	March 10	7:30 p.m. PST	Arizona Rattlers	W 71–70 (OT)	1–0	HP Pavilion at San Jose	
2	Bye							
3	Saturday	March 24	6:00 p.m. PDT	at Utah Blaze	L 59–60	1–1	EnergySolutions Arena	
4	Friday	March 30	5:00 p.m. PDT	at Spokane Shock	W 69–35	2–1	Spokane Veterans Memorial Arena	
5	Friday	April 6	7:30 p.m. PDT	San Antonio Talons	W 76–53	3–1	HP Pavilion at San Jose	
6	Saturday	April 14	3:05 p.m. PDT	at Philadelphia Soul	L 55–61	3–2	Wells Fargo Center	
7	Saturday	April 21	7:30 p.m. PDT	Kansas City Command	W 49–35	4–2	HP Pavilion at San Jose	
8	Saturday	April 28	5:05 p.m. PDT	at Iowa Barnstormers	W 76–33	5–2	Wells Fargo Arena	
9	Saturday	May 5	7:00 p.m. PDT	at Arizona Rattlers	W 77–70	6–2	US Airways Center	
10	Friday	May 11	7:30 p.m. PDT	Utah Blaze	W 70–59	7–2	HP Pavilion at San Jose	
11	Saturday	May 19	5:00 p.m. PDT	at San Antonio Talons	L 47–72	7–3	Alamodome	
12	Saturday	May 26	7:30 p.m. PDT	Chicago Rush	W 84–77 (OT)	8–3	HP Pavilion at San Jose	
13	Saturday	June 2	5:00 p.m. PDT	at Milwaukee Mustangs	L 68–81	8–4	BMO Harris Bradley Center	
14	Friday	June 8	7:30 p.m. PDT	Orlando Predators	W 51–34	9–4	HP Pavilion at San Jose	
15	Sunday	June 17	Noon PDT	at Kansas City Command	L 41–57	9–5	Sprint Center	
16	Saturday	June 23	7:30 p.m. PDT	Spokane Shock	L 63–90	9–6	HP Pavilion at San Jose	
17	Saturday	June 30	5:00 p.m. PDT	at Chicago Rush	W 75–61	10–6	Allstate Arena	
18	Saturday	July 7	7:30 p.m. PDT	New Orleans VooDoo	W 55–31	11–6	HP Pavilion at San Jose	
19	Saturday	July 14	7:30 p.m. PDT	Iowa Barnstormers	W 57–48	12–6	HP Pavilion at San Jose	
20	Bye							

=== Playoffs ===
Round	Day	Date	Kickoff	Opponent	Results	Location	Report
NC Semifinals	Saturday	July 28	7:00 p.m. PDT	at Arizona Rattlers	L 48–51	US Airways Center	

== Final roster ==
2012 San Jose SaberCats roster
Quarterbacks: 16 Mark Grieb; 12 Danny Southwick; Fullbacks: 24 Tommy Taggart; Wide receivers: 4 Hank Edwards; 1 Samora Goodson; 9 James Roe; 17 Huey Whittaker; 15 Fred Williams	Offensive linemen: 70 Emmanuel Akah; 81 Mark Lewis; 68 Robbie Powell; 73 Ako Poti; 72 Isaac Leatiota; Defensive linemen: 8 Tim McGill; 97 Gabe Nyenhuis; 95 Jermaine Smith; 99 Jason Stewart; 10 Joe Sykes	Linebackers: 98 Francis Maka; 20 Tanner Varner; Defensive backs: 13 Mervin Brookins; 5 Andre Jones; 7 LaBrose Hedgemon; Kickers: 3 Nich Pertuit	Injured reserve: 13 Jackie Bates DB; 21 Brandon Brinkley DB; 21 Jameel Dowling DB; 6 Vince Hill DB; 44 Dexter Jackson LB; 89 Taurus Johnson WR; 45 Reagan Maui'a FB; 80 Ben Nelson WR; 11 Rodney Wright WR; League suspension: 7 Chris Boudreaux DB; 98 Francis Maka DL; Recallable reassignment: Currently vacant; Refuse to report: Currently vacant; Other league exempt: 64 Rich Ranglin OL; Inactive Reserve: Currently vacant; Rookies in italics Roster updated July 26, 2012; 23 Active, 12 Inactive
