= Brandon Anderson (American football) =

American football player (born 1985)

No. 21
- Position: Cornerback

Personal information
- Born: December 10, 1985 (age 40); Dublin, Virginia
- Listed height: 5 ft 10 in (1.78 m)
- Listed weight: 179 lb (81 kg)

Career information
- High school: Pulaski County (VA)
- College: Akron
- NFL draft: 2009: undrafted

Career history
- Indianapolis Colts (2009)*; Cleveland Browns (2009)*; Tampa Bay Buccaneers (2009); San Jose SaberCats (2012); Chicago Rush (2013)*; Cleveland Gladiators (2013)
- * Offseason or practice squad member only

Awards and highlights
- ArenaBowl champion (2012)

Career NFL statistics
- Games played: 3
- Stats at Pro Football Reference

Career AFL statistics
- Tackles: 56
- INTs: 2
- Pass deflections: 11
- Stats at ArenaFan.com

Brandon Anderson (born December 10, 1985) is an American former professional football player who was a cornerback in the National Football League (NFL). He was signed by the Indianapolis Colts as an undrafted free agent in 2009. He played college football for the Akron Zips.

Anderson was also a member of the Cleveland Browns and Tampa Bay Buccaneers.

== Early life ==
Anderson attended Pulaski County High School in Dublin, Virginia. While at Pulaski, Anderson played football, basketball and ran track & field. As a member of the football team, Anderson played both running back and defensive back.

After Pulaski, Anderson attended Hargrave Military Academy in Chatham, Virginia.

College recruiting
Name	Hometown	School	Height	Weight	40^{‡}	Commit date
Brandon Anderson; CB	Dublin, Virginia	Hargrave Military Academy	5 ft 11 in (1.80 m)	160 lb (73 kg)	4.4	Dec 26, 2004
Brandon Anderson; CB	Recruit ratings: Scout: Rivals:					
Overall recruit ranking: Scout: -- (CB) Rivals: -- (CB), -- (VA)
Note: In many cases, Scout, Rivals, 247Sports, On3, and ESPN may conflict in their listings of height and weight.; In these cases, the average was taken. ESPN grades are on a 100-point scale.; Sources: "Akron Football Commitment List". Rivals.; "Akron College Football Recruiting Commits". Scout.; "Scout.com Team Recruiting Rankings". Scout.; "2005 Team Ranking". Rivals.com.

Anderson chose to attend the University of Akron, accepting a football scholarship from the Zips on December 26, 2004. Anderson also received scholarship offers from Memphis and Central Florida.

== College career ==
In 2005 as a freshman, Anderson recorded 22 tackles and one interception playing as a special teams player and reserve defensive back In 2006, he returned 11 kickoffs for 157 yards with a long of 28 yards. Recorded 27 tackles and one interception. He also forced a fumble. He recorded 17 tackles and one sack in 2007. His senior year, he returned one kickoff for 17 yards. Had a career high 42 tackles and had one interception. During his college career, he recorded 108 tackles, 1 sack, 1 forced fumble, and 3 interceptions.

== Professional career ==
=== Pre-draft ===
Prior to the 2009 NFL draft, Anderson was projected to be undrafted by NFLDraftScout.com. He was rated as the 79th-best cornerback in the draft. Anderson averaged 4.42 on his 40-yard dash, but ran a 4.34 on his fastest attempt. He was not invited to the NFL Scouting Combine, he posted the following numbers during his Akron pro-day workouts:

Pre-draft measurables
Height	Weight	40-yard dash	10-yard split	20-yard split	Vertical jump	Broad jump
5 ft 10 in (1.78 m)	175 lb (79 kg)	4.42 s	1.54 s	2.53 s	34 in (0.86 m)	10 ft 3 in (3.12 m)
All values from 2009 Akron Pro Day

=== Indianapolis Colts ===
Anderson signed with the Indianapolis Colts after going undrafted.

=== Cleveland Browns ===
Anderson was a practice squad member of the Cleveland Browns in 2009.

=== Tampa Bay Buccaneers ===
Anderson signed with the Tampa Bay Buccaneers in 2009. After a season on the practice squad, the Buccaneers dressed Anderson for 3 games in 2009, where he did not record any statistics.

=== San Jose SaberCats ===
In January 2012, Anderson signed with the San Jose SaberCats of the Arena Football League.

=== Chicago Rush ===
Anderson was assigned to the Chicago Rush for the 2013 season, but was placed on recallable reassignment by the Rush before the season began.

=== Cleveland Gladiators ===
Two days after the Rush placed Anderson on recallable reassignment, he was claimed by the Cleveland Gladiators. Anderson played the 2013 season with the Gladiators. He was reassigned on November 21, 2013.

Anderson now lives at home with his parents and works with youth of Pulaski County in Virginia.
