= 2012 Spokane Shock season =

Arena Football League team season

- Head coach: Andy Olson
- Home stadium: Spokane Veterans Memorial Arena

Results
- Record: 10–8
- Division place: 4th NC West
- Playoffs: Did not qualify

The 2012 Spokane Shock season was the seventh season for the franchise, and the third in the Arena Football League. The team was coached by Andy Olson and played their home games at Spokane Veterans Memorial Arena. The Shock finished the season 10–8, but did not qualify for the playoffs for the first time in their franchise's history.

== Standings ==
West Division
| Team | W | L | PCT | PF | PA | DIV | CON | Home | Away |
| y-Arizona Rattlers | 13 | 5 | .722 | 1118 | 880 | 3–3 | 8–5 | 7–2 | 6–3 |
| x-San Jose SaberCats | 12 | 6 | .667 | 1143 | 1027 | 4–2 | 10–4 | 8–1 | 4–5 |
| x-Utah Blaze | 12 | 6 | .667 | 1128 | 1051 | 4–2 | 8–4 | 6–3 | 6–3 |
| Spokane Shock | 10 | 8 | .556 | 1063 | 1048 | 1–5 | 5–7 | 5–4 | 5–4 |

y - Clinched division
x - Clinched playoff berth

== Schedule ==
The Shock began the season at home against the Iowa Barnstormers on 12 March. They hosted the Tampa Bay Storm in their final regular season game on 21 July.

| Week | Day | Date | Kickoff | Opponent | Results | | Location | Report |
| Week | Day | Date | Kickoff | Opponent | Score | Record | Location | Report |
|---|---|---|---|---|---|---|---|---|
| 1 | Monday | March 12 | 7:00 p.m. PDT | Iowa Barnstormers | L 63–69 (OT) | 0–1 | Spokane Veterans Memorial Arena | |
| 2 | Saturday | March 17 | 5:00 p.m. PDT | at San Antonio Talons | W 63–60 | 1–1 | Alamodome | |
| 3 | Bye | | | | | | | |
| 4 | Friday | March 30 | 5:00 p.m. PDT | San Jose SaberCats | L 35–69 | 1–2 | Spokane Veterans Memorial Arena | |
| 5 | Friday | April 6 | 7:00 p.m. PDT | at Arizona Rattlers | L 53–57 | 1–3 | US Airways Center | |
| 6 | Saturday | April 14 | 7:00 p.m. PDT | Milwaukee Mustangs | W 57–26 | 2–3 | Spokane Veterans Memorial Arena | |
| 7 | Bye | | | | | | | |
| 8 | Saturday | April 28 | 4:00 p.m. PDT | at Jacksonville Sharks | W 56–48 | 3–3 | Jacksonville Veterans Memorial Arena | |
| 9 | Saturday | May 5 | 6:00 p.m. PDT | at Utah Blaze | L 63–84 | 3–4 | EnergySolutions Arena | |
| 10 | Friday | May 11 | 8:00 p.m. PDT | New Orleans VooDoo | W 68–62 (OT) | 4–4 | Spokane Veterans Memorial Arena | |
| 11 | Friday | May 18 | 8:00 p.m. PDT | Philadelphia Soul | W 65–47 | 5–4 | Spokane Veterans Memorial Arena | |
| 12 | Friday | May 25 | 5:05 p.m. PDT | at Iowa Barnstormers | W 68–62 | 6–4 | Wells Fargo Arena | |
| 13 | Saturday | June 2 | 1:00 p.m. PDT | at Chicago Rush | L 62–73 | 6–5 | Allstate Arena | |
| 14 | Saturday | June 9 | 7:00 p.m. PDT | Kansas City Command | W 70–46 | 7–5 | Spokane Veterans Memorial Arena | |
| 15 | Saturday | June 16 | 7:00 p.m. PDT | Utah Blaze | L 55–58 | 7–6 | Spokane Veterans Memorial Arena | |
| 16 | Saturday | June 23 | 7:30 p.m. PDT | at San Jose SaberCats | W 90–63 | 8–6 | HP Pavilion at San Jose | |
| 17 | Friday | June 29 | 8:00 p.m. PDT | Arizona Rattlers | L 35–61 | 8–7 | Spokane Veterans Memorial Arena | |
| 18 | Sunday | July 8 | 3:05 p.m. PDT | at Philadelphia Soul | L 48–62 | 8–8 | Wells Fargo Center | |
| 19 | Saturday | July 14 | 5:00 p.m. PDT | at Kansas City Command | W 49–48 | 9–8 | Sprint Center | |
| 20 | Saturday | July 21 | 7:00 p.m. PDT | Tampa Bay Storm | W 63–53 | 10–8 | Spokane Veterans Memorial Arena | |

== Roster ==
2012 Spokane Shock roster
| Quarterbacks: 12 Jason Boltus; 3 Kyle Rowley; Fullbacks: 45 Andrew Nierman; Wide receivers: 21 Damarlo Belcher; 16 Steven Black; 82 Rod Harper; 17 Adron Tennell | Offensive linemen: 68 Ryan Cave; 55 Chris Pino; 71 Shannon Tevaga; Defensive linemen: 4 Jeremy Geathers; 14 Brandon Rankin; 44 James Ruffin; 94 Marc Schiechl | Linebackers: 11 Micah King; 8 Terence Moore; Defensive backs: 2 Josh Ferguson; 5 Terrance Sanders; 1 Paul Stephens; 23 Patrick Stoudamire; Kickers: 19 Kenny Spencer | Injured Reserve: 40 Mike Alston DL; 29 Beau Bell LB; 13 Justin Ore WR; 77 Palauni Ma'Sun OL; 9 Erik Meyer QB; 91 Chris Tucker DL; -- Samuel Tupua OL; 72 Jonathan Williams DL; League Suspension: -- Charles Frederick WR; Other League Exempt: Currently vacant; Refused to Report: -- Sam Pope DB; Recallable Reassignment: Currently vacant; Rookies in italics Roster updated July 21, 2012; 21 Active, 10 Inactive → More rosters |
