= 2012 New Orleans VooDoo season =

Sports season

- Head coach: Pat O'Hara
- Home stadium: New Orleans Arena

Results
- Record: 8–10
- Division place: 3rd AC South
- Playoffs: Lost Conference Semifinals (Soul) 53–66

The 2012 New Orleans VooDoo season was the sixth season for the franchise in the Arena Football League. The team was coached by Pat O'Hara and played their home games at New Orleans Arena. The VooDoo finished the regular season with a record of 8–10, qualifying for the playoffs for the first time since their inaugural season in 2004. The VooDoo however, were defeated in the conference semifinals by the Philadelphia Soul, 53–66.

== Standings ==
South Division
| Team | W | L | PCT | PF | PA | DIV | CON | Home | Away |
| y-Jacksonville Sharks | 10 | 8 | .556 | 930 | 884 | 4–4 | 8–6 | 6–4 | 4–4 |
| x-Georgia Force | 9 | 9 | .500 | 812 | 923 | 5–3 | 8–5 | 5–4 | 4–5 |
| x-New Orleans VooDoo | 8 | 10 | .444 | 979 | 995 | 5–3 | 7–5 | 4–5 | 4–5 |
| Tampa Bay Storm | 8 | 10 | .444 | 1021 | 1108 | 4–4 | 7–7 | 7–2 | 1–8 |
| Orlando Predators | 4 | 14 | .222 | 770 | 902 | 2–6 | 4–11 | 4–5 | 0–9 |

y - Clinched division
x - Clinched playoff berth

== Schedule ==
=== Regular season ===
The VooDoo had a bye in week 1 and began the season in week 2 at home against the Philadelphia Soul on March 18. They hosted the Georgia Force on July 21 in their final regular season game.

| Week | Day | Date | Kickoff | Opponent | Results | | Location | Report |
| Week | Day | Date | Kickoff | Opponent | Score | Record | Location | Report |
|---|---|---|---|---|---|---|---|---|
| 1 | Bye | | | | | | | |
| 2 | Sunday | March 18 | 3:00 p.m. CDT | Philadelphia Soul | L 62–63 | 0–1 | New Orleans Arena | |
| 3 | Friday | March 23 | 7:00 p.m. CDT | Milwaukee Mustangs | L 42–65 | 0–2 | New Orleans Arena | |
| 4 | Saturday | March 31 | 9:00 p.m. CDT | at Utah Blaze | W 72–56 | 1–2 | EnergySolutions Arena | |
| 5 | Friday | April 6 | 7:00 p.m. CDT | Tampa Bay Storm | W 66–47 | 2–2 | New Orleans Arena | |
| 6 | Friday | April 13 | 7:00 p.m. CDT | at San Antonio Talons | L 48–62 | 2–3 | Alamodome | |
| 7 | Friday | April 20 | 7:00 p.m. CDT | Pittsburgh Power | W 51–48 | 3–3 | New Orleans Arena | |
| 8 | Bye | | | | | | | |
| 9 | Friday | May 4 | 7:00 p.m. CDT | at Jacksonville Sharks | L 37–41 | 3–4 | Jacksonville Veterans Memorial Arena | |
| 10 | Friday | May 11 | 10:00 p.m. CDT | at Spokane Shock | L 62–68 (OT) | 3–5 | Spokane Veterans Memorial Arena | |
| 11 | Friday | May 18 | 7:00 p.m. CDT | Orlando Predators | W 68–61 | 4–5 | New Orleans Arena | |
| 12 | Saturday | May 26 | 7:00 p.m. CDT | Arizona Rattlers | L 45–69 | 4–6 | New Orleans Arena | |
| 13 | Saturday | June 2 | 6:00 p.m. CDT | at Georgia Force | W 57–35 | 5–6 | Arena at Gwinnett Center | |
| 14 | Saturday | June 9 | 7:00 p.m. CDT | San Antonio Talons | L 46–53 | 5–7 | New Orleans Arena | |
| 15 | Saturday | June 16 | 6:30 p.m. CDT | at Cleveland Gladiators | W 54–42 | 6–7 | Quicken Loans Arena | |
| 16 | Saturday | June 23 | 6:30 p.m. CDT | at Orlando Predators | W 48–41 | 7–7 | Amway Center | |
| 17 | Saturday | June 30 | 7:00 p.m. CDT | Jacksonville Sharks | W 65–55 | 8–7 | New Orleans Arena | |
| 18 | Saturday | July 7 | 9:30 p.m. CDT | at San Jose SaberCats | L 31–55 | 8–8 | HP Pavilion at San Jose | |
| 19 | Saturday | July 14 | 6:30 p.m. CDT | at Tampa Bay Storm | L 77–78 (OT) | 8–9 | Tampa Bay Times Forum | |
| 20 | Saturday | July 21 | 7:00 p.m. CDT | Georgia Force | L 48–55 | 8–10 | New Orleans Arena | |

=== Playoffs ===
| Round | Day | Date | Kickoff | Opponent | Results | Location | Report |
|---|---|---|---|---|---|---|---|
| AC Semifinals | Saturday | July 28 | 7:05 p.m. EDT | at Philadelphia Soul | L 53–66 | Wells Fargo Center | |

== Roster ==
2012 New Orleans VooDoo roster
| Quarterbacks: 10 Scott Buisson; 14 Kurt Rocco; 4 Brian Zbydniewski; Fullbacks: 22 Justin Adams; Wide receivers: 28 Josh Bush; 11 L. J. Castile; 2 Chris Duvalt; 15 Quorey Payne; 6 Courtney Smith | Offensive linemen: 77 Patrick Afif; 40 Joe Alajajian; 71 Daverin Geralds; 74 Brad Paul; Defensive linemen: 96 Xavier Brown; 99 Marlon Favorite; 89 Derandus Frye; 3 Robert Henderson; 3 Jonathan Simmons | Linebackers: 17 Alvin Ray Jackson; Defensive backs: 5 Gladel Brutus; 8 Jamaal Fudge; 20 Jeremy Kellem; 1 DeMarcus Robinson; 21 Josh Victorian; Kickers: 22 Gary Cismesia | Injury reserve: 3 Rahim Alem DL; 13 Brian Coulter DL; 72 Adam Durham OL; 9 Michael Janac DL; 13 Brian Johnston LB; 46 Andre Mathis DL; 6 Jasper O'Quinn DB; -- Trevonn Williams OL; 24 Jerron Wishom DB; Other league exempt: 88 Greg Ellingson WR; League suspension: -- George Batiste OL/DL; 74 Mark Fisher OL; 2 Phil Marfuggi K; 95 Lolomana Mikaele DL; 7 Joshua Shene K; Refused to report: -- LaDarius Key DB; -- Micah Rucker WR; -- Mark Thompson OL/DL; Inactive reserve: Currently vacant; Recallable reassignment: Currently vacant; Rookies in italics Roster updated July 26, 2012; 25 Active, 18 Inactive |
