= 2012 Utah Blaze season =

Arena Football League team season

- Head coach: Ron James
- Home stadium: EnergySolutions Arena

Results
- Record: 12–6
- Division place: 3rd NC West
- Playoffs: Won Conference Semifinals (Talons) 35–34; Lost Conference Championship (Rattlers) 69–75
- Team MVP: Tommy Grady
- Team OPY: Tommy Grady

The 2012 Utah Blaze season was the sixth season for the franchise in the Arena Football League. The team was coached by Ron James and played its home games at EnergySolutions Arena for the second straight year. The Blaze finished the regular season 12–6 and qualified for the playoffs. They made it to the National Conference championship game where they played the Arizona Rattlers, but were on the losing end of a 75–69 score.

== Standings ==
West Division
Team	W	L	PCT	PF	PA	DIV	CON	Home	Away
y-Arizona Rattlers	13	5	.722	1118	880	3–3	8–5	7–2	6–3
x-San Jose SaberCats	12	6	.667	1143	1027	4–2	10–4	8–1	4–5
x-Utah Blaze	12	6	.667	1128	1051	4–2	8–4	6–3	6–3
Spokane Shock	10	8	.556	1063	1048	1–5	5–7	5–4	5–4

y - Clinched division
x - Clinched playoff berth

== Schedule ==
=== Regular season ===
The Blaze began the season in San Antonio against the San Antonio Talons on March 10. Their home opener was on March 24 against the San Jose SaberCats. They played the Philadelphia Soul in their final regular season game on July 22.

Week	Day	Date	Kickoff	Opponent	Results		Location	Report
Week	Day	Date	Kickoff	Opponent	Score	Record	Location	Report
1	Saturday	March 10	2:00 p.m. MST	at San Antonio Talons	L 48–54	0–1	Alamodome	
2	Saturday	March 17	6:05 p.m. MDT	at Iowa Barnstormers	W 69–49	1–1	Wells Fargo Arena	
3	Saturday	March 24	7:00 p.m. MDT	San Jose SaberCats	W 60–59	2–1	EnergySolutions Arena	
4	Saturday	March 31	8:00 p.m. MDT	New Orleans VooDoo	L 57–72	2–2	EnergySolutions Arena	
5	Bye							
6	Saturday	April 14	6:00 p.m. MDT	at Jacksonville Sharks	W 75–67	3–2	Jacksonville Veterans Memorial Arena	
7	Friday	April 20	7:00 p.m. MDT	Iowa Barnstormers	W 63–62	4–2	EnergySolutions Arena	
8	Saturday	April 28	6:00 p.m. MDT	at Milwaukee Mustangs	W 61–58	5–2	Bradley Center	
9	Saturday	May 5	7:00 p.m. MDT	Spokane Shock	W 84–63	6–2	EnergySolutions Arena	
10	Friday	May 11	8:30 p.m. MDT	San Jose SaberCats	L 59–70	6–3	HP Pavilion at San Jose	
11	Saturday	May 19	7:00 p.m. MDT	Arizona Rattlers	L 70–86	6–4	EnergySolutions Arena	
12	Saturday	May 26	7:00 p.m. MDT	San Antonio Talons	L 61–64	6–5	EnergySolutions Arena	
13	Saturday	June 2	6:00 p.m. MDT	at Kansas City Command	W 55–45	7–5	Sprint Center	
14	Saturday	June 9	7:00 p.m. MDT	Chicago Rush	W 68–28	8–5	EnergySolutions Arena	
15	Saturday	June 16	8:00 p.m. MDT	Spokane Shock	W 58–55	9–5	Spokane Veterans Memorial Arena	
16	Saturday	June 23	7:00 p.m. MDT	Georgia Force	W 61–38	10–5	EnergySolutions Arena	
17	Bye							
18	Friday	July 6	8:00 p.m. MDT	at Arizona Rattlers	W 62–49	11–5	US Airways Center	
19	Friday	July 13	6:00 p.m. MDT	Cleveland Gladiators	W 83–63	12–5	EnergySolutions Arena	
20	Monday	July 22	4:05 p.m. MDT	at Philadelphia Soul	L 34–69	12–6	Wells Fargo Center	

=== Playoffs ===
Round	Day	Date	Kickoff	Opponent	Results	Location	Report
NC Semifinals	Friday	July 27	6:05 p.m. MST	at San Antonio Talons	W 35–34	Alamodome	
NC Championship	Saturday	August 4	7:00 p.m. MST	at Arizona Rattlers	L 69–75	US Airways Center	

== Final roster ==
2012 Utah Blaze roster
Quarterbacks: 12 Carson Coffman; 10 Tommy Grady; Fullbacks: 43 Ben Stallings; Wide receivers: 21 Shaun Kauleinamoku; 2 Jeremy Kelley; 22 Aaron Lesué; 19 Tysson Poots; 15 Alvance Robinson	Offensive linemen: 69 Antonio Narcisse; 97 Lauvale Sape; 72 Ed Ta'amu; 91 Neal Tivis; Defensive linemen: 35 Jacob Hardwick; 53 Mike Lewis; 57 Keenan Mace; 85 Caesar Rayford	Linebackers: 11 Antwan Marsh; 42 Joe Mortensen; Defensive backs: 1 Carlton Brown; 9 David Hyland; 7 Will Mulder; 4 Alfred Phillips; Kickers: 0 Kyle Brotzman	Injured reserve: 48 Lionel Bibbins DL; 89 Dan DeMaster OL; -- Delric Ellington WR; 73 Darryl Hicks OL; 5 Josh Jones DB; 99 Alex Michael OL; 17 Ernest Pierce WR; 8 Sha'reff Rashad DB; 90 T. J. Raymond OL; 8 Chad Rusinkovich WR; 54 Dain Taylor LB; Other league exempt: Currently vacant; Refuse to report: -- Dominique Johnson WR; Inactive reserve: Currently vacant; League suspension: Currently vacant; Team suspension: -- Neli A'asa DL; 6 Maurice Bryant WR; Recallable reassignment: Currently vacant; Rookies in italics Roster updated August 4, 2012; 23 Active, 14 Inactive
