= Stephen Wasil =

American football player and coach (born 1984)

Albion Britons
- Title: Offensive coordinator & quarterbacks coach

Personal information
- Born: April 14, 1984 (age 42); Redford, Michigan, U.S.
- Listed height: 6 ft 3 in (1.91 m)
- Listed weight: 220 lb (100 kg)

Career information
- Position: Quarterback
- High school: Catholic Central (Detroit)
- College: Albion
- NFL draft: 2006: undrafted

Career history

Playing
- Muskegon Thunder (2007); Texas Copperheads (2008); Albany Firebirds (2009); Alabama Vipers (2010); Arkansas Diamonds (2010); Kansas City Command (2011); Tampa Bay Storm (2012)

Coaching
- Albion (2013–2017) Quarterbacks coach; Albion (2018–present) Offensive coordinator & quarterbacks coach

Awards and highlights
- MIAA Offensive MVP (2005)

Career AFL statistics
- Completions: 414
- Attempts: 684
- Yards: 5,251
- Touchdowns: 99
- Interceptions: 27
- Stats at ArenaFan.com

Stephen "Steve" Wasil (born April 14, 1984) is an American college football coach and former arena football quarterback. He is the offensive coordinator and quarterbacks coach for Albion College, positions he has held since 2018. He played for the Muskegon Thunder, Texas Copperheads, Albany Firebirds, Alabama Vipers, Kansas City Command and Tampa Bay Storm. He is currently the offensive coordinator at Albion College.

== College career ==
Wasil attended Albion College, where he was a member of the football team. He still holds the records for all-time most passing yards in a game (412), most passing yards in a season (3313), and most touchdowns in a season (33). In 2005, he led the Britons to a Michigan Intercollegiate Athletic Association Championship and was named the league's Most Valuable Offensive Player.

== Professional career ==
In 2007, Wasil began playing professionally for the Muskegon Thunder of the Continental Indoor Football League. He led the Thunder to a 4–8 record, but they lost the qualifying game to officially make the playoffs. He was named team MVP.

In 2008, Wasil moved up to af2 as member of the Texas Copperheads. He played in eight games for the 2–14 Copperheads, completing 122-of-264 attempts for 1,205 yards (49 long), 15 touchdowns, 11 interceptions and rushed 12 times for 41 yards and 1 touchdown.

In 2009, Wasil was again in af2 as member of the Albany Firebirds. The team went 7–5 with Wasil as the starter. The team sputtered with Wasil on the injured reserve list, going 0–4, and failing to qualify for the playoffs.

In 2010, Wasil finally made it to the Arena Football League as member of the Alabama Vipers. He was the backup quarterback for the season behind Kevin Eakin. He started in place of Eakin in Week 7 against the Orlando Predators, throwing for 200 yards and two touchdowns.

In 2011, Wasil signed with the Kansas City Command. He took over as the Command starting quarterback in June, and threw 26 touchdowns and 1,385 yards. He re-signed with the Command for the 2012 season, but was later traded to the Tampa Bay Storm in exchange for 2011 Game Tape Exchange Defensive Lineman of the Year, Clifford Dukes.

Wasil played the 2012 season with the Storm, leading them to an 8–10 record, failing to make it to the playoffs, but it was Wasil's most impressive season as a professional, throwing 71 touchdowns and 3,666 yards.

=== AFL statistics ===
Year	Team	Passing							Rushing		
Year	Team	Cmp	Att	Pct	Yds	TD	Int	Rtg	Att	Yds	TD
2010	Alabama	14	27	51.9	200	2	2	63.81	4	17	1
2011	Kansas City	106	168	63.1	1,385	26	8	107.86	12	26	3
2012	Tampa Bay	294	489	60.1	3,666	71	17	105.24	64	136	19
Career		414	684	60.5	5,251	99	27	104.25	80	179	23

== Coaching career ==
Wasil retired from the AFL in 2013, after initially re-signing with the Storm. Wasil announced that he would be starting his coaching career as the quarterbacks coach for his alma mater, Albion College.
