= 2012 Jacksonville Sharks season =

Franchisee in the Arena Football League in 2012

- Head coach: Les Moss
- Home stadium: Jacksonville Veterans Memorial Arena

Results
- Record: 10–8
- Division place: 1st AC South
- Playoffs: Won Conference Semifinals (Force) 58–56; Lost Conference Championship (Soul) 34–89

The 2012 Jacksonville Sharks season was the third season for the franchise in the Arena Football League (AFL), coming off of their victory in ArenaBowl XXIV. The team was coached by Les Moss and played their home games at Jacksonville Veterans Memorial Arena. With a 10–8 record in the regular season, the Sharks won their third consecutive division championship. However, they were denied an opportunity at an ArenaBowl championship repeat when they were defeated 89–34 in the American Conference Championship game by the Philadelphia Soul.

== Standings ==
South Division
Team	W	L	PCT	PF	PA	DIV	CON	Home	Away
y-Jacksonville Sharks	10	8	.556	930	884	4–4	8–6	6–4	4–4
x-Georgia Force	9	9	.500	812	923	5–3	8–5	5–4	4–5
x-New Orleans VooDoo	8	10	.444	979	995	5–3	7–5	4–5	4–5
Tampa Bay Storm	8	10	.444	1021	1108	4–4	7–7	7–2	1–8
Orlando Predators	4	14	.222	770	902	2–6	4–11	4–5	0–9

y - Clinched division
x - Clinched playoff berth

== Schedule ==
=== Regular season ===
The Sharks had a bye week in week 1 and began the season on the road in week 2 against the Kansas City Command on March 16. Their first home game was on March 24 against the Georgia Force. They traveled to Pittsburgh to face the Pittsburgh Power on July 20 in their final regular season game.

Week	Day	Date	Kickoff	Opponent	Results		Location	Report
Week	Day	Date	Kickoff	Opponent	Score	Record	Location	Report
1	Bye							
2	Friday	March 16	8:30 p.m. EDT	at Kansas City Command	W 52–28	1–0	Sprint Center	
3	Saturday	March 24	7:00 p.m. EDT	Georgia Force	L 41–69	1–1	Jacksonville Veterans Memorial Arena	
4	Friday	March 30	7:30 p.m. EDT	at Tampa Bay Storm	L 69–71	1–2	Tampa Bay Times Forum	
5	Bye							
6	Friday	April 13	8:00 p.m. EDT	Utah Blaze	L 67–75	1–3	Jacksonville Veterans Memorial Arena	
7	Saturday	April 21	7:30 p.m. EDT	at Cleveland Gladiators	W 54–49	2–3	Quicken Loans Arena	
8	Saturday	April 28	7:00 p.m. EDT	Spokane Shock	L 48–56	2–4	Jacksonville Veterans Memorial Arena	
9	Friday	May 4	8:00 p.m. EDT	New Orleans VooDoo	W 41–37	3–4	Jacksonville Veterans Memorial Arena	
10	Saturday	May 12	7:05 p.m. EDT	at Philadelphia Soul	W 38–56	3–5	Wells Fargo Center	
11	Saturday	May 19	7:00 p.m. EDT	Iowa Barnstormers	W 55–19	4–5	Jacksonville Veterans Memorial Arena	
12	Friday	May 25	8:00 p.m. EDT	at Orlando Predators	W 55–37	5–5	Amway Center	
13	Saturday	June 2	7:00 p.m. EDT	Tampa Bay Storm	W 71–61	6–5	Jacksonville Veterans Memorial Arena	
14	Saturday	June 9	7:00 p.m. EDT	at Georgia Force	L 39–56	6–6	Arena at Gwinnett Center	
15	Saturday	June 16	7:00 p.m. EDT	Philadelphia Soul	L 27–62	6–7	Jacksonville Veterans Memorial Arena	
16	Saturday	June 23	7:00 p.m. EDT	Cleveland Gladiators	W 56–42	7–7	Jacksonville Veterans Memorial Arena	
17	Saturday	June 30	8:00 p.m. EDT	at New Orleans VooDoo	L 55–65	7–8	New Orleans Arena	
18	Friday	July 6	8:00 p.m. EDT	Milwaukee Mustangs	W 50–32	8–8	Jacksonville Veterans Memorial Arena	
19	Saturday	July 14	7:00 p.m. EDT	Orlando Predators	W 48–30	9–8	Jacksonville Veterans Memorial Arena	
20	Friday	July 20	8:00 p.m. EDT	at Pittsburgh Power	W 64–39	10–8	Consol Energy Center	

=== Playoffs ===
Round	Day	Date	Kickoff	Opponent	Results	Location	Report
AC Semifinals	Saturday	July 28	7:00 p.m. EDT	Georgia Force	W 58–56	Jacksonville Veterans Memorial Arena	
AC Championship	Friday	August 3	8:00 p.m. EDT	at Philadelphia Soul	L 34–89	Wells Fargo Center	
