= Xavier Brown =

American gridiron football player (born 1988)

No. 96
- Position: Defensive end

Personal information
- Born: February 19, 1988 (age 38)
- Listed height: 6 ft 4 in (1.93 m)
- Listed weight: 265 lb (120 kg)

Career information
- College: C.W. Post
- NFL draft: 2011: undrafted

Career history
- Hamilton Tiger-Cats (2011)*; Chicago Rush (2012); New Orleans VooDoo (2012–2015); Philadelphia Eagles (2012)*
- * Offseason or practice squad member only

Career AFL statistics
- Tackles: 56
- Sacks: 15.5
- Blocked kicks: 4
- Stats at ArenaFan.com

Xavier Brown (born February 19, 1988) is an American football defensive end. He played college football for C. W. Post, he was signed by the Hamilton Tiger-Cats of the Canadian Football League (CFL) as an undrafted free agent in 2011. He then played for the Chicago Rush and New Orleans VooDoo of the Arena Football League (AFL) from 2012 to 2014.

== Professional career ==
=== Canadian Football League ===
Brown was signed by the Hamilton Tiger-Cats on June 6, 2011. He was released during final roster cuts on June 25, 2011.

=== Arena Football League ===
Brown was assigned to the Chicago Rush of the Arena Football League in February 2012. On May 28, 2012, he was traded to the New Orleans VooDoo for cornerback Leslie Majors.

=== National Football League ===
Brown was signed by the Philadelphia Eagles on August 4, 2012.
