= 2012 Orlando Predators season =

Arena Football League team season

- Head coach: Bret Munsey
- Home stadium: Amway Center

Results
- Record: 4–14
- Division place: 5th AC South
- Playoffs: Did not qualify

The 2012 Orlando Predators season was the 21st season for the franchise in the Arena Football League. The team was coached by Bret Munsey and played their home games at Amway Center. Finishing with a 4–14 record, the Predators missed the playoffs for the first time since their inaugural season in 1991, snapping a streak of 19 consecutive playoff appearances.

== Standings ==
South Division
Team	W	L	PCT	PF	PA	DIV	CON	Home	Away
y-Jacksonville Sharks	10	8	.556	930	884	4–4	8–6	6–4	4–4
x-Georgia Force	9	9	.500	812	923	5–3	8–5	5–4	4–5
x-New Orleans VooDoo	8	10	.444	979	995	5–3	7–5	4–5	4–5
Tampa Bay Storm	8	10	.444	1021	1108	4–4	7–7	7–2	1–8
Orlando Predators	4	14	.222	770	902	2–6	4–11	4–5	0–9

y - Clinched division
x - Clinched playoff berth

== Schedule ==
The Predators began the season at home against the Pittsburgh Power on March 9. They hosted the Milwaukee Mustangs in their final regular season game on July 22.

Week	Day	Date	Kickoff	Opponent	Results		Location	Report
Week	Day	Date	Kickoff	Opponent	Score	Record	Location	Report
1	Friday	March 9	8:30 p.m. EST	Pittsburgh Power	L 26–40	0–1	Amway Center	
2	Bye							
3	Thursday	March 22	8:30 p.m. EDT	at Chicago Rush	L 49–51	0–2	Allstate Arena	
4	Saturday	March 31	7:30 p.m. EDT	San Antonio Talons	L 34–47	0–3	Amway Center	
5	Sunday	April 8	6:00 p.m. EDT	at Cleveland Gladiators	L 24–41	0–4	Quicken Loans Arena	
6	Saturday	April 14	7:30 p.m. EDT	at Pittsburgh Power	L 54–57 (OT)	0–5	Consol Energy Center	
7	Friday	April 20	7:30 p.m. EDT	Georgia Force	W 27–24	1–5	Amway Center	
8	Saturday	April 28	7:30 p.m. EDT	Philadelphia Soul	L 53–69	1–6	Amway Center	
9	Saturday	May 5	7:30 p.m. EDT	at Tampa Bay Storm	L 31–55	1–7	Tampa Bay Times Forum	
10	Bye							
11	Friday	May 18	8:00 p.m. EDT	at New Orleans VooDoo	L 61–68	1–8	New Orleans Arena	
12	Friday	May 25	8:00 p.m. EDT	Jacksonville Sharks	L 37–55	1–9	Amway Center	
13	Saturday	June 2	7:05 p.m. EDT	at Philadelphia Soul	L 48–79	1–10	Wells Fargo Center	
14	Friday	June 8	10:30 p.m. EDT	San Jose SaberCats	L 34–51	1–11	HP Pavilion at San Jose	
15	Friday	June 15	8:00 p.m. EDT	Tampa Bay Storm	W 64–40	2–11	Amway Center	
16	Saturday	June 23	7:30 p.m. EDT	New Orleans VooDoo	L 48–41	2–12	Amway Center	
17	Sunday	July 1	3:00 p.m. EDT	at Georgia Force	L 53–56	2–13	Arena at Gwinnett Center	
18	Friday	July 6	7:30 p.m. EDT	Cleveland Gladiators	W 55–34	3–13	Amway Center	
19	Saturday	July 14	7:00 p.m. EDT	at Jacksonville Sharks	L 30–48	3–14	Jacksonville Veterans Memorial Arena	
20	Sunday	July 22	2:00 p.m. EDT	Milwaukee Mustangs	W 49–39	4–14	Amway Center	

Gray indicates that the game was played with replacement players because of the players' strike.

== Final roster ==
2012 Orlando Predators roster
Quarterbacks: 8 Matt Grothe; 12 Chris Leak; Fullbacks: 22 Mykel Benson; Wide receivers: 16 Glen Fox; 17 T. T. Toliver; 11 Jarvis Williams	Offensive linemen: 77 Thaddeus Coleman; 50 Paul Fenaroli; 65 Chris Jamison; 70 Trevis Turner; Defensive linemen: 23 Terrance Carter; 33 J. T. Gilmore; 61 Jimmy Saddler-McQueen; 91 Jason Peters	Linebackers: 9 Marlon Moye-Moore; 44 Mark Robinson; Defensive backs: 21 Simeon Castile; 2 Travis Coleman; 6 Darron Edwards; 15 Erick Harris; 28 Kenny McEntyre; Kickers: 18 Mark Lewis	Injured reserve: 63 Richard Clebert DL; Other league exempt list: Currently vacant; League suspension: -- Randy Lowery WR; -- Joe Marshall DL; Inactive reserve: Currently vacant; Recallable reassignment: Currently vacant; Rookies in italics Roster updated July 22, 2012; 22 Active, 3 Inactive
