= 2012 Chicago Rush season =

Arena Football League team season

- Owner: Arena Football League
- Head coach: Bob McMillen
- Home stadium: Allstate Arena

Results
- Record: 10–8
- Division place: 2nd NC Central
- Playoffs: Did not qualify

The 2012 Chicago Rush season was the 11th season for the franchise in the Arena Football League. The team was coached by Bob McMillen and played their home games at Allstate Arena. The Rush finished the season 10–8 and missed the playoffs for the first time in franchise history.

== Standings ==
Central Division
Team	W	L	PCT	PF	PA	DIV	CON	Home	Away
z-San Antonio Talons	14	4	.778	1042	949	5–1	9–4	8–1	6–3
Chicago Rush	10	8	.556	1047	1044	4–2	5–6	7–2	3–6
Iowa Barnstormers	7	11	.389	948	1032	3–3	5–9	4–5	3–6
Kansas City Command	3	15	.167	705	938	0–6	1–12	2–7	1–8

z - Clinched division and conference's best record

== Schedule ==
The Rush began the season at home against the Tampa Bay Storm on March 10. Their regular season concluded on July 21 on the road against the Cleveland Gladiators. Chicago was eliminated from playoff contention with its 61â€“54 home loss to the San Antonio Talons on July 8; the Daily Herald reported that it was the first time in the franchise's 11-year history that the Rush missed the postseason.

Week	Day	Date	Kickoff	Opponent	Results		Location	Report
Week	Day	Date	Kickoff	Opponent	Score	Record	Location	Report
1	Saturday	March 10	7:00 p.m. CST	Tampa Bay Storm	W 70–48	1–0	Allstate Arena	
2	Bye							
3	Thursday	March 22	7:30 p.m. CDT	Orlando Predators	W 51–49	2–0	Allstate Arena	
4	Saturday	March 31	7:05 p.m. CDT	at Iowa Barnstormers	W 62–61 (OT)	3–0	Wells Fargo Arena	
5	Saturday	April 7	7:00 p.m. CDT	Kansas City Command	W 69–40	4–0	Allstate Arena	
6	Saturday	April 14	6:00 p.m. CDT	at Georgia Force	L 49–70	4–1	Arena at Gwinnett Center	
7	Saturday	April 21	7:00 p.m. CDT	Milwaukee Mustangs	W 62–61	5–1	Allstate Arena	
8	Saturday	April 28	2:30 p.m. CDT	at San Antonio Talons	L 55–56	5–2	Alamodome	
9	Sunday	May 6	3:00 p.m. CDT	Iowa Barnstormers	W 61–50	6–2	Allstate Arena	
10	Saturday	May 12	9:00 p.m. CDT	at Arizona Rattlers	L 43–77	6–3	US Airways Center	
11	Bye							
12	Saturday	May 26	9:30 p.m. CDT	at San Jose SaberCats	L 77–84 (OT)	6–4	HP Pavilion at San Jose	
13	Sunday	June 3	3:00 p.m. CDT	Spokane Shock	W 73–62	7–4	Allstate Arena	
14	Saturday	June 9	9:00 p.m. CDT	Utah Blaze	L 28–68	7–5	EnergySolutions Arena	
15	Saturday	June 16	7:00 p.m. CDT	Georgia Force	W 62–27	8–5	Allstate ARena	
16	Saturday	June 23	7:00 p.m. CDT	at Kansas City Command	W 59–41	9–5	Sprint Center	
17	Saturday	June 30	7:00 p.m. CDT	San Jose SaberCats	L 61–75	9–6	Allstate Arena	
18	Sunday	July 8	3:00 p.m. CDT	San Antonio Talons	L 54–61	9–7	Allstate Arena	
19	Saturday	July 14	7:00 p.m. CDT	at Milwaukee Mustangs	W 57–54	10–7	BMO Harris Bradley Center	
20	Saturday	July 21	6:30 p.m. CDT	at Cleveland Gladiators	L 54–60	10–8	Quicken Loans Arena	

== Final roster ==
2012 Chicago Rush roster
Quarterbacks: 7 Luke Drone; Fullbacks: 43 J. J. Payne; Wide receivers: 1 Reggie Gray; 16 Marquis Hamilton; 6 Jared Perry; 2 Terrance Turner	Offensive linemen: 70 C. J. Cobb; 51 Billy Eisenhardt; -- Joe Gibbs; 73 T. J. Watkins; Defensive linemen: 91 Broderick Binns; 92 Darrell Campbell; 17 Jermaine McGhee; 5 Broderick Stewart	Linebackers: 10 Russell Monk; 37 Kelvin Morris; Defensive backs: 14 Jorrick Calvin; 18 Boubacar Cissoko; 22 Semaj Moody; Kickers: 25 Joe Houston	Injured Reserve: 4 Vic Hall DB; 75 Colin Madison OL; 12 Russ Michna QB; Refuse to report: 5 Reggie Sullivan DB; League suspension: 56 Nekos Brown LB; 21 Kelvyn Hemphill DB; 93 Cedric McKinney OL/DL; 9 Jerell Norton DB; -- Jack Williams DB; Other league exempt: 90 Derek Walker DL; Rookies in italics Roster updated July 21, 2012; 19 Active, 10 Inactive
