= 2012 Cleveland Gladiators season =

Arena Football League team season

- Head coach: Steve Thonn
- Home stadium: Quicken Loans Arena

Results
- Record: 8–10
- Division place: 2nd AC East
- Playoffs: Did not qualify

The 2012 Cleveland Gladiators season was the 13th season for the franchise in the Arena Football League, and the fourth while in Cleveland. The team was coached by Steve Thonn and played their home games at Quicken Loans Arena. The Gladiators finished the season with an 8–10 record and did not qualify for the playoffs. In this season, the Gladiators became the first team in the history of the league to forfeit a game. They did so on June 8 when the players went on strike prior to a matchup against the Pittsburgh Power in week 14.

== Standings ==
East Division
Team	W	L	PCT	PF	PA	DIV	CON	Home	Away
z-Philadelphia Soul	15	3	.833	1228	919	4–2	12–2	7–2	8–1
Cleveland Gladiators	8	10	.444	879	875	4–2	6–8	5–4	3–6
Milwaukee Mustangs	5	13	.278	960	1062	3–3	4–7	2–6	3–7
Pittsburgh Power	5	13	.278	827	963	1–5	4–9	1–8	4–5

z - Clinched division and conference's best record

== Schedule ==
The Gladiators began the season on the road against the Georgia Force on March 12. Their first home game was on March 26 against the Kansas City Command. They hosted the Chicago Rush on July 21 in their final regular season game.

Week	Day	Date	Kickoff	Opponent	Results		Location	Report
Week	Day	Date	Kickoff	Opponent	Score	Record	Location	Report
1	Monday	March 12	7:30 p.m. EDT	at Georgia Force	L 39–41	0–1	Arena at Gwinnett Center	
2	Bye							
3	Friday	March 23	7:30 p.m. EDT	Kansas City Command	W 49–39	1–1	Quicken Loans Arena	
4	Sunday	April 1	6:05 p.m. EDT	Philadelphia Soul	W 68–62	2–1	Wells Fargo Center	
5	Sunday	April 8	6:00 p.m. EDT	Orlando Predators	W 41–24	3–1	Quicken Loans Arena	
6	Friday	April 13	7:30 p.m. EDT	at Tampa Bay Storm	L 48–69	3–2	Tampa Bay Times Forum	
7	Saturday	April 21	7:30 p.m. EDT	Jacksonville Sharks	L 49–54	3–3	Quicken Loans Arena	
8	Saturday	April 28	7:30 p.m. EDT	at Pittsburgh Power	W 58–43	4–3	Consol Energy Center	
9	Bye							
10	Friday	May 11	8:00 p.m. EDT	at Milwaukee Mustangs	W 69–48	5–3	Bradley Center	
11	Monday	May 21	7:30 p.m. EDT	Tampa Bay Storm	W 53–34	6–3	Quicken Loans Arena	
12	Sunday	May 27	4:00 p.m. EDT	Philadelphia Soul	L 33–55	6–4	Quicken Loans Arena	
13	Friday	June 1	8:00 p.m. EDT	at Iowa Barnstormers	L 62–70	6–5	Wells Fargo Arena	
14	Friday	June 8	8:00 p.m. EDT	Pittsburgh Power	L 0–2^{[a]}	6–6	Quicken Loans Arena	
15	Saturday	June 16	7:30 p.m. EDT	New Orleans VooDoo	L 42–54	6–7	Quicken Loans Arena	
16	Saturday	June 23	7:00 p.m. EDT	at Jacksonville Sharks	L 42–56	6–8	Jacksonville Veterans Memorial Arena	
17	Friday	June 29	8:00 p.m. EDT	Milwaukee Mustangs	W 69–32	7–8	Quicken Loans Arena	
18	Friday	July 6	7:30 p.m. EDT	at Orlando Predators	L 34–55	7–9	Amway Center	
19	Friday	July 13	8:00 p.m. EDT	at Utah Blaze	L 63–83	7–10	EnergySolutions Arena	
20	Saturday	July 21	4:00 p.m. EDT	Chicago Rush	W 60–54	8–10	Quicken Loans Arena	

- ^{a} Due to a players' strike within the team, the Gladiators were unable to field enough players, and forfeited the game.

== Final roster ==
2012 Cleveland Gladiators roster
Quarterbacks: 10 Matt Bassuener; 8 John Dutton; Fullbacks: 55 Derik Steiner; Wide receivers: 2 Carlese Franklin; 16 Dominick Goodman; 1 Robert Redd; 17 Maurice Williams	Offensive linemen: 90 Nyere Aumaitre; 74 Eric Davis; 79 Ron Haver; 66 Jeff Maddux; 71 Michael Ward; Defensive linemen: 33 Brian Brikowski; 91 Prentice Purnell; 44 Jeramie Richardson	Linebackers: 49 Tim Cheatwood; 14 Denayne Dixon; Defensive backs: 5 Dustin Bell; 3 Levy Brown; 21 Dominic Jones; 20 Joe Phinisee; 9 Lenny Wicks; Kickers: 11 Carlos Ojeda	Injury reserve: Currently vacant; Other league exempt: Currently vacant; Refused to report: Currently vacant; League suspension: Currently vacant; Inactive reserve: Currently vacant; Recallable reassignment: Currently vacant; Rookies in italics Roster Archived 2015-02-15 at the Wayback Machine updated July 21, 2012; 22 Active, 0 Inactive
