= Ibrahim Abdulai =

American football player (born 1988)

Profile
- Position: Defensive tackle

Personal information
- Born: September 5, 1988 (age 38)
- Listed height: 6 ft 2 in (1.88 m)
- Listed weight: 305 lb (138 kg)

Career information
- College: Arkansas–Pine Bluff
- NFL draft: 2011: undrafted

Career history
- New York Giants (2011)*; Kansas City Command (2012)
- * Offseason or practice squad member only
- Stats at Pro Football Reference
- Stats at ArenaFan.com

Heero ibrahim Abdulai (born September 5, 1988) is an American football defensive tackle who attended college at Arkansas-Pine Bluff. He was undrafted in 2011 and signed with the New York Giants. In 2012, he was a member of the Kansas City Command of the Arena Football League.

After his short bid in the NFL, Abdulai went back to school and became a Pulmonary Transplant Specialist.

As of July 2023, Abdulai streams on Twitch under the pseudonym "codingwithstrangers", where he teaches himself Python in collaboration with a live audience.
