= 2012 San Antonio Talons season =

Arena Football League team season

- Head coach: Lee Johnson
- Home stadium: Alamodome

Results
- Record: 14–4
- Division place: 1st NC Central
- Playoffs: Lost Conference Semifinals (Blaze) 34–35

The 2012 San Antonio Talons season was the 12th season for the franchise, and the third in the Arena Football League. This was the first season for the Talons in San Antonio, Texas, after relocating from Tulsa, Oklahoma, following the 2011 season. The team was coached by Lee Johnson and played their home games at the Alamodome. The Talons finished the regular season with a 14–4 record, winning the Central Division and securing the top seed in the National Conference. However, the Talons would lose at home by one point in the conference semifinals to the Utah Blaze, 34–35.

== Standings ==
Central Division
Team	W	L	PCT	PF	PA	DIV	CON	Home	Away
z-San Antonio Talons	14	4	.778	1042	949	5–1	9–4	8–1	6–3
Chicago Rush	10	8	.556	1047	1044	4–2	5–6	7–2	3–6
Iowa Barnstormers	7	11	.389	948	1032	3–3	5–9	4–5	3–6
Kansas City Command	3	15	.167	705	938	0–6	1–12	2–7	1–8

z - Clinched division and conference's best record

== Schedule ==
=== Regular season ===
The Talons began the season at home against the Utah Blaze on March 10. They went on the road to play the Iowa Barnstormers on July 21 in their final regular season game.

Week	Day	Date	Kickoff	Opponent	Results		Location	Report
Week	Day	Date	Kickoff	Opponent	Score	Record	Location	Report
1	Saturday	March 10	3:00 p.m. CST	Utah Blaze	W 54–48	1–0	Alamodome	
2	Saturday	March 17	7:00 p.m. CDT	Spokane Shock	L 60–63	1–1	Alamodome	
3	Bye							
4	Thursday	March 29	6:30 p.m. CDT	at Orlando Predators	W 47–34	2–1	Amway Center	
5	Friday	April 6	9:30 p.m. CDT	at San Jose SaberCats	L 53–76	2–2	HP Pavilion at San Jose	
6	Friday	April 13	7:00 p.m. CDT	New Orleans VooDoo	W 62–48	3–2	Alamodome	
7	Sunday	April 22	5:00 p.m. CDT	at Arizona Rattlers	L 34–68	3–3	US Airways Center	
8	Saturday	April 28	2:30 p.m. CDT	Chicago Rush	W 56–55	4–3	Alamodome	
9	Saturday	May 5	7:00 p.m. CDT	at Kansas City Command	W 41–31	5–3	Sprint Center	
10	Saturday	May 12	7:00 p.m. CDT	Pittsburgh Power	W 68–52	6–3	Alamodome	
11	Saturday	May 19	7:00 p.m. CDT	San Jose SaberCats	W 72–47	7–3	Alamodome	
12	Saturday	May 26	8:00 p.m. CDT	at Utah Blaze	W 64–61	8–3	EnergySolutions Arena	
13	Bye							
14	Saturday	June 9	7:00 p.m. CDT	at New Orleans VooDoo	W 53–46	9–3	New Orleans Arena	
15	Saturday	June 16	7:00 p.m. CDT	Iowa Barnstormers	W 57–35	10–3	Alamodome	
16	Saturday	June 23	6:30 p.m. CDT	at Tampa Bay Storm	W 77–56	11–3	Tampa Bay Times Forum	
17	Saturday	June 30	7:00 p.m. CDT	Kansas City Command	W 58–48	12–3	Alamodome	
18	Sunday	July 8	3:00 p.m. CDT	at Chicago Rush	W 61–54	13–3	Allstate Arena	
19	Saturday	July 14	7:00 p.m. CDT	Arizona Rattlers	W 62–61	14–3	Alamodome	
20	Saturday	July 21	7:05 p.m. CDT	at Iowa Barnstormers	L 63–66	14–4	Wells Fargo Arena	

=== Playoffs ===
Round	Day	Date	Kickoff	Opponent	Results	Location	Report
NC Semifinals	Friday	July 27	7:00 p.m. CDT	Utah Blaze	L 34–35	Alamodome	

== Final roster ==
2012 San Antonio Talons roster
Quarterbacks: 8 Aaron Garcia; 14 Steven Sheffield; Fullbacks: 28 Chad Cook; 17 Wesley Mauia; Wide receivers: 19 Sale Key; 25 Derek Lee; 11 D. J. Stephens; 81 Burl Toler III; 7 Jason Willis; 15 Jomo Wilson	Offensive linemen: -- Edward Jackson; 64 Ray Hisatake; -- Devin Livingston; 90 Ty Nsekhe; -- Albert Stinson; Defensive linemen: 42 Victor DeGrate; -- Mike Landry; -- Duke Pettijohn; 99 Jamar Ward; 33 Mark Weivoda; 22 Jon Williams	Linebackers: 44 Jamar Ransom; 3 Leslie Turner; Defensive backs: 2 Eric Crocker; 4 Ken Fontenette; 24 Dwight McLean; -- Will Poole; -- Kelvin Rodgers; 6 Fred Shaw; -- Darien Williams; Kickers: 13 Stefan Demos	Injured reserve: 56 Tray Allen OL; 10 Brent Holmes WR; 5 Maurice Holmes DB; 1 Carl Moore WR; 82 Robert Quiroga WR; -- Cody Savage OL; 55 Simi Toeaina OL/DL; 16 Gus Tyson DB/LB; Refuse to report: -- Van Nelson OL; Other league exempt: 9 Jerry Brown DL; Suspended list: 75 Atlas Herrion OL; 92 Jake Killeen DL; -- Brian Logan DB; -- Kendall Riley FB; 69 Jonas Seawright DL; 74 Derik Stotland OL; -- Petey Westmoreland LB; Rookies in italics Roster updated July 26, 2012; 31 Active, 17 Inactive → More rosters
