= 2012 Philadelphia Soul season =

Arena Football League team season

- Head coach: Doug Plank
- Home stadium: Wells Fargo Center

Results
- Record: 15–3
- Division place: 1st AC East
- Playoffs: Won Conference Semifinal (VooDoo) 66–53; Won Conference Championship (Sharks) 89–34; Lost ArenaBowl XXV (Rattlers) 54–72

The 2012 Philadelphia Soul season was the seventh season for the franchise in the Arena Football League. The team was coached by Doug Plank and played their home games at Wells Fargo Center. The Soul had the best record in the league at 15–3, and were able to advance to ArenaBowl XXV. However, they would be defeated by the Arizona Rattlers by a 72–54 score.

== Standings ==
East Division
Team	W	L	PCT	PF	PA	DIV	CON	Home	Away
z-Philadelphia Soul	15	3	.833	1228	919	4–2	12–2	7–2	8–1
Cleveland Gladiators	8	10	.444	879	875	4–2	6–8	5–4	3–6
Milwaukee Mustangs	5	13	.278	960	1062	3–3	4–7	2–6	3–7
Pittsburgh Power	5	13	.278	827	963	1–5	4–9	1–8	4–5

z - Clinched division and conference's best record

== Schedule ==
=== Regular season ===
The Soul had a bye week during the season's opening week, and began the season in week 2 on the road against the New Orleans VooDoo on March 18. Their first home game was on April 1 against the Cleveland Gladiators. They hosted the Utah Blaze on July 22 to conclude the regular season.

Week	Day	Date	Kickoff	Opponent	Results		Location	Report
Week	Day	Date	Kickoff	Opponent	Score	Record	Location	Report
1	Bye							
2	Sunday	March 18	4:00 p.m. EDT	at New Orleans VooDoo	W 63–62	1–0	New Orleans Arena	
3	Friday	March 23	8:00 p.m. EDT	at Pittsburgh Power	W 84–59	2–0	Consol Energy Center	
4	Sunday	April 1	6:05 p.m. EDT	Cleveland Gladiators	L 62–68	2–1	Wells Fargo Center	
5	Saturday	April 7	7:00 p.m. EDT	at Georgia Force	W 92–42	3–1	Arena at Gwinnett Center	
6	Sunday	April 15	6:05 p.m. EDT	San Jose SaberCats	W 61–55	4–1	Wells Fargo Center	
7	Friday	April 20	8:00 p.m. EDT	Tampa Bay Storm	W 83–48	5–1	Wells Fargo Center	
8	Saturday	April 28	7:30 p.m. EDT	at Orlando Predators	W 69–53	6–1	Amway Center	
9	Saturday	May 5	7:05 p.m. EDT	Milwaukee Mustangs	L 63–64	6–2	Wells Fargo Center	
10	Saturday	May 12	7:05 p.m. EDT	Jacksonville Sharks	W 56–38	7–2	Wells Fargo Center	
11	Friday	May 18	11:00 p.m. EDT	at Spokane Shock	L 47–65	7–3	Spokane Veterans Memorial Arena	
12	Sunday	May 27	4:00 p.m. EDT	at Cleveland Gladiators	W 55–33	8–3	Quicken Loans Arena	
13	Saturday	June 2	7:05 p.m. EDT	Orlando Predators	W 79–48	9–3	Wells Fargo Center	
14	Friday	June 8	8:00 p.m. EDT	at Milwaukee Mustangs	W 69–62	10–3	BMO Harris Bradley Center	
15	Saturday	June 16	7:00 p.m. EDT	at Jacksonville Sharks	W 62–27	11–3	Jacksonville Veterans Memorial Arena	
16	Sunday	June 24	6:05 p.m. EDT	Pittsburgh Power	W 69–34	12–3	Wells Fargo Center	
17	Saturday	June 30	7:30 p.m. EDT	at Tampa Bay Storm	W 83–79	13–3	Tampa Bay Times Forum	
18	Sunday	July 8	6:05 p.m. EDT	Spokane Shock	W 62–48	14–3	Wells Fargo Center	
19	Bye							
20	Sunday	July 22	6:05 p.m. EDT	Utah Blaze	W 69–34	15–3	Wells Fargo Center	

=== Playoffs ===
Round	Day	Date	Kickoff	Opponent	Results	Location	Report
AC Semifinals	Saturday	July 28	7:05 p.m. EDT	New Orleans VooDoo	W 66–53	Wells Fargo Center	
AC Championship	Friday	August 3	8:00 p.m. EDT	Jacksonville Sharks	W 89–34	Wells Fargo Center	
ArenaBowl XXV	Friday	August 10	10:30 p.m. EDT	Arizona Rattlers	L 54–72	New Orleans Arena	
