= 2012 Pittsburgh Power season =

Season of American football

- Head coach: Chris Siegfried (fired on May 21; 2–8 record); Derek Stingley (interim tag removed July 17; 3–5 record)
- Home stadium: Consol Energy Center

Results
- Record: 5–13
- Division place: 4th AC East
- Playoffs: Did not qualify

The 2012 Pittsburgh Power season was the second season for the franchise in the Arena Football League. The team played their home games at Consol Energy Center. After a 2–8 start, head coach Chris Siegfried was fired and replaced by defensive coordinator Derek Stingley. The Power finished the season 5–13 and did not qualify for the playoffs.

== Standings ==
East Division
Team	W	L	PCT	PF	PA	DIV	CON	Home	Away
z-Philadelphia Soul	15	3	.833	1228	919	4–2	12–2	7–2	8–1
Cleveland Gladiators	8	10	.444	879	875	4–2	6–8	5–4	3–6
Milwaukee Mustangs	5	13	.278	960	1062	3–3	4–7	2–6	3–7
Pittsburgh Power	5	13	.278	827	963	1–5	4–9	1–8	4–5

z - Clinched division and conference's best record

== Schedule ==
The Power began the season on the road against the Orlando Predators on March 9. Their home opener was on March 23 against the Philadelphia Soul. They hosted the Jacksonville Sharks on July 20 in their final regular season game.

Week	Day	Date	Kickoff (ET)	TV	Opponent	Results		Location	Report
Week	Day	Date	Kickoff (ET)	TV	Opponent	Score	Record	Location	Report
1	Friday	March 9	8:30 p.m.	NFL Network	at Orlando Predators	W 40–26	1–0	Amway Center	
2	Bye								
3	Friday	March 23	8:00 p.m.	NFL Network	Philadelphia Soul	L 59–84	1–1	Consol Energy Center	
4	Thursday	March 29	8:00 p.m.	WPCW	at Milwaukee Mustangs	L 40–63	1–2	Bradley Center	
5	Friday	April 6	7:30 p.m.	WPCW	Iowa Barnstormers	L 42–55	1–3	Consol Energy Center	
6	Saturday	April 14	7:30 p.m.	WPCW	Orlando Predators	W 57–54 (OT)	2–3	Consol Energy Center	
7	Friday	April 20	8:00 p.m.	WPCW	at New Orleans VooDoo	L 48–51	2–4	New Orleans Arena	
8	Saturday	April 28	7:30 p.m.	WPCW	Cleveland Gladiators	L 43–58	2–5	Consol Energy Center	
9	Saturday	May 5	8:00 p.m.	WPCW	Georgia Force	L 52–55	2–6	Consol Energy Center	
10	Saturday	May 12	8:00 p.m.	WPCW	at San Antonio Talons	L 52–68	2–7	Alamodome	
11	Saturday	May 19	7:30 p.m.	WPCW	Kansas City Command	L 37–43	2–8	Consol Energy Center	
12	Bye								
13	Saturday	June 2	9:00 p.m.	WPCW	at Arizona Rattlers	L 45–55	2–9	US Airways Center	
14	Friday	June 8	8:00 p.m.		at Cleveland Gladiators	W 2–0^{[a]}	3–9	Quicken Loans Arena	
15	Saturday	June 16	7:30 p.m.	WPCW	Milwaukee Mustangs	L 62–63	3–10	Consol Energy Center	
16	Sunday	June 24	6:05 p.m.	WPCW	at Philadelphia Soul	L 34–69	3–11	Wells Fargo Center	
17	Saturday	June 30	8:05 p.m.	WPCW	at Iowa Barnstormers	W 56–49	4–11	Wells Fargo Arena	
18	Saturday	July 7	7:30 p.m.	WPCW	Tampa Bay Storm	L 61–65	4–12	Consol Energy Center	
19	Saturday	July 14	7:00 p.m.	WPCW	at Georgia Force	W 58–41	5–12	Arena at Gwinnett Center	
20	Friday	July 20	8:00 p.m.	NFL Network	Jacksonville Sharks	L 39–64	5–13	Consol Energy Center	

- Gray indicates that the game was played during a labor dispute. On March 9 against Orlando, some replacement players were used and the game went on as scheduled.
- ^{a} Due to a players' strike within the Cleveland Gladiators, the Gladiators were unable to field enough players, and forfeited the game.

== Final roster ==
2012 Pittsburgh Power roster
Quarterbacks: 5 Andrico Hines; 3 Bryan Randall; Fullbacks: 34 Tyre Young; Wide receivers: 8 P. J. Berry; 10 A. J. Jackson; 14 Oderick Turner; 1 Mike Washington	Offensive linemen: 56 Beau Elliott; 64 Greg Niland; 69 Sione Ohuafi; 96 Moqut Ruffins; Defensive linemen: 95 Jason Jones; 9 Justin Parrish; 52 Dominie Pittman; 4 Neil Purvis; 93 Terrance Taylor	Linebackers: 45 Anthony DeGrate; 21 John Green; Defensive backs: 7 Chris LeFlore; 6 Davion Mitchell; 2 Christian Wise; Kickers: 28 Ryan Gates	Injured reserve Rookies in italics Roster updated July 20, 2012
