= Josue Paul =

American gridiron football player (born 1988)

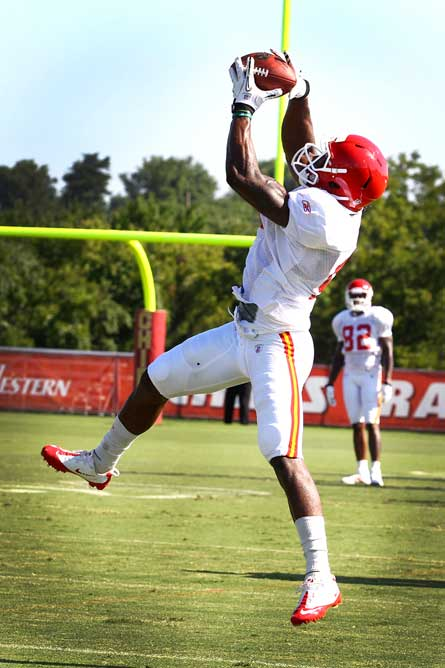

Profile
- Position: Wide receiver / Return specialist / Running back

Personal information
- Born: November 14, 1988 (age 38); Delray Beach, Florida
- Listed height: 6 ft 1 in (1.85 m)
- Listed weight: 218 lb (99 kg)

Career information
- College: Central Connecticut
- NFL draft: 2011: undrafted

Career history
- Kansas City Chiefs (2011)*; Indianapolis Colts (2011); Denver Broncos (2012)*; Milwaukee Mustangs (2012); Iowa Barnstormers (2013); Calgary Stampeders (2014)*; Green Bay Packers (2015)
- * Offseason or practice squad member only

Awards and highlights
- 3× First-team All-NEC (2008–2011)

Career AFL statistics
- Receptions: 98
- Receiving yards: 1269
- Receiving TDs: 5
- Stats at ArenaFan.com
- Stats at Pro Football Reference

Josue Wildor Paul (born November 14, 1988) is an American former gridiron football wide receiver. He was drafted by the Kansas City Chiefs in the seventh round of the 2011 NFL draft. He played college football at Central Connecticut State University (CCSU).

Paul was also a member of the Indianapolis Colts, Buffalo Bills, Denver Broncos, Hamilton Tiger-Cats, Calgary Stampeders, and Green Bay Packers.

== Early life ==
At a young age Paul enjoyed playing many different sports engaging in many different fitness activities. Paul began playing football at the age of 6 and quickly became serious pursuing football as a career path. Paul graduated from Pope John Paul II High School in Boca Raton, Florida in 2007. He was an avid student; involved in multiple programs in school, he was a letterman in football, basketball, and track, and a member of the Five Thousand Role Models of Excellence Program. In high school, he achieved second-team all-county and third-team all-state, he was also awarded the teams most improved player.

== College career ==
In 2007 Paul committed to Central Connecticut State University. Beginning in his college career he was placed as the starting returner and took a few snaps as a wide receiver. By his senior year he was leading his team as wide receiver.

- 2007: His freshman year, he averaged 21.9 yards per return on kickoffs and caught two passes for 29 yards and a touchdown. In the 2007 season he had a 95-yard return for touchdown in a win over Southern Connecticut.
- 2008: Paul averaged 20.3 return yards and caught 23 passes for 372 yards and a touchdown. He returned an 86-yard touchdown at Robert Morris.
- 2009: Paul was a First-team All-Conference selection, he led the team with 55 catches for 1036 yards and five touchdowns he averaged 15.2 yards per catch. On return Paul averaged 23 yards and returned a 95-yard touchdown against Robert Morris.
- 2010: Paul was named Preseason All-Conference, however, due to injury his season was cut short, but before his injury he had 19 catches for 498 yards and five touchdowns.

== Professional career ==
=== 2011 NFL Combine ===
Pre-draft measurables
Height	Weight	Arm length	Hand span	40-yard dash	10-yard split	20-yard split	20-yard shuttle	Three-cone drill	Vertical jump	Broad jump	Bench press
6 ft 1 1/2 in (1.87 m)	223 lb (101 kg)	35 in (0.89 m)	11 in (0.28 m)	4.47 s	1.52 s	2.71 s	4.41 s	7.03 s	37 1/2 in (0.95 m)	10 ft 5 in (3.18 m)	27 reps
All values from UCONN Pro Day

=== Kansas City Chiefs ===
Paul was signed by the Kansas City Chiefs on July 26, 2011 signed Paul to a three-year, $1.39 million contract that included a signing bonus of $80,000. The Chiefs waived Paul on September 3, 2011. After he cleared waivers, he was signed to the Chiefs practice squad.

=== Indianapolis Colts ===
Paul was signed to the practice squad of the Indianapolis Colts on December 16, 2011. On January 19 Paul signed a reserve future contract.

=== Milwaukee Mustangs ===
Paul was assigned to the Milwaukee Mustangs on November 9, 2011. He recorded 18 receptions for 269 yards and five touchdowns during the 2012 season.

=== Denver Broncos ===
The Denver Broncos signed Paul to the practice squad on September 28, 2012 He was released by the Broncos on August 31, 2013.

=== Iowa Barnstormers ===
Paul was assigned to the Iowa Barnstormers on February 5, 2013 and exempted on February 6, 2013. He was placed on the refused to report list May 3 and acitavted on June 19, 2013. He was placed on the refused to report list on June 20, 2013.

=== Calgary Stampeders ===
Paul signed with the Calgary Stampeders on May 27, 2013. He was released by the Stampeders on June 16, 2014.

=== Green Bay Packers ===
On February 2, 2015, the Packers announced that Paul had signed a 3-year, $1.575 million contract with the team. Only $25,000 of his contract was guaranteed for 2015, and he did not receive a signing bonus.

On September 5, 2015, the Green Bay Packers announced they had cut Paul from the team. He signed to the Packers' practice squad on September 6. After the season ended, Paul was not signed to a future/reserve contract by Green Bay, and became a free agent on January 12, 2016.

== After football ==
After his professional career in football, Paul pursued a career in exercise science. In 2013 Paul and Jeff Logan, body builder and former teammate at Central Connecticut State University, began the creation of a new fitness business called Become Fitness. The gym is in the works and plans to launch the summer of 2014. Paul and Logan are ecstatic upon the launch of something they have dreamed since they were teammates in college.
