= James Rogers (American football) =

American gridiron football player (born 1988)

No. 14
- Position: Cornerback

Personal information
- Born: May 27, 1988 (age 38); Detroit, Michigan, U.S.
- Listed height: 6 ft 0 in (1.83 m)
- Listed weight: 188 lb (85 kg)

Career information
- High school: Lamphere High School
- College: Michigan
- NFL draft: 2011: undrafted

Career history
- Denver Broncos (2011)*; Kansas City Command (2012); Arizona Rattlers (2012)*; Tampa Bay Buccaneers (2012–2013)*; Kansas City Chiefs (2013)*; Hamilton Tiger-Cats (2013–2014)
- * Offseason or practice squad member only
- Stats at Pro Football Reference
- Stats at CFL.ca (archive)

James Rogers (born May 27, 1988) is an American former football cornerback. Rogers was a member of the Tampa Bay Buccaneers and Kansas City Chiefs of the National Football League (NFL).

== Professional career ==
Pre-draft measurables
Height	Weight	40-yard dash	10-yard split	20-yard split	20-yard shuttle	Three-cone drill	Vertical jump	Broad jump	Bench press
6 ft 0 1/4 in (1.84 m)	182 lb (83 kg)	4.42 s	1.57 s	2.59 s	4.16 s	6.80 s	33.5 in (0.85 m)	9 ft 9 in (2.97 m)	15 reps
All values from Pro Day

=== Kansas City Command ===
Rogers was assigned to the Kansas City Command of the Arena Football League in 2012. He played in three games with the Command.

=== Tampa Bay Buccaneers ===
Rogers was signed to the Tampa Bay Buccaneers practice squad on December 11, 2012.

=== Kansas City Chiefs ===
Rogers signed with the Kansas City Chiefs on May 14, 2013.

=== Hamilton Tiger-Cats ===
Rogers signed with the Hamilton Tiger-Cats on September 5, 2013.
