= Jared Jenkins =

American football player (born 1989)

No. 15
- Positions: Wide receiver, defensive back

Personal information
- Born: April 26, 1989 (age 37); Milwaukee, Wisconsin, U.S.
- Listed height: 6 ft 3 in (1.91 m)
- Listed weight: 230 lb (104 kg)

Career information
- High school: Rufus King (Milwaukee)
- College: Wisconsin-Stevens Point
- NFL draft: 2011: undrafted

Career history
- Detroit Lions (2011)*; St. Louis Rams (2011)*; Milwaukee Mustangs (2012); Utah Blaze (2013)*; Chicago Rush (2013)
- * Offseason or practice squad member only

Awards and highlights
- All-time WIAC Team

Career AFL statistics
- Receptions: 200
- Yards: 2,546
- Receiving TDs: 56
- Tackles: 25
- Stats at ArenaFan.com

Jared Jenkins (born April 26, 1989) is an American former professional arena football wide receiver and defensive back. Jenkins was signed by the Milwaukee Mustangs as an undrafted free agent in 2011. Jenkins completed his college career at Wisconsin-Stevens Point.

== Professional career ==
=== Milwaukee Mustangs ===
Jenkins joined the Milwaukee Mustangs of the Arena Football League in 2012. He started all 18 games and caught 119 passes for 1,610 yards and 34 touchdowns.

=== Utah Blaze ===
Jenkins joined the Utah Blaze during preseason camp in 2013. One week before the season started, the Blaze placed Jenkins on recallable assignment.

=== Chicago Rush ===
With the Blaze failing to trade or activate Jenkins, the Chicago Rush claimed Jenkins after Week 1 of the regular season.
