= Chris Hart (Canadian football) =

American football player (born 1988)

No. 1
- Position: Quarterback

Personal information
- Born: March 10, 1988 (age 38); Bradenton, Florida, U.S.
- Listed height: 6 ft 2 in (1.88 m)
- Listed weight: 220 lb (100 kg)

Career information
- High school: Southeast (Bradenton)
- College: Valdosta State (2007–2008); Georgia Military College (2009); Towson (2010); Webber International (2011)
- NFL draft: 2012: undrafted

Career history
- Tampa Bay Storm (2012); BC Lions (2013)

Awards and highlights
- NCAA Division II national champion (2007)

Chris Hart (born March 10, 1988) is an American former professional football quarterback who played for the BC Lions of the Canadian Football League (CFL). He played college football at Valdosta State, Georgia Military College, Towson, and Webber International.

== Early life ==
Chris Hart was born on March 10, 1988, in Bradenton, Florida. He played high school football at Southeast High School in Bradenton, and was a two-time all-county selection.

== College career ==
Hart enrolled at Valdosta State University to play college football for the Valdosta State Blazers. He redshirted the 2007 season in which Valdosta State won the NCAA Division II national championship. Hart split time with Tucker Pruitt in 2008. Hart played in all 12 games, starting four, completing 143 of 251 passes (57.0%) for 1,841 yards, 19 touchdowns, and five interceptions while also rushing for 243 yards and two touchdowns. He was named the Gulf South Conference Freshman of the Year for his performance during the 2008 season.

In January 2009, it was reported that Hart had left Valdosta State due to legal reasons. He would spend the 2009 season at Georgia Military College with plans to return to Valdosta State in 2010. He started ten games for the Bulldogs in 2009, recording 80 completions on 176 passing attempts for 1,060 yards, 22 touchdowns, and 12 interceptions while also running 93 times for 362 yards and three touchdowns. Hart led the team to a 6–4 record. He was rated a three-star junior college prospect by Rivals.com.

In 2010, Hart transferred to play for the Towson Tigers of the NCAA Division I Football Championship Subdivision. In the season opener against Indiana, he set the school's single-game record for rushing yards by a quarterback with 124. Overall in 2010, he completed 82 of 172 passes (47.7%) for 1,013 yards, nine touchdowns, and six touchdowns. Hart averaged 64.8 rushing yards per game. On November 5, 2010, he was suspended indefinitely for a violation of team rules.

Under NCAA rules, Hart would have had to sit out a season if he transferred to another NCAA school, so he decided to play for the Webber International Warriors of the National Association of Intercollegiate Athletics. He played in six games during the 2011 season, completing 85 of 149 passes for 1,258 yards and 15 touchdowns while rushing for 216 yards and two touchdowns. He was invited to play in The Battle for Florida All-Star Game. Hart majored in criminal justice at Webber International.

== Professional career ==
After going undrafted in the 2012 NFL draft, Hart attended rookie minicamp on a tryout basis with the Seattle Seahawks. On July 12, 2012, he was assigned to the Tampa Bay Storm of the Arena Football League (AFL). However, he did not record any statistics during the 2012 AFL season.

On April 29, 2013, Hart signed with the BC Lions of the Canadian Football League (CFL) after impressing the team at a tryout camp in Florida. Lions general manager Wally Buono said "He’s got a very strong, accurate arm and some physical attributes that are well-suited to our game." Hart passed over Jarrett Brown to become the team's 4th-string quarterback for training camp (behind Travis Lulay, Thomas DeMarco, and Joey Elliott). Hart was placed on the nine-game injured list on June 27, before the start of the 2013 CFL season. He was promoted to the active roster on September 6. He dressed for the September 7 game against the Hamilton Tiger-Cats but did not record any statistics. On September 14, Hart was placed on the nine-game injured list again, where he remained for the rest of the season. In June 2014, he was released by the Lions after the first practice of training camp in favor of Travis Partridge.
