= 2012 Georgia Force season =

Arena Football League team season

- Head coach: Dean Cokinos
- Home stadium: Arena at Gwinnett Center

Results
- Record: 9–9
- Division place: 2nd AC South
- Playoffs: Lost Conference Semifinals (Sharks) 56–58

The 2012 Georgia Force season was the ninth season for the franchise in the Arena Football League. The team was coached by Dean Cokinos and played their home games at Arena at Gwinnett Center. The Force qualified for the playoffs after finishing the regular season with a 9–9 record, but lost in the conference semifinals to the Jacksonville Sharks. Jacksonville kicked a game-winning field goal as time expired to win the game 58–56. Following this season, it was announced that the Force had folded.

== Final roster ==
2012 Georgia Force roster
Quarterbacks: 4 Darnell Kennedy; 9 Bryant Moniz; Fullbacks: 21 Lance Ancar; 44 Benji McDowell; Wide receivers: 5 C. J. Johnson; 8 Michael Johnson; 18 Syvelle Newton; 1 Larry Shipp	Offensive linemen: 68 Sean Allen; 66 Curtis Duron; 70 Raymond Norell; 54 Kevin McAlmont; 53 Bruce McCaleb; Defensive linemen: 43 Darian Barnes; 50 LeRoy Burgess; -- Tremaine Johnson; 11 Matt Marcorelle; -- Marcus Owens; 56 Jerry Turner	Linebackers: 19 Caleb Bostic; 10 Jeremy Grier; Defensive backs: 6 Tracy Belton; 13 Quentin Burrell; 3 Robert Durham; 20 Ahmad Hawkins; 2 Marrio Norman; Kickers: 7 Carlos Martinez	Injury Reserve: 92 Louis Ellis DL; 99 Jarvis Geathers DL; 18 Shay Hodge WR; Other League Exempt: 12 R. J. Archer QB; -- Armando Murillo DB; Refuse to Report: -- Rodney Bradley WR; -- Simmie Yarborough WR; League Suspension: 3 Roger Brown DB; 58 Kris Cooke DL; 4 Brett Elliott QB; -- Bryan Jean-Pierre DL; rookies in italics Roster updated July 26, 2012; 27 Active, 11 Inactive → More rosters

== Standings ==
South Division
Team	W	L	PCT	PF	PA	DIV	CON	Home	Away
y-Jacksonville Sharks	10	8	.556	930	884	4–4	8–6	6–4	4–4
x-Georgia Force	9	9	.500	812	923	5–3	8–5	5–4	4–5
x-New Orleans VooDoo	8	10	.444	979	995	5–3	7–5	4–5	4–5
Tampa Bay Storm	8	10	.444	1021	1108	4–4	7–7	7–2	1–8
Orlando Predators	4	14	.222	770	902	2–6	4–11	4–5	0–9

y - Clinched division
x - Clinched playoff berth

== Schedule ==
=== Regular season ===
The Force began the season at home against the Cleveland Gladiators on March 12. They visited the New Orleans VooDoo in their final regular season game on July 21.

Week	Day	Date	Kickoff	Opponent	Results		Location	Report
Week	Day	Date	Kickoff	Opponent	Score	Record	Location	Report
1	Monday	March 12	7:30 p.m. EDT	Cleveland Gladiators	W 41–39	1–0	Arena at Gwinnett Center	
2	Friday	March 16	8:00 p.m. EDT	at Tampa Bay Storm	L 47–50	1–1	Tampa Bay Times Forum	
3	Saturday	March 24	7:00 p.m. EDT	at Jacksonville Sharks	W 69–41	2–1	Jacksonville Veterans Memorial Arena	
4	Bye							
5	Saturday	April 7	7:00 p.m. EDT	Philadelphia Soul	L 42–92	2–2	Arena at Gwinnett Center	
6	Saturday	April 14	7:00 p.m. EDT	Chicago Rush	W 70–49	3–2	Arena at Gwinnett Center	
7	Friday	April 20	7:30 p.m. EDT	at Orlando Predators	L 24–27	3–3	Amway Center	
8	Sunday	April 29	3:00 p.m. EDT	Arizona Rattlers	L 27–60	3–4	Arena at Gwinnett Center	
9	Saturday	April 5	8:00 p.m. EDT	at Pittsburgh Power	W 55–52	4–4	Consol Energy Center	
10	Saturday	May 12	7:00 p.m. EDT	Tampa Bay Storm	W 44–41	5–4	Arena at Gwinnett Center	
11	Friday	May 18	8:00 p.m. EDT	at Milwaukee Mustangs	W 58–55	6–4	Bradley Center	
12	Saturday	May 26	8:00 p.m. EDT	at Kansas City Command	L 27–39	6–5	Sprint Center	
13	Saturday	June 2	7:00 p.m. EDT	New Orleans VooDoo	L 35–57	6–6	Arena at Gwinnett Center	
14	Saturday	June 9	7:00 p.m. EDT	Jacksonville Sharks	W 56–39	7–6	Arena at Gwinnett Center	
15	Saturday	June 16	8:00 p.m. EDT	at Chicago Rush	L 27–62	7–7	Allstate Arena	
16	Saturday	June 23	9:00 p.m. EDT	at Utah Blaze	L 38–61	7–8	EnergySolutions Arena	
17	Sunday	July 1	3:00 p.m. EDT	Orlando Predators	W 56–53	8–8	Arena at Gwinnett Center	
18	Bye							
19	Saturday	July 14	7:00 p.m. EDT	Pittsburgh Power	L 41–58	8–9	Arena at Gwinnett Center	
20	Saturday	July 21	8:00 p.m. EDT	at New Orleans VooDoo	W 55–48	9–9	New Orleans Arena	

=== Playoffs ===
Round	Day	Date	Kickoff	Opponent	Results	Location	Report
AC Semifinals	Saturday	July 28	7:00 p.m. EDT	at Jacksonville Sharks	L 56–58	Jacksonville Veterans Memorial Arena	
