= Aaron Lesué =

American football player (born 1982)

Profile
- Position: Wide receiver

Personal information
- Born: July 9, 1982 (age 44); Joplin, Missouri, U.S.
- Listed height: 5 ft 10 in (1.78 m)
- Listed weight: 190 lb (86 kg)

Career information
- High school: Churchill County (Fallon, Nevada)
- College: Utah State
- NFL draft: 2008: undrafted

Career history
- Utah Blaze (2010–2013); Pittsburgh Power (2014); Portland Thunder (2015)*
- * Offseason or practice squad member only

Awards and highlights
- First Team All-Arena (2012)

Career AFL statistics
- Receptions: 371
- Yards: 4,290
- Touchdowns: 115
- Tackles: 46
- Interceptions: 0
- Stats at ArenaFan.com

Aaron Lesué (born July 9, 1982) is a former Arena football wide receiver. Lesué was signed by the Utah Blaze as an undrafted free agent in 2010. Lesué completed his college career at Utah State University.

== Early life ==
Born the son of Michael Lesué and Karissa Maloy, Aaron attended Churchill County High School in Fallon, Nevada.

== College football career ==
=== Dixie State ===
After high school Lesué attended Dixie State College in St. George, Utah, where he continued his football career. Lesué saw limited action during his time with the Rebels, catching only 17 passes for 258 yards and one touchdown, while also playing defensive back.

=== Utah State ===
Lesué continued his football career as a walk-on for Utah State University. He played mainly at wide receiver for the Aggies, but also saw action at tailback due to injuries, as well as on special teams. He had 10 catches for 131 yards on the year. Lesue started the season finale against New Mexico State University at tailback and rushed 11 times for 34 yards, while catching four balls for 33 yards in that game. He also had three kickoff returns for 73 yards. Nine of his ten receptions came in the final four games of the year, including two for a season-best 55 yards against the University of Hawaii. His four receptions against NMSU were a season-best. Lesue was credited with six tackles on special teams play during the season.

== Professional football career ==
=== Utah Blaze ===
Lesué joined the Utah Blaze of the Arena Football League as a rookie in 2010. In 2012, he caught 154 passes for 1,787 yards and 55 touchdowns. His 154 receptions are tied for 11th on the Arena Football League's all-time single season list, while his 55 touchdowns are the 3rd most in AFL history.

=== Pittsburgh Power ===
Lesué was selected by the Pittsburgh Power in the dispersal draft on September 6, 2013. Lesué suffered a torn anterior cruciate ligament against the Cleveland Gladiators on April 26, bringing his 2014 season to an end. In six games with the Power, Lesué recorded 59 receptions for 610 yards and 12 TDs. The Power folded in November 2014.

=== Portland Thunder ===
On March 5, 2015, Lesué was assigned to the Portland Thunder.

== Other sports ==
Lesué also competes in three other disciplines; rugby union, bobsleigh, and skeleton at the Winter Olympics. Lesué is a member of the U.S. development team in rugby, a sport that overlaps the indoor football season. He also wants to resume training in the other two as soon as possible in hopes of competing in the 2018 Winter Olympics in Pyeongchang, South Korea.

== Personal life ==
Lesué and several other people helped rescue Brianna Hatch from her car when it rolled several times and caught fire on Interstate 15 near Orem, Utah on April 24, 2013. Hatch is a figure skater who has represented the United States in international competition. Lesué was driving home from a Utah Blaze practice when he saw the accident occur in front of him. He and the others helped drag Hatch from her vehicle and put out the fire with an extinguisher. Hatch and Lesué have remained good friends since the incident.
