= Odie Armstrong =

American football player (born 1981)

No. 32
- Position: Fullback

Personal information
- Born: September 30, 1981 (age 45); Vardaman, Mississippi, U.S.
- Listed height: 5 ft 11 in (1.80 m)
- Listed weight: 275 lb (125 kg)

Career information
- High school: Vardaman
- College: Northwestern Oklahoma State
- NFL draft: 2007: undrafted

Career history
- Orlando Predators (2008); California Redwoods (2009); Tulsa Talons (2010); Arizona Rattlers (2011–2013); San Jose SaberCats (2014–2015)

Awards and highlights
- 3× ArenaBowl champion (2012, 2013, 2015); 3× Second-team All-Arena (2010, 2012, 2013); AFL All-Rookie Team (2008)

Career AFL statistics
- Rushing attempts: 454
- Rushing yards: 1,438
- Rushing touchdowns: 101
- Receiving yards: 816
- Receiving touchdowns: 15
- Stats at ArenaFan.com

Odie Armstrong (born September 30, 1981) is an American former professional football fullback. He played college football at Northwestern Oklahoma State University. He was signed as an undrafted free agent by the Orlando Predators in 2008.

== Early life ==
Armstrong attended Vardaman High School where he was a standout on the football team. During his high school career, Armstrong ran for 5,838 yards and 104 touchdowns. During his senior year, Armstrong set a Mississippi state record with 39 rushing touchdowns. In 2012, Vardaman retired Armstrong's #9 jersey.

== College career ==
Armstrong attended Itawamba Community College after high school. After his graduation from Itawamba, Armstrong attended Northwestern Oklahoma State University, where he continued his football career.

== Professional career ==
Armstrong joined the Tulsa Talons, who just moved in the AFL from af2. Armstrong earned Second Team All-Arena honors for the first time in his career.

Armstrong joined the Arizona Rattlers in 2011. Earning All-Arena honors in 2012 & 2013, Armstrong was a big part of the Rattlers back-to-back ArenaBowl Championships.

On April 10, 2014, Armstrong was assigned to the San Jose SaberCats.
