= Ben Stallings =

American football player (born 1987)

No. 48
- Position: Fullback

Personal information
- Born: August 27, 1987 (age 39); Greenville, Mississippi, U.S.
- Listed height: 5 ft 11 in (1.80 m)
- Listed weight: 265 lb (120 kg)

Career information
- High school: Bayou Academy (Cleveland, Mississippi)
- College: Lambuth
- NFL draft: 2010: undrafted

Career history
- Jacksonville Jaguars (2010)*; Utah Blaze (2011–2013); Iowa Barnstormers (2014)*
- * Offseason or practice squad member only

Career AFL statistics
- Rushing yards: 507
- Receiving yards: 82
- Tackles: 10
- Sacks: 1.5
- Total TDs: 35
- Stats at ArenaFan.com

Ben Stallings (born August 27, 1987) is an American former professional football fullback. He was signed by the Jacksonville Jaguars as an undrafted free agent in 2010. He played college football at Lambuth University.
