= Victor DeGrate =

American football player (born 1985)

No. 42
- Position: Defensive end

Personal information
- Born: February 8, 1985 (age 41); DeSoto, Texas
- Listed height: 6 ft 4 in (1.93 m)
- Listed weight: 255 lb (116 kg)

Career information
- College: Oklahoma State
- NFL draft: 2007: undrafted

Career history
- Houston Texans (2007)*; Detroit Lions (2007–2008)*; Cincinnati Bengals (2008–2009)*; Tulsa Talons (2011); San Antonio Talons (2012–2013)
- * Offseason or practice squad member only

Awards and highlights
- First-team All-Arena (2012); Second-team All-Big 12 (2006)

Career AFL statistics
- Tackles: 37
- Sacks: 12.5
- Forced Fumbles: 7
- Interceptions: 1
- Stats at ArenaFan.com

Victor DeGrate Jr. (born February 8, 1985) is an American former football defensive end. He was signed by the Houston Texans as an undrafted free agent in 2007. He played college football at Oklahoma State.

DeGrate was also member of the Detroit Lions and Cincinnati Bengals.
