= Francis Maka =

American football player (born 1985)

No. 98
- Position: Linebacker

Personal information
- Born: August 10, 1985 (age 41); Hillsborough, California, U.S.
- Listed height: 6 ft 2 in (1.88 m)
- Listed weight: 255 lb (116 kg)

Career information
- High school: San Jose (CA) Bellarmine Prep
- College: Hawai'i
- NFL draft: 2009: undrafted

Career history
- Arkansas Diamonds (2010); Spokane Shock (2011)*; San Jose SaberCats (2011–2015)
- * Offseason or practice squad member only

Awards and highlights
- ArenaBowl champion (2015); First-team All-Arena (2013); 3× Second-team All-Arena (2012, 2014, 2015)

Career AFL statistics
- Tackles: 142
- Sacks: 46
- Forced fumbles: 8
- Fumble recoveries: 8
- Stats at ArenaFan.com

Francis Tulikimoana Maka (born May 10, 1985) is an American former professional football linebacker who played for the San Jose SaberCats of the Arena Football League (AFL). He was signed by the Spokane Shock as an undrafted free agent in 2011. He played college football at University of Hawaiʻi at Mānoa.
