= Emmanuel Akah =

British gridiron football player (born 1979)

No. 77
- Position: Offensive lineman

Personal information
- Born: February 8, 1979 (age 47); London, England
- Listed height: 6 ft 3 in (1.91 m)
- Listed weight: 310 lb (141 kg)

Career information
- High school: Tottenville (Staten Island, New York)
- College: Winston-Salem State
- NFL draft: 2005: undrafted

Career history
- Rhein Fire (2006); Frankfurt Galaxy (2006); Miami Dolphins (2006)*; Frankfurt Galaxy (2007); Denver Broncos (2007)*; Kansas City Chiefs (2007)*; Tampa Bay Storm (2008–2010); San Jose SaberCats (2012); San Antonio Talons (2013); Jacksonville Sharks (2014)
- * Offseason or practice squad member only

Awards and highlights
- Second-team All-Arena (2012)

Career AFL statistics
- Tackles: 5
- Stats at ArenaFan.com

Emmanuel Akah (born February 8, 1979) is a British-American former football offensive lineman. He played college football for State University of New York at Canton and Winston-Salem State University.

Akah was born in London, England and attended Tottenville High School in Staten Island, New York. He is of Nigerian descent and lived in Nigeria from ages 6 to 8.

In 2006, Akah played for the Rhein Fire and Frankfurt Galaxy of NFL Europa. In 2007, he played with the Galaxy and spent time on the practice squad of the Kansas City Chiefs of the National Football League. The 6'3" and 330 pounds Akah has played in the preseason games with the Denver Broncos and the Miami Dolphins, also started in the preseason game of Denver Broncos vs Arizona Cardinals.
