= ArenaBowl XXV =

Annual league championship game

Arizona Rattlers (National)	Philadelphia Soul (American)
72	54
	1	2	3	4	Total
ARI	14	13	27	18	72
PHI	6	7	21	20	54
- Date: August 10, 2012
- Stadium: New Orleans Arena; New Orleans, Louisiana
- MVP: Nick Davila, Arizona: Maurice Purify, Arizona (Offensive Player of the Game); Arkeith Brown, Arizona (Defensive Player of the Game); Jeff Hughley, Philadelphia (Ironman of the Game)
- Attendance: 13,648
- Winning coach: Kevin Guy, Arizona
- Losing coach: Doug Plank, Philadelphia

TV in the United States
- Network: NFL Network
- Announcers: Ari Wolfe, Anthony Herron, and Sherdrick Bonner

ArenaBowl XXV was the 25th edition of the championship in the Arena Football League. The National Conference champion, Arizona Rattlers, defeated the American Conference champion, Philadelphia Soul, 72–54. The game was played on August 10, 2012. It was the first ArenaBowl at a neutral site since ArenaBowl XXII in 2008, also played in New Orleans. ArenaBowl XXV was played at the New Orleans Arena in New Orleans, Louisiana, home of the New Orleans VooDoo.

== Venue ==
ArenaBowl XXV was played at the New Orleans Arena in New Orleans, Louisiana. It was the first ArenaBowl at a neutral site since 2008. From 2005 to 2008, the ArenaBowl were hosted at neutral sites (Las Vegas and New Orleans). In 2010 and 2011, the games went to the highest seed in the game, which were Spokane, Washington and Phoenix, Arizona. The last two ArenaBowls at a neutral site (ArenaBowl XXI and ArenaBowl XXII) were also played in New Orleans in 2007 and 2008.

== Television ==
ArenaBowl XXV was televised on NFL Network after the AFL and NFL Network agreed on a third straight contract to carry games. The game was pushed back to a kickoff at 10:30 pm ET. NFL Network bumped the ArenaBowl back and instead broadcast Tim Tebow's preseason debut with the New York Jets, who faced the Cincinnati Bengals in the preseason.

== Background ==
=== Arizona Rattlers ===
In the previous season, the Rattlers lost ArenaBowl XXIV to the Jacksonville Sharks on the final play of the game. In 2012, they won a tightly contested West division with a 13–5 record for their third consecutive division title. They defeated division rivals San Jose and Utah, respectively, to win the National Conference championship. They returned to the ArenaBowl for the seventh time in their franchise's history, looking for their first league championship since ArenaBowl XI in 1997.

Week	Date	Opponent	Result
1	March 10	at San Jose	L 70–71 (OT)
2	March 17	Milwaukee	W 71–65
3	Bye		
4	March 29	at Kansas City	W 56–28
5	April 6	Spokane	W 57–53
6	April 14	at Iowa	L 54–56
7	April 22	San Antonio	W 68–34
8	April 29	at Georgia	W 60–27
9	May 5	San Jose	L 70–77
10	May 12	Chicago	W 77–43
11	May 19	at Utah	W 86–70
12	May 26	at New Orleans	W 69–45
13	June 2	Pittsburgh	W 55–45
14	June 9	Iowa	W 55–48
15	Bye		
16	June 22	Milwaukee	W 52–37
17	June 29	at Spokane	W 61–35
18	July 6	Utah	L 49–62
19	July 14	San Antonio	L 61–62
20	July 21	Kansas City	W 47–22
–	July 28	San Jose	W 51–48
–	August 4	Utah	W 75–68

=== Philadelphia Soul ===
After missing the playoffs in the prior season, the Soul compiled a league-best 15–3 record. They averaged 68.2 points per game, the most by one team in a single season. They beat the New Orleans VooDoo in the conference semifinals, then blew out the defending champion Jacksonville Sharks in the American Conference championship 89–34, the most one-sided victory in AFL postseason history. For Philadelphia, it was their second ArenaBowl appearance in franchise history, and their second in three seasons of play. Their prior ArenaBowl appearance occurred in 2008 when they won ArenaBowl XXII against the San Jose SaberCats 59–56. Following that season, the league suspended operations, and the Soul would not field a team again until 2011.

Week	Date	Opponent	Result
1	Bye		
2	March 18	at New Orleans	W 63–62
3	March 23	at Pittsburgh	W 84–59
4	April 1	Cleveland	L 62–68
5	April 7	at Georgia	W 92–42
6	April 15	San Jose	W 61–55
7	April 20	Tampa Bay	W 83–48
8	April 28	at Orlando	W 69–53
9	May 5	Milwaukee	L 63–64
10	May 12	Jacksonville	W 56–38
11	May 18	at Spokane	L 47–65
12	May 27	at Cleveland	W 55–33
13	June 2	Orlando	W 79–48
14	June 8	at Milwaukee	W 69–62
15	June 16	at Jacksonville	W 62–27
16	June 24	Pittsburgh	W 69–34
17	June 30	at Tampa Bay	W 83–79
18	July 8	Spokane	W 62–48
19	Bye		
20	July 22	Utah	W 69–34
–	July 28	New Orleans	W 66–53
–	August 3	Jacksonville	W 89–34

== Box score ==
Quarter	1	2	3	4	Total
Rattlers (NC)	14	13	27	18	72
Soul (AC)	6	7	21	20	54

at New Orleans Arena, New Orleans, Louisiana

- Date: August 10, 2012
- Game time: 10:30 p.m. EDT
- Game attendance: 13,648
- Referee: Joe Pester

Scoring summary

Quarter	Time	Drive			Team	Scoring information	Score	
Quarter	Time	Plays	Yards	TOP	Team	Scoring information	Rattlers	Soul
1	7:57	6 plays	22 yards	4:02	ARI	Maurice Purify 4-yard touchdown reception from Nick Davila, Chris Gould kick good	7	0
1	3:07	6 plays	45 yards	4:03	PHI	Derrick Ross 7-yard touchdown run, Fabrizio Scaccia kick no good	7	6
1	0:40	3 plays	36 yards	1:44	ARI	Kerry Reed 14-yard touchdown reception from Nick Davila, Chris Gould kick good	14	6
2	12:10	1 play	29 yards	0:18	ARI	Maurice Purify 29-yard touchdown reception from Nick Davila, Chris Gould kick good	21	6
2	7:28	4 plays	7 yards	2:17	ARI	30-yard field goal by Chris Gould	24	6
2	5:31	3 plays	40 yards	1:30	PHI	Jeff Hughley 26-yard touchdown reception from Dan Raudabaugh, Fabrizio Scaccia kick good	24	13
2	0:00	11 plays	7 yards	4:47	ARI	20-yard field goal by Chris Gould	27	13
3	13:55	2 plays	43 yards	0:55	ARI	Maurice Purify 38-yard touchdown reception from Nick Davila, Chris Gould kick good	34	13
3	10:00	5 plays	48 yards	2:58	PHI	Derrick Ross 31-yard touchdown reception from Dan Raudabaugh, Fabrizio Scaccia kick no good	34	19
3	8:28	2 plays	33 yards	1:03	ARI	Maurice Purify 29-yard touchdown reception from Nick Davila, Chris Gould kick good	41	19
3	4:23	4 plays	37 yards	3:20	PHI	Larry Brackins 10-yard touchdown reception from Dan Raudabaugh, Fabrizio Scaccia kick good	41	26
3	3:27	1 play	10 yards	1:33	ARI	Markee White 10-yard touchdown reception from Nick Davila, Chris Gould kick good	48	26
3	2:04	1 play	6 yards	0:39	ARI	Maurice Purify 29-yard touchdown reception from Nick Davila, Chris Gould kick no good (blocked)	54	26
3	0:11	2 plays	27 yards	0:53	PHI	Emery Sammons 21-yard touchdown reception from Dan Raudabaugh, 2-point pass good	54	34
4	14:25	1 play	13 yards	0:30	ARI	Maurice Purify 13-yard touchdown reception from Nick Davila, Chris Gould kick no good	60	34
4	12:05	3 plays	38 yards	1:33	PHI	Larry Brackins 12-yard touchdown reception from Dan Raudabaugh, 2-point pass good	60	42
4	8:54	4 plays	12 yards	2:27	ARI	Odie Armstrong 2-yard touchdown run, Chris Gould kick no good	66	42
4	5:23	5 plays	37 yards	2:34	PHI	Larry Brackins 8-yard touchdown reception from Dan Raudabaugh, 2-point pass no good	66	48
4	3:35	2 plays	19 yards	1:08	ARI	Maurice Purify 13-yard touchdown reception from Nick Davila, Chris Gould kick no good	72	48
4	0:42	7 plays	40 yards	1:57	PHI	Larry Brackins 3-yard touchdown reception from Dan Raudabaugh, 2-point pass no good	72	54
"TOP" = time of possession. For other American football terms, see Glossary of American football.							72	54
