= 2012 Arena Football League season =

- League: Arena Football League
- Sport: Arena football
- Duration: March 9, 2012 – August 10, 2012

Regular season
- Season champions: Philadelphia Soul
- Season MVP: Tommy Grady, UTA

AFL playoffs
- American Conference champions: Philadelphia Soul
- American Conference runners-up: Jacksonville Sharks
- National Conference champions: Arizona Rattlers
- National Conference runners-up: Utah Blaze

ArenaBowl XXV
- Champions: Arizona Rattlers
- Runners-up: Philadelphia Soul
- Finals MVP: Nick Davila, ARZ

AFL seasons
- ← 2011 2013 →

American: East, South
National: West, Central

The 2012 Arena Football League season was the 25th season in the history of the league. The regular season began on March 9, 2012 with a game between the Pittsburgh Power and the Orlando Predators and ended on July 22, 2012, with a game between the Utah Blaze and Philadelphia Soul. The Arizona Rattlers defeated the Philadelphia Soul by a 72–54 score in ArenaBowl XXV on August 10, 2012, to conclude the playoffs.

== League business ==
=== Teams ===
The only franchise that relocated during the offseason was the Tulsa Talons, which became the San Antonio Talons following a move to San Antonio, Texas, where the team announced they would play at the Alamodome.

When the 2012 schedule was announced, the Dallas Vigilantes were left off without any explanation on the status of the franchise. No expansion teams were added for the 2012 season.

=== Labor issues ===
On March 9, 2012, the day the AFL was to begin play, the Arena Football League Players Association went on strike, seeking a doubling of their wages. The game between the Pittsburgh Power and Orlando Predators scheduled for that night was played as scheduled with replacement players making up about three-quarters of the roster. However, players began crossing the picket line by the second quarter and the AFL announced the work stoppage ended just two hours after the game ended.

For the second game of the 2012 season, the entire roster of the San Antonio Talons voted unanimously not to strike for its first game against the Utah Blaze.

On June 8, the Cleveland Gladiators were forced to forfeit a week 14 matchup against the Pittsburgh Power when they were unable to field enough players to play as a result of several of their players going on strike. It was the first forfeited game in the history of the league. This news came after the NFL Network chose not to air a contest between the Milwaukee Mustangs and Philadelphia Soul in the network's weekly Friday night broadcast, citing a "labor uncertainty." In the following week, after reports of a potential lockout rose, the NFL Network chose to air a War on I-4 game between the Tampa Bay Storm and the Orlando Predators via tape delay on June 16, the day after the game took place.

On June 17, it was announced that the AFL and the AFLPU agreed to a multi-year collective bargaining agreement, to be signed on June 20.

== Regular season standings ==
American Conference
East Division
Team	W	L	PCT	PF	PA	DIV	CON	Home	Away
^{(1)} Philadelphia Soul	15	3	.833	1228	919	4–2	12–2	7–2	8–1
Cleveland Gladiators	8	10	.444	879	875	4–2	6–8	5–4	3–6
Milwaukee Mustangs^{[a]}	5	13	.278	960	1062	3–3	4–7	2–6	3–7
Pittsburgh Power	5	13	.278	827	963	1–5	4–9	1–8	4–5
South Division
Team	W	L	PCT	PF	PA	DIV	CON	Home	Away
^{(2)} Jacksonville Sharks	10	8	.556	930	884	4–4	8–6	6–4	4–4
^{(3)} Georgia Force	9	9	.500	812	923	5–3	8–5	5–4	4–5
^{(4)} New Orleans VooDoo^{[b]}	8	10	.444	979	995	5–3	7–5	4–5	4–5
Tampa Bay Storm	8	10	.444	1021	1108	4–4	7–7	7–2	1–8
Orlando Predators	4	14	.222	770	902	2–6	4–11	4–5	0–9
National Conference
Central Division
Team	W	L	PCT	PF	PA	DIV	CON	Home	Away
^{(1)} San Antonio Talons	14	4	.778	1042	949	5–1	9–4	8–1	6–3
Chicago Rush	10	8	.556	1047	1044	4–2	5–6	7–2	3–6
Iowa Barnstormers	7	11	.389	948	1032	3–3	5–9	4–5	3–6
Kansas City Command	3	15	.167	705	938	0–6	1–12	2–7	1–8
West Division
Team	W	L	PCT	PF	PA	DIV	CON	Home	Away
^{(2)} Arizona Rattlers	13	5	.722	1118	880	3–3	8–5	7–2	6–3
^{(3)} San Jose SaberCats^{[c]}	12	6	.667	1143	1027	4–2	10–4	8–1	4–5
^{(4)} Utah Blaze	12	6	.667	1128	1051	4–2	8–4	6–3	6–3
Spokane Shock	10	8	.556	1063	1048	1–5	5–7	5–4	5–4

Eight teams qualified for the playoffs: four teams from each conference, of which two are division champions and the other two have the best records of the teams remaining.

- Green indicates clinched playoff berth
- Blue indicates division champion
- Gray indicates division champion and conference's best record

=== Tie-breakers ===
- ^{a} Milwaukee finished in third place in the East Division based on a head-to-head sweep over Pittsburgh.
- ^{b} New Orleans clinched the American Conference's No. 4 seed based on a greater won-loss percentage among games between New Orleans, Tampa Bay, and Cleveland. (New Orleans: 2–1, Tampa Bay: 2–2, Cleveland: 1–2)
- ^{c} San Jose clinched the National Conference's No. 3 seed based on their greater point differential in head-to-head competition with Utah.

== Playoffs ==
Conference Semifinals
1	Philadelphia	66
4	New Orleans	53
American Conference
2	Jacksonville	58
3	Georgia	56
1	San Antonio	34
4	Utah	35
National Conference
2	Arizona	51
3	San Jose	48

Conference Championship
1	Philadelphia	89
2	Jacksonville	34
4	Utah	69
2	Arizona	75

ArenaBowl XXV
A1	Philadelphia	54
N2	Arizona	72

=== Conference semifinals ===
Conference	Date	Kickoff	Away	Home	Final score	Game site	Recap
National	July 27	8:00 p.m. EDT	Utah Blaze	San Antonio Talons	Utah, 35–34	Alamodome	
American	July 28	7:00 p.m. EDT	Georgia Force	Jacksonville Sharks	Jacksonville, 58–56	Jacksonville Veterans Memorial Arena	
American	July 28	7:05 p.m. EDT	New Orleans VooDoo	Philadelphia Soul	Philadelphia, 66–53	Wells Fargo Center	
National	July 28	10:00 p.m. EDT	San Jose SaberCats	Arizona Rattlers	Arizona, 51–48	US Airways Center	

=== Conference championships ===
Conference	Date	Kickoff	Away	Home	Final score	Game site	Recap
American	August 3	8:00 p.m. EDT	Jacksonville Sharks	Philadelphia Soul	Philadelphia, 89–34	Wells Fargo Center	
National	August 4	10:00 p.m. EDT	Utah Blaze	Arizona Rattlers	Arizona, 75–69	US Airways Center	

=== ArenaBowl XXV ===
Date	Kickoff	Away	Home	Final score	Game site	Recap
August 10	10:30 p.m. EDT	Arizona Rattlers	Philadelphia Soul	Arizona, 72–54	New Orleans Arena	

== All-Arena team ==
Offense
Position	First team	Second team
Quarterback	Tommy Grady, Utah	Nick Davila, Arizona
Fullback	Derrick Ross, Philadelphia	Odie Armstrong, Arizona
Center	Kyle Young, Arizona	Billy Eisenhardt, Chicago
Offensive lineman	Rich Ranglin, San Jose; Michael Huey, Arizona	George Bussey, Tampa Bay; Emmanuel Akah, San Jose
Wide receiver	Jesse Schmidt, Iowa; Maurice Purify, Arizona; Aaron Lesué, Utah	Reggie Gray, Chicago; Tiger Jones, Philadelphia; Dominick Goodman, Cleveland

Defense
Position	First team	Second team
Defensive lineman	Joe Sykes, San Jose; Mike Lewis, Utah; Victor DeGrate, San Antonio	Bryan Robinson, Philadelphia; Scooter Berry, Jacksonville; Luis Vasquez, Milwaukee
Middle linebacker	Aaron Robbins, Jacksonville	Francis Maka, San Jose
Jack linebacker	Alvin Ray Jackson, New Orleans	Marcus Everett, Milwaukee
Defensive back	Kent Richardson, Philadelphia; Jason Simpson, Iowa; Terrance Sanders, Spokane	Jeremy Kellem, New Orleans; Arkeith Brown, Arizona; Tracy Belton, Georgia

Special teams
Position	First team	Second team
Kicker	Kenny Spencer, Spokane	Nich Pertuit, San Jose
Kick returner	PJ Berry, Pittsburgh	Terrance Sanders, Spokane
