= 2001 AF2 season =

- League: AF2
- Sport: Arena football

Regular season
- Season champions: Quad City Steamwheelers

Playoffs
- Semifinals champions: Quad City Steamwheelers
- Semifinals runners-up: Carolina Rhinos
- Semifinals champions: Richmond Speed
- Semifinals runners-up: Tennessee Valley Vipers

ArenaCup II
- Champions: Quad City Steamwheelers
- Runners-up: Richmond Speed

AF2 seasons
- ← 2000 2002 →

The 2001 AF2 season was the second season of the AF2. The league champions were the Quad City Steamwheelers, who defended their title with a victory over the Richmond Speed in ArenaCup II. This is the first time that both conferences contained two divisions each, like the Arena Football League.

== League info ==
New teams	Baton Rouge Blaze, Bossier City Battle Wings, Columbus Wardogs, Florida Firecats, Iowa Barnstormers, Lafayette Roughnecks, Lincoln Lightning, Louisville Fire, Macon Knights, Memphis Xplorers, Peoria Pirates, Rochester Brigade, Wichita Stealth
Renamed / Relocated teams	None
Defunct teams	None
Total teams	28

== Standings ==
Team	Overall			Division		
Team	Wins	Losses	Percentage	Wins	Losses	Percentage
American Conference
Northeast Division
Richmond Speed	13	3	0.812	8	2	0.800
Carolina Rhinos	12	4	0.750	7	3	0.700
Norfolk Nighthawks	7	9	0.437	6	4	0.600
Roanoke Steam	7	9	0.437	5	5	0.500
Charleston Swamp Foxes	7	9	0.437	3	7	0.300
Greensboro Prowlers	5	11	0.312	4	6	0.400
Rochester Brigade	4	12	0.250	2	8	0.200
Southeast Division
Tallahassee Thunder	11	5	0.687	7	3	0.700
Macon Knights	10	6	0.625	7	3	0.700
Jacksonville Tomcats	9	7	0.562	7	3	0.700
Augusta Stallions	9	7	0.562	7	3	0.700
Florida Firecats	7	9	0.437	3	7	0.300
Pensacola Barracudas	5	11	0.312	4	6	0.400
Columbus Wardogs	0	16	0.000	0	10	0.000
National Conference
South Central Division
Tennessee Valley Vipers	14	2	0.875	9	1	0.900
Birmingham Steeldogs	12	4	0.750	6	4	0.600
Baton Rouge Blaze	10	6	0.625	7	3	0.700
Bossier City Battle Wings	7	9	0.437	4	6	0.400
Arkansas Twisters	6	10	0.375	6	4	0.600
Lafayette Roughnecks	3	13	0.187	2	8	0.200
Memphis Xplorers	3	13	0.187	1	9	0.100
Midwest Division
Quad City Steamwheelers	15	1	0.937	9	1	0.900
Tulsa Talons	13	3	0.812	8	2	0.800
Iowa Barnstormers	9	7	0.562	4	6	0.400
Peoria Pirates	7	9	0.437	4	6	0.400
Wichita Stealth	7	9	0.437	3	7	0.300
Louisville Fire	6	10	0.375	4	6	0.400
Lincoln Lightning	6	10	0.375	3	7	0.300

- Green indicates clinched playoff berth
- Purple indicates division champion
- Grey indicates best regular season record

== Playoffs ==
Round 1
8	Macon	55
1	Quad Cities	80
6	Carolina	69
3	Tulsa	35
7	Tallahassee	52
2	Tennessee Valley	70
5	Birmingham	60
4	Richmond	67

Semifinals
1	Quad Cities	35
6	Carolina	16
2	Tennessee Valley	50
4	Richmond	51

ArenaCup II
1	Quad Cities	55
4	Richmond	51

== Awards and honors ==
=== Regular season awards ===
Award	Winner	Position	Team
Offensive Player of the Year	Jay McDonagh	Quarterback	Quad City Steamwheelers
Defensive Player of the Year	Ernest Certain	Defensive lineman	Tallahassee Thunder
Ironman of the Year	Kevin Harvey	Wide receiver/Defensive back	Richmond Speed
Lineman of the Year	Jamarr Ward	Lineman	Quad City Steamwheelers
Built Ford Tough Man of the Year	Ronnie Washburn	Lineman	Carolina Rhinos
Rookie of the Year	Matthew Sauk	Quarterback	Tennessee Valley Vipers
Coach of the Year	Bret Munsey	Head coach	Tennessee Valley Vipers
Executive of the Year	Art Clarkson	Owner	Tennessee Valley Vipers
Expansion Team of the Year	Macon Knights		

== ArenaCup II ==
ArenaCup II

Quarter	1	2	3	4	Tot
Richmond Speed	9	20	7	15	51
Quad City Steamwheelers	7	21	7	20	55

Date
August 10, 2001
Arena
The Mark of the Quad Cities
City
Moline, Illinois
Attendance
8,261
Most Valuable Player
Jay McDonagh
Ironman of the Game
Scott Hvistendahl
Winning Coach
Frank Haege
Losing Coach
Richard Davis

ArenaCup II was the 2001 edition of the AF2's championship game, in which the American Conference Champions Richmond Speed were defeated by the National Conference Champions Quad City Steamwheelers in Moline, Illinois by a score of 55 to 51.

Scoring summary

Quarter	Time	Drive			Team	Scoring information	Score	
Quarter	Time	Plays	Yards	TOP	Team	Scoring information	Richmond Speed	Quad City Steamwheelers
1	8:54	9	26	6:06	Richmond Speed	32-yard field goal by Geoff Groshelle	3	0
1	5:41	5	35	3:13	Quad City Steamwheelers	Jay McDonagh 1-yard touchdown run, Brion Hurley kick Good	3	7
1	2:18	4	15	3:23	Richmond Speed	Kevin Harvey 1-yard touchdown run, Geoff Groshelle kick Blocked	9	7
2	11:42	8	42	5:36	Quad City Steamwheelers	Jamarr Ward 7-yard touchdown run, Brion Hurley kick Good	9	14
2	7:45	6	32	3:57	Richmond Speed	George Williams 10-yard touchdown reception from Bob Bees, Geoff Groshelle kick Failed	15	14
2	6:33	1	45	1:12	Quad City Steamwheelers	Dennison Robinson 45-yard touchdown reception from Jay McDonagh, Brion Hurley kick Good	15	21
2	2:30	5	38	4:03	Richmond Speed	George Williams 16-yard touchdown reception from Bob Bees, Geoff Groshelle kick Good	22	21
2	0:27	5	33	2:03	Quad City Steamwheelers	Frank Carter 8-yard touchdown run, Brion Hurley kick Good	22	28
2	0:02	4	47	0:25	Richmond Speed	George Williams 16-yard touchdown reception from Bob Bees, Geoff Groshelle kick Good	29	28
3	13:47	2	36	1:13	Quad City Steamwheelers	Jeremy Wilkinson 29-yard touchdown reception from Jay McDonagh, Brion Hurley kick Good	29	35
3	4:22	4	37	1:56	Richmond Speed	Jeff Townsley 21-yard touchdown reception from Bob Bees, Geoff Groshelle kick Good	36	35
4	13:35	9	46	5:47	Quad City Steamwheelers	Jay McDonagh 2-yard touchdown run, Brion Hurley kick Failed	36	41
4	7:50	7	40	5:45	Richmond	Kevin Harvey 2-yard touchdown run, 2-point Jimmie Miles rush successful	44	41
4	3:44	5	33	4:06	Quad City Steamwheelers	Dennison Robinson 2-yard touchdown run, Brion Hurley kick Good	44	48
4	1:22	4	43	2:22	Richmond Speed	Kevin Harvey 13-yard touchdown reception from Bob Bees, Geoff Groshelle kick Good	51	48
4	0:10	6	32	1:12	Quad City Steamwheelers	Scott Hvistendahl 3-yard touchdown reception from Jay McDonagh, Brion Hurley kick Good	51	55
"TOP" = time of possession. For other American football terms, see Glossary of American football.							Richmond Speed	Quad City Steamwheelers
