= 2002 AF2 season =

- League: AF2
- Sport: Arena football

Regular season
- Season champions: Tulsa Talons

Playoffs
- American champions: Florida Firecats
- American runners-up: Cape Fear Wildcats
- National champions: Peoria Pirates
- National runners-up: Birmingham Steeldogs

ArenaCup III
- Champions: Peoria Pirates
- Runners-up: Florida Firecats

AF2 seasons
- ← 2001 2003 →

The 2002 AF2 season was the third season of the AF2. It was preceded by 2001 and succeeded by 2003. The league champions were the Peoria Pirates, who defeated the Florida Firecats in ArenaCup III. This is also the first time that both conferences have the same division name (in that case, the American Conference Southern Division and the National Conference Southern Division, respectively). It is also the only season where both conferences have four divisions each, a la the 2002–present era of the NFL.

== League info ==
New teams	Albany Conquest, Bakersfield Blitz, Cape Fear Wildcats, Fresno Frenzy, Hawaiian Islanders, Mobile Wizards, Mohegan Wolves, New Haven Ninjas, San Diego Riptide, Wilkes-Barre/Scranton Pioneers
Renamed / Relocated teams	None
Defunct teams	Baton Rouge Blaze, Iowa Barnstormers, Lafayette Roughnecks, Lincoln Lightning
Total teams	34

== Standings ==
Team	Overall			Division		
Team	Wins	Losses	Percentage	Wins	Losses	Percentage
American Conference
Atlantic Division
Cape Fear Wildcats	13	3	0.812	6	2	0.750
Richmond Speed	12	4	0.750	7	1	0.875
Norfolk Nighthawks	8	8	0.500	4	4	0.500
Roanoke Steam	8	8	0.500	3	5	0.375
Greensboro Prowlers	3	13	0.187	0	8	0.000
Northeast Division
Albany Conquest	13	3	0.812	11	1	0.917
Rochester Brigade	7	9	0.437	6	6	0.500
Wilkes-Barre/Scranton Pioneers	6	10	0.375	6	6	0.500
New Haven Ninjas	6	10	0.375	5	7	0.417
Mohegan Wolves	3	13	0.187	2	10	0.167
Eastern Division
Macon Knights	13	3	0.812	5	1	0.833
Augusta Stallions	13	3	0.812	5	1	0.833
Carolina Rhinos	5	11	0.312	1	5	0.167
Columbus Wardogs	4	12	0.250	1	5	0.167
Southern Division
Tallahassee Thunder	9	7	0.562	7	3	0.700
Florida Firecats	9	7	0.562	5	6	0.455
Jacksonville Tomcats	8	8	0.500	7	3	0.700
Charleston Swamp Foxes	7	9	0.437	2	4	0.333
National Conference
Southern Division
Tennessee Valley Vipers	13	3	0.812	5	1	0.833
Birmingham Steeldogs	11	5	0.687	5	2	0.714
Pensacola Barracudas	8	8	0.500	6	6	0.500
Mobile Wizards	0	16	0.000	0	12	0.000
Central Division
Tulsa Talons	14	2	0.875	4	2	0.667
Arkansas Twisters	11	5	0.687	4	2	0.667
Bossier City Battle Wings	9	7	0.562	3	3	0.500
Memphis Xplorers	5	11	0.312	1	5	0.167
Midwest Division
Peoria Pirates	11	5	0.687	6	0	1.000
Quad City Steamwheelers*	10	6	0.625	3	3	0.500
Wichita Stealth	6	10	0.375	3	3	0.500
Louisville Fire	2	14	0.125	0	6	0.000
Western Division
Bakersfield Blitz	9	7	0.562	7	2	0.778
San Diego Riptide	7	9	0.437	5	4	0.556
Hawaiian Islanders	5	11	0.312	4	5	0.444
Fresno Frenzy	4	12	0.250	2	7	0.222

- Green indicates clinched playoff berth
- Purple indicates division champion
- Grey indicates best regular season record

* The Steamwheelers were banned from the playoffs for rule violations.

== Playoffs ==
Division Championships	Conference Semifinals
2	Florida	43
1	Tallahassee	31
SD2	Florida	44
ED1	Macon	28
2	Augusta	41
1	Macon	57
American Conference
2	Rochester	26
1	Albany	31
ND1	Albany	30
AD1	Cape Fear	46
2	Richmond	48
1	Cape Fear	57
2	Birmingham	65
1	Tennessee Valley	51
SD2	Birmingham	53
CD1	Tulsa	34
2	Arkansas	32
1	Tulsa	34
National Conference
2	San Diego	40
1	Bakersfield	27
WD2	San Diego	12
MD1	Peoria	22
2	Wichita	36
1	Peoria	37

Conference Championships
SD2	Florida	43
AD1	Cape Fear	23
SD2	Birmingham	33
MD1	Peoria	79

ArenaCup III
AC7	Florida	47
NC3	Peoria	65

== Awards and honors ==
=== Regular season awards ===
Award	Winner	Position	Team
Offensive Player of the Year	Mitch Allner	Quarterback	Tulsa Talons
Defensive Player of the Year	Kelly Snell	Defensive Specialist	Tennessee Valley Vipers
Ironman of the Year	Kevin Harvey	Wide receiver/Defensive back	Richmond Speed
Lineman of the Year	E. J. Burt	Lineman	Cape Fear Wildcats
Built Ford Tough Man of the Year	Jeff Cogell	Lineman	Mohegan Wolves
Rookie of the Year	Lincoln Dupree	Defensive Specialist / Kick Returner	Peoria Pirates
Coach of the Year	Ron Selesky	Head coach	Albany Conquest

== ArenaCup III ==
III

Quarter	1	2	3	4	Tot
Florida Firecats	7	6	12	22	47
Peoria Pirates	6	17	13	29	65

Date
August 23, 2002
Arena
Carver Arena
City
Peoria, Illinois
Attendance
7,552
MVP
Cornell Craig
Offensive Player of the Game
Cornell Craig
Defensive Player of the Game
Lincoln Dupree
Ironman of the Game
Titcus Pettigrew
Winning Coach
Bruce Cowdrey
Losing Coach
John Fourcade

ArenaCup III was the 2002 edition of the AF2's championship game, in which the National Conference Champions Florida Firecats were defeated by the American Conference Champions Peoria Pirates in Peoria, Illinois by a score of 65 to 47.

=== Scoring Summary ===
Scoring summary

Quarter	Time	Drive			Team	Scoring information	Score	
Quarter	Time	Plays	Yards	TOP	Team	Scoring information	Florida Firecats	Peoria Pirates
1	10:34	2	38	1:45	Florida Firecats	Anthony Dixon 28-yard touchdown reception from Bryan Sparacino, Brandon Kornblue kick Good	7	0
1	5:23	7	31	5:11	Peoria Pirates	Cornell Craig 19-yard touchdown reception from Jerome Hurd, Kraig Baker kick Failed	7	6
2	9:37	7	39	4:08	Peoria Pirates	28-yard field goal by Kraig Baker	7	9
2	6:17	5	45	3:20	Florida Firecats	Dedric Maffet 3-yard touchdown run, Brandon Kornblue kick Failed	13	9
2	4:41	1	55	0	Peoria Pirates	Lincoln Dupree 55 yard Kickoff Return Touchdown, Kraig Baker PAT	13	16
2	0:20	1	26	0:08	Peoria Pirates	Cornell Craig 26-yard touchdown reception from Jerome Hurd, Kraig Baker kick Good	13	23
3	11:04	5	13	3:56	Florida Firecats	29-yard field goal by Brandon Kornblue	16	23
3	9:29	-	-	-	Florida Firecats	Interception returned 12 yards for touchdown by Anthony Dixon, Brandon Kornblue kick Good	23	23
3	8:51				Florida Firecats	Deryl Lynn Safety	25	23
3	6:59	2	9	1:04	Peoria Pirates	Jason Short 3-yard touchdown run, 2-point pass failed	25	29
3	1:44	3	45	1:42	Peoria Pirates	Brandon Campbell 22-yard touchdown reception from Walter Church, Kraig Baker kick Good	25	36
4	14:54				Peoria Pirates	Ken Bouie Safety	25	38
4	11:35	5	40	3:19	Peoria Pirates	Cornell Craig 5-yard touchdown reception from Walter Church, Kraig Baker kick Good	25	45
4	7:31	2	10	1:04	Peoria Pirates	Jason Short 4-yard touchdown run, Kraig Baker kick Good	25	52
4	4:14	4	45	3:17	Florida Firecats	Magic Benton 39-yard touchdown reception from Josh Rogers, 2-point rush succeeds	33	52
4	3:38				Peoria Pirates	Lincoln Dupree 10 yard kickoff return Touchdown, Kraig Baker PAT Blocked	33	58
4	2:30	1	31	1:08	Florida Firecats	Magic Benton 31-yard touchdown reception from Josh Rogers, 2-point Kevin Huntley pass from Josh Rogers succeeds	41	58
4	0:55	3	16	1:35	Peoria Pirates	Walter Church 12-yard touchdown run, Kraig Baker kick Good	41	65
4	0:25	5	30	0:30	Florida Firecats	Kevin Huntley 11-yard touchdown reception from Josh Rogers, 2-point pass from Josh Rogers fails	47	65
"TOP" = time of possession. For other American football terms, see Glossary of American football.							Florida Firecats	Peoria Pirates
