= Mike Buck (American football) =

American football player (born 1967)

No. 16
- Position: Quarterback

Personal information
- Born: April 22, 1967 (age 59); Long Island, New York, U.S.
- Listed height: 6 ft 3 in (1.91 m)
- Listed weight: 227 lb (103 kg)

Career information
- High school: Sayville (West Sayville, New York)
- College: Maine
- NFL draft: 1990: 6th round, 156th overall pick

Career history
- New Orleans Saints (1990–1993); Arizona Cardinals (1995); Miami Dolphins (1996)*
- * Offseason or practice squad member only

Career NFL statistics
- Passing attempts: 92
- Passing completions: 55
- Completion percentage: 59.8%
- TD–INT: 5–4
- Passing yards: 790
- Passer rating: 87.7
- Stats at Pro Football Reference

Michael Eric Buck (born April 22, 1967) is an American former professional football player who was a quarterback in the National Football League (NFL).

== Early life ==
He attended high school at Sayville, New York, and played college football at the University of Maine.

== Professional career ==
Mike Buck was a sixth round selection (156th overall pick) in the 1990 NFL draft by the New Orleans Saints. Buck made his NFL debut in 1991 playing for the New Orleans Saints. Buck would play for the Saints through the 1993 NFL season. Buck would later play for the Arizona Cardinals and Miami Dolphins of the NFL.

== Coaching career ==
Mike Buck coached the Pensacola Barracudas and Norfolk Nighthawks of af2, 2000–01.[Lubbock lonestars]

Mike is currently a teacher and coach for Walt Whitman High School in Huntington Station, New York. He is also the owner of a metal shingle roofing company that provides the greenest roofs in the business.(Forever Metal Shingles N.Y.)
