= Brent Petrus =

American football player (1975–2022)

No. 16
- Position: Quarterback

Personal information
- Born: March 30, 1975; Elyria, Ohio, U.S.
- Died: March 20, 2022 (aged 46); Elyria, Ohio, U.S.
- Listed height: 6 ft 4 in (1.93 m)
- Listed weight: 212 lb (96 kg)

Career information
- High school: Elyria Catholic
- College: Cincinnati (1994–1997)
- NFL draft: 1998: undrafted

Career history
- Carolina Rhinos (2000); New York Dragons (2001–2003); Grand Rapids Rampage (2004)

Career AFL statistics
- Comp. / Att.: 17 / 33
- Passing yards: 194
- TD–INT: 3–1
- Passer rating: 79.61
- Rushing TDs: 2
- Stats at ArenaFan.com

Brent Michael Petrus (March 30, 1975 – March 20, 2022) was an American professional football quarterback who played two seasons in the Arena Football League (AFL) with the New York Dragons and Grand Rapids Rampage. He played college football and basketball at the University of Cincinnati.

== Early life ==
Brent Petrus was born on March 30, 1975. He attended Elyria Catholic High School in Elyria, Ohio. He was a letterman in football, basketball, baseball and track. Petrus was a defensive back in football his junior year but moved to quarterback as a senior. He threw for over 1,000 yards as Elyria Catholic finished the 1992 season with a 9–3 record. In basketball, he averaged 22 points and 10 rebounds per game. He was also the baseball team's MVP during his sophomore and junior seasons. He did not play baseball his senior year, instead choosing to participate in track. Petrus graduated from Elyria Catholic in 1993. He was inducted into the Elyria Sports Hall of Fame in 2015.

== College career ==
Petrus played college football for the Cincinnati Bearcats of the University of Cincinnati from 1994 to 1997. He completed eight of 11 passes (72.7%) for 64 yards and one touchdown his freshman year in 1994. He recorded three completions on six passing attempts for 18 yards in 1995. In 1996, he completed nine of 24 passes (37.5%) for 220 yards and three touchdowns. Petrus converted to tight end his senior year in 1997, catching ten passes for 254 yards and one touchdown.

Petrus also played one year of college basketball for the Bearcats. During his lone season in 1997–98, he played in 31 games, starting four, as a guard and averaged 2.5 points and 2.2 rebounds per game.

== Professional career ==
Petrus was a member of the Carolina Rhinos of the af2 in 2000.

Petrus signed with the New York Dragons of the AFL on March 7, 2001, but was later released on April 16, 2001. He signed with the Dragons the next year on January 21, 2002, and was placed on injured reserve on May 2, 2002. Petrus was waived by the Dragons on January 26, 2003, but re-signed on March 26, 2003. He played in six games, starting two, during the 2003 season, completing 17 of 33 passes (51.5%) for 194 yards, three touchdowns, and one interception while scoring two rushing touchdowns as well.

Petrus was signed by the Grand Rapids Rampage of the AFL on February 26, 2004. He played in one game for the Rampage during the 2004 season without recording any statistics. He was waived on March 1, 2004.

== Personal life ==
Petrus was later a teacher and coach at Admiral King High School in Lorain, Ohio but had to quit due to health problems. He died on March 20, 2022, in Elyria, Ohio due to epilepsy.
