= Bret Munsey =

American football player and coach (born 1968)

Personal information
- Born: August 19, 1968 (age 58); Winter Park, Florida, U.S.

Career information
- High school: Winter Park
- College: Concord (1987–1990)

Career history

Playing
- Orlando Predators (1991–1995)

Coaching
- Concord (1991) Student assistant; Augusta Stallions (2000) Defensive coordinator; Tennessee Valley Vipers (2001) Head coach; Carolina Cobras (2002) Defensive coordinator; Orlando Predators (2003–2005) Secondary coach; Philadelphia Soul (2006–2008) Head coach; Orlando Predators (2012) Head coach; Washington Redskins (2014) Special projects; Washington Redskins (2015–2016) Special projects & assistant special teams coach; Washington Redskins (2017–2019) Assistant special teams coach

Operations
- Tennessee Valley Vipers (2001) Director of football operations; Orlando Predators (2003–2005) Director of player personnel; Florida Tuskers (2009–2010) Director of player personnel; Virginia Destroyers (2011) Director of player personnel; Philadelphia Eagles (2013) Scout

Awards and highlights
- ArenaBowl champion (2008)

Bret Munsey (born August 19, 1968) is an American former football coach, executive, and player. He was an assistant coach for the Washington Redskins of the National Football League. Previously, he was the head coach for the Orlando Predators and Philadelphia Soul of the Arena Football League (AFL), and also an executive for the Florida Tuskers and Virginia Destroyers of the United Football League, among other teams. He played college football as a wide receiver for Concord University, and played wide receiver and defensive back for the Orlando Predators.

== Playing career ==
=== College years ===
After graduating from Winter Park High School, Munsey played college football for Concord Mountain Lions football as a wide receiver, where he was a four-year starter and letterman. He led his team in receiving three of those years and was an All-West Virginia Intercollegiate Athletic Conference selection.

=== Arena Football League ===
Munsey played wide receiver and defensive back for the Orlando Predators from 1991 to 1995.

== Coaching career ==
Munsey began his coaching career as the defensive coordinator of the Augusta Stallions of af2 in 2000. He helped the Stallions to a 13–3 record and an American Conference Championship. In 2001, Munsey became the head coach and director of football operations for the Tennessee Valley Vipers of af2. He resigned after a highly successful 2001 season to become the defensive coordinator of the Carolina Cobras of the Arena Football League. Munsey led the Philadelphia Soul to the Arena Bowl Championship in 2008.

Munsey was named the head coach of the Orlando Predators on August 19, 2011. After the Predators went 4–14 in the 2012 season, missing the playoffs for the first time since 1991, Munsey was released by the team.

Munsey was hired on June 19, 2013, by the Philadelphia Eagles as a scout. In 2014, Munsey was hired by former AFL and UFL colleague Jay Gruden, the new head coach of the Washington Redskins, to join the Redskins coaching staff, working on special projects. His job title expanded to include assistant special teams coach starting in the 2015 season. In 2017, his job title was changed solely to assistant special teams coach, reflecting the departure of assistant special teams coach Bradford Banta. Munsey was not retained by new head coach Ron Rivera after the 2019 season in which the Redskins went 3–13 and saw a complete staff overhaul.
