= Aaron Sparrow =

American football player (born 1972)

Profile
- Position: Quarterback

Personal information
- Born: January 27, 1972 (age 54)
- Listed height: 6 ft 1 in (1.85 m)
- Listed weight: 200 lb (91 kg)

Career information
- High school: Woodrow Wilson (Portsmouth, Virginia)
- College: Norfolk State
- NFL draft: 1996: undrafted

Career history
- Calgary Stampeders (1996)*; Nashville Kats (1997); Grand Rapids Rampage (1998); Augusta Stallions (2000); Buffalo Destroyers (2001); Carolina Cobras (2002); Norfolk Nighthawks (2003); Wichita Stealth (2004)
- * Offseason or practice squad member only

Awards and highlights
- af2 Offensive Player of the Year (2000)

Career AFL statistics
- Comp. / Att.: 70 / 111
- Passing yards: 766
- TD–INT: 16–7
- QB rating: 93.15
- Rushing TDs: 1
- Stats at ArenaFan.com

Aaron Sparrow (born January 27, 1972) is an American former professional football quarterback who played three seasons in the Arena Football League (AFL) with the Nashville Kats, Grand Rapids Rampage and Carolina Cobras. He played college football at Norfolk State University. He was also a member of the Calgary Stampeders, Augusta Stallions, Buffalo Destroyers, Norfolk Nighthawks and Wichita Stealth.

== Early life ==
Sparrow played high school football at Woodrow Wilson High School in Portsmouth, Virginia. He was the All-Tidewater Player of the Year in 1989 and 1990. He also earned Parade All-American honors and helped the team win a state championship. Sparrow recorded career totals of 78 touchdown passes and 5,182 career passing yards.

== College career ==
Sparrow originally committed to play football for the Virginia Cavaliers but ended up transferring to Norfolk State University after failing to meet academic requirements.

Sparrow played for the Norfolk State Spartans from 1992 to 1995. He recorded 617 completions, 1,119 attempts, 8,758 passing yards and 79 TD passes in his college career. He was a 3-time All-CIAA selection, 1994 CIAA Offensive Player of the Year, 1995 CIAA Co-Offensive Player of the Year and a 2-time Division II All-American from 1994 to 1995. He was named to the Football Gazette Division II All-America Team as a junior in 1994, when he passed for 3,212 yards and 31 touchdowns while completing what was then a school record 59.8 percent of his passes. Sparrow was also named 1st team Football Gazette and 3rd Team AP All-American as a senior. He was inducted into the Norfolk State University Athletics Hall of Fame in 2009.

== Professional career ==
Sparrow signed with the Calgary Stampeders of the Canadian Football League (CFL) in May 1996. He was released by the team on June 11, 1996.

Sparrow appeared in two games for the Nashville Kats of the Arena Football League (AFL) in 1997. He had a tryout with the Toronto Argonauts of the CFL after the 1997 season.

Sparrow played in one game for the Grand Rapids Rampage of the AFL during the 1998 season, completing 13 of 16 passes for 171 yards and two touchdowns. He also threw an interception during the game and hurt his shoulder when he attempted to tackle the returner. He finished the game but could not throw a football when he woke up the next morning. Sparrow missed the rest of the 1998 and 1999 seasons rehabbing from surgery.

Sparrow played for the Augusta Stallions of the af2 in 2000, earning af2 Offensive Player of the Year honors after completing 335 of 513 of his passes for 4,000 yards and 78 touchdowns with a 122.94 passer rating. He also rushed for 54 yards and eleven touchdowns. He garnered First Team All-af2 recognition as well.

Sparrow was signed by the Buffalo Destroyers of the AFL in October 2000. He was placed on injured reserve on April 9, 2001. He was released by the Destroyers on July 20, 2001.

Sparrow signed with the Carolina Cobras of the AFL on November 27, 2001, recording fourteen touchdown passes on 595 yards during the 2002 Arena Football League season. He was released by the Cobras on November 2, 2002.

Sparrow played for the Norfolk Nighthawks of the af2 in 2003 and completed 239 of 395 passes for 3,006 yards and 51 touchdowns. During his time with the franchise, Sparrow was the oldest player on the roster.

Sparrow played for the Wichita Stealth of the af2 in 2004.

=== AFL statistics ===
| Year | Team | Passing | | | | | | | Rushing | | |
| Year | Team | Cmp | Att | Pct | Yds | TD | Int | Rtg | Att | Yds | TD |
|---|---|---|---|---|---|---|---|---|---|---|---|
| 1998 | Grand Rapids | 13 | 16 | 81.2 | 171 | 2 | 1 | 116.41 | 1 | 1 | 0 |
| 2002 | Carolina | 57 | 95 | 60.0 | 595 | 14 | 6 | 88.71 | 3 | 10 | 1 |
| Career | | 70 | 111 | 63.1 | 766 | 16 | 7 | 93.15 | 4 | 11 | 1 |
