= 2025 Butler Bulldogs football team =

American college football season

2025 Butler Bulldogs football
- Conference: Pioneer Football League
- Record: 6–6 (4–4 PFL)
- Head coach: Kevin Lynch (1st season)
- Offensive coordinator: Colin Johnson (1st season)
- Defensive coordinator: Jordan Belfiori (1st season)
- Home stadium: Bud and Jackie Sellick Bowl

2025 Pioneer Football League standings
	Conf.			Overall
Team	W		L	W		L
Drake $^	7	–	1	8	–	4
Presbyterian	6	–	2	10	–	2
San Diego	6	–	2	8	–	4
St. Thomas	5	–	3	7	–	5
Dayton	5	–	3	7	–	4
Morehead State	4	–	4	6	–	6
Butler	4	–	4	6	–	6
Marist	3	–	5	5	–	7
Stetson	2	–	6	3	–	9
Davidson	1	–	7	2	–	10
Valparaiso	1	–	7	2	–	10
$ – Conference champion; ^ – FCS playoff participant; Rankings from STATS Poll

The 2025 Butler Bulldogs football team represented Butler University as a member of the Pioneer Football League (PFL) during the 2025 NCAA Division I FCS football season. They were led by first-year head coach Kevin Lynch, who was hired after former coach Mike Uremovich left the program to become the head coach at Ball State. Lynch was assisted by first-year offensive coordinator Colin Johnson and first-year defensive coordinator Jordan Belfiori. The Bulldogs played their home games at the Bud and Jackie Sellick Bowl in Indianapolis, Indiana.

== Schedule ==
Date	Time	Opponent	Site	TV	Result	Attendance
August 30	2:00 pm	at Northern Iowa*	UNI-Dome; Cedar Falls, IA	ESPN+	L 14–38	9,079
September 6	1:00 pm	Truman*	Bud and Jackie Sellick Bowl; Indianapolis, IN	FloCollege	W 37–27	2,967
September 13	1:30 pm	at Hanover*	Alumni Stadium; Hanover, IN	Team 1 Sports	W 16–7	2,674
September 20	9:00 pm	at Weber State*	Stewart Stadium; Ogden, UT	ESPN+	L 24–38	6,393
September 27	1:00 pm	Marist^{†}	Bud and Jackie Sellick Bowl; Indianapolis, IN	FloCollege	W 31–28	4,167
October 4	2:00 pm	at St. Thomas	O'Shaughnessy Stadium; Saint Paul, MN	Midco Sports Plus	W 21–14 ^{OT}	5,274
October 11	1:00 pm	No. 24 Presbyterian	Bud and Jackie Sellick Bowl; Indianapolis, IN	FloCollege	L 25–31	3,682
October 18	12:00 pm	at Dayton	Welcome Stadium; Dayton, OH	YouTube	W 23–17	3,423
November 1	1:00 pm	Drake	Bud and Jackie Sellick Bowl; Indianapolis, IN	FloCollege	L 19–24	2,062
November 8	1:00 pm	at Morehead State	Phil Simms Stadium; Morehead, KY	ESPN+	L 30–31	4,108
November 15	4:00 pm	at San Diego	Torero Stadium; San Diego, CA	ESPN+	L 7–29	1,013
November 22	1:00 pm	Valparaiso	Bud and Jackie Sellick Bowl; Indianapolis, IN (Hoosier Helmet Trophy)	FloCollege	W 27–20	1,938
*Non-conference game; ^{†}Homecoming; Rankings from STATS Poll released prior to the game; All times are in Eastern time

== Game summaries ==
=== at Northern Iowa ===
Butler Bulldogs (0-0) at Northern Iowa Panthers (0-0) – Game summary

Quarter	1	2	3	4	Total
Bulldogs	7	7	0	0	14
Panthers	10	7	14	7	38

at UNI Dome • Cedar Falls, IA

- Date: Saturday, August 30, 2025
- Game time: 2:00 p.m. EDT
- Game weather: N/A (Indoors)
- Game attendance: 9,079
- Referee: David Hergert
- TV announcers (ESPN+): Brad Wells (play-by-play) & Justin Surrency (analyst)
- Box Score

Game information

First quarter

- (7:20) UNI – Derek Anderson 6-yard pass from Matthew Schecklman, Max Bartachek kick (Drive: 3 plays, 24 yards, 1:10; Northern Iowa 7–0)
- (2:22) BUT – Nick Munson 4-yard pass from Reagan Andrew, Beck Janki kick (Drive: 10 plays, 75 yards, 4:58; Tied 7–7)
- (0:09) UNI – Max Bartachek 36-yard field goal (Drive: 5 plays, 54 yards, 2:06; Northern Iowa 10–7)

Second quarter

- (9:55) BUT – Reagan Andrew 9-yard run, Beck Janki kick (Drive: 11 plays, 78 yards, 5:09; Butler 14–10)
- (5:13) UNI – Harrison Bey-Buie 1-yard run, Max Bartachek kick (Drive: 10 plays, 80 yards, 4:36; Northern Iowa 17–14)

Third quarter

- (9:51) UNI – Tysen Kershaw 16-yard pass from Matthew Schecklman, Max Bartachek kick (Drive: 9 plays, 77 yards, 5:03; Northern Iowa 24–14)
- (1:03) UNI – JC Roque Jr. 26-yard pass from Matthew Schecklman, Max Bartachek kick (Drive: 9 plays, 85 yards, 3:58; Northern Iowa 31–14)

Fourth quarter

- (12:24) UNI – Ayden Price 25-yard pass from Matthew Schecklman, Max Bartachek kick (Drive: 5 plays, 61 yards, 2:25; Northern Iowa 38–14)

Statistics	BUT	UNI
First downs	19	25
Total yards	336	448
Rushing yards	147	213
Passing yards	189	235
Passing: Comp–Att–Int	22–36–2	17–28–0
Time of possession	31:43	28:17

Team	Category	Player	Statistics
Butler	Passing	Reagan Andrew	22/36, 189 yards, TD, 2 INT
Butler	Rushing	Reagan Andrew	15 carries, 75 yards, TD
Butler	Receiving	Ethan Loss	8 receptions, 81 yards
Northern Iowa	Passing	Matthew Schecklman	15/25, 214 yards, 4 TD
Northern Iowa	Rushing	Harrison Bey-Buie	12 carries, 81 yards, TD
Northern Iowa	Receiving	Tysen Kershaw	2 receptions, 65 yards, TD

=== Truman (DII) ===
Truman Bulldogs (DII) (0-1) at Butler Bulldogs (0-1) – Game summary

Quarter	1	2	3	4	Total
Truman (DII)	0	7	20	0	27
Butler	7	14	9	7	37

at Bud and Jackie Sellick Bowl • Indianapolis, IN

- Date: Saturday, September 6, 2025
- Game time: 1:00 PM EDT
- Game weather: Sunny • Temperature: 72 °F (22 °C)
- Game attendance: 2,967
- Referee: Kyle Harbour
- TV: FloCollege
- Box Score

Game information

First Quarter

- (5:36) BUT – Reagan Andrew 5-yard run, Beck Janki kick (Drive: 10 plays, 86 yards, 5:35; Butler 7–0)

Second Quarter

- (8:43) BUT – Reagan Andrew 9-yard run, Beck Janki kick (Drive: 15 plays, 80 yards, 8:39; Butler 14–0)
- (6:15) TRUM – Jack Butchko 43-yard pass from Dylan Hair, Vinnie Calvaruso kick (Drive: 5 plays, 90 yards, 2:16; Butler 14–7)
- (0:22) BUT – Brady Preston 7-yard pass from Reagan Andrew, Beck Janki kick (Drive: 13 plays, 75 yards, 5:53; Butler 21–7)

Third Quarter

- (12:16) BUT – Ershod Jasey II 7-yard pass from Reagan Andrew, Beck Janki kick (Drive: 6 plays, 64 yards, 2:39; Butler 28–7)
- (8:09) TRUM – Nathan Ryan 40-yard pass from Dylan Hair, Vinnie Calvaruso kick blocked (Drive: 1 play, 40 yards, 0:08; Butler 28–13)
- (5:22) TRUM – Denim Cook 13-yard run, Jalen Kent pass from Dylan Hair (Drive: 2 plays, 8 yards, 0:30; Butler 28–21)
- (0:14) TRUM – Nathan Ryan 22-yard pass from Dylan Hair, Vinnie Calvaruso kick blocked (Drive: 6 plays, 64 yards, 2:51; Butler 28–27)
- (0:14) BUT – Will Mason 95-yard return of blocked PAT (Butler 30–27)

Fourth Quarter

- (9:08) BUT – Ethan Malafa 24-yard pass from Griffin Caldwell, Beck Janki kick (Drive: 11 plays, 75 yards, 6:06; Butler 37–27)

Statistics	TRUM	BUT
First downs	16	25
Total yards	352	421
Rushing yards	131	179
Passing yards	221	242
Passing: Comp–Att–Int	14–31–0	23–28–0
Time of possession	19:50	40:10

Team	Category	Player	Statistics
Truman	Passing	Dylan Hair	14/31, 221 yards, 3 TD
Truman	Rushing	Denim Cook	9 carries, 57 yards, TD
Truman	Receiving	Nathan Ryan	3 receptions, 92 yards, 2 TD
Butler	Passing	Reagan Andrew	14/17, 156 yards, 2 TD
Butler	Rushing	Griffin Caldwell	16 carries, 55 yards
Butler	Receiving	Ethan Loss	8 receptions, 106 yards

=== at Hanover (DIII) ===
Butler Bulldogs (1-1) at Hanover Panthers (DIII) (0-1) – Game summary

Quarter	1	2	3	4	Total
Bulldogs	3	7	6	0	16
Panthers (DIII)	7	0	0	0	7

at Alumni Field • Hanover, IN

- Date: Saturday, September 13, 2025
- Game time: 1:30 PM EDT
- Game weather: Sunny • Temperature: 87 °F (31 °C)
- Game attendance: 2,674
- Referee: Jim Lytle
- TV announcers (Team 1 Sports): Larry Duke (play-by-play) & Malachi Parks (analyst)
- Box Score

Game information

First Quarter

- (11:58) HAN – Curbrian Shelby 27-yard pass from Eian Roudebush, Clint Hearne kick (Drive: 3 plays, 32 yards, 1:18; Hanover 7–0)
- (3:51) BUT – Ryan Short 21-yard field goal (Drive: 14 plays, 74 yards, 8:03; Hanover 7–3)

Second Quarter

- (3:04) BUT – Gabe Passini 10-yard run, Ryan Short kick (Drive: 12 plays, 74 yards, 6:46; Butler 10–7)

Third Quarter

- (14:47) BUT – Ethan Loss 90-yard kickoff return, Ryan Short kick blocked (Butler 16–7)

Fourth Quarter

No scoring plays

Statistics	BUT	HAN
First downs	17	12
Total yards	330	158
Rushing yards	152	49
Passing yards	178	109
Passing: Comp–Att–Int	17–23–1	17–26–0
Time of possession	32:53	27:07

Team	Category	Player	Statistics
Butler	Passing	Jarrin Alley	17/23, 178 yards, INT
Butler	Rushing	Gabe Passini	10 carries, 55 yards, TD
Butler	Receiving	Ethan Loss	4 receptions, 68 yards
Hanover	Passing	Eian Roudebush	17/26, 109 yards, TD
Hanover	Rushing	Don Dunning	11 carries, 60 yards
Hanover	Receiving	Curbrian Shelby	3 receptions, 59 yards, TD

=== at Weber State ===
Butler Bulldogs (2–1) at Weber State Wildcats (1–2) – Game summary

Quarter	1	2	3	4	Total
Bulldogs	0	17	0	7	24
Wildcats	13	14	3	8	38

at Stewart Stadium • Ogden, UT

- Date: Saturday, September 20, 2025
- Game time: 9:00 p.m. EDT
- Game weather: Sunny • Temperature: 72 °F (22 °C) • Wind: W at 5 miles per hour (8.0 km/h)
- Game attendance: 6,393
- Referee: Jim Crowley
- TV announcers (ESPN+): Mike Folta (play-by-play) & Riley Jensen (analyst)
- Box Score

Game information

First quarter

- (12:38) WEB – Davion Godley 15-yard run, Sloan Calder kick (Drive: 5 plays, 75 yards, 2:22; Weber State 7–0)
- (5:51) WEB – Sloan Calder 29-yard field goal (Drive: 5 plays, 19 yards, 1:59; Weber State 10–0)
- (0:38) WEB – Sloan Calder 26-yard field goal (Drive: 7 plays, 23 yards, 3:40; Weber State 13–0)

Second quarter

- (10:47) BUT – Ethan Loss 2-yard run, Ryan Short kick (Drive: 10 plays, 75 yards, 4:51; Weber State 13–7)
- (8:54) WEB – AJ Jayroe 20-yard pass from Jackson Gilkey, Sloan Calder kick (Drive: 6 plays, 75 yards, 1:53; Weber State 20–7)
- (4:46) WEB – Ammon Munyer 20-yard pass from Jackson Gilkey, Sloan Calder kick (Drive: 6 plays, 75 yards, 2:11; Weber State 27–7)
- (4:01) BUT – Brady Preston 32-yard pass from Gabe Passini, Ryan Short kick (Drive: 2 plays, 75 yards, 0:45; Weber State 27–14)
- (2:00) BUT – Ryan Short 28-yard field goal (Drive: 4 plays, 2 yards, 0:54; Weber State 27–17)

Third quarter

- (6:44) WEB – Sloan Calder 36-yard field goal (Drive: 6 plays, 16 yards, 2:47; Weber State 30–17)

Fourth quarter

- (14:55) BUT – Gabe Passini 12-yard run, Ryan Short kick (Drive: 5 plays, 65 yards, 2:36; Weber State 30–24)
- (2:54) WEB – Chauncey Sylvester 3-yard run, Marvin Session pass from Jackson Gilkey (Drive: 4 plays, 64 yards, 2:19; Weber State 38–24)

Statistics	BUT	WEB
First downs	13	21
Plays–yards	62–248	66–442
Rushes–yards	37–185	41–257
Passing yards	63	185
Passing: Comp–Att–Int	8–25–1	14–25–2
Turnovers	1	3
Time of possession	28:44	31:16

Team	Category	Player	Statistics
Butler	Passing	Gabe Passini	5/9, 51 yards, TD
Butler	Rushing	Gabe Passini	23 carries, 175 yards, TD
Butler	Receiving	Brady Preston	1 reception, 32 yards, TD
Weber State	Passing	Jackson Gilkey	14/25, 185 yards, 2 TD, 2 INT
Weber State	Rushing	Davion Godley	19 carries, 193 yards, TD
Weber State	Receiving	Marvin Session	4 receptions, 63 yards

=== Marist ===
Marist Red Foxes (2-1) at Butler Bulldogs (2-2) – Game summary

Quarter	1	2	3	4	Total
Red Foxes	0	7	7	14	28
Bulldogs	7	7	3	14	31

at Bud and Jackie Sellick Bowl • Indianapolis, IN

- Date: Saturday, September 27, 2025
- Game time: 1:00 p.m. EDT
- Game weather: Sunny • Temperature: 82 °F (28 °C) • Wind: NW at 3 miles per hour (4.8 km/h)
- Game attendance: 4,167
- Referee: Tyler Downs
- TV announcers (FloCollege): Greg Rakestraw (play-by-play) & Andrew Mild (analyst)
- Box Score

Game information

First Quarter

- (1:24) BUT – Cameron Heald 6-yard pass from Reagan Andrew, Ryan Short kick (Drive: 3 plays, 6 yards, 1:23; Butler 7–0)

Second Quarter

- (12:31) MRST – Matt Bonczek 40-yard fumble return, Samer Layous kick (Tied 7–7)
- (4:28) BUT – Griffin Caldwell 56-yard run, Ryan Short kick (Drive: 7 plays, 91 yards, 3:58; Butler 14–7)

Third Quarter

- (10:02) BUT – Ryan Short 26-yard field goal (Drive: 7 plays, 25 yards, 3:30; Butler 17–7)
- (1:40) MRST – Connor Hulstein 17-yard pass from Patrick Grusser, Samer Layous kick (Drive: 9 plays, 81 yards, 2:52; Butler 17–14)

Fourth Quarter

- (13:20) MRST – Devin Kennedy 27-yard pass from Sonny Mannino, Samer Layous kick (Drive: 4 plays, 35 yards, 1:34; Marist 21–17)
- (9:49) BUT – Brady Preston 1-yard pass from Reagan Andrew, Ryan Short kick (Drive: 6 plays, 74 yards, 3:25; Butler 24–21)
- (3:11) MRST – Lance Martinez 35-yard pass from Sonny Mannino, Samer Layous kick (Drive: 4 plays, 40 yards, 1:21; Marist 28–24)
- (1:47) BUT – Archie Cox 48-yard pass from Reagan Andrew, Ryan Short kick (Drive: 5 plays, 69 yards, 1:19; Butler 31–28)

Statistics	MRST	BUT
First downs	13	15
Total yards	240	376
Rushing yards	21	225
Passing yards	219	151
Passing: Comp–Att–Int	26–38–1	17–27–0
Time of possession	26:22	33:38

Team	Category	Player	Statistics
Marist	Passing	Sonny Mannino	23/35, 178 yards, 2 TD, INT
Marist	Rushing	Carter James	6 carries, 18 yards
Marist	Receiving	Connor Hulstein	4 receptions, 58 yards, TD
Butler	Passing	Reagan Andrew	17/27, 151 yards, 3 TD
Butler	Rushing	Reagan Andrew	14 carries, 57 yards
Butler	Receiving	Ethan Loss	5 receptions, 59 yards

=== at St. Thomas (MN) ===
Butler Bulldogs (3-2) at St. Thomas Tommies (2-2) – Game summary

Quarter	1	2	3	4	OT	Total
Bulldogs	7	7	0	0	7	21
Tommies	7	0	0	7	0	14

at O'Shaughnessy Stadium • Saint Paul, MN

- Date: Saturday, October 4, 2025
- Game time: 2:00 p.m. EDT
- Game weather: Sunny • Temperature: 84 °F (29 °C) • Wind: N at 16 miles per hour (26 km/h)
- Game attendance: 5,274
- TV announcers (Midco Sports Plus): Corbu Stathes (play-by-play), Chris Ohm (analyst) and Allie Mosley (sideline)
- Box Score

Game information

First Quarter

- (8:26) STMN – Quentin Cobb-Butler 29-yard pass from Andy Peters, Ben Hoiland kick (Drive: 11 plays, 75 yards, 6:34; St. Thomas 7–0)
- (3:16) BUT – Reagan Andrew 2-yard run, Ryan Short kick (Drive: 8 plays, 70 yards, 5:06; Tied 7–7)

Second Quarter

- (2:20) BUT – Reagan Andrew 1-yard run, Ryan Short kick (Drive: 15 plays, 80 yards, 8:51; Butler 14–7)

Third Quarter

No scoring plays

Fourth Quarter

- (10:10) STMN – Andy Peters 1-yard run, Ben Hoiland kick (Drive: 13 plays, 51 yards, 6:32; Tied 14–14)

Overtime

- BUT – Reagan Andrew 1-yard run, Ryan Short kick (Drive: 5 plays, 25 yards; Butler 21–14)

Statistics	BUT	STMN
First downs	20	22
Total yards	286	306
Rushing yards	129	113
Passing yards	157	193
Passing: Comp–Att–Int	17–22–0	16–27–2
Time of possession	32:34	27:26

Team	Category	Player	Statistics
Butler	Passing	Reagan Andrew	16/21, 141 yards
Butler	Rushing	Reagan Andrew	26 carries, 68 yards, 3 TD
Butler	Receiving	Nick Munson	4 receptions, 44 yards
St. Thomas (MN)	Passing	Andy Peters	16/27, 193 yards, TD, 2 INT
St. Thomas (MN)	Rushing	Pat Bowen	12 carries, 61 yards
St. Thomas (MN)	Receiving	Quentin Cobb-Butler	6 receptions, 69 yards, TD

=== No. 24 Presbyterian ===
No. 24 Presbyterian Blue Hose (5-0) at Butler Bulldogs (4-2) – Game summary

Quarter	1	2	3	4	Total
No. 24 Blue Hose	15	3	0	13	31
Bulldogs	7	9	3	6	25

at Bud and Jackie Sellick Bowl • Indianapolis, IN

- Date: Saturday, October 11, 2025
- Game time: 1:00 p.m. EDT
- Game weather: Sunny • Temperature: 71 °F (22 °C)
- Game attendance: 3,682
- Referee: Grant Henderson
- TV announcers (FloCollege): Greg Rakestraw (play-by-play) and Andrew Mild (analyst)
- Box Score

Game information

First Quarter

- (13:22) PRES – Cincere Gill 14-yard pass from Collin Hurst, Justin Montgomery rush (Drive: 4 plays, 75 yards, 1:38; Presbyterian 8–0)
- (2:45) BUT – Reagan Andrew 9-yard run, Ryan Short kick (Drive: 15 plays, 89 yards, 7:54; Presbyterian 8–7)
- (0:00) PRES – Zach Switzer 8-yard run, Dixon Musgrove kick (Drive: 7 plays, 75 yards, 2:45; Presbyterian 15–7)

Second Quarter

- (7:39) BUT – Ryan Short 33-yard field goal (Drive: 13 plays, 60 yards, 7:21; Presbyterian 15–10)
- (3:08) PRES – Jett Jackson 38-yard field goal (Drive: 10 plays, 54 yards, 4:31; Presbyterian 18–10)
- (0:39) BUT – Griffin Caldwell 14-yard run, Ryan Short kick blocked (Drive: 2 plays, 20 yards, 0:26; Presbyterian 18–16)

Third Quarter

- (5:17) BUT – Ryan Short 25-yard field goal (Drive: 18 plays, 67 yards, 9:43; Butler 19–18)

Fourth Quarter

- (11:11) BUT – Ryan Short 37-yard field goal (Drive: 10 plays, 57 yards, 4:41; Butler 22–18)
- (11:00) PRES – Nathan Levicki 75-yard pass from Collin Hurst, Dixon Musgrove kick failed (Drive: 1 play, 75 yards, 0:11; Presbyterian 24–22)
- (1:00) PRES – Zach Switzer 3-yard run, Dixon Musgrove kick (Drive: 11 plays, 75 yards, 4:35; Presbyterian 31–22)
- (0:10) BUT – Ryan Short 41-yard field goal (Drive: 9 plays, 45 yards, 0:45; Presbyterian 31–25)

Statistics	PRES	BUT
First downs	16	26
Total yards	385	388
Rushing yards	210	193
Passing yards	175	195
Passing: Comp–Att–Int	12–16–0	20–34–0
Time of possession	19:37	40:23

Team	Category	Player	Statistics
Presbyterian	Passing	Collin Hurst	12/16, 175 yards, 2 TD
Presbyterian	Rushing	Justin Montgomery	10 carries, 134 yards
Presbyterian	Receiving	Nathan Levicki	2 receptions, 82 yards, TD
Butler	Passing	Reagan Andrew	20/33, 195 yards
Butler	Rushing	Reagan Andrew	31 carries, 115 yards, TD
Butler	Receiving	Nick Munson	5 receptions, 59 yards

=== at Dayton ===
Butler Bulldogs (4-3) at Dayton Flyers (5-1) – Game summary

Quarter	1	2	3	4	Total
Bulldogs	7	10	3	3	23
Flyers	0	7	7	3	17

at Welcome Stadium • Dayton, OH

- Date: Saturday, October 18, 2025
- Game time: 12:00 p.m. EDT
- Game weather: Sunny • Temperature: 72 °F (22 °C) • Wind: SW at 10 miles per hour (16 km/h)
- Game attendance: 3,423
- Referee: Carl Chatman
- TV announcers (YouTube): Luke West Poley (play-by-play) and Josh Copeland (analyst)
- Box Score

Game information

First Quarter

- (1:49) BUT – Ethan Loss 67-yard pass from Reagan Andrew, Ryan Short kick (Drive: 9 plays, 93 yards, 5:21; Butler 7–0)

Second Quarter

- (11:33) DAY – Gavin Lochow 20-yard pass from Bryce Schondelmyer, Robby Smart kick (Drive: 11 plays, 73 yards, 5:11; Tied 7–7)
- (3:32) BUT – Archie Cox 16-yard pass from Reagan Andrew, Ryan Short kick (Drive: 13 plays, 80 yards, 7:54; Butler 14–7)
- (0:00) BUT – Ryan Short 41-yard field goal (Drive: 9 plays, 43 yards, 0:57; Butler 17–7)

Third Quarter

- (4:41) DAY – Donovan Weatherly 4-yard pass from Drew VanVleet, Trevor Henkle kick (Drive: 13 plays, 86 yards, 7:09; Butler 17–14)
- (1:14) BUT – Ryan Short 29-yard field goal (Drive: 6 plays, 64 yards, 3:27; Butler 20–14)

Fourth Quarter

- (2:56) BUT – Ryan Short 26-yard field goal (Drive: 16 plays, 87 yards, 9:04; Butler 23–14)
- (0:52) DAY – Trevor Henkle 34-yard field goal (Drive: 11 plays, 53 yards, 1:58; Butler 23–17)

Statistics	BUT	DAY
First downs	16	15
Total yards	360	298
Rushing yards	104	142
Passing yards	256	156
Passing: Comp–Att–Int	18–23–0	16–30–0
Time of possession	33:29	26:31

Team	Category	Player	Statistics
Butler	Passing	Reagan Andrew	18/23, 256 yards, 2 TD
Butler	Rushing	Reagan Andrew	20 carries, 78 yards
Butler	Receiving	Ethan Loss	3 receptions, 93 yards, TD
Dayton	Passing	Drew VanVleet	7/16, 79 yards, TD
Dayton	Rushing	Luke Hansen	15 carries, 105 yards
Dayton	Receiving	Gavin Lochow	8 receptions, 54 yards, TD

=== Drake ===
Drake Bulldogs (5-2) at Butler Bulldogs (5-3) – Game summary

Quarter	1	2	3	4	Total
Drake	7	7	3	7	24
Butler	7	0	6	6	19

at Bud and Jackie Sellick Bowl • Indianapolis, IN

- Date: Saturday, November 1, 2025
- Game time: 1:00 p.m. EDT
- Game weather: Sunny • Temperature: 51 °F (11 °C)
- Game attendance: 2,062
- Referee: Jason Berg
- TV: FloCollege
- Box Score

Game information

First Quarter

- (14:44) DRKE – Nick Herman 66-yard run, Harry Balke kick (Drive: 1 play, 66 yards, 0:10; Drake 7–0)
- (7:08) BUT – Archie Cox 54-yard pass from Reagan Andrew, Ryan Short kick (Drive: 3 plays, 80 yards, 1:24; Tied 7–7)

Second Quarter

- (2:35) DRKE – Jackson Voth 11-yard pass from Logan Inagawa, Harry Balke kick (Drive: 11 plays, 96 yards, 6:11; Drake 14–7)

Third Quarter

- (9:38) BUT – Chet Yardley 3-yard pass from Reagan Andrew, Ryan Short kick blocked (Drive: 9 plays, 75 yards, 5:22; Drake 14–13)
- (6:01) DRKE – Harry Balke 51-yard field goal (Drive: 7 plays, 31 yards, 3:34; Drake 17–13)

Fourth Quarter

- (10:52) DRKE – Luke Woodson 1-yard run, Harry Balke kick (Drive: 8 plays, 34 yards, 4:01; Drake 24–13)
- (7:10) BUT – Reagan Andrew 3-yard run, two-point conversion failed (Drive: 7 plays, 73 yards, 3:38; Drake 24–19)

Statistics	DRKE	BUT
First downs	16	16
Total yards	363	353
Rushing yards	119	162
Passing yards	244	191
Passing: Comp–Att–Int	18–24–0	14–21–1
Time of possession	35:04	24:56

Team	Category	Player	Statistics
Drake	Passing	Logan Inagawa	18/23, 244 yards, TD
Drake	Rushing	Nick Herman	19 carries, 113 yards, TD
Drake	Receiving	Taj Hughes	7 receptions, 104 yards
Butler	Passing	Reagan Andrew	14/21, 191 yards, 2 TD, INT
Butler	Rushing	Ethan Loss	4 carries, 57 yards
Butler	Receiving	Archie Cox	4 receptions, 107 yards, TD

=== at Morehead State ===
Butler Bulldogs (5-4) at Morehead State Eagles (5-5) – Game summary

Quarter	1	2	3	4	Total
Bulldogs	14	10	3	3	30
Eagles	7	10	7	7	31

at Phil Simms Stadium • Morehead, KY

- Date: Saturday, November 8, 2025
- Game time: 1:00 p.m. EST
- Game weather: Sunny • Temperature: 62 °F (17 °C) • Wind: W at 10 miles per hour (16 km/h)
- Game attendance: 4,108
- Referee: Bradley Eiras
- TV announcers (ESPN+): Jared Stacy (play-by-play) and Mark Ledford (analyst)
- Box Score

Game information

First Quarter

- (10:08) MORE – Isaac Stopke 4-yard run, Jordan Price kick (Drive: 9 plays, 77 yards, 4:46; Morehead State 7–0)
- (9:52) BUT – Ethan Loss 100-yard kickoff return, Ryan Short kick (Tied 7–7)
- (2:22) BUT – Charlie Spegal 1-yard run, Ryan Short kick (Drive: 11 plays, 74 yards, 5:36; Butler 14–7)

Second Quarter

- (12:56) MORE – Thomas Schwartz V 33-yard field goal (Drive: 9 plays, 57 yards, 4:19; Butler 14–10)
- (6:40) BUT – Ethan Loss 2-yard run, Ryan Short kick (Drive: 5 plays, 57 yards, 1:52; Butler 21–10)
- (5:38) MORE – Ryan Upp 57-yard pass from Carter Cravens, Jordan Price kick (Drive: 2 plays, 65 yards, 0:50; Butler 21–17)
- (0:00) BUT – Ryan Short 45-yard field goal (Drive: 10 plays, 52 yards, 1:53; Butler 24–17)

Third Quarter

- (11:34) MORE – Jackson Lanier 3-yard run, Jordan Price kick (Drive: 4 plays, 32 yards, 1:11; Tied 24–24)
- (0:06) BUT – Ryan Short 44-yard field goal (Drive: 12 plays, 21 yards, 6:48; Butler 27–24)

Fourth Quarter

- (3:33) BUT – Ryan Short 43-yard field goal (Drive: 12 plays, 53 yards, 7:23; Butler 30–24)
- (0:52) MORE – Ryan Upp 7-yard pass from Carter Cravens, Jordan Price kick (Drive: 14 plays, 75 yards, 2:41; Morehead State 31–30)

Statistics	BUT	MORE
First downs	22	20
Total yards	330	344
Rushing yards	195	46
Passing yards	135	298
Passing: Comp–Att–Int	17–27–2	23–31–0
Time of possession	34:24	25:36

Team	Category	Player	Statistics
Butler	Passing	Reagan Andrew	13/20, 103 yards, 2 INT
Butler	Rushing	Reagan Andrew	16 carries, 74 yards
Butler	Receiving	Ethan Loss	7 receptions, 72 yards
Morehead State	Passing	Carter Cravens	23/31, 298 yards, 2 TD
Morehead State	Rushing	Isaac Stopke	8 carries, 37 yards
Morehead State	Receiving	Ryan Upp	9 receptions, 154 yards, 2 TD

=== at San Diego ===
Butler Bulldogs (5-5) at San Diego Toreros (6-4) – Game summary

Quarter	1	2	3	4	Total
Bulldogs	0	0	7	0	7
Toreros	0	3	3	23	29

at Torero Stadium • San Diego, CA

- Date: Saturday, November 15, 2025
- Game time: 4:00 p.m. EST
- Game weather: Rainy
- Game attendance: 1,013
- Referee: Michael Frain
- TV announcers (ESPN+): Jack Cronin (play-by-play) and George Whitfield Jr. (analyst)
- Box Score

Game information

First Quarter

No scoring plays

Second Quarter

- (0:35) USD – Emiliano Salazar 35-yard field goal (Drive: 9 plays, 58 yards, 3:43; San Diego 3–0)

Third Quarter

- (4:39) USD – Emiliano Salazar 32-yard field goal (Drive: 5 plays, 41 yards, 2:31; San Diego 6–0)
- (0:12) BUT – Brady Preston 10-yard pass from Reagan Andrew, Ryan Short kick (Drive: 9 plays, 64 yards, 4:20; Butler 7–6)

Fourth Quarter

- (10:58) USD – Ryan Short safety (San Diego 8–7)
- (8:08) USD – Matt Colombo 8-yard run, Emiliano Salazar kick (Drive: 5 plays, 58 yards, 2:43; San Diego 15–7)
- (6:35) USD – Josh Heverly 43-yard pass from Dom Nankil, Emiliano Salazar kick (Drive: 3 plays, 45 yards, 0:43; San Diego 22–7)
- (0:31) USD – Adam Criter 4-yard run, Emiliano Salazar kick (Drive: 8 plays, 34 yards, 3:59; San Diego 29–7)

Statistics	BUT	USD
First downs	15	15
Total yards	216	383
Rushing yards	75	165
Passing yards	141	218
Passing: Comp–Att–Int	15–23–1	9–17–1
Time of possession	32:53	27:07

Team	Category	Player	Statistics
Butler	Passing	Reagan Andrew	15/23, 141 yards, TD, INT
Butler	Rushing	Reagan Andrew	15 carries, 49 yards
Butler	Receiving	Brady Preston	2 receptions, 34 yards, TD
San Diego	Passing	Dom Nankil	9/17, 218 yards, TD, INT
San Diego	Rushing	Matt Colombo	21 carries, 113 yards, TD
San Diego	Receiving	Cole Monach	4 receptions, 119 yards

=== Valparaiso (Hoosier Helmet Trophy) ===
Valparaiso Beacons (2-9) at Butler Bulldogs (5-6) – Game summary

Quarter	1	2	3	4	Total
Beacons	7	0	0	13	20
Bulldogs	7	20	0	0	27

at Bud and Jackie Sellick Bowl • Indianapolis, IN

- Date: Saturday, November 22, 2025
- Game time: 1:00 PM EST
- Game weather: Sunny • Temperature: 50 °F (10 °C)
- Game attendance: 1,938
- Referee: Gregory Gompf
- TV announcers (FloCollege): Jack Barry (play-by-play) and Drew Pieschalski (analyst)
- Box Score

Game information

First Quarter

- (10:56) BUT – Griffin Caldwell 8-yard pass from Reagan Andrew, Ryan Short kick (Drive: 7 plays, 65 yards, 4:04; Butler 7–0)
- (7:29) VAL – Ryan Ricketti 4-yard pass from Rowan Keefe, Luke Scoma kick (Drive: 5 plays, 97 yards, 3:07; Tied 7–7)

Second Quarter

- (9:16) BUT – Gabe Passini 4-yard run, Ryan Short kick (Drive: 4 plays, 35 yards, 1:58; Butler 14–7)
- (7:35) BUT – Ryan Short 25-yard field goal (Drive: 4 plays, 3 yards, 1:28; Butler 17–7)
- (3:43) BUT – Ershod Jasey II 49-yard pass from Gabe Passini, Ryan Short kick (Drive: 3 plays, 97 yards, 1:38; Butler 24–7)
- (0:18) BUT – Ryan Short 32-yard field goal (Drive: 10 plays, 46 yards, 2:08; Butler 27–7)

Third Quarter

No scoring plays

Fourth Quarter

- (12:01) VAL – Devin Yeats 13-yard pass from Rowan Keefe, Liam Shepherd kick blocked (Drive: 12 plays, 99 yards, 5:09; Butler 27–13)
- (3:07) VAL – Colin Hayes 7-yard pass from Rowan Keefe, Liam Shepherd kick (Drive: 8 plays, 68 yards, 3:44; Butler 27–20)

Statistics	VAL	BUT
First downs	18	24
Total yards	326	431
Rushing yards	142	275
Passing yards	184	156
Passing: Comp–Att–Int	18–28–0	12–19–2
Time of possession	26:19	33:41

Team	Category	Player	Statistics
Valparaiso	Passing	Rowan Keefe	18/28, 184 yards, 3 TD
Valparaiso	Rushing	Rowan Keefe	10 carries, 78 yards
Valparaiso	Receiving	Devin Yeats	6 receptions, 73 yards, TD
Butler	Passing	Gabe Passini	10/17, 140 yards, TD, 2 INT
Butler	Rushing	Gabe Passini	19 carries, 106 yards, TD
Butler	Receiving	Ershod Jasey II	1 reception, 49 yards, TD
