= Deatrich Wise =

American gridiron football player and coach (born 1965)

No. 78
- Position: Defensive tackle

Personal information
- Born: May 6, 1965 (age 61)
- Listed height: 6 ft 4 in (1.93 m)
- Listed weight: 275 lb (125 kg)

Career information
- High school: Evergreen (Evergreen, Alabama)
- College: Jackson State
- NFL draft: 1988: 9th round, 242nd overall pick

Career history

Playing
- Seattle Seahawks (1988)*; New Orleans Saints (1989)*; BC Lions (1990–1991); Tampa Bay Storm (1992–1995)
- * Offseason or practice squad member only

Coaching
- Jackson State Tigers (1992–1993) (Asst); Tampa Bay Storm (1994–1995) (OL / DL); Delaware State Hornets (1997–1999) (Asst); Grand Rapids Rampage (1999–2000) (OL / DL); Norfolk Nighthawks (2000) (HC); I. C. Norcom High School (2004–2006) (HC); Dallas Desperados (2007–2008) (Asst)

Awards and highlights
- 2× ArenaBowl champion (1993, 1995); First-team All-Arena (1993)
- Stats at ArenaFan.com

Deatrich Wise (born May 6, 1965) is an American former professional football defensive tackle who played for the BC Lions of the Canadian Football League (CFL) and the Tampa Bay Storm of the Arena Football League (AFL). He was selected by the Seattle Seahawks in the ninth round of the 1988 NFL draft. He played college football at Alabama State University and Jackson State University.

== Early life ==
Wise played high school football at Evergreen High School in Evergreen, Alabama. He played on the offensive and defensive lines as well as spending time as a placekicker. He received the Defensive Lineman of the Year Award, and the Wendell Hart Memorial Trophy for Most Valuable Player in 1983.

== College career ==
Wise first played college football for the Alabama State Hornets of Alabama State University. He transferred to play for the Jackson State Tigers of Jackson State University. The Tigers made the NCAA Division I-AA football playoffs in 1985, 1986 and 1987.

== Professional career ==
Wise was selected by the Seattle Seahawks in the ninth round with the 242nd pick in the 1988 NFL draft. He spent time with the New Orleans Saints in 1989. He played for the BC Lions from 1990 to 1991. Wise was a member of the Tampa Bay Storm from 1992 to 1995, earning first-team All-Arena honors in 1993.

== Coaching career ==
Wise was an assistant coach for the Jackson State Tigers from 1992 to 1993, working with the offensive line, defensive line and special teams. He was an offensive and defensive line coach for the Tampa Bay Storm from 1994 to 1995.

After coaching football and track for the Birmingham Public Schools System from 1996 to 1997, Wise served as an assistant coach for the Delaware State Hornets of Delaware State University from 1997 to 1999. He was an assistant offensive and defensive line coach for the Grand Rapids Rampage from 1999 to 2000. He was head coach of the Norfolk Nighthawks of the af2 from 2000 to 2001. The Nighthawks finished with an 11-11 record under Wise.

After coaching track and field and football for the Norfolk Public Schools System from 2001 to 2003, Wise was head coach at I. C. Norcom High School in Virginia from 2004 to 2006.

He served as an assistant coach for the Dallas Desperados from 2007 to 2008. He became the head coach at Coppell Middle School West in 2014.

== Personal life ==
His oldest son, Deatrich Jr., was a fourth-round pick of the New England Patriots in 2017. His youngest son, Daniel, has NFL experience as well, playing for the Washington Commanders and Kansas City Chiefs.
