= Mike Neu =

American gridiron football player and coach (born 1970)

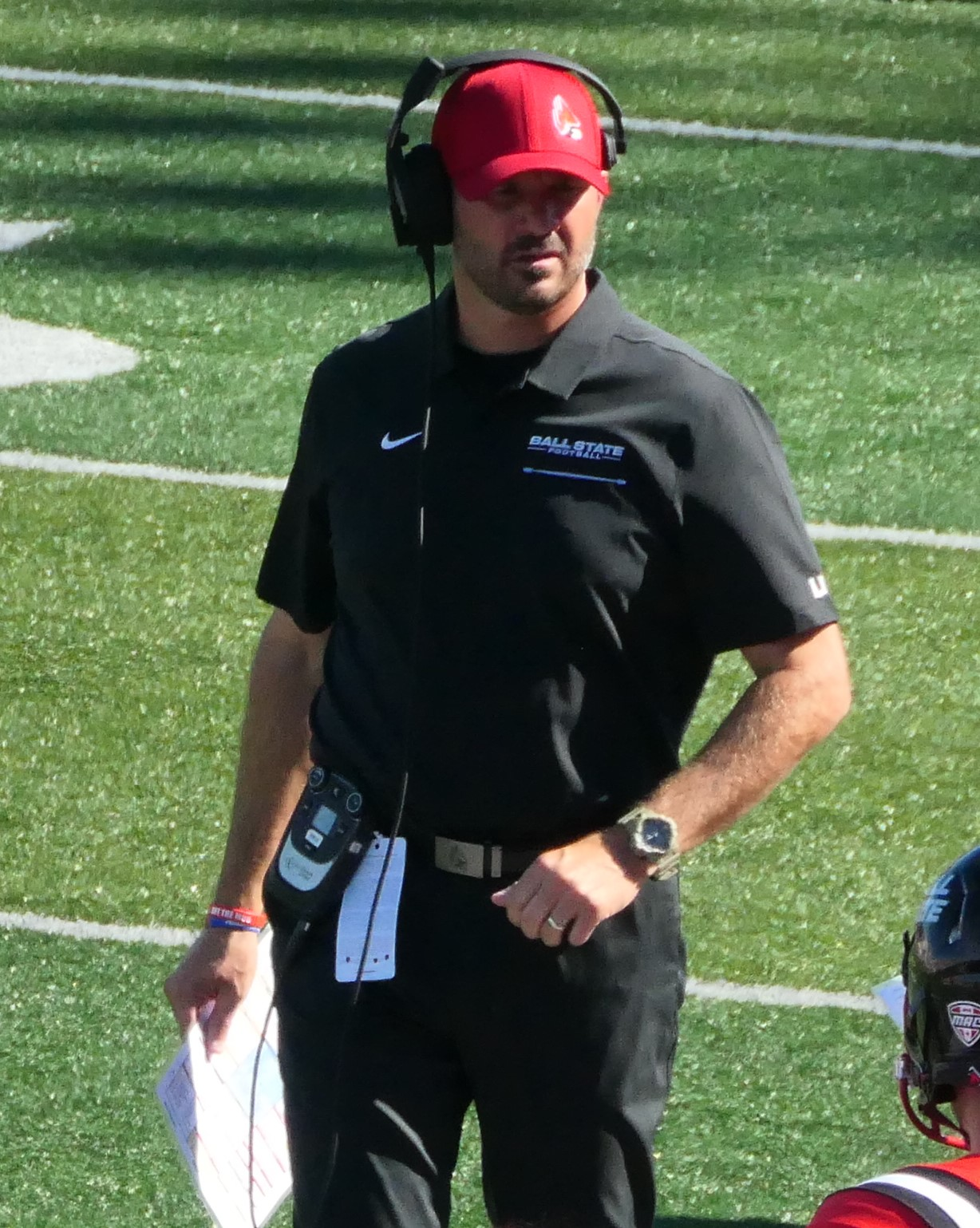
- Neu coaching the Ball State Cardinals in 2019

Illinois Fighting Illini
- Title: Senior offensive assistant

Personal information
- Born: December 29, 1970 (age 55); Indianapolis, Indiana, U.S.
- Listed height: 6 ft 5 in (1.96 m)
- Listed weight: 220 lb (100 kg)

Career information
- Position: Quarterback
- High school: Perry Meridian (Indianapolis)
- College: Ball State
- NFL draft: 1994: undrafted

Career history

Playing
- Calgary Stampeders (1995); Grenoble Centaures (1995); Orlando Predators (1996); Nashville Kats (1997)

Coaching
- Ball State (1994) Graduate assistant; Nashville Kats (1998) Quarterbacks coach; Nashville Kats (1999) Offensive coordinator; Augusta Stallions (2000) Head coach; Carolina Cobras (2001) Offensive coordinator; Carolina Cobras (2001–2002) Head coach; New Orleans VooDoo (2004–2008) Head coach; Tulane (2012–2013) Quarterbacks coach; New Orleans Saints (2014–2015) Quarterbacks coach; Ball State (2016–2024) Head coach; Illinois (2025–present) Senior offensive assistant

Operations
- New Orleans Saints (2009–2011) Pro scout

Awards and highlights
- As player: MAC Most Valuable Player (1993); MAC Offensive Player of the Year (1993); As coach: MAC champion (2020); AFL Coach of the Year (2004)

Career AFL statistics
- Completions: 3
- Attempts: 4
- Yards: 22
- Touchdowns: 1
- Interceptions: 0
- Stats at ArenaFan.com

Head coaching record
- Regular season: AFL: 52–43 (.494); NCAA: 40–63 (.388)
- Postseason: AFL: 2–4 (.333)
- Career: AFL: 54–47 (.482); NCAA: 40–63 (.388)

Michael David Neu (born December 29, 1970) is an American football coach and former quarterback who serves as a senior offensive assistant for Illinois. He recently served as the head football coach at Ball State. He played college football at Ball State for Paul Schudel from 1990 to 1993. Neu played in the Canadian Football League (CFL) for one season, in France Championnat Élite Division 1 one season, then in the Arena Football League (AFL) for two seasons from 1996 to 1997. He then served as the head coach of the af2's Augusta Stallions (2000), the AFL's Carolina Cobras (2001–2002) and the New Orleans VooDoo (2004–2008). In 2016, Neu returned to his alma mater, Ball State.

== Early life and playing career ==
Born in Indianapolis, Indiana on December 29, 1970, Neu is the son of Gwyndoline and Ed Neu. He attended Perry Meridian High School in Indianapolis, where was the starting quarterback. He was named All-State as a senior in 1989. Neu grew up a fan of the University of Notre Dame. In 1990, Neu enrolled at Ball State University and played quarterback for the Cardinals, starting for four seasons. As a senior in 1993, he led Ball State to the Mid-American Conference (MAC) championship, was named the MAC MVP and Offensive Player of the Year.

Neu signed with the Calgary Stampeders of the Canadian Football League, where he served as a backup to Doug Flutie in 1995. He signed with the Grenoble Centaures in France. In 1996, Neu signed with the Orlando Predators of the Arena Football League, where he spent the season as a backup to Pat O'Hara. He appeared in a single game for the Predators, throwing and rushing for touchdowns. The following year he signed with the Nashville Kats, but never appeared in a single game.

== Coaching career ==
In 1994, before pursuing a professional career, Neu would become a graduate assistant for Ball State.

From 1998 to 1999, he would remain with the Kats, but in the roles of quarterbacks coach and offensive coordinator respectfully. In 2000, he turned to the af2 as the head coach of the Augusta Stallions. Neu returned to the AFL ranks in 2001 as the offensive coordinator for the Carolina Cobras. When head coach Doug Kay resigned suddenly during the season, Neu was elevated to head coach of the Cobras, leading them to a Wild Card round loss to the Indiana Firebirds. After having the interim tag removed, Neu led the Cobras to the AFL Semifinals, where they lost to AFL runner-up, Arizona Rattlers. After taking a year off, Neu was named the head coach of the New Orleans VooDoo and led them to a 2004 South Division Title. During the 2006 AFL season, while the VooDoo suspended operations for the season, he worked as a professional scout for the National Football League's New Orleans Saints.

In 2014, Neu left his job as quarterbacks coach with the Tulane Green Wave football team, to take the same position with the Saints.

Neu was named the head coach at his alma mater Ball State on January 7, 2016. Neu was signed to a two-year extension in 2020. In the 2020 season, Mike Neu guided Ball State to their first bowl victory in school history defeating the 19th ranked San Jose State Spartans by a score of 34–13 in the Arizona Bowl. Ball State fired Neu with two games remaining in the 2024 season. In almost nine seasons, Neu had 40 wins and 63 losses, with 2020 the sole winning season. Colin Johnson succeeded him as interim head coach.

== Head coaching record ==
=== Professional ===
Team	Year	Regular season					Postseason			
Team	Year	Won	Lost	Ties	Win %	Finish	Won	Lost	Win %	Result
AUG	2000	13	3	0	.813	1st in AF2 American Conference	1	1	.500	Lost to Tennessee Valley Vipers in Semifinals.
AF2 total		13	3	0	.813		1	1	.500	–
CAR	2001	0	1	0	.000	3rd in AFL Eastern Division	0	1	.000	Lost to Indiana Firebirds in Wild Card Round.
CAR	2002	6	8	0	.429	2nd in AFL Southern Division	1	1	.500	Lost to Arizona Rattlers in Quarterfinals.
CAR total		6	9	0	.400		1	2	.333	–
NO	2004	11	5	0	.688	1st in AFL Southern Division	0	1	.000	Lost to Colorado Crush in Quarterfinals.
NO	2005	9	7	0	.562	4th in AFL Southern Division	–	–	–	–
NO	2007	5	11	0	.313	4th in AFL Southern Division	–	–	–	–
NO	2008	8	8	0	.500	T-3rd in AFL Southern Division	–	–	–	–
NO total		33	31	0	.516		0	1	.000	–
AFL total		39	40	0	.494		1	3	.250	–
Total		52	43	0	.547		2	4	.333	–

=== College ===
Year	Team	Overall	Conference	Standing	Bowl/playoffs	Coaches^{#}	AP^{°}
Ball State Cardinals (Mid-American Conference) (2016–2024)
2016	Ball State	4–8	1–7	6th (West)			
2017	Ball State	2–10	0–8	6th (West)			
2018	Ball State	4–8	3–5	5th (West)			
2019	Ball State	5–7	4–4	T–3rd (West)			
2020	Ball State	7–1	5–1	1st (West)	W Arizona	23	23
2021	Ball State	6–7	4–4	T–4th (West)	L Camellia		
2022	Ball State	5–7	3–5	T–4th (West)			
2023	Ball State	4–8	3–5	T–4th (West)			
2024	Ball State	3–7	2–4	(Note: Ball State fired Neu with two games remaining)			
Ball State:		40–63	25–43				
Total:		40–63					
