= Deatrich Wise Jr. =

American football player (born 1994)

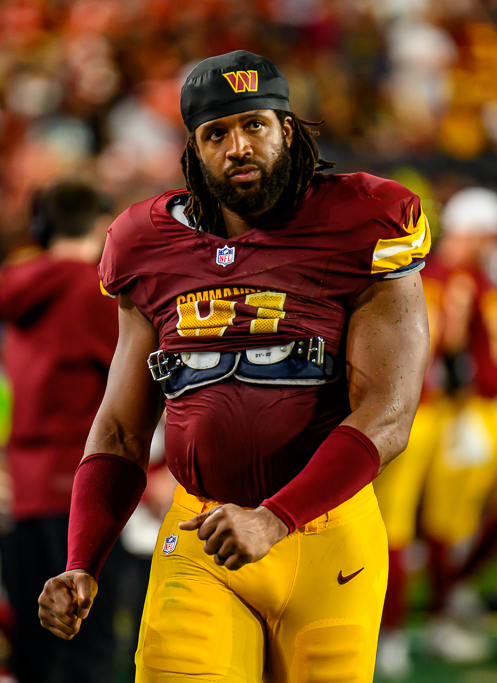
- Wise with the Washington Commanders in 2025

No. 91 – Washington Commanders
- Position: Defensive end
- Roster status: Active

Personal information
- Born: July 26, 1994 (age 32); Suffolk, Virginia, U.S.
- Listed height: 6 ft 5 in (1.96 m)
- Listed weight: 280 lb (127 kg)

Career information
- High school: Hebron (Carrollton, Texas)
- College: Arkansas (2012–2016)
- NFL draft: 2017: 4th round, 131st overall pick

Career history
- New England Patriots (2017–2024); Washington Commanders (2025–present)

Awards and highlights
- Super Bowl champion (LIII)

Career NFL statistics as of 2025
- Tackles: 318
- Sacks: 34
- Forced fumbles: 5
- Fumble recoveries: 1
- Pass deflections: 12
- Touchdowns: 1
- Stats at Pro Football Reference

Deatrich Wise Jr. (born July 26, 1994) is an American professional football defensive end for the Washington Commanders of the National Football League (NFL). He played college football for the Arkansas Razorbacks and was selected by the New England Patriots in the fourth round of the 2017 NFL draft.

== Early life ==
Wise was born on July 26, 1994, in Suffolk, Virginia, as the eldest of three sons to Sheila and former football player Deatrich Wise. He attended Hebron High School in Carrollton, Texas, where he played defensive end for the Hebron Hawks football team. The overall rating consensus from Scout.com, Rivals.com and 247Sports ranked Wise as one of the top 40 defensive ends in the nation. His three-star recruitment prospect rating earned Wise offers from Arkansas, Texas A&M, Vanderbilt, Arizona, Purdue and Wake Forest.

== College career ==
Wise played college football for the Arkansas Razorbacks. He accepted an invitation to play in the 2017 East–West Shrine Game. Wise recorded eight combined tackles, 1.5 sacks, four quarterback pressures, and a forced fumble during their 10–3 victory over the East. His dominant performance and game-high eight tackles raised his draft stock with multiple draft experts reporting his rise up draft boards. He was one of 59 defensive linemen invited to the NFL Scouting Combine in Indianapolis, Indiana. On March 15, 2017, he opted to participate at Arkansas' Pro Day. Wise made the First-Year SEC Academic Honor Roll for the 2012–2013 semester. He graduated in 2016 with a degree in kinesiology.

== Professional career ==
Pre-draft measurables
Height	Weight	Arm length	Hand span	Wingspan	40-yard dash	10-yard split	20-yard split	20-yard shuttle	Three-cone drill	Vertical jump	Broad jump	Bench press
6 ft 5 1/4 in (1.96 m)	274 lb (124 kg)	35 5/8 in (0.90 m)	10 1/2 in (0.27 m)	7 ft 0 7/8 in (2.16 m)	4.92 s	1.70 s	2.86 s	4.36 s	7.07 s	33 in (0.84 m)	10 ft 4 in (3.15 m)	22 reps
All values from NFL Combine

=== New England Patriots ===
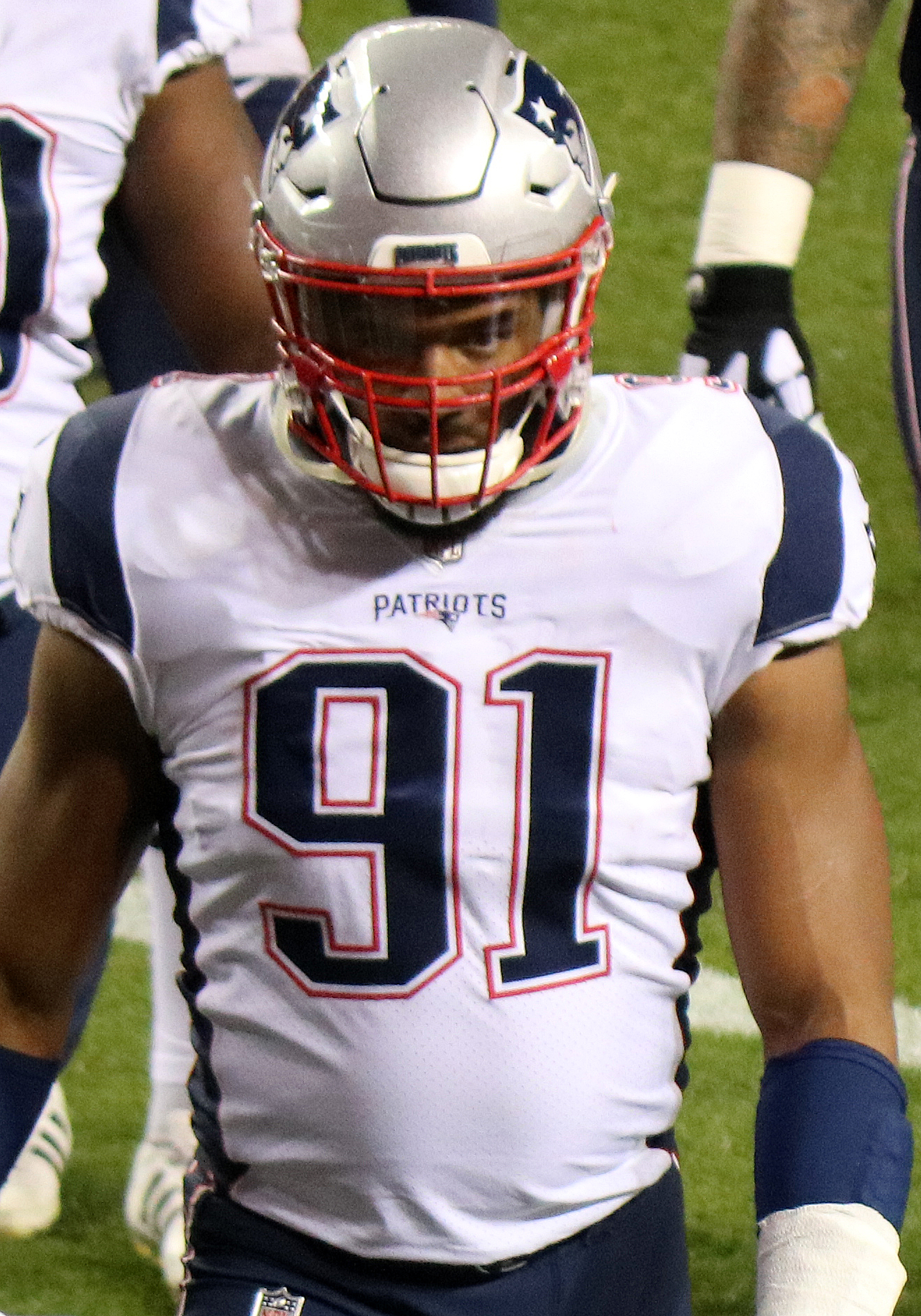
Wise with the New England Patriots in 2017

The New England Patriots selected Wise in the fourth round (131st overall) of the 2017 NFL draft. On May 18, 2017, the New England Patriots signed Wise to a four-year, $2.97 million contract that includes a signing bonus of $575,883. He recorded his first sack against the Kansas City Chiefs in his first career game. Wise finished his rookie season with 26 tackles and 5 sacks. In the Divisional Round, the Patriots defeated the Tennessee Titans with Wise recording 2 sacks. The Patriots then went on to defeat the Jacksonville Jaguars in the AFC Championship and advanced to Super Bowl LII, where they would go on to lose 41–33 to the Philadelphia Eagles.

Wise finished 2018 season with 30 tackles (15 solo) and 4.5 sacks. Wise helped the Patriots reach Super Bowl LIII where they beat the Los Angeles Rams 13–3. In Week 3 of the 2020 season against the Las Vegas Raiders, Wise strip sacked Derek Carr and recovered the football in the end zone for his first career touchdown during the 36–20 win. On March 19, 2021, Wise re-signed with the Patriots on a four-year, $22 million deal. Wise had his best career year in 2022, starting 16 games, recording a career-high 7.5 sacks and 59 tackles.

=== Washington Commanders ===
On March 19, 2025, Wise signed a one-year, $5 million contract with the Washington Commanders. On September 11, Wise suffered a season-ending quad injury in the Commanders' Week 2 matchup with the Green Bay Packers. Four days later, the Commanders placed him on injured reserve.

Wise signed a one-year contract extension with the Commanders on March 6, 2026. After spending all of training camp on the physically unable to perform list, the Commanders chose to keep Wise on the list at the start of the 2026 season meaning he was required to sit out the first four games of the season. Ahead of the Week 5 game, the Commanders activated Wise on October 10, 2026.

== Personal life ==
His father, Deatrich Wise, and younger brother, Daniel Wise, have also played professional football. His mother, Shiela Wise, served 22 years as a nurse in the US Army.

Wise is a vegan and became a part time owner of Veggie Galaxy, a restaurant in Cambridge, Massachusetts, in 2024. He was also inducted into the Hebron High School Hall of Fame the same year. Wise and his family operate a non-contact youth program called Wise Big Man Camp, opened to 7th–12th graders interested in learning the basics of football.
