= 2022 Ball State Cardinals football team =

American college football season

2022 Ball State Cardinals football
- Conference: Mid-American Conference
- West Division
- Record: 5–7 (3–5 MAC)
- Head coach: Mike Neu (7th season)
- Offensive coordinator: Kevin Lynch (3rd season)
- Offensive scheme: Multiple
- Defensive coordinator: Tyler Stockton (4th season)
- Base defense: 3–4
- Home stadium: Scheumann Stadium

2022 Mid-American Conference football standings
	Conf.			Overall
Team	W		L	W		L
East Division
Ohio xy	7	–	1	10	–	4
Buffalo	5	–	3	7	–	6
Bowling Green	5	–	3	6	–	7
Miami (OH)	4	–	4	6	–	7
Kent State	4	–	4	5	–	7
Akron	1	–	7	2	–	10
West Division
Toledo xy$	5	–	3	9	–	5
Eastern Michigan x	5	–	3	9	–	4
Western Michigan	4	–	4	5	–	7
Ball State	3	–	5	5	–	7
Central Michigan	3	–	5	4	–	8
Northern Illinois	2	–	6	3	–	9
Championship: Toledo 17, Ohio 7
$ – Conference champion; x – Division champion/co-champions; y – Championship game participant; Rankings from AP Poll

The 2022 Ball State Cardinals football team represented Ball State University during the 2022 NCAA Division I FBS football season. The Cardinals were led by seventh-year head coach Mike Neu and played their home games at Scheumann Stadium in Muncie, Indiana. They competed as members of the West Division of the Mid-American Conference.

== Schedule ==
Date	Time	Opponent	Site	TV	Result	Attendance
September 1	7:00 p.m.	at Tennessee*	Neyland Stadium; Knoxville, TN	SECN	L 10–59	92,236
September 10	2:00 p.m.	Western Michigan	Scheumann Stadium; Muncie, IN	ESPN+	L 30–37	12,972
September 17	2:00 p.m.	Murray State*	Scheumann Stadium; Muncie, IN	ESPN+	W 31–0	14,413
September 24	6:00 p.m.	at Georgia Southern*	Paulson Stadium; Statesboro, GA	ESPN+	L 23–34	18,434
October 1	2:00 p.m.	Northern Illinois	Scheumann Stadium; Muncie, IN (Bronze Stalk Trophy)	ESPN+	W 44–38 ^{2OT}	10,012
October 8	3:30 p.m.	at Central Michigan	Kelly/Shorts Stadium; Mount Pleasant, MI	ESPN+	W 17–16	22,305
October 15	2:00 p.m.	UConn*	Scheumann Stadium; Muncie, IN	ESPN3	W 25–21	10,006
October 22	2:00 p.m.	Eastern Michigan^{†}	Scheumann Stadium; Muncie, IN	ESPN+	L 16–20	15,698
November 1	7:00 p.m.	at Kent State	Dix Stadium; Kent, OH	ESPNU	W 27–20	6,455
November 8	8:00 p.m.	at Toledo	Glass Bowl; Toledo, OH	ESPN	L 21–28	14,462
November 15	7:00 p.m.	Ohio	Scheumann Stadium; Muncie, IN	ESPN2	L 18–32	6,722
November 22	7:00 p.m.	Miami (OH)	Yager Stadium; Oxford, OH	ESPN+	L 17–18	14,021
*Non-conference game; ^{†}Homecoming; All times are in Eastern time

== Game summaries ==
=== At Tennessee ===
Ball State Cardinals at Tennessee Volunteers

Team	1	2	3	4	Total
Cardinals	0	0	7	3	10
• Volunteers	17	21	14	7	59

- Date: September 1, 2022
- Location: Neyland Stadium
  Knoxville, TN
- Game start: 7:00 p.m. EDT
- Elapsed time: 3 hours and 27 minutes
- Game attendance: 92,236
- Game weather: Sunny, 87 °F (31 °C)
- Referee: Steve Marlowe
- TV announcers (SECN): Tom Hart (play-by-play), Jordan Rodgers (analyst), and Cole Cubelic (sideline reporter)

Statistics	BALL	TENN
First downs	17	32
Total yards	343	569
Rushing yards	74	218
Passing yards	269	351
Turnovers	3	1
Time of possession	30:05	29:55

Team	Category	Player	Statistics
Ball State	Passing	John Paddock	27/43, 269 yards, 1 TD, 2 INT
Ball State	Rushing	Carson Steele	11 carries, 27 yards
Ball State	Receiving	Jayshon Jackson	5 receptions, 65 yards
Tennessee	Passing	Hendon Hooker	18/25, 221 yards, 2 TD
Tennessee	Rushing	Jaylen Wright	13 carries, 88 yards, 1 TD
Tennessee	Receiving	Cedric Tillman	6 receptions, 68 yards

=== Western Michigan ===
Western Michigan Broncos at Ball State Cardinals

Team	1	2	3	4	Total
• Broncos	7	7	7	16	37
Cardinals	10	6	7	7	30

- Date: September 10, 2022
- Location: Scheumann Stadium
  Muncie, IN
- Game start: 2:00 p.m. EDT
- Elapsed time: 2 hours and 16 minutes
- Game attendance: 12,972
- Game weather: Sunny, 84 °F (29 °C)
- Referee: Billy Williams
- TV announcers (ESPN+): Michael Reghi (play-by-play) and Ryan Cavanaugh (analyst)

Statistics	Western Michigan	Ball State
First downs	27	21
Total yards	437	447
Rushing yards	207	146
Passing yards	230	301
Turnovers	2	1
Time of possession	34:16	25:44

Team	Category	Player	Statistics
Western Michigan	Passing	Jack Salopek	25/43, 230 yards, 1 TD, 1 INT
Western Michigan	Rushing	Sean Tyler	15 carries, 108 yards, 1 TD
Western Michigan	Receiving	Corey Crooms	10 receptions, 102 yards, 1 TD
Ball State	Passing	John Paddock	24/41, 301 yards, 2 TD
Ball State	Rushing	Carson Steele	26 carries, 137 yards, 1 TD
Ball State	Receiving	Amir Abdur-Rahman	7 receptions, 89 yards, 1 TD

=== Murray State ===
Murray State Racers at Ball State Cardinals

Team	1	2	3	4	Total
Racers	0	0	0	0	0
• Cardinals	7	7	10	7	31

- Date: September 17, 2022
- Location: Scheumann Stadium
  Muncie, IN
- Game start: 2:00 p.m. EDT
- Elapsed time: 3 hours and 43 minutes
- Game attendance: 14,413
- Game weather: Sunny, 82 °F (28 °C)
- Referee: Jeremy Valentine
- TV announcers (ESPN+): Jim Barbar (play-by-play) and Ryan Cavanaugh (analyst)

Statistics	Murray State	Ball State
First downs	9	26
Total yards	155	476
Rushing yards	87	249
Passing yards	68	227
Turnovers	3	1
Time of possession	23:32	36:28

Team	Category	Player	Statistics
Murray State	Passing	Isaac McNamee	7/22, 57 yards, 2 INT
Murray State	Rushing	Jawaun Northington	17 carries, 71 yards
Murray State	Receiving	DeQuan Dallas	2 receptions, 27 yards
Ball State	Passing	John Paddock	27/44, 227 yards, 3 TD, 1 INT
Ball State	Rushing	Carson Steele	25 carries, 141 yards, 1 TD
Ball State	Receiving	Jayshon Jackson	6 receptions, 64 yards, 1 TD

=== At Georgia Southern ===
	1	2	3	4	Total
Cardinals	3	7	10	3	23
Eagles	3	10	7	14	34

=== Northern Illinois ===
	1	2	3	4	OT	2OT	Total
Huskies	7	17	7	7	0	0	38
Cardinals	0	7	14	17	0	6	44

=== At Central Michigan ===
	1	2	3	4	Total
Cardinals	0	7	7	3	17
Chippewas	10	0	6	0	16

=== UConn ===
UConn Huskies at Ball State Cardinals – Game summary

Quarter	1	2	3	4	Total
Huskies	7	14	0	0	21
Cardinals	7	3	3	12	25

at Scheumann Stadium • Muncie, Indiana

- Date: October 15
- Game time: 2:02 p.m.
- Game weather: Temperature: 53 °F (12 °C) • Weather: Sunny
- Game attendance: 10,006
- Referee: Ron Hudson
- TV announcers (ESPN3): Jim Barbar (play-by-play) & Adam Breneman (color analyst)

Game information

First quarter

- CONN – Aaron Turner 19 yd pass from Zion Turner (Noe Ruelas kick), 9:58. Huskies 7–0. Drive: 6 plays, 69 yards, TOP 02:43
- BSU – Carson Steele 1 yd run (Ben VonGunten kick), 0:15. Tied 7–7. Drive: 12 plays, 73 yards, TOP 05:18

Second quarter

- CONN – Justin Joly 39 yd pass from Zion Turner (Noe Ruelas kick), 12:25. Huskies 14–7. Drive: 6 plays, 69 yards, TOP 02:41
- BSU – Ben VonGunten 38-yard field goal, 9:21. Huskies 14–10. Drive: 9 plays, 54 yards, TOP 03:04
- CONN – Robert Burns 1 yd run (Noe Ruelas kick), 0:58. Huskies 21–10. Drive: 9 plays, 64 yards, TOP 01:53

Third quarter

- BSU – Ben VonGunten 38-yard field goal, 10:34. Huskies 21–13. Drive: 10 plays, 29 yards, TOP 03:14

Fourth quarter

- BSU – Carson Steele 2 yd run (2 pt conv no good), 7:24. Huskies 21–19. Drive: 4 plays, 24 yards, TOP 00:41
- BSU – Carson Steele 17 yd run (2 pt conv no good), 2:40. Cardinals 25–21. Drive: 8 plays, 59 yards, TOP 02:35

Top passers

- CONN – Zion Turner – 18/22, 129 yards, 2 TDs
- BSU – John Paddock – 19/39, 147 yards

Top rushers

- CONN – Victor Rosa – 17 rushes, 72 yards
- BSU – Carson Steele – 32 rushes, 179 yards, 3 TDs

Top receivers

- CONN – Aaron Turner – 8 receptions, 56 yards, 1 TD
- BSU – Jayshon Jackson – 8 receptions, 71 yards

Top defense

- CONN – Jackson Mitchell – 13 tackles
- BSU – Jordan Riley – 14 tackles

Statistics	UConn	BSU
First downs	16	22
Total yards	323	356
Rushing yards	194	209
Passing yards	129	147
Turnovers	2	1
Time of possession	30:23	29:37

=== Eastern Michigan ===
	1	2	3	4	Total
Eagles	0	10	0	10	20
Cardinals	0	7	9	0	16

=== At Kent State ===
	1	2	3	4	Total
Cardinals	0	17	3	7	27
Golden Flashes	13	0	0	7	20

=== At Toledo ===
	1	2	3	4	Total
Cardinals	7	7	7	0	21
Rockets	7	7	7	7	28

=== Ohio ===
Ohio Bobcats (7–3, 5–1) vs. Ball State Cardinals (5–5, 3–3)

Quarter	1	2	3	4	Total
Ohio	0	17	2	13	32
Ball State	3	0	8	7	18

at Scheumann Stadium • Muncie, IN

- Date: Tuesday, November 15, 2022
- Game time: 7:00 p.m. EST
- Game weather: snow, Temperature:32 °F (0 °C)
- Game attendance: 6,722
- Referee: Rod Hudson
- TV announcers (ESPN2): Chris Cotter, Dustin Fox, Taylor Davis

Game information

First Quarter

- (06:44) BSU – VonGunten, Ben 21 yd field goal 11 plays, 76 yards, TOP 05:28 (BSU 3-0)

Second Quarter

- (13:14) OHIO – Bangura, Sieh 6 yd run (Vakos, Nathanial kick) 15 plays, 81 yards, TOP 08:30 (OHIO 7–3)
- (08:13) OHIO – Wiglusz, Sam 13 yd pass from Rourke, Kurtis (Vakos, Nathanial kick) 5 plays, 42 yards, TOP 02:45 (OHIO 14–3)
- (03:34) OHIO – Vakos, Nathanial 21 yd field goal 7 plays, 61 yards, TOP 03:46 (OHIO 17-3)

Third Quarter

- (08:46) OHIO – -1 yd safety 1 play, -1 yard, TOP 00:06 (OHIO 19–3)
- (01:13) BSU – Koziol, Tanner 10 yd pass from Paddock, John (Hunt, Brady pass from Paddock, John) 4 plays, 39 yards, TOP 01:37 (OHIO 19–11)

Fourth Quarter

- (13:52) OHIO – Bangura, Sieh 7 yd run (Vakos, Nathanial kick) 5 plays, 75 yards, TOP 02:20 (OHIO 26–11)
- (09:54) BSU – Hunt, Brady 7 yd pass from Paddock, John (VonGunten, Ben kick) 12 plays, 75 yards, TOP 03:58 (OHIO 26–18)
- (02:44) OHIO – Vakos, Nathanial 37 yd field goal 5 plays, 28 yards, TOP 02:44 (OHIO 29-18)
- (01:00) OHIO – Vakos, Nathanial 23 yd field goal 4 plays, 7 yards, TOP 01:04 (OHIO 32-18)

Statistics	OHIO	BSU
First downs	20	21
Total yards	427	367
Rushes/yards	46/224	19/94
Passing yards	203	273
Passing: Comp–Att–Int	14–24–0	29–48–1
Time of possession	36:38	23:22

Team	Category	Player	Statistics
Ohio	Passing	Kurtis Rourke	12/16, 169 yards
Ohio	Rushing	Sieh Bangura	23 rushes, 148 yards, 2 TD
Ohio	Receiving	Jacoby Jones	5 receptions, 87 yards
Ball State	Passing	John Paddock	29/48, 273 yards, 2 TD, 1 INT
Ball State	Rushing	Carson Steele	23 rushes, 148 yards, 2 TD
Ball State	Receiving	Brady Hunt	9 receptions, 90 yards, 1 TD

=== Miami (OH) ===
	1	2	3	4	Total
Cardinals	7	7	3	0	17
RedHawks	0	3	3	12	18

== Roster ==
2022 Ball State Cardinals football team roster
Players
Coaches
Offense

Pos.	#	Name	Class
WR	11	Amir Abdur-Rahman	Jr
RB	34	Rico Barfield	Fr
QB	16	Colin Blazek	Fr
OL	79	Joseph Boggs	Jr
QB	14	Kaden Cobb	Fr
TE	87	Casey Coll	Sr
OL	54	Ethan Crowe	So
WR	83	Cam Gillentine	So
WR	35	Brody Glenn	Fr
RB	37	Shoka Griffin II	Fr
OL	72	Phyllip Gunn	Fr
OL	74	Porter Haught	So
WR	25	Austin Hill	Fr
OL	66	Chris Hood	Fr
TE	80	Brady Hunt	Fr
WR	12	Jayshon Jackson	Sr
OL	58	Jalen Johnson	Fr
RB	24	Will Jones	Sr
OL	55	Damon Kaylor	So
QB	18	Kiael Kelly	Fr
TE	88	Tanner Koziol	Fr
QB	15	Aidan Leffler	Fr
TE	81	Ryan Lezon	So
OL	63	Tommy Lorincz	Fr
WR	82	Qian Magwood	Fr
OL	62	Brandon Malkow	Jr
RB	20	Donny Marcus	So
WR	0	Derin McCulley	So
OL	71	Kevin Meeder	Fr
WR	17	Dwayne Moorehead	Fr
TE	86	Justin Morris	Fr
OL	73	Cole Mosier	Fr
WR	84	Nick Munson	Fr
QB	13	Mark Nondorf	Jr
QB	5	John Paddock	Jr
WR	21	Dahya Patel	Fr
RB	27	Vaughn Pemberton	Fr
WR	85	Cam Pickett	Fr
WR	19	Nick Presley	Fr
OL	50	Seth Schmidt	So
TE	42	Gavin Smithson-Burciaga	Fr
RB	33	Carson Steele	So
OL	75	Corey Stewart	So
TE	45	Max Sullivan	Fr
WR	10	Dean Tate	So
OL	53	Jaylen Turner	Jr
WR	6	Yo'Heinz Tyler	Sr
OL	77	Taran Tyo	Fr
OL	65	Zach Williams	Fr

Defense

Pos.	#	Name	Class
S	16	Jaquan Amos	GS
CB	22	Thailand Baldwin	Fr
OLB	42	Jack Beebe	Fr
OLB	13	Brandon Berger	So
CB	17	Chayce Bishop	Fr
S	19	Jack Blanco	Jr
ILB	45	Ashton Carroll	Fr
CB	26	Jordan Coleman	Fr
ILB	32	Clayton Coll	Jr
ILB	59	Jackson Constantine	Fr
OLB	31	DeJuan Echoles Jr.	Fr
S	10	Ben Egenolf	So
ILB	55	Dalton Elrod	Fr
S	34	Brayden Evans	So
DL	99	Dakari Frazier	Fr
DL	76	Dylan Graber	Fr
ILB	52	Drew Harper	Fr
DL	97	John Harris	So
S	8	Trenton Hatfield	GS
OLB	36	Sidney Houston Jr.	Jr
DL	95	Drew Hughes	Fr
ILB	30	Caden Johnson	Fr
S	29	Harold Jones	So
CB	46	Jalon Jones	Fr
CB	1	Nic Jones	Jr
DL	92	Kendal Kendrick	Sr
DL	54	Kyle King	So
S	2	Malcolm Lee	Sr
LB	44	Kyle Lozen	So
S	38	Deion Manley	Fr
ILB	7	Brandon Martin	GS
DL	78	Julian McBride	Fr
DL	5	Kyron Mims	So
OLB	9	Keionte Newson	So
OLB	91	Karl Odrick Jr.	Fr
ILB	40	Cole Pearce	Jr
OLB	39	Nate Pedraza	Fr
CB	4	Tyler "Red" Potts	Jr
DL	0	Justen Ramsey	Jr
DL	57	Nathan Reichert	So
S	18	Jordan Riley	So
OLB	43	Danny Royster	Fr
DL	94	Jack Sape	Jr
CB	28	Blair Schonhorst	Fr
CB	21	Latrelle Smith	So
LB	56	Joey Stemler	Fr
S	24	Alex Stirn	Fr
S	23	Loren Strickland	Jr
DL	90	Joshua Tarango	Jr
CB	3	Amechi Uzodinma II	Sr
ILB	47	Maximus Webster	Fr
LB	50	Jackson Wiegold	Fr
DL	6	Tavion Woodard	So

Special teams

Pos.	#	Name	Class
P	15	Lucas Borrow	So
LS	97	Caden Britton	Fr
K	98	Carson Holmer	Fr
LS	49	Dylan Seiler	So
K, P	41	Adam Vinatieri Jr.	Fr
K	14	Ben VonGunten	GS
P	44	Chase Wyatt	GS

Head coach

- Mike Neu

Coordinators/assistant coaches

- Tyler Stockton – Assistant head coach/defensive coordinator/inside linebackers
- Kevin Lynch – Offensive coordinator/quarterbacks
- Cory Connolly – Special teams coordinator/outside linebackers
- Jared Elliott – Passing game coordinator/tight ends
- Vic Hall – Cornerbacks/co-recruiting coordinator
- Joey Hecklinski – Running backs/co-recruiting coordinator
- Colin Johnson – Running game coordinator/offensive line
- Marcus Knight – Wide receivers
- Keith McKenzie – Defensive line
- Josh Zidenberg – Passing game coordinator/defensive backs
- Nate Atkins – Defensive assistant/project coordinator (graduate assistant)
- Jack Connolly – Graduate assistant, offense
- Morgan Hagee – Graduate assistant, special teams & recruiting
- Logan Hale – Graduate assistant, defense
- Eli Johnson – Graduate assistant, offense
- Kenny-Ray Augustus – Defensive assistant

Legend

- (C) Team captain
- (S) Suspended
- (I) Ineligible
- Injured
- Redshirt

Roster
