= Billy Dicken =

American gridiron football player and coach (born 1974)

Biographical details
- Born: December 28, 1974 (age 51); Bloomington, Illinois, U.S.

Playing career
- 1993–1997: Purdue
- 1998: Hamilton Tiger-Cats
- 1999: Nashville Kats
- 2000: Quad City Steamwheelers
- 2000: Hamilton Tiger-Cats
- 2001–2003: Chicago Rush
- 2004: Detroit Fury
- 2005: New Orleans VooDoo
- 2006: Columbus Destroyers
- Position: Quarterback

Coaching career (HC unless noted)
- 2002–2008: Illinois Wesleyan (assistant)
- 2007: Alabama Steeldogs (OC)
- 2009: Eastern New Mexico (WR)
- 2010–2013: Illinois Wesleyan (OC/QB)
- 2014–2015: Illinois State (WR)
- 2016–2017: Illinois State (co-OC/QB)
- 2018–2019: North Carolina St (defense QC)

Accomplishments and honors

Awards
- First-team All-Big Ten (1997)

Billy Charles Dicken (born December 28, 1974) is an American former professional football quarterback who is currently the defensive quality coach for the NC State Football team. Dicken played in the Arena Football League (AFL) from 2001 to 2006 for the Chicago Rush, Detroit Fury, New Orleans VooDoo and the Columbus Destroyers. He played college football at Purdue University from 1994 to 1997.

== Early life ==
Dicken attended Bloomington High School in Bloomington, Illinois. Dicken played for the Raiders football, basketball and baseball teams, earning all-state honors as a quarterback his senior season.

== College career ==
Dicken continued his baseball and football careers at Purdue University in 1993. Dicken took a redshirt season in 1993. He was a backup quarterback to Rick Trefzger in 1994, but still managed to tie Trefzger for the Purdue passing touchdowns lead with 3. In the 1994 Old Oaken Bucket Game, Dicken suffered an injury that kept him out the entire 1995 season. In 1996, Dicken returned to the quarterback position, once again splitting time with Trefzger, and this time John Reeves as well. The Boilermakers finished 3-8 in what became Jim Colletto's 6th and final season at Purdue. In 1997, with Trefzger and Reeves gone with graduation, Dicken was poised to become Purdue's full-time starting quarterback for the first time in his career. With new head coach Joe Tiller, Purdue changed its offensive game plan to a pass-heavy "basketball on grass", a move Dicken liked. Dicken thrived his senior season, leading the Big Ten Conference in pass attempts, completions, passing yards and passing touchdowns on his way to being named a First Team All-Big Ten selection by the coaches.

=== Statistics ===
		Passing							Rushing			Receiving		
Season	Team	Rating	Att	Comp	Pct	Yds	TD	INT	Att	Yds	TD	Rec	Yds	TD
1993	Purdue	--	0	0	--	0	0	0	0	0	0	0	0	0
1994	Purdue	119.2	82	44	53.7	593	3	3	31	136	1	0	0	0
1995	Purdue	--	0	0	--	0	0	0	0	0	0	0	0	0
1996	Purdue	97.3	81	40	49.4	518	1	4	20	-40	0	0	0	0
1997	Purdue	128.9	407	224	55.0	3,136	21	16	97	351	6	2	21	0
	Totals	123.0	570	308	54.0	4,247	25	23	148	447	7	2	21	0

== Professional career ==
=== Pre-draft ===
Despite a successful senior season at Purdue, Dicken's small height compared to other prospects made him unappealing to National Football League teams for the upcoming 1998 NFL draft.

=== Early professional career ===
Dicken was signed by the Canadian Football League's Hamilton Tiger-Cats in 1998, but he was released before training camp in June. Dicken then joined the Arena Football League's Nashville Kats, where he spent the season as the 3rd string quarterback, never appearing in a game. While in Nashville, then assistant coach Frank Haege noticed Dicken during a pregame warm-up. When Haege was named the head coach for af2's Quad City Steamwheelers, he signed Dicken to be his quarterback.

=== Hamilton Tiger-cats ===
Dicken's play in the af2 helped him earn a roster spot with the Tiger-cats in 2000. Dicken was the backup to Danny McManus, and was thrust into action when McManus left a game with an injury.

=== Chicago Rush ===
Dicken's play in the af2 also helped him earn a roster spot with the Chicago Rush in 2001.

== Coaching career ==
On January 17, 2014, Dicken was hired as the wide receivers coach for the Illinois State Redbirds football team.

As of 2021 Dicken works as a Sales Development Representative for ServiceTrade based out of Apex, North Carolina.
