= Tallahassee Thunder =

Arena football team

Logo

General information
- Founded: 1999
- Folded: 2005
- Headquartered: Donald L. Tucker Center in Tallahassee, Florida
- Colors: Black, light blue, grey, white
- Mascot: Thunder King

Team history
- Tallahassee Thunder (2000–2002)

Home fields
- Donald L. Tucker Center (2000–2002)

League / conference affiliations
- af2 (2000–2002): National Conference (2000); American Conference (2001–2002); Southeastern Division (2001); Eastern Division (2002)

Championships
- Division championships: 2: 2001, 2002

Playoff appearances (2)
- 2001, 2002

The Tallahassee Thunder were an arena football team based in Tallahassee, Florida. They were inaugural members of the af2, the Arena Football League's developmental league. They played for three seasons from 2000 to 2002, when they folded. They played their home games at the Tallahassee–Leon County Civic Center.

The Thunder were established in 1999 and played in the af2's inaugural 2000 season. The team made the playoffs during their final two seasons but first-round losses to the Tennessee Valley Vipers and the Florida Firecats (respectively) contributed to the disbanding of the franchise after the 2002 season. The team's mascot was the Thunder King, a big fuzzy brown lion who has found other work since the dissolution.

After the dissolution of the Thunder, Tallahassee would be without an arena or indoor football team until they were granted the Tallahassee Titans franchise by the American Indoor Football Association in 2006.

The Thunder were owned by David Elmore of the Elmore Sports Group and his wife, Donna Tuttle.

== Season-by-season ==
Season records
| Season | W | L | T | Finish | Playoff results |
|---|---|---|---|---|---|
| 2000 | 5 | 11 | 0 | 7th NC | -- |
| 2001 | 11 | 5 | 0 | 1st AC Southeastern | Lost Round 1 (Tennessee Valley 70, Tallahassee 52) |
| 2002 | 9 | 7 | 0 | 1st AC Southern | Lost Round 1 (Florida 43, Tallahassee 31) |
| Totals | 25 | 25 | 0 | (including playoffs) | |
