= Veggie Galaxy =

- Interactive map of Veggie Galaxy

Restaurant information
- Established: September 1, 2011
- Owner: Adam Penn
- Food type: Diner, Vegetarian, Vegan, Bakery
- Dress code: Casual
- Location: 450 Massachusetts Avenue, Cambridge, Middlesex, Massachusetts, 02139, United States
- Coordinates: 42.363526°N 71.100977°W
- Seating capacity: 88
- Website: www.veggiegalaxy.com

Veggie Galaxy is a diner-style vegetarian restaurant located in the Central Square section of Cambridge, Massachusetts.

The establishment was founded by Adam Penn in 2011 after his first vegetarian restaurant, Veggie Planet in Harvard Square, had operated for more than ten years. Veggie Galaxy has been credited in Boston Magazine as “the Best of Boston for Vegetarian Restaurants”

The restaurant is inspired by classic diner and vegetarian cuisine and serves breakfast, lunch, and dinner. According to the owners, the fact that they don't serve any meat or seafood should be considered a "footnote". Veggie Galaxy is mainly concerned with serving full-flavored, balanced dishes that are pleasing to vegetarians, vegans, and omnivores alike.

== History ==
Storefront in 2011

The diner opened for business on September 5, 2011.

In July 2018, Veggie Galaxy's Portobello Melt sandwich was mentioned in Marvel Comics Astonishing X-Men by the character Beast.

In October 2019, the diner was featured on Food Network's Diners, Drive-Ins and Dives (Season 30, Episode 16), during which host Guy Fieri stated, "This needs to go places. People need to have this in their town."

== Media awards ==
Veggie Galaxy has earned numerous awards and prizes since opening.

=== Food awards ===
==== 2020s ====
- The restaurant was named one of the nation's "18 Juicy Vegan Burgers That Are Way Better Than the Big Mac" from VegNews, December 2022
- Named one of the best vegan, plant-based dishes in Boston by Boston.com, September 2021

==== 2010s ====
- The vegan Lemon Meringue pie was named one of the 50 "Best Pie in Every State" for Massachusetts by People Magazine, September 2019
- Best Vegetarian restaurant in Massachusetts from Mental Floss magazine, May 2017
- Where to Eat Great Vegetarian Food from Coast to Coast, Food Network, February 2016
- Vital Brunch Spots to Know in Boston, Eater Boston, February 2016
- The Vegetarian Times Hot Spot, December 2015
- Diners, Drive-Thrus, & Dives, VegNews, 2015
- 24 Vegan Restaurants That Belong on Your Culinary Bucket List, from BuzzFeed, 2015
- Best Brunch in (almost) Every Boston Neighborhood, Thrillist, November 2015
- Voted one of America's 21 best vegetarian/vegan restaurants by Thrillist, 2014.
- Selected one of 15 the best vegan and vegetarian restaurants by Relish (magazine), 2014
- Chosen one of the top 20 best vegetarian restaurants in the United States by Travel + Leisure magazine, 2013
- Best of Boston 2012: Best Vegetarian 2012
- Boston Dig This Award: Best Vegetarian/Vegan 2011, 2012, 2013, 2014, and 2015
- Boston's 10 Hottest Burgers – 2012
- Best Thing We Ate This Week – 2013
- Daily Candy – Best Vegan and Vegetarian Restaurants Across the U. S. (2013)

== See also ==
- List of diners
- List of vegetarian and vegan restaurants
