= 2000 AF2 season =

- League: AF2
- Sport: Arena football

Regular season
- Season champions: Quad City Steamwheelers

Playoffs
- Semifinals champions: Quad City Steamwheelers
- Semifinals runners-up: Norfolk Nighthawks
- Semifinals champions: Tennessee Valley Vipers
- Semifinals runners-up: Augusta Stallions

ArenaCup I
- Champions: Quad City Steamwheelers
- Runners-up: Tennessee Valley Vipers

AF2 seasons
- 2001 →

The 2000 AF2 season was the first season of the af2. It was succeeded by 2001. The league champions were the Quad City Steamwheelers, who capped off a perfect season with a victory over the Tennessee Valley Vipers in ArenaCup I. This is the only AF2 season lacking division alignment.

== League info ==
New teams	Arkansas Twisters, Augusta Stallions, Birmingham Steeldogs, Carolina Rhinos, Charleston Swamp Foxes, Greensboro Prowlers, Jacksonville Tomcats, Norfolk Nighthawks, Pensacola Barracudas, Quad City Steamwheelers, Richmond Speed, Roanoke Steam, Tallahassee Thunder, Tennessee Valley Vipers, Tulsa Talons
Renamed or Relocated teams	None
Defunct teams	None
Total teams	15

== Standings ==
Team	Overall			Conference		
Team	Wins	Losses	Percentage	Wins	Losses	Percentage
American Conference
Augusta Stallions	13	3	0.812	10	2	0.833
Norfolk Nighthawks	10	6	0.625	9	4	0.600
Jacksonville Tomcats	9	7	0.562	5	4	0.556
Carolina Rhinos	9	7	0.562	5	4	0.556
Richmond Speed	7	9	0.437	6	4	0.600
Charleston Swamp Foxes	4	12	0.333	3	7	0.300
Greensboro Prowlers	3	13	0.187	0	8	0.167
Roanoke Steam	3	13	0.187	0	8	0.167
National Conference
Quad City Steamwheelers	16	0	1.000	11	0	1.000
Tennessee Valley Vipers	10	6	0.625	6	3	0.667
Tulsa Talons	9	7	0.562	5	7	0.417
Pensacola Barracudas	8	8	0.500	6	3	0.667
Birmingham Steeldogs	7	9	0.437	3	7	0.300
Arkansas Twisters	7	9	0.437	2	7	0.222
Tallahassee Thunder	5	11	0.312	1	7	0.125

== Playoffs ==
Round 1
6	Tulsa	28
3	Tennessee Valley	49
7	Carolina	64
2	Augusta	76
5	Jacksonville	28
4	Norfolk	41
8	Pensacola	19
1	Quad Cities	55

Semifinals
3	Tennessee Valley	47
2	Augusta	40
4	Norfolk	27
1	Quad Cities	75

ArenaCup I
3	Tennessee Valley	59
1	Quad Cities	68

== Awards and honors ==
=== Regular season awards ===
Award	Winner	Position	Team
Offensive Player of the Year	Aaron Sparrow	Quarterback	Augusta Stallions
Defensive Player of the Year	Cornelius Coe	Defensive lineman	Quad City Steamwheelers
Ironman of the Year	Xavier Patterson	Wide receiver/Defensive back	Quad City Steamwheelers
Coach of the Year	Mike Neu	Head coach	Augusta Stallions

== ArenaCup I ==
ArenaCup I

Quarter	1	2	3	4	Tot
Quad City Steamwheelers	21	20	14	13	68
Tennessee Valley Vipers	14	17	28	0	59

Date
August 10, 2000
Arena
The Mark of the Quad Cities
City
Moline, Illinois
Attendance
9,201
Most Valuable Player
Shon King
Ironman of the Game
Xavier Patterson
Winning Coach
Frank Haege
Losing Coach
Tom Luginbill

ArenaCup I was the 2000 edition of the af2's championship game, in which the National Conference runners-up Tennessee Valley Vipers were defeated by the National Conference Champions Quad City Steamwheelers in Moline, Illinois by a score of 68 to 59.

Scoring summary

Quarter	Time	Drive			Team	Scoring information	Score	
Quarter	Time	Plays	Yards	TOP	Team	Scoring information	Tennessee Valley Vipers	Quad City Steamwheelers
1	14:51	1	54	0:09	Quad City Steamwheelers	55 Yard Kickoff return Touchdown by Shon King, Brion Hurley Kick Good	0	7
1	10:49	2	42	1:14	Quad City Steamwheelers	Shon King 29-yard touchdown reception from Billy Dicken, Brion Hurley kick Good	0	14
1	6:29	7	40	4:20	Tennessee Valley Vipers	Ronald Bonner 11-yard touchdown reception from Bryan Snyder, Michael Proctor kick Good	7	14
1	3:45	3	42	2:44	Quad City Steamwheelers	Xavier Patterson 2-yard touchdown run, Brion Hurley kick Good	7	21
1	0:25	4	38	3:20	Tennessee Valley Vipers	Danny Thomas 15-yard touchdown reception from Bryan Snyder, Michael Proctor kick Good	14	21
2	13:50	2	41	1:35	Quad City Steamwheelers	Shon King 32-yard touchdown reception from Billy Dicken, Brion Hurley kick Failed	14	27
2	9:48	5	45	4:02	Tennessee Valley Vipers	Bobby Washington 3-yard touchdown reception from Bryan Snyder, Michael Proctor kick Good	21	27
2	7:28	3	12	2:20	Quad City Steamwheelers	Billy Dicken 1-yard touchdown run, Brion Hurley kick Good	21	34
2	4:55	3	30	2:33	Tennessee Valley Vipers	Kelly Fields 25-yard touchdown reception from Bryan Snyder, Michael Proctor kick Good	28	34
2	3:00	2	17	1:55	Quad City Steamwheelers	Xavier Patterson 12-yard touchdown reception from Billy Dicken, Brion Hurley kick Good	28	41
2	0:00	10	40	3:00	Tennessee Valley Vipers	18-yard field goal by Michael Proctor	31	41
3	13:12	3	45	1:48	Tennessee Valley Vipers	Bobby Washington 34-yard touchdown reception from Bryan Snyder, Michael Proctor kick Good	38	41
3	11:14	2	12	1:06	Tennessee Valley Vipers	Bryan Snyder 1-yard touchdown run, Michael Proctor kick Good	45	41
3	11:04	1	0	0:10	Tennessee Valley Vipers	Ronald Bonner recovered ball off the net in the end zone after the kickoff, Michael Proctor Kick Good	52	41
3	10:22	1	57	0:42	Quad City Steamwheelers	57 Yard Kickoff Return Touchdown by Shon King, Brion Hurley Kick Good	52	48
3	5:46	1	53		Quad City Steamwheelers	53 yard missed Field Goal Return Touchdown by Shon King, Brion Hurley Kick Good	52	55
3	0:20	7	42	5:26	Tennessee Valley Vipers	Bobby Washington 16-yard touchdown reception from Bryan Snyder, Michael Proctor kick Good	59	55
4	12:55	3	37	2:25	Quad City Steamwheelers	Xavier Patterson 37-yard touchdown reception from Billy Dicken, Brion Hurley kick Failed	59	61
4	0:58	7	49	5:12	Quad City Steamwheelers	Billy Dicken 1-yard touchdown run, Brion Hurley kick Good	59	68
"TOP" = time of possession. For other American football terms, see Glossary of American football.							Tennessee Valley Vipers	Quad City Steamwheelers
