= Cornell Craig =

American football wide receiver

Cornell Craig was a wide receiver at Southern Illinois University Carbondale (1996–1999). Craig is the first receiver at the university to earn unanimous 1st Team All-American honors (1999). In the 1999 season Craig was voted the MVC Football Conference Player of the Year. For his final three years he achieved all-conference honors. He is the first and only player in school history to reach 1,000 yards receiving in a single season. During his senior season, he led the nation in receiving with 77 receptions for 1,419 yards and 15 touchdowns. He also amassed over 2,000 all-purpose yards as a senior. His career numbers (all Saluki records) are 207 receptions, 3,508 yards, and 37 touchdowns. Craig totaled 4,557 all-purpose yards in his college career. He ended his career ranked in the top 10 all-time in NCAA receiving yards. He was inducted into the SIU Athletic Hall of Fame in 2008 and is also honored on Missouri Valley Football Conference 25th anniversary team along with 3 other Salukis. Craig was initiated in the Gamma Upsilon chapter of Kappa Alpha Psi fraternity at SIUC in 1998.
