= Carolina Rhinos =

Arena football team

Logo

General information
- Founded: 2000
- Folded: 2002
- Headquartered: Bi-Lo Center in Greenville, South Carolina
- Colors: Navy blue, red, silver, white

Personnel
- Owner: Carl Scheer
- CEO: Carl Scheer
- General manager: Byron K. Rucker
- Head coach: Rod Miller
- President: Bob Scheer

Team history
- Carolina Rhinos (2000–2002)

Home fields
- Bi-Lo Center (2000–2002)

League / conference affiliations
- af2 (2000–2002): American Conference (2000–2002); Eastern Division (2001–2002)

Playoff appearances (2)
- 2000, 2001

The Carolina Rhinos were one of the original 15 teams to join the inaugural 2000 AF2 season. They were members of the American Conference for their entirety of existence, and the Eastern Division in 2001 and 2002. In their first year, they won 7 of their first 9 games, finished the 2000 season with a 9 wins and 7 losses, en route to the playoffs, before losing to the Augusta Stallions. In 2001, again, they won 7 of their first 9 games, completing a season record of 12 wins and 4 losses, and for the first time ever, they won a playoff game, beating the Tulsa Talons, before losing to the eventual champion, Quad City Steamwheelers. In 2002, everyone expected Carolina to not only go to the playoffs, but to do something great. The Rhinos. didn't do so well on the playing field, going 5–11, and missed the playoffs. To add insult to injury, the Rhinos folded after their post season-less year, and left arena football to the Carolina Cobras, which fittingly, folded 2 years after the Rhinos said good-bye to the BI-LO Center.

== Season-by-season ==
ArenaCup Champions	ArenaCup Appearances	Division champions	Playoff berth

Season	League	Conference	Division	Regular season			Postseason results
Season	League	Conference	Division	Finish	Wins	Losses	Postseason results
Carolina Rhinos
2000	AF2	American		4th	9	7	Lost Round 1 (Augusta 76–64)
2001	AF2	American	Eastern	2nd	12	4	Won Round 1 (Tulsa 69–35); Lost Semifinals (Quad City 35–16)
2002	AF2	American	Eastern	3rd	5	11	
Total					26	22	(includes only regular season)
Total					1	2	(includes only the postseason)
Total					27	24	(includes both regular season and postseason)
