= Pensacola Barracudas (arena football) =

Arena football team

Logo

General information
- Founded: 1999
- Folded: 2002
- Headquartered: Pensacola Civic Center in Pensacola, Florida
- Colors: Navy blue, green, white

Team history
- Pensacola Barracudas (2000–2002)

Home fields
- Pensacola Civic Center (2000–2002)

League / conference affiliations
- af2 (2000–2002): National Conference (2000); American Conference (2001); Southeastern Division (2001); National Conference (2002); Southern Division (2002)

Playoff appearances (1)
- 2000

The Pensacola Barracudas were an arena football team based in Pensacola, Florida. They were an inaugural member of the AF2, the Arena Football League's developmental league. They played for three seasons, from 2000 to 2002, when they folded. They made one playoff appearance in their first year. They played their home games at the Pensacola Civic Center.

== History ==
The Barracudas were one of the fifteen original teams to join the AF2 in its inaugural 2000 season. Pensacola originally played in the National Conference and won its first five games en route to the playoffs before losing to the eventual undefeated champion Quad City Steamwheelers. Prior to the 2001 season, the Barracudas moved to the American Conference. They went 5-11 and missed the playoffs. After switching back to the National Conference in 2002, the Barracudas matched their first season's record by again finishing 8-8, but failed to make the playoffs again.

The team folded after the 2002 season. The team's turf was later used by the Wisconsin Wolfpack of the Continental Indoor Football League.

== Season-by-season ==
Season records
Season	W	L	T	Finish	Playoff results
2000	8	8	0	4th NC	Lost Round 1 (Quad City 55, Pensacola 19)
2001	5	11	0	6th AC Southeast	--
2002	8	8	0	3rd NC Southern	--
Totals	21	28	0	(including af2 playoffs)	

Overall Win Percentage: .429
