= Alabama Vipers =

American arena football team

- Founded: 2000
- Folded: 2010
- Team history: Tennessee Valley Vipers (2000–2004); Tennessee Valley Raptors (2005); Tennessee Valley Vipers (2006–2009); Alabama Vipers (2010)
- Based in: Von Braun Center in Huntsville, Alabama
- Home arena: Von Braun Center (2000–2010)
- League: AF2 (2000–2004): National Conference (2000–2002); South Central Division (2001); Southern Division (2002); American Conference (2003–2004); Southern Division (2003); Midsouthern Division (2004); United Indoor Football (2005): Southern Division (2005); AF2 (2006–2009): American Conference (2006); Southern Division (2006); National Conference (2007); South Division (2007); American Conference (2008–2009); South Division (2008–2009); Arena Football League (2010): American Conference (2010); South Division (2010)
- Colors: Green, black, white

Personnel
- Head coach: Dean Cokinos
- Team president: Corey Remillard
- Owner: Doug MacGregor

Championships
- League titles (1): af2: 2008
- Conference titles (1): American (af2): 2008
- Division titles (5): South Central (af2): 2001; Southern (af2): 2002, 2003; Midsouthern (af2): 2004; South (af2): 2009

Playoff appearances (8)
- af2: 2000, 2001, 2002, 2003, 2004, 2008, 2009; UIF: 2005

The Alabama Vipers were a professional arena football team that played in the Arena Football League (AFL). For most of their history, the Vipers played as the Tennessee Valley Vipers in the now-defunct af2, the minor league for the AFL, where they won ArenaCup IX in 2008. They played their home games at the Von Braun Center. They were coached by Dean Cokinos.

The team moved to Gwinnett County, Georgia for the 2011 AFL season and became a new incarnation of the Georgia Force.

== Team history ==
=== af2 ===
The team played in af2 for five seasons, from 2000 to 2004, and during that period was one of the league's most competitive teams. The then owner and operator of the team was Art Clarkson. Then following the 2004 season the team left the af2 and joined the United Indoor Football (UIF) league.

=== United Indoor Football (UIF) ===
The team joined the United Indoor Football league as the Tennessee Valley Pythons. But after legal threats from the AF2 for using the "snake" motif, the team changed its name again, this time to the Tennessee Valley Raptors. The Raptors, after an attendance decline in Huntsville, moved operations to Rockford, Illinois in 2005 and became the Rock River Raptors.

=== Return to af2 ===
Meanwhile, the af2 returned to Huntsville in 2006. The new team, owned by HSV Sports (who also owned the local hockey team), was granted the rights to the Vipers name, trademarks, and history that had been vacated by the previous ownership. Prior to the 2007 season, controlling interest in the team was sold to Texas AF2 Holdings, LLC. The team still operated in conjunction with HSV Sports, LLC, now a minority partner with the team.

=== Alabama Vipers of the Arena Football League ===
For the 2010 season, the Vipers played in the new Arena Football League and changed their name to the Alabama Vipers.

After the season, the team's owners announced it was leaving Huntsville and moving to Duluth, Georgia, becoming the new Georgia Force.

== Highlights ==
First Game
On March 31, 2000, the Tennessee Valley Vipers traveled to Birmingham to play the Birmingham Steeldogs in the inaugural game in af2 league history. The Vipers won the game 59–18 before a crowd of 14,781 at the Birmingham Jefferson Civic Center.
Largest Home Crowd
On July 15, 2000, the Tennessee Valley Vipers beat the Birmingham Steeldogs 61–50 in front of 7,042 fans at the Von Braun Civic Center in Huntsville.
Arena Cup IX
The Vipers won ArenaCup IX by defeating the Spokane Shock 56–55 in overtime at Spokane Arena on August 25, 2008. On the road to the championship, the Vipers beat both conference #1 seeds, a league first. In addition, Arena Cup IX was the first championship game to go into overtime and it was also the first time that the road team had won the championship game. The attendance of Arena Cup IX was 10,662, which is the largest attended championship game in af2 history. In 2009, this game was voted by the league as the greatest game in af2 league history.
Win 100
The Vipers became the third franchise in af2 history to reach the 100 win mark after defeating the Florida Firecats 54–29 on June 20, 2009 at the Von Braun Center.

== Season-by-season ==
Season records
Season	W	L	T	Finish	Playoff results
Tennessee Valley Vipers (af2)
2000	10	6	0	2nd NC	Won Round 1 (Tulsa); Won Semifinal (Augusta); Lost ArenaCup I (Quad City)
2001	14	2	0	1st NC South Central	Won Round 1 (Tallahassee); Lost NC Championship (Richmond)
2002	13	3	0	1st NC South	Lost NC Round 1 (Birmingham)
2003	14	2	0	1st AC South	Won AC Semifinal (Mohegan); Lost AC Championship (Macon)
2004	12	4	0	1st AC Mid-South	Lost AC Semifinal (Florida)
2005	played as Tennessee Valley Raptors (UIF)				
2006	3	13	0	6th AC South	–
2007	7	9	0	4th NC South	–
2008	10	6	0	3rd AC South	Won AC Round 1 (Florida); Won AC Semifinals (Wilkes-Barre/Scranton); Won AC Championship (Manchester); Won ArenaCup IX (Spokane)
2009	11	5	0	1st AC South	Lost AC Round 1 (Green Bay)
Alabama Vipers (Arena Football League)
2010	7	9	0	4th AC South	--
Totals	109	65	0	(including playoffs)	

== Head coaches ==
Note: W = Wins, L = Losses

Seasons	Coach	W	L
2000	Tom Luginbill	12	7
2001	Bret Munsey	15	3
2002–2004	Kevin Guy	40	12
2006	Chris Williams	2	8
2006–2007	Milt Theodosatos	8	14
2008–2010	Dean Cokinos	32	21

== Notable players ==
=== All-Arena players ===
The following Vipers players were named to All-Arena Teams:

- FB Dan Alexander (1)
- DB Vince Hill (1)
