= Colin Johnson (American football) =

American football coach and player

Current position
- Title: Offensive line coach
- Team: Ohio
- Conference: MAC

Playing career
- 1999–2002: Ball State
- 2004: Peoria Pirates
- Position: Offensive line

Coaching career (HC unless noted)
- ?: Warren Central HS (IN)
- ?: Zionsville Community HS (IN)
- 2008–2010: Indiana (GA/OQC)
- 2011: Butler (DL)
- 2012: Wooster (OL)
- 2013–2017: DePauw (OL)
- 2018: Butler (OL)
- 2019–2024: Ball State (OL/RGC)
- 2024: Ball State (interim HC/OL/RGC)
- 2025: Butler (OC/RB)
- 2026–present: Ohio (OL)

Head coaching record
- Overall: 0–2

Colin Johnson is an American college football coach and former player. He is the offensive coordinator and running backs coach for Butler University, a position he has held since 2025. He was an assistant coach at Ball State from 2019 to 2024, serving as the interim head coach for the final two games of the 2024 season.

== Playing career ==
Johnson grew up in Joliet, Illinois, and attended Providence Catholic High School in nearby New Lenox, Illinois. Johnson's time at Providence coincided with four consecutive Illinois Class 4A state football championships.

== Coaching career ==
Ball State University fired Mike Neu on November 16, 2024, and named Johnson the interim head coach. Johnson went 0–2 as the interim coach. After leaving Ball State he received his first full-time coordinator position as the offensive coordinator at Butler. On January 29, 2029, he returned to the MAC as the Offensive Line coach at Ohio.

== Head coaching record ==
Year	Team	Overall	Conference	Standing	Bowl/playoffs	Coaches^{#}	AP^{°}
Ball State Cardinals (Mid-American Conference) (2024)
2024	Ball State	0–2 (Note: Johnson became interim head coach after Mike Neu's firing following week 12.)	0–2	T–9th			
Ball State:		0–2	0–2				
Total:		0–2					
