= Augusta Stallions =

Arena football team

Logo

General information
- Founded: 1999
- Folded: 2002
- Headquartered: Augusta-Richmond County Civic Center in Augusta, Georgia
- Colors: Red, yellow, black, silver, white

Personnel
- Owner: Frank Lawrence
- General manager: Darrell Harbin (2001–2002)
- Head coach: Mike Neu (2000); Mike Hold (2001–2002)

Team history
- Augusta Stallions (2000–2002)

Home fields
- Augusta-Richmond County Civic Center (2000–2002)

League / conference affiliations
- AF2 (2000–2002): American Conference (2000–2002); Southeastern Division (2001); Eastern Division (2002)

Championships
- Conference championships: 1; 2000

Playoff appearances (2)
- 2000, 2002

The Augusta Stallions were a professional Arena football team based in Augusta, Georgia. They were one of the 15 original teams to join the inaugural 2000 AF2 season. They started off in the American Conference, before switching to the Southeast Division in 2001, and then the Eastern Division in 2002. In their first year, Augusta went 13-3, made the playoffs, and had the best record in the American Conference. During the playoffs, the Stallions held off a very feisty Carolina Rhinos team that was looking to upset Augusta. During Week 2, however, they lost to the Tennessee Valley Vipers by a touchdown. Had they won, they would have played the Quad City Steamwheelers for the inaugural AF2 championship. In November 2000, Owner Frank Lawrence named Mike Hold the team's new head coach and Darrell Harbin the team's new general manager. Despite going 9-7 in 2001, Augusta failed to make the playoffs. In 2002, Augusta was on fire by winning 11 of its first 12 games, and made the playoffs again. This time, however, they would be stopped in the first round, this time, by the Macon Knights. Being one of the most successful franchises in the AF2, Augusta did the unthinkable, and bowed out of the AF2. Augusta & professional football was thought to be a tough combination to regroup. However, four years after the Stallions final season, the Augusta Spartans were made for the AIFL (who would later leave for the WIFL & then rejoin the AIFA as the Augusta Colts).

== Season-by-season ==
| ArenaCup Champions | ArenaCup Appearance | Division champions | Playoff berth |

| Season | League | Conference | Division | Regular season | | | Postseason |
| Season | League | Conference | Division | Finish | Wins | Losses | Postseason |
|---|---|---|---|---|---|---|---|
Augusta Stallions
| 2000 | AF2 | American | | 1st | 13 | 3 | Won AC Round 1 (Carolina 76-64); Lost AC Semifinal (Tennessee Valley 47-40) |
| 2001 | AF2 | American | Southeastern | 4th | 9 | 7 | |
| 2002 | AF2 | American | Eastern | 2nd | 13 | 3 | Lost AC Round 1 (Macon 57-41) |
| Total | | | | | 35 | 13 | (includes only regular season) |
| Total | | | | | 1 | 2 | (includes only the postseason) |
| Total | | | | | 36 | 15 | (includes both regular season and postseason) |

== Gallery ==
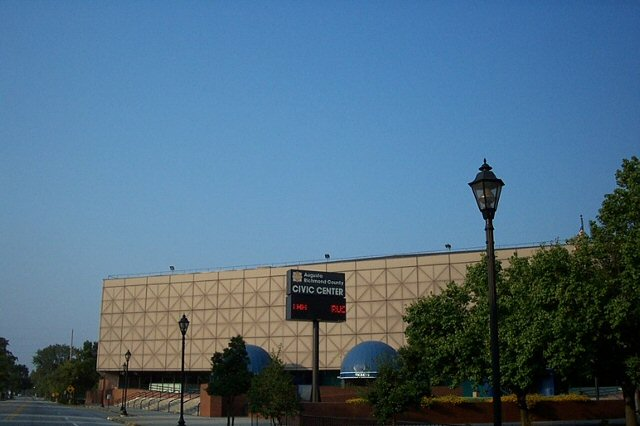
Augusta-Richmond County Civic Center in 2005, essentially as it appeared during tenure of Augusta Stallions
