= Frank Haege =

American football coach (born 1968)

- Haege at Augsburg, 2018

Current position
- Title: Special teams coordinator, defensive backs coach
- Team: Solon HS (IA)

Biographical details
- Born: October 11, 1968 (age 58); Two Rivers, Wisconsin, U.S.

Playing career
- 1988–1991: Wisconsin–Stout
- Position: Tight end

Coaching career (HC unless noted)
- 1992–1995: Bemidji State (assistant)
- 1994: Milwaukee Mustangs (ST/TE)
- 1996: Augsburg (WR)
- 1996: Minnesota Fighting Pike (DC)
- 1997–1998: Augsburg (OC)
- 1997–1999: New Jersey Red Dogs (DC/DB)
- 2000–2001: Quad City Steamwheelers
- 2002–2004: New Jersey Gladiators
- 2005–2019: Augsburg
- 2021–present: Solon HS (IA) (STC/DB)

Head coaching record
- Overall: 57–93 (college); 37–1 (af2); 25–23 (AFL)

Accomplishments and honors

Championships
- 2 ArenaCup (2000–2001); AFL East (2002)

Frank Haege (born October 11, 1968) is an American football coach. He is the special teams coordinator and defensive backs coach at Solon High School in Solon, Iowa. Haege served as the head football coach at Augsburg University in Minneapolis from 2005 to 2019. He was also the head coach for the Quad City Steamwheelers of AF2 from 2000 to 2001 and the New Jersey Gladiators the Arena Football League from 2002 to 2004.

== Arena football ==
While in the Arena Football League, he was an assistant coach for the Milwaukee Mustangs in 1994, the Minnesota Fighting Pike in 1996, and the New Jersey Red Dogs from 1997 through 1999. In 2000, Haege became the head coach of the Quad City Steamwheelers of the af2, which is the Arena Football League's developmental league. In his two seasons as head coach of the Steamwheelers, they compiled a 37–1 record and won back to back ArenaCup championships. In 2002, Haege left the Steamwheelers to become the head coach of the New Jersey Gladiators (later the Las Vegas Gladiators) of the Arena Football League. Haege set an AFL record for best turnaround of an AFL team. He took over a 2–12 (2001) team and led them to a record of 9–5 in 2002. The 2002 Gladiators also made it to the second round of the AFL playoffs. The Gladiators went 8–8 and made the playoffs in 2003. They also went 8–8 in 2004.

In March 2024, Haege returned to the indoor game. This time as general manager of the Coralville Chaos of American Indoor Football.

== College football ==
Haege spent four years as an assistant football coach at Bemidji State University from 1992 to 1995, and was the offensive coordinator from 1996 to 1998 at Augsburg University in Minneapolis. Haege became head coach of Augsburg in 2005 and remained the head coach through the end of the 2019 season, compiling a record of 57–93. In 2020, Haege became the first recreation director in Tiffin, Iowa.

== Family ==
A native of Virginia, Minnesota, Haege is the son of football coach Art Haege, who is known for his time with the Iowa Barnstormers of the Arena Football League. Haege and his wife, Michele, have three sons, Frank Jr., M. J. and A. J.

== Head coaching record ==
=== Professional ===
Team	Year	Regular season				Postseason			
Team	Year	Won	Lost	Win %	Finish	Won	Lost	Win %	Result
QC	2000	16	0	1.000	af2 champions	3	0	1.000	Beat Tennessee Valley Vipers in ArenaCup
QC	2001	15	1	.938	af2 champions	3	0	1.000	Beat Richmond Speed in ArenaCup
QC Total		37	1	.974	-	6	0	1.000	
NJ	2002	9	5	.642	1st in AFL East	1	1	.50	Lost to Orlando Predators in semifinals
LV	2003	8	8	.500	3rd in AFL East	0	1	.0	Lost to Arizona Rattlers in first round
LV	2003	8	8	.500	3rd AFL West				
NJ/LV Total		25	23	.521					
Total		62	24	.721					

=== College ===
Year	Team	Overall	Conference	Standing	Bowl/playoffs
Augsburg Auggies (Minnesota Intercollegiate Athletic Conference) (2005–2019)
2005	Augsburg	1–9	1–7	T–8th	
2006	Augsburg	1–9	1–7	T–8th	
2007	Augsburg	5–5	3–5	T–5th	
2008	Augsburg	5–5	3–5	8th	
2009	Augsburg	4–6	3–5	T–4th	
2010	Augsburg	4–6	2–6	T–7th	
2011	Augsburg	6–4	4–4	T–5th	
2012	Augsburg	7–3	5–3	T–4th	
2013	Augsburg	5–5	3–5	T–6th	
2014	Augsburg	4–6	3–5	6th	
2015	Augsburg	5–5	4–4	T–5th	
2016	Augsburg	2–8	2–6	7th	
2017	Augsburg	4–6	2–6	7th	
2018	Augsburg	2–8	0–8	9th	
2019	Augsburg	2–8	1–7	8th	
Augsburg:		57–93	37–83		
Total:		57–93			
