= Quad City Steamwheelers =

Arena football team

- Established 1999; Folded 2009; Played in iWireless Center in Moline, Illinois

League/conference affiliations
- AF2 (2000–2009): National Conference (2000–2005); American Conference (2006–2009); Midwestern Division (2001–2005); Eastern Division (2006); Midwest Division (2007–2009)
- Current uniform
- Team colors: Navy blue, gold and scarlet red
- Mascot: Steamwheeler Willie

Personnel
- Owner(s): Jim Foster
- Head coach: Frank Haege (2000–2001); Rich Ingold (2002–2004); Rick Frazier (2004–2006); Sean Ponder (2007); Troy Biladeau (2008–2009)

Team history
- Quad City Steamwheelers (2000–2009)

Championships
- League championships (2); 2000, 2001
- Conference championships (2); 2000, 2001
- Division championships (3); 2001, 2003, 2004

Playoff appearances (7)
- 2000, 2001, 2003, 2004, 2005, 2007, 2008

Home arena(s)
- iWireless Center (2000–2009)

The Quad City Steamwheelers were a professional arena football team. They were a charter member of the AF2 and played their home games at iWireless Center in Moline, Illinois.

The team was founded on September 1, 1999, when the Quad Cities was awarded an arena football franchise. Managing owner (and inventor of arena football) Jim Foster coined the team's nickname.

In December 2009, it was confirmed that the Steamwheelers had ceased operations, opting not to join the new Arena Football League after the bankruptcy of the Arena Football League and subsequent disbanding of af2.

== Team history ==
=== Back-to-back ArenaCup wins ===
The Steamwheelers played their inaugural season in 2000 and dominated the league for its first two seasons. They went undefeated in 2000 behind coach Frank Haege, even winning one game by a score of 103-3 over Greensboro in Greensboro, en route to capturing the first-ever ArenaCup Championship. In 2001, the Steamwheelers nearly repeated that accomplishment by finishing 18-1 and winning a second-straight league title. During this two season span, the Steamwheelers set a record for the longest winning streak in the af2 at 24 consecutive wins.

=== Banned from 2002 playoffs ===
Allegations of rules violations plagued the Steamwheelers during the second season and they were eventually banned from the 2002 playoffs for salary cap violations under Haege.

=== Second coach ===
Coached by Rich Ingold from 2002–2004, the Steamwheelers were still successful as they clinched two more division titles. However, the team failed to win any additional league championships and lost 14 games over that three-year span. Ingold left the Steamwheelers after the 2004 season and was replaced by Rick Frazier, former coach for the Milwaukee Mustangs of the Arena Football League.

The 2006 season, under coach Frazier, was the first losing season for the franchise in its history.

=== New ownership and the search for a new league ===
In October 2006, the league awarded the right to operate the franchise to a new ownership group. The resulting change in ownership oversaw the change in team leadership from Frazier to new head coach Sean Ponder. Ponder was the team's offensive coordinator during the 2006 season. In 2009, the tenth and final af2 season, the Steamwheelers had their second losing season in franchise history.

With the folding of af2 in 2009, the Steamwheelers considered joining Indoor Football League and the newly re-formed Arena Football League. They opted to cease operations instead.

In 2018, a new Steamwheelers' team returned, but were not under the same operations as the previous team.

== Season-by-season ==
Season records
Season	W	L	T	Finish	Playoff results
2000	16	0	0	1st NC	Won Round 1 (Pensacola 55–19); Won Semifinal (Norfolk 75–27); Won ArenaCup I (Tennessee Valley 68–59)
2001	15	1	0	1st NC Midwest	Won Round 1 (Macon 80–55); Won Semifinal (Carolina 35–16); Won ArenaCup II (Richmond 55–51)
2002	10	6	0	2nd NC Midwest	Banned from playoffs
2003	14	2	0	1st NC Midwest	Lost NC Semifinal (Arkansas 63–61)
2004	10	6	0	1st NC Midwest	Lost NC Round 1 (Louisville 53–48)
2005	9	7	0	3rd NC Midwest	Lost NC Round 1 (Rio Grande Valley 56–38)
2006	7	9	0	5th AC East	Did not qualify
2007	10	6	0	1st AC Midwest	Lost AC Round 1 (Green Bay 39–34)
2008	8	8	0	3rd AC Midwest	Lost AC Round 1 (Wilkes-Barre/Scranton 57–29)
2009	5	11	0	3rd AC Midwest	Did not qualify
Totals	108	53	0	(including playoffs)	
