= Norfolk Nighthawks =

Arena football team

Logo

General information
- Founded: 1999
- Folded: 2003
- Headquartered: Norfolk Scope in Norfolk, Virginia
- Colors: Blue, gold, white

Team history
- Norfolk Nighthawks (2000–2003)

Home fields
- Norfolk Scope (2000–2003)

League / conference affiliations
- af2 (2000–2003): American Conference (2000–2003); Eastern Division (2001); Atlantic Division (2002–2003)

Playoff appearances (1)
- 2000

The Norfolk Nighthawks were a charter member of the AF2. They played their home games at The Norfolk Scope Arena in Norfolk, Virginia. After a very impressive inaugural season, the Nighthawks never made it back to the playoffs and ceased all operations after the 2003 Af2 season. The Nighthawks coaches were: Deatrich Wise (2000–01), Mike Buck (2002), and Rick Frazier (2003). The assistant coaches were: Ron Hill, Offensive Coordinator, Ed Cunningham, Line coach, Keith Easley, Defence and Quality Control. The primary owners were Kenny Easley, Jr. (2000–03) and Bruce Smith (2000-03). Billy Mann served the team as General Manager, Patricia Easley and Adianna Manzella were the front office leaders. Corporate Sales was covered by Don Mears, Sr.

== Season-by-season ==
Season records
Season	W	L	T	Finish	Playoff results
2000	11	7	0	2nd AC	Won Round 1 (Norfolk 41, Jacksonville 28); Lost Semifinals (Quad City 75, Norfolk 27)
2001	8	8	0	3rd AC Northeast	--
2002	8	8	0	3rd AC Atlantic	--
2003	8	8	0	3rd AC Atlantic	--
Totals	35	31	0	(including playoffs)	
