= 2007 Wilkes-Barre/Scranton Pioneers season =

The 2007 Wilkes-Barre/Scranton Pioneers season was the team's sixth season as a member of the af2. Under coach Rich Ingold and led by quarterback Ryan Vena, the Pioneers advanced to their fourth straight playoff appearance, winning three games at home to earn a spot in the ArenaCup. The Pioneers lost the championship to the Tulsa Talons 73–66 after the Pioneers' final pass play in the waning seconds of the game fell short. Several members of the team were given season awards, including David Davis as 2007 Havoc Kicker of the year, Ryan Vena as Schutt Offensive Player of the Year, and Coach Ingold as Sportexe Coach of the Year.

== Schedule ==
=== Regular season ===
Week	Date	Opponent	Result	Record	Game site
1	March 31, 2007	Manchester Wolves	W 50–36	1–0	Wachovia Arena
2	Bye				
3	April 14, 2007	Albany Conquest	W 52–43	2–0	Wachovia Arena
4	April 21, 2007	Florida Firecats	W 58–36	3–0	Germain Arena
5	April 28, 2007	Cincinnati Jungle Kats	W 94–25	4–0	Wachovia Arena
6	May 4, 2007	Manchester Wolves	W 59–42	5–0	Verizon Wireless Arena
7	May 12, 2007	Mahoning Valley Thunder	W 56–26	6–0	Chevrolet Centre
8	May 19, 2007	Tennessee Valley Vipers	W 34–30	7–0	Von Braun Center
9	May 25, 2007	Albany Conquest	W 71–46	8–0	Wachovia Arena
10	Bye				
11	June 9, 2007	South Georgia Wildcats	W 40–62	9–0	Albany Civic Center
12	June 16, 2007	Alabama Steeldogs	W 77–62	10–0	Wachovia Arena
13	June 22, 2007	Quad City Steamwheelers	W 62–55	11–1	iWireless Center
14	June 30, 2007	Mahoning Valley Thunder	W 51–40	12–0	Wachovia Arena
15	July 7, 2007	Fort Wayne Fusion	W 48–47	13–0	Allen County War Memorial Coliseum
16	July 13, 2007	Manchester Wolves	L 49–46	13–1	Verizon Wireless Arena
17	July 21, 2007	Bossier–Shreveport Battle Wings	W 50–28	14–1	CenturyTel Center
18	July 27, 2007	Albany Conquest	L 56–42	14–2	Times Union Center

=== Postseason ===
Week	Date	Opponent	Result	Record	Game site
1	August 4, 2007	Tri-Cities Fever	W 57–54	1–0	Wachovia Arena
2	August 11, 2007	Central Valley Coyotes	W 70–53	2–0	Wachovia Arena
3	August 18, 2007	Green Bay Blizzard	W 46–43	3–0	Wachovia Arena
4	August 25, 2007	Tulsa Talons	L 73–66	3–1	CenturyTel Center

== Final standings ==
American Conference East Division
Team	Overall			Division		
Team	Wins	Losses	Percentage	Wins	Losses	Percentage
Wilkes-Barre/Scranton Pioneers	14	2	0.875	6	2	0.750
Manchester Wolves	10	6	0.625	6	2	0.750
Mahoning Valley Thunder	7	9	0.437	2	4	0.250
Albany Conquest	6	10	0.375	1	7	0.125

== Attendance ==
Week	Opponent	Attendance
1	Manchester Wolves	5,110
3	Albany Conquest	5,014
5	Cincinnati Jungle Kats	4,645
6	Manchester Wolves	4,508
9	Albany Conquest	5,396
12	Alabama Steeldogs	6,030
14	Mahoning Valley Thunder	6,260
17	Bossier–Shreveport Battle Wings	6,248
Playoff	Opponent	Attendance
1	Tri-Cities Fever	4,645
2	Central Valley Coyotes	4,844
3	Green Bay Blizzard	5,635
Total		58,335
Average		5,303
