= 2009 Wilkes-Barre/Scranton Pioneers season =

Arena football season

- Owner: Cosmo DeNicola
- General manager: Joe Shaughnessy
- Head coach: Rich Ingold
- Home stadium: Wachovia Arena at Casey Plaza

Results
- Record: 13–3
- Division place: 2nd NC West
- Playoffs: Won First Round 78–21 (Firebirds); Won American Conference Semifinals 82–49 (Horsemen); Won American Conference Championship 72–67 (Blizzard); Lost ArenaCup X 27–74 (Shock)

The 2009 Wilkes-Barre/Scranton Pioneers season was the team's eighth season of arena football. The Pioneers made another attempt to return to the ArenaCup after falling out of the playoff race for ArenaCup IX. The team signed many key players from the 2008 campaign, including quarterback Ryan Vena and defensive lineman Alan Barnes.

The Pioneers returned to the ArenaCup, but lost to the Spokane Shock 74–27.

== Rosters ==
=== Training camp ===
Wilkes-Barre/Scranton Pioneers 2009 training camp roster
Quarterbacks: 15 Joe DeLuise; 5 Ryan Vena; Receivers: Irving Campbell; James Lukowiak; 4 Rich Musinski; 9 J. J. Outlaw; Jarrett Smith; Kickers: 3 David Davis	Offensive linemen: Mike Butterworth; 70 Jaden Volchoff; Defensive linemen: 78 Troy Blackwell; 8 Justin Parrish; Offensive/Defensive linemen: Brandon Cook; Randy Degg; Kalani Heppe; 49 Jacob Hobbs; 56 Eugene Newsome; 50 Joe Villani; Monroe Weekley; Deon McPhee	Fullbacks/Linebacker: 30 Jason Acquaye; Brett Albanesius; Matthey Brunck; Charles Bryant; 7 Kirby Griffin; Cory Lacek; 6 Darius Leak; Adam Lipiski; Wide receivers/Defensive backs: 28 Allan Barnes; LaBrose Hedgemon; Joshua Taylor; Wide receivers/linebackers: 25 Larry Kendrick; Jermaine Moye	Defensive backs: Darrell Carlton; 23 Barry Drakeford; Clay Hamblin; Dionte Henry; Raymond Lamb; 1 Micheaux Robinson; Injured reserve

=== Week 1 ===
Wilkes-Barre/Scranton Pioneers 2009 Week 1 roster
Quarterbacks: 5 Ryan Vena; 15 Joe DeLuise; Receivers: 4 Rich Musinski; 9 J.J. Outlaw; 23 James Lukowiak; 81 Irving Campbell; Kickers: 3 David Davis	Defensive linemen: 8 Justin Parrish; 78 Troy Blackwell; Offensive/Defensive linemen: 50 Joe Villani; 56 Eugene Newsome; 70 Jacob Hobbs; 74 Royce Morgan; 94 Brandon Cook; 98 Deon McPhee; 99 Keith Glover	Fullbacks/Linebacker: 6 Darius Leak; 7 Kirby Griffin; 44 Cory Lacek; 64 Adam Lipski; 30 Jason Acquaye; Wide receivers/Defensive backs: 2 LaBrose Hedgemon; 28 Allan Barnes; Wide receivers/linebackers: 25 Larry Kendrick	Defensive backs: 1 Micheaux Robinson; 22 Darrell Carlton; Injured reserve

=== Final roster ===
Wilkes-Barre/Scranton Pioneers Roster
Quarterbacks: 15 Joe DeLuise; 5 Ryan Vena; Fullbacks: 7 Kirby Griffin; Wide receivers: 81 Irving Campbell; 4 Rich Musinski; 9 J. J. Outlaw; 2 Antwun Williams	Offensive linemen: 70 Jacob Hobbs; 56 Eugene Newsome; 50 Joe Villani; Defensive linemen: 78 Troy Blackwell; 99 Keith Glover; 98 Deon McPhee; 74 Royce Morgan; 8 Justin Parrish	Linebacker: 25 Larry Kendrick; 6 Darius Leak; Defensive backs: 28 Allan Barnes; 44 LaBrose Hedgemon; 1 Micheaux Robinson; 23 Christopher Royal; Kickers: 3 David Davis	Inactive: 30 Jason Acquaye LB; 22 Tutu Ferguson; 23 James Lukowiak; 44 Cory Lacek; 94 Brandon Cook; Source: Roster Updated 2009-07-11

== Team staff ==
Wilkes-Barre/Scranton Pioneers 2009 team staff
Executive Administration
- Owner – Cosmo DeNicola
- CFO-Susan DiBrango
- General manager – Joe Shaughnessy
- Executive assistant to the Owner – Natalie Scarantino

Coaching staff

- Head coach/Director of football operations – Rich Ingold
- Assistant coach – Les Moss
- Assistant head coach and Defensive coordinator – Jake Grande
- Offensive and Defensive Line Coach – Joe DeMelfi

== Schedule ==
=== Regular season ===
Week	Kickoff	Date	Opponent	Result	Record	Game site	af2.com Recap
1	7:30 PM EDT	March 27, 2009	Manchester Wolves	W 59-28	1-0	Wachovia Arena	af2.com recap
2	7:30 PM EDT	April 3, 2009	Albany Firebirds	W 70–28	2–0	Wachovia Arena	af2.com recap
3	7:00 PM EDT	April 11, 2009	Kentucky Horsemen	L 63–56	2–1	Rupp Arena	af2.com recap
4	7:30 PM EDT	April 18, 2009	Mahoning Valley Thunder	W 80–43	3–1	Wachovia Arena	af2.com recap
5	7:00 PM EDT	April 25, 2009	Albany Firebirds	W 70–26	4–1	Times Union Center	af2.com recap
6	7:30 PM EDT	May 1, 2009	Manchester Wolves	W 53–50	5–1	Wachovia Arena	af2.com recap
7	7:05 PM EDT	May 8, 2009	Mahoning Valley Thunder	W 73–37	6–1	Chevrolet Centre	af2.com recap
8	Bye						
9	7:30 PM EDT	May 23, 2009	Green Bay Blizzard	W 69–19	7–1	Wachovia Arena	af2.com recap
10	7:30 PM EDT	May 30, 2009	Tennessee Valley Vipers	W 48–34	8–1	Wachovia Arena	af2.com recap
11	8:00 PM EDT	June 6, 2009	Tulsa Talons	L 66–48	8–2	BOK Center	af2.com recap
12	7:30 PM EDT	June 11, 2009	Manchester Wolves	W 63–34	9–2	Verizon Wireless Arena	af2.com recap
13	7:30 PM EDT	June 20, 2009	Central Valley Coyotes	W 58–20	10–2	Wachovia Arena	af2.com recap
14	7:05 PM EDT	June 27, 2009	Mahoning Valley Thunder	W 62–47	11–2	Covelli Centre	af2.com recap
15	Bye						
16	10:00 PM EDT	July 11, 2009	Spokane Shock	L 56–52	11–3	Spokane Arena	af2.com recap
17	7:30 PM EDT	July 18, 2009	Albany Firebirds	W 49–40	12–3	Wachovia Arena	af2.com recap
18	7:30 PM EDT	July 24, 2009	Manchester Wolves	W 63–38	13–3	Verizon Wireless Arena	af2.com recap

=== Postseason ===
Week	Kickoff	Date	Opponent	Result	Record	Game site	af2.com Recap
1	7:00 PM EDT	August 1, 2009	Albany Firebirds	W 78–21	1–0	Wachovia Arena	af2.com recap
2	7:00 PM EDT	August 8, 2009	Kentucky Horsemen	W 82–49	2–0	Wachovia Arena	af2.com recap
3	7:00 PM EDT	August 15, 2009	Green Bay Blizzard	W 72–67	3–0	Wachovia Arena	af2.com recap
4	10:00 PM EDT	August 22, 2009	Spokane Shock	L 27–74	3–1	Orleans Arena	

== Final standings ==
American Conference East Division
Team	Overall			Division		
Team	Wins	Losses	Percentage	Wins	Losses	Percentage
Wilkes-Barre/Scranton Pioneers	12	3	.812	10	0	1.000
Manchester Wolves	7	9	.438	4	7	.364
Albany Firebirds	7	9	.438	4	6	.400
Mahoning Valley Thunder	2	14	.125	2	7	.222

== Attendance ==
Week	Opponent	Attendance
1	Manchester Wolves	4,781
2	Albany Firebirds	5,067
4	Mahoning Valley Thunder	4,718
6	Manchester Wolves	4,913
9	Green Bay Blizzard	6,058
10	Tennessee Valley Vipers	5,472
13	Central Valley Coyotes	5,178
17	Albany Firebirds	7,050
Playoff	Opponent	Attendance
1	Albany Firebirds	2,474
2	Kentucky Horsemen	2,980
3	Green Bay Blizzard	5,863
Total		54,554
Average		4,960
