= 2008 Wilkes-Barre/Scranton Pioneers season =

The 2008 Wilkes-Barre/Scranton Pioneers season is the team's seventh season. The Pioneers attempted to return to the ArenaCup after falling to the Tulsa Talons in ArenaCup VIII, the team's first championship appearance.

== Rosters ==
=== Training camp ===
Wilkes-Barre/Scranton Pioneers 2008 training camp roster
Quarterbacks: Rod Rutherford; Receivers: Titan Mann; JJ Outlaw; Evan Prall; Prince Prempeh; Andrew Weatherly; Jason Williams; Kickers: Mark Kamphoefner; Brian Way	Offensive linemen: Zack Love; Robert Roper; Mike Sacco; Jaden Volchoff; Defensive linemen: Troy Blackwell; Kader Drame; Isaac Hilton; Deon McPhee; Justin Parrish; Offensive/Defensive linemen: David Dean; Keith Glover; Anthony Rose	Linebackers: Darius Leak; Fullbacks/linebackers: Rob Biernat; Brian Gilmore; Agean Robinson; Defensive backs: Barry Drakeford; Chris Page; Tyler Trettin; Wide receivers/Defensive backs: Allan Barnes; Dennis Bishop; Tu Tu Ferguson; Injured reserve

=== Week 1 ===
Wilkes-Barre/Scranton Pioneers 2008 Week 1 roster
Quarterbacks: 12 Rod Rutherford; 15 Matt Schabert; Receivers: 3 Coco Blalock; 4 Rich Musinski; 9 JJ Outlaw; 81 Tyreak saviour; 86 Prince Prempeh; Kickers: -- Mark Kamphoefner	Offensive linemen: 74 Zach Love; 98 David Dean; Defensive linemen: 8 Justin Parrish; 44 Isaac Hilton; 56 Kader Drame; 78 Troy Blackwell; Offensive/Defensive linemen: 99 Keith Glover	Fullbacks: 30 Jason Acquaye; Fullbacks/linebackers: 7 Agean Robinson; Linebackers: 6 Darius Leak; Wide receivers/linebackers: 25 Larry Kendrick; Defensive backs: 1 Micheaux Robinson; 22 Tu Tu Ferguson; 23 Barry Drakeford; Injured reserve

=== Final roster ===
Wilkes-Barre/Scranton Pioneers 2008 final roster
Quarterbacks: 5 Ryan Vena; 15 Matt Schabert; Receivers: 2 Bakari Brown; 4 Rich Musinski; 9 JJ Outlaw; Kickers: 3 David Davis	Offensive linemen: 50 Joe Villani; 56 Eugene Newsome; 70 Jaden Volchoff; 74 Zach Love; ?? Geir Gudmundsen; Defensive linemen: 8 Justin Parrish; 44 Isaac Hilton; 78 Troy Blackwell; Offensive/Defensive linemen: 99 Keith Glover	Fullbacks: 30 Jason Acquaye; Fullback/Linebacker: 7 Kirby Griffin; Linebackers: 6 Darius Leak; Wide receivers/linebackers: 25 Larry Kendrick; Defensive backs: 1 Micheaux Robinson; 22 Tu Tu Ferguson; 23 Barry Drakeford; 28 Allan Barnes; ?? Serge Sejour	Injured reserve: -- Robert Roper OL; 81 Tyreak Saviour WR; 98 David Dean; 98 Rory Thomas; Roster

== Team staff ==
Wilkes-Barre/Scranton Pioneers 2008 team staff
Executive Administration
- Owner – Cosmo DeNicola
- General manager – Joe Shaughnessy
- Executive assistant to the Owner – Natalie Scarantino

Coaching staff

- Head coach/Director of football operations – Rich Ingold
- Assistant head coach and Defensive coordinator – Jake Grande
- Offensive coordinator – Terry Karg
- Offensive and Defensive Line Coach – Joe DeMelfi

== Schedule ==
=== Regular season ===
Week	Kickoff	Date	Opponent	Result	Record	Game site	af2.com Recap
1	8:00 PM EDT	March 28, 2007	Quad City Steamwheelers	L 48–41	0–1	iWireless Center	Recap
2	3:00 PM EDT	April 6, 2008	Daytona Beach ThunderBirds	W 68–14	1–1	Ocean Center	Recap
3	7:00 PM EDT	April 11, 2008	Mahoning Valley Thunder	W 33–20	2–1	Wachovia Arena	Recap
4	8:05 PM EDT	April 19, 2008	Peoria Pirates	W 74–26	3–1	Carver Arena	Recap
5	7:30 PM EDT	April 26, 2008	Manchester Wolves	W 68–50	4–1	Wachovia Arena	Recap
6	6:30 PM EDT	May 5, 2008	Mahoning Valley Thunder	W 77–47	5–1	Chevrolet Centre	Recap
7	7:30 PM EDT	May 10, 2008	Quad City Steamwheelers	W 84–26	6–1	Wachovia Arena	Recap
8	7:00 PM EDT	May 16, 2008	Albany Conquest	W 69–27	7–1	Wachovia Arena	Recap
9	Bye						
10	7:05 PM EDT	May 31, 2008	Manchester Wolves	L 70–63	7–2	Verizon Wireless Arena	Recap
11	7:00 PM EDT	June 7, 2008	Albany Conquest	W 69–27	8–2	Times Union Center	Recap
12	7:00 PM EDT	June 13, 2008	Tennessee Valley Vipers	W 77–49	9–2	Wachovia Arena	Recap
13	7:30 PM EDT	June 21, 2008	Manchester Wolves	W 69–40	10–2	Wachovia Arena	Recap
14	7:30 PM EDT	June 28, 2008	Florida Firecats	W 59–56	11–2	Germain Arena	Recap
15	Bye						
16	7:30 PM EDT	July 12, 2008	Peoria Pirates	W 54–34	12–2	Wachovia Arena	Recap
17	7:30 PM EDT	July 19, 2008	Mahoning Valley Thunder	W 62–33	13–2	Wachovia Arena	Recap
18	7:00 PM EDT	July 25, 2008	Albany Conquest	W 51–37	14–2	Times Union Center	Recap

=== Postseason ===
Week	Kickoff	Date	Opponent	Result	Record	Game site	af2.com Recap
1	7:30 PM EDT	August 2, 2008	Quad City Steamwheelers	W 57–29	1–0	Wachovia Arena	Recap
2	7:30 PM EDT	August 9, 2008	Tennessee Valley Vipers	L 34–30	1–1	Wachovia Arena	Recap

== Final standings ==
American Conference East Division
Team	Overall			Division		
Team	Wins	Losses	Percentage	Wins	Losses	Percentage
Wilkes-Barre/Scranton Pioneers	14	2	.875	8	1	.888
Manchester Wolves	9	7	.562	7	3	.700
Albany Conquest	5	11	.312	2	8	.200
Mahoning Valley Thunder	3	13	.187	2	7	.222

== Attendance ==
Week	Opponent	Attendance
3	Mahoning Valley Thunder	4,889
5	Manchester Wolves	5,128
7	Quad City Steamwheelers	5,324
8	Albany Conquest	4,733
12	Tennessee Valley Vipers	5,479
13	Manchester Wolves	5,360
16	Peoria Pirates	5,219
17	Mahoning Valley	5,623
Playoff	Opponent	Attendance
1	Quad City Steamwheelers	3,905
2	Tennessee Valley Vipers	
Total		41,755
Average		5,073
