= 2002 Wilkes-Barre/Scranton Pioneers season =

The 2002 Wilkes-Barre/Scranton Pioneers season was the team's first season. The team finished with a 6–10 record under head coach Terry Karg, finishing fourth out of five in the American Conference Northeast Division; they did not go to the playoffs. Following the season, Karg resigned as head coach.

== Schedule ==
=== Regular season ===
Week	Date	Opponent	Result	Record	Game site
1	Bye				
2	April 6, 2002	Greensboro Prowlers	L 42–28	0–1	Greensboro Coliseum
3	April 12, 2002	Richmond Speed	L 72–30	0–2	First Union Arena
4	April 20, 2002	Albany Conquest	L 34–28	0–3	First Union Arena
5	April 27, 2002	Greensboro Prowlers	L 64–31	0–4	Greensboro Coliseum
6	May 4, 2002	Roanoke Steam	L 44–26	0–5	First Union Arena
7	May 10, 2002	Rochester Brigade	L 57–52	0–6	Blue Cross Arena
8	May 18, 2002	New Haven Ninjas	W 47–43	1–6	New Haven Coliseum
9	May 25, 2002	Albany Conquest	L 37–35	1–7	Times Union Center
10	June 1, 2002	Rochester Brigade	W 52–35	2–7	First Union Arena
11	June 7, 2002	Mohegan Wolves	W 49–40	3–7	Mohegan Sun Arena
12	June 15, 2002	Mohegan Wolves	W 51–26	4–7	First Union Arena
13	June 22, 2002	New Haven Ninjas	L 67–59	4–8	New Haven Coliseum
14	June 29, 2002	Rochester Brigade	L 55–38	4–9	Blue Cross Arena
15	July 6, 2002	New Haven Ninjas	W 45–28	5–9	First Union Arena
16	July 13, 2002	Mohegan Wolves	W 56–39	6–9	First Union Arena
17	July 20, 2002	Albany Conquest	L 58–36	6–10	First Union Arena
18	Bye				

== Final standings ==
American Conference Northeast Division
Team	Overall			Division		
Team	Wins	Losses	Percentage	Wins	Losses	Percentage
Albany Conquest	13	3	.812	11	1	.917
Rochester Brigade	7	9	.437	6	6	.500
New Haven Ninjas	5	7	.375	5	7	.417
Wilkes-Barre/Scranton Pioneers	6	10	.375	6	6	.500
Mohegan Wolves	3	13	.187	2	10	.167

== Attendance ==
Week	Opponent	Attendance
2	Mahoning Valley Thunder	8,200
3	Manchester Wolves	6,968
6	Quad City Steamwheelers	7,043
10	Albany Conquest	6,358
12	Manchester Wolves	5,739
15	Tennessee Valley Vipers	4,880
16	Manchester Wolves	5,701
17	Peoria Pirates	6,088
Total		50,977
Average		6,372
