= 2003 Wilkes-Barre/Scranton Pioneers season =

The 2003 Wilkes-Barre/Scranton Pioneers season was the team's second season as a member of the AF2. The Pioneers finished third out of four in the American Conference Northeastern Division with a 6–10 record, the same as the year before, missing the playoffs for the second consecutive year.

== Head coaches ==
Following the Pioneers' inaugural campaign, head coach Terry Karg decided not to renew his contract with the team. Larry Kuharich, a former Tampa Bay Storm coach, was hired as the team's second coach. However, shortly before the season started, Kuharich resigned and left the team for AF2 parent the Arena Football League. Dean Cokinos filled the head coaching vacancy for the remainder of the season before resigning himself, leaving the Pioneers' head coaching position once again vacant.

== Schedule ==
=== Regular season ===
Week	Date	Opponent	Result	Record	Game site
1	Bye				
2	April 5, 2003	Greensboro Prowlers	L 46–25	0–1	Greensboro Coliseum
3	April 11, 2003	Mohegan Wolves	L 41–38	0–2	First Union Arena
4	April 18, 2003	Quad City Steamwheelers	L 66–27	0–3	iWireless Center
5	April 26, 2003	Rochester Brigade	W 58–35	1–3	First Union Arena
6	May 5, 2003	Albany Conquest	L 68–49	1–4	Times Union Center
7	May 10, 2003	Norfolk Nighthawks	L 46–32	1–5	Norfolk Scope
8	May 16, 2003	Norfolk Nighthawks	L 49–35	1–6	First Union Arena
9	May 23, 2003	Greensboro Prowlers	W 43–40	2–6	First Union Arena
10	May 31, 2003	Richmond Speed	W 50–49	3–6	Richmond Coliseum
11	Bye				
12	June 14, 2003	Mohegan Wolves	L 55–22	3–7	Mohegan Sun Arena
13	June 20, 2003	Rochester Brigade	W 54–53	4–7	First Union Arena
14	June 27, 2003	Richmond Speed	W 48–33	5–7	First Union Arena
15	July 5, 2003	Albany Conquest	L 59–58	5–8	Times Union Center
16	July 11, 2003	Albany Conquest	W 55–49 (OT)	6–8	First Union Arena
17	July 18, 2003	Mohegan Wolves	L 63–59	6–9	Mohegan Sun Arena
18	July 26, 2003	Rochester Brigade	L 41–38	6–10	Blue Cross Arena

== Final standings ==
American Conference Northeast Division
Team	Overall			Division		
Team	Wins	Losses	Percentage	Wins	Losses	Percentage
Albany Conquest	13	3	.812	7	2	.778
Mohegan Wolves	10	6	.625	6	3	.667
Wilkes-Barre/Scranton Pioneers	6	10	.375	3	6	.333
Rochester Brigade	3	13	.187	2	7	.222

== Attendance ==
Week	Opponent	Attendance
3	Mohegan Wolves	5,135
5	Rochester Brigade	5,204
6	Albany Conquest	5,419
8	Norfolk Knighthawks	4,652
9	Greensboro Prowlers	4,563
13	Rochester Brigade	4,857
14	Richmond Speed	4,513
16	Albany Conquest	5,457
Total		39,800
Average		4,975
