= Moqut Ruffins =

American football player (1984–2022)

- Ruffins in 2019

No. 93, 98, 96
- Position: Offensive lineman

Personal information
- Born: April 6, 1984; Monterey, California, U.S.
- Died: August 16, 2022 (aged 38)
- Listed height: 6 ft 5 in (1.96 m)
- Listed weight: 320 lb (145 kg)

Career information
- High school: Middletown South (Middletown, New Jersey)
- College: Louisiana Tech
- NFL draft: 2006: undrafted

Career history
- Lakeland Thunderbolts (2006); Laredo Lobos (2007); Lubbock Renegades (2007–2008); Bossier–Shreveport Battle Wings (2009–2010); New Orleans VooDoo (2011); Pittsburgh Power (2012); San Antonio Talons (2013–2014); Jacksonville Sharks (2015–2017); Washington Valor (2017)*; Albany Empire (AFL) (2018–2019); Albany Empire (NAL) (2021)
- * Offseason or practice squad member only

Awards and highlights
- ArenaBowl champion (2019); NAL champion (2017); First-team All-Arena (2015); First-team National Conference All-af2 (2009); First-team All-NAL (2017); First-team All-WAC (2005)

Career AFL statistics
- Receptions: 66
- Receiving yards: 636
- Receiving TDs: 22
- Tackles: 33
- Stats at ArenaFan.com

Moqut Ruffins (April 6, 1984 – August 16, 2022) was an American professional football player who was an offensive lineman for nine seasons in the Arena Football League (AFL) from 2010 to 2019 with the Bossier–Shreveport Battle Wings, New Orleans VooDoo, Pittsburgh Power, San Antonio Talons, Jacksonville Sharks, and Albany Empire. He played college football for the Louisiana Tech Bulldogs. He also played in the National Indoor Football League with the Lakeland Thunderbolts; in the af2 with the Laredo Lobos, Lubbock Renegades, and Bossier–Shreveport Battle Wings; and in the National Arena League (NAL) with the Jacksonville Sharks and Albany Empire.

== Early life ==
Ruffins was born in Monterey, California. He played high school football at Middletown High School South in Middletown Township, New Jersey and helped the team win Central Jersey Group 3 titles in 2000 and 2001. He also played basketball in high school.

== College career ==
Ruffins played for the Louisiana Tech Bulldogs from 2002 to 2005. He accumulated career totals of 79 tackles, nine tackles for a loss and three sacks. He earned first-team All-WAC honors his senior season in 2005 after recording 38 tackles, seven tackles for a loss, three sacks and two forced fumbles. Ruffins was named the WAC Defensive Player of the Week in October 2005 after sacking quarterback Colt Brennan twice and recovering a fumble in a 46–14 win over the Hawaii Rainbow Warriors.

== Professional career ==
Ruffins played for the Lakeland Thunderbolts of the National Indoor Football League in 2006.

Ruffins played in one game for the Laredo Lobos of the af2 in 2007.

Ruffins was assigned to the Lubbock Renegades of the af2 on April 27, 2007. He played in nine games for the Renegades during the 2007 season, recording ten tackles, a sack, three pass breakups, two forced fumbles and a blocked kick. He was assigned to the Renegades on December 12, 2007 and played for the team in 2008.

Ruffins played for the Bossier–Shreveport Battle Wings of the af2 in 2009, earning first-team National Conference All-af2 honors. The Battle Wings moved to the AFL in 2010, where Ruffins recorded fourteen total tackles, one forced fumble and seven receptions for 54 yards and two touchdowns as a two-way lineman.

Ruffins was assigned to the New Orleans VooDoo of the Arena Football League (AFL) on September 23, 2010. He caught four passes for 39 yards and two touchdowns for the VooDoo during the 2011 season.

Ruffins was assigned to the AFL's Pittsburgh Power on January 30, 2012. He recorded five receptions for 41 yards and two touchdowns for the Power in 2012.

Ruffins was assigned to the San Antonio Talons of the AFL on January 10, 2013. He caught sixteen passes for 181 yards and five touchdowns in seventeen games for the Talons during the 2013 season. He accumulated nineteen receptions for 151 yards and five touchdowns in sixteen games for the team in 2014.

Ruffins was assigned to the AFL's Jacksonville Sharks on March 5, 2015. He earned first-team All-Arena honors in 2015 after starting sixteen games on the offensive line of the Sharks and catching seven passes for 71 yards and three touchdowns. He played in 15 games, all starts, in 2016, catching 5 passes for 65 yards and 2 touchdowns. On March 6, 2017, Ruffins signed with the Sharks for the 2017 National Arena League (NAL) season. He earned first-team All-NAL honors in 2017 after playing in 8 games and catching 3 passes for 54 yards and 1 touchdown. On August 18, 2017, he signed with the Sharks for the 2018 season.

On October 14, 2016, Ruffins was selected by the Washington Valor during the AFL dispersal draft.

On June 7, 2018, Ruffins was assigned to the Albany Empire of the AFL. On March 7, 2019, Ruffins was assigned to the Empire again. On August 11, 2019, the Empire won ArenaBowl XXXII against the Philadelphia Soul by a score of 45–27. The AFL folded after the 2019 season.

Ruffins signed with the Albany Empire of the NAL on July 13, 2021.

== Death ==
Ruffins died on August 16, 2022, at the age of 38.
