= C. J. Brewer (wide receiver) =

American football player (born 1984)

No. 14
- Position: Wide receiver

Personal information
- Born: May 12, 1982 (age 44); Denver, Colorado, U.S.
- Listed height: 6 ft 2 in (1.88 m)
- Listed weight: 210 lb (95 kg)

Career information
- High school: South (Denver, Colorado)
- College: Wyoming
- NFL draft: 2006: undrafted

Career history
- San Francisco 49ers (2006–2007); Mahoning Valley Thunder (2009); Albany Firebirds (2009)

Awards and highlights
- NCAA Division II All-American (2003); All-American (2004)

C. J. Brewer (born May 12, 1982) is a former wide receiver for the San Francisco 49ers of the NFL. He was originally signed by the Albany Conquest in 2005. He played college football at Wyoming.

Brewer also played in the AFL.

== Early life ==
Brewer moved to Denver and attended Denver South High School where he was a two-time All-Conference player. He recorded 21 receptions and four touchdowns as a senior. He also recorded 50 tackles and four interceptions as a defensive back, returning two of those interceptions for touchdowns. He served as a team captain as both a junior and senior.

== College career ==
Brewer began his college career at Fort Lewis College in Durango, Colorado, where he was named NCAA Division II All-American. He transferred to Ventura Community College in 2004 and was once again named an All-American. He spent a season at the University of Southern California; he then transferred to Wyoming and spent his final collegiate season there. He played in all 11 games for the Cowboys, recording 10 receptions for 106 yards and one touchdown.

== Professional career ==
=== National Football League ===
Brewer was given a free agent contract with the San Francisco 49ers of the National Football League, on May 2, 2006. He spent that season on the teams' practice squad. However, he missed the 2007 season after tearing a ligament in his right knee. He was waived by the team after the 2008 season.

=== AF2 (second stint) ===
On March 25, 2009, Brewer was assigned to the Mahoning Valley Thunder of AF2, after Being waived by the Houston Texans.
