= Buchie Ibeh =

American football player (born 1983)

No. 14
- Positions: Wide receiver, defensive back

Personal information
- Born: August 4, 1983 (age 43); Newark, New Jersey, U.S.
- Listed height: 6 ft 2 in (1.88 m)
- Listed weight: 210 lb (95 kg)

Career information
- College: Temple

Career history
- 2005: Albany Conquest
- 2006: Chicago Rush
- 2007: Wilkes-Barre/Scranton Pioneers
- 2008: South Georgia Wildcats
- 2009: Bossier–Shreveport Battle Wings

Awards and highlights
- ArenaBowl champion (2006)

Breznev Maduaubuchie Ibeh (born August 4, 1983) is an American former football wide receiver and defensive back who played for the Chicago Rush of the Arena Football League (AFL). He then played for the Wilkes-Barre/Scranton Pioneers in the 2007 season, and traveled with them to the 2007 af2 Arena Cup in Bossier City, Louisiana. Ibeh joined the South Georgia Wildcats in 2008, and played for the Bossier–Shreveport Battle Wings in 2009. He attended Temple University.

Ibeh was born in Newark, New Jersey. Prior to playing at Temple, Ibeh played two years at Hudson Valley Community College in Troy, New York.
