= New Haven Ninjas =

Arena football team

Logo

General information
- Founded: 2001
- Folded: 2002
- Headquartered: New Haven Coliseum in New Haven, Connecticut
- Colors: Black, orange-red, yellow, white

Personnel
- Owner: Charles Wang
- Head coach: Rick Buffington

Team history
- New Haven Ninjas (2002)

Home fields
- New Haven Coliseum (2002)

League / conference affiliations
- af2 (2002): American Conference (2002); Northeast Division (2002)

The New Haven Ninjas were an indoor American football team based in New Haven, Connecticut. They were an expansion team in the af2 for the 2002 season. On October 24, 2001, it was announced that Ninjas had won the name-the-team contest over Cyclones, Gladiators, Hawkeyes and ShoreDawgs. Along with the Ninjas, New Haven was joined by the Albany Conquest, Bakersfield Blitz, Cape Fear Wildcats, Fresno Frenzy, Hawaiian Islanders, Mobile Wizards, Mohegan Wolves, San Diego Riptide & the Wilkes-Barre/Scranton Pioneers. New Haven played in the American Conference of the Northeast Division. In 2002, the Ninjas finished 6–10, third in the Northeast Division. Still, that wasn't enough to play football in August. After the 2002 season, the Ninjas folded because the New Haven Coliseum closed, and the experiment for arena football in New Haven was done.

== Roster ==
New Haven Ninjas roster
Quarterbacks: 1 Chris Boden; 12 Jarrod Rouanzoin; Fullbacks/Linebackers: 92 Ryan Brady; 47 Hashim Evans; 55 LaJhon Jones; 88 Kerry Taylor; Wide receivers/Defensive backs: 4 Ryan Bland; 8 Anthony Comer; 44 Terrance Quattlebaum	Offensive/Defensive linemen: 58 Eric Bouris; 75 Charlie Cook; 66 Charles Cooley; 79 Chad Henritzy; 99 Brian Watson	Wide Receivers/Linebackers: 7 Kazmel Minott; 5 Chris Ortiz; Defensive specialists: 45 Victor Benson; 2 Damon Richardson; 21 Allistair Sebastian; Kickers: 42 Dennis Wuestkamp	Reserve lists: 3 Cy Butler (IR); 50 Steve Darby (Exempt); 7 Andre Dixon (Exempt); 95 Daniel Hayes (IR); 77 Tom Madigan (IR); 1 Phil Stambaugh QB (Exempt); 11 Eric Wise (IR); Rookies in itlatics Roster updated October 12, 2002; 20 Active, 7 Inactive

== Season-by-season ==
Season records
Season	W	L	T	Finish	Playoff results
2002	6	10	0	4th AC Northeast	--
