= Charles Dillon (American football) =

American football player (born 1986)

No. 17
- Position: Wide receiver

Personal information
- Born: January 30, 1986 (age 40); Ventura, California, U.S.
- Listed height: 6 ft 1 in (1.85 m)
- Listed weight: 200 lb (91 kg)

Career information
- College: Washington State
- NFL draft: 2008: undrafted

Career history
- Indianapolis Colts (2008)*; Spokane Shock (2009); Green Bay Packers (2010)*; Spokane Shock (2010); Chicago Rush (2011)
- * Offseason or practice squad member only

Awards and highlights
- ArenaCup champion (X)

Edward "Charles" Dillon Jr. (born January 30, 1986) is an American former professional football player. Dillon was raised in Ventura, California, and learned to play football at an early age. He honed his talents on the Hueneme High School football team in Oxnard, California. During his teen years, Charles Dillon was a star in football, track, and basketball though his heart was most in the latter. Charles Dillon was a varsity letter winner four years on the football team despite playing a wide variety of positions. Due to his athleticism, Charles Dillon was a first-team All Pacific View League pick in 2003. He was specifically selected for his wide receiver skills that season after totaling over 700 receiving yards and 10 touchdowns. Dillon played his college career at Ventura College for his freshman and sophomore year, before transferring to Washington State University for junior and senior years.

== Professional career ==
=== Indianapolis Colts ===
Dillon went undrafted in 2008, but shortly after the draft, he received a call from the Indianapolis Colts telling him that he had been signed.

Dillon had impressed the Colts, however his season came to an end fast due to an injury. He was placed on injured reserve and was cut by Indianapolis later on that season.

=== Green Bay Packers ===
The Green Bay Packers invited Dillon to attend training camp. On September 4, 2010, Dillon was released from the Packers.

=== Spokane Shock ===
In 2009, Dillon played arena football for the Spokane Shock of the af2 (the Arena Football League's former minor league). Dillon helped the Shock reach and win ArenaCup X with a victory over the Wilkes-Barre/Scranton Pioneers, winning 74–27.

Dillon signed with the Shock for the 2010 AFL season. However, while he was on the Packers' roster during training camp, the Shock placed him on its roster as 2010 AFL league exempt.

In early 2011, Dillon re-signed with the Shock.

=== Chicago Rush ===
Before the season began, Dillon was traded to the Chicago Rush. In 2011, he caught 96 passes for 1,200 yards and 24 touchdowns.
