= Ryan Vena =

American football player, coach, and administrator (born 1977)

Profile
- Position: Quarterback

Personal information
- Born: November 15, 1977 (age 48); Red Bank, New Jersey, U.S.
- Listed height: 6 ft 0 in (1.83 m)
- Listed weight: 220 lb (100 kg)

Career information
- High school: Chatfield (Littleton, Colorado)
- College: Colgate
- NFL draft: 2000: undrafted

Career history

Playing
- Albany Conquest (2002–2003); Columbus Destroyers (2004–2005); Albany Conquest (2006); Wilkes-Barre/Scranton Pioneers (2007–2009); Iowa Barnstormers (2010); Philadelphia Soul (2011)

Coaching
- Trenton Freedom (OC) (2014–2015); Philadelphia Yellow Jackets (OC) (2016)

Operations
- Philadelphia Yellow Jackets (Director of Player Personnel) (2016)

Awards and highlights
- ArenaCup MVP (2007); af2 Player of the Year (2007); 4× First-team All-af2 (2003, 2007–2009); 3× Patriot League MVP (1996, 1997, 1999)

Career AFL statistics
- Passing yards: 11,906
- TD–INT: 221–64
- QB rating: 107.37
- Rushing yards: 708
- Rushing TDs: 58
- Stats at ArenaFan.com

Ryan Vena (born November 15, 1977) is an American former professional football quarterback. Vena attended Colgate University in Hamilton, New York and graduated in 2000. Vena started his career in arena football in 2002. He ended his career with over 720 career passing touchdowns. His best years were with the Wilkes-Barre/Scranton Pioneers. He finished his career with the Philadelphia Soul in 2011.

== College career ==
Vena received several college athletic scholarships upon his graduation from Chatfield Senior High School in Littleton, Colorado, and Colgate University was where he ended up.

Vena was named to 4 straight All-Patriot League 1st team All-conference selections, and was the 1st and only 3 time Patriot League MVP.

Ryan finished his career as the Colgate and Patriot League's all-time leader in total offense with 9,435 yards. He was the first Patriot League quarterback to pass for over 7,000 yards and rush for over 2,000.

The holder of 13 Colgate records in total offense and passing, he led Colgate to three straight appearances in the NCAA Division I-AA playoffs, and four straight winning seasons.

Ryan was named to the 15th and 25th Anniversary All-Patriot League Teams as the only quarterback selected. And in 2008, Ryan was added to Colgate University Athletics Hall of Honor.

== Professional career ==
=== af2 ===
In 2002, Vena began his arena football career in the af2, playing for the Albany Conquest for two seasons and a third season in 2006. Vena had his most success playing for the Wilkes-Barre/Scranton Pioneers of the af2 from 2007 to 2009. During that time, the Pioneers played in ArenaCup VIII and ArenaCup X, and was named the MVP of ArenaCup VIII. During the regular season, the Pioneers went 41–7 while Vena was at the helm. In 2007, Vena was named Offensive Player of the Year and the MVP of the ArenaCup.

=== Columbus Destroyers ===
Vena began his AFL career with the Columbus Destroyers in 2004. Vena was the Destroyers primary quarterback, throwing 3,081 passes, 57 touchdowns, and 10 interceptions, Columbus finished the season 6–10. In 2005, he returned and competed with Matt D'Orazio all season long for the starting quarterback position.

=== Iowa Barnstormers ===
When the Arena Football League returned in 2010, Vena was a member of the Iowa Barnstormers. The Barnstormers began the year with Brian Villanueva. But in the first game of the year against the Chicago Rush, Villanueva threw three interceptions without a touchdown, and Vena came in as a replacement. He started the rest of the season, throwing 3,924 yards, 78 touchdowns, and 22 rushing touchdowns.

=== Philadelphia Soul ===
In 2011, Vena moved to the Philadelphia Soul and began the year as the backup behind Justin Allgood. But after the Soul started the year 1–3, Vena replaced Allgood as the team's starter, and finished out the season and broke the record for most rushing touchdowns in a season by a quarterback at the time, with 23.

=== AFL statistics ===
Legend
	Led the league
**Bold**	Career high

Year	Team	Passing							Rushing		
Year	Team	Cmp	Att	Pct	Yds	TD	Int	Rtg	Att	Yds	TD
2004	Columbus	238	377	63.1	3,081	57	10	**115.49**	65	226	14
2005	Columbus	88	147	59.9	1,061	16	9	83.74	17	49	2
2010	Iowa	**317**	**498**	**63.7**	**3,924**	**78**	**23**	107.87	**80**	**272**	**22**
2011	Philadelphia	276	448	61.6	3,840	70	22	107.74	54	161	20
Career		919	1,470	62.5	11,906	221	64	107.37	216	708	58
