= Wilkes-Barre/Scranton Mavericks =

American indoor football team

Logo

General information
- Founded: 2024; 2 years ago
- Folded: 2025
- Headquartered: Mohegan Arena at Casey Plaza in Wilkes-Barre Township, Pennsylvania
- Colors: Red and Carolina blue
- WBSMavericks.com

Personnel
- Owner: Matt Rowland
- Head coach: Shawn Liotta

Nickname
- TBA

Team history
- Wilkes-Barre/Scranton Mavericks (2025, never played)

Home fields
- Mohegan Arena at Casey Plaza (announced)

League / conference affiliations
- Arena Football One (2025, never played)

The Wilkes-Barre/Scranton Mavericks were a proposed professional arena football team based in Wilkes-Barre, Pennsylvania, founded in 2024 as an expansion team in Arena Football One (AF1). The team was to be owned by local businessman Matt Rowland, a college friend of the league's then-president Jared Widman. The Mavericks were to play their home games at the Mohegan Arena at Casey Plaza in Wilkes-Barre Township, Pennsylvania beginning in the 2025 season. They ultimately disbanded before playing a single game, after Widman left Arena Football One.

== History ==
The Mavericks are only the second arena football team to play in the Wilkes-Barre/Scranton region and the first since the Wilkes-Barre/Scranton Pioneers of the original af2 that played from 2002 to 2009, playing in two ArenaCup title games losing to the Tulsa Talons in 2007 and the Spokane Shock in 2009.

Introductary logo

Fifteen years after the Pioneers played their final game in Wilkes-Barre, Arena Football One, (a reorganized offshoot of the failed second revival of the Arena Football League) granted an expansion franchise to local owner Matt Rowland, a graduate of Misericordia University, a private Catholic university in Dallas, Pennsylvania. In a press released posted by AF1, they were quoted as describing Rowland as an "extensive experience as an innovative boxing promoter and has several large boxing cards to his credit." The team will play their home games starting in the 2025 season at the Mohegan Sun Arena at Casey Plaza in the Wilkes-Barre Township. League president Jared Widman was quoted to say, “The (Mohegan) Sun Arena has been wonderful to work with. Bringing arena football back to Wilkes-Barre, it is something that is exciting and the league is happy about.” Rowland and Widman were college classmates at Misericordia and teammates on that school's lacrosse team.

The team was to play in the AF1's East Division along with the Albany Firebirds, Nashville Kats and Orlando Predators.

On November 21, Shawn Liotta was announced as the team's inaugural head coach. Their first-ever signee was defensive back Ikenna Ahumibe.

On December 20, owner Matt Rowland announced the team would be known as the Mavericks and their colors would be red and Carolina blue, with the official logo to be revealed later in the day.

The Mavericks held an open tryout on January 4, 2025, at Misericordia University, featuring 37 aspiring players.

AF1 announced on February 14, 2025, that the Mavericks were out of the league and would not play the 2025 season, with league CEO Jerry Kurz noting that the decision was " one of the hardest messages any organization has to deliver" and that it was necessary to "eliminate concerns" in the interest of the league's long-term stability. Widman admitted that he had largely taken over efforts to save the franchise but ultimately determined that there was not enough sponsorship money or local interest to launch the team. The team's closure also coincided with Widman leaving AF1.

== Current roster ==
Wilkes-Barre/Scranton Mavericks
Quarterbacks: Currently vacant; Running backs: Currently vacant; Wide receivers: Currently vacant	Offensive linemen: Currently vacant; Defensive linemen: Currently vacant	Linebackers: Currently vacant; Defensive backs: Currently vacant; Special teams: Currently vacant	Reserve lists: Currently vacant; Rookies in italics; Roster updated March 16, 2025; 0 Active, 0 Inactive

== Staff ==
Wilkes-Barre/Scranton Mavericks staff
Front office: Owner - Matt Rowland; Head coaches: Head coach - TBA; Offensive coaches: Offensive coordinator - TBA; Offensive coach - TBA	Defensive coaches: Defensive coordinator – TBA
