= Justin Allgood =

American football player (born 1983)

No. 16
- Position: Quarterback

Personal information
- Born: June 11, 1983 (age 43); The Colony, Texas, U.S.
- Listed height: 6 ft 2 in (1.88 m)
- Listed weight: 240 lb (109 kg)

Career information
- High school: The Colony (Texas)
- College: Central Oklahoma
- NFL draft: 2006: undrafted

Career history
- Oklahoma City Yard Dawgz (2006); Tulsa Talons (2007–2010); Philadelphia Soul (2011); Tulsa Talons (2011)

Awards and highlights
- ArenaCup champion (VIII); AFL passing touchdowns leader (2010); 2× Second-team All-LSC North Division (2004, 2005)

Career AFL statistics
- Pass Att–Com: 1,001–621
- Percentage: 62
- TD–INT: 164–28
- Passing yards: 7,417
- Passer rating: 112.58
- Stats at ArenaFan.com

Justin Allgood (born June 11, 1983) is an American former professional football quarterback who played two seasons in the Arena Football League (AFL) with the Tulsa Talons and Philadelphia Soul. He played college football at Trinity Valley Community College and Central Oklahoma.

== Early life ==
Allgood played baseball and football at The Colony High School in The Colony, Texas. He was a two-time All-District football selection and an honorable mention All-Stater. He was also a second-team All-District selection in baseball.

== College career ==
Allgood garnered 4,056 passing yards and 32 touchdowns in two years playing for the Trinity Valley Community College Cardinals. He earned first-team All-Conference honors as a freshman.

Allgood transferred to play football for the Central Oklahoma Bronchos of the University of Central Oklahoma. He was one of seven players nominated from the Southwest Region for the Harlon Hill Trophy in 2004. Allgood was the first player in University of Central Oklahoma history to throw for 300-plus yards in three straight games. He was also a second-team All-Lone Star Conference North Division selection in 2004 and 2005. He was named the Lone Star Conference Preseason Offensive Player of the Year in 2005. Allgood finished his career at the University of Central Oklahoma with 4,870 passing yards and 34 touchdowns.

== Professional career ==
Allgood was rated the 67th best quarterback in the 2006 NFL draft by NFLDraftScout.com.

Allgood spent the 2006 season with the Oklahoma City Yard Dawgz of the af2.

Allgood joined the Tulsa Talons in 2007 when they were a member of the af2. He quarterbacked the Talons to a 73–66 victory on August 25, 2007, in ArenaCup VIII against the Wilkes-Barre/Scranton Pioneers. He led the AFL with 108 touchdown passes in 2010.

Allgood was signed by the Philadelphia Soul on October 14, 2010. He was traded to the Tulsa Talons on May 17, 2011, for Rodney Wright.

=== AFL statistics ===
Legend
	Led the league
**Bold**	Career high

Year	Team	Passing							Rushing		
Year	Team	Cmp	Att	Pct	Yds	TD	Int	Rtg	Att	Yds	TD
2010	Tulsa	**350**	**559**	**62.6**	**4,333**	**108**	**16**	**114.21**	**21**	**88**	**3**
2011	Philadelphia	79	132	59.8	1,014	15	7	90.28	6	0	0
2011	Tulsa	192	310	61.9	2,070	41	5	107.86	1	2	0
Career		621	1,001	62.0	7,417	164	28	112.58	28	90	3
