= Irving Campbell =

Nicaraguan gridiron football player (born 1984)

Profile
- Position: Wide receiver

Personal information
- Born: December 4, 1984 (age 41); Managua, Nicaragua
- Listed height: 6 ft 0 in (1.83 m)
- Listed weight: 188 lb (85 kg)

Career information
- College: Georgia Southern
- NFL draft: 2009: undrafted

Career history
- Wilkes-Barre/Scranton Pioneers (2009); Jacksonville Sharks (2010–2011); Pittsburgh Power (2011)

Irving Campbell (born December 4, 1984) is a former American football player. Him and his family are originally from Managua, Nicaragua, but they later moved to Lake Worth, Florida, where he was raised. He played wide receiver for Georgia Southern and Michigan State. Campbell was signed as a free agent by the Jacksonville Sharks in 2009.
