= Micheaux Robinson =

American gridiron football player (born 1983)

No. 5, 1
- Position: Defensive back

Personal information
- Born: April 3, 1983 (age 43); Fostoria, Ohio, U.S.
- Listed height: 5 ft 9 in (1.75 m)
- Listed weight: 175 lb (79 kg)

Career information
- High school: Fostoria (OH)
- College: Otterbein
- NFL draft: 2004: undrafted

Career history
- Wyoming Cavalry (2005–2006); Orlando Predators (2007); Wilkes-Barre/Scranton Pioneers (2008–2009); Jacksonville Sharks (2010–2011); Montreal Alouettes (2011); Philadelphia Soul (2012); Jacksonville Sharks (2012–2017); Montreal Alouettes (2012); Atlanta Havoc (2018); West Virginia Roughriders (2020); Carolina Cobras (2021–2022)

Awards and highlights
- ArenaBowl champion (2011); NAL champion (2017); First-team All-Arena (2011); Second-team All-Arena (2010); Second-team All-NAL (2017)

Career AFL statistics
- Tackles: 448
- Pass Breakups: 149
- Forced Fumbles: 5
- Fumble Recoveries: 10
- Interceptions: 33
- Stats at ArenaFan.com

Micheaux Robinson (born April 3, 1983) is an American former professional football defensive back. He played college football at Otterbein College.

In 2005 and 2006, Robinson played for the Wyoming Cavalry of the National Indoor Football League (NIFL).

He was signed as a free agent by the Jacksonville Sharks in 2009.

On September 7, 2011, he was signed by the Montreal Alouettes.

On May 11, 2012, Robinson was traded back the Jacksonville Sharks for Defensive Lineman T. J. Langley.

On May 30, 2012, Robinson returned to the Alouettes and was released on June 10, 2012.

On December 11, 2015, Robinson was assigned to the Sharks for the 2015 season.

He signed with the Atlanta Havoc in December 2017.

He was signed by the West Virginia Roughriders December 17, 2019

On October 20, 2020, Robinson signed with the Carolina Cobras of the National Arena League (NAL). On March 15, 2022, Robinson re-signed with the Cobras.
