= Rio Grande Valley Dorados =

Arena football team in Texas, US

Logo

General information
- Founded: 2003
- Folded: 2009
- Headquartered: Dodge Arena in Hidalgo, Texas
- Colors: Navy blue, red, gold, white

Personnel
- Head coach: Gary Gussman (2004); Kevin Guy (2005); Marty Hammond (2006–2009)

Team history
- Rio Grande Valley Dorados (2005–2009)

Home fields
- Dodge Arena (2004–2009)

League / conference affiliations
- AF2 (2004–2009): National Conference (2004–2009); Southwestern Division (2004); Western Division (2005); Midwestern Division (2006); Southwest Division (2007–2009)

Championships
- Division championships: 1: 2007

Playoff appearances (3)
- 2005, 2007, 2009

The Rio Grande Valley Dorados were a professional arena football team. They began playing in 2004 as an expansion member of af2, the minor league to the Arena Football League. They played their home games at Obra Homes Field at Dodge Arena in Hidalgo, Texas.

They had been fairly successful in their existence including a 15–1 regular season in 2007 before losing to Bossier-Shreveport in the American Conference semifinals.

The team folded in 2009 after the af2 folded, at which point the relaunched Arena Football League (AFL) then owned the rights to the Dorados name and logo. The AFL let the trademarks lapse and a new team using the same branding was launched in 2019 as part of a regional league called the International Arena Football League. The new team, owned by Juan and Erika Arevalo, marketed itself as a continuation of the defunct af2 team.

== Season-by-season ==
Season records
Season	W	L	T	Finish	Playoff results
2004	6	10	0	4th NC Southwest	—
2005	10	6	0	2nd NC West	Won NC Quarterfinal (Quad City); Won NC Semifinal (Tulsa); Lost NC Championship (Memphis)
2006	7	9	0	4th NC Midwest	—
2007	15	1	0	1st NC Southwest	Won Round 1 (Alabama); Lost AC Semifinals (Bossier-Shreveport)
2008	7	9	0	3rd NC Southwest	—
2009	9	7	0	3rd NC Southwest	Lost NC Round 1 (Bossier-Shreveport)
Totals	57	45	0	(including playoffs)	

== Notable players ==
See Category:Rio Grande Valley Dorados players

== Rivalry between RGV and Corpus Christi ==
This rivalry started heating up when Corpus Christi became a team in the AF2, in 2007. The Inaugural game for Corpus Christi was on April 7, 2007. They hosted the heavily favored Rio Grande Valley Dorados. The Dorados romped the Sharks 66–28 in the first game ever for the Corpus Christi Sharks.

- The Dorados lead the series (9–1) against the Sharks.

=== 2007 ===
- RGV won 66-28 April 7, 2007
- RGV won 45-20 May 11, 2007
- RGV won 78-17 June 30, 2007

=== 2008 ===
- CC won 61-54 April 12, 2008
- RGV won 53-52 May 3, 2008
- RGV won 48-26 July 14, 2008

=== 2009 ===
- RGV won 40-33 March 28, 2009
- RGV won 77-50 April 25, 2009
- RGV won 51-48 June 13, 2009
- RGV won 78-51 July 25, 2009

== Head coaches ==
- 2004: Gary Gussman, 6–10 in the regular season
- 2005: Kevin Guy, 10–6 in the regular season; 2–1 in playoffs
- 2006–2009: Marty Hammond, 38–26 in the regular season; 1–1 in playoffs
