= Chatfield High School (Colorado) =

Public school in Littleton, Colorado, United States

Location
- 7227 South Simms Street; Littleton, Colorado 80127; United States; 39°35′13.2″N 105°07′55.2″W

Information
- Type: Public high school
- Motto: Charger Pride, It's What's Inside
- Established: 1985 (41 years ago)
- School district: Jefferson County Public Schools
- Superintendent: Tracy Dorland
- CEEB code: 060924
- Principal: John Thanos
- Teaching staff: 91.40 (FTE)
- Grades: 9 to 12
- Enrollment: 1,808 (2024-2025)
- Student to teacher ratio: 19.78
- Colors: Burgundy, silver, white, and black
- Mascot: Charger
- Rival: Columbine High School
- Website: chatfield.jeffcopublicschools.org

Chatfield High School is a public high school located in Ken Caryl, an unincorporated area of Jefferson County near Littleton, Colorado, United States. It is part of the Jefferson County Public Schools system.

== History ==
Chatfield Senior High School opened in the fall of 1985; there was no senior class its first year. The school's first graduating class was the Class of 1987. During reconstruction of Columbine High School, and also after the Columbine High School massacre, Columbine students attended classes at Chatfield.

== Attendance zone ==
Areas within the school's attendance zone include: Ken Caryl CDP.

== Extracurricular activities ==
=== Athletics ===
Chatfield has produced well-known athletes such as twin brothers Taylor Rogers and Tyler Rogers, LenDale White, Zac Robinson, and Katie Hnida. In 2001, Chatfield's football team went undefeated, winning the JeffCo and State Championships and ending the season ranked 11th in the nation.

Chatfield's athletic rival is Columbine High School.

=== Performing arts and other activities ===
Chatfield has been "nationally recognized as an outstanding theatre school", known for putting on ambitious productions such as Mary Zimmerman's Metamorphoses (play), in which students constructed and used a swimming pool onstage. Chatfield's Troupe #4126 has made consistent appearances at the JeffCo Theatre Festival and the Colorado Thespian Conference.

Chatfield's choir program has participated in JeffCo All County Honor Choir and the Colorado All State Choir.

== Awards and recognition ==
Chatfield's pom squad won 1st in league for the 2006–2007 year as well as 3rd at the NDA nationals in Florida.

In 2009, the Lady Chargers varsity soccer team took state.

Chatfield's improv troupe won the Critic's Choice and performed on the main stage at the 54th Thespian Conference on December 8, 2018.

== Notable alumni ==
- Dian Bachar (class of 1988) – actor
- Katie Hnida (class of 1999) – former professional indoor football placekicker for the Fort Wayne FireHawks of the Continental Indoor Football League (CIFL)
- Dalton Keene (class of 2017) – professional football tight end in the National Football League (NFL)
- Brittany Pettersen (class of 2000) – U.S. Representative from Colorado's 7th congressional district
- Zac Robinson (class of 2005) – professional football coach; offensive coordinator for the Atlanta Falcons of the National Football League (NFL)
- Taylor Rogers (class of 2009) – professional baseball pitcher in Major League Baseball (MLB)
- Tyler Rogers (class of 2009) – professional baseball pitcher for the Toronto Blue Jays of Major League Baseball (MLB)
- Tyler Sturdevant (class of 2004) – former professional baseball pitcher for the Tampa Bay Rays of Major League Baseball (MLB)
- Ryan Vena (class of 1996) – former professional arena and indoor football quarterback in the Arena Football League (AFL) and Indoor Football League (IFL)
- LenDale White (class of 2003) – former professional football running back in the National Football League (NFL)
- Jack Winkler (class of 2017) – professional baseball second baseman in Major League Baseball (MLB)
