= Jeff Hughley =

American football player (born 1985)

No. 5
- Position: Wide receiver

Personal information
- Born: March 3, 1985 (age 41); Chesapeake, Virginia, U.S.
- Listed height: 5 ft 8 in (1.73 m)
- Listed weight: 175 lb (79 kg)

Career information
- College: Averett
- NFL draft: 2007: undrafted

Career history
- Tulsa Talons (2007); Colorado Crush (2008)*; Tulsa Talons (2008–2010); Jacksonville Sharks (2011); Philadelphia Soul (2012); Tampa Bay Buccaneers (2013)*; Jacksonville Sharks (2013); Oklahoma Defenders (2014); Jacksonville Sharks (2014–2015)*
- * Offseason or practice squad member only

Awards and highlights
- ArenaBowl champion (2011); ArenaCup champion (2007); ArenaCup MVP (2007); AFL Ironman of the Year (2012); 3× AFL All-Ironman Team (2010–2012); af2 Ironman of the Year (2007); Second-team All-USA South Athletic Conference (2003)

Career AFL statistics
- Receptions: 393
- Yards: 4,700
- Touchdowns: 86
- Return yards: 6,413
- Return touchdowns: 9
- Stats at ArenaFan.com

Jeffrey Hughley (born March 3, 1985) is American former professional football wide receiver who played in the Arena Football League (AFL). He was signed as an undrafted free agent by the Tulsa Talons in 2010. He finished the season with over 1,000 and 28 touchdowns as a receiver.

== College career ==
Hughley attended Averett University. He holds the record for most receiving yards in a career or a season. He was also a great kick returner. He was named 2nd Team All-USA South Athletic Conference in 2003.

== Professional career ==
=== Tulsa Talons (first stint) ===
Hugley played for the Tulsa Talons who were a member of the af2 from 2007 to 2009, winning the af2 Ironman of the Year Award in 2007. He helped the Talons to a 2007 ArenaCup victory, earning game MVP.

=== Colorado Crush ===
After an impressive rookie season with the Talons, Hughley signed with the Colorado Crush of the Arena Football League, but he was waived after training camp.

=== Tulsa Talons (second stint) ===
During his Arena Football League rookie season in 2010 with the Talons, Hughley helped the Talons capture the Southwest division title before losing to Tampa Bay Storm in the Conference semi-finals. Hughley was named to his first All-Ironman team, a team made up of the league's best two-way players.

=== Jacksonville Sharks (first stint) ===
In 2011, Hughley signed with the Jacksonville Sharks and was a key figure in their run to capture the ArenaBowl XXIV title by defeating the Arizona Rattlers, the first in Sharks franchise history. For his on the field performance he was named to the All-Ironman team.

=== Philadelphia Soul ===
In 2012, Hughley joined the Philadelphia Soul and set the Soul's single-season record for kickoff return and combined kick return yards (1,865) and was selected to his third consecutive All-Ironman Team.

=== Jacksonville Sharks (second stint) ===
Hughley signed with the Jacksonville Sharks for the 2013 season.

=== Tampa Bay Buccaneers ===
On May 2, 2013, Hughley signed with the Tampa Bay Buccaneers.

=== Oklahoma Defenders ===
On February 7, 2014, Hughley signed with the Oklahoma Defenders.

=== Jacksonville Sharks (third stint) ===
On June 30, 2014, the Sharks activated Hughley after having him placed on league suspension the whole season.
