= 2007 AF2 season =

- League: AF2
- Sport: Arena football

Regular season
- Season champions: Rio Grande Valley Dorados

Playoffs
- American champions: Wilkes-Barre/Scranton Pioneers
- American runners-up: Green Bay Blizzard
- National champions: Tulsa Talons
- National runners-up: Bossier-Shreveport Battle Wings

ArenaCup VIII
- Champions: Tulsa Talons
- Runners-up: Wilkes-Barre/Scranton Pioneers
- Finals MVP: Ryan Vena (QB, TUL)

AF2 seasons
- ← 2006 2008 →

The 2007 AF2 season was the eighth season of the AF2. It was preceded by 2006 and succeeded by 2008. The regular season began on Friday, March 30 and ended on July 28. The league champions were the Tulsa Talons, who defeated the Wilkes-Barre/Scranton Pioneers in ArenaCup VIII.

== League info ==
New teams	Boise Burn, Cincinnati Jungle Kats, Corpus Christi Sharks, Fort Wayne Fusion, Laredo Lobos, Lubbock Renegades, Mahoning Valley Thunder, Texas Copperheads, Tri-Cities Fever
Renamed / Relocated teams	Birmingham Steeldogs → Alabama Steeldogs
Defunct teams	Macon Knights, Memphis Xplorers
Total teams	30

== Standings ==
Team	Overall			Division		
Team	Wins	Losses	Percentage	Wins	Losses	Percentage
American Conference
East Division
Wilkes-Barre/Scranton Pioneers	14	2	0.875	6	2	0.750
Manchester Wolves	10	6	0.625	6	2	0.750
Mahoning Valley Thunder	7	9	0.438	2	4	0.333
Albany Conquest	6	10	0.375	1	7	0.125
Midwest Division
Quad City Steamwheelers	10	6	0.625	6	2	0.750
Green Bay Blizzard	9	7	0.563	5	3	0.625
Louisville Fire	9	7	0.563	5	3	0.625
Fort Wayne Fusion	5	11	0.313	3	5	0.375
Cincinnati Jungle Kats	1	15	0.063	1	7	0.125
West Division
Spokane Shock	12	4	0.750	10	2	0.833
Central Valley Coyotes	10	6	0.625	8	6	0.571
Tri-Cities Fever	8	8	0.500	6	6	0.500
Boise Burn	8	8	0.500	6	6	0.500
Stockton Lightning	6	10	0.375	6	8	0.429
Everett Hawks	6	10	0.375	5	7	0.417
Bakersfield Blitz	6	10	0.375	4	10	0.286
National Conference
Central Division
Tulsa Talons	14	2	0.875	6	2	0.750
Arkansas Twisters	12	4	0.750	7	1	0.875
Oklahoma City Yard Dawgz	7	9	0.438	3	5	0.375
Lubbock Renegades	7	9	0.438	3	5	0.375
Amarillo Dusters	3	13	0.188	1	7	0.125
Southwest Division
Rio Grande Valley Dorados	15	1	0.938	9	1	0.900
Bossier-Shreveport Battle Wings	11	5	0.688	7	1	0.875
Corpus Christi Sharks	6	10	0.375	4	6	0.400
Texas Copperheads	2	14	0.125	2	7	0.222
Laredo Lobos	1	15	0.063	1	8	0.111
South Division
Florida Firecats	11	5	0.688	4	3	0.572
South Georgia Wildcats	10	6	0.625	4	2	0.667
Alabama Steeldogs	7	9	0.438	2	4	0.333
Tennessee Valley Vipers	7	9	0.438	3	4	0.428

- Green indicates clinched playoff berth
- Purple indicates division champion
- Grey indicates best conference record

== Playoffs ==
First Round	Conference Semifinals
5	Bossier-Shreveport	62
4	Arkansas	40
5	Bossier-Shreveport	50
1	Rio Grande Valley	45
8	Alabama	41
1	Rio Grande Valley	44
National Conference
6	South Georgia	59
3	Florida	50
6	South Georgia	28
2	Tulsa	49
7	Oklahoma City	27
2	Tulsa	65
7	Louisville	62
2	Spokane	35
7	Louisville	27
6	Green Bay	37
6	Green Bay	39
3	Quad Cities	34
American Conference
5	Central Valley	42
4	Manchester	41
5	Central Valley	53
1	Wilkes-Barre Scranton	70
8	Tri-Cities	54
1	Wilkes-Barre/Scranton	57

Conference Championships
5	Bossier-Shreveport	47
2	Tulsa	67
6	Green Bay	43
1	Wilkes-Barre/Scranton	46

ArenaCup VIII
N2	Tulsa	73
A1	Wilkes-Barre/Scranton	66

== ArenaCup VIII ==
ArenaCup VIII
Wilkes-Barre/Scranton Pioneers	Tulsa Talons
66	73
Head coach: Rich Ingold	Head coach: Mitch Allner
	1	2	3	4	Total
Wilkes-Barre/Scranton	14	24	14	14	66
Tulsa	17	21	14	21	73
- Date: August 25, 2007
- Arena: CenturyTel Center; Bossier City, Louisiana
- MVP: QB Ryan Vena (Offensive); WR/DB Delenell Reid (Defensive); WR/DB Jeff Hughley (Ironman)
- Attendance: 5,107

ArenaCup VIII was the 2007 edition of the AF2's championship game, in which the National Conference Champions Tulsa Talons defeated the American Conference Champions Wilkes-Barre/Scranton Pioneers in Bossier City, Louisiana by a score of 73–66.

=== Scoring Summary ===
Scoring summary

Quarter	Time	Drive			Team	Scoring information	Score	
Quarter	Time	Plays	Yards	TOP	Team	Scoring information	Wilkes–Barre/Scranton Pioneers	Tulsa Talons
1	14:30	1	37	0:30	Tulsa Talons	Jeff Hughley 37-yard touchdown reception from Justin Allgood, Luke Phillips kick Good	0	7
1	11:24	2	21	1:25	Wilkes–Barre/Scranton Pioneers	Buchie Ibeh 15-yard touchdown reception from Ryan Vena, David Davis kick Good	7	7
1	8:18	4	0	2:38	Tulsa Talons	40-yard field goal by Luke Phillips	7	10
1	5:14	5	45	2:56	Wilkes–Barre/Scranton Pioneers	Tyreak Saviour 15-yard touchdown reception from Ryan Vena, David Davis kick Good	14	10
1	1:00	6	40	3:24	Tulsa Talons	Odie Armstrong 1-yard touchdown run, Luke Phillips kick Good	14	17
2	13:07	4	39	2:12	Wilkes–Barre/Scranton Pioneers	David Dean 12-yard touchdown reception from Ryan Vena, David Davis kick Good	21	17
2	9:45	4	22	2:28	Tulsa Talons	Justin Allgood 1-yard touchdown run, Luke Phillips kick Good	21	24
2	6:43	4	43	2:16	Wilkes–Barre/Scranton Pioneers	Tyreak Saviour 9-yard touchdown reception from Ryan Vena, David Davis kick Good	28	24
2	3:48	4	46	2:18	Tulsa Talons	Andre Forde 10-yard touchdown reception from Justin Allgood, Luke Phillips kick Good	28	31
2	0:49	6	40	2:44	Wilkes–Barre/Scranton Pioneers	20-yard field goal by David Davis	31	31
2	0:21	2	4	0:11	Wilkes–Barre/Scranton Pioneers	Buchie Ibeh 8-yard touchdown reception from Ryan Vena, David Davis kick Good	31	38
2	0:11	1	55	0:10	Tulsa Talons	55 yard Kickoff Return Touchdown by Jeff Hughley, Luke Phillips Kick Good	38	38
3	13:38	2	7	1:18	Wilkes–Barre/Scranton Pioneers	Ryan Vena 3-yard touchdown run, David Davis kick Good	45	38
3	10:31	4	45	2:26	Tulsa Talons	Jeff Hughley 29-yard touchdown reception from Justin Allgood, Luke Philips kick Good	45	45
3	5:56	5	30	3:49	Wilkes–Barre/Scranton Pioneers	Larry Kendrick 7-yard touchdown reception from Ryan Vena, David Davis kick Good	52	45
3	4:33	7	45	0:40	Tulsa Talons	Odie Armstrong 1-yard touchdown run, Luke Phillips kick Good	52	52
4	11:38				Tulsa Talons	52 yard fumble recovery for Touchdown by Delenell Reid, Luke Phillips Kick Good	59	52
4	7:12	6	48	3:45	Wilkes–Barre/Scranton Pioneers	Tyreak Saviour 23-yard touchdown reception from Ryan Vena, David Davis kick Good	59	59
4	6:20				Tulsa Talons	55 yard Kickoff Return Touchdown by Jeff Hughley, Luke Phillips Kick Good	59	66
4	1:10	3	9	1:57	Tulsa Talons	Justin Allgood 1-yard touchdown run, Luke Phillips kick Good	59	73
4	0:52				Wilkes–Barre/Scranton Pioneers	49 yard Kickoff Return Touchdown by Larry Kendrick, David Davis Kick Good	66	73
"TOP" = time of possession. For other American football terms, see Glossary of American football.							Wilkes–Barre/Scranton Pioneers	Tulsa Talons
