= Mark Hamister =

American businessman (1951–2021)

Mark Hamister (October 18, 1951 – August 20, 2021) was an American businessman and the Chairman and CEO of the Hamister Group, a Buffalo-based company specializing in hotels and assisted living residences with more than 500 employees and $80 million in annual revenues.

== Career ==
Hamister was the founder and owner of three professional indoor football teams: the Buffalo Destroyers of the Arena Football League (1998–2003), and the Rochester Brigade (2001–03) and Cincinnati Swarm (2003) of the minor-league arenafootball2.

He had purchased the franchise rights to bring an American Basketball Association team to Buffalo in 2000, but was unable to secure a venue.

Upon the arrest of Buffalo Sabres CEO/Owner John Rigas and his sons for fraud in May 2002, and the subsequent bankruptcy of the Adelphia Corporation, Hamister and fellow investor Todd Berman submitted a bid to the National Hockey League to purchase the Sabres franchise. Although their bid was initially approved by the league in November 2002, Berman subsequently withdrew his financial support and Hamister suspended the asset purchase agreement that would have completed the sale of the team. The Sabres were eventually purchased by Thomas Golisano, founder and CEO of Paychex Inc.

In his later years, Hamister was instrumental in a $300 million private and public development project in the suburban Town of Amherst, New York.

He died from COVID-19 on August 20, 2021, aged 69.
