= Lary Kuharich =

American football coach (1945–2016)

No. 29
- Position: Defensive back

Personal information
- Born: December 20, 1945; Middletown, New York, U.S.
- Died: November 13, 2016 (aged 70)
- Listed height: 5 ft 11 in (1.80 m)
- Listed weight: 170 lb (77 kg)

Career information
- High school: St. Joseph (South Bend, Indiana)
- College: Boston College
- NFL draft: 1968: 16th round, 414th overall pick

Career history

Playing
- Lowell Giants (1967); Minnesota Vikings (1968)*; Lowell Giants (1968)
- * Offseason or practice squad member only

Coaching
- San Antonio Gunslingers (1984) Offensive coordinator; Oakland Invaders (1985) Quarterbacks coach; Calgary Stampeders (1986–1987) Quarterbacks coach; Calgary Stampeders (1987–1989) Head coach; BC Lions (1990) Head coach; Tampa Bay Storm (1991) Offensive coordinator; Tampa Bay Storm (1992–1994) Head coach; Connecticut Coyotes (1996) Head coach; New York CityHawks (1997) Head coach; New Orleans Saints (1998–1999) Running backs coach; New Jersey Gladiators (2001) Head coach; Wilkes-Barre/Scranton Pioneers (2002) Head coach; New York Dragons (2003–2004) Offensive coordinator; Arizona Rattlers (2005–2006) Offensive coordinator; Nashville Kats (2007) Offensive coordinator; Columbus Destroyers (2008) Offensive coordinator

Awards and highlights
- 2× ArenaBowl champion (1991, 1993)

Joseph Lawrence "Lary" Kuharich Jr. (December 20, 1945 – November 13, 2016) was an American football coach. He was the son of former Notre Dame Fighting Irish and Philadelphia Eagles head football coach Joe Kuharich and the brother of former New Orleans Saints General Manager Bill Kuharich.

Kuharich coached at Temple, Illinois State and California in the late 1970s early 80s before becoming offensive coordinator of the San Antonio Gunslingers in 1983. He held the same position with the Oakland Invaders and Calgary Stampeders before becoming the Stampeders head coach in 1987. In 1990, Kuharich became the head coach of the BC Lions. Both he and GM Joe Kapp worked to acquire big-name players, including Doug Flutie, Major Harris, and Mark Gastineau. Although Flutie played well, Gastineau only appeared in 4 games and Harris spent most of the season on the bench. After a rough 2–7–1 start he was fired along with Joe Kapp.

In 1991 he was the offensive coordinator of the ArenaBowl champion Tampa Bay Storm. When Fran Curci left to coach the Cincinnati Rockers, he was named the team's new head coach, vice president and general manager. In 1993 he coached the Storm to a 51–31 victory over the Detroit Drive in ArenaBowl VII. He compiled a 35–12 record and three consecutive postseason appearances while in Tampa. He also owns the distinction of being the winning head coach of the AFL’s only All-Star Game.

In 1995, he was assigned by the WLAF to be the Scottish Claymores first head coach. However, just days before their first game against Rhein, Kuharich was dismissed and replaced by former Boise State head coach Jim Criner.

He returned to the AFL in 1996 as head coach of the Connecticut Coyotes. The team finished 2–12 and folded at year's end. He was hired to coach the expansion New York CityHawks in 1997. He was fired after coaching the team to a 2–12 record.

In 1998 he was hired by Mike Ditka, to coach the running backs of the New Orleans Saints. He was fired during after the 1999 season. Kuharich was hired by the New Jersey Gladiators in 2001. The team finished with a 2–12 record in his only season in New Jersey. He coached the af2's Wilkes-Barre/Scranton Pioneers to a 6–10 record in the team's first season before leaving to serve as the offensive coordinator of the New York Dragons. He held the same position with the Arizona Rattlers from 2005 to 2006 before becoming the Nashville Kats offensive coordinator in September of the 2007 Arena Football League season.

Kuharich was diagnosed with Stage IV brain cancer in early 2016. He died on November 13, 2016, at the age of 70.
