= Cincinnati Jungle Kats =

Arena football team in Ohio, U.S.

Logo

General information
- Founded: 2006
- Folded: 2007
- Headquartered: U.S. Bank Arena in Cincinnati
- Colors: Black, gray, white

Personnel
- Owners: Sam Adams; Ken Griffey Jr. Dr. Timothy Kremchek; Scotty Gelt
- Head coach: Tony Missick

Team history
- Cincinnati Jungle Kats (2007)

Home fields
- U.S. Bank Arena (2007)

League / conference affiliations
- AF2 (2007): American Conference (2007); Midwest Division (2007)

The Cincinnati Jungle Kats were an arena football team based in Cincinnati. The Jungle Kats were members of the Midwest Division of the American Conference of AF2. The Jungle Kats played its home games at the U.S. Bank Arena. Their only year in existence was 2007. The team is not to be confused with the Marshals (formerly the Cincinnati Marshals), the NIFL club that was the arena's former tenant, who changed their name to "The Marshals" and moved to Hara Arena in nearby Dayton, Ohio for the 2007 season.

The team name was in reference to the city's NFL team, the Cincinnati Bengals and a tribute to the Cincinnati Zoo's tiger conservation efforts. Former Bengals defensive tackle Sam Adams, Cincinnati Reds right fielder Ken Griffey Jr., and Cincinnati Reds medical director Dr. Timothy Kremchek were the principal owners.

Tony Missick was the team's only head coach. The rest of the coaching staff included Ron Hill, Daniel James, Matt Braun, and Lamont Watson.

The team dissolved in November 2007 after completing one season.

== Roster ==
Cincinnati Jungle Kats roster
Quarterbacks: 6 James Lewis; 9 Kelvin Robinson; Fullback/linebackers: 40 Nick Ayers; 45 Kamau Jackson; 23 Joe Johnsonbaugh; Wide receivers: 80 Hassan Brockman; 4 Derin Graham; 15 Deontrae Johnson	Offensive/defensive linemen: 56 Ryan Hayslip; 50 Ike Clepper; 72 Jarvis Davis; 90 Tony Johnson; 99 Jerrod Sample; 77 Frank Straub	Linebackers: 32 Melvin Jenkins; 34 Jamar Neely; 30 Wesley Robertson; Defensive backs: 2 LeJuan Edwards; 5 Keon Mainor; 1 Demetrius McCray; 20 Reggie Perkins; 3 Desmond Washington; Kickers: 19 Jesse Obert	Injured reserve: currently vacant; Inactive reserve: currently vacant; League suspension: currently vacant; Other league exempt: currently vacant; Refuse to report: currently vacant; Recallable reassignment: currently vacant; Rookies in itlatics Roster updated April 21, 2007; 23 Active, 0 Inactive

== Coaches of note ==
=== Head coaches ===
Note: Statistics are correct through the end of the 2007 AF2 season.

Name	Term	Regular season				Playoffs		Awards
Name	Term	W	L	T	Win%	W	L	Awards
Tony Missick	2007	1	15	0	.063	0	0	

=== Coaching staff ===
Cincinnati Jungle Kats staff
Front office: Owner – Sam Adams; Owner – Ken Griffey Jr.; Owner – Dr. Timothy Kremchek; Head coach: Head coach – Tony Missick; Offensive coaches: Offensive coordinator – Ron Hill	Defensive coaches: Offensive/Defensive Line – Daniel James

== Season-by-season ==
ArenaCup Champions	ArenaCup Appearances	Division champions	Playoff berth

Season	League	Conference	Division	Regular season			Postseason results
Season	League	Conference	Division	Finish	Wins	Losses	Postseason results
Cincinnati Jungle Kats
2007	AF2	American	Midwest	5th	1	15	
