= South Georgia Wildcats =

Arena football team

Logo

General information
- Founded: 2001
- Folded: 2009
- Headquartered: Albany Civic Center in Albany, Georgia
- Colors: Blue, black, white

Personnel
- Head coach: Rodney Blackshear

Team history
- Cape Fear Wildcats (2002–2004); South Georgia Wildcats (2005–2009)

Home fields
- Cumberland County Crown Coliseum (2002–2004); Albany Civic Center (2005–2009)

League / conference affiliations
- AF2 (2002–2009): American Conference (2002–2006); Atlantic Division (2002–2003); Northeastern Division (2004); Southern Division (2005–2006); National Conference (2007); South Division (2007); American Conference (2008–2009); South Division (2008–2009)

Championships
- Division championships: 3; 2002, 2003, 2008

Playoff appearances (6)
- 2002, 2003, 2004, 2007, 2008, 2009

The South Georgia Wildcats were a professional arena football team based in Albany, Georgia. They were member of the South Division of the American Conference of Arenafootball2 (AF2).

The Wildcats joined the AF2 in 2002 as an expansion team, after the league granted an expansion franchise to Fayetteville, North Carolina. During their first 3 seasons they were known as the Cape Fear Wildcats until they relocated to Albany, Georgia in 2005. They played their home games at Albany Civic Center in Albany, Georgia.

== Cape Fear Wildcats ==
The team began as the Cape Fear Wildcats. The Wildcats began play in the 2002 season as an expansion team in the AF2. Their home games were played at Cumberland County Crown Coliseum in Fayetteville, North Carolina. They made a splash quickly in the AF2, reeling off three straight playoff berths. The team combined to go 35–13 in their first three seasons, (21-8 at home) establishing themselves as a perennial contender. They garnered an average attendance of 4,635. However, they relocated to Albany, Georgia following the 2004 season.

The Wildcats relocated to Albany, Georgia after the 2004 season. The team retained the Wildcat nickname from its earlier years. Relocation was tough, however, as the team went a combined 6-26 its first two seasons, winning just three home games.

== Notable players ==
See Category:South Georgia Wildcats players

== Season-by-season ==
Season records
Season	W	L	T	Finish	Playoff results
Cape Fear Wildcats
2002	13	3	0	1st AC Atlantic	Won AC Round 1 (Richmond 57–48); Won AC Semifinal (Albany 46–30); Lost AC Championship (Florida 43–23)
2003	10	6	0	1st AC Atlantic	Lost AC Round 1 (Mohegan 50–47)
2004	12	4	0	2nd AC Northeast	Won AC Round 1 (Birmingham 54–53); Lost AC Semifinal (Wilkes-Barre/Scranton 40–37)
South Georgia Wildcats
2005	3	13	0	4th AC South	--
2006	3	13	0	5th AC South	--
2007	10	6	0	2nd NC South	Won NC Round 1 (Florida 59–50); Lost NC Semifinals (Tulsa 49–28)
2008	12	4	0	1st AC South	Lost AC Round 1 (Manchester 46–42)
2009	11	5	0	2nd AC South	Lost AC Round 1 (Kentucky 66–63)
Totals	78	60	0	(including playoffs)	
