= Central Valley Coyotes =

Arena football team in California, US

Logo

General information
- Founded: 2001
- Folded: 2009
- Headquartered: Selland Arena in Fresno, California
- Colors: Black, red, gray, white

Personnel
- Head coach: Fred Biletnikoff Jr.
- President: Santa Rosa Rancheria Tachi

Team history
- Bakersfield Blitz (2002–2003); Central Valley Coyotes (2004–2009)

Home fields
- Rabobank Arena (2002–2004); Selland Arena (2005–2009)

League / conference affiliations
- AF2 (2002–2009): National Conference (2002–2006); Western Division (2002–2006); American Conference (2007); West Division (2007); National Conference (2008–2009); West Division (2008–2009)

Championships
- Division championships: 1: 2002

Playoff appearances (5)
- 2002, 2003, 2006, 2007, 2008

The Central Valley Coyotes were a professional arena football team and were a charter member of the AF2. As the newly forming AF2 set aside its plans for a two tier league and began focusing only on bigger markets, Central Valley stepped down and tried to play in a league which was more friendly to smaller markets; such as the Indoor Football League or the American Indoor Football Association.

The team began as a 2002 expansion member of the af2, known as the original Bakersfield Blitz until 2004. They played their home games at Selland Arena in Fresno, California (With the exception of two home games during the 2008 season which were played at the Save Mart Center due to construction). The Central Valley Coyotes were in discussions with Indoor Football League Commissioner Tommy Benezio about possibly joining the Indoor Football League in 2011. However, those plans failed and the team ceased operations in December 2010.

== Notable players ==
See Category:Central Valley Coyotes players

== Season-by-season record ==
Season records
| Season | W | L | T | Finish | Playoff results |
|---|---|---|---|---|---|
Bakersfield Blitz (af2)
| 2002 | 9 | 7 | 0 | 1st NC West | Lost Week 1 (San Diego 40–27) |
| 2003 | 8 | 7 | 1 | 2nd NC West | Lost Week 1 (Arkansas 36–28) |
Central Valley Coyotes (af2)
| 2004 | 3 | 13 | 0 | 4th NC West | -- |
| 2005 | 8 | 8 | 0 | 3rd NC West | -- |
| 2006 | 12 | 4 | 0 | 2nd NC West | Lost Week 1 (Bakersfield 45–37) |
| 2007 | 10 | 6 | 0 | 2nd AC West | Won AC Round 1 (Manchester 42–41); Lost AC Semifinal (Wilkes-Barre/Scranton 70–53) |
| 2008 | 10 | 6 | 0 | 2nd NC West | Won NC Round 1 (Arkansas 68–55); Lost NC Semifinal (Spokane 83–63) |
| 2009 | 3 | 13 | 0 | 3rd NC West | -- |
| Totals | 63 | 64 | 1 | (including playoffs) | |

== See also ==
- Bakersfield Blitz
