= Greensboro Prowlers =

Arena football team

Logo

General information
- Founded: 1999
- Folded: 2003
- Headquartered: Greensboro Coliseum in Greensboro, North Carolina
- Colors: Black, teal, gold

Personnel
- Head coach: Gary Tufford 2000-03, Steven Jerry 2003

Team history
- Greensboro Prowlers (2000–2003)

Home fields
- Greensboro Coliseum (2000–2003)

League / conference affiliations
- af2 (2000–2003): American Conference (2000–2003); Eastern Division (2001); Atlantic Division (2002–2003)

The Greensboro Prowlers were a professional arena football team based in Greensboro, North Carolina. The Prowlers competed in the AF2, as a member of the league's American Conference Atlantic Division. The franchise that was one of the league's charter members. The Prowlers had three mediocre seasons before finally getting a decent winning record in their final year. Since it was not enough to save the franchise, the Prowlers eventually folded following the 2003 season.

== Season-by-season ==
Season records
Season	W	L	T	Finish	Playoff results
2000	3	13	0	8th AC	--
2001	5	11	0	6th AC Northeastern	--
2002	3	13	0	5th AC Atlantic	--
2003	9	7	0	2nd AC Atlantic	--
Totals	20	44	0		
