= Rochester Brigade =

Arena football team

Logo

General information
- Founded: 2000
- Folded: 2003
- Headquartered: Blue Cross Arena in Rochester, New York
- Colors: Black, red, silver, white

Personnel
- Head coach: Mark Saunders

Team history
- Rochester Brigade (2001–2003)

Home fields
- Blue Cross Arena (2001–2003)

League / conference affiliations
- af2 (2001–2003): American Conference (2001–2003); Eastern Division (2001); Northeastern Division (2002–2003)

Playoff appearances (1)
- 2002

The Rochester Brigade was a professional arena football team based in Rochester, New York. The team was a member of af2, the minor league of the Arena Football League, and played their home games at the Blue Cross Arena. The Brigade began play in 2001 and ceased operations following the 2003 season.

The city of Rochester would be without an arena football team until 2006, with the arrival of the GLIFL's Rochester Raiders.

== History ==
The Rochester Brigade was one of 13 af2 expansion teams established prior to the 2001 season. The team was owned by Mark Hamister, who also owned the Buffalo Destroyers of the Arena Football League, and played their home games at the Blue Cross Arena in downtown Rochester, New York. Rochester finished its inaugural season with a 4–12 record.

In 2002, the team was slightly more successful as they posted a 7–9 mark and made the playoffs despite having a losing record. The Brigade lost in the first round to the Albany Conquest by a score of 31–26.

The team regressed in 2003 and finished the season 3–13. After the season, team owner Hamister unsuccessfully bid to purchase the Buffalo Sabres, leading him to move the Destroyers to Columbus, Ohio. With the Destroyers no longer in Western New York, Hamister saw no need to continue the Brigade team and folded it.

== Season-by-season ==
Season records
Season	W	L	T	Finish	Playoff results
2001	4	12	0	7th AC Eastern	--
2002	7	9	0	2nd AC Northeastern	Lost Week 1 (Albany 31, Rochester 26)
2003	3	13	0	4th AC Northeastern	--
Totals	14	35	0	(including playoffs)	
