= Mahoning Valley Thunder =

Arena football team

Logo

General information
- Founded: 2006
- Folded: 2009
- Headquartered: Covelli Centre in Youngstown, Ohio
- Colors: Blue, silver, black, white

Personnel
- Owners: Insight Entertainment, LLC
- Head coach: Mike Hold (2007–2009); Brennan Booth (2009); Chris MacKeown (2009)

Team history
- Mahoning Valley Thunder (2007–2009)

Home fields
- Covelli Centre (2007–2009)

League / conference affiliations
- AF2 (2007–2009): American Conference (2007–2009); East Division (2007–2009)

The Mahoning Valley Thunder was a professional af2 arena football team from 2007 to 2009.

Having entered af2 as an expansion team in 2007, the Thunder played its home games at Cortland Banks Field at the Covelli Centre in downtown Youngstown, Ohio.

The team's colors were a combination of Black and Navy Blue, with the minor color of Gray.

Single-game tickets ranged from $5.00 to $50.00.

The team sold out their inaugural home game, on March 31, 2007, to a crowd of over 5,900 fans, while their 2nd home game entertained almost 4,800 fans, on April 21, 2007.

The Thunder's first head coach, Mike Hold, went 11–26 in his two-plus years at the helm. Hold was fired on April 28, 2009.

After going 0-3 under interim head coach, Brennan Booth, the Thunder named the franchise's second head coach, Chris MacKeown, on May 26, 2009. The team ended with a 2–14 record in 2009.

Attendance declined steadily over the three years, and the owners were unable to find investors to keep the team afloat. This led to an announcement on September 9, 2009, that the team would suspend operations indefinitely. The af2 disbanded the same day.

== Season-by-season ==
Season records
Season	W	L	T	Finish	Playoff results
2007	7	9	0	3rd AC East	--
2008	3	13	0	4th AC East	--
2009	2	14	0	4th AC East	
Totals	12	36	0		
