= Rich Ingold =

American football player (1963–2017)

No. 9
- Position: Quarterback

Personal information
- Born: May 15, 1963
- Died: February 15, 2017 (aged 53); Pittsburgh, Pennsylvania, U.S.
- Listed height: 6 ft 0 in (1.83 m)
- Listed weight: 185 lb (84 kg)

Career information
- High school: Seton-La Salle Catholic (Mt. Lebanon, Pennsylvania)
- College: Indiana (PA)
- NFL draft: 1986: undrafted

Career history

Playing
- Washington Commandos (1987); Detroit Drive (1988)

Coaching
- Pittsburgh Gladiators (OC) (1989); Quad City Steamwheelers (HC) (2002–2004); Dallas Desperados (OC) (2005); Wilkes-Barre/Scranton Pioneers (HC) (2006–2009); Dallas Vigilantes (HC) (2010)

Awards and highlights
- ArenaBowl champion (1988); First-team All-Arena (1987); af2 Hall of Fame inductee (2009)

Career AFL statistics
- Completions: 355
- Attempts: 611
- Yards: 3,972
- Touchdowns: 71
- Interceptions: 19
- Stats at ArenaFan.com

Head coaching record
- Regular season: 80–33 (.708)
- Postseason: 7–6 (.538)
- Career: 87–39 (.625)

Richard Ingold (May 15, 1963 – February 15, 2017) was an Arena Football League (AFL) quarterback who played with the Washington Commandos and the Detroit Drive. He holds the all-time record for most career head coaching wins in af2 history, coaching the Quad City Steamwheelers and the Wilkes-Barre/Scranton Pioneers, whom he led to Arena Cup VIII in 2007. His head coaching career also included a partial season coaching the Dallas Vigilantes of the AFL in 2010.

== Early life ==
Ingold attended Seton-La Salle Catholic High School in Pittsburgh, Pennsylvania and was a student and a letterman in football and baseball. In football, he led his team to two W.P.I.A.L. Class AA Championships, and was an All-State selection as a senior. Ingold graduated from Seton LaSalle High School in 1981.

== College career ==
Ingold played college football at the University of South Carolina in 1981. After the season, when there was a coaching change, Ingold transferred to the Indiana University of Pennsylvania, to be closer to home. Ingold's single season at IUP was outstanding, as he set a new Pennsylvania State Athletic Conference record for touchdown passes in a single season.

== Professional career ==
Ingold made his professional debut in 1987 as the starting Quarterback for the Washington Commandos. Ingold's season stats were best in the league, earning him First Team All-Arena Honors. Ingold quarterbacked the Detroit Drive to an ArenaBowl II victory in 1988. After the league started going through financial struggles following the 1988 season, Ingold said he wouldn't play in 1989 citing, "Last year, they played 14 games at $1,000 a game plus $100 per win. This year, there's only four games and they're playing $350 a game plus $50 per win - and you have to pay for your own meals."

== Coaching career ==
Just one season after retiring, Ingold became the Offensive coordinator for the Pittsburgh Gladiators.

From 2002-2004, Ingold was the head coach of the af2's Quad City Steamwheelers.

In 2005, Ingold returned to the AFL ranks when he was named the offensive coordinator for the Dallas Desperados.

From 2006-2009, Ingold returned to af2 where he became the head coach of the Wilkes-Barre/Scranton Pioneers.

His outstanding record in af2 gave him a chance to become the head coach of the expansion Dallas Vigilantes in 2010. He was fired after a 1-5 start.

== Personal life ==
Ingold was an avid runner, and competed in both the Pittsburgh and the Quad Cities marathons. In 2006, Ingold was diagnosed with esophageal cancer and missed Pioneers training camp for the 2007 season. Ingold had residences in both Pittsburgh and Dallas with his wife Kristina and their two children, Alexandra and Richie, Jr.

Ingold died on February 15, 2017, aged 53.
