= Bossier–Shreveport Battle Wings =

Arena football team

Bossier-Shreveport Battle Wings
Logo

General information
- Founded: 2001
- Folded: 2010
- Headquartered: CenturyTel Center in Bossier City, Louisiana
- Colors: Black, silver, teal, white

Personnel
- Owner: Dan Newman
- Head coach: Jon Morris
- President: Dan Newman

Team history
- Bossier City Battle Wings (2001–2003); Bossier–Shreveport Battle Wings (2004–2010); New Orleans VooDoo (2011–2015)

Home fields
- CenturyTel Center (2001–2010)

League / conference affiliations
- AF2 (2001–2009): National Conference (2001–2003); South Central Division (2001); Central Division (2002); Southern Division (2003); American Conference (2004); Midsouthern Division (2004); National Conference (2005–2009); Midwestern Division (2005–2006); Southwest Division (2007–2009); Arena Football League (2010): American Conference (2010); Eastern Division (2010)

Championships
- Division championships: 2: Southwest: 2008, 2009

Playoff appearances (2)
- 2008, 2009

The Bossier–Shreveport Battle Wings were an Arena Football League team based in Bossier City, Louisiana. They played at the CenturyTel Center in Bossier City and took their name from the metropolitan area that consists of Bossier City and neighboring city Shreveport in the Ark-La-Tex corridor. Playing in the defunct af2 from their inception in 2001 until the league's folding in 2009 (and called the Bossier City Battle Wings from 2001–2003), the team had its best seasons in 2002, 2007, 2008, and 2009 having clinched division titles in the latter two years. They were also the only seasons in which the team had more wins than losses. In 2007, the Battle Wings clinched their first-ever playoff berth, beating the Arkansas Twisters and Rio Grande Valley Dorados before being beaten by the eventual Arena Cup champion Tulsa Talons. Despite having little success in their earlier days, the Battle Wings turned out some players who went on to appear in both the Canadian Football League and for other teams the Arena Football League, in which the team itself played for a single season after the AFL emerged from bankruptcy and resumed operations. Following the 2010 season, the team moved to New Orleans, Louisiana for the 2011 AFL season and became a successor to the New Orleans VooDoo. Bossier City was considered as a potential site for the 2024 revival of the AFL, but CenturyLink Center did not have enough open dates to accommodate a team, and thus the Louisiana AFL franchise, also named the VooDoo, was given to Lake Charles

== Front office ==
=== Dan Newman ===
Dan Newman bought the Battle Wings from previous owner Michael Plaman at the end of the 2003 season. Newman has lived in the Shreveport-Bossier City area since 1970 and graduated from C. E. Byrd High School in 1971. While Attending Louisiana Tech University, Dan met his future wife of 31 years, Mary Ann. Newman started his career at Louisiana Tech as a sports journalist. For ten years, he served as a play-by-play analyst for the Louisiana Tech University Football Network. Newman also worked as an announcer for ESPN, doing the play-by-play for college basketball games. He retired from his journalism career when he bought the Battle Wings. While in ownership, Newman served on the AF2 Board of Directors Executive Committee, the AF2 Broadcast Committee, and the AF2 Insurance Committee.

=== Butch Bellah ===
Butch Bellah was the general manager of the Battle Wings from 2007 to 2009, leading the team to their most successful seasons off the field. Butch brought 20 years of experience in advertising, sales, and marketing to the team. Before joining the Battle Wings in January 2007, Butch served as Executive Vice President of Harrison Company. Butch Bellah resigned on November 17, 2009

== Coaching staff ==
=== Jon Norris ===
Jon Norris was born in Wales Norris received a bachelor's degree from American International College and graduated from Stratford High School in Connecticut. He received his master's degree at Adams State College in Alamosa, Colorado. Norris had experience in the football community, playing for the NFL Chicago Bears, the NFL New England Patriots, the Arena Football League's Denver Dynamite. After retiring from football, Norris began his coaching career. He was the head coach for the AF2 Tulsa Talons, leading the Talons all the way to the playoffs in their inaugural season. Norris later became a defensive line coach in the AFL, but after his first season with the Oklahoma Wranglers, the team collapsed. After having minor coaching roles with two other AFL teams, Jon Norris signed with the Shreveport-Bossier Battle Wings as head coach. In 2007 Jon guided the Battle Wings to their first playoff berth in team history.

=== Jon Lyles ===
Jon Lyles was the final offensive coordinator and assistant head coach of the Battle Wings. Lyles, who is from Eastern Texas, led the Amarillo Dusters to a championship in the Intense Football League as an offensive coordinator. Lyles also played for in the AF2 for the Bossier City Battle Wings in 2001.

=== Other coaches ===
John Lewis served as an assistant for the Battle Wings. He served as an offensive assistant and special teams coach. He spent six seasons with Battle Wings. Martino Theus coached the defensive backs.

== Notable players ==
See Category:Bossier–Shreveport Battle Wings players

== Season-by-season ==
ArenaCup Champions	ArenaBowl appearance	Division champions	Playoff berth

League	League	Conference	Division	Regular season			Postseason results
League	League	Conference	Division	Finish	Wins	Losses	Postseason results
Bossier City Battle Wings
2001	AF2	National	South Central	4th	7	9	
2002	AF2	National	Central	3rd	9	7	
2003	AF2	National	Central	4th	3	13	
Bossier-Shreveport Battle Wings
2004	AF2	American	Mid-South	3rd	5	11	
2005	AF2	National	Midwest	5th	3	13	
2006	AF2	National	Midwest	6th	3	13	
2007	AF2	National	Southwest	2nd	11	5	Won Round 1 (Arkansas) 62–40; Won Conference Semifinals (Rio Grande Valley) 50–45; Lost Conference Finals (Tulsa) 67–47
2008	AF2	National	Southwest	1st	9	7	Won Round 1 (Lubbock) 77–61; Lost Conference Semifinals (Amarillo) 59–45
2009	AF2	National	Southwest	1st	11	5	Won Round 1 (Rio Grande Valley) 56–46; Lost Conference Semifinals (Tulsa) 59–34
2010	AFL	American	Southwest	4th	3	13	
Total					64	96	(includes only regular season)
Total					4	3	(includes only the postseason)
Total					68	99	(includes both regular season and postseason)

== Arena ==
The team played at the CenturyTel Center in Bossier City, Louisiana, when it was known as the Bossier City Battle Wings (2001–2003) and Bossier–Shreveport Battle Wings (2004–2010) in the af2.

== Becoming the Voodoo ==
On September 14, 2010, it was announced that the Bossier City-Shreveport Battlewings would move to New Orleans and be re-established as the New Orleans VooDoo, taking over all of their stats, records, and mascots.
