= 2009 AF2 season =

- League: AF2
- Sport: Arena football

Regular season
- Season champions: Spokane Shock

Playoffs
- American champions: Wilkes-Barre/Scranton Pioneers
- American runners-up: Green Bay Blizzard
- National champions: Spokane Shock
- National runners-up: Tulsa Talons

ArenaCup X
- Champions: Spokane Shock

AF2 seasons
- ← 2008

The 2009 AF2 season was the AF2's 10th and final season. It was preceded by 2008. The regular season began on Friday, March 20 and finished on Saturday, July 25. The league champion was the Spokane Shock, who defeated the Wilkes-Barre/Scranton Pioneers 74–27 in ArenaCup X.

== League info ==
| New teams | Milwaukee Iron |
| Renamed / Relocated teams | Albany Conquest → Albany Firebirds, Lexington Horsemen → Kentucky Horsemen |
| Defunct teams | Austin Wranglers, Daytona Beach ThunderBirds, Louisville Fire, Lubbock Renegades, Texas Copperheads |
| Total teams | 25 |

== Standings ==
Through Week 18

| Team | Overall | | | Division | | |
| Team | Wins | Losses | Percentage | Wins | Losses | Percentage |
|---|---|---|---|---|---|---|
American Conference
East Division
| Wilkes-Barre/Scranton Pioneers | 13 | 3 | .812 | 10 | 0 | 1.000 |
| Albany Firebirds | 7 | 9 | .438 | 4 | 6 | .400 |
| Manchester Wolves | 7 | 9 | .438 | 4 | 7 | .364 |
| Mahoning Valley Thunder | 2 | 14 | .125 | 2 | 7 | .222 |
Midwest Division
| Iowa Barnstormers | 12 | 4 | .750 | 7 | 2 | .778 |
| Green Bay Blizzard | 10 | 6 | .625 | 8 | 2 | .800 |
| Quad City Steamwheelers | 5 | 11 | .312 | 4 | 7 | .364 |
| Peoria Pirates | 5 | 11 | .312 | 3 | 6 | .333 |
| Milwaukee Iron | 5 | 11 | .312 | 2 | 7 | .222 |
South Division
| Tennessee Valley Vipers | 11 | 5 | .688 | 6 | 3 | .667 |
| South Georgia Wildcats | 11 | 5 | .688 | 6 | 4 | .600 |
| Kentucky Horsemen | 10 | 6 | .625 | 3 | 4 | .429 |
| Florida Firecats | 7 | 9 | .438 | 3 | 7 | .300 |
National Conference
Central Division
| Tulsa Talons | 13 | 3 | .812 | 4 | 0 | 1.000 |
| Oklahoma City Yard Dawgz | 7 | 9 | .438 | 2 | 2 | .500 |
| Amarillo Dusters | 3 | 13 | .188 | 0 | 4 | .000 |
Southwest Division
| Bossier-Shreveport Battle Wings | 11 | 5 | .688 | 7 | 2 | .778 |
| Arkansas Twisters | 11 | 5 | .688 | 5 | 2 | .714 |
| Rio Grande Valley Dorados | 9 | 7 | .562 | 5 | 4 | .556 |
| Corpus Christi Sharks | 2 | 14 | .125 | 0 | 9 | .000 |
West Division
| Spokane Shock | 15 | 1 | .938 | 11 | 0 | 1.000 |
| Boise Burn | 12 | 4 | .750 | 10 | 3 | .769 |
| Stockton Lightning | 6 | 10 | .375 | 4 | 9 | .308 |
| Central Valley Coyotes | 3 | 13 | .188 | 3 | 9 | .250 |
| Tri-Cities Fever | 3 | 13 | .188 | 3 | 10 | .231 |

- Green indicates clinched playoff berth
- Purple indicates division champion
- Gray indicates best conference record

== Playoffs ==
First Round | Conference Semifinals
6 | Green Bay | 60
3 | Tennessee Valley | 56
6 | Green Bay | 51
2 | Iowa | 46
7 | Manchester | 53
2 | Iowa | 70
American Conference
5 | Kentucky | 66
4 | South Georgia | 63
5 | Kentucky | 49
1 | Wilkes-Barre/Scranton | 82
8 | Albany | 21
1 | Wilkes-Barre/Scranton | 78
6 | Rio Grande Valley | 46
3 | Bossier-Shreveport | 56
3 | Bossier-Shreveport | 34
2 | Tulsa | 59
7 | Oklahoma City | 75
2 | Tulsa | 90
National Conference
5 | Arkansas | 36
4 | Boise | 77
4 | Boise | 35
1 | Spokane | 59
8 | Stockton | 21
1 | Spokane | 62

Conference Championships
6 | Green Bay | 67
1 | Wilkes-Barre/Scranton | 72
2 | Tulsa | 44
1 | Spokane | 51

ArenaCup X
A1 | Wilkes-Barre/Scranton | 27
N1 | Spokane | 74

== ArenaCup X ==
ArenaCup X
| Spokane Shock (18–1) | Wilkes-Barre/Scranton Pioneers (16–3) |
|---|---|
| 74 | 27 |
| Head coach: Adam Shackleford | Head coach: Rich Ingold |
| | 1 | 2 | 3 | 4 | Total |
|---|---|---|---|---|---|
| Spokane | 14 | 6 | 20 | 34 | 74 |
| Wilkes-Barre/Scranton | 7 | 14 | 0 | 6 | 27 |
- Date: Saturday, August 22, 2009
- Arena: Orleans Arena; Paradise, Nevada
- Attendance: 5,846

ArenaCup X was the tenth and final edition of arenafootball2's championship game in which the National Conference Champions Spokane Shock defeated the American Conference Champions Wilkes-Barre/Scranton Pioneers, 74–27. The game was held on Saturday, August 22, 2009. As part of the league's tenth anniversary celebrations, the game was held at the neutral-site Orleans Arena (within the Orleans Resort & Casino) in Las Vegas.

Because of legal issues regarding the ownership of arenafootball2 (the original Arena Football League had owned a controlling stake), the league legally disbanded two weeks after the game was played because of the parent's bankruptcy. AF2's board of directors formed a new entity, Arena Football One, that assumed the Arena Football League identity after winning a bankruptcy court sale in late 2009. Future championships for that league which, while "new", consists of AF2's board of directors, use the ArenaBowl as its championship, leading to the retirement of the ArenaCup.

The "new" Arena Football League began in 2010 with the defending champion Shock moving up. They went on to defeat the Tampa Bay Storm in ArenaBowl XXIII, thus winning consecutive titles in the premier level in consecutive years, with different league identities.

=== Scoring Summary ===
Scoring summary

| Quarter | Time | Drive | | | Team | Scoring information | Score | |
| Quarter | Time | Plays | Yards | TOP | Team | Scoring information | Spokane Shock | Wilkes-Barre/Scranton Pioneers |
|---|---|---|---|---|---|---|---|---|
| 1 | | | | | Spokane Shock | Harrison Nikolao 2-yard touchdown run, Brian Jackson kick Good | 7 | 0 |
| 1 | | | | | Spokane Shock | Raul Vijil 11-yard touchdown reception from Nick Davila, Brian Jackson kick Good | 14 | 0 |
| 1 | | | | | Wilkes-Barre/Scranton Pioneers | Irvin Campbell 33-yard touchdown reception from Ryan Vena, David Davis kick Good | 14 | 7 |
| 2 | | - | - | - | Wilkes-Barre/Scranton Pioneers | Royce Morgan 15 yard blocked Field Goal Returned for a Touchdown, David Davis Kick Good | 14 | 14 |
| 2 | | | | | Spokane Shock | Andy Olson 24-yard touchdown reception from Nick Davila, Brian Jackson kick Failed | 20 | 14 |
| 2 | | | | | Wilkes-Barre/Scranton Pioneers | Irvin Campbell 2-yard touchdown run, David Davis kick Good | 20 | 21 |
| 3 | | | | | Spokane Shock | Raul Vijil 9-yard touchdown reception from Nick Davila, Brian Jackson kick Good | 27 | 21 |
| 3 | | | | | Spokane Shock | Raul Vijil 14-yard touchdown reception from Nick Davila, Brian Jackson kick Good | 34 | 21 |
| 3 | | | | | Spokane Shock | Interception returned 48 yards for touchdown by Stanley Franks, Brian Jackson kick Failed | 40 | 21 |
| 4 | | | | | Spokane Shock | Markee White 19-yard touchdown reception from Nick Davila, 2-point What Pass from Brian Jackson Good | 48 | 21 |
| 4 | | | | | Spokane Shock | Charles Dillon -yard touchdown reception from Nick Davila, Brian Jackson kick Failed | 54 | 21 |
| 4 | | - | - | - | Spokane Shock | Charles Dillon Fumble recovery in End Zone, Brian Jackson Kick Good | 61 | 21 |
| 4 | | | | | Wilkes-Barre/Scranton Pioneers | Irvin Campbell 4-yard touchdown reception from Ryan Vena, 2-point Pass Failed | 61 | 27 |
| 4 | | | | | Spokane Shock | Andy Olson 9-yard touchdown reception from Nick Davila, Brian Jackson kick Good | 68 | 27 |
| 4 | | | | | Spokane Shock | Interception returned 37 yards for touchdown by Sergio Gilliam, Brian Jackson kick Failed | 74 | 27 |
| "TOP" = time of possession. For other American football terms, see Glossary of American football. | | | | | | | Spokane Shock | Wilkes-Barre/Scranton Pioneers |
