= Mohegan Arena at Casey Plaza =

8,500 seat arena in Wilkes-Barre Township, Pennsylvania, US

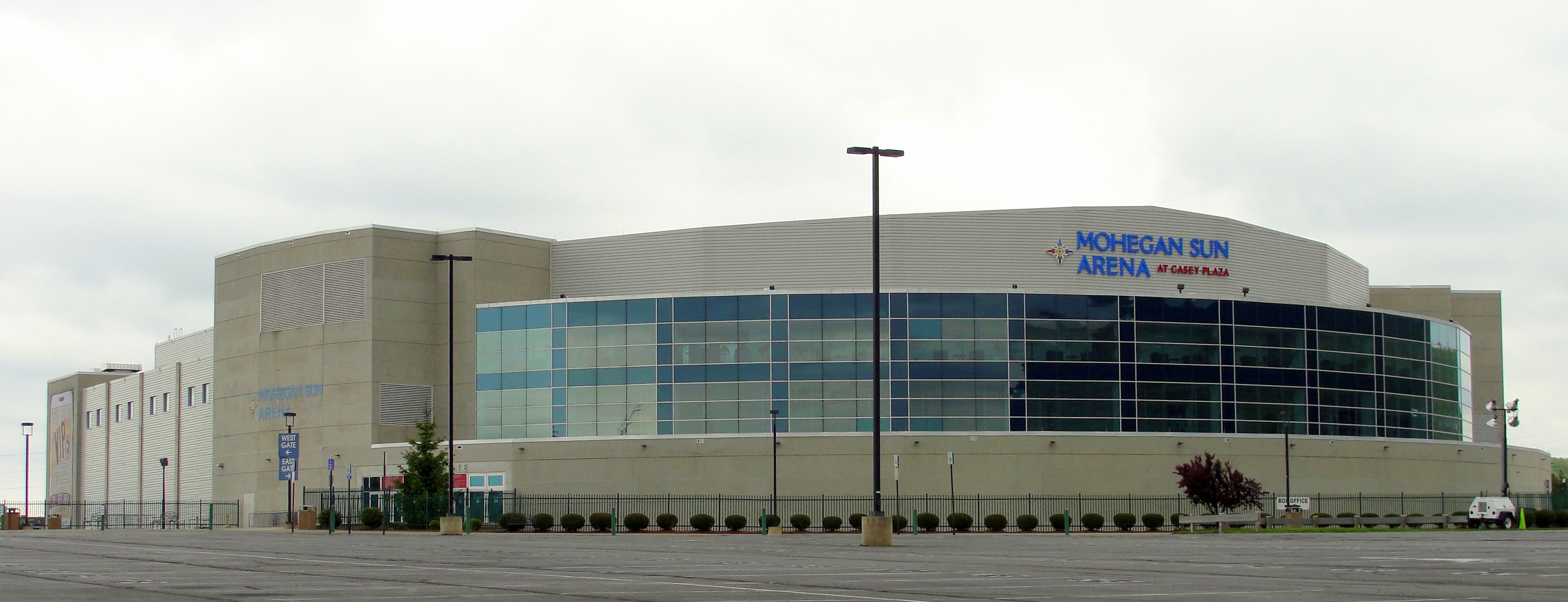
- The arena in 2012

- Location within Pennsylvania Location within the United States
- Former names: Northeastern Pennsylvania Civic Arena and Convention Center (1998–2000); First Union Arena (2000–2003); Wachovia Arena (2003–2010); Mohegan Sun Arena at Casey Plaza (2010–2024)
- Address: 255 Highland Park Boulevard
- Location: Wilkes-Barre Township, Pennsylvania, U.S.
- Coordinates: 41.240471°N 75.848504°W
- Owner: Luzerne County Convention Center Authority
- Operator: ASM Global
- Capacity: 8,300 (Hockey); 10,000 (Concerts)
- Surface: Multi-surface

Construction
- Groundbreaking: September 15, 1997
- Opened: November 13, 1999
- Cost: $44 million ($88.2 million in 2025 dollars)
- Architect: Heinlein Schrock
- Project manager: Hammes Company
- Structural engineers: Quad3 Group, Inc.
- Services engineers: Smith Seckman Reid, Inc.
- General contractor: Oscar J. Boldt Construction Company

Tenants
- Wilkes-Barre/Scranton Penguins (AHL) (1999–present); Wilkes-Barre/Scranton Pioneers (af2) (2002–2009)

Website
- mohegansunarenapa.com

Mohegan Arena at Casey Plaza (originally Northeastern Pennsylvania Civic Arena and Convention Center, formerly First Union Arena, Wachovia Arena and Mohegan Sun Arena at Casey Plaza) is an 8,050-seat multi-purpose arena located in Wilkes-Barre Township, Pennsylvania just northeast of Wilkes-Barre.

== History ==
Built in 1998 on land given by the Greater Wilkes-Barre Chamber, the arena was originally named the Northeastern Pennsylvania Civic Arena and Convention Center. In 2000, the naming rights were sold to First Union Bank, becoming First Union Arena, until the summer of 2003, when First Union Bank merged into Wachovia, at which point it became Wachovia Arena at Casey Plaza. On January 20, 2010, the arena became Mohegan Sun Arena at Casey Plaza as part of a 10-year naming rights contract with the Mohegan Pennsylvania racetrack and casino.

It has been home to the Wilkes-Barre/Scranton Penguins of the AHL since 1999, and the former home of the Wilkes-Barre/Scranton Pioneers of the AF2 League. In 2012, there were plans for it to be the home indoor arena for the Pennsylvania Shamrocks of the North American Lacrosse League, but the league subsequently folded. Furthermore, in 2024, There was an Arena Football One team planned called the Wilkes-Barre/Scranton Mavericks but the team folded in February 2025.

== Recognition and events ==
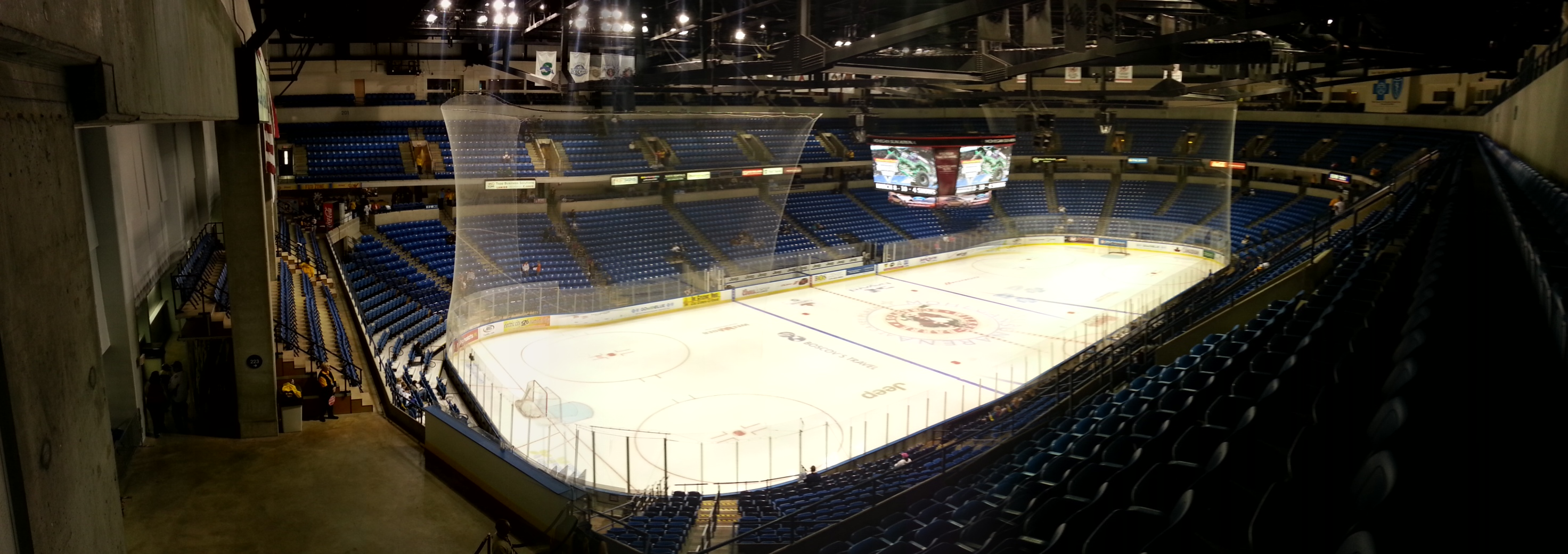
Panoramic view

The Mohegan Sun Arena at Casey Plaza has been recognized by many entertainment magazines as one of the best in the country for arenas under 10,000 in capacity, especially for its attendance and ease of show setup and teardown. The Penguins hold the American Hockey League record for most sellouts in a season, selling out all 40 home games in 2002–2003 and 2003–2004, and ran a streak of 90 consecutive sellouts between March 2002 and October 2004, and 54 from December 2000 to February 2002.

Other than Wilkes-Barre/Scranton Penguins hockey games, other events that occur at the arena include circus performances, an annual Christmas-time Trans-Siberian Orchestra performance, professional ice-skating shows, Harlem Globetrotters, Monster Jam, and the annual graduation ceremonies for nearby Crestwood High School, Penn Foster High School, King's College, University of Scranton, Luzerne County Community College, and Marywood University.

The arena has regularly hosted professional wrestling since 2000. The first event was WCW Monday Nitro on January 31, 2000. The first WWE live event was on July 16, 2000 and headlined by The Undertaker vs. Kurt Angle. The arena also hosted the 2007 WWE Draft on June 11, 2007 which was the final WWE Monday Night Raw appearance for Chris Benoit. This was also the site of the Mr. McMahon limo explosion angle. On November 15, 2016, the arena hosted the 900th episode of WWE Smackdown which saw the return of The Undertaker.

Some notable concerts include AC/DC, Bob Dylan, The Dead, Dropkick Murphys, Red Hot Chili Peppers, Foo Fighters, Elton John, Cher, and The Eagles.

Ringling Bros. and Barnum & Bailey Circus performed its last elephant show in its "Red" tour on May 1, 2016, a year before the circus itself closed.

On October 9, 2003, the New York Knicks and New Jersey Nets played a preseason game at the arena.

=== Political events ===
George W. Bush held a rally for re-election to the office of the president at the arena in 2004.

The arena has hosted multiple Donald Trump events, with the first being a rally on April 25, 2016, during his run in the 2016 election. He held another rally on October 10, 2016. Trump later returned as president on August 2, 2018, to assist in Lou Barletta's campaign for Senate. On September 3, 2022, the former President held a rally for the 2022 midterms. On August 17, 2024, Donald Trump held another rally there for the 2024 presidential election.

== Photo gallery ==
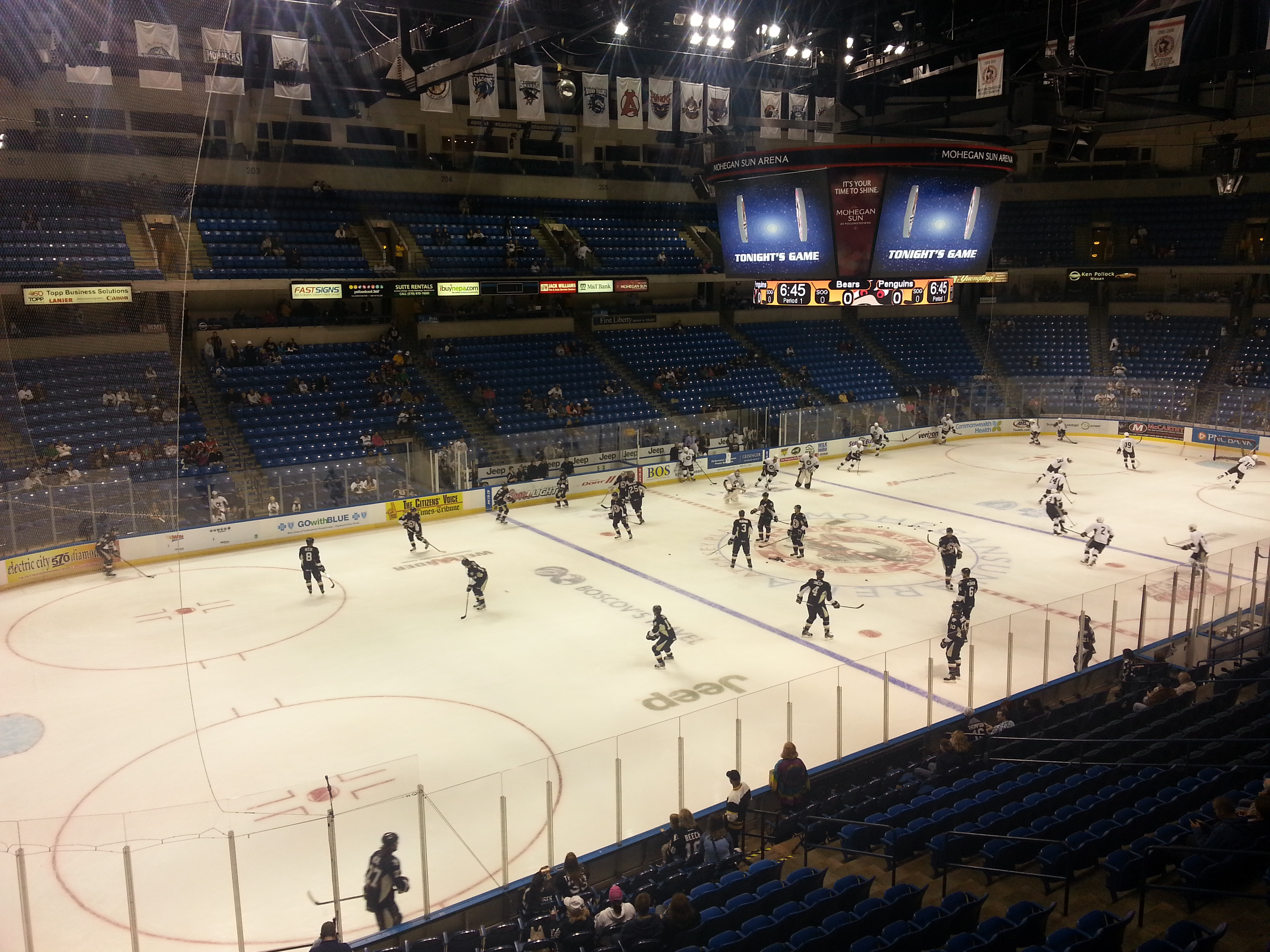
Side Angle View

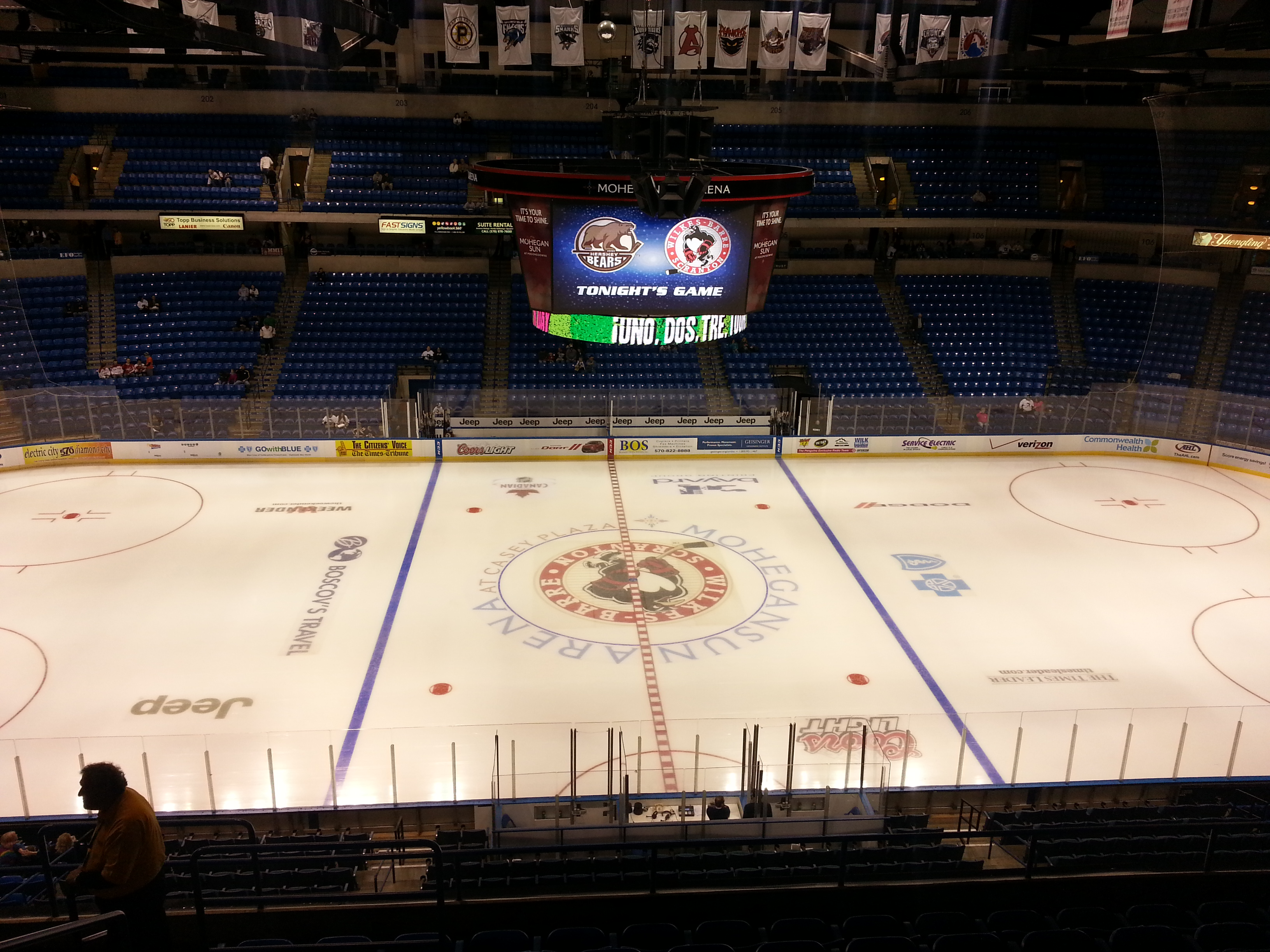
Center Ice View

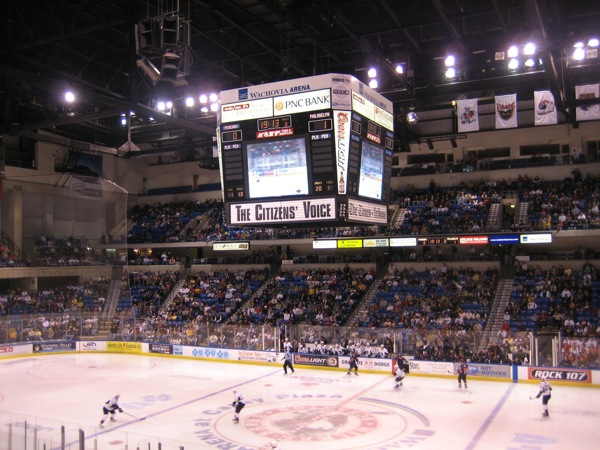
The Arena during a Wilkes-Barre/Scranton Penguins hockey game
