= San Antonio Talons =

Arena football team

Logo

General information
- Founded: 1999
- Folded: 2014
- Headquartered: the Alamodome in San Antonio, Texas
- Colors: Black, blue, white
- Mascot: Swoop

Personnel
- Owner: Arena Football League
- General manager: Keith Racine
- Head coach: Lee Johnson

Team history
- Tulsa Talons (2000–2011); San Antonio Talons (2012–2014)

Home fields
- Tulsa Convention Center (2000–2008); BOK Center (2009–2011); Alamodome (2012–2014)

League / conference affiliations
- AF2 (2000–2009): National Conference (2000–2009); Midwestern Division (2001); Central Division (2002–2009); Arena Football League (2010–2014): American Conference (2010); Midwest Division (2010); National Conference (2011–2014); Central Division (2011–2013); West Division (2014)

Championships
- League championships: 2: af2: 2003, 2007
- Conference championships: 2: National (af2): 2003, 2007
- Division championships: 10: Central (af2): 2002, 2003, 2004, 2005, 2006, 2007, 2008, 2009; Central (AFL): 2010, 2012

Playoff appearances (12)
- af2: 2000, 2001, 2002, 2003, 2004, 2005, 2006, 2007, 2008, 2009; AFL: 2010, 2012

The San Antonio Talons were a professional arena football team based in San Antonio, Texas. They played in the Arena Football League (AFL). Their home arena was the Alamodome, following their relocation to San Antonio for the 2012 season.

The team was founded in 2000 as the Tulsa Talons of Tulsa, Oklahoma, a charter member of the AFL's defunct developmental league, af2. The Talons played in the af2 for ten seasons, and joined the Arena Football League in 2010 following its reorganization. After the 2011 season the team announced they would relocate to San Antonio. The Talons have won ArenaCup championships in 2003 and 2007, won eight af2 division championships, one AFL division championship, and made a total of eleven playoff appearances.

== History ==
=== af2 days ===
The Talons began in 2000 in Tulsa, Oklahoma as the Tulsa Talons, a charter member of the now-defunct minor league of Arena football Arena Football 2, also known as af2. In 2009 the Talons moved from their original home field at Tulsa Convention Center to the new 18,041 seat arena called the BOK Center.

In terms of victories and championships, the Talons were a successful af2 franchise. The Talons had more wins than any other team in af2 history. The Talons were the first af2 franchise to reach 100 overall franchise victories. During the existence of the league, the Talons did not have a losing season and appeared in all ten af2 playoffs. Also, the Tulsa Talons won two af2 championships, known as the ArenaCup, in the last eight years of the league. The Talons are also the team with the longest streak of consecutive seasons in the AFL system.

Former head coach Mitch Allner is the only person in af2 history to win a championship as both player and head coach. In 2004 the Talons were sold to a group led by Henry Primeaux, the owners of automobile dealerships in Oklahoma, and Paul Ross, an investor. In 2009 three new owners were added to the group.

=== Transition to AFL ===
In 2010, some af2 teams joined with a handful of AFL teams which had remained in operation after the cancellation of the 2009 season formed a new league that was to be named AF1. The Talons moved from the af2 and joined the league, which became the highest level of indoor American football. However, the league soon decided to use the former Arena Football League name rather than AF1.

=== Move to San Antonio ===
On September 21, 2011, Talons chairman Paul Ross announced the team was moving to San Antonio due to less than desirable attendance and ticket sales. The team was purchased by a group led by California businessman Jason Lohe and the Talons were introduced to the city of San Antonio on September 27, 2011. The Talons then made a big play in free agency by signing veteran quarterback Aaron Garcia, who was fresh off of leading the Jacksonville Sharks to their first ever ArenaBowl victory. Despite AFL tradition to adopt previous AFL team names and identities for new teams in previous markets, the Talons chose to keep their nickname and not adopt the identity of the long-defunct San Antonio Force, due in part to the preexistence of the Georgia Force (a similar issue forced the Pittsburgh Power to adopt its current name instead of the Gladiators). In March 2012, Lynd Sports LLC, became a partial owner of the Talons. Just days later, Lohe was forced to return to California with family issues, and David Lynd became the principal owner of the franchise.

In December 2013, Lynd was sued for breach of contract when his real estate company (Lynd Company) failed to follow through on a $1.7 million purchase. On January 9, 2014, it was reported that the league had seized control of the franchise, and began immediately looking for new ownership. The league has been in talks with Spurs Sports & Entertainment, owners of the NBA's San Antonio Spurs, WNBA's San Antonio Stars and San Antonio Rampage hockey team, but neither AFL commissioner Jerry Kurz nor a Spurs spokeswoman could comment about the talks at the time.

On October 13, 2014, the AFL announced that the Talons would not be returning to play in 2015 and are dormant.

== Notable players ==
=== Individual awards ===
AFL Defensive Player of the Year
Season	Player	Position
2010	Gabe Nyenhuis	DL

Defensive Lineman of the Year
Season	Player	Position
2010	Gabe Nyenhuis	DL
2013	Joe Sykes	DL

=== All-Arena players ===
The following Talons players were named to All-Arena Teams:

- FB Odie Armstrong, Mykel Benson
- WR Donovan Morgan
- DL Gabe Nyenhuis, Victor DeGrate, Tim McGill, Joe Sykes
- LB Steve Watson, Jamar Ransom (2)
- DB J. C. Neal, Fred Shaw, Kelvin Rodgers

=== All-Ironman players ===
The following Talons players were named to All-Ironman Teams:

- WR/KR Jeff Hughley

== Head coaches ==
Name	Term	Regular season				Playoffs		Awards
Name	Term	W	L	T	Win%	W	L	Awards
Mitch Allner	2010–2011	18	14	0	.563	0	1	
Lee Johnson	2012–2014	25	27	0	.481	0	1	

== Season-by-season ==
League champions	Conference champions	Division champions	Playoff berth

Season	League	Conference	Division	Regular season			Postseason results
Season	League	Conference	Division	Finish	Wins	Losses	Postseason results
Tulsa Talons
2000	AF2	National	–	3rd	9	7	Lost First Round (Tennessee Valley) 28–49
2001	AF2	National	Midwestern	2nd	13	3	Lost First Round (Carolina) 35–69
2002	AF2	National	Central	1st	14	2	Won First Round (Arkansas) 34–32; Lost Conference Semifinals (Birmingham) 34–53
2003	AF2	National	Central	1st	13	3	Won Conference Semifinals (Hawaii) 58–38; Won Conference Championship (Arkansas) 63–52; Won ArenaCup IV (Macon) 58–40
2004	AF2	National	Southwestern	1st	13	3	Won Conference Semifinals (Louisville) 49–42; Lost Conference Championship (Peoria) 28–30
2005	AF2	National	Western	1st	11	5	Lost Conference Semifinals (Rio Grande Valley) 42–65
2006	AF2	National	Midwestern	1st	11	5	Lost Conference Semifinals (Arkansas) 51–53
2007	AF2	National	Central	1st	14	2	Won First Round (Oklahoma City) 65–27; Won Conference Semifinals (South Georgia) 49–28; Won Conference Championship (Bossier–Shreveport) 67–47; Won ArenaCup VIII (Wilkes-Barre/Scranton) 73–66
2008	AF2	National	Central	1st	12	4	Lost First Round (Amarillo) 62–65
2009	AF2	National	Central	1st	13	3	Won First Round (Oklahoma City) 90–75; Won Conference Semifinals (Bossier–Shreveport) 59–34; Lost Conference Championship (Spokane) 44–51
2010	AFL	American	Southwest	1st	10	6	Lost Conference Semifinals (Tampa Bay) 38–68
2011	AFL	National	Central	3rd	8	10	
San Antonio Talons
2012	AFL	National	Central	1st	14	4	Lost Conference Semifinals (Utah) 34–35
2013	AFL	National	Central	2nd	10	8	
2014	AFL	National	Central	2nd	3	15	
Total					168	80	(includes only regular season)
Total					11	10	(includes only the postseason)
Total					179	90	(includes both regular season and postseason)
