= Wilkes-Barre/Scranton Pioneers =

Arena football team

- Founded: 2001
- Folded: 2009
- Team history: Wilkes-Barre/Scranton Pioneers (2002–2009)
- Based in: Wachovia Arena at Casey Plaza in Wilkes-Barre, Pennsylvania
- Home arena: Wachovia Arena at Casey Plaza (2002–2009)
- League: AF2 (2002–2009): American Conference (2002–2009); Northeastern (2002–2004); Eastern Division (2005–2006); East Division (2007–2009)
- Colors: Blue, black, white

Personnel
- Head coach: Rich Ingold
- Owner: Cosmo DeNicola

Championships
- Conference titles (2): 2007, 2009
- Division titles (4): 2004, 2007, 2008, 2009

Playoff appearances (6)
- 2004, 2005, 2006, 2007, 2008, 2009

The Wilkes-Barre/Scranton Pioneers were a minor league arena football team that played in the AF2. The team was part of the East Division in the American conference. The Pioneers were an expansion team for the league's 2002 season, and were the runners-up in ArenaCup VIII and ArenaCup X.

== Franchise history ==
=== 2001 ===
The AF2 announced their expansion into the Wilkes-Barre/Scranton area on July 24, 2001. Ownership would comprise a Baltimore-based group, Smith Sports International, and NFL legend Johnny Unitas. The team signed a 10-year lease with the First Union Arena at Casey Plaza (later Wachovia Arena and now Mohegan Sun Arena) and would begin play with the 2002 season in the league's Northeast Division. Terry Karg was hired as the team's first head coach.

The team name was chosen on September 20 following a name-the-team contest. Of over 1500 entries, the name Pioneers was chosen in recognition of the early settlers of Northeastern Pennsylvania.

=== 2002 ===
The Pioneers got off to a shaky start in the AF2. The team took a 21-10 lead into halftime against the Greensboro Prowlers, but the Prowlers would come back to win the game 42-28, handing the Pioneers their first franchise loss and first loss at home. Wilkes-Barre/Scranton lost their next five games before finally taking a win against division rivals New Haven Ninjas in New Haven. With a 3-3 record following the win, the Pioneers were still in the playoff hunt and could secure a berth with a win against the Rochester Brigade or a loss by the Brigade to the Mohegan Wolves the following week. Both the Pioneers and Wolves lost, ending Wilkes-Barre/Scranton's hopes for a playoff spot. Their season came to a close with a 6-10 record.

Following the season, head coach Karg resigned and left the Pioneers. Larry Kuharich, who had played for the AFL's Tampa Bay Storm and was running back coach for the New Orleans Saints, was hired as the team's second head coach.

=== 2003 ===
The Pioneers’ second season got off to the same start that their first one did with an opening game loss to the Greensboro Prowlers. Soon afterwards, Coach Kuharich resigned as head coach to be replaced by Dean Cokinos. The Pioneers would finish the season with a 6-10 record, the same as in 2002, and without a spot in the playoffs.

Attendance for home games fell in 2003. After averaging nearly 6200 fans per game in 2002, attendance dropped more than 1000 to average 4975 per game in 2003. The ownership blamed itself, rather than the product on the field, for moving games to Friday nights from Saturday nights; they vowed to return to Saturdays as often as possible in 2004.

Following a tumultuous season that included the resignation of both the head coach and general manager, the Pioneers hired Les Moss, who had been working with the Orlando Predators of the AFL, as the team's fourth head coach.

=== 2004 ===
Wilkes-Barre/Scranton's third season began on a noticeably different note than the previous two seasons. In a first-time matchup against the Columbus Wardogs, the Pioneers won their home and season opener. The team would continue to win, going 5-0 until suffering their first loss to the Albany Conquest. The Pioneers went on to lose only two more games, ending with a 13-3 record. They had not only secured a playoff spot, but they had won the Northeast Division and earned a first-round bye. Their first playoff game, against divisional rival Cape Fear Wildcats, resulted in a win, propelling them to the Conference Championships. The Pioneers would lose the championship game to the Florida Firecats, ending their first postseason run.

Following their first playoff season, Coach Moss was named the AF2 Coach of the Year. He also signed on to coach the Pioneers in 2005, becoming the first Pioneers coach to remain for a second season.

=== 2005 ===
The Pioneers returned to action in 2005 with nine players returning from the 2004 roster, including 2004 AF2 Rookie of the Year J. R. Thomas. With nine scores on ten possessions, the Pioneers won their season and home opener over the Oklahoma City Yard Dawgs. Wilkes-Barre/Scranton won two more games before 2004 starting quarterback Tim Hicks was traded to the Bossier-Shreveport Battle Wings. The Pioneers then suffered three straight losses and the loss of star receiver Thomas to a broken leg. The Pioneers would endure a further hardship with the hospitalization of coach Moss due to a "weight-related issue". Despite the problems, the Pioneers would finish fourth in the Eastern Division with a 9-7 record and clinched a wildcard playoff berth.

With a win over the Green Bay Blizzard, the Pioneers advanced to the Conference Semifinals to face Florida, the top-seeded team in the conference. Their championship aspirations would die in the second round in a 59-45 loss.

Following the season, Coach Moss signed a three-year contract with the Orlando Predators as an assistant coach, leaving the Pioneers to find their fifth coach in as many seasons. Pittsburgh native Rich Ingold, former Quad City Steamwheelers coach and Dallas Desperados coordinator, was hired in this capacity for the 2006 season.

=== 2006 ===
Ingold's first game with the Pioneers began with new quarterback Mike Granieri throwing two interceptions against the Louisville Fire; it ended with a score of 45-37 and a win. The Pioneers would continue their season-opening winning streak to 5-0 before losing to the Tulsa Talons. After two wins in the next four games, Ingold released receiver Thomas for "insubordination". A four-game losing streak would befall the team, but a victory over Albany in the season closer would propel them into the playoffs with a 9-7 record. Their season would end one week later, losing the first playoff round to Manchester.

In the offseason, the Pioneers signed former Penn State quarterback Zack Mills to lead the offense. However, Mills only spent four days training with the Pioneers before departing from the team, citing a waning passion for the game.

=== 2007 ===
For the fourth straight season, the Pioneers opened with a win, this time against Manchester. In their second game, against the Cincinnati Jungle Kats expansion team, Wilkes-Barre/Scranton's 94-25 win set a team record for most points scored in a game; the 69 points of separation was also the fourth-highest margin of victory in league history. The Pioneers would extend their winning streak to 13 games before losing to Albany in week 16. They finished the regular season with a 14-2 record and home field advantage throughout the playoffs.

The Pioneers defeated the Tri-Cities Fever in the first round of the playoffs. In the second round, they emerged victorious over the Central Valley Coyotes to advance to their second-ever American Conference Championship, where they overcame defending conference champions Green Bay to advance to ArenaCup VIII. Playing against the Tulsa Talons, the only team in the league with a better record, the Pioneers lost the championship 73-66 on a dropped touchdown pass to end the game.

=== 2008 ===
In 2008, the Pioneers began to reload to take another shot at the ArenaCup. The team re-signed several key players from the 2007 squad, including quarterback Ryan Vena. The season got off to a rocky start, however, when the team lost the season opener to the Quad City Steamwheelers. After winning handily over the Daytona Beach ThunderBirds, the Pioneers began their season at Wachovia Arena with a win over the Mahoning Valley Thunder. The Pioneers lost only one game in their division in 2008 and won all of their home matches, giving them seventeen straight regular season home victories dating back to the 2006 season. The Pioneers began their playoff run with a victory over the Steamwheelers but lost in the conference semifinals to eventual ArenaCup champion Tennessee Valley.

=== 2009 ===
The 2009 campaign began in the same way the 2008 season did: rebuilding a strong team with the ArenaCup in sight. Several key players returned to the team in 2009, including Ryan Vena, David Davis, and Micheaux Robinson. The Pioneers began the season with two home wins over division opponents but dropped the Week 3 contest to the Kentucky Horsemen. The Pioneers lost only two other games in 2009, one to Tulsa and one to Spokane. Wilkes-Barre/Scranton also kept up the tradition of winning at home, racking up another perfect season at Wachovia Arena and extending their regular season home win streak to 25. The Pioneers locked up the Eastern Division crown for the third straight year and held homefield advantage throughout the playoffs.

All of the Pioneers playoff games would be rematches from the 2009 regular season. The team took easy wins over Albany and Kentucky and won a nail-biter against Green Bay to advance to the ArenaCup. The Pioneers took a tie game into halftime against the Spokane Shock in the ArenaCup, but the game ended in disappointment again; the Pioneers were denied the ArenaCup.

=== Sale ===
Shortly after the Pioneers lost ArenaCup X, owner Cosmo DeNicola announced that he had put the team up for sale. DeNicola, a resident of the Philadelphia area, cited his other business responsibilities and length of time away from home during the AF2 season as the reasons for putting the team on the market. He had hoped that an owner could be found in northeast Pennsylvania to keep the team in Wilkes-Barre and that an owner could be found in time to field a team for the 2010 season. No one was found to step in as owner, and the team announced that it was in the process of shutting down the team offices and would not field a team in 2010, though any potential investors were still encouraged to step up and begin negotiations to purchase the franchise. (As it would turn out, the entire league would disband in 2010, with several of its teams "moving up" into a reorganized, one-tier Arena Football League that year.)

== In popular culture ==
In multiple episodes of the American television comedy, The Office, Michael Scott and other characters are seen wearing Wilkes-Barre/Scranton Pioneers sweatshirts and undershirts. The Office takes place in Scranton, Pennsylvania. Also in some episodes, the gold AFL football with the blue stripe is seen on some of the employees' desks.

== Return to Wilkes-Barre ==
In 2024, arena football was set to Wilkes-Barre with the founding of the Wilkes-Barre/Scranton Mavericks, an Arena Football One expansion team. On February 14, 2025, it was announced that the Mavericks would no longer be included as a member of Arena Football One, prior to the organization's first game.

== Season-by-season ==
Season records
Season	W	L	T	Finish	Playoff results
2002	6	10	0	3rd AC Northeast	--
2003	6	10	0	3rd AC Northeast	--
2004	13	3	0	1st AC Northeast	Won Round 1 (Cape Fear 40-37); Lost Week 2 (Florida 41-31)
2005	9	7	0	4th AC East	Won Round 1 (Green Bay 48-41); Lost AC Semifinal (Florida 59-45)
2006	9	7	0	3rd AC East	Lost AC Round 1 (Manchester 55-47)
2007	14	2	0	1st AC East	Won AC Round 1 (Tri-Cities 57-54); Won AC Semifinals (Central Valley 70-53); Won AC Championship (Green Bay 46-43); Lost ArenaCup VIII (Tulsa 73-66)
2008	14	2	0	1st AC East	Won AC Round 1 (Quad City 57-29); Lost AC Semifinals (Tennessee Valley 34-30)
2009	13	3	0	1st AC East	Won AC Round 1 (Albany 78-21); Won AC Semifinals (Kentucky 82-49); Won AC Championship (Green Bay 72-67); Lost ArenaCup X (Spokane 74-27)
Totals	93	50	0	(including playoffs)	

=== Past head coaches ===
- Terry Karg (2002)
- Lary Kuharich (2003)
- Dean Cokinos (2003)
- Les Moss (2004–2005)
- Rich Ingold (2006–2009)
