= Albany Firebirds (af2) =

Arena football team

Logo

General information
- Founded: 2002
- Folded: 2009
- Headquartered: Times Union Center in Albany, New York
- Colors: Black, royal blue, red, burnt orange, gold, white
- Mascot: Flames

Personnel
- Owners: Capital District Sports, Inc.
- Head coach: Ron Selesky 2001,Pete Constanza 2002-03

Team history
- Albany Conquest (2002–2008); Albany Firebirds (2009)

Home fields
- Times Union Center (2002–2009)

League / conference affiliations
- AF2 (2002–2009): American Conference (2002–2009); Northeast Division (2002–2004); Eastern Division (2005–2006); East Division (2007–2009)

Championships
- Division championships: 2: 2002, 2003

Playoff appearances (3)
- 2002, 2003, 2009

The Albany Firebirds were a professional arena football team of the AF2 based in Albany, New York. Albany was granted an expansion team in 2002 and began play as the Albany Conquest. The Firebirds played their home games at the Times Union Center. They are the second arena football team for Albany, as the city was granted an expansion team, the Albany Firebirds, in the Arena Football League in 1990. The team moved to Indianapolis, Indiana in 2000 and played as the Indiana Firebirds through 2004 before disbanding.

Albany Conquest (2002-2008)

Then the city of Albany ventured into the world of arena football again, this time joining the AF2 in 2002, creating a new franchise by the name the Albany Conquest. The team enjoyed little success and in 2009 for marketing purposes changed their name back to the Albany Firebirds before disbanding in 2010. They cited low attendance and poor fan support. Due to financial difficulties and low support, the Conquest were expected to fold following the 2008 season when a new investor could not be found. The franchise had notified the league in late September that it would not return, but following a meeting with the Albany Times Union and the operator of the Times Union Center, an agreement was reached that would allow the team to return for 2009. The team also acquired the rights to the old Firebirds name and logo in a rebranding effort to raise interest in the team, hoping to bring back fans from the days of the original Firebirds team.

On April 28, 2009, it was announced that the Albany Firebirds had offered former NFL quarterback Michael Vick a contract. Under the terms of this contract, Vick would be required to donate $100,000 to a local animal shelter. The following day, the team retracted the announcement, claiming that it had been a publicity stunt created by the team's marketing department. The team's owner, Walter Robb, who knew nothing of the stunt, was cited as saying, "I'm a dog lover and I don't want anything to do with (Vick)."

== Original team name ==
In a September 2016 article in Sports Illustrated, it was discovered that the Conquest/Firebirds almost became known as the Albany WarBirds. In 2001, 20-year-old college students Jason Klein and Casey White of branding firm Brandiose were chosen to come up with a new catchy name for a new franchise for Albany. The name that was chosen was the "WarBirds" and logos, helmet and uniform designs were created. They filed for a trademark on August 15 and set September 12 as the day to unveil the name, logo and uniforms. Then, the September 11th attacks occurred in New York City, The Pentagon and in Shanksville, Pennsylvania. It was then determined that all parties involved agreed that the concept, which Klein described as a "weaponized airplane", would have to go. The "Empire" was the frontrunner for the new team name but they ran into a trademark issue, so they eventually settled on "Conquest". However, in 2018, the new AFL franchise became known as the Albany Empire with no trademark issues.

The team name was revived in 2023 for a new member of the Arena Football League.

== Notable players ==
See Category:Albany Firebirds (af2) players

== Season-by-season ==
Season records
| Season | W | L | T | Finish | Playoff results |
|---|---|---|---|---|---|
Albany Conquest
| 2002 | 13 | 3 | 0 | 1st AC Northeast | Won AC Round 1 (Rochester 31–26); Lost AC Semifinal (Cape Fear 46–30) |
| 2003 | 13 | 3 | 0 | 1st AC Northeast | Lost AC Semifinal (Macon 59–47) |
| 2004 | 6 | 10 | 0 | 3rd AC Northeast | – |
| 2005 | 4 | 12 | 0 | 5th AC East | – |
| 2006 | 5 | 11 | 0 | 6th AC East | – |
| 2007 | 6 | 10 | 0 | 4th AC East | – |
| 2008 | 5 | 11 | 0 | 3rd AC East | – |
Albany Firebirds
| 2009 | 7 | 9 | 0 | 2nd AC East | Lost AC 1st Round (Wilkes-Barre/Scranton 78–21) |
| Totals | 60 | 72 | 0 | (including playoffs) | |
