= 2006 Wilkes-Barre/Scranton Pioneers season =

The 2006 Wilkes-Barre/Scranton Pioneers season was the team's fifth season as a member of the af2. Following the resignation of head coach Les Moss after the 2005 season, the team hired area native Rich Ingold as the team's fifth coach in as many years. Ingold took the Pioneers to the playoffs for the third straight year; they lost in the first round to division rival Manchester Wolves.

== Schedule ==
=== Regular season ===
Week	Date	Opponent	Result	Record	Game site
1	March 31, 2006	Louisville Fire	W 45–37	1–0	Wachovia Arena
2	Bye				
3	April 14, 2006	Albany Conquest	W 55–48 (OT)	2–0	Times Union Center
4	April 21, 2006	South Georgia Wildcats	W 36–33	3–0	Wachovia Arena
5	April 29, 2006	Manchester Wolves	W 62–47	4–0	Verizon Wireless Arena
6	May 5, 2006	Green Bay Blizzard	W 42–27	5–0	Wachovia Arena
7	May 13, 2006	Tulsa Talons	L 53–37	5–1	Wachovia Arena
8	May 20, 2006	Macon Knights	W 38–22	6–1	Macon Coliseum
9	May 27, 2006	Manchester Wolves	L 48–28	6–2	Wachovia Arena
10	June 3, 2006	Louisville Fire	W 51–48	7–2	Freedom Hall
11	June 10, 2006	Albany Conquest	L 73–70	7–3	Times Union Center
12	June 17, 2006	Quad City Steamwheelers	W 55–52	8–3	Wachovia Arena
13	June 24, 2006	Green Bay Blizzard	L 65–35	8–4	Resch Center
14	Bye				
15	July 8, 2006	Florida Firecats	L 56–51	8–5	Wachovia Arena
16	July 14, 2006	Manchester Wolves	L 45–14	8–6	Verizon Wireless Arena
17	July 22, 2006	Quad City Steamwheelers	L 55–34	8–7	iWireless Center
18	July 29, 2006	Albany Conquest	W 54–27	9–7	Wachovia Arena

=== Postseason ===
Week	Date	Opponent	Result	Record	Game site
1	August 4, 2006	Manchester Wolves	L 47–55	0–1	Verizon Wireless Arena

== Final standings ==
American Conference East Division
Team	Overall			Division		
Team	Wins	Losses	Percentage	Wins	Losses	Percentage
Green Bay Blizzard	10	6	0.625	6	4	0.600
Louisville Fire	9	7	0.562	5	5	0.500
Manchester Wolves	9	7	0.562	7	5	0.583
Wilkes-Barre/Scranton Pioneers	9	7	0.562	7	5	0.583
Quad City Steamwheelers	7	9	0.437	4	6	0.400
Albany Conquest	5	11	0.312	4	8	0.333

== Attendance ==
Week	Opponent	Attendance
1	Louisville Fire	5,091
4	South Georgia Wildcats	4,285
6	Green Bay Blizzard	4,227
7	Tulsa Talons	5,026
9	Manchester Wolves	4,577
12	Quad City Steamwheelers	5,300
15	Florida Firecats	5,536
18	Macon Knights	7,757
Total		41,799
Average		4,644
