= Brian Jones (quarterback) =

American football player (born 1980)

No. 12
- Position: Quarterback

Personal information
- Born: July 2, 1980 (age 46); Chico, California, U.S.
- Listed height: 6 ft 2 in (1.88 m)
- Listed weight: 205 lb (93 kg)

Career information
- High school: Pleasant Valley (Chico)
- College: Toledo
- NFL draft: 2003: undrafted

Career history
- Memphis Xplorers (2004–2005); Las Vegas Gladiators (2006)*; Memphis Xplorers (2006); Las Vegas Gladiators (2007); Columbus Destroyers (2008)*; New Orleans VooDoo (2008)*; Arizona Rattlers (2008); Manchester Wolves (2008–2009); Arkansas Diamonds (2010); Kansas City Command (2012)
- * Offseason or practice squad member only

Awards and highlights
- ArenaCup champion (VI)

Career AFL statistics
- Comp. / Att.: 185 / 289
- Passing yards: 2,363
- TD–INT: 35–11
- Passer rating: 103.91
- Rushing TDs: 10
- Stats at ArenaFan.com

Brian Jones (born July 2, 1980) is an American former football quarterback who played three seasons in the Arena Football League (AFL) with the Las Vegas Gladiators, Arizona Rattlers and Kansas City Command. He played college football at the University of Toledo, after a record setting career at Shasta College. He also played in the af2 for the Memphis Xplorers and Manchester Wolves, winning ArenaCup VI with the Xplorers.

== College career ==
=== College career statistics ===
Shasta Knights
Season	Passing					Rushing		
Season	Comp	Att	Yards	TD	Int	Att	Yards	TD
1999	154	321	2403	24	14	48	-23	2
2000	195	340	2972	28	10	52	34	3
CCCAA career	349	661	5375	52	24	100	11	5
Toledo Rockets
Season	Passing					Rushing		
Season	Comp	Att	Yards	TD	Int	Att	Yards	TD
2001	17	33	193	3	3	7	-15	0
2002	297	423	3446	23	9	85	414	5
NCAA career	314	456	3639	26	12	92	399	5

== Professional career ==
Jones played for the Memphis Xplorers of the af2 from 2004 to 2006. In nine games with the Xplorers in 2004, Jones passed for 1,578 yards, completing 134 of 226 attempts and rushing 99 yards on 44 attempts. He threw 22 touchdown passes and rushed for 12 more. In 2005, he set the franchise's single-season marks with 69 passing touchdowns and 23 rushing touchdowns. He also recorded a league-leading passer rating of 123.11, completed 245 of his 388 attempts for 3,384 yards, 69 touchdowns and 7 interceptions. On the ground, Jones was the team's leading rusher with 229 yards. The Xplorers won ArenaCup VI against the Louisville Fire.

Jones signed with the Las Vegas Gladiators on October 10, 2005. He was released by the Gladiators on January 20, 2006.

Jones played for the Memphis Xplorers in 2006, recording 3,937 yards passing and 81 touchdown passes for new single-season records.

Jones signed with the Las Vegas Gladiators on December 13, 2006. He recorded 25 passing touchdowns on 1,834 yards in 2007 for the Gladiators.

Jones was awarded to the Columbus Destroyers on October 29, 2007. He was released by the Destroyers on February 24, 2008.

Jones was signed to the New Orleans VooDoo's practice squad on March 7, 2008. He was released by the VooDoo on March 10, 2008.

Jones signed with the on Arizona Rattlers March 13, 2008. He was released by the Rattlers on April 4, 2008.

Jones came out of retirement in 2008 to play for the Manchester Wolves during the af2 playoffs. He again came out of retirement to play for the Wolves during the 2009 af2 playoffs.

Jones played for the Kansas City Command in 2012, recording ten touchdowns on 529 passing yards.
