= Danton Barto =

American football player and coach (1971–2021)

- Barto at Memphis State

No. 59
- Position: Linebacker

Personal information
- Born: March 31, 1971; Muncy, Pennsylvania, U.S.
- Died: August 22, 2021 (aged 50)
- Listed height: 6 ft 0 in (1.83 m)
- Listed weight: 245 lb (111 kg)

Career information
- High school: Niceville (Niceville, Florida)
- College: Memphis State (1989–1993)
- NFL draft: 1994: undrafted

Career history

Playing
- Shreveport Pirates (1994); Memphis Mad Dogs (1995); Connecticut Coyotes (1996)

Coaching
- Memphis Xplorers (2001) Defensive coordinator; Memphis Xplorers (2002–2006) Head coach; Las Vegas Gladiators (2007) Head coach; Manchester Wolves (2008–2009) Head coach; Arkansas Diamonds (2010) Head coach; Kansas City Command (2011–2012) Head coach; Lehigh Valley Steelhawks (2018) Head coach

Awards and highlights
- ArenaCup champion (2005); af2 Coach of the Year (2005); 2× First-team All-IFA (1992–1993); IFA Defensive Player of the Year (1992); Memphis Tigers No. 59 retired
- Stats at ArenaFan.com

Danton L. Barto (March 31, 1971 – August 22, 2021) was an American professional football linebacker and coach. He played college football for the Memphis State Tigers, and professionally for the Memphis Mad Dogs of the Canadian Football League (CFL) and the Connecticut Coyotes of the Arena Football League (AFL). He was also the head coach of the Las Vegas Gladiators and Kansas City Command of the AFL.

== Early life ==
Barto was born in Muncy, Pennsylvania. He later moved to Niceville, Florida, and attended Niceville High School. In 2023, his No. 55 jersey was retired by Niceville High. It was the first number ever retired by the school.

== College career ==
Barto played college football at Memphis State University (now University of Memphis) from 1990 to 1993. He was redshirted by the Tigers in 1989.

He recorded four interceptions in 1992, earning first-team All-Independent Football Alliance (IFA) and IFA Defensive Player of the Year honors. Barto totaled 144 tackles in 1993, garnering first-team All-IFA recognition for the second consecutive season.

He was inducted into the University of Memphis M-Club Hall of Fame in 2007. As of 2022, he is still the team's all-time leader in both solo tackles with 273 and total tackles with 473. A Change.org petition was started to request that Barto's jersey number be retired by Memphis. After undergoing a formal process, Barto's No. 59 jersey was retired by the school in November 2022. As of September 23, 2022, the petition had garnered 2,319 signatures.

== Professional career ==
After going undrafted in the 1994 NFL draft, Barto signed with the Shreveport Pirates of the Canadian Football League (CFL) but did not play in any games for the team during the 1994 season.

He dressed in 18 games for the CFL's Memphis Mad Dogs in 1995, totaling 27 defensive tackles, 10 special teams tackles, one sack, one pass breakup, and two fumble recoveries, one of which was returned for a touchdown.

He was selected by the Hamilton Tiger-Cats of the CFL in the 1996 dispersal draft in early March 1996. He was later released by the team in early June without appearing in any games.

He signed with the Connecticut Coyotes of the Arena Football League (AFL) in late March 1996. Barto played in two games for the Coyotes during the 1996 season as a fullback/linebacker, recording one solo tackle and one assisted tackle.

== Coaching career ==
Barto was the defensive coordinator of the Memphis Xplorers of the af2 during their inaugural season in 2001. He then served as the team's head coach from 2002 to 2006. In 2005, he was named the af2 Coach of the Year and won ArenaCup VI. The Xplorers folded after the 2006 season.

Barto was the head coach of the Las Vegas Gladiators of the AFL in 2007. After starting the season with 2–10 record, it was reported that he would be let go after the season. Barto and the Gladiators went on to finish the year with a 2–14 record.

He was the head coach of the af2's Manchester Wolves from 2008 to 2009. The Wolves went 9–7 in the 2008 regular season, and lost in the American Conference championship game to the Tennessee Valley Vipers.

He was the head coach of the Arkansas Diamonds of the Indoor Football League (IFL) in 2010, leading the team to an 11–3 regular season record and a loss in the conference championship game to the Billings Outlaws.

Barto was the head coach of the Kansas City Command of the AFL from 2011 to 2012, compiling an overall record of 9–27.

He was the head coach of the Lehigh Valley Steelhawks of the National Arena League (NAL) in 2018. The team went 0–15 and folded after the season.

=== Head coaching record ===
Team	Year	Regular season				Postseason			
Team	Year	Won	Lost	Win %	Finish	Won	Lost	Win %	Result
Memphis	2002	5	11	.313	4th in NC Central	-	-	-	
Memphis	2003	6	10	.375	3rd in NC Central	-	-	-	
Memphis	2004	10	6	.625	2nd in AC Mid-South	0	1	0.000	Lost to Florida Firecats in first round
Memphis	2005	13	3	.813	1st in NC Midwest	3	0	1.000	Won ArenaCup VI
Memphis	2006	11	5	.688	2nd in AC Southern	1	1	0.500	Lost to Green Bay Blizzard in second round
Memphis total		45	35	.570		4	2	.667	
Las Vegas	2007	2	14	.125	5th in AC Western	-	-	-	
Manchester	2008	9	7	.563	2nd in AC East	2	1	.667	Lost to Tennessee Valley Vipers in AC Championship
Manchester	2009	7	9	.438	2nd in AC East	0	1	.000	Lost to Iowa Barnstormers in first round
Manchester total		16	16	.500		2	2	.500	
Arkansas	2010	11	3	.786	1st in Lonestar East	2	1	.667	Lost to Billings Outlaws in Conference Championship
Kansas City	2011	6	12	.333	4th in NC Central	-	-	-	
Kansas City	2012	3	15	.167	4th in NC Central	-	-	-	
Kansas City total		9	27	.250		-	-	-	
Lehigh Valley	2018	0	15	.000	6th in NAL	-	-	-	
Total		83	110	.430		8	5	.615	

== Scouting career ==
Barto was a scout for the St. Louis/Los Angeles Rams from 2013 to 2017. In 2022, the first-ever BART Awards, named after Barto, were given to the NFL's top scouts.

== Personal life ==
Barto's son Will was also a member of the Memphis Tigers football team.

On August 22, 2021, Danton died from complications of COVID-19. He was 50.

== See also ==
- List of NCAA football retired numbers
- Memphis Tigers football statistical leaders
