= 2004 Wilkes-Barre/Scranton Pioneers season =

The 2004 Wilkes-Barre/Scranton Pioneers season was the team's third season as a member of the AF2. The Pioneers finished with a 13–3 record under new head coach Les Moss, their fourth head coach in three seasons. The Pioneers clinched the Northeastern Division and secured their best first playoff appearance. The Pioneers lost in the third week of the postseason, ending their playoff run just short of the ArenaCup. Following the season, Moss signed a contract to remain the head coach for a second season, the first returning coach in team history.

== Schedule ==
=== Regular season ===
Week	Date	Opponent	Result	Record	Game site
1	Bye				
2	April 10, 2004	Columbus Wardogs	W 38–33	1–0	Wachovia Arena
3	April 16, 2004	Green Bay Blizzard	W 75–39	2–0	Resch Center
4	April 24, 2004	Quad City Steamwheelers	W 40–27	3–0	Wachovia Arena
5	May 1, 2004	Louisville Fire	W 59–51	4–0	Wachovia Arena
6	May 8, 2004	Albany Conquest	L 52–54	4–1	Times Union Center
7	May 15, 2004	Peoria Pirates	W 33–30	5–1	Carver Arena
8	May 22, 2004	Cape Fear Wildcats	W 48–41	6–1	Wachovia Arena
9	May 29, 2004	Louisville Fire	L 48–47	6–2	Freedom Hall
10	June 5, 2004	Manchester Wolves	W 57–41	7–2	Wachovia Arena
11	June 12, 2004	Quad City Steamwheelers	W 46–39	8–2	iWireless Center
12	June 18, 2004	Albany Conquest	W 69–43	9–2	Times Union Center
13	June 26, 2004	Cape Fear Wildcats	L 57–49	9–3	Wachovia Arena
14	Bye				
15	July 10, 2004	Manchester Wolves	W 61–42	10–3	Wachovia Arena
16	July 17, 2004	Albany Conquest	W 55–31	11–3	Wachovia Arena
17	July 24, 2004	Cape Fear Wildcats	W 53–46	12–3	Crown Coliseum
18	July 30, 2004	Manchester Wolves	W 44–37	13–3	Verizon Wireless Arena

=== Postseason ===
Week	Date	Opponent	Result	Record	Game site
1	Bye				
2	August 14	South Georgia Wildcats	W 40–37	1–0	Wachovia Arena
3	August 22	Florida Firecats	L 75–39	1–1	Wachovia Arena

== Final standings ==
American Conference Northeast Division
Team	Overall			Division		
Team	Wins	Losses	Percentage	Wins	Losses	Percentage
Wilkes-Barre/Scranton Pioneers	13	3	.812	7	2	.778
South Georgia Wildcats	12	4	.750	6	3	.667
Albany Conquest	6	10	.375	2	7	.222
Manchester Wolves	5	11	.312	3	6	.167

== Attendance ==
Week	Opponent	Attendance
2	Columbus Wardogs	4,723
4	Quad City Steamwheelers	4,953
5	Louisville Fire	5,545
8	South Georgia Wildcats	5,763
10	Manchester Wolves	5,538
13	South Georgia Wildcats	5,235
15	Manchester Wolves	4,764
16	Albany Conquest	5,398
Playoff	Opponent	Attendance
2	Cape Fear Wildcats	5,113
3	Florida Firecats	5.312
Total		52,344
Average		5,234
