= Steve Gonzalez =

American football player (born 1981)

No. 9
- Positions: Wide receiver, defensive back

Personal information
- Born: May 1, 1981 (age 45); Jersey City, New Jersey, U.S.
- Listed height: 6 ft 0 in (1.83 m)
- Listed weight: 180 lb (82 kg)

Career information
- High school: Ceres (CA)
- College: Menlo

Career history
- San Diego Riptide (2005); Manchester Wolves (2005–2006); Philadelphia Soul (2007); Green Bay Blizzard (2008); Dallas Vigilantes (2010)

Career AFL statistics
- Receptions: 15
- Receiving yards: 128
- Receiving touchdowns: 3
- Stats at ArenaFan.com

Steve "Speedy" Gonzalez (born May 1, 1981) is an American former professional football wide receiver who played one season with the Philadelphia Soul of the Arena Football League (AFL). He first enrolled at Modesto Junior College before transferring to Menlo College. Gonzalez was also a member of the San Diego Riptide, Manchester Wolves, Green Bay Blizzard and Dallas Vigilantes. He appeared on Michael Irvin's reality show 4th and Long.

== Early life ==
Gonzalez played football, baseball and basketball at Ceres High School in Ceres, California.

== College career ==
Gonzalez first played college football for the Modesto Junior College Pirates, starting at cornerback and wide receiver for two years.

He then transferred and played for the Menlo Oaks of Menlo College for one year before dropping out of college after his junior year. Unable to pay the tuition, he instead took jobs such as working for a moving company and a coffee shop.

== Professional career ==
=== San Diego Riptide ===
Gonzalez played for the San Diego Riptide of the af2 in 2005. He played in 13 games for the Riptide during the 2005 season, leading the af2 in kick return yards with 1,666 and kick return touchdowns with six. He was also fourth in the league in all-purpose yards with 2,792 and tenth in scoring with 206 points. Gonzalez earned Second Team honors on the National Conference All-af2 team.

=== Manchester Wolves ===
Gonzalez was signed by the Manchester Wolves of the af2 in November 2005 and played for the team during the 2006 season. He played offense in fifteen games for the Wolves, recording 1,355 receiving yards and 45 touchdowns on 118 receptions. He saw action on defense in two games, accumulating seven pass breakups and one interception. Gonzalez was also fourth in the af2 with 2,525 all-purpose yards and second in scoring with 276 points. He suffered an ankle injury that caused him to miss the last two games of the regular season and all of the playoffs. He was named the sixth best kick returner in af2 history in 2009.

=== Philadelphia Soul ===
Gonzalez signed with the Philadelphia Soul in October 2006 and played for the team during the 2007 season. He was released by the Soul on August 1, 2007.

=== Green Bay Blizzard ===
Gonzalez played for the Green Bay Blizzard of the af2 in 2008.

=== 4th and Long ===
Gonzalez was the fifth cut on Michael Irvin's reality show 4th and Long.

=== Dallas Vigilantes ===
Gonzalez was signed by the Dallas Vigilantes on January 13, 2010.
