= 2005 Wilkes-Barre/Scranton Pioneers season =

The 2005 Wilkes-Barre/Scranton Pioneers season was the team's fifth season as a member of the af2 and the second under head coach Les Moss. The team ended with a 9–7 record and qualified for the playoffs, but the Pioneers fell to the Florida Firecats for the second straight year. Following the season, Moss left the team to be an assistant coach with the Orlando Predators, leaving the team looking for its fifth head coach for its fifth season.

== Schedule ==
=== Regular season ===
Week	Date	Opponent	Result	Record	Game site
1	April 1, 2005	Oklahoma City Yard Dawgz	W 59–47	1–0	Wachovia Arena
2	April 10, 2005	Quad City Steamwheelers	W 64–28	2–0	Wachovia Arena
3	April 15, 2005	Albany Conquest	W 55–37	3–0	Times Union Center
4	April 22, 2005	Louisville Fire	L 58–50	3–1	Wachovia Arena
5	April 30, 2005	Green Bay Blizzard	L 48–40	3–2	Wachovia Arena
6	Bye				
7	May 14, 2005	Quad City Steamwheelers	W 57–55	4–2	iWireless Center
8	May 21, 2005	Rio Grande Valley Dorados	L 52–49	4–3	Dodge Arena
9	May 27, 2005	Manchester Wolves	L 46–33	4–4	Wachovia Arena
10	June 3, 2005	Green Bay Blizzard	W 38–24	5–4	Resch Center
11	June 11, 2005	Albany Conquest	W 43–34	6–4	Wachovia Arena
12	June 18, 2005	Macon Knights	L 41–53	6–5	Macon Coliseum
13	June 25, 2005	South Georgia Wildcats	W 65–46	7–5	Albany Civic Center
14	Bye				
15	July 8, 2005	Manchester Wolves	L 63–36	7–6	Verizon Wireless Arena
16	July 16, 2005	Florida Firecats	L 48–47 (OT)	7–7	Germain Arena
17	July 23, 2005	Albany Conquest	W 54–47	8–7	Wachovia Arena
18	July 30, 2005	Macon Knights	W 53–52	9–7	Wachovia Arena

=== Postseason ===
Week	Date	Opponent	Result	Record	Game site
1	August 6, 2005	Green Bay Blizzard	W 48–41	1–0	Wachovia Arena
2	August 13, 2005	Florida Firecats	L 59–45	1–1	Germain Arena

== Final standings ==
American Conference East Division
Team	Overall			Division		
Team	Wins	Losses	Percentage	Wins	Losses	Percentage
Manchester Wolves	12	4	0.750	8	1	0.888
Louisville Fire	11	5	0.687	4	3	0.571
Green Bay Blizzard	9	7	0.562	4	4	0.500
Wilkes-Barre/Scranton Pioneers	9	7	0.562	4	4	0.500
Albany Conquest	4	12	0.250	1	9	0.100

== Attendance ==
Week	Opponent	Attendance
1	Oklahoma City Yard Dawgz	5,105
2	Quad City Steamwheelers	4,532
4	Louisville Fire	4,360
5	Green Bay Blizzard	4,846
9	Manchester Wolves	4,422
11	Albany Conquest	4,462
17	Albany Conquest	4,427
18	Macon Knights	4,053
Playoff	Opponent	Attendance
1	Green Bay Blizzard	3,102
Total		39,309
Average		4,368
