= Antonio Dingle =

American football player (born 1976)

No. 74
- Position: Defensive tackle

Personal information
- Born: October 7, 1976 (age 50); Fayetteville, North Carolina, U.S.

Career information
- High school: Fork Union Military Academy (Fork Union, Virginia)
- College: Virginia
- NFL draft: 1999: 7th round, 214th overall pick

Career history
- Green Bay Packers (1999); Carolina Panthers (1999); Scottish Claymores (2000–2001); Las Vegas Outlaws (2001); Carolina Cobras (2002)*; Rochester Brigade (2002); New York Dragons (2003)*; Rochester Brigade (2003); Tulsa Talons (2004); Quad City Steamwheelers (2005); Oklahoma City Yard Dawgz (2005); Central Valley Coyotes (2005); Florida Firecats (2005–2008); Fayetteville Force (2011); Cape Fear Heroes (2013–2017)
- * Offseason or practice squad member only

Awards and highlights
- SIF champion (2017); First-team All-ACC (1997)

Career NFL statistics
- Games played: 9
- Tackles: 2
- Stats at Pro Football Reference

Antonio Demetric Dingle (born October 7, 1976) is an American former professional football player who was a defensive tackle in the National Football League (NFL) for the Green Bay Packers and the Carolina Panthers. He played college football for the Virginia Cavaliers before being selected by the Pittsburgh Steelers in the seventh round of the 1999 NFL draft. Dingle played for the Packers and Panthers in 1999. On March 25, 2002, Dingle signed with the Carolina Cobras. He has also played for the Rochester Brigade, New York Dragons, Tulsa Talons, Quad City Steamwheelers, Oklahoma City Yard Dawgz, Central Valley Coyotes, Florida Firecats, and Fayetteville Force.
