= D. Bryant =

American football player (born 1980)

Profile
- Position: Quarterback

Personal information
- Born: October 22, 1980 (age 46); Detroit, Michigan, U.S.
- Listed height: 6 ft 2 in (1.88 m)
- Listed weight: 215 lb (98 kg)

Career information
- High school: Cass Technical (Detroit)
- College: Iowa Wesleyan
- NFL draft: 2003: undrafted

Career history
- Albany Conquest (2004–2005); Manchester Wolves (2006); South Georgia Wildcats (2007); Georgia Force* (2008); Kansas City Brigade (2008); New Orleans VooDoo (2011)
- * Offseason or practice squad member only

Awards and highlights
- First-team All-af2 (2007); AFL All-Rookie Team (2008)

Career AFL statistics
- Completions: 347
- Attempts: 532
- Yards: 3784
- Touchdowns: 65
- Interceptions: 20

D. Bryant (born October 22, 1980) is an American former football quarterback.

== Early life ==
Born the son of Marvin and Brenda Bryant, D. attended Cass Technical High School, in Detroit, Michigan. There he lettered in four sports; football, basketball, baseball and track and field. He was named All-City twice in football, garnering All-State honors as well as named to Michigan's 'Dream Team' as a senior. Played both safety and quarterback. A standout basketball player, garnering All-City honors twice including the City Championship in 1998. He averaged 18 points and over seven rebounds for his prep career playing guard. Only played one year of baseball as a sophomore, playing third base. Shined in track and field, claiming the City Championship in the 4x100 meter relay as a senior. Finished fifth in the state in 1998 on the 4x200 meter relay team.

== College career ==
=== Duke ===
Bryant was a dual sport athlete at Duke University playing football and basketball.

During his freshman year, 1998–1999, Bryant was a reserve with Duke University's basketball team. The Blue Devils went 37–2 overall and were undefeated in the Atlantic Coast Conference. They finished #2 in the country after losing the 1999 national championship game to the University of Connecticut. Three of his teammates later had long professional careers: i.e., Shane Battier, Elton Brand, and Corey Maggette. Bryant did not play basketball after his freshman year, concentrating exclusively on football.

Bryant became the starting quarterback at Duke midway through the 2000 season (when he was a sophomore) and continued in that role as a junior. During his junior season, he passed for 2,454 yards and 11 touchdowns. Duke's football program was somewhat less successful than the basketball program during those years. The team went 0–11 both years while Bryant was on the active roster.

In 2002, after failing to be eligible because of academic reasons, Bryant decided to transfer.

=== Iowa Wesleyan ===
D. transferred after his junior season to Iowa Wesleyan College. He played in only one game for Iowa Wesleyan in 2002, tossing for 313 yards and five touchdowns in a win against Peru State College. After the season, Bryant was one of 12 quarterbacks that received an invite the 2003 NFL Scouting Combine.

== Professional career ==
=== Albany Conquest ===
On May 8, 2004, Bryant was named the starting quarterback for the Albany Conquest.

=== Manchester Wolves ===
On March 31, 2006, it was announced that D. had signed with the Manchester Wolves.

=== South Georgia Wildcats ===
In 2007, he became a member of the South Georgia Wildcats, where he became only the third quarterback in AF2 history to throw for 100 career touchdowns and set the single-season passing record (4,680 yards). The team went 10–6, losing in the National Conference Semifinals, 49–28 to the Tulsa Talons.

=== Georgia Force ===
He was signed by the Georgia Force in 2008, but was released before training camp started.

=== Kansas City Brigade ===
The Kansas City Brigade gave Bryant a chance, with a 2-day camp invite, where he won a spot on the roster. For the season, Bryant completed 215 of 317 passes, for 2,338 yards, with 40 touchdowns and 11 interceptions. Those numbers were impressive enough to get him named to the 2008 AFL All Rookie Team.

=== New Orleans VooDoo ===
On May 18, 2011, Bryant was named the starting quarterback for the New Orleans VooDoo. He started for the struggling Danny Wimprine.

=== Point University ===
On January 3, 2012, Bryant join the coaching staff at Point University as the assistant football coach for quarterbacks.
