= Matthew Sauk =

American football player and coach (born 1976)

No. 7
- Position: Quarterback

Personal information
- Born: March 15, 1976 (age 50)
- Listed height: 6 ft 1 in (1.85 m)
- Listed weight: 225 lb (102 kg)

Career information
- High school: Woodbridge (Irvine, California)
- College: Utah State
- NFL draft: 1998: undrafted

Career history

Playing
- Nashville Kats (2000)*; Tennessee Valley Vipers (2001); Los Angeles Avengers (2002); Tennessee Valley Vipers (2003); Louisville Fire (2004–2005); Philadelphia Soul (2006); Grand Rapids Rampage (2007); Arizona Rattlers (2008)
- * Offseason or practice squad member only

Coaching
- Spokane Shock (QB/WR) (2008); Spokane Shock (AHC/OC) (2010); Utah Blaze (OC) (2011–2013); Portland Thunder (2014); Los Angeles KISS (OC) (2015); Orlando Predators (OC) (2016); Salt Lake Screaming Eagles (2017); Columbus Destroyers (2019)

Awards and highlights
- ArenaBowl champion (2010); af2 Offensive Player of the Year (2005); af2 Rookie of the Year (2001); Second-team All-Big West (1997); 2× Net10 Assistant Coach of the Year (2011, 2012)

Career AFL statistics
- Comp. / Att.: 252 / 406
- Passing yards: 2,721
- TD–INT: 54–13
- QB rating: 101.64
- Rushing TDs: 1
- Stats at ArenaFan.com

Head coaching record
- Regular season: 6–26 (.188)
- Postseason: 0–1 (.000)
- Career: 6–27 (.182)

Matthew Sauk (born March 15, 1976) is an American former football quarterback and coach. He played college football at Utah State, was an af2 quarterback from 2001 to 2005, and an Arena Football League (AFL) quarterback from 2002 to 2008. He began his coaching career in 2008. After being the offensive coordinator for the Utah Blaze from 2011 to 2013, he became the Portland Thunder head coach in 2014. He was the head coach of the Salt Lake Screaming Eagles of the Indoor Football League (IFL) in 2017 and the Columbus Destroyers of the Arena Football League in 2019.

== Early life ==
Sauk attended Detroit Catholic Central High School during the 1990–91 school year. Sauk transferred to Woodbridge High School in Irvine, California for his final three years of high school.

== College career ==
=== Orange Coast College ===
Sauk attended Orange Coast College after graduation high school, where he continued his football career for the Pirates.

=== Utah State ===
Sauk's play at Orange Coast earned him a scholarship to Utah State University, where he continued his football career with the Aggies. Sauk started for two years, earning second-team All-Big West Conference in 1997, while leading the Aggies to the 1997 Humanitarian Bowl.

== Professional career ==
Sauk spent parts of eight seasons bouncing between the af2 and Arena Football League. In 2001, he was named the af2 Rookie of the Year while playing for the Tennessee Valley Vipers. In 2005, he was named the af2 Offensive Player of the Year while playing for the Louisville Fire.

== Coaching career ==
=== Spokane Shock ===
Sauk joined the Spokane Shock in 2008 as a quarterback and wide receivers coach. After taking 2009 off, Sauk rejoined the Shock in 2010 as the team's offensive coordinator. The Shock won ArenaBowl XXIII under Sauk's offensive guidance.

=== Utah Blaze ===
Sauk joined the Utah Blaze in 2011 as the team's offensive coordinator. During his first two seasons with the Blaze, Sauk was named the Net10 Assistant Coach of the Year, helping quarterback Tommy Grady win the 2012 Arena Football League Most Valuable Player Award.

=== Portland Thunder ===
On October 8, 2013, Sauk was named the head coach of the Portland Thunder that began play in 2014. Sauk was let go following a disappointing 5–13 season and a playoff berth.

=== Los Angeles KISS ===
Sauk was hired by the Los Angeles KISS in 2015 to be the team's offensive coordinator.

=== Orlando Predators ===
On October 19, 2015, Sauk was hired to become the Orlando Predators's offensive coordinator.

=== Salt Lake Screaming Eagles ===
On March 6, 2017, Sauk was hired to become the Salt Lake Screaming Eagles's head coach after the third week into the IFL season.

=== Columbus Destroyers ===
On February 22, 2019, Sauk was named Head Coach of the Columbus Destroyers for the team's return to the Arena Football League for the 2019 season.

=== AFL head coaching record ===
Team	Year	Regular season				Postseason			
Team	Year	Won	Lost	Win %	Finish	Won	Lost	Win %	Result
UTAH	2011	0	2	.000	3rd in NC West	–	–	–	–
POR	2014	5	13	.278	3rd in NC Pacific	0	1	.000	Lost to Arizona Rattlers in Conference Semifinals
COL	2019	1	11	.083	6th in AFL	–	–	–	–
Total		6	26	.188		0	1	.000	
