= Danny Kight =

American football player (born 1998)

No. 2, 7, 12
- Position: Kickoff specialist

Personal information
- Born: August 18, 1971 (age 55); Atlanta, Georgia, U.S.
- Listed height: 6 ft 1 in (1.85 m)
- Listed weight: 214 lb (97 kg)

Career information
- High school: Druid Hills (Druid Hills, Georgia)
- College: Augusta State (soccer)

Career history
- San Diego Chargers (1996)*; Dallas Cowboys (1997)*; Washington Redskins (1998); → Rhein Fire (1998); Tampa Bay Buccaneers (1999)*; Cleveland Browns (1999)*; Indianapolis Colts (1999–2000); → Rhein Fire (2000); Baltimore Ravens (2001); New York Jets (2003)*; Louisville Fire (2004–2005, 2007–2008); Arizona Rattlers (2005); Columbus Destroyers (2006)
- * Offseason or practice squad member only
- Stats at Pro Football Reference
- Stats at ArenaFan.com

Edward Oliver "Danny" Kight (born August 18, 1971) is an American former professional football kickoff specialist who played three seasons in the National Football League (NFL) with the Indianapolis Colts and Baltimore Ravens. He played college soccer at Augusta State University.

== Early life ==
Edward Oliver Kight was born on August 18, 1971, in Atlanta, Georgia. He played soccer and football at Druid Hills High School in Druid Hills, Georgia. He was a kicker on the football team. He played college soccer at Division II Augusta State University.

== Professional career ==
Kight joined an Augusta, Georgia semi-pro football team in 1996 and received a tryout with the San Diego Chargers after making a 63-yard field goal. He signed with the Chargers on April 23, 1996. He was later released on August 14, 1996.

Kight signed with the Dallas Cowboys on April 15, 1997. He was released on August 12, 1997.

Kight was signed by the Washington Redskins on February 11, 1998. He was allocated to NFL Europe to play for the Rhein Fire. He converted five of 12 field goals and also posted one special teams tackle for the Fire during the 1998 NFL Europe season. On July 20, 1998, the Redskins placed him on the reserve/non-football injury list. Kight was released by the Redskins on September 22, 1998.

Kight signed with the Tampa Bay Buccaneers on April 7, 1999, but was soon waived on April 19, 1999.

Kight was claimed off waivers by the Cleveland Browns on April 20, 1999. He was later released on August 25, 1999.

Through the first four games of the 1999 NFL season, Indianapolis Colts placekicker Mike Vanderjagt and punter Hunter Smith had shared kickoff duties. On October 13, 1999, Kight signed with the Colts as a kickoff specialist and handled kickoff duties for the remainder of the season. He played in 12 games for the Colts that year, kicking off 66 times for 4,246 yards (64 yard average) and nine touchbacks while posting one assisted tackle. He also appeared in one playoff game that year and kicked off five times for 271 yards (54 yard average) and two touchbacks. In 2000, he was allocated to NFL Europe to play for the Fire again. He appeared in five games for Rhein during the 2000 NFL Europe season, converting three of five field goals (including a league record 56-yarder) before suffering a season-ending knee injury. Kight played in all 16 games for the Colts during the 2000 NFL season, recording 87 kickoffs for 5,619 yards (65 yard average) and 13 touchbacks. The Baltimore Sun later reported that "39 of Kight's 85 [sic] kickoffs" reached the endzone in 2000, which was the second-best ratio in the NFL. He also kicked off six times for 403 yards (67 yard average) and two touchbacks in one playoff game. Kight was released by the Colts the next year on August 21, 2001.

Kight signed with the Baltimore Ravens on October 23, 2001. He played in ten games for the Ravens, kicking off 48 times for 2,909 yards (61 yard average) and six touchbacks. He also appeared in two playoff games for the Ravens, kicking off eight times for 494 yards and a 62 yard average. Kight became a free agent after the 2001 season and re-signed with the Ravens. He was released on August 31, 2002.

Kight was signed by the New York Jets on May 2, 2003. He was released on August 18, 2003.

Kight played for the Louisville Fire of the af2 from 2004 to 2005 and again from 2007 to 2008.

Kight signed with the Arizona Rattlers of the Arena Football League (AFL) on February 25, 2005. He played in one game for the Rattlers, converting one of three extra points while missing one field goal.

On February 18, 2006, Kight signed with the AFL's Columbus Destroyers as an emergency kicker after Mark Lewis was placed on emergency hold. Kight was waived on February 20 after Lewis returned. Kight re-signed with Columbus as an emergency kicker again on February 23, but was waived again on February 27. He was signed as an emergency kicker for the third time on March 2, and was waived for the final time on March 6, 2006. Overall, Kight played in three games for the Destroyers during the 2006 season, converting two of six field goals and 15 of 17 extra points while also posting one solo tackle.
