= Rico Reese =

American football player (born 1983)

No. 24
- Position: Defensive end

Personal information
- Born: April 5, 1983 (age 43); East Point, Georgia, U.S.
- Listed height: 6 ft 2 in (1.88 m)
- Listed weight: 252 lb (114 kg)

Career information
- High school: Pebblebrook High School
- College: Western Carolina University
- NFL draft: 2006: undrafted

Career history
- Macon Knights (2006); Birmingham Steeldogs (2007); Tennessee Valley Vipers (2008); Alabama Vipers (2010); Kansas City Command (2011); Georgia Force (2011)

Awards and highlights
- 2008 Won AF2 Arena Cup Arena Football 2
- Stats at ArenaFan.com

Rico Lamar Reese (born April 5, 1983) is an American former professional football player in the af2 and Arena Football League (AFL). He played college football at Western Carolina University. Reese was a 1st Team All Southern Conference selection his senior season.

Reese played professionally with the af2's Macon Knights, Birmingham Steeldogs, and Tennessee Valley Vipers, and the AFL's Alabama Vipers, Kansas City Command, and Georgia Force. He has also spent time as a Health/Personal Fitness teacher for East Cobb Middle School.
