= Antwone Savage =

American football player (born 1981)

No. 6
- Position: Wide receiver

Personal information
- Born: March 29, 1981 (age 45); Albany, Georgia
- Listed height: 6 ft 1 in (1.85 m)
- Listed weight: 180 lb (82 kg)

Career information
- High school: Westover (Albany, Georgia)
- College: Oklahoma

Career history
- Arizona Cardinals (2003); South Georgia Wildcats (2005); Spokane Shock (2006–2007); South Georgia Wildcats (2008–2009); Oklahoma City Yard Dawgz (2010)*; Albany Panthers (2011–2012)
- * Offseason or practice squad member only

Awards and highlights
- BCS National champion (2000); af2 ArenaCup champion (2006); PIFL Cup champion (2012); Albany Sports Hall of Fame

Antwone Savage (born March 29, 1981) is an American former football wide receiver in the Arena Football League. He played for the Spokane Shock, Oklahoma City Yard Dawgz, and the Albany Panthers. He played college football for the Oklahoma Sooners.
