= Raul Vijil =

American football player (born 1982)

No. 15
- Position: Wide receiver

Personal information
- Born: September 12, 1982 (age 44); Pasco, Washington, U.S.
- Listed height: 5 ft 9 in (1.75 m)
- Listed weight: 185 lb (84 kg)

Career information
- High school: Pasco (WA)
- College: Eastern Washington
- NFL draft: 2006: undrafted

Career history
- Spokane Shock (2006–2011)

Awards and highlights
- ArenaBowl champion (2010); 2× ArenaCup champion (2006, 2009); 2× First-team All-af2 (2008, 2009); No. 15 retired by Spokane Shock

Career AFL statistics
- Receptions: 150
- Receiving yards: 1,832
- Receiving TDs: 53
- Return yards: 549
- Return TDs: 2
- Stats at ArenaFan.com

Raul Vijil (born September 12, 1982) is an American former football wide receiver for the Spokane Shock of the Arena Football League (AFL). He played college football at Eastern Washington, and played for the Shock of af2 and the Arena Football League from 2006 to 2011.

== Early life ==
Vijil attended Pasco High School in Pasco, Washington, where he was a member of the school's soccer team. It wasn't until his senior year of high school that he joined the football team. Vijil helped the Bulldogs to a 14–0 record, en route to a 2000 State Championship. Vijil's 204 receiving yards still stand as a Washington state record for receiving yards in a state title game.

== College career ==
Vijil's senior season of high school football was outstanding enough to earn him a scholarship to Eastern Washington University as a member of the football team.

== Professional career ==
As soon as Vijil graduated, he was recruited by Chris Siegfried to play for the expansion Spokane Shock of the af2. He recorded 421 career receptions for 4,952 yards and 131 touchdowns during his career with the Shock from 2006 to 2011. He rejoined the Shock in 2013 as a public figure and representative for the team before retiring in 2015. His jersey number 15 was retired by the Shock in May 2015.
