= Robert Gill (gridiron football) =

American gridiron football player (born 1984)

No. 10
- Position: Wide receiver

Personal information
- Born: February 27, 1984 (age 42); San Antonio, Texas, U.S.
- Listed height: 5 ft 10 in (1.78 m)
- Listed weight: 180 lb (82 kg)

Career information
- High school: San Antonio (TX) East Central
- College: Texas State

Career history
- Green Bay Blizzard (2008)*; Louisville Fire (2008)*; Texas Copperheads (2008); Lubbock Renegades (2008); Hamilton Tiger-Cats (2009)*; Milwaukee Iron (2009); Dallas Vigilantes (2010)*; Abilene Ruff Riders (2010); Kansas City Command (2011–2012); San Antonio Talons (2013)*; Arizona Cardinals (2013)*; Toronto Argonauts (2014)
- * Offseason or practice squad member only
- Stats at CFL.ca (archive)

Robert Gill (born February 27, 1984) is an American former professional football wide receiver. Gill did not play college football.

== College career ==
Gill played basketball at Texas A&M University–Corpus Christi before transferring to Texas State, where he competed in track & field, running the 200-meter dash in 21.14 seconds and the 400-meter dash in 46.52 seconds.

== Professional career ==
Gill signed with the Green Bay Blizzard but was cut before the 2008 af2 season started. He signed with the Louisville Fire but never played for them and was traded to the Texas Copperheads. After two games with the Copperheads, Gill was released and signed by the Lubbock Renegades. In July 2009, Gill signed with the Milwaukee Iron. He played for the Abilene Ruff Riders in 2010. He played for the Kansas City Command in 2011 and 2012. Gill signed with the Arizona Cardinals in April 2013. In June 2013, Gill posted a video of himself running 25 mph on a treadmill to YouTube. The video has over 3,000,000 views. The Cardinals released Gill and Robby Toma on August 21, 2013. Gill signed with the Toronto Argonauts prior to the 2014 season. He was released by the Argonauts on November 11, 2014.

== Personal life ==
His mother, Marie, moved to San Antonio from Panama.
