= Kevin Beard =

American football player and coach (born 1981)

Miami Hurricanes
- Title: Wide receivers coach

Personal information
- Born: January 20, 1981 (age 45); Fort Lauderdale, Florida, U.S.
- Listed height: 6 ft 1 in (1.85 m)
- Listed weight: 192 lb (87 kg)

Career information
- High school: Plantation (FL)
- College: Miami (FL)
- NFL draft: 2004: undrafted

Career history

Playing
- South Georgia Wildcats (2005); Spokane Shock (2006); Kansas City Brigade (2007); Chicago Rush (2007)

Coaching
- University High School (WR) (2010–2013); Miami (FL) (2014–2015); ADFO (2014); WR/PGC (2015); Georgia (OQC) (2016); Tennessee (WR) (2017); Toledo (2018–2022); RC (2018); WR (2019–2022); Miami (FL) (WR) (2023–present)

Awards and highlights
- BCS national champion (2001); ArenaCup Champion (2006)

Career AFL statistics
- Receptions: 10
- Receiving yards: 87
- Receiving TDs: 0
- Stats at ArenaFan.com

Kevin Leon Beard (born January 20, 1981) is an American football coach and former player who is the wide receivers coach for University of Miami. He played college football at the University of Miami for Larry Coker, and afterward played professionally in the AF2 from 2005 to 2006, and in the Arena Football League in 2007. In 2015, Beard returned to Miami as the wide receivers coach.

== Early life ==
Beard attended Plantation High School in Plantation, Florida and was a student and a standout in football and basketball. In football, as a junior, he made 50 receptions for 850 yards (17.00 yards per reception) and 15 touchdowns. As a senior, he was a first team All-Broward County selection, a second team All-State selection, and was named by the South Florida Sun-Sentinel as a Broward County co-Offensive Player of the Year. In basketball, as a senior, he was a second team All-State selection. Beard graduated from Plantation High School in 1999.

== College career ==
Beard attended the University of Miami in Coral Gables, Florida from 1999 to 2003. After redshirting in 1999, he played mostly on special teams and as a reserve in 2000. During Miami's national championship season in 2001, he caught 25 passes for 409 yards, adding four catches for 41 yards in Miami's Rose Bowl win over Nebraska at the end of the season. He caught 23 passes for 262 yards and four touchdowns in 2002 before suffering a season ending knee injury. Beard was a captain of Miami's 11–2 2003 squad, contributing 19 catches for 249 yards and a touchdown. Beard's teammates at Miami included future Pro Bowl wide receivers Andre Johnson, Santana Moss, and Reggie Wayne.

== Coaching career ==
Beard began his coaching career as the wide receivers coach at the University School in Davie, Florida, where he remained from 2010 to 2013. He was named assistant director of Football Operations at the University of Miami in August 2014. In 2015, he became Miami's wide receivers coach, though he was not retained by Miami's new head coach Mark Richt in 2016. Beard worked as a quality control assistant at Georgia during the 2016 season before accepting a job as wide receivers coach at Florida International in December of that year.

In February 2017, Beard was hired as the wide receivers coach at the University of Tennessee, reuniting with fellow former Miami staffer and interim coach Larry Scott, who had been hired as the Vols' offensive coordinator following the 2016 season.

Since 2022, Kevin Beard has coached WR’s at the University of Miami. Under his guidance he has produced an AP 1st team All American, Xavier Restrepo. His WR room in 2024 produced was the only group in the country to have 4 WR’s over 500 yards receiving. (Syracuse had 5 players have 500+ receiving)
