= James MacPherson (American football) =

American gridiron football player and coach (born 1980)

No. 16
- Position: Quarterback

Personal information
- Born: September 2, 1980 (age 46)
- Listed height: 6 ft 2 in (1.88 m)
- Listed weight: 197 lb (89 kg)

Career information
- High school: Mountain View (Tucson, Arizona)
- College: Wake Forest
- NFL draft: 2003: undrafted

Career history

Playing
- Indianapolis Colts (2003)*; Hamilton Tiger-Cats (2004)*; Colorado Crush (2005)*; Philadelphia Soul (2006)*; Green Bay Blizzard (2006); Georgia Force (2007); Grand Rapids Rampage (2007–2008)
- * Offseason or practice squad member only

Coaching
- Mountain View Mountain Lions (2003–2004); Tortolita Junior High School (2006); Mountain View Mountain Lions (2008); Pima Aztecs (2009) (QB); Florida Tuskers (2010) (assistant); Sacramento Mountain Lions (2011–2012) (RB); Pima Aztecs (2013) (QB)

Career AFL statistics
- Comp. / Att.: 321 / 471
- Passing yards: 4,011
- TD–INT: 88–16
- QB rating: 119.79
- Rushing TDs: 8
- Stats at ArenaFan.com

James MacPherson (born September 2, 1980) is an American former professional football quarterback who played two seasons in the Arena Football League (AFL) with the Georgia Force and Grand Rapids Rampage. He played college football at Wake Forest University. He was also a member of the Indianapolis Colts, Hamilton Tiger-Cats, Colorado Crush, Philadelphia Soul, and Green Bay Blizzard.

== Early life ==
MacPherson played high school football at Mountain View High School in Tucson, Arizona, where he was a three-year letterman at quarterback. He also earned All-Southern Arizona honors as both a quarterback and punter in 1997. MacPherson recorded 2,500 passing yards and 800 rushing yards during his career. He completed more than 56 percent of his passes. He earned all-region honors as a shortstop and pitcher in baseball. MacPherson also earned a spot on the honor roll and was named a "Scholar-Athlete" by the Arizona Interscholastic Association.

== College career ==
MacPherson played for the Wake Forest Demon Deacons of Wake Forest University from 1999 to 2002. He was redshirted in 1998. He recorded 16 touchdowns on 4,716 passing yards for the Demon Deacons. MacPherson earned MVP honors in the 2002 Seattle Bowl. He was also named to the Academic All-ACC Team as a senior and finished his career ranked No. 7 all-time in school history for passing yards. He also occasionally served as the team's punter during his college career.

== Professional career ==
MacPherson spent the 2003 off-season with the Indianapolis Colts of the National Football League (NFL) after going undrafted in the 2003 NFL draft. He played in all four preseason games and was released by the team on August 31, 2003.

He signed with the Hamilton Tiger-Cats of the Canadian Football League in March 2004 and was released by the Tiger-Cats on June 9, 2004.

MacPherson was signed by the Colorado Crush of the Arena Football League (AFL) on January 6, 2005, and released by the team on January 20, 2005.

He signed with the Philadelphia Soul of the AFL on January 12, 2006, and was released on January 20, 2006.

He played for the Green Bay Blizzard of the af2 in 2006, recording 36 touchdowns on 2,241 passing yards as the Blizzard advanced to ArenaCup VII.

MacPherson played for the Georgia Force of the AFL in 2007 and was the backup to Chris Greisen.

James signed with the Grand Rapids Rampage of the AFL on October 31, 2007. He recorded 88 touchdowns on 4,011 passing yards while also scoring eight rushing touchdowns for the Rampage in 2008.

== Career statistics ==
=== AFL ===
| Year | Team | Passing | | | | | | | Rushing | | |
| Year | Team | Cmp | Att | Pct | Yds | TD | Int | Rtg | Att | Yds | TD |
|---|---|---|---|---|---|---|---|---|---|---|---|
| 2007 | Georgia | 3 | 4 | 75.0 | 41 | 1 | 0 | 146.88 | 0 | 0 | 0 |
| 2008 | Grand Rapids | 318 | 467 | 68.1 | 3,970 | 87 | 16 | 119.56 | 34 | 115 | 8 |
| Career | | 321 | 471 | 68.2 | 4,011 | 88 | 16 | 119.79 | 34 | 115 | 8 |

=== College ===
| Year | Team | Passing | | | | | | | | Rushing | | | | Punting | | |
| Year | Team | Cmp | Att | Pct | Yds | Y/A | TD | Int | Rtg | Att | Yds | Avg | TD | Pnt | Yds | Avg |
|---|---|---|---|---|---|---|---|---|---|---|---|---|---|---|---|---|
| 1999 | Wake Forest | 0 | 0 | 0.0 | 0 | 0.0 | 0 | 0 | 0.0 | 0 | 0 | 0.0 | 0 | 6 | 270 | 45.0 |
| 2000 | Wake Forest | 113 | 207 | 54.6 | 1,324 | 6.4 | 3 | 6 | 107.3 | 24 | -57 | -2.4 | 0 | 1 | 36 | 36.0 |
| 2001 | Wake Forest | 113 | 209 | 54.1 | 1,555 | 7.4 | 5 | 11 | 113.9 | 63 | 111 | 1.8 | 1 | 12 | 509 | 42.4 |
| 2002 | Wake Forest | 123 | 223 | 55.2 | 1,837 | 8.2 | 8 | 4 | 132.6 | 68 | 177 | 2.6 | 1 | 0 | 0 | 0.0 |
| Career | | 349 | 639 | 54.6 | 4,716 | 7.4 | 16 | 21 | 118.3 | 155 | 231 | 1.5 | 2 | 19 | 815 | 42.9 |

== Coaching career ==
MacPherson was a coach for the Mountain View Mountain Lions of Mountain View High School from 2003 to 2004.

He coached at Tortolita Junior High School in 2006.

He was a coach for the Mountain View Mountain Lions in 2008.

MacPherson was quarterbacks and offensive quality control coach for the Pima Aztecs of Pima Community College in 2009.

He served as offensive quality control coach for the Florida Tuskers of the United Football League (UFL) in 2010.

He was running backs coach of the Sacramento Mountain Lions of the UFL from 2011 to 2012.

MacPherson returned as quarterbacks coach of the Pima Aztecs in 2013.

== Scouting career ==
MacPherson was hired as a college scout for the San Diego Chargers in May 2014.
