= Wally English =

American football coach (born 1939)

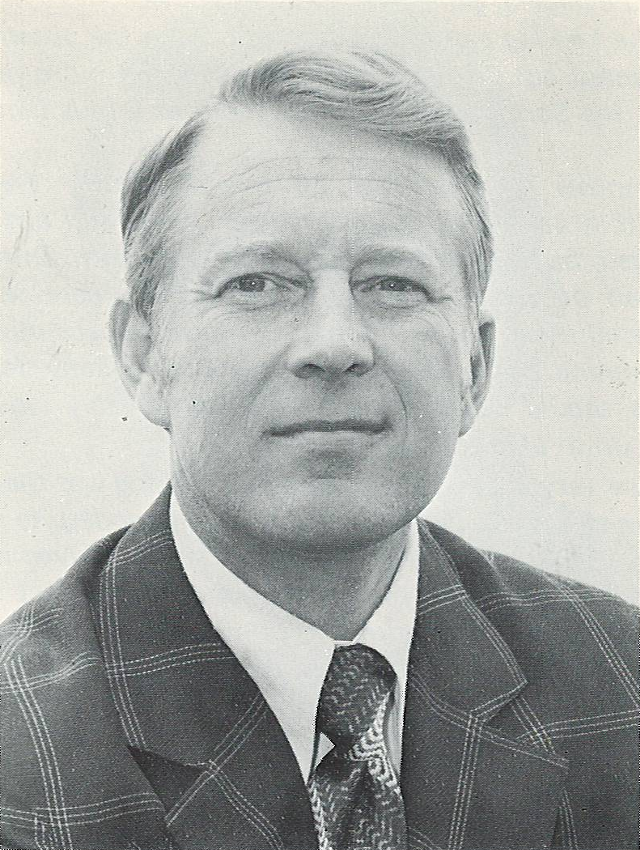
- English, c. 1972

Biographical details
- Born: June 28, 1934; Louisville, Kentucky, U.S.
- Died: April 17, 2024 (aged 89); Kentucky, U.S.
- Education: University of Louisville

Coaching career (HC unless noted)
- 1966–1968: Kentucky (QB)
- 1977: Detroit Lions (OB)
- 1978: BYU (OC/QB)
- 1979: Pittsburgh (OC/WR)
- 1980: Pittsburgh (OC/QB)
- 1981–1982: Miami Dolphins (QB/WR)
- 1983–1984: Tulane
- 1989: Palermo Cardinals, Italy
- 1992: Ohio Glory (OC/QB/WR)
- 1997: Hawaii (OC)
- 2003: Louisville Fire
- 2008: Palermo Corsari, Italy

Head coaching record
- Overall: 5–17

Wallace Gregory English (June 28, 1934 – April 17, 2024) was an American football coach. He coached in the National Football League (NFL) and served as a head coach in college football for the Tulane Green Wave.

== Career ==
English was on Tommy Hudspeth's coaching staff with the Detroit Lions until the entire group was dismissed on January 9, 1978. He was offensive coordinator for the Pittsburgh Panthers under Jackie Sherrill in 1979 and 1980, where he coached future Hall of Fame quarterback Dan Marino. English was hired by Don Shula to be the Miami Dolphins' quarterbacks and receivers coach in 1981 and 1982. The Dolphins played in Super Bowl XVII following the strike-shortened 1982 season, but lost to the Washington Redskins.

English was the head football coach at Tulane University from 1983 to 1984, compiling a record of 5–17 (7–15 on the field; 1983 wins vs. Ole Miss and Florida State were forfeited when his son, quarterback Jon English, played in violation of NCAA eligibility rules).

In August 1988, English was hired to coach the revived Southeastern Louisiana Lions football team. He was fired three months later, without ever coaching a game, due to "philosophical differences" with athletic director Bob Brodhead.

In 2003, English was hired to replace Jeff Brohm as the head coach of the Louisville Fire af2 team. He was fired after just two games with a record of 1–1.

English died in April 2024, aged 89.

== Head coaching record ==
=== College ===
Year	Team	Overall	Conference	Standing	Bowl/playoffs
Tulane Green Wave (NCAA Division I-AA independent) (1983–1984)
1983	Tulane	2–9			
1984	Tulane	3–8			
Tulane:		5–17			
Total:		5–17			

=== af2 ===
Team	Year	Regular season					Postseason			
Team	Year	Won	Lost	Ties	Win %	Finish	Won	Lost	Win %	Result
LOU	2003	1	1	0	.500	-	-	-	-	
LOU Total		1	1	0	.500		0	0	–	
Total		1	1	0	.500		0	0	–	
