= Bubby =

Bubby is a nickname which may refer to:

- Bubby Brister (born 1962), American former National Football League quarterback
- Bubby Dacer (1934–2000), publicist in the Philippines who was murdered
- Bubby Jones (1941–2020), American race car driver and member of the National Sprint Car Hall of Fame
- Bubby Gill (born 1984), American football player
- Bubby Rossman (born 1992), American Major League Baseball pitcher
- Greg Heffley, a fictional character often referred to as Bubby by his little brother Manny Heffley
- Bub or Bubby, one of the main characters in the Bubble Bobble video game series
