= Richmond Speed =

Arena football team

Logo

General information
- Founded: 1999
- Folded: 2003
- Headquartered: Richmond Coliseum in Richmond, Virginia
- Colors: Blue, black, white

Team history
- Richmond Speed (2000–2002)

Home fields
- Richmond Coliseum (2000–2003)

League / conference affiliations
- AF2 (2000–2003): American Conference (2000–2003); Northeast Division (2001); Atlantic Division (2002–2003)

Championships
- Conference championships: 1: 2001
- Division championships: 1: 2001

Playoff appearances (2)
- 2001, 2002

The Richmond Speed were one of the original 15 teams to join the inaugural 2000 AF2 season. They started off in the American Conference in 2000, before going over to the Northeast Division in 2001, then to the Atlantic Division from 2002–2003.

In 2000, Richmond went 7-9 and missed the playoffs. 2001 was a banner year for the Speed. Going 13-3, they cruised through the playoffs and into the ArenaCup. Despite going into the game with high expectations, they lost to the defending champion Quad City Steamwheelers. In 2002, the Speed proved that they were not a one-time wonder, and went to the playoffs again. This time, they were out by Week 1, thanks to the Cape Fear Wildcats. Back-to-back post-season losses was too much to handle, as in 2003, they went 6-10, last in the Atlantic Division. The Speed folded after the 2003 season, leaving Richmond without indoor football until the 2005 arrival of the AIFL Richmond Bandits.

== Season-by-season ==
Season records
| Season | W | L | T | Finish | Playoff results |
|---|---|---|---|---|---|
| 2000 | 7 | 9 | 0 | 5th AC | |
| 2001 | 13 | 3 | 0 | 1st AC Northeast | Won Round 1 (Richmond 67, Birmingham 60); Won American Conference Championship (Richmond 51, Tennessee Valley 50); Lost ArenaCup II (Quad City 55, Richmond 51) |
| 2002 | 13 | 3 | 0 | 2nd AC Atlantic | Lost Week 1 (Cape Fear 58, Richmond 47) |
| 2003 | 6 | 10 | 0 | 5th AC Atlantic | -- |
| Totals | 41 | 26 | 0 | (including AF2 playoffs) | |

== Notable players ==
Shayne Graham, NFL kicker who played in one game during the 2000 season.
