= ArenaCup =

Af2 Championship League

The ArenaCup was the af2's championship game. For the league's first five years, it was held at the arena of the higher seeded team. However, the 2005 ArenaCup was the first to be played at a neutral site in Bossier City, Louisiana. The 2006 ArenaCup was played in Coliseo de Puerto Rico in San Juan. On August 25, 2007, ArenaCup 8 returned to Bossier City, LA. ArenaCup 9 was played at the arena of the higher seeded team, the Spokane Shock. ArenaCup 10 was held at the Orleans Arena in Paradise, Nevada.

For the 2000 and 2001 ArenaCups, the game was televised nationally by TNN (now Paramount Network), who carried AFL games at the time. However, when the AFL announced their televised games would be shown on NBC rather than TNN, the ArenaCup telecast was lost. The 2002 ArenaCup was televised by the Vision Network, and the 2003 game was televised by KWHB, a local station in Tulsa, Oklahoma. After having no television coverage in 2004, the game was telecast nationally by Fox Sports Net in 2005 and Comcast Sports Net in 2006.

The ArenaCup, along with all assets of af2, were purchased by Arena Football 1 (which became the second incarnation of the Arena Football League) in December 2009. Because that league uses the ArenaBowl as its championship, the ArenaCup was retired.

== Results ==
Game	Date	Winning team		Losing team		Site
ArenaCup I	August 10, 2000	Quad City Steamwheelers	68	Tennessee Valley Vipers	59	iWireless Center in Moline, Illinois
ArenaCup II	August 10, 2001	Quad City Steamwheelers	55	Richmond Speed	51	iWireless Center in Moline, Illinois
ArenaCup III	August 23, 2002	Peoria Pirates	65	Florida Firecats	47	Carver Arena in Peoria, Illinois
ArenaCup IV	August 23, 2003	Tulsa Talons	58	Macon Knights	40	Ford Center in Tulsa, Oklahoma
ArenaCup V	August 27, 2004	Florida Firecats	39	Peoria Pirates	26	Germain Arena in Estero, Florida
ArenaCup VI	August 27, 2005	Memphis Xplorers	63	Louisville Fire	41	CenturyTel Center in Bossier City, Louisiana
ArenaCup VII	August 26, 2006	Spokane Shock	57	Green Bay Blizzard	34	José Miguel Agrelot Coliseum in San Juan, Puerto Rico
ArenaCup VIII	August 25, 2007	Tulsa Talons	73	Wilkes-Barre/Scranton Pioneers	66	CenturyTel Center in Bossier City, Louisiana
ArenaCup IX	August 25, 2008	Tennessee Valley Vipers	56	Spokane Shock	55 (OT)	Spokane Veterans Memorial Arena in Spokane, Washington
ArenaCup X	August 22, 2009	Spokane Shock	74	Wilkes-Barre/Scranton Pioneers	27	Orleans Arena in Paradise, Nevada

== Most ArenaCup Championships won ==
Team	Championships	Winning years
Quad City Steamwheelers	2	2000, 2001
Tulsa Talons	2	2003, 2007
Spokane Shock	2	2006, 2009
Florida Firecats	1	2004
Memphis Xplorers	1	2005
Peoria Pirates	1	2002
Tennessee Valley Vipers	1	2008
