= Memphis Xplorers =

Arena football team

Logo

General information
- Founded: 2000
- Folded: 2006
- Headquartered: DeSoto Civic Center in Southaven, Mississippi
- Colors: Forest green, gold, white

Personnel
- Owner: Will Wolford
- General manager: Trey Medlock
- Head coach: Collins Sanders Jr. (2001); Danton Barto (2002–2006)

Team history
- Memphis Xplorers (2001–2006)

Home fields
- DeSoto Civic Center (2001–2006)

League / conference affiliations
- af2 (2001–2006): National Conference (2001–2003); South Central Division (2001); Central Division (2002–2003); American Conference (2004); Midsouthern Division (2004); National Conference (2005); Midwest Division (2005); American Conference (2006); Southern Division (2006)

Championships
- League championships: 1; 2005
- Conference championships: 1; 2005
- Division championships: 1; 2005

Playoff appearances (4)
- 2004, 2005, 2006

The Memphis Xplorers were a professional arena football team. They were a 2001 expansion member of the af2. They played their home games at DeSoto Civic Center in Southaven, Mississippi (a suburb of Memphis, Tennessee). The team's logo featured the likeness of the namesake of both the venue and the team, Spanish explorer Hernando de Soto.

On October 11, 2006, the team announced that they would not return for the 2007 season.

In October 2007, local teacher Patrick Smith and a partner purchased the Memphis Xplorers for $100,000. There were plans to bring the team back for the 2009 season, with the possibility of the team's name being changed to the Midsouth Mafia. These plans never came to fruition.

== Season-by-season ==
Season records
Season	W	L	T	Finish	Playoff results
2001	3	13	0	7th NC South Central	--
2002	5	11	0	4th NC Central	--
2003	6	10	0	3rd NC Central	--
2004	10	6	0	2nd AC Mid-South	Lost Round 1 (Florida 35, Memphis 33)
2005	13	3	0	1st NC Midwest	Won Round 2 (Memphis 71, Amarillo 30); Won National Conference Championship (Memphis 58, Rio Grande Valley 49); Won ArenaCup VI (Memphis 63, Louisville 41)
2006	11	5	0	2nd AC Southern	Won Round 1 (Memphis 83, Louisville 61); Lost Round 2 (Green Bay 67, Memphis 50)
Totals	52	50	0	(including playoffs)	
