= San Diego Riptide =

Arena football team

Logo

General information
- Founded: 2001
- Folded: 2005
- Headquartered: San Diego Sports Arena in San Diego, California
- Colors: Blue, silver, black, white

Personnel
- Owner: Scott Atkins / Gil Saidy / Jon Runyan
- General manager: Todd Marinovich
- Head coach: Cree Morris (2002); Mouse Davis (2003); Sean Ponder (2004–2005)

Team history
- San Diego Riptide (2001–2003)

Home fields
- San Diego Sports Arena (2002–2005)

League / conference affiliations
- AF2 (2002–2005): National Conference (2002–2005); Western Division (2002–2005)

Playoff appearances (1)
- 2002

The San Diego Riptide were a professional arena football team based in San Diego, California, that competed in the AF2. The team played its home games at the San Diego Sports Arena. The team was officially announced to the media on January 15, 2002. The Riptide was originally coached by Cree Morris, then Mouse Davis and finally by Sean Ponder.

The Riptide never officially announced that it had ceased operations, but never came back from its hiatus after the 2005 season, and the AF2 folded into the AFL following the latter's 2009 bankruptcy.

== Season-by-season ==
Season records
Season	W	L	T	Finish	Playoff results
2002	7	9	0	2nd NC Western	Won Round 1 (San Diego 40, Bakersfield 27); Lost NC Semifinals (Peoria 22, San Diego 12)
2003	6	10	0	4th NC Western	--
2004	8	8	0	3rd NC Western	--
2005	5	11	0	5th NC Western	--
Totals	27	39	0	(including playoffs)	

== See also ==
- Arena Football League
- AF2
