= Macon Knights =

Arena football team

Logo

General information
- Founded: 2000
- Folded: 2006
- Headquartered: Macon Coliseum in Macon, Georgia
- Colors: Blue, gold, black, white

Personnel
- Owner: Beverly Olson
- Head coach: Kevin Porter (2001–2003); Mike Hold (2002–2005); Derek Stingley (2006–2007)

Team history
- Macon Knights (2001–2006)

Home fields
- Macon Coliseum (2001–2007)

League / conference affiliations
- af2 (2001–2006): American Conference (2001–2006); Southeastern Division (2001); Eastern Division (2002); Southern Division (2003–2006)

Championships
- Conference championships: 1: 2003
- Division championships: 1: 2002

Playoff appearances (4)
- 2001, 2002, 2003, 2005

The Macon Knights were a professional arena football team, playing in the af2 league. They were a 2001 expansion member of af2. They played their home games at Macon Coliseum. The Knights were owned and operated by Beverly Olson. The Knights were formerly coached by Derek Stingley, who was a Defensive Specialist with the Albany Firebirds in the original Arena Football League. And he also is the son of former New England Patriots' wide receiver Darryl Stingley.

== History ==
The franchise was created in 2001, the second year of the af2. Olson's first successful move as owner operator was to bring in local football star Kevin Porter to coach the upstart team. Porter, an alumnus of Auburn University, and the Kansas City Chiefs was also an arena football veteran. Under his leadership, the inaugural team made the playoffs and was named "Expansion Franchise of the Year" by the league. He went on to coach the New Orleans VooDoo and Kansas City Brigade of the AFL.

Two seasons later, Porter led the Knights to the ArenaCup, af2's championship game, where the Knights lost to the Tulsa Talons 58–40. Afterwards, he left for the parent AFL and a number of his players followed.

Porter was replaced by AFL veteran Mike Hold. Despite his success with other franchises, Hold did not have as good a fortune in Macon. In 2005, after a bad start, Hold was replaced by Derek Stingley.

Stingley took a club that had fallen to 2–5 and, by season's end, managed to get them into the playoffs. The Knights however, lost to the Louisville Fire in the opening round.

After the 2006 season, the team announced they would be shutting down operations. However, on October 10, 2008, the Macon Telegraph reported that an investor is "deeply interested" in relaunching the Knights franchise in Macon, as early as 2009, but no later than 2010.

== Head coaches ==
Note: Statistics are correct through the end of the 2006 af2 season.

Name	Term	Regular season				Playoffs		Awards
Name	Term	W	L	T	Win%	W	L	Awards
Kevin Porter	2001-2003	33	15	0	.688	4	3	
Mike Hold	2004-2005	5	18	0	.217	0	0	
Derek Stingley	2005-2006	14	11	0	.560	0	1	

== Statistics and records ==
=== Season-by-season results ===
Note: The finish, wins, losses, and ties columns list regular season results and exclude any postseason play.

League champions	Conference champions	Division champions	Wild card berth	League leader

Season	Team	League	Conference	Division	Regular season				Postseason results
Season	Team	League	Conference	Division	Finish	Wins	Losses	Ties	Postseason results
2001	2001	af2	American	Southeastern	2nd	10	6	0	Lost Round 1 (Quad City) 55-80
2002	2002	af2	American	Eastern	1st	13	3	0	Won Round 1 (Augusta) 57-41; Lost AC Semifinals (Florida) 28-44
2003	2003	af2	American	Southern	3rd	10	6	0	Won Wild card (Florida) 42-16; Won AC Semifinals (Albany) 59-47; Won AC Championship (Tennessee Valley) 51-48; Lost ArenaCup IV (Tulsa) 40-58
2004	2004	af2	American	Southern	4th	3	13	0	
2005	2005	af2	American	Southern	2nd	8	8	0	Lost Wild card (Louisville) 54-55
2006	2006	af2	American	Southern	3rd	8	8	0	
Totals						52	44	0	All-time regular season record (2001–2006)
Totals						4	4	-	All-time postseason record (2001–2006)
Totals						56	48	0	All-time regular season and postseason record (2001–2006)
