= 2003 AF2 season =

- League: AF2
- Sport: Arena football

Regular season
- Season champions: Quad City Steamwheelers

Playoffs
- American champions: Macon Knights
- American runners-up: Tennessee Valley Vipers
- National champions: Tulsa Talons
- National runners-up: Arkansas Twisters

ArenaCup IV
- Champions: Tulsa Talons
- Runners-up: Macon Knights

AF2 seasons
- ← 2002 2004 →

The 2003 AF2 season was the fourth season of the AF2. It was preceded by 2002 and succeeded by 2004. The league champions were the Tulsa Talons, who defeated the Macon Knights in ArenaCup IV. For the first time ever, AF2 uses the six-division alignment (three divisions per conference).

== League info ==
New teams	Cincinnati Swarm, Green Bay Blizzard
Renamed / Relocated teams	None
Defunct teams	Augusta Stallions, Carolina Rhinos, Fresno Frenzy, Jacksonville Tomcats, Mobile Wizards, New Haven Ninjas, Pensacola Barracudas, Roanoke Steam, Tallahassee Thunder
Total teams	27

== Standings ==
Team	Overall				Division		
Team	Wins	Losses	Ties	Percentage	Wins	Losses	Percentage
American Conference
Atlantic Division
Cape Fear Wildcats	10	6	0	0.625	5	3	0.625
Greensboro Prowlers	9	7	0	0.562	6	2	0.750
Charleston Swamp Foxes	9	7	0	0.562	4	4	0.500
Norfolk Nighthawks	8	8	0	0.500	2	6	0.250
Richmond Speed	6	10	0	0.375	3	5	0.375
Northeast Division
Albany Conquest	13	3	0	0.812	7	2	0.778
Mohegan Wolves	10	6	0	0.625	6	3	0.667
Wilkes-Barre/Scranton Pioneers	6	10	0	0.375	3	6	0.333
Rochester Brigade	3	13	0	0.187	2	7	0.222
Southern Division
Tennessee Valley Vipers	14	2	0	0.875	7	1	0.875
Florida Firecats	10	6	0	0.625	5	3	0.625
Macon Knights	10	6	0	0.625	4	4	0.500
Birmingham Steeldogs	7	9	0	0.437	3	5	0.375
Columbus Wardogs	4	12	0	0.250	1	7	0.125
National Conference
Central Division
Tulsa Talons	13	3	0	0.812	5	1	0.833
Arkansas Twisters	9	7	0	0.562	5	1	0.833
Memphis Xplorers	6	10	0	0.375	2	4	0.333
Bossier City Battle Wings	3	13	0	0.187	0	6	0.000
Midwest Division
Quad City Steamwheelers	14	2	0	0.875	8	0	1.000
Cincinnati Swarm	7	9	0	0.437	4	4	0.500
Louisville Fire	5	11	0	0.312	4	4	0.500
Peoria Pirates	5	11	0	0.312	3	5	0.375
Green Bay Blizzard	2	14	0	0.125	1	7	0.125
Western Division
Hawaiian Islanders	10	6	0	0.625	5	3	0.625
Bakersfield Blitz	8	7	1	0.531	4	3	0.571
Wichita Stealth	8	7	1	0.531	2	3	0.400
San Diego Riptide	6	10	0	0.375	3	5	0.375

- Green indicates clinched playoff berth
- Purple indicates division champion
- Grey indicates best regular season record

== Playoffs ==
Macon, Georgia	Albany, New York
5	Florida	35
4	Macon	59
4	Macon	42	Huntsville, Alabama
2	Albany	47
American Conference
Fayetteville, North Carolina	4	Macon	51
Huntsville, Alabama
1	Tennessee Valley	48
6	Mohegan	50	American Conference Championship
6	Mohegan	30
3	Cape Fear	47	Tulsa, Oklahoma
1	Tennessee Valley	47
Wild Card Round
Conference Semifinals
North Little Rock, Arkansas	A4	Macon	40
Moline, Illinois
N2	Tulsa	58
5	Bakersfield	28	ArenaCup IV
4	Arkansas	63
4	Arkansas	36	Tulsa, Oklahoma
1	Quad Cities	61
National Conference
Honolulu	4	Arkansas	52
Tulsa, Oklahoma
2	Tulsa	63
6	Wichita	30	National Conference Championship
3	Hawaii	38
3	Hawaii	57
2	Tulsa	58

== ArenaCup IV ==
ArenaCup IV

Quarter	1	2	3	4	Tot
Tulsa Talons	14	21	3	20	58
Macon Knights	7	0	13	20	40

Date
August 23, 2003
Arena
Tulsa Convention Center
City
Tulsa, Oklahoma
Attendance
7,184
Most Valuable Player
Craig Strickland
Offensive Player of the Game

Defensive Player of the Game
Larry Hollinquest
Ironman of the Game
Mitch Allner
Winning Coach
Skip Foster
Losing Coach
Kevin Porter

ArenaCup IV was the 2003 edition of the AF2's championship game, in which the National Conference Champions Tulsa Talons defeated the American Conference Champions Macon Knights in Tulsa, Oklahoma by a score of 58 to 40.

=== Scoring Summary ===
Scoring summary

Quarter	Time	Drive			Team	Scoring information	Score	
Quarter	Time	Plays	Yards	TOP	Team	Scoring information	Macon Knights	Tulsa Talons
1	12:33	4	48	2:27	Tulsa Talons	Tacoma Fontaine 29-yard touchdown reception from Craig Strickland, Tony Dodson kick Good	0	7
1	8:32	3	36	4:01	Macon Knights	Tremaine Neal 14-yard touchdown reception from Jermain Alfred, Wesley Wilson kick Good	7	7
1	3:11	7	46	5:21	Tulsa Talons	Mitch Allner 13-yard touchdown reception from Craig Strickland, Tony Dodson kick Good	7	14
2	13:18	3	15	1:37	Tulsa Talons	Craig Strickland 6-yard touchdown run, Tony Dodson kick Good	7	21
2	0:56	8	40	4:44	Tulsa Talons	Aleric Clark 1-yard touchdown run, Tony Dodson kick Good	7	28
2	0:01	3	28	0:14	Tulsa Talons	Aleric Clark 2-yard touchdown reception from Craig Strickland, Tony Dodson kick Good	7	35
3	13:52	2	49	1:08	Macon Knights	Anthony Snead 39-yard touchdown reception from Jermain Alfred, Wesley Wilson kick Good	14	35
3	9:05	5	22	4:47	Tulsa Talons	26-yard field goal by Tony Dodson	14	38
3	2:28	10	48	6:37	Macon Knights	Jermain Alfred 4-yard touchdown run, Wesley Wilson kick Failed	20	38
4	10:26	5	43	3:47	Macon Knights	Jermain Alfred 2-yard touchdown run, 2-point Randyn Akoina failed	26	38
4	7:31	3	30	2:55	Tulsa Talons	Tacoma Fontaine 20-yard touchdown reception from Craig Strickland, Tony Dodson kick Failed	26	44
4	4:44	3	15	2:47	Macon Knights	Randyn Akoina 15-yard touchdown reception from Jermain Alfred, 2-point Jermain Alfred Pass failed	32	44
4	2:00	3	17	2:44	Tulsa Talons	Mitch Allner 15-yard touchdown reception from Craig Strickland, Tony Dodson kick Good	32	51
4	0:38	3	34	1:22	Macon Knights	Randyn Akoina 8-yard touchdown reception from Jermain Alfred, 2-point Evan Marios Rush from Jermain Alfred succeeded	40	51
4	0:08	4	3	0:30	Tulsa Talons	Craig Strickland 3-yard touchdown run, Tony Dodson kick Good	40	58
"TOP" = time of possession. For other American football terms, see Glossary of American football.							Macon Knights	Tulsa Talons
