= Manchester Wolves =

Arena football team

- Founded: 2001
- Folded: 2009
- Team history: Mohegan Wolves (2002–2003); Manchester Wolves (2004–2009)
- Based in: Verizon Wireless Arena in Manchester, New Hampshire
- Home arenas: Mohegan Sun Arena (2002–2003); Verizon Wireless Arena (2004–2009)
- League: AF2 (2002–2009): American Conference (2002–2009); Northeastern Division (2002–2004); Eastern Division (2005–2006); East Division (2007–2009)
- Colors: Royal, silver, black, white

Personnel
- Head coach: Danton Barto
- Owner: Big Win Ventures LLC

Championships
- Division titles (1): 2005

Playoff appearances (6)
- 2003, 2005, 2006, 2007, 2008, 2009

The Manchester Wolves were a professional arena football team, based at the Verizon Wireless Arena in Manchester, New Hampshire, which folded at the end of the 2009 season along with the rest of the league. They played in the East Division of the American Conference of the AF2 league, which was the minor league of the Arena Football League.

== Team history ==
=== Inception ===
On July 19, 2001, Uncasville, Connecticut was awarded an AF2 expansion team. On December 12, 2001, Mohegan Sun and Dr. Eric Margenau, President/Chief Executive Officer of United Sports Ventures, announced that the new expansion AF2 franchise would be named the Mohegan Wolves. Margenau introduced Gary Porter, as the head coach for the team that would first take the field April 5, 2002 at the Mohegan Sun Arena against the Albany Conquest. Gary Porter, previously led the expansion Peoria Pirates to a 7–9 record in 2001.

The team name was selected through a "Name the Team" contest sponsored by WCTY, Mohegan Sun and X-Tra Mart. A Jewett City, Connecticut resident, came up with the winning name. The winner won four season tickets for the 2002 Mohegan Wolves season, dinner for four on the night of the team's first home game, and a team merchandise package.

=== New owners ===
On February 6, 2003, the AF2 league office announced that Big Win Ventures LLC would now be the operator of the Mohegan Wolves. Dr. Margenau, the former principal operator of the Mohegan Wolves, assumed the role of President of Big Win and remained a substantial shareholder. Big Win, which is privately held, also announced the same day that it has assumed operations of the Albany Conquest AF2 franchise.

For the 2003 season, AFL veteran head coach Mark Stoute led the Wolves and dramatically improved their record. The team finished with a 10–6 regular season record (which included a 7–1 home record) and won their first postseason game on August 2, 2003 against the Atlantic Division Champion Cape Fear Wildcats 50–47. The season ended the next week on August 8, 2003 with a 47–30 loss to the Tennessee Valley Vipers.

=== Relocation ===
On October 29, 2003, the league office approved the relocation of the Mohegan Wolves team to Manchester, New Hampshire. The Wolves’ move to Manchester was made possible through the efforts of a group of local businessmen and Dr. Margenau. The team of local investors was led by longtime area resident Steve Schubert, a former player for the New England Patriots and Chicago Bears.

During the first season in Manchester, New Hampshire, the new head coach, Rik Richards, was first fired midway through the season and replaced by his coordinator Ron Hill. And assistant coaches Mark Page and Ryan Ray. The Wolves finished out the season with a 5–11 record.

=== New coach/Turnaround ===
Things turned around in 2005 with new head coach, Ben Bennett. Bennett, a veteran coach and player with Arena Football and AF2 transformed the Manchester team to a 12–4 regular season record and won the East Division. The regular season included a 10-game win streak. The season ended with a first round playoff loss at home on August 12, 2005 against the Louisville Fire 56–69.

=== Quarterback problems ===
In 2006, the Wolves had loftier expectations because of many key players and Head Coach Ben Bennett returning. The team had issues at Quarterback however as D. Bryant and Kyle Rowley were ineffective while trying to fill the shoes of the 2005 starter and current Jake Eaton. With four games remaining in the season and the team sitting at 5–7, Coach Bennett turned to former Ohio State Quarterback Steve Bellisari. A failed defensive back in the NFL, Bellisari took over of the Wolves offense and led them to four straight victories which took the Wolves from the bottom of the division to making the playoffs and hosting a first-round game.

Bellisari found his favorite target Steve Gonzalez and the Wolves had a defense with the tandem of William Haith and Allistair Sebastien as the Wolves got a 55–47 win against the Wilkes-Barre/Scranton Pioneers in front of 3,732 fans at Verizon Wireless Arena. The Wolves season would end one week later in Florida however as Steve Bellisari was driving the Wolves down the field late in the fourth quarter when he threw his last pass as a Wolf, a game-sealing interception to the Florida Firecats. The final score was Florida 40, Manchester 39.

=== Sponsors ===
In 2007 HAVOC announced a partnership with the Wolves as well as other AFL teams.

== Season-by-season ==
Season records
Season	W	L	T	Finish	Playoff results
Mohegan Wolves
2002	3	13	0	5th AC Northeast	–
2003	10	6	0	2nd AC Northeast	Won AC Round 1 (Cape Fear 50–47); Lost AC Semifinal (Tennessee Valley 47–30)
Manchester Wolves
2004	5	11	0	4th AC Northeast	–
2005	12	4	0	1st AC East	Lost AC Semifinal (Louisville 69–56)
2006	9	7	0	2nd AC East	Won AC Round 1 (Wilkes-Barre/Scranton 55–47); Lost AC Semifinal (Florida 40–39)
2007	10	6	0	2nd AC East	Lost AC Round 1 (Central Valley 42–41)
2008	9	7	0	2nd AC East	Won AC Round 1 (South Georgia 46–42); Won AC Semifinal (Green Bay 55–54); Lost AC Championship (Tennessee Valley 45–35)
2009	7	9	0	2nd AC East	Lost AC Round 1 (Iowa 70–53)
Totals	65	61	0	(including playoffs)	

== Notable players ==
- Steve Bellisari – QB/S
- D. Bryant – QB
- Steve Gonzalez – WR
- Mike Potts – QB
- Rich Ranglin – OL
- Kyle Rowley – QB
- Liam Coen – QB

== See also ==
- Category:Manchester Wolves players
