= 2006 AF2 season =

- League: AF2
- Sport: Arena football

Regular season
- Season champions: Spokane Shock

Playoffs
- American champions: Green Bay Blizzard
- American runners-up: Florida Firecats
- National champions: Spokane Shock
- National runners-up: Arkansas Twisters

ArenaCup VII
- Champions: Spokane Shock
- Runners-up: Green Bay Blizzard
- Finals MVP: Kyle Rowley (QB, SPO)

AF2 seasons
- ← 2005 2007 →

The 2006 AF2 season was the seventh season of the AF2, the Arena Football League's minor league. It was preceded by 2005 and succeeded by 2007. The league champions were the Spokane Shock who capped off an impressive inaugural season with a win over the Green Bay Blizzard in ArenaCup VII.

== League info ==
New teams	Everett Hawks, Spokane Shock, Stockton Lightning, Tennessee Valley Vipers
Renamed / Relocated teams	None
Defunct teams	San Diego Riptide
Total teams	23

== Standings ==
Team	Overall			Division		
Team	Wins	Losses	Percentage	Wins	Losses	Percentage
American Conference
Eastern Division
Green Bay Blizzard	10	6	0.625	6	4	0.600
Manchester Wolves	9	7	0.562	7	5	0.583
Wilkes-Barre/Scranton Pioneers	9	7	0.562	7	5	0.583
Louisville Fire	9	7	0.562	5	5	0.500
Quad City Steamwheelers	7	9	0.437	4	6	0.400
Albany Conquest	5	11	0.312	4	8	0.333
Southern Division
Florida Firecats	13	3	0.812	9	1	0.900
Memphis Xplorers	11	5	0.687	6	4	0.600
Macon Knights	8	8	0.500	6	4	0.600
Birmingham Steeldogs	7	9	0.437	4	6	0.400
Tennessee Valley Vipers	3	13	0.187	3	7	0.300
South Georgia Wildcats	3	13	0.187	2	8	0.200
National Conference
Midwest Division
Tulsa Talons	11	5	0.687	7	4	0.634
Oklahoma City Yard Dawgz	11	5	0.687	7	4	0.634
Arkansas Twisters	10	6	0.625	6	4	0.600
Rio Grande Valley Dorados	7	9	0.437	5	5	0.500
Amarillo Dusters	4	12	0.250	4	6	0.400
Bossier-Shreveport Battle Wings	3	13	0.187	2	8	0.200
Western Division
Spokane Shock	14	2	0.875	8	1	0.889
Central Valley Coyotes	12	4	0.750	8	3	0.728
Bakersfield Blitz	9	7	0.562	6	5	0.545
Stockton Lightning	5	11	0.312	2	9	0.189
Everett Hawks	4	12	0.250	3	9	0.250

- Green indicates clinched playoff berth
- Purple indicates division champion
- Grey indicates best regular season record

== Playoffs ==
Southaven, Mississippi	Ashwaubenon, Wisconsin
6	Louisville	61
3	Memphis	50
3	Memphis	83	Estero, Florida
2	Green Bay	67
American Conference
Manchester, New Hampshire	2	Green Bay	60
Estero, Florida
1	Florida	47
5	Wilkes-Barre/Scranton	47	American Conference Championship
4	Manchester	39
4	Manchester	55	San Juan, PR
1	Florida	40
Round 1
Conference Semifinals
Oklahoma City	A2	Green Bay	34
Tulsa, Oklahoma
N1	Spokane	57
5	Arkansas	47	ArenaCup VII
5	Arkansas	53
4	Oklahoma City	43	Spokane, Washington
2	Tulsa	51
National Conference
Fresno, California	5	Arkansas	30
Spokane, Washington
1	Spokane	48
6	Bakersfield	45	National Conference Championship
6	Bakersfield	47
3	Central Valley	37
1	Spokane	50

== ArenaCup VII ==
ArenaCup VII
Spokane Shock	Green Bay Blizzard
57	34
Head coach: Chris Siegfried	Head coach: Bob Landsee
	1	2	3	4	Total
Spokane	7	34	6	10	57
Green Bay	7	7	14	6	34
- Date: August 26, 2006
- Arena: Coliseo de Puerto Rico José Miguel Agrelot; San Juan, Puerto Rico
- MVP: Kyle Rowley, QB-Spokane (Offensive); Neil Purvis, OL/DL-Spokane (Defensive); Kevin Beard, WR/DB-Spokane (Ironman)
- Attendance: 5,658

ArenaCup VII was the 2006 edition of the AF2's championship game, pairing the Green Bay Blizzard of the American Conference with the Spokane Shock of the National Conference. The Shock rode the arm of Offensive Player of the Game Kyle Rowley and a stout defense to a decisive victory over the Blizzard 57–34. The win by the Shock capped a wildly successful inaugural season that saw them go 14–2 in the regular season and become the first-ever AF2 expansion team to advance to and win the ArenaCup in their first year of existence.

=== Scoring Summary ===
Scoring summary

Quarter	Time	Drive			Team	Scoring information	Score	
Quarter	Time	Plays	Yards	TOP	Team	Scoring information	Spokane Shock	Green Bay Blizard
1	11:00	6	45	4:00	Spokane Shock	Charles Frederick 16-yard touchdown reception from Kyle Rowley, Jon Koker kick Good	7	0
1	8:10	4	38	2:50	Green Bay Blizzard	Luke Leverson 2-yard touchdown run, Dallas Pelz kick Good	7	7
2	14:55	10	44	8:15	Spokane Shock	Moa Peaua 1-yard touchdown run, Jon Koker kick Good	14	7
2	5:58	6	49	4:26	Spokane Shock	Antwone Savage 9-yard touchdown reception from Kyle Rowley, Jon Koker kick Good	21	7
2	3:24	3	45	2:34	Green Bay Blizzard	Dontrell Jackson 14-yard touchdown reception from James MacPherson, Dallas Pelz kick Good	21	14
2	1:32	2	27	1:52	Spokane Shock	Kevin Beard 20-yard touchdown reception from Kyle Rowley, Jon Koker kick Good	28	14
2	0:19	3	37	1:13	Spokane Shock	Antwone Savage 10-yard touchdown reception from Kyle Rowley, Jon Koker kick Failed	34	14
2	0:12				Spokane Shock	Fumble recovery in the End Zone by Neil Purvis, Jon Koker Kick Good	41	14
3	13:49	2	44	1:11	Green Bay Blizzard	Gerald Harris 31-yard touchdown reception from James MacPherson, 2-point James MacPherson pass failed	41	20
3	8:35	6	44	5:14	Green Bay Blizzard	Peter Lazare 2-yard touchdown run, 2-point Brent Holmes Pass from James MacPherson Successful	41	28
3	5:00	4	8	3:35	Spokane Shock	Kevin Beard 1-yard touchdown reception from Kyle Rowley, Jon Koker kick Failed	47	28
4	11:08	7	45	4:37	Spokane Shock	Chauncey Ako 8-yard touchdown reception from Kyle Rowley, Jon Koker kick Good	54	28
4	8:10	4	29	2:58	Green Bay Blizzard	Asa Francis 6-yard touchdown run, 2-point Luke Leverson rush Failed	54	34
4	5:32	4	2	2:38	Spokane Shock	23-yard field goal by Jon Koker	57	34
"TOP" = time of possession. For other American football terms, see Glossary of American football.							Spokane Shock	Green Bay Blizzard

=== Game stats/notes ===
- Rowley completed 29-of-36 passes for 264 yards and six touchdowns, all of which were game-highs.
- Shock DS Rob Keefe was awarded the Cutters Catch of the Game as a result of his one-handed interception off a James MacPherson pass attempt deep in Spokane territory.
- Shock WR/DB Kevin Beard set game-highs in receiving with 13 receptions for 122 yards and two touchdowns.
- Shock head coach Chris Siegfried earned his 57th win as an AF2 head coach with the ArenaCup victory, the most in league history at the time. His record was eventually tied in week 17 of the 2007 season, and broken in the first round of the 2007 playoffs by Wilkes-Barre/Scranton Pioneers coach Rich Ingold.
- The Shock capped off their inaugural season with a 17-2 overall record.
- Green Bay finished the 2006 season with a 12-7 overall record and the team's first-ever American Conference Championship.
