= 2005 AF2 season =

- League: AF2
- Sport: Arena football

Regular season
- Season champions: Florida Firecats

Playoffs
- American champions: Louisville Fire
- American runners-up: Florida Firecats
- National champions: Memphis Xplorers
- National runners-up: Rio Grande Valley Dorados

ArenaCup VI
- Champions: Memphis Xplorers
- Runners-up: Louisville Fire

AF2 seasons
- ← 2004 2006 →

The 2005 AF2 season was the sixth season of the AF2. It was preceded by 2004 and succeeded by 2006. The league champions were the Memphis Xplorers, who defeated the Louisville Fire in ArenaCup VI.

== League info ==
New teams	Amarillo Dusters
Renamed / Relocated teams	Cape Fear Wildcats → South Georgia Wildcats
Defunct teams	Columbus Wardogs, Hawaiian Islanders, Laredo Law, Peoria Pirates, Tennessee Valley Vipers, Wichita Stealth
Total teams	20

== Standings ==
Team	Overall			Division		
Team	Wins	Losses	Percentage	Wins	Losses	Percentage
American Conference
Eastern Division
Manchester Wolves	12	4	0.750	8	1	0.889
Louisville Fire	11	5	0.687	4	3	0.571
Green Bay Blizzard	9	7	0.562	4	4	0.500
Wilkes-Barre/Scranton Pioneers	9	7	0.562	4	4	0.500
Albany Conquest	4	12	0.250	1	9	0.100
Southern Division
Florida Firecats	14	2	0.875	8	0	1.000
Macon Knights	8	8	0.500	6	2	0.750
Arkansas Twisters	5	11	0.312	3	5	0.375
South Georgia Wildcats	3	13	0.187	2	6	0.250
Birmingham Steeldogs	2	14	0.125	1	7	0.125
National Conference
Midwest Division
Memphis Xplorers	13	3	0.812	6	2	0.750
Oklahoma City Yard Dawgz	10	6	0.625	5	3	0.625
Quad City Steamwheelers	9	7	0.562	5	3	0.625
Amarillo Dusters	8	8	0.500	3	5	0.375
Bossier-Shreveport Battle Wings	3	13	0.187	1	7	0.125
Western Division
Tulsa Talons	11	5	0.687	6	2	0.750
Rio Grande Valley Dorados	10	6	0.625	7	1	0.875
Central Valley Coyotes	8	8	0.500	7	5	0.583
Bakersfield Blitz	6	10	0.375	3	9	0.250
San Diego Riptide	5	11	0.312	3	9	0.250

- Green indicates clinched playoff berth
- Purple indicates division champion
- Grey indicates best regular season record

== Playoffs ==
Louisville, Kentucky	Manchester, New Hampshire
6	Macon	54
3	Louisville	69
3	Louisville	55	Estero, Florida
2	Manchester	56
American Conference
Ashwaubenon, Wisconsin	3	Louisville	70
Estero, Florida
1	Florida	40
5	Wilkes-Barre/Scranton	48	American Conference Championship
5	Wilkes-Barre/Scranton	45
4	Green Bay	41	Bossier City, Louisiana
1	Florida	59
Wild Card Round
Conference Semifinals
Hidalgo, Texas	A3	Louisville	41
Tulsa, Oklahoma
N1	Memphis	63
5	Quad Cities	38	ArenaCup VI
4	Rio Grande Valley	65
4	Rio Grande Valley	56	Southaven, Mississippi
2	Tulsa	42
National Conference
Oklahoma City	4	Rio Grande Valley	49
Southaven, Mississippi
1	Memphis	58
6	Amarillo	59	National Conference Championship
6	Amarillo	30
3	Oklahoma City	56
1	Memphis	71

== ArenaCup VI ==
VI

Quarter	1	2	3	4	Tot
Louisville Fire	14	7	0	20	41
Memphis Xplorers	13	14	9	27	63

Date
August 27, 2005
Arena
CenturyTel Center
City
Bossier City, Louisiana
Attendance
6,236
Offensive Player of the Game
Kevin Prentiss
Defensive Player of the Game
Terrance Quattlebaum
Ironman of the Game
Terrance Quattlebaum
Winning coach
Danton Barto
Losing coach
Tommy Johnson

ArenaCup VI was the 2005 edition of the AF2's championship game, in which the National Conference Champions Memphis Xplorers defeated the American Conference Champions Louisville Fire in Bossier City, Louisiana by a score of 63 to 41.

=== Scoring Summary ===
Scoring summary

Quarter	Time	Drive			Team	Scoring information	Score	
Quarter	Time	Plays	Yards	TOP	Team	Scoring information	Louisville Fire	Memphis Xplorers
1	11:15				Louisville Fire	Cesare Manning 4-yard touchdown reception from Matt Sauk, Danny Kight kick Good	7	0
1	9:24				Memphis Xplorers	Kevin Prentiss 31-yard touchdown reception from Brian Jones, Steven Azar kick Failed	7	6
1	7:43				Louisville Fire	Rob Mager 19-yard touchdown reception from Matt Sauk, Danny Kight kick Good	14	6
1	3:09				Memphis Xplorers	Kevin Prentiss 9-yard touchdown reception from Brian Jones, Steven Azar kick Good	14	13
2	12:45				Louisville Fire	Demetrius Forney 1-yard touchdown run, Danny Kight kick Good	21	13
2	6:30				Memphis Xplorers	Kevin Prentiss 9-yard touchdown reception from Brian Jones, Steven Azar kick Good	21	20
2	2:57	-	-	-	Memphis Xplorers	Interception returned 29 yards for touchdown by Scott Cunningham, Steven Azar kick Good	21	27
3	9:21				Memphis Xplorers	Brian Jones 1-yard touchdown run, Steven Azar kick Failed	21	33
3	1:53				Memphis Xplorers	28-yard field goal by Steven Azar	21	36
4	12:18				Memphis Xplorers	Terrance Quattlebaum 9-yard touchdown reception from Brian Jones, Steven Azar kick Good	21	43
4	9:20				Louisville Fire	Rob Mager 15-yard touchdown reception from Matt Sauk, Danny Kight kick Good	28	43
4					Memphis Xplorers	Terrell Adams 7-yard touchdown run, Steven Azar kick Blocked	28	49
4	6:29				Memphis Xplorers	Interception returned 15 yards for touchdown by Dahnel Singfield, Steven Azar kick Good	28	56
4	4:02				Louisville Fire	Rob Mager 15-yard touchdown reception from Matt Sauk, Danny Kight kick Good	35	56
4	1:38				Memphis Xplorers	Kevin Prentiss 13-yard touchdown reception from Brian Jones, Steven Azar kick Good	35	63
4	0:00				Louisville Fire	Michael Larkin 14-yard touchdown reception from Matt Sauk, NA kick No Kick Attempted	41	63
"TOP" = time of possession. For other American football terms, see Glossary of American football.							Louisville Fire	Memphis Xplorers
