= Green Bay Blizzard =

American indoor football team

- Current season
- Logo
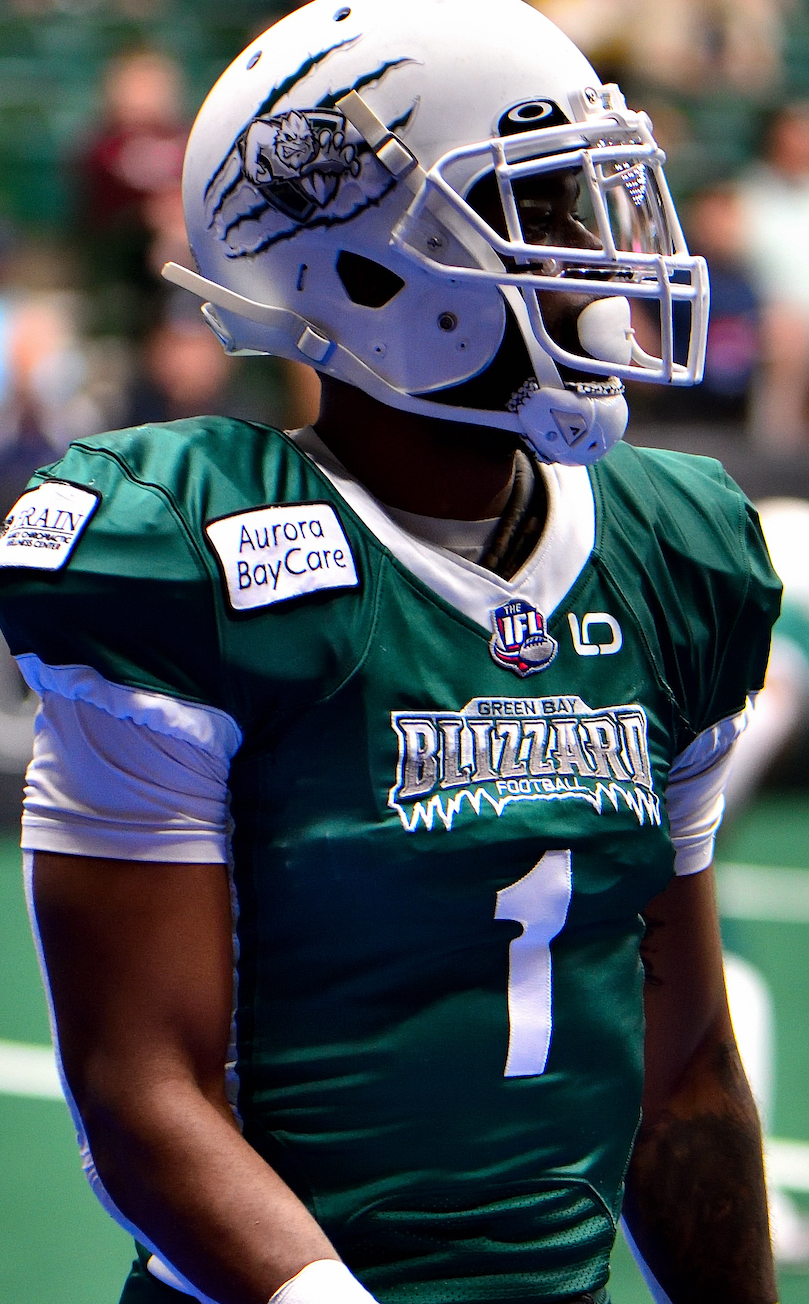
- Uniforms

General information
- Founded: 2003
- Headquartered: Resch Center in Green Bay, Wisconsin
- Colors: Forest green, white, silver
- Mascot: Bruiser the Yeti, Blizz and Bling – Bruiser's Yeti Cousins
- Website: greenbayblizzard.com

Personnel
- Owners: Larry & Kathy Treankler
- General manager: Levi Nelson
- Head coach: Levi Nelson

Team history
- Green Bay Blizzard (2003–present)

Home fields
- Resch Center (2003–present)

League / conference affiliations
- AF2 (2003–2009): National Conference (2003–2004); Midwestern (2003–2004); American Conference (2005–2009); Eastern (2005–2006); Midwest (2007–2009); Indoor Football League (2010–present): United Conference (2010–2017); Central North (2010); Great Lakes (2011); Eastern Conference (2022–present)

Championships
- Conference championships: 3: af2 American: 2006; IFL Eastern Conference: 2025, 2026
- Division championships: 6: af2 Eastern: 2006; af2 Midwest: 2008; IFL Central North: 2010; IFL Great Lakes: 2011; IFL Eastern: 2024, 2026

Playoff appearances (12)
- af2: 2005, 2006, 2007, 2008, 2009; IFL: 2010, 2011, 2012, 2019, 2024, 2025, 2026

The Green Bay Blizzard are a professional indoor football team based in the Green Bay metropolitan area that competes in the Indoor Football League (IFL). The franchise was founded in 2003. The Blizzard began play in the IFL in 2010, after having played the previous seven seasons in af2, the now-defunct minor league of the Arena Football League. They play their home games at the Resch Center. The team's logo represents Bruiser, the team mascot.

== History ==
=== af2: 2003–2009 ===
The Blizzard started out as an AF2 expansion team in 2003 with Jose Jefferson as the team's head coach. The team finished 2–14, last in the National Conference Midwest Division. They only averaged 2,957 fans a game.

At the beginning of the 2004 season, the Blizzard replaced Jose Jefferson with former Green Bay Packers linebacker Brian Noble. Despite the team improving during the 2004 season, the Blizzard finished 6–10.

In 2005, the team moved from the National Conference to the American Conference of AF2. The Blizzard became a member of the American Conference's East division. The team also replaced Noble with veteran Arena Football League Bob Landsee. The team continued their trend of improvement in 2005 finishing 9–7, good for 3rd in the East Division, and reaching the postseason for the first time. They fell in the first round to the Wilkes-Barre/Scranton Pioneers.

Blizzard head coach Bob Landsee became the first coach in team history to return for their second season. The Blizzard also came under new ownership as former coach Brian Noble lead an investment group that purchased the team. Noble became the new president of the four-year-old franchise and began a complete revitalization of the organization, drastically lowering ticket prices in an attempt to boost their average game attendance. The team set a new single game attendance record of 7,184 in the season finale against Louisville. The team experienced an improvement on the field as well, going into the final game of the 2006 regular season tied with the Louisville Fire for first in the East Division at 9–6. This set up a showdown between the two teams at the Resch Center for the East Division title, which the Blizzard won 54–53. The Blizzard earned a first round bye before facing the 2005 ArenaCup Champion Memphis Xplorers in the Blizzard's inaugural home playoff game, which they won 67–50. This victory sent them to the American Conference Championship Game against the Florida Firecats, which they won 60–47, capturing the conference title and advancing to ArenaCup VII, where they lost to the Spokane Shock 54–37.

Coach Bob Landsee had difficulties resulting from surgery and was forced to take a leave of absence for the 2007 season. He was replaced by defensive coordinator Doug Lytle, who led the Blizzard to a 9–7 season, remaining undefeated at home yet losing all but one road game. The Blizzard made the playoffs for the third consecutive year and surprised their rival and Midwest Division Champion Quad City Steamwheelers 39–34 in the first-round game. The Blizzard carried over their success at home from the regular season by defeating Louisville in the second round 37–27, but lost to Wilkes-Barre/Scranton in their second consecutive American Conference championship game, 46–43.

Head coach Bob Landsee returned in 2008 and led the Blizzard to an 11–5 record and a Midwest Division title. The Blizzard set a single-game record for attendance against Lexington with 7,258 and had the largest average attendance in team history with an average of 6,125 fans per game. In the first round of the playoffs the Blizzard defeated Lexington 65–37 after having lost twice to them in the regular season. The Blizzard then hosted Manchester in a second-round game, losing 55–54 on a last minute Manchester two-point conversion.

After beginning the season by defeating the defending ArenaCup Champion Tennessee Valley Vipers. The Blizzard failed to capture a consecutive Midwest Division title and finished the season 10–6, earning the #6 seed in the 2009 af2 playoffs. The Blizzard advanced to their third American Conference Championship, losing to #1 seed Wilkes-Barre/Scranton 72–67.

=== Indoor Football League: 2010–present ===
In October 2009, the team announced that unless the team found additional investors that they would be forced to cease operations. The Blizzard found new investors in an ownership group named Titletown Football Group, LLC, led by Green Bay Bullfrogs president Jeff Royle, who purchased the team in late October. In November 2009, the team announced that they would play the 2010 season in the Indoor Football League (IFL) due to AF2 filing for bankruptcy. At a team open house on November 17, 2009, the Blizzard announced their new head coach would be Rik Richards.

On December 5, 2009, the Blizzard announced a name-the-team contest. The Blizzard name and intellectual property was held by the then-defunct Arena Football League (AFL), which was the parent of the Blizzard's former league, AF2. The assets of the former AFL were purchased by the newly formed Arena Football 1. The team ownership group was still attempting to purchase the rights to the Blizzard name and had decided to continue with the contest in case the Blizzard name was not able to be purchased, but the owners were able to acquire the Blizzard name and imagery.

==== Early success ====
On December 15, 2009, the IFL announced the divisional alignment and schedule for the 2010 season. The Blizzard competed in the United Conference, Central North Division with the La Crosse Spartans, Chicago Slaughter and Bloomington Extreme. The Blizzard won the Central North Division, but lost their first round playoff game against the Chicago Slaughter.

For the 2011 season, the Blizzard competed in the United Conference, Great Lakes Division, which was a renamed Central North Division (the Spartans, Slaughter, and Extreme, along with the Blizzard). The Blizzard won the division title again and improved to 11–3 record. They defeated the Reading Express in their first round playoff game, but lost the United Conference Championship game to the eventual champions, the Sioux Falls Storm.

Because of various teams leaving the IFL, either to join other leagues or cease operations altogether, the league played the 2012 season format in two conferences with no divisions. While the Spartans had ceased operations, the Blizzard's divisional rivals, the Slaughter and the newly renamed Bloomington Edge joined in the single-table United Conference along with the Reading Express, Sioux Falls Storm, Cedar Rapids Titans, Lehigh Valley Steelhawks and Omaha Beef. The Blizzard finished 11–3 again, for second place in the conference and three games behind the undefeated Storm. The Blizzard defeated the Edge in the first round, but again lost to the Storm for the United Conference Championship.

=== Playoff drought ===
==== 2013 season ====
With the Beef, Edge, and Steelhawks leaving the IFL for other leagues and the Express suspending operations, the United Conference was reduced to five teams for the 2013 season, with the Blizzard, Slaughter, Titans, and Storm all returning and the newly renamed Texas Revolution (formerly the Allen Wranglers) moving from the Intense Conference. Junior Aumavae, a nose tackle who spent the 2012 season playing for the Blizzard, was signed by the New York Jets in late March 2013. After compiling a 1–5 record in the season's first six games, head coach Robert Fuller was replaced by defensive coordinator Chad Baldwin. They finished the season 4–10.

2014 season

After the 2013 season, the Chicago Slaughter moved to the Continental Indoor Football League, but the United Conference continued to have five teams with the expansion Bemidji Axemen. In September 2013, Titletown Football Group, LLC sold their majority ownership stake in the team to Larry and Kathy Treankler. The Blizzard began the 2014 season under head coach Chad Baldwin. After the team began the season 0–6, Baldwin was replaced by offensive coordinator Tommie Williams for the remainder of the season. They finished 2–12, losing all of their road games as well as losing their last four games. The Blizzard also introduced their new logo during this season.

2015 season

Tommie Williams had his interim tag removed and was named the head coach of the Blizzard. The Blizzard brought back veteran quarterback Donovan Porterie and traded for Carl Sims. The Blizzard finished with a record of 6–8.

2016 season

On November 3, 2015, Williams and the Blizzard agreed to part ways. On December 7, 2015, Chris Williams was hired as the head coach of the Blizzard. The team finished with a record of 5–11, losing all but one road game.

2017 season

For the 2017 season, the Blizzard had a home record of 1–7 with the only home win being the last home game against the Salt Lake Screaming Eagles. The Blizzard finished with a record of 3–13;

2018 season

To open the 2018 season, the Blizzard started out 0–5 which lead to coach Chris Williams being relieved of his duties following the Week 6 bye, in which he was replaced by Corey Roberson as interim head coach. The Blizzard finished the season 2–12.

==== 2019 season ====
Corey Roberson was named head coach for the 2019 season. Under Roberson, the Blizzard had a 9–5 regular season record and qualified for the playoffs for the first time since 2012. Corey Roberson was named the IFL's Coach of the Year.

==== 2020 season ====
The League started on March 7 with two games, but after the COVID-19 pandemic, the IFL postponed and later canceled all of their games for the season.

==== 2021 season ====
After the hiatus from the previous season, the IFL returned and the Blizzard won only one road game, while they lost their last four games again for the second time in five complete seasons. The team finished 5–9.

==== 2022 season ====
In 2022, the IFL made the return of conferences for the first time since 2017, and the Green Bay Blizzard was selected to be in the Eastern Conference. The team finished 6–10.

==== 2023 season ====
In 2023, the Green Bay Blizzard won 4 of their 7 home games and only won 3 of their away games to finish 7-8 and missing playoffs. The Blizzard were awarded Community Relations of the Year, Franchise of the Year, and the owner Kathy Treankler won the John Petit Person of the Year award.

== Season-by-season results ==
League champions	Conference champions	Division champions	Playoff berth	League leader

Season	Team	League	Conference	Division	Regular season				Postseason results
Season	Team	League	Conference	Division	Finish	Wins	Losses	Ties	Postseason results
2003	2003	af2	National	Midwest	5th	2	14	0	
2004	2004	af2	National	Midwest	4th	6	10	0	
2005	2005	af2	American	East	3rd	9	7	0	Lost Wild Card round (Wilkes-Barre/Scranton) 41–48
2006	2006	af2	American	East	1st	10	6	0	Won Conference Semifinal (Memphis) 67–50; Won Conference Championship (Florida) 60–47; Lost ArenaCup VII (Spokane) 34–57
2007	2007	af2	American	Midwest	2nd	9	7	0	Won Conference Round 1 (Quad City) 39–34; Won Conference Semifinal (Louisville) 37–27; Lost Conference Championship (Wilkes-Barre/Scranton) 43–46
2008	2008	af2	American	Midwest	1st	11	5	0	Won Conference Round 1 (Lexington) 65–37; Lost Conference Semifinal (Manchester) 54–55
2009	2009	af2	American	Midwest	2nd	10	6	0	Won Conference Round 1 (Tennessee Valley) 60–56; Won Conference Semifinal (Iowa) 51–46; Lost Conference Championship (Wilkes-Barre/Scranton) 67–72
2010	2010	IFL	United	Central North	1st	10	4	0	Lost Conference Quarterfinal (Chicago) 39–46
2011	2011	IFL	United	Great Lakes	1st	11	3	0	Won Conference Semifinal (Reading) 68–51; Lost Conference Championship (Sioux Falls) 12–52
2012	2012	IFL	United		2nd	11	3	0	Won Conference Semifinal (Bloomington) 51–30; Lost Conference Championship (Sioux Falls) 42–61
2013	2013	IFL	United		5th	4	10	0	
2014	2014	IFL	United		5th	2	12	0	
2015	2015	IFL	United		3rd	6	8	0	
2016	2016	IFL	United		4th	5	11	0	
2017	2017	IFL	United		4th	3	13	0	
2018	2018	IFL			6th	2	12	0	
2019		IFL			4th	9	5	0	Lost First Round (Nebraska) 40–45
2020		IFL			Season cancelled due to COVID-19 pandemic				
2021		IFL			10th	5	9	0	
2022		IFL	Eastern		6th	6	10	0	
2023		IFL	Eastern		5th	7	8	0	
2024		IFL	Eastern		1st	13	3	0	Won First round (Quad City) 34–23; Lost Eastern Conference Championship (Massachusetts) 28–51
2025		IFL	Eastern		3rd	10	6	0	Won First round (Tulsa) 58–26; Won Eastern Conference Championship (Quad City) 71–64; Lost IFL National Championship (Vegas) 61–64
2026		IFL	Eastern		1st	13	3	0	Won First round (Orlando) 73–59; Won Eastern Conference Championship (Tulsa) 67–60 (OT); Lost IFL National Championship (Arizona) 51–62
Totals						174	175	0	All-time regular season record (2003–2026)
Totals						14	12	—	All-time postseason record (2003–2026)
Totals						188	187	0	All-time regular season and postseason record (2003–2026)

== Notable coaches ==
=== Head coaches ===
Note: Statistics are correct through the 2026 Indoor Football League season

Name	Term	Regular season				Playoffs		Awards
Name	Term	W	L	T	Win%	W	L	Awards
Jose Jefferson	2003	2	14	0	.125	0	0	
Brian Noble	2004	6	10	0	.375	0	0	
Bob Landsee	2005–2006; 2008–2009	40	24	0	.625	5	4	
Doug Lytle	2007	9	7	0	.563	2	1	
Rik Richards	2010–2011	21	7	0	.750	1	2	
Robert Fuller	2012–2013	12	8	0	.600	1	1	IFL Coach of the Year (2012)
Chad Baldwin	2013–2014	3	11	0	.214	0	0	
Tommie Williams	2014–2015	8	14	0	.364	0	0	
Chris Williams	2016–2018	8	29	0	.216	0	0	
Corey Roberson	2018–2026	65	51	0	.560	5	4	IFL Coach of the Year (2019), IFL Coach of the Year (2024)

== Notable players ==
=== Individual awards ===
The following is a list of all Blizzard players who have won league awards:

Most Valuable Player
Season	Player	Position
2025	Max Meylor	QB
2026	Liam Thompson	QB

Defensive Player of the Year
Season	Player	Position
2024	Ravarius Rivers	DB

Special Teams Player of the Year
Season	Player	Position
2011	B. J. Hill	KR
2013	B. J. Hill	KR
2018	B. J. Hill	KR
2026	Andrew Mevis	K

Most Improved Player
Season	Player	Position
2010	Maurice Simpkins	LB
2016	Markeith Summers	WR

Defensive Rookie of the Year
Season	Player	Position
2011	Arkeith Brown	DB
2019	Bakari Triggs	DB

Rookie of the Year
Season	Player	Position
2014	Nate Wara	QB

Adam Pringle Award
Season	Player	Position
2017	Jack Bramswig	WR
