= 2004 AF2 season =

- League: AF2
- Sport: Arena football

Regular season
- Season champions: Tulsa Talons

Playoffs
- American champions: Florida Firecats
- American runners-up: Wilkes-Barre/Scranton Pioneers
- National champions: Peoria Pirates
- National runners-up: Tulsa Talons

ArenaCup V
- Champions: Florida Firecats
- Runners-up: Peoria Pirates

AF2 seasons
- ← 2003 2005 →

The 2004 AF2 season was the fifth season of the AF2. It was preceded by 2003 and succeeded by 2005. The league champions were the Florida Firecats, who defeated the Peoria Pirates in ArenaCup V.

== League info ==
New teams	Central Valley Coyotes, Laredo Law, Oklahoma City Yard Dawgz, Rio Grande Valley Dorados
Renamed / Relocated teams	Mohegan Wolves → Manchester Wolves
Defunct teams	Charleston Swamp Foxes, Cincinnati Swarm, Greensboro Prowlers, Norfolk Nighthawks, Richmond Speed, Rochester Brigade
Total teams	25

== Standings ==
Team	Overall			Division		
Team	Wins	Losses	Percentage	Wins	Losses	Percentage
American Conference
Northeast Division
Wilkes-Barre/Scranton Pioneers	13	3	0.812	7	2	0.778
Cape Fear Wildcats	12	4	0.750	6	3	0.667
Albany Conquest	6	10	0.375	2	7	0.285
Manchester Wolves	5	11	0.312	3	6	0.333
Southern Division
Florida Firecats	10	6	0.625	6	2	0.750
Birmingham Steeldogs	10	6	0.625	4	2	0.667
Columbus Wardogs	6	10	0.375	2	5	0.285
Macon Knights	3	13	0.187	2	5	0.285
Mid-South Division
Tennessee Valley Vipers	12	4	0.750	5	1	0.833
Memphis Xplorers	10	6	0.625	4	2	0.667
Bossier-Shreveport Battle Wings	5	11	0.312	1	5	0.167
Arkansas Twisters	4	12	0.250	2	4	0.333
National Conference
Southwest Division
Tulsa Talons	13	3	0.812	9	3	0.750
Oklahoma City Yard Dawgz	10	6	0.625	8	4	0.667
Wichita Stealth	8	8	0.500	5	7	0.417
Rio Grande Valley Dorados	6	10	0.375	6	6	0.600
Laredo Law	3	13	0.187	2	10	0.167
Midwest Division
Quad City Steamwheelers	10	6	0.625	4	2	0.667
Louisville Fire	9	7	0.562	3	3	0.500
Peoria Pirates	9	7	0.562	3	3	0.500
Green Bay Blizzard	6	10	0.375	2	4	0.333
Western Division
Bakersfield Blitz	11	5	0.687	10	2	0.833
San Diego Riptide	8	8	0.500	6	6	0.500
Hawaiian Islanders	8	8	0.500	6	6	0.500
Central Valley Coyotes	3	13	0.187	2	10	0.167

- Green indicates clinched playoff berth
- Purple indicates division champion
- Grey indicates best regular season record

== Playoffs ==
Oklahoma City	Bakersfield, California
6	Peoria	45
6	Peoria	38
3	Oklahoma City	36	Tulsa, Oklahoma
2	Bakersfield	36
National Conference
Moline, Illinois	6	Peoria	30
Tulsa, Oklahoma
1	Tulsa	28
5	Louisville	53	National Conference Championship
5	Louisville	42
4	Quad Cities	48	Estero, Florida
1	Tulsa	49
Wild Card Round
Conference Semifinals
Estero, Florida	N6	Peoria	26
Huntsville, Alabama
A4	Florida	39
5	Memphis	33	ArenaCup V
4	Florida	62
4	Florida	35	Wilkes-Barre, Pennsylvania
2	Tennessee Valley	58
American Conference
Fayetteville, North Carolina	4	Florida	41
Wilkes-Barre, Pennsylvania
1	Wilkes-Barre/Scranton	31
6	Birmingham	53	American Conference Championship
3	Cape Fear	37
3	Cape Fear	54
1	Wilkes-Barre/Scranton	40

== ArenaCup V ==
V

Quarter	1	2	3	4	Tot
Florida Firecats	6	13	17	3	39
Peoria Pirates	0	13	0	13	26

Date
August 27, 2004
Arena
Germain Arena
City
Estero, Florida
Attendance
6,491
Offensive Player of the Game
Magic Benton
Defensive Player of the Game
Comone Fisher
Ironman of the Game
Brent Burnside
Winning Coach
Ben Bennett
Losing Coach
Bruce Cowdrey

ArenaCup V was the 2004 edition of the AF2's championship game, in which the National Conference Champions Florida Firecats defeated the American Conference Champions Peoria Pirates in Estero, Florida by a score of 39 to 26 .

=== Scoring Summary ===
Scoring summary

Quarter	Time	Drive			Team	Scoring information	Score	
Quarter	Time	Plays	Yards	TOP	Team	Scoring information	Peoria Pirates	Florida Firecats
1	9:14	9	36	5:46	Florida Firecats	26-yard field goal by Brandon Kornblue	0	3
1	2:24	5	26	3:01	Florida Firecats	24-yard field goal by Brandon Kornblue	0	6
2	13:39	7	12	3:45	Peoria Pirates	35-yard field goal by Henrik Juul-Nielsen	3	6
2	12:34	2	41	2:09	Florida Firecats	Brent Burnside 36-yard touchdown reception from Ken Mastrole, Brandon Kornblue kick Good	3	13
2	10:09	2	21	1:21	Florida Firecats	Magic Benton 15-yard touchdown reception from Ken Mastrole, Brandon Kornblue kick Failed	3	19
2	6:46	4	45	4:45	Peoria Pirates	Lawrence Matthews 30-yard touchdown reception from Andrew Webb, Henrik Juul-Nielsen kick Good	10	19
2	0:02	8	40	1:33	Peoria Pirates	20-yard field goal by Henrik Juul-Nielsen	13	19
3	10:02	4	37	2:38	Florida Firecats	Cainon Lamb 7-yard touchdown reception from Ken Mastrole, Brandon Kornblue kick Good	13	26
3	5:57	2	12	1:06	Florida Firecats	Magic Benton 5-yard touchdown reception from Ken Mastrole, Brandon Kornblue kick Good	13	33
3	0:28	6	20	3:42	Florida Firecats	24-yard field goal by Brandon Kornblue	13	36
4	6:03	6	49	3:49	Peoria Pirates	Casey Urlacher 4-yard touchdown run, Henrik Juul-Nielsen kick Good	20	36
4	2:24	1	34	0:22	Peoria Pirates	Milton Bowen 34-yard touchdown reception from Andrew Webb, 2-point Andrew Webb Pass Failed	26	36
4	0:40	4	5	1:44	Florida Firecats	21-yard field goal by Brandon Kornblue	26	39
"TOP" = time of possession. For other American football terms, see Glossary of American football.							Peoria Pirates	Florida Firecats
