= Louisville Fire =

American arena football team

Logo

General information
- Founded: 2001
- Folded: 2008
- Headquartered: Freedom Hall in Louisville, Kentucky
- Colors: Fire engine red, black and flame gold

Personnel
- Owner: Will Wolford
- Head coach: Ron Selesky (2001); Jeff Brohm (2002); Wally English (2003); Tommy Johnson (2003–2008)

Team history
- Louisville Fire (2001–2008)

Home fields
- Freedom Hall (2001–2008)

League / conference affiliations
- af2 (2001–2008): National Conference (2001–2004); American Conference (2005–2008); Midwestern Division (2001–2004); Eastern Division (2005–2006); Midwest Division (2007–2008)

Championships
- Conference championships: 1; 2005
- Division championships: 3; 2001, 2003, 2004

Playoff appearances (4)
- 2004, 2005, 2007, 2008

The Louisville Fire was an arena football team that played its home games at the Brown-Forman Field in Freedom Hall in Louisville, Kentucky. They were a 2001 expansion team of the af2. Their owner/operator was former Pro Bowl lineman and Louisville native Will Wolford. The team was somewhat successful. After a rocky first few seasons they finally found success in 2004 and then made it all the way to the Arena Cup in the 2005 season.

On December 19, 2001, Jeff Brohm was named the head coach of the Fire. The Fire started the 0–7 before they defeated the Carolina Rhinos 31–28 to improve to 1–7. The Fire finished the season 2–14.

In 2003, English was hired to replace Brohm as the head coach. He was fired after just two games with a record of 2–2.

In July 2007, it was announced that the team planned on selling portions of the team to local ownership (aka the NFL's Green Bay Packers) in an attempt to boost season ticket sales and then buy the shares back in time before the team joined the AFL.

In November 2008, the Fire ceased operations.

== Award winners ==
- 2004 – Takua Furutani – International Player of the Year
- 2005 – Matthew Sauk – Offensive Player of the Year
- 2005 – Danny Kight – Kicker of the Year
- 2006 – Brett Dietz – Rookie of the Year
- 2006 – Rob Mager – Offensive Player of the Year
- 2008 – Elizabeth "Liz" Horrall – Miss Louisville Fire Football

== Season-by-season ==
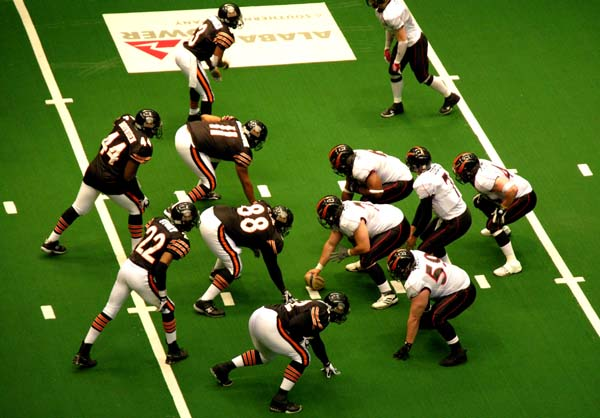
On offense against Birmingham in May 2006 at the BJCC Arena.

Season records
Season	W	L	T	Finish	Playoff results
2001	6	10	0	6th NC Midwest	--
2002	2	14	0	4th NC Midwest	--
2003	5	11	0	3rd NC Midwest	--
2004	9	7	0	2nd NC Midwest	Won NC Round 1 (Quad City 53–48); Lost NC Semifinal (Tulsa 49–42)
2005	11	5	0	2nd AC East	Won AC Round 1 (Macon 55–54); Won AC Semifinal (Manchester 69–56); Won AC Championship (Florida 70–40); Lost ArenaCup VI (Memphis 63–41)
2006	9	7	0	4th AC East	Lost AC Round 1 (Memphis 83–61)
2007	9	7	0	3rd AC Midwest	Won AC Round 1 (Spokane 62–35); Lost AC Semifinals (Green Bay 37–27)
2008	8	8	0	4th AC Midwest	--
Totals	62	71	0	(including playoffs)	

== See also ==
- Sports in Louisville, Kentucky
