= 2008 AF2 season =

- League: AF2
- Sport: Arena football

Regular season
- Season champions: Wilkes-Barre/Scranton Pioneers

Playoffs
- American champions: Tennessee Valley Vipers
- American runners-up: Manchester Wolves
- National champions: Spokane Shock
- National runners-up: Amarillo Dusters

ArenaCup IX
- Champions: Tennessee Valley Vipers
- Runners-up: Spokane Shock
- Finals MVP: Tony Colston (QB, TV)

AF2 seasons
- ← 2007 2009 →

The 2008 AF2 season was the ninth season of the AF2. It was preceded by 2007 and succeeded by 2009. The regular season began on Friday, March 28 and ended on Saturday, July 26. The league champions were the Tennessee Valley Vipers, who beat the Spokane Shock in ArenaCup IX.

== League info ==
New teams	Austin Wranglers, Daytona Beach ThunderBirds, Iowa Barnstormers, Lexington Horsemen, Peoria Pirates,
Renamed / Relocated teams	None
Defunct teams	Alabama Steeldogs, Bakersfield Blitz, Cincinnati Jungle Kats, Everett Hawks, Fort Wayne Fusion, Laredo Lobos
Total teams	29

== Standings ==
Team	Overall			Division		
Team	Wins	Losses	Percentage	Wins	Losses	Percentage
American Conference
East Division
Wilkes-Barre/Scranton Pioneers	14	2	0.875	8	1	0.889
Manchester Wolves	9	7	0.562	7	3	0.700
Albany Conquest	5	11	0.312	2	8	0.200
Mahoning Valley Thunder	3	13	0.188	2	7	0.222
Midwest Division
Green Bay Blizzard	11	5	0.688	7	3	0.700
Lexington Horsemen	9	7	0.562	5	6	0.455
Quad City Steamwheelers	8	8	0.500	6	5	0.545
Louisville Fire	8	8	0.500	6	5	0.545
Iowa Barnstormers	6	10	0.375	5	6	0.455
Peoria Pirates	4	12	0.250	3	7	0.300
South Division
South Georgia Wildcats	12	4	0.750	6	3	0.667
Florida Firecats	10	6	0.625	7	3	0.700
Tennessee Valley Vipers	10	6	0.625	5	3	0.625
Daytona Beach ThunderBirds	2	14	0.125	0	9	0.000
National Conference
Central Division
Tulsa Talons	12	4	0.750	5	3	0.625
Arkansas Twisters	11	5	0.688	5	3	0.625
Lubbock Renegades	9	7	0.562	4	5	0.444
Amarillo Dusters	8	8	0.500	3	6	0.333
Oklahoma City Yard Dawgz	6	10	0.375	4	4	0.500
Southwest Division
Bossier-Shreveport Battle Wings	9	7	0.562	6	2	0.750
Austin Wranglers	8	8	0.500	5	3	0.625
Rio Grande Valley Dorados	7	9	0.438	5	4	0.556
Corpus Christi Sharks	7	9	0.438	5	5	0.500
Texas Copperheads	2	14	0.125	1	8	0.111
West Division
Spokane Shock	15	1	0.938	11	0	1.000
Central Valley Coyotes	10	6	0.625	7	4	0.636
Boise Burn	8	8	0.500	5	6	0.455
Stockton Lightning	5	11	0.312	3	10	0.231
Tri-Cities Fever	4	12	0.250	3	9	0.250

- Green indicates clinched playoff berth
- Purple indicates division champion
- Gray indicates best conference record

== All AF2 Team ==
=== American Conference First Team ===
- QB - Ryan Vena
- FB - Tim Murphy
- WR - Jesse Schmidt
- WR - Phillip Brock
- WR - P.J. Berry
- C - Raymond McNeil
- OL - Stephenol Santos
- OL - Aqua Etefia
- DL - Joe Sykes
- DL - Eric Scott
- DL - Isaac Hilton
- MLB - Gus Tyson
- JLB - Brady Chavez
- DB - Matt Forbes
- DB - Micheaux Robinson
- DB - Roland Cola
- K - Bob Forstrom
- ST - P.J Berry

Second team - QB: J.J. Raternick, FB: Demetrius Forney, WR: Kris Peters, WR: Maurice Brown, WR: Antwun Williams, C: Joe Villani, OL: Daniel Oliphant, OL: Mike Dansby, DL: Royce Morgan, DL: Terrance Ford, DL: Michael Lewis, MLB: Tyus Jackson, JLB: John Tackman, DB: Donnie Amadi, DB: Nate Green, DB: Carlos Campbell, K: Nick Hayes, ST: William Mulder

=== National Conference First Team ===
- QB - Kyle Rowley
- FB - Jason Schule
- WR - Chris Denney
- WR - Chavis McCollister,
- WR - Raul Vijil,
- C - Nick Codutti
- OL - Ryan Belcher
- OL - Chris Hollie
- DL - Ben McCombs
- DL - Estus Hood
- DL - Devon Parks
- MLB - Kamau Jackson
- JLB - Mel Long
- DB - Sergio Gilliam
- DB - Aaron Williams
- DB - Phillip Geiggar
- K - Nick Gatto
- ST - Ivory McCann

Second team - QB: Andy Hall, FB: Kamau Jackson, WR: Jeff Hughley, WR: Alvance Robinson, WR: John Roberson, Austin; C: Rico Ochoa, Spokane; OL: Kyle Young OL: Richard Seals DL: Tito Hannah DL: Shalom Tuimalealiifano DL: Neal Purvis, MLB: Marvin Byrdsong, Bossier-Shreveport; JLB: Jamar Ranson, Tulsa; DB: James Todd, DB: Delenell Reid, DB: Terrance Sanders, K: Brian Hazelwood, ST: Jeff Hughley.

== Playoffs ==
First Round	Conference Semifinals
7	Manchester	46
2	South Georgia	42
7	Manchester	55
3	Green Bay	54
6	Lexington	37
3	Green Bay	65
American Conference
5	Florida	33
4	Tennessee Valley	48
4	Tennessee Valley	34
1	Wilkes-Barre/Scranton	30
8	Quad Cities	29
1	Wilkes-Barre/Scranton	57
5	Central Valley	68
4	Arkansas	55
5	Central Valley	63
1	Spokane	83
8	Austin	14
1	Spokane	42
National Conference
7	Amarillo	65
2	Tulsa	62
7	Amarillo	59
3	Bossier-Shreveport	45
6	Lubbock	61
3	Bossier-Shreveport	77

Conference Championships
7	Manchester	35
4	Tennessee Valley	45
7	Amarillo	49
1	Spokane	79

ArenaCup IX
A4	Tennessee Valley (OT)	56
N1	Spokane	55

== ArenaCup IX ==
ArenaCup IX
Tennessee Valley Vipers (10-6)	Spokane Shock (15-1)
56	55
Head coach: Dean Cokinos	Head coach: Adam Shackleford
	1	2	3	4	OT	Total
Tennessee	7	14	13	14	8	56
Spokane	7	13	8	20	7	55
- Date: Monday, August 25, 2008
- Arena: Spokane Veterans Memorial Arena; Spokane, Washington
- MVP: QB Tony Colston, TEN (Offensive); DB Desmond Foster, TEN (Defensive); WR/DB Raul Vijil, SPO (Ironman)
- Attendance: 10,662

ArenaCup IX was the 2008 edition of the AF2's championship game, played on Monday, August 25, 2008, in which the American Conference Champions Tennessee Valley Vipers defeated the National Conference Champion Spokane Shock in Spokane, Washington by a score of 56–55 in overtime.

=== Scoring summary ===
Scoring summary

Quarter	Time	Drive			Team	Scoring information	Score	
Quarter	Time	Plays	Yards	TOP	Team	Scoring information	Tennessee Valley Vipers	Spokane Shock
1	12:32	3	23	2:13	Tennessee Valley Vipers	Alonzo Nix 5-yard touchdown reception from Kevin Eakin, Nick Hayes kick Good	7	0
1	11:07	2	17	0:42	Spokane Shock	Raul Vijil 6-yard touchdown reception from Nick Davila, Brian Jackson kick Good	7	7
2	14:56	4	45	2:08	Spokane Shock	Raul Vijil 17-yard touchdown reception from Nick Davila, Brian Jackson kick Good	7	14
2	12:45	2	34	1:29	Tennessee Valley Vipers	Alonzo Nix 22-yard touchdown reception from Tony Colston, Nick Hayes kick Good	14	14
2	5:15	1	38	0:13	Tennessee Valley Vipers	Gary Elliot 38-yard touchdown reception from Tony Colston, Nick Hayes kick Good	21	14
2	0:58	5	37	3:26	Spokane Shock	Raul Vijil 13-yard touchdown reception from Nick Davila, Brian Jackson kick Failed	21	20
3	11:35	1	17	0:16	Tennessee Valley Vipers	Gary Elliot 17-yard touchdown reception from Tony Colston, Nick Hayes kick Good	28	20
3	7:55	4	43	2:55	Spokane Shock	Kelvin Dickens 12-yard touchdown reception from Nick Davila, 2-point Nick Davila Rush Successful	28	28
3	3:05	5	30	3:47	Tennessee Valley Vipers	Alonzo Nix 9-yard touchdown reception from Tony Colston, Nick Hayes kick Failed	34	28
4	13:45	6	45	3:38	Spokane Shock	Raul Vijil 17-yard touchdown reception from Nick Davila, Brian Jackson kick Good	34	35
4	11:55	2	45	1:17	Tennessee Valley Vipers	Gary Elliot 33-yard touchdown reception from Tony Colston, Nick Hayes kick Good	41	35
4	9:36	2	24	1:44	Spokane Shock	Kelvin Dickens 9-yard touchdown reception from Nick Davila, Brian Jackson kick Blocked	41	41
4	6:14	5	45	3:04	Tennessee Valley Vipers	Gary Elliot 33-yard touchdown reception from Tony Colston, Nick Hayes kick Good	48	41
4	1:17	6	41	4:27	Spokane Shock	Kelvin Dickens 12-yard touchdown reception from Nick Davila, Brian Jackson kick Good	48	48
OT	12:28	4	47	2:24	Spokane Shock	Kelvin Dickens 25-yard touchdown reception from Nick Davila, Brian Jackson kick Good	48	55
OT	9:42	4	39	1:38	Tennessee Valley Vipers	Alonzo Nix 24-yard touchdown reception from Tony Colston, 2-point Tony Colston Rush Successful	56	55
"TOP" = time of possession. For other American football terms, see Glossary of American football.							Tennessee Valley Vipers	Spokane Shock

=== Notable firsts ===
- First time since ArenaCup V in 2005 that the game was hosted at the higher seed's home venue (in the meantime, the Cup was held at neutral sites such as Bossier City and San Juan). It is also the first ArenaCup where the home team lost.
- First ArenaCup ever to go into overtime.
- First and only ArenaCup win for the Tennessee Valley Vipers, one of the original AF2 franchises who have played eight seasons so far.
