= Florida Firecats =

Arena football team

- Founded: 2001
- Folded: 2009
- Team history: Florida Firecats (2001–2009)
- Based in: Germain Arena in Estero, Florida
- Home arena: Germain Arena (2001–2009)
- League: AF2 (2001–2009): American Conference (2001–2006); Southeastern Division (2001); Southern Division (2002–2006); National Conference (2007); South Division (2007); American Conference (2008–2009); South Division (2008–2009)
- Colors: Purple, red, white

Personnel
- Head coach: Kevin Bouis
- Owner: Chris Vallozzi

Championships
- League titles (1): 2004
- Conference titles (2): 2002, 2004
- Division titles (3): 2005, 2006, 2007

Playoff appearances (7)
- 2002, 2003, 2004, 2005, 2006, 2007, 2008
- Website: FloridaFirecats.com

The Florida Firecats were a professional arena football team based in Estero, Florida. They played in the AF2, the Arena Football League's developmental league, from 2001 to 2009. They did not join the AFL following the leagues' reorganization in 2010. During their run they won the 2004 ArenaCup championship, two conference titles, and made a total of seven playoff appearances. They played their home games at Germain Arena.

== Season-by-season ==
Season records
Season	W	L	T	Finish	Playoff results
2001	7	9	0	5th AC Southeast	--
2002	9	7	0	2nd AC South	Won AC Round 1 (Tallahassee 43–31); Won AC Semifinal (Macon 44–28); Won AC Championship (Cape Fear 43–23); Lost ArenaCup III (Peoria 65–47)
2003	10	6	0	2nd AC South	Lost AC Round 1 (Macon 42–16)
2004	10	6	0	2nd AC South	Won AC Round 1 (Memphis 35–33); Won AC Semifinal (Tennessee Valley 62–58); Won AC Championship (Wilkes-Barre/Scranton 41–31); Won ArenaCup V (Peoria 39–26)
2005	14	2	0	1st AC South	Won AC Semifinal (Wilkes-Barre/Scranton 59–45); Lost AC Championship (Louisville 70–40)
2006	13	3	0	1st AC South	Won AC Semifinal (Manchester 40–39); Lost AC Championship (Green Bay 60–47)
2007	11	5	0	1st NC South	Lost AC Round 1 (South Georgia 59–50)
2008	10	6	0	2nd AC South	Lost AC Round 1 (Tennessee Valley 48–33)
2009	7	9	0	4th AC South	--
Totals	100	59	0	(including playoffs)	

* = Current standing

== Uncertain future ==
The cancellation of the Arena Football League's 2009 season has left the future of many AF2 teams up in the air. 11 of the 25 AF2 teams have confirmed that they will be joining a new arena football league, Arena Football 1. The Florida Firecats are not one of those teams, and it is unclear whether they will continue to play in the AF2, seek another arena football league, or suspend operations.

The Firecats do not seem interested in joining AF1 and may be trying to join another indoor football league instead. Commissioner Jerry Kurz says the Firecats have yet to apply, and team president Chris Vallozzi was quoted as calling AF1 "an upstart league" without the AFL's 20 years of prior history, also saying they'd "keep all options open with all leagues."

== Notable players ==
See Category:Florida Firecats players
