= Defunct AF2 teams =

The following is a list of teams that, at one time, played in the AF2. This does not include teams in AF2 when the Board of Directors formed the New AFL in 2010.

Team	City	Arena	Founded	First AF2 season	Final AF2 season	Notes
Alabama Steeldogs	Birmingham, Alabama	Birmingham Jefferson Convention Center	1999	2000	2007	
Albany Conquest	Albany, New York	Times Union Center	2002	2002	2008	Same franchise as Albany Firebirds
Albany Firebirds	Albany, New York	Times Union Center	2002	2009	2009	Same franchise as Albany Conquest
Amarillo Dusters	Amarillo, Texas	Amarillo Civic Center	2003	2005	2009	
Arkansas Twisters	North Little Rock, Arkansas	Verizon Arena	1999	2000	2009	
Augusta Stallions	Augusta, Georgia	James Brown Arena	1999	2000	2002	
Austin Wranglers	Austin, Texas	Frank Erwin Center	2003	2008	2008	
Bakersfield Blitz 2002–2003	Bakersfield, California	Rabobank Arena	2002	2002	2003	Same franchise as Central Valley Coyotes
Bakersfield Blitz 2004–2007	Bakersfield, California	Rabobank Arena	2004	2004	2007	
Baton Rouge Blaze	Baton Rouge, Louisiana	Baton Rouge River Center Arena	2000	2001	2001	
Bismarck Bandits	Bismarck, North Dakota	Bismarck Event Center	2001	Never played		
Boise Burn	Boise, Idaho	Qwest Arena	2006	2007	2009	
Bossier–Shreveport Battle Wings	Bossier City, Louisiana	CenturyTel Center	2001	2001	2009	
Cape Fear Wildcats	Fayetteville, North Carolina	Crown Coliseum	2002	2002	2004	Same franchise as South Georgia Wildcats
Carolina Rhinos	Greenville, SC	Bi-Lo Center	1999	2000	2002	
Central Valley Coyotes	Fresno, California	Selland Arena	2002	2004	2009	Same franchise as Bakersfield Blitz 2002–2003
Charleston Swamp Foxes	North Charleston, SC	North Charleston Coliseum	1999	2000	2003	
Cincinnati Jungle Kats	Cincinnati, Ohio	U.S. Bank Arena	2006	2007	2007	
Cincinnati Swarm	Cincinnati, Ohio	U.S. Bank Arena	2002	2003	2003	
Columbus Wardogs	Columbus, Georgia	Columbus Civic Center	2000	2001	2004	Same franchise as Mississippi Headhunters
Corpus Christi Sharks	Corpus Christi, Texas	American Bank Center	2006	2007	2009	
Daytona Beach ThunderBirds	Daytona Beach, Florida	Ocean Center	2005	2008	2008	
Everett Hawks	Everett, WA	Everett Events Center	2001	2006	2007	
Florida Firecats	Estero, Florida	Germain Arena	2001	2001	2009	
Fort Wayne Fusion	Fort Wayne, Indiana	Allen County War Memorial Coliseum	2006	2007	2007	
Fresno Frenzy	Fresno, California	Selland Arena	2001	2002	2002	
Green Bay Blizzard	Ashwaubenon, Wisconsin	Resch Center	2003	2003	2009	
Greensboro Prowlers	Greensboro, NC	Greensboro Coliseum	1999	2000	2003	
Hawaiian Islanders	Honolulu, Hawaii	Neal S. Blaisdell Center	2001	2002	2004	
Iowa Barnstormers	Des Moines, Iowa	Wells Fargo Arena	1995	2001	2009	
Jacksonville Tomcats	Jacksonville, Florida	Jacksonville Memorial Coliseum	1999	2000	2002	
Kentucky Horsemen	Lexington, Kentucky	Rupp Arena	2002	2008	2009	
Lafayette Roughnecks	Lafayette, Louisiana	CajunDome	2000	2001	2001	
Laredo Law	Laredo, Texas	Laredo Entertainment Center	2003	2004	2004	
Laredo Lobos	Laredo, Texas	Laredo Entertainment Center	2005	2007	2007	
Lincoln Lightning	Lincoln, Nebraska	Pershing Municipal Auditorium	1998	2001	2001	
Louisville Fire	Louisville, Kentucky	Freedom Hall	2000	2001	2008	
Lubbock Renegades	Lubbock, Texas	City Bank Coliseum	2006	2007	2008	
Macon Knights	Macon, Georgia	Macon Coliseum	2000	2001	2006	
Mahoning Valley Thunder	Youngstown, Ohio	Covelli Centre	2007	2007	2009	
Manchester Wolves	Manchester, New Hampshire	Verizon Wireless Arena	2002	2004	2009	Same franchise as Mohegan Wolves
Memphis Xplorers	Southaven, Mississippi	DeSoto Civic Center	2000	2001	2006	
Milwaukee Iron	Milwaukee, Wisconsin	Bradley Center	2009	2009	2009	
Mississippi Headhunters	Biloxi, Mississippi		2001	Never played		Same franchise as Columbus Wardogs
Mobile Wizards	Mobile, Alabama	Mobile Civic Center	2001	2002	2002	
Mohegan Wolves	Uncasville, Connecticut	Mohegan Sun Arena	2002	2002	2003	Same franchise as Manchester Wolves
New Haven Ninjas	New Haven, Connecticut	New Haven Coliseum	2001	2002	2002	
Norfolk Nighthawks	Norfolk, Virginia	Norfolk Scope	1999	2000	2003	
Oklahoma City Yard Dawgz	Oklahoma City, Oklahoma	Cox Convention Center	2004	2004	2009	
Pensacola Barracudas	Pensacola, Florida	Pensacola Civic Center	1999	2000	2002	
Peoria Pirates	Peoria, Illinois	Peoria Civic Center	1999	2001	2009	
Quad City Steamwheelers	Moline, Illinois	iWireless Center	2000	2000	2009	
Richmond Speed	Richmond, Virginia	Richmond Coliseum	1999	2000	2003	
Rio Grande Valley Dorados	Hidalgo, Texas	State Farm Arena	2004	2004	2009	
Roanoke Steam	Roanoke, Virginia	Roanoke Civic Center	1999	2000	2002	
Rochester Brigade	Rochester, New York	Blue Cross Arena	2000	2001	2003	
San Diego Riptide	San Diego, California	San Diego Sports Arena	2001	2002	2005	
South Georgia Wildcats	Albany, Georgia	Albany Civic Center	2002	2005	2009	Same franchise as Cape Fear Wildcats
Spokane Shock	Spokane, Washington	Spokane Veterans Memorial Arena	2005	2006	2009	
Stockton Lightning	Stockton, California	Stockton Arena	2006	2006	2009	
Tallahassee Thunder	Tallahassee, Florida	Tallahassee-Leon County Civic Center	1999	2000	2002	
Tennessee Valley Vipers	Huntsville, Alabama	Von Braun Center	2000	2000	2009	
Texas Copperheads	Cypress, Texas	Richard E. Berry Educational Support Center	2005	2007	2008	
Toledo Bullfrogs	Toledo, Ohio	Lucas County Arena	2008	Never played		
Tri-Cities Fever	Kennewick, Washington	Toyota Center	2004	2007	2009	
Tulsa Talons	Tulsa, Oklahoma	BOK Center	1999	2000	2009	
Wichita Stealth	Wichita, Kansas	Kansas Coliseum	1999	2001	2004	
Wilkes-Barre/Scranton Pioneers	Wilkes-Barre, Pennsylvania	Mohegan Sun Arena at Casey Plaza	2001	2002	2009	
