= 2009 Arkansas Twisters season =

- Owner: Jim Smith; Jeff Everetts
- Head coach: Chris Siegfried
- Home stadium: Verizon Arena; North Little Rock, Arkansas

Results
- Record: 11-5 (regular season)
- Division place: 2nd, Southwestern Division
- Playoffs: Lost to Boise Burn in 1st Round

The 2009 Arkansas Twisters season was the franchise's tenth season as a football franchise, last in the arenafootball2 league, and final season as the "Arkansas Twisters". The National Conference team, led by head coach Chris Siegfried, played their home games on Allstate Field at Alltel Arena (which changed names to "Verizon Arena" mid-season) in North Little Rock, Arkansas. The Diamonds finished the 2009 regular season with an 11-5 record and 2nd place in the Southwest Division. The team's playoff run ended with a 36-77 loss to the Boise Burn in the first round.

== Off-field moves ==
After two seasons in the Central Division of the National Conference, the Twisters were realigned to the Southwest Division for the 2009 season. They joined the Bossier–Shreveport Battle Wings, Corpus Christi Sharks, and Rio Grande Valley Dorados in the Southwest Division.

The Twisters re-signed head coach Chris Siegfried for a second season after leading the team to a winning record and a short playoff run in 2008. The assistant coaches for 2009 were former Dallas Cowboys fullback and first-year coach Robert Thomas, four-time ArenaBowl champion player and 2004 ArenaBowl Defensive MVP Omar Smith, plus veteran assistant coach and East Tennessee State University alum Travis Crusenberry.

In April 2009, the team was alerted that two active players had been assigned the "retired" jersey numbers of former Twisters players Reggie Swinton and Kahlil Carter. The team blamed the error on a "former employee" who had ordered the team's new uniforms without checking with veteran front office staff.

2009 was the final year for Arkansas in arenafootball2 (af2) as the league was merged with remnants of the original Arena Football League to create Arena Football 1. Although they signed on as a charter member of Arena Football 1, Twisters ownership soon had issues with league restructuring and financial stability so they jumped to the Indoor Football League. To avoid buying the rights to the team's name and logo, the Arkansas franchise held a "name the team" contest and became the Arkansas Diamonds for the 2010 season, their last before relocating to Texas. Arkansas is the site of the only diamond mine in the United States.

== Roster moves ==
When pre-season training camp began on March 6, 2009, players included the 2008 AF2 Offensive Player of the Year, quarterback Kyle Rowley, plus defensive back Lawrence Richardson, wide receiver Robert Johnson, kicker James Paul, and prospect Xavier Lee.

Receiver Rod Harper left the team mid-season in June 2009 when he signed with the NFL's New Orleans Saints. Harper was the second Twisters player to jump directly from AF2 to the NFL. (The first was Reggie Swinton who played for the Twisters in 2000 before being signed by the Dallas Cowboys in 2001.)

== Schedule ==
Win Tie Loss Bye

=== Pre-season ===
| Week | Day | Date | Kickoff | Opponent | Results | | Location |
| Week | Day | Date | Kickoff | Opponent | Final Score | Team Record | Location |
|---|---|---|---|---|---|---|---|
| 1 | Wednesday | March 18 | 7:05pm | at Spokane Shock | L 28-35 | --- | Spokane Veterans Memorial Arena |

=== Regular season ===
| Week | Day | Date | Kickoff | Opponent | Results | | Location | Attendance |
| Week | Day | Date | Kickoff | Opponent | Final Score | Team Record | Location | Attendance |
|---|---|---|---|---|---|---|---|---|
| 1 | Saturday | March 28 | 7:05pm | Bossier–Shreveport Battle Wings | W 39-38 | 1-0 | Alltel Arena | 3,819 |
| 2 | Saturday | April 4 | 7:00pm | at Amarillo Dusters | W 45-24 | 2-0 | Amarillo Civic Center | 2,448 |
| 3 | Saturday | April 11 | 7:05pm | Rio Grande Valley Dorados | W 77-64 | 3-0 | Alltel Arena | 3,455 |
| 4 | Saturday | April 18 | 7:05pm | Tennessee Valley Vipers | L 60-61 | 3-1 | Alltel Arena | 3,739 |
| 5 | Friday | April 24 | 7:30pm | at Green Bay Blizzard | W 62-47 | 4-1 | Resch Center | 5,865 |
| 6 | Saturday | May 2 | 7:00pm | at Bossier–Shreveport Battle Wings | L 61-69 | 4-2 | CenturyTel Center | 2,978 |
| 7 | Saturday | May 9 | 7:05pm | Florida Firecats | W 55-42 | 5-2 | Alltel Arena | 3,698 |
| 8 | Saturday | May 16 | 9:00pm | at Central Valley Coyotes | W 68-51 | 6-2 | Selland Arena | 1,856 |
| 9 | Bye | | | | | | | |
| 10 | Saturday | May 30 | 7:05pm | at Corpus Christi Sharks | W 82-59 | 7-2 | American Bank Center | 3,842 |
| 11 | Saturday | June 6 | 7:05pm | Oklahoma City Yard Dawgz | L 54-56 | 7-3 | Alltel Arena | 4,263 |
| 12 | Saturday | June 13 | 7:00pm | at Tulsa Talons | L 47-56 | 7-4 | BOK Center | 5,511 |
| 13 | Saturday | June 20 | 7:05pm | Amarillo Venom | W 63-62 | 8-4 | Alltel Arena | 3,142 |
| 14 | Saturday | June 27 | 7:05pm | at Rio Grande Valley Dorados | W 57-54 | 9-4 | Dodge Arena | 4,410 |
| 15 | Bye | | | | | | | |
| 16 | Saturday | July 11 | 7:05pm | Corpus Christi Sharks | W 57-47 | 10-4 | Verizon Arena* | 3,250 |
| 17 | Saturday | July 18 | 7:05pm | Tulsa Talons | W 81-55 | 11-4 | Verizon Arena* | 4,261 |
| 18 | Saturday | July 25 | 7:00pm | at Bossier–Shreveport Battle Wings | L 50-64 | 11-5 | CenturyTel Center | 5,612 |

- Because of the sale of Alltel to Verizon Wireless, the Alltel Arena was renamed "Verizon Arena" on July 1, 2009.

=== Playoffs ===
| Round | Day | Date | Kickoff | Opponent | Results | | Location | Attendance |
| Round | Day | Date | Kickoff | Opponent | Final Score | Team Record | Location | Attendance |
|---|---|---|---|---|---|---|---|---|
| 1 | Saturday | August 1 | 7:00pm | at Boise Burn | L 36-77 | --- | Qwest Arena | 2,887 |

== Roster ==
2009 Arkansas Twisters roster
| Quarterbacks: 3 Kyle Rowley; Running backs: 6 Olan Coleman; 25 Chad Cook; Wide receivers: 81 Aaron Fairooz; 24 Cameron Kinard; 17 Xavier Lee; 15 Kenneth Williams | Offensive linemen: 79 Brandon Leyritz; 60 Isaac Morales; 74 Derik Stotland; Defensive linemen: 55 Vegas Franklin; 52 Tramaine Jehovah; 42 Aaron Robbins; 1 Jerry Turner | Linebackers: 19 Bernard Morris; Defensive backs: 8 Brandon Freeman; 2 Lawrence Richardson; 4 Travis Roland; 21 James Todd; Kickers: 23 Taylor Rowan | Injured Reserve: currently vacant; Exempt list: currently vacant; rookies in italics Roster updated July 25, 2009; 20 Active, 0 Inactive → More rosters |
