= Quorey Payne =

American football player (born 1982)

No. 1, 2, 3, 15
- Position: Wide receiver / Defensive back

Personal information
- Born: October 12, 1982 (age 44); Clewiston, Florida, U.S.
- Listed height: 5 ft 10 in (1.78 m)
- Listed weight: 185 lb (84 kg)

Career information
- High school: Clewiston
- College: Southern Illinois (2002–2005)
- NFL draft: 2006: undrafted

Career history
- Louisville Fire (2007); Green Bay Blizzard (2008); Corpus Christi Sharks (2008); Mahoning Valley Thunder (2009); Spokane Shock (2010); Cleveland Gladiators (2011); New Orleans VooDoo (2012–2014); Cleveland Gladiators (2015)

Awards and highlights
- ArenaBowl champion (2010)

Career AFL statistics
- Receptions: 220
- Receiving yards: 2,950
- Return yards: 3,547
- Total TDs: 60
- Stats at ArenaFan.com

Quorey Payne (born October 12, 1982) is an American former professional football wide receiver who played in the Arena Football League (AFL) for the Spokane Shock, Cleveland Gladiators, and New Orleans VooDoo. He played college football at Southern Illinois University Carbondale.

== Early life and college ==
Quorey Payne was born on October 12, 1982. He played high school football at Clewiston High School in Clewiston, Florida. He caught 30 passes for 522 yards and four touchdowns his junior year, earning all-district and all-region honors. Payne recorded 18 receptions for 400 yards as a senior, garnering all-state and all-region recognition, as the team finished 13–2. He was also a state champ in the 110 hurdles during both his junior and senior years. He lettered in basketball in high school as well.

Payne played college football for the Southern Illinois Salukis of Southern Illinois University Carbondale. He played in all 12 games, starting one, at cornerback in 2002 and returned 16 kickoffs for 336 yards. He appeared in six games during the 2003 season, returning seven punts for 46 yards. Payne switched to wide receiver in 2004. He played in all 12 games, starting two, during the 2004 season, catching 22 passes for 480 yards and six touchdowns. In 2005, Payne helped the Salukis win their first playoff game in 22 years. He finished his college career with 42 catches for 721 yards and seven touchdowns.

== Professional career ==
Payne played for the Louisville Fire of the af2 in 2007 and led the team in receiving that year. He began the 2008 af2 season with the Green Bay Blizzard and was second on the team in receiving before being traded. In late May 2008, Payne and Kirbie Bodiford were traded to the Corpus Christi Sharks for Brian Villanueva. Payne played for the Mahoning Valley Thunder of the af2 in 2009. He led the Thunder with 31 total touchdowns during the 2009 season. He recorded af2 career totals of 4,571 all-purpose yards and 57 touchdowns.

Payne was assigned to the Spokane Shock of the Arena Football League (AFL) on December 18, 2009. He was placed on injured reserve on April 19, activated on May 14, and placed on injured reserve again on July 8, 2010. He played in seven games overall during the 2010 season, totaling 20 receptions for 207 yards and two touchdowns, one rushing touchdown, six solo tackles, two assisted tackles, and a team-leading 31 kick returns for 624 yards and two touchdowns. On August 20, 2010, the Shock won ArenaBowl XXIII against the Tampa Bay Storm by a score of 69–57.

Payne was assigned to the AFL's Cleveland Gladiators on December 14, 2010. He was placed on injured reserve on March 12, 2011, activated on May 27, and placed on injured reserve again on July 29. He caught four passes for 54 yards and two touchdowns during the 2011 season while also returning 37 kicks for 747 yards and one touchdown.

Payne was assigned to the New Orleans VooDoo of the AFL on February 17, 2012. He played in 15 games for the VooDoo in 2012, recording a career-high 93 receptions for 1,264 yards and 23 touchdowns, and 31 kick returns for 582 yards. He was assigned to the VooDoo again on November 13, 2012. Payne was placed on refused to report on March 1, 2013, activated on March 18, reassigned on May 15, and activated again on May 16, 2013. He appeared in 12 games overall during the 2013 season, catching 53 passes for 798 yards and 13 touchdowns while also returning a career-high 69 kicks for 1,392 yards and four touchdowns. He was placed on inactive reserve on April 16, 2014, activated on May 22, placed on recallable reassignment on June 12, and activated on June 13, 2014. Overall, Payne played in eight games in 2014, totaling 48 receptions for 586 yards and ten touchdowns, and 12 kick returns for 202 yards.

Payne was assigned to the Gladiators again on April 14, 2015. He was placed on injured reserve on April 16, activated on June 18, and placed on injured reserve again on July 8, 2015. He caught two passes for 28 yards and two touchdowns in 2015 while also returning one kick for no yards.
