= 2008 Arkansas Twisters season =

Arena Football League team season

- Owner: Jim Smith; Jeff Everetts
- Head coach: Chris Siegfried
- Home stadium: Alltel Arena; North Little Rock, Arkansas

Results
- Record: 11–5 (regular season)
- Division place: 2nd, Central Division
- Playoffs: Lost to Central Valley Coyotes in first round

The 2008 Arkansas Twisters season was the franchise's ninth season as a football franchise in the arenafootball2 league. The National Conference team, led by head coach Chris Siegfried, played their home games on Allstate Field at Alltel Arena in North Little Rock, Arkansas. The Diamonds finished the 2008 regular season with an 11–5 record and 2nd place in the Central Division. The team's playoff run ended in the first round with a 55–68 loss to the Central Valley Coyotes.

== Off-field moves ==
2008 was the team's second season in the Central Division of the National Conference. Other teams in the Central Division this season were the Amarillo Dusters, Lubbock Renegades, Oklahoma City Yard Dawgz, and Tulsa Talons.

The Twisters hired new head coach Chris Siegfried. He had previously served as the head coach of the Spokane Shock in 2006. Siegfied would lead the team to a winning record (including a franchise record seven consecutive wins) and a short playoff run this season and return in 2009.

== Roster moves ==
Twisters players picked up post-season honors from the AF2 coaches and press. Quarterback Kyle Rowley was selected as the Schutt Offensive Player of the Year. Wide receiver Chris Denney was named Cutters Playmaker of the Year.

== Schedule ==
Win Tie Loss Bye

=== Regular season ===
Week	Day	Date	Opponent	Results		Location	Attendance
Week	Day	Date	Opponent	Final Score	Team Record	Location	Attendance
1	Saturday	April 5	at Oklahoma City Yard Dawgz	L 42–57	0–1	Ford Center	7,173
2	Friday	April 11	Tulsa Talons	L 60–64	0–2	Alltel Arena	5,662
3	Saturday	April 19	at Corpus Christi Sharks	W 39–27	1–2	American Bank Center	4,139
4	Saturday	April 26	Amarillo Dusters	W 54–46	2–2	Alltel Arena	4,942
5	Saturday	May 3	at Texas Copperheads	L 30–37	2–3	Berry Center	3,227
6	Saturday	May 10	Oklahoma City Yard Dawgz	W 68–25	3–3	Alltel Arena	5,520
7	Saturday	May 17	at Lubbock Renegades	L 57–64	3–4	City Bank Coliseum	2,426
8	Saturday	May 24	at Bossier–Shreveport Battle Wings	W 69–55	4–4	CenturyTel Center	3,810
9	Saturday	May 31	Corpus Christi Sharks	W 51–44	5–4	Alltel Arena	5,094
10	Saturday	June 7	at Amarillo Dusters	W 48–26	6–4	Amarillo Civic Center	2,222
11	Saturday	June 14	Lubbock Renegades	W 61–25	7–4	Alltel Arena	4,931
12	Saturday	June 21	at Tri-Cities Fever	W 51–28	8–4	Toyota Center	4,358
13	Saturday	June 28	Iowa Barnstormers	W 55–46	9–4	Alltel Arena	5,460
14	Bye						
15	Saturday	July 12	at Tulsa Talons	W 66–54	10–4	Tulsa Convention Center	6,450
16	Saturday	July 19	Bossier–Shreveport Battle Wings	L 69–80	10–5	Alltel Arena	6,244
17	Saturday	July 26	Texas Copperheads	W 78–26	11–5	Alltel Arena	6,212

=== Playoffs ===
Round	Day	Date	Opponent	Results		Location	Attendance
Round	Day	Date	Opponent	Final Score	Team Record	Location	Attendance
1	Sunday	August 3	Central Valley Coyotes	L 55–68	0–1	Alltel Arena	2,905
