= Anthony Midget =

American football player and coach (born 1978)

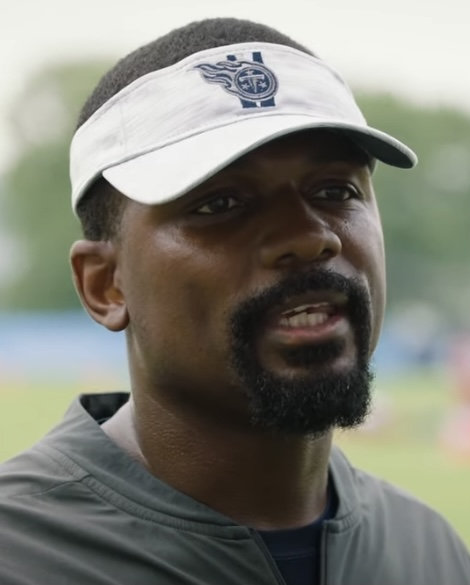
- Midget in 2021

Virginia Tech Hokies
- Title: Pass game coordinator & safeties coach

Personal information
- Born: February 22, 1978 (age 48); Clewiston, Florida, U.S.
- Listed height: 5 ft 11 in (1.80 m)
- Listed weight: 187 lb (85 kg)

Career information
- Position: Cornerback
- High school: Clewiston (FL)
- College: Virginia Tech
- NFL draft: 2000: 5th round, 134th overall pick

Career history

Playing
- Atlanta Falcons (2000)*; Tampa Bay Buccaneers (2000–2002)*; Minnesota Vikings (2002)*
- * Offseason or practice squad member only

Coaching
- Lake Worth (FL) HS (2002–2006) Assistant coach; Virginia Tech (2007) Graduate assistant; Georgia State (2008–2011) Defensive backs coach/special teams coordinator; Georgia State (2012) Defensive coordinator/defensive backs coach; Penn State (2013) Safeties coach; Houston Texans (2014–2017) Assistant secondary coach; Houston Texans (2018–2019) Secondary coach; Tennessee Titans (2020–2022) Defensive backs coach; Florida State (2023) Defensive analyst; Pittsburgh Steelers (2024–2025) Assistant secondary coach; Virginia Tech (2026–present) Pass game coordinator/safeties coach

Anthony Midget (born February 22, 1978) is an American football coach. He is the pass game coordinator and safeties coach for the Virginia Tech Hokies. He played college football at Virginia Tech. After a short-lived career playing professionally in the National Football League (NFL), Midget began coaching beginning at the high school level and then progressing from college to the NFL.

== Playing career ==
Midget played high school football in Clewiston, Florida at Clewiston High School. From there, he proceeded to Virginia Tech, where he was a four-year letter winner and three-year starter. After his senior season, Midget was named a third-team All-American, first-team All-Big East, and a member of the Big East All-Academic Team. A Dean's List student, Midget graduated with a degree in sociology in 1999. He was drafted in the fifth round of the 2000 NFL draft by the Atlanta Falcons as a cornerback. He also spent two seasons on the practice squad of the Tampa Bay Buccaneers.

== Coaching career ==
After his short-lived playing career, Midget began his coaching career in 2002 at Lake Worth High School in Florida where he held many positions culminating with being the assistant head coach and defensive coordinator. In 2007, he went back to his alma mater at Virginia Tech as a graduate assistant. From Virginia Tech, Midget progressed to Georgia State where, from 2008 to 2011, he served as the special teams coordinator and defensive backs coach and in 2012 he served as the defensive coordinator and defensive backs coach. He was briefly hired in January 2013 to serve as a defensive assistant at Marshall, but before he coached a game at Marshall he was hired at Penn State to coach safeties.

In 2014, the Houston Texans hired Midget as their Assistant Secondary Coach, and in 2018, he was promoted to Secondary Coach. On January 28, 2020, it was announced that Midget was hired as the secondary coach for the Tennessee Titans.

On January 9, 2023, the Titans head coach Mike Vrabel announced Midget had been fired.

On March 20, 2024, the Pittsburgh Steelers announced that they had hired Midget as their assistant secondary coach.

On December 31, 2025, the Virginia Tech Hokies football team announced that they had hired Midget as their pass game coordinator & safeties coach.
