= P. J. Berry =

American football player (born 1982)

P.J. Berry
No. 8
- Position: Wide receiver

Personal information
- Born: December 18, 1982 (age 43); Hopewell, Virginia
- Listed height: 6 ft 0 in (1.83 m)
- Listed weight: 200 lb (91 kg)

Career information
- High school: Hopewell (VA)
- College: Virginia State
- NFL draft: 2006: undrafted

Career history
- South Georgia Wildcats (2008); Bossier-Shreveport Battle Wings (2009–2010); New Orleans VooDoo (2011); Pittsburgh Power (2012–2013); San Antonio Talons (2014)

Awards and highlights
- American Conference All-af2 First Team (2008); 2× First Team All-Arena (2011, 2012); 2× All-Ironman Team (2011); Ironman of the Year (2011)

Career AFL statistics
- Receptions: 469
- Receiving yards: 5,365
- Kickoff return yards: 6,589
- Rushing yards: 97
- Total TDs: 127
- Stats at ArenaFan.com

Pharisse J. Berry (born December 18, 1982) is an American former professional football wide receiver who played in the Arena Football League (AFL). Berry played collegiately at Virginia State University.

== Early life ==
Born the son of Pharisse Sr. and Virginia Berry, P.J. attended Hopewell High School in Hopewell, Virginia, where he was a two-sport star, lettering in football and baseball. He was an All-District selection in football as a junior and senior, while playing defensive back, quarterback and returned punts. Played baseball for three seasons, where he started mainly in centerfield, and also notched some innings as a pitcher. He was named All-Region twice in baseball. Voted to the Hopewell All-Decade Team for the 2000s (2000–09).

== College career ==
Berry chose to continue his athletic career in college at Virginia State University, where he was a four-year letterwinner and was named All-Central Intercollegiate Athletic Association all four years at Virginia State. Selected All-Conference as a wide receiver as a freshman and sophomore, selected as kick returner as a junior and senior. Garnered All-American First Team honors as kick returner his senior season from the American Coaches Association. He is one of only two players to ever be named an All-American in football at Virginia State. In 2005, he was second in the nation returning kicks with a 34.4 yards/return average. He compiled over 3,000 all-purpose yards for his career. Named Division II Player of the Year for the state of Virginia in 2005. Also played baseball for Virginia State, where he was selected All-CIAA every season as a centerfielder, and boasted a .310 career batting average. Led the nation in stolen bases as a senior in 2005, swiping 39-of-40 attempts.

== Professional career ==
=== South Georgia Wildcats ===
After sitting out a few years, Berry signed and played with the South Georgia Wildcats of the af2, in 2008, recording 3,229 all-purpose yards. As a receiver, Berry caught 92 passes totaling 1,425 yards and including 28 touchdown receptions. As a kick returner, Berry scored 6 touchdowns on his way to accumulating 1,753 return yards, as well as adding 2 rushing touchdowns. For his efforts, he was named American Conference All-af2 First Team.

=== Bossier-Shreveport Battle Wings ===
For the 2009 season, Berry joined the af2 Bossier-Shreveport Battle Wings. In his 2nd year with the team, the Battle Wings joined the re-formed Arena Football League. There Berry posted 118 catches for 1,352 yards and had 33 touchdowns. He also had 65 kick-off returns for 1,171 yards and 2 touchdowns.

=== New Orleans VooDoo ===
Berry signed with the New Orleans VooDoo on January 5, 2010 for the 2011 season. Berry set new AFL single-season records in all-purpose yards (3,708) and kickoff returns (101) in 2011. He became the first player in VooDoo history and the first from a New Orleans franchise since 1991 to win the award. Offensively, Berry ranked fourth in the AFL in receptions with 155. He led the VooDoo in receiving with 1,593-yards and 27 touchdowns on the year. He also notched 47-yards and nine touchdowns on the ground this season. As a returnman, Berry led the League with 2,043 kick return yards and five touchdowns, giving him 41 total touchdowns on the year. As a result of his fantastic play all season, Berry was named the 2011 JLS Ironman of the Year.

=== Pittsburgh Power ===
Berry signed with the Pittsburgh Power for the 2012 season. In 2012, he caught 111 passes for 1,282 yards and 18 touchdowns. Berry finished the season with First Team All-AFL honors and All-Ironman recognition as a special teams player after recording 111 kick returns for a Power franchise record of 2,024 yards.

Berry re-signed with the Power on March 6, 2013.

=== San Antonio Talons ===
Berry was assigned to the San Antonio Talons on January 30, 2014. The Talons folded after the 2014 season.
