= Antonio Narcisse =

American football player (born 1982)

No. 69
- Position: Center

Personal information
- Born: August 4, 1982 (age 44); New Orleans, Louisiana, U.S.
- Listed height: 6 ft 2 in (1.88 m)
- Listed weight: 340 lb (154 kg)

Career information
- High school: Sarah T. Reed (New Orleans)
- College: Portland State
- NFL draft: 2006: undrafted

Career history
- New Orleans VooDoo (2007); Cleveland Gladiators (2007–2008); Spokane Shock (2010–2011); Utah Blaze (2011–2013); Iowa Barnstormers (2013–2014)*; Portland Thunder (2014)*; Pittsburgh Power (2014); Jacksonville Sharks (2015)*; San Jose SaberCats (2015)
- * Offseason or practice squad member only

Awards and highlights
- ArenaBowl champion (2015); First-team All-Arena (2014); First-team All-Big Sky (2004)
- Stats at ArenaFan.com

Antonio Narcisse (born August 4, 1982) is an American former professional football center who played in the Arena Football League (AFL). He played college football at Portland State. He was a member of the New Orleans VooDoo, Cleveland Gladiators, Spokane Shock, Utah Blaze, Iowa Barnstormers, Portland Thunder, Pittsburgh Power, Jacksonville Sharks and San Jose SaberCats.

== College career ==
Narcisse attended Sarah T. Reed High School in New Orleans, Louisiana. He first played college football at the College of San Mateo.

Narcisse then transferred to play for the Portland State Vikings of Portland State University, earning All-Big Sky honorable mention honors his senior year in 2005 and First Team All-Big Sky honors in 2004.

== Professional career ==
Narcisse was rated the 15th best center in the 2006 NFL draft by NFLDraftScout.com.

Narcisse was signed by the New Orleans VooDoo of the AFL on February 15, 2007. He signed with the AFL's Cleveland Gladiators on November 21, 2007. He was assigned to the Spokane Shock of the AFL on September 17, 2010. Narcisse was traded to the Utah Blaze with Khreem Smith for Erik Meyer and Raymond McNeil on May 29, 2011. He was assigned to the AFL's Iowa Barnstormers on September 6, 2013. He was traded to the Portland Thunder on March 11, 2014. Narcisse was traded to the Pittsburgh Power on March 26, 2014. He was named First Team All-Arena in 2014. The Power folded in November 2014. On March 14, 2015, he was assigned to the Jacksonville Sharks of the AFL. On March 25, 2015, Narcisse was placed on reassignment. On July 30, 2015, he was assigned to the AFL's San Jose SaberCats. The Sabercats won ArenaBowl XXVIII against the Jacksonville Sharks on August 29, 2015.
