= Bobby Keyes (gridiron football) =

American football player (born 1982)

No. 35
- Position: Defensive back

Personal information
- Born: November 14, 1982 (age 43); Raleigh, Mississippi, U.S.
- Listed height: 6 ft 0 in (1.83 m)
- Listed weight: 186 lb (84 kg)

Career information
- College: UAB
- NFL draft: 2005: undrafted

Career history
- 2005: Washington Redskins*
- 2006: Birmingham Steeldogs
- 2007–2008: Dallas Desperados
- 2009: Edmonton Eskimos
- * Offseason or practice squad member only

Awards and highlights
- First-team All-af2; AFL All-Rookie Team
- Stats at CFL.ca
- Stats at ArenaFan.com

Bobby Keyes (born November 14, 1982) is an American former professional football defensive back. He played college football for the UAB Blazers.

== College career ==
He played football for Jones County Junior College before attending University of Alabama-Birmingham, where he was twice most valuable defensive back as well as first-team All Conference.

== Professional career ==
Keyes was originally signed as a rookie undrafted free agent by the Washington Redskins of the National Football League in the 2005 NFL season but was released at the end of training camp.

He signed with the Birmingham Steeldogs of the Af2 arena football league in 2006 and led the team with 66 tackles, 17 pass knockdowns, and 8 interceptions. He was named to the All-Af2 First-team. He then went on to the Dallas Desperados of the Arena Football League, where he played from 2007 to 2008. In 2007, he had 39.5 defensive tackles, 9.5 special teams tackles. He led all AFL rookies and set a Dallas Desperados rookie club record with 6 interceptions, and a team record by recording 5 interceptions in 5 consecutive games, despite being nearly half the season on the injured reserve list. His accomplishments got him named to the AFL All-Rookie Team. In 2008, he had 9 defensive tackles before being placed on the injured reserve list on May 21.

On May 29, 2009, Keyes signed as a free agent with the Edmonton Eskimos of the Canadian Football League. On August 29, 2009, he recorded his first CFL interception and returned it 67 yards. It was also notable as the first, long-awaited interception of the 2009 Edmonton Eskimos season, for which he won the first interception pool into which players had paid $20 each week and had finally amounted to over $1000 by week 9.

== Personal life ==
When not playing football, Keyes makes his home in Oklahoma City, Oklahoma, with his wife Zakia and his two young sons named Braylon and Sean-Cole Keyes.
