= Erick Harris (American football) =

American gridiron football player (born 1982)

No. 3, 15, 45
- Position: Defensive back/Linebacker

Personal information
- Born: December 17, 1982 (age 43); Crestview, Florida, U.S.
- Listed height: 5 ft 11 in (1.80 m)
- Listed weight: 210 lb (95 kg)

Career information
- College: Liberty
- NFL draft: 2005: undrafted

Career history
- Amarillo Dusters (2005); Alabama Steeldogs (2006); Philadelphia Eagles (2006–2007)*; → Amsterdam Admirals (2007); Kansas City Chiefs (2007–2008)*; Grand Rapids Rampage (2008)*; Manchester Wolves (2009); Cleveland Gladiators (2010); Kansas City Command (2011); Orlando Predators (2012); Tampa Bay Storm (2012)
- * Offseason or practice squad member only

Career AFL statistics
- Total tackles: 42
- Pass deflections: 11
- Interceptions: 3

Erick Anthony Harris (born December 17, 1982) is an American former gridiron football defensive back and linebacker. He was signed by the Amarillo Dusters as a street free agent in 2005. He played college football at Liberty University.

Harris was also a member of the Alabama Steeldogs, Philadelphia Eagles, Kansas City Chiefs, Grand Rapids Rampage, Cleveland Gladiators \, Kansas City Command, Orlando Predators, and Tampa Bay Storm.

== College career ==
As a sophomore wide receiver in 2002, Harris led Liberty in receiving with 24 catches for 480 yards and three touchdowns. In 2003 Harris moved to the defensive side of the ball, and tied for a team-high three interceptions in both 2003 and 2004. In 2004, he became the first player in Big South Conference history to return two punts for scores in a single game, doing so against the University of Tennessee at Chattanooga on November 6. Along with his conference record, Harris also received national Special Teams Player of the Week honors.

== Professional career ==
Harris began his professional career with the Amarillo Dusters of the af2 in 2005, playing in two games and recording 4.5 tackles while adding three catches for 31 yards. In 2006, he joined the Alabama Steeldogs where he played wide receiver and defensive back. In 14 regular-season games Harris totaled 25 receptions, 261 receiving yards, six receiving touchdowns, 41 tackles and one pass breakup. He also led the Steeldogs with 26 kickoff returns for 426 yards.

=== Philadelphia Eagles ===
In 2006 and 2007, Harris was named to the practice squad for the NFL’s Philadelphia Eagles as a safety for both the 2006 and 2007 seasons. Prior to the 2007 NFL season he was allocated by the Eagles to the Amsterdam Admirals of NFL Europe where he logged two interceptions before returning to Philadelphia for training camp. Harris was cut at the end of training camp but called back to the team in Week 6, though later released again in Week 9.

=== Kansas City Chiefs ===
On December 7, 2007, the Kansas City Chiefs added Harris to their practice squad, where he participated in OTAs but was ultimately released the week prior to training camp.

=== Arena Football ===
In 2009, Harris signed with the Arena Football League's Manchester Wolves prior to Week 12, playing in five regular season games and one playoff game. During those six games he recorded three interceptions including two pick-sixes (interception returns for touchdowns), four pass break-ups and 30 tackles. He began 2010 with the Cleveland Gladiators and participated in their training camp, but he was released in Week 4 due to a quadriceps injury. In 2011 as a member of the Kansas City Command, Harris split time at defensive back and jack linebacker. He played in 10 of 18 games for the Command, combining for 25 tackles, five pass break-ups, and one interception, along with returning a fumble for a touchdown. In his final season Harris signed with the Orlando Predators in 2012. He started the last six games of the season at jack linebacker, recording 30 tackles, two pass break-ups, two fumble recoveries, and one interception.
