= Montey Stevenson =

American football player (born 1985)

Profile
- Position: Defensive tackle

Personal information
- Born: April 8, 1985 (age 41); Cleburne, Texas, U.S.
- Listed height: 6 ft 2 in (1.88 m)
- Listed weight: 290 lb (132 kg)

Career information
- College: North Texas
- NFL draft: 2008: undrafted

Career history
- 2008: New Orleans VooDoo
- 2009: Calgary Stampeders*
- * Offseason or practice squad member only
- Stats at ArenaFan.com

Montey Stevenson (born April 8, 1985) is an American former football defensive tackle. He was signed by the New Orleans VooDoo as an undrafted free agent in 2008. He played college football at North Texas. Stevenson was also a member of the Calgary Stampeders.

== Professional career ==
=== NFL ===
After going undrafted in the 2008 NFL draft, Stevenson attended a tryout camp for the Minnesota Vikings and a mini-camp with the New Orleans Saints.

=== New Orleans VooDoo ===
Stevenson signed with the New Orleans VooDoo shortly after attending mini-camp with the Saints.

=== Calgary Stampeders ===
On February 19, 2009, Stevenson was signed by the Calgary Stampeders.
