= Isaac Morales =

Isaac Morales may refer to:

- Isaac Morales (footballer) (born 1980), Mexican football manager and former defender
- Isaac Morales (American football) (born 1983), American football linesman
