= Ja'Markis Weston =

American football player (born 2000)

No. 47 – Carolina Panthers
- Position: Linebacker
- Roster status: Practice squad

Personal information
- Born: August 10, 2000 (age 26)
- Listed height: 6 ft 2 in (1.88 m)
- Listed weight: 234 lb (106 kg)

Career information
- High school: Clewiston (Clewiston, Florida)
- College: Florida (2019–2024)
- NFL draft: 2025: undrafted

Career history
- New York Jets (2025); Seattle Seahawks (2025)*; Carolina Panthers (2026–present)
- * Offseason or practice squad member only

Awards and highlights
- Super Bowl champion (LX)

Career NFL statistics as of 2025
- Tackles: 2
- Stats at Pro Football Reference

Ja'Markis Weston (born August 10, 2000) is an American professional football linebacker for the Carolina Panthers of the National Football League (NFL). He played college football for the Florida Gators and was signed by the New York Jets as an undrafted free agent in 2025.

== Early life ==
Weston is from Clewiston, Florida. His mother was an athlete who held the Clewiston shot put record and, according to Weston, could bench press 350 pounds (160 kg). Weston attended Clewiston High School, where he played football, making the varsity team as a freshman. He was not highly recruited, receiving a three-star rating and being ranked the 69th-best wide receiver in his recruiting class by 247Sports. However, he received significant interest from the Florida Gators, impressing the coaches with his strength (bench-pressing 330 pounds (150 kg) and squatting 500 pounds (230 kg) by 2019) and speed (running a 10.6-second 100 metres at Clewiston). Weston committed to play college football for the Gators.

== College career ==
Weston appeared in three games as a true freshman in 2019 and redshirted. He appeared in eight games, recording a tackle in 2020, then played in nine games in 2021 and caught a touchdown pass. Weston played in 12 games in 2022 on special teams.

Though Weston began his Florida career as a wide receiver, he was unable to win a starting role and switched positions several times. He changed to safety at one point, later moved to linebacker and then to defensive end. He recorded four tackles in the 2023 season while appearing in five games. He played mostly on special teams as a senior in 2024, tallying nine tackles, a sack and a forced fumble. While at Florida, Weston was able to bench press 525 pounds (238 kg) and squat 605 pounds (274 kg), while weighing 235 pounds (107 kg) and running a 40-yard dash in 4.4 seconds. Because of Weston's athletic abilities and his repeated position changes, David Whitley of The Gainesville Sun said that, "If Dr. Frankenstein could construct a football player, Weston would emerge from the lab."

== Professional career ==
Pre-draft measurables
Height	Weight	Arm length	Hand span	Wingspan	40-yard dash	10-yard split	20-yard split	20-yard shuttle	Three-cone drill	Vertical jump	Broad jump	Bench press
6 ft 2 5/8 in (1.90 m)	234 lb (106 kg)	32 3/4 in (0.83 m)	8 1/4 in (0.21 m)	6 ft 5 1/2 in (1.97 m)	4.65 s	1.67 s	2.69 s	4.39 s	7.28 s	29.0 in (0.74 m)	9 ft 10 in (3.00 m)	20 reps
All values from Pro Day

=== New York Jets ===
After going unselected in the 2025 NFL draft, Weston signed with the New York Jets as an undrafted free agent. He was placed on injured reserve on August 26, 2025, and activated on October 18. Weston made his NFL debut in the team's Week 7 game against the Carolina Panthers, recording one tackle. On November 22, Weston was waived by the Jets.

=== Seattle Seahawks ===
On December 2, 2025, Weston was signed to the Seattle Seahawks' practice squad. On February 12, 2026, he signed a reserve/futures contract with Seattle.

Weston was waived by the Seahawks on August 1, 2026.

=== Carolina Panthers ===
On October 26, 2026, Weston was signed to the Carolina Panthers practice squad.
