= Josh Lay =

American football player (born 1982)

No. 36, 24
- Position: Cornerback

Personal information
- Born: September 8, 1982 (age 44); Aliquippa, Pennsylvania, U.S.
- Listed height: 6 ft 1 in (1.85 m)
- Listed weight: 197 lb (89 kg)

Career information
- College: Pittsburgh
- NFL draft: 2006: 6th round, 174th overall pick

Career history
- New Orleans Saints (2006)*; St. Louis Rams (2006); Berlin Thunder (2007); St. Louis Rams (2007)*; California Redwoods (2009); Pittsburgh Power (2011–2012)
- * Offseason or practice squad member only
- Stats at ArenaFan.com

Bernard "Josh" Lay (born September 8, 1982) is an American former professional football player who was a cornerback in the National Football League (NFL). He was selected by the New Orleans Saints in the sixth round of the 2006 NFL draft. He played college football for the Pittsburgh Panthers.

Lay was also a member of the St. Louis Rams, Berlin Thunder, California Redwoods, and Pittsburgh Power.

== Early life ==
Lay attended Aliquippa High School, where he was a three-year starter at cornerback. He was a prep school quarterback, wide receiver and cornerback at Valley Forge Military Academy in 2001 before attending Pittsburgh.

== Professional career ==
Pre-draft measurables
Height	Weight	Arm length	Hand span	40-yard dash	10-yard split	20-yard split	Vertical jump	Broad jump	Bench press
6 ft 0 in (1.83 m)	197 lb (89 kg)	31 7/8 in (0.81 m)	8 3/4 in (0.22 m)	4.54 s	1.48 s	2.61 s	40.5 in (1.03 m)	10 ft 0 in (3.05 m)	16 reps
All values from NFL Combine

=== New Orleans Saints ===
Lay was selected in the sixth round (174th pick overall) of the 2006 NFL draft by the New Orleans Saints. On July 17, 2006, he agreed to a three-year contract with the Saints. He was waived by the Saints on September 1.

=== St. Louis Rams ===
Lay was signed by the Rams on December 13, 2006. The team assigned him to the Berlin Thunder of NFL Europa on February 24, 2007. The Rams waived Lay on August 31. He was then signed to their practice squad on September 5. Lay was released from St. Louis' practice squad on September 11.

=== California Redwoods ===
Lay was signed by the California Redwoods of the United Football League on September 2, 2009.

=== Pittsburgh Power ===
Lay was signed by the Pittsburgh Power of the Arena Football League on February 24, 2011. During the 2011 season, Lay played in 14 games for the Power, starting 10. He made 34.5 tackles and intercepted four passes, returning one for a touchdown. He re-signed with the team on December 5. However, following a players' strike, Lay was placed on League Suspension on April 5, 2012, where he remained for the entirety of the season.
