= Glenn Glass =

American football player (born 1940)

No. 87, 43, 49
- Positions: Defensive back, flanker

Personal information
- Born: February 16, 1940 (age 86); Holopaw, Florida, U.S.
- Listed height: 6 ft 1 in (1.85 m)
- Listed weight: 205 lb (93 kg)

Career information
- High school: Clewiston (Clewiston, Florida)
- College: Tennessee (1958–1961)
- NFL draft: 1962: 17th round, 231st overall pick
- AFL draft: 1962: 2nd round, 12th overall pick

Career history
- Buffalo Bills (1962); Pittsburgh Steelers (1962–1963); Philadelphia Eagles (1964–1965); Atlanta Falcons (1966); Denver Broncos (1966)

Awards and highlights
- Second-team All-SEC (1960)

Career NFL/AFL statistics
- Interceptions: 2
- Fumble recoveries: 4
- Receptions: 15
- Receiving yards: 201
- Stats at Pro Football Reference

Glenn Murray Glass (born February 16, 1940) is an American former professional football player who was a defensive back for five seasons in the National Football League (NFL) with the Pittsburgh Steelers, Philadelphia Eagles and Atlanta Falcons. He was selected by the Buffalo Bills in the second round of the 1962 AFL draft after playing college football for the Tennessee Volunteers. He was also a member of the Denver Broncos of the American Football League (AFL).

== Early life ==
Glenn Murray Glass was born on February 16, 1940, in Holopaw, Florida. He attended Clewiston High School in Clewiston, Florida.

== College career ==
Glass was a member of the Tennessee Volunteers of the University of Tennessee from 1958 to 1961 as a running back and quarterback. He was on the freshman team in 1958 and a three-year letterman from 1959 to 1961. He rushed 75 times for 261 yards and three touchdowns in 1959 while also completing four of 12 passes for 52 yards and three interceptions. In 1960, Glass totaled 90 carries for 478 yards and a Southeastern Conference (SEC)-leading eight touchdowns, and 11 completions on 26 passing attempts for 167 yards, two touchdowns, and two interceptions. He was named second-team All-SEC by United Press International for the 1960 season. As a senior in 1961, he recorded 59 rushing attempts for 261 yards and three touchdowns, and five completions on 16 passes for 70 yards, one touchdown, and three interceptions. He missed time his senior year due to a facial injury. He majored in transportation at Tennessee.

== Professional career ==
Glass was selected by the Buffalo Bills in the second round, with the 12th overall pick, of the 1962 AFL draft and by the Chicago Bears in the 17th round, with the 231st overall pick, of the 1962 NFL draft. He signed with the Bills for a "sizable" bonus. He played in Chicago Charities College All-Star Game in August 1962 and suffered an ankle injury during the game. On September 20, it was reported that Glass had been cleared to return to practice. On October 21, it was announced that he had been waived by the Bills.

Glass was then claimed off waivers by the Pittsburgh Steelers of the National Football League (NFL). He played in seven games for the Steelers during the 1962 season and was listed as a defensive back. He returned 16 kicks for 396 yards that year. Glass started all 14 games for the Steelers in 1963, recording one interception, one fumble recovery, and two kick returns for 46 yards.

On July 8, 1964, Glass and Red Mack were traded to the Philadelphia Eagles for Bob Harrison and Clarence Peaks. Glass appeared in 13 games for the Eagles during the 1964 season, totaling one interception, two fumble recoveries, and one kick return for 12 yards. He was moved to flanker in 1965. He played in 12 games, starting five, that year, catching 15 passes for 201 yards while also recovering one fumble. Glass was released by the Eagles on August 23, 1966.

Glass signed with the Atlanta Falcons of the NFL on September 22, 1966. He played in three games for the Falcons before being waived on October 22, 1966. He was listed as a flankerback with the Falcons.

Glass was then signed by the AFL's Denver Broncos in late October 1966. He played in six games for the Broncos that year and was listed as a defensive back. He was released in 1967.

== Personal life ==
Glass is a coin collector.
