= Pittsburgh Power =

Arena football team

Logo

General information
- Founded: 2010
- Folded: 2014
- Headquartered: Consol Energy Center in Pittsburgh, Pennsylvania
- Colors: Black, gold

Team history
- Pittsburgh Power (2011–2014)

Home fields
- PPG Paints Arena (2011–2014)

League / conference affiliations
- Arena Football League (2011–2014): American Conference (2011–2014); East Division (2011–2014)

Playoff appearances (1)
- 2014

The Pittsburgh Power were a professional arena football team based in Pittsburgh, Pennsylvania. The team belonged to the East Division of the American Conference in the Arena Football League. Founded in 2010, the Power was the youngest franchise in the American Conference. The team played its home games at Consol Energy Center, which they shared with the Pittsburgh Penguins of the National Hockey League. The Power shared the same color scheme (black and gold) as Pittsburgh's other professional sports teams, the Pittsburgh Steelers of the National Football League, the Pittsburgh Maulers of the USFL, and the Pittsburgh Pirates of Major League Baseball.

Pittsburgh was the fourth city added for the 2011 AFL season, joining the San Jose SaberCats, Kansas City Command and their new in-state rivals the Philadelphia Soul – who were all returning to the Arena Football League after a two-year absence.

The franchise competed through the 2014 season, where they finished a franchise best 15–3, but ownership decided to cease operations on November 17, 2014. AFL Commissioner Scott Butera said, "We are trying to affect a transaction that will allow the Power to continue to play in Pittsburgh." The team did not play as part of the AFL for the 2015 season, nor has it subsequently.

== History ==
=== Pittsburgh's prior AFL history ===
Prior to the announcement of Pittsburgh's 2011 expansion team, the city was the home to the Pittsburgh Gladiators, one of the four original franchises of the Arena Football League in 1987. The AFL's very first league game, not counting the playtest games at the Rockford MetroCenter and the Rosemont Horizon, was played in the Pittsburgh Civic Arena between the Gladiators and Washington Commandos. The Gladiators would go on to lose ArenaBowl I to the Denver Dynamite, 45–16, that season in a game played at the Civic Arena. Two years later, the team lost ArenaBowl III, held at Joe Louis Arena, to the Detroit Drive by a score of 39–26.

The following season was the Gladiators' fourth and last in Pittsburgh after co-owner Bob Greis decided to move the franchise to Tampa, Florida. The team was renamed the Tampa Bay Storm. Greis, who had several business interests in Florida, sold the franchise a few years later. During the Storms' first year in Tampa, the team defeated the Detroit Drive, 48–42, to win ArenaBowl V. The Storm remained in Tampa and reached the playoffs in each of their next 15 seasons, winning four more AFL titles.

In 2011, Jerry Kurz, the commissioner of the Arena Football League, stated to the Pittsburgh Tribune-Review that the Gladiators move to Tampa had nothing to do with the attendance for the games. He instead stated that the issues that prompted the team to relocate had more to do with the lack of additional accouterments at the Civic Arena, such as updated luxury suites.

=== 2011 expansion season ===
The current AFL policy is to give expansion teams in markets previously served by AFL teams the same name as their predecessor, since the league owns almost all rights to all team names in the league's history. However, because the unrelated Cleveland Gladiators already use the "Gladiators" name, that required the adoption of a new franchise name. Incidentally, the Power's logo is a thunderbolt, the same as a previous Cleveland AFL team, Cleveland Thunderbolts.

The team was originally rumored to be called the Pittsburgh River Wizards, according to sports blog Inside Pittsburgh Sports and by Pittsburgh-area radio host Mark Madden. The team name was changed to the Power before the official announcement by the team.

The Power played their first game in franchise history on March 11, 2011 at Consol Energy Center in front of 13,904 fans. They lost to the Philadelphia Soul in overtime by a score of 58–52. Despite this loss, the Power led the East Division with a 7–4 record at the end of week 13. However, they lost five of their final seven games, falling to 9–9 at the end of the season and finishing second in the division.

=== 2012 season ===
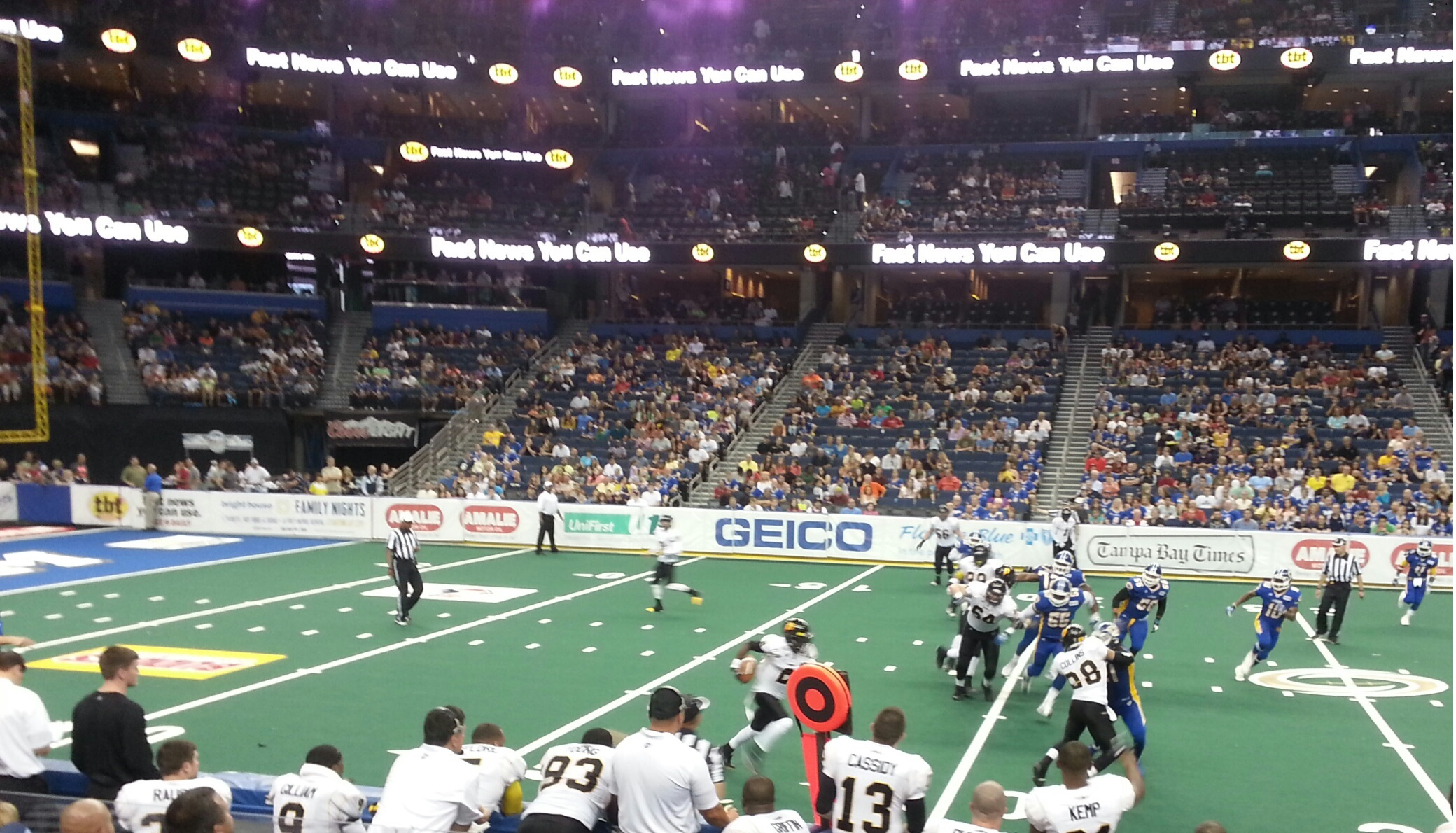
Pittsburgh Power playing against the Tampa Bay Storm at the Tampa Bay Times Forum on July 20, 2013.

On March 9, 2012, the entire Pittsburgh Power roster was released prior to its opening game against the Orlando Predators due to a labor disagreement between the owners and the players' union. However, with the aid of a few replacements, the team managed to win 40–26. Following the victory, 22 of the 24 released players were offered their jobs back (quarterback Kyle Rowley and kicker Taylor Rowan being the lone exceptions), with 18 immediately accepting and returning to the team. Neil Purvis signed a contract a few days later, bringing the total to 19. Defensive backs Josh Lay and Tyrrell Herbert and offensive lineman Dan Jones elected not to re-sign with the Power and were consequentially placed on the League Suspension list. Jones was traded to the Kansas City Command on May 2, 2012.

On April 14, the Power orchestrated the largest comeback in Arena Football League history. Down 48–17 in the third quarter to the Orlando Predators, backup quarterback Derek Cassidy led the team on a 34–3 run, taking the game into overtime. After the Predators kicked a field goal to make it 54–51, P. J. Berry returned the ensuing kickoff 38 yards to the Predators' 19-yard line. On the very next play, Cassidy connected with Christian Wise for a touchdown to win the game 57–54.

On June 8, the Power were scheduled to face the Cleveland Gladiators at Quicken Loans Arena. However, due to yet another labor dispute, the Gladiators failed to field enough players and forfeited, making the Power the first team in Arena Football League history to win in this manner.

On June 16, Power kicker Geoff Boyer successfully converted a two-point drop kick against the Milwaukee Mustangs. It was the first successful drop kick in the Arena Football League since 1997.

With a 5–13 record, the Power failed to qualify for the playoffs with a last place finish in the division.

=== 2013 season ===
On March 23, the Power opened the 2013 season against the Utah Blaze. The Power were still in the playoff hunt through Week 10 with a 3–6 record, but a 7-game losing streak lost the Power their chance at a playoff spot.

With a 4–14 record, the Power failed to qualify for the playoffs with a last place finish in the division.

=== 2014 season ===
During the off-season following the 2013 season, the Power made drastic changes to their roster. In addition to reassigning nearly every player from the previous season's roster, the team acquired quarterback Tommy Grady and wide receiver Aaron Lesué in the Utah Blaze dispersal draft. The Power also traded their franchise leader in nearly every receiving category, Mike Washington, to the Spokane Shock for quarterback Arvell Nelson. Near the end of the off-season, the team acquired wide receiver Prechae Rodriguez in a trade with the Orlando Predators. By the time of the season opener, the Power's 24-man roster contained only four players who had played with the team in 2013 (Curtis Young, Brandon Freeman, Sergio Gilliam and Julian Rauch).

On March 15, the Power opened the season against the Cleveland Gladiators. After a net recovery touchdown by Arvell Nelson in the third quarter, the Power took a 45–28 lead. However, the Gladiators outscored the Power 35–8 the rest of the way to pull out a comeback victory. Head coach Derek Stingley was fired six days later and replaced by former Utah Blaze head coach Ron James.

James's first move was to acquire center Antonio Narcisse from the Portland Thunder. Narcisse had played with quarterback Tommy Grady (and under James) with the Utah Blaze from 2011 to 2013. Narcisse was the first of several players that James brought to the Power from his coaching tenures with the Blaze and Las Vegas Gladiators.

James led the Power to three consecutive wins in his first three games, during which the Power outscored opponents by a combined score of 174–78. However, back-to-back road trips to undefeated Arizona and Cleveland brought consecutive losses.

At 3–3, the Power returned home to face the Philadelphia Soul, whom they had never defeated at Consol Energy Center. The Power set a new record against the Soul for points scored at home (65) in what would become their first of 12 consecutive wins to conclude the regular season. During this streak, the Power set new team records for wins in a season (15), consecutive wins (12), consecutive home wins (8) and consecutive road wins (6). The Power clinched their first winning season on June 14 against the Soul and their first playoff berth on June 20 against the Iowa Barnstormers.

== Ownership ==
In the original ownership group, Matt Shaner was the principal owner and general manager of the team. Former Pittsburgh Steelers wide receiver Lynn Swann, an NFL Hall-of-Famer and Republican 2006 gubernatorial nominee, was also part of the team's ownership group. Shaner's family owns the Pittsburgh Marriott City Center Hotel. Like Swann, Matt Shaner was once a political candidate. In 2008 he ran an unsuccessful campaign for the Pennsylvania House of Representatives. After the Colorado Crush, Kansas City Command, and Philadelphia Soul, the Power are the fourth team in Arena Football League history to have a former NFL player as part of its ownership group.

On February 7, 2014, Trib Total Media purchased a multimillion-dollar stake in the Power, joining Shaner and Swann. The team will be run with a board of directors that will be chaired by Shaner, with Ralph Martin and Swann also on the board.

The franchise enjoyed the best season in 2014, posting a 15-3 record and earning their first playoff berth, but on November 17, 2014, the Power ownership group decided to cease operations.

== Players ==
=== All-Arena players ===
The following Power players were named to All-Arena Teams:

- OL Antonio Narcisse, Colin Madison
- K Julian Rauch
- KR P. J. Berry

=== All-Ironman players ===
The following Power players were named to All-Ironman Teams:

- WR/KR P. J. Berry, 2012

== Head coaches ==
The Power had three coaches through their history. Their first coach was Chris Siegfried, who coached them to a 9–9 record in 2011. Siegfried had the longest term as head coach with the Power. Hired during the 2012 season, the Power's second coach was Derek Stingley. Ron James was hired as the team's third coach one game into the 2014 season.

Name	Term	Regular season				Playoffs		Awards
Name	Term	W	L	T	Win%	W	L	Awards
Chris Siegfried	2011–2012	11	17	0	.393	0	0	
Derek Stingley	2012–2014	7	20	0	.259	0	0	
Ron James	2014	15	2	0	.882	0	1	

== Season-by season ==
ArenaBowl champions	Conference champions	Division champions	Playoff berth

Season	Team	League	Conference	Division	Regular season			Postseason results
Season	Team	League	Conference	Division	Finish	Wins	Losses	Postseason results
Pittsburgh Power
2011	2011	AFL	American	East	2nd	9	9	
2012	2012	AFL	American	East	4th	5	13	
2013	2013	AFL	American	East	3rd	4	14	
2014	2014	AFL	American	East	2nd	15	3	Lost Conference Semifinals (Orlando) 48–56
Total						33	39	(includes only regular season)
Total						0	1	(includes only the postseason)
Total						33	40	(includes both regular season and postseason)
