= Bakersfield Blitz =

Arena football team

Logo

General information
- Founded: 2003
- Folded: 2007
- Headquartered: Rabobank Arena in Bakersfield, California
- Colors: Navy blue, red, silver, white

Personnel
- Owners: Peter Martin; Dr. Vip Dev; Clayton Koerner; Scott Garrison; Scotty Gelt; Paul Press; Scott Erwin; SportsGelt LLC; Scott Atkins
- General manager: Andrew Watkins
- Head coach: Gary Compton
- President: Andrew Watkins

Team history
- Bakersfield Blitz (2004–2007)

Home fields
- Rabobank Arena (2003–2007)

League / conference affiliations
- AF2 (2004–2007): National Conference (2004–2006); Western Division (2004–2006); American Conference (2007); West Division (2007)

Championships
- Division championships: 1; 2004

Playoff appearances (2)
- 2004, 2006

The Bakersfield Blitz were a professional arena football team based in Bakersfield, California. They were a 2002 expansion member of the AF2 and played their home games at Rabobank Arena.

In 2001, the original Blitz was owned by Casey Wasserman, owner of the Arena Football League (AFL) team the Los Angeles Avengers. He owned and managed the team for two seasons. During their Inaugural season the team captured a Western Division title and a playoff berth. The head coach for the team was announced on December 7, 2001. Head coach James Fuller originally came out of Portland State into the NFL where he played for the 1992–1994 San Diego Chargers and the Philadelphia Eagles in 1996–97 as a defensive back. He was head coach of the Bakersfield Blitz during their 2002–03 and 2003–04 seasons. He went on from his time with the Blitz to become the head coach for the AFL team Philadelphia Soul owned by Jon Bon Jovi.

In 2004, the team was sold to an investment group that moved the team to Fresno to become the Central Valley Coyotes, while a new Bakersfield Blitz was formed. In 2005, the AF2 owned the team, and was operated by the owner of the Bakersfield Condors.

In 2006, a combination of local Bakersfield and professional sports investors bought the franchise from the AF2. However, the Blitz unexpectedly folded after the 2007 season. Although this followed a season in which two players faced rape charges, it is unclear what role, if any, this played in the Blitz's folding.

== Owners ==
In December 2001, a new AF2 franchise was established in Bakersfield. Owner Casey Wasserman (owner of the L.A. Avengers) hired Brad Hoffman as the first Bakersfield Blitz General Manager. Hoffman managed the team along with staff members Todd Anderson (Public Relations), Mike Krause (Administration), Joel Hupp (Production) and Margo Ivester (Game Operations). The team's coaching staff was led by: Head Coach James Fuller, Fullback/Linebacker Coach Steven Folmar and Offensive/Defensive Assistant Rick Van Horne.

The owners at the time the Blitz ceased operations: Jeff Allen, Scott Atkins, Dr. Vip Dev, William Edwards, Scott Erwin, Dr. Todd Farrer, Scott Garrison, Scotty Gelt, Scott Hacker, Clayton Koerner, Paul Press, Fred Prince, Joel Shaddy, Andrew Watkins, and SportsGelt Partners among others.

== The Bakersfield High School All Star Arena Bowl ==
General Manager Brad Hoffman along with his staff came up with the idea of creating an arena style high school All-Star game to help promote arena football in Kern County. Hoffman's brainchild was the first arena style all-star game in the nation and continues to be the only arena style all-star game in the United States. Although the Blitz franchise changed ownership several times the huge interest in this unique game has kept it alive, even after the Blitz franchise folded in August 2007. It is now known as the "Bakersfield Arena Bowl." It is played every Spring....usually in April on the Blitz' former turf.

Several of today's NFL Stars and Stars of the Future have played in the game. Most notably is Philadelphia Eagles RB #24 Ryan Mathews who still holds records for scoring in the game. Others who have played is New Orleans Saints QB Derek Carr (brother of David Carr) and USC QB Cody Kessler.

== RB Julian Yearwood's death ==
On July 19, 2003 Blitz reported the untimely death of Bakersfield Blitz Fullback/Linebacker Julian Yearwood. Yearwood, 31, who collapsed on the team bench during the Saturday game against the Wichita Stealth at Kansas Coliseum in Wichita, Kansas. Emergency medical personnel worked on resuscitating Yearwood for over 20 minutes before he was taken off the field on a stretcher.

He was transported by ambulance to Via Christi St. Francis Hospital where he was pronounced dead at 9:37 p.m. CT on July 19, 2003. His body was transported to the Sedgwick County Coroner's office to have an autopsy performed to determine the cause of death.

The passing of Yearwood rocked the AF2 family. The game was tied 7-7 in the first quarter when Yearwood came out of the game after blocking a field goal allegedly claiming that he was not well. He collapsed on the field shortly thereafter.

The league declined to comment on the cause of death, pending an official autopsy, though some reports in the local media indicated it may be heart related.

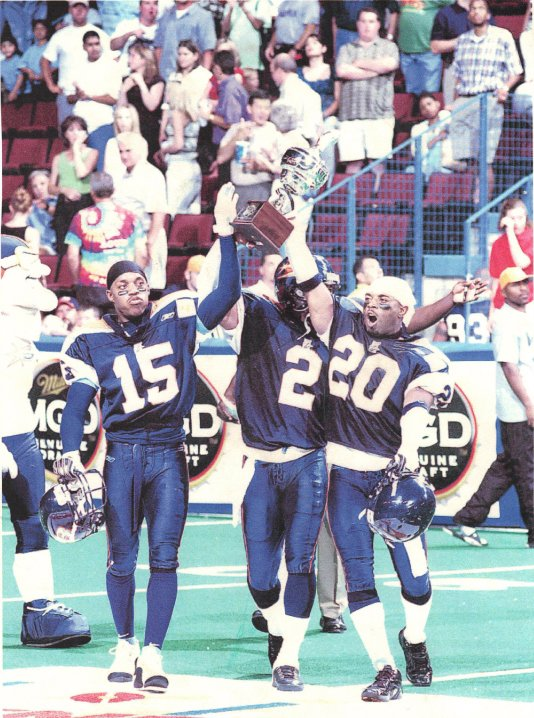
Championship Trophy

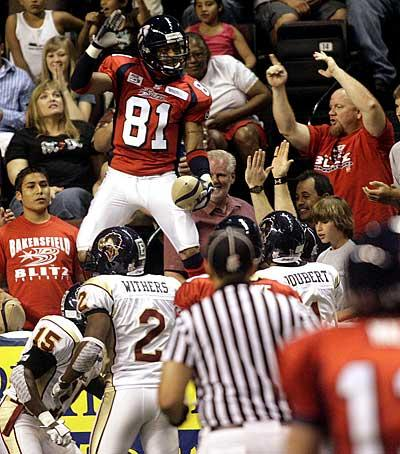
Rennard Reynolds

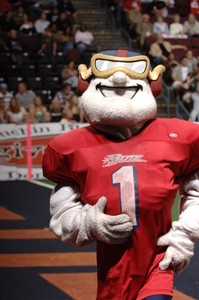
Crusher the Mascot

== Season-by-season ==
ArenaCup Champions	ArenaCup Appearances	Division champions	Playoff berth

Season	League	Conference	Division	Regular season			Postseason results
Season	League	Conference	Division	Finish	Wins	Losses	Postseason results
Bakersfield Blitz
2004	AF2	National	Western	1st	11	5	Lost NC Semifinals (Peoria 38-36)
2005	AF2	National	Western	4th	6	10	
2006	AF2	National	Western	3rd	9	7	Won NC Round 1 (Central Valley 45-37); Lost NC Semifinals (Spokane 50-47)
2007	AF2	American	West	7th	6	10	
Total					32	32	(includes only regular season)
Total					1	2	(includes only the postseason)
Total					33	34	(includes both regular season and postseason)

== Rape Allegations ==
While in Boise, Idaho playing the Boise Burn, two members were arrested and charged with crimes related to the July 8, 2007 rape of a young woman in a hotel room in Boise. The players arrested were Maurice Ronald Troutman, 25 and Rennard Reynolds, 30 both of Long Beach, California. Boise police arrested Troutman on July 8, for the alleged rape and Reynolds on July 9, for an alleged burglary connected to the alleged rape. The Blitz team cooperated with Boise police and delayed leaving Boise until the investigation was completed.

Maurice Troutman's rape case was overturned by the Supreme Court. Documents show he never wanted to or tried to take advantage of the woman. Court documents also show she never was tested to see if she had taken Ambien and Alcohol. In Idaho it is illegal to engage in sexual intercourse with someone under the influence of alcohol, drugs etc., because they cannot give consent while having these things in their system; which was why he was charged in the first place.
