= Chris Siegfried =

American football coach

Career information
- College: Millersville

Career history

Coaching
- Cape Fear Wildcats (2002–2004) Head coach; South Georgia Wildcats (2005) Head coach; Spokane Shock (2006) Head coach; Kansas City Brigade (2007) Offensive coordinator; Arkansas Twisters (2008–2009) Head coach; Jacksonville Sharks (2010) Offensive coordinator; Pittsburgh Power (2011–2012) Head coach; West Texas Desert Hawks (2024)

Operations
- National Arena League (2016) Director of football operations; National Arena League (2017–2023) Commissioner

Awards and highlights
- ArenaCup VII champion (2006)

Head coaching record
- Regular season: 90–59 (.604)

Chris Siegfried is an American football coach and administrator. He was previously the offensive coordinator of the Jacksonville Sharks (2010) and Kansas City Brigade (2007), teams in the Arena Football League, the head coach of the Spokane Shock (2006), the South Georgia Wildcats (2005), and the West Texas Desert Hawks (2024), and the Cape Fear Wildcats (2002–2004) and Arkansas Twisters of the af2. While at Spokane, he led the first-year expansion team to a 14–2 regular season record and the ArenaCup Championship.

== Biography ==
On September 15, 2010, he was named the first head coach of the expansion Pittsburgh Power of the Arena Football League. He led the Power to a 9–9 inaugural season, and after a 2–8 start in 2012 he was fired.

On June 30, 2016, Siegfried was named the first director of football operations for the new National Arena League. In October 2017, he was named the commissioner of the NAL for its second season.

In 2024, Siegfried left the NAL and joined the West Texas Warbirds, who rebranded as the West Texas Desert Hawks for legal reasons, as their head coach. The Desert Hawks were among three teams who moved from the NAL to a revival of the Arena Football League for the 2024 season. Siegfried was fired from his coaching position June 9 without any public announcement, nine days before the Desert Hawks themselves quietly suspended operations.
