= Alabama Steeldogs =

Arena football team

Logo

General information
- Founded: 2000
- Folded: 2007
- Headquartered: BJCC Arena in Birmingham, Alabama
- Colors: Black, orange, white

Personnel
- Owners: Scott Myers; Buddy King
- CEO: Buddy King
- Head coach: Ron Selesky

Team history
- Birmingham Steeldogs (2000–2006); Alabama Steeldogs (2007)

Home fields
- Birmingham Jefferson Convention Center (2000–2007)

League / conference affiliations
- AF2 (2000–2007): National Conference (2000–2002); American Conference (2003–2006); National Conference (2007); South Central Division (2001); Southern Division (2002–2006); South Division (2007)

Playoff appearances (4)
- 2001, 2002, 2004, 2007

The Alabama Steeldogs, originally known as the Birmingham Steeldogs, were incorporated in 2000 as one of the charter teams in the AF2, the developmental league of the Arena Football League. Entering their eighth season as of 2007, they were the longest running of many professional football franchises in the city of Birmingham. Management announced that it would not field a team in 2008 but had hopes of returning in 2009. But the team's front office has since been dissolved, and with no announcements of further plans, the team is defunct.

The team's first head coach was former University of Alabama standout Bobby Humphrey. In October 2005, Ron Selesky, formerly of the Arena Football League's Columbus Destroyers, Carolina Cobras and Tampa Bay Storm, as well as the AF2's Albany Conquest and Louisville Fire, was hired as the team's second coach.

The team played its home games at the Birmingham Jefferson Convention Complex Arena in downtown Birmingham. The arena was the site of the first AF2 game in 2000, between the Steeldogs and the Tennessee Valley Vipers, based in Huntsville, Alabama.

The team's colors were black, orange, and white. The team's name — unique in all of sports — paid tribute to Birmingham's steel industry.

The team's logo, depicting a dog with a spiked collar and metal lower jaw, represents "Rusty", the team's mascot. The team's cheerleaders were known as the "Showsteelers."

== Team history ==
=== Beginnings ===
On April 20, 1999, Birmingham's franchise was one of the charter teams in the Xtreme Football League, which soon brokered a deal with the more-established Arena Football League to form the latter's second tier. Christened "Arena Football 2" or "AF2" for short, the new league would play by the same rules patented by its parent organization.

After a contest, the team became the "Steeldogs", paying homage to the steel industry that helped grow the city into an industrial giant during the early 20th century.

At a press conference on August 12, 1999, the team's name, logo, colors and head coach were all introduced. Humphrey, the University of Alabama's second all-time leading rusher, would be the team's first coach.

The first Steeldogs ownership group, consisting of Charles Felix, David Berkman and Bruce Burge, also owned the Birmingham Bulls hockey franchise. Both teams were to compete and be headquartered at the Birmingham Jefferson Convention Complex in downtown Birmingham.

On January 11, 2000, the Commissioner of the AF2, Mary Ellen Garling announced the league would kick off its inaugural season at the BJCC Arena on March 31, 2000. The Steeldogs first opponent would be the Tennessee Valley Vipers, Birmingham's neighbor 100 miles to the north in Huntsville.

=== First season (2000) ===
The inaugural game was played before 14,831 fans and a regional television audience in the BJCC Arena on March 31, 2000. The game was a tremendous hit and is ranked 3rd in the league's largest regular season crowds. The scoreboard, as is typical in arena football, got quite a workout. Tennessee Valley won the first game in the series, 59-18.

Birmingham's first win came one week later at the BJCC, as the Steeldogs shut down the Greensboro Prowlers 18-7 in one of the lowest scoring games in the history of arena football.

Birmingham would finish the year with a 7-9 final record. In addition to the win over the Prowlers, Birmingham racked up victories over Roanoke (twice), Richmond, Tallahassee, Arkansas and Tulsa. The Steeldogs’ win over Tallahassee, an 86-74 barnburner, still ranks as the fourth-highest scoring game in AF2 history.

By the end of the first season, 71,402 fans had crossed the turnstiles.

=== Second season (2001) ===
The second season of Steeldogs football brought the team's second ownership group. Steve and Kathryn Umberger purchased the team on December 13, 2000. The couple also purchased the AF2's Jacksonville Tomcats in the same year, but he decided that Birmingham would be his more "hands-on" investment. Humphrey was retained as the team's head coach for a second season.

The league expanded nearly twofold in 2001 as 28 teams took the field in 2001. Birmingham opened their season at the CenturyTel Center in Bossier City, La., against the expansion Bossier City BattleWings. Birmingham won a thrilling overtime affair, 63-57. It was the first of three consecutive wins to open the 2001 season.

The Steeldogs finished the regular-season 12-4, earning them their first postseason trip. Birmingham traveled to Richmond, Virginia to face the Richmond Speed on July 21, 2001. Despite reaching the 60-point plateau, a feat that Coach Humphrey stressed in every game, the Steeldogs collapsed in the fourth quarter and fell 67-60.

2002 was the beginning of years of stability in the executive office. The Umbergers sold the franchise to two local men, both of whom were well-acquainted with Birmingham's professional sports history. Buddy King and Scott Myers became the majority and minority owners of the team on January 2, 2002. The two had met when King played with and Myers marketed for the Birmingham Fire of the World League of American Football. The pair was anxious to parlay the Steeldogs’ early success into a third season. They retained Humphrey for a third year.

=== Third season (2002) ===
Adopting the motto "One Team, One Goal", Birmingham set out to make a playoff run in their third season. After an early loss at Tulsa, Birmingham rebounded to win eight of their next nine games before dropping three of their next four. The Steeldogs ended the regular-season with an 11-5 record, good enough to earn a trip to Huntsville to face the Vipers in the first round of the playoffs at the Von Braun Center in Huntsville. There the 'Dogs cast off three years of frustration at the hands of their fiercest rival, dominating Tennessee Valley in a 65-51 victory. Almost secondary to the outcome of the game was the fact that the Steeldogs had now earned themselves a trip to Tulsa, Oklahoma, for a second-round match-up against the top-ranked team in AF2.

On August 10, 2002 Birmingham pulled off the biggest upset in team history. The Steeldogs thoroughly dominated the league's top-ranked team, handing them their first home loss in 18 games (a streak that started in 2000 with a seven-point victory over Birmingham) and also exacting revenge for the team's opening night loss. The Steeldogs returned home to host the Peoria Pirates in the National Conference Championship game on August 17, 2002, the winner of which would host the ArenaCup. But the Pirates surprised the Steeldogs with a first-half offensive clinic on their way to a 79-33 victory. The game enjoyed the 4th largest playoff attendance in league history.

The 2002 off-season was much less chaotic than in previous years as Humphrey was retained once again and, for the first time in team history, so was the ownership group.

=== Fourth season (2003) ===
Injuries plagued the 2003 edition of the Birmingham Steeldogs, as the team struggled to field a healthy and consistent quarterback. After two early season victories at home, the Steeldogs fell at Macon in the first road contest of the year. The team dropped four of their next five games, with the one bright exception being a 38-35 overtime victory over the Florida Firecats at Fort Myers.

After three straight victories in the middle of the season, the team dropped five of the last six games to close out the year. Injuries riddled the team from the offensive line, to the quarterback position, to wide receivers and defensive backs. Humphrey and his team limped into the off-season, where he was rewarded for his efforts with his fourth contract extension. He was about to become the longest-tenured coach in the history of AF2 football.

=== Fifth season (2004) ===
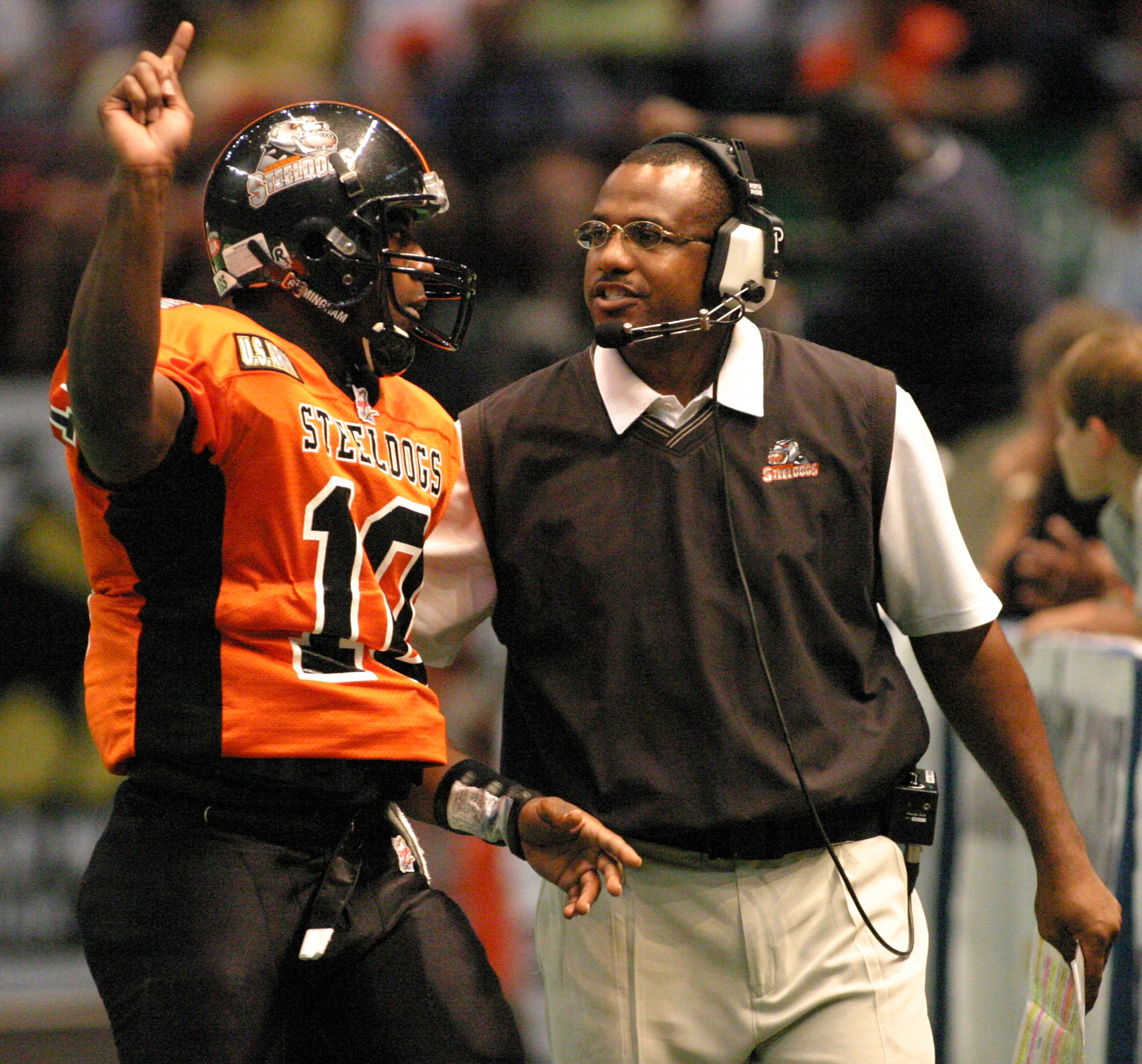
Quarterback Jeff Aaron and then-head coach Bobby Humphrey

The Steeldogs rebounded nicely to begin the 2004 season. After an opening-night loss at Bossier City, a game in which the Steeldogs’ starting quarterback was hurt on the first play of the second half, Birmingham reeled off six straight victories on the arm of backup quarterback Jeff Aaron. But inconsistency at the quarterback position, along with several key injuries cooled the Steeldogs in the second half of the 2004 regular-season. Birmingham limped into the postseason with a 10-6 record, falling in the first round at Cape Fear, North Carolina, 54-53.

Humphrey and the King-Myers ownership combo stuck around for 2005. Humphrey, who had been inducted into the Alabama Sports Hall of Fame, had become the AF2's all-time winningest coach in 2004. The team's 59-58 win over the Rio Grande Valley Dorados on June 26, 2004 gave Humphrey his 47th victory, making him tops among all current and prior head coaches through the 2004 season.

=== Sixth season (2005) ===
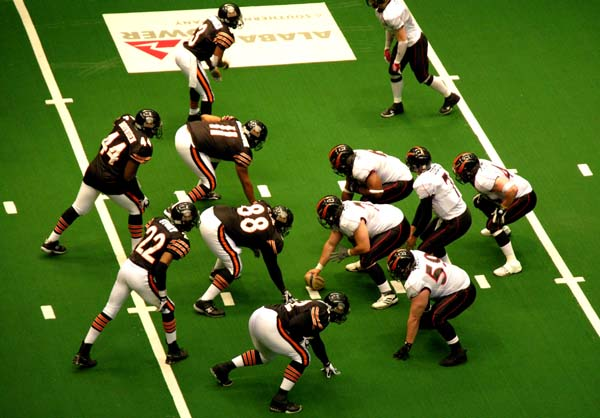
Playing defense against Louisville in May 2006 at the BJCC Arena.

The Steeldogs kicked off the 2005 regular season with a marquee player signing. Andrew Zow, the all-time leading passer at the University of Alabama, joined the team on March 15, 2005. He had signed with the team in 2004 for one game as an emergency quarterback at the behest of Coach Humphrey, but did not see any action. He had not competed on a regular basis since his senior year at Alabama in 2001 and did not see action in the team's first game, a home loss to the San Diego Riptide, but finally took the field a week later at Macon. Zow was remarkably efficient in his first contest, finishing 20 of 36 for 273 yards, three touchdowns and one interception. He also ran for a touchdown. Zow's season ended a week later when he suffered a leg injury in the following week's game at home versus the eventual league champion Memphis Xplorers.

Much like Zow's arena football career, the 2005 Steeldogs season never fully got off the ground. The quarterback position changed hands six times during the year. The offensive and defensive lines, hampered by injuries dating back to early season workout camps, never quite jelled into a functioning unit. The defense allowed an average of nearly 56 points per game, worst in the league. The Steeldogs finished with a 2-14 record, dead last in the AF2. The lowly record cost Humphrey his job; he was relieved of his coaching duties on August 9, 2005. Humphrey finished his six-year career as the longest-tenured coach in the league's history, as well as its second-most victorious.

=== Seventh season (2006) ===
On October 4, 2005, Ron Selesky was selected as the second head coach in the history of the Birmingham Steeldogs. He led the team to an improved 7-9 mark in the 2006 season, good for fourth place in the Southern Division. Birmingham lost both games played to the Tennessee Valley Vipers in 2006, accounting for two of the Vipers' three overall wins.

On December 11, 2006, the Steeldogs' management team changed the team's name from the Birmingham Steeldogs to the Alabama Steeldogs, in an effort to broaden the team's appeal to the city's more-affluent suburbs and exurbs. The only change to the team logo was replacing the word "Birmingham" with "Alabama."

=== Eighth season (2007) ===
The Steeldogs struggled again, but managed to make the playoffs with a 7-9 record and third place in the division. They lost to Rio Grande Valley in the first round of the playoffs.

After the end of the season, Selesky resigned to move up a level in arena football, taking the position of defensive coordinator and player personnel director of the Grand Rapids Rampage.

== Team deactivated ==
On October 26, 2007, owner/managing partner Scott Myers announced that the Steeldogs had collapsed and would not put a team on the field in the 2008 season. Myers had been seeking anyone to help finance the team, but was not able to find one. Myers had guaranteed that the team would return for the 2009 season. But those promises did not come to fruition.

== Results by season ==
ArenaCup Champions	ArenaCup Appearance	Division Champions	Playoff berth

Season	League	Conference	Division	Regular season			Postseason results
Season	League	Conference	Division	Finish	Wins	Losses	Postseason results
Birmingham Steeldogs
2000	AF2	National		5th	7	9	
2001	AF2	National	South Central	2nd	12	4	Lost NC Round 1 (Richmond 67-60)
2002	AF2	National	Southern	2nd	11	5	Won NC Round 1 (Tennessee Valley 65-51); Won NC Semifinals (Tulsa 53-34); Lost NC Championship (Peoria 79-33)
2003	AF2	American	Southern	4th	7	9	
2004	AF2	American	Southern	2nd	10	6	Lost AC Round 1 (Cape Fear 54-53)
2005	AF2	American	Southern	5th	2	14	
2006	AF2	American	Southern	4th	7	9	
Alabama Steeldogs
2007	AF2	National	South	3rd	7	9	Lost NC Round 1 (Rio Grande Valley 44-41)
Total					63	65	(includes only regular season)
Total					2	4	(includes only the postseason)
Total					65	69	(includes both regular season and postseason)

== Notable players ==
Several former Steeldogs have gone on to be players in other professional leagues. Four players went to the National Football League: Brian Holmes (Atlanta, Tennessee), Brian Haugabrook (Cleveland), Detronn Harris (Carolina) and Erick Harris (Philadelphia). In addition to the NFL, ten players were signed to AFL teams: Bobby Keyes (Dallas), Terrell Browden (Colorado), James Clark (Georgia), Jerry Turner (Las Vegas), William Mayes (Las Vegas), Herman Bell (Detroit) and Ernest Ross (Detroit). Three players also played in the Canadian Football League: Aryvia Holmes (Montreal), Bennitte Waddell (British Columbia) and Michael Gholar (Saskatchewan).
