= Isaac Morales (American football) =

American football player (born 1983)

No. 66
- Position: Offensive lineman

Personal information
- Born: December 29, 1983 (age 42); Canyon, Texas, U.S.
- Listed height: 6 ft 6 in (1.98 m)
- Listed weight: 325 lb (147 kg)

Career information
- High school: Canyon (TX)
- College: Wyoming
- NFL draft: 2005: undrafted

Career history
- Arkansas Twisters (2009); Jacksonville Sharks (2010–2013); Portland Thunder (2014)*; Jacksonville Sharks (2014)
- * Offseason or practice squad member only

Awards and highlights
- ArenaBowl champion (2011)

Career AFL statistics
- Receptions: 6
- Receiving yards: 45
- Receiving TDs: 4
- Tackles: 4
- Stats at ArenaFan.com

Isaac Morales (born December 29, 1983) is an American former football offensive lineman who is currently a varsity offensive line football coach at Allen D. Nease High School. He played guard for the University of Wyoming.

== Professional career ==
=== Jacksonville Sharks ===
He was signed as an undrafted free agent by the Jacksonville Sharks in 2010. On May 10, 2012, Morales returned to the Sharks.

=== Portland Thunder ===
On December 20, 2013, Morales was selected by the Portland Thunder during the 2014 AFL Expansion Draft.

=== Return to Jacksonville ===
On May 15, 2014, Morales was assigned to the Sharks.
