= Clewiston High School =

Location
- 1501 South Francisco Street; Clewiston, Florida 33440; United States; 26°44′28″N 80°55′25″W

Information
- School type: public, high school
- Established: 1938
- School district: Hendry County Schools
- NCES District ID: 1200780
- Superintendent: Michael Swindle
- NCES School ID: 120078002663
- Principal: Philip Summers
- Teaching staff: 35.00 (on full-time equivalent (FTE) basis)
- Grades: 9—12
- Gender: coed
- Enrollment: 958 (2022-23)
- Student to teacher ratio: 27.37
- Campus type: rural
- Colors: Blue; Gold
- Nickname: Tigers
- Website: chs.hendry-schools.org

Clewiston High School in Clewiston, Florida is one of two public high schools of the Hendry County Schools system. Clewiston High School, home of the Tigers, is a small, rural school in South Central Florida on the Southern border of Lake Okeechobee.

A small pre-kindergarten program is also operated at this school for the children of current CHS students.

== Students ==
The student body was 51.5% female and 48.5% male in 2013–14. The racial breakdown was:Hispanic-52.0%, Black-23.3%, White-23.3%, Asian/Pacific islanders-0.8 %, Multiracial-0.5% and Native American/Alaskan-0.3%. According to the NCES, 72.2% of the students were eligible for free or reduced lunch.

According to the U.S. News & World Report for the 2009–2010 school year, Clewiston High School is a Title I funds-receiving school, with 63% of its student body considered "economically disadvantaged". Clewiston High School offers Advanced Placement courses, which approximately 30% of its students take. Students also have the opportunity to dual-enroll with Palm Beach State College, Florida SouthWestern State College (formerly Edison State College), or Florida Gulf Coast University. Through this program, all expenses are paid for through the school district. When calculating the letter grade for the schools, dual-enrollment and AP enrollment numbers are included.

== Athletics ==
Clewiston High School offers ten sport programs to their students; these include: Football, Basketball, Track, Cross Country, Soccer, Wrestling, Baseball, Softball, Volleyball, and Golf. Nine school clubs are also available for students to join.

== Notable alumni ==
- Steffon Bradford – American basketball player
- Randy Dixon – American football player
- Titus Dixon - American football player
- Reggie Freeman – American football player
- Glenn Glass – American football player
- Eric Green – American football player
- Alfonso Marshall – American football player
- Dan Miller – American football player
- Quorey Payne - American football player
- Ja'Markis Weston – American football player
