= New Orleans VooDoo =

Arena football team

- Current season
- Logo
- Uniforms

General information
- Founded: 2003
- Folded: 2015
- Headquartered: New Orleans, Louisiana at the Smoothie King Center
- Colors: Purple, red, black, tan, white
- Mascot: Bones & Mojo

Personnel
- Owner: Arena Football League
- CEO: TBA
- General manager: TBA
- Head coach: Dean Cokinos
- President: TBA

Team history
- First franchise; New Orleans VooDoo (2004–2005, 2007–2008); Second franchise; Bossier City Battle Wings (2001–2003); Bossier–Shreveport Battle Wings (2004–2010); New Orleans VooDoo (2011–2015)

Home fields
- Smoothie King Center (2004–2005, 2007–2008, 2011–2015); Mercedes-Benz Superdome (2013)

League / conference affiliations
- First franchise: Arena Football League (2004–2005, 2007–2008): National Conference (2004–2005, 2007–2008); Southern Division (2004–2005, 2007–2008); Second franchise: (as the Battle Wings from 2001 to 2010) af2 (2001–2009): National Conference (2001–2003); American Conference (2004); National Conference (2005–2009); South Central Division (2001); Central Division (2002); Southern Division (2003); Midsouthern Division (2004); Midwestern Division (2005–2006); Southwest Division (2007–2009); Arena Football League (2010–2015): American Conference (2010–2015); Southwest Division (2010); South (2011–2014); East (2015)

Championships
- Division championships: 3: Southern: 2004; Southwestern (af2): 2008, 2009

Playoff appearances (6)
- af2: 2007, 2008, 2009; AFL: 2004, 2008, 2012

The New Orleans VooDoo were a professional arena football team based in New Orleans, Louisiana. They were members of the Arena Football League (AFL) from 2004 to 2015.

The VooDoo were the second AFL team to play in New Orleans, the New Orleans Night, who had competed in the 1991 and 1992 AFL seasons in the Louisiana Superdome, one of the few stadiums capable of a full-size football surface to host arena football. In contrast to the Night, the VooDoo played their home games in both of their incarnations at the Smoothie King Center.

The original New Orleans VooDoo played in the AFL from 2004 to 2008, at which point the league suspended operations. During that time they were owned in part by Tom Benson, who also owned the National Football League's New Orleans Saints. At the completion of the 2008 season, VooDoo owner Tom Benson announced the disbanding of the VooDoo. This led to the termination of operations for the AFL and ultimate filing by the League of Chapter 11 Bankruptcy. The minor league affiliate of the AFL, af2, continued play through the 2009 season.

In the fall of 2009, several af2 owners, Paul Ross of the Tulsa Talons, Dan Newman of the Bossier-Shreveport Battle Wings, and Brady Nelson of the Spokane Shock, spearheaded in conjunction with Brett Bouchy, former owner of the AFL's Arizona Rattlers and Orlando Predators, a move to purchase the assets of the AFL out of Bankruptcy. This successful transaction resulted in the reformation of the AFL for the 2010 season. Prior to the 2010 season, the af2 league terminated operations. Several af2 teams chose to move into the AFL, including the Talons, BattleWings, Iowa Barnstormers, Spokane Shock, Tennessee Valley Vipers, and Boise Burn. Prior to the 2011 AFL season, several AFL teams relocated: The Talons moved from Tulsa to San Antonio; the Vipers moved from Huntsville, Alabama to Atlanta, Georgia, and reactivated the Georgia Force; the BattleWings left Bossier City for New Orleans and reactivated the New Orleans VooDoo. Legendary AFL player/coach Derek Stingley coached the VooDoo for the 2011 season and was replaced in 2012 by longtime AFL quarterback and coach Pat O'Hara. In 2015, the VooDoo's final season, Dean Cokinos was the head coach. At the completion of the 2015 season, the New Orleans VooDoo ceased operations.

The VooDoo's official mascots were known as Bones and Mojo. Their cheerleaders were known as the VooDoo Dolls.

A new version known as the Louisiana VooDoo made an effort to revive the brand in the 2024 reboot of the AFL but was unable to secure a home in New Orleans, Bossier City or Lake Charles; the team would instead play only two games, its lone home game at Blackham Coliseum in Lafayette, before folding due to issues with league finances.

== History ==
=== Franchise is born ===
In 1998, New Orleans Saints owner Tom Benson committed to the purchase of an Arena Football League (AFL) team, making him the first National Football League (NFL) owner to do so. On March 7, 2002, Benson announced that he would be fielding a franchise in 2003. However, the VooDoo played their inaugural game on the road against the Philadelphia Soul on February 8, 2004. The game marked the return of the AFL to New Orleans, where the New Orleans Night franchise had played two seasons in 1991–1992. The VooDoo logo consists of a human skull wearing a top hat and sunglasses.

In their first year, they drew big crowds to their home games as they became the second team other than the Orlando Predators or Tampa Bay Storm to win the AFL's Southern Division. The team's average attendance of 15,240 ranked fifth in the league and was a major factor in the VooDoo's 7–1 regular season home record.

In 2005, the team started strong, but later found itself on the wrong end of some close, hard-fought games. At a sold-out TD Waterhouse Centre, the VooDoo ended their second regular season against Orlando with both needing a win to reach the playoffs. A second-half rally featuring a fumble return for a touchdown by Thabiti Davis brought the VooDoo back into the game briefly, but a Jay Taylor kickoff hit the iron surrounding the nets and was recovered by the Predators. After another touchdown to bring the lead up to 15, the game was effectively over. The final score was 51–40, ending the VooDoo's season at 9–7.

Despite the underachievement, the VooDoo had an average attendance of 15,338, good for third in the 17-team AFL, and again had the New Orleans market lead the nation in television ratings for Sunday AFL broadcasts on NBC.

The VooDoo's success and popularity led the AFL to consider placing the ArenaBowl in New Orleans. Although it had already signed a deal with Las Vegas to have the ArenaBowl there for 2005, 2006 and 2007, the league had considered terminating that deal. Had the bidding for ArenaBowl XX begun, New Orleans would have been an early favorite, along with Orlando and Arizona.

=== Hurricane Katrina ===
On August 28, 2005, it was announced that due to the extensive damage suffered by Hurricane Katrina to the New Orleans Arena, the VooDoo would suspend operations for the 2006 season. Fifteen of the players under contract with the VooDoo were moved to the expansion Kansas City Brigade for the 2006 season.

=== Return in 2007 ===
In 2007, the VooDoo returned with Mike Neu as the head coach. The team set an AFL season ticket record, selling over 13,000 season tickets. This led to the VooDoo leading in announced attendance as well, drawing 16,645 to their eight home games, 800 more than the second-place Philadelphia Soul.

The VooDoo started 4–3, before a seven-game losing streak dropped them to 4–10 and eliminated them from the playoff race.

The final record of 5–11 included the first ever victory by the VooDoo over the Orlando Predators, a dominating 67–54 victory over the eventual ArenaBowl XXI champion San Jose SaberCats, a 78–34 nationally televised defeat at the Philadelphia Soul that ranks as the worst loss in franchise history, a 69–63 nationally televised loss to the New York Dragons where the VooDoo used some curious strategy to run the clock down before going for the winning score on fourth down, and a narrow 80–79 defeat at the Dallas Desperados, in which the VooDoo missed a two-point conversion to try to win the game after regulation time expired.

Despite the terrible record, several players were revelations for the VooDoo. Steve Bellisari, a former Ohio State quarterback, took over the starting job from AFL veteran Andy Kelly; the VooDoo offense became more efficient later in the season. Jonathan Ruffin, a New Orleans native and former Lou Groza award winner, took over kicking duties late in the season and was far more efficient than his predecessor Eric Houle. James Lynch was named to the All-Rookie team at fullback.

=== 2008 ===
The VooDoo were picked by prognosticators to bring up the rear of the AFL after free agent WR Derrick Lewis was injured in training camp. By losing the first game in Los Angeles, and having starting Quarterback Steve Bellisari get hurt, things started to look bleak for the VooDoo. Backup quarterback Danny Wimprine, from the New Orleans area, took over, and led by a defense that threatened to shatter the AFL record for interceptions in a season, the VooDoo won seven of their next eight games and threatened to run away with the Southern Division. The VooDoo then suffered a collapse, losing six of their last seven games, and missed the Arena Football playoffs for the third consecutive season, finishing 8–8. Speculation ensued about Mike Neu's job as head coach, as the VooDoo suffered four second-half-of-the-season collapses in their four years as a franchise, but early indications were that he would continue to be the coach in 2009.

The New Orleans VooDoo received the Arena Football League's Best Support Staff Award during the ArenaBall Awards Ceremony held in New Orleans on Friday, July 25, 2008.

On October 13, 2008, owner Tom Benson announced the New Orleans VooDoo would not be continuing operations in New Orleans. Reasons given were "circumstances affecting the league and the team." The league would itself go bankrupt not long afterward.

=== Rebirth Of the VooDoo ===
The Arena Football League announced that they would revive the New Orleans VooDoo for the 2010 season. On September 14, 2010, Nakia Hogan of the New Orleans Times-Picayune reported that the Bossier-Shreveport franchise would move their operation to the city of New Orleans. Jason Coffel, who would serve as the vice president of operations for the VooDoo, said owner Dan Newman would cease operations of the Battle Wings in the Bossier-Shreveport City area and immediately become the New Orleans VooDoo. "The reason this is happening is the Arena Football League recognizes how passionate the New Orleans market is about football", Coffel said. "Proof of that is the success of the Saints and the success of the VooDoo when they were around." The rebirth of the franchise and its renewal would not be affiliated with previous owner of the Voodoo, Tom Benson, or the New Orleans Saints.

During the 2011 season, after a home loss to the Spokane Shock, the VooDoo fired head coach Derek Stingley on June 26, 2011. He was replaced by General Manager Jon Norris. At the end of a 3–15 season, Jon Norris went back to being the General Manager. Later on August 8, 2011, he hired Pat O'Hara as the VooDoo's third head coach.

The VooDoo started the 2012 season losing their first two games at home, to the Philadelphia Soul and Milwaukee Mustangs. This brought their home losing streak to 12, dating back to 2008, and concerned fans who did not want a possible AFL record set for futility. However, the VooDoo recovered, and gave fans starved for a winner something to hope for. Aided by a South Division where no team pulled away, a three-game winning streak, including an emotional victory over the Jacksonville Sharks put the VooDoo in first place heading into the final month of the regular season. Unfortunately, the VooDoo dropped their last three games including an overtime loss to the Tampa Bay Storm 78–77. The team backed into the playoffs with the Tampa Bay Storm losing to the Spokane Shock in the final week. The VooDoo however, fell the following week in the conference semifinals to the Philadelphia Soul, 66–53.

The VooDoo started 2013 off with a dramatic overtime win over the conference rival Orlando Predators. However, as the season progressed, inconsistent play from the offensive line led to injuries and ineffectiveness from starting quarterback Kurt Rocco, while the VooDoo struggled to replace star linebacker Alvin Ray Jackson and defensive back Jeremy Kellem. The record dropped as low as 1–8, but Rocco's return to health has seen the VooDoo start to play better at the right time, in a conference where they never really dropped out of the race for a playoff spot. Chris Dixon took over as starting QB and led the VooDoo to 4 wins in their final 9 games, leading to a win-and-you're-in playoff scenario for the final regular season game at Orlando. Unfortunately, the VooDoo lost 71–42 and finished their season 5–13.

2014 featured the much-ballyhooed signing of former LSU quarterback Ryan Perriloux, but Rocco was named the starter again after training camp. As the season started, injuries led to both seeing playing time early, but a poor 1–5 start has hurt the team's playoff chances. However, the one win was against the rival Orlando Predators, and L. J. Castile has become one of the top receivers in the league.

After compiling a 16–38 in three seasons as head coach, O'Hara was not offered a new contract for 2015. The VooDoo instead announced the hiring of Alabama Hammers Head Coach, Dean Cokinos.

=== League takeover ===
On July 12, 2015, ArenaFan.com reported that the VooDoo and the Las Vegas Outlaws were to be taken over by the league due to poor attendance and financial issues. Both teams were expected to finish the season, then commissioner Scott Butera was to conduct a search for new owners. An unnamed investment group reportedly sought to purchase the VooDoo and move the franchise to Texas and attended the VooDoo's final home game at Smoothie King Arena against the Tampa Bay Storm on July 18, 2015. That game was possibly the final home game for this franchise. The game with the Outlaws was cancelled and declared to be a tie, only the third such result in league history and the first resulting from a scheduled game having not actually been played. Following a league takeover of the team on July 15, 2015, on August 9, 2015, the Arena Football League announced that the New Orleans VooDoo "have ceased operations effective immediately." It was also reported that the VooDoo could come back for the 2016 season with a new ownership group.

=== 2024 revival as the Louisiana VooDoo ===
In an interview with ArenaFan.com, published in February 2023, AFL Commissioner Lee A. Hutton initially that there have been discussions with potential ownership groups in New Orleans to relaunch the VooDoo when the league resumes play in 2024. Louisiana was among the regions named by Hutton in a July 2023 announcement of the league's inaugural locations. After Bossier City ruled itself out due to schedule conflicts, contemporary reports indicated that the league was aiming to instead put the team in Lake Charles, Louisiana. The new team, which retained the VooDoo name (as the Louisiana VooDoo), was unveiled on November 3, 2023. Though, this version is not directly tied to the original New Orleans VooDoo.

== Notable players ==
=== Individual awards ===
AFL Ironman of the Year
Season	Player	Position
2011	P. J. Berry	WR/KR

=== All-Arena players ===
The following VooDoo players were named to All-Arena Teams:

- FB/LB Dan Curran (1)
- OL/DL Tim Martin (1), B. J. Cohen (1)
- LB Norman LeJeune (1), Alvin Ray Jackson (1)
- DB Jeremy Kellem (1), Cameron McGlenn (1)
- KR P. J. Berry (1), Larry Beavers (1)

=== All-Ironman players ===
The following VooDoo players were named to All-Ironman Teams:

- FB/LB Dan Curran (1)
- OL/DL B. J. Cohen (1)
- WR/KR P. J. Berry (1)

=== All-Rookie players ===
The following Battle Wings/VooDoo players were named to All-Rookie Teams:

- FB James Lynch
- OL/DL Mike Landry
- LB Norman LeJeune
- DS Monty Montgomery, Alvin Porter

== Arenas ==
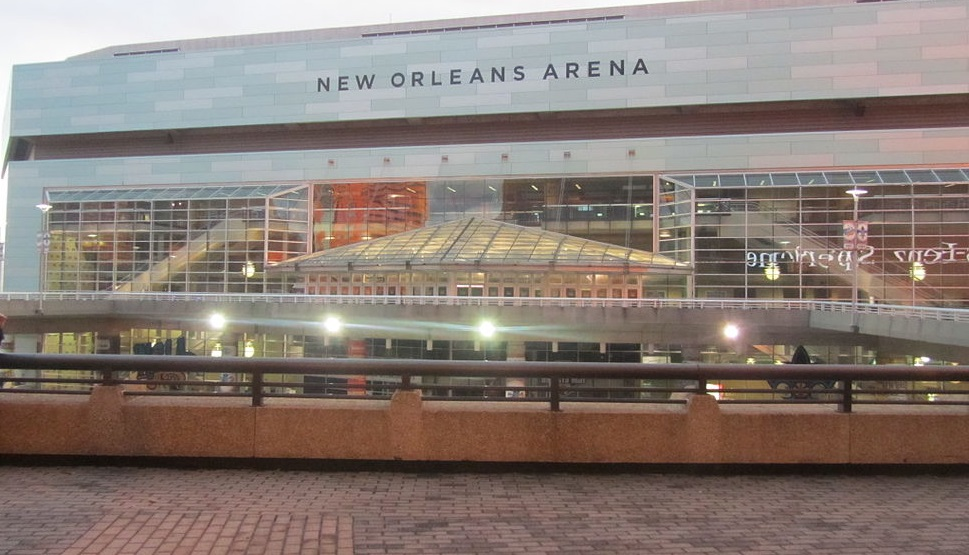
Smoothie King Center, when it was New Orleans Arena

The VooDoo played their home games in the 16,900 Smoothie King Center (formerly New Orleans Arena). The arena was also known as "The Graveyard" during Voodoo home games.

For the 2013 season, the VooDoo announced that, due to renovations at the New Orleans Arena, they would relocate to the Mercedes-Benz Superdome for the last six home games of the AFL season.

== Head coaches ==
Name	Term	Regular season				Playoffs		Awards
Name	Term	W	L	T	Win%	W	L	Awards
Mike Neu	2004–2008	33	31	0	.516	0	1	
Derek Stingley	2011	1	11	0	.083	0	0	
Jon Norris	2011	1	3	0	.250	0	0	
Pat O'Hara	2012–2014	16	36	0	.308	0	1	
Dean Cokinos	2015	3	14	1	.194	0	0	

== Season-by-season ==
ArenaBowl champions	ArenaBowl appearance	Division champions	Playoff berth

Season	League	Conference	Division	Regular season				Postseason results
Season	League	Conference	Division	Finish	Wins	Losses	Ties	Postseason results
2004	AFL	National	Southern	1st	11	5	0	Lost Quarterfinals (Colorado) 47–44
2005	AFL	National	Southern	4th	9	7	0	
2006	Suspended operations due to the effects of Hurricane Katrina							
2007	AFL	National	Southern	4th	5	11	0	
2008	AFL	National	Southern	4th	8	8	0	
2009	The AFL suspended operations for the 2009 season.							
2010	Did not play in 2010.							
2011	AFL	American	South	5th	3	15	0	
2012	AFL	American	South	3rd	8	10	0	Lost Conference Semifinals (Philadelphia) 66–53
2013	AFL	American	South	4th	5	13	0	
2014	AFL	American	South	4th	3	15	0	
2015	AFL	American	East	3rd	3	14	1	
Total					55	98	1	(includes only regular season)
Total					0	2	—	(includes only the postseason)
Total					55	100	1	(includes both regular season and postseason)
