= Boise Burn =

Arena football team

Logo

General information
- Founded: 2006
- Folded: 2009
- Headquartered: Qwest Arena in Boise, Idaho
- Colors: Orange, silver, white

Personnel
- Owner: Idaho Sports Properties
- Head coach: Lee Leslie (2007–2008); Brent Winter (2009)
- President: Eric Trapp

Team history
- Boise Burn (2007–2009)

Home fields
- Qwest Arena (2007–2009)

League / conference affiliations
- AF2 (2007–2009): American Conference (2007); West Division (2007); National Conference (2008–2009); West Division (2008–2009)

Playoff appearances (1)
- 2009

The Boise Burn was an arena football team based in Boise, Idaho. The Burn began play in the af2 league in March 2007. Burn home games were played at the Qwest Arena in downtown Boise.

== Team history ==
- June 6, 2006: af2 officials announced a Boise expansion franchise for the 2007 season
- June 28: The unnamed team announced that former Utah Blaze assistant coach Lee Leslie would serve as head coach.
- July 27: The Idaho Statesman newspaper announced a "name-the-team" contest.
- August 25: Balloting for the contest closed.
- August 27: A poll was started. The "final six" choices were:
  - Blast
  - Bruisers
  - Cutthroats
  - Rapids
  - Sawtooths
  - Wildfire
- October 10: Announced team name as the Boise Burn to pay tribute to local firefighters.
- October 25: Logo (a flaming skull clenching a football in its teeth) & colors (red, orange, and silver) released, first 4 players signed are QB Bart Hendricks, RB Lee Marks, WR Tim Gilligan, and K Dan Beardall.

== 2007 season ==
Home games are in bold

- Friday March 30: Louisville (Won 57-52)
- Friday April 13: Quad City (Lost 26-42)
- **Saturday April 21: Everett** (Won 70-34)
- **Saturday April 28: Oklahoma City** (Won 48-42)
- Saturday May 5: Bakersfield (Won 69-55)
- Saturday May 12: Central Valley (Lost 70-78)
- **Saturday May 19: Spokane** (Lost 44-62)
- **Saturday May 26: Stockton** (Lost 33-51)
- Saturday June 9: Everett (Lost 32-52)
- **Saturday June 16: Rio Grande Valley** (Lost 32-62)
- Saturday June 23: Spokane (Lost 28-60)
- **Saturday June 30: Tri-Cities** (Lost 42-55)
- **Saturday July 7: Bakersfield**(Won 47-16)
- Saturday July 14: Stockton (Won 58-46)
- **Saturday July 21: Central Valley** (Won 77-41)
- Saturday July 28: Tri-Cities (Won 52-42)

== 2008 season ==
Home games are in bold.

- April 5, 2008: Tulsa Talons-Lost (28-65)
- April 12, 2008: Stockton Lightning-Won (51-43)
- **April 19, 2008: Tri-Cities Fever-Won (74-28)**
- **April 26, 2008: Texas Copperheads-Won (41-14)**
- **May 3, 2008: Stockton Lightning-Won (77-14)**
- May 10, 2008: Spokane Shock-Lost (42-62)
- May 18, 2008: Daytona Beach Thunderbirds-Won (61-34)
- **May 24, 2008: Central Valley Coyotes-Lost (40-46)**
- May 31, 2008: Tri-Cities Fever-Lost (46-57)
- **June 7, 2008: Spokane Shock-Lost (51-68)**
- **June 14, 2008: Oklahoma City Yard Dawgz-Lost (33-51)**
- June 21, 2008: Stockton Lightning-Won (55-51)
- June 28, 2008: Tri-Cities Fever-Won (52-34)
- **July 12, 2008: Florida Firecats-Won (59-47)**
- July 19, 2008: Central Valley Coyotes-Lost (50-55)
- July 26, 2008: Spokane Shock-Lost (48-63)

== 2009 season ==
Home games are in bold.

- April 11, 2009: Bossier-Shreveport BattleWings-Won (54-45)
- **April 18, 2009: Spokane Shock-Lost (45-63)**
- April 25, 2009: Central Valley Coyotes-Won (52-45)
- **May 2, 2009: Stockton Lightning-Won (68-18)**
- May 9, 2009: Spokane Shock-Lost (62-64)
- **May 16, 2009: Tri-Cities Fever-Won (77-28)**
- May 23, 2009: Stockton Lightning-Won (59-44)
- **May 30, 2009: Amarillo Dusters-Won (51-40)**

== Notable players ==
See Category:Boise Burn players

== Season-by-season ==
Season records
Season	W	L	T	Finish	Playoff results
2007	8	8	0	4th AC West	--
2008	8	8	0	3rd NC West	--
2009	12	4	0	2nd NC West	Won NC Round 1 (Arkansas 77-36); Lost NC Semifinal (Spokane 59-35)
Totals	29	21	0		

== Suspending operations ==
On September 28, Idaho Sports Properties suspended operations in part due to a major withdrawal from the Burn's majority owner. The other owners Texas AF2 Holdings also agreed to withdraw funds from the Burn. Boise was invited to join the newly formed Arena Football 1, but even if the funding had gone forward, there would be no guarantee that Boise would join the league.

As of 2023, the Burn's intellectual properties are owned by a holding company tied to Idaho Central Arena and the Idaho Steelheads ice hockey team. In June of that year, shortly before Boise was announced as one of the 16 inaugural markets for an Arena Football League revival, the holding company renewed the Boise Burn's Web domain name. Ultimately, the Burn were not included in the 2024 Arena Football League season schedule.
