= Texas Revolution (indoor football) =

American indoor/arena football team

Logo

General information
- Founded: 2000
- Folded: 2019
- Headquartered: Frisco, Texas
- Colors: Blue, red, white
- Mascot: Alamo
- www.texasrevs.com (scrapped)

Personnel
- Owners: Championship Sports Group; Owner's Box Inc.
- CEO: Tommy Benizio
- Head coach: Victor Mann

Nicknames
- Revs, Cannons

Team history
- Arkansas Twisters (2000–2009); Arkansas Diamonds (2010); Allen Wranglers (2011–2012); Texas Revolution (2013–2019)

Home fields
- Verizon Arena (2000–2010); Allen Event Center (2011–2017); Dr Pepper Arena (2018); Ford Center at The Star (2019)

League / conference affiliations
- AF2 (2000–2009): National Conference (2000–2003, 2006–2009); South Central Division (2001); Central Division (2002–2003, 2007–2009); Midwest Division (2006); Southwest Division (2009); American Conference (2004–2005); Mid-South Division (2004); Southern Division (2005); National Conference (2006–2009); Midwest Division (2006); Central Division (2007–2009); Southwest Division (2009); Indoor Football League (2010–2014): Intense Conference (2010–2012); Lonestar East Division (2010); Lonestar Division (2011); United Conference (2013–2014); Champions Indoor Football (2015–2019): Southern Division (2016); South Conference (2017–2019)

Championships
- League championships: 1: CIF: 2017
- Conference championships: 1: CIF: 2017
- Division championships: 3: IFL: 2010, 2011 CIF: 2016

Playoff appearances (13)
- af2: 2002, 2003, 2006, 2007, 2008, 2009; IFL: 2010, 2011, 2012; CIF: 2015, 2016, 2017, 2018

The Texas Revolution were an American professional indoor football team and a founding member of Champions Indoor Football (CIF). The Revolution were based in Allen and Frisco, Texas, within the Dallas–Fort Worth metroplex.

Founded in 2000 as the Arkansas Twisters, the Little Rock-based team played 10 seasons in af2 before that league folded. The team jumped to the Indoor Football League as the Arkansas Diamonds for the 2010 season. Remaining in the IFL, the team moved to Texas to become the Allen Wranglers for the 2011 and 2012 seasons. In 2012, former NFL standout and future hall of famer Terrell Owens played eight games for the Wranglers before being cut in late May.

In 2012, the Wranglers franchise was transferred to a new ownership group and the team was renamed the Texas Revolution for the 2013 season. After five seasons in the IFL, the team moved to the Champions Indoor Football league for that circuit's inaugural season.

== History ==
=== Arkansas Twisters ===
The franchise began play as the Arkansas Twisters in 2000 as the only professional football team in the state of Arkansas. The team played 10 seasons as a charter member of af2, the "developmental" league of the original Arena Football League. The Twisters played their home games at Verizon Arena in North Little Rock, Arkansas. The team enjoyed success on the field, twice reaching the league's championship game. After the AFL took a season off and was forced into bankruptcy in 2009, the af2 was dissolved and the Twisters were announced as a planned charter member of Arena Football 1.

=== Arkansas Diamonds ===
Concerns for stability with Arena Football 1 lead to a November 2009 shift by Arkansas to the Indoor Football League. However, the rights to the Twisters name and logo belonged to Arena Football 1 so the Arkansas franchise held a "name the team" contest in late January and became the Arkansas Diamonds of the IFL's Intense Conference for the 2010 season. The new team colors for 2010 were Carolina blue, black, and gray. Arena football veteran Danton Barto took over as head coach, leading the team to an 11–3 regular season record and first place in the 2010 Lonestar East Division. The team's playoff run ended with a loss to the Billings Outlaws in the Intense Conference Finals. With the team struggling financially, co-owners Jim Smith and Jeff Everetts announced in September 2009 that the franchise was relocating to Allen, Texas, a prosperous suburb of Dallas.

=== Allen Wranglers ===
After a name-the-team contest, the team announced on September 29, 2010, it would be called the Allen Wranglers, starting with the 2011 Indoor Football League season. The relocated Intense Conference team would play their home games at the Allen Event Center in Allen, Texas. The team shared the name with a previous indoor football team in Allen, the Texas Wranglers, who played the 2009 and 2010 seasons in the Independent Indoor Football Alliance.

In October 2010, the team announced that Chris MacKeown would be the Wranglers' head coach for the 2011 season. Former Dallas Cowboys player Drew Pearson was named general manager of the franchise in early December 2010. The team finished with a 10–4 regular season record and first place in the Lonestar Division. They advanced through two rounds of the IFL playoffs before losing the Intense Conference Championship to the Tri-Cities Fever of Kennewick, Washington.

The Wranglers started the 2012 season strong under new head coach Pat Pimmell but after consecutive losses dropped their record to 5–3 in April, Pimmel was let go and the team's offensive and defensive coordinators shared the title "co-interim head coach" through the end of the season. The team finished with a 9–5 regular season record and reached the IFL playoffs but lost in the Intense Conference semi-finals to the Wichita Wild.

National attention was focused on the Wranglers in 2012 when NFL veteran wide receiver Terrell Owens joined the team. Recovering from surgery and receiving no offers from NFL teams, Owens accepted a generous contract and partial ownership in the franchise to play in Allen. He swelled attendance at Wranglers home games. His debut drew a crowd of 5,711 people, larger than the Wranglers' home attendance for the entire 2011 season, but his contract allowed him to skip many away dates. Owens was released by the Wranglers on May 29, 2012, with three games left in the season, for his "lack of effort both on and off the field", failure to show up for a scheduled appearance at a children's hospital, and refusal to play in two upcoming road games, Along with his release, Owens also relinquished his ownership stake in the team.

=== Texas Revolution ===
In June 2012, Wranglers owner Jon Frankel ceased operations of the team. The IFL then transferred franchise ownership to a new ownership group called Championship Sports Group led by CEO Tommy Benizio, the former IFL commissioner, with co-owners in Tim Brown and Ken Paxton. On September 19, 2012, the team unveiled its new name and colors as the Texas Revolution. After three seasons in the Intense Conference, the team was realigned to the United Conference for the 2013 season. In November 2012, the team named Billy Back as head coach for the 2013 season.

After a disappointing 5–9 campaign, the Revolution released head coach Billy Back and hired Chris Williams from the New Mexico Stars. The league released its 2014 schedule in late October 2013 with the Revolution staying in the United Conference but the Chicago franchise replaced by the Bemidji Axemen in the 9-team IFL. The team re-signed several key players for 2014 and, in mid-January, announced the signing of running back Jennifer Welter as the first female professional football player for a position other than kicker.

In late August 2014, the team hired former Dallas Cowboys cornerback Wendell Davis as head coach and director of football operations. Days later, the team announced it was leaving the Indoor Football League for the new Champions Indoor Football. The team's 2015 schedule began with a pre-season home game on February 27 and two regular season road games before the home opener on March 20. On March 30, after just four regular season games, the team released Wendell Davis and promoted defensive coordinator Devin Wyman to head coach. The team made its best playoff run since moving to Allen, advancing to Champions Bowl I but falling to the Sioux City Bandits, 76–61. Later that year, a team and potential regional rival called the Mesquite Marshals were launched in nearby Mesquite for the 2016 season.

In 2017, the Revolution won Champions Bowl III. The team then relocated to Frisco, Texas, and the Dr Pepper Arena for the 2018 season. On April 9, 2018, Victor Mann returned as head coach. The team finished the 2018 season 5–7 but advanced as far as the conference championship, where they lost to the eventual league champion Duke City Gladiators 41–28.

For the 2019 season, the Revolution again moved to a new arena in the Ford Center at The Star, the Dallas Cowboys' practice facility, on a three-year lease. Sometime just prior to the start of the season, a new ownership group called Owner's Box Inc obtained the majority ownership of the team, keeping Benizio as the CEO. However, after three home games into the 2019 season, the Revolution cancelled their home game scheduled for May 4. The remainder of the team's home games were then cancelled as well and the Ford Center stated that the team's games would no longer be played there. On May 9, the team announced it had ceased operations after the new ownership failed to back its financial obligations.

== Season-by-season results ==
League champions	Conference champions	Division champions	Playoff berth	League leader

Season	Team	League	Conference	Division	Regular season				Postseason results
Season	Team	League	Conference	Division	Finish	Wins	Losses	Ties	Postseason results
Arkansas Twisters
2000	2000	af2	National		6th	7	9	0	
2001	2001	af2	National	South Central	5th	6	10	0	
2002	2002	af2	National	Central	2nd	11	5	0	Lost Division Championship, 32–34 (Tulsa)
2003	2003	af2	National	Central	2nd	9	7	0	Won Wild Card Round, 36–28 (Bakersfield); Won Conference Semifinal, 63–61 (Quad City); Lost Conference Championship, 52–63 (Tulsa)
2004	2004	af2	American	Midsouthern	4th	4	12	0	
2005	2005	af2	American	Southern	3rd	5	11	0	
2006	2006	af2	National	Midwestern	3rd	10	6	0	Won First Round, 47–43 (Oklahoma City); Won Conference Semifinal, 53–51 (Tulsa); Lost Conference Championship, 30–48 (Spokane)
2007	2007	af2	National	Central	2nd	12	4	0	Lost First Round, 40–62 (Bossier-Shreveport)
2008	2008	af2	National	Central	2nd	11	5	0	Lost First Round, 55–68 (Central Valley)
2009	2009	af2	National	Southwest	2nd	11	5	0	Lost First Round, 36–77 (Boise)
Arkansas Diamonds
2010	2010	IFL	Intense	Lonestar East	1st	11	3	0	Won Conference Quarterfinal, 44–29 (Corpus Christi); Won Conference Semifinal, 36–31 (Amarillo); Lost Conference Championship, 42–53 (Billings)
Allen Wranglers
2011	2011	IFL	Intense	Lonestar	1st	10	4	0	Won First Round, 27–20 (Wyoming); Won Conference Semifinal, 72–54 (Fairbanks); Lost Conference Championship, 46–62 (Tri-Cities)
2012	2012	IFL	Intense		2nd	9	5	0	Lost Conference Semifinal, 40–43 (Wichita)
Texas Revolution
2013	2013	IFL	United		4th	5	9	0	
2014	2014	IFL	United		4th	3	11	0	
2015	2015	CIF			2nd	8	4	0	Won Semifinal, 39–27 (Wichita); Lost Champions Bowl I, 61–76 (Sioux City)
2016	2016	CIF		Southern	1st	10	2	0	Lost Division Championship, 53–57 (Amarillo)
2017	2017	CIF	South		2nd	8	4	0	Won Conference Semifinal, 63–59 (Dodge City); Won Conference Championship, 77–71 (Amarillo); Won Champions Bowl III, 59–49 (Omaha)
2018	2018	CIF	South		3rd	5	7	0	Won Conference Semifinal, 56–45 (Amarillo); Lost Conference Championship, 28–41 (Duke City)
2019	2019	CIF	South		DNF	4	1	0	Folded midseason
Totals						154	123	0	All-time regular season record (2000–2019)
Totals						13	13	—	All-time postseason record (2000–2019)
Totals						167	136	0	All-time regular season and postseason record (2000–2019)

== Players ==
=== All-IFL players ===
The following Revolution players were named to All-IFL teams:

- RB Darius Fudge (1)
- WR Clinton Solomon (1)
- DL Demario Dixon (1)
- LB James Lancaster (1)
- LB/DB Javicz Jones (1)
- DB Joey Longoria (1), Frankie Solomon Jr. (3)

=== Notable players ===
- WR Terrell Owens
- RB Jennifer Welter
