= Corpus Christi Sharks =

American arena football team

Logo

General information
- Founded: 2006
- Folded: 2009
- Headquartered: American Bank Center in Corpus Christi, Texas
- Colors: Light blue, yellow gold, white

Personnel
- General manager: Larry Linde
- Head coach: Michael Trigg

Team history
- Corpus Christi Sharks (2007–2009)

Home fields
- American Bank Center (2007–2009)

League / conference affiliations
- AF2 (2007–2009): National Conference (2007–2009); Southwest Division (2007–2009)

The Corpus Christi Sharks were a 2007 expansion member of the AF2, an arena American football development league. They played their home games at the American Bank Center. Michael Trigg was the team's head coach. Trigg had been a head coach in the Arena Football League with the Milwaukee Mustangs, Grand Rapids Rampage and Philadelphia Soul, coaching the Rampage to victory in ArenaBowl XV. The Sharks folded in October 2009 along with AF2 itself and did not join the 2010 revival of the Arena Football League as several other AF2 teams did.

The team is not to be confused with the Corpus Christi Hammerheads of the Intense Football League, which continued play throughout the Sharks' existence by moving to Robstown (while continuing to call itself a Corpus Christi team).

Classic arena football would eventually return to Corpus Christi in 2025 when Arena Football One admitted the Corpus Christi Tritons for the 2025 season.

== Season by season ==
Season records
| Season | W | L | T | Finish | Playoff results |
|---|---|---|---|---|---|
| 2007 | 6 | 10 | 0 | 3rd NC Southwest | -- |
| 2008 | 7 | 9 | 0 | 4th NC Southwest | -- |
| 2009 | 2 | 14 | 0 | 4th NC Southwest | -- |
| Totals | 15 | 33 | 0 | | |

== Notable players ==
See Category:Corpus Christi Sharks players F- Johnny Fils-Aime

== Coaches ==
- Michael Trigg 2007 Head Coach, Director of Football Operations
- Luke Byrnes 2009 Offensive Coordinator
- Quinn Cairo 2009 Defensive Coordinator
- Johnny Flores 2007 Assistant Coach, OL/DL, FB/LB
- Sven Offerson 2007 Equipment Manager
