= AF2 =

Former Arena Football League's developmental league

- Sport: Arena football
- Founded: 1999
- Founder: Arena Football League
- First season: 2000
- Folded: 2009
- CEO: Jerry Kurz
- No. of teams: 25
- Country: United States
- Last champion: Spokane Shock
- Most titles: (tie) Quad City Steamwheelers, Tulsa Talons & Spokane Shock (2)

The AF2 (styled as af2, and short for arenafootball2) was the Arena Football League's developmental league; it was founded in 1999 and played its first season in 2000. Like its parent AFL, the af2 played using the same arena football rules and style of play. League seasons ran from April through July with the postseason and ArenaCup championship in August. The af2 continued to operate while the AFL suspended operations for its 2009 season. The league was effectively disbanded in September 2009 when no team committed to playing in 2010, but several of the stronger franchises transferred into the reconstituted AFL.

Like most other minor sports leagues, the af2 existed to develop football players and also to help players adapt to the style and pace of arena football. In addition, the af2 was similar to other minor leagues because af2 teams played in smaller cities and smaller venues. While the AFL was played in cities like Los Angeles, New York City, Philadelphia, Dallas, and Chicago, the af2 fielded teams in cities which are part of metropolitan statistical areas ranging in size from Milwaukee (with 1,739,497 residents) to Albany, Georgia (with 164,000 residents). Also in common with other minor professional sports leagues, players also earned less than in the AFL, with each player making $200-$500 per game, with a minimum $50 victory bonus.

== History ==
The af2 was founded in 1999 by the Arena Football League in an attempt to bring the game to mid-sized markets following the success of AFL on the national level. The af2 was not intended to be a farm system for the AFL like the American Hockey League and Minor League Baseball are to the National Hockey League and Major League Baseball, respectively. The league was instead designed as a league that would develop the players in the interest of the higher league as a whole. The lack of AFL–af2 team affiliations would prevent the AFL from "stashing" players in the lower league for later use. Players in the af2 were signed to one-year contracts, after the expiration of which they essentially became free agents to sign with whichever league and team they would prefer. The 16-week contracts with the individual af2 teams also prevented players from leaving for the parent league mid-season; this preserved the quality of play in the lower league and did not destroy team dynamics with players coming and going throughout the season as they do in the NHL and MLB.

The foundation of the af2 was a response to the launch of several small-market indoor football leagues in the mid-to-late 1990s, including the Professional Indoor Football League, Indoor Professional Football League, and Indoor Football League. Each of these leagues, though they would eventually fold, managed to last for multiple seasons, proving that the game had some traction in the smaller cities. With Jim Foster's patent on arena football, the af2 had the advantage of being the same game as was being seen on the national level with the use of the rebound nets. Working on a smaller scale, the af2 would try to capitalize on local and regional rivalries.

The Xtreme Football League was another upstart league trying to capitalize on the arena football phenomenon. Founded in Birmingham, Alabama, with the intent to begin play in 2000, this XFL (which was not related to the WWE-backed outdoor league) used East Coast Hockey League ownership to keep team costs low while providing established ownership and arenas for play. The cities that were to take part in the Xtreme Football League were: Birmingham, Alabama (Birmingham Steeldogs), Greenville, South Carolina (Carolina Rhinos), Huntsville, Alabama (Tennessee Valley Vipers), Jacksonville, Florida (Jacksonville Tomcats), Norfolk, Virginia (Norfolk Nighthawks), Pensacola, Florida (Pensacola Barracudas), Richmond, Virginia (Richmond Speed), Roanoke, Virginia (Roanoke Steam), and Tallahassee, Florida (Tallahassee Thunder). Although a logo was developed and venues had begun to be lined up, the league and its nine teams were purchased by the af2 on July 29, 1999, and the Xtreme Football League never played a single game.

The af2 finally took the field in March 2000 in a game between the Birmingham Steeldogs and Tennessee Valley Vipers (two of the acquired XFL teams). Fifteen teams were fielded in 2000 with the rights for several more cities quickly secured. The Orlando Predators also purchased the competitor Indoor Football League; several teams would be absorbed into the af2 for the 2001 season.

The first season concluded with over 868,000 people attending af2 games, averaging over 7,200 per game; several teams ended with average attendances over 10,000 fans. In addition over 9,200 fans attended ArenaCup I between the Tennessee Valley Vipers and Quad City Steamwheelers in Moline, Illinois. Deemed a success, the league returned for a second season and returned all 15 original teams as well as 13 expansion teams.

=== Dissolution ===
For legal purposes, the league was effectively dissolved on September 8, 2009, when no team submitted the paperwork to return in 2010. Since the original AFL had suspended 2009 operations and later suspended all operations indefinitely after declaring bankruptcy, the minority owners (as the AFL owned 50.1%) of af2 were wary of being owned by and paying money owed to the bankrupt league's creditors.

The remaining teams and Board of Directors of af2, and some former members of the AFL joined to create a new league, originally called "Arena Football One", which was announced at a press conference on September 28, 2009. Legally, Arena Football One, later doing business as the Arena Football League, was an entity independent of the original Arena Football League and af2 and was made up of former AFL and af2 teams with several new (expansion) teams and one team from another league. After acquiring the assets of the former Arena Football League in a bankruptcy court sale, the new entity formally became the "new" Arena Football League. Unlike the previous Arena Football League and af2, the new AFL was an entity-model league in which the league owned the individual teams and hired local management groups to operate them, rather than the traditional North American sports league model where each team is a separate business and the league is a non-profit association formed and controlled by the various team owners in order to co-ordinate and govern operations.

== ArenaCup ==
The ArenaCup was the af2's championship game, held annually in August. For the league's first five years, it was held at the home arena of the higher-seeded remaining team. However, as the old AFL has changed, the af2 also changed. In the same year that ArenaBowl XIX was played at a neutral site in Las Vegas, ArenaCup VI was the first af2 championship to be played at a neutral site in Bossier City, Louisiana. The practice continued the following year when ArenaCup VII was played in Coliseo de Puerto Rico in San Juan; the title game returned to Bossier City in ArenaCup VIII. Citing lower attendances at the neutral site ArenaCup games, the league returned to the original arena arrangement for the 2008 season.

With the exception of ArenaCup V, all af2 championships were televised either nationally or locally. The inaugural and second ArenaCups were broadcast on TNN Motor Sports/TNN Sports, which carried AFL games on Sunday afternoons at the time. However, when the AFL broadcast rights were purchased by NBC, the ArenaCup national telecast was lost. The 2002 ArenaCup was televised by the Vision Network, and ArenaCup IV was televised by KWHB, a local station in Tulsa, Oklahoma. After having no television coverage in 2004, the national telecasts returned to the airwaves with Fox Sports Net in 2005 and Comcast Sports Net in 2006, 2007, and 2008.

ArenaCup IX, as well as the season in its entirety, was broadcast online via NiFTy TV.

== Hall of Fame ==
Shortly before folding, the af2 announced its inaugural (and only) Hall of Fame class. Inductees included

- Mitch Allner - Wide Receiver, Coach
- Jim "Skip" Foster - Coach
- Kevin Guy - Coach
- Rich Ingold - Coach
- Jerry Kurz - League President
- Dan Newman - Owner
- Kevin Prentiss - Wide Receiver
- Matt Sauk - quarterback
- Craig Strickland - quarterback

== Teams ==
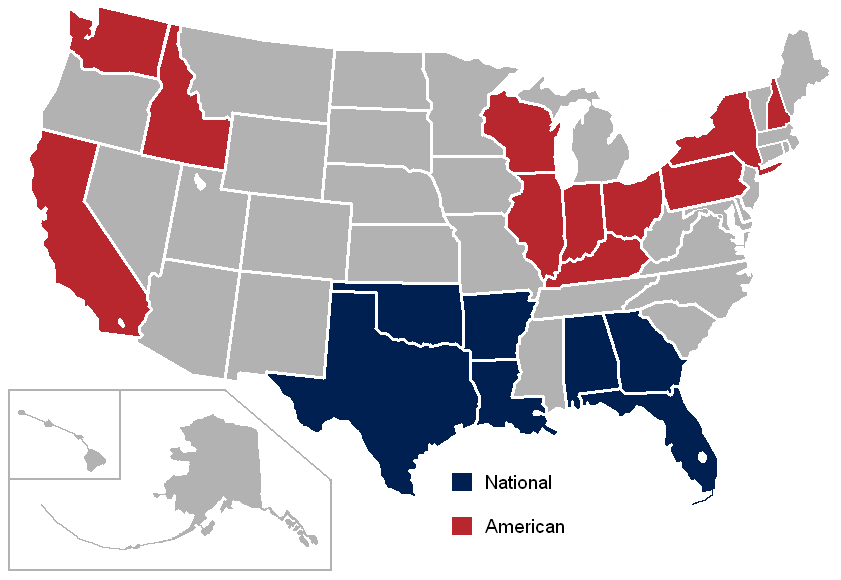

The league's teams were divided into two conferences, the American and National Conferences. The conferences were further subdivided into three divisions each. Each division represented a region of the country in which teams played. Unlike most sports leagues, the alignment of teams into divisions was not even; in 2009, the Central division featured three teams while the West featured five teams. Teams were placed in divisions based on geographic rivalries to reduce travel costs as teams played division opponents more often than non-divisional opponents. Alignment was subject to change each year as new teams joined the league and others dropped out.

Because of legal issues regarding the bankruptcy and subsequent dissolution of the original Arena Football League, no team committed to continue with arenafootball2 operations. This list is the final alignment of af2 at the end of the 2009 season.

| Division | Team | City | Arena | Founded | First af2 season |
American Conference
| East | Albany Firebirds | Albany, New York | Times Union Center | 2001 | 2002 |
| East | Mahoning Valley Thunder | Youngstown, Ohio | Covelli Centre | 2006 | 2007 |
| East | Manchester Wolves | Manchester, New Hampshire | Verizon Wireless Arena | 2001 | 2002 |
| East | Wilkes-Barre/Scranton Pioneers | Wilkes-Barre, Pennsylvania | Wachovia Arena | 2001 | 2002 |
| Midwest | Green Bay Blizzard | Green Bay, Wisconsin | Resch Center | 2002 | 2003 |
| Midwest | Iowa Barnstormers | Des Moines, Iowa | Wells Fargo Arena | 2000 | 2001 |
| Midwest | Milwaukee Iron | Milwaukee, Wisconsin | Bradley Center | 2008 | 2009 |
| Midwest | Peoria Pirates | Peoria, Illinois | Peoria Civic Center | 1998 | 2001 |
| Midwest | Quad City Steamwheelers | Moline, Illinois | iWireless Center | 1999 | 2000 |
| South | Florida Firecats | Estero, Florida | Germain Arena | 2000 | 2001 |
| South | Kentucky Horsemen | Lexington, Kentucky | Rupp Arena | 2002 | 2008 |
| South | South Georgia Wildcats | Albany, Georgia | Albany Civic Center | 2001 | 2002 |
| South | Tennessee Valley Vipers | Huntsville, Alabama | Von Braun Center | 1999 | 2000 |
National Conference
| Central | Amarillo Dusters | Amarillo, Texas | Amarillo Civic Center | 2003 | 2005 |
| Central | Oklahoma City Yard Dawgz | Oklahoma City | Ford Center | 2003 | 2004 |
| Central | Tulsa Talons | Tulsa, Oklahoma | BOK Center | 1999 | 2000 |
| Southwest | Arkansas Twisters | North Little Rock, Arkansas | Verizon Arena | 1999 | 2000 |
| Southwest | Bossier-Shreveport Battle Wings | Bossier City, Louisiana | CenturyTel Center | 2000 | 2001 |
| Southwest | Corpus Christi Sharks | Corpus Christi, Texas | American Bank Center | 2006 | 2007 |
| Southwest | Rio Grande Valley Dorados | Hidalgo, Texas | Dodge Arena | 2003 | 2004 |
| West | Boise Burn | Boise, Idaho | Qwest Arena | 2006 | 2007 |
| West | Central Valley Coyotes | Fresno, California | Selland Arena | 2001 | 2002 |
| West | Spokane Shock | Spokane, Washington | Spokane Veterans Memorial Arena | 2005 | 2006 |
| West | Stockton Lightning | Stockton, California | Stockton Arena | 2005 | 2006 |
| West | Tri-Cities Fever | Kennewick, Washington | Toyota Center | 2004 | 2007 |

=== League expansion ===
In a June 2003 interview with Sports Illustrated, AFL commissioner David Baker briefly mentioned the af2, saying how one day he envisioned the league growing to 100 teams. The af2 started off with 15 teams in 2000, then expanded to 28 teams in 2001, and finally to 34 in 2002. The number of teams the league fielded dropped every year from there on after, until the 2006 season; 27 teams were fielded in 2003, 25 in 2004, and 20 in 2005. Finally, in 2006, the af2 saw its first expansion in four years, fielding 23 teams, and continued that into 2007 with 30 teams.

The drop in teams between 2002 and 2006 could be partially attributed to the league expanding too rapidly in its first three seasons. Many teams were financially unstable and folded. This could have been at least in large measure due to higher expenses, even compared to those of similar leagues. Franchise fees in the league ranged from $600,000 to $1 million. Historically, massive sports league expansions have had little success, either in indoor football or other sports. For instance, the National Indoor Football League, a rival indoor league, saw large numbers of expansion teams after beginning play in 2001 but many struggled financially and played only briefly, incurring considerable financial losses before folding. In more recent years, the American Basketball Association has exhibited the same situation to an even greater degree.

Nine new expansion teams were approved for 2007 in the af2: the Boise Burn, the Cincinnati Jungle Kats, the Fort Wayne Fusion, the Laredo Lobos, the Lubbock Renegades, the Mahoning Valley Thunder, the Texas Copperheads, the Tri-Cities Fever, and the Corpus Christi Sharks. The Texas, Laredo, and Tri-Cities teams moved to the af2 from other indoor football leagues. For the 2007 season, the league fielded 30 teams. After the 2007 season, three of those teams folded, the Fort Wayne Fusion, the Cincinnati Jungle Kats, and the Laredo Lobos. The Everett Hawks, Alabama Steeldogs, and the Bakersfield Blitz also ceased operations.

For 2008, the league fielded one team fewer, at 29. Two teams were reactivated: the Iowa Barnstormers and the Peoria Pirates, and the league admitted three new teams that were transferring from other leagues. The Lexington Horsemen came from UIF; the Daytona Beach ThunderBirds, from the WIFL, and the Austin Wranglers moved down from the AFL. After the season, Austin and Daytona Beach folded, along with Louisville, Lubbock, and Texas. The league was expected to expand to Toledo, Ohio and Worcester, Massachusetts by 2011.

=== Continuing teams ===
When af2 folded, some teams joined the af2 Board of Directors in forming the new "Arena Football 1" that soon became the new Arena Football League. Iowa, Milwaukee, Tennessee Valley (which changed its name to Alabama to reflect the state, rather than the region), Oklahoma City, Tulsa, Bossier-Shreveport, and Spokane all moved to the new AFL to join "old" AFL teams Arizona, Orlando, Tampa Bay, Chicago, and Cleveland, along with expansion teams in Dallas and Jacksonville, and the American Indoor Football team in Utah that had also been in the old AFL. Kentucky, Tri-Cities, and Arkansas also committed to the new league, but Kentucky folded, and Tri-Cities and Arkansas followed Green Bay and Amarillo to the Indoor Football League. Albany did not play in 2010 while seeking an expansion into the "new" AFL in 2011, along with a planned addition in Toledo.

By the conclusion of the 2015 AFL Season, none of the seven af2 franchises that moved into the AFL remained in the league. The Oklahoma City Yard Dawgz ceased operations after the 2010 season. In the 2011 season, the Alabama Vipers relocated to suburban Atlanta and assumed the identity and history of the former Georgia Force before folding after the 2012 season, while the Bossier-Shreveport Battle Wings moved to New Orleans and became a continuation of the VooDoo and then ceased operations after the 2015 season. The Milwaukee Iron rebranded itself in 2011 as the Mustangs, adopting the name of a previous Milwaukee team. Tulsa relocated to San Antonio before the start of the 2012 season, retaining the Talons' name and history and folded after the 2014 season. Milwaukee suspended operations for the 2013 season, and the team relocated to Portland, Oregon for the 2014 season, becoming the Portland Thunder, later renamed the Steel before ultimately folding after the 2016 AFL season. After the 2014 AFL season, the Iowa Barnstormers changed leagues from the AFL to the Indoor Football League. After the conclusion of the 2015 season, the last af2 team remaining in the AFL, the Spokane Shock, joined the Barnstormers in the IFL as the Spokane Empire, and then also folded in 2017.

After the conclusion of the 2019 AFL season, the Arena Football League filed for Chapter 7 bankruptcy and ceased operations in November 2019.

== See also ==
- Defunct AF2 teams
- List of leagues of American and Canadian football
