= Jay McDonagh =

American football player (born 1973)

Profile
- Position: Quarterback

Personal information
- Born: February 7, 1973 (age 53)
- Listed height: 6 ft 2 in (1.88 m)
- Listed weight: 200 lb (91 kg)

Career information
- High school: Gordon Tech (Chicago, Illinois)
- College: Western Michigan
- NFL draft: 1996: undrafted

Career history
- Bologna Phoenix (1997); Green Bay Bombers (1998); Buffalo Destroyers (1999–2000); Madison Mad Dogs (2000); Quad City Steamwheelers (2001); New Jersey/Las Vegas Gladiators (2001–2003); Colorado Crush (2003–2004); Columbus Destroyers (2004); Bologna Warriors (2005)

Awards and highlights
- af2 Offensive Player of the Year (2001)

Career AFL statistics
- Comp. / Att.: 593 / 980
- Passing yards: 6,571
- TD–INT: 110–33
- QB rating: 94.48
- Rushing TDs: 2
- Stats at ArenaFan.com

Jay McDonagh (born February 7, 1973) is an American former professional football quarterback who played four seasons in the Arena Football League (AFL) with the Buffalo Destroyers, New Jersey/Las Vegas Gladiators and Columbus Destroyers. He played college football at Western Michigan University. He was also a member of the Bologna Phoenix and Bologna Warriors of the Italian Football League, Green Bay Bombers, Madison Mad Dogs, Quad City Steamwheelers, Colorado Crush.

== Early life and college ==
McDonagh attended Gordon Technical High School in Chicago, Illinois.

McDonagh played college football for the Western Michigan Broncos. He was a two-time All-Conference selection at Western Michigan and three-time team MVP. He earned All-Mid-American Conference second team honors in 1995. McDonagh recorded career totals of 529 completions for 892 attempts, 6,148 yards and 45 touchdowns.

== Professional career ==
McDonagh played for the Bologna Phoenix in the Italian Football League during the 1997 season. The Phoenix advanced to the Italian Super Bowl, while McDonagh was voted as league and team MVP.

McDonagh played for the Green Bay Bombers of the Professional Indoor Football League in 1998. He was named Offensive Player of the Year and an All-Star after throwing for 56 touchdowns.

McDonagh was a backup quarterback for the Buffalo Destroyers of the Arena Football League (AFL) in 1999. He was briefly traded the Carolina Cobras in March 2000 but the transaction was voided.

McDonagh played for the Madison Mad Dogs of the Indoor Football League in 2000. He earned All-League honors while helping his team to an 11–6 record. In defeat of the Billings Thunderbolts, he completed 18 of 37 passes for 172 yards and 5 touchdowns. In a victory against the Minnesota Purple Rage, McDonagh completed 15 of 23 passes for 4 touchdowns and 199 yards.

McDonagh played for the Quad City Steamwheelers of the af2 in 2001. He played in 15 games, finishing with a quarterback rating of 131.9. He completed 303 of 424 pass attempts for 73 touchdowns and seven interceptions during the season. McDonagh averaged 254.8 passing yards per game and helped the team to their second championship by winning ArenaCup II. He threw for 280 yards and three touchdowns in the ArenaCup victory over the Richmond Speed.

McDonagh signed with the AFL's New Jersey Gladiators in November 2001. He played for the Gladiators from 2002 to 2003, recording 107 touchdowns on 6,357 passing yards.

McDonagh signed with the Colorado Crush of the AFL in November 2003. He was released by the Crush on January 29, 2004.

McDonagh was signed to the Columbus Destroyers' practice squad on April 2, 2004. He was promoted to the active roster on April 6, 2004.

McDonagh played for the Bologna Warriors in Italian Football League during the 2005 season. The Warriors advanced to the Italian Super Bowl but they lost to Bergamo Lions 42–14.

== Career statistics ==
=== AFL ===
Year	Team	Passing							Rushing		
Year	Team	Cmp	Att	Pct	Yds	TD	Int	Rtg	Att	Yds	TD
1999	Buffalo	13	32	40.6	179	3	0	82.68	3	5	0
2002	New Jersey	334	536	62.3	3,599	62	15	99.25	24	71	7
2003	Las Vegas	242	407	59.5	2,758	45	18	89.08	43	95	15
2004	Columbus	4	5	80.0	35	0	0	95.83	0	0	0
Career		593	980	60.5	6,571	110	33	94.48	70	171	22

=== College ===
Year	Team	Passing								Rushing			
Year	Team	Cmp	Att	Pct	Yds	Y/A	TD	Int	Rtg	Att	Yds	Avg	TD
1993	Western Michigan	174	283	61.5	1,974	7.0	16	4	135.9	106	325	3.1	2
1994	Western Michigan	172	293	58.7	2,136	7.3	16	12	129.8	88	228	2.6	2
1995	Western Michigan	183	316	57.9	2,038	6.4	13	8	120.6	125	214	1.7	3
Career		529	892	59.3	6,148	6.9	45	24	128.5	319	767	2.4	7
