= Madison Mad Dogs =

American indoor football team

Logo

General information
- Founded: 1998
- Folded: 2000
- Headquartered: Dane County Coliseum in Madison, Wisconsin
- Colors: Red, silver, black, white

Personnel
- Head coach: Richard "Dick" Adams

Team history
- Madison Mad Dogs (1999-2000)

Home fields
- Dane County Coliseum (1999-2000)

League / conference affiliations
- Professional Indoor Football League (1998) Indoor Football League (1999-2000): Eastern Conference (1999-2000); Northern Division (1999-2000)

The Madison Mad Dogs were an indoor football team that played in the Professional Indoor Football League (PIFL) in 1998, and in the Indoor Football League (IFL) in 1999 & 2000. The Mad Dogs franchise was owned by Keary Ecklund. The team office was based in Madison, Wisconsin, and played their games at the Dane County Coliseum, now Veterans Memorial Coliseum, at the Alliant Energy Center. The team colors were: Red, Silver, and Black. The Mad Dogs were coached by Richard "Dick" Adams for the '98 PIFL season.

The Mad Dogs played four preseason PIFL games in '98. Winning only once:

- February 18 – Madison Mad Dogs 22 at Green Bay Bombers 64
- February 23 – Green Bay Bombers 45 at Madison Mad Dogs 39
- March 19 – Colorado Wildcats 20 at Madison Mad Dogs 27
- March 28 – Madison Mad Dogs 29 at Minnesota Monsters 33

The Madison Mad Dogs tied with their sister team, Green Bay Bombers – both teams owned by Ecklund, for the second best record in the PIFL with a 10-4 record. In the playoffs, the Mad Dogs hosted the Bombers in the first round. They won 46-19.

Keary Ecklund took his Bombers and Mad Dogs teams and defected from the PIFL to form the IFL. In 1999, the team, finished 6-6 in the Northern Division of the IFL.

The following year was very similar, but finalized with a couple of playoff games. The Mad Dogs finished 8-6 in the Northern Division of the IFL. Then, Madison faced Erie at home in the first round of the IFL playoffs. Defeating them 34-22 and advancing to the second round at Peoria. Peoria was too much for the Mad Dogs, as they lost 13-25 and out of the IFL playoffs. When the IFL was sold, following the 2000 season, the Mad Dogs disappeared.

Fast forward and the Mad dogs have rebranded to the Mad Dawgs. As of 2025 they are a part of the growing Mid-West United Football League- MWUL

== Season-by-season ==
Season records
Season	W	L	T	Finish	Playoff results
Madison Mad Dogs (PIFL)
1998	10	4	0	2nd League	Won Semifinal (Green Bay); Lost PIFL Championship (Louisiana)
Madison Mad Dogs (IFL)
1999	6	6	0	3rd Northern	--
2000	8	6	0	3rd EC Northern	Won Round 1 (Erie); Lost Quarterfinal (Peoria)
Totals	26	18	0	(including playoffs)	

== Madison Mad Dogs 1998 PIFL schedule ==
- April 10 – Louisiana Bayou Beast 36, at Madison Mad Dogs 28
- April 19 – Madison Mad Dogs 33, at Louisiana Bayou Beast 67
- April 27 – Great Britain Spartans‡ 12, at Madison Mad Dogs† 29

†EXHIBITION GAME

‡Team in the proposed PIFL European Division – set for late '98

- May 2 – Texas Bullets 28, at Madison Mad Dogs 35
- May 9 – Madison Mad Dogs 49, at Utah Catzz 27
- May 16 – Madison Mad Dogs 24, at Honolulu Hurricanes 33
- May 23 – Green Bay Bombers 30, at Madison Mad Dogs 31
- May 31 – Madison Mad Dogs 44, at Texas Bullets 46
- June 6 – Minnesota Monsters 20, at Madison Mad Dogs† 36

†EXHIBITION GAME

- June 13 – Madison Mad Dogs at Minnesota Monsters – Minnesota forfeits
- June 20 – Honolulu Hurricanes 36, at Madison Mad Dogs 64
- July 4 – Madison Mad Dogs at Colorado Wildcats – Colorado forfeits
- July 11 – Madison Mad Dogs 52, at Green Bay Bombers 30
- July 18 – Colorado Wildcats 18, at Madison Mad Dogs 54
- August 1 – Utah Catzz at Madison Mad Dogs – Utah forfeits

PLAYOFF SUMMARY

- August 7 – #3 Green Bay Bombers 19, at #2 Madison Mad Dogs 46

PIFL CHAMPIONSHIP GAME

- August 15 – #2 Madison Mad Dogs 41, at #1 Louisiana Bayou Beast 42

== Madison Mad Dogs 1999 IFL schedule ==
- April 2 – Madison at Peoria Pirates 0-36
- April 9 – Dayton Skyhawks at Madison 41-48
- Week 3 bye
- April 23 – Madison at Lincoln Lightning 37-34
- April 30 – Topeka Knights at Madison 26-38
- May 7 – Green Bay Bombers at Madison 33-23
- May 14 – Madison at Duluth-Superior Lumberjacks 55-28
- May 21 – Steel Valley Smash at Madison 47-53
- Week 9 – Madison at Green Bay Bombers 34-59
- Week 10 – Madison at Steel Valley Smash 33-50
- Week 11 – Peoria Pirates at Madison 52-22
- Week 12 – Madison at Dayton Skyhawks 47-51
- Week 13 – Lincoln Lightning at Madison 41-47

== Madison Mad Dogs 2000 IFL schedule ==
- Week 1 Madison at Peoria Pirates 20-46
- Week 2 bye
- Week 3 Madison at Green Bay Bombers 27-53
- Week 4 Minnesota Purple Rage at Madison 48-32
- Week 5 La Crosse River Rats at Madison 27-56
- Week 6 Madison at Billings Thunderbolts 33-60
- Week 7 Steel Valley Smash at Madison 24-49
- Week 8 Madison at La Crosse River Rats 37-25
- Week 9 Peoria Pirates at Madison 62-59
- Week 10 Duluth-Superior Lumberjacks at Madison 25-57
- Week 11 Madison at Duluth-Superior Lumberjacks 66-21
- Week 12 Johnstown Jackals at Madison 45-54
- Week 13 Green Bay Bombers at Madison 44-31
- Week 14 Fargo Freeze at Madison 26-37
- Week 15 Madison at Minnesota Purple Rage 61-45

PLAYOFF SUMMARY

- Week 1 – Erie Invaders at Madison 22-34
- Week 2 – Madison at Peoria Pirates 13-25
