= Honolulu Hurricanes =

Logo

General information
- Founded: 1998
- Folded: 1999
- Headquartered: Honolulu, Hawaii at the Neal S. Blaisdell Center
- Colors: Red, Gold, Black, White

Personnel
- Owners: Pro Sports Limited Liability Company (Rev. John Frederick, Sig Schuster, Dennis Enomoto, Neil Wiedemann, Louis "Sonny" Souza and James K. Wong)
- General manager: Sig Schuster
- Head coach: Louis "Sonny" Souza, Sig Schuster
- President: Sig Schuster

Team history
- Honolulu Hurricanes (1998)

Home fields
- Neal S. Blaisdell Center (1998)

League / conference affiliations
- Professional Indoor Football League (1998)

The Honolulu Hurricanes was a Professional Indoor Football League (PIFL) team based in Honolulu, Hawaii, that competed in the 1998 season. According to the team's media guide, the ownership partners – registered as Pro Sports Limited Liability Company – were Rev. John Frederick, the team's founder and co head coach; Sig Schuster, the CEO; Dennis Enomoto; Neil Wiedemann; Louis "Sonny" Souza, the team's on-field coach; and James K. Wong. The team office was based in Honolulu, and played their home games at the Neal S. Blaisdell Center, also in Honolulu. The team colors were red and gold. The Hurricanes were coached by the Hawaii Police Department's Louis "Sonny" Souza.

The Hurricanes played two preseason PIFL games in 1998, both victories at home:

- February 28 – Las Vegas Outlaws† 14 at Honolulu Hurricanes 53
- March 27 – Tucson Mirage† 19 at Honolulu Hurricanes 25

†scheduled 1999 PIFL expansion team

1998 PIFL Honolulu Hurricanes away games helmet design

All players on the Honolulu opening day roster played high school or college football in Hawaii. The list included: receivers Micah Matsuzaki and Dan Ahuna, running backs Tupu Alualu and Jerry Papalii, quarterback John Hao, offensive lineman Damon Kakalia, defensive back Niko Vitale, linebackers Manly Williams and George Noga and defensive linemen Kalei Cockett and Junior Tagoai.

The Hurricanes franchise drew about 5,500 for its first game (preseason), and 3,800 for the second, but averaged between 500 and 1,000 per game after that. Honolulu ended the 1998 PIFL season with a 6-8 record. However, the team nearly made the playoffs when commissioner Richard "Dick" Suess nearly expelled the Green Bay Bombers, Madison Mad Dogs, and Colorado Wildcats after the announcement that they were leaving to start a rival league following the season.

1998 PIFL Honolulu Hurricanes home games helmet design

After the season, the Hurricanes were sold. One reason was the mounting financial burden of having to travel to the mainland for games, a problem common to nearly all Hawaii sports teams who schedule competitions on the mainland. The new owners were Straub chief executive officer Dr. Blake Waterhouse, former Hawaii Winter Baseball League owner Duane Kurisu, insurance company executive Carl Hennrich, Borthwick Group owners John and Diane Farias Jr., Borthwick general manager Scott Sells, Robertson and Co. Jewelers owner Robert Wu and Regal Travel owner Ray Miyashiro. Along with ownership change, the Hurricanes were renamed the "Hawaii Hammerheads" for the 1999 season, for which the league was likewise renamed as the "Indoor Professional Football League" rather than the Professional Indoor Football League.

== Season-by-season ==
Season records
Season	W	L	T	Finish	Playoff results
1998	6	8	0	5th League	--

== Honolulu Hurricanes 1998 schedule ==
- April 11 - Honolulu Hurricanes 37, at Colorado Wildcats 48
- April 25 - Honolulu Hurricanes 46, at Texas Bullets 40
- May 9 - Green Bay Bombers 46, at Honolulu Hurricanes 45
- May 16 - Madison Mad Dogs 24, at Honolulu Hurricanes 33
- May 22 - Minnesota Monsters 42, at Honolulu Hurricanes 20 – Minnesota forfeit
- May 30 - Colorado Wildcats 42, at Honolulu Hurricanes 34
- June 6 - Honolulu Hurricanes 59, at Louisiana Bayou Beast 69
- June 20 - Honolulu Hurricanes 36, at Madison Mad Dogs 64
- June 27 - Honolulu Hurricanes 50, at Utah Catzz 52
- July 4 - Texas Bullets at Honolulu Hurricanes – Texas forfeit
- July 11 - Honolulu Hurricanes at Minnesota Monsters – Minnesota forfeit
- July 18 - Honolulu Hurricanes 18, at Green Bay Bombers 46
- July 25 - Utah Catzz 12, at Honolulu Hurricanes 42
- August 2 - Louisiana Bayou Beast 52, at Honolulu Hurricanes 29
