= Texas Bullets =

- Founded: 1998
- Folded: 1998 (moved to the IPFL)
- Team history: Texas Bullets (1998)
- Based in: Belton, Texas at the Bell County Expo Center
- Home arena: Bell County Expo Center (1998)
- League: Professional Indoor Football League (1998)
- Colors: Black, Turquoise, & Silver

Personnel
- Head coach: Wayne Stigler

The Texas Bullets were a team in the Professional Indoor Football League (PIFL) in 1998. The Bullets franchise was owned by Wayne Stigler, who also was the team's head coach. The Bullets played their home games at the Bell County Expo Center in Belton, TX., with the team offices located in Temple, TX. The team's colors were: Black, Turquoise, & Silver. The Bullets suffered disappointing attendance and the costs of taking the team on a road trip to Hawaii to take on the Honolulu Hurricanes proved too much. The team folded after ten regular season games. Of the eight clubs that were in the first batch of PIFL franchises in '98, six still existed. The Bullets franchise was moved to Austin, Texas, in 1999 and renamed the Texas Terminators in the renamed Indoor Professional Football League.

The Bullets played three preseason PIFL games in 1997-1998. All were losses on the road:

- December 20, 1997 - Texas Bullets 22 at Utah Catzz 47 F
- March 28, 1998 - Texas Bullets 39 at Louisiana Bayou Beast 62 F
- April 6, 1998 - Texas Bullets 9 at Colorado Wildcats 49 F

== 1998 Schedule ==
- April 11 - Texas Bullets 19, at Green Bay Bombers 47
- April 18 - Texas Bullets 24, at Utah Catzz 57
- April 25 - Honolulu Hurricanes 46, at Texas Bullets 40
- May 2 - Texas Bullets 28, at Madison Mad Dogs 35
- May 9 - Minnesota Monsters 32, at Texas Bullets 34 (OT)
- May 16 - Texas Bullets 49, at Green Bay Bombers 71
- May 23 - Texas Bullets 51, at Louisiana Bayou Beast 56
- May 31 - Madison Mad Dogs 44, at Texas Bullets 46
- June 7 - Texas Bullets 28, at Colorado Wildcats 51
- June 13 - Louisiana Bayou Beast 40, at Texas Bullets 37
- July 4 - Texas Bullets at Honolulu Hurricanes - Texas forfeits
- July 18 - Utah Catzz at Texas Bullets - Texas forfeits
- July 25 - Texas Bullets at Minnesota Monsters - both teams forfeit
- August 1 - Colorado Wildcats at Texas Bullets - Texas forfeits

== Texas Bullets 1998 Roster ==
- Anthony Allen (East Texas State) DB/WR
- John Henry (Baylor) RB
- Lamont Moore (Baylor) WR/DB
- Brent Alford (Baylor) WR/QB
- Greg Bower (Texas) DL/LB
- Butch Hadnot (Texas) RB
- Lee McCormick (Murray State) WR
- Jackie Warren (Waco Midway HS) WR
- Kevin Ward (Texas Tech) OL
- Lawrence Page (Ole Miss) RB
- Marc Saldana (Texas Tech) QB
- Trey Burke (East Texas State) OL
- Ken Otte (Texas) DL
- Bryan Blake (Tarleton State) LB
- Scott Carey (Tarleton State) OL
- Adrian Coe DB
- Joey Tate (Eisenhower HS) DB
- Rolf Schaeffer K
- Billy Watkins (East Texas State) K
- Tim Cook (none) OL/DL
- Matthew House (UOP/SRJC) LB
- Kevin Carter (U S Navy) LB / Coach
- Bobby Craig DB
