= Louisiana Bayou Beast =

Logo

General information
- Founded: 1998
- Folded: 2001
- Headquartered: Monroe, Louisiana at the Monroe Civic Center
- Colors: Black, Red, White, & Yellow
- Mascot: Blitz

Personnel
- Owners: James & Carolyn Shiver Sr.
- Head coach: John Fourcade

Team history
- Louisiana Bayou Beast (1998-1999, 2001); Louisiana Rangers (2000)

Home fields
- Pete Maravich Assembly Center (1998); Riverside Centroplex (1999); Monroe Civic Center (2001)

League / conference affiliations
- Professional Indoor Football League (1998); Indoor Professional Football League (1999); National Indoor Football League (2001)

Championships
- League championships: 1 PIFL: 1998

The Louisiana Bayou Beast were a team in the Professional Indoor Football League (PIFL) in 1998, in the Indoor Professional Football League (IPFL) in 1999 and reincarnated in 2001 in the National Indoor Football League (NIFL). The Bayou Beast franchise was owned by James (Sr.) and Carolyn Shiver, who currently own and operate the NIFL which is based in Lafayette, Louisiana. The Bayou Beast competed in the PIFL in 1998, playing their home games at the Pete Maravich Assembly Center on the LSU campus in Baton Rouge. The team colors were red, black, and white. In 1999, the PIFL changed its name to the IPFL, and the Beast changed arenas, moving to the Riverside Centroplex in downtown Baton Rouge for that season.

After two seasons, the Bayou Beast moved to Alexandria. and were renamed the Louisiana Rangers for the IPFL 2000 season.

The team was reincarnated in 2001 for the National Indoor Football League, and based in Monroe, Louisiana. Following that season, the franchise folded.

== 1998 PIFL season ==
The Bayou Beast played its inaugural game on the road against the Madison Mad Dogs on April 10, 1998. They won the game 36–28 in front of a crowd of 4,283. The team logo, consisting of a raging "Beast" busting through his football uniform, known as "Blitz". Some spectators said that the "Bayou Beast" logo (Blitz) looked like "a raccoon on steroids".

In their first year, they won 13 out of 14 games (losing only to the Colorado Wildcats 41–49 on May 9, 1998) to win the PIFL's first regular season title. With a 10-game win streak to end the season, the Bayou Beast were seeded in the #1 position with the home field advantage throughout the playoffs.

== PIFL Playoff Semifinals ==
Their first playoff game would be against the #4 ranked Colorado Wildcats. A couple of key events took place before the opening kickoff of this game. First, the Pete Maravich Assembly Center, home arena of the Bayou Beast, could not be used since it was previously booked for that weekend. A deal was worked out with the Riverside Centroplex to host the Beast's first playoff game. Secondly, the owner of the Colorado Wildcats was financially strapped by the end of the season and was about to forfeit their playoff appearance rather than pay travel costs to Baton Rouge. The Shivers, the Bayou Beast owners, offered to pay travel expenses for the Wildcats to compete against the Beast. This would also be their chance to avenge the only loss of the season by defeating them in the playoffs. The Bayou Beast did just that by winning 67–51.

== PIFL Championship Game ==
The only PIFL Championship game was hosted in Baton Rouge, back in the Pete Maravich Assembly Center. It pitted the #1 Louisiana Bayou Beast versus the second-seeded Madison Mad Dogs who had defeated their sister team (both teams owned by Keary Ecklund), the #3 Green Bay Bombers 46–19. Louisiana quarterback Doug Coleman hit receiver Derrick Fobb with a 20-yard touchdown pass with no time remaining to give the Louisiana Bayou Beast the inaugural Professional Indoor Football League championship by a 42-41 margin. Coleman fumbled the snap on the big play but managed to pick up the ball and run out of trouble before spotting Fobb alone in the end zone. Matt Huerkamp, the league's top kicker, nailed the extra point for the win. Coleman's throw, his fourth scoring toss of the evening, came one play after Madison was penalized for a facemask penalty, giving the Bayou Beast one final untimed down.

Madison had taken a 41–35 lead with just 18.3 seconds remaining on a Raymond Philyaw to Mandrell Dean strike. On the play, Dean leaped between two defenders to pull down what at the time looked like the decisive score. Following the Mad Dogs' touchdown, Coleman hit Michael Lewis with a throw to set the Bayou Beast up in Madison territory. The Madison Mad Dogs defense stiffened, first coming up with a sack and then pressuring Coleman into an incomplete pass. The failed pass attempt would have been the final play of the game; however, an incidental facemask penalty gave Louisiana one last shot.

== Louisiana Bayou Beast 1998 PIFL schedule ==
- March 28† – Texas Bullets 39, at Louisiana Bayou Beast 62
- April 4† – Utah Catzz 42, at Louisiana Bayou Beast 40

† Pre-Season PIFL games

- April 10 – Louisiana Bayou Beast 36, at Madison Mad Dogs 28
- April 19 – Madison Mad Dogs 33, at Louisiana Bayou Beast 67
- May 9 – Louisiana Bayou Beast 41, at Colorado Wildcats 49
- May 16 – Louisiana Bayou Beast 44, at Utah Catzz 14
- May 23 – Texas Bullets 51, at Louisiana Bayou Beast 56
- May 30 – Louisiana Bayou Beast 57, at Green Bay Bombers 40
- June 6 – Honolulu Hurricanes 59, at Louisiana Bayou Beast 69
- June 13 – Louisiana Bayou Beast 40, at Texas Bullets 37
- June 20 – Utah Catzz 16, at Louisiana Bayou Beast 43
- June 27 – Green Bay Bombers 22, at Louisiana Bayou Beast 29
- July 4 – Minnesota Monsters at Louisiana Bayou Beast – Minnesota forfeits
- July 4 – Syracuse Blitz 18, at Louisiana Bayou Beast 39‡

‡ this game scheduled as an exhibition game to replace the forfeit

- July 11 – Colorado Wildcats 22, at Louisiana Bayou Beast 31
- July 19 – Louisiana Bayou Beast at Minnesota Monsters – Minnesota forfeits
- August 2 – Louisiana Bayou Beast 52, at Honolulu Hurricanes 29

PLAYOFFS

- August 9 – Colorado Wildcats 51, at Louisiana Bayou Beast 67

PIFL CHAMPIONSHIP

- August 15 – Madison Mad Dogs 41, at Louisiana Bayou Beast 42

=== 1999 IPFL season ===
In 1999, the Beast started off with a new arena Riverside Centroplex, two new head coaches (Jeff Majors & Chris Carrier) , a new GM (Les Crooks, formerly GM of the ECHL Baton Rouge Kingfish) , a local television and production deal to air the games tape-delayed along with a weekly coach's show, Wall2Wall Football (KTTE 11 – Ind. Baton Rouge), and a kiosk at the local mall selling IPFL and Bayou Beast merchandise (Cortana Mall). Then the wheels started to fall off. The Beast lost their season opener on the road to the Mississippi Firedogs 35–45 in front of a crowd of 5,138. Then, the new GM left the team and the production company was dropped after they failed to record the first home game correctly. The Beast media relations director took over as Interim GM until the position was filled with Ted "Rock" Knapp from Houston, Texas . After trying Co-Head Coaches for the '99 Bayou Beast, the team had a 2–5 record going into an off week. During that off time, Ted "Rock" Knapp was promoted to Head Coach/General Manager of the Bayou Beast and Coaches Majors and Carrier were terminated.

==== Chris Beard spinal cord injury ====
The first game for the "Rock" as head coach of the Bayou Beast was at home against the Texas Terminators. During the game, when Chris Beard tackled Texas wideout Cory Caesar, Beard's head snapped back. This broke his neck and he was not able to move. He laid motionless for 30 minutes on the field. His condition was unknown to other players and spectators after his being taken to Our Lady of the Lake Hospital. During the delay, both the Louisiana Bayou Beast and the Texas Terminators got together at midfield, kneeled, and prayed for Beard. The next day, Beard underwent a seven-hour surgery to his neck. He was in intensive care at the hospital. The hit left him paralyzed in his arms and legs. Dr. Steven Bailey performed the surgery and said his diagnosis was undetermined at this time. Television station WAFB 9 (CBS – Baton Rouge) reported that Beard's neck may have been injured on an earlier play and showed a film clip of it on their 10pm local news. Additionally, throughout the game, Beard had failed to attach his chin strap on his helmet. It is undetermined if it was attached on the play he was injured or injured more severely by not having it attached. A trust fund was set up at a local bank for donations to help with the hospital costs.

==== Longest game in IPFL history ====
The next Bayou Beast game, against arch-rival Mississippi Fire Dogs at home, was dedicated to Chris Beard. The Beast would donate 25% of all ticket sales (till the end of the season) into the Chris Beard trust fund . Replica jerseys of Beard's and other merchandise were sold to raise money for the fund, and a giant six-foot "Get Well" card was signed at the gate by all who attended this game. The team asked the league if they could remove the "Beast" logo from the side of their helmets for the rest of the '99 IPFL season, as their tribute to Chris. The league denied their request for the logo but granted permission for the removal of the yellow stripe on the top of the helmet. From that game on, every Bayou Beast game would be played without a stripe on the helmet. The Bayou Beast won with a 31-yard field goal by Mike Shafer during the second overtime period, making this the longest IPFL game ever played.

==== Third head coach change during 1999 season ====
On July 13, the Bayou Beast released head coach Ted "Rock" Knapp. No reason was given. Knapp had a record of 2-3 as head coach and 3-5 since joining the Bayou Beast as the general manager. The following day, Barrett Murphy was named the new head coach of the Louisiana Bayou Beast. Barrett brought back Jeff Majors as the offensive coordinator, and Gary Frank remained with the team as linesman coach.

The first test for Murphy and the Bayou Beast was a heartbreaking loss to the first place Texas Terminators, 16–23. The lost gave Texas the 1999 IPFL regular season championship title, home field advantage as host of the 1999 IPFL championship game, and knocked the Bayou Beast out of the playoff race. Barrett ended with an overall record of 2–2 in the last four games of the season.

==== The Bayou Beast franchise relocates ====
On February 12, 2000, The Louisiana Bayou Beast IPFL football team announced that it would relocate to Alexandria, Louisiana. and would be renamed the Louisiana Rangers for the 2000 IPFL season.

== Louisiana Bayou Beast 1999 IPFL schedule ==
- March 20† – Mississippi Fire Dogs at Louisiana Bayou Beast – CANCELLED
- March 26† – Mississippi Fire Dogs 25, at Louisiana Bayou Beast 35

† Pre-Season IPFL games

- April 8 – Louisiana Bayou Beast 35, at Mississippi Fire Dogs 45
- April 17 – Texas Terminators 47, at Louisiana Bayou Beast 28
- April 25 – Rocky Mountain Thunder 32, at Louisiana Bayou Beast 34
- May 2 – Louisiana Bayou Beast 36, at Idaho Stallions 44
- May 8 – Mississippi Fire Dogs 45, at Louisiana Bayou Beast 46
- May 15 – Louisiana Bayou Beast 38, at Rocky Mountain Thunder 39
- May 22 – Louisiana Bayou Beast 46, at Texas Terminators 62
- June 5 – Texas Terminators 35, at Louisiana Bayou Beast 13
- June 12 – Mississippi Fire Dogs 29, at Louisiana Bayou Beast 31 (2OT)
- June 18 – Louisiana Bayou Beast 10, at Mississippi Fire Dogs 59
- July 4 – Rocky Mountain Thunder 9, at Louisiana Bayou Beast 37
- July 10 – Hawaii Hammerheads 36, at Louisiana Bayou Beast 13
- July 18 – Louisiana Bayou Beast 16, at Texas Terminators 23
- July 24 – Idaho Stallions 34, at Louisiana Bayou Beast 51
- August 1 – Louisiana Bayou Beast 20, at Hawaii Hammerheads 24
- August 4 – Louisiana Bayou Beast 32, at Hawaii Hammerheads 30

=== 2001 NIFL season ===
The team was reincarnated in 2001 in the National Indoor Football League (NIFL) and this time based in Monroe, Louisiana. The Shivers owned and operated the team and now were the owners of the NIFL, too. The Bayou Beast only managed a 1–13 record that year, even with switching head coaches in the middle of the season. After the season, due to low attendance in Monroe, the franchise was folded. Contrary to popular belief, the Bayou Beast were NOT sold, relocated to Houma, Louisiana, and renamed the Houma Bayou Bucks for the 2002 NIFL season.

== Louisiana Bayou Beast 2001 NIFL schedule ==
- Week 1 Johnstown J Dogs vs. Louisiana Bayou Beast 55-40
- Week 2 off
- Week 3 off
- Week 4 Louisiana Rangers vs. Louisiana Bayou Beast 56-41
- Week 5 Mobile Seagulls vs. Louisiana Bayou Beast 46-21
- Week 6 Tupelo FireAnts vs. Louisiana Bayou Beast 43-34
- Week 7 Mississippi Fire Dogs vs. Louisiana Bayou Beast 41-6
- Week 8 Louisiana Bayou Beast vs. Mobile Seagulls 36-40
- Week 9 Louisiana Bayou Beast vs. Lake Charles Land Sharks 26-63
- Week 10 Louisiana Bayou Beast vs. Tupelo FireAnts 15-63
- Week 11 Louisiana Rangers vs. Louisiana Bayou Beast 43-45 (only victory of season)
- Week 12 Louisiana Bayou Beast vs. Sioux Falls Storm 21-58
- Week 13 Ohio Valley Greyhounds vs. Louisiana Bayou Beast 69-32
- Week 14 Mississippi Fire Dogs vs. Louisiana Bayou Beast 53-46
- Week 15 Louisiana Bayou Beast vs. Tupelo FireAnts 35-49
- Week 16 Lake Charles Land Sharks vs. Louisiana Bayou Beast 55-49

== Season-by-season overall records ==
Season records
Season	W	L	T	Finish	Playoff results
Louisiana Bayou Beast (PIFL)
1998	15	1	0	1st League	Won Semifinal (Colorado); Won PIFL Championship (Madison)
Louisiana Bayou Beast (IPFL)
1999	6	10	0	5th League	--
2000	played as Louisiana Rangers (NIFL)				
Louisiana Bayou Beast (NIFL)
2001	1	13	0	6th AC Southern	--
Totals	22	24	0	(including playoffs)	

== Bayou Beast head coaches ==
- 1998: Buford Jordan, 15-1 (PIFL Head Coach of the Year)
- 1999: Jeff Major & Chris Carrier, † 2-5 (week #1-7)
- 1999: Ted "Rock" Knapp, 2-3 (week #9-13)
- 1999: Barrett Murphy, 2-2 (week #14-17)
- 2001: Don Shows, 0-7 (week #1-9)
- 2001: John Fourcade, 1-6 (week #10-16)

† Co-Head Coaches of the Bayou Beast

== Notable Bayou Beast players ==
- 1998–99: Michael Lewis (WR)‡
- 1998–99: Doug Coleman (QB)
- 1998–99: Melvin Hill (QB) – PIFL League MVP for '98
- 1998–99: James Hemphill (LB)
- 1998–99: Scott Leavell (QB/WR)
- 1998–99: James Shiver, Jr. (WR) – son of the Bayou Beast owners
- 1998: Matt Huerkamp (K)‡
- 1998: Chris Cloud (C)‡
- 1999: Derrick Fobb (WR)
- 1999: Joe Valencia (WR)
- 1999: Chris Beard (DB)†
- 2001: Ben Rogers (K)
- 2001: John Fourcade (QB) – former New Orleans Saints QB, signed to team after week #7, then promoted to head coach
- 1999: Terry Ducote (QB)

Player/Head Coach to finish season out

† Beard was paralyzed in a game on June 6, 1999 against the Texas Terminators.

‡ These players were selected to the PIFL All-Star 1st Team.
