= Utah Catzz =

Utah Catzz
Founded	1998
Folded	1998
Arena	David O. McKay Events Center
Based in	Orem, UT
Colors	Blue, Red, and Purple
League	Professional Indoor Football League
Head coach	Gordon Hudson
Owner	Mack "Truck" Fulton

The Utah Catzz was a team in the United States Professional Indoor Football League (PIFL) in 1998. The Catzz franchise was owned by Mack Fulton, who also started a farm club for the Catzz, the Salt Lake Lions (semi-pro football team). The Catzz played their home games at the David O. McKay Events Center in Orem, UT., with the team office located in Salt Lake City, UT. The team's color's were: Blue, Red, and Purple. Utah's head coach for the 1998 season was Gordon Hudson.

The Catzz played four preseason PIFL games in 1997-98. Winning three out of the four:

- December 6, 1997 - Utah Catzz 41 at West Virginia Wizards 51†
- December 20, 1997 - Texas Bullets 22 at Utah Catzz 47
- March 21, 1998 - Tucson Mirage† 23 at Utah Catzz 59
- April 4, 1998 - Utah Catzz 42 at Louisiana Bayou Beast 40

† was scheduled to be an expansion team for the 1999 season.

== Season-by-season ==
Season records
Season	W	L	T	Finish	Playoff results
1998	5	9	0	6th League	--

== Utah Catzz 1998 schedule ==

- April 11 - Minnesota Monsters 30, at Utah Catzz 32
- April 18 - Texas Bullets 24, at Utah Catzz 57
- April 26 - Utah Catzz 27, at Colorado Wildcats 29
- May 9 - Madison Mad Dogs 49, at Utah Catzz 27
- May 16 - Louisiana Bayou Beast 44, at Utah Catzz 14
- May 23 - Colorado Wildcats 43, at Utah Catzz 26
- May 30 - Utah Catzz at Minnesota Monsters - Minnesota forfeits
- June 6 - Utah Catzz 37, at Green Bay Bombers 47
- June 20 - Utah Catzz 16, at Louisiana Bayou Beast 43
- June 27 - Honolulu Hurricanes 50, at Utah Catzz 52
- July 4 - Green Bay Bombers 61, at Utah Catzz 43
- July 18 - Utah Catzz at Texas Bullets - Texas forfeits
- July 25 - Utah Catzz 12, at Honolulu Hurricanes 42
- August 1 - Utah Catzz at Madison Mad Dogs - Utah forfeits
