= Jim Hobbins =

American football player (born 1964)

No. 78
- Position: Guard

Personal information
- Born: June 4, 1964 (age 62); Green Bay, Wisconsin, U.S.
- Listed height: 6 ft 6 in (1.98 m)
- Listed weight: 275 lb (125 kg)

Career information
- High school: Preble (Green Bay)
- College: Minnesota (1982–1986)
- NFL draft: 1987: undrafted

Career history
- Green Bay Packers (1987); Green Bay Bombers (1998)

Awards and highlights
- Second-team All-Big Ten (1986); Second-team All-PIFL (1998)

Career NFL statistics
- Games played: 3
- Games started: 3
- Stats at Pro Football Reference

Jim Hobbins (born June 4, 1964) is an American former professional football player who was a guard for one season in the National Football League (NFL) with the Green Bay Packers. He played college football for the Minnesota Golden Gophers and also was a member of the Green Bay Bombers in the Professional Indoor Football League (PIFL).

== Early life ==
Hobbins was born on June 4, 1964, in Green Bay, Wisconsin. He attended Preble High School in Green Bay and is one of four of their alumni to play in the NFL. He was a letterman in three sports: football, basketball and track and field. As a senior in 1981, Hobbins was named first-team all-conference on offense at tackle and second-team on defense at end; he also was selected first-team (offense) and second-team (defense) all-metro and was a second-team all-state choice. He graduated in 1982 as ninth in a class of 572.

== College career ==
Hobbins enrolled at the University of Minnesota and began playing for their Golden Gopher football team after he graduated from Preble. He had been highly recruited and joined Minnesota over offers from other schools such as Wisconsin and Iowa. He saw limited action as a true freshman but started the season finale against Wisconsin. He became a full-time starter at left tackle in the 1983 season but played for a Golden Gopher team described as "possibly the poorest collegiate team in the country."

Hobbins broke his foot on the first day of practice entering the 1984 season and missed the entire year as a redshirt. He returned as a starter in 1985 and helped Minnesota have one of the top rushing offenses nationally. As a senior in 1986, he remained a starter and was named second-team All-Big Ten Conference, also participating in the Liberty Bowl. During his time at Minnesota, Hobbins was also a first-team Academic All-Big Ten selection. He graduated with a degree in business finance.

== Professional career ==
Hobbins went unselected in the 1987 NFL draft. He was subsequently signed by the Green Bay Packers as an undrafted free agent, attempting to become the first Green Bay native to play for the Packers in 13 years. He was limited by injury throughout the offseason and was released during roster cuts. He signed a strike option contract, however, after being cut, allowing him to re-join the Packers as a replacement player when the NFLPA went on strike later that season. He made his NFL debut against the Minnesota Vikings and ultimately started all three strike games as a guard before being released, posting a fumble recovery as his only statistic.

Hobbins was then out of football until 11 years later, when he made the roster of the Green Bay Bombers in the Professional Indoor Football League (PIFL). Nicknamed "Grandpa", he was the oldest player on the team at the age of 34. He earned $200 per game with the Bombers while also working at Arbon Equipment when not playing. He was selected second-team all-league at the end of the season.

== Personal life ==
Hobbins married Amy Lou Murto in January 1986, and they had a child later that year.
