= West Virginia Wizards =

The West Virginia Wizards were announced on October 29, 1997, as a trial member of the Professional Indoor Football League (PIFL). The Wizards were scheduled to play a single exhibition game against the Utah Catzz on December 6, 1997. The PIFL commissioner, Richard "Dick" Suess, scheduled the pre-season indoor football game in Charleston, West Virginia, to gauge fan interest.

They were led by the former West Virginia University quarterback Major Harris. The Wizards' uniforms consisted of solid white helmets (no logo), yellow jerseys with green numbers, and green pants. Harris lived up to his nickname of "Mr. Excitement" in leading the West Virginia Wizards to a 41–51 comeback victory over the Utah Catzz. A crowd estimated at 7,000 attended the exhibition. Harris threw for 6 touchdowns and ran for another during this game.

There was a tryout for the Wizards on April 9, 1998, at Veterans Memorial Fieldhouse in Huntington at 7 pm. The West Virginia Wizards also were scheduled to play the Louisville Bulls in an exhibition on May 2, 1998, at the Huntington Civic Center. It is not known if this game took place.

Once the PIFL was official organized in 1998, they were no longer a part of the league.
