= State Fair Coliseum =

State Fair Coliseum may refer to:

- Fair Park Coliseum (Dallas, Texas)
- Indiana Farmers Coliseum, formerly known as State Fair Coliseum
- Lee & Rose Warner Coliseum, formerly known as Minnesota State Fair Coliseum
- Michigan State Fairgrounds Coliseum, hosts the Michigan State Fair
- Oklahoma State Fair Arena, formerly known as State Fair Coliseum
- State Fair Coliseum (Syracuse, New York), former arena of the Syracuse Nationals
