= Brian Ah Yat =

American gridiron football player (born 1975)

No. 10, 12
- Position: Quarterback

Personal information
- Born: November 12, 1975 (age 50); Honolulu, Hawaii, U.S.
- Listed height: 6 ft 0 in (1.83 m)
- Listed weight: 190 lb (86 kg)

Career information
- High school: ʻIolani School (Honolulu)
- College: Montana (1995–1998)
- NFL draft: 1999: undrafted

Career history
- Hawaii Hammerheads (1999); Winnipeg Blue Bombers (1999–2001); Chicago Rush (2003)

Awards and highlights
- NCAA Division I-AA national champion (1995); 2× Big Sky Offensive MVP (1996, 1998); 2× First-team All-Big Sky (1996, 1998); Second-team All-Big Sky (1997)
- Stats at ArenaFan.com

Brian Ah Yat (born November 12, 1975) is an American former professional football quarterback who played three seasons with the Winnipeg Blue Bombers of the Canadian Football League (CFL). He played college football at the University of Montana. He was also a member of the Hawaii Hammerheads and Chicago Rush.

== Early life ==
Brian Ah Yat was born November 21, 1975, in Honolulu, Hawaii. He attended ʻIolani School in Honolulu.

== College career ==
Ah Yat was a four-year letterman for the Montana Grizzlies of the University of Montana from 1995 to 1998. He was a backup to Dave Dickenson when the 1995 Grizzlies won the NCAA Division I-AA national championship. Ah Yat was then a three-year starter from 1996 to 1998. He recorded 3,744 yards of total offense and a conference-record 42 touchdown passes in 1996, earning first-team All-Big Sky Conference and Big Sky Offensive MVP honors. He also set a school record for passing yards in a game that season with 560 yards against Eastern Washington. He led the 1996 Grizzlies to the 1996 NCAA Division I-AA Football Championship Game, where they lost to Marshall by a score of 49–29. He was named second-team All-Big Sky in 1997. As a senior in 1998, Ah Yat once again earned first-team All-Big Sky and Big Sky Offensive MVP honors after leading the conference in total offense for the second time with 2,944 yards and also scoring 26 passing touchdowns. He totaled 9,320 yards of offense during his college career and led the Grizzlies to the playoffs all three seasons he was a starter. He played in the Hula Bowl after his senior season. He was inducted into the school's athletics hall of fame in 2021.

== Professional career ==
After going undrafted in the 1999 NFL draft, Ah Yat played for the Hawaii Hammerheads of the Indoor Professional Football League in 1999.

In May 1999, Ah Yat left the Hammerheads to sign with the Winnipeg Blue Bombers of the Canadian Football League (CFL). He dressed in all 18 games for the Blue Bombers during the 1999 CFL season and threw two incomplete passes. He dressed in nine games in 2000 but did not record any statistics. Ah Yat dressed in 18 games for the second season, starting one, in 2001, completing 14 of 27 passes (51.9%) for 188 yards, two touchdowns, and two interceptions. He became a free agent in February 2002.

Ah Yat signed with the Chicago Rush of the Arena Football League on December 5, 2002. He played in two games, starting one, for the Rush during the 2002 season, completing three of 12 passes (25.0%) for 43 yards, one touchdown, and one interception.

== Coaching career ==
Ah Yat has spent time as a high school football coach in Hawaii, including stints as the offensive coordinator and quarterbacks coach at Damien Memorial School, and the quarterbacks coach at Kamehameha High School.

== Personal life ==
As of 2021, Ah Yat was working at a radiology facility. He and his family also previously owned a bakery company in Montana.

As of 2024, his son Keali’i Ah Yat is University of Montana's quarterback.
