= Syracuse Blitz =

General information
- Founded: 1998
- Folded: 1999
- Headquartered: Syracuse, New York
- Colors: Black

Personnel
- Owners: Don Angelo; Bryan Perry

Team history
- Syracuse Blitz (1998)

League / conference affiliations
- Professional Indoor Football League (1998)

The Syracuse Blitz was a Professional Indoor Football League (PIFL) team that played one exhibition game in 1998 and was going to join the league officially in 1999.

The franchise was originally awarded to Buffalo, NY as the Buffalo Blitz on June 16, 1997. The move was part of a rush brought on by the threat of the Buffalo Bills' lease expiration, which had led to speculation that the Bills would leave Buffalo (speculation that turned out to be unfounded as an extension was reached). The Blitz was owned by Don Angelo, Bryan Perry, and a group of area investors. At that time, they were negotiating with the University at Buffalo & Buffalo State College for playing sites for the upcoming PIFL season. In September of '97, the Arena Football League announced their next franchise would be in Buffalo also, later on known as the Buffalo Destroyers. This forced the move of the PIFL "Blitz" to Syracuse, NY.

After one scheduled tryout (Feb. 21, 1998), the Syracuse Blitz did not come together in time for the 1998 PIFL season, so the team had changed their plans to enter the league in 1999. The "Blitz" in fact did play one exhibition game against the Louisiana Bayou Beast at the Pete Maravich Assembly Center on the Louisiana State University campus in Baton Rouge, LA on July 4, 1998. The Beast won the exhibition game 39–18. The "Blitz" wore all black uniforms with all black helmets (no logos used).

The Syracuse Blitz never did take to the field in the 1999 regular season, as the league changed its name to the Indoor Professional Football League that season.

Twenty years after the original Buffalo Blitz were proposed, the Buffalo Lightning indoor football team (itself an offshoot of the long-established Buffalo Gladiators semi-pro squad) rebranded itself as the Buffalo Blitz.
