= Utah Community Credit Union =

Credit union based in Provo, Utah

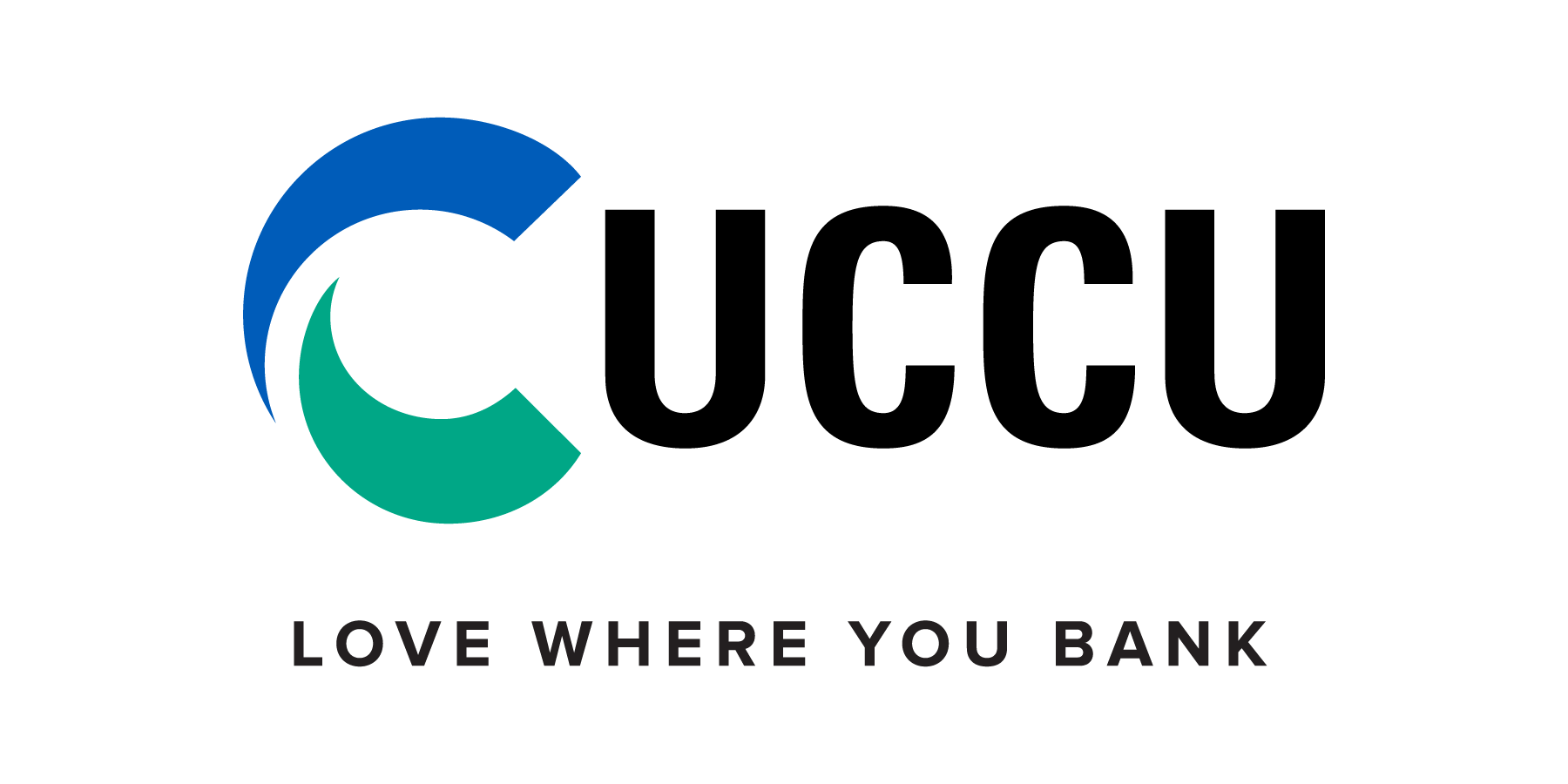
- Type: Credit union
- Industry: Financial services
- Founded: 1955; 71 years ago
- Headquarters: Provo, Utah, United States
- Key people: Justin Olson (CEO)
- Products: Savings; Checking; Consumer Loans; Mortgages; Credit Cards; Online Banking
- Total assets: $3 billion (2024)
- Number of employees: 525 (2024)
- Website: www.uccu.com

Utah Community Credit Union (UCCU) is a federally chartered credit union headquartered in Provo, Utah, regulated under the authority of the National Credit Union Administration (NCUA).

== History ==
UCCU was founded in 1955 as the BYU Employees' Federal Credit Union at Brigham Young University (BYU) in Provo, Utah, by seven individuals who recognized the need for a not-for-profit financial institution that would be owned by its members and prioritize their financial well-being.

In 1977, the credit union moved off campus when it opened its first official branch on Canyon Road in Provo and changed its name to Universal Campus Federal Credit Union.

In 2000, the credit union changed its name to Utah Community Federal Credit Union (UCCU) to better reflect its growing membership throughout the state of Utah. It also expanded its field of membership to include anyone who lives, works, attends school, or worships in Utah County.

In 2008, UCCU partnered with Utah Valley University (UVU) in Orem, Utah to provide the convenience of combining the UVU Campus ID and a UCCU VISA Debit into one card (UVU PlusCard). The UVU partnership expanded through acquiring the naming rights to the UCCU Center (2010) and the UCCU Stadium (coming 2025).

== Community Involvement ==
The credit union’s commitment to community involvement is ingrained in its name and mission. UCCU actively supports local events and charitable organizations like United Way, Boys and Girls Club of Utah County, Make A Wish Foundation, and Kids on the Move.

== Awards ==
The credit union has won multiple awards throughout the years from credible companies including the corporate partner of they year in 2022 with United Way, newspaper awards from The Salt Lake Tribune, 2023 Great Rates Award from Datatrac, and more including Q2, Forbes.

== Membership ==
UCCU is a member oriented financial cooperative dedicated to the ideal of “People Helping People.” As such, the credit union attempts to foster a sense of ownership and shared success among its members.

Although the majority of its members are found in Utah, anyone can join UCCU.
