= UCCU Center =

Multi-purpose arena in Orem, Utah, United States

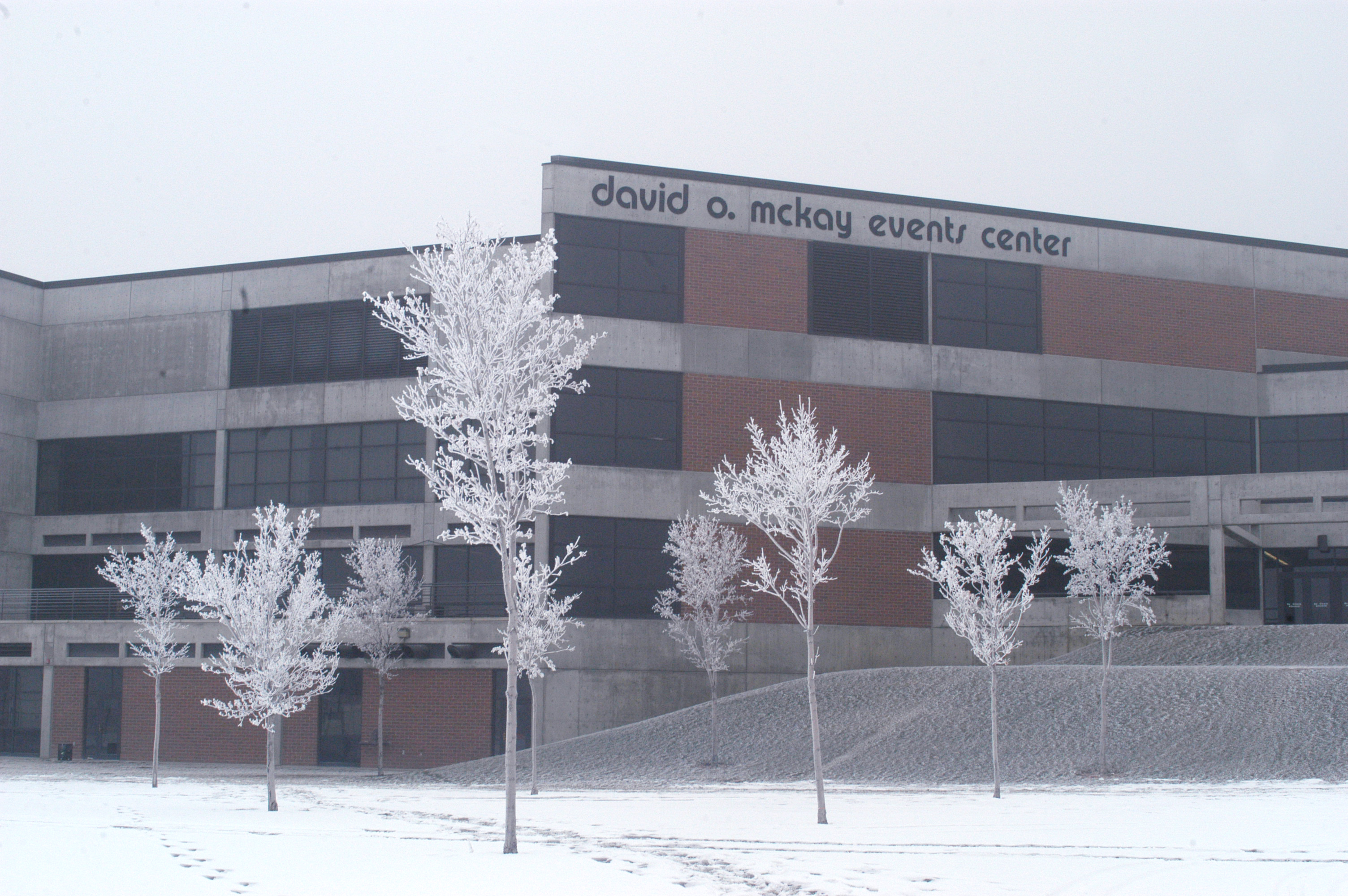
- Exterior of arena under former signage, January 2004
- Interactive map of UCCU Center
- Former names: UVSC McKay Special Events Center (planning/construction); McKay Events Center (1996–2010)
- Address: 800 West University Parkway; Orem, Utah; United States
- Location: Utah Valley University
- Coordinates: 40.278724°N 111.716956°W
- Owner: Utah Valley University
- Capacity: 8,500
- Public transit: UVX (at UVU station)

Construction
- Opened: January 26, 1996
- Renovated: 2007
- Cost: $27.7 million ($55.4 million in 2025 dollars)
- Architect: FFKR Architects
- Structural engineer: Reaveley Engineers + Associates
- Services engineer: Heath Engineering Company

Tenants
- Utah Valley Wolverines (WAC) (1996–present); Utah Catzz (PIFL) (1998); Utah Flash (NBA D-League) (2007–11); Utah Valley Thunder (AIFA) (2009)

Website
- www.uccucenter.com

UCCU Center (previously known as the McKay Events Center from 1996 to 2010) is a multi-purpose arena on the campus of Utah Valley University (UVU) in Orem, Utah, United States. It was built in 1996 and is home to the Utah Valley Wolverines basketball team.

== History ==
In 1991, the Utah State Legislature passed a law allowing county governments to implement a 1% restaurant tax in order to support tourism and recreational facilities. In April that year, Utah County voters approved a 20-year bond and 1% restaurant sales tax to raise $7.7 million for a multipurpose events center. The measure passed by more than a 2–1 margin with an 8.7% voter turnout.

In December 1993, Utah Valley State College (now UVU) held a ground breaking ceremony for the Center. Officials in attendance included college president Kerry D. Romesburg and Utah County Commissioner Gary Herbert.

Construction began in January 1994 and finished in January 1996 for a total of US$27,700,000. The Center opened with 8,500 seats and 25,000 square feet (2,300 m^{2}) of floor space. On January 27, 1996, former First Lady Barbara Bush was the keynote speaker at the Center's debut event, a conference titled "In Honor of Women".

In April 1996, the Center was dedicated and officially named in honor of David O. McKay.

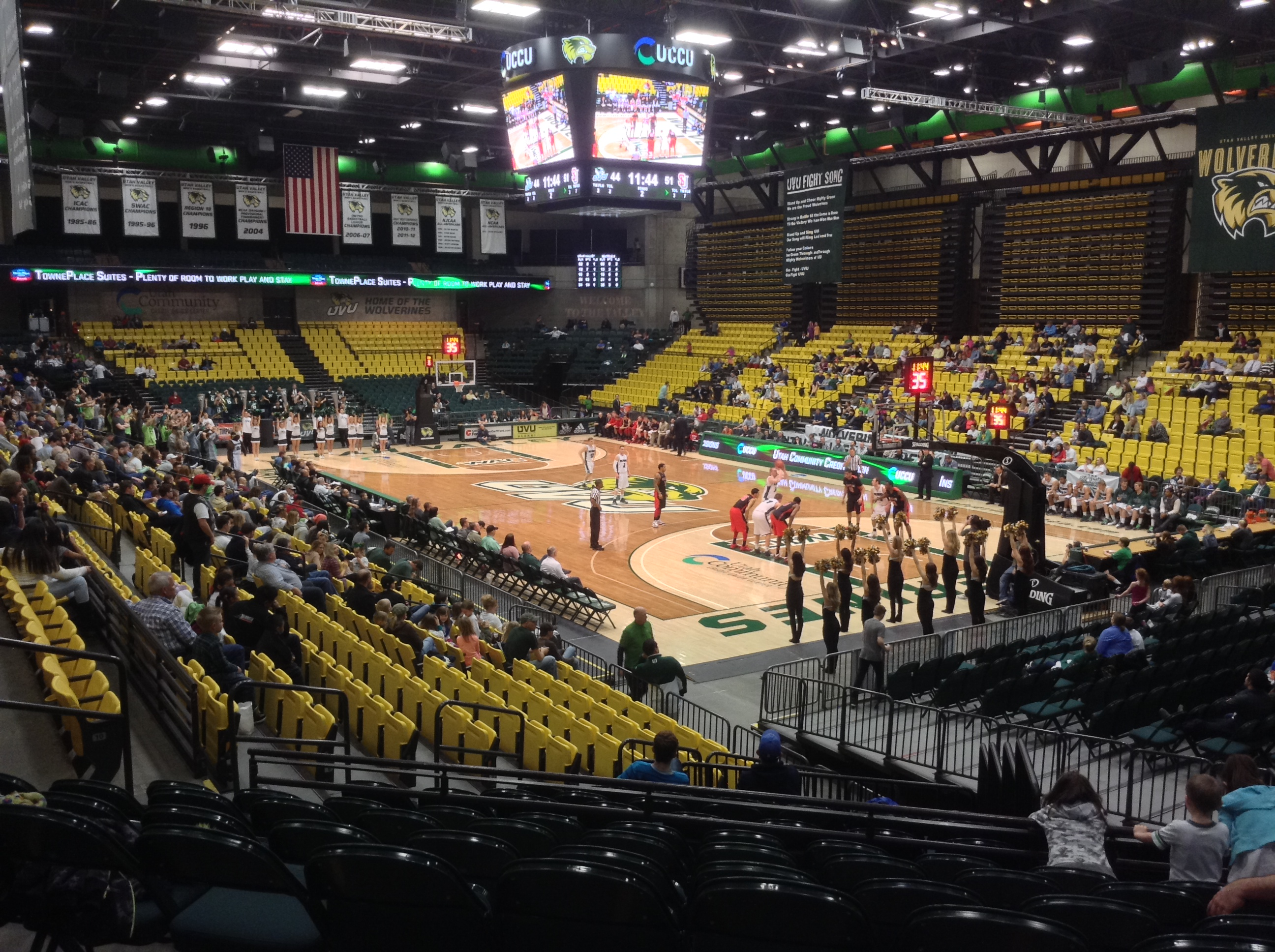
Interior

On January 19, 2010, UVU announced its plans to sell the naming rights to the arena at the request of the donor family, to help the university raise money. At the same time, the university named its education building after David O. McKay. On August 30, 2010, Utah Community Credit Union (UCCU) announced it acquired the naming rights to the arena.

The UCCU Center has grown to host many top touring shows such as ZZ Top, Boston, Lonestar, Styx, Maroon 5, Lifehouse, INXS, OneRepublic, Jimmy Eat World, Paramore, Fall Out Boy, Kelly Clarkson and more recently The Killers, Phillip Phillips, Pentatonix, Panic! at the Disco and Bastille.

The Center is the former home of the minor league professional sports teams including the Utah Flash (defunct D-League affiliate team of the Utah Jazz), the Utah Valley Thunder (defunct American Indoor Football Association team), and the Utah Catzz of the Professional Indoor Football League.

== Concerts ==
Bastille brought their Bad Blood: The Last Stand Tour to the arena on November 11, 2014.

Fall Out Boy & Paramore brought their co-headlining tour, Monumentour, to the arena on August 13, 2014, with New Politics as the opening act.

Panic! at the Disco brought their Death of a Bachelor Tour to the arena on March 18, 2017, with MisterWives and Saint Motel as the opening acts.

Bastille brought their Wild, Wild World Tour to the arena on April 13, 2017, with Mondo Cozmo as the opening act.

Paramore brought their After Laughter tour to the arena on September 22, 2017, with Best Coast as the opening act.

Louis Tomlinson brought his Louis Tomlinson World Tour to the arena on March 1, 2022, with Sun Room as the opening act.

Olivia Rodrigo brought her Sour Tour to the arena on April 9, 2022, with Gracie Abrams as the opening act.

== See also ==
- List of NCAA Division I basketball arenas
