= Wichita Stealth =

Arena football team

Logo

General information
- Founded: 1999
- Folded: 2004
- Headquartered: Kansas Coliseum in Wichita, Kansas
- Colors: Midnight blue, gold, black

Team history
- Wichita Warlords (2000); Wichita Stealth (2001–2004)

Home fields
- Kansas Coliseum (2000–2004)

League / conference affiliations
- Indoor Football League (2000): Western Conference (2000); Southern Division (2000); AF2 (2001–2004): National Conference (2001–2004); Midwestern Division (2001–2002); Western Division (2003); Southwestern Division (2004)

Playoff appearances (2)
- 2002, 2003

The Wichita Stealth was an arena football team. They played their home games at the Kansas Coliseum in Wichita, Kansas. They originally began play in the original incarnation of the Indoor Football League as a 2000 expansion team known as the Wichita Warlords before the league folded, in which they moved to the AF2 and became the Stealth. They only got to the playoffs once during their five-year existence, where they had an early exit (courtesy of the Hawaiian Islanders). After an 8–8 season in 2004, the team officially disbanded and ceased all operations. After Intrust Bank Arena opened, there were rumors that the Stealth might be reincarnated, but the talks died down, and nothing ever surfaced. Now the Wichita Force of Champions Indoor Football, play there.

== Season-by-season ==
Season records
Season	W	L	T	Finish	Playoff results
Wichita Warlords (IFL)
2000	4	10	0	5th WC Southern	--
Wichita Stealth (af2)
2001	7	9	0	5th NC Midwestern	--
2002	6	10	0	3rd NC Midwestern	Lost Round 1 (Peoria 37, Wichita 36)
2003	8	7	1	3rd NC Western	Lost Round 1 (Hawaiian 57, Wichita 30)
2004	8	8	0	3rd NC Southwestern	--
Totals	33	47	1	(including playoffs)	
