= Colorado Wildcats =

1998 indoor American football team

General information
- Founded: 1997
- Folded: 1998
- Headquartered: Denver Coliseum in Denver, Colorado
- Colors: Old Gold, Purple, White

Personnel
- Owner: Tom Shafer
- Head coach: Collins Sanders

Team history
- Colorado Wildcats (1998)

Home fields
- Denver Coliseum (1998)

League / conference affiliations
- Professional Indoor Football League (1998)

Playoff appearances (1)
- 1998

The Colorado Wildcats was a team in the Professional Indoor Football League (PIFL) in 1998. The Wildcats franchise was owned by Gary Kozacek, who also was head coach/owner of the same Wildcats team for the previous 9 years, as they competed in semi-pro football in and around Colorado. The Wildcats played their home games at the Denver Coliseum, with the team office also located in Denver, CO. The team's colors were: Old Gold, Purple, and White. Colorado's head coach listed in the 1998 PIFL league media guide was Larry Jobe, but the actual head coach was Collins Sanders.

The Wildcats played three preseason PIFL games in '98. They went 1–2 in those games, with the lone victory at home:

- March 19 - Colorado Wildcats 20 at Madison Mad Dogs 27
- March 25 - Colorado Wildcats 39 at Green Bay Bombers 53
- April 6 - Texas Bullets 9 at Colorado Wildcats 49

The Wildcats compiled a 9–5 record in their only year of play. They struggled financially, even folding for two weeks before a new owner, Tom Shafer, bailed the team out and allowed them to finish the season. The team made the playoffs, but even with the new owner in place, the Wildcats were still financially strapped and were about to forfeit their playoff appearance, rather than pay travel costs to Baton Rouge, LA. The Shivers, the Louisiana Bayou Beast owners, offered to pay travel expenses for the Wildcats to compete against the Beast. This would also be the Beasts' chance to avenge the only loss of the Bayou Beast season (13–1) by defeating the Wildcats in the playoffs. The Bayou Beast did just that by winning 67–61, slamming Colorado wide receiver Matt Cinquanta to the turf as he made a miraculous catch just one yard shy of the endzone on the game's last play. As a result, the Louisiana Bayou Beast advanced to the PIFL Championship game.

When Green Bay Bombers and Madison Mad Dogs owner Keary Ecklund announced his intentions to start a new league in 1999, Indoor Football League (IFL), Shafer stood by him and proclaimed the Wildcats would be a part of the IFL. Although the Colorado Wildcats ceased operations, much of the roster and staff transitioned to become the Rocky Mountain Thunder, competing in the newly-formed Indoor Professional Football League (IPFL) for the 1999 season.

== Colorado Wildcats 1998 schedule ==
April 11 - Honolulu Hurricanes 37, at Colorado Wildcats 48
April 26 - Utah Catzz 27, at Colorado Wildcats 29
May 9 - Louisiana Bayou Beast 41, at Colorado Wildcats 49
May 16 - Colorado Wildcats at Minnesota Monsters - Minnesota forfeits
May 23 - Colorado Wildcats 43, at Utah Catzz 26
May 30 - Colorado Wildcats 42, at Honolulu Hurricanes 34
June 7 - Texas Bullets 28, at Colorado Wildcats 51
June 20 - Green Bay Bombers 45, at Colorado Wildcats 38
June 27 - Minnesota Monsters at Colorado Wildcats - Minnesota forfeits
July 4 - Madison Mad Dogs at Colorado Wildcats - Colorado forfeits
July 11 - Colorado Wildcats 22, at Louisiana Bayou Beast 31
July 18 - Colorado Wildcats 18, at Madison Mad Dogs 54
July 25 - Colorado Wildcats 0, at Green Bay Bombers 45
August 1 - Colorado Wildcats at Texas Bullets - Texas forfeits

=== Playoffs ===
August 9 - Colorado Wildcats 61, at Louisiana Bayou Beast 67

- Held at the Riverside Centroplex instead of the Bayou Beast home arena, Pete Maravich Assembly Center
