= Bismarck Blaze =

General information
- Founded: 1999
- Folded: 2000
- Headquartered: Bismarck Event Center in Bismarck, North Dakota
- Colors: Blue, red, gold, white

Team history
- Bismarck Blaze (2000)

Home fields
- Bismarck Event Center (2000)

League / conference affiliations
- Indoor Football League (2000): Western Conference (2000); Northern Division (2000)

Championships
- Conference championships: 1; 2000

Playoff appearances (1)
- 2000

The Bismarck Blaze were a professional indoor American football team based in Bismarck, North Dakota. They were members of the original Indoor Football League founded in 1999 and began play in 2000. They competed in the Northern Division of the Western Conference.

== History ==
The Blaze were founded as an expansion team in 1999 and joined the original incarnation of the Indoor Football League along with several others expansion franchises. In the only season in the IFL, the team compiled an 11–3 record finishing in first place in the Western Conference and qualified for the IFL Gold Cup playoffs. They defeated the Sioux City Attack 30–14 in the second round of the playoffs, then the Topeka Kings 51–-27 in the semifinals advancing to the 2000 Gold Cup, only to lose to the Peoria Pirates in the championship game 69–42.

After the IFL was bought out by af2, the Blaze were not among the many teams that moved to the new league and subsequently folded. However, a new franchise resurfaced in Bismarck to play in the National Indoor Football League for the 2002 and 2003 seasons.
