= Minnesota Monsters =

Defunct indoor American football team

Logo

General information
- Founded: 1998
- Folded: 1998
- Headquartered: Falcon Heights, Minnesota at the Warner Coliseum
- Colors: Blue, Black & White

Personnel
- Owners: Robert & Joann Edwards
- Head coach: Ron Simmons

Team history
- Minnesota Monsters (1998)

Home fields
- State Fair Coliseum (1998)

League / conference affiliations
- Professional Indoor Football League (1998)

The Minnesota Monsters were an indoor football team based in Falcon Heights, Minnesota. The Monsters were charter members of the original Professional Indoor Football League (PIFL) in 1998. The Monsters franchise was owned by Robert and Joann Edwards. The team office was based in Minneapolis-St. Paul, Minnesota, and played their games at the Coliseum on the Minnesota State Fairgrounds. The team colors were: Blue, Black, and White/Gold. The Monsters were coached by Ron Simmons for the few PIFL games they did participate in.

The Monsters played two preseason PIFL games in '98. Both were victories at home:

- March 7 - Green Bay Bombers 32 at Minnesota Monsters 35
- March 28 - Madison Mad Dogs 29 at Minnesota Monsters 33

Minnesota's first three PIFL regular season games were losses. Then, the Monsters forfeited a home game scheduled against the Colorado Wildcats on May 16, 1998. The following weekend, on May 22, 1998, a road trip game at the Honolulu Hurricanes was on the schedule. Due to a shipping error, the Monsters had to play the first half of the game wearing the Hurricanes' road uniforms. Minnesota actually got their lone regular season victory in that game. The victory was taken away by the league president for unpaid bills. The team was officially folded on May 28, 1998.

After forfeiting another home game the following weekend against the Utah Catzz, The Monsters lost to Madison 20-36. The league ruled this game as an "exhibition game" for the standing purposes. From that point on, all remaining Minnesota Monsters games were ruled to be forfeits.

== Minnesota Monsters 1998 schedule ==
- April 11 - Minnesota Monsters 30, at Utah Catzz 32
- May 2 - Minnesota Monsters 40, at Green Bay Bombers 55
- May 9 - Minnesota Monsters 32, at Texas Bullets 34 (OT)
- May 16 - Colorado Wildcats at Minnesota Monsters - Minnesota forfeits
- May 22 - Minnesota Monsters 42‡, at Honolulu Hurricanes 20 - Minnesota forfeits
- May 30 - Utah Catzz at Minnesota Monsters - Minnesota forfeits
- June 6 - Minnesota Monsters 20†, at Madison Mad Dogs 36
- June 13 - Madison Mad Dogs at Minnesota Monsters - Minnesota forfeits
- June 27 - Minnesota Monsters at Colorado Wildcats - Minnesota forfeits
- July 4 - Minnesota Monsters at Louisiana Bayou Beast - Minnesota forfeits
- July 11 - Honolulu Hurricanes at Minnesota Monsters - Minnesota forfeits
- July 19 - Louisiana Bayou Beast at Minnesota Monsters - Minnesota forfeits
- July 26 - Texas Bullets at Minnesota Monsters - both teams forfeit
- July 31 - Green Bay Bombers at Minnesota Monsters - Minnesota forfeits

† Exhibition Game

‡ victory was taken away by the league president for unpaid bills
