= Pershing Center =

Arena in Lincoln, Nebraska, U.S.

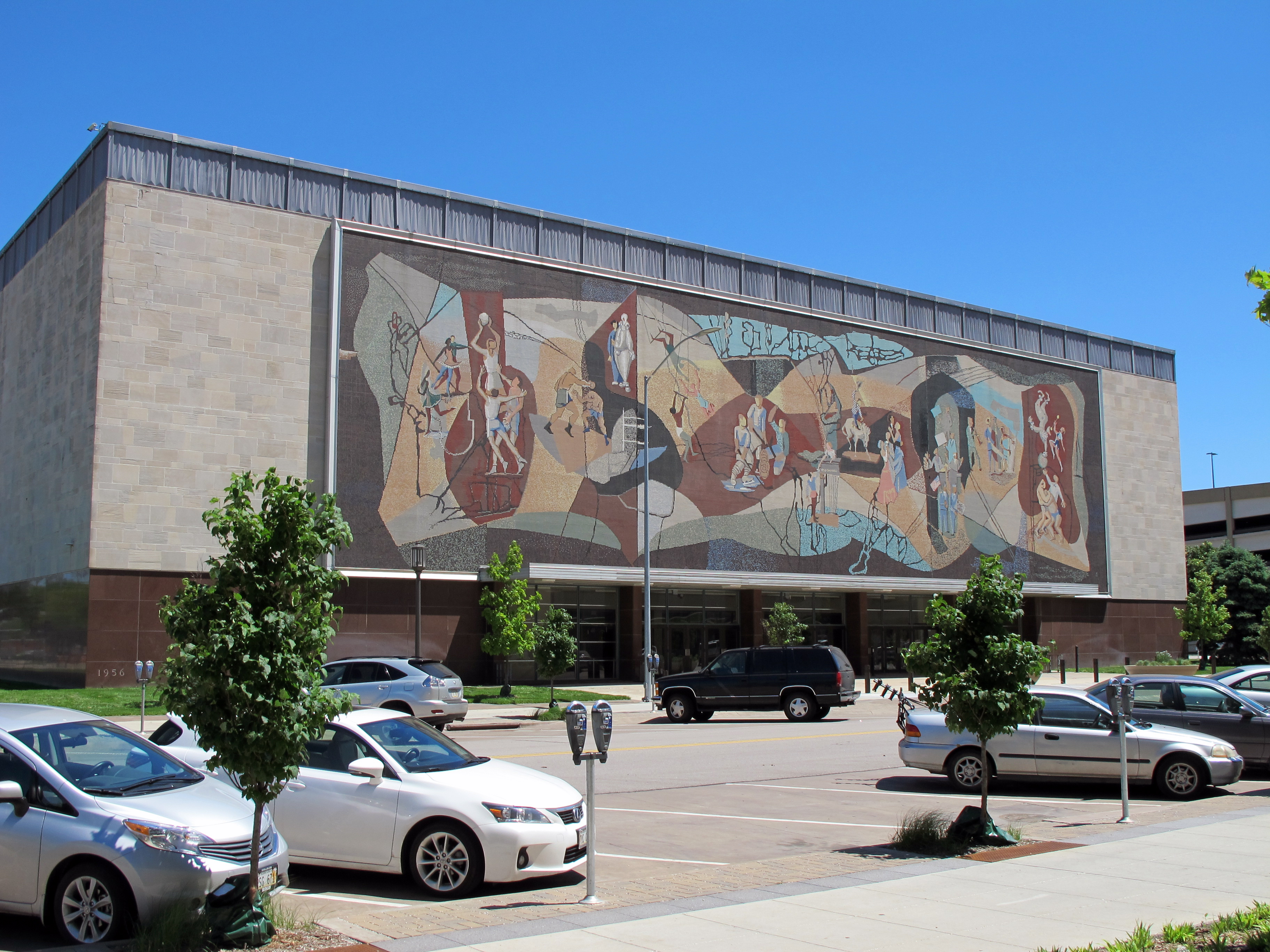
- Pershing Center in 2015
- Interactive map of Pershing Center
- Former names: Pershing Auditorium
- Location: 226 Centennial Mall South, Lincoln, Nebraska, U.S.
- Coordinates: 40°48′42″N 96°41′55″W
- Owner: City of Lincoln
- Operator: SMG
- Capacity: 4,526
- Public transit: StarTran

Construction
- Groundbreaking: 1955
- Opened: March 10, 1957
- Closed: August 23, 2014
- Demolished: August–September 2023
- Cost: $1.5 million

Tenants
- Lincoln Capitols (NIFL) (2002–2006); No Coast Derby Girls (WFTDA) (2005–2014); Lincoln Haymakers (CPIFL) (2013–2014)

Website
- www.pershingcenter.com (offline)

The Pershing Center (originally known as Pershing Auditorium) was a 4,526-seat multi-purpose arena in Lincoln, Nebraska, United States. The arena opened on March 10, 1957 and was named after General John J. Pershing. Tenants included indoor football teams, Lincoln Capitols, Lincoln Haymakers, and roller derby team No Coast Roller Derby. The arena was demolished in August 2023.

== History ==
Pershing Center was preceded by Lincoln's first municipal auditorium. Owned by Lancaster County and operated by the local chapter of the American Legion, the auditorium opened on February 13, 1900. However, on April 16, 1928, the building was destroyed by an accidental fire. The auditorium was replaced by a new facility at Tenth and M streets, which opened in March 1930.

While bond issues to build a city-owned auditorium were passed in 1939 and 1950, the auditorium went through extensive delays, with multiple disputes on which site to develop. The auditorium was officially named after General John J. Pershing in 1943. Plans were finalized in 1955, and the auditorium began construction later that same year. The auditorium officially opened on March 10, 1957. On May 4, 1959, a time capsule was placed under the building. It was meant to be opened on May 4, 2059.

=== Replacement ===
In 2008–2009, discussions began to build a new, larger arena for Lincoln due to mid-sized arenas no longer able to meet the demands of most tours. According to Pershing General Manager Tom Lorenz "the music and entertainment industry has pulled back on midlevel tours, reducing the number of shows likely to come to Pershing. Normally, Pershing has six to eight concerts annually, but this year will have three or four". A subsidy to cover a budget shortfall of $150,000 was passed by the Lincoln City Council because the situation was so dire, only "10 months into the fiscal year." The larger arena in Lincoln's Haymarket District was ultimately built between 2011 and 2013, opening as Pinnacle Bank Arena in August 2013.

The final major event, a concert by Goo Goo Dolls, was held at the Pershing Center August 6, 2014. The last usage of the building was a roller derby match August 23, 2014, between the No Coast Derby Girls and the Kansas City Roller Warriors; it was won by the Kansas City Roller Warriors.

=== Attempts at reuse and demolition ===
An RfP was sent out by the City of Lincoln in 2014 looking for reuse plans for the Pershing Center, but none of the proposals were acceptable due to cost. Demolition loomed in the building's future if an alternate use was not found. The contents of the Pershing Center were auctioned off in January–February 2015.

By 2018, the auditorium's future was still unclear. It remained standing and was used only as a storage facility for Pinnacle Bank Arena. Many proposals were floated by private groups and government agencies, but none that the city government (who did not at the time plan to demolish the building) found acceptable.

In June 2020, it was announced that the Pershing Center would be demolished, and would be replaced with an apartment complex and a new library. Members of the community voiced their desire to save the large, iconic mural on the auditorium's exterior. The mural was taken down and preserved by the Nebraska State Historical Society Foundation in October 2022 and was reinstalled at the Wyuka Cemetery.

Before demolition, the time capsule was opened 36 years early in March 2023. Demolition on the building began in August 2023 and construction of an apartment building on the site began in October 2024.

== Mural ==
Pershing's exterior was highlighted by a large ceramic tile mural, designed by artists Leonard Thiessen and Bill J. Hammon. The mural depicts 38 figures playing sports, dancing, and performing in theater and circus events. Measuring 38-by-140 foot (5320 sq. ft.; 494.2 m^{2}) and consisting of 763,000 one-square-inch pieces, it was the largest ceramic tile mural in the United States at the time of its construction.

After demolition of Pershing Center was announced, many citizens of Lincoln voiced their support for preserving the mural. Estimates placed preservation and reinstallation of the mural elsewhere at $1.2 million. The mural was taken down and preserved by the Nebraska State Historical Society Foundation in October 2022, with the intent to reinstall it at a then undetermined location. In 2022, it was announced that the mural would be reinstalled at the Wyuka Cemetery grounds. This process began in April 2026. On July 16, 2026, the final tile was placed, completing the reinstallation.

== Sports ==
The arena was home to the Lincoln Capitols NIFL indoor football team, the Lincoln Thunder ABA basketball team, and the No Coast Derby Girls Women's Flat Track Derby Association league. In 2013, it was home to the Lincoln Haymakers of the Champions Professional Indoor Football League. Pershing was also a host site for the NSAA boys and girls state basketball, as well as the NSAA girls volleyball championships. It has hosted the national roller-skating championships 28 times, beginning in 1962 though the final 2014 meet, called Last Lap at Pershing.

== Concerts and other events ==
Pershing has held many events in the past, including concerts and WWE/TNA house show wrestling events. The Doors played their first concert since the death of their singer Jim Morrison at Pershing on November 12, 1971. The Grateful Dead's performance, on February 26, 1973, was recorded and makes up half of their live album, entitled Dick's Picks Volume 28. The exterior and marquee of the arena are also featured in the 1981 film, This is Elvis, as it hosted one of Elvis Presley's final concerts in 1977. Phish played the arena in 1995.
