= Peoria Pirates =

Arena football team

Logo

General information
- Founded: 2001
- Folded: 2009
- Headquartered: Carver Arena in Peoria, Illinois
- Colors: Black, silver, white
- PeoriaPirates.com

Personnel
- Owners: Doug MacGregor (49%); Jim Foster
- Head coach: Bruce Cowdrey; Mike Hohensee

Team history
- Peoria Pirates (1999–2004); Peoria Rough Riders (2005–2006); Peoria Pirates (2008–2009)

Home fields
- Carver Arena (1999–2006, 2008–2009)

League / conference affiliations
- Indoor Football League (1999–2000): North Division (1999); Eastern Conference (2000); Northern Division (2000); AF2 (2001–2004): National Conference (2001–2004); Midwestern Division (2001–2004); United Indoor Football (2005–2006): Midwestern Division (2005); Central Division (2006); AF2 (2008–2009): American Conference (2008–2009); Midwest Division (2008–2009)

Championships
- League championships: 2: 2000, 2002
- Conference championships: 3: 2000, 2002, 2004
- Division championships: 3: 1999, 2000, 2002

Playoff appearances (4)
- 1999, 2000, 2002, 2004

The Peoria Pirates were a professional arena football team that last played in af2, the minor league to the Arena Football League (AFL). They played their home games at Carver Arena, part of the Peoria Civic Center in Illinois, and were coached by Mike Hohensee and Bruce Cowdrey. The Pirates originally began play as a charter member of the original Indoor Football League in 1999.

In their existence, the Pirates played in the Indoor Football League (IFL), AF2 (twice), and United Indoor Football (UIF). They also won the 2000 IFL Championship. They were also, while in the UIF, known as the Peoria Rough Riders.

== History ==
=== Indoor Football League (IFL) / AF2 ===
The Peoria Pirates were charter members of the Indoor Football League (IFL) and were also the IFL runners-up in 1999 and won the IFL championship in 2000 before their original league folded and the franchise moved over to AF2. After the move, the Pirates won ArenaCup III over the Florida Firecats, but couldn't repeat their performance the following year.

=== United Indoor Football (UIF) ===
After losing ArenaCup V to the Firecats, the franchise moved to United Indoor Football (UIF) and became the Peoria Rough Riders. Before changing team name (along with their move to the UIF), their name was the Mutineers. However, their IFL and AF2 success did not translate with their move to United Indoor Football, as they finished 6–9, then 0–15.

On September 15, 2006, the Rough Riders officially ceased operations.

=== af2 return ===
On August 22, 2007, it was announced that a new team would begin playing at Carver Arena, which would, play in AF2, assume the old Peoria Pirates name, logo, colors, and history, and have longtime head coach Bruce Cowdrey become head coach once again. The Pirates returned to play in the 2008 AF2 season.

=== 2009 closure ===
The domain of the Pirates official website expired on August 31, 2009. On September 7, 2009, the Pirates announced that they were closing down, would not play in 2010, and were selling off the team equipment later in the week. The team could not provide the required commitment and two $100,000 letters of credit by the af2s September 8 deadline for the 2010 season. Later in the week, the Peoria Journal Star noted that one of the owners of the nearby Bloomington Extreme was interested in assisting with the launch of a new Peoria team as part of a new Midwest division for the Indoor Football League.

=== Legacy ===
The Peoria Pirates fandom continues with a brand new website that was launched by Tony Johnson, producer of a documentary "They Played in Peoria" celebrating the 25th anniversary of the founding of the Pirates franchise and dedicated to its official history.

== Season-by-season ==
Season records
| Season | W | L | T | Finish | Playoff results |
|---|---|---|---|---|---|
Peoria Pirates (IFL)
| 1999 | 11 | 1 | 0 | 1st EC Northern | Won semifinal (Dayton); Lost Gold Cup I (Green Bay) |
| 2000 | 14 | 0 | 0 | 1st EC Northern | Won Round 1 (Madison); Won semifinal (Steel Valley); Won Gold Cup II (Bismarck) |
Peoria Pirates (af2)
| 2001 | 7 | 9 | 0 | 4th NC Midwestern | -- |
| 2002 | 11 | 5 | 0 | 1st NC Midwestern | Won NC Round 1 (Wichita); Won NC Semifinal (San Diego); Won NC Championship (Birmingham); Won ArenaCup III (Florida) |
| 2003 | 5 | 11 | 0 | 4th NC Midwestern | -- |
| 2004 | 9 | 7 | 0 | 3rd NC Midwestern | Won NC Round 1 (Oklahoma City); Won NC Semifinal (Bakersfield); Won NC Championship (Tulsa); Lost ArenaCup V (Florida) |
Peoria Rough Riders (UIF)
| 2005 | 6 | 9 | 0 | 3rd Midwest | -- |
| 2006 | 0 | 15 | 0 | 3rd Central | -- |
| 2007 | Did not play | | | | |
Peoria Pirates (af2)
| 2008 | 4 | 12 | 0 | 6th AC Midwest | -- |
| 2009 | 5 | 11 | 0 | 5th AC Midwest | -- |
| Totals | 79 | 76 | 0 | (including playoffs) | |
