= Erie Invaders =

Logo

General information
- Founded: 1999
- Folded: 2000
- Headquartered: Louis J. Tullio Arena in Erie, Pennsylvania
- Colors: Navy blue, sky blue, silver, white

Personnel
- General manager: Gary Tufford
- Head coach: Gary Tufford

Team history
- Erie Invaders (2000)

Home fields
- Tullio Arena (2000)

League / conference affiliations
- Indoor Football League (2000): Eastern Conference (2000); Southern Division (2000)

The Erie Invaders were a professional indoor American football team based in Erie, Pennsylvania. They were members of the original Indoor Football League founded in 1999 and began play in 2000 at Louis J. Tullio Arena in Erie. They competed in the Southern Division of the Eastern Conference. They were coached by Gary Tufford. After a 6-8 season and a defeat in the playoffs, the franchise folded because AF2 bought the IFL.

== History ==
The team was originally slated to join the original incarnation of the Indoor Football League as the Erie Xpress in 1999, but would finally join the league as the Invaders. In 2000, the team compiled a 6-8 record finishing in 2nd place in the Southern Division and would make the Eastern Conference playoffs. The Invaders would subsequently fold after their only season due to being bought by AF2. Indoor football would not be played again in Erie until 2005 when the Erie Freeze of the Atlantic Indoor Football League would be formed and play at the Erie Civic Center

== Season-by-season ==
Season records
Season	W	L	T	Finish	Playoff results
2000	6	8	0	2nd EC Southern	Lost Round 1 (Madison)
Totals	6	9	0		
