= Flint Flames =

Sports organization

General information
- Founded: 1999
- Folded: 2000
- Headquartered: Perani Arena and Event Center in Flint, Michigan
- Colors: Purple, red, orange, gold

Team history
- Flint Flames (2000)

Home fields
- Perani Arena and Event Center (2000)

League / conference affiliations
- Indoor Football League (2000): Eastern Conference (2000); Southern Division (2000)

The Flint Flames were a professional indoor American football team based in Flint, Michigan. They were members of the original Indoor Football League founded in 1999 and began play in 2000. They competed in the Southern Division of the Eastern Conference and played their home games at the Perani Arena and Event Center.

== History ==
The Flames were founded as an expansion team in 1999 and joined the original incarnation of the Indoor Football League along with several others expansion franchises. In the only season in the IFL, the team compiled a 2–14 record finishing in last place in the Eastern Conference. After the IFL was bought out by af2, the Flames were not among the many teams that moved to the new league and subsequently folded.

Years later in 2008, the Flint Phantoms began play in the Continental Indoor Football League, but quickly folded after going 1–10.
