= La Crosse River Rats =

General information
- Founded: 2000
- Folded: 2000
- Headquartered: La Crosse, Wisconsin at the La Crosse Center
- Colors: Maroon, blue, white

Team history
- La Crosse River Rats (2000)

League / conference affiliations
- Indoor Football League (2000): Eastern Conference (2000); Northern Division (2000)

Playoff appearances (0)
- 0

The La Crosse River Rats were an indoor football team based in La Crosse, Wisconsin. They were members of the original Indoor Football League (IFL) and played their home games at the La Crosse Center.

== History ==
The River Rats joined the original incarnation of the Indoor Football League as an expansion team in 1999. They began play at the La Crosse Center in 2000 and compiled a record of 2-12 in their only season in the league. Despite a dismal record, attendance was "relatively solid" according to Indoor and Arena Football History.

Members of their 2000 team included Doby Howard, Rhett Stallworth, Reggie McGee, Andrew Tyra, Mike Leaks, Marquis Gibson, Jamie Sellers, B. J. McQuillan and was coached by John Schimon and Craig Newsome, former Green Bay Packers cornerback. After Craig Newsome was let go, John Schimon became the head coach and led the team to its only 2 victories of the season.

Two years later, La Crosse was awarded a new team in the newly-formed National Indoor Football League, the La Crosse Night Train, who lasted from 2001 to 2003.
