= Lee & Rose Warner Coliseum =

Minnesota State Fair event venue

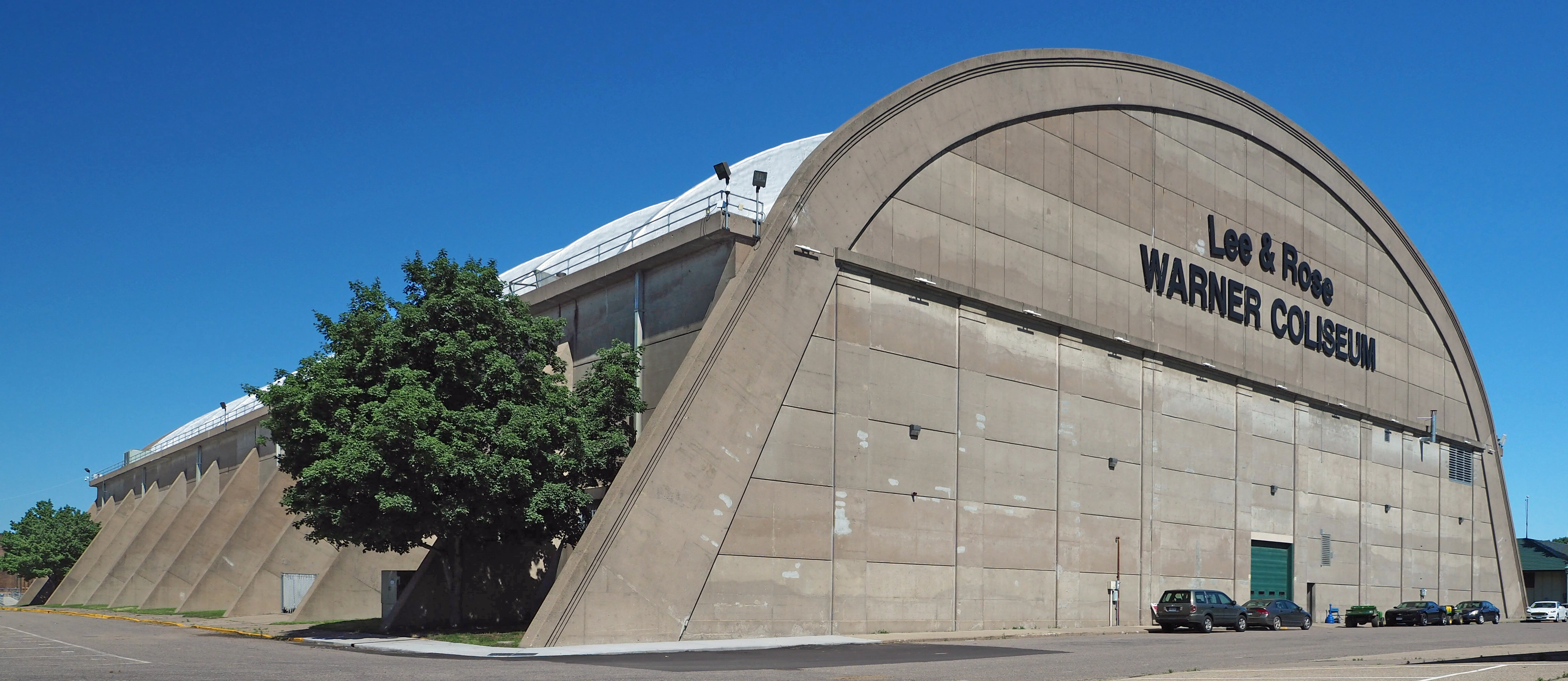
- The Lee & Rose Warner Coliseum from the southeast
- Interactive map of Lee & Rose Warner Coliseum
- Former names: Hippodrome (1951–1975); Coliseum (1975–2006)
- Address: 1784 Judson Avenue
- Location: Falcon Heights, Minnesota
- Coordinates: 44°58′41″N 93°10′28″W
- Capacity: 5,000

Construction
- Opened: 1951; 75 years ago
- Renovated: 2024–2026
- Cost: $1.2 million (equivalent to $14,900,000 in 2025)

The Lee & Rose Warner Coliseum is a 5,000-seat indoor arena in Falcon Heights, Minnesota, United States. Built in 1951 on the grounds of the Minnesota State Fair, the venue hosts indoor events of the fair such as livestock shows, dog shows, equestrian and bull riding. During the fair, vendors selling merchandise such as Western wear fill the concourse.

== History ==
The original structure on the site, the St. Paul Hippodrome, was built in 1906 and housed an indoor ice rink from 1909 to 1942. The building fell into disrepair after being used as a military aircraft propeller plant during World War II. The current structure was built in 1951 in an Art Deco style consistent with other fairgrounds buildings of the era. It continued to be known as the Hippodrome until 1975 when it was renamed Coliseum. The arena was renamed Lee & Rose Warner Coliseum in 2006. Lee Warner was Vice President of the Minnesota State Agricultural Society Board of Managers, which oversees the Minnesota State Fair, from 1919 to 1944.

On October 6, 1962, President John F. Kennedy spoke at the arena to campaign for Democratic candidates in the upcoming congressional election.

Air conditioning was added in 1975 which allowed for an ice rink in the arena. The coliseum then became popular in the winter months as a venue for high school and college ice hockey, hosting up to five games per week through the 1980s. The University of St. Thomas men's hockey team played its home games at the coliseum from 1976 until 2003. With expensive repairs needed to the arena's ice-making equipment and decline in usage, the final hockey game was played there in 2014. The last games played, within the Coliseum were high school section championships. The Centennial Cougars defeated the Blaine Bengals 2 to 1 and the Stillwater Ponies defeated the Hill-Murray Pioneers 2 to 1 to earn trips to the Minnesota State High School Hockey Tournament.

The arena has also hosted professional sports, including the Minnesota Monsters, St. Paul Fighting Saints, and North Star Roller Derby.

=== Renovation ===
Following the 2024 State Fair, the arena underwent several improvements, including a new roof, better lighting and airflow. The renovations are set to cost an estimated $22 million and will be funded in part by a $2 increase to State Fair admission tickets. The project is expected to be completed by April 2026.
