= Duluth-Superior Lumberjacks =

General information
- Founded: 1998
- Folded: 2000
- Headquartered: Duluth, Minnesota
- Colors: Royal blue, gold, black, white

Team history
- Duluth-Superior Lumberjacks (1999–2000)

Home fields
- DECC Arena (1999–2000)

League / conference affiliations
- Indoor Football League (1999–2000): North Division (1999); Eastern Conference (2000); Northern Division (2000)

Playoff appearances (0)
- none

The Duluth-Superior Lumberjacks were a professional indoor American football team based in Duluth, Minnesota. They were members of the original Indoor Football League founded in 1998 and began play in 1999. They competed in the Northern Division of the Eastern Conference.

== History ==
The Lumberjacks were founded as a charter team of the original incarnation of the Indoor Football League in 1998 along with several others franchises. In their only two seasons in the IFL, the team compiled a 1–11 record finishing in last place in the North Division in 1999 and a 2–12 record and finished in fourth in the Northern Division in the Eastern Conference and not making the playoffs in 2000. After the IFL was bought out by af2, the Lumberjacks were not among the many teams that moved to the new league and subsequently folded. They ranked among the worst teams in professional football history having been defeated by an average of 21 points a game in their first year in 1999 and 18 points a game in their final year in 2000.
