= Professional Indoor Football League (1998) =

- Sport: Indoor football
- Founded: 1997
- Founder: Dick Suess
- First season: 1998
- Folded: 1998
- No. of teams: 8
- Country: United States
- Last champion: Louisiana Bayou Beast

The Professional Indoor Football League (PIFL) was the second league to successfully play indoor football as a paid pro-league sport, after the Arena Football League (AFL). Since the AFL had a patent given in 1990 on the gameplay of "Arena Football" (mainly the endzone nets), the PIFL played with mostly the same rules, but without the endzone nets. The PIFL only lasted one season (1998) under that name.

== History ==
The PIFL was started by Richard "Dick" Suess. Suess was deeply involved in football on the semi-pro and minor league level, and was editor–publisher of the Minor League Football News. In 1996, he began shopping around the idea of the PIFL, an indoor league created from the top minor league programs around the country. The league was finally formed in late 1997 and began its first season in 1998. The league offices were located in Las Vegas, Nevada.

The PIFL was rife with problems from the start. The Colorado Wildcats changed coaches during the preseason. By the third game, many teams were in serious financial trouble and started forfeiting games. The Minnesota Monsters folded after Week 5. Many other teams missed payrolls and this resulted in many players, including some of the best players, quitting. PIFL teams had 22-man rosters and each player made $200 per game.

In 1999, the PIFL essentially "split" into two leagues. Keary Ecklund, owner of the Green Bay Bombers and Madison Mad Dogs, took his two teams and form the Indoor Football League. On January 4, 1999, the remaining teams of the PIFL renamed the league to the Indoor Professional Football League.

== 1998 PIFL season ==
=== Teams ===
| Team | City | Arena | Head coach |
|---|---|---|---|
| Colorado Wildcats | Denver, Colorado | Denver Coliseum | Collins Sanders |
| Green Bay Bombers | Green Bay, Wisconsin | Brown County Veterans Memorial Arena | Mario Russo |
| Honolulu Hurricanes | Honolulu, Hawaii | Neal S. Blaisdell Center | Sonny Souza |
| Louisiana Bayou Beast | Baton Rouge, Louisiana | Pete Maravich Assembly Center | Buford Jordan |
| Madison Mad Dogs | Madison, Wisconsin | Dane County Coliseum | Dick Adams |
| Minnesota Monsters | Falcon Heights, Minnesota | Minnesota State Fairgrounds | Ron Simmons |
| Texas Bullets | Belton, Texas | Bell County Expo Center | Wayne Stigler |
| Utah Catzz | Orem, Utah | David O. McKay Events Center | Gordon Hudson |

=== Standings ===
| Teams | Wins | Losses | PF | PA | PPG | PPA |
|---|---|---|---|---|---|---|
| Louisiana Bayou Beast | 13 | 1 | 565 | 400 | 47.1 | 33.3 |
| Madison Mad Dogs | 10 | 4 | 450 | 371 | 40.9 | 33.7 |
| Green Bay Bombers | 10 | 4 | 585 | 458 | 45.0 | 35.2 |
| Colorado Wildcats | 9 | 5 | 340 | 360 | 34.0 | 36.0 |
| Honolulu Hurricanes | 6 | 8 | 449 | 537 | 37.4 | 44.8 |
| Utah Catzz | 5 | 9 | 343 | 462 | 31.2 | 42.0 |
| Texas Bullets | 2 | 12 | 322 | 479 | | |
| Minnesota Monsters | 0 | 14 | 122 | 199 | | |

- Minnesota folded after starting 1–4 on the season. PF/PA are for four official games actually played; the other game, which was Minnesota's lone victory, was ruled a forfeit awarded to Honolulu and the points were not counted in standings.
- Texas folded after starting 2–8 on the season. PF/PA are for nine games played.
- Utah forfeited their last game of the season to Madison. PF/PA are for 13 games played.
- Win totals for other teams include seven forfeited games by Minnesota and three forfeited games by Texas.
- Standings do not include exhibition games played by any of the teams.

=== Playoffs ===
August 7, 1998 — # 3 Green Bay Bombers 19 at # 2 Madison Mad Dogs 46

August 9, 1998 — # 4 Colorado Wildcats* 51 at # 1 Louisiana Bayou Beast 67 (at Riverside Centroplex)

* Colorado's trip to Louisiana was paid for by the owners of the Bayou Beast

==== Championship Game ====
August 15, 1998 — #2 Madison Mad Dogs 41 at #1 Louisiana Bayou Beast 42 (at Pete Maravich Assembly Center)

Semifinals
3 | Green Bay | 19
2 | Madison | 46
4 | Colorado | 51
1 | Louisiana | 63

Championship
2 | Madison | 41
1 | Louisiana | 42

=== Award winners ===
Following the championship game, the Professional Indoor Football League held an on-the-field awards ceremony. Those honored were as follows:

- Most Valuable Player – Melvin Hill, QB, Louisiana Bayou Beast
- Offensive Player of the Year – Jay McDonagh, QB, Green Bay Bombers
- Defensive Player of the Year – Derric Coakley, DE, Green Bay Bombers
- Coach of the Year – Buford Jordan, Louisiana Bayou Beast
- Executive of the Year – James Shiver, Sr., Louisiana Bayou Beast

The Professional Indoor Football League earlier announced its 1998 All-Star teams as chosen by the PIFL coaches. The Green Bay Bombers lead the list with five first team selections, including top vote getter quarterback Jay McDonagh. He was joined on the offensive first team by teammates Chris Perry and Heath Garland (both receivers), Louisiana's Michael Lewis (WR), Chris Cloud (center) and Matt Huerkamp (kicker), Colorado's Rob Satterly (offensive line) and Utah's Matt Meservy (OL). Green Bay, Colorado and Madison each placed a pair of players on the defensive first team.

==== All-Stars ====
- First Team
  - Offense
    - QB Jay McDonagh, Green Bay
    - RB Darnell Brooks, Colorado
    - WR Heath Garland, Green Bay
    - WR Michael Lewis, Louisiana
    - WR Chris Perry, Green Bay
    - OL Matt Meservey, Utah
    - OL Rob Satterly, Colorado
    - C Chris Cloud, Louisiana
    - K Matt Huerkamp, Louisiana
  - Defense
    - LB James Gillyard, Louisiana
    - LB Jeff Veronie, Colorado
    - S Nick Galbreath, Colorado
    - DB Ryan Buchanon, Madison
    - DB Derf Reese, Green Bay
    - DE Derric Coakley, Green Bay
    - DE Tawain Temple, Madison
    - NT Junior Fonoti, Utah
- Second Team
  - Offense
    - QB Mike Tillis, Honolulu
    - RB Byron Allen, Louisiana
    - WR Antonio Chandler, Colorado
    - WR Greg Hooks, Utah
    - WR Kahn Powell, Madison
    - OL Jim Hobbins, Green Bay
    - C Andy Ramos, Honolulu
    - K Bryan Mader, Green Bay
  - Defense
    - LB Joshua Jardine, Honolulu
    - LB Pat Rogers, Louisiana
    - S Jack Phillips, Louisiana
    - DB Keith Ballard, Louisiana
    - DB Falinko Vitale, Honolulu
    - NT Kale Cockett, Honolulu
    - DE Charles Johnson, Louisiana
    - DE Franklin Thomas, Louisiana
- Honorable Mention
  - Offense
    - QB Melvin Hill, Louisiana
    - RB Willie High, Green Bay
    - RB Darnell Jones, Honolulu
    - WR Lee McCormick, Texas
    - OL Brandon Bergstresser, Madison
    - OL Curtis Jones, Utah
    - C Carl Silva, Utah
    - K Doug Beach, Utah
  - Defense
    - LB Junior Tagaloa, Utah
    - LB Jose Salcido, Madison
    - S Nick McDaniel, Utah
    - DB Damon Jackson, Colorado
    - DB Jesse Tann, Colorado
    - NT David Cunningham, Madison
    - DE Jeff Warner, Madison
    - DE Norm Barnett, Colorado

== Lawsuit with the Arena Football League ==
In February 1998, the Arena Football League (AFL) sued the PIFL for allegedly infringing its trademarks, copyrights and patent. The PIFL answered and denied the AFL's allegations. Late in June 1998, the AFL filed a Motion for Preliminary Injunction before Judge Harry Leinenweber in Federal Court in the Northern District of Illinois. The Motion was set for hearing on July 21, 1998. On July 20, 1998, the PIFL and its league members filed their response, which included video tapes and other evidence refuting the AFL's allegations. On July 22, 1998, the day after receiving the PIFL's legal papers, the AFL withdrew its Motion for Preliminary Injunction in a lawsuit in Federal Court in Chicago. This ended the AFL's efforts to challenge the practices of any competing professional "indoor" football league and clarified that its patent essentially applied to its end zone rebound nets, not any and all efforts to play American football indoors.

On November 12, 1998, the PIFL and the AFL reached a settlement agreement in the lawsuit brought by the AFL against the PIFL for patent infringement. As part of the settlement, all present and future PIFL teams have agreed to honor the patents, trademarks, copyrights and net structure of the AFL, and in return the AFL has withdrawn its motion to seek a restraining order to prevent the PIFL from playing its games. Additionally, the PIFL has agreed to use the following disclaimer, "PIFL and its teams are not affiliated, sponsored or associated with the AFL or any of its member teams", on all official publications. PIFL Commissioner Mike Storen stated, "The Professional Indoor Football League is happy to acknowledge the uniqueness of the AFL's patented net system and method of play on the basis that this settlement will allow the Professional Indoor Football League to expand in an orderly fashion."

== PIFL European Division ==
The PIFL proposed European Division was set to kick off in November 1998 with teams in England and Ireland. A six-team tournament was planned for August 22, 1998 in Manchester, England. Terry Smith was the PIFL European League Director and was the head coach of the Great Britain Spartans. The Spartans were a very successful European minor American football club, trying to move up to the pro level. The Spartans played two exhibition games in the US on April 27, 1998, at the Madison Mad Dogs and on April 29, 1998, at the Green Bay Bombers. They lost both games, 12–29 to Madison and 34–55 to Green Bay. The proposed European Division never started play.
