= Neal S. Blaisdell Center =

Arena in Honolulu, Hawaii, USA

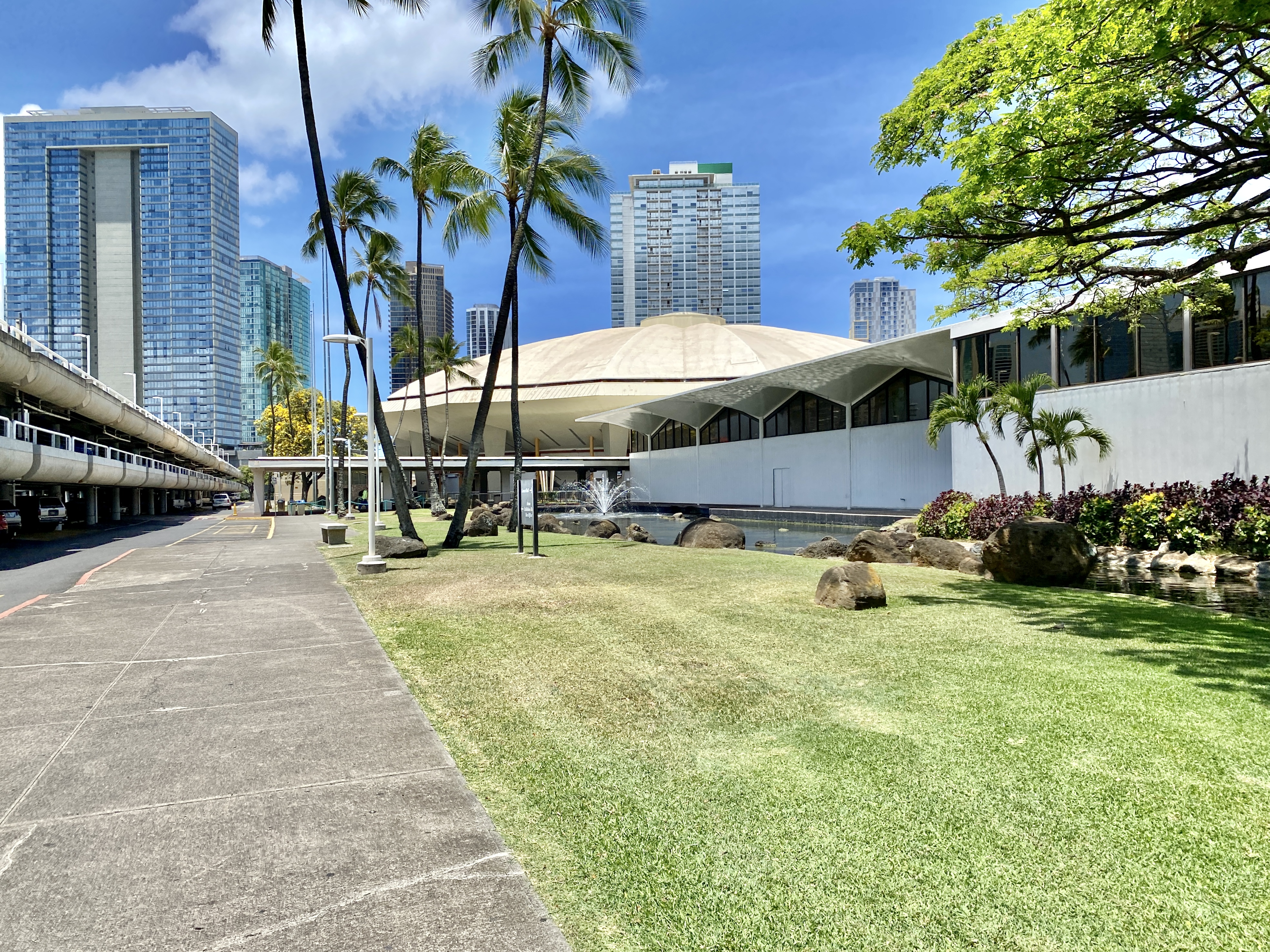
- Interactive map of Neal S. Blaisdell Center
- Former names: Honolulu International Center (1964–76)
- Address: 777 Ward Ave; Honolulu, Hawaii 96814-2166
- Location: Downtown Honolulu, Oahu
- Coordinates: 21.29991°N 157.85062°W
- Owner: City and County of Honolulu

Construction
- Opened: September 12, 1964
- Renovated: 1994
- Cost: $14 million

Website
- blaisdellcenter.com

The Neal S. Blaisdell Center is a community center near downtown Honolulu, Hawaii. The complex includes a multi-purpose arena, a concert hall, an exhibition hall, a galleria, meeting rooms, the Waikiki Shell, and other facilities.

Constructed in 1964 on the historic Ward Estate and originally called the Honolulu International Center, the center was renamed after Mayor of Honolulu Neal S. Blaisdell, who oversaw its construction. It was remodeled and expanded in 1994. The complex is overseen by the city's Department of Enterprise Services, which also oversees the Waikiki Shell. As of 2019, the city is seeking to redevelop the site with extensive stakeholder and public involvement to assess the community's goals.

== Facilities and events ==
=== Arena ===
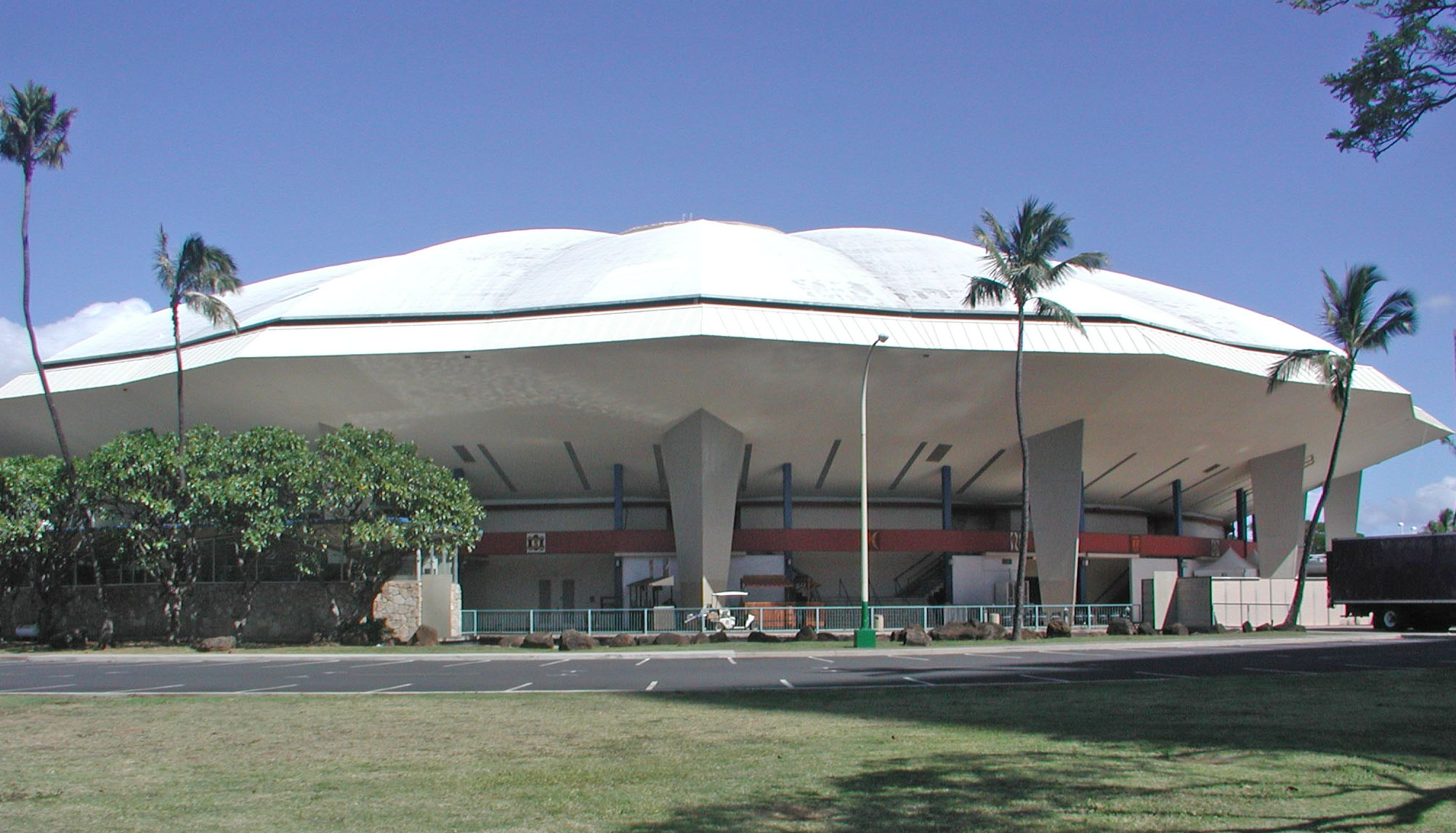
Blaisdell Arena

The Neal S. Blaisdell Arena is a circular performance facility used for concerts and major sporting events. The arena can accommodate 7,700 seats for sports events, and up to 8,800 seats for stage events with seats set up on the arena floor.

On December 3, 1966, The Monkees gave their first live concert here. They played a 40-minute set. Loggins and Messina performed their final two concerts here on September 24 and 25, 1976.

Elvis Presley's Aloha from Hawaii via Satellite concert was held here on January 14, 1973. In recognition of the concert, a bronze statue of Presley was installed in 2007 outside the front of the arena. The statue was sponsored by the cable channel TV Land.

Other events at the arena include WWE live events, Disney on Ice, American Idol Live!, Sesame Street Live, college basketball and volleyball, and international gymnastics, as well as a fundraising concert for victims of Hurricane Iniki, with Crosby, Stills & Nash, Jackson Browne & Bonnie Raitt, and a 1965 Billy Graham crusade.

Other music artists that have performed at the arena include Destiny's Child, The Beach Boys, Kiss, Led Zeppelin, Iron Maiden, The Rolling Stones, Mariah Carey, The Jackson 5, Metallica, Aerosmith, Van Halen, Bon Jovi, Elton John, Santana, Toto, Journey, Halsey, Run-DMC, Coolio, Bruno Mars, No Doubt, America, Bread, Culture Club, Avenged Sevenfold, Janet Jackson, Carrie Underwood and Bini.

During a circus performance in 1994, Tyke, an African Elephant, killed her trainer and charged out of the arena in a rage. The animal rampaged outside the arena for 30 minutes before police fired 87 rounds at the elephant, who eventually collapsed and died as a result of the shooting.

The Philippine TV show ASAP performed at the arena on June 30, 2018, through an international concert titled ASAP Live in Honolulu.

Many graduation and commencement ceremonies are held by schools in the arena and concert hall in late May and June.

=== Sports ===
The Arena also hosts the start of the exhibition season for the Los Angeles Lakers of the National Basketball Association and the men's and women's basketball and volleyball games for Hawaii Pacific University, the state's largest private university. It served as the home court for University of Hawaiʻi at Mānoa basketball until UH built the Stan Sheriff Center on campus in 1994. The arena was the home venue for several short-lived attempts to establish Hawaii professional sports teams, including the Hawaii Volcanos of the Continental Basketball Association, the Hawaii Hurricanes of the American Basketball Association, the Hawaii Leis of World Team Tennis and three indoor football teams: the Honolulu Hurricanes, the Hawaii Hammerheads, and the AF2's Hawaiian Islanders, and the Arena Football League All-Star game of 2013. The Leis and Islanders each persisted for three full seasons, the longest of all the pro teams based at the arena. In 1982, the arena served as home court for Chaminade University in a Christmas Eve upset of a Ralph Sampson-led number one ranked University of Virginia, 77–72.

In November 2006, the Professional Bull Riders hosted the Cheeseburger Island Style PBR Hawaii All-Star Challenge, a special event that took place between the 2006 PBR World Finals and the start of the 2007 PBR season.

In 2020, the arena hosted a Davis Cup qualifying round matchup between the United States and Uzbekistan.

=== Concert Hall ===
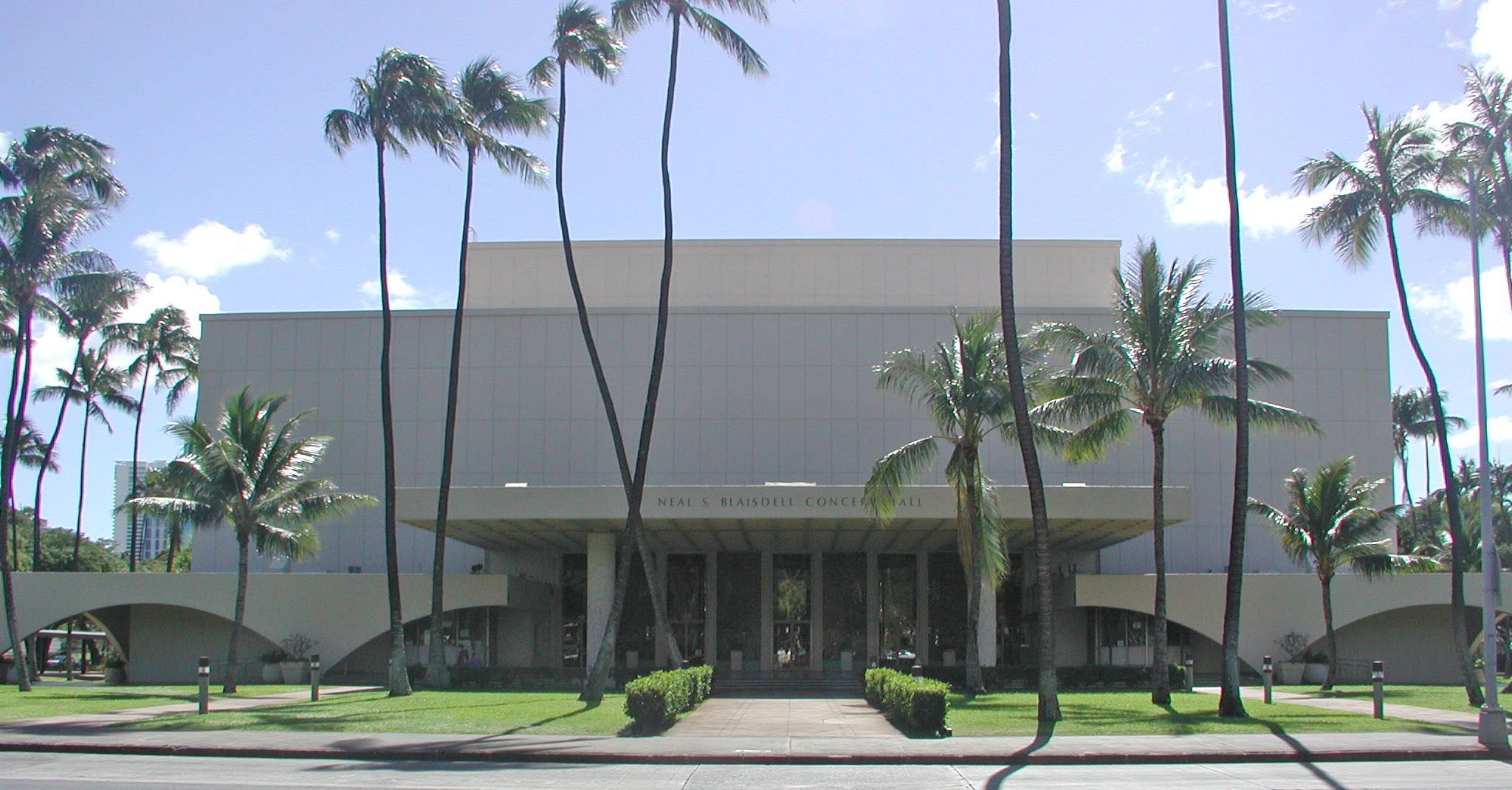
Blaisdell Concert Hall

With a capacity of 2,158 seats, the Neal S. Blaisdell Concert Hall was the home of the Honolulu Symphony and the Hawaiʻi Opera Theatre. Broadway productions such as The Phantom of the Opera, Les Misérables, Rent, Miss Saigon, Chicago, Cats, and other national touring shows have performed at the concert hall. In the fall and early winter of 2007 the concert hall was host to the Broadway musical The Lion King, a booking which displaced the Honolulu Symphony from its usual home and led to a major cash flow crisis for the orchestra. Elvis Presley also performed at the then Honolulu International Centre.

=== Exhibition Hall ===
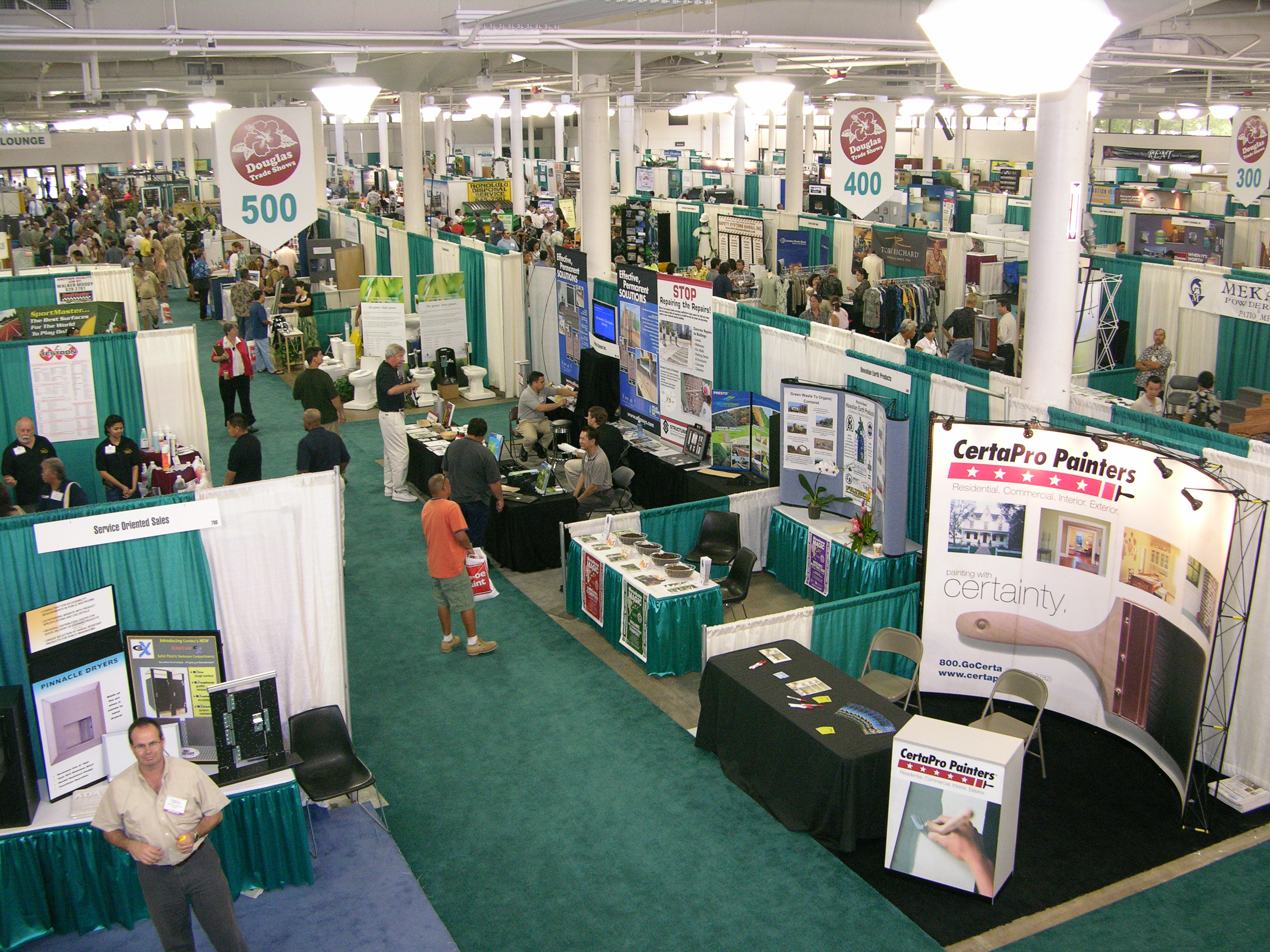
Inside the Blaisdell Exhibition Hall

Located between the Concert Hall and the Arena, the Exhibition Hall provides 65,000 square feet (6,000 m^{2}) of exhibition space on the main floor that is expandable to 85,000 square feet (7,900 m^{2}) when combined with adjoining spaces. Five meeting rooms are also available in the hall. The Exhibition Hall accommodates numerous local trade and consumer shows and fundraising events throughout the year, and is one of the main exhibition venues in Honolulu in addition to the Hawaii Convention Center.

The Exhibition Hall hosts events throughout the year such as craft fairs, gun shows, family expos, job fairs, food & product shows, as well as private trade shows.

=== Miscellaneous ===
Many religious ceremonies have been performed in the Neal S. Blaisdell Center. The largest of which were the enthronement of Joseph Anthony Ferrario as the third Bishop of Honolulu and the ordination and installation of Clarence Richard Silva as the fifth Bishop of Honolulu, overseeing the Roman Catholic Diocese of Honolulu. Kamehameha Schools has held their annual song contest at the Blaisdell since 1964.

On December 23, 1982, what is considered by many as the greatest upset in sports history happened at the Blaisdell Arena as the then number 1-ranked University of Virginia Cavaliers, led by future Hall of Famer Ralph Sampson, were beaten 77–72 by Chaminade University, a small NAIA school (today NCAA Division II) with a student body of 800.

== See also ==
- List of concert halls
- Tyke (elephant)
