= Texas Terminators =

Indoor football team based in Austin, Texas, U.S.

Texas Terminators
| Founded | 1999 |
| Arena | Travis County Expo Center |
| Based in | Austin, Texas |
| Colors | Purple, teal, black, grey & white |
| League | Indoor Professional Football League |
| Head coach | Duane Duncum |

The Texas Terminators was an indoor football team that played in the Indoor Professional Football League (IPFL) in 1999. The Terminators franchise was owned by Jeff Parnell. The team office was based in Austin, and played their games in the Travis County Expo Center, known as "The Barn" for Terminators games. The team colors were: Purple, Teal, Black, Grey & White.

On September 1, 1998, Texas announced Duane Duncum as its head coach for the Terminators' inaugural season. Duncum's resume included four years of professional football experience: Hamilton Tiger-Cats (CFL), 1991; Orlando Thunder (WLAF), 1992; San Antonio Force (AFL), 1993; and Dallas Texans (AFL), 1994. Prior to his professional career, Duncum was a standout linebacker at the University of Texas. The team held tryouts at Austin High School on October 17, 1998.

The Terminators won a perfect 8-0 at home, 12-4 overall for the 1999 season. Texas won the regular season IPFL title and a bye through the playoffs, straight to the 1999 IPFL Championship Game as the number one seeded team.

== 1999 Texas Terminators IPFL Schedule ==
- Week 1 - bye
- Week 2 - Texas Terminators 47, at Louisiana Bayou Beast 28
- Week 3 - Texas Terminators 36, at Hawaii Hammerheads 21
- Week 4 - Texas Terminators 49, at Hawaii Hammerheads 34
- Week 5 - Rocky Mountain Thunder 36, at Texas Terminators 29
- Week 6 - Texas Terminators 35, at Mississippi Fire Dogs 33
- Week 7 - Texas Terminators 62, at Louisiana Bayou Beast 46
- Week 8 - Texas Terminators 34, at Mississippi Fire Dogs 5
- Week 9 - Texas Terminators 35, at Louisiana Bayou Beast 13
- Week 10 - Texas Terminators 58, at Rocky Mountain Thunder 15
- Week 11 - Texas Terminators 42, at Idaho Stallions 19
- Week 12 - Mississippi Fire Dogs 32, at Texas Terminators 27
- Week 13 - Hawaii Hammerheads 55, at Texas Terminators 44
- Week 14 - Texas Terminators 44, at Mississippi Fire Dogs 41
- Week 15 - Texas Terminators 23, at Louisiana Bayou Beast 16
- Week 16 - bye
- Week 17 - Idaho Stallions 35, at Texas Terminators 34
- Week 18 - Texas Terminators 55, at Idaho Stallions 37

== 1999 IPFL Championship Game ==
On August 20, 1999, the #2 Hawaii Hammerheads (10-6) defeated the #1 ranked Texas Terminators 28-13 at the Travis County Expo Center in front of 4,527 fans. Behind an opportunistic defensive effort, the Hammerheads held the Texas offense, the league's highest-scoring unit well below its regular-season average of 40.8 points per game. In doing so, Texas finished with just eight first downs and 144 yards of total offense. Aside from recording four turnovers (two fumble recoveries and two interceptions), Hawaii also held the regular-season champion Terminators scoreless for two quarters.

== Notable players ==
The Terminators were stocked with a great deal of local talent and former stars of the University of Texas, including: James Brown (who was named IPFL Offensive Player of the year), Butch Hadnot, and Lance Gunn (who had signed but opted to work for Frito Lay instead). The defense was led by Aaron Hamilton, who had 11.5 sacks on the season.

Duane Duncum was named coach of the year and four players were named all-stars: Mike Lindley (C), Demo Odems (WR) (who later was named MVP of ArenaBowl XV), Aaron Hamilton (DL) and Tawan Temple (DL).

== Terminators Fold ==
The official Texas Terminators website announced right after the 1999 IPFL Championship Game loss that the team would skip the 2000 IPFL season, but the team did not return for the 2001 season either and did not make the move to the National Indoor Football League either.
