= Indoor Football League (1999–2000) =

Indoor American football league founded in 1999

- Sport: indoor football
- Founded: 1999
- Founder: Keary Ecklund
- First season: 1999
- Folded: 2000
- CEO: Kellen Winslow
- Motto: Wall to Wall War
- No. of teams: 13
- Country: United States
- Last champions: Green Bay Bombers (1999); Peoria Pirates (2000)

The Indoor Football League (IFL) began in 1999 as an offshoot of the troubled Professional Indoor Football League. Keary Ecklund, the owner of the Green Bay Bombers and Madison Mad Dogs, left the PIFL after its first, financially troubled, season to start his own league. Unlike the PIFL, the IFL was an "entity league"; teams were owned by the league and franchised out to management groups. NFL Hall-of-Famer Kellen Winslow was brought in as commissioner. The league was successful enough for a major expansion in 2000. Expansion was done regionally to cut down on travel expenses. Hence, the majority of the teams were in the Midwest. Their championship game was known as the Gold Cup.

Midway through the 2000 season, the Topeka Knights changed management and nicknames and became the Kings. After the season, the entire league was purchased by the Arena Football League's Orlando Predators. Two teams, the Lincoln Lightning and Peoria Pirates, as well as many players, became a part of their developmental ("farm") league, the AF2. The Wichita Warlords were rebranded the Wichita Stealth. Other teams resurfaced with new names in the Indoor Professional Football League (which consisted of the remnants of the PIFL that Ecklund left in 1999) and the National Indoor Football League.

== Teams ==
=== 1999 teams ===
North Division

1. y-Peoria Pirates, 11-1

2. x-Green Bay Bombers, 9-3

3. Madison Mad Dogs, 6-6

4. Duluth-Superior Lumberjacks, 1-11

South Division

1. y-Lincoln Lightning, 7-5

2. x-Dayton Skyhawks, 6-6

3. Topeka Knights, 6-6

4. Steel Valley Smash, 2-10

- y – clinched division
- x – clinched wild card

=== 2000 teams ===
==== Eastern Conference ====
Northern Division

1. z-Peoria Pirates (14-0)

2. x-Green Bay Bombers (10-4)

3. x-Madison Mad Dogs (8-6)

4. Minnesota Purple Rage (5-9)

5. Duluth-Superior Lumberjacks (2-12)

6. La Crosse River Rats (2-12)

Southern Division

1. y-Steel Valley Smash (9-5)

2. x-Erie Invaders (6-8)

3. x-Dayton Skyhawks (6-8)

4. Johnstown Jackals (3-11)

5. Flint Flames (2-12)

==== Western Conference ====
Northern Division

1. z-Bismarck Blaze (11-3)

2. x-Black Hills Machine (10-4)

3. x-Casper Cavalry (9-5)

4. Billings Thunderbolts (8-6)

5. Fargo Freeze (1-13)

Southern Division

1. y-Topeka Knights/Kings (10-4)

2. x-Lincoln Lightning (10-4)

3. x-Sioux City Attack (9-5)

4. Sioux Falls Cobras (8-6)

5. Wichita Warlords (4-10)

- z – clinched conference
- y – clinched division
- x – clinched wild card

=== Failed Franchises/Expansion ===
- Iowa Voltage - announced as member of, but never actually played, in the league.

== Playoffs ==
=== 1999 playoffs ===
Semifinals
3	Lincoln	34
2	Green Bay	44
4	Dayton	40
1	Peoria	41

1999 Gold Cup
2	Green Bay	63
1	Peoria Pirates	60

=== 2000 playoffs ===
Rapid City, South Dakota	Topeka, Kansas
6	Casper	32
3	Black Hills	21
3	Black Hills	75	Bismarck, North Dakota
2	Topeka	26
Western Conference
Lincoln, Nebraska	2	Topeka	29
Bismarck, North Dakota
1	Bismarck	38
5	Sioux City	52	Western Conference Championship
5	Sioux City	14
4	Lincoln	38	Peoria, Illinois
1	Bismarck	30
Wild Card playoffs
Divisional playoffs
Ashwaubenon, Wisconsin	W1	Bismarck	42
Wheeling, West Virginia
E1	Peoria	69
6	Dayton	23	2000 Gold Cup
3	Green Bay	10
3	Green Bay	64	Peoria, Illinois
2	Steel Valley	21
Eastern Conference
Madison, Wisconsin	2	Steel Valley	55
Peoria, Illinois
1	Peoria	75
5	Erie	22	Eastern Conference Championship
4	Madison	13
4	Madison	34
1	Peoria	25
