= Lincoln Capitols =

American indoor football team

Logo

General information
- Founded: 1998
- Folded: 2006
- Headquartered: Lincoln, Nebraska at the Pershing Center
- Colors: Red, White, Blue

Personnel
- Owner: Bruce Bailey
- Head coach: Marc Munford. Chris Simpson, Mike Dixon, Nate Jacks (Jack Jax), Ty Goode

Team history
- Lincoln Lightning (1999–2001); Lincoln Capitols (2002–2006)

Home fields
- Pershing Center (1999–2006)

League / conference affiliations
- Indoor Football League (1999–2000) af2 (2001) National Indoor Football League (2002–2006)

Championships
- Conference championships: 2; 1999 (IFL), 2002 (NIFL)

Playoff appearances (3)
- 1999 (IFL), 2000 (IFL), 2002 (NIFL)

The Lincoln Capitols were a professional indoor football team that played their home games at Pershing Auditorium in Lincoln, Nebraska, United States. They originally planned on becoming the Nebraska Knockout, but the name was scrapped. From 1999 to 2000, they were the Lincoln Lightning of the original Indoor Football League before the IFL was bought out. The Lightning then played in the Arena Football's farm league during the 2001 season, before leaving the league and joining the National Indoor Football League as the Capitols.

Lincoln had minimal success for most of the team's history, despite being successful in the regular season. They are the only team to lose in two shutouts, a rarity in the NIFL.

== History 2000-2005 ==
During their 2001-2005 run, the franchise's most prominent player was a former Nebraska Cornhusker running back named Damon Benning and the franchise's owner was Andrew Cheesman. In 2003, former Denver Broncos player Marc Munford was hired as head coach.

== 2006 Season ==
In 2006 the Capitols hired EX-NFL player Chris Simpson, who assembled a promising roster. He signed standout players Nate Jacks from Atlanta, Mike Carrawell from St. Louis, Abdul Rasheed (All American Triple Jumper from TCU), Brian Guthrie from National City (San Jose State) and James Easterling (Texas Tech). Coach Chris Simpson brought these key players in to play many roles. Brian Guthrie came in as a DB/LB/RB and later played for the IFL Wyoming Cavalry (2007–2008). Rasheed came in as a DB/WR. Easterling came in as a candidate for the starting RB/KR position. Mike was an All-American slot receiver from Quincy University and Nate was a shutdown corner back from KU.

The NIFL, hoping to kill off their APFL competition and make the Capitols better, talked with the St. Joseph Explorers of the APFL and interested them in merging with the Lincoln Capitols and becoming the St. Joseph Storm. The team was still declined and was later bought by the league and made a traveling team. The end result was prospective owners saw NIFL as a league to avoid which was a major factor in the league's problems in 2007.

== Season-by-season ==
Season records
Season	W	L	T	Finish	Playoff results
Lincoln Lightning (IFL)
1999	7	5	0	1st Southern	Lost Semifinal (Green Bay)
2000	10	4	0	2nd Southern	Lost Round 1 (Sioux City)
Lincoln Lightning (af2)
2001	6	10	0	7th NC Midwestern	--
Lincoln Capitols (NIFL)
2002	10	4	0	1st Pacific Northern	Lost Round 1 (Billings 54, Lincoln 51)
2003	9	5	0	2nd Pacific Northern	--
2004	3	11	0	4th Pacific Northern	--
2005	0	12	0	5th Pacific Western	--
Lincoln Capitols/St. Joseph Explorers
2006	0	14	0	3rd Pacific Western	--
Totals	45	68	0	(including playoffs)	
