= Dayton Skyhawks =

American Football Team

General information
- Founded: 1998
- Folded: 2000
- Headquartered: Dayton, Ohio
- Colors: Red, silver, black, white

Team history
- Dayton Skyhawks (1999–2000)

League / conference affiliations
- Indoor Football League (1999–2000): South Division (1999); Eastern Conference (2000); Northern Division (2000)

Playoff appearances (1)
- 2000

The Dayton Skyhawks were a professional indoor American football team based in Dayton, Ohio. They were a charter member of the original Indoor Football League in 1999.

They lasted both of the league's two seasons and folded when the league disbanded. Earnest Wilson was the Skyhawk's first head coach and general manager. Chris MacKeown coached the team during the 2000 season.

== Season-by-season ==
Season records
Season	W	L	T	Finish	Playoff results
1999	6	6	0	2nd Southern	Lost Semifinal (Peoria)
2000	6	8	0	3rd EC Southern	Lost Round 1 (Green Bay)
Totals	12	16	0		
