= Hawaii Hammerheads =

Former indoor American football team

Hawaii Hammerheads
Founded	1999
Arena	Neal S. Blaisdell Center
Based in	Honolulu, Hawaii
Colors	Aqua, silver and black
League	Indoor Professional Football League
Head coach	Guy Benjamin

The Hawaii Hammerheads was an indoor American football team in the Indoor Professional Football League (IPFL) during the 1999 season. The team was owned by George Hetherington and played home games at the Neal S. Blaisdell Center in Honolulu, Hawaii. The team's official colors were aqua, silver and black. The head coach for the Hammerheads was Guy Benjamin.

The Hammerheads brought Hawaii its first ever football championship with a 28–13 win against the Texas Terminators in the 1999 IPFL Championship game played at Austin, Texas. After the season, the team folded after not making any money in the first year and not being able to secure financial backing for the 2000 season.

== Hammerheads staff and team information ==
Majority owner/president: George Heatherington
Minority owner: Robert Wu
Director of communications: Chris Hart
Director of sales and marketing: Kalei Kamakahi
Director of promotions: Tamme Strickland
Head coach: Guy Benjamin

== 1999 IPFL Hawaii Hammerheads schedule ==
Saturday, April 17 - Hawaii Hammerheads 27, Mississippi Fire Dogs 24
Saturday, April 24 - Texas Terminators 36, Hawaii Hammerheads 21
Thursday, April 29 - Texas Terminators 49, Hawaii Hammerheads 34
Sunday, May 9 - Hawaii Hammerheads 53, Idaho Stallions 37
Saturday, May 15 - Idaho Stallions 27, Hawaii Hammerheads 26 (OT)
Sunday, May 23 - Hawaii Hammerheads 57, Rocky Mountain Thunder 40
Friday, May 28 -Hawaii Hammerheads 37, Rocky Mountain Thunder 18
Saturday, June 5 - Hawaii Hammerheads 38, Idaho Stallions 34
Saturday, June 12 - Idaho Stallions 63, Hawaii Hammerheads 51
Saturday, June 19 - Hawaii Hammerheads 48, Rocky Mountain Thunder 44
Saturday, June 26 - Hawaii Hammerheads 28, Rocky Mountain Thunder 17
Saturday, July 3 - Hawaii Hammerheads 55, Texas Terminators 44
Saturday, July 10 - Hawaii Hammerheads 36, Louisiana Bayou Beast 13
Saturday, July 17 - Mississippi Fire Dogs 35, Hawaii Hammerheads 20
Sunday, August 1 - Hawaii Hammerheads 24, Louisiana Bayou Beast 20
Wednesday, August 4 - Louisiana Bayou Beast 32, Hawaii Hammerheads 30

IPFL Playoff game
Saturday, August 14 - # 2 Hawaii Hammerheads 36, at # 3 Mississippi Fire Dogs 16

== 1999 IPFL Championship game ==
On August 20, 1999, the # 2 Hawaii Hammerheads (10-6) defeated the # 1 ranked Texas Terminators 28–13 at the Travis County Expo Center in front of 4,527 fans. Behind an opportunistic defensive effort, the Hammerheads held the Texas offense, the league's highest-scoring unit, well below its regular-season average of 40.8 points per game. In doing so, Texas finished with just eight first downs and 144 yards of total offense. Aside from recording four turnovers (two fumble recoveries and two interceptions), Hawaii also held the regular-season champion Terminators scoreless for two quarters. Former Los Alamitos HS and University of Hawaii QB, Tim Carey, who later played in the Arena Football League, lead the team to its championship while earning the game's MVP honors.
