= Minnesota Purple Rage =

Former professional indoor American football team

General information
- Founded: 1999
- Folded: 2000
- Headquartered: Verizon Center in Mankato, Minnesota
- Colors: Royal purple, gold, silver, white

Team history
- Minnesota Purple Rage (2000)

Home fields
- Verizon Center (2000)

League / conference affiliations
- Indoor Football League (2000): Eastern Conference (2000); Northern Division (2000)

The Minnesota Purple Rage were a professional indoor American football team based in Mankato, Minnesota. They were members of the original Indoor Football League founded in 1999 and began play in 2000. They competed in the Southern Division of the Eastern Conference and played their home games at the Verizon Center.

== History ==
The Purple Rage were founded as an expansion team in 1999 and joined the original incarnation of the Indoor Football League along with several others expansion franchises. In the only season in the IFL, the team compiled a 5-9 record finishing in fourth place in the Eastern Conference. After the IFL was bought out by af2, the Purple Rage were not among the many teams that moved to the new league and subsequently folded.

Years later in 2016, the Minnesota Havok was set to begin play in the new Indoor Football League, but quickly folded after not being able to meet the newer league's requirements.
