= Green Bay Bombers =

Logo

General information
- Founded: 1997
- Folded: 2000
- Headquartered: Brown County Veterans Memorial Arena in Green Bay, Wisconsin
- Colors: Black, green, gold, white

Personnel
- Owner: Keary Ecklund
- Head coach: Mario Russo (1998–1999); Bud Keyes (1999–2000)

Team history
- Green Bay Bombers (1998–2000)

Home fields
- Brown County Veterans Memorial Arena (1998–2000)

League / conference affiliations
- Professional Indoor Football League (1998) Indoor Football League (1999–2000): North Division (1999); Eastern Conference (2000); Northern Division (2000)

Championships
- League championships: 1: 1999

Playoff appearances (3)
- 1998, 1999, 2000

The Green Bay Bombers were an indoor football team that played in the Professional Indoor Football League (PIFL) in 1998, and in the Indoor Football League (IFL) in 1999 and 2000. The Bombers franchise was owned by Keary Ecklund. The team office was based in Neenah, Wisconsin, and played their games at the Brown County Veterans Memorial Arena. The Bombers were coached by Mario Russo for the 1998 PIFL season and part of the 1999 IFL season and by Bud Keyes for the remainder of the 1999 and 2000 IFL seasons.

== History ==
The Bombers played four preseason Professional Indoor Football League (PIFL) games in 1998. Losing only once:

- February 18 – Madison Mad Dogs 22 at Green Bay Bombers 64
- February 23 – Green Bay Bombers 45 at Madison Mad Dogs 39
- March 7 – Green Bay Bombers 32 at Minnesota Monsters 35
- March 25 – Colorado Wildcats 39 at Green Bay Bombers 53

The Green Bay Bombers tied with their sister team, Madison Mad Dogs, for the second best record in the PIFL with a 10–4 record. In the playoffs, the Bombers had to travel to Madison in the first round. They lost 19–46.

Keary Ecklund took his Bombers and Mad Dogs teams and defected from the PIFL to form the Indoor Football League (IFL). In 1999, the team finished with the second best record in the league at 9–3. The start of the season was not pretty, as the team lost two of their first three games, both loses to Peoria. The week before the playoffs, the Bombers beat Duluth, 52–15. Despite the great regular season record, the team was forced to travel to Lincoln in the playoffs. The Bombers brought back a 44–34 victory and a trip to Peoria for the IFL Gold Cup Championship. The Bombers won, 63–60.

The following year was very similar. After a mediocre 6–4 start, the Bombers won their final four games by large margins. After being routed 40–16 by Peoria, the Bombers took their frustrations out on LaCrosse to get the four game streak started, 62–26. The Bombers' actually got a home playoff game this time around and they took advantage of it, crushing Dayton, 64–23. Their bid for a repeat championship ended the following week, with a 21–10 loss at Steel Valley. When the IFL was sold, the Bombers disappeared.

In 2003, Green Bay got an AF2 team, the Green Bay Blizzard.

== Season-by-season ==
Season records
Season	W	L	T	Finish	Playoff results
Green Bay Bombers (PIFL)
1998	10	4	0	3rd League	Lost Semifinal (Madison)
Green Bay Bombers (IFL)
1999	9	3	0	2nd Northern	Won Semifinal (Lincoln Lightning); Won Gold Cup I (Peoria)
2000	10	4	0	2nd EC Northern	Won Round 1 (Dayton); Won Quarterfinal (S.V. Smash); Lost Semifinal (Peoria)
Totals	32	13	0	(including playoffs)	
