= 2005 United Indoor Football season =

The 2005 United Indoor Football season was the very first season of the UIF and was succeeded by 2006. The league champions were the Sioux Falls Storm, who defeated the Sioux City Bandits in United Bowl I.

In the league's first year, the teams were almost exclusively former NIFL or AF2 teams. Black Hills, Evansville, Fort Wayne, Lexington, Ohio Valley, Omaha, Sioux City, Sioux Falls, and Tupelo were all former NIFL members, while Tennessee Valley and Peoria were former AF2 teams. The only team not formerly affiliated with another league was the Dayton Warbirds, who were dropped from the schedule before the season began. None of the former NIFL teams changed their identity, but the former AF2 teams faced legal problems with the names, which belonged to the AF2, and were forced to change.

== Standings ==
Team	Overall			Conference		
Team	Wins	Losses	Percentage	Wins	Losses	Percentage
Northern Division
Sioux City Bandits	13	2	0.866	8	1	0.888
Omaha Beef	9	6	0.600	6	3	0.667
Sioux Falls Storm	8	8	0.500	5	5	0.500
Black Hills Red Dogs	1	14	0.066	1	8	0.111
Midwestern Division
Fort Wayne Freedom	14	2	0.875	6	0	1.000
Ohio Valley Greyhounds	6	9	0.400	1	5	0.166
Peoria Rough Riders	6	9	0.400	1	4	0.200
Southern Division
Lexington Horsemen	11	4	0.733	5	1	0.833
Evansville BlueCats	7	8	0.466	5	3	0.625
Tennessee Valley Raptors	6	9	0.400	3	5	0.375
Tupelo FireAnts	3	13	0.188	2	7	0.222

- Green indicates clinched playoff berth
- Purple indicates division champion
- Grey indicates best league record

== Playoffs ==
Quarterfinals
5	Sioux Falls	51
4	Omaha	41
6	Evansville	50
3	Lexington	55
8	Tennessee Valley	57
1	Fort Wayne	22
7	Ohio Valley	17
2	Sioux City	52

Semifinals
5	Sioux Falls	62
3	Lexington	58
8	Tennessee Valley	37
2	Sioux City	42

United Bowl I
5	Sioux Falls	40
2	Sioux City	38

== All-Star teams ==
1st Team			2nd Team		
Position	Name	Team	Position	Name	Team
QB	Dusty Bonner	LEX	QB	Jarrod DeGeorgia	SC
RB	Fred Jackson	SC	RB	Rocky Harvey	FW
WR	Willie Austin	OV	WR	Johnathan Schoonover	PEO
WR	Jeremy Dutcher	FW	WR	Sam D'Alie	BE
WR	Chad Spencer	LEX			
OL	Clint Harrison	SC	OL	Erv Strohbeen	SC
OL	Dan Potmesil	OMA			
OL	Dorna Yilla	EVN			
DL	Eddie Byrns	OV	DL	Fernandez Shaw	TV
DL	Rachman Crable	FW			
DL	Leif Murphy	OMA			
LB	Mark Blackburn	SF	LB	Jason Vanloo	PEO
S	Shannon Poppinga	SF	S	Travis Kopf	OMA
S	Anthony Kelly	LEX			
CB	William Mulder	LEX	CB	Shederick Harris	BH
CB	Andre Fields	SF	CB	Quinlan Porter	BH
K	Ted Retzlaff	OMH	K	Adam Hicks	SF
KR	James Jones	SF	KR	William Mulder	LEX
UT	Jon Paulson	SC			
