= Brian Villanueva =

American football player (born 1979)

Profile
- Position: Quarterback

Personal information
- Born: June 2, 1979 (age 47)
- Listed height: 6 ft 4 in (1.93 m)
- Listed weight: 250 lb (113 kg)

Career information
- High school: Eldorado (Las Vegas, Nevada)
- College: West Hills College Coalinga (1997–1998); Fort Valley State (1999–2000)
- NFL draft: 2001: undrafted

Career history
- Louisiana Rangers (2002); Tri-City Diesel (2003); Evansville BlueCats (2004); Lubbock Lone Stars (2004); San Angelo Stampede (2005); Evansville BlueCats (2006)*; Arkansas Twisters (2006–2008); Corpus Christi Sharks (2008); Green Bay Blizzard (2008); Iowa Barnstormers (2008–2011); Rapid City Marshals (2024)
- * Offseason or practice squad member only

Awards and highlights
- 2× All-SIAC (1999–2000)
- Stats at ArenaFan.com

Brian Villanueva (born June 2, 1979) is an American former professional football quarterback who played in the Arena Football League (AFL) and af2. He played college football at West Hills College Coalinga and Fort Valley State University. At Fort Valley State, he was a two-time All-SIAC selection and was also the team's punter during the 2000 season. Villanueva played in the National Indoor Football League (NIFL) for the Louisiana Rangers, Tri-City Diesel, Evansville BlueCats, and San Angelo Stampede, in the Intense Football League for the Lubbock Lone Stars, in the af2 for the Arkansas Twisters, Corpus Christi Sharks, Green Bay Blizzard, and Iowa Barnstormers, and in the AFL for the Barnstormers. He came out of retirement in 2024 to sign with the Rapid City Marshals of the new Arena Football League.

== Early life and college ==
Villanueva grew up in Las Vegas, Nevada. He played high school football at Eldorado High School in Las Vegas. He earned All-Southern Nevada honors his senior year in 1996.

Villanueva played his first two years of college football at West Hills College Coalinga from 1997 to 1998. He helped West Hills win the Graffiti Bowl in 1998. He then played two years for the Wildcats football team of Fort Valley State University from 1999 to 2000. Villanueva began the 1999 season as the backup to 26-year-old fellow junior college transfer Ryan Weiss but took over as starter after Weiss suffered a hamstring pull. Villanueva threw for 1,642 yards and 14 touchdowns in 1999, garnering All-Southern Intercollegiate Athletic Conference (SIAC) recognition. He completed 165 of 295 passes (55.9%) for 2,055 yards, 16 touchdowns, and 12 interceptions in 2000, earning All-SIAC honors for the second consecutive season. Villanueva was also Fort Valley State's punter during the 2000 season and midway through the season was leading the conference with a 38.7 yard average.

== Professional career ==
Villanueva signed with the Louisiana Rangers of the NIFL in March 2002, before the start of the 2002 NIFL season. Despite only being in camp for a week, he was named the team's starting quarterback. He suffered a season-ending wrist injury in his first game with the Rangers.

Villanueva was signed by the Tri-City Diesel of the NIFL in 2003. He replaced starter Roger Linn in the second half of the team's season opener, completing six of seven passes for 73 yards and one touchdown. He spent most of the game handing the ball off to running back Sherman Jones, who scored four touchdowns as the Diesel won by a score of 54–33. Villanueva was then named the starter for the team's home opener on March 29, 2003, against the LaCrosse Night Train. However, Villanueva suffered a season-ending injury for the second year in a row, this time tearing his knee ligaments on the first play from scrimmage.

Villanueva signed with the Evansville BlueCats of the NIFL in 2004 and was the backup to Joe Davis. Villanueva finished the 2004 season as a backup with the Lubbock Lone Stars of the Intense Football League.

Villanueva played for the NIFL's San Angelo Stampede in 2005. He also played for the semi-pro McHenry County Gladiators later in 2005. Villanueva was signed by the Evansville BlueCats of United Indoor Football on January 13, 2006.

Villanueva later signed with the Arkansas Twisters of the af2 for the 2006 season. He was the backup to Walter Church in 2006. After Church retired, Villanueva became the team's starter in 2007, passing for 2,632 yards and 56 touchdowns while posting a passer rating of over 100 and leading the Twisters to a 12–4 record. He missed part of the 2007 season due to injury after breaking three bones in his left foot. Prior to the 2008 season, the Twisters hired former Spokane Shock head coach Chris Siegfried to be the team's new head coach. Siegfried signed his quarterback from Spokane, Kyle Rowley, to join him in Arkansas. As a result, Siegfried gave Villanueva the option to be cut before training camp so he could have a chance to be a starter for a different af2 team. However, Villanueva declined his release and decided to compete with Rowley for the starting job. Villanueva was waived by the Twisters in early April 2008.

Seven af2 teams tried to claim Villanueva off waivers in April 2008. He was awarded to the Corpus Christi Sharks. He started four games for the Sharks, passing for 833 yards, 15 touchdowns, and eight interceptions while posting a 1–3 record. He quit the team on May 6, 2008.

Villanueva's rights were traded to the Green Bay Blizzard in late May 2008 for Quorey Payne and Kirbie Bodiford. Villanueva made his first start for the Blizzard on July 18, completing seven of 15 passes for 75 yards, one touchdown, and two interceptions before being benched in the second half for Collin Drafts. Villanueva was the fifth starting quarterback the Blizzard had used up to that point in 2008.

Villanueva then finished the 2008 af2 season with the Iowa Barnstormers, joining the team before the regular season finale against the Tulsa Talons. Against the Talons, Villanueva took over for Joe Brannen to begin the second half and completed 11 of 22 passes for 102 yards before leaving the game due to an ankle injury with 4:57 left to play. He split time with Brannen in the 2009 season opener for the Barnstormers. Villanueva made his first start for the Barnstormers during Week 2 of the 2009 season, completing 24 of 39 passes for 244 yards and seven touchdowns while also rushing for two touchdowns in a 73–68 victory over Tulsa. He was named the af2 Offensive Player of the Week for his performance in Week 2. Villanueva remained the starter for the rest of the season, and averaged 202.6 passing yards per game as Iowa finished the regular season with a 12–4 record. The Barnstormers won their first playoff game against the Manchester Wolves on July 31 by a score of 70–53. In the team's second playoff game on August 8 against the Blizzard, Villanueva scored three passing touchdowns and three rushing touchdowns. However, his last pass was intercepted as the Barnstormers lost 51–46. The Barnstormers joined the newly relaunched AFL in 2010. Villanueva started the 2010 season opener, completing three of six passes for 35 yards and two interceptions, including a pick-six on Iowa's first play from scrimmage. He was benched in the second quarter for Ryan Vena. Overall in 2010, Villanueva totaled seven completions on 14 passing attempts (50.0%) for 75 yards and three interceptions, two receptions for 25 yards and one touchdown, three rushes for one yard, and one solo tackle. Villanueva rejoined the Barnstormers late in the 2011 season, on July 13, 2011. He completed 13 of 22 passes (59.1%) for 152 yards, three touchdowns, and one interception during the 2011 season while also rushing once for a one-yard touchdown.

After being out of professional football for 13 years, Villanueva contacted the Rapid City Marshals of the new Arena Football League in 2024 to get head coach Shon King's contact info. Villanueva had played against King when King was a coach for the af2's Quad City Steamwheelers. In April 2024, Villanueva then signed with the Marshals before the start of the 2024 AFL season. At 44 years old, he was believed to be the oldest player in the new AFL, edging out Billings Outlaws quarterback Danny Southwick. Villanueva had spent time coaching and firefighting while away from football, but those activities reportedly could not replace his craving for the team atmosphere of football. In May 2024, Villanueva and most of the team, went on strike prior to a game against the Billings Outlaws. The Marshals then folded shortly thereafter.

== Personal life ==
From 2006 to at least 2013, Villaneuva worked various jobs in the hospitality industry, including at Wynn Las Vegas, Encore Las Vegas, and Bravo! Cucina Italiana. He was also the owner of a small photos and trophies business in West Des Moines, Iowa. He attended the University of Nevada, Las Vegas for further education and majored in criminal justice. On August 12, 2009, Villanueva was arrested and charged with public intoxication, interference with official acts, and disorderly conduct after arguing with a police officer at a casino.
