= 2013 Sioux Falls Storm season =

Indoor Football League team season

- Owner: Todd Tryon
- Head coach: Kurtiss Riggs
- Home stadium: Sioux Falls Arena

Results
- Record: 10-4
- Conference place: 1st United Conference
- Playoffs: Won UC Championship (Titans) 44-20; Won United Bowl (Danger) 43-40

The 2013 Sioux Falls Storm season was the team's fourteenth season as a professional indoor football franchise and fifth in the Indoor Football League (IFL). One of just nine teams competing in the IFL for the 2013 season, the Sioux Falls Storm were members of the United Conference.

Led by head coach Kurtiss Riggs, the Storm played their home games at the Sioux Falls Arena in Sioux Falls, South Dakota. Sioux Falls entered the 2013 season following consecutive wins in the league's "United Bowl" championship game in 2011 and 2012.

After early season struggles, 36-year-old former MVP quarterback Terrance Bryant returned under center. Bryant had quarterbacked the team to their United Indoor Football titles from 2005 to 2008 and had his number 5 retired. Bryant returned as number 15. The Storm finished the regular season 10-4 and earned home field throughout the playoffs. Sioux Falls defeated Cedar Rapids 44–20 in the United Conference Championship to return to the United Bowl. The Storm won a back-and-forth United Bowl over Nebraska 43–40, capturing their third straight IFL title and seventh overall indoor football title. Bryant was named MVP of the United Bowl after throwing four touchdowns in the championship.

== Off-field moves ==
Shortly before the 2013 season began, the owner of the Cheyenne Warriors died which forced that team to suspend operations and the IFL to revise its schedule to accommodate the now 9-team league.

== Schedule ==
Key: Win Tie Loss Bye

=== Regular season ===
Week	Day	Date	Kickoff	Opponent	Results		Location
Week	Day	Date	Kickoff	Opponent	Final score	Record	Location
1	Friday	February 15	7:30pm	at Green Bay Blizzard	W 64–41	1–0	Resch Center
2	BYE						
3	Saturday	March 2	7:00pm	at Nebraska Danger	L 21–30	1–1	Eihusen Arena
4	BYE						
5	Sunday	March 17	3:05pm	Wyoming Cavalry	W 67–7	2–1	Sioux Falls Arena
6	Sunday	March 24	3:00pm	at Colorado Ice	L 33–37	2–2	Budweiser Events Center
7	BYE						
8	Sunday	April 7	3:05pm	Green Bay Blizzard	W 48–29	3–2	Sioux Falls Arena
9	Friday	April 12	7:05pm	at Tri-Cities Fever	W 56–43	4–2	Toyota Center
10	Saturday	April 20	7:05pm	Colorado Ice	W 45–43	5–2	Sioux Falls Arena
11	Saturday	April 27	6:05pm	at Chicago Slaughter	L 56–61	5–3	Sears Centre
12	Saturday	May 4	7:05pm	Nebraska Danger	W 43–41	6–3	Sioux Falls Arena
13	Saturday	May 11	7:05pm	at Cedar Rapids Titans	L 18–52	6–4	Cedar Rapids Ice Arena
14	Saturday	May 18	7:05pm	Chicago Slaughter	W 53–38	7–4	Sioux Falls Arena
15	Saturday	May 25	7:05pm	Cedar Rapids Titans	W 30–24	8–4	Sioux Falls Arena
16	BYE						
17	Saturday	June 8	7:05pm	Texas Revolution	W 59–16	9–4	Sioux Falls Arena
18	Saturday	June 15	7:05pm	at Texas Revolution	W 52–38	10–4	Allen Event Center

=== Post-season ===
Round	Day	Date	Kickoff	Opponent	Results		Location
Round	Day	Date	Kickoff	Opponent	Final score	Record	Location
United Conference Championship	Saturday	June 22	7:05pm	Cedar Rapids Titans	W 44-20	11–4	Sioux Falls Arena
United Bowl	Saturday	June 29	7:05pm	Nebraska Danger	W 43-40	12-4	Sioux Falls Arena

== Roster ==
2013 Sioux Falls Storm roster
Quarterbacks: 15 Terrance Bryant; 1 Martevious Young; Running backs: 22 Tory Harrison; 13 Andre Crenshaw; Wide receivers: 8 Clinton Solomon; 23 Mike Tatum; 9 James Terry	Offensive linemen: 71 Gerald Davis; 55 Charlie Sanders; 75 Myniya Smith; 74 Frank Toarmina; Defensive linemen: 52 Rachman Crable; 16 James Dunlap; 96 Cory Johnson; 56 Jeremiah Price	Linebackers: 44 Michael Johnson; 3 Tyler Knight; Defensive backs: 2 Stewart Franks; 24 Kyle Theret; 20 Dan O'Keefe; 19 Patrick Wells; 6 Roy Polite; Kickers: 11 Parker Douglass	Injured Reserve: currently vacant; Exempt List: currently vacant; Practice squad: currently vacant; rookies in italics Roster updated March 26, 2013; 25 Active, 1 Inactive, 0 PS → More rosters

== Standings ==
2013 United Conference
	W	L	T	PCT	PF	PA	DIV	GB	STK
y - Sioux Falls Storm	10	4	0	.714	645	500	4-2	0.0	W3
x - Cedar Rapids Titans	9	5	0	.643	744	569	6-4	1.0	w2
Chicago Slaughter	9	5	0	.643	598	602	6-5	1.0	W2
Texas Revolution	5	9	0	.357	563	747	3-4	6.0	L2
Green Bay Blizzard	4	10	0	.286	622	652	2-6	6.0	L5
