= 2003 National Indoor Football League season =

2003 NIFL season
- League: National Indoor Football League
- Sport: indoor American football

Regular season
- Season champions: Ohio Valley Greyhounds

Playoffs
- Atlantic champions: Ohio Valley Greyhounds
- Atlantic runners-up: Lake Charles Land Sharks
- Pacific champions: Utah Warriors
- Pacific runners-up: Omaha Beef

Indoor Bowl III
- Champions: Ohio Valley Greyhounds
- Runners-up: Utah Warriors

NIFL seasons
- ← 2002 2004 →

The 2003 National Indoor Football League season was the third season of the National Indoor Football League (NIFL). The league champions were the Ohio Valley Greyhounds, who wrapped up a perfect season by defeating the Utah Warriors in Indoor Bowl III and becoming the first team in league history to win back-to-back titles.

== Standings ==
Team	Overall			Conference		
Team	Wins	Losses	Percentage	Wins	Losses	Percentage
Atlantic Conference
Eastern Division
Ohio Valley Greyhounds	17	0	1.000	11	0	1.000
Lexington Horsemen	9	6	0.600	6	4	0.600
Fort Wayne Freedom	8	6	0.571	5	5	0.500
Myrtle Beach Stingrays	6	8	0.429	5	6	0.455
Tennessee Riverhawks	6	8	0.429	4	6	0.400
Evansville BlueCats	1	13	0.071	0	10	0.000
Southern Division
Lake Charles Land Sharks	13	3	0.812	8	2	0.800
Houma Bayou Bucks	10	5	0.667	7	3	0.700
Austin Rockers	7	7	0.500	6	4	0.600
Beaumont Drillers	6	8	0.429	5	5	0.500
Oklahoma Crude	2	12	0.143	2	8	0.200
Tupelo FireAnts	2	12	0.143	2	8	0.200
Pacific Conference
Northern Division
Omaha Beef	12	4	0.750	9	1	0.900
Lincoln Capitols	9	5	0.643	7	3	0.700
Sioux City Bandits	6	8	0.429	5	5	0.500
La Crosse Night Train	4	10	0.286	4	6	0.400
Show-Me Believers	4	10	0.286	3	7	0.300
Tri-City Diesel	4	10	0.286	2	8	0.200
Western Division
Utah Warriors	13	4	0.765	7	3	0.700
Sioux Falls Storm	10	5	0.667	7	3	0.700
Bismarck Roughriders	9	6	0.600	5	5	0.500
Rapid City Red Dogs	7	7	0.500	5	5	0.500
Billings Outlaws	6	8	0.429	3	7	0.300
Wyoming Cavalry	4	10	0.286	3	7	0.300

- Green indicates clinched playoff berth
- Purple indicates division champion
- Grey indicates best conference record

== Playoffs ==
Round 1

- Ohio Valley 51, Lexington 42
- Lake Charles 44, Houma 19
- Omaha 72, Bismarck 49
- Utah 68, Sioux Falls 55

Semifinals

- Ohio Valley 43, Lake Charles 41
- Utah 62, Omaha 51

Indoor Bowl III

- Ohio Valley 45, Utah 37
