= 2004 National Indoor Football League season =

Indoor American football league season

2004 NIFL season
- League: National Indoor Football League
- Sport: indoor American football

Regular season
- Season champions: Ohio Valley Greyhounds

Playoffs
- Atlantic champions: Lexington Horsemen
- Atlantic runners-up: Ohio Valley Greyhounds
- Pacific champions: Sioux Falls Storm
- Pacific runners-up: Billings Outlaws

Indoor Bowl IV
- Champions: Lexington Horsemen
- Runners-up: Sioux Falls Storm

NIFL seasons
- ← 2003 2005 →

The 2004 National Indoor Football League season was the fourth season of the National Indoor Football League (NIFL). The league champions were the Lexington Horsemen, who defeated the Sioux Falls Storm in Indoor Bowl IV.

== Standings ==
Team	Overall			Conference		
Team	Wins	Losses	Percentage	Wins	Losses	Percentage
Atlantic Conference
Eastern Division
Ohio Valley Greyhounds-xy	11	3	0.786	6	1	0.857
Atlantic City CardSharks	9	5	0.643	6	2	0.750
Carolina Stingrays	5	7	0.417	4	5	0.444
Staten Island Xtreme	3	11	0.214	2	7	0.222
Greenville Riverhawks	0	4	0.000	0	3	0.000
Southern Division
Houma Bayou Bucks	11	3	0.786	9	2	0.818
Tupelo FireAnts	8	6	0.571	5	5	0.500
Beaumont Drillers	8	6	0.571	4	5	0.444
Lake Charles Land Sharks	7	7	0.500	3	6	0.333
Waco Marshals	2	8	0.200	1	4	0.250
Northern Division
Lexington Horsemen-xy	10	4	0.714	5	1	0.833
Fort Wayne Freedom	8	6	0.571	3	3	0.500
Show-Me Believers	9	5	0.643	2	4	0.333
Evansville BlueCats	4	10	0.286	2	4	0.333
Pacific Conference
Northern Division
Sioux Falls Storm	11	3	0.786	6	1	0.857
Omaha Beef	9	5	0.643	4	2	0.667
Sioux City Bandits	8	6	0.571	3	3	0.500
Lincoln Capitols	3	11	0.214	0	5	0.000
Western Division
Billings Outlaws	11	3	0.786	6	1	0.857
Utah Warriors	7	8	0.467	2	2	0.500
Wyoming Cavalry	5	9	0.357	2	4	0.333
Black Hills Red Dogs	3	11	0.214	1	5	0.000
Southern Division
Tri-City Diesel-xy	11	4	0.733	6	0	1.000
Wichita Falls Thunder	1	8	0.111	0	3	0.000
Oklahoma Crude	1	11	0.083	0	3	0.000
Colorado Venom	0	1	0.000	0	0	0.000

- Green indicates clinched playoff berth
- Purple indicates division champion
- Grey indicates best conference record
- x = clinched playoff berth, y = clinched division title

== Playoffs ==
St. Charles, Missouri	Wheeling, West Virginia
5	Fort Wayne	45
5	Fort Wayne	35
4	Show-Me	28	Wheeling, West Virginia
2	Ohio Valley	36
Atlantic Conference
Lexington, Kentucky	3	Lexington	35
Houma, Louisiana
2	Ohio Valley	34
6	Atlantic City	25	Atlantic Conference Championship
3	Lexington	70
3	Lexington	54	Sioux Falls, South Dakota
1	Houma	63
Round 1
Kearney, Nebraska	A3	Lexington	59
Sioux Falls, South Dakota
P2	Sioux Falls	38
6	Utah	59	Indoor Bowl IV
6	Utah	41
3	Tri-City	42	Billings, Montana
2	Sioux Falls	65
Pacific Conference
Omaha, Nebraska	2	Sioux Falls	44
Billings, Montana
1	Billings	13
5	Sioux City	40	Pacific Conference Championship
4	Omaha	59
4	Omaha	46
1	Billings	68
