= Dusty Bonner =

American football player (born 1978)

Profile
- Position: Quarterback

Personal information
- Born: October 27, 1978 (age 48); Valdosta, Georgia, U.S.
- Listed height: 6 ft 2 in (1.88 m)
- Listed weight: 240 lb (109 kg)

Career information
- High school: Valdosta (GA)
- College: Valdosta State
- NFL draft: 2002: undrafted

Career history
- Atlanta Falcons (2002)*; Lexington Horsemen (2003–2004)
- * Offseason or practice squad member only

Awards and highlights
- 2× Harlon Hill Trophy (2000–2001)

Dusty Bonner (born October 27, 1978) is an American former football quarterback. He was a standout Harlon Hill Trophy winner in 2000 and 2001 while playing for Valdosta State University and was signed as an undrafted free agent in 2002 by the Atlanta Falcons of the National Football League (NFL).

== College career ==
=== Kentucky ===
At Kentucky, Bonner was the backup quarterback behind eventual #1 overall NFL draft pick Tim Couch during the 1998 season in which the Wildcats ended up in the Outback Bowl after winning seven games. Couch went to the NFL after his junior season and Bonner became the starting quarterback in 1999. In 1999, Bonner started all 12 games and led the Southeastern Conference in pass efficiency, total offense, and passing yards per game. He led Kentucky to six wins (including victories over Louisiana State University and the University of Arkansas) and a close loss in the Music City Bowl. After head coach Hal Mumme announced that freshman Jared Lorenzen would be the starting quarterback for the 2000 season, Bonner transferred to Valdosta State University. Bonner lists his most memorable collegiate moment as defeating Vanderbilt while playing for UK to become bowl eligible.

=== Valdosta State ===
Bonner enjoyed a stellar career in his two years at Valdosta State, during which he earned both the 2000 and 2001 Harlon Hill Trophies as the top Division II player in the nation. The back-to-back Harlon Hill Trophies made Bonner just one of three players in the 27-year history of the award to win the honor more than once. As a junior, he passed for 4,126 yards and 55 touchdowns while completing 71.9 percent of his passes. He led the nation in total offense, touchdown passes, passing yards and pass completions while leading VSU to a 10–2 record. He was a three-time Gulf South Conference Player of the Week and three-time Division II National Player of the Week and went on to earn first-team All-GSC and GSC Co-Offensive Player of the Year before also becoming a consensus All-American.As a senior, Bonner threw for 4,037 yards and 52 touchdowns while leading VSU to a perfect 11–0 regular season and the first No. 1 ranking in school history. He was the GSC Offensive Player of the Year for the second straight season and accounted for eight touchdowns in a game against Delta State, throwing for six and running for two more scores. He was named All-American by Daktronics, D2Football.com and Don Hansen at the conclusion of the season.

In his two seasons at Valdosta State, Bonner completed 649-of-913 pass and threw for 8,163 yards. He tossed 107 touchdowns against just 22 interceptions and led VSU to playoff appearances both years. He currently holds the Blazer score record for passing yards in a game, touchdowns thrown in a game, total offense in a game, touchdowns responsible for in a game, yards per game in a season, total offense in a season and touchdowns responsible for in a season. He is third overall in career passing yards and second in both career touchdowns and total offense.

== Professional career ==
=== Atlanta Falcons ===
He signed with the Falcons on March 19, 2002, but never saw regular season action.

=== Lexington Horsemen ===
Bonner became the quarterback of the Horsemen under first year head coach Tony Franklin, who was previously an offensive assistant at the University of Kentucky before Bonner left the team. Bonner was named Atlantic Conference Offensive Most Valuable Player in 2003, finishing the season by completing 297 of his 450 pass attempts. Threw for 2,833 yards, 63 touchdowns and 18 interceptions. Finished second in the league in pass rating (109.1), third in total offense (2,884 total yards), third in passing yards (202.4 per game) and third in touchdown passes (63). The Horsemen offense scored 53.1 points per game with Bonner as their signal-caller, which ranked third best in the league. In 2004, Bonner led the Horsemen to the national championship, He threw for 2,695 yards and 72 touchdowns during the 2004 regular season. Bonner's 72 touchdowns rank as a league best in 2004. He also compiled a quarterback rating of 108.54, which also ranked first. Completed 18-of-28 passes in the championship game vs. the Sioux Falls Storm for 193 yards and five touchdowns. After a successful career on the field Bonner joined the front office of the Horsemen working under Andy Raaker as the General Manager. In this position he would be very helpful in continuing the dominance that had been started by Raaker.

=== Awards and honors ===
- Harlon Hill Trophy (2000)
- Harlon Hill Trophy (2001)
- National Indoor Football Championship (2004)
- Division II Football Hall of Fame member (2013)

== See also ==
- List of NCAA football records
