= 2001 National Indoor Football League season =

2001 NIFL season
- League: National Indoor Football League
- Sport: indoor American football

Regular season
- Season champions: Mississippi Fire Dogs

Playoffs
- Atlantic champions: Mississippi Fire Dogs
- Atlantic runners-up: Ohio Valley Greyhounds
- Pacific champions: Wyoming Cavalry
- Pacific runners-up: Sioux Falls Storm

Indoor Bowl I
- Champions: Mississippi Fire Dogs
- Runners-up: Wyoming Cavalry

NIFL seasons
- 2002 →

The 2001 National Indoor Football League season was the first season of the National Indoor Football League (NIFL). The league champions were the Mississippi Fire Dogs, who defeated the Wyoming Cavalry in Indoor Bowl I.

== Standings ==
| Team | Overall | | | Conference | | |
| Team | Wins | Losses | Percentage | Wins | Losses | Percentage |
|---|---|---|---|---|---|---|
Eastern Division
| Ohio Valley Greyhounds | 12 | 4 | 0.750 | 8 | 2 | 0.800 |
| Johnstown J Dogs | 10 | 5 | 0.667 | 6 | 3 | 0.667 |
| River Cities LocoMotives | 1 | 13 | 0.071 | 0 | 9 | 0.000 |
Southern Division
| Mississippi Fire Dogs | 16 | 1 | 0.941 | 9 | 1 | 0.900 |
| Lake Charles Land Sharks | 11 | 4 | 0.733 | 7 | 3 | 0.700 |
| Tupelo FireAnts | 7 | 7 | 0.500 | 7 | 5 | 0.583 |
| Mobile Seagulls | 5 | 8 | 0.385 | 4 | 6 | 0.400 |
| Louisiana Rangers | 5 | 9 | 0.357 | 4 | 7 | 0.364 |
| Louisiana Bayou Beast | 1 | 13 | 0.071 | 1 | 10 | 0.091 |
Central Division
| Rapid City Red Dogs | 13 | 2 | 0.867 | 10 | 1 | 0.909 |
| Wyoming Cavalry | 10 | 7 | 0.588 | 6 | 4 | 0.600 |
| Sioux Falls Storm | 8 | 8 | 0.500 | 5 | 6 | 0.455 |
| Billings Outlaws | 7 | 7 | 0.500 | 5 | 6 | 0.455 |
| Tri-City Diesel | 6 | 8 | 0.429 | 3 | 8 | 0.273 |
| Sioux City Bandits | 4 | 10 | 0.286 | 4 | 8 | 0.333 |
Western Division
| Utah Rattlers | 8 | 7 | 0.533 | 7 | 1 | 0.875 |
| Yakima Shockwave | 6 | 8 | 0.429 | 3 | 5 | 0.375 |
| Southern Oregon Heat | 1 | 12 | 0.533 | 0 | 6 | 0.000 |

- Green indicates clinched playoff berth
- Purple indicates division champion
- Grey indicates best league record

== Playoffs ==
Conference Semifinals
4 | Sioux Falls | 40
1 | Rapid City | 25
3 | Utah | 20
2 | Wyoming | 48
3 | Lake Charles | 9
2 | Ohio Valley | 53
4 | Johnstown | 27
1 | Mississippi | 42

Conference Championships
4 | Sioux Falls | 31
2 | Wyoming | 37
2 | Ohio Valley | 35
1 | Mississippi | 40

Indoor Bowl I
W2 | Wyoming | 21
E1 | Mississippi | 55

== See also ==
- List of NIFL seasons
