= E. J. Burt =

American football player (born 1977)

No. 96
- Position: Defensive lineman

Personal information
- Born: October 22, 1977 (age 49); Akron, Ohio
- Listed height: 6 ft 2 in (1.88 m)
- Listed weight: 265 lb (120 kg)

Career information
- College: West Liberty State
- NFL draft: 2000: undrafted

Career history
- Ohio Valley Greyhounds (2001–2002); Cape Fear Wildcats (2002–2003); Orlando Predators (2003–2005); Philadelphia Soul (2006); Chicago Rush (2007); Utah Blaze (2008); Orlando Predators (2010)

Awards and highlights
- 2× Division II All-American (1999, 2000); 2× WVAC Player of the Year (1999, 2000); Second Team All-Arena (2005); AFL All-Rookie Team (2003); af2 Lineman of the Year (2002); All-af2 team (2002)

Career AFL statistics
- Tackles: 100
- Sacks: 33.5
- Forced Fumble: 20
- Stats at ArenaFan.com

Emmanuel Jamaal 'E.J.' Burt (born October 22, 1977) is an American former football defensive lineman.

== Early life ==
Emmanuel Jamaal Burt was born in Akron, Ohio.

== College career ==
Burt enrolled in the University of Akron, and played football there during the 1996 and 1997 seasons. In 1998, he transferred to West Liberty State, and played in their team as well. He was named Conference Player of the Year in both 1999 and 2000, as well Division II All-American for both seasons. He still holds several records for the team, including record sacks in a year (48), record sacks in a season (17) and number of career tackles for a loss (83.5). He graduated from West Liberty in 2000, with a bachelor's degree in Graphic Design.

== Professional football career ==
=== National Indoor Football League ===
Burt played for the Ohio Valley Greyhounds team, in the National Indoor Football League, for the 2001 season.

=== Arena Football 2 League ===
In 2002, Burt played for the Cape Fear Wildcats, a North Carolina team in the Arena Football 2 League. At the end of the season, he was named All-Arena Football 2 League Player, and Arena Football 2 League Lineman of the Year.

=== Arena Football League ===
==== Orlando Predators ====
Burt was signed for the 2003 season of the Orlando Predators. He played 16 games of the season, alternating between the Offensive and Defensive Lineman positions. His notable stats for the season were 31 tackles, 9.5 sacks, and causing 8 forced fumbles. At the end of the season, head coach Fran Papasedero said about Burt:

With his tremendous quickness, I felt defense would not be a problem. Offensively, he had pretty good feet, he just didn’t know how to use them. I felt if we brought him along slowly, he would have a chance to contribute. As it turned out, we looked like geniuses for signing him, but honestly, we had our doubts just like everyone else.

Burt was one of three Predators players who were voted into the AFL's All-Rookie Team at the end of the season.

At the end of the 2003 season, the Predators offered Burt an additional two-year contract to remain with them, which he signed. In the news release regarding this, Burt was called "one of the great “rags to riches” stories in the AFL." In the 2004 season, he again played in 16 games for the Predators, again in both the Offensive and Defensive Lineman positions. His notable stats while there were a total of 19.5 tackles and 6.5 sacks.

In 2005, he again played 16 games for the team, and was recorded as having 30.5 tackles, 8.5 sacks, five forced fumbles and four pass break ups. At the end of the season, he was named Second Team All-Arena.

==== Philadelphia Soul ====
At the end of the 2005 season, Burt became a free agent. He was signed with the Philadelphia Soul, and played for them for the 2006 season. He played in 16 games with the Soul, and was credited with 8 tackles and 4.5 sacks.

==== Chicago Rush ====
Burt was signed by the Chicago Rush for the 2007 season. During the season, he had a total of 21.5 total tackles, 6 sacks, five pass break ups and four forced fumbles.

==== Utah Blaze ====
Burt was signed by the Utah Blaze for the 2008 Season. As of January 2008, he was ranked 12th on the AFL’s all-time list for sacks in a career. His notable stats for the 2008 season were 5 tackles, 2 sacks and one forced fumble.
