= 2007 United Indoor Football season =

The 2007 United Indoor Football season was preceded by 2006 and was succeeded by 2008. It was the third season of the UIF.

Teams played either a 14 or 15 game schedule from March 23 until July 14, 2007.

The league champions, for the third year in a row, were the Sioux Falls Storm, who defeated the Lexington Horsemen in United Bowl III. In doing so, they became the very first football team to have back-to-back perfect seasons.

== Standings ==
| Team | Overall | | | Division | | |
| Team | Wins | Losses | Percentage | Wins | Losses | Percentage |
|---|---|---|---|---|---|---|
Eastern Division
| Rock River Raptors | 10 | 5 | 0.667 | 10 | 3 | 0.769 |
| RiverCity Rage | 9 | 6 | 0.600 | 7 | 3 | 0.700 |
| Lexington Horsemen | 8 | 7 | 0.533 | 8 | 5 | 0.615 |
| Bloomington Extreme | 8 | 7 | 0.533 | 5 | 6 | 0.455 |
| Evansville BlueCats | 5 | 10 | 0.333 | 4 | 8 | 0.333 |
| Ohio Valley Greyhounds | 2 | 13 | 0.133 | 2 | 11 | 0.154 |
Western Division
| Sioux Falls Storm | 15 | 0 | 1.000 | 11 | 0 | 1.000 |
| Billings Outlaws | 8 | 6 | 0.571 | 6 | 5 | 0.545 |
| Omaha Beef | 8 | 7 | 0.533 | 5 | 6 | 0.454 |
| Colorado Ice | 6 | 9 | 0.400 | 5 | 7 | 0.417 |
| Sioux City Bandits | 3 | 12 | 0.200 | 1 | 10 | 0.090 |

- Green indicates clinched playoff berth
- Purple indicates division champion
- Grey indicates best league record

== Playoffs ==
Division Semifinals
4 | Bloomington | 43
1 | Rock River | 30
Eastern Division
3 | Lexington | 48
2 | River City | 33
3 | Omaha | 27
2 | Billings | 62
Western Division
4 | Colorado | 16
1 | Sioux Falls | 44

Division Championships
4 | Bloomington | 49
3 | Lexington | 67
2 | Billings | 23
1 | Sioux Falls | 45

United Bowl III
E3 | Lexington | 59
W1 | Sioux Falls | 62

== All-star game ==
| All-Star Game |
| W | Western All-Stars | 25 |
| E | Eastern All-Stars | 49 |

- Located at the U.S. Cellular Coliseum in Bloomington, Illinois on Saturday, August 18
