= Kurtiss Riggs =

American football player, coach, and executive (born 1972)

Profile
- Position: Quarterback

Career history

Playing
- Sioux Falls Falcons (1999); Sioux Falls Cobras / Storm (2000–2001)

Coaching
- Sioux Falls (2005–2009) Quarterbacks coach; Sioux Falls Storm (2002) Offensive coordinator; Sioux Falls Storm (2003–2023) Head coach

Awards and highlights
- 10× United Bowl champion (2005–2007, 2011–2016, 2019); National Indoor Bowl Champion (2008); IFL Hall of Fame

Head coaching record
- Regular season: 224–58 (.794)
- Postseason: 37–7 (.841)
- Career: 261–65 (.801)

Kurtiss Riggs is an American football coach and former quarterback. He was a coach with the Sioux Falls Storm from 2002 to 2023, all but the first as head coach. During his tenure as head coach the team set a professional gridiron football record with 40 consecutive wins, and he led the team to four undefeated seasons. Riggs was also an assistant coach on national championship winning teams at the Sioux Falls Cougars.

Riggs played college football for the University of Sioux Falls where he led the Cougars to win the schools first NAIA National Championship in 1996. He was selected to the All-American team and led the nation with 55 touchdown passes that season. In 1998, Riggs signed and played professionally in Europe for the La Courneuve Flash in France Championnat Élite Division 1. He also played for the Sioux Falls Storm in the Indoor Football League in 2000–2001, before taking over as head coach in 2002.

Riggs retired after the 2023 IFL National Championship game, after winning 11 league titles and seven IFL Championships.

== Head coaching record ==
League	Team	Year	Regular season				Postseason			
League	Team	Year	Won	Lost	Win %	Finish	Won	Lost	Win %	Result
NIFL	Sioux Falls Storm	2003	10	4	.714	2nd in Western Pacific	0	1	.000	Lost to Utah Warriors in Round 1
NIFL	Sioux Falls Storm	2004	11	3	.786	4th in NC East	2	1	.667	Lost to Kentucky Horsemen in Indoor Bowl
NIFL total			21	7	.750		2	2	.500	
UIF	Sioux Falls Storm	2005	8	8	.500	3rd in Northern Division	3	0	1.000	Defeated Sioux City Bandits in United Bowl
UIF	Sioux Falls Storm	2006	15	0	1.000	1st in Western Division	3	0	1.000	Defeated Kentucky Horsemen in United Bowl
UIF	Sioux Falls Storm	2007	15	0	1.000	1st in Western Division	3	0	1.000	Defeated Kentucky Horsemen in United Bowl
UIF	Sioux Falls Storm	2008	11	3	1.000	1st in Western Division	3	0	1.000	Defeated Louisiana Swashbucklers in National Indoor Bowl
UIF total			49	11	.817		12	0	1.000	4 championships
IFL	Sioux Falls Storm	2009	6	3	.667	4th in United Central	0	0		
IFL	Sioux Falls Storm	2010	11	3	.786	1st in United Central West	2	1	.667	Lost in United Bowl to Billings Outlaws
IFL	Sioux Falls Storm	2011	13	1	.929	1st in United Great Plains	3	0	1.000	Defeated Tri-Cities Fever in United Bowl
IFL	Sioux Falls Storm	2012	14	0	1.000	1st in United Conference	3	0	1.000	Defeated Tri-Cities Fever in United Bowl
IFL	Sioux Falls Storm	2013	10	4	.714	1st in United Central West	2	1	.667	Defeated Tri-Cities Fever in United Bowl
IFL	Sioux Falls Storm	2014	13	1	.929	1st in United Central West	2	0	1.000	Defeated Nebraska Danger in United Bowl
IFL	Sioux Falls Storm	2015	14	0	1.000	1st in United Central West	2	0	1.000	Defeated Nebraska Danger in United Bowl
IFL	Sioux Falls Storm	2016	15	1	1.000	1st in United Central West	2	0	1.000	Defeated Spokane Shock in United Bowl
IFL	Sioux Falls Storm	2017	15	1	1.000	1st in IFL	1	1	.500	Lost to Arizona Rattlers in United Bowl
IFL	Sioux Falls Storm	2018	11	3	.786	3rd in IFL	1	1	.500	Lost to Iowa Barnstormers in United Bowl
IFL	Sioux Falls Storm	2019	11	3	.786	3rd in IFL	3	0	1.000	Defeated Arizona Rattlers in United Bowl
2020			Season cancelled due to COVID-19 pandemic							
IFL	Sioux Falls Storm	2021	6	7	.462	8th in IFL	0	1	.000	Lost to Arizona Rattlers in 1st Round
IFL	Sioux Falls Storm	2022	8	8	.500	5th in East				
IFL	Sioux Falls Storm	2023	7	5	.583	2nd in East	2	1	.666	Lost to Bay Area Panthers in United Bowl
IFL total			154	40	.794		23	6	.793	7 championships
Career total			224	58	.794		37	7	.841	11 championships
