= 2002 National Indoor Football League season =

2002 NIFL season
- League: National Indoor Football League
- Sport: indoor American football

Regular season
- Season champions: Ohio Valley Greyhounds

Playoffs
- Atlantic champions: Ohio Valley Greyhounds
- Atlantic runners-up: Tennessee ThunderCats
- Pacific champions: Billings Outlaws
- Pacific runners-up: Bismarck Roughriders

Indoor Bowl II
- Champions: Ohio Valley Greyhounds
- Runners-up: Billings Outlaws

NIFL seasons
- ← 2001 2003 →

The 2002 National Indoor Football League season was the second season of the National Indoor Football League (NIFL). The league champions were the Ohio Valley Greyhounds, who defeated the Billings Outlaws in Indoor Bowl II.

== Standings ==
Team	Overall			Conference		
Team	Wins	Losses	Percentage	Wins	Losses	Percentage
Atlantic Conference
Eastern Division
Louisiana Rangers	8	7	0.533	3	1	0.750
Mississippi Fire Dogs	3	11	0.214	2	2	0.500
Tupelo FireAnts	4	10	0.286	1	3	0.250
Southern Division
Lake Charles Land Sharks	13	2	0.867	6	0	1.000
Austin Knights	9	5	0.643	4	3	0.571
Houma Bayou Bucks	5	9	0.357	2	5	0.286
Oklahoma Crude	1	13	0.071	1	5	0.167
Northern Division
Ohio Valley Greyhounds	15	1	0.938	7	1	0.875
Tennessee ThunderCats	11	5	0.688	4	3	0.143
Winston-Salem Energy	6	7	0.462	2	4	0.333
River City Renegades	1	13	0.071	1	6	0.143
Pacific Conference
Northern Division
Lincoln Capitols-xy	10	5	0.667	6	2	0.750
Omaha Beef	9	6	0.667	5	3	0.625
Sioux City Bandits	9	5	0.643	4	4	0.500
Tri-City Diesel	7	7	0.500	5	3	0.625
La Crosse Night Train	1	13	0.071	0	8	0.000
Western Division
Bismarck Roughriders	12	4	0.750	9	2	0.818
Billings Outlaws	12	5	0.706	6	4	0.375
Sioux Falls Storm	8	6	0.571	5	3	0.625
Rapid City Red Dogs	6	8	0.429	2	7	0.222
Wyoming Cavalry	3	11	0.214	1	7	0.125

- Green indicates clinched playoff berth
- Purple indicates division champion
- Grey indicates best conference record

== Playoffs ==
Round 1

- Tennessee 42, Lake Charles 40
- Ohio Valley 51, Louisiana 32
- Bismarck 69, Omaha 40
- Billings 54, Lincoln 51

Semifinals

- Ohio Valley 54, Tennessee 24
- Billings 59, Bismarck 56

Indoor Bowl II

- Ohio Valley 55, Billings 52
