= 2006 United Indoor Football season =

The 2006 United Indoor Football season was preceded by 2005 and succeeded by 2007. It was the second season of the UIF. The league champions were the Sioux Falls Storm, who defended their title by defeating the Lexington Horsemen in United Bowl II and acquired a perfect season.

The only changes in the league in 2006 were that the Tennessee Valley Raptors moved from Huntington, Alabama to Rockford, Illinois, where they became the Rock River Raptors, and Bloomington was added as an expansion team.

== Standings ==
Team	Overall			Conference		
Team	Wins	Losses	Percentage	Wins	Losses	Percentage
Eastern Division
Lexington Horsemen	13	2	0.866	6	0	1.000
Evansville BlueCats	7	8	0.466	7	2	0.778
Ohio Valley Greyhounds	6	9	0.400	2	6	0.250
Fort Wayne Freedom	4	11	0.266	2	5	0.285
Central Division
Rock River Raptors	11	4	0.733	5	0	1.000
Bloomington Extreme	5	10	0.333	2	3	0.400
Peoria Rough Riders	0	15	0.000	0	4	0.000
Western Division
Sioux Falls Storm	15	0	1.000	7	0	1.000
Omaha Beef	8	7	0.533	2	4	0.333
Sioux City Bandits	6	9	0.400	1	6	0.142

- Green indicates clinched playoff berth
- Purple indicates division champion
- Grey indicates best league record

== Playoffs ==
Wild Card Round
5	Evansville	37
4	Omaha	15
6	Sioux City	33
3	Rock River	37

Semifinals
5	Evansville	26
1	Sioux Falls	32
3	Rock River	34
2	Lexington	47

United Bowl II
2	Lexington	64
1	Sioux Falls	72
