= 2008 United Indoor Football season =

The 2008 United Indoor Football season was preceded by 2007. It was the fourth and final season of the UIF. For this year, there were 8 teams (4 teams in 2 conferences) playing a 15-game season schedule with all teams playing 14 regular season games from Saturday, March 8 to Saturday, June 14. The winning team was decided in United Bowl IV on Saturday, July 12. For the fourth-straight year, the Sioux Falls Storm became the UIF champion as they beat the Bloomington Extreme.

Following United Bowl IV, the champion played against the Intense Football League champion (the Louisiana Swashbucklers) on Saturday, August 2 and won the inaugural National Indoor Bowl. The National Indoor Bowl was popular enough to allow the two leagues (UIF and IFL) create a new league called the Indoor Football League for 2009.

== Standings ==
Team	Overall			Division		
Team	Wins	Losses	Percentage	Wins	Losses	Percentage
Eastern Division
Bloomington Extreme	7	7	0.500	6	1	0.857
RiverCity Rage	6	8	0.429	4	3	0.571
Sioux City Bandits	4	10	0.286	1	3	0.250
Wichita Wild	2	12	0.143	1	5	0.167
Western Division
Sioux Falls Storm	11	3	0.786	3	3	0.500
Billings Outlaws	10	4	0.714	5	3	0.625
Omaha Beef	10	4	0.714	2	2	0.500
Colorado Ice	6	8	0.429	2	4	0.333

- Green indicates clinched playoff berth
- Purple indicates division champion
- Grey indicates best league record

== Playoffs ==
Belton, TX	Corpus Christi, TX
6	Alaska	18
3	CenTex	34
3	CenTex	71	Lake Charles, LA
2	Corpus Christi	64
Intense Football League
Odessa, TX	2	Corpus Christi	35
Lake Charles, LA
1	Louisiana	66
5	Frisco	33	Intense Football League Championship
4	Odessa	57
4	Odessa	67	Sioux Falls, SD
1	Louisiana	59
Wild Card playoffs
Divisional playoffs
St. Charles, MO	IFL1	Louisiana	42
Bloomington, IL
UIF1	Sioux Falls	54
3	Sioux City	33	National Indoor Bowl
2	RiverCity	7
2	RiverCity	37	Sioux Falls, SD
1	Bloomington	33
United Indoor Football
Billings, MT	E1	Bloomington	35
Sioux Falls, SD
W1	Sioux Falls	40
3	Omaha	30	United Indoor Football Championship
2	Billings	44
2	Billings	47
1	Sioux Falls	46

== All-Star Game ==
All-Star Game
W	Western All-Stars	57
E	Eastern All-Stars	39

- Located at the Tyson Events Center in Sioux City, Iowa on Saturday, July 19

== All-Star teams ==
Eastern Conference			Western Conference		
Position	Name	Team	Position	Name	Team
QB	Dusty Burk	Bloomington	QB	Chris Dixon	BIL
QB	Chad Kapanui	Sioux City	QB	James McNear	Omaha
RB	Johnny Bentley	Sioux City	RB	Sean Treasure	Sioux Falls
RB	Keith Brooks	Bloomington	RB	R.J. Rollins	Omaha
WR	James Walton	Bloomington	WR	Robert Reed	Billings
WR	Donald Payne	Wichita	WR	Ken Horton	Omaha
OL	Barry Brueggeman	RiverCity	OL	Paul Keizer	Sioux Falls
OL	Eric Johnson	Bloomington	OL	Dan Potmesil	Omaha
OL	Erv Strohbeen	Sioux City	OL	Artavious Williams	Billings
OL	Scott Robinson	Wichita	OL	Brandon Alconcel	Colorado
DL	Quince Holman	Bloomington	DL	Mike Bazemore	Billings
DL	Justin Montgomery	Wichita/Bloomington	DL	Cory Johnsen	Sioux Falls
DL	Andy Poulosky	Sioux City	DL	Colin Bryant	Omaha
DL	Marvin Campbell	Bloomington	DL	Steven Frye	Colorado
LB	Joe Bevis	RiverCity	LB	Mark Blackburn	Sioux Falls
LB	Spetlar Tonga	Sioux City	LB	Travis Salter	Billings
DB	Milton Proctor	RiverCity	DB	Travonti Johnson	Billings
DB	Chad Husted	Sioux City	DB	Shannon Poppinga	Sioux Falls
DB	Terrill Mayberry	Bloomington	DB	Dustin Creager	Omaha
DB	Eric Washington	Wichita	DB	Dorsey Golston	Colorado
DB	James Temple	Bloomington	DB	Travis Garcia	Colorado
K	Peter Christofilakos	Bloomington	K	Ricky Lebeda	Omaha
KR	Hurtis Chinn	RiverCity	KR	Bryan Alberty	Sioux Falls
UT	Andre Raymond	Bloomington	UT	Ryan Palmer	Colorado
