= Corey Surrency =

American football player (born 1984)

No. 12
- Position: Wide receiver

Personal information
- Born: December 22, 1984 (age 41); Miami, Florida, U.S.
- Listed height: 6 ft 5 in (1.96 m)
- Listed weight: 210 lb (95 kg)

Career information
- High school: Miami (FL) Southridge
- College: Florida State
- NFL draft: 2009: undrafted

Career history
- Tampa Bay Storm (2011)*; Dallas Vigilantes (2011)*; Nebraska Danger (2012–2013); Sioux Falls Storm (2014)
- * Offseason or practice squad member only

Awards and highlights
- United Bowl champion (2014)
- Stats at ArenaFan.com

Corey Surrency (born December 22, 1984) is an American former football wide receiver. He played junior college football with El Camino College in which he had 30 receptions for over 670 yards in 2007. He committed to FSU after decommiting from Colorado.

== Early life ==
Surrency grew up in Miami; he dropped out of high school in 9th grade and had trouble with the law, including 90 days in jail for various offenses, including felonies. He decided to return to school and obtained his high school diploma.

== College career ==
Surrency arrived at FSU in early July 2008, later than other recruits due to the death of his mother and the completion of his AA. Surrency expected to put up 1,000 yards and 8 or 9 touchdowns and break the "curse" on the #1 jersey at FSU.

Surrency caused controversy thanks to a little-known NCAA rule entitled Participation After 21st Birthday. The rule states that if an individual participates in an organized sport after his 21st birthday, but before enrolling in college, that participation "shall count as one year of varsity competition in that sport." Surrency, who is 24, had played two seasons with a semi-professional team after he left junior college. If he loses his appeal, Surrency would lose a year of eligibility. Surrency was unsuccessful in his appeal.
