= Atlantic City CardSharks =

American indoor football team

Logo

General information
- Founded: 2003
- Folded: 2004
- Headquartered: Atlantic City, New Jersey at Boardwalk Hall
- Colors: Blue, Black, Silver

Personnel
- General manager: Mike Siani
- Head coach: Mike Siani
- President: Jeff Sprowls

Team history
- Atlantic City CardSharks (2004)

Home fields
- Boardwalk Hall (2004)

League / conference affiliations
- National Indoor Football League (2004): Atlantic Conference (2004); Eastern Division (2004)

Playoff appearances (1)
- 2004

The Atlantic City CardSharks were a professional indoor football team based in Atlantic City, New Jersey. They were members of the Eastern Division of the Atlantic Conference of the National Indoor Football League (NIFL) during the 2004 season. Notable players included QB Tony Racioppi, DE Eddie Byrnes, WR/KR Steve Garrison. The team played its home games at Boardwalk Hall.

Coached by former Oakland Raider Mike Siani, the CardSharks won their first ever game on April 10, 2004, with a 77-37 victory over the Greenville Riverhawks. The CardSharks finished the regular season with 9-5 record, finishing in second place in the Eastern Division, earning a playoff spot. The CardSharks lost in the first round of the 2004 NIFL Playoffs to the Lexington Horsemen (final score: 45-25). The team folded after only playing one season in 2004.

== Coaches of note ==
=== Head coaches ===
Note: Statistics are correct through the end of the 2012 CIFL season.

Name	Term	Regular season				Playoffs		Awards
Name	Term	W	L	T	Win%	W	L	Awards
Mike Siani	2004	9	5	0	.643	0	1	

== Statistics and records ==
=== Season-by-season results ===
Note: The finish, wins, losses, and ties columns list regular season results and exclude any postseason play.

League champions	Conference champions	Division champions	Wild card berth	League leader

Season	Team	League	Conference	Division	Regular season				Postseason results
Season	Team	League	Conference	Division	Finish	Wins	Losses	Ties	Postseason results
2004	2004	NIFL	Atlantic	Eastern	2nd	9	5	0	Lost Wild Card Round 25-54 (Lexington)
Totals						9	5	0	All-time regular season record (2004)
Totals						0	1	-	All-time postseason record (2004)
Totals						9	6	0	All-time regular season and postseason record (2004)
