= Sioux Falls Storm =

Indoor American football team

- Current season
Logo

General information
- Founded: 2000 (dormant as of October 30, 2024)
- Headquartered: Denny Sanford Premier Center; Sioux Falls, South Dakota
- Colors: Navy blue, red, white
- Mascot: Blitz
- SiouxFallsStorm.com

Personnel
- Owners: David & Stephanie Richter; Patrick & Amber Garry
- Head coach: Andre Fields
- President: Amber Garry

Team history
- Sioux Falls Cobras (2000); Sioux Falls Storm (2001–2024)

Home fields
- Sioux Falls Arena (2000–2014); Denny Sanford Premier Center (2015–2024)

League / conference affiliations
- Indoor Football League (2000): Western Conference (2000); Northern Division (2000); National Indoor Football League (2001–2004): Pacific Conference (2001–2004); Central Division (2001); Western Division (2002–2003); Northern Division (2004); United Indoor Football (2005–2008): Northern Division (2005); Western Division (2006–2008); Indoor Football League (2009–2024; 2026–future): United Conference (2009–2017); Central Division (2009); Central West Division (2010); Great Plains Division (2011); Eastern Conference (2022–2024)

Championships
- League championships: 12: United Bowl championships (4) 2005 (I), 2006 (II), 2007 (III), 2008 (IV); National Indoor Bowl championships (1) 2008; United Bowl/IFL National championships (7) 2011, 2012, 2013, 2014, 2015, 2016, 2019
- Conference championships: 12: NIFL Pacific: 2004; UIF Western: 2007, 2008; IFL United: 2010, 2011, 2012, 2013, 2014, 2015, 2016, 2017; IFL Eastern: 2023
- Division championships: 12: NIFL Northern: 2004; UIF Western: 2006, 2007, 2008; IFL Central West: 2010; IFL Great Plains: 2011; IFL United: 2012, 2013, 2014, 2015, 2016, 2017

Playoff appearances (20)
- NIFL: 2001, 2003, 2004; UIF: 2005, 2006, 2007, 2008; IFL: 2009, 2010, 2011, 2012, 2013, 2014, 2015, 2016, 2017, 2018, 2019, 2021, 2023

The Sioux Falls Storm are a dormant professional indoor football team based in Sioux Falls, South Dakota. The Storm joined the original Indoor Football League as an expansion team in 1999 as the Sioux Falls Cobras, and first took the field for the 2000 season. They currently participate in another iteration of the Indoor Football League; prior to that, the Storm were in United Indoor Football (UIF), where they won all four of the league's championship games. In the newer IFL, the Storm have won seven of the eleven championships in the league as of 2019.

They recently played their home games at Denny Sanford Premier Center up until 2024 due to a leasing dispute between the team and the arena. The lease was not renewed, and the Storm entered dormancy for the 2025 season. In mid-April 2014, the team announced that the 2014 season would be its last at the aging Sioux Falls Arena (also known as the Storm Shelter), originally constructed in 1961. In 2015, the Storm followed the Sioux Falls Stampede of the United States Hockey League to the newly constructed Denny Sanford Premier Center.

== History ==
=== 1999–2000: Founding ===
==== 1999: Original IFL expansion ====
The team was founded in 1999 as an expansion team in the original Indoor Football League (IFL) as the Sioux Falls Cobras.

==== 2000: First season ====
The Cobras would win their first game when they defeated the Sioux City Attack, 44–30. In their inaugural season, the Cobras finished with an 8–6 record and fourth in the Southern Division.

=== 2001–2002: Aldrich era ===
==== 2001: Name change and first playoff appearance ====
After one season in the IFL, they became members of the National Indoor Football League (NIFL) and changed their name to the Sioux Falls Storm.

=== 2003–2023: Riggs era ===
==== 2003–04: Final NIFL seasons ====
The Storm hosted the 2004 NIFL championship game against the Lexington Horsemen in the Storm Shelter in front of a sellout crowd. The Horsemen won the championship game, but the Storm defeated the Horsemen a year later in the second round of the 2005 UIF playoffs in Lexington.

==== 2005–08: UIF United Bowl winning streak ====
The Sioux Falls Storm were charter members of United Indoor Football (UIF) in 2005 and were the first UIF champions with a win over the Sioux City Bandits, 40–38 at Sioux City. Sioux Falls won its second consecutive UIF championship in 2006 at their home ground, the Arena, defeating the Lexington Horseman 72–64 on July 29, 2006. Quarterback Terrance Bryant was named United Bowl II MVP after throwing eight touchdowns in the match. Defensive end Nate Fluit recorded 16.5 sacks in 2005 and 15.5 in 2006.

Sioux Falls became one of the few teams in indoor football history to post a shutout, beating the Peoria Rough Riders 71–0 on June 3, 2006.

On Saturday, August 4, 2007, the Storm defeated the Lexington Horsemen for the second United Bowl in a row, 62 to 59. With 19 seconds left to go in the game Storm quarterback Terrance Bryant threw up a prayer, and though protested by the small crowd of Horsemen fans, it was ruled a touchdown pass. With three seconds left in the game, and with the help of a frantic fan going for the game ball, the Horsemen gained 15 yards for a chance to kick a field goal and tie the game, but the kick was missed by Horsemen kicker Collin Barber.

On March 29, 2008, the Storm lost to the Omaha Beef 34–18, ending their historic 40-game winning streak and giving them their first loss since July 15, 2005. They went on to win their fourth United Bowl later that season against the Bloomington Extreme.

==== 2009–10: Early IFL success and insurance violation ====
On April 25, 2009, after switching to the Indoor Football League, the Storm were found in violation of the IFL's rule of not complying with regulations related to workers compensation coverage. As punishment, the team's first five wins of the 2009 season were forfeited; this resulted in a 6–8 season, the first losing season in team history. The other three losses all came to the Billings Outlaws. In 2010, the Storm rebounded to reach the United Bowl before losing 43–34 to the Outlaws.

==== 2011–16: IFL United Bowl winning streak ====
After a tornado dubbed the Father's Day Tornado hit Billings' Rimrock Auto Arena on June 20, 2010, causing major damage, the Outlaws franchise folded, and their star quarterback Chris Dixon signed with the Storm. Led by Dixon, Sioux Falls scored an astounding 1022 points on the 2011 regular season, with 70 or more points in 10 games and opening with a 105–71 win over the Kent Predators in Kent, Washington. Only twice did the Storm fall short of 50 points and both were against the Omaha Beef, who handed them a 41–37 loss in the regular season finale after Sioux Falls had started 13–0. The two teams met in the next game, which was the playoff opener. The Storm won it, 52–39, then beat Green Bay 52–12 to return to the United Bowl. Although they tied their lowest scoring game of the season, Sioux Falls rolled over the Tri-Cities Fever 37–10 to earn the league championship after a two-year hiatus and also win its first IFL title. Dixon and the Storm dominated again in 2012, this time with a perfect 14–0 record and 941 points in the regular season. On April 14, the Storm beat the Allen Wranglers, then featuring former NFL standout receiver Terrell Owens, 52–45 on the road in Allen, Texas. Dixon threw his 500th career touchdown pass, when he hit James Terry with a 42-yard pass during a May 19 game against the Blizzard. Sioux Falls defeated the Lehigh Valley Steelhawks 79–21 in the playoff opener, then again beat Green Bay in the semifinal and Tri-Cities (this time winning 59–32) in the United Bowl.

Dixon then left, attempting to make it with the Orlando Predators of the Arena Football League. Sioux Falls did not suffer greatly in 2013 as Storm legend Terrance Bryant returned to play quarterback. Following a 10–4 season, the Storm again prevailed in the playoffs and defeated the Nebraska Danger by a close 43–40 score for the title. Bryant then retired again, as on January 6, 2014, it was announced that Dixon would be returning to the Storm, citing his desire to graduate from Augustana College and be close to his family. Dixon did not disappoint, leading the Storm to their eighth title in 2014. The Storm again defeated Nebraska in the United Bowl by a 63–46 score. The Sioux Falls Storm completed its era at the Sioux Falls Arena with a 112–14 home record including 82-3 from 2006 to 2014.

In 2015, the Storm's first season at the Denny Sanford Premier Center was very successful, completing another undefeated season at 16-0 overall, and was capped off with winning their ninth league championship by a score of 62–27 over the Danger.

In 2016, the Storm continued their dominance. But lost their first game since the 2014 season as they lost at the Cedar Rapids Titans, 60–57. But despite that setback, they capped off another successful season with a win over the newly minted Spokane Empire, 55–34, to capture their tenth championship overall and their sixth IFL Championship and sixth in a row.

==== 2017–19: Continued IFL United Bowl appearance streak ====
They returned to the championship game in 2017, but lost for the first time since the 2010 season to the Arizona Rattlers.

Prior to the 2018 season, the Storm announced they would join Champions Indoor Football (CIF) on August 30, 2017, in order to have smaller travel budget and reignite rivalries with the nearby Sioux City Bandits and Omaha Beef. However, after the IFL's offseason meetings, the Storm re-joined the IFL on October 4.

=== 2024–2025: Fields era ===
==== 2025: Dormancy ====
On October 30, 2024, the Storm announced that they had been evicted from Denny Sanford Premier Center after its owners had refused to offer a lease renewal. In a statement to KELO-TV, a representative for the Center noted that the arena would have to increase the team's rent to cover its own expenses and that, because the team's attendance had been on a downward trend, it would not have been fiscally feasible for either party to continue. The Storm stated they had explored other arena options but chose to suspend operations for 2025 with the hope that it would afford the team more time to negotiate an arena deal for the team's planned return in 2026.

== Players ==
=== Retired numbers ===
Sioux Falls Storm retired numbers
N°	Player	Position	Seasons	Ref.
5	Terrance Bryant	QB	2005–2010, 2013	
7	Casey Veenhof	WR/QB	2003–2007	
10	Shannon Poppinga	S	2001–2009	
14	Mark Blackburn	LB/S	2003–2010	
17	Bobby Perkins	CB	2001–2004	
21	Corey Walker	WR	2001–2006	
25	Adam Hicks	K	2003–2008	
46	Donnie Hilsenroth	LB	2001–2003	
93	Nate Fluit	DE	2003–2007	
21	Andre Fields	DB	2003-2009	
96	Cory Johnsen	NT	2006-2015	

=== Awards and honors ===
Sioux Falls Storm Awards and Honors
2002: Western division defensive mvp – Donnie Hilsenroth (LB); 2004: Pacific conference coach of the year – Kurtiss Riggs; Pacific conference general manager of the year – Colin Steen; South Dakota's Sportswriters Association "Top Independent Team"; 2005: United bowl i mvp – Adam Hicks (K); First Team All-UIF; Mark Blackburn (LB); Shannon Poppinga (S); Andre Fields (CB); James Jones (KR); Second Team All-UIF; Adam Hicks (K); Radio broadcaster of the year – Rich Roste; Best Game Day Presentation; Best mascot – Blizzard; Executive of the year – Colin Steen; 2006: UIF mvp – Terrance Bryant (QB); UIF defensive player of the year – Nate Fluit (DL); UIF most improved – Marques Smith (RB); UIF coach of the year – Kurtiss Riggs; United bowl ii mvp – Terrance Bryant (QB); First Team All-UIF; John Semchenko (OL); Nate Fluit (DL); Mark Blackburn (LB); Second Team All-UIF; Terrance Bryant (QB); Marques Smith (RB); Nate Scheuer (OL); Austin Flyger (DL); Best mascot – Blizzard; Best Game Day Operation; UIF executive of the year – Colin Steen; UIF dance team of the year – Lightning Girls; South Dakota's Sportswriters Association "Top Independent Team"; 2007: United bowl iii mvp – Casey Veenhof (WR); UIF coach of the year – Kurtiss Riggs; UIF Western Conference All-Star; Terrance Bryant (QB); Marques Smith (RB); Leon Hall Jr. (WR); Paul Keizer (OL); Nate Fluit (DL); Leif Murphy (DL); Mark Blackburn (LB); Justin Landis (S); UIF dance team of the year – Lightning Girls; UIF's Best Public Address Announcer – JJ Hinsch; UIF's Volunteers of the Year – Tom and Jean Slattery; 2008: United bowl iv mvp – Mark Blackburn (LB); Western Conference All-Star; Sean Treasure (RB); James Terry (WR); Paul Keizer (OL); Cory Johnsen (DL); Mark Blackburn (LB); Shannon Poppinga (S); Bryan Alberty (KR); 2009: First Team All-IFL; Bruce McCaleb (OL); Second Team All-IFL; Sean Treasure (RB); Cory Johnsen (DL); 2010: Second Team All-IFL; James Terry (WR); Zac Tubbs (OL); 2011: IFL Best Game Operations; IFL mvp – Chris Dixon (QB); IFL offensive player of the year – Chris Dixon (QB); First Team All-IFL; Chris Dixon (QB); James Terry (WR); Myniya Smith (OL); Charlie Sanders (C); Second Team All-IFL; James Jones (RB); Tommy Chavis (DL); Second Team Ironman (Excelled on Offense and Defense); Stewart Franks (S/WR); 2011 United Bowl MVP – Brian McIntire (LB); 2012: First Team All-IFL; Chris Dixon (QB); Carl Sims (WR); Myniya Smith (OL); Charlie Sanders (C); Second Team All-IFL; Clinton Solomon (WR); DeJuan Fulghum (LB); IFL offensive player of the year – Chris Dixon (QB); IFL mvp – Chris Dixon (QB); 2012 United Bowl MVP – Jeremiah Price (DE); 2013: First Team All-IFL; Myniya Smith (OL); Charlie Sanders (C); Rachman Crable (DL); Tyler Knight (LB); Parker Douglass (K); Second Team All-IFL; Jeremiah Price (DL); Roy Polite (CB); IFL defensive player of the year – Tyler Knight (LB); 2013 United Bowl MVP – Terrance Bryant (QB); IFL's Top 10 Players of the 2013 Season; #2 Tyler Knight (LB); #4 Sioux Falls Storm Offensive Line; Charlie Sanders (C); Myniya Smith (OL); Gerald Davis (OL); 2014: IFL Hall of Fame Inductee; Terrance Bryant (QB) (2005–10, 2013); Rich Roste (Radio Voice) (2000–present); First Team All-IFL; Myniya Smith (OL); Charlie Sanders (C); Tyler Knight (LB); Tory Harrison (KR); Second Team All-IFL; Chris Dixon (QB); Eze Obiora (DE); Kyle Theret (S); Parker Douglass (K); IFL Best Fan Base; IFL offensive player of the year – Chris Dixon (QB); IFL defensive player of the year – Tyler Knight (LB); 2014 United Bowl MVP (co-MVP's); Chris Dixon (QB); James Terry (WR); IFL's Top 10 Players of the 2014 Season; #2 Chris Dixon (QB); #3 Tyler Knight (LB); #6 First Team All-IFL Offensive Line; Charlie Sanders (C); Myniya Smith (OL)	2015: IFL Hall of Fame Inductee; Chris Dixon (QB) (2011–12, 14); First Team All-IFL; Judd Harrold (WR); Myniya Smith (OL); Charlie Sanders (C); Cory Johnsen (DL); DeQuan Starling (DB); Second Team All-IFL; Rashaud Mungro (OL); Tyler Knight (LB); Elijah Fields (LB/DB); IFL Best Fan Base; IFL Community Relations Award; IFL coach of the year – Kurtiss Riggs; 2015 United Bowl MVP; Brandon Johnson-Farrell (WR/KR); IFL's Top 10 Players of the 2015 Season; #4 Judd Harrold (WR); #8 Tory Harrison (RB); 2016: IFL Hall of Fame Inductee; Mark Blackburn (LB) (2003–10); First Team All-IFL; Myniya Smith (OL); Charlie Sanders (C); Brandon Peguese (DL); Tyler Knight (LB); Korey Williams (KR); Second Team All-IFL; Claude Davis (DL); Elijah Fields (DB); IFL Franchise of the Year; IFL Best Fan Base; IFL Community Relations Award; IFL special teams player of the year – Korey Williams (KR); 2016 United Bowl MVP; Lorenzo Brown (QB); IFL's Top 10 Players of the 2016 Season; #5 Tyler Knight (LB); #6 Korey Williams (WR); 2017: IFL Hall of Fame Inductee; James Terry (WR) (2006–15); Cory Johnsen (DL) (2006–15); IFL Community Relations Award; First Team All-IFL; Rashad Mungro (C); Rashard Smith (DB); Second Team All-IFL; Kyle Bryant (OL); Claude Davis (DL); Tyler Knight (LB); Matt Hermanson (DB); 2018: IFL Hall of Fame Inductee; Charlie Sanders (C) (2011–16); IFL Most Improved Player; Lyle McCombs (RB); IFL Team Awards; Best Game Operations; Best Cheerleader/Dance Team; First Team All-IFL; Judd Harrold (WR); Forrestal Hickman (OL); Lawrence Martin IV (C); Trey Wafford (DB); Miles Bergner (K); Second Team All-IFL; Lorenzo Brown (QB); Lyle McCombs (RB); Jabari Gorman (DB); 2019: IFL Hall of Fame Inductee; Myniya Smith (OL); IFL Team Awards; Hospitality Award; First Team All-IFL; Forrestal Hickman (OL); Second Team All-IFL; Brandon Sheperd (WR); Claude Davis (DL); 2019 United Bowl MVP; Lorenzo Brown (QB); 2021: First Team All-IFL; Nate Chavious (RB); Trey Wafford (DB/LB); Nate Chavious (KR); All-IFL Rookie Team; Marquis Hendrix (LB/DB); 2022: First Team All-IFL; Sawyer Petre (K); Second Team All-IFL; Undraez Lilly (DL); All-IFL Rookie Team; Undraez Lilly (DL); 2023: IFL Hall of Fame Inductee; Parker Douglass (K); Tyler Knight (LB); Second Team All-IFL; Lawrence Martin IV (C); James Brown (LB); Eugene Ford (DB); All-IFL Rookie Team; Eugene Ford (DB); 2024: IFL Hall of Fame Inductee; Clinton Solomon (WR); Todd Tryon (OWNER/COACH/DB); Second Team All-IFL; Elijah Reed (DB)

=== Notable Sioux Falls alumni ===
Sioux Falls alumni
Davis, Claude – DL (2015–16) Univ. of South Florida; Davis, Gerald – OL (2011–13) Valdosta State Univ.; DeBoer, Kalen – WR (2001) Univ. of Sioux Falls; Dennis, Hershel – RB (2011) Univ. of Southern California; Dixon, Chris – QB (2011–12, 14) Humboldt State; Douglass, Parker – K (2009, 11–15) South Dakota State; Harrison, Tory – RB (2013–15) Univ. of Southern Mississippi; Johnsen, Cory – DL (2006–15) Saint Cloud State University; Jones, Jason – WR (2010) Arkansas – Pine Bluff; Knight, Tyler – LB (2011, 13–16) Mississippi Valley State; Lemon, Shawn – DL (2012) Univ. of Akron; Little, Brent – WR (2009) Southern Illinois – Carbondale; Lorne, Sam – WR/QB (2011) UTEP; McCain, Eric – WR (2013) Glendale Community College	Murphy, Leif – DE (2007, 09–10) North Dakota State; Nelson, Ben – WR (2009) St. Cloud State; Price, Jeremiah – DL (2012–13) Oklahoma State Univ.; Rislov, Scott – QB (2005) San Jose State; Smith, Myniya – OL (2011–16) Southern Univ.; Snell, Isaac – OL (2009–10) North Dakota State; Solomon, Clinton – WR (2012–13) Univ. of Iowa; Sterbick, Pete – WR (2003) Augustana College; Surrency, Corey – WR (2014) Florida State Univ.; Tatum, Mike – WR/RB (2013–16) Oxnard College; Tubbs, Zac – OL (2009–10) Univ. of Arkansas; Williams, Korey – WR/RB (2012, 16) Northwestern Oklahoma State; Young, Martevious – QB/WR (2013–15) Univ. of Southern Mississippi

== Head coaches ==
Coach		Total					Regular season					Postseason					Titles		
Coach		Won	Lost	PCT	Home	Away	Won	Lost	PCT	Home	Away	Won	Lost	PCT	Home	Away	DIV	CONF	CHAMP
Mike Aldrich	2001–2002	16	14	.533	(9–5)	(7–9)	15	13	.536	(9–5)	(6–8)	1	1	.500	(0–0)	(1–1)	0	0	0
Josh Siegfried	2012	2	0	1.000	(2–0)	(0–0)	0	0	–	(0–0)	(0–0)	2	0	1.000	(2-–)	(0–0)	0	0	0
Kurtiss Riggs*	2003–2023	265	67	.798	(156–22)	(109–45)	230	60	.793	(127–20)	(103–40)	35	7	.833	(28–2)	(7–5)	12	16	11
Andre Fields	2024	3	13	.188	(2–5)	(1–8)	3	13	.188	(2–5)	(1–8)	0	0	–	(0-0)	(0–0)	0	0	0

* Records do not reflect the five forfeits due to insurance violations in 2009.
Also see: List of National Football League head coaches with 200 wins

== Season-by-season results ==
League champions	Conference champions	Division champions	Playoff berth	League leader

Season	Team	League	Conference	Division	Regular season				Postseason results
Season	Team	League	Conference	Division	Finish	Wins	Losses	Ties	Postseason results
Sioux Falls Cobras
2000		IFL	Western	Southern	4th	8	6	0	
Sioux Falls Storm
2001		NIFL		Central	3rd	7	7	0	Won Round 1, 40–25 (R.C. Red Dogs); Lost Semifinal, 31–37 (Wyoming)
2002		NIFL	Pacific	Western	3rd	8	6	0	
2003		NIFL	Pacific	Western	2nd	10	4	0	Lost Round 1, 55–68 (Utah)
2004		NIFL	Pacific	Northern	1st	11	3	0	Won Conference Semifinal, 65–41 (Utah); Won Conference Championship, 44–13 (Billings); Lost Indoor Bowl IV, 38–59 (Lexington)
2005		UIF		Northern	3rd	8	8	0	Won Round 1, 51–41 (Omaha); Won Semifinal, 62–58 (Lexington); Won United Bowl I, 40–38 (Sioux City)
2006		UIF		Western	1st	15	0	0	Won Semifinal, 32–26 (Evansville); Won United Bowl II, 72–64 (Lexington)
2007		UIF		Western	1st	15	0	0	Won Round 1, 44–16 (Colorado); Won Division Championship, 45–23 (Billings); Won United Bowl III, 62–59 (Lexington)
2008		UIF		Western	1st	11	3	0	Won Division Championship, 46–44 (Billings); Won United Bowl IV, 40–35 (Bloomington); Won National Indoor Bowl I, 54–42 (Louisiana)
2009		IFL	United	Central	4th	11 (Note: First five wins forfeited for insurance violation)	3	0	
2010	2010	IFL	United	Central West	1st	11	3	0	Won Round 1, 42–23 (Omaha); Won Conference Semifinal, 47–33 (Chicago); Won Conference Championship, 52–34 (Wichita); Lost 2010 United Bowl, 34–43 (Billings)
2011	2011	IFL	United	Great Plains	1st	13	1	0	Won Conference Semifinal, 52–39 (Omaha); Won Conference Championship, 52–12 (Green Bay); Won 2011 United Bowl, 37–10 (Tri-Cities)
2012	2012	IFL	United		1st	14	0	0	Won Conference Semifinal, 79–21 (Lehigh Valley); Won Conference Championship, 61–42 (Green Bay); Won 2012 United Bowl, 59–32 (Tri-Cities)
2013	2013	IFL	United		1st	10	4	0	Won Conference Championship, 44–20 (Cedar Rapids); Won 2013 United Bowl, 43–40 (Nebraska)
2014	2014	IFL	United		1st	13	1	0	Won Conference Championship, 73–36 (Cedar Rapids); Won 2014 United Bowl, 63–46 (Nebraska)
2015	2015	IFL	United		1st	14	0	0	Won Conference Championship, 34–12 (Cedar Rapids); Won 2015 United Bowl, 62–27 (Nebraska)
2016	2016	IFL	United		1st	15	1	0	Won Conference Championship, 54–28 (Cedar Rapids); Won 2016 United Bowl, 55–34 (Spokane)
2017	2017	IFL	United		1st	14	2	0	Won United Conference Championship, 66–32 (Iowa); Lost 2017 United Bowl, 41–50 (Arizona)
2018	2018	IFL			3rd	11	3	0	Won Semifinal 69–68 OT (Arizona); Lost 2018 United Bowl 42–38 (Iowa)
2019		IFL			3rd	11	3	0	Won First Round 50–47 (Tucson); Won Semifinal 52–50 (Iowa); Won 2019 United Bowl 56–53 (Arizona)
2020		IFL			Season cancelled due to COVID-19 pandemic				
2021		IFL			8th	6	7	0	Lost First Round (Arizona) 42–69
2022		IFL	Eastern		5th	8	8	0	
2023		IFL	Eastern		2nd	9	6	0	Won First Round (Massachusetts) 42–39; Won Eastern Conference Championship (Frisco) 45–44; Lost 2023 United Bowl (Bay Area) 41–51
2024		IFL	Eastern		8th	3	13	0	
Totals						256	96	0	All-time regular season record (2000–2024)
Totals						38	8	—	All-time postseason record (2000–2024)
Totals						294	104	0	All-time regular season and postseason record (2000–2024)

== Records vs. opponent ==
- * win forfeited to a loss for insurance violation

Opponent	Overall	Home	Away	Playoff
Allen Wranglers	(1–0)	(0–0)	(1–0)	(0–0)
Arizona Rattlers	(4–7)	(2–3)	(2–4)	(2–2)
Bay Area Panthers	(1–1)	(1–0)	(0–1)	(0–1)
Bemidji Axemen	(3–0)	(1–0)	(2–0)	(0–0)
Billings Outlaws	(14–9)	(11–2)	(3–7)	(3–1)
Billings Wolves	(2–0)	(1–0)	(1–0)	(0–0)
Bismarck Bucks	(7–0)	(3–0)	(4–0)	(0–0)
Bismarck Roughriders	(2–2)	(1–1)	(1–1)	(0–0)
Black Hills/Rapid City Red Dogs	(10–3)	(5–1)	(5–2)	(1–0)
Bloomington Extreme	(6–0)*	(4–0)	(2–0)*	(1–0)
Bricktown Brawlers	(1–0)	(0–0)	(1–0)	(0–0)
Cedar Rapids River Kings	(1–0)	(0–0)	(1–0)	(0–0)
Cedar Rapids Titans	(17–3)	(13–0)	(4–3)	(4–0)
Chicago Slaughter	(4–1)	(3–0)	(1–1)	(1–0)
Colorado Ice/Crush	(16–2)	(9–0)	(7–2)	(1–0)
Evansville BlueCats	(3–0)	(3–0)	(0–0)	(1–0)
Fairbanks Grizzlies	(1–0)	(1–0)	(0–0)	(0–0)
Fort Wayne Freedom	(3–2)	(2–1)	(1–1)	(0–0)
Frisco Fighters	(1–6)	(0–3)	(1–3)	(1–0)
Green Bay Blizzard	(27–4)	(16–2)	(11–2)	(2–0)
Iowa Barnstormers	(16–10)	(8–4)	(8–6)	(2–1)
Jacksonville Sharks	(1–1)	(0–1)	(1–0)	(0–0)
Kent Predators	(1–0)	(0–0)	(1–0)	(0–0)
La Crosse Spartans	(2–0)	(2–0)	(0–0)	(0–0)
Lehigh Valley Steelhawks	(1–0)	(1–0)	(0–0)	(1–0)
Lexington Horsemen	(5–2)	(4–1)	(2–1)	(3–1)
Lincoln Capitols	(4–0)	(2–0)	(2–0)	(0–0)
Louisiana Swashbucklers	(1–0)	(1–0)	(0–0)	(1–0)
Louisiana Bayou Beast	(1–0)	(1–0)	(0–0)	(0–0)
Louisville Xtreme	(1–0)	(0–0)	(1–0)	(0–0)
Massachusetts Pirates	(2–4)	(2–1)	(0–3)	(1–0)
Mississippi Fire Dogs	(0–1)	(0–0)	(0–1)	(0–0)
Muskegon Thunder	(2–0)	(1–0)	(1–0)	(0–0)
Nebraska Danger	(18–1)	(11–0)	(7–1)	(3–0)
Ohio Valley Greyhounds	(2–0)	(1–0)	(1–0)	(0–0)
Omaha Beef	(16–7)*	(9–2)*	(7–5)	(3–0)
Peoria Rough Riders	(2–0)	(2–0)	(0–0)	(0–0)
Quad City Steamwheelers	(5–6)	(3–1)	(2–5)	(0–0)
Reading Express	(1–0)	(0–0)	(1–0)	(0–0)
RiverCity Rage	(2–0)	(1–0)	(1–0)	(0–0)
Rochester Raiders	(1–0)*	(0–0)	(1–0)*	(0–0)
Rock River/Tenn. Valley Raptors	(4–1)	(2–0)	(2–1)	(0–0)
San Diego Strike Force	(1–0)	(1–0)	(0–0)	(0–0)
Sioux City Bandits	(22–6)*	(12–4)	(10–2)*	(1–0)
Spokane Empire	(4–0)	(3–0)	(1–0)	(1–0)
Spokane Shock	(0–2)	(0–1)	(0–1)	(0–0)
Texas Revolution	(4–0)	(2–0)	(2–0)	(0–0)
Tri-Cities Fever	(8–0)	(4–0)	(4–0)	(2–0)
Tri-City Diesel	(3–1)	(2–0)	(1–1)	(0–0)
Tucson Sugar Skulls	(1–1)	(1–0)	(0–1)	(1–0)
Tulsa Oilers	(2–2)	(1–1)	(1–1)	(0–0)
Utah Rattlers	(1–0)	(0–0)	(1–0)	(0–0)
Utah Warriors	(3–3)	(3–0)	(0–3)	(1–1)
Vegas Knight Hawks	(1–0)	(1–0)	(0–0)	(0–0)
Wenatchee Valley Venom	(1–0)	(1–0)	(0–0)	(0–0)
Wichita Falls Nighthawks	(3–2)	(2–1)	(1–1)	(0–0)
Wichita Wild	(9–1)*	(4–1)	(5–0)*	(1–0)
Wyoming Cavalry	(11–3)	(5–1)	(6–2)	(0–1)

== Season schedules (2001–2018) ==
=== 2001 ===
2001 NIFL Central Division Standings
	W	L	PCT	DIV
y-Rapid City Red Dogs	13	1	0.929	10–1
x-Wyoming Cavalry	8	5	0.571	6–4
x-Sioux Falls Storm	7	7	0.500	5–6
Billings Outlaws	7	7	0.500	5–6
Tri-City Diesel	6	8	0.429	3–8
Sioux City Bandits	4	10	0.286	4–8

2001 National Indoor Football League Season Summary

Date	Opponent	Result
April 7	@ Tri City Diesel	Won 42–41
April 14	Billings Outlaws	Won 52–26
April 21	@ Wyoming Cavalry	Won 45–34
April 28	@ Utah Rattlers	Won 78–75
May 5	@ Mississippi Firedogs	Lost 44–33
May 12	Sioux City Bandits	Lost 31–28
May 19	Rapid City Red Dogs	Lost 25–21
May 25	@ Billings Outlaws	Lost 44–39
June 2	@ Rapid City Red Dogs	Lost 44–42
June 9	Sioux City Bandits	Lost 27–24
June 16	Louisiana Bayou Beast	Won 58–21
June 23	@ Sioux City Bandits	Won 23–19
July 7	Wyoming Cavalry	Lost 48–47
July 14	Tri City Diesel	Won 32–30
July 20	@ Rapid City Red Dogs	Won 40–25
July 26	@ Wyoming Cavalry	Lost 37–31

=== 2002 ===
2002 NIFL Pacific Conference Western Division Standings
	W	L	PCT	DIV
y-Bismarck Roughriders	11	3	0.786	9–1
x-Billings Outlaws	10	4	0.714	5–4
Sioux Falls Storm	8	6	0.571	5–3
Rapid City Red Dogs	6	8	0.429	2–7
Wyoming Cavalry	3	11	0.214	1–7

2002 National Indoor Football League Season Summary

Date	Opponent	Result
March 9	@ Bismarck Roughriders	Won 48–20
March 24	Billings Outlaws	Won 51–31
March 30	@ Rapid City Red Dogs	Won 52–40
April 7	Wyoming Cavalry	Won 46–3
April 14	@ Sioux City Bandits	Lost 40–21
April 20	Tri City Diesel	Win 48–34
April 27	@ Omaha Beef	Lost 43–33
May 11	Lincoln Capitols	Win 41–33
May 18	Bismarck Roughriders	Lost 65–58
May 24	@ Tri City Diesel	Lost 51–44
June 1	@ Billings Outlaws	Lost 59–30
June 15	Sioux City Bandits	Won 35–22
June 21	@ Wyoming Cavalry	Lost 53–46
June 29	Rapid City Red Dogs	Won 45–17

=== 2003 ===
2003 NIFL Pacific Conference Northern Division Standings
	W	L	PCT	DIV
y-Utah Warriors	11	3	0.786	7–3
x-Sioux Falls Storm	10	4	0.714	7–3
x-Bismarck Roughriders	9	5	0.643	5–5
Rapid City Red Dogs	7	7	0.500	5–5
Billings Outlaws	6	8	0.429	3–7
Wyoming Cavalry	4	10	0.286	3–7

2003 National Indoor Football League Season Summary

Date	Opponent	Result
March 23	@ Rapid City Red Dogs	Lost 30–26
March 27	@ Lincoln Capitols	Won 31–21
April 5	Wyoming Cavalry	Won 36–18
April 12	@ Billings Outlaws	Won 47–44
April 19	@ Bismarck Roughriders	Lost 55–48
April 26	@ Utah Warriors	Lost 59–35
May 3	@ Fort Wayne Freedom	Lost 55–19
May 10	Sioux City Bandits	Won 43–25
May 17	@ Wyoming Cavalry	Won 58–27
May 24	Billings Outlaws	Won 36–32
June 7	Utah Warriors	Won 47–34
June 14	Fort Wayne Freedom	Won 52–49
June 28	Rapid City Red Dogs	Won 31–23
July 5	Bismarck Roughriders	Won 44–27
July 12	@ Utah Warriors	Lost 68–55

=== 2004 ===
2004 NIFL Pacific Conference Northern Division Standings
	W	L	PCT	PF	PA	DIV
y-Sioux Falls Storm	11	3	0.786	685	467	5–1
x-Omaha Beef	9	5	0.600	600	524	4–2
x-Sioux City Bandits	8	6	0.571	577	552	3–3
Lincoln Capitols	3	11	0.214	408	587	0–5

2004 National Indoor Football League Season Summary

Date	Opponent	Result
March 13	@ Omaha Beef	Lost 41–14
March 22	@ Utah Warriors	Lost 51–49
March 26	@ Sioux City Bandits	Won 66–43
April 3	Wyoming Cavalry	Won 47–13
April 16	@ Lincoln Capitols	Won 34–28
May 1	Black Hills Red Dogs	Won 47–28
May 8	@ Wyoming Cavalry	Won 57–54
May 15	Lincoln Capitols	Won 68–9
May 22	Billings Outlaws	Won 30–21
May 29	Utah Warriors	Won 62–37
June 5	@ Black Hills Red Dogs	Won 62–40
June 12	Billings Outlaws	Lost 44–34
June 19	Omaha Beef	Won 79–26
June 26	Sioux City Bandits	Won 36–32
July 17	Utah Warriors	Won 65–41
July 25	Billings Outlaws	Won 44–13
August 7	Lexington Horsemen	Lost 59–38

=== 2005 ===
2005 UIF Northern Division Standings
	W	L	PCT	DIV
y-Sioux City Bandits	13	2	0.866	8–1
x-Omaha Beef	9	6	0.600	6–3
x-Sioux Falls Storm	8	8	0.500	5–5
Black Hills Red Dogs	1	14	0.066	1–8

2005 United Indoor Football Season Summary

Date	Opponent	Result
March 19	@ Omaha Beef	Lost 55–31
March 26	@ Black Hills Red Dogs	Won 60–31
April 9	Lexington Horsemen	Won 52–24
April 16	Sioux City Bandits	Lost 50–43
April 23	@ Omaha Beef	Won 47–30
April 30	Fort Wayne Freedom	Lost 34–31
May 7	Peoria Rough Riders	Won 56–21
May 15	@ Black Hills Red Dogs	Won 58–30
May 21	Evansville Bluecats	Won 49–42
May 28	Black Hills Red Dogs	Won 55–15
June 11	@ Lexington Horsemen	Lost 61–43
June 18	@ Tennessee Valley Raptors	Lost 49–39
June 25	Sioux City Bandits	Lost 38–34
July 2	Omaha Beef	Lost 49–44
July 9	Black Hills Red Dogs	Won 65–14
July 15	@ Sioux City Bandits	Lost 54–48
July 30	@ Omaha Beef	Won 51–41
August 6	@ Lexington Horsemen	Won 62–58
August 14	@ Sioux City Bandits	Won 40–38

=== 2006 ===
2006 UIF West Division Standings
	W	L	PCT	PF	PA	DIV
y-Sioux Falls Storm	15	0	1.000	684	384	7–0
x-Omaha Beef	8	7	0.533	594	498	2–4
Sioux City Bandits	6	9	0.400	508	513	1–6

2006 United Indoor Football Season Summary

Date	Opponent	Result
March 24	@ Omaha Beef	Won 51–29
April 1	@ Rock River Raptors	Won 46–20
April 8	Sioux City Bandits	Won 28–6
April 15	Rock River Raptors	Won 48–34
April 22	@ Fort Wayne Freedom	Won 47–44
April 29	@ Ohio Valley Greyhounds	Won 51–24
May 6	Fort Wayne Freedom	Won 44–25
May 13	Omaha Beef	Won 34–24
May 20	@ Sioux City Bandits	Won 51–34
June 2	@ Omaha Beef	Won 40–38
June 10	Peoria Rough Riders	Won 71–0
June 17	Sioux City Bandits	Won 25–17
June 24	@ Sioux City Bandits	Won 49–28
July 1	Bloomington Extreme	Won 66–35
July 8	Evansville Bluecats	Won 33–26
July 23	Evansville Bluecats	Won 32–26
July 29	Lexington Horsemen	Won 72–64

=== 2007 ===
2007 UIF Western Conference Standings
	W	L	PCT	PF	PA	CONF
y-Sioux Falls Storm	15	0	1.000	739	366	11–0
x-Billings Outlaws	8	6	0.571	565	511	6–5
x-Omaha Beef	8	7	0.533	489	504	5–6
x-Colorado Ice	6	9	0.400	457	529	5–7
Sioux City Bandits	3	12	0.200	434	654	1–10

2007 United Indoor Football Season Summary

Date	Opponent	Result
March 24	@ Rock River Raptors	Won 44–34
March 31	@ Billings Outlaws	Won 52–49 OT
April 6	@ Sioux City Bandits	Won 44–29
April 14	@ Omaha Beef	Won 61–17
April 21	Billings Outlaws	Won 51–18
May 5	@ Colorado Ice	Won 49–20
May 12	Sioux City Bandits	Won 56–31
May 19	Omaha Beef	Won 33–19
Jun 2	@ Colorado Ice	Won 51–17
June 9	Sioux City Bandits	Won 50–25
June 16	Ohio Valley Greyhounds	Won 56–20
June 23	@ Lexington Horsemen	Won 76–45
June 30	Colorado Ice	Won 48–3
July 7	Rock River Raptors	Won 34–30
July 14	Billings Outlaws	Won 34–9
July 21	Colorado Ice	Won 44–16
July 29	Billings Outlaws	Won 45–23
August 4	Lexington Horsemen	Won 62–59

=== 2008 ===
2008 UIF Western Conference Standings
	W	L	PCT	PF	PA	CONF
y-Sioux Falls Storm	11	3	.786	631	471	3–3
x-Billings Outlaws	10	4	0.714	725	497	5–3
x-Omaha Beef	10	4	0.714	589	463	2–2
Colorado Ice	6	8	0.429	528	568	2–4

2008 United Indoor Football Season Summary

Date	Opponent	Result
March 8	@ Bloomington Extreme	Won 50–37
March 17	Colorado Ice	Won 48–24
March 29	@ Omaha Beef	Lost 34–18
April 5	@ Billings Outlaws	Lost 38–31
April 12	Sioux City Bandits	Won 45–34
April 19	Billings Outlaws	Won 54–43
April 26	@ RiverCity Rage	Won 41–32
May 3	Sioux City Bandits	Won 51–46
May 10	RiverCity Rage	Won 60–13
May 17	Wichita Wild	Won 57–14
May 24	@ Billings Outlaws	Won 62–52
May 31	@ Sioux City Bandits	Won 41–34
June 6	@ Colorado Ice	Lost 29–24
June 14	Bloomington Extreme	Won 49–41
June 28	Billings Outlaws	Won 46–44
July 12	Bloomington Extreme	Won 40–35
August 2	Louisiana Swashbucklers	Won 54–42

=== 2009 ===
2009 IFL United Conference Central Division Standings
	W	L	PCT	PF	PA	DIV
y-Omaha Beef	11	3	0.786	704	649	3–2
x-Bloomington Extreme	10	4	0.714	614	398	5–1
x-Wichita Wild	8	6	0.571	632	513	2–5
*Sioux Falls Storm	6	8	.429	712	455	3–4
Sioux City Bandits	4	10	0.286	450	645	1–8

2009 Indoor Football League Season Summary

Date	Opponent	Result
March 8	@ Bloomington Extreme	Won 50–47 *
March 19	@ Rochester Raiders	Won 31–18 *
March 29	Omaha Beef	Won 67–49 *
April 4	@ Wichita Wild	Won 45–41 *
April 11	@ Sioux City Bandits	Won 46–13 *
April 18	Sioux City Bandits	Won 53–32
April 25	@ Billings Outlaws	Lost 42–41
May 9	Muskegon Thunder	Won 74–13
May 16	Wichita Wild	Won 49–21
May 23	@ Muskegon Thunder	Won 87–26
June 6	@ Billings Outlaws	Lost 70–35
June 13	Billings Outlaws	Lost 34–22
June 20	Fairbanks Grizzlies	Won 58–18
July 11	Sioux City Bandits	Won 54–31

* Forfeited due to insurance violation

=== 2010–2018 ===
- 2010 Sioux Falls Storm season
- 2011 Sioux Falls Storm season
- 2012 Sioux Falls Storm season
- 2013 Sioux Falls Storm season
- 2014 Sioux Falls Storm season
- 2015 Sioux Falls Storm season
- 2016 Sioux Falls Storm season
- 2017 Sioux Falls Storm season
- 2018 Sioux Falls Storm season

== Team player records ==
=== Single season ===
As of the end of the 2022 season

- Pass Attempts: Ryan Aulenbacher, 401 (2002 – 14 games)
- Completions: Chris Dixon, 268 (2012 – 14 games)
- Passing Yards: Chris Dixon, 3,321 (2012 – 14 games)
- Passing Touchdowns: Chris Dixon, 74 (2011 – 14 games)
- Carries: Sean Treasure, 201 (2009 – 14 games)
- Rushing Yards: Sean Treasure, 812 (2009 – 14 games)
- Rushing Touchdowns: Marques Smith, 32 (2007 – 15 games)
- Receptions: James Terry, 94 (2010 – 14 games)
- Receiving Yards: Carl Sims, 1,108 (2012 – 14 games)
- Receiving Touchdowns: Clinton Solomon, 27 (2012 – 14 games)
- Kick Return Yards: James Jones, 1,350 (2005 – 16 games)
- Kick Return Touchdowns: Korey Williams, 5 (2016 – 16 games)
- Missed Field Goal Return Yards: Shannon Poppinga, 237 (2008 – 14 games)
- Missed Field Goal Return Touchdowns: Shannon Poppinga, 2 (2008 – 14 games)
- Field Goal Percentage (Minimum: 20 Attempts): Miles Bergner, 64.7% (2018 – 14 games)
- PAT Percentage (Minimum: 30 Attempts): Parker Douglass, 95.7% (2011 – 14 games)
- Total Yards: James Jones, 2,198 (2005 – 16 games)
- Total Touchdowns: Korey Williams, 34 (2016 – 16 games)
- Field Goals: Parker Douglass, 27 (2013 – 14 games)
- PATs: Parker Douglass, 134 (2011 – 14 games)
- Total Points: Korey Williams, 204 (2016 – 16 games)
- Tackles: Tyler Knight, 140.5 (2016 – 16 games)
- Tackles for Loss: Brandon Peguese, 25.5 (2016 – 16 games)
- Sacks: Nate Fluit, 18.0 (2006 – 15 games)
- Interceptions: Shannon Poppinga, 10 (2005 – 16 games)
- Pass Breakups: Bobby Perkins, 20 (2002 – 14 games)
- Blocked Kicks: Nate Fluit, 10 (2006 – 15 games)

=== Career records ===
As of the end of the 2024 season and does not include the postseason

- Pass Attempts: Terrance Bryant, 2,268
- Completions: Terrance Bryant, 1,491
- Passing Yards: Terrance Bryant, 15,011
- Passing Touchdowns: Lorenzo Brown, 284
- Carries: Lorenzo Brown, 1,090
- Rushing Yards: Lorenzo Brown, 4,288
- Rushing Touchdowns: Lorenzo Brown, 163
- Receptions: James Terry, 607
- Reception Yards: James Terry, 6,601
- Reception Touchdowns: James Terry, 145
- Total Yards: James Terry, 8,417
- Field Goals: Adam Hicks, 131
- FG % (Minimum: 20 Attempts): Miles Bergner, 66.0%
- PATs: Parker Douglass, 584
- PAT % (Minimum: 35 Attempts): Sawyer Petre, 90.1%
- Kick Return Yards: James Jones, 2,469
- Kick Return Touchdowns: Korey Williams, 9
- Missed Field Goal Return Yards: Shannon Poppinga, 416
- Missed Field Goal Return Touchdowns: Shannon Poppinga, 3
- Total Touchdowns: Lorenzo Brown, 182
- Total Points: Lorenzo Brown, 1,096
- Tackles: Mark Blackburn, 715.5
- Tackles for Loss: Rachman Crable, 73.0
- Sacks: Cory Johnsen, 64.5
- Interceptions: Shannon Poppinga, 46
- Interception Touchdowns: Shannon Poppinga, 6
- Pass Breakups: Shannon Poppinga, 109
- Forced Fumbles: Rachman Crable/Cory Johnsen/Tyler Knight, 10
- Blocked Kicks: Tyler Knight, 24
