= Tory Harrison =

American gridiron football player (born 1987)

No. 34, 31, 22
- Position: Running back

Personal information
- Born: December 13, 1987 (age 38); Leesburg, Florida, U.S.
- Listed height: 6 ft 1 in (1.85 m)
- Listed weight: 196 lb (89 kg)

Career information
- High school: Leesburg (FL)
- College: Southern Miss
- NFL draft: 2010: undrafted

Career history
- Green Bay Packers (2010)*; Hartford Colonials (2010); Omaha Beef (2012); Sioux Falls Storm (2013–2014); Calgary Stampeders (2014)*; Sioux Falls Storm (2015); Calgary Stampeders (2015–2017)
- * Offseason or practice squad member only

Awards and highlights
- 2× United Bowl champion (2013, 2014); First Team All-IFL (2014)

Career CFL statistics
- Rushing attempts: 52
- Rushing yards: 222
- Rushing touchdowns: 2
- Receptions: 12
- Receiving yards: 78
- Stats at CFL.ca (archived)

Tory Harrison (born December 13, 1987) is an American former football running back. He played college football at the University of Southern Mississippi.

== Early life ==
Born to Linda Tanner (Harrison), Harrison grew up in Leesburg, Florida, and played high school football at Leesburg High School. Without the help of his parents, Harrison was raised by his aunt. Harrison also has three other siblings. Harrison was also a member of the basketball and track and field teams. He was named a Florida 4A All-State player in 2005.

== College career ==
Harrison played college football as a running back for the Southern Miss Golden Eagles football team from 2006 to 2009.

== Professional career ==
After going undrafted in the 2010 NFL draft, Harrison signed as an undrafted free agent with the Green Bay Packers. Following his release from the Packers, Harrison signed with the Hartford Colonials of the United Football League. In 2012, Harrison signed with the Indoor Football League's Omaha Beef. On April 3, 2017, Harrison was released by the Stampeders.
