= Isaac Snell =

American football player (born 1981)

No. 72
- Position: Guard

Personal information
- Born: November 4, 1981 (age 45); Pipestone, Minnesota, U.S.
- Listed height: 6 ft 6 in (1.98 m)
- Listed weight: 288 lb (131 kg)

Career information
- College: North Dakota State
- NFL draft: 2005: undrafted

Career history
- New York Jets (2005–2006); → Frankfurt Galaxy (2006); Tennessee Titans (2006-2007)*; Denver Broncos (2007–2008); Tennessee Titans (2008)*; Sioux Falls Storm (2009–2010)
- * Offseason or practice squad member only

Isaac Snell (born November 4, 1981) is an American former football guard. He was signed by the New York Jets as an undrafted free agent in 2005. He played college football at North Dakota State. Snell was also a member of the Frankfurt Galaxy, Tennessee Titans, Denver Broncos, and Sioux Falls Storm. On November 22, 2024, he was charged with two counts of vehicular homicide and one count of vehicular assault in Montrose County, Colorado.
