= Brent Little =

American football player (born 1983)

Profile
- Position: Wide receiver

Personal information
- Born: April 3, 1983 (age 43); Poplar Bluff, Missouri, U.S.
- Listed height: 6 ft 0 in (1.83 m)
- Listed weight: 185 lb (84 kg)

Career information
- High school: Poplar Bluff
- College: Southern Illinois
- NFL draft: 2005: undrafted

Career history
- Cleveland Browns (2006)*; Kansas City Chiefs (2007)*; Minnesota Vikings (2008)*; Sioux Falls Storm (2009)
- * Offseason or practice squad member only

Awards and highlights
- First-team All-Gateway (2004); Second-team All-Gateway (2005)

Brent Little (born April 3, 1983) is an American former football wide receiver. He was signed by the Cleveland Browns as an undrafted free agent in 2006. He played college football at Southern Illinois.

Little was also a member of the Kansas City Chiefs, Minnesota Vikings, and Sioux Falls Storm.

He started playing football during his junior year at Poplar Bluff High School, and was named to the All-State first team in 2001.
