= Leif Murphy =

American football player (born 1979)

No. 94, 97
- Position: Defensive end

Personal information
- Born: October 23, 1979 (age 47); Springfield, Minnesota, U.S.
- Listed height: 6 ft 0 in (1.83 m)
- Listed weight: 207 lb (94 kg)

Career information
- High school: Spring Lake Park High School
- College: North Dakota State University

Career history
- Ottawa Renegades (2003); Bismarck Roughriders (2003); Tri-City Diesel (2004); Omaha Beef (2005); Sioux Falls Storm (2007); Grand Rapids Rampage (2008)

Awards and highlights
- Pacific Conference Defensive Player of the Year (2004)

Career statistics
- Games played: 17
- Games started: 16

Leif Murphy (born October 23, 1979) is an American former professional football defensive end.

== Career ==
In Murphy's high school years, he earned the All-State and Defensive Player of the Year awards at Spring Lake Park High School in Minnesota. In college, he was a four-year starter at North Dakota State University from 1999 to 2002, All-America First Team selection as a junior in 2001 after leading the Bison with 11 sacks. He completed his collegiate career with 129 tackles and 22 sacks.

Murphy began the 2003 season with the Canadian Football League's Ottawa Renegades before joining the Bismarck Roughriders of the National Indoor Football League (NIFL). Next year in 2004 he played for the Tri-City Diesel of the NIFL, and was named Pacific Conference Defensive Player of the Year.

He played for the United Bowl Champion Sioux Falls Storm in 2007, and the Omaha Beef in 2005 and 2006. Both teams were members of United Indoor Football. He was named All-UIF all three seasons. He was part of the Sioux Falls Storm's record 40 game winning streak.

In 2008, as a member of the Grand Rapids Rampage, of the Arena Football League, he was second on the team in sacks despite seeing limited action due to injury.
