= Mike Siani (American football) =

American football player (born 1950)

No. 49, 45
- Position: Wide receiver

Personal information
- Born: May 27, 1950 (age 76); Staten Island, New York, U.S.
- Listed height: 6 ft 2 in (1.88 m)
- Listed weight: 195 lb (88 kg)

Career information
- High school: Staten Island (NY) New Dorp
- College: Villanova
- NFL draft: 1972: 1st round, 21st overall pick

Career history

Playing
- Oakland Raiders (1972–1977); Baltimore Colts (1978–1980)

Coaching
- Myrtle Beach Stingrays (Asst./Interim HC) (2003); Atlantic City CardSharks (2004); Fayetteville Guard (2005–2006); Florence Phantoms (Interim HC) (2007); Princeton (QB/WR) (2009); Richmond Raiders (2010)

Operations
- New Orleans Saints (Scout) (2007–2008)

Awards and highlights
- Super Bowl champion (XI); Second-team All-American (1971); 2× First-team All-East (1970, 1971)

Career NFL statistics
- Receptions: 158
- Receiving yards: 2,618
- Receiving touchdowns: 17
- Stats at Pro Football Reference

Mike Siani (born May 27, 1950) is an American former professional football player who was a wide receiver for nine seasons in the National Football League (NFL) for the Oakland Raiders and Baltimore Colts.

== Early life ==
Siani was a high school football star with the New Dorp High School "Centrals", in New Dorp, Staten Island, New York City, New York, graduating in 1968. At New Dorp, Siani played for legendary coach Sal Somma. Somma and Siani have been inducted into the Staten Island Sports Hall of Fame.

== College career ==
Siani attended Villanova University, where he not only played football but also excelled in baseball. Between 1968 (when he was still in high school) and 1972, Siani was selected on four occasions by three Major League organizations (the New York Yankees, the Los Angeles Dodgers, and the Texas Rangers), but he never signed.

On the football field Siani wore number 88 and earned close to 30 achievement awards. He was selected to the 1971 College Football All-America Team. Siani was inducted into the Villanova University Sports Hall of Fame in 1988.

== Professional career ==
Siani was the first round draft choice of the Oakland Raiders in the 1972 NFL draft. In 1972, his first year in Oakland, he set multiple rookie team records for receiving and finished as the runner-up to Franco Harris as NFL Rookie of the Year. He played for the Raiders through 1977, appearing in 74 games with 32 starts, and he caught 128 passes for 2,079 yards and 13 TDs. With the Raiders having a surplus of wide receivers, the team traded Siani along with a 1979 third-round selection (72nd overall–traded to Houston Oilers) to the Colts for Raymond Chester and a 1979 second-round pick (33rd overall–traded to Tampa Bay Buccaneers for Dave Pear) on July 21, 1978. Siani played three seasons with the Colts before finishing his NFL career in 1980.

== NFL career statistics ==
Legend
	Won the Super Bowl
**Bold**	Career high

=== Regular season ===
Year	Team	Games		Receiving				
Year	Team	GP	GS	Rec	Yds	Avg	Lng	TD
1972	OAK	**14**	13	28	496	17.7	70	**5**
1973	OAK	**14**	**14**	**45**	**742**	16.5	**80**	3
1974	OAK	6	0	3	30	10.0	13	1
1975	OAK	**14**	4	17	294	17.3	44	0
1976	OAK	14	1	11	173	15.7	37	2
1977	OAK	12	0	24	344	14.3	39	2
1978	BAL	7	0	6	151	**25.2**	49	1
1979	BAL	10	5	15	214	14.3	31	2
1980	BAL	10	1	9	174	19.3	38	1
		101	38	158	2,618	16.6	80	17

=== Playoffs ===
Year	Team	Games		Receiving				
Year	Team	GP	GS	Rec	Yds	Avg	Lng	TD
1972	OAK	1	1	1	7	7.0	7	0
1973	OAK	**2**	**2**	**8**	113	14.1	**25**	1
1975	OAK	**2**	**2**	**8**	**115**	**14.4**	23	**2**
1976	OAK	**2**	0	0	0	0.0	0	0
1977	OAK	**2**	0	1	12	12.0	12	0
		9	5	18	247	13.7	25	3

== Personal life ==
When his playing career ended, Siani was an indoor football coach for several teams, being named the interim head coach for the Myrtle Beach Stingrays, Fayetteville Guard and Florence Phantoms. He was named the head coach of the Atlantic City CardSharks in 2004, and the Richmond Raiders of the American Indoor Football Association in 2010. Siani has been employed as a scout for the New Orleans Saints, and was the quarterbacks and wide receivers coach for the Princeton Tigers Varsity Sprint Football program in 2009.

Major League Baseball player Michael Siani is a distant relative of Siani's.

== Books ==
“Cheating is Encouraged: A Hard-Nosed History of the 1970s Raiders” was authored by Mike Siani and Kristine Setting Clark.
