= Tyler Knight =

American football player (born 1984)

Omaha Beef
- Title: Assistant head coach & Defensive coordinator

Personal information
- Born: December 22, 1984 (age 41); Little Rock, Arkansas, U.S.
- Listed height: 6 ft 0 in (1.83 m)
- Listed weight: 225 lb (102 kg)

Career information
- High school: Little Rock (AR) McClellan Magnet
- College: Mississippi Valley State
- NFL draft: 2007: undrafted

Career history

Playing
- Arkansas Diamonds (2010); Sioux Falls Storm (2011); Kansas City Command (2012); Sioux Falls Storm (2013–2017); Sioux City Bandits (2022)

Coaching
- Omaha Beef (2024–present) Assistant head coach & Defensive coordinator

Awards and highlights
- 2× All-SWAC (2005, 2006); SWAC Defensive Player of the Year (2005); 5× United Bowl champion (2011, 2013–2016); 2× IFL Defensive Player of the Year (2013, 2014); 3× 1st Team All-IFL (2013, 2014), 2016); IFL's Top 10 Players #2 (2013); 2× 2nd Team All-IFL (2015, 2017)

Career AFL statistics
- Tackles: 20
- Sacks: 1
- Pass Breakups: 3
- Stats at ArenaFan.com

Tyler Knight (born December 22, 1984) is an American football coach and former linebacker who is the assistant head coach and defensive coordinator for the Omaha Beef of the National Arena League (NAL). He played college football at Mississippi Valley State, and currently plays for the Sioux City Bandits.

== Early life ==
Knight prepped at McClellan Magnet High School in Little Rock, Arkansas.

== College career ==
Knight attended Mississippi Valley State University after high school. After his junior season in 2005, Knight was named the Southwestern Athletic Conference (SWAC) Defensive Player of the Year, earning 1st Team All-SWAC honors. Knight was picked as the preseason 2006 SWAC Defensive Player of the Year, but couldn't reclaim the title, but he was still named First Team All-SWAC.

== Professional career ==
=== Arkansas Diamonds ===
In 2010, Knight began playing with the Arkansas Diamonds of the Indoor Football League (IFL). Knight helped the Diamonds to an 11–3 regular season record, and a berth in the Intense Conference Finals, where they were defeated 53–42 by the Billings Outlaws.

=== Sioux Falls Storm ===
In 2011, Sioux Falls Storm signed Knight. Knight had 104 tackles, leading the IFL, and helping the Storm win the United Bowl.

=== Kansas City Command ===
After a great 2011 season, Knight signed with the Kansas City Command of the Arena Football League (AFL). At the conclusion of the 2012 season, the Command folded.

=== Return to Sioux Falls ===
Knight returned to Sioux Falls in 2013. Knight lead the Storm to yet another title, and was named the IFL Defensive Player of the Year. In 2016, Knight was named a Second Team All-IFL selection. Knight was named Second Team All-IFL in 2017.

== Coaching career ==
=== Omaha Beef ===
On January 10, 2024, Knight was hired as the assistant head coach and defensive coordinator for the Omaha Beef of the National Arena League (NAL).
