= Adam Hicks (American football) =

American football coach

Current position
- Title: Defensive coordinator & linebackers coach
- Team: Tyler
- Conference: SWJCFC

Biographical details
- Born: South Fulton, Tennessee, U.S.
- Education: University of Tennessee (2009); University of Memphis (2015)

Coaching career (HC unless noted)
- 2009–2011: Ole Miss (QC)
- 2012–2014: Memphis (def. assistant)
- 2015–2016: Missouri (def. assistant)
- 2017: Missouri (ILB)
- 2018–2022: Clarke (DC)
- 2023–2025: Clarke
- 2026–present: Tyler (DC/LB)

Head coaching record
- Overall: 6–27

Adam Hicks (born c. 1987) is an American college football coach. He is the defensive coordinator and linebackers coach for Tyler Junior College, a position he has held since 2026. He served as the head football coach at Clarke University from 2023 to 2025. Before becoming the head football coach at Clarke, Hicks spent time as the program's defensive coordinator. He also coached for Ole Miss, Memphis, and Missouri.

== Head coaching record ==
Year	Team	Overall	Conference	Standing	Bowl/playoffs
Clarke Pride (Heart of America Athletic Conference) (2023–2025)
2023	Clarke	3–8	2–3	T–4th (North)	
2024	Clarke	1–10	0–6	7th (North)	
2025	Clarke	2–9	1–5	T–6th (North)	
Clarke:		6–27	3–14		
Total:		6–27			
