= Myniya Smith =

American football player (born 1981)

Profile
- Position: Offensive lineman

Personal information
- Born: July 21, 1981 (age 45); New Orleans, Louisiana
- Listed height: 6 ft 7 in (2.01 m)
- Listed weight: 327 lb (148 kg)

Career information
- High school: Harvey (LA) West Jefferson
- College: Southern
- NFL draft: 2005: undrafted

Career history
- Houston Texans (2005)*; New York Giants (2005)*; Utah Blaze (2007–2008); New York Giants (2007)*; Billings Outlaws (2009–2010); Sioux Falls Storm (2011–2017); Spokane Shock (2013–2014)*; Spokane Empire (2017); Sioux Falls Storm (2017)
- * Offseason or practice squad member only

Awards and highlights
- 5× 1st Team All-IFL (2011–2014, 2016); IFL's Top 10 Players #4 (2013); 8× United Bowl champion (2009–2016)

Career AFL statistics
- Receptions: 5
- Receiving yards: 41
- Receiving TDs: 1
- Tackles: 1
- Stats at ArenaFan.com

Myniya Smith (born July 21, 1981) is a former professional indoor football offensive lineman. He was signed by the New York Giants as an undrafted free agent in 2005. He played college football at Southern. Following the 2016 IFL season, Smith was named First Team All-IFL. On April 20, 2017, Smith signed with the Spokane Empire. On May 4, 2017, Smith was released by the Empire. On June 6, 2017, Smith signed with the Sioux Falls Storm.
