= 2014 United Bowl =

Nebraska Danger	Sioux Falls Storm
(11–4)	(14–1)
Intense	United
46	63
Head coach: Mike Davis	Head coach: Kurtiss Riggs
	1	2	3	4	Total
Nebraska	7	7	7	25	46
Sioux Falls	7	21	14	21	63
- Date: June 28, 2014
- Stadium: Sioux Falls Arena
- Location: Sioux Falls, South Dakota, U.S.
- MVP: Sioux Falls QB Chris Dixon, Sioux Falls WR James Terry
- Referee: Jim Schaefer
- Attendance: 4,500

The 2014 United Bowl was the sixth title game of the Indoor Football League (IFL). It was played on June 28, 2014, at the Sioux Falls Arena in Sioux Falls, South Dakota. Both teams participated in the previous year's game. The top seed in the United Conference, the Sioux Falls Storm, defeated the second seed in the Intense Conference, the Nebraska Danger 63–46.

== Road to the United Bowl ==
2014 Intense Conference
	W	L	T	PCT	PF	PA	GB	STK
y - Colorado Ice	10	4	0	.714	708	503	0.0	L1
x - Nebraska Danger	10	4	0	.714	684	540	0.0	W1
Tri-Cities Fever	8	6	0	.571	761	671	2.0	W5
Wyoming Cavalry	1	13	0	.071	441	931	9.0	L10

2014 United Conference
	W	L	T	PCT	PF	PA	GB	STK
y - Sioux Falls Storm	13	1	0	.929	754	500	0.0	L1
x - Cedar Rapids Titans	11	3	0	.786	689	597	2.0	W2
Bemidji Axemen	5	9	0	.357	592	624	8.0	L5
Texas Revolution	3	11	0	.214	532	641	10.0	L2
Green Bay Blizzard	2	12	0	.143	615	769	11.0	W1

Conference Championships
1	Sioux Falls	73
2	Cedar Rapids	36
1	Colorado	15
2	Nebraska	45

2014 United Bowl
U1	Sioux Falls	63
I2	Nebraska	46
