= Indoor Bowl =

The Indoor Bowl was the main championship game of the National Indoor Football League (NIFL). In 2001, it was played between the top two teams who survived the eight-team playoff format. Since 2002, it has been played between the Atlantic Conference champion and the Pacific Conference champion.

== Games ==
=== Indoor Bowl results ===
| Game | Year | Winning team | | Losing team | | Site |
|---|---|---|---|---|---|---|
| Indoor Bowl I | 2001 | Mississippi Fire Dogs | 55 | Wyoming Cavalry | 12 | Mississippi Coast Coliseum |
| Indoor Bowl II | 2002 | Ohio Valley Greyhounds | 55 | Billings Outlaws | 52 | WesBanco Arena |
| Indoor Bowl III | 2003 | Ohio Valley Greyhounds | 45 | Utah Warriors | 37 | WesBanco Arena |
| Indoor Bowl IV | 2004 | Lexington Horsemen | 59 | Sioux Falls Storm | 38 | Sioux Falls Arena |
| Indoor Bowl V | 2005 | Tri-Cities Fever | 47 | Rome Renegades | 31 | Toyota Center |
| Indoor Bowl VI | 2006 | Billings Outlaws | 56 | Fayetteville Guard | 38 | MetraPark Arena |
| Indoor Football Championship Bowl | 2007 | Fayetteville Guard | 48 | Wyoming Cavalry | 34 | Cumberland County Crown Coliseum |

=== Indoor Bowl appearances ===
Billings Outlaws: 2 (lost 1), (won 1)
Fayetteville Guard: 2 (won 1), (lost 1)
Ohio Valley Greyhounds: 2 (won 2)
Lexington Horsemen: 1 (won 1)
Mississippi Fire Dogs: 1 (won 1)
Rome Renegades: 1 (lost 1)
Sioux Falls Storm: 1 (lost 1)
Tri-Cities Fever: 1 (won 1)
Utah Warriors: 1 (lost 1)
Wyoming Cavalry: 2 (lost 2)
