= Gerald Davis (Canadian football) =

American gridiron football player (born 1985)

No. 63, 71
- Position: Offensive lineman

Personal information
- Born: December 12, 1985 (age 40); Greensboro, Georgia, U.S.
- Listed height: 6 ft 4 in (1.93 m)
- Listed weight: 300 lb (136 kg)

Career information
- College: Valdosta State
- NFL draft: 2008: undrafted

Career history
- Hamilton Tiger-Cats (2008); Edmonton Eskimos (2009)*; Billings Outlaws (2010); Sioux Falls Storm (2011–2013)
- * Offseason or practice squad member only

Awards and highlights
- 4× United Bowl champion (2010–2013)
- Stats at CFL.ca (archive)

Gerald Davis (born December 12, 1985) is an American former professional football offensive lineman. He played college football for the Valdosta State Blazers. Davis was a member of the New Orleans Saints, Hamilton Tiger-Cats, Edmonton Eskimos, Billings Outlaws and Sioux Falls Storm. He has also been a graduate assistant at Augustana College.
