= Parker Douglass =

American football player (born 1985)

No. 11, 3
- Position: Placekicker

Personal information
- Born: June 25, 1985 (age 41); Columbus, Nebraska, U.S.
- Listed height: 5 ft 8 in (1.73 m)
- Listed weight: 175 lb (79 kg)

Career information
- High school: Columbus
- College: South Dakota State
- NFL draft: 2008: undrafted

Career history
- Sioux Falls Storm (2009); Cleveland Browns (2009)*; New York Jets (2009)*; California Redwoods (2009); Las Vegas Locomotives (2010); Sioux Falls Storm (2011–2015); Sioux Falls Storm (2019–2019)
- * Offseason or practice squad member only

Awards and highlights
- 6× United Bowl champion (2011–2015, 2019); Second-team All-IFL (2014); 3× First-team All-GWFC (2005–2007); GWFC Special Teams P.O.Y. (2006)

Parker Douglass (born June 25, 1985) is an American former football placekicker. He was signed by the Sioux Falls Storm as a street free agent in 2009. He played college football at South Dakota State.

Douglass has also been a member of the Cleveland Browns, New York Jets, California Redwoods, and Las Vegas Locomotives.
