= Kentucky Horsemen =

American indoor football team

Logo

General information
- Founded: 2002
- Folded: 2009
- Headquartered: Rupp Arena in Lexington, Kentucky
- Colors: Royal blue, black, white
- Mascot: Spike

Personnel
- Owner: Horsemen Charitable Foundation
- Head coach: Tommy Johnson

Team history
- Lexington Horsemen (2003–2008); Kentucky Horsemen (2009)

Home fields
- Rupp Arena (2003–2009)

League / conference affiliations
- National Indoor Football League (2003–2004): Atlantic Conference (2003–2004); Eastern Division (2003); Northern Division (2004); United Indoor Football (2005–2007): Southern Division (2005); Eastern Division (2006–2007); af2 (2008–2009): American Conference (2008–2009); Midwest Division (2008); South Division (2009)

Championships
- League championships: 1: 2004
- Division championships: 4: 2004, 2005, 2006, 2007

Playoff appearances (8)
- 2003, 2004, 2005, 2006, 2007, 2008, 2009

The Kentucky Horsemen (known as the Lexington Horsemen from 2003 to 2009) was an indoor football team based in Lexington, Kentucky. The team played its home games at Rupp Arena. The organization began as a 2003 expansion member of the National Indoor Football League, where they were successful. Following the 2004 season, where they defeated the Sioux Falls Storm to win Indoor Bowl IV, the Horsemen and other NIFL teams joined the new United Indoor Football (UIF) as a charter member, where they made the playoffs. They lost to the Sioux Falls Storm. They made the playoffs again in 2006 and advanced to United Bowl II where they lost to the Sioux Falls Storm. From 2008 to 2009, the Horsemen played in the AF2. The team announced intentions to compete in the new Arena Football League following the dissolution of the AF2, but instead ceased operations in October 2009.

== History ==
During the 2007 season, the Horsemen finished with an 8–7 regular season record and then advanced through the playoffs to United Bowl III. They faced the undefeated Sioux Falls Storm and lost the game 62–59 after Collin Barber missed the potential game-tying field goal. The game was head coach Mike Zuckerman's final game.

The team's official mascot is Spike, a hero-like horseman.

=== The end, but then a new beginning ===
On August 22, 2007, Horsemen owner Lennie House announced that the Horsemen had played their final game. He cited poor attendance and lowered revenue, a fate not unusual for UIF teams.

However, on October 16, 2007, House opted to remain in operations by announcing that he changed his mind and the Horsemen would be playing the 2008 season in arenafootball2, where they would have an in-state rivalry ("The War on I-64") with the Louisville Fire. The Horsemen adopted new jerseys that included a slight change in their blue color scheme.

=== Changes in 2009 ===
The Horsemen saw numerous changes occur after the 2008 season. Most notably, ownership changed hands from the House family to the newly formed non-profit Horsemen Charitable Foundation. The foundation was spearheaded by former Horsemen general manager Brian Boehm in an effort to keep Central Kentucky from losing yet another professional sports team.

=== The end of the franchise ===
Just when they were about to play in the new Arena Football League in 2010, the team shut down operations due to financial situations. However, on the team's official website, a newly designed logo is shown with "Don't count us out yet!" underneath, possibly hinting at the team making a comeback.

== Season-by-season ==
Season records
Season	W	L	T	Finish	Playoff results
Lexington Horsemen (NIFL)
2003	9	6	0	2nd Atlantic Eastern	Lost Round 1 (Ohio Valley 51–42)
2004	10	4	0	1st Atlantic North	Won Round 1 (Atlantic City 54–25); Won Atlantic Semi-Final (Houma 70–63); Won Atlantic Conference Championship (Ohio Valley 35–34); Won Indoor Bowl IV (Sioux Falls 59–38)
Lexington Horsemen (UIF)
2005	11	4	0	1st South	Won Round 1 (Evansville 55–50); Lost Semifinals (Sioux Falls 62–58)
2006	13	2	0	1st East	Won Semifinals (Rock River 47–34); Lost United Bowl II (Sioux Falls 72–64)
2007	8	7	0	3rd East	Won Round 1 (River City 48–33); Won Eastern Championship (Bloomington 67–49); Lost United Bowl III (Sioux Falls 62–59)
Lexington Horsemen (af2)
2008	9	7	0	3rd AC Midwest	Lost AC Round 1 (Green Bay 65–37)
Kentucky Horsemen (af2)
2009	10	6	0	3rd AC South	Won AC Round 1 (South Georgia 66–63); Lost AC Semifinal (Wilkes-Barre/Scranton 82–49)
Totals	79	42	0	(including NIFL, UIF, & AF2 playoffs)	

== Highlights ==
First game

- On March 29, 2003, the Horsemen played their first game in front of a crowd of 10,004 in Rupp Arena. They lost to the Lake Charles Land Sharks 41–50.

Indoor Bowl IV

- In their second season (2004), the Horsemen beat the Sioux Falls Storm in Sioux Falls 59–38 to win the Indoor Bowl Championship.

United Bowl II

- Under first year QB Eddie Eviston, the Horsemen lost to the undefeated Sioux Falls Storm 64–72 in United Bowl II. The Storm still retain that streak as of July 22, 2007

Road to United Bowl III

- After leaving the team to play for the Cincinnati Jungle Kats of the AF2 quarterback, Eddie Eviston returned to play in a July 22, 2007 playoff game against the River City Rage. They won the game 48-33 and advanced to the Eastern Conference championship with home field advantage.
- In the same game, running back Rayshawn Askew tied Hall of Fame NFL wide receiver Jerry Rice for most touchdowns by a professional football player with 208. The following week in the eastern conference championship Askew broke the record on a touchdown catch from Eddie Eviston. The Horsemen won and advanced to the United Bowl.

=== Former head coaches ===
- 2003 – Tony Franklin
- 2004–2005 – Bob Sphire
- 2006–2007 – Mike Zuckerman
- 2008–2009 – Mike Harmon
- 2009 – Tommy Johnson

== Notable players ==
QB - Lee Teegarden, Backup QB - Eddie Eviston
