= Lake Charles Land Sharks =

National Indoor Football League team

General information
- Founded: 2000
- Folded: 2004
- Headquartered: Sudduth Coliseum in Lake Charles, Louisiana
- Colors: Red, Old Gold, White

Team history
- Lake Charles Land Sharks (2001-2004)

Home fields
- Sudduth Coliseum (2001-2004)

League / conference affiliations
- National Indoor Football League (2001-2004)

The Lake Charles Land Sharks were an indoor football team. They were a charter member of the National Indoor Football League (NIFL). They played their home games at the Sudduth Coliseum in Lake Charles, Louisiana. Despite having pretty good success throughout their existence, the team folded after the 2004 season and were replaced by the Louisiana Swashbucklers.

== Season-by-Season ==
Season records
Season	W	L	T	Finish	Playoff results
2001	7	3	0	2nd South	Lost Round 1 (Ohio Valley)
2002	13	2	0	1st Atlantic South	Lost Round 1 (T. ThunderCats)
2003	13	3	0	1st Atlantic South	Won Round 1 (Houma Bayou Bucks); Lost AC Championship (Ohio Valley)
2004	7	7	0	4th Atlantic South	--
Totals	41	18	0	(including playoffs)	
