= Utah Warriors (indoor football) =

Indoor football team based in West Valley City, Utah

- Founded: 2003
- League: National Indoor Football League
- Team history: Utah Warriors (2003–2004)
- Based in: West Valley City, Utah
- Arena: E-Center
- Colors: Gold, black, white
- President: Doug Tate
- Head coach: Lee Leslie
- Championships: 0

The Utah Warriors were an indoor football team based in West Valley City, Utah. The Warriors played in the National Indoor Football League. The Warriors joined the NIFL in 2003 as an expansion team. The Warriors were the fourth indoor football team to be based in the Salt Lake City area, the first being the Indoor Professional Football League members, the Utah Catzz in 1998, the Utah Rattlers, who had an ownership change, and the name changed to the Utah Express, also of the NIFL in 2001. The Warriors played their home games at the E-Center in the suburb of West Valley City, Utah.

The Warriors joined the NIFL at the beginning of the 2003 season, but disbanded after of the 2004 season, so the franchise owners could prepare to launch an Arena Football League team, the Utah Blaze, for the 2006 season. The Warriors reached the league championship game during their first season, falling to the Ohio Valley Greyhounds 45–37.

== Franchise history ==
In 2003, team President Doug Tate made reference to the Warriors' ability to secure the E-Center as their home field, that the team would have a greater chance of staying around unlike the Utah Catzz and Utah Rattlers/Express before them.

== Season-by-season ==
Season records
Season	W	L	T	Finish	Playoff results
2003	13	4	0	1st PC Western	Won Round 1 (Sioux Falls); Won Semifinals (Omaha); Lost Indoor Bowl III (Ohio Valley)
2004	7	8	0	2nd PC Western	Won PC Round 1 (Tri-City); Lost PC Quarterfinals (Sioux Falls)
Totals	23	14	0	(including playoffs)	
