= Rapid City Flying Aces =

Former professional indoor American football team

Logo

General information
- Founded: 2000
- Folded: 2006
- Headquartered: Don Barnett Arena in Rapid City, South Dakota
- Colors: Black, brick red, white

Personnel
- Owner: Howard Neal
- Head coach: Dan Majiejczak

Team history
- Black Hills Machine (2000); Rapid City Red Dogs (2001–2003); Black Hills Red Dogs (2004–2005); Rapid City Flying Aces (2006)

Home fields
- Don Barnett Arena (2000–2006)

League / conference affiliations
- Indoor Football League (2000): Western Conference (2000); Northern Division (2000); National Indoor Football League (2001–2004, 2006); United Indoor Football (2005): Northern Division (2005)

Playoff appearances (3)
- IFL: 2000; NIFL: 2001, 2006

The Rapid City Flying Aces were a professional indoor American football team in Rapid City, South Dakota. Like their predecessors, the Black Hills Red Dogs, they played their home games at the Don Barnett Arena in Rapid City. As of April 2007, the Flying Aces did not belong to any football league. The team was affiliated with the original Indoor Football League in 2000; with the National Indoor Football League from 2001 to 2004 and in 2006; and with United Indoor Football in 2005. The team considered rejoining United Indoor Football in 2008.

The Flying Aces won at least 10 out of 14 games three times in their seven seasons; however, organizational turmoil threatened the existence of the franchise.

== History ==
=== 2000–2005 ===
The team began play as the Black Hills Machine of the Indoor Football League in 2000. They lost in the first round of the playoffs to the Topeka Kings. When the IFL folded, the franchise moved to the newly formed National Indoor Football League as a charter member and became the Rapid City Red Dogs. The team played in the NIFL from 2001 to 2003. In 2004, the franchise renamed itself the Black Hills Red Dogs. In 2005, the Red Dogs joined the United Indoor Football as a charter member and won a single game during their inaugural season in the UIF. Also in 2005, the team signed quarterback Chris Dixon. Dixon would later become the first indoor football player to throw for 500 touchdowns in his career.

=== 2006 season ===
In 2006, the franchise moved back to the NIFL and became the Rapid City Flying Aces. During the 2006 season, they began the season 8–0. It appeared the team was going to fold when owner Howard Neal left the franchise in a financial mess; However, several local investors helped pay the bills and save the team. The team went on to the Pacific Conference title game, where they lost to the Billings Outlaws.

Unfortunately, there was not enough time to save the team and the franchise would fold in December 2006. Former owner Howard Weiner, who went by the alias "Howard Neal", was sentenced to four months in prison after admitting to committing bank fraud and was also sentenced to five years of probation and ordered to pay $116,000 in restitution. He had until July 18, 2011, to turn himself in at the Coleman Federal Correctional Complex in Coleman, Florida.

== Season-by-season ==
Season records
Season	W	L	T	Finish	Playoff results
Black Hills Machine (IFL)
2000	10	4	0	2nd WC Northern	Lost Round 1 (Topeka)
Rapid City Red Dogs (NIFL)
2001	13	1	0	1st PC Central	Lost Round 1 (Sioux Falls)
2002	6	8	0	4th PC Western	—
2003	7	7	0	3rd PC Western	—
Black Hills Red Dogs (NIFL)
2004	3	11	0	4th PC Western	—
Black Hills Red Dogs (UIF)
2005	1	14	0	4th North	—
Rapid City Flying Aces (NIFL)
2006	11	3	0	1st Pacific West	Won Pacific Semi-Final (Katy); Lost Pacific Championship (Billings)
Totals	52	51	0	(including playoffs)	

== Notable players ==
- Tony Case
- Chris Dixon
- Renz Julian – American rapper
- Scott Pingel
