= Evansville BlueCats =

Logo

General information
- Founded: 2003
- Folded: 2007
- Headquartered: Evansville, Indiana at the Roberts Municipal Stadium
- Colors: Blue, orange
- Mascot: T.D. Fiddler

Personnel
- Owners: Ed, Ann, John & Tara Voliva
- Head coach: John Hart

Team history
- Evansville BlueCats (2003–2007)

Home fields
- Roberts Municipal Stadium (2003–2007)

League / conference affiliations
- National Indoor Football League (2003–2004); United Indoor Football (2005–2007)

The Evansville BlueCats were a professional indoor football team based in Evansville, Indiana. They were a member of the United Indoor Football Association (UIF). They debuted in 2003 as a member of the National Indoor Football League.

== Location ==
Evansville is located along the Ohio River in southwest Indiana. The BlueCats played their home games at Roberts Municipal Stadium. The stadium seating capacity when configured for Evansville BlueCats football is 11,310.

== The name BlueCats ==
According to the team, the proper and official way to spell the team name, Evansville BlueCats, was with a capital "C" in the word BlueCats. Evansville is a river city and the blue cat, part of the Catfish family, is the largest fish found in the Ohio River, often growing to over 100 pounds. Originally called the 'Rivertown Mudcats' (before being announced), the team's founder, Michael Arnold, changed the name to Evansville BlueCats to reflect that the blue cat is particularly known for its strength and endurance. The BlueCats mascot, T. D. Fiddler, was a giant, walking, kid-friendly catfish that resembled the BlueCats logo.

== History ==
In 2001, Michael Arnold received NIFL franchise rights to build a team in Evansville, and after months of site surveys and putting together a business plan, Arnold went to the city for approval. The city wanted to see samples from the league, so Arnold and SMG Director Sandy Aaron went before the Evansville Parks and Rec. with video samples and letters from the NIFL. Local media jumped all over the concept and the word was quickly published making front-page news. In early 2002, Arnold and League President Carolyn Shiver spent hours in the league ownership meetings, in Denver, attempting to get a 'Short Field' variance for Roberts Stadium. They were successful and the Evansville Bluecats were due to kick off in March 2002, but Arnold and city officials felt that it was too quick as the funds had not been developed yet, so the kickoff was postponed until 2003. After months of working long hours and much planning, Arnold was able to secure a group of local investors and went to work on building the team. On March 23, 2003, the Evansville Bluecats kicked off indoor football in Roberts Stadium with a crowd of almost 9000 fans and 92 cheerleaders leading the chant "BlueCats"! In their inaugural season the Bluecats were led by Head Coach and Defensive Coordinator Avery Atadero, Offensive Coordinator John Hart, Offensive line coach Tim Shipp, and Defensive Line Coach Greg Myers. The franchise, after a tough year of growing pains, was sold to new owners in 2004 and was closed after year five in 2007.

== Fans – Booster Club ==
The Evansville BlueCats Booster Club, also known as the "FinHeads", were a unique organization within the ranks of the United Indoor Football family. The "FinHeads" were more than just a fan group, they were the only UIF Booster Club in the league that was registered with the government and was classified as a 501c non-profit organization. The Booster Club had a written Mission Statement and Code of By Laws, as well as a Board of Directors with elected officers. The Club raised their funds through membership dues, Booster Club sponsorships, and half pot drawings at BlueCats home games.

== Cheerleaders ==
The Evansville BlueCats had three cheerleader/dance teams organized by age. The Baby Blues and Junior Blues were for children and the Evansville BlueCats professional cheerleading team was made up of adults. The adult cheerleaders won the NIFL "Best Dance Team" award in back-to-back seasons in 2003 and 2004, and were known around the league and around the country as one of the elite cheer/dance programs in minor league sports.

== The 2006 season ==
John Hart took over as the head coach of the Evansville BlueCats prior to the 2006 season and led the team to their best season ever. In 2006, the Evansville BlueCats got off to a slow start (1–4) but rebounded in the second half of the season to win four of their last five games of the regular season and clinch a playoff berth for the second consecutive season. Evansville earned the #5 seed in the UIF playoffs. The team continued their late season surge in the playoffs and claimed an impressive 37–15 road win over the Omaha Beef in the first round. Evansville lost by only 6 points, 32–26, to the #1 seed and unbeaten Sioux Falls Storm in the UIF semi-finals. Sioux Falls went on to win the League Championship a week later. Coach Hart was named as the UIF Coach of the Year "Honorable Mention" by the league following the 2006 season. Coach Hart also served as Head Coach in 2007.

== Season-by-season records ==
Season records
Season	W	L	T	Finish	Playoff results
Evansville BlueCats (NIFL)
2003	1	13	0	6th Atlantic Eastern	–
2004	4	10	0	4th Atlantic North	–
Evansville BlueCats (UIF)
2005	7	8	0	2nd South	Lost Round 1 (Lexington)
2006	8	9	0	2nd East	Won Round 1 (Omaha); Lost Semifinal (Sioux Falls)
2007	5	10	0	5th East	–
Totals	25	50	0	(including playoffs)	

== Head coaches ==
- John Hart (2006–2007)
- Ollie Guidry (2004–2005)
- Avery Atadero (2003)

== Notable players ==
See Category:Evansville BlueCats players
