= United Indoor Football =

Indoor American football league

- Sport: American football
- Founded: 2005
- Folded: 2008
- No. of teams: 8
- Country: United States
- Last champion: Sioux Falls Storm
- Website: unitedindoorfootball.com

Logo used from 2005 to 2007

United Indoor Football (UIF) was an indoor American football league in the United States that operated from 2005 to 2008. Ten owners from the National Indoor Football League, including one expansion (the Dayton Warbirds, which never played a game in UIF) and two from arenafootball2 (af2) took their franchises and formed their own league. The league was based in Omaha, Nebraska.

On July 22, 2008, it was announced that the UIF would be merging with the Intense Football League for the 2009 season. The merged league is known as the newest incarnation of the Indoor Football League.

== Field ==
United Indoor Football was played exclusively indoors, in arenas usually designed for either basketball or ice hockey teams. The field was the same width (85 feet) as a standard NHL hockey rink. The field was 50 yards long with up to an 8-yard end zone. (End zones could be a lesser depth with League approval.) Depending on the stadium in which a game was being played, the end zones may be rectangular (like a basketball court) or curved (like a hockey rink). There was a heavily padded wall on each sideline, with the padding placed on top of the hockey dasher boards. The field goal uprights were 9 feet wide, and the crossbar was 18 feet above the playing surface. Unlike Arena football, the ball was not "live" when rebounded off the nets behind the end zone or their support apparatuses.

A player was counted as out of bounds on the sidelines if they came into contact or fell over the boundary wall.

== Players ==
Each team fielded eight players at a time from a 21-man active roster.

== Ball movement ==
The ball was kicked off from the goal line. The team with the ball was given four downs to gain ten yards or score. Punting was illegal because of the size of the playing field. A receiver jumping to catch a pass needed to get only one foot down in bounds for the catch to be deemed a completed catch. Balls that bounced off the padded walls that surrounded the field were live. The defending team could return missed field goal attempts that fell short of the end zone. If a free kick struck the ceiling or any object hanging from said ceiling while over the field of play, it was immediately dead and belonged to the receiving team 5 yards from mid-field.

== Scoring ==
The scoring was the same as in the NFL with the addition of a drop kick field goal worth four points during normal play or two points as a post-touchdown conversion. Blocked extra points and turnovers on two-point conversion attempts could be returned by the defensive team for two points. A rouge-kickoff downed in the end zone was worth 1 point to the kicking team; a rouge-kickoff being when the kick returner is caught in his own end zone. A free kick recovered in the end zone by the kicking team was considered a touchdown.

== Timing ==
A game consisted of four 15-minute quarters with a halftime intermission 20 minutes in length. The clock typically only stopped for time-outs, penalties, injuries, and official clarifications. Further stoppages occurred for incomplete passes and out of bounds during the final 90 seconds of the second and fourth quarters. A mandatory official's time-out, called a promotional timeout, was assessed after the first and third quarters and is 90 seconds in duration. Another mandatory official's time-out, called a warning period, was assessed with 90 seconds to play at the end of each half. The game could also be stopped for further promotional time-outs but not exceed 90 seconds per league rules.

== Overtime rules ==
Each team received one possession from the 25-yard line to try to score. If one team outscored the other on the possession, the game was over. If still tied after an overtime possession, then each team received a new possession from the 25-yard line to try to score.

== All-time UIF teams ==
- Billings Outlaws (2007–2008)
- Black Hills Red Dogs (2005)
- Bloomington Extreme (2006–2008)
- Colorado Ice (2007–2008)
- Dayton Warbirds (proposed for 2005, revoked from league before playing a down in the UIF)
- Evansville BlueCats (2005–2007)
- Fort Wayne Freedom (2005–2006)
- Lexington Horsemen (2005–2007)
- Ohio Valley Greyhounds (2005–2007)
- Omaha Beef (2005–2008)
- Peoria Rough Riders (2005–2006)
- RiverCity Rage (2007–2008)
- Rock River Raptors (2005–2007, as Tennessee Valley Raptors in 2005)
- Sioux City Bandits (2005–2008)
- Sioux Falls Storm (2005–2008)
- Tupelo FireAnts (2005)
- Wichita Wild (2008)

== Championships ==
UIF's championship was known as the United Bowl; all four United Bowls were won by the Sioux Falls Storm.

The United Football League had expressed an interest in the use of the United Bowl name after the UIF-IFL merger, but the Indoor Football League has retained the "United Bowl" trademark and uses it for the name of the United Conference championship. The UFL instead uses the name "The Championship" for its championship game.

The table's caption
| United Bowl | Location | Away team score | Home team score |
|---|---|---|---|
| I | Gateway Arena, Sioux City, Iowa | Sioux Falls Storm 40 | Sioux City Bandits 38 |
| II | Sioux Falls Arena, Sioux Falls, South Dakota | Lexington Horsemen 64 | Sioux Falls Storm 72 |
| III | Sioux Falls Arena, Sioux Falls, South Dakota | Lexington Horsemen 59 | Sioux Falls Storm 62 |
| IV | Sioux Falls Arena, Sioux Falls, South Dakota | Bloomington Extreme 35 | Sioux Falls Storm 40 |
