= Ohio Valley Greyhounds =

Logo

General information
- Founded: 1999
- Folded: 2007
- Headquartered: Wheeling, West Virginia at the WesBanco Arena
- Colors: Black, Red, Grey
- Mascot: Blitz

Personnel
- Head coach: Mark Bonar 2002–2003–2004–2005 (partial year) – Record 49–6
- President: Sharon Stephan

Team history
- Steel Valley Smash (1999–2000); Ohio Valley Greyhounds (2001–2007)

Home fields
- WesBanco Arena (1999-2007)

League / conference affiliations
- Indoor Football League 1999–2000 National Indoor Football League 2001–2004 United Indoor Football 2005–2007

Championships
- League championships: 2; 2002, 2003

Playoff appearances (5)
- 2000, 2001, 2002, 2003, 2004

The Ohio Valley Greyhounds were a professional indoor football team. They began play in 1999 as the Steel Valley Smash, a charter member of the IFL. After the league folded, they moved to the NIFL, became a charter member, and renamed themselves as the Ohio Valley Greyhounds. After four successful years in the league, they moved to the UIF in 2005 and became a charter member to the new league. However, the Greyhounds failed to reach the same level of success from the NIFL years. Their home games were played at the WesBanco Arena in Wheeling, West Virginia, which is also the home to the ECHL's Wheeling Nailers. After three dismal years in the UIF, the team folded in October 2007.

== Season-by-season ==
Season records
Season	W	L	T	Finish	Playoff results
Steel Valley Smash (IFL)
1999	2	10	0	4th Southern	--
2000	9	5	0	1st EC Southern	Won Quarterfinal (Green Bay); Lost Semifinal (Peoria)
Ohio Valley Greyhounds (NIFL)
2001	11	3	0	1st Atlantic Eastern	Won Round 1 (Lake Charles); Lost Semifinal (Mississippi)
2002	12	1	0	1st Atlantic Northern	Won Round 1 (L. Rangers); Win Semifinal (T. ThunderCats); Won Indoor Bowl II (Billings)
2003	14	0	0	1st Atlantic Eastern	Won Round 1 (Lexington); Won Semifinal (Lake Charles); Won Indoor Bowl III (Utah)
2004	11	3	0	1st Atlantic East	Won AC Semifinal (Fort Wayne); Lost AC Championship (Lexington)
Ohio Valley Greyhounds (UIF)
2005	6	9	0	2nd Midwest	Lost Round 1 (Sioux City)
2006	6	9	0	3rd East	--
2007	2	13	0	6th East	--
Totals	73	53	0	(including playoffs)	
