= Jeff Luc =

American gridiron football player (born 1992)

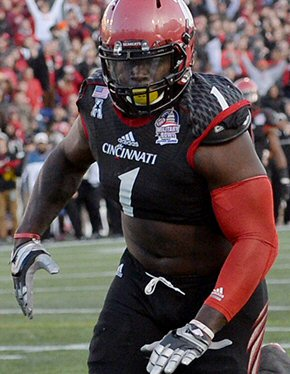
- Luc in the 2014 Military Bowl

No. 1 – Pueblo Punishers
- Position: Offensive Lineman
- Roster status: Active

Personal information
- Born: February 14, 1992 (age 34); Miami, Florida, U.S.
- Listed height: 6 ft 1 in (1.85 m)
- Listed weight: 263 lb (119 kg)

Career information
- High school: Port St. Lucie (FL) Treasure Coast
- College: Cincinnati
- NFL draft: 2015: undrafted

Career history
- Miami Dolphins (2015)*; New Orleans Saints (2015)*; Cincinnati Bengals (2016)*; New York Jets (2017)*; Calgary Stampeders (2017)*; Toronto Argonauts (2017–2018)*; Atlanta Legends (2019); Billings Outlaws (2022); Colorado Spartans (2024); Omaha Beef (2024); Shreveport Rouxgaroux (2025); Columbus Lions (2025); Pueblo Punishers (2026-present)
- * Offseason or practice squad member only
- Stats at Pro Football Reference
- Stats at CFL.ca

Jeff Luc (born February 14, 1992) is an American football linebacker who currently plays for the Pueblo Punishers of the National Arena League (NAL). He previously attended Florida State University. In June 2012, Luc transferred to play at Cincinnati. Luc was a 2009 USA Today High School All-American selection.

Originally from Miami, Florida, Luc moved to Port St. Lucie in 2003, where he attended Treasure Coast High School. He registered 103 tackles (14 for a loss) as a senior, and played in the Under Armour All-America Game. Regarded as a four-star recruit by Rivals.com, Luc was listed as the No. 1 inside linebacker prospect in the class of 2010.

== Professional career ==
=== Miami Dolphins ===
On May 2, 2015, Luc signed as an undrafted free agent with the Dolphins. He was released by the team on September 4, 2015.

=== New Orleans Saints ===
On December 29, 2015, Luc was signed to the Saints' practice squad.

=== Cincinnati Bengals ===
On January 11, 2016, Luc signed a reserve/future contract with the Bengals. He was released by the team on September 3, 2016.

=== New York Jets ===
On January 18, 2017, Luc signed a reserve/future contract with the Jets. On April 26, 2017, Luc was waived by the Jets.

=== Calgary Stampeders ===
On May 22, 2017, Luc signed with the Calgary Stampeders of the Canadian Football League. He was later released by the Stampeders on June 17, 2017.

=== Toronto Argonauts ===
On September 20, 2017, Luc signed with the Toronto Argonauts of the Canadian Football League. Luc never played a game in the CFL, and was released after the 2018 preseason.

=== Atlanta Legends ===
In 2019, Luc joined the Atlanta Legends of the Alliance of American Football. He made his professional debut with Atlanta, having never appeared in a regular season game in the NFL or CFL; in the eight games played prior to the league suspending operations and filing for bankruptcy in April 2019, he made 32 tackles, 3.5 sacks, and forced a fumble.

=== Colorado Spartans ===
On October 18, 2023, Luc would come out of retirement to sign with the Colorado Spartans of the National Arena League (NAL).
