= Daron Clark =

American football player (born 1985)

Profile
- Position: Wide receiver

Personal information
- Born: September 21, 1985 (age 41); Atlanta, Georgia, U.S.
- Listed height: 5 ft 7 in (1.70 m)
- Listed weight: 165 lb (75 kg)

Career information
- High school: Atlanta (GA) Washington
- College: Stillman College
- NFL draft: 2007: undrafted

Career history

Playing
- New York Sentinels (2009); Montreal Alouettes (2010)*; Orlando Predators (2011)*; Colorado Ice (2011); San Antonio Talons (2012)*; Bloomington Edge (2012–2013); Spokane Shock (2012); Colorado Ice (2013); Cleveland Gladiators (2014)*; Green Bay Blizzard (2014); Richmond Raiders (2014); Iowa Barnstormers (2015); Richmond Raiders (2015); Bloomington Edge (2016); High Country Grizzlies (2017); Quad City Steamwheelers (2018–2020); Duke City Gladiators (2019); Northern Arizona Wranglers (2021); Orlando Predators (2022); Tulsa Oilers (2023)*
- * Offseason or practice squad member only

Coaching
- Cedar Rapids River Kings (2024) Head coach

Operations
- Cedar Rapids River Kings (2024) General manager

Career AFL statistics
- Receptions: 1
- Receiving yards: 3
- Receiving TDs: 0
- Kick Return: 1
- Kick Return yards: 47
- Stats at ArenaFan.com

Daron Clark (born September 21, 1985) is an American former football wide receiver. He played college football at Stillman College. Clark has played for the Spokane Shock. He was released by the Green Bay Blizzard on April 17, 2014. Clark signed on May 1, 2014 with the Richmond Raiders of the Professional Indoor Football League (PIFL). On October 20, 2015, Clark signed with the Bloomington Edge. Clark signed with the High Country Grizzlies for the 2017 season. On October 9, 2017, Clark signed with the Quad City Steamwheelers.

On October 10, 2020, Clark signed with the Northern Arizona Wranglers of the Indoor Football League (IFL) for the team's inaugural 2021 season. On December 5, 2021, Clark was released by the Wranglers.

On November 26, 2021, Clark signed with the Orlando Predators of the National Arena League.

On November 29, 2022, Clark signed with the Tulsa Oilers of the Indoor Football League (IFL). On February 24, 2023, Clark was released by the Oilers.

On August 4, 2023, Clark signed to be the head coach for the Cedar Rapids River Kings of American Indoor Football (AIF).

== Head coaching record ==
| League | Team | Year | Regular season | | | | Postseason | | | |
| League | Team | Year | Won | Lost | Win % | Finish | Won | Lost | Win % | Result |
|---|---|---|---|---|---|---|---|---|---|---|
| AIF | Cedar Rapids River Kings | 2024 | 2 | 3 | .400 | | 0 | 0 | – | |
| AIF total | | | 0 | 2 | .000 | | 0 | 0 | – | |
| Career total | | | 2 | 3 | .400 | | 0 | 0 | – | |
