= Bryan Gates =

American basketball coach

Philadelphia 76ers
- Position: Assistant coach
- League: NBA

Personal information
- Born: Anchorage, Alaska, U.S.

Career information
- College: Boise State
- Coaching career: 1997–present

Career history

Coaching
- 1997–2001: Idaho Stampede (assistant)
- 2001–2004: Oklahoma Storm
- 2004: Florence Flyers
- 2004–2005: Beirut Blue Stars
- 2005–2006: Austin Toros (assistant)
- 2006–2009: Idaho Stampede
- 2009–2010: Sacramento Kings (assistant)
- 2010–2015: New Orleans Pelicans (assistant)
- 2015–2016: Minnesota Timberwolves (assistant)
- 2016–2019: Sacramento Kings (assistant)
- 2019–2021: Minnesota Timberwolves (assistant)
- 2021–2023: Phoenix Suns (assistant)
- 2023–present: Philadelphia 76ers (assistant)

Career highlights
- USBL Coach of the Year (2006); 2× NBA G League Coach of the Year (2007, 2008); NBA D League champion (2008)

Bryan Gates is an American professional basketball coach. He has been an assistant coach for the Philadelphia 76ers since 2023. Gates began his coaching experience with the Idaho Stampede and the Rapid City Thrillers during the late 1990s. In the United States Basketball League, Gates was the head coach for the Oklahoma Storm and the Florence Flyers during the 2000s. During this time period, Gates and the Storm reach the league's championship game during 2000.

In 2005, Gates went to the NBA D-League and became an assistant coach for the Austin Toros. With the Stampede from 2006 to 2009, his team won the 2007-08 D League Championship. He also won the NBA G League Coach of the Year Award twice and coached during the 2008 NBA Development League All-Star Game. During 2009, he began his assistant coaching career in the National Basketball Association. Some teams he has worked with include the Sacramento Kings and the New Orleans Pelicans.

== Early life, family and education ==
Gates spent his childhood in Anchorage, Alaska. He served as a ball boy during Great Alaska Shootout tournaments.

He graduated from Boise State University.

== Career ==
Gates declined a job in technology to work in basketball.

=== Late 1990s to early 2000s ===
In 1997, Gates began his career as an intern with the Idaho Stampede in basketball operations. While part of the Continental Basketball Association team, Gates continued his intern position when he became an account executive that year. He later became an assistant coach with Idaho at the end of 1997. As a member of the International Basketball Association in 1998, Gates joined the Rapid City Thrillers in assistant positions as a general manager and coach. In 1999, Gates became a director of player personnel for the Stampede. While in his director position until 2001, Gates continued his assistant coaching experience with Idaho to 2003.

When the Oklahoma Storm held their first ever game in 2000, Gates was one of their head coaches for the United States Basketball League team alongside Denny Price. In the USBL, Gates and the Storm were defeated by Dodge City during the league's championship game in 2000. After Price died in 2000, Gates became the sole coach of the Storm for the following season. With the Storm in 2001, Gates and his team reached the postseason's first round.

During this time period, Gates coached the Global Sports basketball team in exhibition games while with the Storm. In 2003, Gates coached the Hickory Nutz as part of the Carolinas Basketball League. That season, Gates was the CBL Coach of the Year and won the league championship with the Nutz. He also worked as an assistant coach for the Gary Steelheads.

=== Mid to late 2000s ===
When the Florence Flyers became an USBL team, Gates was chosen as their head coach in February 2004. With the Flyers, Gates also worked as their general manager before becoming a temporary owner of the team. Gates was released from his coaching position in May 2004. With the Flyers, Gates had 9 wins and 20 losses.

In 2005, Gates resumed his tenure with the Storm when he became their head coach and general manager. The following year, Gates continued to work with the Storm as their head coach. Gates was selected as the Coach of the Year for the USBL in 2006. As a USBL coach with the Storm between 2000 and 2006, Gates had 74 wins and 46 losses.

For the NBA D-League, Gates became an assistant coach for the Austin Toros in 2005. The following year, he became head coach of the Idaho Stampede in 2006 and led his team to win the 2007-08 D League Championship. In 2008, Gates was chosen as one of the coaches for the NBA Development League All-Star Game. After leaving the Stampede in 2009, Gates had 100 wins and 50 losses as a D-League coach.

=== Late 2000s to 2020s ===
In 2009, Gates went to the National Basketball Association and became an assistant coach for multiple teams. He started with the Sacramento Kings in 2009. He then worked with the New Orleans Pelicans from 2010 to 2015 and the Minnesota Timberwolves from 2015 to 2016. In 2016, Gates returned to the Sacramento Kings until he rejoined the Timberwolves in 2019. Gates continued his assistant coaching career with the Phoenix Suns in 2021.

While with the Suns, he was one of the coaches during the 2022 Rising Stars Challenge. In 2023, Gates was scheduled to work with the Dallas Mavericks before he became an assistant coach for the Philadelphia 76ers that year. Outside of the United States, Gates coached the Beirut Blue Stars of the Lebanese Basketball League from 2004 to 2005. He was hired by the Canada men's national basketball team for the 2015 Pan American Games.

== Awards ==
Gates has been named the NBA G League Coach of the Year twice, in 2007 and 2008.

== Personal life ==
Gates is married with three children who are triplets.
