= Eric Thomas (wide receiver) =

American gridiron football player (born 1991)

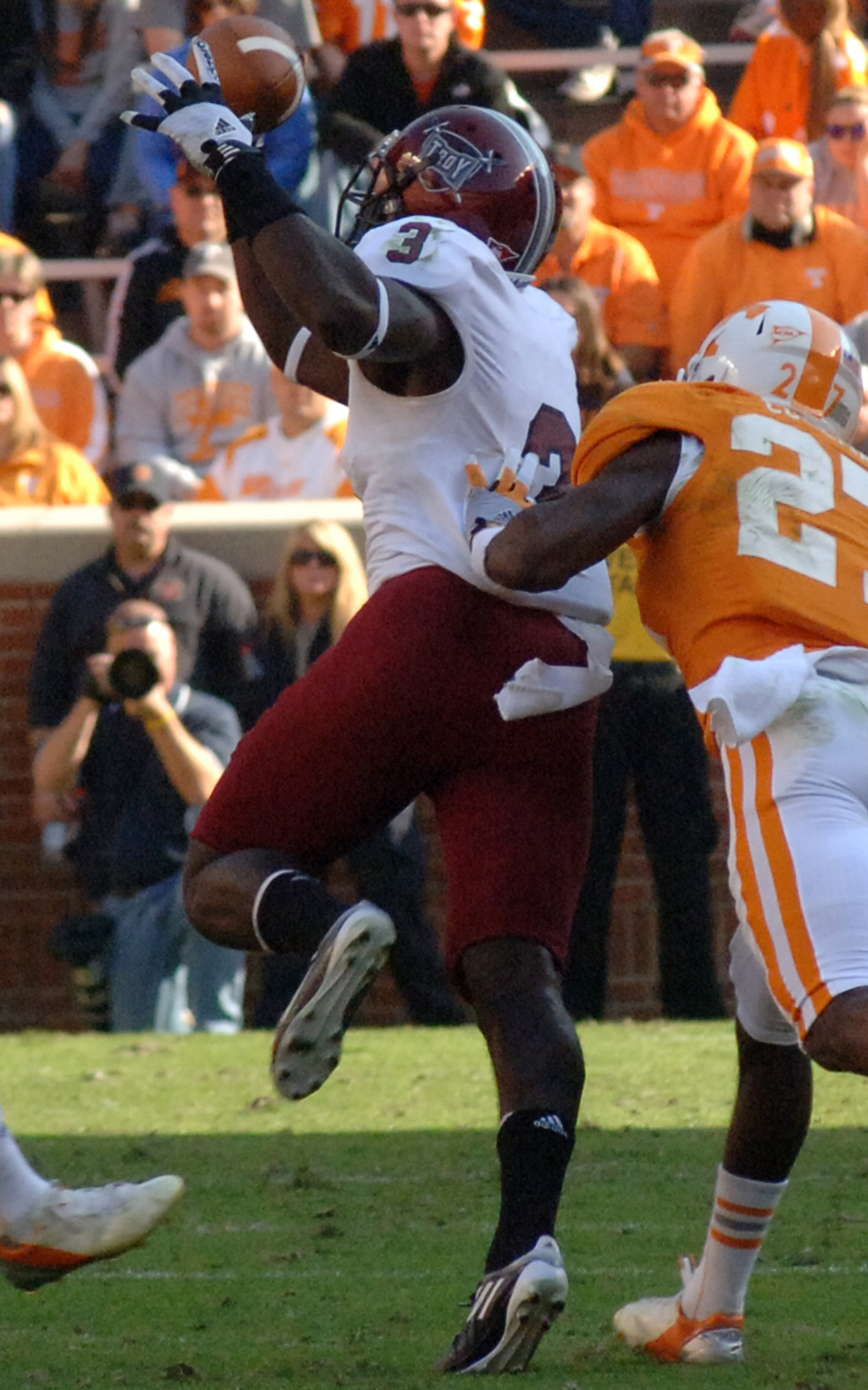
- Thomas with Troy in 2012

Shreveport Rouxgaroux
- Positions: Wide receiver, return specialist
- Roster status: Active

Personal information
- Born: November 11, 1991 (age 34); Shreveport, Louisiana, U.S.
- Listed height: 6 ft 1 in (1.85 m)
- Listed weight: 210 lb (95 kg)

Career information
- High school: Evangel Christian Academy (Shreveport, Louisiana)
- College: Troy
- NFL draft: 2014: undrafted

Career history
- Indianapolis Colts (2014)*; Buffalo Bills (2014)*; Saskatchewan Roughriders (2015)*; Cedar Rapids Titans (2016); Nebraska Danger (2016–2019); Green Bay Blizzard (2020–2021); Iowa Barnstormers (2022); Shreveport Rouxgaroux (2025–present)
- * Offseason or practice squad member only

Awards and highlights
- Second Team All-IFL, Offense (2018); First-team All-Sun Belt (2013); Second-team All-Sun Belt (2011); 2010 New Orleans Bowl champion
- Stats at Pro Football Reference

Eric L. Thomas Jr. (born November 11, 1991) is an American football wide receiver and return specialist for the Shreveport Rouxgaroux of the National Arena League. Prior to his arena football career, Thomas played in both the National Football League and the Canadian Football League.

== College career ==
Thomas played for the Troy Trojans football team from 2010 to 2013. During those years, the Trojans won the 2010 New Orleans Bowl, and Thomas amassed 2,655 yards on 197 catches; he was only 7 yards shy of a 1,000 yard season in 2013. Furthermore, Thomas became the Sun Belt Conference leader in receiving touchdowns, with 29 during his career. While playing at Troy, Thomas majored in criminal justice.

=== College statistics ===
| | | | Receiving | | | |
| Year | Team | GP | Rec | Yds | Avg | TD |
|---|---|---|---|---|---|---|
| 2010 | Troy | 10 | 9 | 120 | 13.3 | 1 |
| 2011 | Troy | 12 | 67 | 875 | 13.1 | 9 |
| 2012 | Troy | 12 | 55 | 667 | 12.1 | 7 |
| 2013 | Troy | 12 | 66 | 993 | 15.0 | 12 |
| | | 46 | 197 | 2,655 | 13.5 | 29 |

== Professional career ==
As the all time Sun Belt Conference leader in receiving touchdowns, Thomas received interest by NFL teams, and was even brought in for a pre-draft visit by the Indianapolis Colts. However, Thomas was not selected in the 2014 NFL draft.

=== NFL ===
Despite going undrafted, the Colts signed Thomas as a priority free agent, including a signing bonus of $6,000. Thomas played in 3 preseason games, catching 2 passes for 18 yards before his release. Thomas was signed to the Colts practice roster later in the year, where he spent two weeks. Thomas was also signed to the Buffalo Bills practice squad in 2014, but was cut after a week in favor of Tobais Palmer.

=== CFL ===
Thomas next played for the Saskatchewan Roughriders of the Canadian Football League, signing on for the 2015 season. However, after catching only one pass for 7 yards in the two preseason games, Thomas was released.

=== IFL ===
Thomas joined the Cedar Rapids Titans of the Indoor Football League. He spent the first part of 2016 playing with Cedar Rapids and adapting to the rules of arena football, but was released during the season. After his release, Thomas was picked up by the Titans rival, the Nebraska Danger partway through the 2016 season. Thomas's first season in Nebraska saw him play in only 5 regular season games, but was effective in two postseason games, catching 4 touchdowns. The following year, Thomas had increased usage, surpassing 400 yards on the year. Thomas had a breakout year in 2018; he recorded his first 100-yard game in week 3, and was named one of the players of the week after catching 3 touchdowns to help defeat the eventual champion Iowa Barnstormers in week 6. On special teams, Thomas was named player of the week following a week 4 victory after contributing a recovered onside kick into a touchdown return. By the end of the 2018 season, Thomas was named to the 2nd team All IFL Offense. Thomas recorded his second 100-yard receiving game in 2019, and saw an increased usage on special teams; Thomas took over long snapping duties, and a returner he was named special teams player of the week of week 10 in 2019, for two return touchdowns. Thomas led the league in combined return touchdowns for 2019 with 3, and scored his 50th career touchdown on a rush in the regular season finale against the Barnstormers, a victory which sent Thomas and the Danger to the playoffs for the 4th consecutive year. In the playoffs, Thomas caught the lone touchdown pass from quarterback Tommy Armstrong in the first game, an upset of the higher seeded Green Bay Blizzard, but was disqualified for unsportsmanlike conduct late in the second game, a loss to the Arizona Rattlers in which Thomas recorded 5 catches, four of which were touchdowns as well as a two-point conversion catch.

==== Green Bay Blizzard ====
Following the 2019 season, the Nebraska Danger were put up for sale by their owners, Bosselman Enterprises. Unable to find a buyer in time to qualify for the 2020 IFL season, players became free agents and needed to find new teams. In November 2019, Thomas signed with the Green Bay Blizzard. Hoping to build on a winning 2019 season and their first playoff berth since 2012, Thomas and the Blizzard were denied a chance to play due to the COVID-19 pandemic causing the 2020 IFL season being cancelled. Thomas did play for the team in 2021, scoring a combined 11 touchdowns through 6 games. However, following a cancelled game with the Louisville Xtreme, who were subsequently voted out of the league for failing to pay players, Thomas was not brought back to the 4-4 team following the impromptu bye week, during which additional players from Louisville were added to the roster. While Thomas remained a free agent for the rest of the season, the Blizzard finished the year by winning only one game out of six, with an overall record of 5-9. It was the first year where a team Thomas played for missed the IFL playoffs.

==== Iowa Barnstormers ====
During IFL free agency, Thomas signed with the Iowa Barnstormers for the 2022 season. Ironically, Iowa was the last team Thomas played against as a member of the Blizzard. Thomas played in 4 games, but suffered an injury and was placed on the reserve list through the season.

=== NAL ===
On August 17, 2024, it was announced that Thomas had signed with his hometown team, the Shreveport Rouxgaroux of the National Arena League. Despite a strong start to the year, Thomas suffered a torn Achilles tendon injury and missed most of the 2025 season.

== Professional statistics ==
=== IFL regular season ===
| | | | Receiving | | | | Rushing | | | Kick return | | | Missed FG return | | |
| Year | Team | G | Rec | Yds | Avg | TD | Att | Yds | TD | Ret | Yds | TD | Ret | Yds | TD |
|---|---|---|---|---|---|---|---|---|---|---|---|---|---|---|---|
| 2016 | CRT | 7 | 9 | 78 | 8.7 | 2 | 3 | 8 | 1 | 0 | 0 | 0 | 0 | 0 | 0 |
| 2016 | NEB | 5 | 12 | 124 | 10.3 | 1 | 1 | 2 | 0 | 0 | 0 | 0 | 0 | 0 | 0 |
| 2017 | NEB | 16 | 37 | 419 | 11.3 | 8 | 8 | 106 | 3 | 24 | 329 | 1 | 0 | 0 | 0 |
| 2018 | NEB | 12 | 56 | 658 | 11.8 | 16 | 3 | 21 | 1 | 11 | 138 | 1 | 0 | 0 | 0 |
| 2019 | NEB | 14 | 40 | 449 | 11.2 | 11 | 10 | 77 | 2 | 24 | 526 | 2 | 1 | 58 | 1 |
| 2020 | GB | Season cancelled | | | | | | | | | | | | | |
| 2021 | GB | 7 | 16 | 201 | 12.6 | 9 | 3 | 2 | 1 | 3 | 80 | 1 | 0 | 0 | 0 |
| 2022 | IB | 4 | 11 | 128 | 11.6 | 1 | 4 | 16 | 2 | 3 | 81 | 0 | 0 | 0 | 0 |
| Totals: | | 65 | 183 | 2,057 | 11.2 | 48 | 32 | 232 | 10 | 65 | 1,154 | 5 | 1 | 58 | 1 |

=== IFL playoffs ===
| | | | Receiving | | | | Rushing | | | Kick return | | | Missed FG return | | |
| Year | Team | G | Rec | Yds | Avg | TD | Att | Yds | TD | Ret | Yds | TD | Ret | Yds | TD |
|---|---|---|---|---|---|---|---|---|---|---|---|---|---|---|---|
| 2016 | NEB | 2 | 7 | 71 | 10.1 | 4 | 0 | 0 | 0 | 0 | 0 | 0 | 0 | 0 | 0 |
| 2017 | NEB | 1 | 3 | 33 | 11.0 | 0 | 0 | 0 | 0 | 2 | 54 | 1 | 0 | 0 | 0 |
| 2018 | NEB | 1 | 1 | 12 | 12.0 | 0 | 0 | 0 | 0 | 0 | 0 | 0 | 0 | 0 | 0 |
| 2019 | NEB | 2 | 8 | 58 | 7.3 | 5 | 2 | 8 | 0 | 3 | 99 | 0 | 0 | 0 | 0 |
| Totals: | | 6 | 19 | 174 | 9.2 | 9 | 2 | 8 | 0 | 5 | 153 | 1 | 0 | 0 | 0 |
