= CenturyLink Center =

CenturyLink Center may refer to:

- CenturyLink Center Omaha, an arena in Omaha, Nebraska now known as CHI Health Center Omaha
- CenturyLink Center (Bossier City), arena located in Bossier City, Louisiana
