= Stride Bank Center =

Multi-purpose arena in Enid, Oklahoma

Coordinates: 36°23′40″N 97°52′44″W

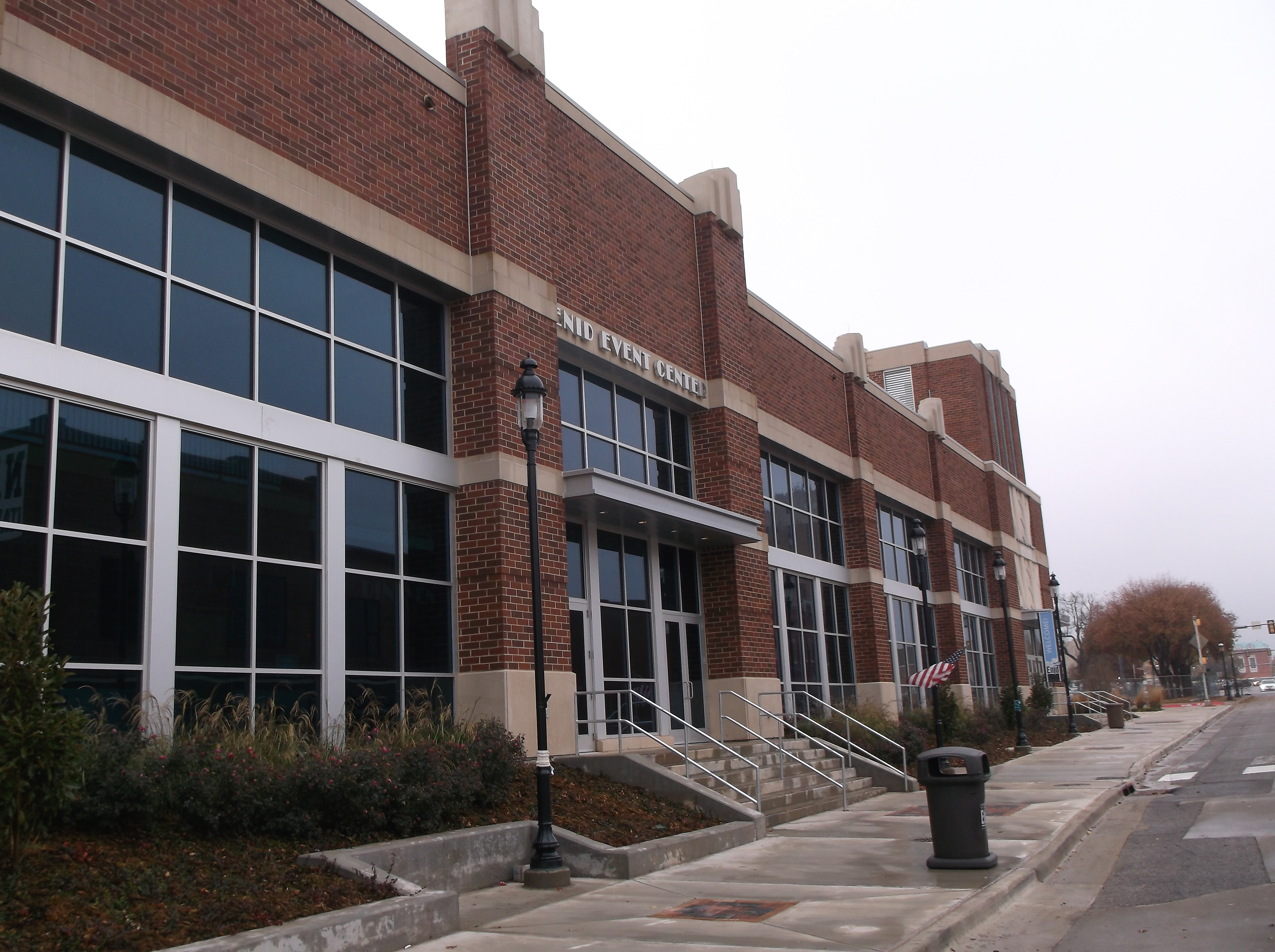
- Interactive map of Stride Bank Center
- Former names: Enid Renaissance Event Center (planning/construction); Enid Event Center (2013–16); Central National Bank Center (2016–19)
- Address: 301 S Independence St; Enid, OK 73701-5626
- Owner: City of Enid
- Operator: Spectra by Comcast
- Capacity: 3,887

Construction
- Groundbreaking: May 20, 2011
- Opened: June 15, 2013
- Cost: $18.6 million ($26.7 million in 2025 dollars)
- Architects: Convergence Design; Architects in Partnership
- Project managers: Carter & Associates
- Structural engineer: Henderson Engineers
- General contractor: Key Construction
- Main contractor: McNatt Construction

Tenants
- Enid Plainsmen (2013–present); Enid Pacers (2013–present); Oklahoma Flying Aces (CIF) (2019); Enid Outlaws (TBL) (2021–present)

Website
- Venue Website

The Stride Bank Center is an arena in downtown Enid, Oklahoma.

== History ==
Construction on the Stride Bank Center began in May 2011. The building was designed by Convergence Design and constructed by Key Construction as part of the Enid Renaissance project, a $24 million project which included the renovation of Convention Hall and the addition of 1,100 additional parking spaces in the downtown area. The former Geronimo Motor Company building was torn down for parking accommodations. It opened on June 15, 2013 with the Greater Enid Chamber of Commerce Business Expo. Stride Bank Center was previously named the Enid Event Center & Convention Hall (June 15, 2013 – June 13, 2016), and Central National Bank Center (June 14, 2016 – March 21, 2019). It was renamed the Stride Bank Center on March 22, 2019.

Mark Price Arena
- Convention Hall
- Interactive map of Mark Price Arena
- Location: Enid, Oklahoma, United States
- Owner: City of Enid, Oklahoma
- Capacity: 2,500

Construction
- Closed: 2009

Tenant
- Oklahoma Storm (USBL)

=== Convention Hall ===
In 1919, Milton C. Garber, then mayor of Enid, and his commissioner aides, G. W. Pancoast and Jason W. Butts, proposed a bond issue for the construction of a building to memorialize the efforts of Garfield County soldiers in World War I. Sealed bids were accepted until September 1, 1919 on bonds of $250,000 for the construction of the convention hall. The building was constructed at a cost of $500,000 with an original capacity of 5,000. It was designed by the architectural firm Layton, Smith and Forsyth and constructed by Bass and Frankenfield Builders. It served as a meeting place for the Enid Chamber of Commerce. The hall served as a venue for stage productions including plays such as Hitchy-Koo and Al G. Field minstrel shows and for musicians such as John Philip Sousa, Ernestine Schumann-Heink, Bob Wills, and Fred Waring. President George Bush spoke at the venue while campaigning in 1992.

The original hall was four stories tall, and had two balconies: the first of which holds 995 people and the second 667 people. The floor measures at 109 feet (33 m) long by 67 feet (20 m) wide, and can hold 600 people. The ceiling is 40 feet (12 m) high, and the stage measures at 37 feet (11 m) wide and nearly 30 feet (9.1 m) long.

=== Mark Price Arena ===
The Mark Price Arena was a 2,500-seat multi-purpose arena in Enid, Oklahoma located in Convention Hall, named in 1993 after basketball player Mark Price who played for Georgia Tech and the Cleveland Cavaliers. In addition to hosting concerts and high school sports, the arena was home to the Oklahoma Storm, a basketball team in the USBL. The Skeltur Conference Tournament was held at the arena from 1964 to 2012.

=== Renovations ===
In May 2011, city officials attended a groundbreaking to begin the Enid Renaissance Project which would renovate Convention Hall. W. L. McNatt and Company, of Oklahoma City was awarded a $7,082,000 renovation contract to update the building. The project added a 11,000 sq ft ballroom, a 3,000 sq ft ballroom and 5,500 sq ft of meeting areas. The renovated location is the home of the Stride Bank Center, previously named the Enid Event Center and Central National Bank Center. Convention Hall underwent renovations and reopened on November 18, 2012 as part of Veteran's Day festivities.

== Gallery ==
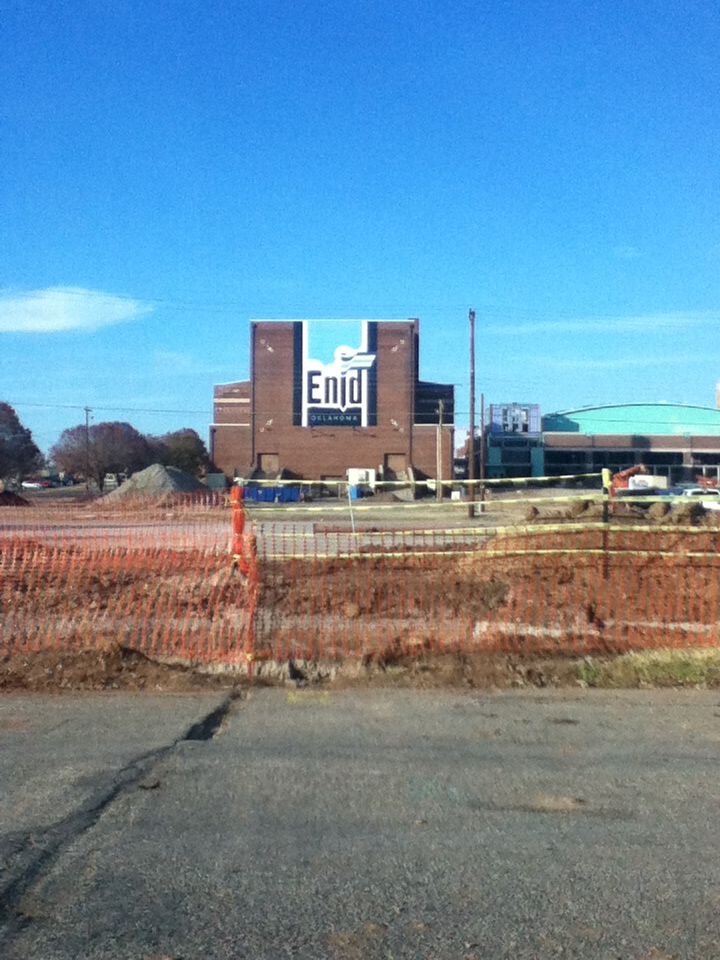
Convention Hall during the construction of the Stride Bank Center

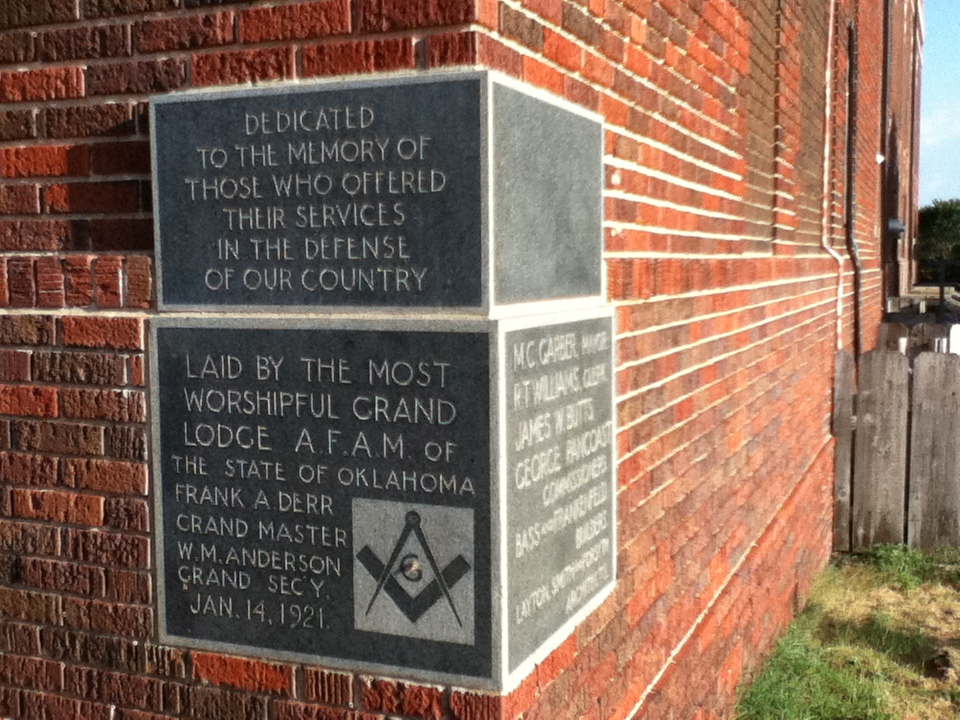
Cornerstone reads "Dedicated to the memory of those who offered their services in the defense of this country."

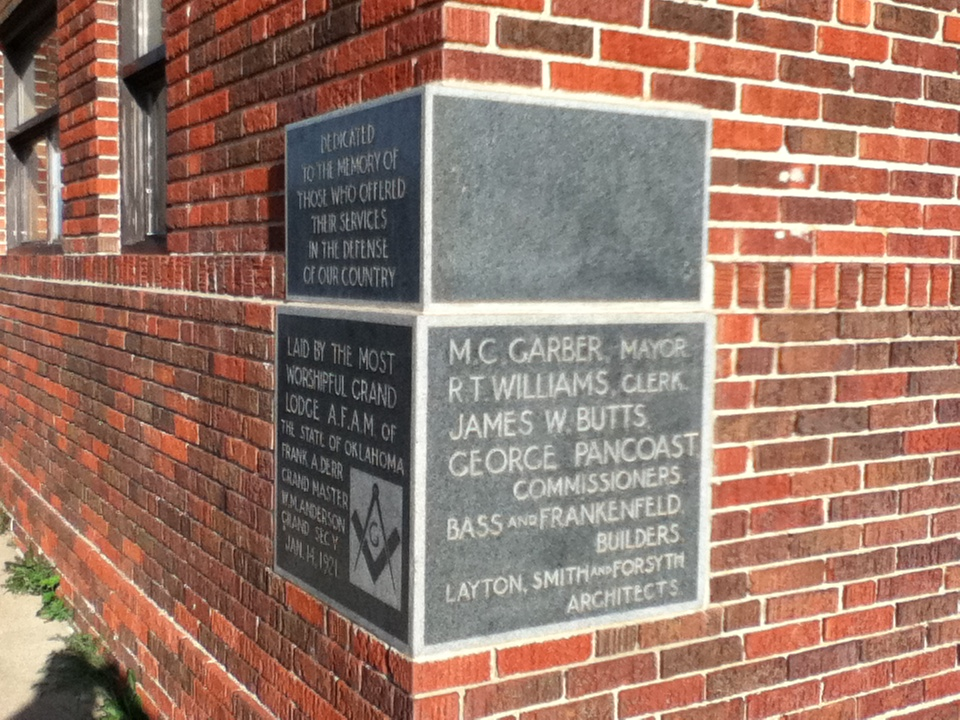
Cornerstone of Convention Hall includes then mayor M.C. Garber's name, and the architectural firm Layton, Smith and Forsyth who designed the building.

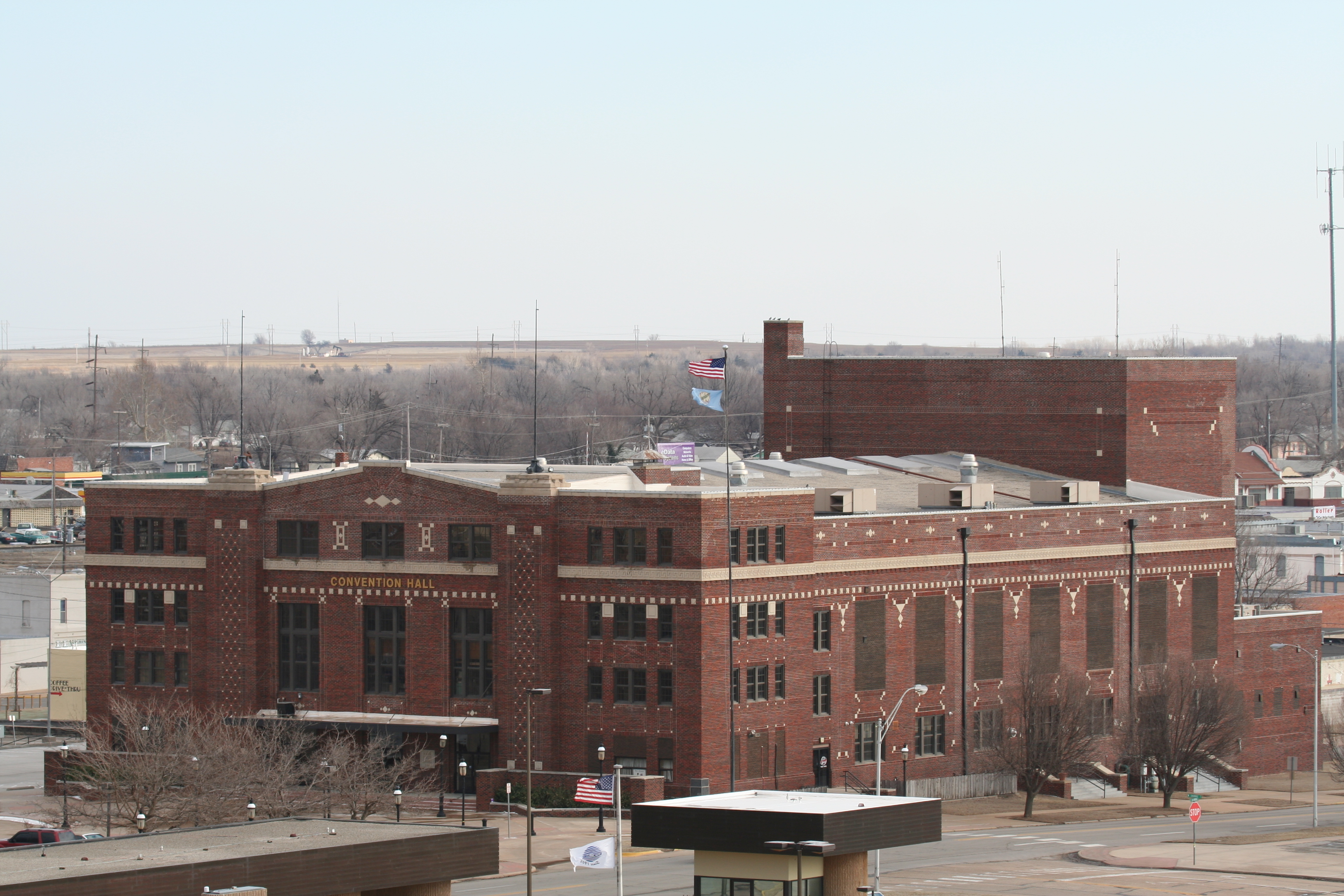
Outdoor view of Convention Hall, home of the Mark Price Arena.

== Notable performers ==
- Alabama
- Alan Jackson
- Amy Grant
- The Beach Boys
- Celtic Thunder
- Darius Rucker
- Gabriel Iglesias
- Gary Allan
- Goo Goo Dolls
- Justin Moore
- Kenny Rogers
- Lee Brice
- Little Big Town
- Lonestar
- Martina McBride
- MercyMe
- Night Ranger
- Pat Benatar
- Reba McEntire
- Rodney Atkins
- Ronnie Milsap
- Styx
- Vince Gill
- "Weird Al" Yankovic
- Willie Nelson
- 3 Doors Down
