= Darius Prince =

American football player (born 1990)

Kentucky Barrels
- Position: Wide receiver
- Roster status: Active

Personal information
- Born: April 23, 1990 (age 36); McKeesport, Pennsylvania, U.S.
- Listed height: 6 ft 1 in (1.85 m)
- Listed weight: 185 lb (84 kg)

Career information
- High school: West Mifflin Area (West Mifflin, Pennsylvania)
- College: Penn State Beaver (basketball)
- NFL draft: 2013: undrafted

Career history
- Erie Explosion (2014); Lehigh Valley Steelhawks (2016–2017); Philadelphia Soul (2017–2018); Philadelphia Eagles (2018)*; San Antonio Commanders (2019); Philadelphia Soul (2019); New York Guardians (2020)*; Albany Empire (2021–2023); Orlando Predators (2023); Albany Firebirds (2024); Corpus Christi Tritons (2025); Billings Outlaws (2025); Kentucky Barrels (2026–present)
- * Offseason or practice squad member only

Awards and highlights
- ArenaBowl champion (2017); ArenaBowl MVP (2017); First-team All-NAL (2017); First-team All-Arena (2025)
- Stats at ArenaFan.com

Darius Prince (born April 23, 1990) is an American football wide receiver for the Kentucky Barrels of Arena Football One (AF1). Before joining the San Antonio Commanders of the Alliance of American Football (AAF) in 2019, he played on various indoor football teams including the Lehigh Valley Steelhawks from 2016 to 2017 and the Soul from 2017 to 2018. Prince received 1st Team All-NAL team honors with the Steelhawks and the ArenaBowl MVP Award with the Soul during ArenaBowl XXX in 2017. He also won championships with the Albany Empire (2022–2023) and was a runner-up for the ArenaBowl in 2024 with the Albany Firebirds and has also played for the Corpus Christi Tritons and Billings Outlaws.

== Early life and education ==
Prince was born on April 23, 1990. During his childhood, he focused on basketball while living with his siblings in McKeesport, Pennsylvania. For his post-secondary education, Prince was on basketball teams for Penn State Greater Allegheny and Penn State Beaver.

== Career ==
After graduation, Prince switched to football when he could not find a representative to start his basketball career. Prince started his football career when he briefly played with the Erie Explosion in 2014 and took up semi-professional football in Pittsburgh from 2014 to 2016. In 2016, Prince signed with the Lehigh Valley Steelhawks for the National Arena League. As a member of the Steelhawks from 2016 to 2017, Prince had 20 touchdowns for a total of 718 yards and was named on the 1st Team All-NAL team during the 2017 National Arena League season.

In 2017, Prince switched to the Arena Football League to play for the Philadelphia Soul. His first games with the Soul was during the 2017 Arena Football League season playoffs. During the two playoff games, Prince totaled 103 receiving yards and received the ArenaBowl MVP Award after his team won ArenaBowl XXX. The following season, Prince had 1,076 receiving yards for 24 touchdowns during the 2018 Arena Football League season.

In August 2018, Prince went to the National Football League to play with the Philadelphia Eagles. During his two preseason games with the Eagles, he scored 3 touchdowns for 103 receiving yards before he was cut from the team in September 2018. In 2019, Prince left the AFL to join the Alliance of American Football with the San Antonio Commanders. He was waived on March 18, 2019. He was added back to the Commanders' rights list and signed to a contract on March 20, and activated to the roster on March 21.

After the AAF suspended football operations, Prince re-signed with the Philadelphia Soul on April 13, 2019. The AFL suspended operations on November 27, 2019.

Prince signed with the New York Guardians of the XFL on January 8, 2020. He was waived during final roster cuts on January 22, 2020.

On April 29, 2021, Prince signed with the Albany Empire of the National Arena League (NAL). On January 14, 2022, Prince re-signed with the Empire for the 2022 NAL season. On October 7, 2022, Prince re-signed with the Empire for the 2023 NAL season. On May 8, 2023 he signed with the Orlando Predators. After beginning the 2025 season with the Corpus Christi Tritons, on April 27, 2025, Prince posted a cryptic photo on his Facebook page indicating that he had left the team, which AF1 confirmed along with the departures of nine other Tritons players two days later as part of an ongoing investigation into the Tritons' business practices. On May 1, Prince signed, along with three of the other former Tritons, with the Billings Outlaws.

Prince signed with the AF1 expansion team Kentucky Barrels in September 2025, reuniting him with his former Outlaws coach Cedric Walker.
