= Brent Price =

American basketball player (born 1968)

Personal information
- Born: December 9, 1968 (age 57) Shawnee, Oklahoma, U.S.
- Listed height: 6 ft 1 in (1.85 m)
- Listed weight: 165 lb (75 kg)

Career information
- High school: Enid (Enid, Oklahoma)
- College: South Carolina (1987–1989); Oklahoma (1990–1992)
- NBA draft: 1992: 2nd round, 32nd overall pick
- Drafted by: Washington Bullets
- Playing career: 1992–2004
- Position: Point guard
- Number: 20, 25

Career history
- 1992–1996: Washington Bullets
- 1996–1999: Houston Rockets
- 1999–2001: Vancouver Grizzlies
- 2001–2002: Sacramento Kings
- 2004: Oklahoma Storm

Career highlights
- First-team All-Big Eight (1992)

Career NBA statistics
- Points: 2,481 (5.9 ppg)
- Assists: 1,236 (3.9 apg)
- 3P%: .387
- Stats at NBA.com
- Stats at Basketball Reference

Hartley Brent Price (born December 9, 1968) is an American former professional basketball player who played for four teams in the National Basketball Association (NBA). He is the brother of 4-time NBA All-Star, Mark Price.

== Early years ==
Price was born in Shawnee, Oklahoma. His father, Denny served as head coach of the Shawnee High School Wolves. Denny Price was an assistant coach under John MacLeod for the Oklahoma Sooners men's basketball team and then moved to the Phoenix Suns in 1974 also as an assistant coach. After coaching at Sam Houston State, Denny opened up a private business in Enid, Oklahoma in 1979, where his sons Brent and Mark played high school ball at Enid High School.

== College career ==
Brent played college basketball at South Carolina for 2 years and later on transferred to Oklahoma for his junior and senior years.

== Professional career ==
Price was drafted in the second round with the 32nd overall pick in the 1992 NBA draft by the Washington Bullets. He played for the Bullets for 3 years and averaged 6.9 points per game and had a 43.6% field goal percentage. On April 19, 1995, he was waived by the Bullets and then re-signed with the team on October 3, 1995. Price scored a career-high 30 points and dished out 13 assists in a 116–109 loss to the Michael Jordan-led Chicago Bulls. He signed with the Houston Rockets as a free agent on July 16, 1996. On August 27, 1999, he was traded to the Vancouver Grizzlies as part of a 3-team deal together with Antoine Carr, Michael Dickerson, Othella Harrington and a 1st round draft pick for Steve Francis and Tony Massenburg. On June 27, 2001, he was acquired by the Sacramento Kings with Mike Bibby in exchange for Jason Williams and Nick Anderson.

== Personal life ==
Price lives in Enid, Oklahoma, with his wife and four children.

His older brother, Mark played 12 seasons in the NBA with four teams including the Cleveland Cavaliers and Washington Bullets.
