= Louisiana Rouxgaroux =

American indoor football team

- Current season
Logo

General information
- Founded: 2024
- Headquartered: Bossier City, Louisiana at the Brookshire Grocery Arena
- Colors: Maroon, Old Gold, Black
- Mascot: Roux
- LouisianaRouxgaroux.com

Personnel
- Owner: Keith Carter
- General manager: Steve Walters
- Head coach: Fred Shaw

Team history
- Shreveport Rouxgaroux (2025); Louisiana Rouxgaroux (2026–)

Home fields
- Hirsch Memorial Coliseum (2025); Brookshire Grocery Arena (2026)

League / conference affiliations
- National Arena League (2025–)

The Louisiana Rouxgaroux are a professional indoor football team based in Shreveport, Louisiana. They began play in 2025 as the Shreveport Rouxgaroux. They are members of the National Arena League and play their home games at Brookshire Grocery Arena in Bossier City, Louisiana, previous home to the af2/Arena Football League's Bossier-Shreveport Battle Wings.

== History ==
Original Shreveport Rouxgaroux logo (2025)

On July 31, 2024, the Shreveport Rouxgaroux announced their intentions to begin play in 2025 at Hirsch Coliseum, with further details coming at a press conference in two weeks. On August 15, the NAL officially announced the Rouxgaroux as their newest team, with veteran indoor football coach James Hampton serving as the team's inaugural head coach.

The Rouxgaroux will be the first indoor football team to play in the city of Shreveport since the Shreveport-Bossier Bombers played their only season as a member of the Indoor Professional Football League in 2000; coincidentally, the Bombers' fellow 2000 IPFL expansion team the Omaha Beef still exists to this very day (as the longest continuously running indoor football team in history), and are the Rouxgaroux's NAL leaguemates and defending champions. In addition, the Rouxgaroux will be the first indoor/arena team to play in the Shreveport–Bossier City metropolitan area since the Bossier–Shreveport Battle Wings played from 2001 to 2010 as a member of the af2 and the Arena Football League. On August 13, 2025, the team made a slight change to their name and logo to the Louisiana Rouxgaroux and have announced their intentions to relocate to Brookshire Grocery Arena in nearby Bossier City. On September 15th, the National Arena League announced that Keith Carter was named as the sole owner of the team.

=== Team nickname etymology ===
The Rouxgaroux are named after the mythical beast of Cajun folklore similar to a werewolf. Team owner Keith Carter told of the legends of parents and grandparents warning their children to get in bed lest the rouxgaroux "get them," as well as farmers who believe the rouxgaroux was responsible for their cattle's death, pointing out his team will continue that legacy particularly against the Omaha Beef.

== Notable players ==
- Jeff Luc
- Eric Thomas (wide receiver)
- Trayoun Maxie (defensive back)
- David Perkins (quarter back)
