= 2024 National Arena League season =

Sports season

2024 NAL season
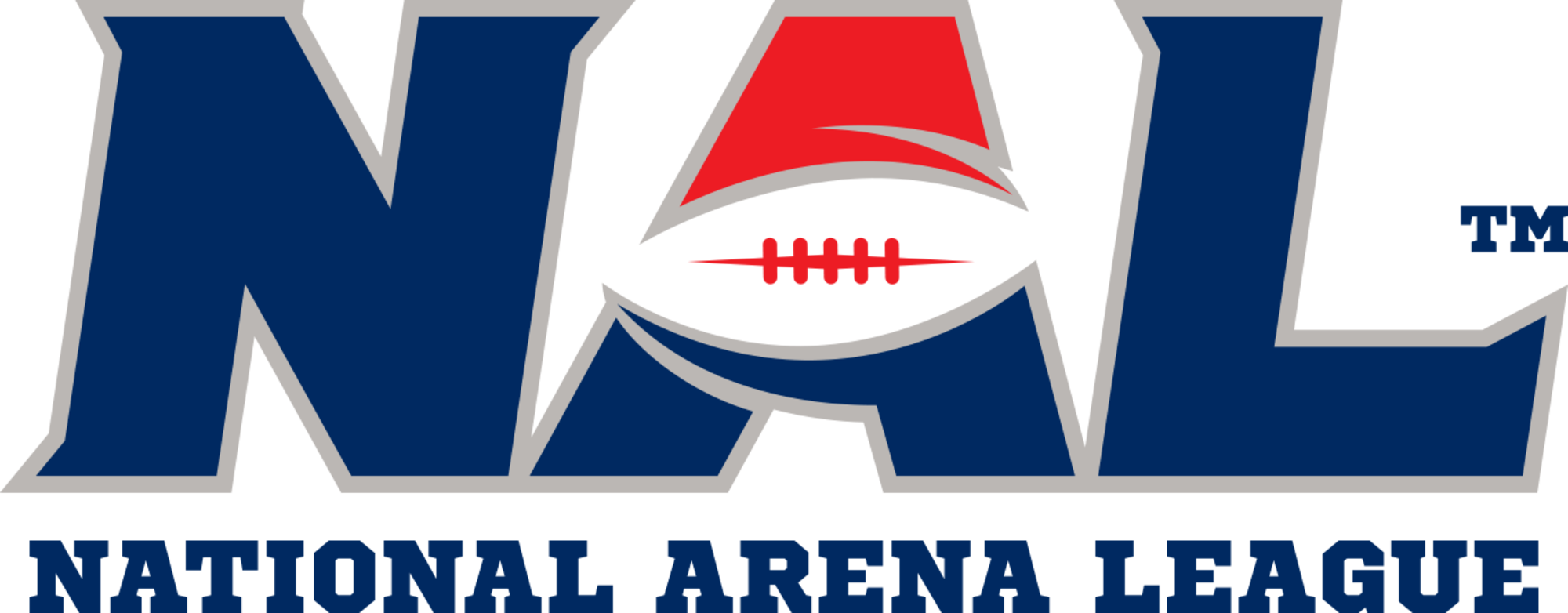
- League: National Arena League
- Sport: Indoor American football
- Duration: March 15 – June 8
- Teams: 6

Regular season
- Season champions: Omaha Beef

2024 NAL Championship
- Champions: Omaha Beef
- Runners-up: Sioux City Bandits
- Finals MVP: Tommy Armstrong Jr.

NAL seasons
- ← 2023

The 2024 National Arena League season was the seventh season of the National Arena League (NAL). The league will include six teams, five of which are new, with only the Carolina Cobras returning from the previous season.

== Offseason ==
In August 2023, the league announced it had added the Omaha Beef and Sioux City Bandits from Champions Indoor Football for the 2024 season. On August 22, 2023, the Jacksonville Sharks announced they were joining the Indoor Football League (IFL). The league added the expansion Colorado Spartans, based out of Loveland, Colorado, on August 31. Also on August 31, the Warbirds, which had been renamed as the West Texas Desert Hawks, were announced as joining the relaunched Arena Football League. On September 14, the Topeka Tropics, another CIF team, were accepted into the NAL. On September 21, the two-time American West Football Conference champions Idaho Horsemen joined the NAL. On September 26, the San Antonio Gunslingers were announced as also joining the IFL. The next day, the North Texas Bulls announced their membership in the NAL. On October 16, the Oklahoma Flying Aces were as announced as the eighth and final team for the 2024 NAL season. On February 17, 2024, the league announced that they had terminated the membership of the Bulls. On February 28, 2024, the league terminated the Tropics membership, prompting the team's planned owner to back out of the purchase agreement in protest and the current owners to release an open letter begging for new investors.

== Teams ==
Team	Location	Arena	Capacity	Founded	Joined	Head coach
Carolina Cobras	Greensboro, North Carolina	Greensboro Coliseum Complex	12,000	2017	2018	Brandon Negron
Colorado Spartans	Loveland, Colorado	Blue Arena	7,500	2023	2024	Fred Shaw
Idaho Horsemen	Nampa, Idaho	Ford Idaho Center	12,279	2018 (Note: In the American West Football Conference.)	2024	Chris Reynolds
Oklahoma Flying Aces (Note: The Oklahoma Flying Aces suspended operations mid-season amid ownership restructuring.)	Enid, Oklahoma	Chisholm Trail Coliseum	8,000	2018 (Note: In Champions Indoor Football.)	2024	Richard Davis
Omaha Beef	Omaha, Nebraska	Liberty First Credit Union Arena	4,600	2000 (Note: In the Indoor Professional Football League.)	2024	Mike Tatum
Sioux City Bandits	Sioux City, Iowa	Tyson Events Center	6,941	2000 (Note: In the original Indoor Football League.)	2024	Erv Strohbeen

== Standings ==
2024 National Arena League Standings
Team	Win	Loss	PCT	GB	PF	PA	STK
^{(1)}Omaha Beef	8	0	1.000	–	381	238	W8
^{(2)}Sioux City Bandits	5	3	.625	3	321	300	W2
Carolina Cobras	5	4	.556	3.5	392	378	L2
Colorado Spartans	4	5	.444	4.5	381	375	W1
Idaho Horsemen	1	7	.125	7	229	373	L4
Oklahoma Flying Aces†	0	4	.000	–	120	170	L4
Legend
^{(1)} – hosting Championship game
^{(2)} – clinched Championship game
† – did not finish the season
All other teams eliminated from postseason

== Season schedule ==
=== Regular season ===
All times shown are local to the home team.

==== Week 1 ====
Date	Time	Away team	Result		Home team	Stadium	Notes	Ref
March 15	7:10 p.m. CT	Oklahoma Flying Aces	24	37	Sioux City Bandits	Tyson Events Center		
March 15	7:00 p.m. MT	Carolina Cobras	51	49	Idaho Horsemen	Ford Idaho Center		

==== Week 2 ====
Date	Time	Away team	Result		Home team	Stadium	Notes	Ref
March 24	3:00 p.m. ET	Omaha Beef	54	43	Carolina Cobras	Greensboro Coliseum Complex		

==== Week 3 ====
Date	Time	Away team	Result		Home team	Stadium	Notes	Ref
March 30	6:30 p.m. CT	Colorado Spartans	32	45	Omaha Beef	Liberty First Credit Union Arena		
April 1	7:30 p.m. ET	Idaho Horsemen	6	42	Carolina Cobras	Greensboro Coliseum Complex		

==== Week 4 ====
Date	Time	Away team	Result		Home team	Stadium	Notes	Ref
April 6	7:00 p.m. ET	Colorado Spartans	35	44	Carolina Cobras	Greensboro Coliseum Complex		
April 6	7:10 p.m. CT	Oklahoma Flying Aces	24	42	Sioux City Bandits	Tyson Events Center		

==== Week 5 ====
Date	Time	Away team	Result		Home team	Stadium	Notes	Ref
April 13	7:10 p.m. CT	Colorado Spartans	61	62	Sioux City Bandits	Tyson Events Center		

==== Week 6 ====
Date	Time	Away team	Result		Home team	Stadium	Notes	Ref
April 19	7:00 p.m. CT	Idaho Horsemen	14	63	Omaha Beef	Liberty First Credit Union Arena		
April 19	7:00 p.m. MT	Carolina Cobras	38	55	Colorado Spartans	Blue Arena		

==== Week 7 ====
Date	Time	Away team	Result		Home team	Stadium	Notes	Ref
April 27	7:00 p.m. MT	Oklahoma Flying Aces	36	49	Idaho Horsemen	Ford Idaho Center		
April 28	3:00 p.m. ET	Sioux City Bandits	24	55	Carolina Cobras	Greensboro Coliseum Complex		

==== Week 8 ====
Date	Time	Away team	Result		Home team	Stadium	Notes	Ref
May 4	6:30 p.m. CT	Oklahoma Flying Aces	36	42	Omaha Beef	Liberty First Credit Union Arena		
May 5	5:00 p.m. MT	Colorado Spartans	34	33	Idaho Horsemen	Ford Idaho Center		

==== Week 9 ====
Date	Time	Away team	Result		Home team	Stadium	Notes	Ref
May 11	6:30 p.m. CT	Sioux City Bandits	6	33	Omaha Beef	Liberty First Credit Union Arena		

==== Week 10 ====
Date	Time	Away team	Result		Home team	Stadium	Notes	Ref
May 17	7:00 p.m. MT	Idaho Horsemen	18	55	Colorado Spartans	Blue Arena		
May 18	7:10 p.m. CT	Omaha Beef	34	32	Sioux City Bandits	Tyson Events Center		

==== Week 11 ====
Date	Time	Away team	Result		Home team	Stadium	Notes	Ref
May 25	7:00 p.m. ET	Colorado Spartans	39	53	Carolina Cobras	Greensboro Coliseum Complex		
May 25	7:00 p.m. MT	Sioux City Bandits	56	34	Idaho Horsemen	Ford Idaho Center		

==== Week 12 ====
Date	Time	Away team	Result		Home team	Stadium	Notes	Ref
June 1	7:10 p.m. CT	Carolina Cobras	35	62	Sioux City Bandits	Tyson Events Center		
June 1	7:00 p.m. MT	Omaha Beef	56	34	Colorado Spartans	Blue Arena		

==== Week 13 ====
Date	Time	Away team	Result		Home team	Stadium	Notes	Ref
June 8	6:30 p.m. CT	Carolina Cobras	31	54	Omaha Beef	Liberty First Credit Union Arena		
June 8	7:00 p.m. MT	Idaho Horsemen	26	36	Colorado Spartans	Blue Arena		

=== Postseason ===
==== NAL Championship ====
Date	Time	Away team	Result		Home team	Stadium	Notes	Ref
June 15	6:30 p.m. CT	Sioux City Bandits	46	47	Omaha Beef	Liberty First Credit Union Arena	Double overtime result	

== Awards ==
Award	Winner	Position	Team
Most Valuable Player	Tommy Armstrong Jr.	Quarterback	Omaha Beef
Coach of the Year	Brandon Negron	Head coach	Carolina Cobras
Offensive Player of the Year	Jason Whittaker	Quarterback	Colorado Spartans
Defensive Player of the Year	Rashad Flanders	Defensive back	Idaho Horsemen
Special Teams Player of the Year	Kevin Dido-Weber	Kicker	Carolina Cobras
Offensive Rookie of the Year	Steven Newbold Jr	Wide receiver	Colorado Spartans
Defensive Rookie of the Year	Javaris Thompson	Defensive back	Colorado Spartans

== See also ==
- 2024 American Indoor Football season
- 2024 Arena Football League season
- 2024 Indoor Football League season
- 2024 The Arena League season
