= 2024 American Indoor Football season =

- League: American Indoor Football
- Sport: Indoor football
- Duration: March 17 – June 14
- Teams: 6

2024
- Season champions: Columbus Lions

Playoffs
- Finals venue: Columbus Civic Center
- Finals champions: Columbus Lions
- Runners-up: Corpus Christi Tritons

AIF seasons
- ← 2016 2025 →

The 2024 American Indoor Football season was the twelfth season of American Indoor Football (AIF) and the first season after an eight-year hiatus. The league played the season with six teams, including the last league champions, the Columbus Lions.

== Offseason ==
On July 3, 2023, John Morris announced that the league would indeed relaunch in 2024 with four new teams: Cedar Rapids River Kings, Corpus Christi Tritons, RiverCity Rage and West Virginia Miners. On August 4, 2023, the league announced that the Columbus Lions, the last team to win the AIF Championship in 2016, were returning to the league. On August 24, 2023, the league announced that the Amarillo Venom would return and join the AIF for the 2024 season. On September 11, 2023, the league announced that an expansion team to be based in Albany, Georgia, would also join the AIF for 2024 as its eighth franchise. On September 29, 2023, the league announced the Beaumont Renegades as their ninth team for the 2024 season, but on October 30, the league announced that the Renegades will play an exhibition schedule only in 2024, and will join the league full time in 2025, while the AIF granted West Virginia Miners release from the league after change in the team ownership group.

On February 21, 2024, the league announced that the Flint Rivergators would not play in the 2024 season and would re-evaluate the team's future. Prior to their game on March 24, 2024, the league announced that the Mississippi Raiders would be removed from the league’s schedule due to financial problems involved in the change in ownership during the offseason. The future of the team is unknown.

== Teams ==
Team	Location	Arena	Capacity	Founded	Joined	Head coach
Amarillo Venom	Amarillo, Texas	Amarillo Civic Center	4,912	2003	2024	Rick Kranz
Cedar Rapids River Kings (Note: Cedar Rapids were granted their release from league play after two matches following the suspension of co-owner Dominic Montero.)	Cedar Rapids, Iowa	Alliant Energy PowerHouse	9,000	2011	2024	Daron Clark
Columbus Lions	Columbus, Georgia	Columbus Civic Center	7,573	2006	2024	Damian Daniels
Corpus Christi Tritons	Corpus Christi, Texas	American Bank Center	10,000	2023	2024	Bradly Chavez
Harrisburg Stampede	Harrisburg, Pennsylvania	Pennsylvania Farm Show Complex & Expo Center	2,400	2008	2024	Bernie Nowotarski
Mississippi Raiders (Note: Mississippi was removed from the schedule due to financial struggles with change in ownership.)	Batesville, Mississippi	Batesville Civic Center	3,200	2019	2024	Eddie Strong

== Standings ==
2024 American Indoor Football Standings
Team	Win	Loss	PCT	GB	PF	PA	STK
^{(1)}Columbus Lions	5	0	1.000	–	320	106	W5
^{(2)}Corpus Christi Tritons	4	1	.800	1.0	214	160	L1
Harrisburg Stampede	1	3	.250	3.5	95	227	L3
Amarillo Venom	1	4	.200	4.0	175	276	W1
Mississippi Raiders†	0	1	.000	–	0	2	L1
Cedar Rapids River Kings†	0	2	.000	–	67	102	L2
Legend
^{(1)} – hosts Championship game
^{(2)} – clinched Championship game
† – Did not finish the season
All other teams eliminated from postseason

== Season schedule ==
=== Regular season ===
All times shown are local to the home team.

==== Week 1 ====
Date	Time	Away team	Result		Home team	Stadium	Notes	Ref
March 17	7:00 p.m. CT	Columbus Lions	47	26	Amarillo Venom	Amarillo Civic Center		

==== Week 2 ====
Date	Time	Away team	Result		Home team	Stadium	Notes	Ref
March 23	6:00 p.m. CT	Corpus Christi Tritons	2	0	Mississippi Raiders	Batesville Civic Center	Mississippi forfeited this game before folding.	

==== Week 3 ====
Date	Time	Away team	Result		Home team	Stadium	Notes	Ref
March 30	7:00 p.m. CT	Amarillo Venom	50	76	Corpus Christi Tritons	American Bank Center		

==== Week 4 ====
Date	Time	Away team	Result		Home team	Stadium	Notes	Ref
April 6	7:00 p.m. ET	Cedar Rapids River Kings	29	44	Harrisburg Stampede	Pennsylvania Farm Show Complex & Expo Center		

==== Week 5 ====
Date	Time	Away team	Result		Home team	Stadium	Notes	Ref
April 12	7:00 p.m. ET	Amarillo Venom	27	74	Columbus Lions	Columbus Civic Center		
April 14	3:00 p.m. CT	Cedar Rapids River Kings	38	58	Corpus Christi Tritons	American Bank Center		

==== Week 6 ====
Date	Time	Away team	Result		Home team	Stadium	Notes	Ref
April 18	7:00 p.m. ET	Harrisburg Stampede	19	73	Columbus Lions	Columbus Civic Center		

==== Week 7 ====
Date	Time	Away team	Result		Home team	Stadium	Notes	Ref
April 27	7:00 p.m. ET	Columbus Lions	42	34	Harrisburg Stampede	Pennsylvania Farm Show Complex & Expo Center		
April 27	7:00 p.m. CT	Corpus Christi Tritons	48	34	Amarillo Venom	Amarillo Civic Center		

==== Week 8 ====
No games were played this week.

==== Week 9 ====
Date	Time	Away team	Result		Home team	Stadium	Notes	Ref
May 11	7:00 p.m. CT	Corpus Christi Tritons	30	38	Amarillo Venom	Amarillo Civic Center		

==== Week 10 ====
The Harrisburg Stampede and the Cedar Rapids River Kings were due to play this week, but the River Kings opted to conclude their regular season and instead play exhibition matches. This move also affected the previous week's match against the Columbus Lions, a rematch with the Stampede on June 1, and a match against the Corpus Christi Tritons on June 6. The news came amid a scandal involving River Kings co-owner Dominic Montero.

==== Week 11 ====
Date	Time	Away team	Result		Home team	Stadium	Notes	Ref
May 25	7:00 p.m. ET	Harrisburg Stampede	0	83	Columbus Lions	Columbus Civic Center		

==== Week 12 ====
The match between the Amarillo Venom and the Corpus Christi Tritons this week was cancelled for unknown reasons. The Tritons instead played the Dallas Falcons of American Arena League 2. The score was 52-20

=== Championship Game ===
On May 7, AIF announced a revised playoff format: the top two teams will play in a single championship game on June 14. The Lions were confirmed to host the game after winning over the Harrisburg Stampede on May 25.

Date	Time	Away team	Result		Home team	Stadium	Notes	Ref
June 14	7:00 p.m. ET	Corpus Christi Tritons	20	46	Columbus Lions	Columbus Civic Center		

== Media ==
AIF team media deals
Team	TV Station(s)
Amarillo Venom	KFDA-TV; Texas Panhandle Sports Network
Cedar Rapids River Kings	None
Columbus Lions	YouTube
Corpus Christi Tritons	YouTube
Harrisburg Stampede	YouTube

== See also ==
- 2024 Arena Football League season
- 2024 Indoor Football League season
- 2024 National Arena League season
- 2024 The Arena League season
