= Corpus Christi Tritons =

Arena football team based in Texas, US

- Current season
Logo

General information
- Founded: 2023
- Folded: 2025
- Headquartered: American Bank Center in Corpus Christi, Texas
- Colors: Black, ocean blue, silver, white
- TritonsArenaFootball.com

Personnel
- CEO: Kevin Cecil (CEO)
- General manager: Johnathan Young
- Head coach: Johnny Anderson

Team history
- Corpus Christi Tritons (2024–2025)

Home fields
- American Bank Center (2024–2025)

League / conference affiliations
- American Indoor Football (2024); Arena Football One (2025); Central Division (2025)

The Corpus Christi Tritons were a professional indoor football team based in Corpus Christi, Texas. They started as an expansion team in American Indoor Football in 2024 and played their home games at the American Bank Center; in 2025, they were members of Arena Football One (AF1). The team followed in the history of indoor football in the city with the also now-defunct Corpus Christi Hammerheads/Fury, who played in several leagues between 2003 and 2016, the Corpus Christi Sharks from the af2 from 2007 to 2009 and the Corpus Christi Rage, who folded halfway through their lone season in the NAL in 2017.

== History ==
=== American Indoor Football ===
On July 3, 2023, American Indoor Football announced that Corpus Christi, Texas, would become the third city in the newly revived league to host a new expansion franchise owned by Kevin Cecil and Joseph Alvey. The name, logos and colors were unveiled as those of the Corpus Christi Tritons.

On July 21, 2023, the team announced its inaugural head coach Bradly Chavez.

On June 14, 2024, the Tritons made it all the way to the AIF American Bowl Championship game, but lost to the Columbus Lions 46-20.

=== Exclusion from National Arena League ===
On July 9, 2024, the Tritons, along with several others teams from the AIF, announced their intentions to play in the National Arena League. On October 7, 2024, the Tritons announced that defense coordinator Johnny Anderson would become their new head coach and the second in team history just three days after they parted ways with coach Bradly Chavez. On October 14, 2024, the Tritons announced on their Facebook page that they were left out of the 2025 NAL schedule as they were set to join the league for that season. The team expressed frustration with the league's decision to not include them in the schedule and were seeking different avenues to play in the 2025 campaign.

=== Arena Football One ===
On November 13, 2024, the Tritons and Arena Football One jointly announced that the Tritons had applied for and were accepted into AF1 as that league's 13th franchise. They would play in the Central Division along with the Salina Liberty and Southwest Kansas Storm (The Wichita Regulators went dormant for 2025). Their first signee was running back Tre Coleman.

Most of the Tritons roster refused to play the April 25 game against the Albany Firebirds for reasons never officially announced but "amid social media rumors of the team’s financial struggles," resulting in the Tritons fielding a "makeshift" roster of replacement players, including re-hiring Kyle Cool (the Triton's starting quarterback from 2023), and suffering an exceptionally lopsided 100–12 loss to the Firebirds. On April 27, 2025, Darius Prince posted a cryptic photo on his Facebook page with a quote saying, "Thank you Corpus for the memories", and a picture with Tritons apparel placed in front of a doorstep, indicating that he had left the team. Prince and nine other defectors were either suspended or released on April 29. Defensive end Robert Fuentes stated that players had not been paid. In a statement, AF1 stated that it was aware of the allegations "and more that is not public at this time" and was conducting an ongoing investigation into the matter. Four of those released players, including Prince, ended up on the roster of AF1 chairman Steve Titus's team, the Billings Outlaws, two days later. The replacement Tritons would go on to lose all of their remaining games.

The Tritons released a statement on their social media on September 26 stating that the team was "here to stay," had not relocated and was "working on" settling its remaining debts, in apparent response to speculation following former Tritons investor Corey Cunningham moving on to the Kentucky Barrels during the 2025 offseason. The announcement came shortly after AF1 quietly dropped the Tritons from the list of teams on its Web site without explanation and the team's own Web site going offline. Bobby DeVoursney, an executive with the Nashville Kats, indicated that the Barrels had assumed the Tritons' AF1 franchise and spot in that league, akin to a relocation.

== Season-by-season results ==
League champions	Playoff berth	League leader

Season	League	Regular season			Postseason results
Season	League	Finish	Wins	Losses	Postseason results
2024	AIF	2nd	4	1	Lost Championship (Columbus, 20-46)
2025	AF1	7th	3	7	
Totals			7	8	All-time regular season record
Totals			0	1	All-time postseason record
Totals			7	9	All-time regular season and postseason record

== Notable players ==
- Joe Powell
