= Oklahoma Storm =

- League: USBL 1999–2007
- Founded: 1999
- Folded: 2007
- History: Oklahoma Storm (1999–2007)
- Arena: Mark Price Arena
- Capacity: 2,500
- Location: Enid, Oklahoma
- Team colors: Red, black, and white
- Head coach: Roy Rogers
- Ownership: Oklahoma Storm, LLC
- Championships: 1 USBL (2002)
- Division titles: 2005, 2006

The Oklahoma Storm was a United States Basketball League (USBL) team in Enid, Oklahoma.

== History ==
Founded by sports agent and attorney James Sears Bryant, the Storm joined the USBL championship in 2000. Bryan Gates was the Storm's coach. During its first season the club under coach Denny Price reached the USNL Final losing to Dodge City Legend by 89-86.

The team under head coach Kareem Abdul-Jabbar won the USBL title in 2002, defeating Kansas with a final score of 122–109. The Oklahoma Storm disbanded following the 2007 season when the USBL dissolved.

The team played its home games at Mark Price Arena and the Chisholm Trail Expo Center.

Former logo

Several Storm players, including Willie Burton, LaBradford Smith, Richard Dumas, Gaylon Nickerson, Brent Price, James Lang, Chris Porter, Reggie Slater, Ira Newble, Bubba Wells, Kelly McCarty, Tony Bobbitt and Jamario Moon, played for the NBA either before or after playing for the Storm. Another notable player included Doug Gottlieb.

== Seasons ==
Stagione	League	Name	W	G	%	Place	Play-off	Coach
2000	USBL	Oklahoma Storm	14	16	46,7	4º	Final	Bryan Gates; Denny Price
2001	USBL	Oklahoma Storm	20	10	66,7	1º	Quarter finals	Bryan Gates
2002	USBL	Oklahoma Storm	17	13	56,7	2º	Champions	Kareem Abdul-Jabbar
2003	USBL	Oklahoma Storm	17	13	56,7	2º	Semifinals	Todd Chambers
2004	USBL	Oklahoma Storm	15	15	50,0	4º	Quarter finals	Todd Chambers
2005	USBL	Oklahoma Storm	18	12	60,0	1º	Semifinals	Bryan Gates
2006	USBL	Oklahoma Storm	22	8	73,3	1º	Semifinals	Bryan Gates
2007	USBL	Oklahoma Storm	12	18	35,7	6º	Round robin	Roy Rogers

== Home arenas ==
- 2000: Chisholm Trail Expo Center Coliseum, cap: 8,000, (Enid, Oklahoma)
- 2000-2007: Mark Price Arena, cap: 2,500, (Enid, Oklahoma)

== See also ==
- Oklahoma Cavalry
- Phillips 66ers
- Tulsa Shock
