= Oklahoma Flying Aces =

American indoor football team

Logo

General information
- Founded: 2018
- Headquartered: Enid, Oklahoma at the Chisholm Trail Expo Center
- Colors: Black, blue, old gold, white
- GoFlyingAces.com

Personnel
- Owners: Red Dirt Sports and Entertainment
- General manager: Richard Davis
- Head coach: Richard Davis
- President: Richard Davis

Team history
- Oklahoma Flying Aces (2019, 2024)

Home fields
- Stride Bank Center (2019); Chisholm Trail Expo Center (2024)

League / conference affiliations
- Champions Indoor Football (2019); South Conference (2019); National Arena League (2024)

The Oklahoma Flying Aces are a dormant professional indoor football team based in Enid, Oklahoma. The team was founded in 2018 as an expansion franchise in Champions Indoor Football for the 2019 season. The team was dormant for the 2021 season, but did not return for the 2022 season. The Flying Aces joined the National Arena League for the 2024 season but became dormant before the season was completed.

== History ==
The franchise was announced by Champions Indoor Football (CIF) in 2018 as a 2019 expansion team and selected the name "Flying Aces" from a name-the-team contest in October 2018. Playing at Stride Bank Center, they finished their inaugural season with a 2–10 record, with their only wins a forfeit over the folded Texas Revolution and a semi-professional team, the NTX Savages, that filled in for the home game originally scheduled against the Revolution. The team's second season was cancelled before it could begin due to the COVID-19 pandemic. On April 1, 2021, the team withdrew from the 2021 season one week before it was scheduled for its first game citing a drastically increased workers' compensation insurance from $5000 in 2019 to $150000 for 2021. The team was replaced on the CIF schedule by a re-launched Dodge City Law with the Law inheriting the Flying Aces' roster and staff.

The Flying Aces were not included in the 2022 schedule and appeared to have suspended operations.

In October 2023, the Flying Aces announced they would join the National Arena League and play their home games at the 8,000-seat Chisholm Trail Expo Center. In May 2024, the team and the league "mutually agreed to allow football operations to go dormant for the remainder of the 2024 season" to restructure.

== Season-by-season results ==
League champions	Playoff berth	League leader

Season	League	Regular season			Postseason results
Season	League	Finish	Wins	Losses	Postseason results
2019	CIF	3rd	2	10	Did not qualify
2020	Season cancelled due to COVID-19 pandemic				
2021	Dormant year				
2022	Dormant year				
2023	Dormant year				
2024	NAL	6th	0	4	Did not qualify
Totals			2	14	All-time regular season record
Totals			0	0	All-time postseason record
Totals			2	14	All-time regular season and postseason record

== Head coaches ==
Name	Tenure	Regular season			Playoffs		Awards
Name	Tenure	W	L	Win%	W	L	Awards
Richard Davis	2019, 2024	2	14	.125	0	0	
