= Chisholm Trail Coliseum =

Multipurpose arena in Oklahoma, USA

- Garfield County Expo Center
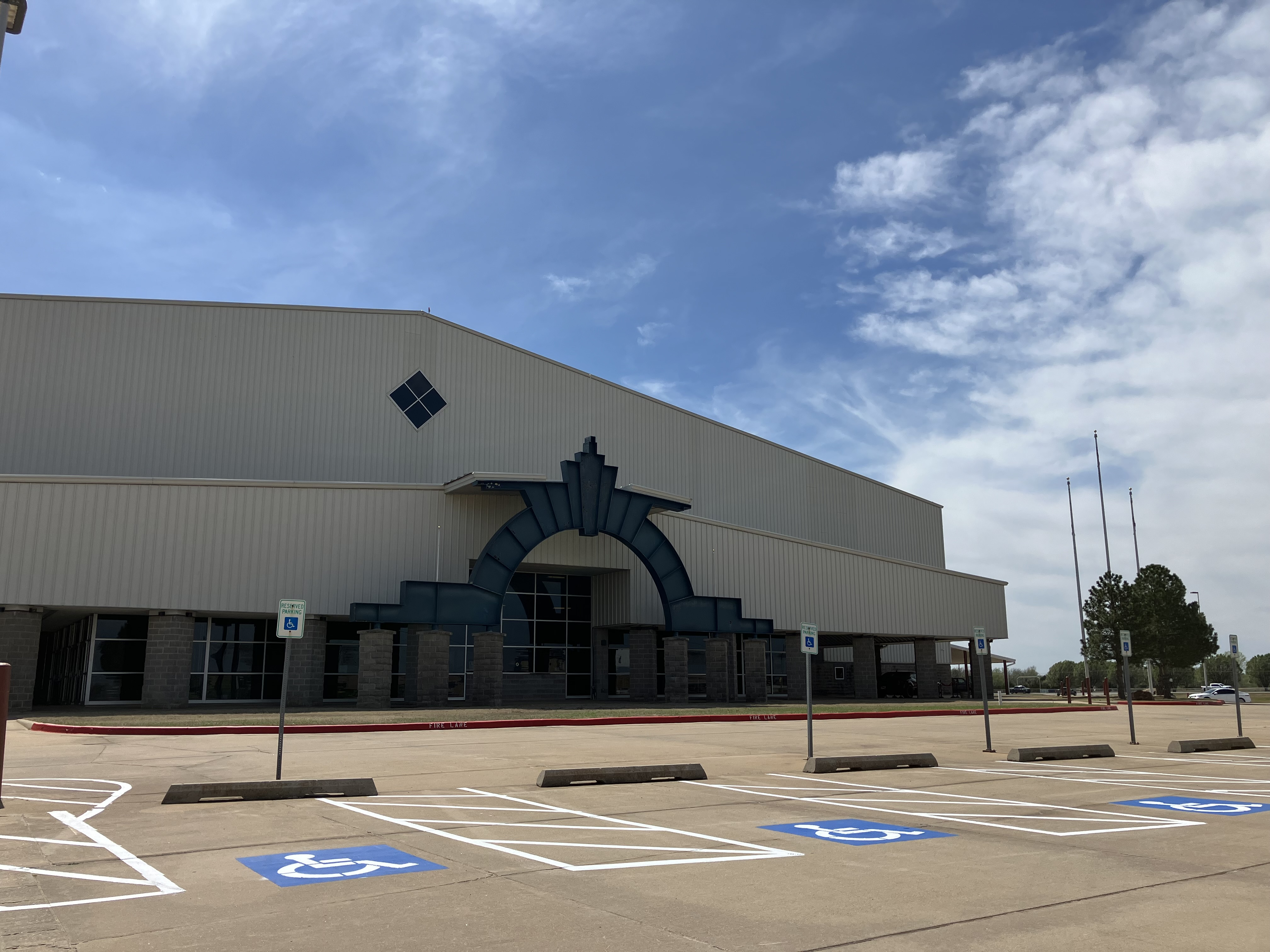
- Interactive map of Chisholm Trail Coliseum
- Location: Enid, Oklahoma, United States
- Coordinates: 36.433158°N 97.879236°W
- Owner: Garfield County, Oklahoma
- Capacity: 8,000

Construction
- Opened: 1998
- Architect: Silas N. Vonn

Tenants
- Oklahoma Storm (USBL) 2000–2007; Oklahoma Flying Aces (NAL) 2024

The Chisholm Trail Coliseum is an 8,000-seat multi-purpose arena located at the Garfield County Fairgrounds in Enid, Oklahoma. The coliseum, also called the Garfield County Expo Center was built in 1998. It was home to the Oklahoma Storm USBL basketball team, and also serves as a site for various conventions, including the Garfield County Free Fair and KNID Agrifest. In late April 2009, the Coliseum suffered damage when it was hit by an EF2 tornado, and again in August 2011 when a 96 mph wind storm hit Enid.

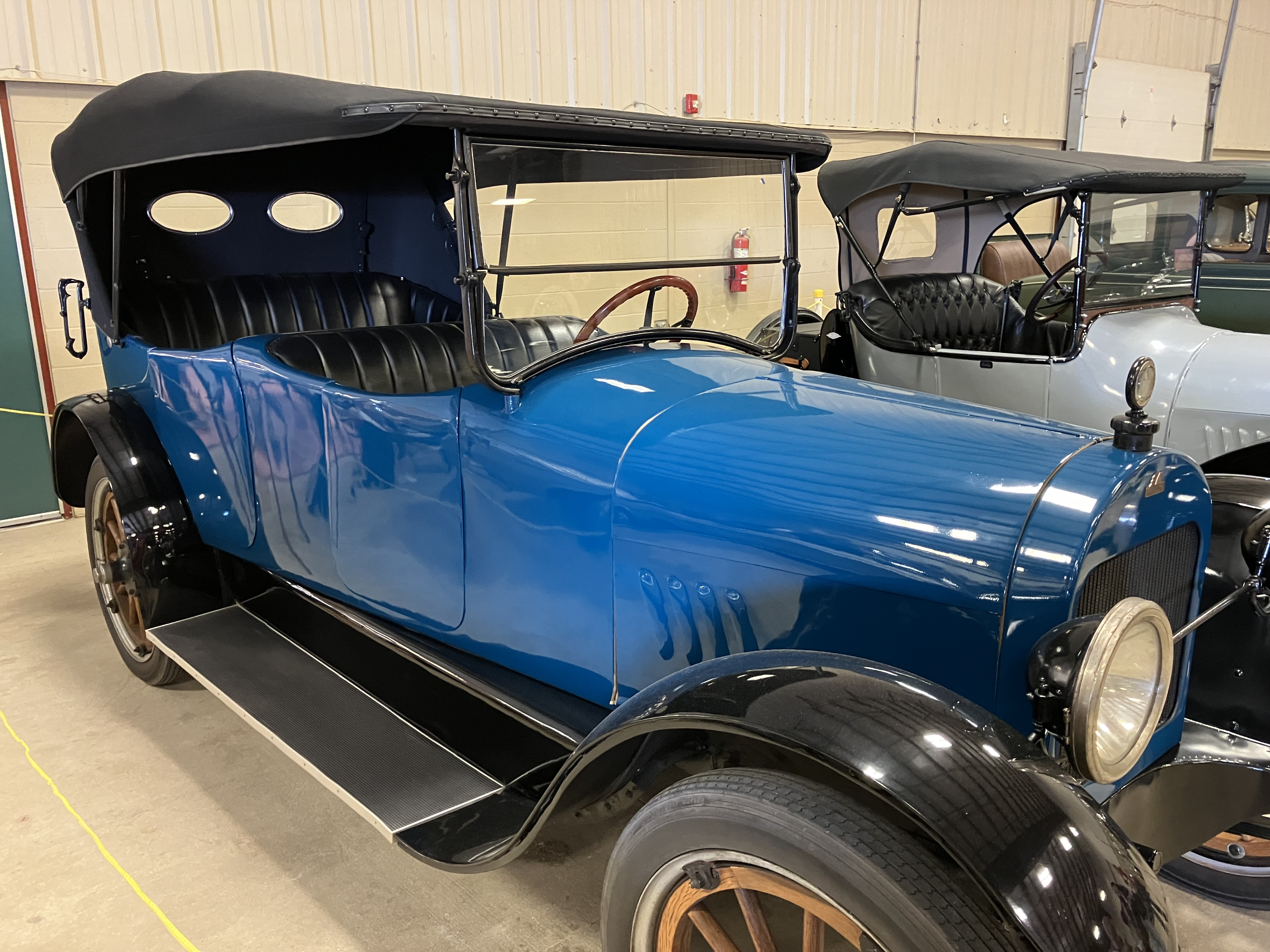
The last known surviving Geronimo Car sits at the Chisholm Trail Expo Center in Enid, Oklahoma during the Scouting America Last Frontier Car Show on March 29, 2025.

Garfield County Fair 2026 at Chisholm Trail Expo Center in Enid, Oklahoma.
