= Colorado Spartans =

Arena football team in Denver, Colorado

- Current season
Logo

General information
- Founded: 2023
- Headquartered: Denver, Colorado at the Denver Coliseum
- Colors: Black, sky blue, silver
- CO-Spartans.com

Personnel
- Owner: Tony Thompson
- General manager: Brandon Negron
- Head coach: Fred Shaw

Team history
- Colorado Spartans (2024–present)

Home fields
- Denver Coliseum (2024–present)

League / conference affiliations
- National Arena League (2024–present)

The Colorado Spartans are a professional indoor football team based in Denver, Colorado. They are an expansion team that are current members of the National Arena League. They play their home games at the Denver Coliseum in Denver, Colorado.

== History ==
Original logo from 2023 to 2024

On August 31, 2023, the National Arena League announced the addition of the Spartans as an expansion team. They previously played in Loveland following the Colorado Ice/Crush of the Indoor Football League. On October 2, 2024, the Spartans announced their move to Denver and the Denver Coliseum for the 2025 National Arena League season.

Standings
Year	League	Home	Away	Division	Playoffs	Non-League
2024	4-5	3-1	1-4	N/A	N/A	2–0
2025	7-3	4-1	3-2	3-3	0-1	1–0*
2026	5-5	4-1	1-4	N/A	0-1	N/A
Total	16-13	11-3	5-10	3-3	0-2	3–0

- Counted towards League Standings

Playoffs: Loss at Omaha 54–71 on 6/7/2025 * Loss at Salina 48-50 on 6/7/2026

=== Head to Head ===
Team	Total	Home	Away	PF	PA
Amarillo Warbirds	1-0	1-0	N/A	50	11
Carolina Cobras	1-2	1-0	0-2	129	135
Columbus Lions	1-0	1-0	N/A	42	38
Dallas Bulls	1-0	N/A	1-0	42	12
Idaho Horsemen	5-0	3-0	2-0	242	98
Omaha Beef	1-5	1-2	0-3	184	225
Pueblo Punishers	1-2	1-1	0-1	139	144
Salina Liberty	1-1	1-0	0-1	85	87
Sioux City Bandits	1-2	N/A	1-2	148	128
SW Kansas Storm	0-1	N/A	0-1	41	48
Wheeling Miners	2-0	1-0	1-0	90	69

The Oklahoma Flying Aces, Beaumont Renegades, & Shreveport/Louisiana Rouxgaroux played concurrently with the Spartans, but haven't/won't gone head to head. The Topeka Tropics, Amarillo Dusters, Corpus Christi Tritons, & Harrisburg Stampede were league members, but never hit the field during the Spartan's tenure.

Playoffs Head to Head
Team	Total	Home	Away	PF	PA
Omaha Beef	0-1	N/A	0-1	54	71
Salina Liberty	0-1	N/A	0-1	48	50

Non League
Team	Total	Home	Away	PF	PA
Northern Colorado Nightmare	1-0	1-0	N/A	70	12
Cedar Rapids River Kings	1-0	1-0	N/A	35	26
Las Vegas Kings	1–0*	1-0	N/A	69	18

- The NAL counts this game towards the League Standings

== Current roster ==
Colorado Spartans roster
Quarterbacks: 5 Javin Kilgo; Running backs Wide receivers: 3 Steven Newbold, Jr. DB; 11 Bizzet Woodley K	Offensive linemen: 73 Anthony Wilson, Jr.; 67 Dallas Reins; Defensive linemen: 10 Samuel Hammond LS; 56 Hunter O’Connor	Linebackers: 6 Esaias Gandy S; Defensive backs: 1 Travion Mosby WR; 0 Chris Perry RB; 2 JaKaylen Jackson; 8 LaRonji Vasan-McCoy; 27 Dillon Thomas; 7 Kameron Kendle; Special teams: 17 Wilson Yee K	Reserve lists: Currently vacant; Rookies in italics; Roster updated March 14, 2024; 25 Active, Inactive

=== Team Awards ===
Offensive Player of the Year 2024 Jason Whittaker-QB Offensive Rookie of the Year 2024 Steven Newbold Jr.-WR Defensive Rookie of the Year 2024 Javaris Thompson-DB Best Dance Team 2024 Defensive Player of the Year 2025 Sam Hammond-DL Special Teams Player of the Year 2025 Luiz Ferreira-K Best Dance Team 2026

All-NAL 2025
Player	Position
Bizzet Woodley	WR
Easias Gandy	LB
Sam Hammond	DL
Isaiah Hall	DB
Luiz Ferreira	K
Faleaoga Russell	OL (Honorable Mention)
Byron Cooper	LB (Honorable Mention)
Corey Henry	DL (Honorable Mention)

2024 Players of the Week
Offense	Position	Week(s)	Defense	Position	Week(s)	Special Teams	Position	Week(s)
Jason Whittaker	QB	5	Rick Rumph	DB	13	Luiz Ferreira	K	6, 10
Steven Newbold	WR	10				Steven Newbold	KR	11
Ladarius Skelton	QB	12						

2025 Players of the Week
Offense	Position	Week(s)	Defense	Position	Week(s)	Special Teams	Position	Week(s)
Alexis Rosario	RB	8	Easias Gandy	LB	1, 7	Luiz Ferreira	K	8, 11, 12
Andre Sale	QB	11,12	Sam Hammond	DL	8			
			DeMario Mays	DB	12			

2026 Players of the Week
Offense	Position	Week(s)	Defense	Position	Week(s)	Special Teams	Position	Week(s)
Steven Newbold	WR	12	Dillon Thomas	DB	6	Wilson Yee	K	13, P1
Javin Kilgo	QB	13	Travion Mosby	DB	7			
