= 2019 Champions Indoor Football season =

Season in the Champions Indoor Football League

- League: Champions Indoor Football
- Sport: Indoor football
- Duration: March 23 – June 22

Regular season
- Season champions: Duke City Gladiators

Playoffs
- North Conference champions: Salina Liberty
- North Conference runners-up: Omaha Beef
- South Conference champions: Duke City Gladiators
- South Conference runners-up: Amarillo Venom

Champions Bowl V
- Champions: Duke City Gladiators
- Runners-up: Salina Liberty

Champions Indoor Football seasons
- ← 2018 2021 →

The 2019 Champions Indoor Football season was the fifth season of the CIF. The regular season began on March 23 when the Salina Liberty traveled to the Amarillo Venom. The regular season concluded on June 22. Two teams per conference advanced to the Champions Bowl playoffs, with the top seed in each conference hosting their conference's second seed in the first round.

== League changes ==
During the 2018 season, it was announced that after a change in ownership, the West Michigan Ironmen would return to the CIF after playing a season in the semi-professional Midwest Professional Indoor Football. The league also added an expansion team called the Oklahoma Flying Aces in Enid, Oklahoma. During the offseason, the CIF lost the Bismarck Bucks and Quad City Steamwheelers to the IFL. When the 2019 schedule was released, both the West Michigan Ironmen and the Kansas City Phantoms had been removed as members. On May 9, the Texas Revolution folded during the season.

== Standings ==
North Conference
Team	W	L	PCT	PF	PA
x–Salina Liberty	9	5	.643	682	603
y–Sioux City Bandits	8	5	.615	578	503
Omaha Beef	7	5	.583	692	592
Wichita Force	2	10	.167	380	663
South Conference
Team	W	L	PCT	PF	PA
z–Duke City Gladiators	11	3	.786	830	468
y-Amarillo Venom	8	5	.615	756	720
Oklahoma Flying Aces	2	10	.167	457	630
(Note: The Texas Revolution ceased operations on May 7. Their remaining games were given as forfeits.)Texas Revolution	4	5	.444	269	253

z - clinched top overall seed
x - clinched conference title
y - clinched playoff berth
