= Kentucky Barrels =

American indoor football team

Logo

General information
- Founded: 2025
- Headquartered: Truist Arena in Highland Heights, Kentucky
- Colors: Blue, Brown, Gold
- KYBarrelsFootball.com

Personnel
- Owner: Corey Cunningham
- General manager: Cedric Walker
- Head coach: Cedric Walker

Team history
- Kentucky Barrels (2025–present)

Home fields
- Truist Arena (2026–present)

League / conference affiliations
- Arena Football One (2026–present)

The Kentucky Barrels were a professional arena football team based in Highland Heights, Kentucky, that competed in Arena Football One (AF1). The team played its home games at Truist Arena, located on the campus of Northern Kentucky University.

== History ==
=== Arena Football One (2026) ===
During the 2025 Arena Football One season, Corey Cunningham was involved in the operations of the Corpus Christi Tritons, a team that had seen much of its roster quit midseason after disputes with ownership over finances. After the regular season ended, Cunningham left the Tritons and contacted commissioner Jeff Fisher inquiring about a franchise for the northern Kentucky area; Cunningham is a Northern Kentucky University alumnus. In a later statement, Nashville Kats CEO Bobby DeVoursney indicated that this team would serve as a replacement for the Tritons, a move the Tritons protested.

Northern Kentucky is in the Cincinnati metropolitan area; Cincinnati, Ohio had previously been identified as a host city in AF1's predecessor, the 2024 Arena Football League, but all of Cincinnati's arenas had rejected that league's advances and the team never played.

On August 18, 2025, just days after the announcement of the addition of the Beaumont Renegades to the league, they officially welcomed the Kentucky Barrels as the newest expansion team, with Cunningham as its owner. They also announced that the team's inaugural head coach and general manager would be former Billings Outlaws head coach and ArenaBowl champion Cedric Walker. The Barrels are the latest team to play in the Greater Cincinnati area. The area has a brief history with arena football with former Arena Football League and af2 teams such as the Cincinnati Rockers (1992–1993), Cincinnati Swarm (2003) and Cincinnati Jungle Kats (2007). They are the latest team to play in Highland Heights, Kentucky, since the Northern Kentucky Nightmare (American Indoor Football in 2016).

The Barrels played fewer home games than most of the rest of AF1's teams, including only one scheduled after May 17, and had to play much of their schedule on the West Coast, compared to the nearby Nashville Kats who played no West Coast franchises; the league claimed that this was due to schedule conflicts at Truist Arena. After a strong start, the Barrels suddenly fell into turmoil late in the 2026 season, with the cancellation of all its remaining home games (ostensibly due to the Oregon Lightning's departure from the league, and including not being allowed to host a home playoff game the team had earned, allegedly due to yet another arena scheduling conflict) and the sudden suspension and/or release of 17 of its 24 active roster players, without comment by the team or league. Its July 4 and 11 contests featured a roster composed almost entirely of replacement players. Cunningham later stated that the Barrels players had gone on strike following the schedule change because they wanted financial compensation for the increased travel; the strike was resolved following the July 11 contest, with most of the players agreeing to return (except for their starting quarterback, who signed with the BC Lions of the CFL during the strike).
