= Brookshire Grocery Arena =

Arena in Bossier City, Louisiana, US

Coordinates: 32°27′54.6″N 93°40′24.9″W

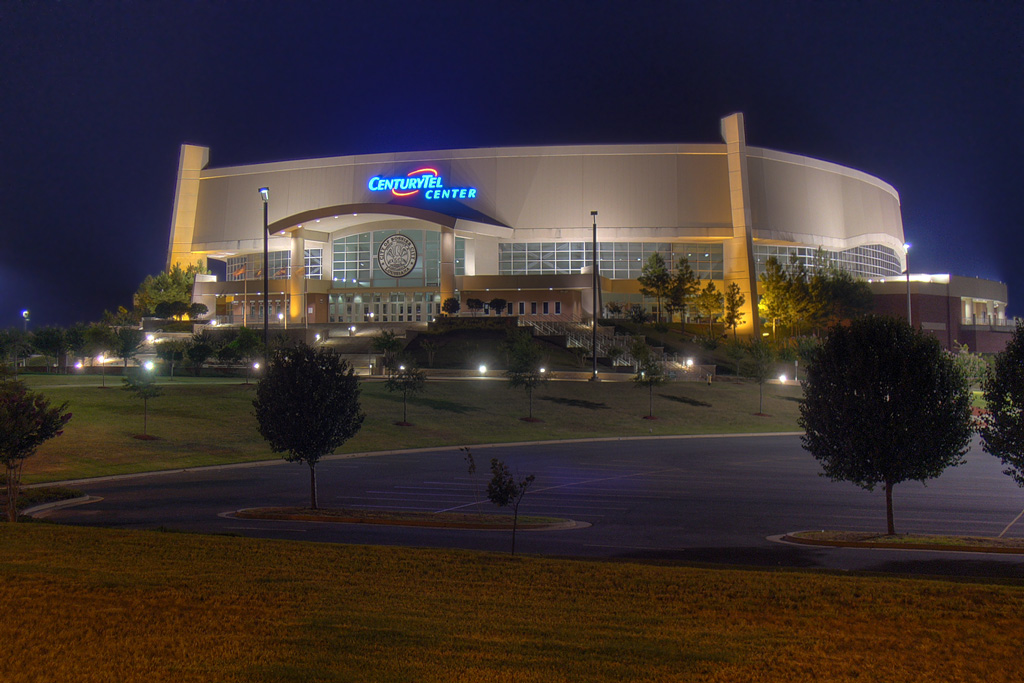
- Interactive map of Brookshire Grocery Arena
- Former names: Bossier City Arena (2000); CenturyTel Center (2000–2010); CenturyLink Center (2010–2020)
- Location: 2000 Brookshire Arena Drive; Bossier City, Louisiana 71112
- Owner: City of Bossier City
- Operator: ASM Global
- Capacity: 14,000 (concerts); 12,440 (hockey)
- Surface: Multi-surface

Construction
- Groundbreaking: March 30, 1999 (27 years ago)
- Opened: November 2, 2000 (26 years ago)
- Cost: $56.5 million ($106 million in 2025 dollars)
- Architect: AE Design Group
- Structural engineer: Walter P Moore
- General contractor: Roy Anderson Corp.

Tenants
- Bossier-Shreveport Mudbugs (CHL) (2000–2011); Bossier City/Bossier–Shreveport Battle Wings (AF2/AFL) (2001–2010); Louisiana Rouxgaroux (NAL) (2026–present)

The Brookshire Grocery Arena (formerly CenturyLink Center, CenturyTel Center, and Bossier City Arena) is a 14,000-seat multi-purpose arena, in Bossier City, Louisiana. The naming rights were purchased by the company Brookshire Grocery Group of Tyler, Texas in 2021.

== History ==
Opened in 2000 during the administration of then Bossier City Mayor George Dement, the center is among several projects financed in part from revenues derived from three casinos in the city.

The center was home to the Bossier–Shreveport Battle Wings AFL team and the Bossier-Shreveport Mudbugs CHL team.

It hosted the Southland Conference men's basketball tournament in 2001. In 2011, the CenturyLink Center with the Louisiana Tech Lady Techsters hosted 1st and 2nd-round games for the NCAA women's basketball tournament including the first two games of eventual champion Texas A&M.

UFC 37: High Impact was a mixed martial arts event held by the Ultimate Fighting Championship at the CenturyTel Center in Bossier City, Louisiana on May 10, 2002.

On September 28, 2002, the NHL came to the arena, for a pre-season game, between the Nashville Predators and Atlanta Thrashers.

On January 14, 2007, the CHL All-Star game was played at the arena, for the first time ever, hosted by the Mudbugs.

On October 24, 2014, CLC held an NBA preseason game between the New Orleans Pelicans and Dallas Mavericks.

On October 1, 2016, CLC held another NBA preseason game between the New Orleans Pelicans and Dallas Mavericks.

On September 29, 2023, Brookshire Grocery Arena was the site of the relaunch of the Ringling Brothers & Barnum and Bailey Circus after a six-year hiatus

On December 8, 2024, the arena held an NCAA women's basketball game between the LSU Tigers and the Grambling State Tigers. The event was Mikaylah Williams' homecoming, and her high school number was retired during the pre-game ceremony. 8,299 people attended the game.

On August 8, 2025, the arena was named as the new home of the Louisiana Rouxgaroux of the National Arena League.

== Concert history ==
A list of notable concerts held in the arena
Date	Artist	Tour	Supporting act(s)	Attendance	Revenue	Notes
November 21, 2000	Styx	Together in 2000 Tour	REO Speedwagon, Survivor	—N/a		—N/a
November 25, 2000	Creed	Human Clay Tour	Sevendust, Finger Eleven	—N/a		—N/a
December 2, 2000	Elton John	Medusa Tour	—N/a			—N/a
March 8, 2002	Kid Rock	Cocky Tour				—N/a
July 18, 2002	Britney Spears	Dream Within a Dream Tour	O-Town	12,232	$749,181	—N/a
November 16, 2002	Cher	Living Proof: The Farewell Tour	Cyndi Lauper	11,610	$771,806	—N/a
April 25, 2003	ZZ Top	Beer Drinkers and Hell Raisers Tour	Ted Nugent	6,300 / 7,500	$248,850	—N/a
March 4, 2004	Kid Rock	Rock N' Roll Pain Train Tour	—N/a			—N/a
February 5, 2005	Cher	Living Proof: The Farewell Tour	Village People	9,323 / 12,397	$508,529	—N/a
March 8, 2006	Nickelback	All the Right Reasons Tour	Trapt, Chevelle	—N/a		—N/a
March 3, 2007	Justin Timberlake	FutureSex/LoveShow	—N/a			—N/a
November 15, 2007	Hannah Montana & Miley Cyrus	Best of Both Worlds Tour	Jonas Brothers	—N/a		—N/a
February 19, 2008	Kid Rock	Rock N' Roll Revival Tour	Rev Run, Peter Wolfe	—N/a		—N/a
April 13, 2009	Nickelback	Dark Horse Tour	Seether, Saving Abel	—N/a		—N/a
August 4, 2009	Journey	Revelation Tour				—N/a
September 10, 2009	Taylor Swift	Fearless Tour	Gloriana; Kellie Pickler	—N/a		—N/a
September 19, 2009	Britney Spears	The Circus Starring Britney Spears	Kristinia DeBarge	10,240	$610,818	—N/a
February 13, 2010	Martina McBride; Trace Adkins	Shine All Night Tour	—N/a			—N/a
February 8, 2011	Kid Rock	Born Free Tour	—N/a			—N/a
September 20, 2011	Taylor Swift	Speak Now World Tour	Needtobreathe	11,510	$728,546	—N/a
February 13, 2013	Kid Rock	Rebel Soul Tour	—N/a			
March 8, 2014	Luke Bryan	That's My Kind of Night Tour	Lee Brice; Cole Swindell	12,292	$678,063	
March 22, 2014	Elton John	Follow the Yellow Brick Road Tour	—N/a	—N/a		
November 15, 2014	Cher	Dressed to Kill Tour	Cancelled due to viral infection			
March 20, 2015	Miranda Lambert	Platinum Tour	Justin Moore; Danielle Bradbery	—N/a		
May 20, 2015	Taylor Swift	The 1989 World Tour	Vance Joy	12,459	$1,458,197	This show served as the opening night of the tour's North American leg.
July 29, 2015	Eagles	History of the Eagles – Live in Concert	—N/a			—N/a
March 12, 2016	Luke Bryan	Kill the Lights Tour	Little Big Town; Dustin Lynch	—N/a		—N/a
April 22, 2016	Carrie Underwood	Storyteller Tour: Stories in the Round	Easton Corbin; The Swon Brothers	10,883	$737,228	—N/a
March 12, 2017	Miranda Lambert	Highway Vagabond Tour	Old Dominion	—N/a		—N/a
July 9, 2017	Journey	North American Tour	Asia			—N/a
July 15, 2017	Paul McCartney	One on One	—N/a			—N/a
April 22, 2018	Foo Fighters	Concrete and Gold Tour	The Struts	—N/a		—N/a
March 16, 2019	P!nk	Beautiful Trauma World Tour	Julia Michaels; KidCutUp	—N/a		—N/a
September 7, 2019	KISS	End of the Road World Tour	David Garibaldi	—N/a		—N/a
October 5, 2019	Miranda Lambert	Roadside Bars & Pink Guitars Tour	Maren Morris; Pistol Annies; Tenille Townes	—N/a		
March 10, 2020	Cher	Here We Go Again Tour	Nile Rodgers; CHIC	—	—	After this show, the remaining dates of the tour were postponed to later in the year due to COVID-19.
August 29, 2020	Journey	2020 Tour	Pretenders	—	—	This show was canceled due to COVID-19.
September 30, 2020	Def Leppard	20/20 Vision Tour	ZZ Top	—	—	—N/a
October 1, 2020	Luke Bryan	Proud to Be Right Here Tour	Morgan Wallen; Runaway June	—	—	—N/a
February 19, 2023	Journey	Freedom Tour	Toto			
October 17, 2025	Benson Boone	American Heart World Tour		—	—	

== See also ==
- List of music venues

Preceded by First arena	Home of the Bossier–Shreveport Battle Wings; 2001–2010	Succeeded by New Orleans Arena as New Orleans VooDoo
Preceded by MGM Grand Garden Arena	Ultimate Fighting Championship venue UFC 37	Succeeded by Bellagio
