= Tommy Armstrong Jr. =

American football player (born 1993)

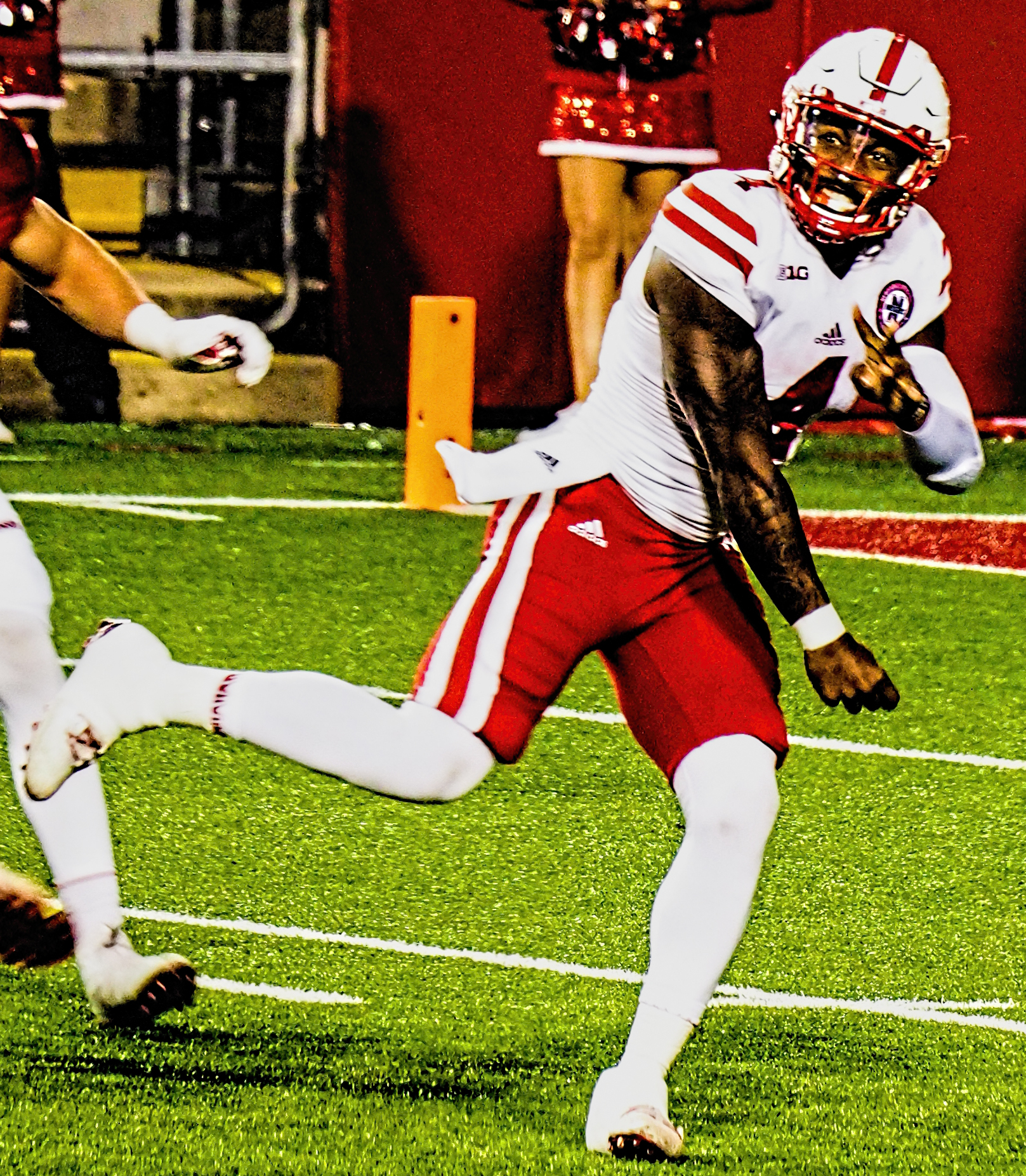
- Armstrong with Nebraska in 2016

Profile
- Position: Quarterback

Personal information
- Born: November 8, 1993 (age 33); Gulfport, Mississippi, U.S.
- Listed height: 6 ft 1 in (1.85 m)
- Listed weight: 220 lb (100 kg)

Career information
- High school: Steele (Cibolo, Texas)
- College: Nebraska
- NFL draft: 2017: undrafted

Career history
- Minnesota Vikings (2017)*; Your Call Football (2018); Salt Lake Stallions (2019)*; Nebraska Danger (2019); Sioux Falls Storm (2020–2022); Omaha Beef (2023–2025)
- * Offseason or practice squad member only

Awards and highlights
- NAL champion (2024); NAL MVP (2024); CIF champion (2023); Champions Bowl VIII MVP; IFL Offensive Rookie of the Year (2019); IFL Rushing Yards Leader (2019); CIF Rushing Touchdown Leader (2023)

Tommy Armstrong Jr. (born November 8, 1993) is an American former football quarterback. He played college football as a quarterback for Nebraska and had a successful professional career in indoor American football.

== Early life ==
Armstrong was born in Gulfport, Mississippi. Due to the effects of Hurricane Katrina along the Mississippi Gulf Coast in the summer of 2005, Armstrong evacuated to San Antonio, Texas to live with his younger brother and father.

Armstrong attended Steele High School in Cibolo, Texas, a suburb 15 miles northeast of San Antonio. As a senior, he passed for 1,945 yards with 29 touchdowns with two interceptions and rushed for 1,281 yards and 16 touchdowns. He was a four-star recruit by Scout.com. He committed to the University of Nebraska–Lincoln to play college football.

== College career ==
Armstrong redshirted his first year at Nebraska in 2012. He started his redshirt freshman year in 2013 as the backup to Taylor Martinez. Armstrong would end up starting eight games due to injuries to Martinez. Although he started those games, he mostly split time with Ron Kellogg. For the season, he completed 68 of 131 passes for 966 yards, with nine touchdowns and eight interceptions. He also rushed for 202 yards with two touchdowns. Armstrong started all 13 games as a sophomore in 2014. He completed 184 of 345 passes for 2,695 yards, 22 touchdowns and 12 interceptions and also rushed for 705 yards with six touchdowns. Armstrong returned as the starter his junior year in 2015. He completed 202 of 402 passes for 3,030 yards, 22 touchdowns and 16 interceptions. He also rushed for 400 yards and seven touchdowns. He returned as the starter for his senior season in 2016, starting 11 of the 13 games and missing two games with injuries. He completed 151 of 294 passes for 2,180 yards, 14 touchdowns and eight interceptions. He also rushed for 604 yards and eight touchdowns.

=== Career statistics ===
Season	Team	Games			Passing							Rushing			
Season	Team	GP	GS	Record	Cmp	Att	Pct	Yds	TD	Int	Rtg	Att	Yds	Avg	TD
2012	Nebraska	0	0	—	(redshirt) Redshirted										
2013	Nebraska	9	7	7–1	68	131	51.9	996	9	8	124.3	67	202	3.0	2
2014	Nebraska	13	13	9–4	184	345	53.3	2,695	22	12	133.0	145	705	4.9	6
2015	Nebraska	12	12	6–6	222	402	55.2	3,030	22	16	128.6	98	400	4.1	7
2016	Nebraska	11	11	8–3	151	294	51.4	2,180	14	8	123.9	113	512	4.5	8
Totals		45	43	30–13	625	1,172	53.3	8,871	67	44	128.3	423	1,819	4.3	23

=== Nebraska rankings ===
- Career passing Yards, 1st (8,871 yards)
- Career passing completions, 1st (625 completions)
- Career touchdown passes, 1st (67 touchdowns)
- Career total offense, 1st (10,690 yards)
- Career 250-yard passing games, 1st (14 games)
- Career 300-yard total offense games, 1st (11 games)
- Season passing yards, 3rd/5th (3,030 yards in 2015, 2,695 yards in 2014)
- Season passing touchdowns, 4th (22 TDs in both 2014 and 2015)
- Season passing completions, 5th (222 completions, 2015)
- Season total offense, 3rd/4th (3,430 yards in 2015, 3,400 yards in 2014)
- Season 300-yard passing Games, 2nd (4, 2015)
- Season 250-yard passing Games, 1st-tied (8, 2015)
- Season 300-yard total Offense Games, 1st-tied (6, 2015)

=== College honors, awards, and records ===
- Davey O'Brien Award Watch List (2016)
- Maxwell Award Watch List (2016)
- Team Captain (2015)
- Foster Farms Bowl Offensive MVP (2015 vs. UCLA)
- Rose Bowl Big Ten Player of the Week (Fresno State, 2016)
- Big Ten Offensive Player of the Week (vs. Southern Miss, vs. Michigan State, 2015, at Northwestern, 2016)
- Maxwell Award Watch List (2015)
- Manning Award Watch List (2015)
- Earl Campbell Tyler Rose Award Watch List (2015)
- Honorable-Mention Big Ten All-Freshman Team (BTN, 2013)
- Big Ten Freshman of the Week (vs. Michigan, 2013)
- Longest Pass in Nebraska History and NCAA Bowl History (99 yards vs. Georgia)
- Nebraska Scholar-Athlete Honor Roll (Fall, 2012)
- Nebraska Junior Record for Passing Yards in a Season
- Nebraska Sophomore Record Holder – passing yards, passing touchdowns, total offense
- Nebraska Bowl Game Record Holder – passing yards, passing touchdowns, passing completions, passing attempts, total offense (2014 Holiday Bowl vs. the University of Southern California)
- 2016 Tom Novak Trophy
- Brook Berringer Citizenship Team (2016)
- Tom Osborne Citizenship Team (2016)

== Professional career ==
=== Minnesota Vikings ===
As a dual-threat quarterback, Armstrong sought to join the National Football League (NFL) by changing positions. Prior to the NFL draft, Armstrong converted positions to wide receiver. Armstrong was not invited to the NFL Combine and, despite attracting interest during Nebraska's pro day, was not drafted in the 2017 NFL draft. Armstrong was subsequently given a tryout with the Minnesota Vikings as a running back, but was later asked to sign as a safety, a defensive position and one he had not played since high school. Armstrong was not signed by Minnesota following his early May tryout but later signed with the Vikings as a safety on May 30, 2017. He was waived by the Vikings on June 16, 2017.

=== Your Call Football ===
In May 2018, Armstrong signed with Your Call Football.

=== Salt Lake Stallions ===
On September 9, 2018, Armstrong announced via his Twitter account that he had signed with the Salt Lake Stallions of the Alliance of American Football for the 2019 season. However, he went unselected in the 2019 AAF QB Draft.

=== Nebraska Danger ===
On January 2, 2019, it was announced that Armstrong had signed with the Nebraska Danger, an Indoor Football League team based in Grand Island, Nebraska. Armstrong's first game was a victory, in which he threw 8 completions on 12 attempts for 158 yards and four touchdowns, while also rushing for 23 yards and another score on three attempts. Armstrong was named the IFL Offensive Player of the Week for his performance in his professional debut. Armstrong played in all 14 regular season games for the Danger, leading them to a playoff berth, finishing with a 7–7 record in 5th place. Armstrong completed 150 out of 251 passes, for 1,799 yards and 37 touchdowns against nine interceptions, was the league leader in rushing yards and rushing touchdowns, with 137 attempts for 720 yards and 26 scores (both single season team records), and served as the holder for field goals and extra points. On June 21, 2019, Armstrong led the Danger to a 45-40 playoff win over the Green Bay Blizzard before suffering a 62–45 defeat at the hands of the Arizona Rattlers. During the playoffs, Armstrong completed 23 of 35 passes for 189 yards and six touchdowns against two interceptions, while also rushing for 63 yards and four more scores. Armstrong was named the Indoor Football League Offensive Rookie of the Year for 2019.

=== Sioux Falls Storm ===
On October 17, 2019, Armstrong signed with the Sioux Falls Storm.

=== Omaha Beef ===
For the 2023 season, Armstrong signed with the Omaha Beef. He would lead the Beef to their second league title in three seasons and their first perfect season in franchise history. On November 10, 2023, Armstrong re-signed with the Beef for their first season in the National Arena League (NAL). During the 2024 NAL season, Armstrong again lead the Beef to an undefeated championship season, being named NAL Player of the Year.

Armstrong announced his retirement from football on August 7, 2024, citing impending surgeries. After sitting out the 2025 NAL regular season, Armstrong came out of retirement to sign with the Beef ahead of their 2025 playoff game, helping the Beef return to their fifth championship game appearance in five years. He was inducted into the Omaha Beef's hall of fame in May 2026.

== Coaching career ==
In 2022, Armstrong became the offensive coordinator at Lincoln North Star High School.
