= Denny Price =

American basketball player and coach

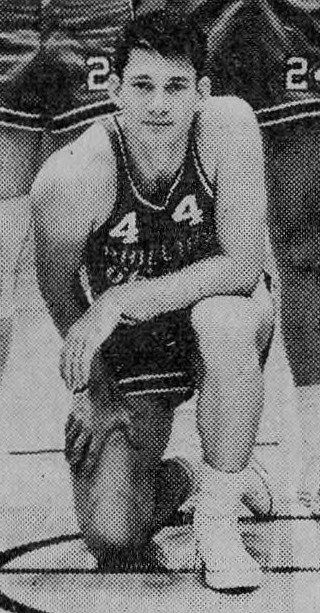
- Price, circa 1963

Personal information
- Born: January 28, 1938 Norman, Oklahoma, U.S.
- Died: July 7, 2000 (aged 62) Enid, Oklahoma, U.S.
- Listed height: 6 ft 1 in (1.85 m)

Career information
- High school: Norman (Norman, Oklahoma)
- College: Oklahoma (1957–1960)
- NBA draft: 1960: undrafted
- Position: Guard
- Coaching career: 1968–2000

Career history

Playing
- ?–1965: Phillips 66ers

Coaching
- 1968–1969: Shawnee HS
- 1969–1973: Oklahoma (assistant)
- 1973–1975: Phoenix Suns (assistant)
- 1975–1979: Sam Houston State
- 1986–1993: Phillips
- 1996–1998: Phillips (women)
- 2000: Oklahoma Storm

Career highlights
- 2× AAU All-American (1962, 1963)

William Dennis "Denny" Price (January 28, 1938 – July 7, 2000) was an American basketball player and coach. He played for the University of Oklahoma (OU) and the Phillips 66ers. He then embarked on a coaching career at Oklahoma, the Phoenix Suns and Sam Houston State. He was the father of former National Basketball Association (NBA) players Mark and Brent Price.

Born and raised in Norman, Oklahoma, Price came to the Oklahoma Sooners out of Norman High School to play for coach Doyle Parrack. He played both baseball and basketball there, earning All-Big Eight Conference honors in both. After graduating from OU, Price played five seasons for the Phillips 66ers of the Amateur Athletic Union (AAU), earning All-American honors in 1962 and 1963.

Following his playing career, Price turned to coaching, first at Shawnee High School in Oklahoma, then accepting an assistant coaching position at his alma mater under head coach John MacLeod in 1969. When MacLeod left the Sooners to become coach of the National Basketball Association's expansion Phoenix Suns in 1973, Price followed to become the franchise's first assistant coach. After two seasons, Price realized his goal of becoming a head coach, taking the head coaching position at Sam Houston State University in 1975. He resigned after four seasons with a record of 35–71.

Price spent several years in business before accepting an offer to become head men's coach and athletic director at Phillips University in Enid, Oklahoma, in 1986. He retired from the men's team in 1993, but took on coaching the women's team when the previous coach was fired during the 1995–96 season, holding this role until the school closed in 1998. His last coaching job came as coach of the Oklahoma Storm of the United States Basketball League (USBL) in 2000.

Price died on July 7, 2000, of a heart attack while playing basketball with his sons.
