= Geronimo Motor Company =

Defunct American motor vehicle manufacturer

Geronimo Automobile Company
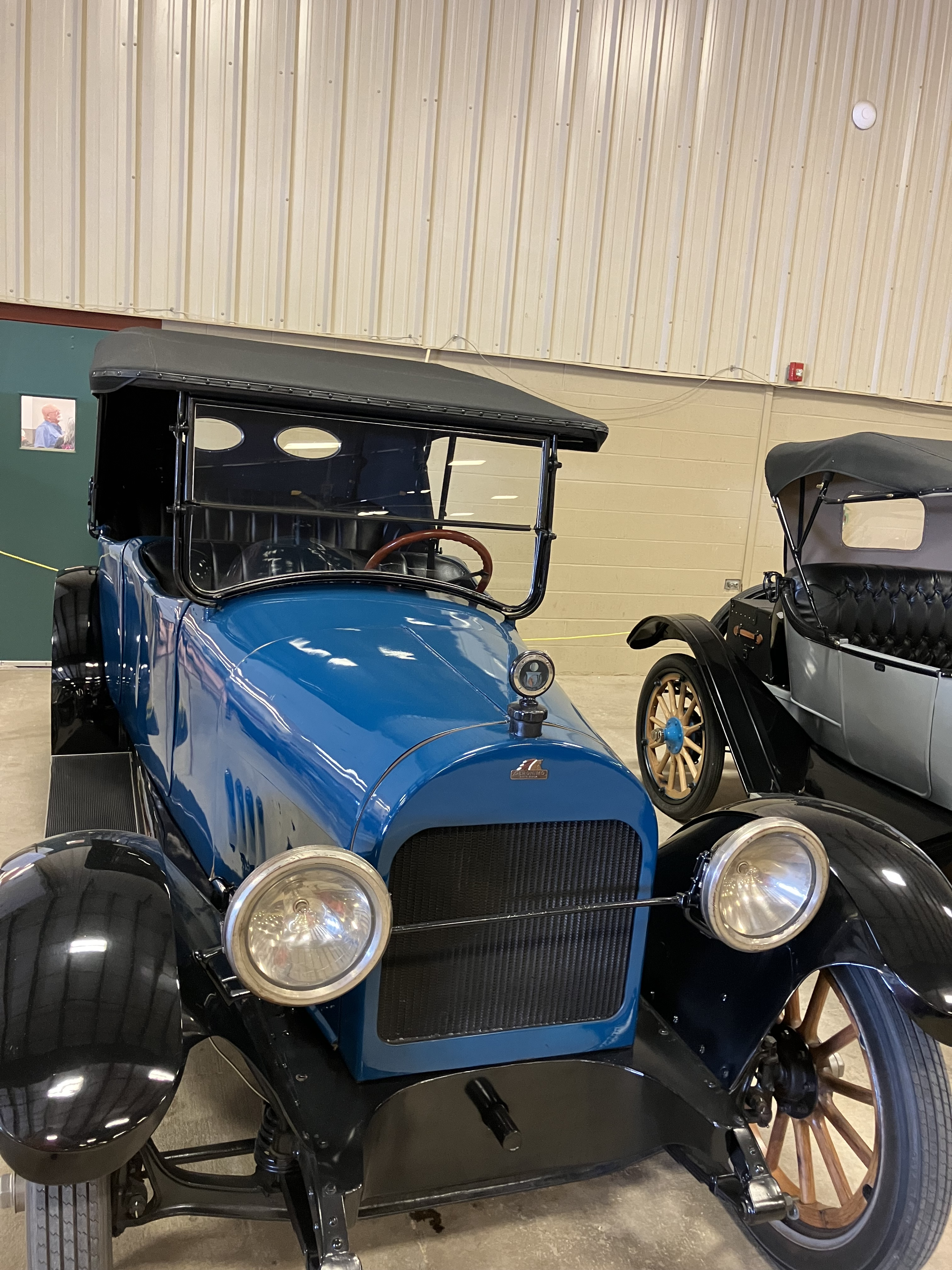
- Production output: 1917-20

Geronimo was a pioneer vintage era American automobile, built at 409 South Grand in Enid, Oklahoma, between 1917 and 1920. It was what would today be called an "assembled car", relying on proprietary parts from outside suppliers. In addition, the company made tractors.

== History ==
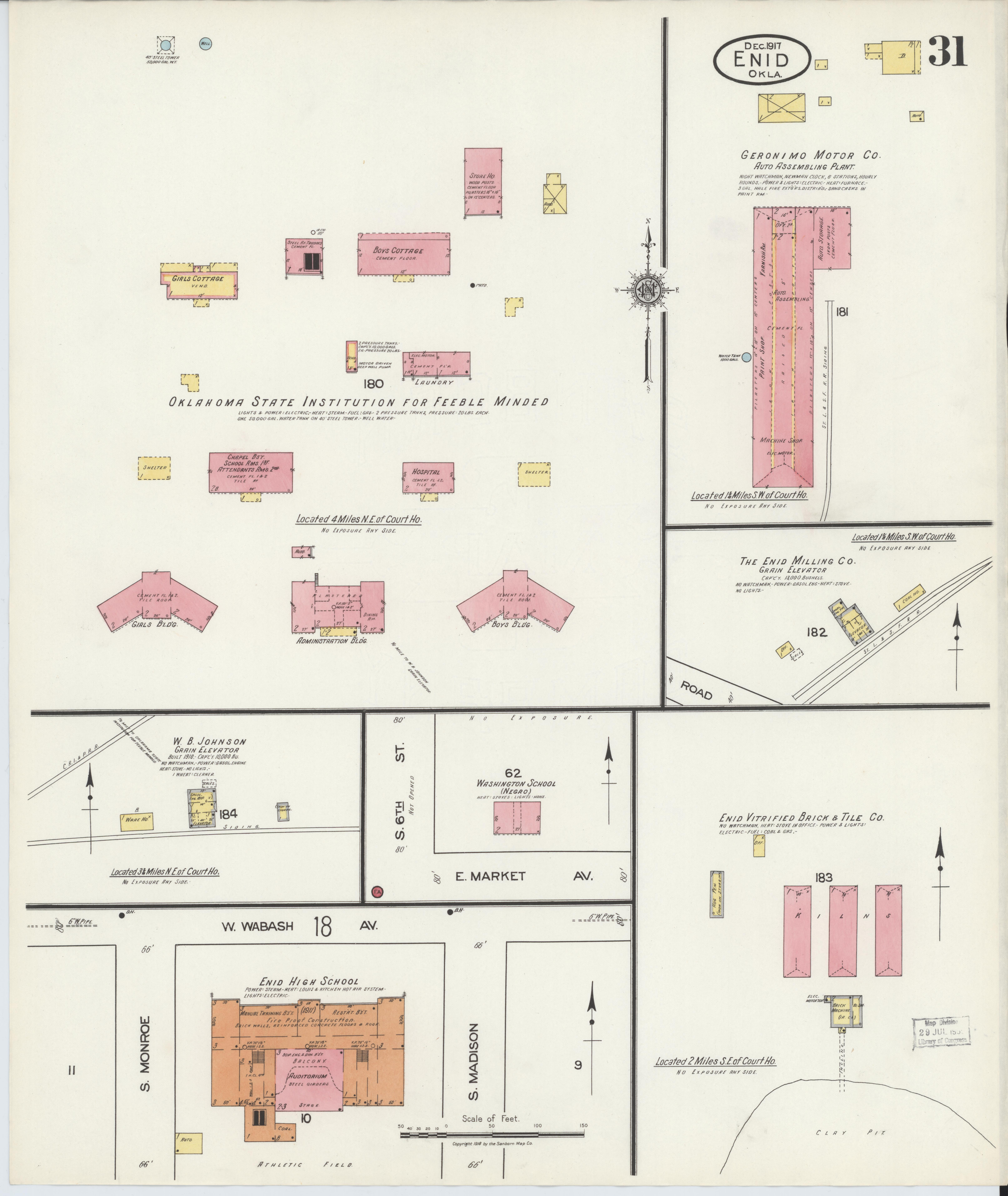
1917 Geronimo Plant at 409 South Grand in Enid, Oklahoma

The Geronimo Motor Company was founded in 1917 by William C. Allen and incorporated with a $500,000 stock sale.

The company offered two models: the 4A-40, with a 166 cu in (2.7 L) four-cylinder Lycoming of 37 hp (28 kW; 38 PS), and the 6A-45, powered by a 230 cu in (3.8 L) Rutenberg six producing a claimed 45 hp (34 kW; 46 PS), with an optional 55 hp (41 kW; 56 PS) six and a 122-inch wheelbase. One model was a roadster, the other a five-passenger tourer. Geronimo also produced cars under the marque Wing for export to France.

The cars were distributed by agencies across the Midwest, in Kansas, Nebraska, West Texas, and Oklahoma. The 4A-40 was priced at $895, the 6A-45 at $1,295. By contrast, the Cole 30 and Colt Runabout were $1,500, the Model S $700, and the high-volume Oldsmobile Runabout was $650.

Despite its price, the Geronimo proved popular enough that the company built a new 30,000 ft^{2} (2,800 m^{2}) factory on the outskirts of Enid, completed in the fall of 1917. As a result, both production and capitalization expanded, and in January 1919, the company sold another $500,000 in stock. By 1919, unit price had climbed as high as $1995, into the range of the $1750 FAL or $2,000 Enger 40. On 14 August 1920, the plant suffered a severe fire which did $250,000 in damage. Insurance only covered $65,000, and the company was forced to close.

At its peak, between 40 and a peak of 125 workers were employed, producing and selling a total of 600 cars, though production levels may have reached 1000. Only one survives, a restored example found in a field near LaCross, Kansas, in 1972. It is now owned by the Enid Region of the Antique Automobile Club of America, and is still regularly used in parades and community historical events.

Year	Production	Model	Serial number	Displacement
1917	44	4-A-40	4101 to 4145	3153 cc
1918	99	6-A-45	401 to 500	3771 cc
1919	98	6-A-45	501 to 599	3771 cc
1920	~ 70	6-A-45, 6-G-45	600 to ?	3771 cc
Sum	~ 311			

== See also ==
- List of automobile manufacturers
- List of defunct United States automobile manufacturers
