= 2000 Omaha Beef season =

- General manager: Don Igo
- Head coach: Sandy Buda
- Home stadium: Omaha Civic Auditorium; 1804 Capitol Avenue; Omaha, Nebraska 68102

Results
- Record: 8–8
- League place: 3rd
- Playoffs: Lost IPFL Semifinals 40-43 (Fire Dogs)

The 2000 Omaha Beef season was the team's inaugural season as a football franchise and first in the Indoor Professional Football League (IPFL). One of seven teams competing in the IPFL for the 2000 season. The team played their home games at the Omaha Civic Auditorium in Omaha, Nebraska.

== Schedule ==
Win Tie Loss Bye

=== Regular season ===
Week	Opponent	Results		Location
Week	Opponent	Final score	Team record	Location
1	Idaho Stallions	W 26–12	1–0	Omaha Civic Auditorium
2	at Shreveport-Bossier Bombers	L 39–44	1–1	Hirsch Memorial Coliseum
3	Portland Prowlers	L 43–23	1–2	Omaha Civic Auditorium
4	at Idaho Stallions	W 38–33	2–2	Bank of America Centre
5	Bye			
6	at Mobile Seagulls	W 39–36	3–2	Mobile Civic Center
7	Louisiana Rangers	L 33–40	3–3	Omaha Civic Auditorium
8	Shreveport-Bossier Bombers	W 28–6	4–3	Omaha Civic Auditorium
9	Bye			
10	Portland Prowlers	L 30–34	4–4	Omaha Civic Auditorium
11	at Portland Prowlers	L 54–67	4–5	Memorial Coliseum
12	Bye			
13	at Mississippi Fire Dogs	L 46–49	4–6	Omaha Civic Auditorium
14	at Idaho Stallions	W 54–47	5–6	Bank of America Centre
15	Idaho Stallions	W 59–39	6–6	Omaha Civic Auditorium
16	Mobile Seagulls	W 57–44	7–6	Omaha Civic Auditorium
17	at Louisiana Rangers	L 27–35	7–7	Rapides Parish Coliseum
18	at Portland Prowlers	L 26–40	7–8	Memorial Coliseum
19	at Mississippi Fire Dogs	W 44–38	8–8	Mississippi Coast Coliseum

=== Standings ===
1. Portland Prowlers, 11-5

2. Mississippi Fire Dogs, 11-5

3. Omaha Beef, 8-8

4. Mobile Seagulls, 8-8

5. Louisiana Rangers, 9-7

6. Idaho Stallions, 5-11

7. Shreveport-Bossier Bombers, 5-11

=== Playoffs ===
Week	Opponent	Results		Location
Week	Opponent	Final score	Team record	Location
IPFL Semifinals	at Mississippi Fire Dogs	L 40–43	–	Mississippi Coast Coliseum

== Roster ==
2000 Omaha Beef roster
Quarterbacks: -- Brad McClatchey; -- Ed Thompson; -- Troy Travis; Running backs: -- Clinton Childs; -- Calvin Jones; Abraham Hoskins Jr WR	Offensive linemen: Currently vacant; Defensive linemen: Currently vacant	Linebackers: -- Cale Good; -- Johnny Harrison; Defensive backs: -- Ralph teddy Cotton; -- Steve Lovell; -- Lamar O'Neal; -- Thomas Williams; -- Shanon Yates; Special teams: -- Craig Forman	Reserve lists: -- Orville Townsend Jr. DB (IR); Rookies in italics 13 Active, 1 Inactive
