= 2001 Omaha Beef season =

- General manager: Don Igo
- Head coach: Sandy Buda
- Home stadium: Omaha Civic Auditorium; 1804 Capitol Avenue; Omaha, Nebraska 68102

Results
- Record: 15–1
- League place: 1st
- Playoffs: Lost IPFL Championship 38-47 (Thunder Cats)

The 2001 Omaha Beef season was the team's second season as a football franchise and second in the Indoor Professional Football League (IPFL). One of five teams competing in the IPFL for the 2001 season. The team played their home games at the Omaha Civic Auditorium in Omaha, Nebraska.

== Schedule ==
Win Tie Loss Bye

=== Regular season ===
Week	Opponent	Results		Location
Week	Opponent	Final score	Team record	Location
1	St. Louis Renegades	W 61–44	1–0	Omaha Civic Auditorium
2	Bye			
3	at Trenton Lightning	W 51–41	2–0	Sovereign Bank Arena
4	Boise Stallions	W 56–27	3–0	Omaha Civic Auditorium
5	at St. Louis Renegades	W 55–47	4–0	Family Arena
6	Bye			
7	at Boise Stallions	W 57–34	5–0	Bank of America Centre
8	Tennessee ThunderCats	W 72–50	6–0	Omaha Civic Auditorium
9	at Boise Stallions	W 49–45	7–0	Bank of America Centre
10	Tennessee ThunderCats	W 56–29	8–0	Omaha Civic Auditorium
11	at Tennessee ThunderCats	W 54–32	9–0	Knoxville Civic Coliseum
12	St. Louis Renegades	W 53–42	10–0	Family Arena
13	at Tennessee ThunderCats	L 34–61	10–1	Knoxville Civic Coliseum
14	at Boise Stallions	W 35–9	11–1	Bank of America Centre
15	Boise Stallions	W 58–19	12–1	Omaha Civic Auditorium
16	at St. Louis Renegades	W 76–37	13–1	Family Arena
17	Bye			
18	at St. Louis Renegades	W 50–33	14–1	Family Arena
19	Boise Stallions	W 79–18	15–1	Omaha Civic Auditorium

=== Standings ===
1. Omaha Beef, 15-1

2. Tennessee ThunderCats, 12-4

3. Boise Stallions, 6-9

4. St. Louis Renegades, 5-11

5. Trenton Lightning, 0-16

=== Playoffs ===
Week	Opponent	Results		Location
Week	Opponent	Final score	Team record	Location
IPFL Semifinals	Tennessee ThunderCats	L 38–47	–	Omaha Civic Auditorium

== Roster ==
2001 Omaha Beef roster
Quarterbacks: -- Troy Travis; Running backs: -- Clinton Childs; -- Calvin Jones; Wide receivers: -- Quincy Kenoly	Offensive linemen: Currently vacant; Defensive linemen: -- T. J. Martin; -- Cliff Robinson	Linebackers: Currently vacant; Defensive backs: -- Pat Davis; -- Lamont Gilchrist; -- Deondre Jones; -- Yano Jones; -- Lamar O'Neal; -- Orville Townsend Jr.; -- Shanon Yates; Special teams: -- Craig Forman	Reserve lists: Currently vacant; Rookies in italics 14 Active, 0 Inactive
