= Erik Wilhelm =

American football player (born 1965)

No. 12, 4
- Position: Quarterback

Personal information
- Born: November 16, 1965 (age 60); Dayton, Ohio, U.S.
- Listed height: 6 ft 3 in (1.91 m)
- Listed weight: 217 lb (98 kg)

Career information
- High school: Lakeridge (Lake Oswego, Oregon)
- College: Oregon State (1985–1988)
- NFL draft: 1989: 3rd round, 83rd overall pick

Career history
- Cincinnati Bengals (1989–1991); Phoenix Cardinals (1992); Cincinnati Bengals (1993); Vienna Vikings (1994)*; Cincinnati Bengals (1994–1995); New York Jets (1995); Cincinnati Bengals (1996–1997); Portland Prowlers (2000); Los Angeles Avengers (2001); Tampa Bay Storm (2002)*
- * Offseason or practice squad member only

Career NFL statistics
- Passing attempts: 136
- Passing completions: 77
- Completion percentage: 56.6%
- TD–INT: 5–6
- Passing yards: 912
- Passer rating: 71.1
- Stats at Pro Football Reference

Career AFL statistics
- Comp. / Att.: 142 / 269
- Passing yards: 1,687
- TD–INT: 23–8
- Passer rating: 81.19
- Rushing TD: 1
- Stats at ArenaFan.com

Erik Bradley Wilhelm (born November 19, 1965) is an American former professional football player who was a quarterback in the National Football League (NFL) from 1989 to 1997. He played college football for four years with the Oregon State Beavers, setting a number of school passing records. Wilhelm was selected by the Cincinnati Bengals in the third round of the 1989 NFL draft. During his six-year NFL career, Wilhelm was a backup to the durable Boomer Esiason, seeing action in a total of 23 games, starting just once.

After his time in the NFL Wilhelm played arena football for the Portland Prowlers of the Indoor Professional Football League (IPFL) in 2000 and for the Los Angeles Avengers of the Arena Football League (AFL) in 2001.

== Early life ==
Wilhelm was born November 19, 1965, in Dayton, Ohio. He began playing high school football at Gladstone High School in Gladstone, Oregon, located 12 miles south of Portland. During his first three seasons the left-handed quarterback developed and emerged as a fledgling star, gaining honors as a junior in 1982 when he was named to the Class-AA Oregon All-State team.

In the summer of 1983 Wilhelm's family moved to Lake Oswego, Oregon, another Portland suburb, with Erik enrolling at Lakeridge High School for his senior year. He quickly won the role of starting quarterback there, taking over for the school's recently graduated Class-AAA All-State quarterback, Todd Beahm. The highly touted Wilhelm's collegiate options were broad and he accepted a scholarship to Oregon State University in Corvallis, Oregon, where he enrolled in the fall of 1984.

== College career ==
Throughout the 1970s and early 1980s few programs on the NCAA Division 1 landscape compared with the Oregon State Beavers' misfortune and ineptitude on the gridiron. By 1985, Erik Wilhelm's freshman year, Beaver fans had suffered through 14 straight losing seasons, compiling a mere 15 wins in the 10 seasons running from 1975 to 1984. The freshman Wilhelm was rapidly thrust into a starting role.

Early season wins against Idaho and Cal with the strong-armed Wilhelm running head coach Dave Kragthorpe's pass oriented offense had stoked hope in the team. The chimera faded, however, when the promising Wilhelm was lost for the season due to injury – an event which punctuated a brutal four game swoon which included a merciless 63–0 thrashing at the hands of the University of Southern California. It would be another freshman QB, the previously unknown Rich Gonzales, who would lead the 38-point underdog Beavers to their sensational 21–20 road victory over the mighty University of Washington in October for their third and final win of the year.

During his partial 1985 season Wilhelm completed nearly 60% of his passes, throwing for 890 yards and passed for 9 touchdowns, suffering 14 interceptions, with the team's two victories his greatest accomplishment.

Wilhelm's career as a collegiate mad bomber would begin in earnest in the sophomore 1986 campaign, when he topped a 60% completion rate and led not only the Pacific-10 Conference but the entire NCAA Division-I in attempts (470) and completions (283). Victories over Cal, Boise State, and BYU would highlight Wilhelm and OSU's 3–8 season, during which the southpaw threw a Conference best 2,871 yards. A poor ratio of just 8 touchdown passes offset by 17 interceptions would prove the main blemish on an otherwise promising year.

The 1987 season was marked by a drop in completion percentage from more than 60% to 53.4% but also by an improvement in passing touchdown efficiency, with Wilhelm connecting for 17 touchdown strikes while suffering 21 picks. Wilhelm's 226 attempts and 423 completions in support of Coach Kragthorpe's "Air Express" offense nevertheless led the Pac-10, as did his 2,736 yards gained through the air. He set a school record for single game passing yardage in an October 10 victory over the University of Akron, racking up 461 yards in the air. The team as a whole took a step backwards, however, finishing 2–9 overall and winless in Pac-10 conference action.

It was only in his senior year, 1988, that Wilhelm's skills in the West coast offense became apparent. Throwing for a career-best 2,896 yards for the year, Wilhelm topped 62% in completion percentage and tossed 18 touchdowns against just 9 interceptions. His 275 completions on 442 attempts would again lead the Pac-10 Conference, with his completion total third nationwide among Division-I quarterbacks. Wilhelm's personal improvement led to an improvement in the team's fortunes as well, with the lowly Beavers finishing 4–6–1 for the season – the best won-loss record for the school since the team's 5–6 showing in 1971.

Wilhelm would finish his time at OSU with 9,393 yards gained in the air. He continues to hold a record of dubious distinction as of 2014, the career leader for the Pac-8/Pac-10/Pac-12 Conference for interceptions thrown with 61.

== Professional career ==
Pre-draft measurables
Height	Weight	40-yard dash	10-yard split	20-yard split	20-yard shuttle	Vertical jump
6 ft 2 3/4 in (1.90 m)	209 lb (95 kg)	5.18 s	1.74 s	3.02 s	4.21 s	26.0 in (0.66 m)

=== Cincinnati Bengals (first stint) ===
Following the success of the San Francisco 49ers and their "West coast offense," the National Football League (NFL) began a move towards a more pass-centric game, thereby putting a premium on quarterback accuracy and arm strength. Standing tall at 6'3" and with impressive collegiate credentials for completion percentage and passing yards in a pro-style offense, Erik Wilhelm represented a tantalizing prospect, despite his propensity for throwing interceptions and the poor win–loss record of his team. Consequently, Wilhelm was drafted in the third round with the 83rd overall pick of the 1989 NFL draft by the NFL's Cincinnati Bengals. The draft class was topped by number 1 overall pick Troy Aikman of the UCLA Bruins, another Pac-10 quarterback. Wilhelm was the seventh quarterback selected in the draft.

The Bengals were already being led by an established NFL star, Boomer Esiason – the 1988 NFL MVP – who like Wilhelm threw the ball left-handed. Adding a left-handed backup in Wilhelm allowed the Bengals not only additional depth, but the luxury of leaving offensive line protections unchanged should Wilhelm enter the game, with the right tackle rather than the left tackle being responsible for the critical task of blindside protection on passing plays. Initially wearing the number 12, Wilhelm saw limited action backing up Esiason in 6 games during his 1989 rookie season, completing 30 of his 56 passes for 4 touchdowns, at a cost of 2 interceptions.

The durable Esiason would remain a Bengal throughout Wilhelm's initial stint with the Bengals, which ended at the end of the 1991 season. During these three years Wilhelm would start only one game, throwing no TD passes in a 1991 loss. He would end his initial tenure with the Bengals completing 66 of his 117 passes attempted in 17 game appearances, matching his four touchdown passes with four picks.

=== Phoenix Cardinals ===
For the 1992 season Wilhelm moved to the Phoenix Cardinals where he was relegated to third on the depth chart behind starter Chris Chandler and backup Timm Rosenbach, the latter another Pac-10 quarterback selected in the 1989 draft.

=== Cincinnati Bengals (second stint) ===
Following his unsuccessful time in Phoenix, Wilhelm returned to the Bengals for the 1993 season, beginning the second of his three stints on that team. Wilhelm threw just 6 passes in mop-up duty in two NFL games during the 1993 and 1994 seasons, completing 4 of these for 63 yards.

=== New York Jets ===
In 1995 Wilhelm moved again, this time to the New York Jets, where he failed to make a single game appearance.

=== Cincinnati Bengals (third stint) ===
A third and final stint in Cincinnati followed in 1996 and 1997, with Wilhelm seeing action as a reserve in just 3 games, going 7-for-13 with 1 touchdown pass and 2 interceptions. He failed to make the team in 1998, thus ending his NFL career having made but a single start, throwing for 912 yards and 5 touchdowns in 22 games, finishing with an NFL quarterback rating of 71.1.

=== Portland Prowlers ===
Wilhelm still aspired to return to the National Football League, believing he still had a sufficient range of skills to play at that level, and for the next three years worked out with a view to returning to the professional game, playing flag football to stay in shape and regularly throwing balls to friend Chad Carlson, a former player in the Canadian Football League. Carlson, who formerly played wide receiver for the short-lived Portland Forest Dragons of the Arena Football League (AFL), learned of a franchise coming to Portland as part of the new Indoor Professional Football League (IPFL) and he persuaded Wilhelm to join him in trying out for the team.

In 2000 Wilhelm joined the Portland Prowlers of the IPFL as the team's starting quarterback. Wilhelm found the camaraderie of the IPFL fulfilling, if not financially lucrative, noting in a 2000 interview:

"I'm enjoying it tremendously because it's guys coming together, bonding and going for a common goal to win games and to learn an offense together, to practice together, to get beat up by the other team. Whether you have success or fail, you do it together. There's nothing that can really replace something like that. It's why guys play football. No matter if it's the NFL and you're getting paid a whole bunch of money or this league where you're gettin' beer and pizza money."

Wilhelm led the Prowlers to an 11–5 record and the 2000 IPFL Championship game, in the process setting the league record for touchdown passes in a single season at 62. Wilhelm's squad lost the championship in a shootout, 53–48, falling victim to quarterback John Fourcade and the Mississippi Fire Dogs at Portland's Memorial Coliseum.

=== Los Angeles Avengers ===
Wilhelm moved to the rival Arena Football League for the 2001 season, joining the AFL's Los Angeles Avengers. In Los Angeles, Wilhelm led the Avengers to a 5–9 record in the 2001 Arena Football League season, missing the playoffs. The season would mark the end of Wilhelm's professional football career.

=== Tampa Bay Storm ===
During the 2002 AFL season, Wilhelm signed with the Tampa Bay Storm but was put on the refused to report list and was released.

== Career statistics ==
=== NFL ===
Year	Team	Games			Passing								Rushing			
Year	Team	GP	GS	Rec	Comp	Att	Pct	Yards	Avg	TD	Int	Rate	Att	Yards	Avg	TD
1989	Cincinnati	6	0	0–0–0	30	56	53.6	425	7.6	4	2	87.3	6	30	5.0	0
1990	Cincinnati	7	0	0–0–0	12	19	63.2	117	6.2	0	0	80.4	6	6	1.0	0
1991	Cincinnati	4	1	0–1–0	24	42	57.1	217	5.2	0	2	51.4	1	9	9.0	0
1992	Phoenix	DNP														
1993	Cincinnati	1	0	0–0–0	4	6	66.7	63	10.5	0	0	101.4	0	0	0.0	0
1994	Cincinnati	1	0	0–0–0	0	0	0.0	0	0.0	0	0	0.0	0	0	0.0	0
1995	New York Jets	DNP														
1996	Cincinnati	3	0	0–0–0	7	13	53.8	90	6.9	1	2	30.0	6	24	4.0	0
Career		22	1	0–1–0	77	136	56.6	912	6.7	5	6	71.1	19	69	3.6	0

=== AFL ===
Year	Team	Games			Passing								Rushing			
Year	Team	GP	GS	Rec	Att	Comp	Pct	Yards	Avg	TD	Int	Rate	Att	Yards	Avg	TD
2001	Los Angeles	14	14	5–9–0	269	142	52.8	1,687	6.3	23	8	88.3	13	2	0.2	1
Career		14	14	5–9–0	269	142	52.8	1,687	6.3	23	8	88.3	13	2	0.2	1

=== College ===
Year	Team	Games	Passing								Rushing			
Year	Team	GP	Comp	Att	Pct	Yards	Avg	TD	Int	Rate	Att	Yards	Avg	TD
1985	Oregon State	–	86	145	59.3	890	6.1	9	14	112.0	23	−32	−1.4	0
1986	Oregon State	11	283	470	60.2	2,871	6.1	8	17	109.9	75	−206	−2.7	1
1987	Oregon State	11	226	423	53.4	2,736	6.5	17	21	111.1	41	−123	−3.0	0
1988	Oregon State	11	275	422	62.2	2,896	6.6	18	9	126.6	70	30	0.4	2
Career		33	870	1,480	58.8	9,393	6.3	52	61	115.4	209	-331	-1.6	3

== Personal life ==
After being cut from the NFL, Wilhelm returned to the Pacific Northwest, settling in the southwest Washington city of Vancouver, just north of Portland. He worked in partnership with his mother as a residential property manager there.

== See also ==
- History of Oregon State Beavers football
