= Winston-Salem Energy =

- Founded: 2001
- Folded: 2002
- League: NIFL (2002)
- Conference: Atlantic (2002)
- Division: Northern (2002)
- Team history: Winston-Salem Energy (2002)
- Based in: Winston-Salem, North Carolina
- Arena: Lawrence Joel Veterans Memorial Coliseum
- Owner: David Graham
- Championships: 0
- Playoff berths: 0

The Winston-Salem Energy was an indoor football team based in Winston-Salem, North Carolina. The Energy competed in the National Indoor Football League (NIFL), as a member of the league's Atlantic Conference Northern Division. The team was owned by David Graham. The club folded following their only season in 2002. Winston-Salem was without an NIFL team until 2007, with the arrival of the Winston-Salem Wildcats.

== Season-By-Season ==
Energy's original logo

Season records
Season	W	L	T	Finish	Playoff results
2002	5	8	0	3rd AC Northern	--

== 2002 NIFL Winston-Salem Schedule ==
3/09 BYE

3/16 H Ohio Valley Greyhounds Ohio Valley no showed for the game.

3/23 BYE

3/30 H Ohio Valley Greyhounds 40-43 L

4/06 H Mississippi Fire Dogs 59-48 W

4/13 A Tennessee ThunderCats 41-51 L

4/20 H River City Renegades 63-8 W

4/27 A Mississippi Fire Dogs 32-43 L

5/4 H Tennessee ThunderCats 59-54 W

5/11 A Houma Bayou Bucks 50-21 L

5/18 H Houma Bayou Bucks 61-31 W

5/26 BYE

6/01 H Louisiana Rangers 65-69 L

6/08 BYE

6/15 A Louisiana Rangers 51-59 L

6/22 A River City Renegades 26-41 L

6/29 A Ohio Valley Greyhounds 42-86 L

7/06 A Tupelo FireAnts 38-35 W
