= Houma Bayou Bucks =

The Houma Bayou Bucks was a team in the National Indoor Football League (NIFL). The Bayou Bucks were officially announced as a team on December 19, 2001. The team's first GM was Travis Carrell and their first head coach was Jack Phillips Jr.

The Bayou Bucks competed in the NIFL from 2002 through the 2004 seasons, playing their home games at the Houma Terrebonne Civic Center in Houma, Louisiana. The team colors were: Gold, Green, and White. After the 2004 NIFL season, Sudo Properties, Inc., parent company of the Bayou Bucks football team, had filed a lawsuit in federal court against the Terrebonne Parish Consolidated Government (TPCG). The suit accuses TPCG of illegal acts spanning a three-year period. Following the lawsuit, the franchise folded.

== Season-by-season overall records ==

Season records
Season	W	L	T	Finish	Playoff results
2002	5	9	0	3rd AC Southern	–
2003	10	5	0	2nd AC Southern	Lost Round 1 (Lake Charles)
2004	11	3	0	1st AC Southern	Lost Round 1 (Lexington)
Totals	26	17	0	(including playoffs)	

== 2002 Houma Bayou Bucks schedule ==
March 23 Austin Knights at Houma Bayou Bucks 40–39

March 30 Houma Bayou Bucks at Oklahoma Crude 29–31

April 5 Houma Bayou Bucks at Louisiana Rangers 64–81

April 12 bye

April 20 Tupelo FireAnts at Houma Bayou Bucks 24–44

April 27 Houma Bayou Bucks at Lake Charles Land Sharks 16–37

May 5 Mississippi Fire Dogs at Houma Bayou Bucks 7–26

May 11 Winston-Salem Energy at Houma Bayou Bucks – cancelled in 3rd Qtr. due to fight

May 18 Houma Bayou Bucks at Winston-Salem Energy 31–61

May 25 Louisiana Rangers at Houma Bayou Bucks 50–43

June 1 Houma Bayou Bucks at Mississippi Fire Dogs 31–22

June 8 Houma Bayou Bucks at Austin Knights 53–42

June 15 bye

June 22 Oklahoma Crude at Houma Bayou Bucks 15–58

June 29 Lake Charles Land Sharks at Houma Bayou Bucks 42–31

July 6 Houma Bayou Bucks at Austin Knights 32–40

== 2003 Houma Bayou Bucks schedule ==
March 15 bye

March 22 Myrtle Beach Stingrays at Houma Bayou Bucks 14–29

March 29 Oklahoma Crude at Houma Bayou Bucks 18–29

April 5 Houma Bayou Bucks at Utah Warriors 61–36

April 12 Houma Bayou Bucks at Beaumont Drillers 54–44

April 19 Houma Bayou Bucks at Austin Rockers 44–33

April 26 Houma Bayou Bucks at Lake Charles Land Sharks 35–48

May 4 Tupelo FireAnts at Houma Bayou Bucks 26–47

May 10 Lake Charles Land Sharks at Houma Bayou Bucks 21–28

May 17 Houma Bayou Bucks at Tupelo FireAnts 49–43

May 24 Beaumont Drillers at Houma Bayou Bucks 40–6

May 31 Houma Bayou Bucks at Myrtle Beach Stingrays 36–30

June 7 Houma Bayou Bucks at Oklahoma Crude 36–39

June 14 Austin Rockers at Houma Bayou Bucks 39–42

June 21 bye

June 28 Evansville BlueCats at Houma Bayou Bucks 6–55

July 5 bye

NIFL playoffs

July 12 Houma Bayou Bucks at Lake Charles Land Sharks 19–44

== 2004 Houma Bayou Bucks schedule ==
March 12 Houma Bayou Bucks at Tupelo FireAnts 50–58

March 20 Lake Charles Land Sharks at Houma Bayou Bucks 13–43

April 3 Beaumont Drillers at Houma Bayou Bucks 43–52

April 10 Wichita Falls Thunder at Houma Bayou Bucks 51–66

April 17 Houma Bayou Bucks at Lake Charles Land Sharks 39–33

April 24 bye

May 1 Tupelo FireAnts at Houma Bayou Bucks 55–84

May 8 Houma Bayou Bucks at Beaumont Drillers 51–40

May 15 Houma Bayou Bucks at Lake Charles Land Sharks 31–27

May 22 Evansville BlueCats at Houma Bayou Bucks 51–49

May 28 Houma Bayou Bucks at Tupelo FireAnts 60–58

June 6 bye

June 12 Beaumont Drillers at Houma Bayou Bucks 66–74

June 19 Waco Marshals at Houma Bayou Bucks 0–74 (Largest margin of defeat in a game with the other team not scoring a point in 2004, in the National Indoor Football League.)

June 26 Oklahoma Crude at Houma Bayou Bucks 33–84

July 2 Houma Bayou Bucks at Tupelo FireAnts 50–54

NIFL Conference Semi-finals

July 16 Houma Bayou Bucks at Lexington Horsemen 63–70
