= Shreveport-Bossier Bombers =

Shreveport-Bossier Bombers
Founded	2000
Arena	Hirsch Memorial Coliseum
Based in	Shreveport, Louisiana
Colors	Blue and black
League	Indoor Professional Football League
Head coach	Edward Jenkins

The Shreveport-Bossier Bombers were an indoor football team of the Indoor Professional Football League (IPFL) in 2000. The Bombers, based out of Shreveport, LA/Bossier City, LA, were one of four IPFL expansion teams for that season. They played their games in the Hirsch Memorial Coliseum in Shreveport. The Bombers owner was Don Rafferty and Matt Ingram was the general manager of the team.

On August 21, 1999, the IPFL announced two new expansion teams in Omaha and Shreveport. November 9, 1999, Shreveport introduces the team name (Bombers) and the logo. And on February 10, 2000, the Bombers named 24-year-old Edward Jenkins as their head coach for their only season in the IPFL. Jenkins resigned as an assistant coach at Colby College, a Division III school in Waterville, Maine, to take over the helm of the Bombers. Later on, Dave Lockwoodand was named as the Bombers defensive coordinator.

Some notable Shreveport-Bossier Bombers were QB's Chris Milwee and Steve Fill, DB's Chris Samson and Anthony Montgomery, linemen Roman Blake, Willie McCray, and Alex "Monster" Mash, WR Carson Thomas and PK's Shane Thomas and Sam Corrigan. Even Head Coach Ed Jenkins, for the last home game of the season, was forced into the QB role after Chris Milwee's finger injury.

The Bombers experienced the least success of the four expansion teams. The team averaged only 28 points per game and was frequently held to less than 15 points. The team enjoyed only one road victory, a 27-15 win over the Mobile Seagulls. An early six-game losing streak took them out of the playoff race, and their league-worst offense kept them out.

The State Fair of Louisiana filed a lawsuit in Caddo district court on August 31, 2000 regarding the final two years of the Bombers' three-year contract to play in Hirsch Memorial Coliseum. By all indications from Bombers' ownership, the State Fair of Louisiana doesn't expect the Bombers to be back for their second season.

With the construction of a new arena, CenturyTel Center in Bossier City, LA, and its subsequent lease with the af2 Bossier City Battle Wings, the Bombers left the field for good after that season.

== 2000 IPFL Shreveport-Bossier Bombers schedule ==
2000 IPFL Shreveport-Bossier Bombers secondary logo

Week 1 - bye

Saturday, April 15 - Omaha Beef 39 at Shreveport-Bossier 44

Saturday, April 22 - Louisiana Rangers 42 at Shreveport-Bossier 29

Saturday, April 29 - Shreveport-Bossier 10 at Portland Prowlers 31

Sunday, May 7 - Idaho Stallions 44 at Shreveport-Bossier 38

Saturday, May 13 - Shreveport-Bossier 19 at Louisiana Rangers 39

Sunday, May 21 - Shreveport-Bossier 17 at Mississippi Fire Dogs 57

Friday, May 26 - Shreveport-Bossier 6 at Omaha Beef 28

Saturday, June 3 - Mobile Seagulls 31 at Shreveport-Bossier 34

Saturday, June 10 - Shreveport-Bossier 27 at Mobile Seagulls 15

Week 11 - bye

Saturday, June 24 - Portland Prowlers 28 at Shreveport-Bossier 22

Saturday, July 1 - Shreveport-Bossier 8 at Idaho Stallions 14

Saturday, July 8 - Mobile Seagulls 55 at Shreveport-Bossier 51

Week 15 - bye

Saturday, July 22 - Louisiana Rangers 29 at Shreveport-Bossier 35

Saturday, July 29 - Shreveport-Bossier 34 at Mississippi Fire Dogs 49

Saturday, August 5 - Mississippi Fire Dogs 37 at Shreveport-Bossier 41

Saturday, August 12 - Shreveport-Bossier 35 at Louisiana Rangers 60

saturday, December 3 - Shreveport-bombers 47 at Port City Rams 54
