= John Fourcade =

American gridiron football player and coach (born 1960)

No. 12, 11, 7
- Position: Quarterback

Personal information
- Born: October 11, 1960 (age 66); Gretna, Louisiana, U.S.
- Listed height: 6 ft 1 in (1.85 m)
- Listed weight: 208 lb (94 kg)

Career information
- High school: Marrero (LA) Archbishop Shaw
- College: Ole Miss
- NFL draft: 1982: undrafted

Career history

Playing
- British Columbia Lions (1983); Winnipeg Blue Bombers (1984); Memphis Showboats (1985); New York Giants (1985–1986)*; Denver Dynamite (1987)*; New Orleans Saints (1987–1990); Miami Hooters (1993); Milwaukee Mustangs (1994); Mississippi Fire Dogs (1998–2000); Mobile Seagulls (2001); Louisiana Bayou Beast (2001)
- * Offseason or practice squad member only

Coaching
- Miami Hooters (1995) Head coach; Mississippi Fire Dogs (1998–2000) Head coach; Mobile Seagulls (2001) Head coach; Louisiana Bayou Beast (2001) Head coach; Florida Firecats (2002) Head coach; Columbus Wardogs (2003) Head coach; Florida Firecats (2004) Head coach; Tupelo FireAnts (2005) Head coach; Bossier-Shreveport Battle Wings (2006) Head coach; Fairbanks Grizzlies (2007) Head coach; Acadiana Mudbugs (2008) Head coach; Rio Grande Valley Magic (2009–2012) Head coach; New Mexico Stars (2016) Head coach

Operations
- Mississippi Fire Dogs (1999–2000) General manager; New Mexico Stars (2016) General manager

Awards and highlights
- First-team All-SEC (1980); Second-team All-SEC (1979)

Career NFL statistics
- Passing attempts: 313
- Passing completions: 159
- Completion percentage: 50.8%
- TD–INT: 14–15
- Passing yards: 2,312
- Passer rating: 70.1
- Stats at Pro Football Reference

Career AFL statistics
- Comp. / Att.: 118 / 205
- Passing yards: 1,152
- TD–INT: 12–11
- QB rating: 65.75
- Rushing TD: 4
- Stats at ArenaFan.com

Head coaching record
- Regular season: 1–11 (.083)
- Postseason: 0–0 (–)
- Career: 1–11 (.083)

John Charles Fourcade, Jr. (born October 11, 1960) is an American former professional football player who was a quarterback for the New Orleans Saints of the National Football League (NFL). He played college football for the Ole Miss Rebels. Fourcade was the most valuable player of the 1982 Senior Bowl after passing for 115 yards and running for 33 yards and two touchdowns. He had gained 6,713 yards with Ole Miss from 1978 to 1981, breaking the career record of Archie Manning.

== Professional career ==
Fourcade played as an undrafted free agent in four games as a backup to Joe Paopao for the British Columbia Lions in 1983. As a career journeyman quarterback, he played for the 1984 Winnipeg Blue Bombers (CFL) and the 1985 Memphis Showboats (USFL) before being signed as a free agent by the New York Giants in May 1986. He then played for the 1987 Denver Dynamite in the Arena Football League. In 1987, he led the Saints to a 2–1 replacement game record and made the regular roster. Over his career, Fourcade passed for 2,312 yards in 24 games for the Saints, with a passer rating of 70.1. He was waived by the Saints in July 1991. In 1993, he played for the Miami Hooters of the AFL. From 1998 to 2000, he was the general manager, head coach and played in the National Indoor Football League for the Mississippi Fire Dogs. In 2001, he played for the Mobile Seagulls and the Louisiana Bayou Beast in the National Indoor Football League.

== Coaching career ==
Prior to playing for the Saints in the replacement games, J. Fourcade was the QB coach at John Ehret High School, Marrero La. From 1986 to 1987. At John Ehret, Fourcade coached Kordell "Slash" Stewart. Fourcade played with the 1994 Milwaukee Mustangs (AFL), and Coached the 1995 Miami Hooters (AFL), the 1999–2000 Mississippi Fire Dogs (IPFL), the 2001 Mobile Seagulls/Louisiana Bayou Beast (NIFL), the 2002 Florida Firecats (af2), the 2003–2004 Columbus Wardogs (af2), the 2005 Tupelo FireAnts (UIF) and the 2006 Bossier-Shreveport Battle Wings (af2).

In the 2007 season, Fourcade was the head coach of the IFL's Fairbanks Grizzlies in Fairbanks, Alaska.

In the 2008 season, he led the Acadiana Mudbugs to the SIFL's first playoffs and finished the season 6–6. For the 2010 season, he was fired after the team's opening game loss (they had since been renamed the Lafayette Wildcatters) and replaced by ex-Arena League and Af2 Coach Skip Foster.

On August 20, 2009, it was announced that Fourcade would be the head coach of the Rio Grande Valley Magic SIFL team for its inaugural 2010 season.

John Fourcade has since left the SIFL and first moved on to the new Lone Star Football League, in which he was the head coach of the Rio Grande Valley Magic in the 2011 season.

On December 26, 2015, John Fourcade was announced as head coach of the Louisiana Cottonmouths indoor football team, but the team folded without ever competing before the season began.

In April 2016, Fourcade was named the head coach of the New Mexico Stars, an indoor football team.

== Broadcasting career ==
Fourcade currently serves as an NFL football analyst for WDSU (NBC) New Orleans.

On September 5, 2013, the "John Fourcade Show presented by Ray Brandt" will premiere on WHNO TV (LeSEA Broadcasting) in the New Orleans area. John Fourcade will join with host Mike Detillier to discuss upcoming Saints, NFL, and LSU action. The show will be shot on location at featured Ray Brandt automotive dealerships.

== Personal life ==
Fourcade once dated Marla Maples.

Fourcade is the uncle of former Nicholls quarterback Chase Fourcade.
