= Vaughn Hebron =

American football player and coach (born 1970)

No. 45, 22
- Position: Running back

Personal information
- Born: October 7, 1970 (age 56); Baltimore, Maryland, U.S.
- Listed height: 5 ft 8 in (1.73 m)
- Listed weight: 192 lb (87 kg)

Career information
- High school: Cardinal Gibbons (MD)
- College: Virginia Tech
- NFL draft: 1993: undrafted

Career history

Playing
- Philadelphia Eagles (1993–1995); Denver Broncos (1996–1998)

Coaching
- Trenton Lightning (2001) Head coach

Awards and highlights
- 2× Super Bowl champion (XXXII, XXXIII)

Career NFL statistics
- Rushing yards: 1,137
- Rushing average: 4.2
- Receptions: 41
- Receiving yards: 303
- Return yards: 3,802
- Total touchdowns: 8
- Stats at Pro Football Reference

Vaughn Harlen Hebron (born October 7, 1970) is an American former professional football player who was a running back in the National Football League (NFL) for the Philadelphia Eagles and Denver Broncos. He played college football for the Virginia Tech Hokies.

== Early life ==
Hebron attended and played high school football at the Cardinal Gibbons School. He also participated in track and field. Hebron graduated high school in 1989. Hebron played college football at Virginia Tech.

== Professional career ==
Hebron signed as a free-agent with the Philadelphia Eagles where he played running back. After two seasons with the Eagles, he signed with the Denver Broncos, where he was a member of two Super Bowl winning teams (Super Bowl XXXII and Super Bowl XXXIII). Hebron holds multiple Broncos franchise records for kickoff returns, including the highest amount of career kickoff returns (134) and highest amount of career kickoff return yards (3,324).

== Coaching career ==
Hebron was named the head coach of the Trenton Lightning of the Indoor Professional Football League in 2001.

== After football ==
Hebron is currently CEO and President of VMS Movement Specialists, a fitness center and personal training studio located in Newtown, Pennsylvania. He was an analyst for Eagles Post Game Live on Comcast SportsNet Philadelphia, which airs after every Philadelphia Eagles game. He starred alongside host Michael Barkann, Pennsylvania Governor Ed Rendell, and Ray Didinger. Hebron was replaced by retired Eagles offensive tackle Tra Thomas for the 2011–2012 NFL season.

He was interviewed for an episode of NFL's Greatest Games which aired on ESPN2.
