= Rapides Parish Coliseum =

Arena in Louisiana, United States

Laborde Earles Coliseum
- Rapides Coliseum, The Coliseum
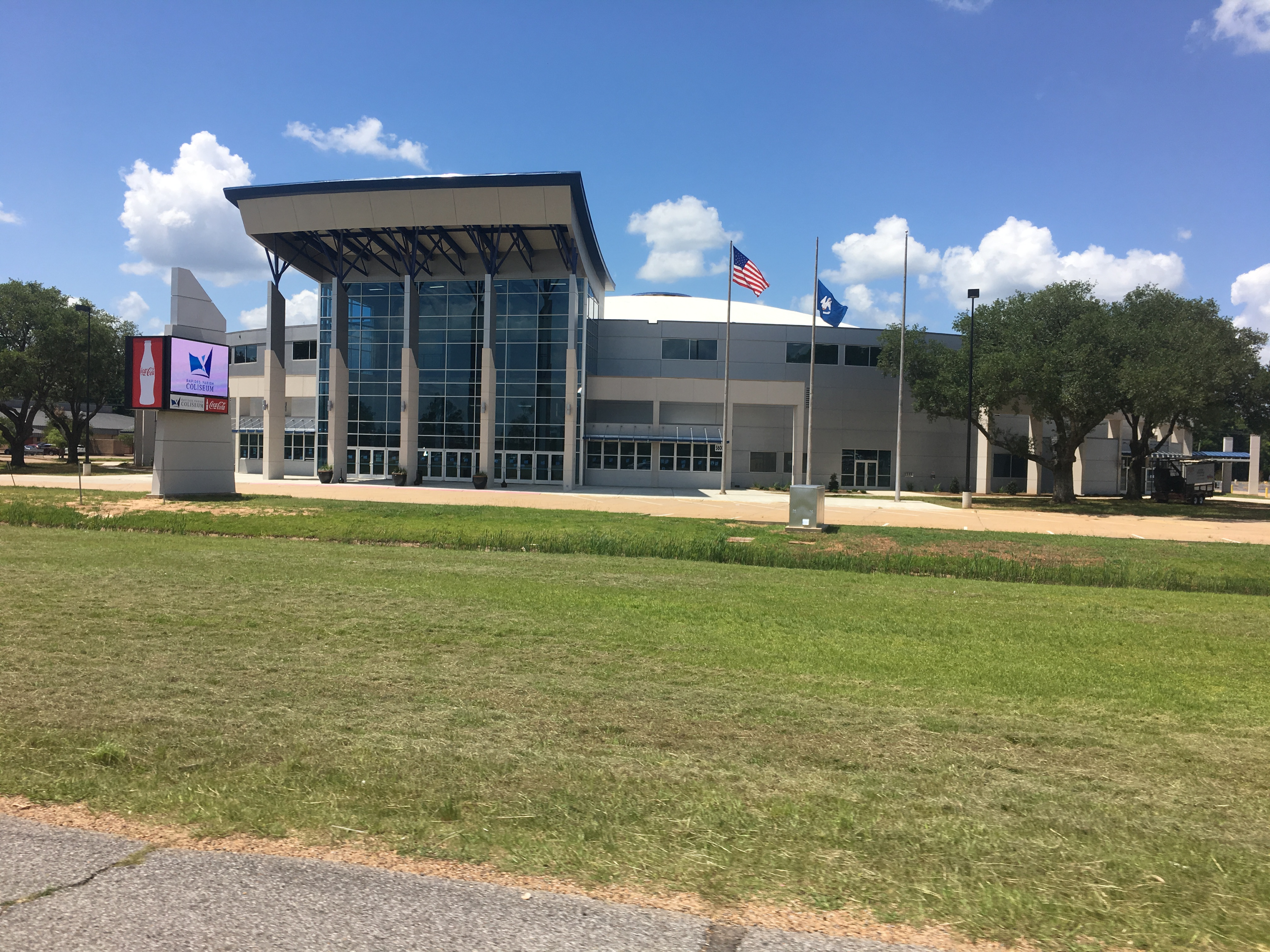
- Front Entrance of Rapides Coliseum
- Interactive map of Laborde Earles Coliseum
- Former names: Rapides Parish Coliseum (1965–2025)
- Location: 5600 Coliseum Boulevard; Alexandria, Louisiana 71303
- Coordinates: 31°17′48″N 92°30′13″W
- Owner: Rapides Parish
- Operator: ASM Global
- Capacity: Center-Stage: 10,000; Basketball: 8,900; Concert End-Stage: 8,000; Open Floor: 7,000
- Surface: Multi-surface

Construction
- Opened: 1965 (61 years ago)
- Renovated: 2015–2017
- Reopened: February 10, 2017 (9 years ago)
- Cost: $22.9 million (2017 renovation)
- Architects: Buddy Tudor, Tudor Construction Company Bill Tudor, Alliance Design Group (2017 Renovation)

Tenants
- Alexandria Warthogs (WPHL) (1998–2000); Louisiana Rangers (IPFL/NIFL) (2000–2002)

The Laborde Earles Coliseum, formerly known as the Rapides Parish Coliseum, is a multi-purpose arena located on Louisiana Highway 28 West in Alexandria, Louisiana. The coliseum can seat up to 10,000 "Louisiana Sports Venues". 2017. people in the 65,000-square-foot (6,000 m^{2}) building. The venue was renamed in 2025 following a naming rights agreement with Laborde Earles Injury Lawyers, becoming the first corporate naming rights partner in the facility's history.

Built in 1965 by Buddy Tudor's family-owned construction company in Pineville, with foreman Pete Honeycutt, along with the senior Tudor directing the construction. The dome-topped coliseum has hosted thousands of events, including music concerts, "monster" truck shows, professional wrestling, trade shows and sporting events.

Additional facilities on the grounds include a 23,000-square-foot (2,100 m^{2}) Exhibition Hall, often used for trade shows. The Exhibition Hall has been rebranded as of 2025 as the Entertainment Center at the Rapides Parish Coliseum.

== Naming Rights ==
In 2025, the Rapides Parish Coliseum was officially renamed the Laborde Earles Coliseum as part of a naming rights agreement with Laborde Earles Injury Lawyers, a Louisiana-based personal injury law firm. The partnership marked the first naming rights agreement in the venue's history and was established to support continued investment, operations, and event development at the facility.

While the venue now operates under the Laborde Earles Coliseum name, it continues to be commonly referred to by residents as the Rapides Parish Coliseum or simply "The Coliseum" due to its longstanding role as a landmark and entertainment venue in Central Louisiana.

== Arena information ==
The arena was first constructed in 1964 and completed in 1965. The venue features 4 meeting rooms with over 700 square feet (100 m^{2}) of space, 2 multi-purpose rooms with over 2,100 square feet (200 m^{2}) of space, a catering kitchen, 4 locker rooms, 10 luxury suites, office space and ticket booths. The coliseum property contains a 2,500 parking lot space.

Anthony S. "Tony" D'Angelo (1917–2012), an Alexandria native, was named in the spring of 1969 as the manager of the Coliseum. After thirty years as an officer in the United States Navy, in which he reached the rank of lieutenant commander, D'Angelo returned home to take over management of the facility and served in that capacity through most of the 1970s. He was then named the Alexandria municipal public works director under then Mayor Carroll E. Lanier, upon the retirement for health reasons of the previous director, Malcolm Hebert.

Beginning September 1, 2017, a private firm called SMG will assume management of the Coliseum; the company was actually in place a month earlier in preparation for the transition. SMG has a five-year contract to run the facility. With the Rapides Parish Jury's decision to allow SMG to take over operations for the Coliseum, the officials held a special meeting on August 11, 2017, and voted to dissolve the Coliseum Authority. Rapides Parish officials contend that SMG can offer better incentives to promoters so that a smaller market like Alexandria can land quality entertainment. The company manages eleven facilities in Louisiana, including the Mercedes-Benz Superdome in New Orleans and the CenturyLink Center in Bossier City.

=== 2017 Renovations ===
In October 2008, a report was produced for the Rapides Parish Police Jury that estimated the total cost of repairs and needed updates to be $10 million. On November 6, 2012, Rapides Parish voters approved a $23 million bond issue backed by a $2.5 million property tax for the coliseum. Also approved was a $1 million tax to pay for the coliseum maintenance and operations for 20 years. The $23 million taxes would pay for renovation projects that included an expanded seating capacity, a new 3-story lobby, sky boxes and exhibition hall, improved electrical systems and roofing, new rest rooms, stages, dressing rooms, and a basketball floor, and a rebuilt parking space. The coliseum also features a new center-hung video display. The renovation was designed to give the coliseum a modern appeal and attract larger events for the Rapides Parish area.

Start of construction for the project was delayed due to the Rapides Parish Police Jury's difficulty in obtaining a permit to begin the renovations because of a dispute between them and the city of Alexandria over the Rapides Parish Coliseum parking lot issue, which was eventually settled. The project officially began in April 2015. Renovation was completed, and the coliseum held its grand opening on February 10, 2017.

=== Seating capacity ===
The arena as a concert venue can seat 8,000 for end-stage shows and 10,000 for center-stage shows. For open floor shows, the arena can seat 7,000. For basketball games, the venue can seat 8,900.

The maximum seating capacity history for the venue has gone as follows:

- 6,512 (1965–2017)
- 10,000 (2017–present)

== Events ==
=== Sports ===
The LSUA Generals Men's and Women's basketball teams played their first ever home game in the coliseum on February 16, 2017, against the St. Thomas Celts. Peak attendance was reached in the Men's game with 2,722 fans. This was the coliseum's first event held there since its closure for renovations. The Men's team defeated St. Thomas 80–75, and the Women's team won 80–50.

The coliseum hosted the men's and women's Red River Athletic Conference basketball tournament on March 2–4, 2017. This was the first time the RRAC's tournament, since going to a single site format in 2001, is played outside the state of Texas. The Coliseum annually hosts the Red River Athletic Conference basketball tournament, dating back to 2017 and has in previous years hosted the first two rounds of the NAIA Basketball Tournament as well.

==== Former sports ====
Past sports teams based at the Rapides Coliseum include the Louisiana Rangers, a member of the IPFL, and the Alexandria Warthogs, a member of the WPHL. The Coliseum has also hosted the Louisiana High School Athletic Association basketball state championships in the past.

=== Other events ===
The coliseum was home to the annual Rapides Parish Fair every October from 1960 to 2013. In 2014, the fair moved to the LSUA Ag center on U.S. Route 71 just south of Alexandria.

Some of the site's more famous visitors include Lipizzan stallions (1973), Elvis Presley (1977), Holiday on Ice, the Rev. Martin Luther King Jr. (1966), Ronald Reagan (1975), George Wallace Jr. (1976), ZZ Top (2021) and Zach Bryan (2022)

In 2005, the facility was used as a shelter by the American Red Cross after Hurricane Katrina and during Hurricane Rita. It was during Rita that it lost power and water for a short period.

Recent events staged at the site include the Barnum and Bailey Circus on Dec. 2, 2008, World Wrestling Entertainment multiple times, and the Gaither Homecoming Tour on March 7, 2009.

== Gallery ==
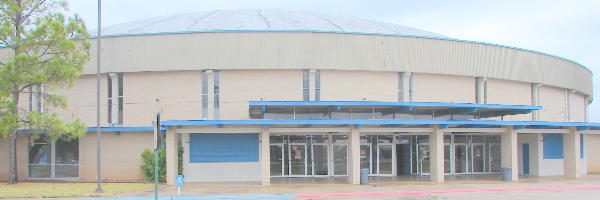
Rapides Coliseum - Nov 2008

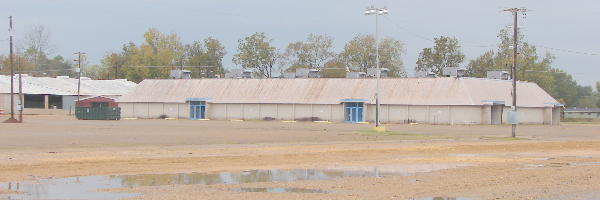
Rapides Coliseum Exhibition Hall - Nov 2008

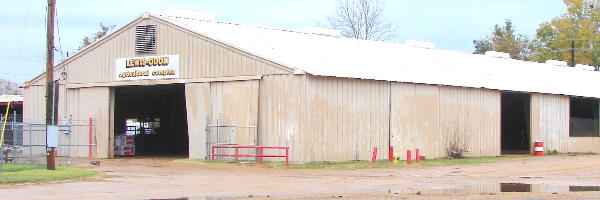
Lewis-Odom Agricultural Complex - Nov 2008

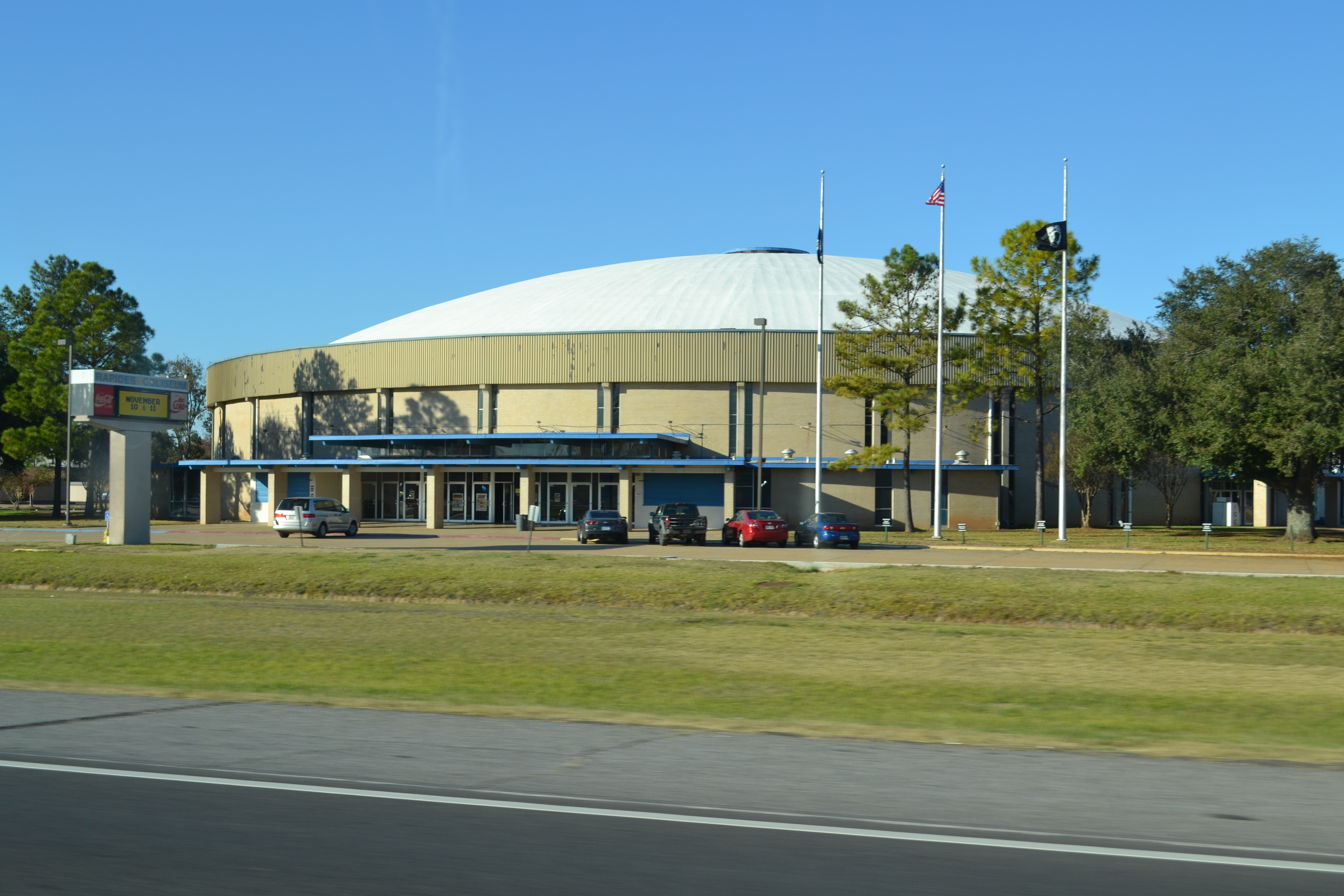
Rapides Parish Coliseum before renovations - Nov 2012.

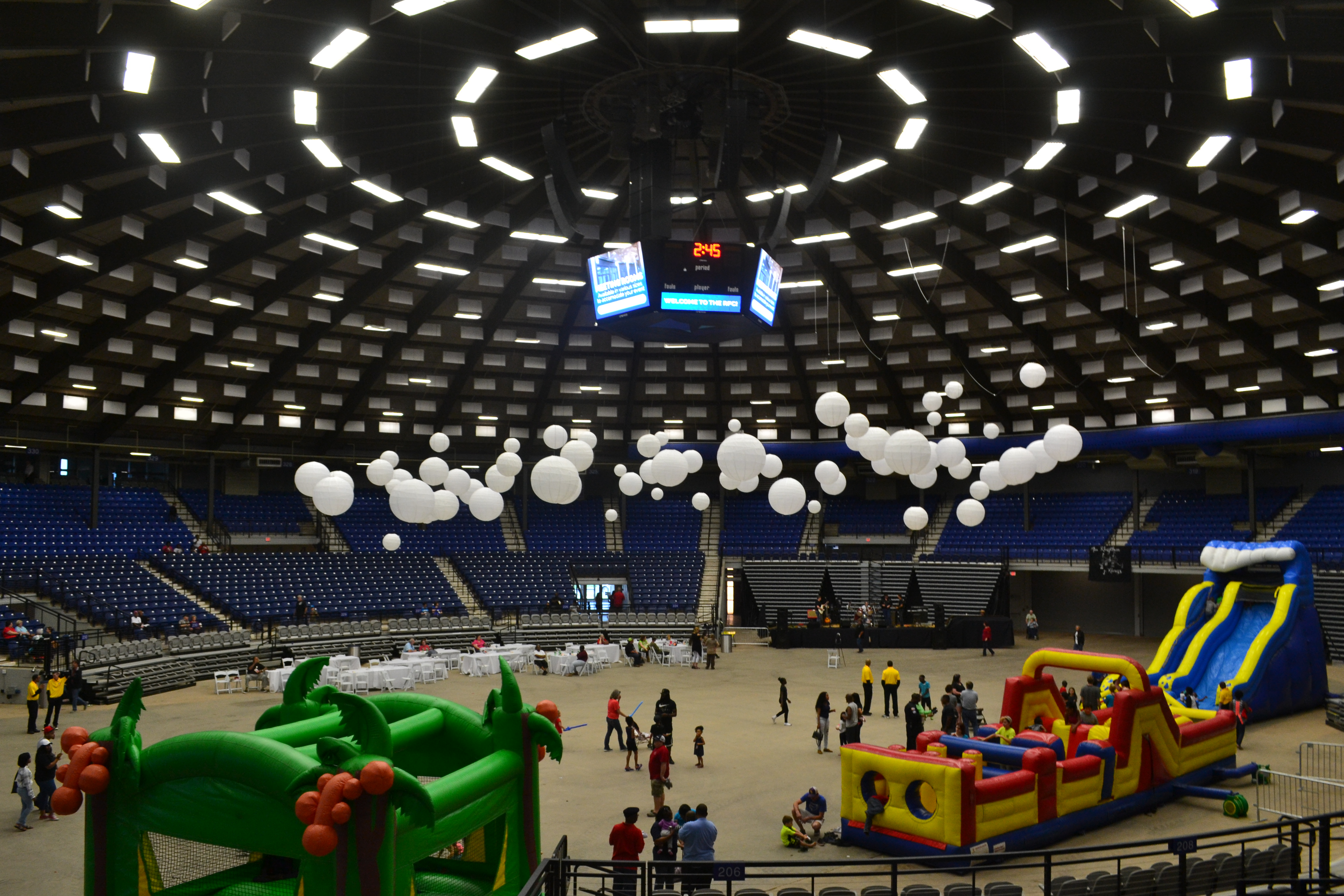
Open house inside the newly renovated Rapides Parish Coliseum - Feb 2017.

== See also ==
- List of convention centers in the United States
- List of music venues
