= Portland Prowlers =

American indoor football team

Logo

General information
- Founded: 2000
- Folded: 2000
- Headquartered: Portland, Oregon at the Memorial Coliseum
- Colors: Black, Cardinal, Gold, White

Personnel
- Head coach: Richard Harris

Team history
- Portland Prowlers (2000)

Home fields
- Memorial Coliseum (2000)

League / conference affiliations
- Indoor Professional Football League (2000)

The Portland Prowlers were a professional indoor football team based in Portland, Oregon. Playing as a member of the Indoor Professional Football League (IPFL) for the 2000 season, they played their home games at the Memorial Coliseum. This was the second indoor football team based in Portland following the Portland Forest Dragons. The team name was decided in a 'Name the team' contest. The winning name was submitted by several entrants, including Danny Bradach of Portland, Oregon and David Harwood of Concord, California. Contest winners were awarded season tickets for the lifetime of the team.

The Prowlers were announced as an expansion franchise as part of the IPFL in January, 2000. The team did see success on the field in finishing as regular season champions and narrowly losing to the Mississippi Fire Dogs 53-48 for the 2000 championship. However, the success on the field never translated into success in the stands, and the team announced they would not return for the 2001 season on March 23, 2001. Although, the team intended to begin play in the 2002 season in Vancouver, Washington, plans never materialized.

== 2000 Portland Prowlers IPFL Schedule ==
Week 1 – Portland Prowlers 52, Louisiana Rangers 36

Week 2 – Portland Prowlers 42, Mississippi Fire Dogs 41

Week 3 – Portland Prowlers 43, Omaha Beef 23

Week 4 – Portland Prowlers 31, Shreveport-Bossier Bombers 10

Week 5 – Mobile Seagulls 19, Portland Prowlers 12

Week 6 – Idaho Stallions 41, Portland Prowlers 30

Week 7 – Portland Prowlers 46, Idaho Stallions 35

Week 8 - bye

Week 9 – Portland Prowlers 61, Louisiana Rangers 55

Week 10 – Portland Prowlers 34, Omaha Beef 30

Week 11 – Portland Prowlers 67, Omaha Beef 54

Week 12 – Portland Prowlers 28, Shreveport-Bossier Bombers 22

Week 13 – Mobile Seagulls 57, Portland Prowlers 41

Week 14 - bye

Week 15 – Mississippi Fire Dogs 39, Portland Prowlers 36

Week 16 – Portland Prowlers 61, Idaho Stallions 14

Week 17 - bye

Week 18 – Portland Prowlers 40, Omaha Beef 26

Week 19 – Portland Prowlers 35, Idaho Stallions 22

IPFL Championship – Mississippi Fire Dogs 53, Portland Prowlers 48

== Season-By-Season ==
Season records
Season	W	L	T	Finish	Playoff results
Portland Prowlers
2000	11	5	0	1st League	Lost to Mississippi in championship
