= Mobile Seagulls =

American indoor football team, 2000–2001

Logo

General information
- Founded: 2000
- Folded: 2001
- Headquartered: Mobile, Alabama at the Mitchell Center
- Colors: Dark Green, Silver, White

Personnel
- Head coach: John Fourcade & Kenny Burrough

Team history
- Mobile Seagulls (2000-2001)

Home fields
- Mobile Civic Center Arena (2000); Mitchell Center (2001)

League / conference affiliations
- Indoor Professional Football League (2000); National Indoor Football League (2001)

The Mobile Seagulls were a professional indoor football team. They were initially a member of the Indoor Professional Football League for the 2000 season before joining the National Indoor Football League for the 2001 season, their final. They played their home games at Mobile Civic Center Arena for the 2000 season and at the Mitchell Center for the 2001 season. The owners of the team was Mobile businessman, Norris Armstrong, James Childers, John Kirby, Steve Clements, and James Gordon; manager Neal Delacano.

The Seagulls were announced as an expansion franchise as part of the IPFL on February 10, 2000. It was during this press conference that former Houston Oilers receiver Kenny Burrough was announced as the team's general manager and head coach. The 2001 season saw former New Orleans Saints QB, John Fourcade take over as head coach and quarterback.

== 2000 Mobile Seagulls IPFL Schedule ==
Week 1 – Mobile Seagulls 33, at Mississippi Fire Dogs 57

Week 2 – Mobile Seagulls 29, at Louisiana Rangers 43

Week 3 – bye

Week 4 – Mississippi Fire Dogs 23, at Mobile Seagulls 30

Week 5 – Portland Prowlers 12, at Mobile Seagulls 19

Week 6 – Omaha Beef 39, at Mobile Seagulls 36

Week 7 – bye

Week 8 – Louisiana Rangers 32, at Mobile Seagulls 3

Week 9 – Mobile Seagulls 31, at Shreveport-Bossier Bombers 34

Week 10 – Shreveport-Bossier Bombers 27, at Mobile Seagulls 15

Week 11 – Mobile Seagulls 40, at Mississippi Fire Dogs 30

Week 12 – Mississippi Fire Dogs 30, at Mobile Seagulls 16

Week 13 – Mobile Seagulls 57, at Portland Prowlers 41

Week 14 – Mobile Seagulls 55, at Shreveport-Bossier Bombers 51

Week 15 – Louisiana Rangers 13, at Mobile Seagulls 21

Week 16 – Mobile Seagulls 44, at Omaha Beef 57

Week 17 – Idaho Stallions 7, at Mobile Seagulls 63

Week 18 – Mobile Seagulls 51, at Idaho Stallions 34

Week 19 – bye

== Season-By-Season ==
Season records
Season	W	L	T	Finish	Playoff results
Mobile Seagulls (IPFL)
2000	8	8	0	4th League	--
Mobile Seagulls (NIFL)
2001	5	7	0	4th Southern	--
Totals	13	15	0	(including playoffs)	
