= Hirsch Memorial Coliseum =

Arena in Louisiana, United States

Coordinates: 32.476652°N 93.789477°W

- Interactive map of Hirsch Memorial Coliseum
- Location: Shreveport, Louisiana
- Owner: The State Fair of Louisiana
- Operator: Encompass Sports
- Capacity: 10,300
- Field size: 28,800 sq. ft. exhibit space

Construction
- Opened: 1954
- Renovated: 2016
- Architect: Edward F. Neild Jr.

Tenants
- Shreveport Crawdads/Storm (CBA) (1994–1996); Shreveport Mudbugs (WPHL) (1997–2000); Shreveport-Bossier Bombers (IPFL) (2000); Shreveport-Bossier Mavericks (ABA) (2013–2015); Shreveport Mudbugs (NAHL) (2016–present); Shreveport Rouxgaroux (NAL) (2025)

Hirsch Memorial Coliseum is a 10,000-seat multi-purpose arena in Shreveport, Louisiana, designed by the late local architect Edward F. Neild Jr. (1908–1958) who, with his father in 1937, had designed the Louisiana State Exhibit Museum in Shreveport. The coliseum is named after William Rex Hirsch, a former fair president, manager and treasurer. The building completed construction in 1954, the year of Hirsch's death, and initially was planned to have the name The Youth Building. The coliseum has been used for a variety of events through the years, with dirt being brought in and placed on the floor for rodeos and tractor pulls. It is located adjacent to the Independence Stadium and across from Fair Park High School in Shreveport. Hirsch coliseum is very similar in design, though smaller in size to the John M. Parker Agricultural Coliseum (completed in 1937 and designed by Neild, Sr), owned and operated by the Louisiana State University Campus in Baton Rouge. However, the Parker coliseum has a dirt floor arena and is mainly used for livestock-type events, with portable hard floors laid on top of the dirt for other types of events such as basketball games or concerts.

== Sports tenants ==
The Hirsch was home to the professional Shreveport Mudbugs minor league ice hockey team, from 1997, until they moved to the CenturyTel Center, in Bossier City in 2000. It hosted the 1981 Atlantic Sun Conference men's basketball tournament and has hosted the Southland Conference men's basketball tournament six times. It was also home to the Shreveport-Bossier Bombers indoor football team.

The Coliseum has hosted many professional wrestling events over the years including NWA, WCW and WWE events.

From 2013 to 2015, the Hirsch was home to a professional basketball franchise through the American Basketball Association called the Shreveport-Bossier Mavericks.

In 2016, a new junior hockey team returned as the Shreveport Mudbugs in the North American Hockey League and play at George's Pond at Hirsch Memorial Coliseum.

In 2025, indoor football will return to the Coliseum when the Shreveport Rouxgaroux begin play in the National Arena League.

== Music events ==
It also has a long history as a concert venue. Most notably, Hirsch Memorial Coliseum is where the words "Elvis has left the building!" were first uttered in 1957. Not only that, but on June 7, 1975 Elvis Presley himself performed an afternoon and evening show at the coliseum. His next and final appearance at the coliseum would be on July 1, 1976, 13 months before his death on August 16 of the following year. This is also the venue in which Eddie Van Halen of Van Halen first met his future wife Valerie Bertinelli after a show in August 1980. Van Halen played the first show of the 5150 tour (and first show with new lead singer Sammy Hagar) at this venue on March 27, 1986. Rush was scheduled to perform during their Roll the Bones Tour on February 22, 1992, with Primus as their opening act, but the show was cancelled due to Geddy Lee contracting laryngitis. In January 1995, it was the scene of a small scale riot, when a Pantera concert was cancelled at the last minute, because of a city ordinance that had just gone into effect, requiring seating on the floor, which the band felt created an unsafe situation for the fans and themselves.

Notable other events from Hirsch Memorial Coliseum includes Miss USA and Miss Teen USA with the latter pageant held for four occasions.

== See also ==
- List of music venues
