= Trenton Lightning =

The Trenton Lightning were an indoor professional football team founded in 2000 by owner/general manager, Phillip J. Subhan and local businessman, Kenneth Samu. The team started the 2001 season in the Indoor Professional Football League (IPFL) and were led by head coach (ex-NFL RB) Vaughn Hebron (played for the Philadelphia Eagles, Denver Broncos and Indianapolis Colts) and the team played its home games at the Sovereign Bank Arena, capacity 7,605 in Trenton, New Jersey. The team was originally scheduled for a 16-game season (eight home and eight away games), But, the team was to fold after only 6 games. The team's Director of Football operations was Marty Yukichak and the team had a front office staff of seven others in addition to a coaching staff of eight, including Hebron. The team's defensive coordinator was Chuck Murphy and offensive coordinator was Tom Cocuzza.

The 21 member active roster was made up mostly of local college football players stemming from Rutgers University, West Virginia, Penn State, as well as a number of players from the local (Division III) New Jersey Athletic Conference. The players were paid $200 per game, plus stipend for away games. The Trenton area has traditionally supported a number of successful minor league sports franchises including the Trenton Thunder (Boston Red Sox and New York Yankees Minor League Baseball affiliate) and Trenton Titans (East Coast Hockey League) and the Lightning's attendance was strong (with average attendance of nearly 4,000 in their 6,500 capacity arena). Despite local talent and strong support, the team finished their inaugural (and last/shortened) season 0-6.

== 2001 IPFL Trenton Lightning schedule ==

Friday, April 13 Trenton Lightning at Tennessee ThunderCats 25-52

Saturday, April 21 Trenton Lightning at Boise Stallions 12-29

Saturday, April 28 Omaha Beef at Trenton Lightning 51-41

Saturday, May 5 St. Louis Renegades at Trenton Lightning 14-13

Saturday, May 12 Trenton Lightning at Tennessee ThunderCats 26-39

Saturday, May 19 Tennessee ThunderCats at Trenton Lightning 41-24

Saturday, June 2 Boise Stallions at Trenton Lightning CANCELLED

Saturday, June 9 Trenton Lightning at Boise Stallions CANCELLED

Saturday, June 16 Trenton Lightning at Omaha Beef CANCELLED

Saturday, June 22 St. Louis Renegades at Trenton Lightning CANCELLED

Saturday, July 7 Boise Stallions at Trenton Lightning CANCELLED

Saturday, July 14 Trenton Lightning at St. Louis Renegades CANCELLED

Saturday, July 21 Tennessee ThunderCats at Trenton Lightning CANCELLED

Saturday, August 4 Omaha Beef at Trenton Lightning CANCELLED

Saturday, August 11 Trenton Lightning at St. Louis Renegades CANCELLED

Saturday, August 18 Trenton Lightning at Omaha Beef CANCELLED
