= Idaho Central Arena =

Multi-purpose arena in Boise, Idaho, U.S.

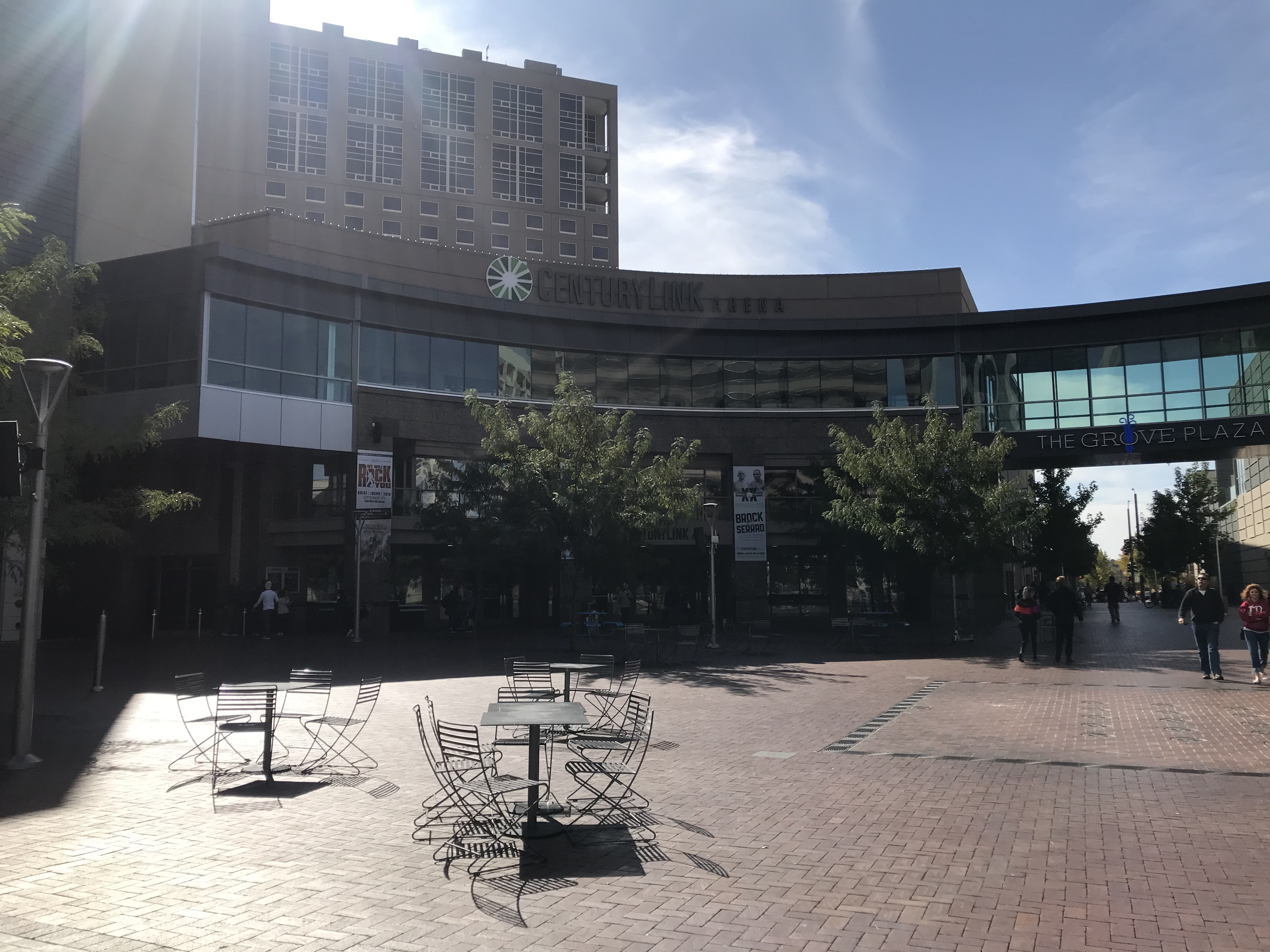
- The Grove Plaza at north entrance, October 2019

- Location in the United States Location in Idaho
- Full name: Idaho Central Arena
- Former names: Bank of America Centre (1997–2005); Qwest Arena (2005–2011); CenturyLink Arena (2011–2020)
- Address: 233 S. Capitol Boulevard
- Location: Boise, Idaho, U.S.
- Coordinates: 43.614°N 116.204°W
- Elevation: 2,700 feet (825 m) AMSL
- Owner: Block 22 LLC
- Operator: Block 22 LLC
- Capacity: Ice hockey: 5,002; Basketball: 5,732; Concerts: 6,800; Boxing: 6,400
- Surface: Multi-surface

Construction
- Groundbreaking: January 21, 1996
- Opened: September 24, 1997; 29 years ago
- Cost: $50 million ($100 million in 2025)
- Architect: HNTB
- Structural engineers: Cary Kopczynski & Company
- Services engineer: Engineering Incorporated
- General contractor: PCL/McAlvain

Tenants
- Idaho Steelheads (ECHL) (1997–present); Idaho/Boise Stallions (IPFL) (1999–2001); Boise Burn (AF2) (2007–2009); Treasure Valley Rollergirls (WFTDA) (2008–present)

Website
- idahocentralarena.com

Idaho Central Arena (originally Bank of America Centre, formerly Qwest Arena and CenturyLink Arena) is a multi-purpose arena in the western United States, located in Boise, Idaho. Its seating capacity is 5,002 for ice hockey, 5,300 for basketball, 5,732 for end-stage concerts, 6,400 for boxing, and up to 6,800 for center-stage concerts. With 4,508 permanent seats, it was built for $50 million. In downtown Boise, its street level elevation is approximately 2,700 feet (825 m) above sea level.

Opened 29 years ago in September 1997, it has been the home arena of the Idaho Steelheads of the ECHL since then. Past tenants include the Boise Stallions (1999–2001) of the Indoor Professional Football League and the Boise Burn (2007–2009) of the af2.

Originally named the Bank of America Centre, it became Qwest Arena in 2005. With CenturyLink's (Note: CenturyLink adopted the new name of Lumen Technologies in September 2020. The company still uses CenturyLink as the brand name for its copper-based telecom services.) takeover of Qwest Communications in 2011, the venue was renamed on August 18 that same year. On September 16, 2020, Idaho Central Credit Union purchased the naming rights, giving the building its current title.

== Features ==
The arena features 39 corporate suites, 1,100 Club Premiere seats, standing room space for 200, The Zone restaurant (overlooking the arena), as well as a Blimpie franchise among the nine concession stands. The arena is physically connected to the Grove Hotel at the corner of Front Street and Capitol Boulevard; the main entrance is from the Grove Plaza. There are two scoreboards and a Daktronics ProStar videoboard.

The Grove Hotel has 36,000 square feet (3,340 m^{2}) of meeting and convention space in addition to the 22,247 square feet (2,067 m^{2}) of arena floor space.

== Events ==
Idaho Central Arena hosted the 2007 ECHL All-Star Game.

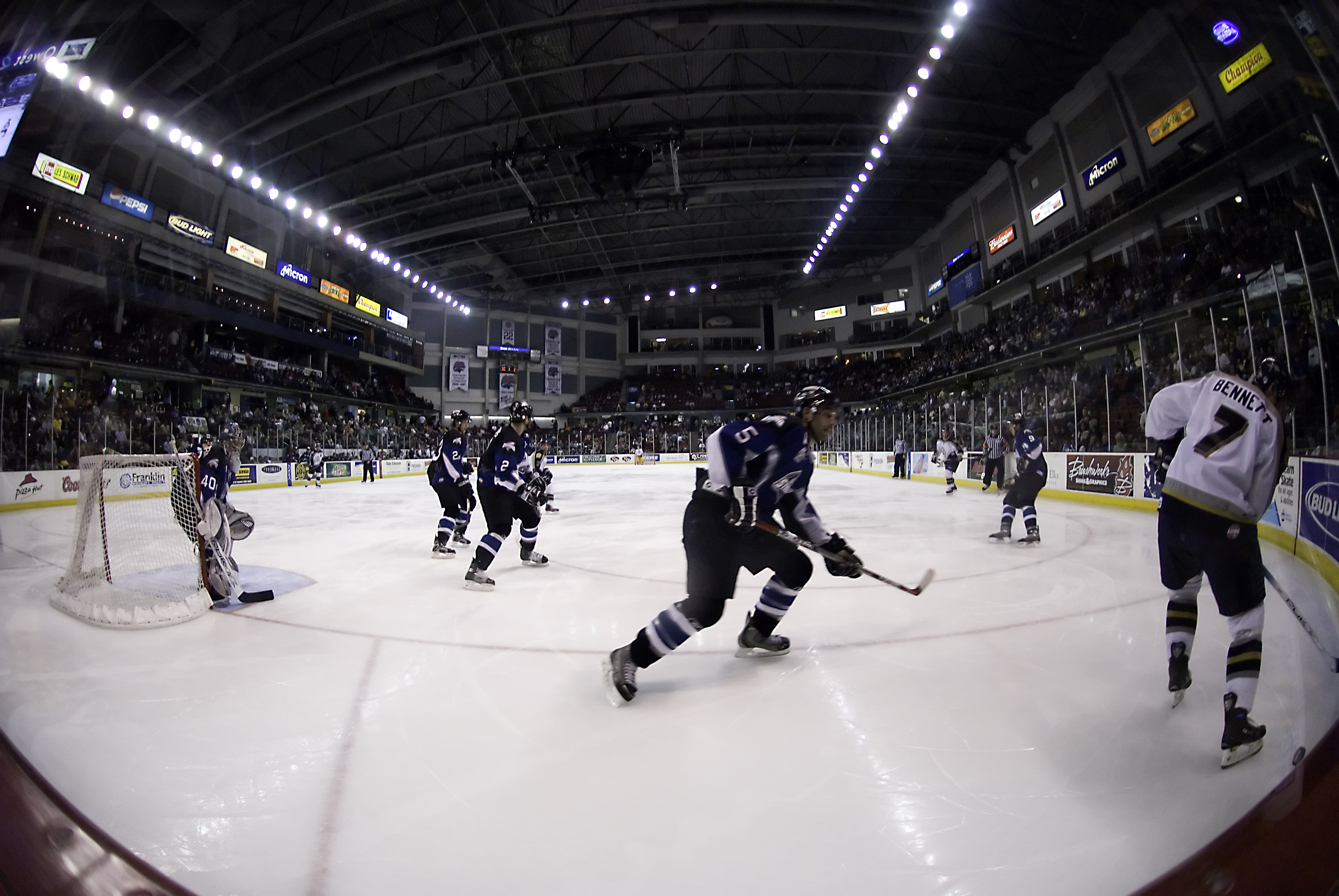
A 2007 Idaho Steelheads game at Idaho Central Arena

Other events hosted in the facility include concerts, trade shows, conventions, ice shows and various other sporting events, including professional wrestling, MMA, and the Treasure Valley Rollergirls roller derby squad.

On July 14, 2018, the arena was host to UFC Fight Night 133, the MMA promotion's first event held in Idaho.

Idaho Central Arena has hosted two NBA D-League Showcases in 2008 and 2010. Each Showcase had all NBA D-League teams play for 4 days, and showed their talent in front of National TV (NBA TV) and had scouts all around the country.

On September 18, 2017, the Big Sky Conference announced that its men's and women's basketball tournaments would move to Idaho Central Arena for three years, starting in 2019. The previous three years (2016–18) were held in Reno, Nevada. The hosting contract has since been extended twice, with the most recent extension running through 2031.

=== Concerts ===
Many artists and bands have performed at the venue, including Judas Priest, Alice in Chains, Godsmack, Five Finger Death Punch, Shinedown, Skillet, Luke Bryan, Yes, Ringo Starr and his All Starr Band, and Rise Against.
