= Boise Stallions =

Indoor professional football team

General information
- Founded: 1999
- Folded: 2001
- Headquartered: Boise, Idaho
- Colors: Navy Blue, Fiery Orange, White
- Mascot: Ace

Team history
- Idaho Stallions (1999-2000); Boise Stallions (2001)

League / conference affiliations
- Indoor Professional Football League (1999–2001)

The Boise Stallions are a defunct indoor football team from Boise, Idaho. They were a charter member of the Indoor Professional Football League. They originally began as the Idaho Stallions. Throughout their three seasons, Larry Stovall-Moody was a kicker and emergency quarterback. At 20 years old, he was the youngest player on the team that signed. During the 2001 season, the Boise Stallions became the only team in the history of professional football to play their home games indoors on grass. Ed Raiford, a former Boise State star, scored the first three touchdowns in Stallion history. When the league folded, the franchise went with it. They were followed six years later by the Boise Burn of af2.

== 1999 Idaho Stallions IPFL Schedule ==
Week 1 - Rocky Mountain Thunder 38, at Idaho Stallions 37

Week 2 - Rocky Mountain Thunder 44, at Idaho Stallions 37

Week 3 - Mississippi Fire Dogs 30, at Idaho Stallions 8

Week 4 - Idaho Stallions 44, at Louisiana Bayou Beast 36

Week 5 - Hawaii Hammerheads 53, at Idaho Stallions 37

Week 6 - Idaho Stallions 27, at Hawaii Hammerheads 26 (OT)

Week 7 - Idaho Stallions 63, at Mississippi Fire Dogs 43

Week 8 - bye

Week 9 - Hawaii Hammerheads 38, at Idaho Stallions 34

Week 10 - Idaho Stallions 63, at Hawaii Hammerheads 51

Week 11 - Texas Terminators 42, at Idaho Stallions 19

Week 12 - bye

Week 13 - Mississippi Fire Dogs 42, at Idaho Stallions 36

Week 14 - Rocky Mountain Thunder 56, at Idaho Stallions 54

Week 15 - Idaho Stallions 43, at Rocky Mountain Thunder 40 (OT)

Week 16 - Louisiana Bayou Beast 51, at Idaho Stallions 34

Week 17 - Idaho Stallions 35, at Texas Terminators 34

Week 18 - Texas Terminators 55, at Idaho Stallions 37

== 2000 Idaho Stallions IPFL Schedule ==
Week 1 - Idaho Stallions 12, at Omaha Beef 26

Week 2 - bye

Week 3 - Idaho Stallions 35, at Mississippi Fire Dogs 22

Week 4 - Omaha Beef 38, at Idaho Stallions 33

Week 5 - Idaho Stallions 44, at Shreveport-Bossier Bombers 38

Week 6 - Portland Prowlers 30, at Idaho Stallions 41

Week 7 - Idaho Stallions 35, at Portland Prowlers 46

Week 8 - bye

Week 9 - Mississippi Fire Dogs 51, at Idaho Stallions 28

Week 10 - bye

Week 11 - Louisiana Rangers 48, at Idaho Stallions 52

Week 12 - Idaho Stallions 17, at Louisiana Rangers 54

Week 13 - Shreveport-Bossier Bombers 8, at Idaho Stallions 14

Week 14 - Omaha Beef 54, at Idaho Stallions 47

Week 15 - Idaho Stallions 39, at Omaha Beef 59

Week 16 - Idaho Stallions 14, at Portland Prowlers 61

Week 17 - Idaho Stallions 7, at Mobile Seagulls 63

Week 18 - Mobile Seagulls 51, at Idaho Stallions 34

Week 19 - Portland Prowlers 35, at Idaho Stallions 22

== 2001 Boise Stallions IPFL Schedule ==
Week 1 - bye

Week 2 - Trenton Lightning 12, at Boise Stallions 29

Week 3 - Boise Stallions 29, at Tennessee ThunderCats 42

Week 4 - Boise Stallions 27, at Omaha Beef 56

Week 5 - bye

Week 6 - St. Louis Renegades 13, at Boise Stallions 15

Week 7 - Omaha Beef 57, at Boise Stallions 34

Week 8 - bye

Week 9 - Omaha Beef 49, at Boise Stallions 45

Week 10 - Boise Stallions 20, at St. Louis Renegades 31

Week 11 - bye

Week 12 - Tennessee ThunderCats 38, at Boise Stallions 40

Week 13 - bye

Week 14 - Omaha Beef 35, at Boise Stallions 9

Week 15 - Boise Stallions 19, at Omaha Beef 58

Week 16 - Boise Stallions 9, at Tennessee ThunderCats 53

Week 17 - St. Louis Renegades at Boise Stallions – cancelled

Week 18 - Tennessee ThunderCats at Boise Stallions – cancelled

Week 19 - Boise Stallions 18, at Omaha Beef 79

== Season-by-season ==
Season records
Season	W	L	T	Finish	Playoff results
Idaho Stallions (IPFL)
1999	6	10	0	4th League	--
2000	5	11	0	6th League	--
Boise Stallions (IPFL)
2001	3	9	0	3rd League	--
Totals	14	30	0		
