= Beaumont Drillers =

Logo

General information
- Founded: 2000
- Folded: 2008
- Headquartered: Beaumont, Texas at the Ford Arena
- Colors: Battle Black, Southern Gold, Hard Hat Silver

Personnel
- Head coach: Bryan Blake

Team history
- Louisiana Rangers (2000–2002); Beaumont Drillers (2003–2008)

Home fields
- Rapides Parish Coliseum (2000–2002); Ford Arena (2003–2008)

League / conference affiliations
- Indoor Professional Football League (2000) National Indoor Football League (2001–2007) American Professional Football League (2008)

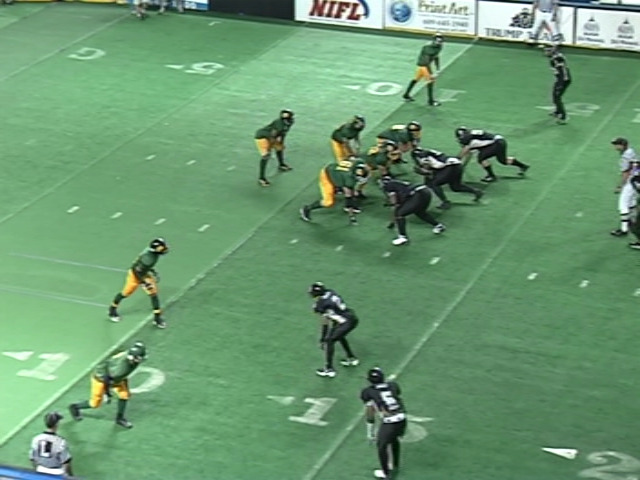
2007 Beaumont Drillers vs San Antonio Steers

The Beaumont Drillers were a professional indoor football team. They played their home games at Ford Arena in Beaumont, Texas. They originally began playing as the Louisiana Rangers in the Indoor Professional Football League (IPFL) in 2000 when they replaced the Louisiana Bayou Beast. As the Rangers, they played their home games at the Rapides Parish Coliseum in Alexandria, Louisiana. After the league collapsed, the Rangers moved into the National Indoor Football League (NIFL). After two seasons, the franchise moved to Beaumont, Texas, and became the Drillers. The team left the NIFL in 2008 and played in the American Professional Football League in 2008 with new ownership. The team played most of their schedule, cancelling two home games. The team played in APFL Bowl VI, because of the Conroe Storm withdrawing, but lost.

Former Drillers Shockmain Davis, Pat Palmer and Chad Luttrell all spent time playing in the NFL.

== Season-by-season ==
Season records
Season	W	L	T	Finish	Playoff results
Louisiana Rangers (IPFL)
2000	9	7	0	5th League	—
Louisiana Rangers (NIFL)
2001	5	9	0	5th Atlantic Southern	—
2002	8	6	0	1st Atlantic Eastern	Lost Round 1 (Ohio Valley)
Beaumont Drillers (NIFL)
2003	6	8	0	4th Atlantic Southern	—
2004	8	6	0	3rd Atlantic Southern	—
2005	5	9	0	3rd Pacific Southern	Lost Round 1 (Odessa)
2006	8	6	0	2nd Pacific Southern	Lost Round 1 (Katy)
2007	6	2	0	1st Pacific Southern	—
Beaumont Drillers (APFL)
2008	6	5	0	2nd Southern	Lost APFL Bowl VI
Totals	61	58	0	(including playoffs)	

== 2000 Louisiana Rangers IPFL schedule ==
- Week 1 – Louisiana Rangers 36, at Portland Prowlers 52
- Week 2 – Mobile Seagulls 29, at Louisiana Rangers 43
- Week 3 – Louisiana Rangers 42, at Shreveport-Bossier Bombers 29
- Week 4 – Bye
- Week 5 – Mississippi Fire Dogs 37, at Louisiana Rangers 50
- Week 6 – Shreveport-Bossier Bombers 19, at Louisiana Rangers 39
- Week 7 – Louisiana Rangers 40, at Omaha Beef 33
- Week 8 – Louisiana Rangers 32, at Mobile Seagulls 3
- Week 9 – Portland Prowlers 61, at Louisiana Rangers 55
- Week 10 – Mississippi Fire Dogs 56, at Louisiana Rangers 44
- Week 11 – Louisiana Rangers 48, at Idaho Stallions 52
- Week 12 – Idaho Stallions 17, at Louisiana Rangers 54
- Week 13 – Bye
- Week 14 – Louisiana Rangers 34, at Mississippi Fire Dogs 53
- Week 15 – Louisiana Rangers 13, at Mobile Seagulls 21
- Week 16 – Louisiana Rangers 29, at Shreveport-Bossier Bombers 35
- Week 17 – Omaha Beef 27, at Louisiana Rangers 35
- Week 18 – Bye
- Week 19 – Shreveport-Bossier Bombers 35, at Louisiana Rangers 60
