= Omaha Beef =

American indoor football team

- Current season
Logo

General information
- Founded: 1999
- Headquartered: Liberty First Credit Union Arena in Omaha, Nebraska
- Colors: Orange, black, silver
- Mascot: Sir Loin
- BeefFootball.com

Personnel
- Owners: Ricky Bertz; Craig Tirey
- General manager: Tony Doremus
- Head coach: Pat Pimmel

Team history
- Omaha Beef (2000–present)

Home fields
- Omaha Civic Auditorium (2000–2012); Liberty First Credit Union Arena (2013–present)

League / conference affiliations
- Indoor Professional Football League (2000–2001); National Indoor Football League (2002–2004); Pacific Conference (2002–2004); Northern Division (2002–2004); United Indoor Football (2005–2008); Western Division (2006–2008); Indoor Football League (2009–2012); United Conference (2009–2012); Central Division (2009); Central West Division (2010); Great Plains Division (2011); Champions Professional Indoor Football League (2013–2014); Champions Indoor Football (2015–2023); Northern Division (2016); North Conference (2017–2019); National Arena League (2024–present)

Championships
- League championships: 3: CIF: 2021, 2023; NAL: 2024
- Conference championships: 1: CIF: 2017
- Division championships: 3: IPFL: 2001; NIFL: 2003; NAL: 2025

Playoff appearances (21)
- IPFL: 2000, 2001; NIFL: 2002, 2003, 2004; UIF: 2005, 2006, 2007, 2008, IFL: 2009, 2010, 2011; CPIFL: 2013; CIF: 2017, 2019, 2021, 2022, 2023; NAL: 2024, 2025, 2026

The Omaha Beef are a professional indoor football team based in Omaha, Nebraska. The Beef plays their home games at Liberty First Credit Union Arena in nearby Ralston. The Beef competes in the National Arena League (NAL). The Beef has been a member of several leagues, including being a charter member of Champions Indoor Football (CIF).

== History ==
=== Early years (2000–2008) ===
Omaha originally played in the Indoor Professional Football League (IPFL) in 2000 and 2001 as an expansion team. The Beef made the playoffs their first and second seasons, advancing to the 2001 IPFL Championship.

The IPFL folded after the 2001 season and the Beef moved to the National Indoor Football League (NIFL) on October 10, 2001. After three seasons in the NIFL, the Beef joined the United Indoor Football (UIF) in 2005 as a charter member.

=== Indoor Football League and organizational instability (2008–2012) ===
In 2008, the UIF merged with the Intense Football League to create the Indoor Football League (IFL). From 2009 to 2011, the organization went through several general manager and head coaching changes, but still finished near the top of the league. In 2009, James Kerwin was head coach of the Beef and led the team to a 12–2 record and to the second round of the IFL playoffs. The Beef continued their consecutive playoff qualification streak, which ended after 14 years across five leagues when the Beef failed to qualify for the playoffs in 2014.

The organization entered their thirteenth year of existence and fourth year as a member of the IFL in 2012. Despite constant expansion and contraction changes within the league, the Beef were a constant and competitive member. During the 2012 season, ownership of the team was then taken over by the league. The head coach was fired during season and several other changes were made to cut costs. Despite this, Andy Yost and James Kerwin took over as co-head coaches. The Beef finished in a tie for the last conference spot in the playoffs but did not qualify because of a lower point differential, resulting in the end of a 12-year playoff appearance streak.

=== Cornhusker Beef, Inc. ownership (2012–2018) ===
In December 2012, the Omaha Beef were bought by Cornhusker Beef, Inc. On December 6, 2012, the Beef announced the new ownership group composing of Rich Tokhiem, Gerard Daly, and Jim Tokhiem. In December 2012, the Omaha Beef was accepted by the Champions Professional Indoor Football League (CPIFL) to begin play in March 2013.

In their first season in the CPIFL, the Beef hired Andy Yost as head coach, who had finished the previous season as interim co-head coach. Yost led the Beef to a 10–2 record and qualified for the playoffs, as they finished second, in a three-way tie (Sioux City (1), Wichita (3)) in the league. The Beef fell to Wichita 31–25.

After leading the team to the playoffs in 2013, Yost moved from head coach to quarterback coach for the 2014 season. The Beef hired Steve Heimann as head coach and he coached the Beef to a win in their 2014 exhibition game. However, he then resigned before coaching a regular season game. The Beef promoted defensive coordinator Dan Thurin to head coach. The Beef finished with a record of 4–8, which was an all-time franchise worst at that time.

On January 7, 2015, the Beef announced that former Cornhusker and NFL veteran Cory Ross would be the head coach for the 2015 season. Ross previously coached the Lincoln Haymakers of the CPIFL, also owned by Beef owner Rich Tokhiem, which ceased operations after the 2014 season.

In 2015 season, the Beef started playing in Champions Indoor Football (CIF), created by the merger of the CPIFL with the Lone Star Football League (LSFL).

Omaha opened 2015 with their worst start in franchise history at 0–5. On April 1, defensive coordinator Demetrius Ross opined that the Beef's poor start was in part due to preparations beginning in January instead of October and that the coaches did not get to select the players that they wanted. The Beef finished the 2015 season with a record of 1–11, their worst record in franchise history. The Beef also finished in ninth place in the nine-team CIF, marking the first time the Beef ever finished last in a league. In their 11 losses, the Beef lost by an average of 25.0 points per game, were last in the league in points with given up at 672 (56.0/game), points scored at 395 (32.9/game), and a turnover differential of –16.

In 2016, the Omaha Beef took advantage of their schedule to improve their record to 7–5. Omaha played six of their 12 games against first year franchises (Chicago Eagles and Salina Liberty) in which the Beef recorded five of their seven wins. Omaha only had one win over a team with a winning record when they played (Wichita Force 4–1 on April 16) and only played three games all season against teams that came into the contest with a winning record. In the Beef's seven wins, the opponent's combined 2016 records were 29–54. Despite playoff expansion for the CIF in 2016, where half of all teams in the league qualified for the playoffs, the Beef failed to make the playoffs for the third year in a row, the longest playoff drought in franchise history.

The 2017 season saw the team return to the playoffs. The Beef took advantage of an again increased playoff field, where the top four of seven division teams qualified for the playoffs, a schedule with five of 12 games against first-year expansion teams and a division with three, first-year expansion teams, to qualify for the 2017 playoffs. Omaha was outscored by their opponents during the regular season and only played four games against teams with winning records at the time of the game, winning only one (Bloomington on March 18) and dropping three (Sioux City on March 31, Sioux City on May 27, and Dallas on June 3). Omaha's seven regular season wins came against teams with a combined 2017 record of 25–59. The Beef's wins during the 2016 and 2017 seasons came against teams with a combined 54–113 record. Omaha qualified as the North Division representative for the CIF Championship game. The South division saw six of the seven teams post winning regular season records as the Texas Revolution came out of the tougher division for the Champions Bowl III bid. Texas controlled most of the championship game, never trailing. The Revolution played conservatively in the fourth quarter, with a 30-point lead to defeat the Beef 59–49 and claim the league title.

Prior to the 2018 season, and for the second time under this ownership, after qualifying for the playoffs, the head coach left the position before the following season. On August 16, 2017, head coach Cory Ross was announced as the head coach for the CIF expansion Quad City Steamwheelers. Victor Mann was named head coach, who had led the Texas Revolution to the league championship in 2017. Despite being a centerpiece in the Beef's off-season marketing campaign, days before the opening of the 2018 season, the Omaha Beef announced that Mike Bonner would be head coach for the upcoming season with Mann never coaching a game for the Beef. Four games into the 2018 season, though a public announcement was not made by the organization at the time, players confirmed that Mike Bonner was removed from the head coach position and Rod Miller, the assistant head coach and former Beef head coach, was appointed head coach before Omaha's fifth game of the season. Bonner was head coach for only four games, posting a 1–3 record, including losing the last three by a combined five points. Miller became the seventh person to hold the position over the previous six seasons. Midway through the season, Omaha suspended starting quarterback Anthony Iannotti. Iannotti led the Beef to the 2017 Champions Bowl, where he started 14 out of 15 games. Iannotti was later released. Omaha finished the season losing four out of the last five games and posting a 4–8 record, tied for second worst in franchise history with the 2014 season. The Beef failed to qualify for the playoffs for the fourth time in five seasons, the longest stretch in franchise history.

=== Ricky Bertz and Craig Tirey ownership (2018–present) ===
During the 2018 offseason, the Beef were for sale. On October 24, 2018, the Beef announced the new owners as Ricky Bertz, a founder of the CIF, and Craig Tirey. On November 6, 2018, the Beef announced that James Kerwin would return as head coach for the 2019 season.

In July 2023, after winning two of the three previous CIF championships, the Beef announced they were leaving the CIF for a new league along with the Sioux City Bandits and the Topeka Tropics. On August 9, 2023, the team announced they had joined the National Arena League (NAL) beginning with the 2024 season.

From the time of their loss in the 2022 CIF Championship Game, the Beef went on a two-year winning streak, going undefeated for two consecutive years, en route to the 2023 CIF Championship and 2024 NAL Championship. The streak ended on March 2, 2025, when, in a "dramatic" upset, the semi-professional Minneapolis Warriors defeated the Beef 24–23 on a last-second, game-winning touchdown pass. On April 3, 2025, the Beef announced on their Facebook page that they had parted ways with head coach Mike Tatum and offensive coordinator James Jerry. On April 7, 2025, the Beef announced former Carolina Cobras head coach and general manager Brandon Negron had been named the team's new head coach. After a tumultuous season, the Beef still finished the regular season at 8-1 and advanced to the 2025 NAL Championship attempting to win three championships in a row and four in the previous six post-seasons. The Beef would be upset by the upstart Beaumont Renegades 29-37.

On April 5, 2026, after an 0-4 start, head coach Brandon Negron resigned (then joined the independent Wyoming Cavalry) and on April 10th, assistant coach Adam Loftis was promoted to interim head coach.

On August 29, 2026, during Fan Fest, the Omaha Beef introduced Pat Pimmel as head coach.

== Rivalries ==
=== Sioux City Bandits ===
Known as the "I-29 Rivalry," the Beef and the Sioux City Bandits have been rivals since their time in the National Indoor Football League (NIFL) starting in 2002, becoming one of indoor football's oldest rivalries, the only breaks in their rivalry coming in 2011 and 2012 during the Bandit's two years in the American Professional Football League (APFL) and again in 2020 when the CIF season was cancelled due to the COVID-19 pandemic. As of 2025, the Beef hold a series lead of 31–24 and the teams have met five times in the postseason. The Beef won the 2004 meeting, 46–40 in a game that was host to controversy related to fan interference, before falling to the Billings Outlaws in a 59–68 shootout in the very next round. Thirteen years and four different leagues came between the two I-29 adversaries until the 2017 postseason, as the Beef prevailed over the Bandits to claim the 2017 North Conference championship with a 55-45 victory, but lost the championship to the Texas Revolution in Champions Bowl III 59–49. Omaha defeated Sioux City 47-46 in an epic double overtime thriller in the 2024 NAL Championship game in Raslton.

=== Sioux Falls Storm ===
Dating back to the Beef's time in the NIFL, United Indoor Football (UIF), and Indoor Football League (IFL), the rivalry with the Sioux Falls Storm was one-sided with the Storm holding a 17–6 series lead (including three postseason victories). However, during the 2008 season, the Beef defeated the Storm 34–18 and ended the Storm's then-record 40 game winning streak, which had begun with a 51–41 win over the Beef in the 2005 season. The rivalry came to an end after the conclusion of the 2012 season, when the Beef left to form the Champions Professional Indoor Football League.

=== Billings Outlaws ===
The Billings Outlaws held a 12–3 series lead over the Beef before folding after the conclusion of the 2010 season. The rivalry was renewed over a decade later after a new Outlaws franchise joined the CIF for the 2022 season. Since then, the Beef have a 3–1 series lead, including a 42–6 win in the 2023 CIF playoffs to secure their third straight Champions Bowl appearance. The teams no longer meet, as the Omaha Beef joined the NAL, and the Billings Outlaws joined the AFL, in 2024.

=== Salina Liberty ===
The 2020s has seen a new rivalry emerge for the Beef in the form of the Salina Liberty. From 2021 to 2023, the league's championship games have been played by the Beef and the Liberty. As of 2023, the Beef have a 10–7 series lead over Salina. The two teams have an even a 2–2 record in the postseason, with Omaha, winning Champions Bowl VI and Champions Bowl VIII, and Salina winning Champions Bowl VII . The teams didn't meet for a few years, as the Omaha Beef joined the NAL, and the Salina Liberty joined the AFL, in 2024 but resumed playing each other when the Liberty joined the NAL in 2026 .

== Season-by-season ==
League champions	Conference champions	Division champions	Playoff berth	League leader

Season	Team	League	Conference	Division	Regular season			Postseason results
Season	Team	League	Conference	Division	Finish	Wins	Losses	Postseason results
2000	2000	IPFL			3rd	8	8	Lost Semifinal (Mississippi) 40–43
2001	2001	IPFL			1st	15	1	Lost 2001 IPFL Championship (Tennessee) 38–47
2002	2002	NIFL	Pacific	Northern	2nd	9	6	Lost Divisional (Bismarck) 40–69
2003	2003	NIFL	Pacific	Northern	1st	12	4	Won Divisional (Bismarck) 72–46; Lost Pacific Conference Championship (Utah) 51–62
2004	2004	NIFL	Pacific	Northern	2nd	9	5	Won Wild Card (Sioux City) 46–40; Lost Divisional (Billings) 59–68
2005	2005	UIF		Northern	2nd	9	6	Lost Divisional (Sioux Falls) 41–51
2006	2006	UIF		Western	2nd	8	7	Lost Wild Card (Evansville) 15–37
2007	2007	UIF		Western	3rd	8	7	Lost Divisional (Billings) 27–62
2008	2008	UIF		Western	3rd	10	4	Lost Wild Card (Billings) 30–47
2009	2009	IFL	United	Central	1st	11	3	Lost Divisional (Wichita) 34–37
2010	2010	IFL	United	Central West	2nd	9	5	Lost Wild Card (Sioux Falls) 23–42
2011	2011	IFL	United	Great Plains	2nd	9	5	Won Wild Card (Bloomington) 39–34; Lost Divisional (Sioux Falls) 39–52
2012	2012	IFL	United		5th	6	8	
2013	2013	CPIFL			2nd	10	2	Lost Semifinals (Wichita) 25–31
2014	2014	CPIFL			7th	4	8	
2015	2015	CIF			9th	1	11	
2016	2016	CIF		Northern	4th	7	5	
2017	2017	CIF	North		2nd	7	5	Won Northern Semifinals (Bloomington) 43–30; Won Northern Championship (Sioux City) 55–45; Lost Champions Bowl III (Texas) 49–59
2018	2018	CIF	North		5th	4	8	
2019	2019	CIF	North		2nd	8	4	Lost Northern Championship (Salina) 42–44
2020	2020	CIF			Season cancelled due to the COVID-19 pandemic			
2021	2021	CIF			2nd	6	4	Won Semifinal (Sioux City) 40–39; Won Champions Bowl VI (Salina) 40–39
2022	2022	CIF			2nd	7	3	Won Quarterfinal (Southwest Kansas) 27–21; Won Semifinal (Sioux City) 49–45; Lost Champions Bowl VII (Salina) 34–38
2023	2023	CIF			1st	10	0	Won Semifinal (Billings) 42–6; Won Champions Bowl VIII (Salina) 50–30
2024	2024	NAL			1st	8	0	Won NAL Championship (Sioux City) 47-46 (2OT)
2025	2025	NAL		National	1st	8	1	Won Semifinal (Colorado) 71–54; Lost 2025 NAL Championship (Beaumont) 29-37
2026	2026	NAL			6th	5	5	Won Quarterfinal (Sioux City) 47–36; Lost Semifinal (SWK) 31-51
Totals						209	126	All-time regular season record
Totals						14	18	All-time postseason record
Totals						223	144	All-time regular season and postseason record

== Players ==
=== Awards and honors ===
The following is a list of all Beef players who have won league Awards

Season	Player	Position	Award
2010	Ben Sankey	QB	Offensive Player of the Year
2012	Peter Buck	LB	Defensive Rookie of the Year
2021	Andrew Jackson	QB	Offensive Player of the Year
2021	Ziah Gibson	DE	Defensive Rookie of the year
2023	Tommy Armstrong Jr.	QB	League MVP
2024	Tommy Armstrong Jr.	QB	League MVP

=== Omaha Beef Hall of Fame ===
#	Honoree	Position	Tenure	Honored
	Jim & Judy Klimshot	Owners/Founders	2000–03	2023
	Sandy Buda	Head Coach	2000–03	2023
	Troy Travis	DB	2000–02	2023
	Dwayne Harris	DL	2002–05	2023
3	James McNear	QB	2007-13	2023
	Dan Potmesil	OL	2002–09,11-12	2023
51	Kris "Moose" Orr	Rump Roaster	2003–21	2023
	Samantha Lucille	Prime Dancer		2023
	RJ Rollins	Running Back	2006-2013	2024
	Chad Mustard	OL/TE/WR	2002	2024
	Matt LaFleur	QB	2003	2024
	Brandon Stewart	K	2002,11,14,23	2024
	Pat Kenison	Fan		2024
	James Kerwin	Head Coach / Coach	2005-13, 2019	2025
	Cortney Grixby	DB / KR	2009-12, 2014	2025
	Alan Burrell	WR / DB	2005-06, 2009, 2011-12	2025
	Javon Bell	WR	2008-10, 2019	2025
	Jim Kelter	Broadcast / Media	2000-05	2025
10	Tommy Armstrong	QB	2023-25	2026
	Clinton Childs	RB/WR	2000-03	2026
	Don Igo	GM	2001	2026
	Dr. Peter Cimino	Team Doctor	2000-26	2026

== Non-player personnel ==
The Beef organization have the only all-male dance team in indoor football, the Rump Roasters, along with a dance team, the Prime dancers. The Prime dancers have won several awards including the best dance team three times in the UIF and 2009 dance team of the year in the IFL. They are ambassadors for the Beef organization as well and perform in conjunction with the Rumproasters. The Prime were named Dance team of the Year once again for 2012.

The mascot for the Beef is an Angus bull named Sir Loin. He won mascot of the year three times in UIF and was named 2009 Mascot of the year in the IFL. He was named Mascot of the Year for 2011 and again in 2012.

=== Head coaches ===
Name	Tenure	Total					Regular Season					Postseason					Titles		
Name	Tenure	W	L	Win%	Home	Away	W	L	Win%	Home	Away	W	L	Win%	Home	Away	DIV	CONF	CHAMP
Sandy Buda	2000–2003	45	23	.662	—	—	44	19	.698	—	—	1	4	.200	—	—	1	0	0
Colin Sanders	2004	10	6	.625	—	—	9	5	.643	—	—	1	1	.500	—	—	0	0	0
Robert Fuller	2005–2006	17	15	.531	—	—	17	13	.567	—	—	0	2	.000	—	—	0	0	0
Rod Miller	2007, 2018	11	13	.458	—	—	11	12	.478	—	—	0	1	.000	—	—	0	0	0
Steve Warren	2008	10	5	.667	(6–1)	(4–4 )	10	4	.714	(6–1)	(4–3)	0	1	.000	—	(0–1)	0	0	0
James Kerwin	2009, 2019	19	9	.679	—	—	19	7	.731	—	—	0	2	.000	—	—	1	0	0
Bruce Cowdrey	2010–2012	25	20	.556	—	—	24	18	.571	—	—	1	2	.333	—	—	0	0	0
Andy Yost	2013	10	3	.769	—	—	10	2	.833	—	—	0	1	.000	—	—	0	0	0
Dan Thurin	2014	4	8	.333	—	—	4	8	.333	—	—	0	0	–	—	—	0	0	0
Cory Ross	2015–2017	17	22	.436	—	—	15	21	.417	—	—	2	1	.667	—	—	0	1	0
Mike Bonner	2018	1	3	.250	—	—	1	3	.250	—	—	0	0	–	—	—	0	0	0
Marvin Jones	2021–2022	17	8	.680	—	—	13	7	.650	—	—	4	1	.800	—	—	0	0	1
Rayshaun Kizer	2023	12	0	1.000	(7–0)	(5–0)	10	0	1.000	(5–0)	(5–0)	2	0	1.000	(2–0)	(0–0)	0	0	1
Mike Tatum	2024–2025	12	0	1.000	(8–0)	(4–0)	11	0	1.000	(7–0)	(4–0)	1	0	1.000	(1–0)	(0–0)	0	0	1
Brandon Negron	2025–2026	5	6	.455	(3–2)	(2–4)	4	5	.444	(2–2)	(2–3)	1	1	.500	(1–0)	(0–1)	1	0	0
Adam Loftis (Int.)	2026	6	2	.750	(3–0)	(3–2)	5	1	.833	(3–0)	(2–1)	1	1	.500	(0–0)	(1–1)	0	0	0
Pat Pimmel	2026–Present	0	0	–	(0–0)	(0–0)	0	0	–	(0–0)	(0–0)	0	0	–	(0–0)	(0–0)	0	0	0

== Past seasons ==
=== 2013 ===
Week	Date	Kickoff	Opponent	Results	
Week	Date	Kickoff	Opponent	Final score	Record
1	Bye				
2	March 17 (Sun)	2:00pm	at Kansas City Renegades	W 38–27	1–0
3	Bye				
4	March 29 (Fri)	7:30pm	Kansas Koyotes	W 54–27	2–0
5	April 7 (Sun)	7:30pm	Sioux City Bandits	W 32–26	3–0
6	April 13 (Sat)	7:05pm	at Lincoln Haymakers	W 55–49	4–0
7	April 20 (Sat)	7:05pm	at Wichita Wild	L 17–29	4–1
8	April 27 (Sat)	7:05pm	at Sioux City Bandits	W 38–24	5–1
9	May 5 (Sun)	7:30pm	Mid-Missouri Outlaws	W 68–13	6–1
10	May 11 (Sat)	7:30pm	Lincoln Haymakers	W 27–23	7–1
11	May 17 (Fri)	7:05pm	at Bloomington Edge	W 51–33	8–1
12	May 24 (Sat)	4:30pm	Oklahoma Defenders	W 59–21	9–1
13	June 1 (Sat)	7:05pm	at Lincoln Haymakers	W 34–24	10–1
14	June 7 (Fri)	7:30pm	Kansas City Renegades	L 27–42	10–2
Playoffs
	June 14 (Fri)	7:00pm	Wichita Wild	L 25–31	10–3

=== 2014 ===
Week	Date	Kickoff	Opponent	Results	
Week	Date	Kickoff	Opponent	Final score	Record
1	March 2 (Sun)	3:00pm	Dodge City Law	L 35–61	0–1
2	March 9 (Sun)	3:00pm	Kansas Koyotes	W 55–27	1–1
3	Bye				
4	March 22 (Sat)	7:05pm	Lincoln Haymakers	L 20–59	1–2
5	March 29 (Sun)	7:05pm	at Bloomington Edge	W 70–69	2–2
6	April 5 (Sat)	7:05pm	at Kansas Koyotes	W 52–30	3–2
7	April 11 (Sat)	7:05pm	Sioux City Bandits	L 55–61	3–3
8	April 19 (Sat)	7:05pm	Wichita Wild	L 33–66	3–4
9	Bye				
10	May 3 (Sat)	7:05pm	at Dodge City Law	L 20–60	3–5
11	May 10 (Sat)	7:05pm	at Sioux City Bandits	L 47–61	3–6
12	May 16 (Fri)	7:05pm	at Lincoln Haymakers	L 56–67	3–7
13	May 24 (Sat)	7:05pm	Bloomington Edge	W 80–69	4–7
14	May 31 (Sat)	7:05pm	at Salina Bombers	L 43–50	4–8
15	Bye				

=== 2018 ===
Week	Date	Kickoff	Opponent	Results	
Week	Date	Kickoff	Opponent	Final score	Record
1	March 10 (Sat)	7:05pm	Salina Liberty	W 42–37	1–0
2	March 16 (Fri)	7:05pm	at Kansas City Phantoms	L 61–62	1–1
3	March 24 (Sat)	7:05pm	Sioux City Bandits	L 30–33	1–2
4	Bye				
5	April 7 (Sat)	7:05pm	at Bismarck Bucks	L 32–33	1–3
6	April 14 (Sat)	7:05pm	at Salina Liberty	L 43–69	1–4
7	April 21 (Sat)	7:05pm	Kansas City Phantoms	W 47–41	2–4
8	April 28 (Sat)	7:05pm	Quad City Steamwheelers	W 47–36	3–4
9	May 5 (Sat)	7:05pm	at Sioux City Bandits	L 40–51	3–5
10	May 12 (Sat)	7:05pm	at Bismarck Bucks	W 79–78	4–5
11	May 19 (Sat)	7:05pm	at Quad City Steamwheelers	L 36–58	4–6
12	May 26 (Sat)	7:05pm	Sioux City Bandits	L 31–77	4–7
13	June 2 (Sat)	7:05pm	Bismarck Bucks	L 38–41 (OT)	4–8

=== 2019 ===
Week	Date	Kickoff	Opponent	Results	
Week	Date	Kickoff	Opponent	Final score	Record
1	March 23 (Sat)	7:05pm	Oklahoma Flying Aces	W 59–55	1–0
2	Bye				
3	April 6 (Sat)	7:05pm	at Sioux City Bandits	L 32–43	1–1
4	April 13 (Sat)	7:05pm	Wichita Force	W 44–21	2–1
5	Bye				
6	April 27 (Sat)	7:05pm	Texas Revolution	W 48–34	3–1
7	May 4 (Sat)	7:05pm	at Oklahoma Flying Aces	W 42–23	4–1
8	May 13 (Mon)	7:05pm	at Texas Revolution	W 2–0 (forfeit)	5–1
9	May 18 (Sat)	7:05pm	at Wichita Force	W 70–33	6–1
10	May 25 (Sat)	7:05pm	Oklahoma Flying Aces	W 71–51	7–1
11	June 1 (Sat)	7:05pm	at Salina Liberty	L 34–54	7–2
12	June 10 (Mon)	7:05pm	at Amarillo Venom	L 42–45	7–3
13	June 15 (Sat)	7:05pm	Salina Liberty	L 33–50	7–4
14	June 22 (Sat)	7:05pm	Sioux City Bandits	W 60–50	8–4
Playoffs
	June 29 (Sat)	6:30pm	at Salina Liberty	L 42–44	

=== 2020 ===
Week	Date	Kickoff	Opponent	Results	
Week	Date	Kickoff	Opponent	Final score	Record
PS	March 7 (Sat)	6:35pm	Metro Militia	W 58–1	0–0
1	March 21 (Sat)	7:00pm	at Sioux City Bandits	Cancelled	
2	March 28 (Sat)	6:35pm	Wichita Force	Cancelled	
3	April 4 (Sat)	7:00pm	at West Texas Warbirds	Cancelled	
4	April 11 (Sat)	7:00pm	at Oklahoma Flying Aces	Cancelled	
5	April 19 (Sun)	3:05pm	Salina Liberty	Cancelled	
6	Bye				
7	May 2 (Sat)	6:35pm	Amarillo Venom	Cancelled	
8	May 9 (Sat)	6:35pm	Wichita Force	Cancelled	
9	May 16 (Sat)	7:00pm	at Amarillo Venom	Cancelled	
10	May 23 (Sat)	6:35pm	Sioux City	Cancelled	
11	Bye				
12	June 6 (Sat)	7:00pm	@ Salina Liberty	Cancelled	
13	June 13 (Sat)	7:00pm	@ Wichita Force	Cancelled	
14	June 20 (Sat)	6:35pm	West Texas	Cancelled	

=== 2021 ===
Week	Date	Kickoff	Opponent	Results	
Week	Date	Kickoff	Opponent	Final score	Record
1	Bye				
2	April 10 (Sat)	6:35pm	at Salina Liberty	L 14–39	0–1
3	April 17 (Sat)	6:30pm	Sioux City Bandits	L 22–33	0–2
4	Bye				
5	May 2 (Sun)	4:05pm	at Sioux City Bandits	W 41–37	1–2
6	May 8 (Sat)	8:00pm	at Wyoming Mustangs	W 49–21	2–2
7	May 15 (Sat)	6:30pm	Wichita Force	L 31–41	2–3
8	May 22 (Sat)	6:30pm	Wyoming Mustangs	W 48–6	3–3
9	Bye				
10	June 5 (Sat)	7:05pm	at Dodge City Law	W 31–19	4–3
11	June 12 (Sat)	6:30pm	Salina Liberty	W 39–35	5–3
12	June 19 (Sat)	6:30pm	Dodge City Law	W 52–36	6–3
13	June 26 (Sat)	7:05pm	at Sioux City Bandits	L 28–35	6–4
Playoffs
	July 9 (Fri)	7:05pm	Sioux City Bandits	W 40–39	
	July 17 (Sat)	7:05pm	at Salina Liberty	W 40–39	

=== 2022 ===
Week	Date	Kickoff	Opponent	Results	
Week	Date	Kickoff	Opponent	Final score	Record
1	March 12 (Sat)	6:35pm	Southwest Kansas Storm	W 47–17	1–0
2	Bye				
3	March 26 (Sat)	6:35pm	at Salina Liberty	L 31–36	1–1
4	April 1 (Fri)	7:05pm	Wyoming Mustangs	W 82–34	2–1
5	April 9 (Sat)	8:05pm	at Wyoming Mustangs	W 56–40	3–1
6	Bye				
7	April 23 (Sat)	6:35pm	Billings Outlaws	L 41–48	3–2
8	April 30 (Sat)	7:05pm	at Sioux City Bandits	L 49–60	3–3
9	May 7 (Sat)	7:05pm	at Topeka Tropics	W 44–33	4–3
10	May 14 (Sat)	6:35pm	Salina Liberty	W 14–11	5–3
11	Bye				
12	May 30 (Mon)	8:35pm	at Rapid City Marshals	W 44–25	6–3
13	June 4 (Sat)	6:35pm	Topeka Tropics	W 42–21	7–3
Playoffs
	June 11 (Sat)	6:35pm	Southwest Kansas Storm	W 27–21	
	June 18 (Sat)	7:05pm	at Sioux City Bandits	W 49–45	
	June 25 (Sat)	6:35pm	at Salina Liberty	L 34–38	

=== 2023 ===
Week	Date	Kickoff	Opponent	Results	
Week	Date	Kickoff	Opponent	Final score	Record
1	Bye				
2	March 10 (Fri)	7:05pm	Billings Outlaws	W 47–19	1–0
3	March 18 (Sat)	6:35pm	at Southwest Kansas Storm	W 68–15	2–0
4	Bye				
5	April 1 (Sat)	7:05pm	at Topeka Tropics	W 60–22	3–0
6	April 8 (Sat)	6:35pm	Gillette Mustangs	W 51–29	4–0
7	April 15 (Sat)	6:35pm	at Salina Liberty	W 36–31	5–0
8	April 22 (Sat)	8:35pm	at Billings Outlaws	W 45–12	6–0
9	April 29 (Sat)	6:35pm	Rapid City Marshals	W 63–12	7–0
10	May 6 (Sat)	7:05pm	at Sioux City Bandits	W 48–45	8–0
11	May 13 (Sat)	6:35pm	Topeka Tropics	W 66–13	9–0
12	Bye				
13	May 27 (Sat)	6:35pm	Sioux City Bandits	W 44–15	10–0
Playoffs
	Bye				
	June 10 (Sat)	6:35pm	Billings Outlaws	W 42–6	
	June 17 (Sat)	6:35pm	Salina Liberty	W 50–30	

=== 2024 ===
Week	Date	Kickoff	Opponent	Results	
Week	Date	Kickoff	Opponent	Final score	Record
1	Bye				
2	March 24 (Sun)	2:05pm	at Carolina Cobras	W 54–43	1–0
3	March 30 (Sat)	6:35pm	Colorado Spartans	W 45–32	2–0
4	Bye				
5	Bye				
6	April 19 (Fri)	7:05pm	Idaho Horsemen	W 63–14	3–0
5	Bye				
8	May 4 (Sat)	6:35pm	Oklahoma Flying Aces	W 42–36	4–0
9	May 11 (Sat)	6:35pm	Sioux City Bandits	W 33–6	5–0
10	May 18 (Sat)	7:05pm	at Sioux City Bandits	W 34–32	6–0
11	Bye				
12	June 1 (Sat)	8:05pm	at Colorado Spartans	W 54–34	7–0
13	June 8 (Sat)	6:35pm	Carolina Cobras	W 54–31	8–0
Playoffs
	June 15 (Sat)	6:35pm	Sioux City Bandits	W 47–46 (2OT)	9–0

=== 2025 ===
Week	Date	Kickoff	Opponent	Results	
Week	Date	Kickoff	Opponent	Final score	Record
1	March 8 (Sat)	7:00pm	at Shreveport Rouxgaroux	W 41-18	1-0
2	March 15 (Sat)	6:35pm	Colorado Spartans	W 33-12	2-0
3	Bye				
4	March 29 (Sat)	6:35pm	Idaho Horsemen	W 28-24	3-0
5	Bye				
6	April 13 (Sun)	6:05pm	at Beaumont Renegades	L 31-36	3-1
5	April 19 (Sat)	6:35pm	Sioux City Bandits	W 24-17	4-1
8	Bye				
9	May 3 (Sat)	6:35pm	Arlington Longhorns (Non-League)	W 70-0	5-1
10	May 10 (Sat)	7:10pm	at Sioux City Bandits	W 55-42	6-1
11	Bye				
12	May 24 (Sat)	6:35pm	Shreveport Rouxgaroux	W 47-12	7-1
13	May 31 (Sat)	8:05pm	at Colorado Spartans	W 35-34	8-1
Playoffs
	June 7 (Sat)	6:35pm	Colorado Spartans	W 71-54	
	June 14 (Sat)	6:35pm	at Beaumont Renegades	L 29-37	

=== 2026 ===
Week	Date	Kickoff	Opponent	Results	
Week	Date	Kickoff	Opponent	Final score	Record
1	March 14 (Sat)	6:35pm	Pueblo Punishers	L 31-44	0-1
2	March 21 (Sat)	6:30pm	at Salina Liberty	L 22-60	0-2
3	March 28 (Sat)	6:00pm	at Southwest Kansas Storm	L 26-34	0-3
4	April 4 (Sat)	6:35pm	Sioux City Bandits	L 6-26	0-4
5	Bye				
6	April 18 (Sun)	8:00pm	at Colorado Spartans	L 28-45	0-5
7	April 25 (Sat)	6:35pm	Dallas Bulls	W 52-18	1-5
8	Bye				
9	May 9 (Sat)	6:30pm	Louisiana Rouxgaroux	W 52-6	2-5
10	May 16 (Sat)	7:10pm	at Sioux City Bandits	W 41-37	3-5
11	May 23 (Sat)	6:35pm	Colorado Spartans	W 30-27	4-5
12	May 30 (Sat)	6:05pm	at Louisiana Rouxgaroux	W 63-33	5-5
Playoffs
	June 6 (Sat)	7:10pm	at Sioux City Bandits	W 47-36	
	June 13 (Sat)	6:05pm	at Southwest Kansas Storm	L 31-51	
