= Indoor Professional Football League =

Indoor American football league

- Infobox Sports league
- Formerly: Professional Indoor Football League
- Sport: Indoor football
- Founded: 1998
- Founder: Richard "Dick" Suess
- First season: 1999
- Folded: 2001
- CEO: Mike Storen
- Claim to fame: 3rd professional indoor football league
- Motto: Great Football, No Gimmicks.
- No. of teams: 6
- Country: United States
- Last champion: Tennessee ThunderCats
- Most titles: Hawaii Hammerheads (1999); Mississippi Fire Dogs (2000); Tennessee ThunderCats (2001)
- Website: www.indoorfootball.com

The Indoor Professional Football League (IPFL) was the new incarnation of the Professional Indoor Football League (PIFL), which started in 1998. Two of its teams (the Madison Mad Dogs and the Green Bay Bombers) left the league and their owner, Kerry Ecklund, founded the IPFL in 1999. The IPFL led a troubled three-year existence, and died after its 2001 season, with its most successful teams joining up with the National Indoor Football League.

The IPFL was unique among indoor football leagues in that it sanctioned the use of a white football, manufactured by Rawlings, which was easier to see in the artificial lighting conditions. The league's slogan was "Great Football, No Gimmicks".

In 1999, IPFL was headed by a new commissioner, Mike Storen, and the league offices were moved to Atlanta.

== IPFL 1999 teams ==
Before the Pro Indoor Football League folded, the league was looking into replacing the two folded franchises of Minnesota and Texas and expanding the league back to 8 teams, or even beyond, to 10 or 12, for what was supposed to be its second season. However, the league took a major hit when Madison and Green Bay left the league to form a new league called the Indoor Football League. This left the league with only four teams: Honolulu, Utah, Colorado and Louisiana. The Utah Catzz soon folded as well, leading to the demise of the Pro Indoor Football League. The Pro Indoor Football League was re-formed as the Indoor Professional Football League and the three remaining clubs from the old league; the Hawaii Hammerheads (formerly Honolulu Hurricanes), the Rocky Mountain (Colorado Springs) Thunder (formerly Colorado (Denver) Wildcats) and the Louisiana Bayou Beast were joined by three new franchises in Boise, Idaho; Biloxi, Mississippi; and Austin, Texas. The league was going to have 8 clubs, but the Arizona (Tucson) Mirage and the Syracuse Blitz folded.

1. Texas Terminators, 12–4
2. Hawaii Hammerheads, 10–6
3. Mississippi Fire Dogs, 9–7
4. Idaho Stallions, 6–10
5. Louisiana Bayou Beast, 6–10
6. Rocky Mountain Thunder, 5–11

Semifinal			Final
			1	Hawaii	28
2	Hawaii	36	2	Texas	13
3	Mississippi	16

== IPFL 2000 teams ==
During the off season, the Indoor Professional Football League saw major changes with the loss of three of its charter franchises: Rocky Mountain, Hawaii and Texas. However, the league saw the addition of four new franchises with the fourth new addition expanding the league beyond six franchises. The new clubs were Shreveport-Bossier City, Portland (OR), Omaha and Mobile. The Indoor Professional Football League approved the relocation of the Baton Rouge-based Louisiana Bayou Beast to Alexandria, Louisiana and announced the team would be known as the Louisiana Rangers. The Bayou Beast's relocation to Alexandria left the league with no club still remaining in its city that it started operations in. Mississippi defeated Portland in the championship.

1. Portland Prowlers, 11–5
2. Mississippi Fire Dogs, 11–5
3. Omaha Beef, 8–8
4. Mobile Seagulls, 8–8
5. Louisiana Rangers, 9–7
6. Idaho Stallions, 5–11
7. Shreveport-Bossier Bombers, 5–11

The Fort Wayne Safari was announced as an expansion team for the 2002 season, which never occurred.

== IPFL 2001 teams ==
Team	W	L	Pct.
Omaha Beef	15	1	.938
Tennessee ThunderCats	12	4	.750
Boise Stallions	6	10	.375
St. Louis Renegades	5	11	.313
Trenton Lightning	0	16	.000

2001 IPFL Championship Game
2	Tennessee	47
1	Omaha	38

== Championships ==
=== By team ===
Team	Winner	Runner up	Winning years	Runner up years
Hawaii Hammerheads	1	0	1999	
Mississippi Fire Dogs	1	0	2000	
Tennessee ThunderCats	1	0	2001	
Texas Terminators	0	1		1999
Portland Prowlers	0	1		2000
Omaha Beef	0	1		2001
