= Mississippi Fire Dogs =

General information
- Founded: 1999
- Folded: 2002
- Headquartered: Biloxi, Mississippi at Mississippi Coast Coliseum
- Colors: Red, Orange, Yellow, Black

Team history
- Mississippi Fire Dogs (1999–2002)

Home fields
- Mississippi Coast Coliseum (1999–2002)

League / conference affiliations
- Indoor Professional Football League (1999–2000) National Indoor Football League (2001–2002)

The Mississippi Fire Dogs were a professional indoor American football team based in Biloxi, Mississippi. They played their home games at the Mississippi Coast Coliseum. They were a charter member of the Indoor Professional Football League. They played from in the 1999–2000 IPFL seasons before joining the National Indoor Football League in 2001. Their final season was in 2002.

== History ==
During their first two years, the Fire Dogs went 9–7 and third in the league, yet it was their third season that proved to be a glorious year by winning the IPFL championship title. When the IPFL folded, the Fire Dogs joined the new National Indoor Football League as a charter member and won the inaugural Indoor Bowl against the Wyoming Cavalry. However, they couldn't repeat the same success in 2002. Afterwards, the franchise folded.

During the 1999 & 2000 IPFL seasons, the most notable member for the Fire Dogs was head coach/general manager/player(QB) John Fourcade, formerly of the National Football League's New Orleans Saints. Fourcade was followed as head coach in 2001 & 2002 by Irvin Favre, the late father of legendary Green Bay Packers quarterback Brett Favre. Irvin Favre was also a minority owner for the Fire Dogs.

== 2000 IPFL Season ==
Week 1 – Mobile Seagulls 33, at Mississippi Fire Dogs 57

Week 2 – Portland Prowlers 42, Mississippi Fire Dogs 41

Week 3 – Idaho Stallions 35, at Mississippi Fire Dogs 22

Week 4 – Mississippi Fire Dogs 23, at Mobile Seagulls 30

Week 5 – Mississippi Fire Dogs 37, at Louisiana Rangers 50

Week 6 – bye

Week 7 – Shreveport-Bossier 17 at Mississippi Fire Dogs 57

Week 8 – bye

Week 9 – Mississippi Fire Dogs 51, at Idaho Stallions 28

Week 10 – Mississippi Fire Dogs 56, at Louisiana Rangers 44

Week 11 – Mobile Seagulls 40, at Mississippi Fire Dogs 30

Week 12 – Mississippi Fire Dogs 30, at Mobile Seagulls 16

Week 13 – Mississippi Fire Dogs 49, Omaha Beef 46

Week 14 – Louisiana Rangers 34, at Mississippi Fire Dogs 53

Week 15 – Mississippi Fire Dogs 39, Portland Prowlers 36

Week 16 – bye

Week 17 – Shreveport-Bossier 34 at Mississippi Fire Dogs 49

Week 18- Mississippi Fire Dogs 37 at Shreveport-Bossier 41

Week 19 – Omaha Beef 44, Mississippi Fire Dogs 38

Semifinals – Mississippi Fire Dogs 43, Omaha Beef 40

IPFL Championship – Mississippi Fire Dogs 53, Portland Prowlers 48

== Season-by-season ==
Season records
Season	W	L	T	Finish	Playoff results
Mississippi Fire Dogs (IPFL)
1999	9	7	0	3rd League	–
2000	9	7	0	2nd League	Won Semifinals (Omaha); Won IPFL Championship (Portland)
Mississippi Fire Dogs (NIFL)
2001	13	1	0	1st Southern Division	Won Round 1 (Johnstown); Won Semifinals (Ohio Valley); Won Indoor Bowl I (Wyoming)
2002	3	9	0	2nd Eastern Division	–
Totals	34	24	0		
