= 2014 Trenton Freedom season =

- Owner: Dennis Williams
- General manager: Megan Williams
- Head coach: Kevin O'Hanlon
- Home stadium: Sun National Bank Center

Results
- Record: 8–4
- Conference place: 1st
- Playoffs: Lost National Conference Championship (Lehigh Valley) 38–49

The 2014 Trenton Freedom season was the first season as a professional indoor football franchise and their first in the Professional Indoor Football League (PIFL). One of 8 teams that competed in the PIFL for the 2014 season.

In August 2013, Owners Dennis Williams and Michael Schubiger announced their intentions to bring an indoor football team back to Trenton, New Jersey. The owners held name the team contest, and picked the name "Freedom," as well as named Adam Turkel to be the team's first head coach and general manager. When looking for a league to play in, Williams and Schubiger both were lobbying to become members of the Professional Indoor Football League (PIFL). In September, the team officially became the 7th member of the PIFL for the 2014 season. In November 2013, the team announced that they were replacing Turkel with Kevin O'Hanlon as the team's inaugural coach.

The Freedom began their inaugural season on March 30, 2014 at home, defeating the Richmond Raiders 52–17. Quarterback Warren Smith threw for four touchdowns and ran for two more. Defensive Back Domonic Joseph was named PIFL Defensive Player of the Week. The Freedom lost their first road game, 48–47 at the Lehigh Valley Steelhawks. Wide receiver Antoine Rivera caught 13 passes for 132 yards and a pair of touchdowns.

The Freedom rebounded in their second home game for a 66–63 win over the Columbus Lions. The Freedom suffered their second road loss, 42–36 at Lehigh Valley April 26, but linebacker Jeffery Morgan earned the franchise's second PIFL Defensive Player of the Week honor by scoring a pair of touchdowns. Success continued at home May 3, as the Freedom rallied with 16 points in the last two minutes to edge Richmond, 33–32, with Marques Slocum earning PIFL Defensive Player of the Week. The winning trend at home continued May 11 with a 52–39 triumph over the Harrisburg Stampede as William Hollis was named PIFL Defensive Player of the week, the team's third straight selection.

With a 52–42 win at Richmond, May 17, the Freedom recorded the franchise's first-ever road victory. The following week, back at home, the Freedom avenged two earlier losses to Lehigh Valley with a 55–42 victory to push their record to a PIFL-best 6–2 atop the National Conference.

The Freedom, with a 57–49 win at Harrisburg June 7, clinched a PIFL playoff berth in its first season in moving to 7–2.

With a 49–47 comeback win over the defending PIFL champion Alabama Hammers June 14, the Freedom clinched the regular-season National Conference title and a home playoff game in the franchise's first season.

The Freedom dropped a 52–49 decision to the Georgia Fire in the team's final regular-season home game.

The Freedom finished the regular season with an 8–4 record, the 2nd best in the league, but were defeated by the Lehigh Valley Steelhawks in the National Conference Championship Game by a score of 49–38.

== Schedule ==
Key: Win Tie Loss Bye

=== Regular season ===
All start times are local to home team

Week	Day	Date	Kickoff	Opponent	Results		Location
Week	Day	Date	Kickoff	Opponent	Score	Record	Location
1	Sunday	March 30	2:05pm	Richmond Raiders	W 52–17	1–0	Sun National Bank Center
2	Sunday	April 6	4:00pm	at Lehigh Valley Steelhawks	L 47–48	1–1	Stabler Arena
3	BYE						
4	Saturday	April 19	7:05pm	Columbus Lions	W 66–63	2–1	Sun National Bank Center
5	Saturday	April 26	7:00pm	Lehigh Valley Steelhawks	L 36–42	2–2	Stabler Arena
6	Friday	May 3	7:05pm	Richmond Raiders	W 33–32	3–2	Sun National Bank Center
7	Sunday	May 11	4:00pm	Harrisburg Stampede	W 52–39	4–2	Sun National Bank Center
8	Saturday	May 17	7:05pm	at Richmond Raiders	W 52–42	5–2	Richmond Coliseum
9	Saturday	May 24	7:00pm	Lehigh Valley Steelhawks	W 55–42	6–2	Sun National Bank Center
10	BYE						
11	Friday	June 6	7:05pm	at Harrisburg Stampede	W 57–49	7–2	Giant Center
12	Saturday	June 14	7:00pm	at Alabama Hammers	W 49–47	8–2	Von Braun Center
13	Saturday	June 21	7:00pm	Georgia Fire	L 49–52	8–3	Sun National Bank Center
14	Saturday	June 28	7:15pm	at Nashville Venom	L 48–64	8–4	Nashville Municipal Auditorium

=== Postseason ===
All start times are local to home team

Round	Day	Date	Kickoff	Opponent	Results		Location
Round	Day	Date	Kickoff	Opponent	Score	Record	Location
National Conference Championship	Saturday	July 5	7:01pm	Lehigh Valley Steelhawks	L 38–49	0–1	Sun National Bank Center

== Roster ==
2014 Trenton Freedom roster
Quarterbacks: 11 Stephen Panasuk; 8 Warren Smith; Running backs: 6 Melik Brown; Wide receivers: 37 Norm Brown; 3 Roger Jackson; 4 Maurice McDonald; 2 Landis Williams	Offensive linemen: 50 Neil Brown; 72 Andre Civil; 76 Josh Kamenas; 75 Lavon McCoy; Defensive linemen: 95 Luqman Abdallah; 91 Trevor Anderson; 42 Gerrard Bryant; 12 Marell Evans; 92 William Hollis	Linebackers: 27 Jerome Hayes; 26 Jeffery Morgan; Defensive backs: 37 Bryan Andrews; 9 Jaquan Bryant; 5 Vaughn Carraway; 23 Dom Joseph; 1 Muhammad Shamsid-Deen; 21 Tristan Simms; 1 Kwaheem Smith; 24 Reggie Sullivan; 7 Christian Wise; Kickers: 10 Shawn Leo	Injured reserve: 46 John Mason DL (IR); 17 Antonio Rivera WR (IR); Exempt list: -- Keith Newell OL (Exempt); -- Jeremy Schonbrunner OL (Exempt); 90 Marques Slocum DL (Exempt); Failure to report: -- David Green OL (DNR); -- Kyle Johnson OL (DNR); -- Reggie Paramoure DL (DNR); Roster updated June 2, 2014; 28 Active, 8 Inactive → More rosters

== Division standings ==
2014 Professional Indoor Football League
Team	Overall				Conference			
Team	W	L	T	PCT	W	L	T	PCT
National Conference
y-Trenton Freedom	8	4	0	.667	6	2	0	.750
x-Lehigh Valley Steelhawks	6	6	0	.500	5	3	0	.625
Richmond Raiders	5	7	0	.417	3	5	0	.375
Harrisburg Stampede	4	8	0	.333	2	6	0	.250
American Conference
y-Nashville Venom	10	2	0	.833	6	2	0	.750
x-Columbus Lions	7	5	0	.583	5	3	0	.625
Georgia Fire	4	8	0	.333	3	5	0	.375
Alabama Hammers	4	8	0	.333	2	6	0	.250
