= 2014 Columbus Lions season =

- Owner: John Hargrove; Keith Norred; Kike Seda; Skip Seda; Rich Jacobson
- Head coach: Jason Gibson
- Home stadium: Columbus Civic Center

Results
- Record: 7–5
- Conference place: 2nd
- Playoffs: Lost American Conference Championship (Nashville) 39–44

The 2014 Columbus Lions season was the eighth season for the professional indoor football franchise and their third in the Professional Indoor Football League (PIFL). The Lions were one of eight teams that competed in the PIFL for the 2014 season.

The team played their home games under head coach Jason Gibson at the Columbus Civic Center in Columbus, Georgia. The Lions earned a 7–5 record, placing second in the league, falling to the Nashville Venom, 39–44, in the American Conference Championship.

== Schedule ==
Key: Win Tie Loss Bye

=== Regular season ===
All start times are local to home team

| Week | Day | Date | Kickoff | Opponent | Results | | Location |
| Week | Day | Date | Kickoff | Opponent | Score | Record | Location |
|---|---|---|---|---|---|---|---|
| 1 | Sunday | March 30 | 3:05pm | at Harrisburg Stampede | L 54–71 | 0–1 | Giant Center |
| 2 | Saturday | April 5 | 7:30pm | Richmond Raiders | W 42–21 | 1–0 | Columbus Civic Center |
| 3 | Friday | April 11 | 7:30pm | Georgia Fire | W 71–34 | 2–1 | Columbus Civic Center |
| 4 | Saturday | April 19 | 7:30pm | at Trenton Freedom | L 63–66 | 2–2 | Sun National Bank Center |
| 5 | Saturday | April 26 | 7:00pm | Georgia Fire | W 63–41 | 3–2 | Columbus Civic Center |
| 6 | BYE | | | | | | |
| 7 | BYE | | | | | | |
| 8 | Saturday | May 17 | 7:00pm | at Alabama Hammers | L 53–73 | 3–3 | Von Braun Center |
| 9 | Sunday | May 25 | 2:15pm | at Nashville Venom | L 44–58 | 3–4 | Nashville Municipal Auditorium |
| 10 | Saturday | May 31 | 7:00pm | Lehigh Valley Steelhawks | W 54–42 | 4–4 | Columbus Civic Center |
| 11 | Saturday | June 7 | 7:00pm | Alabama Hammers | W 39–31 | 5–4 | Columbus Civic Center |
| 12 | Saturday | June 14 | 7:00pm | Nashville Venom | L 56–60 | 5–5 | Columbus Civic Center |
| 13 | Saturday | June 21 | 7:30pm | at Alabama Hammers | W 69–31 | 6–5 | Von Braun Center |
| 14 | Friday | June 27 | 7:30pm | at Georgia Fire | W 69–55 | 7–5 | Forum Civic Center |

=== Postseason ===
| Round | Day | Date | Kickoff | Opponent | Results | | Location |
| Round | Day | Date | Kickoff | Opponent | Score | Record | Location |
|---|---|---|---|---|---|---|---|
| American Conference Championship | Saturday | July 5 | 3:05pm | at Nashville Venom | L 39–44 | 0–1 | Nashville Municipal Auditorium |

== Roster ==
2014 Columbus Lions roster
| Quarterbacks: 10 Barry Brunetti; 15 Luke Haplin; 20 Chris McCoy; Running backs: 24 Kendrick Perry; Wide receivers: 9 Earl Alexander; 9 Chris Davis; 6 Jarmon Fortson; 1 Gerald Gales; 5 Tirone Morris; 3 Cody Pearcy | Offensive linemen: 72 Adam Durham; -- Tim Moore; 58 Dion Small; 75 Brandon Thomas; Defensive linemen: 42 Rodney Gnat; 92 Lawon Scott; 34 Kendrick Washington; 13 Jerry Willis | Linebackers: 8 Ryan Babb; 34 Jamontay Pilson; 51 Justen Rivers; Defensive backs: 4 Damian Daniels; 10 Guesly Dervil; 11 Tito Hannah; 2 Roshawn Marshall; 22 Marvin Ross; Kickers: 7 Craig Camay | Injured reserve: Currently vacant; Refused to report - exempt: -- Steve Allen LB (DNR); -- Mike Beard LB (DNR); -- Brandon Horace WR (DNR); -- Damian Huren DB (DNR); -- Willie Pritchett OL (DNR); AFL - exempt: 5 Antwon Young QB (Exempt); CFL - exempt: 11 Danny O'Brien QB (Exempt); Suspended: Currently vacant; Practice squad: -- Mychal Bailey DB; 21 LeRoy Vann DB; Left squad: 15 Charles Gilbert WR (Left squad); -- Jordan Rideaux WR (Left squad); 56 Tyrell Zimmerman DL (Left squad); Rookies in italics Roster updated June 5, 2014; 26 Active, 12 Inactive → More rosters |

== Division standings ==
2014 Professional Indoor Football League
| Team | Overall | | | | Conference | | | |
| Team | W | L | T | PCT | W | L | T | PCT |
|---|---|---|---|---|---|---|---|---|
National Conference
| y-Trenton Freedom | 8 | 4 | 0 | .667 | 6 | 2 | 0 | .750 |
| x-Lehigh Valley Steelhawks | 6 | 6 | 0 | .500 | 5 | 3 | 0 | .625 |
| Richmond Raiders | 5 | 7 | 0 | .417 | 3 | 5 | 0 | .375 |
| Harrisburg Stampede | 4 | 8 | 0 | .333 | 2 | 6 | 0 | .250 |
American Conference
| y-Nashville Venom | 10 | 2 | 0 | .833 | 6 | 2 | 0 | .750 |
| x-Columbus Lions | 7 | 5 | 0 | .583 | 5 | 3 | 0 | .625 |
| Georgia Fire | 4 | 8 | 0 | .333 | 3 | 5 | 0 | .375 |
| Alabama Hammers | 4 | 8 | 0 | .333 | 2 | 6 | 0 | .250 |
