= 2014 Nashville Venom season =

2014 professional indoor football season

- Owner: Jeff Knight; Terry Burns
- General manager: Billy Back
- Head coach: Billy Back
- Home stadium: Nashville Municipal Auditorium

Results
- Record: 10-2
- Conference place: 1st
- Playoffs: Won American Conference Championship (Columbus) 44-39; Won PIFL Cup III (Lehigh Valley) 64-43

The 2014 Nashville Venom season was the first season as a professional indoor football franchise and their first in the Professional Indoor Football League (PIFL). The Venom were of eight teams competing in the PIFL for the 2014 season.

In November 2012, it was announced that the Venom would be the eighth and final team of the Professional Indoor Football League for the 2014 season. Unlike other teams in the American Conference of the new PIFL, the Venom were an entirely new team, not a continuation of a franchise in the former Southern Indoor Football. A few days after being introduced it was announced by Managing Partner Jeff Knight that Billy Back would be the first coach in Venom history. The Venom began their inaugural season on March 29, 2014, in Huntsville, Alabama against the Alabama Hammers. Their first home game was on April 5, against the Harrisburg Stampede. The Venom finished the regular season 10-2, the best record in the league, and won the American Conference regular season title. Their nine All-PIFL selected players were the most of any team. In the American Conference Championship Game, the Venom defeated the Columbus Lions 44-39 to advance to PIFL Cup III. On July 12, 2014, the Venom won their first PIFL Cup Championship, defeating the Lehigh Valley Steelhawks 64-43.

== Schedule ==
Key: Win Tie Loss Bye

=== Regular season ===
All start times are local to home team

Week	Day	Date	Kickoff	Opponent	Results		Location
Week	Day	Date	Kickoff	Opponent	Score	Record	Location
1	Saturday	March 29	7:00pm	at Alabama Hammers	W 57-40	1-0	Von Braun Center
2	Saturday	April 5	7:00pm	Harrisburg Stampede	W 40-31	2-0	Nashville Municipal Auditorium
3	BYE						
4	Friday	April 18	7:35pm	Alabama Hammers	W 59-29	3-0	Nashville Municipal Auditorium
5	BYE						
6	Saturday	May 3	7:30pm	at Georgia Fire	L 42-49	3-1	Forum Civic Center
7	Saturday	May 10	7:05pm	Georgia Fire	L 56-58	3-2	Nashville Municipal Auditorium
8	Saturday	May 17	7:00pm	at Lehigh Valley Steelhawks	W 53-38	4-2	Stabler Arena
9	Sunday	May 25	2:15pm	Columbus Lions	W 58-44	5-2	Nashville Municipal Auditorium
10	Monday	June 2	7:15pm	Alabama Hammers	W 59-45	6-2	Nashville Municipal Auditorium
11	Saturday	June 7	7:30pm	at Georgia Fire	W 73-39	7-2	Forum Civic Center
12	Saturday	June 14	7:00pm	at Columbus Lions	W 60-56	8-2	Columbus Civic Center
13	Saturday	June 21	7:30pm	at Richmond Raiders	W 63-28	9-2	Richmond Coliseum
14	Saturday	June 28	7:15pm	Trenton Freedom	W 64-48	10-2	Nashville Municipal Auditorium

=== Postseason ===
Round	Day	Date	Kickoff	Opponent	Results		Location
Round	Day	Date	Kickoff	Opponent	Score	Record	Location
American Conference Championship	Saturday	July 5	3:05pm	Columbus Lions	W 44-39	1-0	Nashville Municipal Auditorium
PIFL Cup III	Saturday	July 12	3:05pm	Lehigh Valley Steelhawks	W 64-43	2-0	Nashville Municipal Auditorium

== Roster ==
2014 Nashville Venom roster
Quarterbacks: 18 Zach Duckery; 12 Charles McCullum; -- A. J. McKenna; Running backs: currently vacant; Wide receivers: 10 Phillip Barnett; 4 Jordan Jolly; 5 George Murray; 2 Mack Ogletree	Offensive linemen: 99 [tanlee Bradley; 72 Anthony Jackson; 91 James Jenkins; 55 Greshom Jordan; 90 Chris Thompson; Defensive linemen: 72 Kenny Davis; 33 Brian Ellis; 7 James Frazier; 85 B. J. Taylor; 77 Walter Thomas	Linebackers: 19 Wayne Daniels; 8 Anthony Kelly; 11 Cobran'i Mixon; -- Santino Turnbow; Defensive backs: 14 Jamie Graham; 16 Will Johnson; 6 Scooter Rogers; 20 Corry Stewart; 24 Kenny Veal; 21 Kenny Walton; Kickers: 38 Christian Reed	Injured Reserve: 33 Curtis Blake LB (IR); 42 DeShawn Byrd OL (IR); 3 Ernest Ramsey DB (IR); -- Dedrick Tucker DL (IR); Exempt List: 14 Alex Carder QB (Exempt); 14 Lee Chapple QB (Exempt); -- Akeel Lendor OL (Exempt); -- Jordan Mosley OL (Exempt); Left squad: 55 Kyle McCarthy OL (Left squad); Refused to report: -- Robert Redd WR (DNR); Roster updated June 22, 2014; 28 Active, 10 Inactive → More rosters

== Division Standings ==
2014 Professional Indoor Football League
Team	Overall				Conference			
Team	W	L	T	PCT	W	L	T	PCT
National Conference
y-Trenton Freedom	8	4	0	.667	6	2	0	.750
x-Lehigh Valley Steelhawks	6	6	0	.500	5	3	0	.625
Richmond Raiders	5	7	0	.417	3	5	0	.375
Harrisburg Stampede	4	8	0	.333	2	6	0	.250
American Conference
y-Nashville Venom	10	2	0	.833	6	2	0	.750
x-Columbus Lions	7	5	0	.583	5	3	0	.625
Georgia Fire	4	8	0	.333	3	5	0	.375
Alabama Hammers	4	8	0	.333	2	6	0	.250
