= 2014 Lehigh Valley Steelhawks season =

Football season

- Owner: Glenn W. Clark
- General manager: Michael Clark
- Head coach: Chris Thompson
- Home stadium: Stabler Arena

Results
- Record: 6-6
- Conference place: 2nd
- Playoffs: Won National Conference Championship (Trenton) 49-38; Lost PIFL Cup III (Nashville) 43-64

The 2014 Lehigh Valley Steelhawks season was the fourth season as a professional indoor football franchise and their second in the Professional Indoor Football League (PIFL). One of 8 teams competing in the PIFL for the 2014 season.

The team played their home games under head coach Chris Thompson at the Stabler Arena in Bethlehem, Pennsylvania. The Steelhawks earned a 6–6 record, placing 2nd in the National Conference, winning the National Conference Championship, before losing to the Nashville Venom in PIFL Cup III.

== Schedule ==
Key: Win Tie Loss Bye

=== Regular season ===
All start times are local to home team

Week	Day	Date	Kickoff	Opponent	Results		Location
Week	Day	Date	Kickoff	Opponent	Score	Record	Location
1	BYE						
2	Sunday	April 6	4:00pm	Trenton Freedom	W 48-47	1-0	Stabler Arena
3	Friday	April 11	7:05pm	at Harrisburg Stampede	W 35-27	2-0	Giant Center
4	BYE						
5	Saturday	April 26	7:00pm	Trenton Freedom	W 42-36	3-0	Stabler Arena
6	Friday	May 3	7:00pm	Harrisburg Stampede	W 36-30	4-0	Stabler Arena
7	Sunday	May 11	4:00pm	Alabama Hammers	L 48-51	4-1	Stabler Arena
8	Saturday	May 17	7:00pm	Nashville Venom	L 38-53	4-2	Stabler Arena
9	Saturday	May 24	7:00pm	at Trenton Freedom	L 42-55	4-3	Sun National Bank Center
10	Friday	May 31	7:00pm	at Columbus Lions	L 42-54	4-4	Columbus Civic Center
11	Friday	June 6	7:05pm	at Richmond Raiders	L 37-38	4-5	Richmond Coliseum
12	Saturday	June 14	7:30pm	at Georgia Fire	W 63-57 OT	5-5	Forum Civic Center
13	Saturday	June 21	7:05pm	at Harrisburg Stampede	L 52-55	5-6	Giant Center
14	Saturday	June 28	7:00pm	Richmond Raiders	W 51-41	6-6	Stabler Arena

=== Postseason ===
All start times are local to home team

Round	Day	Date	Kickoff	Opponent	Results		Location
Round	Day	Date	Kickoff	Opponent	Score	Record	Location
National Conference Championship	Saturday	July 5	7:01pm	at Trenton Freedom	W 49-38	1-0	Sun National Bank Center
PIFL Cup III	Saturday	July 12	7:15pm	at Nashville Venom	L 64-43	1-1	Nashville Municipal Auditorium

== Roster ==
2014 Lehigh Valley Steelhawks roster
Quarterbacks: -- Andre Coles; 7 Shane McSweeny; Running backs: 40 Jeff Link; Wide receivers: 81 Matt Coston; 5 Richie Martin; 3 Troy Pascley; 1 Brandon Renford; 6 Chris Schubert	Offensive linemen: 75 Justin Bathurst; 54 Erik Pratt; 72 John Lavelle; 97 Travis Miller; 68 J. B. Walton; Defensive linemen: 92 Larry Ford; 12 Tim Hume; 92 Vince Lands; 99 Brandon Sutton; 58 Michael Woodhouse	Linebackers: -- Chindy Agugua; 8 Cory Darby; Defensive backs: 4 Stanley Dunbar; 21 Dwayne Hollis; 33 Leavander Jones; 13 Terrence Osborne; 2 Stefaun Whitehead; Kickers: 10 Michael Barnard	Injured Reserve: 81 Devron Clark WR (IR); -- Devin Duggan DB (IR); -- Justin Smith OL (IR); Exempt List: -- Rudy Cerami DL (Exempt); 6 Toriel Gibson WR (Exempt); Failure to Report - Exempt: -- Mike Jones FB (DNR); Left squad: -- Michael Atunrase DL (Left squad); 1 Scott Pillar WR (Left squad); Suspension: Current vacant; rookies in italics Roster updated June 22, 2014; 26 Active, 8 Inactive → More rosters

== Division Standings ==
2014 Professional Indoor Football League
Team	Overall				Conference			
Team	W	L	T	PCT	W	L	T	PCT
National Conference
y-Trenton Freedom	8	4	0	.667	6	2	0	.750
x-Lehigh Valley Steelhawks	6	6	0	.500	5	3	0	.625
Richmond Raiders	5	7	0	.417	3	5	0	.375
Harrisburg Stampede	4	8	0	.333	2	6	0	.250
American Conference
y-Nashville Venom	10	2	0	.833	6	2	0	.750
x-Columbus Lions	7	5	0	.583	5	3	0	.625
Georgia Fire	4	8	0	.333	3	5	0	.375
Alabama Hammers	4	8	0	.333	2	6	0	.250
