= 2014 Harrisburg Stampede season =

- Owner: Marques Colston
- Head coach: Bernie Nowotarski
- Home stadium: Giant Center

Results
- Record: 4-8
- Conference place: 4th
- Playoffs: did not qualify

The 2014 Harrisburg Stampede season was the sixth season as a professional indoor football franchise and their first in the Professional Indoor Football League. One of 8 teams competing in the PIFL for the 2014 season.

The team played their home games under head coach Bernie Nowotarski at the Giant Center, located in Hershey, Pennsylvania. The Steelhawks earned a 4-8 record, placing 4th in the National Conference, failing to qualify for the playoffs

== Schedule ==
Key: Win Tie Loss Bye

=== Regular season ===
All start times are local to home team

Week	Day	Date	Kickoff	Opponent	Results		Location
Week	Day	Date	Kickoff	Opponent	Score	Record	Location
1	Sunday	March 30	3:05pm	Columbus Lions	W 71-54	1-0	Giant Center
2	Saturday	April 5	7:00pm	at Nashville Venom	L 31-40	1-1	Nashville Municipal Auditorium
3	Friday	April 11	7:05pm	Lehigh Valley Steelhawks	L 27-35	1-2	Giant Center
4	Saturday	April 19	7:30pm	at Richmond Raiders	W 48-27	2-2	Richmond Coliseum
5	BYE						
6	Friday	May 3	7:00pm	at Lehigh Valley Steelhawks	L 30-36	2-3	Stabler Arena
7	Sunday	May 11	2:05pm	at Trenton Freedom	L 30-52	2-4	Sun National Bank Center
8	Saturday	May 17	7:00pm	Georgia Fire	W 72-64	3-4	Giant Center
9	Saturday	May 24	7:00pm	at Richmond Raiders	L 33-55	3-5	Richmond Coliseum
10	BYE						
11	Friday	June 6	7:05pm	Trenton Freedom	L 49-57	3-6	Giant Center
12	Saturday	June 14	7:30pm	Richmond Raiders	L 29-46	3-7	Giant Center
13	Saturday	June 21	7:05pm	Lehigh Valley Steelhawks	W 55-52	4-7	Giant Center
14	Friday	June 27	7:00pm	at Alabama Hammers	L 24-42	4-8	Von Braun Center

== Roster ==
2014 Harrisburg Stampede roster
Quarterbacks: 13 Steffen Colon; 19 E. J. Nemeth; Running backs: 2 Victor Sesay; Wide receivers: 11 Scorpio Brown; 21 Abe Thomas; 4 Collis Martin; 17 Daryll Shine; 1 Norm White	Offensive linemen: 75 Sarron Anderson; 72 Dominique Bacon; 99 Troy Bennett; 92 Adam Metz; 58 Jason Townson; Defensive linemen: 55 Erik Ducksworth; 3 Tim Green; 90 Daniel Orlebar; 54 Bryan Wick	Linebackers: 15 Amara Kamara; 8 Jermaine Thaxton; Defensive backs: 14 Tavius Bigelow; 6 James Pitts; 10 Travis Proctor; 5 Armar Watson; Kickers: 41 Michael Georgetti	Injured reserve: -- Jaimie Thomas OL (IR); Exempt list: -- Willie McGinnis DL (Exempt); Failure to report - exempt: -- Conredge Collins FB (DNR); -- Clem Johnson DB (DNR); -- Lowell Robinson DB (DNR); Suspension: currently vacant; Left squad: 77 Randell Bennett OL (Left squad); 72 Justin Young DL (Left squad); rookies in italics Roster updated May 15, 2014; 26 Active, 6 Inactive → More rosters

== Division Standings ==
2014 Professional Indoor Football League
Team	Overall				Conference			
Team	W	L	T	PCT	W	L	T	PCT
National Conference
y-Trenton Freedom	8	4	0	.667	6	2	0	.750
x-Lehigh Valley Steelhawks	6	6	0	.500	5	3	0	.625
Richmond Raiders	5	7	0	.417	3	5	0	.375
Harrisburg Stampede	4	8	0	.333	2	6	0	.250
American Conference
y-Nashville Venom	10	2	0	.833	6	2	0	.750
x-Columbus Lions	7	5	0	.583	5	3	0	.625
Georgia Fire	4	8	0	.333	3	5	0	.375
Alabama Hammers	4	8	0	.333	2	6	0	.250
