= 2014 Georgia Fire season =

- Owner: PIFL
- General manager: Jeff Gonos
- Head coach: Cosmo Dematteo
- Home stadium: Forum Civic Center

Results
- Record: 4–8
- Conference place: 3rd
- Playoffs: did not qualify

The 2014 Georgia Fire season was the first season as a professional indoor football franchise and their first in the Professional Indoor Football League. One of 8 teams that competed in the PIFL for the 2014 season.

With complications surrounding the Albany Panthers franchise for the 2014 season, the Professional Indoor Football League (PIFL) introduced the Fire to replace the Panthers for the 2014 season. With the league running the team, PIFL Executive Director, Jeff Ganos was named the franchise's general manager and Cosmo DeMatteo was named the team's innaurgal head coach on February 27, 2014. With the season starting on April 5, 2014, the Fire were given the Panthers roster, where players who didn't wish to play for the new franchise, refused to report. In the first game in franchise history, the Fire knocked off defending PIFL Champions, the Alabama Hammers by a score of 57–55. The Fire finished the season 4–8, failing to make the playoffs.

== Schedule ==
Key: Win Tie Loss Bye

=== Regular season ===
All start times are local to home team

Week	Day	Date	Kickoff	Opponent	Results		Location
Week	Day	Date	Kickoff	Opponent	Score	Record	Location
1	BYE						
2	Saturday	April 5	7:30pm	Alabama Hammers	W 67–65	1–0	Forum Civic Center
3	Friday	April 11	7:30pm	at Columbus Lions	L 34–71	1–1	Columbus Civic Center
4	BYE						
5	Saturday	April 26	7:00pm	at Columbus Lions	L 41–63	1–2	Columbus Civic Center
6	Saturday	May 3	7:30pm	Nashville Venom	W 49–42	2–2	Forum Civic Center
7	Saturday	May 10	7:05pm	at Nashville Venom	W 58–56	3–2	Nashville Municipal Auditorium
8	Saturday	May 17	7:05pm	at Harrisburg Stampede	L 64–72	3–3	Giant Center
9	Saturday	May 24	7:00pm	at Alabama Hammers	L 21–39	3–4	Von Braun Center
10	Sunday	June 1	1:00pm	Richmond Raiders	L 53–72	3–5	Forum Civic Center
11	Saturday	June 7	7:30pm	Nashville Venom	L 39–73	3–6	Forum Civic Center
12	Saturday	June 14	7:30pm	Lehigh Valley Steelhawks	L 57–63 OT	3–7	Forum Civic Center
13	Saturday	June 21	7:00pm	at Trenton Freedom	W 52–49	4–7	Sun National Bank Center
14	Friday	June 27	7:30pm	Columbus Lions	L 55–69	4–8	Forum Civic Center

== Roster ==
2014 Georgia Fire roster
Quarterbacks: 7 Cecil Lester; 10 Chris Mitchell; Running backs: 21 Xavier Stinson; Wide receivers: 6 Antwontis Cutts; 9 Ronald Davis; 12 Terrence Ebagua; 4 John Harris; 1 Johnny Lester	Offensive linemen: 50 Jeremy Buchanan; 59 Brandon McElroy; 72 Jason Peacock; 77 Aaron Wheeler; Defensive linemen: 94 Clinton Barley; 92 Joe Marshall; 19 Elisee Pmoplius; 15 Jerome Raymond	Linebackers: 5 Larry Edwards; 8 Adrian McLeoad; 41 Robert Russell; Defensive backs: 17 Boubacar Cissoko; 27 Robert Durham; 3 Kieron Jones; 2 Demetrie McCray; 16 Billy McGahee; Kickers: 13 Ryan Gates	Injured Reserve: 99 Ishmyl Johnson DL (IR); 75 Kevin McAlmont OL (IR); 11 Clenton Rafe WR (IR); 12 Nathan Wade WR (IR); Exempt list: currently vacant; Failure to report-exempt: -- Archie Alexander OL (DNR); -- Vauchard Goodridge DL (DNR); -- Darian Payne LB (DNR); -- James Stallons QB (DNR); -- Derrick Wimbush FB (DNR); rookies in italics Roster updated June 5, 2014; 26 Active, 9 Inactive → More rosters

== Division Standings ==
2014 Professional Indoor Football League
Team	Overall				Conference			
Team	W	L	T	PCT	W	L	T	PCT
National Conference
y-Trenton Freedom	8	4	0	.667	6	2	0	.750
x-Lehigh Valley Steelhawks	6	6	0	.500	5	3	0	.625
Richmond Raiders	5	7	0	.417	3	5	0	.375
Harrisburg Stampede	4	8	0	.333	2	6	0	.250
American Conference
y-Nashville Venom	10	2	0	.833	6	2	0	.750
x-Columbus Lions	7	5	0	.583	5	3	0	.625
Georgia Fire	4	8	0	.333	3	5	0	.375
Alabama Hammers	4	8	0	.333	2	6	0	.250
