= 2014 Richmond Raiders season =

American indoor football team season

- Owner: Mike & Elizabeth Fraizer
- Head coach: James Fuller
- Home stadium: Richmond Coliseum

Results
- Record: 5-7
- Conference place: 3rd
- Playoffs: did not qualify

The 2014 Richmond Raiders season was the fifth season as a professional indoor football franchise and their third in the Professional Indoor Football League (PIFL). One of 8 teams competing in the PIFL for the 2014 season.

The team was led by head coach James Fuller.

== Schedule ==
Key: Win Tie Loss Bye

=== Regular season ===
All start times are local to home team

| Week | Day | Date | Kickoff | Opponent | Results | | Location | Attendance |
| Week | Day | Date | Kickoff | Opponent | Score | Record | Location | Attendance |
|---|---|---|---|---|---|---|---|---|
| 1 | Sunday | March 30 | 2:05pm | at Trenton Freedom | L 17-52 | 0-1 | Sun National Bank Center | 1,544 |
| 2 | Saturday | April 5 | 7:30pm | at Columbus Lions | L 21-42 | 0-2 | Columbus Civic Center | 2,786 |
| 3 | Saturday | April 12 | 7:30pm | Alabama Hammers | W 38-35 | 1-2 | Richmond Coliseum | 4,019 |
| 4 | Saturday | April 19 | 7:30pm | Harrisburg Stampede | L 47-48 | 1-3 | Richmond Coliseum | 3,351 |
| 5 | BYE | | | | | | | |
| 6 | Friday | May 3 | 7:05pm | at Trenton Freedom | L 32-33 | 1-4 | Sun National Bank Center | |
| 7 | BYE | | | | | | | |
| 8 | Saturday | May 17 | 7:05pm | Trenton Freedom | L 42-52 | 1-5 | Richmond Coliseum | 3,242 |
| 9 | Saturday | May 24 | 7:05pm | Harrisburg Stampede | W 55-33 | 2-5 | Richmond Coliseum | 2,926 |
| 10 | Sunday | June 1 | 1:00pm | at Georgia Fire | W 72-53 | 3-5 | Forum Civic Center | 250 |
| 11 | Friday | June 6 | 7:05pm | Lehigh Valley Steelhawks | W 38-37 | 4-5 | Richmond Coliseum | |
| 12 | Saturday | June 14 | 4:05pm | at Harrisburg Stampede | W 46-29 | 5-5 | Giant Center | |
| 13 | Saturday | June 21 | 7:30pm | Nashville Venom | L 28-63 | 5-6 | Richmond Coliseum | 3,758 |
| 14 | Saturday | June 28 | 7:00pm | at Lehigh Valley Steelhawks | L 41-51 | 5-7 | Stabler Arena | |

== Roster ==
2014 Richmond Raiders roster
| Quarterbacks: 3 Jonathan Bane; 17 Phil Konopka; Running backs: 32 Kenny Jones; Wide receivers: 12 Gerron Bryant; 2 Daron Clark; 19 Derrick Hector; 5 Herb Jones; 1 Antwun Williams | Offensive linemen: 76 Stedman Gardner; -- Joseph Johnson; 78 Kynneth Moses; 52 Roman Pritt; 65 Eric Weaver; Defensive linemen: 77 James Carter; 94 Devin Jones; 90 Christian Lacey | Linebackers: 41 Raibonne Charles; 56 Preston Hines; 11 Gustavus Tyson; Defensive backs: 21 Kevin Allen; 22 Tyrell Austin; 4 Ke'Mon Bailey; 6 Malik Cromartie; 8 Torez Jones; Kickers: 18 T. C. Stevens | Injured reserve: -- Brian Frierson; 3 Hakeem Moore WR (IR); 31 Maurice Thorne DB (IR); Exempt list: -- Rory Nixon OL (Exempt); Suspended: currently vacant; rookies in italics Roster updated May 30, 2014; 25 Active, 4 Inactive → More rosters |

== Division standings ==
2014 Professional Indoor Football League
| Team | Overall | | | | Conference | | | |
| Team | W | L | T | PCT | W | L | T | PCT |
|---|---|---|---|---|---|---|---|---|
National Conference
| y-Trenton Freedom | 8 | 4 | 0 | .667 | 6 | 2 | 0 | .750 |
| x-Lehigh Valley Steelhawks | 6 | 6 | 0 | .500 | 5 | 3 | 0 | .625 |
| Richmond Raiders | 5 | 7 | 0 | .417 | 3 | 5 | 0 | .375 |
| Harrisburg Stampede | 4 | 8 | 0 | .333 | 2 | 6 | 0 | .250 |
American Conference
| y-Nashville Venom | 10 | 2 | 0 | .833 | 6 | 2 | 0 | .750 |
| x-Columbus Lions | 7 | 5 | 0 | .583 | 5 | 3 | 0 | .625 |
| Georgia Fire | 4 | 8 | 0 | .333 | 3 | 5 | 0 | .375 |
| Alabama Hammers | 4 | 8 | 0 | .333 | 2 | 6 | 0 | .250 |
