= Keith Newell (American football) =

American football player (born 1988)

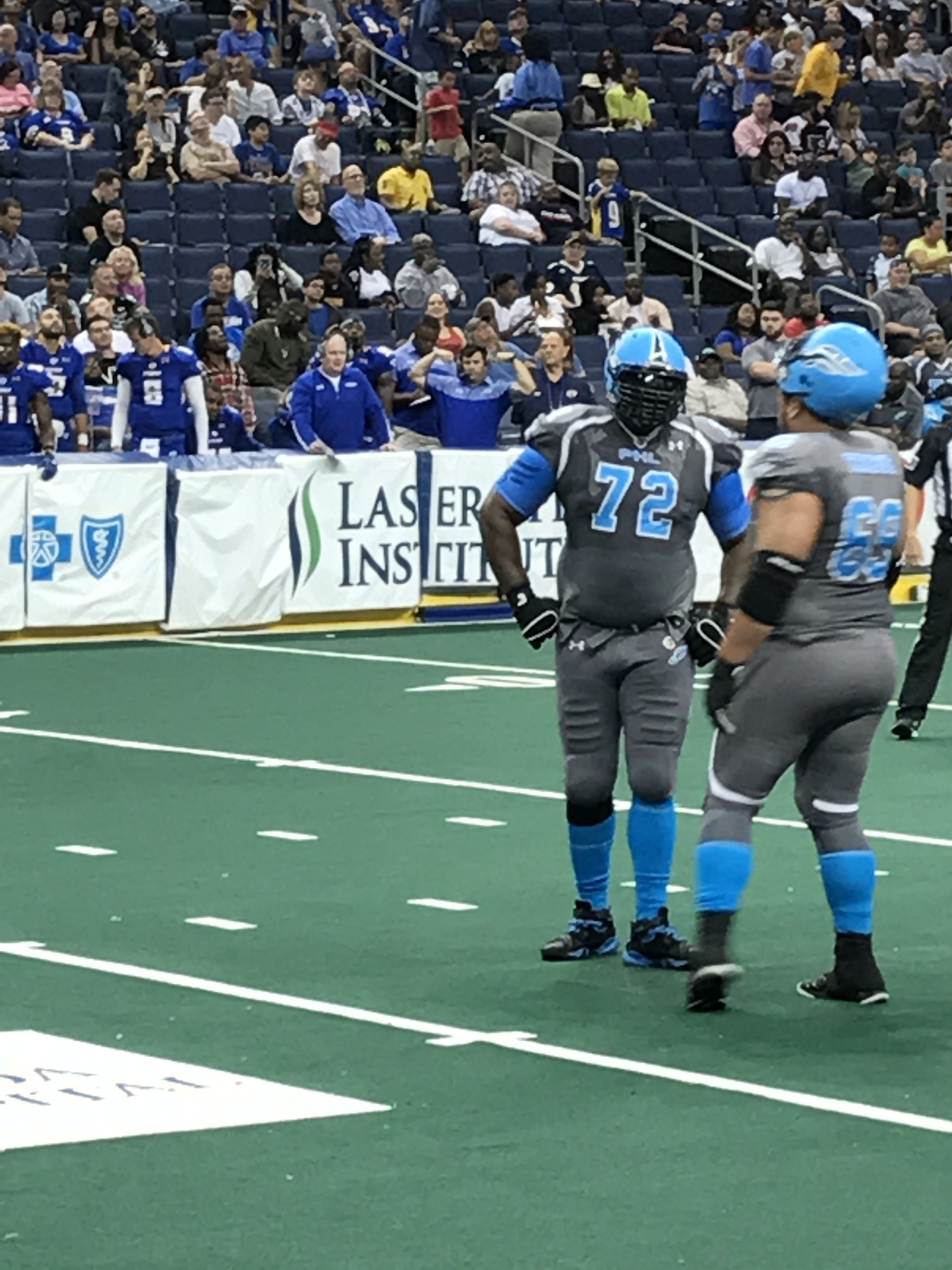
- Newell (72) with the Philadelphia Soul in 2017

No. 72
- Position: Offensive lineman

Personal information
- Born: January 10, 1988 (age 38); Trenton, New Jersey, U.S.
- Listed height: 6 ft 6 in (1.98 m)
- Listed weight: 310 lb (141 kg)

Career information
- High school: Trenton (NJ) Central
- College: Delaware State
- NFL draft: 2012: undrafted

Career history
- Trenton Freedom (2014–2015); Pittsburgh Power (2014); Philadelphia Soul (2015–2019); FXFL Blacktips (2015)

Awards and highlights
- 2× ArenaBowl champion (2016, 2017)

Career AFL statistics
- Receptions: 4
- Receiving yards: 18
- Touchdowns: 2
- Stats at ArenaFan.com

Keith Newell (born January 10, 1988) is an American former professional football offensive lineman. He played college football at Delaware State University.

== College career ==
Newell played for the Rutgers Scarlet Knights from 2007 to 2008. He never appeared in a game for the Scarlet Knights. In 2009, he transferred to Delaware State where he would play from 2009 to 2011. He was the team's starter his final two years and helped the Hornets to 6 wins. He played in 21 games during his career including 21 starts at tackle.

== Professional career ==
Pre-draft measurables
Height	Weight	40-yard dash	10-yard split	20-yard split	20-yard shuttle	Three-cone drill	Vertical jump	Broad jump	Bench press
6 ft 6 in (1.98 m)	308 lb (140 kg)	5.64 s	1.90 s	3.21 s	5.39 s	8.21 s	27.5 in (0.70 m)	8 ft 11 in (2.72 m)	15 reps
All values from Rutgers Pro Day

Newell signed with the Trenton Freedom of the Professional Indoor Football League. Newell was placed on the exempt list before the season began.

On March 7, 2014, Newell was assigned to the Pittsburgh Power of the Arena Football League (AFL). Newell played in 14 games, starting 10 as the Power finished a franchise best 15–3. Newell had his rookie option picked up on September 24, 2014.

On December 29, 2014, Newell was assigned to the AFL's Philadelphia Soul. Newell helped the Soul reach and win ArenaBowl XXIX. On August 26, 2017, the Soul beat the Tampa Bay Storm in ArenaBowl XXX by a score of 44–40.

Newell played with the FXFL Blacktips of the Fall Experimental Football League during their 2015 season.

Newell signed with the Jersey Flight of the National Arena League for the 2020 season but the season was later cancelled due to the COVID-19 pandemic. In September 2020, he re-signed with the Flight.
