= 2014 Alabama Hammers season =

- Head coach: Dean Cokinos
- Home stadium: Von Braun Center

Results
- Record: 4–8
- Conference place: 4th
- Playoffs: Did not qualify

The 2014 Alabama Hammers season was the fourth season for the professional indoor football franchise and their third in the Professional Indoor Football League (PIFL). The Hammers were one of eight teams that competed in the PIFL for the 2014 season.

The team played their home games under head coach Dean Cokinos at the Von Braun Center in Huntsville, Alabama. The Hammers earned a 4–8 record, placing fourth in the American Conference, failing to qualify for the playoffs

== Schedule ==
Key: Win Tie Loss Bye

=== Regular season ===
All start times are local to home team

Week	Day	Date	Kickoff	Opponent	Results		Location
Week	Day	Date	Kickoff	Opponent	Score	Record	Location
1	Saturday	March 29	7:00pm	Nashville Venom	L 40–57	0–1	Von Braun Center
2	Saturday	April 5	7:30pm	at Georgia Fire	L 65–67	0–2	Forum Civic Center
3	Saturday	April 12	7:30pm	at Richmond Raiders	L 35–38	0–3	Richmond Coliseum
4	Friday	April 18	7:35pm	at Nashville Venom	L 29–59	0–4	Nashville Municipal Auditorium
5	BYE						
6	BYE						
7	Sunday	May 11	7:00pm	at Lehigh Valley Steelhawks	W 51–48	1–4	Stabler Arena
8	Saturday	May 17	7:00pm	Columbus Lions	W 73–53	2–4	Von Braun Center
9	Saturday	May 24	7:00pm	Georgia Fire	W 39–21	3–4	Von Braun Center
10	Monday	June 2	7:15pm	at Nashville Venom	L 45–59	3–5	Nashville Municipal Auditorium
11	Saturday	June 7	7:00pm	at Columbus Lions	L 31–39	3–6	Columbus Civic Center
12	Saturday	June 14	7:00pm	Trenton Freedom	L 47–49	3–7	Von Braun Center
13	Saturday	June 21	7:30pm	Columbus Lions	L 31–69	3–8	Von Braun Center
14	Friday	June 27	7:30pm	Harrisburg Stampede	W 42–24	4–8	Von Braun Center

== Roster ==
2014 Alabama Hammers roster
Quarterbacks: 12 Russell Hill; 9 Kevin Huff; 7 John Thomason; Running backs: 42 Johnny Anderson; Wide receivers: -- Rob Brown; 10 Jeremy Grier; 8 C. J. Johnson; 3 Charles McClain; 4 Mico McSwain; 5 Larry Shipp	Offensive linemen: 54 Danny Liddell; 70 Ray Norell; 72 Darius Turner; -- Terrael Williams; Defensive linemen: 11 Darian Barnes; 19 Caleb Bostic; 90 Andre Mathis; 44 Benji McDowell; 90 Tim Tillman; 92 Jeremiah Zene; 62 Derrick Ziegler	Linebackers: 33 Brandon Sharpe; Defensive backs: 1 Svante Davenport; 6 Vince Hill; 2 Ginikachi Ibe; 18 T. J. Williams; Kickers: 22 Armando Cuko	Injured reserve: 42 Lance Ancar FB (IR); 7 Travis Blanchard DB (IR); 9 Darnell Kennedy QB (IR); Exempt list: -- Kelvin Bolden WR (Exempt); 62 Chuck Curry OL (Exempt); 5 Maurice Dupree WR (Exempt); -- Mike Simmons OL (Exempt); -- Carnell Stewart OL (Exempt); Suspension: 12 Josh McGregor QB (Susp.); Failure to report-exempt: -- Kevin Eakin QB (DNR); 53 Bruce McCaleb OL (DNR); -- Michael Smith DL (DNR); Left squad: 18 Byron Best DB (Left squad); 33 Benjamin Miller LB (Left squad); Roster updated June 10, 2014; 27 Active, 13 Inactive → More rosters

== Division standings ==
2014 Professional Indoor Football League
Team	Overall				Conference			
Team	W	L	T	PCT	W	L	T	PCT
National Conference
y-Trenton Freedom	8	4	0	.667	6	2	0	.750
x-Lehigh Valley Steelhawks	6	6	0	.500	5	3	0	.625
Richmond Raiders	5	7	0	.417	3	5	0	.375
Harrisburg Stampede	4	8	0	.333	2	6	0	.250
American Conference
y-Nashville Venom	10	2	0	.833	6	2	0	.750
x-Columbus Lions	7	5	0	.583	5	3	0	.625
Georgia Fire	4	8	0	.333	3	5	0	.375
Alabama Hammers	4	8	0	.333	2	6	0	.250
