= Jeremy Schonbrunner =

American football player (born 1989)

No. 75, 61, 71
- Position: Offensive lineman

Personal information
- Born: September 12, 1989 (age 37); Salisbury, Maryland, U.S.
- Listed height: 6 ft 4 in (1.93 m)
- Listed weight: 320 lb (145 kg)

Career information
- High school: Salisbury (MD) Wicomico
- College: Temple
- NFL draft: 2012: undrafted

Career history
- Philadelphia Soul (2012)*; Lehigh Valley Steelhawks (2012–2013); San Antonio Talons (2013)*; Trenton Freedom (2014)*; Iowa Barnstormers (2014); San Antonio Talons (2014); Trenton Freedom (2015)*; Tampa Bay Storm (2015–2016); Iowa Barnstormers (2017); Columbus Lions (2018)
- * Offseason or practice squad member only

Career AFL statistics
- Total tackles: 1
- Stats at ArenaFan.com

Jeremy Schonbrunner (born September 12, 1989) is an American former professional football offensive lineman. He played college football at Temple University and attended Wicomico High School in Salisbury, Maryland. He was a member of the Philadelphia Soul, Lehigh Valley Steelhawks, San Antonio Talons, Trenton Freedom, Iowa Barnstormers, Tampa Bay Storm, and Columbus Lions.

== College career ==
Schonbrunner played for the Temple Owls from 2007 to 2011. He was the team's starter his final year and helped the Owls to 9 wins. He played in 30 games during his career including 9 starts at center.

== Professional career ==
On February 8, 2012, Schonbrunner was assigned to the Philadelphia Soul of the Arena Football League. He was placed on reassignment on March 1, 2012.

On April 2, 2012, Schonbrunner signed with the Lehigh Valley Steelhawks of the Indoor Football League. On June 19, 2012, Schonbrunner was assigned to the Georgia Force, but his assignment was voided on June 21, 2012. On November 12, 2012, Schonbrunner re-signed with the Steelhawks for the 2013 season. On June 16, 2013, Schonbrunner was placed on the exempt list.

On February 15, 2013, Schonbrunner was assigned to the San Antonio Talons. On March 16, 2013, he was placed on injured reserve. On May 17, 2013, he was placed on reassignment. Schonbrunner never appeared in a game for the Talons before returning to the Steelhawks

Schonbrunner was signed by the Trenton Freedom for the 2014 season, but Schonbrunner was assigned to the Iowa Barnstormers and left the Freedom before playing in a single game.

On February 5, 2014, Schonbrunner was assigned to the Iowa Barnstormers.

On May 13, 2014, Schonbrunner was traded to the Talons for claim order position.

Schonbrunner signed with the Freedom again for the 2015 season, but was placed on the exempt list before the season started.

On October 14, 2014, Schonbrunner was assigned to the Tampa Bay Storm. On March 9, 2016, Schonbrunner was placed on suspension by the Storm. On April 25, 2016, Schonbrunner was placed on reassignment.

On October 21, 2016, Schonbrunner signed with the Barnstormers.

On November 7, 2017, Schonbrunner signed with the Columbus Lions.
