= Lee Chapple =

American football player (born 1989)

No. 14, 8
- Position: Quarterback

Personal information
- Born: June 25, 1989 (age 37); Alpharetta, Georgia, U.S.
- Listed height: 6 ft 1 in (1.85 m)
- Listed weight: 215 lb (98 kg)

Career information
- High school: Norcross (GA) Greater Atlanta Christian
- College: North Alabama; Georgia Southern
- NFL draft: 2012: undrafted

Career history
- Colorado Ice (2013)*; Nebraska Danger (2013); Columbus Lions (2013); Jacksonville Sharks (2013); Omaha Beef (2014); Nashville Venom (2014); Jacksonville Sharks (2014–2015); Atlanta Havoc (2018)
- * Offseason or practice squad member only

Career AFL statistics
- Comp. / Att.: 18 / 28
- Passing yards: 212
- TD–INT: 2–1
- QB rating: 90.18
- Rushing TD: 0
- Stats at ArenaFan.com

Robert Lee Chapple (born June 25, 1989) is an American former football quarterback. He signed with the Colorado Ice as an undrafted free agent in 2012. He played college football at the University of North Alabama after transferring out of Georgia Southern University.

== Professional career ==
After failing to make the Colorado Ice following their mini-camp, Chapple was signed by the Nebraska Danger of the Indoor Football League (IFL). Chapple played a few games with the Danger, before signing with the Columbus Lions of the Professional Indoor Football League (PIFL). After a few games with the Lions, Chapple was assigned to the Jacksonville Sharks of the Arena Football League (AFL).

Chapple returned to indoor football in 2014, signing with the Omaha Beef of the Champions Professional Indoor Football League (CPIFL). Shortly after the season started, Chapple signed with the Nashville Venom (of the PIFL) due to their flurry of injuries and quarterbacks signing with other leagues. Chapple himself would join that list, once again being assigned to the Sharks, where he finished out the 2014 season backing up R. J. Archer.

Chapple returned to the Sharks for the start of the 2015 season and was the backup to Tommy Grady.

Chapple signed with the Atlanta Havoc for the 2018 season.

=== AFL statistics ===
Year	Team	Passing							Rushing		
Year	Team	Cmp	Att	Pct	Yds	TD	Int	Rtg	Att	Yds	TD
2014	Jacksonville	5	10	50.0	35	0	0	58.33	2	4	0
2015	Jacksonville	13	18	72.2	177	2	1	107.87	9	23	0
Career		18	28	64.3	212	2	1	90.18	11	27	0
