= Kenny Veal =

American football player (born 1989)

No. 24, 9, 20
- Position: Defensive back

Personal information
- Born: May 26, 1989 (age 37); Hamilton, Ohio, U.S.
- Listed height: 6 ft 0 in (1.83 m)
- Listed weight: 195 lb (88 kg)

Career information
- High school: Hamilton
- College: Thomas More College (KY)
- NFL draft: 2013: undrafted

Career history
- Nashville Venom (2014–2015); Cleveland Gladiators (2015–2016)*; Wichita Falls Nighthawks (2016–2017); Cleveland Gladiators (2017); Green Bay Blizzard (2017); Jacksonville Sharks (2018); Columbus Destroyers (2019)*; Carolina Cobras (2021); Jacksonville Sharks (2021–2022); Albany Empire (2022); Carolina Cobras (2023)
- * Offseason or practice squad member only

Awards and highlights
- PIFL Cup Champion (2014); First-team All-PIFL (2015)

Career AFL statistics
- Tackles: 26.5
- Pass breakups: 3
- Interceptions: 3
- Kick returns: 26
- Kick return yards: 462
- Stats at ArenaFan.com

Kenny Leon Veal, Jr. (born May 26, 1989) is an American former football defensive back. He played college football at Thomas More College. He was a member of the Nashville Venom, Cleveland Gladiators, Wichita Falls Nighthawks, Green Bay Blizzard, Jacksonville Sharks, Columbus Destroyers, Carolina Cobras, and Albany Empire.

== Early life ==
Veal attended Hamilton High School. He was selected to play in the Big 33 Football Classic.

== College career ==
Veal played for the Toledo Rockets from 2008 to 2009 and helped the Rockets to 8 wins. Veal played in 22 games with the Rockets and started 5 at cornerback. In 2010, Veal transferred to Grand Valley State where he redshirted as a junior. As a redshirt junior, Veal played in 11 games and started 7 at cornerback. In 2012, Veal transferred to Thomas More College where he started for the Saints as a senior.

=== Statistics ===
Year	Team	Tackles						Interceptions					Kickoff Returns				
Year	Team	Solo	Ast	Total	Loss	Sacks	FF	Int	Yards	Avg	TD	PD	Att	Yards	Avg	TD	Long
2008	Toledo	18	6	24	0.0	0.0	0	1	0	0.0	0	3	9	155	17.2	0	28
2009	Toledo	10	5	15	0.0	0.0	0	1	0	0.0	0	3	8	195	24.4	0	35
2011	Grand Valley State	24	16	40	1.5	0.0	0	2	1	0.5	0	8	0	0	--	0	--
2012	Thomas More	31	9	40	3.0	0.0	2	2	33	16.5	0	14	7	125	17.9	0	21
Career		83	36	119	4.5	0.0	2	6	34	5.7	0	28	24	475	19.8	0	35

== Professional career ==
Veal signed with the Nashville Venom of the Professional Indoor Football League (PIFL) in 2014. Veal helped guide the Venom to a victory in PIFL Cup III. Veal returned to the Venom in 2015. Veal was named an All-PIFL selection in 2015.

Veal was assigned to the Cleveland Gladiators of the Arena Football League (AFL) on July 30, 2015, but never appeared in a game for the Gladiators. On August 16, 2015, Veal was placed on inactive reserve. On May 13, 2016, Veal was placed on reassignment.

On May 19, 2016, Veal signed with the Wichita Falls Nighthawks of the Indoor Football League (IFL).

On April 14, 2017, Veal was assigned to the Gladiators. On April 19, 2017, Veal was placed on reassignment. On June 9, 2017, Veal re-joined the Gladiators.

On May 4, 2017, Veal signed with the Green Bay Blizzard of the IFL.

Veal signed with the Jacksonville Sharks of the National Arena League (NAL) in December 2017.

On March 7, 2019, Veal was assigned to the Columbus Destroyers of the AFL. On April 13, 2019, he was placed on recallable reassignment and became a free agent.

On May 5, 2021, Veal signed with the Carolina Cobras of the NAL. On June 10, 2021, Veal was released by the Cobras.

On June 24, 2021, Veal signed with the Sharks for his second stint with the team. On March 3, 2022, Veal re-signed with the Sharks for the 2022 season.

On May 24, 2022, Veal was traded to the Albany Empire of the NAL.

On January 9, 2023, Veal signed with the Cobras for his second stint with the team. Veal became a free agent at the end of the season.
