= Amara Kamara =

Liberian gridiron football player (born 1988)

Profile
- Position: Linebacker / Defensive end

Personal information
- Born: 2 February 1988 (age 38); Monrovia, Liberia
- Listed height: 6 ft 0 in (1.83 m)
- Listed weight: 238 lb (108 kg)

Career information
- High school: Newark (NJ) Weequahic
- College: Temple
- NFL draft: 2011: undrafted

Career history
- Kansas City Chiefs (2011)*; BC Lions (2011); San Diego Chargers (2012)*; Lincoln Haymakers (2013); Harrisburg Stampede (2014); Lehigh Valley Steelhawks (2015–2016)
- * Offseason or practice squad member only

Awards and highlights
- First-team All-PIFL (2014); Second-team All-PIFL (2015)

Career CFL statistics
- Tackles: 2
- Stats at Pro Football Reference

Amara Kamara (born 2 February 1988) is a Liberian former gridiron football linebacker. After his family immigrated to the United States, he attended local schools in Newark, New Jersey, where he started playing American football. In 2006, he was named by The Star-Ledger as the State Defensive Player of the Year.

== Early life and education ==
Amara Kamara was born in Liberia in 1988. He immigrated to the United States with his family, and they settled in Newark, New Jersey. He attended local schools and was known from his early years for his athletic ability.

While attending Newark Tech High School, Kamara competed athletically playing football at Weequahic High School also in Newark. He was named as second-team All-American, and in 2006 he made 193 total tackles and seven forced fumbles. That year, he was named by The Star-Ledger as the State Defensive Player of the Year. He graduated from Newark Tech High School in 2007.

== College career ==
Kamara attended Temple University in Philadelphia, Pennsylvania. In his first year as an Owl on their football team, he was the only freshman to start every game. He recorded 71 total tackles in his first year. Going into his sophomore season as an Owl, Kamara was named the starter at the Linebacker position. He graduated in 2011.

== Professional career ==
Pre-draft measurables
Height	Weight	40-yard dash	10-yard split	20-yard split	20-yard shuttle	Three-cone drill	Vertical jump	Broad jump	Bench press
6 ft 0 3/8 in (1.84 m)	238 lb (108 kg)	4.72 s	1.61 s	2.65 s	4.50 s	7.23 s	32.0 in (0.81 m)	9 ft 8 in (2.95 m)	25 reps
All values from Pro Day

Kamara entered the 2011 NFL draft but was not drafted.

=== BC Lions ===
On 27 September 2011, Kamara was signed by the BC Lions of British Columbia, Canada. They are based in Vancouver, British Columbia.

=== Harrisburg Stampede ===
On 20 December 2013, Kamara signed with the Harrisburg Stampede of the Professional Indoor Football League, based in Hershey, Pennsylvania.

=== Lehigh Valley Steelhawks ===
On 18 February 2015, Kamara signed with the Lehigh Valley Steelhawks, also of the PIFL. He earned Second-team All-PIFL as a defensive lineman following the season. On 12 May 2016, Kamara signed with the Steelhawks during the 2016 season.
