= Melik Brown =

American gridiron football player (born 1984)

No. 6
- Position: Fullback

Personal information
- Born: September 14, 1984 (age 42); Camden, New Jersey, U.S.
- Listed height: 6 ft 2 in (1.88 m)
- Listed weight: 280 lb (127 kg)

Career information
- High school: Chatham (VA) Hargrave Military Academy
- College: North Carolina
- NFL draft: 2007: undrafted

Career history
- South Jersey Lynx (2007); Central Penn Piranha (2008); Harrisburg Stampede (2009); BC Lions (2009)*; Baltimore Mariners (2010); Trenton Steel (2011); Philadelphia Soul (2011–2013); Trenton Freedom (2014–2015)
- * Offseason or practice squad member only

Awards and highlights
- AIFA champion (2010); 3× First Team All-PIFL (FB & Iron-man) (2014, 2015)

Career AFL statistics
- Tackles: 24
- Sacks: 2
- Rushes: 13
- Rush yards: 54
- Rush TDs: 4
- Stats at ArenaFan.com

Melik Brown (born September 14, 1984) is an American former professional football fullback.

== College career ==
Brown was a four-year starter at the University of North Carolina, where he played linebacker and defensive end. He set the defensive lineman squat record of 655 lbs.

== Professional career ==
He was signed by the South Jersey Lynx as a street free agent in 2007. Brown has also played for the Central Penn Piranha and the BC Lions. In 2009, Brown started playing indoor football, when he joined the Harrisburg Stampede of the American Indoor Football Association (AIFA). The Stampede struggled that season, leading Brown to sign with the Baltimore Mariners the following season. On February 11, 2011, Brown signed with the Philadelphia Soul of the Arena Football League (AFL). He was released two months later. He signed with the Southern Indoor Football League's Trenton Steel on April 26, 2011. Brown spent the next two years on and off with the Soul. On January 6, 2014, Brown signed with the Trenton Freedom of the Professional Indoor Football League (PIFL). In 2015, Brown was twice named to the First Team All-PIFL as both a fullback and Iron-man.
