= Tyrell Zimmerman =

American football player (born 1985)

No. 56
- Position: Defensive linemen

Personal information
- Born: February 23, 1985 (age 41)
- Listed height: 6 ft 1 in (1.85 m)
- Listed weight: 290 lb (132 kg)

Career information
- High school: Waterbury (CT) Wilby
- College: Pace
- NFL draft: 2010: undrafted

Career history
- Billings Outlaws (2010); Trenton Steel (2011); Tulsa Talons (2011); Columbus Lions (2014)

Awards and highlights
- United Bowl champion (2010)

Career AFL statistics
- Tackles: 1
- Sacks: 1
- Stats at ArenaFan.com

Tyrell Zimmerman (Born February 23, 1985) is an American former professional football player. Zimmerman attended Pace University. In 2010, he was a member of the Billings Outlaws of the Indoor Football League. In 2011, he played for the Trenton Steel of the Southern Indoor Football League. At the conclusion of the Steel's season Zimmerman was signed by the Tulsa Talons of the Arena Football League.
