= Rodney Gnat =

American football player (born 1987)

No. 19, 23, 95
- Position: Defensive lineman

Personal information
- Born: March 16, 1987 (age 39)
- Listed height: 6 ft 3 in (1.91 m)
- Listed weight: 253 lb (115 kg)

Career information
- High school: Wolfson (Jacksonville, Florida)
- College: Louisville
- NFL draft: 2011: undrafted

Career history
- Iowa Barnstormers (2012–2013); Sioux Falls Storm (2014); Omaha Beef (2014); Green Bay Blizzard (2014); Columbus Lions (2014); Iowa Barnstormers (2014); Colorado Crush (2016); Wichita Falls Nighthawks (2016); Jacksonville Sharks (2017)*
- * Offseason or practice squad member only

Career AFL statistics
- Total tackles: 31
- Sacks: 21.5
- Forced fumbles: 2
- Stats at ArenaFan.com

Rodney Gnat (born March 16, 1987) is a former arena football defensive end. Gnat played collegiately at Louisville. He is currently the head football coach at Wolfson High School (Jacksonville, FL).

== Professional career ==
=== Iowa Barnstomers ===
After not hearing his name called at the 2011 NFL draft, Gnat signed with the Iowa Barnstormers of the Arena Football League. Gnat returned to the Barnstormers for the 2013 season.

=== Sioux Fall Storm ===
In March 2014, Gnat signed with the Sioux Falls Storm of the Indoor Football League (IFL). He was released on March 27, 2014.

=== Omaha Beef ===
On April 28, 2014, Gnat was released by the Omaha Beef of the Champions Professional Indoor Football League (CPIFL).

=== Green Bay Blizzard ===
On April 30, 2014, Gnat signed with the Green Bay Blizzard.

=== Columbus Lions ===
On May 27, 2014, Gnat signed with the Columbus Lions of the Professional Indoor Football League (PIFL).

=== Colorado Crush ===
Gnat was released on March 10, 2016.

=== Wichita Falls Nighthawks ===
On March 14, 2016, Gnat signed with the Wichita Falls Nighthawks. On June 28, 2016, Gnat was released.

=== Jacksonville Sharks ===
On January 19, 2017, Gnat signed with the Jacksonville Sharks.
