= Wayne Daniels =

American football player (born 1987)

No. 19
- Position: Defensive end

Personal information
- Born: April 18, 1987 (age 39); Kilgore, Texas, U.S.
- Listed height: 6 ft 2 in (1.88 m)
- Listed weight: 250 lb (113 kg)

Career information
- High school: Kilgore
- College: TCU
- NFL draft: 2011: undrafted

Career history
- New York Jets (2011)*; Chicago Rush (2012); Pittsburgh Power (2012)*; Chicago Rush (2012); Texas Revolution (2013); Nashville Venom (2014); Wichita Falls Nighthawks (2016)*
- * Offseason or practice squad member only

Awards and highlights
- PIFL champion (2014); Second-team All-PIFL (2014); First-team All-American (2010); First-team All-MW (2010); Second-team All-MW (2009)

Career AFL statistics
- Tackles: 2
- Fumble recoveries: 1
- Stats at ArenaFan.com

Wayne Daniels (born April 8, 1987) is an American former professional football player who was a defensive end. He played college football for the TCU Horned Frogs. Daniels was a 2010 College All-American selection by the Football Writers Association of America.

== Early life ==
Daniels attended Kilgore High School in Texas, where he registered 65 tackles with eight sacks, three quarterback pressures and an interception in his senior year. Regarded as a three-star recruit by Rivals.com, Daniels was listed as the No. 32 strongside defensive end prospect in the class of 2006.

== Professional career ==
=== New York Jets ===
After going undrafted, Daniels signed as an undrafted free agent with the New York Jets.

=== Chicago Rush ===
Daniels was assigned to the Chicago Rush of the Arena Football League (AFL). On December 6, 2011, he was traded to the Pittsburgh Power, but later placed him on reassignment on March 20, 2012. He was once again assigned to the Rush in March.

=== Texas Revolution ===
In December 2012, Daniels signed with the Texas Revolution, an indoor football team in the Indoor Football League.

=== Nashville Venom ===
On November 7, 2013, Daniels followed former Revolution Head Coach, Billy Back, to the expansion Nashville Venom of the Professional Indoor Football League. He was waived on March 25, 2015.
