= Roger Jackson (wide receiver) =

American football player (born 1989)

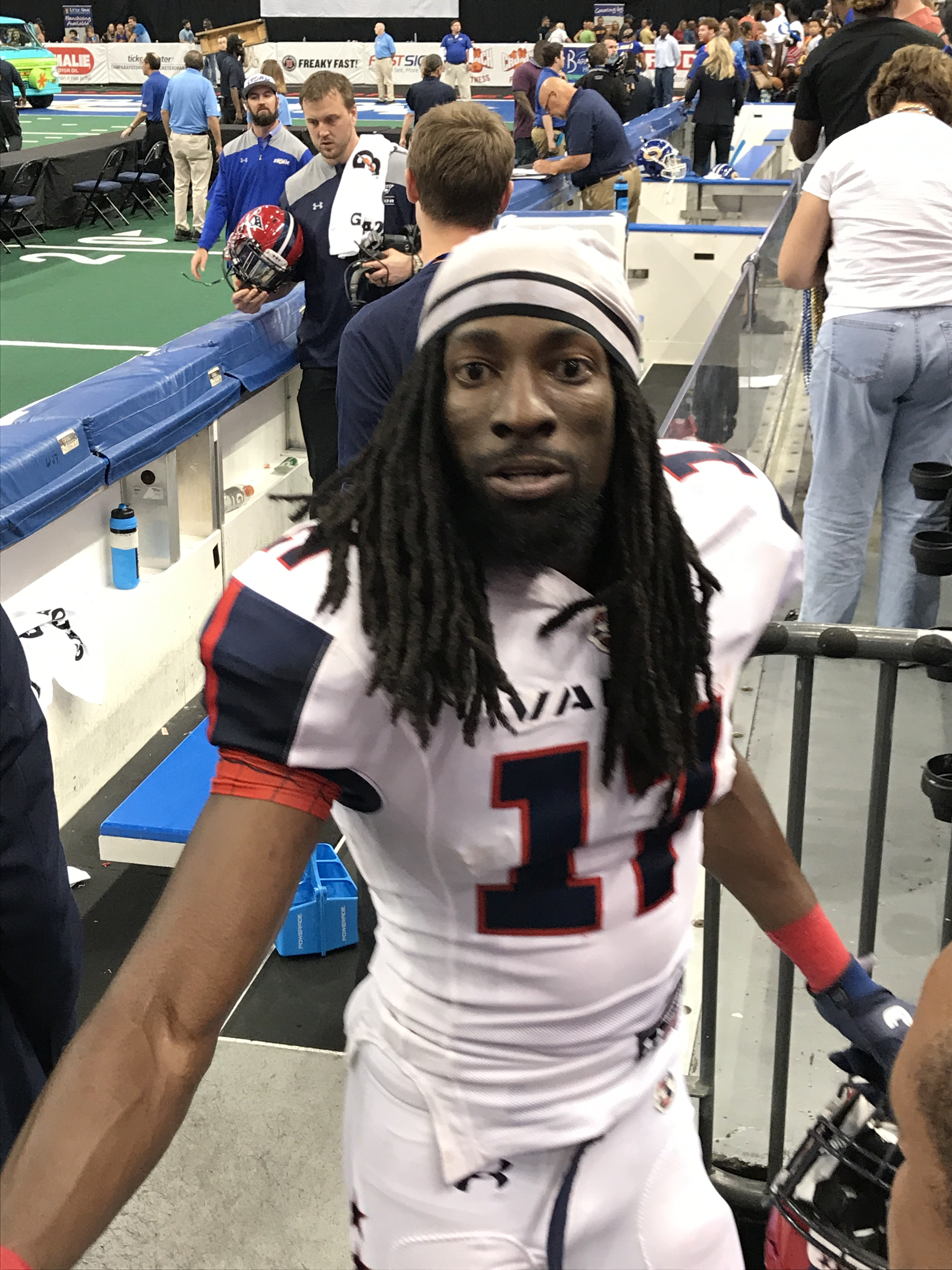
- Jackson with the Washington Valor in 2017

No. 9, 19, 17
- Position: Wide receiver

Personal information
- Born: August 19, 1989 (age 37); New Orleans, Louisiana
- Listed height: 6 ft 3 in (1.91 m)
- Listed weight: 190 lb (86 kg)

Career information
- High school: Siloam Springs (AR)
- College: Arkansas Tech
- NFL draft: 2014: undrafted

Career history
- Iowa Barnstormers (2014)*; Trenton Freedom (2014–2015); New Orleans VooDoo (2015); Jacksonville Sharks (2016); Washington Valor (2017)
- * Offseason or practice squad member only

Awards and highlights
- PIFL Offensive Rookie of the Year (2014)

Career AFL statistics
- Receptions: 188
- Receiving yards: 2,043
- Receiving TDs: 31
- Tackles: 37
- Stats at ArenaFan.com

Roger Jackson (born August 19, 1989) is an American former professional football wide receiver. He played college football at Arkansas Tech University.

== Early life ==
Jackson attended L.W. Higgins High School, in Jefferson Parish, Louisiana, until his sophomore year, when Hurricane Katrina struck, forcing him out of his home. He and his family relocated to Siloam Springs, Arkansas, where he attended Siloam Springs High School. While at Silom Springs, Jackson played both football and basketball, where he helped the Panthers win the 5A state championship in 2008.

== College career ==
Jackson signed to play college football at Arkansas Tech University. As a senior in 2013, Jackson had 23 receptions for 239 yards and 3 touchdowns.

== Professional career ==
=== Iowa Barnstormers ===
On February 20, 2014, Jackson was assigned to the Iowa Barnstormers of the Arena Football League, he participated in camp with the Barnstormers, but was reassigned prior to the beginning of the season.

=== Trenton Freedom ===
Two days after his release from the Barnstormers, Trenton Freedom offensive coordinator, Ryan Vena, called Jackson and signed him. Jackson's play earned him the Professional Indoor Football League's Offensive Rookie of the Year.

=== New Orleans VooDoo ===
After starting the 2015 season with the Freedom, Jackson was assigned to the New Orleans VooDoo on April 30, 2015. Jackson would play only 11 games as a rookie for the Voodoo with those 11 games he broke the franchise rookie record held by Kenny Henderson in 2007 by 29 yards having 924 yards with 74 catches his rookie season. When the VooDoo ceased operations on August 9, 2015, Jackson became a free agent.

=== Jacksonville Sharks ===
On October 16, 2015, Jackson was assigned to the Jacksonville Sharks.

=== Washington Valor ===
Jackson was assigned to the Washington Valor on January 10, 2017.

=== Jersey Flight ===
On February 2, 2020, Jackson signed with the Jersey Flight. The 2020 National Arena League season was canceled due to the Covid-19 pandemic.
