= Dwayne Hollis =

American football player (born 1989)

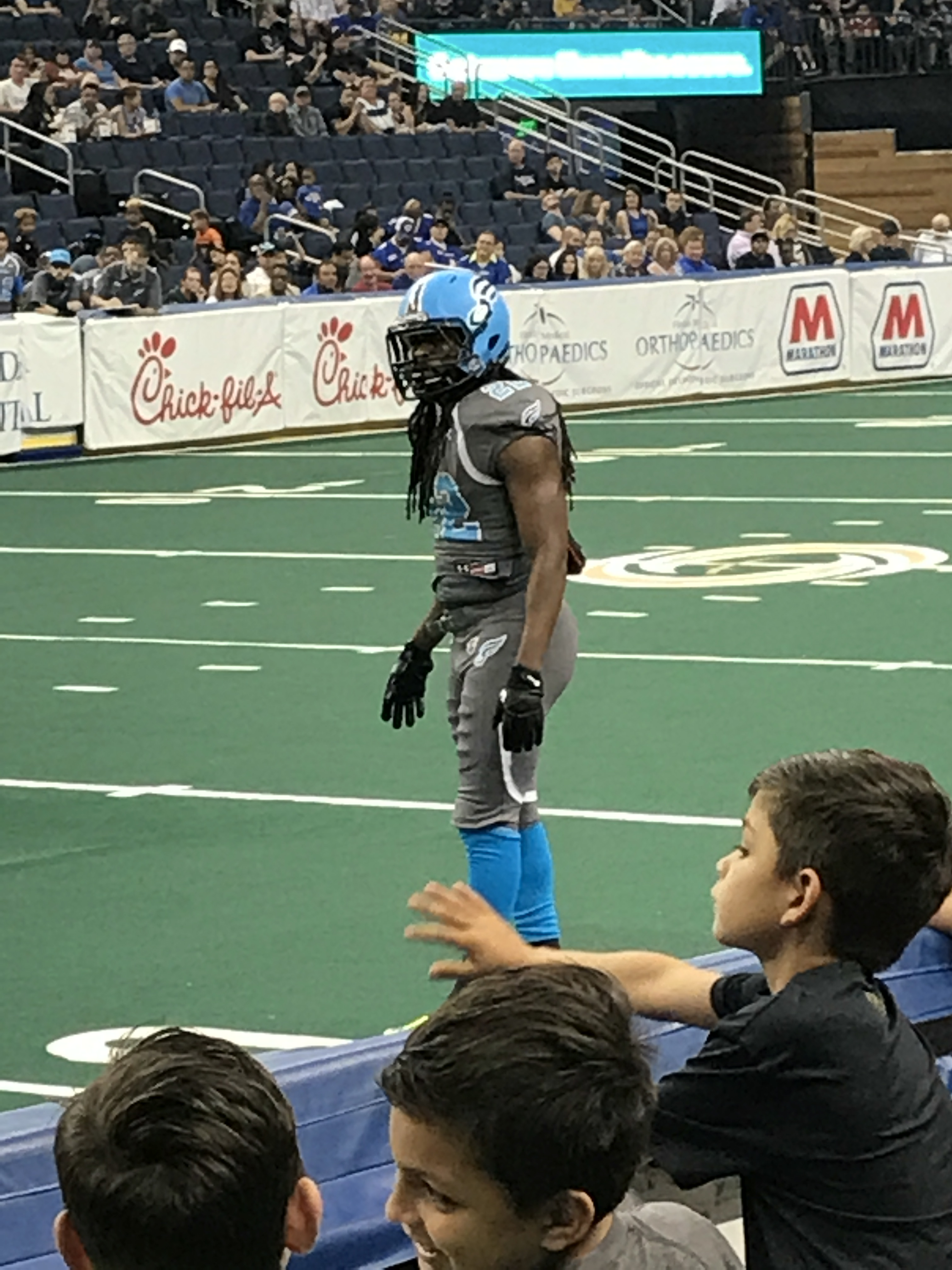
- Hollis with the Philadelphia Soul in 2017

Profile
- Position: Defensive back

Personal information
- Born: July 7, 1989 (age 37); Newport News, Virginia, U.S.
- Listed height: 5 ft 9 in (1.75 m)
- Listed weight: 184 lb (83 kg)

Career information
- High school: Denbigh (Newport News)
- College: North Carolina Wesleyan
- NFL draft: 2013: undrafted

Career history
- Helsinki Roosters (2013); Lehigh Valley Steelhawks (2014); Trenton Freedom (2015)*; Philadelphia Soul (2015–2018); Shanghai Skywalkers (2016–2018); Atlanta Legends (2019); Philadelphia Soul (2019); Albany Empire (2022–2023); Orlando Predators (2023); Corpus Christi Tritons (2025); Billings Outlaws (2025)
- * Offseason or practice squad member only

Awards and highlights
- 2× ArenaBowl champion (2016, 2017); First-team All-Arena (2017); 2× Second-team All-Arena (2016, 2018); AFL Defensive Back of the Year (2017); CAFL All-Pro South Division All-Star (2016); First-team All-PIFL (2014); PIFL Special Teams Player of the Year (2014); Finnish National Championship Vaahteramalja (2013); AFCA All-American (2012); 3× First-team All-USA South DB (2010–2012); 2× First-team All-USA South KR (2011, 2012)

Career AFL statistics
- Tackles: 287.5
- Pass breakups: 39
- Interceptions: 21
- Stats at ArenaFan.com

Dwayne Hollis (born July 7, 1989) is an American professional football defensive back. He played college football at North Carolina Wesleyan College. He has been a member of the Helsinki Roosters, Lehigh Valley Steelhawks, Trenton Freedom, Philadelphia Soul, Shanghai Skywalkers, Atlanta Legends, Albany Empire, Orlando Predators, Corpus Christi Tritons, and Billings Outlaws.

== Early life ==
Hollis attended Denbigh High School in Newport News, Virginia.

== College career ==
Hollis played for the North Carolina Wesleyan Battling Bishops from 2009 to 2012 and helped the Battling Bishops to 20 wins. As a sophomore, Hollis was named First Team All-USA South Athletic Conference as a Defensive Back. As a junior and senior, Hollis was named First Team All-USA South Athletic Conference as both a kick returner and as a defensive back. Hollis was also named an All-American at defensive back by the American Football Coaches Association.

== Professional career ==
Hollis signed with the Helsinki Roosters of Vaahteraliiga in 2013.

Hollis returned to the United States in 2014 when he signed with the Lehigh Valley Steelhawks of the Professional Indoor Football League (PIFL). Hollis was named First Team All-League as both a defensive back and kick returner. Hollis was also named the PIFL's Special Teams Player of the Year. Hollis was the only defensive player in the PIFL to lead his team in all-purpose yardage.

Hollis signed with the PIFL's Trenton Freedom for 2015, but he placed on the other league exempt list before the season began.

On October 6, 2014, Hollis was assigned to the Philadelphia Soul of the Arena Football League (AFL). On October 9, 2015, Hollis had his rookie option exercised by the Soul. Hollis was named Second Team All-Arena following the 2016 season. Hollis helped lead the Soul to an ArenaBowl XXIX championship. Hollis was once again assigned to the Soul for the 2017 season. He earned AFL Defensive Back of the Year and First Team All-Arena honors in 2017. On August 26, 2017, the Soul beat the Tampa Bay Storm in ArenaBowl XXX by a score of 44–40.

Hollis was selected by the Shanghai Skywalkers in the third round of the 2016 CAFL draft. He was named an All-Pro South Division All-Star. He is listed on the Skywalkers' roster for the 2018 season.

In 2019, Hollis joined the Alliance of American Football's Atlanta Legends.

Hollis was placed on the league suspension list as a member of the Soul on March 20, 2019, after he signed with the Legends of the AAF. After the AAF suspended football operations, he was activated from league suspension by the Soul on April 6, 2019.

On November 26, 2021, Hollis signed with the Albany Empire of the National Arena League (NAL). On December 5, 2022, Hollis re-signed with the Empire. On May 5, 2023, Hollis was released by the Empire.

On May 8, 2023, Hollis signed with the Orlando Predators of the NAL.

Hollis began the 2025 Arena Football One season as a member of the Corpus Christi Tritons. He was among ten players who left the Tritons on April 29, amid an ongoing investigation into the Tritons' finances.

On May 1, 2025, Hollis signed with the AF1's Billings Outlaws, along with three other former Tritons players.
