= Warren Smith (quarterback) =

American football player (born 1990)

No. 2, 8
- Position: Quarterback

Personal information
- Born: February 20, 1990 (age 36); Forked River, New Jersey, U.S.
- Listed height: 6 ft 0 in (1.83 m)
- Listed weight: 200 lb (91 kg)

Career information
- High school: Lacey Township (Lanoka Harbor, New Jersey)
- College: Iona (2008); Maine (2009–2011)
- NFL draft: 2012: undrafted

Career history

Playing
- Dresden Monarchs (2012); Richmond Raiders (2013); Trenton Freedom (2014); Spokane Shock (2015); Philadelphia Yellow Jackets (2016); Philadelphia Soul (2016)*; Lehigh Valley Steelhawks (2016); Tampa Bay Storm (2016); Lehigh Valley Steelhawks (2017); Baltimore Brigade (2017)*; Washington Valor (2017–2018); Atlantic City Blackjacks (2019); Jersey Flight (2020–2021); Jacksonville Sharks (2022); Albany Empire (2022)
- * Offseason or practice squad member only

Coaching
- Lacey Township HS (NJ) (2013–2024) Offensive coordinator & special teams coordinator; Absegami HS (NJ) (2025–present) Head coach

Awards and highlights
- ArenaBowl champion (2018); NAL champion (2022); NAL MVP (2017); PIFL MVP (2014); First-team All-NAL (2017); Second-team All-CAA (2011)

Career AFL statistics
- Comp. / Att.: 314 / 493
- Passing yards: 3,527
- TD–INT: 66–19
- QB rating: 102.38
- Rushing TD: 12
- Stats at ArenaFan.com

Warren Smith (born February 20, 1990) is an American former professional football quarterback. He is currently the head football coach for Absegami High School, a position he has held since 2025. He played college football for Iona and Maine. Smith played professionally for the Dresden Monarchs of the German Football League (GFL), the Richmond Raiders and Trenton Freedom of the Professional Indoor Football League (PIFL), the Spokane Shock, Tampa Bay Storm, Washington Valor, and Atlantic City Blackjacks of the Arena Football League (AFL), the Philadelphia Yellow Jackets of American Indoor Football (AIF), and the Lehigh Valley Steelhawks, Jersey Flight, Jacksonville Sharks, and Albany Empire of the National Arena League (NAL).

== Early life ==
Smith played high school football at Lacey Township High School in Lacey Township, New Jersey. He helped Lacey Township win the South Jersey Group III championship in 2006. Smith graduated in 2008.

== College career ==
Smith continued his football career playing for Iona College, where he was named the team's starting quarterback as a freshman in 2008. Following the 2008 season, Iona dropped football from its athletics programs, leaving the players the ability to transfer without sitting out a season. Smith decided to transfer to the University of Maine, where he won the starting quarterback position as a junior in 2010, leading the Black Bears to a 4–7 record. As a senior in 2011, he led the team to an 8–3 regular season record, helping the Black Bears qualify for the NCAA Championship Playoffs. The Black Bears won their first-round game, but lost in the second round to Georgia Southern. Smith was named second-team All-Colonial Athletic Association following the season.

== Professional career ==
=== Dresden Monarchs ===
In 2012, Smith signed with the Dresden Monarchs of the German Football League (GFL). Smith was the Monarchs leading passer and second leading rusher on the season. The Monarchs finished third in the northern division of the GFL with a 10–4 record and qualified for the play-offs where they were defeated by the Kiel Baltic Hurricanes in the semi-finals.

=== Richmond Raiders ===
In 2013, Smith signed with the Richmond Raiders of the Professional Indoor Football League (PIFL). Smith guided the Raiders to a 7–5 record during the regular season, tying the second best record in the PIFL. Smith and the Raiders won their playoff game against the Lehigh Valley Steelhawks, but would lose PIFL Cup II to the Alabama Hammers.

=== Trenton Freedom ===
In 2014, Smith signed with the expansion Trenton Freedom, also of the PIFL. Smith's impressive 46 touchdowns passing and 13 more rushing, led to him being named the 2014 PIFL MVP.

=== Spokane Shock ===
In October 2014, Smith was assigned to the Spokane Shock of the Arena Football League (AFL) for the 2015 season. Shortly after signing with the Shock, Smith, who was working as a substitute teacher at the time, acquired the Shock's video archive password from head coach Andy Olson and ended up watching every Shock 2014 regular season game during breaks in class. Smith made his first career AFL start for the Shock during their Week 7 game against the Los Angeles KISS, completing 23 of 29 attempts with six touchdowns in a 68–46 victory. He finished the season with 1,816 passing yards, 32 passing touchdowns, 11 interceptions and five rushing touchdowns in eight starts at quarterback.

=== Philadelphia Yellow Jackets ===
On October 15, 2015, Smith signed with the Philadelphia Yellow Jackets of American Indoor Football. On May 24, 2016, Smith was released.

=== Philadelphia Soul ===
On October 16, 2015, Smith was assigned to the Philadelphia Soul of the AFL. On February 5, 2016, Smith was reassigned by the Soul.

=== Lehigh Valley Steelhawks ===
On May 24, 2016, Smith signed with the Lehigh Valley Steelhawks of the National Arena League (NAL). He earned NAL MVP and first-team All-NAL honors in 2017 after playing in 10 games while completing 169 of 256 passes for 1,953 yards, 56 touchdowns and 8 interceptions. He re-signed with the Steelhawks in September 2017.

=== Tampa Bay Storm ===
On July 19, 2016, Smith was assigned to the AFL's Tampa Bay Storm. He completed two of two pass attempts for 21 yards in the Storm's playoff loss to the Philadelphia Soul. He also rushed once for three yards.

=== Baltimore Brigade ===
Smith was the eighth, and final, player selected by the Baltimore Brigade of the AFL in the January 2017 expansion draft. He was placed on league suspension on February 10, 2017. On July 13, 2017, the Brigade placed Smith on reassignment.

=== Washington Valor ===
On July 14, 2017, Smith was claimed off reassignment by the Washington Valor. He started the team's final game of the season, completing 21 of 35 passes for 229 yards, 5 touchdowns and 2 interceptions in a 41–35 win against the Baltimore Brigade. He also scored a rushing touchdown in the game. On March 21, 2018, he was assigned to the Valor. On May 22, 2018, he was placed on reassignment, but was reassigned to the Valor on May 24.

=== Atlantic City Blackjacks ===
On March 5, 2019, Smith was assigned to the Atlantic City Blackjacks of the AFL. He was the backup to Randy Hippeard during the 2019 season but saw playing time due to injuries. Overall, Smith completed 84 of 126 passes (66.7%) for 994 yards, 19 touchdowns, and four interceptions in 2019 while also rushing for five touchdowns. He suffered a foot injury in July 2019.

=== Jersey Flight ===
On January 9, 2020, Smith signed with the NAL's Jersey Flight. The 2020 NAL season was canceled due to the COVID-19 pandemic. On September 2, 2020, he re-signed with the Flight for the 2021 season. Smith played in all eight games for Jersey in 2021, completing 167 passes for 1,561 yards and 25 touchdowns while also scoring four rushing touchdowns.

=== Jacksonville Sharks ===
On February 9, 2022, Smith signed with the Jacksonville Sharks for the 2022 NAL season.

=== Albany Empire ===
A few weeks into the 2022 season, he was traded to the Albany Empire for quarterback Mike Fafaul. Smith won the 2022 NAL title as the backup quarterback for the Empire. He completed 17 of 21 passes for 146 yards and six touchdowns during the 2022 season.

=== AFL statistics ===
Legend
	Won the ArenaBowl
**Bold**	Career high

Year	Team	Passing							Rushing		
Year	Team	Cmp	Att	Pct	Yds	TD	Int	Rtg	Att	Yds	TD
2015	Spokane	**158**	**249**	63.5	**1,816**	**32**	**11**	99.07	**31**	**119**	**5**
2017	Washington	21	35	60.0	229	5	2	91.25	6	35	1
2018	Washington	51	83	61.4	488	10	2	97.87	10	30	1
2019	Atlantic City	84	126	**66.7**	994	19	4	**114.98**	12	48	**5**
Career		314	493	63.7	3,527	66	19	102.38	59	232	12

== Coaching career ==
In 2013, Smith rejoined his alma mater, Lacey Township High School, as the school's offensive coordinator and special teams coordinator. He also coached basketball at Lacey Township, and taught health and physical education. He was hired as the head football coach for Absegami High School in 2025.
