= Georgia Fire =

General information
- Founded: 2014
- Folded: 2014
- Headquartered: Rome, Georgia at the Forum Civic Center
- Colors: Red, Black, Gold, White

Personnel
- Owner: PIFL
- General manager: Jeff Gonos
- Head coach: Cosmo Dematteo

Team history
- Georgia Fire (2014)

Home fields
- Forum Civic Center (2014)

League / conference affiliations
- Professional Indoor Football League (2014): American Conference (2014)

The Georgia Fire were a professional indoor football team based in Rome, Georgia. They were members of the American Conference in the Professional Indoor Football League (PIFL) during the 2014 season.

The Fire joined the PIFL in 2014 as an expansion team, after the PIFL was forced to find a replacement team for the Albany Panthers, who were kicked out of their home arena by city official in Albany. They are the latest franchise to play indoor football after the Rome Renegades of the now-defunct National Indoor Football League (NIFL).

The Fire played their home games at the Forum Civic Center in Rome.

== Franchise history ==
With complications surrounding the Albany Panthers franchise for the 2014 season, the Professional Indoor Football League (PIFL) introduced the Fire to replace the Panthers for the 2014 season. With the league running the team, PIFL Executive Director, Jeff Ganos was named the franchise's general manager and Cosmo DeMatteo was named the team's innaurgal head coach on February 27, 2014. With the season starting on April 5, 2014, the Fire were given the Panthers roster, where players who didn't wish to play for the new franchise, refused to report. In the first game in franchise history, the Fire knocked off defending PIFL Champions, the Alabama Hammers by a score of 57-55.

== Players of note ==
=== Final roster ===
Georgia Fire roster
Quarterbacks: -- Barry Brunetti; 7 Cecil Lester; 10 Chris Mitchell; Running backs: 21 Xavier Stinson; Wide receivers: 6 Antwontis Cutts; 9 Ronald Davis; -- Terrence Ebagua; 4 John Harris; 1 Johnny Lester	Offensive linemen: 50 Jeremy Buchanan; 59 Brandon McElroy; 72 Jason Peacock; 77 Aaron Wheeler; Defensive linemen: 94 Clinton Barley; 92 Joe Marshall; 19 Elisee Pmoplius; 15 Jerome Raymond	Linebackers: 5 Larry Edwards; 8 Adrian McLeoad; 41 Robert Russell; Defensive backs: 17 Boubacar Cissoko; 27 Robert Durham; 3 Kieron Jones; 2 Demetrie McCray; 16 Billy McGahee; Kickers: 13 Ryan Gates	Injured reserve: 99 Ishmyl Johnson DL; 75 Kevin McAlmont OL; 11 Clenton Rafe WR; 12 Nathan Wade WR; Exempt list: currently vacant; Failure to report-exempt: -- Archie Alexander OL; -- Vauchard Goodridge DL; -- Darian Payne LB; -- James Stallons QB; -- Derrick Wimbush FB; rookies in italics; Roster updated June 5, 2014; 26 Active, 9 Inactive

=== All-League players ===
The following Fire players were named to All-League Teams:

- WR Johnny Lester, John Harris
- OL Aaron Wheeler
- LB Adrian McLeod

== Coaches of note ==
=== Head coaches ===
Name	Term	Regular season				Playoffs		Awards
Name	Term	W	L	T	Win%	W	L	Awards
Cosmo DeMatteo	2014	4	8	0	.333	0	0	

=== Coaching staff ===
Georgia Fire staff
Front office: General manager – Jeff Ganos	Head coach: Head coach – vacant

== Season-by-season results ==
League champions	Conference champions	Division champions	Wild card berth	League leader

Season	Team	League	Conference	Division	Regular season				Postseason results
Season	Team	League	Conference	Division	Finish	Wins	Losses	Ties	Postseason results
2014	2014	PIFL	American		3rd	4	8	0	
Totals						4	8	0	All-time regular season record (2014)
Totals						0	0	-	All-time postseason record (2014)
Totals						4	8	0	All-time regular season and postseason record (2014)
