= Phillip Barnett =

American football player (born 1990)

Profile
- Position: Wide receiver

Personal information
- Born: June 3, 1990 (age 36); Middletown, Ohio, U.S.
- Listed height: 6 ft 3 in (1.91 m)
- Listed weight: 215 lb (98 kg)

Career information
- High school: Middletown (OH)
- College: Toledo
- NFL draft: 2011: undrafted

Career history
- Cincinnati Commandos (2011–2012); Texas Revolution (2013); Nashville Venom (2014–2015); Tampa Bay Storm (2015–2016); Wichita Falls Nighthawks (2017); Cleveland Gladiators (2017); Carolina Cobras (2018); Washington Valor (2019); Jacksonville Sharks (2021); Albany Empire (2021); San Antonio Gunslingers (2022)*; Frisco Fighters (2022); San Antonio Gunslingers (2022–2023); Albany Firebirds (2024)
- * Offseason or practice squad member only

Awards and highlights
- CIFL Champion (2011); 1st Team All-UIFL North (2012); UIFL Champion (2012); PIFL Offensive Player of the Year (2014); PIFL Champion (2014); NAL Champion (2021)

Career AFL statistics
- Receptions: 107
- Receiving yards: 1,048
- Receiving TDs: 22
- Tackles: 13
- Stats at ArenaFan.com

Phillip Barnett (born June 3, 1990) is an American football wide receiver. He played college football at the University of Toledo.

== College career ==
Barnett signed a letter of intent with the University of Toledo to play football, however he never appeared in a single game for the Rockets.

== Professional career ==
=== Cincinnati Commandos ===
Barnett signed with the Cincinnati Commandos of the Continental Indoor Football League (CIFL). Barnett helped the Commandos to an undefeated 2011 season, winning the 2011 CIFL Championship Game. Barnett returned to the Commandos in 2012, helping the Commandos claim another championship, this time in the Ultimate Indoor Football League (UIFL).

=== Texas Revolution ===
In 2013, the Commandos folded, and Barnett followed head coach Billy Back to the Texas Revolution of the Indoor Football League (IFL).

=== Nashville Venom ===
In 2014, Barnett once again followed head coach Billy Back, this time to the Nashville Venom of the Professional Indoor Football League (PIFL). Barnett was named the Offensive Player of the Year in the PIFL, helping the Venom to a 10–2 record, and a PIFL Championship.

=== Tampa Bay Storm ===
On March 20, 2015, Barnett was assigned to the Tampa Bay Storm of the Arena Football League (AFL).

=== Wichita Falls Nighthawks ===
On October 20, 2016, Barnett signed with the Wichita Falls Nighthawks. On April 27, 2017, Barnett was placed on the transfer list.

=== Cleveland Gladiators ===
On January 9, 2017, Barnett was assigned to the Cleveland Gladiators. On February 10, 2017, Barnett was placed on league suspension. On May 2, 2017, he was activated from league suspension. On June 12, 2017, Barnett was placed on reassignment. On June 14, 2017, Barnett was once again assigned to the Gladiators.

=== Washington Valor ===
On March 19, 2019, Barnett was assigned to the Washington Valor.

=== Jacksonville Sharks ===
On October 13, 2020, Barnett signed with the Jacksonville Sharks of the National Arena League (NAL).

=== Albany Empire ===
On May 27, 2021, Barnett was traded to the Albany Empire of the National Arena League (NAL).

=== San Antonio Gunslingers ===
On January 14, 2022, Barnett signed with the San Antonio Gunslingers of the National Arena League (NAL). On March 31, 2022, Barnett was released by the Gunslingers after being suspended indefinitely by the league.

=== Frisco Fighters ===
On April 6, 2022, Barnett signed with the Frisco Fighters of the Indoor Football League (IFL). Barnett was released on May 31, 2022.

=== San Antonio Gunslingers (second stint) ===
On June 2, 2022, Barnett signed with the San Antonio Gunslingers of the National Arena League (NAL) after having his suspension lifted by the league. On October 23, 2022, Barnett re-signed with the Gunslingers. Barnett became a free agent at the end of the season.

=== Albany Firebirds ===
On March 6, 2024, Barnett signed with the Albany Firebirds of the Arena Football League (AFL).
