= Jersey Flight =

Indoor American football team (2017–2022)

Logo

General information
- Founded: 2017
- Folded: 2022
- Headquartered: Trenton, New Jersey at the CURE Insurance Arena
- Colors: Blue, gold, silver, white
- JerseyFlightFootball.com

Personnel
- Owners: New Flight Enterprises, LLC
- General manager: Terry Foster
- Head coach: Terry Foster

Team history
- Jersey Flight (2018–2021)

Home fields
- CURE Insurance Arena (2018–2021)

League / conference affiliations
- American Arena League (2018–2019); Northern Division (2019); National Arena League (2020–2021)

Playoff appearances (1)
- 2019

The Jersey Flight was a professional indoor football team based in Trenton, New Jersey. The team played its first two seasons in the American Arena League (AAL) and then as a member of the National Arena League (NAL) from 2020 to 2021. They were owned by New Flight Enterprises, LLC, and played at the CURE Insurance Arena as their home arena.

== History ==
The Jersey Flight was announced to be joining the National Arena League (NAL) at a press conference on March 20, 2017. Jersey Flight Football, Inc., was reported to be the first 100% African-American-owned professional sports franchise in the state of New Jersey. The Flight announced the franchise's first head coach would be Jake Grande, former assistant coach and defensive coordinator of the Jacksonville Sharks. The owners heavily pursued sponsors and partnerships in order to pay for multiple years of stability. However, the team did not meet the NAL's updated minimum obligations prior to the release of the 2018 schedule in December 2017 and was subsequently removed from the league without playing a game. A few days later, the Flight announced they had joined the recently formed American Arena League (AAL) for the 2018 season.

After two games played, owners Samuel Davis, Jr. and Kyna Felder-Ruiz were arrested for tax fraud on April 13, 2018. The team finished the season with an official record of 5–3.

In December 2018, the team announced William Thomas as the new general manager and Adam Turkel as head coach for the 2019 season. On March 1, 2019, Turkel was informed he had been let go and claimed the team was folding. However, the Flight announced on March 10 they were playing under new ownership and Nick Coppola had been named head coach. The new ownership was later revealed as New Flight Enterprises, LLC. led by Jay Sababu with operations managed by Willard Stanback. Due to the late ownership change, the team started the 2019 season late and only played three games against other AAL teams, going 2–1. The team made the divisional playoffs as two of the four teams in the division did not finish the season, and lost to the undefeated West Virginia Roughriders. Head coach Coppola then left the team after the season.

In October 2019, the NAL announced the Flight, under their new ownership, was re-approved to join for the 2020 season along with the West Virginia Roughriders. The team then named Terry Foster as head coach and general manager. As the 2020 NAL season was cancelled due to the onset of the COVID-19 pandemic, the Flight did not make their league debut until May 28, 2021, in a 45–42 home loss to the Carolina Cobras. The Flight finished their inaugural NAL season with a 2–6 record and missed the playoffs. Following the 2021 season, the Flight was not listed as a member of the NAL for the 2022 season.

In January 2022, the Arena Professional Football League, a new league started by the owners of the Charlotte Thunder, announced the Flight as a member team, but were later replaced by a team called the Jersey Ballaz. Terry Foster has since gone on to become commissioner of American Indoor Football and general manager/head coach of the league's Midland Frac-Attack in 2026.

== Notable players ==
See Category:Jersey Flight players
