= Trenton Freedom =

American indoor football team

Logo

General information
- Founded: 2013
- Folded: 2015
- Headquartered: Sun National Bank Center in Trenton, New Jersey
- Colors: Red, Silver, Blue, White
- Mascot: General George

Personnel
- Owners: Dennis Williams; Michael Schubiger
- General manager: Jeff Gonos
- Head coach: Kevin O’Hanlon
- President: Dennis Williams

Team history
- Trenton Freedom (2014–2015)

Home fields
- Sun National Bank Center (2014–2015)

League / conference affiliations
- Professional Indoor Football League (2014–2015): National Conference (2014)

Playoff appearances (1)
- PIFL: 2014

The Trenton Freedom was a professional indoor football team based in Trenton, New Jersey. The Freedom were a member of the Professional Indoor Football League (PIFL). The Freedom began play in 2014 as an expansion member of the PIFL. The Freedom played their home games at the Sun National Bank Center.

== Franchise history ==
=== 2014 ===
In August 2013, Owners Dennis Williams and Michael Schubiger announced their intentions to bring an indoor football team back to Trenton, New Jersey. The owners held name the team contest, and picked the name "Freedom," as well as named Adam Turkel to be the team's first head coach and general manager. When looking for a league to play in, Williams and Schubiger both were lobbying to become members of the Professional Indoor Football League (PIFL). In September, the team officially became the 7th member of the PIFL for the 2014 season. In November 2013, the team announced that they were replacing Turkel with Kevin O'Hanlon as the team's inaugural coach.

The Freedom began their inaugural season on March 30, 2014 at home, defeating the Richmond Raiders 52–17. Quarterback Warren Smith threw for four touchdowns and ran for two more. Defensive Back Domonic Joseph was named PIFL Defensive Player of the Week. The Freedom lost their first road game, 48–47 at the Lehigh Valley Steelhawks. Wide receiver Antoine Rivera caught 13 passes for 132 yards and a pair of touchdowns.

The Freedom rebounded in their second home game for a 66–63 win over the Columbus Lions. The Freedom suffered their second road loss, 42–36 at Lehigh Valley April 26, but linebacker Jeffery Morgan earned the franchise's second PIFL Defensive Player of the Week honor by scoring a pair of touchdowns. Success continued at home May 3, as the Freedom rallied with 16 points in the last two minutes to edge Richmond, 33–32, with Marques Slocum earning PIFL Defensive Player of the Week. The winning trend at home continued May 11 with a 52–39 triumph over the Harrisburg Stampede as William Hollis was named PIFL Defensive Player of the week, the team's third straight selection.

With a 52–42 win at Richmond, May 17, the Freedom recorded the franchise's first-ever road victory. The following week, back at home, the Freedom avenged two earlier losses to Lehigh Valley with a 55–42 victory to push their record to a PIFL-best 6–2 atop the National Conference.

The Freedom, with a 57–49 win at Harrisburg June 7, clinched a PIFL playoff berth in its first season in moving to 7–2.

With a 49–47 comeback win over the defending PIFL champion Alabama Hammers June 14, the Freedom clinched the regular-season National Conference title and a home playoff game in the franchise's first season.

The Freedom dropped a 52–49 decision to the Georgia Fire in the team's final regular-season home game.

The Freedom finished the regular season with an 8–4 record, the 2nd best in the league, but were defeated by the Lehigh Valley Steelhawks in the National Conference Championship Game by a score of 49–38.

=== 2015 ===
On August 26, 2015, the Freedom announced that they wouldn't be returning to play in 2016.

== Players of note ==
=== Awards and honors ===
The following is a list of all Freedom players who won league awards:

Season	Player	Position	Award
2014	Roger Jackson	WR	Offensive Rookie of the Year
2014	Warren Smith	QB	Most Valuable Player
2015	Jerome Hayes	LB	Defensive Player of the Year

=== All-League players ===
The following Freedom players were named to All-League Teams:

- QB Warren Smith
- FB Melik Brown (2)
- WR Richie Martin
- OL Lavon McCoy (2), Malcolm Speller
- DL Gerrard Bryant, Michael Atunarse
- LB Jerome Hayes
- DB Mike McMillian
- Iron-man Melik Brown (2)

== Head coaches ==
Name	Term	Regular season				Playoffs		Awards
Name	Term	W	L	T	Win%	W	L	Awards
Kevin O'Hanlon	2014–2015	14	10	0	.583	0	1	

== Season-by-season results ==
League champions	Conference champions	Division champions	Wild card berth	League leader

Season	Team	League	Conference	Division	Regular season				Postseason results
Season	Team	League	Conference	Division	Finish	Wins	Losses	Ties	Postseason results
2014	2014	PIFL	National		1st	8	4	0	Lost National Conference Title 39-43 vs. (Lehigh Valley)
2015	2015	PIFL			5th	6	6	0	
Totals						14	10	0	All-time regular season record (2014–2015)
Totals						0	1	-	All-time postseason record (2014–2015)
Totals						14	11	0	All-time regular season and postseason record (2014–2015)
