= Lehigh Valley Steelhawks =

Indoor football team in Pennsylvania, US

- Current season
Logo

General information
- Founded: 2010
- Folded: 2019
- Headquartered: Allentown, Pennsylvania at the PPL Center
- Colors: Black, Vegas gold, white
- Mascot: Talon
- LVSteelhawks.com

Personnel
- Owner: Glenn Clark
- General manager: Michael Clark
- Head coach: Danton Barto
- President: Glenn Clark

Team history
- Lehigh Valley Steelhawks (2011–2018)

Home fields
- Stabler Arena in Bethlehem (2011–2014); PPL Center in Allentown (2015–2018)

League / conference affiliations
- Indoor Football League (2011–2012): United Conference (2011–2012); Atlantic Division (2011); Professional Indoor Football League (2013–2015): National Conference (2014); American Indoor Football (2016): Northern Division (2016); National Arena League (2017–2018)

Championships
- Conference championships: 1 PIFL: 2014

Playoff appearances (6)
- IFL: 2012; PIFL: 2013, 2014, 2015; AIF: 2016; NAL: 2017

The Lehigh Valley Steelhawks were a professional indoor football team based in Allentown, Pennsylvania. The Steelhawks began play as an expansion team in the Indoor Football League (IFL) in 2011.

The Steelhawks moved to the Professional Indoor Football League (PIFL) in 2013, where they made their only championship game appearance, losing PIFL Cup III to the Nashville Venom. The team joined American Indoor Football for the 2016 season after the PIFL folded, which lasted one season before that league also folded. They joined the National Arena League for the 2017 and 2018 seasons. The Steelhawks were the Lehigh Valley's second indoor football team, following the also-defunct Lehigh Valley Outlawz of the Continental Indoor Football League (2005–2008). The Outlawz played their home games at Stabler Arena in Bethlehem, Pennsylvania until 2014. In 2015, they began playing their home games at the PPL Center on Hamilton Street in Allentown.

Steelhawks owner Glenn Clark sought to sell the team following the 2018 season. After failing to find new ownership for the Steelhawks, the team suspended operations before the 2019 season. The "hiatus" became permanent when no suitable buyer was ever found.

== History ==
In July 2010, the Indoor Football League (IFL) announced that there would be an expansion franchise placed in Lehigh Valley for the 2011 season. It was also announced that the team would be owned by Glenn W. Clark, a Wilmington, Delaware businessman. Later in July the team announced that they had named Dan Kuhn as the team's general manager and would be holding a "Name The Team" contest was held to choose a name for the organization. Over 700 names were submitted and the top five were chosen by management. These names were Vipers, Ironmen, Blast, Gamblers, and Steelhawks. Fans were then asked to vote on the name they thought would be best for the team with over 70% of the votes being cast for Steelhawks. Brooke Trautwein, the fan who submitted the Steelhawks name, was given a prize package that included season tickets and Steelhawks' merchandise.

In August 2013, Clark announced that the Steelhawks would be leaving the IFL for the Professional Indoor Football League (PIFL) after two seasons. The Steelhawks finished in second place overall in the 2013 PIFL season, but lost their semifinal playoff game.

The Steelhawks finished the 2014 season with a 6–6 record and second in the National Conference. The Steelhawks defeated the Trenton Freedom by a score of 49–38 in the National Conference championship game to advance to PIFL Cup III. where they were defeated 43–64 by the Nashville Venom.

In the 2015 season, the Steelhawks announced that they would be moving to the newly constructed PPL Center. They finished fourth overall in the PIFL and lost their semifinal playoff game to the Columbus Lions.

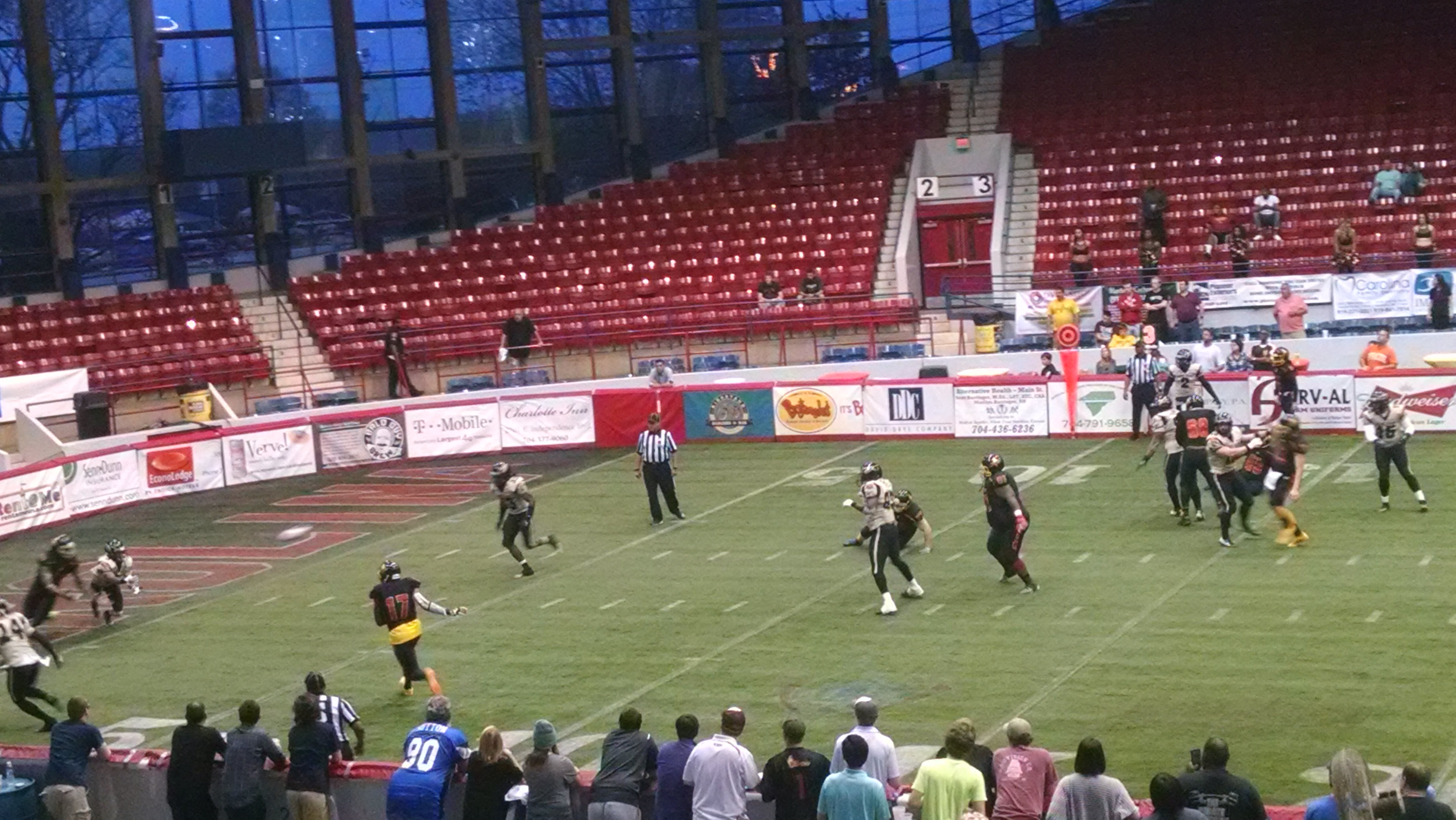
Triangle Torch (black jerseys with red and yellow accents) vs. Lehigh Valley Steelhawks (gold jerseys with black accents) during a game at Dorton Arena in Raleigh, North Carolina, March 25, 2016

With the PIFL not having enough teams to remain viable, the Steelhawks moved to American Indoor Football (AIF) for the 2016 season. The Steelhawks finished third in the North Division and made it to the division championship game before losing to the West Michigan Ironmen. After the season ended, the team announced it would not be returning to the AIF for the 2017 season.

On July 19, 2016, the Steelhawks announced they had joined the Arena Developmental League (which became the National Arena League) as a charter member of the new league. In the NAL's inaugural 2017 season, the Steelhawks finished in second place overall before losing at home to the third place Columbus Lions in the semifinal playoff game.

Following the season, the Steelhawks franchise's only head coach Chris Thompson left the team to take an offensive coordinator position with the Arena Football League's Albany Empire expansion team for the 2018 season. The Steelhawks hired Danton Barto as the new head coach for the 2018 season and the team finished with a 0–15 record. At the end of the season, owner Glenn Clark and president Mike Clark announced the Steelhawks were for sale. The team announced a hiatus prior to the 2019 season while continuing to seek new ownership. After closing up shop, the team's turf would be acquired by the IFL's Oakland Panthers, who now go by the Bay Area Pathers after a move to San Jose. In 2026, that turf has since been acquired by the NAL's Pueblo Punishers.

== Season-by-season results ==
League champions	Conference champions	Division champions	Playoff berth	League leader

Season	Team	League	Conference	Division	Regular season				Postseason results
Season	Team	League	Conference	Division	Finish	Wins	Losses	Ties	Postseason results
2011	2011	IFL	United	Atlantic	2nd	4	10	0	
2012	2012	IFL	United		4th	6	8	0	Lost United Conference Semi-final 21–79 vs. Sioux Falls
2013	2013	PIFL			2nd	7	5	0	Lost PIFL Semi-final 40–44 vs. Richmond
2014	2014	PIFL	National		2nd	6	6	0	Won National Conference Championship 49–38 vs. Trenton; Lost PIFL Cup III 43–64 vs. Nashville
2015	2015	PIFL			4th	6	5	0	Lost PIFL Semifinal 41–69 vs. Columbus
2016	2016	AIF		Northern	3rd	6	2	0	Won Northern Semifinal 54–52 vs. River City; Lost Northern Championship 35–42 vs. West Michigan
2017	2017	NAL			2nd	9	1	0	Lost Semifinal 50–52 vs. Columbus
2018	2018	NAL			6th	0	15	0	
Totals						44	52	0	All-time regular season record (2011–2018)
Totals						2	6	—	All-time postseason record (2011–2018)
Totals						46	58	0	All-time regular season and postseason record (2011–2018)

== Notable players ==
See Category:Lehigh Valley Steelhawks players

=== Awards and honors ===
The following is a list of all Steelhawks players who have won league awards:

Offensive Rookie of the Year
Season	Player	Position
2013	Thomas Gilson	WR

Special Teams of the Year
Season	Player	Position
2014	Dwayne Hollis	KR

Defensive Rookie of the Year
Season	Player	Position
2015	Joe Powell	DB

Most Valuable Player
Season	Player	Position
2017	Warren Smith	QB

Most Improved Player
Season	Player	Position
2017	Warren Oliver	WR
