= Nashville Venom =

Professional indoor football team

Logo

General information
- Founded: 2013
- Folded: 2015
- Headquartered: Nashville Municipal Auditorium in Nashville, Tennessee
- Colors: Green, Silver, Black, White
- Mascot: Freddie Fangs

Personnel
- Owners: Jeff Knight; Terry Burns
- General manager: Billy Back
- Head coach: Billy Back

Team history
- Nashville Venom (2014–2015)

Home fields
- Nashville Municipal Auditorium (2014–2015)

League / conference affiliations
- Professional Indoor Football League (2014–2015): American Conference (2014)

Championships
- League championships: 1: 2014
- Conference championships: 1: 2014

Playoff appearances (2)
- 2014, 2015

The Nashville Venom were a professional indoor football team, one of eight franchises of the Professional Indoor Football League (PIFL). Based in Nashville, Tennessee, the Venom were members of the American Conference. The team began play in 2014 as an expansion team. The team played at Nashville Municipal Auditorium in Nashville, which opened in 1962.

The Venom were the second indoor/arena football team to call Nashville home, and the first since the Arena Football League's Nashville Kats (1997–2001 and 2005–07).

After two seasons and the folding of the PIFL, the Venom ceased operations in 2015.

== Franchise history ==
=== 2014 ===
In November, 2012, it was announced that the Venom would be the eighth and final expansion team of the Professional Indoor Football League for the 2014 season. A few days after being introduced it was announced by Managing Partner Jeff Knight that Billy Back would be the first coach in Venom history. The Venom began their inaugural season on March 29, 2014, in Huntsville, Alabama against the Alabama Hammers. Their first home game was on April 5, against the Harrisburg Stampede. The Venom finished the regular season 10-2, the best record in the league, and won the American Conference regular season title. Their nine All-PIFL selected players were the most of any team. In the American Conference Championship Game, the Venom defeated the Columbus Lions 44-39 to advance to PIFL Cup III. On July 12, 2014, the Venom won their first PIFL Cup Championship, defeating the Lehigh Valley Steelhawks 64-43.

=== 2015 ===
Following the 2015 PIFL season, the league folded and the franchise folded soon afterward.

== Players of note ==
=== Awards and honors ===
The following is a list of all Venom players who have won league awards:

Season	Player	Position	Award
2014	Phillip Barnett	WR	Offensive Player of the Year

=== All-League players ===
The following Venom players have been named to All-League Teams:

- WR Phillip Barnett, Jordan Jolly (2)
- OL Chris Thompson, Stanlee Bradley
- DL Wayne Daniels, James Frazier, Walter Thomas
- LB Cobrani Mixion, Douglas Rippy, Will Johnson
- DB Scooter Rogers, Corry Stewart (2), Kenny Veal
- K Christian Reed
- KR Mike Whittaker

== Head coaches ==
Name	Term	Regular season				Playoffs		Awards
Name	Term	W	L	T	Win%	W	L	Awards
Billy Back	2014–2015	17	6	0	.739	2	1	PIFL Coach of the Year (2014)

== Season-by-season results ==
League champions	Conference champions	Division champions	Wild card berth	League leader

Season	Team	League	Conference	Division	Regular season				Postseason results
Season	Team	League	Conference	Division	Finish	Wins	Losses	Ties	Postseason results
2014	2014	PIFL	American		1st	10	2	0	Won American Conference Championship 44–39 vs. Columbus; Won PIFL Cup III 64–34 vs. Lehigh Valley
2015	2015	PIFL			3rd	7	4	0	Lost Semi-Finals 35–54 vs. Richmond
Totals						17	6	0	All-time regular season record (2014–2015)
Totals						2	1	—	All-time postseason record (2014–2015)
Totals						19	7	0	All-time regular season and postseason record (2014–2015)
