= Forum River Center =

Multi-purpose arena and convention center in Rome, Georgia, United States

- The Forum
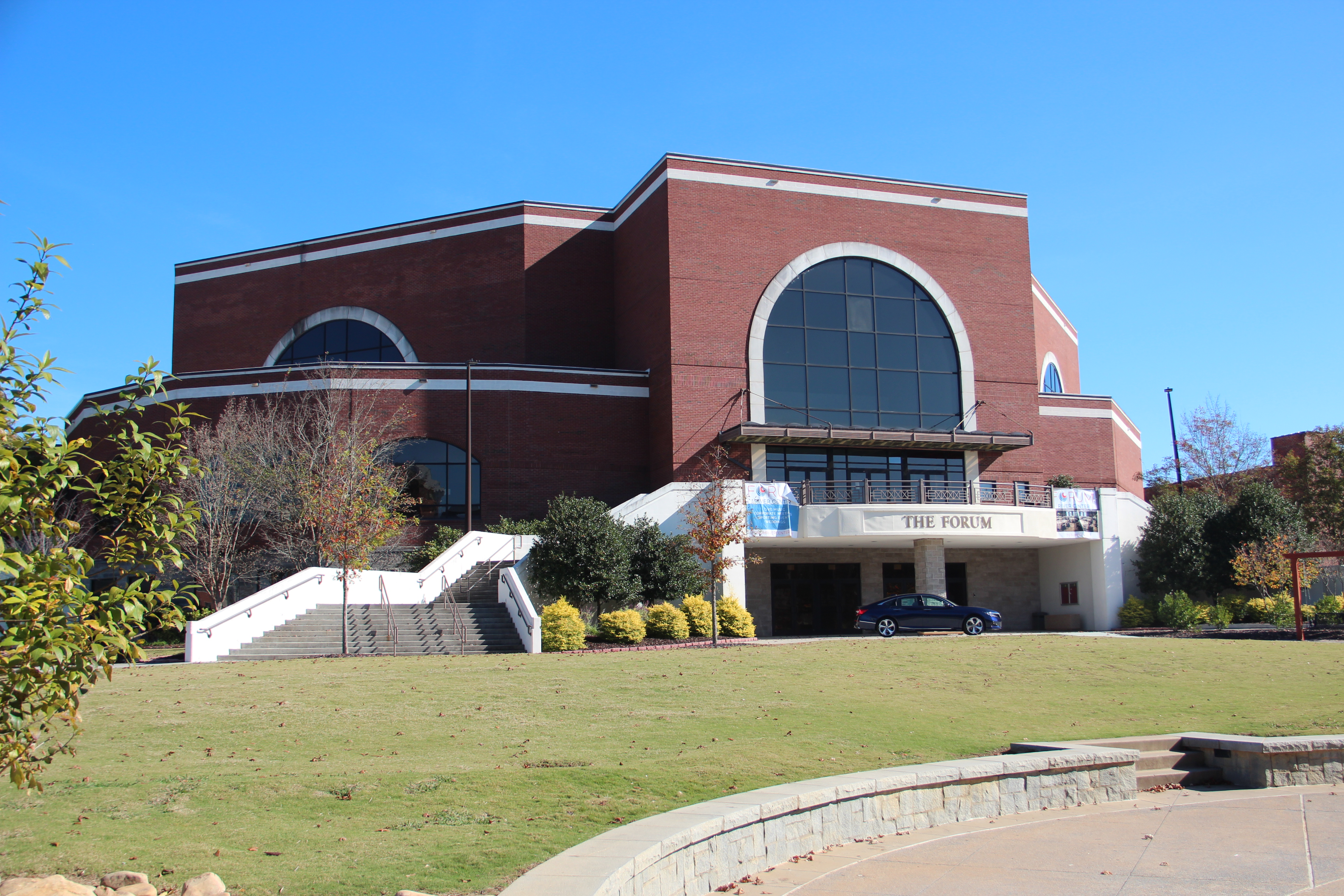
- The Forum in 2017
- Interactive map of Forum River Center
- Address: 301 Tribune Street; Rome, Georgia; United States
- Coordinates: 34°15′18″N 85°10′21″W
- Surface: 200' x 85' (hockey)

Tenants
- Georgia Fire (PIFL) (2014); Rome Red Cats (AAL) (2027–present)

The Forum River Center (known locally as The Forum) is a multi-purpose arena and convention center in Rome, Georgia, United States. It seats 2,140 for arena football, up to 3,116 for other sporting events and up to 3,932 for concerts. For trade shows, it can accommodate 21,000 square feet (2,000 m^{2}) of space. Meeting rooms at the Forum total an additional 14,269 square feet (1326 m^{2}) of space. Floyd County owns the Forum. The Forum was previously home to the Georgia Fire indoor football team. Its maximum capacity was about 4,500 people.

On March 9, 2024, just before the 2024 Republican Party presidential primaries in the state, former president Donald Trump held his campaign rally in the Forum River Center.
