= Giant Center =

Arena in Hershey, Pennsylvania

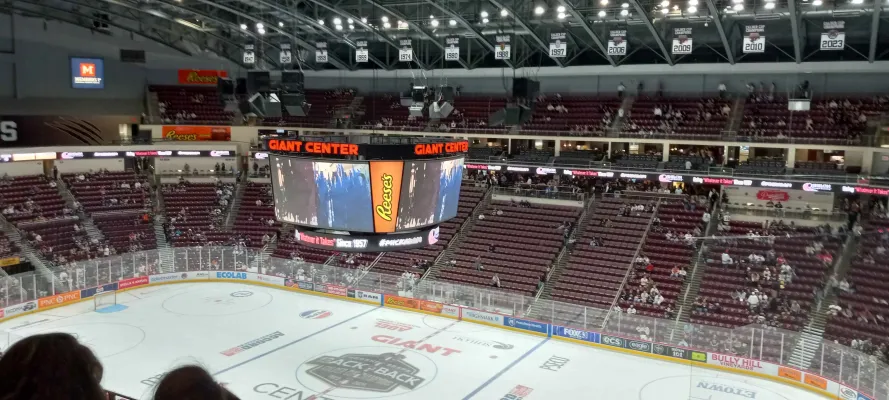
- The Interior of Giant Center in October 2024

- Location within Pennsylvania Location within the United States
- Address: 550 West Hersheypark Drive
- Location: Hershey, Pennsylvania, U.S.
- Coordinates: 40°17′11″N 76°40′9″W
- Owner: Derry Township Industrial and Commercial Development Authority
- Operator: Hershey Entertainment and Resorts Company
- Capacity: 12,500 (concerts); 10,500 (hockey)
- Field size: 17,000 square feet (1,600 m^{2})

Construction
- Groundbreaking: November 8, 2000
- Opened: October 15, 2002
- Cost: $65 million ($116 million in 2025 dollars)
- Architect: HOK Sport
- Project managers: Reynolds Construction Management, Inc.
- Structural engineer: Century Engineering
- Services engineers: Smith Seckman Reid, Inc.
- General contractor: Hunt/Whiting-Turner

Tenants
- Hershey Bears (AHL) 2002–present Harrisburg Stampede (PIFL) 2014

Website
- hersheyentertainment.com/giant-center

Giant Center (stylized as GIANT Center) is a 10,500-seat multi-purpose arena in Hershey, Pennsylvania, United States. It is home to the Hershey Bears ice hockey team, the longest-existing member of the American Hockey League, operating since 1938. Giant Center replaced Hersheypark Arena as the Bears' home venue in 2002.

Giant Center is owned by the Derry Township Industrial and Commercial Development Authority, as much of the money for its construction was provided by the Commonwealth of Pennsylvania. It is operated by Hershey Entertainment and Resorts Company, with the naming rights owned by the Giant-Carlisle grocery store chain based in Carlisle, Pennsylvania.

Giant Center has 7,700 seats in the lower level and 2,800 seats in the upper level. The arena also has 688 club seats and 40 luxury suites. Wheelchair and companion seating is available on all levels.

== Notable events ==
In addition to serving as the home arena for the Hershey Bears ice hockey team, Giant Center hosts an annual concert series and attracts well-known entertainers. Notable events and developments at Giant Center have included:

- October 15, 2002: Cher held the first concert at Giant Center during her Living Proof: The Farewell Tour, which sold 9,406 tickets.
- September 21, 2003: Giant Center held the WWE's Unforgiven.
- October 28, 2008: Giant Center hosted the Road to Victory rally for Republican presidential candidate John McCain and his running mate, Sarah Palin.
- November 23, 2009: WWE Raw was held at Giant Center with a three-hour Thanksgiving themed episode, and returned for a three-hour Old School–themed episode on November 15, 2010. WWE has also held several episodes of Raw and WWE SmackDown episodes at Giant Center.
- January 30 and January 31, 2011: Giant Center hosted the 2011 American Hockey League All-Star Game and Skills Competition.
- 2014: Giant Center hosted the Harrisburg Stampede of the Professional Indoor Football League.
- 2015: Elizabethtown College hosted the NCAA Division III Wrestling Championships at Giant Center.
- 2015: Prior to the 2015–16 Hershey Bears hockey season, Hershey Entertainment & Resorts made a $4.7 million upgrade to the production system, installing a new four-sided, center-hung HD scoreboard, a new LED standings board, and a new LED fascia ribbon surrounding the bowl, manufactured by Daktronics. The new scoreboard's video screens measure 13.52 feet high and 23.92 feet wide.
- October 1, 2016: Carrie Underwood appeared at Giant Center during her Storyteller Tour: Stories in the Round. The 360-degree angle of the stage stretched across the arena floor. She returned on June 13, 2019, during her Cry Pretty Tour 360.
- October 25, 2016: Giant Center hosted the Kellogg's Tour of Gymnastics Champions.
- November 4, 2016: President Donald Trump held a 2016 campaign rally at Giant Center, which set an all-time attendance record for the arena, attended by 12,500 inside the facility and thousands more who watched on screens from the arena's parking lot. On December 10, 2019, Trump returned to Giant Center for a campaign rally during the 2020 presidential campaign.
- December 28–31, 2023: Giant Center hosted Monster High Live.
- June 24, 2024: The Hershey Bears set a franchise attendance record of 11,013 fans in Game 6 of the 2024 Calder Cup Finals. The game went into overtime and the Bears won their 13th Calder Cup in franchise history.

=== Concerts ===
The arena has hosted a number of musical acts, including: Cher, Destiny's Child, Rush, Trans-Siberian Orchestra, Tim McGraw, ZZ Top, Rod Stewart, Lynyrd Skynyrd, TobyMac, Third Day, Green Day, New Found Glory, Newsboys, Michael W. Smith, Josh Groban, Kelly Clarkson, Elton John, Fall Out Boy, Michael Bublé, Hilary Duff, The Who, Taylor Swift, George Strait, Little Big Town, Brad Paisley, Keith Urban, Justin Moore, Van Halen, Brad Paisley, Delirious?, Eagles, Theory of a Deadman, Mötley Crüe, New Kids on the Block, Jason Aldean, Skillet, Goo Goo Dolls, Meat Loaf, Flo Rida, Korn, Royal Tailor, Tenth Avenue North, Miranda Lambert, Chris August, Carrie Underwood, Fifth Harmony, Selena Gomez, For King & Country, Casting Crowns, Avenged Sevenfold, MKTO, Demi Lovato, Randy Houser, Gaither Vocal Band, Thomas Rhett, Florida Georgia Line, Wiz Khalifa, Alice Cooper, Lady A, Earth, Wind & Fire, Chicago, Charlie Puth, Slipknot, Phil Wickham, Five Finger Death Punch, Unspoken, Danny Gokey, Volbeat, Foreigner, Cheap Trick, Chris Stapleton, Amy Grant, Bethel Music, Social Club Misfits, Matthew West, Natalie Grant, Zach Williams, Tesla, Styx, Why Don't We, Dan + Shay, Ryan Stevenson, Jordan Feliz, Aaron Cole, We Are Messengers, Jon McLaughlin, 2Cellos, Alan Jackson, Kidz Bop, Disturbed, Pentatonix, Post Malone, Swae Lee, James Taylor, Ghost, JoJo Siwa, Toto, Journey, Melanie Martinez, 5 Seconds of Summer, Rick Astley and Greta Van Fleet.

== Photos of the arena ==
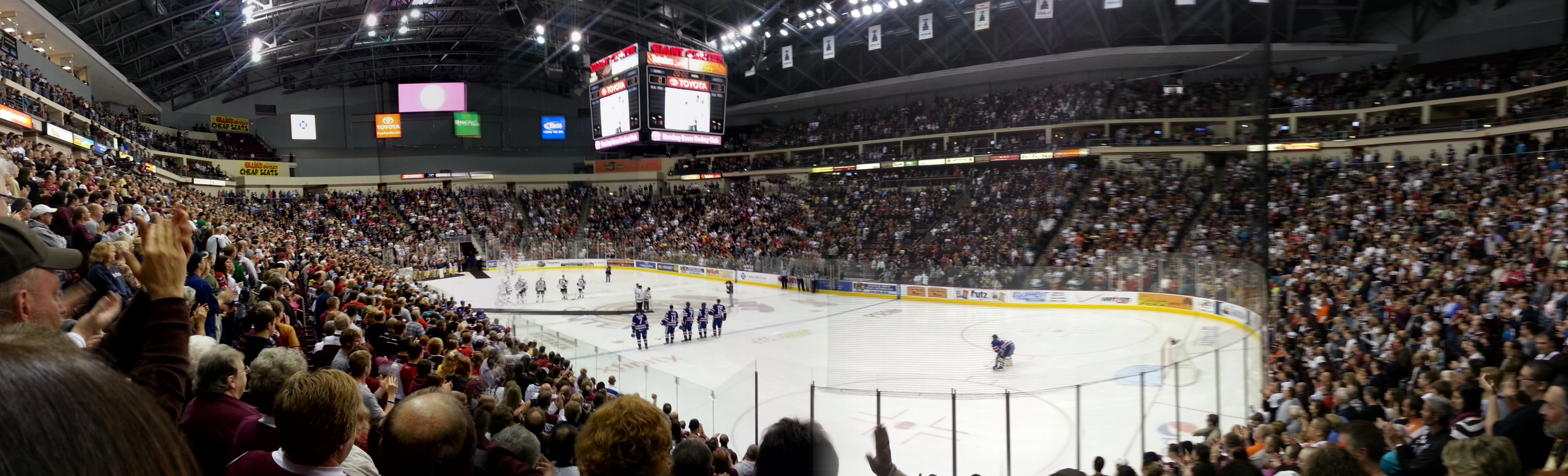
Panoramic view of Bears game

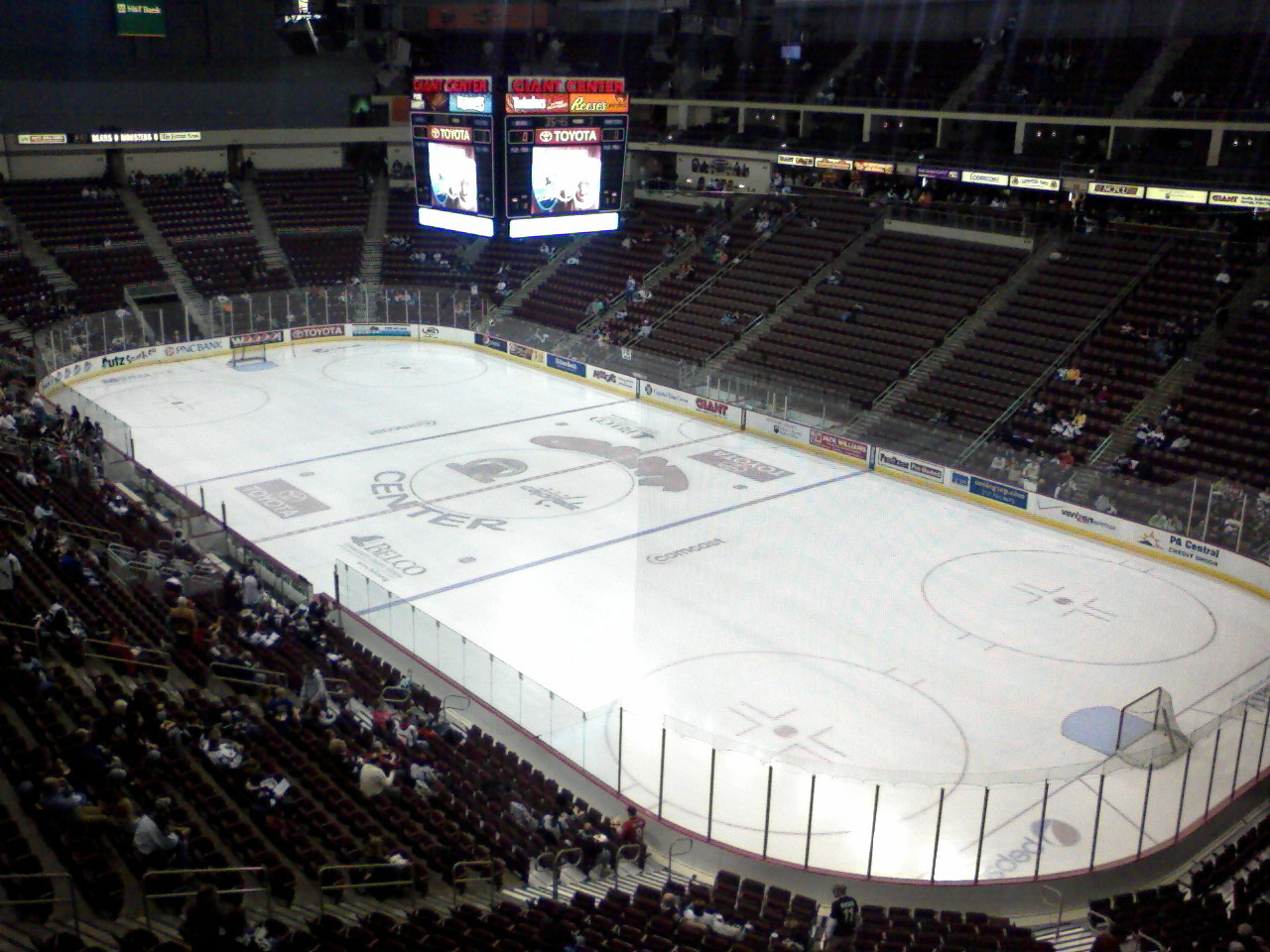
Giant Center before the start of a game against the Lake Erie Monsters

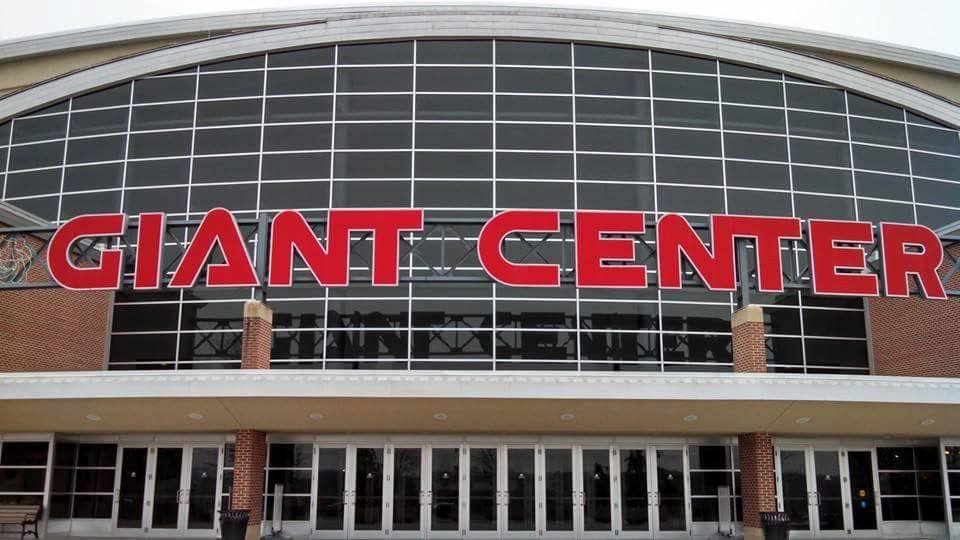
Front of Giant Center

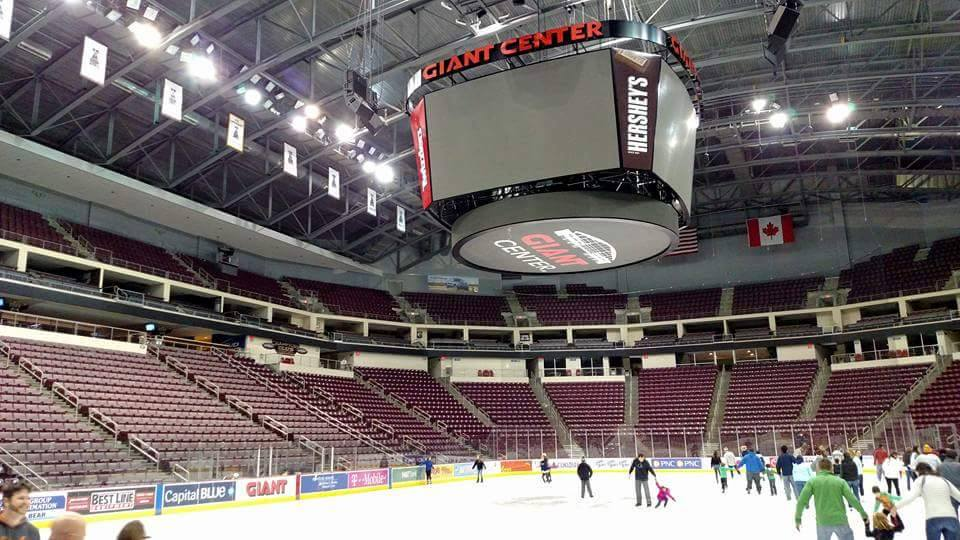
Inside Giant Center from the ice

| Preceded by Hersheypark Arena | Home of the Hershey Bears; 2002–present | Succeeded by current |
