= CURE Insurance Arena =

Arena in New Jersey, United States

Coordinates: 40°12′46″N 74°45′27.22″W

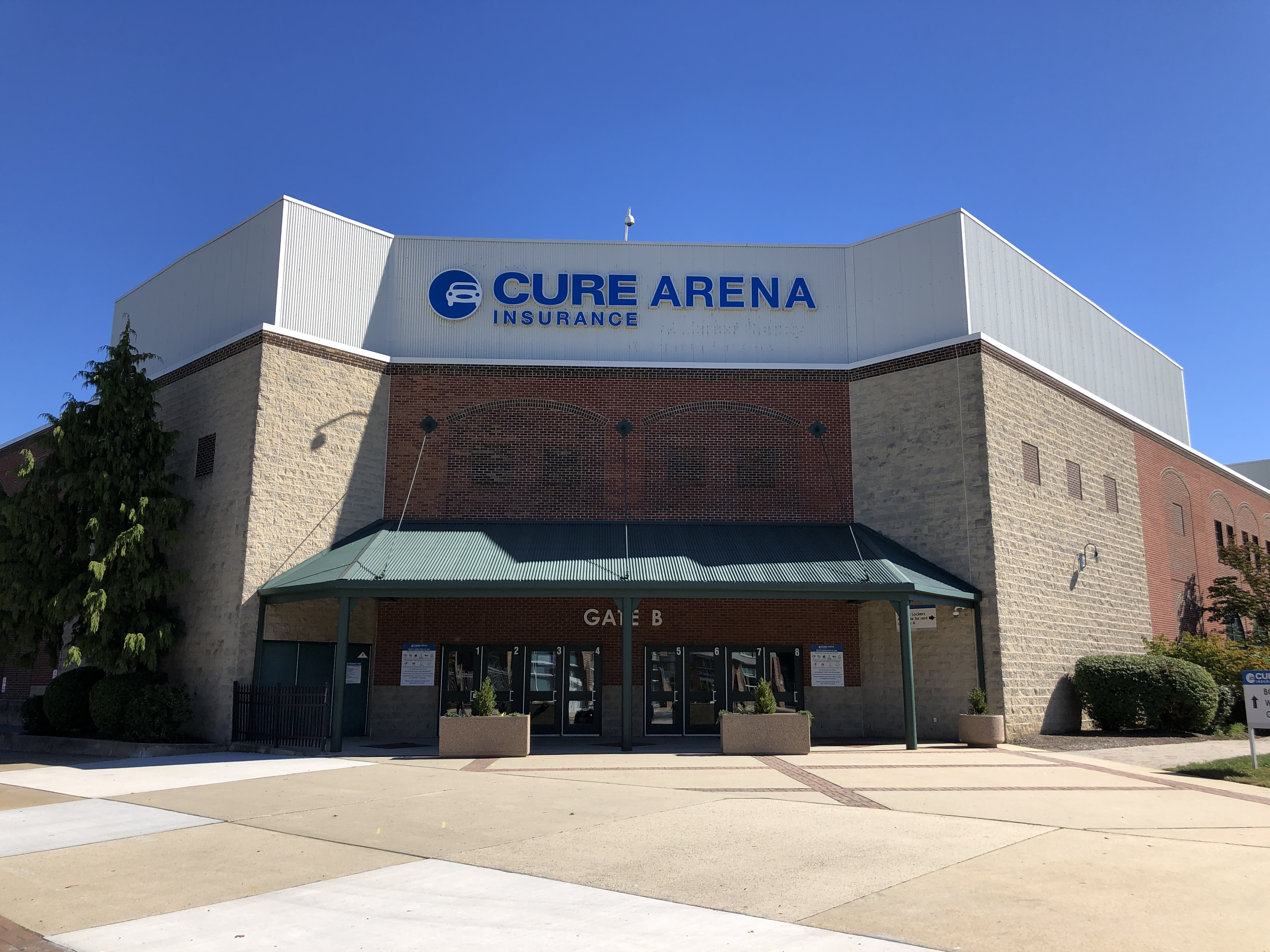
- Interactive map of CURE Insurance Arena
- Former names: Sovereign Bank Arena (1999–2009); Sun National Bank Center (2009–2017)
- Address: 81 Hamilton Avenue
- Location: Trenton, New Jersey, U.S.
- Owner: Mercer County Improvement Authority
- Operator: Oak View Group
- Capacity: Basketball: 8,600; Ice hockey: 7,605; Concerts: 10,500
- Public transit: River Line at Hamilton Avenue

Construction
- Groundbreaking: December 2, 1997
- Opened: October 6, 1999
- Cost: $53 million ($102 million in 2025 dollars)
- Architects: Sink Combs Dethlefs; Vitetta Group
- Structural engineer: Geiger Engineers
- Services engineers: French & Parrello Associates, P.A.
- General contractor: Gilbane Building Company

Tenants
- Trenton Titans/Devils (ECHL) (1999–2013); Trenton Shooting Stars (IBL) (1999–2001); Trenton Lightning (IPFL) (2001); Philadelphia Passion (LFL) (2009–2011); Trenton Steel (SIFL) (2011); Trenton Freedom (PIFL) (2014–2015); Jersey Flight (AAL/NAL) (2018–2021); TCNJ Lions (ACHA) (2021–2022); Trenton Terror (PBLA) (2022–2023); Trenton Ironhawks (ECHL) (2026–future)

Website
- cureinsurancearena.com

The CURE Insurance Arena is a multipurpose arena in Trenton, New Jersey. It hosts events including shows, sporting events and concerts.

The arena seats 7,605 for hockey and other ice events, 8,600 for basketball and up to 10,500 for concerts, family shows, and other events which makes it the largest arena in Central New Jersey. The arena is located next to, and served by, the Hamilton Avenue station on NJ Transit's River Line and New Jersey Route 129. It is managed by Oak View Group.

== History and events ==
The arena opened as Sovereign Bank Arena on October 6, 1999, with a World Wrestling Federation event. On November 13, 2009, Sun National Bank signed a naming-rights deal for seven years for $2.1 million. Since the arena opened, it has hosted over 3,500 events with over 7 million guests attending and has sold-out shows by Bruce Springsteen, World Wrestling Entertainment (WWE), Shania Twain, Keith Urban, Cher, Elton John, Ringling Bros. and Barnum & Bailey Circus, Britney Spears and Justin Bieber among others. Musical events have dwindled in the 2010s.

CURE Insurance Arena hosted the last regular season games of the premier 2018 JBA season.

=== Professional Box Lacrosse ===
The Trenton Terror of the Professional Box Lacrosse Association is part of the eight-team inaugural season. The Terror held their first game on December 30, 2022, against the New England Chowderheads, in which they lost 15–16 in overtime.

=== Men's basketball ===
The 2000 and 2001 Northeast Conference men's basketball tournaments were held there, as was the 2003 Metro Atlantic Athletic Conference men's basketball tournament.

The arena also hosted a game between Oak Hill Academy and Saint Vincent-Saint Mary High School, which featured a matchup between LeBron James and Carmelo Anthony. The game was broadcast nationally on ESPN.

=== Women's college basketball ===
In 2006, the arena hosted the first and second rounds of the NCAA Women's Division I Basketball Tournament. In 2009, the arena hosted the Trenton Regional of the NCAA Women's Division I Basketball Tournament where the University of Connecticut went to the Women's Final Four.

=== Men's club hockey ===
In 2021, The College of New Jersey's club ice hockey program announced it would play five home games at the arena during the 2021–22 season. Later on this increased with the non-varsity team using the arena as a home venue to finish the regular season. As defending conference champions, the Lions hosted the 2022 Colonial Cup Playoffs at the arena and reached the championship game before falling to the top seeded University of Pennsylvania. ECHL The Trenton Titans/ Devils played here from 1999-2013, when the franchise folded; in early 2026, however, it was announced that the league would return to Trenton, with the Utah Grizzlies moving to the city, initially, announced as being affiliated with the NHL's Colorado Avalanche, before that organization announced the New Mexico Goatheads as its new affiliate in the ECHL, reopening the possibility of either the New Jersey Devils/Philadelphia Flyers affiliating with the new team.

=== Professional wrestling ===
On August 10, 2008, the arena hosted Total Nonstop Action Wrestling's (TNA) 8th Hard Justice event.

On July 21, 2023, the arena hosted Ring of Honor's 20th Death Before Dishonor event.

=== College wrestling ===
On March 7–8, 2025, the arena hosted the 2025 MAC Wrestling Championships.

== See also ==
- List of indoor arenas in the United States
- List of New Jersey music venues by capacity

Events and tenants
Preceded by TNA Impact! Zone	Host of Hard Justice; 2008	Succeeded by TNA Impact! Zone
