= List of Professional Indoor Football League team rosters =

The following is a list of the final 2015 Professional Indoor Football League (PIFL) team rosters:
