= 2014 PIFL season =

2014 Professional Indoor Football League season
- League: Professional Indoor Football League
- Sport: Indoor American football
- Duration: March 29, 2013 – July 12, 2013
- Season MVP: Warren Smith (Trenton)

Playoffs
- American Conference champions: Nashville Venom
- American Conference runners-up: Columbus Lions
- National Conference champions: Lehigh Valley Steelhawks
- National Conference runners-up: Trenton Freedom

PIFL Cup III
- Champions: Nashville Venom
- Runners-up: Lehigh Valley Steelhawks
- Finals MVP: Charles McCullum (Nashville)

PIFL seasons
- ← 2013 2015 →

The 2014 Professional Indoor Football League season was the third season of the Professional Indoor Football League (PIFL). The regular season began March 29, 2014, and ended on June 28, 2014. Each team played a 12-game schedule. The top 2 teams in each conference advanced to the playoffs that began on July 5. The final was played July 12, with the Nashville Venom defeating the Lehigh Valley Steelhawks to win their first league championship.

== Pre-season ==
The Harrisburg Stampede joined the league, after playing two seasons in American Indoor Football. The Nashville Venom and the Trenton Freedom joined the league as expansion members. With complications surrounding the Albany Panthers franchise for the 2014 season, the Professional Indoor Football League (PIFL) introduced the Fire to replace the Panthers for the 2014 season. With the league running the team, PIFL Executive Director, Jeff Ganos was named the franchise's general manager and Cosmo DeMatteo was named the team's innaurgal head coach on February 27, 2014.

== Regular season ==
2014 Professional Indoor Football League
Team	Overall				Conference			
Team	W	L	T	PCT	W	L	T	PCT
National Conference
y-Trenton Freedom	8	4	0	.667	6	2	0	.750
x-Lehigh Valley Steelhawks	6	6	0	.500	5	3	0	.625
Richmond Raiders	5	7	0	.417	3	5	0	.375
Harrisburg Stampede	4	8	0	.333	2	6	0	.250
American Conference
y-Nashville Venom	10	2	0	.833	6	2	0	.750
x-Columbus Lions	7	5	0	.583	5	3	0	.625
Georgia Fire	4	8	0	.333	3	5	0	.375
Alabama Hammers	4	8	0	.333	2	6	0	.250

== Playoffs ==
Semifinals
1	Nashville	43
2	Columbus	39
1	Trenton	38
2	Lehigh Valley	49

Finals
A1	Nashville	64
N2	Lehigh Valley	43

== Awards ==
- Most Valuable Player - Warren Smith, Trenton Freedom
- Offensive Player of the Year - Phillip Barnett, Nashville Venom
- Defensive Player of the Year - Devin Jones, Richmond Raiders
- Offensive Rookie of the Year - Roger Jackson, Trenton Freedom
- Defensive Rookie of the Year - Devin Jones, Richmond Raiders
- Special Teams Player of the Year - Dwayne Hollis, Lehigh Valley Steelhawks
- Coach of the Year - Billy Back, Nashville Venom
