= 2012 Albany Panthers season =

- Owner: Rod Chappell
- General manager: Will Carter
- Head coach: Lucious Davis
- Home stadium: James H. Gray Civic Center

Results
- Record: 10-2
- League place: T-1st
- Playoffs: Won Semifinals (Columbus) 60-36; Won PIFL Cup I (Richmond)

The 2012 Albany Panthers season was the third season as a professional indoor football franchise and their first in the Professional Indoor Football League (PIFL).

The team played their home games under head coach Lucious Davis at the James H. Gray Civic Center in Albany, Georgia.

The Panthers finished their 2012 regular season at 10-2, with their two losses coming on the road and by a combined score of three points, clinching the #1 seed in the playoffs. They beat the Columbus Lions 60-36 in the first round, ensuring they would host their second straight championship game. The Panthers were quarterbacked by both Cecil Lester and Darnell Kennedy. On June 30, 2012, they won PIFL Cup I, 60-56, against the Richmond Raiders. The win gave the Panthers back-to-back Championships, while playing in two different leagues. The win also increased their home winning streak to eleven games.

== Schedule ==
Key: Win Tie Loss Bye

=== Regular season ===
All start times are local to home team

Week	Day	Date	Kickoff	Opponent	Results		Location	Attendance
Week	Day	Date	Kickoff	Opponent	Score	Record	Location	Attendance
1	BYE							
2	Saturday	March 17	7:30pm	Richmond Raiders	W 40-28	1-0	James H. Gray Civic Center	5,275
3	Saturday	March 24	7:00pm	at Louisiana Swashbucklers	W 58-55	2-0	Sudduth Coliseum	2,882
4	Saturday	March 31	7:30pm	Louisiana Swashbucklers	W 52-38	3-0	James H. Gray Civic Center	5,312
5	BYE							
6	Saturday	April 14	7:00pm	at Knoxville NightHawks	W 59-10	4-0	James White Civic Coliseum	1,420
7	Saturday	April 21	7:30pm	Columbus Lions	W 57-40	5-0	James H. Gray Civic Center	5,511
8	Saturday	April 28	7:30pm	Alabama Hammers	W 62-53	6-0	James H. Gray Civic Center	5,220
9	Sunday	May 6	4:00pm	at Columbus Lions	L 56-58	6-1	Columbus Civic Center	5,501
10	Saturday	May 12	7:30pm	Louisiana Swashbucklers	W 54-47	7-1	James H. Gray Civic Center	5,253
11	Saturday	May 19	6:00pm	at Alabama Hammers	W 59-40	8-1	Von Braun Center	2,552
12	BYE							
13	Saturday	June 2	7:30pm	Knoxville NightHawks	W 74-64	9-1	James H. Gray Civic Center	5,453
14	Saturday	June 9	7:30pm	at Columbus Lions	W 57-54	10-1	Columbus Civic Center	2,517
15	Saturday	June 16	7:00pm	at Richmond Raiders	L 66-67	10-2	3,735	Richmond Coliseum

=== Postseason ===
Round	Day	Date	Kickoff	Opponent	Results		Location	Attendance
Round	Day	Date	Kickoff	Opponent	Score	Record	Location	Attendance
Semifinals	Saturday	June 23	7:30pm	Columbus Lions	W 60-36	1-0	James H. Gray Civic Center	5,341
PIFL Cup I	Saturday	June 30	7:30pm	Richmond Raiders	W 60-56	2-0	James H. Gray Civic Center	6,194

== Roster ==
2012 Albany Panthers roster
Quarterbacks: 4 Darnell Kennedy; 7 Cecil Lester; Running backs: 2 Derrick Wimbush; Wide receivers: 8 Antwontis Cutts; 1 Clenton Rafe; 6 Antwone Savage	Offensive linemen: 52 Demetrius Jackson; 44 Terrance Smith; 70 Aaron Wheeler; Defensive linemen: 95 Anton Ceaser; 34 Chauncey DeBose; 22 Tito Hannah	Linebackers: 10 Ryan Babb; 31 Larry Edwards; Defensive backs: 5 Damian Daniels; 24 Kirderra Hall; 21 Corey Rue; Kickers *Geoffrey Boyer	Injured reserve: currently vacant; Exempt list: currently vacant; Practice squad: currently vacant; rookies in italics Roster updated July 1, 2013; 18 Active, 0 Inactive, 0 PS → More rosters

== Division Standings ==
2012 Professional Indoor Football League
Team	W	L	T	PCT	PF	PA	PF (Avg.)	PA (Avg.)	STK
y-Richmond Raiders	10	2	0	.833	722	589	61.2	49.1	W6
x-Albany Panthers	10	2	0	.833	694	554	57.8	46.2	L1
x-Columbus Lions	6	6	0	.500	720	713	60.0	59.4	W1
x-Louisiana Swashbucklers	6	6	0	.500	639	647	53.3	59.9	W1
Alabama Hammers	3	9	0	.250	642	683	53.5	56.9	L1
Knoxville NightHawks	1	11	0	.083	547	778	45.6	64.8	L5

Preceded by 2011	Albany Panthers seasons 2012	Succeeded by 2013
