= 2012 Richmond Raiders season =

American indoor football team season

- Owner: Mike & Elizabeth Fraizer
- Head coach: James Fuller
- Home stadium: Richmond Coliseum

Results
- Record: 10-2
- League place: T-1st
- Playoffs: Won Semifinals (Louisiana) 56-50; Lost PIFL Cup I (Albany) 56-60

The 2012 Richmond Raiders season was the third season as a professional indoor football franchise and their first in the newly formed Professional Indoor Football League (PIFL). One of 6 teams competing in the PIFL for the 2012 season.

The team played their home games under head coach James Fuller at the Richmond Coliseum in Richmond, Virginia. The Raiders earned a 10-2 record, placing tied for 1st in the league, qualifying for the playoffs. They were defeated in PIFL Cup I, 56-60 by the Albany Panthers.

== Schedule ==
Key: Win Tie Loss Bye

=== Regular season ===
All start times are local to home team

Week	Day	Date	Kickoff	Opponent	Results		Location	Attendance
Week	Day	Date	Kickoff	Opponent	Score	Record	Location	Attendance
1	Saturday	March 10	7:05pm	Columbus Lions	W 64-58	1-0	Richmond Coliseum	3,243
2	Saturday	March 17	7:30pm	at Albany Panthers	L 28-40	1–1	James H. Gray Civic Center	5,275
3	Saturday	March 24	7:05pm	Knoxville NightHawks	W 70-42	2–1	Richmond Coliseum	3,071
4	Saturday	March 31	7:00pm	at Knoxville NightHawks	W 80-29	3-1	James White Civic Coliseum	1,462
5	BYE							
6	Saturday	April 14	7:00pm	Alabama Hammers	W 62-44	4–1	Richmond Coliseum	2,912
7	Saturday	April 20	7:05pm	at Louisiana Swashbucklers	L 45-47	4-2	Sudduth Coliseum	1,952
8	BYE							
9	Saturday	May 5	7:20pm	Louisiana Swashbucklers	W 50-43	5-2	Richmond Coliseum	4,389
10	Saturday	May 11	7:05pm	at Alabama Hammers	W 65-59	6-2	Von Braun Center	2,054
11	Saturday	May 19	7:00pm	Columbus Lions	W 74-64	7-2	Richmond Coliseum	4,691
12	BYE							
13	Saturday	June 2	7:00pm	at Alabama Hammers	W 57-40	8-2	Von Braun Center	3,073
14	Saturday	June 9	7:00pm	at Knoxville NightHawks	W 60-57	9-2	James White Civic Coliseum	1,756
15	Saturday	June 16	7:00pm	Albany Panthers	W 67-66	10-2	Richmond Coliseum	3,735

=== Postseason ===
Round	Day	Date	Kickoff	Opponent	Results		Location	Attendance
Round	Day	Date	Kickoff	Opponent	Score	Record	Location	Attendance
Semifinals	Monday	June 25	7:00pm	Louisiana Swashbucklers	W 56-50	1-0	Richmond Coliseum	3,199
PIFL Cup I	Saturday	June 30	7:00pm	at Albany Panthers	L 56-60	1-1	James H. Gray Civic Center	6,194

== Roster ==
2012 Richmond Raiders roster
Quarterbacks: 10 James Steadman; 7 Antwon Young; Running backs: 22 [ordan Pavlisin; Wide receivers: 5 Herb Jones; 6 Jason Lovett; 3 Hakeem Moore; 1 Antwuan Williams	Offensive linemen: 55 Brandon Grier; 78 Kynneth Moses; 52 Derek Stoudt; Defensive linemen: 77 James Carter; 90 Brandon Sutto]; 63 Mik Woodhouse	Linebackers: 56 Preston Hines; 2 Brent Trice; Defensive backs: 11 RoShawn Marshall; 8 Pierre Lee; 31 Maurice Thorne; Kickers: 18 T. C. Stevens	Injured reserve: currently vacant; Exempt list: currently vacant; Practice squad: currently vacant; Roster updated June 30, 2012; 19 Active, 0 Inactive, 0 PS → More rosters

== Division Standings ==
2012 Professional Indoor Football League
Team	W	L	T	PCT	PF	PA	PF (Avg.)	PA (Avg.)	STK
y-Richmond Raiders	10	2	0	.833	722	589	61.2	49.1	W6
x-Albany Panthers	10	2	0	.833	694	554	57.8	46.2	L1
x-Columbus Lions	6	6	0	.500	720	713	60.0	59.4	W1
x-Louisiana Swashbucklers	6	6	0	.500	639	647	53.3	59.9	W1
Alabama Hammers	3	9	0	.250	642	683	53.5	56.9	L1
Knoxville NightHawks	1	11	0	.083	547	778	45.6	64.8	L5
