= 2012 Columbus Lions season =

- Owner: John Hargrove; Keith Norred; Kike Seda; Skip Seda; Rich Jacobson
- Head coach: Jason Gibson
- Home stadium: Columbus Civic Center

Results
- Record: 6–6
- League place: 3rd
- Playoffs: Lost Semifinals (Albany) 36–60

The 2012 Columbus Lions season was the sixth season for the professional indoor football franchise and their first in the Professional Indoor Football League (PIFL).

The team played their home games under head coach Jason Gibson at the Columbus Civic Center in Columbus, Georgia.

== Schedule ==
Key: Win Tie Loss Bye

=== Preseason ===
Date	Kickoff	Opponent	Result	Game Site	Recap
March 4	6:00 PM EST	Team James All-Stars	W 77–12	Columbus Civic Center	

=== Regular season ===
Week	Date	Kickoff	Opponent	Results		Game site	Recap
Week	Date	Kickoff	Opponent	Final	Record	Game site	Recap
1	March 10	7:30 PM EST	at Richmond Raiders	L 64–58	0–1	Richmond Coliseum	
2	March 17	7:30 PM EDT	Knoxville NightHawks	W 64–59	1–1	Columbus Civic Center	
3	March 24	7:30 PM EDT	at Alabama Hammers	W 56–43	2–1	Von Braun Center	
4	March 31	7:30 PM EDT	Alabama Hammers	L 63–60	2–2	Columbus Civic Center	
5	BYE						
6	April 14	7:30 PM EDT	Louisiana Swashbucklers	W 75–61	3–2	Columbus Civic Center	
7	April 21	7:30 PM EDT	at Albany Panthers	L 57–40	3–3	Albany Civic Center	
8	BYE						
9	May 6	4:00 PM EDT	Albany Panthers	W 58–56	4–3	Columbus Civic Center	
10	May 12	7:30 PM EDT	at Knoxville NightHawks	W 58–55	5–3	Knoxville Civic Auditorium and Coliseum	
11	May 19	7:30 PM EDT	at Richmond Raiders	L 74–64	5–4	Richmond Coliseum	
12	BYE						
13	June 2	7:30 PM EDT	at Louisiana Swashbucklers	L 61–57	5–5	Sudduth Coliseum	
14	June 9	7:30 PM EDT	Albany Panthers	L 57–54	5–6	Columbus Civic Center	
15	June 16	7:30 PM EDT	Knoxville NightHawks	W 76–63	6–6	Columbus Civic Center	

=== Postseason ===
Round	Date	Kickoff	Opponent	Result	Game site	Recap
Round 1	June 23	7:30 PM EDT	at Albany Panthers	L 60–36	Albany Civic Center	

== Roster ==
2012 Columbus Lions roster
Quarterbacks: 5 Randy Hippeard; Running backs: 77 Gabe Hollivay; Wide receivers: 4 London Crawford; 8 Maurice Dupree; 1 Gerald Gales; 2 Marcus Jones	Offensive linemen: 58 Dion Small; 72 Arthur Smith; 65 Issac Williams; Defensive linemen: 74 Franklin Lloyd; 50 Melvin Matthews; 92 Lawson Scott; 6 Armond Willis	Linebackers: 42 Matt Dunham; 51 Justen Rivers; Defensive backs: 3 Ramon Broadway; 23 Derek Douglas; 9 David Smith; 14 Cortez Stubbs; Kickers: 11 Trey Crum	Injured reserve: Currently vacant; Exempt list: Currently vacant; Practice squad: Currently vacant; Rookies in italics Roster updated June 23, 2013; 20 Active, 0 Inactive, 0 PS → More rosters

== Division standings ==
2012 Professional Indoor Football League
Team	W	L	T	PCT	PF	PA	PF (Avg.)	PA (Avg.)	STK
y-Richmond Raiders	10	2	0	.833	722	589	61.2	49.1	W6
x-Albany Panthers	10	2	0	.833	694	554	57.8	46.2	L1
x-Columbus Lions	6	6	0	.500	720	713	60.0	59.4	W1
x-Louisiana Swashbucklers	6	6	0	.500	639	647	53.3	59.9	W1
Alabama Hammers	3	9	0	.250	642	683	53.5	56.9	L1
Knoxville NightHawks	1	11	0	.083	547	778	45.6	64.8	L5
