= 2012 Knoxville NightHawks season =

- Owner: Jeff Knight
- Head coach: Chris MacKeown
- Home stadium: James White Civic Coliseum

Results
- Record: 1–11
- League place: 6th
- Playoffs: Did not qualify

The 2013 Knoxville NightHawks season was the first season for the professional indoor football franchise and their first in the Professional Indoor Football League (PIFL). The NightHawks were one of six teams that competed in the PIFL for the 2013 season.

The team played their home games under head coach Chris MacKeown at the James White Civic Coliseum in Knoxville, Tennessee. The NightHawks earned a 1–11 record, placing seventh in the league, failing to qualify for the playoffs.

The franchise was announced by Owner Jeff Knight on September 15, 2011. He announced the team's decision to join the Professional Indoor Football League and that the team would play at the James White Civic Coliseum. On October 4, 2011, the NightHawks named Chris MacKeown the team's first coach in franchise history. The team made a splash when they signed veteran NFL defensive lineman Chris Bradwell, and veteran Arena Football League quarterback, Tony Colston. In the team's first ever game, the NightHawks fell 45–70 to the Alabama Hammers. The team started 0–6 on the season before winning their 7th contest on May 5, 2012, an overtime victory over the Hammers. The team finished their inaugural season 1–11 with a 0.083 winning percentage, which was worst in the PIFL. Coach MacKeown said he felt that he would not be back for a second season with the team.

== Schedule ==
Key: Win Tie Loss Bye

=== Regular season ===
All start times are local to home team

Week	Day	Date	Kickoff	Opponent	Results		Location
Week	Day	Date	Kickoff	Opponent	Score	Record	Location
1	BYE						
2	Saturday	March 17	7:30pm	at Columbus Lions	L 59–64	0–1	Columbus Civic Center
3	Saturday	March 24	7:00pm	at Richmond Raiders	L 42–70	0–2	Richmond Coliseum
4	Saturday	March 31	7:00pm	Richmond Raiders	L 29–80	0–3	James White Civic Coliseum
5	BYE						
6	Saturday	April 14	7:00pm	Albany Panthers	L 10–59	0–4	James White Civic Coliseum
7	Saturday	April 21	7:05pm	at Alabama Hammers	L 25–62	0–5	Von Braun Center
8	Friday	April 27	7:00pm	Louisiana Swashbucklers	L 28–61	0–6	James White Civic Coliseum
9	Saturday	May 5	7:00pm	Alabama Hammers	W 64–61 OT	1–6	James White Civic Coliseum
10	Saturday	May 12	7:00pm	Columbus Lions	L 55–58	1–7	James White Civic Coliseum
11	Saturday	May 19	7:05pm	at Louisiana Swashbucklers	L 51–53	1–8	Sudduth Coliseum
12	BYE						
13	Saturday	June 2	7:00pm	at Albany Panthers	L 64–74	1–9	James H. Gray Civic Center
14	Saturday	June 9	7:00pm	Richmond Raiders	L 57–60	1–10	James White Civic Coliseum
15	Saturday	June 16	7:00pm	at Columbus Lions	L 63–76	1–11	Columbus Civic Center

== Roster ==
2012 Knoxville NightHawks roster
Quarterbacks: 12 Russell Hill; Running backs: 38 Glenn Revell; 23 Kelvin Thompson; Wide receivers: 4 Justin Craig; 14 Ryan McDaniel; 20 Ryan Schuck	Offensive linemen: 77 Chris Oliver; 72 Chance Talbert; Defensive linemen: 91 Xavier Mitchell	Linebackers: 22 Cassen Jackson-Garrison; Defensive backs: 21 Greg Harvey; 3 Ginikach Ibe; 1 Anthony Shutt; Kickers: 10 Alex Walls	Injured reserve: -- Jeremy Buchanan OL; Exempt list: Currently vacant; Rookies in italics updated June 23, 2012; 14 Active, 1 Inactive

== Division standings ==
2012 Professional Indoor Football League
Team	W	L	T	PCT	PF	PA	PF (Avg.)	PA (Avg.)	STK
y-Richmond Raiders	10	2	0	.833	722	589	61.2	49.1	W6
x-Albany Panthers	10	2	0	.833	694	554	57.8	46.2	L1
x-Columbus Lions	6	6	0	.500	720	713	60.0	59.4	W1
x-Louisiana Swashbucklers	6	6	0	.500	639	647	53.3	59.9	W1
Alabama Hammers	3	9	0	.250	642	683	53.5	56.9	L1
Knoxville NightHawks	1	11	0	.083	547	778	45.6	64.8	L5
