= 2012 Louisiana Swashbucklers season =

- Owner: Chris Meaux
- Head coach: Darnell Lee
- Home stadium: Sudduth Coliseum

Results
- Record: 6–6
- League place: 4th
- Playoffs: Lost Semifinals (Richmond) 50–56

The 2012 Louisiana Swashbucklers season was the eighth season as a professional indoor football franchise and their first in the Professional Indoor Football League (PIFL).

The team played their home games under head coach Darnell Lee at the Sudduth Coliseum in Lake Charles, Louisiana.

== Schedule ==
Key: Win Tie Loss Bye

=== Regular season ===
All start times are local to home team

| Week | Day | Date | Kickoff | Opponent | Results | | Location |
| Week | Day | Date | Kickoff | Opponent | Score | Record | Location |
|---|---|---|---|---|---|---|---|
| 1 | BYE | | | | | | |
| 2 | Saturday | March 17 | 7:05pm | Alabama Hammers | W 56–49 | 1–0 | Sudduth Coliseum |
| 3 | Saturday | March 24 | 7:00pm | Albany Panthers | L 55–58 | 1–1 | Sudduth Coliseum |
| 4 | Saturday | March 31 | 7:30pm | at Albany Panthers | L 38–52 | 1–2 | James H. Gray Civic Center |
| 5 | BYE | | | | | | |
| 6 | Saturday | April 14 | 7:00pm | at Columbus Lions | L 61–75 | 1–3 | Columbus Civic Center |
| 7 | Saturday | April 21 | 7:00pm | Richmond Raiders | W 47–45 | 2–3 | Sudduth Coliseum |
| 8 | Friday | April 27 | 7:00pm | at Knoxville NightHawks | W 61–28 | 3–3 | James White Civic Coliseum |
| 9 | Saturday | May 5 | 7:20pm | at Richmond Raiders | L 43–50 | 3–4 | Richmond Coliseum |
| 10 | Saturday | May 12 | 7:30pm | at Albany Panthers | L 47–54 | 3–5 | James H. Gray Civic Center |
| 11 | Saturday | May 19 | 7:00pm | Knoxville NightHawks | W 53–51 | 4–5 | Sudduth Coliseum |
| 12 | BYE | | | | | | |
| 13 | Saturday | June 2 | 7:00pm | Columbus Lions | W 61–57 | 5–5 | Sudduth Coliseum |
| 14 | Saturday | June 9 | 7:00pm | at Alabama Hammers | L 42–58 | 5–6 | Von Braun Center |
| 15 | Saturday | June 16 | 7:05pm | Alabama Hammers | W 75–70 | 6–6 | Sudduth Coliseum |

=== Postseason ===
| Round | Day | Date | Kickoff | Opponent | Results | | Location |
| Round | Day | Date | Kickoff | Opponent | Score | Record | Location |
|---|---|---|---|---|---|---|---|
| Semifinals | Saturday | June 23 | 7:30pm | at Richmond Raiders | L 50–56 | 0–1 | Richmond Coliseum |

== Roster ==
2012 Louisiana Swashbucklers roster
| Quarterbacks: 14 Alvin Bartie; 4 Chris Mayabb; Running backs: 23 Kendrick Perry; Wide receivers: 19 Immanuel Friddle; 17 Sammy Knight; 6 Jordan Rideaux | Offensive linemen: 58 Will Pritchett; 77 Roman Pritt; Defensive linemen: 56 John Paul Jones; 21 Bryant Mason; 11 Malcolm Tatum | Linebackers: 20 Tray Blackmon; 5 Ellis Mead; Defensive backs: 1 Damian Huren; 18 Eric Jackson; 28 Kenny Kitchen; 10 B. J. Thomas; Kickers: 13 Blake Bercegeay | Injured reserve: Currently vacant; Exempt list: Currently vacant; Practice squad: Currently vacant; Rookies in italics Roster updated June 25, 2012; 18 Active, 0 Inactive, 0 PS |

== Division standings ==
2012 Professional Indoor Football League
| Team | W | L | T | PCT | PF | PA | PF (Avg.) | PA (Avg.) | STK |
|---|---|---|---|---|---|---|---|---|---|
| y-Richmond Raiders | 10 | 2 | 0 | .833 | 722 | 589 | 61.2 | 49.1 | W6 |
| x-Albany Panthers | 10 | 2 | 0 | .833 | 694 | 554 | 57.8 | 46.2 | L1 |
| x-Columbus Lions | 6 | 6 | 0 | .500 | 720 | 713 | 60.0 | 59.4 | W1 |
| x-Louisiana Swashbucklers | 6 | 6 | 0 | .500 | 639 | 647 | 53.3 | 59.9 | W1 |
| Alabama Hammers | 3 | 9 | 0 | .250 | 642 | 683 | 53.5 | 56.9 | L1 |
| Knoxville NightHawks | 1 | 11 | 0 | .083 | 547 | 778 | 45.6 | 64.8 | L5 |
