= 2012 Alabama Hammers season =

- Owner: Jeff Knight
- Head coach: Marty Hammond
- Home stadium: Von Braun Center

Results
- Record: 3–9
- League place: 5th
- Playoffs: Did not qualify

The 2012 Alabama Hammers season was the second season for the professional indoor football franchise and their first in the Professional Indoor Football League (PIFL).

The team played their home games under head coach Marty Hammond at the Von Braun Center in Huntsville, Alabama. The Hammers finished 3–9, failing to qualify for the playoffs.

== Schedule ==
Key: Win Tie Loss Bye

=== Regular season ===
All start times are local to home team

Week	Day	Date	Kickoff	Opponent	Results		Location
Week	Day	Date	Kickoff	Opponent	Score	Record	Location
1	BYE						
2	Saturday	March 17	7:05pm	Louisiana Swashbucklers	L 49–56	0–1	Sudduth Coliseum
3	Saturday	March 24	7:00pm	Columbus Lions	L 43–56	0–2	Von Braun Center
4	Saturday	March 31	7:30pm	at Columbus Lions	W 63–60	1–2	Columbus Civic Center
5	BYE						
6	Saturday	April 14	7:00pm	at Richmond Raiders	L 44–62	1–3	Richmond Coliseum
7	Saturday	April 21	7:00pm	Knoxville NightHawks	W 62–25	2–3	Von Braun Center
8	Saturday	April 28	7:30pm	at Albany Panthers	L 53–62	2–4	James H. Gray Civic Center
9	Saturday	May 5	7:00pm	at Knoxville NightHawks	L 61–64 OT	2–5	James White Civic Coliseum
10	Friday	May 11	7:00pm	Richmond Raiders	L 56–65	2–6	Von Braun Center
11	Saturday	May 19	7:00pm	Albany Panthers	L 40–59	2–7	Von Braun Center
12	BYE						
13	Saturday	June 2	7:00pm	Richmond Raiders	L 40–57	2–8	Von Braun Center
14	Saturday	June 9	7:00pm	Louisiana Swashbucklers	W 58–42	3–8	Von Braun Center
15	Saturday	June 16	7:05pm	at Louisiana Swashbucklers	L 70–75	3–9	Sudduth Coliseum

== Roster ==
2012 Alabama Hammers roster
Quarterbacks: 10 Arvell Nelson; Running backs: 44 Kenneth Williams; Wide receivers: 6 Thomas Harris; 3 Charles McClain; 4 Mico McSwain	Offensive linemen: 99 Anquez Jackson; 72 Darius Turner; Defensive linemen: 91 Jason Gaines; 14 Benji McDowell; 95 Irving McGuire; 22 Gary Pack; 9 Eric Scott	Linebackers: 42 Kem Oti; 5 Darian Payne; Defensive backs: 2 Marvin Bohannon; 21 Al Donaldson; 19 Anthony Hale; 20 Tremayne Townsend; Kickers: 16 Jamie Whitworth	Injured reserve: Currently vacant; Exempt list: Currently vacant; Practice squad: Currently vacant; Rookies in italics Roster updated June 16, 2012; 19 Active, 0 Inactive, 0 PS → More rosters

== Division standings ==
2012 Professional Indoor Football League
Team	W	L	T	PCT	PF	PA	PF (Avg.)	PA (Avg.)	STK
y-Richmond Raiders	10	2	0	.833	722	589	61.2	49.1	W6
x-Albany Panthers	10	2	0	.833	694	554	57.8	46.2	L1
x-Columbus Lions	6	6	0	.500	720	713	60.0	59.4	W1
x-Louisiana Swashbucklers	6	6	0	.500	639	647	53.3	59.9	W1
Alabama Hammers	3	9	0	.250	642	683	53.5	56.9	L1
Knoxville NightHawks	1	11	0	.083	547	778	45.6	64.8	L5
