= Larry Edwards (American football) =

American football player (born 1984)

No. 31 – Columbus Lions
- Position: Linebacker
- Roster status: Active

Personal information
- Born: November 4, 1984 (age 42); Tampa, Florida, U.S.
- Listed height: 6 ft 2 in (1.88 m)
- Listed weight: 260 lb (118 kg)

Career information
- High school: Wharton (Tampa)
- College: North Carolina
- NFL draft: 2007: undrafted

Career history
- Buffalo Bills (2007)*; St. Louis Rams (2007)*; Florida Firecats (2009); Jacksonville Sharks (2010)*; Columbus Lions (2010); Albany Panthers (2010–2013); Georgia Fire (2014); Columbus Lions (2015–2016); Georgia Firebirds (2017); Columbus Lions (2017–present)
- * Offseason or practice squad member only

Awards and highlights
- SIFL champion (2011); First-team All-PIFL (2012); 2× PIFL champion (2012, 2015); Second-team All-PIFL (2015); AIF champion (2016); Second-team All-NAL (2017)
- Stats at ArenaFan.com

Larry Edwards (born November 4, 1984) is an American professional football linebacker for the Columbus Lions of the National Arena League (NAL). He was signed by the Bills as an undrafted free agent in 2007. He played college football for the North Carolina Tar Heels.

== Professional career ==
=== Buffalo Bills ===
Edwards was signed as an undrafted free agent by the Buffalo Bills following the 2007 NFL draft.

=== Albany Panthers ===
Edwards has played with the Albany Panthers since their expansion season in 2010. Edwards was a First-team All-PIFL selection in 2012. Edwards has re-signed with the Panthers for the 2014 season.

=== Georgia Fire ===
Edwards played for the Georgia Fire in 2014, a team that was created by the PIFL to replace the Panthers who folded prior to the start of the season.

=== Columbus Lions ===
Edwards joined the Columbus Lions for the 2015 season, and the Lions obtained the best record in the PIFL, earning a berth in PIFL Cup IV. Edwards was named Second-team All-PIFL. The Lions won the PIFL Championship 64–38 over the Richmond Raiders.

=== Georgia Firebirds ===
On December 8, 2016, Edwards signed with the Georgia Firebirds.

=== Columbus Lions ===
On April 25, 2017, Edwards was traded to the Columbus Lions.
