= Cortez Stubbs =

American football player (born 1988)

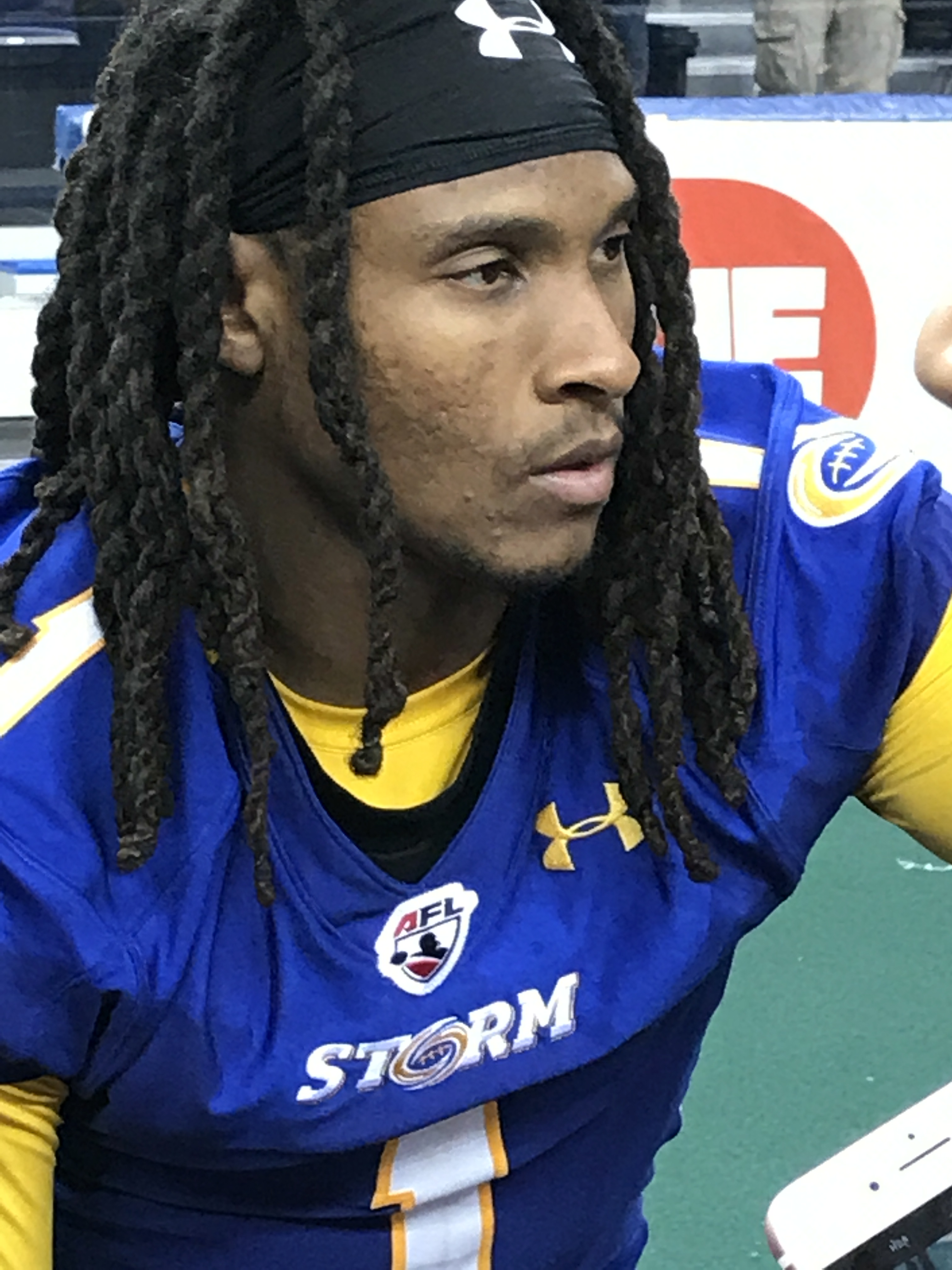
- Stubbs in 2017

Profile
- Position: Defensive back

Personal information
- Born: August 16, 1988 (age 38); Birmingham, Alabama
- Listed height: 5 ft 9 in (1.75 m)
- Listed weight: 180 lb (82 kg)

Career information
- High school: Birmingham (AL) Huffman
- College: Concordia College Alabama
- NFL draft: 2011: undrafted

Career history
- Columbus Lions (2012); Jacksonville Sharks (2012); Knoxville NightHawks (2013); Alabama Hammers (2013); Orlando Predators (2013–2014); New Orleans VooDoo (2015); Tampa Bay Storm (2016–2017)

Awards and highlights
- Second Team All-PIFL (2012)

Career AFL statistics
- Tackles: 220
- Pass breakups: 32
- Interceptions: 9
- Stats at ArenaFan.com

Cortez Stubbs (born August 16, 1988) is an American football defensive back who is currently a free agent. He played college football at the Concordia College Alabama and attended Huffman High School in Birmingham, Alabama. Stubbs has been a member of the Columbus Lions, Jacksonville Sharks, Alabama Hammers, Orlando Predators, New Orleans VooDoo and Tampa Bay Storm.

== Early life ==
Stubbs played football at Huffman High School.

== College career ==
Stubbs played for the Concordia College Hornets from 2007 to 2010. He was a starter his final two season.

== Professional career ==
=== Columbus Lions ===
Stubbs played in 2012 with the Columbus Lions of the Professional Indoor Football League. Stubbs performed well enough that he was named Second Team All-PIFL.

=== Jacksonville Sharks ===
On December 5, 2012, Stubbs was assigned to the Jacksonville Sharks. On March 16, 2013, Stubbs was placed on reassignment.

=== Knoxville NightHawks ===
Upon Stubbs' reassignment by the Sharks, the Lions traded him to the Knoxville NightHawks for future considerations.

=== Alabama Hammers ===
Stubbs was traded to the Alabama Hammers. Stubbs helped the Hammers win PIFL Cup II.

=== Orlando Predators ===
Stubbs was assigned to the Orlando Predators to final the 2013 season. The Predators picked up Stubbs' rookie option for 2014.

=== New Orleans VooDoo ===
Stubbs was assigned to the New Orleans VooDoo for the 2015 season.

=== Tampa Bay Storm ===
On January 14, 2016, Stubbs was assigned to the Tampa Bay Storm. The Storm folded in December 2017.
