= T. C. Stevens =

American football player (born 1987)

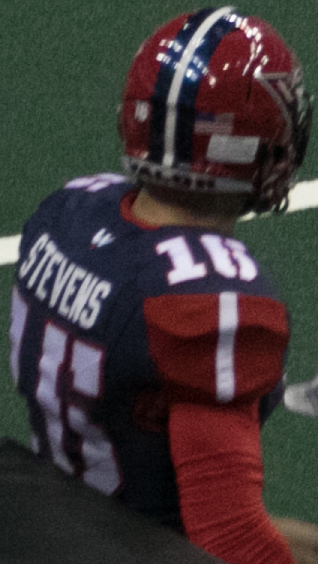
- Stevens with the Washington Valor in 2017

No. 16, 18, 22
- Position: Kicker

Personal information
- Born: March 8, 1987 (age 39)
- Listed height: 5 ft 11 in (1.80 m)
- Listed weight: 190 lb (86 kg)

Career information
- High school: Halifax County (South Boston, Virginia)
- College: Hampden–Sydney
- NFL draft: 2009: undrafted

Career history
- Rio Grande Valley Dorados (2009); Richmond Raiders (2012–2015); New Orleans VooDoo (2015); Triangle Torch (2016); Washington Valor (2017); Richmond Roughriders (2018); Baltimore Brigade (2019); Carolina Cobras (2021)

Awards and highlights
- NAL Special Teams Player of the Year (2021); First-team All-NAL (2021); 2× PIFL Special Teams Player of the Year (2012, 2015); 3× First-team All-PIFL (2012, 2014, 2015); Second-team All-ODAC (2006)

Career AFL statistics
- FG made: 3
- FG att: 6
- PAT made: 65
- PAT att: 79
- Tackles: 2.5
- Stats at ArenaFan.com

Tony C. Stevens (born March 8, 1987) is an American former professional football kicker. He played college football for the Hampden–Sydney Tigers. He was a member of the Rio Grande Valley Dorados, Richmond Raiders, New Orleans VooDoo, Triangle Torch, Washington Valor, Richmond Roughriders, Baltimore Brigade, and Carolina Cobras.

== Early life ==
Stevens attended Halifax County High School in South Boston, Virginia.

== College career ==
Stevens played for the Tigers at Hampden–Sydney College from 2005 to 2009. He was the team's starter his final all four years at punter and his final two at kicker and helped the Tigers to 29 wins. Stevens was named Second Team All-Old Dominion Athletic Conference as a punter in 2006.

=== Statistics ===
Year	Team	Kicking					Punting		
Year	Team	Made FG	Att FG	Pct	Long	Pts	Att	Avg	Long
2005	Hampden–Sydney	0	0	--	-	0	17	34.4	57
2006	Hampden–Sydney	0	2	0.0	0	1	27	38.1	53
2007	Hampden–Sydney	5	10	50.0	42	56	40	39.5	54
2008	Hampden–Sydney	6	9	66.7	35	54	31	35.1	58
Career		11	21	52.4	42	78	115	36.8	58

== Professional career ==
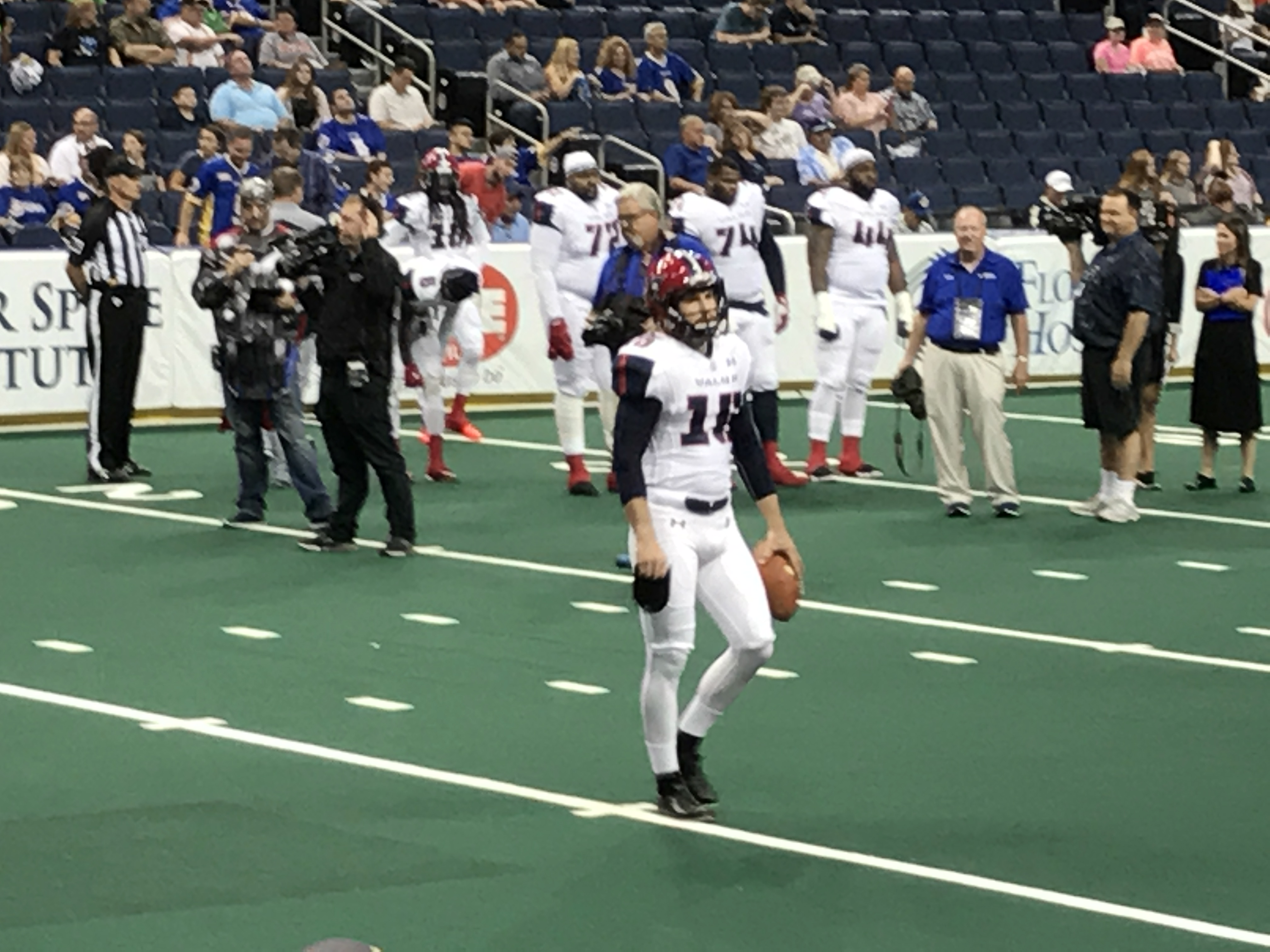
Stevens in 2017

Stevens signed with the Rio Grande Valley Dorados of the af2 for the 2009 season, where he would battle against Rubio Radamez for the teams kicking duties. Stevens beat out Radamez for the starting kicking duties, but was later replaced midseason by Radamez.

Stevens signed with the Richmond Raiders of the Professional Indoor Football League (PIFL). Stevens helped the Raiders clinch the top seed in the PIFL with a last second field goal to knock off the Albany Panthers on June 16, 2012. Following the 2012 season, Stevens was named the 2012 PIFL Special Teams Player of the Year. Stevens would go on to make First Team All-PIFL 3 times during his 4-year stint with the Raiders. Stevens added a second Special Teams Player of the Year award following the 2015 season.

Stevens was assigned to the New Orleans VooDoo of the Arena Football League (AFL) to replace an injured Brian Jackson. Stevens was 1 of 3 on field goal attempts and 15 of 18 on extra point attempts.

Stevens signed with the Triangle Torch of American Indoor Football in 2016.

On April 5, 2017, Stevens was assigned to the AFL's Washington Valor. On May 31, 2017, Stevens was placed on reassignment. On June 21, 2017, Stevens was assigned to the Valor once again. On June 29, 2017, Stevens was placed on reassignment. On July 13, 2017, Stevens was assigned to the Valor once again.

In 2018, Stevens returned to Richmond by signing with the Richmond Roughriders of the American Arena League. Stevens started off the season by making four out of five extra point attempts versus the High County Grizzlies.

On May 16, 2019, Stevens was assigned to the Baltimore Brigade of the AFL.
