= Jonathan Bane =

American football player (born 1991)

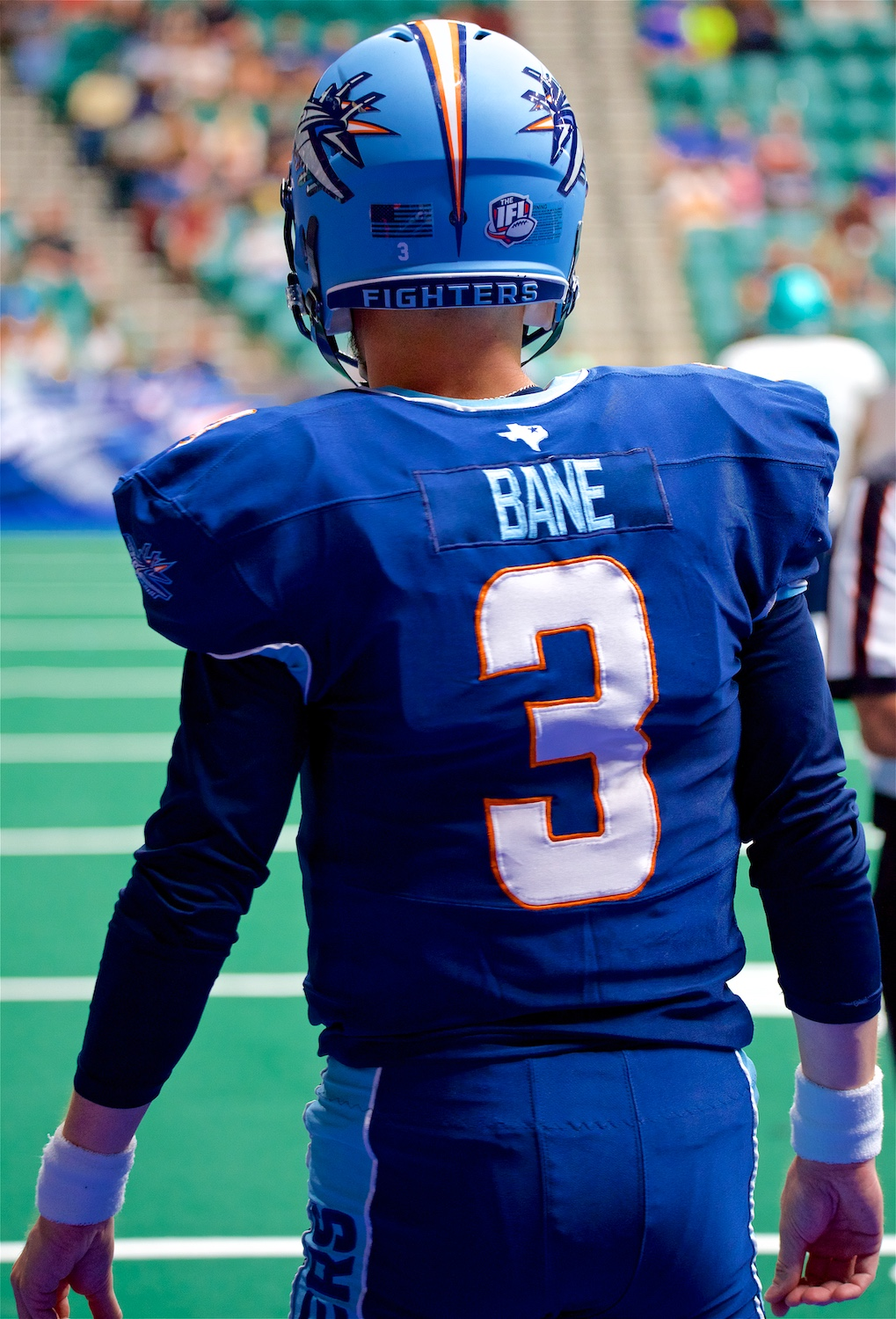
- Bane with the Frisco Fighters in 2021

No. 3, 6
- Position: Quarterback

Personal information
- Born: September 4, 1991 (age 35); Temple, Texas, U.S.
- Listed height: 6 ft 3 in (1.91 m)
- Listed weight: 205 lb (93 kg)

Career information
- High school: Temple
- College: Dakota Wesleyan
- NFL draft: 2014: undrafted

Career history

Playing
- Richmond Raiders (2014–2015); Bloomington Edge (2016)*; Tampa Bay Storm (2016); Colorado Crush (2017)*; Bismarck Bucks (2017); High Country Grizzlies (2018)*; Maine Mammoths (2018); Jacksonville Sharks (2019); Frisco Fighters (2020–2021); Carolina Cobras (2022); San Antonio Gunslingers (2023)*; Iowa Barnstormers (2023); Albany Empire (2023); Orlando Predators (2023); West Texas Desert Hawks (2024)
- * Offseason or practice squad member only

Coaching
- San Antonio Gunslingers (2025) Quarterbacks coach and special teams coordinator; San Antonio Gunslingers (2026–present) Head coach

Awards and highlights
- NAL champion (2019); PIFL Offensive Player of the Year (2015); First-team All-PIFL (2015); Second-team All-GPAC (2011)

Career AFL statistics
- Comp. / Att.: 46 / 97
- Passing yards: 526
- TD–INT: 8–4
- QB rating: 67.63
- Stats at ArenaFan.com

Jonathan Bane (born September 4, 1991) is an American former professional football quarterback. He is the head coach for the San Antonio Gunslingers of the Indoor Football League (IFL). He played college football at Dakota Wesleyan.

== Early life ==
Bane first played high school football for the Rogers High School Eagles of Rogers, Texas before transferring to play for the Temple High School Wildcats of Temple, Texas. He left Rogers his junior year due to a disagreement due to a disagreement between the head football coach and athletic director over the treatment of Eagles players. He was ruled ineligible for varsity sports for a year by the University Interscholastic League. Bane then played on Temple's junior varsity team and did not appear in any varsity games until the final contest of his senior season and an ensuing playoff game. He then signed to play football at Trinity Valley Community College. He was in a car crash his senior year that severely hampered his ability to walk. Bane was not in college his first year out of high school.

== College career ==
Bane played for the Dakota Wesleyan Tigers of Dakota Wesleyan University from 2010 to 2013. He threw for 1,920 yards and 12 touchdowns in 2010, 2,817 yards and 28 touchdowns in 2011, 2,157 yards and 18 touchdowns in 2012 and 2,330 yards and 25 touchdowns in 2013. He completed 744 of 1,360 passes for 83 touchdowns and a school record 9,224 yards during his college career. Bane set school records for passing yards in a game with 457, longest pass in a game with 99 yards and most passing yards in a season with 2,817. He also earned second-team All-GPAC honors in 2011 and honorable mention All-GPAC accolades in 2012 and 2013.

== Professional career ==
Bane signed with the Richmond Raiders of the Professional Indoor Football League (PIFL) in May 2014 and played for the team from 2014 to 2015. He was named the PIFL Offensive Player of the Year in 2015 after completing 221 passes for 2,759 yards and 55 touchdowns. He also garnered First Team All-PIFL accolades. Bane helped the Raiders advance to the PIFL championship game in 2015, where they lost to the Columbus Lions.

Bane was signed by the Bloomington Edge of Champions Indoor Football (CIF) in October 2015. He was later selected in the 2016 Major League Football Draft.

Bane was assigned to the Tampa Bay Storm of the Arena Football League (AFL) on February 22, 2016. He made his AFL debut on April 1, 2016, against the Orlando Predators in relief of starter Adam Kennedy, completing five of eight passes for 65 yards with a touchdown and an interception. He made his first career AFL start on May 1, 2016, completing 21 of 38 passes for 281 yards and three touchdowns in a 33–27 loss to the Jacksonville Sharks. On May 12, 2016, Bane was placed on recallable reassignment.

On November 14, 2016, Bane signed with the Colorado Crush of the Indoor Football League (IFL). Bane was released by the Crush on January 30, 2017.

On February 21, 2017, Bane was signed by the Bismarck Bucks of the CIF. He played in seven games for the Bucks, completing 116 of 210 passes for 1,342 yards, 28 touchdowns and 5 interceptions. He also scored three rushing touchdowns. He was placed on injured reserve on May 17, 2017.

Originally, Bane had signed with the High Country Grizzlies of the American Arena League (AAL) in October 2017. However, on December 5, 2017, he was announced as the inaugural player signing for the Maine Mammoths of the National Arena League (NAL).

On February 21, 2019, Bane signed with the Jacksonville Sharks of the NAL. Bane led the NAL in passing yards and passing touchdowns through week 8, before being injured and placed on injured reserve. Bane later returned to the Sharks for the playoffs, against the Columbus Lions, completing 14 of 14 passes for 207 yards and five touchdowns for a huge victory, taking the Sharks to the NAL Championship Game. They beat the Carolina Cobras in the title game.

Bane had signed with the Frisco Fighters for their inaugural 2020 season in the IFL. After the 2020 season was cancelled because of the COVID-19 pandemic, Bane re-signed with the Fighters for the 2021 season.

On November 4, 2021, Bane signed with the Carolina Cobras of the NAL.

On November 1, 2022, Bane signed with the San Antonio Gunslingers of the NAL. He refused to report to the team and became a free agent.

On April 11, 2023, Bane signed with the Iowa Barnstormers of the IFL.

On May 5, 2023, Bane signed with the Albany Empire of the NAL. On May 25, 2023, Bane was released by the Empire.

On May 26, 2023, Bane signed with the Orlando Predators of the NAL.

On October 17, 2023, Bane signed with the West Texas Desert Hawks of the new Arena Football League (AFL).

=== AFL statistics ===
Year	Team	Passing							Rushing		
Year	Team	Cmp	Att	Pct	Yds	TD	Int	Rtg	Att	Yds	TD
2016	Tampa Bay	46	97	47.4	526	8	4	67.63	7	16	0

Stats from ArenaFan:

== Coaching career ==
Bane was the quarterback coach and special teams coordinator for the IFL's San Antonio Gunslingers during the 2025 IFL season. In September 2025, he was named the team's head coach for the 2026 season.
