= Ryan McDaniel =

American football player (born 1988)

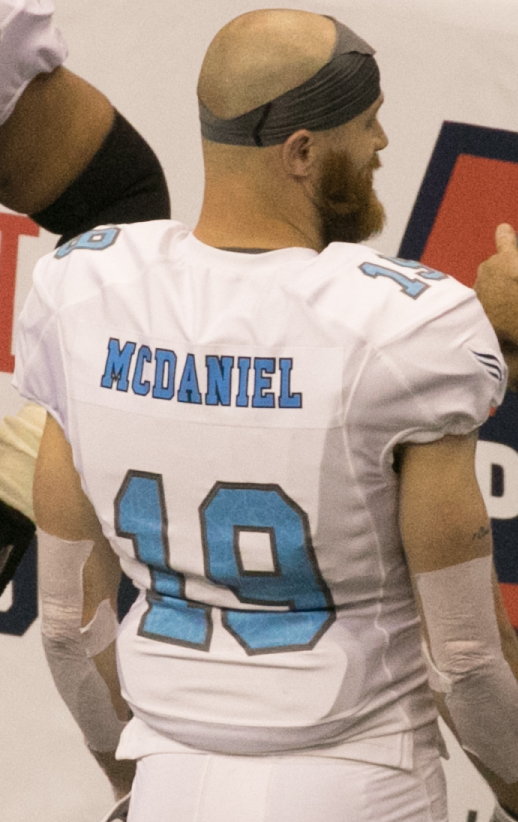
- McDaniel with the Philadelphia Soul in 2017

No. 19
- Position: Wide receiver

Personal information
- Born: September 8, 1988 (age 38); Buford, Georgia, U.S.
- Listed height: 6 ft 3 in (1.91 m)
- Listed weight: 200 lb (91 kg)

Career information
- High school: Suwanee (GA) North Gwinnett
- College: Samford
- NFL draft: 2011: undrafted

Career history
- Knoxville NightHawks (2012); Philadelphia Soul (2013–2017); Atlanta Havoc (2018)

Awards and highlights
- 2× ArenaBowl champion (2016, 2017); Second-team All-PIFL (2012)

Career AFL statistics
- Receptions: 425
- Receiving yards: 5,094
- Receiving TDs: 108
- Rushing yards: 94
- Rushing TDs: 4
- Stats at ArenaFan.com

Ryan McDaniel (born September 8, 1988) is an American former professional football wide receiver who played for the Philadelphia Soul of the Arena Football League (AFL). He played collegiately at Samford University.

== Professional career ==
McDaniel began his professional career with the Knoxville NightHawks of the Professional Indoor Football League (PIFL).

In February 2013, McDaniel was assigned to the Philadelphia Soul of the Arena Football League (AFL). McDaniel missed most of the 2014 season with an injury, but rebounded nicely in 2015. On August 26, 2016, the Soul beat the Arizona Rattlers in ArenaBowl XXIX by a score of 56–42. On August 26, 2017, the Soul beat the Tampa Bay Storm in ArenaBowl XXX by a score of 44–40.

McDaniel signed with the Atlanta Havoc of the American Arena League in December 2017.
