= Darnell Kennedy =

American gridiron football player (born 1976)

No. 9, 10
- Position: Quarterback

Personal information
- Born: October 8, 1976 (age 50); Mobile, Alabama, U.S.
- Listed height: 6 ft 1 in (1.85 m)
- Listed weight: 185 lb (84 kg)

Career information
- High school: LeFlore Magnet
- College: Alabama State
- NFL draft: 2002: undrafted

Career history
- Calgary Stampeders (2002–2003); Ottawa Renegades (2003–2005); Toronto Argonauts (2006); Huntington Heroes (2008); Florence Phantoms (2009); South Georgia Wildcats (2009); Georgia Force (2011–2012); Albany Panthers (2012); Alabama Hammers (2014)

Awards and highlights
- PIFL champion (2012)

Career CFL statistics
- Comp. / Att.: 75 / 152
- Passing yards: 986
- TD–INT: 6–6
- Passer rating: 66.9
- Rushing TD: 1
- Stats at CFL.ca (archived)

Career AFL statistics
- Comp. / Att.: 83 / 140
- Passing yards: 1,016
- TD–INT: 20–10
- Passer rating: 87.08
- Rushing TD: 2
- Stats at ArenaFan.com

Darnell Kennedy (born October 8, 1976) is an American former professional arena / indoor football quarterback. Kennedy played for the Georgia Force of the Arena Football League (AFL). He is also a former Canadian Football League (CFL) quarterback; he was a backup quarterback for the Toronto Argonauts, the Calgary Stampeders, and the Ottawa Renegades.

Kennedy played college football for Alabama State University from 1997 to 2001, and played in 2008 for the Huntington Heroes, an indoor football team in the American Indoor Football Association.
