= Xavier Mitchell =

American gridiron football player and coach (born 1986)

No. 91
- Position: Defensive lineman

Personal information
- Born: June 10, 1986 (age 40); Lakewood, California, U.S.
- Listed height: 6 ft 2 in (1.88 m)
- Listed weight: 252 lb (114 kg)

Career information
- High school: Long Beach High School
- College: Tennessee
- NFL draft: 2008: undrafted

Career history

Playing
- Cleveland Browns (2008)*; BC Lions (2009)*; Knoxville NightHawks (2012)
- * Offseason or practice squad member only

Coaching
- Clinton (TN) H.S. (DC) (2013–present)

Xavier Wayne Mitchell (born June 10, 1986) is an American former football defensive lineman. He was signed by the Cleveland Browns as an undrafted free agent in 2008. He signed to play with the BC Lions in 2009. He played college football for the Tennessee Volunteers, and he is currently the defensive coordinator at Halls High School in Knoxville, Tennessee.
