= London Crawford =

American football player (born 1986)

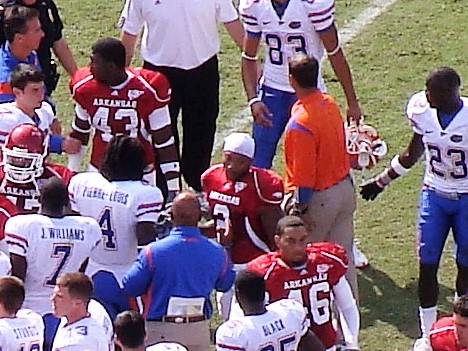
- Crawford (#2) with the Arkansas Razorbacks in 2008

No. 2
- Position: Wide receiver

Personal information
- Born: October 19, 1986 (age 40); Mobile, Alabama, U.S.
- Listed height: 6 ft 3 in (1.91 m)
- Listed weight: 205 lb (93 kg)

Career information
- High school: Mobile (AL) Davidson
- College: Arkansas
- NFL draft: 2010: undrafted

Career history
- Houston Texans (2010)*; Jacksonville Sharks (2012)*; Columbus Lions (2012); Jacksonville Sharks (2013–2016); Monterrey Steel (2017); Massachusetts Pirates (2018); Columbus Lions (2018)
- * Offseason or practice squad member only

Awards and highlights
- PIFL Offensive Rookie of the Year (2012); First-team All-PIFL (2012); First-team All-NAL (2017)

Career AFL statistics
- Receptions: 139
- Receiving yards: 1,569
- Receiving TDs: 34
- Rush yards: 31
- Rush TDs: 4
- Stats at ArenaFan.com

London Crawford (born October 19, 1986) is an American former professional football wide receiver. He played college football for the Arkansas Razorbacks. He was signed as an undrafted free agent by the Houston Texans in 2010.

== Early life ==
Crawford attended Davidson High School in Mobile, Alabama.

== Professional career ==
=== Houston Texans ===
After going undrafted in the 2010 NFL draft, Crawford signed with the Houston Texans of the National Football League (NFL). He was cut by the Texans following the preseason.

=== Columbus Lions ===
In 2012, Crawford signed with the Columbus Lions of the Professional Indoor Football League (PIFL). Crawford was named the PIFL Offensive Rookie of the Year, as well as was named First Team All-PIFL after leading the league with 103 receptions and 1,044 receiving yards.

=== Jacksonville Sharks ===
Crawford was assigned to the Jacksonville Sharks of the Arena Football League (AFL) in 2013.

=== Monterrey Steel ===
On January 17, 2017, Crawford signed with the Monterrey Steel.

=== Massachusetts Pirates ===
On December 6, 2017, Crawford signed with the Massachusetts Pirates. Crawford was released on June 20, 2018.

=== Columbus Lions ===
Crawford signed with the Lions on June 27, 2018.

=== Mexico City Mexicah ===
In 2018, Crawford signed with the Mexico City Mexicah of the International Arena Football League.

== Personal life ==
Crawford had two young boys. One died on May 17, 2014 at the age of three months to SIDS. It was telecast on the news that he played versus the Orlando Predators that same night that led him to two touchdowns in honor of his son.
