= James Fuller (American football) =

American football player (born 1969)

San Antonio Gunslingers
- Title: Head coach

Personal information
- Born: August 5, 1969 (age 57); Tacoma, Washington, U.S.
- Listed height: 5 ft 11 in (1.80 m)
- Listed weight: 208 lb (94 kg)

Career information
- High school: Stadium (WA)
- College: Walla Walla CC; Portland State
- NFL draft: 1992: 8th round, 201st overall pick

Career history

Playing
- San Diego Chargers (1992–1994); New Orleans Saints (1995)*; Scottish Claymores (1996); New Orleans Saints (1996)*; Philadelphia Eagles (1996); Portland Forest Dragons (1998)
- * Offseason or practice squad member only

Coaching
- Portland Forest Dragons/Oklahoma Wranglers (1999–2001) Associate head coach/defensive coordinator; Bakersfield Blitz (2002–2003) Head coach; Philadelphia Soul (2004–2005) Defensive coordinator (2004–2005) Interim head coach (2005); Dallas Desperados (2006–2008) Wide receivers/defensive backs coach; Dallas Vigilantes (2010) Defensive coordinator (2010) Interim head coach (2010); Richmond Raiders (2011–2015) Head coach; Maine Mammoths (2018) Head coach; Jacksonville Sharks (2019–2021) Defensive coordinator (2019) Head coach (2020–2021); Carolina Cobras (2022–2023) Offensive coordinator (2022) Head coach (2023); San Antonio Gunslingers Offensive coordinator (2024–2025) Head coach (2025–present)

Awards and highlights
- 2× All-Western Football Conference (1990, 1991); 2× Professional Indoor Football League Coach of the Year (2012, 2015); World Bowl champion (1996)

Career NFL statistics
- Tackles: 27
- Interceptions: 1
- Stats at Pro Football Reference

Career AFL statistics
- Tackles: 14
- Passes defended: 1
- Stats at ArenaFan.com

Head coaching record
- Regular season: 6–15–0 (.286) (AFL); 17–14–1 (.547) (AF2); 9–14–0 (.391) (NAL); 6–6–0 (.500) (SIFL); 28–15–0 (.651) (PIFL)
- Postseason: 0–2–0 (.000) (AF2); 3–3–0 (.500) (PIFL)
- Career: 6–15–0 (.286) (AFL); 17–16–1 (.515) (AF2); 9–14–0 (.391) (NAL); 6–6–0 (.500) (SIFL); 31–18–0 (.633) (PIFL); 69–69–1 (.500) (overall)

James Ray Fuller (born August 5, 1969) is an American football coach and former defensive back who is currently the head coach for the San Antonio Gunslingers of the Indoor Football League (IFL). He played college football at Walla Walla CC and Portland State before being selected in the 8th round of the 1992 NFL draft; he went on to play three seasons with the San Diego Chargers and Philadelphia Eagles while also spending time in the World League of American Football (WLAF) for the Scottish Claymores and Arena Football League (AFL) for the Portland Forest Dragons. He later served as a coach for the Forest Dragons, Bakersfield Blitz, Philadelphia Soul, Dallas Desperados, Dallas Vigilantes, Richmond Raiders, Maine Mammoths, and Jacksonville Sharks.

== Early life and education ==
Fuller was born on August 5, 1969, in Tacoma, Washington. He attended Stadium High School and after graduating from there played two years of college football at Walla Walla Community College. He transferred to Portland State University in 1990 and led the team with 104 tackles in his first year at the school. As a senior, Fuller made 84 tackles, four sacks, four interceptions and earned all-conference honors.

== Professional career ==
Fuller was selected in the eighth round (201st overall) of the 1992 NFL draft by the San Diego Chargers. He was placed on injured reserve to start the season. He returned to the team late in the season and appeared in one playoff game.

In 1993, Fuller made the Chargers roster and appeared in ten regular season games as a backup, making eight tackles. The Chargers finished 8–8, missing the playoffs.

Fuller was released by San Diego in September 1994 after being arrested for assault with a deadly weapon.

After spending 1995 out of football, Fuller signed with the Scottish Claymores of the World League of American Football (WLAF) in 1996. He appeared in all ten games as a starter, making 47 tackles, one sack, and five interceptions for 46 yards. The Claymores won World Bowl '96 against the Frankfurt Galaxy.

Fuller's performance with the Claymores impressed enough for him to be signed back into the National Football League (NFL) by the Philadelphia Eagles. He appeared in 13 regular season games, two as a starter, and made 19 tackles and an interception. He also played in their one playoff game. He was re-signed in 1997 but did not play.

In 1998, Fuller played four games in the Arena Football League (AFL) for the Portland Forest Dragons, making 14 tackles and a pass defended.

== Coaching career ==
In 1999, Fuller retired from playing and became the associate head coach and defensive coordinator of the Portland Forest Dragons, who were renamed the Oklahoma Wranglers in 2000.

In 2002, Fuller became the head coach of the Bakersfield Blitz in AF2. He led them to the Western Conference Championship in his first season.

In 2004, Fuller accepted a position as defensive coordinator of the Philadelphia Soul in the Arena Football League. After the fifth game of the 2005 season, he was named interim head coach. As interim coach, he compiled a record of 4–7.

In 2006, Fuller became wide receiver and defensive backs coach for the Dallas Desperados, where he served through 2008.

In 2010, Fuller was named defensive coordinator of the Dallas Vigilantes. He later became interim head coach, leading them to a 2–8 record.

Fuller was named head coach of the Richmond Raiders in 2011. He served in that position for five seasons and led them to a record of 37–24. He was named Professional Indoor Football League (PIFL) Coach of the Year in 2012 and 2015.

Fuller was named head coach of the Maine Mammoths in 2018, leading them to a 7–8 finish after a 1–7 start.

In 2019, Fuller became defensive coordinator of the Jacksonville Sharks. He was promoted to head coach in 2020, a position he served in until the end of the 2021 season.

Fuller was named offensive coordinator for the Carolina Cobras for the 2022 season. On September 13, 2022, Fuller was promoted to head coach by the Cobras.

On September 14, 2023, Fuller was named the offensive coordinator for the San Antonio Gunslingers of the Indoor Football League (IFL) for the 2024 season.

On March 31, 2025, Fuller was promoted to head coach of the Gunslingers after Tom Menas was relieved of his duties as head coach and general manager.
