= Tray Blackmon =

American gridiron football player (born 1985)

No. 30
- Position: Linebacker

Personal information
- Born: October 20, 1985 (age 41); LaGrange, Georgia, U.S.
- Listed height: 6 ft 0 in (1.83 m)
- Listed weight: 230 lb (104 kg)

Career information
- High school: LaGrange (GA)
- College: Auburn
- NFL draft: 2009: undrafted

Career history
- Calgary Stampeders (2009); Louisiana Swashbucklers (2012)

Awards and highlights
- SN SEC All-Freshman (2006); Second-team SN Freshman All-American (2006)

Tray Blackmon (born October 20, 1985) is an American former football player. He played college football for the Auburn Tigers.

== Early life ==
Although undersized for a typical national type linebacker recruit, Blackmon was considered a five-star prospect by several recruiting services. Scout.com ranked him #1 among the 2005 linebackers class. The Player of the Year in AAA for the State Champion Grangers, Blackmon had 116 tackles, 16 tackles for loss, 12 Sacks, 5 forced fumbles, 3 fumble recoveries, one safety, and one defensive touchdown as a senior.

== College career ==
After redshirting in 2005, Blackmon recorded 18 tackles, including 2.5 for loss, in six games in 2006, which earned him a spot on The Sporting News Freshman All-America Second Team. He amassed 41 tackles, including 25 solo, in last seven games of the 2007 season. He added 21 tackles in 2008 and has 84 tackles for his career.

Blackmon battled suspensions and injuries during his collegiate career. Blackmon was suspended from playing in Auburn's first three games of the 2006 season. In 2008, Blackmon suffered a broken bone in his wrist in the fourth game of the season.

== Professional career ==
On May 5, 2009, he signed with the Calgary Stampeders of the Canadian Football League.
