= Alabama Hammers =

Former indoor American football team

Logo

General information
- Founded: 2010
- Folded: 2016
- Headquartered: Huntsville, Alabama at the Von Braun Civic Center
- Colors: Green, gold, silver, white
- Mascot: Slammer the Hammer

Personnel
- Owners: Southern Sports and Entertainment LLC (Jeff Knight, CEO)
- CEO: Jeff Knight
- Head coach: Scott Sharp
- President: Joe Stroud

Nickname
- Hammers

Team history
- Alabama Hammers (2017–present)

Home fields
- Von Braun Civic Center (2012-2015)

League / conference affiliations
- Southern Indoor Football League (2011); Professional Indoor Football League (2012–2015)

Championships
- League championships: 1 PIFL: 2013

Playoff appearances (1)
- PIFL: 2013

The Alabama Hammers were a professional indoor football team based in Huntsville, Alabama. The team played in the Professional Indoor Football League (PIFL) from 2012 to 2015. The Hammers originally began play as an expansion team in the Southern Indoor Football League in 2011. The Hammers are the fourth indoor football team to play at the Von Braun Center; these were the Alabama Vipers of the AFL (2010), the Tennessee Valley Vipers of the af2 (2000–2004 and 2006–2009), and the Tennessee Valley Raptors of the United Indoor Football league (2005). The owner of the Hammers is Southern Sports Entertainment, LLC. The Hammers play their home games at the Von Braun Center. Their name comes from the Yellowhammer, the state bird of Alabama.

== Franchise history ==
=== 2011 ===
On November 5, 2010, it was announced that indoor football was to stay at the Von Braun Center in the form of the Alabama Hammers who would be playing in the Southern Indoor Football League (SIFL). The nickname "Hammers" was chosen due to the state bird of Alabama being the yellowhammer. On December 19, 2010, the Hammers announced that Marty Hammond, who had coached the Rio Grande Valley Dorados from 2006 to 2009, as their first ever head coach. On March 19, 2011, the Hammers took the field for their first ever game as a franchise, losing 20–67 to the Columbus Lions. The Hammers achieved the first victory in forfeit fashion, as the Mobile Bay Tarpons forfeited their April 29 game. The Hammers finished the regular season with a 4–8 record, failing to qualify for the postseason.

=== 2012 ===
Before the season began, the Hammers joined the Professional Indoor Football League after the Southern Indoor Football League dissolved. The Hammers went 3–9 in 2012, failing to making the playoffs.

=== 2013 ===
For the 2013 season, the Hammers hired former Alabama Vipers coach Dean Cokinos to be their head coach. The Hammers have achieved the level of success expected of coach Cokinos, who has a high winning percentage in lower level indoor football. They won their first championship when they won the PIFL title over the Richmond Raiders 70–44.

=== 2014 ===
The Hammers did not return to their championship form in 2014, losing their first 4 games of the regular season. After the Hammers seemed to have righted the ship with 3-straight wins, they went on another 4-game losing streak. The Hammers finished the season 4–8, tied for 4th placed in the American Conference, failing to qualify for the playoffs.

=== 2015 ===
During the offseason, Cokinos took a job as the head coach of the New Orleans VooDoo of the Arena Football League. He was replaced with Cosmo Dematteo, who had coached the filler team, Georgia Fire in 2014. However, in January 2015, Dematteo stepped down due to family issues before coaching a game for the Hammers. Scott Sharp was named the new Hammers' head coach on January 27, 2015.

In 2015, the Hammers folded upon the league folding.

== Notable players ==
See Category:Alabama Hammers players

=== Awards and honors ===
The following is a list of all Hammers players who won league awards:

| Season | Player | Position | Award |
|---|---|---|---|
| 2013 | Mico McSwain | WR | Most Valuable Player |
| 2013 | Mico McSwain | WR | Offensive Player of the Year |
| 2013 | Jake Trantin | LB | Defensive Rookie of the Year |

== Head coaches ==
| Name | Term | Regular season | | | | Playoffs | | Awards |
| Name | Term | W | L | T | Win% | W | L | Awards |
|---|---|---|---|---|---|---|---|---|
| Marty Hammond | 2011–2012 | 7 | 17 | 0 | .292 | 0 | 0 | |
| Dean Cokinos | 2013–2014 | 13 | 10 | 0 | .565 | 2 | 0 | PIFL Coach of the Year (2013) |
| Scott Sharp | 2015 | 5 | 7 | 0 | .417 | 0 | 0 | |

== Season-by-season results ==
| League champions | Conference champions | Division champions | Wild card berth | League leader |

| Season | Team | League | Conference | Division | Regular season | | | | Postseason results |
| Season | Team | League | Conference | Division | Finish | Wins | Losses | Ties | Postseason results |
|---|---|---|---|---|---|---|---|---|---|
| 2011 | 2011 | SIFL | Eastern | South | 3rd | 4 | 8 | 0 | |
| 2012 | 2012 | PIFL | | | 5th | 3 | 9 | 0 | |
| 2013 | 2013 | PIFL | | | 1st | 9 | 2 | 0 | Won PIFL Semifinals 61–46 vs. Albany; Won PIFL Cup II 70–44 vs. Richmond |
| 2014 | 2014 | PIFL | American | | 4th | 4 | 8 | 0 | |
| 2015 | 2015 | PIFL | | | 6th | 5 | 7 | 0 | |
| Totals | | | | | 25 | 34 | 0 | All-time regular season record | |
| Totals | | | | | 2 | 0 | – | All-time postseason record | |
| Totals | | | | | 27 | 34 | 0 | All-time regular season and postseason record | |
