= Albany Mall =

- Location: Albany, Georgia
- Coordinates: 31°37′03″N 84°13′00″W
- Address: 2601 Dawson Road
- Opened: August 4, 1976
- Developer: Aronov Realty
- Manager: Spinoso Real Estate Group
- Num. of stores: 75
- Num. of anchor tenants: 6 (5 open, 1 demolished and redeveloped)
- Floor area: 871,956 square feet (81,000 m^{2})
- Floors: 1
- Website: albany-mall.com

Albany Mall is an enclosed shopping mall in Albany, Georgia. Opened in 1976, it features Belk, JCPenney, Dillard's, Old Navy, and Books-A-Million as its anchor stores. An apartment complex, entertainment facility, and sports complex is currently under construction on the mall site. The mall is managed by Spinoso Real Estate Group. It has a retail floor area of 871,956 square feet (81,000 m^{2}).

== History ==
The mall opened on August 4, 1976, originally featuring Gayfers (now Dillard's), Belk, Rosenberg's, and Sears as its anchor stores. Aronov Realty received approval in 1987 for a new wing featuring a new anchor store, JCPenney. This store replaced a nearby location at Midtown Shopping Center. The store opened in 1988. Also that year, the Belk store was renovated. Rosenberg's closed in 1990 and became Mansour's a year later.

Old Navy joined the mall in 2000, and Mansour's closed a year later. In April 2004, Books-A-Million relocated into the former Mansour's space, replacing a nearby store on Old Dawson Road. JCPenney was renovated in 2011. Sears closed in 2017. The former Sears anchor store was demolished in 2021. Books-A-Million left the mall in 2025.

In late 2025, development began on a new apartment, entertainment, and sports development on the site of the former Sears. It is currently under construction as of 2026 and this new development will be part of the mall grounds. It is expected to be completed in 2027.
