= 2012 PIFL season =

2012 Professional Indoor Football League season
- League: Professional Indoor Football League
- Sport: Indoor American football
- Duration: March 10, 2012 – June 30, 2012

Regular season
- Season MVP: Antwon Young (RICH)

League Postseason
- 1 vs. 4 champions: Richmond Raiders
- 1 vs. 4 runners-up: Louisiana Swashbucklers
- 2 vs. 3 champions: Albany Panthers
- 2 vs. 3 runners-up: Columbus Lions

PIFL Cup I
- Champions: Albany Panthers
- Runners-up: Richmond Raiders
- Finals MVP: Antwontis Cutts (ALB)

PIFL seasons
- ← none 2013 →

The 2012 Professional Indoor Football League season was the inaugural season of the Professional Indoor Football League (PIFL). The regular season began on March 10, 2012, and ended on June 16, 2012. Each team played a 12-game schedule. The top four teams in the regular season standings commenced the playoffs on June 23. The final was played on June 30, with the Albany Panthers defeating the Richmond Raiders to win the inaugural championship.

== Regular season standings ==
2012 Professional Indoor Football League
Team	W	L	T	PCT	PF	PA	PF (Avg.)	PA (Avg.)	STK
y-Richmond Raiders	10	2	0	.833	722	589	61.2	49.1	W6
x-Albany Panthers	10	2	0	.833	694	554	57.8	46.2	L1
x-Columbus Lions	6	6	0	.500	720	713	60.0	59.4	W1
x-Louisiana Swashbucklers	6	6	0	.500	639	647	53.3	59.9	W1
Alabama Hammers	3	9	0	.250	642	683	53.5	56.9	L1
Knoxville NightHawks	1	11	0	.083	547	778	45.6	64.8	L5

y - clinched home playoff game

x - clinched playoff spot

== Playoffs ==
Semifinals
1	Richmond	56
4	Louisiana	50
2	Albany	60
3	Columbus	36

Finals
1	Richmond	56
2	Albany	60
