= Richmond Raiders =

Professional indoor football team in Richmond, Virginia

Logo

General information
- Founded: 2008
- Folded: 2015
- Headquartered: Richmond, Virginia at the Richmond Coliseum
- Colors: Blue, Black, Silver, White
- Mascot: Risky the Horse

Personnel
- Owners: Richmond Raiders, LLC (Mike & Elizabeth Fraizer)
- Head coach: James Fuller

Team history
- Richmond Raiders (2010–2015)

Home fields
- Richmond Coliseum (2010–2015)

League / conference affiliations
- American Indoor Football Association (2010): Eastern Division (2010); Southern Indoor Football League (2011): Eastern Conference (2011); Mid-Atlantic Division (2011); Professional Indoor Football League (2012–2015): American Conference (2014)

Championships
- Division championships: 1: SIFL Mid-Atlantic: (2011)

Playoff appearances (3)
- PIFL: 2012, 2013, 2015

The Richmond Raiders were a professional indoor football team located in Richmond, Virginia the Richmond Coliseum as their home arena. The Raiders began play in the 2010 as an expansion team of the American Indoor Football Association (AIFA). The Raiders moved to the Southern Indoor Football League (SIFL) when the Eastern Division of the AIFA merged with the SIFL in the winter of 2010, beginning SIFL play in the 2011 season. After just a single season in the SIFL the Raiders, along with four other members of the SIFL, became the charter members of the Professional Indoor Football League (PIFL). The team was then a member the PIFL from 2012 to 2015.

== History ==
In July, 2009, the American Indoor Football Association announced that they would be expanding into Richmond, Virginia. After a month-long name-the-team contest, the Richmond franchise announced that it would be nicknamed the Raiders on August 5, 2009. On October 12, 2009, the Raiders officially unveiled their new logo.

The Raiders' first game was the 2010 AIFA Kickoff Classic; on January 23, 2010, where they played an exhibition game against the AIFA All-Stars at the Richmond Coliseum.

On May 5, 2010, defensive coordinator Charles Gunnings replaced Mike Siani as the head coach, as Siani resigned.

Chris Simpson became the head coach of the Raiders for the 2011 season, coming over from the Baltimore Mariners on September 13, 2010. Even more change came about for the 2011 season, as the AIFA announced a merger with the Southern Indoor Football League (SIFL). In February, 2011, Simpson resigned before opening day, as he "relocated to Texas to pursue family business opportunities". He was replaced by James Fuller, who was the interim head coach for the Arena Football League's Dallas Vigilantes in 2010.

Former Richmond Revolution head coach Steve Criswell signed with the Raiders as a senior consultant for the 2011 season. Criswell brought several former Revolution players along, including QB Bryan Randall and DL Lawrence Lewis.

The 2012 season saw the Raiders move to the just formed Professional Indoor Football League (PIFL).

After starting the season with a 2-4 record, the Raiders rallied to win their final six games to clinch the #2 seed in the PIFL playoffs. After a 54-35 victory over the Nashville Venom in the opening round of the PIFL playoffs, the Raiders advanced to PIFL IV against the Columbus Lions. The Raiders were defeated 38-64.

After the 2015 season, and due to turmoil in the lower levels of indoor football, the Raiders announced that they would take the 2016 season off, as there was no league within reasonable geographic distance that the team's ownership felt comfortable joining. In summer 2016, the ownership announced that Raiders would not be returning and they would continue to focus on their sports performance training business.

== Notable players ==
See Category:Richmond Raiders players

=== Awards and honors ===
The following is a list of all Raiders players who won league awards:

Season	Player	Position	Award
2012	Antwon Young	QB	Most Valuable Player
2012	T. C. Stevens	K	Special Teams of the Year
2014	Devin Jones	DL	Defensive Rookie of the Year
2014	Devin Jones	DL	Defensive Player of the Year
2015	T. C. Stevens	K	Special Teams of the Year
2015	Jonathan Bane	QB	Offensive Player of the Year

== Head coaches ==
Name	Term	Regular season				Playoffs		Awards
Name	Term	W	L	T	Win%	W	L	Awards
Mike Siani	2010	2	5	0	.286	0	0	
Charlie Gunnings	2010	4	3	0	.571	0	0	
James Fuller	2011–2015	37	24	0	.600	3	3	2012 PIFL Coach of the Year; 2015 PIFL Coach of the Year

== Season-by-season results ==
League champions	Conference champions	Division champions	Wild card berth	League leader

Season	Team	League	Conference	Division	Regular season				Postseason results
Season	Team	League	Conference	Division	Finish	Wins	Losses	Ties	Postseason results
2010	2010	AIFA		Eastern	5th	6	8	0	
2011	2011	SIFL	Eastern	Mid-Atlantic	1st	6	6	0	
2012	2012	PIFL			1st	10	2	0	Won Semifinals (Louisiana) 56-50; Lost PIFL Cup I (Albany) 56-60
2013	2013	PIFL			3rd	7	5	0	Won Semifinals (Lehigh Valley) 44-40; Lost PIFL Cup II (Alabama) 44-70
2014	2014	PIFL	American		3rd	5	7	0	
2015	2015	PIFL			2nd	8	4	0	Won Semifinals (Nashville) 54-35; Lost PIFL Cup IV (Columbus) 38-64
Totals						42	32	0	All-time regular season record (2010–2015)
Totals						3	3	-	All-time postseason record (2010–2015)
Totals						45	35	0	All-time regular season and postseason record (2010–2015)
