= Columbus Lions =

American indoor football team

- Current season
Logo

General information
- Founded: 2006
- Headquartered: Columbus, Georgia
- Colors: Blue, black, silver, white
- Mascot: Leo the Lion
- columbuslions.com

Personnel
- Owner: Roger Beck
- General manager: Corry Black
- Head coach: Damian Daniels

Team history
- Columbus Lions (2007–present)

Home fields
- Columbus Civic Center (2007–present)

League / conference affiliations
- World Indoor Football League (2007); American Indoor Football Association (2008–2009); Western Conference (2008); South Division (2008); South Division (2009); Southern Indoor Football League (2010–2011); Eastern Conference (2011); South Division (2011); Professional Indoor Football League (2012–2015); American Conference (2014); American Indoor Football (2016); Southern Division (2016); National Arena League (2017–2022, 2025); American Indoor Football Alliance (2023); American Indoor Football (2024); American Arena League (2026–current)

Championships
- League championships: 6: SIFL: 2010; PIFL: 2015; AIF: 2016, 2024; AIFA: 2023; AAL: 2026
- Division championships: 3: AIFA: 2009; SIFL: 2011; AIF: 2016

Playoff appearances (18)
- WIFL: 2007; AIFA: 2008, 2009; SIFL: 2010, 2011; PIFL: 2012, 2014, 2015; AIF: 2016, 2024; NAL: 2017, 2018, 2019, 2021, 2022, 2025; AIFA: 2023; AIF: 2024; AAL: 2026

The Columbus Lions are a professional indoor football team based in Columbus, Georgia.

The Lions were founded in 2006 as an expansion team of the World Indoor Football League (WIFL). After the WIFL went under in 2007, the Lions joined the American Indoor Football Association (AIFA) where they played for two seasons. When the AIFA broke apart, the Lions joined the Southern Indoor Football League (SIFL). The Lions joined the Professional Indoor Football League (PIFL) in 2012 when the Southern Indoor Football League (SIFL) teams split up into two new leagues. After the 2015 season, the PIFL broke apart, and the Lions joined American Indoor Football for 2016. They were a founding member of the National Arena League (NAL) for the 2017 season. The then joined the new American Indoor Football Alliance for 2023 before they rejoined American Indoor Football for 2024. The Lions rejoined the National Arena League for 2025, then the American Arena League for 2026.

== History ==
Columbus Lions logo 2006–2022

=== Initial seasons (2007–2016) ===
The Lions were founded in 2006. They began play in the short-lived World Indoor Football League (WIFL) in 2007. The Lions' inaugural game on February 26, 2007, was marred by tragedy when opposing defensive back Javon Camon of the Daytona Beach Thunder was killed after a hard but clean hit by Lions fullback Cedric Ware during the fourth quarter. The Lions finished with the best regular season record, but lost the championship to the Augusta Colts. For the Lions' inaugural season, head coach Jason Gibson won the league's Coach of the Year Award.

The WIFL collapsed after the season and the Lions moved to the American Indoor Football Association (AIFA) where they played two seasons in 2008 and 2009, winning their division in 2009. They would then join the Southern Indoor Football League (SIFL) and play from 2010 to 2011. They won the SIFL championship in 2010 defeating the Louisiana Swashbucklers in President's Cup II. The SIFL split into two separate leagues before the 2012 season, with the Lions going to the Professional Indoor Football League (PIFL). In 2015, they defeated the Richmond Raiders in PIFL Cup IV.

Following the Lions' 2015 championship, the Lions moved back to American Indoor Football (AIF), formerly the AIFA, for the 2016 season. The Lions completed the regular season 8–0 and won the 2016 AIF Championship over the West Michigan Ironmen. One week after winning the championship, the Lions announced they were leaving the AIF for the 2017 season.

=== National Arena League (2017–2021) ===
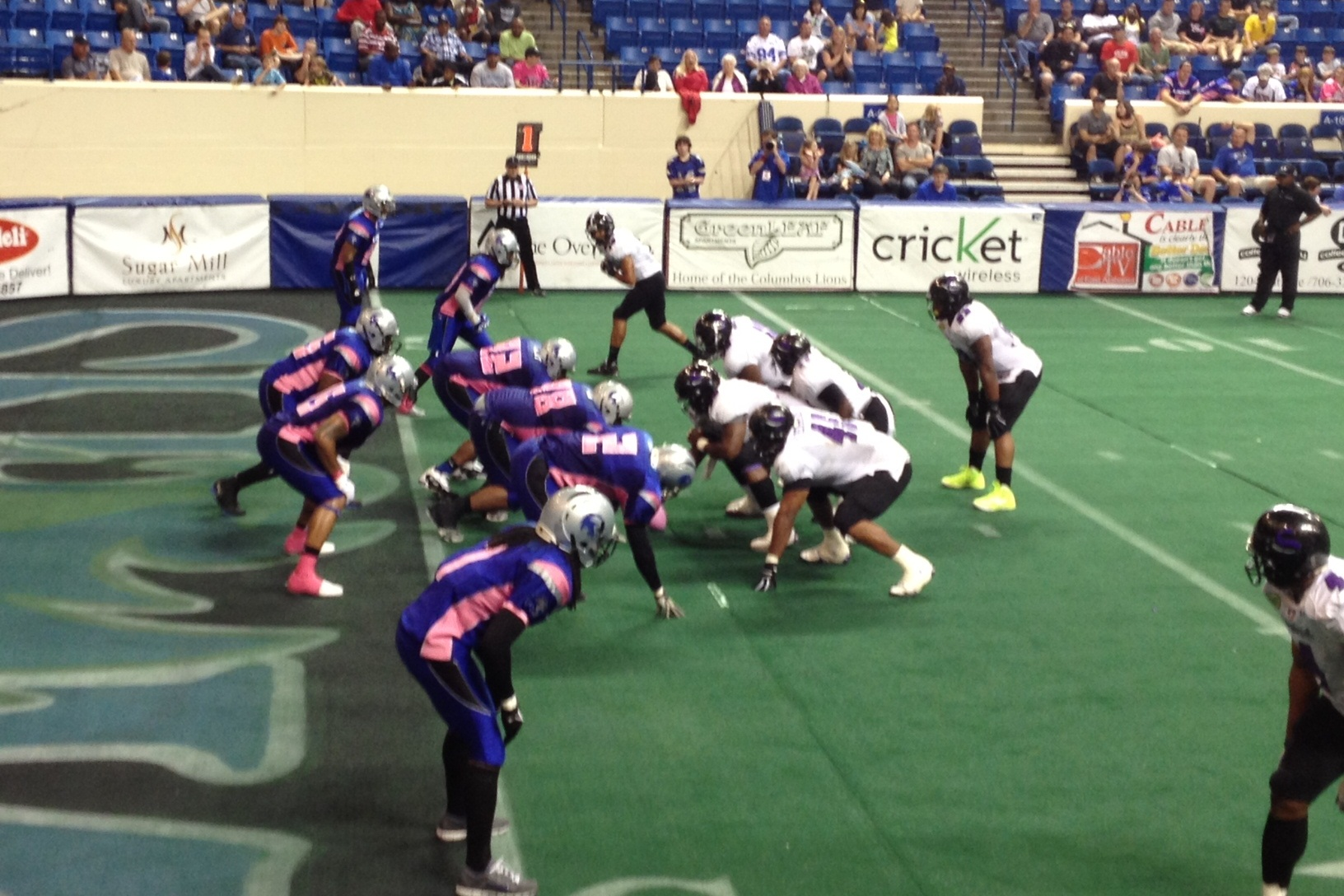
Columbus playing the Louisiana Swashbucklers on April 14, 2012. Note the pink numbers in support of cancer awareness.

In July 2016, Lions' owners Skip Seda and his father, Keke Seda, announced the formation of a new league called the Arena Developmental League to begin play in spring 2017. They named former Canadian Football League, Arena Football League, and AF2 coach John Gregory as the league's commissioner. In November 2016, the Jacksonville Sharks joined and the Sedas yielded control over the new league for it to become the National Arena League.

The Lions appeared in the NAL playoffs in every season they participated. They, and the NAL, would not play in 2020 due to the COVID-19 pandemic. They made three appearances in the NAL Championship Game, losing to the Jacksonville Sharks 27–21 in 2017, the Carolina Cobras 66–8 in 2018, and the Albany Empire 79–62 in 2021.

=== New ownership (2022–present) ===
On August 30, 2022, the Lions announced new ownership led by Jeff Levack, who also has ownership stake in the Orlando Predators and Albany Empire. He was a part of two staffs that helped the Empire win three championships in four years. On September 13, 2022, they introduced new branding for the team designed by former player and designer, Mike Jones. They also announced arena football veteran player and coach Chris McKinney as the second head coach in team history after Gibson had left and became head coach of the Jacksonville Sharks. On December 22, the National Arena League had announced that the membership of the Lions had been discontinued. One day later, the Lions announced they had joined the regional American Indoor Football Alliance. They played only home games, going 6–0, and defeated the Mississippi Raiders 55–10 in the league championship.

On August 4, 2023, the Lions announced their return to relaunched American Indoor Football for the 2024 season.

=== Return home to the NAL (2024 – 2025) ===
In 2024, the Lions announced they were returning home to the league they helped start, the National Arena League.

Following the 2025 season, the NAL removed the Lions from their list of teams on their Web site, and the Lions announced the franchise was up for sale.

=== Joining the AAL (2026–present) ===
On September 12, 2025, the Lions announced on their website and on social media their entrance into the revived American Arena League and with their rivals the Wheeling Miners. On November 13, 2025, the Lions introduced their new principal owner Roger Beck.

== Season-by-season results ==
League champions	Conference champions	Division champions	Playoff berth	League leader

Season	Team	League	Conference	Division	Regular season			Postseason results
Season	Team	League	Conference	Division	Finish	Wins	Losses	Postseason results
2007	2007	WIFL			1st	10	4	Lost World Indoor Bowl I (Augusta) 60–63
2008	2008	AIFA	Western	South	2nd	10	4	Lost Divisional (Mississippi) 50–52
2009	2009	AIFA		South	1st	11	3	Won Divisional (Fayetteville) 45–35; Lost Semifinal (Reading) 51–60
2010	2010	SIFL			2nd	8	3	Won Semifinal (Lafayette) 54–22; Won President's Cup II (Louisiana) 68–13
2011	2011	SIFL	Eastern	South	1st	11	1	Won Divisional (Trenton) 62–60; Lost Eastern Conference Championship (Albany) 61–75
2012	2012	PIFL			3rd	6	6	Lost Semifinal (Albany) 36–60
2013	2013	PIFL			6th	4	8	Did not qualify
2014	2014	PIFL	American		2nd	7	5	Lost American Conference Championship (Nashville) 39–44
2015	2015	PIFL			1st	8	3	Won Semifinal (Lehigh Valley) 69–41; Won PIFL Cup IV (Richmond) 64–38
2016	2016	AIF		Southern	1st	8	0	Won Southern Division Semifinal (New Mexico) 49–37; Won Southern Division Championship (Florida) 79–66; Won AIF Championship (West Michigan) 74–32
2017	2017	NAL			3rd	9	3	Won Semifinal (Lehigh Valley) 52–50; Lost NAL Championship (Jacksonville) 21–27
2018	2018	NAL			4th	8	7	Won Semifinal (Massachusetts) 50–36; Lost NAL Championship (Carolina) 8–66
2019	2019	NAL			4th	6	8	Lost Semifinal (Jacksonville) 43–67
2020	2020	NAL	Season cancelled due to COVID-19 pandemic					
2021	2021	NAL			2nd	6	2	Won Semifinal (Orlando) 61–43; Lost NAL Championship (Albany) 62–79
2022	2022	NAL			3rd	7	5	Lost Semifinal (Carolina) 51–65
2023	2023	AIFA			1st	6	0	Won AIFA Championship (Mississippi) 55–10
2024	2024	AIF			1st	5	0	Won AIF Championship (Corpus Christi) 46–20
2025	2025	NAL			4th	4	4	Lost Semifinal (Beaumont) 45-56
2026	2026	AAL			1st	10	0	Won Championship (Wheeling) 49-46
Totals						144	66	All-time regular season record
Totals						15	12	All-time postseason record
Totals						159	78	All-time regular season and postseason record

== Awards and honors ==
The following is a list of all Lions players who have won league awards:

Offensive Player of the Year
Season	Player	Position
2010	Chris McCoy	QB
2012	Maurice Dupree	WR
2017	Michael Reeve	WR
2018	Mason Espinosa	QB

Defensive Player of the Year
Season	Player	Position
2007	Jauron Dailey	LB
2007	Damian Daniels	DB
2009	Damian Daniels	DB
2010	Damian Daniels	DB
2011	Damian Daniels	DB
2013	Anthony Shutt	DB

Special Teams of the Year
Season	Player	Position
2007	Eugene Goodman	RB
2010	Trey Crum	K

Lineman of the Year
Season	Player	Position
2010	Franklin Lloyd	DL

Offensive Rookie of the Year
Season	Player	Position
2012	London Crawford	WR
2015	Casey Kacz	QB

Most Valuable Player
Season	Player	Position
2015	Terrence Ebagua	WR
2021	Mason Espinosa	QB

== Head coaches ==
Note: Statistics are correct through the 2024 American Indoor Football season.

Name	Tenure	Regular season			Playoffs		Awards
Name	Tenure	W	L	Win%	W	L	Awards
Jason Gibson	2007–2022	119	62	.657	12	11	
Chris McKinney	2023	6	0	1.000	1	0	
Damian Daniels	2024–present	10	4	1.000	1	1	
