= Albany Panthers =

Logo

General information
- Founded: 2009
- Folded: 2015
- Headquartered: Albany, Georgia at the James H. Gray Civic Center
- Colors: Black, Purple, Gold
- Mascot: Prowler

Personnel
- Owner: Rod Chappell
- General manager: Will Carter
- Head coach: Lucious Davis

Team history
- Albany Panthers (2010–2013)

Home fields
- Albany Civic Center (2010–2013)

League / conference affiliations
- Southern Indoor Football League (2010–2011); Eastern Conference (2011); South Division (2011); Professional Indoor Football League (2012–2015)

Championships
- League championships: 2: SIFL: 2011; PIFL: 2012
- Division championships: 3: SIFL: 2010, 2011; PIFL: 2012

Playoff appearances (4)
- SIFL: 2010, 2011; PIFL: 2012, 2013

The Albany Panthers were an indoor football team based in Albany, Georgia. The team joined the Southern Indoor Football League (SIFL) during their inaugural season in 2010. When the SIFL folded, the team joined the Professional Indoor Football League (PIFL) in 2012. The Panthers' home games were played at the Albany Civic Center until 2014.

The Panthers were the second indoor/arena team to play in Albany, following the af2's South Georgia Wildcats which played from 2005 until the league shut down after the 2009 season. In February 2014, the team was kicked out of their home arena by the city manager after claims they defaulted on their lease.

== Franchise history ==
In November 2009, Southern Indoor Football League (SIFL) Owner, Andre White, announced that he was in talks with the city of Albany to bring an indoor football team to town. In January 2010, the Panthers were announced as members of the SIFL. At their January 29, 2010 press conference, the team announced that Lucious Davis would be the team's first head coach. On April 3, 2010, the Panthers defeated the Columbus Lions 54–41, in the first game in franchise history. They would finish the season at 8–3 and as the #1 overall team in the league, clinching their first ever playoff appearance against the Louisiana Swashbucklers. They lost however, 41–35, ending their first season at 8–4. The loss was also the first home loss for the franchise.

=== 2011 season ===
The Panthers returned to the SIFL, which had expanded from just five teams to sixteen during the offseason, for their second season. Finishing 9–2, they clinched their second playoff berth and the #2 seed. They hosted the 9–3 Erie Explosion in the first round of the playoffs, winning 68–43 and earning their first playoff win and berth in the eastern conference championship against the Columbus Lions. They would go on to win that game as well, and coupled with a Louisiana upset over the undefeated Houston Stallions, would play in and host their first ever championship game. On July 1, 2011, they beat the Louisiana Swashbucklers 69–48, to win their first ever championship.

=== New league and 2012 season ===
The Panthers finished their 2012 regular season at 10–2, with their two losses coming on the road and by a combined score of three points, clinching the #1 seed in the playoffs. They beat the Columbus Lions 60–36 in the first round, ensuring they would host their second straight championship game. The Panthers were quarterbacked by both Cecil Lester and Darnell Kennedy. On June 30, 2012, they won PIFL Cup I, 60–56, against the Richmond Raiders. The win gave the Panthers back-to-back Championships, while playing in two different leagues. The win also increased their home winning streak to eleven games.

=== 2013 season ===
Albany returned to the PIFL for its second season. Winners of two straight championships, the Panthers looked to make it three in a row after many of the players who had committed to retire un-retired. The Panthers started the season with three straight wins, were the last unbeaten team in the league, and appeared to be on their way to continuing their dominance. The season quickly turned awry however, after the Panthers lost three straight road games to even their record at 3–3. The Panthers would finish the year winning four of the last six games. However, during that time they would have their 15-game home win streak snapped and lose franchise player and indoor veteran Antwone Savage to a career-ending leg injury. The Panthers finished the 2013 season at 7–5, and after losing the three-way tiebreaker, would qualify for the playoffs as the #4 seed. Albany would travel to Huntsville, Alabama for a rare Monday night game against the Alabama Hammers. The Panthers fell to the Hammers 61–46, losing just their second playoff game and ending their playoff win streak at five games.

=== City ends Panthers' lease ===
On February 18, 2014, the Panthers were kicked out of their home arena as Albany city manager James Taylor claimed that the team and owner Rod Chappell defaulted on their lease of the arena. Chappell told the local media that they had gotten their financial situation in order to avoid default by the end of February, yet was rejected by city leaders, who claimed Chappell and the team "breached their contract, which Chappell vehemently denies. He says the entire organization was hurt by the news. Taylor refused to respond to Chappell's charges. The franchise is looking for a new home.

== Notable players ==
See Category:Albany Panthers players

=== Awards and honors ===
The following is a list of all Panthers players who won league awards:

Season	Player	Position	Award
2012	Damian Daniels	DB	Defensive Player of the Year

== At home ==
In their three years of existence, the Albany Panthers have established themselves as a dominant home team. Having lost just three home games has helped the Panthers generate an average attendance of 5,286 in three seasons. Their current record at home including the playoffs is 25–3. From 2011 to 2013, the Panthers embarked on a 15-game home winning streak, including the playoffs. On June 15, 2013, the streak was snapped by the Lehigh Valley Steelhawks, 53–49. The loss was also the franchises first in their all black home uniforms, which were introduced at the start of the 2011 season.

== Columbus Lions rivalry ==
Being only 90 miles apart, its only natural for the Panthers and Lions to dislike one another. In fact, the rivalry has become so heated that there has even been an altercation between a coach and a fan. The games between these two teams are almost always tight, down-to-the-wire affairs. The rivalry became even more heated in 2012, with two of the Lions biggest names defecting to Albany. The Lions are one of only two teams to ever beat Albany at home during the regular season, However, the Panthers currently lead the series 8–4.

The Panthers also have a band, The Albany Panthers Marching Show Band, which is made up of Albany-Area high school and college students. The band performs during pre-game, halftime, and post-game, as well during the game itself, primarily in response to key plays and scores.

== Season-by-season ==
Season records
Season	W	L	T	Finish	Playoff results
Albany Panthers (SIFL)
2010	8	4	0	1st League	Lost Semifinals (Louisiana)
2011	10	2	0	2nd EC South	Won EC Round 1 (Erie); Won EC Championship (@Columbus); Won SIFL Championship (Louisiana)
Albany Panthers (PIFL)
2012	10	2	0	1st League	Won semi-final (Columbus) Won PIFL Cup I (Richmond)
2013	7	5	0	4th League	Lost semi-final (Alabama)
Totals	40	15	0	(including playoffs)	
