= Albany Civic Center =

Indoor arena in Albany, GA

Coordinates: 31.573897°N 84.150039°W

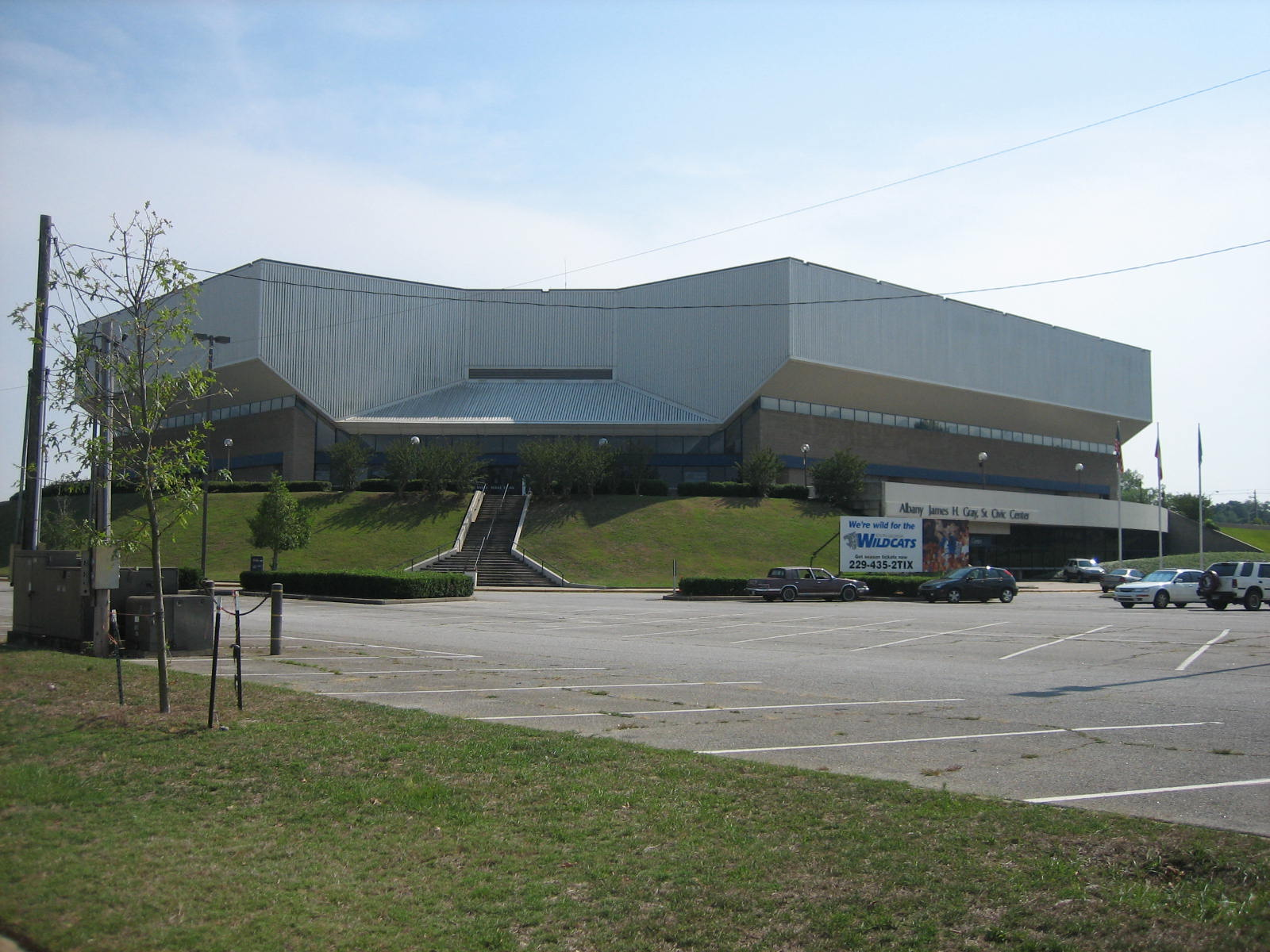
- Albany Civic Center as seen from Front Street.
- Interactive map of Albany Civic Center
- Full name: Albany James H. Gray Sr. Civic Center
- Location: 100 West Oglethorpe Boulevard; Albany, Georgia 31701-6808
- Owner: City of Albany, Georgia
- Operator: Spectra Venue Management
- Capacity: 10,712 (concerts); 9,082 (Sesame Street Live); 8,436 (basketball); 7,782 (rodeo); 6,570 (Disney on Ice); 7,200 (arena football)

Construction
- Opened: February 1983

Tenants
- Albany Sharp Shooters (GBA) (1991–1992); South Georgia Blues (GBA) (1992); Albany State Golden Rams (SIAC) (1994–1995); South Georgia Wildcats (AF2) (2005–2009); Albany Panthers (SIFL/PIFL) (2010–2013); Albany Shockwave (ABA) (2012–2013); Georgia Firebirds (AIF/NAL) (2016–2017); Albany Aces (NISL) (2024)

The Albany James H. Gray Sr. Civic Center (Albany Civic Center for short) is a multi-purpose arena located in downtown Albany, Georgia on the west bank of the Flint River. Opened in 1983, the arena is the only one of its kind in Southwest Georgia. Its maximum seating capacity of 10,711 is the largest of any indoor arena in the state of Georgia outside of metropolitan Atlanta and third-largest in the state behind State Farm Arena in downtown Atlanta and Gas South Arena in Gwinnett County.

== History ==
With the opening of the Albany Mall in the northwestern part of the city in 1976, most long-established firms closed their stores in downtown Albany, and commercial growth shifted to the north near the Lee County line. Mayor James H. Gray Sr. led an effort to revitalize the downtown area, with the Albany Civic Center as its crown jewel. The arena was named in honor of Gray after his sudden death just three years after its opening in 1986.

In July 1994, the building was narrowly spared from flooding as the Flint River rose out of its banks, cresting 23 feet above flood stage. The majority of the parking around the Civic Center was submerged, and traffic was halted across not only the nearby Oglethorpe Boulevard and Broad Avenue bridges across the Flint but all four bridges across the river in Albany. This led to a circuitous 100-mile detour to get from the west to east side of the city.

== Background ==
The Albany Civic Center was designed to be an arena and a convention center. As a result, the arena features 46,000 square feet (4,300 m^{2}) of exhibit space, plus an additional 6,000 square feet (600 m^{2}) of meeting room space. For sporting events, the arena seating capacity is 6,570 for Disney on Ice or any other ice skating events; 7,782 as a rodeo arena; 8,436 in a basketball arena configuration; and 9,013 for boxing and wrestling events. For concerts, the arena seats 5,728 in a half-house configuration, 10,297 end-stage, and its maximum capacity of 10,711 for a center-stage show. Up to 1,932 seats can be accommodated on the arena floor, while there are 7,794 permanent seats and 905 retractable seats in the arena bowl.

Today, the arena is a part of the Flint River Entertainment Complex, a group of entertainment venues located in downtown Albany that also includes the Albany Municipal Auditorium and the Veterans Park Amphitheatre.

== Featured former tenants and events ==
The Albany Civic Center has served as the home arena for numerous sports teams during its lifetime. It was the home field for three different football franchises: the Georgia Firebirds indoor football team which played in American Indoor Football in 2016 and the National Arena League in 2017; the Albany Panthers from 2010 to 2013, last playing in the Professional Indoor Football League; and the South Georgia Wildcats of the now defunct af2, playing in the arena from 2005 to 2009. The Civic Center also was the host arena of the former Albany Shockwave of the American Basketball Association; Albany State University Golden Rams basketball after the 1994 flood damaged their on-campus facilities; and the Albany Sharp Shooters/South Georgia Blues of the defunct Global Basketball Association.

From 1987 to 1992, the Albany Civic Center hosted the SEC women's basketball tournament.

The Albany Civic Center hosted several professional wrestling events. This included National Wrestling Alliance's Clash of the Champions III: Fall Brawl (which aired live September 7, 1988, on TBS). It hosted World Championship Wrestling's pay-per-views Great American Bash (1992) and SuperBrawl IV, in addition to three episodes of WCW Monday Nitro on TNT (October 16, 1995, April 22, 1996, and April 29, 1996).

Run-DMC's music video for their song "Mary, Mary" was filmed at the Albany Civic Center in 1988.
