= Sudduth Coliseum =

Arena in Louisiana, United States

Coordinates: 30°13′42″N 93°13′16″W

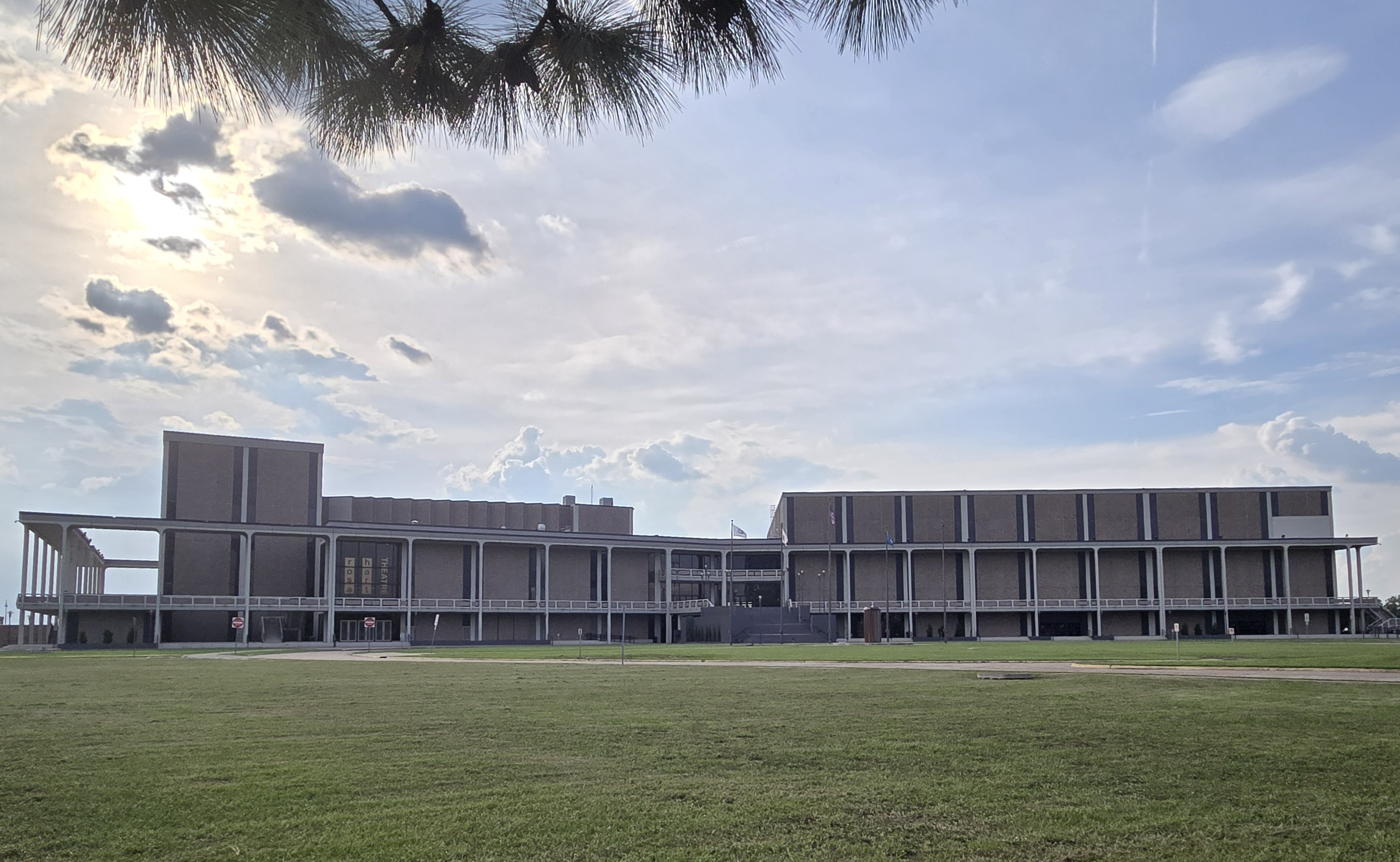
- Interactive map of Sudduth Coliseum
- Location: 900 Lakeshore Drive (downtown); Lake Charles, Louisiana 70601
- Owner: City of Lake Charles, Louisiana
- Operator: City of Lake Charles, Louisiana
- Capacity: Arena: 7,450; Rosa Hart Theatre: 1,960
- Surface: Concrete

Construction
- Opened: 1972

Tenants
- McNeese State Cowboys (NCAA) (1972–1986); Lake Charles Ice Pirates (WPHL) (1997–2001); Lake Charles Land Sharks (NIFL) (2001–2004); Louisiana Swashbucklers (IFL/SIFL/PIFL) (2006–2013)

Sudduth Coliseum, in the Lake Charles Event Center, is a 7,450-seat multi-purpose arena in Lake Charles, Louisiana, USA. Located on Lakeshore Drive, it is the main arena of the event center and is named for former Lake Charles Mayor James Sudduth.

== History ==
The arena is a venue for hosting concerts and special events, including the 2006 Louisiana State Choir festival and Contraband Days. It also serves as a host for gun shows, professional wrestling, dance performances, professional and amateur fights, school field trips and The National Day of Prayer ceremony in Lake Charles. Contraband Days is a large festival held on the grounds. The center served as a shelter for displaced residents whose homes were devastated by Hurricanes Katrina and Rita.

The center also hosted UFC 22: There Can Be Only One Champion, as well as UFC 24. It also holds Rampage in the Cage events. It also used to be the home stadium of Lake Charles' former pro hockey team, the Lake Charles Ice Pirates who played in the Western Professional Hockey League and the Louisiana Swashbucklers indoor football team. The center was authorized as the location of an American Basketball Association team, the Lake Charles Hurricanes. However, lack of funding caused the team to fold without playing a single game.

The coliseum was also the former home of the McNeese State Cowboys basketball team from 1972 to 1986 when the team moved to the Burton Coliseum.

Its former director, Allen "Puddler" Harris, is a former member of the bands of Ricky Nelson, Conway Twitty, and Jimmie Davis.

== Gallery ==
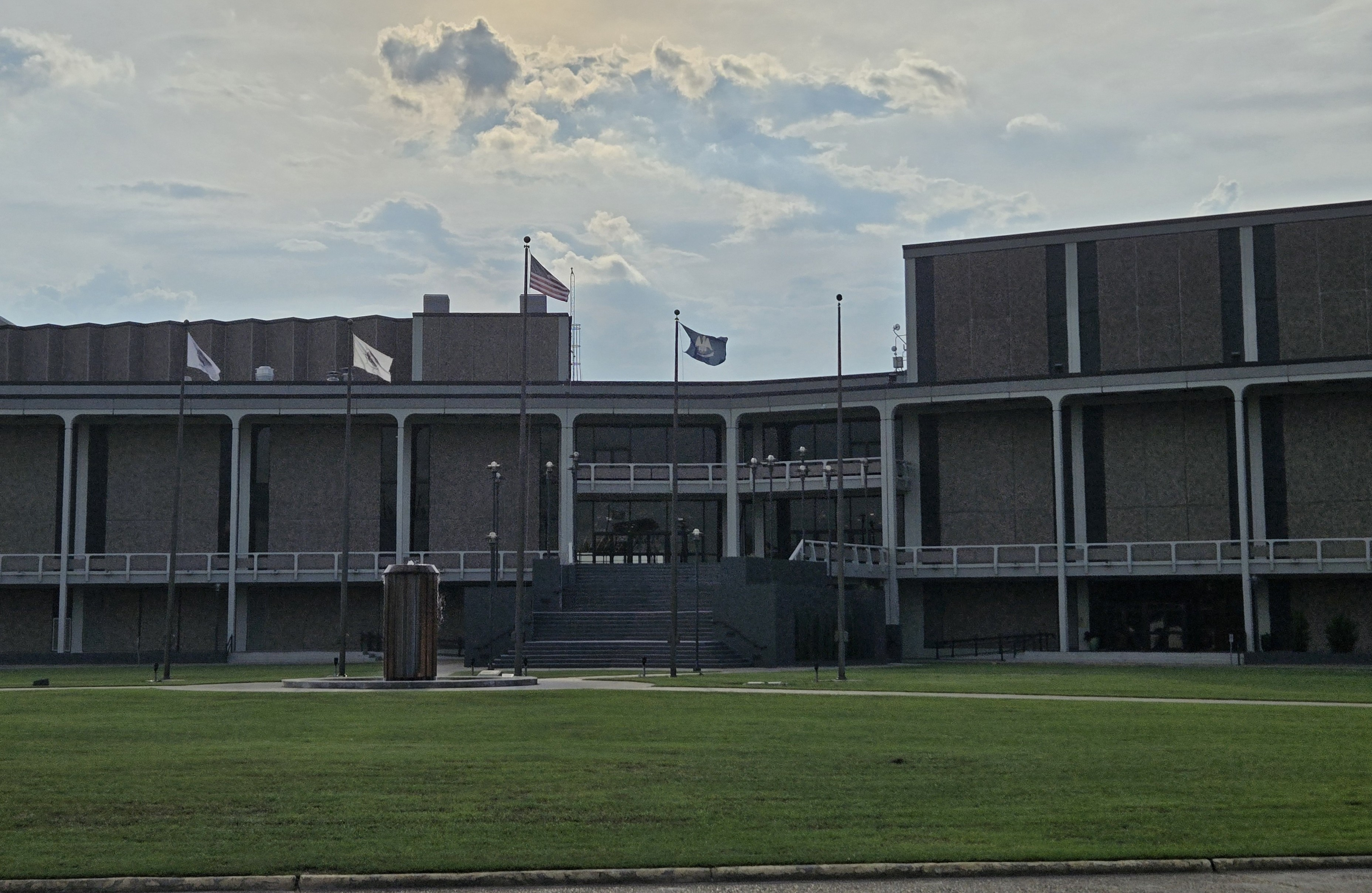
Lake Charles Event Center, Sudduth Coliseum main entrance

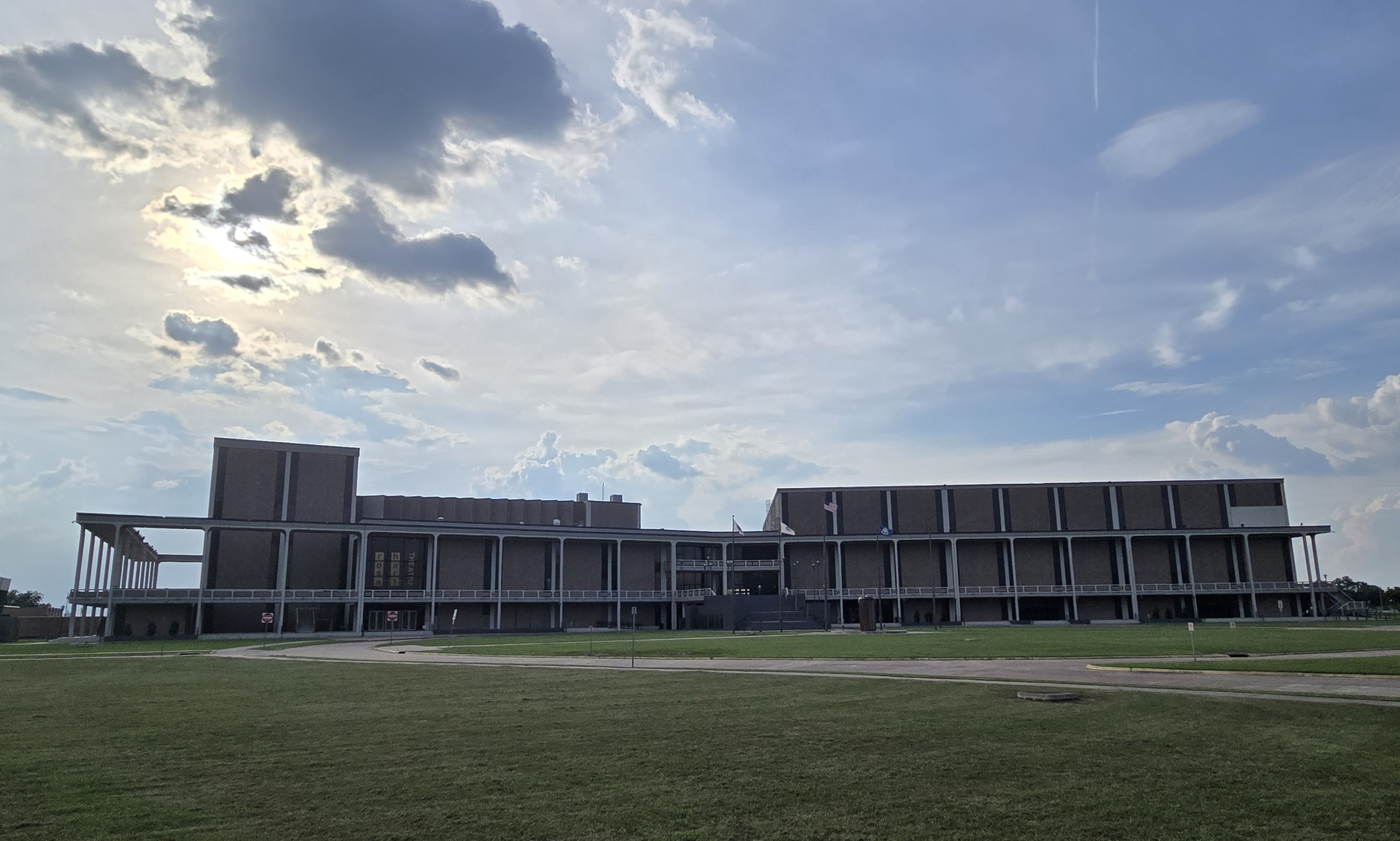
Lake Charles Event Center, Sudduth Coliseum

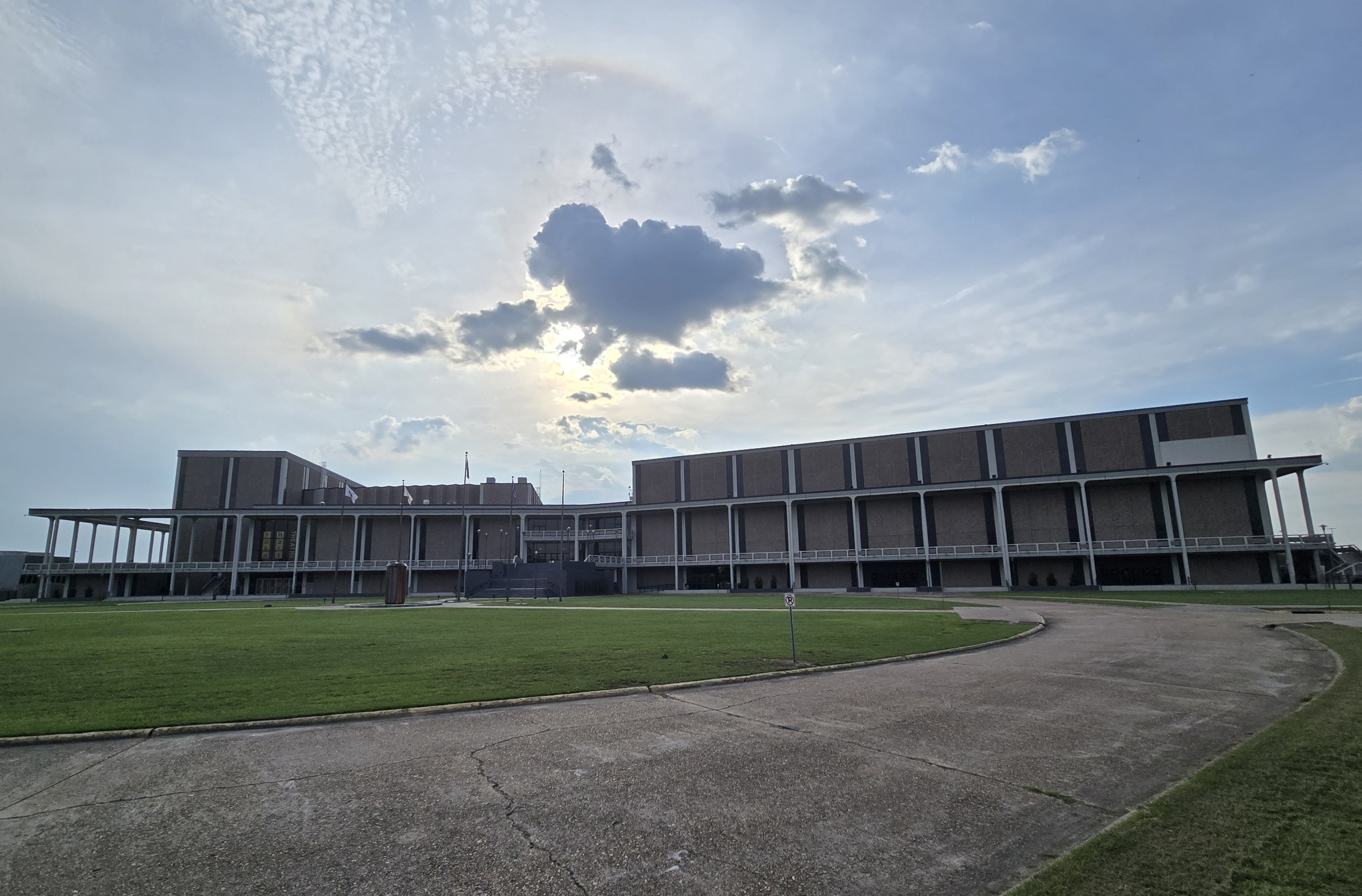
Lake Charles Event Center, Sudduth Coliseum main drive

== See also ==
- List of convention centers in the United States
- List of music venues

Events and tenants
Preceded by Five Seasons Events Center; Tokyo Bay NK Hall	Ultimate Fighting Championship venue UFC 22; UFC 24	Succeeded by Tokyo Bay NK Hall; Yoyogi National Gymnasium
