= Von Braun Center =

Convention Center and Arena in Alabama, United States

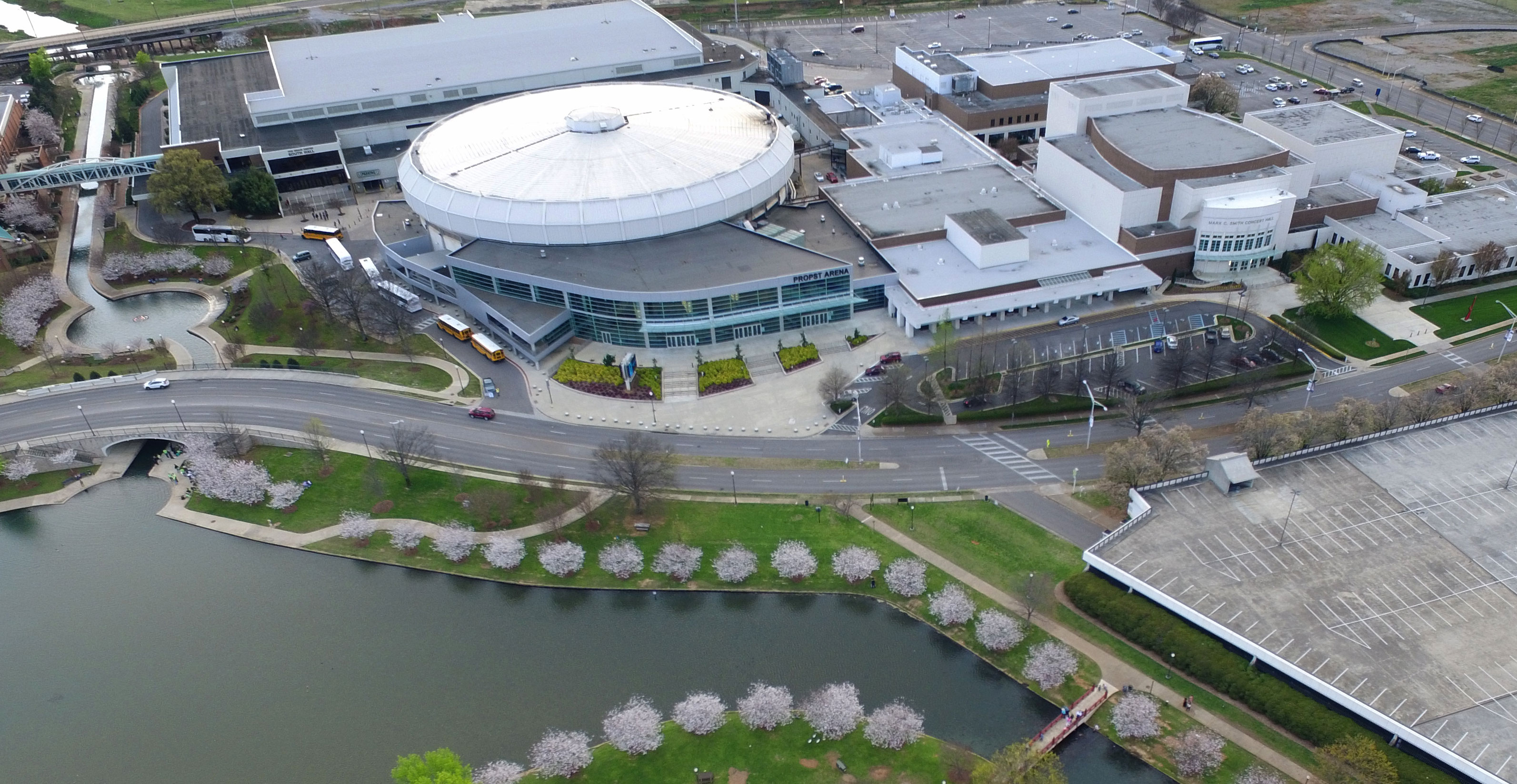
- Aerial view of complex (c.2016)
- Former names: Huntsville Civic Center (planning/construction); Von Braun Civic Center (1975-97)
- Address: 700 Monroe Street
- Location: Huntsville, Alabama, U.S.
- Coordinates: 34°43′37″N 86°35′27″W
- Owner: City of Huntsville
- Operator: Huntsville/Madison County Convention & Visitors Bureau

Construction
- Opened: March 14, 1975
- Renovated: 2010-11; 2019-21; 2022
- Construction cost: $15 million ($109 million in 2025 dollars)

Website
- vonbrauncenter.com Building details

General information
- Current tenants: Alabama-Huntsville Chargers (NCAA) (1979–present); Huntsville Havoc (SPHL) (2004–present)
- Groundbreaking: February 23, 1973

Design and construction
- Architect: Booz-Allen-Hamilton

Renovating team
- Architect: Matheny Goldmon
- Structural engineer: Hodnett Hurst Engineers, Inc. and Geiger Engineers
- Services engineer: Peter Basso Associates
- Civil engineer: CRS Engineering, Inc.
- Other designers: AVANT ACOUSTICS LLC and Peerbolte Creative LLC
- Main contractor: VCC

The Von Braun Center (known as Von Braun Civic Center until 1997) is an entertainment complex, comprising multiple exhibit halls, a concert hall, a playhouse, a music venue, additional facilities for meetings and exhibitions as well as an arena with a maximum seating capacity of 9,000, located in Huntsville, Alabama. The original facility debuted in 1975 and has undergone several significant expansions since its opening.

== History ==
It is named in honor of Wernher von Braun, the German-American rocket scientist and a former member of the SS. After von Braun's work for Nazi Germany in World War II, he was brought to the United States Army's Redstone Arsenal along with many colleagues via Operation Paperclip. Their work laid the foundation for the United States space program. Planning for the facility began in 1965. The original construction included the sports arena, an exhibit hall space now known as East Hall, a concert hall, a playhouse, and museum space for the Huntsville Museum of Art. The arena as originally built seated about 8,000 for concerts, and included scoreboards and a refrigerated floor for ice events. The concert hall included an orchestra rehearsal room, dressing space for performers, and a lounge for patrons. The facility, originally referred to as the "Von Braun Civic Center", opened on March 14, 1975.

The VBC's first expansion was a west-side addition to the exhibit hall, opened in 1980 and originally referred to as West Hall (the combined space is now called simply East Hall). Expanded kitchen facilities for catering were added in 1983. Originally this was a standalone building, but it became incorporated into the construction of North Hall in 1987. North Hall was constructed as a high-end exhibit and ballroom space, with carpeting and decorative lighting. A second-floor gallery can be opened to the main space or closed off, and it has a variety of meeting rooms and salons attached.

In 1993 the city was bidding to host a meeting of the American Bowling Congress, which would require space for bowling lanes and exhibits for six months. In order to supply the space, the city agreed to the construction of South Hall, which opened in 1997. Around that same time, the word "Civic" was dropped from the facility's name. South Hall is the VBC's largest exhibit space at 100,800 sq ft (9,365 m^{2}); it includes a large lobby area, a partitionable ballroom, and an underground parking garage. Its construction involved eliminating a portion of Williams Avenue and re-routing part of Monroe Street. A sky walk connecting South Hall to a newly constructed adjacent hotel was added in 2006.

The oldest portions of the facility underwent renovation in 2011. The improvements included new seating for the arena, reconstruction of the arena and concert hall lobbies, and a new exterior facade.

Another expansion in 2020 created Mars Music Hall and Rhythm on Monroe. Mars Music Hall can be figured with pit-style standing area for about 1,100 with additional night-club style seating on a mezzanine level or can be configured with seats on the floor for about 800. Across the hall, Rhythm on Monroe offers a variety of selections from pub grub to upscale dining and features a rooftop bar overlooking Huntsville.

Major renovations to the high-end exhibit space, North Hall were completed in 2023.

== Elvis Presley ==
According to The Von Braun Center website, Elvis Presley appeared May 30 through June 1, 1975 for an unprecedented five performances. It was the first time Elvis had played that many consecutive performances in a venue outside of Las Vegas or Stateline, Nevada.

== Sports ==
The VBC is the home of the Huntsville Havoc of the SPHL.

Former sports teams at the VBC include the Huntsville Lasers and Huntsville Flight basketball teams, the Huntsville Blast, Huntsville Tornado and Huntsville Channel Cats ice hockey teams, the Huntsville Fire (EISL) soccer team, the Alabama Vipers arena football team, the UAH Chargers ice hockey team, and the Alabama Hammers of the Professional Indoor Football League. The arena at one time hosted public ice skating, and youth hockey and figure skating programs, but those activities have since been moved to another facility.

On February 10, 2007, the Huntsville Havoc beat the Knoxville Ice Bears 7–6, in front of the largest crowd for a sporting event in the VBC's history, with 7,083 fans.

It was the site of the first-ever Total Nonstop Action Wrestling card, which featured in-ring cameos by Toby Keith and Sterling Marlin and was broadcast live on pay-per-view.

WWE held its September 8, 2003 episode of WWE Raw at the arena.

All Elite Wrestling (AEW) held its February 5, 2020 and February 28, 2024, episodes of AEW Dynamite at the arena.

In 2024, the VBC began hosting the conference tournament for men's and women's basketball for Conference USA.

== Entertainment and culture ==
The arena has hosted numerous rock, pop, and country music concerts. Three music videos for the band, Kansas promoting the Monolith Album - featuring a Sci-Fi Native American: On the Other Side, Away from you, and People of the South Wind were film in and on the Von Braun Center. The VBC Concert Hall has been the home venue for the Huntsville Symphony Orchestra since the facility opened in 1975. The concert hall also hosts the productions of the Broadway Theater League. The playhouse hosts the productions of Theatre Huntsville, the Fantasy Playhouse Children's Theater, and the Jim Parker Songwriters Series, as well as numerous community events. The yearly Panoply of the Arts outdoor festival takes place in Big Spring Park adjacent to the VBC.

The VBC provided space for the Huntsville Museum of Art from its opening until 1998, when the museum moved to a nearby facility. The former museum is now used as office space for VBC staff.

This place is also hosting to FRC (FIRST Robotics Competition) Rocket City Regional event.

== Expansion ==
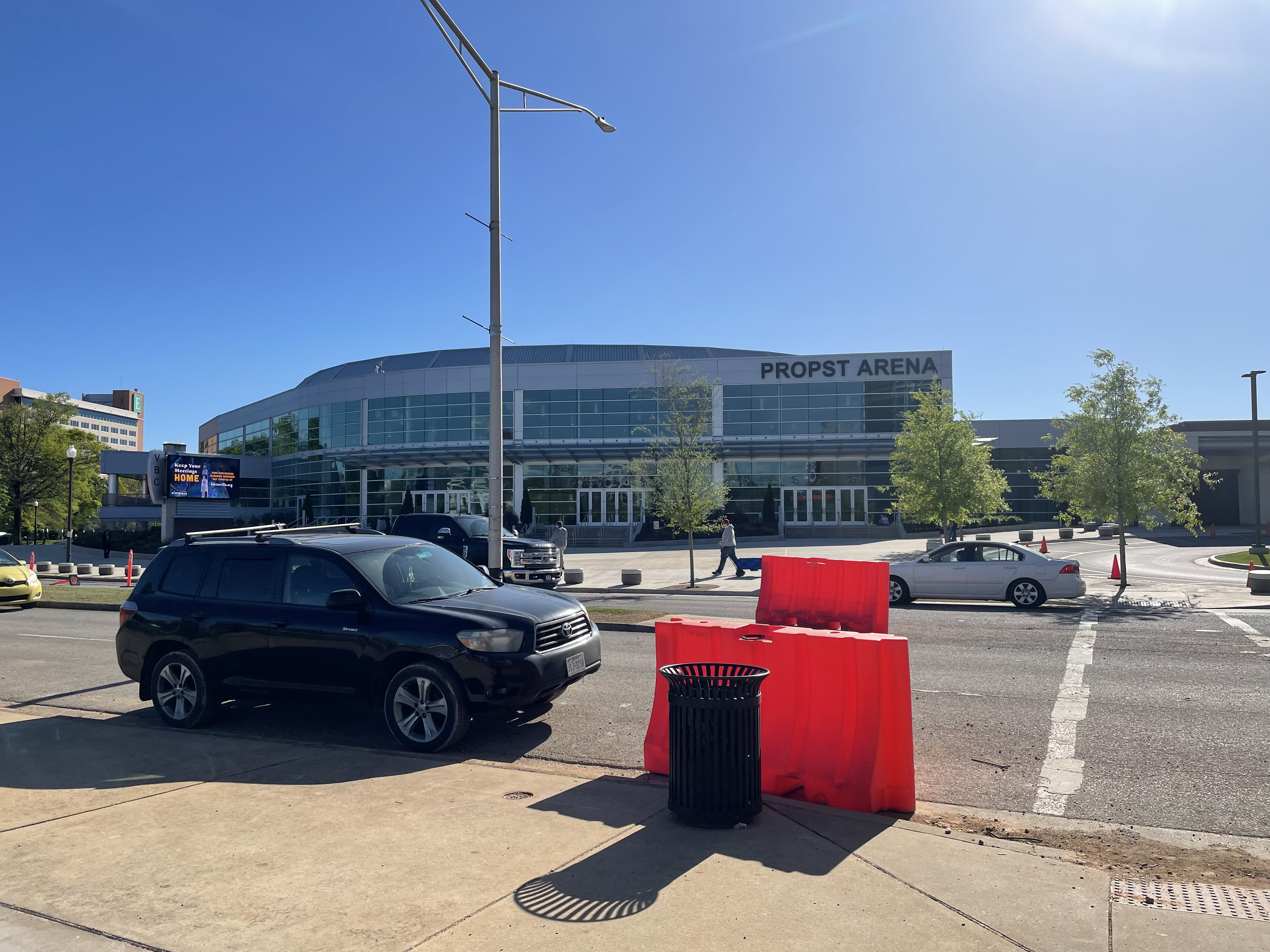
Propst Arena

On October 23, 2008, it was announced that the VBC Arena would undergo a massive $15M renovation and would be renamed the Propst Arena, after the family that donated $5M to the city for the expansion. On Friday, February 5, 2010, a groundbreaking ceremony was held marking further renovations to what is now known as the Mark C. Smith Concert Hall.

== See also ==
- List of convention centers in the United States

Preceded by first arena	Home of the Alabama Vipers; 2000 – 2010	Succeeded by Gwinnett Arena as Georgia Force
