= Professional Indoor Football League =

Indoor American football league (2012–2015)

- Sport: Indoor football
- Founded: 2011
- First season: 2012
- Folded: 2015
- CEO: Ron Selesky
- No. of teams: 5
- Country: United States
- Last champion: Columbus Lions (1st title)
- Most titles: Alabama Hammers; Albany Panthers; Columbus Lions; Nashville Venom (1 title)
- Related competitions: American Indoor Football; Indoor Football League

The Professional Indoor Football League (PIFL) was a professional indoor football league that played four seasons from 2012 to 2015. Like the Lone Star Football League, the PIFL was mainly composed of teams formerly part of Southern Indoor Football League (five former SIFL teams and one expansion team in total). Despite the name, this PIFL had no connections to the original Professional Indoor Football League.

== History ==
The PIFL began in 2012 with six teams in the southeastern United States, five of which joined from the Southern Indoor Football League, and the expansion Knoxville NightHawks. On March 10, 2012, the Richmond Raiders defeated the Columbus Lions, 64–58, in the first ever PIFL game. On June 30, 2012, PIFL Cup I was played in Albany, Georgia between the Albany Panthers and the Raiders. It was played at the James H. Gray Civic Center in front of 6,194 people. Albany won the game, 60–56.

Following a successful 2012, the PIFL added two new teams for the 2013 season. The Lehigh Valley Steelhawks of the Indoor Football League, as well as the Charlotte Speed, another former SIFL team who had previously committed to play in the IFL as well. On July 8, 2013, PIFL Cup II was played in Huntsville, Alabama between the Alabama Hammers and the Richmond Raiders. It was played at the Von Braun Center in front of 3,133 people. Alabama won the game, 70–44.

In the fall of 2013, two teams from the Northeast were added to the PIFL roster for the 2014 season. The expansion Trenton Freedom and the Nashville Venom joined the league for the 2014 season, as well as the Harrisburg Stampede, a former American Indoor Football (AIF) team.

Knoxville and Albany, according to the teams' respective websites, suspended play for the 2014 season. As they did not continue into the PIFL's final season of 2015, they had no opportunity to attempt to latch on to another league upon the PIFL's demise. Neither did the former Charlotte Speed franchise, which had not been allowed to participate in 2013 after announcing an intention to do so. This team is also now fully defunct.

For the 2015 season, the league added the Erie Explosion, the two-time defending champions of the Continental Indoor Football League, which had disbanded after the 2014 season.

On September 9, 2015, the league disbanded after several of its teams folded, with the exception of the Columbus Lions (the final PIFL champions) and the Lehigh Valley Steelhawks, both of which would join the American Indoor Football league and would go on to become founding members of the National Arena League in 2017. The Erie Explosion held out until January 2016, initially joining the Indoor Football Alliance, before suspending operations.

== Teams ==
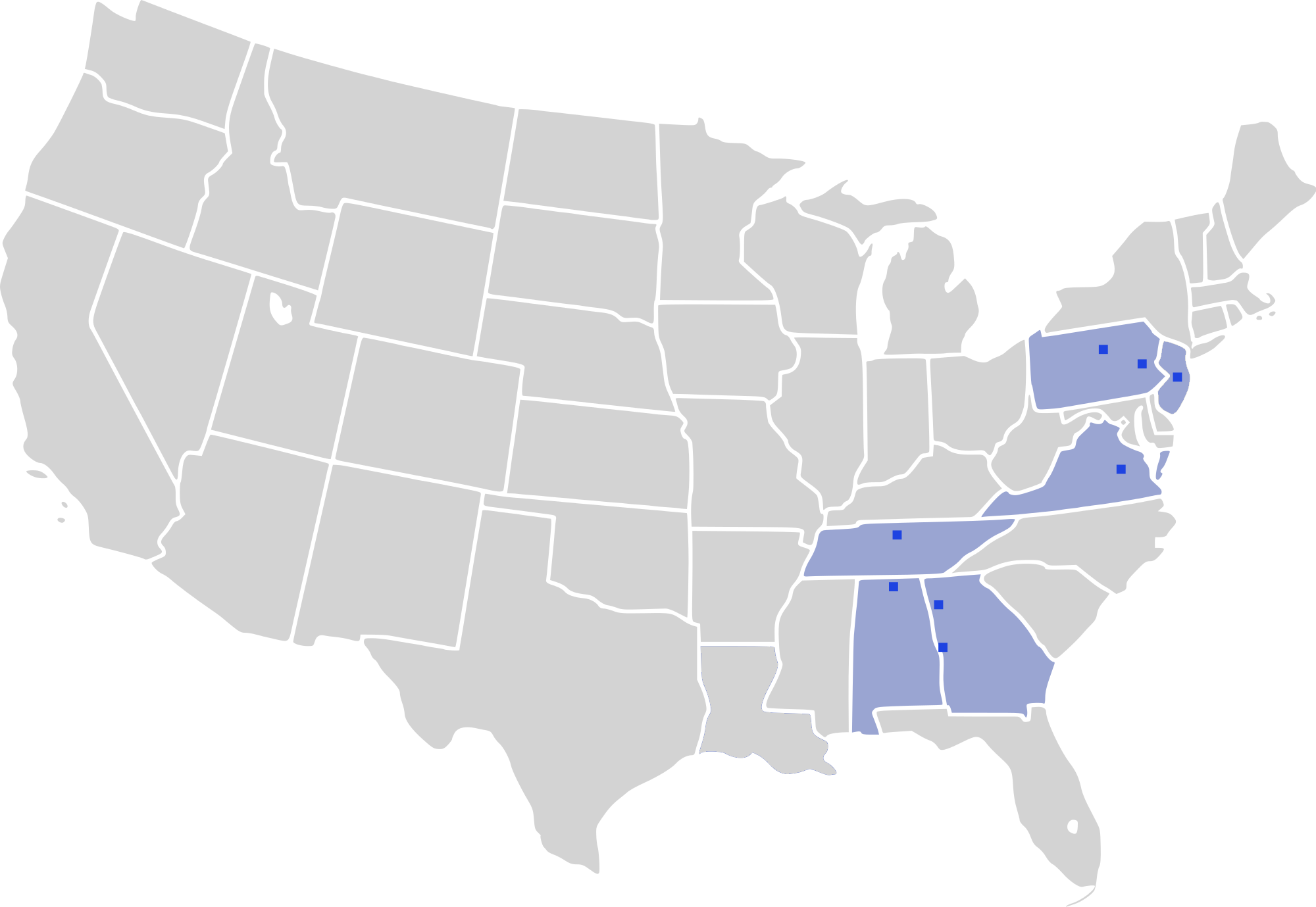
Map of the team cities in the Professional Indoor Football League.

Thirteen different franchises were issued during the PIFL's existence, but only 12 ever took the field for actual play – the Charlotte Speed never fielded a team in the PIFL as the franchise was revoked prior to the 2013 season. During the regular season, each team was allowed a maximum of 27 players on their roster; only 20 of these were eligible to be active (eligible to play) on game days.

=== Teams that played ===
- Alabama Hammers – played in PIFL from 2012 to 2015. Team folded after league folded.
- Albany Panthers – played in PIFL for 2012 and 2013 seasons before an unresolved conflict with the Albany Civic Center left the Panthers without an arena. Folded soon after.
- Charlotte Speed – originally set to play 2013 season, but franchise revoked prior to season opener.
- Columbus Lions – played in the PIFL from 2012 to 2015, joined the American Indoor Football league after PIFL folded.
- Erie Explosion – played in the PIFL during the 2015 season, left to rejoin the proposed revival of the Continental Indoor Football League.
- Georgia Fire – played in the PIFL for the 2014 season, filling in the void for the Albany Panthers.
- Harrisburg Stampede – played in the PIFL for the 2014 season before folding.
- Lehigh Valley Steelhawks – played in the PIFL from 2013 to 2015, joined the American Indoor Football league after PIFL folded.
- Knoxville NightHawks – played in PIFL for 2012 and 2013 seasons before folding.
- Louisiana Swashbucklers – played in PIFL for 2012 and 2013 seasons before folding.
- Nashville Venom – played in PIFL from 2014 to 2015. Team folded after league folded.
- Richmond Raiders – played in PIFL from 2012 to 2015. Owners folded team at season's end.
- Trenton Freedom – played in PIFL for 2014 and 2015 seasons before folding.

== PIFL Champions ==
Year	Winner	Loser	Score
2012	Albany Panthers	Richmond Raiders	60–56
2013	Alabama Hammers	Richmond Raiders	70–44
2014	Nashville Venom	Lehigh Valley Steelhawks	64–43
2015	Columbus Lions	Richmond Raiders	64–38

== Player and coach awards ==
The PIFL recognized a number of awards for their players and coaches.

=== 2012 ===
- Most Valuable Player – Antwon Young, Richmond Raiders
- Offensive Player of the Year – Maurice Dupree, Columbus Lions
- Defensive Player of the Year – Damian Daniels, Albany Panthers
- Offensive Rookie of the Year – London Crawford, Columbus Lions
- Defensive Rookie of the Year – Ginikachi Ibe, Knoxville NightHawks
- Special Teams Player of the Year – T. C. Stevens, Richmond Raiders
- Coach of the Year – James Fuller, Richmond Raiders

=== 2013 ===
- Most Valuable Player – Mico McSwain, Alabama Hammers
- Offensive Player of the Year – Mico McSwain, Alabama Hammers
- Defensive Player of the Year – Anthony Shutt, Columbus Lions
- Offensive Rookie of the Year – Thomas Gilson, Lehigh Valley Steelhawks
- Defensive Rookie of the Year – Jake Trantin, Alabama Hammers
- Special Teams Player of the Year – Armando Cuko, Knoxville NightHawks
- Coach of the Year – Dean Cokinos, Alabama Hammers

=== 2014 ===
- Most Valuable Player – Warren Smith, Trenton Freedom
- Offensive Player of the Year – Phillip Barnett, Nashville Venom
- Defensive Player of the Year – Devin Jones, Richmond Raiders
- Offensive Rookie of the Year – Roger Jackson, Trenton Freedom
- Defensive Rookie of the Year – Devin Jones, Richmond Raiders
- Special Teams Player of the Year – Dwayne Hollis, Lehigh Valley Steelhawks
- Coach of the Year – Billy Back, Nashville Venom

=== 2015 ===
- Most Valuable Player – Terrence Ebagua, Columbus Lions
- Offensive Player of the Year – Jonathan Bane, Richmond Raiders
- Defensive Player of the Year – Jerome Hayes, Trenton Freedom
- Offensive Rookie of the Year – Casey Kacz, Columbus Lions
- Defensive Rookie of the Year – Joe Powell, Lehigh Valley Steelhawks
- Special Teams Player of the Year – T. C. Stevens, Richmond Raiders
- Coach of the Year – James Fuller, Richmond Raiders
