= Keith Lewis (cornerback) =

American gridiron football player (born 1989)

No. 21 – Sioux City Bandits
- Position: Cornerback
- Roster status: Active

Personal information
- Born: March 28, 1989 (age 37)
- Listed height: 6 ft 1 in (1.85 m)
- Listed weight: 190 lb (86 kg)

Career information
- College: Virginia University of Lynchburg
- NFL draft: 2014: undrafted

Career history
- Tampa Bay Buccaneers (2014)*; Omaha Mammoths (2014); New York Jets (2014–2015); Calgary Stampeders (2015); San Diego Chargers (2015)*; Kansas City Chiefs (2016)*; Detroit Lions (2016)*; Winnipeg Blue Bombers (2017)*; Carolina Cobras (2018); Orlando Predators (2022); Albany Empire (2022); Carolina Cobras (2022)*; West Texas Warbirds (2023); Sioux City Bandits (2024–present)
- * Offseason or practice squad member only
- Stats at Pro Football Reference

Keith Lewis (born March 28, 1989) is an American football cornerback for the Sioux City Bandits of the National Arena League (NAL). He attended Virginia University of Lynchburg. He signed with the New York Jets after going undrafted in the 2014 NFL draft. He has also played for the Tampa Bay Buccaneers, Omaha Mammoths, Calgary Stampeders, San Diego Chargers, Kansas City Chiefs and Detroit Lions.

== College career ==
At Marie Sklodowska-Curie Metro High School in Chicago, Lewis amassed over 30 football scholarships and was one of the top players from the region. But with low ACT scores, he didn't get through the NCAA clearinghouse so he enrolled at the College of DuPage, a nearby junior college. He would go on to become an All-American at the junior college but grades were now an issue for him to transfer to a major program. So Lewis stepped away from football for nearly two years in order to get his life in order.

He applied for and got into Harold Washington College, a college in Chicago without a football program. At Harold Washington, the lack of a football program meant that Lewis had the chance to focus on the classroom. He spent more time studying and getting his grades up. Eventually the Virginia University of Lynchburg offered him a scholarship. In his final season at Lynchburg, he began to turn heads and caught the attention of agents and NFL scouts. All of a sudden there was a bit of buzz about this untested, extremely raw prospect.

== Professional career ==
=== Tampa Bay Buccaneers ===
After going undrafted in the 2014 NFL draft Lewis signed with the Tampa Bay Buccaneers. He was released by the Buccaneers on August 29, 2014 as they trimmed their roster down to 53 players.

=== Omaha Mammoths ===
Lewis played with the Omaha Mammoths of the Fall Experimental Football League (FXFL) during their 2014 season.

=== New York Jets ===
Lewis signed a reserves/futures contract with the New York Jets on December 30, 2014. Lewis was released by the Jets as they trimmed their roster down before the start of the regular season.

=== Calgary Stampeders ===
Signed with the Calgary Stampeders of the Canadian Football League on September 28, 2015.

=== San Diego Chargers ===
The San Diego Chargers and Lewis agreed to a contract on December 16, 2015.

=== Kansas City Chiefs ===
Lewis was signed by the Kansas City Chiefs in January 2016 and released by the team in June 2016.

=== Detroit Lions ===
Lewis was signed by the Detroit Lions in June 2016 and released by the team in August 2016.

=== Winnipeg Blue Bombers ===
On January 24, 2017, Lewis signed with the Winnipeg Blue Bombers.

=== Illinois Cowboys IA-FL (Iron Athletes Football League) ===
Lewis was signed June 2017

=== Carolina Cobras ===
On February 25, 2018, Lewis signed with the Carolina Cobras of the National Arena League (NAL).

=== Orlando Predators ===
On November 26, 2021, Lewis signed with the Orlando Predators of the NAL. On January 31, 2022, Lewis was released by the Predators.

=== Albany Empire ===
On February 14, 2022, Lewis signed with the Albany Empire of the NAL.

=== Carolina Cobras (second stint) ===
On March 22, 2022, Lewis was traded by the Empire to the Carolina Cobras of the NAL. On April 16, 2022, Lewis was released by the Cobras.

=== West Texas Warbirds ===
On October 24, 2022, Lewis signed with the West Texas Warbirds of the NAL. On March 2, 2023, Lewis was released by the Warbirds.

=== Sioux City Bandits ===
On December 7, 2023, Lewis signed with the Sioux City Bandits of the NAL.
