= Kendrick Ings =

American gridiron football player (born 1990)

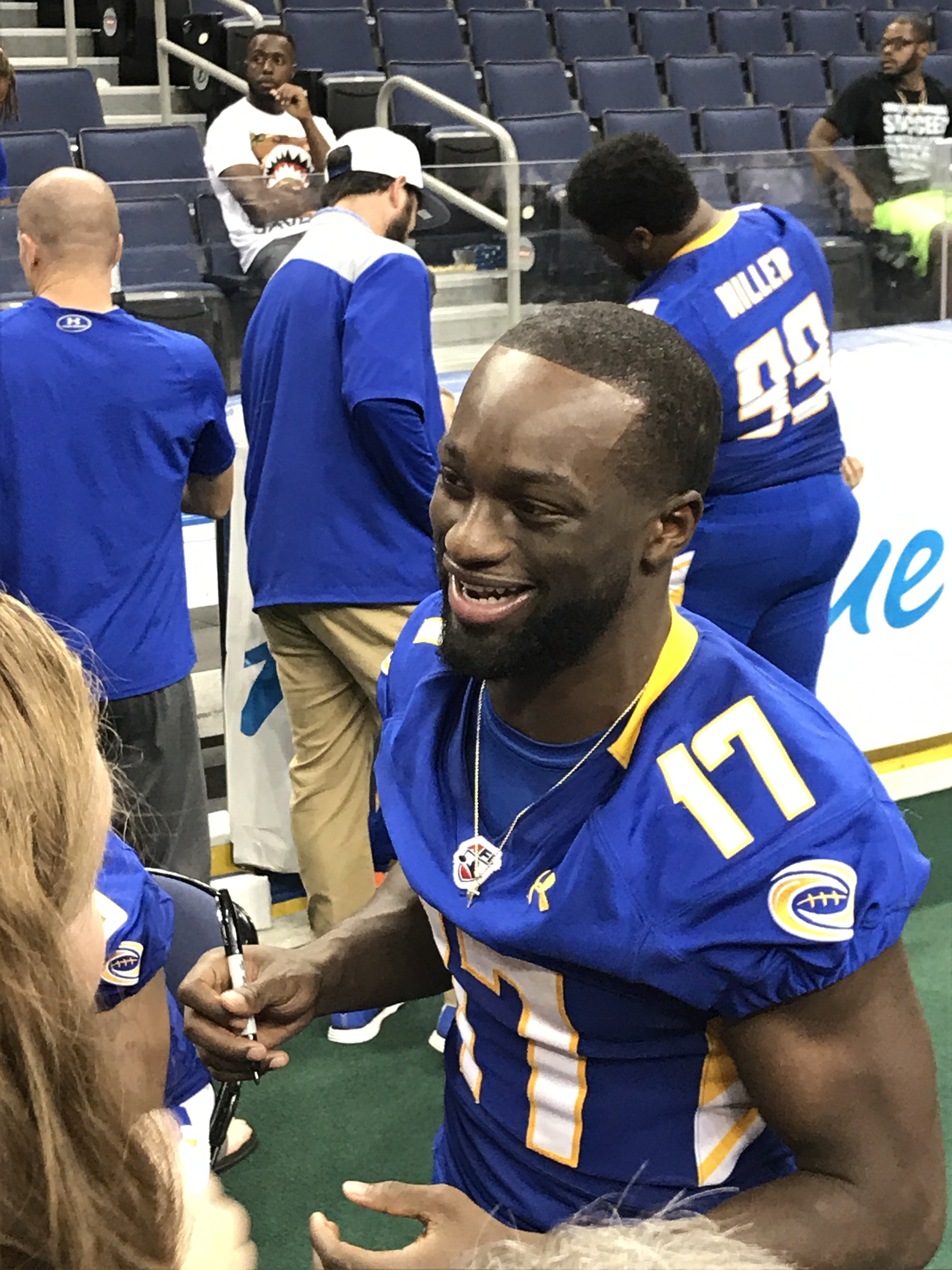
- Ings in 2017

Profile
- Position: Wide receiver

Personal information
- Born: June 17, 1990 (age 36); Miami, Florida
- Listed height: 5 ft 10 in (1.78 m)
- Listed weight: 180 lb (82 kg)

Career information
- High school: Lithonia (GA) Miller Grove
- NFL draft: 2011: undrafted

Career history
- Dodge City Law (2014); Tampa Bay Storm (2015–2017); Detroit Lions (2015)*; BC Lions (2016)*; Tampa Bay Buccaneers (2016)*; Baltimore Brigade (2018); Atlantic City Blackjacks (2019); Carolina Cobras (2021–2022); Fayetteville Mustangs (2023); Carolina Cobras (2024)
- * Offseason or practice squad member only

Awards and highlights
- AFL Playermaker of the Year (2017); First-team All-Arena (2017)

Career AFL statistics
- Receptions: 186
- Receiving yards: 2,381
- Receiving TDs: 39
- Kick returns: 160
- Kick return yards: 3,038
- Stats at ArenaFan.com

Kendrick Ings (born June 17, 1990) is an American football wide receiver. He has also been a member of the Dodge City Law (CPIFL), Detroit Lions (NFL), BC Lions (CFL), Tampa Bay Buccaneers (NFL), Baltimore Brigade (AFL), Atlantic City Blackjacks (AFL), Carolina Cobras (NAL), and Fayetteville Mustangs (NAL).

== Early life ==
Ings attended Miller Grove High School in Lithonia, Georgia, where he was a member of the football, basketball and track & field teams. As a senior, Ings tore his ACL, and didn't qualify for college academically. Ings then planned to attend a junior college, where a paperwork error left him without a scholarship. He then spent a year as a student at Fort Valley State University. He then enrolled at yet another junior college, where he was told that he could not play football due to a heart murmur. Ings later decided to drop out of school.

== Professional career ==
=== Early attempts ===
Ings attended an open tryout for the BC Lions of the Canadian Football League (CFL) in 2011, where he was told that he was too raw of a talent. Ings went on to join the semi-pro Atlanta Chiefs to help sharpen his skills.

=== Dodge City Law ===
Ings' play with the Chiefs landed him a spot on the Dodge City Law of the Champions Professional Indoor Football League (CPIFL).

=== Tampa Bay Storm ===
Ings attended an open tryout in November, 2014, and was assigned to the Tampa Bay Storm on November 20, 2014. Ings made the Storm roster after training camp. Ings was the Storm's third leading receiver on the season, while also serving as the team's primary kick returner. On October 8, 2015, the Storm exercised their rookie option on Ings, retaining him for the 2016 season. On June 21, 2016, Ings was activated from the Other League Exempt list. In 2017, Ings was named the AFL's Playermaker of the Year after leading the league in kick return yards with 1,063, kick return touchdowns with 4 and all-purpose yards with 2,219. He also finished second in receptions with 98 and third in receiving yards with 1,141. He also earned First-team All-Arena honors as both a wide receiver and a special teams player. The Storm folded in December 2017.

=== Detroit Lions ===
On September 9, 2015, Ings was signed to the Detroit Lions practice squad. On September 22, 2015, Ings was released by the Lions.

=== BC Lions ===
On March 8, 2016 Ings agreed to a contract with the BC Lions of the Canadian Football League. On June 18, 2016, Ings was released by the Lions.

=== Tampa Bay Buccaneers ===
On December 21, 2016, Ings was signed to the Tampa Bay Buccaneers practice squad.

=== Baltimore Brigade ===
On March 20, 2018, Ings was assigned to the Baltimore Brigade.

=== Atlantic City Blackjacks ===
On April 2, 2019, Ings was assigned to the Atlantic City Blackjacks.

=== Carolina Cobras ===
On May 11, 2021, Ings signed with the Carolina Cobras of the National Arena League (NAL). On November 8, 2021, Ings re-signed with the Carolina Cobras of the National Arena League (NAL).

=== Fayetteville Mustangs ===
On November 16, 2022, Ings signed with the Fayetteville Mustangs of the National Arena League (NAL).

=== Carolina Cobras (second stint) ===
On December 30, 2023, Ings signed with the Carolina Cobras of the National Arena League (NAL) for his second stint with the team.
