= Delvon Randall =

American football player (born 1996)

Minnesota Monsters
- Position: Safety

Personal information
- Born: December 14, 1996 (age 29); Pittsburgh, Pennsylvania
- Listed height: 6 ft 1 in (1.85 m)
- Listed weight: 215 lb (98 kg)

Career information
- High school: Gateway High School (Monroeville, Pennsylvania)
- College: Temple
- NFL draft: 2019: undrafted

Career history
- Philadelphia Eagles (2019)*; Ottawa Redblacks (2020–2021)*; Orlando Predators (2022–2024); Minnesota Monsters (2026-present)
- * Offseason or practice squad member only

Awards and highlights
- Second-team All-NAL (2022); First-team All-AAC (2017)
- Stats at Pro Football Reference

Delvon Randall (born December 14, 1996) is an American football safety who is currently a free agent. He played college football for the Temple Owls.

== Early life ==
Randall was born on December 14, 1996, in Pittsburgh, Pennsylvania, and attended Gateway High School. He played wide receiver in high school under head coach, Don Militzer.

== Professional career ==
=== Philadelphia Eagles ===
On April 28, 2019, Randall signed as an undrafted free agent with the Philadelphia Eagles of the National Football League (NFL). On May 3, 2019, Randall was released by the Eagles.

=== Ottawa Redblacks ===
On January 31, 2020, Randall signed with the Ottawa Redblacks of the Canadian Football League (CFL). On January 11, 2021, Randall was released by the Redblacks.

=== Orlando Predators ===
On March 25, 2022, Randall signed with the Orlando Predators of the National Arena League (NAL). On October 31, 2022, Randall re-signed with the Predators for the 2023 season. Randall became a free agent at the end of the season. Randall played for the Predators again in 2024.

=== Minnesota Monsters ===
On September 22, 2026, Randall signed with the Minnesota Monsters.
