= Rakeem Cato =

American football player (born 1992)

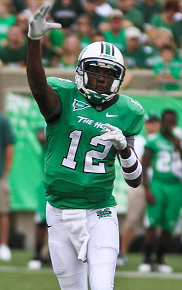
- Cato while at Marshall

Salina Liberty
- Position: Quarterback
- Roster status: Active

Personal information
- Born: March 28, 1992 (age 34); Liberty City, Florida, U.S.
- Listed height: 6 ft 0 in (1.83 m)
- Listed weight: 181 lb (82 kg)

Career information
- High school: Miami Central (West Little River, Florida)
- College: Marshall (2011–2014)

Career history
- 2015–2016: Montreal Alouettes
- 2018: Richmond Roughriders
- 2019: Gulf Coast Fire
- 2020–2022: Orlando Predators
- 2023: Fayetteville Mustangs
- 2023: Orlando Predators
- 2024: Iowa Rampage
- 2024: Kansas City Goats
- 2025–present: Salina Liberty

Awards and highlights
- C-USA champion (2014); C-USA MVP (2012); 2× C-USA OPOY (2013, 2014); 2× First-team All-C-USA (2012, 2014); Second-team All-C-USA (2013); Military Bowl MVP (2013); Boca Raton Bowl MVP (2014); Hardman Award (2014)

Career CFL statistics
- Completion %: 68.5%
- Passing yards: 3,570
- TD–INT: 17–11
- Rushing TDs: 1
- Stats at CFL.ca

Rakeem Cato (born March 28, 1992) is an American professional football quarterback for the Salina Liberty of Arena Football One. He played college football at Marshall and was the Thundering Herd's starting quarterback from 2011 to 2014. As a professional, he has played for the Montreal Alouettes of the Canadian Football League (CFL), Richmond Roughriders of the American Arena League (AAL), Gulf Coast Fire of the A-League, Orlando Predators of the National Arena League (NAL), and the Iowa Rampage of the Arena Football League.

== Early life ==
Cato attended Miami Central High School in West Little River, Florida. During his career he passed for 9,412 yards with 103 touchdowns and 23 interceptions. He also holds numerous Miami-Dade County passing records.

== College career ==
As a freshman in 2011, Cato completed 182 of 304 passes for 2,059 yards with 15 touchdowns and 11 interceptions.

As a sophomore in 2012, leading the nation in passing yards per game, he completed 406 of 584 passes for 4,201 yards with 37 touchdowns and 11 interceptions. With an outstanding season he won the Conference USA MVP.

His 2013 season held much promise with Cato being placed on the 2013 Players to Watch by The Touchdown Club of Columbus, and early on was already in the running of the 2013 Sammy Baugh award. Cato was also on the 2013 Maxwell Award watch list along with the Manning Award watch list. He ended the 2013 season with 39 touchdown passes, matching Chad Pennington's Marshall record for touchdown passes in a single season. Cato was named MVP in the 2013 Military Bowl victory over Maryland.

Cato returned as the starter his senior season in 2014. On October 18, 2014, Cato threw a touchdown pass in his 39th consecutive game, breaking Russell Wilson's FBS record for most consecutive games with at least one touchdown pass. He finished the season with 3,903 yards, 40 touchdowns and 13 interceptions.

Cato finished his career with a school record 14,079 passing yards and 131 passing touchdowns.

=== Career statistics ===
Year	Team	Games			Passing								Rushing			
Year	Team	GP	GS	Record	Comp	Att	Pct	Yards	Avg	TD	Int	Rate	Att	Yards	Avg	TD
2011	Marshall	13	10	5−5	182	304	59.9	2,059	6.8	15	11	125.8	57	32	0.6	0
2012	Marshall	12	12	5−7	406	584	69.5	4,201	7.2	37	11	147.1	57	31	0.5	1
2013	Marshall	14	14	10−4	298	499	59.7	3,916	7.8	39	9	147.8	99	294	3.0	6
2014	Marshall	14	14	13−1	267	451	59.2	3,903	8.9	40	13	155.4	94	482	5.1	8
Totals		53	50	33−17	1,153	1,838	62.7	14,079	7.7	131	44	145.8	307	839	2.7	15

== Professional career ==
=== Pre-draft ===
A February 2015 draft ranking by Mel Kiper, Jr. rated him as the eighth best quarterback in the 2015 NFL draft. NFLDraftScout.com rated him the 30th best quarterback in the draft. Some thought that Cato's size would hurt his draft chances.

Pre-draft measurables
Height	Weight	40-yard dash	10-yard split	20-yard split	Vertical jump	Broad jump
6 ft 0 1/2 in (1.84 m)	178 lb (81 kg)	4.71 s	1.64 s	2.75 s	34 in (0.86 m)	9 ft 5 in (2.87 m)
All values from Marshall Pro Day

Despite an impressive college career, Cato went undrafted during the 2015 draft. On May 7, Cato was invited to a camp tryout with the Cleveland Browns of the NFL but was not signed.

=== Montreal Alouettes ===
On May 16, 2015, Cato signed a two-year deal with the CFL's Montreal Alouettes. He started his first game for the Alouettes on July 3 against the Calgary Stampeders after Jonathan Crompton and Dan LeFevour sustained injuries in Week 1 against the Ottawa Redblacks. He threw a touchdown pass on his first drive as an Alouette. In the first half, Cato went 12–15 for 146 yards and 2 touchdowns. He continued in the second half with another touchdown scoring opening drive. Cato finished the game 20–25, 241 yards and 3 touchdowns for his first CFL win. For his efforts, Cato was named player of the game, with TSN analyst and Canadian Football Hall of Fame quarterback Matt Dunigan characterizing his performance as "phenomenal." He was named Player of the Week by the league for his performance against Calgary. Cato was one of three players chosen as Player of the Month for July in the CFL. Cato played in 12 games in 2015 for the Alouettes, completing 174 out of 215 pass attempts (80%) with 9 touchdowns and 9 interceptions.

Cato began the 2016 season as the number two quarterback on the depth chart behind veteran Kevin Glenn. Through the first half of the season the Alouettes only won 3 games, which prompted head coach Jim Popp to declare Cato as the starting quarterback for their Week 12 matchup against the BC Lions. In his first practice as the starting QB Cato and wide receiver Duron Carter got into a heated argument. A little over a week later Cato once again got into a heated argument at practice with Carter, this time also involving wide receiver Kenny Stafford. He was released by the Alouettes on February 6, 2017.

=== Richmond Roughriders ===
Cato signed with the Richmond Roughriders of the American Arena League in November 2017. After one game, Cato was cut from the team on March 27, 2018.

=== Gulf Coast Fire ===
On April 8, 2019 Cato signed with the Gulf Coast Fire of the A-League. He led the Gulf Coast Fire to an undefeated season and the inaugural A-League Championship.

=== Orlando Predators ===
On December 23, 2019 it was revealed that Cato had signed with the Orlando Predators of the National Arena League. The National Arena League cancelled the 2020 season due to the COVID-19 pandemic. On October 1, 2020, Cato re-signed with the Predators for the 2021 season. However, on May 27, 2021, Cato refused to report to the Predators and didn't play a game for them in the 2021 season. On December 5, Cato re-signed with the Predators for the 2022 season. On July 13, 2022, Cato was released by the Predators.

=== Fayetteville Mustangs ===
On November 6, 2022, Cato signed with the Fayetteville Mustangs of the National Arena League (NAL) for the 2023 season.

=== Orlando Predators (second stint) ===
On June 30, 2023, Cato signed with the Orlando Predators of the National Arena League (NAL) for his second stint with the team. On August 9, Cato was indefinitely suspended by the NAL.

=== Iowa Rampage ===
On April 4, 2024, Cato signed with the Iowa Rampage of the Arena Football League. The Rampage played two games before discontinuing operations.

=== Kansas City Goats ===
On May 13, 2024, Cato signed with the Kansas City Goats of The Arena League.

=== Salina Liberty ===
On April 14, 2025, Cato signed with the Salina Liberty of Arena Football One, where he was immediately implemented as the team's starting quarterback.

== CFL career statistics ==
Year	Team	GP	Passing							Rushing				
Year	Team	GP	Cmp	Att	Pct	Yds	TD	Int	Rtg	Att	Yds	Avg	Lng	TD
2015	MTL	12	174	251	69.3	2,167	9	9	92.8	26	160	6.2	19	1
2016	MTL	18	122	181	67.4	1,398	8	2	100.7	18	159	8.8	73	0
Total		30	296	432	68.6	3,570	17	11	96.1	44	334	7.4	73	1

== Personal life ==
Cato was raised in Liberty City, a neighborhood in Miami, Florida, by his mother Juannese, who worked two jobs to take care of her seven children. When Cato was thirteen, his mother died suddenly of pneumonia and his eighteen-year-old sister Shanrikia was granted custody of Cato and four other siblings. During his college career, Cato's father was released from prison, allowing Cato to meet him for the first time. Cato is a father of two young girls.

== See also ==
- List of Division I FBS passing yardage leaders
- List of Division I FBS passing touchdown leaders
