= Antonio Brown =

American football player (born 1988)

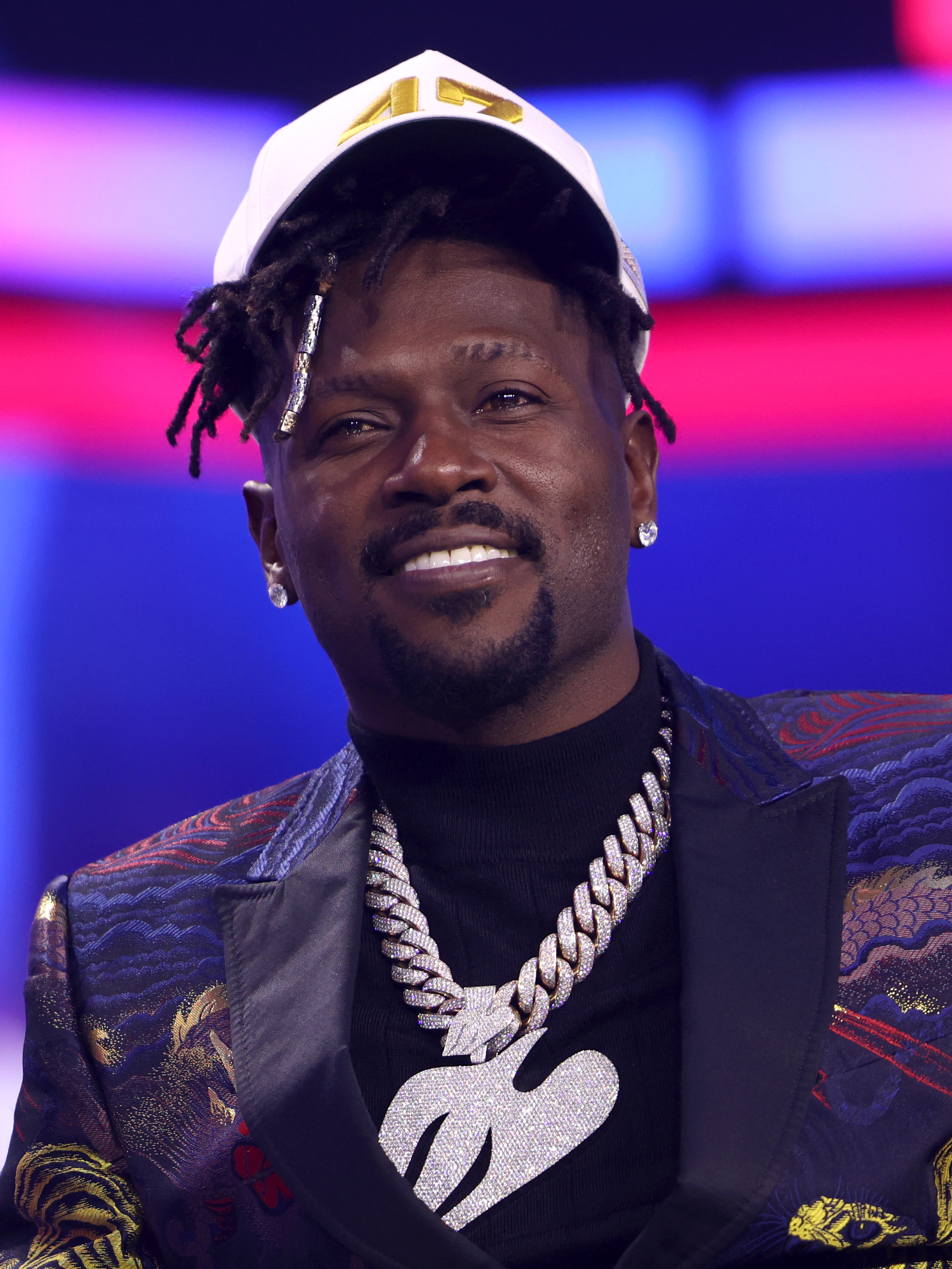
- Brown in 2024

No. 84, 17, 81
- Position: Wide receiver

Personal information
- Born: July 10, 1988 (age 38); Miami, Florida, U.S.
- Listed height: 5 ft 10 in (1.78 m)
- Listed weight: 185 lb (84 kg)

Career information
- High school: Miami Norland (Miami Gardens, Florida)
- College: Central Michigan (2007–2009)
- NFL draft: 2010: 6th round, 195th overall pick

Career history

Playing
- Pittsburgh Steelers (2010–2018); Oakland Raiders (2019)*; New England Patriots (2019); Tampa Bay Buccaneers (2020–2021)
- * Offseason or practice squad member only

Operations
- Albany Empire (2023) Co-owner

Awards and highlights
- Super Bowl champion (LV); 4× First-team All-Pro (2014–2017); Second-team All-Pro (2013); 7× Pro Bowl (2011, 2013–2018); 2× NFL receptions leader (2014, 2015); 2× NFL receiving yards leader (2014, 2017); NFL receiving touchdowns leader (2018); NFL 2010s All-Decade Team; 2× First-team All-American (2008, 2009); NCAA average punt return yards leader (2008); 2× MAC Special Teams Player of the Year (2008, 2009); MAC Freshman of the Year (2007); 2× First-team All-MAC (2008, 2009); Second-team All-MAC (2007)

Career NFL statistics
- Receptions: 928
- Receiving yards: 12,291
- Receiving touchdowns: 83
- Return yards: 2,934
- Return touchdowns: 5
- Stats at Pro Football Reference

Antonio Tavaris Brown Sr. (born July 10, 1988), known by his initials "AB", is an American former professional football wide receiver who played in the National Football League (NFL) for 12 seasons. During his first nine seasons with the Pittsburgh Steelers, Brown became regarded as one of the greatest receivers of his era, but his career was also marked by various controversies.

Brown played college football for the Central Michigan Chippewas, earning first-team All-American honors as a punt returner and winning MAC Special Teams Player of the Year twice between 2008 and 2009. He was selected by the Steelers in the sixth round of the 2010 NFL draft. With Pittsburgh, Brown led the league twice in receiving yards, twice in receptions, and once in receiving touchdowns. He also earned seven Pro Bowl selections, including six consecutive, and four consecutive first-team All-Pro selections.

Amid conflict with the Steelers, Brown was traded to the Oakland Raiders in 2019, but was released ahead of the season due to several off-the-field incidents. He later signed with the New England Patriots, appearing in one game before being released amid a sexual assault investigation. Brown returned to the NFL midway through the 2020 season with the Tampa Bay Buccaneers, where he was a member of the team that won Super Bowl LV. He was released near the end of the following season after leaving the field during a game.

Following the end of his playing career, Brown was the majority owner of the Albany Empire of the National Arena League (NAL) in 2023, a tenure that saw the team fold the same year.

== Early life ==
Brown is the son of "Touchdown" Eddie Brown and Adrianne Moss. Brown's father played as a wide receiver for the Albany Firebirds in the Arena Football League, and was named the best player in the league's history in 2006.

Brown attended Miami Norland High School in Miami, Florida, where he played football. In football, Brown played running back, quarterback, wide receiver, and punt returner for the Vikings. He was a two-time Class 6A all-state selection and was also named North Athlete of the Year at 2005 Miami-Dade Gridiron Classic. Coming out of high school, Brown applied to Florida State University. His admission was denied over academic concerns.

After attempting to attend Alcorn State University, he decided to enroll at North Carolina Tech Prep. Playing in just five games at quarterback, Brown passed for 1,247 yards and 11 touchdowns, while rushing for 451 yards and 13 touchdowns. Once he finished his lone season at North Carolina Tech Prep, he received a scholarship to play at Florida International University, but he was expelled before the season for an altercation with security. Brown then began reaching out to wide receivers coach Butch Jones at West Virginia University, since he had been highly recruited by him. After learning that Jones had left West Virginia to become the head coach at Central Michigan University, Brown enrolled at the school and started his college football career as a walk-on freshman.

== College career ==
Brown attended and played college football for the Central Michigan Chippewas from 2007 to 2009.

=== Freshman season ===
Brown began attending Central Michigan University in 2007 after wide receivers coach Zach Azzanni told him he could fly to Michigan and try out for the team as a walk-on wide receiver. Transitioning from the quarterback position in high school to wide receiver in college was not that difficult for him, and after a few weeks, Central Michigan coaches offered him a scholarship. Brown had difficulty adjusting to the college lifestyle, and being on time for meetings and practice. Azzanni and his wife helped him get situated and into an established routine, and he soon became like a part of their family. He made his collegiate debut against the Kansas Jayhawks on September 1. He had four receptions for 23 receiving yards in the 52–7 loss. In the next week's game against the Toledo Rockets, he had nine receptions for 105 receiving yards and his first collegiate touchdown, a six-yard pass from Dan LeFevour, in the 52–31 victory. On October 6, against the Ball State Cardinals, he had six receptions for 43 receiving yards and a receiving touchdown to go along with a nine-yard rushing touchdown in the 58–38 victory. On November 23, against the Akron Zips, he had 15 receptions for 174 yards in the 35–32 victory. The Chippewas finished with an 8–5 record, won the MAC, and qualified for a bowl game. In the 2007 Motor City Bowl against the Purdue Boilermakers, he had four receptions for 94 receiving yards and a receiving touchdown in the 51–48 loss. During his first season at Central Michigan, Brown played in 14 games. He played well enough to win the Mid-American Conference Freshman of the Year and was All-Conference as a returner. For his freshman season, he had 102 receptions for 1,003 yards and six touchdowns. His 102 receptions led the Mid-American Conference in 2007.

=== Sophomore season ===
Brown started every game during his sophomore season in 2008. In the third game of the season, against the Ohio Bobcats, he had 10 receptions for 78 receiving yards to go along with a 75-yard punt return for a touchdown in the 31–28 victory. On October 11, against the Temple Owls, he had three receptions for 33 yards and a season-high two touchdown receptions. The next week, against the Western Michigan Broncos, he had 10 receptions for 113 yards and threw a two-yard touchdown pass in the third quarter of the 38–28 victory. On November 1, against the Indiana Hoosiers, he had seven receptions for 138 receiving yards and two receiving touchdowns in the 37–34 victory. On November 28, while playing at the Eastern Michigan Eagles, he had seven receptions for a season-high 172 yards and a touchdown. The Chippewas finished with an 8–4 record and qualified for the 2008 Motor City Bowl. In the bowl game against the FAU Owls, he had 11 receptions for 92 receiving yards in the 24–21 loss. For the season, Brown hauled in 93 receptions for 998 yards and seven touchdowns. He led the conference with 410 punt return yards and 791 kick return yards, and he also led the nation with an average of 20.5 yards per punt return.

=== Junior season ===
After a slow start to the season in a 19–6 loss against the Arizona Wildcats, Brown had ten receptions for 71 receiving yards and a receiving touchdown against the Michigan State Spartans. In addition, he completed a 24-yard pass and recorded 150 net kickoff return yards in the 29–27 victory for the Chippewas first triumph over the Spartans since 1992. In the season's third game against the Alcorn State Braves, he had a 55-yard punt return for a touchdown in the first quarter of the 48–0 victory. Against the Akron Zips on September 26, 2009, Brown had nine receptions for 89 receiving yards and a season-high two receiving touchdowns in the 48–21 victory. On October 3, against the Buffalo Bulls, he had six receptions for 112 receiving yards and a receiving touchdown in the 20–13 victory. In the next game, against the Eastern Michigan Eagles, he had four receptions for 110 receiving yards and one receiving touchdown in the 56–8 victory. Over the next two games, both victories over the Western Michigan Broncos and the Bowling Green Falcons, he recorded his fourth and fifth consecutive game with a receiving touchdown. On November 11, he had 13 receptions for 129 receiving yards and one receiving touchdown in the 56–28 victory over the Toledo Rockets. In the following game against the Ball State Cardinals, he had 11 receptions for 170 receiving yards and a receiving touchdown in the 35–3 victory. In the MAC Championship against the Ohio Bobcats, he had eight receptions for 66 receiving yards in the 20–10 victory.

In his last collegiate game on January 6, 2010, against the Troy Trojans in the GMAC Bowl, Brown had a season-high 13 receptions for 178 yards in the 44–41 victory. He finished 2009 with single-season bests of 110 receptions (also a school record), 1,198 receiving yards, and nine touchdowns. Brown contributed to a historic season for Central Michigan. The team set a school record for wins with 12. For his career at Central Michigan, he had a school-record 305 receptions, (including the top three seasons with the most receptions in school history), 3,199 receiving yards (fourth all-time), and 22 touchdowns (third all-time). On January 7, he announced he would forgo his senior season and enter the 2010 NFL draft.

== Professional career ==
=== Pre-draft ===
After Brown entered the 2010 NFL draft, the majority of analysts and scouts projected him to be a fifth or sixth round draft selection. He was ranked as the 37th best wide receiver by NFLDraftScout.com and was invited to the NFL Combine, where he completed the entire workout and all the positional drills. Brown participated at Central Michigan's Pro Day and decided to try to improve on his 10, 20, and 40-yard dash times after being unsatisfied with the numbers he clocked at the combine. He was able to improve his time in all three categories.

Pre-draft measurables
Height	Weight	Arm length	Hand span	40-yard dash	10-yard split	20-yard split	20-yard shuttle	Three-cone drill	Vertical jump	Broad jump	Bench press
5 ft 10 1/8 in (1.78 m)	186 lb (84 kg)	31 in (0.79 m)	9 in (0.23 m)	4.48 s	1.50 s	2.56 s	4.18 s	6.98 s	33.5 in (0.85 m)	8 ft 9 in (2.67 m)	13 reps
All results from the 2010 NFL Combine/Pro Day

=== Pittsburgh Steelers ===
==== 2010 season ====
Using a pick received in a trade with the Arizona Cardinals, the Pittsburgh Steelers selected him in the sixth round with the 195th overall pick in the 2010 NFL draft. He was the 22nd of 27 wide receivers selected in the draft, and the second by the Pittsburgh Steelers behind Emmanuel Sanders. He picked the jersey number 84, which he explained: "Eight times four is 32. Thirty-two teams looked past me, even the Steelers. So every time I go out there it's a little added motivation."

On June 15, 2010, the Steelers signed Brown to a three-year, $1.28 million contract with a signing bonus of $73,075.

Brown entered training camp competing with Sanders, Tyler Grisham, Stefan Logan, Isaiah Williams, and Brandon Logan to be the Steelers' backup wide receivers. Brown was named the Steelers' fifth wide receiver on their depth chart, behind veterans Hines Ward, Mike Wallace, Antwaan Randle El, and Arnaz Battle.

On September 19, Brown made his NFL debut against the Tennessee Titans and returned two kickoffs and a punt for 128 yards, including an 89-yard touchdown from a reverse on the first play of the game, in the 19–11 victory. He became the first player since Steve Smith for the Carolina Panthers in 2001 to record a kickoff return touchdown in his first career game. On October 3, Brown made his first NFL catch for a six-yard gain during a 17–14 loss to the Baltimore Ravens in Week 4. During the regular-season finale against the Cleveland Browns, Brown made a season-high four catches for 52 yards in a 41–9 victory. He finished his rookie season with 16 receptions for 167 yards in ten games.

The Steelers finished the 2010 season atop the AFC North and earned the #2-seed with a 12–4 record. On January 15, 2011, Brown appeared in his first postseason game and caught a 58-yard pass from Ben Roethlisberger to set up the game-winning touchdown. He finished his first playoff game with a season-high 75 yards on three receptions as the Steelers defeated the Ravens in the AFC Divisional Round by a score of 31–24. The following week in the AFC Championship against the New York Jets, at the two-minute warning, Brown caught a 14-yard pass on 3rd & 6, sealing the 24–19 victory for the Steelers and advancing them to Super Bowl XLV. In his first Super Bowl, Brown handled four kickoff returns, four punt returns, and finished with one catch for one yard in the 31–25 loss to the Green Bay Packers.

==== 2011 season ====
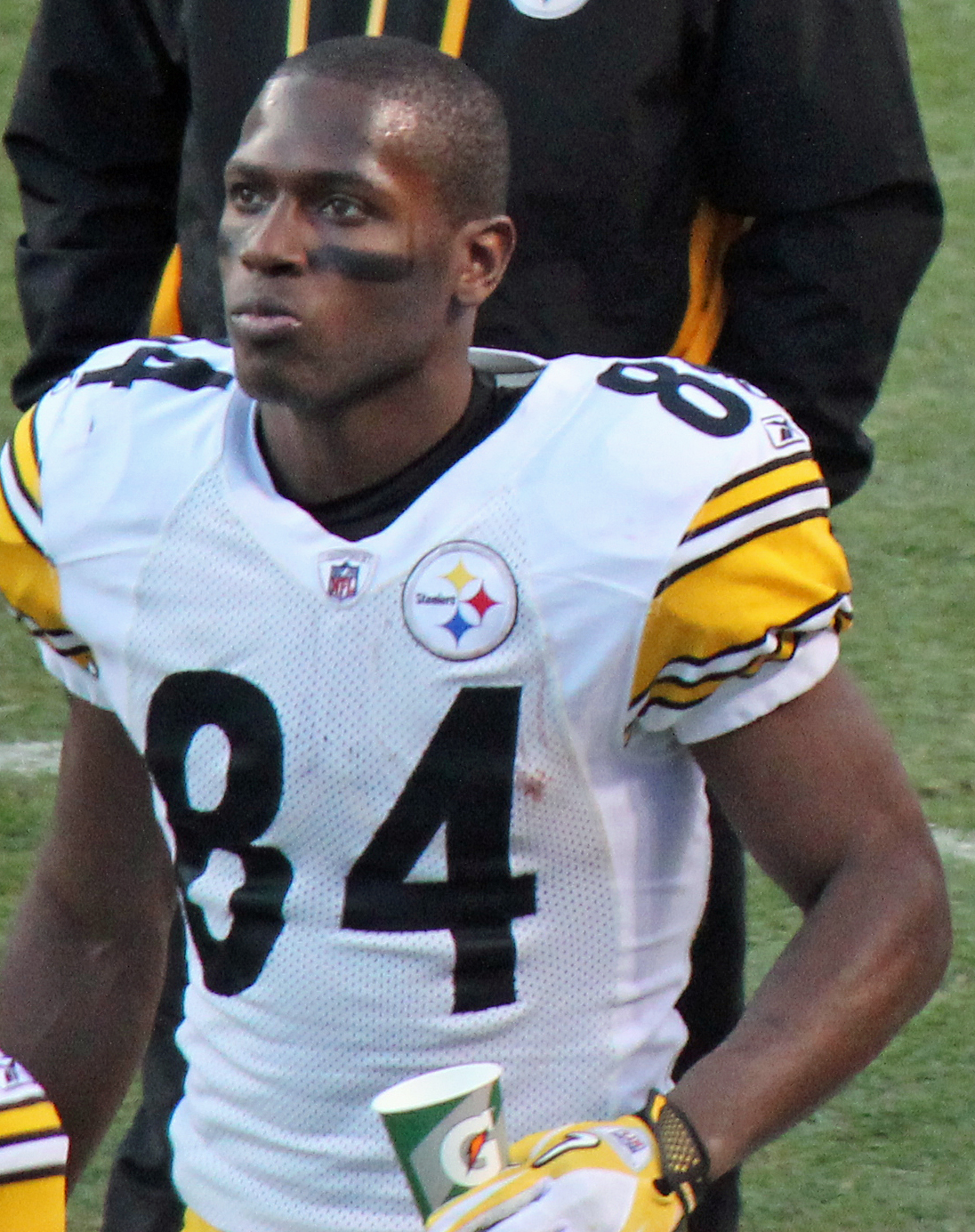
Brown in Denver in January 2012

Brown entered training camp competing with Emmanuel Sanders, Arnaz Battle, Limas Sweed, and Jerricho Cotchery to be the Steelers' third wide receiver after the departure of Antwaan Randle El. He won the competition and was named the third wide receiver on the depth chart behind Hines Ward and Mike Wallace. Brown was also named the starting kick returner and punt returner.

Brown made his first appearance of the season in the season-opener against the Baltimore Ravens and finished with two receptions for 14 yards and had three kickoff returns for 34 yards in a 35–7 loss. In Week 7, against the Arizona Cardinals, he had seven receptions for 102 receiving yards, marking his first career game with over 100 receiving yards, in the 32–20 victory. On October 30, in Week 8, Brown had a season-high nine receptions for 67 yards and caught his first career touchdown reception on a seven-yard pass from Ben Roethlisberger in a 25–17 victory over the New England Patriots. The next game, he caught five passes for 109 yards in a 23–20 loss to the Ravens. On November 13, he earned his first career start and made five receptions for 86 yards in a 24–17 defeat of the Cincinnati Bengals. On December 4, he returned a punt for a 60-yard touchdown and made two catches for 67 yards, as the Steelers routed the Bengals 35–7. The punt return for a touchdown was the first in his career and Brown was named AFC Special Teams Player of the Week for his performance. In a Week 14 win over the Cleveland Browns, he made his second start of the season and ended the game with five catches for a season-high 151 yards and scored a season-long 79-yard touchdown in a 14–3 victory. Brown finished the season with 69 receptions for 1,108 yards and two touchdown receptions in 16 games and three starts.

The Steelers finished 12–4 and received a playoff berth. On January 8, 2012, Brown caught five passes for 70 yards and had one carry for 18 yards in a 29–23 overtime loss to the Denver Broncos in the AFC Wild Card Round.

Brown became the first player in NFL history to have more than 1,000 yards receiving and returning in the same year. For his efforts, Brown was selected as a punt returner for the 2012 Pro Bowl. In his first Pro Bowl, Brown caught two passes for 15 yards, helping the AFC defeat the NFC 59–41.

==== 2012 season ====
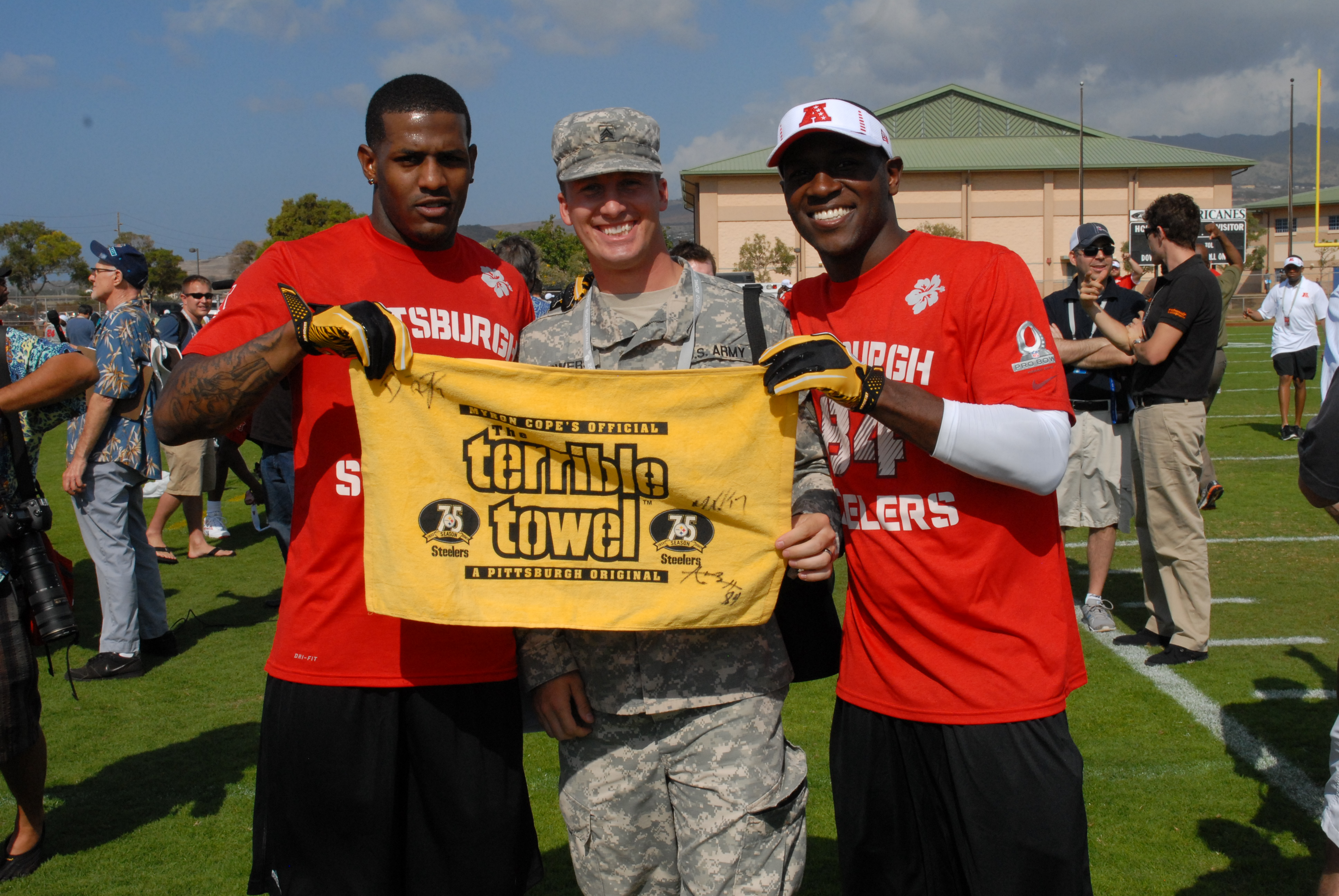
Mike Wallace and Brown at the Pro Bowl in 2012

On July 28, 2012, the Steelers signed Brown to a five-year, $42.5 million extension that included an $8.5 million signing bonus.

With the retirement of Hines Ward during the offseason, Brown entered training camp competing with Mike Wallace and Emmanuel Sanders to be the starting wide receivers. Brown and Wallace were subsequently named the starters at the position to begin the regular season. In December 2018, former Steelers safety Ryan Clark claimed that during a practice in 2012, Brown started shouting at defensive coordinator Dick LeBeau and began yelling at players on the defense, saying, "Don't touch me. I'm the franchise."

In the Steelers' season opener against the Denver Broncos, Brown finished the 31–19 loss with four receptions for 74 yards. On September 23, he had seven receptions for 87 yards and a touchdown in the 34–31 loss to the Oakland Raiders in Week 3.

On November 4, Brown was fined $10,000 by the NFL for unsportsmanlike conduct when he ran backwards for the final 20 yards of a punt return touchdown the previous week against the Washington Redskins. The following game against the New York Giants, Brown suffered a high ankle sprain and had to leave. The ankle injury prevented him from appearing in the next three games. During Week 15 against the Dallas Cowboys, Brown made a season-high eight catches for 76 yards and a touchdown in a 27–24 loss. The following week, Brown caught five passes for a season-high 97 yards and scored a 60-yard touchdown in a 13–10 loss to the Cincinnati Bengals. He finished the 2012 season with 66 receptions for 787 yards and five touchdowns in 13 games and ten starts.

==== 2013 season ====
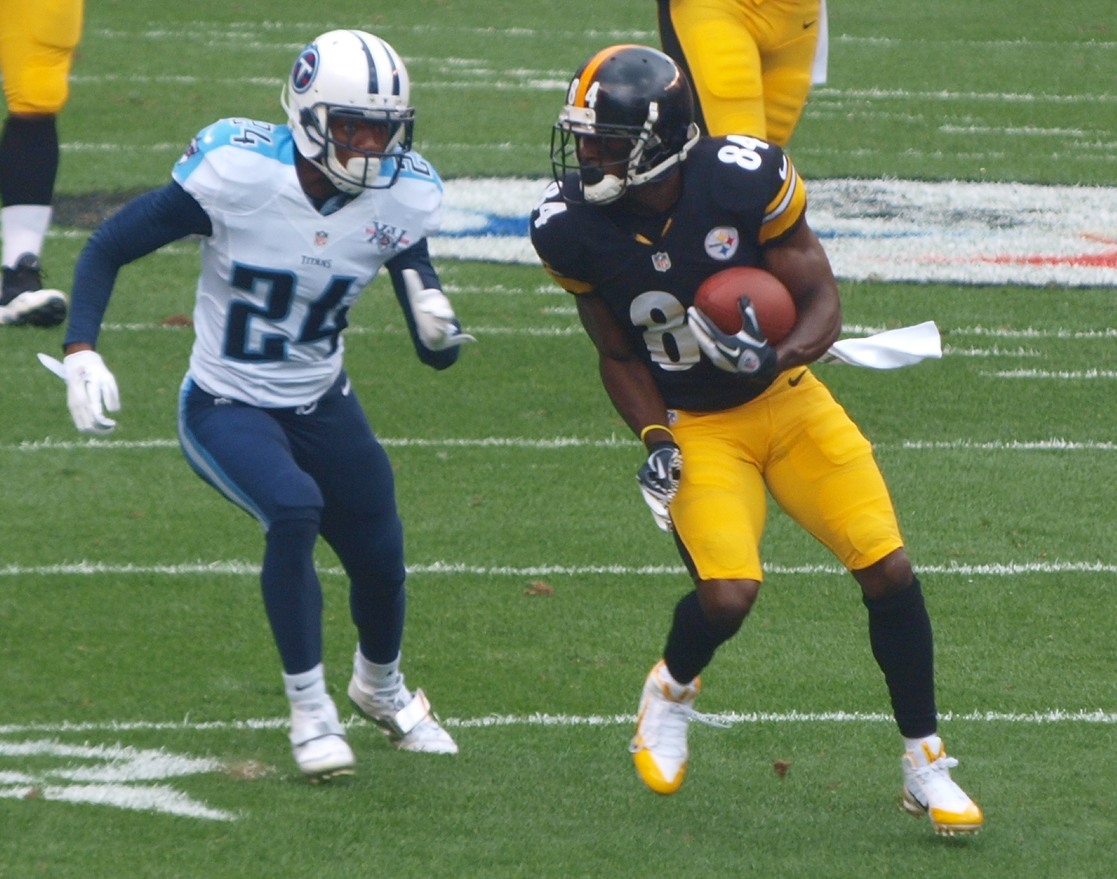
Brown being pursued by cornerback Coty Sensabaugh in a 2013 game against the Tennessee Titans

Brown entered the 2013 regular season as one of the Steelers' starting wide receivers with Emmanuel Sanders.

Brown started in the season opener against the Tennessee Titans and had five receptions for 71 yards in a 16–9 loss. On September 22, he caught nine passes for a season-high and then career-high 196 yards and two touchdowns in a 40–23 loss to the Chicago Bears. The following game, Brown caught a season-high 12 passes for 88 yards in a 34–27 loss to the Minnesota Vikings. In Week 11, against the Detroit Lions, he had seven receptions for 142 receiving yards and two receiving touchdowns in the 37–27 victory. In a Week 14 matchup against the Miami Dolphins, the Steelers were trailing 28–34, when they attempted a series of laterals on the final play of the game. The ball was eventually tossed to Brown, who raced up the sideline for what appeared to be the game-tying touchdown until referees announced he had stepped out of bounds at the 13-yard line with no time left. He finished the game with five receptions for 138 yards.

On December 22, in Week 16, Brown broke Yancey Thigpen's single-season team record of 1,398 receiving yards set in 1997. Brown became the second player in franchise history to amass at least 100 receptions in a season, joining former teammate Hines Ward. On December 29, he, along with Pierre Garçon of the Washington Redskins, tied Jimmy Smith as the only players to record at least five receptions in every game of an NFL season. In addition, Brown became the only receiver in NFL history to record five receptions and at least 50 yards in every game of an NFL season.

Brown finished the 2013 season with 110 receptions for 1,499 yards and eight touchdowns. On December 27, 2013, Brown was selected for the Pro Bowl as a receiver and a punt returner. On January 3, 2014, Brown was named to the AP All-Pro team for the first time in his career. He was ranked 23rd by his fellow players on the NFL Top 100 Players of 2014.

==== 2014 season ====
In the season-opener against the Cleveland Browns, while returning a punt, Brown attempted to hurdle Browns punter Spencer Lanning and kicked him in the facemask, garnering significant media attention as well as a 15-yard unsportsmanlike conduct penalty. He finished the narrow 30–27 victory with five receptions for 116 yards and a touchdown. He later apologized for the kick, calling it an accident. Brown was fined $8,200 for the kick. On October 20 against the Houston Texans, Brown threw his first NFL touchdown pass, a three-yard pass to wide receiver Lance Moore, in a 30–23 victory on Monday Night Football. The following game, Brown caught ten passes for 133 yards and two touchdowns in a 51–34 victory over the Indianapolis Colts. During Week 9 against the Baltimore Ravens, Brown made a season-high 11 catches for a season-high 144 yards, including a 54-yard touchdown reception. In Week 13, against the New Orleans Saints, he had eight receptions for 97 receiving yards and two receiving touchdowns in the 35–32 loss. In Week 14 against the Cincinnati Bengals, he had nine receptions for 117 receiving yards in the 42–21 victory. In the following game against the Atlanta Falcons, he had ten receptions for 123 receiving yards in the 27–20 victory. In the regular-season finale, the second divisional matchup against the Cincinnati Bengals, he had seven receptions for 128 yards and a touchdown to go along with a 71-yard punt return touchdown. His successful performance earned him AFC Special Teams Player of the Week.

In 2014, Brown led the NFL in receptions (129), receiving yards (1,698), and was tied for second in touchdowns (13); all three were new team records. He became the first Steeler to lead the league in receiving yards since Roy Jefferson in 1968. The Steelers made the playoffs and faced off against the Ravens in the Wild Card Round. In the 30–17 loss, he had nine receptions for 117 yards. His successful season garnered him a third Pro Bowl selection. He was ranked eighth by his fellow players on the NFL Top 100 Players of 2015.

==== 2015 season ====
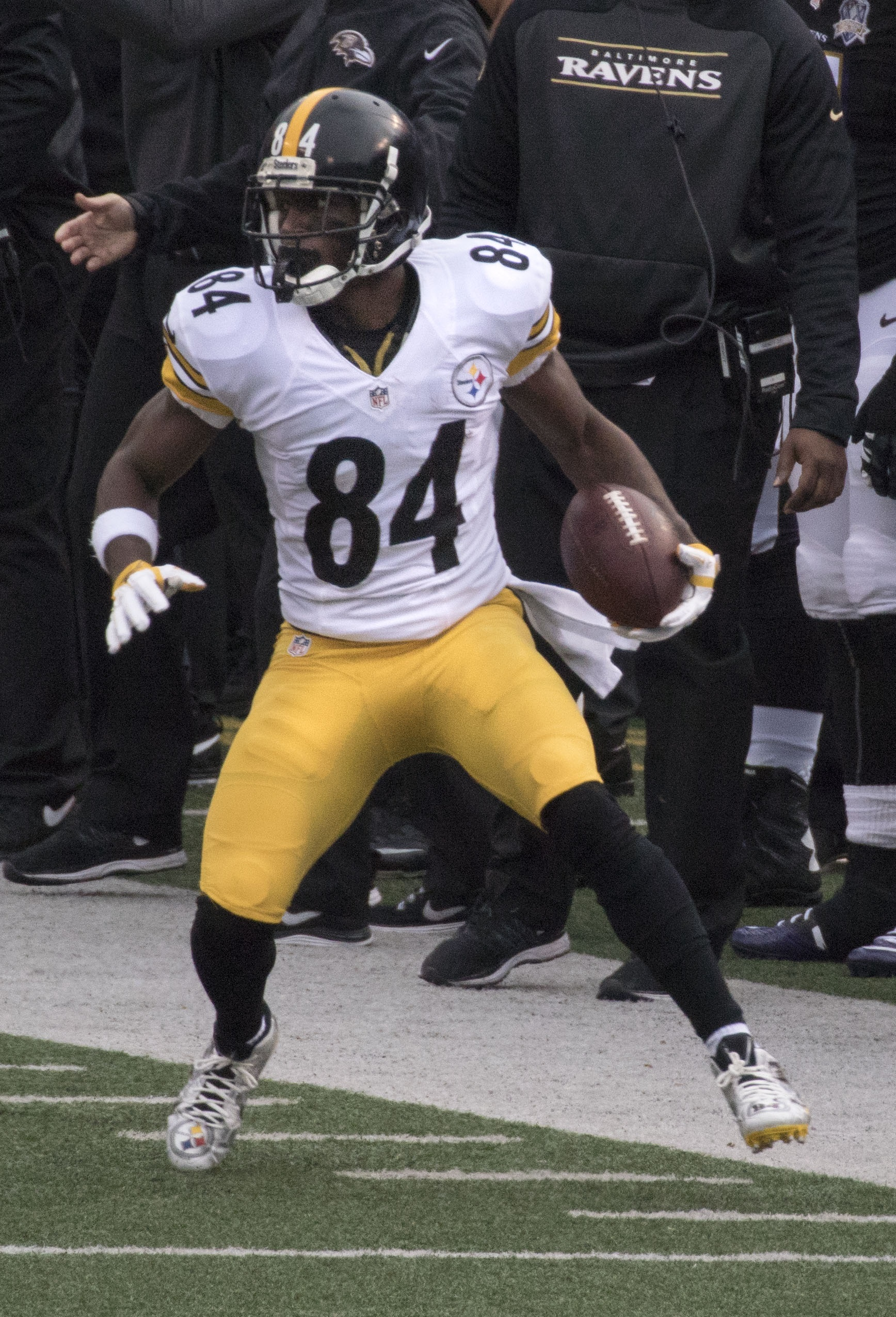
Brown with the Pittsburgh Steelers in 2015

Brown started in the season-opening 28–21 loss to the New England Patriots and caught nine passes for 133 yards and a touchdown. The following week, he had nine receptions for 195 yards and a touchdown in the 43–18 victory over the San Francisco 49ers. This brought his career total to 5,587 yards, good for 200th on the NFL's all-time receiving yards list and surpassing Steelers' legend Lynn Swann. On November 8, Brown caught a career-high 17 passes for a career-high 284 yards in a narrow 38–35 victory over the Oakland Raiders. His 284 receiving yards broke Keenan McCardell's mark of 232 for the Jacksonville Jaguars in 1996 for most receiving yards in a game without a receiving touchdown. On December 6, he caught eight passes for 118 yards and two touchdowns in a 45–10 victory over the Indianapolis Colts in. This game is particularly notable for a play in which Brown returned a punt for a touchdown and proceeded to leap onto the goalpost. He was flagged on the play for excessive celebration. On December 9, Brown was fined $11,576 by the NFL for the incident. For his efforts against the Colts, he earned his third career AFC Special Teams Player of the Week Award. In a week 15 34–27 victory over the Denver Broncos, he caught 16 passes for 189 yards and two touchdowns. For his performance against the Broncos, he was named the AFC Offensive Player of the Week. On January 3, Brown caught 13 passes for 187 yards and a touchdown in a 28–12 win over the Cleveland Browns in the regular season finale.

He finished the regular season with a league-high 136 receptions for 1,834 yards and 10 touchdowns – the first two marks surpassing his own team records of 129 catches and 1,698 yards. He set the record for most receptions in a two-year span with 265 from 2014 to 2015; and most receptions in a three-year span with 375 from 2013 to 2015. With his 16 receptions against the Browns, Brown became the first receiver to have two games with at least 16 catches in a single season, and his four games of at least 175 yards in a season set a new NFL record.

The Steelers opened postseason play with a Wild Card game against the Cincinnati Bengals. Late in the fourth quarter, Brown left the contest with a concussion after taking a hit from Bengals linebacker Vontaze Burfict. The Steelers went on to win the game by a score of 18–16. The injury kept Brown out of the Steelers' next game in the Divisional Round, where they lost 23–16 to the eventual Super Bowl 50 champion Denver Broncos.

Brown was named to his third consecutive and fourth career Pro Bowl, his second first-team All-Pro, and was ranked as the top wide receiver and the fourth best player on the NFL Top 100 Players of 2016.

==== 2016 season ====
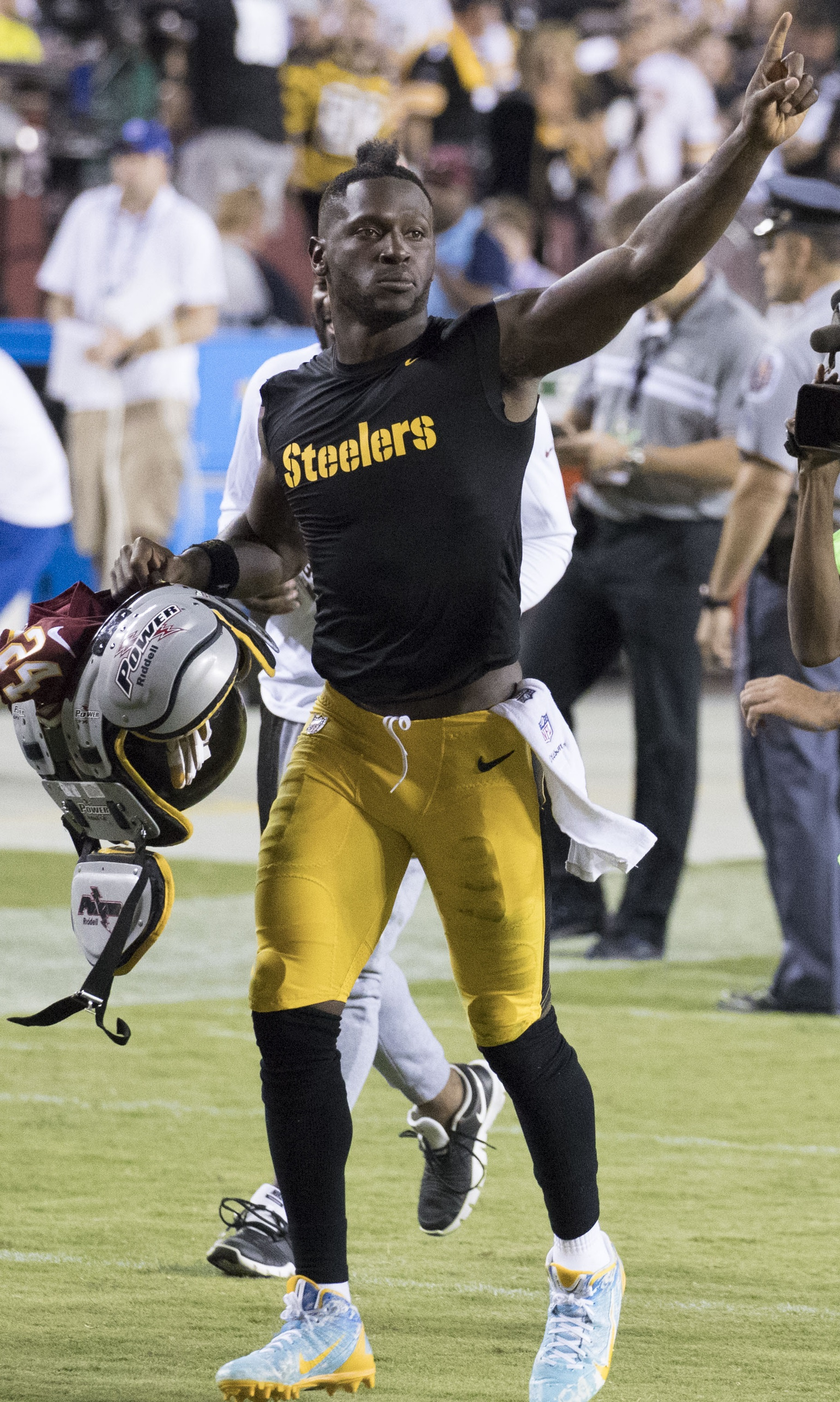
Brown after a game against the Washington Redskins in 2016

Brown started in the season opener against the Washington Redskins on Monday Night Football and finished the 38–16 victory with eight receptions for 126 yards and two touchdowns. After the game, the NFL fined him a combined $15,191 for wearing baby blue cleats, which violated the league's uniform policy, and for twerking after scoring his second touchdown. After performing a similar dance in the end zone in Week 4 against the Kansas City Chiefs, Brown was fined $24,309. The second fine was largely criticized by sportswriters, who considered it much too steep a penalty for a celebration. The league reasoned that the dances were "sexually suggestive".

During Week 3 in a 34–3 loss to the Philadelphia Eagles, Brown moved into the NFL top 100 all-time for career receptions, and in Week 9 against the Baltimore Ravens, he joined the top 100 for career receiving yards. During Week 10, Brown caught a season-high 14 passes for a season-high 154 yards and a touchdown in a 35–30 loss to the Dallas Cowboys. Two weeks later, he finished with five receptions for 91 yards and a career-high three touchdown receptions, as the Steelers defeated the Indianapolis Colts on the road by a score of 28–7 on Thanksgiving.

Brown finished the regular season with 106 receptions (second in the NFL to Larry Fitzgerald) for 1,284 yards and 12 touchdowns in 15 games. The Steelers decided to sit him for the season finale against the Cleveland Browns, as they had already clinched a playoff berth. At the end of the 2016 regular season, Brown ranked second in career receptions and third in career receiving yards for the Steelers franchise, and 57th and 78th all-time among NFL players in those categories.

In the 2016 season, Brown posted his fourth consecutive and fifth career season with at least 1,000 receiving yards, earning him his fourth consecutive and fifth career Pro Bowl selection on December 20, 2016. He was named First-team All-Pro for the third consecutive time.

On January 8, 2017, Brown caught five passes for 124 yards and two touchdowns in a 30–12 victory over the Miami Dolphins in the AFC Wild Card Round game. His two touchdowns of 50 and 62 yards were the first time that a player had caught two 50+ yard touchdowns in a single post-season game since Randy Moss in 2001, the first time ever in the first quarter, (Note: Ricky Sanders is the only player to do so in the second quarter (in 1988), Wayne Millner is the only player in the third quarter (in 1938).) and the first time a Steeler had two receiving touchdowns in a Wild Card game. (Note: Brown is one of four Steelers with two receiving touchdowns in a playoff game. The 124 yards were also a Steeler record for a Wild Card game, and tied for fourth-best in any Pittsburgh playoff game.) In the Divisional Round, Brown caught six passes for 108 yards in an 18–16 road victory over the Kansas City Chiefs, becoming the third Steeler with four or more 100-yard receiving playoff games. (Note: The others are Hines Ward with four and John Stallworth with five. Brown also joined three other Steelers for the most 100-yard playoff games in a single postseason with two.) After the game, Brown broadcast the team's locker room celebration on Facebook Live in violation of NFL rules and despite the requests of teammates Ben Roethlisberger and Ramon Foster to "keep a low profile on social media". The broadcast included head coach Mike Tomlin speaking crudely about their championship round opponent, the New England Patriots, for which Tomlin later apologized and disciplined Brown. Brown had been paid $244,000 by Facebook before the season to "create content" for live channels. In the AFC Championship against the Patriots, Brown had seven receptions for 77 yards in the 36–17 road loss. For his accomplishments in the 2016 season, he was ranked fourth on the NFL Top 100 Players of 2017.

==== 2017 season ====
On February 27, 2017, Brown signed a new five-year contract with the Steelers through the 2021 season. The contract was a four-year extension worth $68 million ($19 million guaranteed at signing) with a $17 million annual salary, making Brown the highest paid wide receiver in the NFL.

In the season-opener against the Cleveland Browns, Brown recorded 182 receiving yards on 11 receptions as the Steelers won on the road by a score of 21–18. His 182 receiving yards led all NFL receivers for the season opening week. In addition, he caught all 11 of his targets, which marked a career-high in terms of receptions with a 100% completion rate. During a Week 4 26–9 road victory over the Baltimore Ravens, Brown became angry over not being thrown the ball by Ben Roethlisberger on an incomplete play, and was filmed throwing a Gatorade cooler and yelling at coaches. During Week 11 against the Tennessee Titans, Brown made a one-handed catch adjacent to his helmet in the end zone for a touchdown. Overall, he had 10 receptions for 144 yards and three touchdowns as the Steelers won 40–17. Brown joined John Stallworth as the only Steelers player with two career games with at least three receiving touchdowns. For his performance in Week 11, Brown was named AFC Offensive Player of the Week. In the next game against the Green Bay Packers, he had 169 receiving yards and two touchdowns, including two sideline receptions for 37 yards in the final 17 seconds to set up the game-winning field goal. Brown became the fifth player since the 1970 merger with four games with at least 150 receiving yards in the first 12 weeks of a season. Plagued with a minor toe injury, in Week 14 against the Ravens, Brown finished with a season-high 213 receiving yards on 11 receptions, helping the Steelers narrowly win 39–38 and clinch the AFC North title. His 213-yard performance marked the second time in his career with at least 200 receiving yards in a single game. During Week 15 against the New England Patriots, Brown left the game with a left calf injury, and was taken to the hospital. Shortly after the Steelers' 27–24 loss to the AFC East-clinching Patriots, it was revealed that Brown's left calf was partially torn, meaning that he would not play for the rest of the regular season, but would return during the playoffs. He returned in the Divisional Round of the playoffs, recording seven catches for 132 yards and two touchdowns as the Steelers lost to the Jacksonville Jaguars by a score of 45–42.

Brown finished the 2017 season with a league-leading 1,533 receiving yards. He became the first player in Steelers franchise history to lead the league in receiving yards twice. He finished fifth in the league with 101 receptions and tied for fourth in the league with nine touchdown receptions. He was named to his sixth Pro Bowl, and was named first-team All-Pro as a unanimous selection. He was ranked the second best player, as well as the best wide receiver, by his peers on the NFL Top 100 Players of 2018.

==== 2018 season ====
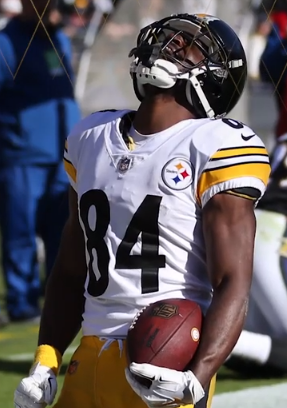
Brown in 2018

On July 18, 2018, Brown was announced as the cover athlete for Madden NFL 19.

In the season opener against the Cleveland Browns, Brown reached 10,000 career receiving yards. He achieved the milestone in 116 career games; only two NFL players have reached the mark in fewer games (Calvin Johnson in 115 games and Julio Jones in 104 games). Brown finished the 21–21 tie with nine catches for 93 yards and a touchdown. During Week 5 against the Atlanta Falcons, he had six catches for 101 yards and two touchdowns. In the next game against the Cincinnati Bengals, Brown had five catches for 105 yards and caught the game-winning touchdown with 10 seconds left in the fourth quarter. He was also a victim of a dirty hit from Vontaze Burfict in the game. During Week 11 against the Jacksonville Jaguars, Brown had five receptions for 117 yards and a touchdown in a narrow 20–16 road victory. Two weeks later, he had 10 receptions for 154 yards and a touchdown in a 33–30 loss against the Los Angeles Chargers. During Week 16 against the New Orleans Saints, Brown finished with 14 receptions 185 receiving yards and two touchdowns. He would then tie with Brandon Marshall for most seasons with 1,000 yards and 100 receptions in NFL history with 6. Overall, Brown finished the 2018 season with 104 receptions for 1,297 and a career-high 15 touchdowns. He was ranked 7th by his fellow players on the NFL Top 100 Players of 2019.

After allegedly getting into an argument with quarterback Ben Roethlisberger, then skipping practices leading up to the Week 17 game against the Bengals, Brown was benched for that game. Following the season, reports surfaced indicating Brown's dissatisfaction with his role on the Steelers, and he eventually requested a trade.

=== Oakland Raiders ===
On March 9, 2019, the Steelers agreed to trade Brown to the Oakland Raiders in exchange for a third and a fifth round selections in the 2019 NFL draft. The deal became official on March 13. Prior to the trade to Oakland, reports surfaced that the Steelers were "close to a deal" with the Buffalo Bills, but that the deal was canceled after Brown protested on social media.

In Brown's introductory press conference with the Raiders, he said "I'm here to elevate everything around me. I'm here to just be a surge of energy, of positivity, and good force. A great teammate and to bring out the best of everyone around me cause we all know it's not just about me." On August 3, Brown posted a picture of his heavily blistered feet on Instagram, which was later revealed to be frostbite to his feet due to not wearing proper footwear during a cryotherapy session. Brown's injury forced him to miss 10 out of 11 training camp practices with the Raiders.

On August 9, Brown filed a grievance to continue wearing his old helmet, even though it was discontinued and no longer approved by the NFL. He intended to retire from football if he had to wear a new helmet. Despite Brown's pleas to continue wearing his old helmet, an arbitrator denied his request. Brown eventually found a replacement for his old helmet, but it also did not meet the NFL's standards. Afterwards, he continued to not practice with the Raiders. Brown filed a second grievance regarding his helmet on August 19, which was also rejected. On September 4, Brown announced that he was using the Xenith Shadow helmet, which met the league's standards.

The same day Brown announced his helmet change, he was fined $54,000 by the Raiders organization for violating team rules, mainly due to unexcused absences and missing team practice sessions. Brown posted the letter informing him about his fine on Instagram, a move that was scrutinized around the league. The following day, Brown confronted Raiders general manager Mike Mayock and had a verbal altercation; Brown reportedly called Mayock a "cracker", which Brown later denied. It was also reported that Brown threatened to hit Mayock, and had to be held back by several teammates, including linebacker Vontaze Burfict. Afterwards, he punted a football and said to Mayock, "Fine me for that".

On September 6, Brown showed up at a Raiders team meeting and made an emotional apology for his actions. When head coach Jon Gruden was asked if Brown would play in Week 1 against the Denver Broncos, he replied, "That's the plan. Yes." Later that day, Brown read a 20-second statement that read, "I'm excited to be out here today. I apologized to my teammates and the organization. Enough talk, man. I'm excited to be out here with my teammates. I'm grateful for all the fans. I'm excited to be a part of the Raiders and see you guys soon." Less than a day later, Brown demanded his release from the Raiders after they voided the guaranteed money in his contract. Brown was released by the Raiders on September 7, just hours before his 2019 salary would have become guaranteed. Prior to his release, the Raiders fined Brown $215,000, for his altercation with Mayock.

=== New England Patriots ===
On September 7, 2019, the same day he was released by the Raiders, Brown agreed to a one-year contract with the New England Patriots worth up to $15 million, with a $9 million signing bonus. Additionally, on September 9, the Patriots added a second-year option in Brown's contract in which he would receive $20 million if picked up.

Despite allegations of sexual and personal misconduct levied against him, Brown practiced with the Patriots in preparation for his season debut in Week 2 against the Miami Dolphins. He officially made his Patriots debut in Week 2, catching four passes for 56 yards and a touchdown along with a 5-yard rush in a 43–0 road victory. On September 20, following further allegations, in addition to allegedly intimidating text messages sent to one of his accusers after going to New England, Brown was cut by the Patriots.

=== 2020 offseason ===
Brown posted on Twitter that he was retiring from the NFL on September 22, 2019, but changed his mind four days later. On July 20, 2020, he implied he was retiring again, but again expressed interest in playing a few days later. On July 31, Brown was suspended for the first eight weeks of the 2020 NFL season for multiple violations of the league's personal-conduct policy.

=== Tampa Bay Buccaneers ===
==== 2020 season ====
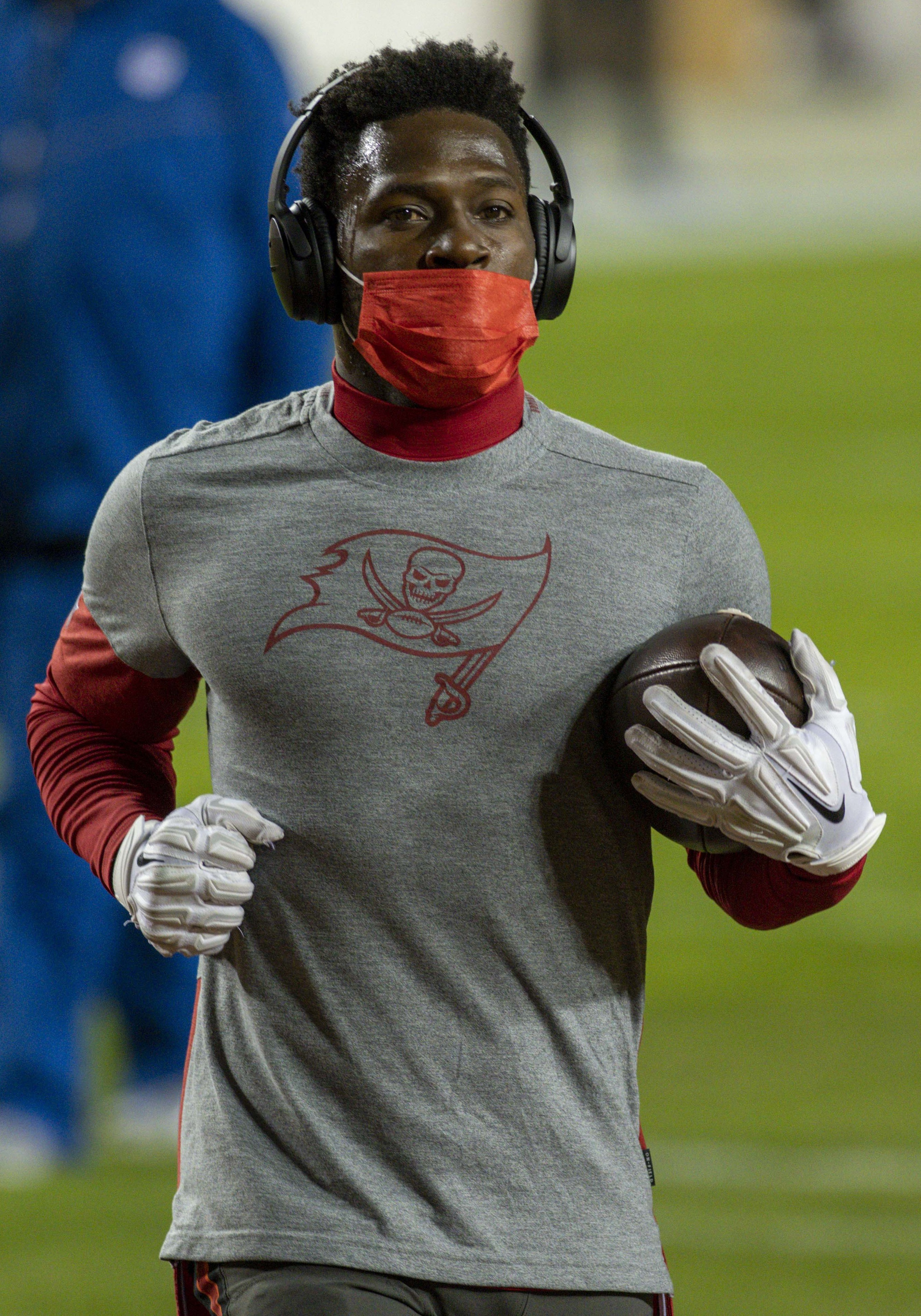
Brown warming-up with the Buccaneers prior to a playoff game against Washington in 2021

Brown visited the Tampa Bay Buccaneers on October 24, 2020. He signed a one-year contract with the team on October 27, which reportedly included $1 million in base salary and active game bonuses, and $1.5 million in performance incentives. Brown was reunited with Buccaneers' head coach Bruce Arians, who had been his offensive coordinator with the Pittsburgh Steelers in 2011.

Brown was reinstated from suspension and the team activated him on November 3. In his first game back on Sunday Night Football in Week 9, he was targeted five times, catching three passes for 31 yards. However, the Buccaneers were routed by the New Orleans Saints 3–38. In Week 10 against the Carolina Panthers, Brown caught seven passes for 69 yards in a 46–23 victory. The next day on November 16, it was reported that Brown had destroyed a security camera and thrown a bicycle at a security guard at his home on October 15.

In Week 15 against the Atlanta Falcons, Brown recorded five catches for 93 yards and a touchdown during the 31–27 comeback victory. This was Brown's first touchdown of the season and as a Buccaneer. In Week 17, against the Falcons, he had 11 receptions for 138 receiving yards and two touchdowns in the 44–27 victory. Overall, he finished the 2020 season with 45 receptions for 483 receiving yards and four touchdowns.

In the Wild Card Round against the Washington Football Team, Brown rushed once for a 22-yard gain and caught two passes for 49 yards and a touchdown in the 31–23 win. Brown sustained a knee injury during the team's Divisional Round win at the Saints, and did not play in the team's NFC Championship win over the Green Bay Packers at Lambeau Field. In Super Bowl LV against the Kansas City Chiefs, Brown recorded five receptions for 22 yards, including scoring the third touchdown of the game, a one-yard reception from Tom Brady, with six seconds left in the first half. The Buccaneers won 31–9, securing Brown his first Super Bowl championship.

==== 2021 season ====
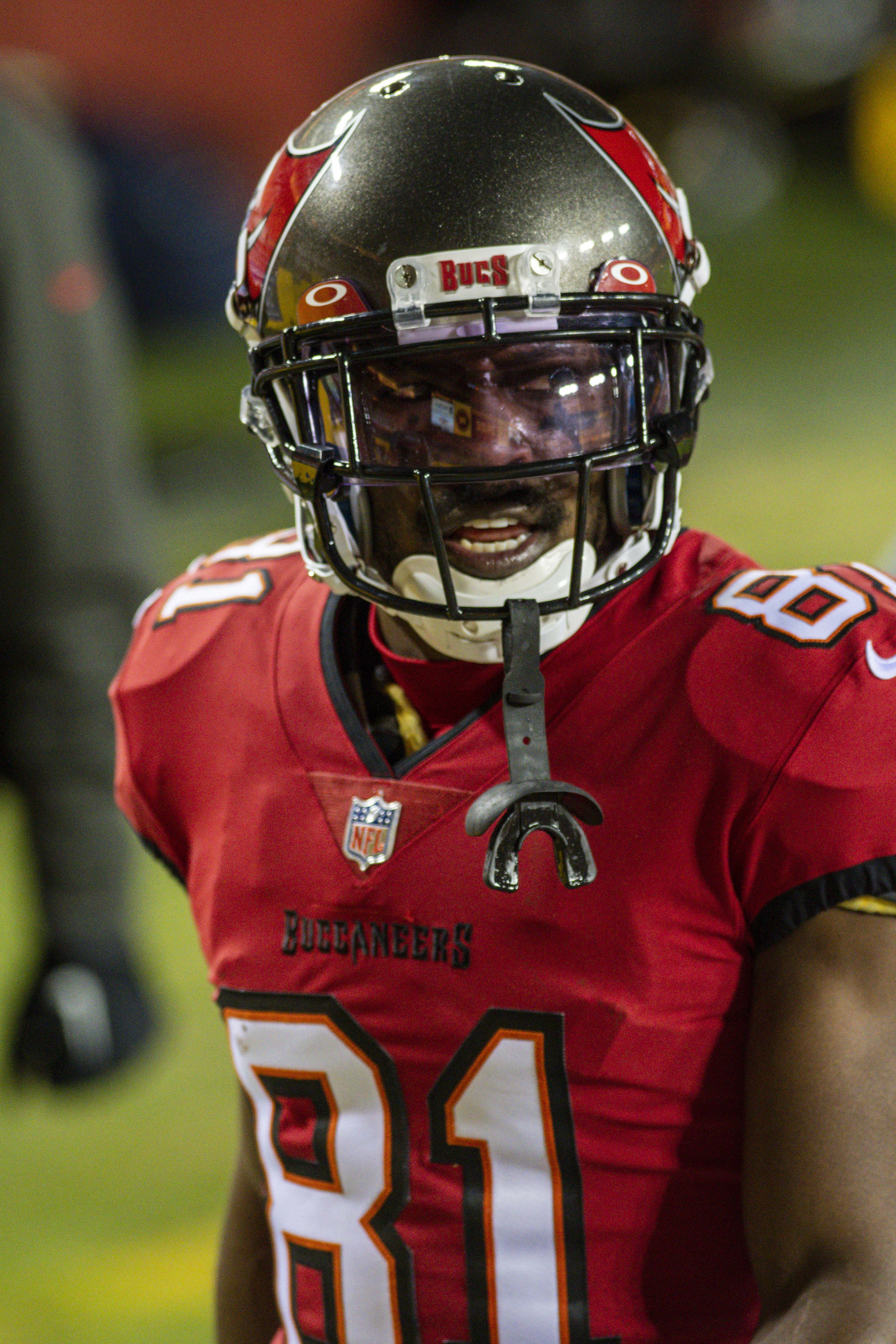
Brown during a game in 2021

On April 28, 2021, Brown agreed to a one-year deal to return to the Buccaneers. Despite off-season knee surgery, Brown passed the physical, and the deal became official on May 25, 2021. The deal was worth $6.25 million, a $2 million signing bonus, and $3.1 million guaranteed. On September 22, the Buccaneers placed Brown on the reserve/COVID-19 list. He missed the Week 3 game against the Los Angeles Rams because he was still on the list. On December 2, Brown was suspended for three games by the NFL for violating the league's COVID-19 protocols by misrepresenting his vaccination status.

In Week 17, during the third quarter of the Buccaneers' 28–24 win over the New York Jets, Brown took his jersey, shoulder pads, glove, and shirt off and ran off the field into the locker room. Buccaneers head coach Bruce Arians said in a postgame press conference that Brown, "is no longer a Buc." Later, Arians spoke to Fox Sports' Jay Glazer after the game, explaining he tried to get Brown to go into the game and Brown refused, which is when he told Brown to leave. When asked if he saw Brown take his jersey off, Arians said he did and he had, "never seen anything like it in all my years." Tom Brady in the same press conference stated, "We all love him, we care about him deeply, we wanna see him be at his best; unfortunately, it won't be with our team."

Three days after the incident, on January 5, Brown released a statement claiming that Arians and the Buccaneers had engaged in a coverup. Brown claimed that an MRI on his ankle showed "broken bone fragments stuck in my ankle, the ligament torn from the bone, and cartilage loss, which are beyond painful." Brown announced he would undergo surgery for these injuries. Brown was officially released on January 6, 2022, and passed through veterans waivers two days later without a team claiming him. Brown finished the season with 42 catches, 545 yards, and four touchdowns in seven games played.

=== Retirement and potential comebacks ===
On March 2, 2023, Brown announced his retirement from professional football. He unretired from professional football on April 28, 2023, with the intention of playing for the Albany Empire in the following month, but this did not happen. He announced his second retirement via the CTESPN Network, a social media page he created days prior, on April 24, 2024, retiring as a Las Vegas Raider.

On November 21, 2024, Brown released a statement coming out of retirement once again, expressing a willingness to play for the Pittsburgh Steelers for free for the remainder of the 2024 season.

== Career statistics ==
Legend
	Won the Super Bowl
	Led the league
**Bold**	Career high

=== NFL ===
==== Regular season ====
Year	Team	Games		Receiving					Rushing					Returning					Fumbles	
Year	Team	GP	GS	Rec	Yds	Avg	Lng	TD	Att	Yds	Avg	Lng	TD	Ret	Yds	Avg	Lng	TD	Fum	Lost
2010	PIT	9	0	16	167	10.4	26	0	—	—	—	—	—	36	507	14.1	**89T**	**1**	1	0
2011	PIT	16	3	69	1,108	**16.1**	**79T**	2	**7**	**41**	5.9	10	0	**57**	**1,062**	**18.6**	60T	**1**	0	0
2012	PIT	13	10	66	787	11.9	60T	5	**7**	24	3.4	13	0	27	183	6.8	29	0	**4**	**2**
2013	PIT	16	14	110	1,499	13.6	56	8	**7**	4	0.6	10	0	33	425	12.9	67T	**1**	1	0
2014	PIT	16	16	129	1,698	13.2	63T	13	4	13	3.3	9	0	31	319	10.3	71T	**1**	2	**2**
2015	PIT	16	16	**136**	**1,834**	13.5	59	10	3	28	**9.3**	**16**	0	22	212	9.6	71T	**1**	3	**2**
2016	PIT	15	15	106	1,284	12.1	51	12	3	9	3.0	13	0	16	163	10.2	33	0	0	0
2017	PIT	14	14	101	1,533	15.2	51T	9	—	—	—	—	—	11	61	5.5	16	0	3	0
2018	PIT	15	15	104	1,297	12.5	78T	**15**	—	—	—	—	—	—	—	—	—	—	0	0
2019	NE	1	0	4	56	14.0	20T	1	1	5	5.0	5	0	—	—	—	—	—	0	0
2020	TB	8	4	45	483	10.7	46T	4	2	−2	−1.0	1	0	1	2	2.0	2	0	0	0
2021	TB	7	3	42	545	13.0	62	4	1	6	6.0	6	0	—	—	—	—	—	0	0
Career		146	110	928	12,291	13.2	79T	83	35	128	3.7	16	0	234	2,930	12.5	89T	5	14	6

==== Postseason ====
Year	Team	Games		Receiving					Rushing					Returning					Fumbles	
Year	Team	GP	GS	Rec	Yds	Avg	Lng	TD	Att	Yds	Avg	Lng	TD	Ret	Yds	Avg	Lng	TD	Fum	Lost
2010	PIT	3	0	5	90	18.0	58	0	—	—	—	—	—	**17**	**262**	15.4	**38**	0	0	0
2011	PIT	1	0	5	70	14.0	25	0	**1**	18	18.0	18	0	—	—	—	—	—	0	0
2014	PIT	1	1	9	117	13.0	44	0	—	—	—	—	—	1	16	**16.0**	16	0	0	0
2015	PIT	1	1	7	119	17.0	60	0	—	—	—	—	—	2	8	4.0	6	0	0	0
2016	PIT	3	3	**18**	**309**	17.2	**62T**	**2**	—	—	—	—	—	5	28	5.6	10	0	0	0
2017	PIT	1	1	7	132	**18.9**	43T	**2**	—	—	—	—	—	—	—	—	—	—	0	0
2020	TB	3	1	8	81	10.1	36	**2**	**1**	**22**	**22.0**	**22**	0	—	—	—	—	—	0	0
Career		13	7	59	918	15.6	62T	6	2	40	20.0	22	0	25	314	12.6	38	0	0	0

=== College ===
Year	Team	GP	Receiving				Rushing			
Year	Team	GP	Rec	Yds	Avg	TD	Att	Yds	Avg	TD
2007	Central Michigan	14	102	1,003	9.8	6	10	74	7.4	1
2008	Central Michigan	13	93	998	10.8	7	20	116	5.8	0
2009	Central Michigan	14	**110**	**1,198**	**10.9**	**9**	**42**	**341**	**8.1**	**3**
Career		41	305	3,199	10.5	22	72	531	7.4	4

== Albany Empire ==
On March 2, 2023, Brown joined the ownership group for the Albany Empire.

On April 15, Brown told reporters that "I'm the owner, 100 percent owner" of the Empire, a statement denied by Mike Kwarta, who said that Brown and Kwarta each owned 47.5 percent of the team. Four days later, Brown bought Kwarta's ownership stake for $1, growing his position to 95% of the team, and the Empire announced that Kwarta and two other executives were no longer affiliated with the team. On May 3, Brown's representatives told the Times Union, a newspaper in Albany, that Brown had no personal ownership or complete control over the Empire, and that the team was actually owned by the Antonio El-Allah Express Trust Enterprise, which is owned by a foreign citizen named Antonio El-Allah. A letter addressed to a Times Union reporter began:

I Brown, Antonio Tavaris [sic] a foreign national but not a citizen of the United States at birth [sic], am writing to you regarding recent reports that have been circulating in the media regarding my supposed ownership of the Albany Empire team. I want to make it very clear that I am not the owner of this team, and any claims to the contrary are completely false.

Media outlets disputed Brown's self-reference as a "foreign national", since both of his parents are US citizens, and he was born and raised in Miami. The letter cited 8 U.S.C. § 1408 to back up Brown's claim that he is a United States national but not a citizen; this section of the United States Code applies only to people who were born in American Samoa or Swains Island, or to people in a few other circumstances not applicable to Brown. Some of the language in the letter may suggest an attempt by Brown to portray himself as a sovereign citizen. Mike Florio wrote that the letter "feels like a clumsy effort to create a shell entity that owns the team."

On May 25, Brown told WTEN that he intended to play for the Empire in their game against the Fayetteville Mustangs on May 27, which would have made him the first player–owner in professional football since George Halas. Because paperwork for his physical examination did not go through in time, Brown could not play in this game. As owner of the team, Brown had the option to override the physical exam requirement, but he did not exercise this option. On June 1, he told WNYT that he would make his playing debut for the Empire in their June 17 game against the Jacksonville Sharks, but this did not happen.

On June 15, the National Arena League terminated the Empire's franchise agreement, due to Brown's failure to pay the league for dues and fines that he owed.

== Other ventures ==
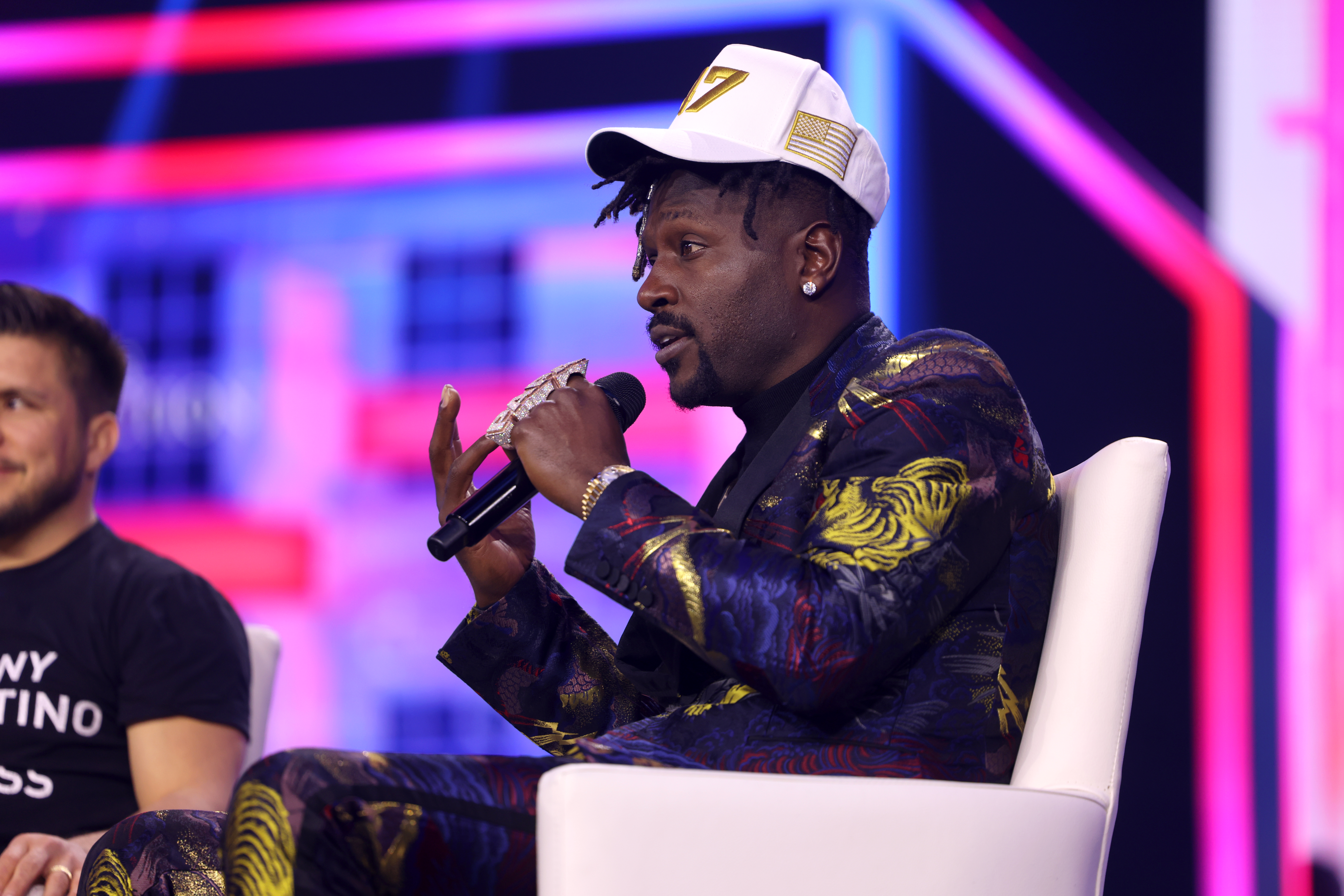
Brown speaking with attendees at the 2024 AmericaFest at the Phoenix Convention Center in Phoenix, Arizona

=== Television appearances ===
On March 8, 2016, Brown was announced as one of the celebrities who competed on season 22 of Dancing with the Stars. He was paired with professional dancer Sharna Burgess. Brown and Burgess were eliminated during the semifinals of the show and finished the competition in fourth place overall.

Brown was featured as the client in an episode of Treehouse Masters which aired September 7, 2018, where a "luxury skybox" treehouse, football field, and basketball court were built in his Pittsburgh back yard.

On January 2, 2019, Brown took part on the first season of The Masked Singer as "Hippo" where he sang "My Prerogative" by Bobby Brown. He was eliminated in the first episode.

=== Music ===
In 2018, Brown appeared in recording artist Drake's music video for "God's Plan".

In January 2020, Brown began releasing music under his initials AB; his debut single was "Whole Lotta Money". Later, in January 2022, Brown released "Pit Not The Palace", hours after he ran off the field during a Buccaneers–Jets game.

=== Business ===
Since February 2022, Brown has been the president of Kanye West's sports fashion line which is part of West's creative content company Donda Sports.

== Personal life ==
Brown is the father of five sons and two daughters. He has three sons and a daughter with Chelsie Kyriss and three other children by three other women.

In September 2019, Brown re-enrolled for online classes at his alma mater, Central Michigan University. During his first month of class, Brown was the target of ridicule after he asked his 6.2 million Twitter followers for help proofreading an English paper, which was due that evening, in a tweet with several spelling and grammar errors. In December 2023, Brown announced on his X account that he had graduated from Central Michigan.

Brown is the cousin of Philadelphia Eagles wide receiver Marquise Brown, who was drafted in 2019, as well as former wide receiver Kenbrell Thompkins.

Brown endorsed the Donald Trump 2024 presidential campaign on October 20, 2024.

== Legal issues ==
During and prior to the 2018 season, Brown was embroiled in numerous incidents in addition to causing tension within the Steelers organization. This included tossing furniture out of his 14th-floor apartment window in April, nearly hitting a 22-month-old toddler on the patio below, and being cited for speeding, driving in excess of 100 miles per hour (160 km/h) along a suburban Pittsburgh road. Brown was later sued for the April incident, and reached a settlement with the family of the child in April 2019. In February 2019, a judge ruled him guilty of reckless driving in the speeding incident, and Brown received a fine.

On September 10, 2019, Brown's former trainer, Britney Taylor, filed a lawsuit alleging he sexually assaulted her on three occasions. She claimed that he exposed himself to her and raped her. Brown and his legal team denied the allegations. On September 18, the Allegheny County district attorney's office announced Brown would not be prosecuted because Taylor's accusations were outside of the statute of limitations. The civil suit continued. On September 16, a second woman accused him of sexual misconduct. Separately, Victor Prisk, a Pittsburgh-based doctor who was treating Brown while with the Steelers, also sued Brown for "farting in his face" and $11,500 in unpaid fees in 2018. A settlement between Brown and Taylor was agreed upon in April 2021.

On January 13, 2020, following several domestic incidents in which police were called to Brown's home in Hollywood, Florida, the Hollywood Police Department stated they no longer want Brown to be associated with their youth league (PAL). The Hollywood police department returned a check from Brown and issued a trespass order preventing him from being involved with their youth league while saying in a statement, "We do not want him to continue to affect our youth, or influence them in a negative way." Days later on January 21, it was reported that Brown and an accomplice had attacked a moving truck driver at the home. Glenn Holt, working as Brown's trainer was arrested, while a warrant for Brown's arrest was issued a day later with a felony charge of battery and burglary. He turned himself in a night later on January 23. Brown was officially charged with felony burglary of a vehicle, misdemeanor battery, and misdemeanor criminal mischief on March 20. On June 12, Brown pleaded no contest to the felony battery and burglary charges and received two years of probation. He was also ordered to undergo 100 hours of community service, a 13-week anger management counseling program, and a psychological evaluation.

On October 1, 2022, Brown encountered further controversy after it was reported that he exposed himself to a woman at the Armani Hotel in Dubai. The alleged incident occurred on May 14, with Brown exposing himself and becoming physical with a female guest in a pool. On December 1, Tampa police attempted to serve Brown with an arrest warrant on domestic violence charges related to an incident with his ex-fiancée on November 28, in which he threw a shoe at her during an argument.

On April 14, 2023, an arrest warrant was issued for Brown for failing to make child support payments. Brown's attorney claimed that he paid over $30,000 in child support after the arrest warrant was issued and that the matter was cleared up. On June 3, Brown was reportedly asked to leave a Holiday Inn Express hotel in Albany, New York, where the Albany Empire was staying. A source told the Times Union that the hotel asked Brown to leave due to complaints of loud music and marijuana smoking. No criminal charges were filed against Brown. On August 22, an arrest warrant was issued for failing to pay child support. A Miami-Dade County judge signed a warrant for Brown's arrest on August 9, for missing a $15,000 payment to Wiltrice Jackson, Brown's ex-girlfriend and the mother of one of his daughters. Following the report of his arrest warrant, Brown went on a social media rant calling out the media, claiming his arrest warrant was not real, and also called out former Steeler Ryan Clark, stating: "Fuck the bitch ass reporter who ever wrote the story! You Mf don't know shit about me ! Where I came from what I been through!! Ryan Clark been a bitch in media say things then apologize next AB name drop we gone strike yo ass boy". On August 29, Brown claimed that his behavior stems from his issues from battling chronic traumatic encephalopathy (CTE), a neurodegenerative disease. In response to reporters calling him crazy, Brown stated, "My CTE acting up Fuck all y'all whoever played on my name". Brown also again denied there was a warrant out for his arrest. He had previously denied that the disease could have been affecting him. On October 15, Brown was arrested by the Broward County Sheriff's Office for unpaid child support and released on a $15,000 bond.

On May 23, 2024, Brown filed for Chapter 11 bankruptcy, owing $2.93 million to eight creditors, including a $1.2 million debt stemming from the January 2020 assault lawsuit. Brown listed his estimated assets as $50,000 or less.

On June 11, 2025, a Miami‑Dade County judge signed an arrest warrant charging Brown with second‑degree attempted murder with a firearm related to an incident on May 16 outside a celebrity boxing event in the Little Haiti neighborhood of Miami. The warrant alleges Brown seized a handgun from a security guard and fired two shots at a man he had previously fought, grazed the victim's neck, and set bond at $10,000 with house arrest upon posting. Prior to the warrant being issued, Brown reportedly fled the United States for Dubai in a possible effort to evade arrest. On November 6, 2025, Brown was extradited from Dubai back to the United States to stand trial for the charge. Brown pleaded not guilty, and was released from jail after posting a $25,000 bond. On September 23, 2026, Brown's attorney, Mark Eiglarsh, released a statement that Brown had accepted a plea deal in which he would plead guilty to a reduced charge of aggravated assault, resulting in probation. The deal included no prison or jail time, and no monitoring for use of alcohol or other substances. Eiglarsh said, "They made [Brown] an offer he couldn't refuse." He added that Brown's decision to accept the deal "should not be interpreted as a retreat from his position that he acted lawfully." The alleged victim said, through his attorney, Richard L. Cooper, on September 9, 2026, that he "does not wish to participate" in Brown's prosecution, and on September 23, 2026, Cooper said, "We believe that the ends of justice are accomplished with this plea deal, and my client wishes Mr. Brown good health." Brown is expected to appear before a judge on October 28, 2026, to formally accept the deal.

== See also ==
- List of NFL annual receiving touchdowns leaders
- List of NFL annual receiving yards leaders
- List of NFL annual receptions leaders
- List of NFL career receiving yards leaders
