= Marvin Ross =

American gridiron football player (born 1990)

Jacksonville Sharks
- Position: Defensive back
- Roster status: Active

Personal information
- Born: May 11, 1990 (age 36); Jacksonville, Florida
- Listed height: 5 ft 11 in (1.80 m)
- Listed weight: 187 lb (85 kg)

Career information
- High school: Trinity Christian Academy
- College: Florida A&M

Career history
- Columbus Lions (2013–2015); Cleveland Gladiators (2016); Calgary Stampeders (2017); Jacksonville Sharks (2017–2018); Atlantic City Blackjacks (2019); Columbus Lions (2021); Albany Empire (2022); Jacksonville Sharks (2023–present)

Awards and highlights
- AFL Rookie of the Year (2016); First Team All-NAL (2017, 2018); NAL Defensive Player of the Year (2021)

Career AFL statistics
- Tackles: 72
- INTs: 6
- Pass breakups: 24
- Force fumbles: 2
- Defensive touchdowns: 3
- Stats at ArenaFan.com
- Stats at CFL.ca

Marvin Ross (born 5 May 1990) is an American football defensive back for the Jacksonville Sharks of the National Arena League (NAL). Ross started out with the Lions from 2013 to 2015 as part of the Professional Indoor Football League. As an Arena Football League player, Ross was the 2016 AFL Rookie of the Year with the Cleveland Gladiators before playing with the Atlantic City Blackjacks in 2019. In between these years, Ross played in the National Arena League with the Columbus Lions and the Canadian Football League with the Calgary Stampeders from 2017 to 2018. With the Lions, Ross was awarded the 2021 NAL Defensive Player of the Year and had the season record for most interceptions.

== Early life and education ==
Ross was born in Jacksonville, Florida on 5 May 1990. Growing up, Ross played several sports including athletics and basketball. He played American football at Trinity Christian Academy and was awarded second-team all-conference as a senior student. After graduating, Ross played college football for the Florida A&M Rattlers football team from 2009 to 2012. He had a career total of 113 tackles and 14 pass breakups with Florida A&M.

== Career ==
Ross joined the Professional Indoor Football League as a member of the Columbus Lions in 2013. With the Lions, he was a member of the 2015 PIFL Cup winning team. In 2016, Ross moved to the Arena Football League with the Cleveland Gladiators. During his one season with the Gladiators, Ross was named the 2016 AFL Rookie of the Year after accumulating six interceptions and 24 pass deflections.

In 2017, Ross began his National Arena League career with the Jacksonville Sharks for six games as a defensive back and kick returner. Ross scored one touchdown, had eight interceptions, and was a First Team All-NAL pick with the Sharks. Ross joined the Canadian Football League in May 2017 when he was signed by the Calgary Stampeders during the team's minicamp. The following month, Ross trained with the Stampeders. After appearing in two games with the Stampeders in June 2017, Ross was released from the team in August 2017.

Ross returned to the Sharks in 2018 and was selected for the First Team All-NAL. For the 2018 season, Ross had 47 tackles and 19 pass breakups. On March 14, 2019, Ross resumed his AFL career when he was assigned to the Atlantic City Blackjacks. With the Blackjacks, Ross had four interceptions and 12 pass breakups. After the Blackjacks folded, Ross went back to the Columbus Lions in 2020. During the 2021-22 season, Ross had eight interceptions and ten pass breakups in his nine games. With the Lions, Ross had the season record for most interceptions while being awarded the 2021 NAL Defensive Player of the Year.

On June 6, 2022, Ross signed with the Albany Empire of the National Arena League (NAL).

On November 7, 2022, Ross signed with the Jacksonville Sharks of the National Arena League (NAL) for his second stint with the Sharks.

== Honors and personal life ==
Ross has one child.
