= Larry Ford (American football) =

American football player (born 1988)

Profile
- Position: Defensive lineman

Personal information
- Born: April 15, 1988 (age 38)
- Listed height: 6 ft 4 in (1.93 m)
- Listed weight: 260 lb (118 kg)

Career information
- High school: Georgetown (SC)
- College: West Virginia
- NFL draft: 2011: undrafted

Career history
- Florida Tarpons (2012); San Antonio Talons (2012)*; Lehigh Valley Steelhawks (2013); Orlando Predators (2013); Pittsburgh Power (2014)*; Lehigh Valley Steelhawks (2014–2016); Cleveland Gladiators (2014); High Country Grizzlies (2017); Atlanta Havoc (2018); West Virginia Roughriders (2019); Carolina Cobras (2021–2022)
- * Offseason or practice squad member only

Awards and highlights
- First Team All-PIFL (2015); 2× Second Team All-NAL (2017, 2022)

Career AFL statistics
- Tackles: 5
- Sacks: 0.5
- Stats at ArenaFan.com

Larry Ford (born April 15, 1988) is an American former football defensive lineman. He was signed by the Florida Tarpons as an undrafted free agent in 2012. He played college football at West Virginia University, after transferring in from Coffeyville Community College. After the Tarpons, Ford was signed by the PIFL's Lehigh Valley Steelhawks, where he played during the 2013 season, before signing with the Orlando Predators of the Arena Football League (AFL). Ford returned to Lehigh Valley in 2014, and eventually signed with the Cleveland Gladiators during the season. On March 3, 2017, Ford signed with the High Country Grizzlies. He signed with the Atlanta Havoc for the 2018 season.

On July 8, 2021, Ford signed with the Carolina Cobras of the National Arena League (NAL). On December 9, 2021, Ford re-signed with the Carolina Cobras of the National Arena League (NAL).
