= 2022 National Arena League season =

Sports season

2022 NAL season
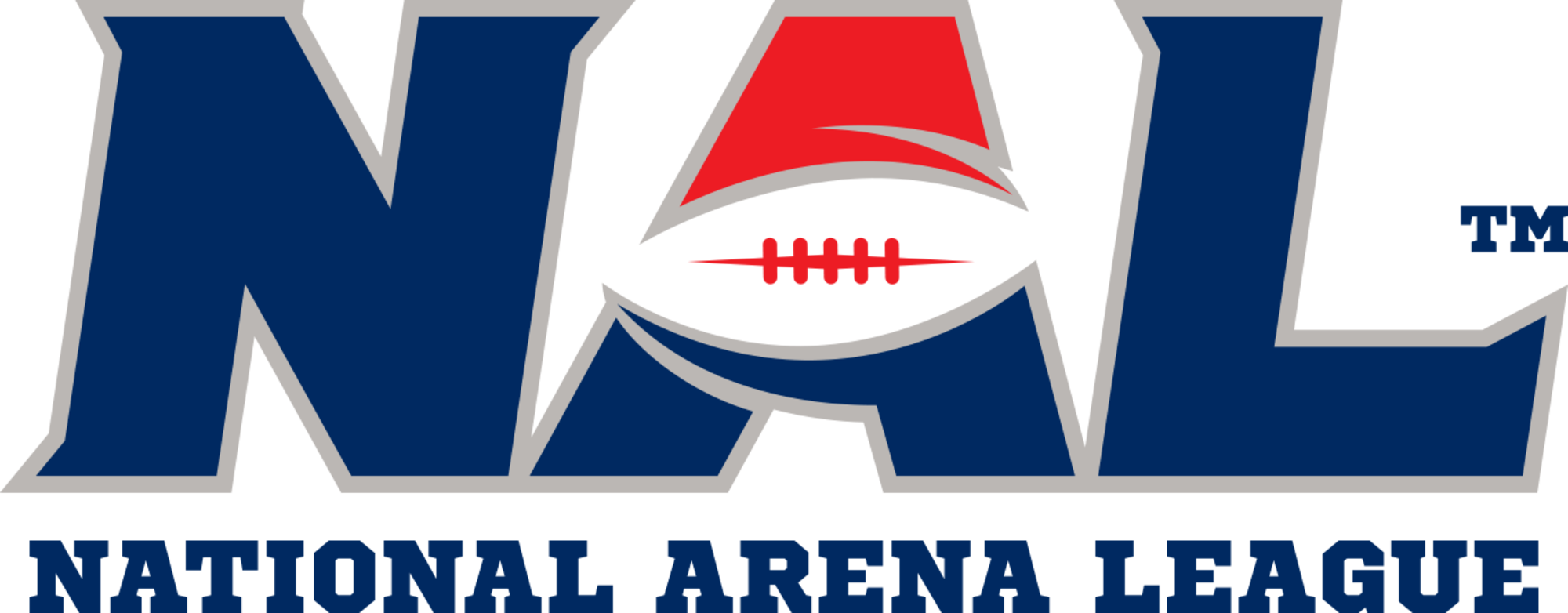
- League: National Arena League
- Sport: Indoor American football
- Teams: 6

Regular season
- Season champions: Albany Empire

2022 NAL Championship
- Champions: Albany Empire
- Runners-up: Carolina Cobras

NAL seasons
- ← 2021 2023 →

The 2022 National Arena League season was the fifth season of the National Arena League (NAL). The league played with only six teams mostly based in the Eastern United States, with one new team arriving from the American Arena League, the San Antonio Gunslingers, based in Texas. The season ended with the Albany Empire, Carolina Cobras, Columbus Lions, and Jacksonville Sharks qualifying for the playoffs and the Albany Empire winning the championship.

== Ironman football ==
For the season, the league re-introduced ironman football rules. This concept had previously been used by the Arena Football League from 1987 up to 2007. Ironman football is a variant that allows players to play in both the offense and the defense for the game. Only two players from the offense, two players from the defense, and one player from the special teams can have a player who has their position for just one side of the ball. The stated goal of the ironman football rules is to see players become more creative by showing their skills on offense and defense.

== Teams ==
For 2022, the NAL consisted of six teams without conferences or divisions. Each team played 12 games, six home and six away, with the exception of the Carolina Cobras and the Jacksonville Sharks who both played 14 games, seven home and seven away. During the season, there were two byes given out, with the exception of the Carolina Cobras and the Jacksonville Sharks, where they do not get a bye week.

2022 National Arena League Season
Teams	Location	Arena	Capacity	Founded	Joined	Head Coach
Albany Empire	Albany, New York	MVP Arena	13,000	2020	2021	Tom Menas
Carolina Cobras	Greensboro, North Carolina	Greensboro Coliseum Complex	5,000	2018	2018	Josh Resignalo
Columbus Lions	Columbus, Georgia	Columbus Civic Center	10,000	2006	2017	Jason Gibson
Jacksonville Sharks	Jacksonville, Florida	VyStar Veterans Memorial Arena	15,000	2009	2017	Siaha Burley
Orlando Predators	Orlando, Florida	Amway Center	20,000	2019	2019	Jeff Higgins
San Antonio Gunslingers	San Antonio, Texas	Freeman Coliseum	11,700	2020	2021	Fred Shaw

Reference for teams in 2022:

== Standings ==
2022 National Arena League Standings
Team	Win	Loss	PCT	PF	PA	STK
z – Albany Empire	8	4	.667	717	619	W4
y – Carolina Cobras	9	5	.643	725	676	W1
x – Columbus Lions	7	5	.583	576	554	W3
x – Jacksonville Sharks	7	7	.500	707	663	L2
e – San Antonio Gunslingers	4	8	.333	647	720	L1
e – Orlando Predators	3	9	.250	492	632	L6

z – clinched home field advantage

y – clinched home playoff game

e – eliminated from playoffs

== Playoffs ==
Semifinal
1	Albany Empire	68
4	Jacksonville Sharks	67
2	Carolina Cobras	65
3	Columbus Lions	51

2022 NAL Championship
1	Albany Empire	47
2	Carolina Cobras	20

== Controversies ==
- In a game between the Orlando Predators and the San Antonio Gunslingers, after official Andrew McGrath got injured and taken to the hospital in the second quarter due to a broken clavicle and a face laceration, and there were only four referees left. In the fourth quarter, with 24 seconds left, a Gunslinger was close to the end zone, and one referee signaled touchdown while the other signaled him short of the goal line, however, the clock kept until the time was out while the referees were discussing the play. After review, the runner was short of the goal line. The clock was set to four seconds left, however, per league rules there was a 10 second run-off since the ball was not spotted before the previous play. The Gunslingers then scored the game-winning play. After a review by commissioner Chris Siegfried, the lead official, and the supervisor of officials, they decided that that was the correct call.
- In a game between the Jacksonville Sharks and the San Antonio Gunslingers, Jacksonville player Devin Wilson hit official Gary Vaught from behind. The player was suspended indefinitely.

== Awards ==
=== Players of the Week ===
Players of the Week throughout the 2022 NAL Season
Weeks	Offensive Player of the Week	Defensive Player of the Week	Special Team Player of the Week	Ironman Player of the Week
1	Devin Wilson, Jacksonville Sharks	Walter Thomas, Carolina Cobras	Darius Prince, Albany Empire (1/4)	Jarmon Fortson, Columbus Lions
2	Sam Castronova, Albany Empire (1/3)	Rob Jones, Jacksonville Sharks	Marc Orozco, Albany Empire (1/3)	Darius Prince, Albany Empire (2/4)
3	Darius Prince, Albany Empire (3/4)	Cris Page, Carolina Cobras (1/2)	Marc Orozco, Albany Empire (2/3)	Zack Brown, Carolina Cobras (1/2)
4	Malik Henry, Jacksonville Sharks	Kwan Stallworth, Jacksonville Sharks	TC Stevens, Carolina Cobras (1/3)	Miles Kelly, Jacksonville Sharks
5	Darius Prince, Albany Empire (4/4)	Cris Page, Carolina Cobras (2/2)	Marc Orozco, Albany Empire (3/3)	Dwayne Hollis, Albany Empire
6	Rakeem Cato, Orlando Predators	Droell Greene, Columbus Lions	Cody Barber, Jacksonville Sharks	Anthony Johnson, Jacksonville Sharks
7	Arvell Nelson, Jacksonville Sharks	Rodney Hall Jr., Columbus Lions	TC Stevens, Carolina Cobras (2/3)	Zack Brown, Carolina Cobras (2/2)
8	Robert Kent, San Antonio Gunslingers (1/2)	Kenny Starks, Columbus Lions	Darien Townsend, Columbus Lions (1/2)	Darien Townsend, Columbus Lions (2/2)
9	Robert Kent, San Antonio Gunslingers (2/2)	Droell Greene, Columbus Lions	Daniel Justino, Orlando Predators	Kendrick Ings, Carolina Cobras
10	Sam Castronova, Albany Empire (2/3)	Marvin Ross, Albany Empire	Drew Pearson, San Antonio Gunslingers	Trevon Shorts, Albany Empire
11	Sam Castronova, Albany Empire (3/3)	Joshua Jenkins, Orlando Predators	TC Stevens, Carolina Cobras (3/3)	DJ Myers, Carolina Cobras
12	Mason Espinosa, Columbus Lions	Maurice Leggett, Columbus Lions	Nick Belcher, Orlando Predators	Kamrin Solomon, Jacksonville Sharks

=== The 2022 All-National Arena League Team ===
==== 2022 All-NAL Second Team ====
===== Offense =====
Position	Player	Team	Former PotW awards
QB	Robert Kent	San Antonio Gunslingers	Back-to-back 2022 Offensive Player of the Week.
FB	Pierre Turner	San Antonio Gunslingers	
WR	Khali Rashaad	San Antonio Gunslingers	
WR	DJ Myers	Carolina Cobras	
WR	Phillip Barnett	San Antonio Gunslingers	
OL	Dashawn Johnson	Carolina Cobras	
OL	Brandon Turner	Columbus Lions	
C	Melvin Hollins	Albany Empire	

===== Defense =====
Position	Player	Team	Former PotW awards
ML	Zack Brown	Carolina Cobras	Two time 2022 Ironman Player of the Week.
WL	Trevon Shorts	Albany Empire	2022 Ironman Player of the Week.
DB	Delvon Randall	Orlando Predators	
DB	Maurice Leggett	Orlando Predators	
DB	Droell Green	Columbus Lions	
DE	Chei Hill	Jacksonville Sharks	
DE	Larry Ford	Carolina Cobras	
DT	Kwan Stallworth	Jacksonville Sharks	

===== Special Teams =====
Position	Player	Team	Former PotW awards
K	Marc Orzoco	Albany Empire	Three time 2022 Special Team Player of the Week.
KR	Darien Townsend	Columbus Lions	

==== 2022 All-NAL First Team ====
===== Offense =====
Position	Player	Team	Former PotW awards
QB	Sam Castronova	Albany Empire	Three time 2022 Offensive Player of the Week.
FB	Zack Brown	Carolina Cobras	Two time 2022 Ironman Player of the Week.
WR	Darius Prince	Albany Empire	Two time 2022 Offensive Player of the Week, 2022 Special Team Player of the Week, and 2022 Ironman Player of the Week.
WR	Nyqwan Murray	Jacksonville Sharks	
WR	Darien Townsend	Columbus Lions	2022 Special Teams Player of the Week, 2022 Ironman Player of the Week.
OL	Cornelius Lewis	Albany Empire	
OL	Faleoga Russell	Jacksonville Sharks	
C	Derrick Zeigler	Carolina Cobras	

===== Defense =====
Position	Player	Team	Former PotW awards
ML	Kerry Starks	Columbus Lions	
WL	DJ Myers	Carolina Cobras	2022 Ironman Player of the Week
DB	Josh Jenkins	Orlando Predators	
DB	Markus Smith	Jacksonville Sharks	
DB	Dwayne Hollis	Albany Empire	2022 Ironman Player of the Week
DE	Ken Washington	Columbus Lions	
DE	Justin Alexandre	San Antonio Gunslingers	
DT	Walter Thomas	Carolina Cobras	2022 Defensive Player of the Week

===== Special Teams =====
Position	Player	Team	Former PotW awards
K	TC Stevens	Carolina Cobras	Three time 2022 Special Teams Player of the Week
KR	Kali Rashaad	San Antonio Gunslingers	

== See also ==
- 2022 Indoor Football League season
