= Devin Wilson =

American gridiron football player (born 1990)

Profile
- Position: Wide receiver

Personal information
- Born: October 13, 1990 (age 36); Nashville, Tennessee, U.S.
- Listed height: 6 ft 2 in (1.88 m)
- Listed weight: 205 lb (93 kg)

Career information
- High school: Hendersonville (TN) Paul
- College: Tennessee State
- NFL draft: 2014: undrafted

Career history
- Richmond Raiders (2015); Saskatchewan Roughriders (2015); Cleveland Gladiators (2016); Jacksonville Sharks (2017); Cleveland Gladiators (2017); Maine Mammoths (2018); Jacksonville Sharks (2019–2023)

Awards and highlights
- NAL champion (2017)

Career CFL statistics
- Receptions: 3
- Receiving yards: 39
- Receiving TDs: 1
- Stats at CFL.ca (archived)

Devin Wilson (born October 13, 1990) is an American professional football wide receiver. He previously attended Tennessee State University where he played college football for the Tennessee State Tigers and studied human performance and sports science.

== Early career ==
Wilson played high school football at the Pope John Paul II High School. He was named to the All-Region team in his junior and senior year. He also played track and field and received All-Region honors in that sport as well. Wilson committed to attend Tennessee State and started in one game in 2009. After playing in four games in 2010, Wilson was injured in practice after being tackled on September 28, 2010, paralyzing him. His doctors diagnosed him with a spinal shock injury, but he recovered fully in time for the 2011 season. From 2009 to 2013, Wilson started in 43 games and caught 102 passes for 1,200 yards and six touchdowns.

== Professional career ==
Wilson played for the Richmond Raiders of the Professional Indoor Football League in five games during the 2015 season. He recorded 40 catches for 483 yards and eight touchdowns.

In May 2015, Wilson was signed by the Saskatchewan Roughriders of the Canadian Football League. He spent the first six weeks of the regular season on the practice squad. On August 8, Wilson made his CFL debut against the Toronto Argonauts, recording two receptions for 15 yards and a special-teams tackle. He scored his first touchdown on a 25-yard pass in the August 22 game against the Calgary Stampeders.

On November 11, 2015, Wilson was assigned to the Cleveland Gladiators of the Arena Football League. He was placed on reassignment on April 1, 2017.

On May 23, 2017, Wilson signed with the Jacksonville Sharks.

On July 20, 2017, Wilson was assigned to the Gladiators.

In a 2022 game between the Jacksonville Sharks and the San Antonio Gunslingers, Sharks player Devin Wilson hit official Gary Vaught from behind. Wilson was suspended indefinitely.
