= Fayetteville Mustangs =

Arena football team

- Founded: 2022
- Folded: 2023
- Based in: Fayetteville, North Carolina at the Crown Coliseum
- Home arena: Crown Coliseum (2023)
- League: National Arena League (2023)

Personnel
- Head coach: Charles Gunnings
- Owners: Dr. Robert Twaddell; Jack Smith

The Fayetteville Mustangs were a professional indoor football team based in Fayetteville, North Carolina, playing their home games at Crown Coliseum. The Mustangs began play as members of the National Arena League in 2023.

On August 24, 2022, the National Arena League announced the Fayetteville Mustangs as an expansion franchise for the upcoming 2023 National Arena League season However, the team withdrew from their inaugural season after playing eight games due to financial difficulties with hopes to return in 2024.

== 2023 regular season ==
The original schedule was changed following the removal of the Albany Empire on June 15. However, the Mustangs also withdrew from the season on June 26 without playing any of the revised schedule.

Original schedule
Week	Day	Date	Opponent	Results		Location
Week	Day	Date	Opponent	Score	Record	Location
1	Saturday	April 8	at Orlando Predators	W 68–43	1–0	Amway Center
2	Bye					
3	Sunday	April 23	Jacksonville Sharks	L 53–73	1–1	Crown Coliseum
4	Saturday	April 29	at West Texas Warbirds	W 50–18	2–1	Ector County Coliseum
5	Sunday	May 7	San Antonio Gunslingers	L 27–40	2–2	Crown Coliseum
6	Bye					
7	Friday	May 19	Carolina Cobras	L 34–72	2–3	Crown Coliseum
8	Saturday	May 27	at Albany Empire	W 49-27	3–3	MVP Arena
9	Saturday	June 3	at Carolina Cobras	W 70–41	4–3	Greensboro Coliseum
10	Saturday	June 10	at Jacksonville Sharks	L 35–63	4–4	VyStar Veterans Memorial Arena
11	Bye					
12	Saturday	June 24	West Texas Warbirds			Crown Coliseum
13	Saturday	July 1	at Albany Empire			MVP Arena
14	Saturday	June 15	Carolina Cobras			Crown Coliseum
15	Saturday	July 15	Orlando Predators			Crown Coliseum
16	Saturday	July 22	at San Antonio Gunslingers			Freeman Coliseum
17	Saturday	July 29	Albany Empire			Crown Coliseum
