= Albany Empire (NAL) =

National Arena League team

Logo

General information
- Founded: 2020
- Folded: 2023
- Headquartered: MVP Arena in Albany, New York
- Colors: Fiery reddish orange, dark navy blue, grey
- Mascot: Mac and Jack

Personnel
- Owners: Antonio Brown; Steve Von Schiller; Charlotte Von Schiller
- General manager: Eddie Brown
- Head coach: Maurice Leggett (Interim)
- President: Alberony Denis

Team history
- Albany Empire (2021–2023)

Home fields
- MVP Arena (2021–2023)

League / conference affiliations
- National Arena League (2021–2023)

Championships
- League championships: 2 NAL: 2021, 2022

Playoff appearances (2)
- NAL: 2021, 2022

The Albany Empire were a professional indoor football team based in Albany, New York. They were members of the National Arena League from 2021 to 2023 and played home games at MVP Arena. They are named after the defunct Arena Football League (AFL) team of the same name that won the last ArenaBowl before the AFL folded.

== History ==
=== Establishment ===
Original Empire Logo (2021-2022)

In August 2020, Albany was announced as a 2021 expansion team in the National Arena League (NAL) and later obtained the rights to use the name of a defunct Arena Football League (AFL) team, the Albany Empire. The team was owned by the same ownership group, including Ron Tridico and Nate Starling, as another NAL team that was named after a former AFL team, the Orlando Predators. Former AFL Empire head coach Rob Keefe was brought back as head coach along with former Jacksonville Sharks' head coach and Empire assistant head coach Les Moss as assistant head coach. However, by April 2021, both had left to join the Indoor Football League's Iowa Barnstormers, stating they did not have the same plans as the owners. The team's head coach during their inaugural season was Tom Menas, who led the Empire to a 7–1 record and an NAL championship.

In November 2021, Tridico's and Starling's majority ownership of the team was sold to local businessman Mike Kwarta, while Tridico and Starling retained a minority stake.

=== Antonio Brown ownership ===
In March 2023, former NFL wide receiver Antonio Brown joined the team as a part owner. Brown said on April 16 that he was the "100 percent owner" of the team; Kwarta disagreed, stating that he and Brown each owned 47.5%, with Steve and Charlotte von Schiller owning the remaining 5%. Antonio Brown bought Kwarta's 47.5% stake for $1 on April 19, increasing his stake to 95%. On May 3, 2023, Brown's representatives told the Times Union, a newspaper in Albany, that Brown has no personal ownership or control over the Empire, and that the team is actually owned by Antonio El-Allah Express Trust Enterprise, which is owned by a foreign citizen named Antonio El-Allah. A letter addressed to a Times Union reporter described Brown as "not the owner of this team" and also "not a citizen of the United States at birth", which caused confusion.

On March 3, 2023, Eddie Brown, a longtime member of the AFL's Albany Firebirds and Antonio's father, joined the Empire as vice president of football operations and started being involved in the team's day-to-day operations. Ten days before the season, the team announced that head coach Tom Menas was no longer with the team and that offensive coordinator and assistant head coach Damon Ware became the team's interim head coach. On April 19, the team announced that Kwarta, Director of Media Operations Jeff Levack, and President Matt Woods would be leaving the team.

After the executive departures announced on April 19, 2023, the team went more than a week without access to its payroll systems. Head coach Damon Ware, who had not been paid since April 21, said on May 1 that he had left the team. Also on May 1, following a conflict on the team's bus while returning from a road game against the Carolina Cobras, the team suspended six players, three of whom were team captains and one of whom was the previous season's most valuable player. The team confirmed on Tuesday morning, May 2, that Ware had left and that eight top players had been released.

On May 3, Antonio Brown announced that Tom Menas, who had left the Empire before the start of the 2023 season, had been rehired as head coach. At a press conference, Brown said that the payroll issues have been resolved and did not comment about the team bus incident.

Menas resigned 18 days after his re-hiring, releasing a statement that read, in part, "… I have come to realize that my vision doesn't match our ownership's vision, and I need to do the right thing and step aside to allow the Albany Empire to find a head coach that matches their vision." Brown approached John Audino, the head football coach at La Salle Institute, about being the Empire's head coach; Audino told WTEN that he would not take the job. The team hired Pete Porcelli, La Salle's assistant coach, as its new head coach on May 22. Porcelli coached one game, a 49–27 loss to the Fayetteville Mustangs on May 27, and was fired the following night.

Brown said on June 2 that he had hired Terry Foster, former defensive coordinator for the Iowa Barnstormers of the Indoor Football League, as the Empire's new head coach, the team's fourth different head coach of the 2023 season. He also fired his associate, Ryan Larkin, for "bad representation of the brand" after a local restaurant complained on Facebook that the team had not paid for a food order delivered to the arena. Two days later, the team announced that Foster had not accepted the job offer, and that former Empire player Maurice Leggett had been hired as an interim head coach.

Following Brown's refusal to pay fines and the team not paying for their share of league operating costs, the NAL terminated the Empire's membership on June 15. The league announced plans to rewrite the rest of the 2023 regular season schedule.

=== Return of the Firebirds ===
Bob Belber, general manager of the arena, blamed the Empire's collapse not on Brown's erratic behavior, but on the state of New York's high worker's compensation premiums, which cost $1,500,000 in 2023, or 15 times higher than some other arena teams. Belber said that a lower insurance cost was necessary to field a team in the 2024 Arena Football League relaunch or in the Indoor Football League. Belber was nonetheless "optimistic" that a resolution could be achieved and noted he had been in discussions with two reputable groups to potentially bring indoor football back to the arena.

In 2024, a new Albany Firebirds team began play at MVP Arena. On October 2, 2023, Kwarta formally announced that he had signed a letter of intent to revive the Firebirds in the revived AFL. The AFL confirmed the Firebirds' arrival on October 5.

The Firebirds continue to own the Empire assets as an alternate brand, and in 2025, the team loaned out the Empire uniforms to the Corpus Christi Tritons when an airline snafu prevented the Tritons uniforms from arriving in Albany on time.

== Season-by-season results ==
League champions	Playoff berth	League leader

Season	League	Regular season				Postseason results
Season	League	Finish	Wins	Losses	Ties	Postseason results
2021	NAL	1st	7	1	0	Won semifinal (Carolina) 55–41; Won NAL championship (Columbus) 79–62
2022	NAL	1st	8	4	0	Won semifinal (Jacksonville) 68–67; Won NAL championship (Carolina) 47–20
2023	NAL	DNF	1	6	0	League membership terminated with seven scheduled games remaining
Totals			16	11	0	All-time regular season record (2021–2023)
Totals			4	0	—	All-time postseason record (2021–2022)
Totals			20	11	0	All-time regular season and postseason record (2021–2023)
