= 2023 National Arena League season =

Sports season

2023 NAL season
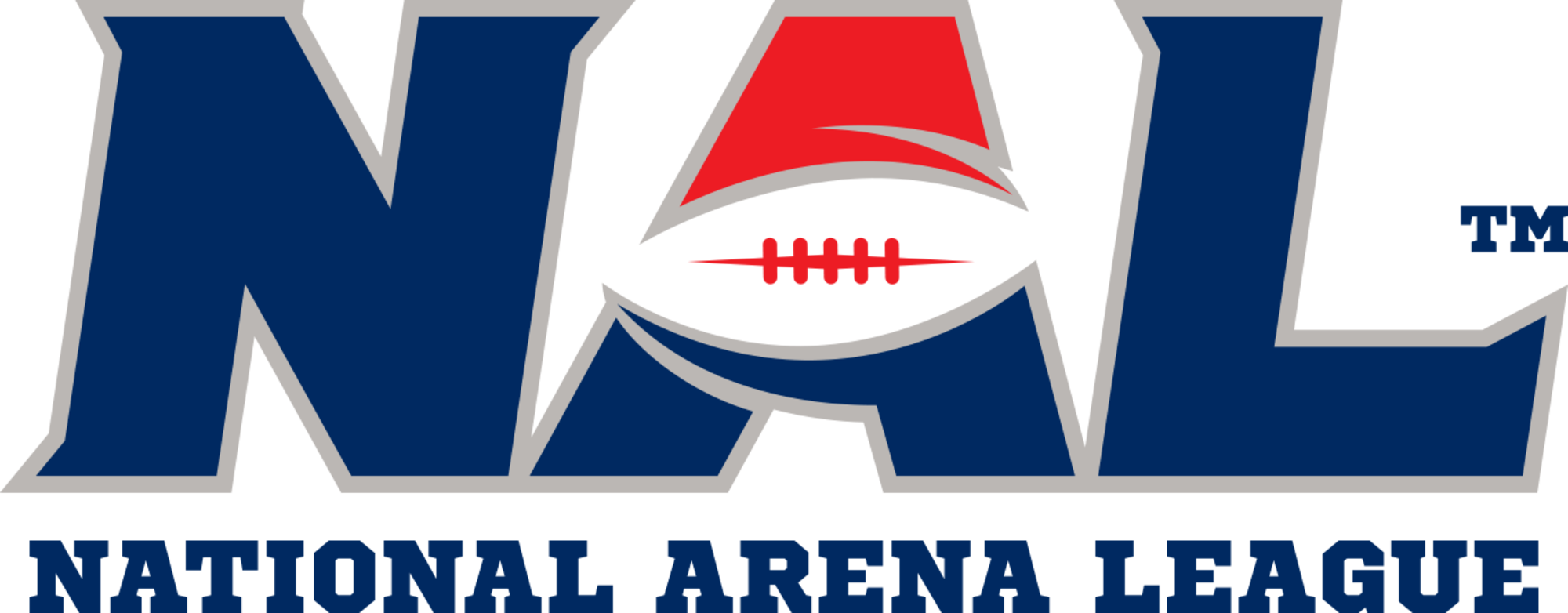
- League: National Arena League
- Sport: Indoor American football
- Duration: April 8 – August 12, 2023
- Teams: 7

Regular season
- Season champions: Jacksonville Sharks

2023 NAL Championship
- Champions: Jacksonville Sharks
- Runners-up: Carolina Cobras

NAL seasons
- ← 2022 2024 →

The 2023 National Arena League season was the sixth season of the National Arena League (NAL). The league started the season with seven teams following the additions of the expansion team, the Fayetteville Mustangs, and the West Texas Warbirds joining from the Arena Football Association, while the Columbus Lions left the league following the previous season.

== Teams ==
Teams	Location	Arena	Capacity	Founded	Joined	Head Coach
Albany Empire (Note: Albany was expelled from the league and NAL membership was terminated due to non-payment of league dues. Owner Antonio Brown was also fined for conduct detrimental to the league, a fine included with league dues, and Brown failed to pay that fine.)	Albany, New York	MVP Arena	13,785	2020	2021	Maurice Leggett
Carolina Cobras	Greensboro, North Carolina	Greensboro Coliseum Complex	5,000	2017	2018	James Fuller
Fayetteville Mustangs (Note: Fayetteville could not afford to keep the team running and folded after Week 12.)	Fayetteville, North Carolina	Crown Complex	8,500	2022	2023	Charles Gunnings
Jacksonville Sharks	Jacksonville, Florida	VyStar Veterans Memorial Arena	13,011	2009	2017	Jason Gibson
Orlando Predators	Orlando, Florida	Amway Center	17,192	2019	2019	Herkie Walls
San Antonio Gunslingers	San Antonio, Texas	Freeman Coliseum	9,000	2020	2022	Fred Shaw
West Texas Warbirds	Odessa, Texas	Ector County Coliseum	8,000	2019	2023	Tate Smith

== Standings ==
2023 National Arena League Standings
Team	Win	Loss	PCT	PF	PA	STK
z – Jacksonville Sharks	10	3	.769	810	555	L1
y – Carolina Cobras	10	4	.714	814	653	W5
x – San Antonio Gunslingers	8	4	.727	569	606	L3
x – Orlando Predators	4	8	.333	520	618	L3
e – West Texas Warbirds	3	11	.214	576	769	W1
DNF – Fayetteville Mustangs	4	4	.500	371	373	L1
DNF – Albany Empire	1	6	.142	257	339	L6

z – clinched home field advantage

y – clinched home playoff game

x - clinched playoff berth

e – eliminated from playoffs

DNF – Did not finish the season

== 2023 NAL Playoffs ==
Semifinal
1	Jacksonville Sharks	62
4	Orlando Predators	18
2	Carolina Cobras	52
3	San Antonio Gunslingers	36

2023 NAL Championship
1	Jacksonville Sharks	54
2	Carolina Cobras	45

== Players of the Week ==
Players of the Week throughout the 2023 NAL Season
Weeks	Offensive Player of the Week	Defensive Player of the Week	Special Team Player of the Week	Ironman Player of the Week
1	Rakeem Cato, Fayetteville Mustangs	Marvin Ross, Jacksonville Sharks	Kendrick Ings, Fayetteville Mustangs	Tre Long, Fayetteville Mustangs
2	Darius Prince, Albany Empire	Kenny Veal, Carolina Cobras	Marc Orozco, Albany Empire	Jalen Childress, West Texas Warbirds
3	Arvell Nelson, San Antonio Gunslingers	Sha-ki Holines, Jacksonville Sharks	Kevin Didio-Webber, Jacksonville Sharks	Phillip Barnett, San Antonio Gunslingers
4	Rakeem Cato, Fayetteville Mustangs	Freddie Booth-Lloyd, Orlando Predators	T. C. Stevens, Carolina Cobras	Jensen Stoshak, Jacksonville Sharks
5	Jalen Childress, West Texas Warbirds	Trevon Shorts, West Texas Warbirds	Kendrick Ings, Fayetteville Mustangs	Trevon Shorts, West Texas Warbirds
6	Zach Brown, Carolina Cobras	Mike Green, Carolina Cobras	Darius Prince, Orlando Predators	Zach Brown, Carolina Cobras
7	Sam Castronova, Jacksonville Sharks	Jabari Gorman, Jacksonville Sharks	Adam Smith, Carolina Cobras	Marquel Wade, Jacksonville Sharks
8	Sam Castronova, Jacksonville Sharks	Jabari Gorman, Jacksonville Sharks	Marc Orozco, Jacksonville Sharks	Jalen Wilson, West Texas Warbirds
9	Sam Castronova, Jacksonville Sharks	Sha-ki Holiness, Jacksonville Sharks	Kevin Didio-Weber, West Texas Warbirds	Devonte Baker, Fayetteville Mustangs
10	Malik Henry, Carolina Cobras	Joshua Jenkins, Orlando Predators	Marquel Wade, Jacksonville Sharks	Devonte Baker, Fayetteville Mustangs
11	Darius Prince, Orlando Predators	Dwayne Hollis, Orlando Predators	Kevin Didio-Weber, West Texas Warbirds	Trevon Shorts, West Texas Warbirds
12				
13				
14				

== See also ==
- 2023 Indoor Football League season
