= Carolina Cobras (NAL) =

American indoor football team

- Current season
Logo

General information
- Founded: 2017
- Headquartered: Greensboro, North Carolina at the First Horizon Coliseum
- Colors: Black, silver, white
- CarolinaCobras.com

Personnel
- Owners: John Kane (Majority); Mark Francis; Darren S. Hunter; Theron Davis; Paul C. Marquardt Sr.
- Head coach: TBA

Team history
- Carolina Cobras (2018–present)

Home fields
- First Horizon Coliseum (2018–present)

League / conference affiliations
- National Arena League (2018–2025)

Championships
- League championships: 1: NAL: 2018

Playoff appearances (5)
- NAL: 2018, 2019, 2021, 2022, 2023

2024 Logo

The Carolina Cobras are a professional indoor football team in the National Arena League (NAL) and that began play for the 2018 season. Based in Greensboro, North Carolina, the Cobras play their home games at the First Horizon Coliseum at the Greensboro Coliseum Complex.

The Cobras is the third indoor/arena team to call Greensboro home, following the Greensboro Prowlers of the af2 (2000–2003) and the Greensboro Revolution of the National Indoor Football League (2006–2007). A previous team called the Carolina Cobras played in the Arena Football League from 2000 until 2004. The AFL Cobras played three seasons in Raleigh and two in Charlotte before folding. The NAL Cobras use a logo similar in style to the defunct AFL Cobras' logo, but otherwise has no direct connection to the AFL franchise.

== History ==
The Cobras were officially announced as members of the National Arena League (NAL) on December 4, 2017. In their introductory announcement, the team named former Cincinnati Commandos, Texas Revolution, Nashville Venom and Wichita Falls Nighthawks head coach Billy Back as their new coach.

The Cobras inaugural season finished with a regular season record of 10–5, taking second place in the league. The Cobras then defeated the Jacksonville Sharks in the playoff semifinal and earned the right to host the 2018 NAL Championship game at home after the first place Massachusetts Pirates lost their semifinal to the Columbus Lions. With the Lions missing several starting players including their quarterback Mason Espinosa and all running backs, the Cobras dominated Columbus in the championship game 66–8.

In their second season, the Cobras again made it to the championship game, where they lost to the Sharks 52–48. Following the season, head coach Billy Back and most of his staff left the team to coach the relaunched Spokane Shock in the Indoor Football League when the NAL was announced to merge with Champions Indoor Football for the 2020 season. The Cobras initially hired Massachusetts Pirates' head coach Anthony Payton after the Pirates withdrew from the league due to the merger. However, the merger fell apart and the team then hired former defensive coordinator Josh Resignalo as head coach in December 2019.

On September 22, 2022, head coach and general manager Josh Resignalo stepped down to "explore other opportunities". The next day, on September 13, the Cobras announced that their offensive coordinator and arena football veteran James Fuller would be tapped as only the team's third head coach in franchise history.

On September 5, 2023 a decision to not retain Coach Fuller was made. He proceeded to take a position with the San Antonio Gunslingers of the IFL. The Cobras moved forward with hiring long time assistant and 2023 National Arena League Assistant Coach of the Year, Brandon Negron. In his first season, Negron led the Cobras to a 6-4 record (5-1 at home) but the team failed to make the playoffs losing two straight to close out the 2024 season. A decision to retain Negron was made for the upcoming season amidst ownership changes, league expansion and commitment by the team to remain in Greensboro for another season. The Omaha Beef poached Negron from the Cobras one month into the 2025 season. On April 24, 2025, the Cobras announced that head coach Mike Bonner resigned effective immediately. The next day, the Cobras announced the cancellation of the remainder of their season, citing "unforeseen circumstances." On May 21, 2025, the team ownership announced that they had begun discussions with a private equity firm.

== Season-by-season results ==
League champions	Playoff berth	League leader

Season	League	Regular season			Postseason results
Season	League	Finish	Wins	Losses	Postseason results
2018	NAL	1st	10	5	Won Semifinal (Jacksonville) 73–48; Won NAL Championship (Columbus) 66–8
2019	NAL	2nd	9	5	Won Semifinal (Massachusetts) 30–26; Lost NAL Championship (Jacksonville) 48–52
2020	NAL	Season cancelled due to COVID-19 pandemic			
2021	NAL	4th	3	5	Lost Semifinal (Albany) 41–55
2022	NAL	2nd	9	5	Won Semifinal (Columbus) 65–51; Lost NAL Championship (Albany) 20–47
2023	NAL	2nd	10	4	Won Semifinal (San Antonio) 52–36; Lost NAL Championship (Jacksonville) 45–54
2024	NAL	3rd	6	4	
2025	NAL	DNF	2	4	Team announced dormancy with six weeks left remaining in the regular season
Totals			49	32	All-time regular season record
Totals			5	4	All-time postseason record
Totals			54	36	All-time regular season and postseason record

== Head coaches ==
Note: Statistics are correct through the 2024 National Arena League season.

Name	Tenure	Regular season			Playoffs		Awards
Name	Tenure	W	L	Win%	W	L	Awards
Billy Back	2018–2019	19	10	.655	3	1	
Josh Resignalo	2021–2022	12	10	.545	1	2	
James Fuller	2023	10	4	.714	1	1	NAL Coach of the Year (2023)
Brandon Negron	2024	6	4	.600	0	0	NAL Coach of the Year (2024)
Mike Bonner	2025	2	4	.333	0	0	
