= Orlando Predators (2019) =

Indoor football team

General information
- Founded: 2019
- Headquartered: Orlando, Florida at the Kia Center
- Colors: Black, red, gold, white
- Mascot: Klaw
- OrlandoPredatorsFootball.com

Personnel
- Owner: John Cheney
- General manager: Shawn Knapp
- Head coach: E.J. Burt

Nickname
- Preds

Team history
- Orlando Predators (2019–2025)

Home fields
- Kia Center (2019–2025)

League / conference affiliations
- National Arena League (2019–2023); Arena Football League (2024)

Playoff appearances (3)
- NAL: 2021, 2023; AFL: 2024

The Orlando Predators were a professional indoor football team based in Orlando, Florida, with home games at the Kia Center (formerly Amway Center). They were members of the National Arena League from 2019 to 2023 and marketed as a revival of the original Orlando Predators, who had played 25 seasons in the Arena Football League from 1991 to 2016. The original owners of this team acquired the Predators' trademarks in late 2018 after the previous owner, David A. Siegel, allowed them to lapse. They moved to the new Arena Football League in 2024. Then in 2025, they became inaugural members of the newly-formed Arena Football One (AF1) following the third AFL's collapse but withdrew less than a week before its first game in that league.

== History ==
=== National Arena League ===
The relaunch of the Orlando Predators as a member of the National Arena League was announced in January 2019 and was owned by Kenny McEntyre and Nate Starling after acquiring the trademarks for the team in late 2018. McEntyre and inaugural head coach Doug Miller were both former players with the AFL incarnation of the team. In their inaugural 2019 season, the team finished with a 2–12 record and last place in the league. During the season, players claimed the team was poorly operated including failed payments and evictions from team housing.

Prior to the team's second season, the ownership of the Predators were removed by the league and replaced by another local ownership group composed of co-owner Nate Starling and the Trideco family. The new ownership group brought in former AFL Predator Ben Bennett as head coach. The 2020 season never took place due to the onset of the COVID-19 pandemic.

On May 21, 2021, the team announced the Trideco family's minority ownership had been purchased by John Cheney, allowing the Trideco family to focus on launching the expansion Albany Empire. Under Bennett, the team went 4–4 and qualified for the playoffs for the first time. Bennett left the team following the season was replaced by Jeff Higgins.

On September 16, 2022, the Predators announced veteran player Herkie Walls as their new head coach.

The team played four seasons in the NAL between 2019 and 2023.

=== New AFL (2024) ===
On July 18, 2023, the Predators announced that Nate Starling and Mike Kwarta had left the ownership group (Kwarta moving to the Albany Firebirds) and co-owner John Cheney took sole ownership of the franchise. On the same day, Cheney announced of the team's Facebook page that the team would be returning to the Arena Football League (AFL) that expects to re-launch in 2024. On September 25, 2023, at a press conference at Full Sail University, owner John Cheney announced the NAL Predators would join the third incarnation of the AFL. Former AFL Predator E.J. Burt was introduced as the head coach on November 6, 2023.

=== Arena Football One (2025) ===
On September 4, 2024, the Predators announced that they would be leaving the collapsed AFL and would join the newly-formed Arena Football One. They will play in the East Division along with the Albany Firebirds and Nashville Kats.

On March 4, 2025, the Predators announced their intent to withdraw from the 2025 season four days before their first game of the season, claiming that a prospective purchaser of the team had requested the Predators suspend operations for 2025 as a condition of buying the team. AF1 chairman Steve Titus rejected the proposed sale, called the excuse a "fantastic stor(y)," a "selfish and desperate aspiration," and a betrayal of trust. Titus announced that the Predators would not be welcomed back to the league and that AF1 would levy substantial fines against the Predators for the sudden withdrawal. The Predators responded by sharply criticizing the "fundamentally flawed" AF1 business model, stating it was controlled largely by three teams, and would continue efforts to sell the team and return in another league in 2026.

In a later statement, Cheney indicated a willingness to play out the 2025 season and stated that Titus had fundamentally misunderstood the email that had triggered AF1's decision to expel the team, furthermore demanding that the AF1 rescind the $1.2 million fine it attempted to levy on the Predators.

== Statistics ==
=== Season-by-season results ===
League champions	Playoff berth	League leader

Season	League	Regular season				Postseason results
Season	League	Finish	Wins	Losses	Ties	Postseason results
2019	NAL	6th	2	12	0	Did not qualify
2020	NAL	Season cancelled due to the COVID-19 pandemic				
2021	NAL	3rd	4	4	0	Lost semifinal (Columbus) 43–61
2022	NAL	6th	3	9	0	Did not qualify
2023	NAL	4th	4	8	0	Lost semifinal (Jacksonville) 18–62
2024	AFL	4th	5	2	0	Lost Round 1 (Nashville Kats) 62–32
Totals			18	35	0	All-time regular season record (2019–2023)
Totals			0	3	—	All-time postseason record (2019–2023)
Totals			18	38	0	All-time regular season and postseason record (2019–2023)

=== Head coaches ===
Note: Statistics are correct through the 2024 National Arena League season.

Name	Term	Regular season				Playoffs		Awards
Name	Term	W	L	T	Win%	W	L	Awards
Doug Miller	2019	2	12	0	.143	0	0	
Ben Bennett	2021	4	4	0	.500	0	1	
Jeff Higgins	2022	3	9	0	.250	0	0	
Herkie Walls	2023	4	8	0	–	0	1	
E.J. Burt	2024–present	5	2	0	.714	0	0	
