= 2013 in American football =

This article documents the year 2013 in American football.

== College football ==
=== NCAA Division I FBS ===
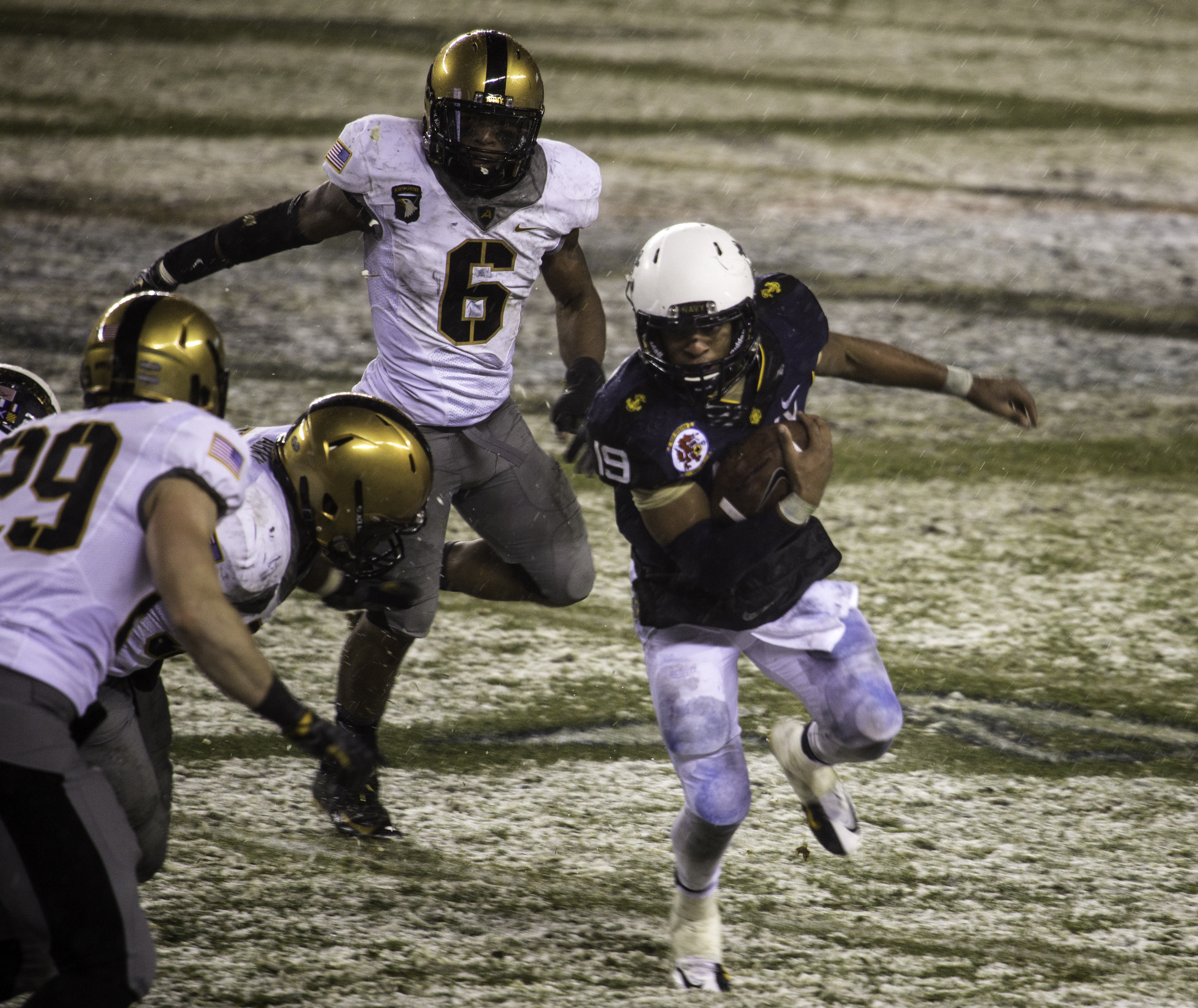
The 114th Army–Navy Game was played on December 14 in Philadelphia.

The 2013 NCAA Division I FBS football season began on Thursday, August 31 at 6:00 p.m. EDT, with both the kickoff of a game between North Carolina and South Carolina and a game between Kent State and FCS member Liberty. The Alabama Crimson Tide were voted as the preseason No. 1, receiving 58 of the 60 allotted first-place votes.

As part of the 2010–2014 NCAA conference realignment, the Western Athletic Conference discontinued football and the Big East Conference went through a massive change in membership that saw the conference discontinue football and many of the original members rebrand as the American Athletic Conference, which began play in 2013.

On September 7, the contest between Michigan and Notre Dame at Michigan Stadium set a new NCAA record for attendance at a college football game, with 115,109 people in attendance. This record would not be broken until the Battle at Bristol in 2016.

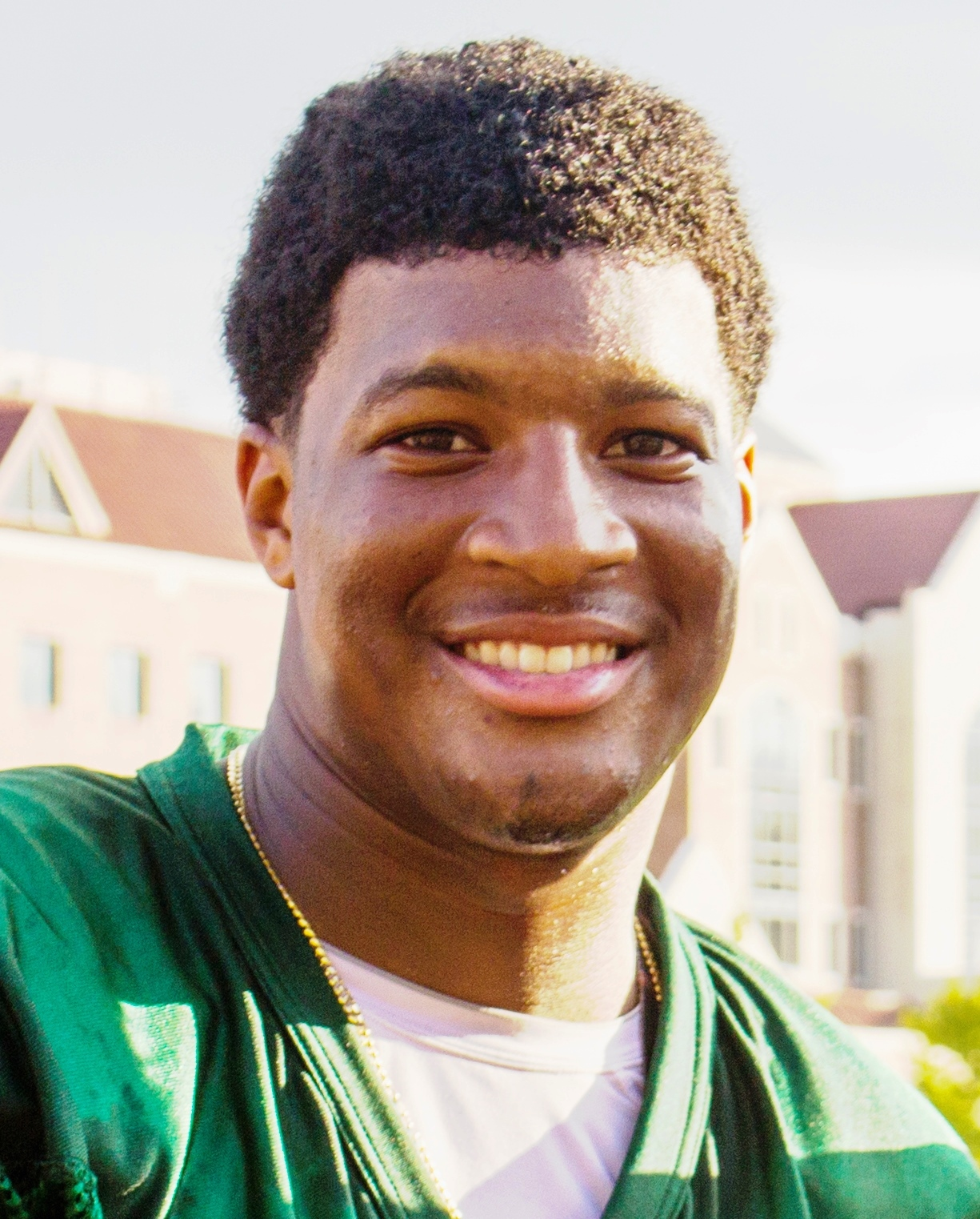
Eventual Heisman Trophy winner Jameis Winston in October 2013

On November 30, in the Iron Bowl game between Auburn and Alabama at Jordan–Hare Stadium, Alabama attempted a game-winning 57-yard field goal as time expired; however, the kick was short and was returned 109 yards for a walk-off Auburn touchdown, dubbed the "Kick Six". This came just two weeks after the so-called "Prayer at Jordan–Hare", in which Auburn defeated Georgia after a deep pass on 4th down late in the game was tipped by 3 Georgia defenders and fell into the hands of receiver Ricardo Louis, who then ran into the end zone for what would be the game-winning touchdown.

UCF and Baylor were named champions of the American Athletic and Big 12 Conferences, respectively, based on their superior conference records. Arkansas State and Louisiana–Lafayette were named co-champions of the Sun Belt, though Louisiana–Lafayette would later vacate this championship along with eight of their nine wins from the season. In the first of the conference championship games to be played, Bowling Green defeated Northern Illinois to win the MAC Championship. Other teams who won their conference championship games included Florida State (ACC), Michigan State (Big Ten), Rice (Conference USA), Fresno State (Mountain West), Stanford (Pac-12), and Auburn (SEC).

2013 BCS Bowl Games
Rose – Michigan State 24, Stanford 20
Fiesta – UCF 52, Baylor 42
Sugar – Oklahoma 45, Alabama 31
Orange – Clemson 40, Ohio State 35
BCS Championship – Florida State 34, Auburn 31

On December 14, Florida State freshman quarterback Jameis Winston was announced as the winner of the 79th Heisman Trophy, defeating Alabama senior quarterback A. J. McCarron and Northern Illinois senior quarterback Jordan Lynch, who finished second and third, respectively. Winston was the second consecutive freshman to win the award.

The bowl game season kicked off with the New Mexico Bowl on December 21, and concluded with the 2014 BCS National Championship Game on January 6. The National Championship, played at the Rose Bowl in Pasadena, California, saw the No. 1 Florida State Seminoles defeat the No. 2 Auburn Tigers, 34–31, to win the school's third national championship. This year was the last of the BCS era, as the College Football Playoff system would be introduced the following season.

=== NCAA Division I FCS ===
Similarly to the FBS, the 2013 NCAA Division I FCS football season began on Thursday, August 31 at 6:00 p.m. EDT, as Liberty kicked off against Kent State. The first matchup between two FCS teams began an hour later, with the start of a contest between Robert Morris and Eastern Kentucky at Roy Kidd Stadium. As the back-to-back defending national champions, North Dakota State received the preseason No. 1 ranking, along with 127 of the 134 first-place votes.

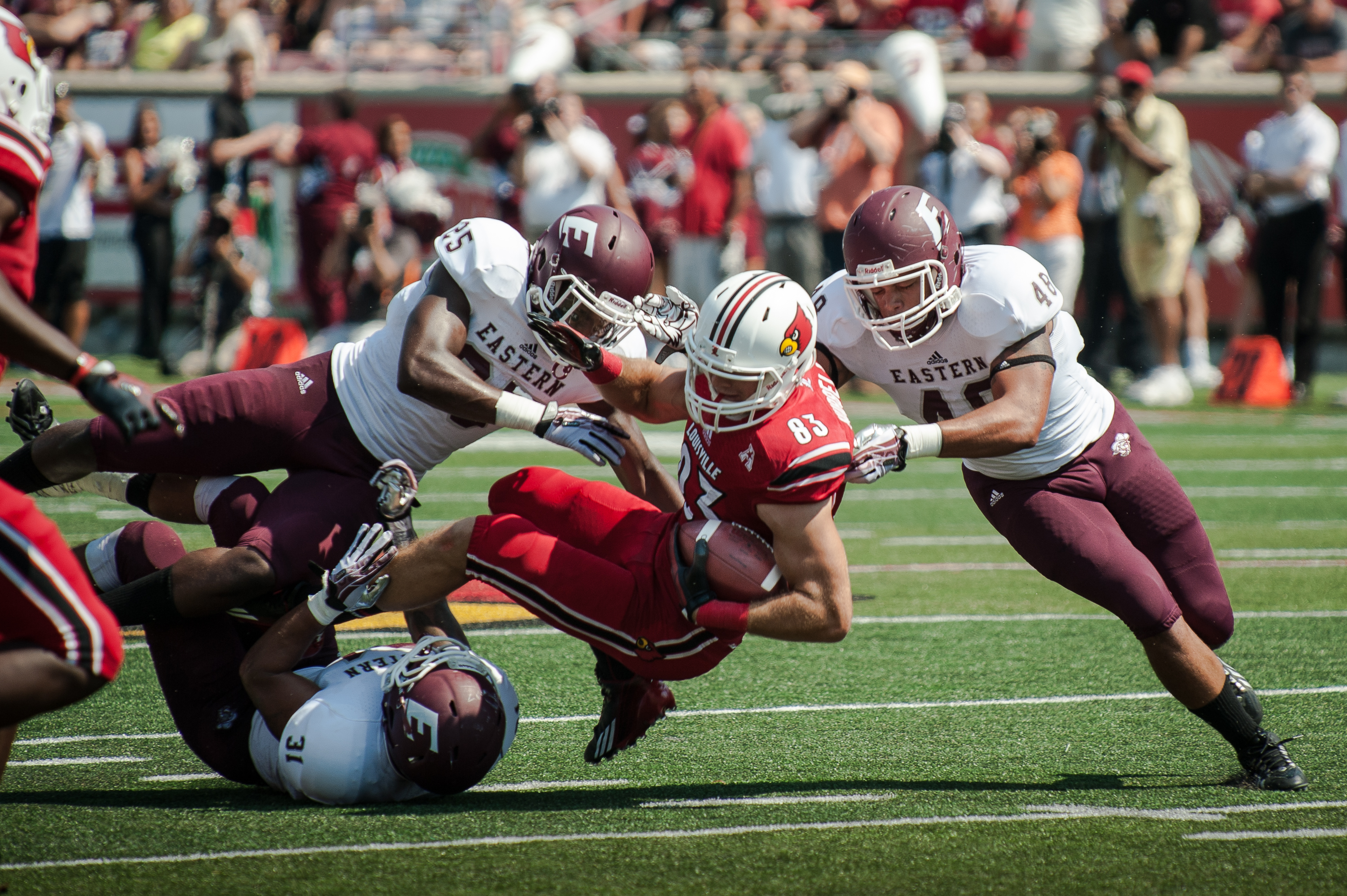
Three Eastern Kentucky players in action on defense against Louisville in September 2013

The 2013 season saw the debuts of two new football programs, Charlotte and Houston Baptist, as well as the fielding of a football team at Mercer for the first time since 1941 and at Stetson for the first time since 1956.

On August 31, No. 4 Eastern Washington defeated FBS opponent Oregon State, who was ranked No. 25 in the AP Poll at the time of the game. This marked only the third time that an FCS team had defeated a ranked FBS opponent, after Appalachian State in 2007 (def. No. 5 Michigan) and James Madison in 2010 (def. No. 13 Virginia Tech). Three more Power Five teams were upset by FCS opponents: Kansas State fell to No. 1 North Dakota State the day before the Eastern Washington–Oregon State game, August 30, and later on August 31 Iowa State was defeated by No. 17 Northern Iowa. The fourth and final instance came much later in the season, on November 23, when Georgia Southern upset Florida, extending the Gators' losing streak to six games.

On December 16, Eastern Illinois senior quarterback Jimmy Garoppolo was announced as the winner of the 27th Walter Payton Award, the award for the most outstanding player in Division I FCS football.

The top eight seeds in the FCS Playoffs were given to, in order, North Dakota State, Eastern Illinois, Eastern Washington, Southeastern Louisiana, Maine, McNeese State, Towson, and Montana. No. 5 Maine, No. 6 McNeese State, and No. 8 Montana were the only three seeded teams to lose in their first playoff game. The national semifinals consisted of No. 1 North Dakota State, No. 3 Eastern Washington, No. 7 Towson, and unseeded New Hampshire. NDSU and Towson won their respective semifinal matchups, and the season ended on January 4, 2014, with the 2014 NCAA Division I Football Championship Game at Toyota Stadium in Frisco, Texas, which saw No. 1 North Dakota State defeat No. 7 Towson, 35–7, to win their third consecutive national championship.

=== NCAA Division II ===
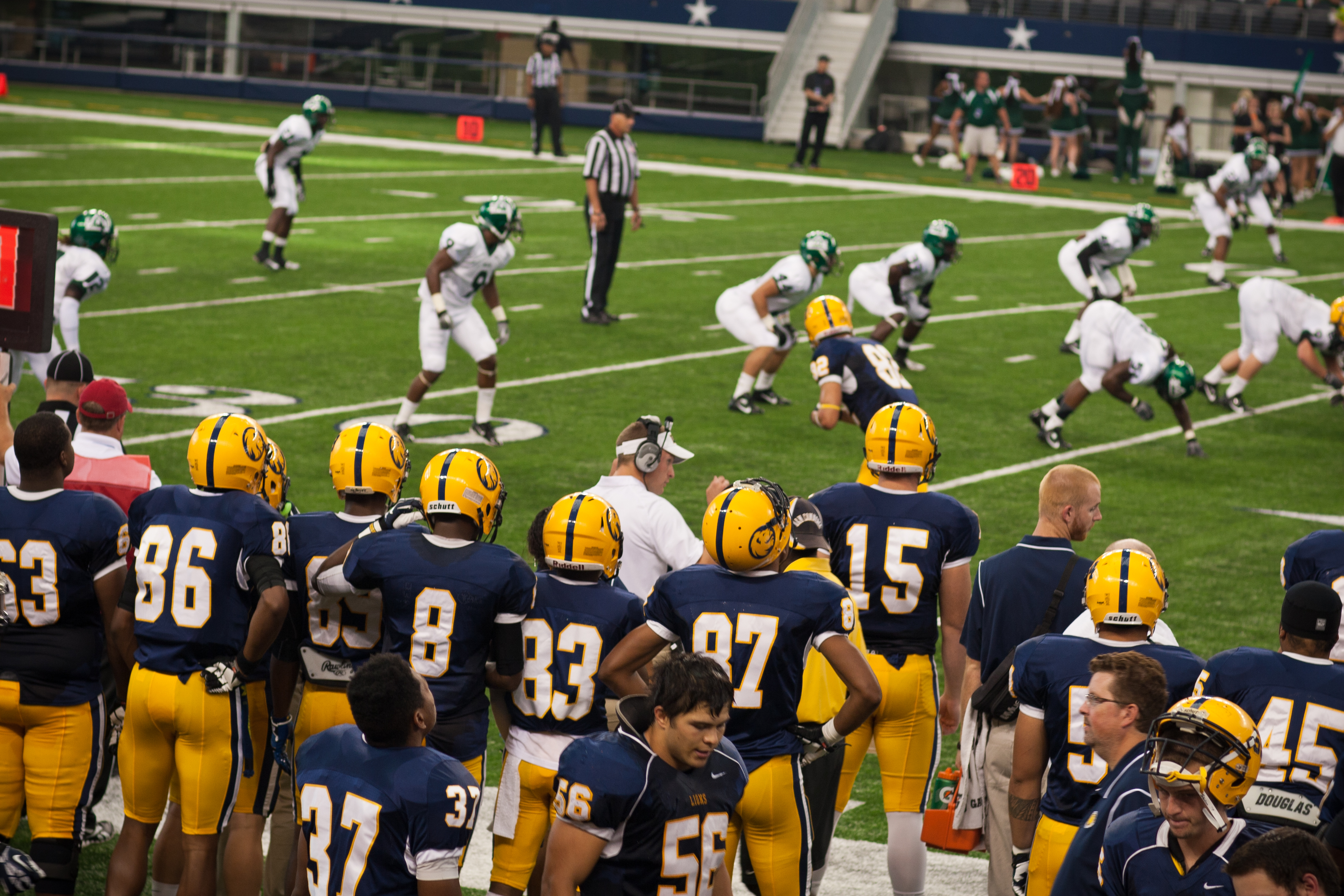
A contest between Texas A&M–Commerce and Delta State at Cowboys Stadium in September 2013

The 2013 NCAA Division II football season began on August 31, 2013. Defending national champions Valdosta State received the preseason No. 1 ranking for the third time in school history.

Division II saw the loss of two programs to the Division I FCS ranks, Abilene Christian and Incarnate Word, but also saw the debuts of two new programs in Alderson Broaddus and Florida Tech.

On December 20, Bloomsburg running back Franklyn Quiteh was announced as the winner of the 28th Harlon Hill Trophy, the award for the best player in Division II football.

The NCAA Playoffs were divided into four super regions, each of which contained six teams seeded 1–6. Shepherd, Lenoir–Rhyne, Northwest Missouri State, and CSU–Pueblo received the four No. 1 seeds. CSU–Pueblo was upset by No. 4 seed Grand Valley State in its first game, and Shepherd was defeated by No. 3 seed West Chester in its second game; both lower-seeded teams made the semifinals. The 2013 NCAA Division II Football Championship Game, played on December 21 at Braly Municipal Stadium in Florence, Alabama, saw No. 1 seed Northwest Missouri State defeat No. 1 seed Lenoir–Rhyne, 43–28, to win the school's fifth national championship.

=== NCAA Division III ===
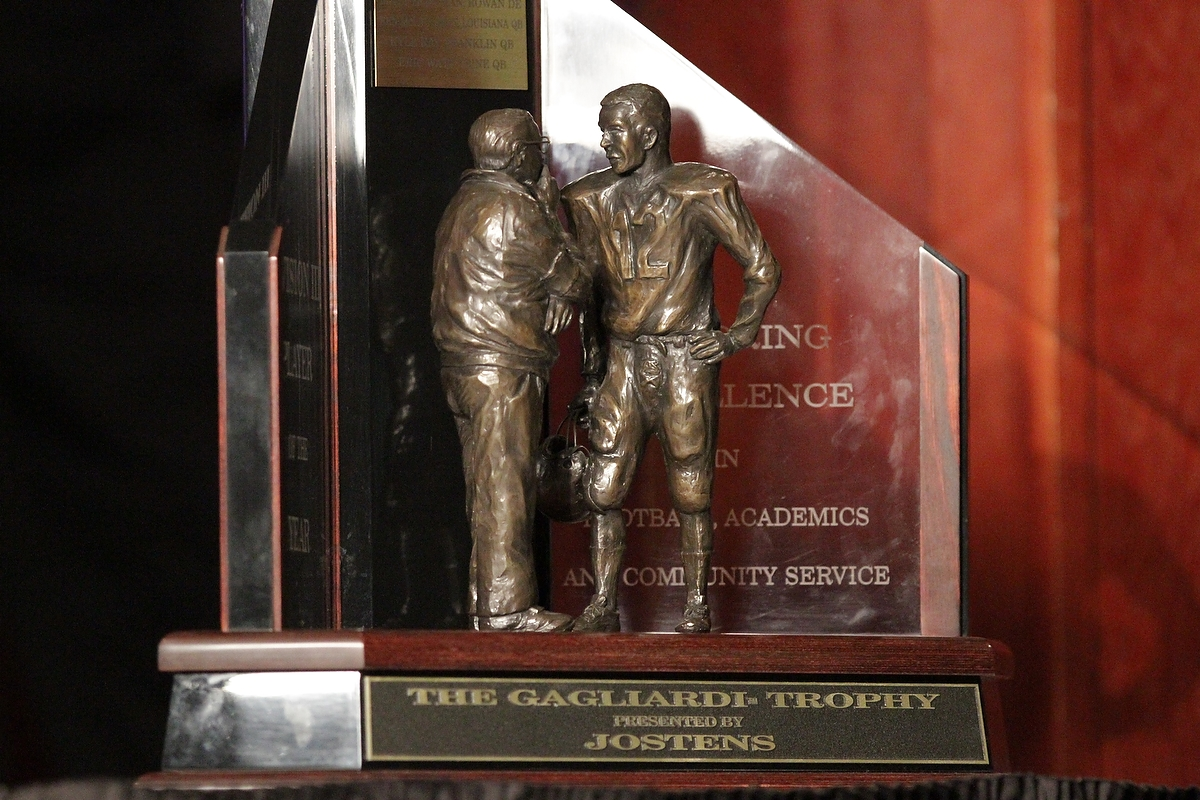
The Gagliardi Trophy, won in 2013 by Kevin Burke.

The 2013 NCAA Division III football season began on August 31, and the regular season concluded on November 16. The following Saturday, November 23, the playoffs began, with opening round games played at campus sites.

In the first round, which consisted of sixteen games, only three home teams lost: Centennial Conference champions Johns Hopkins were defeated by Wesley, Illinois Wesleyan lost to IIAC champions Wartburg, and John Carroll fell to St. John Fisher. St. John Fisher was the only away team to win in the second round, as they upset Liberty League champions Hobart. The third round again saw only one away team prevail, CCIW champions North Central defeated MIAC champions Bethel on the road.

This set up the semifinals, which consisted of OAC champions No. 3 Mount Union, CCIW champions No. 5 North Central, WIAC champions No. 1 Wisconsin–Whitewater, and ASC champions No. 2 Mary Hardin–Baylor. In one semifinal, Mount Union defeated North Central at home, 41–40, after a passing touchdown gave the Purple Raiders the lead with just 1:26 left in the game. The other semifinal saw Wisconsin–Whitewater edge Mary Hardin–Baylor on the road, 16–15, despite a scoreless fourth quarter from the Warhawks.

This set up the national championship game, played on December 20 at Salem Stadium in Salem, Virginia, between No. 3 Mount Union and No. 1 Wisconsin–Whitewater. Two days prior, on December 18, Mount Union quarterback Kevin Burke was named the winner of the 21st Gagliardi Trophy, the award for the most outstanding player in NCAA Division III football. The championship game, unlike the semifinals, was not a close matchup; the Warhawks defeated the Purple Raiders 52–14 to win the national championship, Wisconsin–Whitewater's fourth.

=== NAIA ===
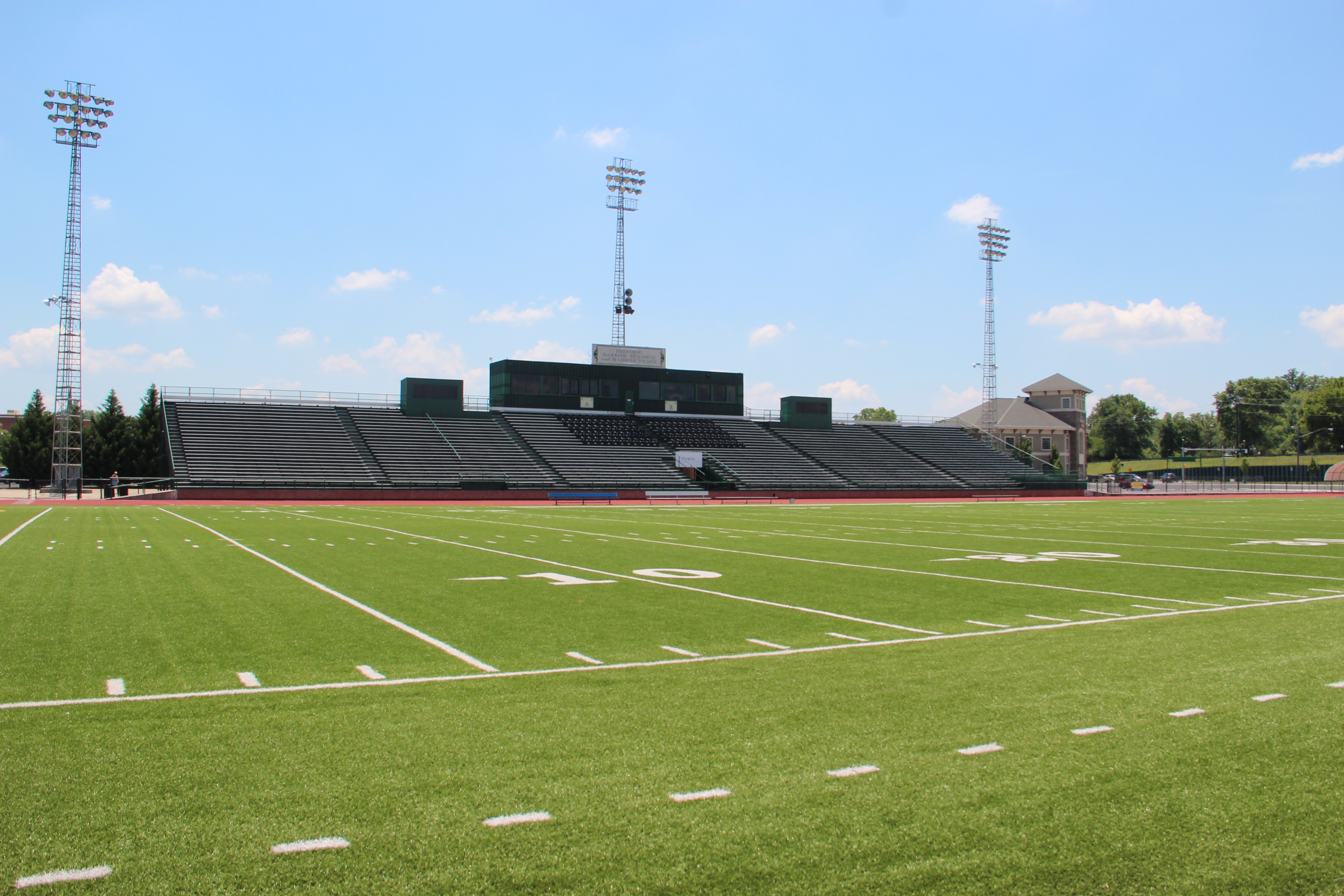
Barron Stadium in Rome, Georgia, hosted the 2013 NAIA Championship Game.

The 2013 NAIA football season began with the Morningside (IA) Mustangs holding the No. 1 spot in the NAIA Coaches' Poll, despite only receiving four of the thirteen first-place votes, eight of which went to No. 2 Marian (IN). A Marian loss to No. 4 Saint Xavier (IL) on September 7 dropped them to No. 16, and the Knights would drop out of the poll entirely after another loss the following week to Wisconsin–Oshkosh, ranked No. 10 in the NCAA Division III polls. Morningside would retain the No. 1 spot until they lost on November 9 to No. 19 Northwestern (IA) and dropped to No. 5, opening the door for the Cumberlands (KY) Patriots to take the top spot in the November 11 poll. In the final poll before the NAIA Playoffs began, released on November 17, Cumberlands (KY) retained the top spot, followed by No. 2 Grand View (IA), No. 3 Carroll (MT), No. 4 Baker (KS), and No. 5 Morningside (IA).

The opening round of the NAIA Championship tournament was played on November 23, with sixteen teams earning tournament berths. No. 8 Benedictine (KS) was the only team to be upset in the first round, as they lost 13–14 at the hands of No. 11 Tabor (KS). No. 5 Morningside provided the only upset of the quarterfinals, as they knocked off No. 4 Baker by a score of 36–28. The semifinals of the tournament saw No. 1 Cumberlands defeat No. 3 Carroll 34–27 in overtime, and No. 2 Grand View dismantle No. 5 Morningside 35–0. This set up a national championship matchup on December 21 at Barron Stadium in Rome, Georgia, between the top-ranked Cumberlands Patriots and the second-ranked Grand View Vikings, both a perfect 13–0 entering the contest. The Vikings jumped out to an early 14–3 lead, and had a 21–17 advantage at halftime. A scoreless third quarter kept the lead with Grand View going into the final quarter. The Vikings extended their lead to 28–17, and Cumberlands responded with six points of their own; however, Grand View scored one final time and the contest finished with the Grand View Vikings improving their record to 14–0 and being crowned national champions, by a score of 35–23, for the first time in school history.

== NFL ==
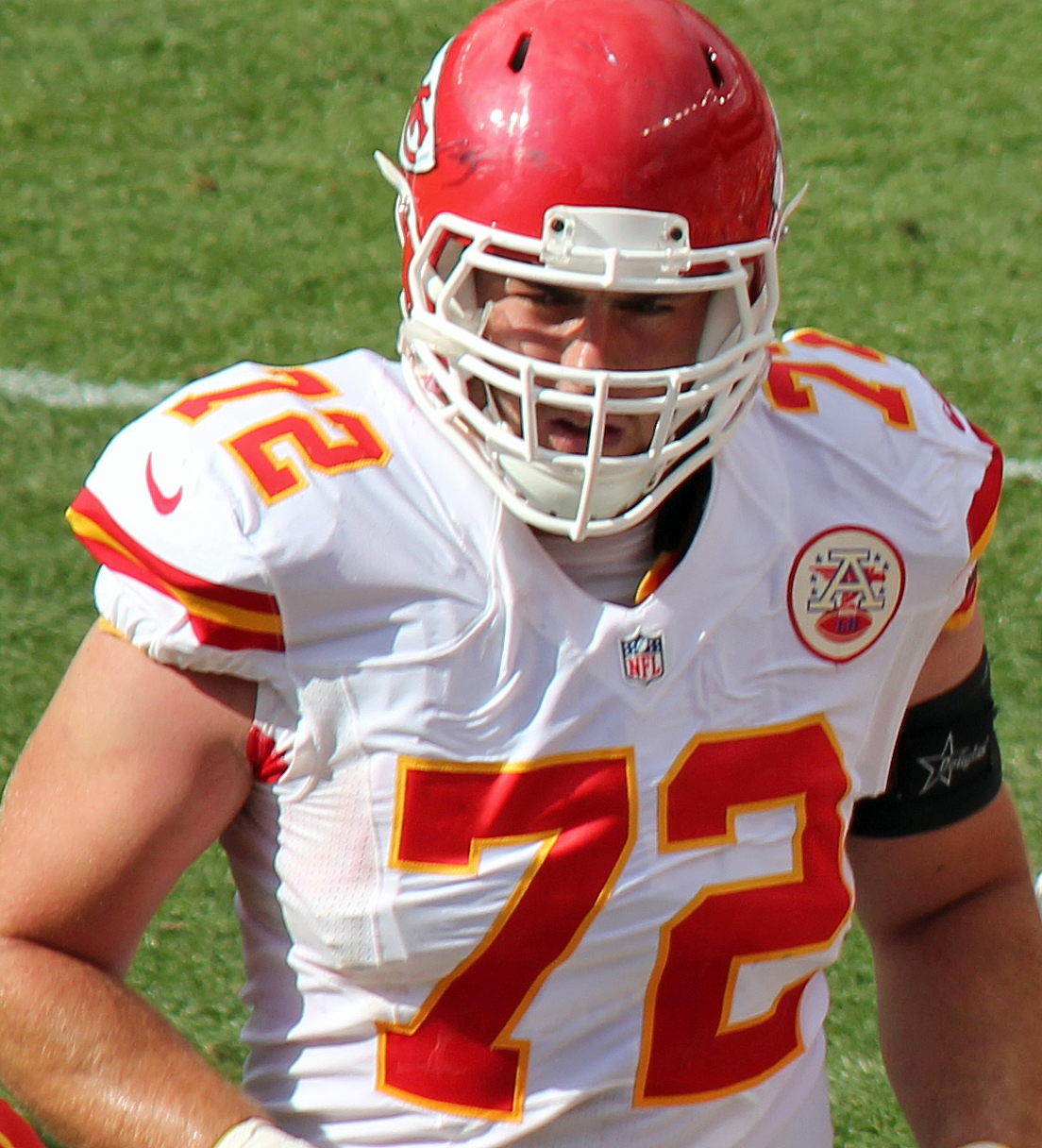
Eric Fisher, the first overall pick in the 2013 NFL Draft

The 2013 NFL draft took place from April 25–27, 2013, at Radio City Music Hall in New York City. Central Michigan offensive tackle Eric Fisher was selected first overall by the Kansas City Chiefs, followed by Texas A&M offensive tackle Luke Joeckel (Jacksonville Jaguars), Oregon defensive end Dion Jordan (Miami Dolphins), Oklahoma offensive tackle Lane Johnson (Philadelphia Eagles), and BYU defensive tackle Ezekiel Ansah (Detroit Lions). West Virginia wide receiver Tavon Austin was the first skill player drafted, taken eighth overall by the St. Louis Rams. Other notable selections included Desmond Trufant (22nd, Falcons), DeAndre Hopkins (27th, Texans), Cordarrelle Patterson (29th, Vikings), Zach Ertz (35th, Eagles), Le'Veon Bell (48th, Steelers), Eddie Lacy (61st, Packers), Travis Kelce (63rd, Chiefs), and Tyrann Mathieu (69th, Cardinals), among others. South Carolina tight end Justice Cunningham was selected last by the Indianapolis Colts, making him the 2013 Mr. Irrelevant.

The 2013 NFL season commenced with the Pro Football Hall of Fame Game, played on August 4 at Fawcett Stadium in Canton, Ohio. In the game, the Dallas Cowboys defeated the Miami Dolphins, 24–20. The preseason schedule, which consisted of 65 games in total (no less than four for each team), concluded on August 29.

The regular season began with the NFL Kickoff Game on September 5, between the Denver Broncos and defending Super Bowl champion Baltimore Ravens at the Sports Authority Field at Mile High in Denver. This game saw the Broncos, led by Peyton Manning's 7 touchdown performance, defeat Baltimore 49–27. Throughout the regular season, three games were played outside the United States: two International Series games were held at Wembley Stadium in London in September, between Minnesota and Pittsburgh, and October, between San Francisco and Jacksonville. In December, a game was played between Buffalo and Atlanta at the Rogers Centre in Toronto.

At the conclusion of the regular season, the Denver Broncos (13–3) topped the AFC West and the AFC as a whole, capturing the top AFC seed in the playoffs. The No. 2 seed went to the New England Patriots (12–4), who topped the AFC East. The Cincinnati Bengals and Indianapolis Colts (both 11–5) captured the North and South divisional titles and took the No. 3 and No. 4 seeds, respectively. The Kansas City Chiefs (11–5) and San Diego Chargers (9–7), both from the AFC West, captured the wild card spots and took the No. 5 and No. 6 seeds. The defending Super Bowl champion Baltimore Ravens finished 8–8 and placed third in the AFC North, failing to make the playoffs.

In the NFC, the Seattle Seahawks (13–3) of the NFC West took the conference regular season crown and the top seed. The Carolina Panthers (12–4) topped the South division and took the No. 2 seed, while the Philadelphia Eagles (10–6) took the East division crown and captured the No. 3 seed. The No. 4 seed went to the Green Bay Packers (8–7–1), champions of the NFC North. The NFC's wild card spots went to the San Francisco 49ers (12–4) and the New Orleans Saints (11–5), from the West and South divisions.

The playoffs began on January 4, 2014, with two of the four scheduled Wild Card games. A late-game touchdown capping the second-largest comeback in NFL playoffs history propelled the Colts over the Chiefs, 45–44, and a Shayne Graham field goal as time expired sent the Saints past the Eagles on the road, 26–24. The next day saw the other two Wild Card contests, in which the Chargers soundly defeated the Bengals, 27–10, and the 49ers snuck by the Packers, 23–20, by virtue of a Phil Dawson game-winning field goal. The divisional round of the playoffs kicked off on January 11, with a matchup between the NFC's top-seeded Seattle Seahawks and the Wild Card victor New Orleans Saints. The Seahawks' Legion of Boom defense kept New Orleans scoreless until the fourth quarter, and running back Marshawn Lynch found the end zone twice to help Seattle to victory, 23–15. The following AFC game was far less competitive, as running back LeGarrette Blount scored three times before halftime and added a fourth in the final quarter in the Patriots' 43–22 rout of the Colts. On January 12, the divisional round wrapped up with two more games: the NFC's game saw the 49ers upset the Cam Newton-led Panthers, who only managed to find the scoreboard in the second quarter and ultimately fell 10–23. The AFC's contest saw the top-seed Broncos take a 17–0 lead into the fourth quarter against the Chargers, and advance by virtue of a 24–17 victory despite a valiant San Diego comeback.

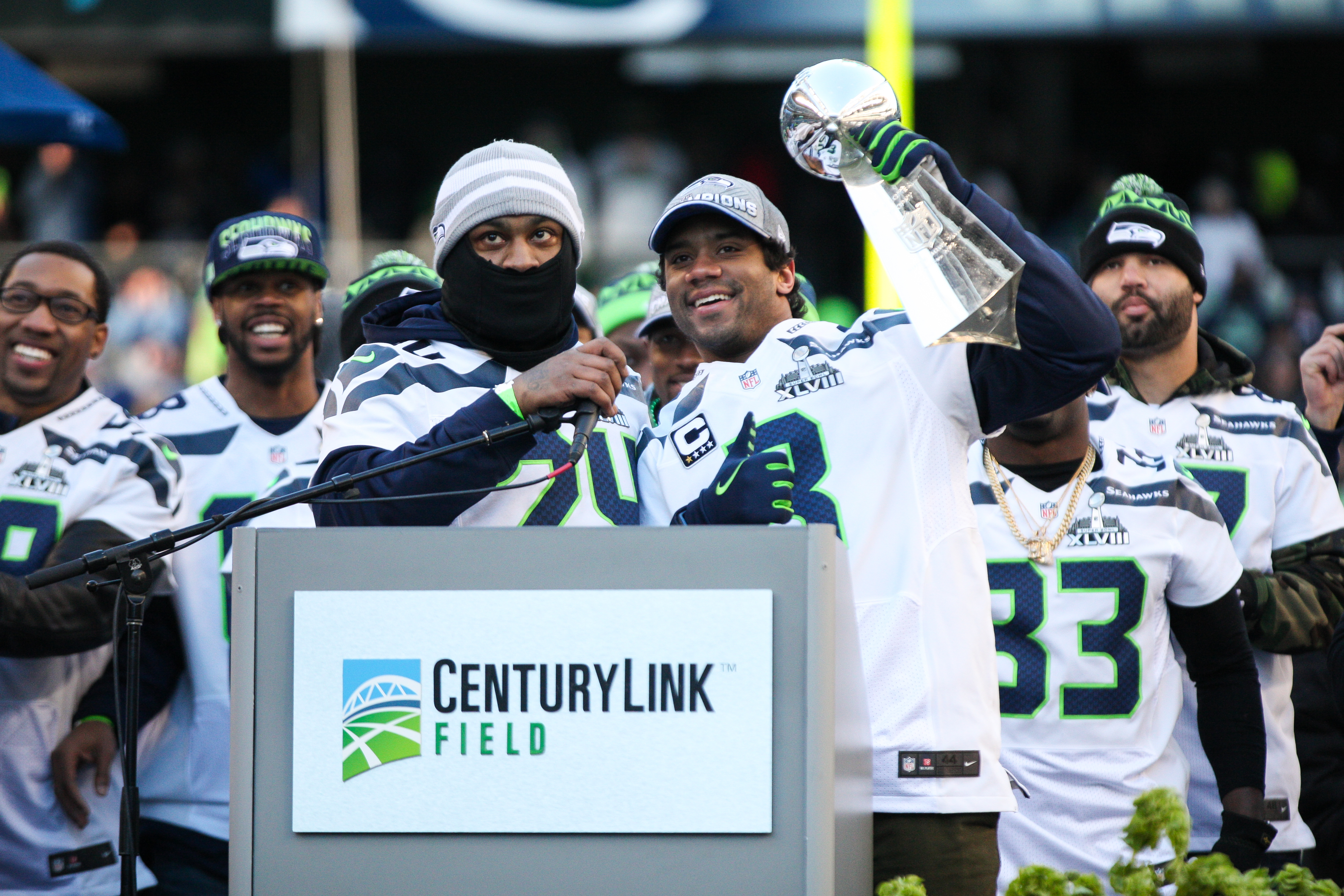
Seattle Seahawks players holding the Vince Lombardi Trophy at a Super Bowl celebration held at CenturyLink Field in Seattle, on February 5, 2014

The divisional rounds now complete, the conference championship games were set to be contested on January 19. First up was the AFC title game, between the top-seed Broncos and the No. 2 seed Patriots. Slow starts from both teams meant that the only points on the board after one quarter were from the boot of Matt Prater, though a couple more Denver scores and a field goal from New England put the halftime score at 13–3 Denver. The Broncos extended their lead in the third quarter and took a 17-point advantage into the fourth, where they fended off a potential comeback bid and took home the victory and Super Bowl berth by a final score of 26–16. The NFC Championship followed, played between No. 1 Seattle and No. 5 San Francisco. The 49ers capitalized on a Russell Wilson fumble on the Seahawks' first drive and jumped out to an early 3–0 lead; San Francisco maintained the lead and took a 10–3 advantage into the break. Touchdowns from both teams and a Seattle field goal put the score at 17–13 in favor of the 49ers, but the Seahawks pass just over a minute into the final quarter put Seattle in the lead for the first time. After a field goal extended the Seahawks' lead to 23–17, the 49ers had possession and were seeking to drive to win the game. On a pass into the end zone from Colin Kaepernick to Michael Crabtree, safety Richard Sherman tipped the pass to teammate Malcolm Smith, who caught it for the game-sealing interception. This play was dubbed the "Immaculate Deflection", or "The Tip", and the game also became notable for Sherman's postgame interview with Erin Andrews.

This set up a matchup between the two No. 1 seeds, the Broncos and the Seahawks, in Super Bowl XLVIII, at MetLife Stadium in East Rutherford, New Jersey. The game was met with cold weather, with kickoff temperatures measuring in the 50s, though they were expected to be up to 10 or 15 degrees colder. The Broncos entered the game as two-point favorites, but faltered as soon as the first play when a shotgun snap went over Peyton Manning's head and was downed in the end zone for a safety, giving the Seahawks an immediate 2–0 advantage. The Seahawks converted two field goals in addition to the safety in the first quarter, which put the score at 8–0 at the quarter's end. Seattle further extended their lead with a pair of second quarter touchdowns, including a Malcolm Smith pick-six, to make the score 22–0 going into halftime. The situation worsened for the Broncos as the third quarter kicked off, as Seattle's lead extended to 29 by virtue of a Percy Harvin kickoff return for a touchdown. Denver managed to score only once in the game, and the contest ended with the Seahawks winning 43–8 and achieving the largest margin of victory by any underdog in a Super Bowl. This was also the Seahawks' first-ever Super Bowl title.

== Other domestic leagues ==
=== Arena Football League ===
The 2013 Arena Football League season, the league's twenty-sixth, began on March 23, 2013. The league played with fourteen teams, down from seventeen the year prior, as the Kansas City Command and Georgia Force folded and the Milwaukee Mustangs suspended their operations for the 2013 season. The regular season's last game was played July 27, and the Jacksonville Sharks and Arizona Rattlers finished as the champions of the American and National conferences, respectively. The Philadelphia Soul and Chicago Rush nabbed the No. 2 seed in their respective conferences, and the remaining 3 and 4 spots went to the two remaining teams in each conference with the best record – in the American conference, the Predators and Storm, in the National conference, the Shock and the SaberCats.

The playoffs commenced on August 1, with a National conference semifinal between No. 2 Chicago and No. 3 Spokane. The game was held in Spokane, despite being originally scheduled for the higher seed's home venue in Chicago, due to what were described as "arena conflicts". Spokane emerged the winner, 67–49. A doubleheader on August 3 saw two teams keep their seasons alive: No. 1 Jacksonville, who defeated No. 4 Tampa Bay by just a touchdown after scoring twice in the game's final eight seconds, and No. 2 Philadelphia, who took down No. 3 Orlando by four points. The final conference semifinal to be played took place on August 4, when No. 1 Arizona defeated No. 4 San Jose by ten.

On August 10, the conference championship games were played. The American conference title game saw No. 2 Philadelphia upset No. 1 Jacksonville, thanks to a 75-point offensive performance, and book their spot in ArenaBowl XXVI. Their opponent was determined shortly thereafter, as the National conference championship saw the top-seeded Rattlers outlast the Spokane Shock, setting up a Soul–Rattlers contest for the ArenaBowl. The 26th edition of the ArenaBowl was won by the Arizona Rattlers, led by All-Arena first team quarterback Nick Davila, by a final score of 48–39. This was the team's fourth championship victory.

=== Indoor Football League ===
The 2013 Indoor Football League season began on February 15, 2013, and the regular season came to a close on June 15. The league played with nine teams, down from sixteen the previous year. The Sioux Falls Storm, the defending IFL champions, finished the regular season with a 10–4 record, and finished champions of the United Conference, while the Intense Conference title went to the 10–4 Nebraska Danger. The runners-up from each conference also made the playoffs, meaning that the Colorado Ice and the Cedar Rapids Titans (both 9–5) made the playoffs as well. The Tri-Cities Fever, who made the 2012 United Bowl and finished as the league's runners-up, finished the regular season at 6–8 and failed to make the postseason.

In the semifinals, both top seeds prevailed; Nebraska defeated Colorado 55–50, and Sioux Falls beat Cedar Rapids 44–20, to set up a 2013 United Bowl matchup between the two conference champions. In the title game, the Danger, led by league MVP Jameel Sewell at quarterback, fell to the Storm by a slim three point margin, giving Sioux Falls their third consecutive IFL title and their seventh league championship in the team's history, dating back to their four consecutive United Indoor Football championships from 2005–08.

=== American Indoor Football ===
2013 AIF team locations
Note: West Virginia played as a travel-only team.

The 2013 American Indoor Football season was the league's eighth. Five teams competed, down from twelve members that competed during the 2012 season. The Cape Fear Heroes and Harrisburg Stampede were the only two teams to return in their same name and location for 2013, with the Virginia Badgers returning as the West Virginia Badgers. Two new teams, the York Capitals and the Washington Eagles, joined the league as well.

The Cape Fear Heroes, who finished the 2012 campaign with a perfect 9–0 record and a league championship, returned to dominance, finishing the regular season with a 7–1 mark and the league regular season title. The Harrisburg Stampede finished in a close second, clinching the Wild Card No. 2 seed with a 6–2 record. The final playoff spot went to the York Capitals, who finished 5–3. The Washington Eagles and the West Virginia Badgers both finished the season without a win: the former 0–8 and the latter 0–4, due to their status as a travel-only team. The playoff structure saw the top-seeded Heroes earn an automatic championship game berth, and the Stampede and Capitals play in a Wild Card game to determine who would face the Heroes. The Stampede, led by Offensive Player of the Year quarterback E. J. Nemeth, defeated York 51–41 and advanced to the championship. Harrisburg kept up the good form in the championship game and defeated Cape Fear to win AIF Championship Bowl VI, by a score of 57–42. This was the team's first championship.

=== Champions Professional Indoor Football League ===
2013 CPIFL team locations

The 2013 season was the first of an eventual two for the Champions Professional Indoor Football League. Founded the year prior, the league began its inaugural season on March 9, 2013 with ten teams from throughout the midwestern United States. The winners of the inaugural game, the Wichita Wild, would go on to finish the season with a 10–2 record, as did the Sioux City Bandits and Omaha Beef. The final playoff team was the Salina Bombers, who finished the regular season 9–3. Wichita defeated Omaha, 31–25, and Salina defeated Sioux Falls, 29–26, in the semifinals. The league championship game, dubbed the Champions Bowl, was played on June 22 at Wichita's home arena, Hartman Arena, in Park City, Kansas. In the championship game, the Wild, led by Champions Bowl MVP Rocky Hinds, defeated the Bombers, 47–34, to win the title.

=== Continental Indoor Football League ===
2013 CIFL team locations

The 2013 Continental Indoor Football League season was the league's eighth. The regular season lasted from February 8 to April 23. The defending champions, the Saginaw Sting, finished the regular season third with a record of 8–2. They were bested by the top-seed Erie Explosion, who took the league regular season championship with a perfect 10–0 record, which included a season-closing 95–0 shutout over the Flint Fury, a semi-pro team. The No. 2 seed was claimed by the Dayton Sharks, who also finished 8–2, and the final playoff spot went to the 7–3 Kentucky Xtreme. Incidentally, the four playoff teams were the only four that finished the season with winning records; the Detroit Thunder and the Port Huron Patriots both finished one game below .500 at 4–6.

In the playoffs, the Explosion faced the Extreme and easily advanced to the title game with a 55–6 win, while the No. 3 Sting upset the No. 2 Sharks to return to the championship game by a mere three points, 66–63. This set up a championship matchup between Erie, making their first title game appearance, and Saginaw, defending champions making their third appearance, also having won in 2008. After falling behind early, Saginaw led the contest at halftime, 22–17. Erie started the third quarter with a pair of scores to take the lead, 30–22, but Saginaw answered with two scores of their own to retake the lead. Only with under two minutes to play did Erie retake the lead for the final time, as running back Richard Stokes found the end zone to give Erie the championship, 37–36.

=== Professional Indoor Football League ===
2013 PIFL team locations

The 2013 PIFL season, the second in the league's history, began on March 8, 2013. The league played with seven teams, up from six from its inaugural season, with the addition of the Lehigh Valley Steelhawks. On May 25, just fifteen days before the end of the regular season, the Louisiana Swashbucklers declared bankruptcy, citing low ticket sales. Louisiana's home game the next day against Alabama was cancelled, and the Swashbucklers played their last three games, all away, before formally folding.

The top spot in the PIFL playoffs went to the Alabama Hammers, who finished 9–2, an improvement from their three-win season in 2012. The Lehigh Valley Steelhawks, the league's newcomers, nabbed the second-place spot with a 7–5 season. The defending champion Richmond Raiders, coming off of a ten-win regular season the year prior, ended the regular season just 7–5 in 2013, capturing the third spot, and the fourth spot also went to a 7–5 team, the Albany Panthers. Louisiana (5–6), Columbus (4–8), and Knoxville (2–10) all missed the playoffs. In the semifinals, the No. 1 Hammers took down No. 4 Albany, 61–46, and No. 3 Richmond pulled the upset over No. 2 Lehigh Valley to book a return to the title game, 44–40. The league championship, dubbed PIFL Cup II, was played on July 8 at the Von Braun Center in Huntsville, Alabama. The Hammers managed to fend off the challenge from the Raiders, and took home the championship, by a score of 70–44.

=== LFL US ===
2013 LFL team locations
Eastern Conference (ATL, BAL, CLE, JAX, OMA, PHI)
Western Conference (CHI, GB, LV, LA, MIN, SEA)

The 2013 LFL US season was the fifth in the league's history, but the first under the name "Legends Football League". Twelve teams competed, split into two conferences (Eastern and Western) each containing two divisions (Southeastern and Northeastern; Midwestern and Pacific). Each team played a four-game regular season, against all but one of the teams in their conference. The regular season began on March 30, with a contest between the Atlanta Steam and the Jacksonville Breeze, and concluded on August 10 with a game between the Chicago Bliss and the Green Bay Chill.

At the regular season's conclusion, the Baltimore Charm sat atop the Eastern Conference with a 3–1 record, while the Seattle Mist won the Western Conference title at 4–0. Those two teams automatically qualified for the playoff semifinals, while their opponents were to be decided in the divisional round. The Atlanta Steam and the Philadelphia Passion (both 2–1–1) made the divisional round from the Eastern Conference, while the Chicago Bliss (3–1) and the Los Angeles Temptation (2–1–1) qualified from the Western Conference. The playoffs began on August 17 with the divisional round, which saw Philadelphia beat Atlanta, 28–20, and Chicago defeat Los Angeles, 19–12. Philadelphia and Chicago then advanced to the conference championships, to be played on August 24. In the semifinals, Philadelphia upset Baltimore by a point, and Chicago defeated Seattle by 17, putting the Passion and the Bliss in the championship game, the Legends Cup. The league championship was played on September 1, at Orleans Arena in Paradise, Nevada, and saw Chicago defeat Philadelphia, 38–14, to win the league for the first time in team history.

=== Ultimate Indoor Football League ===
2013 UIFL team locations
Note: Sarasota played as a travel-only team.

The 2013 UIFL season was the third in league history. Six teams contested the 2013 season, down from ten the year prior. The regular season began on March 8, and concluded on June 4 with the defending league runners-up, the Florida Tarpons, leading the league at 5–1 and capturing the first of three available playoff spots. The second spot was won by the Corpus Christi Fury, an expansion team that finished 6–1, and the third went to the Lakeland Raiders, who finished 6–3. The Missouri Monsters (5–5) and the Georgia Rampage (3–5) both missed the playoffs, as did the Sarasota Thunder, who finished the season having only played three games, all of which ended in shutout losses; their other four scheduled games were cancelled.

The UIFL's three-team playoff began with the semifinal game on June 2, between the Lakeland Raiders and the Corpus Christi Fury. The Fury defeated the Raiders, 58–48, and advanced to the league championship. The title game, dubbed Ultimate Bowl III, was played on June 8 between the No. 1 Florida Tarpons and the No. 2 Corpus Christi Fury at the Germain Arena at Estero, Florida. The Tarpons won the game, 40–32, to capture their first league championship in team history.

== International leagues ==
=== Belgian Football League ===
2013 Belgian Football League team locations
FFL (ANT, GHE, IZG, LVN, PUR)
LFFAB (AND, CHA, LGE, LLN, LUX, TRN, WTR)
BRU: Brussels teams ( BBL, BBA, BTG)

The 2013 BFL season was the twenty-seventh in the history of the league, the top flight American football league in Belgium. Fifteen teams competed, and were divided into two conferences, the Flemish American Football League (FAFL) and the Ligue Francophone de Football Americain de Belgique (LFFAB). The top three seeds in each conference gained playoff berths; those teams were determined upon the conclusion of the regular season. In the FFL, the Brussels Bulls repeated as conference champions, finishing the regular season 6–0. The Brussels Black Angels finished runners-up at 5–1, and the Puurs Titans claimed the final spot with a 3–2 record. In the LFFAB, the BFL's defending champions, the Brussels Tigers (7–0) took the top spot, winning their fourth consecutive conference championship. The Louvain-la-Neuve Fighting Turtles (6–1) and the Liège Monarchs (4–3) also earned playoff berths, as the No. 2 and No. 3 seeds, respectively.

The playoffs began with the quarterfinal round on May 12. The FFL's quarterfinal saw the Black Angels defeat the Monarchs, while the LFFAB's quarterfinal finished with a 24–2 win for Louvain-la-Neuve over Puurs. The semifinals took place on May 19; Both top seeds prevailed, with the Brussels Bulls setting up a title defense by virtue of a 50–14 victory of Louvain-la-Neuve, and the Brussels Tigers defeating the Brussels Black Angels 37–7 to book their place in the title game. The league championship, Belgian Bowl XXVI, was played on June 2, in Izegem, between the two conference champions. The Brussels Tigers successfully defended their title, as they defeated the Bulls 9–0.

=== German Football League ===
The 2013 German Football League was the competition's thirty-fifth edition. Sixteen teams contested the GFL, the top-flight American football league in Germany, while an additional sixteen contested the second-flight GFL 2. The league's regular season began on May 5 and ran through September 15. At the end of the regular season, the GFL North was led by the New Yorker Lions, while the South was led by the Schwäbisch Hall Unicorns. The top four teams in each conference qualified for the playoffs, meaning that berths from the North also went to the Dresden Monarchs, the Kiel Baltic Hurricanes, and the Berlin Adler, while the South qualified the Marburg Mercenaries, the Munich Cowboys, and the Rhein-Neckar Bandits.

The playoffs began on September 21. In the quarterfinal round, all four of the GFL South teams suffered defeats, which guaranteed a title to a GFL North team. New Yorker and Dresden, the top two seeds from the North, advanced past the semifinals and earned berths in the championship game. German Bowl XXXV was held on October 12 at Friedrich-Ludwig-Jahn-Sportpark in Berlin and saw the Lions defeat the Monarchs, 35–34, to win their thirteenth league title.

The GFL operates with a promotion and relegation system, meaning the last-place team from each conference faces the champions of the respective GFL 2 conference to determine who will play in the top flight the following season. In the GFL North relegation playoff, the last-place Cologne Falcons defeated the GFL 2 North champion Bielefield Bulldogs by a single point on aggregate to keep their place in the GFL. The GFL south last-place finishers, the Wiesbaden Phantoms, were defeated by the GFL 2 South champion Allgäu Comets on aggregate, and were therefore relegated.

=== LFL Canada ===
The 2013 LFL Canada season was planned to have been the second season of the Legends Football League in Canada. Four teams were scheduled to contest the season: the BC Angels, the Calgary Fillies, the Regina Rage, and the Saskatoon Sirens. The season was scheduled to begin on September 13, and the regular season was planned to run through November 9, with the top two teams in the league standings automatically qualifying for the LFL Canada Legends Cup on November 16, held at the Stampede Corral in Calgary. Ultimately, the season was never played; three new coaching staffs from the previous season, a short timeframe for teams to prepare, and safety concerns prompted the cancellation of the season.
