= 2013 Knoxville NightHawks season =

- Owner: Jeff Knight
- Head coach: Cosmo DeMatteo
- Home stadium: James White Civic Coliseum

Results
- Record: 2–10
- League place: 7th
- Playoffs: Did not qualify

The 2013 Knoxville NightHawks season was the second and final season for the professional indoor football franchise and their second in the Professional Indoor Football League (PIFL). The NightHawks were one of seven teams that competed in the PIFL for the 2013 season.

The team played their home games under head coach Cosmo DeMatteo at the James White Civic Coliseum in Knoxville, Tennessee. The NightHawks earned a 2–10 record, placing seventh in the league, failing to qualify for the playoffs.

== Schedule ==
Key: Win Tie Loss Bye

=== Regular season ===
All start times are local to home team

Week	Day	Date	Kickoff	Opponent	Results		Location
Week	Day	Date	Kickoff	Opponent	Score	Record	Location
1	Sunday	March 10	4:00pm	at Columbus Lions	L 28–58	0–1	Columbus Civic Center
2	Sunday	March 17	4:00pm	at Lehigh Valley Steelhawks	L 45–63	0–2	Stabler Arena
3	Saturday	March 23	7:05pm	at Richmond Raiders	L 23–41	0–3	Richmond Coliseum
4	Saturday	March 30	7:00pm	Richmond Raiders	L 36–51	0–4	James White Civic Coliseum
5	Saturday	April 6	7:05pm	Albany Panthers	W 31–28	1–4	James White Civic Coliseum
6	BYE						
7	Saturday	April 20	7:05pm	at Louisiana Swashbucklers	L 27–36	1–5	Sudduth Coliseum
8	Saturday	April 27	7:00pm	at Alabama Hammers	W 53–51	2–5	Von Braun Center
9	Saturday	May 4	7:00pm	Louisiana Swashbucklers	L 37–45	2–6	James White Civic Coliseum
10	Saturday	May 11	7:00pm	Lehigh Valley Steelhawks	L 47–63	2–7	James White Civic Coliseum
11	BYE						
12	Saturday	May 25	7:00pm	at Lehigh Valley Steelhawks	L 42–67	2–8	Stabler Arena
13	BYE						
14	Friday	June 7	7:30pm	Louisiana Swashbucklers	L 20–58	2–9	James White Civic Coliseum
15	Saturday	June 15	7:00pm	Alabama Hammers	L 32–55	2–10	James White Civic Coliseum
16	BYE						

== Roster ==
2013 Knoxville NightHawks roster
Quarterbacks: 8 Luke Collis; 9 Anthony Speight; Running backs: 6 Daccus Turman; Wide receivers: 10 Kelvin Boldin; 4 DeAndre Brown; 14 Charles Gilbert; 1 Rico Joseph; 20 Ryan Schuck	Offensive linemen: 72 Dominique Bacon; 55 R. J. Bibbs; 78 Carnell Stewart; Defensive linemen: 62 Adrien Cole; 99 Armand Johnson; 91 Justin Wells	Linebackers: 33 Roosevelt Falls; 7 Sam Fehoko; Defensive backs: 2 Kirkland Davidson; 23 Derrick Furlow; 22 Victor Rogers; Kickers: 18 Armando Cuko	Injured reserve: Currently vacant; Exempt list: Currently vacant; Practice squad: Currently vacant; Rookies in italics updated June 15, 2014; 20 Active, 0 Inactive, 0 PS → More rosters

== Division standings ==
2013 Professional Indoor Football League
Team	W	L	T	PCT	PF	PA	PF (Avg.)	PA (Avg.)	STK
y-Alabama Hammers	9	2	0	.818	631	454	57.4	41.3	W4
x-Lehigh Valley Steelhawks	7	5	0	.583	667	598	55.6	49.8	W1
x-Richmond Raiders	7	5	0	.583	603	605	50.3	50.4	W1
x-Albany Panthers	7	5	0	.583	574	518	47.8	43.2	W1
Louisiana Swashbucklers	5	6	0	.455	497	524	45.2	47.6	L1
Columbus Lions	4	8	0	.333	543	621	45.3	51.8	L2
Knoxville NightHawks	2	10	0	.167	421	616	35.1	51.3	L5
