= 2013 Alabama Hammers season =

Football season

- Owner: Jeff Knight
- Head coach: Dean Cokinos
- Home stadium: Von Braun Center

Results
- Record: 9–2
- League place: 1st
- Playoffs: Won Semifinals (Albany) 61–46; Won PIFL Cup II (Richmond) 70–44

The 2013 Alabama Hammers season was the third season for the professional indoor football franchise and their second in the Professional Indoor Football League (PIFL). The Hammers were of seven teams that competed in the PIFL for the 2013 season.

The team played their home games under head coach Dean Cokinos at the Von Braun Center in Huntsville, Alabama. The Hammers earned a 9–2 record, placing first in the league, winning PIFL Cup II 70–44 over the Richmond Raiders.

== Schedule ==
Key: Win Tie Loss Bye

=== Regular season ===
All start times are local to home team

Week	Day	Date	Kickoff	Opponent	Results		Location
Week	Day	Date	Kickoff	Opponent	Score	Record	Location
1	Friday	March 8	7:30pm	Lehigh Valley Steelhawks	W 29–28	1–0	Von Braun Center
2	Saturday	March 16	7:06pm	at Richmond Raiders	W 65–23	2–0	Richmond Coliseum
3	Saturday	March 23	7:05pm	at Albany Panthers	L 51–64	2–1	James H. Gray Civic Center
4	BYE						
5	Saturday	April 6	7:00pm	Columbus Lions	W 72–45	3–1	Von Braun Center
6	Saturday	April 13	7:00pm	Albany Panthers	W 51–38	4–1	Von Braun Center
7	Saturday	April 20	7:05pm	at Lehigh Valley Steelhawks	W 79–77	5–1	Stabler Arena
8	Saturday	April 27	7:00pm	Knoxville NightHawks	L 51–53	5–2	Von Braun Center
9	BYE						
10	BYE						
11	Saturday	May 18	7:30pm	at Columbus Lions	W 70–43	6–2	Columbus Civic Center
12	Saturday	May 25	7:00pm	at Louisiana Swashbucklers	Cancelled (Note: The Alabama vs. Louisiana game scheduled for May 25 was cancelled after the Swashbucklers declared bankruptcy. The game was not made up, as it did not have an effect on playoff seeding later in the season.)		Sudduth Coliseum
13	Saturday	June 1	7:00pm	Louisiana Swashbucklers	W 63–22	7–2	Von Braun Center
14	Saturday	June 8	7:00pm	Richmond Raiders	W 45–29	8–2	Von Braun Center
15	Saturday	June 15	7:00pm	at Knoxville NightHawks	W 55–32	9–2	James White Civic Coliseum
16	BYE						

=== Postseason ===
Round	Day	Date	Kickoff	Opponent	Results		Location
Round	Day	Date	Kickoff	Opponent	Score	Record	Location
Semifinals	Monday	July 1	7:00pm	Albany Panthers	W 61–46	1–0	Von Braun Center
PIFL Cup II	Monday	July 8	7:00pm	Richmond Raiders	W 70–44	2–0	Von Braun Center

== Roster ==
2013 Alabama Hammers roster
Quarterbacks: 12 Russell Hill; Running backs: 42 Dan Ross; Wide receivers: 10 Jeremy Grier; 8 C. J. Johnson; 3 Charles McClain; 4 Mico McSwain; 1 Larry Shipp	Offensive linemen: 62 Chucky Curry; 53 Bruce McCaleb; 70 Ray Norell; Defensive linemen: 11 Darian Barnes; 19 Caleb Bostic; 33 B. J. Chappell; 44 Benji McDowell	Linebackers: 22 Jake Trantin; Defensive backs: 7 Travis Blanchard; 6 Vince Hill; 18 Cortez Stubbs; Kickers: 20 Brian Jackson	Injured reserve: Currently vacant; Exempt list: Currently vacant; Practice squad: Currently vacant; Rookies in italics Roster updated June 15, 2013; 19 Active, 0 Inactive, 0 PS → More rosters

== Division standings ==
2013 Professional Indoor Football League
Team	W	L	T	PCT	PF	PA	PF (Avg.)	PA (Avg.)	STK
y-Alabama Hammers	9	2	0	.818	631	454	57.4	41.3	W4
x-Lehigh Valley Steelhawks	7	5	0	.583	667	598	55.6	49.8	W1
x-Richmond Raiders	7	5	0	.583	603	605	50.3	50.4	W1
x-Albany Panthers	7	5	0	.583	574	518	47.8	43.2	W1
Louisiana Swashbucklers	5	6	0	.455	497	524	45.2	47.6	L1
Columbus Lions	4	8	0	.333	543	621	45.3	51.8	L2
Knoxville NightHawks	2	10	0	.167	421	616	35.1	51.3	L5
