= 2013 Lehigh Valley Steelhawks season =

- Owner: Glenn W. Clark
- General manager: Michael Clark
- Head coach: Chris Thompson
- Home stadium: Stabler Arena

Results
- Record: 7-5
- League place: T-2nd
- Playoffs: Lost Semifinals (Richmond) 40-44

The 2013 Lehigh Valley Steelhawks season was the third season as a professional indoor football franchise and their first in the Professional Indoor Football League (PIFL). One of 7 teams competing in the PIFL for the 2013 season.

The team played their home games under head coach Chris Thompson at the Stabler Arena in Bethlehem, Pennsylvania. The Steelhawks earned a 7-5 record, placing tied for 2nd in the league and qualifying for the playoffs. They were defeated in the Semifinals, 40-44 by the Richmond Raiders.

== Schedule ==
Key: Win Tie Loss Bye

=== Regular season ===
All start times are local to home team

| Week | Day | Date | Kickoff | Opponent | Results | | Location |
| Week | Day | Date | Kickoff | Opponent | Score | Record | Location |
|---|---|---|---|---|---|---|---|
| 1 | Friday | March 8 | 7:30pm | at Alabama Hammers | L 28-29 | 0–1 | Von Braun Center |
| 2 | Sunday | March 17 | 4:00pm | Knoxville NightHawks | W 63-45 | 1–1 | Stabler Arena |
| 3 | Saturday | March 23 | 7:05pm | at Louisiana Swashbucklers | W 44-22 | 2–1 | Sudduth Coliseum |
| 4 | BYE | | | | | | |
| 5 | BYE | | | | | | |
| 6 | Saturday | April 13 | 7:00pm | at Richmond Raiders | L 51-62 | 2–2 | Richmond Coliseum |
| 7 | Saturday | April 20 | 7:05pm | Alabama Hammers | L 77-79 | 2–3 | Stabler Arena |
| 8 | Saturday | April 27 | 7:05pm | Richmond Raiders | L 64-66 | 2-4 | Stabler Arena |
| 9 | Sunday | May 5 | 4:05pm | Columbus Lions | W 60-51 | 3-4 | Stabler Arena |
| 10 | Saturday | May 11 | 7:00pm | at Knoxville NightHawks | W 63-47 | 4-4 | James White Civic Coliseum |
| 11 | Saturday | May 18 | 7:00pm | Albany Panthers | W 49-47 | 5-4 | Stabler Arena |
| 12 | Saturday | May 25 | 7:00pm | Knoxville NightHawks | W 67-42 | 6–4 | Stabler Arena |
| 13 | Sunday | June 2 | 7:00pm | at Columbus Lions | L 48-59 | 6-5 | Columbus Civic Center |
| 14 | BYE | | | | | | |
| 15 | Saturday | June 15 | 7:05pm | at Albany Panthers | W 39-24 | 7-5 | James H. Gray Civic Center |
| 16 | BYE | | | | | | |

=== Postseason ===
| Round | Day | Date | Kickoff | Opponent | Results | | Location |
| Round | Day | Date | Kickoff | Opponent | Score | Record | Location |
|---|---|---|---|---|---|---|---|
| Semifinals | Monday | July 1 | 7:00pm | at Richmond Raiders | L 40-44 | 0-1 | Richmond Coliseum |

== Roster ==
2013 Lehigh Valley Steelhawks roster
| Quarterbacks: 11 Adam Bednarik; 8 Hunter Wanket; Running backs: 10 Ian Simon; Wide receivers: 6 Torieal Gibson; 1 Tom Gilson; 21 Troy Pascley | Offensive linemen: 72 Travis Miller; 75 Jeremy Schonbrunner; 58 Michael Simons; Defensive linemen: 92 Larry Ford; 99 Eddie Smith; 97 Bryan Wick | Linebackers: 54 Terence Thomas; 33 E. J. Webb; Defensive backs: 22 Alexander Ajayi; 3 Chris Johnson; 13 John Kennedy III; Kickers: 4 Jon Striefsky | Injured Reserve: currently vacant; Exempt List: currently vacant; Practice squad: currently vacant; Roster updated July 1, 2013; 18 Active, 0 Inactive, 0 PS → More rosters |

== Division Standings ==
2013 Professional Indoor Football League
| Team | W | L | T | PCT | PF | PA | PF (Avg.) | PA (Avg.) | STK |
|---|---|---|---|---|---|---|---|---|---|
| y-Alabama Hammers | 9 | 2 | 0 | .818 | 631 | 454 | 57.4 | 41.3 | W4 |
| x-Lehigh Valley Steelhawks | 7 | 5 | 0 | .583 | 667 | 598 | 55.6 | 49.8 | W1 |
| x-Richmond Raiders | 7 | 5 | 0 | .583 | 603 | 605 | 50.3 | 50.4 | W1 |
| x-Albany Panthers | 7 | 5 | 0 | .583 | 574 | 518 | 47.8 | 43.2 | W1 |
| Louisiana Swashbucklers | 5 | 6 | 0 | .455 | 497 | 524 | 45.2 | 47.6 | L1 |
| Columbus Lions | 4 | 8 | 0 | .333 | 543 | 621 | 45.3 | 51.8 | L2 |
| Knoxville NightHawks | 2 | 10 | 0 | .167 | 421 | 616 | 35.1 | 51.3 | L5 |
