= 2013 Albany Panthers season =

- Owner: Rod Chappell
- General manager: Will Carter
- Head coach: Lucious Davis
- Home stadium: James H. Gray Civic Center

Results
- Record: 7-5
- League place: 4th
- Playoffs: Lost Semifinals (Alabama) 46-61

The 2013 Albany Panthers season was the fourth season as a professional indoor football franchise and their second in the Professional Indoor Football League (PIFL). The 2013 season ended up being the final season for the Panthers, who lost their lease at the James H. Gray Civic Center following the season. One of 7 teams competing in the PIFL for the 2013 season.

The team played their home games under head coach Lucious Davis at the James H. Gray Civic Center in Albany, Georgia. The Panthers earned a 7-5 record, placing 4th in the league.

== Schedule ==
Key: Win Tie Loss Bye

=== Regular season ===
All start times are local to home team

| Week | Day | Date | Kickoff | Opponent | Results | | Location |
| Week | Day | Date | Kickoff | Opponent | Score | Record | Location |
|---|---|---|---|---|---|---|---|
| 1 | Saturday | March 9 | 7:05pm | at Louisiana Swashbucklers | W 51-40 | 1-0 | Sudduth Coliseum |
| 2 | Saturday | March 16 | 7:06pm | Columbus Lions | W 40-37 | 2-0 | James H. Gray Civic Center |
| 3 | Saturday | March 23 | 7:05pm | Alabama Hammers | W 64-51 | 3-0 | James H. Gray Civic Center |
| 4 | BYE | | | | | | |
| 5 | Saturday | April 6 | 7:00pm | at Knoxville NightHawks | L 28-31 | 3-1 | James White Civic Coliseum |
| 6 | Saturday | April 13 | 7:00pm | at Alabama Hammers | L 38-51 | 3-2 | Von Braun Center |
| 7 | BYE | | | | | | |
| 8 | BYE | | | | | | |
| 9 | Saturday | May 4 | 7:05pm | at Richmond Raiders | L 49-51 | 3-3 | Richmond Coliseum |
| 10 | Saturday | May 11 | 7:00pm | Louisiana Swashbucklers | W 45-42 | 4-3 | James H. Gray Civic Center |
| 11 | Saturday | May 18 | 7:30pm | at Lehigh Valley Steelhawks | L 47-49 | 4-4 | Stabler Arena |
| 12 | BYE | | | | | | |
| 13 | Saturday | June 1 | 7:00pm | Richmond Raiders | W 69-63 OT | 5-4 | James H. Gray Civic Center |
| 14 | Saturday | June 8 | 7:00pm | at Columbus Lions | W 35-15 | 6-4 | Columbus Civic Center |
| 15 | Saturday | June 15 | 7:00pm | Lehigh Valley Steelhawks | L 49-53 | 6-5 | James H. Gray Civic Center |
| 16 | Saturday | June 22 | 7:00pm | Columbus Lions | W 59-35 | 7-5 | James H. Gray Civic Center |

=== Postseason ===
| Round | Day | Date | Kickoff | Opponent | Results | | Location |
| Round | Day | Date | Kickoff | Opponent | Score | Record | Location |
|---|---|---|---|---|---|---|---|
| Semifinals | Monday | July 1 | 7:00pm | at Alabama Hammers | L 46-61 | 0-1 | Von Braun Center |

== Roster ==
2013 Albany Panthers roster
| Quarterbacks: 7 Cecil Lester; Running backs: 2 Derrick Wimbush; Wide receivers: 8 Antwontis Cutts; 5 Damian Daniels; 4 John Harris; 24 Johnny Lester; 1 Clenton Rafe | Offensive linemen: 52 Demetrius Jackson; 59 Rory Nixon; 70 Ray Norell; Defensive linemen: 34 Chauncey DeBose; 22 Tito Hannah; 55 Alton Pettway | Linebackers: 31 Larry Edwards; Defensive backs: 23 Demetrie McCray; 3 Levan Richmond; 21 Corey Rue; Kickers: 10 Ryan Gates | Injured reserve: currently vacant; Exempt list: currently vacant; Practice squad: currently vacant; rookies in italics Roster updated July 1, 2013; 18 Active, 0 Inactive, 0 PS → More rosters |

== Division Standings ==
2013 Professional Indoor Football League
| Team | W | L | T | PCT | PF | PA | PF (Avg.) | PA (Avg.) | STK |
|---|---|---|---|---|---|---|---|---|---|
| y-Alabama Hammers | 9 | 2 | 0 | .818 | 631 | 454 | 57.4 | 41.3 | W4 |
| x-Lehigh Valley Steelhawks | 7 | 5 | 0 | .583 | 667 | 598 | 55.6 | 49.8 | W1 |
| x-Richmond Raiders | 7 | 5 | 0 | .583 | 603 | 605 | 50.3 | 50.4 | W1 |
| x-Albany Panthers | 7 | 5 | 0 | .583 | 574 | 518 | 47.8 | 43.2 | W1 |
| Louisiana Swashbucklers | 5 | 6 | 0 | .455 | 497 | 524 | 45.2 | 47.6 | L1 |
| Columbus Lions | 4 | 8 | 0 | .333 | 543 | 621 | 45.3 | 51.8 | L2 |
| Knoxville NightHawks | 2 | 10 | 0 | .167 | 421 | 616 | 35.1 | 51.3 | L5 |

| Preceded by 2012 | Albany Panthers seasons 2013 | Succeeded by Folded |
