= Charles Gilbert (American football) =

American football player (born 1987)

Profile
- Position: Wide receiver

Personal information
- Born: May 18, 1987 (age 39); Jacksonville, Florida, U.S.
- Listed height: 6 ft 0 in (1.83 m)
- Listed weight: 190 lb (86 kg)

Career information
- High school: Orange Park (FL) Ridgeview
- College: Concordia-St. Paul
- NFL draft: 2012: undrafted

Career history
- St. Louis Rams (2012)*; Jacksonville Sharks (2013)*; Knoxville NightHawks (2013); Columbus Lions (2014); Jacksonville Sharks (2014–2015); New Orleans VooDoo (2015)
- * Offseason or practice squad member only

Career AFL statistics
- Receptions: 14
- Receiving yards: 183
- Receiving TDs: 3
- Stats at ArenaFan.com

Charles Gilbert (born May 18, 1987) is an American former football wide receiver. He played college football at Concordia University in Saint Paul, Minnesota.
