= 2013 Richmond Raiders season =

American indoor football team season

- Owner: Mike & Elizabeth Fraizer
- Head coach: James Fuller
- Home stadium: Richmond Coliseum

Results
- Record: 7-5
- League place: T-2nd
- Playoffs: Won Semifinals (Lehigh Valley) 44-40; Lost PIFL Cup II (Alabama Hammers) 44-70

The 2013 Richmond Raiders season was the fourth season as a professional indoor football franchise and their second in the Professional Indoor Football League (PIFL). One of 7 teams competing in the PIFL for the 2013 season.

The team played their home games under head coach James Fuller at the Richmond Coliseum in Richmond, Virginia. The Raiders earned a 7–5 record, placing tied for 2nd in the league, qualifying for the playoffs. They were defeated in PIFL Cup II, 44–70 by the Alabama Hammers.

== Schedule ==
Key: Win Tie Loss Bye

=== Regular season ===
All start times are local to home team

Week	Day	Date	Kickoff	Opponent	Results		Location	Attendance
Week	Day	Date	Kickoff	Opponent	Score	Record	Location	Attendance
1	BYE							
2	Saturday	March 16	7:00pm	Alabama Hammers	L 23–65	0–1	Richmond Coliseum	3,122
3	Saturday	March 23	7:05pm	Knoxville NightHawks	W 41–23	1–1	Richmond Coliseum	2,779
4	Saturday	March 30	7:00pm	at Knoxville NightHawks	W 51–36	2–1	James White Civic Coliseum	1,185
5	BYE							
6	Saturday	April 13	7:00pm	Lehigh Valley Steelhawks	W 62–51	3–1	Richmond Coliseum	3,117
7	Saturday	April 20	7:05pm	at Columbus Lions	L 42–48	3–2	Columbus Civic Center	2,189
8	Saturday	April 27	7:05pm	at Lehigh Valley Steelhawks	W 66–64	4–2	Stabler Arena	1,954
9	Saturday	May 4	7:00pm	Albany Panthers	W 51–49	5–2	Richmond Coliseum	3,418
10	BYE							
11	Saturday	May 18	7:00pm	at Louisiana Swashbucklers	L 66-68 (OT)	5–3	Sudduth Coliseum	
12	Saturday	May 25	7:00pm	Columbus Lions	W 48-42 (OT)	6–3	Richmond Coliseum	3,679
13	Saturday	June 1	7:00pm	at Albany Panthers	L 63-69 (OT)	6–4	Albany Civic Center	
14	Saturday	June 8	7:00pm	at Alabama Hammers	L 29–45	6–5	Von Braun Center	3,159
15	Saturday	June 15	7:05pm	Louisiana Swashbucklers	W 61–45	7–5	Richmond Coliseum	4,079
16	BYE							

=== Postseason ===
Round	Day	Date	Kickoff	Opponent	Results		Location	Attendance
Round	Day	Date	Kickoff	Opponent	Score	Record	Location	Attendance
Semifinals	Monday	July 1	7:00pm	Lehigh Valley Steelhawks	W 44–40	1–0	Richmond Coliseum	3,777
PIFL Cup II	Monday	July 8	7:00pm	at Alabama Hammers	L 44–70	1-1	Von Braun Center	3,133

== Roster ==
2013 Richmond Raiders roster
Quarterbacks: 8 Warren Smith; Running backs: 32 Rodney Sledge; Wide receivers: 12 Gerron Bryant; 5 Herb Jones; 6 Jason Lovett; 3 Hakeem Moore; 1 Antwuan Williams	Offensive linemen: 77 James Carter; 55 Brandon Grier; 78 Kynneth Moses; 63 Nick Royal; 52 Derek Stoudt; Defensive linemen: 94 Jason Holman; 90 Brandon Sutton	Linebackers: 56 Preston Hines; Defensive backs: 21 Kevin Allen; 11 RoShawn Marshall; 2 Davon Morgan; 31 Maurice Thorne; Kickers: 18 T. C. Stevens	Injured Reserve: currently vacant; Exempt List: currently vacant; Practice squad: currently vacant; Roster updated July 8, 2013; 20 Active, 0 Inactive, 0 PS → More rosters

== Division Standings ==
2013 Professional Indoor Football League
Team	W	L	T	PCT	PF	PA	PF (Avg.)	PA (Avg.)	STK
y-Alabama Hammers	9	2	0	.818	631	454	57.4	41.3	W4
x-Lehigh Valley Steelhawks	7	5	0	.583	667	598	55.6	49.8	W1
x-Richmond Raiders	7	5	0	.583	603	605	50.3	50.4	W1
x-Albany Panthers	7	5	0	.583	574	518	47.8	43.2	W1
Louisiana Swashbucklers	5	6	0	.455	497	524	45.2	47.6	L1
Columbus Lions	4	8	0	.333	543	621	45.3	51.8	L2
Knoxville NightHawks	2	10	0	.167	421	616	35.1	51.3	L5
