= Chris Bradwell =

American gridiron football player (born 1983)

Profile
- Position: Defensive tackle

Personal information
- Born: December 17, 1983 (age 42); Jacksonville, Florida, U.S.
- Listed height: 6 ft 5 in (1.96 m)
- Listed weight: 280 lb (127 kg)

Career information
- College: Troy
- NFL draft: 2008: undrafted

Career history
- Tampa Bay Buccaneers (2008–2009)*; St. Louis Rams (2009–2010)*; Georgia Force (2011)*; Columbus Lions (2011); Toronto Argonauts (2011); Knoxville NightHawks (2012)*; Colorado Ice (2012); Columbus Lions (2013)
- * Offseason or practice squad member only

Awards and highlights
- Sun Belt Newcomer of the Year (2007)

Christopher D. Bradwell (born December 17, 1983) is an American former professional football defensive tackle. He was signed by the Tampa Bay Buccaneers as an undrafted free agent in 2008. He played college football at Troy.

Bradwell was also a member of the St. Louis Rams, Georgia Force, Columbus Lions, Toronto Argonauts, Knoxville NightHawks and Colorado Ice.

== Early life ==
Bradwell attended Chattahoochee High School in Georgia and recorded 95 tackles and 11 sacks as a senior. He Also caught eight passes for 150 yards, and 7 touchdowns while playing tight end, linebacker, defensive end, and defensive tackle. As a junior, he caught 11 passes for 177 yards and one touchdown while logging 173 tackles and six quarterback sacks.

== College career ==
Bradwell appeared in 12 games with nine starts for Troy in 2007 and was named Sun Belt Conference Newcomer of the Year. He finished the season with 36 total tackles, including eight tackles for loss, as well as four sacks, one forced fumble, two fumble recoveries and one pass defensed. He sat out the 2006 season due to a violation of team rules. He played for Northeast Mississippi Community College in 2005 and was named junior college All-American and Defensive Player of the Year in Mississippi in 2005 after recording Recorded 70 tackles, including 10 for loss. He played in four games as a true freshman at Florida State in 2004 and recorded one tackle. He redshirted in 2003.

== Professional career ==
=== Tampa Bay Buccaneers ===
Bradwell entered the league as an undrafted free agent with the Tampa Bay Buccaneers on May 6, 2008. He was released by Tampa Bay on August 30 and signed to the practice squad on December 3. He was released by Tampa Bay on December 17. He was re-signed by the Buccaneers on January 8, 2009.

=== St. Louis Rams ===
Bradwell was signed to the St. Louis Rams' practice squad on October 12, 2009. On January 20, 2010, Bradwell signed a reserve future contract.

=== Georgia Force ===
Bradwell signed with the Georgia Force of the Arena Football League on February 26, 2011. He was released by the team on March 7, 2011.

=== Columbus Lions ===
On March 12, 2011, Bradwell signed with the Columbus Lions of the Southern Indoor Football League.

=== Toronto Argonauts ===
On May 27, 2011, Bradwell signed with the Toronto Argonauts of the Canadian Football League. He was released by the Argonauts on August 12, 2011.
