= 2013 Louisiana Swashbucklers season =

- Owner: Chris Meaux
- Head coach: Darnell Lee
- Home stadium: Sudduth Coliseum

Results
- Record: 5–6
- League place: 5th
- Playoffs: Did not qualify

The 2013 Louisiana Swashbucklers season was the ninth season for the professional indoor football franchise and their second in the Professional Indoor Football League (PIFL). The Swashbucklers were one of seven teams that competed in the PIFL for the 2013 season.

The team played their home games under head coach Darnell Lee at the Sudduth Coliseum in Lake Charles, Louisiana. The Swashbucklers earned a 5–6 record, placing fifth in the league, failing to qualify for the playoffs.

== Schedule ==
Key: Win Tie Loss Bye

=== Regular season ===
All start times are local to home team

Week	Day	Date	Kickoff	Opponent	Results		Location
Week	Day	Date	Kickoff	Opponent	Score	Record	Location
1	Saturday	March 9	4:00pm	Albany Panthers	L 40–51	0–1	Sudduth Coliseum
2	BYE						
3	Saturday	March 23	7:05pm	Lehigh Valley Steelhawks	L 22–44	0–2	Sudduth Coliseum
4	BYE						
5	BYE						
6	Saturday	April 13	7:05pm	Columbus Lions	L 42–45	0–3	Sudduth Coliseum
7	Saturday	April 20	7:05pm	Knoxville NightHawks	W 36–27	1–3	Sudduth Coliseum
8	Saturday	April 27	7:30pm	at Columbus Lions	W 77–65	2–3	Columbus Civic Center
9	Saturday	May 4	7:00pm	at Knoxville NightHawks	W 45–37	3–3	James White Civic Coliseum
10	Saturday	May 11	7:00pm	at Albany Panthers	L 42–45	3–4	James H. Gray Civic Center
11	Saturday	May 18	7:05pm	Richmond Raiders	W 68–66 OT	4–4	Sudduth Coliseum
12	Saturday	May 25	7:00pm	Alabama Hammers	Cancelled (Note: The Alabama vs. Louisiana game scheduled for May 25 was cancelled after the Swashbucklers declared bankruptcy. The Swashbucklers played their final three road games as scheduled, however the Alabama game was not made up, as it did not have an effect on playoff seeding.)		Sudduth Coliseum
13	Saturday	June 1	7:00pm	at Alabama Hammers	L 23–63	4–5	Von Braun Center
14	Friday	June 7	7:30pm	at Knoxville NightHawks	W 58–20	5–5	James White Civic Coliseum
15	Saturday	June 15	7:00pm	at Richmond Raiders	L 45–61	5–6	Richmond Coliseum
16	BYE						

== Roster ==
2013 Louisiana Swashbucklers roster
Quarterbacks: 14 Chris Mitchell; Running backs: 23 Kendrick Perry; Wide receivers: 18 Donald Davis; 17 Sammy Knight; 6 Jordan Rideaux	Offensive linemen: 34 Fred Abraham; 58 Marcus Lindsey; 56 Brandon McElroy; Defensive linemen: 99 Clinton Barley; 45 Eemario Dixon; 92 Tenise Eulese; 90 Melvin Matthews	Linebackers: 32 Josh Newkirk; 42 Robert Russell; Defensive backs: 5 Greg Harvey; 1 Damian Huren; 10 Kenny Kitchen; 3 Justin Howard; Kickers: 19 Ernesto Lacayo	Injured reserve: Currently vacant; Exempt list: Currently vacant; Practice squad: 3 Justin Howard; Rookies in italics Roster updated July 17, 2013; 18 Active, 0 Inactive, 1 PS

== Division standings ==
2013 Professional Indoor Football League
Team	W	L	T	PCT	PF	PA	PF (Avg.)	PA (Avg.)	STK
y-Alabama Hammers	9	2	0	.818	631	454	57.4	41.3	W4
x-Lehigh Valley Steelhawks	7	5	0	.583	667	598	55.6	49.8	W1
x-Richmond Raiders	7	5	0	.583	603	605	50.3	50.4	W1
x-Albany Panthers	7	5	0	.583	574	518	47.8	43.2	W1
Louisiana Swashbucklers	5	6	0	.455	497	524	45.2	47.6	L1
Columbus Lions	4	8	0	.333	543	621	45.3	51.8	L2
Knoxville NightHawks	2	10	0	.167	421	616	35.1	51.3	L5
