= Johnny Lester =

American football player (born 1988)

No. 18
- Position: Wide receiver

Personal information
- Born: February 6, 1988 (age 38); Miami, Florida, U.S.
- Listed height: 5 ft 9 in (1.75 m)
- Listed weight: 175 lb (79 kg)

Career information
- High school: Miami (FL) Southridge
- College: Minot State
- NFL draft: 2011: undrafted

Career history
- Albany Panthers (2013); Georgia Fire (2014); New Orleans VooDoo (2015)

Awards and highlights
- First-team All-PIFL (2014)

Career AFL statistics
- Receptions: 26
- Receiving yards: 281
- Receiving TDs: 6
- Rushing yards: 1
- Rushing TDs: 2
- Stats at ArenaFan.com

Johnny Lester III (born February 6, 1988) is an American former football wide receiver. He played college football at Minot State University.

== Early life ==
Lester attended Miami Southridge High School, in Miami, Florida, where he was a participant in both track and field and football.

== College career ==
Lester signed to play college football and run track at Minot State University. As a freshman in 2006, Lester was redshirted. As a four-year starter he collected 23 receiving, 12 special team, and 2 rushing touchdowns. He holds the conference record for kick return touchdowns in a single season, and school record for 100 meter dash. Lester became a four time All-Conference player, senior All-American, and won the conference Most Valuable Player Award during his time at Minot.

== Professional career ==
=== Albany Panthers ===
In 2013, Lester began his professional career signing with the Albany Panthers of the Professional Indoor Football League.

=== Georgia Fire ===
In 2014, Lester joined the Georgia Fire after the Panthers folded prior to the start of the season.

=== New Orleans VooDoo ===
In April 2015, Lester signed with the New Orleans VooDoo of the Arena Football League. Lester hauled in 26 receptions as a rookie for the VooDoo. When the VooDoo ceased operations on August 9, 2015, Lester became a free agent.
