= Anthony Shutt =

American football player (born 1987)

No. 9, 26
- Position: Defensive back

Personal information
- Born: October 8, 1987 (age 39); Pontiac, Michigan, U.S.
- Listed height: 6 ft 0 in (1.83 m)
- Listed weight: 190 lb (86 kg)

Career information
- High school: Jacksonville (FL) Potter's House Christian Academy
- College: Florida A&M
- NFL draft: 2012: undrafted

Career history
- Knoxville NightHawks (2012); Columbus Lions (2013); Orlando Predators (2013–2015); Tampa Bay Storm (2017)

Awards and highlights
- PIFL Defensive Player of the Year (2013); First Team All-PIFL (2013)

Career AFL statistics
- Total tackles: 157
- Forced fumbles: 1
- Fumble recoveries: 3
- Pass deflections: 16
- Interceptions: 4
- Stats at ArenaFan.com

Anthony Allen Shutt (born October 8, 1987) is an American former football defensive back. He played college football for Florida A&M University. He was signed as a free agent by the Columbus Lions in 2013.

== Professional career ==
=== Knoxville NightHawks ===
After going undrafted in the 2012 NFL draft, Shutt signed with the Knoxville NightHawks of the Professional Indoor Football League (PIFL).

=== Columbus Lions ===
In 2013, Shutt signed with the Columbus Lions, also of the PIFL. At the conclusion of the 2013 season, he was named First Team All-PIFL and the PIFL Defensive Player of the Year.

=== Orlando Predators ===
Shutt was assigned to the Orlando Predators of the Arena Football League late in the 2013 season. He was placed on reassignment on March 31, 2015. He was once again assigned to the Predators on April 7, 2015. On December 29, 2015, Shutt was placed on recallable reassignment.

=== Tampa Bay Storm ===
Shutt was assigned to the Tampa Bay Storm on May 2, 2017. On June 29, 2017, Shutt was placed on reassignment. On July 20, 2017, Shutt was placed on league suspension.
