= Charles McClain =

American football player (born 1989)

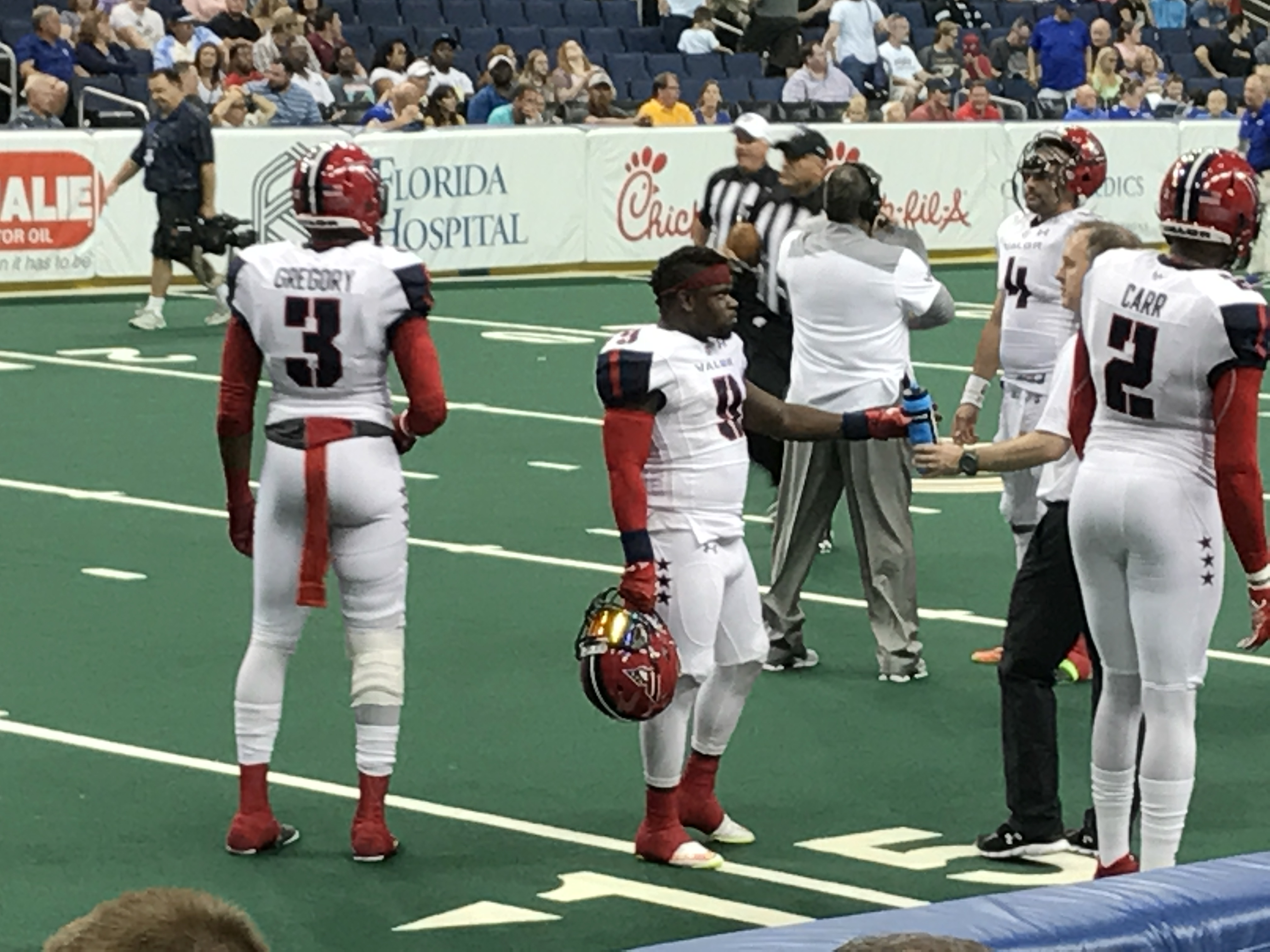
- McClain with the Washington Valor in 2017

No. 3, 9
- Position: Wide receiver

Personal information
- Born: May 22, 1989 (age 37); Oxford, Alabama, U.S.
- Listed height: 5 ft 7 in (1.70 m)
- Listed weight: 185 lb (84 kg)

Career information
- High school: Oxford (AL)
- College: North Alabama
- NFL draft: 2011: undrafted

Career history
- Alabama Hammers (2011–2015); New Orleans VooDoo (2015); Cleveland Gladiators (2016)*; Tampico Lagartos (2016); Monterrey Steel (2017); Washington Valor (2017); Lehigh Valley Steelhawks (2018)
- * Offseason or practice squad member only

Awards and highlights
- First-team All-PIFL (2012); 2× Second-team All-PIFL (2013, 2014)

Career AFL statistics
- Receptions: 86
- Receiving yards: 857
- Receiving TDs: 18
- Rushing yards: 27
- Rushing TDs: 2
- Stats at ArenaFan.com

Charles McClain (born May 22, 1989) is an American former professional football wide receiver. He played college football at the University of North Alabama.

== Early life ==
McClain attended Oxford High School, in Oxford, Alabama, where he was an All-County and All-State selection for the football team.

== College career ==
McClain signed to play college football at the University of North Alabama. He played in 50 games during his college career, catching 82 passes for 816 yards and five touchdowns.

== Professional career ==
=== Alabama Hammers ===
From 2011 to 2015, McClain was a member of the Alabama Hammers of both the Southern Indoor Football League and the Professional Indoor Football League. In 2012, McClain was named First Team All-PIFL as a kick returner. In 2013, McClain was named Second Team All-PIFL as a kick returner, and in 2014, McClain was named Second Team All-PIFL as an ironman.

=== New Orleans VooDoo ===
In April, 2015, McClain signed with the New Orleans VooDoo of the Arena Football League. Joining the VooDoo reunited McClain with his former Hammers' head coach, Dean Cokinos. McClain caught 35 passes as a rookie for the VooDoo. When the VooDoo ceased operations on August 9, 2015, McClain became a free agent.

=== Cleveland Gladiators ===
On October 16, 2015, McClain was assigned to the Cleveland Gladiators.

=== Tampico Lagartos ===
McClain played for the Tampico Lagartos in 2016.

=== Monterrey Steel ===
On February 13, 2017, McClain signed with the Monterrey Steel.

=== Washington Valor ===
On April 26, 2017, McClain was assigned to the Washington Valor.
