= Kirby High School (Tennessee) =

Location
- 4080 Kirby Parkway; Memphis, Tennessee; United States; 35.03769°N 89.84624°W

Information
- Type: Public
- Established: 1980
- Principal: Steevon R. Hunter
- Staff: 43.36 (FTE)
- Grades: Grade 9–12
- Enrollment: 697 (2023–2024)
- Student to teacher ratio: 16.07
- Campus: Suburban
- Colors: Navy and gray
- Mascot: Cougar
- Newspaper: Cougar Chronicle
- Yearbook: Odyssey
- Affiliation: Shelby County Schools
- Website: https://schools.scsk12.org/kirby-hs

Kirby High School (KHS) is a public high school in the Hickory Hill community of Memphis, Tennessee, United States, and is a part of the Shelby County Schools district. KHS was established in 1980 as part of the Shelby County School System, serving students from grades 7 to 10, subtracting and adding grades until the first graduating class left KHS at the end of the 1982–83 school year. It later became a Memphis City School campus, after Memphis annexed Hickory Hill in 1999.

== Academics ==
Kirby offers two basic academic programs: the Standard Program and the Honors Program. To take courses in the latter program, students must achieve certain scores on standardized tests, maintain certain grades, and meet certain course requirements.

There are four communities or academies at the "New" Kirby High School: 9th Grade, SEA (Science Engineering and Agriculture), BHS (Business and Human Services), and AIM (Arts Information and Multimedia). All students start off in the 9th Grade Academy, but join the other academies based on their own personal interest and remain in them until they graduate.

== Athletics ==
Kirby High School offers a variety of sports: baseball, basketball, bowling, football, cheerleading, softball, track and field, soccer, volleyball, wrestling, and dance.

- The 1984 Kirby boys basketball team won the TSSAA state championship and the 1986 team finished second.
- The 1984 Kirby football team won the City/County Football Championship. The Cougars finishing undefeated in the regular season (10–0) and won the District 15AA and Regional 8AA title en route to the state quarterfinals. The program also reached the state quarterfinals in 1998 and 2018.
- The 1988 Kirby baseball team won the District 14AAA title.
- Scott Nailen (1990), Michael Spencer (1993) and Markese Nelson (1994, 1995) have won state wrestling titles.
- The 1992-93 Kirby wrestling team finished 3rd at the Large Class State Dual Tournament.
- Tara Rhodes (1989), Kymia Love (1997, 1998), Andrea Fitzgerald (2000) and Jalesha Jarmon (2007) have won individual state titles in girls track and field. The team also won the 800-meter relay state championship in 2005.

== Notable alumni ==
- Larry Shipp, former American Football Player who achieved two-time All-American honors while playing wide receiver at Tennessee Tech University. Shipp was inducted into the Tennessee Tech hall of fame in 2018.
- Reggie Howard, football player. Carolina Panthers, New Orleans Saints and Miami Dolphins. Recovered from a broken neck suffered while at the University of Memphis to play seven seasons in the NFL.
