= 2013 Columbus Lions season =

- Owner: John Hargrove; Keith Norred; Kike Seda; Skip Seda; Rich Jacobson
- Head coach: Jason Gibson
- Home stadium: Columbus Civic Center

Results
- Record: 4–8
- League place: 6th
- Playoffs: Did not qualify

The 2013 Columbus Lions season was the seventh season for the professional indoor football franchise and their second in the Professional Indoor Football League (PIFL). The Lions were one of seven teams that competed in the PIFL for the 2013 season.

The team played their home games under head coach Jason Gibson at the Columbus Civic Center in Columbus, Georgia. The Lions earned a 4–8 record, placing sixth in the league, failing to qualify for the playoffs.

== Schedule ==
Key: Win Tie Loss Bye

=== Regular season ===
All start times are local to home team

Week	Day	Date	Kickoff	Opponent	Results		Location
Week	Day	Date	Kickoff	Opponent	Score	Record	Location
1	Sunday	March 10	4:00pm	Knoxville NightHawks	W 58–28	1–0	Columbus Civic Center
2	Saturday	March 16	7:06pm	Albany Panthers	L 37–40	1–1	James H. Gray Civic Center
3	BYE						
4	BYE						
5	Saturday	April 6	7:00pm	at Alabama Hammers	L 45–72	1–2	Von Braun Center
6	Saturday	April 13	7:00pm	at Louisiana Swashbucklers	W 45–42	2–2	Sudduth Coliseum
7	Saturday	April 20	7:05pm	Richmond Raiders	W 48–42	3–2	Columbus Civic Center
8	Saturday	April 27	7:00pm	Louisiana Swashbucklers	L 65–77	3–3	James H. Gray Civic Center
9	Sunday	May 5	4:05pm	at Lehigh Valley Steelhawks	L 51–60	3–4	Stabler Arena
10	BYE						
11	Saturday	May 18	7:00pm	Alabama Hammers	L 43–70	3–5	Columbus Civic Center
12	Saturday	May 25	7:30pm	at Richmond Raiders	L 42–48 OT	3–6	Richmond Coliseum
13	Sunday	June 2	4:00pm	Lehigh Valley Steelhawks	W 59–48	4–6	Columbus Civic Center
14	Saturday	June 8	7:00pm	Albany Panthers	L 15–35	4–7	Columbus Civic Center
15	BYE						
16	Saturday	June 22	7:00pm	at Albany Panthers	L 35–59	4–8	James H. Gray Civic Center

== Roster ==
2013 Columbus Lions roster
Quarterbacks: 9 Lee Chapple; Running backs: 44 Gerald Harris; Wide receivers: 8 Maurice Dupree; 6 Jarmon Fortson; 1 Gerald Gales; 2 Marcus Jones	Offensive linemen: 72 Adam Durham; 58 Dion Small; 75 Brandon Thomas; Defensive linemen: 11 Brandon Davis; 42 Joshua Gipson; 98 Lawon Scott	Linebackers: 5 Ryan Babb; 34 Jamontay Pilson; 51 Justen Rivers; Defensive backs: 21 Jeremy Gray; 3 Daniel Lee; 7 LeRoy Vann; Kickers: 15 Craig Camay	Injured reserve: Currently vacant; Exempt list: 4 Anthony Shutt DB (Exempt); Rookies in italics Roster updated July 1, 2013; 19 Active, 1 Inactive → More rosters

== Division standings ==
2013 Professional Indoor Football League
Team	W	L	T	PCT	PF	PA	PF (Avg.)	PA (Avg.)	STK
y-Alabama Hammers	9	2	0	.818	631	454	57.4	41.3	W4
x-Lehigh Valley Steelhawks	7	5	0	.583	667	598	55.6	49.8	W1
x-Richmond Raiders	7	5	0	.583	603	605	50.3	50.4	W1
x-Albany Panthers	7	5	0	.583	574	518	47.8	43.2	W1
Louisiana Swashbucklers	5	6	0	.455	497	524	45.2	47.6	L1
Columbus Lions	4	8	0	.333	543	621	45.3	51.8	L2
Knoxville NightHawks	2	10	0	.167	421	616	35.1	51.3	L5
