= Davon Morgan =

American football player and coach (born 1989)

Bluefield State Big Blues
- Title: Head coach

Personal information
- Born: January 28, 1989 (age 37); Richmond, Virginia, U.S.
- Listed height: 6 ft 0 in (1.83 m)
- Listed weight: 189 lb (86 kg)

Career information
- High school: Richmond (VA) Varina
- College: Virginia Tech
- NFL draft: 2011: undrafted

Career history

Playing
- New York Jets (2011)*; Richmond Raiders (2013); Philadelphia Eagles (2014)*; New Orleans VooDoo (2015)*; Richmond Roughriders (2017)
- * Offseason or practice squad member only

Coaching
- Henrico HS (VA) (2012–2014) Offensive coordinator & quarterbacks coach; Virginia State (2015) Defensive backs coach; Virginia–Lynchburg (2016–2017) Co-defensive coordinator, special teams coordinator, & defensive backs coach; Alderson Broaddus (2019) Defensive backs coach; Emory & Henry (2020) Wide receivers coach; Elizabeth City State (2021) Defensive coordinator & defensive backs coach; Florida A&M (2022–2023) Defensive pass game coordinator & defensive backs coach; Bluefield State (2024–present) Head coach

Awards and highlights
- Second-team All-ACC (2010)

Head coaching record
- Career: 4–16 (.200)
- Stats at Pro Football Reference

Davon Morgan (born January 28, 1989) is an American college football coach and former safety. He is the head football coach for Bluefield State University, a position he has held since 2024. He played college football at Virginia Tech.

== Professional career ==
Morgan had only started one full year (23 overall starts) for the Hokies. However, in that one year he put together 5 interceptions, 82 total tackles (53 solo tackles), 4 pass breakups, 9 passes defended, 1 fumble recovery, 1 forced fumble, 5 tackle for loss, and 1 blocked punt.

=== New York Jets ===
In May 2011, Morgan signed with the New York Jets as an undrafted free agent. He was later waived September 2, 2011.

=== Richmond Raiders ===
On December 23, 2012, Morgan signed with the Richmond Raiders.

=== Philadelphia Eagles ===
On May 19, 2014, Morgan signed with the Philadelphia Eagles as free agent. He was released on August 23, 2014.

=== New Orleans VooDoo ===
On October 28, 2014, Morgan was assigned to the New Orleans VooDoo. Morgan was placed on reassignment on February 23, 2015.

=== Richmond Roughriders ===
On December 22, 2017, it was announced that Morgan had signed with the Richmond Roughriders. He started off the season strong with six solo tackles and one tackle for a loss in a win versus the High County Grizzlies.

== Coaching career ==
On March 5, 2024, Morgan was named the head football coach for Bluefield State University.

== Head coaching record ==
Year	Team	Overall	Conference	Standing	Bowl/playoffs
Bluefield State Big Blues (Central Intercollegiate Athletic Association) (2024–present)
2024	Bluefield State	1–9	0–7	11th	
2025	Bluefield State	3–7	2–5	T–7th	
Bluefield State:		4–16	2–12		
Total:		4–16			
