= Larry Shipp =

American football player (born 1986)

No. 1
- Position: Wide receiver

Personal information
- Born: May 23, 1986 (age 40); Memphis, Tennessee, U.S.
- Listed height: 5 ft 10 in (1.78 m)
- Listed weight: 200 lb (91 kg)

Career information
- High school: Memphis (TN) Kirby
- College: Tennessee Tech
- NFL draft: 2008: undrafted

Career history
- Detroit Lions (2008)*; Alabama Vipers (2009–2010); Georgia Force (2011–2012); Spokane Shock (2013)*; Alabama Hammers (2013–2014)
- * Offseason or practice squad member only

Awards and highlights
- PIFL Cup champion (2013)

Career AFL statistics
- Receptions: 343
- Yards: 4,583
- Receiving TDs: 86
- Passing TDs: 3
- Rushing TDs: 10
- Stats at ArenaFan.com

Larry Shipp Jr. (born May 23, 1986) is an American former professional football wide receiver.

== Professional career ==
=== Alabama Vipers ===
In 2009, Shipp signed to play with the Alabama Vipers of af2. After the season, the Viper announced that they would be a part of the new Arena Football League, and Shipp re-signed with the team for 2010.

=== Georgia Force ===
In 2011, the Vipers went through change again, as they replaced the former Georgia Force, taking over their identity and records. Shipp was re-signed by the team again, and had a highly successful season. He has re-signed with the Force for the 2012 season.
