= Michael Simons =

American football player (born 1989)

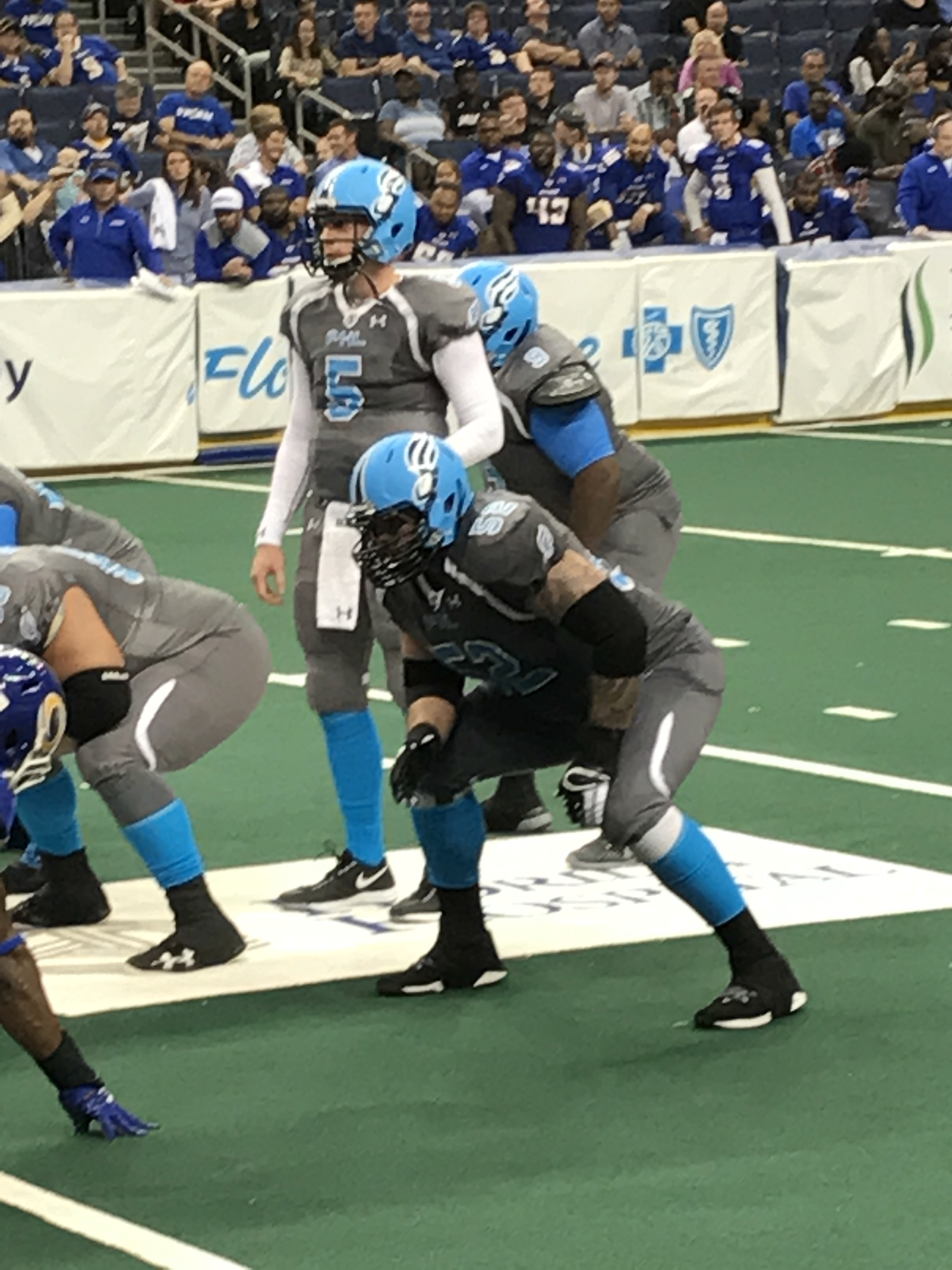
- Simons (#52) in 2017

No. 52
- Position: Offensive lineman

Personal information
- Born: September 8, 1989 (age 37); Hollywood, Florida, U.S.
- Listed height: 6 ft 4 in (1.93 m)
- Listed weight: 295 lb (134 kg)

Career information
- High school: Wilbraham (MA) Wilbraham & Monson Academy
- College: Central Connecticut
- NFL draft: 2011: undrafted

Career history
- Lehigh Valley Steelhawks (2013); Orlando Predators (2014–2015); Arizona Rattlers (2016); Philadelphia Soul (2017)

Awards and highlights
- ArenaBowl champion (2017)

Career AFL statistics
- Carries: 81
- Rushing yards: 229
- Rushing TDs: 19
- Receptions: 23
- Receiving yards: 251
- Stats at ArenaFan.com

Michael Simons (born September 8, 1989) is an American former professional football offensive lineman. He played college football at Central Connecticut State University. He was a member of the Lehigh Valley Steelhawks, Orlando Predators, Arizona Rattlers, and Philadelphia Soul.

== Early life ==
Simons attended South Broward High School in Hollywood, Florida and Wilbraham & Monson Academy in Wilbraham, Massachusetts.

== College career ==
Simon played for the Central Connecticut from 2008 to 2009. He played in 3 games during his career, including 1 start at guard. Following his sophomore year, Simons quit football.

== Professional career ==
=== Lehigh Valley Steelhawks ===
After a four-year break from football, Simons played for the Lehigh Valley Steelhawks of the Professional Indoor Football League in 2013.

=== Orlando Predators ===
On August 1, 2013, Simons was assigned to the Orlando Predators of the Arena Football League He was assigned as an offensive lineman for the Predators, but his 4.9 second 40-yard dash time at the Predators tryout made him an option for use at fullback. Simons ran for 64 yards on 25 carries for 6 touchdowns as a rookie. On September 24, 2014, Simons had his rookie option exercised by the Predators. In his second season with the Predators, Simons ran for 165 yards and scored 13 touchdowns.

=== Arizona Rattlers ===
On December 9, 2015, Simons was assigned to the Arizona Rattlers. Simons was relieved of his fullback duties in Arizona, but he did catch 5 passes for 60 yards with 2 touchdowns.

=== Philadelphia Soul ===
Simons was assigned to the Philadelphia Soul for the 2017 season. On August 26, 2017, the Soul beat the Tampa Bay Storm in ArenaBowl XXX by a score of 44–40.
