= Dean Cokinos =

American football coach (born 1968)

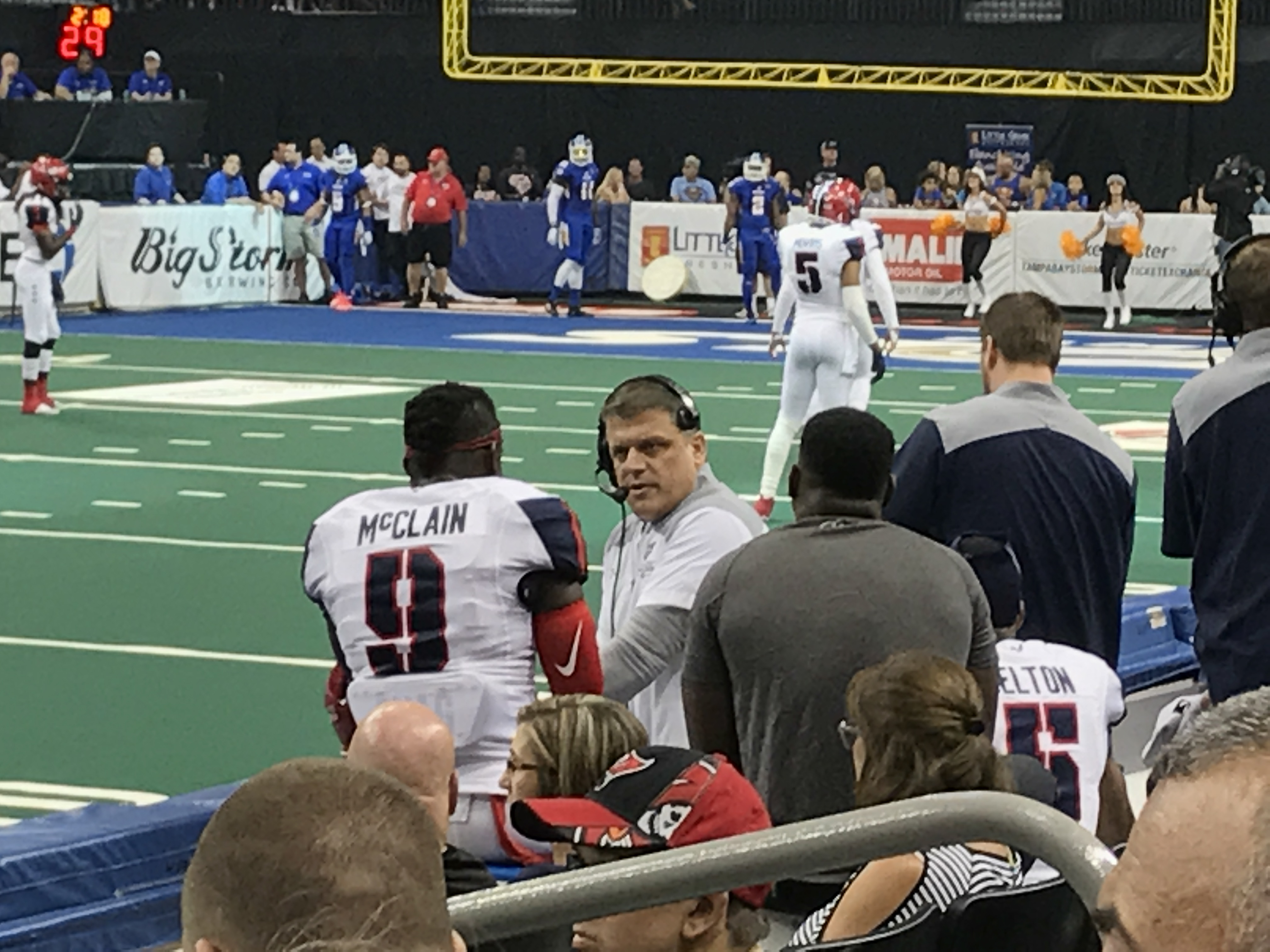
- Cokinos with the Washington Valor in 2017

Personal information
- Born: Boston, Massachusetts, U.S. c. 1968 (age 57–58)

Career information
- Position: Running back
- High school: Archbishop Williams (Braintree, Massachusetts)
- College: UMass Boston
- NFL draft: 1990: undrafted

Career history

Coaching
- UMass Boston (1990) Assistant coach; Austin Peay (1991) Assistant coach; West Alabama (1992) Assistant coach; Noris Rams (1994–1997) Head coach; Munich Cowboys (1999–2001) Head coach; Wilkes-Barre/Scranton Pioneers (2003) Head coach; San Angelo Stampede (2004) Head coach; Nashville Kats (2005) Assistant coach; Nashville Kats (2006–2007) Offensive coordinator; Tennessee Valley / Alabama Vipers (2008–2010) Head coach; Georgia Force (2011–2012) Head coach; Alabama Hammers (2013–2014) Head coach; New Orleans VooDoo (2015) Head coach; Tampa Bay Storm (2016) Assistant head coach & defensive coordinator; Washington Valor (2017–2018) Head coach; Berlin Rebels (2019) Defensive coordinator; Brentwood Academy (TN) (2020) Special teams coordinator; Ensworth (TN) (2021–2022) Linebackers coach; Knoxville Catholic HS (TN) (2023)* Head coach; Nashville Kats (2024) Head coach; Berlin Thunder (2025) Head coach

Operations
- Tennessee Titans (2003–2007) Pro scout

Awards and highlights
- ArenaCup champion (2008); PIFL champion (2013); PIFL Coach of the Year (2013); GFL South Conference Champions (1996–1997, 2000–2001)

Dean Cokinos (born c. 1968) is an American football coach. He has held assistant coaching or head coaching positions with UMass Boston, Austin Peay, West Alabama, Noris Rams, Munich Cowboys, Wilkes-Barre/Scranton Pioneers, San Angelo Stampede, Nashville Kats, Tennessee Valley Vipers, Alabama Vipers, Georgia Force, Alabama Hammers, New Orleans VooDoo, Tampa Bay Storm, Washington Valor, Berlin Rebels, Nashville Kats (2024), and Berlin Thunder.

== College career ==
Cokinos attended University of Massachusetts Boston, where he was a running back for the Beacons. He was a college teammate of Pat Sperduto, whom he later served under in Nashville.

== Coaching career ==
Cokinos spent seven years as a head coach for two teams in the German Football League. Cokinos was an assistant coach for the Nashville Kats from 2005 to 2007. While with the Kats, he was also tasked with evaluating professional arena/indoor football players for the Tennessee Titans, who then owned the Kats. Cokinos was later head coach of the Alabama Vipers, Georgia Force and New Orleans VooDoo, helping the Force reach the playoffs in 2011 and 2012. He coached the Tennessee Valley Vipers to a 56 to 55 overtime victory against the Spokane Shock in ArenaCup IX. Cokinos served as head coach of the Alabama Hammers of the Professional Indoor Football League from 2013 to 2014, winning the PIFL Championship in 2013 and being named Coach of the Year. He was named assistant head coach and defensive coordinator of the Tampa Bay Storm on October 26, 2015. On May 5, 2016, Cokinos was named the inaugural head coach for the Washington Arena Football League Team, which was later named the Washington Valor. He held this position until May 16, 2018, when he was relieved of his position as coach of the then-winless Valor.

In 2019, he served as defensive coordinator of the Berlin Rebels in Germany.

In December 2022, Cokinos was hired as the head football coach for Knoxville Catholic High School but he resigned in July 2023 before coaching a game.

Cokinos was the head coach of the Nashville Kats of the new Arena Football League in 2024.

On December 5, 2024, he was announced as the head coach of the Berlin Thunder of the European League of Football. However, he later resigned in January 2025 for personal reasons.

=== Head coaching record ===
==== AFL ====
Team	Year	Regular season				Postseason			
Team	Year	Won	Lost	Win %	Finish	Won	Lost	Win %	Result
ALA	2010	7	9	.438	4th in AC South	0	0	.000	
GEO	2011	11	7	.611	2nd in AC South	1	1	.500	Lost to Jacksonville Sharks in AC Championship
GEO	2012	9	9	.500	2nd in AC South	0	1	.000	Lost to Jacksonville Sharks in Conference Semifinals
GEO total		20	16	.556		1	2	.333	
NO	2015	3	14	.176	3rd in AC East	0	0	.000	
WAS	2017	3	11	.214	5th in AFL	0	0	.000	
WAS	2018	0	4	.000	(Fired)	0	0	.000	
WAS total		3	15	.167		0	0	.000	
Total		33	54	.379		1	2	.333	

==== af2, IFL, PIFL, and AFL (2024) ====
Team	Year	Regular season				Postseason			
Team	Year	Won	Lost	Win %	Finish	Won	Lost	Win %	Result
WBS	2003	6	10	.375	3rd in af2 AC NE	0	0	.000	
SA	2004	9	7	.563	4th in IFL	0	1	.000	Lost to Amarillo Dusters in Semifinals
TV	2008	10	6	.625	3rd in af2 AC South	4	0	1.000	Won ArenaCup IX
TV	2009	11	5	.688	1st in af2 AC South	0	1	1.000	Lost to Green Bay Blizzard in AC Round 1
TV total		21	11	.656		4	1	.800	
ALA	2013	9	2	.818	1st in PIFL	2	0	1.000	Won PIFL Championship
ALA	2014	4	8	.333	4th in PIFL AC	0	0	.000	
ALA total		13	10	.556		2	0	1.000	
NAS	2024	3	4	.429	6th in AFL	1	1	.500	
Total		52	42	.563		7	3	.700	
