= Tom Gilson (American football) =

American football player (born 1988)

No. 1, 5, 7, 11, 6, 9
- Position: Wide receiver

Personal information
- Born: November 6, 1988 (age 38)
- Listed height: 6 ft 2 in (1.88 m)
- Listed weight: 205 lb (93 kg)

Career information
- High school: Mansfield (MA)
- College: Massachusetts
- NFL draft: 2012: undrafted

Career history
- Lehigh Valley Steelhawks (2013); Cleveland Gladiators (2013–2014); Los Angeles Kiss (2015); Portland Steel (2016); Washington Valor (2017)*; Cleveland Gladiators (2017); Jacksonville Sharks (2018)
- * Offseason or practice squad member only

Awards and highlights
- Second-team All-PIFL (2013); PIFL Offensive Rookie of the Year (2013)

Career AFL statistics
- Receptions: 206
- Receiving yards: 2,094
- Receiving TDs: 23
- Tackles: 29.5
- Fumble recoveries: 2
- Stats at ArenaFan.com

Thomas Gilson, Jr (born November 6, 1988) is an American former professional football wide receiver. He played college football at the University of Massachusetts Amherst and was a member of the Lehigh Valley Steelhawks, Cleveland Gladiators, Los Angeles Kiss, Portland Steel, Washington Valor, and Jacksonville Sharks.

== Early life ==
Gilson played high school football at Mansfield High School in Mansfield, Massachusetts. A two-year lettered at both quarterback and wide receiver, he led the team to state championships in 2003 and 2004 with a 25–0 record as quarterback. Gilson helped the team win league titles in 2005 and 2006 with a 19–2 overall record. He received Sun Chronicle All-Star honors his junior and senior seasons, Hockomock League All-Star recognition his senior year, and was named a Brockton Enterprise All-Star as a junior. Gilson played in the Shriner's All-Star Game. In his two years as a wide receiver, he accumulated 54 receptions for 1,154 yards and a school-record 15 touchdowns. He was also a team captain for the basketball team his senior year and a state qualifier in the triple jump and 4 × 100 metres relay in track and field.

== College career ==
Gilson played for the UMass Minutemen team from 2008 to 2011, having been redshirted in 2007. He won the team's Outstanding Offensive Scout Team Player award in 2008. As a senior in 2011, Gilson caught 39 passes for 446 yards. He graduated from UMass with a bachelor's degree in kinesiology.

== Professional career ==
In 2013, Gilson played for the Lehigh Valley Steelhawks of the Professional Indoor Football League (PIFL). After recording 93 receptions for 946 yards and 19 touchdowns during the regular season, he was named the PIFL Offensive Rookie of the Year and earned Second Team All-PIFL honors. In the first round of the playoffs, he caught six passes for 91 yards and three touchdowns against the Richmond Raiders.

Gilson was assigned to the AFL's Cleveland Gladiators on July 25, 2013. During the 2014 regular season, he recorded three receptions for 42 yards and a touchdown in five games. In the Gladiators' 56–46 win over the Orlando Predators in the American Conference Championship game on August 10, 2014, he caught three passes for 25 yards and a touchdown. Gilson then played in ArenaBowl XXVII, where the Gladiators suffered a 72–32 loss to the Arizona Rattlers.

On October 28, 2014, Gilson was assigned to the Los Angeles Kiss of the AFL. In 2015, he recorded 53 receptions for 549 yards and seven touchdowns in seventeen games.

Gilson was assigned to the Portland Thunder of the AFL on February 9, 2016. On February 24, 2016, the franchise changed its name from Thunder to Steel. In 2016, he caught 132 passes for 1,303 yards and 14 touchdowns.

Gilson was assigned to the Washington Valor on February 20, 2017. On March 31, 2017, he was placed on recallable reassignment.

On May 26, 2017, Gilson was assigned to the Cleveland Gladiators, but he refused to report the following day. On June 1, he was activated. Gilson played in 5 games (starting 4) in 2017, catching 18 passes for 200 yards and 1 touchdown.

In 2018, Gilson played in 13 games for the Jacksonville Sharks of the National Arena League, recording 67 receptions for 875 yards and 18 touchdowns.

== Coaching career ==
Gilson has worked as a wide receivers coach at both Santa Ana College and Mount Ida College, an assistant coach at Xaverian Brothers High School, a strength and conditioning intern at the University of South Carolina, a strength and conditioning graduate assistant at the University of the Incarnate Word, an assistant strength and conditioning coach at Utah State University, and an assistant athletic performance coach at the University of California, Los Angeles.
