= Knoxville NightHawks =

Logo

General information
- Founded: 2011
- Folded: 2013
- Headquartered: Knoxville, Tennessee at the James White Civic Coliseum
- Colors: Royal Blue, Green, Silver, White
- Mascot: Ace

Personnel
- Owners: Southern Sports and Entertainment LLC (Jeff Knight, CEO)
- CEO: Jeff Knight
- Head coach: Cosmo DeMatteo
- President: Joe Stroud

Nickname
- NightHawks

Team history
- Knoxville NightHawks (2011–2013)

Home fields
- James White Civic Coliseum (2012-2013)

League / conference affiliations
- Professional Indoor Football League (2012–2013)

The Knoxville NightHawks were a professional indoor football team based in Knoxville, Tennessee. The team was a member of the Professional Indoor Football League (PIFL). The NightHawks joined the PIFL in 2012 as an expansion team. The NightHawks were the second indoor/arena football team based in Knoxville, following the Tennessee ThunderCats which played in the Indoor Professional Football League for the 2001 season before joining the National Indoor Football League where they played the 2002 and 2003 seasons (the latter of which they played as the Tennessee Riverhawks) before moving to Greenville, South Carolina. The Owner of the NightHawks was Southern Sports Entertainment, LLC. The NightHawks played their home games at the James White Civic Coliseum in Knoxville, Tennessee.

== Franchise history ==
=== 2012 ===
The franchise was announced by Owner Jeff Knight on September 15, 2011. He announced the team's decision to join the Professional Indoor Football League and that the team would play at the James White Civic Coliseum. On October 4, 2011, the NightHawks named Chris MacKeown the team's first coach in franchise history. The team made a splash when they signed veteran NFL defensive lineman Chris Bradwell, and veteran Arena Football League quarterback, Tony Colston. In the team's first ever game, the NightHawks fell 45–70 to the Alabama Hammers. The team started 0–6 on the season before winning their 7th contest on May 5, 2012, an overtime victory over the Hammers. The team finished their inaugural season 1–11 with a 0.083 winning percentage, which was worst in the PIFL. Coach MacKeown said he felt that he would not be back for a second season with the team.

=== 2013 ===
In October 2012, the NightHawks named Cosmo DeMatteo the second head coach in franchise history. The NightHawks finished the 2013 season 2–10 with a 0.167 winning percentage, finishing in the bottom of the league.

== Notable players ==
See Category:Knoxville NightHawks players

=== Awards and honors ===
The following is a list of all NightHawks players who won league awards:

Season	Player	Position	Award
2012	Ginikachi Ibe	DB	Defensive Rookie of the Year
2013	Armando Cuko	K	Special Teams Player of the Year

== Head coaches ==
Name	Term	Regular season				Playoffs		Awards
Name	Term	W	L	T	Win%	W	L	Awards
Chris MacKeown	2012	1	11	0	.083	0	0	
Cosmo DeMatteo	2013	2	10	0	.167	0	0	

== Season-by-season results ==
League champions	Conference champions	Division champions	Wild card berth	League leader

Season	Team	League	Conference	Division	Regular season				Postseason results
Season	Team	League	Conference	Division	Finish	Wins	Losses	Ties	Postseason results
2012	2012	PIFL			6th	1	11	0	
2013	2013	PIFL			6th	2	10	0	
Totals						3	21	0	All-time regular season record (2012–2013)
Totals						0	0	-	All-time postseason record (2012–2013)
Totals						3	21	0	All-time regular season and postseason record (2012)
