= Knoxville Civic Coliseum =

Arena in Tennessee, United States

Coordinates: 35°57′54″N 83°54′41″W

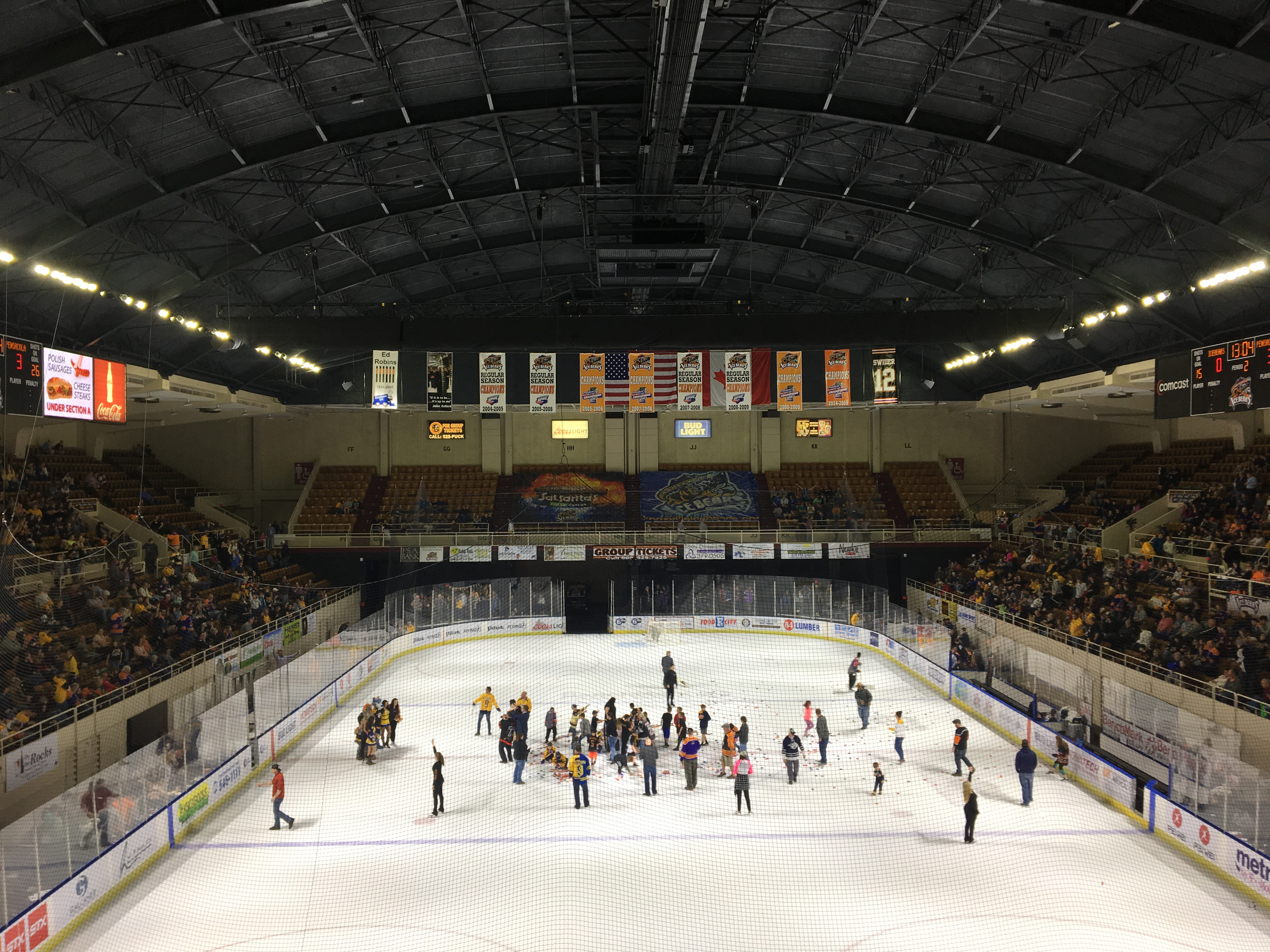

- Location within Tennessee Location within the United States
- Full name: General James White Memorial Civic Auditorium and Coliseum
- Address: 500 Howard Baker Jr. Avenue
- Location: Knoxville, Tennessee, U.S.
- Owner: City of Knoxville
- Operator: SMG
- Capacity: 6,500 (coliseum); 2,500 (auditorium)

Construction
- Opened: 1961
- Architects: Painter, Weeks, and McCarty

Tenants
- Knoxville Knights (EHL) (1961–1968); Knoxville Cherokees (ECHL) (1988–1997); Tennessee Volunteers ice hockey (CHS) (1992–present; half of home games); Knoxville Speed (UHL) (1999–2002); Knoxville Ice Bears (SPHL) (2002–present); Knoxville NightHawks (PIFL) (2012–2013)

Website
- knoxvillecoliseum.com

General James White Memorial Civic Auditorium and Coliseum (usually shortened to Knoxville Civic Coliseum) is a multi-purpose events facility in Knoxville, Tennessee, owned by the Knoxville city government and managed by ASM. Its components are an auditorium with a maximum seating capacity of 2,500, a multi-purpose arena with a maximum seating capacity of 6,500, an exhibition hall and a reception hall. It was built in 1961.

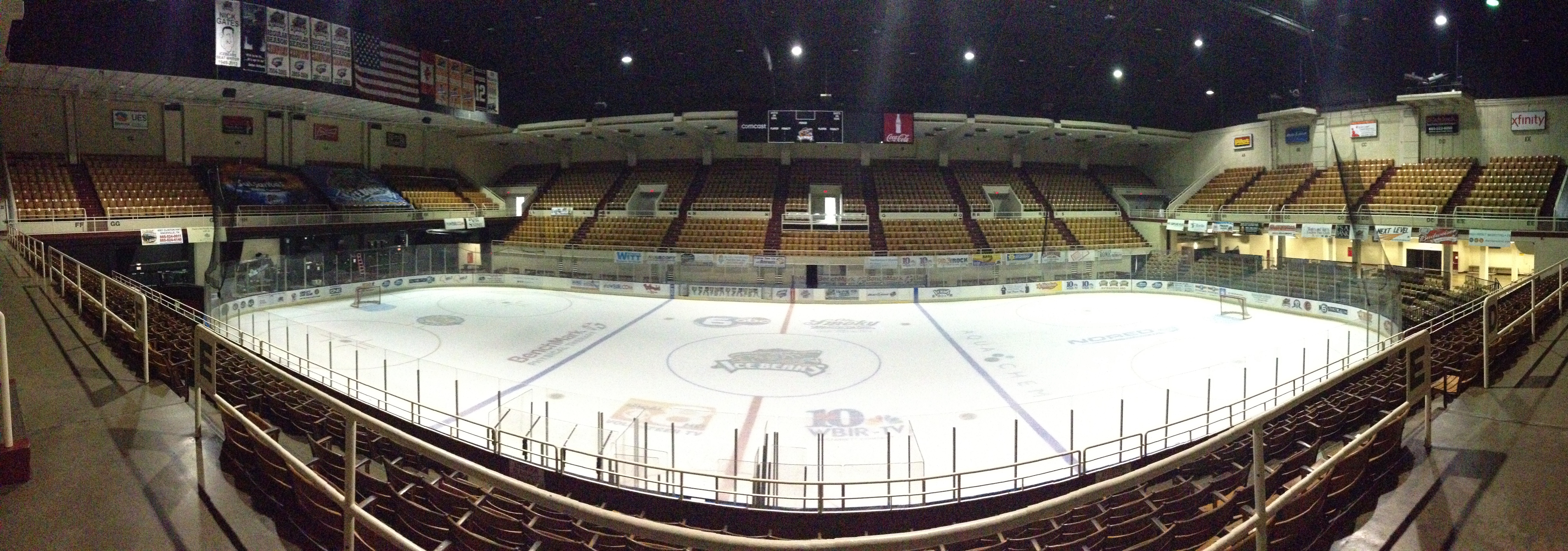
Panorama of Coliseum in 2007

The arena is home to the Knoxville Ice Bears, of the SPHL and the University of Tennessee Ice Vols, of the ACHA. In the past, the arena hosted the Knoxville Speed, of the UHL, the Knoxville Cherokees, of the ECHL and the Knoxville Knights, of the EHL.

It was the main home arena for Smoky Mountain Wrestling, a regional wrestling promotion, run by pro wrestling Hall of Famer Jim Cornette from 1992 to 1995.

Performances hosted in the facility have included circuses, plays and musicals, symphony orchestra concerts, popular music concerts, and comedians. On March 18, 1982, the venue was notable to be the site of Randy Rhoads' final show, before his death in a plane crash the very next day.

The Coliseum hosted the final concert of George Jones on April 6, 2013. Jones checked into Vanderbilt Hospital in Nashville on April 18, dying there on the morning of April 26.

Chicago broke the record (at that time) for the fastest sellout to a concert at the Coliseum for their August 26, 1971, performance.

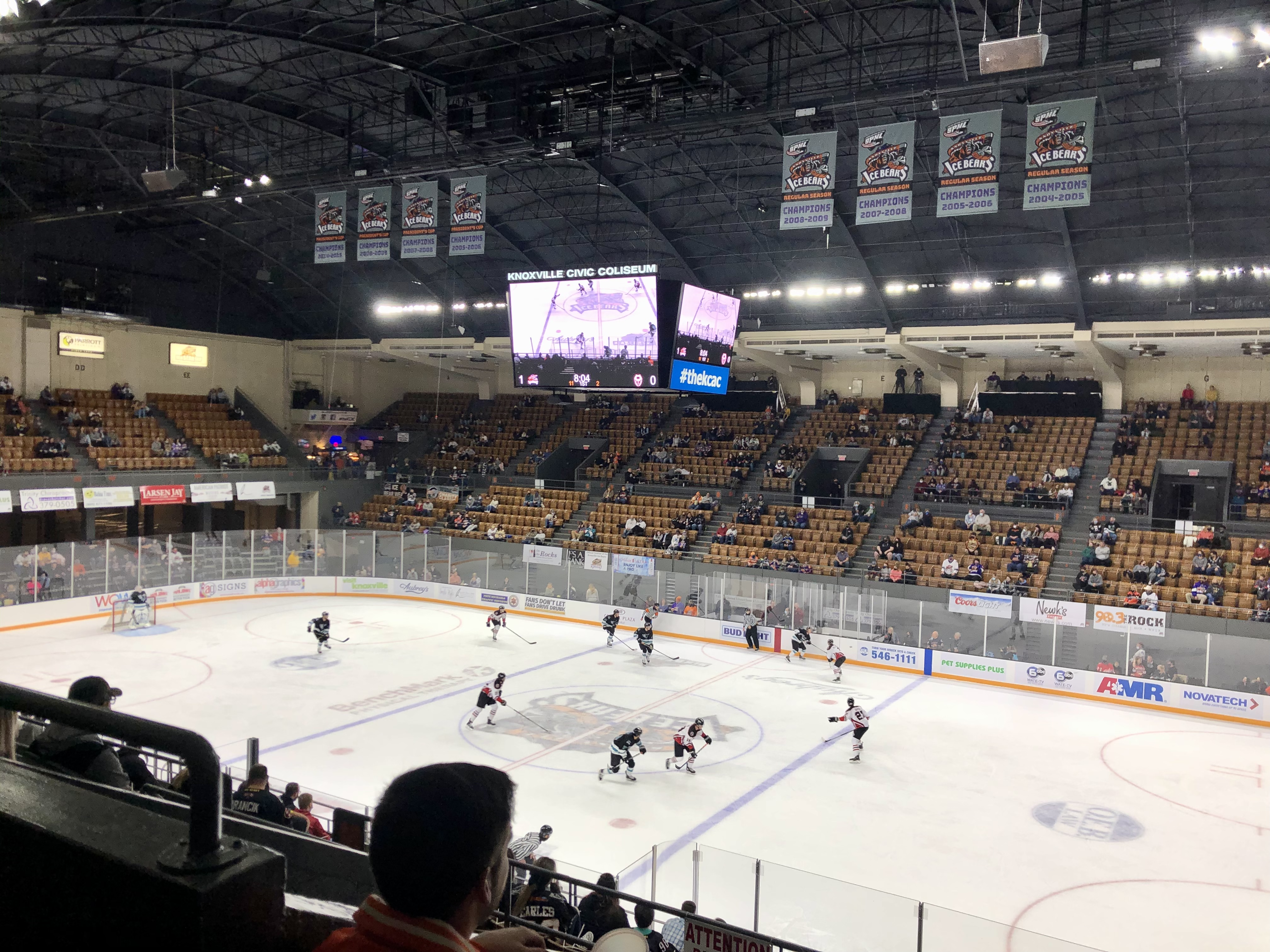
The interior of the Coliseum during an Ice Bears game in February 2021.
