= 2013 PIFL season =

2013 Professional Indoor Football League season
- League: Professional Indoor Football League
- Sport: Indoor American football
- Duration: March 8, 2013 – July 8, 2013

Regular season
- Season MVP: Mico McSwain (ALA)

League Postseason
- 1 vs. 4 champions: Alabama Hammers
- 1 vs. 4 runners-up: Albany Panthers
- 2 vs. 3 champions: Richmond Raiders
- 2 vs. 3 runners-up: Lehigh Valley Steelhawks

PIFL Cup II
- Champions: Alabama Hammers
- Runners-up: Richmond Raiders
- Finals MVP: Russell Hill (ALA)

PIFL seasons
- ← 2012 2014 →

The 2013 Professional Indoor Football League season was the second season of the Professional Indoor Football League (PIFL). The regular season began March 8, 2013, and ended on June 22, 2013. Each team played a 12-game schedule. The top 4 teams in the regular season standings commenced the playoffs on July 1. The final was played July 8, with the Alabama Hammers defeating the Richmond Raiders to win their first league championship.

== Pre-season ==
The Lehigh Valley Steelhawks joined the league, after playing two seasons in the Indoor Football League.

== Regular season ==
2013 Professional Indoor Football League
Team	W	L	T	PCT	PF	PA	PF (Avg.)	PA (Avg.)	STK
y-Alabama Hammers	9	2	0	.818	631	454	57.4	41.3	W4
x-Lehigh Valley Steelhawks	7	5	0	.583	667	598	55.6	49.8	W1
x-Richmond Raiders	7	5	0	.583	603	605	50.3	50.4	W1
x-Albany Panthers	7	5	0	.583	574	518	47.8	43.2	W1
Louisiana Swashbucklers	5	6	0	.455	497	524	45.2	47.6	L1
Columbus Lions	4	8	0	.333	543	621	45.3	51.8	L2
Knoxville NightHawks	2	10	0	.167	421	616	35.1	51.3	L5

y - clinched home playoff game

x - clinched playoff spot

The Alabama vs. Louisiana game scheduled for May 25 was cancelled after the Swashbucklers declared bankruptcy. The Swashbucklers played their final three road games as scheduled, however the Alabama game was not made up, as it did not have an effect on playoff seeding.

== Playoffs ==
Semifinals
1	Alabama	61
4	Albany	46
2	Lehigh Valley	40
3	Richmond	44

Finals
1	Alabama	70
3	Richmond	44

== Awards ==
- Most Valuable Player - Mico McSwain, Alabama Hammers
- Offensive Player of the Year - Mico McSwain, Alabama Hammers
- Defensive Player of the Year - Anthony Shutt, Columbus Lions
- Offensive Rookie of the Year - Thomas Gilson, Lehigh Valley Steelhawks
- Defensive Rookie of the Year - Jake Trantin, Alabama Hammers
- Special Teams Player of the Year - Armando Cuko, Knoxville NightHawks
- Coach of the Year - Dean Cokinos, Alabama Hammers
