= 2017 Jacksonville Sharks season =

- Owner: Jeff Bouchy; Steve Curran; Diva Nagula, D.O. Kevin Wezniak; Rob Storm; Jason Green; Larry Payne
- Head coach: Mark Stoute (fired week 10; 8–0 record); Siaha Burley (3–1 record)
- Home stadium: Jacksonville Veterans Memorial Arena

Results
- Record: 11–1
- Conference place: 1st
- Playoffs: Won NAL Semifinals 43–32 (Steel); Won NAL Championship 27–21 (Columbus)

The 2017 Jacksonville Sharks season was the eighth season for the professional indoor football franchise and first in the National Arena League (NAL). The Sharks were one of eight teams that competed in the NAL for its inaugural 2017 season

The Sharks played their home games at the Jacksonville Veterans Memorial Arena. Led by head coach Mark Stoute, the Sharks went undefeated through eight games and then Stoute was fired. Siaha Burley was immediately hired as his replacement after serving as the offensive coordinator of the Arena Football League's Cleveland Gladiators.

== Standings ==
2017 National Arena League standings
	W	L	PCT	PF	PA	GB	STK
z – Jacksonville Sharks	11	1	.917	697	299	—	L1
y – Lehigh Valley Steelhawks	9	1	.900	610	349	1.0	W7
x – Columbus Lions	9	3	.750	689	412	2.0	W6
x – Monterrey Steel	7	4	.636	478	364	3.5	W1
High Country Grizzlies	3	7	.300	449	484	7.0	L4
Georgia Firebirds	2	9	.182	372	576	8.5	L5
Dayton Wolfpack	0	7	.000	125	478	8.5	L7
Corpus Christi Rage	0	9	.000	166	624	9.5	L9

z – clinched home field advantage

y – clinched home playoff game

x – clinched playoff spot

== Schedule ==
=== Regular season ===
The 2017 regular season schedule was released on December 9, 2016

Key: Win Tie Loss Bye

All start times are local time

Week	Day	Date	Kickoff	Opponent	Results		Location
Week	Day	Date	Kickoff	Opponent	Score	Record	Location
1	Friday	March 17	7:00pm	at Columbus Lions	W 56–41	1–0	Columbus Civic Center
2	Saturday	March 25	7:00pm	Georgia Firebirds	W 55–26	2–0	Jacksonville Veterans Memorial Arena
3	Saturday	April 1	7:00pm	Lehigh Valley Steelhawks	W 57–43	3–0	Jacksonville Veterans Memorial Arena
4	Sunday	April 9	7:00pm	at High Country Grizzlies	W 68–21	4–0	George M. Holmes Convocation Center
5	BYE						
6	Monday	April 24	7:00pm	at Monterrey Steel	W 60–21	5–0	Arena Monterrey
7	Saturday	April 29	7:00pm	Columbus Lions	W 37–28	6–0	Jacksonville Veterans Memorial Arena
8	Saturday	May 6	7:00pm	Corpus Christi Rage	W 71–6	7–0	Jacksonville Veterans Memorial Arena
9	BYE						
10	Saturday	May 20	7:00pm	Monterrey Steel	W 42–13	8–0	Jacksonville Veterans Memorial Arena
11	Sunday	May 28	7:00pm	at Corpus Christi Rage	W 71–6	9–0	American Bank Center
12	Saturday	June 3	7:00pm	Dayton Wolfpack	W 77–32	10–0	Jacksonville Veterans Memorial Arena
13	Saturday	June 10	7:00pm	High Country Grizzlies	W 66–18	11–0	Jacksonville Veterans Memorial Arena
14	Saturday	June 17	7:00pm	Monterrey Steel	L 37–44	11–1	Jacksonville Veterans Memorial Arena

=== Postseason ===
Round	Day	Date	Kickoff	Opponent	Results		Location
Round	Day	Date	Kickoff	Opponent	Score	Record	Location
First Round	Saturday	June 24	7:00pm	Monterrey Steel	W 43–32	1–0	Jacksonville Veterans Memorial Arena
Championship	Monday	July 10	7:00pm	Columbus Lions	W 27–21	2–0	Jacksonville Veterans Memorial Arena

== Roster ==
2017 Jacksonville Sharks roster
Quarterbacks: 2 Jason Boltus; 17 Damien Fleming; Running backs: 39 Derrick Ross; Wide receivers: 6 Thyron Lewis; 3 Darryl Thompson; 5 Emughedi Umodu; 15 Maurice Williams; 10 Devin Wilson	Offensive linemen: 98 A. J. Harmon; 72 Cornelius Lewis; 93 Moqut Ruffins; Defensive linemen: 18 Keith Bowers; 99 Damien Jacobs; 95 Bryson Kelly; 44 Dale Pierson; 56 Jeremiah Price; 55 Skyler Skersick	Linebackers: 42 Ray Hodgson; 11 Charles Hunt; Defensive backs: 21 Jabari Gorman; 14 Terry Johnson; 7 Erick McIntosh; 1 Micheaux Robinson; 9 Peter Tulloch; Kickers: 12 Nick Belcher	Reserve lists: 81 Will Dukes WR (Susp.); 14 Daniel Farley QB (Exempt); 4 Tommy Grady QB (IR); 81 Joe Hills WR (Exempt); 5 David Hyland DB (Susp.); 33 Montavis Mack OL (IR); 2 Marvin Ross DB (Exempt); 9 Schon Thomas DB (IR); 9 Marquel Wade WR (IR); Rookies in italics Roster updated July 5, 2017; 25 Active, 9 Inactive
