= Malachi Jones (gridiron football) =

American gridiron football player (born 1994)

No. 14
- Position: Wide receiver

Personal information
- Born: March 22, 1994 (age 32); Lawrenceville, Georgia, U.S.
- Listed height: 6 ft 3 in (1.91 m)
- Listed weight: 215 lb (98 kg)

Career information
- High school: Central Gwinnett (Lawrenceville)
- College: Appalachian State
- NFL draft: 2016: undrafted

Career history
- Atlanta Falcons (2016)*; High Country Grizzlies (2017); Atlanta Havoc (2018); Albany Empire (2018); Chicago Bears (2018)*; Atlanta Legends (2019); Albany Empire (2019); Montreal Alouettes (2020–2021)*; Albany Empire (2021); Carolina Cobras (2022)
- * Offseason or practice squad member only

Awards and highlights
- ArenaBowl champion (2019); 2× First-team All-Arena (2018, 2019); AFL Offensive Player of the Year (2019); AFL Rookie of the Year (2018); 2× AFL Wide Receiver of the Year (2018, 2019); NAL champion (2021); NAL championship MVP (2021); NAL Offensive Rookie of the Year (2017); SoCon All-Freshman Team (2012); College Sports Journal Freshman-All American (2012)

Career AFL statistics
- Receptions: 173
- Receiving yards: 2,596
- Receiving touchdowns: 54
- Rushing touchdowns: 6
- Stats at ArenaFan.com

Malachi Fitzgerald Jones (born March 22, 1994) is an American former professional football wide receiver. He played college football for the Appalachian State Mountaineers.

== Early life ==
Jones attended Central Gwinnett High School in Lawrenceville, Georgia.

Rated a two-star prospect by Rivals.com & a three-star by Scout.com. Led Gwinnett County with 82 receptions, 1,059 receiving yards, 14 touchdowns & 12.9 yards per catch in 2011. Received second-team all-state and first-team all-county recognition in 2011. Participated in the 2010 RisingSeniors.com Georgia Junior Bowl. Broke school and county records for receptions (15) & receiving yards (276) in a game & receptions in a season (82). Coached by Todd Wofford.

College recruiting
Name	Hometown	School	Height	Weight	40^{‡}	Commit date
Malachi Jones; WR	Lawrenceville, Georgia	Central Gwinnett High School	6 ft 1 in (1.85 m)	182 lb (83 kg)	4.5	Jan 22, 2012
Malachi Jones; WR	Recruit ratings: Scout: Rivals: 247Sports:					
Overall recruit ranking: Scout: 90 (WR) Rivals: -- (WR), -- (GA)
Note: In many cases, Scout, Rivals, 247Sports, On3, and ESPN may conflict in their listings of height and weight.; In these cases, the average was taken. ESPN grades are on a 100-point scale.; Sources: "Appalachian State Football Commitments". Rivals.; "2012 Appalachian State Football Commits". Scout.; "Scout.com Team Recruiting Rankings". Scout.; "2012 Team Ranking". Rivals.com.

Jones committed to Appalachian State University on January 22, 2012. Jones chose Appalachian State over football scholarships from Chattanooga, Georgia Southern, Louisiana–Monroe & Presbyterian.

== College career ==
Jones played four seasons for the Appalachian State Mountaineers of Appalachian State University.

Jones caught 124 passes for 1,711 yards and eight touchdowns in four seasons at Appalachian State. Appeared in all 49 games during his Mountaineer career and made 35 starts at wide receiver.

Earned Freshman All-America recognition from College Sports Journal & named to Southern Conference’s All-Freshman team in 2012.

== Professional career ==
Jones was rated the 83rd best wide receiver in the 2016 NFL draft by NFLDraftScout.com.

Pre-draft measurables
Height	Weight	Arm length	Hand span	40-yard dash	10-yard split	20-yard split	20-yard shuttle	Three-cone drill	Vertical jump	Broad jump	Bench press
6 ft 1 3/4 in (1.87 m)	211 lb (96 kg)	32 1/4 in (0.82 m)	9 5/8 in (0.24 m)	4.53 s	1.51 s	2.57 s	4.30 s	6.90 s	37.5 in (0.95 m)	10 ft 5 in (3.18 m)	14 reps
All values from Pro Day

=== Atlanta Falcons ===
Jones signed a free agent deal with the Atlanta Falcons of the National Football League (NFL) on May 5, 2016, following the 2016 draft. However, he was waived on May 7, 2016, after rookie mini camp.

=== High Country Grizzlies ===
Jones signed with the High Country Grizzlies of the National Arena League (NAL). Jones caught 66 passes for 685 yards and 16 touchdowns in 10 games, and was awarded the 2017 National Arena League Offensive Rookie of the Year.

=== Atlanta Havoc ===
For 2018, Jones signed with the Atlanta Havoc (now the Carolina Havoc) of the newly formed American Arena League, but departed after one game to join the AFL.

=== Albany Empire ===
Jones was assigned to the Albany Empire of the Arena Football League (AFL) for 2018. In 12 regular season games, Jones had 77 receptions for 1,156 yards and 29 touchdowns along with 5 rushing touchdowns. Jones scored at least once in every game played, and passed the 100 yards receiving mark in a game on four occasions during the regular season. He won the 2018 Arena Football League Rookie of the Year Award and Wide Receiver of the Year, becoming the only rookie in league history to win both awards in the same season. Jones was also recognized with First-team All Arena honors for 2018. For the postseason, Albany played in two playoff games, where Jones surpassed the century mark in each of these, and caught 7 more touchdowns. Jones left his day job in marketing to play in the AFL.

=== Chicago Bears ===
On July 26, 2018, Jones signed with the Chicago Bears. He was waived on September 1, 2018.

=== Atlanta Legends ===
In October 2018, Jones signed with the Atlanta Legends of the Alliance of American Football (AAF).

Jones finished the 2019 season with 22 receptions for 312 yards and 2 touchdowns through 8 games. This was good enough to be ranked 10th in AAF's receiving yards and tied for 6th in touchdown catches. Jones also had two carries for 16 yards.

=== Second stint with Empire ===
After the AAF suspended football operations, Jones re-signed with the Albany Empire of the AFL on April 10, 2019. For the first game of the year, Jones contributed to the win with 11 catches for 94 yards and a score. After recording back to back games with over 100 receiving yards and 2 touchdowns, Jones was suspended so that he could work out with the Tennessee Titans of the NFL. Jones did not miss a game, having been reinstated in time for a 10 catch, 179 yard and 3 touchdown performance in week 4 to keep Albany undefeated. It was not until Jones' streak of 5 games with 100 yards receiving was broken that the Empire had their first loss of the season. In 12 regular season games, Jones had 9 games with at least 100 yards receiving, and continued his streak of scoring at least once in every game of the regular season. He finished with 1,440 yards and 25 touchdown catches; Jones was the only AFL receiver with at least 1,000 yards in 2019, a year which culminated in Jones and the Empire winning ArenaBowl XXXII.

=== Montreal Alouettes ===
In October 2019, Jones was selected in the 10th round (74th overall) by the Seattle Dragons in the Skills Portion of the 2020 XFL draft.

Jones did not sign with the XFL, and instead signed a two-year contract with the Montreal Alouettes of the Canadian Football League on December 4, 2019. He was placed on the retired list by the team on June 22, 2021, after receiving a job offer from Lululemon.

=== Third stint with Empire ===
Jones signed with the relaunched Albany Empire of the NAL on June 17, 2021.

=== Carolina Cobras ===
On July 14, 2022, Jones signed with the Carolina Cobras of the NAL.

== Career statistics ==
=== NAL ===
Year	Team			
Year	Team	Rec	Yds	TD
2017	High Country	66	685	16
Career		66	685	16

=== AFL ===
==== Regular season ====
Year	Team	GP	Receiving				Rushing			
Year	Team	GP	Rec	Yds	Avg	TD	Rush	Yds	Avg	TD
2018	Albany	12	77	1,156	15.0	29	21	40	1.9	5
2019	Albany	12	96	1,440	15.0	25	6	17	2.8	1
Total		24	173	2,596	15.0	54	27	57	2.1	6

==== Playoffs ====
Year	Team	GP	Receiving				Rushing			
Year	Team	GP	Rec	Yds	Avg	TD	Rush	Yds	Avg	TD
2018	Albany	2	17	283	16.6	7	2	6	3.0	0
2019	Albany	2	8	136	17.0	1	2	-6	-3.0	0
Total		4	25	419	16.8	8	4	0	0	0

=== AAF ===
Year	Team	GP	Receiving				Rushing			
Year	Team	GP	Rec	Yds	Avg	TD	Rush	Yds	Avg	TD
2019	ATL	8	22	312	14.2	2	2	16	8.0	0
Total		8	22	312	14.2	2	2	16	8.0	0

=== College ===
Year	Team	Receiving				
Year	Team	Rec	Yards	Avg	Yds/G	TD
2012	Appalachian State	32	370	11.6	30.8	2
2013	Appalachian State	31	293	9.5	24.4	0
2014	Appalachian State	36	585	16.2	48.8	3
2015	Appalachian State	25	463	18.5	35.6	3
Career		124	1,711	13.8	34.9	8

== Personal life ==
His father, Andre Jones, was a starting defensive end on the 1988 Notre Dame Fighting Irish football team. He was drafted in the 7th round of the 1991 NFL Draft by the Pittsburgh Steelers. He also played for the Detroit Lions and the Winnipeg Blue Bombers of the Canadian Football League (CFL).

His older brother, T. J. Jones, a former Notre Dame football player, was drafted by the Detroit Lions during the 2014 NFL draft. His other younger brother, Jahmai Jones, was drafted by the Los Angeles Angels 70th overall in the 2015 MLB draft, and currently plays for the Boston Red Sox.

Jones’s godfather, Raghib "Rocket" Ismail, finished second in voting for the 1990 Heisman Trophy at Notre Dame and recorded over 5,000 receiving yards in nine NFL seasons.
