= Corpus Christi Rage =

American indoor football team

Logo

General information
- Founded: 2016
- Folded: 2017
- Headquartered: Corpus Christi, Texas at the American Bank Center
- Colors: Black, Red, White
- CCRage.com

Personnel
- Owner: Eric Smith
- General manager: Leonard Harris
- Head coach: Steven Fillmore
- President: Eric Smith

Team history
- Corpus Christi Rage (2017)

Home fields
- American Bank Center (2017)

League / conference affiliations
- National Arena League (2017)

The Corpus Christi Rage was a professional indoor football team and a charter member of the National Arena League (NAL) that began play in its inaugural 2017 season. Based in Corpus Christi, Texas, the Rage played their home games at the American Bank Center.

The Rage were the third arena/indoor football team to call Corpus Christi home, following the Corpus Christi Hammerheads/Fury, which played in eight different leagues from 2004 until 2016, and the Corpus Christi Sharks, which played in the af2 from 2007 until 2009.

== History ==
On October 17, 2016, the Rage announced they had joined the new Arena Developmental League (which then became the National Arena League) in an introductory press conference, with their logo and color scheme unveiled that day. The Rage were owned by Corpus Christi-area businessman Eric Dee Smith, who is an Army veteran and a former corrections officer, with Leonard Harris serving as the team's general manager. The ADL officially confirmed the Rage's membership on October 28.

After the team's fourth game of their inaugural 2017 season, the Rage's operations were apparently taken over by the league from owner Eric Smith. Afterwards, the Rage had two home games cancelled during the season by the league: the first being the May 20 game against the Georgia Firebirds, which was cancelled as a cost-cutting measure as the league had also taken control of the Firebirds franchise the week before, and their final June 16 game against the High Country Grizzlies as both teams had already been eliminated from playoff contention. Neither game was considered a forfeit; they were simply erased from the league schedules as a no contest. The Rage folded during the last week of the season.

== Statistics and records ==
=== Season-by-season results ===
League champions	Conference champions	Division champions	Playoff berth	League leader

Season	Team	League	Conference	Division	Regular season				Postseason results
Season	Team	League	Conference	Division	Finish	Wins	Losses	Ties	Postseason results
2017	2017	NAL			8th	0	9	0	

=== Head coach ===
Name	Term	Regular season				Playoffs		Awards
Name	Term	W	L	T	Win%	W	L	Awards
Steven Fillmore	2017	0	9	0	.000	—	—	

== 2017 roster ==
2017 Corpus Christi Rage roster
Quarterbacks: 11 Kyle Cool; 12 Jake Jablonski; Fullbacks: 35 Earnest Thomas; Wide receivers: 14 Derick Fleming; 12 Arvin Jackson; 2 J. J. McGee; 7 Ed Victorian	Offensive linemen: -- Sedrick Flowers; 65 Fred Gaines; 60 Xavier Ruben; Defensive linemen: 19 Roland Bordelon; 21 Anthony Gonzales; 56 Travis Stephens; 99 Armonti Yharbrough	Linebackers: 10 Thornton Chandler; Defensive backs: 20 Champ Glory; 13 Rush Imhotep; 30 Jamal Marshall; 5 Keith Marshall; Special teams: 17 Jimmy Allen	Reserve lists: 9 DeAndre Fillmore LB (Exempt); -- Larry Mbayu DL (Exempt); 18 Darryl Simon LB (Susp.); -- Isaiah Taylor WR (IR); -- Johnny Thomas WR (Susp.); -- Steve Weingarten QB (IR); -- Wes Worthen DB (Susp.); -- George Williams (Susp.); Rookies in italics Roster updated May 26, 2017; 20 Active, 8 Inactive

== Coaching staff ==
Corpus Christi Rage staff
Front office: Majority owner and president – Eric Dee Smith; Executive vice president of football operations – Bennie King; Minority owner and general manager – Leonard Harris	Head coach: Head coach – Steven Fillmore; Assistant coaches: Assistant coach and director of football personnel – Gerald Dockery

== 2017 season ==
2017 Corpus Christi Rage season
- Owner: Eric Smith
- Head coach: Steven Filmore
- Home stadium: American Bank Center

Results
- Record: 0–9
- Conference place: 8th
- Playoffs: Did not qualify

=== Schedule ===
Key: Win Tie Loss Bye

All start times are local time

Week	Day	Date	Kickoff	Opponent	Results		Location
Week	Day	Date	Kickoff	Opponent	Score	Record	Location
1	Monday	March 20	6:00pm	at Monterrey Steel	L 12–55	0–1	Arena Monterrey
2	Sunday	March 26	6:00pm	Columbus Lions	L 18–85	0–2	American Bank Center
3	Monday	April 3	6:00pm	at Monterrey Steel	L 28–57	0–3	Arena Monterrey
4	Saturday	April 8	7:00pm	at Georgia Firebirds	L 26–76	0–4	Albany Civic Center
5	Sunday	April 16	7:00pm	at Dayton Wolfpack	Cancelled (Note: Dayton Wolfpack folded due to not having a home arena; replaced by a travel only team based out of Atlanta)		
6	BYE						
7	Saturday	April 29	7:00pm	at Lehigh Valley Steelhawks	L 28–95	0–5	PPL Center
8	Saturday	May 6	7:00pm	at Jacksonville Sharks	L 6–71	0–6	Jacksonville Veterans Memorial Arena
9	Monday	May 15	6:00pm	Monterrey Steel	L 30–33	0–7	American Bank Center
10	Saturday	May 20	6:00pm	Georgia Firebirds	Cancelled (Note: Game cancelled by the Firebirds due to not wanting to travel to Corpus Christi)		American Bank Center
11	Sunday	May 28	6:00pm	Jacksonville Sharks	L 6–71	0–8	American Bank Center
12	Saturday	June 3	7:00pm	at Columbus Lions	L 12–81	0–9	Columbus Civic Center
13	BYE						
14	Friday	June 16	6:00pm	High Country Grizzlies	Cancelled (Note: Game cancelled by the Rage as the team suspended operations the week prior.)		American Bank Center
