= Dexter Jackson (wide receiver) =

American football player (born 1987)

No. 10, 89, 2
- Position: Wide receiver

Personal information
- Born: August 5, 1986 (age 40); Decatur, Georgia, U.S.
- Listed height: 5 ft 9 in (1.75 m)
- Listed weight: 182 lb (83 kg)

Career information
- High school: Dunwoody (Dunwoody, Georgia)
- College: Appalachian State (2004–2007)
- NFL draft: 2008: 2nd round, 58th overall pick

Career history
- Tampa Bay Buccaneers (2008); Carolina Panthers (2009–2010)*; Virginia Destroyers (2011); New York Jets (2011–2012)*; High Country Grizzlies (2017)
- * Offseason or practice squad member only

Awards and highlights
- 3× NCAA Division I-AA/FCS national champion (2005, 2006, 2007)

Career NFL statistics
- Return yards: 424
- Stats at Pro Football Reference

Dexter Myles Jackson (born August 5, 1986) is an American former professional football player who was a wide receiver in the National Football League (NFL). He was selected by the Tampa Bay Buccaneers in the second round of the 2008 NFL draft. He played college football for the Appalachian State Mountaineers. Jackson was also a member of the Carolina Panthers, Virginia Destroyers, New York Jets and High Country Grizzlies.

== Early life ==
He attended and played high school football at Dunwoody High School in Dunwoody, Georgia.

== College career ==
Jackson proved key in one of college football's biggest upsets, recording two touchdowns and 92 yards as well as 19 yards rushing, in the Mountaineers' 34-32 Week 1 win over the No. 5 ranked Michigan Wolverines in 2007. A photograph of Jackson running the ball past the Michigan defense was featured on the cover of the September 10, 2007 edition of Sports Illustrated.

== Professional career ==
Pre-draft measurables
Height	Weight	Arm length	Hand span	40-yard dash	10-yard split	20-yard split	20-yard shuttle	Three-cone drill	Vertical jump	Broad jump	Bench press
5 ft 9 1/2 in (1.77 m)	182 lb (83 kg)	30 5/8 in (0.78 m)	8 5/8 in (0.22 m)	4.37 s	1.53 s	2.54 s	4.15 s	6.81 s	30.5 in (0.77 m)	10 ft 2 in (3.10 m)	11 reps
All values from NFL Combine/Pro Day

=== Tampa Bay Buccaneers ===
Jackson was drafted by the Tampa Bay Buccaneers in the second round (58th overall) of the 2008 NFL draft. On July 25, he signed a four-year contract. He played seven games for the team in 2008.

The Buccaneers waived Jackson on August 31, 2009.

=== Carolina Panthers ===
The Carolina Panthers signed Jackson to their practice squad on October 12, 2009. After his contract expired following the season, he was re-signed to a future contract on January 4, 2010. Jackson was waived by the Panthers on August 31, 2010.

=== Virginia Destroyers ===
Jackson was signed by the Virginia Destroyers of the United Football League on May 23, 2011.

=== New York Jets ===
Jackson was signed to the New York Jets' practice squad on November 9, 2011. He was released on November 19. He was re-signed to the practice squad on November 30. Jackson was waived on August 25, 2012.

=== High Country Grizzlies ===
On December 19, 2016, Jackson signed with the High Country Grizzlies of the National Arena League (NAL) to be the marquee player and face of the team for marketing and ticket sales during their inaugural 2017 season. He agreed to a contract that included sales incentives and a relocation reimbursement for Jackson and his family. Jackson initially requested his ticket sales incentives in February prior to the start of the season, but Jackson would leave the team over non-payment in May and the league suspended Jackson. In August, Jackson took the Grizzlies to arbitration with the league and the NAL ruled in Jackson's favor with the team owing Jackson US$9,500. Jackson filed another complaint with Watauga County over continued non-payment by the team as of January 2018.
