= Dayton Wolfpack =

General information
- Founded: 2016
- Folded: 2017
- Colors: Black, red, silver, white
- Traveling team only DaytonWolfpack.com

Team history
- Dayton Wolfpack (2017)

League / conference affiliations
- National Arena League (2017)

The Dayton Wolfpack were a professional indoor football team and a charter member of the National Arena League (NAL) in its inaugural 2017 season. Originally to be based in Dayton, Ohio, the Wolfpack had announced their home venue as the Nutter Center but apparently failed to reach a lease agreement. The Wolfpack were then listed as a traveling team by the NAL.

The Wolfpack would have been the sixth indoor football team to call Dayton home, following the Dayton Skyhawks of the original Indoor Football League (1999–2000), the Dayton Warbirds/Bulldogs of the National Indoor Football League (2005–2006), The Marshals also of the NIFL (2007), the Dayton Silverbacks of the Continental Indoor Football League (2011–2012) and finally the Dayton Sharks also of the CIFL (2013–2014).

== History ==
On August 11, 2016, the Arena Developmental League (which then became the National Arena League) officially announced the Wolfpack as its fourth charter team, following the previously announced Columbus Lions, High Country Grizzlies and Lehigh Valley Steelhawks. The team was originally announced to be led by head coach Derrick Shepard and owners Jerome and Jesse Clark.

Over social media, the owners of the Wolfpack announced they would be playing at the Nutter Center and the NAL made the schedule listing the Nutter as their home venue. Due to the Jacksonville Sharks needing to fulfill their previous eight home contract with their arena from their time in the Arena Football League, the Wolfpack and Corpus Christi Rage each were only scheduled for five home games, with four home games of the Wolfpack's falling on a Monday. However, by February 2017, several signed players reported over social media that they had all been released from their contracts due to lack of a home venue. By February 20, the NAL had removed their home games from the schedule, leaving the Wolfpack as a traveling team. Also over social media, Marcus Ray announced he would be operating the Wolfpack traveling team out of the Atlanta area for the season.

Later in the season, Erasmus Harvey announced his new team, the Georgia Doom, would play the Georgia Firebirds as the Dayton Wolfpack for the April 29 game in Albany.

The Wolfpack were not listed as members of the league after the NAL 2017 summer meetings concluded.

== Season-by-season results ==
League champions	Conference champions	Division champions	Playoff berth	League leader

Season	Team	League	Conference	Division	Regular season				Postseason results
Season	Team	League	Conference	Division	Finish	Wins	Losses	Ties	Postseason results
2017	2017	NAL			7th	0	7	0	

== 2017 season ==
2017 Dayton Wolfpack season
- Home stadium: Traveling team

Results
- Record: 0–7
- Conference place: 7th
- Playoffs: Did not qualify

=== Schedule ===
Key: Win Tie Loss Bye

All start times were local time

Week	Day	Date	Kickoff	Opponent	Results		Location
Week	Day	Date	Kickoff	Opponent	Score	Record	Location
1	Sunday	March 19	4:00pm	at Lehigh Valley Steelhawks	L 25–66	0–1	PPL Center
2	Monday	March 27	7:00pm	at Monterrey Steel	L 24–61	0–2	Arena Monterrey
3	Saturday	April 1	7:00pm	at High Country Grizzles	L 6–94	0–3	George M. Holmes Convocation Center
4	Monday	April 10	7:05pm	Monterrey Steel	Cancelled (Note: Originally scheduled home game for the Wolfpack, cancelled when the team became a traveling team.)		
5	Sunday	April 16	7:05pm	Corpus Christi Rage	Cancelled		
6	BYE						
7	Saturday	April 29	7:00pm	at Georgia Firebirds	L 32–35	0–4	Albany Civic Center
8	Saturday	May 6	7:00pm	at Lehigh Valley Steelhawks	L 6–68	0–5	PPL Center
9	Monday	May 15	7:05pm	High Country Grizzlies	Cancelled		
10	Saturday	May 20	7:00pm	at Columbus Lions	L 0–77	0–6	Columbus Civic Center
11	Monday	May 29	7:05pm	Lehigh Valley Steelhawks	Cancelled		
12	Saturday	June 3	7:00pm	at Jacksonville Sharks	L 32–77	0–7	Jacksonville Veterans Memorial Arena
13	BYE						
14	Monday	June 19	7:05pm	Lehigh Valley Steelhawks	Cancelled		

=== Roster ===
2017 Dayton Wolfpack roster
Quarterbacks: 4 Efi Eyo; Fullbacks: 12 Aaron Appleby; Wide receivers: 9 Cory Alberty; 15 DeQuavious Barbin; 1 Lajuantae Hicks; 2 Brian Robinson; 3 DeMarcus Sweat	Offensive linemen: 30 Kirk Holcombe; 75 Terry Johnson; 70 William Kohliem; 44 Zachariah Taylor; Defensive linemen: 78 Dillon Berryhill; 11 Darrick Cannon; 10 Carl Green; 48 Darius Murphy; -- Stephen Williams	Linebackers: 6 Vaughn Cornelia; 8 Justin Spruill; Defensive backs: 15 Vincent Bridges; 5 Louis Brown; 14 Daryl Thomas; 7 Terez Wilkins; Special teams: 25 Zach Holley	Reserve lists: -- Malcolm Moulton DB (Susp.); 20 Rashawn Robinson FB (IR); Rookies in italics Roster updated June 3, 2017; 23 Active, 2 Inactive
