= Jacoby Jones =

American football player (1984–2024)

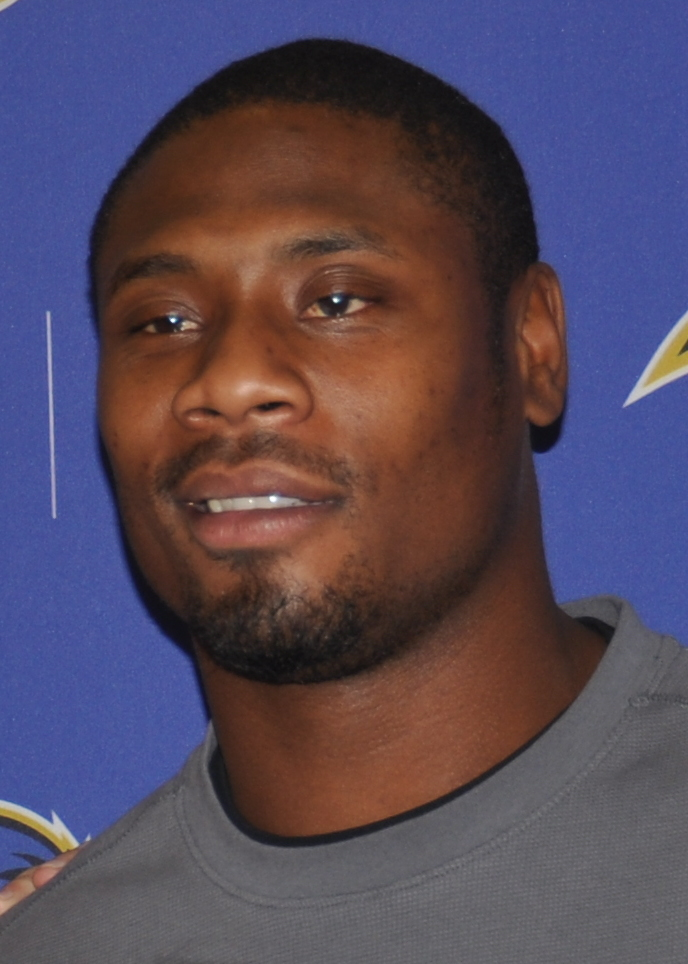
- Jones in 2014

No. 12, 13
- Position: Wide receiver / Return specialist

Personal information
- Born: July 11, 1984; New Orleans, Louisiana, U.S.
- Died: July 14, 2024 (aged 40); New Orleans, Louisiana, U.S.
- Listed height: 6 ft 3 in (1.91 m)
- Listed weight: 215 lb (98 kg)

Career information
- High school: Marion Abramson (New Orleans)
- College: Lane (2003–2006)
- NFL draft: 2007: 3rd round, 73rd overall pick

Career history

Playing
- Houston Texans (2007–2011); Baltimore Ravens (2012–2014); San Diego Chargers (2015); Pittsburgh Steelers (2015); Monterrey Steel (2017)

Coaching
- Lane (2018–2019) Wide receivers coach; Calvert Hall College HS (2020) Wide receivers coach; Morgan State (2021) Tight ends coach; Alabama State (2022–2023) Wide receivers coach

Awards and highlights
- Super Bowl champion (XLVII); First-team All-Pro (2012) (Note: Selected as a kick returner); Pro Bowl (2012); SIAC Most Valuable Player (2006); SIAC Offensive Player of the Year (2006); 4× All-SIAC (2003–2006)

Career NFL statistics
- Receptions: 203
- Receiving yards: 2,733
- Receiving touchdowns: 14
- Return yards: 7,628
- Return touchdowns: 9
- Stats at Pro Football Reference

Jacoby Rashi'd Jones (July 11, 1984 – July 14, 2024) was an American professional football player who was a wide receiver and return specialist in the National Football League (NFL). Selected in the third round of the 2007 NFL draft by the Houston Texans, Jones also played with the Baltimore Ravens, San Diego Chargers, and Pittsburgh Steelers before playing with the Monterrey Steel of the National Arena League in 2017.

Jones played college football for the Lane College Dragons before playing for the Texans from 2007 to 2011. Jones then played for the Ravens from 2012 to 2014, and was selected for the Pro Bowl in 2012. He was known for two of the most memorable plays in the 2012 NFL playoffs as a member of the Ravens: catching a 70-yard game-tying touchdown pass in the final seconds of regulation in the AFC Divisional playoff game against the Denver Broncos, which helped lead the Ravens to an eventual 38–35 double overtime victory; and a 108-yard kickoff return for a touchdown in Super Bowl XLVII against the San Francisco 49ers, the longest play in Super Bowl history, and tied for the longest kickoff return in NFL history at the time At the time of his death he was the wide receivers coach at Alabama State University.

== Early life ==
Jones lived in New Orleans East. Jones attended St. Augustine High School and Marion Abramson High School in New Orleans, Louisiana. As a second-year student (junior) at St. Augustine he learned that the school considered him too small to play on the football team. Allen Woods, his godfather and the assistant principal of Abramson, advised him to transfer to that school. His childhood house and high school were destroyed by Hurricane Katrina.

== College career ==
Jones originally enrolled on a track scholarship at Southeastern Louisiana University in 2002, but transferred to the Division II school Lane College in 2003. At Lane College, Jones became a four-time All-Southern Intercollegiate Athletic Conference (SIAC) selection. Jones was a member of Omega Psi Phi fraternity.

In 2024, he was inducted to the SIAC Hall of Fame in Atlanta.

== Professional career ==
Pre-draft measurables
Height	Weight	Arm length	Hand span	40-yard dash	10-yard split	20-yard split	20-yard shuttle	Three-cone drill	Vertical jump	Broad jump
6 ft 2 5/8 in (1.90 m)	210 lb (95 kg)	34 1/4 in (0.87 m)	8 1/8 in (0.21 m)	4.53 s	1.65 s	2.66 s	4.31 s	7.03 s	34.0 in (0.86 m)	10 ft 9 in (3.28 m)
All values from NFL Combine

=== Houston Texans ===
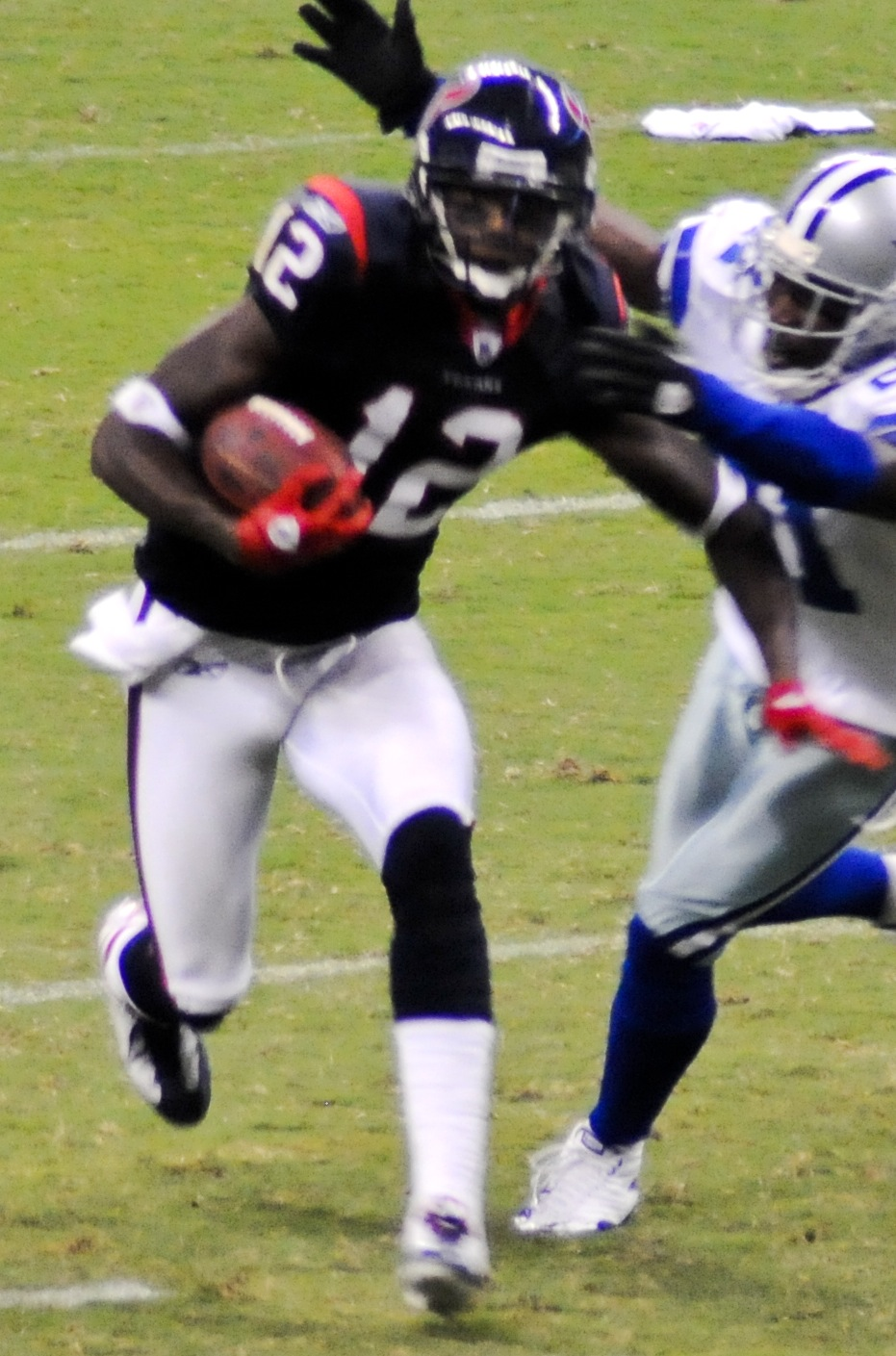
Jones while playing for the Texans in 2010

Jones was drafted by the Houston Texans in the third round (73rd overall) of the 2007 NFL draft. For his first-career touchdown, he returned a punt for a 70-yard score against Miami in week 6 of the 2008 season. Jones continued to contribute as both a receiver and a returner for the Texans. At the end of the 2009 regular season, he was named as an alternate kick returner for the AFC squad to the 2010 Pro Bowl. In the 2010 season, Jones caught five passes for 115 yards in Week 16 at Denver, recording his first 100-yard game in the NFL.

On January 15, 2012, early in the 2011 AFC Divisional Playoff game, Jones muffed a punt, when he was rushed by Cary Williams and the ball was recovered inside the Texans 5-yard line by Jimmy Smith, in a play that contributed to the Texans' elimination by the Baltimore Ravens. Jones was subsequently released by the Texans on May 1, 2012.

In his 5 seasons with Houston, he caught 127 passes for 2,733 yards and 14 touchdowns, making an impact as a return specialist, returning kickoffs and punts for four total touchdowns.

=== Baltimore Ravens ===
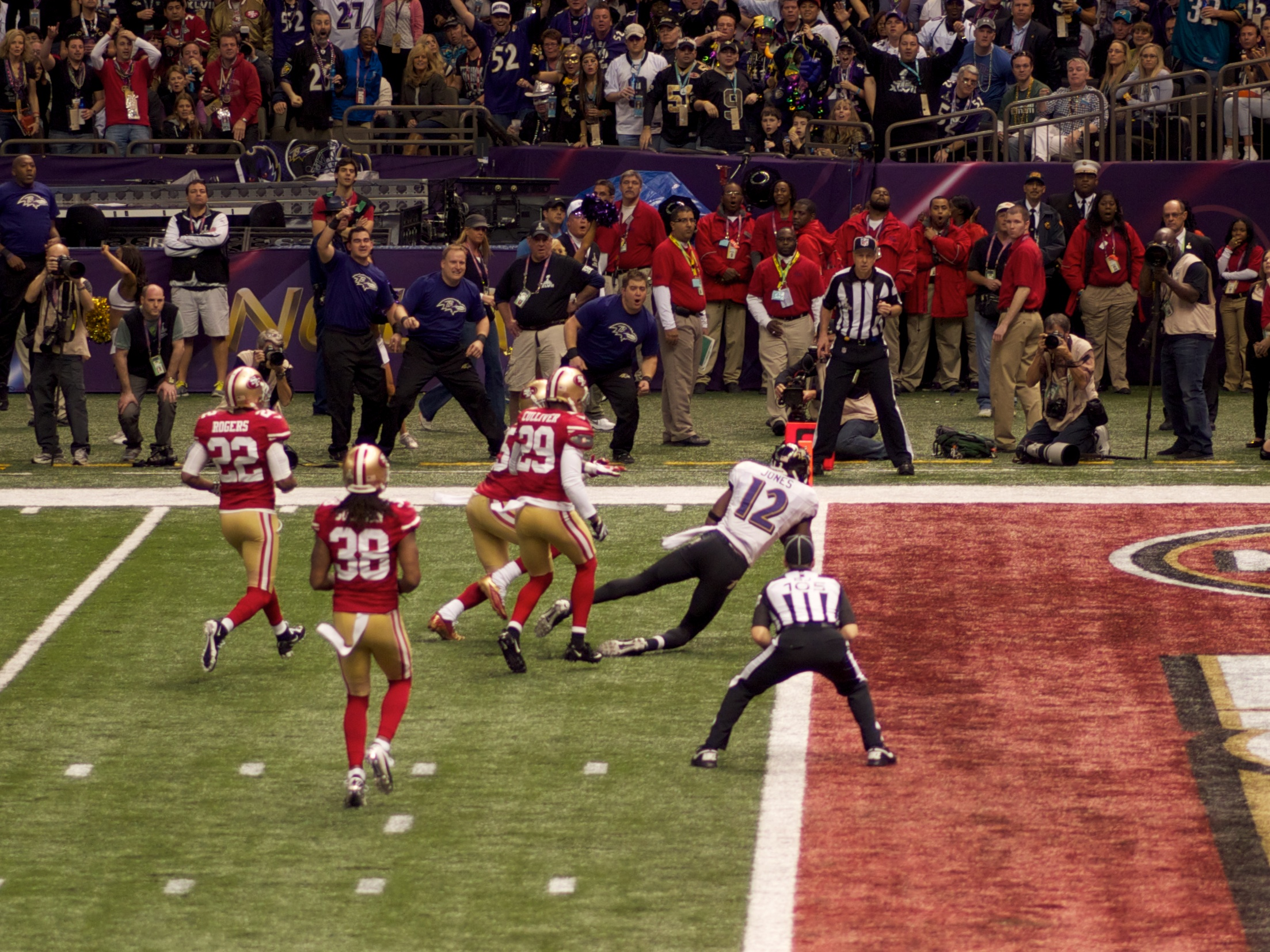
Jones scoring a touchdown during second quarter of Super Bowl XLVII

On May 8, 2012, Jones signed a two-year, $7 million deal with the Baltimore Ravens.

On October 14, 2012, Jones returned a kickoff for 108 yards and a touchdown in a win against the Dallas Cowboys, tying an NFL record for longest kick return. On November 11, 2012, Jones returned a kick-off for 105 yards in the Ravens' 55–20 win over Oakland Raiders, becoming the first player to return two kicks for 105 yards or more in a season. On November 18, 2012, in a division game against the rival Pittsburgh Steelers, Jones returned a punt 63 yards for a touchdown, helping the Ravens win the game 13–10. It was the first time the Ravens returned a punt for a touchdown against the Steelers.

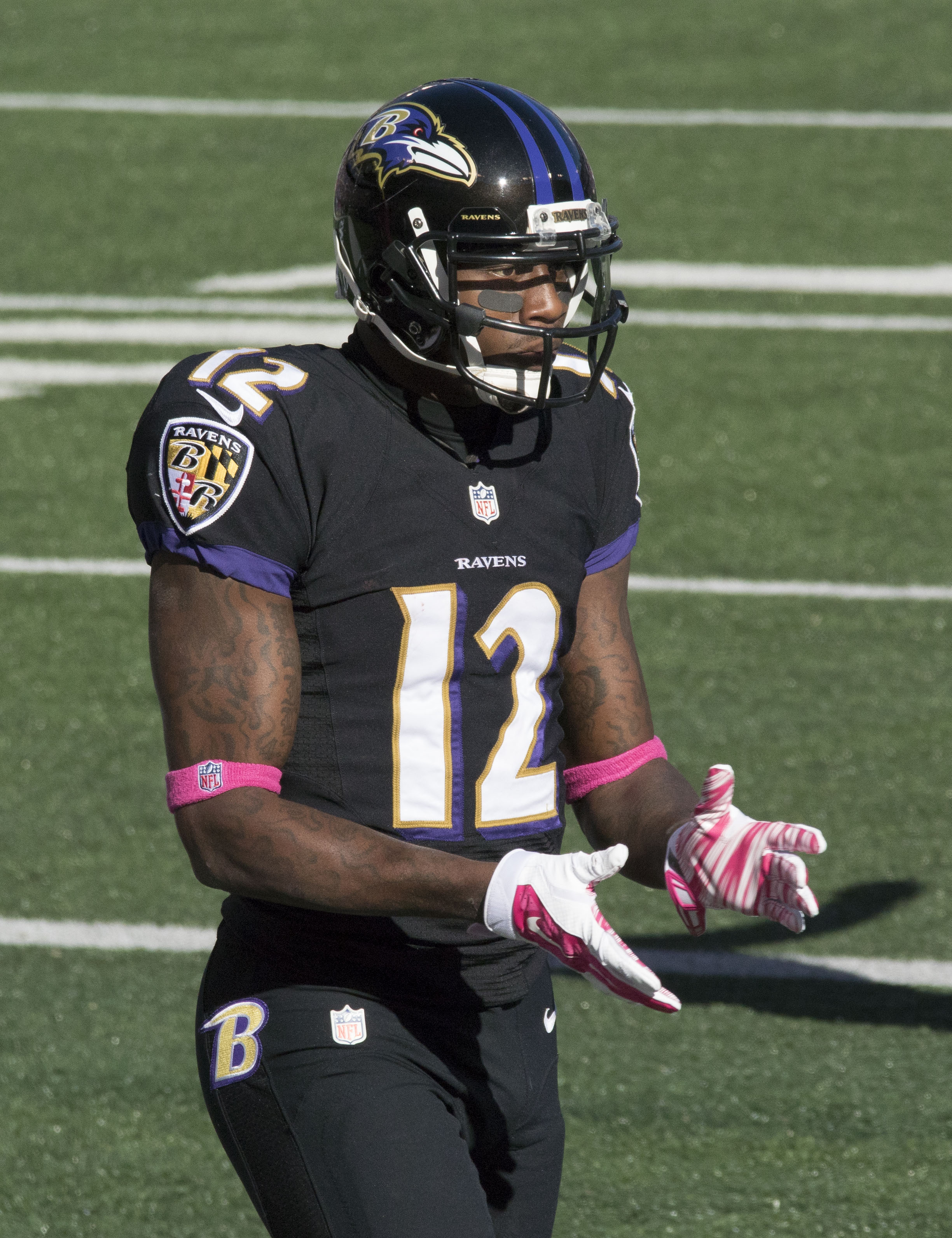
Jones with the Ravens in 2014.

Jones was named to his first Pro Bowl as a kick returner for the AFC roster and was selected for the 2012 All-Pro team. His stellar play would continue in the playoffs. On January 12, 2013, in the AFC Divisional Playoff game against the Denver Broncos, the Ravens were down 35–28 and had one last chance to tie the game. On 3rd down and 3 from the Ravens own 30-yard line, Jones caught a 70-yard touchdown pass from Joe Flacco with 31 seconds left. The play, dubbed the "Mile High Miracle", tied the game at 35 and preceded a 38–35 double overtime win for the Ravens.

External videos
- Jacoby Jones record SuperBowl kick-off return NFL YouTube video

In Super Bowl XLVII against the San Francisco 49ers, Jones became the first player to score a receiving touchdown and return touchdown in the same game in Super Bowl history. With under two minutes to play in the second quarter, Jones hauled in a 56-yard pass from Joe Flacco, eluding two defenders to score a touchdown. Jones then returned the opening kickoff of the second half for a 108-yard touchdown for the longest play in Super Bowl or postseason history. The Ravens won the game by a score of 34–31, earning Jones his first Super Bowl ring. Jones was then the feature player on the cover of the Super Bowl XLVII edition of Sports Illustrated.

During the 2013 regular season, Jones was injured in the Kickoff game in Week 1 when teammate Brynden Trawick ran into him during a punt return. Jones would not return until Week 6 against the Green Bay Packers, where he had his first receiving touchdown of the season. In Week 13, on Thanksgiving against the Pittsburgh Steelers, Jones returned a kickoff that would seemingly go for a touchdown, however Steelers head coach Mike Tomlin disrupted his route by "unknowingly" standing on the field while looking at the big screen in M&T Bank Stadium. The Ravens would later win by a score of 22–20. The next week, in a snowy game against the Minnesota Vikings, Jones returned a kickoff 77 yards for a touchdown in the final two minutes. The Vikings would then answer with another touchdown with 45 seconds remaining, until teammate, Marlon Brown, scored the game-winning touchdown with 4 seconds remaining, allowing the Ravens to win the game 29–26. In week 15, the Ravens played the Detroit Lions on Monday Night Football. On a crucial 3rd & 15 with two minutes left in regulation, Jones caught a pass from quarterback Joe Flacco that was good for the first down. Shortly after that, second year kicker Justin Tucker kicked a career-high and team record field goal from 61 yards for the 18–16 win. That record was later broken by Tucker in a game against the Detroit Lions in 2021. Jones had 6 receptions for 80 yards that game.

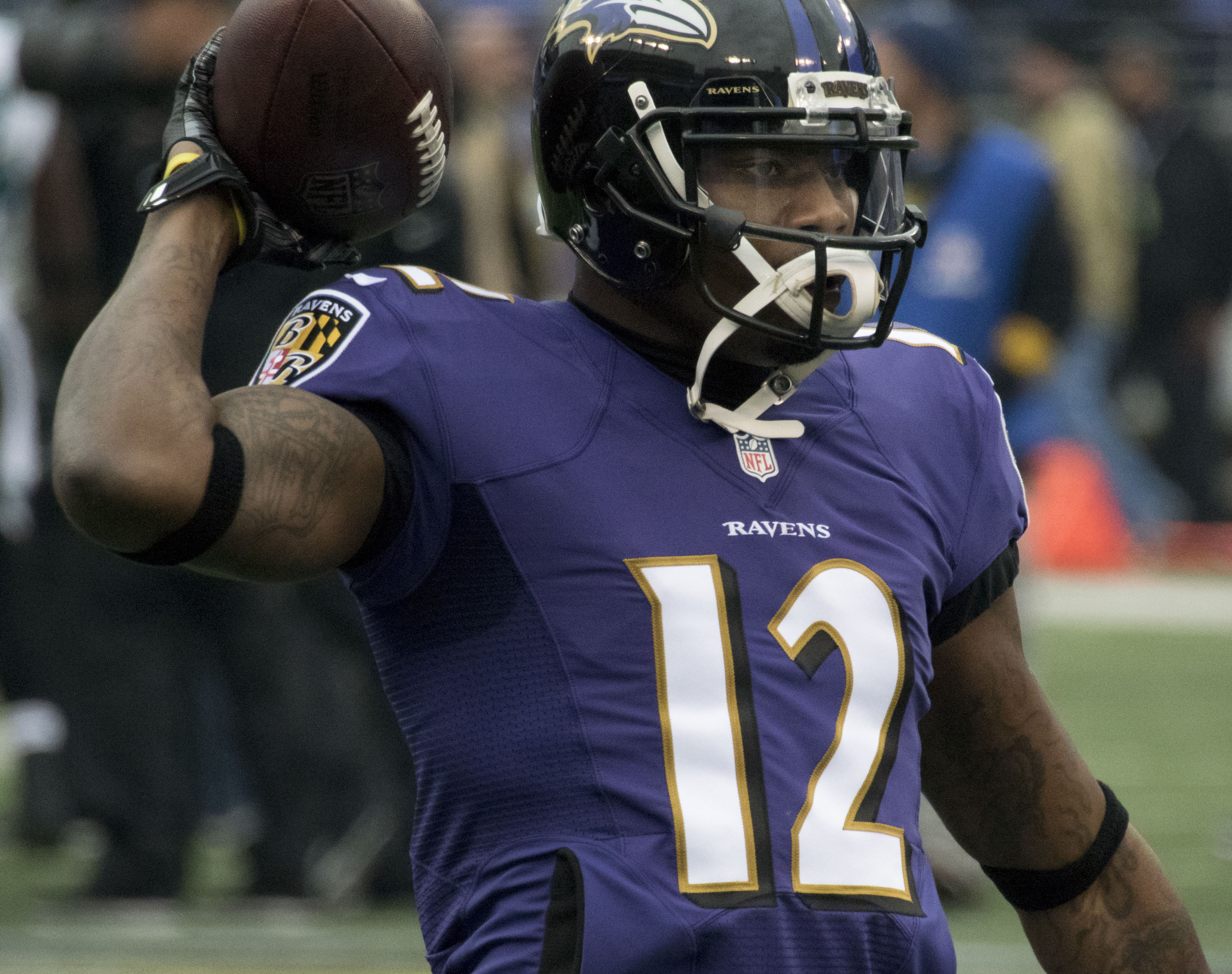
Jones in 2014.

After testing the free agent market, on March 12, 2014, Jones decided to remain with the Baltimore Ravens and agreed to a four-year, $12 million contract with $4.5 million guaranteed.

Jones saw diminished productivity for the 2014 season and was released from the Baltimore Ravens on February 25, 2015. He was due $2.5 million for the 2015 season.

=== San Diego Chargers ===
On March 6, 2015, Jones signed with the San Diego Chargers. The contract was for 2-years, $5.5 million with $1.6 million guaranteed and a $1.6 million signing bonus. He was released on November 3 after the Week 8 match-up against the Ravens.

=== Pittsburgh Steelers ===
Jones was claimed off waivers by the Pittsburgh Steelers on November 5, 2015. Jones wore number 13, since his normal number 12 was unofficially retired for Terry Bradshaw. After fumbling twice against the Indianapolis Colts, Jones was demoted to backup kick returner and third-string punt returner on the depth chart. He was released on January 1, 2016.

In four games with the Steelers, Jones had 6 punt returns for 19 yards and 9 kick returns for 220 yards.

=== Monterrey Steel ===
On March 13, 2017, Jones signed with the Monterrey Steel of the National Arena League (NAL). He played in 8 games for the Steel, catching 19 passes for 169 yards and 1 touchdown. He also returned 2 field goals for 71 yards and 1 touchdown while also returning 12 kicks for 223 yards.

=== Retirement ===
On September 29, 2017, Jones signed a one-day contract with the Ravens so he could retire as a member of the team.

== NFL career statistics ==
Legend
	Won the Super Bowl
	Led the league
**Bold**	Career high

Regular season

Year	Team	GP	Receiving						Punt return						Kick return						Fumbles	
Year	Team	GP	Rec	Yds	Avg	Lng	TD	FD	Ret	Yds	Avg	Lng	TD	FC	Ret	Yds	Avg	Lng	TD	FC	Fum	Lost
2007	HOU	14	15	149	9.9	26	0	9	30	286	9.5	74	0	7	4	78	19.5	23	0	0	2	**2**
2008	HOU	16	3	81	**27.0**	45	0	2	32	386	12.1	73	**2**	**17**	13	280	21.5	30	0	0	**4**	1
2009	HOU	14	27	437	16.2	45	**6**	19	39	426	10.9	62	0	14	24	638	26.6	95	1	0	2	0
2010	HOU	15	**51**	**562**	11.0	47	3	**31**	29	204	7.0	39	0	15	23	494	21.5	35	0	0	1	0
2011	HOU	16	31	512	16.5	**80**	2	23	**49**	**518**	10.6	**79**	1	7	0	0	0.0	0	0	0	0	0
2012	BAL	16	30	406	13.5	47	1	16	37	341	9.2	63	1	16	**38**	**1,167**	**30.7**	**108**	**2**	0	2	0
2013	BAL	12	37	455	12.3	66	2	21	19	237	**12.5**	37	0	2	31	892	28.8	77	1	0	0	0
2014	BAL	16	9	131	14.6	31	0	6	30	275	9.2	45	0	**17**	32	978	30.6	**108**	1	0	**4**	**2**
2015	SD	5	0	0	0.0	0	0	0	5	−4	-0.8	5	0	0	9	193	21.4	30	0	0	0	0
2015	PIT	4	0	0	0.0	0	0	0	6	19	3.2	14	0	0	9	220	24.4	36	0	0	3	1
Total		128	203	2,733	13.5	80	14	127	276	2,688	9.7	79	4	95	183	4,940	27.0	108	5	0	18	6

Playoffs

Year	Team	GP	Receiving					Punt return					Kick return					Fumbles	
Year	Team	GP	Rec	Yds	Avg	Lng	TD	Ret	Yds	Avg	Lng	TD	Ret	Yds	Avg	Lng	TD	Fum	Lost
2011	HOU	2	0	0	0.0	0	0	**9**	16	1.8	9	0	0	0	0.0	0	0	**2**	1
2012	BAL	4	**5**	**147**	**29.4**	**70**	**2**	8	**110**	**13.8**	**34**	0	**14**	**362**	**25.9**	**108**	**1**	1	0
2014	BAL	2	1	3	3.0	3	0	3	20	6.7	9	0	11	265	24.1	29	0	0	0
Total		8	6	150	25.0	70	2	20	146	7.3	34	0	25	627	25.1	108	1	3	0

== Awards and honors ==
=== NFL ===
- Super Bowl champion (XLVII)
- First-team All-Pro (2012)
- Pro Bowl (2012)
- AFC Special Teams Player of the Month – November 2012
- 5× AFC Special Teams Player of the Week – Week 6, 2008, Week 8, 2008, Week 4, 2009, Week 6, 2012, Week 10, 2012
- Ranked No. 88 in the Top 100 Players of 2013

=== College awards ===
- SIAC Most Valuable Player (2006)
- SIAC Offensive Player of the Year (2006)
- 4× All-SIAC (2003–2006)
- Lane College Athletics Hall of Fame (2016)
- SIAC Hall of Fame (2024)

== Records ==
=== NFL records ===
- Longest kickoff return in a Super Bowl (108)
- Longest play in a Super Bowl (108)
- Most all-purpose yards in a Super Bowl (288)
- Most career kick return TDs of 105+ yards (4)

=== Texans franchise records ===
- Most punt returns in a single season: 49 (2011)
- Most punt return yards in a single season: 518 (2011)
- Most punt return touchdowns in a single season: 2 (2008)
- Most career punt returns (179)
- Most career punt return touchdowns (3)
- Most career punt return yards (1,820)
- Most career all-purpose yards (5,091)

=== Ravens franchise records ===
- Most career kickoff return touchdowns (4)
- Most kickoff return touchdowns in a single season: 2 (2012)
- Longest kickoff return: 108 (vs Dallas Cowboys, vs Pittsburgh Steelers & vs San Francisco 49ers)

== Coaching career ==
Jones returned to his alma mater when he was named wide receivers coach with Lane College on January 16, 2018. After two seasons with the Dragons, he was back in Baltimore when Calvert Hall College High School appointed him to a similar capacity on October 6, 2020. Jones went on to coach the tight ends at Morgan State University. In 2022, Jones joined the coaching staff at Alabama State University.

== Dancing With the Stars ==
On February 24, 2013, Jones was the first star announced to be on Season 16 of Dancing With the Stars. He partnered with season 13 winner Karina Smirnoff. They reached the finals but came in third place.

Week #	Dance/Song	Judges' score			Result
Week #	Dance/Song	Inaba	Goodman	Tonioli	Result
1	Cha-Cha-Cha/"Good Feeling"	7	6	7	No Elimination
2	Jazz/"Five Guys Named Moe"	8	7	8	Safe
3	Prom Group Dance/"The Rockafeller Skank"; Rumba/"Stay"	Awarded; 8	2; 8	Points; 8	Safe
4	Foxtrot/"Watching You"	8	8	8	Safe
5	Jive/"Long Tall Sally"	9	8	9	Safe
6	Quickstep/"For Once in My Life"; Team Paso Doble/"Higher Ground"	8; 7	7; 8	8; 7	Safe
7	Salsa/"Danza Kuduro"	9	9	9	Safe
8	Viennese Waltz / "It's a Man's, Man's, Man's World"; Paso Doble (Trio Challenge) / "La Virgen de la Macarena"	9; 8	9; 9	9; 8	Last to be called safe
9 Semi-finals	Argentine Tango / "Concierto Para Quinteto"; Lindy Hop / "Ding Dong Daddy of the D-Car Line"	10; 10	10; 9	10; 10	Safe
10; Finals	Jive / "Shake It"; Cha-Cha-Cha Relay / "Treasure"; Freestyle / "Can't Hold Us"; Instant Salsa / 'Aguanile"	9 Awarded; 9; 10	9; 2; 9; 10	9 Points; 9; 10	Third Place

== Death ==
Jones died in his sleep at his home in New Orleans, Louisiana, on July 14, 2024. He was 40 years old. A medical examiner's office in Louisiana announced on August 6, 2024 that Jones died due to hypertensive cardiovascular disease from long-term hypertension.
