= 2017 Columbus Lions season =

- Owner: Rick Jacobson; Skip Seda; Duke Liberatore; Jan McBarron; Keith Norred; John Hargrove; Kike Seda
- Head coach: Jason Gibson
- Home stadium: Columbus Civic Center

Results
- Record: 9–3
- Conference place: 3rd
- Playoffs: Won NAL Semifinals 52–50 (Steelhawks); Lost NAL Championship 21–27 (Sharks)

The 2017 Columbus Lions season was the eleventh season for the professional indoor football franchise and first in the National Arena League (NAL). The Lions were one of eight teams that competed in the NAL for its inaugural 2017 season.

Led by head coach Jason Gibson, the Lions played their home games at the Columbus Civic Center.

== Standings ==
2017 National Arena League standings
	W	L	PCT	PF	PA	GB	STK
z – Jacksonville Sharks	11	1	.917	697	299	—	L1
y – Lehigh Valley Steelhawks	9	1	.900	610	349	1.0	W7
x – Columbus Lions	9	3	.750	689	412	2.0	W6
x – Monterrey Steel	7	4	.636	478	364	3.5	W1
High Country Grizzlies	3	7	.300	449	484	7.0	L4
Georgia Firebirds	2	9	.182	372	576	8.5	L5
Dayton Wolfpack	0	7	.000	125	478	8.5	L7
Corpus Christi Rage	0	9	.000	166	624	9.5	L9

z – clinched home field advantage

y – clinched home playoff game

x – clinched playoff spot

== Schedule ==
=== Regular season ===
The 2017 regular season schedule was released on December 9, 2016

Key: Win Tie Loss Bye

All start times are local time

Week	Day	Date	Kickoff	Opponent	Results		Location	Attendance
Week	Day	Date	Kickoff	Opponent	Score	Record	Location	Attendance
1	Friday	March 17	7:00pm	Jacksonville Sharks	L 41–56	0–1	Columbus Civic Center	2,456
2	Sunday	March 26	7:00pm	at Corpus Christi Rage	W 85–18	1–1	American Bank Center	536
3	Sunday	April 2	7:00pm	Georgia Firebirds	W 63–50	2–1	Columbus Civic Center	2,017
4	Sunday	April 9	7:00pm	at Lehigh Valley Steelhawks	L 54–60	2–2	PPL Center	
5	BYE							
6	Saturday	April 22	7:00pm	High Country Grizzlies	W 57–44	3–2	Columbus Civic Center	2,551
7	Saturday	April 29	7:00pm	at Jacksonville Sharks	L 28–37	3–3	Jacksonville Veterans Memorial Arena	7,103
8	Saturday	May 6	7:00pm	Monterrey Steel	W 48–18	4–3	Columbus Civic Center	2,425
9	BYE							
10	Saturday	May 20	7:00pm	Dayton Wolfpack	W 77–0	5–3	Columbus Civic Center	6,425
11	Saturday	May 27	7:00pm	at High Country Grizzlies	W 56–41	6–3	George M. Holmes Convocation Center	
12	Saturday	June 3	7:00pm	Corpus Christi Rage	W 81–12	7–3	Columbus Civic Center	2,735
13	Monday	June 12	7:00pm	at Monterrey Steel	W 49–42	8–3	Arena Monterrey	3,000
14	Saturday	June 17	7:00pm	at Georgia Firebirds	W 50–34	9–3	Albany Civic Center	

=== Post-season ===
Round	Day	Date	Kickoff	Opponent	Results		Location	Attendance
Round	Day	Date	Kickoff	Opponent	Score	Record	Location	Attendance
First Round	Friday	June 23	7:30pm	at Lehigh Valley Steelhawks	W 52–50	1–0	PPL Center	
Championship	Monday	July 10	7:00pm	at Jacksonville Sharks	L 21–27	1–1	Jacksonville Veterans Memorial Arena	

== Roster ==
2017 Columbus Lions roster
Quarterbacks: 1 Darren Daniel; 15 Mason Espinosa; Running backs: Currently vacant; Wide receivers: 6 Jarmon Forston; 5 Duron Neal; 8 Tristan Purifoy; 18 Michael Reeve	Offensive linemen: 75 David Griffin; 72 Ryne Holland; 66 Brandon Lathrop; 58 Dion Small; Defensive linemen: 95 Corey Crawford; 44 Logan Ingle; 13 Joe Marshall; 19 Toby Jackson; 11 Kendrick Washington; 55 Dalvon Stuckey	Linebackers: 24 Larry Edwards; 10 LeRon Furr; Defensive backs: 9 Kyle Griswould; 7 Chris Pickett; 12 Marte Sears; 3 Chris Smith; 21 Tyler Stephenson; Special teams: 14 Lindsey Wolfe	Reserve lists: -- Tovar Allen OL (IR); -- Kendrick Perry RB (DNR); 75 Brandon Thomas OL (IR); -- Gary Wilkins DL (Exempt); Rookies in italics Roster updated July 5, 2017; 24 Active, 4 Inactive
