= Sergio Schiaffino =

Mexican gridiron football player (born 1992)

No. 24 – Dinos de Saltillo
- Position: Defensive back

Personal information
- Born: 18 September 1992 (age 34); Monterrey, Nuevo León
- Listed height: 5 ft 9 in (1.75 m)
- Listed weight: 185 lb (84 kg)

Career information
- College: ITESM Monterrey
- CFL draft: 2019 LFA: 1st round, 8th overall pick

Career history
- Monterrey Steel (2017); Dinos de Saltillo (2018); Winnipeg Blue Bombers (2019)*; Dinos de Saltillo (2020); Winnipeg Blue Bombers (2021); Dinos de Saltillo (2022–present)
- * Offseason or practice squad member only

Awards and highlights
- 2× Grey Cup champion (2019, 2021); NAL Defensive Rookie of the Year (2017)
- Stats at CFL.ca

Sergio Schiaffino Pérez (born 18 September 1992) is a Mexican professional gridiron football defensive back for the Dinos de Saltillo of the Liga de Fútbol Americano Profesional (LFA).

== Early life ==
Schiaffino was born in Monterrey, Nuevo León on 18 September 1992. He started playing American football in 1998 in his hometown with Club Águilas and later joined Borregos Salvajes Monterrey youth teams until he was offered a scholarship to play college football with ITESM Monterrey.

== College career ==
Schiaffino played college football with the Borregos Salvajes Monterrey from 2012 to 2016 and majored in industrial engineering.

Schiaffino was part of the Mexican team that won the 2016 World University American Football Championship.

== Professional career ==
In 2017, Schiaffino was signed by the Monterrey Steel of the National Arena League. He was named the 2017 season Defensive Rookie of the Year.

Schiaffino was signed by the Dinos de Saltillo of the Liga de Fútbol Americano Profesional (LFA) ahead of the 2018 season.

In 2019, Schiaffino was drafted by the Winnipeg Blue Bombers in the 2019 CFL–LFA draft and made it to the practice roster. The 2020 CFL season was cancelled due to the COVID-19 pandemic.

In 2020, Schiaffino returned to the Dinos de Saltillo and played with the team for the 2020 season until it was cancelled due to COVID-19.

After two seasons in the practice squad, Schiaffino made his CFL debut with the Blue Bombers in September 2021, becoming the first Mexican defensive back to play in the CFL.

In 2022, Schiaffino returned to play with the Dinos de Saltillo.
