= 2017 High Country Grizzlies season =

- Owner: Don Thompson; Bryan Bouboulis
- Head coach: Josh Resignalo
- Home stadium: George M. Holmes Convocation Center

Results
- Record: 3–7
- Conference place: 5th
- Playoffs: Did not qualify

The 2017 High Country Grizzlies season was the franchise's inaugural season as a professional indoor football franchise; they are an expansion team of the National Arena League. The Grizzlies were one of eight teams that competed in the NAL for its inaugural 2017 season.

Led by head coach Josh Resignalo, the Grizzlies play their home games at the George M. Holmes Convocation Center on the campus of Appalachian State University.

== Standings ==
2017 National Arena League standings
	W	L	PCT	PF	PA	GB	STK
z – Jacksonville Sharks	11	1	.917	697	299	—	L1
y – Lehigh Valley Steelhawks	9	1	.900	610	349	1.0	W7
x – Columbus Lions	9	3	.750	689	412	2.0	W6
x – Monterrey Steel	7	4	.636	478	364	3.5	W1
High Country Grizzlies	3	7	.300	449	484	7.0	L4
Georgia Firebirds	2	9	.182	372	576	8.5	L5
Dayton Wolfpack	0	7	.000	125	478	8.5	L7
Corpus Christi Rage	0	9	.000	166	624	9.5	L9

z – clinched home field advantage

y – clinched home playoff game

x – clinched playoff spot

== Schedule ==
=== Regular season ===
The 2017 regular season schedule was released on December 9, 2016

Key: Win Tie Loss Bye

All start times are local time

Week	Day	Date	Kickoff	Opponent	Results		Location
Week	Day	Date	Kickoff	Opponent	Score	Record	Location
1	Saturday	March 18	7:00pm	at Georgia Firebirds	W 62–29	1–0	Albany Civic Center
2	Saturday	March 25	7:00pm	Lehigh Valley Steelhawks	L 42–48	1–1	George M. Holmes Convocation Center
3	Saturday	April 1	7:00pm	Dayton Wolfpack	W 94–6	2–1	George M. Holmes Convocation Center
4	Sunday	April 9	7:00pm	Jacksonville Sharks	L 21–68	2–2	George M. Holmes Convocation Center
5	BYE						
6	Saturday	April 22	7:00pm	at Columbus Lions	L 44–57	2–3	Columbus Civic Center
7	BYE						
8	Sunday	May 7	7:00pm	Georgia Firebirds	W 47–31	3–3	George M. Holmes Convocation Center
9	Monday	May 15	7:05pm	at Dayton Wolfpack	Cancelled (Note: Dayton Wolfpack folded due to not having a home arena; replaced by a travel only team based out of Atlanta)		
10	Saturday	May 20	7:00pm	Lehigh Valley Steelhawks	L 28–56	3–4	George M. Holmes Convocation Center
11	Saturday	May 27	7:00pm	Columbus Lions	L 41–56	3–5	George M. Holmes Convocation Center
12	Saturday	June 3	7:00pm	at Lehigh Valley Steelhawks	L 52–67	3–6	PPL Center
13	Saturday	June 10	7:00pm	at Jacksonville Sharks	L 18–66	3–7	Jacksonville Veterans Memorial Arena
14	Friday	June 16	7:00pm	at Corpus Christi Rage	Cancelled (Note: Game cancelled by the Rage as the team suspended operations the week prior.)		American Bank Center

== Roster ==
2017 High Country Grizzlies roster
Quarterbacks: 5 Reed Gurchiek; 12 Dennis Havrilla; Running backs: 6 Undra Hendrix; Wide receivers: 1 Daron Clark; 3 Alex Coleman; 18 Shamar Graves; 7 Malachi Jones	Offensive linemen: -- Jordan Farrow; -- Joe Hillin; -- Justin Wells; -- David Wilson; Defensive linemen: 17 Demarcus Berry; -- Brandon Davis; 96 Ethan Farmer; 92 Larry Ford; 44 Matthew Hardison; 90 Brandon Sutton	Linebackers: -- Kevin Cuffee; -- David Washington; Defensive backs: -- Sandy Chapman IV; 9 Tavian Lott; 2 Roshawn Marshall; 21 Cedeno Patrick; 8 Reggie Sullivan; -- Darion Thomas; Special teams: -- Will Johnson	Reserve lists: 99 Chase Blackburn DL (IR); 22 Brandon Fuentes DB (Susp.); 52 Trevon Goins OL (Susp.); 2 Dexter Jackson WR (Susp.); -- Michael Johnson LB (IR); 23 Darius Lipford LB (IR); 11 Stephen Panasuk QB (Susp.); 21 Troy Sanders DB (IR); 77 Tyrell Smith OL (IR); 83 Cody Sterrett WR (IR); 62 Ken Van Heule OL (IR); 10 Mackenzie Williams WR (IR); Rookies in italics Roster updated June 16, 2017; 26 Active, 12 Inactive
