= 2017 Lehigh Valley Steelhawks season =

- Owner: Glenn Clark
- Head coach: Chris Thompson
- Home stadium: PPL Center

Results
- Record: 9–1
- Conference place: 2nd
- Playoffs: Lost NAL Semifinals 50–52 (Lions)

The 2017 Lehigh Valley Steelhawks season was the seventh season for the professional indoor football franchise and first in the National Arena League (NAL). The Steelhawks were one of eight teams that competed in the NAL for its inaugural 2017 season

Led by head coach Chris Thompson, the Steelhawks played their home games at the PPL Center.

== Standings ==
2017 National Arena League standings
	W	L	PCT	PF	PA	GB	STK
z – Jacksonville Sharks	11	1	.917	697	299	—	L1
y – Lehigh Valley Steelhawks	9	1	.900	610	349	1.0	W7
x – Columbus Lions	9	3	.750	689	412	2.0	W6
x – Monterrey Steel	7	4	.636	478	364	3.5	W1
High Country Grizzlies	3	7	.300	449	484	7.0	L4
Georgia Firebirds	2	9	.182	372	576	8.5	L5
Dayton Wolfpack	0	7	.000	125	478	8.5	L7
Corpus Christi Rage	0	9	.000	166	624	9.5	L9

z – clinched home field advantage

y – clinched home playoff game

x – clinched playoff spot

== Schedule ==
=== Regular season ===
The 2017 regular season schedule was released on December 9, 2016

Key: Win Tie Loss Bye

All start times are local time

Week	Day	Date	Kickoff	Opponent	Results		Location
Week	Day	Date	Kickoff	Opponent	Score	Record	Location
1	Sunday	March 19	4:00pm	Dayton Wolfpack	W 66–25	1–0	PPL Center
2	Saturday	March 25	7:00pm	at High Country Grizzlies	W 48–42	2–0	George M. Holmes Convocation Center
3	Saturday	April 1	7:00pm	at Jacksonville Sharks	L 43–57	2–1	Jacksonville Veterans Memorial Arena
4	Sunday	April 9	7:00pm	Columbus Lions	W 60–54	3–1	PPL Center
5	Saturday	April 15	7:00pm	Georgia Firebirds	W 56–31	4–1	PPL Center
6	BYE						
7	Saturday	April 29	7:00pm	Corpus Christi Rage	W 95–28	5–1	PPL Center
8	Saturday	May 6	7:00pm	Dayton Wolfpack	W 68–6	6–1	PPL Center
9	BYE						
10	Saturday	May 20	7:00pm	at High Country Grizzlies	W 56–28	7–1	George M. Holmes Convocation Center
11	Monday	May 29	7:05pm	at Dayton Wolfpack	Cancelled (Note: Dayton Wolfpack folded due to not having a home arena; replaced by a travel only team based out of Atlanta)		
12	Saturday	June 3	7:00pm	High Country Grizzlies	W 67–52	8–1	PPL Center
13	Saturday	June 10	7:00pm	at Georgia Firebirds	W 51–26	9–1	Albany Civic Center
14	Monday	June 19	7:05pm	at Dayton Wolfpack	Cancelled		

=== Post-season ===
Round	Day	Date	Kickoff	Opponent	Results		Location
Round	Day	Date	Kickoff	Opponent	Score	Record	Location
First Round	Friday	June 23	7:30pm	Columbus Lions	L 50–52	0–1	PPL Center

== Roster ==
2017 Lehigh Valley Steelhawks roster
Quarterbacks: 8 Warren Smith; 6 Ray Wagner; Fullbacks: 22 Wyeaz Bradley; Wide receivers: 1 Brandon Renford; 3 Warren Oliver; 4 Darius Prince; 5 Matt Tralli	Offensive linemen: -- Orlando Colon; -- Andrew Edouard; 75 Curtis Nealer; 72 Bret Piekarski; Defensive linemen: 92 Joshua Bradley; 58 Thomas Dover; 33 Dante Holmes; 15 Tim Hume; 99 Shawn Lockett; 97 Edmon McClam	Linebackers: 12 Chris Alvarez; 54 Joe Koonce; Defensive backs: -- Derek Brim; 24 Rodney Hall Jr.; 21 Dom Joseph; 2 Eddy Umeh; Special teams: 10 Spencer Hotaling	Reserve lists: -- Eric Ducksworth DL (DNR); -- Dashawn Johnson OL (Exempt); 33 Rustin Mayorga FB (IR); -- Reggie McMillan DB (Susp.); -- Lenroy Neysmith (DNR); -- David Osei OL (Exempt); -- Jakeem Polk (DNR); 11 Franklin Williams WR (Susp.); 7 Jerrell Young WR (DNR); Rookies in italics Roster updated March 13, 2017; 24 Active, 9 Inactive
