= 2017 Georgia Firebirds season =

- Owner: Terence Fowler, Sr.
- Head coach: Antwone Savage
- Home stadium: Albany Civic Center

Results
- Record: 2–9
- Conference place: 6th
- Playoffs: Did not qualify

The 2017 Georgia Firebirds season was the second season for the professional indoor football franchise and first in the National Arena League (NAL). The Firebirds were one of eight teams that competed in the NAL for its inaugural 2017 season

Led by head coach Antwone Savage, the Firebirds played their home games at the Albany Civic Center. In May 2017, the league apparently took over operations of the Firebirds for the remainder of the season. As a result, the league cancelled the Firebirds' away game at the Corpus Christi Rage (another team the league was operating) as a cost-cutting measure.

== Standings ==
2017 National Arena League standings
	W	L	PCT	PF	PA	GB	STK
z – Jacksonville Sharks	11	1	.917	697	299	—	L1
y – Lehigh Valley Steelhawks	9	1	.900	610	349	1.0	W7
x – Columbus Lions	9	3	.750	689	412	2.0	W6
x – Monterrey Steel	7	4	.636	478	364	3.5	W1
High Country Grizzlies	3	7	.300	449	484	7.0	L4
Georgia Firebirds	2	9	.182	372	576	8.5	L5
Dayton Wolfpack	0	7	.000	125	478	8.5	L7
Corpus Christi Rage	0	9	.000	166	624	9.5	L9

z – clinched home field advantage

y – clinched home playoff game

x – clinched playoff spot

== Schedule ==
=== Regular season ===
The 2017 regular season schedule was released on December 9, 2016

Key: Win Tie Loss Bye

All start times are local time

Week	Day	Date	Kickoff	Opponent	Results		Location
Week	Day	Date	Kickoff	Opponent	Score	Record	Location
1	Saturday	March 18	7:00pm	High Country Grizzlies	L 29–62	0–1	Albany Civic Center
2	Saturday	March 25	7:00pm	at Jacksonville Sharks	L 26–55	0–2	Jacksonville Veterans Memorial Arena
3	Sunday	April 2	7:00pm	at Columbus Lions	L 50–63	0–3	Columbus Civic Center
4	Saturday	April 8	7:00pm	Corpus Christi Rage	W 76–26	1–3	Albany Civic Center
5	Saturday	April 15	7:00pm	at Lehigh Valley Steelhawks	L 31–56	1–4	PPL Center
6	BYE						
7	Saturday	April 29	7:00pm	Dayton Wolfpack	W 35–32	2–4	Albany Civic Center
8	Sunday	May 7	3:30pm	at High Country Grizzlies	L 31–47	2–5	George M. Holmes Convocation Center
9	BYE						
10	Saturday	May 20	7:00pm	at Corpus Christi Rage	Cancelled (Note: Game cancelled by the Firebirds due to not wanting to travel to Corpus Christi)		American Bank Center
11	Saturday	May 27	7:05pm	Monterrey Steel	L 26–68	2–6	Albany Civic Center
12	Monday	June 5	7:00pm	at Monterrey Steel	L 8–66	2–7	Arena Monterrey
13	Saturday	June 10	7:00pm	Lehigh Valley Steelhawks	L 26–51	2–8	Albany Civic Center
14	Saturday	June 17	7:00pm	Columbus Lions	L 34–50	2–9	Albany Civic Center

== Roster ==
2017 Georgia Firebirds roster
Quarterbacks: 10 Gregory Hankerson; Fullbacks: 22 Zach Brown; Wide receivers: 2 Antonio Bearden; 8 Byron Dickerson; 1 Terrence Ebagua; 21 Brian Foy Jr.; 4 John Harris; 9 Jason Johnson; 3 Isaiah Jupiter; 5 Jamill Smith	Offensive linemen: 69 Bradley Clapsaddle; 52 Dana Harris; -- Robert Singleton; Defensive linemen: 90 Charles Henderson; 12 Joshua Bradley; 99 Devonte McClain; 37 Howard Stephens; 33 Derrick Wimbush	Linebackers: 31 Emmanuel Henry-Ajudua; Defensive backs: -- Michael Duckworth; 6 Cole Furgason; -- Kent London; 7 Rodonterio Blackledge; 23 Morris Mitchell; Special teams: 17 Jed Solomon	Reserve lists: 23 Dominique Burks DB (IR); -- Jerome Cook OL (Susp.); 52 Joshua Davis OL (Susp.); -- Jamarkus Gaskins LB (IR); -- JaJuan Harley DB (Susp.); 44 Lavar Ledbetter LB (IR); -- Joshua McIntosh K (IR); 3 Sean Potts-Harris DB (Susp.); -- Cory Rue LB (DNR); 70 D'Andre Williams OL (IR); Rookies in italics Roster updated June 17, 2017; 25 Active, 10 Inactive
