= Monterrey Steel =

Professional indoor football team

Logo

General information
- Founded: 2016
- Folded: 2017
- Headquartered: Monterrey, Nuevo León at Arena Monterrey
- Colors: Black, gold, white
- MonterreySteel.com

Personnel
- Owner: Fernando Von Rossum
- Head coach: J. A. Anderson
- President: Fernando Von Rossum

Team history
- Monterrey Steel (2017)

Home fields
- Arena Monterrey (2017)

League / conference affiliations
- National Arena League (2017)

Playoff appearances (1)
- 2017

The Monterrey Steel was a professional indoor football team and a charter member of the National Arena League (NAL) that played in the 2017 season. Based in Monterrey, Nuevo Leon, the Steel played their home games at Arena Monterrey.

The Steel were the first team from Mexico to play in an American arena/indoor football league, as well as the first team from outside the United States to play in one since the Toronto Phantoms of the Arena Football League (2001–2002).

== History ==
On November 30, 2016, it was announced that the Monterrey Steel would be joining the National Arena League for its inaugural 2017 season. In the announcement, the team named arena football veteran J. A. Anderson as their first head coach, and unveiled their logo and color scheme. The Steel nickname is a tribute to Monterrey being the steel capital of Mexico, with the first mills opening in the city in 1903, and owner Fernando Von Rossum's association with the Pittsburgh Steelers.

The Steel were the only team in the 2017 season to defeat the Jacksonville Sharks in the last week of the regular season at Jacksonville. They again faced the Sharks in Jacksonville one week later in a semifinal playoff game, where they lost 43–32.

During the 2017 off-season, the Steel were unable to commit for playing the 2018 season in the NAL citing the 2017 Central Mexico earthquake. By November 2017, the team website had expired. The team would eventually be removed from the league in December for failing to meet the league's minimum obligations in time for the release of the 2018 schedule.

In January 2018, the Southern Steam of the semi-professional Elite Indoor Football announced they would play the Steel on July 1, 2018, in an international game (along with Lagartos Tamaulipas) but has not been mentioned since.

=== Monterrey Kings ===
In 2024, owner Fernando Von Rossum was announced as the owner of the Monterrey Kings, a team that was originally slated to begin play in Arena Football One. In a social media post, the Kings advertised themselves as a revival of the Steel. In November 2024, the Kings postponed their AF1 debut until 2026. The Kings have not posted on social media since January 2025.

== Season result ==
Season	League	Regular season				Postseason results
Season	League	Finish	Wins	Losses	Ties	Postseason results
2017	NAL	4th	7	4	0	Lost Semifinal 32–43 vs. Jacksonville

== Players ==
=== Roster ===
Monterrey Steel roster
Quarterbacks: 8 Robert Kent; 1 Bernard Morris; Running backs: 55 Charles Stevens; Wide receivers: 2 London Crawford; 14 Dello Davis; 3 Jeron Harvey; 7 David Lewis; 15 Derek Patterson	Offensive linemen: 58 René Brassea; 74 Colin Madison; 69 Derrick Zeigler; Defensive linemen: 47 Jabari Fletcher; 96 Federico Orturo; 13 Joe Sykes; 18 Jerry Turner; 10 Jeremiah Zene Jr.	Linebackers: 11 Nathaniel Dunn; 17 Wesley Mauia; Defensive backs: 5 Justin Broome; 4 Svante Davenport; 20 Travonti Johnson; 14 Sergio Schiaffino; 21 Greg Reid; Special teams: 6 Brandon Rutherford	Reserve lists: 12 Jacoby Jones WR (IR); 23 Jonathan Lugo FB (IR); -- Charles McClain WR (Exempt); 9 Darwin Pittman LB (IR); -- Eric Weaver OL (IR); Rookies in italics; Roster updated June 24, 2017; 24 Active, 5 Inactive

=== Individual awards ===
Defensive Rookie of the Year
Season	Player	Position
2017	Sergio Schiaffino	DB

== Staff ==
Monterrey Steel staff
Front office: Owner – Fernando Von Rossum	Head coach: Head coach – J. A. Anderson

== 2017 season ==
2017 Monterrey Steel season
- Owner: Leoncio Ruiz
- Head coach: J. A. Anderson
- Home stadium: Arena Monterrey

Results
- Record: 7–4
- Conference place: 4th
- Playoffs: Lost NAL Semifinals 32–43 (Sharks)

=== Standings ===
2017 National Arena League standings
	W	L	PCT	PF	PA	GB	STK
z – Jacksonville Sharks	11	1	.917	697	299	—	L1
y – Lehigh Valley Steelhawks	9	1	.900	610	349	1.0	W7
x – Columbus Lions	9	3	.750	689	412	2.0	W6
x – Monterrey Steel	7	4	.636	478	364	3.5	W1
High Country Grizzlies	3	7	.300	449	484	7.0	L4
Georgia Firebirds	2	9	.182	372	576	8.5	L5
Dayton Wolfpack	0	7	.000	125	478	8.5	L7
Corpus Christi Rage	0	9	.000	166	624	9.5	L9

z – clinched home field advantage

y – clinched home playoff game

x – clinched playoff spot

=== Schedule ===
==== Regular season ====
The 2017 regular season schedule was released on December 9, 2016.

Key: Win Tie Loss Bye

All start times are local time

Week	Day	Date	Kickoff	Opponent	Results		Location
Week	Day	Date	Kickoff	Opponent	Score	Record	Location
1	Monday	March 20	7:00pm	Corpus Christi Rage	W 55–12	1–0	Arena Monterrey
2	Monday	March 27	7:00pm	Dayton Wolfpack	W 61–24	2–0	Arena Monterrey
3	Monday	April 3	7:00pm	Corpus Christi Rage	W 57–28	3–0	Arena Monterrey
4	Monday	April 10	7:05pm	at Dayton Wolfpack	Cancelled (Note: Dayton Wolfpack folded due to not having a home arena; replaced by a travel only team based out of Atlanta)		
5	BYE						
6	Monday	April 24	7:00pm	Jacksonville Sharks	L 21–60	3–1	Arena Monterrey
7	BYE						
8	Saturday	May 6	7:00pm	at Columbus Lions	L18–48	3–2	Columbus Civic Center
9	Monday	May 15	7:00pm	at Corpus Christi Rage	W 33–30	4–2	American Bank Center
10	Saturday	May 20	7:00pm	at Jacksonville Sharks	L 13–42	4–3	Jacksonville Veterans Memorial Arena
11	Saturday	May 27	7:00pm	at Georgia Firebirds	W 68–26	5–3	Albany Civic Center
12	Monday	June 5	7:00pm	Georgia Firebirds	W 66–8	6–3	Arena Monterrey
13	Monday	June 12	7:00pm	Columbus Lions	L 42–49	6–4	Arena Monterrey
14	Saturday	June 17	7:00pm	at Jacksonville Sharks	W 44–37	7–4	Jacksonville Veterans Memorial Arena

==== Postseason ====
Round	Day	Date	Kickoff	Opponent	Results		Location
Round	Day	Date	Kickoff	Opponent	Score	Record	Location
First Round	Saturday	June 24	7:00pm	at Jacksonville Sharks	L 32–43	0–1	Jacksonville Veterans Memorial Arena
