= A. J. Harmon =

American football player (born 1989)

No. 98, 75
- Position: Offensive tackle

Personal information
- Born: January 5, 1989 (age 37); Wadley, Georgia, U.S.
- Listed height: 6 ft 5 in (1.96 m)
- Listed weight: 320 lb (145 kg)

Career information
- High school: Jefferson County (Louisville, Georgia)
- College: Cumberland
- NFL draft: 2014: undrafted

Career history
- Tampa Bay Storm (2015)*; Cedar Rapids Titans (2015–2016); Jacksonville Sharks (2017); Atlanta Havoc (2018); Columbus Lions (2019–?)
- * Offseason or practice squad member only

Awards and highlights
- NAL champion (2017); Second-team AFCA-NAIA Coaches’ All-America honors; U.S. Army All-American Bowl (2008); Second-team All-IFL (2016); First-team All-NAL (2017)
- Stats at ArenaFan.com

A. J. Harmon (born January 5, 1989) is an American former professional football offensive tackle. Harmon also played in the National Football League for the Kansas City Chiefs and the Seattle Seahawks in 2014. Harmon also played for the Tampa Bay Storm in 2014 as well. He played college football for the Georgia Bulldogs for two seasons, another season with the Alabama State Hornets before transferring to the Cumberland Phoenix. Harmon is a member of Omega Psi Phi fraternity.

On February 6, 2017, Harmon signed with the Jacksonville Sharks. He signed with the Atlanta Havoc for the 2018 season.

College recruiting
Name	Hometown	School	Height	Weight	40^{‡}	Commit date
A. J. Harmon; OG	Louisville, Georgia	Jefferson County High School (Georgia)	6 ft 4 in (1.93 m)	308 lb (140 kg)	N/A	Jan 1, 2008
A. J. Harmon; OG	Recruit ratings: Scout: Rivals:					
Overall recruit ranking:
Note: In many cases, Scout, Rivals, 247Sports, On3, and ESPN may conflict in their listings of height and weight.; In these cases, the average was taken. ESPN grades are on a 100-point scale.; Sources:
