= Charles Hunt (American football) =

American football player (born 1983)

Charles Hunt, Jr.
No. 4, 11
- Position: Wide receiver / Linebacker

Personal information
- Born: March 12, 1983 (age 43); Jacksonville, Florida, U.S.
- Listed height: 6 ft 4 in (1.93 m)
- Listed weight: 225 lb (102 kg)

Career information
- High school: Episcopal School of Jacksonville (FL)
- College: Florida State
- NFL draft: 2009: undrafted

Career history

Playing
- Utah Saints (2009); Wyoming Cavalry (2010); Jacksonville Sharks (2011–2012); Orlando Predators (2013); Jacksonville Sharks (2014, 2017)

Coaching
- Jacksonville Sharks (2018–2024) Various coaching roles

Awards and highlights
- ArenaBowl champion (2011); NAL champion (2017); First Team All-NAL (2017); NAL Defensive Player of the Year (2017)

Career AFL statistics
- Tackles: 115
- Sacks: 1.5
- Forced fumbles: 3
- Fumble recoveries: 5
- Pass breakups: 18
- Stats at ArenaFan.com

Charles Hunt, Jr. (born March 12, 1983) is an American former football linebacker. He played as a linebacker for Florida State University. He was signed as a free agent by the Jacksonville Sharks in 2010.

Hunt was a coach with the Sharks from 2018 to 2024.

== Personal ==
Charles's father, Charles Hunt, Sr., played at Florida State University and in the NFL for the San Francisco 49ers and the Tampa Bay Buccaneers. Charles Jr. played at Episcopal High School in Jacksonville, Florida, where Charles Sr. is currently a coach.
