= The Ruse =

US musical group

- Origin: Los Angeles, US
- Genre: Indie rock
- Years active: 2004–present
- Label: KEV Records, France
- Members: Jim Bilus; Jason Young; John Dauer; Mark Stolze
- Website: www.rusemusic.com

The Ruse is a four-piece indie rock band based in Los Angeles, California. The band was started in 2004 in New York City, but relocated in 2005 to California. The band is known for grand, epic sounding songs and a captivating live show.

The band started playing coast-to-coast tours in 2005, and has since performed hundreds of shows throughout the United States. The band has released four full-length studio albums, and one EP. In 2007, the band was featured on the "Young Hollywood" episode of The Hills (TV series).

In June 2009, iTunes selected The Ruse song "Beautiful Is Gone" to be the iTunes Single of the Week. The group's album Midnight in the City reached No. 21 on the Billboard Heatseekers chart as a result.

In 2012, the band travelled to France to promote their Rebellion EP.

In October 2013, Muse took The Ruse to Mexico as their support band for six shows. In September 2015, The Ruse were the opening band for Muse concerts in Bangkok, Singapore, Hong Kong and South Korea.

== Members ==
- John Dauer – vocals
- Jim Bilus – guitar
- Mark Stolze – bass
- Jason Young – drums

== Discography ==
- Invasion (2005)
- Light in Motion (2006)
- Live at the Viper Room (2007)
- Midnight in the City (2008)
- Love Sex Confusion (2010)
- Rebellion (2011)
- Soltrenz SoundStage – The Ruse (remix EP) (2011)
- Interstellar Stowaway (2015)
