= 2017 National Arena League season =

2017 NAL season
- League: National Arena League
- Sport: Indoor American football
- Duration: March 17, 2017 – July 8, 2017

Regular season
- Season champions: Jacksonville Sharks
- Season MVP: Warren Smith (Lehigh Valley Steelhawks)

Playoffs
- 1 vs. 4 champions: Jacksonville Sharks
- 1 vs. 4 runners-up: Monterrey Steel
- 2 vs. 3 champions: Columbus Lions
- 2 vs. 3 runners-up: Lehigh Valley Steelhawks

2017 NAL Championship
- Champions: Jacksonville Sharks
- Runners-up: Columbus Lions
- Finals MVP: Jeremiah Price

NAL seasons
- 2018 →

The 2017 National Arena League season was the inaugural season of the National Arena League (NAL). Playing with eight teams spread across the eastern and southern United States (with one team in Mexico), the league's regular season kicked off on March 17, 2017, when the Columbus Lions hosted the Jacksonville Sharks and lost 41–56. The regular season ended 14 weeks later on June 17, 2017, with the Sharks hosting the Monterrey Steel and the Lions visiting the Georgia Firebirds. The playoffs were held in two rounds, with the top seed hosting the fourth seed and the second seed hosting the third seed, with the winners of these games facing in the 2017 NAL Championship hosted by the highest remaining seed.

== Teams ==
For 2017, the NAL consisted of eight teams in a single-table format (no divisions or conferences). Four of the teams (Corpus Christi Rage, Dayton Wolfpack, High Country Grizzlies and Monterrey Steel) were playing their inaugural seasons, with three teams (Columbus Lions, Georgia Firebirds, Lehigh Valley Steelhawks) joining from the now-defunct American Indoor Football, and one team (Jacksonville Sharks) joining from the Arena Football League.

Each team was scheduled for 12 games (6 home and 6 away) with 2 bye weeks during the season. However, in order to satisfy their arena contract from their time in AFL, the Jacksonville Sharks were given eight home games, while the Corpus Christi Rage and Dayton Wolfpack were each only given five home games to balance the schedules. This was changed again when the Wolfpack were apparently unable to secure an arena lease, despite announcing they would play at the Nutter Center. Previously signed players reported on social media before the season that all players had been cut from the team, and as of February 20, all their home games were canceled.

=== Other cancelled games ===
- The May 20 Firebirds vs. Rage matchup was cancelled by the league, which took ownership of both teams at the time, as they saw no reason to pay for the Firebirds' travel cost for a game between both of their teams.
- The June 16 Grizzles vs. Rage matchup was cancelled by the Rage as a result of the team suspending operations during their scheduled bye week.

=== Teams ===
Team	Location	Arena	Capacity	Founded	Joined	Head coach
Columbus Lions	Columbus, Georgia	Columbus Civic Center	7,573	2006	2017	Jason Gibson
Corpus Christi Rage	Corpus Christi, Texas	American Bank Center	10,000	2016	2017	Steven Fillmore
Dayton Wolfpack	Dayton, Ohio	Traveling team (based in Georgia)		2016	2017	Multiple
Georgia Firebirds	Albany, Georgia	Albany Civic Center	8,436	2009	2017	Antwone Savage
High Country Grizzlies	Boone, North Carolina	George M. Holmes Convocation Center	8,325	2016	2017	Josh Resignalo
Jacksonville Sharks	Jacksonville, Florida	Jacksonville Veterans Memorial Arena	13,011	2009	2017	Mark Stoute; Siaha Burley
Lehigh Valley Steelhawks	Allentown, Pennsylvania	PPL Center	8,500	2010	2017	Chris Thompson
Monterrey Steel	Monterrey, Nuevo León	Arena Monterrey	17,599	2016	2017	JA Anderson

== Standings ==
2017 National Arena League standings
	W	L	PCT	PF	PA	GB	STK
z – Jacksonville Sharks	11	1	.917	697	299	—	L1
y – Lehigh Valley Steelhawks	9	1	.900	610	349	1.0	W7
x – Columbus Lions	9	3	.750	689	412	2.0	W6
x – Monterrey Steel	7	4	.636	478	364	3.5	W1
High Country Grizzlies	3	7	.300	449	484	7.0	L4
Georgia Firebirds	2	9	.182	372	576	8.5	L5
Dayton Wolfpack	0	7	.000	125	478	8.5	L7
Corpus Christi Rage	0	9	.000	166	624	9.5	L9

z – clinched home field advantage

y – clinched home playoff game

x – clinched playoff spot

== Playoffs ==
Semifinal
1	Jacksonville	43
4	Monterrey	32
2	Lehigh Valley	50
3	Columbus	52

2017 NAL Championship
1	Jacksonville	27
3	Columbus	21

== Awards ==
=== Individual season awards ===
Award	Winner	Position	Team
Most Valuable Player	Warren Smith	Quarterback	Lehigh Valley Steelhawks
Offensive Player of the Year	Michael Reeve	Wide receiver	Columbus Lions
Defensive Player of the Year	Charlie Hunt	Linebacker	Jacksonville Sharks
Special Teams Player of the Year	Nick Belcher	Kicker	Jacksonville Sharks
Offensive Rookie of the Year	Malachi Jones	Wide receiver	High Country Grizzlies
Defensive Rookie of the Year	Sergio Schiaffino	Defensive back	Monterrey Steel
Most Improved Award	Warren Oliver	Wide receiver	Lehigh Valley Steelhawks
Coach of the Year			

=== 1st Team All-NAL ===
Offense
Quarterback	Warren Smith, Lehigh Valley
Running back	Derrick Ross, Jacksonville
Wide receiver	Michael Reeve, Columbus; Darius Prince, Lehigh Valley; London Crawford, Monterrey
Offensive tackle	Cornelius Lewis, Jacksonville; Moqut Ruffins, Jacksonville
Center	A. J. Harmon, Jacksonville

Defense
Defensive line	Joe Sykes, Monterrey; Jabari Fletcher, Monterrey; Jeremiah Price, Jacksonville
Linebacker	Wesley Mauia, Monterrey; Charlie Hunt, Jacksonville
Defensive back	Erick McIntosh, Jacksonville; Kyle Griswould, Columbus; Marvin Ross, Jacksonville

Special teams
Kicker	Nick Belcher, Jacksonville
Kick returner	Brandon Renford, Lehigh Valley

=== 2nd Team All-NAL ===
Offense
Quarterback	Mason Espinosa, Columbus
Running back	Undra Hendrix, High Country
Wide receiver	Brandon Renford, Lehigh Valley; Moe Williams, Jacksonville; Tristan Purifoy, Columbus
Offensive tackle	Bret Piekarski, Lehigh Valley; Colin Madison, Monterrey
Center	Ryne Holland, Columbus

Defense
Defensive line	Brandon Sutton, High Country; Larry Ford, High Country; Daylou Pierson, Jacksonville
Linebacker	Larry Edwards, Columbus; Marte Sears, Columbus
Defensive back	Rodney Hall Jr., Lehigh Valley; Micheaux Robinson, Jacksonville; Svante Davenport, Monterrey

Special teams
Kicker	Brandon Rutherford, Monterrey
Kick returner	Daron Clark, High Country

== See also ==
- 2017 Indoor Football League season
