= High Country Grizzlies =

Former professional indoor American football team

Logo

General information
- Founded: 2016
- Folded: 2019
- Headquartered: Boone, North Carolina at the George M. Holmes Convocation Center
- Colors: Black, orange, silver, white
- Mascot: Grizzy
- HighCountryGrizzlies.com

Personnel
- Owners: Paul & Christine Potter; Don Thompson; Bryan Bouboulis
- General manager: William Thompson

Nickname
- Grizzlies

Team history
- High Country Grizzlies (2017–2018)

Home fields
- George M. Holmes Convocation Center (2017–2018)

League / conference affiliations
- National Arena League (2017); American Arena League (2018)

The High Country Grizzlies were a professional indoor football team that began play in the 2017 season. Based in Boone, North Carolina, the Grizzlies played their home games at the George M. Holmes Convocation Center on the campus of Appalachian State University.

== History ==
On April 14, 2016, American Indoor Football (AIF) announced that it had granted an expansion franchise to the High Country region for the 2017 season. At an introductory press conference on July 14, the Grizzlies officially introduced themselves, their staff, head coach, name, logo, colors and venue. However, on July 18, the AIF ceased operations forcing the Grizzlies to find a new league. On July 21, the team announced it had joined the Arena Developmental League for the new league's inaugural season. In November 2016, the ADL then changed its name to National Arena League.

Prior to the 2017 season, the Grizzlies had recruited former Appalachian State and NFL wide receiver Dexter Jackson to be the marquee player and face of the team for marketing and ticket sales, agreeing to sales incentives and relocation reimbursement for Jackson and his family. Jackson initially requested his ticket sales incentives in February prior to the start of the season, but Jackson would leave the team over non-payment in May and the league suspended Jackson. In August, Jackson took the Grizzlies to arbitration with the league and the NAL ruled in Jackson's favor with the team owing Jackson US$9,500. Jackson filed another complaint with Watauga County over continued non-payment by the team as of January 2018.

After one season in the NAL, the Grizzlies announced on September 20 that the organization had joined the newly formed American Arena League (AAL) for the 2018 season. Scoot Meserve was hired as head coach and the team finished the season with a 2–6 record, failing to make the AAL playoffs.

Prior to the 2019 season, the Grizzlies hired Jeff Hunt as head coach, but the team ceased operations in February 2019 a month before the season was to begin.

== Players and staff ==
=== Individual awards ===
Offensive Rookie of the Year
Season	Player	Position
2017	Malachi Jones	WR

== Statistics and records ==
=== Season-by-season results ===
League champions	Conference champions	Division champions	Playoff berth	League leader

Season	Team	League	Regular season				Postseason results
Season	Team	League	Finish	Wins	Losses	Ties	Postseason results
2017	2017	NAL	5th	3	7	0	
2018	2018	AAL	8th	2	6	0	
Totals				5	13	0	All-time regular season record (2017–2018)
Totals				0	0	—	All-time postseason record (2017–2018)
Totals				5	13	0	All-time regular season and postseason record (2017–2018)

=== Head coaches' records ===
Name	Term	Regular season				Playoffs		Awards
Name	Term	W	L	T	Win%	W	L	Awards
Josh Resignalo	2017	3	7	0	.300	—	—	
Scott Meserve	2018	2	6	0	.250	—	—	
