= Arena Monterrey =

Indoor arena in Monterrey, Nuevo León

- La Arena

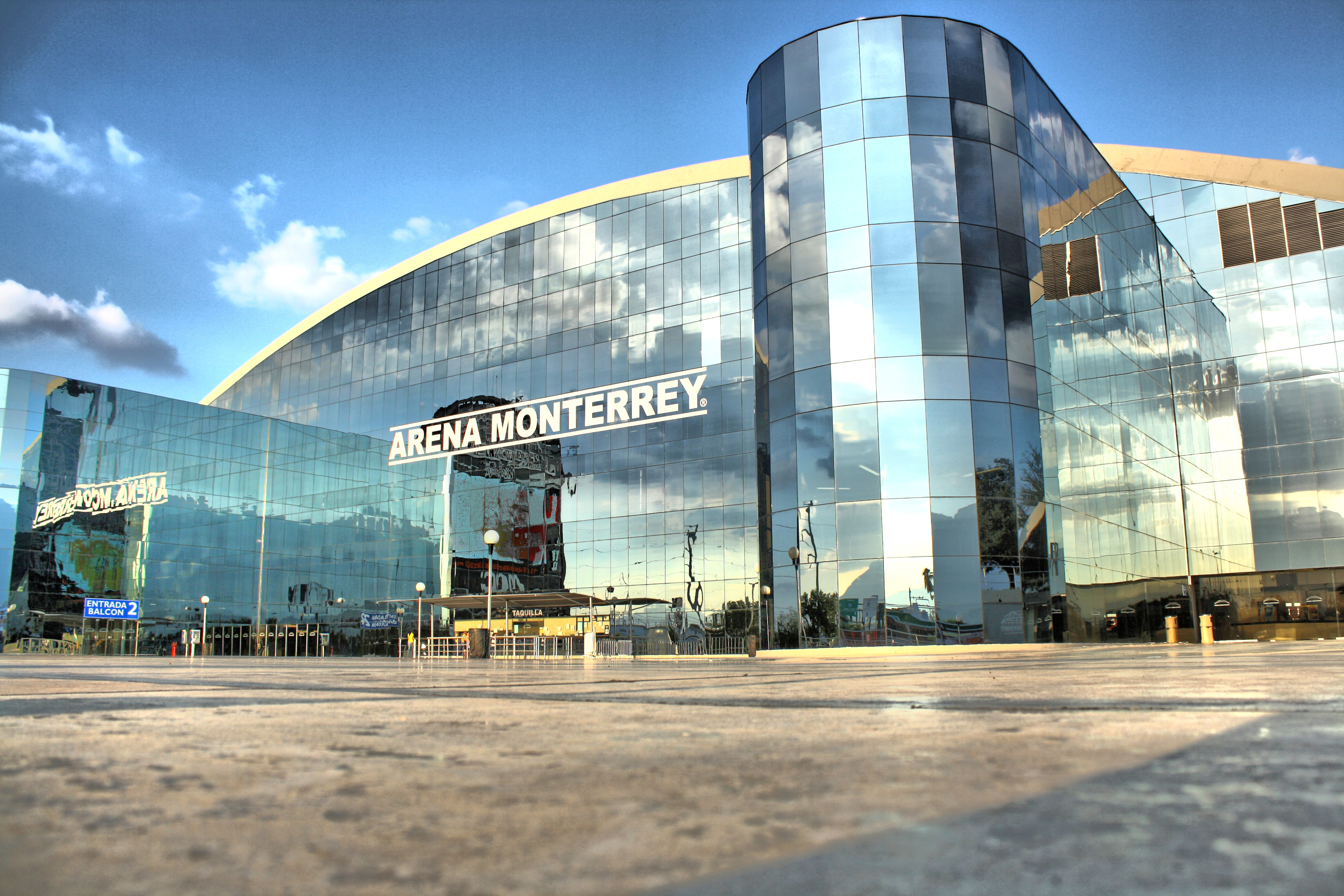

- Location within Mexico
- Address: Avenida Francisco I. Madero 2500, Centro
- Location: Monterrey, Nuevo León, Mexico
- Coordinates: 25°40′51.03″N 100°17′17.64″W
- Owner: Publimax México and TV Azteca
- Operator: Zignia Live
- Capacity: 17,599
- Public transit: Arena Monterrey metro station

Construction
- Groundbreaking: January 1994
- Opened: November 27, 2003
- Cost: US$$55 million
- Main contractor: Maiz Mier Group

Tenants
- Fuerza Regia (LNBP) (2003–2008); Monterrey La Raza (MISL/NISL) (2007–2010); Monterrey Fury (MISL) (2003–2005); Monterrey Flash (MASL) (2013–2015, 2017–present); Monterrey Steel (NAL) (2017); Monterrey Kings (AF1) (2026–present)

Website
- arenamonterrey.com

Arena Monterrey is an indoor arena in Monterrey, Nuevo León. It is primarily used for shows, concerts and indoor sports like indoor soccer, arena football and basketball. It used to be the home arena of the Monterrey Fury indoor soccer team and the Fuerza Regia, a professional basketball team in the Liga Nacional de Baloncesto Profesional; the Monterrey La Raza, a team in the NISL; and the Monterrey Steel, an indoor American football team in the National Arena League.

The Arena Monterrey is owned by Publimax S.A. de C.V. (TV Azteca Northeast), part of the Avalanz Group, who owns 80% and by TV Azteca who owns 20%. The arena is 45,000 m^{2} (480,000 square feet) in size.

== History ==
The project of the arena started in 1989 when the Asociación para el Fomento de Deporte y Recreación A.C, led by the businessmen Jorge Lankenau and Hernan Garza presented the project to the then president Carlos Salinas. The project gained support from the Government of the State of Nuevo León who gave the land for the arena to be constructed within the limits of Fundidora Park.

The arena was originally planned to begin construction in May 1992, and finished by 1993, but the construction actually started in January 1994, and was planned to be finished by 1996. However, due to the 1994 economic crisis in Mexico, in May 1995 the project suffered a slowdown in the construction industry and finally came to a complete halt by 1996, due to the lack of economic resources.

In April 2001, the Government of the State of Nuevo León invited 11 groups of investors to discuss the possibilities of restarting the construction of the arena. On June 1, 2001, the government announced that there were only five groups of investors willing to take over the debt and finish up the project and 2 weeks later, Publimax S.A. de C.V. was announced winner of the contest because it was the group with the most money eager to invest in the project (US$50 million). Before the construction was restarted, Hernán Garza accused the government of illegally revoking the concession that was given to him to build and finish the project. The government revoked the concession because of the halt of the project in 1995, but Garza alleged that the economic crisis obliged him to stop it for some time. This, among other problems such as the government delay in giving full control of the arena and Publimax rejecting any investment until control was fully given (which happened in July 2002), caused the project to restart by the end of 2002 with an estimated finish date by the first trimester of 2004.

However, by the last trimester of 2003, the project was almost completed and the first event in the arena took place on Thursday November 27, 2003, with a concert performed by Mexican singer-songwriter Juan Gabriel.

== Events ==
=== International summits ===
- Press Center for the Monterrey Special Summit of the Americas – January 2004

=== Sports events ===
- First WNBA game outside the United States: Detroit Shock vs San Antonio Silver Stars – May 2004
- Pre-season NBA Games: Denver Nuggets vs Golden State Warriors – October 2006 and Philadelphia 76ers vs Phoenix Suns – October 2009.
- In 2004, World Wrestling Entertainment (WWE) made its debut in Mexico with WWE RAW: Wrestlemania XX Revenge Tour in Monterrey.
- The first WWE Raw house show took place on April 3, 2004; after the huge success by the Mexican fans, Raw returned on November of that same year. The SmackDown brand debuted in January 2006 with a sellout.
- In October 2008, SmackDown made its return, and ECW its Arena Monterrey debut, with the Survivor Series Live Tour with two dates; October 16 and 17.
- Total Nonstop Action Wrestling (TNA) also had a house show in November 2006. In December 2007 TNA was supposed to have another house show in Arena Monterrey, but for some reason it was cancelled.
- Lucha Libre AAA World Wide (AAA) held the Héroes Inmortales III event on September 26, 2009, the Héroes Inmortales pay-per-view on October 9, 2011, and as part of the WWE, Noche de Los Grandes on May 30, 2026, featuring the critically acclaimed Lucha de Apuestas Máscara contra Máscara main event match, involving ”The Original” El Grande Americano vs. El Grande Americano at the arena.
- 8th Shito-Ryu Karate-Do World Championships were held October 17–23, 2015, at the arena.
- Monterrey Steel National Arena League football in 2017.
- Monterrey Kings coming to Arena Football One in 2026.

=== Concerts ===
List of Concerts
- Juan Gabriel – November 27, 2003, November 20–22, 2008 and November 27–28, 2014
- Luis Miguel – February 20–23, 2004, March 2–5, 2006, February 19–22, 2009 and March 1–2, 2012
- Thalía – May 1, 2004
- KISS – August 14–15, 2004, with Poison and October 1, 2012, with Mötley Crüe and The Treatment
- The Cure – September 2, 2004
- Yes – September 22, 2004, with Dream Theater and May 28, 2011, with Asia
- The Backstreet Boys – October 19, 2004, March 12, 2008, March 9, 2009, March 18, 2011 and February 24-25, 2020
- Green Day – December 3, 2004
- Yanni – December 4, 2004, July 1 and October 13, 2009, January 26, 2011 and March 22, 2012
- Duran Duran – February 23, 2005
- The Beastie Boys – March 5, 2005
- America – March 16, 2005, with The Little River Band
- Asia – April 28, 2005
- Kumbia Kings – April 30, 2005
- La Academia's Fourth Generation Finale – July 3, 2005
- Tiziano Ferro – July 23, 2005
- The Eagles – November 4, 2005
- Ricky Martin – November 17, 2005, March 30–31 and September 15–16, 2007 and May 21–23 and November 4, 2011
- Def Leppard – November 19, 2005 and September 6, 2012, with Poison and Lita Ford
- Mötley Crüe – March 22, 2006 and October 7, 2008
- The Buena Vista Social Club – March 23, 2006
- The Black Eyed Peas – April 5, 2006
- Mägo de Oz – April 27, 2006, May 5, 2007, with WarCry and U.D.O., June 1, 2008, April 22, 2010 and April 9 and December 16, 2011
- Depeche Mode – May 7, 2006, with She Wants Revenge and October 6, 2009
- Hilary Duff – May 16, 2006 and January 12, 2008
- Alejandra Guzmán – July 27, 2006, November 18, 2008 and February 13, 2010
- Poison – September 2, 2006, with Cinderella and June 1, 2011, with Warrant and FireHouse
- Kenny G – November 12, 2006
- Meat Loaf & His Neverland Express – November 15, 2006
- The Pet Shop Boys – November 16, 2006 and September 29, 2009
- Morrissey – November 18, 2006, with Kristeen Young and December 5, 2011
- Journey – November 21, 2006 and April 13, 2011, with Night Ranger and The Sweet
- INXS – November 23, 2006
- Joaquín Sabina – November 29, 2006, April 29, 2010 and November 12, 2012
- Andrea Bocelli – December 6, 2006, with Ailyn Pérez
- The Killers – December 12, 2006, with Roulette and División Minúscula, November 3, 2009 and April 9–10, 2013
- Moderatto – January 26, 2007, January 29, 2009 and June 14, 2011
- Zoé – January 31, 2007
- Michael Bolton – February 21, 2007
- Placebo – March 14, 2007, with The Satin Dolls
- Julio Iglesias – March 16, 2007 and September 22, 2008
- Álex Ubago – March 18, 2007
- Il Divo – March 19, 2007, June 18, 2009 and April 30–May 1, 2014
- Tributo Al Más Grande – March 23, 2007
- Delirium – April 27–30, 2007
- Pepe Aguilar – May 9, 2007
- Emmanuel – May 18, 2007 and November 15, 2008
- Guns N' Roses – June 2, 2007, with The Volture and October 23, 2011
- The Beach Boys – June 7, 2007
- Alice Cooper – June 15, 2007
- Beyoncé – July 11, 2007 and September 24, 2013
- Gwen Stefani – July 13, 2007, with Plastilina Mosh
- Erasure – July 19, 2007
- Scorpions – August 17, 2007, September 21, 2008, September 4, 2010 and September 5, 2012, with Avalanch
- Lola...Érase una vez – August 31, 2007
- Heaven & Hell – September 1, 2007, with Down
- Manzarek–Krieger – October 3, 2007, with Mark Farner
- Ricardo Montaner – October 4, 2007, October 23–24, 2008 and March 19, 2015
- Daddy Yankee – October 12, 2007
- Incubus – October 17, 2007, with The Bravery and November 27, 2013
- Joan Manuel Serrat – October 19, 2007, with Joaquín Sabina and October 23, 2012, with Joaquín Sabina
- Franco De Vita – October 26, 2007, with Molotov and February 1, 2014
- Daft Punk – November 2, 2007, with Lenny Kravitz and Telefunka
- Evanescence – November 7, 2007, with Julien-K and January 26, 2012
- Kenny Rogers – November 10, 2007
- The Police – November 27–28, 2007, with Fiction Plane
- Billy Joel – December 9, 2007
- Paul van Dyk – January 19, 2008
- Toto – February 5, 2008
- Maná – February 7–8 and May 8, 2008 and October 21–22, 2011
- Deep Purple – February 14, 2008 and February 24, 2011
- Jesús Adrián Romero – February 16, 2008, with Marcela Gándara, December 4, 2009, April 24, 2010 and November 17, 2012
- PXNDX – February 17, 2008 and December 6, 2009
- Iron Maiden – February 22, 2008
- Bob Dylan – February 29, 2008
- Café Tacuba – March 28, 2008 and June 19, 2009
- Rod Stewart – April 1, 2008 and August 19, 2012
- KoЯn – April 11, 2008, with The Black Label Society
- The Smashing Pumpkins – April 16, 2008 and September 23, 2012
- John Digweed – April 19, 2008
- Groove Armada – April 24, 2008
- Enrique Iglesias – April 26, 2008 and March 25, 2009
- Creedence Clearwater Revisited – May 28, 2008
- Ennio Morricone – May 29, 2008
- Sin Bandera – May 31, 2008
- Roberto Carlos – June 13, 2008 and May 15, 2010
- Menudo – June 18, 2008
- Alizée – June 25, 2008
- The Orchestra – June 28, 2008
- Muse – July 16, 2008, with Sexy Marvin and October 9, 2013, with The Ruse
- Disney on Ice – August 7–10, 2008
- The Human League – August 13, 2008
- Lupita D'Alessio – August 15, 2008 and May 8, 2010
- Wisin & Yandel – August 22, 2008, Marcha 21, 2009, January 20, December 2, 2010, November 14, 2013, November 5, 2019 and August 27-28, 2022
- Simple Plan – October 2, 2008, with Tólidos
- Amanda Miguel & Diego Verdaguer – October 3, 2008
- Gloria Trevi – October 4, 2008, October 16, 2009, October 27, 2012, with Los Auténticos Decadentes and January 31, 2015
- Joan Sebastian – October 11, 2008 and October 10, 2009
- Kanye West – October 18, 2008, with Rihanna, Lupe Fiasco, N.E.R.D and DJ Craze
- Drake Bell – October 19, 2008 and June 18, 2010
- The Stone Temple Pilots – October 21, 2008, with Nine Inch Nails and November 28, 2010, with The Volture
- Judas Priest – October 27, 2008, with Testament
- Maldita Vecindad – October 31, 2008, with Panteón Rococó
- Juanes – November 1, 2008
- Maroon 5 – November 2, 2008, with Los Claxons and August 14, 2012, with Javier Colon
- Sarah Brightman – November 4, 2008, October 11, 2009 and November 7, 2013
- Miguel Bosé – November 13, 2008
- Gondwana – November 22, 2008, with Antidoping and Ganja
- Oasis – November 29, 2008, with The Secret Machines
- Hi-5 – November 30, 2008
- New Kids on the Block – December 4, 2008, with Lady Gaga and June 26, 2012
- Intocable – December 5–6, 2008 and December 4–6, 2014
- Tiësto – December 12, 2008
- Celine Dion – December 13, 2008
- Rihanna – January 22, 2009, with María José
- Alejandro Fernández – January 23–24 and May 7–8, 2009 and July 9 and October 15, 2010
- Chicago – February 11, 2009, January 13, 2011, February 26, 2013 and March 7, 2015
- Ha*Ash – February 13, 2009
- Alanis Morissette – February 18, 2009
- Keane – February 28, 2009, with Mike Sierra and August 29, 2012
- Hombres G – March 7 and December 2, 2009, with Enanitos Verdes, December 4, 2010 and November 7, 2012
- Enrique Bunbury – March 20, 2009
- Santana – March 26, 2009, March 9, 2012 and March 21, 2015
- Peter Gabriel – March 31, 2009, with Travis
- Los Fabulosos Cadillacs – April 16, 2009
- The Rasmus – April 25, 2009
- Calle 13 – May 15, 2009, with Los Concorde
- The MTY Summer Fest – May 29, 2009
- Ricardo Arjona – June 26–27 and July 17, 2009 and March 20, 2012
- La 5ª Estación – July 24, 2009
- The Jonas Brothers – July 31, 2009, with Demi Lovato and Jordin Sparks
- Testament – September 12, 2009
- Marc Anthony – September 23, 2009
- Laura Pausini – October 12, 2009, February 10, 2012, November 18, 2014, August 10, 2016, and July 31, 2018
- Kings of Leon – October 24, 2009, with The Features
- Gloria Estefan – November 1, 2009
- The Coca–Cola Zero Festival – November 11–13, 2009
- Paulina Rubio – November 18, 2009 and April 28, 2012
- The Arena Rock Fest – December 17, 2009
- The Yeah Yeah Yeahs – January 23, 2010, with Le Butcherettes
- The Cranberries – February 18 and September 24–25, 2010
- Yuridia – February 26, 2010
- Pitbull – February 27, 2010
- REO Speedwagon – March 4, 2010, with Styx
- Alejandro Sanz – March 6–7, 2010
- Nelly Furtado – March 15, 2010
- Franz Ferdinand – April 7, 2010
- Diana Krall – April 11, 2010
- Magnet – April 17, 2010
- Tokio Hotel – April 30, 2010
- Eros Ramazzotti – May 7, 2010 and October 20, 2016
- Creed – May 30, 2010
- Jenni Rivera – July 24, 2010 and December 8, 2012 (This was her final live performance, she died in a plane crash the following morning.)
- OV7 – October 22, 2010, April 2, 2011 and October 10, 2014
- Paul Oakenfold – October 28–29, 2010
- Ana Gabriel – October 30, 2010
- The Corona Music Fest – March 3, 2011 and June 2, 2012
- Mikel Erentxun – May 13, 2011, with La Unión and Nacho Vega
- Kylie Minogue – May 16, 2011
- Camila – July 29, 2011
- Michael Bublé – August 18, 2011, with Naturally 7 and August 6–7, 2014
- Katy Perry – September 5, 2011, with DJ Skeet Skeet and Natalia Kills and October 14–15, 2014, with Becky G
- Tears for Fears – September 21, 2011
- Justin Bieber – September 30, 2011, with Cobra Starship
- The Johann Strauss Orchestra – October 16, 2011
- Jamiroquai – February 27, 2012 and February 28, 2013
- Il Volo – April 21, 2012
- James – April 25, 2012
- Demi Lovato – May 3, 2012 and May 17, 2014
- The MTV World Stage Show – September 12, 2012 (Linkin Park) and October 3, 2013
- Bryan Adams – October 18, 2012
- Jenni Rivera - December 8, 2012
- 3 Doors Down & Daughtry – March 9, 2013, with Aranda
- Garbage – April 16, 2013
- Big Time Rush – August 15, 2013, with Victoria Justice and February 13, 2014
- The Classic Rock Event – September 7, 2013
- The xx – October 11, 2013
- La Arrolladora Banda El Limón – November 9, 2013
- Roger Hodgson – November 10, 2013
- The Indio Alter RockFest – January 11, 2014
- Romeo Santos – March 7, 2014 and February 11, 2015
- Avril Lavigne – May 13, 2014
- Bruno Mars & The Hooligans – September 5–6, 2014
- Los Plebes del Rancho de Ariel Camacho with Christian Nodal – November 25, 2016
- Miley Cyrus – September 16–17, 2014
- Linkin Park – June 25, 2015
- Super Junior – July 3, 2016
- Mariah Carey – November 9, 2016
- Sarah Brightman – December 5, 2016
- Fifth Harmony with Becky G – October 11, 2017
- J Balvin – November 1, 2017
- Intocable – November 30 – December 2, 2017
- WWE Live – December 3, 2017
- Carlos Rivera – December 8, 2017
- Maluma – December 13, 2017
- Reik – February 2, 2018
- Katy Perry – May 8–9, 2018
- Sam Smith – July 25, 2018
- Roger Waters – December 9, 2018
- Twenty One Pilots – May 1, 2019
- Karol G – June 9, 2022
- Harry Styles – November 22, 2022
- Westlife – March 20, 2024
- Katy Perry – April 28–29, 2025
- Rosalía – August 19, 2026
- Jamiroquai – Latin America Tour 2026, September 23, 2026.
- Soy Luna – October 21, 2026 and December 8, 2026

=== Others ===
- Nuestra Belleza Mexico 2008 – September 2008
