= National Arena League =

American indoor football league

- Most recent season or competition: 2025 National Arena League season
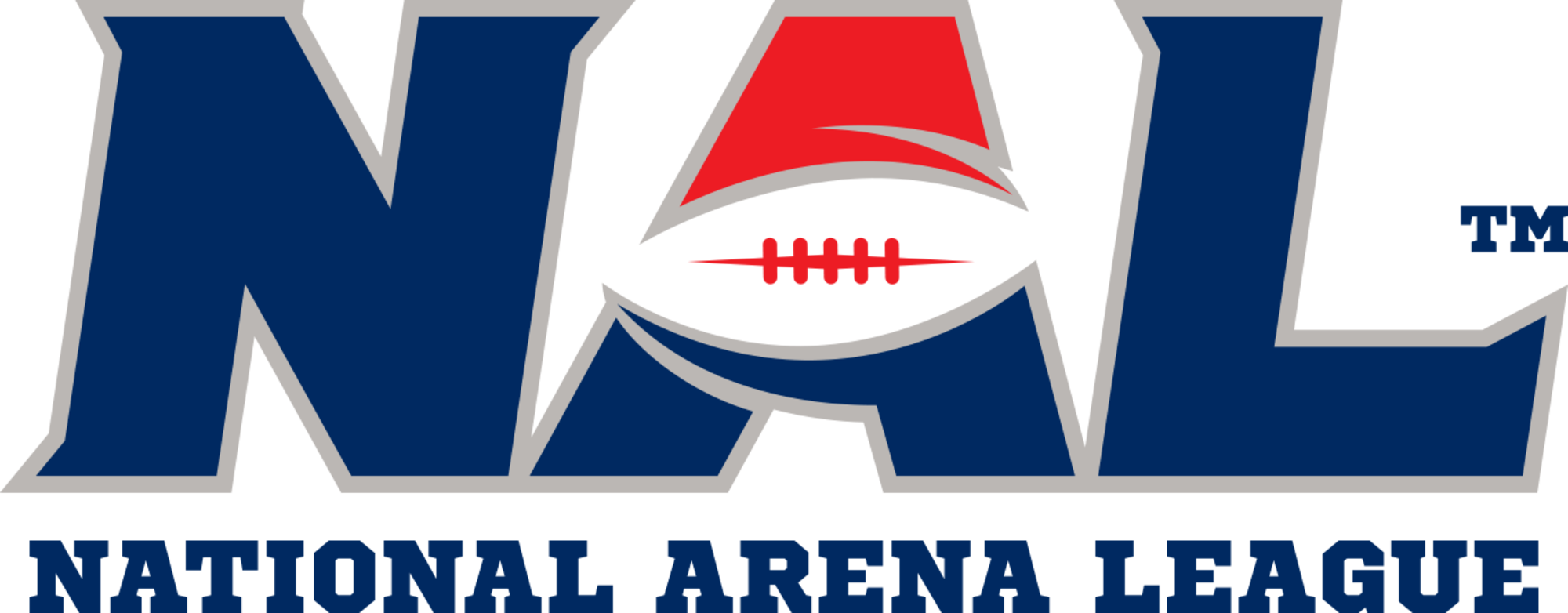
- Sport: Arena football
- Founded: 2016
- First season: 2017
- Commissioner: Brandon Ikard
- No. of teams: 8 (10 in 2027)
- Country: United States
- Headquarters: Conover, NC
- Most recent champion: Southwest Kansas Storm (1st title)
- Most titles: Jacksonville Sharks (3 titles)
- Streaming partners: Scripps Sports Network, NAL Network
- Sponsors: Southern New Hampshire University, Black Rifle Coffee, 1st Phorm, My Bookie, GOAT Sports, Hard AF Seltzer
- Related competitions: AF1, IFL, TAL
- Website: thenationalarenaleague.com

The National Arena League (NAL) is a professional indoor football league that began play in 2017. As of the end of the 2026 season, the league consisted of eight teams.

A team's typical budget is $400,000 to $500,000 per season. Players are usually paid $200 per week (before taxes), and veterans can make $225 with the potential raises for loyalty on a year-by-year basis. Additionally, $50 bonus can be given to players on the winning team each week. Starting quarterbacks can be paid up to $600 per game. Some teams also provide housing for their players during the season.

Teams' estimated annual revenue is between $500,000 and $800,000 a year.

== History ==
=== Origins ===
In June 2016, Columbus Lions' owner Skip Seda and father Keke Seda founded a league called the Arena Developmental League (ADL) in the wake of several years of minor indoor leagues folding. The league was announced to begin play in March 2017 and, while not affiliated with any other leagues, intended on developing players to be looked at by scouts in the Arena Football League (AFL), Canadian Football League (CFL), and National Football League (NFL). In their introductory press conference, the league announced former AFL, af2, and CFL head coach John Gregory as its first commissioner and former AFL and af2 head coach Chris Siegfried as director of football operations.

Charter teams began being announced in July 2016 with the Columbus Lions and Lehigh Valley Steelhawks joining from the defunct American Indoor Football. On July 21, the High Country Grizzlies announced their ADL membership after initially being announced as an AIF expansion team. On August 11, the Dayton Wolfpack were announced as the league's fourth team. On September 13, the ADL added the Georgia Firebirds from the AIF as the fifth team. On September 21, the league announced its sixth team to be from Highland Heights, Kentucky, owned by Northern Kentucky Professional Indoor Football LLC headed by W. Leland Bennett III. Bennett was one of the owners of the Northern Kentucky Nightmare, a travel team that played in the AIF the previous season, but no name for the ADL team was announced and the franchise was removed from the league when the league later changed names. In October, the ADL added the Anderson Gladiators from Anderson, South Carolina, but they were removed from the league in November due to arena lease issues. On October 17, the Corpus Christi Rage announced it had joined the ADL (although the ADL did not confirm until October 28). On October 20, the ADL announced that the Fort Myers area-based Florida Tarpons were joining the league. However, the Tarpons would also withdraw from the league on November 10 to join the upstart Arena Pro Football.

=== National Arena League: first seasons ===
==== 2017 season ====
On November 18, 2016, the league announced it had changed its name to National Arena League. As part of the change in name, the league management was also restructured so that it was no longer managed by Lions' owner Skip Seda, but was instead managed by all member teams equally. Later that day, the league added a former Arena Football League team, the Jacksonville Sharks. On November 30, the league added the Monterrey Steel from Monterrey, Nuevo León, Mexico, becoming the first American indoor/arena league to house a Mexican team as well as the first in fifteen years to house a team from outside the United States. In order to satisfy the Sharks' contract with their arena, they were given eight home games in the 12-game season. To balance the uneven scheduling, the Corpus Christi Rage and Dayton Wolfpack each only were given five home games while the other five teams each had six. This was changed again when the Wolfpack apparently never were able to secure an arena lease, despite announcing they would play at the Nutter Center and signed players were reporting on social media that all players had been cut. As of February 20, 2017, all Wolfpack home games were canceled. During the season, the league took over operations of the Firebirds, Rage, and Wolfpack. The Sharks would go on to finish with an 11–1 record and win the inaugural championship game over the Lions. The Rage and Wolfpack folded at the end of the season.

During the first season, the league announced the first 2018 expansion team in the Jersey Flight of Trenton, New Jersey. During the summer league meetings, the NAL conditionally approved ownership groups in Boston, Providence, Richmond, and Orlando with an expansion application deadline of August 15, 2017. The Richmond Roughriders, formerly of Arena Pro Football, confirmed the next day that they were finalizing their NAL expansion requirements. However, on September 13, the Roughriders announced they were joining the American Arena League instead.

==== 2018 season ====
On September 28, 2017, the NAL announced on their Facebook page that the Jacksonville Sharks, Lehigh Valley Steelhawks, Columbus Lions, and Jersey Flight had all signed three-year NAL membership agreements and committed to play in the league until 2020. The Monterrey Steel could not commit for 2018 citing the 2017 Central Mexico earthquake. The Georgia Firebirds could not commit due to an ownership transition, but failed to obtain an arena lease. Despite the initially announced August 15 deadline, the next confirmed expansion team was announced in November as the Massachusetts Pirates based out of Worcester, Massachusetts. In the expansion announcement, the league also mentioned adding teams in Greensboro, North Carolina, and Portland, Maine, but no mention of the other previously conditionally approved teams in Boston, Providence, or Orlando. The Carolina Cobras were announced in Greensboro on December 4 and the Maine Mammoths on December 5, with both teams owned by National Sports Ventures, and organization led by NAL executive Rob Storm and Atlanta businessman Richard Maslia and includes Sharks' owner and expansion chairman Jeff Bouchy. The Monterrey Steel and the expansion Jersey Flight would be removed from the league for failing to meet the minimum league obligations prior to the release of the 2018 schedule.

In October 2017, commissioner Gregory stepped down and was replaced by the director of operations, Chris Siegfried. The 2018 season began on April 7, 2018. All three expansion teams fared well, with the Cobras winning the league championship, the Pirates finishing the regular season in first place, and the Mammoths ending the season on a five-game winning streak. However, the Lehigh Valley Steelhawks finished the season winless and the owner announced he was trying to sell the team, while the Mammoths were also announced as looking for local ownership.

==== 2019 season ====
The league announced its first addition of the 2019 season in the New York Streets with plans to play at the Westchester County Center in White Plains, New York, in December 2018. A revived Orlando Predators team, owned and coached by players from the former Arena Football League team of the same name, was added on January 17, 2019. After failing to reach an agreement with local ownership, both the Lehigh Valley Steelhawks and Maine Mammoths announced they had suspended operations for the season. Prior to the 2019 season, Sharks' majority owner and NAL expansion chairman Jeff Bouchy resigned and sold his interest in the team to the other owners on March 11, 2019. The Sharks won the 2019 NAL championship.

=== 2020–present ===
==== 2020 ====
Following the season, the NAL announced it had partnered with Champions Indoor Football (CIF) to create a new league for the 2020 season under a new identity with two conferences: the CIF and NAL. The Massachusetts Pirates chose to not join the merged league and the New York Streets were not mentioned as an included team. However, it was announced on October 10 that the deal had been postponed, with both leagues playing their own individual schedules in 2020. The Pirates rejoined the NAL and the league then added two teams that had originally been given conditional approval to join in the 2018 season, the Jersey Flight and the West Virginia Roughriders (then known as the Richmond Roughriders), from the American Arena League. As with almost all other sports leagues, the NAL suspended operations during the COVID-19 pandemic, with intention to hold the season once social distancing mandates were lifted and it was safe to do so. The season was fully canceled by June 12, 2020.

==== 2021 season ====
Following the cancellation of the 2020 season, Massachusetts Pirates left for the Indoor Football League (IFL), while the NAL announced the additions of the Albany Empire, Baltimore Lightning, Louisville Xtreme, Ontario Bandits, and the Tampa Bay Tornadoes. The Baltimore franchise membership was revoked less than three weeks after being announced. The Louisville and Tampa Bay organizations left the league three months after being added, and the West Virginia Roughriders opted to go dormant for 2021 while the owner was trying to sell the team. Louisville instead joined the IFL. The start of the 2021 season was delayed to at least May 2021 due to the ongoing restrictions in the pandemic. One week before the start of the 2021 season, the Ontario Bandits went dormant.

==== 2022 season ====
For the 2022 season, the league announced it was going to start playing using ironman rules, where most players must play both offense and defense, as originally used by the Arena Football League from 1987 to 2007. In October 2021, the Roughriders stated they will not return to the NAL during a dispute with the league contract, but were then in discussions with selling the team to the ownership group led by Ron Trideco to keep the team in the NAL. On November 11, the league announced the San Antonio Gunslingers as an expansion team after playing their inaugural 2021 season in the AAL. The Roughriders, Ontario Bandits, and Jersey Flight were eventually removed from the list of 2022 NAL teams and were not included in the schedule.

==== 2023 season ====
On July 14, 2022, the league announced its first addition for the 2023 season in Fayetteville, North Carolina, later named the Fayetteville Mustangs. At halftime of the 2022 NAL championship, the league announced the West Texas Warbirds from Odessa, Texas, would be joining the league for 2023. On August 24, 2022, the league announced the return of rebound nets, which had been popularized by the Arena Football League. On December 22, the membership of the Columbus Lions was discontinued and the team left the league.

Due to various financial problems, both the Albany Empire and Fayetteville Mustangs were removed the league schedule during the season.

The Sharks won the 2023 NAL championship.

==== 2024 season ====
In August 2023, the league announced it had added the Omaha Beef and Sioux City Bandits from Champions Indoor Football for the 2024 season. On August 22, 2023, the Jacksonville Sharks announced they were joining the Indoor Football League (IFL). The league added the expansion Colorado Spartans, based out of Loveland, Colorado, on August 31. Also on August 31, the Warbirds, which had been renamed as the West Texas Desert Hawks, were announced as joining the relaunched Arena Football League. On September 14, the Topeka Tropics also joined the NAL from the CIF. On September 21, the two-time American West Football Conference champions Idaho Horsemen joined the NAL. On September 26, the San Antonio Gunslingers were announced as also joining the IFL. The next day, the North Texas Bulls announced their membership in the NAL. On October 16, the Oklahoma Flying Aces were as announced as the eighth and final team for the 2024 NAL season. The NAL, however, terminated the North Texas Bulls' membership on February 16, 2024, due to "failure to pay league dues as well as failure to provide an executed arena lease for the upcoming 2024 season." The announcement came one day after the NAL revoked the Topeka Tropics' membership "due to violations of their League Affiliation Agreement, including failure to pay league dues and meeting other criteria to participate in the upcoming 2024 season". The NAL stated it was in discussions with new ownership as it tried to keep a Topeka team part of the 2024 season. The Tropics put out an open letter begging members of the Topeka business community to buy and save the franchise. On February 28, 2024, the league terminated the Tropics membership.

==== 2025 season ====
On June 21, 2024, the Wheeling Miners, formerly of the American Arena League, joined the NAL for the 2025 season. On July 9, 2024, the league announced a merger with the remaining teams in American Indoor Football and added the Corpus Christi Tritons and Harrisburg Stampede and welcomed back the Columbus Lions. On August 15, 2024, the first-year Shreveport Rouxgaroux joined the NAL. On August 20, 2024, the Amarillo Dusters (formerly known as the Venom and played in various leagues over the last 20 years) joined the NAL. The Stampede folded, while the NAL expelled the Dusters and Tritons, ostensibly blaming "noncompliance," but later clarifying that the NAL had been having difficulty booking dates at its other teams' arenas; the Tritons instead joined Arena Football One. On February 4, 2025, the league announced that they had promoted executive Brandon Ikard to commissioner replacing former commissioner Todd Walkenhorst. For the 2025 season, the NAL dropped the rebound nets and returned to traditional goalposts.

On February 21, 2025, the NAL secured a television contract with Right Now TV, a multicast network with over-the-air affiliates and free ad-supported streaming.

The Carolina Cobras suspended operations April 24, 2025, citing "unforeseen circumstances."

==== 2026 season ====
On June 30, 2025, the West Texas Warbirds announced that they would rejoin the NAL starting in 2026 and were rebranded the Amarillo Warbirds.

On July 2, 2025, the reigning champion Beaumont Renegades announced that they were leaving the NAL. They would later join the AF1.

On August 1, 2025, the expansion Pueblo Punishers joined the NAL.

On August 13, 2025, the Dallas Bulls rejoined the NAL under their new name for the 2026 season. Shortly thereafter, the Columbus Lions and Wheeling Miners were both removed from the NAL website, with both joining a revival of the American Arena League. The departures leave the NAL's geographic footprint entirely west of the Mississippi River, returning it to a regional league.

On September 19, 2025 the Salina Liberty and Southwest Kansas Storm announced moves from Arena Football One to the NAL. Both teams fit within the league's midwestern footprint and also will be able to reestablish rivalries with the Warbirds, Beef and Bandits that they had in other leagues. In the Storm's press release, the NAL announced it had concluded expansion for the 2026 season and the Idaho Horsemen will go dormant for the season, preparing to return to play in 2027 in a new market.

Shortly after the start of the season, the league announced a television agreement with the E. W. Scripps Company that will see select NAL games carried on its new online platform Scripps Sports Network.

The Bulls were expelled from the NAL on April 28, 2026 for "failure to satisfy... financial and administrative obligations."

On May 28, 2026, the Dallas Apex was announced as the NAL's first expansion team for the 2027 season.

In August, it was reported that the Wheeling Miners would return to the NAL after one year in the AAL.

== Teams ==
=== Map of teams ===
NAL team locations

=== Current members ===
Team	Location	Arena	Capacity	Founded	Joined	Head coach
Amarillo Warbirds	Amarillo, Texas	Amarillo Civic Center	4,912	2019 (Note: In Champions Indoor Football.)	2023, 2026 (Note: Team played the 2023 NAL season, then left for the Arena Football League (2024) and changed their name to the West Texas Desert Hawks before folding midseason. Resurrected under original ownership and nickname and rejoined the NAL for the 2026 season.)	Jermaine Blakely
Colorado Spartans	Denver, Colorado	Denver Coliseum	8,140	2023	2024	Fred Shaw
Dallas Apex	Mesquite, Texas	Gomez Western Wear Arena	7,000	2026	2027	Corey Mayfield
Louisiana Rouxgaroux	Bossier City, Louisiana	Brookshire Grocery Arena	10,300	2024	2025	Michael Blair
Omaha Beef	Omaha, Nebraska	Liberty First Credit Union Arena	4,600	2000 (Note: In the Indoor Professional Football League.)	2024	Adam Loftis
Pueblo Punishers	Pueblo, Colorado	Southwest Motors Events Center	8,225	2025	2026	Tae Brooks & Clinton Solomon
Salina Liberty	Salina, Kansas	Tony's Pizza Events Center	7,583	2016 (Note: In Champions Indoor Football.)	2026	Heron O'Neal
Sioux City Bandits	Sioux City, Iowa	Tyson Events Center	6,941	2000 (Note: In the original Indoor Football League.)	2024	Erv Strohbeen
Southwest Kansas Storm	Dodge City, Kansas	United Wireless Arena	5,300	2022 (Note: In Champions Indoor Football.)	2026	Gary Thomas
Wheeling Miners	Wheeling, West Virginia	WesBanco Arena	4,700	2023 (Note: In American Arena League.)	2024, 2026	Chris McKinney

=== Former members ===
Team	Location	Joined	Departed	Notes
Albany Empire	Albany, New York	2021	2023	League membership terminated due to non-payment of league dues. Owner Antonio Brown was fined for conduct detrimental to the league, a fine included with league dues, and Brown failed to pay that fine. Reorganized as the Albany Firebirds and joined Arena Football League (2024), then Arena Football One.
Amarillo Dusters	Amarillo, Texas	Never played		were terminated by the league on February 2, 2025. Franchise sold to a new ownership group, have relocated to Louisiana and were rebranded the Bayou Bucks.
Anderson Gladiators	Anderson, South Carolina	Never played		Announced as a team for the ADL's inaugural 2017 season, but were later removed by the league. Anderson subsequently announced plans to join Supreme Indoor Football, but never played a game.
Baltimore Lightning	Baltimore, Maryland	Never played		Announced as a 2021 expansion team, but league terminated franchise two weeks later when team failed to post required Letter of Credit. Now an outdoor developmental team; most recently attempted to join the International Football Alliance but
Beaumont Renegades	Beaumont, Texas	2025		Played the 2025 season won the league championship, then left via mutual agreement. Joined Arena Football One shortly afterward.
Carolina Cobras	Greensboro, North Carolina	2018	2025	Cancelled the rest of the 2025 season, had planned to return in 2026 under new ownership, but not listed on the NAL schedule for the year.
Columbus Lions	Columbus, Georgia	2017, 2025	2022, 2025	A founding franchise that helped create the Arena Development League (ADL) and later the National Arena League. Team then played the first five seasons of the NAL. The team was sold to new ownership in the 2022 offseason and the league subsequently discontinued the membership of the Lions. Team later returned to the NAL for the 2025 season, but the following offseason was removed from the NAL website's list of teams. The Lions would later announce they joined the American Arena League for the 2026 season.
Corpus Christi Rage	Corpus Christi, Texas	2017		Team operations were assumed by the league after four games, with operations ceased at conclusion of the season.
Corpus Christi Tritons	Corpus Christi, Texas	Never played		Were to have joined the league, but were left off of the 2025 season schedule and looking at other leagues. The team claimed that they were left off the schedule because the league failed to acknowledge that they met all league requirements, a claim the league has yet to address. The team has since joined rival Arena Football One.
Dallas Bulls	Fair Park, Texas	2026		Initially attempted to join NAL as the "North Texas Bulls" in September 2023 after being a member of the Arena Football Association, however, membership was revoked prior to start of the 2024 season. Were eventually admitted to play in the 2026 season and played five games in the NAL before being expelled.
Dayton Wolfpack	Traveling team	2017		Originally intended to play in Dayton, Ohio; the original team operators failed to secure an arena lease. League ran the team as a traveling team for other team's home games using various semi-professional units based out of Georgia during the 2017 season.
Fayetteville Mustangs	Fayetteville, North Carolina	2022	2023	Joined as an expansion team for the 2023 season, but withdrew during the season after playing eight games.
Florida Tarpons	Estero, Florida	Never played		Joined ADL on October 20, 2016, after playing in American Indoor Football (AIF). Subsequently announced they had joined Arena Pro Football for 2017 instead but never played a game.
Georgia Firebirds	Albany, Georgia	2017		Joined the ADL after playing in American Indoor Football. League assumed operations during 2017 season. After the season, the league announced that the team was changing ownership but could not commit to the 2018 season until the new ownership obtained a new arena lease. In November 2017, the Firebirds were removed as league members.
Harrisburg Stampede	Harrisburg, Pennsylvania	Never played		Were to have joined the league with other former AIF teams, but folded on December 3, 2024 before they were to have played.
High Country Grizzlies	Boone, North Carolina	2017		Originally an AIF expansion team, one of the first ADL teams announced. Left after 2017 for the newly formed American Arena League.
Jacksonville Sharks	Jacksonville, Florida	2017	2023	One of the NAL's founding members in 2017 that joined from the Arena Football League. Left for the Indoor Football League after winning the 2023 NAL championship.
Jersey Flight	Trenton, New Jersey	2020	2021	An announced 2018 expansion team that was removed from the league prior to the release of the 2018 schedule. Team then joined the American Arena League. Under new ownership, the NAL announced the team as a member for the 2020 season. The team ceased operations prior to the 2022 season.
Lehigh Valley Steelhawks	Allentown, Pennsylvania	2017	2018	One of the first two teams announced in the ADL and then played the first two NAL seasons. The team suspended operations after the ownership failed to find a buyer to operate the team for the 2019 season.
Louisville Xtreme	Louisville, Kentucky	Never played		Announced by the NAL as a 2021 expansion team, but league membership was terminated three months later. The team then joined the Indoor Football League a week later, but folded a few weeks into the season.
Maine Mammoths	Portland, Maine	2018		Established along with the Carolina Cobras for the 2018 season by National Sports Ventures, a company that included league expansion chairman and Jacksonville Sharks owner Jeff Bouchy, NAL executive Rob Storm, and Atlanta businessman Richard Maslia. After failing to secure local ownership, the Mammoths suspended operations before the 2019 season. In September 2019, the league announced it is finalizing the process for the Mammoths to return in 2020 but never made it on the 2020 schedule.
Massachusetts Pirates	Worcester, Massachusetts	2018	2020	Announced by the NAL as a 2018 expansion team. The team entered the league with a three-year league affiliation agreement. Not offered another three-year membership agreement before the 2021 season after the team was openly looking to join other leagues. The Pirates joined the Indoor Football League for the 2021 season.
Monterrey Steel	Monterrey, Nuevo Leon	2017		Played the inaugural 2017 season as an expansion team; could not commit to the 2018 season and were removed from the league.
New York Streets	White Plains, New York	2019		Announced by the NAL as a 2019 expansion team. Played on an undersized field at the Westchester County Center where, among other things, the lockers of players of the visiting Carolina Cobras were robbed during a game. Ceased operations afterward.
Northern Kentucky	Highland Heights, Kentucky	Never played		An unnamed team created from the former travel-only team, the Northern Kentucky Nightmare, that played in the AIF in 2016 and was initially announced as an inaugural ADL team. Team was removed when the ADL changed names to the NAL.
Ontario Bandits	Ontario, California	Never played		Announced as a 2021 expansion team, but then went dormant for the season. Not listed as a member for the 2022 season.
Oklahoma Flying Aces	Enid, Oklahoma	2024		Joined from the Champions Indoor Football merger in 2023. The team terminated their season after four games after announcing ownership restructuring.
Orlando Predators	Orlando, Florida	2019	2023	Started as an expansion team in 2019 named for the former Arena Football League team. Joined the third incarnation of the AFL for 2024.
San Antonio Gunslingers	San Antonio, Texas	2022	2023	Joined from the American Arena League for the 2022 season. Joined the Indoor Football League for the 2024 season.
Tampa Bay Tornadoes	Tampa, Florida	Never played		Announced as a 2021 expansion team, but the league terminated the team's membership three months later. The organization re-joined the American Arena League.
Topeka Tropics	Topeka, Kansas	Never played		Joined NAL in 2023 after being a member of Champions Indoor Football, however, membership was revoked on February 28, 2024.
West Texas Warbirds	Odessa, Texas	2023		Started as an expansion team in 2020 and was to have played with Champions Indoor Football before the COVID-19 pandemic scrapped those plans. Joined the NAL for one season in 2023, then joined the third incarnation of the Arena Football League for 2024 and were rebranded the West Texas Desert Hawks.
West Virginia Roughriders	Wheeling, West Virginia	Never played		Announced as a 2020 expansion team that previously played in the American Arena League. Team suspended operations due to onset of COVID-19 pandemic. Listed as dormant member thorough the 2020 and 2021 seasons, but left the league prior to 2022 season due to a financial dispute with the NAL having never played a game.

== Championships ==
Year	Champion _{(Record in Championship Games)}	Runner-up _{(Record in Championship Games)}	Game Site _{(Games Hosted)}	Score	Notes	Attendance
2017	Jacksonville Sharks (1–0)	Columbus Lions (0–1)	Jacksonville Veterans Memorial Arena	27–21		9,730
2018	Carolina Cobras (1–0)	Columbus Lions (0–2)	Greensboro Coliseum Complex	66–8		
2019	Jacksonville Sharks (2–0)	Carolina Cobras (1–1)	Jacksonville Veterans Memorial Arena (2)	52–48		
2020	Season cancelled due to the COVID-19 pandemic					
2021	Albany Empire (1–0)	Columbus Lions (0–3)	MVP Arena	79–62		4,014
2022	Albany Empire (2–0)	Carolina Cobras (1–2)	MVP Arena (2)	47–20		4,281
2023	Jacksonville Sharks (3–0)	Carolina Cobras (1–3)	Jacksonville Veterans Memorial Arena (3)	54–45		8,539
2024	Omaha Beef (1–0)	Sioux City Bandits (0–1)	Liberty First Credit Union Arena	47–46	2OT	
2025	Beaumont Renegades (1–0)	Omaha Beef (1–1)	Doggett Ford Park	37–29		

== Commissioners ==
- Brandon Ikard (2025–present)
- Todd Walkenhorst (2023–2025)
- Chris Siegfried (2017–2023)
- John Gregory (2016)
