= 2015 San Jose SaberCats season =

Arena Football League team season

- Owner: John Fry; William Randy Fry; David Fry; Kathryn J. Kolder; Darren Arbet
- General manager: Darren Arbet
- Head coach: Darren Arbet
- Home stadium: SAP Center at San Jose

Results
- Record: 17–1
- Division place: 1st NC Pacific
- Playoffs: Won Conference Semifinal (Thunder) 55–28; Won NC Championship (Rattlers) 70–67; Won ArenaBowl XXVIII (Jacksonville) 68–47

The 2015 San Jose SaberCats season was the team's 19th in San Jose, California. The team was coached by Darren Arbet and played their home games at the SAP Center at San Jose. They finished first in the Pacific Division with a 17–1 regular season record and went on to defeat the Jacksonville Sharks 68–47 in ArenaBowl XXVIII.

== Season summary ==
The SaberCats, following a tough loss to the Arizona Rattlers in the 2014 National Conference Championship Game, made a number of key moves in the 2014–15 offseason. The most notable of these moves saw the SaberCats sign quarterback Erik Meyer, the 2013 AFL MVP, to replace outgoing quarterback Russ Michna. The team revamped its secondary with the signings of superstar cornerback Virgil Gray and promising young defensive back Eric Crocker; the team also traded with the Portland Thunder for defensive lineman Donte Paige-Moss, who ultimately filled in for outgoing free agent Joe Sykes. These players joined a strong defensive core of David Hyland, Ken Fontenette, Francis Maka, Luis Vasquez, and 2014 Defensive Player of the Year Jason Stewart.

In addition to signing Meyer, the SaberCats made a handful of key additions on offense. They greatly bolstered their receiving corps by signing 2014 All-Arena receiver Darius Reynolds and 2013 Receiver of the Year Adron Tennell (both of which were to fill the void left by the loss of Dominique Curry); these signings added to a group that included superstar wideout Reggie Gray and veteran Ben Nelson. The SaberCats also traded for experienced center Jeff Maddux and signed 2014 All-Arena offensive lineman Colin Madison; these players joined star linemen George Bussey and Rich Ranglin. The team also retained All-Arena fullback Odie Armstrong and 2014 Kicker of the Year Nich Pertuit.

The SaberCats began their season in Las Vegas, Nevada, where they cruised to a 59–41 victory. The SaberCats then won each of their next ten games, mostly in lopsided fashion; over that span, only one team (the Tampa Bay Storm) lost by single digits. The SaberCats played fantastic defense despite the Week 3 loss of Virgil Gray to injury; he was replaced by Hall of Fame cornerback (and SaberCats legend) Clevan Thomas. On June 7, following a Portland Thunder loss, the 11–0 SaberCats clinched their second consecutive (and tenth overall) division championship. This ensured that they would reach the postseason for the fourth consecutive season.

The SaberCats' remarkable run ended one week later against the Los Angeles Kiss, who were 1–9 at the time. After forcing overtime on the final play of the fourth quarter, the SaberCats turned the ball over on downs; a subsequent Los Angeles score sealed a 48–42 loss. The SaberCats regrouped, winning their final six regular season games; their 17–1 record tied the 2014 Cleveland Gladiators for the best regular season finish in AFL history. The SaberCats triumphed despite losing George Bussey and Adron Tennell to injury; they replaced the players with center Antonio Narcisse and All-Arena wideout Maurice Purify, respectively. Numerous players received awards at the end of the season; most notable was Reggie Gray's selection as Wide Receiver of the Year. Gray finished the campaign with a franchise-record 44 receiving touchdowns.

In the first round of the playoffs, the SaberCats faced the Portland Thunder (who they crushed in a 55–28 rout). They then defeated their rivals, the three-time defending champion Arizona Rattlers, by the score of 70–67 in the Conference Championship game; the game was ultimately decided by a controversial call made with eight seconds left in the fourth quarter. The SaberCats proceeded to ArenaBowl XXVIII, where they faced off against the American Conference Champion Jacksonville Sharks; after a back-and-forth first half, the heavily favored SaberCats pulled away with 34 unanswered points in the third and fourth quarters (including two defensive touchdowns by David Hyland). The SaberCats won the game by the score of 68–47; in doing so, they became the only team in AFL history to win 20 games in a season. They joined the 2002 SaberCats as the only one-loss teams in league history.

The 2015 San Jose SaberCats posted, in many regards, the most dominant regular season in AFL history. They boasted the league's #1 offense and #1 defense; their point differential of +399 was the largest in league history. Similarly, the SaberCats averaged 22.17 more points per game than their opponents; this is the largest Margin of Victory (MOV) in AFL history. According to Arenafan.com, after accounting for league averages, the 2015 SaberCats' defense was the most dominant of all time.

== Standings ==
2015 National Conference standings
Team	Overall			Points			Records			
Team	W	L	T	PCT	PF	PA	DIV	CON	Home	Away
Pacific Division
^{(1)} San Jose SaberCats	17	1	0	.944	1061	662	6–0	13–1	8–1	9–0
^{(3)} Spokane Shock	7	11	0	.389	847	971	2–4	6–8	4–5	3–6
^{(4)} Portland Thunder	5	13	0	.278	819	908	1–5	4–10	5–4	0–9
West Division
^{(2)} Arizona Rattlers	14	4	0	.778	1003	825	5–1	10–4	8–1	6–3
Las Vegas Outlaws	5	12	1	.306	740	909	3–3	5–9	3–5–1	2–7
Los Angeles Kiss	4	14	0	.222	724	915	1–5	4–10	3–6	1–8

== Schedule ==
=== Regular season ===
The 2015 regular season schedule was released on December 19, 2014.

Week	Day	Date	Kickoff	Opponent	Results		Location	Attendance	Report
Week	Day	Date	Kickoff	Opponent	Score	Record	Location	Attendance	Report
1	Monday	March 30	7:30 p.m. PDT	at Las Vegas Outlaws	W 59–41	1–0	Thomas & Mack Center	6,569	
2	Saturday	April 4	7:30 p.m. PDT	Los Angeles KISS	W 54–28	2–0	SAP Center at San Jose	10,175	
3	Friday	April 10	4:30 p.m. PDT	at Tampa Bay Storm	W 36–27	3–0	Amalie Arena	8,588	
4	Friday	April 17	5:00 p.m. PDT	at Jacksonville Sharks	W 68–48	4–0	Jacksonville Veterans Memorial Arena	7,596	
5	Saturday	April 25	7:30 p.m. PDT	Portland Thunder	W 64–45	5–0	SAP Center at San Jose	7,125	
6	Saturday	May 2	6:00 p.m. PDT	at Arizona Rattlers	W 56–34	6–0	Talking Stick Resort Arena	8,249	
7	Saturday	May 9	7:30 p.m. PDT	Las Vegas Outlaws	W 61–28	7–0	SAP Center at San Jose	8,600	
8	Saturday	May 16	7:00 p.m. PDT	at Spokane Shock	W 83–28	8–0	Spokane Veterans Memorial Arena	7,519	
9	Saturday	May 23	7:30 p.m. PDT	Cleveland Gladiators	W 70–58	9–0	SAP Center at San Jose	7,474	
10	Saturday	May 30	3:00 p.m. PDT	at Portland Thunder	W 61–42	10–0	Moda Center	8,815	
11	Friday	June 5	7:30 p.m. PDT	Spokane Shock	W 55–26	11–0	SAP Center at San Jose	7,662	
12	Saturday	June 13	7:30 p.m. PDT	Los Angeles KISS	L 42–48 (OT)	11–1	SAP Center at San Jose	9,132	
13	Sunday	June 21	2:00 p.m. PDT	at Las Vegas Outlaws	W 63–21	12–1	Thomas & Mack Center	2,166	
14	Friday	June 26	7:00 p.m. PDT	at Spokane Shock	W 62–27	13–1	Spokane Veterans Memorial Arena	7,618	
15	Bye								
16	Friday	July 10	7:30 p.m. PDT	New Orleans VooDoo	W 56–35	14–1	SAP Center at San Jose	9,321	
17	Saturday	July 18	7:30 p.m. PDT	Portland Thunder	W 55–49 (OT)	15–1	SAP Center at San Jose	9,211	
18	Bye								
19	Friday	July 31	7:30 p.m. PDT	Arizona Rattlers	W 56–29	16–1	SAP Center at San Jose	10,633	
20	Saturday	August 8	7:00 p.m. PDT	at Los Angeles KISS	W 60–38	17–1	Honda Center	9,854	

=== Playoffs ===
Round	Day	Date	Kickoff	Opponent	Results	Location	Attendance	Report
NC Semifinals	Friday	August 14	7:30 p.m. PDT	Portland Thunder	W 55–28	SAP Center at San Jose	10,060	
NC Championship	Saturday	August 22	5:00 p.m. PDT	Arizona Rattlers	W 70–67	Stockton Arena		
ArenaBowl XXVIII	Saturday	August 29	7:00 p.m. EDT	Jacksonville Sharks	W 68–47	Stockton Arena	9,115	

== Roster ==
2015 San Jose SaberCats roster
Quarterbacks: 9 Erik Meyer; 10 Nathan Stanley; Fullbacks: 32 Odie Armstrong; Wide receivers: 1 Reggie Gray; 80 Ben Nelson; 12 Maurice Purify; 7 Darius Reynolds; 11 D. J. Stephens	Offensive linemen: 75 Cornelius Dixon; 54 Kimani Jones; 66 Jeff Maddux; 69 Antonio Narcisse; 64 Rich Ranglin; Defensive linemen: 90 Damien Borel; 40 Rodney Fritz; 13 Donte Paige-Moss; 99 Jason Stewart	Linebackers: 98 Francis Maka; Defensive backs: 5 Ken Fontenette; 3 David Hyland; 22 Fred Obi; 24 Kenny Okoro; 8 Clevan Thomas; Kickers: 18 Nich Pertuit	Injured reserve: 92 Gustave Benthin DL; 19 Diondre Borel WR; 6 Eric Crocker DB; 4 Virgil Gray DB; -- Chris McAllister DL; -- Viondy Merisma OL; 17 Adron Tennell WR; 96 Dimetrio Tyson DL; 36 Luis Vasquez DL; 21 Mike Willie WR; Refuse to report: Currently vacant; League suspension: -- Aaron Bellazin DL; -- Jasen Carlson OL; 76 Ray Feinga OL; -- Sean McDonald DL; -- Kris Redding DL; Other league exempt: -- Brian Folkerts FB; -- Justin Green DB; -- Michael Preston WR; 56 Randy Richards OL; -- Brett Smith QB; 15 Fred Williams WR; Inactive reserve: 15 Brandon Collins WR; 70 Colin Madison OL; Recallable reassignment: Currently vacant; Rookies in italics Roster updated August 21, 2015; 24 Active, 23 Inactive

== Staff ==
San Jose SaberCats staff
Front office: Owner/General Manager – Darren Arbet	Head coach: Head coach – Darren Arbet; Assistant head coach – Omarr Smith; Offensive coaches: Offensive coordinator – Terry Malley; Offensive line – Jeff Jarnigan; Defensive coaches: Defensive coordinator – Cedric Walker; Defensive line – Jeff Jarnigan; Special teams coaches: Special teams coordinator – Jeff Jarnigan
