= 2015 Jacksonville Sharks season =

Arena Football League team season

- Owner: Jeff Bouchy; Steve Curran; Larry Payne; Diva Nagula, D.O.
- General manager: Les Moss
- Head coach: Les Moss
- Home stadium: Jacksonville Veterans Memorial Arena

Results
- Record: 10–8
- Division place: 2nd AC South
- Playoffs: Won Conference Semifinals (Predators) 55-33; Won Conference Final (Soul) 61-56; Lost ArenaBowl XXVIII (San Jose) 47–68
- Team DPY: Joe Sykes

The 2015 Jacksonville Sharks season is the sixth season for the franchise in the Arena Football League. The team is coached by Les Moss and play their home games at the Jacksonville Veterans Memorial Arena. The Sharks finished 10-8 and qualified for the playoffs after missing out for the first time in franchise history the previous year.

== Standings ==
2015 American Conference standings
Team	Overall			Points			Records			
Team	W	L	T	PCT	PF	PA	DIV	CON	Home	Away
East Division
^{(1)} Philadelphia Soul	15	3	0	.833	1060	823	6–0	11–3	9–0	6–3
^{(4)} Cleveland Gladiators	8	10	0	.444	953	959	3–3	6–8	3–6	5–4
New Orleans VooDoo	3	14	1	.194	692	919	0–6	2–12	3–6	0–8–1
South Division
^{(2)} Orlando Predators	12	6	0	.667	1023	951	5–1	10–4	7–2	5–4
^{(3)} Jacksonville Sharks	10	8	0	.556	971	901	2–4	8–6	7–2	3–6
Tampa Bay Storm	7	11	0	.389	820	942	2–4	5–9	5–4	2–7

== Schedule ==
=== Regular season ===
The 2015 regular season schedule was released on December 19, 2014.

Week	Day	Date	Kickoff	Opponent	Results		Location	Attendance	Report
Week	Day	Date	Kickoff	Opponent	Score	Record	Location	Attendance	Report
1	Saturday	March 28	8:00 p.m. EDT	at New Orleans VooDoo	L 50–51	0–1	Smoothie King Center	3,833	
2	Friday	April 3	8:00 p.m. EDT	Orlando Predators	L 54–55	0–2	Jacksonville Veterans Memorial Arena	8,741	
3	Sunday	April 12	4:00 p.m. EDT	at Philadelphia Soul	L 52–63	0–3	Wells Fargo Center	9,043	
4	Friday	April 17	8:00 p.m. EDT	San Jose SaberCats	L 48–68	0–4	Jacksonville Veterans Memorial Arena	7,596	
5	Friday	April 24	8:00 p.m. EDT	Las Vegas Outlaws	W 60–28	1–4	Jacksonville Veterans Memorial Arena	9,682	
6	Saturday	May 2	7:30 p.m. EDT	at Tampa Bay Storm	L 28–63	1–5	Amalie Arena	11,124	
7	Friday	May 8	7:00 p.m. EDT	at Cleveland Gladiators	W 46–43	2–5	Quicken Loans Arena	9,872	
8	Saturday	May 16	7:00 p.m. EDT	Philadelphia Soul	W 55–47	3–5	Jacksonville Veterans Memorial Arena	9,465	
9	Saturday	May 23	8:00 p.m. EDT	at New Orleans VooDoo	W 70–41	4–5	Smoothie King Center	4,021	
10	Sunday	May 31	6:00 p.m. EDT	at Los Angeles KISS	W 41–35	5–5	Honda Center	8,235	
11	Saturday	June 6	7:00 p.m. EDT	Orlando Predators	W 66–51	6–5	Jacksonville Veterans Memorial Arena	10,127	
12	Friday	June 12	7:30 p.m. EDT	at Tampa Bay Storm	L 56–63	6–6	Amalie Arena	12,602	
13	Bye								
14	Saturday	June 27	7:00 p.m. EDT	Cleveland Gladiators	W 74–41	7–6	Jacksonville Veterans Memorial Arena	10,123	
15	Bye								
16	Saturday	July 11	10:00 p.m. EDT	at Portland Thunder	L 48–72	7–7	Moda Center	7,123	
17	Saturday	July 18	7:00 p.m. EDT	Philadelphia Soul	W 74–67	8–7	Jacksonville Veterans Memorial Arena	9,745	
18	Saturday	July 25	7:00 p.m. EDT	Tampa Bay Storm	W 63–16	9–7	Jacksonville Veterans Memorial Arena	13,092	
19	Saturday	August 1	7:00 p.m. EDT	at Orlando Predators	L 50–64	9–8	Amway Center	12,184	
20	Saturday	August 8	7:00 p.m. EDT	New Orleans VooDoo	W 36–33	10–8	Jacksonville Veterans Memorial Arena	11,486	

=== Playoffs ===
Round	Day	Date	Kickoff	Opponent	Results	Location	Attendance	Report
AC Semifinals	Saturday	August 15	7:30 p.m. EDT	at Orlando Predators	W 55–33	Amway Center	9,186	
AC Championship	Sunday	August 23	5:00 p.m. EDT	at Philadelphia Soul	W 61–56	Wells Fargo Center	9,378	
ArenaBowl XXVIII	Saturday	August 29	7:00 p.m. EDT	San Jose SaberCats	L 47–68	Stockton Arena	9,115	

== Roster ==
2015 Jacksonville Sharks roster
Quarterbacks: 14 Lee Chapple; 4 Tommy Grady; Fullbacks: 39 Derrick Ross; Wide receivers: 2 London Crawford; 25 Johnathan Haggerty; 81 Joe Hills; 11 Tiger Jones; 9 Michael Lindsey; 15 Prechae Rodriguez	Offensive linemen: 99 Jason Holman; 72 Cornelius Lewis; 62 Raymond McNeil; 93 Moqut Ruffins; 69 Wayne Tribue; Defensive linemen: 95 Scooter Berry; 91 Nicolas Jean-Baptiste; 56 Jerry Turner	Linebackers: 17 Alvin Ray Jackson; 40 Pierre Turner; Defensive backs: 6 LaRoche Jackson; 21 Greg Reid; 1 Micheaux Robinson; 10 Terrance Smith; Kickers: 28 Julian Rauch	Injured reserve: 7 Jimmy Gordon LB; 3 Jeron Harvey WR; 5 Chris Smith DB; 19 Joe Sykes DL; 0 Martin Wright DL; Refused to report: 5 Jeff Hughley WR; Other League Exempt: 9 Keon Lyn DB; Inactive reserve: Currently vacant; League suspension: 42 Caesar Rayford DL; Recallable reassignment: Currently vacant; Rookies in italics Roster updated August 26, 2015; 24 Active, 11 Inactive → More rosters
