= ArenaBowl XXVIII =

Jacksonville Sharks (American)	San Jose SaberCats (National)
47	68
	1	2	3	4	Total
JAX	14	19	0	14	47
SJ	6	21	28	13	68
- Date: August 29, 2015
- Stadium: Stockton Arena; Stockton, California
- MVP: Reggie Gray, San Jose: Erik Meyer, San Jose (Offensive Player of the Game); David Hyland, San Jose (Defensive Player of the Game); David Hyland, San Jose (Ironman of the Game)
- Attendance: 9,115
- Winning coach: Darren Arbet
- Losing coach: Les Moss

TV in the United States
- Network: ESPN
- Announcers: Ari Wolfe, Anthony Herron and Sherdrick Bonner

ArenaBowl XXVIII was the championship game of the 2015 Arena Football League season. It was played between the American Conference Champion Jacksonville Sharks and the National Conference Champion San Jose SaberCats. The game was played at Stockton Arena in Stockton, California.

This was the San Jose SaberCats' fourth ArenaBowl championship and fifth overall ArenaBowl appearance. It was the Jacksonville Sharks second ArenaBowl appearance, having won ArenaBowl XXIV in 2011.

The SaberCats finished the 2015 season with a combined 20-1 record, becoming the first team in league history to win twenty combined regular season and postseason games.

== Venue ==
The game was played at Stockton Arena in Stockton, California, as the Ringling Bros. and Barnum & Bailey Circus had booked the SaberCats' usual home arena of SAP Center from August 20 to 30.

== Television ==
This was the second consecutive ArenaBowl televised on ESPN.

== Background ==
=== Jacksonville Sharks ===
In 2015, the Sharks began the regular season with a 1–5 record, after having lost the first four games of the season. The Sharks then won their next five games and eventually finished the season with a 10-8 record, earning the third seed in the American Conference. In the conference semifinals, they defeated the Orlando Predators on the road in a 55–33 contest. They then won the conference finals on the road against the Philadelphia Soul by a score of 61–56.

2015 American Conference standings
Team	Overall			Points			Records			
Team	W	L	T	PCT	PF	PA	DIV	CON	Home	Away
East Division
^{(1)} Philadelphia Soul	15	3	0	.833	1060	823	6–0	11–3	9–0	6–3
^{(4)} Cleveland Gladiators	8	10	0	.444	953	959	3–3	6–8	3–6	5–4
New Orleans VooDoo	3	14	1	.194	692	919	0–6	2–12	3–6	0–8–1
South Division
^{(2)} Orlando Predators	12	6	0	.667	1023	951	5–1	10–4	7–2	5–4
^{(3)} Jacksonville Sharks	10	8	0	.556	971	901	2–4	8–6	7–2	3–6
Tampa Bay Storm	7	11	0	.389	820	942	2–4	5–9	5–4	2–7

Week	Date	Opponent	Result
1	March 28	at New Orleans	L 50–51
2	April 3	Orlando	L 54–55
3	April 12	at Philadelphia	L 52–63
4	April 17	San Jose	L 68–48
5	April 24	Las Vegas	W 60–28
6	May 2	at Tampa Bay	L 28–63
7	May 8	at Cleveland	W 46–43
8	May 16	Philadelphia	W 55–47
9	May 23	at New Orleans	W 70–41
10	May 31	at Los Angeles	W 41–35
11	June 6	Orlando	W 66–51
12	June 12	at Tampa Bay	L 56–63
13	Bye		
14	June 27	Cleveland	W 74–41
15	Bye		
16	July 11	at Portland	L 48–72
17	July 18	Philadelphia	W 74–67
18	July 25	Tampa Bay	W 63–16
19	August 1	at Orlando	L 50–64
20	August 8	New Orleans	W 36-33
–	August 15	at Orlando	W 55–33
–	August 23	at Philadelphia	W 61-56

=== San Jose SaberCats ===
In 2015, the SaberCats began the regular season with eleven straight wins. They clinched their second consecutive (and tenth overall) division championship when the Portland Thunder lost on June 7. The SaberCats' undefeated streak was snapped when they lost at home to the Los Angeles Kiss, who had a 1–9 record entering the game. The SaberCats won their last six games to finish with a franchise-best record of 17–1, with home-field advantage for the playoffs. In the conference semifinals, they defeated the Portland Thunder at home by a score of 55–28. They then won the conference finals at home against the Arizona Rattlers in a 70–67 contest.

2015 National Conference standings
Team	Overall			Points			Records			
Team	W	L	T	PCT	PF	PA	DIV	CON	Home	Away
Pacific Division
^{(1)} San Jose SaberCats	17	1	0	.944	1061	662	6–0	13–1	8–1	9–0
^{(3)} Spokane Shock	7	11	0	.389	847	971	2–4	6–8	4–5	3–6
^{(4)} Portland Thunder	5	13	0	.278	819	908	1–5	4–10	5–4	0–9
West Division
^{(2)} Arizona Rattlers	14	4	0	.778	1003	825	5–1	10–4	8–1	6–3
Las Vegas Outlaws	5	12	1	.306	740	909	3–3	5–9	3–5–1	2–7
Los Angeles Kiss	4	14	0	.222	724	915	1–5	4–10	3–6	1–8

Week	Date	Opponent	Result
1	March 30	at Las Vegas	W 59–41
2	April 4	Los Angeles	W 54–28
3	April 10	at Tampa Bay	W 36–27
4	April 17	at Jacksonville	W 68–48
5	April 25	Portland	W 64–45
6	May 2	at Arizona	W 56–34
7	May 9	Las Vegas	W 61–28
8	May 16	at Spokane	W 83–28
9	May 23	Cleveland	W 70–58
10	May 30	at Portland	W 61–42
11	June 5	Spokane	W 55–26
12	June 13	Los Angeles	L 42–48 (OT)
13	June 21	at Las Vegas	W 63–21
14	June 26	at Spokane	W 62–27
15	Bye		
16	July 10	New Orleans	W 56–35
17	July 18	Portland	W 55–49 (OT)
18	Bye		
19	July 31	Arizona	W 56–29
20	August 8	at Los Angeles	W 60–38
–	August 14	Portland	W 55–28
–	August 22	Arizona	W 70–67

== Box score ==
Quarter	1	2	3	4	Total
Sharks (AC)	14	19	0	14	47
SaberCats (NC)	6	21	28	13	68

at Stockton Arena, Stockton, California

- Date: August 29, 2015
- Game time: 7:00 p.m. EDT
- Game attendance: 9,115
- Referee: Dave Cutala

Scoring summary

Quarter	Time	Drive			Team	Scoring information	Score	
Quarter	Time	Plays	Yards	TOP	Team	Scoring information	JAX	SJ
1	11:08	6	48	3:52	JAX	Hills 23-yard touchdown reception from Grady, Rauch kick good	7	0
1	8:42	3	39	1:49	SJ	Gray 18-yard touchdown reception from Meyer, Pertuit kick no good	7	6
1	4:01	5	45	3:58	JAX	Jones 15-yard touchdown reception from Grady, Rauch kick good	14	6
2	13:45	7	45	4:35	SJ	Gray 4-yard touchdown reception from Meyer, Pertuit kick good	14	13
2	10:58	3	36	2:04	JAX	Hills 29-yard touchdown reception from Grady, Rauch kick no good	20	13
2	3:44	9	45	6:30	SJ	Armstrong 1-yard touchdown run, Pertuit kick good	20	20
2	1:54	2	8	1:09	JAX	Hills 3-yard touchdown reception from Grady, Rauch kick good	27	20
2	0:41	3	6	0:33	SJ	Meyer 6-yard touchdown run, Pertuit kick good	27	27
2	0:15	5	47	0:26	JAX	Hills 8-yard touchdown reception from Grady, Rauch kick no good	33	27
3	13:20	3	45	1:40	SJ	Stephens 26-yard touchdown reception from Meyer, Pertuit kick good	33	34
3	6:29	—	—	—	SJ	Interception returned 10 yards for touchdown by Hyland, Pertuit kick good	33	41
3	4:42	2	8	2:15	SJ	Reynolds 9-yard touchdown reception from Meyer, Pertuit kick good	33	48
3	3:54	—	—	—	SJ	Hyland 5-yard net recovery touchdown off kickoff, Pertuit kick good	33	55
4	10:54	5	45	3:13	SJ	Meyer 17-yard touchdown run, Pertuit kick no good	33	61
4	9:07	2	45	1:04	JAX	Smith 24-yard touchdown reception from Grady, Rauch kick good	40	61
4	7:37	1	11	0:59	SJ	Gray 6-yard touchdown reception from Stanley, Pertuit kick good	40	68
4	1:50	8	45	4:41	JAX	Smith 9-yard touchdown reception from Grady, Rauch kick good	47	68
"TOP" = time of possession. For other American football terms, see Glossary of American football.							47	68
