= 2015 Philadelphia Soul season =

Arena Football League team season

- Owner: Ron Jaworski; Craig Spencer; Pete Ciarrocchi; Cosmo DeNicola
- General manager: Thomas Goodhines
- Head coach: Clint Dolezel
- Home stadium: Wells Fargo Center

Results
- Record: 15–3
- Division place: 1st AC East
- Playoffs: Won Conference Semifinals (Gladiators) 47-35; Lost Conference Final (Sharks) 56-61
- Team MVP: Dan Raudabaugh
- Team OPY: Dan Raudabaugh

The 2015 Philadelphia Soul season was the tenth season for the franchise in the Arena Football League. The team is coached by Clint Dolezel and play their home games at the Wells Fargo Center. The Soul improved from their disappointing 9-9 record to 15-3. The Soul finished undefeated at home, the only team of the season to do so.

== Standings ==
2015 American Conference standings
Team	Overall			Points			Records			
Team	W	L	T	PCT	PF	PA	DIV	CON	Home	Away
East Division
^{(1)} Philadelphia Soul	15	3	0	.833	1060	823	6–0	11–3	9–0	6–3
^{(4)} Cleveland Gladiators	8	10	0	.444	953	959	3–3	6–8	3–6	5–4
New Orleans VooDoo	3	14	1	.194	692	919	0–6	2–12	3–6	0–8–1
South Division
^{(2)} Orlando Predators	12	6	0	.667	1023	951	5–1	10–4	7–2	5–4
^{(3)} Jacksonville Sharks	10	8	0	.556	971	901	2–4	8–6	7–2	3–6
Tampa Bay Storm	7	11	0	.389	820	942	2–4	5–9	5–4	2–7

== Schedule ==
=== Regular season ===
The 2015 regular season schedule was released on December 19, 2014.

Week	Day	Date	Kickoff	Opponent	Results		Location	Attendance	Report
Week	Day	Date	Kickoff	Opponent	Score	Record	Location	Attendance	Report
1	Sunday	March 29	7:00 p.m. EDT	at Orlando Predators	W 70–63	1–0	Amway Center	12,765	
2	Saturday	April 4	10:00 p.m. EDT	at Spokane Shock	W 54–43	2–0	Spokane Veterans Memorial Arena	8,635	
3	Sunday	April 12	4:00 p.m. EDT	Jacksonville Sharks	W 63–52	3–0	Wells Fargo Center	9,043	
4	Saturday	April 18	6:00 p.m. EDT	Cleveland Gladiators	W 63–48	4–0	Wells Fargo Center	10,008	
5	Sunday	April 26	4:00 p.m. EDT	at New Orleans VooDoo	W 55–42	5–0	Smoothie King Center	3,096	
6	Saturday	May 2	6:00 p.m. EDT	Portland Thunder	W 52–35	6–0	Wells Fargo Center	7,011	
7	Friday	May 8	7:30 p.m. EDT	Orlando Predators	W 62–48	7–0	Wells Fargo Center	8,633	
8	Saturday	May 16	7:00 p.m. EDT	at Jacksonville Sharks	L 47–55	7–1	Jacksonville Veterans Memorial Arena	9,465	
9	Saturday	May 23	7:30 p.m. EDT	at Tampa Bay Storm	W 71–27	8–1	Amalie Arena	13,921	
10	Saturday	May 30	6:00 p.m. EDT	Las Vegas Outlaws	W 51–43	9–1	Boardwalk Hall	6,514	
11	Saturday	June 6	6:00 p.m. EDT	New Orleans VooDoo	W 62–41	10–1	Wells Fargo Center	8,197	
12	Saturday	June 13	7:00 p.m. EDT	at Orlando Predators	L 42–45	10–2	Amway Center	10,473	
13	Saturday	June 20	10:00 p.m. EDT	at Los Angeles KISS	W 56–48	11–2	Honda Center	6,122	
14	Friday	June 26	7:30 p.m. EDT	Tampa Bay Storm	W 64–42	12–2	Wells Fargo Center	8,214	
15	Bye								
16	Saturday	July 11	1:00 p.m. EDT	Cleveland Gladiators	W 72–56	13–2	Wells Fargo Center	8,784	
17	Saturday	July 18	7:00 p.m. EDT	at Jacksonville Sharks	L 67–74	13–3	Jacksonville Veterans Memorial Arena	9,745	
18	Bye								
19	Sunday	August 2	4:00 p.m. EDT	New Orleans VooDoo	W 61–28	14–3	Wells Fargo Center	10,018	
20	Saturday	August 8	7:00 p.m. EDT	at Cleveland Gladiators	W 48–33	15–3	Quicken Loans Arena	12,474	

=== Playoffs ===
Round	Day	Date	Kickoff	Opponent	Results	Location	Attendance	Report
AC Semifinals	Saturday	August 15	5:00 p.m. EDT	Cleveland Gladiators	W 47–35	Wells Fargo Center	8,424	
AC Championship	Sunday	August 23	5:00 p.m. EDT	Jacksonville Sharks	L 56–61	Wells Fargo Center	9,378	

== Roster ==
2015 Philadelphia Soul roster
Quarterbacks: 9 Bryan Randall; 5 Dan Raudabaugh; Fullbacks: 24 Tommy Taggart; Wide receivers: 15 Harvey Binford; 11 Xavier Boyce; 21 Shaun Kauleinamoku; 19 Ryan McDaniel; 4 Lonnie Outlaw; 3 Marco Thomas	Offensive linemen: 74 Shannon Breen; 76 Adam Smith; 72 Neal Tivis; Defensive linemen: 95 Tyron Hurst; 98 Ted Jennings; 99 Justin Lawrence; 12 Bryan Robinson; 13 Padric Scott	Linebackers: 2 Beau Bell; 18 Joe Goosby; Defensive backs: 6 Brandon Freeman; 22 Dwayne Hollis; 25 James Romain; 23 LaRico Stevenson; Kicker: 28 Tommy Frevert	Injured reserve: 38 Uriah Grant DL; 7 Carlos Martinez K; 72 Keith Newell OL; 1 Kent Richardson DB; Refused to report: -- James Frazier DL; League suspension: -- Dominique Curry WR; -- Keyun Swinney OL; -- Walter Thomas OL; Other League Exempt: -- Maurice Leggett DB; Inactive reserve: 55 Daverin Geralds OL; 8 Jake Metz DL; Recallable reassignment: Currently vacant; Rookies in italics Roster updated August 18, 2015; 24 Active, 12 Inactive → More rosters
