= David Hyland =

American gridiron football player (born 1987)

No. 3, 5, 13
- Position: Defensive back

Personal information
- Born: May 30, 1987 (age 39); Woodstock, Georgia, U.S.
- Listed height: 6 ft 0 in (1.83 m)
- Listed weight: 194 lb (88 kg)

Career information
- High school: Etowah (Woodstock)
- College: Morehead State
- NFL draft: 2009: undrafted

Career history
- Oklahoma City Yard Dawgz (2010); BC Lions (2010–2011); Hamilton Tiger-Cats (2011); Utah Blaze (2012–2013); San Jose SaberCats (2014–2015); Jacksonville Sharks (2016); Baltimore Brigade (2018)

Awards and highlights
- ArenaBowl champion (2015); Al Lucas Hero Award (2015)

Career CFL statistics
- Tackles: 24
- Interceptions: 1
- Stats at CFL.ca (archived)

Career AFL statistics
- Tackles: 376.5
- Pass Breakups: 58
- Forced Fumbles: 5
- Fumble Recoveries: 15
- Interceptions: 24
- Stats at ArenaFan.com

David Hyland (born May 30, 1987) is an American former professional football defensive back who played in the Arena Football League (AFL) and Canadian Football League (CFL). He played college football at Morehead State.

== College career ==
Hyland played college football at Morehead State University ('05-'08) and appeared in 44 games in which he had 21 interceptions and 319 return yards to go along with three touchdowns. He also set a Division I-AA record with 61 career pass knockdowns. Hyland holds school records for longest interception return, most interceptions in a season and most interceptions in a career. In addition, he tied the school record for most interceptions in a game with three. In 2007, Hyland also earned All-America honors from The Sports Network and Football Gazette.

== Professional career ==
Hyland joined the Oklahoma City Yard Dawgz of the Arena Football League (AFL) in 2010, where he tallied eight interceptions in his rookie campaign. He led Oklahoma City in tackles and interceptions in his rookie year. His team also voted him as their Defensive Most Valuable Player. He was signed by the BC Lions as a free agent on September 7, 2010. After his release from BC, Hyland was signed to the Hamilton Tiger-Cats. He joined the AFL's Utah Blaze in 2012. Hyland would play for the Blaze for two seasons (2012 and 2013). In the former season, the Blaze reached the AFL's Conference Championship Game, which they narrowly lost to the Arizona Rattlers. Hyland's tenure with the Blaze would end abruptly, as the team folded at the conclusion of the 2013 season.

Hyland then joined the San Jose SaberCats. In 2014, despite missing ten of the team's eighteen regular-season games, he tallied 3 interceptions and 32 tackles. In the first round of the playoffs, the SaberCats faced off against the Spokane Shock. During the game, Hyland intercepted eventual teammate Erik Meyer; he returned the intercepted ball thirty yards in a 55-28 SaberCats victory. The SaberCats, however, would lose to the defending champion Arizona Rattlers one week later.

In the 2015 regular season, Hyland recorded 4 interceptions and 76 tackles for the SaberCats. In the 2015 playoffs, the SaberCats advanced to ArenaBowl XXVIII; there, Hyland forced two crucial turnovers against the opposing Jacksonville Sharks. Near the end of the third quarter, with the SaberCats holding a razor-thin 34–33 edge, Hyland intercepted Sharks quarterback (and former Blaze teammate) Tommy Grady deep in Jacksonville territory and returned it back for a touchdown to take a 41–33 lead. Minutes later, Hyland caught a kick that had deflected off the net; in running the ball in for a touchdown, he extended the SaberCats' lead to 55–33. The SaberCats would go on to win the game by a score of 68–47. For his efforts, Hyland was named the Defensive Player of the Game, and Iron Man of the Game.

Hyland was also awarded the 2015 AL Lucas AFL Pulse Hero Award for his off-field activities. The award "is presented annually to the player who makes the most significant contribution to both his community and the game of Arena Football."

On November 5, 2015, Hyland was assigned to the SaberCats for 2016.

On March 10, 2016, Hyland was assigned to the Jacksonville Sharks.

On July 18, 2018, Hyland was assigned to the Baltimore Brigade.
