= Jeff Maddux =

American football player (born 1988)

No. 66
- Position: Offensive lineman

Personal information
- Born: August 6, 1988 (age 38); Monroe, Michigan, U.S.
- Listed height: 6 ft 4 in (1.93 m)
- Listed weight: 315 lb (143 kg)

Career information
- High school: Monroe
- College: Central Michigan
- NFL draft: 2010: undrafted

Career history
- Cleveland Gladiators (2011); Detroit Lions (2012)*; Chicago Rush (2013); Arizona Rattlers (2014); San Jose SaberCats (2015)
- * Offseason or practice squad member only

Awards and highlights
- 2× ArenaBowl champion (2014, 2015)

Career AFL statistics
- Receptions: 1
- Receiving yards: 11
- Receiving TDs: 0
- Tackles: 1
- Stats at ArenaFan.com

Jeff Maddux (born August 6, 1988) is an American former professional football offensive lineman. He played football at Monroe High School in Monroe, Michigan; following his graduation, he attended Central Michigan University from 2006 to 2010. Maddux saw ample playing time during his tenure at Central Michigan; over four seasons with the Chippewas, he started some 47 games as an offensive guard.

Following his graduation from Central Michigan University, Maddux joined the Arena Football League's Cleveland Gladiators. He made his AFL debut in 2011; during that campaign, he appeared in six games for Cleveland. Maddux was then invited to the Detroit Lions' training camp. An ankle injury ended his quest to make the Lions' roster; following this setback, Maddux rejoined the Gladiators. In 2012, Maddux appeared in thirteen games for the Gladiators. In 2013, he joined the Chicago Rush (where he started all eighteen games); the club folded at the end of the season. In 2014, he debuted for the defending champion Arizona Rattlers. Maddux only appeared in nine games with the Rattlers after suffering a knee injury that would end his season; he did, however, pick up his first AFL championship when the Rattlers won ArenaBowl XXVII. Following this, Maddux was assigned to the rival San Jose SaberCats on January 28, 2015. He saw significant playing time during the 2015 season; notably, Maddux won his second AFL championship in as many years when the SaberCats defeated the Jacksonville Sharks in ArenaBowl XXVIII.
