= 2015 Orlando Predators season =

Arena Football League team season

- Owner: David A. Siegel
- General manager: Michael DiJulio
- Head coach: Rob Keefe
- Home stadium: Amway Center

Results
- Record: 12–6
- Division place: 1st AC South
- Playoffs: Lost Conference Semifinal (Sharks) 33-55

The 2015 Orlando Predators season was the twenty-fourth season for the franchise in the Arena Football League. The team was coached by Rob Keefe and played their home games at the Amway Center. The Predators improved to a 12-6 record and won the South division for the second straight year.

== Standings ==
2015 American Conference standings
Team	Overall			Points			Records			
Team	W	L	T	PCT	PF	PA	DIV	CON	Home	Away
East Division
^{(1)} Philadelphia Soul	15	3	0	.833	1060	823	6–0	11–3	9–0	6–3
^{(4)} Cleveland Gladiators	8	10	0	.444	953	959	3–3	6–8	3–6	5–4
New Orleans VooDoo	3	14	1	.194	692	919	0–6	2–12	3–6	0–8–1
South Division
^{(2)} Orlando Predators	12	6	0	.667	1023	951	5–1	10–4	7–2	5–4
^{(3)} Jacksonville Sharks	10	8	0	.556	971	901	2–4	8–6	7–2	3–6
Tampa Bay Storm	7	11	0	.389	820	942	2–4	5–9	5–4	2–7

== Schedule ==
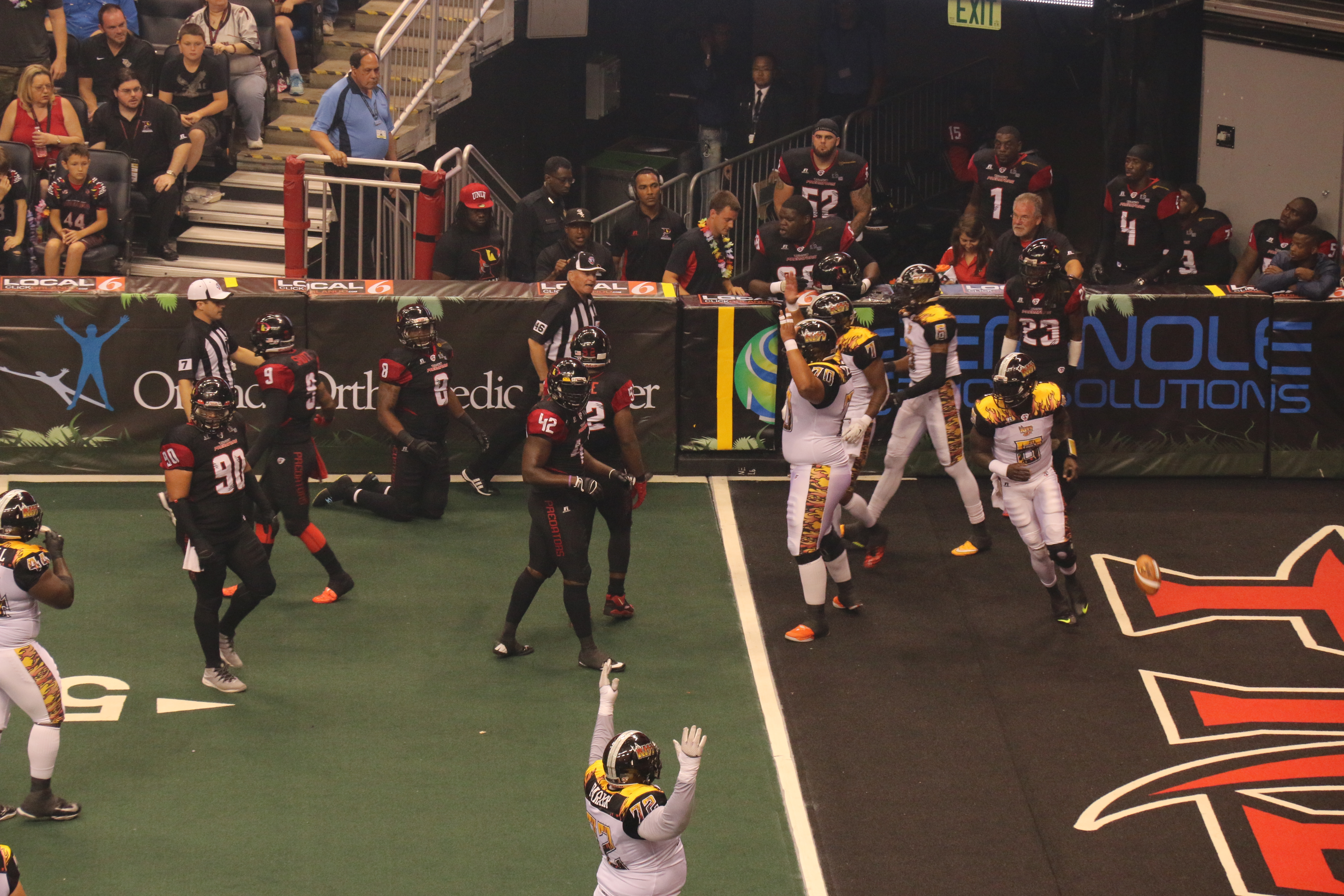
The Predators playing the Los Angeles Kiss on April 18

=== Regular season ===
The 2015 regular season schedule was released on December 19, 2014.

Week	Day	Date	Kickoff	Opponent	Results		Location	Attendance	Report
Week	Day	Date	Kickoff	Opponent	Score	Record	Location	Attendance	Report
1	Sunday	March 29	2:00 p.m. EDT	Philadelphia Soul	L 63–70	0–1	Amway Center	12,765	
2	Friday	April 3	8:00 p.m. EDT	at Jacksonville Sharks	W 55–54	1–1	Jacksonville Veterans Memorial Arena	8,741	
3	Saturday	April 11	8:00 p.m. EDT	at New Orleans VooDoo	W 47–42	2–1	Smoothie King Center	3,206	
4	Saturday	April 18	7:00 p.m. EDT	Los Angeles KISS	W 61–48	3–1	Amway Center	11,218	
5	Saturday	April 25	10:00 p.m. EDT	at Spokane Shock	L 55–56 (OT)	3–2	Spokane Veterans Memorial Arena	8,906	
6	Saturday	May 2	7:00 p.m. EDT	Cleveland Gladiators	L 55–56 (OT)	3–3	Amway Center	9,212	
7	Friday	May 8	7:30 p.m. EDT	at Philadelphia Soul	L 48–62	3–4	Wells Fargo Center	8,633	
8	Saturday	May 16	7:00 p.m. EDT	Tampa Bay Storm	W 63–62 (OT)	4–4	Amway Center	10,973	
9	Saturday	May 23	7:00 p.m. EDT	Portland Thunder	W 69–43	5–4	Amway Center	10,583	
10	Friday	May 29	7:00 p.m. EDT	at Cleveland Gladiators	W 63–42	6–4	Quicken Loans Arena	10,670	
11	Saturday	June 6	7:00 p.m. EDT	at Jacksonville Sharks	L 51–66	6–5	Jacksonville Veterans Memorial Arena	10,127	
12	Saturday	June 13	7:00 p.m. EDT	Philadelphia Soul	W 45–42	7–5	Amway Center	10,473	
13	Saturday	June 20	9:00 p.m. EDT	at Arizona Rattlers	L 35–55	7–6	Talking Stick Resort Arena	11,673	
14	Saturday	June 27	7:00 p.m. EDT	New Orleans VooDoo	W 56–43	8–6	Amway Center	10,536	
15	Bye								
16	Saturday	July 11	7:30 p.m. EDT	at Tampa Bay Storm	W 69–62	9–6	Amalie Arena	15,835	
17	Saturday	July 18	7:00 p.m. EDT	at Cleveland Gladiators	W 65–58	10–6	Quicken Loans Arena	13,186	
18	Bye								
19	Saturday	August 1	7:00 p.m. EDT	Jacksonville Sharks	W 64–50	11–6	Amway Center	12,184	
20	Saturday	August 8	7:00 p.m. EDT	Tampa Bay Storm	W 59–40	12–6	Amway Center	15,188	

=== Playoffs ===
Round	Day	Date	Kickoff	Opponent	Results	Location	Attendance	Report
AC Semifinals	Saturday	August 15	7:30 p.m. EDT	Jacksonville Sharks	L 33–55	Amway Center	11,459	

== Roster ==
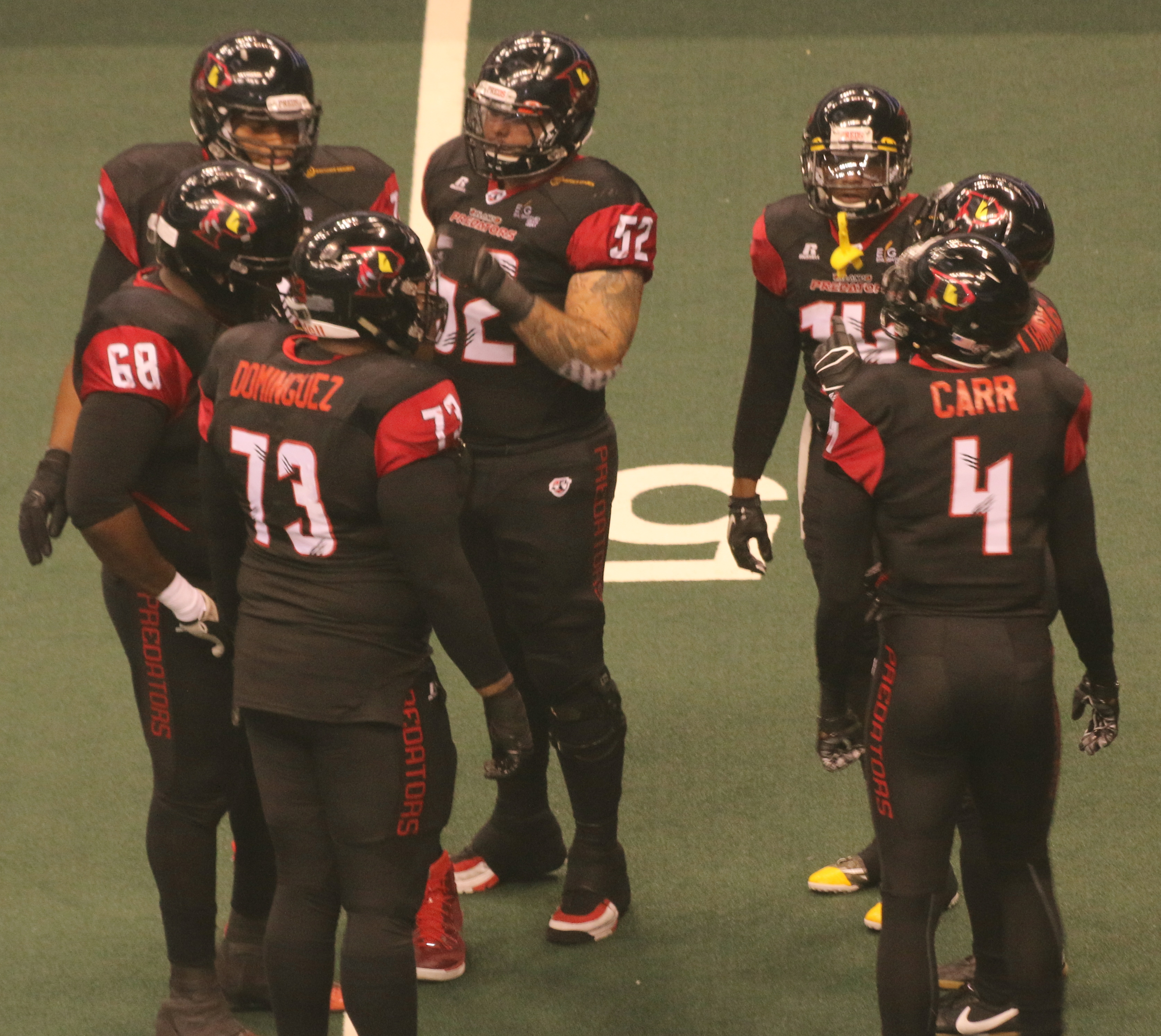
The Predators on April 18

2015 Orlando Predators roster
Quarterbacks: 12 Randy Hippeard; 5 Bernard Morris; Fullbacks: Currently vacant; Wide receivers: 1 Larry Brackins; 13 LaMark Brown; 4 Greg Carr; 11 Derrick Hector; 14 Brandon Thompkins; 15 Kendal Thompkins	Offensive linemen: 68 Ryan Cave; 75 Hayworth Hicks; 51 Will Maxwell; 52 Michael Simons; Defensive linemen: 90 Austin Brown; 92 Calvin Fance; 6 Jeremy Geathers; 44 Toby Jackson; 55 Monte Lewis; 42 Meshak Williams	Linebackers: 5 Terence Moore; Defensive backs: 26 Emanuel Cook; 24 Rod Issac; 3 Paul Stephens; 32 Nick Taylor; Kickers: 7 Garrett Lindholm	Injured reserve: -- Courtney Gardner WR; 18 Mark Lewis K; 11 Aaron Robbins LB; 9 Anthony Shutt DB; 16 Brian Smith DB; 11 Brian Zbydniewski QB; Other league exempt: -- Brandon Copeland DL; -- T. J. Fatinikun LB; 78 Erle Ladson OL; -- Earl Okine DL; -- Khalil Paden WR; League suspension: -- Justin Anderson OL; -- A. J. Dalton OL; 24 O'Hara Fluellen DB; 10 Justin Hilton WR; 17 Edward Mosley DL; 16 Christian Reed K; 44 Mark Robinson DL; Refused to report: -- Marc Dile OL; -- Arthur Hobbs DB; Inactive reserve: 2 Arness Ikner DB; 10 Julian Williams WR; Recallable reassignment: Currently vacant; Rookies in italics Roster updated August 14, 2015; 24 Active, 21 Inactive → More rosters
