= Kenny Okoro =

American football player (born 1989)

No. 24, 40
- Position: Cornerback

Personal information
- Born: October 18, 1989 (age 37); Greensboro, North Carolina, U.S.
- Listed height: 6 ft 1 in (1.85 m)
- Listed weight: 190 lb (86 kg)

Career information
- High school: James B. Dudley (Greensboro)
- College: Wake Forest
- NFL draft: 2013: undrafted

Career history
- San Diego Chargers (2013)*; San Jose SaberCats (2014); Washington Redskins (2014); San Jose SaberCats (2015)
- * Offseason or practice squad member only

Awards and highlights
- ArenaBowl champion (2015)

Career NFL statistics
- Total tackles: 1
- Stats at Pro Football Reference

Career AFL statistics
- Total tackles: 61.5
- Pass deflections: 8
- Interceptions: 2
- Stats at ArenaFan.com

Chibuikem Kenneth Okoro (born October 18, 1989) is an American former professional football player who was a cornerback in the National Football League (NFL). He played college football for the Wake Forest Demon Deacons and attended James B. Dudley High School in Greensboro, North Carolina. He was a member of the San Diego Chargers, San Jose SaberCats and Washington Redskins. His name Chibuikem means "God is my power" in Igbo.

== Early life ==
Okoro's parents are both Nigerian immigrants. He played high school football for the James B. Dudley High School Panthers. He was the Greensboro News and Record All-Area Player of the Year as a senior and a member of the NCPreps.com 3A All-State team. Okoro was an honor roll student all four years of high school.

== College career ==
Okoro played for the Wake Forest Demon Deacons from 2009 to 2012. He was redshirted in 2008. He started 37 games for the Demon Deacons, recording seven interceptions.

== Professional career ==
=== San Diego Chargers ===
Okoro was signed by the San Diego Chargers on April 27, 2013 after going undrafted in the 2013 NFL draft. He was waived-injured by the Chargers on July 30.

=== San Jose SaberCats ===
Okoro spent the 2014 Arena Football League season with the San Jose SaberCats. He recorded 60 tackles and an interception in 11 games with the SaberCats. Okoro was placed on Other League Exempt on December 2, 2014.

=== Washington Redskins ===
Okoro was signed to the Washington Redskins' practice squad on November 26, 2014. He was promoted to the active roster on December 6. Okoro made his NFL debut on December 7, against the St. Louis Rams. On May 4, 2015, he was waived by the Redskins.

=== San Jose SaberCats (second stint) ===
On May 6, 2015, the SaberCats activated Okoro from Other League Exempt. The Sabercats won ArenaBowl XXVIII against the Jacksonville Sharks on August 29. He became a free agent after the 2015 season.
