= Mike Willie =

American gridiron football player (born 1990)

Michael Willie
No. 21
- Position: Wide receiver

Personal information
- Born: June 17, 1990 (age 36); Compton, California, U.S.
- Listed height: 6 ft 2 in (1.88 m)
- Listed weight: 220 lb (100 kg)

Career information
- High school: Wilson (Long Beach, California)
- College: Arizona State
- NFL draft: 2012: undrafted

Career history
- San Diego Chargers (2012); Baltimore Ravens (2014)*; San Jose SaberCats (2015); Winnipeg Blue Bombers (2015); Los Angeles KISS (2016)
- * Offseason or practice squad member only

Awards and highlights
- ArenaBowl champion (2015)
- Stats at Pro Football Reference
- Stats at CFL.ca (archive)
- Stats at ArenaFan.com

Michael Willie (born June 17, 1990) is an American former professional football player who was a wide receiver in the National Football League (NFL). He was signed as an undrafted free agent by the San Diego Chargers in 2012. He played college football for the Arizona State Sun Devils.

== Early life ==
Willie attended Woodrow Wilson Classical High School in Long Beach, California. He was named to the All-CIF and All-Moore League teams. He had 700 receiving yards and six receiving touchdowns in his senior season in high school.

== College career ==
Willie attended Cerritos College out of high school, where he continued his football career. While at Cerritos, Willie had some of the highest receiving totals in California.

In his two seasons at Arizona State University, Willie had 72 receptions, 897 receiving yards and 9 receiving touchdowns.

== Professional career ==
In 2012, Willie signed with the San Diego Chargers to join the practice squad. On August 27, 2013, he was placed on the reserve/injured list. On August 31, 2013, he was waived with an injury settlement.

The Baltimore Ravens signed Willie after a successful minicamp tryout on June 20, 2014. The Ravens released Willie on August 25, 2014.

On July 20, 2015, Willie was assigned to the San Jose SaberCats of the Arena Football League.

On August 23, 2015, Willie was signed to the practise roster of the Winnipeg Blue Bombers of the Canadian Football League. On September 29, 2015, he was released.

On March 10, 2016, Willie was assigned to the Los Angeles KISS. On May 14, 2016, Willie was placed on reassignment. On May 18, 2016, Willie was assigned to the KISS once again.
