= Arena Football League Offensive Player of the Year =

The Arena Football League Offensive Player of the Year was an award given annually by the Arena Football League (AFL) to the offensive player of the AFL believed to have had the most outstanding season. Multiple-award winners include Eddie Brown, Aaron Garcia, Chris Jackson and Damian Harrell whom won the award two times each. As of the 2015 season, the most recent winner is Dan Raudabaugh of the Philadelphia Soul.

Season	Player	AFL team	Position
1996	Eddie Brown	Albany Firebirds	WR/DB
1997	Barry Wagner	Orlando Predators	WR/DB
1998	Calvin Schexnayder	Arizona Rattlers	WR/LB
1999	Eddie Brown (2)	Albany Firebirds	WR/DB
2000	Mike Horacek	Iowa Barnstormers	WR/LB
2001	Aaron Garcia	New York Dragons	QB
2002	Mark Grieb	San Jose SaberCats	QB
2003	Chris Jackson	Los Angeles Avengers	WR
2004	Marcus Nash	Las Vegas Gladiators	WR/LB
2005	Damian Harrell	Colorado Crush	WR
2006	Damian Harrell (2)	Colorado Crush	WR
2007	Siaha Burley	Utah Blaze	WR/DB
2008	Chris Jackson (2)	Philadelphia Soul	WR
2010	Chris Greisen	Milwaukee Iron	QB
2011	Aaron Garcia (2)	Jacksonville Sharks	QB
2012	Tommy Grady	Utah Blaze	QB
2013	Erik Meyer	Spokane Shock	QB
2014	Nick Davila	Arizona Rattlers	QB
2015	Dan Raudabaugh	Philadelphia Soul	QB
2016	Joe Hills	Jacksonville Sharks	WR
2017	Randy Hippeard	Tampa Bay Storm	QB
2018	Tommy Grady (2)	Albany Empire	QB
2019	Malachi Jones	Albany Empire	WR
