= Keon Lyn =

American gridiron football player (born 1992)

No. 29, 39
- Position: Cornerback

Personal information
- Born: March 5, 1992 (age 34); Miami, Florida, U.S.
- Listed height: 6 ft 1 in (1.85 m)
- Listed weight: 205 lb (93 kg)

Career information
- High school: Miramar (Miramar, Florida)
- College: Syracuse
- NFL draft: 2014: undrafted

Career history
- Indianapolis Colts (2014)*; Winnipeg Blue Bombers (2015)*; Jacksonville Sharks (2015); New York Jets (2015)*; Tampa Bay Buccaneers (2015)*; Jacksonville Sharks (2016); Hamilton Tiger-Cats (2017–2018); BC Lions (2018–2019); Edmonton Eskimos (2019)*; BC Lions (2020)*
- * Offseason or practice squad member only

Career AFL statistics
- Tackles: 19.5
- Pass deflections: 5
- Forced fumbles: 2
- Stats at ArenaFan.com
- Stats at Pro Football Reference
- Stats at CFL.ca

Keondrick Louis Lyn (born March 5, 1992) is an American former professional football cornerback. He played college football at Syracuse. Lyn signed with the Indianapolis Colts as an undrafted free agent in 2014.

== Early life ==
Keondrick Louis Lyn was born on March 5, 1992, in Miami, Florida. He attended Miramar High School in Miramar, Florida, where he helped lead his high school football team to a state championship in his senior season in 2009. Lyn was named a 2009 Broward County All-Star. Lyn recorded 119 tackles and five interceptions, including returning one for a touchdown in his senior season. Lyn also participated in track & field.

== College career ==
Lyn was a four-year letterman for the Syracuse Orange from 2010 to 2013. He majored in communication and rhetorical studies at Syracuse. He only played in five games (all starts) his senior year due to injury. Lyn finished his college career with totals of 75 solo tackles, 14 assisted tackles, three interceptions for 32 yards and one touchdown, three pass breakups, one sack, and two forced fumbles.

== Professional career ==
=== Indianapolis Colts ===
In May 2014, Lyn signed with the Indianapolis Colts as an undrafted free agent following the 2014 NFL draft. On June 3, 2014, Lyn was waived by the Colts.

=== Winnipeg Blue Bombers ===
On April 16, 2015, Lyn signed with the Winnipeg Blue Bombers of the Canadian Football League (CFL). He was released on April 30, 2015.

=== Jacksonville Sharks (first stint) ===
On July 16, 2015, Lyn signed with the Jacksonville Sharks of the Arena Football League. Lyn only played in one game with the Sharks.

=== New York Jets ===
On August 7, 2015, Lyn signed with the New York Jets. He was waived on September 5, and signed to the Jets' practice squad on September 7. He was later released on September 30.

=== Tampa Bay Buccaneers ===
Lyn was signed to the practice squad of the Tampa Bay Buccaneers on October 20, 2015. He was released on October 27, 2015.

=== Jacksonville Sharks (second stint) ===
Lyn participated in rookie minicamp on a tryout basis with the Washington Redskins in May 2016. On May 19, 2016, the Sharks activated Lyn from the other league exempt list. He posted six solo tackles, 27 assisted tackles, two forced fumbles, and four pass breakups for Jacksonville during the 2016 season.

=== Hamilton Tiger-Cats ===
Lyn signed with the CFL's Hamilton Tiger-Cats on January 16, 2017. He played in two games, both starts, for Hamilton during the 2017 season. He was released on May 10, 2018.

=== BC Lions (first stint) ===
Lyn signed with the BC Lions of the CFL in September 2018. He dressed in one game for the Lions during the 2018 season. He re-signed with the Lions on July 3, 2019. Lyn was released during final roster cuts on June 8, 2019, and signed to the team's practice roster. He was released from the practice roster on July 23, 2019.

=== Edmonton Eskimos ===
Lyn signed with the Edmonton Eskimos' practice roster on November 5, 2019.

=== BC Lions (second stint) ===
Lyn re-signed with the Lions on January 14, 2020. He was released on January 5, 2021.
