= Dallas Vigilantes =

Arena football team

Logo

General information
- Founded: 2009
- Folded: 2011
- Headquartered: American Airlines Center in Dallas, Texas
- Colors: Black, cardinal, white
- Mascot: Rascal the Raccoon

Personnel
- Owners: Peter “Woody” Kern, Bo Kern
- Head coach: Clint Dolezel

Team history
- Dallas Vigilantes (2010–2011)

Home fields
- American Airlines Center (2010–2011)

League / conference affiliations
- Arena Football League (2010–2011): National Conference (2010–2011); Western Division (2010–2011)

Playoff appearances (0)
- 1 2011

The Dallas Vigilantes were an Arena Football League (AFL) team based in Dallas, Texas. Like its AFL predecessor, the Dallas Desperados, the Vigilantes played at the American Airlines Center. The Vigilantes and the Jacksonville Sharks began play in the 2010 season, the first after the league's restructuring. The franchise was owned by former Tampa Bay Storm owner Peter C. Kern and was managed by Stephen Evans. Vigilantes games were broadcast on the radio on 1190 AM and television coverage was provided by Time Warner Cable Sports.

== History ==
The Vigilantes did not carry on the name of Dallas' previous AFL team, the Dallas Desperados, because of a unique ownership situation with the former team. Although the new AFL owns the former AFL team assets (hence the Arizona Rattlers, Chicago Rush, Cleveland Gladiators, Orlando Predators, Tampa Bay Storm, and Utah Blaze names going over to the new AF1), former Desperados owner Jerry Jones (who also owns the NFL's Dallas Cowboys) retained the team's branding rights after it folded. Jones had based most of the Desperados branding on that of the Cowboys, including the colors, prominent use of a star in the logo, and a Cowboys "Double Star" logo on the front of the Desperados' jerseys, thus making the Cowboys and Desperados branding very difficult to separate. Not willing to risk such complicated legal action, and apparently unwilling to revive the Fort Worth Cavalry (another former AFL team that played in the region that coincidentally was owned by Kern), the Vigilantes chose a new name. The Vigilantes' original logo incorporated a skull and crossbones, the flag of Texas, a cowboy hat, and revolvers. The logo was stripped down for 2011, consisting of the skull and the cowboy hat from the original logo.

The Vigilantes were left off the schedule for the 2012 season without any announcement of either the team's suspension or cessation of operations, but have never been involved in any aspect of the Arena Football League subsequently and are considered to be defunct.

== Season-by-season ==
ArenaBowl champions	ArenaBowl appearance	Division champions	Playoff berth

Season	Team	League	Conference	Division	Regular season			Postseason results
Season	Team	League	Conference	Division	Finish	Wins	Losses	Postseason results
Dallas Vigilantes
2010	2010	AFL	American	Southwest	3rd	3	13	
2011	2011	AFL	National	Central	2nd	11	7	Lost Conference Semifinals (Chicago) 51–54
Total						14	20	(includes only regular season)
Total						0	1	(includes only the postseason)
Total						14	21	(includes both regular season and postseason)

== Players of note ==
=== Individual awards ===
Receiver of the Year
Season	Player	Position
2011	Tiger Jones	WR

=== All-Arena players ===
The following Vigilantes players were named to All-Arena Teams:

- FB Derrick Ross (1)
- WR Tiger Jones (1)
- OL Phil Bogle (1)
- DL Dusty Bear (1)

=== All-Ironman players ===
The following Vigilantes players were named to All-Ironman Teams:

- WR/KR King Franklin (1)
