= Reggie Gray =

American football player (born 1984)

No. 1, 3
- Position: Wide receiver

Personal information
- Born: April 29, 1984 (age 42); Chicago, Illinois, U.S.
- Listed height: 5 ft 11 in (1.80 m)
- Listed weight: 170 lb (77 kg)

Career information
- High school: Morgan Park (Chicago)
- College: Western Illinois
- NFL draft: 2006: undrafted

Career history
- Bloomington Extreme (2006–2007); Chicago Rush (2008)*; Peoria Pirates (2008); Chicago Slaughter (2009–2010); Tampa Bay Storm (2010)*; Chicago Rush (2011–2013); San Jose SaberCats (2014–2015); Jacksonville Sharks (2016); Qingdao Clipper (2016); Baltimore Brigade (2017); Washington Valor (2018–2019)
- * Offseason or practice squad member only

Awards and highlights
- 2× ArenaBowl champion (2015, 2018); ArenaBowl MVP (2015); First Team All-Arena (2015); 4× Second-team All-Arena (2011, 2012, 2013, 2018); AFL Playmaker of the Year (2013); AFL Wide Receiver of the Year (2015); AFL All-Ironman Team – WR/KR (2011); CAFL All-Pro North Division All-Star (2016)

Career AFL statistics
- Receptions: 854
- Receiving yards: 10,621
- Receiving touchdowns: 260
- Return yards: 5,682
- Return touchdowns: 15
- Stats at ArenaFan.com

Reggie Gray (born April 29, 1984) is an American former football wide receiver and kickoff returner who played in the Arena Football League (AFL).

== Early life ==
Gray attended Morgan Park High School in Chicago, Illinois, where he was a team captain and led his team to the 2001 City Championship, in which they defeated Dunbar in a shootout. He scored the game-winning touchdown on a 45-yard bomb with 41 seconds left in the game. He was an All-State wide receiver, defensive back, and kick returner. He amassed over 2000 all purpose yards, with 25 touchdowns. Had 10 returned kicks for touchdowns, and intercepted 10 passes.

== College career ==
In college, Reggie played receiver for the Western Illinois Leathernecks, wearing jersey #85.

== Professional career ==
=== Bloomington Extreme ===
Reggie played two seasons for the Bloomington Extreme before signing a contract on February 8, 2008 with the Chicago Rush of the Arena Football League. The Extreme were associated with the league known as United Indoor Football until the autumn of 2008 when that league joined with the Intense Football League to form the newest incarnation of the Indoor Football League.

=== Chicago Rush ===
Reggie was a member of the Chicago Rush during the 2008 off-season, failing to make the Rush roster.

=== Chicago Slaughter ===
With the Chicago Rush shut down by the AFL's decision to suspend its season, Gray joined several of his Rush team members in a move to the Chicago Slaughter of the rival Continental Indoor Football League. During that season, he led the league in all-purpose yards with 1,318. The Slaughter went undefeated, winning the 2009 CIFL Championship Game 58–48 over the Fort Wayne Freedom. Gray had a 46-yard kickoff return for a touchdown.

Gray returned to the Slaughter in 2010 after being cut by the Tampa Bay Storm. The Slaughter moved to the larger Indoor Football League in 2010.

=== Chicago Rush ===
Gray signed with the Chicago Rush for the 2011 Arena Football League season. He was reunited with college teammate Russ Michna and in his first year on the regular roster, Gray caught 130 passes for 1,969 yards and 49 receiving touchdowns. With 4 more kickoff returns for touchdowns, Gray finished the year with 53 total touchdowns. The receptions and receiving yards broke Bobby Sippio's Rush franchise records. Gray was voted on Second Team All-Arena and made the All-Ironman Team as a WR/KR. Following the 2013 season. Gray was named a second team All-Arena selection for the 3rd time in his career.

=== San Jose SaberCats ===
On September 11, 2013, Gray was assigned to the San Jose SaberCats. He was named the ArenaBowl MVP when San Jose won the ArenaBowl in 2015.

=== Jacksonville Sharks ===
On May 31, 2016, Gray was assigned to the Jacksonville Sharks.

=== Qingdao Clipper ===
Gray was selected by the Qingdao Clipper of the China Arena Football League (CAFL) in the ninth round of the 2016 CAFL draft. He earned All-Pro North Division All-Star honors after catching 42 passes for 691 yards and 13 touchdowns. He is listed on the Clipper's roster for the 2018 season.

=== Baltimore Brigade ===
Gray was assigned to the Baltimore Brigade in January 2017.

=== Washington Valor ===
On March 30, 2018, he was assigned to the Washington Valor. On April 24, 2019, Gray was assigned to the Valor once again.
