= 2015 Tampa Bay Storm season =

Arena Football League team season

- Owner: Jeffrey Vinik
- Head coach: Lawrence Samuels
- Home stadium: Amalie Arena

Results
- Record: 7–11
- Division place: 3rd AC South
- Playoffs: Did not qualify

The 2015 Tampa Bay Storm season was the twenty-seventh season for the franchise in the Arena Football League. The team was coached by Lawrence Samuels and played their home games at the Amalie Arena. The Storm finished the regular season 7–11, and for the second consecutive season, failed to reach the playoffs.

== Standings ==
2015 American Conference standings
Team	Overall			Points			Records			
Team	W	L	T	PCT	PF	PA	DIV	CON	Home	Away
East Division
^{(1)} Philadelphia Soul	15	3	0	.833	1060	823	6–0	11–3	9–0	6–3
^{(4)} Cleveland Gladiators	8	10	0	.444	953	959	3–3	6–8	3–6	5–4
New Orleans VooDoo	3	14	1	.194	692	919	0–6	2–12	3–6	0–8–1
South Division
^{(2)} Orlando Predators	12	6	0	.667	1023	951	5–1	10–4	7–2	5–4
^{(3)} Jacksonville Sharks	10	8	0	.556	971	901	2–4	8–6	7–2	3–6
Tampa Bay Storm	7	11	0	.389	820	942	2–4	5–9	5–4	2–7

== Schedule ==
=== Regular season ===
The 2015 regular season schedule was released on December 19, 2014.

Week	Day	Date	Kickoff	Opponent	Results		Location	Attendance	Report
Week	Day	Date	Kickoff	Opponent	Score	Record	Location	Attendance	Report
1	Friday	March 27	7:30 p.m. EDT	Cleveland Gladiators	L 44–60	0–1	Amalie Arena	9,727	
2	Friday	April 3	10:00 p.m. EDT	at Portland Thunder	W 54–48	1–1	Moda Center	5,098	
3	Friday	April 10	7:30 p.m. EDT	San Jose SaberCats	L 27–36	1–2	Amalie Arena	8,588	
4	Friday	April 17	7:30 p.m. EDT	New Orleans VooDoo	W 42–13	2–2	Amalie Arena	9,122	
5	Friday	April 24	7:00 p.m. EDT	at Cleveland Gladiators	L 54–62	2–3	Quicken Loans Arena	11,120	
6	Saturday	May 2	7:30 p.m. EDT	Jacksonville Sharks	W 63–28	3–3	Amalie Arena	11,121	
7	Bye								
8	Saturday	May 16	7:00 p.m. EDT	at Orlando Predators	L 62–63 (OT)	3–4	Amway Center	10,973	
9	Saturday	May 23	7:30 p.m. EDT	Philadelphia Soul	L 27–71	3–5	Amalie Arena	13,921	
10	Saturday	May 30	7:30 p.m. EDT	New Orleans VooDoo	W 35–34	4–5	Amalie Arena	13,581	
11	Saturday	June 6	9:00 p.m. EDT	at Arizona Rattlers	L 46–69	4–6	Talking Stick Resort Arena	12,304	
12	Friday	June 12	7:30 p.m. EDT	Jacksonville Sharks	W 63–56	5–6	Amalie Arena	12,602	
13	Friday	June 19	7:00 p.m. EDT	at Cleveland Gladiators	W 52–48	6–6	Quicken Loans Arena	10,123	
14	Friday	June 26	7:30 p.m. EDT	at Philadelphia Soul	L 42–64	6–7	Wells Fargo Center	8,214	
15	Bye								
16	Saturday	July 11	7:30 p.m. EDT	Orlando Predators	L 62–69	6–8	Amalie Arena	15,835	
17	Saturday	July 18	8:00 p.m. EDT	at New Orleans VooDoo	L 53–65	6–9	Smoothie King Center	5,888	
18	Saturday	July 25	7:00 p.m. EDT	at Jacksonville Sharks	L 16–63	6–10	Jacksonville Veterans Memorial Arena	13,092	
19	Saturday	August 1	7:30 p.m. EDT	Los Angeles KISS	W 38–34	7–10	Amalie Arena	16,308	
20	Saturday	August 8	7:00 p.m. EDT	at Orlando Predators	L 40–59	7–11	Amway Center	15,188	

== Roster ==
2015 Tampa Bay Storm roster
Quarterbacks: 16 Jason Boltus; 3 Luke Collis; Fullbacks: 45 Undra Hendrix; Wide receivers: 2 Julius Gregory; 17 Kendrick Ings; 13 Tristan Purifoy; 6 Emery Sammons; 1 T. T. Toliver	Offensive linemen: 73 Bruce Doyle; 50 Jermarcus Hardrick; 64 Travis Miller; 79 Ben Ossai; 71 Jeremy Schonbrunner; Defensive linemen: 92 Rony Barrow; 93 Richard Clebert; 94 Everett Dawkins; 90 Julius Forte; 91 Brandon Sesay; 97 David Washington	Linebackers: 55 Dexter Jackson; Defensive backs: 5 James Harrell; 23 Nick Addison; 26 Randall Burden; 14 Al Phillips; Kickers: 19 Craig Peterson	Injured reserve: 15 Phillip Barnett WR; 8 Rick-J Hill DB; 57 Byron Isom OL; 52 Alfred McCullough OL; 21 Tim Shelley DB; Inactive reserve: Currently vacant; League suspension: 54 Stanlee Bradley FB; 99 Ryne Giddins DL; 99 Ishmyl Johnson OL; 54 Rocco Manfre OL; Other league exempt: -- Cory Brandon OL; 97 Frank Mays DL; 73 Tyler Moore OL; Refuse to report: 75 Mario Henderson OL; Recallable reassignment: Currently vacant; Rookies in itlatics Roster updated August 6, 2015; 24 Active, 12 Inactive → More rosters
