= 2015 New Orleans VooDoo season =

Sports season

- General manager: Brandon Rizzuto
- Head coach: Dean Cokinos
- Home stadium: Smoothie King Center

Results
- Record: 3–14–1
- Division place: 3rd AC East
- Playoffs: Did not qualify

The 2015 New Orleans VooDoo season was the ninth and final season and for the franchise in the Arena Football League (AFL). The team was coached by Dean Cokinos and played their home games at the Smoothie King Center. The team finished the regular season last in the league at 3–14-1, with one game cancelled and regarded officially as a tie, and failed to qualify for the playoffs for a third straight season. Following the season, the AFL, which had operated the team as owners since July 15, announced that the VooDoo would cease operations effective immediately.

== Standings ==
2015 American Conference standings
Team	Overall			Points			Records			
Team	W	L	T	PCT	PF	PA	DIV	CON	Home	Away
East Division
^{(1)} Philadelphia Soul	15	3	0	.833	1060	823	6–0	11–3	9–0	6–3
^{(4)} Cleveland Gladiators	8	10	0	.444	953	959	3–3	6–8	3–6	5–4
New Orleans VooDoo	3	14	1	.194	692	919	0–6	2–12	3–6	0–8–1
South Division
^{(2)} Orlando Predators	12	6	0	.667	1023	951	5–1	10–4	7–2	5–4
^{(3)} Jacksonville Sharks	10	8	0	.556	971	901	2–4	8–6	7–2	3–6
Tampa Bay Storm	7	11	0	.389	820	942	2–4	5–9	5–4	2–7

== Schedule ==
=== Regular season ===
The 2015 regular season schedule was released on December 19, 2014.

Week	Day	Date	Kickoff	Opponent	Results		Location	Attendance	Report
Week	Day	Date	Kickoff	Opponent	Score	Record	Location	Attendance	Report
1	Saturday	March 28	8:00 p.m. EDT	Jacksonville Sharks	W 51–50	1–0	Smoothie King Center	3,833	
2	Saturday	April 4	8:00 p.m. EDT	Cleveland Gladiators	L 42–70	1–1	Smoothie King Center	3,818	
3	Saturday	April 11	8:00 p.m. EDT	Orlando Predators	L 42–47	1–2	Smoothie King Center	3,206	
4	Friday	April 17	7:30 p.m. EDT	at Tampa Bay Storm	L 13–42	1–3	Amalie Arena	9,122	
5	Saturday	April 25	8:00 p.m. EDT	Philadelphia Soul	L 42–55	1–4	Smoothie King Center	3,096	
6	Saturday	May 2	8:00 p.m. EDT	Spokane Shock	W 66–63	2–4	Smoothie King Center	3,785	
7	Saturday	May 9	8:00 p.m. EDT	Arizona Rattlers	L 39–47	2–5	Smoothie King Center	4,015	
8	Friday	May 15	7:00 p.m. EDT	at Cleveland Gladiators	L 42–64	2–6	Quicken Loans Arena	12,127	
9	Saturday	May 23	7:00 p.m. EDT	Jacksonville Sharks	L 41–70	2–7	Smoothie King Center	4,021	
10	Saturday	May 30	7:30 p.m. EDT	at Tampa Bay Storm	L 34–35	2–8	Amalie Arena	13,581	
11	Saturday	June 6	6:00 p.m. EDT	at Philadelphia Soul	L 41–62	2–9	Wells Fargo Center	8,197	
12	Friday	June 12	8:30 p.m. EDT	Cleveland Gladiators	L 34–51	2–10	Smoothie King Center	4,131	
13	Bye								
14	Saturday	June 27	7:00 p.m. EDT	at Orlando Predators	L 43–56	2–11	Amway Center	10,536	
15	Bye								
16	Friday	July 10	10:30 p.m. EDT	at San Jose SaberCats	L 35–56	2–12	SAP Center at San Jose	9,321	
17	Saturday	July 18	8:00 p.m. EDT	Tampa Bay Storm	W 65–53	3–12	Smoothie King Center	5,888	
18	Saturday	July 25	10:30 p.m. EDT	at Las Vegas Outlaws	Game canceled. Result is considered a tie.				
19	Sunday	August 2	4:00 p.m. EDT	at Philadelphia Soul	L 28–61	3–13–1	Wells Fargo Center	10,018	
20	Saturday	August 8	7:00 p.m. EDT	at Jacksonville Sharks	L 33–36	3–14–1	Jacksonville Veterans Memorial Arena	11,486	

== Final roster ==
2015 New Orleans VooDoo final roster
Quarterbacks: 5 Adam Kennedy; 9 Kasey Peters; Fullbacks: 33 R. J. Bibbs; Wide receivers: 17 Chris Duvalt; 13 Kayne Farquharson; 19 Roger Jackson; 18 Johnny Lester; 3 Charles McClain	Offensive linemen: 50 Richard Muldrow; 70 Carnell Stewart; 55 Isaiah Tuiasosopo; Defensive linemen: 15 Caleb Bostic; 11 Kwame Jordan; 56 James McClinton; 92 Benji McDowell; 4 Dominie Pittman; 2 Jeremiah Price	Linebackers: 44 Roosevelt Falls; Defensive backs: 6 Tracy Belton; 20 Cameron McGlenn; 1 Cortez Stubbs; 8 Seth Williams; Kickers: 22 T. C. Stevens	Injured reserve: 53 Kevin Ashak FB/OL; 72 Leonardo Bates OL; 9 Jeremy Grier LB; Other league exempt: -- A. C. Leonard WR; League suspension: -- Xavier Brown DL; 75 Josh Downs DL; -- Gavin Farr OL; -- Anthony Grady DL; -- B. J. Hall QB; 77 Brandon Heath OL; 18 Will Johnson LB; 3 Garrett Lindholm K; 90 Jordan Miller DL; -- Chip Reeves WR; -- Quentin Saulsberry OL; -- Lamaar Thomas WR; -- Malcolm Williams DB; Refused to report: -- Brelan Chancellor WR; -- Thaddeus Coleman OL; Inactive reserve: 21 Boubacar Cissoko DB; 12 Brian Reader QB; Recallable reassignment: Currently vacant; Rookies in italics Roster updated July 28, 2015; 23 Active, 21 Inactive → More rosters

== Final staff ==
New Orleans VooDoo staff
Front office: General manager/shareholder –; Director of operations –; Senior Ticket Sales Associate -; Season ticketing manager –; Director of pro player personnel –	Head coach: Head coach/offensive coordinator – Dean Cokinos; Offensive coaches: Offensive line – Ryan Lingenfelder; Defensive coaches: Defensive coordinator – Cosmo Dematteo; Defensive line – Ryan Lingenfelder; Support staff: Athletic trainer – Patrick Maloney; Equipment manager – Chad Rachal
