= Erik Meyer =

American gridiron football player (born 1982)

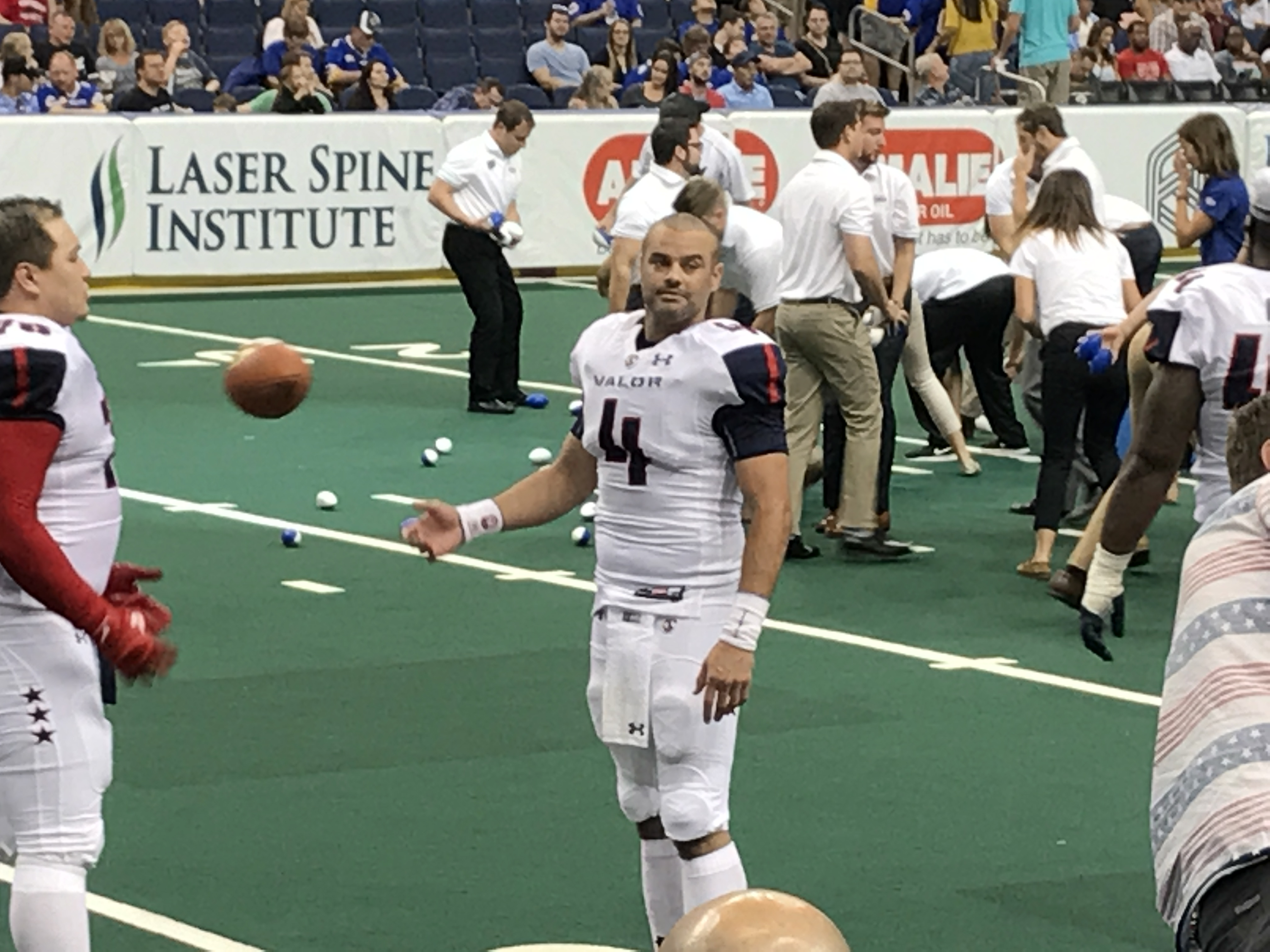
- Meyer with the Washington Valor in 2017

No. 9, 4
- Position: Quarterback

Personal information
- Born: December 28, 1982 (age 43); La Mirada, California, U.S.
- Listed height: 6 ft 1 in (1.85 m)
- Listed weight: 215 lb (98 kg)

Career information
- High school: La Mirada
- College: Eastern Washington
- NFL draft: 2006: undrafted

Career history

Playing
- Cincinnati Bengals (2006)*; Cologne Centurions (2007); Seattle Seahawks (2007)*; Oakland Raiders (2008)*; Hamilton Tiger-Cats (2009)*; Spokane Shock (2010); Utah Blaze (2011); Spokane Shock (2011–2014); San Jose SaberCats (2015); Washington Valor (2017)
- * Offseason or practice squad member only

Coaching
- Eastern Washington (2012) Assistant coach; Central Washington (2013) Quarterbacks coach; La Mirada HS (CA) (2008–2016) Quarterbacks coach; California (2017–2019) Offensive quality control coach; Cal Poly (2020–2023) Quarterbacks coach & passing game coordinator; Cal Poly (2024) Co-offensive coordinator & quarterbacks coach; St. Paul HS (CA) (2025–present) Offensive coordinator

Awards and highlights
- 2× ArenaBowl champion (2010, 2015); ArenaBowl Offensive Player of the Game (2015); AFL MVP (2013); AFL Offensive Player of the Year (2013); First-team All-Arena (2013); Second-team All-Arena (2015); AFL passing yards leader (2013); Walter Payton Award (2005)

Career AFL statistics
- Comp. / Att.: 1,214 / 1,821
- Passing yards: 13,904
- TD–INT: 312–37
- QB rating: 120.57
- Rushing TDs: 46
- Stats at ArenaFan.com

Erik Meyer (born December 28, 1982) is an American former professional football quarterback and current coach. He is the offensive coordinator for St. Paul High School in Santa Fe Springs, California, a position he has held since 2025. He was signed by the Cincinnati Bengals as an undrafted free agent in 2006. He played college football at Eastern Washington. He was also a member of the Cologne Centurions, Seattle Seahawks. Oakland Raiders, Utah Blaze, Hamilton Tiger-Cats, Spokane Shock, San Jose SaberCats, and Washington Valor.

== Early life ==
Meyer attended La Mirada High School in La Mirada, California, and was a student and a letterman in football and baseball. He was given the nickname of "Daddy" because he was always known to be a father figure to underclassmen, and his various positions in the community volunteering with children were highlighted at commencement when the school recognized him with the "George R. Shull Excellence in Care Scholarship," voted on by his graduating class and faculty at LMHS.

== College career ==
Meyer was a record-setting quarterback for Eastern Washington University. He won the 2005 Walter Payton Award, presented by The Sports Network to the top offensive player in NCAA Division I-AA football. In 42 games, he completed 721 of 1097 passes for 10,261 yards, with 84 TD passes against just 17 INTs. His 166.5 career passing efficiency rating set a record for FCS quarterbacks with at least 400 completions. His career interception percentage (1.5) also is a Division I-AA record. He also broke eight Eastern Washington career records, five single-season marks, and one single-game mark. Erik, an avid weight lifter, was the lone skill position player to be a member of the 1200 pound club as a member of the EWU football team. His diligence led him to be inducted into the inaugural Iron Man Club, a plaque small in stature coined by a small fan Joey Dank. It still is a prominent fixture in the Eagle weight facility in Cheney, WA. Notably, Meyer was recognized for excellence in the classroom during his four-year career at EWU. Erik was the recipient of the Joseph Helen Dankert Gold Scholar Award for maintaining a 3.8+ GPA during his time as an Eagle.

== Professional career ==
Meyer was rated the eighth best quarterback in the 2006 NFL draft by NFLDraftScout.com.

Pre-draft measurables
Height	Weight	40-yard dash	10-yard split	20-yard split	20-yard shuttle	Three-cone drill	Vertical jump	Broad jump	Wonderlic
6 ft 1 in (1.85 m)	210 lb (95 kg)	4.70 s	1.61 s	2.72 s	4.12 s	6.83 s	32 1/2 in (0.83 m)	9 ft 4 in (2.84 m)	18
All values from NFL Combine

=== Cincinnati Bengals ===
Meyer went undrafted in the 2006 NFL Draft. He signed with the Cincinnati Bengals as an undrafted free agent and attended training camp hoping to contend for a roster spot. Meyer was released from the Bengals on August 28.

=== Cologne Centurions ===
In 2007, Meyer was the starting quarterback for the Cologne Centurions of NFL Europa before the league folded. He completed 141 of 205 passes for 1,612 yards, 13 touchdowns and 6 interceptions. He also rushed for 138 yards and 1 touchdown.

=== Seattle Seahawks ===
Meyer was signed by the Seattle Seahawks in July 2007. He competed against third-string Seahawk quarterback David Greene and free agent Derek Devine for the third-string job. Meyer was cut by the Seahawks on August 28, 2007.

=== Oakland Raiders ===
On March 24, 2008, Meyer was signed by the Oakland Raiders. He was waived on June 25, 2008, to make room for Sam Keller.

=== Hamilton Tiger-Cats ===
On February 24, 2009, Meyer was signed by the Hamilton Tiger-Cats. He was released on June 9, 2009.

=== Spokane Shock ===
Meyer was signed by the Spokane Shock on December 23, 2009. Meyer appeared in two games connecting on 18 of 28 passes for 274 yards, 5 touchdowns, and one interception.

=== Utah Blaze ===
Meyer signed with the Utah Blaze on September 22, 2010. Meyer was the backup to Tommy Grady.

=== Spokane Shock ===
Meyer was traded back to the Spokane Shock with Raymond McNeil for Khreem Smith and Antonio Narcisse on May 30, 2011. After spending 3 seasons as the backup to Kyle Rowley, Meyer was given a chance to start in 2013. Meyer responded by leading the league in touchdown passes, with 112. Meyer's 112 touchdowns and 4,667 passing yards, were both new Shock records. Meyer lead the Shock to a 14–4 record, clinching the #2 seed in the National Conference. Following the season, Meyer was named First-team All-Arena by the AFL. Meyer was recognized again by the AFL, earning Offensive Player of the Year and League MVP Awards. On December 16, 2013, Meyer was assigned to Spokane for the 2014 season.

=== San Jose SaberCats ===
On October 10, 2014, Meyer was assigned to the San Jose SaberCats. He helped the Sabercats to a 17–1 regular season record while earning Second-team All-Arena honors. The Sabercats won ArenaBowl XXVIII against the Jacksonville Sharks on August 29, 2015.

=== Washington Valor ===
Meyer was assigned to the Washington Valor in February 2017. On May 24, 2017, Meyer was placed on injured reserve. On July 3, 2017, it was announced that Meyer was retiring.

=== AFL statistics ===
Legend
	AFL MVP
	Won the ArenaBowl
	Led the league
**Bold**	Career high

Year	Team	Passing							Rushing		
Year	Team	Cmp	Att	Pct	Yds	TD	Int	Rtg	Att	Yds	TD
2010	Spokane	18	28	64.3	274	5	1	121.13	1	0	0
2011	Spokane	80	108	**74.1**	967	22	3	**129.13**	13	39	3
2012	Spokane	25	45	55.6	294	6	2	90.42	2	7	1
2013	Spokane	**403**	**591**	68.2	**4,661**	**112**	**11**	123.60	**56**	110	15
2014	Spokane	236	354	66.7	2,519	54	9	114.83	48	112	**20**
2015	San Jose	353	528	66.9	4,057	93	6	124.66	30	**136**	6
2017	Washington	99	167	59.3	1,132	20	5	97.19	11	50	1
Career		1,214	1,821	66.7	13,904	312	37	120.57	161	454	46

== Coaching career ==
In 2013, Meyer began coaching quarterbacks at Central Washington University. Meyer has been the quarterbacks coach at his alma mater, La Mirada High School since 2008. He has also spent time as the offensive coordinator at La Mirada. In 2017, Meyer became an offensive quality control coach for the California Golden Bears.

In 2020, Meyer was hired as the quarterbacks coach and passing game coordinator for California Polytechnic State University, San Luis Obispo. He was promoted to co-offensive coordinator in 2024.
