= Derrick Ross =

American gridiron football player (born 1983)

No. 4, 39
- Position: Fullback

Personal information
- Born: December 29, 1983 (age 42); Huntsville, Texas, U.S.
- Listed height: 6 ft 0 in (1.83 m)
- Listed weight: 250 lb (113 kg)

Career information
- High school: Huntsville
- College: Tarleton State
- NFL draft: 2006: undrafted

Career history
- Kansas City Chiefs (2006); Cologne Centurions (2007); Montreal Alouettes (2008)*; Winnipeg Blue Bombers (2009)*; San Angelo Stampede Express (2010); Dallas Vigilantes (2011); Philadelphia Soul (2012–2014); Los Angeles KISS (2015)*; Las Vegas Outlaws (2015)*; Jacksonville Sharks (2015–2018); Albany Empire (2021)
- * Offseason or practice squad member only

Awards and highlights
- NAL champion (2017); NFLE Co-Offensive MVP (2007); 5× First-team All-Arena (2011–2015); First-team All-NAL (2017); First-team All-IFL (2010); IFL Offensive Rookie of the Year (2010)

Career NFL statistics
- Games played: 7
- Rushing attempts: 3
- Rushing yards: 8
- Touchdowns: 0
- Stats at Pro Football Reference

Career AFL statistics
- Rushes: 872
- Rushing yards: 3,245
- Rushing TDs: 195
- Receiving yards: 581
- Receiving TDs: 13
- Stats at ArenaFan.com

Derrick Lewis Ross (born December 29, 1983) is an American former professional football player who was a running back in the Arena Football League (AFL), National Football League (NFL), and NFL Europe. Ross played college football at Blinn College before transferring to Tarleton State University. He is the AFL's all-time leader in carries (872), rushing yards (3,245), and rushing touchdowns (195).

== Early life ==
Ross attended Huntsville High School in Huntsville, Texas. Ross began his high school career as a defensive end before switching to running back.

== College career ==
Ross started his college football career at Blinn College in Brenham, Texas. As a sophomore in 2003, Ross was named first-team All-Southwest Junior College Football Conference, as well the conference Offensive MVP. After graduating from Blinn, Ross transferred to Tarleton State University in Stephenville, Texas, where he had received a football scholarship. In his first game with the Texans, Ross ran for a then-school record 261 yards on just 20 carries.

== Professional career ==
=== Kansas City Chiefs ===
Ross played for the Kansas City Chiefs as a backup fullback for the 2006 season. He played in seven games, gaining three yards.

=== Cologne Centurions ===
Ross spent a year in Cologne, Germany on the roster of the Cologne Centurions of NFL Europe, where he was awarded Co-Offensive MVP alongside J. T. O'Sullivan.

=== Canadian Football League ===
Ross spent two years in the CFL With the Winnipeg Blue Bombers and Montreal Alouettes as a backup halfback and special teamer.

=== San Angelo Stampede Express ===
Ross spent a year in the Indoor Football League for the San Angelo Stampede Express, where he was awarded Rookie of the Year

=== Dallas Vigilantes ===
Ross kicked off his AFL career with a one-year contract for the Dallas Vigilantes.

=== Philadelphia Soul ===
In 2012, Ross and quarterback Dan Raudabaugh were brought to the Soul, with Ross being signed to a three-year deal. Following the 2013 season, Ross was named first-team All-Arena for the third consecutive season. Also in the same year Ross broke the AFL's leagues all-time rushing record, a record previously held by Bo Kelly. During the Soul's June 7, 2014, game, Ross passed Barry Wagner as the AFL's all-time leader in rushing touchdowns.

=== Los Angeles KISS ===
On February 20, 2015, Ross was traded to the Los Angeles KISS in exchange for Beau Bell.

=== Las Vegas Outlaws ===
On March 11, 2015, Ross was traded to the Las Vegas Outlaws, along with Lacoltan Bester, for Donovan Morgan.

=== Jacksonville Sharks ===
On March 15, 2015, before the start of the 2015 AFL season, Ross was traded to the Jacksonville Sharks in exchange for Undra Hendrix, Jomo Wilson and Nyere Aumaitre. Ross was assigned to the Sharks on October 22, 2015, on a 2-year contract. The Sharks moved to the National Arena League (NAL) in 2017.

=== Albany Empire ===
Ross played for the Albany Empire of the NAL in 2021. He was released on July 13, 2021. He was leading the league in carries with 40 and rushing touchdowns with eight at the time of his release.

=== AFL statistics ===
Legend
	AFL record
	Led the league
**Bold**	Career high

Year	Team	Rushing			Receiving		
Year	Team	Att	Yds	TD	Rec	Yds	TD
2011	Dallas	167	622	39	10	89	0
2012	Philadelphia	146	645	32	13	187	5
2013	Philadelphia	153	506	35	13	69	4
2014	Philadelphia	151	487	36	20	198	4
2015	Jacksonville	147	586	33	2	16	0
2016	Jacksonville	108	399	20	6	22	0
Career		872	3,245	195	64	581	13
