= Ken Fontenette =

American football player (born 1986)

No. 5
- Position: Defensive back

Personal information
- Born: January 14, 1986 (age 40); Austin, Texas, U.S.
- Listed height: 5 ft 11 in (1.80 m)
- Listed weight: 190 lb (86 kg)

Career information
- High school: Connally (Pflugerville, Texas)
- College: Houston
- NFL draft: 2009: undrafted

Career history
- Arkansas Diamonds (2010); Kansas City Command (2011); San Antonio Talons (2012); San Jose SaberCats (2013–2015)

Awards and highlights
- ArenaBowl champion (2015); Second-team All-Arena (2015); 2× Second-team All-Conference USA (2007, 2008); Conference USA All-Freshman Team (2005)

Career AFL statistics
- Tackles: 566
- Pass breakups: 123
- Forced fumbles: 4
- Fumble recoveries: 7
- Interceptions: 27
- Stats at ArenaFan.com

Kenneth Julius Fontenette, Jr. (born January 14, 1986) is an American former professional football defensive back who played in the Arena Football League (AFL). He played college football at University of Houston.
