= Tommy Taggart =

American football player (born 1986)

No. 24, 54
- Position: Fullback

Personal information
- Born: May 17, 1986 (age 40)
- Listed height: 6 ft 3 in (1.91 m)
- Listed weight: 295 lb (134 kg)

Career information
- High school: Euless (TX) Trinity
- College: Oklahoma
- NFL draft: 2009: undrafted

Career history
- Bossier-Shreveport Battle Wings (2009); Dallas Vigilantes (2010); New Orleans VooDoo (2011); San Jose SaberCats (2012); Pittsburgh Power (2014); Philadelphia Soul (2015)

Awards and highlights
- Second-team All-Arena (2015)

Career AFL statistics
- Rushing attempts: 263
- Rushing Yards: 787
- Rushing TDs: 47
- Receiving Yards: 170
- Receiving TDs: 6
- Stats at ArenaFan.com

Tommy Taggart (born May 17, 1986) is an American former professional football fullback who played in the Arena Football League (AFL). He played college football at Oklahoma, where he was a defensive tackle. He was signed as an undrafted free agent by the Bossier-Shreveport Battle Wings in 2009.

In 2015, Taggart was assigned to the Philadelphia Soul.
