= 2015 Cleveland Gladiators season =

Arena Football League team season

- Owner: Dan Gilbert
- Head coach: Steve Thonn
- Home stadium: Quicken Loans Arena

Results
- Record: 8–10
- Division place: 2nd AC East
- Playoffs: Lost Conference Semifinals (Soul) 35-47

The 2015 Cleveland Gladiators season was the 16th season for the franchise in the Arena Football League, and their sixth while in Cleveland. The team was coached by Steve Thonn and played their home games at Quicken Loans Arena. The Gladiators finished with an 8-10 record after going the previous year 17-1, but qualified for the playoffs again.

== Standings ==
2015 American Conference standings
Team	Overall			Points			Records			
Team	W	L	T	PCT	PF	PA	DIV	CON	Home	Away
East Division
^{(1)} Philadelphia Soul	15	3	0	.833	1060	823	6–0	11–3	9–0	6–3
^{(4)} Cleveland Gladiators	8	10	0	.444	953	959	3–3	6–8	3–6	5–4
New Orleans VooDoo	3	14	1	.194	692	919	0–6	2–12	3–6	0–8–1
South Division
^{(2)} Orlando Predators	12	6	0	.667	1023	951	5–1	10–4	7–2	5–4
^{(3)} Jacksonville Sharks	10	8	0	.556	971	901	2–4	8–6	7–2	3–6
Tampa Bay Storm	7	11	0	.389	820	942	2–4	5–9	5–4	2–7

== Schedule ==
=== Regular season ===
The 2015 regular season schedule was released on December 19, 2014.

Week	Day	Date	Kickoff	Opponent	Results		Location	Attendance	Report
Week	Day	Date	Kickoff	Opponent	Score	Record	Location	Attendance	Report
1	Friday	March 27	7:30 p.m. EDT	at Tampa Bay Storm	W 60–44	1–0	Amalie Arena	9,727	
2	Saturday	April 4	8:00 p.m. EDT	at New Orleans VooDoo	W 70–42	2–0	Smoothie King Center	3,818	
3	Saturday	April 11	7:00 p.m. EDT	Arizona Rattlers	L 41–49	2–1	Quicken Loans Arena	12,776	
4	Saturday	April 18	7:00 p.m. EDT	at Philadelphia Soul	L 48–63	2–2	Wells Fargo Center	10,008	
5	Friday	April 24	7:00 p.m. EDT	Tampa Bay Storm	W 62–54	3–2	Quicken Loans Arena	11,120	
6	Saturday	May 2	7:00 p.m. EDT	at Orlando Predators	W 56–55 (OT)	4–2	Amway Center	9,212	
7	Friday	May 8	7:00 p.m. EDT	Jacksonville Sharks	L 43–46	4–3	Quicken Loans Arena	9,872	
8	Friday	May 15	7:00 p.m. EDT	New Orleans VooDoo	W 64–42	5–3	Quicken Loans Arena	12,127	
9	Saturday	May 23	10:30 p.m. EDT	at San Jose SaberCats	L 58–70	5–4	SAP Center at San Jose	7,474	
10	Friday	May 29	7:00 p.m. EDT	Orlando Predators	L 42–63	5–5	Quicken Loans Arena	10,670	
11	Sunday	June 7	5:00 p.m. EDT	at Las Vegas Outlaws	W 63–44	6–5	Thomas & Mack Center	3,255	
12	Friday	June 12	8:30 p.m. EDT	at New Orleans VooDoo	W 51–34	7–5	Smoothie King Center	4,131	
13	Friday	June 19	7:00 p.m. EDT	Tampa Bay Storm	L 48–52	7–6	Quicken Loans Arena	10,123	
14	Saturday	June 27	7:00 p.m. EDT	at Jacksonville Sharks	L 41–74	7–7	Jacksonville Veterans Memorial Arena	10,123	
15	Bye								
16	Saturday	July 11	1:00 p.m. EDT	at Philadelphia Soul	L 56–72	7–8	Wells Fargo Center	8,784	
17	Saturday	July 18	6:00 p.m. EDT	Orlando Predators	L 58–65	7–9	Quicken Loans Arena	13,186	
18	Bye								
19	Saturday	August 1	7:00 p.m. EDT	Spokane Shock	W 59–42	8–9	Quicken Loans Arena	11,674	
20	Saturday	August 8	7:00 p.m. EDT	Philadelphia Soul	L 33–48	8–10	Quicken Loans Arena	12,474	

=== Playoffs ===
Round	Day	Date	Kickoff	Opponent	Results	Location	Attendance	Report
AC Semifinals	Saturday	August 15	5:00 p.m. EDT	at Philadelphia Soul	L 35–47	Wells Fargo Center		

== Roster ==
2015 Cleveland Gladiators roster
Quarterbacks: 10 Shane Austin; 14 Chris Dieker; Fullbacks: 72 Phillipkeith Manley; Wide receivers: 16 Dominick Goodman; 88 Josiah Holt; 11 Amarri Jackson; 6 Thyron Lewis; 17 Collin Taylor	Offensive linemen: 73 Adrian Battles; 69 D. J. Brandel; 71 C. J. Cobb; 51 Kody Bray; Defensive linemen: 44 Mike Alston; 33 Brian Brikowski; 96 Randy Colling; 56 Willie McGinnis; 4 Jeramie Richardson	Linebackers: 9 Anthony Degrate; Defensive backs: 2 Dominic Jones; 1 Marrio Norman; 5 Joe Phinisee; -- Joe Powell; 3 Terrance Sanders; Kickers: 19 Adrian Trevino	Injured reserve: -- Marcus Barnett WR; 49 Tim Cheatwood LB; 88 Tyrone Collins WR; 7 Donnie Fletcher DB; 40 Corey Howard FB; -- David Lewis WR; 3 Quorey Payne WR; 74 Jesse Peterson OL; 8 Fred Shaw DB; 93 Austin Teitsma DL; 34 Colby Way DL; Other league exempt: -- Darren Keyton OL; -- Roosevelt Nix-Jones DL; 79 Kitt O'Brien OL; League suspension: -- James Bryant LB; 15 Andy Cruse WR; 20 Justin Hannah DB; 77 Jayson Palmgren OL; 1 Brandon Stephens DB; 93 Curtis Young DL; Inactive reserve: 7 Devon Dace DB; -- Kenny Veal DB; Refuse to report: 21 Trevor Coston DB; -- Marcus Hall OL; Recallable reassignment: Currently vacant; Rookies in italics Roster updated August 13, 2015; 24 Active, 24 Inactive → More rosters
