= Joe Hills (American football) =

American gridiron football player (born 1987)

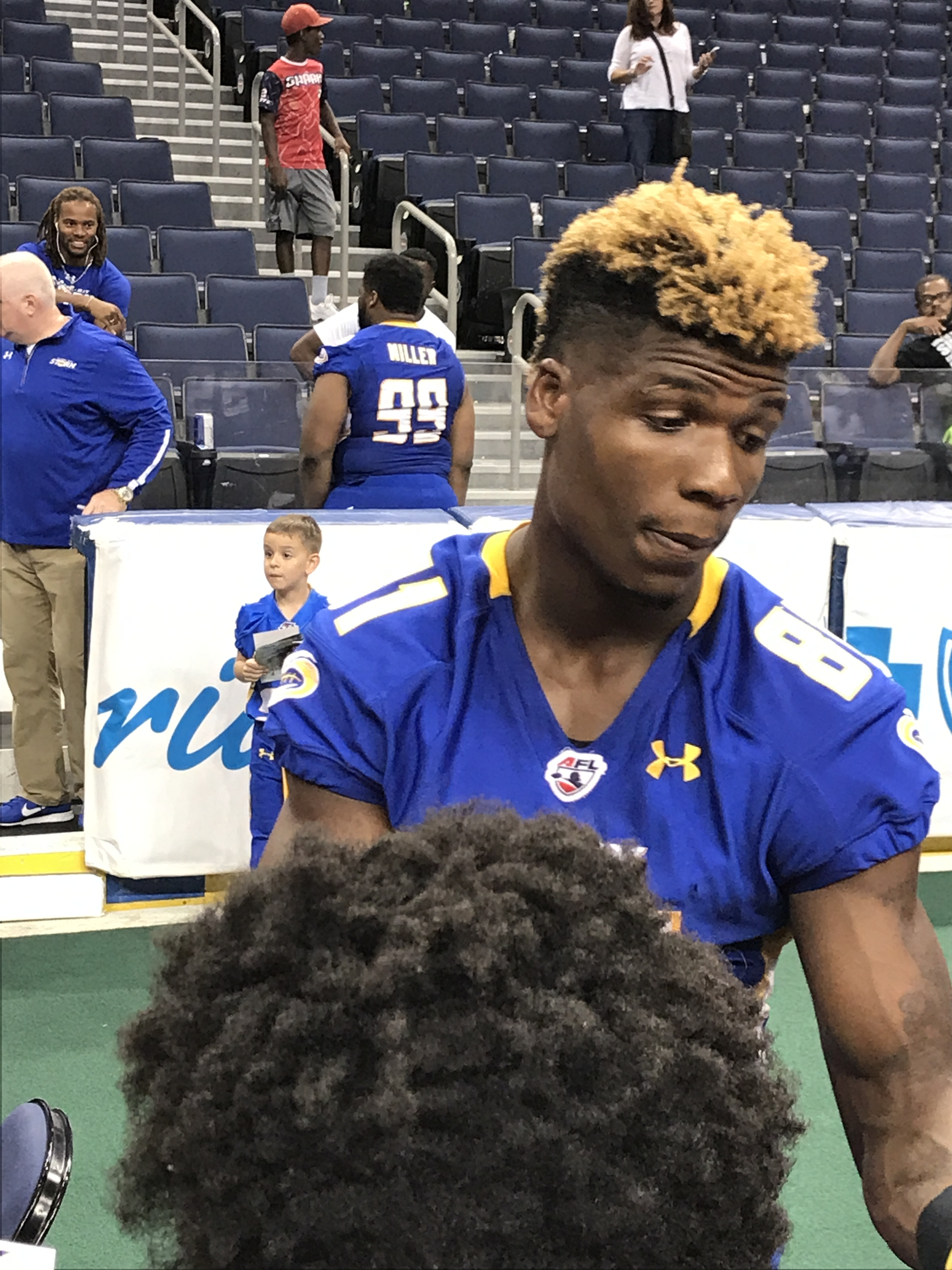
- Hills with the Tampa Bay Storm in 2017

No. 2, 81
- Position: Wide receiver

Personal information
- Born: October 2, 1987 (age 39); Palmetto, Florida, U.S.
- Listed height: 6 ft 4 in (1.93 m)
- Listed weight: 210 lb (95 kg)

Career information
- High school: Palmetto
- College: Tennessee State
- NFL draft: 2011: undrafted

Career history
- Tennessee Titans (2011)*; Spokane Shock (2012); Tampa Bay Storm (2012–2014); Hamilton Tiger-Cats (2014)*; Pittsburgh Power (2015)*; Jacksonville Sharks (2015–2016); Dalian Dragon Kings (2016)*; Tampa Bay Storm (2017); Jacksonville Sharks (2017); Florida Tarpons (2018); Albany Empire (2018); Baltimore Brigade (2019)
- * Offseason or practice squad member only

Awards and highlights
- 4× First-team All-Arena (2013, 2016, 2017, 2018); Second-team All-Arena (2015); AFL Offensive Player of the Year (2016); 2× AFL Wide Receiver of the Year (2016—2017)

Career AFL statistics
- Receptions: 877
- Receiving yards: 10,599
- Touchdowns: 283
- Stats at ArenaFan.com

Joseph Hills (born October 2, 1987) is an American former professional football wide receiver who played in the Arena Football League (AFL). He played college football at South Carolina from 2007 to 2008 before transferring to Tennessee State.

== Early life ==
Hills attended Palmetto High School in Palmetto, Florida. There, he was a standout member of the football team being ranked as the No. 27 recruit at the wide receiver position.

College recruiting
| Name | Hometown | School | Height | Weight | 40^{‡} | Commit date |
|---|---|---|---|---|---|---|
| Joseph Hills; WR | Palmetto, Florida | Palmetto High School | 6 ft 4 in (1.93 m) | 213 lb (97 kg) | 4.55 | Nov 17, 2006 |
| Joseph Hills; WR | Recruit ratings: Scout: Rivals: | | | | | |
Overall recruit ranking: Scout: 90 (WR) Rivals: 27 (WR), 37 (FL)
Note: In many cases, Scout, Rivals, 247Sports, On3, and ESPN may conflict in their listings of height and weight.; In these cases, the average was taken. ESPN grades are on a 100-point scale.; Sources: "South Carolina Football Commitments". Rivals.; "2007 South Carolina Football Commits". Scout.; "Scout.com Team Recruiting Rankings". Scout.; "2007 Team Ranking". Rivals.com.

Hills committed to the University of South Carolina on November 17, 2006. Hills chose South Carolina over football scholarships from Georgia, Louisville, LSU, Ole Miss, & Nebraska.

== College career ==
Hills played two seasons for the South Carolina Gamecocks of the University of South Carolina. He played in 13 games, starting 3 games, for the Gamecocks, recording 11 receptions for 87 yards and one touchdown. After the 2008 season, Hills transferred to Tennessee State University. He played in 11 games, starting 9, in 2009, catching 39 passes for 528 yards and three touchdowns. He appeared in 11 games, all starts, his senior year in 2010, catching 40 passes for 462 yards and 4 touchdowns.

== Professional career ==
Hills was rated the 64th best wide receiver in the 2011 NFL draft by NFLDraftScout.com.

Pre-draft measurables
| Height | Weight | 40-yard dash | 10-yard split | 20-yard split | 20-yard shuttle | Three-cone drill | Vertical jump | Broad jump | Bench press |
|---|---|---|---|---|---|---|---|---|---|
| 6 ft 4 in (1.93 m) | 211 lb (96 kg) | 4.60 s | 1.58 s | 2.58 s | 4.44 s | 7.10 s | 37 1/2 in (0.95 m) | 10 ft 10 in (3.30 m) | 18 reps |
All values from Pro Day

=== Tennessee Titans ===
After failing to be drafted in the 2011 NFL draft, Hills was invited to training camp by the Tennessee Titans. Hills suffered an ankle injury during camp, ruining his chances at making the final roster. He was cut on September 4, 2011.

=== Spokane Shock ===
Hills signed with the Spokane Shock of the Arena Football League (AFL) before the 2012 season.

=== Tampa Bay Storm ===
Hills finished the 2012 season with the Tampa Bay Storm.

Hills had a big season for the Storm in 2013, earning 1st Team All-Arena honors, finishing in the top 7 of the league in receptions (133), receiving yards (1,861) and receiving touchdowns (42).

Hills attended rookie minicamp with the Carolina Panthers in May 2013.

=== Hamilton Tiger-Cats ===
Hills was signed to the Hamilton Tiger-Cats' practice roster on August 12, 2014. He was released by the Tiger-Cats on August 29, 2014.

=== Pittsburgh Power ===
On September 25, 2014, Hills was assigned to the Pittsburgh Power. The Power folded in November 2014, making Hills a free agent.

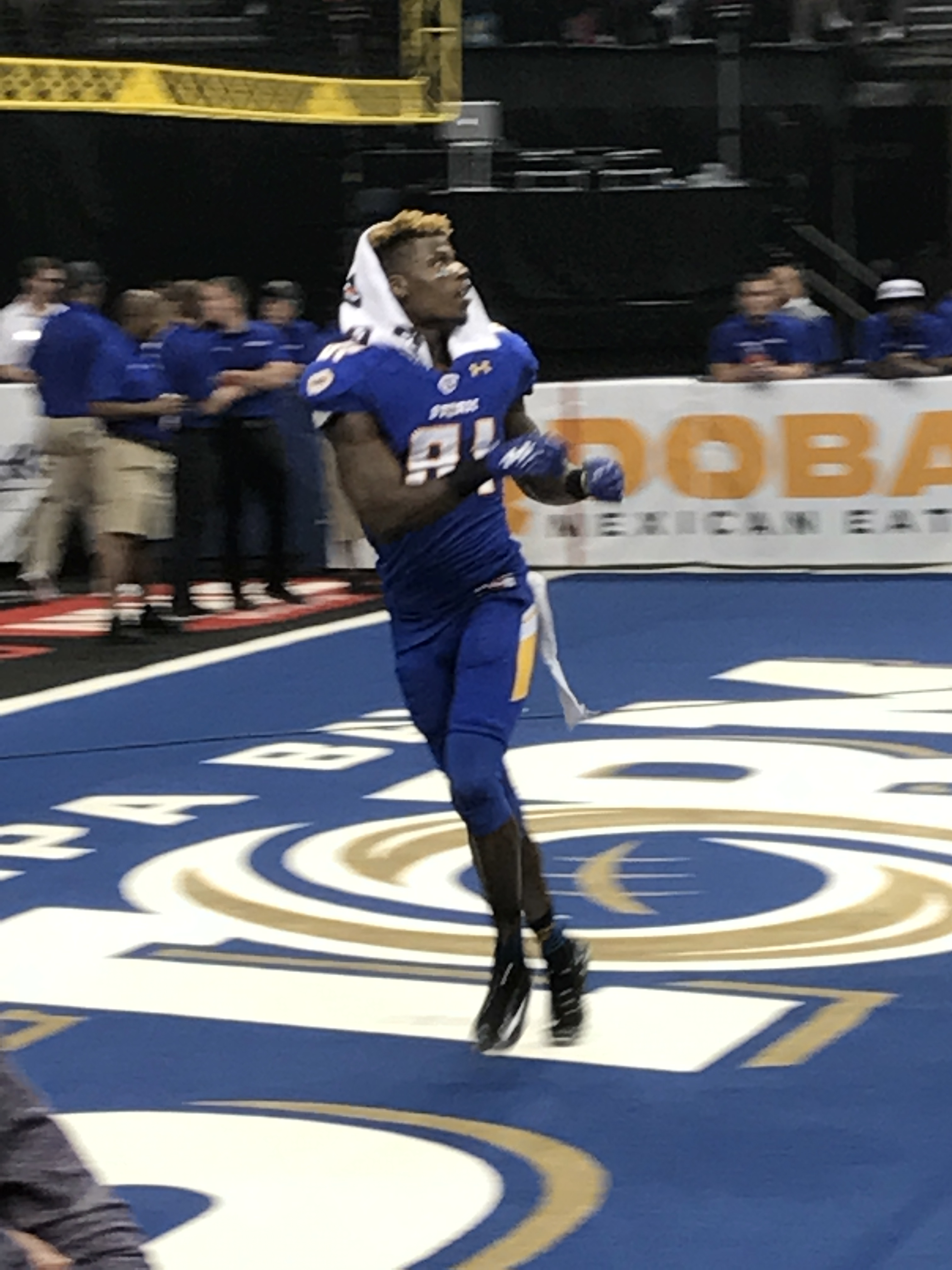
Hills in 2017

=== Jacksonville Sharks ===
On December 30, 2014, Hills was assigned to the Jacksonville Sharks. Hills had a terrific season with the Sharks, breaking Jeron Harvey's team record for receptions. Hills was named a Second-team All-Arena selection in 2015. On October 21, 2015, Hills was assigned to the Sharks for the 2016 season. Hills went on to have another spectacular year for the Sharks in 2016 raking in 2,020 reception yards and 50+ touchdowns earning himself receiver of the year honors. Hills won the 2016 Arena Football League Offensive Player of the Year Award. He was also named the Cutters Receiver of the Year.

=== Dalian Dragon Kings ===
In 2016, Hills was the first American selected (second overall pick) in the 2016 draft of the China Arena Football League being selected by the Dalian Dragon Kings. However, he did not play for the team.

=== Tampa Bay Storm ===
Hills was assigned to the Tampa Bay Storm on January 9, 2017. He was placed on league suspension on June 27, 2017. He was named the AFL Wide Receiver of the Year in 2017. He also earned First-team All-Arena honors. The Storm folded in December 2017.

=== Jacksonville Sharks ===
Hills signed with the Jacksonville Sharks of the National Arena League on June 22, 2017. He played in one game for the Sharks and then returned to the Storm.

=== Florida Tarpons ===
Hills signed with the Florida Tarpons of the American Arena League on January 12, 2018.

=== Albany Empire ===
Hills was assigned to the Albany Empire of the Arena Football League (AFL) on April 20, 2018.

=== AFL statistics ===
Legend
| | AFL Offensive Player of the Year |
| | Led the league |
| **Bold** | Career high |

| Year | Team | | | |
| Year | Team | Rec | Yds | TD |
|---|---|---|---|---|
| 2012 | Spokane | 14 | 134 | 1 |
| 2012 | Tampa Bay | 39 | 648 | 13 |
| 2013 | Tampa Bay | 133 | 1,869 | 42 |
| 2014 | Tampa Bay | 100 | 1,252 | 38 |
| 2015 | Jacksonville | 150 | 1,607 | 42 |
| 2016 | Jacksonville | **161** | **2,020** | **58** |
| 2017 | Tampa Bay | 129 | 1,353 | 36 |
| 2018 | Albany | 88 | 1,045 | 33 |
| 2019 | Baltimore | 63 | 689 | 20 |
| Career | | 877 | 10,599 | 283 |
