= A. J. Dalton =

British writer

- Born: Adam James Dalton; 1 September 1970 (age 56)
- Education: University of Warwick
- Occupation: Novelist
- Writing career
- Period: 2008–present
- Genre: Fantasy
- Notable works: The Book of Angels, Empire of the Saviours, Necromancer's Gambit
- Website: www.ajdalton.eu

Adam James Dalton (born September 1970) is a British fantasy writer and teacher of English. He is the author of the best-selling Chronicles of a Cosmic Warlord series (Empire of the Saviours, Gateway of the Saviours and Tithe of the Saviours), the Flesh & Bone trilogy (Necromancer's Gambit, Necromancer's Betrayal and Necromancer's Fall), and three collections with Grimbold Books (The Book of Orm, The Book of Angels and The Book of Dragons). He has also published books of poetry and a range of academic articles on science fiction and fantasy.

== Biography ==
Adam Dalton was born in Croydon, England on a dark and stormy night. He was educated at Whitgift School and the University of Warwick, where he completed a BA in English and American Literature and an MA in English literature.

Dalton moved into English language teaching, working in a variety of countries between 1996 and 2005. He then took a managerial position in Manchester, England, with the British Council, the UK's international organisation for cultural relations, a registered charity. While working there, he self-published the Flesh & Bone series: Necromancer's Gambit (2008), Necromancer's Betrayal (2009), and Necromancer's Fall (2010). In late 2011, he signed a deal with Gollancz for Empire of the Saviours and a further two volumes, namely Gateway of the Saviours and Tithe of the Saviours. In 2015, he published The Book of Orm with Kristell Ink, a collection of fantasy stories based on Scandinavian mythology. He followed that collection with The Book of Angels in 2016 and The Book of Dragons in 2017.

Dalton's academic study of fantasy and its subgenres was completed in 2018, when he completed a PhD at the University of Huddersfield. That academic work, his earlier publications and website (2008) have seen him recognised as the creator and lead author of the fantasy sub-genre known as 'metaphysical fantasy'.

== Publications ==
=== Standalones ===
- The Book of Orm (Apr 2015)
- The Book of Angels (Sept 2016)
- The Book of Dragons (Sept 2017)

=== Chronicles of a Cosmic Warlord ===
1. Empire of the Saviours (May 2012) – longlisted for the Gemmell Legend Award 2013
2. Gateway of the Saviours (May 2013)
3. Tithe of the Saviours (May 2014)

=== The Flesh & Bone Series ===
1. Necromancer's Gambit (Feb 2008)
2. Necromancer's Betrayal (Aug 2009)
3. Necromancer's Fall (Aug 2010)

=== Novellas ===
- Knight of Ages (Oct 2012)
- I am a Small God (Sept 2016)

=== Poetry collections ===
- Dark Woods Rising (Nov 2024)
- Green Man Ascendant (Oct 2025)

=== Short stories ===
- "A Passport to Your Dreams" (appeared in the 2005 book Blending In: Farang Reflections on Living in Thai Culture)
- "With a Biochecker, You’ll Never Be Ill Again" (Worlds of IF #177, Feb 2024)
