= Tiger Jones (American football) =

American football player and coach (born 1982)

North Alabama Lions
- Title: Director of football performance

Personal information
- Born: May 21, 1982 (age 44); Mobile, Alabama, U.S.
- Listed height: 5 ft 10 in (1.78 m)
- Listed weight: 195 lb (88 kg)

Career information
- High school: St. Paul's Episcopal School (Mobile, Alabama)
- College: Louisville (2000–2004)
- NFL draft: 2005: undrafted

Career history

Playing
- Washington Redskins (2005)*; BC Lions (2006)*; Louisville Fire (2007); Georgia Force (2008); Milwaukee Iron (2010); Dallas Vigilantes (2011); Virginia Destroyers (2011)*; Philadelphia Soul (2012–2014); Philadelphia Eagles (2012)*; Jacksonville Sharks (2015–2016)
- * Offseason or practice squad member only

Coaching
- Texas A&M (2017) Assistant strength & conditioning coach; Louisiana (2018–2020) Assistant director of strength and conditioning; Arizona (2021) Assistant strength & conditioning coach; Florida Gators (2022–2023) Director of speed improvement and skill development; Alabama (2024) Assistant coach; North Alabama (2025–present) Director of football performance

Awards and highlights
- All-Rookie Team (2008); 2× Second Team All-Arena (2010, 2012); 3× First Team All-Arena (2011, 2013, 2015); Wide Receiver of the Year (2011)

Career AFL statistics
- Receptions: 1,041
- Receiving Yards: 14,329
- Receiving TDs: 286
- Rushing Yards: 81
- Rushing TDs: 8
- Stats at ArenaFan.com

Anthony Keith "Tiger" Jones (born May 21, 1982) is an American former football wide receiver who played eight seasons in the Arena Football League (AFL). He played college football at Louisville. He was a member of the Washington Redskins (2005), and was in Training Camp with the Philadelphia Eagles (2012).

== Professional career ==
=== Philadelphia Eagles ===
Jones signed with the Philadelphia Eagles on July 22, 2012. He was released in August 2012.

=== Philadelphia Soul ===
Jones was named to his 2nd First Team All-Arena team as a member of the Philadelphia Soul in 2013.

=== Jacksonville Sharks ===
On February 16, 2015, Jones was assigned to the Jacksonville Sharks. On October 19, 2015, Jones was once again assigned to the Sharks. He retired in January 2017.
