= 2015 Arena Football League season =

- League: Arena Football League
- Sport: Arena football
- Duration: March 27, 2015 – August 29, 2015

Regular season
- Season champions: San Jose SaberCats
- Season MVP: Dan Raudabaugh (PHI)

League postseason
- American Conference champions: Jacksonville Sharks
- American Conference runners-up: Philadelphia Soul
- National Conference champions: San Jose SaberCats
- National Conference runners-up: Arizona Rattlers

ArenaBowl XXVIII
- Champions: San Jose SaberCats
- Runners-up: Jacksonville Sharks
- Finals MVP: Reggie Gray, SJ

AFL seasons
- ← 2014 2016 →

American: East, South
National: Pacific, West

The 2015 Arena Football League season was the 28th season in the history of the league. The regular season began on March 27, 2015 and ended on August 8, 2015.

== League business ==
=== Teams ===
The city of Las Vegas, Nevada was awarded an expansion team on June 18, 2014. The team, named the Las Vegas Outlaws, was the first AFL team to call Las Vegas home since the Las Vegas Gladiators in 2007. Vince Neil, lead singer of the rock band Mötley Crüe, was the majority owner of the expansion franchise. The Outlaws' expansion draft took place on December 22, 2014.

Two teams that competed in 2014 suspended operations (Pittsburgh Power and San Antonio Talons), and their rosters became signable upon offseason assignment process held on December 23, 2014.

The Iowa Barnstormers were the third and final team to leave the AFL for the 2015 season when they joined the Indoor Football League (IFL) on August 27, 2014. In 2015 all games were televised, most on ESPN, ESPN2, ESPNEWS, and especially on ESPN3 (available online through WatchESPN) and some on the CBS Sports Network.

On July 15, the league took over the daily operations of the Las Vegas Outlaws and New Orleans VooDoo after financial problems and declining attendance. As a result, their game against each other (which was set to be played on the 25th) was cancelled and declared a tie, only the 3rd in AFL history and the only cancellation in league history. The league ran both teams to the end of the season with the intent of looking for new ownership in the offseason but on August 9, the day following the conclusion of the regular season, both teams ceased operations. Las Vegas had qualified for a playoff spot, the final one in the National Conference, but the league's board of directors voted against their inclusion in the postseason, considering that with no team ownership, there was no funding for the team. The Outlaws were replaced in the playoffs by the Portland Thunder, who had finished last in their division but had the better record of the two remaining non-playoff National Conference teams, meaning that all teams in the Pacific Division made the playoffs.

=== Alignment ===
Conference	Division	Teams
American	East	Cleveland Gladiators, New Orleans VooDoo, Philadelphia Soul
American	South	Jacksonville Sharks, Orlando Predators, Tampa Bay Storm
National	Pacific	Portland Thunder, San Jose SaberCats, Spokane Shock
National	West	Arizona Rattlers, Las Vegas Outlaws, Los Angeles Kiss

== Regular season standings ==
2015 American Conference standings
Team	Overall			Points			Records			
Team	W	L	T	PCT	PF	PA	DIV	CON	Home	Away
East Division
^{(1)} Philadelphia Soul	15	3	0	.833	1060	823	6–0	11–3	9–0	6–3
^{(4)} Cleveland Gladiators	8	10	0	.444	953	959	3–3	6–8	3–6	5–4
New Orleans VooDoo	3	14	1	.194	692	919	0–6	2–12	3–6	0–8–1
South Division
^{(2)} Orlando Predators	12	6	0	.667	1023	951	5–1	10–4	7–2	5–4
^{(3)} Jacksonville Sharks	10	8	0	.556	971	901	2–4	8–6	7–2	3–6
Tampa Bay Storm	7	11	0	.389	820	942	2–4	5–9	5–4	2–7

2015 National Conference standings
Team	Overall			Points			Records			
Team	W	L	T	PCT	PF	PA	DIV	CON	Home	Away
Pacific Division
^{(1)} San Jose SaberCats	17	1	0	.944	1061	662	6–0	13–1	8–1	9–0
^{(3)} Spokane Shock	7	11	0	.389	847	971	2–4	6–8	4–5	3–6
^{(4)} Portland Thunder	5	13	0	.278	819	908	1–5	4–10	5–4	0–9
West Division
^{(2)} Arizona Rattlers	14	4	0	.778	1003	825	5–1	10–4	8–1	6–3
Las Vegas Outlaws	5	12	1	.306	740	909	3–3	5–9	3–5–1	2–7
Los Angeles Kiss	4	14	0	.222	724	915	1–5	4–10	3–6	1–8

== Playoffs ==
Conference Semifinals
1	Philadelphia	47
4	Cleveland	35
American Conference
2	Orlando	33
3	Jacksonville	55
1	San Jose	55
4	Portland	28
National Conference
2	Arizona	72
3	Spokane	41

Conference Championships
1	Philadelphia	56
3	Jacksonville	61
1	San Jose	70
2	Arizona	67

ArenaBowl XXVIII
3	Jacksonville	47
1	San Jose	68

=== Conference semifinals ===
Conference	Date	Kickoff	Away	Score	Home	Game site	Recap
National	August 14	11:00 p.m. EDT	Portland Thunder	28–55	San Jose Sabercats	SAP Center at San Jose	
American	August 15	5:00 p.m. EDT	Cleveland Gladiators	35–47	Philadelphia Soul	Wells Fargo Center	
American	August 15	7:30 p.m. EDT	Jacksonville Sharks	55–33	Orlando Predators	Amway Center	
National	August 15	9:00 p.m. EDT	Spokane Shock	41–72	Arizona Rattlers	Talking Stick Resort Arena	

=== Conference finals ===
Conference	Date	Kickoff	Away	Score	Home	Game site	Recap
National	August 22	8:00 p.m. EDT	Arizona Rattlers	67–70	San Jose SaberCats	Stockton Arena	
American	August 23	5:00 p.m. EDT	Jacksonville Sharks	61–56	Philadelphia Soul	Wells Fargo Center	

=== ArenaBowl XXVIII ===
Date	Kickoff	Away	Score	Home	Game site	Recap
August 29	7:00 p.m. EDT	Jacksonville Sharks	47–68	San Jose SaberCats	Stockton Arena	

== All-Arena team ==
Offense
Position	First team	Second team
Quarterback	Dan Raudabaugh, Philadelphia	Erik Meyer, San Jose
Fullback	Derrick Ross, Jacksonville	Tommy Taggart, Philadelphia
Wide receiver	Reggie Gray, San Jose; Donovan Morgan, Los Angeles; Anthony Jones, Jacksonville	Rod Windsor, Arizona; Joe Hills, Jacksonville; Marco Thomas, Philadelphia
Center	Shannon Breen, Philadelphia	John Collins, Portland
Offensive lineman	Moqut Ruffins, Jacksonville; Adam Smith, Philadelphia	Rich Ranglin, San Jose; Patrick Afif, Spokane

Defense
Position	First team	Second team
Defensive end	Joe Sykes, Jacksonville; James Ruffin, Spokane	Mike McAdoo, Arizona; Bryan Robinson, Philadelphia
Nose guard	Jason Stewart, San Jose	Willie McGinnis, Cleveland
Middle linebacker	Tyre Glasper, Arizona	Francis Maka, San Jose
Jack linebacker	Alvin Ray Jackson, Jacksonville	Terence Moore, Orlando
Defensive back	Jeremy Kellem, Arizona; James Romain, Philadelphia; Greg Reid, Jacksonville	Ken Fontenette, San Jose; James Harrell, Tampa Bay; Rayshaun Kizer, Los Angeles

Special teams
Position	First team	Second team
Kicker	Tommy Frevert, Philadelphia	Mark Lewis, Orlando
Kick returner	Duane Brooks, Portland	Brandon Thompkins, Orlando
