= South Division (AFL) =

South
- Conference: American Conference
- League: Arena Football League
- Sport: Arena football
- Founded: 1992 (as the Southern Division, as a member of the National Conference)
- Most recent champion: Orlando Predators (7th title)
- Most titles: Orlando Predators (7 titles)

The American Conference - South Division was a division of the Arena Football League's American Conference.

The Southern Division was formed in 1992 when the AFL first split into three divisions. The League used only conferences in 1993 and 1994, but returned to division play in 1995. The Southern Division has produced 10 ArenaBowl teams and 5 champions, with the most recent during the 2011 Arena Football League season by the Sharks. Rivalries such as the Tampa Bay Storm and Orlando Predators, known as the "War on I-4," used to define this division, but the Georgia Force had risen to the top and dominated in recent years before their folding.

== Division lineups ==
1992

- Charlotte Rage
- New Orleans Night
- Orlando Predators
- Tampa Bay Storm

Creation of the Southern Division. Charlotte Rage enfranchised. In 1993, New Orleans Night folded upon suspension of the Southern Division, while the league has been realigned into the American/National conference structure.

1995

- Miami Hooters
- Orlando Predators
- Tampa Bay Storm

The Southern Division returns, now part of the National Conference. Three of the National Conference teams, Miami, Orlando, and Tampa Bay reformed this division.

1996

- Florida Bobcats
- Orlando Predators
- Tampa Bay Storm
- Texas Terror

Miami Hooters renamed Florida Bobcats. Texas Terror enfranchised.

1997

- Florida Bobcats
- Orlando Predators
- Tampa Bay Storm

Texas Terror moved to the American Conference's Central Division.

1998–1999

- Florida Bobcats
- Nashville Kats
- Orlando Predators
- Tampa Bay Storm

Nashville moved in from the National Conference's Eastern Division.

2000

- Carolina Cobras
- Florida Bobcats
- Nashville Kats
- Orlando Predators
- Tampa Bay Storm

Carolina Cobras enfranchised.

2001

- Florida Bobcats
- Nashville Kats
- Orlando Predators
- Tampa Bay Storm

Carolina moved to Eastern Division.

2002–2003

- Carolina Cobras
- Georgia Force
- Orlando Predators
- Tampa Bay Storm

Carolina moved back from Eastern Division. Florida Bobcats folded. Nashville moved to Atlanta as Georgia Force.

2004–2005

- Austin Wranglers
- Georgia Force
- New Orleans VooDoo
- Orlando Predators
- Tampa Bay Storm

Austin Wranglers and New Orleans VooDoo enfranchised. Carolina moved back to Eastern Division.

2006

- Austin Wranglers
- Georgia Force
- Kansas City Brigade
- Orlando Predators
- Tampa Bay Storm

Kansas City Brigade enfranchised. New Orleans VooDoo suspended due to Hurricane Katrina.

2007

- Austin Wranglers
- Georgia Force
- New Orleans VooDoo
- Orlando Predators
- Tampa Bay Storm

Kansas City moved to Central Division. New Orleans reactivated.

2008

- Georgia Force
- New Orleans VooDoo
- Orlando Predators
- Tampa Bay Storm

Austin Wranglers moved to af2. In 2009, the AFL has been put on a one-year hiatus while Georgia Force and New Orleans are suspended.

2010

- Alabama Vipers
- Jacksonville Sharks
- Orlando Predators
- Tampa Bay Storm

The Southern Division moved to the American Conference. Alabama moved in from af2. Jacksonville Sharks enfranchised.

2011–2012

- Georgia Force
- Jacksonville Sharks
- New Orleans VooDoo
- Orlando Predators
- Tampa Bay Storm

Alabama moved to Duluth as Georgia Force. New Orleans reactivated.

2013–2014

- Jacksonville Sharks
- New Orleans VooDoo
- Orlando Predators
- Tampa Bay Storm

Georgia Force folded.

2015

- Jacksonville Sharks
- Orlando Predators
- Tampa Bay Storm

New Orleans VooDoo moved to East Division.

Divisions were discontinued after the 2015 season.

== Division Champions ==
- 1992: Orlando Predators (9–1)
- 1995: Tampa Bay Storm (10–2)
- 1996: Tampa Bay Storm (12–2)
- 1997: Orlando Predators (10–4)
- 1998: Tampa Bay Storm (12–2)
- 1999: Tampa Bay Storm (11–3)
- 2000: Orlando Predators (11–3)
- 2001: Nashville Kats (10–4)
- 2002: Orlando Predators (7–7)
- 2003: Tampa Bay Storm (12–4)
- 2004: New Orleans VooDoo (11–5)
- 2005: Georgia Force (11–5)
- 2006: Orlando Predators (10–6)
- 2007: Georgia Force (13–3)
- 2008: Georgia Force (10–6)
- 2010: Jacksonville Sharks (12–4)
- 2011: Jacksonville Sharks (14–4)
- 2012: Jacksonville Sharks (10–8)
- 2013: Jacksonville Sharks (12–6)
- 2014: Orlando Predators (11–7)
- 2015: Orlando Predators (12–6)
