= Jacksonville Sharks =

Arena football team

- Current season
Logo

General information
- Founded: 2009
- Headquartered: Jacksonville, Florida at the VyStar Veterans Memorial Arena
- Colors: Blood red, midnight black, white
- Mascot: Chum
- Website: jaxsharks.com

Personnel
- Owners: Steve Curran; Diva Nagula; Rob Storm; Jason Green; Kevin Wezniak; Nick Furris
- Head coach: Jason Gibson

Team history
- Jacksonville Sharks (2010–present)

Home fields
- VyStar Veterans Memorial Arena (2010–present)

League / conference affiliations
- Arena Football League (2010–2016); National Arena League (2017–2023); Indoor Football League (2024–present); Eastern Conference (2024–present)

Championships
- League championships: 4: ArenaBowl championships (1) 2011 (XXIV); NAL championships (3) 2017, 2019, 2023
- Conference championships: 2: AFL American: 2011, 2015
- Division championships: 4: AFL South: 2010, 2011, 2012, 2013

Playoff appearances (13)
- AFL: 2010, 2011, 2012, 2013, 2015, 2016; NAL: 2017, 2018, 2019, 2022, 2023; IFL: 2025, 2026

The Jacksonville Sharks are a professional indoor football team based in Jacksonville, Florida, that competes in the Indoor Football League (IFL). The team plays its home games at VyStar Veterans Memorial Arena.

They were members of the Arena Football League (AFL) from 2010 to 2016 and won the championship of their division in the first four seasons of their existence. The Sharks joined the AFL for the 2010 season, following the league's complete reorganization the previous year. In their inaugural season, they set the league record for most regular season wins by an expansion team, winning twelve of their sixteen games, and ranked third in the league in ticket sales and average attendance. They advanced to the 2010 AFL playoffs, claiming the South Division title. In their second year in the league, they advanced to the ArenaBowl XXIV, defeating the Arizona Rattlers 73–70, for the first AFL Championship in franchise history. The Sharks left the AFL after the 2016 season and became charter members of the National Arena League (NAL). They left the NAL after the 2023 season and plan to join the Indoor Football League for the 2024 season.

== History ==
=== Arena Football League (2010–2016) ===
The Arena Football League originally wanted to place a franchise in Jacksonville in the 1990s, citing the city's historical support for football. The proposal drew the attention of Wayne Weaver, then owner of the Jacksonville Jaguars, but the league decided that the Jacksonville Coliseum was too small for AFL standards. In 2000, the Jacksonville Tomcats began play in the af2, the AFL's developmental league. The AFL and Tomcats ownership anticipated the completion of the new 15,000-seat Jacksonville Veterans Memorial Arena, but the Tomcats folded after the 2002 season, before construction of the Arena was completed.

Interest in placing an arena football team in Jacksonville remained. In 2010, following the restructuring of the AFL and the cancellation of the 2009 season, the AFL announced it would place an expansion team in Jacksonville. The ownership group would be Jacksonville Sports Group, led by Jeff Bouchy, formerly part owner of the Orlando Predators AFL team under his brother Brett Bouchy. On May 3, 2014, it was officially announced that former Mötley Crüe front man Vince Neil purchased a minority stake in the team.

=== National Arena League (2017–2023) ===
On October 12, 2016, the Sharks announced that they were leaving the AFL for a rival league beginning with the 2017 season. The Sharks were rejected from their first choice of league, the Indoor Football League (which itself is the home of several former AFL franchises), as the IFL was focused on a regional footprint that did not include Florida.

On November 18, 2016, Sharks owner Jeff Bouchy announced the team has joined the newly formed National Arena League (NAL). He also announced the hiring for former Toronto Phantoms head coach Mark Stoute as their second head coach in franchise history, replacing interim head coach Bob Landsee. After going undefeated through eight games, Stoute was fired. Siaha Burley was immediately hired as his replacement after serving as the offensive coordinator of the AFL's Cleveland Gladiators. The Sharks nearly went undefeated throughout their inaugural NAL season before losing their home finale against the Monterrey Steel 44–37. They avenged the loss by beating the Steel one week later in the playoff semifinal 43–32 to advance to the championship game. The Sharks won the inaugural NAL championship game 27–21 over the Columbus Lions.

In 2018, the Jacksonville Sharks went 10–7 under returning head coach Burley. The Sharks advanced to the National Arena League playoffs, but lost on the road to the Carolina Cobras 73–48. The Cobras won the 2018 championship over the Columbus Lions. Following the season, operating manager and majority owner Jeff Bouchy resigned and sold his interest in the team to the other owners on March 11, 2019. The Sharks added another minority owner in Nick Furris on April 26, 2019. The Sharks finished the 2019 season with a 13–1 record and won the league championship.

After the 2019 season, the Sharks did not come to terms with head coach Burley on a contract extension and replaced him with former Maine Mammoths head coach James Fuller. The 2020 season was then cancelled due to the onset of the COVID-19 pandemic. When the league returned in the delayed and shortened 2021 season, Fuller led the team to a 2–6 record and the Sharks missed the playoffs for the first time since joining the NAL. Burley was re-hired as head coach for the 2022 season.

The Sharks won the league championship in the 2023 season.

=== Indoor Football League (2024–present) ===
On August 22, 2023, the Sharks announced they were joining the Indoor Football League (IFL) beginning with the 2024 season.

== Arena ==
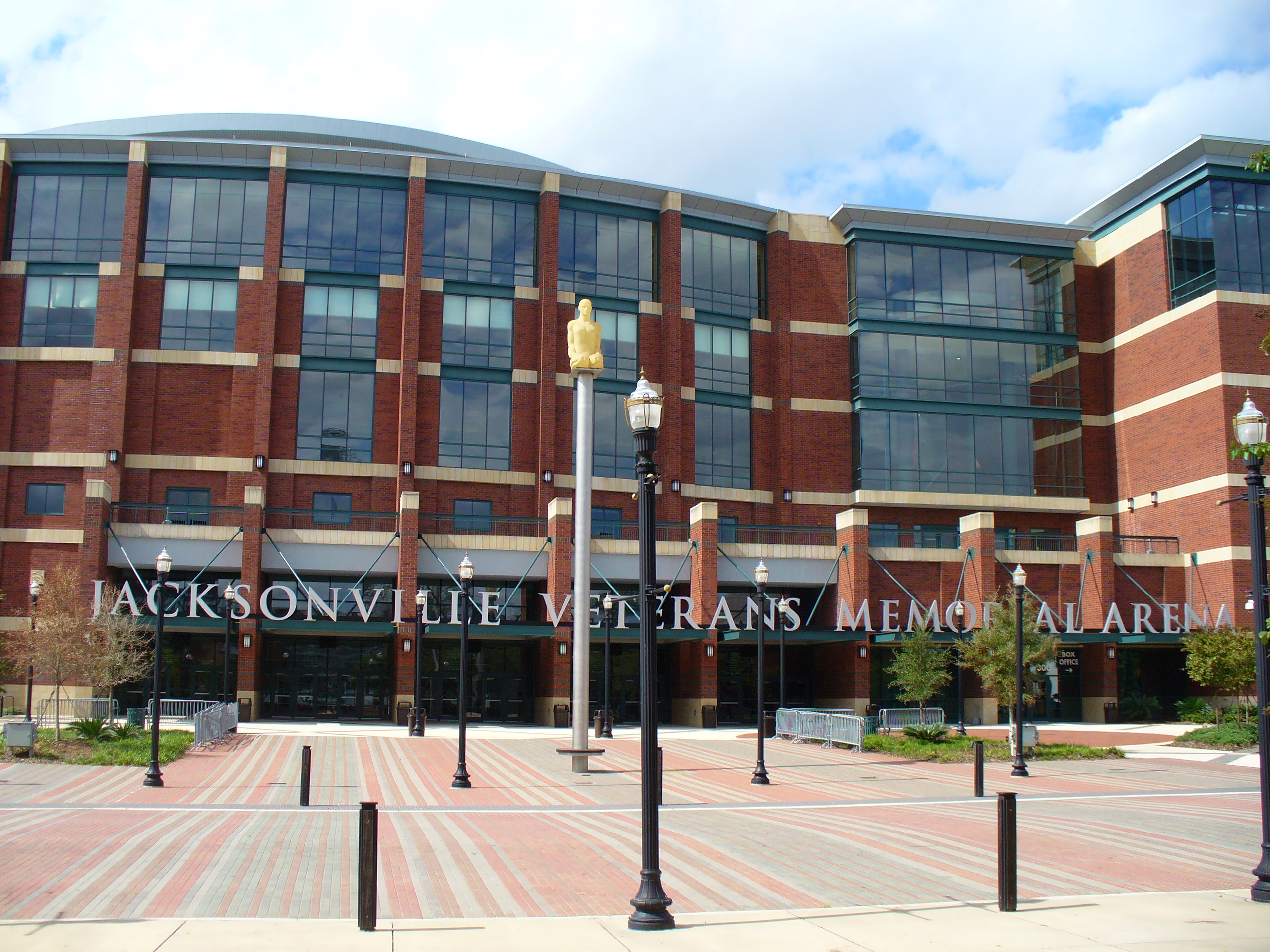
VyStar Veterans Memorial Arena, home of the Sharks

Since 2010, the Sharks' home arena has been VyStar Veterans Memorial Arena, a $130 million facility opened in 2003. Capacity for arena football games is 13,011.

== Notable players ==
=== Individual awards ===
AFL Offensive Player of the Year
Season	Player	Position
2011	Aaron Garcia	QB
2016	Joe Hills	WR

AFL Defensive Lineman of the Year
Season	Player	Position
2015	Joe Sykes	DL

NAL Defensive Player of the Year
Season	Player	Position
2017	Charlie Hunt	LB

NAL Special Teams Player of the Year
Season	Player	Position
2017	Nick Belcher	K

=== All-Arena players ===
The following Sharks players have been named to All-Arena Teams:

- QB Aaron Garcia (1)
- FB Derrick Ross (1)
- WR Jeron Harvey (1), Tiger Jones (1), Joe Hills (2)
- OL Randy Degg (1), Moqut Ruffins (1), Cornelius Lewis (1)
- DL Derrick Summers (1), Scooter Berry (1), Jerry Turner (1), Joe Sykes (1)
- LB Aaron Robbins (2), Alvin Ray Jackson (1), Dexter Jackson (1)
- DB Micheaux Robinson (2), Terrance Smith (1), Greg Reid (2)

=== All-Ironman players ===
The following Sharks players have been named to All-Ironman Teams:

- WR/KR Jeff Hughley (1)
- WR/DB Terrance Smith (1)

=== All-NAL players ===
The following Sharks players have been named to All-NAL Teams:

- RB Derrick Ross (1)
- WR Moe Williams (1)
- OT Cornelius Lewis (1), Moqut Ruffins (1)
- C A. J. Harmon (1)
- DL Jeremiah Price (1), Daylou Pierson (1)
- LB Charles Hunt (1)
- DB Erick McIntosh (1), Marvin Ross (1), Micheaux Robinson (1)
- K Nick Belcher (1),

== Notable coaches ==
=== Head coaches ===
Note: Statistics are correct through the 2022 National Arena League season.

Name	Term	Regular season				Playoffs		Awards
Name	Term	W	L	T	Win%	W	L	Awards
Les Moss	2010–2016	70	50	0	.583	7	4	Coach of the Year (2010)
Bob Landsee	2016 (interim)	2	0	0	1.000	1	1	
Mark Stoute	2017	8	0	0	1.000	—	—	
Siaha Burley	2017–2019, 2022	26	8	0	.765	4	1	
James Fuller	2020–2021	2	6	0	1.000	—	—	
Jason Gibson	2023–present	38	27	0	.585	2	2	

== Season-by-season results ==
ArenaBowl champions	ArenaBowl appearance	Division champions	Playoff berth	NAL champions

Season	League	Conference	Division	Regular season			Postseason results
Season	League	Conference	Division	Finish	Wins	Losses	Postseason results
2010	AFL	American	South	1st	12	4	Lost Conference Semifinals (Orlando) 69–73
2011	AFL	American	South	1st	14	4	Won Conference Semifinals (Orlando) 63–48; Won Conference Championship (Georgia) 64–55; Won ArenaBowl XXIV (Arizona) 73–70
2012	AFL	American	South	1st	10	8	Won Conference Semifinals (Georgia) 58–56; Lost Conference Championship (Philadelphia) 34–89
2013	AFL	American	South	1st	12	6	Won Conference Semifinals (Tampa Bay) 69–62; Lost Conference Championship (Philadelphia) 59–75
2014	AFL	American	South	3rd	7	11	
2015	AFL	American	South	2nd	10	8	Won Conference Semifinals (Orlando) 55–33; Won Conference Championship (Philadelphia) 61–56; Lost ArenaBowl XXVIII (San Jose) 47–68
2016	AFL	American	—	2nd	7	9	Won Conference Semifinals (Orlando) 69–68 (OT); Lost Conference Championship (Philadelphia) 50–55
2017	NAL	—	—	1st	11	1	Won Semifinal (Monterrey) 43–32; Won NAL Championship (Columbus) 27–21
2018	NAL	—	—	3rd	10	6	Lost Semifinal (Carolina) 48–73
2019	NAL	—	—	1st	13	1	Won Semifinal (Columbus) 67–43; Won NAL Championship (Carolina) 52–48
2020	NAL	—	—	Season cancelled due to COVID-19 pandemic			
2021	NAL	—	—	6th	2	6	
2022	NAL	—	—	4th	7	7	Lost Semifinal (Albany) 67–68
2023	NAL	—	—	1st	10	3	Won Semifinal (Orlando) 62-18; Won NAL Championship (Carolina) 54-45
2024	IFL	Eastern	—	6th	5	11	
2025	IFL	Eastern	—	4th	10	6	Lost first round (Quad City) 41–57
2026	IFL	Eastern	—	2nd	11	5	Lost first round (Tulsa) 28–31
Total					151	96	(includes only regular season)
Total					14	9	(includes only the postseason)
Total					165	105	(includes both regular season and postseason)
