= 2015 Las Vegas Outlaws season =

Arena Football League team season

2015 Las Vegas Outlaws (arena football) season
- Owner: Vince Neil
- General manager: Bob Hewko
- Head coach: Aaron Garcia
- Home stadium: Thomas & Mack Center

Results
- Record: 5–12–1
- Division place: 2nd NC West
- Playoffs: did not qualify

The 2015 Las Vegas Outlaws season was the first and only season for the expansion franchise in the Arena Football League. The team was coached by Aaron Garcia and played their home games at Thomas & Mack Center. The Outlaws finished their inaugural season 5–12–1, with the tie being a cancelled home game against the VooDoo. Though they qualified for the playoffs, the league announced on August 9 that the Outlaws (along with the VooDoo) would cease operations effective immediately, and would therefore not participate in the playoffs.

== Offseason ==
=== 2014 expansion draft ===
Draft order	Player name	Position	Height	Weight	2014 team
Round	Player name	Position	Height	Weight	2014 team
1	Tanner Varner	Linebacker	6-0	205	Orlando Predators
2	Ernest Owusu	Defensive lineman	6-4	270	San Jose SaberCats
3	Abe Markowitz	Offensive lineman	6-1	305	Portland Thunder
4	Julius Williams	Defensive Lineman	6-2	280	Philadelphia Soul
5	Donovan Henley	Defensive back	5-10	180	Arizona Rattlers
6	B. J. Bell	Defensive Lineman	6-3	265	Los Angeles KISS
7	Maurice Williams	Wide receiver	6-1	195	Jacksonville Sharks
8	Jeff Nady	Offensive lineman	6-6	315	San Jose SaberCats
9	Gerald Young	Wide Receiver	5-10	170	Orlando Predators
10	Will Wright	Offensive Lineman	6-2	315	Arizona Rattlers
11	Bert Reed	Wide Receiver	6-1	195	Jacksonville Sharks
12	Robert Rose	Defensive Lineman	6-5	300	Cleveland Gladiators
13	Dion Turner	Defensive back	6-0	200	Portland Thunder

== Standings ==
2015 National Conference standings
Team	Overall			Points			Records			
Team	W	L	T	PCT	PF	PA	DIV	CON	Home	Away
Pacific Division
^{(1)} San Jose SaberCats	17	1	0	.944	1061	662	6–0	13–1	8–1	9–0
^{(3)} Spokane Shock	7	11	0	.389	847	971	2–4	6–8	4–5	3–6
^{(4)} Portland Thunder	5	13	0	.278	819	908	1–5	4–10	5–4	0–9
West Division
^{(2)} Arizona Rattlers	14	4	0	.778	1003	825	5–1	10–4	8–1	6–3
Las Vegas Outlaws	5	12	1	.306	740	909	3–3	5–9	3–5–1	2–7
Los Angeles Kiss	4	14	0	.222	724	915	1–5	4–10	3–6	1–8

== Schedule ==
=== Regular season ===
The 2015 regular season schedule was released on December 19, 2014.

Week	Day	Date	Kickoff	Opponent	Results		Location	Attendance	Report
Week	Day	Date	Kickoff	Opponent	Score	Record	Location	Attendance	Report
1	Monday	March 30	7:30 p.m. PDT	San Jose SaberCats	L 41–59	0–1	Thomas & Mack Center	6,569	
2	Saturday	April 4	7:30 p.m. PDT	Arizona Rattlers	W 70–53	1–1	Thomas & Mack Center	3,327	
3	Saturday	April 11	7:00 p.m. PDT	at Los Angeles KISS	W 61–48	2–1	Honda Center	8,565	
4	Bye								
5	Friday	April 24	5:00 p.m. PDT	at Jacksonville Sharks	L 28–60	2–2	Jacksonville Veterans Memorial Arena	9,682	
6	Monday	May 4	7:30 p.m. PDT	Los Angeles KISS	W 49–16	3–2	Thomas & Mack Center	2,452	
7	Saturday	May 9	7:30 p.m. PDT	at San Jose SaberCats	L 28–61	3–3	SAP Center at San Jose	8,600	
8	Saturday	May 16	6:00 p.m. PDT	at Arizona Rattlers	L 41–60	3–4	Talking Stick Resort Arena	10,130	
9	Saturday	May 23	7:30 p.m. PDT	Spokane Shock	L 56–63	3–5	Thomas & Mack Center	2,273	
10	Saturday	May 30	3:00 p.m. PDT	at Philadelphia Soul	L 43–51	3–6	Boardwalk Hall	6,514	
11	Sunday	June 7	2:00 p.m. PDT	Cleveland Gladiators	L 44–63	3–7	Thomas & Mack Center	3,255	
12	Friday	June 12	7:00 p.m. PDT	at Spokane Shock	W 62–56	4–7	Spokane Veterans Memorial Arena	7,497	
13	Sunday	June 21	2:00 p.m. PDT	San Jose SaberCats	L 31–63	4–8	Thomas & Mack Center	2,166	
14	Sunday	June 28	2:00 p.m. PDT	Portland Thunder	W 48–46	5–8	Thomas & Mack Center	3,497	
15	Bye								
16	Saturday	July 11	6:00 p.m. PDT	at Arizona Rattlers	L 43–57	5–9	Talking Stick Resort Arena	11,891	
17	Saturday	July 18	7:00 p.m. PDT	at Los Angeles KISS	L 27–37	5–10	Honda Center	7,635	
18	Saturday	July 25	7:30 p.m. PDT	New Orleans VooDoo	Game canceled. Result considered a tie.				
19	Saturday	August 1	7:00 p.m. PDT	at Portland Thunder	L 33–64	5–11–1	Moda Center	14,055	
20	Saturday	August 8	7:30 p.m. PDT	Spokane Shock	L 34–51	5–12–1	Thomas & Mack Center	2,166	

== Roster ==
2015 Las Vegas Outlaws roster
Quarterbacks: 12 Sean Brackett; 11 J. J. Raterink; Fullbacks: Currently vacant; Wide receivers: -- Larry Beavers; 18 LaDon Hudson; 1 Clinton Solomon; 21 Doug Williams; 10 Jason Willis	Offensive linemen: 55 Nyere Aumaitre; 60 Terrence Campbell; 71 Kevin Myers; 74 Justin Wells; 54 Zack Williams; 72 Will Wright; Defensive linemen: 23 Terrance Carter; 54 Jabari Fletcher; 95 Matt Hardison; 53 Mike Lewis; 33 Mark Weivoda	Linebackers: 17 Wesley Mauia; Defensive backs: 7 Ray Little; 6 Eddie Moten; 2 Demarcus Robinson; 3 Matt Vinal; Kickers: 14 Ernesto Lacayo	Injured reserve: 99 Junior Aumavae DL; 2 Donovan Henley DB; 78 Jeff Nady OL; 95 Ernest Owusu DL; 6 Wesley Pendleton DB; 19 Tysson Poots WR; 20 Tanner Varner LB; 15 Jomo Wilson WR; League suspension: 62 Brandyn Dombrowski OL; 14 Ross Gornall K; 90 Romelle Jones LB; 91 Brandon Peguese DL; 27 Jamarko Simmons WR; 5 Dee Webb DB; Refuse to report: 23 Myron Lewis DB; -- Abe Markowitz OL; -- Julius Williams DL; Other league exempt: Currently vacant; Inactive reserve: 42 Joe Mortensen FB; 3 Gerald Young WR; Recallable reassignment: Currently vacant; Rookies in italics Roster updated August 6, 2015; 23 Active, 20 Inactive
