= 2015 Arizona Rattlers season =

Indoor football season

- Owner: Ron Shurts
- General manager: Kevin Guy
- Head coach: Kevin Guy
- Home stadium: Talking Stick Resort Arena

Results
- Record: 14–4
- Division place: 1st NC West
- Playoffs: Won National Conference Semifinals 72–41 (Shock); Lost National Conference Championship 67–70 (SaberCats)

The 2015 Arizona Rattlers season was the twenty-third season for the arena football franchise in the Arena Football League. The team was coached by Kevin Guy and played their home games at Talking Stick Resort Arena. The Rattlers finished with a 14–4 record, with two of the losses coming at the hands of the San Jose SaberCats.

== Standings ==
2015 National Conference standings
| Team | Overall | | | Points | | | Records | | | |
| Team | W | L | T | PCT | PF | PA | DIV | CON | Home | Away |
|---|---|---|---|---|---|---|---|---|---|---|
Pacific Division
| ^{(1)} San Jose SaberCats | 17 | 1 | 0 | .944 | 1061 | 662 | 6–0 | 13–1 | 8–1 | 9–0 |
| ^{(3)} Spokane Shock | 7 | 11 | 0 | .389 | 847 | 971 | 2–4 | 6–8 | 4–5 | 3–6 |
| ^{(4)} Portland Thunder | 5 | 13 | 0 | .278 | 819 | 908 | 1–5 | 4–10 | 5–4 | 0–9 |
West Division
| ^{(2)} Arizona Rattlers | 14 | 4 | 0 | .778 | 1003 | 825 | 5–1 | 10–4 | 8–1 | 6–3 |
| Las Vegas Outlaws | 5 | 12 | 1 | .306 | 740 | 909 | 3–3 | 5–9 | 3–5–1 | 2–7 |
| Los Angeles Kiss | 4 | 14 | 0 | .222 | 724 | 915 | 1–5 | 4–10 | 3–6 | 1–8 |

== Schedule ==
=== Regular season ===
The 2015 regular season schedule was released on December 19, 2014.

| Week | Day | Date | Kickoff | Opponent | Results | | Location | Attendance | Report |
| Week | Day | Date | Kickoff | Opponent | Score | Record | Location | Attendance | Report |
|---|---|---|---|---|---|---|---|---|---|
| 1 | Saturday | March 28 | 7:00 p.m. MDT | Spokane Shock | W 60–43 | 1–0 | Talking Stick Resort Arena | 9,455 | |
| 2 | Saturday | April 4 | 8:30 p.m. MDT | at Las Vegas Outlaws | L 53–70 | 1–1 | Thomas & Mack Center | 3,327 | |
| 3 | Saturday | April 11 | 5:00 p.m. MDT | at Cleveland Gladiators | W 49–41 | 2–1 | Quicken Loans Arena | 12,776 | |
| 4 | Saturday | April 18 | 8:00 p.m. MDT | Portland Thunder | W 65–47 | 3–1 | Talking Stick Resort Arena | 8,815 | |
| 5 | Saturday | April 25 | 8:00 p.m. MDT | at Los Angeles KISS | W 68–30 | 4–1 | Honda Center | 7,900 | |
| 6 | Saturday | May 2 | 7:00 p.m. MDT | San Jose SaberCats | L 34–56 | 4–2 | Talking Stick Resort Arena | 8,249 | |
| 7 | Saturday | May 9 | 7:00 p.m. MDT | at New Orleans VooDoo | W 47–39 | 5–2 | Smoothie King Center | 4,015 | |
| 8 | Saturday | May 16 | 7:00 p.m. MDT | Las Vegas Outlaws | W 60–41 | 6–2 | Talking Stick Resort Arena | 10,130 | |
| 9 | Bye | | | | | | | | |
| 10 | Saturday | May 30 | 8:00 p.m. MDT | at Spokane Shock | W 59–47 | 7–2 | Spokane Veterans Memorial Arena | 7,884 | |
| 11 | Saturday | June 6 | 7:00 p.m. MDT | Tampa Bay Storm | W 69–46 | 8–2 | Talking Stick Resort Arena | 12,304 | |
| 12 | Friday | June 12 | 7:30 p.m. MDT | at Portland Thunder | W 69–42 | 9–2 | Moda Center | 9,435 | |
| 13 | Saturday | June 20 | 7:00 p.m. MDT | Orlando Predators | W 55–35 | 10–2 | Talking Stick Resort Arena | 11,673 | |
| 14 | Saturday | June 27 | 8:00 p.m. MDT | at Los Angeles KISS | W 49–43 | 11–2 | Honda Center | 7,832 | |
| 15 | Bye | | | | | | | | |
| 16 | Saturday | July 11 | 7:00 p.m. MDT | Las Vegas Outlaws | W 57–43 | 12–2 | Talking Stick Resort Arena | 11,891 | |
| 17 | Friday | July 17 | 8:00 p.m. MDT | at Spokane Shock | L 45–52 | 12–3 | Spokane Veterans Memorial Arena | 7,938 | |
| 18 | Sunday | July 26 | 4:00 p.m. MDT | Los Angeles KISS | W 68–55 | 13–3 | Talking Stick Resort Arena | 11,106 | |
| 19 | Friday | July 31 | 8:30 p.m. MDT | at San Jose SaberCats | L 29–56 | 13–4 | SAP Center at San Jose | 10,633 | |
| 20 | Saturday | August 8 | 7:00 p.m. MDT | Portland Thunder | W 67–39 | 14–4 | Talking Stick Resort Arena | 12,687 | |

=== Playoffs ===
| Round | Day | Date | Kickoff | Opponent | Results | Location | Attendance | Report |
|---|---|---|---|---|---|---|---|---|
| NC Semifinals | Saturday | August 15 | 6:00 p.m. PDT | Spokane Shock | W 72–41 | Talking Stick Resort Arena | 10,322 | |
| NC Championship | Saturday | August 22 | 5:00 p.m. PDT | at San Jose SaberCats | L 67–70 | Stockton Arena | | |

== Roster ==
2015 Arizona Rattlers roster
| Quarterbacks: 3 Shane Boyd; 10 Nick Davila; Fullbacks: 9 Mykel Benson; Wide receivers: 12 Dan Buckner; 81 Chase Deadder; 15 Kerry Reed; 5 Quentin Sims; 1 Rod Windsor | Offensive linemen: 60 Sherman Carter; 55 Brennen Carvalho; 63 Derek Dennis; -- Mark Jackson; 71 Darius Morris; Defensive linemen: 6 Cliff Dukes; 77 Anttaj Hawthorne; 90 Mike McAdoo; 92 Anthony McCloud; 70 Marcus Pittman | Linebackers: 94 Tyre Glasper; Defensive backs: 11 Arkeith Brown; 19 Marquis Floyd; 20 Jeremy Kellem; 25 Ben Wells; Kickers: 14 Alex Zendejas | Injured reserve: 23 Antonio Dennard DB; 74 Andrew Miller OL; 17 Fabrizio Scaccia K; 65 Will Simmons OL; 87 Chris Summers WR; 8 Markee White WR; 68 Keith Williams OL; League suspension: 47 Trent Allmang-Wilder DL; -- B. J. Butler FB; 16 B. J. Coleman QB; 26 Antonio Fenelus DB; 73 Joe Gibbs OL; -- Vic Hall DB; 83 Dwight Jones WR; 90 Quinn Pitcock DL; 65 Isaac Remington DL; 91 David Sumter DL; 17 Duwyce Wilson WR; Other league exempt: 7 A. J. Cruz DB; -- Mike Golic, Jr. OL; -- Travis Hawkins DB; 69 Michael Huey OL; 97 Leon Mackey DL; -- Tobais Palmer WR; -- Bryn Renner QB; Refused to report: -- J. J. Unga OL; Inactive reserve: 18 Ronnell Pompey WR; 21 Markus Smith DB; Recallable reassignment: Currently vacant; Rookies in italics Roster updated August 20, 2015; 24 Active, 28 Inactive |
