= 2015 Spokane Shock season =

Arena Football League team season

- Owner: Nader Naini
- General manager: Ryan Eucker
- Head coach: Andy Olson
- Home stadium: Spokane Veterans Memorial Arena

Results
- Record: 7–11
- Division place: 2nd NC Pacific
- Playoffs: Lost Conference Semifinal (Rattlers) 41-72

The 2015 Spokane Shock season was the tenth season for the arena football franchise, and the sixth in the Arena Football League. The team was coached by Andy Olson and played their home games at the Spokane Veterans Memorial Arena. The Shock finished with a 7–11 record, but finished second in the Pacific division for a second straight year and once again qualified for the playoffs.

== Standings ==
2015 National Conference standings
Team	Overall			Points			Records			
Team	W	L	T	PCT	PF	PA	DIV	CON	Home	Away
Pacific Division
^{(1)} San Jose SaberCats	17	1	0	.944	1061	662	6–0	13–1	8–1	9–0
^{(3)} Spokane Shock	7	11	0	.389	847	971	2–4	6–8	4–5	3–6
^{(4)} Portland Thunder	5	13	0	.278	819	908	1–5	4–10	5–4	0–9
West Division
^{(2)} Arizona Rattlers	14	4	0	.778	1003	825	5–1	10–4	8–1	6–3
Las Vegas Outlaws	5	12	1	.306	740	909	3–3	5–9	3–5–1	2–7
Los Angeles Kiss	4	14	0	.222	724	915	1–5	4–10	3–6	1–8

== Schedule ==
=== Regular season ===
The 2015 regular season schedule was released on December 19, 2014.

Week	Day	Date	Kickoff	Opponent	Results		Location	Attendance	Report
Week	Day	Date	Kickoff	Opponent	Score	Record	Location	Attendance	Report
1	Saturday	March 28	6:30 p.m. PDT	at Arizona Rattlers	L 43–60	0–1	Talking Stick Resort Arena	9,455	
2	Saturday	April 4	7:00 p.m. PDT	Philadelphia Soul	L 43–54	0–2	Spokane Veterans Memorial Arena	8,635	
3	Thursday	April 9	7:00 p.m. PDT	at Portland Thunder	L 43–47	0–3	Moda Center	5,746	
4	Bye								
5	Saturday	April 25	7:00 p.m. PDT	Orlando Predators	W 56–55 (OT)	1–3	Spokane Veterans Memorial Arena	8,906	
6	Saturday	May 2	6:00 p.m. PDT	at New Orleans VooDoo	L 63–66	1–4	Smoothie King Center	3,785	
7	Friday	May 8	7:00 p.m. PDT	Los Angeles KISS	W 68–46	2–4	Spokane Veterans Memorial Arena	7,960	
8	Saturday	May 16	7:00 p.m. PDT	San Jose SaberCats	L 28–83	2–5	Spokane Veterans Memorial Arena	7,519	
9	Saturday	May 23	7:30 p.m. PDT	at Las Vegas Outlaws	W 63–56	3–5	Thomas & Mack Center	2,273	
10	Saturday	May 30	7:00 p.m. PDT	Arizona Rattlers	L 47–59	3–6	Spokane Veterans Memorial Arena	7,884	
11	Friday	June 5	7:30 p.m. PDT	at San Jose SaberCats	L 26–55	3–7	SAP Center at San Jose	7,662	
12	Friday	June 12	7:00 p.m. PDT	Las Vegas Outlaws	L 56–62	3–8	Spokane Veterans Memorial Arena	7,497	
13	Sunday	June 21	7:00 p.m. PDT	at Portland Thunder	W 69–54	4–8	Moda Center	7,123	
14	Friday	June 26	7:00 p.m. PDT	San Jose SaberCats	L 27–62	4–9	Spokane Veterans Memorial Arena	7,618	
15	Bye								
16	Sunday	July 12	3:00 p.m. PDT	at Los Angeles KISS	L 28–34	4–10	Honda Center	7,730	
17	Friday	July 17	7:00 p.m. PDT	Arizona Rattlers	W 52–45	5–10	Spokane Veterans Memorial Arena	7,938	
18	Saturday	July 25	7:00 p.m. PDT	Portland Thunder	W 42–40	6–10	Spokane Veterans Memorial Arena	8,357	
19	Saturday	August 1	4:00 p.m. PDT	at Cleveland Gladiators	L 42–59	6–11	Quicken Loans Arena	11,674	
20	Saturday	August 8	7:30 p.m. PDT	at Las Vegas Outlaws	W 51–34	7–11	Thomas & Mack Center	2,166	

=== Playoffs ===
Round	Day	Date	Kickoff	Opponent	Results	Location	Attendance	Report
NC Semifinals	Saturday	August 15	6:00 p.m. PDT	at Arizona Rattlers	L 41–72	Talking Stick Resort Arena	10,322	

== Roster ==
2015 Spokane Shock roster
Quarterbacks: 12 Arvell Nelson; 8 Warren Smith; Fullbacks: 42 Rory Nixon; Wide receivers: 5 Anthony Amos; 1 Braylon Bell; -- Josh Bush; 2 Jabin Sambrano; 81 Nick Truesdell	Offensive linemen: 75 Patrick Afif; 74 Larry Banks; 66 Deveric Gallington; 51 Sam Tupua; Defensive linemen: 36 Bryson Kelly; 44 James Ruffin; 56 Derrick Summers; 67 Terrance Taylor	Linebackers: 11 Micah King; 50 Kevin McCullough; Defensive backs: 3 Ruschard Dodd-Masters; 9 Sergio Gilliam; 26 Mike McMillan; 31 Jon Setzer; 23 Jeff Richards; Kickers: 6 Taylor Rowan	Injured reserve: 4 Samuel Charles WR; 22 Carson Coffman QB; 62 Dominique Duster DL; -- Will Hunt DL; 1 Sam Pope DB; 7 Mike Washington WR; Other League Exempt: 90 Kourtnei Brown DL; 32 Antareis Bryan DB; 12 Kamar Jorden WR; 24 Lowell Rose DB; League Suspension: -- Andy Erickson WR; 72 Tavaris Jeffries OL; 14 Christian Wise DB; Inactive reserve: 13 Rashaad Carter WR; Refuse to report: 21 Bryant Nnabuife DB; Recallable reassignment: Currently vacant; Rookies in italics Roster updated August 14, 2015; 24 Active, 15 Inactive → More rosters
