= 2015 Portland Thunder season =

Arena Football League team season

- Owner: Terry Emmert
- General manager: Meadow Lemon
- Head coach: Mike Hohensee
- Home stadium: Moda Center

Results
- Record: 5–13
- Division place: 3rd NC Pacific
- Playoffs: Lost NC Semifinals (SaberCats) 28–55

The 2015 Portland Thunder season was the second season for the arena football franchise in the Arena Football League. The team was coached by Mike Hohensee and played their home games at the Moda Center. The Thunder finished third in the Pacific division and 5–13 for the second straight year, and were also one of two teams to go winless on the road. Despite not qualifying for the playoffs with their win–loss record, because the league elected to cease operations of the Las Vegas Outlaws, who had finished ahead of Portland for the final playoff berth in the National Conference, Portland was awarded a playoff berth in their place. They were defeated in the conference semifinals by the San Jose SaberCats, 55–28.

== Standings ==
2015 National Conference standings
Team	Overall			Points			Records			
Team	W	L	T	PCT	PF	PA	DIV	CON	Home	Away
Pacific Division
^{(1)} San Jose SaberCats	17	1	0	.944	1061	662	6–0	13–1	8–1	9–0
^{(3)} Spokane Shock	7	11	0	.389	847	971	2–4	6–8	4–5	3–6
^{(4)} Portland Thunder	5	13	0	.278	819	908	1–5	4–10	5–4	0–9
West Division
^{(2)} Arizona Rattlers	14	4	0	.778	1003	825	5–1	10–4	8–1	6–3
Las Vegas Outlaws	5	12	1	.306	740	909	3–3	5–9	3–5–1	2–7
Los Angeles Kiss	4	14	0	.222	724	915	1–5	4–10	3–6	1–8

== Schedule ==
=== Regular season ===
The 2015 regular season schedule was released on December 19, 2014.

Week	Day	Date	Kickoff	Opponent	Results		Location	Attendance	Report
Week	Day	Date	Kickoff	Opponent	Score	Record	Location	Attendance	Report
1	Friday	March 27	7:00 p.m. PDT	Los Angeles KISS	W 42–37	1–0	Moda Center	7,194	
2	Friday	April 3	7:00 p.m. PDT	Tampa Bay Storm	L 48–54	1–1	Moda Center	5,098	
3	Thursday	April 9	7:00 p.m. PDT	Spokane Shock	W 47–43	2–1	Moda Center	5,746	
4	Saturday	April 18	6:00 p.m. PDT	at Arizona Rattlers	L 47–65	2–2	Talking Stick Resort Arena	8,815	
5	Saturday	April 25	7:30 p.m. PDT	at San Jose SaberCats	L 45–64	2–3	SAP Center at San Jose	7,125	
6	Saturday	May 2	3:00 p.m. PDT	at Philadelphia Soul	L 35–52	2–4	Wells Fargo Center	7,011	
7	Bye								
8	Saturday	May 16	7:00 p.m. PDT	Los Angeles KISS	W 63–47	3–4	Moda Center	10,023	
9	Saturday	May 23	4:00 p.m. PDT	at Orlando Predators	L 43–69	3–5	Amway Center	10,583	
10	Saturday	May 30	3:00 p.m. PDT	San Jose SaberCats	L 42–61	3–6	Moda Center	8,815	
11	Sunday	June 7	3:00 p.m. PDT	at Los Angeles KISS	L 40–52	3–7	Honda Center	7,345	
12	Friday	June 12	7:00 p.m. PDT	Arizona Rattlers	L 42–69	3–8	Moda Center	9,435	
13	Sunday	June 21	7:00 p.m. PDT	Spokane Shock	L 54–69	3–9	Moda Center	7,123	
14	Sunday	June 28	2:00 p.m. PDT	at Las Vegas Outlaws	L 46–48	3–10	Thomas & Mack Center	3,497	
15	Bye								
16	Saturday	July 11	7:00 p.m. PDT	Jacksonville Sharks	W 72–48	4–10	Moda Center	7,123	
17	Saturday	July 18	7:30 p.m. PDT	at San Jose SaberCats	L 49–55 (OT)	4–11	SAP Center at San Jose	9,211	
18	Saturday	July 25	7:00 p.m. PDT	at Spokane Shock	L 40–42	4–12	Spokane Veterans Memorial Arena	8,357	
19	Saturday	August 1	7:00 p.m. PDT	Las Vegas Outlaws	W 64–33	5–12	Moda Center	14,055	
20	Saturday	August 8	6:00 p.m. PDT	at Arizona Rattlers	L 39–67	5–13	Talking Stick Resort Arena	12,687	

=== Playoffs ===
Round	Day	Date	Kickoff	Opponent	Results	Location	Attendance	Report
NC Semifinals	Friday	August 14	7:30 p.m. PDT	at San Jose SaberCats	L 28–55	SAP Center at San Jose	10,060	

== Final roster ==
2015 Portland Thunder roster
Quarterbacks: 18 Alex Carder; 3 Kyle Rowley; Fullbacks: Currently vacant; Wide receivers: 15 Perez Ashford; 2 Duane Brooks; 12 Jamar Howard; 5 V'Keon Lacey; 6 Jared Perry; 14 Maurice Williams	Offensive linemen: 79 John Collins; 73 Sam Longo; 70 John Martinez; 66 Ed Ta'amu; Defensive linemen: 45 Adrian Hamilton; 7 Marquis Jackson; 8 K. C. Obi; 52 Frank Trotter	Linebackers: 11 Dexter Davis Jr.; 99 Robert Hayes; Defensive backs: 16 De'Mon Glanton; 21 Dwight McLean; 20 Bryce Peila; 13 Matt Pierce; 10 Varmah Sonie; Kickers: 23 Zach Ramirez	Injured reserve: 9 Jake McDonough DL; 75 Jordan Mudge OL; 6 Okechukwu Okoroha DB; 32 Brandon Tett LB; 1 Darron Thomas QB; 28 Remond Willis LB; Other League Exempt: 8 Douglas McNeil III WR; 13 Eric Rogers WR; -- Jason Slowey OL; -- Trent Steelman WR; League suspension: 16 Quincy Butler DB; 66 Stanley Daniels OL; 23 Coryell Judie DB; 14 Jeffrey Soloman WR; 70 Nick Torresso OL; Inactive reserve: Currently vacant; Team suspension: 11 Brady Beeson K; 24 Andre Martin DB; 4 Osagie Odiase DB; Refused to report: Currently facant; Recallable reassignment: Currently vacant; Rookies in italics Roster updated August 12, 2015; 24 Active, 18 Inactive → More rosters
