= Jamaal Fudge =

American gridiron football player (born 1983)

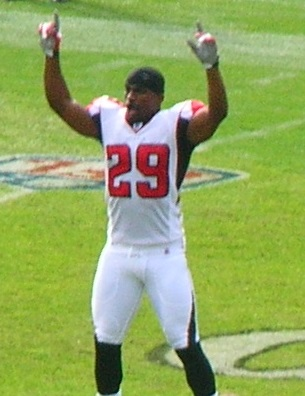
- Fudge in 2008 with the Atlanta Falcons

No. 42, 23, 29, 27
- Position: Defensive back

Personal information
- Born: May 17, 1983 (age 43); Jacksonville, Florida, U.S.
- Listed height: 5 ft 9 in (1.75 m)
- Listed weight: 196 lb (89 kg)

Career information
- High school: Edward H. White (Jacksonville)
- College: Clemson
- NFL draft: 2006: undrafted

Career history
- Jacksonville Jaguars (2006–2007); Atlanta Falcons (2008–2009); Saskatchewan Roughriders (2011); New Orleans VooDoo (2012); Jacksonville Sharks (2013)

Career NFL statistics
- Total tackles: 27
- Forced fumbles: 1
- Fumble recoveries: 1
- Pass deflections: 2
- Interceptions: 1
- Stats at Pro Football Reference

Career AFL statistics
- Total tackles: 46
- Sacks: 1
- Forced fumbles: 4
- Pass deflections: 3
- Interceptions: 2
- Stats at ArenaFan.com
- Stats at CFL.ca (archive)

Jamaal Jay Fudge (born May 17, 1983) is an American former professional football player who was a defensive back in the National Football League (NFL). He played college football for the Clemson Tigers and was signed by the Jacksonville Jaguars as an undrafted free agent in 2006. Fudge also played in the NFL for the Atlanta Falcons. On December 5, 2012, he signed a one-year contract for the 2013 Arena Football League season with the Jacksonville Sharks now he is now the head coach at North Florida educational institute

== Early life ==
Fudge attended Edward H. White High School in Jacksonville, Florida. He along with Dee Webb were elected to Ed White's Sports Wall of Fame in the same year.

== Professional career ==
=== Jacksonville Jaguars ===
Fudge was signed by the Jacksonville Jaguars as an undrafted free agent in 2006. He was cut by the Jaguars in training camp 2008.

=== Atlanta Falcons ===
Fudge was signed by the Atlanta Falcons after he was cut by the Jacksonville Jaguars. He was waived on September 7, 2009, after spending the 2008 season with Atlanta. He was re-signed on October 20, when Brian Williams was placed on injured reserve.

=== Saskatchewan Roughriders ===
In October 2011, Fudge signed with the Saskatchewan Roughriders to the team's practice roster.

=== Jacksonville Sharks ===
Fudge signed with the Jacksonville Sharks for the 2013 season.

== Coaching career ==
Fudge continues to coach in the greater Jacksonville area as the head coach of football for North Florida Educational Institute.
