= Jomo =

Jomo may refer to:

== People ==
- Jomo (given name), an African masculine given name
- Jomo Sono (born 1955), South African soccer club owner, coach and former player Ephraim Matsilela Sono
- nickname of Moemedi Moatlhaping (born 1985), Botswanan footballer
- JoMo (born 1979), nickname of professional wrestler John Morrison
- JoMo (born 1961), stage name of French/Esperanto musician Jean-Marc Leclercq

== Other uses ==
- Jomo (crater), a small lunar crater
- Jōmō Line, a railway line in Gunma Prefecture, operated by Jōmō Electric Railway Company
- Jomo Cosmos F.C., a South African football club
- Jōmō, a nickname for Gunma Prefecture
- JOMO, a brand used for Japan Energy filling stations
