= Justin Wells =

Justin Wells may refer to:

- Justin Wells (American football)
- Justin Wells (musician)
