= 2015 Los Angeles Kiss season =

Arena Football League team season

- Owner: Gene Simmons; Paul Stanley; Doc McGhee; Brett Bouchy; June Jones
- Head coach: Bob McMillen
- Home stadium: Honda Center

Results
- Record: 4–14
- Division place: 3rd NC West
- Playoffs: Did not qualify

The 2015 Los Angeles Kiss season was the second season for the arena football franchise in the Arena Football League. The team was coached by Bob McMillen and played their home games at Honda Center. After a disappointing 0-9 start, the Kiss won four out of their last nine games, including a road upset of the Sabercats, who had entered the game 11-0. Despite the strong finish to improve to 4-14, the Kiss failed to make the playoffs.

== Standings ==
2015 National Conference standings
| Team | Overall | | | Points | | | Records | | | |
| Team | W | L | T | PCT | PF | PA | DIV | CON | Home | Away |
|---|---|---|---|---|---|---|---|---|---|---|
Pacific Division
| ^{(1)} San Jose SaberCats | 17 | 1 | 0 | .944 | 1061 | 662 | 6–0 | 13–1 | 8–1 | 9–0 |
| ^{(3)} Spokane Shock | 7 | 11 | 0 | .389 | 847 | 971 | 2–4 | 6–8 | 4–5 | 3–6 |
| ^{(4)} Portland Thunder | 5 | 13 | 0 | .278 | 819 | 908 | 1–5 | 4–10 | 5–4 | 0–9 |
West Division
| ^{(2)} Arizona Rattlers | 14 | 4 | 0 | .778 | 1003 | 825 | 5–1 | 10–4 | 8–1 | 6–3 |
| Las Vegas Outlaws | 5 | 12 | 1 | .306 | 740 | 909 | 3–3 | 5–9 | 3–5–1 | 2–7 |
| Los Angeles Kiss | 4 | 14 | 0 | .222 | 724 | 915 | 1–5 | 4–10 | 3–6 | 1–8 |

== Schedule ==
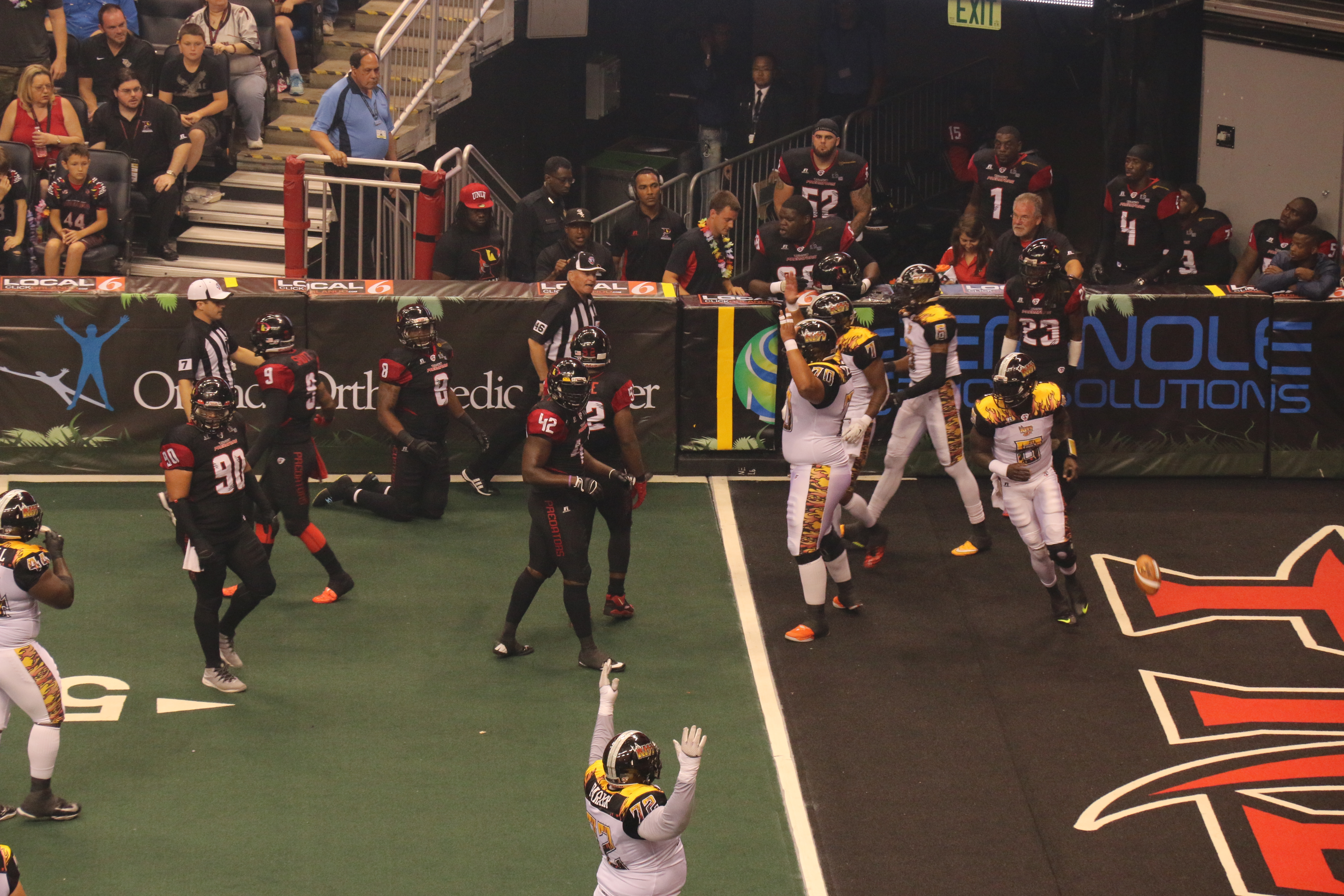
The Kiss playing the Orlando Predators on April 18

=== Regular season ===
The 2015 regular season schedule was released on December 19, 2014.

| Week | Day | Date | Kickoff | Opponent | Results | | Location | Attendance | Report |
| Week | Day | Date | Kickoff | Opponent | Score | Record | Location | Attendance | Report |
|---|---|---|---|---|---|---|---|---|---|
| 1 | Friday | March 27 | 7:00 p.m. PDT | at Portland Thunder | L 37–42 | 0–1 | Moda Center | 7,194 | |
| 2 | Saturday | April 4 | 7:30 p.m. PDT | at San Jose SaberCats | L 28–54 | 0–2 | SAP Center at San Jose | 10,175 | |
| 3 | Saturday | April 11 | 7:00 p.m PDT | Las Vegas Outlaws | L 48–61 | 0–3 | Honda Center | 8,565 | |
| 4 | Saturday | April 18 | 4:00 p.m. PDT | at Orlando Predators | L 48–61 | 0–4 | Amway Center | 11,218 | |
| 5 | Saturday | April 25 | 7:00 p.m. PDT | Arizona Rattlers | L 30–68 | 0–5 | Honda Center | 7,900 | |
| 6 | Monday | May 4 | 4:30 p.m. PDT | at Las Vegas Outlaws | L 16–49 | 0–6 | Thomas & Mack Center | 2,452 | |
| 7 | Friday | May 8 | 7:00 p.m. PDT | at Spokane Shock | L 46–68 | 0–7 | Spokane Veterans Memorial Arena | 7,960 | |
| 8 | Saturday | May 16 | 7:00 p.m. PDT | at Portland Thunder | L 47–63 | 0–8 | Moda Center | 10,023 | |
| 9 | Bye | | | | | | | | |
| 10 | Sunday | May 31 | 3:00 p.m. PDT | Jacksonville Sharks | L 35–41 | 0–9 | Honda Center | 8,235 | |
| 11 | Sunday | June 7 | 3:00 p.m. PDT | Portland Thunder | W 52–40 | 1–9 | Honda Center | 7,345 | |
| 12 | Saturday | June 13 | 7:30 p.m. PDT | at San Jose SaberCats | W 48–42 (OT) | 2–9 | SAP Center at San Jose | 9,132 | |
| 13 | Saturday | June 20 | 7:00 p.m. PDT | Philadelphia Soul | L 48–56 | 2–10 | Honda Center | 6,122 | |
| 14 | Saturday | June 27 | 7:00 p.m. PDT | Arizona Rattlers | L 43–49 | 2–11 | Honda Center | 7,832 | |
| 15 | Bye | | | | | | | | |
| 16 | Sunday | July 12 | 3:00 p.m. PDT | Spokane Shock | W 34–28 | 3–11 | Honda Center | 7,730 | |
| 17 | Saturday | July 18 | 7:00 p.m. PDT | Las Vegas Outlaws | W 37–27 | 4–11 | Honda Center | 7,635 | |
| 18 | Sunday | July 26 | 3:00 p.m. PDT | at Arizona Rattlers | L 55–68 | 4–12 | Talking Stick Resort Arena | 11,106 | |
| 19 | Saturday | August 1 | 4:30 p.m. PDT | at Tampa Bay Storm | L 34–38 | 4–13 | Amalie Arena | 16,308 | |
| 20 | Saturday | August 8 | 7:00 p.m. PDT | San Jose SaberCats | L 38–60 | 4–14 | Honda Center | 9,854 | |

== Roster ==
2015 Los Angeles Kiss roster
| Quarterbacks: 14 Joe Clancy; 12 Danny Southwick; Fullbacks: 70 Miles Mason; Wide receivers: 10 L. J. Castile; 11 Tom Gilson; 1 Donovan Morgan; 9 Tim Vizzi | Offensive linemen: 77 Kody Afusia; 72 Anthony Parker; 66 Hamani Stevens; 71 Shannon Tevaga; Defensive linemen: 56 Nekos Brown; 3 Antron Dillon; 90 Logan Harrell; 92 Spencer Myers; 91 Sione Tuihalamaka | Linebackers: 2 Darryl Cato-Bishop; 95 Brenden Daley; Defensive backs: 22 Ter'Ran Benton; 15 Shaine Boyle; 37 Charles Clay; 7 Rayshaun Kizer; Kickers: 48 Andre Heidari | Injured reserve: 64 Chad Anderson OL; 9 Carlton Brown DB; 8 J. T. Gilmore LB; 13 Tyrone Goard WR; 99 Nigel Nicholas DL; 6 Romeo Pellum DB; 4 DeMarco Sampson WR; 34 Laron Scott DB; 9 Jeffrey Solomon WR; 19 Kenny Spencer K; Refuse to report: 22 Terrence Johnson DB; 26 Winston Wright DB; Other League Exempt: 63 Joe Madsen OL; 5 Adrian McPherson QB; -- Ty Nsekhe OL; -- Akwasi Owusu-Ansah DB; -- Kevin Smith WR; League Suspension: -- Lamont Bryant WR; 16 DaJohn Harris DL; -- Louis Holmes DL; 90 Michael Janac DL; -- Zian Jones DL; -- Will Latu OL; -- Raymond Radway WR; 16 Michale Spicer DL; 6 Josh Victorian DB; 72 Julius Wilson OL; Inactive reserve: Currently vacant; Recallable reassignment: Currently vacant; Rookies in italics Roster updated August 6, 2015; 23 Active, 26 Inactive |
