= Nevada football =

Nevada football may refer to:

- Nevada Wolf Pack football, American Football of the University of Nevada, Reno (UNR)
- UNLV Rebels football, American Football of the University of Nevada, Las Vegas (UNLV)
- Las Vegas Bowl, NCAA division I-A postseason collegiate American football bowl game
- Las Vegas Posse, former Canadian Football team in the CFL
- Las Vegas Outlaws (XFL), former American Football team in the XFL
- Las Vegas Outlaws (arena football), former gridiron arena football team in the AFL
- Las Vegas Raiders, proposed team relocation of the American Football team in the NFL
