= Jomo (given name) =

Jomo is an African masculine given name. Notable people with the name include:

- Jomo Kenyatta (circa 1894-1978), first Prime Minister and President of Kenya
- Jomo Kwame Sundaram (born 1952), Malaysian economist
- Jomo Sono (born 1955), South African soccer club owner
- Jomo Thomas (born 1974), American businessman
- Jomo Wilson (born 1983), American Arena Football League player
