= Edward Simmons (painter) =

American painter (1852–1931)

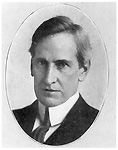
- Born: October 27, 1852; Concord, Massachusetts
- Died: November 17, 1931 (aged 79); Baltimore
- Occupation: Painter/Muralist
- Spouses: Vesta Schallenberger (m. 1883; div. 1903) Alice Ralston Morton (m. 1903)
- Children: William Francis Simmons (1884-1949); George Bradford Simmons (1886-1956)

Edward Emerson Simmons (1852–1931) was an American Impressionist painter, remembered for his mural work.

== Biography ==
His father was a Unitarian minister. He graduated from Harvard College in 1874, and was a pupil of Lefebvre and Boulanger in Paris, where he took a gold medal. In 1894, Simmons was awarded the first commission of the Municipal Art Society, a series of murals—Justice, The Fates, and The Rights of Man—for the interior of the Criminal Courthouse at 100 Centre Street in Manhattan. This court is the criminal branch of New York Supreme Court (the trial court in New York), where many New Yorkers serve on jury duty. Later Simmons decorated the Waldorf Astoria New York hotel, the Library of Congress in Washington, and the mural series "Civilization of the Northwest" in the Minnesota State Capitol rotunda in Saint Paul.

In the year 1914, he travelled with Childe Hassam to view the Arizona desert paintings of the rising California artist Xavier Martinez at his Piedmont studio.

Simmons was a member of the Ten American Painters, who, as a group, seceded from the Society of American Artists. He was also considered a contributor to the style known as the American Renaissance, a movement after the American Civil War that stressed the relationship of architecture, painting, sculpture and interior design.

Simmons published his autobiography in 1922. His life and mural career are chronicled in the short documentary film The Painter in the Old Manse, created by descendant and author, PJ Converse.

== Vandalism of painting ==
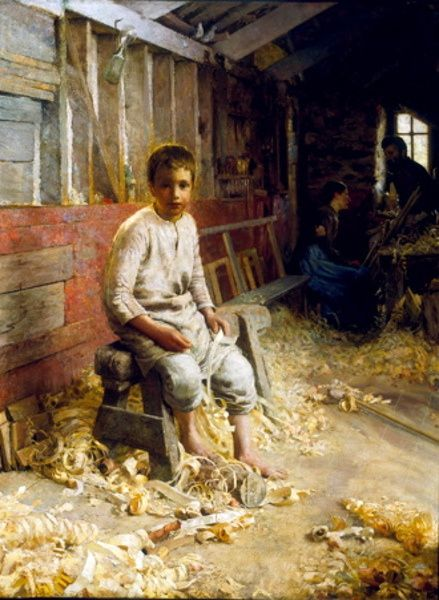
The Carpenter's Son by Edward Simmons 1888-89

In 1996, his painting The Carpenter’s Son, located in the First Unitarian Church in New Bedford, Massachusetts, was yanked from the wall and cut out from its frame. The section depicting Jesus taken cutout and removed with the rest of the painting left lying on the floor. The lost section was found in 2006 rolled up behind a refrigerator when it was being removed from the congregation’s kitchen. The painting was then restored and ownership transferred to the Rotch-Jones-Duff House and Garden Museum.

== Gallery ==
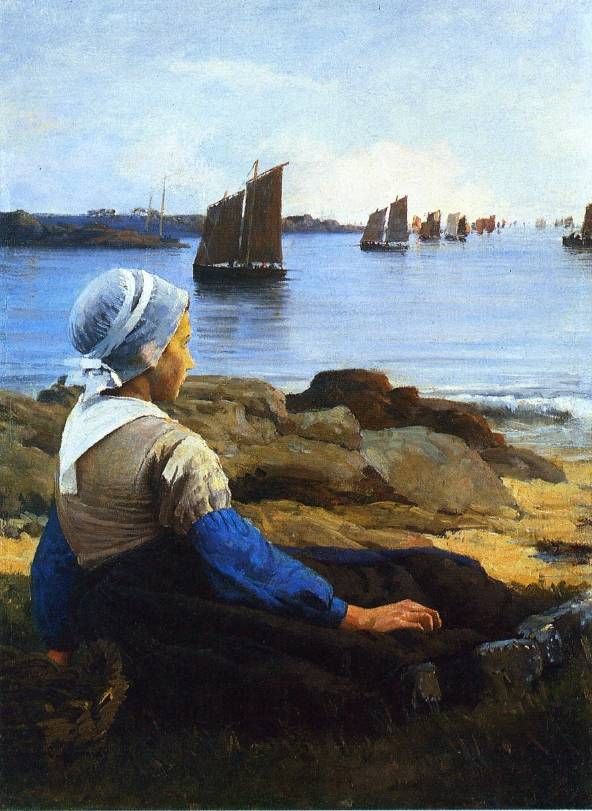
Awaiting his return, 1884, private collection

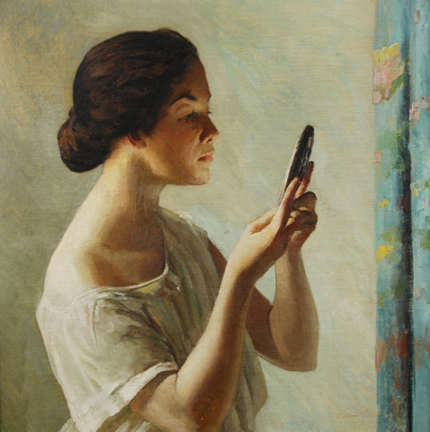
The Reflection

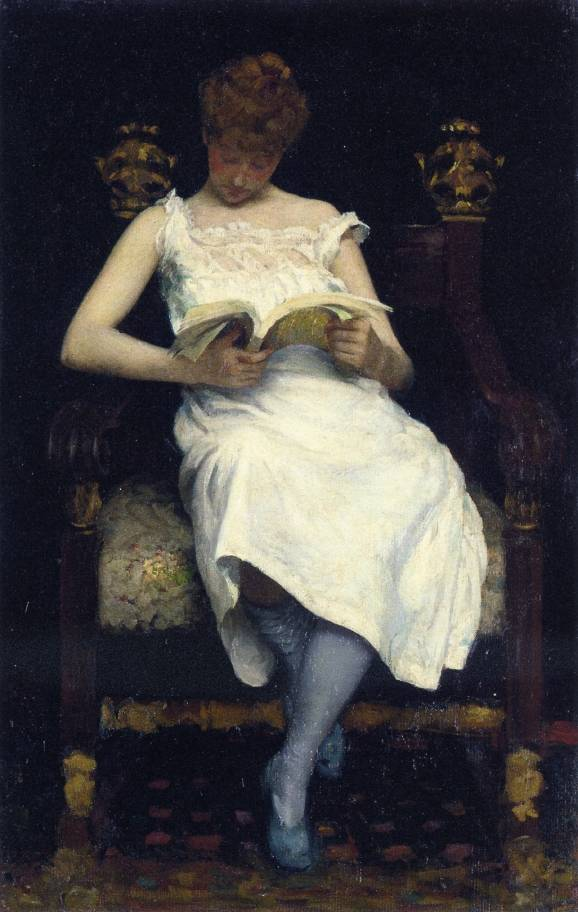
Girl reading 1893, private collection

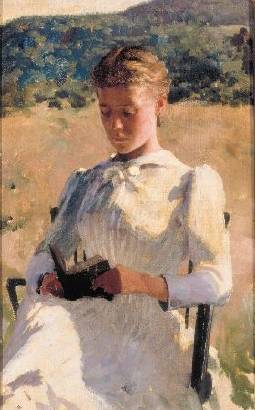
Wrześniowe popołudnie, 1892

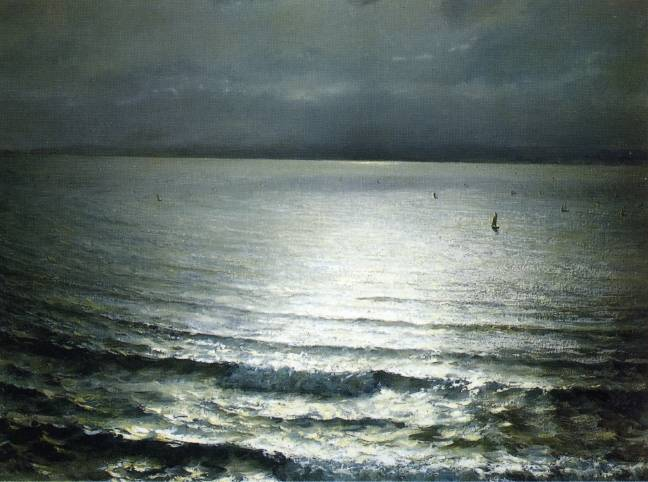
Night

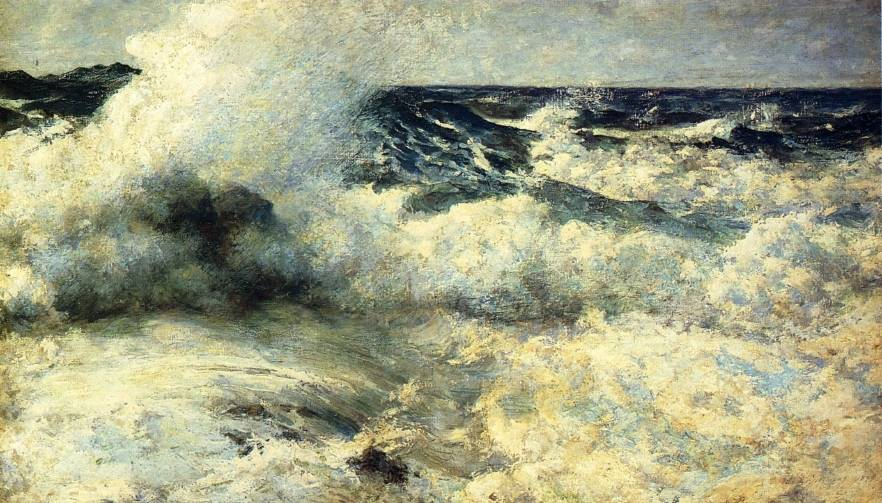
High Sea, 1895

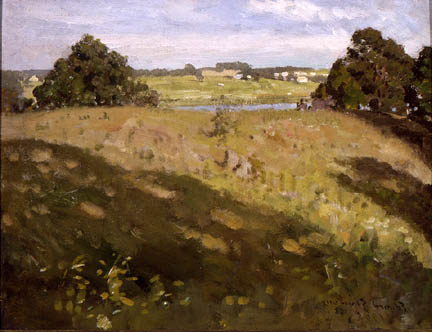
July Afternoon, 1906

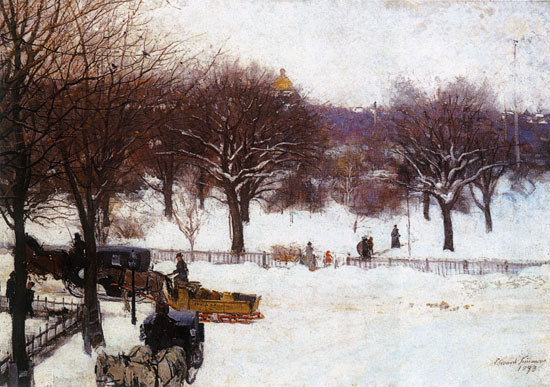
Boston-Public-Gardens, 1910

=== Civilization of the Northwest Gallery ===
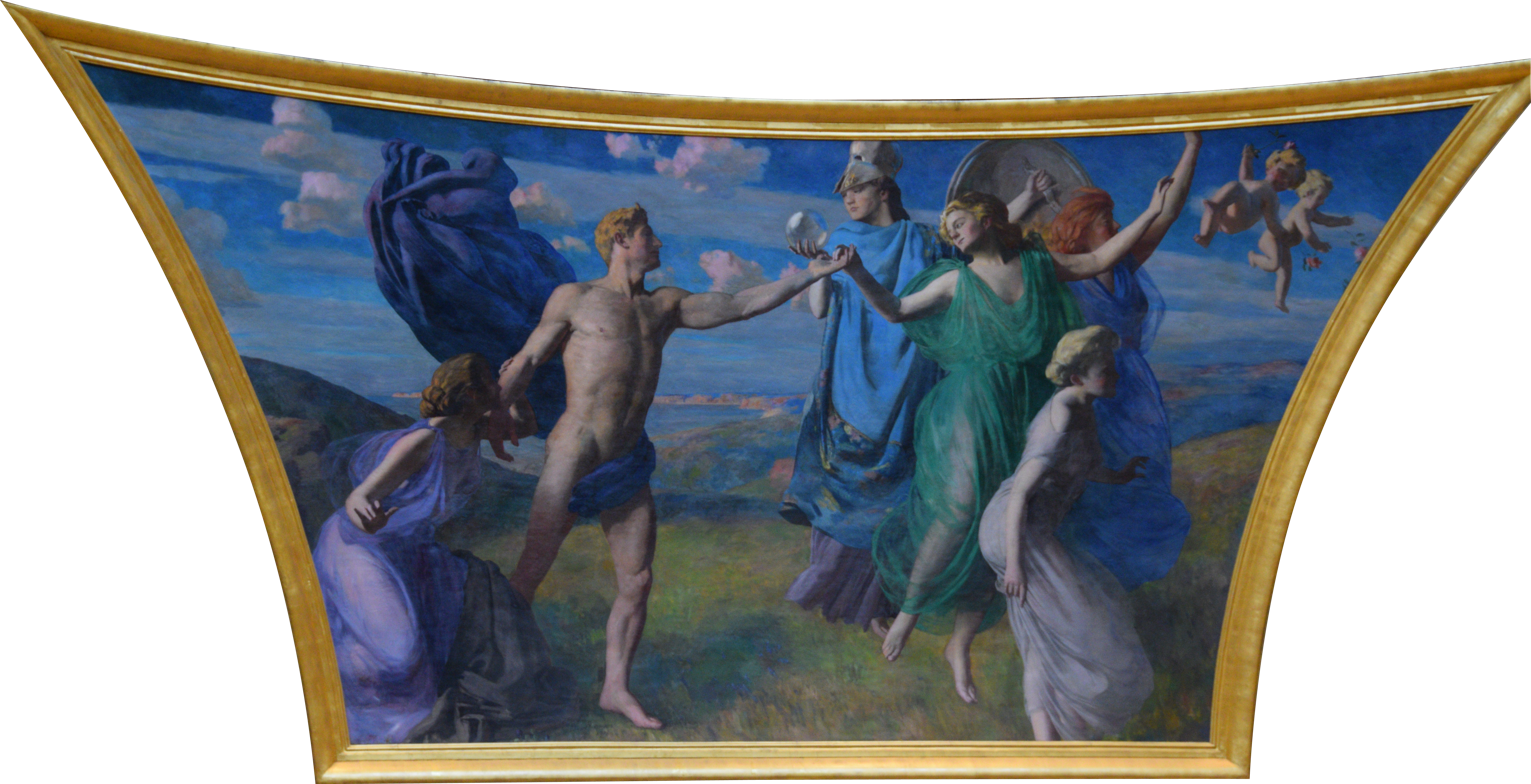
Rotunda (Southeast Corner)

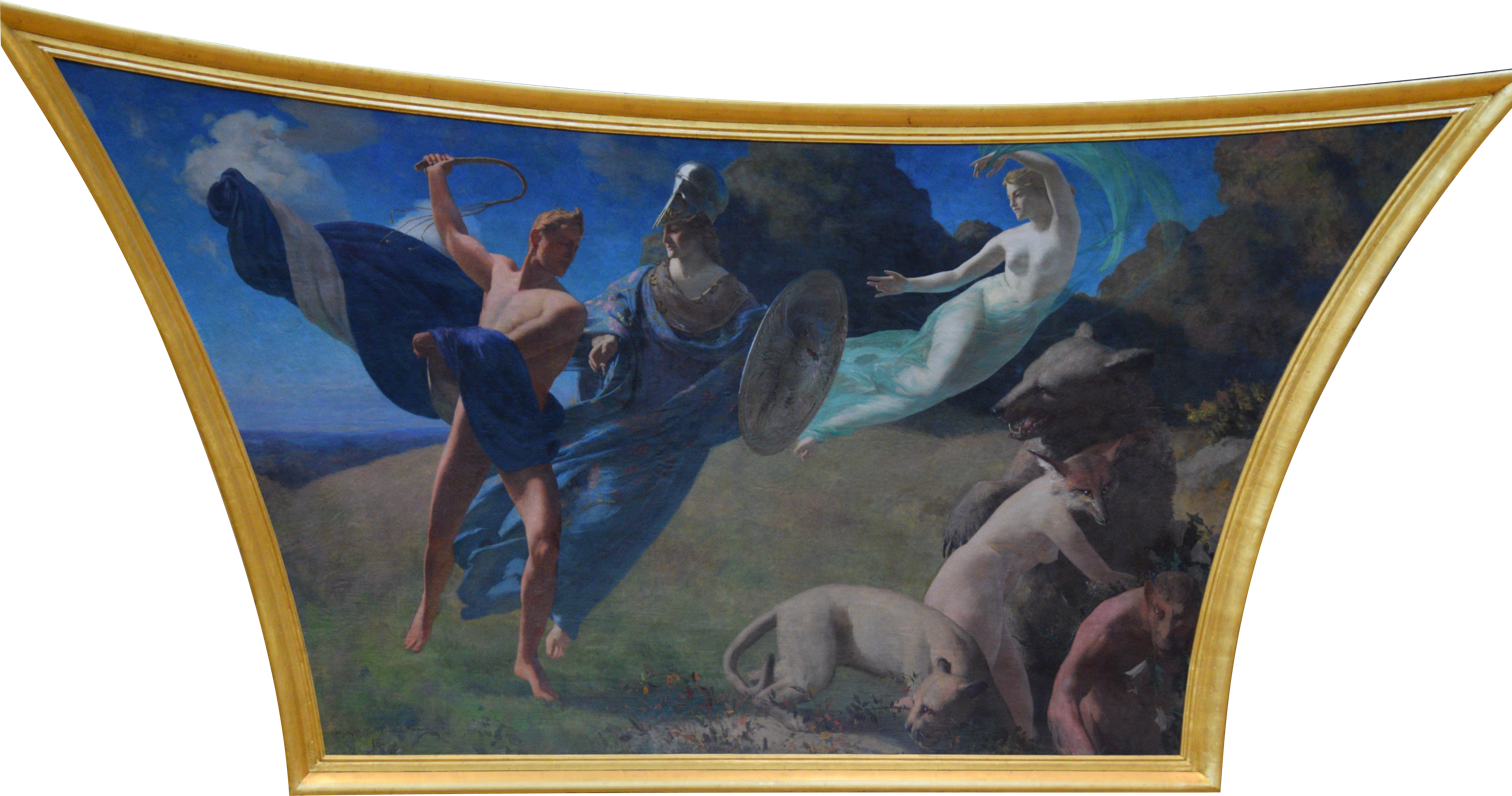
Rotunda (Southwest Corner)

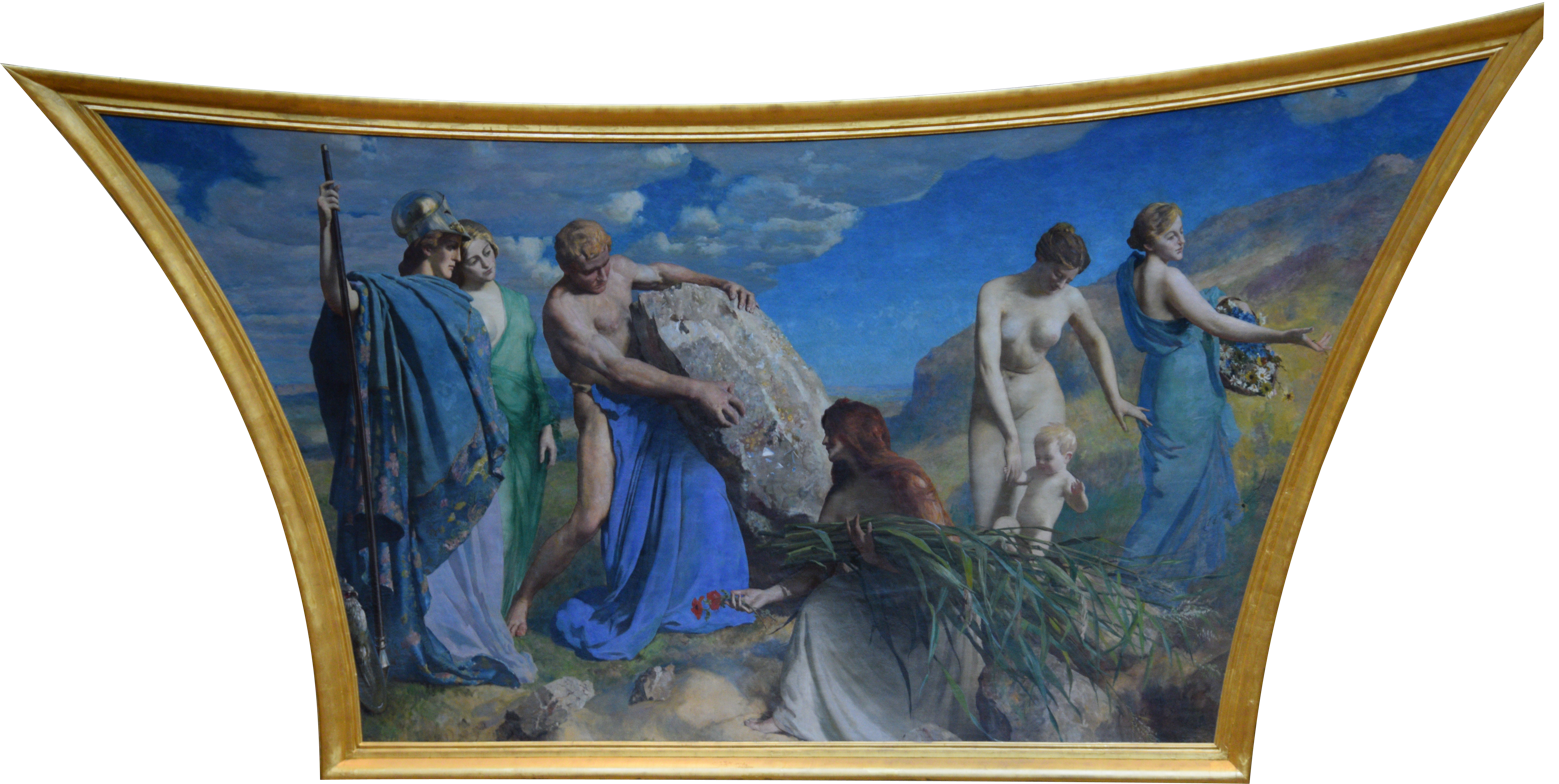
Rotunda (Northwest Corner)

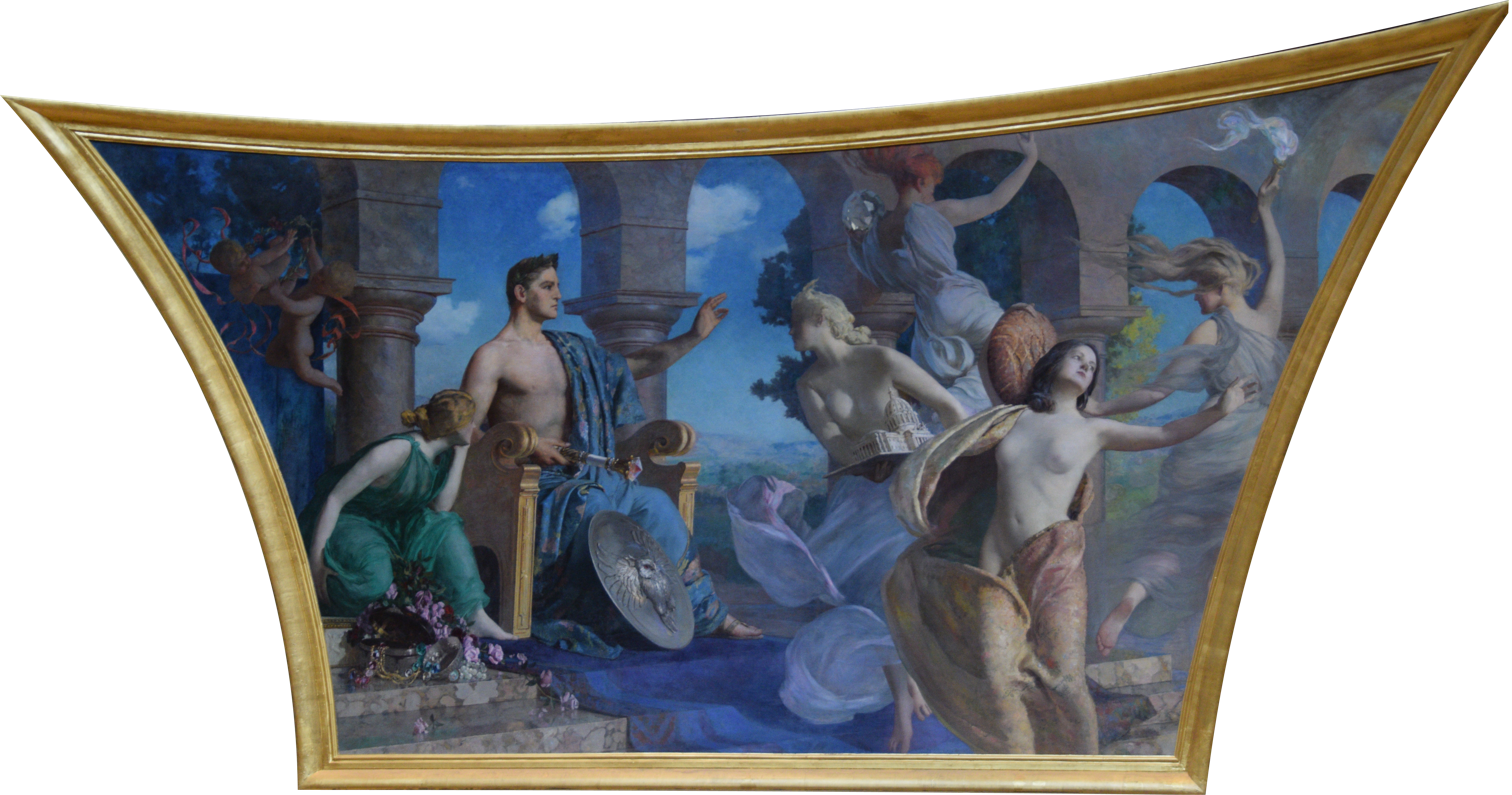
Rotunda (Northeast Corner)

=== Melpomene mural (Library of Congress) ===
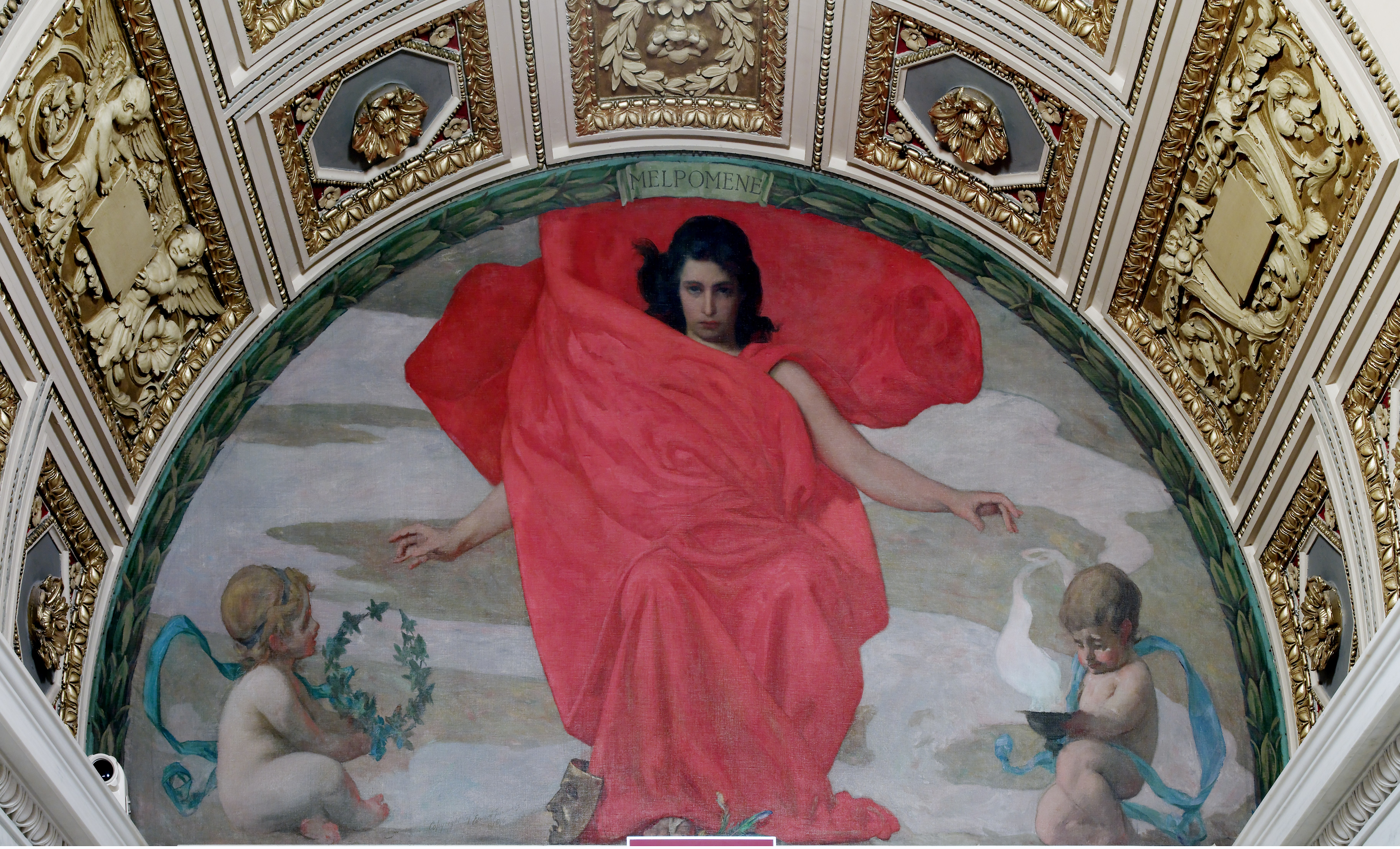
Melpomene mural (full picture, 1896), at the Library of Congress in Washington DC. Photograph (2007) by Carol Highsmith (1946–).

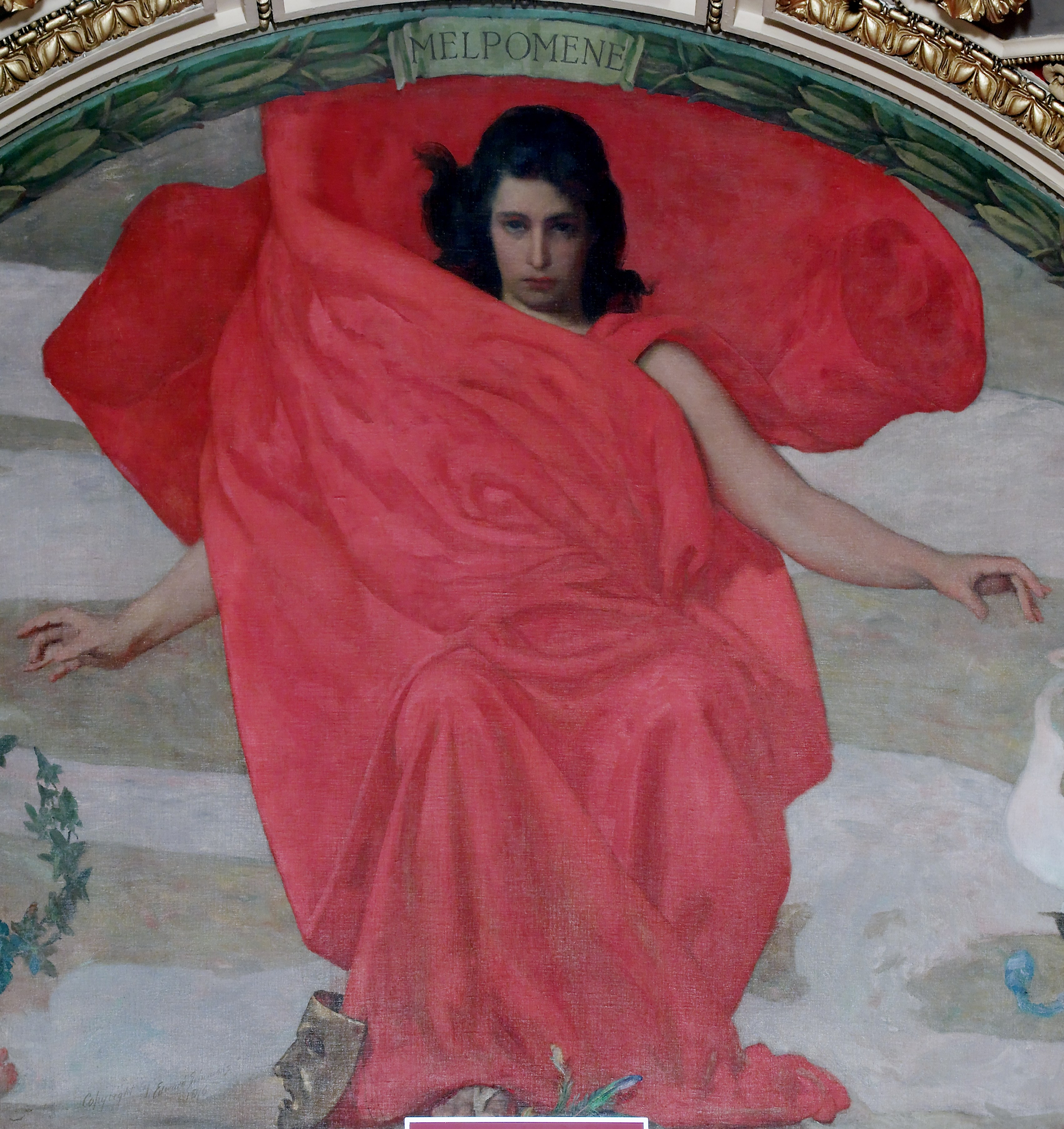
Melpomene mural (detail, 1896), at the Library of Congress in Washington DC. Photograph (2007) by Carol Highsmith (1946–).
