= Latino Money =

The Latinos Money Magazine, formerly known as Latino Money Magazine, is a quarterly US magazine which is noted for publishing its list of Hispanic billionaires and Hispanic millionaires. It was founded in 2002 by Jomo Thomas for Niche Lab Capital Group.
