= Javon Wims =

American football player (born 1994)

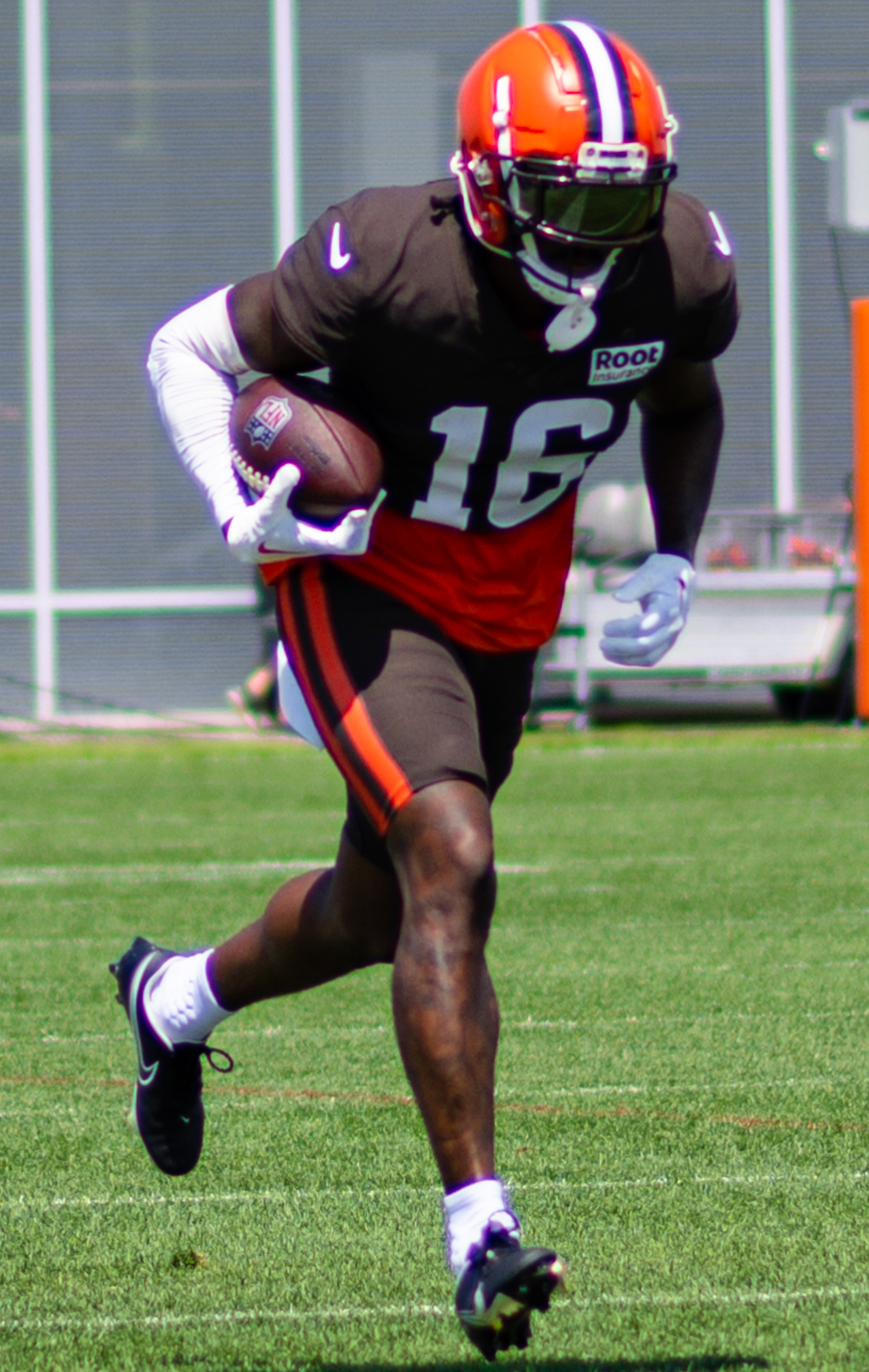
- Wims with the Cleveland Browns in 2022

No. 83, 84
- Position: Wide receiver

Personal information
- Born: September 11, 1994 (age 32); Carol City, Florida, U.S.
- Listed height: 6 ft 3 in (1.91 m)
- Listed weight: 215 lb (98 kg)

Career information
- High school: Edward H. White (Jacksonville, Florida)
- College: Georgia
- NFL draft: 2018: 7th round, 224th overall pick

Career history
- Chicago Bears (2018–2020); Las Vegas Raiders (2021–2022)*; Cleveland Browns (2022)*; Arizona Cardinals (2022); Carolina Panthers (2023)*
- * Offseason or practice squad member only

Career NFL statistics
- Receptions: 28
- Receiving yards: 266
- Receiving touchdowns: 2
- Stats at Pro Football Reference

Javon Lamar Wims (born September 11, 1994) is an American former professional football player who was a wide receiver in the National Football League (NFL). He played college football for the Georgia Bulldogs. He is currently an offensive assistant coach for the Georgia Bulldogs.

== Early life ==
Wims attended and played high school football at Edward H. White High School in Jacksonville, Florida.

== College career ==
=== Hinds Community College ===
On August 27, 2015, Wims recorded 107 yards and two touchdowns on six catches in the season opener against Holmes. The very next week, he followed up his big game with another, recording six catches for 193 yards and two touchdowns, including a 78-yarder and a 65-yarder against Northeast CC. On September 17, he scored twice more and gained 116 yards on eight catches in the team's first loss against Mississippi Gulf Coast. On October 15, Wims scored two more times with 145 yards on ten catches against Jones County JC. He finished his 2015 season with 47 receptions for 779 yards and nine touchdowns, leading his team in all three categories.

On November 9, Wims was named All-Region & All-State 1st team honors and was named Most Outstanding Offensive Player for the South Division. On December 15, Wims was named as an NJCAA All-American. On February 3, Wims signed his National Letter of Intent to extend his football career at the University of Georgia on National Signing Day.

=== University of Georgia ===
On February 3, 2016, Wims joined Georgia on National Signing Day. On September 24, he made his Georgia debut, hauling in one catch for 10 yards. On November 5, Wims recorded career-highs with 5 receptions for 90 yards including a season-high 51-yard reception against Kentucky. On December 30, Wims caught his first touchdown on Georgia, a 4-yard grab in the 31–23 victory over TCU in the 2016 Liberty Bowl. Wims ended his first season with the Bulldogs with 17 receptions for 190 yards and a touchdown.

In the season-opener against Appalachian State, Wims caught three passes for 81 yards and a touchdown. On September 30, 2017, he recorded his second touchdown with 3 catches for 33 yards against Tennessee. On October 14, Wims racked up 95 yards on five receptions against Missouri. After recording his third touchdown against Florida on October 28, the next week Wims brought in his fourth touchdown against South Carolina for a net total of 63 yards on six catches. In the final two games of the regular season, Wims hit his stride, catching 11 passes for 160 yards and two touchdowns against Kentucky and Georgia State.

The Bulldogs went 11–1 in 2017, and made the 2018 Rose Bowl, defeating the Oklahoma Sooners 54–48, with Wims contributing six receptions for 73 yards and a touchdown. Georgia would go on to lose the 2018 College Football Playoff National Championship against Alabama 26–23 with Wims making one catch for 16 yards. Wims ended the 2017 season as the Bulldogs' leading receiver, recording 45 receptions for 720 yards and seven touchdowns.

== Professional career ==
Pre-draft measurables
Height	Weight	Arm length	Hand span	40-yard dash	10-yard split	20-yard split	20-yard shuttle	Three-cone drill	Vertical jump	Broad jump
6 ft 2 7/8 in (1.90 m)	215 lb (98 kg)	31 1/2 in (0.80 m)	9 1/4 in (0.23 m)	4.53 s	1.56 s	2.64 s	4.53 s	7.00 s	33.5 in (0.85 m)	9 ft 6 in (2.90 m)
All values from NFL Combine/Pro Day

=== Chicago Bears ===
Wims was selected by the Chicago Bears in the seventh round (224 overall) of the 2018 NFL draft. He made his NFL debut in Week 4 of the 2018 season against the Tampa Bay Buccaneers. He recorded his first four professional receptions for 32 yards in the regular season finale against the Minnesota Vikings.

Wims played in all 16 games in 2019 primarily as reserve, and he started 6 games due to Taylor Gabriel being put on concussion protocol numerous times. He reached career-highs in yards (Week 4 against the Vikings), receptions (Week 13 against the Detroit Lions), and caught his first touchdown pass against the New Orleans Saints in Week 7. He ended his season with 18 receptions for 186 yards and a touchdown.

On November 1, 2020, Wims was ejected after punching New Orleans Saints' cornerback C. J. Gardner-Johnson which led to a scuffle in the third quarter of the 26–23 overtime loss after Gardner-Johnson ripped off his mouthpiece. Wims stated that Gardner-Johnson also spat on him prior to the scuffle but Gardner-Johnson denied the report. The next day, the NFL suspended Wims without pay for two games. He was reinstated from suspension on November 17, 2020.

On August 26, 2021, Wims was waived by the Bears.

=== Las Vegas Raiders ===
On September 29, 2021, Wims was signed to the practice squad of the Las Vegas Raiders. He was released on January 11, 2022, then signed a reserve/future contract with the team on January 19. He was released on March 25, 2022.

=== Cleveland Browns ===
On April 20, 2022, Wims signed with the Cleveland Browns. The Browns terminated Wims' contract on August 29, 2022.

=== Arizona Cardinals ===
On September 15, 2022, Wims signed with the Arizona Cardinals to their practice squad. He signed a reserve/future contract on January 9, 2023. Wims was released on June 15.

=== Carolina Panthers ===
On July 26, 2023, Wims signed with the Carolina Panthers. He was released on August 29, as a part of the team’s final roster cuts.
