= Kaleb Johnson (offensive lineman) =

American gridiron football player (born 1993)

No. 72
- Position: Guard

Personal information
- Born: February 22, 1993 (age 33); Jacksonville, Florida
- Listed height: 6 ft 4 in (1.93 m)
- Listed weight: 300 lb (136 kg)

Career information
- High school: Edward H. White (Jacksonville, Florida)
- College: Rutgers
- NFL draft: 2015: undrafted

Career history
- Baltimore Ravens (2015); Cleveland Browns (2015); Arizona Cardinals (2016–2017)*; Kansas City Chiefs (2017–2018)*; Chicago Bears (2018)*; Minnesota Vikings (2018)*; Philadelphia Eagles (2018–2019)*; Baltimore Brigade (2019); Ottawa Redblacks (2019)*
- * Offseason or practice squad member only

Awards and highlights
- Second-team All-Big East (2012); Freshman All-American (2011)
- Stats at Pro Football Reference

Kaleb Johnson (born February 22, 1993) is an American former football guard. He played college football at Rutgers.

== College career ==
Johnson started 50 career games at Rutgers, starting all 13 games at left guard as a senior. He was named honorable mention All-Big Ten at guard by the media and the league's head coaches.

== Professional career ==
Pre-draft measurables
Height	Weight	Arm length	Hand span	Wingspan	40-yard dash	10-yard split	20-yard split	20-yard shuttle	Three-cone drill	Vertical jump	Broad jump	Bench press
6 ft 4 in (1.93 m)	303 lb (137 kg)	33 1/2 in (0.85 m)	10 1/2 in (0.27 m)	6 ft 9 1/2 in (2.07 m)	5.19 s	1.78 s	2.97 s	4.93 s	8.00 s	23.0 in (0.58 m)	8 ft 10 in (2.69 m)	34 reps
All values from Pro Day

=== Baltimore Ravens ===
Johnson signed with the Baltimore Ravens as an undrafted free agent on May 7, 2015. He was waived on September 5, 2015, and was signed to the practice squad the next day. He was promoted to the active roster on November 30, 2015, but was waived on December 12, 2015.

=== Cleveland Browns ===
Johnson was claimed off waivers by the Cleveland Browns on December 14, 2015. He was waived on September 3, 2016, and was signed to the practice squad the next day, but was released the following day.

=== Arizona Cardinals ===
Johnson was signed to the Arizona Cardinals' practice squad on September 29, 2016. He signed a reserve/future contract with the Cardinals on January 3, 2017.

On September 2, 2017, Johnson was waived by the Cardinals.

=== Kansas City Chiefs ===
On December 13, 2017, Johnson was signed to the Kansas City Chiefs' practice squad. He signed a reserve/future contract with the Chiefs on January 10, 2018. He was waived on June 14, 2018.

=== Chicago Bears ===
On August 4, 2018, Johnson signed with the Chicago Bears. He was waived on August 11, 2018.

=== Minnesota Vikings ===
On August 13, 2018, Johnson signed with the Minnesota Vikings. He was waived on August 31, 2018.

=== Philadelphia Eagles ===
On December 14, 2018, Johnson was signed to the Philadelphia Eagles practice squad. He signed a reserve/future contract with the Eagles on January 14, 2019. On May 1, 2019, Johnson was waived by the Eagles.

=== Baltimore Brigade ===
On May 7, 2019, Johnson was assigned to Baltimore Brigade.

=== Ottawa Redblacks ===
Johnson signed with the Ottawa Redblacks on May 19, 2019, and was moved to their retired list three days later.
