= Palmer High School (Alaska) =

Coordinates: 61.6054°N 149.1377°W

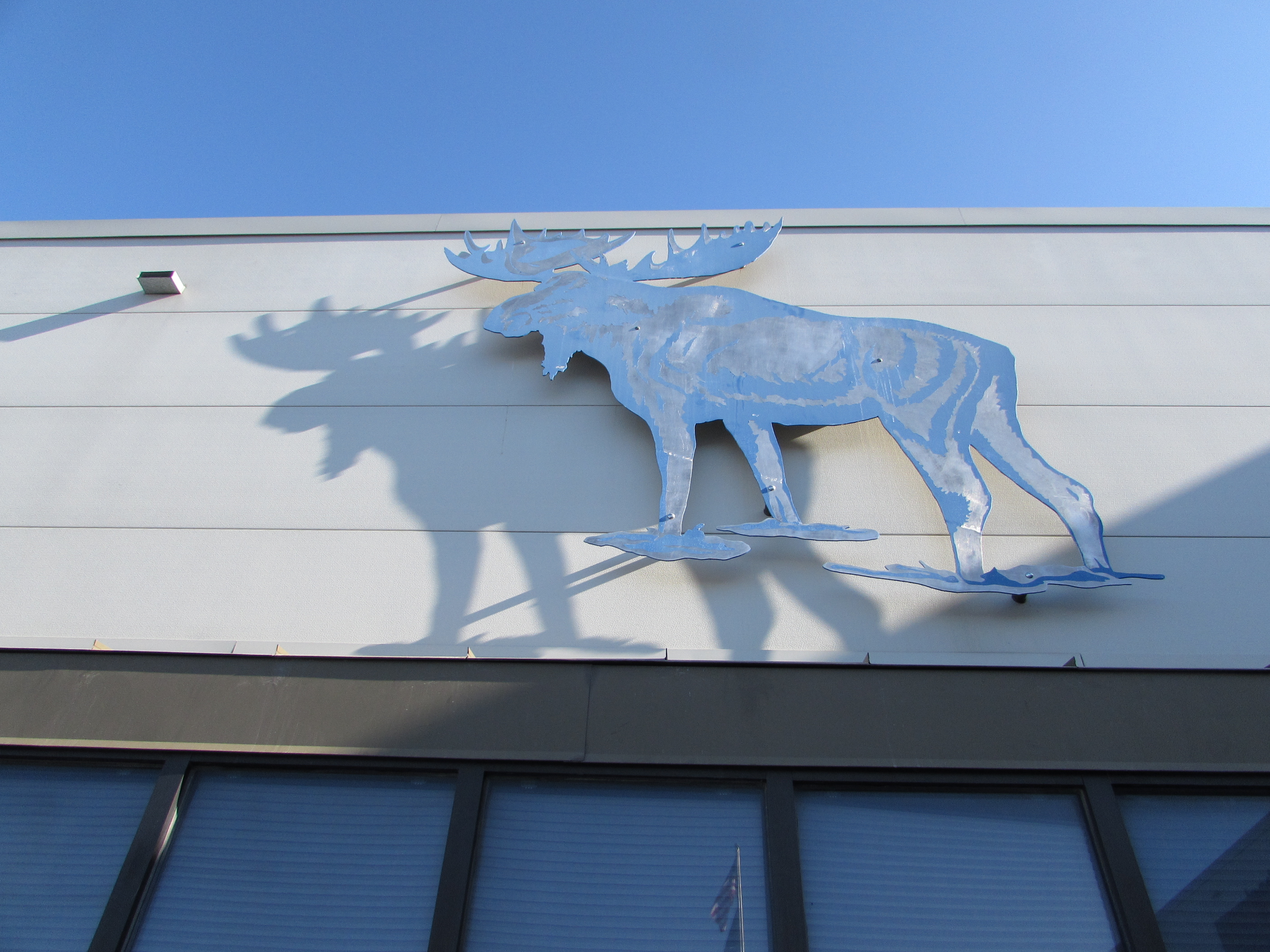
- The school mascot, a blue moose, outside the entrance to Palmer High School

Location
- 1170 W. Arctic Ave; Palmer, Alaska 99654; United States

Information
- School type: Public secondary school
- Motto: Fearless
- School district: Matanuska-Susitna Borough School District
- CEEB code: 020105
- Principal: Matthew Clark
- Teaching staff: 42.75
- Grades: 9–12
- Enrollment: 649 (2023-2024)
- Student to teacher ratio: 15.18
- Campus type: Suburban
- Colors: Blue and white
- Mascot: Moose
- Website: www.matsuk12.us/phs

Palmer High School is a high school located in the Matanuska-Susitna Borough in the city of Palmer, Alaska. The school offers a curriculum comprising arts, mathematics, world languages, physical education and health, science, English, social sciences, and career and technical education. Student support services are available for students.

== Sports ==
Palmer High School's sports include flag football, baseball, tennis, wrestling, swimming, diving, cross country running, cross country skiing, track and field, football, ice hockey, volleyball, e-sports, and soccer.

Machetanz Field is located on campus.

== History ==
The school was established in 1936.

== Curriculum ==
The foreign languages offered are French and Japanese. IB classes (see below) are offered in Humanities/Literature, Math, Biology, Chemistry, History, Music, Art, Agriculture, and Foreign Languages. In 2012 the school began offering the APEX online education program.

== International Baccalaureate ==
Palmer High School has been an International Baccalaureate World School since 1999. It is one of two International Baccalaureate schools in Alaska.

== Notable alumni ==
- Talis Colberg (1976), former Alaska State Attorney General
- Junior Aumavae (2003), former American football nose tackle.
- Kerry Weiland (1999), American retired ice hockey and inline hockey player.
