= Edward H. White High School =

Coordinates: 30.289354°N 81.767892°W

Location
- 1700 Old Middleburg Rd; Jacksonville, Florida 32210; United States

Information
- Type: Public High School
- Motto: "Launching Leadership in a Community Partnership School."
- Established: 1971
- Principal: Traci Battest
- Teaching staff: 80.00 (FTE)
- Enrollment: 1,666 (2023–2024)
- Student to teacher ratio: 20.82
- Campus: Urban
- Colors: Green & gold
- Mascot: Commanders
- Website: https://dcps.duvalschools.org/o/ewhs

Edward H. White High School is a public high school operated by the Duval County Public Schools. It is located on the Westside of Jacksonville, Florida. It is almost exclusively referred to as "Ed White High School," not "White High School".

== Edward H. White ==
Edward H. White High School was named in honor of Ed White, U.S. Air Force Lieutenant Colonel, NASA Astronaut, and first American to conduct a spacewalk. He was killed during a pre-launch test aboard Apollo 1 on January 27, 1967, along with fellow astronauts "Gus" Grissom and Roger Chaffee.

== Early years ==
Upon opening in 1971, Ed White took overflow students from Forrest High School and Paxon High School, also on the Westside. Like all high schools in Duval county, it served students in the 10th, 11th, and 12th grades. In 1991 the Duval County School Board implemented a change in grade distribution that affected nearly all schools in the county. 9th graders, who had previously attended "junior high schools", were switched to traditional high schools, matching the four-year pattern found in the vast majority of high schools in the United States. Since August 1991, Ed White has been one of these four year high schools, serving 9th through 12th grades.

When first built, there was no bell rung between classes; instead, music was played for 5 minutes between classes. All students had to be in their next class when the music ended. The music itself came from an 8-Track player that was hooked into the school intercom system in the front office. The school had classrooms that were opened out to each other consisting of four mods containing 8 classrooms called pods. There was a divider but the pods were opened out to each other. The scheduling was modular as well - 20 minutes segments called "mods" 16 a day allowing for a different schedule each day, so that a student didn't have each subject the same time each day. The modular scheduling system ended in 1985. The cafeteria was called the "Satellite Café" and was next to a courtyard. Students could use the cafeteria as an area to hang out with their friends or study even when lunch wasn't being served. The library called the Media Center ( a new concept in those heady days of the early 70s) was opened and you could walk through it on your way to class. The "Senior Class" held weekly surveys to decide what music would be played. Some of the bathrooms were fully carpeted. The gymnasium had a state-of-the-art "rubber" floor for basketball, and the cafeteria served milkshakes. All of these features were later changed or removed.

The school was one of the first high schools in Duval County to have a Naval Junior Reserve Officer Training Corps, or NJROTC unit. That NJROTC unit still exists.

== Advanced curriculum ==
Ed White currently offers 13 Advanced Placement courses as opportunities for students to receive college credit.

- Psychology
- Microeconomics
- Macroeconomics
- Biology
- Physics B
- Calculus AB
- Statistics
- English Language
- English Literature
- Human Geography
- United States Government & Politics
- European History
- United States History

Edward H. White High School was also authorized on March 1, 2012, as an International Baccalaureate World School, offering the IB Diploma Programme, after having pursued authorization since 2008.

== Model United Nations Program ==
Ed White High School is one of very few Model UN programs in the Northeast Florida region, and has been successful at conferences throughout the state including KnightMUN, GatorMUN, BullMUN, the Volusia County Model UN, and most importantly, FHSMUN (the Florida High Schools Model United Nations).

Performance History at Florida High Schools Model United Nations

Year	Award	Country
2005 (XXVI)	Distinguished Delegation	France
2006 (XXVII)	Distinguished Delegation	The Philippines
2007 (XXVIII)	Honorable Mention Delegation	Japan
2008 (XXIX)	Distinguished Delegation	The United Kingdom (also had delegates as the Islamic Republic of Iran and the Democratic People's Republic of Korea) Led by Kyle Cogburn as Secretary General
2009 (30)	Distinguished Delegation	The United Kingdom (also had delegates as the Islamic Republic of Iran)
2010 (31)	Distinguished Delegation	The People's Republic of China
2010 (31)	Honorable Mention Delegation	The Kingdom of Spain

In May 2009, the team also participated at the 10th Annual UNA-USA Model United Nations Conference held in New York City. As Peru, the team won Honorable Mention in General Assembly Sixth Committee and UN Climate Change Conference: Latin America.

== Athletics and swimming pool ==
Ed White High fields many athletic programs which are boys football, girls volleyball, tennis, basketball, soccer, golf, track and field, boys baseball, girls softball and girls flag football.

The school has an outdoor pool which is used by the athletic teams and physical education classes during the academic year; then it becomes a free public pool operated by the City of Jacksonville Parks & Recreation Department during the summer months.

== Notable alumni ==
- Elijah Burke - professional wrestler; 1998
- Nichole Van Croft; Playboy Playmate of the Month, October 2000
- Jamaal Fudge - S; Jacksonville Jaguars 2006-2008: Atlanta Falcons 2008-2009
- Dee Webb- CB; Jacksonville Jaguars; 2006-2007
- Dexter Jackson - 2008 Mr. Olympia (Professional Bodybuilder)
- Javon Wims- WR Chicago Bears; 2018
- Javaris Davis - CB for the Arlington Renegades of the XFL
- Kaleb Johnson - Guard for Baltimore Ravens; 2015
- Rashod Hill - OT for Minnesota Vikings; 2016-2021
