= Tennyson High School =

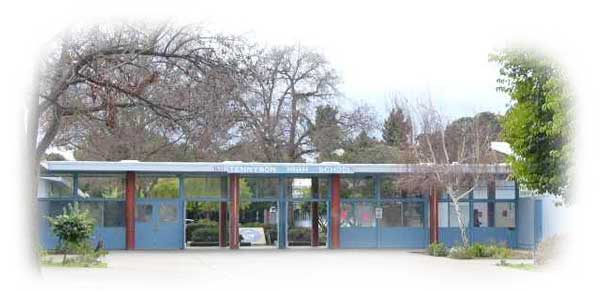

Location
- 27035 Whitman Street; Hayward, California 94544; United States; 37°38′31″N 122°3′59″W

Information
- Type: Public high school
- Established: 1957
- School district: Hayward Unified School District
- Principal: Veronica Estrada
- Teaching staff: 88.13 (on an FTE basis)
- Grades: 9-12
- Enrollment: 1,558 (2023–2024)
- Student to teacher ratio: 17.68
- Colors: Columbia blue and black
- Nickname: Lancers
- Website: School website

Tennyson High School is a public high school in Hayward, California, United States, formed in 1957.

== Associated schools ==
Local schools which transition into Tennyson High include Cesar E. Chavez Middle School, Dr. Martin Luther King Jr. Middle School, Winton Middle School, and sometimes Ochoa Middle School.

== Notable alumni ==
- Jim Godman, Hall of Fame professional bowler
- Doug Henry, MLB baseball player
- Ernesto Lacayo, professional football kicker
- Stacy A. Littlejohn, television writer

== See also ==
- Alameda County high schools
