= Zack Williams (American football) =

American football player (born 1988)

No. 64
- Position: Center

Personal information
- Born: December 27, 1988 (age 37); Pasadena, California, U.S.
- Listed height: 6 ft 3 in (1.91 m)
- Listed weight: 315 lb (143 kg)

Career information
- High school: Pasadena
- College: Washington State
- NFL draft: 2011: 6th round, 203rd overall pick

Career history
- Carolina Panthers (2011–2012); Orlando Predators (2014); Las Vegas Outlaws (2015); Arizona Rattlers (2016)*; Los Angeles KISS (2016)*
- * Offseason or practice squad member only

Career NFL statistics
- Games played: 1
- Stats at Pro Football Reference

Career AFL statistics
- Total tackles: 3.5
- Pass deflections: 1
- Stats at ArenaFan.com

Zachary Williams (born December 27, 1988) is an American former professional football player who was a center in the National Football League (NFL). He was selected by the Carolina Panthers in the sixth round of the 2011 NFL draft. He played college football for the Washington State Cougars.

Pre-draft measurables
Height	Weight	Arm length	Hand span	Wingspan	40-yard dash	10-yard split	20-yard split	20-yard shuttle	Three-cone drill	Vertical jump	Broad jump	Bench press
6 ft 3 in (1.91 m)	309 lb (140 kg)	33 1/4 in (0.84 m)	9 1/2 in (0.24 m)	6 ft 5 7/8 in (1.98 m)	5.27 s	1.84 s	3.06 s	4.62 s	7.54 s	30.0 in (0.76 m)	8 ft 7 in (2.62 m)	30 reps
All values from NFL Combine/Pro Day

On February 18, 2014, Williams was assigned to the Orlando Predators of the Arena Football League.

On January 30, 2015, Williams was traded to the Las Vegas Outlaws for Claim Order Position.

On November 9, 2015, Williams was assigned to the Arizona Rattlers. He was placed on reassignment on February 22, 2016.

On March 21, 2016, Williams was assigned to the Los Angeles KISS. On March 30, 2016, Williams was placed on recallable reassignment.
