= Will Simmons =

American painter (1884–1949)

William Francis Simmons
- Born: June 4, 1884; Elche, Spain
- Died: January 1, 1949 (aged 64); Baltimore, Maryland, United States
- Occupation: Painter

Will Simmons (June 4, 1884 – January 1, 1949) was an American painter. His work was part of the painting event in the art competition at the 1936 Summer Olympics. His father was the painter and muralist Edward Emerson Simmons, one of the famous group called Ten American Painters.
