= Ernesto Lacayo =

American football player (born 1989)

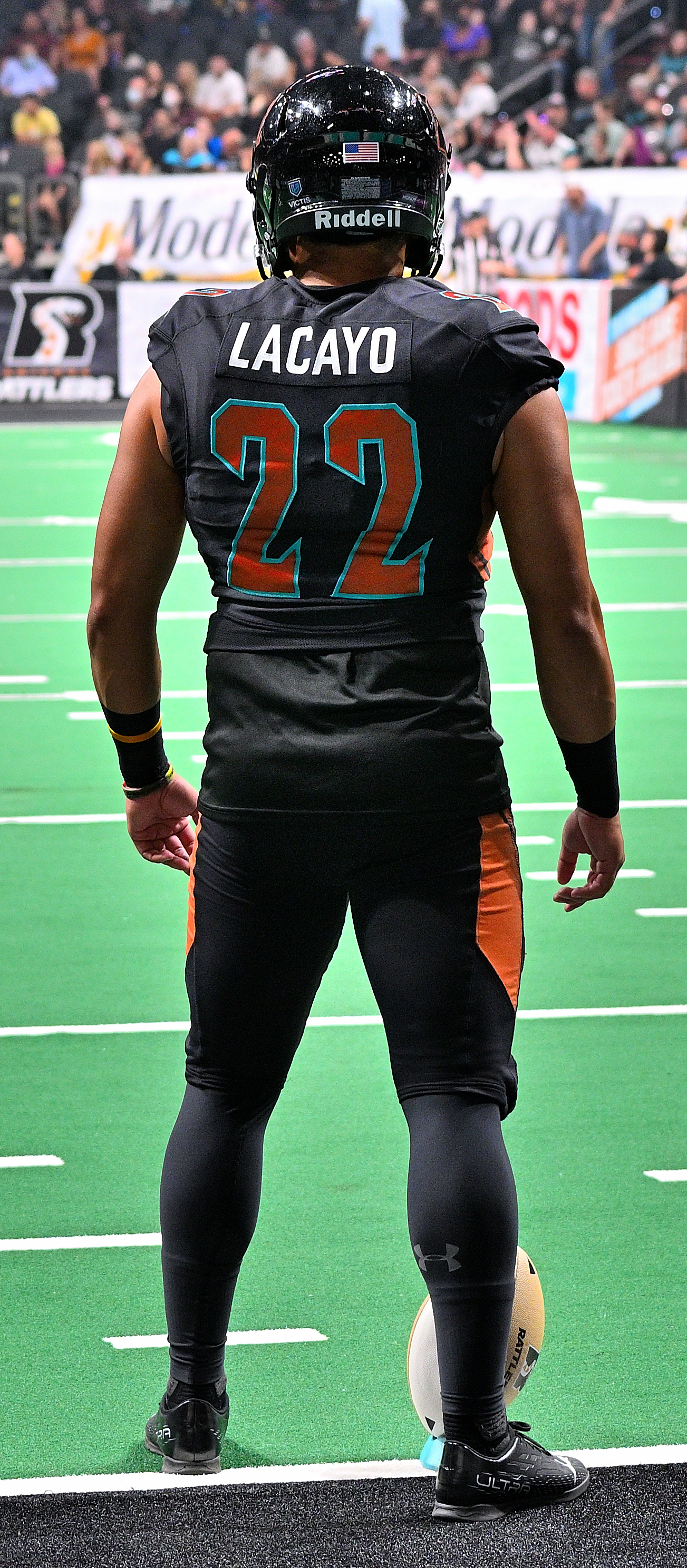
- Lacayo with the Arizona Rattlers in 2021

No. 22 – San Diego Strike Force
- Position: Placekicker
- Roster status: Active

Personal information
- Born: May 5, 1989 (age 37); Hayward, California, U.S.
- Listed height: 5 ft 8 in (1.73 m)
- Listed weight: 195 lb (88 kg)

Career information
- High school: Tennyson (Hayward, California)
- College: Hastings
- NFL draft: 2011: undrafted

Career history
- Nebraska Danger (2011); Louisiana Swashbucklers (2013); Wichita Wild (2014); Wichita Force (2015); Las Vegas Outlaws (2015); Portland Steel (2016); San Diego Strike Force (2019); Seattle Dragons (2020); Arizona Rattlers (2021–2022); Duke City Gladiators (2023–2024); San Diego Strike Force (2025–present)

Awards and highlights
- First-team All-CPIFL (2014); Second-team All-IFL (2019); Second-team All-IFL (2021)
- Stats at ArenaFan.com

Ernesto Lacayo (born May 5, 1989) is an American football placekicker for the San Diego Strike Force of the Indoor Football League (IFL).

== Early life ==
Lacayo played high school football at Tennyson High School in Hayward, California, where he holds numerous kicking records. He played college football at Hastings College (NAIA), where he holds all kicking records in Hastings College history.

== Professional career ==
Lacayo went undrafted in the 2011 NFL draft and signed with the Nebraska Danger (IFL) after the draft. After one year with the Danger, he signed with the Louisiana Swashbucklers (PIFL) 2013. After the Swashbucklers folded in 2013, he signed with the Wichita Wild (CPIFL) in 2014. Lacayo set an All-Arena/Indoor record of 30 field goals made in a season, and kicked a CPIFL record 55-yard field goal against the Salina Bombers. He also kicked a 51-yard game-winning field goal against the Dodge City Law to put the Wild in the CPIFL Championship.

In 2014, Lacayo signed with the Wichita Force (CIF) for the 2015 season, where he played only 10 games before being called up to play for the Las Vegas Outlaws (arena football) (AFL) in 2015. In 11 games with the Outlaws, Lacayo led the league point after touchdown (PAT) percentage connecting on 54-of-59 (91.5%). In 2016, he signed with the Portland Steel (AFL).

Lacayo signed with the Seattle Dragons of the XFL in February 2020. He had his contract terminated when the league suspended operations on April 10, 2020.

In spring 2021, Lacayo signed with the Arizona Rattlers for their 2021 season. He was named to the 2021 All-IFL Second Team after he finished the regular season completing 85 of 93 PAT attempts and 6 of 10 field goals for the Rattlers.

On December 3, 2022, Lacayo signed with the Duke City Gladiators of the Indoor Football League (IFL).

== Personal life ==
Ernesto married Lindsay Kray Lacayo on October 11, 2024.
