= Jeff Richards (defensive back) =

American football player (born 1991)

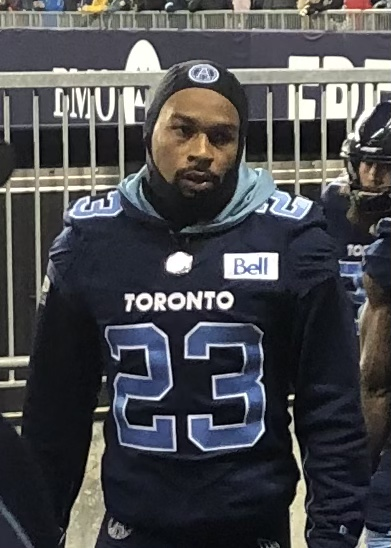
- Richards with the Toronto Argonauts in 2021

No. 22, 29, 23, 24
- Position: Defensive back

Personal information
- Born: January 3, 1991 (age 35); Del City, Oklahoma, U.S.
- Listed height: 6 ft 2 in (1.88 m)
- Listed weight: 200 lb (91 kg)

Career information
- High school: Del City
- College: Emporia State
- NFL draft: 2013: undrafted

Career history
- Spokane Shock (2015); Ottawa Redblacks (2015–2016); Carolina Panthers (2017)*; Los Angeles Chargers (2017–2018); Toronto Argonauts (2019–2021); Edmonton Elks (2022)
- * Offseason or practice squad member only

Awards and highlights
- Grey Cup champion (2016)

Career NFL statistics
- Total tackles: 5
- Stats at Pro Football Reference
- Stats at CFL.ca

Jeff Richards (born January 3, 1991) is an American former professional football player who was a defensive back in the National Football League (NFL) and Canadian Football League (CFL). He played college football at Northeastern Oklahoma A&M from 2009 to 2010 before transferring to Emporia State. He was a member of the Ottawa Redblacks team that won the 104th Grey Cup in 2016.

== Professional career ==
On December 17, 2013, Richards attended a tryout with the New York Jets, but was not signed.

=== Spokane Shock ===
In 2015, Richards played five games for the Spokane Shock of the Arena Football League and recorded 25 combined tackles, eight pass deflections, and a forced fumble.

=== Ottawa Redblacks ===
Richards played for the Ottawa Redblacks of the CFL from 2015 to 2016. In his first season, he recorded four combined tackles in three games. He finished the 2016 season with 18 combined tackles in ten games. Richards helped the Redblacks win the 104th Grey Cup after defeating the Calgary Stampeders 39–33.

=== Carolina Panthers ===
On January 4, 2017, the Carolina Panthers signed Richards to a reserve/future contract. On September 2, 2017, Richards was waived by the Panthers as part of their final roster cuts.

=== Los Angeles Chargers (first stint) ===
On September 3, 2017, Richards was claimed off waivers by the Los Angeles Chargers. He was waived by the Chargers on September 11, 2017, and was re-signed to the practice squad two days later. He signed a reserve/future contract with the Chargers on January 2, 2018.

On September 1, 2018, Richards was waived by the Chargers.

=== Tampa Bay Buccaneers ===
On September 11, 2018, Richards was signed to the Tampa Bay Buccaneers' practice squad. He was released on September 25, 2018.

=== Los Angeles Chargers (second stint) ===
On October 10, 2018, Richards was signed to the Chargers practice squad. He was promoted to the active roster on November 3, 2018. He was waived on August 31, 2019.

=== Toronto Argonauts ===
Richards signed with the Toronto Argonauts on January 13, 2020. The Canadian Football League cancelled the 2020 season and Richards was released on August 17, 2020. He was re-signed by the Argonauts for the 2021 CFL season on January 18, 2021. He played and started in 13 regular season games where he had 42 defensive tackles and one interception. He was released on April 29, 2022.

=== Edmonton Elks ===
Richards signed with the Edmonton Elks on September 3, 2022. He was later released on December 1, 2022.
