= Jomo Thomas =

American businessman, attorney, and author (1974–2025)

Jomo Gamal Thomas was an American businessman, attorney, and author based in New York City. He died on November 27, 2025, in Cebu, Philippines.

== Early life ==
Thomas was born in the Bronx, New York on January 31, 1974. He grew up in Roosevelt and Uniondale. During his teenage years, he was active as a motivational speaker, community organizer, and activist with the Economic Opportunity Commission of Nassau County and its satellite community organization, Operation Outreach.

Thomas received an American Economic Association fellowship to study in their summer training and minority scholarship program at Stanford University. He graduated with honors in economics from Brandeis University in 1996 and received his J.D. degree from the George Washington University Law School in 2000.

== Business ==
Thomas was a co-founder of CBD Ventures, a venture capital company.

He also founded Niche Lab Capital Group, a private venture capital group that funded the personal finance publications of Latinos Money Magazine and Black Wealth and Fortune Magazine.

Latinos Money Magazine is noted for annually publishing the Latino Money Magazine 100 richest Hispanic Americans. Black Wealth and Fortune Magazine is noted for publishing the Black Wealth and Fortune 100 Richest Black People in America.

Thomas, along with Monifa Thomas, published The Black Millionaire Next Door: Black Wealth in 2003. That year, he was featured on the Tavis Smiley Show on NPR, discussing the Black Wealth and Fortunes Magazine special report "The Black Millionaire Next Door: Black Wealth 2003".

Thomas was the founder and chairman of J.G. Thomas & Associates, a New York law firm that concentrates on business law, asset protection, estate planning, entertainment law, intellectual property law, and immigration law.

== Media, popular culture, and lectures ==
Thomas was at the forefront of uncovering multimillion-dollar real estate mortgage scams in New York City. He was featured in the Brooklyn Brief article "Real Estate Fraud Ring Gleaning Illicit Rents from Scores of Properties", by Matthew Taub, and in The New York Times piece "Real Estate Shell Companies Scheme to Defraud Homeowners Out of Their Homes", an article by Stepanie Saul. In 2015, Brooklyn Borough president, Eric Adams, gave special thanks to Thomas for bringing the issue to his attention.

Thomas was a passionate advocate for military families seeking to recover life insurance survivor benefits via the Servicemembers' Group Life Insurance plan for families of military veterans, working with attorney Cristobal Bonifaz.

Thomas was a motivational radio speaker who regularly appeared on the stations WLIB and on WVIP. He was the founder of the organization Don't Procrastinate, whose mission is to increase productivity and provide educational information.

== Death ==
Thomas died on November 27, 2025, in Cebu, Philippines.
