= Junior Aumavae =

American Samoan gridiron football player (born 1986)

No. 99
- Position: Nose tackle

Personal information
- Born: April 29, 1986 (age 40); American Samoa
- Listed height: 6 ft 3 in (1.91 m)
- Listed weight: 310 lb (141 kg)

Career information
- High school: Palmer (Palmer, Alaska, U.S.)
- College: Minnesota State
- NFL draft: 2010: undrafted

Career history
- Dallas Cowboys (2010)*; Fairbanks Grizzlies (2011); Green Bay Blizzard (2012); Tampa Bay Storm (2013)*; New York Jets (2013)*; Tampa Bay Storm (2014); Green Bay Blizzard (2014); Boston Brawlers (2014); Las Vegas Outlaws (2015)*
- * Offseason or practice squad member only
- Stats at ArenaFan.com

Junior Aumavae (born April 29, 1986) is an American former professional football nose tackle. He was signed by the Dallas Cowboys as an undrafted free agent in 2010. He played college football at Western Washington until he transferred to Minnesota State for his senior season.

== Early life ==
He attended Palmer High School in Palmer, Alaska. In 2003, he was a recipient of the Alaska State lineman of the year award in senior year and runner up his junior year at Palmer High School.

== College career ==
=== Western Washington ===
In his freshman season, he was selected to the First-team Great Northwestern Athletic Conference team. In his sophomore season, he was an All-North Central Conference Honorable Mention. He was a Two-time Western Washington University Defensive Player of the Week in his junior season.

=== Minnesota State ===
He transferred to Minnesota State from Western Washington prior to his senior season after learning the news that Western Washington opted to cancel its football program. He was selected to the First-team All-Northern Sun Intercollegiate Conference South and was named All- Region Team Northern Sun Intercollegiate Conference Newcomer of the Year in his senior season.

== Professional career ==
=== Dallas Cowboys ===
On April 25, 2010 he signed with the Dallas Cowboys as undrafted free agent. On July 20, 2010, he was released during Training camp.

=== Fairbanks Grizzlies ===
On June 1, 2011, he signed with the Fairbanks Grizzlies of the Indoor Football League.

=== Green Bay Blizzard ===
On November 8, 2011, he signed with the Green Bay Blizzard of the Indoor Football League for the 2012 IFL season.

=== Tampa Bay Storm ===
On February 5, 2013, he signed with the Tampa Bay Storm of the Arena Football League.

=== New York Jets ===
On March 1, 2013, he signed with the New York Jets. He was released on August 31, 2013. He was signed to the team's practice squad on September 3, 2013. He was released on October 9, 2013.

=== Tampa Bay Storm ===
Upon his release from the Jets, Aumavae returned to the Storms active roster.

=== Las Vegas Outlaws ===
On January 30, 2015, Aumavae was assigned to the Las Vegas Outlaws.
