= Julius Williams =

American football player (born 1986)

No. 90
- Position: Defensive lineman

Personal information
- Born: July 19, 1986 (age 40); Decatur, Georgia, U.S.
- Listed height: 6 ft 2 in (1.88 m)
- Listed weight: 265 lb (120 kg)

Career information
- High school: Towers (Decatur)
- College: UConn
- NFL draft: 2009: undrafted

Career history
- Jacksonville Jaguars (2009–2010); Hartford Colonials (2010); Edmonton Eskimos (2011–2012); BC Lions (2013); San Jose SaberCats (2014); Philadelphia Soul (2014); Las Vegas Outlaws (2015)

Career NFL statistics
- Total tackles: 8
- Stats at Pro Football Reference

Career CFL statistics
- Total tackles: 26
- Sacks: 8
- Stats at CFL.ca (archived)

Julius Williams (born July 19, 1986) is an American former professional football player who was a defensive lineman in the National Football League (NFL) and Canadian Football League (CFL). He last played for the Las Vegas Outlaws of the Arena Football League (AFL). He was signed by the Jacksonville Jaguars as an undrafted free agent in 2009. He played college football at UConn Huskies.

== Professional career ==
Williams signed with the Jacksonville Jaguars in the spring of 2009 and was one of only two undrafted free agents to make the opening day roster. As a rookie, he was active for 11 games and started one contest at defensive end. He was released by Jacksonville at the final cut down in 2010 and joined Hartford of the UFL for the final weeks of that league's inaugural season.

Williams signed with the Edmonton Eskimos on April 1, 2011. He began the season on the 1-game injured list with a dislocated elbow. He was activated for Game 4 and in 15 games (15 starts) had 20 defensive tackles, 5 quarterback sacks and a tackle for a loss. Julius also started the Western Semi-Final (1 defensive tackle and a quarterback sack) and the Western Final (1 defensive tackle).

On May 15, 2014, Williams was assigned to the San Jose SaberCats of the Arena Football League (AFL). On June 2, 2014, Williams was traded to the Philadelphia Soul in exchange for Duke Robinson.

On December 22, 2014, Williams was selected by the Las Vegas Outlaws with the 4th pick of the 2014 expansion draft.

On May 8, 2015, Williams retired from professional football.
