= Myron Lewis =

American gridiron football player and coach (born 1987)

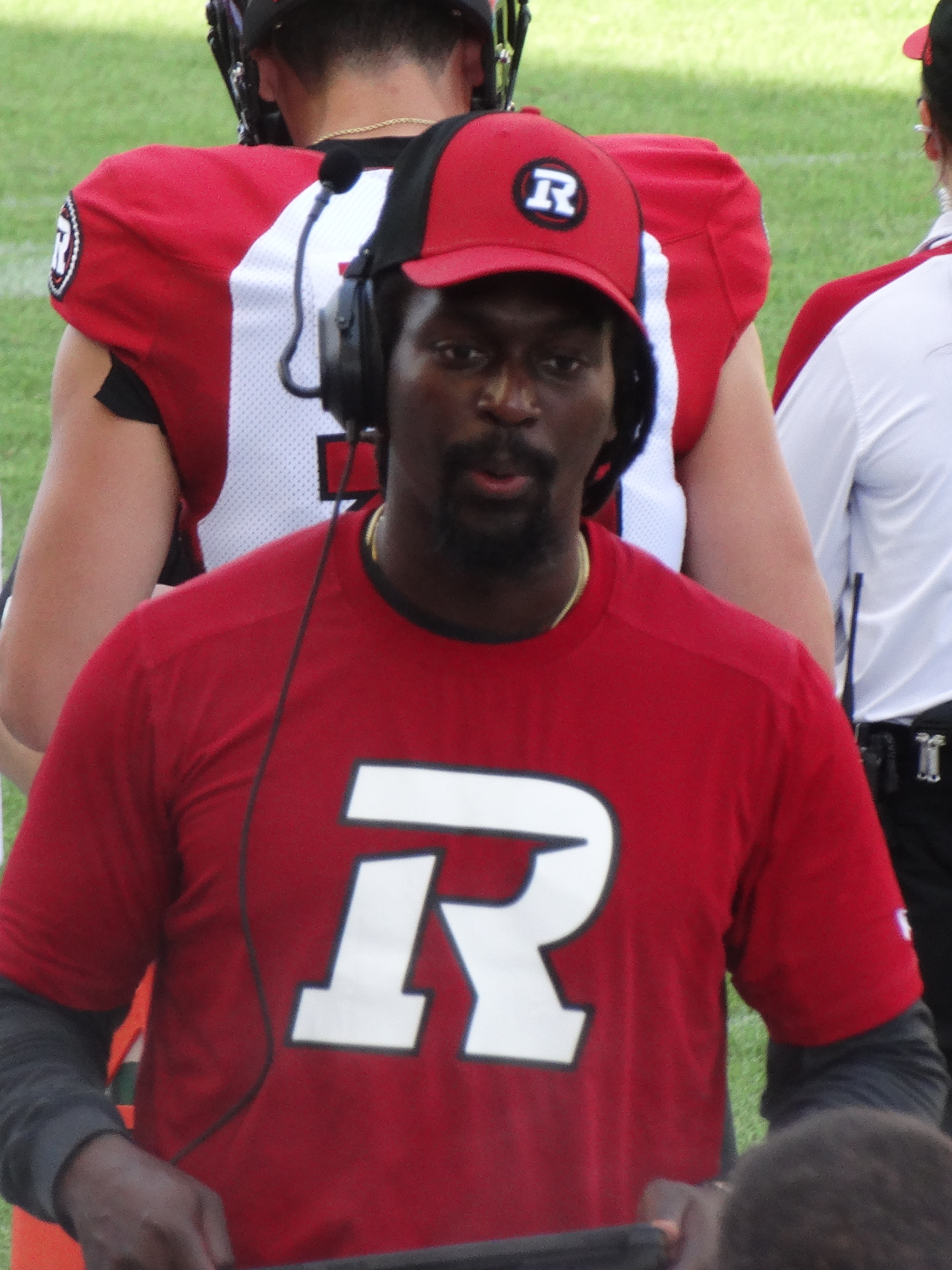
- Lewis with the Ottawa Redblacks in 2025

Personal information
- Born: November 24, 1987 (age 38); Orlando, Florida, U.S.
- Listed height: 6 ft 2 in (1.88 m)
- Listed weight: 203 lb (92 kg)

Career information
- High school: Pompano Beach (Pompano Beach, Florida)
- College: Vanderbilt (2006–2009)
- NFL draft: 2010: 3rd round, 67th overall pick

Career history

Playing
- Tampa Bay Buccaneers (2010−2012); Detroit Lions (2013)*; Edmonton Eskimos (2014)*; Blacktips (2014); Las Vegas Outlaws (2015); BC Lions (2015)*; Hudson Valley Fort (2015); Arizona Rattlers (2016)*
- * Offseason or practice squad member only

Coaching
- Toronto Argonauts (2024) (Defensive backs coach); Ottawa Redblacks (2025) (Defensive backs coach)

Awards and highlights
- Grey Cup champion (2024); Second-team All-SEC (2009)

Career NFL statistics
- Total tackles: 20
- Pass deflections: 3
- Stats at Pro Football Reference

Myron A. Lewis (born November 24, 1987) is an American former professional football player who was a cornerback in the National Football League (NFL). He was most recently the defensive backs coach for the Ottawa Redblacks of the Canadian Football League (CFL). He was selected by the Tampa Bay Buccaneers in the third round of the 2010 NFL draft. Lewis played college football for the Vanderbilt Commodores, garnering SEC honors in his junior and senior years.

== Professional career ==
=== Tampa Bay Buccaneers ===
Lewis was selected in the third round with the 67th overall in the 2010 NFL draft by the Tampa Bay Buccaneers. On August 8, 2013, Lewis was waived by the Buccaneers.

=== Detroit Lions ===
On August 11, 2013, Lewis was signed by the Detroit Lions. On August 25, 2013, he was cut by the Detroit Lions.

=== Las Vegas Outlaws ===
On January 30, 2015, Lewis was assigned to the Las Vegas Outlaws of the Arena Football League (AFL).

=== BC Lions ===
Lewis signed with the BC Lions on May 27, 2015.

=== Hudson Valley Fort ===
In the fall of 2015, Lewis signed with the Hudson Valley Fort of the Fall Experimental Football League (FXFL).

=== Arizona Rattlers ===
On October 16, 2015, Lewis was assigned to the Arizona Rattlers. On November 11, 2015, Lewis was placed on recallable reassignment.

== Coaching career ==
On May 1, 2024, it was announced that Lewis had been named defensive backs coach for the Toronto Argonauts. He won the 111th Grey Cup in his only year with the Argonauts.

On January 31, 2025, it was announced that Lewis had joined the coaching staff of the Ottawa Redblacks as the team's defensive backs coach.
