= Dee Webb =

American gridiron football player (born 1984)

No. 23, 5
- Position: Defensive back

Personal information
- Born: December 8, 1984 (age 41); Jacksonville, Florida, U.S.
- Listed height: 5 ft 11 in (1.80 m)
- Listed weight: 200 lb (91 kg)

Career information
- High school: Edward H. White (Jacksonville)
- College: Florida
- NFL draft: 2006: 7th round, 236th overall pick

Career history
- Jacksonville Jaguars (2006–2007); Philadelphia Soul (2008); Toronto Argonauts (2009)*; Calgary Stampeders (2009); Jacksonville Sharks (2010); Toronto Argonauts (2011); Hamilton Tiger-Cats (2011–2013); Calgary Stampeders (2014)*; Orlando Predators (2014); Las Vegas Outlaws (2015)
- * Offseason or practice squad member only

Awards and highlights
- ArenaBowl champion (2008); First-team All-SEC (2005)

Career NFL statistics
- Total tackles: 17
- Pass deflections: 2
- Interceptions: 1
- Stats at Pro Football Reference

Career AFL statistics
- Total tackles: 102
- Pass deflections: 22
- Interceptions: 2
- Stats at ArenaFan.com
- Stats at CFL.ca (archive)

Demetrice A. Webb (born December 8, 1984) is an American former professional football player who was a defensive back in the National Football League (NFL), Canadian Football League (CFL), and Arena Football League (AFL). Webb played college football for the University of Florida.

== Early life ==
Webb was born in Jacksonville, Florida. He attended Edward H. White High School in Jacksonville, and played high school football for the Ed White Commanders. Webb was a three-year starter, and was named The Florida Times-Union's player of the year after scoring eight times on defense and also serving as the Commanders' starting quarterback. USA Today named him to its high school All-America team, and Rivals.com ranked him as the number two cornerback prospect in the country.

== College career ==
Webb accepted an athletic scholarship to attend the University of Florida in Gainesville, Florida, where he played for coach Ron Zook and coach Urban Meyer's Florida Gators football teams from 2003 to 2005. As a junior in 2005, he started twelve games at cornerback, led the Southeastern Conference (SEC) in passes defended, and was a first-team All-SEC selection. Webb decided to forgo his senior season, and declared himself eligible for the NFL draft.

== Professional career ==
Pre-draft measurables
Height	Weight	Arm length	Hand span	40-yard dash	10-yard split	20-yard split	20-yard shuttle	Three-cone drill	Vertical jump	Broad jump
5 ft 10 3/4 in (1.80 m)	183 lb (83 kg)	31 1/4 in (0.79 m)	8 1/4 in (0.21 m)	4.44 s	1.59 s	2.59 s	4.10 s	6.92 s	36.5 in (0.93 m)	10 ft 1 in (3.07 m)
All values from NFL Combine/Pro Day

=== National Football League ===
The Jacksonville Jaguars selected Webb in the seventh round (236th overall pick) of the 2006 NFL draft. He played in eleven games with one start during his rookie season in 2006, recording seventeen tackles, one interception, and five special teams tackles. Webb was released by the Jaguars on September 1, 2007, as a training camp cut.

=== Arena Football League ===
On December 7, 2007, Webb signed with the Philadelphia Soul of the Arena Football League. During the 2008 AFL season, Webb recorded forty tackles for the Soul who went on to win ArenaBowl XXII. In 2010, Webb signed with the Jacksonville Sharks. He was released by the Sharks on August 4, 2010, in the hope of trying out for the Miami Dolphins of the NFL.

=== Canadian Football League ===
On April 27, 2009, Webb signed with the Toronto Argonauts of the Canadian Football League. He was eventually released by the Argonauts during training camp. Webb later signed a practice roster agreement with the Calgary Stampeders. He eventually started one game for the Stampeders, recording 2 defensive tackles. Webb was released by the Stampeders the following season.

On February 14, 2011, Webb re-signed with the Argonauts.

On October 11, 2011, Webb was traded to the Hamilton Tiger-Cats along with a conditional pick in the 2013 CFL draft for receiver Maurice Mann.

On May 21, 2014, Webb was traded to the Calgary Stampeders in exchange for a conditional pick in the 2015 CFL draft.

On July 1, 2014, Webb was assigned to the Orlando Predators.

On November 18, 2014, Webb as was assigned to the Las Vegas Outlaws.

== See also ==
- List of Florida Gators in the NFL draft
