= Justin Wells (American football) =

American football player (born 1988)

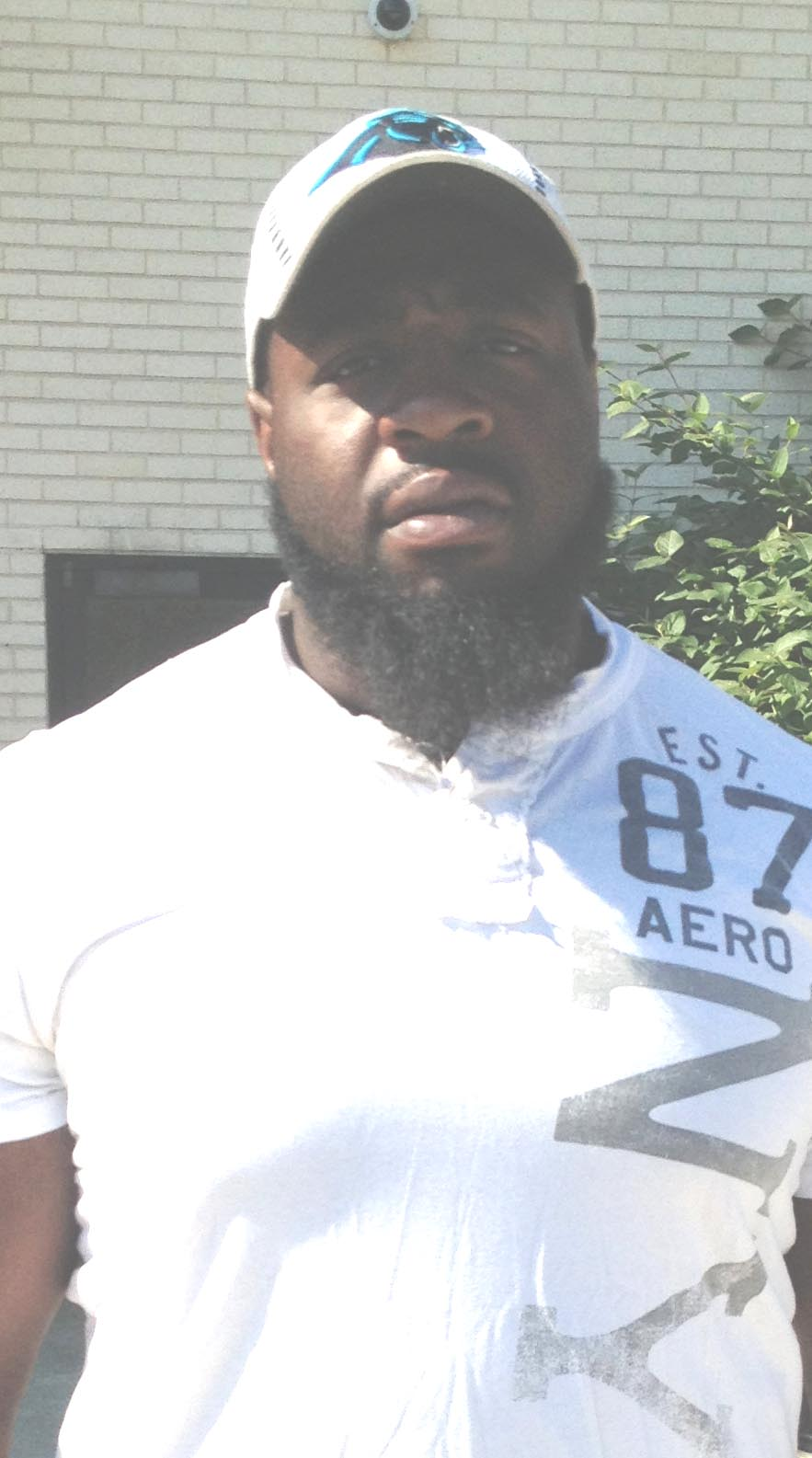

No. 74
- Position: Guard

Personal information
- Born: January 6, 1988 (age 38); Baltimore, Maryland, U.S.
- Listed height: 6 ft 4 in (1.93 m)
- Listed weight: 340 lb (154 kg)

Career information
- High school: Baltimore (MD) Polytechnic Institute
- College: St. Augustine's
- NFL draft: 2011: undrafted

Career history
- Carolina Panthers (2012−2013)*; Arizona Rattlers (2014)*; Orlando Predators (2014); Edmonton Eskimos (2014)*; Las Vegas Outlaws (2015); Philadelphia Soul (2017)*; High Country Grizzlies (2017)
- * Offseason or practice squad member only

Awards and highlights
- AP Little All-American First Team (2011)

Career AFL statistics
- Receptions: 3
- Receiving yards: 20
- Receiving TDs: 1
- Tackles: 1
- Stats at ArenaFan.com
- Stats at Pro Football Reference

Justin Wells (born January 16, 1988) is an American former football guard. He played for the High Country Grizzlies of the National Arena League (NAL).

== Background ==
Wells was born and grew up in Baltimore, Maryland. He attended Baltimore City Public Schools and graduated in 2006 from the Baltimore Polytechnic Institute. While at Poly he played football and threw the shot on the school's track team.

=== College career ===
Wells was the starting right guard and a key member of an offensive that set St. Augustine College's single season records for points (28.3) and total offensive yards (318.5) in 2010. That season, the Falcons won the Pioneer Bowl, defeating nationally ranked Fort Valley State 20-9. It was the first bowl win in school history.

Inn 2010, Wells was selected to play in two postseason all-star games: the Dixie Gridiron Classic and HBCU Classic.

Wells graduated with a degree in political science from St. Augustine's University.

== Professional career ==
=== Carolina Panthers ===
On August 8, 2012, Wells was signed by the Carolina Panthers. On August 24, 2013, he was waived by the Panthers.

=== Arizona Rattlers ===
On October 2, 2013, Wells was assigned to the Arizona Rattlers of the Arena Football League.

=== Orlando Predators ===
On January 16, 2014, Wells was traded to the Orlando Predators, along with 3 other players, for Quinn Pitcock.

=== Las Vegas Outlaws ===
On March 27, 2015, Wells was assigned to the Las Vegas Outlaws. He was placed on reassignment on July 15, 2015. On July 17, 2015, Wells was again assigned to the Outlaws.

=== Philadelphia Soul ===
On February 20, 2017, Wells was assigned to the Philadelphia Soul. On May 1, 2017, Wells was placed on recallable reassignment.
