= Jomo Wilson =

American football player (born 1983)

No. 5, 15
- Position: Wide receiver

Personal information
- Born: September 22, 1983 (age 43); Stockton, California, U.S.
- Listed height: 6 ft 0 in (1.83 m)
- Listed weight: 200 lb (91 kg)

Career information
- High school: Stockton (CA) Stagg
- College: Eastern Oregon
- NFL draft: 2007: undrafted

Career history
- Central Valley Coyotes (2007–2008); Boise Burn (2009); Jacksonville Sharks (2010–2011); San Antonio Talons (2012–2014); Jacksonville Sharks (2014); Las Vegas Outlaws (2015)

Awards and highlights
- ArenaBowl champion (2011)

Career AFL statistics
- Receptions: 582
- Yards: 7,493
- Touchdowns: 172
- Kick Return yards: 2,152
- Kick Return TDs: 6
- Stats at ArenaFan.com

Jomo Wilson (born September 22, 1983) is an American former football wide receiver. He played for the University of Toledo before transferring to Eastern Oregon University. He was signed as an undrafted free agent by the Central Valley Coyotes in 2007. In 2009, Wilson signed with the Boise Burn. He then moved on to the Jacksonville Sharks where he played for two years, 2010 and 2011. In 2011, Wilson hauled in 131 receptions for 1,737 yards and 44 touchdowns, helping his team win ArenaBowl XXIV.

== College career ==
Wilson attended the University of Toledo before transferring to San Joaquin Delta College. Upon completing his degree at San Joaquin Delta, Wilson continued his football career at Eastern Oregon University.

== Professional career ==
Wilson has been good friends with Aaron Garcia during his time in the Arena Football League. On April 14, 2014, Wilson was traded by to the Sharks for future considerations. On March 14, 2015, Wilson was traded, along with Nyere Aumaitre and Undra Hendrix, for Derrick Ross,
