= Las Vegas Outlaws (arena football) =

Arena football team

Logo

General information
- Founded: 2014
- Folded: 2015
- Headquartered: Las Vegas, Nevada at the Thomas & Mack Center
- Colors: Black, Vegas gold

Personnel
- Owner: Arena Football League
- Head coach: Aaron Garcia
- President: Scotty Gelt

Team history
- Las Vegas Outlaws (2015)

Home fields
- Thomas & Mack Center (2015)

League / conference affiliations
- Arena Football League (2015): National Conference (2015); West Division (2015)

The Las Vegas Outlaws were a professional Arena Football League (AFL) team based in Las Vegas, Nevada. They played in the AFL's National Conference West Division in 2015. The franchise was owned by Vince Neil, lead singer for Mötley Crüe and former minority owner of the Jacksonville Sharks. On September 11, 2014, it was announced that Aaron Garcia was to be the team's first head coach.

This was the third and most recent attempt at an AFL franchise in Las Vegas since two other teams played briefly, the Las Vegas Sting from 1994 to 1995 before relocating to Anaheim and becoming the Anaheim Piranhas and the Las Vegas Gladiators from 2003 to 2007 before they relocated to Cleveland. Neil won approval from the league for the franchise on June 17, 2014. According to reports from ESPN, he asked to name his team the "Las Vegas Outlaws", not to be confused with the former XFL franchise from 2001 of the same name. That wish was granted on August 22, 2014, when the announcement was officially made that the team would indeed be called the Outlaws.

After initial rumors had the team playing at the MGM Grand Garden Arena, the team actually played at the Thomas & Mack Center on the campus of UNLV, previous home to the Sting and Gladiators.

== History ==
Vince Neil joined fellow musicians Jon Bon Jovi, Tim McGraw and Kiss band members Gene Simmons and Paul Stanley that have started AFL franchises. Bon Jovi created the Philadelphia Soul in 2004, while McGraw, a country music star, was minority owner of Bud Adams's version of the Nashville Kats from 2005 to 2007. Simmons and Stanley founded the Los Angeles KISS which existed from 2013 until 2016 and played at the Honda Center in Anaheim, former home of the Piranhas. Neil was named minority owner of the Jacksonville Sharks just two months prior to the formation of his own team.

=== League takeover and demise ===
On July 12, 2015, ArenaFan.com reported that the Outlaws and the New Orleans VooDoo were to be taken over by the league due to poor attendance and financial issues. Both teams were expected to finish the season, then commissioner Scott Butera would conduct a search for new owners. The scheduled game between the Outlaws and the VooDoo was cancelled and declared a tie. Vince Neil was supposedly likely to have returned as majority owner, but a new ownership group would have had to be formed. However, on August 9, 2015 it was announced that the Outlaws would cease operations effective immediately, despite having qualified for the 2015 playoffs. They were replaced as the fourth and final seed in the National Conference by the Portland Thunder.

== Final roster ==
Las Vegas Outlaws roster
Quarterbacks: 12 Sean Brackett; 11 J. J. Raterink; Fullbacks: Currently vacant; Wide receivers: -- Larry Beavers; 18 LaDon Hudson; 1 Clinton Solomon; 21 Doug Williams; 10 Jason Willis	Offensive linemen: 55 Nyere Aumaitre; 60 Terrence Campbell; 71 Kevin Myers; 74 Justin Wells; 54 Zack Williams; 72 Will Wright; Defensive linemen: 23 Terrance Carter; 54 Jabari Fletcher; 53 Mike Lewis; 33 Mark Weivoda	Linebackers: 17 Wesley Mauia; Defensive backs: 7 Ray Little; 6 Eddie Moten; 2 Demarcus Robinson; 3 Matt Vinal; Kickers: 14 Ernesto Lacayo	Injured reserve: 99 Junior Aumavae DL; 2 Donovan Henley DB; 78 Jeff Nady OL; 95 Ernest Owusu DL; 6 Wesley Pendleton DB; 19 Tysson Poots WR; 20 Tanner Varner LB; 15 Jomo Wilson WR; League suspension: 62 Brandyn Dombrowski OL; 14 Ross Gornall K; 95 Matt Hardison DL; 90 Romelle Jones LB; 91 Brandon Peguese DL; 27 Jamarko Simmons WR; 5 Dee Webb DB; Refuse to report: 23 Myron Lewis DB; -- Abe Markowitz OL; -- Julius Williams DL; Other league exempt: Currently vacant; Inactive reserve: 42 Joe Mortensen FB; 3 Gerald Young WR; Recallable reassignment: Currently vacant; Rookies in italics; Roster updated August 12, 2015; 22 Active, 21 Inactive

== Head coaches ==
Name	Term	Regular season				Playoffs		Awards
Name	Term	W	L	T	Win%	W	L	Awards
Aaron Garcia	2015	5	12	1	.306	0	0	

== Season-by-season results ==
ArenaBowl champions	ArenaBowl appearance	Division champions	Playoff berth

Season	League	Conference	Division	Regular season				Postseason results
Season	League	Conference	Division	Finish	Wins	Losses	Ties	Postseason results
2015	AFL	American	West	2nd	5	12	1	
Total					5	12	1	(includes only regular season)
Total					0	0	—	(includes only the postseason)
Total					5	12	1	(includes both regular season and postseason)
