= Pacific Division (AFL) =

Division of the Arena Football League

Pacific
- Conference: National Conference
- League: Arena Football League
- Sport: Arena football
- Founded: 1995 (as the Central Division, as a member of the American Conference)
- Most recent champion: San Jose SaberCats (2nd title)
- Most titles: Chicago Rush (6 titles)

The Pacific Division, formerly the Central Division, was a division in the Arena Football League. The division was part of both the American and National Conferences at different points in its history. The division was first formed in 1995 when expansion teams were formed and put into the current divisions.

== Division lineups ==
1995–1996

- Iowa Barnstormers
- St. Louis Stampede
- Memphis Pharaohs
- Milwaukee Mustangs

Creation of the Central Division as part of the American Conference. Iowa, St. Louis, and Memphis are enfranchised for this division.

1997

- Iowa Barnstormers
- Milwaukee Mustangs
- Portland Forest Dragons
- Texas Terror

Memphis moved to Portland as the Forest Dragons. St. Louis Stampede folded. Texas Terror moved in from National Conference's Southern Division.

1998–2000

- Grand Rapids Rampage
- Houston Thunderbears
- Iowa Barnstormers
- Milwaukee Mustangs

Grand Rapids Rampage enfranchised. Portland moved to American Conference's Western Division. Texas Terror renamed Houston Thunderbears.

2001

- Chicago Rush
- Detroit Fury
- Grand Rapids Rampage
- Indiana Firebirds
- Milwaukee Mustangs

Albany from National Conference's Eastern Division moved into this division as Indiana Firebirds, relocated in Indianapolis. Chicago Rush and Detroit Fury enfranchised. Houston moved to Western Division. Iowa moved to Uniondale, New York as New York Dragons.

2002

- Chicago Rush
- Detroit Fury
- Grand Rapids Rampage
- Indiana Firebirds

Milwaukee Mustangs folded.

2003

- Chicago Rush
- Dallas Desperados
- Grand Rapids Rampage
- Indiana Firebirds

Dallas moved in from Western Division. Detroit Fury moved to Eastern Division.

2004

- Chicago Rush
- Colorado Crush
- Detroit Fury
- Grand Rapids Rampage
- Indiana Firebirds

Colorado moved in from Western Division. Dallas moved to Eastern Division. Detroit moved back from Eastern Division.

2005–2006

- Chicago Rush
- Colorado Crush
- Grand Rapids Rampage
- Nashville Kats

Detroit and Indiana folded. Nashville Kats (not to be confused with Georgia Force of the Southern Division which are the original Kats team) enfranchised.

2007

- Chicago Rush
- Colorado Crush
- Grand Rapids Rampage
- Kansas City Brigade
- Nashville Kats

Kansas City moved in from Southern Division.

2008

- Chicago Rush
- Colorado Crush
- Grand Rapids Rampage
- Kansas City Brigade

Nashville folded. Kansas City suspended. The AFL has been put on a one-year hiatus in 2009.

2010

- Chicago Rush
- Cleveland Gladiators
- Iowa Barnstormers
- Milwaukee Iron

Central Division moved to National Conference as Midwest Division. Cleveland moved in from Eastern Division (which is moved to the American Conference for this season as the Southwest Division). Milwaukee Iron as well as the second Iowa Barnstormers franchise (not to be confused with the original one known as the New York Dragons) moved in from the now-defunct AF2.

2011

- Chicago Rush
- Dallas Vigilantes
- Iowa Barnstormers
- Kansas City Command
- Tulsa Talons

The Midwest Division changed its name back to Central Division. Dallas and Tulsa moved in from Southwest Division (now Eastern Division). Cleveland and Milwaukee moved to the Eastern Division. Kansas City reactivated.

2012

- Chicago Rush
- Iowa Barnstormers
- Kansas City Command
- San Antonio Talons

Dallas suspended, Tulsa relocated to San Antonio.

2013

- Chicago Rush
- Iowa Barnstormers
- San Antonio Talons

Kansas City folded.

2014–2015

- Portland Thunder
- San Jose SaberCats
- Spokane Shock

Central Division becomes Pacific Division. Portland enfranchised, Chicago folded, Iowa was moved to the East Division, and San Antonio was moved to the West Division.

After 2015, divisions were eliminated in favor of conferences due to declining team count.

== Division Champions ==
- 1995: St. Louis Stampede (9–3)
- 1996: Iowa Barnstormers (12–2)
- 1997: Iowa Barnstormers (11–3)
- 1998: Houston Thunderbears (8–6)
- 1999: Iowa Barnstormers (11–3)
- 2000: Iowa Barnstormers (9–5)
- 2001: Grand Rapids Rampage (11–3)
- 2002: Chicago Rush (9–5)
- 2003: Dallas Desperados (10–6)
- 2004: Chicago Rush (11–5)
- 2005: Colorado Crush (10–6)
- 2006: Colorado Crush (11–5)
- 2007: Chicago Rush (12–4)
- 2008: Chicago Rush (11–5)
- 2010 (as Midwest Division): Milwaukee Iron (11–5)
- 2011: Chicago Rush (13–5)
- 2012: San Antonio Talons (14–4)
- 2013: Chicago Rush (10–8)
- 2014: San Jose SaberCats (13–5)
- 2015: San Jose SaberCats (17–1)
