= 1998 San Diego Chargers season =

NFL team 39th season

- Owner: Alex Spanos
- General manager: Bobby Beathard
- Head coach: Kevin Gilbride (fired October 14, 2–4 record); June Jones (interim, 3–7 record)
- Home stadium: Qualcomm Stadium

Results
- Record: 5–11
- Division place: 5th AFC West
- Playoffs: Did not qualify
- All-Pros: 2: S Rodney Harrison (1st team); LB Junior Seau (1st team)
- Pro Bowlers: 2: S Rodney Harrison; LB Junior Seau

The 1998 San Diego Chargers season was the franchise's 29th season in the National Football League (NFL), its 39th overall and was the second and final season under Kevin Gilbride. After a 2–4 start, Gilbride was fired and June Jones coached the final ten games of the season as interim head coach, the team going 3–7 under his stewardship. San Diego's defense led the league in yards allowed; however, a weak offense under infamous draft bust quarterback Ryan Leaf meant that the team was last in the AFC West. The team scored a total of 241 points, an average of 15.1 points per game, the second lowest in the NFL, with only the Philadelphia Eagles performing worse with 161 (10.1 per game).

With the retirement of Stan Humphries, the Chargers went into the draft seeking a new quarterback. There were two outstanding prospects; when Indianapolis took future Hall of Famer Peyton Manning as the #1 pick, Leaf went to San Diego. Immediately named the starter, he began 2–0 before an infamous performance at Kansas City, after which he was caught on camera shouting at a reporter.

Leaf finished with 15 interceptions and only two touchdown passes in ten games; Craig Whelihan replaced him as the starter for the final seven games, but also performed poorly. The two combined for 34 interceptions, the worst tally in the NFL for a decade; San Diego had 51 turnovers in total, 8 more than any other team in 1998. The inexperienced quarterbacks were hampered by the departure of star receiver Tony Martin during the offseason. Leaf's passer rating in 1998 was only 39, which was an NFL-worst. No starting quarterback since then has matched this number or beaten it. In his absence, Charlie Jones led the team with 699 yards, while tight end Freddie Jones had the most receptions with 57. Natrone Means returned to lead the rushing attack after two seasons in Jacksonville. He performed well prior to a season-ending injury, gaining 883 yards in ten games, or 88.3 yards a game.

On defense, Norman Hand was promoted to starting defensive tackle, and led the team with 6.0 sacks; Greg Jackson had the most interceptions, with six. His six interceptions were the most by a Charger since Darren Carrington intercepted 7 passes in 1993.

Pro bowlers Junior Seau and Rodney Harrison made 115 and 114 tackles respectively – the most any other player had was 63. Kicker John Carney, who had been injured for most of the previous season, returned and converted 26 attempts out of 30.

The ineffective offense and rookie Leaf's obnoxious behavior toward teammates damaged morale; outside linebacker Lew Bush recalled

"Try going into a game you have no chance of winning, knowing that if you give up more than one touchdown, it's over

Strong safety Rodney Harrison described the season as

a nightmare you can't even imagine. If I had to go through another year like that, I'd probably quit playing".

Following the season, Oregon State head coach Mike Riley was named Chargers' head coach.

== Offseason ==
=== NFL draft ===
1998 San Diego Chargers draft
Round	Pick	Player	Position	College	Notes
1	2	Ryan Leaf	Quarterback	Washington State	from Arizona
2	59	Mikhael Ricks	Tight end	Stephen F. Austin	
5	126	Cedric Harden	Defensive end	Florida A&M	
6	155	Clifford Ivory	Cornerback	Troy State	
7	194	Jon Haskins	Linebacker	Stanford	
7	234	Kio Sanford	Wide receiver	Kentucky	
Made roster * Made at least one Pro Bowl during career

=== Supplemental draft ===
1998 San Diego Chargers draft
Round	Pick	Player	Position	College	Notes
2	2	Jamal Williams *	Defensive tackle	Oklahoma State	
Made roster * Made at least one Pro Bowl during career

=== Undrafted free agents ===
1998 undrafted free agents of note
Player	Position	College
Jeff Baker	Quarterback	Wisconsin–La Crosse
Jeremy Earp	Wide receiver	Wisconsin–La Crosse

== Personnel ==
=== Staff ===
1998 San Diego Chargers staff
Front office: chairman of the board – Alex Spanos; President/vice chairman – Dean Spanos; general manager – Bobby Beathard; Director of player personnel – Billy Devaney; Director of pro personnel – Greg Gaines; Coordinator of football operations – Ed McGuire; Head coaches: Head coach – Kevin Gilbride; Assistant head coach – Nick Nicolau; Offensive coaches: Offensive coordinator – Mike Sheppard; Quarterbacks – June Jones; Running backs – Ollie Wilson; Tight ends – Bill MacDermott; Offensive line – Joe Bugel; Offensive assistant – Mike Cavanaugh	Defensive coaches: Defensive coordinator – Joe Pascale; Defensive line – Wayne Nunnely; Linebackers – Jim Vechiarella; Defensive backs – Rod Perry; Defensive assistant – Kevin Lempa; Special teams coaches: Special teams – Frank Novak; Strength and conditioning: Strength and conditioning – John Hastings

=== Roster ===
1998 San Diego Chargers roster
Quarterbacks (QB): 7 Jeff Baker; 16 Ryan Leaf; 5 Craig Whelihan; Running backs (RB): 43 Kenny Bynum; 41 Terrell Fletcher; 20 Natrone Means; 34 Tremayne Stephens; Wide receivers (WR): 85 Tony Gaiter; 82 Charlie Jones; 10 Mikhael Ricks; 80 Bryan Still; 87 Ryan Thelwell; Tight ends (TE): 83 John Burke; 81 Wendell Davis; 89 Frank Hartley; 88 Freddie Jones	Offensive linemen (OL): 67 Roman Fortin C; 71 DeMingo Graham G; 65 John Jackson T; 64 Kendyl Jacox G; 63 Raleigh McKenzie G; 79 Marcus Price T; 74 Raleigh Roundtree T; 72 Troy Sienkiewicz G; 73 Aaron Taylor G; Defensive linemen (DL): 90 Marco Coleman DE; 95 William Fuller DE; 96 Norman Hand DT; 99 Raylee Johnson DE; 94 Chris Mims DE; 98 Mike Mohring DT; 97 John Parrella DT; 76 Jamal Williams DT	Linebackers (LB): 52 James Burgess OLB; 51 Gerald Dixon OLB; 54 Kurt Gouveia MLB; 53 Michael Hamilton OLB; 55 Junior Seau OLB; 56 Steve Tovar MLB; Defensive backs (DB): 31 Willie Clark CB; 27 Charles Dimry CB; 33 Dedrick Dodge FS; 37 Rodney Harrison SS; 42 Greg Jackson FS; 36 Lloyd Lee FS; 26 Reggie Rusk CB; 29 Terrance Shaw CB; 22 Jimmy Spencer CB; 21 Scott Turner CB; 23 Gerome Williams SS; Special teams (ST): 2 Darren Bennett P; 50 David Binn LS; 3 John Carney K	Practice squad: -- Israel Ifeanyi DE; -- Bill Kushner P; 17 Anthony Rodgers WR; -- Justin Watson RB; Reserve: 25 Paul Bradford CB (IR); 58 Lewis Bush LB (IR); 93 Reuben Davis DT (IR); 20 Mike Dumas S (IR); 92 Cedric Harden DE (IR); 28 Dwayne Harper CB (IR); 70 Vaughn Parker T (IR); 84 Webster Slaughter WR (IR); Rookies in italics 53 active, 8 reserve, 4 practice squad

== Preseason ==
Week	Date	Opponent	Result	Record	Venue	Attendance
1	August 8	San Francisco 49ers	W 27–21	1–0	Qualcomm Stadium	
2	August 15	St. Louis Rams	W 41–27	2–0	Qualcomm Stadium	
3	August 22	at Indianapolis Colts	W 33–3	3–0	RCA Dome	
4	August 28	at Minnesota Vikings	L 28–42	3–1	Hubert H. Humphrey Metrodome	

== Regular season ==
=== Schedule ===
Week	Date	Opponent	Result	Record	Venue	Attendance
1	September 6	Buffalo Bills	**W** 16–14	1–0	Qualcomm Stadium	64,037
2	September 13	at Tennessee Oilers	**W** 13–7	2–0	Vanderbilt Stadium	41,089
3	September 20	at **Kansas City Chiefs**	**L** 7–23	2–1	Arrowhead Stadium	73,730
4	September 27	New York Giants	**L** 16–34	2–2	Qualcomm Stadium	55,672
5	October 4	at Indianapolis Colts	**L** 12–17	2–3	RCA Dome	51,988
6	October 11	at **Oakland Raiders**	**L** 6–7	2–4	Network Associates Coliseum	42,467
7	October 18	Philadelphia Eagles	**W** 13–10	3–4	Qualcomm Stadium	56,967
8	October 25	**Seattle Seahawks**	**L** 20–27	3–5	Qualcomm Stadium	58,512
9	Bye					
10	November 8	at **Denver Broncos**	**L** 10–27	3–6	Mile High Stadium	74,925
11	November 15	Baltimore Ravens	**W** 14–13	4–6	Qualcomm Stadium	54,388
12	November 22	**Kansas City Chiefs**	**W** 38–37	5–6	Qualcomm Stadium	59,894
13	November 29	**Denver Broncos**	**L** 16–31	5–7	Qualcomm Stadium	66,532
14	December 6	at Washington Redskins	**L** 20–24	5–8	Jack Kent Cooke Stadium	65,713
15	December 13	at **Seattle Seahawks**	**L** 17–38	5–9	Kingdome	62,690
16	December 20	**Oakland Raiders**	**L** 10–17	5–10	Qualcomm Stadium	60,716
17	December 27	at Arizona Cardinals	**L** 13–16	5–11	Sun Devil Stadium	71,670
Note: Intra-division opponents are in **bold** text.

=== Game summaries ===
==== Week 1: vs. Buffalo Bills ====
Week One: Buffalo Bills at San Diego Chargers – Game summary

Quarter	1	2	3	4	Total
Bills	0	0	7	7	**14**
**Chargers**	3	0	10	3	**16**

at Qualcomm Stadium, San Diego, California

- Date: September 6
- Game time: 1:15 p.m. PDT
- Game weather: 73 °F (22.8 °C), relative humidity 83%, wind 9 mph
- Game attendance: 64,037
- Referee: Ron Blum
- TV announcers (CBS): Gus Johnson and Steve Tasker
- Box score

Game information

**First quarter**

- SDG – John Carney 48-yard field goal, 1:06. Chargers 3–0. **Drive: 9 plays, 45 yards, 5:19.**

**Second quarter**

- No scoring plays.

**Third quarter**

- SDG – Bryan Still 6-yard pass from Ryan Leaf (John Carney kick), 13:16. Chargers 10–0. **Drive: 3 plays, 72 yards, 1:44.**
- BUF – Andre Reed 43-yard pass from Doug Flutie (Steve Christie kick), 8:50. Chargers 10–7. **Drive: 1 play, 66 yards, 0:12.**
- SDG – John Carney 47-yard field goal, 3:00. Chargers 13–7. **Drive: 12 plays, 61 yards, 5:50.**

**Fourth quarter**

- BUF – Andre Reed 5-yard pass from Doug Flutie (Steve Christie kick), 9:05. Bills 14–13. **Drive: 8 plays, 31 yards, 4:52.**
- SDG – John Carney 54-yard field goal, 4:30. Chargers 16–14. **Drive: 9 plays, 28 yards, 4:35.**

**Top passers**

- BUF – Doug Flutie – 12/20, 158 yards, 2 TD, INT
- SDG – Ryan Leaf – 16/31, 192 yards, TD, 2 INT

**Top rushers**

- BUF – Antowain Smith – 20 rushes, 54 yards
- SDG – Natrone Means – 15 rushes, 57 yards

**Top receivers**

- BUF – Andre Reed – 7 receptions, 94 yards, 2 TD
- SDG – Bryan Still – 6 receptions, 128 yards, TD

A missed field goal allowed the Chargers to escape with a win on Ryan Leaf's debut. Leaf had an uncertain start, fumbling his first snap (the Chargers recovered), and throwing an interception in Bills' territory. The San Diego defense, however, allowed only 73 yards in the first half, and the Chargers led 3–0 at the break.

Leaf found Bryan Still for 67 yards on the first play of the 3rd quarter, and hit the same player on a fade route two plays later for his first NFL touchdown pass. However, with San Diego up 13–7 in the 4th quarter, Leaf threw his second interception, setting up Buffalo for a 31-yard drive culminating when Doug Flutie and Andre Reed combined for their second touchdown pass of the day. John Carney's 54-yard field goal on the next possession clipped the upright but still went through, restoring the lead.

Buffalo faced a 4th and 26 on their final possession, but a 36-yard pass interference penalty on Terrence Shaw kept the drive going. Seven plays later, Steve Christie, who had earlier missed from just 21 yards out, pushed a 39-yarder wide left with three seconds left, and the Chargers had the win.

This game constituted the first time since 1985 that the Chargers played the Buffalo Bills. The reason for this is that before the admission of the Texans in 2002, NFL scheduling formulas for games outside a team's division were much more influenced by table position during the previous season.

==== Week 2: at Tennessee Oilers ====
Week Two: San Diego Chargers at Tennessee Oilers – Game summary

Quarter	1	2	3	4	Total
**Chargers**	3	3	7	0	**13**
Oilers	0	7	0	0	**7**

at Vanderbilt Stadium, Nashville, Tennessee

- Date: September 13
- Game time: 12:00 p.m. CDT
- Game weather: 76 °F (24.4 °C), relative humidity 47%, wind 4 mph
- Game attendance: 41,089
- Referee: Tom White
- TV announcers (CBS): Kevin Harlan and Sam Wyche
- Box score

Game information

**First quarter**

- SDG – John Carney 48-yard field goal, 2:27. Chargers 3–0. **Drive: 11 plays, 51 yards, 5:35.**

**Second quarter**

- SDG – John Carney 23-yard field goal, 4:30. Chargers 6–0. **Drive: 14 plays, 83 yards, 6:55.**
- TEN – Frank Wycheck 15-yard pass from Steve McNair (Al Del Greco kick), 0:22. Oilers 7–6. **Drive: 14 plays, 80 yards, 4:08.**

**Third quarter**

- SDG – Natrone Means 1-yard run (John Carney kick), 3:53. Chargers 13–7. **Drive: 8 plays, 72 yards, 4:51.**

**Fourth quarter**

- No scoring plays.

**Top passers**

- SDG – Ryan Leaf – 13/24, 179 yards
- TEN – Steve McNair – 20/34, 193 yards, TD

**Top rushers**

- SDG – Natrone Means – 23 rushes, 87 yards, TD
- TEN – Steve McNair – 3 rushes, 31 yards

**Top receivers**

- SDG – Bryan Still – 3 receptions, 59 yards
- TEN – Frank Wycheck – 7 receptions, 55 yards, TD

Another strong defensive performance gave San Diego their second win. The lone Tennessee score was aided by a fake punt on 4th and 10; after Natrone Means put the Chargers up 13–7 in the 3rd quarter, the Oilers failed to cross midfield in their final four possessions. Ryan Leaf had a cleaner game, passing for 179 yards with no turnovers, while rushing for 31 yards, including a 20-yard scramble that set up Means' touchdown. Leaf became the first rookie to start 2–0 since John Elway in 1983, but would win only twice more in his entire career.

==== Week 3: at Kansas City Chiefs ====
Week Three: San Diego Chargers at Kansas City Chiefs – Game summary

Quarter	1	2	3	4	Total
Chargers	0	0	7	0	**7**
**Chiefs**	6	10	7	0	**23**

at Arrowhead Stadium, Kansas City, Missouri

- Date: September 20
- Game time: 12:00 p.m. CDT
- Game weather: 71 °F (21.7 °C), relative humidity 86%, wind 10 mph
- Game attendance: 73,730
- Referee: Dick Hantak
- TV announcers (CBS): Kevin Harlan and Sam Wyche
- Box score

Game information

**First quarter**

- KAN – Pete Stoyanovich 35-yard field goal, 10:37. Chiefs 3–0. **Drive: 8 plays, 23 yards, 2:42.**
- KAN – Pete Stoyanovich 31-yard field goal, 2:11. Chiefs 6–0. **Drive: 11 plays, 47 yards, 6:44.**

**Second quarter**

- KAN – Pete Stoyanovich 33-yard field goal, 14:52. Chiefs 9–0. **Drive: 5 plays, 9 yards, 1:26.**
- KAN – Andre Rison 44-yard pass from Rich Gannon (Pete Stoyanovich kick), 13:37. Chiefs 16–0. **Drive: 3 plays, 41 yards, 0:54.**

**Third quarter**

- KAN – Tony Richardson 1-yard run (Pete Stoyanovich kick), 12:28. Chiefs 23–0. **Drive: 1 play, 37 yards, 0:11.**
- SDG – Natrone Means 72-yard run (John Carney kick), 4:25. Chiefs 23–7. **Drive: 1 play, 72 yards, 0:14.**

**Fourth quarter**

- No scoring plays.

**Top passers**

- SDG – Ryan Leaf – 1/15, 4 yards, 2 INT
- KAN – Rich Gannon – 10/29, 144 yards, TD

**Top rushers**

- SDG – Natrone Means – 22 rushes, 165 yards, TD
- KAN – Donnell Bennett – 30 rushes, 87 yards

**Top receivers**

- SDG – Freddie Jones – 1 reception, 4 yards
- KAN – Andre Rison – 1 reception, 44 yards, TD

The Chiefs' defense brought Ryan Leaf savagely back down to earth, as he posted the only 0.0 passer rating by any QB during the 1998 season. Leaf completed 1 pass in 15 attempts for 4 yards, with no touchdowns and two interceptions – he also lost three fumbles, committing five turnovers on the Chargers' first seven possessions. With a pair of sacks pushing them to minus-19 net passing yards, the Chargers had the worst total by any NFL team for 13 years.

Natrone Means was the lone bright spot on offense; he ran 22 times for a career-high 165 yards, and prevented the shutout with a career-long 72 yard touchdown run.

==== Week 4: vs. New York Giants ====
Week Four: New York Giants at San Diego Chargers – Game summary

Quarter	1	2	3	4	Total
**Giants**	14	7	7	6	**34**
Chargers	0	6	10	0	**16**

at Qualcomm Stadium, San Diego, California

- Date: September 27
- Game time: 1:15 p.m. PDT
- Game weather: 66 °F (18.9 °C), relative humidity 69%, wind 7 mph
- Game attendance: 55,672
- Referee: Phil Luckett
- TV announcers (FOX): Dick Stockton and Matt Millen
- Box score

Game information

**First quarter**

- NYG – Gary Brown 4-yard run (Brad Daluiso kick), 4:08. Giants 7–0. **Drive: 12 plays, 70 yards, 4:01.**
- NYG – Chris Calloway 25-yard pass from Danny Kanell (Brad Daluiso kick), 0:50. Giants 14–0. **Drive: 2 plays, 27 yards, 0:38.**

**Second quarter**

- NYG – Charles Way 1-yard run (Brad Daluiso kick), 7:52. Giants 21–0. **Drive: 10 plays, 61 yards, 4:23.**
- SDG – John Carney 41-yard field goal, 1:51. Giants 21–3. **Drive: 8 plays, 41 yards, 2:21.**
- SDG – John Carney 46-yard field goal, 0:00. Giants 21–6. **Drive: 5 plays, 32 yards, 0:51.**

**Third quarter**

- SDG – John Carney 34-yard field goal, 9:33. Giants 21–9. **Drive: 7 plays, 48 yards, 3:43.**
- NYG – Percy Ellsworth 20-yard interception return (Brad Daluiso kick), 7:38. Giants 28–9.
- SDG – Charlie Jones 41-yard pass from Craig Whelihan (John Carney kick), 5:28. Giants 28–16. **Drive: 4 plays, 63 yards, 2:10.**

**Fourth quarter**

- NYG – Brad Daluiso 32-yard field goal, 11:43. Giants 31–16. **Drive: 7 plays, 23 yards, 2:05.**
- NYG – Brad Daluiso 19-yard field goal, 4:48. Giants 34–16. **Drive: 7 plays, 45 yards, 3:52.**

**Top passers**

- NYG – Danny Kanell – 17/33, 208 yards, TD, INT
- SDG – Ryan Leaf – 15/34, 193 yards, 4 INT

**Top rushers**

- NYG – Gary Brown – 20 rushes, 66 yards, TD
- SDG – Natrone Means – 11 rushes, 56 yards

**Top receivers**

- NYG – Chris Calloway – 6 receptions, 94 yards, TD
- SDG – Bryan Still – 8 receptions, 104 yards

Leaf struggled again, throwing interceptions on three consecutive first half possessions as the Giants built a 21–0 lead. An improvement saw John Carney hit three field goals in quick succession, sandwiched around the halftime break, closing the gap to 12 points. However, Leaf then threw a fourth interception, this one returned by Percy Ellsworth for a touchdown. The rookie QB was then benched for Craig Whelihan, who promptly hit Charlie Jones for a 41-yard touchdown, but could get the team no closer. This would be the Chargers last loss to the Giants until 2025.

==== Week 5: at Indianapolis Colts ====
Week Five: San Diego Chargers at Indianapolis Colts – Game summary

Quarter	1	2	3	4	Total
Chargers	0	6	0	6	**12**
**Colts**	11	0	0	6	**17**

at RCA Dome, Indianapolis, Indiana

- Date: October 4
- Game time: 1:00 p.m. EDT
- Game weather: Dome
- Game attendance: 51,988
- Referee: Bill Carollo
- TV announcers (CBS): Gus Johnson and Steve Tasker
- Box score

Game information

**First quarter**

- IND – Marshall Faulk 19-yard pass from Peyton Manning (Ken Dilger run), 8:37. Colts 8–0. **Drive: 7 plays, 44 yards, 3:44.**
- IND – Mike Vanderjagt 48-yard field goal, 4:11. Colts 11–0. **Drive: 4 plays, 5 yards, 1:27.**

**Second quarter**

- SDG – John Carney 50-yard field goal, 14:12. Colts 11–3. **Drive: 8 plays, 47 yards, 4:49.**
- SDG – John Carney 25-yard field goal, 1:55. Colts 11–6. **Drive: 8 plays, 47 yards, 2:54.**

**Third quarter**

- No scoring plays.

**Fourth quarter**

- IND – Mike Vanderjagt 51-yard field goal, 6:14. Colts 14–6. **Drive: 4 plays, 3 yards, 1:35.**
- SDG – Natrone Means 1-yard run (pass failed), 1:48. Colts 14–12. **Drive: 8 plays, 80 yards, 4:26.**
- IND – Mike Vanderjagt 40-yard field goal, 1:14. Colts 17–12. **Drive: 4 plays, 3 yards, 0:34.**

**Top passers**

- SDG – Ryan Leaf – 12/23, 160 yards, INT
- IND – Peyton Manning – 12/23, 137 yards, TD, INT

**Top rushers**

- SDG – Natrone Means – 31 rushes, 130 yards, TD
- IND – Marshall Faulk – 25 rushes, 50 yards

**Top receivers**

- SDG – Charlie Jones – 2 receptions, 66 yards
- IND – Marshall Faulk – 4 receptions, 44 yards, TD

This game featured the first two picks in the 1998 NFL draft. Ryan Leaf had previously outplayed Peyton Manning in a preseason game, but this was their first and only competitive meeting.

Manning had the better start, hitting Marshall Faulk for the opening score after Leaf had been intercepted; a trick play on the conversion made it 8–0 to the Colts. The defenses took over from there, with two field goals each the only scores until the final few minutes. Then Leaf found Charlie Jones for a 56-yard completion down to the one, and Means ran it in on the next play. However, Leaf's two-point conversion pass fell incomplete, leaving the score at 14–12. Indianapolis recovered an onside kick attempt and added a field goal, before stopping San Diego on downs with 33 seconds remaining.

The win was Peyton Manning's first in the NFL. The two quarterbacks had nearly identical stat lines, each completing 12 of 23 passes while throwing one interception. Leaf had a small yardage advantage (160 to 137), while Manning had the game's lone touchdown pass. Means rushed for 130 yards on 31 carries.

==== Week 6: at Oakland Raiders ====
Week Six: San Diego Chargers at Oakland Raiders – Game summary

Quarter	1	2	3	4	Total
Chargers	0	3	0	3	**6**
**Raiders**	0	0	0	7	**7**

at Network Associates Coliseum, Oakland, California

- Date: October 11
- Game time: 4:15 p.m. PDT
- Game weather: 61 °F (16.1 °C), relative humidity 60%, wind 7 mph
- Game attendance: 42,467
- Referee: Bernie Kukar
- TV announcers (CBS): Ian Eagle and Mark May
- Box score

Game information

**First quarter**

- No scoring plays.

**Second quarter**

- SDG – John Carney 39-yard field goal, 10:08. Chargers 3–0. **Drive: 4 plays, -1 yards, 1:46.**

**Third quarter**

- No scoring plays.

**Fourth quarter**

- SDG – John Carney 48-yard field goal, 3:09. Chargers 6–0. **Drive: 13 plays, 57 yards, 8:29.**
- OAK – James Jett 68-yard pass from Wade Wilson (Greg Davis kick), 1:28. Raiders 7–6. **Drive: 3 plays, 68 yards, 0:25.**

**Top passers**

- SDG – Ryan Leaf – 7/18, 78 yards, 3 INT
- OAK – Donald Hollas – 12/35, 101 yards, INT

**Top rushers**

- SDG – Natrone Means – 37 rushes, 101 yards
- OAK – Napoleon Kaufman – 12 rushes, 17 yards

**Top receivers**

- SDG – Natrone Means – 6 receptions, 66 yards
- OAK – James Jett – 1 reception, 68 yards, TD

A late lapse cost the Chargers victory in a game of uncommon defensive dominance. The Raiders' Leo Araguz set an NFL record by punting 16 times in the game, with 14 of these coming after going three-and-out. Starting QB Donald Hollis completed only 12 passes out of 35 for 101 yards and an interception, while their rushing attack was limited to 18 yards on 18 carries.

San Diego's offense fared little better. They opened the scoring with a John Carney field goal, but that came after a 56-yard punt return by Latario Rachal set them up at the Raiders' 20. Ryan Leaf completed 7 of 18 passes for 78 yards, with three passes picked off. After the last of these, he was pulled in favour of Craig Whelihan, who threw a further interception on his second passing attempt. On their next possession, the Chargers quit attempting to pass entirely, calling nothing but runs on a 13 play, 68-yard drive that took up most of the 4th quarter, and led to Carney's second field goal.

Following an exchange of punts, the Raiders took over on their own 32, where they faced a 3rd and 10 with 1:38 remaining. Backup QB Wade Wilson, who had missed on his first six passes, then found James Jett behind the defense for the winning touchdown. San Diego tried to respond, but on a 4th and 6 from the Raiders' 38, Means was stopped inches short of a first down and Oakland ran out the clock.

Means was again the lone highlight on offense for the Chargers, gaining 101 yards on 37 carries, while his 167 combined yards rushing and receiving accounted for over 85% of the Chargers 195 yards of total offense. For the Raiders, over 42% of their 159 yards came on the winning play.

Head coach Kevin Gilbride was fired three days after the game. Quarterbacks coach June Jones took his place for the remainder of the campaign.

The NFL released highlights of the game, titled "The UGLIEST Win EVER!"

==== Week 7: vs. Philadelphia Eagles ====
Week Seven: Philadelphia Eagles at San Diego Chargers – Game summary

Quarter	1	2	3	4	Total
Eagles	0	3	0	7	**10**
**Chargers**	3	0	7	3	**13**

at Qualcomm Stadium, San Diego, California

- Date: October 18
- Game time: 4:15 p.m. PDT
- Game weather: 66 °F (18.9 °C), relative humidity 38%, wind 8 mph
- Game attendance: 64,037
- Referee: Bob McElwee
- TV announcers (FOX): Tim Ryan, Bill Maas and Ronnie Lott
- Box score

Game information

**First quarter**

- SDG – John Carney 23-yard field goal, 10:36. Chargers 3–0. **Drive: 9 plays, 64 yards, 4:24.**

**Second quarter**

- PHI – Chris Boniol 35-yard field goal, 8:41. Tied 3–3. **Drive: 18 plays, 62 yards, 7:20.**

**Third quarter**

- SDG – Natrone Means 14-yard run (John Carney kick), 6:16. Chargers 10–3. **Drive: 8 plays, 54 yards, 5:11.**

**Fourth quarter**

- PHI – Charlie Garner 12-yard run (Chris Boniol kick), 11:32. Tied 10–10. **Drive: 6 plays, 51 yards, 3:00.**
- SDG – John Carney 26-yard field goal, 7:18. Chargers 13–10. **Drive: 4 plays, 9 yards, 1:52.**

**Top passers**

- PHI – Rodney Peete – 22/39, 232 yards, 2 INT
- SDG – Ryan Leaf – 9/19, 83 yards

**Top rushers**

- PHI – Duce Staley – 14 rushes, 41 yards
- SDG – Natrone Means – 21 rushes, 112 yards, TD

**Top receivers**

- PHI – Russell Copeland – 6 receptions, 69 yards
- SDG – Bryan Still – 3 receptions, 28 yards

In a familiar story, it was Natrone Means (112 yards) and the defense who led San Diego as they broke their four-game losing streak. Means rushed four times for 32 yards on the game's opening possession, leading to a field goal; on the first Charger drive of the second half, he carried four times for 43 yards and a touchdown. Leaf passed for only 83 yards, and lost 55 yards in sacks, but threw no interceptions, and San Diego won the turnover battle for the first time all season (4–1). Norman Hand intercepted a tipped pass to set up the game-winning field goal, and Junior Seau ended the final Eagles threat when he recovered a fumble caused by Charles Dimry.

==== Week 8: vs. Seattle Seahawks ====
Week Eight: Seattle Seahawks at San Diego Chargers – Game summary

Quarter	1	2	3	4	Total
**Seahawks**	7	10	3	7	**27**
Chargers	0	10	7	3	**20**

at Qualcomm Stadium, San Diego, California

- Date: October 25
- Game time: 4:15 p.m. PST
- Game weather: 65 °F (18.3 °C), relative humidity 80%, wind 8 mph
- Game attendance: 58,512
- Referee: Larry Nemmers
- TV announcers (CBS): Ian Eagle and Mark May
- Box score

Game information

**First quarter**

- SEA – Joey Galloway 81-yard pass from John Friesz (Todd Peterson kick), 8:46. Seahawks 7–0. **Drive: 3 plays, 88 yards, 1:23.**

**Second quarter**

- SDG – John Carney 21-yard field goal, 10:46. Seahawks 7–3. **Drive: 11 plays, 60 yards, 5:42.**
- SEA – Todd Peterson 40-yard field goal, 8:51. Seahawks 10–3. **Drive: 4 plays, -1 yards, 1:55.**
- SEA – Joey Galloway 74-yard punt return (Todd Peterson kick), 7:26. Seahawks 17–3.
- SDG – Mikhael Ricks 5-yard pass from Ryan Leaf (John Carney kick), 0:33. Seahawks 17–10. **Drive: 12 plays, 63 yards, 6:53.**

**Third quarter**

- SDG – Natrone Means 1-yard run (John Carney kick), 5:35. Tied 17–17. **Drive: 5 plays, 52 yards, 2:47.**
- SEA – Todd Peterson 23-yard field goal, 0:54. Seahwaks 20–17. **Drive: 10 plays, 47 yards, 4:41.**

**Fourth quarter**

- SEA – Ricky Watters 1-yard run (Todd Peterson kick), 8:43. Seahawks 27–17. **Drive: 9 plays, 81 yards, 5:25.**
- SDG – John Carney 45–yard field goal, 4:16. Seahawks 27–20. **Drive: 13 plays, 54 yards, 4:27.**

**Top passers**

- SEA – John Friesz – 14/21, 234 yards, TD
- SDG – Ryan Leaf – 25/52, 281 yards, TD

**Top rushers**

- SEA – Ricky Watters – 18 rushes, 32 yards, TD
- SDG – Natrone Means – 27 rushes, 92 yards, TD

**Top receivers**

- SEA – Joey Galloway – 4 receptions, 130 yards, TD
- SDG – Charlie Jones – 6 receptions, 85 yards

A much-improved offensive showing was not enough to prevent the Chargers from slipping to 3–5 heading into their bye. The Chargers gained a season-high 391 yards, and committed no turnovers for the second and final time all year. The Seahawks, however, took a 17–3 lead on the strength of two long touchdowns from Joey Galloway – an 81-yard reception and a 74-yard punt return. The Chargers responded, Mikhael Ricks catching a 5-yard scoring pass from Leaf (his first touchdown throw since the opener), and Means tying the score midway through the third quarter.

Seattle rebuilt their lead, and the Chargers trailed by 7 going into their final possession, starting on their own 20 with 2:43 to play. Leaf led the team all the way down to the Seahawks' 3-yard line, converting a 4th and 6 en route, but then threw three incompletions as time expired.

==== Week 10: at Denver Broncos ====
Week Ten: San Diego Chargers at Denver Broncos – Game summary

Quarter	1	2	3	4	Total
Chargers	0	0	0	10	**10**
**Broncos**	7	13	7	0	**27**

at Mile High Stadium, Denver, Colorado

- Date: November 8
- Game time: 2:15 p.m. MST
- Game weather: 31 °F (−0.6 °C), relative humidity 86%, wind 9 mph, wind chill 23
- Game attendance: 74,925
- Referee: Tom White
- TV announcers (CBS): Kevin Harlan and Sam Wyche
- Box score

Game information

**First quarter**

- DEN – Terrell Davis 4-yard pass from Bubby Brister (Jason Elam kick), 1:04. Broncos 7–0. **Drive: 5 plays, 25 yards, 1:59.**

**Second quarter**

- DEN – Jason Elam 31-yard field goal, 8:51. Broncos 10–0. **Drive: 10 plays, 55 yards, 4:35.**
- DEN – Terrell Davis 24-yard run (Jason Elam kick), 2:49. Broncos 17–0. **Drive: 8 plays, 61 yards, 4:46.**
- DEN – Jason Elam 26-yard field goal, 0:04. Broncos 20–0. **Drive: 6 plays, 42 yards, 2:08.**

**Third quarter**

- DEN – Ed McCaffrey 7-yard pass from Bubby Brister (Jason Elam kick). Broncos 27–0. **Drive: 1 play, 7 yards, 0:07.**

**Fourth quarter**

- SDG – Freddie Jones 14-yard pass from Craig Whelihan (Craig Whelihan run), 8:50. Broncos 27–8. **Drive: 14 plays, 92 yards, 7:46.**
- SDG – Safety, Bubby Brister fumbled ball out of end zone, 2:23. Broncos 27–10.

**Top passers**

- SDG – Craig Whelihan – 13/23, 113 yards, TD
- DEN – Bubby Brister – 20/33, 229 yards, 2 TD, INT

**Top rushers**

- SDG – Natrone Means – 19 rushes, 78 yards
- DEN – Terrell Davis – 20 rushes, 69 yards, TD

**Top receivers**

- SDG – Bryan Still – 2 receptions, 37 yards
- DEN – Ed McCaffrey – 9 receptions, 133 yards, TD

Even with Bubby Brister filling in for the injured John Elway for much of the game, the unbeaten Broncos cruised to the win. San Diego could muster only two first downs through their first eight drives, which ended with seven punts and an interception thrown to ex-Charger Darrien Gordon by Leaf, who was then benched; his figures were 4 completions from 15 attempts, for just 26 yards. With the Broncos out of reach up 27–0, Craig Whelihan came in and had some success moving the offense, leading a 92-yard drive capped by a touchdown pass to Freddie Jones. Interim head coach June Jones named Whelihan the new starting QB after the game, a position he would remain in for the rest of the season.

==== Week 11: vs. Baltimore Ravens ====
Week Eleven: Baltimore Ravens at San Diego Chargers – Game summary

Quarter	1	2	3	4	Total
Ravens	0	3	7	3	**13**
**Chargers**	0	7	0	7	**14**

at Qualcomm Stadium, San Diego, California

- Date: November 5
- Game time: 1:05 p.m. PST
- Game weather: 59 °F (15.0 °C), relative humidity 74%, wind 6 mph
- Game attendance: 54,388
- Referee: Gerry Austin
- TV announcers (CBS): Gus Johnson and Steve Tasker
- Box score

Game information

**First quarter**

- No scoring plays.

**Second quarter**

- BAL – Matt Stover 42-yard field goal, 13:27. Ravens 3–0. **Drive: 7 plays, 23 yards, 4:17.**
- SDG – Charlie Jones 47-yard pass from Craig Whelihan (John Carney kick), 3:04. Chargers 7–3. **Drive: 1 play, 47 yards, 0:07.**

**Third quarter**

- BAL – Jermaine Lewis 58-yard pass from Jim Harbaugh (Matt Stover kick), 7:25. Ravens 10–7. **Drive: 1 play, 58 yards, 0:08.**

**Fourth quarter**

- SDG – Terrell Fletcher 3-yard run (John Carney kick), 14:41. Chargers 14–10. **Drive: 16 plays, 69 yards, 7:44.**
- BAL – Matt Stover 42-yard field goal, 3:49. Chargers 14–13. **Drive: 7 plays, 20 yards, 2:11.**

**Top passers**

- BAL – Jim Harbaugh – 12/33, 150 yards, TD, INT
- SDG – Craig Whelihan – 15/42, 172 yards, TD

**Top rushers**

- BAL – Jim Harbaugh – 5 rushes, 22 yards
- SDG – Terrell Fletcher – 23 rushes, 47 yards, TD

**Top receivers**

- BAL – Jermaine Lewis – 2 receptions, 78 yards, TD
- SDG – Charlie Jones – 2 receptions, 65 yards, TD

Whelihan won his first start of the season, though it was again the defense who deserved most of the credit, holding the Ravens to 161 total yards and eight first downs all game. Natrone Means sustained a season-ending foot injury, and Whelihan completed only 15 passes from 42 attempts, though he did manage a 47-yard touchdown to Charlie Jones. Ravens' errors played a part in the second Charger touchdown, as they twice prolonged the drive with penalties for leverage on field goal attempts. Terrell Fletcher finished the drive with a 3-yard touchdown run.

A controversial play occurred with six minutes left in the game, when Jermaine Lewis fell while hurdling a trip from punter Darren Bennett, got back to his feet and completed what appeared to be a 90-yard touchdown return. However, officials ruled that Bennett had made contact with his leg, and that Lewis was down at the Baltimore 45. The Ravens would settle for a field goal on that drive, and were stopped on downs inside their own 20 on their lone possession afterwards.

==== Week 12: at Kansas City Chiefs ====
Week Twelve: Kansas City Chiefs at San Diego Chargers – Game summary

Quarter	1	2	3	4	Total
Chiefs	7	7	13	10	**37**
**Chargers**	7	10	0	21	**38**

at Qualcomm Stadium, San Diego, California

- Date: November 22
- Game time: 1:15 p.m. PST
- Game weather: 59 °F (15.0 °C), relative humidity 60%, wind 6 mph
- Game attendance: 59,894
- Referee: Tony Corrente
- TV announcers (CBS): Don Criqui and Beasley Reece
- Box score

Game information

**First quarter**

- SDG – Terrell Fletcher 4-yard run (John Carney kick), 9:33. Chargers 7–0. **Drive: 8 plays, 61 yards, 3:18.**
- KAN – Derrick Alexander 35-yard pass from Rich Gannon (Pete Stoyanovich kick), 7:05. Tied 7–7. **Drive: 5 plays, 80 yards, 2:28.**

**Second quarter**

- SDG – Tremayne Stephens 2-yard run (John Carney kick), 13:21. Chargers 14–7. **Drive: 14 plays, 76 yards, 8:44.**
- SDG – John Carney 31-yard field goal, 9:07. Chargers 17–7. **Drive: 5 plays, 21 yards, 2:55.**
- KAN – Bam Morris 2-yard run (Pete Stoyanovich kick), 6:15. Chargers 17–14. **Drive: 7 plays, 63 yards, 2:52.**

**Third quarter**

- KAN – Bam Morris 1-yard run (Pete Stoyanovich kick), 14:26. Chiefs 21–17. **Drive: 1 play, 42 yards, 0:11.**
- KAN – Pete Stoyanovich 27-yard field goal, 3:31. Chiefs 24–17. **Drive: 7 plays, 23 yards, 3:59.**
- KAN – Pete Stoyanovich 42-yard field goal, 0:53. Chiefs 27–17. **Drive: 4 plays, 9 yards, 1:29.**

**Fourth quarter**

- KAN – Bam Morris 3-yard run (Pete Stoyanovich kick), 11:46. Chiefs 34–17. **Drive: 6 plays, 53 yards, 2:56.**
- SDG – Terrell Fletcher 4-yard run (John Carney kick), 8:01. Chiefs 34–24. **Drive: 7 plays, 91 yards, 3:45.**
- KAN – Pete Stoyanovich 50-yard field goal, 5:28. Chiefs 37–24. **Drive: 6 plays, 53 yards, 2:33.**
- SDG – Freddie Jones 25-yard pass from Craig Whelihan (John Carney kick), 4:14. Chiefs 37–31. **Drive: 5 plays, 77 yards, 1:14.**
- SDG – Charlie Jones 1-yard pass from Craig Whelihan (John Carney kick), 0:09. Chargers 38–37. **Drive: 7 plays, 63 yards, 0:42.**

**Top passers**

- KAN – Rich Gannon – 20/33, 304 yards, TD, INT
- SDG – Craig Whelihan – 19/37, 279 yards, 2 TD, INT

**Top rushers**

- KAN – Bam Morris – 23 rushes 39 yards, 3 TD
- SDG – Terrell Fletcher – 16 rushes, 52 yards, 2 TD

**Top receivers**

- KAN – Derrick Alexander – 5 receptions, 173 yards, TD
- SDG – Freddie Jones – 5 receptions, 78 yards, TD

An improbable 4th quarter recovery saw the Chargers improve their record to 5–6. San Diego began brightly, a pair of rushing touchdowns by Terrell Fletcher and Tremayne Stephens putting them up 17–7 in the 2nd quarter. However, their offense then fell dormant for most of the game. Whelihan committed a pair of turnovers, and Bam Morris scored three times as the Chiefs ran off 27 unanswered points, going up 34–17 early in the 4th quarter. A second Fletcher touchdown run drew the Chargers within 10 points and, following a Pete Stoyanovich field goal, Whelihan hit Freddie Jones for a 25-yard touchdown on 4th and 13. The Chiefs responded by once again moving into field goal range, but Stoyanovich, who had missed a crucial playoff attempt in the same stadium four years earlier, saw his kick drift to the left with 51 seconds left. On the ensuing drive, James Hasty was twice flagged for pass interference, the second time on 4th and 10, and Whelihan found Charlie Jones for the game-winner from a yard out with 9 seconds left.

The offensive explosion was anomalous for the '98 Chargers. In no other game did they score more than 20 points, or more than two touchdowns.

==== Week 13: vs. Denver Broncos ====
Week Thirteen: Denver Broncos at San Diego Chargers – Game summary

Quarter	1	2	3	4	Total
**Broncos**	14	7	7	3	**31**
Chargers	10	0	0	6	**16**

at Qualcomm Stadium, San Diego, California

- Date: November 29
- Game time: 5:20 p.m. PST
- Game weather: 58 °F (14.4 °C), relative humidity 70%, wind 14 mph
- Game attendance: 66,532
- Referee: Jerry Markbreit
- TV announcers (ESPN): Mike Patrick, Joe Theismann and Paul Maguire
- Box score

Game information

**First quarter**

- SDG – John Carney 27-yard field goal, 13:12. Chargers 3–0. **Drive: 5 plays, 16 yards, 1:33.**
- DEN – Ed McCaffrey 15-yard pass from John Elway (Jason Elam kick), 10:38. Broncos 7–3. **Drive: 3 plays, 22 yards, 0:36.**
- DEN – Ed McCaffrey 37-yard pass from John Elway (Jason Elam kick), 6:43. Broncos 14–3. **Drive: 5 plays, 66 yards, 2:14.**
- SDG – Terrell Fletcher 13-yard run (John Carney kick), 1:32. Broncos 14–10. **Drive: 9 plays, 81 yards, 5:11.**

**Second quarter**

- DEN – Rod Smith 13-yard pass from John Elway (Jason Elam kick), 0:43. Broncos 21–10. **Drive: 2 plays, 19 yards, 0:22.**

**Third quarter**

- DEN – Shannon Sharpe 18-yard pass from John Elway (Jason Elam kick), 4:34. Broncos 28–10. **Drive: 14 plays, 95 yards, 8:20.**

**Fourth quarter**

- DEN – Jason Elam 34-yard field goal, 14:46. Broncos 31–10. **Drive: 9 plays, 29 yards, 4:14.**
- SDG – Bryan Still 47-yard pass from Craig Whelihan (pass failed), 4:55. Broncos 31–16. **Drive: 3 plays, 60 yards, 0:57.**

**Top passers**

- DEN – John Elway – 19/34, 239 yards, 4 TD, 3 INT
- SDG – Craig Whelihan – 30/53, 304 yards, TD, 5 INT

**Top rushers**

- DEN – Terrell Davis – 24 rushes, 74 yards
- SDG – Terrell Fletcher – 11 rushes, 54 yards, TD

**Top receivers**

- DEN – Rod Smith – 8 receptions, 101 yards, TD
- SDG – Bryan Still – 5 receptions, 99 yards, TD

San Diego stayed with the 11–0 Broncos longer than expected, before falling away in the second half. In a scrappy game, where San Diego lost the turnover battle 6–4, a 13-yard Terrell Fletcher run drew the Chargers within four points late in the 1st quarter. On their next possession, San Diego reached a 2nd and 3 at the Denver 7, but Kenny Bynum fumbled away the opportunity. Despite managing to intercept John Elway on the next three Denver possessions (he only threw 10 picks all season), the Chargers didn't get that close to scoring again until the 4th quarter, when a 47-yard touchdown reception by Bryan Still was little more than a consolation. Whelihan passed for 300+ yards for the only time in his career, but was victimised by five interceptions, two of them thrown to Darrien Gordon.

==== Week 14: at Washington Redskins ====
Week Fourteen: San Diego Chargers at Washington Redskins – Game summary

Quarter	1	2	3	4	Total
Chargers	3	11	3	3	**20**
**Redskins**	7	10	0	7	**24**

at Jack Kent Cooke Stadium, Washington, DC

- Date: December 6
- Game time: 1:00 p.m. EST
- Game weather: 62 °F (16.7 °C), relative humidity 76%, wind 9 mph
- Game attendance: 65,713
- Referee: Ron Winter
- TV announcers (CBS): Bill Macatee and John Dockery
- Box score

Game information

**First quarter**

- SDG – John Carney 32-yard field goal, 6:20. Chargers 3–0. **Drive: 13 plays, 67 yards, 6:19.**
- WAS – James Thrash 25-yard pass from Trent Green (Cary Blanchard kick), 0:49. Redskins 7–3. **Drive: 10 plays, 82 yards, 5:31.**

**Second quarter**

- SDG – John Carney 27-yard field goal, 10:42. Redskins 7–6. **Drive: 11 plays, 68 yards, 5:07.**
- WAS – Brian Mitchell 101-yard kickoff return (Cary Blanchard kick), 10:24. Redskins 14–6.
- SDG – Freddie Jones 23-yard pass from Terrell Fletcher (Freddie Jones pass from Craig Whelihan), 5:01. Tied 14–14. **Drive: 8 plays, 66 yards, 5:23.**
- WAS – Cary Blanchard 35-yard field goal, 0:06. Redskins 17–14. **Drive: 8 plays, 35 yards, 0:50.**

**Third quarter**

- SDG – John Carney 40-yard field goal, 10:21. Tied 17–17. **Drive: 9 plays, 52 yards, 4:39.**

**Fourth quarter**

- SDG – John Carney 25-yard field goal, 4:31. Chargers 20–17. **Drive: 6 plays, 53 yards, 2:29.**
- WAS – Leslie Shepherd 20-yard pass from Trent Green (Cary Blanchard kick), 1:54. Redskins 24–20. **Drive: 3 plays, 44 yards, 0:40.**

**Top passers**

- SDG – Craig Whelihan – 20/37, 212 yards, INT
- WAS – Trent Green – 18/37, 235 yards, 2 TD, INT

**Top rushers**

- SDG – Terrell Fletcher – 34 rushes, 122 yards
- WAS – Terry Allen – 9 rushes, 28 yards

**Top receivers**

- SDG – Mikhael Ricks – 4 receptions, 76 yards
- WAS – James Thrash – 4 receptions, 66 yards, TD

San Diego's lone touchdown came as a result of trickery, Terrell Fletcher passing to Freddie Jones on an HB option; Jones also caught a two-point conversion from Whelihan to tie the game at 14–14. Beyond that, they relied on the kicking of John Carney, who made four field goals from five attempts, the last of which put the Chargers up 20–17 in the final quarter. However, Trent Green threw a 20-yard touchdown to Leslie Shepherd with 1:48 to play, which stood up as the winning score after a Whelihan pass went through the hands of Freddie Jones and was intercepted.

==== Week 15: at Seattle Seahawks ====
Week Fifteen: San Diego Chargers at Seattle Seahawks – Game summary

Quarter	1	2	3	4	Total
Chargers	7	7	0	3	**17**
**Seahawks**	14	7	7	10	**38**

at Kingdome, Seattle, Washington

- Date: December 13
- Game time: 1:05 p.m. PST
- Game weather: Dome
- Game attendance: 62,690
- Referee: Walt Coleman
- TV announcers (CBS): Kevin Harlan and Sam Wyche
- Box score

Game information

**First quarter**

- SEA – Jon Kitna 2-yard run (Todd Peterson kick), 12:31. Seahawks 7–0. **Drive: 9 plays, 43 yards, 2:29.**
- SDG – Jamal Williams 14-yard interception return (John Carney kick), 6:07. Tied 7–7.
- SEA – Terry McDaniel 43-yard interception return (Todd Peterson kick), 2:22. Seahawks 14–7.

**Second quarter**

- SEA – Ricky Watters 1-yard run (Todd Peterson kick), 3:42. Seahawks 21–7. **Drive: 7 plays, 27 yards, 3:55.**
- SDG – Terrell Fletcher 1-yard run (John Carney kick), 0:19. Seahawks 21–14. **Drive: 8 plays, 47 yards, 1:01.**

**Third quarter**

- SEA – Joey Galloway 9-yard pass from Jon Kitna (Todd Peterson kick), 6:01. Seahawks 28–14. **Drive: 3 plays, 13 yards, 1:25.**

**Fourth quarter**

- SDG – John Carney 21-yard field goal, 14:53. Seahawks 28–17. **Drive: 12 plays, 57 yards, 6:08.**
- SEA – Cortez Kennedy 39-yard fumble return (Todd Peterson kick), 13:15. Seahawks 35–17.
- SEA – Todd Peterson 29-yard field goal, 8:16. Seahawks 38–17. **Drive: 8 plays, 26 yards, 3:45.**

**Top passers**

- SDG – Craig Whelihan – 8/28, 142 yards, 5 INT
- SEA – Jon Kitna – 16/31, 140 yards, TD, 3 INT

**Top rushers**

- SDG – Terrell Fletcher – 17 rushes, 42 yards, TD
- SEA – Ricky Watters – 21 rushes, 69 yards, TD

**Top receivers**

- SDG – Charlie Jones – 5 receptions, 78 yards
- SEA – Joey Galloway – 7 receptions, 69 yards, TD

The Chargers were officially eliminated from playoff contention amidst a blizzard of turnovers. San Diego's defense made the first big play, Jamal Williams running an interception back 14 yards for a game-tying score. However, Whelihan threw interceptions on the next three drives, the first of which was run back for a touchdown, the third of which set the Seahawks up for a short scoring drive and a 21–7 lead. Terrell Fletcher's run halved the deficit shortly before halftime.

The errors continued in the second half. Whelihan threw another pick, and was benched for Ryan Leaf; Leaf's first pass was intercepted. Later, Leaf was sacked on consecutive plays, the second of these causing a fumble that Cortez Kennedy ran back for a touchdown. Whelihan came back in for the next series and was intercepted for the fifth time, then Leaf returned and threw his second pick. With Jon Kitna of the Seahawks also throwing three interceptions, the game saw ten in total, the most for 27 years, with the seven by the Chargers being the most by one team for 12 years.

==== Week 16: vs. Oakland Raiders ====
Week Sixteen: Oakland Raiders at San Diego Chargers – Game summary

Quarter	1	2	3	4	Total
**Raiders**	0	14	3	0	**17**
Chargers	3	0	7	0	**10**

at Qualcomm Stadium, San Diego, California

- Date: December 20
- Game time: 1:05 p.m. PST
- Game weather: 55 °F (12.8 °C), relative humidity 73%, wind 12 mph
- Game attendance: 60,716
- Referee: Larry Nemmers
- TV announcers (CBS): Gus Johnson and Steve Tasker
- Box score

Game information

**First quarter**

- SDG – John Carney 28-yard field goal, 0:50. Chargers 3–0.**Drive: 10 plays, 47 yards, 4:41.**

**Second quarter**

- OAK – James Jett 45-yard pass from Wade Wilson (Greg Davis kick), 12:19. Raiders 7–3. **Drive: 6 plays, 80 yards, 3:31.**
- OAK – Tim Brown 12-yard pass from Wade Wilson (Greg Davis kick), 6:10. Raiders 14–3. **Drive: 8 plays, 57 yards, 4:24.**

**Third quarter**

- OAK – Greg Davis 25-yard field goal, 10:26. Raiders 17–3. **Drive: 4 plays, 4 yards, 0:57.**
- SDG – Mikhael Ricks 39-yard pass from Craig Whelihan (John Carney kick), 0:04. Raiders 17–10. **Drive: 5 plays, 74 yards, 2:13.**

**Fourth quarter**

- No scoring plays.

**Top passers**

- OAK – Wade Wilson – 14/25, 167 yards, 2 TD, 2 INT
- SDG – Craig Whelihan – 19/39, 251 yards, TD, 2 INT

**Top rushers**

- OAK – Randy Jordan – 24 rushes, 82 yards
- SDG – Terrell Fletcher – 15 rushes, 65 yards

**Top receivers**

- OAK – James Jett – 5 receptions, 106 yards, TD
- SDG – Mikhael Ricks – 4 receptions, 72 yards, TD

This game featured considerably more offensive output than the teams' previous meeting, with the Raiders putting together back to back touchdown drives of 80 and 57 yards, en route to a 17–3 3rd-quarter lead. Whelihan threw a 39-yard touchdown pass to Mikhael Ricks, but the Chargers missed numerous scoring chances, three times turning the ball over on downs in Raider territory, and once via an interception.

==== Week 17: at Arizona Cardinals ====
Week Seventeen: San Diego Chargers at Arizona Cardinals – Game summary

Quarter	1	2	3	4	Total
Chargers	0	3	0	10	**13**
**Cardinals**	7	3	3	3	**16**

at Sun Devil Stadium, Tempe, Arizona

- Date: September 6
- Game time: 4:15 p.m. MST
- Game weather: 53 °F (11.7 °C), relative humidity 39%, wind 5 mph
- Game attendance: 71,670
- Referee: Bob McElwee
- TV announcers (CBS): Don Criqui and Beasley Reece
- Box score

Game information

**First quarter**

- ARI – Adrian Murrell 4-yard run (Chris Jacke kick), 5:12. Cardinals 7–0. **Drive: 9 plays, 86 yards, 3:05.**

**Second quarter**

- ARI – Chris Jacke 37-yard field goal, 12:32. Cardinals 10–0. **Drive: 11 plays, 51 yards, 4:55.**
- SDG – John Carney 31-yard field goal, 3:15. Cardinals 10–3. **Drive: 11 plays, 49 yards, 5:29.**

**Third quarter**

- ARI – Chris Jacke 36-yard field goal, 2:57. Cardinals 13–3. **Drive: 6 plays, 9 yards, 1:48.**

**Fourth quarter**

- SDG – John Carney 26-yard field goal, 9:56. Cardinals 13–6. **Drive: 17 plays, 71 yards, 8:11.**
- SDG – Ryan Thelwell 30-yard pass from Craig Whelihan (John Carney kick), 0:16. Tied 13–13. **Drive: 10 plays, 68 yards, 1:39.**
- ARI – Chris Jacke 52-yard field goal, 0:00. Cardinals 16–13. **Drive: 2 plays, 10 yards, 0:16.**

**Top passers**

- SDG – Craig Whelihan – 16/40, 214 yards, TD, 4 INT
- ARI – Jake Plummer – 20/41, 274 yards

**Top rushers**

- SDG – Terrell Fletcher – 23 rushes, 127 yards
- ARI – Adrian Murrell 18 rushes, 25 yards, TD

**Top receivers**

- SDG – Ryan Thelwell – 5 receptions, 84 yards, TD
- ARI – Frank Sanders – 8 receptions, 106 yards

The Chargers ended the season on a five-game losing streak, beaten by a team with far more to play for. A 4-yard run by Adrian Murrell put Arizona ahead, and a record-tying four interceptions by Kwamie Lassiter kept them ahead 13–6 at the two-minute warning. However, a missed 42-yard field goal by Chris Jacke set up a dramatic finish. Whelihan converted a 4th and 3, before San Diego faced a 4th and 20 from the Arizona 30; Whelihan then connected with Ryan Thelwell to tie the score with just 16 seconds left. That proved to be long enough for the Cardinals, as former Charger Eric Metcalf ran the ensuing kickoff back to the Charger 44-yard line; after a quick completion moved them closer, Jacke made amends with a 52-yard kick to send his team into the playoffs.

== Standings ==
AFC West
	W	L	T	PCT	PF	PA	STK
^{(1)} Denver Broncos	14	2	0	.875	501	309	W1
Oakland Raiders	8	8	0	.500	288	356	L1
Seattle Seahawks	8	8	0	.500	372	310	L1
Kansas City Chiefs	7	9	0	.438	327	363	W1
San Diego Chargers	5	11	0	.313	241	342	L5

== Awards ==
Seau and Harrison (as a kick returner) were the only Chargers in the AFC Pro Bowl squad, both named as starters; they were also both named first-team All-Pros by the Associated Press. Seau received 1 of the 47 available votes for AP NFL Defensive Player of the Year.

== See also ==
- List of NFL teams affected by internal conflict
