= Craig Whelihan =

American football player (born 1971)

No. 5, 4, 12
- Position: Quarterback

Personal information
- Born: April 15, 1971 (age 55); San Jose, California, U.S.
- Listed height: 6 ft 5 in (1.96 m)
- Listed weight: 220 lb (100 kg)

Career information
- High school: Santa Teresa (San Jose)
- College: Pacific
- NFL draft: 1995: 6th round, 197th overall pick

Career history
- San Diego Chargers (1995–1998); Oakland Raiders (2000)*; Memphis Maniax (2001); Chicago Enforcers (2001); Orlando Predators (2001–2002); Indiana Firebirds (2003); Orlando Predators (2004); Las Vegas Gladiators (2005–2006); San Jose SaberCats (2007)
- * Offseason or practice squad member only

Awards and highlights
- ArenaBowl champion (2007)

Career NFL statistics
- Passing attempts: 557
- Passing completions: 267
- Completion percentage: 47.9%
- TD–INT: 14–29
- Passing yards: 3,160
- Passer rating: 52.4
- Stats at Pro Football Reference

Career AFL statistics
- Comp. / Att.: 474 / 803
- Passing yards: 5,978
- TD-INT: 110–28
- Passer rating: 102.01
- Rushing TD: 11
- Stats at ArenaFan.com

Craig Dominic Whelihan (born April 15, 1971) is an American former professional football player who was a quarterback in the National Football League (NFL), XFL, and Arena Football League (AFL). He played college football for the Pacific Tigers. He was selected by the San Diego Chargers in the sixth round of the 1995 NFL draft. He is currently a coach at Torrey Pines High School.

== Early life and education ==
Born in San Jose, California, Whelilhan graduated from Santa Teresa High School of San Jose in 1989 and lettered in football, baseball and basketball. In football, as a senior, he passed for 1,314 yards and 11 touchdowns.

After graduating from Santa Teresa High, Whelihan enrolled at Oregon State University and redshirted his freshman year. In 1990, Whelihan transferred to the University of the Pacific in Stockton, California and played on the Pacific Tigers football team from 1992 to 1994.

In 1993, Whelihan made his collegiate debut against Southwest Missouri State. In 1994, he made his first collegiate start against his former school Oregon State. In 1994, he was the Tigers starting quarterback for the first nine games of the season before breaking his thumb against Oregon State, which ended his season prematurely. He ended his college career ranked third on the school's list for completions (300), attempts (591) and TDs (27).

=== College statistics ===
Season	Team	Games			Passing								Rushing			
Season	Team	GP	GS	Record	Cmp	Att	Pct	Yds	Y/A	TD	Int	Rtg	Att	Yds	Avg	TD
1990	Oregon State	Redshirted (redshirt)														
1991	Pacific	Did not play due to NCAA transfer rules														
1992	Pacific	2	0	0–0	6	17	35.3	84	4.9	1	1	84.4	5	−1	−0.2	0
1993	Pacific	9	7	2–5	132	248	53.2	1,395	5.6	9	5	108.4	51	−62	−1.2	2
1994	Pacific	9	9	5–4	162	326	49.7	2,318	7.1	17	14	118.0	24	−12	−0.5	1
Career		20	16	7–9	300	591	50.8	3,797	6.4	27	20	113.0	80	-75	-3.8	3

== Playing career ==
=== 1995–1997 ===
The San Diego Chargers drafted Whelihan in the sixth round (197th overall) in the 1995 NFL draft. After not seeing any regular season action in 1995 or 1996, Whelihan made his NFL debut in Week 8 (October 16) of the 1997 season, in a 31–3 loss to the Kansas City Chiefs. Replacing Stan Humphries, Whelihan completed 2 of 8 passes for 13 yards. In his second game with San Diego, a 38–31 loss to the Cincinnati Bengals in Week 10 (November 2), Whelihan completed 8 of 16 passes for 90 yards and passed for his first NFL touchdown, a 44-yarder to Charlie Jones with 6 minutes left in the 4th quarter.

Whelihan replaced Humphries as the starter effective Week 10 (November 9) because Humphries suffered from concussion symptoms. In Whelihan's debut as starter, Whelihan completed 17 of 29 passes for 206 yards, 2 touchdowns, and an interception in a 37–31 loss to the Seattle Seahawks. Whelihan also lost a fumble in the Chargers' end zone, and Michael Sinclair recovered the fumble for a defensive touchdown. In the last play of the game, Sinclair sacked Whelihan to seal the Seahawks win.

Playing for only the first three quarters, Whelihan had a season-low 22.2% completion rate in Week 12 (November 23) against the San Francisco 49ers, completing 4 of 18 passes for 81 yards and 3 interceptions before Todd Philcox replaced him. San Diego finished 1997 with a 4–12 record, including 0–7 with Whelihan as starter. In 9 games (7 starts), Whelihan finished 1997 with 118 of 237 passes completed for 6 touchdowns and 10 interceptions, 21 sacks for 168 lost yards, and 29 rushing yards on 13 carries.

=== 1998–2000 ===
Whelihan again was the second-string quarterback in 1998, this time behind second-overall draft pick Ryan Leaf. After a Leaf pick-six put San Diego behind by 19, Whelihan replaced Leaf in the Week 4 (September 27) game against the New York Giants. In his first drive of the game, Whelihan made a 41-yard touchdown pass to Charlie Jones; the ensuing extra point cut New York's lead to 28–16. San Diego lost the game 34–16, and Whelihan finished with 6 of 15 completed passes for 97 yards and a touchdown as well as 13 rushing yards in 3 carries. In contrast, Leaf threw 4 interceptions in the game in 15-for-34 passing for 193 yards.

In Week 6 (October 11), a 7–6 loss to the Oakland Raiders, Whelihan again replaced Leaf late in the game. Leaf had thrown three interceptions, and Whelihan threw an interception in his first drive. Trailing 7–6 and on 4th-and-6 on Oakland's 38 with 42 seconds left, Whelihan completed a screen pass to Natrone Means, but Means fell six inches short of the first down. After Leaf completed only 4 of 15 passes with an interception in Week 10 (November 8), Whelihan replaced Leaf and had a better performance: 13 of 23 completed passes for 113 yards and a touchdown. San Diego lost 27–10 to defending champion and this season's eventual champion Denver Broncos. Effective Week 11 (November 15), Whelihan was starter permanently.

San Diego finished 1998 with a 5–11 record, just one game better than in 1997; Whelihan had a 2–5 record as the starter. Both of Whelihan's wins were by one point: 14–13 over Baltimore Ravens in Week 11 and 38–37 over Kansas City Chiefs in Week 12 (November 22). In Week 11, Whelihan completed 15 of 42 passes for 172 yards and a touchdown, and Whelihan improved in the next game with 19-for-37 passing for 279 yards, 2 touchdowns, and an interception.

A five-game losing streak followed those two wins. In the season finale on December 28 against the Arizona Cardinals, Arizona safety Kwamie Lassiter intercepted Whelihan four times; one of Lassiter's interceptions bounced off Chargers receiver Ryan Thelwell. With 16 seconds left on 4th-and-20, Thelwell caught a 30-yard touchdown pass from Whelihan, and the extra point tied the game at 13. However, Chris Jacke kicked the winning field goal as time expired, and Arizona's win qualified the team for the playoffs for the first time in nearly 15 years.

The Chargers cut Whelihan after the 1999 preseason. On January 6, 2000, Whelihan signed with the Oakland Raiders. After training camp, the Raiders cut Whelihan.

=== XFL career ===
Whelihan played in the XFL in 2001. He began the season with the Memphis Maniax; stuck at third string behind Jim Druckenmiller and Marcus Crandell, the league transferred Whelihan to the Chicago Enforcers midseason to replace Tim Lester. In Chicago, he largely served as a backup to Kevin McDougal.

=== Arena Football League career ===
Whelihan played for three different Arena Football League teams: the Orlando Predators (2001–2002, 2004), the Indiana Firebirds (2003), and Las Vegas Gladiators (2005–2006).

After Orlando started 0–3, Whelihan led the Predators to a four-game winning streak by June 2001. Whelihan finished the 2001 season with 224 of 377 passes completed for 3,004 yards, 60 touchdowns, and 12 interceptions. Whelihan spent the entire 2002 season on injured reserve.

In 2003, the Predators traded Whelihan to the Indiana Firebirds. In four games (with two starts), Whelihan completed 42 of 73 passes for 461 yards, 6 touchdowns, and 3 interceptions.

Whelihan returned to Orlando as a backup in 2004 and completed just 7 of 18 passes for 50 yards.

Whelihan signed with the af2 team San Diego Riptide on January 27, 2005. Never playing a game for the Riptide, Whelihan returned to the AFL in March 2005 and signed with the Las Vegas Gladiators. With Las Vegas, Whelihan started 2 of 14 games and was mainly a holder when not a starter. He completed 58 of 92 passes for 684 yards, 13 touchdowns, and 2 interceptions. In 2006 with the Gladiators, Whelihan played all 16 games and started 5 and made 131 of 223 passes for 1,677 yards, 30 touchdowns, and 11 interceptions as well as 5 rushing touchdowns.

On October 29, 2006, Whelihan signed as a free agent with the San Jose SaberCats, the AFL team in his hometown of San Jose. In 2007, he served as the backup quarterback and holder for the ArenaBowl XXI champion San Jose SaberCats.

== Career statistics ==
=== NFL ===
Year	Team	Games			Passing									Rushing				
Year	Team	GP	GS	Record	Cmp	Att	Pct	Yds	Y/A	Lng	TD	Int	Rtg	Att	Yds	Y/A	Lng	TD
1997	SD	9	7	0–7	118	237	49.8	1,357	5.7	61	6	10	58.3	13	29	2.2	7	0
1998	SD	10	7	2–5	149	320	46.6	1,803	5.6	55	8	19	48.0	18	38	2.1	13	0
Career		19	14	2–12	267	557	47.9	3,160	5.7	61	14	29	52.4	31	67	2.2	13	0

=== XFL ===
Year	Team	Games			Passing									Rushing				
Year	Team	GP	GS	Record	Cmp	Att	Pct	Yds	Y/A	Lng	TD	Int	Rtg	Att	Yds	Y/A	Lng	TD
2001	MEM	1	0	—	5	12	41.7	46	3.8	15	0	1	84.2	0	0	0.0	0	0
2001	CHI	2	0	—	4	5	80.0	30	6.0	12	0	0	91.7	4	−2	−0.5	2	0
Career		3	0	0–0	9	17	52.3	76	4.8	15	0	1	40.3	4	-2	-0.5	2	0

=== AFL ===
Year	Team	Games			Passing								Rushing			
Year	Team	GP	GS	Record	Cmp	Att	Pct	Yds	Y/A	TD	Int	Rtg	Att	Yds	Y/A	TD
2001	ORL	12	12	8–4	224	337	59.8	3,004	8.9	60	12	111.1	25	20	0.8	6
2002	ORL	Did not play due to injury														
2003	IND	4	2	0–2	42	73	57.5	461	6.3	6	3	79.8	2	−7	−3.5	0
2004	ORL	6	0	—	7	18	38.9	50	2.8	0	0	47.0	2	5	2.5	0
2005	LV	14	2	1–1	58	92	63.0	684	7.4	13	2	111.9	7	2	0.2	0
2006	LV	16	5	1–4	130	222	58.6	1,667	7.5	30	11	95.3	13	1	0.1	5
2007	SJ	16	0	—	13	21	61.9	112	5.3	1	0	87.8	1	0	0.0	0
Career		68	21	10–11	474	803	59.0	5,978	7.4	110	28	102.0	50	21	0.4	11

== Coaching career ==
In 2003, Whelihan became quarterbacks coach at La Costa Canyon High School of Carlsbad, California. He continued in that position until 2005. Whelihan also studied for a teaching credential in physical education.

== See also ==
- List of Arena Football League and National Football League players
