= Rashaad Carter =

American football player (born 1989)

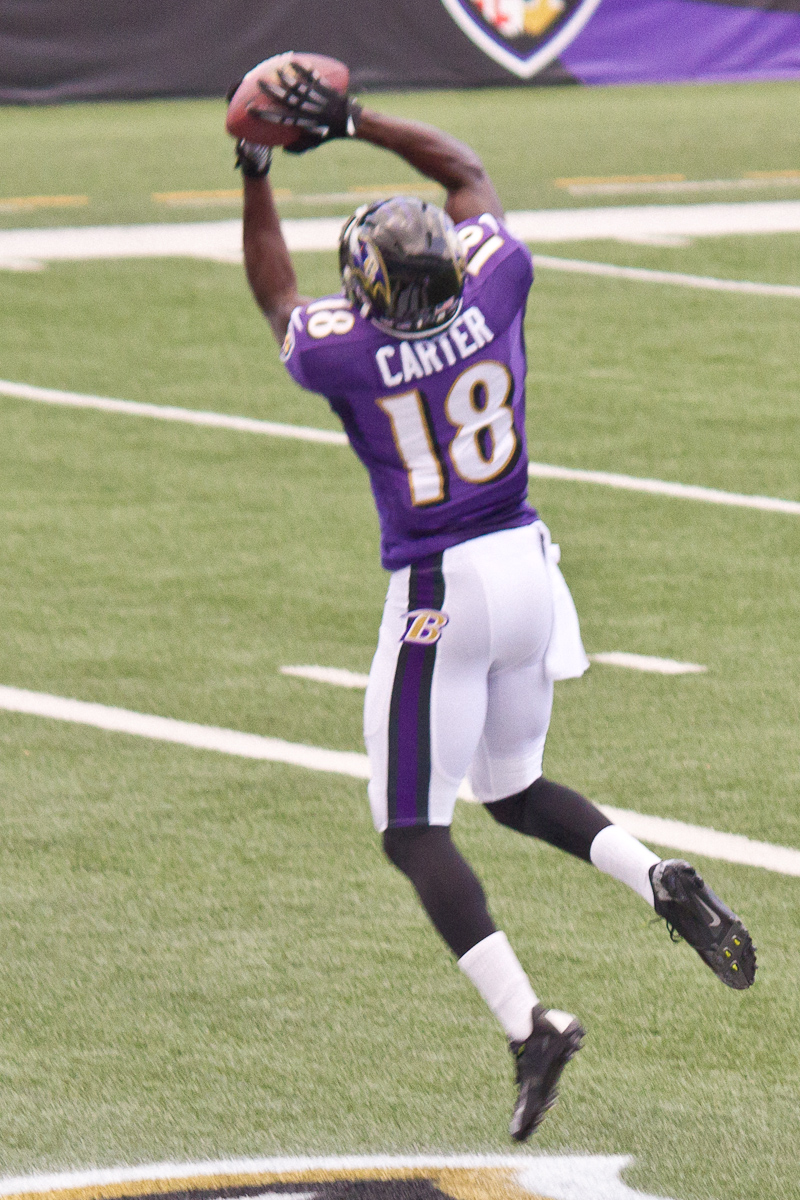
- Carter at Baltimore Ravens M&T Bank Stadium practice in 2013

No. 13, 3, 6
- Position: Wide receiver

Personal information
- Born: October 18, 1989 (age 37); Atlanta, Georgia, U.S.
- Listed height: 6 ft 3 in (1.91 m)
- Listed weight: 205 lb (93 kg)

Career information
- High school: Stone Mountain (GA) Stephenson
- College: Tusculum College
- NFL draft: 2013: undrafted

Career history
- Baltimore Ravens (2013)*; Spokane Shock (2014–2015); Portland Steel (2016); Cleveland Gladiators (2017)*; Spokane Empire (2017); Richmond Roughriders (2018); Atlantic City Blackjacks (2019)
- * Offseason or practice squad member only

Career AFL statistics
- Receptions: 186
- Receiving yards: 2,042
- Receiving TDs: 37
- Rushing TDs: 8
- Passing TDs: 2
- Stats at ArenaFan.com

Jeremy Rashaad Carter (born October 18, 1989) is an American former professional football wide receiver. He played college football at Tusculum College.

== Early life ==
He attended Stephenson High School in Stone Mountain, Georgia. He was selected to 2006 All-County and All-Region teams and also was the 2006 Offensive Player of the Year.

== College career ==
He was named to the Consensus Draft Services Preseason All-American and was selected to the Preseason All-South Atlantic Conference First-team.

== Professional career ==
=== Baltimore Ravens ===
On May 13, 2013, he signed with the Baltimore Ravens as an undrafted free agent. On August 25, 2013, he was waived by the Ravens.

=== Spokane Shock ===
On February 20, 2014, Carter was assigned to the Spokane Shock of the Arena Football League (AFL).

After an injury to the Shock's starting quarterback Erik Meyer, Carter was pressed into service as the Shock's quarterback during the May 4, 2014 contest against the LA KISS.

=== Portland Steel ===
On November 5, 2015, Carter was assigned to the Portland Thunder of the AFL's. The team was later renamed the Steel.

=== Cleveland Gladiators ===
On October 14, 2016, Carter was assigned to the AFL's Cleveland Gladiators during the dispersal draft. He was placed on reassignment on March 8, 2017.

=== Spokane Empire ===
On June 7, 2017, Carter signed with the Spokane Empire of the Indoor Football League.

=== Richmond Roughriders ===
On February 6, 2018, Carter signed with the Richmond Roughriders of the American Arena League.

=== Atlantic City Blackjacks ===
Carter was assigned to the Atlantic City Blackjacks of the AFL on June 27, 2019.
