= Apple Valley High School (Minnesota) =

High school in Apple Valley, Minnesota

Coordinates: 44°44′34″N 93°13′50″W

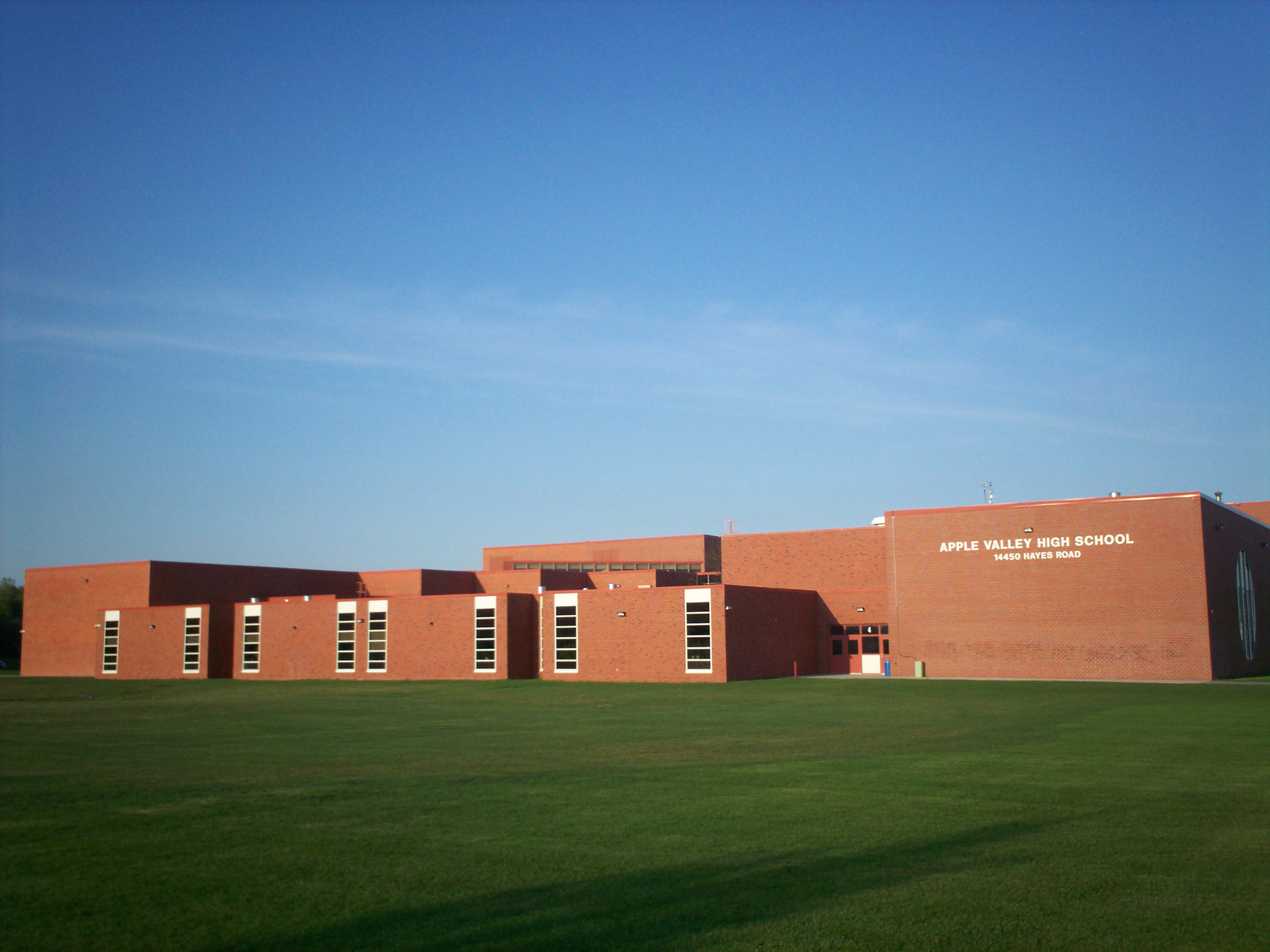
- Apple Valley High School from its western side

Location
- 14450 Hayes Road; Apple Valley, Minnesota 55124; United States

Information
- Type: Public secondary school
- Established: 1976
- School district: Independent School District 196
- Principal: Drew Mons
- Teaching staff: 113.58 (FTE)
- Grades: 9–12
- Gender: Co-educational
- Enrollment: 1,919 (2023–2024)
- Student to teacher ratio: 16.90
- Campus type: Suburban
- Colors: Brown, gold, white
- Athletics conference: Minnesota State High School League
- Mascot: Eagle
- Nickname: Eagles
- Yearbook: The Aerie
- News program: EaglEye
- Website: avhs.district196.org

Apple Valley High School (AVHS) is a four-year public secondary high school in the U.S. city of Apple Valley, Minnesota. It is one of the five high schools serving Independent School District 196 (Rosemount-Apple Valley-Eagan School District). The school was completed in 1976 as the district's second high school. It competes in the South Suburban Conference of the Minnesota State High School League (MSHSL).

== Curriculum ==
The school has numerous AP, Honors, and On-level classes. In addition, through the Minnesota state Post Secondary Enrollment Options (PSEO) program, students may take classes at local community colleges, state colleges, and universities.

== Awards ==
Apple Valley High School received an award from the National Blue Ribbon Schools Program, which is considered the highest accolade a U.S. school can receive. It has also been selected as one of the "140 best high schools" in the U.S. and has gained recognition from the National Endowment for the Arts, the Scholastic Coach and Athletic Journal, and the National Academy of Recording Arts and Science.

== Athletics ==
Apple Valley High School competes in the South Suburban Conference of the Minnesota State High School League (MSHSL). It has won 68 state championships, the second-most of any high school in Minnesota.

State championships
Season	Sport	No. of championships	Year(s)
Fall	Soccer, boys	9	1984; 1988; 1989; 1992; 1997; 1998; 2006; 2009; 2010
Fall	Soccer, girls	1	1995
Fall	Volleyball	2	1985; 1992
Fall	Football	2	1986; 1993
Fall	Swimming and diving, girls	2	1990; 1994
Winter	Hockey, boys	1	1996
Winter	Hockey, girls	2	1995; 1998
Winter	Basketball, boys	3	2013; 2015; 2017
Winter	Dance	4	1984; 1985; 1991; 1995
Winter	Wrestling	25	1983; 1985; 1986; 1991; 1994; 1995; 1997; 1999; 2000; 2001; 2002; 2003; 2004; 2006; 2007; 2008; 2009; 2010; 2011; 2012; 2013; 2014; 2015; 2016; 2017
Winter	Gymnastics, girls	2	1989; 2001
Winter	Swimming and diving, boys	2	1989; 2001
Spring	Baseball	1	2006
Spring	Golf, boys	2	1992; 1993
Spring	Track and field, boys	3	1986; 1991; 1993
Spring	Track and field, girls	7	1993; 1994; 1995; 1997; 2004; 2005; 2006

== Forensics ==
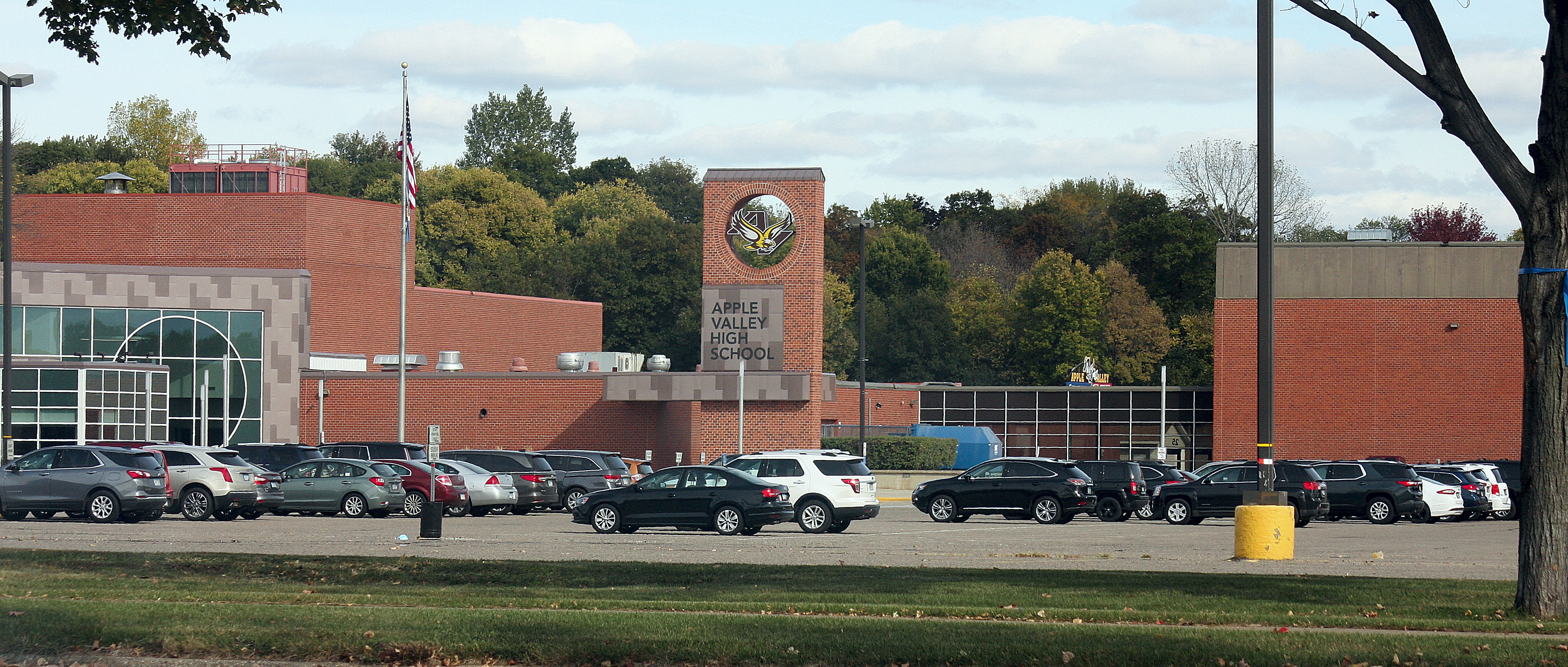
Apple Valley High School

Apple Valley's speech and debate team is one of the country's best and most successful. It has developed hundreds of state finalists and many more national qualifiers. Apple Valley High School hosts the annual MinneApple annual debate tournament and speech tournament, which draws teams from across the world.

In 2019, the school won the Minnesota High School Mock Trial Championship.

Again in 2025, the school won the Minnesota High School Mock Trial Championship.

== Fab lab ==
In 2015, Apple Valley High School opened a fab lab, the third in Minnesota, to individuals and businesses as part of its STEM program. It was built with a $3 million grant from the Minnesota Department of Labor and donations from companies such as Uponor and UTC Aerospace Systems.

== Notable alumni ==
- Brady Beeson, former placekicker for the Portland Thunder of the Arena Football League (AFL), currently plays for the Spokane Empire of the Indoor Football League (IFL), played collegiately at St. John's University and the University of St. Thomas.
- Rebekah Bradford, speed skater, competed for the United States in the 2010 Winter Olympics
- Brianna Brown, class of 1998, actress
- Arden Cho, model and actress
- Brad DeFauw, former ice hockey winger for the Carolina Hurricanes of the National Hockey League (NHL)
- Breanne Duren, touring member of the electronica project Owl City
- Hudson Fasching, ice hockey winger playing for New York Islanders
- David Fischer, hockey player, first-round pick by the Montreal Canadiens in 2006
- Karl Goehring, goaltender for the Nashville Predators
- Mark Hall, 6-time State Champion wrestler, Dave Schultz High School Excellence Award winner (2016), and 2017 NCAA Wrestling Champion at Penn State
- John Harvatine IV, co-owner of Stoopid Buddy Stoodios and executive producer on Robot Chicken
- Doug Hutchison, an actor, most notable role as Percy Wetmore in The Green Mile
- Erik Jensen, film and television actor
- Tre Jones, class of 2018, point guard for the Chicago Bulls, played collegiately for the Duke Blue Devils, younger brother of Tyus Jones.
- Tyus Jones, class of 2014, point guard for the Orlando Magic, played collegiately at Duke University.
- Vincent Kartheiser, class of 1997, actor who played Pete Campbell on the AMC drama Mad Men
- Ann Kim, award-winning chef and owner of Pizzeria Lola, Hello Pizza, and Young Joni
- Bilhal Kone, college football cornerback for the Western Michigan Broncos
- Trevor Laws, drafted by the Philadelphia Eagles of the National Football League (NFL), former Minnesota Gatorade Player of the Year and defensive lineman at Notre Dame
- Mike Lundin, former NHL defenseman for the Minnesota Wild
- Tara Mack, Minnesota House of Representatives member
- Shani Marks, triple jumper who competed in the 2008 Summer Olympics
- Bob Martin, former center in the National Basketball Association (NBA) for the Los Angeles Clippers (1993–95)
- David Maurer, former Major League Baseball (MLB) pitcher for the San Diego Padres, Cleveland Indians, and Toronto Blue Jays
- Leyna Nguyen, on-air anchor and reporter with KCAL-TV in Los Angeles, California since 1997
- Trey Pipkins, gridiron football player
- Derek Rackley, tight end and long snapper for the Seattle Seahawks
- Nicholas Sadler, an actor who has appeared in the films Scent of a Woman, Disclosure, Mobsters, as well as TV shows like The Cosby Show and ER
- Dan Sexton, right wing for the Anaheim Ducks of the NHL
- Carol Ann Shudlick, 1990 Minnesota Miss Basketball, played collegiately for the University of Minnesota, 1994 Wade Trophy winner and former Gophers' all-time scoring leader.
- Dan Smith, Class of 1987, former player for the Texas Rangers
- Varmah Sonie, 2008 Minnesota Mr. Football.
- Gable Steveson, Olympic gold medal-winning wrestler and 2020 Big Ten Heavyweight Champion and 2021 & 2022 NCAA Division I Heavyweight Champion for the University of Minnesota.
- Gary Trent Jr., (transferred before senior year), played college basketball for Duke Blue Devils, NBA player for Milwaukee Bucks
- Maria Thayer, actress and comedian
- Erik Westrum, an NHL center who played for the Phoenix Coyotes, Minnesota Wild and Toronto Maple Leafs
