= Mr. Football (Minnesota) =

Annual award to the top high school football player

The Minnesota Mr. Football award is an honor given to the top high school football player in the state of Minnesota.

== Award winners ==
Professional teams listed are teams known.

| Year | Player | Position(s) | High school | College | Professional team(s) |
|---|---|---|---|---|---|
| 2004 | Nick Mertens | QB/DB/K | East Grand Forks | North Dakota State | |
| 2005 | Matt Carufel | OL | Cretin-Derham Hall | Notre Dame; Minnesota | |
| 2006 | Blake Sorensen | LB/RB | Eden Prairie | Wisconsin | Seattle Seahawks |
| 2007 | Michael Floyd | WR | Cretin-Derham Hall | Notre Dame | Arizona Cardinals; New England Patriots; Minnesota Vikings; New Orleans Saints; Washington Redskins |
| 2008 | Varmah Sonie | DB | Apple Valley | Northern Iowa | Portland Thunder; Tampa Bay Buccaneers; Cleveland Browns; Orlando Predators; Baltimore Brigade; Albany Empire |
| 2009 | Zach Vraa | WR | Rosemount | North Dakota State | |
| 2010 | Peter Westerhaus | LB/TE | Holy Family Catholic | Minnesota | |
| 2011 | Philip Nelson | QB | Mankato West | Minnesota; Rutgers; East Carolina | Winnipeg Blue Bombers; San Diego Fleet; Dallas Renegades; Montreal Alouettes |
| 2012 | Bridgeport Tusler | RB | Osseo | South Dakota State; Bethel | |
| 2013 | Jeffrey Jones | RB | Washburn | Minnesota; Waldorf | |
| 2014 | Robbie Grimsley | RB | Hutchinson | North Dakota State | |
| 2015 | J. D. Spielman | ATH | Eden Prairie | Nebraska; TCU | |
| 2016 | Wade Sullivan | ATH | Lakeville North | Minnesota Duluth | |
| 2017 | Antonio Montero | OLB | Eden Prairie | Rice | |
| 2018 | Jason Williamson | RB | Owatonna | Minnesota | |
| 2019 | Jalen Suggs | QB | Minnehaha Academy | Gonzaga (Basketball) | Orlando Magic (NBA) |
| 2020 | Jake Ratzlaff | SS/TE | Rosemount | Wisconsin | |
| 2021 | Emmett Johnson | RB/SS | Academy of Holy Angels | Nebraska | |
| 2022 | Cade Osterman | QB/DB/KR/PR | Elk River | Minnesota; North Dakota State | |
| 2023 | Maxwell Woods | RB/CB | Chanhassen | South Dakota State | |
| 2024 | Camden Hungerholt | QB | Leroy-Ostrander | Minnesota State | |
| 2025 | Roman Voss | QB | Jackson County Central | Minnesota | |
