= Andy Olson (American football) =

American football player and coach (born 1982)

Profile
- Position: Wide receiver

Personal information
- Born: September 17, 1982 (age 44)
- Listed height: 6 ft 2 in (1.88 m)
- Listed weight: 200 lb (91 kg)

Career information
- High school: W. F. West (Chehalis, Washington)
- College: Western Washington
- NFL draft: 2006: undrafted

Career history

Playing
- Georgia Force (2008)*; Spokane Shock (2008–2009)
- * Offseason or practice squad member only

Coaching
- Spokane Shock (OC) (2011); Spokane Shock (2012–2015); Portland Thunder (2016)

Awards and highlights
- ArenaCup champion (2009)

Head coaching record
- Regular season: 42–30 (.583)
- Postseason: 1–3 (.250)
- Career: 43–33 (.566)
- Stats at ArenaFan.com

Andrew Olson (born September 17, 1982) is an arena football coach and former wide receiver. He was previously the head coach for the Spokane Shock and Portland Thunder of the Arena Football League (AFL). He played his college football at the Western Washington University, and was an af2 wide receiver from 2008 to 2009. He has been a football coach since 2011. After being the offensive coordinator for the Spokane Shock in 2011, he became the Shock head coach in 2012.

Olson grew up in Washington then continued his high school career at W. F. West High School in Chehalis, Washington. Andy then enrolled at Western Washington University, and played wide receiver on the Western Washington Vikings football team from 2001 to 2005.

The Spokane Shock signed Olson after he went unselected in the 2006 NFL draft. He played 2 years as a wide receiver in the af2 with the Shock (2008–2009), helping them win the last ArenaCup in 2009.

In 2011, while being one year removed from the af2, Olson was named offensive coordinator for the Shock, who had moved up to the Arena Football League. Under head coach Rob Keefe, whom Olson had played for in 2009. After the Shock lost during the 2011 postseason, Keefe was fired, and Olson was offered the head coaching job of the Shock. Olson helped the Shock return to the postseason in 2013, while also coaching the league MVP, Offensive Player of the Year and Wide Receiver of the Year.

On September 11, 2015, Olson was named the head coach of the Portland Thunder. However, before he could coach a down in Portland, he and his staff were abruptly replaced by new head coach Ron James on January 30, 2016 by the AFL weeks after they took over the team.

== Early life ==
Olson attended W. F. West High School in Chehalis, Washington. While at W. F. West, Olson was a member of the football, wrestling and soccer teams. As a member of the football team, he finished his career with 94 receptions, 1,758 yards and 13 touchdowns. Olson was drawing attention from many colleges, but lost scholarship offers when he tore his MCL in the final game of high school football.

== College career ==
Olson accepted a scholarship offer from Western Washington University where his brother, Lann, had been a linebacker.

== Professional career ==
Olson spent six weeks on the practice squad of the Arena Football League's Georgia Force, before being released.

Olson was signed by the Spokane Shock of af2 quickly after his release from the Force. Olson played the 2008 and 2009 seasons with the Shock, collecting over 220 receptions.

== Coaching career ==
In 2011, Olson was named the offensive coordinator for the Shock, working under his former head coach, Rob Keefe. Keefe was fired after the 2011 season, and Olson was promoted to head coach. Olson helped the Shock return to the postseason in 2013, while also coaching the league MVP, Offensive Player of the Year and the Wide Receiver of the Year. After the 2015 season, Olson stated that he was leaving the Shock. On September 11, 2015, Olson was hired as the head coach of the Portland Thunder. However, before he could coach a down in Portland, he and his staff were abruptly fired and replaced by new head coach Ron James on January 30, 2016 by the AFL weeks after they took over the team.

=== Coaching record ===
Team	Year	Regular season				Postseason			
Team	Year	Won	Lost	Win %	Finish	Won	Lost	Win %	Result
SPO	2012	10	8	.556	4th in NC West	–	–	–	–
SPO	2013	14	4	.778	2nd in NC West	1	1	.500	Lost to Arizona Rattlers in Conference Championship
SPO	2014	11	7	.611	2nd in NC Pacific	0	1	.000	Lost to San Jose SaberCats in Conference Semifinals
SPO	2015	7	11	.389	2nd in NC Pacific	0	1	.000	Lost to Arizona Rattlers in Conference Semifinals
Total		42	30	.583		1	3	.250	
