= Kenny Ladler =

American football player (born 1992)

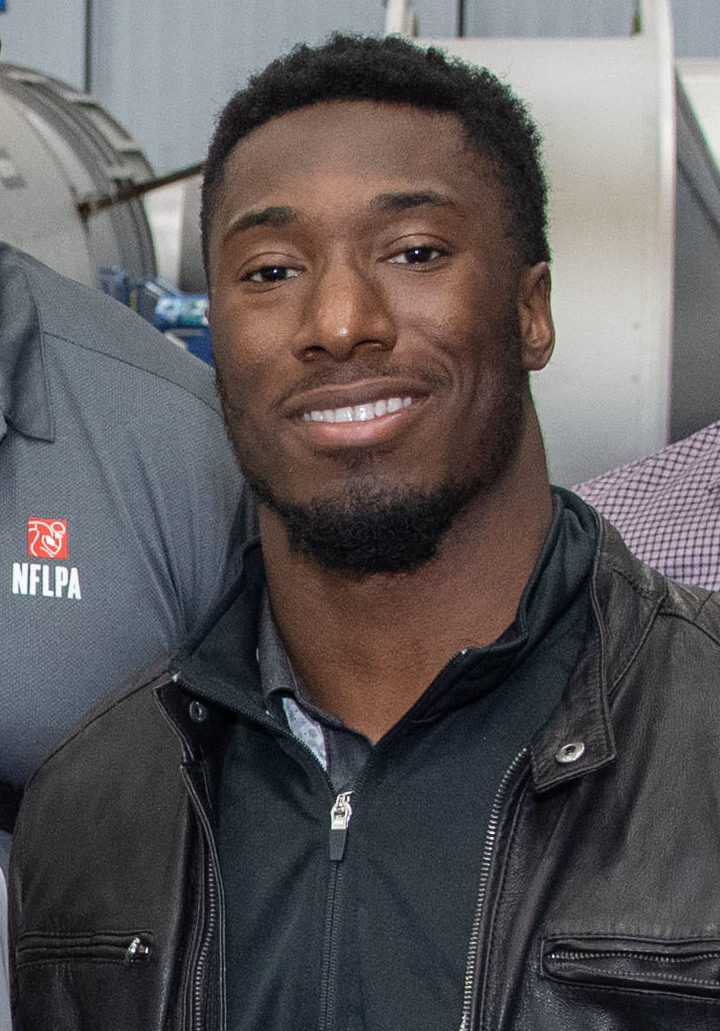
- Ladler in 2020

No. 31, 48, 33, 32
- Position: Safety

Personal information
- Born: June 23, 1992 (age 34); Stone Mountain, Georgia, U.S.
- Listed height: 6 ft 0 in (1.83 m)
- Listed weight: 200 lb (91 kg)

Career information
- High school: Stephenson (Stone Mountain)
- College: Vanderbilt (2010-2013)
- NFL draft: 2014: undrafted

Career history
- Buffalo Bills (2014); Edmonton Eskimos (2016–2017); Washington Redskins (2018); New York Giants (2018); Washington Redskins (2019); BC Lions (2020–2021)*
- * Offseason or practice squad member only

Awards and highlights
- CFL All-Star (2017); CFL West All-Star (2017); First-team All-SEC (2013); Freshman All-SEC (2010)

Career NFL statistics
- Total tackles: 17
- Stats at Pro Football Reference
- Stats at CFL.ca

Kenneth Alfonzo Ladler Jr. (born June 23, 1992) is an American former professional football player who was a safety in the National Football League (NFL) and Canadian Football League (CFL). He played college football for the Vanderbilt Commodores, and was signed as an undrafted free agent by the Buffalo Bills in 2014. He also played for the CFL's Edmonton Eskimos and BC Lions , and the Washington Redskins and New York Giants in the NFL.

== Early life ==
Ladler attended Stephenson High School in Stone Mountain, Georgia. As a senior, he helped Stephenson to an undefeated regular season and to the second round of the state playoffs. He registered 80 tackles, four interceptions and a forced fumble. He also scored on punt return, INT return and a blocked punt.

Considered a three-star recruit by Rivals.com, he was rated the 42nd best safety prospect in the nation. He committed to Vanderbilt over offers from East Carolina, Kentucky, Louisville, New Mexico, South Carolina, and Toledo.

== College career ==
As a true freshman in 2010, he appeared in every game at free safety, including nine starts for the Commodores. He finished fifth on team in total tackles with 57, while also registering 5.5 tackles for loss, a forced fumble and one interception, and was a selection on the All-SEC Freshman team. In 2010, he played in all 13 games, earning five starts. He finished the season fourth on the team with 53 tackles, while adding four pass deflections and one interception. In 2012, he started all 13 games, while leading the team with 90 tackles, three pass deflections, two interceptions and a forced fumble. In 2013, he earned first-team All-SEC honors after he recorded a team leading 91 tackles, with nine pass deflections and five interceptions. He also led the SEC and shared the NCAA lead while setting a team record with five forced fumbles.

== Professional career ==
Pre-draft measurables
Height	Weight	Arm length	Hand span	Wingspan	40-yard dash	10-yard split	20-yard split	20-yard shuttle	Three-cone drill	Vertical jump	Broad jump	Bench press
6 ft 0 1/8 in (1.83 m)	207 lb (94 kg)	31 5/8 in (0.80 m)	9 5/8 in (0.24 m)	6 ft 4 3/8 in (1.94 m)	4.70 s	1.58 s	2.69 s	4.30 s	7.09 s	36.5 in (0.93 m)	10 ft 7 in (3.23 m)	24 reps
All values from NFL Combine/Pro Day

=== Buffalo Bills ===
Ladler was signed by the Buffalo Bills as an undrafted free agent. He was among final cuts by the Bills on August 30, 2014, but was signed to the practice squad the next day. On October he was promoted to the active roster and after suffering an arm injury he was placed on season ending injured reserve on October 28, 2014. He was released by the team on September 1, 2015.

=== Edmonton Eskimos ===
Ladler was signed by the Edmonton Eskimos prior to 2016 season. In Kenny's first season in 2016, he had 70 tackles and 2 interceptions. The following season saw a major improvement for Ladler where he recorded 86 tackles and 3 interceptions, he was then named the Eskimos defensive player of the year and later named to the CFL all defense team.

=== Washington Redskins (first stint) ===
On January 9, 2018, Ladler signed a reserve/future contract with the Washington Redskins. On September 1, 2018, he was waived for final roster cuts before the start of the season, but signed with their practice squad the following day. He was promoted to the active roster on September 11, 2018. He was waived on November 6, 2018.

=== New York Giants ===
On November 14, 2018, Ladler was signed to the New York Giants practice squad. He was promoted to the active roster on December 6, 2018.

Ladler was waived/injured during final roster cuts on August 31, 2019, and reverted to the team's injured reserve list the next day. He was waived from injured reserve with an injury settlement on September 5.

=== Washington Redskins (second stint) ===
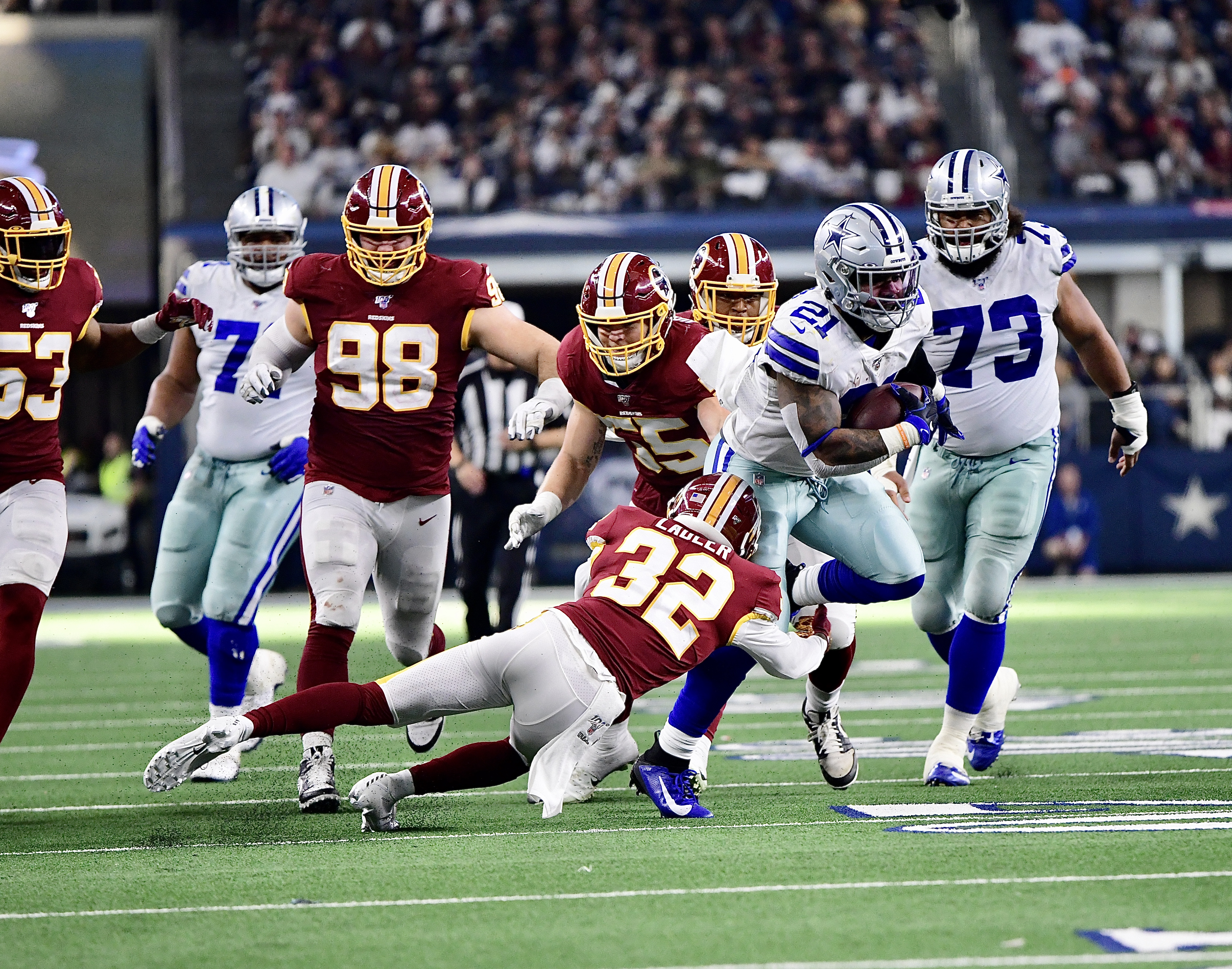
Ladler in a game against the Dallas Cowboys

Ladler signed with the Redskins on December 27, 2019, but was released on February 14, 2020.

=== BC Lions ===
Ladler signed with the BC Lions on February 25, 2020. After the CFL canceled the 2020 season due to the COVID-19 pandemic, Ladler chose to opt-out of his contract with the Lions on August 31, 2020. He opted back in to his contract on January 19, 2021. He retired from football on June 23, 2021.
