= Ron James (American football) =

American football coach (born 1964)

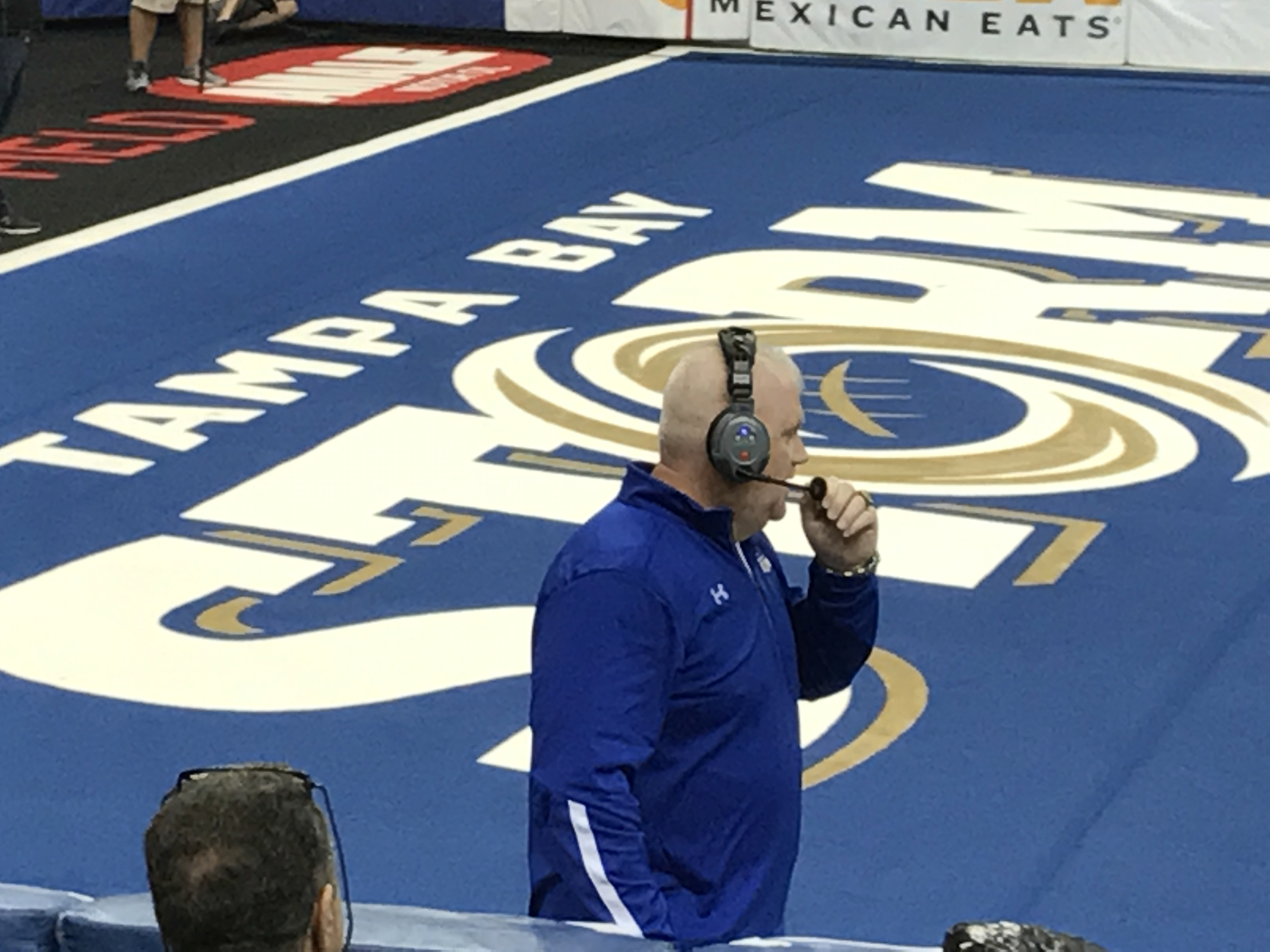
- James with the Tampa Bay Storm in 2017

Northern Arizona Wranglers
- Title: Head coach

Personal information
- Born: April 28, 1964 (age 62); Albany, New York, U.S.

Career information
- Position: Offensive lineman
- High school: Christian Brothers Academy (Albany)
- College: Siena (1982–1985)
- NFL draft: 1986: undrafted

Career history
- Siena (1986) Linebackers coach; St. Lawrence (1989–1991) Defensive coordinator & linebackers coach; Albany Firebirds (1990–1991) Assistant coach; Hartwick (1992–1993) Defensive coordinator & defensive backs coach; Kentucky Wesleyan (1993–1997) Assistant head coach, offensive coordinator, & defensive coordinator; Army (1998–1999) Offensive line coach; Houston ThunderBears (1999–2001) Offensive line coach & defensive line coach; Las Vegas Gladiators (2002–2004) Assistant head coach, special teams coordinator, offensive line coach, & defensive line coach; Las Vegas Gladiators (2005–2006) Head coach; Utah Blaze (2007–2008) Offensive line coach & defensive line coach; Utah Blaze (2010–2013) Head coach; Pittsburgh Power (2014) Head coach; Cleveland Gladiators (2015) Assistant head coach & defensive coordinator; Portland Steel (2016) Head coach; Tampa Bay Storm (2017) Head coach; Saskatchewan Roughriders (2018) Senior analyst; Atlantic City Blackjacks (2019) Head coach; Juan Diego Catholic HS (UT) (2020–2024) Head coach; Northern Arizona Wranglers (2025–present) Head coach

Awards and highlights
- 2× AFL Coach of the Year (2012, 2017)

Head coaching record
- Regular season: 74–77 (.490)
- Postseason: 2–4 (.333)
- Career: 76–81 (.484)

Ron James (born April 28, 1964) is an American football coach who is the head coach for the Northern Arizona Wranglers of the Indoor Football League (IFL). He was previously a head coach in the Arena Football League (AFL) for the Las Vegas Gladiators from 2005 to 2006, the Utah Blaze from 2010 to 2013, the Pittsburgh Power in 2014, the Portland Steel in 2016, the Tampa Bay Storm in 2017, and the Atlantic City Blackjacks in 2019.

== Early life ==
James grew up in Albany, New York, where he played football at Christian Brothers Academy. He accepted a scholarship offer from Siena College, where he was an All-American offensive lineman. He played for the Siena Saints from 1982 to 1985.

== Coaching career ==
After multiple stops coaching in the NCAA and assistant jobs in the Arena Football League (AFL), James was named the head coach of the Las Vegas Gladiators in 2004. After a he compiled a 12–18 record, James was let go and joined the Utah Blaze staff. After Danny White resigned in 2008, James was promoted to head coach of the Blaze. The Blaze folded following the 2013 season and James was hired after week one of the 2014 season by the Pittsburgh Power when they fired head coach Derek Stingley. The Power folded at the end of the season.

On January 30, 2016, James was hired as the new head coach and general manager of the team that became the Portland Steel, replacing Andy Olson. The Steel folded after the 2016 season.

On October 25, 2016, he was named the head coach of the Tampa Bay Storm. He helped the Storm to a 10–4 regular season record and a berth in ArenaBowl XXX, where they lost to the Philadelphia Soul by a score of 44–40. The Storm, who finished with a 2–14 record in 2016, became the first team in AFL history to have a winning percentage of less than .200 in a season and then earn an ArenaBowl berth the next season. James was named the AFL Coach of the Year in 2017. The Storm folded in December 2017.

In 2018, James was hired as a senior analyst for the Saskatchewan Roughriders of the Canadian Football League. He returned the AFL in 2019 as the inaugural head coach of the expansion Atlantic City Blackjacks.

== AFL head coaching record ==
Team	Year	Regular season				Postseason			
Team	Year	Won	Lost	Win %	Finish	Won	Lost	Win %	Result
LV	2005	8	8	.500	3rd in AC West	–	–	–	–
LV	2006	5	10	.333	4th in AC West	–	–	–	–
LV total		13	18	.419	–	–	–	–	
UTAH	2010	1	8	.111	3rd in NC West	–	–	–	–
UTAH	2011	9	7	.563	3rd in NC West	–	–	–	–
UTAH	2012	12	6	.667	3rd in NC West	1	1	.500	Lost to Arizona Rattlers in Conference Championship
UTAH	2013	7	11	.389	4th in NC West	–	–	–	–
UTAH total		29	32	.475	–	1	1	.500	
PIT	2014	15	2	.882	2nd in AC East	0	1	.000	Lost to Orlando Predators in Conference Semifinals
POR	2016	3	13	.188	4th in NC	0	1	.000	Lost to Arizona Rattlers in Conference Semifinals
TAM	2017	10	4	.714	2nd in AFL	1	1	.500	Lost to Philadelphia Soul in ArenaBowl XXX
AC	2019	4	8	.333	5th in AFL	–	–	–	–
Total		74	77	.490		2	4	.333	
