= Stephenson High School =

Public school in DeKalb County, Georgia, United States

Location
- 701 Stephenson Road; Stone Mountain, Georgia 30087; United States; 33.77457°N 84.12472°W

Information
- Type: Public high school
- Motto: Every Scholar, Every Day, Expect Success!
- Established: 1996
- School district: DeKalb County School System
- Principal: Dr. Kalisha Sackey
- Teaching staff: 82.50 (FTE)
- Grades: 9 - 12
- Enrollment: 1,312 (2023-2024)
- Student to teacher ratio: 15.90
- Campus: Suburban
- Colors: Royal blue and black
- Nickname: Jaguars
- Website: School website

Stephenson High School (SHS) is a public school that serves grades 9–12 in the unincorporated area of DeKalb County, Georgia, United States. It has a Stone Mountain postal address but it is not in the city limits. It is part of the DeKalb County School District.

Stephenson High School is in the old historic area near Stone Mountain. The main campus is five acres. The school has an enrollment of 1,323 students.

== Facility and curriculum ==
SHS has a 500-seat theatre equipped with two full-size dressing rooms, computer-operated lights and backdrops, an orchestra pit with hydraulic lift, and a catwalk. The Atlanta Theatre Organ Society donated and installed an organ with full piping. Stephenson is one of three schools in the country to house such an organ, and uses it for musicals and concerts.

Students study horticulture, landscaping, and botany in an outdoor classroom which includes a waterfall and two greenhouses.

The school offers a broadcast and media production curriculum. The program components include JAG 8 News, SHS's television station; Jaguar Enterprises, which shoots, edits and produces programs for community members; and Jaguar Records, a recording label.

== Notable alumni ==
- Alade Aminu - basketball player, older brother of NBA forward Al-Farouq Aminu, 2015–16 Israel Basketball Premier League rebounding leader
- Andre' Anderson - former NFL player, Detroit Lions
- Michael Ashe - gymnast
- Joanna Atkins - Olympic track and field sprinter
- Marcus Ball - former NFL player, New Orleans Saints, Carolina Panthers
- Reggie Ball - former NFL player for Detroit Lions and Georgia Tech quarterback
- Gail Bean - actress
- Anthony Cannon - former NFL player, Detroit Lions
- Rashaad Carter - former NFL player, Baltimore Ravens
- Jermaine Cunningham - former NFL player, New York Jets
- Mike Davis - NFL player, Atlanta Falcons, Carolina Panthers
- Donald Glover - Actor and musician(attended)
- Bruce Irvin - NFL player, Seattle Seahawks
- J.I.D - rapper
- Dontell Jefferson - former NBA player, Charlotte Bobcats
- Shaun Jolly - NFL players, Cleveland Browns, Los Angeles Rams
- Kenny Ladler - NFL player, New York Giants, Washington Commanders
- Lloyd - R&B singer
- Kregg Lumpkin - former NFL player, Green Bay Packers
- DeMario Minter - former NFL player, Cleveland Browns
- Byron Parker - NFL player, Jacksonville Jaguars, Dallas Cowboys, Philadelphia Eagles; CFL player, Toronto Argonauts
- Perry Riley - former NFL player, Washington Commanders
- Chauncey Rivers - NFL player, Green Bay Packers
- Roderick Rogers - former NFL player, Denver Broncos
- Kelvin Sheppard - former NFL player and current coach, Detroit Lions
- Ronnie Shields - former NFL player, Seattle Seahawks
- Preston Smith - NFL player, Washington Commanders and Green Bay Packers
- Montez Sweat - NFL player, Washington Commanders
- D. J. Wonnum - NFL player, Minnesota Vikings
- O. J. Hogans - American sprinter, World Indoor Championships winner
