= Varmah Sonie =

American football player (born 1990)

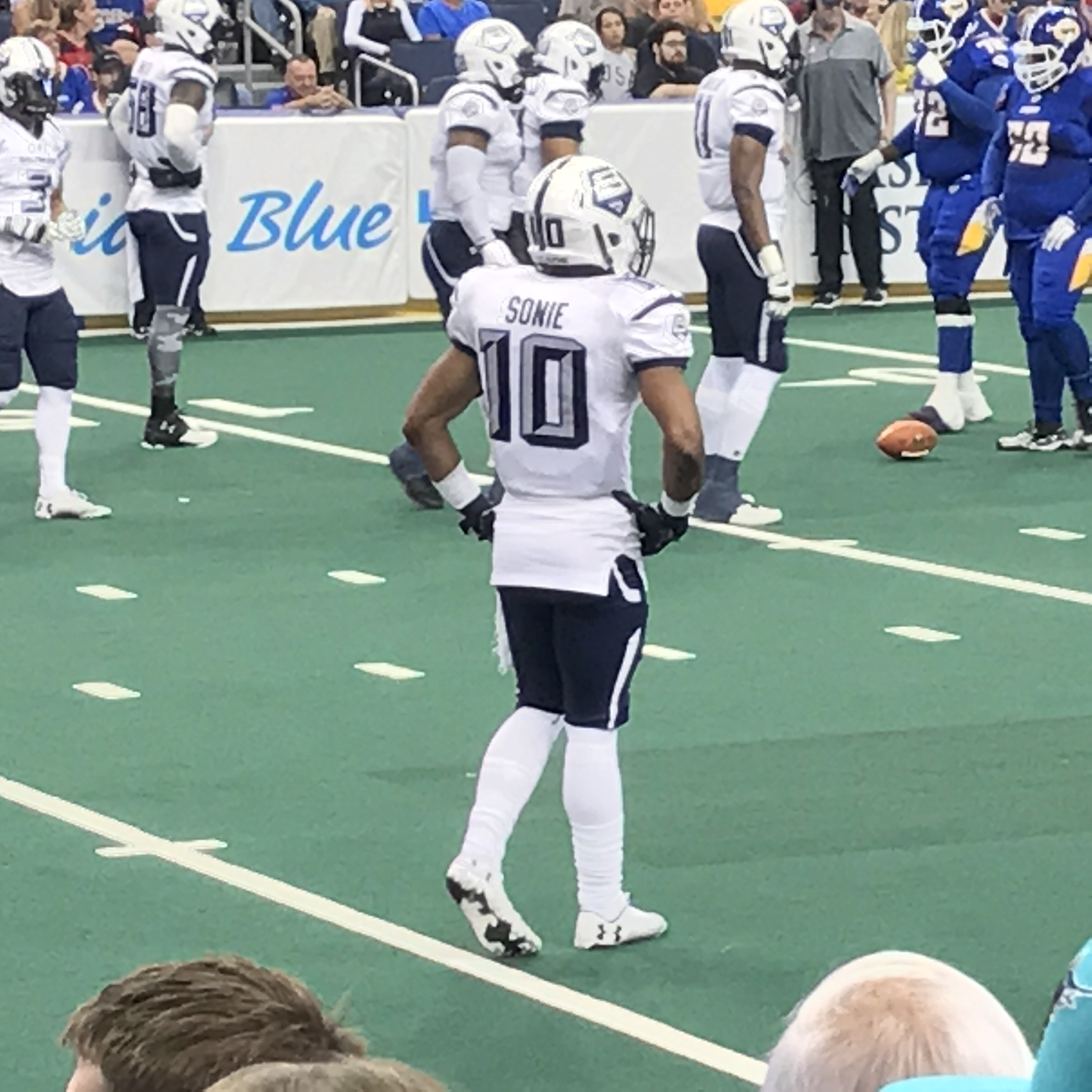
- Sonie with the Baltimore Brigade in 2017

No. 10, 24
- Position: Cornerback

Personal information
- Born: July 8, 1990 (age 36); Burnsville, Minnesota, U.S.
- Listed height: 5 ft 8 in (1.73 m)
- Listed weight: 175 lb (79 kg)

Career information
- High school: Apple Valley (MN)
- College: Northern Iowa (2009–2012)
- NFL draft: 2013: undrafted

Career history
- Portland Thunder (2014); Tampa Bay Buccaneers (2014)*; Cleveland Browns (2015)*; Portland Thunder (2015); Orlando Predators (2016); Baltimore Brigade (2017); Albany Empire (2018); Columbus Destroyers (2019)
- * Offseason or practice squad member only

Awards and highlights
- First-team All-MVC (2011); 2× First-team All-Arena (2014, 2016); 2× Second-team All-Arena (2017, 2018)

Career AFL statistics
- Total tackles: 287
- Forced fumbles: 5
- Pass deflections: 67
- Interceptions: 23
- Stats at ArenaFan.com

Varmah Sonie (born July 8, 1990) is an American former professional football cornerback. He played college football at Northern Iowa.

== Early life ==
Sonie attended Apple Valley High School in Apple Valley, Minnesota, where he played football, basketball and track and field. As a senior member of the football team in 2008, Sonie played defensive back, wide receiver and was the Return specialist for the Eagles, catching in 41 passes, received 36 carries and had 6 interceptions, totaling in 10 touchdowns. His season earned him Minnesota's Mr. Football Award, as well as being named a Max Prep All-American.

== College career ==
Sonie continued his football career at the University of Northern Iowa. As a junior in 2011, Sonie was named First-team All-Missouri Valley Football Conference.

== Professional career ==
=== Portland Thunder ===
In November 2013, Sonie was assigned to the Portland Thunder of the Arena Football League (AFL). In 2014, his play earned him First-team All-Arena honors.

=== Tampa Bay Buccaneers ===
On December 16, 2014, Sonie signed to the practice squad of the Tampa Bay Buccaneers of the National Football League (NFL).

=== Cleveland Browns ===
On February 16, 2015, Sonie signed a three-year contract with the Cleveland Browns of the National Football League (NFL). He was waived on May 11, 2015.

=== Orlando Predators ===
On January 4, 2016, Sonie was assigned to the Orlando Predators.

=== Baltimore Brigade ===
On February 1, 2017, Sonie was assigned to Baltimore Brigade. He earned Second-team All-Arena honors in 2017.

=== Albany Empire ===
On March 19, 2018, Sonie was assigned to the Albany Empire.

=== Columbus Destroyers ===
On March 5, 2019, Sonie was assigned to the Columbus Destroyers.

=== Albany Empire ===
On July 19, 2021, Sonie was signed again by the Albany Empire (NAL)
