= Bryan Still =

American football player (born 1974)

No. 80, 86, 83
- Position: Wide receiver

Personal information
- Born: June 3, 1974 (age 52); Newport News, Virginia, U.S.
- Listed height: 5 ft 11 in (1.80 m)
- Listed weight: 174 lb (79 kg)

Career information
- High school: Huguenot (Richmond, Virginia)
- College: Virginia Tech
- NFL draft: 1996: 2nd round, 41st overall pick

Career history
- San Diego Chargers (1996–1999); Atlanta Falcons (1999); Dallas Cowboys (1999); Chicago Bears (2000)*
- * Offseason or practice squad member only

Career NFL statistics
- Receptions: 83
- Receiving yards: 1,181
- Receiving touchdowns: 2
- Stats at Pro Football Reference

Bryan Andrei Still (born June 3, 1974) is an American former professional football player who was a wide receiver in the National Football League (NFL). He was the MVP of the 1995 Sugar Bowl.

== College career ==
Still played college football for the Virginia Tech Hokies. He finished his career at Virginia Tech with 74 catches for 1,458 yards and 11 touchdowns, and was named MVP of the 1995 Sugar Bowl, in which Virginia Tech defeated Texas 28–10 on December 31, 1995. In this game, Still had 6 catches for 119 yards and 1 touchdown, and also returned a punt 60 yards for another touchdown.

== Professional career ==
He was a second round selection (41st overall pick) by the San Diego Chargers in the 1996 NFL draft. He played for the San Diego Chargers (1996–1999), the Atlanta Falcons (1999), and the Dallas Cowboys (1999).

Season	Catches	Yards	Touchdowns
1996	6	142	0
1997	24	324	0
1998	43	605	2
1999	10	110	0
Career	83	1181	2

== Post-NFL ==
Still teaches health education and physical education. He also coached track and field for 15 years (2006–2020) at Cosby High School in Midlothian, Virginia.
