= Atlantic City Blackjacks =

Arena football team

Logo

General information
- Founded: 2019
- Folded: 2019
- Headquartered: Boardwalk Hall in Atlantic City, New Jersey
- Colors: Black, red, gold and silver
- ACBlackjacks.com

Personnel
- Owners: Trifecta Sports and Entertainment
- Head coach: Ron James

Team history
- Atlantic City Blackjacks (2019)

Home fields
- Boardwalk Hall (2019)

League / conference affiliations
- Arena Football League (2019)

The Atlantic City Blackjacks were a professional arena football team based in Atlantic City, New Jersey, that played in the Arena Football League (AFL) in 2019.

== History ==
Home games were played at Boardwalk Hall. The team was operated by Trifecta Sports and Entertainment, the same ownership group as the Albany Empire and Philadelphia Soul. On January 31, the team announced two-time AFL coach of the year Ron James as its inaugural head coach. After a name-the-team contest, the name Blackjacks was announced on March 7. After the Blackjacks' first season, the entire league ceased operations.

A revival of the league set to begin play in 2024 had discussions with Atlantic City about reviving the Blackjacks but found the city's terms to be unacceptable.

== Coaches and personnel ==
=== Head coaches ===
Name	Term	Regular season			Playoffs			Awards
Name	Term	W	L	Win%	W	L	Win%	Awards
Ron James	2019	4	8	.333	0	0	–	

=== Staff ===
Atlantic City Blackjacks staff
Ownership: Stewart Anmuth; Hal Brunson; Pete Ciarrocchi; Marques Colston; Cosmo DeNicola; Jahri Evans; Nicholas Giuffre; George Randolph Hearst III; Philip Jaurigue; Ron Jaworski; Martin E. Judge; Daniel Nolan; Gil Peter; Ed Sawyer; Craig A. Spencer; Dick Vermeil	Coaches: Head coach – Ron James; Offensive coordinator – Shane Stafford; Defensive coordinator – Sergio Gilliam; Defensive line and linebackers coach – Caesar Rayford; Director of player personnel – Brandon Lang

== Season-by-season results ==
ArenaBowl champions	ArenaBowl appearance	Division champions	Playoff berth

Season	League	Conference	Division	Regular season			Postseason results
Season	League	Conference	Division	Finish	Wins	Losses	Postseason results
2019	AFL	—	—	5th	4	8	
Total					4	8	(includes only regular season)
Total					0	0	(includes only the postseason)
Total					4	8	(includes both regular season and postseason)
