= Cedric Harden =

American gridiron football player (born 1974)

No. 92
- Position: Defensive end

Personal information
- Born: October 19, 1974 (age 52); Atlanta, Georgia, U.S.
- Listed height: 6 ft 6 in (1.98 m)
- Listed weight: 260 lb (118 kg)

Career information
- High school: Therrell (Atlanta)
- College: Florida A&M
- NFL draft: 1998: 5th round, 126th overall pick

Career history
- San Diego Chargers (1998-1999); Amsterdam Admirals (2000); Los Angeles Xtreme (2001); Saskatchewan Roughriders (2001)

Career NFL statistics
- Tackles: 1
- Sacks: 0.5
- Stats at Pro Football Reference

Cedric Harden (born October 19, 1974) is an American former professional football player who was a defensive end in the National Football League (NFL) and Canadian Football League (CFL). He played college football for the Florida A&M Rattlers. He played in the NFL for the San Diego Chargers in 1999 and for the CFL's Saskatchewan Roughriders in 2001. He also played for the Los Angeles Xtreme of the XFL in 2001.
