= 2005 Las Vegas Gladiators season =

Arena Football League team season

- Head coach: Ron James
- Home stadium: Thomas & Mack Center

Results
- Record: 8–8
- Division place: 3rd AC Western
- Playoffs: Did not qualify

The 2005 Las Vegas Gladiators season was the 9th season for the franchise. They finished at 8–8, 3rd in the Western Division. The Gladiators did not qualify for the playoffs.

== Coaching ==
Ron James entered his first season as the head coach of the Gladiators, having been hired in August 2004.

== Stats ==
=== Offense ===
==== Quarterback ====
Player	Comp.	Att.	Comp%	Yards	TD's	INT's	Long	Rating

==== Running backs ====
Player	Car.	Yards	Avg.	TD's	Long

==== Wide receivers ====
Player	Rec.	Yards	Avg.	TD's	Long

==== Touchdowns ====
Player	TD's	Rush	Rec	Ret	Pts

=== Defense ===
Player	Tackles	Solo	Assisted	Sack	Solo	Assisted	INT	Yards	TD's	Long

=== Special teams ===
==== Kick return ====
Player	Ret	Yards	TD's	Long	Avg	Ret	Yards	TD's	Long	Avg

==== Kicking ====
Player	Extra pt.	Extra pt. Att.	FG	FGA	Long	Pct.	Pts
