= 2006 Las Vegas Gladiators season =

Arena Football League team season

- Head coach: Ron James
- Home stadium: Thomas & Mack Center

Results
- Record: 5–11
- Division place: 4th AC Western
- Playoffs: Did not qualify

The 2006 Las Vegas Gladiators season was the 10th season for the franchise. They finished the season 5–11, 4th place in the Western Division. The Gladiators did not qualify for the playoffs.

== Stats ==
=== Offense ===
==== Quarterback ====
Player	Comp.	Att.	Comp%	Yards	TD's	INT's	Long	Rating

==== Running backs ====
Player	Car.	Yards	Avg.	TD's	Long

==== Wide receivers ====
Player	Rec.	Yards	Avg.	TD's	Long

==== Touchdowns ====
Player	TD's	Rush	Rec	Ret	Pts

=== Defense ===
Player	Tackles	Solo	Assisted	Sack	Solo	Assisted	INT	Yards	TD's	Long

=== Special teams ===
==== Kick return ====
Player	Ret	Yards	TD's	Long	Avg	Ret	Yards	TD's	Long	Avg

==== Kicking ====
Player	Extra pt.	Extra pt. Att.	FG	FGA	Long	Pct.	Pts
