= Portland Steel =

Arena football team

Logo

General information
- Founded: 2013
- Folded: 2016
- Headquartered: Moda Center in Portland, Oregon
- Colors: Navy blue, royal blue, silver
- PDXSteel.com

Personnel
- Owner: Arena Football League
- Head coach: Ron James
- President: Meadow Lemon

Team history
- Portland Thunder (2014–2015); Portland Steel (2016)

Home fields
- Moda Center (2014–2016)

League / conference affiliations
- Arena Football League (2014–2016): National Conference (2014–2016); Pacific Division (2014–2015)

Playoff appearances (3)
- 2014, 2015, 2016

The Portland Steel were a professional arena football team based in Portland, Oregon and members of the Arena Football League (AFL). The team started as the Portland Thunder, joining the AFL in 2014 as an expansion team along with the Los Angeles Kiss. The team played their home games at the Moda Center. They were known as the Thunder until the franchise went under league ownership in 2016 and became the Steel.

== History ==
=== Expansion/Birth of the Portland Thunder (2013) ===
On October 2, 2013, a press conference was held at the Moda Center where it was announced that sports investor Terry Emmert had purchased the membership rights to an AFL franchise. Emmert purchased the Milwaukee Mustangs, which had been a defunct franchise since the 2012 season. This essentially gave Emmert the right to an expansion franchise, since none of the team's Milwaukee roots, such as players, front office staff or coaches, remained. When asked what the biggest challenge to running a new franchise was, team president Jared Rose said, "Getting new fans to buy into something that the market really hasn’t seen before. Any new product launch is difficult, but we’ve got an exciting product that once people see it, they are hooked."

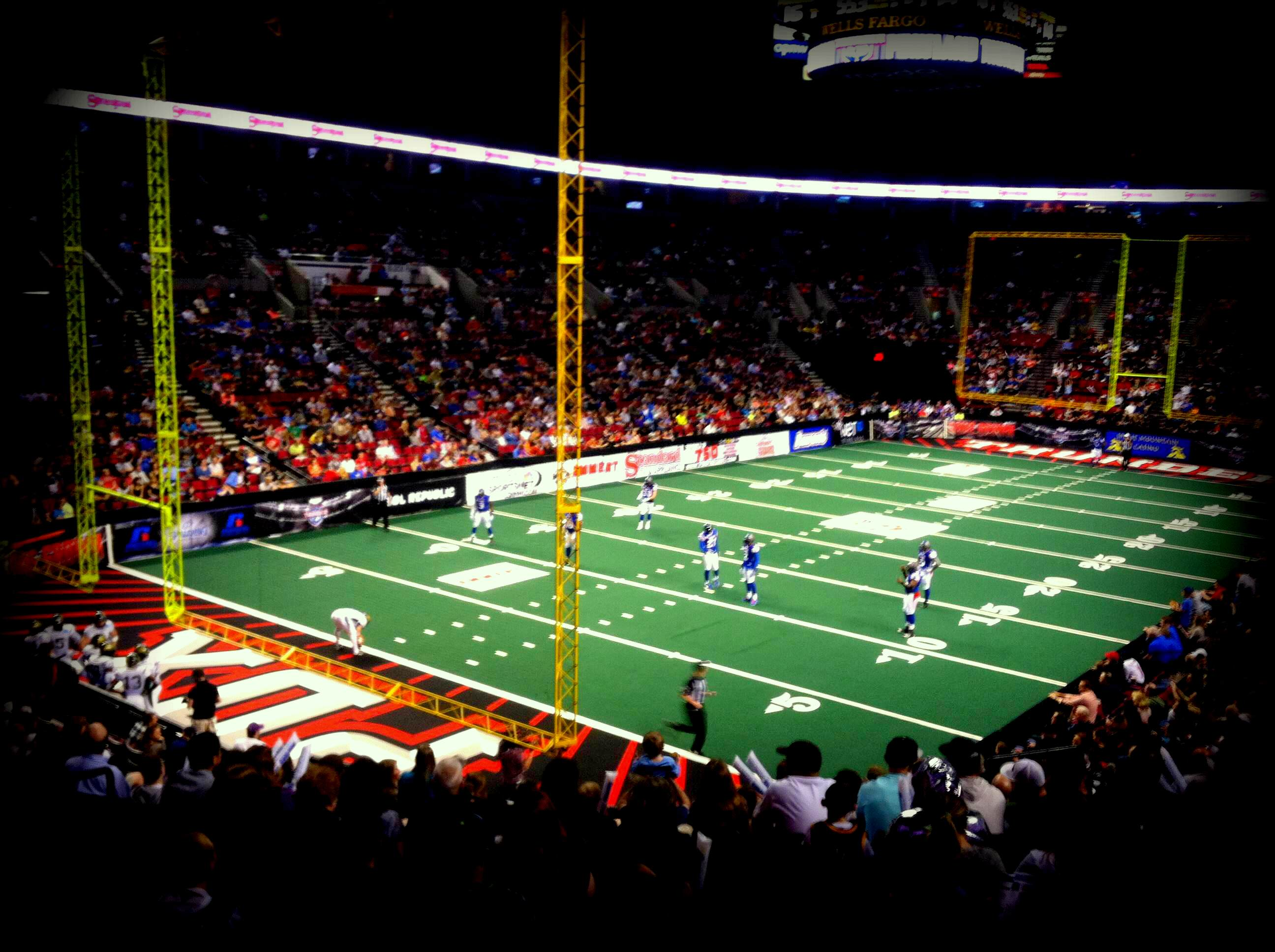
The Thunder/Steel's home field at the Moda Center during a game against the San Jose SaberCats in 2014.

On November 8, 2013, the franchise announced that the nicknames, "Thunder", "Enforcers", "Sasquatch", "Growlers" and "Stomp" were the finalist for the team. Six days later, Emmert revealed the team's nickname would be the "Thunder." The Thunder nickname has history in Portland dating back to the 1975 Portland Thunder, who played at Civic Stadium as members of the World Football League (WFL). John Canzano, sports columnist for The Oregonian, wrote that a "team source" indicated that team owner Terry Emmert selected the team's nickname himself, despite claiming that fans would have the ultimate say. According to Canzano's source the "Growlers" nickname was the most popular among voters followed by the "Sasquatch".

=== Inaugural season (2014) ===
The Portland Thunder began their training camp and held a media day on February 25, 2014. On March 1, the team held an intra-squad scrimmage for season ticket holders at Tualatin Indoor Soccer in Tualatin, Oregon. Their first game occurred on March 17 against the San Jose SaberCats at the Moda Center.

On February 12, 2014 it was announced that the Thunder had signed former Portland State Vikings wide receiver Justin Monahan, who is a native of West Linn, Oregon. The Thunder have former Oregon Ducks quarterback Darron Thomas on their inaugural roster. When asked about being assigned to Portland, Thomas said, "That was one of the main reasons I came back and accepted this opportunity to come here, just for the fans and I know people are behind me [...] I'm coming in to compete and be the starter and that's what I came out here for."

The Thunder played their first game on St. Patrick's Day, March 17, as 8,509 people came to the Moda Center to see the team lose 64–34 to the San Jose SaberCats. The team started 0–5 before beating the Jacksonville Sharks 69–62 on the road in week 7. After starting 0–4 at home, the Thunder won their first game in Portland in week 11, beating the San Antonio Talons 55–40. Despite finishing 5–13, including an 0–6 divisional record and an even more ghastly 2–11 conference record, the National Conference was so weak, the Thunder slipped into the playoffs. In the conference semifinals, the Thunder actually led 48–45 with less than a minute left, before a miracle finish caused them to lose to the 2-time reigning champion Arizona Rattlers, 52–48. On September 23, 2014, the Thunder fired head Coach Matthew Sauk. Days later, the team announced the hiring of former Iowa Barnstormers head coach Mike Hohensee.

=== Second season (2015) ===
The team finished with the same results in 2015, finishing 5–13. Originally the team finished behind Las Vegas in the playoff race. However, as the AFL folded Las Vegas after the season, they had amazingly slipped into the playoffs again. They lost to the San Jose SaberCats. On August 24, 2015, head coach Mike Hohensee and his coaching staff mutually agreed to part ways.

On September 11, 2015, the Thunder agreed to terms to hire former Spokane Shock head coach Andy Olson as its third head coach in three years.

=== Third season (2016) ===
On January 6, 2016, the AFL announced that they took over operations of the Portland Thunder from owner Terry Emmert. Emmert told the Portland Tribune newspaper that the future of the team was up in the air because he was concerned with the league's medical insurance policies and was hoping to try to attract more investors to help fund the team. This prompted league officials and the board of directors to take control of the franchise and look for new owners. The league also decided to fire Andy Olson and his entire coaching staff before Olson coached a down for the Thunder and replaced them on January 30, 2016, with former Las Vegas Gladiators, Utah Blaze, and Pittsburgh Power head coach Ron James. James was also named the team's general manager.

In 2014, Emmert had trademarked the Thunder name, logo, color scheme, and identity (similar to what Dallas Cowboys owner Jerry Jones did with the identity of the now-defunct Dallas Desperados in the early 2000s). As of February 3, 2016, Emmert still legally owned the trademarks of the team, despite reports to the contrary, and had no intentions of selling them to the league. Because Emmert owns the rights to the name, there was a possibility of a return of the Thunder name to the AFL or a new team named Thunder joining the Indoor Football League, but only if the Portland AFL franchise fails in 2016.

On February 24, 2016, the franchise was given a new name, re-branded the Portland Steel by the AFL. The name was derived from the region's steel industry and rich history. According to the AFL's website, the steel industry has been a backbone of the Portland working culture for over 150 years. Steel is an overtly visible part of the Portland landscape, with foundries decorating both the Willamette and Columbia Rivers, and is seen in several of the city's 12 iconic bridges.

The Steel finished the 2016 season with a 3–13, but were guaranteed a playoff spot as all teams played in the playoffs. The team lost in the first round to Arizona, 84–40, in what would be the team's last game. The AFL officially folded the Steel franchise in October 2016 and placed its players into a dispersal draft conducted on October 14, 2016.

=== Accusations of mismanagement and unpaid bills ===
On September 7, 2017, Portland television station KGW did an investigation about the AFL's operations following the takeover of the franchise from Emmert and reported that the league's owners Arena Football One, LLC, quietly shut down the operations following the 2016 season and left town leaving a trail of unpaid bills and failing to pay former employees and vendors money owed to them.

After taking over the franchise and re-branding it as the Steel, AFL commissioner Scott Butera said in a press release, "We highly value the Thunder fans and this step was needed to stabilize the team in the Portland market."

Employees, staff, vendors and even broadcasters were owned combined thousands of dollars in unpaid bills prompting several lawsuits against Arena Football One, LLC. As of September 2017, only one lawsuit was settled out of court. Phone calls and emails to the league office in Las Vegas went unanswered. The investigation even uncovered a sports jersey company in Las Vegas being owed $13,000 for manufacturing home black jerseys for the Las Vegas Outlaws in 2016. That company had still not been paid and there has been no indication of payment.

Additionally, the same former employees and vendors received a letter from a law office in Vermont representing "Arena Football One, LLC". The letter said the league was restructuring finances, but offered 10 to 15 percent of the money owed, if the former employees agreed not to sue. The parties refused the offer and still planned on suing the now-former AFL ownership group following the report at the time.

== Return of the AFL to Oregon ==
On February 1, 2023, four years after the folding of the second incarnation of the AFL and seven years after the demise of the Steel, a third incarnation of the AFL was announced as were 16 potential cities reported by TMZ. One of the new teams would be based in Oregon, but not Portland. Instead, the new franchise would be located in Salem, much to the surprise of many. On October 25, 2023, the new team was officially announced and will be known as the Oregon Blackbears. However, that team folded after various complications and playing only three games. It was replaced by the Oregon Lightning the following year, that team being based in Redmond in the revival league's successor, Arena Football One. The Lightning name was chosen in homage to the Thunder.

== Notable players ==
=== All-Arena players ===
The following Thunder/Steel players were named to All-Arena Teams:

- C John Collins (1)
- LB Bryce Peila (1)
- DB Varmah Sonie (1)
- KR Duane Brooks (1)

== Head coaches ==
On October 8, 2013, Matthew Sauk was named the Thunder's inaugural head coach. Sauk had previously worked for the Utah Blaze, where he served as an assistant coach and offensive coordinator. Following the team's inaugural season, in which Sauk led Portland to a 5–13 record, Sauk was dismissed as head coach and replaced by Mike Hohensee. On August 24, 2015, Hohensee suffered the same exact fate as he and his staff mutually agreed to part ways after he coached the team to an identical 5-13 record and a second trip to the playoffs. On September 11, 2015, Andy Olson was named the team's third head coach in franchise history. On January 30, 2016, Ron James replaced Olson as head coach.

Name	Term	Regular season				Playoffs		Awards
Name	Term	W	L	T	Win%	W	L	Awards
Matthew Sauk	2014	5	13	0	.278	0	1	
Mike Hohensee	2015	5	13	0	.278	0	1	
Andy Olson	Did not coach	0	0	0	–	0	0	
Ron James	2016	3	13	0	.188	0	1	

== Seasons ==
ArenaBowl champions	ArenaBowl appearance	Division champions	Playoff berth

Season	Team	League	Conference	Division	Regular season			Postseason results
Season	Team	League	Conference	Division	Finish	Wins	Losses	Postseason results
Portland Thunder
2014	2014	AFL	National	Pacific	3rd	5	13	Lost Conference Semifinals (Arizona) 48–52
2015	2015	AFL	National	Pacific	3rd	5	13	Lost Conference Semifinals (San Jose) 28–55
Portland Steel
2016	2016	AFL	National	—	4th	3	13	Lost Conference Semifinals (Arizona) 40-84
Total						13	39	(includes only regular season)
Total						0	3	(includes only the postseason)
Total						13	42	(includes both regular season and postseason)

== Media ==
On March 11, 2014, the Thunder established a local television deal with NBC Sports Northwest. Scott Lynn provided play-by-play, Jordan Kent was a color analyst, and Megan Berrey served as sideline reporter. Periodically, Portland Trail Blazers TV broadcaster Mike Barrett filled in on play-by-play. They also announced a radio deal with KXTG Sports Radio 750 AM with Jeremy Scott on the play-by-play and Brian Perkins as color analyst.
