= Yakima Canines =

American indoor football team

Logo

General information
- Founded: 2019; 7 years ago
- Folded: 2022
- Headquartered: Yakima, Washington at Yakima Valley SunDome
- Colors: Black, green, orange, white
- GoCanineFootball.com

Personnel
- Owners: Warren Reynolds; Michael Foster
- General manager: Warren Reynolds
- Head coach: Warren Reynolds

Nickname
- Canines

Team history
- Yakima Canines (2021)

Home fields
- Yakima Valley SunDome (2021)

League / conference affiliations
- American West Football Conference (2021)

Playoff appearances (0)
- 0

The Yakima Canines were a professional indoor football team based in Yakima, Washington. That began play in 2021 with home games at the Yakima Valley SunDome. They were the third team to play in the Yakima Valley since the Yakima Shockwave of the National Indoor Football League in 2001 and the Yakima Valley Warriors of the American Indoor Football Association in 2011. They were co-owned by head coach Warren Reynolds and defensive coach Michael Foster.

== History ==
On October 15, 2018, the American West Football Conference (AWFC) was founded by the Idaho Horsemen and added the Wenatchee Valley Skyhawks, Reno Express, and Tri-Cities Fire to create the league.

The Canines were founded in 2019 by Warren Reynolds, who served as owner and head coach. The team signed a one-year agreement with the SunDome as the prepared to play in the 2020 season scheduled to face the Fire in Kennewick and host the Express the first week of March.

However, prior to the planned start of the 2020 AWFC season, the AWFC had postponed the season due to the ongoing COVID-19 pandemic and then cancelled the season entirely due to the unavailability of arenas during the pandemic. The AWFC played the 2021 season, adding two teams in the Oregon High Desert Storm and Tri-City Rush, and the Canines finally made their debut in May 2021.

The Canines played their entire season in 2021. However prior to the start of the 2022 season, the franchise had its membership revoked due to not meeting league minimum operating requirements. They were replaced by the Washington Elite travel team to fill the rest of the league's home schedule. The team have been dormant ever since and are considered folded as of 2022 and the league itself folded in 2024.

== Season-by-season records ==
League champions	Playoff berth

Season	League	Regular season			Postseason results
Season	League	Finish	Wins	Losses	Postseason results
2020	AWFC	Season canceled due to the COVID-19 pandemic			
2021	AWFC	N/A	?	?	Did not qualify
Total			0	0	All-time regular season record (2021)
Total			0	0	All-time postseason record (2021)
Total			0	0	All-time regular season and postseason record (2021)
