= Oregon Lightning =

American indoor football team

Logo

General information
- Founded: 2020; 6 years ago
- Headquartered: First Interstate Bank Center in Redmond, Oregon
- Colors: Orange, gold, white, black
- TheOregonLightning.com

Personnel
- Owners: Chuck Jones; Sara Gumm; Jay Jenkins
- General manager: Chuck Jones
- Head coach: John Charles

Nickname
- Lightning

Team history
- Oregon High Desert Storm (2021–2024); Oregon Lightning (2025–present)

Home fields
- First Interstate Bank Center (2021–present)

League / conference affiliations
- American West Football Conference (2021–2023); Arena Football One (2025–2026); West Division (2025)

Playoff appearances (2)
- 2021, 2023

The Oregon Lightning were a professional indoor football team based in Redmond, Oregon. They were founded in 2020 and began playing football as members of the American West Football Conference in 2021, known then as the Oregon High Desert Storm. It is the first team to play in Central Oregon. They are owned by Chuck Jones, former head coach of the Arena Football League's Oregon Blackbears, along with Sara Gumm and Jay Jenkins. They were members of Arena Football One (AF1) from 2025 to 2026 before leaving that league to pursue new opportunities. They play their home games at the First Interstate Bank Center at the Deschutes County Fairgrounds in Redmond.

== History ==
The Lightning are the fourth official Oregon-based team to play major league arena football and are the second to play outside of the Portland, Oregon, area. They are also the first "major" sports team based in Deschutes County. The team will have the smallest arena capacity in the league set at 4,000. Their main geographic rivals in AF1 are the Washington Wolfpack and Billings Outlaws. Their logo was created using Artificial Intelligence and finalized as a two-dimensional logo with the Oregon state map in the background behind a sasquatch running with the ball. The "97" on the jersey is to indicate U.S. Highway 97, which travels directly through Redmond.

=== Oregon Arena Football History ===
The first team representing the state of Oregon in the original Arena Football League were the Portland Forest Dragons, who played from 1997 to 1999 before relocating to Oklahoma City and being rebranded as the Oklahoma Wranglers. Oregon would not see the AFL again until 2013 when the Portland Thunder were established by Clackamas billionaire Terry Emmert and would take the field a few months later. The Thunder were rebranded as the Portland Steel in 2016 after the league took control of the franchise from Emmert, then abruptly folded at season's end with no explanation. The second incarnation of the league would fold three years later. Both teams played their home games at the Moda Center.

=== American West Football Conference (2021-2024) ===
Originally the Oregon High Desert Storm from 2020 to 2024

On October 15, 2018, the American West Football Conference (AWFC) was founded by Chris Reynolds of Platinum Events & Security, LLC, the owners of the Idaho Horsemen and added the Wenatchee Valley Skyhawks, Reno Express, and Tri-Cities Fire to create the league.

The AWFC postponed the 2020 season due to the ongoing COVID-19 pandemic and then cancelled the season entirely due to the unavailability of arenas during the pandemic. The AWFC played the 2021 season, adding two teams in the Oregon High Desert Storm and Tri-City Rush, but the Skyhawks were unable to play any home games due to their home arena, the Town Toyota Center, being used for as a pandemic relief center and vaccination site. The Storm began play in 2021 at the First Interstate Bank Center at the Deschutes County Fairgrounds and Expo Center in Redmond.

In 2023, the Storm made it to American West Bowl IV to face the Idaho Horsemen after they defeated the Skyhawks 44–40 in the semi-final. However, they lost the championship to the Horsemen 42–20. Shortly afterward, the team's website and social media pages disappeared as the team and league suspended operations (Idaho joined the National Arena League, effectively shutting the league down because it owned the AWFC).

=== Hiatus ===
During the Storm's suspension of operations, the Oregon Blackbears played in a revival of the Arena Football League during the 2024 season. That team played four games (three at home at the Oregon State Fairgrounds Pavilion in Salem, and one on the road) before being taken off of the schedule for the remainder of the season, being ejected from that league, and eventually folding due to the team's ownership being entangled with a league management company that had been ousted midseason. The league itself would cease operations immediately after the season ended.

=== Relaunch as the Oregon Lightning ===
On October 22, 2024, Arena Football One announced the launch of the new Oregon Lightning. Chuck Jones, the former head coach of the now-defunct Blackbears and the Oregon High Desert Storm, part-owns the new team along with Sara Gumm and Jay Jenkins, two local business owners. A header on the Lightning's website identifies the team as "formerly known as the Oregon High Desert Storm". The change of brand was necessitated because of the existence of another AF1 team with the Storm name, the Southwest Kansas Storm, while the legal revival of the Oregon High Desert Storm allows the team to remain legally distinct from the Blackbears and the previous AFL's legal entanglements. In a recent interview with Shady Sports Network, Jones stated that the Lightning name was chosen in homage to the Portland Thunder, a team name used for Oregon-based franchises in both the previous Arena Football League and the World Football League.

Former Blackbears president Patrick Johnson, who had spearheaded the efforts to keep the Blackbears alive, served as a senior advisor to the Lightning until February 2025. Jones retained the Blackbears' coaching staff to serve as assistants for the Lightning. On November 18, 2024, the Lightning joined the league's West Division along with the Billings Outlaws and Washington Wolfpack (Potential opponents the Arizona Bandits went dormant for the season). The team is headquartered at a facility outside Eagle Crest Resort, dubbed "Lightning Ranch," where all the players reside.

The Lightning debuted March 15, 2025, in a 78–36 loss to the Billings Outlaws. Jones acknowledged the Lightning had a personnel disadvantage compared to some of AF1's powerhouse franchises, who had the resources to hire former National Football League talent, but pressed forward with the team as a long-term building project.

For the 2026 season, the Lightning acquired former Albany Firebirds backup quarterback Robert McCoy to serve as the team's new starting quarterback. On May 15th, the Lightning announced that former Portland State University quarterback John Charles has assumed head coaching duties from Chuck Jones, who remains co-owner/GM. The Lightning forfeited the remainder of their 2026 season on June 11, 2026; a statement from the team said that the team had suffered too many injuries to safely continue play. On June 16, Chuck Jones announced the team's official withdrawal from AF1 and that they were pursuing new opportunities with a new league. As of October 20, 2026, the team's soical media and website have become inactive.
