= Reno Barons =

American indoor football team

Logo

General information
- Founded: 2010
- Folded: 2011
- Headquartered: Reno, Nevada at Reno Events Center
- Colors: Dark Green, Tan, white
- RenoBarons.com

Personnel
- Owner: Cesare (Chez) Jennings
- General manager: Tim Pierce
- Head coach: James Terry

Team history
- Reno Barons (2011)

Home fields
- Reno Events Center (2011)

League / conference affiliations
- Independent (2011)

Playoff appearances (1)
- 2011

The Reno Barons were a professional indoor football team that began play in spring 2011. Based in Reno, Nevada, the Barons played their home games at the Reno Events Center.

== History ==
The Barons were founded by businessman Cesare (Chez) Jennings in 2010. Their name seems to be a play on Manfred von Richthofen (the World War I pilot colloquially known as The Red Baron), and a reference to the Reno Air Races in the nearby Reno Stead Airport (the Stead Air Force Base-decommissioned in the 1990s).

The team had a brief tumultuous which featured various personnel changes. Originally set to join the American Indoor Football Association in 2011, the AIFA lost too many teams to field a league that year, prompting two of the remaining three teams, Reno and the Stockton Wolves, to defect from the league, ensuring its demise. Reno and Stockton are playing a schedule comprising independent teams and each other, under the name "Western Indoor Football Association", though there is no record of a league ever existing. The team's first head coach in its brief history was Jarrod Rogol. However, he was quickly replaced by defensive coordinator Anthony Bartley (who would later became head coach of the Reno Express briefly in 2019, then co-owner/defensive coordinator for the Cedar Rapids River Kings briefly in 2024 and is now co-owner/head coach of the Iowa Power starting in 2025). One of the first players to be signed by the Barons was NAIA standout quarterback Philip Staback from Lindenwood University of St. Joseph, Missouri.

They played their first game on April 17, 2011, against a team from San Diego but instead faced the Tucson Trojans, winning 67-8. The team changed head coaches as Bartley left and James Terry took over and saw his team get a statement win against the Sacramento Warriors 113-23. As the season rolled on, the Barons began experiencing financial difficulties with current coach at the time Terry would not elaborate. However, after several bounced checks to players, coaches and staff, and a mjor social media blow-up, the team threatened to quit the team if the situation did not improve. Things did not improve and the team followed through on the threat, leaving the owner Chez Jennings no choice but to fold after the season ended without playing a championship game.

Despite the calamity with the Barons, indoor football would return to the area in the form of the Reno Express of the American West Football Conference in 2018. However, they, too, would succumb to financial strife and problems within that league, folding in 2019. Reno has not seen indoor football ever since.
