= Yakima Valley SunDome =

Arena in Yakima, Washington, US

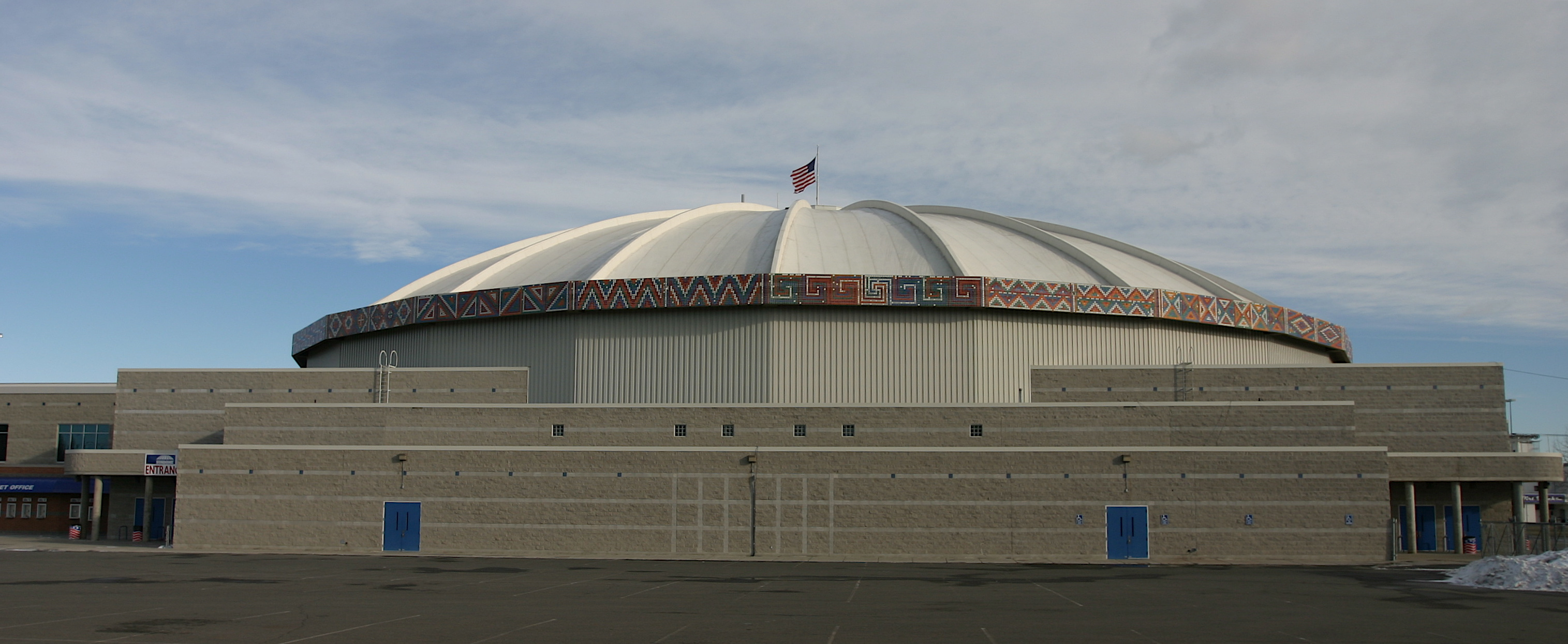
- Interactive map of Yakima Valley SunDome
- Location: 1301 South Fair Avenue; Yakima, Washington, U.S.
- Coordinates: 46°35′21″N 120°29′12″W
- Capacity: Basketball: 6,159; Boxing: 7,373; Concerts: 7,929–8,300; Rodeo: 4,870

Construction
- Opened: January 16, 1990

Tenants
- Yakima SunKings (CBA/TBL) (1990–2008, 2018–2019); Yakima Shockwave (NIFL) (2001); Yakima Valley Warriors (AIFA) (2010); Yakima Canines (AWFC) (2021)

The Yakima Valley SunDome is a 6,195-seat multi-purpose arena in Yakima, Washington, United States. Located on the Central Washington State Fairgrounds, it hosts sporting events, ice shows, horse shows, circuses, boxing and concerts, as well as trade shows and conventions. The stadium opened on January 16, 1990, and cost $14.8 million to construct. The building was designed by architecture firm Loofburrow & Associates.

The building features a 90-foot (27 m) dome and was the second in the world to use a concrete sectional roof design (24 segments), the first being Seattle's Kingdome. It has 56,000 square feet (5,200 m^{2}) of space and can accommodate two basketball courts laid end-to-end. The SunDome initially had 5,200 permanent seats with expanded capacity of up to 8,000 for concerts.

== History ==
The Yakima County government had been interested in building a multi-purpose sports and entertainment venue on the Central Washington State Fairgrounds since the 1970s and proposed a $15 million bond issue in 1980 to fund construction of a 14,000-seat indoor arena. The proposal, named "Centra", was rejected by voters in the November 1980 election. A second attempt in 1985 was approved using $6.8 million in state funding and matches from local governments.

The SunDome opened on January 16, 1990, and hosted its first event—a Kenny Rogers concert—that same day. The stadium's exterior was decorated in 1992 with a ring of 50,000 reflective tiles that comprise "Circle of Light", a public art installation designed by Richard C. Elliott; the ring's 24 sections include designs inspired by traditional Yakama baskets. A minor renovation in 2002 added additional seats and upgraded the existing locker rooms and meeting rooms for the facility. The roof was resurfaced in 2020.

== Tenants and events ==
The SunDome hosts several annual events, including the Washington Interscholastic Activities Association (WIAA)'s 1A and 2A high school basketball tournaments; WIAA B, BB, A, AA, AAA, & AAAA high school volleyball tournaments; and the WIAA Dance and Drill 2B, 1A, 2A & 3A state championships.

The stadium was the home of the Yakima Sun Kings, a Continental Basketball Association team, from 1990 to 2008; the team was later revived as the SunKings in the North American Premier Basketball from 2018 to 2019. The SunDome has also occasionally hosted indoor American football, including the Yakima Shockwave of the National Indoor Football League in 2001, the Yakima Valley Warriors of the American Indoor Football Association in 2010, and the Yakima Canines of the American West Football Conference in 2021.

On October 19, 2002, the Seattle SuperSonics played a National Basketball Association preseason game at the SunDome against the Denver Nuggets. The Sonics won 79–73 in front of 5,002 spectators.
