= Reno Events Center =

Multi-purpose arena

- The Events Center during a game

- Location in Nevada Location in the United States Location in North America
- Interactive map of Reno Events Center
- Address: 400 University Way
- Location: Reno, Nevada, U.S.
- Coordinates: 39.5309°N 119.8125°W
- Owner: Reno-Sparks Convention and Visitors Authority
- Capacity: 7,000

Construction
- Opened: January 2005; 21 years ago

Tenants
- Reno Bighorns (NBA G League) (2008–2018); Reno Barons (WIFA) (2011); Reno Express (AWFC) (2019)

Website
- Official website

The Reno Events Center is a 7,000-seat multi-purpose arena located in downtown Reno, Nevada that was constructed in January 2005.

It was the home to the Reno Bighorns of the NBA G League from 2008 to 2018 and to the Reno Barons of the Western Indoor Football Association during their short lived 2011 season.

Along with being a basketball and indoor football venue, it hosts boxing matches and concerts by a wide range of artists.

In 2012 and 2013, the Events Center hosted the NBA D-League Showcase, featuring all of the NBA Development League's teams over a four-day period in early January.

It has also hosted tour stops on the PBR's Built Ford Tough Series.

From 2016 to 2019, the arena hosted the Big Sky men's and women's basketball tournament.

In 2019, the arena was the home of the Reno Express of the new American West Football Conference.

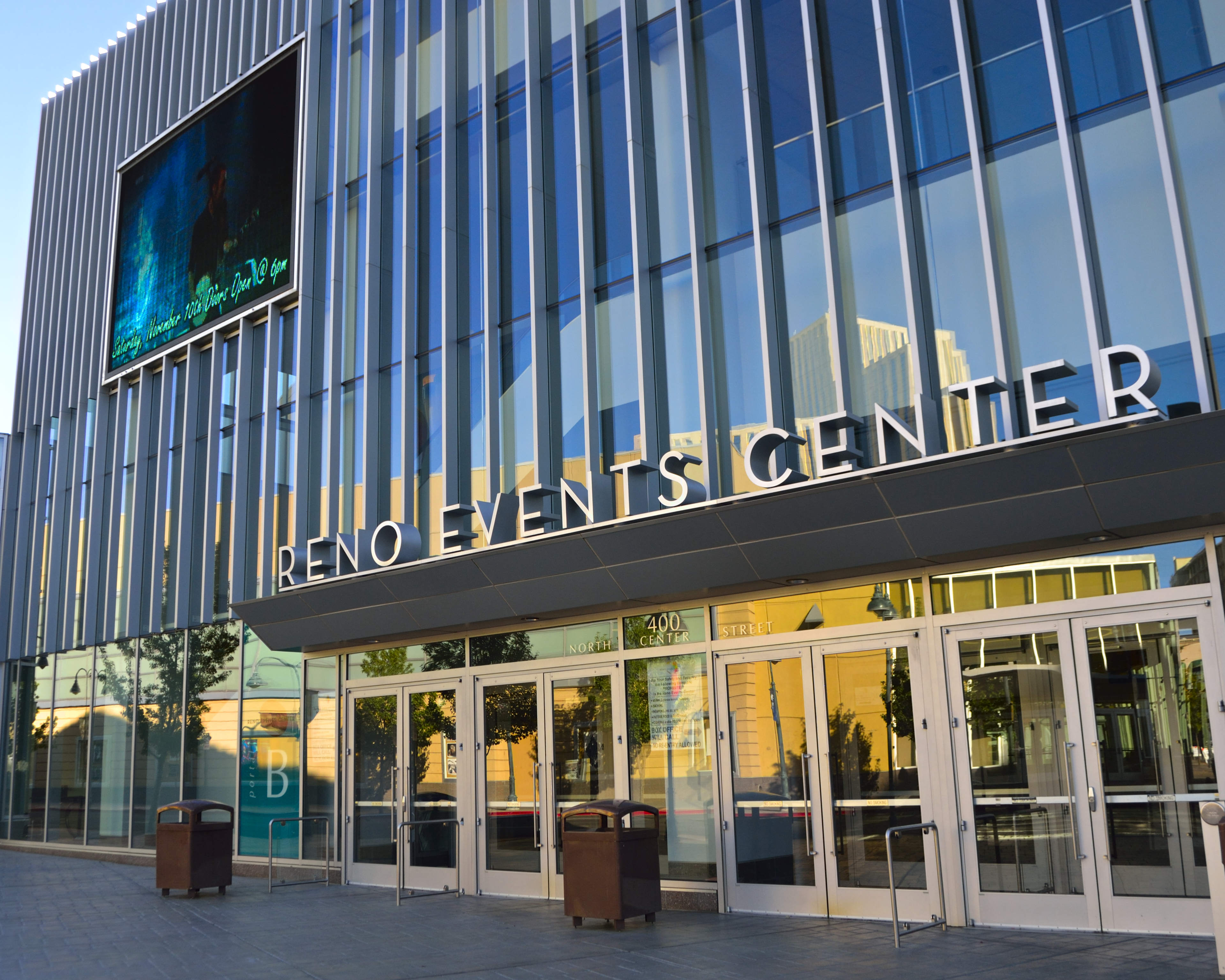
Reno Events Center
