= Tri-City Rush =

Indoor American football team (2021–2022)

Logo

General information
- Founded: 2021
- Folded: 2022
- Headquartered: Pasco, Washington at HAPO Center
- Colors: Black, red, silver, white
- Tri-Cty Rush.com

Personnel
- Owners: Rage Sports, LLC
- Head coach: Brandon Tate

Team history
- Tri-City Rush (2021-2022)

Home fields
- Toyota Center (2021-2022)

League / conference affiliations
- American West Football Conference (2021-2022)

Championships
- League championships: 2; 2 (2021, 2022)

Playoff appearances (0)
- 2

The Tri-City Rush were a professional indoor football team based out of Pasco, Washington, with home games at the HAPO Center during the 2021 and 2022 seasons. They were owned by Rage Sports, LLC, and were members of the American West Football Conference. They were the third arena/indoor team to play in the Tri-City region preceded by the Tri-Cities Fever of NIFL, af2 and the Indoor Football League and the Tri-Cities Fire of the AWFC. They folded in 2022 after playing two seasons and winning two league championships, citing financial difficulties.

== History ==
The Rush replaced the Tri-Cities Fire after that team folded due to financial difficulties resulting from the COVID-19 pandemic in 2020. The team played two seasons in 2021 and 2022 coached by owner Brandon Tate. They played their home game at the HAPO Center, a smaller arena than the Toyota Center, previously used by the Tri-Cities Fire and the Tri-Cities Fever before them. They won the AWFC's American West Bowl in the two seasons they competed. Unfortunately, due to not being able to secure funding to continue, the team folded in 2022. Tate would go on to be assistant coach of the Oregon Blackbears of the ill-fated revival of the Arena Football League in 2024 and the Oregon Lightning of Arena Football One in 2025.
