= Ford Idaho Center =

Sports complex in Nampa, Idaho

Coordinates: 43.608106°N 116.508175°W

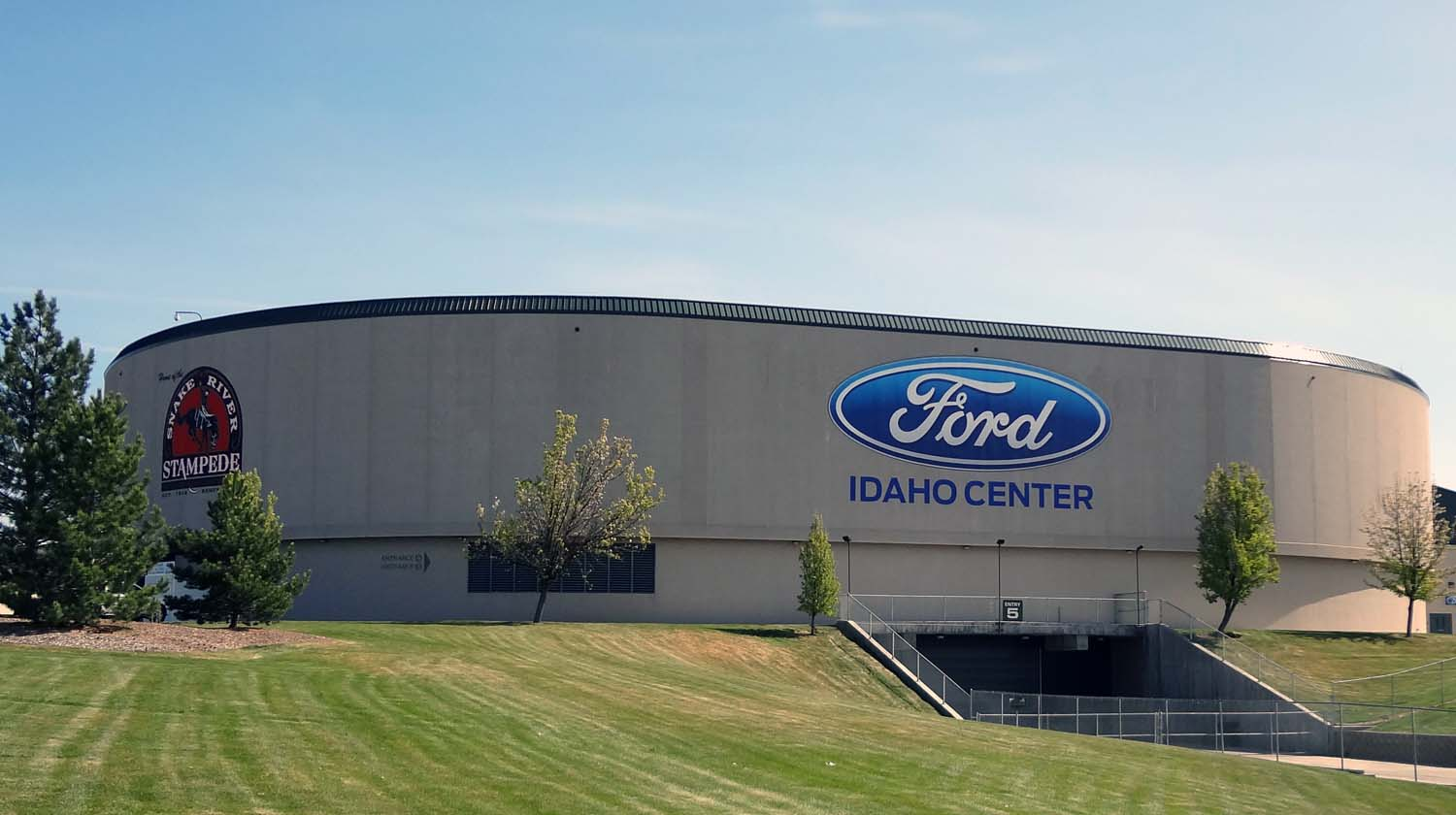
- Exterior of arena (c.2015)
- Interactive map of Ford Idaho Center
- Former names: Idaho Center (1997-2014)
- Address: 16200 Idaho Center Blvd; Nampa, ID 83687-5012
- Owner: City of Nampa
- Operator: Oak View Group
- Capacity: 12,279 (Ford Arena) 10,500 (Ford Amphitheater) 2,500 (Sports Center)

Construction
- Groundbreaking: August 23, 1996
- Opened: February 21, 1997
- Cost: $50 million ($109 million in 2025 dollars)

Tenants
- Snake River Stampede Rodeo (1997–present); Idaho Stampede (CBA) (1997–2006); God and Country Festival (2000–present); Idaho Horsemen (AWFC/NAL) (2019–2025)

Website
- Venue Website

The Ford Idaho Center is a complex of sports and entertainment venues in Nampa, Idaho, approximately 15 miles (24 km) west of Boise.

== About ==
The Ford Idaho Center is best known as Idaho's premier event complex. Ford Idaho Center consists of an Arena, Amphitheater, Horse Park, and Sports Center. Spanning nearly 100 acres the complex includes 104 RV spots supporting equine events. The Ford Idaho Center annually hosts the Snake River Stampede, considered one of the nation's top rodeos, during the third week in June. The Snake River Stampede moved indoors to the Ford Idaho Center Arena in 1997 after decades of being held in an outdoor stadium near Lakeview Park. Since then, the Stampede has grown into one of the nation’s top professional rodeos, drawing thousands of fans every June.

The Ford Idaho Center Arena hosts a wide variety of events, including concerts, trade shows, sporting competitions, and community gatherings. Over the years, the arena has welcomed major touring artists such as Garth Brooks, Carrie Underwood, Reba McEntire, Tim McGraw, and Snoop Dogg, alongside nationally touring shows and family entertainment. The venue is also a prominent hub for regional and national equine events, including Low Roller, the Idaho Horse Expo, and a variety of reining, roping, barrel racing, and youth and collegiate competitions. The arena was formerly home to the Idaho Stampede and the Continental Basketball Association from 1997 to 2006.

Today, the Ford Idaho Center Arena serves as a key venue for Idaho High School Activities Association (IHSAA) state tournaments, including boys and girls basketball championships, as well as state dance and cheer competitions.

== History ==
In March 2004, the Ford Idaho Center Arena was the home court for the Boise State men's basketball team for a second-round matchup in the NIT against the UWM Panthers. The game was moved to the Ford Idaho Center due to a prior scheduled Metallica concert at Boise State's Taco Bell Arena. The game drew a crowd of 10,153, the largest for a basketball game in the arena's history. BSU and Idaho played a non-conference basketball game at the arena on December 31, 2011; the Broncos won 76-73 before 7,540 spectators.

The basketball state tournament moved to the venue in 1998 from Northwest Nazarene University, and later became its long-term home in 2000 when NNU transitioned from the NAIA to NCAA Division II.

The amphitheater opened on June 15, 1998, with a concert by country music legend Shania Twain during her Come On Over Tour since then, it has held concerts by musicians such as Tim McGraw, Bob Dylan, Ben Harper, Jack Johnson and James Taylor.

The Ford Idaho Center Amphitheater built in 2002 has hosted music festivals, including the Vans Warped Tour, the Gigantour, the Lilith Fair, and the Mayhem Festival.

Pearl Jam performed during their Binaural Tour on November 3, 2000, with Supergrass as their opening act. The show was filmed and later released as a live album titled 11/3/00 – Boise, Idaho.

The Rolling Stones played their first concert in the state of Idaho at the arena during their A Bigger Bang Tour on Tuesday, November 14, 2006.

Since its opening, the Ford Idaho Center has been the Treasure Valley stop for PBR, Monster Jam, Arenacross, and more.

On January 14, 2014, the City of Nampa announced Ford as the new title sponsor for the Idaho Center. As part of the deal, Ford will pay the city $1 million over five years.

From 2019 to 2025, the Ford Idaho Center has been home to the Idaho Horsemen indoor football team, first in the American West Football Conference and beginning in 2024 in the National Arena League.

Iconic rock bands Blondie and Garbage teamed up for a joint tour and played the Ford Amphitheater on July 14, 2017, during the Rage and Rapture Tour. John Doe and Exene Cervenka served as supporting acts.

Seattle bands that have played the Ford venues include Heart in '03, Pearl Jam in 2000, Alice in Chains in '13, Foo Fighters in '17, and Death Cab for Cutie in '21.

== Venues ==
- Ford Idaho Center Arena: 12,279
- Ford Idaho Center Amphitheater: 10,500
- Ford Idaho Horse Park and Sports Center

Venues include an indoor arena opened in 1997 with a seating capacity of 12,279 and 31,200 square feet (2,900 m^{2}) of floor space and a 10,500-seat outdoor amphitheater opened in 1998 with a 60-by-40-foot stage. Additionally, the Ford Idaho Horse Park is used for equine events and the Ford Idaho Sports Center once utilized for indoor track and field events, including the home meets of the Boise State University Broncos track teams.

== See also ==
- List of contemporary amphitheatres
- List of music venues
