= Iowa Power =

American indoor football team

Logo

General information
- Founded: 2024
- Folded: 2025
- Headquartered: Five Flags Center in Dubuque, Iowa
- Colors: Purple, gold, black
- IowaPowerFootball.com

Personnel
- Owner: TBA
- Head coach: TBA

Team history
- Iowa Power (2025)

Home fields
- Five Flags Center (2025)

League / conference affiliations
- United Indoor Football Association (2025)

Playoff appearances (0)
- 0

The Iowa Power were an American professional indoor football team based in Dubuque, Iowa. They were originally set to play in Cedar Rapids, Iowa. The arena continued to work with the current team in the area. They were to play their home games at the Five Flags Center in Dubuque starting in 2025. Their website had announced that they had become members of the independent United Indoor Football Association, but the team has entered dormant status as they explore other opportunities. The first year of the Iowa Power led by team owner Anthony Bartley led to a successful season followed by controversy. Reports show players and staff did not receive payments for their services ultimately leading to the demise of the team.

== History ==
The Power came about as a result of a falling out between owners of the Cedar Rapids River Kings (formerly and currently of American Indoor Football) and Coralville Chaos. Anthony Bartley had shortly announced after the AIF's termination of the River Kings' membership that he would be bringing a new indoor team to Cedar Rapids called the Cedar Rapids Power and planned to play at the Alliant Energy PowerHouse. However, the arena continues its partnership with the River Kings and ordered Bartley to cease and desist in announcing any involvement with the arena. As a result, the team was renamed the Iowa Power and was looking for a home arena and a new league. On August 19, 2024, the Telegraph Herald reported that the Power was in negotiations with the Five Flags Center in Dubuque, Iowa, to play their home games at that facility. Shortly afterward the Power and the Five Flags Center came to an agreement to play in the arena starting in 2025. A press conference took place on April 8, 2025, put on by the city of Dubuque to welcome the Power to the arena and community.

Bartley has previous coached several professional indoor and outdoor teams in Nevada, most notably the Reno Barons of the American Indoor Football Association (later known as the AIF) and the Reno Express of the American West Football Conference. He also briefly coached with the Las Vegas Outlaws of the original Arena Football League.

John Guy has been involved in indoor football since 1987 and has worked with the original Arena League, the IFL, the World League and the PIFL. He worked in minor league sports for forty years and is a member of the American Football Association's Hall of Fame. He has placed several dozen players and coaches into professional contracts overseas.

In August 2024, the Power became members of the independent United Indoor Football Association, a fall league which features other teams such as the Ohio Legends, Ohio Boom, Michigan Avengerz, Wisconsin Aviators, Stateline Sting, Mad City Nightmare, Brownsville Chiefs, Kansas City Bombers and Virginia Legion.

On November 11, 2025, the Power's Facebook page accused owner/head coach Anthony Bartley of not paying his players and staff and left them all stranded in Dubuque which was completely false. The players were paid and the out of area players had been paid before anyone. He threatened legal action against an independent journalist who broke the story. Co-owner John Guy left the team oweing money and refused to pay his obligations after a home game played on August 16th. Bartley also claimed that team were the real champions of the UIFA. However, as of December 2025, the website and social media pages were taken down as it appears the franchise has gone dormant as they look to recover from all the money that was stolen and spent.

== Current roster ==
Iowa Power roster
Quarterbacks: -- Trey Robinson; -- Blake Bartz; Running backs: -- Anthony Smith; Wide receivers: -- TreA’vonii Page	Offensive linemen: -- Michael Hill; Defensive linemen: -- Trey Robinson; -- Malik Smith	Linebackers: Currently vacant; Defensive backs: -- Anthony Smith; Special teams: -- Mathew Soulis; -- Keenan Walton	Reserve lists: Currently vacant; Rookies in italics; Roster updated November 27, 2024; 9 Active, 0 Inactive

== Staff ==
Iowa Power staff
Front office: Owners – Anthony Bartley, Earl John Guy; President – Guy "Tiny" Lee; General manager – Brandon Henderson Sr; Assistant General Manager - Mark Mackerman II; Public Relations Director – Jared Bell; Sports Marketing Intern – Tate Glaspie; Announcer – Hugh Molony; Game Day Operations/Director of Football Operations-TBA; Sports Marketing Intern-Ashley Glennon; Community Relations Head- Jordan Knebel; Stats- Jesse Peoples; Dance Coach-Kaniyiah Mattison; Equipment Manager-TBA; Head coaches: Head coach – Anthony Bartley; Offensive coaches: Offensive coordinator – HC; Offensive coach – Colton Micheal; Offensive Assistant- Mark Mackerman II; Wide Receivers Coach- Demetrius Morrow; Line Coach- Tiny Lee	Defensive coaches: Defensive coordinator – Brandon Henderson Sr; LB Coach- TBA; Defensive Assistant- TBA; Defensive Analyst- Jesse Peoples
