= First Interstate Bank Center =

Indoor arena in Redmond, Oregon

- Interactive map of First Interstate Bank Center
- Former names: Hooker Creek Events Center; Bank of the Cascades Center
- Location: Deschutes County Fairgrounds, Redmond, Oregon
- Coordinates: 44°14′07″N 121°11′00″W
- Owner: Deschutes County Fair & Expo Center
- Capacity: 4,000

Construction
- Opened: 2000

Tenant
- Oregon Lightning (AF1) (2025–present)

Website
- Deschutes County Fair

First Interstate Bank Center is a 4,000-permanent seat indoor arena located in Redmond, Oregon, as part of the Deschutes County Expo Center. It is named for a regional bank which purchased naming rights to the arena's name. Originally, it was called the Bank of the Cascades Center, but that bank's acquisition by First Interstate BancSystem caused the change to the current name. Other seating capacities include 5,000 for basketball and up to 7,800 for concerts. It can also accommodate volleyball, motorsports, wrestling, indoor football (primarily the current Oregon Lightning AF1 team), conventions and trade shows. There is over 40,000 square feet of space on the arena floor with an additional 28,250 square feet on the arena concourse. Concession stands are placed on each end of the arena and ticket booths are located on each entrance.

== Three Sisters ==
Also located at the Deschutes County Expo Center is a conference center known as the Three Sisters. These three buildings have 33,736 square feet of total space. The largest is the Middle Sister, at 14,904 square feet, used for banquets, conferences and trade shows. It can accommodate 1,568 for smaller concerts. The other two buildings each have 9,416 square feet of space. A 5,000-square-foot kitchen is attached to all.

== High Desert Activity Center ==
High Desert Activity Center is a 12,684-square-foot exhibit hall used primarily for trade shows.
