= Oregon Blackbears =

American indoor football team

- Current season
Logo

General information
- Founded: 2023
- Folded: 2024
- Headquartered: Oregon State Fairgrounds Pavilion in Salem, Oregon
- Colors: Black, Gray, Red
- OregonBlackBears.com

Personnel
- Owners: Travelle Gaines; Arena Football Management, LLC (minority); Justin Butler (minority stake)
- Head coach: Chuck Jones
- President: Patrick Johnson

Team history
- Oregon Blackbears (2024)

Home fields
- Oregon State Fairgrounds Pavilion (2024)

League / conference affiliations
- Arena Football League (2024)

The Oregon Blackbears were a professional indoor football team based in Salem, Oregon. They were announced as one of the inaugural teams for the revived Arena Football League (AFL), beginning play in 2024. They played at the Oregon State Fairgrounds Pavilion in Salem. The Blackbears spent much of its existence in a state of uncertainty after a league reorganization early in the 2024 season, having twice been removed from, then restored to the league, as original owner and original league president Travelle Gaines was ousted from the league midseason and never sold the team to an ownership group that had agreed to take over the team's operations and allow it to continue.

== History ==
The Blackbears were the third official Oregon-based team to play in the Arena Football League, but were the first to play outside of the Portland, Oregon, area. They were also the first "major" sports team based in Salem.

=== Oregon AFL History ===
Initial Logo (2023)

The first team representing the state of Oregon in the Arena Football League were the Portland Forest Dragons, who played from 1997 to 1999 before relocating to Oklahoma City and being rebranded as the Oklahoma Wranglers. Oregon would not see the AFL again until 2013 when the Portland Thunder were established by Clackamas billionaire Terry Emmert and would take the field a few months later. The Thunder were rebranded as the Portland Steel in 2016 after the league took control of the franchise from Emmert, then abruptly folded at season's end with no explanation. The second incarnation of the league would fold three years later. Both teams played their home games at the Moda Center.

=== Birth of the Blackbears ===
Four years after the original AFL folded for the second time, it was announced on February 1, 2023 that the league intended on relaunching in 2024. On July 18, the 16 intended market cities were announced, including Salem. Like some other locations, Salem city officials were surprised about the announcement, but stated that they "look forward to learning more".

On October 25, 2023, a press release announced that the team would be called the Oregon Blackbears. The ownership group was announced to have been led by former Oregon Ducks standout and current New York Giants linebacker Kayvon Thibodeaux and that their head coach is former player Chuck Jones, who had spent the previous season with the Oregon High Desert Storm. In a statement to Arena Insider, Thibodeaux stated that he was never an owner of the team and that "(t)he league used my name for publicity.". Travelle Gaines, who served as league president under commissioner Lee Hutton, was the listed majority owner of the team, through a limited liability company, with the league holding an additional minority stake. Before the start of the 2024 season, Patrick Johnson was named the team president. Their main rivals in the new AFL were the Washington Wolfpack and Billings Outlaws.

On April 27, 2024, the Blackbears won the debut at home over the Wolfpack 47-40.

==== League turmoil ====
With the ouster of commissioner Lee Hutton on May 14, 2024, the Blackbears were initially left out of the reorganized ten-team league. League officials expressed openness to continuing to schedule games against the Blackbears. In a statement, Johnson expressed surprise that his organization had not been involved in the decision and that he would accept the ruling and disband the team, beginning negotiations with other leagues to ensure Blackbears players could finish the season elsewhere. In a statement to the Statesman-Journal, he indicated plans to discuss the team's exclusion with the other ten remaining owners before taking any further action. As of May 16, the Blackbears are still scheduled to play the Washington Wolfpack on May 18. filling a schedule hole left when the Rapid City Marshals, one of the ten surviving teams, cancelled an upcoming game amid in-team turmoil that had forced the sudden forfeiture of that team's previous game. The Blackbears announced an agreement to finish the 2024 season on May 17 after a local ownership group was found to cover the league's shares in the team; ultimately, Gaines and Hutton never sold their stakes, and the entanglement of these "legal relationships" ultimately prevented the team from returning to the field.

==== Franchise turmoil ====
After declining a Week 5 reassignment to play the Southwest Kansas Storm in place of the Billings Outlaws "due to unforeseen circumstances," the Blackbears were briefly removed from the Arena Football League's list of teams on May 27 without their knowledge before being restored later that day. On May 28, 2024, coinciding with the naming of new league president/chief operating officer Jared Widman, the league officially removed the team from the remainder of the 2024 season schedule. The team continued to negotiate with the league while also exploring other options and the team announced the renewal of its contract with HUMBL (which had been the AFL's online platform under Hutton) for ticket sales for "any future home games." On June 17, after the team was unable to find opponents for their two remaining scheduled home games, the Blackbears formally concluded their season, finishing 3-1 in their inaugural season. Gaines and Hutton left rent bills of $30,000 unpaid for the three games held at the fairgrounds.

Attempts to reach team officials went unanswered in early September, and the team did not make any social media posts after June 17.

=== Replacement ===
Team president Patrick Johnson and head coach Chuck Jones joined the staff of the Oregon Lightning, a successor franchise in Arena Football One that plays in Redmond, Oregon. The Lightning were established as a new franchise, legally the successor to the former Oregon High Desert Storm of the American West Football Conference, to sever any remaining ties to Hutton and Gaines. Jones is a co-owner of the Lightning in addition to his head coach role, while Johnson is a senior advisor to the team.
