= Central Washington State Fair =

State fair in Yakima, Washington

Coordinates: 46°35′24″N 120°29′09″W

- Genre: State fair
- Locations: Yakima, Washington
- Years active: 1892–1916, 1919–1923, 1925–1929, 1932–1936, 1939–1941, 1946–2019, 2021–
- Attendance: 304,000 (2012)
- Website: http://fairfun.com/

The Central Washington State Fair is a state fair in Yakima County, Washington, United States held annually in September. The fair is held in Yakima, Washington at the State Fair Park. The fair was first held in 1892.

== History ==
In 1892 the first fair was held in Yakima when a group of businessmen assumed the responsibility of putting on a fair in a downtown building.

Previous to this time the entire State of Washington, for a period of two years, had been in an uproar trying to decide on the location of the state capital. On February 16, 1892, the legislature made its decision and Yakima received the nod for the state fair and Olympia retained the title of Capital City. The bill creating the State Agricultural Fair was passed on March 2, 1893, and $10,000 was set aside for work on the buildings. One hundred and twenty acres of land was purchased and by September 24, 1894, the following buildings had been erected: A grandstand large enough to seat 2,000 people, a racetrack, a mile track, an exhibit hall, 100 horse stalls, and a judges stand that was three stories high.

Agricultural exhibits started pouring in from all over the state, as well as livestock exhibits. They held Indian races, war dances, coyote hunts, harness races, and horse races. This type of fair continued and around 1915 the automobile was attracting a great deal of attention and many were on display at the Auto Show which was one of the main attractions. But horse racing, fruits and agriculture, and livestock still kept a predominant position in the fair.

From 1925 to 1929, harness races, horse races, and automobile races were grandstand attractions. Fireworks displays were popular for the night shows. Free acts were brought in to fill in the lull between the horse races.

No fair was held in 1930 or 1931 due to the legislature's refusal to approve an operating budget, and the Great Depression. The fair was held from 1932 through 1936 but these were not considered a success. Therefore, the legislature abolished the State Fair and none were held in 1937 or 1938.

April 13, 1939, a group of 45 persons representing agriculture, livestock breeders, and business, met to discuss the possibility of holding a fair in Yakima. The State Fairgrounds were available as they had had little use since 1936 and this group of people tentatively decided to hold a fair that year. One week later the group met again and voted to hold a fair on September 28, 29, and 30 to be held in conjunction with the State 4-H Fair which owned a corner piece of property on the State Fairgrounds. This group of people had no funds. They chose the name Central Washington Fair Association. Eight men contributed $5.00 each to pay for the incorporation papers. The fair was organized and incorporated for the purpose of promoting livestock and agricultural industry in Washington. It was agreed that seven persons should be elected to the board of directors to operate the fair and that stock should be sold at $5.00 per share to raise funds. Regardless of how many shares any corporation or individual bought, no one person or group of persons would be allowed more than one vote at the annual stockholders' meeting nor could they be assessed or receive dividends from their stock.

The members of the board of directors that were elected represented the livestock industry, agriculture, Granges, and men that had been connected with 4-H work in their youth. The 1939 fair was a big success and at its conclusion the board of directors and stockholders voted to again hold a fair in 1940. In 1940 and 1941 the fair was held for a four-day period and were both very successful. In July 1942 the governor asked that all fairs in the state be cancelled because of World War II. This continued through 1945.

Within three days of V-J Day, August 14, 1945, the board of directors met and work was immediately begun on plans for a fair in 1946. From 1946 until 1976, the fair was an annual five-day event. In 1977, to accommodate the ever-growing crowds, the board decided to expand the fair to a nine-day event. This continued until 1996 when a second Sunday was added, making it a ten-day Fair (Friday through Sunday).

Attendance at the annual fair has continued on an upward trend: In the 1920s and 1930s, it averaged 50,000; in the 1940s and 1950s, the average was 75,000; in the 1960s, attendance averaged 150,000+ with 1969 showing the first attendance over 200,000 (204,061). The upward trend has continued through to the present – 1983 attendance was 324,481 (first year over 300,000).

Since the first fair was held in 1892, throughout its history, when the Central Washington Fair Association was incorporated in 1939, and continuing to this day, the purpose of the association has remained steadfast – to hold an annual fair and to promote and develop agriculture. As spelled out in its 1939 Articles of Incorporation filed with the Secretary of State's office:

The object and purpose for which this Association is formed is:

1. For the purpose of promoting, developing, and cultivating an interest in Agriculture and Horticulture in Central Washington.
2. To provide for a Central Washington Fair to be held in Yakima, Washington.
3. To stimulate the interest in boys and girls in farming and farming activities and to provide an opportunity for them to exhibit farm products.
4. To stimulate an interest in farming activities with citizens of the State of Washington regardless of age.

2020 saw the COVID-19 pandemic as grounds for cancellation.

== Facilities ==
The Horticulture Building, more commonly known as the Ag Building, is the oldest standing structure on the fairgrounds. The building was dedicated in 1907 and was built at a cost of $15,000. According to experts Michael Sullivan and Eugenia Woo, the building was actually built in 1895. According to a dedication marker, the building was designed by architect Julius Zittel, however some historians argue that the Beaux-Arts style structure was actually designed by Yakima architect William de Veaux.

The grounds of the Central Washington State Fair are home to the Yakima SunDome, a 6,195 seat multi-purpose arena built in 1990.
