= Five Flags Center =

- Orpheum Theatre and Site
- U.S. National Register of Historic Places
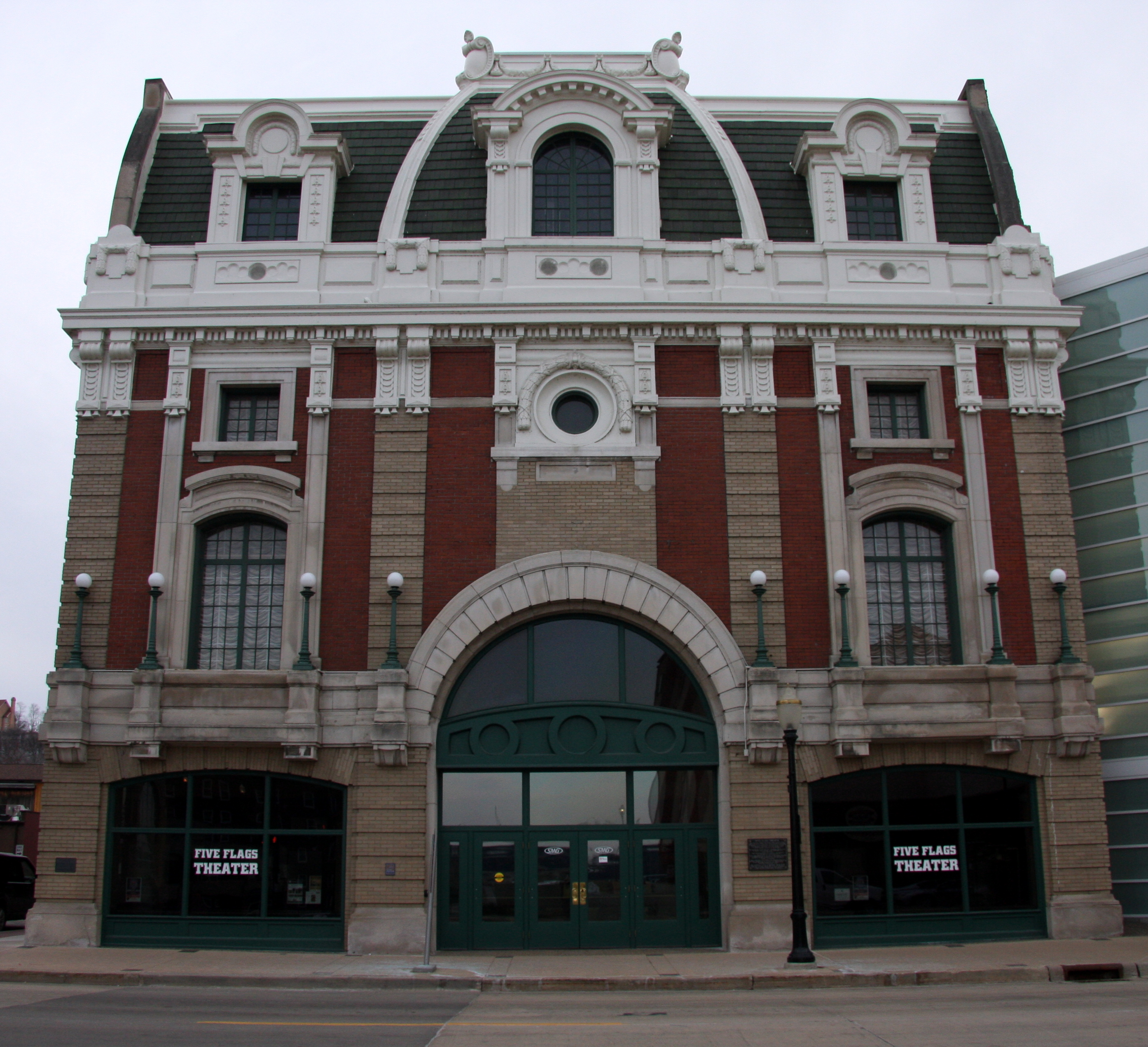

- Location within Iowa Location within the United States
- Location: 405 Main St. Dubuque, Iowa
- Coordinates: 42°29′52″N 90°39′55″W
- Built: 1910
- Architect: Rapp and Rapp
- NRHP reference No.: 72000474
- Added to NRHP: November 14, 1972

Five Flags Center is a multi-purpose facility in downtown Dubuque, Iowa. It is named for the five flags that have flown over Dubuque; the Royal French Flag (1673–1763), the Royal Flag of Spain (1763–1803), the Union Jack of Great Britain (1780, during a brief interruption of Spanish rule), the flag of the French Republic (1803), and the flag of the United States (1803–Present).

== History ==
The site's first theater was the Athenaeum Theater, built in 1840, which became the City Hotel (also a theater) in 1846 and later the Peosta House.

A second theatre was originally built in 1864 or 1877, but then was destroyed by fire in 1910. It had been purchased then renovated during 1909-1910 by local prominent businessman Harker Brentnal Spensley Sr. and his partner, C. H. Eighmey.

The current Great Five Flags Theater was constructed as the Majestic Theater in 1910. The rebuilt theater was designed by George L. Rapp, who eventually became one of the nation's premier theater architects. It was converted to a movie house in 1920 and renamed 'Spensley Theater' in 1929. Constructed in a Renaissance Revival style with French influences, it was later renamed the RKO Orpheum and used to show movies. Eventually, it fell into disrepair and was slated for demolition during urban renewal in 1969.

A committee made up of concerned citizens began a fund drive to save the theater, which was incorporated in the Five Flags Center project in 1972. Restoration was begun in 1975, and the theater was reopened in 1976 as the Five Flags Theater. It is currently the home of the Dubuque Symphony Orchestra, high school musicals, and occasional concerts and ballet productions.

== Arena ==
Five Flags Arena was conceived as part of a project to rehabilitate the Five Flags Theater. Construction began in 1976, and the facility opened in 1979. The first event was a concert by Bob Hope.

The arena can seat up to 5,200 for basketball, although in its former primary use, ice hockey, actual seating capacity is only about 2,500.

It features one side of permanent seating; the other three sides are bleachers, some for Loras College basketball, and most of Dubuque's major concerts.

High school graduation ceremonies for Hempstead High School and Senior High School have been held at the center.

The Five Flags Center was formerly the main convention center in Dubuque, but construction of the Grand River Event Center in 2003, moved many events away from Five Flags.

It was also the former home of the Dubuque Fighting Saints (1980-2001) of the United States Hockey League from 1980–2001 and the home of the Dubuque Thunderbirds hockey team of the Central States Hockey League from 2001–2010.

Dubuque opened a new Ice Arena, the Mystique Ice Center, which opened in Fall of 2010, and now hosts the expansion Dubuque Fighting Saints.

SMG took over operations of the arena in 2004, which were formerly handled by the City of Dubuque.

In 2005, the arena was closed during the summer for concession, entrance, and concourse renovation.

The Iowa Power, an indoor football team, started negotiations to play at the arena in August 2024. They will begin play in 2025 at the arena.
