= Tri-City Horsemen =

American indoor football team

- Current season
Logo

General information
- Founded: 2018
- Headquartered: Kearney, Nebraska
- Colors: Royal blue, grey, black, white
- Mascot: Tucker
- GoHorsemen.com

Personnel
- Owners: Platinum Events & Security LLC
- General manager: Chris Reynolds
- Head coach: Chris Reynolds
- President: Chris Reynolds

Team history
- Idaho Horsemen (2019–2025); Tri-City Horsemen (2027–present)

Home fields
- Ford Idaho Center (2019–2025); Viaero Center (2027–future)

League / conference affiliations
- American West Football Conference (2019–2023); National Arena League (2024–2025); American Arena League (2027–)

Championships
- League championships: 2: AWFC: 2019, 2023

Playoff appearances (4)
- AWFC: 2019, 2021, 2022, 2023

The Tri-City Horsemen are a professional indoor football team currently based out of Kearney, Nebraska. They were founded as the Idaho Horsemen in 2018 and played their home games at the Ford Idaho Center from 2019 to 2025. They are owned by Chris Reynolds from Platinum Events & Security LLC. In 2019, the team owners founded the American West Football Conference. They joined the National Arena League before the 2024 season. They have since relocated to Kearney, Nebraska, and will begin played at Viaero Center in Kearney starting in 2027.

== History ==
Idaho Horsemen logo (2019-2025)

The Horsemen were first announced by owner Chris Reynolds in late 2017, with the expressed interest in joining either the Indoor Football League or Champions Indoor Football. However, due to instability with both leagues, Reynolds took a "wait-and-see approach" before making a decision with the intent to start play in 2019.

On October 15, 2018, the Horsemen announced that they had started their own league, the American West Football Conference, and added three other teams to the league, the Reno Express, the Tri-Cities Fire, and Wenatchee Valley Skyhawks.

On March 23, 2019, the Idaho Horsemen played their first game at the Ford Idaho Center in front of 2054 spectators against the Wenatchee Valley Skyhawks. The Horsemen scored on their first drive in five plays on a run by quarterback Hayden Wright. The Horsemen went on to win 33–22. The Horsemen went undefeated in their first season at 12–0 and earned the right to host the AWFC championship game. They defeated the Reno Express 40–20 to win the league championship.

Prior to the planned start of the 2020 AWFC season, the Tri-Cities Fire folded leading to the Horsemen announcing they would play an independent schedule. The league then tried to move forward with three teams — Idaho, Wenatchee, and the expansion Yakima Canines — following the withdrawal of the Reno Express from the league with non-league teams filling for the newly vacant dates. The AWFC then postponed the 2020 season due to the ongoing COVID-19 pandemic and then cancelled the season entirely due to the unavailability of arenas during the pandemic.

After winning the 2023 AWFC championship, the Horsemen were announced as joining the National Arena League (NAL) for the 2024 season.

After the 2025 season, the Horsemen announced that they would not return to the Ford Idaho Center for 2026, but have made it clear they will stay in the league as they search for a new home outside of Idaho. In a September 19, 2025, press release from the NAL, the Horsemen were announced to be going dormant for 2026 and indications are that the team will be relocating to Arizona.

On July 13, 2026, the Horsemen announced their moved to Kearney, Nebraska, and were rebranded the Tri-City Horsemen and will play at the Viaero Center beginning in the 2027 season, marking the first time since 2004 when the Tri-City Diesel played in the National Indoor Football League from 2001 to 2004. On August 10, the team leaked that they would join the American Arena League for the 2027 season.

== Season-by-season records ==
League champions	Playoff berth	League leader

Season	League	Regular season			Postseason results
Season	League	Finish	Wins	Losses	Postseason results
2019	AWFC	1st	12	0	Won American West Bowl I (Reno) 40–20
2020	AWFC	Season canceled due to the COVID-19 pandemic			
2021	AWFC	3rd	6	4	Won Semifinal (Oregon) 55–37; Lost American West Bowl II (Tri-City) 27–36
2022	AWFC	2nd	6	3	Lost Semifinal (Wenatchee) 80–70
2023	AWFC	1st (Note: Only counting the four league games; the Horsemen also had four wins over non-league teams.)	3	1	Won American West Bowl IV (Oregon) 42–20
2024	NAL		1	7	
Total			29	15	All-time regular season record
Total			3	2	All-time postseason record
Total			32	17	All-time regular season and postseason record

== Head coaches ==
Name	Tenure	Regular season			Playoffs		Awards
Name	Tenure	W	L	Win%	W	L	Awards
Chris Reynolds	2019–present	38	16	.704	3	2	
