= Town Toyota Center =

Arena in Wenatchee, Washington

Coordinates: 47.442326°N 120.3217185°W

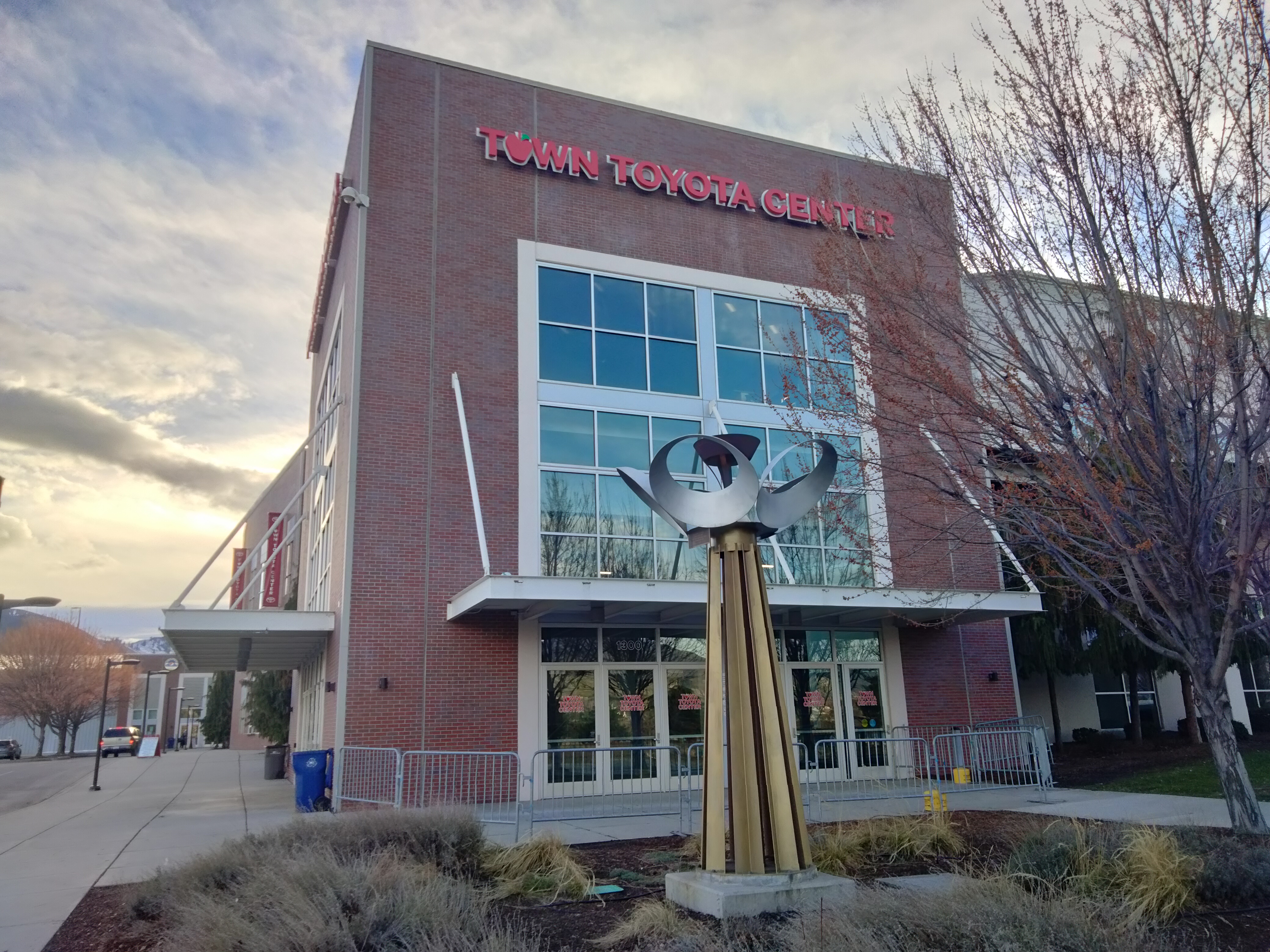
- Interactive map of Town Toyota Center
- Former names: Greater Wenatchee Regional Event Center (2007–2008); Town Toyota Arena (2008)
- Location: 1300 Walla Walla Avenue; Wenatchee, Washington; 98802
- Owner: Wenatchee PFD
- Operator: Wenatchee PFD
- Capacity: Basketball: 5,000; Ice hockey/Arena football: 4,300; Concert: 5,800

Construction
- Groundbreaking: September 12, 2006
- Opened: October 5, 2008
- Cost: $52.8 million ($79 million in 2025 dollars)
- Architect: Sink Combs Dethlefs
- Project manager: International Coliseums Company
- Structural engineer: Martin/Martin Consulting Engineers
- Services engineer: M-E Engineers. Inc.
- General contractor: Hunt Construction Group

Tenants
- Wenatchee Wild (NAHL/BCHL) (2008–2023); Wenatchee Valley Skyhawks (AWFC) (2019–2023); Wenatchee Wild (WHL) (2023–present); Wenatchee Bighorns (TBL) (2023–2025); Wenatchee Wolves (NPHL) (2014–2016); Wenatchee Valley Venom (AIFA/IFL) (2010–2011)

Town Toyota Center is a 4,300-seat multi-purpose arena in Wenatchee, Washington. The arena was built and is owned and managed by the Wenatchee Public Facilities District (PFD). It is the home venue of the Wenatchee Wild, an ice hockey team in the Western Hockey League. It was formerly home to the Wenatchee Wolves, the Wenatchee Valley Venom, the Wenatchee Valley Skyhawks, an arena football team, and the Wenatchee Bighorns, a semi-professional basketball team.

During planning and early construction, the arena was known as the Greater Wenatchee Regional Events Center, but in August 2008, a local auto dealer bought the naming rights of the arena for an undisclosed amount, giving the arena its current name.

== Default ==
In 2006, nine local cities and counties formed a municipal corporation then called the Greater Wenatchee Regional Events Center Public Facilities District to fund the Town Toyota Center. The arena went into default on December 1, 2011, when the PFD missed a payment on short term bond anticipation notes. The district was later fined by the Securities and Exchange Commission for misleading investors. It was the first time that the SEC assessed a financial penalty against a municipal issuer. The district settled with the SEC for $20,000. In 2012, legislation was passed and signed by Governor Christine Gregoire to authorize a local sales tax increase to refinance the debt. The default was the largest public default in Washington State since the WPPSS disaster of 1982 that defaulted on $2.25 billion in bonds. In the fine, the SEC also named the developer Global Entertainment and its then-president and CEO Richard Kozuback, the bankers, and a staff finance manager.

== Notable events ==
- High School Musical: The Ice Tour – October 29-November 2, 2008
- Newsboys – March 26, 2009
- Tech N9ne – April 26, 2010 and November 2, 2011
- Backstreet Boys "This Is Us" Tour – August 4, 2010
- Paul Wall, Slim Thug, Ying Yang Twins, and Neema – May 6, 2011
- Bill Engvall – July 31, 2011
- Amy Grant & Michael W. Smith 2 Friends Tour – September 15, 2011
- B. B. King – November 16, 2011
- Ron White – November 20, 2011
- Mannheim Steamroller – December 20, 2011 and November 26, 2023
- Styx – February 1, 2012
- Stars On Ice – February 27, 2012 and May 16, 2014
- Harlem Globetrotters – February 16, 2011 and February 27, 2012, February 19, 2014, and June 16, 2024
- Michael Londra's Beyond Celtic – March 15, 2012
- Kelly Clarkson – April 13, 2012
- TNA Live! – April 28, 2012
- Sesame Street LIVE!: Elmo Makes Music – May 15–16, 2012
- Joan Sebastian – August 30, 2013
- Larry the Cable Guy – January 15, 2014
- Chicago – March 18, 2014
- Gloria Trevi – April 18, 2014, with Carlito Olivero
- Marco Antonio Solis – August 30, 2015

== See also ==
- List of sports venues with the name Toyota
