= Patrick Johnson (wide receiver) =

American football player (born 1976)

No. 85, 83, 84, 11
- Position: Wide receiver

Personal information
- Born: August 10, 1976 (age 50); Gainesville, Georgia, U.S.
- Listed height: 5 ft 10 in (1.78 m)
- Listed weight: 196 lb (89 kg)

Career information
- High school: Redlands (CA)
- College: Oregon
- NFL draft: 1998: 2nd round, 42nd overall pick

Career history
- Baltimore Ravens (1998–2001); Jacksonville Jaguars (2002); Washington Redskins (2003); Cincinnati Bengals (2004)*; Baltimore Ravens (2004–2005); Edmonton Eskimos (2007)*; Toronto Argonauts (2007)
- * Offseason or practice squad member only

Awards and highlights
- Super Bowl champion (XXXV); Second-team All-Pac-10 (1997)

Career NFL statistics
- Receptions: 84
- Receiving yards: 1,286
- Receiving touchdowns: 10
- Stats at Pro Football Reference

Patrick Jevon Johnson (born August 10, 1976) is an American former professional football player who was a wide receiver in the National Football League (NFL).

Johnson majored in Journalism and Communications at the University of Oregon from 1994 to 1997, and attended the Craig James Broadcast School in 2000. Mr. Johnson was a two-sport athlete at the University of Oregon, excelling in both football and track, and winning numerous awards and championships during his collegiate athletic career.

A two-sport athlete, Johnson was an Olympic-caliber sprinter before beginning his NFL career.

== Early life ==
As a senior at Redlands High School in Redlands California, Johnson was All- Citrus Belt League, Honorable Mention All CIF, a member of the Tacoma News Tribune's Western top 100 list, and team MVP in his only year of playing running back for the Terriers. On the track as a junior, Johnson managed to finish fourth place in the 200-meter final at the California State Track and Field Championships. During his senior campaign, Johnson had over 1000 all-purpose yards as the starting halfback for the Terriers, and was amongst the nation's elite prep sprinters. Johnson led all national preps in both the 100 and 200 meters for most of the season. Johnson also notched impressive wins at the prestigious prep track and field meets, the Arcadia Invitational (100m), Golden West Invitational (100, 200m) and the National Scholastic Outdoor Championships (200m). Later that summer, Johnson represented the United States in the 4 × 100 m relay at the 1994 World Junior Championships in Athletics in Lisbon, Portugal, garnering a silver medal in the games.

Even though Johnson had signed a letter of intent to play college football at the University of Oregon, he was faced with the tough decision of turning pro in track as a recently graduated high school senior. Doing so would have required him to forfeit all of his collegiate eligibility. Transferring to a football powerhouse, (Oregon was not at the time) or transferring to a collegiate sprinting powerhouse were other alternatives to consider for Johnson, but would have required forfeiting a year of eligibility if he chose that direction. The Ducks track and field brass was only lukewarm at best to the possibility of Johnson participating in track and field while at the University of Oregon, but that quickly changed halfway into his senior track campaign as his times drastically improved from the year before. Johnson nearly relinquished his letter of intent to Oregon, but Johnson elected to continue with his plans to go based on his parents' plea for him to stay his course.

== College career ==
Johnson attended the University of Oregon, where he was a member of both the football and track teams.

As a collegiate sprinter at Oregon, he was one of the top sprinters in the nation, defeating the legendary Carl Lewis in a 100 m race at the Drake Relays and winning the Pac-10 Championships in the 400 m as a freshman. Johnson was also a two-time NCAA All-America in the 100–200 meters in his only full season of competition on the track. Johnson was the pre-season favorite to win the NCAA 400m in his sophomore season and the preseason pick to make the Olympic team that summer in 1996. Due to over-training early in the season, Johnson unfortunately had to watch the NCAA Championships from the grandstands that season from his home track, historic Hayward Field. Johnson, respectively, lost his defense of the Pac-10 400-meter title in 1996, placing second, and ran the race at 80%. Citing the emotional toll of 1996 and the disappointment of missing the Olympics in his home state of Georgia, Johnson quit the team and never stepped on the track again for the Ducks.

Johnson played as a wingback and halfback in high school but was converted to wide receiver at the University of Oregon. He was part of arguably the most important era in the rebuilding and rise of the Oregon football program (1994–1997). Johnson managed to start in eight games during Oregon's 1994 Rose Bowl run, setting a then-freshman record with 30 receptions, which has since been broken. The Ducks also appeared in the Cotton and Las Vegas Bowls, respectively, with Johnson earning offensive MVP honors in the latter's dominant victory over the Air Force Academy.

Johnson was a second-team All-Pac-10 wide receiver, as well as an All-American return specialist during his college career. Johnson credits much of his development as a wide receiver to the early guidance of former Oregon standout wide receiver Cristin McLemore.

== Professional career ==
In 1998, Johnson was the 42nd overall draft pick for the Baltimore Ravens. He later earned a Super Bowl ring when the Ravens won Super Bowl XXXV. After four seasons with the Ravens, Johnson played one season with the Jacksonville Jaguars, followed by a season with the Washington Redskins, and a brief stint with the Cincinnati Bengals that was cut short by a major hand injury suffered during a 2004 preseason game against the Atlanta Falcons. Johnson signed an injury settlement with the Bengals in 2004, waived his roster spot, and returned to his Irving, Texas, home to recover. Later that same season, Johnson re-signed with the Baltimore Ravens but was released to make room for former Pittsburgh Steelers quarterback Kordell Stewart. In 2005, Johnson rejoined the Ravens for another season.

Johnson first joined the CFL in May 2007 when he signed with the Edmonton Eskimos. He was later traded to the Toronto Argonauts on June 13, 2007, in exchange for a second-round pick in the 2008 CFL Canadian Draft.

On June 20, 2008, Johnson was released by the Toronto Argonauts following two preseason contests in order to sign David Boston.

== Business and Philanthropy ==
Johnson has helped several charities and non-profit organizations through volunteering and fundraising. Johnson collected 20,000 books for the program "Baltimore Reads" Books for Kids Day, and guest modeled for Tommy Hilfiger's fundraiser for the Living Classrooms Organization while playing for the Baltimore Ravens, respectively. In 2003, Mr. Johnson interned with GOPAC while playing for the Washington Redskins, then chaired by former congressman and standout quarterback J.C. Watts. GOPAC (Link to site) is a political action committee aimed at training candidates for grassroots campaigning.

Johnson has accepted several keynote speaking engagements, most notably the Pigskin Preview organized by Virginia Governor Bob McDonnell. He is also a published writer, having co-authored an article for Worth and written independently for Overtime Magazines. Johnson has provided consulting in the private equity, oil and gas, mining, gaming, nutraceutical, entertainment, internet, and real estate industries.

On February 16, 2018, three Johnson-controlled business entities—PDX Partners, Victura Construction Group, and Cherubim Interests—had their trading halted as the Securities and Exchange Commission (SEC) launched an investigation into alleged investments in cryptocurrencies and blockchain technology. The SEC questioned the accuracy of the information provided by the companies regarding these investments.

The Patrick Johnson Foundation was launched in 2003 and served as a national Philanthropic and programmatic not-for-profit organization.

In 2024, Johnson was named president of the Oregon Blackbears of the Arena Football League. Johnson led the Blackbears' efforts to remain operational after the league's reorganization removed the original owners. Months later, Johnson became a special advisor to the Oregon Lightning of Arena Football One, the franchise co-owned, managed, and coached by former Blackbears coach Chuck Jones. Between the Blackbears' dissolution and the Lightning's founding, Johnson was named an owner of a Las Vegas franchise in the Global Flag Football League, a proposed professional flag football league. In February 2025, the GFFL promoted Johnson to league president. On December 31, 2025, Johnson was named as special consultant to American Indoor Football.
