= Washington Wolfpack =

American indoor football team

- Current season
Logo

General information
- Founded: 2023
- Headquartered: Angel of the Winds Arena in Everett, Washington
- Colors: Dark Blue, Teal, Mint Green, Purple, Gold
- Mascot: Apollo
- WashingtonWolfpack.com

Personnel
- Owners: Mike Thomas, Kelly Fahey, Miguel Morga
- General manager: Scott Brumfiel
- Head coach: J. R. Wells

Team history
- Washington Wolfpack (2024–present)

Home fields
- Angel of the Winds Arena (2024–present)

League / conference affiliations
- Arena Football League (2024); Arena Football One (2025–present); West Division (2025–present)

The Washington Wolfpack are a professional arena football team based in Everett, Washington, that competes in Arena Football One (AF1).

== History ==
The original Arena Football League (AFL) first started in 1987 and continued operating until 2009, when it went bankrupt. The league was brought back in 2010 and continued until folding a second time due to bankruptcy following the 2019 season. Everett, Washington, has had several professional indoor football teams in their history: the Everett Hawks played in the AFL's developmental league (AF2) for several years until folding in 2007, the Everett Destroyers were proposed as an inaugural member of the Indoor Football League (IFL) in 2009 but never played, and in 2012 the city had the Everett Raptors in the IFL.

Standings
Year	Record	Home	Away	Division	League
2024	2-7	1-4	1-3	N/A	AFL
2025	2-10	1-5	1-5	2-4	AF1
2026	5-7	1-5	4-2	N/A	AF1

Head to Head
Team	Total	Home	Away	PF	PA
Albany Firebirds	0-2	0-1	0-1	46	140
Beaumont Renegades	1-1	0-1	1-0	68	74
Billings Outlaws	0-4	0-2	0-2	63	237
Corpus Christi Tritons	0-1	0-1	N/A	21	61
Kentucky Barrels	1-0	1-0	N/A	47	42
Michigan Arsenal	0-1	0-1	N/A	36	64
Minnesota Monsters	0-1	N/A	0-1	42	56
Nashville Kats	0-3	0-2	0-1	53	181
Oceanside Bombers	1-0	N/A	1-0	43	30
Oregon Black Bears	0-2	0-1	0-1	65	74
Oregon Lightning	4-3	1-2	3-1	226	222
Rapid City Marshals	1-0	1-0	N/A	76	20
Salina Liberty	0-2	N/A	0-2	11	113
SW Kansas Storm	1-2	0-1	1-1	87	172
West Texas Desert Hawks	0-1	0-1	N/A	21	34
Wichita Regulators	0-1	0-1	N/A	21	48
Total	9-24	3-14	6-10	926	1568

Playoff Head to Head
Team	Total	Home	Away	PF	PA
Minnesota Monsters	0-1	N/A	0-1	32	48
Total	0-1	N/A	0-1	32	48

=== Arena Football League (2024) ===
Four years after the original AFL folded for the second time, it was announced on February 1, 2023, that the league intended on relaunching in 2024. On July 18, the 16 intended market cities were announced, including Everett. Officials in several of the cities stated they were surprised at the announcement and were unaware of an AFL team coming. The manager of Angel of the Winds Arena, Everett's only major arena, said that he was only informed about it after the announcement was made, and after contacting Lee Hutton, AFL commissioner, received notice that the league would only reveal information "on our time".

Details about the Everett team were scant in the weeks following the announcement. Eventually, an agreement with Angel of the Winds Arena was secured in late September. Everett Arena Football Club LLC was announced as the ownership group, led by Mike Thomas, the owner of the semi-pro Everett Royals. Thomas noted that he had acquired the franchise after contacting the league in hopes of getting Royals players onto the squad, only to find that the league had not yet lined up an owner for the city's team at the time.

J. R. Wells, a former player for the Everett Hawks and offensive coordinator for the Royals, was announced as the team's first head coach. Several sponsorship deals were also announced, including with Major League Pizza, Tony V's Garage and Buzz Inn Steakhouse. A poll to select the team's name was held in mid-October with four options: Night Howlers, Wolfpack, Cascades and Werewolves. On October 26, the team name was officially announced as the Washington Wolfpack. The 2024 AFL season is scheduled to begin in April 2024. Their main geographic rivals in the new AFL were the Billings Outlaws and the Oregon Blackbears.

On April 27, 2024, the Wolfpack lost their debut game on the road 40–47 to the Blackbears.

On May 12, 2024, kicker Melissa Strother made an extra point while playing for the Wolfpack, making her the first female player to score a point in the Arena Football League. Strother has since been named special teams coordinator for the team.

=== Arena Football One (2025–present) ===
On September 4, 2024, the Wolfpack joined the remaining members of the collapsed AFL in forming the new Arena Football One. They will play in the West Division along with the Billings Outlaws and Oregon Lightning (Potential opponents the Arizona Bandits went dormant for the season).

The Wolfpack's uniforms failed to arrive in time for the team's first game, forcing the Wolfpack to reuse the Everett Royals' uniforms for the first two games. Though the Wolfpack remained among the AF1's worst teams, the team upgraded its kicker position by replacing Strother with Nestor "Manny" Higuera, an alumnus of NAIA Arizona Christian University who converted from soccer and proved to be a skilled drop kicker, a valuable skill in AF1 since punting is forbidden but drop kicks score an additional point compared to place kicks and are treated as punts if they do not score. Higuera would score AF1's first drop kick field goal and would later gain viral attention (the second time in his life, following a game-winning placekick field goal at ACU in 2021) as much for his kicking skill as his unusually stout physique (the 5-foot, 5-inch kicker weighed 270 pounds).

On August 28, 2025, the Wolfpack announced the addition of longtime arena football veteran Delvin Myles, who spent the previous season with the rival Oregon Lightning, as their new defensive coordinator.

== Notable coaches ==
- Delvin Myles – defensive coordinator
