= Oregon State Fair =

Annual event in Oregon, United States

Coordinates: 44.95917°N 123.00806°W

- Genre: State fair
- Dates: August–September including Labor Day
- Locations: Salem, Oregon
- Years active: 1858–present (excluding 1905, 1942–1944, 2020)
- Website: www.oregonstatefair.org

The Oregon State Fair is the official state fair of the U.S. state of Oregon. It takes place every August–September at the 185-acre (0.75 km^{2}) Oregon State Fairgrounds located in north Salem, the state capital, as it has almost every year since 1862. In 2006, responsibility for running the fair was delegated to the Oregon State Parks and Recreation Department, and the division is now known as the Oregon State Fair & Exposition Center (OSFEC), which holds events on the fairgrounds year-round.

== History ==
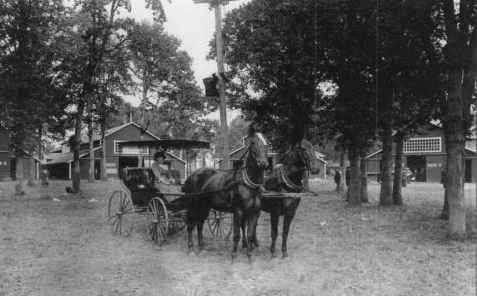
Horse and buggy Oregon State Fairgrounds 1867

As Oregon agriculture expanded in the early 19th century many communities formed agricultural associations for the purpose of sharing information on farming practices and resources. These groups began to organize county fairs such as the Yamhill County Fair (1850). Shortly thereafter the Oregon Farmer newspaper began calling for a statewide fair. A group of farmers known as the Oregon Fruitgrowers Association organized the first unofficial state fair in 1858. That year is recognized as the official anniversary year of the fair.

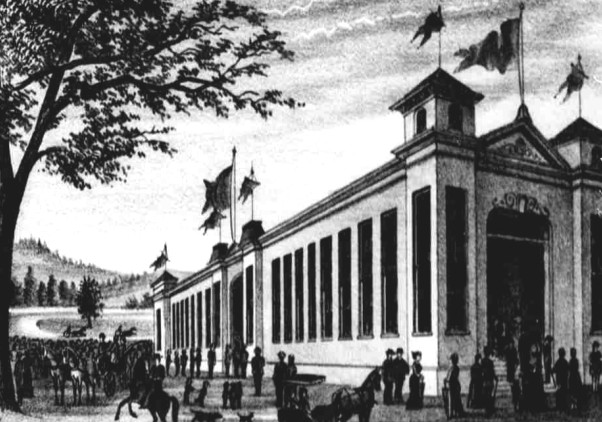
The fairgrounds circa 1881

In 1860, the association merged with other county groups and became the Oregon State Agricultural Society, who held the first official fair in 1861 in the Gladstone/Oregon City area. It was felt a larger area was needed and following a proposal by the Marion County Agriculture Society, the second official state fair was held in Salem in 1862 on the grounds of the Marion County Fair, where it has remained ever since. Homesteader John Savage donated 8 acres (32,000 m^{2}) of his land, which was three miles (5 km) outside of Salem at the time, while pioneer John Minto contributed $1,200 to build a wooden fence around the grounds. The fairgrounds were annexed into Salem in 1921.

Aerial view of the 1967 fire

The fair has been held every year on the same site, except in 1905, because the Lewis and Clark Centennial Exposition was taking place in Portland that year, and during the World War II years of 1943 and 1944; instead the fairgrounds were leased to military units as a place to bivouac. Also, although the 1942 fair was held, it was scaled back to only include 4-H displays, livestock exhibits, and displays from 27 Oregon counties, so it was not considered an official State Fair. The fair was also canceled in 2020 due to the COVID-19 pandemic.

=== 1967 Fire ===
In 1967, an arson occurred just before the opening of the fair, burning several large structures. Along with the fair commissioners, Governor Tom McCall felt the fair should go on, so many groups donated time and money for the cleanup and sent facilities like tents from as far away as the Portland Rose Festival so the fair could open.

=== National Register of Historic Places ===
- Oregon State Fair Stadium and Poultry Building Ensemble
- U.S. National Register of Historic Places
- Location: 2330 17th Ave NE; Salem, Oregon
- Built: 1919, 1921
- Architectural style: Mission/Spanish
- NRHP reference No.: 02000671
- Added to NRHP: June 20, 2002

The state fairground is the site of two historic buildings listed on the National Register of Historic Places: the Oregon State Fair Stadium and Poultry Building Ensemble. The 1919 horse stadium and the 1921 poultry building were added to the register in 2002. The poultry building is known for the "chicken head" relief sculptures that decorate the exterior. The horse stadium is the oldest state building in Oregon in continuous use.

=== Heritage oak grove ===
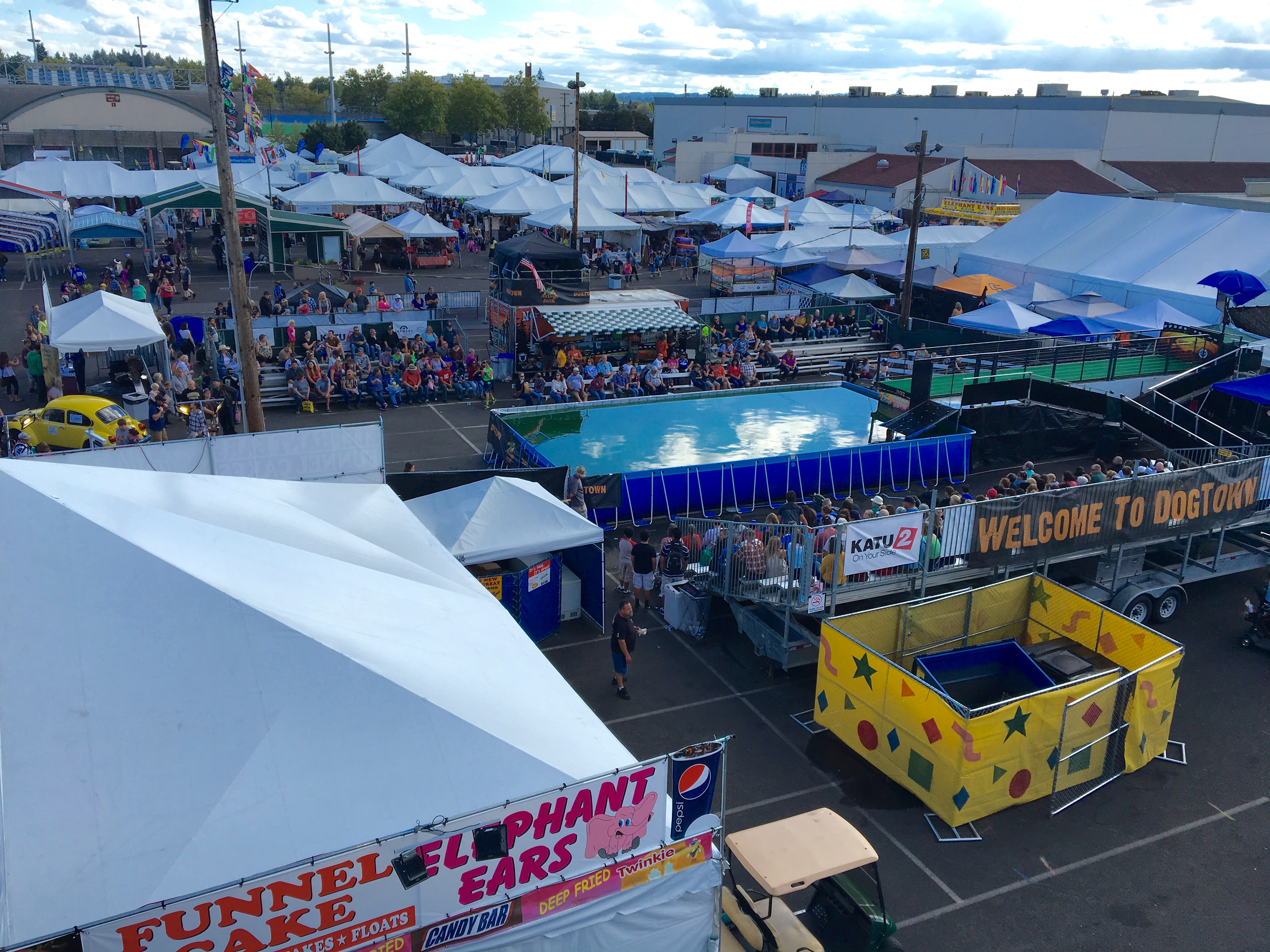
View of part of the 2016 state fair

In 2007, a 200-year-old grove of Oregon White Oaks across the street from the main fairgrounds was designated by the Oregon Heritage Tree Committee as an Oregon Heritage Tree site. The grove was used as a camping and gathering place by the area's original inhabitants, the Kalapuya, who collected acorns and camas there. The site later became a camping place for fairgoers who originally arrived in wagons and created a tent city during the fair; the practice of camping in the grove continued into modern times.

=== Reorganization ===
Following a period of financial trouble, the Oregon Legislative Assembly directed the Oregon Parks and Recreation Department to take over management of the fair in 2006. As of 2008, the fair's slogan was: "It's like a magical enchanted land. Except real."

== Events ==
Through the years the fair has showcased Oregon crops and livestock, arts, and culture, and has hosted many food booths and vendors as well as judging competitions, horse racing and popular entertainers. In 2007 the fair hosted its first Lucha Libre (Hispanic wrestling) event.

== Facilities ==
Outdoor concerts are held at the L. B. Day Amphitheatre, which was named in 1987 for L. B. Day, an Oregon State Senator and supporter of the fair.

The Oregon State Fairgrounds Pavilion, completed in 2004, is the newest building on the fairgrounds. The 5,000-seat indoor pavilion is used year-round for a variety of events. The pavilion and parking replaced a badly deteriorated grandstand that was built in 1929, and the horse racing track. Architectural ornaments from the grandstand's facade were to be salvaged and incorporated into the replacement building. In 2024, it was the home of the Arena Football League's Oregon Blackbears for only three games.

The Salem Armory Auditorium is located on a corner of the fairgrounds site, but is not affiliated with the State Fair. This concert venue is owned by the Oregon Military Department.

== Gallery ==
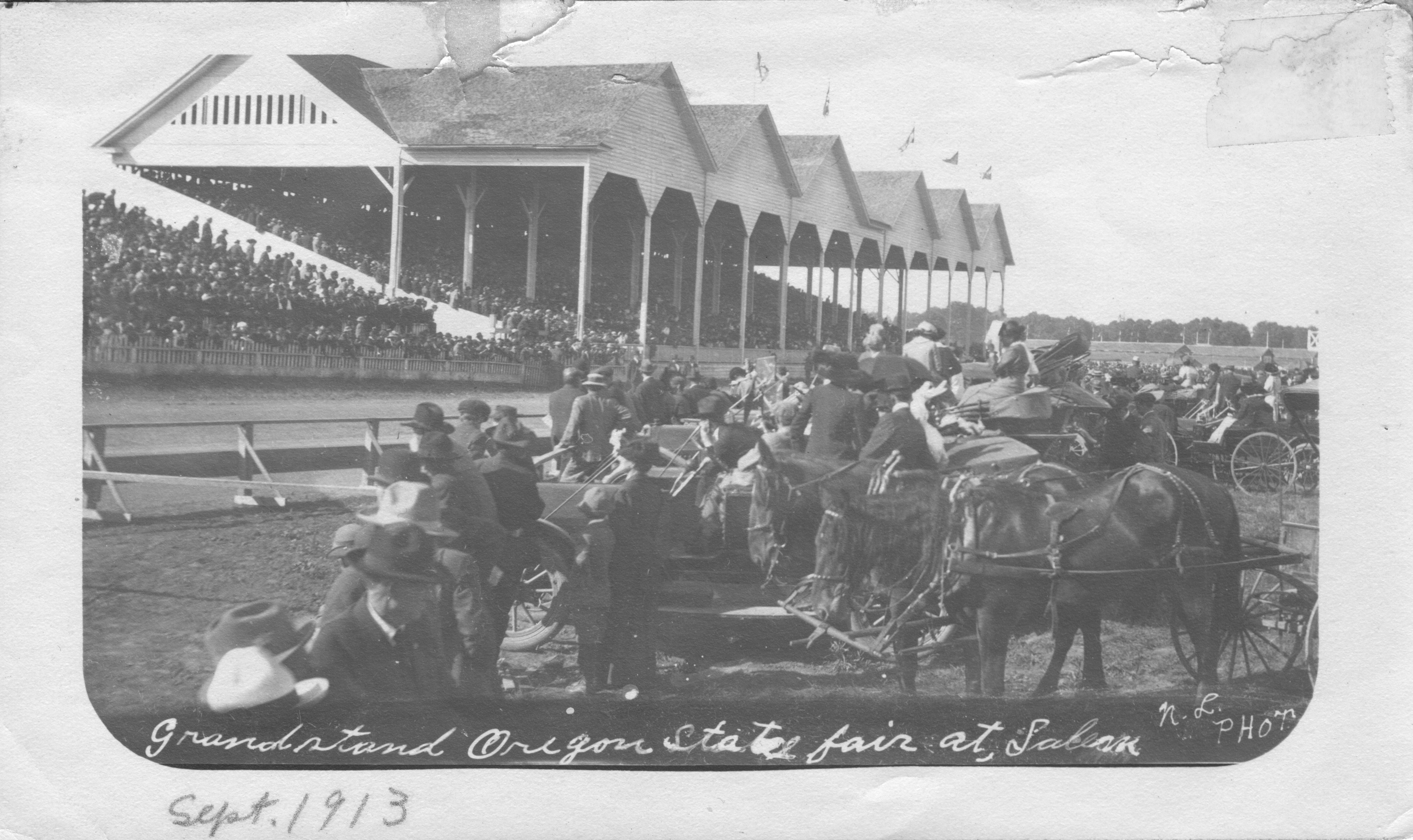
Grandstands at the fair in 1913

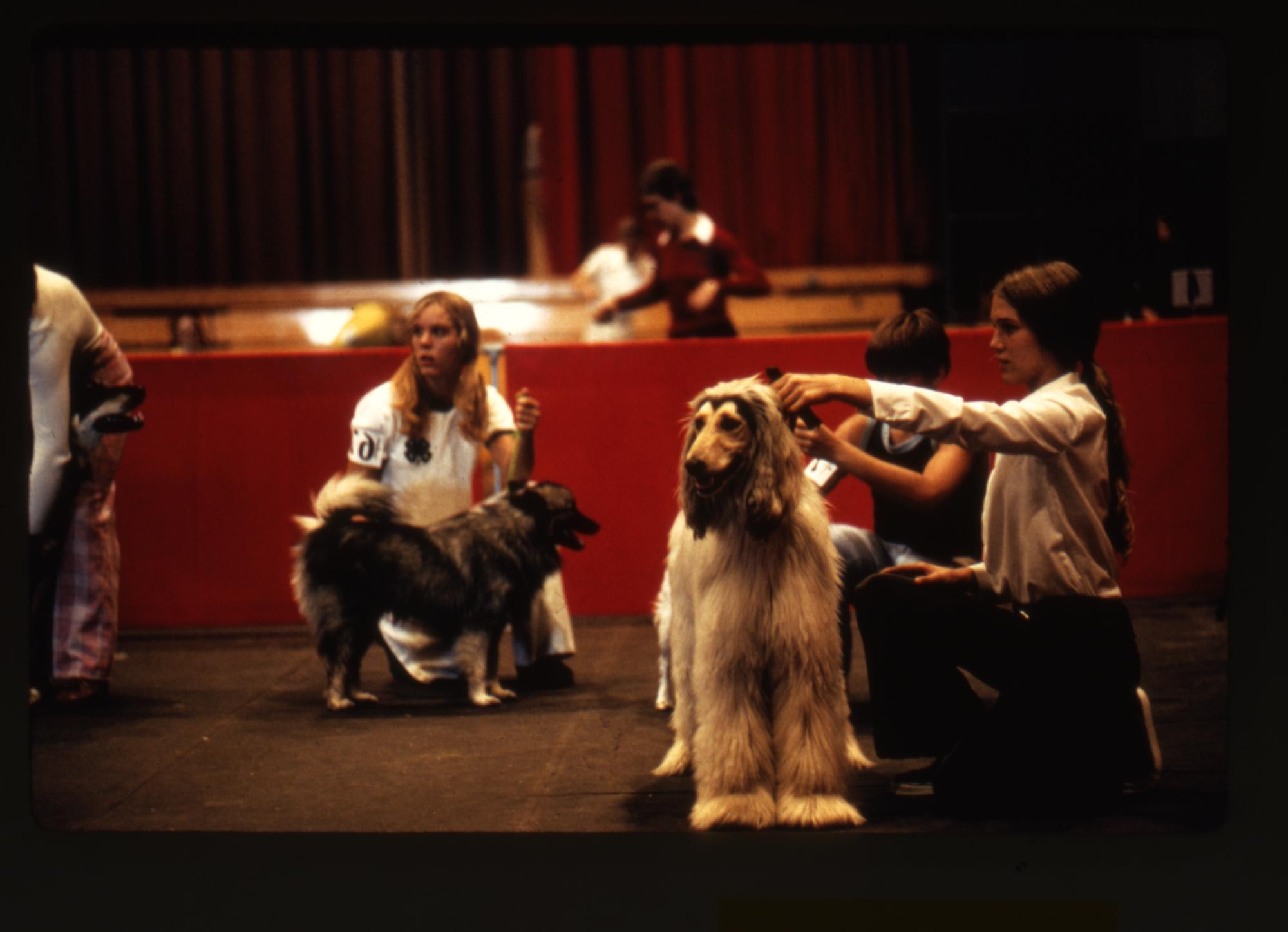
A dog show at the fair circa 1975

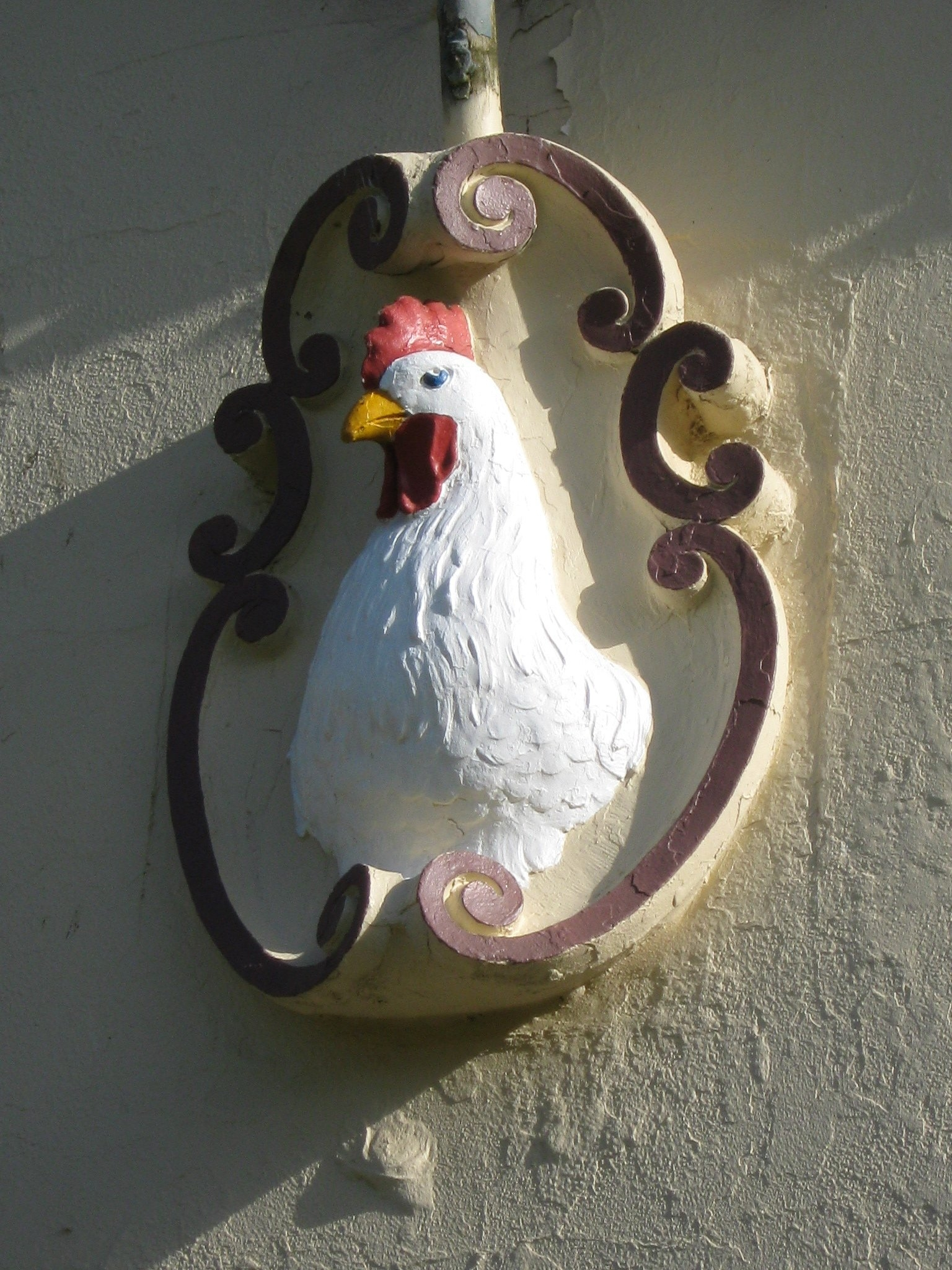
Detail of chicken head on poultry building

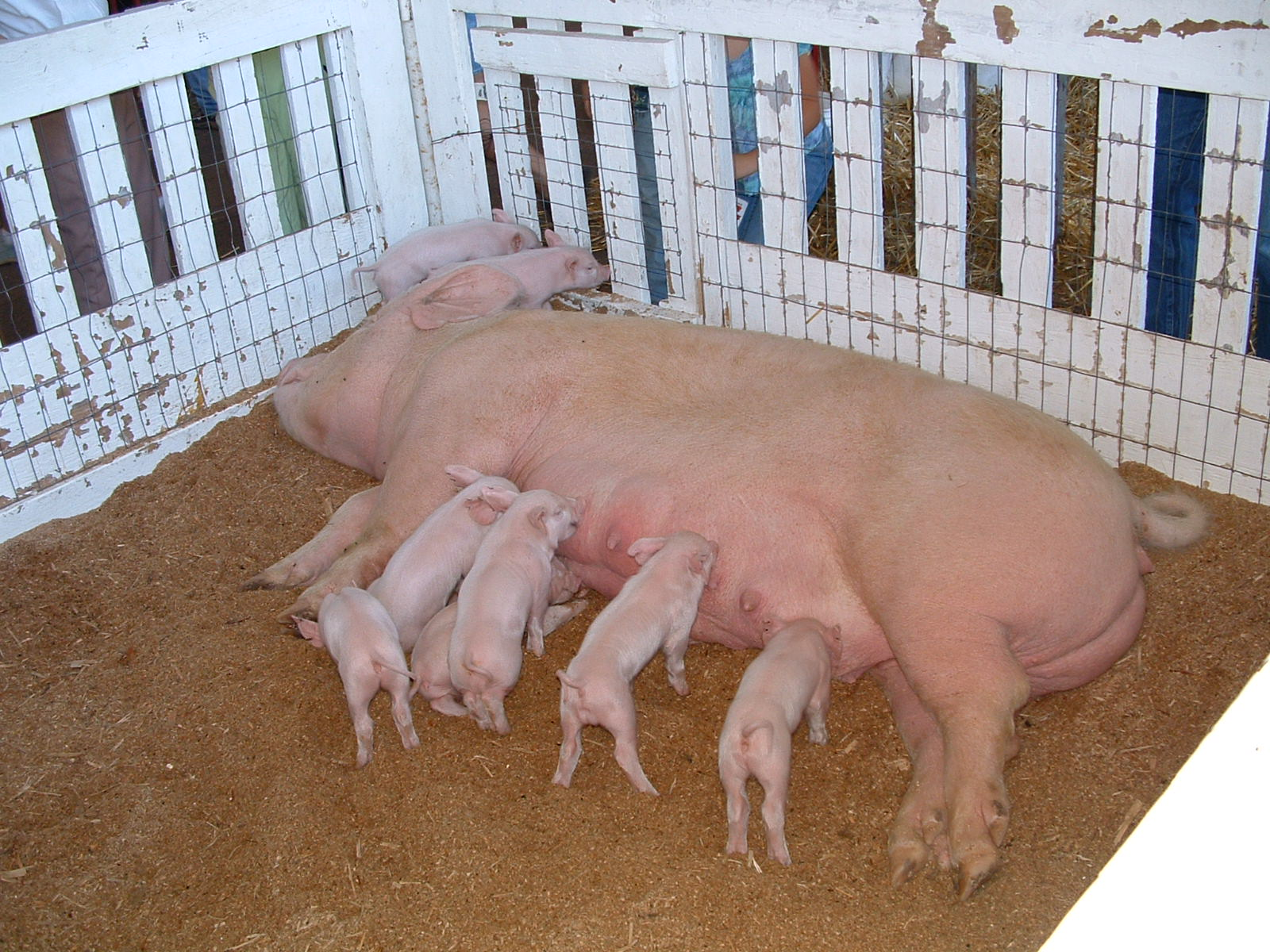
Pigs at the fair in 2005

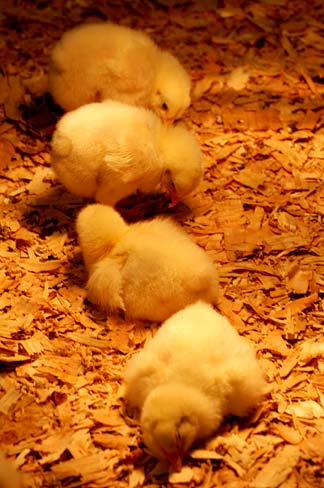
Chicks under a heat lamp at the fair in 2007

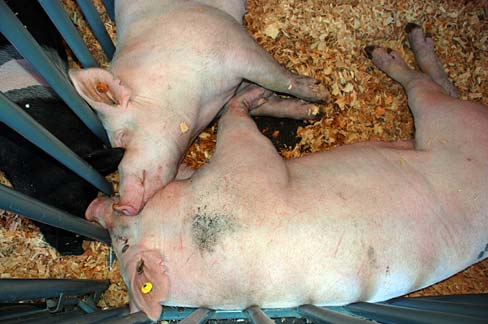
Pigs, 2007

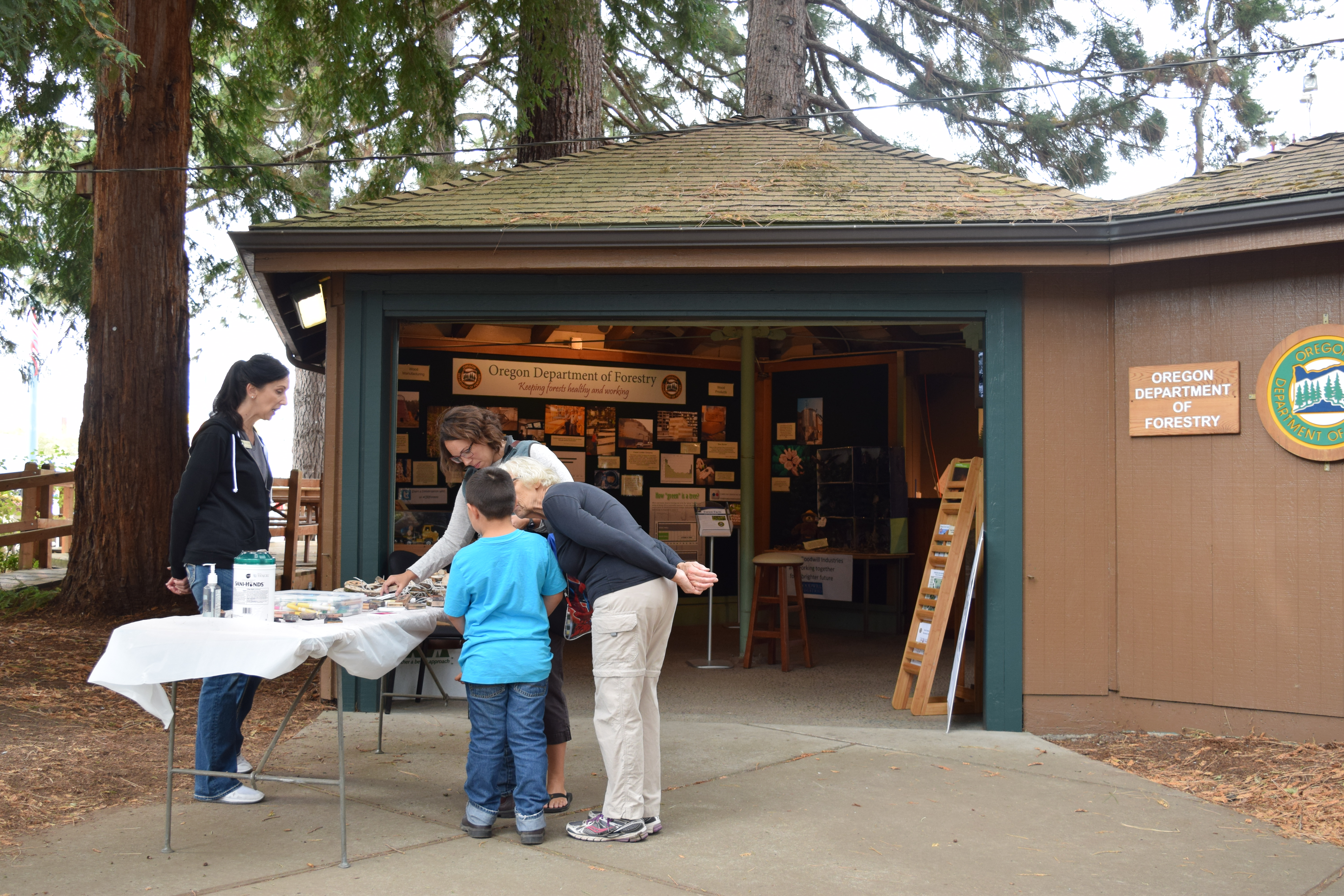
Department of Forestry building, 2015

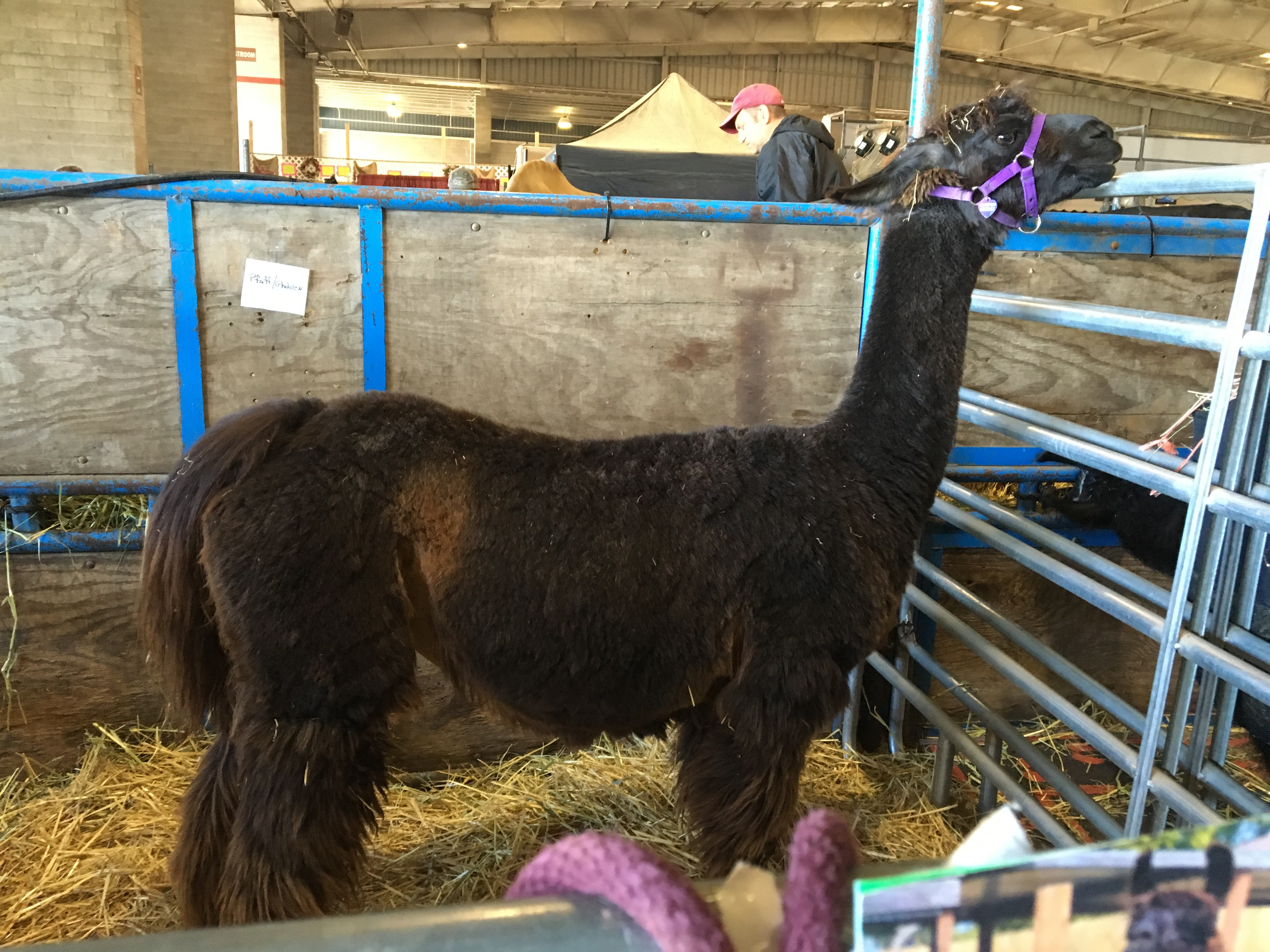
Llama at the fair, 2016

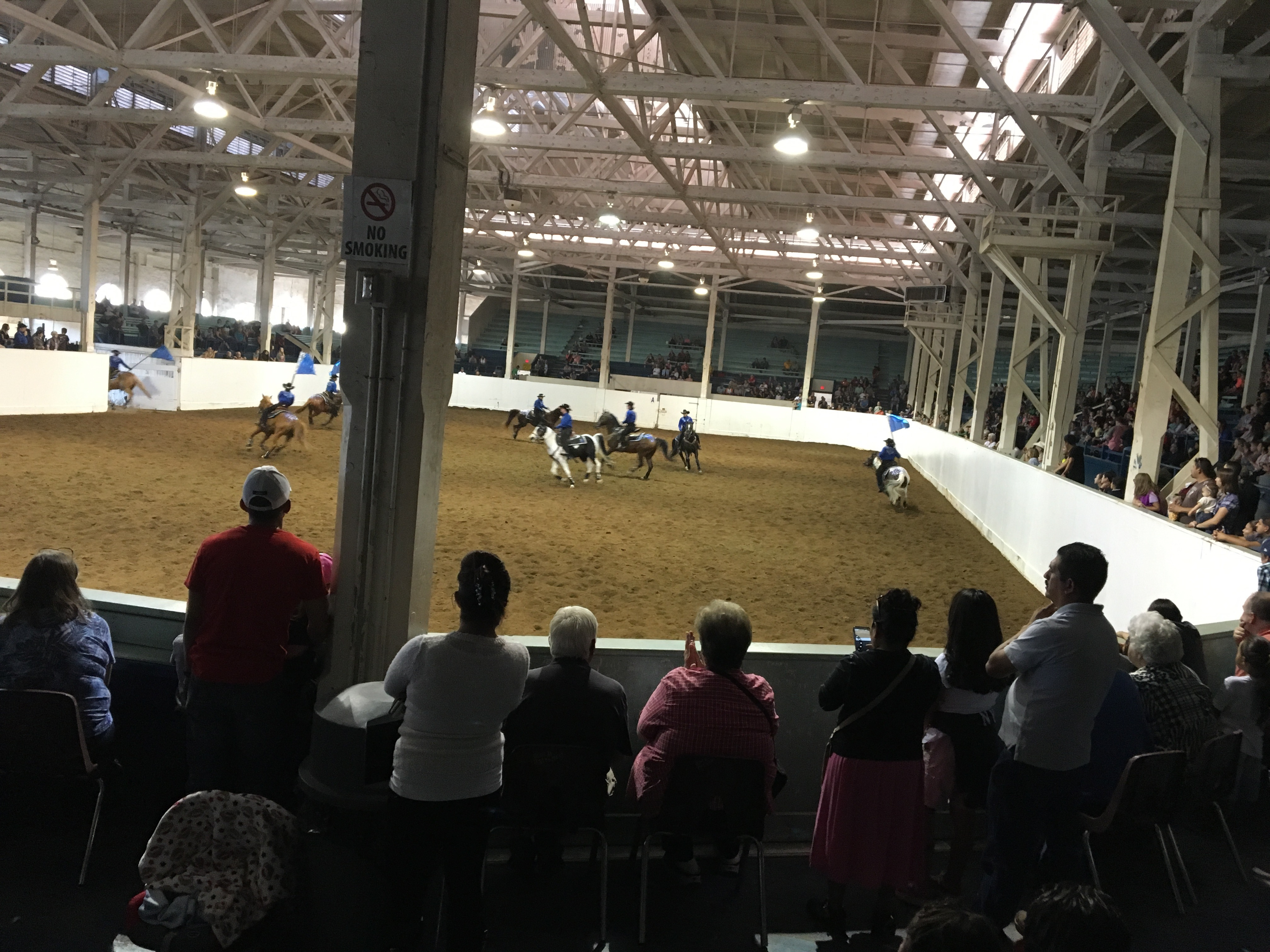
Horse show, 2016

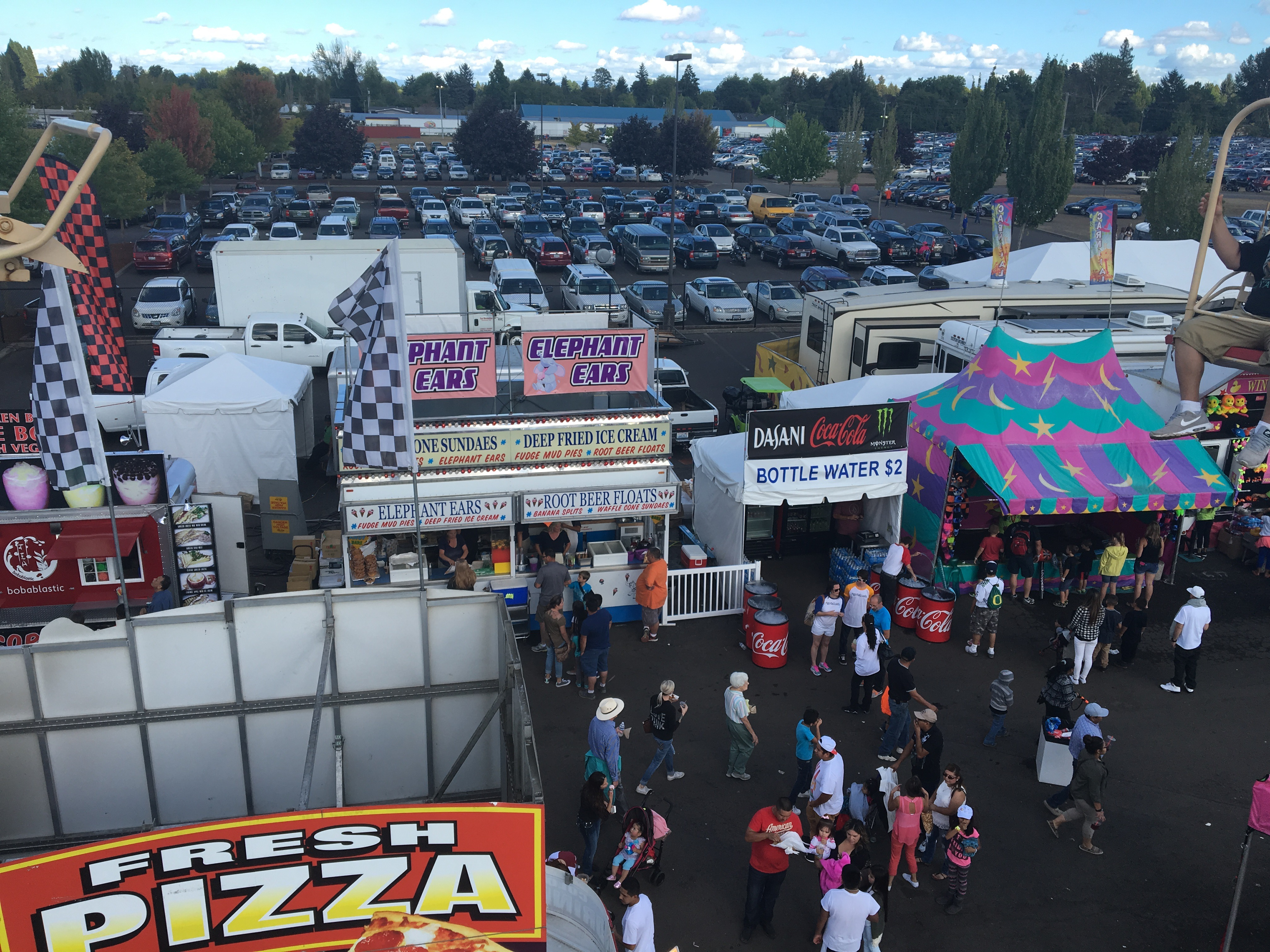
Another section of fair, 2016

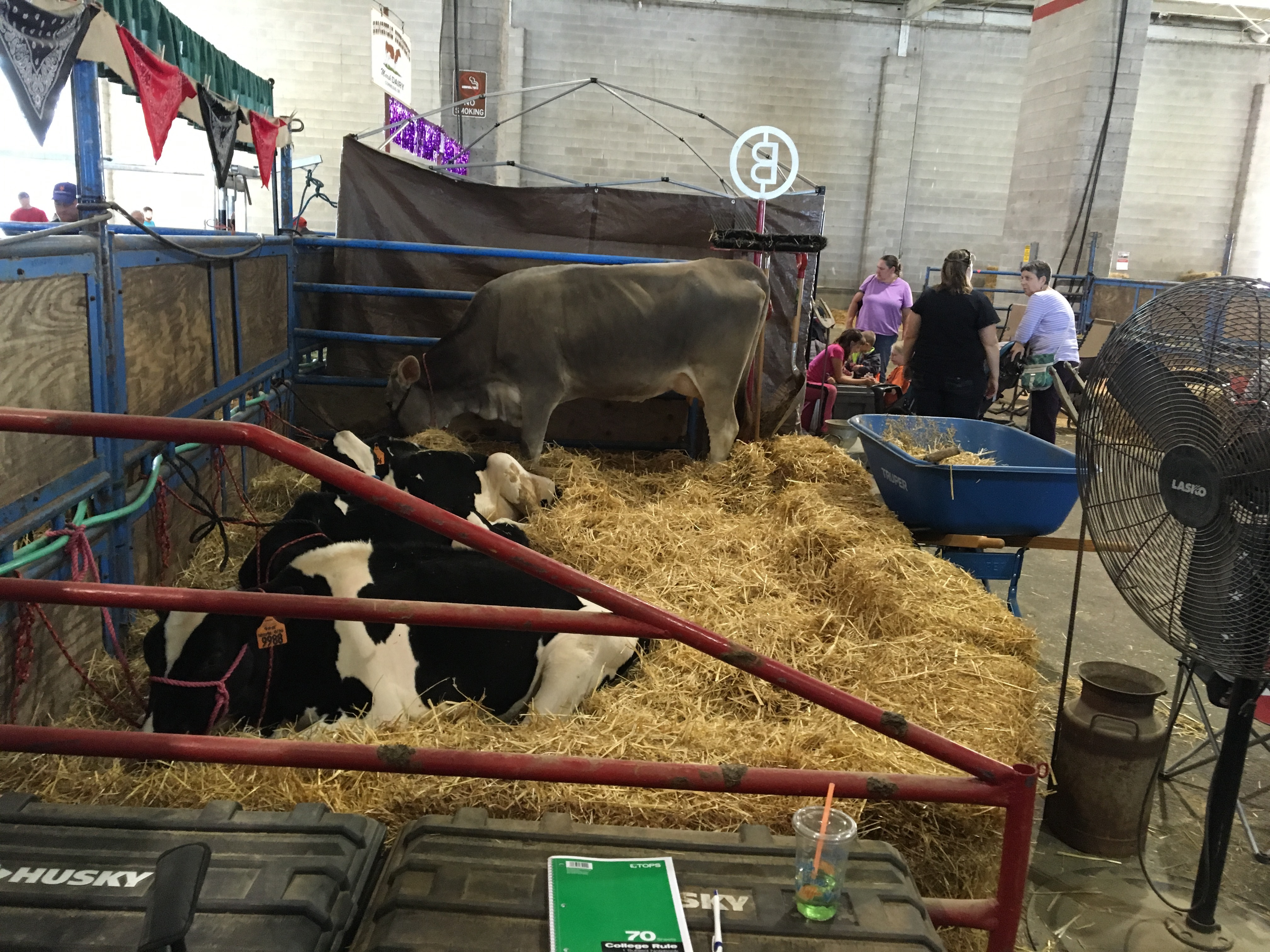
Cattle, 2016

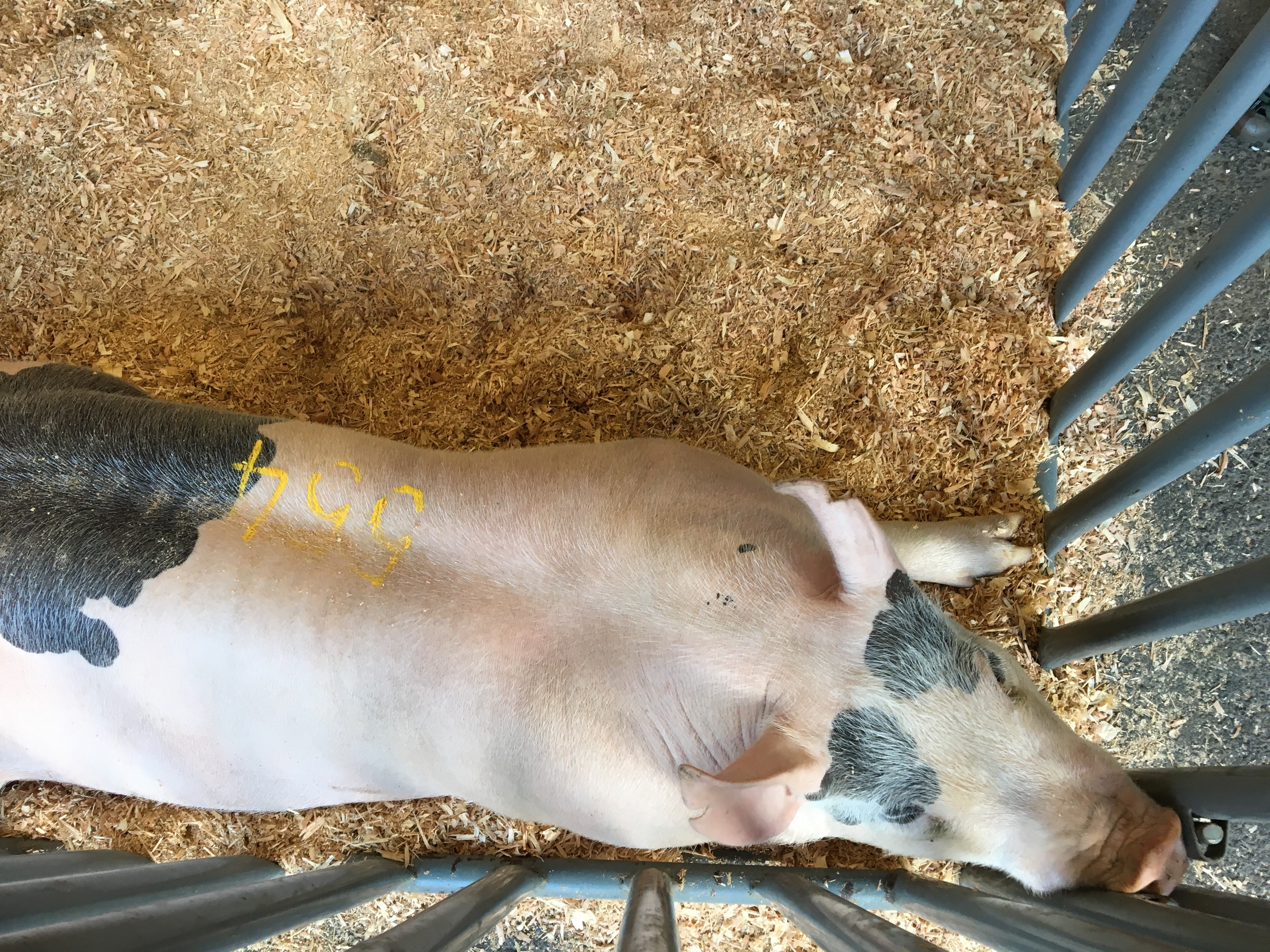
Pig, 2016

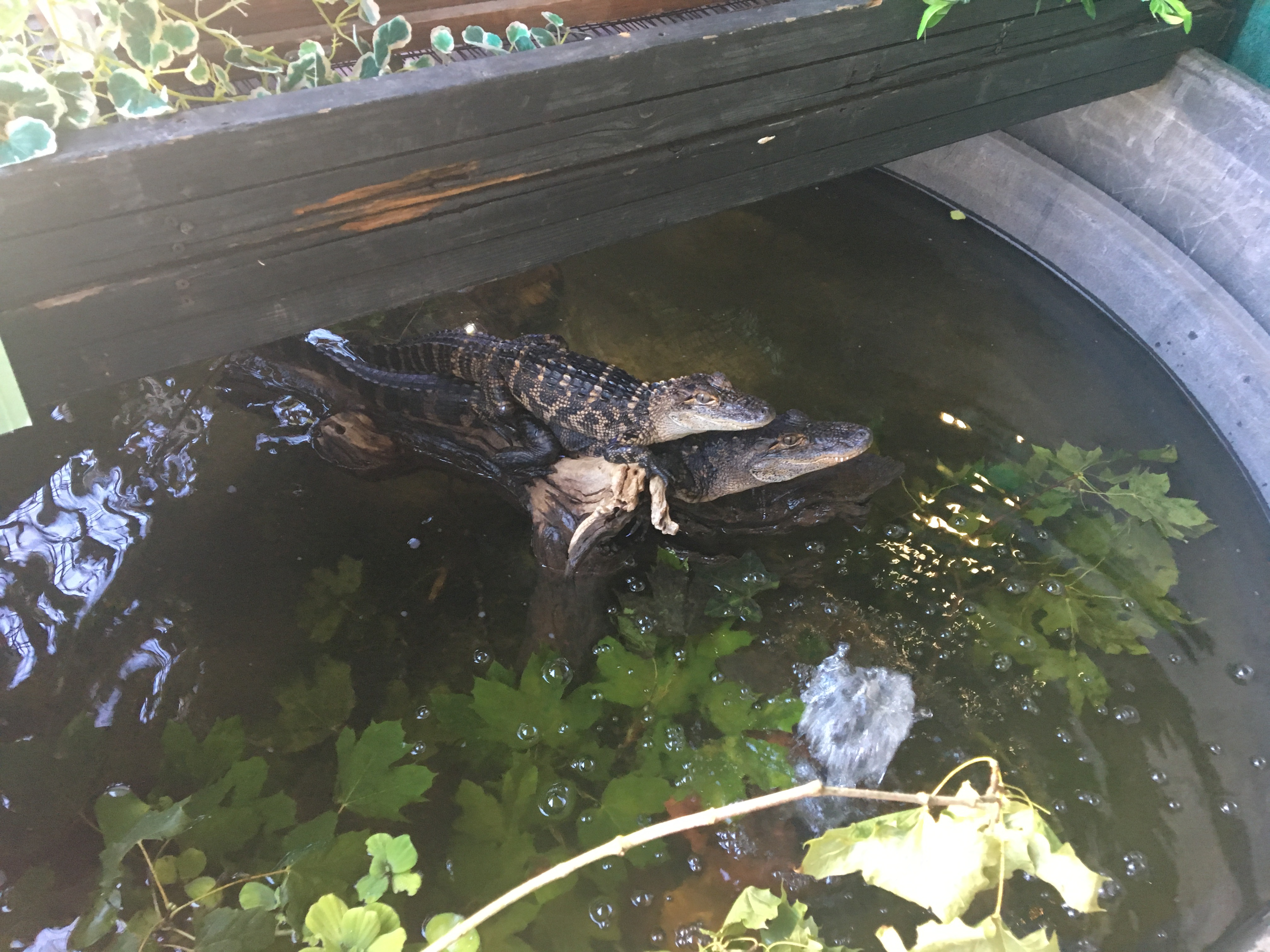
Alligators, 2017

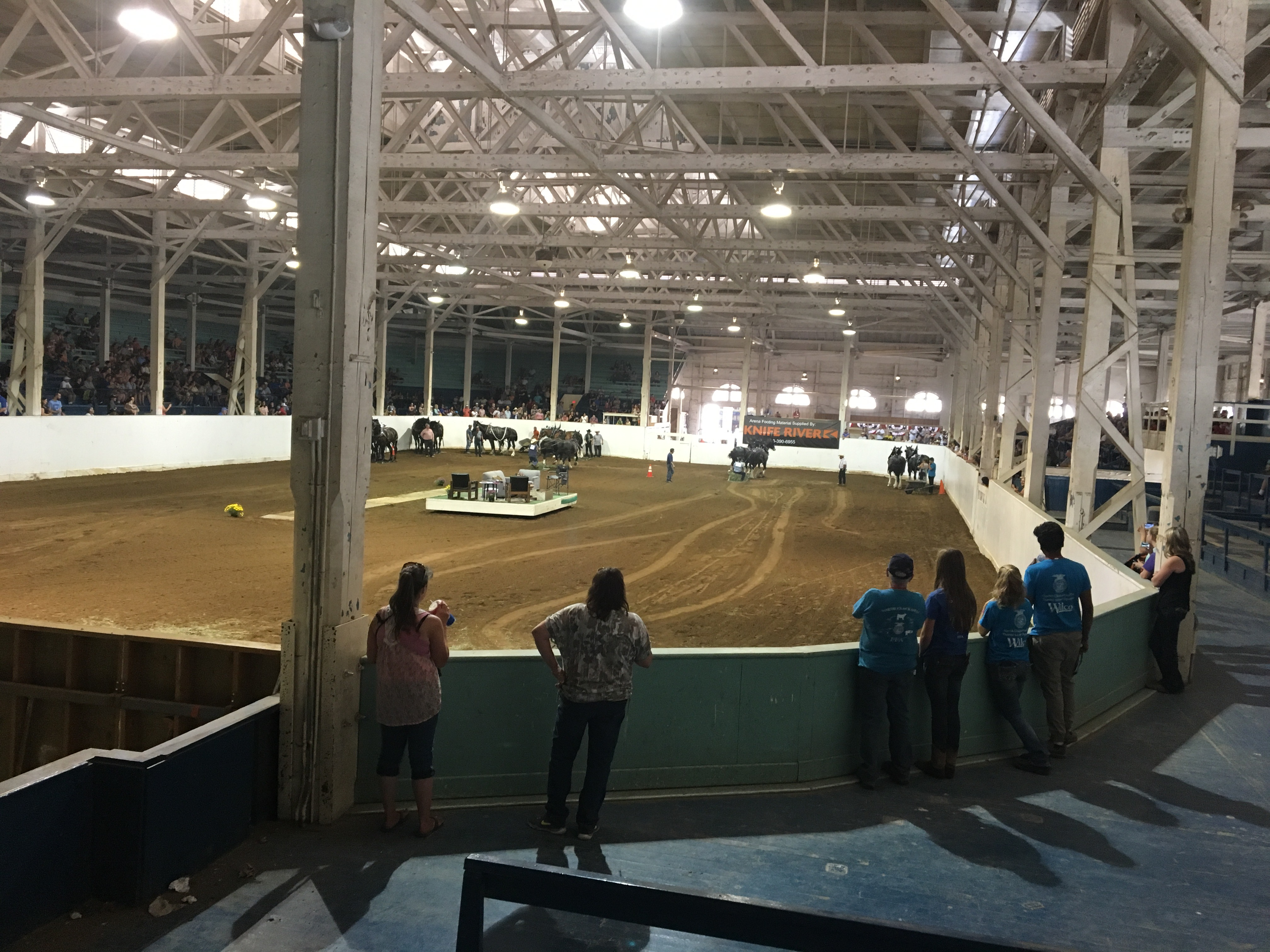
Horse event, 2017
