= Wenatchee Valley Skyhawks =

American indoor football team

Logo

General information
- Founded: 2018; 8 years ago
- Headquartered: Wenatchee, Washington at Town Toyota Center
- Colors: Black, green, silver, white, vegas gold
- Mascot: Hawkeye
- WVSkyhawks.com

Personnel
- Owners: Hook Sports Media, LLC (Theo R. Hall III, Craig Wright)
- General manager: Theo R. Hall III
- Head coach: Vacant

Nickname
- Skyhawks

Team history
- Wenatchee Valley Skyhawks (2019–present)

Home fields
- Town Toyota Center (2019–present)

League / conference affiliations
- American West Football Conference (2019–2023)

Playoff appearances (2)
- 2019, 2022

The Wenatchee Valley Skyhawks are a dormant professional indoor football team based in Wenatchee, Washington, that began playing football in 2019 with home games at the Town Toyota Center. It is the first team to play in the Wenatchee Valley since the Wenatchee Valley Venom of the Indoor Football League in 2011. They are owned by Hook Sports Media, LLC.

== History ==
On October 15, 2018, the American West Football Conference (AWFC) was founded by the Idaho Horsemen and added the Skyhawks, Reno Express, and Tri-Cities Fire to create the league.

Prior to the planned start of the 2020 AWFC season, the Tri-Cities Fire folded leading to the Skyhawks deciding to play an independent schedule. The league then tried to move forward with three teams — Idaho, Wenatchee, and the expansion Yakima Canines — following the withdrawal of the Reno Express from the league with non-league teams filling for the newly vacant dates. The AWFC then postponed the 2020 season due to the ongoing COVID-19 pandemic and then cancelled the season entirely due to the unavailability of arenas during the pandemic. The AWFC played the 2021 season, adding two teams in the Oregon High Desert Storm and Tri-City Rush, but the Skyhawks were unable to play any home games due to their home arena, the Town Toyota Center, being used for as a pandemic relief center and vaccination site.

In 2022, the Skyhawks were able to return to playing home games. They posted a 6-4 record and went to the American West Bowl III where they lost 32–57 to the Tri City Rush.

In 2023, the Skyhawks finished their season with a 69-57 loss to the Oregon High Desert Storm. After the season ended, the AWFC folded officially in 2024 following the departure of the Horsemen to the National Arena League and the Skyhawks were forced to go dormant in 2024 with hopes of playing again in the future.

== Season-by-season records ==
League champions	Playoff berth

Season	League	Regular season			Postseason results
Season	League	Finish	Wins	Losses	Postseason results
2019	AWFC	2nd	6	6	Lost semifinal (Reno) 27–28
2020	AWFC	Season canceled due to the COVID-19 pandemic			
2021	AWFC	5th	0	4	
2022	AWFC	3rd	5	4	Won semifinal (Idaho) 80–70; Lost American West Bowl III (Tri-City Rush) 32–57
2023	AWFC	3rd (Note: Only counting league games.)	1	3	
Total			12	17	All-time regular season record (2019–2023)
Total			1	2	All-time postseason record (2019–2023)
Total			13	19	All-time regular season and postseason record (2019–2023)

== Roster ==
Wenatchee Valley Skyhawks roster
Quarterbacks: Currently vacant; Running backs: Currently vacant; Wide receivers: Currently vacant	Offensive linemen: Currently vacant; Defensive linemen: Currently vacant	Linebackers: Currently vacant; Defensive backs: Currently vacant; Special teams: Currently vacant	Reserve lists: Currently vacant; Rookies in italics; Roster updated March 22, 2025; 0 Active, 0 Inactive

== Staff ==
Wenatchee Valley Skyhawks staff
Front office: Owner - Hook Sports Media, LLC.; General manager - Theo Hall; Head coaches: Head coach - Vacant; Offensive coaches: Offensive coordinator - Vacant; Offensive coach - Vacant	Defensive coaches: Defensive coordinator – Vacant
