= Tri-Cities Fire =

Logo

General information
- Founded: 2018
- Folded: 2020
- Headquartered: Kennewick, Washington at Toyota Center
- Colors: Black, red, gold, white
- Mascot: Sparky
- GoFireFootball.com

Personnel
- Owners: Rampage Sports Entertainment, LLC (Kinshasa Martin)
- General manager: Andy Allord
- Head coach: Kevin Heard

Team history
- Tri-Cities Fire (2019)

Home fields
- Toyota Center (2019)

League / conference affiliations
- American West Football Conference (2019)

The Tri-Cities Fire were a professional indoor football team based out of Kennewick, Washington, with home games at the Toyota Center during the 2019 season. They were owned by Kinshasa Martin of Rampage Sports Entertainment, LLC. They folded in February 2020 after playing one season, citing lack of support from sponsors and ticket sales. They were the second arena/indoor team to play in the Tri-City region preceded by the Tri-Cities Fever of the NIFL, af2 and the Indoor Football League and followed by the Tri-City Rush of the AWFC.

== History ==
On October 15, 2018, the American West Football Conference was founded by the Idaho Horsemen and added the Fire and two other teams to the league: the Reno Express, and Wenatchee Valley Skyhawks. The Fire were the first indoor football team in the Tri-Cities following the departure of the Tri-Cities Fever of the Indoor Football League in 2016. Despite being announced in October 2018, they were one of the last AWFC teams to sign a lease with the arena in January 2019.

Their season began on March 23, 2019, in a 42–24 loss at Reno. After a 0–5 start to their inaugural season, the Fire fired head coach Warren Reynolds and was replaced by defensive coordinator Kevin Heard. The Fire finished the season losing all twelve games. The team abruptly folded two weeks prior to the planned start of the 2020 season. They would be replaced a year later by the Tri-City Rush.

== 2019 standings ==
Final standings.

2019 American West Football Conference
Team	W	L	PCT	PF	PA	GB	STK
y — Idaho Horsemen	12	0	1.000	597	331	—	W12
x – Wenatchee Valley Skyhawks	6	6	.500	461	381	6	W2
x – Reno Express	6	6	.500	339	396	6	W1
Tri-Cities Fire	0	12	.000	303	592	12	L12

y – clinched regular season title

x – clinched playoff spot

==== Playoffs ====
Semifinal			Final
			3	Reno Express	20
3	Reno Express	28	1	Idaho Horsemen	40
2	Wenatchee Valley Skyhawks	27
