= Reno Express =

American indoor football team

Logo

General information
- Founded: 2019
- Folded: 2020
- Headquartered: Reno, Nevada at Reno Events Center
- Colors: Black, red, silver, white
- GoRenoExpress.com

Personnel
- Owners: Platinum Events & Security LLC
- Head coach: Troy Hansen
- President: Chris Reynolds

Team history
- Reno Express (2019)

Home fields
- Reno Events Center (2019)

League / conference affiliations
- American West Football Conference (2019)

Playoff appearances (1)
- 2019

The Reno Express were a professional indoor football team in Reno, Nevada. They play their home games at the Reno Events Center during the 2019 American West Football Conference (AFC) season. They were the first professional football team to play in Reno since the Reno Barons played part of a season in 2011. The team withdrew from the AWFC 2020 season about a month prior to the start of the season, but stated they had plans to return in 2021.

== History ==
On October 15, 2018, the American West Football Conference (AWFC) was founded by the Idaho Horsemen and announced the Express, Tri-Cities Fire, and Wenatchee Valley Skyhawks as the inaugural members. The Express are owned by Platinum Events & Security LLC, the organization that also own the Idaho Horsemen and operates the AWFC.

Anthony Bartley was the team's first head coach, but left the team after five games and a 2–3 record. He was replaced by assistant Troy Hansen to finish the season with a 6–6 record and the third seed in the playoffs. The Express traveled to Wenatchee, Washington and defeated the Skyhawks 28–27 to advance to the first championship game against the undefeated Idaho Horsemen. Prior the championship game, the team started a GoFundMe fundraiser in order to pay for their trip to Idaho claiming a former associate had been stealing money from the organization. They made it to Boise, and lost 40–20. The Express folded months later and the league would fold in 2024 following the departure of their founding franchise, the Horsemen, to the National Arena League.

== Logo change and controversy ==
The team's original announced logo bore a resemblance to the logo of the Round Rock Express, a Minor League Baseball team. Because the Round Rock team owned the trademarks to the logo, the Reno team was forced to change their primary logo. The team's Facebook page was updated with a temporary logo on October 15, 2018, which was ultimately scrapped in favor of their another logo in late October 2018.

== 2019 standings ==
Final standings.

2019 American West Football Conference
Team	W	L	PCT	PF	PA	GB	STK
y — Idaho Horsemen	12	0	1.000	597	331	—	W12
x – Wenatchee Valley Skyhawks	6	6	.500	461	381	6	W2
x – Reno Express	6	6	.500	339	396	6	W1
Tri-Cities Fire	0	12	.000	303	592	12	L12

y – clinched regular season title

x – clinched playoff spot

==== Playoffs ====
Semifinal			Final
			3	Reno Express	20
3	Reno Express	28	1	Idaho Horsemen	40
2	Wenatchee Valley Skyhawks	27
