= American West Football Conference =

American football minor league

- Sport: Indoor football
- Founded: 2018
- Founder: Platinum Events & Security LLC
- First season: 2019
- Folded: 2024
- President: Chris Reynolds
- Commissioner: Brandon Berner
- No. of teams: 2 (as of October 2nd 2023)
- Country: United States
- Last champion: Idaho Horsemen
- Most titles: Idaho Horsemen and Tri-City Rush (2 each)
- Website: AmericanWestFootballConference.com

The American West Football Conference (AWFC) was a professional indoor American football minor league created in 2018 by Platinum Events & Security, LLC, the owners of the Idaho Horsemen. The league's inaugural season was in 2019.

Players were paid $150 per game before taxes with no other benefits, although the teams attempted to help players find host families during the season. Teams' operating budgets were $200,000 per season.

The league had an inter-league scheduling agreement with the American Indoor Football Alliance.

== History ==
After being unable to join the Indoor Football League or Champions Indoor Football citing league instability, as well as financial and travel issues due to the distance from the rest of the leagues' teams, Chris Reynolds, owner of the Idaho Horsemen announced that his ownership group Platinum Events & Security, LLC, created a new indoor league, the American West Football Conference (AWFC). The league was created to fill the void of a lack of west coast teams and leagues and to decrease travel costs of operating the regional teams. The league was announced with four teams: the Horsemen, Reno Express, Tri-Cities Fire, and the Wenatchee Valley Skyhawks. The AWFC later added the Sacramento Spartans, but the team's facilities did not meet league standards and was removed a month before the start of the season.

The first game in league history was the Wenatchee Valley Skyhawks at the Idaho Horsemen on March 23, where the Horsemen won 33–22. The season's first forfeit came on May 4 when the Skyhawks did not travel to play the Reno Express, who instead played a local semiprofessional team in order to fulfill its lease agreement. The following week, the only scheduled game was also postponed citing travel issues with the Tri-Cities Fire visiting Idaho, but was made-up on June 19. Idaho went undefeated and won the championship game 40–20 over Reno.

For the 2020 season, the league announced expansion teams in Yakima, Washington, and the San Francisco Bay Area, although the Bay Area team never launched. In February 2020, the Reno Express was removed from the schedule and the Tri-Cities Fire folded, which led to the Idaho Horsemen and Wenatchee Valley Skyhawks both announce they would play independent schedules. The league then announced it would be playing the 2020 season with three teams — Idaho, Wenatchee, and Yakima — while looking for non-league teams to fill in the lost games including the minor outdoor team, Tri-City Rage, filling in for the Fire's six scheduled away games.

On March 13, 2020, the AWFC announced on its website that the 2020 season would be postponed due to the ongoing COVID-19 pandemic, citing the high number of cases reported from Washington, one of two states that had a team in the league. On July 31, 2020, the AWFC announced the cancellation of the 2020 season due to the unavailability of arenas during the pandemic. On September 28, 2020, the league announced a new expansion team in the state of Oregon for the 2021 season called the Oregon High Desert Storm. On November 13, 2020, the Tri-Cities were announced as the league's new franchise named the Tri-City Rush.

On November 22, 2022, league champions Tri-City Rush announced they were folding after their home arena in Pasco shut down for the 2023 season and not meeting their financial goals. With only three teams for the 2023 season, the AWFC announced they would play non-league games with four teams from the American Indoor Football Alliance, and the Cali Gold (San Francisco Bay area) from the American Arena League 2. The Idaho Horsemen defeated the Oregon High Desert Storm 42–20 on July 2, 2023, to win the league championship.

On September 21, 2023, the Horsemen were announced as joining the National Arena League for the 2024 season. As the league's flagship franchise, this effectively forced the two remaining teams to suspend or fold. Oregon High Desert eventually found buyers who plan on returning the team to play as the Oregon Lightning in Arena Football One for 2025.

== Final teams ==
=== League teams ===
- Idaho Horsemen (Nampa, Idaho) – left for the National Arena League in the 2024 season.
- Oregon High Desert Storm (Redmond, Oregon) - played from 2021 to 2023, rebranded as the Oregon Lightning for 2025 in Arena Football One.
- Reno Express (Reno, Nevada) – played the 2019 season but withdrew from the 2020 season.
- Tri-Cities Fire (Kennewick, Washington) – played the 2019 season and folded before the 2020 season.
- Tri-City Rush (Pasco, Washington) – played the 2021 and 2022 seasons. Folded in November 2022.
- Wenatchee Valley Skyhawks (Wenatchee, Washington) - played from 2021 to 2023.
- Yakima Canines (Yakima, Washington) – joined for the 2020 season before it was cancelled due to the pandemic, played the 2021 season, and the franchise was revoked prior to the 2022 season due to not meeting league minimum operating requirements. The Canines were replaced by the Washington Elite travel team to fill the rest of the league's home schedule.

=== Filler teams/Never played ===
- Cali Gold - Independent outdoor team in 2023.
- SoCal Redtails (City of Industry, California) – originally the San Diego Red Tails; joined for the 2022 season but never played. The independent Cali Gold was scheduled to fill in for one home game against the Oregon High Desert Storm.
- Washington Elite/Northwest Elite (N/A) – Travel team in 2022.

== Seasons ==
=== 2019 season ===
==== Standings ====
Final standings.

2019 American West Football Conference
Team	W	L	PCT	PF	PA	GB	STK
y — Idaho Horsemen	12	0	1.000	597	331	—	W12
x – Wenatchee Valley Skyhawks	6	6	.500	461	381	6	W2
x – Reno Express	6	6	.500	339	396	6	W1
Tri-Cities Fire	0	12	.000	303	592	12	L12

y – clinched regular season title

x – clinched playoff spot

==== Playoffs ====
Semifinal			Final
			3	Reno Express	20
3	Reno Express	28	1	Idaho Horsemen	40
2	Wenatchee Valley Skyhawks	27

=== 2021 season ===
==== Standings ====
Final standings.

2021 American West Football Conference
Team	W	L	PCT	PF	PA
x – Tri-City Rush	8	2	.800	621	329
x – Oregon High Desert Storm	7	3	.700	456	349
x – Idaho Horsemen	6	4	.600	517	346
Yakima Canines	1	9	.100	198	565
Wenatchee Valley Skyhawks	0	4	.000	69	272

y – clinched regular season title

x – clinched playoff spot

==== Playoffs ====
Semifinals (August 30)			American West Bowl II (September 4)
			3	Idaho Horsemen	27
3	Idaho Horsemen	55	1	Tri-City Rush	36
2	Oregon High Desert Storm	37

=== 2022 season ===
==== Standings ====
Final standings.

2022 American West Football Conference
Team	W	L	PCT	PF	PA
x – Tri-City Rush	9	0	1.000	392	114
x – Idaho Horsemen	6	3	.667	356	279
x – Wenatchee Valley Skyhawks	5	4	.556	239	233
Oregon High Desert Storm	4	5	.444	231	353
SoCal Red Tails	0	8	.000	—	—
Northwest Elite	0	4	.000	40	279

y – clinched regular season title

x – clinched playoff spot

==== Playoffs ====
Semifinals (June 26)			American West Bowl III (July 10)
			3	Wenatchee Valley Skyhawks	32
3	Wenatchee Valley Skyhawks	80	1	Tri-City Rush	57
2	Idaho Horsemen	70
