= Antwane Grant =

American football player (born 1992)

No. 1 – Nashville Kats
- Position: Wide receiver
- Roster status: Active

Personal information
- Born: August 14, 1992 (age 34)
- Listed height: 6 ft 1 in (1.85 m)
- Listed weight: 210 lb (95 kg)

Career information
- High school: John Dickinson (Pike Creek, Delaware)
- College: Western Kentucky
- NFL draft: 2016: undrafted

Career history
- Cincinnati Bengals (2016)*; Saskatchewan Roughriders (2017); Atlantic City Blackjacks (2019); Massachusetts Pirates (2020)*; Columbus Lions (2021); Albany Empire (2022); Philadelphia Soul (2024); Nashville Kats (2025–present)
- * Offseason or practice squad member only

Awards and highlights
- AFL Rookie of the Year (2019)
- Stats at CFL.ca
- Stats at ArenaFan.com

Antwane Grant (born August 14, 1992) is an American professional football wide receiver for the Nashville Kats of Arena Football One (AF1). He played college football at Western Kentucky University.

== Early life and college ==
Antwane Grant was born on August 14, 1992. He attended John Dickinson High School in Pike Creek, Delaware.

Grant first played college football at Nassau Community College from 2012 to 2013. He caught 27 passes for 395 yards and five touchdowns as a freshman in 2012. As a sophomore in 2013, he totaled 46 catches for 913 yards and 12 touchdowns, earning first-team all-conference and honorable mention All-American honors. Grant then transferred to Western Kentucky University, where he was a two-year letterman for the Hilltoppers from 2014 to 2015. He caught 41 passes for 509 yards and six touchdowns his junior year in 2014. As a senior in 2015, Grant recorded 55 receptions for 701 yards and seven touchdowns while also rushing three times for 65 yards and one touchdown.

== Professional career ==
After going undrafted in the 2016 NFL draft, Grant signed with the Cincinnati Bengals on May 6, 2016. He was later released on August 29, 2016.

In April 2017, Grant signed with the Saskatchewan Roughriders of the Canadian Football League after a workout at the team's Florida minicamp. He dressed in five games, starting three, for the Roughriders during the 2017 season, catching seven passes for 107 yards on 13 targets. He also spent part of the season on the practice roster. Grant was released on June 4, 2018.

Grant was assigned to the Atlantic City Blackjacks of the Arena Football League (AFL) on March 13, 2019. He caught 72 passes for 959 yards and 15 touchdowns for Atlantic City during the 2019 season while also rushing eight times for 24 yards and two touchdowns. He was named the AFL Co-Rookie of the Year, sharing the award with Fabian Guerra. The AFL folded after the 2019 season.

Grant signed with the Massachusetts Pirates of the National Arena League (NAL) for the 2020 NAL season. However, the 2020 season was cancelled due to the COVID-19 pandemic.

Grant was signed by the NAL's Columbus Lions in April 2021. He was named the NAL Offensive Player of the Week after totaling 13 receptions for 137 yards and five touchdowns in a game against the Albany Empire on July 24, 2021.

In February 2022, Grant signed with the Albany Empire of the NAL.

Grant signed with the Philadelphia Soul of the new Arena Football League for the 2024 season.

Grant joined the Nashville Kats of Arena Football One for the 2025 season. He played in six games for the Kats in 2025, catching 30 passes for 298 yards and seven touchdowns while also scoring one rushing touchdown. He appeared in two playoff games as well, recording 12 receptions for 104 yards and two touchdowns.

== Personal life ==
Grant has also spent time as an assistant high school football coach.
