= DeGrenier =

DeGrenier is a surname. Notable people with the surname include:

- Chad DeGrenier (born 1973), American football player
- Jack DeGrenier (born 1951), American football player
