= Stockton Crusaders =

American indoor football team

Logo

General information
- Founded: 2024
- Headquartered: Adventist Health Arena in Stockton, California
- StocktonCrusaders.com

Personnel
- General manager: Greg Pearce
- Head coach: Kurt Bryan
- President: Scott McKibben

Team history
- Stockton Crusaders

Home fields
- Adventist Health Arena

League / conference affiliations
- Arena Football One (2027-Future)

The Stockton Crusaders are a professional arena football team based in Stockton, California, that will compete in Arena Football One (AF1) beginning in 2027.

== History ==
The Crusaders are the second official Stockton-based team to play in the AFL system and the first since the Stockton Lightning who played in af2 from 2006 to 2009. The team was planned to begin play in 2025 alongside the rest of the AF1, but the Crusaders, along with Monterrey, announced that they would be pushing their seasons back to 2026. The logo was made using Artificial intelligence.

Arena Football One's predecessor, the 2024 revival of the Arena Football League, had initially announced a team in California's Central Valley. With a leaked social media page indicating this team would be named the California Grizzlies, this team was originally to play 233 miles (375 km) southeast of Stockton, in Bakersfield; its owner, Tim Carbajal, owned a semi-pro outdoor team in that city. Ultimately, Carbajal was unable to secure a lease agreement with Mechanics Bank Arena, and the Grizzlies never made it to play. The team logo eventually went with the Oregon Blackbears. Carbajal is now part-owner of the Arizona Bandits of AF1.

=== Birth of the Crusaders ===
The Stockton Crusaders were founded in June of 2024. On September 9, 2024, the Crusaders announced their intentions to join the newly-formed Arena Football One. Its head coach Kurt Bryan was a co-creator of the A-11 offense briefly used in outdoor football. Team president Scott McKibben had previously been chairman of the Oakland Coliseum authority.

On November 18, 2024, Arena Football One announced that the Crusaders and Monterrey Kings will sit out the 2025 season and debut in 2026. The Crusaders again declined to play in 2026, stating that the organization did not have the ownership capital to launch properly, but insisted it was still planning to launch in 2027. The team held a press conference on June 10, 2026 announcing that the team was ready to launch in the 2027 season.

== Current roster ==
Stockton Crusaders roster
Quarterbacks: Currently vacant; Running backs: Currently vacant; Wide receivers: Currently vacant	Offensive linemen: Currently vacant; Defensive linemen: Currently vacant	Linebackers: Currently vacant; Defensive backs: Currently vacant; Special teams: Currently vacant	Reserve lists: Currently vacant; Rookies in italics; Roster updated November 19, 2024; 0 Active, 0 Inactive

== Staff ==
Stockton Crusaders staff
Front office: Owner - TBA; President - Scott McKibben; General manager - Greg Pearce; Head coaches: Head coach - Kurt Bryan; Offensive coaches: Offensive coordinator - TBA; Offensive coach - TBA	Defensive coaches: Defensive coordinator – TBA
