= Arena Football 1 =

Arena Football 1 may refer to either of two arena football leagues founded by Jerry Kurz:

- Arena Football League, the second incarnation of which used the working title Arena Football 1 (AF1) briefly in 2009
- Arena Football One (2025), a league that launched in 2025
