= Arena Football League Rookie of the Year =

The Arena Football League Rookie of the Year was an award given to the Arena Football League's best rookie from 1997 to 2019.

Season	Player	Team	Position
1997	Cory Fleming	Nashville Kats	WR/LB
1998	Oronde Gadsden	Portland Forest Dragons	WR/LB
1999	Charles Wilson	Tampa Bay Storm	OS
2000	Chris Jackson	Los Angeles Avengers	WR
2001	R-Kal Truluck	Detroit Fury	OL/DL
2002	Clevan Thomas	San Jose SaberCats	DB
2003	Travis McGriff	Orlando Predators	OS
2004	Adrian McPherson	Indiana Firebirds	QB
2005	Troy Bergeron	Georgia Force	WR
2006	Ben Nelson	San Jose SaberCats	WR
2007	Brett Dietz; Charles Frederick	Tampa Bay Storm; Kansas City Brigade	QB; WR/DB
2008	Donovan Morgan	Chicago Rush	WR
2010	Rod Windsor	Arizona Rattlers	WR
2011	Maurice Purify	Georgia Force	WR
2012	Jared Perry	Chicago Rush	WR/DB
2013	Mario Urrutia	Utah Blaze	WR
2014	Greg Carr	Orlando Predators	WR
2015	Greg Reid	Jacksonville Sharks	DB
2016	Marvin Ross	Cleveland Gladiators	DB
2017	Shane Carden	Baltimore Brigade	QB
2018	Malachi Jones	Albany Empire	WR
2019	Fabian Guerra; Antwane Grant	Columbus Destroyers; Atlantic City Blackjacks	WR; WR
