= San Diego Stealth =

American indoor football team

Logo

General information
- Founded: 2025
- Headquartered: San Diego, California, U.S.
- Colors: Blue, Silver, Black
- OceansideBombers.com

Personnel
- Owners: Alberto and Margaret Gean
- Head coach: Clark Bartram

Team history
- Oceanside Bombers (2026); Oceanside Stealth (July–September 2026); San Diego Stealth (2027)

Home fields
- Frontwave Arena (2026); Pechanga Arena (2027)

League / conference affiliations
- Arena Football One (2026 onward)

The San Diego Stealth are a professional arena football team based in San Diego, California, that competes in Arena Football One (AF1). The team plays its home games at Pechanga Arena.

== History ==
=== Arena Football One (2026) ===
Oceanside Bombers for a majority of the 2026 expansion season.

On November 12, 2025, AF1 officials and local community leaders welcomed the league's newest expansion team, the Oceanside Bombers despite unsubstantiated leaks brought forth by independent journalists that were dismissed initially as rumors. Oceanside mayor Esther C. Sanchez was quoted as saying, “This is a proud day for Oceanside.”

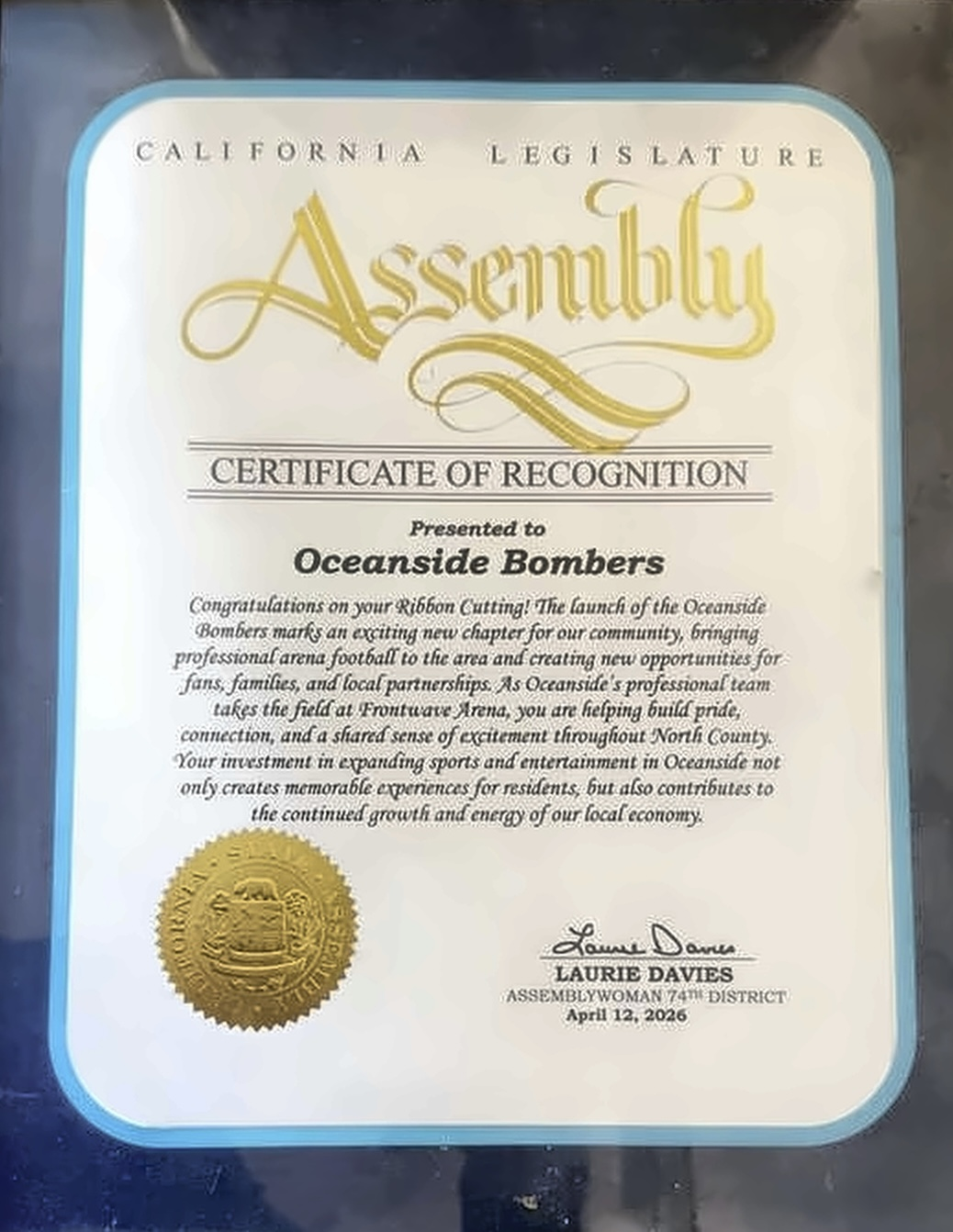
California Assembly Recognition - Oceanside Bombers Arena Football Team

The Bombers were the only AF1 franchise that directly competed in the same market (and arena) as an Indoor Football League franchise in 2026, as the IFL's San Diego Strike Force holds the lease on Oceanside's main indoor arena, Frontwave Arena, through 2027.

On July 13, 2026, the team was sold to Alberto and Margaret Gean, who—while the Bombers' season was still ongoing—changed the team's name to the Oceanside Stealth. After the 2026 season, the team moved to Pechanga Arena in San Diego, rebranding once more to the San Diego Stealth.
