= Pechanga Arena =

Arena in San Diego, California, United States

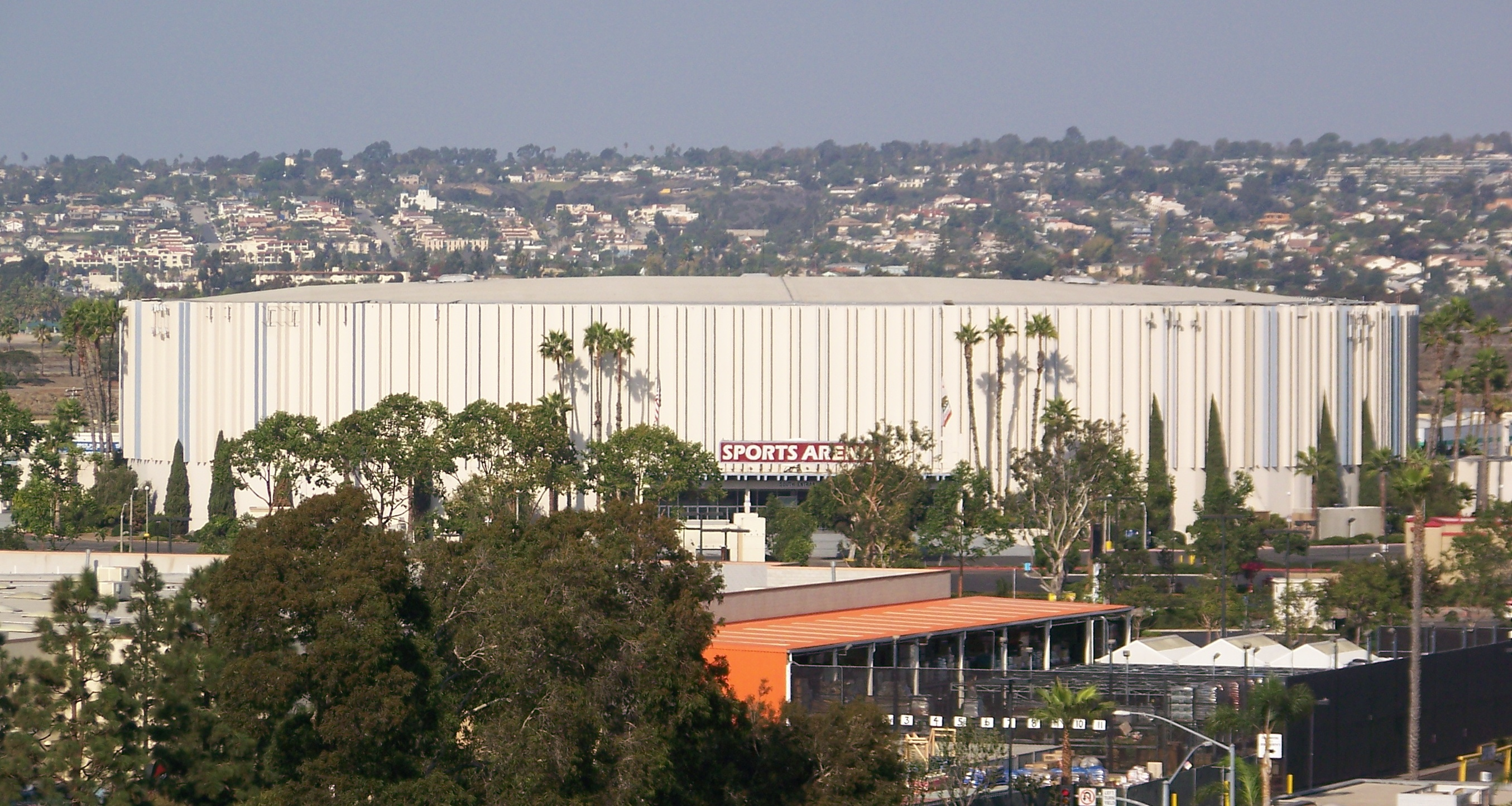

- Location within California Location within the United States
- Former names: San Diego International Sports Arena (1966–70); San Diego Sports Arena (1970–2005; 2007–10) iPayOne Center (2005–07); Valley View Casino Center (2010–18)
- Address: 3500 Sports Arena Blvd
- Location: San Diego, California, U.S.
- Coordinates: 32°45′19″N 117°12′44″W
- Owner: City of San Diego
- Operator: ASM Global
- Capacity: Boxing: 16,100; Basketball: 14,500; Ice hockey: 12,920

Construction
- Groundbreaking: November 18, 1965
- Opened: November 17, 1966
- Cost: US$6.4 million ($65.4 million in 2025 dollars)
- Architect: Mark L. Faddis
- Structural engineer: Richard Bradshaw
- General contractor: Trepte Construction Company

Tenants
- Basketball San Diego Rockets (NBA) (1967–71); San Diego Conquistadors/Sails (ABA) (1974–75); San Diego Clippers (NBA) (1978–84); San Diego Wildcards (CBA) (1995–96); San Diego Stingrays (IBL) (1999–2001) Ice Hockey San Diego Gulls (WHL) (1966–74); San Diego Mariners (WHA) (1974–77); San Diego Hawks (PHL) (1978–79); San Diego Gulls (IHL) (1990–95); San Diego Gulls (WCHL/ECHL) (1995–2006); San Diego Gulls (AHL) (2015–present) Indoor Football San Diego Riptide (AF2) (2002–05); San Diego Seduction (LFL) (2009–10); San Diego Strike Force (IFL) (2019–24); San Diego Stealth (AF1) (2027–present) Indoor Soccer San Diego Sockers (NASL/MISL I/CISL) (1980–96); San Diego Sockers (WISL/MISL II) (2001–04); San Diego Sockers (MASL) (2012–24); San Diego Sockers 2 (M2) (2017–19, 2021–24) Lacrosse San Diego Seals (NLL) (2018–26) Roller Hockey San Diego Barracudas (RHI) (1993–96) Tennis San Diego Friars (WTT) (1975–78); San Diego Friars/Buds (WTT) (1981–85); San Diego Aviators (WTT) (2014)

Website
- pechangaarenasd.com

Pechanga Arena is an indoor arena in San Diego, California. Opened in 1966, it is an example of New Formalism architecture and has been designated by the City of San Diego as a historic resource. The arena has been home to numerous athletic teams in various sports. It is the home of the San Diego Gulls of the American Hockey League (AHL).

The arena was the home of the National Basketball Association's (NBA) San Diego Rockets from 1967 to 1971 and San Diego Clippers from 1978 to 1984. It hosted the 1971 NBA All-Star Game and the 1973 Muhammad Ali vs. Ken Norton boxing fight. In 2013, U-T San Diego named the arena third on its list of the fifty most notable locations in San Diego sports history.

In June 2023, Stan Kroenke's development group, the Kroenke Group, announced that it would be the chief investor for the redevelopment of the site; a project known as Midway Rising. The proposal includes the demolition of Pechanga Arena, in order to build a new 16,000-seat arena, housing units, a multi-acre urban park, and a mixed-use entertainment, arts, and cultural district.

Following years of delays, the signing of Senate Bill 958 and Senate Bill 344 will allow the Midway Rising redevelopment to progress. Both bills change how the California Environmental Quality Act affects the Midway Rising development. Midway Rising project spokesperson Jeff Meyer stated that by the end of 2027, they will be able to advance forward. This project will allow the addition of 4,254 new homes, 14.5 acres of open space, and a 16,000 seat entertainment center.

== History ==
The arena was built in 1966 for $6.4 million by Bob Breitbard, a local football player who played for the San Diego State Aztecs. To build the arena, the city knocked down a housing project that had been there since 1943. The arena seated 13,000 for hockey and 13,700 for basketball. At 77 feet tall, the arena was built six years before the current 30 foot maximum height restriction was put into place by the State Coastal Commission in the Midway-Pacific Highway Community Plan.

The arena opened on November 17, 1966, when more than 11,000 pro hockey fans watched the San Diego Gulls (then a member of the Western Hockey League) win their season opener, 4–1, against the Seattle Totems.

In 2013, U-T San Diego named the arena third on its list of the fifty most notable locations in San Diego sports history.

=== Naming history ===
The arena has had multiple names:

- San Diego International Sports Arena (November 17, 1966—1970)
- San Diego Sports Arena (1970—March 19, 2005; May 9, 2007—November 12, 2010; December 1, 2018—December 5, 2018)
- iPayOne Center (March 20, 2005—May 8, 2007)
- Valley View Casino Center (November 13, 2010—November 30, 2018)
- Pechanga Arena (December 5, 2018—present)

iPayOne, a real estate savings company based in Carlsbad, California, held the arena's naming rights from 2004 until 2007. The deal was worth $2.5 million over five years. In April 2007 the leasing rights holder Arena Group 2000 cancelled the remainder of the contract due to non-payment by iPayOne.

On October 12, 2010, it was announced that the arena's name had been changed to the "Valley View Casino Center", under a $1.5 million, 5-year agreement between the arena operator AEG, the San Pasqual Band of Diegueno Mission Indians and the city of San Diego.

Valley View Casino's naming rights expired November 30, 2018, leaving the arena without an official name until the city council announced on December 4, 2018, that the Pechanga Band of Luiseño Indians, owners of Pechanga Resort Casino in Temecula, had acquired for $400,000 per year the naming rights to the arena, officially renaming it "Pechanga Arena". The agreement expired in May 2020.

== Events ==
=== Sports ===
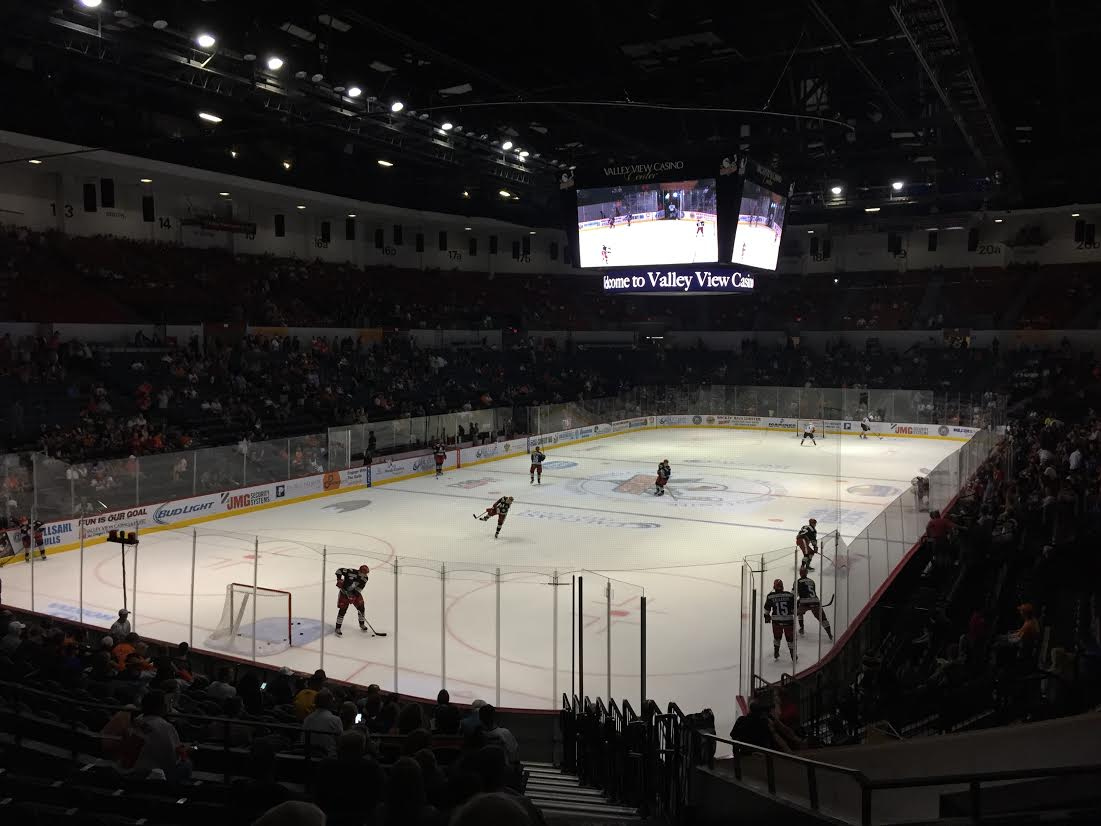
San Diego Gulls pregame in October 2015 after renovations with arena in hockey configuration

The arena seats 12,000 for indoor football, 12,920 for ice hockey, indoor soccer and box lacrosse, 14,500 for basketball and tennis, 5,450 for amphitheater concerts and stage shows, 8,900–14,800 for arena concerts, 13,000 for ice shows and the circus, and 16,100 for boxing and mixed martial arts.

The arena opened on November 17, 1966, with the San Diego Gulls (then a member of the Western Hockey League) winning their season opener, 4–1, against the Seattle Totems. The Gulls were the arena's first tenant. The San Diego State Aztecs men's basketball team join the Gulls on a part-time basis soon afterwards; they played home games at the arena off-and-on to supplement their on-campus, much smaller venue, Peterson Gymnasium. The Aztecs played at the arena until 1997, when they opened their new on-campus venue, Viejas Arena.

On October 14, 1967, an NBA expansion team, the San Diego Rockets, became the arena's first professional basketball tenant when they played their season opener and first game in franchise history against the St. Louis Hawks, narrowly losing 98–99.

On January 12, 1971, the Rockets hosted the 1971 NBA All-Star Game at the arena.

At the conclusion of the 1970–71 NBA Season, the Rockets were sold and relocated to Houston. As a result, San Francisco Warriors owner Franklin Mieuli, who was looking for more support for his franchise, decided to make a play for the San Diego market (in addition to the Oakland market, where Oakland Arena had just received a renovation project). Mieuli changed his team's name to the Golden State Warriors for the upcoming season in order to target the state of California as a whole for a fanbase, instead of a single metropolitan area. The Warriors planned to split the season's home games between the San Francisco Bay Area and San Diego. The Warriors ultimately hosted just six regular season home games at the San Diego Sports Arena, one each month of the 1971–72 season (October–March). The remainder of the Warriors' home games that season were played at Oakland Arena, where the Warriors settled full-time the following season.

As the Warriors returned to the Bay Area full-time after their brief experiment in San Diego, the NBA's primary competitor league, the American Basketball Association (ABA) awarded its first—and as it turned out, only—expansion team to San Diego. Dr. Leonard Bloom (President and CEO of the United States Capital Corporation) paid a $1 million expansion fee to the league to start the team. The San Diego Conquistadors began play in the 1972–73 ABA season; however, they were unable to use the Sports Arena for their first two seasons of existence due to a feud between Bloom and Peter Graham, manager of the city-owned 14,400-seat Sports Arena. The Conquistadors (or "Q's" as they were commonly known locally and in the ABA community), played at Peterson Gymnasium on the campus of San Diego State University from 1972 until 1974 as a result of the feud.

In late 1974, the Q's were finally allowed to use the Sports Arena, but their first season at the arena would turn out to be their only full season there. In 1975, the ABA, facing mounting financial difficulties, was rumored to be discussing a merger with the NBA and the San Diego franchise was not to be included. The Conquistadors, freshly renamed the Sails, would cease operations just 11 games into the 1975–76 ABA season on November 12, 1975, when the ABA announced that it was folding the San Diego Sails franchise. The Sails were scheduled to host the Indiana Pacers on that day but the game was not played.

In 1972, the Republican Party considered the arena for its National Convention. With little warning, however, the GOP decided to hold the convention in Miami Beach. To compensate for this blow to local prestige, then-mayor (and future California governor) Pete Wilson gave San Diego the by-name of "America's Finest City", which is still the city's official moniker.

The arena was the host of the 1973 Muhammad Ali vs. Ken Norton boxing fight, which, by split decision, San Diego resident Norton won.

The 1975 NCAA men's basketball Final Four was held at the arena from March 15, 1975, until the national championship game on March 31, where UCLA was victorious in John Wooden's final game.

In 1978, less than three years after the Sails folded and the ABA's four surviving teams merged with the NBA, the NBA returned to San Diego with the relocation of the Buffalo Braves, which became the San Diego Clippers. In 1981, the Clippers were bought by Los Angeles-based developer Donald Sterling. Sterling, despite failing to gain approval from the NBA to relocate the team to Los Angeles in 1982 and again in 1984, did so anyway following the 1983–84 NBA season, which led to a lawsuit from the league. The team ultimately remained in Los Angeles, however, following a counter-lawsuit brought on by Sterling. The franchise has kept the Clippers name despite its reference being to the ships of San Diego Bay. San Diego has not hosted an NBA regular game since the Clippers' departure.

In both 1979 and 1981 at the San Diego Indoor Track Meet, Irish distance runner Eamonn Coghlan broke the world record for the indoor mile with times of 3:52.6 and 3:50.6 respectively. A photo of him crossing the finish line appeared around the world including on the cover of Sports Illustrated. Coghlan's time for the 1981 race would remain as the world record until 1983, when he improved upon his own record with a time of 3:49.78 at New Jersey's Meadowlands Arena indoor arena. Coghlan held the indoor mile world record for 17 years and 11 months before Moroccan distance runner Hicham El Guerrouj broke the world record in 1997 with a time of 3:48.45.

The arena has also been home of the San Diego Mariners of the World Hockey Association from 1974 to 1977, the San Diego Friars of World Team Tennis (WTT) from 1975 to 1978, the San Diego Sockers indoor soccer team, which won 10 titles in the arena, and other minor professional sports franchises. The San Diego Sockers made their return to the arena in 2012 for their fourth season in the PASL-Pro from Del Mar Arena. The San Diego Aviators of WTT relocated from New York City prior to the 2014 season and began playing their home matches in the arena. On December 29, 2014, the Aviators announced that the team would move its home matches to Omni La Costa Resort & Spa in nearby Carlsbad for the 2015 season.

The arena has hosted a series of UFC events. The arena hosted UFC Live: Jones vs. Matyushenko on August 1, 2010. The arena hosted UFC Fight Night: Mir vs. Duffee on July 15, 2015. The arena hosted UFC on ESPN: Vera vs. Cruz on August 13, 2022.

In 2015, the Anaheim Ducks relocated their American Hockey League (AHL) affiliate to San Diego to become the current iteration of the San Diego Gulls, using the arena for their home games.

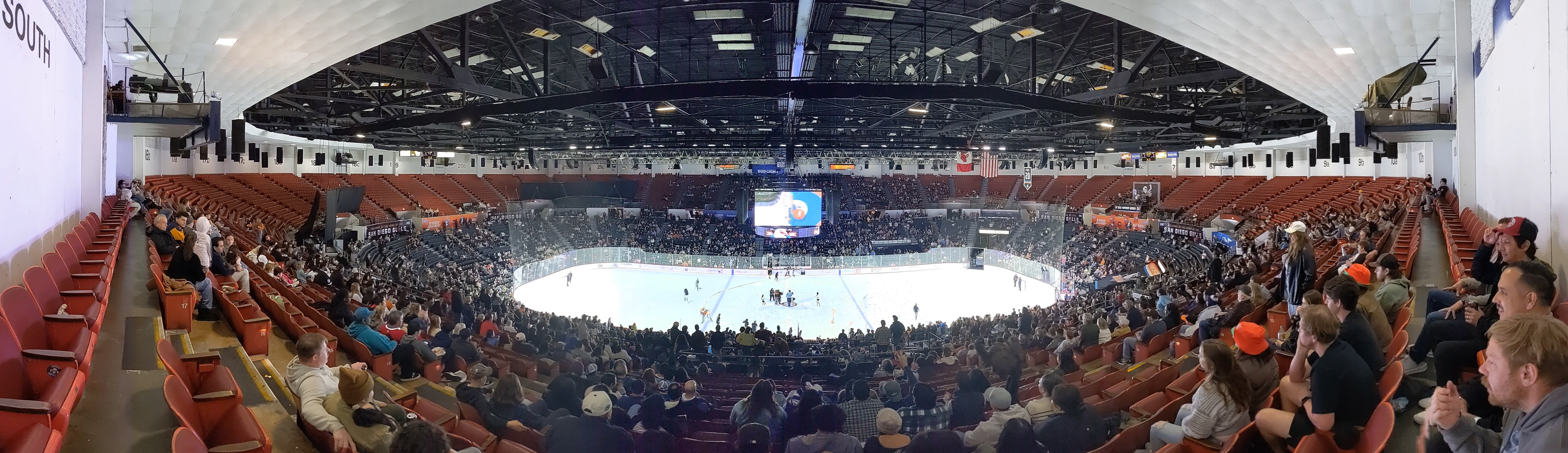
Panoramic view of Pechanga Arena in hockey configuration in 2026

On August 7, 2016, the arena played host to the Arena Football League's Los Angeles Kiss as they faced the Cleveland Gladiators in the first round of the AFL playoffs. The game was moved to San Diego due to the Kiss' home arena, the Honda Center in Anaheim hosting the Ringling Brothers and Barnum and Bailey Circus that weekend. The Kiss would lose to the Gladiators 56–52 in front of a crowd of 4,692. It was the first AFL game ever to be played at the arena and the first arena football game played there since 2005, when the AF2's San Diego Riptide played their home games at the arena from 2002 to 2005.

On August 29, 2017, the National Lacrosse League (NLL) announced that billionaire owner Joseph Tsai of Alibaba had been awarded an NLL franchise to begin playing in November 2018 for the 2018–2019 season. The team is known as the San Diego Seals. However, on August 21, 2026, the NLL announced that the Seals would move to Frontwave Arena for the coming season.

In November 2018, the Indoor Football League (IFL) announced an expansion team for the 2019 season called the San Diego Strike Force. The IFL became the top level of professional indoor football in November 2019 when the Arena Football League announced it was folding. The Strike Force left for Frontwave Arena beginning in 2025. Arena football in its classic configuration will return to the arena in 2027 when the San Diego Stealth (formerly the Oceanside Bombers) move in after playing its first season at Frontwave Arena.

The Bill Walton Classic, a college basketball doubleheader created in tribute to San Diegan and former Clippers player Bill Walton, was held in 2026.

=== Concerts ===
The Stone Poneys played there on January 13, 1968.

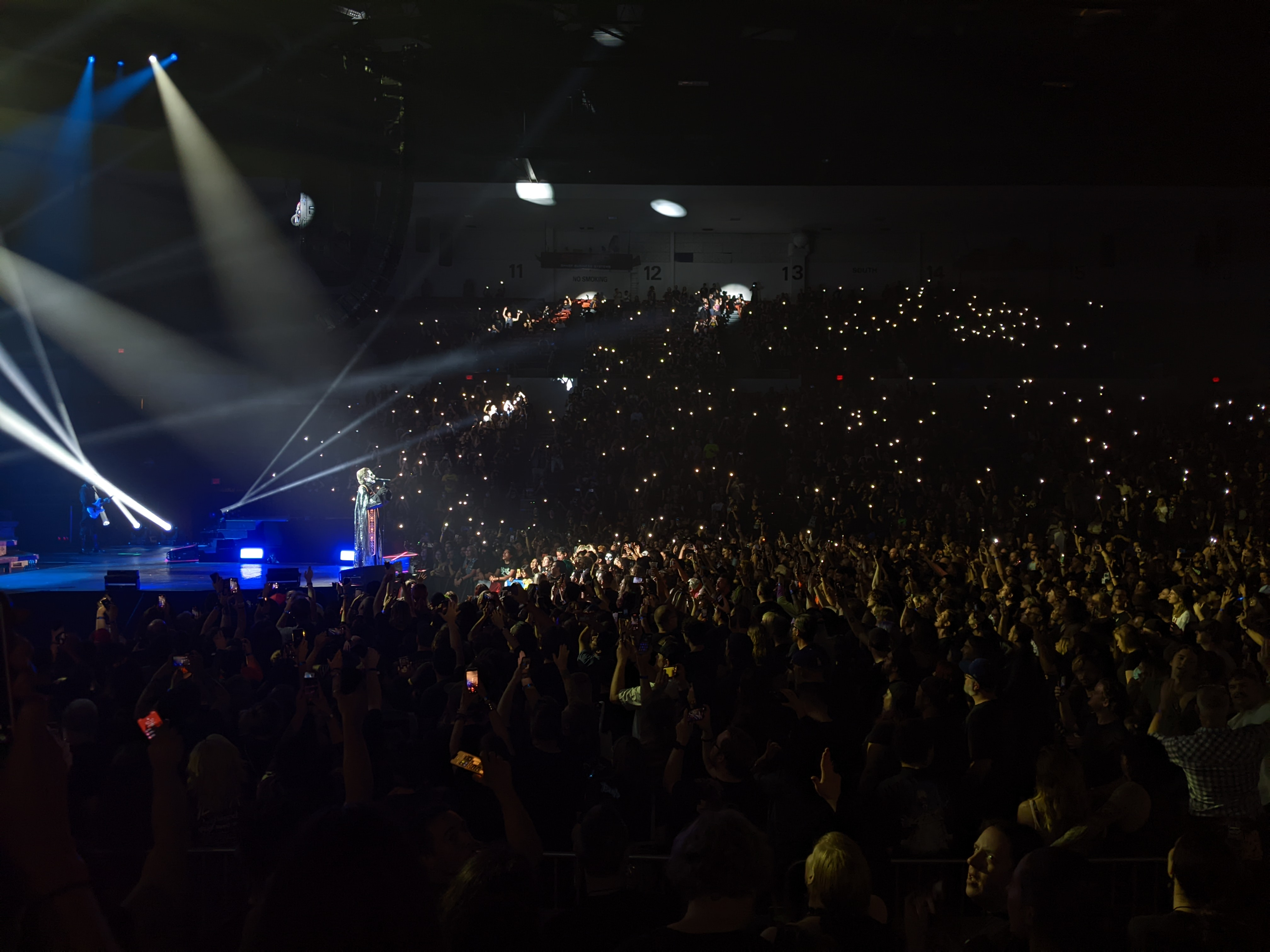
Ghost performing at the arena in 2022

Led Zeppelin, Jethro Tull, and Surprise Package played there on August 10, 1969.

Jimi Hendrix recorded his 13-minute jam version of "Red House" there, on May 24, 1969. The full concert was released in 1991 as part of the Stages box set.

Elvis Presley played there on November 15, 1970, and April 24, 1976. Attendance was 14,659 in 1970 and 17,500 in 1976.

The Rolling Stones with Stevie Wonder played there on June 13, 1972.

The Grateful Dead played there a total of 4 times from 1973 to 1993. The November 14, 1973 performance has been released as part of the band's 30 Trips Around the Sun box set. Following the band's July 1, 1980 performance, drummer Mickey Hart, rhythm guitarist Bob Weir and their manager were arrested for interfering with a police bust.

Queen performed there four times to sold-out crowds. Their first concert was on March 12, 1976, for their A Night at the Opera Tour which was the band's first headline tour in the US. They next performed on March 5, 1977, as part of their A Day at the Races Tour. Their next concert was during their News of the World Tour on December 16, 1977. The band's last performance was on July 5, 1980, while on The Game Tour.

The gatefold photograph inside Kiss' album Alive II was shot there during soundcheck before their show at the SDSA on August 19, 1977, during the "Love Gun" tour.

Alice Cooper played there on many occasions and it was the venue for his concert film The Strange Case of Alice Cooper in 1979.

The Bee Gees played to a sold-out crowd on July 5, 1979, during their Spirits Having Flown Tour.

ABBA played there during their 1979 world tour.

Bob Marley and The Wailers performed there on November 21, 1979, Survival Tour.

Heart performed there on August 24, 1980. The band's Greatest Hits/Live included a medley of "I'm Down" and "Long Tall Sally" recorded at the show.

Duran Duran played two nights there on April 16, 1984, and April 17, 1984, as part of their Sing Blue Silver World Tour. They played there again July 28, 1987, as part of their Strange Behaviour World Tour; also that night American all-female band The Bangles joined them on stage to sing their hit "If She Knew What She Wants". They also played there on February 25, 2005, as part of their Astronaut World Tour when they reformed the band to its original lineup.

The German heavy metal rock group The Scorpions performed there during their 1984 World Wide live tour.

Rush performed there on May 28, 1984, as part of their Grace Under Pressure Tour.

Van Halen played two shows on May 20 and 21 on their 1984 Tour; two shows on their 1986 5150 Tour on June 28 and 29, 1986; a show on their 1988 OU812 tour on November 19, 1988; two shows on their For Unlawful Carnal Knowledge Tour on May 1 and 3, 1992; and finally on their 1995 The Balance "Ambulance" Tour on April 2, 1995.

Dio performed during their Sacred Heart Tour on December 6, 1985. The show was recorded and later released as a live album, entitled Intermission.

Bon Jovi played a sold-out show on January 16, 1987, on their Slippery When Wet world tour.

Aerosmith performed during their Pump Tour on March 2, 1990.

Janet Jackson has performed six concerts at this venue. She performed a sold-out show on April 23, 1990, for her Rhythm Nation Tour. She returned to the venue on February 24, 1994, for the Janet World Tour, another sold-out show. She performed sold-out shows for her The Velvet Rope Tour and All for You Tour. She came back on September 20, 2008, for her Rock Witchu Tour. She played a date here on October 7, 2017, during her State of the World Tour.

MC Hammer played at the arena on August 4, 1990, as part of his Please Hammer Don't Hurt 'Em World Tour. He also played on June 28, 1992, for his Too Legit to Quit World Tour.

Gloria Estefan and the Miami Sound Machine played there on three occasions, first on July 17, 1991, during her “Into The Light World Tour,” second on July 31, 1996, during her “Evolution World Tour,” and third on August 19, 2004, during her “Live & Re-Wrapped Tour”.

Metallica performed two consecutive shows, during their Wherever We May Roam Tour, on January 13–14, 1992. The shows were recorded and later released on VHS and DVD, entitled Live Shit: Binge & Purge on November 23, 1993.

Nirvana performed during their In Utero tour on December 29, 1993.

Diana Ross was scheduled to perform during her Return to Love Tour on August 2, 2000, but the show was cancelled, due to low ticket sales.

Tina Turner was scheduled to perform during her Twenty Four Seven Tour on December 2, 2000, with Joe Cocker as her opening act, but the show was canceled.

Britney Spears opened her 2004 Onyx Hotel Tour.

U2 performed at the venue for the first two shows of their Vertigo Tour on March 28 and 30, 2005.

Miley Cyrus performed at the arena on November 8, 2007, during her Best of Both Worlds Tour.

Lady Gaga performed at the arena on December 19, 2009, during her Monster Ball Tour.

Eric Clapton performed at the venue on March 15, 2007, with special guests JJ Cale, Doyle Bramhall II, Derek Trucks, and Robert Cray. Nine years later, Clapton released audio and video/DVD recordings of the show in honor of Cale, who died in 2013, on the live album Live in San Diego.

Britney Spears performed during The Circus Starring Britney Spears at the arena on September 24, 2009.

Justin Bieber performed a sold-out show there on October 30, 2010, as part of his My World Tour; three years later he performed there again to a sold-out show on June 22, 2013, during his Believe Tour. Bieber returned there on March 29, 2016, to perform to a sold-out show as part of his Purpose World Tour, and on February 18, 2022, Bieber returned there for his Justice World Tour.

LMFAO performed for their Sorry for Party Rocking Tour June 9, 2012.

Selena Gomez performed at the arena on November 8, 2013, during her Stars Dance Tour.

Madonna played a date there on October 29, 2015, becoming her first-ever performance in the arena, during her Rebel Heart Tour. The show sold 10,500 seats and grossed over $1.6 million with ticket prices ranging from $50 to $355, becoming one of the most expensive concerts.

Muse played multiple dates there for tours, including The 2nd Law World Tour in 2013, Drones World Tour in 2016, and the Simulation Theory World Tour in 2019.

Jason Aldean played a date there late in 2016, on his Six-String Nation Tour.

Sheryl Crow, Bob Dylan, and Willie Nelson played a date there in September 2017 as part of their Outlaw Music Festival tour.

Tyler, The Creator performed at the venue on February 2, 2018, as part of a run of headlining North American tour in support of his recently released album Flower Boy.

Lana Del Rey performed at the venue on February 15, 2018, as part of her LA to the Moon Tour, with support from Kali Uchis.

Maluma performed at the venue on April 8, 2018, as part of his F.A.M.E tour.

Slayer kicked off their final tour there on May 10, 2018, with support from Lamb of God, Anthrax, Behemoth, and Testament.

Shakira performed at the venue on September 5, 2018, as part of her El Dorado World Tour.

Local radio station KHTS-FM held its annual "Summer Kickoff Concert" at the venue on May 31, 2019. It featured Halsey, Ellie Goulding, CNCO, Bebe Rexha, NCT 127, and five other artists.

Jennifer Lopez performed at the arena on June 10, 2019, as part of her It's My Party Tour.

Country-pop singer Carrie Underwood has performed in the arena multiple times, first on October 1, 2010, during her Play On Tour; the second on October 20, 2012, during her Blown Away Tour; the third on September 16, 2016, during her Storyteller Tour: Stories in the Round; and the fourth on September 10, 2019, during her Cry Pretty Tour 360, making her one of the artists with the most performances in the arena.

Tame Impala played the first of their The Slow Rush Tour concerts there on March 9, 2020, just prior to the shutdown due to the Coronavirus pandemic. They would return to the arena five years later on November 9, 2025, for their Deadbeat Tour.

Harry Styles performed at the arena on November 15, 2021, as part of his Love On Tour.

Bad Bunny brought his El Ultimo Tour Del Mundo to Pechanga on February 23, 2022, selling out the arena. Previously, Bad Bunny played at the arena on November 22, 2019, as part of his X 100Pre Tour and on August 25, 2018, as part of his La Nueva Religión Tour.

AJR headlined the arena for the first time on May 1, 2024, for their The Maybe Man Tour.

=== Other events ===
The arena has hosted several WWE events, including many episodes of Raw and SmackDown, some ECW episodes, one episode of the original NXT, and a litany of house shows. As well as Vengeance 2001, which saw the unification of the World Championship and WWF Championship into the Undisputed WWF Championship, Taboo Tuesday 2005, and One Night Stand 2008.

The 2011 version of Wrex the Halls was hosted here over two days with headliners Florence and the Machine and Blink-182 headlining respective nights. Both nights were sold out.

The arena has also been home to events of the original Roller Games league, featuring its flagship team, the Los Angeles Thunderbirds, as well as the alternating roller derby leagues of the time, featuring their flagship team, the San Francisco Bay Bombers.

The arena hosted Hot Wheels Monster Trucks Live in 2019.

== Arena's future ==
As use of the arena for sports and entertainment declined during the 1990s and 2000s, the city considered plans to redevelop the property. A Request For Proposals (RFP) was issued, and in August 2020 Mayor Kevin Faulconer announced that the city had chosen a developer to convert the arena and its surrounding 48 acres into an entertainment district. The proposed plan would include a new sports arena, thousands of housing units, and retail and park space.

In a November 2020 election, the city's voters removed a pre-existing height limit of 30 feet on structures in the area, giving developers more flexibility. However, in June 2021, the California Department of Housing and Community Development (HCD) notified the city that the plan violated the state's recently modified Surplus Land Act, which mandates that local governments must offer surplus land first to developers who will reserve 25% of housing units for low-income families. In July the city prepared to declare the property surplus, meaning not needed for the city's use, with the condition that any proposal should include refurbishing or replacing the sports arena as an entertainment venue. If the state HCD approves that condition, the city will issue a new RFP to a state-approved list of affordable housing developers. The November 2022 election again has Measure E on the ballot for San Diego voters to remove or preserve the current height restrictions for the neighborhood zone west of the I-5 freeway and south of I-8 down to San Diego International Airport including Liberty Station and Marine Corps Recruit Depot San Diego.

Three developers proposed a new mixed use arena with housing, shopping, and parks. The projects were titled "Midway Rising", "Hometown SD", and "Midway Village+", with Midway Rising eventually winning the bid. In 2023, Stan Kroenke joined the Midway Rising group as a majority investor, bringing a massive boost as he had previously redeveloped the former Hollywood Park Racetrack in Inglewood.
