= Arizona Bandits =

American indoor football team

Logo

General information
- Founded: 2023
- Folded: 2025
- Headquartered: Tempe, Arizona
- Colors: Lime Green, Black, Silver & White
- ArizonaBandits.com (inactive)

Personnel
- Owners: Matthew Mason, David Glynn and Tim Carbajal
- Head coach: Chad DeGrenier
- President: Matthew Mason

Team history
- Arizona Bandits (never played)

League / conference affiliations
- Arena Football One (never played)

The Arizona Bandits were a planned professional indoor football team to be based in Tempe, Arizona. They were announced as one of the inaugural teams for the revived Arena Football League (AFL) and later Arena Football One (AF1), but never played in either league.

== History ==
Original introductory logo from 2023

The Bandits were slated to be the second official Arizona-based team to play in the AFL and the first since the Arizona Rattlers who played in the original AFL from 1992 to 2016; the Rattlers are still in operation in the same metropolitan area, playing out of Glendale in the Indoor Football League. It was one of two metropolitan areas in which the revived AFL had planned to economically compete with another established indoor franchise (the other being the Iowa Rampage, who were to play across the river from the longstanding Omaha Beef).

=== Arena Football League ===
On February 1, 2023, a revival of the AFL announced its intent to relaunch in 2024. On July 18, the 16 intended market cities were announced, but Arizona wasn't among said markets.

On September 6, 2023, the Bandits launched their Facebook and Instagram pages with new logos and news about the ownership group, which is led by local businessmen Matthew Mason and David Glynn, along with Bakersfield, California-based semi-professional team owner Tim Carbajal. Carbajal had originally been in line to own the California Grizzlies (California was one the markets announced by the league), but was unable to secure a lease with Bakersfield's Mechanics Bank Arena. Their head coach and general manager is former San Jose SaberCats and Bay Area Panthers head coach Darren Arbet, who won four ArenaBowl championships with the SaberCats before that franchise abruptly folded in 2015. On November 16, 2023, the Bandits were among the team that attended a special AFL Launch Party in New York City.

In an interview with KTVK 3TV and KPHO CBS 5, co-owner Matthew Mason announced that the Bandits will be playing in a new state-of-the-art arena in either Phoenix or Scottsdale that could also host a potential revival of the Arizona Coyotes of the National Hockey League. In May 2024, the Arizona State Land Department blocked the sale of the land upon which the arena would have been built, effectively ending efforts to build the new arena and the Coyotes themselves.

The league did not include the Bandits in its 2024 schedule. On May 14, 2024, the league fired commissioner Lee Hutton and contracted to 10 teams. Arbet would join the Nashville Kats for 2025.

=== Arena Football One ===
On September 4, 2024, concurrent with the other eight surviving AFL teams, the Bandits posted a teaser video, but the Bandits' teaser did not match that of the other teams (whereas the other teams' message read "A new era begins today", the Bandits' instead read "Something big is coming.") The Bandits were not included among the eight teams that are expected to be included in Arena Football One, a successor league being formed by the surviving AFL members by leaving the current AFL and forming a new league. AF1 did indicate that there would be expansion teams joining before 2025, possibly including the Bandits. In late September, the owner of another AF1 team, the Albany Firebirds, Mike Kwarta confirmed that the twelfth AF1 team would be Arizona and would be announced the last week of that month. The league issued a statement that week that did not announce any expansion teams, but warned against any prospective teams making premature announcements before the league thoroughly vetted and approved any expansion bids (this was not targeted specifically at the Bandits; another prospective franchise, the Las Vegas Kings, had repeatedly made false claims about being invited to join the league). The Bandits were among the organizations who were identified at the league's "Arena Football University" clinic that week along with other prospective bidders, an invitation the league stated "should not be taken as a guarantee of admission to AF1." In late October, AF1 indicated a final decision on the Bandits' and other teams' bids for expansion would come in early November after the application deadline was extended to October 31. The league updated the situation again on November 13 stating that whether or not the Bandits or any other teams would be added would come "in the coming days".

On November 15, 2024, the Bandits were officially announced as the 14th franchise in AF1 and will be based out of and would play their home games in Tempe. Tempe's lone arena, Mullett Arena, is on the campus of Arizona State University and most recently was renovated to host the NHL's Arizona Coyotes from 2022 until the Coyotes were coerced into leaving the undersized (by NHL standards) arena to become the Utah Mammoth in 2024. On December 16, 2024, it was announced that Phoenix native and former Arizona Rattlers quarterback Chad DeGrenier would serve as the Bandits' head coach for their inaugural season.

The Bandits cancelled a preseason scrimmage against the non-league Las Vegas Kings that was to be played March 1 at Pinnacle High School; by early March, no agreement with Mullett Arena had yet been secured. On March 8, the league announced that the Bandits would be unable to compete in the 2025 season. A statement from the Bandits indicated that lack of sponsorship support would have left the team unable to meet its payroll and other obligations had they attempted to play out the season and that "we wish the league nothing but the best moving forward" with hopes of returning at some point in the future. However, the team went silent after the message, with all their social media going inactive. As of 2025, they have officially folded and were replaced by the Arizona Juggernauts of the International Arena League in 2026.

== Current roster ==
Arizona Bandits roster
Quarterbacks Malik Henry Edward Scott Running backs: Currently vacant; Wide receivers: Currently vacant	Offensive linemen: Currently vacant; Defensive linemen: Currently vacant	Linebackers: Currently vacant; Defensive backs: Currently vacant; Special teams: Currently vacant	Reserve lists: Currently vacant; Rookies in italics; Roster updated March 11, 2025; 0 Active, 0 Inactive

== Staff ==
Arizona Bandits staff
Front office: Co-Owner - Matthew Mason/President; Co-Owner - David Glynn; Co-Owner - Tim Carbajal; General manager - TBA; Head coaches: Head coach - Chad DeGrenier; Offensive coaches: Offensive coordinator - TBA; Offensive coach - TBA	Defensive coaches: Defensive coordinator – TBA
