= Georgia Force (2024) =

Arena football team

Logo

General information
- Founded: 2024
- Folded: 2024
- Headquartered: Georgia State Convocation Center in Atlanta, Georgia
- Colors: Blue, black, white

Personnel
- Owners: Arena Football Management, LLC
- Head coach: Durwood Roquemore

Home fields
- Georgia State Convocation Center (2024)

League / conference affiliations
- Arena Football League (2024): South (2024)

The Georgia Force were a professional arena football team based in the Atlanta Metropolitan Area of Georgia, United States. They competed in the 2024 version of the Arena Football League (AFL). The Force were based on a previous team by the same name that played in the original Arena Football League from 2002 to 2012.

== History ==
In November 2023, the Force was announced as a member of the reconstituted Arena Football League beginning play in 2024, as an expansion team under the ownership of Southern Indoor Sports Management Company with no ties to the original AFL's Georgia Force. The Force quietly revealed that they would be coached by AFL Hall of Famer Durwood Roquemore for the 2024 season. They were originally slated to play home games at the Georgia State Convocation Center at Georgia State University in Atlanta, although this never came to fruition. Being unable to secure a home venue, the league scheduled the franchise as a traveling team playing every game in 2024 as a visitor.

On May 10, 2024, Force quarterback Justin Arth, who had been financing some of the players' meals through his private coaching business, indicated that the Force had abruptly folded after two games and that his teammates were facing eviction by the end of the week, prompting him to launch a fundraising drive to pay for his teammates' return home. In an extended interview with Front Office Sports, Arth indicated that Roquemore informed the team on May 9 that the league had run out of money and was shutting down the team.
