= Philadelphia Soul (2024) =

Arena football team

- Established 2024; Folded 2024; Played in Philadelphia, Pennsylvania, U.S. (Note: Scheduled to play three games at the CURE Insurance Arena in Trenton, New Jersey, before the team folded in May 2024.)

League/conference affiliations
- Arena Football League (2024)
- Current uniform
- Team colors: Light blue, black, white

Personnel
- Owner(s): Arena Football Management, LLC (majority); Up 1 Athletic Showcase
- General manager: Kelly Logan
- Head coach: Tyrone Washington

Team history
- Philadelphia Soul (2024)

Championships
- League championships (0)
- Conference championships (0)
- Division championships (0)

Home arena(s)
- CURE Insurance Arena (Trenton, New Jersey) (3 games) (Note: Never played)

The Philadelphia Soul was a professional arena football team based in Philadelphia that competed in the 2024 version of the Arena Football League (AFL). The Soul were based on a previous team by the same name that played in the original Arena Football League from 2004 to 2019. The ownership of the new AFL announced on July 19, 2023, that they planned to bring back the Soul in 2024 under new ownership. In May of 2024, the Soul folded for the rest of the season after playing only two games.

== History ==
On July 20, 2023, new AFL commissioner Lee Hutton stated to The Philadelphia Inquirer that the Soul would be revived with the new league with former co-owner Ron Jaworski expected to return, if not as an owner, then as a consultant. Jaworski stated in November that, for "no particular reason," he would not be involved with the traveling team bearing the Soul's name, and that Hutton's previous claim was untrue. After some rumors circulated on social media that the Soul were facing ownership challenges, Commissioner Hutton stated that although the owners had dropped out, the League would ensure operations for the Soul. He also revealed that the team would play their 2024 home schedule at CURE Insurance Arena in Trenton, New Jersey.

Shortly before the team was slated to travel to Louisiana for its first game against the Louisiana VooDoo, head coach Patrick Pimmel and nearly the entire Soul roster resigned or were abruptly fired. The Dallas Falcons of the American Arena League played as replacement players using the Soul uniforms and identity, along with three members of the Soul who had made it to Louisiana. Starting quarterback Joe Mancuso was among those who had left the team, with his agent accusing the league of misrepresenting itself and housing the team in a Super 8 Motel in a decrepit part of the city instead of the promised apartments; Mancuso immediately returned to the Indoor Football League following the fiasco.

In May of 2024, following week 2 of the regular season General Manager Kelly Logan announced via the "TAKE THE 8 COUNT" YouTube channel that the team will cease operations for the rest of the 2024 season. While the team announced that they had plans to return in 2025, the league ceased operations before it could happen. No ownership group representing Philadelphia was among the former AFL teams who coalesced into Arena Football One in 2025.
