= Durwood Roquemore =

American football player (born 1960)

No. 38, 42, 29
- Position: Cornerback

Personal information
- Born: January 19, 1960 (age 66); Dallas, Texas, U.S.
- Listed height: 6 ft 1 in (1.85 m)
- Listed weight: 183 lb (83 kg)

Career information
- High school: South Oak Cliff (Dallas)
- College: Texas A&I
- NFL draft: 1982: 6th round, 157th overall pick

Career history
- Kansas City Chiefs (1982–1983); Houston Gamblers (1985); Chicago Bruisers (1987); Buffalo Bills (1987); Chicago Bruisers (1988); Albany Firebirds (1990); Orlando Predators (1991–1996)

Awards and highlights
- 5× First-team All-Arena (1988, 1990, 1992, 1993, 1994); AFL's 10th Anniversary Team (1996); All-ArenaBowl Team (1999); Arena Football Hall of Fame inductee (1999); AFL's 25 Greatest Players # 21 (2012)

Career NFL statistics
- Interceptions: 5
- INT yards: 134
- Touchdowns: 1
- Stats at Pro Football Reference

Career AFL statistics
- Tackles: 427
- Interceptions: 50
- Receptions: 11
- Receiving yards: 99
- Total TDs: 2
- Stats at ArenaFan.com

Durwood Clinton Roquemore (born January 19, 1960) is an American former professional football player who was a cornerback in the National Football League (NFL), United States Football League (USFL), and Arena Football League (AFL). He played college football for the Texas A&M–Kingsville Javelinas.

== Early life ==
Roquemore was born January 19, 1960, in Dallas. In 1978, he graduated from South Oak Cliff High School, where he played baseball, basketball, and football, and was named to All District and All Metro teams.

== College football ==
Roquemore played college football at Texas A&I. He was a three-year starter for the Javelinas. The team won the NAIA national championship in 1979, his first year as a starter. Starting opposite another lock-down cornerback, Darrell Green, Roquemore intercepted 10 passes his junior year, which was a school record and second in the nation. During his career he intercepted 22 passes, which tied the school all-time record. Roquemore was team captain his senior year and was named a first-team college All-American in both his junior and senior years.

== Professional football ==
Roquemore was selected by the Kansas City Chiefs in the sixth round of the 1982 NFL draft. He played two seasons for the Chiefs (1982 and 1983) as a defensive back and kickoff returner, competing in 24 games and starting 3 times. He had five interceptions that he returned for 134 yards and a touchdown.

In 1985, Roquemore played in 18 games for the USFL's Houston Gamblers, intercepting 7 passes, which he returned for 107 yards.

After spending 1986 out of football, Roquemore spent the 1987 season playing for the Arena Football League's Chicago Bruisers. He finished the 1987 AFL season recording 35 tackles and two interceptions.

In the fall of 1987, Roquemore played for the Buffalo Bills during the NFL player's strike. He played in 5 games, starting 2.

Roquemore returned to the Arena Football League's Bruisers in 1988. His 11 interceptions led the league by a wide margin and also set the AFL's single-season record for interceptions. In week one of that season, he intercepted three passes, which set the AFL single game league record.

In 1990, Roquemore played for the AFL's Albany Firebirds, recording 30 tackles and seven interceptions.

For 6 seasons, starting in 1991, Roquemore played for the Orlando Predators. During those 6 years, he recorded 290 tackles and 30 interceptions. He recorded 24 interceptions between 1992 and 1994, including a league-leading 8 interceptions in 1994.

At the time of his retirement, he had been selected to the All-Arena Football League first-team five times, made four Arena Bowl appearances and was the career league leader in interceptions, tackles, assists and passes defended.

== Coaching and business career ==
Roquemore was the defensive coordinator for the AFL's Albany Firebirds in 1997 and the defensive coordinator for the Houston Thunderbirds in 1998 and 1999. In 1999 and 2000, he was the head coach and director of football operations for the Richmond Speed.

In 1996, Roquemore was selected to the Arena Football League's Tenth Anniversary Team. In 1999, he was elected to the Arena Football League Hall of Fame. In 2002, he was inducted into the Texas A&I's Hall of Fame. He was then named the athletic director, head coach and dean of students at Cyber Charter High School in Sanford, Florida. After working in the Florida charter school, Roquemore became defensive coordinator at Fort Valley State University. He then moved to Atlanta, where, as of 2020, he was in business.

Roquemore was the head coach of the Georgia Force of the Arena Football League in 2024.
