= Chad DeGrenier =

American football player and coach (born 1973)

Profile
- Position: Quarterback

Personal information
- Born: January 13, 1973 (age 53); Phoenix, Arizona, U.S.
- Listed height: 6 ft 3 in (1.91 m)
- Listed weight: 212 lb (96 kg)

Career information
- College: Midwestern State

Career history

Playing
- Arizona Rattlers (1998–2002); Carolina Cobras (2003)

Coaching
- Cactus Shadows Falcons (2004–2010) (HC); Utah Valley Thunder (2009) (HC / GM); Mountain View Toros (2011–2015) (HC); Mesquite Wildcats (2016–2018) (HC); Mesa High School (Mesa, Arizona) (2019–present); Arizona Bandits (2025) (HC)

Career AFL statistics
- Comp. / Att.: 43 / 73
- Passing yards: 559
- TD–INT: 14–7
- QB rating: 83.08
- Stats at ArenaFan.com

Chad DeGrenier (born January 13, 1973) is an American football coach and former quarterback. He played three seasons in the Arena Football League (AFL) with the Arizona Rattlers and Carolina Cobras. He first enrolled at Grossmont College before transferring to Washington State University and lastly Midwestern State University. His father, Jack DeGrenier, played in the National Football League (NFL).

== College career ==
DeGrenier played his first two seasons of college football for the Grossmont Griffins of Grossmont College. He transferred to play football for the Washington State Cougars from 1993 to 1994. He then transferred to play for the Midwestern State Mustangs in 1995, throwing for 2,348 yards and fifteen touchdowns.

DeGrenier graduated from Washington State University in 1996 with a B.S. in Exercise Science.

== Professional career ==
DeGrenier was a member of the Arizona Rattlers of the AFL from 1998 to 2002. He signed with the AFL's Carolina Cobras on November 9, 2002. He was released by the Cobras on February 25, 2003.

== Coaching career ==
DeGrenier was head coach of the Cactus Shadows High School Falcons of Cave Creek, Arizona from 2004 to 2010. He coached the Falcons to a 15–0 record in 2006, going down in Arizona history as the first team to win 15 games and go undefeated while winning the state championship. He was the 2006 Arizona Republic Coach of the Year, 2006 Max Preps National Coach of the Year and the 2006 Arizona Cardinals Coach of the Year. DeGrenier was the Scottsdale Republic 2009 Coach of the Year and the 2010 Arizona Cardinals Coach of the Week.

DeGrenier was head coach and general manager of the Utah Valley Thunder of the American Indoor Football Association in 2009. The Thunder finished with an 11–3 regular season record.

He became head coach of the Mountain View High School Toros of Mesa, Arizona in 2011. The Toros finished with records of 4–6 in 2011, 7–4 in 2012, 6–5 in 2013, 3–7 in 2014 and 3–8 in 2015. He resigned in November 2015.

In January 2016, DeGrenier was named the head coach at Mesquite High School in Gilbert, Arizona.

On December 16, 2024, DeGrenier was announced as the Arizona Bandits' head coach for their inaugural season in Arena Football One. However, the team never played a game.
