= Jeff Fisher =

American football player and coach (born 1958)

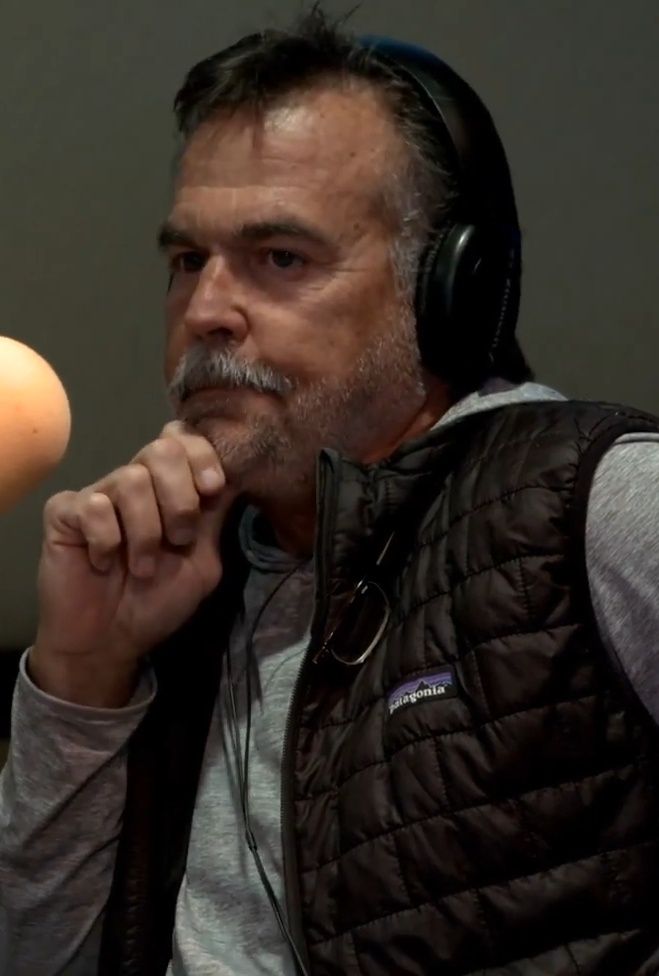
- Fisher in 2020

Nashville Kats
- Title: Principal owner & team president

Personal information
- Born: February 25, 1958 (age 68); Culver City, California, U.S.
- Listed height: 5 ft 10 in (1.78 m)
- Listed weight: 188 lb (85 kg)

Career information
- High school: William Howard Taft (Woodland Hills, California)
- College: USC
- NFL draft: 1981: 7th round, 177th overall pick

Career history

Playing
- Chicago Bears (1981–1985)

Coaching
- Philadelphia Eagles (1986–1988) Defensive backs coach; Philadelphia Eagles (1989–1990) Defensive coordinator; Los Angeles Rams (1991) Defensive coordinator; San Francisco 49ers (1992–1993) Defensive backs coach; Houston Oilers (1994) Defensive coordinator & Interim head coach; Houston / Tennessee Oilers / Titans (1995–2010) Head coach; St. Louis / Los Angeles Rams (2012–2016) Head coach; Tennessee State (2021) Advisor; Michigan Panthers (2022) Head coach

Operations
- Michigan Panthers (2022) General manager; Nashville Kats (2024–present) Principal owner & team president; Arena Football League (2024) Interim commissioner; Arena Football One (2024–present) Commissioner

Awards and highlights
- As player: Super Bowl champion (XX); National champion (1978); As coach: Greasy Neale Award (2008); Tennessee Titans Ring of Honor

Career NFL statistics
- Interceptions: 5
- Return yards: 1,329
- Touchdowns: 1
- Stats at Pro Football Reference

Head coaching record
- Regular season: NFL: 173–165–1 (.512); USFL: 2–8 (.200)
- Postseason: NFL: 5–6 (.455)
- Career: NFL: 178–171–1 (.510); USFL: 2–8 (.200)
- Coaching profile at Pro Football Reference

Jeffrey Michael Fisher (born February 25, 1958) is an American professional football coach, executive, and former cornerback and return specialist. He served as a head coach in the National Football League (NFL) for 22 seasons, primarily with the Houston / Tennessee Oilers / Titans franchise. Fisher coached the Oilers / Titans from 1994 to 2010 and the St. Louis / Los Angeles Rams from 2012 to 2016. He is currently the commissioner of Arena Football One, after serving as interim commissioner of the previous incarnation of the Arena Football League and also majority owner of the AF1's Nashville Kats.

After playing college football for the USC Trojans, Fisher was drafted in the seventh round of the 1981 NFL draft by the Chicago Bears, and played with the Bears for five seasons. He won a Super Bowl ring in 1985 while on injured reserve during his final season as a player.

Fisher then held several coaching positions for various teams before becoming the head coach of the Titans towards the end of the 1994 season during their tenure as the Houston Oilers and was the team's first coach when they relocated to Tennessee. Fisher continued to coach the Titans until after the end of the 2010 season when he and the team mutually agreed to part ways. Following a season away from football, Fisher was hired as the head coach of the Rams in 2012 and coached the team during their last four years in St. Louis. He remained the head coach of the Rams during the franchise's return to Los Angeles in 2016 but was fired near the end of the season.

Fisher's most successful season was in 1999, when he led the Titans to the franchise's first (and only) Super Bowl appearance in XXXIV, which ended in close defeat by the Rams for their first Super Bowl title. However, despite compiling a winning record as a head coach, Fisher's career has been noted for an overall lack of success, having only attained six winning seasons and postseason appearances in over two decades in the NFL. He is tied with Dan Reeves and Bill Belichick for the most regular-season losses in NFL history at 165, but has the third-most total losses at 171, behind Reeves at 174 and Belichick at 178.

== Early life ==
A native of Southern California, Fisher played Pop Warner football as a member of the Reseda Rams and was two-way starter on their championship team in 1972. He then starred as a high school All-American wide receiver at Taft High School in Woodland Hills.

== Playing career ==
Fisher went on to start for the USC Trojans, under coach John Robinson. During his collegiate career (1977–80), Fisher played alongside such defensive stars as Ronnie Lott, Dennis Smith, and Joey Browner. Fisher's USC teammates also included star center Bruce Matthews, whom he would later coach with the Oilers and Titans. Fisher and the Trojans won a national championship during the 1978 season, and in 1980, he was honored as a Pac-10 All-Academic selection.

Fisher was drafted 177th overall in the seventh round of the 1981 NFL draft by the Chicago Bears. He appeared in 49 games as a cornerback and return specialist in his five seasons with the Bears.

Fisher had a key performance in the Bears' 1981 Week 14 contest against the Minnesota Vikings. Entering the game, the 7–6 Vikings were fighting for the NFC Central title while the Bears were 3–10. In the fourth quarter, Fisher made a leaping interception at the line of scrimmage and then clinched Chicago's win by recovering a free kick after an intentional safety by the Bears, sealing a 10–9 win.

In 1983, Fisher suffered a broken leg on a punt return when he was tackled by then Philadelphia Eagles linebacker Bill Cowher. Coincidentally, the two would become rivals as head coaches beginning in the AFC Central in 1995; Fisher's Oilers/Titans squads had an 11–7 record against Cowher's Pittsburgh Steelers. In 1984, Fisher set a Bears franchise record with eight punt returns in a single game against the Detroit Lions, helping him tie Lew Barnes's club record of 57 returns in a single season. Fisher earned a Super Bowl ring after Chicago's 1985 Super Bowl season, despite spending the year on injured reserve with an ankle injury that prematurely ended his playing career. Fisher stayed with the Bears as a defensive assistant while on injured reserve for the season.

== Early coaching career ==
In 1985, Fisher used his time on the Bears' injured reserve to assist defensive coordinator Buddy Ryan. After the Bears won Super Bowl XX that season, Ryan was hired as head coach of the Philadelphia Eagles and Fisher joined him as a defensive backs coach. In 1988, Fisher was promoted to defensive coordinator at age 30, the youngest such coach in the NFL. The 1989 Eagles defense led the NFL in interceptions (30) and sacks (62). The 1990 squad led the league in rushing defense and finished second in sacks.

In 1991, Fisher was hired as defensive coordinator for the Los Angeles Rams, which reunited him with his college coach John Robinson. For the next two seasons, Fisher served as the defensive backs coach for the San Francisco 49ers. These years as an assistant to George Seifert placed Fisher in the Bill Walsh coaching tree. On February 9, 1994, Fisher again became a defensive coordinator, this time for the Houston Oilers under Jack Pardee. Fisher had succeeded Ryan, who left the post to become the head coach of the Arizona Cardinals.

== Head coach ==
=== Houston / Tennessee Oilers / Titans (1994–2010) ===
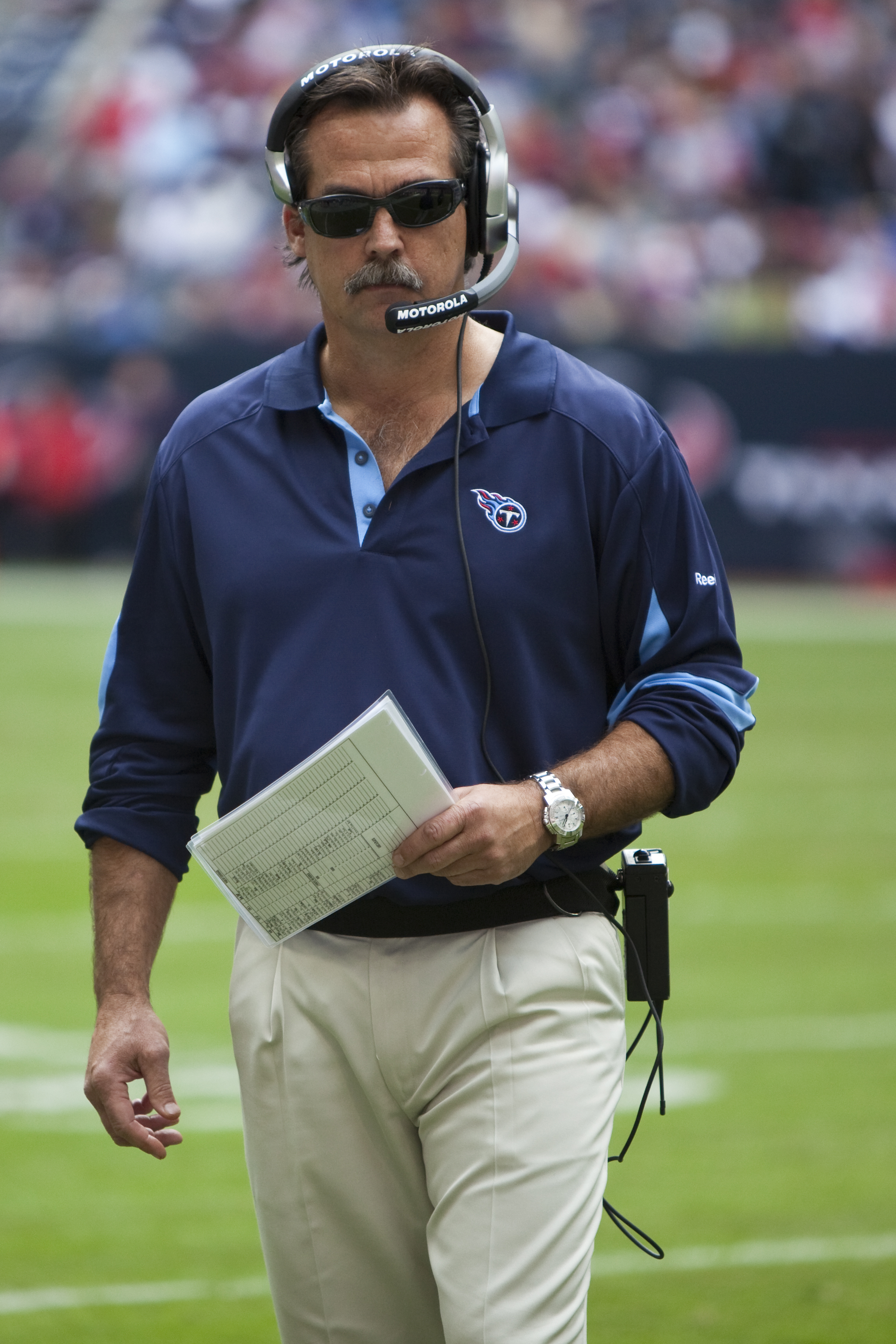
Fisher in 2010

On November 14, 1994, Pardee was fired, and Fisher was promoted to replace him for the last six games of the season. The Oilers retained Fisher as head coach, and the Oilers drafted quarterback Steve McNair in the 1995 NFL draft. The new coach did not disappoint, leading the team to a 7–9 record in 1995, tied for second place in the division. The following year, the Oilers added Heisman Trophy winner Eddie George, and they achieved an 8–8 record. However, an inability to get a new stadium deal in Houston caused owner Bud Adams to relocate the team to Tennessee for the 1997 season.

In the team's first two seasons in Tennessee, the Oilers compiled a record of 16–16. In 1998, the team's home games moved from Memphis to Nashville.

In the 1999 season, the newly renamed Tennessee Titans finished with a 13–3 regular season record, going all the way to Super Bowl XXXIV, in part due to the Music City Miracle. In the Super Bowl, the Titans lost to the St. Louis Rams by a score of 23–16; on the game's final play, wide receiver Kevin Dyson was tackled one yard short of the end zone with no time remaining, in what became known as "One Yard Short". The Titans achieved the same record the next year, but were defeated in the AFC playoffs by the Baltimore Ravens, who would go on to win Super Bowl XXXV.

The 2001 season was a disappointing one for the Titans, as they could only muster a 7–9 showing. The beginning of the next season proved to be even worse, with the franchise starting off with a 1–4 record. Following one home loss, owner Bud Adams made the comment to reporters that perhaps the Titans "were getting outcoached." This provided a spark the team needed, and they finished the 2002 season with an 11–5 record and made it to the AFC Championship Game.

The 2003 season saw more success, with yet another trip to the playoffs and McNair tying for the League MVP award (with Peyton Manning). Again, they lost to the eventual Super Bowl champions, the New England Patriots, but the team's progress did not go unnoticed. The 2004 season, however, was plagued by injuries from the start, and the Titans finished at 5–11. Following the season, many veteran players (such as Samari Rolle and Derrick Mason) were cut in an effort to comply with the strict salary cap. The relative youth of the team resulted in a disappointing 2005 season as well. Before the 2005 season, Fisher hired Norm Chow out of USC to be his offensive coordinator.

In 2006, the Titans finished a better-than-expected 8–8. Quarterback Steve McNair was traded to the Ravens and Vince Young was selected third overall in the 2006 NFL draft, but began the season as backup to Billy Volek and Kerry Collins. The season began slowly at 0–3, before Volek was replaced by Collins and, later, Young. The team ultimately started 2–7, but following a 27–26 loss to the Ravens and McNair, the Titans erupted to win six straight games under Young, including a 24-point rally to beat the New York Giants. With this promising record, the Titans exercised their right to extend his contract by a year, keeping him as the head coach through the 2007 NFL season.

In 2007, Fisher led the Titans to a 10–6 record and made the AFC playoffs as the #6-seed, but they lost in the opening round to the San Diego Chargers.

In 2008, Fisher led the Titans to a 10–0 undefeated streak only to be upset by Brett Favre and the New York Jets midway through the 2008 season. The Titans finished 13–3 and secured the #1 seed in the AFC, but lost in the Divisional Round to the Ravens.

In 2009, the Titans lost in overtime to the Pittsburgh Steelers in the season-opening game. The loss began a six-game slide that reached its nadir in a 59–0 slaughter by the Patriots. Collins, at the public recommendation of Adams, was benched and replaced by Young; the Titans responded by winning eight of their next 10 games, highlighted by a dramatic comeback victory over the Arizona Cardinals, a season-ending comeback against the Seattle Seahawks, and a hard-fought overtime win over the Miami Dolphins. Highlighting this season was the play of running back Chris Johnson; in his second year of professional football (he was selected 24th in the 2008 NFL draft), Johnson broke Marshall Faulk's NFL record for total yards from scrimmage with 2,509 and became the sixth back in NFL history to rush over 2,000 yards.

In 2010, relations between Fisher and Young became increasingly strained. In a home game against the Washington Redskins, Young was removed following an injury to his thumb and subsequently not allowed to re-enter the game. In disgust, Young began removing his equipment while still on the sidelines, eventually throwing his shoulder pads into the stands. Young walked off of the field as the contest continued and he never appeared in another game for the Titans, as he was released at the end of the season.

Initially, it appeared that Fisher's tenure with the Titans would survive this situation; however, on January 27, 2011, almost four weeks after the end of the 2010 regular season, it was formally announced that Fisher and the Titans had mutually agreed to part ways following a buyout of the one remaining season on Fisher's contract. At more than 16 full seasons, Fisher had been the longest-tenured NFL head coach with one team among active head coaches.

=== St. Louis / Los Angeles Rams (2012–2016) ===
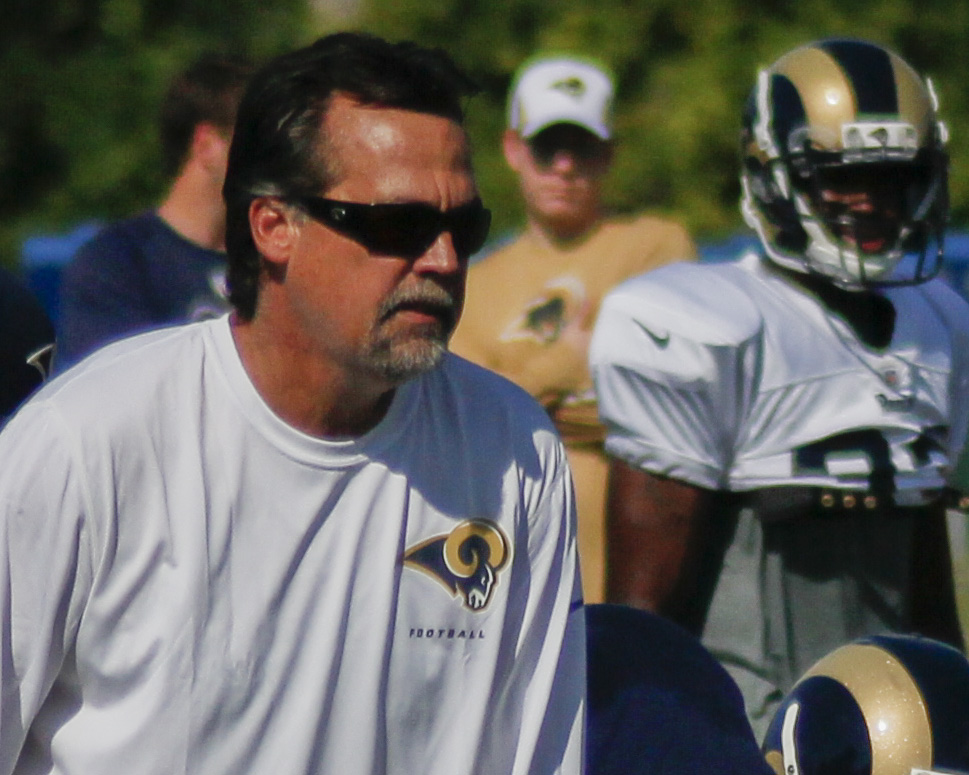
Fisher in 2013

After a season off in 2011, Fisher agreed to become the head coach of the St. Louis Rams on January 13, 2012.

In Fisher's first season in St. Louis, the team finished with a 7–8–1 record, a five-win improvement from the previous year. In 2013, the Rams finished with a 7–9 record.

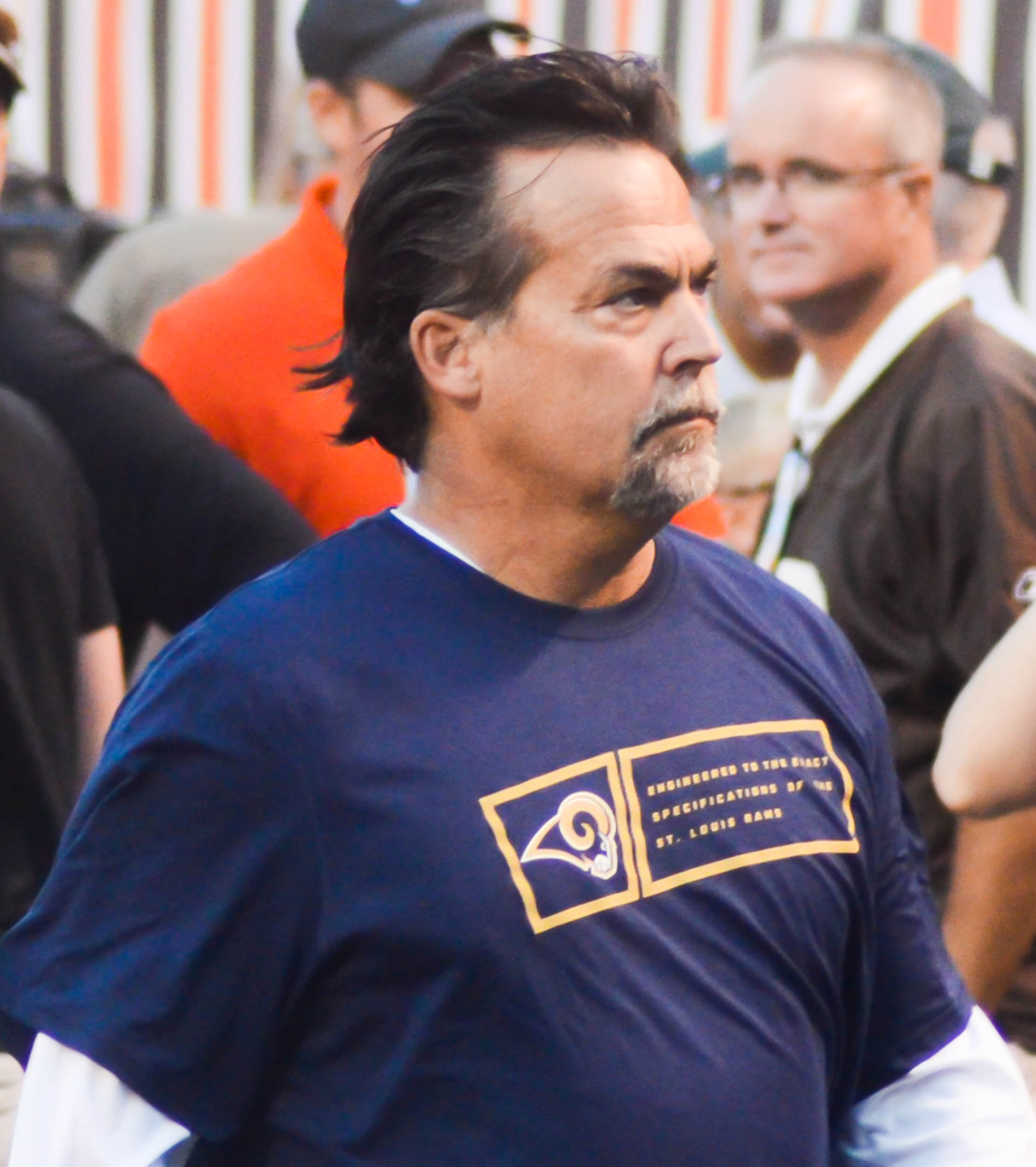
Fisher in 2014

During the 2014 season, the Rams went 6–10. It was the team's worst record under Fisher, and also Fisher's fourth consecutive losing season as a head coach. During the team's final season in St. Louis in 2015, they finished with a 7–9 record.

Prior to the 2016 season, Fisher gave a speech on Hard Knocks in which he said that he would not be "7–9 or 8–8 or 9–7, OK? Or 10–6 for that matter. This team's too talented. I'm not going to settle for that. I know what I'm doing." Fisher had previously been ridiculed for often finishing the season 7–9, finishing at that record four times over his 22-year career. The Rams started the 2016 season with a 3–1 record but lost six of their next seven games leading up to the Rams' announcement, on December 4, that they had signed Fisher to a two-year contract extension through 2018. However, just over a week later, on December 12, the Rams fired Fisher following a 42–14 loss to the eventual NFC champion Atlanta Falcons in which they were held scoreless until scoring two meaningless touchdowns in the fourth quarter. This loss helped Fisher tie the record with Dan Reeves for the most regular season losses of any NFL head coach of all time.

=== Michigan Panthers ===
On January 27, 2022, it was announced that Fisher would become the head coach and general manager of the Michigan Panthers of the United States Football League (USFL), becoming Fisher's first head coaching job in six years.

On February 3, 2023, Fisher resigned as head coach of the Panthers after one season, citing "personal reasons". He was replaced by former San Francisco 49ers head coach Mike Nolan. Fisher went 2–8 (.200) in his tenure as Panthers head coach.

=== Nashville Kats ===
On November 1, 2023, it was revealed Fisher would serve as the Chief Advisor for the Nashville Kats of the Arena Football League (AFL).

On May 14, 2024, Fisher assumed the position of interim commissioner of the AFL, following a series of controversies surrounding incumbent commissioner Lee Hutton.

=== Arena Football One ===
On September 6, 2024, Fisher was announced as Commissioner of Arena Football One (AF1), in addition to his roles with the Nashville Kats.

== Competition committee ==
Fisher was co-chair of the NFL competition committee along with Atlanta Falcons President Rich McKay until his resignation in August 2016.

== Head coaching record ==
=== NFL ===
Team	Year	Regular season					Postseason			
Team	Year	Won	Lost	Ties	Win %	Finish	Won	Lost	Win %	Result
HOU*	1994	1	5	0	.167	4th in AFC Central	–	–	–	–
HOU	1995	7	9	0	.438	3rd in AFC Central	–	–	–	–
HOU	1996	8	8	0	.500	4th in AFC Central	–	–	–	–
TNO	1997	8	8	0	.500	3rd in AFC Central	–	–	–	–
TNO	1998	8	8	0	.500	2nd in AFC Central	–	–	–	–
TEN	1999	13	3	0	.813	2nd in AFC Central	3	1	.750	Lost to St. Louis Rams in Super Bowl XXXIV
TEN	2000	13	3	0	.813	1st in AFC Central	0	1	.000	Lost to Baltimore Ravens in AFC Divisional Game
TEN	2001	7	9	0	.438	4th in AFC Central	–	–	–	–
TEN	2002	11	5	0	.688	1st in AFC South	1	1	.500	Lost to Oakland Raiders in AFC Championship Game
TEN	2003	12	4	0	.750	2nd in AFC South	1	1	.500	Lost to New England Patriots in AFC Divisional Game
TEN	2004	5	11	0	.313	3rd in AFC South	–	–	–	–
TEN	2005	4	12	0	.250	3rd in AFC South	–	–	–	–
TEN	2006	8	8	0	.500	2nd in AFC South	–	–	–	–
TEN	2007	10	6	0	.625	3rd in AFC South	0	1	.000	Lost to San Diego Chargers in AFC Wild Card Game
TEN	2008	13	3	0	.813	1st in AFC South	0	1	.000	Lost to Baltimore Ravens in AFC Divisional Game
TEN	2009	8	8	0	.500	3rd in AFC South	–	–	–	–
TEN	2010	6	10	0	.375	4th in AFC South	–	–	–	–
HOU / TEN total		142	120	0	.542		5	6	.455	
STL	2012	7	8	1	.469	3rd in NFC West	–	–	–	–
STL	2013	7	9	0	.438	4th in NFC West	–	–	–	–
STL	2014	6	10	0	.375	4th in NFC West	–	–	–	–
STL	2015	7	9	0	.438	3rd in NFC West	–	–	–	–
LA	2016	4	9	0	.308	Fired	–	–	–	–
STL / LAR total		31	45	1	.414		0	0	.000	
Total		173	165	1	.512		5	6	.455	

* – Interim head coach

=== USFL ===
Team	Year	Regular Season					Postseason			
Team	Year	Won	Lost	Ties	Win %	Finish	Won	Lost	Win %	Result
MICH	2022	2	8	0	.200	3rd in North Division	–	–	–	Did not qualify

== Personal life ==
Fisher has three children. One son, Brandon, played linebacker at the University of Montana and was a defensive backs coach for the Rams on his father's staff, before assuming the role of defensive coordinator at Tennessee State University. Another son, Trent, was a defensive back at Auburn University.

== See also ==
- List of National Football League head coaches with 50 wins
