= Georgia State Convocation Center =

Indoor arena in Atlanta, Georgia, United States

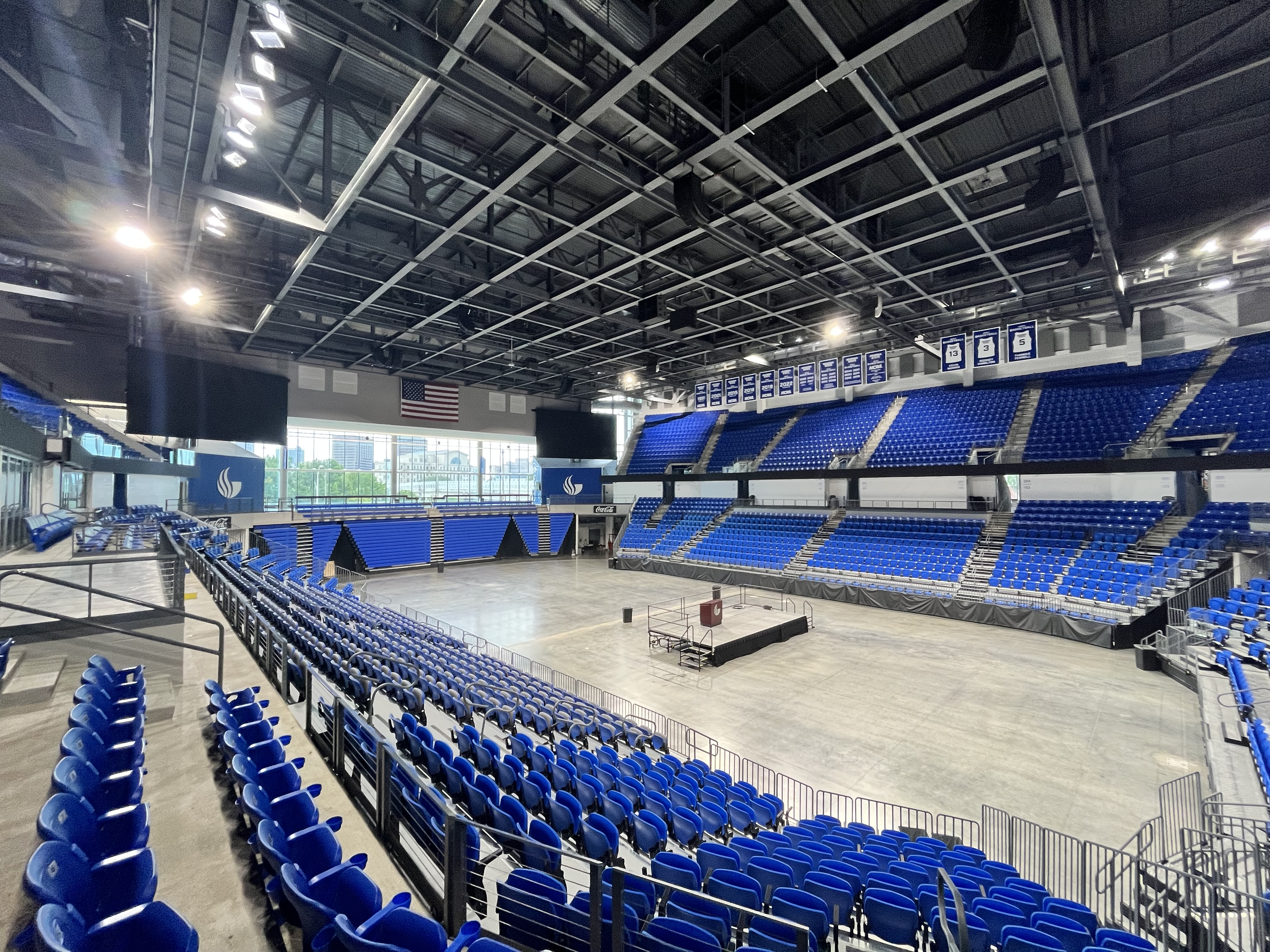
- The Arena as seen in August 2023
- Interactive map of Georgia State Convocation Center
- Address: 455 Capitol Ave SE, Atlanta, GA 30312; U.S.
- Location: Atlanta, GA
- Coordinates: 33.74270°N 84.38869°W
- Owner: Georgia State University
- Operator: Georgia State Panthers
- Capacity: 7,500 (Basketball)
- Type: Arena
- Record attendance: 4,803 (vs. Georgia Tech on November 12, 2022)
- Current use: Basketball

Construction
- Groundbreaking: November 2020
- Opened: September 15, 2022; 3 years ago
- Architect: SLAM Collaborative

Tenants
- Georgia State Panthers (NCAA) (2022–present); Georgia Force (AFL) (2024)

Website
- georgiastatesports/convocation-center

The Georgia State Convocation Center is a multi-purpose 8,000-seat indoor arena in Atlanta, Georgia. The arena is owned by Georgia State University and houses the Georgia State Panthers (NCAA Division I) men's and women's basketball teams.

== History ==
The $85 million arena was constructed at the intersection of Fulton Street and Capitol Avenue, in the Summerhill section of Atlanta near the Olympic Cauldron and in the parking lots of Center Parc Stadium, which is now owned by the university. The building seats 7,500 for basketball, but can be expanded to hold as much as 8,000. The new facility also includes classroom and academic support space as well as the ability to accommodate large conferences and esports tournaments. The arena supersedes the Georgia State Sports Arena, which was constructed in 1972 and has a maximum capacity of 3,854 seats.

The convocation center's ribbon cutting was held on September 15, 2022, while its first scheduled event, the investiture of the university's eighth president M. Brian Blake, was held the following day.

== See also ==
- List of NCAA Division I basketball arenas
