= Greg Reid =

American gridiron football player (born 1990)

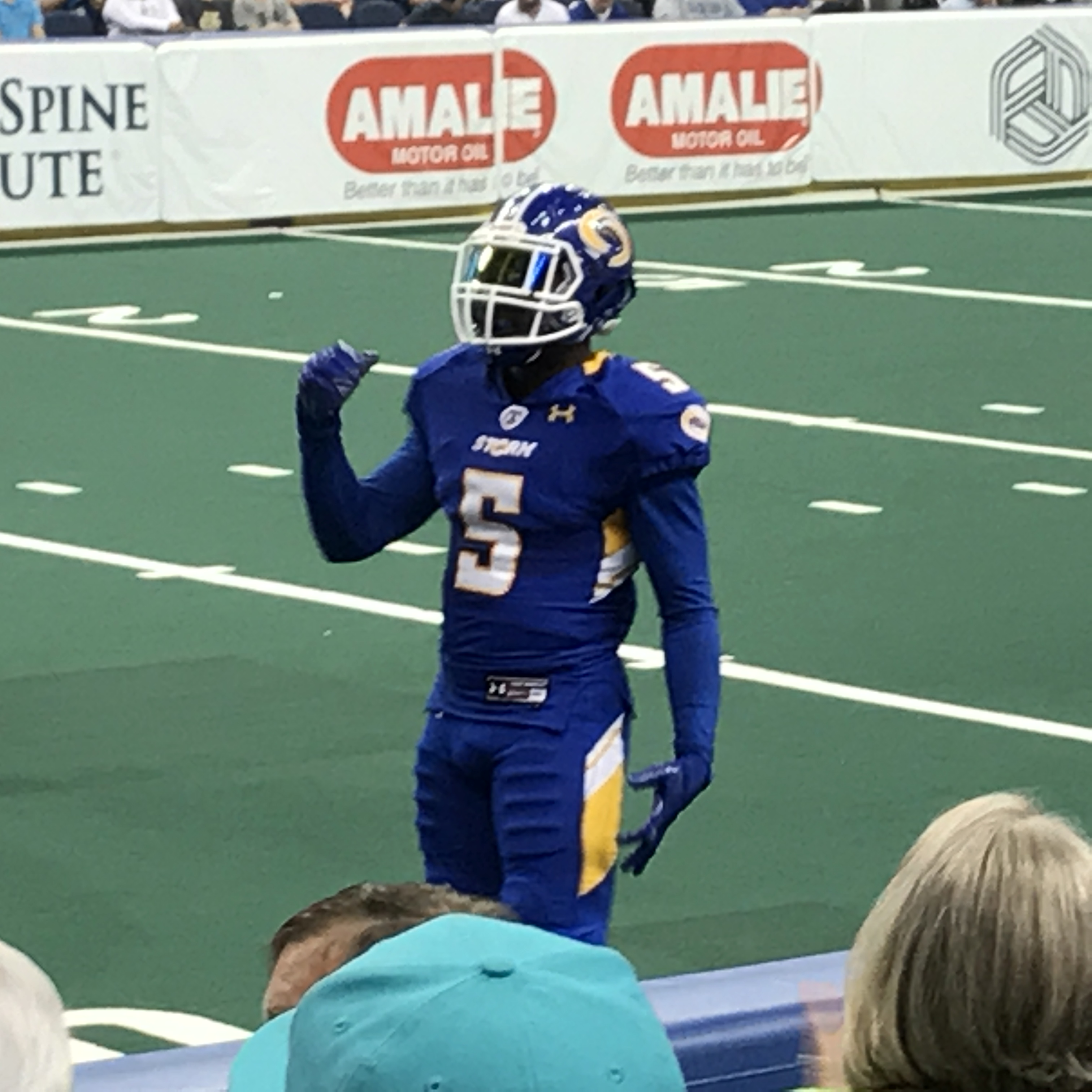
- Reid with the Tampa Bay Storm in 2017

No. 5
- Position: Cornerback / kick returner

Personal information
- Born: September 8, 1990 (age 36); Valdosta, Georgia, U.S.
- Listed height: 5 ft 9 in (1.75 m)
- Listed weight: 190 lb (86 kg)

Career information
- High school: Lowndes (Valdosta, Georgia)
- College: Florida State/Valdosta State
- NFL draft: 2013: undrafted

Career history
- St. Louis Rams (2014)*; New Orleans VooDoo (2015)*; Jacksonville Sharks (2015–2016); Tampa Bay Storm (2017); Monterrey Steel (2017); Washington Valor (2018); Montreal Alouettes (2018–2022)
- * Offseason or practice squad member only

Awards and highlights
- ArenaBowl champion (2018); AFL Rookie of the Year (2015); 2× First-team All-Arena (2015, 2016); CFL All-Star (2019); CFL East All-Star (2019); Third-team All-American (2009); 2009 NCAA punt return yardage leader

Career AFL statistics
- Total tackles: 178
- Forced fumbles: 2
- Fumble recoveries: 3
- Pass deflections: 50
- Interceptions: 16
- Stats at ArenaFan.com
- Stats at Pro Football Reference
- Stats at CFL.ca

Greg Reid (born September 8, 1990) is an American former professional football cornerback who played in the Canadian Football League (CFL) and Arena Football League (AFL). He led college football in yards per punt return in 2009, and was named defensive MVP of the 2010 Chick-fil-A Bowl.

== Early life ==
After a senior season in which he rushed for over 1,200 yards, scored 18 touchdowns and had nine interceptions, Reid was named the fourth best cornerback in the nation, and the top overall prospect in Georgia. He earned All-American honors from Parade and SuperPrep. The Atlanta Journal-Constitution named him "Georgia Player of the Year" and he was also the class five-A "Georgia Player of the Decade".

Reid was heavily recruited out of high school, earning five star ratings from both Rivals and Scouts, and received scholarship offers from Alabama, Auburn, Florida (he initially chose Florida over FSU during the recruiting process), and Georgia, among others.

== College career ==
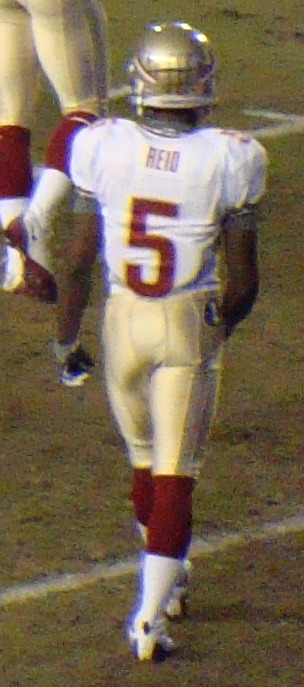
Reid with Florida State in 2009

Reid played all thirteen games of the 2009 season, intercepting two passes and leading the NCAA in punt return average".

On August 1, 2012, Reid was dismissed from the Florida State Seminoles team for violating team rules. He transferred to Valdosta State University which is in his hometown.

== Professional career ==
Reid signed with the St. Louis Rams on March 24, 2014. This was two days after the Rams held a private workout for him. He was waived during final cuts on August 30, 2014.

He was assigned to the New Orleans VooDoo on December 23, 2014.

Reid participated in the first inaugural NFL Veteran Combine on March 22, 2015.

On April 29, 2015, Reid was assigned to the Jacksonville Sharks. Reid's play led to him being named to the First-team All-Arena squad; he was also the AFL Rookie of the Year.

On May 30, 2017, Reid was assigned to the Tampa Bay Storm. He was placed on league suspension on June 8, 2017.

Reid signed with the Monterrey Steel for their postseason run.

On May 22, 2018, Reid was assigned to the Washington Valor.

His first full season with the Montreal Alouettes was 2019. Reid had 71 defensive tackles, knocked down 10 passes, made 3 interceptions, forced a fumble and recovered one. He was an integral member of the secondary on a resurgent Alouettes team and was named one of the 2019 CFL All-Stars. He signed a contract extension with the team on December 18, 2020. He became a free agent after the 2022 season.
