= Jack DeGrenier =

American football player (born 1951)

Profile
- Position: Running back

Personal information
- Born: February 25, 1951 (age 75)

Career information
- College: Northern Arizona University; University of Texas-Arlington

Career history
- New Orleans Saints (1974)
- Stats at Pro Football Reference

Jack Thomas DeGrenier (born February 25, 1951) was an American football running back for the New Orleans Saints of the National Football League. He was signed by the New Orleans Saints in 1973. He played college football at Northern Arizona and Texas-Arlington. DeGernier played one season for the New Orleans Saints in 1974. His son, Chad DeGrenier, played in the Arena Football League.
