= Arena Football League (2024) =

Professional American arena football league

- Sport: Arena football
- Founded: February 1, 2023; 3 years ago
- Founder: G6 Sports Group, LLC (Trademark holder) Chris Chetty (chairman); Anthony Rossi (president); Shan Singh (president of operations); Arena Football Management, LLC (licensee) (Lee A. Hutton III)
- First season: 2024
- Folded: 2024
- President: Anthony Rossi
- No. of teams: 8 (as of June 18, 2024)
- Country: United States
- Headquarters: Middletown, Delaware
- Last champion: Billings Outlaws (1st title)
- Broadcasters: CBS Sports Network, Gray Television, Vyre Sports, YouTube
- Related competitions: CIF, NAL
- Website: theafl.com

The Arena Football League (AFL) was a professional arena football league founded in 2023 with their first, and only, season beginning in 2024. The recent AFL took its identity, history, some of the rulebook and some team names from, but is not directly connected to, the previous iteration of the Arena Football League founded by Jim Foster in 1986.

On February 1, 2023, G6 Sports Group (a Delaware corporation operating as the American arm of Toronto, Ontario-based hedge fund ForceOne Capital), a new ownership group that had acquired the league's trademarks and social media accounts, announced the league's launch, as a revival of the previous Arena Football League that operated in two incarnations from 1987 to 2008 and 2010 to 2019.

The league launched in April 2024 with 16 teams, six of which were absorbed through a pre-launch merger with the existing Champions Indoor Football. Three weeks into the season, after numerous controversies, unfulfilled commitments and teams suspending operations, the ownership group fired founding commissioner Lee Hutton and reorganized as a ten-team league (shortly thereafter restored to eleven, by the end of the season shrinking to eight), hiring former NFL coach Jeff Fisher as its interim commissioner and bringing back general counsel Jerry Kurz from the previous incarnation of the league.

On September 6, 2024, all eight teams, along with Fisher and Kurz, announced their joint departure from the AFL to establish a new league, Arena Football One, separate from the legal entanglements that ensnared the AFL.

== History ==
=== Background ===
The original Arena Football League, created in 1981 and founded in 1986 by Jim Foster, had previously existed in two interrelated incarnations between 1987 and 2008, and 2010 to 2019. Three 2024 clubs revived the names of former AFL teams: the Albany Firebirds, the Orlando Predators, and the Nashville Kats; several other such revivals were included at the start of the season but were among those contracted in the reorganization. One franchise, the Albany Firebirds, had direct ties to the previous incarnation of the league; the Albany Empire, champions of the 2019 AFL season, transferred more or less intact to the National Arena League under the Albany Empire name. Though the NAL Empire imploded during the ownership of Antonio Brown in 2023, Mike Kwarta, the owner of the team in 2022, reacquired its assets and also acquired the 2024 AFL franchise. The Predators were also from the NAL, though in that case, there was no direct transfer of intellectual property, as the NAL version of the Predators had waited until the AFL version's trademarks had expired.

=== Pre-launch ===
On February 1, 2023, over a year after Darren Arbet, who had acquired the league's trademarks out of bankruptcy, sold them to an investment group called G6 Sports Investment Group and sub-partner F1 Sports & Entertainment, the new owners confirmed plans to relaunch the Arena Football League. The relaunched league, led by chairman Chris Chetty, president Anthony Rossi, president of operations Shan Singh, and commissioner Lee A. Hutton III, will feature 16 teams playing a 10-game season over the course of the summer months, followed by a postseason format that has yet to be determined. In a later interview, Chetty indicated that G6 planned no involvement or spending, with its only role being to collect licensing royalties from Hutton, who was given mostly free rein to build out the league: "everything down the line, turnkey. As an investor this sounds good to me. Hey, it doesn’t sound like I have to operate."

The league returned its logo to the one used from 2003 to 2018. The new iteration of the league announced plans to feature "streaming, betting, technology, (and) virtual reality" elements, per Rossi. In a February 2023 interview with ArenaFan.com, the commissioner mentioned that the league would have a salary cap of $700,000, but the league will allows additional salary spending for "franchise players". Players were promised a $1,000 per-game salary, substantially higher than that of other indoor leagues and in line with the AFL's previous incarnations.

On July 18, 2023, TMZ Sports initially reported, and the league soon confirmed, that the AFL had selected the following cities that would be receiving new teams: Austin, Texas; Boise, Idaho; Bakersfield, California; Chicago, Illinois; Denver, Colorado; St. Paul, Minnesota; Lake Charles, Louisiana; Cincinnati, Ohio; Orlando, Florida; Salem, Oregon; Philadelphia, Pennsylvania; St. Louis, Missouri; Tallahassee, Florida; Nashville, Tennessee; Everett, Washington and Odessa, Texas. Several of the cities' arenas indicated they had never been contacted or had only limited conversations before being awarded teams, with Cincinnati's arenas indicating they had in fact rejected the league's advances. Hutton purposely avoided confirming any news reports, stating that he would only release information "on our time," and threatened any news outlets who reported critically on the league with "egg on their faces come April 2024."

On August 29, 2023, the league officially announced that the Billings Outlaws, formerly of Champions Indoor Football, would be the inaugural members of the new version of the league. On August 31, the West Texas Desert Hawks (formerly the Warbirds) were the second team confirmed. The Orlando Predators were the third team announced on September 25; with the announcement of the Predators, the league announced its intent to instead have 20 teams in its 2024 season, as it planned on absorbing three additional teams from Champions Indoor Football. On October 5, 2023, Hutton appeared with the owners of three remaining CIF teams—the ICT Regulators of the Wichita metropolitan area, Salina Liberty and Southwest Kansas Storm in Dodge City—and CIF commissioner Mike McCoy as they announced the remainder of that league was merging into the AFL, with McCoy being named AFL deputy commissioner three weeks later.

On November 16, 2023, at the AFL relaunch event, Hutton revealed the 16 teams set play in the 2024 season, while he mentioned the league might expand in the future to 24 teams, as the Chicago Rush and Arizona Bandits are expected to join in 2025 along with other possible teams in markets that were part of the league's original market announcement. Hutton also declared that the league game "will be broadcast, streamed and will also be available in VR". He also referred to the original list of cities and revealed that other "leagues and individuals" (none specified) were trying to cancel teams contracts with the arenas and participated in "anti-competitive practices" to try disturb the league progress, which caused a move to different locations. Hutton also mentioned he was in preliminary talks about conducting international exhibition games, and with that in mind they changed the official website from "TheAFL.com" to "ArenaFootballUSA.com", as they plan to globalize the game.

=== Inaugural season ===
Following the inaugural week of competition in 2024, numerous problems began to emerge with the league's teams. The Philadelphia Soul coach and roster all departed abruptly before their contest (forcing an American Arena League team from Dallas to don the Soul's uniforms for the game) against the Louisiana VooDoo, who themselves were forced to move their home schedule from Lake Charles to Lafayette days before the game after the manager of Lake Charles's arena accused the VooDoo of failing to cover rent or insurance expenses. The Oregon Blackbears' home arena in Salem, Oregon was deemed unsafe, forcing a slew of schedule changes. The Iowa Rampage folded after its inaugural contest, accusing Hutton of reneging on promises to cover increased expenses, while the Rapid City Marshals granted six players their release and renegotiated lower salaries for their remaining players after they also did not receive the promised compensation from the league, a tactic the Washington Wolfpack also used. Their final game was on May 4, 2024, on the road at Southwest Kansas, losing 34–18. Rossi disowned any connection to league operations in the wake of the controversy, instead stating that his company had licensed the Arena Football League trademarks to Hutton's company for a fee that Hutton did not pay. Documents related to the Louisiana VooDoo showed that Hutton had indeed operated the league through the business structure of the Minnesota Myth. These problems have prompted calls for Hutton to resign, including from Billings Outlaws owner Steven Titus. Marshals owner Wes Johnson noted that the league structure centered all power in the commissioner, whom the owners had no leverage to fire. On May 9, 2024, it was announced that the Georgia Force had abruptly folded and the Soul had suspended operations for the remainder of the 2024 season with hopes of returning in 2025.

On May 12, 2024, kicker Melissa Strother made an extra point while playing for the Washington Wolfpack, making her the first female player to score a point in the Arena Football League. Strother, who had previously been on the Marshals roster prior to the CIF merger with the AFL, was a 13-year veteran of women's leagues and a former member of the women's national team.

==== Turmoil and change in leadership ====
On May 13, 2024, in an email from owner Diana Hutton, the Minnesota Myth became the fourth team to suspend operations, blaming it on an inability to raise necessary sponsorships because of "negative publicity" and accusing the owners of "sabotage" in order to force her husband Lee Hutton to resign as commissioner; Hutton confirmed the team's closure publicly a day later. Hours later, the same Arena Insider reported that sources with the AFL stated that, in a unanimous vote among the remaining owners, Lee Hutton was ousted as league commissioner and that Nashville Kats president (and former NFL and USFL head coach) Jeff Fisher was appointed interim commissioner. The official announcement was made May 14. This is despite a league bylaw that was believed to have granted Hutton total immunity from ouster by league owners; the ouster was made with the full cooperation of G6 Sports Group (owners of the trademarks and connected to the original F1 group that had founded the revival), who had suggested Fisher for the position. Chairman Chris Chetty, who had initially expected to remain in Canada and not to have an active role in league operations, noted that Hutton had breached multiple clauses of his contract with G6 even before the league kicked off, which provided the legal justification for revoking the license on the AFL trademarks.

The change in commissioner did not completely restore stability; Oregon pulled out of a last-minute assignment "due to unforeseen circumstances" on May 24, forcing the temporarily independent Cedar Rapids River Kings to step in the Blackbears' stead; Rapid City, having faced continued labor strife tied to the promises made by the Hutton regime, folded following their May 23 game. West Texas reportedly followed suit on June 18, with the River Kings again stepping in to fill in for the Desert Hawks' final game.

In more twists of fate in the ongoing turmoil surrounding former ownership in the "new" AFL, Arena Insider reported that former commissioner Lee Hutton and former president Travelle Gaines tried to apply for the trademark of the AFL shield logo which was rejected by the United States Patent and Trademark Office citing "likelihood of confusion". "Trademark Act Section 2(d) bars registration of an applied-for mark that is so similar to a registered mark that it is likely consumers would be confused, mistaken, or deceived as to the commercial source of the goods and/or services of the parties," stated in a letter from the USPTO rendering Hutton's and Gaines' claims to ownership of the AFL logo to be invalid. The trademark and all other trademarks from the AFL and af2 solely belong to G6 Sports Group.

==== Additions to front office and first season completion ====
The league would announce the hiring of its new president and chief operating officer Jared Widman on May 28, 2024, along with the announcement that the league was contracting to nine teams, again removing Oregon (who had been briefly removed from the league web site, then restored, the previous day) for the remainder of the season. Oregon announced a return to play in 2025 on social media and have also retained its previous online broker for ticket sales for "any future home games." Oregon was ultimately unable to return due to entanglements with former league president Travelle Gaines, who had owned the majority stake in the Blackbears and never sold it.

On June 4, 2024, the league officially announced the return of original AFL co-founding partner and former commissioner Jerry Kurz, this time as general counsel and senior advisor of player operations. On June 5, 2024, the league announced the addition of former AFL player Gary Compton as director of football operations. On June 8, 2024, the front office staff added Tracey Leinin as President of Football Administration. On June 24, 2024, they then added Laurie Voke as Vice President of Sales. On June 25, 2024, one day later they added former professional player and coach Dr. Jennifer Welter as Chief Marketing Officer.

The 2024 season finished July 19, 2024 with ArenaBowl XXXIII on a converted ice rink at the American Dream Meadowlands shopping center in East Rutherford, New Jersey, with the Outlaws defeating the Firebirds 46–41.

== Reorganization ==
On September 4, 2024, each of the eight surviving AFL teams from the end of the 2024 season released a one-sentence statement: "A new era begins today." Concurrently, the Arizona Bandits, a planned 2025 AFL expansion team, released their own statement: "Something big is coming." Later that day, hype videos featuring a revamped logo began to be released. Albany was the first team to confirm it had withdrawn from the AFL, but would not elaborate further, stating that further news would follow September 5.

According to sources, including ArenaFan and Arena Insider, the teams were to unite under a new banner, Arena Football One, a name that was originally slated for the second incarnation of the AFL in 2010. The new league, whose intellectual properties were initially owned by the Billings Outlaws, was a full separation from G6, as all eight teams left the AFL and join AF1. In a statement to Arena Insider, Chetty noted that after the league had narrowly completed the 2024 season, it had been left with numerous unpaid debts that he, though he would maintain responsibility, had been advised not to immediately pay off, but that the team owners had stipulated the debts be paid as a condition for returning. On September 6, all eight teams announced their departure from the AFL to form Arena Football One. Arizona officially joined AF1 in mid-November. Much of the Oregon Blackbears staff accepted positions with AF1's Oregon Lightning, a new team (formed from the existing Oregon High Desert Storm of the American West Football Conference, which had been inactive since 2023) that was established to be separate from the ownership entanglements that had ensnared the Blackbears. Attempts to reach G6 in late September 2024 regarding the AFL's 2025 plans went unanswered. AFL deputy commissioner Mike McCoy, who had joined with the AFL's merger with CIF prior to the 2024 season, departed for American Indoor Football.

In December 2024, Anthony Rossi, president of F1 Sports & Entertainment, indicated it had brought on Anthony LeBlanc as a business partner and would unveil plans for its "strategies for 2025 & 2026 season" to be unveiled in a documentary "on a massive streaming platform soon" that would "finally tell our (side of the) story." As of October 2026, no such documentary has been released on any streaming platform, nor did the league announce any plans nor play any games.

The Orlando Predators departed AF1 in March 2025, four days before its opening game, and expressed dissatisfaction with the AF1 business structure being controlled by the Outlaws and two other AF1 teams, in a war of words between Outlaws owner Steve Titus and Predators owner John Cheney, who is in the process of selling the Predators in hopes of returning in another league for 2026.

== ArenaBowl ==
The ArenaBowl Championship Game has been a staple of the AFL since its inception in 1987. Upon relaunch, this year's first game was planned to be played at a neutral site. ArenaBowl XXXIII was the first ArenaBowl hosted on a neutral site since ArenaBowl XXVI. Only a handful of ArenaBowls were held at neutral sites such as Las Vegas, New Orleans, and Orlando. This year's site was originally selected as the Target Center, home of the Minnesota Myth, but was dropped when the Myth folded and Myth co-owner Lee Hutton was expelled from his post as league commissioner.

On June 27, 2024, the league announced that the championship game, ArenaBowl XXXIII, was played on July 19, 2024, at the American Dream Meadowlands, a large shopping center and entertainment complex at the Meadowlands Sports Complex in East Rutherford, New Jersey. The Billings Outlaws and the Albany Firebirds faced off in the first ArenaBowl in five years with the Outlaws defeating the Firebirds 46–41.

== Teams ==
=== 2024 teams ===
| Team | Location | Arena | Capacity | Founded | Head coach | Fate |
|---|---|---|---|---|---|---|
| Albany Firebirds | Albany, New York | MVP Arena | 13,785 | 2023 | Damon Ware | Completed season, joined AF1 |
| Billings Outlaws | Billings, Montana | MetraPark First Interstate Arena | 8,700 | 2021 | Cedric Walker | Completed season, joined AF1 |
| Georgia Force | Atlanta, Georgia | Georgia State Convocation Center** | 8,000 | 2023 | Durwood Roquemore | Folded after two games |
| Iowa Rampage | Council Bluffs, Iowa | Mid-America Center** | 6,793 | 2023 | Tyus Jackson | Folded after one game |
| Louisiana VooDoo | Lafayette, Louisiana | Blackham Coliseum | 7,450 | 2023 | James Shiver | Folded after two games |
| Minnesota Myth | Minneapolis, Minnesota | Target Center | 17,500 | 2023 | Rickey Foggie | Folded after two games |
| Nashville Kats | Nashville, Tennessee | Nashville Municipal Auditorium | 8,000 | 2023 | Dean Cokinos | Completed season, joined AF1 |
| Oregon Blackbears | Salem, Oregon | Oregon State Fairgrounds Pavilion | 5,000 | 2023 | Chuck Jones | Expelled after four games, then folded; replaced by Oregon Lightning in AF1 |
| Orlando Predators | Orlando, Florida | Kia Center | 17,192 | 2019 | E. J. Burt | Completed season, joined AF1, then terminated by AF1 |
| Philadelphia Soul | Philadelphia, Pennsylvania | CURE Insurance Arena (3 games)** | 7,605 | 2003 | Patrick Pimmel | Folded after two games |
| Rapid City Marshals | Rapid City, South Dakota | Summit Arena at The Monument | 10,000 | 2021 | Shon King | Folded after five games |
| Salina Liberty | Salina, Kansas | Tony's Pizza Events Center | 7,583 | 2015 | Heron O'Neal | Completed season, joined AF1 |
| Southwest Kansas Storm | Dodge City, Kansas | United Wireless Arena | 5,300 | 2021 | Gary Thomas | Completed season, joined AF1 |
| Washington Wolfpack | Everett, Washington | Angel of the Winds Arena | 8,149 | 2023 | J.R. Wells | Completed season, joined AF1 |
| West Texas Desert Hawks | Odessa, Texas | Ector County Coliseum | 5,131 | 2019 | Chris Siegfried | Folded after eight games, joined the NAL and rebranded the Amarillo Warbirds. |
| Wichita Regulators | Park City, Kansas | Hartman Arena | 5,000 | 2023 | Clinton Solomon | Completed season, suspended operations after |

(**) Arenas that had been announced as each home team's arena but never hosted any games before their teams folded.

=== Map of teams ===
Surviving teams at the end of the 2024 AFL season:

=== Proposed/announced teams ===
- Arizona Bandits: Joined AF1 in 2025 after originally planning to play in the AFL in 2024.
- Chicago Rush: Had been included on draft schedules but postponed their launch to 2025. as of March 4, 2025 - the team is assumed to be cancelled as they didn't join the AF1 lineup.

== Media ==
For the 2024 return, the AFL had initially signed a national television deal with the NFL Network to broadcast over 30 AFL regular season games (games were to have been streamed on NFL+); but this never materialized, as NFL Network dropped plans to carry the games before they were played. The league announced on March 29 that much of the league's schedule will be carried on Gray Television owned-and-operated stations in each team's home market and in regional syndication.

Select AFL games were livestreamed through the Vyre streaming app before the league moved its remaining games to a league-managed YouTube account midway through the regular season.

The 2024 playoffs were carried via CBS Sports Network, with DAZN holding simulcast rights outside the United States.

== Partnerships ==
=== American 7s Football League (A7FL) ===
January 16, 2024, the league announced a partnership with American 7s Football League (A7FL) for player development, as players can transfer between leagues, with the A7FL functioning as its de facto minor league. As part of the partnership, both leagues "will collectively align on marketing efforts that will elevate the visibility of leagues athletes".

=== USA Football ===
In November 2023, the league announced a multi-year partnership with USA Football naming the AFL as an "official national team development & scouting partner", with the AFL helping USA Football recruiting players who want to represent the United States in international competition.
