= Nashville Kats (2024) =

Arena football team

Logo

General information
- Founded: 2024
- Headquartered: Clarksville, Tennessee at F&M Bank Arena
- Colors: Blue, yellow, black, white
- Mascot: Kool Kat
- NashvilleKats.com

Personnel
- Owners: Fisher Football Ventures, LLC. Jeff Jarrett (managing partner); Jeff Fisher (chairman); Greg Pogue; Bobby Devoursney; Jon Gruden; Michael Waltrip
- Head coach: Darren Arbet
- President: Jeff Fisher

Home fields
- Nashville Municipal Auditorium (2024–2025); F&M Bank Arena (Clarksville, TN) (secondary 2024–2025; primary 2025–)

League / conference affiliations
- Arena Football League (2024); Arena Football One (2025–present); East Division (2025–present)

Championships
- League championships: 1; 2026

The Nashville Kats are a professional arena football team based in the Nashville metropolitan area that competes in Arena Football One (AF1). The team plays at F&M Bank Arena in Clarksville, Tennessee, an exurb of Nashville. The Kats are a revival of a previous team of the same name that played in the Arena Football League. The new incarnation of the team began play in the new Arena Football League in 2024. In 2025, they became members of the newly formed AF1. In 2026, the Kats won their first Arena Crown Championship in a rematch from the 2025 Championship against the Albany Firebirds.

== History ==
Primary logo (2024-2025)

Secondary logo (2024–2025)

On November 1, 2023, the revival of the Arena Football League announced the return of the Nashville Kats and new ownership structure. The team was originally co-owned by Tamara Dadd Alan, founding partner and CEO; Nancy Eckert, founding partner, COO and general counsel; and Chuck McDowell, largest individual stakeholder and chairman of the franchise. Jeff Fisher, former Tennessee Titans Head Coach, was a partner and president of football operations for the organization (also now-commissioner of the league). Sports talk host Greg Pogue also serves as partner and vice president of community relations. Longtime broadcaster Eli Gold, former voice of the original AFL for TNN and NBC Sports and also known as the former voice of the Alabama Crimson Tide and NASCAR, was named the new radio voice of the Kats (moving back to TV in 2025). The team played at Nashville Municipal Auditorium in Nashville, with one game at F&M Bank Arena in Clarksville. They made it to the semi-finals for ArenaBowl XXXIII, only to lose to the eventual champion Billings Outlaws 35-32.

On September 4, 2024, the Kats, along with the other seven surviving members of the collapsed AFL, joined the newly formed Arena Football One. Jeff Fisher was named permanent commissioner of the new league while maintaining his position with the Kats. They compete in the East Division along with the Albany Firebirds and Orlando Predators. Shortly after switching leagues, head coach Dean Cokinos quietly left the team and was named head coach of the Berlin Thunder of the European League of Football. During the schedule revival, Jeff Fisher announced the search for a new head coach. On February 18, 2025, the Kats announced that former four-time ArenaBowl championship head coach Darren Arbet would become the team's newest head coach.

On October 18, 2024, Nashville Arena Sports, LLC, owners of the Kats, filed a lawsuit in Chancery Court for Davidson County, Tennessee, against chairman Chuck McDowell seeking an alleged delinquent payment which was loaned to the franchise. The suit alleged that McDowell failed to pay on a signed $2.5 million (USD) promissory note to the club. They were also seeking to have McDowell expelled from the franchise ownership group. Jeff Fisher announced that the team still planned to play in the league's inaugural season with its current owners despite this latest legal challenge. McDowell and the remaining owners reached a settlement with each other, culminating in a public reconciliation during the Kats' Week 4 game, in which McDowell led a ceremonial coin toss, and McDowell's amicable exit from the ownership group.

On May 4, 2025, it was announced that Jeff Fisher was officially named as the new majority owner of the Kats. He is joined by partners Pogue and Bobby Devoursney (who will serve as chief executive officer). The next day, the Kats announced the addition of Jon Gruden, former NFL coach and brother of Arena Football Hall of Famer Jay Gruden, to the ownership group leading football operations. Former professional auto racer Michael Waltrip was added to the ownership group on June 20. In March 2026, professional wrestler Jeff Jarrett was named managing partner of the franchise. That season, the team permanently moved to Clarksville, while retaining the Nashville Kats moniker.

The Kats proved to be one of AF1's most successful franchises off the field, as fans in Clarksville have consistently turned out to support the franchise. Fisher cited the Kats as a model franchise for the league. The Kats won their last 11 games of the 2026 season, including their playoff run that culminated in a victory in Arena Crown 2026, a game in which the Kats held off a comeback from the defending champion Albany Firebirds to win 59–53.

== Season-by-season ==
Championship victory	Championship appearance	Division champions	Playoff berth

Season	League	Conference	Division	Regular season				Postseason results
Season	League	Conference	Division	Finish	Wins	Losses	Ties	Postseason results
2024	AFL	N/A	East	6th	3	4	0	Won Quarterfinals (Orlando) 62-32; Lost Semifinals (Billings) 35-32
2025	AF1	N/A	East	2nd	6	4	0	Won Semifinals (SW Kansas Storm) 62-32; Lost Arena Crown (Albany Firebirds) 60-57
2026	AF1	N/A	East	1st	11	1	0	Won Semifinals (Michigan Arsenal) 92-76; Won Arena Crown (Albany Firebirds) 59-53
Total					18	9	0	(includes only regular season)
Total					4	2	0	(includes only the postseason)
Total					22	11	0	(includes both regular season and postseason)
