= Fabian Guerra =

American gridiron football player (born 1995)

No. 1 – San Antonio Gunslingers (IFL)
- Position: Wide receiver
- Roster status: Active

Personal information
- Born: May 18, 1995 (age 31); Miami, Florida, U.S.
- Listed height: 5 ft 11 in (1.80 m)
- Listed weight: 200 lb (91 kg)

Career information
- High school: Christopher Columbus (Miami)
- College: Fairmont State
- NFL draft: 2017: undrafted

Career history
- Carolina Cobras (2018); Memphis Express (2019); Columbus Destroyers (2019); Carolina Cobras (2019); Montreal Alouettes (2020–2021)*; BC Lions (2022); Massachusetts Pirates (2023); New Jersey Generals (2024)*; San Antonio Gunslingers (2024–present)
- * Offseason or practice squad member only

Awards and highlights
- National Arena League champion (2018); Arena Football League co-Rookie of the Year (2019); First Team All-MEC (2014); 2× Second Team All-MEC (2015, 2016)
- Stats at ArenaFan.com

Fabian Guerra (born May 18, 1995) is an American football wide receiver for the San Antonio Gunslingers of the Indoor Football League (IFL). He played college football at Fairmont State. Professionally, he was a member of the Carolina Cobras of the National Arena League (NAL) before joining the Memphis Express of the Alliance of American Football (AAF). He has also been a member of the Columbus Destroyers of the Arena Football League (AFL) and Montreal Alouettes of the Canadian Football League (CFL).

== Early life ==
The son of Fabian Guerra Sr. and Diana Benito, Guerra attended Christopher Columbus High School in Miami, where he played football and was on the track team. He was teammates with three-star recruit and future Florida State receiver Bobo Wilson, and thus did not receive many targets.

His grandparents were originally from Cuba and migrated to the Miami area, where his parents were born. Raised in a Spanish speaking household, he began playing football at a young age because his dad had played.

== College career ==
Upon graduating high school, Fairmont State University offered Guerra an opportunity to play college football for the Fighting Falcons; FSU was the only school to make an offer. In his freshman year in 2013, he appeared in ten games (starting seven), during which he recorded 32 catches for 315 yards and two touchdowns.

During his sophomore year, he had 63 receptions for 822 yards and five touchdowns; the receptions were the fourth-most in school history. In the season opener against Notre Dame College, he caught 13 passes for 247 yards and a touchdown, with the first two categories leading all receivers across the NCAA's divisions that week. During a 45–21 defeat to Concord, Guerra garnered media attention with a one-handed catch over two Concord defenders, a play that Fairmont State head coach Jason Woodman called "possibly the best he had ever seen"; the feat appeared on ESPN's SportsCenter program as one of the weekend's top ten plays. He was subsequently named first-team All-MEC, and was also a member of Beyond Sports Network's third-team All-Atlantic Region.

In 2015, he had 62 catches, 819 yards (eighth most in FSU history), and six scores, including four games in which he recorded at least 100 receiving yards. Guerra was named second-team All-MEC for his season.

Guerra's senior campaign saw the Fighting Falcons open the 2016 season 7–0, their best start since 1967, during which he set the school's all-time receptions record. Against Concord, he recorded three receiving touchdowns, his first game with multiple scores, in a Fairmont State 28–0 win; it was the Falcons' first win against the Mountain Lions since 2008. He was a member of the 2016 All-MEC Second Team.

He ended his college career with 233 total catches, 2,805 receiving yards, and 20 touchdowns. The receptions were a Fairmont State record, while the yards and touchdowns ranked second and third in school history, respectively.

== Professional career ==
=== Carolina Cobras ===
Unable to sign with a National Football League or Canadian Football League team, Guerra caught the attention of Billy Back, head coach of the National Arena League's Carolina Cobras, who noticed him on Twitter and remembered his catch against Concord. Guerra signed with the team in December 2017 ahead of the 2018 season. That year, he made 70 catches for 818 receiving yards and 16 touchdowns as the Cobras won the league championship.

In October 2018, Guerra re-signed with the Cobras.

=== Memphis Express / Columbus Destroyers ===
On December 12, 2018, he announced his intention to join the Memphis Express of the Alliance of American Football on December 12. He eventually made the Express' final roster for the 2019 AAF season, becoming one of two Memphis players who attended an NCAA Division II school along with fellow receiver Reece Horn. In his first game, Guerra had just one reception for 11 yards in a shutout loss to the Birmingham Iron. He was released on March 8, and signed with the Columbus Destroyers of the Arena Football League (AFL) on March 11. He was re-signed by the Express on March 26, and subsequently placed on the league suspension list by the Destroyers. After the AAF suspended football operations, Guerra was activated from the league suspension list by the Destroyers on April 6, 2019. He was placed on the league suspension list again on April 8.

=== Carolina Cobras (second stint) / Columbus Destroyers ===
Guerra signed a contract with the Carolina Cobras of the NAL on April 9, 2019. He was activated from the AFL league suspension list again on April 18, placed on the list again on April 25, and activated again on April 29. He was placed on the league suspension list again on July 18. Following the 2019 AFL season, Guerra was named co-Rookie of the Year on August 6, 2019. The AFL folded on November 27, 2019.

=== Montreal Alouettes ===
Guerra signed a two-year contract with the Montreal Alouettes of the Canadian Football League on December 4, 2019. After the CFL canceled the 2020 season due to the COVID-19 pandemic, Guerra chose to opt-out of his contract with the Alouettes on August 26, 2020. He re-signed with the Alouettes on December 18, 2020. He was released on April 23, 2021.

=== BC Lions ===
On September 15, 2022, Guerra signed with the BC Lions.

=== New Jersey Generals ===
Guerra signed with the New Jersey Generals of the USFL on August 22, 2023. The Generals folded when the XFL and USFL merged to create the United Football League (UFL).

=== San Antonio Gunslingers ===
On March 7, 2024, Guerra signed with the San Antonio Gunslingers.
