= Arena Football One =

Professional American arena football league

- Upcoming season or competition: 2026 Arena Football One season
- Sport: Arena football
- Founded: September 5, 2024; 2 years ago
- First season: 2025
- CEO: Jerry Kurz
- President: Christie McEwen
- Commissioner: Jeff Fisher
- No. of teams: 8 (as of June 2026)
- Country: United States
- Headquarters: Nashville, Tennessee
- Most recent champion: Nashville Kats (2026)
- Most titles: Albany Firebirds, Nashville Kats (1)
- Broadcasters: Vice TV, Hometeam Network
- Related competitions: AFL (2024), IFL, NAL, TAL
- Website: theaf1.com

Arena Football One (AF1) is a professional arena football league based in Nashville, Tennessee, that began play in 2025. The league was founded by the eight teams who had survived the 2024 Arena Football League season, only six of which would survive to the league's first game, later adding expansion teams and bringing in teams from other leagues.

== History ==
=== Inaugural season (2025) ===
Standalone logo first introduced on September 4, 2024

All eight of the inaugural teams in Arena Football One had played the 2024 season in the Arena Football League, which had been launched that year as a revival of two previous leagues bearing the Arena Football League name: the original that operated from 1987 to 2008, and the second—also known as Arena Football 1 before acquiring rights to the AFL name prior to its first season—from 2010 to 2019. The 2024 AFL's lone season began with 16 teams, six of which had joined through a pre-launch merger with Champions Indoor Football. Within three weeks, five of the 16 teams had folded. After multiple complaints of promises that were left unfulfilled to teams, to players, and to G6 Sports and Entertainment (the holding company that had been licensing the trademarks and intellectual property to the league), a hasty reorganization ousted founding commissioner Lee Hutton. With direct backing from G6, the remaining teams committed to finishing the 10-week season; three additional teams would fold over the course of the season, leaving eight by the end of the regular season. Jeff Fisher, who had originally joined the league as an advisor to the Nashville Kats, assumed the role of temporary commissioner for the remainder of the season.

Following ArenaBowl XXXIII, the surviving members of the AFL, including champions the Billings Outlaws, began hyping up "Arena Football is back" in various team social sites posing an image on September 4, 2024, saying, "A new era begins today." The next day it was announced that they would be playing in a newly-formed league called Arena Football One, sharing the name with a working title used by the 2010s AFL before its relaunch. The trademark was filed with the United States Patent and Trademark Office on September 1, 2024, by Outlaws owner Steven Titus dba Arena Football One, LLC, of Gillette, Wyoming. (G6 Sports Group still owns the AFL logo and its intellectual properties, but not the team IP's.)

The new league is a full separation from G6, as all eight teams left the AFL and joined AF1. In a statement to Arena Insider, G6 executive Chris Chetty noted that after the league had narrowly completed the 2024 season, it had been left with numerous unpaid debts that he, though he would maintain responsibility, had been advised not to immediately pay off, but that the team owners had stipulated the debts be paid as a condition for returning.

On September 6, 2024, AF1 formally announced its launch with a press release and new social media feeds, confirming that the new league would carry over Jeff Fisher as commissioner (now on a permanent basis) and Jerry Kurz, the founding commissioner of the 2010s AFL and a veteran of the original league, as chief executive officer along with the existing front office staff. In the statement, AF1 indicated that additional "expansion teams in emerging markets" would be among the teams to play the 2025 season. Of those teams, the Arizona Bandits, a team that had previously been announced to be joining the AFL in 2025, released its own teaser at the same time as the eight inaugural teams. In an interview with the Billings Gazette, Titus indicated that one of the expansion teams would be based in Mexico, and others would be in cities that had previously hosted arena football teams.

On September 9, 2024, AF1 announced the Stockton Crusaders as their first expansion team joining the eight former AFL teams for the 2025 season. On September 10, AF1 announced another expansion team whose name would later be announced as the Wilkes-Barre/Scranton Mavericks. and owned by Matt Rowland, a college friend of league president Jared Widman's. The Mavericks would ultimately never make it to play; in February 2025, the team ceased operations due to lack of sponsorship. an action that coincided with Widman's departure from AF1 the previous month. On September 12, the Monterrey Kings were announced as the first AF1 team in Mexico, led by former Monterrey Steel owner and NFL broadcaster Fernando Von Rossum Jr.. Firebirds owner Mike Kwarta indicated in an interview that the twelfth team, which was scheduled to be formally announced the last week of September, would be Arizona. The league had not ruled out further expansion before the season starts, with the schedule to be finalized by the end of October.

The season structure will feature two divisions (East and West) of six teams each, assuming no further expansion, all playing a 12-game regular season (up from 10 in 2024) and an eight-team playoff culminating in a then-unnamed championship to be held at the home arena of the highest-seeded team.

On October 22, the Oregon Lightning, partially owned by the head coach of the 2024 AFL's Oregon Blackbears Chuck Jones, were announced as AF1's newest expansion team. The expansion marks the continuation of arena football in Oregon under a new structure—legally, a continuation of the Oregon High Desert Storm of the American West Football Conference—following the Blackbears' entanglements with Hutton and its unsuccessful efforts to remain in the AFL in 2024. On November 13, the Corpus Christi Tritons were announced to be joining AF1; the Tritons had been part of American Indoor Football for the 2024 season but had been excluded when most of the AIF's teams joined the National Arena League.

On November 15, the Arizona Bandits, previously announced as a 2025 AFL expansion team, were officially announced as members of AF1. That same day, the AF1 announced it would be aligned into three divisions with a twelve-game schedule across a 14-week regular season, with the specific schedule and alignment to be announced on November 19. On November 18, the AF1 divisional alignment was announced, with the Monterrey Kings and Stockton Crusaders electing to postpone their inaugural seasons until 2026. Arizona, after failing to secure a lease agreement with Mullett Arena and cancelling a preseason scrimmage with the non-league Las Vegas Kings, withdrew March 8, 2025.

On December 16, 2024, the league announced their entire front office staff for 2025. On December 23, 2024, the league announced an official partnership with the National Scouting Combine (not to be confused with the NFL Scouting Combine). On December 27, 2024, the Regulators' owner Chris Zachary announced on the team's social media sites that the team was going dormant for the 2025 season, but would return in 2026.

On January 21, 2025, it was announced that the AF1 landed on a partnership with Verizon Business. The league signed an endorsement deal with professional wrestler Hulk Hogan to make Hogan's Real American Beer the official beer brand of the league. As part of the endorsement, Hogan promoted the league; Nashville quarterback Tyler Kulka earned the nickname "Kulkamania" in homage to Hogan, a nickname that carried over to Kulka's younger brother Joshua Kulka when he became starting quarterback for Albany.

On March 1, 2025, Arena Football One announced a partnership with AltFantasySports to deliver season-long and daily fantasy sports contests. On March 3, 2025, Arena Football One announced a Betting Partnership with BettorEdge for the 2025 season offering real-money contests and betting to increase engagement for Arena Football One Fans. On March 8, 2025, the AF1 announced on their social media platforms that the Arizona Bandits would once again go dormant in 2025 with hopes of making what would be their third attempt to launch at some point in the future. The same day, the AF1 regular season began with Southwest Kansas's victory over Nashville.

The 2025 AF1 season completed June 15, 2025 with Salina's buzzer-beating win over Southwest Kansas, with all eight remaining teams from the start of the season completing their schedules and reaching the end of the season without folding. Albany and Nashville each won their respective playoff games to advance to the league championship, Arena Crown 2025, which Albany won to complete a perfect season. Players were released shortly after the season to join Indoor Football League and The Arena League franchises whose seasons were still ongoing.

=== 2026 season ===
On June 27, 2025, Commissioner Jeff Fisher stated in an interview that AF1 planned on adding two expansion teams in Ohio and Michigan that will begin play in the 2026 season, but that which cities those teams would represent were still being finalized. On August 13, 2025, the Beaumont Renegades were welcomed as the newest members of the league two months after winning the National Arena League Championship and shortly departing that league afterward. On August 18, 2025, the league announced the addition of the Kentucky Barrels as an expansion team and that former Outlaws head coach Cedric Walker as their inaugural head coach.

Salina and Southwest Kansas both announced their departure from AF1 on September 19, with both joining the National Arena League. Logistics surrounding the two rural franchises led to the change in leagues, which was amicable on the part of both the teams and AF1. On September 24, the league welcomed the Duluth Harbor Monsters, back-to-back champions of The Arena League; the team rebranded as the Minnesota Monsters. Corpus Christi was tacitly expelled from the league in September, while the Outlaws, after threatening to leave Billings and dismissing its head coach in August, remained in limbo since then, with no word on the team's home in 2026 and no signing of a new head coach or players. The Outlaws formally suspended operations November 11. The previously mentioned Michigan team was unveiled as the Michigan Arsenal, based in Saginaw, on October 15.

On November 12, 2025, a day after the Outlaws withdrew from the 2026 season, the league formally announced the admission of the Oceanside Bombers, based in Oceanside, California. Also on November 12, it was revealed that the AF1 is currently facing trademark opposition from Nike, Formula 1, and Abercrombie & Fitch.

The 2026 schedule was released December 12, 2025. In lieu of divisions or conferences, the league will instead focus on specific regional rivalries that will have more games against each other.

Two substantial rule changes were announced for the 2026 season: the single will be reinstated as a score (encoded in the league rulebook as a "one"), and kickoffs that do not reach the rebound nets will be penalized.

The Oregon Lightning withdrew from the league midway through the 2026 season. The Kentucky Barrels faced a player strike shortly after this action, as the players demanded compensation for the elimination of the Barrels's last remaining home games (including their home game against the Lightning, and being disallowed from hosting a home playoff game even though they had clinched a qualifying seed to do so); the Barrels had already had fewer home games scheduled and longer road trips compared to other AF1 franchises. Barrels owner Corey Cunningham stated after the strike, which required the team to hire replacement players for two games, was resolved that the league was seeking to fix the issues by providing the requested compensation and, for the 2027 season, focusing its expansion on the midwestern United States to allow more of the league's road trips to be taken by bus; the league will also set the deadline for expansion team applications for earlier in the offseason to allow teams more time to secure home dates at their arenas. Following a change in ownership, the Oceanside Bombers changed their name to the Oceanside Stealth on July 13, the first step in a rebranding that eventually would be completed after the season ended. The 2026 season concluded on August 8 with Arena Crown 2026, in which the Nashville Kats held off a comeback from the Albany Firebirds to win 59–53, thereby marking Tennessee's first professional football championship.

=== 2027 season ===
The AF1 announced the ATX Bulls would be an expansion team joining the AF1 for 2027. On September 1, the team announced to play their home games in Belton, Texas. On September 4, 2026, the Minnesota Monsters announced their relocation from Duluth to the Minneapolis-Saint Paul area, eventually choosing the newly-constructed Lee & Penny Anderson Arena in Saint Paul as their home arena a month later. On September 22, the Oceanside Stealth moved to Pechanga Arena, becoming the San Diego Stealth.

The aforementioned Stockton Crusaders announced in June 2026 its intent to begin play in 2027 but AF1 has not yet formally acknowledged this.

== Teams ==
Team	Location	Metro Area	Arena	Capacity	Founded	Head coach
Albany Firebirds	Albany, New York		MVP Arena	13,785	2023	Damon Ware
ATX Bulls	Belton, Texas	Killeen–Temple/Austin	Huntington Bank Expo Center	6,559	2026	Kenny Vaccaro
Beaumont Renegades	Beaumont, Texas		Ford Arena	8,200	2025	Corey Mayfield
Kentucky Barrels	Highland Heights, Kentucky	Cincinnati	Truist Arena	7,000	2025	Cedric Walker
Michigan Arsenal	Saginaw, Michigan	Tri-Cities	Dow Event Center	5,500	2025	Tom Menas
Minnesota Monsters	Saint Paul, Minnesota	Twin Cities	Lee & Penny Anderson Arena	4,000	2025	Daron Clark
Nashville Kats	Clarksville, Tennessee	Clarksville/Nashville	F&M Bank Arena	5,000	2024	Darren Arbet
San Diego Stealth	San Diego, California		Pechanga Arena	12,000	2025	Clark Bartram
Washington Wolfpack	Everett, Washington	Seattle	Angel of the Winds Arena	8,149	2023	J. R. Wells

=== Map of teams ===
Locations of teams slated to play the 2026 AF1 season
Active Team Future Team

=== Inactive and former teams ===
- Billings Outlaws – played in 2025, suspended operations before 2026 season.
- Corpus Christi Tritons – played 2025 season, franchise revoked in September 2025.
- Salina Liberty – played 2025 season, then departed for the National Arena League.
- Southwest Kansas Storm – played 2025 season, then departed for the National Arena League.
- Oregon Lightning – played 2025 and most of the 2026 season, then withdrew.

=== Never played ===
- Arizona Bandits – announced as a 2025 expansion team, withdrew one week before its first game and never played.
- Monterrey Kings – announced as a 2025 expansion team, debut postponed to 2026. Social media is inactive since January 2025.
- Orlando Predators – played in Arena Football League (2024) and originally planned to play in the AF1's 2025 inaugural season before withdrawing in a dispute with the league and eventually ceded the Orlando market to the IFL's Orlando Pirates.
- Stockton Crusaders – announced as an expansion team for 2025, before being delayed to 2026 and then 2027. Though the team announced in June 2026 that it was ready to begin play in 2027, AF1 has not yet acknowledged them and has not formally invited them back into the league.
- Wichita Regulators – suspended operations in January 2025 after playing in the AFL in 2024, debut postponed to 2026. Web site is shut down and social media has been inactive since then.
- Wilkes-Barre/Scranton Mavericks – announced as a 2025 expansion team, folded one month before kickoff.

== Players ==
In an interview with the Albany Times-Union, league sources indicated that an expansion draft would be held to allot players to the four new AF1 teams, with the existing teams allowed to protect 15 players. The league will offer a base salary of $400 per game—less than the $1,000 that the AFL had initially promised in 2024 but higher than other indoor leagues, with teams allowed to pay higher salaries at their own discretion— and will not require players to play "ironman" on both offense and defense as they had under previous iterations of the league. The league will follow traditional arena football rules and restrictions otherwise. Players are also provided complimentary room and board at team expense.

== Broadcasting ==
On December 12, 2024, Vice TV, a cable broadcast network known for such programs as Dark Side of the Ring, announced that they were starting a new Vice Sports block on weekends and AF1 was included in the list sports programming. They will broadcast a Sunday primetime game, branded as Sunday Nights in the Arena. Veteran broadcaster Ari Wolfe and Arena Football Hall of Famer Sed Bonner are the play-by-play announcers and Sofia Guittierz serves as sideline reporter. (Wolfe and Bonner have since gone to the IFL.) Vice renewed its agreement with AF1 for 2026, with the network agreeing to a package of contests on late Saturday afternoon.

In April 2026, the Washington Wolfpack announced that it had reached an agreement with KZJO to carry all of its games for that season on that station.

The league announced on February 4, 2025, that all games not carried on traditional linear television would be carried online for free via EvergreenNOW, a new live platform being launched by Evergreen, which otherwise operates as a podcast distributor. AF1 discontinued its partnership with Evergreen following the 2025 season, hoping to develop a more "indigenous" league-controlled platform for 2026. (Evergreen shut EvergreenNOW down shortly afterward.) Shortly before the 2026 season, the league announced that HomeTeam Network would be the AF1's television production and streaming partner for the season, with HTN producing all of the league's telecasts (including those on Vice and KZJO) and carrying select games on the AF1 YouTube channel.

== Staff ==
Ref

- Jerry Kurz – CEO
- Jeff Fisher – Commissioner
- Christie McEwen – President of League & Team Operations
- Gary Compton – Director of Football Operations
