= Danny Southwick =

American football player (born 1981)

No. 2 – Utah Great 8's
- Position: Quarterback

Personal information
- Born: September 28, 1981 (age 45); Provo, Utah, U.S.
- Listed height: 6 ft 2 in (1.88 m)
- Listed weight: 215 lb (98 kg)

Career information
- High school: Timpview (Provo)
- College: Occidental
- NFL draft: 2008: undrafted

Career history
- Louisville Fire (2008); Oakland Raiders (2009)*; Dallas Vigilantes (2011)*; Tampa Bay Storm (2011); San Jose SaberCats (2012); San Antonio Talons (2013)*; Chicago Rush (2013); Cleveland Gladiators (2013); Portland Thunder (2014); Spokane Shock (2015); Los Angeles Kiss (2015); Portland Thunder/Steel (2016); Los Angeles Kiss (2016); Orlando Predators (2016); Cleveland Gladiators (2017); Massachusetts Pirates (2018); Jacksonville Sharks (2018)*; Philadelphia Soul (2018); Columbus Destroyers (2019); Philadelphia Soul (2019); Jersey Flight (2020–2021); Jacksonville Sharks (2021); FCF Zappers (2022); Columbus Lions (2022); Orlando Predators (2023); Billings Outlaws (2024–2025); Utah Great 8's (2026–present)
- * Offseason or practice squad member only

Awards and highlights
- ArenaBowl champion (2024)

Career AFL statistics
- Comp. / Att.: 525 / 883
- Passing yards: 6,294
- TD–INT: 113–40
- QB rating: 94.45
- Rushing TDs: 3
- Stats at ArenaFan.com

Daniel Aaron Southwick (born September 28, 1981) is an American professional football quarterback for the Utah Great 8's of the International Arena League (IAL). He played college football for BYU, Oregon State, Dixie State, Utah, and Occidental. He has been a member of the Louisville Fire of the af2; the Oakland Raiders of the National Football League (NFL); the Dallas Vigilantes, Tampa Bay Storm, San Jose SaberCats, San Antonio Talons, Chicago Rush, Cleveland Gladiators, Portland Thunder/Steel, Spokane Shock, Los Angeles Kiss, Orlando Predators, Philadelphia Soul, and Columbus Destroyers of the Arena Football League (AFL); the Massachusetts Pirates, Jacksonville Sharks, Jersey Flight, Columbus Lions, and Orlando Predators of the National Arena League (NAL); the FCF Zappers of Fan Controlled Football (FCF) and the Billings Outlaws of Arena Football One (AF1).

== Early life ==
Danny was born to Dan Southwick and Shawn (Southwick) King in Provo, Utah. He attended Timpview High School in Provo, where he lettered in football.

== College career ==
Southwick originally signed with Brigham Young University out of high school, when he elected to take a two-year Mormon mission. Upon returning from his mission, Southwick enrolled at Oregon State University. Southwick then transferred to Dixie State College for a season. From Dixie State, Southwick transferred to the University of Utah, where he walked-on and was listed as the backup quarterback going into fall camp with the Utes. Southwick then went back to Dixie State. He played his senior season of college football at Occidental. Southwick's college statistics, excluding post-season play, include 271 completions out of 478 passes (57%) for 3,804 yards, and 29 touchdowns with 23 interceptions. As a starter in college, during the regular season, Southwick compiled a record of 13 wins and 5 losses.

== Professional career ==
=== Louisville Fire ===
Southwick began his professional career in 2008 signing with the Louisville Fire of the af2 as a street free agent. After finishing the season with the Fire, the franchise folded as well as the Arena Football League.

=== Oakland Raiders ===
In 2009, Southwick signed with the Oakland Raiders of the National Football League, but was released prior to the preseason.

=== Dallas Vigilantes ===
On February 25, 2011, Southwick was assigned to the Dallas Vigilantes of the Arena Football League (AFL), but he was placed on reassignment just 3 days later on February 28.

=== Tampa Bay Storm ===
On May 16, 2011, Southwick signed with the AFL's Tampa Bay Storm. On July 16, Southwick made his first career arena football start for the Storm, where he was eventually replaced by Matt Grothe due to his ineffective play.

=== San Jose SaberCats ===
Southwick was assigned to the San Jose SaberCats of the AFL on February 16, 2012.

=== San Antonio Talons ===
Southwick was assigned to the AFL's San Antonio Talons on January 18, 2013. He was reassigned on March 21.

=== Chicago Rush ===
Southwick was assigned to the Chicago Rush of the AFL on April 11, 2013. He was reassigned by the Rush on May 16, 2013.

=== Cleveland Gladiators (first stint) ===
Southwick was assigned to the Cleveland Gladiators of the AFL on June 5, 2013.

=== Portland Thunder (first stint) ===
In April 2014, he was named the starting quarterback for the Portland Thunder of the AFL. He was assigned to the Thunder again on March 4, 2015. He was placed on recallable reassignment on March 20, 2015.

=== Spokane Shock ===
On April 7, 2015, Southwick was assigned to the Spokane Shock of the AFL.

=== Los Angeles Kiss (first stint) ===
On May 13, 2015, Southwick was traded to the Los Angeles Kiss for future considerations.

=== Portland Thunder/Steel (second stint) ===
He was assigned to the Thunder on February 1, 2016. The Thunder changed its name to the Portland Steel on February 24, 2016. He was placed on reassignment by the Steel on April 25, 2016.

=== Los Angeles Kiss (second stint) ===
On May 26, 2016, Southwick was assigned to the Kiss. On June 25, 2016, he was placed on reassignment.

=== Orlando Predators (first franchise) ===
On July 6, 2016, he was assigned to the AFL's Orlando Predators.

=== Cleveland Gladiators (second stint) ===
On May 23, 2017, Southwick was assigned to the Gladiators.

=== Massachusetts Pirates ===
On April 19, 2018, he signed with the Massachusetts Pirates of the National Arena League (NAL). He was released by the Pirates on April 25, 2018.

=== Jacksonville Sharks (first stint) ===
On April 26, 2018, he was claimed by the Jacksonville Sharks of the NAL. The same day, he was also placed on refuse to report.

=== Philadelphia Soul ===
On May 23, 2018, Southwick was assigned to the Philadelphia Soul of the AFL. On June 5, he was placed on reassignment.

=== Columbus Destroyers ===
On April 17, 2019, Southwick was assigned to the Columbus Destroyers of the AFL. He was placed on recallable reassignment on April 19, and activated from recallable reassignment on April 20. He was placed on league suspension on May 2 and was reassigned on May 23.

=== Philadelphia Soul (second stint) ===
Southwick was claimed off reassignment by the Soul on May 24, 2019. He was placed on reassignment on June 25.

=== Jersey Flight ===
On December 11, 2019, Southwick signed with the NAL's Jersey Flight. The 2020 National Arena League season was canceled due to the COVID-19 pandemic. On August 24, 2020, Southwick re-signed with the Flight for the 2021 season. On June 17, 2021, the Flight cut Southwick from their roster.

=== Jacksonville Sharks (second stint) ===
He signed with the Sharks four days later on June 21, 2021.

=== FCF Zappers ===
In March 2022, Southwick was drafted by the FCF Zappers of Fan Controlled Football (FCF) in the first draft of the FCF.

=== Columbus Lions ===
On May 13, 2022, Southwick signed with the Columbus Lions of the NAL.

=== Orlando Predators (second franchise) ===
Southwick played for the new Orlando Predators of the NAL in 2023.

=== Billings Outlaws ===
Southwick played for the Billings Outlaws of the new Arena Football League in 2024. He served as a backup quarterback as the Outlaws won ArenaBowl XXXIII. The Outlaws moved to Arena Football One in 2025. Southwick was released on May 9, 2025.

=== Utah Great 8's ===
Southwick played the 2026 season for the Utah Great 8's of the International Arena League.

=== AFL statistics ===
Legend
**Bold**	Career high

Year	Team	Passing							Rushing		
Year	Team	Cmp	Att	Pct	Yds	TD	Int	Rtg	Att	Yds	TD
2011	Tampa Bay	18	35	51.4	190	3	4	49.40	1	9	0
2012	San Jose	10	14	71.4	139	1	0	120.83	1	9	1
2013	Chicago	36	58	62.1	373	5	1	94.97	3	−4	0
2013	Cleveland	7	14	50.0	119	3	0	118.75	0	0	0
2014	Portland	166	265	62.6	2,086	39	**17**	97.15	15	**49**	**2**
2015	Spokane	**21**	**32**	65.6	**291**	**6**	3	95.18	**2**	0	0
2015	Los Angeles	**191**	**338**	56.5	**2,341**	**43**	10	97.51	**24**	10	0
2016	Portland	74	125	59.2	742	13	5	85.48	1	15	0
2016	Los Angeles	1	1	**100.0**	9	0	0	104.17	0	0	0
2017	Cleveland	1	1	**100.0**	4	0	0	83.33	0	0	0
2019	Philadelphia	3	4	75.0	30	1	0	**135.42**	0	0	0
2019	Columbus	10	17	58.8	123	1	2	56.37	2	5	0
Career		538	904	59.5	6,447	115	42	93.84	49	93	3

== Personal life ==
Southwick is the son of actress Shawn Southwick, and was the stepson of talk show host Larry King. Southwick has also spent time as a visiting assistant professor at BYU.
