= 2025 Arena Football One season =

- League: Arena Football One
- Sport: Arena football
- Duration: March 7 – June 15 (Regular season); June 20 – June 28 (Playoffs)
- Teams: 8
- TV partner(s): Vice TV, EvergreenNOW
- Season MVP: Sam Castronova

Quest for the Arena Crown
- Semifinal champions: Albany Firebirds
- Semifinal runners-up: Salina Liberty
- Semifinal champions: Nashville Kats
- Semifinal runners-up: Southwest Kansas Storm

Arena Crown 2025
- Champions: Albany Firebirds
- Runners-up: Nashville Kats
- Finals MVP: Sam Castronova

Arena Football One seasons
- 2026

East Division, Central Division, West Division

The 2025 Arena Football One season was the inaugural season of the new Arena Football One (AF1). The regular season began on March 7, 2025, and ran through June 15, 2025, with the playoffs running through Arena Crown 2025 on June 28, when the Albany Firebirds (who had lost the Arenabowl to the Billings Outlaws in 2024) won the Arena Crown and completed a perfect season, marking the first championship in franchise history and the fifth time an arena football championship was won by a team based in Albany, New York.

== Background ==
Six of the eight teams that reached the opening weekend of the AF1 season had played the 2024 season in the Arena Football League, which had been launched that year as a revival of two leagues bearing the Arena Football League name: the original that operated from 1987 to 2008, and the second—coincidentally also known as Arena Football 1 before acquiring rights to the AFL name prior to its first season—from 2010 to 2019. A seventh, the Oregon Lightning, has indirect connections (including the head coach and front office staff) to the AFL's Oregon Blackbears, who had made an unsuccessful effort to sever themselves from the AFL's prior management group during the 2024 season. The 2024 AFL's lone season began with 16 teams, six of which had joined through a pre-launch merger with Champions Indoor Football. Within three weeks, five of the 16 teams had folded. After multiple complaints of promises that were left unfulfilled to teams, to players, and to G6 Sports and Entertainment (the holding company that had been licensing the trademarks and intellectual property to the league), a hasty reorganization ousted founding commissioner Lee Hutton. With direct backing from G6, the remaining teams committed to finishing the 10-week season; three additional teams would fold over the course of the season, leaving eight by the end of the regular season. Jeff Fisher, who had originally joined the league as an advisor to the Nashville Kats, assumed the role of temporary commissioner for the remainder of the season.

Following ArenaBowl XXXIII, the eight teams that had finished the 2024 AFL season, including champions the Billings Outlaws, began hyping up "Arena Football is back" in various team social sites posing an image on September 4, 2024, saying, "A new era begins today." The next day it was announced that they would be playing in a newly-formed league called Arena Football One, sharing the name with a working title used by the 2010s AFL before its launch, with all eight teams initially being included in the AF1 lineup. The trademark was filed with the United States Patent and Trademark Office on September 1, 2024, by Outlaws owner Steven Titus dba Arena Football One, LLC, of Gillette, Wyoming. (G6 Sports Group still owns the AFL logo and its intellectual properties, but not the team IP's.)

The new league is a full separation from G6, as all of the teams left the AFL and joined AF1. In a statement to Arena Insider, G6 executive Chris Chetty noted that after the league had narrowly completed the 2024 season, it had been left with numerous unpaid debts that he, though he would maintain responsibility, had been advised not to immediately pay off, but that the team owners had stipulated the debts be paid as a condition for returning.

On September 6, 2024, AF1 formally announced its launch with a press release and new social media feeds, confirming that the new league would carry over Jeff Fisher as commissioner (now on a permanent basis) and Jerry Kurz, the founding commissioner of the 2010s AFL and a veteran of the original league, as chief executive officer along with the existing front office staff. In the statement, AF1 indicated that additional "expansion teams in emerging markets" would be among the teams to play the 2025 season. In an interview with the Billings Gazette, Titus indicated that one of the expansion teams would be based in Mexico, and others would be in cities that had previously hosted arena football teams.

On September 9, 2024, AF1 announced the Stockton Crusaders as their first expansion team joining the eight former AFL teams for the 2025 season. On September 10, AF1 announced another expansion team to be based out of Wilkes-Barre, Pennsylvania and owned by Matt Rowland, a college friend of league president Jared Widman's. On September 12, the Monterrey Kings were announced as the first AF1 team in Mexico. Firebirds owner Mike Kwarta indicated in an interview that the twelfth team, which was scheduled to be formally announced the last week of September, would be the Arizona Bandits, a team that had been slated to join the AFL but had postponed its launch to 2025 and had released its own teaser at the same time as the eight inaugural teams. The league did not rule out further expansion before the season starts, with the schedule to be finalized by the end of October.

In an interview with the Albany Times-Union, league sources indicated that an expansion draft would be held to allot players to the four new AF1 teams, with the existing teams allowed to protect 15 players. The league will offer a base salary of $400 per game—less than the $1,000 that the AFL had initially promised in 2024 but higher than other indoor leagues, with teams allowed to pay higher salaries at their own discretion— and will not require players to play "ironman" on both offense and defense as they had under previous iterations of the league. The league will follow traditional arena football rules and restrictions otherwise. The season structure will feature two divisions (East and West) of six teams each, assuming no further expansion, all playing a 12-game regular season (up from 10 in 2024) and an eight-team playoff culminating in a yet-unnamed championship to be held at the home arena of the highest-seeded team.

On October 22, the Oregon Lightning, partially owned by the head coach of the 2024 AFL's Oregon Blackbears Chuck Jones, were announced as AF1's newest expansion team. The expansion marks the continuation of arena football in Oregon under a new structure—legally, a continuation of the Oregon High Desert Storm of the American West Football Conference—following the Blackbears' entanglements with Hutton and its unsuccessful efforts to remain in the AFL in 2024. On November 13, the Corpus Christi Tritons were announced to be joining AF1; the Tritons had been part of American Indoor Football for the 2024 season but had been excluded when most of the AIF's teams joined the National Arena League.

On November 15, the Arizona Bandits were officially announced as members of AF1. That same day, the AF1 announced it would be aligned into three divisions with a twelve-game schedule across a 14-week regular season, with the specific schedule and alignment to be announced on November 19. On November 18, the AF1 divisional alignment was announced, with the Monterrey Kings and Stockton Crusaders electing to defer their inaugural seasons until 2026. On December 27, 2024, Wichita Regulators' owner Chris Zachary announced on the team's social media sites that the team was going dormant for the 2025 season, but would return in 2026.

Teams will play 12 games over 15 weeks, featuring both divisional and cross-division games. There will be three weeks of playoffs: the Wild Card, the semifinals, and then a week off before the league championship on July 12. With Widman's resignation from AF1 in late January, the Wilkes-Barre team folded on February 14 without playing a down, citing sponsorship shortfalls. Arizona and the Orlando Predators would withdraw days before the league's first game, with Orlando's departure being particularly contentious and triggering legal action and public sparring between the league and the Predators ownership.

The AF1 season began on schedule March 8, 2025 with the Southwest Kansas Storm's 40–26 victory over the Nashville Kats.

During week 7 of the season, much of the Corpus Christi Tritons roster refused to play, for reasons never officially stated but rumored to be related to team finances. A makeshift replacement roster hosted the Albany Firebirds for the April 25 game, in which the Firebirds ran up the score (despite resting their starting quarterback themselves and relying on experimental tricks such as drop kicking extra points) on the substitute Tritons en route to a 100–12 rout. The league issued a statement noting that it was aware of the rumors "and more that is not public at this time" as an investigation was ongoing. Ten of the Tritons players were released or suspended, with the Billings Outlaws signing four of them two days later. No objection was formally raised to the potential self-dealing and lack of a waiver wire; Albany's head coach stated that they had already completed their schedule against Billings for 2025 and thus the point would be moot.

League chairman Steve Titus acknowledged financial difficulties in a personal social media post he made May 4; he noted that low attendance, a loss of sponsorship, lack of government support, increased expenses and greater competition for talent had contributed to the Billings Outlaws' sudden slide in the standings (at the time, the team was on a four-game losing streak) and was prompting Titus to explore relocating the franchise, to that effect dropping the name "Billings" from its name following Week 11 while committing to play out the rest of its home games in Billings.

The regular season ended June 15, 2025, a game in which the Salina Liberty would clinch the final playoff seed on an end-of-game, go-ahead field goal; the win capped off a late-season comeback for the Liberty, who started the season 0–4 but would go 6–1 the remainder of the season (the only loss coming to undefeated Albany) to clinch the playoff seed. With the completion of the season, all eight teams that reached the beginning of the 2025 season reached the end of the season without folding.

== Teams ==
Division	Team	Location	Arena	Capacity	Founded	Head coach
East	Albany Firebirds	Albany, New York	MVP Arena	13,785	2023	Damon Ware
East	Nashville Kats	Nashville, Tennessee	Nashville Municipal Auditorium	8,000	1997	Darren Arbet
Central	Corpus Christi Tritons	Corpus Christi, Texas	American Bank Center	10,000	2023	Johnny Anderson
Central	Salina Liberty	Salina, Kansas	Tony's Pizza Events Center	7,583	2015	Heron O'Neal
Central	Southwest Kansas Storm	Dodge City, Kansas	United Wireless Arena	5,300	2021	Gary Thomas
West	Outlaws Arena Football Team	Billings, Montana	First Interstate Arena	8,700	2021	Cedric Walker
West	Oregon Lightning	Redmond, Oregon	First Interstate Bank Center	4,000	2021	Chuck Jones
West	Washington Wolfpack	Everett, Washington	Angel of the Winds Arena	8,149	2023	J.R. Wells

== Coaching changes ==
Team	Departing coach	Incoming coach	Notes
Corpus Christi Tritons	Bradly Chavez	Johnny Anderson	
Nashville Kats	Dean Cokinos	Darren Arbet	Cokinos resigned December 5, 2024, initially intending to coach in the European League of Football. He finished his tenure with the Kats with a record of 4–5 including playoff games. Arbet had originally been named coach of the Arizona Bandits in 2024 but had been replaced by Chad DeGrenier before the 2025 season, had that team made it to play.

== Final standings ==
2025 Arena Football One standings
	W	L	PCT	GB	PF	PA	DIFF	STK
(x) Albany Firebirds	10	0	1.000	–	675	276	399	W10
(x) Nashville Kats	6	4	.600	4	472	386	86	W1
(x) Southwest Kansas Storm	7	5	.583	4	561	491	70	L2
(x) Salina Liberty	6	5	.545	4.5	493	463	30	W4
(e) Outlaws Football	6	6	.500	5	553	466	87	W3
(e) Oregon Lightning	5	8	.385	6.5	461	502	-41	L1
(e) Corpus Christi Tritons	3	7	.300	7	332	497	-165	L7
(e) Washington Wolfpack	2	10	.167	9	235	701	-466	L6
(x)–clinched playoff berth; (e)–eliminated from playoff contention

== Season schedule ==
=== Regular season ===
==== Week 0 ====
Date and time	Away team	Result	Home team	Arena	Attendance	Broadcast	Notes
SAT, March 8, 7:00 p.m. ET	Nashville Kats	26–40	Southwest Kansas Storm	United Wireless Arena	1,369	EvergreenNow	

==== Week 1 ====
Date and time	Away team	Result	Home team	Arena	Attendance	Broadcast	Notes
SAT, March 15, 9:30 p.m. ET	Billings Outlaws	78–36	Oregon Lightning	First Interstate Bank Center		EvergreenNow	
SUN, March 16, 6:00 p.m. ET	Salina Liberty	12–40	Corpus Christi Tritons	American Bank Center		EvergreenNow	
SUN, March 16, 7:00 p.m. ET	Southwest Kansas Storm	63–33	Washington Wolfpack	Angel of the Winds Arena		Vice TV	

==== Week 2 ====
Date and time	Away team	Result	Home team	Arena	Attendance	Broadcast	Notes
FRI, March 21, 7:00 p.m. ET	Southwest Kansas Storm	20–78	Albany Firebirds	MVP Arena	2,952	Vice TV	
SAT, March 22, 9:00 p.m. ET	Oregon Lightning	28–35	Washington Wolfpack	Angel of the Winds Arena		EvergreenNow	

==== Week 3 ====
Date and time	Away	Result	Home	Arena	Attendance	Broadcast	Notes
FRI, March 28, 8:00 p.m. ET	Salina Liberty	37–51	Corpus Christi Tritons	American Bank Center		EvergreenNow	
SAT, March 29, 8:00 p.m. ET	Albany Firebirds	42–34	Nashville Kats	Nashville Municipal Auditorium		EvergreenNow	
SUN, March 30, 6:00 p.m. ET	Oregon Lightning	41–40	Southwest Kansas Storm	United Wireless Arena		Vice TV	

==== Week 4 ====
Date and time	Away team	Result	Home team	Arena	Attendance	Broadcast	Notes
THU, April 3, 10:00 p.m. ET	Billings Outlaws	61–23	Washington Wolfpack	Angel of the Winds Arena		EvergreenNow	
FRI, April 4, 7:30 p.m. ET	Oregon Lightning	32–40	Nashville Kats	Nashville Municipal Auditorium		EvergreenNow	
SUN, April 6, 6:30 p.m. ET	Albany Firebirds	57–27	Salina Liberty	Tony's Pizza Events Center		Vice TV	

==== Week 5 ====
Date and time	Away team	Result	Home team	Arena	Attendance	Broadcast	Notes
SAT, April 12, 8:00 p.m. ET	Southwest Kansas Storm	22–20	Salina Liberty	Tony's Pizza Events Center		EvergreenNow	
SUN, April 13, 7:00 p.m. ET	Billings Outlaws	24–62	Albany Firebirds	MVP Arena		Vice TV	
SUN, April 13, 7:00 p.m. ET	Corpus Christi Tritons	61–21	Washington Wolfpack	Angel of the Winds Arena		EvergreenNow	

==== Week 6 ====
Date and time	Away team	Result	Home team	Arena	Attendance	Broadcast	Notes
THU, April 17, 10:00 p.m. ET	Nashville Kats	68–20	Washington Wolfpack	Angel of the Winds Arena		EvergreenNow	
SAT, April 19, 7:30 p.m. ET	Oregon Lightning	32–47	Salina Liberty	Tony’s Pizza Events Center		EvergreenNow	
SAT, April 19, 8:00 p.m. ET	Southwest Kansas Storm	47–40	Corpus Christi Tritons	American Bank Center		EvergreenNow	
SUN, April 20, 6:00 p.m. ET	Albany Firebirds	39–7	Billings Outlaws	First Interstate Arena	967	Vice TV	

==== Week 7 ====
Date and time	Away team	Result	Home team	Arena	Attendance	Broadcast	Notes
FRI, April 25, 8:00 p.m. ET	Salina Liberty	43–37	Billings Outlaws	First Interstate Arena	1,140	Vice TV	
FRI, April 25, 8:00 p.m. ET	Albany Firebirds	100–12	Corpus Christi Tritons	American Bank Center		EvergreenNow	
FRI, April 25, 9:30 p.m. ET	Washington Wolfpack	41–30	Oregon Lightning	First Interstate Bank Center		EvergreenNow	
SAT, April 26, 7:00 p.m. ET	Nashville Kats	41–37	Southwest Kansas Storm	United Wireless Arena		EvergreenNow	

==== Week 8 ====
Date and time	Away team	Result	Home team	Arena	Attendance	Broadcast	Notes
SAT, May 3, 7:00 p.m. ET	Billings Outlaws	31–49	Southwest Kansas Storm	United Wireless Arena		EvergreenNow	
SAT, May 3, 8:00 p.m. ET	Salina Liberty	58–64	Albany Firebirds	MVP Arena		EvergreenNow	
SUN, May 4, 7:00 p.m. ET	Oregon Lightning	37–9	Washington Wolfpack	Angel of the Winds Arena		Vice TV	

==== Week 9 ====
Date and time	Away team	Result	Home team	Arena	Attendance	Broadcast	Notes
SAT, May 10, 7:00 p.m. ET	Nashville Kats	55-71	Albany Firebirds	MVP Arena		Vice TV	
SAT, May 10, 8:00 p.m. ET	Washington Wolfpack	10-69	Billings Outlaws	First Interstate Arena		EvergreenNow	
MON, May 12, 8:00 p.m. ET	Corpus Christi Tritons	20-52	Oregon Lightning	First Interstate Bank Center		EvergreenNow	

==== Week 10 ====
Date and time	Away team	Result	Home team	Arena	Attendance	Broadcast	Notes
SAT, May 17, 8:00 p.m. ET	Southwest Kansas Storm	65-56	Billings Outlaws	First Interstate Arena		Vice TV	
SUN, May 18, 8:00 p.m. ET	Washington Wolfpack	20-52	Oregon Lightning	First Interstate Bank Center		EvergreenNow	

==== Week 11 ====
Date and time	Away team	Result	Home team	Arena	Attendance	Broadcast	Notes
SAT, May 24, 6:00 p.m. ET	Oregon Lightning	36-50	Nashville Kats	Nashville Municipal Auditorium		EvergreenNow	
SAT, May 24, 7:00 p.m. ET	Corpus Christi Tritons	27-64	Albany Firebirds	MVP Arena		EvergreenNow	
SAT, May 24, 8:00 p.m. ET	Billings Outlaws	41-60	Salina Liberty	Tony's Pizza Events Center		EvergreenNow	
SUN, May 25, 6:00 p.m. ET	Washington Wolfpack	7-63	Southwest Kansas Storm	United Wireless Arena		Vice TV	

==== Week 12 ====
Date and time	Away team	Result	Home team	Arena	Attendance	Broadcast	Notes
SAT, May 31, 7:30 p.m. ET	Washington Wolfpack	4-71	Salina Liberty	Tony's Pizza Events Center		EvergreenNow	
SUN, June 1, 6:00 p.m. ET	Nashville Kats	44-39	Corpus Christi Tritons	American Bank Center		EvergreenNow	
SUN, June 1, 8:00 p.m. ET	Oregon Lightning	7-58	Outlaws Arena Football Team	First Interstate Arena		Vice TV	

==== Week 13 ====
Date and time	Away team	Result	Home team	Arena	Attendance	Broadcast	Notes
SAT, June 7, 7:00 p.m. ET	Salina Liberty	65-63	Southwest Kansas Storm	United Wireless Arena		EvergreenNow	
SUN, June 8, 8:00 p.m. ET	Corpus Christi Tritons	24-40	Oregon Lightning	First Interstate Bank Center		Vice TV	
MON, June 9, 8:00 p.m. ET	Nashville Kats	34-51	Outlaws Arena Football Team	First Interstate Arena		EvergreenNow	

==== Week 14 ====
Date and time	Away Team	Result	Home team	Arena	Attendance	Broadcast	Notes
SAT, June 14, 7:00 p.m. ET	Washington Wolfpack	12-98	Albany Firebirds	MVP Arena	3,209	EvergreenNow	
SAT, June 14, 6:00 p.m. ET	Corpus Christi Tritons	18-80	Nashville Kats	F&M Bank Arena		EvergreenNow	
SAT, June 14, 8:00 p.m. ET	Outlaws Arena Football Team	40-38	Oregon Lightning	First Interstate Bank Center		EvergreenNow	
SUN, June 15, 6:30 p.m. ET	Southwest Kansas Storm	52-53	Salina Liberty	Tony's Pizza Events Center		Vice TV	

=== Postseason ===
The Top 4 teams at the end of the regular season make the Playoffs, with both semifinal games and the championship being held at the home arena of the higher ranked seed. Nashville opted to use their secondary arena, F&M Bank Arena in Clarksville, as their home for the playoffs.

Semifinals
MVP Arena
1	Albany Firebirds	75
4	Salina Liberty	44
F&M Bank Arena
2	Nashville Kats	48
3	SW Kansas Storm	43

Arena Crown 2025
MVP Arena
1	Albany Firebirds	60
2	Nashville Kats	57

== Awards ==
=== Players of the week ===
Week	Player
0	Michael Lawson (SWK)
1	Shawn McFarland (BIL)
2	Sam Castronova (ALB)
3	Dalton Cole (ORE)
4	Robert Jones Jr. (NAS)
5	Sam Castronova (ALB) (2)
6	Duane Brown (ALB)
7	Tracy Brooks Jr. (SAL)
8	Sam Castronova (ALB) (3)
9	Not Awarded
10	Jalen Morton (SWK)
11	Malik Honeycutt (SAL)
12	Tyler Kulka (NSH)
13	Javin Kilgo (SAL)

=== Postseason Awards ===
Award	Player
Most Valuable Player	Sam Castronova (ALB)
Offensive Player of the Year	Duane Brown (ALB)
Defensive Player of the Year	Michael Lawson (SWK)
Rookie of the Year	Jalen Morton (SWK)
Coach of the Year	Damon Ware (ALB)
Assistant Coach of the Year	Jack Scheck (SWK)

=== All-Arena Offense ===
Position	Player
QB	Sam Castronova
FB	Tracy Brooks
WR	Darius Prince
WR	Duane Brown
WR	Malik Honeycutt
OL	Brey Walker
OL	Colby Byrd
OL	Isaiah Hardy
K	Henry Nell

=== All-Arena Defense ===
Position	Player
DL	Ezekiel Rose
DL	Chei Hill
DL	Joe Golden
LB	Kerry Starks
LB	Derrick Maxwell
DB	Michael Lawson
DB	Shaun Lewis
DB	Markus Smith
