= Erick McIntosh =

American football player (born 1987)

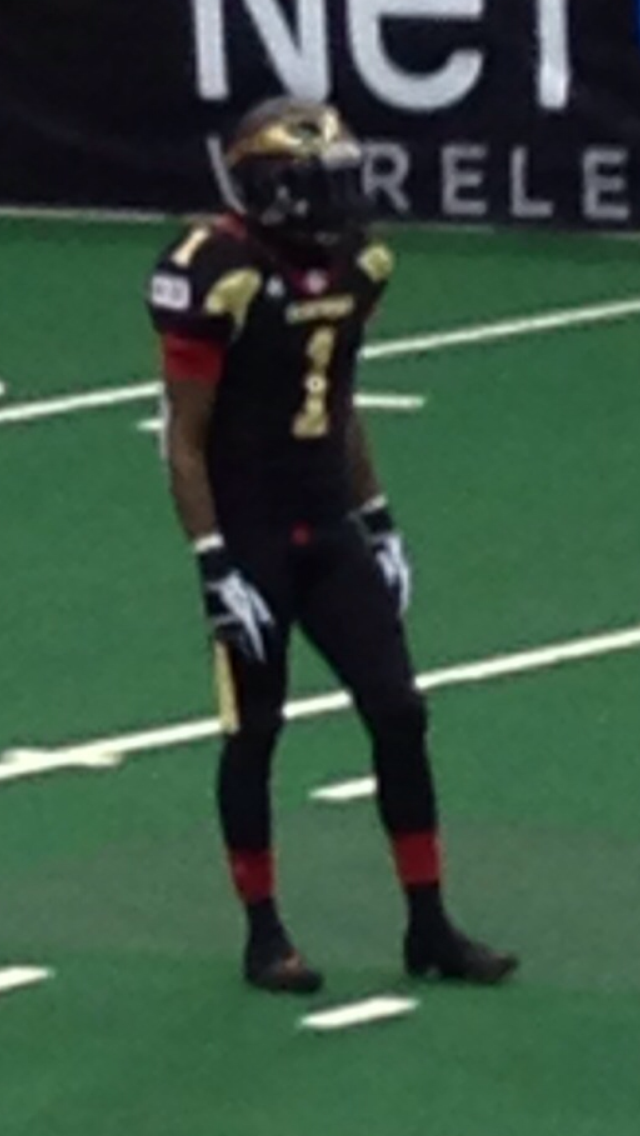
- McIntosh with the Iowa Barnstormers in 2013

Colorado Spartans
- Position: Defensive back

Personal information
- Born: May 27, 1987 (age 39); Fort Myers, Florida, U.S.
- Listed height: 5 ft 11 in (1.80 m)
- Listed weight: 180 lb (82 kg)

Career information
- High school: Lehigh Acres (FL)
- College: Florida Atlantic
- NFL draft: 2010: undrafted

Career history
- Tampa Bay Storm (2010–2012); Orlando Predators (2013)*; Iowa Barnstormers (2013); Orlando Predators (2014–2015); Jacksonville Sharks (2017); Albany Empire (2018); West Virginia Roughriders (2020); San Antonio Gunslingers (2022–2023); Jacksonville Sharks (2023); Louisiana VooDoo (2024); Salina Liberty (2024); Colorado Spartans (2025–present)
- * Offseason or practice squad member only

Awards and highlights
- NAL champion (2017); First-team All-NAL (2017)

Career AFL statistics
- Tackles: 319
- Pass breakups: 63
- Forced fumbles: 3
- Interceptions: 12
- Total TDs: 3
- Stats at ArenaFan.com

Erick McIntosh (born May 27, 1987) is an American professional football defensive back for the Colorado Spartans of the National Arena League (NAL). He played college football at Florida Atlantic University. He has also been a member of the Tampa Bay Storm, Orlando Predators, Iowa Barnstormers, Jacksonville Sharks, Albany Empire, West Virginia Roughriders, San Antonio Gunslingers, Louisiana VooDoo, and Salina Liberty.

== Early life ==
McIntosh played high school football at Lehigh Senior High School in Lehigh Acres, Florida. He recorded 62 tackles and an interception his senior year.

== College career ==
McIntosh played for the Florida Atlantic Owls from 2005 to 2009. He was redshirted in 2005. He started four games and compiled 53 tackles his senior season.

== Professional career ==
Pre-draft measurables
Height	Weight	40-yard dash	10-yard split	20-yard split	20-yard shuttle	Three-cone drill	Vertical jump	Broad jump
5 ft 10 in (1.78 m)	169 lb (77 kg)	4.45 s	1.65 s	2.66 s	4.42 s	7.03 s	33 1/2 in (0.85 m)	9 ft 3 in (2.82 m)
All values from Florida Atlantic Pro Day

McIntosh signed with the Tampa Bay Storm on May 26, 2010, after going undrafted in the 2010 NFL draft. He recorded 40 tackles and two interceptions his rookie year in 2010. He led the Storm in tackles with 102 and tied for the team-lead with four interceptions in 2011. McIntosh accumulated 72.5 tackles and two interceptions in 2012.

McIntosh was signed by the Orlando Predators on November 8, 2012.

McIntosh was traded to the Iowa Barnstormers for Gershom Jordan on March 12, 2013. He recorded 51.5 tackles and four interceptions in thirteen games in 2013.

McIntosh signed with the Orlando Predators on May 15, 2014. He collected 21.5 tackles in four starts in 2014.

McIntosh signed with the Jacksonville Sharks on December 14, 2016.

On March 24, 2018, McIntosh was assigned to the Albany Empire. On March 28, 2018, he was placed on physically unable to perform.

McIntosh signed with the San Antonio Gunslingers on November 17, 2021.
