= Albany Firebirds (2024) =

American football team in Albany, New York

- Current season
Logo

General information
- Founded: 2023
- Headquartered: Albany, New York at MVP Arena
- Colors: Black, orange, white (Primary); Red & blue (Supporting)
- Mascot: Spike
- Website: FirebirdsAF1.com

Personnel
- Owners: Mike Kwarta; Andy Guelcher; Rich Szesnat
- General manager: Damon Ware
- Head coach: Damon Ware
- President: Jeff Levack

Team history
- Albany Firebirds (2024–present)

League / conference affiliations
- Arena Football League (2024); Arena Football One (2025–present); East Division (2025–present)

Championships
- League championships: 1; 2025

The Albany Firebirds are a professional arena football team based in Albany, New York, that competes in Arena Football One (AF1). The team plays its home games at MVP Arena. The franchise started as an inaugural member of the ill-fated third iteration of the Arena Football League. This is the third time the Firebirds name has been used, first from 1990 to 2004 with the original Albany/Indiana Firebirds from the original AFL, and the Albany Firebirds of the af2 in 2009.

== Albany's arena football history (1990–2023) ==
Before the current franchise, the original Albany Firebirds franchise was started in 1990. It was the most successful Albany arena football franchise in history, going 88–60 and made the playoffs every season, except in 1990 and 1997. The team was most successful in 1999, going 13–3 and beating the Grand Rapids Rampage, Arizona Rattlers, and then beating the Orlando Predators in ArenaBowl XIII on their home turf, the Pepsi Arena. After the 2000 season, the Firebirds moved to Indianapolis becoming the Indiana Firebirds. The Firebirds were mainly unsuccessful in their new location, and folded in 2004.

After the Firebirds left, the Albany Conquest started a new era of Arena Football in Albany. The Conquest were owned by the former owners of the Albany Firebirds, and were successful early on, however, they were fairly unsuccessful towards the end of the af2. The team was rebranded to the Firebirds in 2009, lasting one season and a short playoff stint. The second incarnation of the Firebirds did not survive the transition to a unified Arena Football League in 2010.

After almost a decade, the Arena Football League in 2017 announced a new Albany arena football team named the Albany Empire. The Empire were very successful during their two years of existence, winning the league's regular season title in back to back years and eventually won ArenaBowl 32 in 2019; however, the team folded with the league's Chapter 7 bankruptcy the same year.

In 2020, the National Arena League announced a new Empire franchise in November 2020. The new Empire won two straight NAL Championships in 2021 and 2022.

In 2023, former National Football League (NFL) wide receiver and Super Bowl champion Antonio Brown bought shares of the Empire, joining with him was his father, Albany Firebirds' legend "Touchdown" Eddie Brown. The Empire were expelled from the NAL two months into the 2023 season due to Antonio Brown's wildly erratic behavior and failure to meet the team's financial obligations.

== Return of the Firebirds (2023–present) ==
After the Antonio Brown fiasco, Bob Belber, general manager of the arena, stated that New York's exceptionally high worker's compensation premium, running around $1,500,000, a full order of magnitude higher than other indoor squads, was the main factor in the NAL Empire's sale to Brown and its collapse, and the primary reason the Empire was not included among the inaugural teams in the 2024 Arena Football League relaunch; he stated that if the city wanted arena football to return, the state would have to lower that premium before the middle of August 2023. Belber was nonetheless "optimistic" that a resolution could be achieved and noted he had been in discussions with two reputable groups to potentially bring arena football back to the arena. On September 23, according to an unconfirmed report from WNYT, the team would revive the brand of the Albany Firebirds and play in the Indoor Football League; however, former Empire owner Mike Kwarta and former team president Jeff Levack stated that joining the IFL was not a certainty, as the Arena Football League remained in play, the name was still under review, and that the new team was able to renegotiate a 60% reduction in its worker's compensation cost which, while still unusually high, was good enough to allow the team to move forward. On October 2, 2023, the Albany Firebirds were announced to be joining the AFL. On October 6, the league announced the addition of the Firebirds, as well as the Southwest Kansas Storm, Wichita Regulators, Orlando Predators, Rapid City Marshals, and a team eventually known as the Washington Wolfpack.

In contrast to several of the other smaller midwestern teams that were covered under a merger agreement with Champions Indoor Football, the Firebirds indicated they had received the full cooperation of AFL management, which had honored all promises made to the team. Firebirds president Jeff Levack blamed the smaller teams for having "scared off" a television carriage agreement with NFL Network.

The Firebirds returned to the playoffs and made it all the way to the championship game in ArenaBowl XXXIII being played at American Dream Meadowlands in East Rutherford, New Jersey (a neutral site), only to lose to the upstart Billings Outlaws 46–41.

=== Leaving the AFL, Joining AF1 ===
On September 4, 2024, the Firebirds, along with the surviving members of the collapsed AFL, left the league and joined the newly-formed Arena Football One. In the 2025 season, they play in the East Division along with the Nashville Kats.

The Firebirds completed a perfect season in 2025, winning all ten regular season games and defeating Nashville in Arena Crown 2025, the AF1 championship. The team's offensive core signed with the Memphis Showboats following the season; though all of the signings were eventually voided when the Showboats were folded and all four players went unclaimed in the subsequent dispersal draft. During the same offseason the Firebirds signed quarterback Ja'Rome Johnson who previously played for the Indoor Football League's Vegas Knight Hawks winning the league's 2024 MVP and helping them win the 2025 IFL championship. Johnson left the team in the offseason. Josh Kulka, the younger brother of Nashville Kats quarterback Tyler Kulka, joined the Firebirds in early 2026 and won the starting quarterback position after Sam Castronova (who had been among those who signed with the Showboats) received a last-minute contract from the UFL's Houston Gamblers and backup Robert McCoy had been traded to the Oregon Lightning. Castronova returned to the Firebirds after the Gamblers released him. Kulka would return to the starting position late in the season both to protect Castronova from potential injury and to allow him to attend to a family matter.
