= Louisiana VooDoo =

American indoor football team

- Current season
Logo

General information
- Founded: 2023
- Folded: 2024
- Headquartered: Blackham Coliseum in Lafayette, Louisiana
- Colors: Purple, red, black, green, yellow, tan
- VooDooAFL.com

Personnel
- Owners: Arena Football Management, LLC (majority)
- Head coach: James Shiver

Team history
- Louisiana VooDoo (2024)

Home fields
- Blackham Coliseum (2024)

League / conference affiliations
- Arena Football League (2024)

The Louisiana VooDoo were a professional arena football team based in Lafayette, Louisiana. They were members of the revived Arena Football League whose inaugural season in 2024 was cut short due to financial issues with the league under the league's previous administration and were left out of the remaining season as a result. This VooDoo franchise is named after, but otherwise unrelated to, the New Orleans VooDoo of the original AFL.

== VooDoo history ==
=== New Orleans (2004–2008, 2011–2015) ===
The VooDoo name is traced back to the original New Orleans VooDoo that was founded in 2002 as an expansion team in the original Arena Football League by New Orleans Saints owner Tom Benson. They were the second official team to play in New Orleans after the New Orleans Night, who played at the Louisiana Superdome in 1991 and 1992. The VooDoo had moderate success under Benson before originally folding in 2008. A second New Orleans VooDoo franchise began as the Bossier–Shreveport Battle Wings in af2 in 2000 and joined the reconfigured AFL in 2010 before then-owner Dan Newman acquired the rights to the VooDoo name, logo and colors. The second VooDoo did not fare any better and were taken over by the AFL under then-commissioner Scott Butera in 2015 due to ongoing financial issues within the league and poor attendance at the Smoothie King Center. The team folded at season's end when a new owner or ownership group could not be found. The original team trademarks (name, logo, colors and identity) are now the property of the current AFL's owners, G6 Sports Group.

=== Louisiana VooDoo (2024) ===
In an interview with ArenaFan.com, published in February 2023, then-AFL commissioner Lee A. Hutton III said that there had been discussions with potential ownership groups in New Orleans to relaunch the VooDoo when the league resumed play in 2024. Louisiana was among the regions named by Hutton in a July 2023 announcement of the league's inaugural locations. After Bossier City ruled itself out due to schedule conflicts, contemporary reports indicated that the league was aiming to instead put the team in Lake Charles, Louisiana. Bossier City was another location considered for the Louisiana team, but their home arena had too many schedule conflicts to accommodate a team in the 2024 season. The new team, which retained the VooDoo name (as the Louisiana VooDoo), was unveiled on November 3, 2023. This version, though, was not directly tied to the original New Orleans VooDoo. Their head coach was James Shiver, a longtime coach in the area.

The VooDoo were to have played in Lake Charles, but relocated to Lafayette, Louisiana, and would play at Blackham Coliseum instead. Reasoning for the last minute switch was the lack of communication between the team and the management of the arena, though the arena countered that the VooDoo was delinquent on rent and had failed to show proof of any insurance. The league would pay for insurance and rent for the VooDoo's lone game at Blackham. Billings Outlaws owner and ardent league critic Steve Titus indicated the VooDoo were among several league-controlled teams that were shut down after Week 2. The University of Louisiana at Lafayette indicated plans to hold the Minnesota Myth, the legal entity that effectively owned the VooDoo, liable for rent for the four remaining games the VooDoo never played.
