= Isaac Harker =

American gridiron football player (born 1995)

Profile
- Position: Quarterback

Personal information
- Born: October 26, 1995 (age 31); Lebanon, Indiana, U.S.
- Listed height: 6 ft 0 in (1.83 m)
- Listed weight: 195 lb (88 kg)

Career information
- High school: Lebanon
- College: Indiana State (2014–2017); Colorado Mines (2018)
- NFL draft: 2019: undrafted

Career history
- Saskatchewan Roughriders (2019–2021); BC Lions (2022)*; Billings Outlaws (2024)
- * Offseason or practice squad member only

Awards and highlights
- ArenaBowl champion (2024); ArenaBowl MVP (2024); AFL MVP (2024)

Career CFL statistics
- Passing completions: 70
- Passing attempts: 97
- Passing yards: 706
- TD–INT: 0–5
- Stats at CFL.ca

Isaac Harker (born October 26, 1995) is an American professional football quarterback. He played college football at Indiana State and Colorado Mines. He played in the CFL for the Saskatchewan Roughriders and the Arena Football League for the Billings Outlaws. He was the professional QB who did the stunt double throwing work for Glen Powell in the Chad Powers TV series.

== College career ==
Harker played college football for Indiana State from 2014 to 2017 and for Colorado Mines in 2018. He finished his college career with totals of 7,117 passing yards, 61 passing touchdowns, 26 interceptions, and five rushing touchdowns.

== Professional career ==
=== Saskatchewan Roughriders ===
In April 2019, Harker signed with the Saskatchewan Roughriders of the Canadian Football League (CFL). Harker made his professional debut for the Riders in the first game of the season following injuries to starting quarterback Zach Collaros and backup Cody Fajardo. In his debut Harker completed eight of 14 pass attempts for 114 yards with two interceptions. His rookie year he secured home-field advantage for the Roughriders in a game November 2 against the Edmonton Elks, completing 23 of 28 passes for 213 yards en route to a victory.

=== BC Lions ===
On February 9, 2022, it was announced the BC Lions had signed Harker to a contract. However, he was released just prior to training camp on May 14, 2022.

=== Billings Outlaws ===
Harker played for the Billings Outlaws of the Arena Football League (AFL) in 2024, earning AFL MVP and ArenaBowl XXXIII MVP honors.

== Career statistics ==
=== CFL ===
Legend
*	Led the league
**Bold**	Career best

Year	Team	Games		Passing								Rushing			
Year	Team	GP	GS	Comp	Att	Pct	Yards	TD	INT	AVG	Rtg	Att	Yards	AVG	TDS
2019	SSK	**18**	**1**	**44**	**61**	72.1	**467**	0	**3**	**7.7**	**73.6**	2	5	2.5	0
2020	SSK	0	0	DNP											
2021	SSK	14	**1**	26	36	**72.2**	239	0	2	6.6	66.8	**3**	**14**	**4.7**	0
Career		32	2	70	97	72.2	706	0	5	7.3	71.1	5	19	3.8	0

=== AFL ===
Year	Team	Games		Passing								Rushing			
Year	Team	GP	GS	Comp	Att	Pct	Yards	TD	INT	AVG	Rtg	Att	Yards	AVG	TDS
2024	BIL	9	9	124	190	65.2	1,558	38	2	8.2	125.2	10	25	2.5	0

=== College ===
Year	Team	GP	Passing								Rushing			
Year	Team	GP	Comp	Att	Pct	Yards	TD	INT	AVG	Rtg	Att	Yards	TDS	AVG
2015	Indiana State	3	2	4	50%	16	0	0	4.0	60.4	10	66	1	6.6
2016	Indiana State	10	214	370	58%	2,559	19	8	6.9	87.2	64	-154	1	-2.4
2017	Indiana State	9	59	114	52%	684	3	6	6.0	57.1	29	6	0	0.2
2018	Colorado Mines	12	280	421	67%	3,858	39	12	9.2	168.4	61	142	3	2.3
Totals		34	555	909	61%	7,117	61	26	6.5	96.0	164	60	5	1.7
