= Wichita Regulators =

American indoor football team

- Current season
Logo

General information
- Founded: 2023
- Folded: 2025
- Headquartered: Park City, Kansas at Hartman Arena
- Colors: Black, orange & blue
- ICTRegs.com

Personnel
- Owner: Chris Zachary
- General manager: Vacant
- Head coach: Vacant

Team history
- Wichita (ICT) Regulators (2023-2025)

Home fields
- Hartman Arena (2023–2025)

League / conference affiliations
- Independent (2023); Arena Football League (2024); Arena Football One (2026, never played)

The Wichita Regulators were a professional indoor football team based in Park City, Kansas. They were announced as one of the inaugural teams for the revived Arena Football League (AFL) for 2024, beginning play as an independent semi-pro team in 2023 at Hartman Arena. In 2025, they were to have become inaugural members of the newly-formed Arena Football One (AF1), however have gone dormant, then folded in 2025.

== History ==
=== The beginning ===
The Regulators began as an independent semi-professional indoor team in 2022 playing a five-game schedule of games, all games at Hartman Arena. The initial coaching staff featured Carlos Cavanaugh Sr. as Head Coach, Rick Lee as Running Game Coordinator, Justin Hurley as Defensive Line Coach and Curtis Williams as Secondary Coach. They finished 5–0 in their inaugural season. They were set to join Champions Indoor Football before that league was absorbed into the second revival of the Arena Football League.

=== Wichita returns to the AFL ===
Four years after the AFL folded for the second time, it was announced on February 1, 2023, that the league intended on relaunching in 2024. On July 18, the 16 intended market cities were announced; Kansas was not initially among the 16 regions receiving a team but would join with the league's eventual merger with Champions Indoor Football.

Steven Titus, the owner of the CIF's Gillette Mustangs and Billings Outlaws, joined the AFL in the summer of 2023, choosing the Outlaws as the team that would join, since the arena in Gillette, Wyoming could not accommodate rebound nets needed for the AFL and league bylaws did not at the time allow an owner (other than central league office) to own multiple teams. Since the sale of the team was unfeasible with the CIF merging with the AFL, Titus indicated he would transfer the Mustangs' CIF, later AFL, rights to a team in Kansas, giving an opening for the Regulators to join the league.

On October 5, 2023, the AFL announced that the Regulators would join the CIF's two existing Kansas teams, the Southwest Kansas Storm and Salina Liberty, in the AFL, as it merged with CIF. They will be members of the Central Division.

It is the sixth indoor team to play in Wichita and the first arena-formatted team since the Wichita Stealth played in AF2 from 2000 to 2004. Other teams that played include the Wichita Warlords, Wichita Aviators, Wichita Wild, and Wichita Force.

=== Move to Arena Football One, then folding ===
On September 4, 2024, the Regulators, along with the other seven surviving members of the collapsed AFL, left that league and became charter members of the newly-formed Arena Football One set to play in 2025. They were to play in the Central Division along with the Corpus Christi Tritons, Salina Liberty and Southwest Kansas Storm. However, the team owner Chris Zachary announced on social media that they would go dormant for 2025, but would return for the 2026 season and beyond. However, their website and social have been shut down, and fellow Kansas-based former CIF teams Salina and Southwest Kansas left AF1, leading to speculation of the team's folding without explanation.
