= Desmond Bland =

American gridiron football player (born 1998)

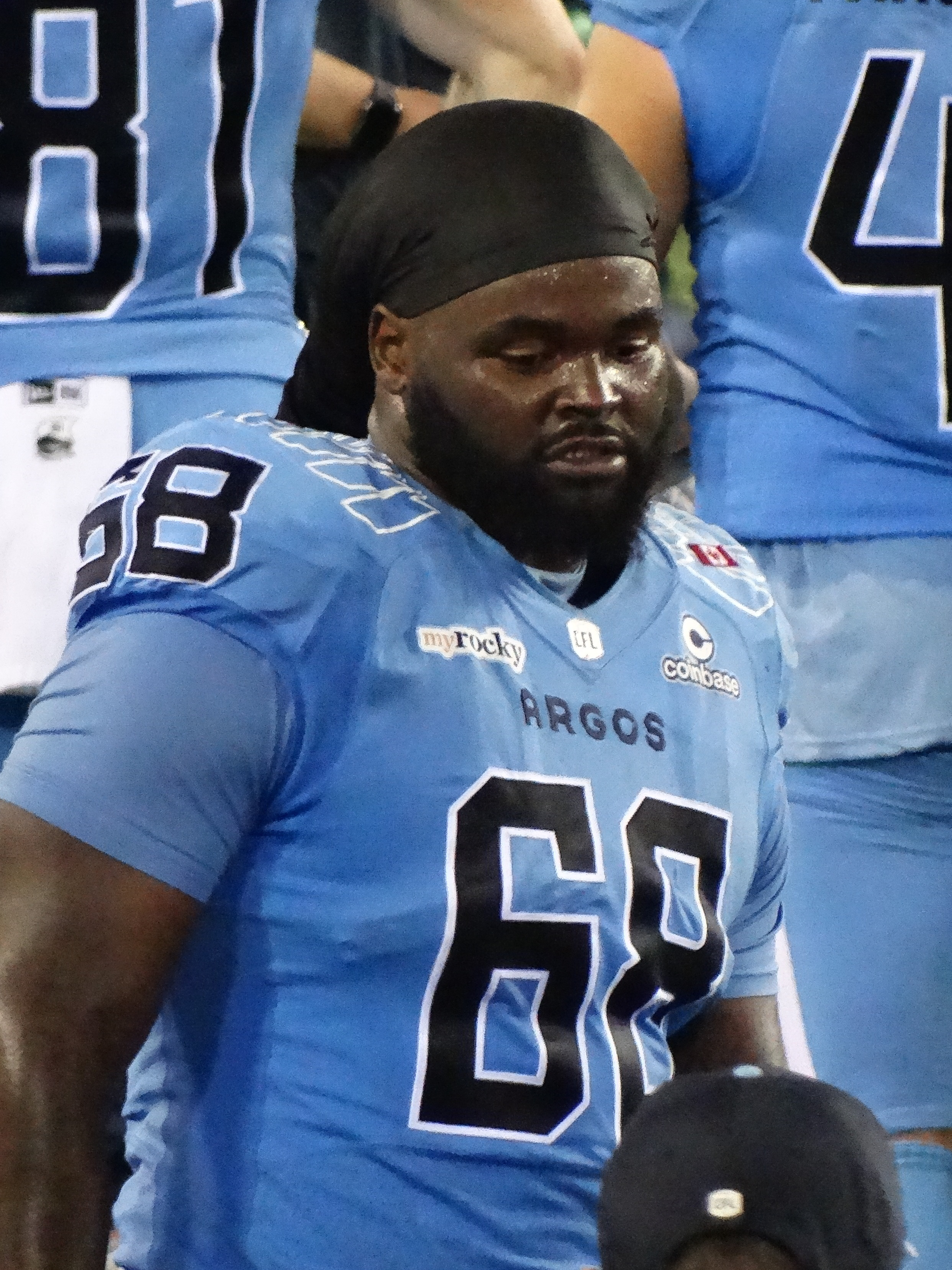
- Bland with the Toronto Argonauts in 2026

No. 68 – Toronto Argonauts
- Position: Offensive lineman
- Roster status: Active
- CFL status: American

Personal information
- Born: August 3, 1998 (age 28); Chicago, Illinois, U.S.
- Listed height: 6 ft 4 in (1.93 m)
- Listed weight: 300 lb (136 kg)

Career information
- College: West Florida (2020–2022); Arizona Western College (2016–2018)
- NFL draft: 2022: undrafted

Career history
- 2023: San Diego Strike Force
- 2024: Southwest Kansas Storm*
- 2025: Vegas Knight Hawks
- 2026–present: Toronto Argonauts
- * Offseason or practice squad member only
- Stats at CFL.ca

Desmond Bland (born August 3, 1998) is an American professional football offensive lineman for the Toronto Argonauts of the Canadian Football League (CFL).

== College career ==
Bland first played college football for the Arizona Western College Matadors from 2016 to 2018. He then transferred to the University of West Florida to play for the West Florida Argonauts, playing in nine games from 2021 to 2022 after the cancellation of the 2020 season.

== Professional career ==
=== San Diego Strike Force ===
Bland played for the San Diego Strike Force during their 2023 season.

=== Southwest Kansas Storm ===
Bland signed with the Southwest Kansas Storm on October 23, 2023, but did not play as he attended the New Orleans Saints rookie minicamp.

=== Vegas Knight Hawks ===
Bland signed with the Vegas Knight Hawks for the 2025 season where he played in all 19 games, including the 2025 IFL Championship. Highlighted by a kickoff return touchdown.

=== Toronto Argonauts ===
On December 12, 2025, it was announced that Bland had signed with the Toronto Argonauts. He earned a starting spot in training camp and played in his first CFL game on June 12, 2026, against the Montreal Alouettes.
