= Cedric Walker =

American football player and coach (born 1971)

Kentucky Barrels
- Title: Defensive back

Personal information
- Born: February 16, 1971 (age 55); Lufkin, Texas, U.S.
- Listed height: 6 ft 0 in (1.83 m)
- Listed weight: 205 lb (93 kg)

Career information
- High school: Lufkin (Lufkin, Texas)
- College: Stephen F. Austin (1990–1993)

Career history

Playing
- Charlotte Rage (1996); Orlando Predators (1996); Arizona Rattlers (1997–2000); Albany Firebirds (2001); Chicago Rush (2001–2003); Austin Wranglers (2004–2005); Las Vegas Gladiators (2006)

Coaching
- Bakersfield Blitz (2006) DC; Everett Hawks (2007); Tri-Cities Fever (2008); Green Bay Blizzard (2009) (DC); Milwaukee Iron/Mustangs (2010–2011) (DC); San Jose SaberCats (2012–2015) (DC); Baltimore Brigade (2018–2019) (DC); Spokane Shock (2022) (HC/DC); Wyoming Mustangs (2022–2023) (HC/DC); Billings Outlaws (2024–2025) (HC/DC); Kentucky Barrels (2026–present)

Awards and highlights
- 3× ArenaBowl champion (1997, 2015, 2024)

Career AFL statistics
- Tackles: 614
- Pass Breakups: 84
- Forced Fumbles: 11
- Fumbles Recovered: 12
- Interceptions: 23
- Stats at ArenaFan.com

Cedric Walker (born February 10, 1971) is an American former football defensive back and coach who is currently the head coach of the Kentucky Barrels of Arena Football One.

== Playing career ==
Walker played football at Stephen F. Austin University; once his stint there concluded, he signed with the AFL's Charlotte Rage. Walker played for a succession of AFL teams over his ten-season career; these included the Orlando Predators, Arizona Rattlers, Indiana Firebirds, Chicago Rush, Austin Wranglers, and Las Vegas Gladiators. At the end of his AFL Career, Walker had amassed some 522 solo tackles (614 total); this was (at the time) the league's seventh-highest total. Walker also won one ArenaBowl as a player; this came with the Arizona Rattlers in 1997.

== Coaching career ==
Walker took up a career in coaching following his retirement as a player. He began as the defensive coordinator for the Bakersfield Blitz of the AF2 in 2006; following a successful stint there (the Blitz allowed the second-fewest points of any AF2 team that season), Walker became head coach of the AF2's Everett Hawks. In Walker's first season at the helm, the Hawks posted a pedestrian 8–8 record; they made the playoffs, however, behind the league's third-ranked defense. In 2008, Walker became head coach of the AF2's Tri-Cities Fever; his stint there, however, proved unsuccessful (the Fever went 4-12 in 2008). Walker was fired by the team at the end of the season. He was hired by the AF2's Green Bay Blizzard in 2009 as a defensive coordinator, to mixed results; while the Blizzard were average in most defensive categories, they led the AF2 in sacks.

Walker's coaching career received a huge boost in 2010. That year, he was hired by the Milwaukee Iron of the Arena Football League as a defensive coordinator. The Iron allowed 903 points in Walker's first year (the eleventh-highest mark in the 14-team league); despite this, the team's defense finished second in sacks (25.5) and fourth in interceptions (20). In 2011, Walker's second year as defensive coordinator, the team's defense made major strides; notably, it allowed the fewest yards (266.8 per game) and fourth-fewest points (872) of any AFL defense that season.

Walker was hired to be the defensive coordinator of the AFL's San Jose SaberCats prior to the AFL's 2012 season. In San Jose, Walker inherited a defense that had allowed 1080 points the season before; this was the third-worst total in the 18-team league. Under Walker's guidance, the SaberCats' defense became the league's most dominant. In 2012, the SaberCats allowed 1027 points (a 53-point improvement over 2011). The defense was aided, in part, by the additions of Joe Sykes and Jason Stewart to the defensive line. Sykes recorded 16.0 sacks in 2012 (a record that stood until 2015, when Sykes himself broke it with 18.5); for this, he was named the league's Defensive Player of the Year. In 2013, Walker's second year, the SaberCats allowed only 877 points (a staggering 150-point improvement over 2012). In two years, Walker had turned the AFL's third-worst unit (by points allowed) into its second best. The unit was led by the return of defensive back Clevan Thomas, who had been elected to the AFL's Hall of Fame one year prior. Thomas led the league with fifteen interceptions (six of which were returned for touchdowns); he joined Sykes as the SaberCats' second consecutive Defensive Player of the Year.

In 2014, the SaberCats' defense established itself as the league's best. The team allowed only 723 points all season (a 154-point improvement over 2013) while holding eleven of its eighteen opponents to fewer than 40 points. This was the league's lowest total by 55 points. For the third consecutive year, a SaberCats defender won the league's Defensive Player of the Year Award; this year's recipient was Jason Stewart, who led the Cats' vaunted defensive line with 12.5 sacks.

In Walker's fourth year, the SaberCats' defense performed historically well. Despite injuries to the team's secondary (particularly the losses of Virgil Gray and Eric Crocker to injury), the SaberCats allowed a staggeringly-low 662 points (a 61-point improvement over 2014's league-best figure). This was the league's best total by 161 points. All told, the 2015 SaberCats allowed only 36.8 points per game; this represented the league's lowest per-game total in well over twenty years. At the end of the season, the SaberCats defeated the Jacksonville Sharks in ArenaBowl XXVIII; this gave Walker his second AFL Championship (and first as a defensive coordinator).

On March 27, 2018, it was announced that Walker would be the defensive coordinator of the Baltimore Brigade.

Walker joined the Wyoming Mustangs of Champions Indoor Football as head coach in 2022. When the Mustangs folded as a result of CIF's merger into the Arena Football League (2024), Mustangs owner Steven Titus retained Walker and assigned him to Titus's other team the Billings Outlaws. Walker coached the Outlaws to a victory in ArenaBowl XXXIII in 2024. On August 2, 2025, the Outlaws and Walker announced that, by mutual decision, Walker would no longer be the Outlaws' head coach.

In August 2025, Walker was hired as the head coach of the Kentucky Barrels, an expansion team in AF1.
