= 2024 Arena Football League season =

2024 AFL season
- League: Arena Football League (2024)
- Sport: Arena football
- Duration: April 27 – June 29, 2024
- Teams: ~~16 (at start)~~ 8 (after reorganization)
- TV partner(s): ~~NFL Network (never materialized)~~ Gray Television, VYRE, Arenafootball.live; CBS Sports Network (playoffs only)

ArenaBowl XXXIII
- Finals champions: Billings Outlaws
- Runners-up: Albany Firebirds
- Finals MVP: Isaac Harker

Active, Folded

The 2024 Arena Football League season was the first and only season in the new version of the Arena Football League (AFL). The 2024 season began April 27 with six games. The league was overshadowed by numerous problems and controversies, especially during the first few weeks of the season, including the closures of multiple franchises, numerous cancellations of games, the abrupt departure of Philadelphia Soul players and staff, and the lack of payments handed out to most teams, resulting in questions about the league's future. The original commissioner of the league, Lee Hutton, was ultimately removed from his post following week 3 and was replaced with Nashville Kats president Jeff Fisher as interim commissioner in a unanimous vote among the remaining team owners. Eight of the 16 teams that started the 2024 season survived to the end of the regular season, with the Billings Outlaws winning ArenaBowl XXXIII over the de facto defending champion Albany Firebirds on July 19; the 8 surviving teams formed Arena Football One.

== Background ==
A year after its second shutdown, the Arena Football League trademarks and logo were bought out by Darren Arbet in 2020. Arbet is a former San Jose SaberCats head coach and was the head coach of the Indoor Football League's Bay Area Panthers. The trademark remained inactive until 2022, when a new website was set up. The website was first noticed on December 12, 2022. Two days later, a tweet from the league account was posted under a post from Tim Capper about the death of John Gregory (head coach of the Iowa Barnstormers), reading "Our thoughts and prayers have gone out to John's family." This tweet was later deleted, along with all the other tweets the Arena Football League Twitter account had up to that point. The new management assumed control of the Instagram account on around December 27 and deleted all posts on around January 6, and then took control of the Facebook account on January 16. On January 16, 2023, after a month of the first tweet, the Twitter account posted a picture of the league’s 2003-18 logo, with the caption #NewProfilePic.

On February 1, 2023, the Arena Football League confirmed the rumors and announced its plans to return in 2024, over a year after the rights to the league were purchased by an investment group called F1 Sports & Entertainment. The relaunched league, led by chairman Chris Chetty, president Anthony Rossi, president of operations Shan Singh, and commissioner Lee A. Hutton III, was to feature 16 teams playing a 10-game season over the course of the summer months, followed by a postseason format that was later revealed on June 12, 2024. The league returned its logo to the one used from 2003 to 2018. The new iteration of the league was to feature "streaming, betting, technology, (and) virtual reality" elements, per Rossi.

In a February 2023 interview with ArenaFan.com, the commissioner revealed that there had been discussions with potential ownership groups in New Orleans to relaunch the New Orleans VooDoo. In an April interview, he revealed that they were looking to put teams in Philadelphia, St. Louis, Minneapolis, Salt Lake City, Phoenix, and Jacksonville, while they also received offers to put a team in Mexico City.

== Teams ==
=== Pre-launch ===
On July 18, 2023, TMZ Sports initially reported that the AFL had selected the following cities that would be receiving new teams: Austin, Texas; Boise, Idaho; Bakersfield, California; Chicago, Illinois; Denver, Colorado; St. Paul, Minnesota; Lake Charles, Louisiana; Cincinnati, Ohio; Orlando, Florida; Salem, Oregon; Philadelphia, Pennsylvania; St. Louis, Missouri; Tallahassee, Florida; Nashville, Tennessee; Everett, Washington; and Odessa, Texas. The league made the statement official on their Twitter page. Managers of Cincinnati's main indoor arena, the Heritage Bank Center, refuted the report, stating they had rejected the AFL's advances, while the two college/university-owned arenas in the city both said they had not been approached and also would not be open to hosting the league. Representatives with Lake Charles stated that their conversations with the league were still in preliminary phases (having advanced only to the point of informing the league what days their arena was available), and that although they were open to hosting the league, "it’s closer to not being true than being true at this time." The city of Salem was also unaware of the AFL having discussions for placing a team in the city, but were open to hearing more about their plans. In Everett, the manager of the city's only major arena, Angel of the Winds Arena, stated that he was only contacted by a potential ownership group several days after the announcement of teams. When reached for comment, Hutton stated he would only reveal information "on our time." The league eventually secured an agreement with Angel of the Winds Arena in late September; the owners of the Everett franchise, led by the owner of the local semi-pro Everett Royals, noted that he had acquired the franchise after contacting the league after the announcement of cities in hopes of getting Royals players onto the squad, only to find that the league had not yet lined up an owner for the city's team at the time.

On the same day as the TMZ report, the Orlando Predators and West Texas Warbirds (Odessa), who were both playing in the National Arena League, stated they were joining the new AFL, although the Warbirds later removed their Facebook post within the first week. (The Warbirds later announced that they would be instead branding as the "Desert Hawks" for the 2024 season.) In a statement to Philadelphia media, Hutton stated that the Philadelphia Soul was also expected to be revived, with Soul co-owner Ron Jaworski returning, if not as an owner then as a consultant. Jaworski denied Hutton's claims.

Among cities considered but ultimately not included, Atlantic City's financial terms were considered unrealistic, Bossier City, Louisiana had too many schedule conflicts for 2024 but expressed interest in 2025, while the Albany Empire—returning champions from the last AFL season in 2019—expressed interest in returning, but was initially unable to accept because of the excessive cost of worker's compensation in the state. (The worker's compensation issue was later resolved, and the league announced a new iteration of the Albany Firebirds would join in 2024.) Neither Buffalo, nor Rochester, New York were considered, despite some interest from Bob Bartosiewicz, who previously owned the Rochester Raiders; after the season, Stevie Johnson revealed that he owned the trademarks to the Buffalo Destroyers, the AFL's previous team in Buffalo, but would instead be trying to revive the team to the Indoor Football League. The Gillette Mustangs were rejected after the league deemed the team's home arena had a roof too short to properly accommodate the league's rebound nets.

In late 2023, three supposed expansion teams were announced as the "California Grizzlies", "Minnesota Myth", and "St. Louis Rampage". The teams were announced on their respective Instagram and X accounts. However, league commissioner Hutton released a statement regarding the addition of these new team names. He stated on his X account, "Any information that concerns the Arena Football League must be endorsed by me or our CEO otherwise it is not reliable. AFL team name announcements will be coming soon for all locations. It is an exciting time as we make our mark to be bigger and better." The Rampage later admitted to being a hoax supported by fans of the St. Louis Battlehawks. Defector Media traced the California Grizzlies to Tim Carbajal, who operates a semi-pro spring football team in the area. Carbajal confirmed the Grizzlies' existence—and confirmed that he, under an alias, had contacted Mechanics Bank Arena in Bakersfield inquiring about using the facility—but otherwise stated he was not at liberty to discuss further details due to Hutton's gag order. The Myth were later revealed as Hutton's own franchise, nominally owned by his wife Diana, who is partner in the Hutton law firm with him. Observers in Boise noticed that the owner of Idaho Central Arena had renewed the domain name for the Boise Burn, a former af2 franchise, weeks before the announcement, and that the AFL was not bringing on the Idaho Horsemen, who play in nearby Nampa. The proposed Tallahassee team was to be the Capital City Cyclones, as announced by a business associate of Cyclones owner Alton Walker, but the Cyclones instead reverted to its previous name as the Tampa Bay Tornadoes and joined the International Football Alliance.

On August 29, 2023, the league officially announced that the Billings Outlaws, formerly of Champions Indoor Football, would be the inaugural members of the new version of the league. On August 31, the West Texas Desert Hawks (formerly the Warbirds) were the second team confirmed. The Orlando Predators were the third team announced on September 25; with the announcement of the Predators, the league announced its intent to instead have 20 teams in its 2024 season, as it planned on absorbing three additional teams from Champions Indoor Football. On October 5, 2023, Hutton appeared with the owners of three remaining CIF teams—the ICT Regulators of the Wichita metropolitan area, Salina Liberty and Southwest Kansas Storm in Dodge City— and CIF commissioner Mike McCoy as they announced the remainder of that league was merging into the AFL, with McCoy being named AFL deputy commissioner three weeks later.

On October 2, 2023, it was announced that the Albany Firebirds name would be brought back and were to play in the AFL for 2024. On October 6, 2023, it was officially announced that the Orlando Predators, Billings Outlaws, Southwest Kansas Storm, Salina Liberty, Wichita Regulators, and an Everett AFL team were announced. On October 25, 2023, the Oregon Blackbears were officially announced as the league's newest team. The league claimed that Kayvon Thibodeaux was the majority owner of the Blackbears, but Thibodeaux later denied this, stating that "the league used my name for publicity." The league announced revivals of the Nashville Kats, Philadelphia Soul and Chicago Rush on November 1.

On November 16, 2023, in the AFL relaunch event, Hutton revealed the 16 teams who were to play in the 2024 season, while he mentioned the league might expand in the future to 24 teams. He also referred to the original list of cities and revealed that other "leagues and individuals" (none specified) were trying to cancel teams contracts with the arenas and participated in "anti-competitive practices" to try to disturb the league's progress, which caused a move to different locations.

=== Mid-season changes ===
On May 2, 2024, the Iowa Rampage announced it had folded after one game, citing multiple broken promises from league management to cover increased expenses. The Georgia Force abruptly folded a few days later and on May 9, the Soul suspended operations for the remainder of the 2024 season with hopes of returning in 2025.

On May 13, 2024, in an email from owner Diana Hutton, the Minnesota Myth became the fourth team to suspend operations, blaming it on an inability to raise necessary sponsorships because of "negative publicity" and accusing the owners of "sabotage" in order to force her husband Lee Hutton to resign as commissioner; Hutton confirmed the team's closure publicly a day later.

In a press release, the Outlaws indicated that the league would contract to 10 teams for the remainder of the season: Washington, Billings, Rapid City, Southwest Kansas, Salina, West Texas, Wichita, Albany, Nashville, and Orlando, with the league remaining open to continue scheduling games with Oregon and "other teams not mentioned." The Blackbears announced an agreement to continue in the league for the rest of the 2024 season on May 17. The Cedar Rapids River Kings, recently severed from American Indoor Football due to owner misconduct, were added to the schedule as a non-league member for Week 5. Rapid City folded on May 24, due to continued turmoil within the organization. Oregon was again removed from the league on May 28, as incoming president Jared Widman announced that the league would be moving forward with only nine teams.

Multiple sources indicated the West Texas Desert Hawks had ended their season June 18, four days before their last scheduled game and nine days after they had quietly fired their head coach. Salina acknowledged the maneuver and scheduled the River Kings as their opponent for the planned matchup against West Texas. The league confirmed that the Desert Hawks had withdrawn from their final game "for reasons that we will not disclose" on June 20 but that the team had not folded. Desert Hawks owner Zack Bugg folded the team officially on June 21, citing arena concessions money disputes, lingering issues tied to Hutton's promises, and the alleged embezzlement of the money Bugg had fronted to NFL Network to televise a game that the network never televised.

=== Postseason ===
The AFL announced the updated playoff schedule for the 2024 season on June 12, 2024. There were six teams that made the playoffs and they started on July 6, 2024, with two first-round games. In the semifinal round, July 13, 2024, the lowest-seeded winner of the first-round matchup played the top seed, while the runner-up hosted the highest-seeded. All games for the first two rounds were hosted by the higher seed. ArenaBowl XXXIII waa to be hosted at a neutral site, later revealed to be the American Dream Center in East Rutherford, New Jersey, on Friday, July 19, 2024.

=== Teams ===
Team	Location	Arena	Capacity	Founded	Folded	Head coach
Active
Albany Firebirds	Albany, New York	MVP Arena	13,785	2023	-	Damon Ware
Billings Outlaws	Billings, Montana	MetraPark First Interstate Arena	8,700	2021	-	Cedric Walker
Nashville Kats	Nashville, Tennessee	Nashville Municipal Auditorium	8,000	2023	-	Dean Cokinos
Orlando Predators	Orlando, Florida	Kia Center	17,192	2019	2025	E. J. Burt
Salina Liberty	Salina, Kansas	Tony's Pizza Events Center	7,583	2015	-	Heron O'Neal
Southwest Kansas Storm	Dodge City, Kansas	United Wireless Arena	5,300	2021	-	Gary Thomas
Washington Wolfpack	Everett, Washington	Angel of the Winds Arena	8,149	2023	-	J. R. Wells
Wichita Regulators	Park City, Kansas	Hartman Arena	5,000	2023	2025	Clinton Solomon
Folded
Georgia Force*	Atlanta, Georgia	Georgia State Convocation Center**	8,000	2023	2024	Durwood Roquemore
Iowa Rampage*	Council Bluffs, Iowa	Mid-America Center**	6,793	2023	2024	Tyus Jackson
Louisiana VooDoo*	Lafayette, Louisiana	Blackham Coliseum	7,450	2023	2024	James Shiver
Minnesota Myth*	Minneapolis, Minnesota	Target Center	17,500	2023	2024	Rickey Foggie
Oregon Blackbears*	Salem, Oregon	Oregon State Fairgrounds Pavilion	5,000	2023	2024	Chuck Jones
Philadelphia Soul*	Philadelphia, Pennsylvania	CURE Insurance Arena (3 games)**	7,605	2003	2024	Patrick Pimmel
Rapid City Marshals*	Rapid City, South Dakota	Summit Arena at The Monument	10,000	2021	2024	Shon King
West Texas Desert Hawks*	Odessa, Texas	Ector County Coliseum	5,131	2019	2024	Chris Siegfried

*-Team folded or deactivated during season

**-Planned Team did not play at home arena during season, Georgia was later turned into a traveling team until it folded

== Players ==
Players reported to training camp April 4, 2024. Each team carried 35-men rosters into training camp, while final roster cuts will take place on April 20, 2024, with regular season rosters set at 25 players. Originally, the league used ironman rules, where most players must play both offense and defense, as originally used by the Arena Football League from 1987 to 2007, but cancelled the rule after week 4 and allowed free substitution.

=== Partnerships ===
==== American 7s Football League (A7FL) ====
On January 16, 2024, the AFL announced a partnership with American 7s Football League (A7FL) for player development, as players can transfer between leagues, with the A7FL functioning as its de facto minor league. As part of the partnership, both leagues will collectively align on marketing efforts that "will elevate the visibility of leagues athletes".

==== USA Football ====
In November 2023, the league announced a multi-year partnership with USA Football naming the AFL as an "official national team development & scouting partner", with the AFL helping USA Football recruiting players who want to represent the United States in international competition.

== Standings ==
On June 12, 2024, alongside the postseason announcement, the Arena Football League also outlined the seeding procedures for this season:

1. Winning percentage
2. Head-to-head record
3. Head-to-head points scored
4. Average Points Scored per game played

The final standings for the 2024 season are as follows:

Team	W	L	PCT	PF	PA
^{(1)}Billings Outlaws	7	1	.875	374	232
^{(2)}Albany Firebirds	7	2	.778	417	349
^{(3)}Salina Liberty	6	2	.750	294	202
^{(4)}Orlando Predators	5	2	.714	314	260
^{(5)}Southwest Kansas Storm	4	5	.444	310	324
^{(6)}Nashville Kats	3	4	.429	320	294
Wichita Regulators	2	6	.250	210	375
Washington Wolfpack	2	7	.222	267	372

Legend
^{(z)}	clinched indicated seed (and home-field advantage if Seed 1)
clinched first-round bye
clinched playoff berth

The following teams achieved these results before their removal from the league, not including points scored:

Team	W	L	PCT	Date removed
Oregon Blackbears	3	1	.750	May 28, 2024
Louisiana VooDoo	1	1	.500	May 14, 2024
Iowa Rampage	1	1	.500	May 2, 2024
West Texas Desert Hawks	4	5	.444	June 18, 2024
Minnesota Myth	1	2	.333	May 13, 2024
Philadelphia Soul	0	2	.000	May 9, 2024
Georgia Force	0	2	.000	May 9, 2024 (Note: The Georgia Force folded minutes before the Philadelphia Soul suspended operations.)
Rapid City Marshals	0	3	.000	May 24, 2024

== Season schedule ==
=== Regular season ===
==== Week 1 ====
Date	Away team	Result		Home team	Arena	Attendance	Broadcast	Notes
April 27	Orlando Predators	59	62	Albany Firebirds	MVP Arena	4,784	Vyre.tv	OT
April 27	Minnesota Myth	12	47	Nashville Kats	Nashville Municipal Auditorium	5,704	Gray Television	
April 27	Philadelphia Soul	18	53	Louisiana VooDoo	Blackham Coliseum	2,400	Gray Television	The Dallas Falcons of the American Arena League (AAL2) filled in for the Philadelphia Soul bearing the team jerseys, as Soul head coach Patrick Pimmel and almost the entire Soul roster abruptly resigned prior to leaving for Louisiana.
April 27	Iowa Rampage	58	28	Rapid City Marshals	Summit Arena at the Monument		Arenafootball.live Gray Television	
April 27	Wichita Regulators	26	66	Billings Outlaws	First Interstate Arena	2,119	Arenafootball.live Gray Television	
April 27	Washington Wolfpack	40	47	Oregon Blackbears	Oregon State Fairgrounds Pavilion		Arenafootball.live	
April 28	Southwest Kansas Storm	40	43	Salina Liberty	Tony's Pizza Events Center	3,600	Vyre.tv	
April 28	Georgia Force	28	51	West Texas Desert Hawks	Ector County Coliseum		Vyre.tv	

==== Week 2 ====
Date	Away team	Result		Home team	Arena	Attendance	Broadcast	Notes
May 2	Nashville Kats	41	51	Albany Firebirds	MVP Arena	2,412	Vyre.tv	
May 4	Iowa Rampage	18	34	Southwest Kansas Storm	United Wireless Arena	1,359	Vyre.tv	This was the Rampage's only game following their announcement to discontinue operations.
May 4	Georgia Force	24	63	Oregon Blackbears	Oregon State Fairgrounds Pavilion		KYKN	
May 5	Billings Outlaws	49	12	Washington Wolfpack	Angel of the Winds Arena	1,400	AFL LIVE	
May 5	West Texas Desert Hawks	30	14	Orlando Predators	Kia Center		Vyre.tv	
May 5	Philadelphia Soul	12	47	Minnesota Myth	Target Center		Vyre.tv	
May 6	Salina Liberty	PPD		Wichita Regulators	Hartman Arena		Gray Television	Postponed to June 15 due to severe weather in the Wichita vicinity.

Because of multiple problems before this week, some schedule changes took place, including the awards of bye weeks to the Louisiana VooDoo and the Rapid City Marshals.

==== Week 3 ====
Date	Away team	Result		Home team	Arena	Attendance	Broadcast	Notes
May 11	Billings Outlaws	2	0	Rapid City Marshals	Summit Arena at the Monument			The Marshals abruptly called a flash strike against the league office immediately prior to the start of this game, refusing to play and forcing their arena to issue refunds to ticket holders who had already arrived to see the contest.
May 11	Orlando Predators	2	0	Louisiana VooDoo	Blackham Coliseum			The VooDoo suspended operations before this game. The Predators were awarded a forfeit win later in the season.
May 12	Salina Liberty	50	30	Nashville Kats	Nashville Municipal Auditorium		WPRT-FM	The Oregon Blackbears cancelled their Week 3 matchup against Salina when it appeared they would have been a short-notice replacement for the West Texas Desert Hawks due to a court injunction against the latter, but the injunction was lifted and the Desert Hawks were allowed to play. Salina instead filled the place of the Philadelphia Soul in their scheduled game against Nashville.
May 12	West Texas Desert Hawks	34	21	Washington Wolfpack	Angel of the Winds Arena			This game marked history for the Arena Football League as Washington Wolfpack kicker Melissa Strother completed her first extra point in the season, making her the first female player to score a point in the league.
May 12	Southwest Kansas Storm	42	44	Wichita Regulators	Hartman Arena		Gray Television	
May 13	Albany Firebirds	2	0	Minnesota Myth	NA	–	YouTube	Originally scheduled for May 9 at Target Center but was moved to May 13 at MVP Arena due to a Minnesota Timberwolves playoff contest. The game was ultimately cancelled when the Myth could "not make the trip."

==== Week 4 ====
Date	Away team	Result		Home team	Arena	Attendance	Broadcast
May 16	Orlando Predators	50	39	West Texas Desert Hawks	Ector County Coliseum		Vyre, Gray Television
May 18	Wichita Regulators	26	58	Nashville Kats	F&M Bank Arena; Clarksville, Tennessee	4,649	YouTube
May 18	Oregon Blackbears	27	25	Washington Wolfpack	Angel of the Winds Arena		Vyre
May 18	Salina Liberty	35	54	Billings Outlaws	MetraPark First Interstate Arena	1,400	Vyre
May 19	Southwest Kansas Storm	15	66	Albany Firebirds	MVP Arena	2,756	YouTube

==== Week 5 ====
Date	Away team	Result		Home team	Arena	Attendance	Broadcast
May 23	Rapid City Marshals	20	76	Washington Wolfpack	Angel of the Winds Arena		Vyre
May 24	West Texas Desert Hawks	46	47	Albany Firebirds	MVP Arena		Vyre, YouTube
May 25	Wichita Regulators	25	54	Salina Liberty	Tony's Pizza Events Center		Gray Television
May 25	Nashville Kats	62	69	Orlando Predators	Kia Center	2,500	Vyre

The Southwest Kansas Storm were originally scheduled to play the Billings Outlaws this week; on May 21, the Oregon Blackbears were assigned as the away team for the match, but Oregon declined the assignment "due to unforeseen circumstances" on May 23. The Storm instead hosted the Cedar Rapids River Kings, an independent team that had severed from American Indoor Football two weeks prior; the Storm won that game, 68–12.

==== Week 6 ====
Date	Away team	Result		Home team	Arena	Attendance	Broadcast
June 1	Albany Firebirds	32	25	Nashville Kats	Nashville Municipal Auditorium	3,963	YouTube
June 1	Billings Outlaws	56	49	West Texas Desert Hawks	Ector County Coliseum		YouTube, Gray Television
June 2	Salina Liberty	31	34	Southwest Kansas Storm	United Wireless Arena	1,040	YouTube

==== Week 7 ====
Date	Away team	Result		Home team	Arena	Attendance	Broadcast	Notes
June 8	Albany Firebirds	73	70	West Texas Desert Hawks	Ector County Coliseum		YouTube, Gray Television	OT
June 8	Washington Wolfpack	7	42	Salina Liberty	Tony's Pizza Events Center		YouTube	
June 8	Nashville Kats	57	54	Billings Outlaws	MetraPark First Interstate Arena	1,450	YouTube	
June 9	Wichita Regulators	12	35	Southwest Kansas Storm	United Wireless Arena	1,125	YouTube	

==== Week 8 ====
Date	Away team	Result		Home team	Arena	Attendance	Broadcast
June 15	Orlando Predators	57	49	Albany Firebirds	MVP Arena	5,029	YouTube
June 15	Salina Liberty	37	12	Wichita Regulators	Hartman Arena		YouTube
June 15	Washington Wolfpack	18	58	Billings Outlaws	MetraPark First Interstate Arena		YouTube
June 15	Southwest Kansas Storm	61	65	West Texas Desert Hawks	Ector County Coliseum		YouTube

==== Week 9 ====
Date	Away team	Result		Home team	Arena	Attendance	Broadcast
June 22	Albany Firebirds	35	36	Billings Outlaws	MetraPark First Interstate Arena	1,786	YouTube
June 22	Washington Wolfpack	47	46	Southwest Kansas Storm	United Wireless Arena		YouTube, Gray Television
June 22	Orlando Predators	63	18	Wichita Regulators	Hartman Arena		YouTube

Following the suspension of operations of the West Texas Desert Hawks, the Cedar Rapids River Kings once again stepped in to fill in as Salina Liberty's opponent this week. As the River Kings game is non-league, West Texas is considered to have forfeited their game (and thus technically completed their season) and Salina was awarded the original game 2–0. Likewise, the league's YouTube channel did not carry the game, which was instead streamed by Eagle Communications. Salina defeated Cedar Rapids 85–18.

==== Week 10 ====
Date	Away team	Result		Home team	Arena	Broadcast
June 29	Wichita Regulators	48	21	Washington Wolfpack	Angel of the Winds Arena	YouTube

On June 26, the league decided to cancel the majority of games this week and declare the remaining six teams in the playoffs. Only the Regulators-Wolfpack game remained as scheduled, as both teams were already eliminated from the playoffs by that point.

=== Postseason ===
Round 1
July 6 – Tony's Pizza Events Center
5 Southwest Kansas Storm	35
3 Salina Liberty	41
July 5 – Kia Center
6 Nashville Kats	62
4 Orlando Predators	32

Semi-finals
July 13 – MVP Arena
3 Salina Liberty	59
2 Albany Firebirds	80
July 13 – MetraPark First Interstate Arena
6 Nashville Kats	32
1 Billings Outlaws	35

Final
July 19 – American Dream Center
2 Albany Firebirds	41
1 Billings Outlaws	46

To allow for easier travel for all involved teams, Nashville was scheduled to play Orlando and Southwest Kansas was scheduled to play Salina in the first round.

==== Round 1 ====
Round One: Nashville Kats 62, Orlando Predators 32–Game summary

Quarter	1	2	3	4	Total
Nashville Kats	21	15	13	13	62
Orlando Predators	7	13	0	12	32

at Kia Center, Orlando, Florida

- Date: July 5, 2024
- Game time: 7:00 p.m. EDT
- TV announcers (CBS Sports Network): Ari Wolfe, Bret Munsey
- Recap
Round One: Southwest Kansas Storm 41, Salina Liberty 35–Game summary

Quarter	1	2	3	4	Total
Southwest Kansas Storm	12	6	9	8	35
Salina Liberty	7	24	0	10	41

at Tony's Pizza Events Center, Salina, Kansas

- Date: July 6, 2024
- Game time: 3:00 p.m. CDT
- TV announcers (CBS Sports Network): Ari Wolfe, Bret Munsey
- Recap

==== Semifinal ====
Semifinal: Salina Liberty vs Albany Firebirds–Game summary

Quarter	1	2	3	4	Total
Salina Liberty	13	29	5	12	59
Albany Firebirds	15	29	15	21	80

at MVP Arena, Albany, New York

- Date: July 13, 2024
- Game time: 2:30 p.m. EDT
- Game attendance: 4,562
- TV announcers (CBS Sports Network): Ari Wolfe, Bret Munsey
- Recap
Semifinal: Nashville Kats vs. Billings Outlaws–Game summary

Quarter	1	2	3	4	Total
Nashville Kats	0	14	2	16	32
Billings Outlaws	0	14	12	9	35

at MetraPark First Interstate Arena, Billings, Montana

- Date: July 13, 2024
- Game time: 8:00 p.m. MDT
- Game attendance: 2,013
- TV announcers (CBS Sports Network): Ari Wolfe, Bret Munsey

==== ArenaBowl XXXIII ====
Arena Bowl XXXIII–Game summary

Quarter	1	2	3	4	Total
Albany Firebirds	0	13	16	12	41
Billings Outlaws	3	14	16	13	46

at American Dream Center, East Rutherford, New Jersey

- Date: July 19, 2024
- Game time: 5:30 p.m. EDT
- Referee: Dave Cutaia
- TV announcers (CBS Sports Network): Ari Wolfe, Bret Munsey
- Recap

Game information

First quarter

- BIL – Bailey Giffen 20-yard field goal, 1:04. Outlaws 3–0. Drive: 11 plays, 39 yards, 9:10.

Second quarter

- ALB – Trevon Shorts 1-yard run (Dylan Moghaddam kick), 10:19. Firebirds 7–3. Drive: 9 plays, 44 yards, 6:08.
- BIL – Duane Brown 9-yard pass from Isaac Harker (Bailey Giffen kick), 3:35. Outlaws 10–7. Drive: 8 plays, 33 yards, 6:34.
- BIL – Duane Brown 13-yard pass from Isaac Harker (Bailey Giffen kick), 0:50. Outlaws 17–7. Drive: 3 plays, 13 yards, 1:51.
- ALB – Darien Townsend 7-yard pass from Jake Medlock (two-point conversion failed), 0:03. Outlaws 17–13. Drive: 5 plays, 43 yards, 0:46.

Third quarter

- BIL – Duane Brown 36-yard pass from Isaac Harker (Bailey Giffin kick), 12:21. Outlaws 24–13. Drive: 3 plays, 36 yards, 2:19.
- BIL – Bailey Giffen deuce, 12:21. Outlaws 26–13.
- ALB – Trevon Shorts 1-yard run (two-point conversion failed), 8:33. Outlaws 26–19. Drive: 8 plays, 40 yards, 8:32.
- BIL – Hunter Swoboda 1-yard run (Bailey Giffen kick), 6:08. Outlaws 33–19. Drive: 3 plays, 6 yards, 2:41.
- ALB – Jake Molonich 1-yard run (Darius Prince pass from Jake Medlock, Darius Prince pass from Jake Medlock), 1:38. Outlaws 33–29. Drive: 7 plays, 48 yards, 4:49.

Fourth quarter

- BIL – Duane Brown 9-yard pass from Isaac Harker (kick failed), 14:55. Outlaws 39–29. Drive: 3 plays, 17 yards, 1:43.
- ALB – Jale Molonich 1-yard run (two-point conversion failed), 6:46. Outlaws 39–35. Drive: 4 plays, 40 yards, 1:44.
- BIL – Duane Brown 37-yard pass from Isaac Harker (Bailey Giffen kick), 4:23. Outlaws 46–35. Drive: 2 plays, 38 yards, 2:00.
- ALB – Darius Prince 2-yard pass from Jake Medlock (two-point conversion failed), 0:09. Outlaws 46–41. Drive: 5 plays, 10 yards, 0:18.

Top passers

- ALB – Jake Medlock – 19/32, 213 yards, 2 TD, INT
- BIL – Isaac Harker – 16/27, 184 yards, 5 TD

Top rushers

- ALB – Jake Medlock – 7 attempts, 27 yards
- BIL – Hunter Swoboda – 10 attempts, 17 yards, TD

Top receivers

- ALB – Darien Townsend – 5 receptions, 101 yards, TD
- BIL – Duane Brown – 9 receptions, 125 yards, 5 TD

== Awards ==
2024 AFL Award Winners
Coach of the Year	Cedric Walker	Billings Outlaws
Assistant Coach of the Year	Sherdrick Bonner	Billings Outlaws
League MVP	Isaac Harker	Billings Outlaws
Offensive Player of the Year	Darius Prince	Albany Firebirds
Defensive Player of the Year	Freddy McGee	Salina Liberty

== League finances ==
In a February 2023 interview with ArenaFan.com, Hutton mentioned that the league would have a salary cap of $700,000, but the league will allow additional salary spending for "franchise players". According to Force quarterback Justin Arth, players were promised a $1,000 per-game salary. While most teams were responsible to pay the full amount, teams that were brought in through the Champions Indoor Football merger were promised a 75% subsidy from the league to cover the increased salaries ($750 per player, per week), a subsidy that was never delivered.

In week 3, Washington and Rapid City both renegotiated their player contracts to a "competitive indoor football salary".

The higher salaries also reflected the expectation that most players other than quarterbacks would have been required to play both offense and defense, reimplementing the one-platoon system that the original AFL had used from its 1987 launch until 2007. As part of the reorganization, free substitution was restored prior to the Week 4 contests.

=== Business partnerships ===
On July 18, 2023, the AFL announced a partnership with HUMBL, as the "Official Technology Platform of the AFL", through the 2028 season. On February 28, 2024, the league signed "Official Partnership" deal with BSN Sports for official uniform and equipment.

== Media ==
On the AFL relaunch event Hutton declared that the league’s games "will be broadcast, streamed and will also be available in VR". In March the NFL announced that NFL Network will carry 30 games of the 2024 AFL season (games will also be streamed on NFL+). No games have yet aired on the network, which thus far has removed all future schedulings of AFL contests as of week 2. with a spokesman for the Albany Firebirds stating that the network had been "scared off by some of the smaller teams." Oregon Blackbears president Patrick Johnson, who had opposed the television deal and expressed relief that it had been cancelled, described the agreement as predatory, in that NFL Network would keep a $430,000 annual brokered programming fee and would not allow the league to sell any advertising during the games, instead collecting all the advertising revenue for themselves on top of the fee. NFL Network stated that the production company that would have produced the games never received any payment for them, and thus the network would not be carrying any games for the 2024 season. West Texas owner Zack Bugg stated that, contrary to NFL Network's accusation, he had personally paid the money to have one of the games televised and suspected Hutton may have embezzled the money.

The league announced on March 29 that much of the league's schedule will be carried on Gray Television owned-and-operated stations in each team's home market and in regional syndication. After NFL Network cancelled the agreement with the league, most of the planned games that were scheduled to be broadcast on the network were moved to VYRE streaming services, while other games were streamed via Arenafootball.live and the Albany Firebirds resorted to using their own team YouTube channel to stream its games. The Nashville Kats and Oregon Blackbears did not have any home games televised due to infrastructure issues at their home arenas for the first several weeks, with their games carried solely on radio via WPRT-FM and KYKN, respectively. Nashville would eventually begin carrying games on YouTube.

Prior to the 2024 playoffs, the league announced a cable and satellite television deal with CBS Sports Network to carry the entirety of the tournament. The same network had been the original league's television partner from 2013 to 2018.

In January 2024 the league launched an official podcast for the 2024 season available on YouTube, Spotify, and other platforms.

== Controversy ==
The return of the AFL was marked with multiple controversies throughout the first few weeks, with unpaid bills, players getting kicked out of hotels, replacement teams and players refusing to come out of the home locker room until they were paid. Those issues, stemming from misconduct by the league commissioner Lee Hutton III, caused five teams to suspend operations and cancelling the broadcast agreement with the NFL Network.

After cancelling a May 9 home game, the Minnesota Myth folded on May 13, with owner Diana Hutton accusing the league of attempting to sabotage the team in order to force her husband to resign, which he refused to do. Because league central operations were run through the Myth business entity, this caused a crisis with the remainder of the league; in a reported emergency meeting of the remaining teams on May 14, the league's owners, in cooperation with the holding company that holds the AFL's intellectual properties, voted to appoint Nashville Kats president Jeff Fisher as interim commissioner to salvage the remainder of the season. This is despite a league bylaw that was believed to have granted Hutton total immunity from ouster by league owners; the ouster was made with the full cooperation of G6 Sports Group (owners of the trademarks and connected to the original F1 group that had founded the revival), who had suggested Fisher for the position.

== Signees to outdoor professional leagues ==
The following players signed with NFL, UFL or CFL teams following their involvement with Arena Football League in 2024:

=== NFL ===
Player	Position	AFL team	NFL team	Ref.
Cory Curtis	QB	Desert Hawks	Seattle Seahawks	
Desmond Bland	C	Storm	New Orleans Saints	
Cade Brewer	TE	Kats	San Francisco 49ers	

=== UFL ===
Player	Position	AFL team	UFL team	Ref.
Jeremy Cox	RB	Storm	Arlington Renegades	

== See also ==
- 2024 American Indoor Football season
- 2024 Indoor Football League season
- 2024 National Arena League season
- 2024 The Arena League season
