= ArenaBowl XXXIII =

2024 Arena Football League championship game

Albany Firebirds	Billings Outlaws
41	46
	1	2	3	4	Total
ALB	0	13	16	12	41
BIL	3	14	16	13	46
- Date: July 19, 2024
- Arena: American Dream Meadowlands; East Rutherford, New Jersey
- Winning coach: Cedric Walker
- Losing coach: Damon Ware

TV in the United States
- Network: CBS Sports Network
- Announcers: Ari Wolfe, Bret Munsey and Brent Stover

ArenaBowl XXXIII was the championship game for the 2024 Arena Football League season. It took place at the American Dream Center, an ice rink located inside American Dream Meadowlands, a shopping mall and entertainment complex in East Rutherford, New Jersey, on July 19, 2024. The game featured the Albany Firebirds facing off against the Billings Outlaws who had faced each other earlier in the season in Billings winning 36–35. Billings won the Arenabowl 46–41.

== Venue ==
The site was originally selected as the Target Center, home of the Minnesota Myth. However, this was dropped when the Myth folded and Myth co-owner Lee Hutton was expelled from his post as league commissioner.

On June 27, 2024, the league announced a new venue for the game would be held at American Dream Center, an ice rink located inside American Dream Meadowlands, a large retail complex and entertainment facility located in East Rutherford, New Jersey, adjacent to the Meadowlands Sports Complex and not far from MetLife Stadium. The choice of a shopping mall for the event drew widespread attention, with Matt Reigle of Outkick describing it as "either the coolest thing I've ever seen or the saddest," a former AFL broadcaster writing for Barstool Sports praising it as an example of the league's reputation for being willing to try new things, and Karl Rasmussen of Sports Illustrated commenting that the lack of traditional angled seating or a press box had consequences for the CBS Sports Network television broadcast, which largely operated from a single high camera, giving unusually angled views of the action. CBS Sports Network commentator Ari Wolfe himself commented that the situation was "unlike anything we've ever seen."

== Teams ==
This was the second consecutive ArenaBowl appearance for Albany, who appeared in and won ArenaBowl XXXII, the last ArenaBowl of the previous Arena Football League as the Albany Empire in 2019; the Empire had also won two National Arena League titles in the interim in 2021 and 2022. This was Billings's first league championship appearance in its current incarnation and the fifth for the Billings Outlaws brand overall, the first since the 2010 United Bowl. The two teams were the first and second ranked teams in the AFL in the 2024 regular season. In the two teams' regular season matchup, the Outlaws, using rules the team had pushed to bring in from Champions Indoor Football as part of that league's merger with the AFL (and which Albany had themselves used to win a game under similar circumstances against the West Texas Desert Hawks four weeks prior), scored a touchdown, four-point conversion and a deuce (a kickoff through the Firebirds' uprights) in a five-second span to win their week 9 contest 36–35. Albany and Billings each advanced to the ArenaBowl by defeating the Salina Liberty and Nashville Kats, respectively, in the AFL playoffs (Billings having avenged its lone regular season loss against the Kats in said game).

== Game summary ==
Arena Bowl XXXIII–Game summary

Quarter	1	2	3	4	Total
Albany Firebirds	0	13	16	12	41
Billings Outlaws	3	14	16	13	46

at American Dream Center, East Rutherford, New Jersey

- Date: July 19, 2024
- Game time: 5:30 p.m. EDT
- Referee: Dave Cutaia
- TV announcers (CBS Sports Network): Ari Wolfe, Bret Munsey and Brent Stover
- Recap 1
  Recap 2

Game information

First quarter

- BIL – Bailey Giffen 20-yard field goal, 1:04. Outlaws 3–0. Drive: 11 plays, 39 yards, 9:10.

Second quarter

- ALB – Trevon Shorts 1-yard run (Dylan Moghaddam kick), 10:19. Firebirds 7–3. Drive: 9 plays, 44 yards, 6:08.
- BIL – Duane Brown 9-yard pass from Isaac Harker (Bailey Giffen kick), 3:35. Outlaws 10–7. Drive: 8 plays, 33 yards, 6:34.
- BIL – Duane Brown 13-yard pass from Isaac Harker (Bailey Giffen kick), 0:50. Outlaws 17–7. Drive: 3 plays, 13 yards, 1:51.
- ALB – Darien Townsend 7-yard pass from Jake Medlock (two-point conversion failed), 0:03. Outlaws 17–13. Drive: 5 plays, 43 yards, 0:46.

Third quarter

- BIL – Duane Brown 36-yard pass from Isaac Harker (Bailey Giffin kick), 12:21. Outlaws 24–13. Drive: 3 plays, 36 yards, 2:19.
- BIL – Bailey Giffen deuce, 12:21. Outlaws 26–13.
- ALB – Trevon Shorts 1-yard run (two-point conversion failed), 8:33. Outlaws 26–19. Drive: 8 plays, 40 yards, 8:32.
- BIL – Hunter Swoboda 1-yard run (Bailey Giffen kick), 6:08. Outlaws 33–19. Drive: 3 plays, 6 yards, 2:41.
- ALB – Jake Molonich 1-yard run (Darius Prince pass from Jake Medlock, Darius Prince pass from Jake Medlock), 1:38. Outlaws 33–29. Drive: 7 plays, 48 yards, 4:49.

Fourth quarter

- BIL – Duane Brown 9-yard pass from Isaac Harker (kick failed), 14:55. Outlaws 39–29. Drive: 3 plays, 17 yards, 1:43.
- ALB – Jale Molonich 1-yard run (two-point conversion failed), 6:46. Outlaws 39–35. Drive: 4 plays, 40 yards, 1:44.
- BIL – Duane Brown 37-yard pass from Isaac Harker (Bailey Giffen kick), 4:23. Outlaws 46–35. Drive: 2 plays, 38 yards, 2:00.
- ALB – Darius Prince 2-yard pass from Jake Medlock (two-point conversion failed), 0:09. Outlaws 46–41. Drive: 5 plays, 10 yards, 0:18.

Top passers

- ALB – Jake Medlock – 19/32, 213 yards, 2 TD, INT
- BIL – Isaac Harker – 16/27, 184 yards, 5 TD

Top rushers

- ALB – Jake Medlock – 7 attempts, 27 yards
- BIL – Hunter Swoboda – 10 attempts, 17 yards, TD

Top receivers

- ALB – Darien Townsend – 5 receptions, 101 yards, TD
- BIL – Duane Brown – 9 receptions, 125 yards, 5 TD
