= Blackham Coliseum =

Multipurpose arena in Lafayette, Louisiana

Coordinates: 30.210554°N 92.033122°W

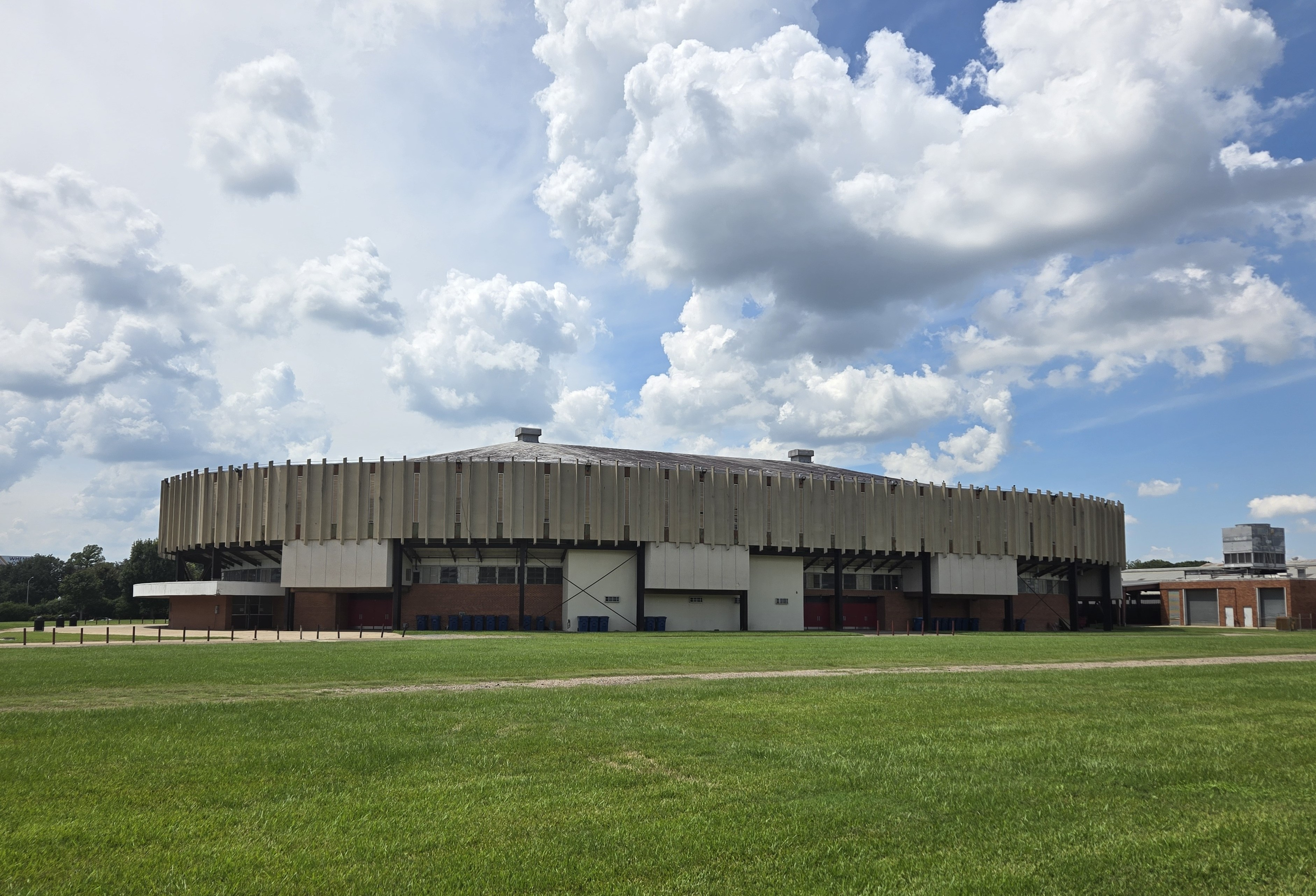
- Interactive map of Blackham Coliseum
- Location: 444 Cajundome Boulevard; Lafayette, Louisiana 70506
- Owner: University of Louisiana at Lafayette
- Operator: University of Louisiana at Lafayette
- Capacity: Official: 5,500; Concerts: 9,800
- Surface: Concrete

Construction
- Opened: 1950

Tenants
- Louisiana–Lafayette Ragin' Cajuns (NCAA) (1950–1985); Louisiana IceGators (SPHL) (2009–2010); Louisiana VooDoo (AFL) (2024)

Blackham Coliseum is a multipurpose arena in Lafayette, Louisiana. It was built on the University of Louisiana at Lafayette campus in 1949 as the home to the then-named SLI Bulldogs, now called the Louisiana Ragin' Cajuns men's basketball teams. The arena was named for Stafford Morgan Blackham, former dean of the Department of Animal Husbandry at SLI, and as such it was built to host livestock exhibitions as well as athletics (in a similar manner to the usage of LSU's Parker Coliseum). It replaced the 1,500-seat Earl K. Long Gymnasium as home to the athletics teams. It remained the home for the men's team until the Cajundome was completed in 1984. The women continue to play the majority of their games at Earl K. Long. Blackham hosted the Southland Conference men's basketball tournament in 1982.

In the 1960s, it became popular as a venue for pop concerts where acts like The Supremes, James Brown and Jackie Wilson. The Supremes played to soldout audiences on their "Symphony Tour 1965".

Today it is still in use, seating 5,500 for basketball and up to 9,800 for concerts. It also features 25,000 square feet (2,300 m^{2}) of space at the main arena, with two barns adding 46,500 square feet (4,300 m^{2}) of space. Altogether, the three buildings can also be used for trade shows, rodeos and conventions. In the fall of 2009, the revived Louisiana IceGators began play there as a member of the Southern Professional Hockey League.

In April 2009, the venue held its first heavy metal concert, the 2009 No Fear Music Tour featuring Lamb Of God, As I Lay Dying, Children of Bodom, God Forbid and Municipal Waste.

The venue serves as home to the Grammy-styled, annual Le Cajun Music Awards Festival held every August by the Cajun French Music Association, an association of Cajun music enthusiasts for the preservation of the Cajun music, language, heritage and culture.

== Gallery ==
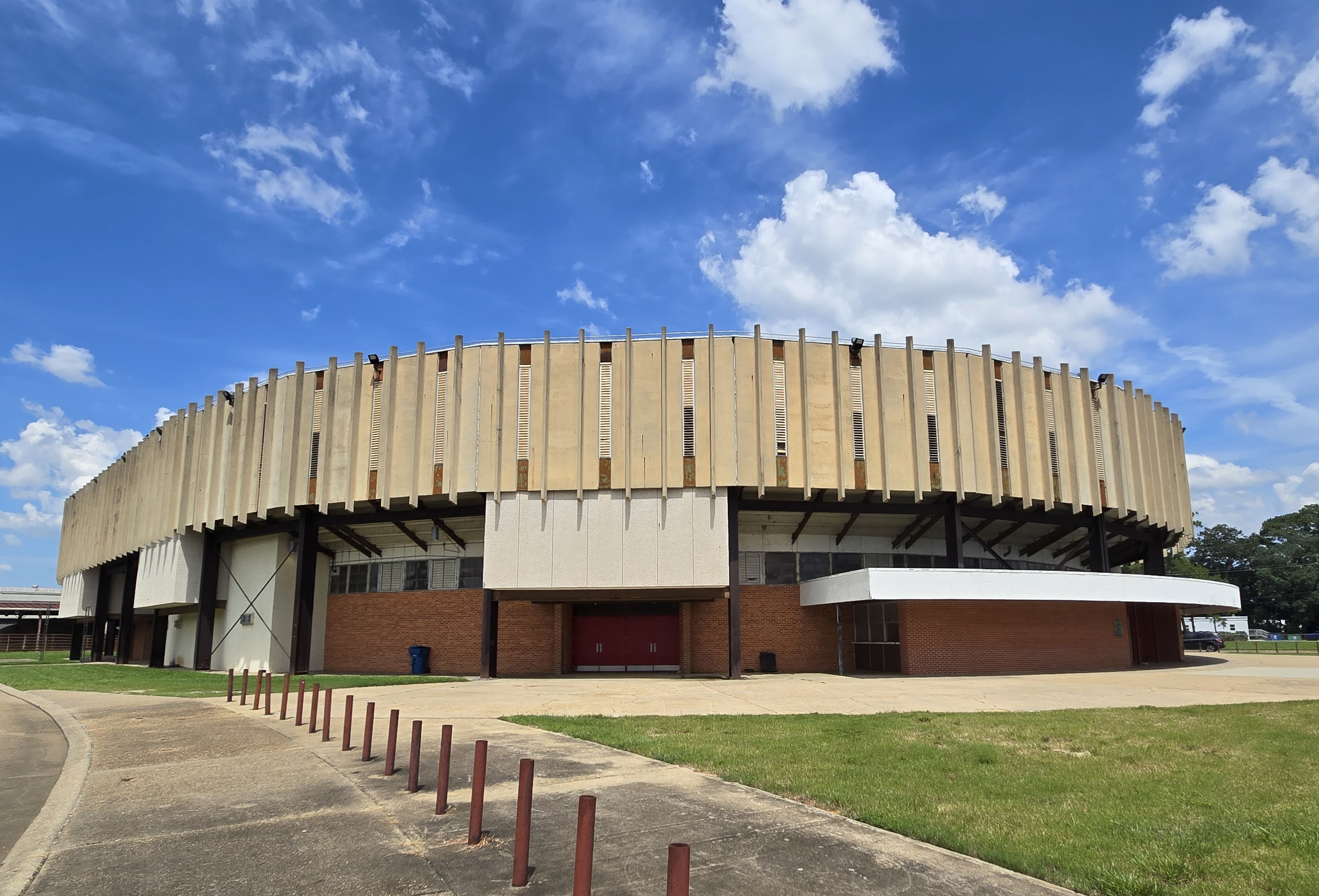
Blackham Coliseum Main Entrance

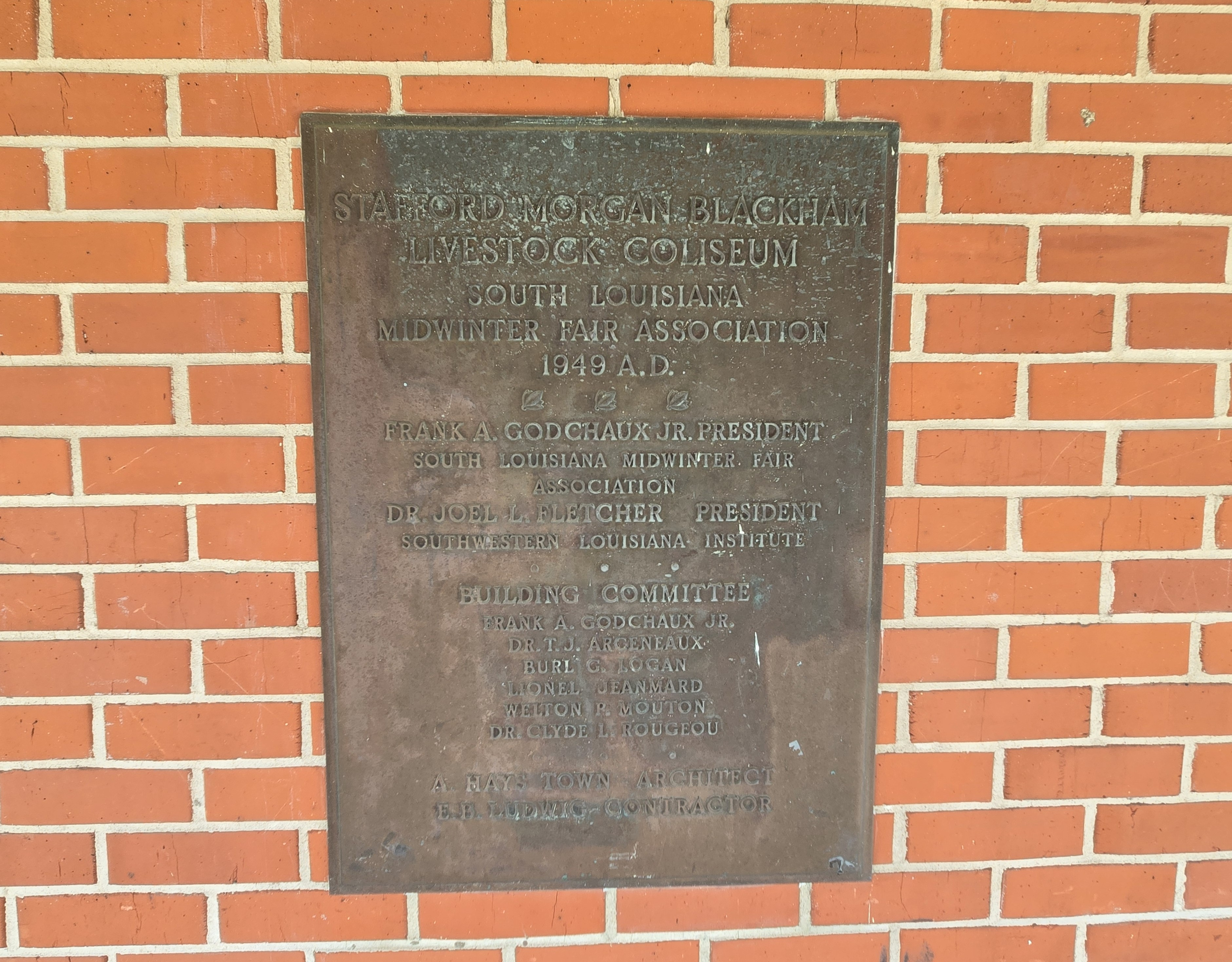
Blackham Coliseum Dedication Plaque

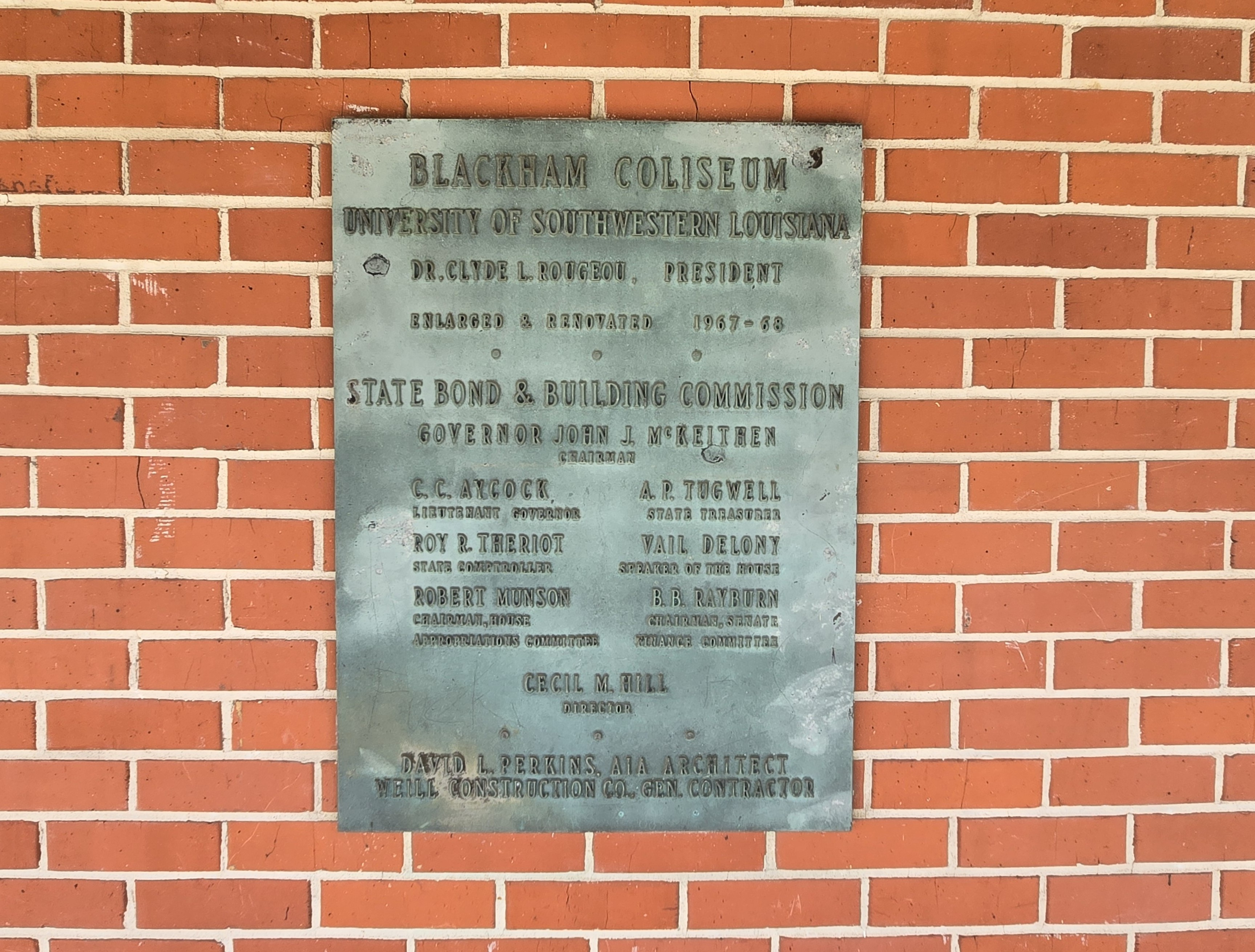
Blackham Coliseum Renovation Plaque

== See also ==
- List of convention centers in the United States
