= KYKN =

Radio station in Keizer, Oregon, U.S.

- Keizer, Oregon; United States
- Broadcast area: Salem, Oregon
- Frequency: 1430 kHz
- Branding: 1430 KYKN

Programming
- Format: Talk Radio
- Network: Townhall News
- Affiliations: Compass Media Networks; Premiere Networks; Salem Radio Network

Ownership
- Owner: Jeff Morgan, President - Willamette Broadcasting Co.

History
- First air date: 1951; 75 years ago
- Former call signs: KGAE (1951–1956); KGAY (1956–1986)

Technical information
- Licensing authority: FCC
- Facility ID: 72474
- Class: B
- Power: 5,000 watts
- Transmitter coordinates: 44°55′35.4″N 122°57′23.3″W

Links
- Public license information: Public file; LMS
- Webcast: Listen Live
- Website: kykn.com

KYKN (1430 AM) is a commercial radio station licensed to Keizer, Oregon, and serving the Salem area. It airs a talk radio format with conservative programming and is owned by the Willamette Broadcasting Company. Initially incorporated in 1991 by Michael Frith, its current owner-operator is Jeff Morgan. The studios are on Cherry Avenue NE in Keizer.

KYKN is powered at 5,000 watts non-directional. To protect other stations on 1430 AM from interference, at night it uses a directional antenna with a three-tower array. The transmitter is on Cordon Road SE at State Street in Four Corners, Oregon.

== Programming ==
Most of KYKN's programming is nationally syndicated talk shows with an hour of local talk and news at noon on weekdays.

Local hosts include Mike Allegre, Jake Atsma, Warren Franklin, Charlie McGuire, Hunter Newton, and Denise Quinn. National hosts include Glenn Beck, Larry Elder, Sebastian Gorka, Lee Habeeb, Hugh Hewitt, Charlie Kirk, Bill O'Reilly, Joe Pags, Dennis Prager, Todd Starnes, and Chris Stigall.

Weekend specialty shows focus on travel, law, technology, guns, car repair, and the outdoors. Weekend hosts include Kim Komando, Rudy Maxa, and Erick Erickson. Most hours begin with an update from Townhall News.

In autumn, sports programming includes local high school football. KYKN is also the Salem affiliate for the Seattle Mariners, as well as for football and basketball at the University of Oregon.

== History ==
=== KGAE ===
This station began broadcasting in 1951 as KGAE. It had 1,000 watts of power as a daytime-only station. The original call sign was KGAE and its city of license was Salem, Oregon. It was owned by a partnership known as Allen, Truhan, & Clark, with partner W. Gordon serving as president and general manager.

This partnership would be soon dissolved leading to a now-oft cited court case that went all the way to the Oregon Supreme Court. As a result, Allen took control of the stations in 1952 with the broadcast license transferred to a new company called KGAE, Inc. Allen remained president but Hal Davis took over the general manager duties.

=== KGAY ===
In 1956, the station's call sign was changed to KGAY and the name of the license holding company was changed to KGAY, Inc., with W. Gordon Allen still in control. That same year, KGAY was authorized to increase the power of its broadcast signal to 5,000 watts, although it was still restricted to daytime operation.

After a succession of station managers through the 1950s, W. Gordon Allen resumed the general manager duties in 1959. By this time Allen, who owned a two-thirds interest in flagship KGAY, had also acquired a 70% interest in KGAL in Lebanon, Oregon, and a 48% interest in KMAT in Winnsboro, Louisiana, as part of his W. Gordon Allen Stations group.

After nearly a decade of ownership, W. Gordon Allen and KGAY, Inc., agreed to sell the station to a company known as Radio Wonderful Willametteland, Inc. The deal was consummated on July 1, 1961. Glen M. Stadler took the title of general manager while Robert Bruce was named station manager. Stadler owned a one-third interest in KGAY, as did his partners Harry Rubenstein and Alex Dreier. The three men also owned equal shares in KGAL in Lebanon, Oregon. Stadler was the sole owner of KEED and KEED-FM in the area of Springfield-Eugene, Oregon. By the end of the 1960s, KGAY, Inc. was wholly owned by Glen Stadler and his wife, Helen N. Stadler, who also served as vice president of the company.

In 1968, the Stadlers announced their intention to retire from radio to "enter the academic field" and so they put KGAY up for sale. They contracted to sell the station to Capitol Equities, Inc., for a reported cash price of $175,000. The deal closed on August 15, 1968, and Donald H. Cushing took over as president of the company with Leslie J. Manning as general manager. By 1970, the station was airing a pure country & western music format. They would maintain this focus on country music throughout the 1970s and 1980s.

=== KYKN ===
In April 1985, the station applied to the Federal Communications Commission (FCC) to make major changes to its licensed operation. It wanted to add nighttime service with 5,000 watts of power, add a directional antenna array to the new nighttime signal, and change the legal community of license from Salem to nearby Keizer, Oregon. The FCC granted a new construction permit to authorize these changes on September 18, 1985, and, after one extension, the station received its license to cover these changes on January 16, 1987.

While these changes were underway, the station was assigned the KYKN call sign by the FCC on May 15, 1986. The station slogan was "Kickin Country". The station remained a country music format until it switched to news/talk in the spring of 1991. After 37 years of being a country station and Oregon's first full time country station, DJ Tim O'Brian (Tim Hay) signed off the country music format with "The Last Cowboy Song" by Ed Bruce on Sunday, May 5, 1991, at midnight. The station signed on at 6:00 am Monday, broadcasting CNN Headline News.

In April 1991, Capitol Equities Corporation reached an agreement to sell KYKN to Willamette Broadcasting Company, Inc. The deal was approved by the FCC on August 1, 1991, and the transaction was consummated on September 18, 1991.

=== Former hosts ===
Notable former hosts include Bill Post, who suspended his talk show in 2014 due to a competitive political race.

== See also ==
- List of radio stations in Oregon
