= Minnesota Myth =

American indoor football team

- Current season
Logo

General information
- Founded: 2023
- Folded: 2024
- Headquartered: Minneapolis, Minnesota at Target Center
- Colors: Orange, Black & Silver
- MNMyth.com

Personnel
- Owners: Diana Hutton (majority); Arena Football Management, LLC (minority)
- Head coach: Vacant

Team history
- Minnesota Myth (2024)

Home fields
- Target Center (2024)

League / conference affiliations
- Arena Football League (2024)

The Minnesota Myth (stylized as the Minnesota MYTH) were a professional indoor football team based in Minneapolis, Minnesota. The Myth played their home games at the Target Center. They were announced as one of the inaugural teams for the revived Arena Football League (AFL), playing its lone season in 2024.

The Myth were, in the league's structure, effectively the flagship franchise, running much of the league's operations through the team under the auspices of commissioner Lee Hutton, whose wife Diana was listed as the Myth's owner. This structure was later found to have violated the Huttons' agreements with the financial backers of the league, leading to the team's dissolution and Hutton's firing partway through its first season.

== History ==
The Myth were only the second official Minnesota-based team to play in the Arena Football League, the first since the Minnesota Fighting Pike who played in 1996.

=== Birth ===
Initial Logo (2023)

Four years after the AFL folded for the second time, it was announced on February 1, 2023, that the league intended on relaunching in 2024. On July 18, the 16 intended market cities were announced, including St. Paul, Minnesota.

On November 14, 2023, a press release announced that the team would be officially called the Minnesota Myth. The ownership group is led by Mexican-American attorney Diana Hutton, making her the first Latina majority team owner in league history; Hutton is the wife and law firm partner of Commissioner Lee Hutton, who himself had played college football at the University of Minnesota. Hutton had effectively structured the league so that it operated through the Myth's business operation, under license from G6 Sports Group; G6 president Anthony Rossi noted that Hutton had not paid the required licensing fees. Chairman Chris Chetty noted that Hutton's structuring of the league through a shell company tied to the Myth violated his contract with AFL trademark holder G6 Sports Group, a fireable offense.

Their head coach was former University of Minnesota and former Canadian Football League quarterback Rickey Foggie, who played for the Minnesota Fighting Pike in their only season in 1996 and for several others teams for the next eight seasons before becoming a coach. On January 30, 2024, the Myth announced that they will play at the Target Center in Minneapolis.

=== Closure of the franchise ===
On May 10, 2024, reports indicated that Rickey Foggie resigned as Myth head coach after only two games. Foggie confirmed the reports through his X account, along with the resignation of his special teams coach. On May 13, 2024, in an email from owner Diana Hutton, the Myth became the fourth team to suspend operations blaming it on "negative publicity" and the owners for "sabotage" in order to force her husband Lee Hutton to resign as commissioner. Lee Hutton was fired from his position the next day, replaced by Jeff Fisher. The team folded that same day.

The AFL's successor, Arena Football One, would eventually return to Minneapolis with the relocation of the Minnesota Monsters in October 2026.
