= Billings Outlaws (AF1) =

American indoor football team

- Current season
Logo

General information
- Founded: 2021
- Folded: 2026
- Headquartered: Billings, Montana
- Colors: Black, dark blue, silver, white
- outlawsfootball.com

Personnel
- Owner: Steven Titus
- General manager: TBA
- Head coach: TBA

Team history
- Billings Outlaws (2022–2025); Outlaws Arena Football Team (2025–present)

Home fields
- MetraPark First Interstate Arena (2022–2025)

League / conference affiliations
- Champions Indoor Football (2022–2023); Arena Football League (2024); Arena Football One (2025–future); West Division (2025–present)

Championships
- League championships: 1; 2024

Playoff appearances (3)
- CIF: 2022, 2023; AFL: 2024

The Outlaws Arena Football Team, historically known as the Billings Outlaws, were a professional indoor football team based in Billings, Montana, that compete in Arena Football One (AF1). The Outlaws played their home games at MetraPark First Interstate Arena until 2025. They were founded in 2022 as members of Champions Indoor Football. In 2024, they joined the revived Arena Football League and won ArenaBowl XXXIII. In 2025, they became inaugural members of the newly-formed AF1.

== History ==
Original Logo used from 2022 through 2023

The Outlaws will be the third indoor football team to be based in Billings following the original Billings Outlaws (2000–2010) and the Billings Wolves (2015–2016).

=== Champions Indoor Football (2022–2023) ===
On April 30, 2021, Keith Russ and Tel Koen, owners of fellow Champions Indoor Football (CIF) team the Wyoming Mustangs, announced they would bring an expansion CIF team to Billings for the 2022 season. A name-the-team contest was held, with the Outlaws being named the winner on July 22. Despite using the original Outlaws' name, logo, and colors, the current Outlaws are considered to be a new franchise with no other connection to the previous Outlaws, but continues to market itself as a continuation.

In June 2022, it was announced Steven Titus, a Gillette, Wyoming, attorney purchased the Outlaws and Wyoming Mustangs. On August 29, 2023, the Outlaws were announced to become members of the third incarnation of the Arena Football League. Titus named the Mustangs' head coach, Cedric Walker, as the new head coach of the Outlaws.

=== Arena Football League (2024) ===
Billings Outlaws logo (2024–2025)

In 2024, the CIF merged with the latest incarnation of the Arena Football League along with remaining members Rapid City Marshals, Salina Liberty and Southwest Kansas Storm while the Omaha Beef, Sioux City Bandits and Topeka Tropics opted for the National Arena League and the Gillette Mustangs folding. The league faced massive turmoil and owner Steven Titus led the charge to oust league commissioner Lee Hutton III as the league was cut in half during the season with teams either folding or being removed from the schedule. Despite all of the turmoil, the Outlaws played on and made the playoffs as the #1 seed in the revamped system. The Outlaws would make it to ArenaBowl XXXIII, which was played at American Dream Mall in East Rutherford, New Jersey, and face the Albany Firebirds. The Outlaws won the championship 46–41 over the Firebirds giving the Outlaws their first championship of any kind since the original Outlaws won their last title in 2010.

=== Arena Football One (2025–present) ===
On September 4, 2024, the Outlaws announced they were leaving the collapsed AFL and helping to form the new Arena Football One league, with team owner Steven Titus serving as league chairman. They will play in the West Division along with the Oregon Lightning and Washington Wolfpack (Potential opponents the Arizona Bandits went dormant for the season).

The Outlaws signed a substantial portion of the Corpus Christi Tritons' roster on May 1, 2025, including star Darius Prince, following allegations of impropriety from the Tritons ownership. Titus acknowledged on May 4 amid a four-game losing streak that the team was encountering multiple financial difficulties, including low attendance, loss of corporate sponsors, little to no government support, and increasing expenses that put the team's future in jeopardy. Titus reiterated these concerns when reached by the Billings Gazette later that week, stating that it no longer made financial sense to continue playing in Billings and that the team had a "50–50" chance of returning in Billings with him as owner.

On May 25, 2025, the Outlaws dropped the city name from the team name further fueling speculation of the franchise moving out of the city. This was largely disregarded in the local press, who as late as June 15 still referred to the team as the "Billings Outlaws." The Outlaws finished the season on a three-game winning streak, but this would be insufficient to reach the playoffs; the team was eliminated from playoff contention on the final play of the league's 2025 regular season when the Salina Liberty kicked a go-ahead field goal to clinch the final slot.

The Outlaws released Walker from his positions on August 2, 2025; Titus remarked that no decision had yet been made about the future of the franchise other than that. As of November 2025, the Outlaws had made no player transactions, the only remaining team not to have begun signing players or coaches; league executive Jerry Kurz dismissed concerns about the team, stating that he had full trust in Titus and that the team was "on track" but that the league would not be making any announcements about relocations until an arena agreement was in place, noting the problems that occurred in 2024 with the AFL. On November 11, 2025, the Outlaws team announced on their Facebook page that they were going dormant for 2026 as well as plans to relocate, yet selling the team identity. As of 2026, Steven Titus is no longer identified as AF1 chairman.

== Season-by-season results ==
League champions	Conference champions	Division champions	Playoff berth	League leader

Season	League	Conference	Division	Regular season				Postseason results
Season	League	Conference	Division	Finish	Wins	Losses	Ties	Postseason results
2022	CIF			4th	7	3	0	Won Quarterfinal (Wyoming Mustangs) 49–40; Lost Semifinal (Salina Liberty) 14–26
2023	CIF			4th	6	4	0	Won Quarterfinal (Sioux City Bandits) 39–31; Lost Semifinal (Omaha Beef) 6–42
2024	AFL			1st	7	1	0	Won Semi-Final (Nashville Kats) 35–32; Won Arena Bowl XXXIII (Albany Firebirds) 46–41
Totals					20	8	0	All-time regular season record
Totals					4	2	—	All-time postseason record
Totals					24	10	0	All-time regular season and postseason record

== Notable players and coaches ==
Players

- Dean Faithfull
- Dwayne Hollis
- Darius Prince

Coaches

- Randy Hippeard – offensive coordinator
