= Salina Liberty =

American indoor football team

Logo

General information
- Founded: 2015
- Headquartered: Tony’s Pizza Events Center in Salina, Kansas
- Colors: Navy, blue, red, silver, white
- Mascot: Sideline Sam
- www.salinaliberty.com

Personnel
- Owners: Precision Sports, LLC; Roy Lawrence; Dan and Linda Mendicina; Tom Perez; Josh Perez; Jimmy and Robyne Sponder; Dan Kieborz and Jennifer Main
- General manager: Mike McCoy
- Head coach: Heron O'Neal

Team history
- Salina Liberty (2016–present)

Home fields
- Tony’s Pizza Events Center (2016–present)

League / conference affiliations
- Champions Indoor Football (2016–2023); Northern Division (2016); North Conference (2017–2019); Arena Football League (2024); Arena Football One (2025); Central Division (2025); National Arena League (2026-)

Championships
- League championships: 1: 2022
- Conference championships: 1: 2019

Playoff appearances (7)
- 2018, 2019, 2021, 2022, 2023, 2024, 2025

The Salina Liberty are a professional indoor football team based in Salina, Kansas. They began play in 2016 as members of the Champions Indoor Football (CIF) and played in the Arena Football League in 2024. In 2025, they played in Arena Football One (AF1). In 2026, the team will move to the National Arena League. The team plays their home games at the Tony’s Pizza Events Center.

== History ==
Team logo from 2018-2023

Indoor football in Salina started in 2012 as the Salina Bombers, an expansion franchise for the Champions Professional Indoor Football League (CPIFL), were announced for the 2013 season. The Bombers then joined Champions Indoor Football (CIF) due to a merger between the CPIFL and the Lone Star Football League for 2015. However, during their first season in the CIF, the Bombers’ membership was suspended after the organization failed to comply with league bylaws and guidelines by a specified deadline, pending further investigation. The Bombers would cease operations later that month. In July 2015, the CIF announced it had replaced the Bombers with a new expansion team in Salina called the Salina Liberty.

The Liberty began play in the CIF in 2016, finishing last in the Northern division and failing to qualify for the playoffs. In 2017, the Liberty received their first win on the road against Bloomington Edge 47-34 after promoting offensive coordinator Mike Bonner to head coach. The team finished 1-4 under Bonner.

General Manager Ricky Bertz decided to go in another direction after the 2017 season. After hiring Heron O’Neal, the Liberty finished first in the CIF's North Conference regular season in 2018 and 2019. They won the conference playoff championship in 2019 and played in the Champions Bowl for the league title but lost to the Duke City Gladiators 29–35.

Logo used in the AFL in 2024.

On September 25, 2023, the Liberty were implicitly announced to be joining the Arena Football League after the AFL announced it would be absorbing CIF's remaining franchises. Then nearly one year later on September 4, 2024, the Liberty announced their move to the new Arena Football One following the collapse of the AFL. They played in the league's new Central Division along with the Corpus Christi Tritons and Southwest Kansas Storm with the Wichita Regulators going dormant for 2025.

At a media conference held September 19, 2025, it was announced the Liberty were moving to the National Arena League in 2026, part of a series of moves by the league to compact its footprint to the midwest.

== Season-by-season results ==
League champions	Conference champions	Division champions	Playoff berth	League leader

Season	League	Conference	Division	Regular season				Postseason results
Season	League	Conference	Division	Finish	Wins	Losses	Ties	Postseason results
2016	CIF		Northern	6th	2	10	0	
2017	CIF	North		7th	1	11	0	
2018	CIF	North		1st	9	3	0	Won Conference Semifinal (Bismarck) 81–51; Lost Conference Championship (Sioux City) 39–45
2019	CIF	North		1st	8	4	0	Won Conference Championship (Omaha) 44–42; Lost Champions Bowl (Duke City) 29–35
2020	CIF	North		Season cancelled due to COVID-19 pandemic				
2021	CIF			1st	9	1	0	Won Semifinal (Dodge City) 55–31; Lost Champions Bowl (Omaha) 39–40
2022	CIF			2nd	7	3	0	Won Semifinal (Billings) 26–14; Won Champions Bowl (Omaha) 38–34
2023	CIF			2nd	8	2	0	Won Semifinal (Gillette) 37–30; Lost Champions Bowl (Omaha) 30–50
2024	AFL			3rd	6	2	0	Won Round One Semifinal (Dodge City) 41–35; Lost Semifinal (Albany) 59-80
2025	AF1			4th	6	5	0	Lost Round One Semifinal (Albany) 44-75
57	41	0	All-time regular season record (2016–2025)					
7	6	—	All-time postseason record (2016–2024)					
64	47	0	All-time regular season and postseason record (2016–2025)					

== Notable players ==
See Category:Salina Liberty players
