= Southwest Kansas Storm =

American indoor football team

- Current season
Logo

General information
- Founded: 2021
- Headquartered: United Wireless Arena in Dodge City, Kansas
- Colors: Teal, purple, lime green, white
- SWKStormFootball.com

Personnel
- General manager: Logan Hernandez
- Head coach: Gary Thomas

Team history
- Southwest Kansas Storm (2022–present)

Home fields
- United Wireless Arena (2022–present)

League / conference affiliations
- Champions Indoor Football (2022–2023); Arena Football League (2024); Arena Football One (2025); Central Division (2025); National Arena League (2026-)

Championships
- League championships: 1; 2026

Playoff appearances (0)
- 2022-2026

The Southwest Kansas Storm is a professional indoor football team based in Dodge City, Kansas. Members of Champions Indoor Football (CIF) from 2022 to 2023, they were announced as members of the revived Arena Football League (AFL) for the 2024 season. In 2025, the franchise became a charter member of the newly-formed Arena Football One (AF1). In 2026, the Storm will move to the National Arena League.

== History ==
Original CIF Logo (2021–2023)

Dodge City, Kansas had previously had an indoor football team in the Dodge City Law, which played through 2017 in Champions Indoor Football (CIF) before returning in 2021 as a replacement team for the Oklahoma Flying Aces, which had dropped out due to "unforeseen workman's compensation insurance issues." The Southwest Kansas Storm were announced as a CIF expansion team on September 30, 2021, with the United Wireless Arena being named their home venue.

The initial coaching staff featured Mark Timberlake at head coach, Brandon Venson at offensive coordinator, Marquis George at defensive coordinator and Jamar Seard as an assistant. Laura Tawater was also announced as general manager. Seven games into the season, Venson was promoted to head coach. They finished the regular season with a record of 5–5 and lost 27–21 in the opening round of the playoffs to the Omaha Beef.

Valerie Heston became the team's general manager for the 2023 season. Venson continued as their head coach as the Storm went 3–7 and reached the playoffs as the sixth seed, losing in the first round to the Gillette Mustangs by a score of 40–35.

After the 2023 season, it was announced that Venson would be replaced by Gary Thomas, a former coach at Dodge City Community College, as head coach of the Storm. On October 5, 2023, it was announced that the Storm would join the revived Arena Football League (AFL) for its 2024 season along with the remaining CIF teams.

On September 4, 2024, the Storm jumped from the ill-fated AFL to the newly created Arena Football One.

On September 19, 2025, the Storm held a press conference to announce their move to the National Arena League. League rival Salina Liberty announced its move to the NAL earlier that day. Both will be able to reestablish rivalries with the Omaha Beef, Sioux City Bandits and Amarillo Warbirds.

== Notable players ==
- Montell Cozart
- Jalen Morton
