= 2016 Chicago Eagles season =

- Owner: Brian Brundage
- General manager: Tim Arvanitis; Matt Scearce
- Head coach: Tim Arvanitis
- Home stadium: UIC Pavilion; 525 South Racine Ave. Chicago, Illinois 60607

Results
- Record: 3–9
- Division place: 5th
- Playoffs: Did not qualify

The 2016 Chicago Eagles season was the team's first season and first as a member of Champions Indoor Football (CIF). The Eagles were one of 12 teams in the CIF for the 2016 season, they played in the 6-team Northern Division.

The Eagles played their home games at the UIC Pavilion in Chicago, Illinois, under the direction of head coach Tim Arvanitis.

== Schedule ==
Key: Win Loss Bye

=== Regular season ===
Week	Day	Date	Kickoff	Opponent	Results		Location	Attendance
Week	Day	Date	Kickoff	Opponent	Score	Record	Location	Attendance
1	BYE							
2	Sunday	March 6	7:00pm	at Sioux City Bandits	L 39–41	0–1	Tyson Events Center	2,856
3	Saturday	March 12	7:00pm	Salina Liberty	L 38–44 OT	0–2	UIC Pavilion	
4	Friday	March 18	7:00pm	Wichita Force	L 45–54	0–3	UIC Pavilion	2,325
5	Saturday	March 26	7:00pm	Bloomington Edge	W 40–37	1–3	UIC Pavilion	
6	BYE							
7	Saturday	April 9	7:00pm	Omaha Beef	W 49–48	2–3	UIC Pavilion	
8	Saturday	April 16	7:00pm	Sioux City Bandits	L 55–48	2–4	UIC Pavilion	
9	Friday	April 22	7:00pm	at Omaha Beef	L 38–50	2–5	Ralston Arena	3,127
10	Saturday	April 30	7:00pm	at Wichita Force	L 42–52	2–6	Intrust Bank Arena	4,053
11	Saturday	May 7	7:00pm	at Salina Liberty	W 51–50	3–6	Intrust Bank Arena	2,001
12	Friday	May 13	7:00pm	at Omaha Beef	L 42–43 (OT)	3–7	Ralston Arena	3,279
13	Saturday	May 21	7:00pm	at Bloomington Edge	L 33–55	3–8	U.S. Cellular Coliseum	3,579
14	Saturday	May 28	7:00pm	Omaha Beef	L 29–42	3–9	UIC Pavilion	
15	BYE							

== Standings ==
Northern Division
	W	L	PCT	PF	PA
x-Wichita Force	10	2	.833	593	516
y-Bloomington Edge	7	5	.583	546	440
y-Sioux City Bandits	7	5	.583	499	434
Omaha Beef	7	5	.583	514	487
Chicago Eagles	3	9	.250	486	584
Salina Liberty	2	10	.167	413	575
Southern Division
	W	L	PCT	PF	PA
z-Texas Revolution	10	2	.833	814	625
y-Amarillo Venom	8	4	.667	642	611
y-Dodge City Law	8	4	.667	653	523
Duke City Gladiators	6	6	.500	568	573
San Angelo Bandits	2	10	.167	537	688
Mesquite Marshals	2	10	.167	479	688

z - clinched top overall seed
x - clinched division title
y - clinched playoff spot

== Roster ==
2016 Chicago Eagles roster
Quarterbacks: 10 Anthony Iannotti; Running backs: 5 Chris Perry; 22 Calvin Phillips; Wide receivers: -- Dave Gianesin; 8 Stacey Howard; 81 Rashaun Simonise	Offensive linemen: 52 Jordan Brown; 63 Jabari Buckley; 64 Alex Gonzales; -- Antwan Marshal; Defensive linemen: 87 Dyron Dye; 54 Bryan Glenn; 96 Ayoub Hamidah; 51 Jordan Miller	Linebackers: 23 Deonte Ball; 3 Jordan Boykin; 49 Leon Mackey; 7 Kevin Morris Sr.; 20 Alex Wahl; Defensive backs: 22 Roderick Cohn; 1 Anthony Hughes; 18 Chris Muhammed; Kickers: 5 David Winn	Injured reserve: 34 Terrence Freeman FB (IR); Transfer list: Currently vacant; Refuse to report: Currently vacant; Rookies in italics Roster updated April 12, 2016; 26 Active, 1 Inactive → More rosters
