= 2016 Wichita Force season =

- Head coach: Paco Martinez
- Home stadium: Intrust Bank Arena

Results
- Record: 10–2
- Division place: 1st
- Playoffs: Won Northern Division Championship (Edge) 52-51 Won Champions Bowl II (Venom) 48-45

The 2016 Wichita Force season is the franchise's 2nd season as a professional indoor football franchise and second as a member of Champions Indoor Football (CIF). One of nine teams in the CIF for the inaugural 2016 season, the Wichita Force is owned by Wichita Indoor Football LLC, led by managing partner Marv Fisher. The Force clinched their first division title with a 44–30 victory over the Sioux City Bandits.

== Schedule ==
=== Regular season ===
| Week | Day | Date | Kickoff | Opponent | Results | | Location | Attendance |
| Week | Day | Date | Kickoff | Opponent | Score | Record | Location | Attendance |
|---|---|---|---|---|---|---|---|---|
| 1 | BYE | | | | | | | |
| 2 | Saturday | March 5 | 7:00pm | at Salina Bombers | W 66–44 | 1–0 | Bicentennial Center | 2,542 |
| 3 | Saturday | March 12 | 7:05pm | Duke City Gladiators | W 59–28 | 2–0 | Intrust Bank Arena | 3,633 |
| 4 | Saturday | March 18 | 7:00pm | at Chicago Eagles | W 54–45 | 3–0 | UIC Pavilion | NA |
| 5 | BYE | | | | | | | |
| 6 | Friday | April 1 | 7:05pm | Bloomington Edge | W 51–48 | 4–0 | Intrust Bank Arena | 2,640 |
| 7 | Saturday | April 9 | 7:05pm | Texas Revolution | L 42–74 | 4–1 | Intrust Bank Arena | 2,876 |
| 8 | Saturday | April 16 | 7:00pm | at Omaha Beef | L 55–58 | 4–2 | Ralston Arena | 3,402 |
| 9 | Saturday | April 23 | 7:00pm | at Bloomington Edge | W 32–27 | 5–2 | U.S. Cellular Coliseum | 1,324 |
| 10 | Saturday | April 30 | 7:05pm | Chicago Eagles | W 52–42 | 6–2 | Intrust Bank Arena | 4,053 |
| 11 | BYE | | | | | | | |
| 12 | Saturday | May 14 | 7:00pm | at Sioux City Bandits | W 23–19 | 7–2 | Gateway Arena | 4,592 |
| 13 | Saturday | May 21 | 7:00pm | at Amarillo Venom | W 59–51 | 8–2 | Amarillo Civic Center | 3,275 |
| 14 | Saturday | May 28 | 7:05pm | Sioux City Bandits | W 44–30 | 9–2 | Intrust Bank Arena | 3,265 |
| 15 | Saturday | June 4 | 7:05pm | Omaha Beef | W 56–50 | 10–2 | Intrust Bank Arena | 3,354 |

=== Post-season ===
| Round | Day | Date | Kickoff | Opponent | Results | | Location | Attendance |
| Round | Day | Date | Kickoff | Opponent | Score | Record | Location | Attendance |
|---|---|---|---|---|---|---|---|---|
| Divisional Championship | Saturday | June 18 | 7:05 pm | Bloomington Edge | W 52-51 | 1-0 | Intrust Bank Arena | 3,144 |
| Champions Bowl II | Monday | June 27 | 7:00 pm | Amarillo Venom | W 48-45 | 2-0 | Intrust Bank Arena | 4,772 |

== CIF Standings ==
Northern Division
| | W | L | PCT | PF | PA |
|---|---|---|---|---|---|
| x-Wichita Force | 10 | 2 | .833 | 593 | 516 |
| y-Bloomington Edge | 7 | 5 | .583 | 546 | 440 |
| y-Sioux City Bandits | 7 | 5 | .583 | 499 | 434 |
| Omaha Beef | 7 | 5 | .583 | 514 | 487 |
| Chicago Eagles | 3 | 9 | .250 | 486 | 584 |
| Salina Liberty | 2 | 10 | .167 | 413 | 575 |
Southern Division
| | W | L | PCT | PF | PA |
| z-Texas Revolution | 10 | 2 | .833 | 814 | 625 |
| y-Amarillo Venom | 8 | 4 | .667 | 642 | 611 |
| y-Dodge City Law | 8 | 4 | .667 | 653 | 523 |
| Duke City Gladiators | 6 | 6 | .500 | 568 | 573 |
| San Angelo Bandits | 2 | 10 | .167 | 537 | 688 |
| Mesquite Marshals | 2 | 10 | .167 | 479 | 688 |

z - clinched top overall seed
x - clinched division title
y - clinched playoff spot

== Roster ==
2016 Wichita Force roster
| Quarterbacks: 8 Jeffrey Legree; 11 David Olson; Running back: 23 Julian Hayes; Wide receivers: 9 Clarence Anderson; 6 Rashad Daniels; 7 Benji Love; 10 Brett Soft; 2 Jabril Soloman | Offensive linemen: 76 Darren Marquez; 50 Darrius Moore; 88 Ken Van Heule; Defensive linemen: 92 Brandon Jenkins; 99 Matt Moss; 13 Chaquil Reed; 53 Brandon Russell | Linebackers: 1 Jason Catchings; Defensive backs: 4 Anthony Daniel; 24 Kendrick Harper; 43 Elbert Mack; 12 Dontr'a Matthews; 21 Evan Ray; 12 Kenneth Ridley; 5 Dorian Roberts; 22 Dominique Terrell; Kickers: 29 Connor Frazell | Injured Reserve: 3 Quentin Benning RB; 4 Kiaree Daniels DB; 51 Latavious Davis DL; 19 Ronald Davis WR; 2 Chris Hemphill DB; Exempt List: 11 Stephen Panasuk QB; Refuse to Report: currently vacant; Roster updated June 11, 2015; 21 Active, 0 Inactive → More rosters |
