= 2016 Sioux City Bandits season =

Iowa football season

- Owner: Bob Scott
- General manager: Bob Scott
- Head coach: Erv Strohbeen
- Home stadium: Tyson Events Center; 401 Gordon Drive; Sioux City, Iowa 51101

Results
- Record: 7-5
- Division place: 3rd
- League place: 6th
- Playoffs: Lost Round 1 (Edge) 65-45

The 2016 Sioux City Bandits season was the team's sixteenth as the Sioux City Bandits, seventeenth overall and second as a member of Champions Indoor Football (CIF). One of 12 teams in the CIF for the 2016 season, they played in the 6-team Northern Division.

The Bandits play their home games at the Tyson Events Center in Sioux City, Iowa, under the direction of head coach Erv Strohbeen. The team's offensive coordinator is Jarrod DeGeorgia, the defensive coordinator is John Zevenbergen, and the assistant coaches include Greg Stallman and Justin Hayes.

== Awards and honors ==
Each week of the regular season, the CIF names league-wide Players of the Week in offensive, defensive, and special teams categories. For Week 1, the CIF named cornerback Rahn Franklin as the Defensive Player of the Week. For Week 2, the CIF named cornerback Jon Smith as the Defensive Player of the Week. For Week 5, the CIF named defensive lineman Ben Pister as the Defensive Player of the Week. For Week 11, the CIF named wide receiver Frederick Bruno as the Special Teams Player of the Week. In Round 1 of the playoffs, running back Drew Prohaska was named the offensive player of the week when he broke Fred Jackson's single game rush yard record.

== Schedule ==
Key: Win Loss Bye

=== Regular season ===
| Week | Day | Date | Kickoff | Opponent | Results | | Location | Attendance |
| Week | Day | Date | Kickoff | Opponent | Score | Record | Location | Attendance |
|---|---|---|---|---|---|---|---|---|
| 1 | Saturday | February 27 | 7:05pm | Omaha Beef | W 43-38 | 1–0 | Tyson Events Center | 3,562 |
| 2 | Sunday | March 6 | 3:05pm | Chicago Eagles | W 41-39 | 2–0 | Tyson Events Center | 2,856 |
| 3 | Saturday | March 12 | 7:05pm | at Mesquite Marshals | L 26–27 | 2–1 | Mesquite Arena | 2,722 |
| 4 | Saturday | March 19 | 7:05pm | Bloomington Edge | L 41–45 | 2–2 | Tyson Events Center | 3,260 |
| 5 | Friday | March 25 | 7:05pm | at Omaha Beef | W 45–33 | 3–2 | Ralston Arena | 3,902 |
| 6 | Saturday | April 2 | 7:05pm | Salina Liberty | W 46–20 | 4–2 | Tyson Events Center | 3,423 |
| 7 | BYE | | | | | | | |
| 8 | Saturday | April 16 | 7:05pm | at Chicago Eagles | W 68–45 | 5–2 | UIC Pavilion | N/A |
| 9 | Saturday | April 23 | 7:05pm | at Salina Liberty | W 41-39 | 6–2 | Bicentennial Center | 2,025 |
| 10 | BYE | | | | | | | |
| 11 | Saturday | May 7 | 7:05pm | Bloomington Edge | W 61–33 | 7–2 | Tyson Events Center | 3,110 |
| 12 | Saturday | May 14 | 7:05pm | Wichita Force | L 19–23 | 7–3 | Tyson Events Center | 4,592 |
| 13 | BYE | | | | | | | |
| 14 | Saturday | May 28 | 7:05pm | at Wichita Force | L 30–44 | 7–4 | Intrust Bank Arena | 3,265 |
| 15 | Sunday | June 5 | 3:05pm | at Bloomington Edge | L 38–48 | 7–5 | U.S. Cellular Coliseum | 1,050 |

=== Post-season ===
| Round | Day | Date | Kickoff | Opponent | Results | | Location | Attendance |
| Round | Day | Date | Kickoff | Opponent | Score | Record | Location | Attendance |
|---|---|---|---|---|---|---|---|---|
| Round 1 | Saturday | June 11 | 7:05pm | at Bloomington Edge | L 45–65 | 7–6 | U.S. Cellular Coliseum | N/A |

== Roster ==
2016 Sioux City Bandits roster
| Quarterbacks: 4 A. J. Graham; 10 Chuck Wright; Running backs: 24 Johnny Bentley; 20 Drew Prohaska; Wide receivers: 2 Fredrick Bruno; 12 Zach Ely; 1 Trent Hicks; 80 Cole McDaniel; 8 Ricky Roberts, Jr. | Offensive linemen: 78 Darius Barnes; 55 Arthur Doakes; 64 Matt Rahn; Defensive linemen: 70 Devin Groenhagen; 96 Marcus Miles; 15 Matthew Mosley; 18 James Patterson; 7 Ben Pister | Linebackers: 6 Marlon Lobban; Defensive backs: 9 Denzel Adams; 3 Rahn Franklin; 11 Henry Livingston; 23 Jon Smith; 5 Cliff Stokes; Kickers: 68 Nick Hope; 14 Doug Lehman; 60 Max Martin | Injured Reserve: currently vacant; Transfer List: currently vacant; Refuse to Report: currently vacant; rookies in italics Roster updated April 19, 2016; 26 Active, 0 Inactive → More rosters |

== Standings ==
Northern Division
| | W | L | PCT | PF | PA |
|---|---|---|---|---|---|
| x-Wichita Force | 10 | 2 | .833 | 593 | 516 |
| y-Bloomington Edge | 7 | 5 | .583 | 546 | 440 |
| y-Sioux City Bandits | 7 | 5 | .583 | 499 | 434 |
| Omaha Beef | 7 | 5 | .583 | 514 | 487 |
| Chicago Eagles | 3 | 9 | .250 | 486 | 584 |
| Salina Liberty | 2 | 10 | .167 | 413 | 575 |
Southern Division
| | W | L | PCT | PF | PA |
| z-Texas Revolution | 10 | 2 | .833 | 814 | 625 |
| y-Amarillo Venom | 8 | 4 | .667 | 642 | 611 |
| y-Dodge City Law | 8 | 4 | .667 | 653 | 523 |
| Duke City Gladiators | 6 | 6 | .500 | 568 | 573 |
| San Angelo Bandits | 2 | 10 | .167 | 537 | 688 |
| Mesquite Marshals | 2 | 10 | .167 | 479 | 688 |

z - clinched top overall seed
x - clinched division title
y - clinched playoff spot

== Playoffs ==
Round 1
Southern Division
3 | Dodge City | 56
2 | Amarillo | 98
Northern Division
3 | Sioux City | 45
2 | Bloomington | 65

Division Championships
2 | Amarillo | 57
1 | Texas | 53
2 | Bloomington | 51
1 | Wichita | 52

Champions Bowl II
S2 | Amarillo | 45
N1 | Wichita | 48
