= Champions Bowl II =

Amarillo Venom	Wichita Force
(10-4)	(11-2)
45	48
Head coach: Julian Reese	Head coach: Paco Martinez
	1	2	3	4	Total
Amarillo	0	10	7	28	45
Wichita	7	13	7	21	48
- Date: June 27, 2016
- Stadium: INTRUST Bank Arena
- Location: Wichita, KS
- MVP: QB David Olson (WIC)
- Attendance: 4,772

United States TV coverage
- Network: Eversport

Champions Bowl II was the second title game of Champions Indoor Football (CIF). It was played on June 27, 2016.

Wichita Force defeated Amarillo Venom by a score of 48–45.

== Road to the Champions Bowl ==
The three teams (ordered by seeding) that made the postseason in the Northern Division were the Wichita Force, Bloomington Edge, and Sioux City Bandits. In the Southern Division, the playoff teams were the Texas Revolution, Amarillo Venom, and Dodge City Law. On Saturday, June 11, Bloomington (at home) defeated Sioux City, 65–45. That same night, Amarillo defeated visiting Dodge City, 98–56. This matched Amarillo against Texas and Bloomington against Wichita in their division championships. Wichita won 52–51 and Amarillo won 57–53, setting up a matchup for Monday, June 27 for the second Champions Bowl.

Northern Division
	W	L	PCT	PF	PA
x-Wichita Force	10	2	.833	593	516
y-Bloomington Edge	7	5	.583	546	440
y-Sioux City Bandits	7	5	.583	499	434
Omaha Beef	7	5	.583	514	487
Chicago Eagles	3	9	.250	486	584
Salina Liberty	2	10	.167	413	575
Southern Division
	W	L	PCT	PF	PA
z-Texas Revolution	10	2	.833	814	625
y-Amarillo Venom	8	4	.667	642	611
y-Dodge City Law	8	4	.667	653	523
Duke City Gladiators	6	6	.500	568	573
San Angelo Bandits	2	10	.167	537	688
Mesquite Marshals	2	10	.167	479	688

z - clinched top overall seed
x - clinched division title
y - clinched playoff spot

== Playoffs ==
Round 1
Southern Division
3	Dodge City	56
2	Amarillo	98
Northern Division
3	Sioux City	45
2	Bloomington	65

Division Championships
2	Amarillo	57
1	Texas	53
2	Bloomington	51
1	Wichita	52

Champions Bowl II
S2	Amarillo	45
N1	Wichita	48

=== Scoring Summary ===
Scoring summary

Quarter	Time	Drive			Team	Scoring information	Score	
Quarter	Time	Plays	Yards	TOP	Team	Scoring information	Amarillo Venom	Wichita Force
1	9:38	8	41	5:22	Wichita Force	Jarrel Kelley 16-yard touchdown reception from David Olson, Jordan Drake kick Good	0	7
2	14:54	6	45	4:18	Wichita Force	Julian Hayes 11-yard touchdown run, Jordan Drake kick Good	0	14
2	8:47	9	38	4:07	Amarillo Venom	18-yard field goal by Jacob Felton	3	14
2	6:10	5	14	2:37	Wichita Force	24-yard field goal by Jordan Drake	3	17
2	1:00	5	28	5:10	Amarillo Venom	Julian Walker 8-yard touchdown reception from Nate Davis, Jacob Felton kick Good	10	17
2	0:00	6	42	1:00	Wichita Force	17-yard field goal by Jordan Drake	10	20
3	11:00	6	36	4:00	Amarillo Venom	Nate Davis 4-yard touchdown run, Jacob Felton kick Good	17	20
3	8:05	6	43	2:55	Wichita Force	Jarrel Kelley 22-yard touchdown reception from David Olson, Jordan Drake kick Good	17	27
4	13:43	4	30	2:02	Amarillo Venom	Wyreaz Bradley 1-yard touchdown run, Jacob Felton kick Good	24	27
4	11:48	3	30	1:55	Wichita Force	Ronald Davis 9-yard touchdown reception from David Olson, Jordan Drake kick Good	24	34
4	11:13	1	30	0:35	Amarillo Venom	Greg Jones 30-yard touchdown reception from Nate Davis, Jacob Felton kick Good	31	34
4	9:29	3	17	1:44	Wichita Force	David Olson 4-yard touchdown run, Jordan Drake kick Good	31	41
4	4:35	7	42	4:54	Amarillo Venom	Greg Jones 13-yard touchdown reception from Nate Davis, Jacob Felton kick Good	38	41
4	0:49	6	44	3:46	Wichita Force	David Olson 4-yard touchdown run, Jordan Drake kick Good	38	48
4	0:23	5	30	0:26	Amarillo Venom	Wyreaz Bradley 5-yard touchdown reception from Nate Davis, Jacob Felton kick Good	45	48
"TOP" = time of possession. For other American football terms, see Glossary of American football.							Amarillo Venom	Wichita Force
