= Jordan Miller (defensive lineman, born 1988) =

American football player (born 1988)

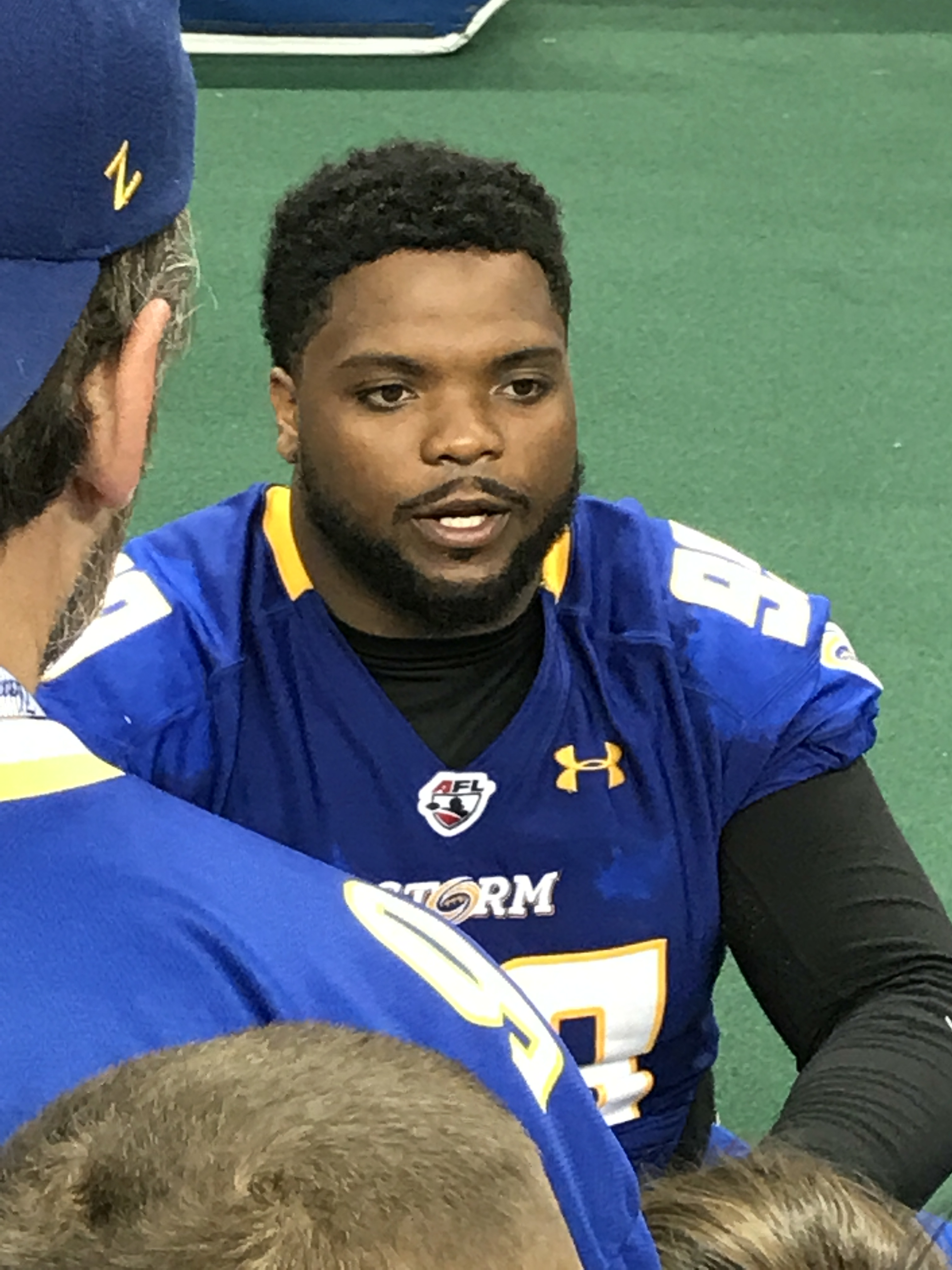
- Miller with the Tampa Bay Storm in 2017

No. 76, 67, 96, 91, 90, 51, 69, 99
- Position: Defensive tackle

Personal information
- Born: February 1, 1988 (age 38); Nashville, Tennessee, U.S.
- Listed height: 6 ft 2 in (1.88 m)
- Listed weight: 315 lb (143 kg)

Career information
- High school: Largo (MD)
- College: Southern
- NFL draft: 2011: undrafted

Career history
- Chicago Bears (2011); Green Bay Packers (2012); Kansas City Chiefs (2013)*; Jacksonville Jaguars (2013); New Orleans VooDoo (2015)*; Chicago Eagles (2016); Jacksonville Sharks (2016); Tampa Bay Storm (2017)
- * Offseason or practice squad member only

Career NFL statistics
- Total tackles: 2
- Stats at Pro Football Reference

Jordan Nicolas Miller (born February 1, 1988) is an American former professional football player who was a defensive tackle in the National Football League (NFL). He was signed by the Chicago Bears as an undrafted free agent in 2011. He played college football for the Southern Jaguars.

== Professional career ==
=== Jacksonville Jaguars ===
Miller was signed to the Jacksonville Jaguars' practice squad on October 1, 2013. He was promoted to the active roster on December 20.

He was waived/injured by the Jaguars on August 2, 2014, and later was placed on injured reserve. On August 9, he agreed to an injury settlement, releasing him from the team's roster.

=== New Orleans VooDoo ===
On April 10, 2015, Miller was assigned to the New Orleans VooDoo of the Arena Football League. On April 14, 2015, he was placed on reassignment. On April 16, 2015, he was placed on league suspension by the VooDoo.

=== Chicago Eagles ===
Miller signed with Chicago Eagles of Champions Indoor Football (CIF).

=== Jacksonville Sharks ===
On May 25, 2016, was assigned to the Jacksonville Sharks.

=== Tampa Bay Storm ===
Miller was assigned to the Tampa Bay Storm in January 2017. The Storm folded in December 2017.

Jordan Miller is currently retired and speaks to aspiring athletes in his free time.
