= Elbert Mack =

American football player (born 1986)

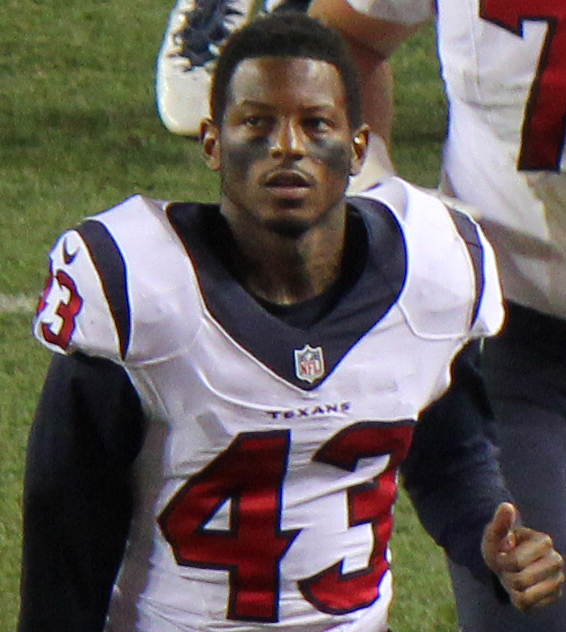
- Mack with the Houston Texans in 2014

No. 43, 33, 44
- Position: Cornerback

Personal information
- Born: July 14, 1986 (age 40); Wichita, Kansas, U.S.
- Listed height: 5 ft 11 in (1.80 m)
- Listed weight: 173 lb (78 kg)

Career information
- High school: Wichita North
- College: Troy
- NFL draft: 2008: undrafted

Career history
- Tampa Bay Buccaneers (2008−2011); New Orleans Saints (2012); Houston Texans (2013–2014); Wichita Force (2015–2016); Qingdao Clipper (2019)*
- * Offseason or practice squad member only

Awards and highlights
- CIF champion (2016); First-team All-Sun Belt (2007)

Career NFL statistics
- Total tackles: 117
- Pass deflections: 17
- Interceptions: 6
- Defensive touchdowns: 2
- Stats at Pro Football Reference

Elbert Mack (born July 14, 1986) is an American former professional football player who was a cornerback in the National Football League (NFL). He was signed as an undrafted free agent by the Tampa Bay Buccaneers. He played college football for the Troy Trojans. He was also a member of the New Orleans Saints, Houston Texans, Wichita Force, and Qingdao Clipper.

== College career ==
Mack finished his college football career at Troy after playing his first two years of college ball at Butler County Community College in Kansas. In his senior season at Troy, he led the nation in interceptions with 8, and was named a first-team All-Sun Belt selection.

== Professional career ==
=== Tampa Bay Buccaneers ===
He was signed as an undrafted free agent by the Tampa Bay Buccaneers following the 2008 NFL draft.

=== New Orleans Saints ===
On June 6, 2012, Mack was signed by the New Orleans Saints to a one-year contract. On December 9, 2012, during a game against the New York Giants, Mack intercepted a pass from Eli Manning early in the first quarter and returned in 73 yards for a touchdown, yet the Saints would lose the game 52-27.

=== Houston Texans ===
On July 25, 2013, Mack signed with the Houston Texans but was among final cuts. He was re-signed on October 16, 2013, following a season-ending injury to Danieal Manning. He was released again on October 28, 2014.

=== Wichita Force ===
Mack signed with the Wichita Force of Champions Indoor Football for the 2015 season, and returned to the team in 2016.

=== Qingdao Clipper ===
Mack was selected by the Qingdao Clipper in the fourth round of the 2017 CAFL draft.

== NFL career statistics ==
Legend
**Bold**	Career high

Year	Team	Games		Tackles					Interceptions					Fumbles			
Year	Team	GP	GS	Cmb	Solo	Ast	Sck	TFL	Int	Yds	TD	Lng	PD	FF	FR	Yds	TD
2008	TAM	15	0	15	13	2	0.0	**2**	0	0	0	0	1	0	0	0	0
2009	TAM	15	**3**	**29**	**26**	3	0.0	0	**3**	36	0	36	4	0	0	0	0
2010	TAM	12	0	16	14	2	0.0	0	0	0	0	0	0	0	0	0	0
2011	TAM	**16**	1	**29**	23	**6**	0.0	**2**	2	47	**1**	40	**6**	0	0	0	0
2012	NOR	7	2	14	9	5	0.0	0	1	**73**	**1**	**73**	**6**	0	0	0	0
2013	HOU	8	0	8	8	0	0.0	0	0	0	0	0	0	0	0	0	0
2014	HOU	8	0	6	6	0	0.0	0	0	0	0	0	0	0	0	0	0
		81	6	117	99	18	0.0	4	6	156	2	73	17	0	0	0	0
