= Jermaine Jackson (disambiguation) =

Jermaine Jackson (born 1954) is an American music artist.

Jermaine Jackson may also refer to:

- Jermaine La Jaune "Jay" Jackson, Jr., son of Jermaine Jackson and Hazel Joy Gordy, actor and music producer
- Jermaine Jackson (album), a 1984 album by Jermaine Jackson
- Jermaine Jackson (basketball) (born 1976), American professional basketball player
- Jermaine Jackson (hip hop producer), American hip hop producer
- Jermaine Jackson (wide receiver, born 1982), Canadian football wide receiver
- Jermaine Jackson (wide receiver, born 2000), American football wide receiver
