= Rashaun Simonise =

Canadian gridiron football player (born 1995)

No. 3
- Position: Wide receiver

Personal information
- Born: May 31, 1995 (age 31); Vancouver, British Columbia, Canada
- Listed height: 6 ft 4 in (1.93 m)
- Listed weight: 200 lb (91 kg)

Career information
- College: Calgary
- CFL draft: 2018: 2nd round, 12th overall pick

Career history
- 2016: Chicago Eagles
- 2016: Cincinnati Bengals*
- 2016–2017: Okanagan Sun
- 2018: Baltimore Brigade*
- 2018: Winnipeg Blue Bombers
- 2019: BC Lions
- 2020–2021: Jousters
- 2021: Montreal Alouettes
- 2022: Edmonton Elks
- * Offseason or practice squad member only

Career CFL statistics
- Receptions: 10
- Receiving yards: 182
- Receiving average: 18.2
- Stats at CFL.ca

Rashaun Simonise (born May 31, 1995) is a Canadian former professional football wide receiver. He was a member of the Chicago Eagles, Cincinnati Bengals, Okanagan Sun, Baltimore Brigade, Winnipeg Blue Bombers, BC Lions, Jousters, Montreal Alouettes, and Edmonton Elks.

== Early life ==
Rashaun Simonise (Sy-mo-ny-z) is a coach's son. He was born in Vancouver, British Columbia. He is the son of John Simonise (who is of Haitian descent). He spent time at quarterback, running back, wide receiver, tight end, cornerback, safety. He led the Vancouver College Irish (Christian Covington also attended) through the playoffs all the way to the BCHS championship, where they lost. Simonise led all receivers in playoffs with 238 yards in 3 games with 5 touchdowns. Simonise averaged 79 yards per game throughout the playoffs. On the defensive side of the ball, Rashaun made 27 solo tackles, and 3 interceptions through the playoffs. Rashaun had managed to play for 2 football teams throughout his high school career giving him back to back gamedays every weekend with games on Friday and Saturdays. Simonise also participated in basketball and track.

== College career ==
=== Freshman season ===
Rashaun Simonise came into the University of Calgary and started every game as a true freshman (18 years old). Rashaun hauled in 33 receptions and 481 yards with 1 touchdown on the offensive side of the ball, along with 111 kick return yards on the season which earned him the Canada West Rookie of the Year. Rashaun had contributed in the playoffs, catching 4 receptions for 112 yards and 2 touchdowns, with 18 returns for 163 yards and 2 touchdowns. His big play ability was shown off in front of a huge showcase in the Vanier Cup National Championship in Laval, Quebec where he brought in a 47-yard reception to change the momentum of the game in the Dino's favour but unfortunately had torn his meniscus just a play after the catch causing him to leave the game.

=== Sophomore season ===
Rashaun brought in 20 receptions for 391 yards and 1 touchdown during the regular season of his sophomore year. In the playoffs, he had 200 yards receiving on 11 receptions and 3 touchdowns in only 2 games. He also had 2 kick returns for 61 yards.

=== Junior season ===
Simonise had his break-out season in his junior year and tied for the lead in Canada in touchdowns with 11. He also had 1,013 yards and 65 catches in only 8 games. Simonise was averaging 134.9 yards per game with 22 yards per catch, giving him national attention. His most notable night came against University of Alberta, where he racked up 9 catches for 272 yards and 3 touchdowns. Simonise also had 4 receptions that were all longer than 30 yards but were called back because of penalties. Rashaun was named 1st team all Canadian and was the number one ranked receiver in Canada. He was ruled academically ineligible for the 2016 season. Six teams scouted Simonise including the Los Angeles Rams who used a supplementary pick in the 2015 NFL draft on Isaiah Battle.

== Professional career ==
Pre-draft measurables
Height	Weight	40-yard dash	20-yard shuttle	Three-cone drill	Vertical jump	Broad jump	Bench press
6 ft 4 3/4 in (1.95 m)	202 lb (92 kg)	4.76 s	4.21 s	7.06 s	35.5 in (0.90 m)	10 ft 5 3/4 in (3.19 m)	7 reps
All values from CFL Combine

=== Chicago Eagles ===
In 2016, Simonise played for the Chicago Eagles of Champions Indoor Football (CIF). He played in 5 games catching 11 passes for 105 yards with 2 touchdowns. He then had a workout with the Jacksonville Sharks of the Arena Football League (AFL), but was not signed because of his NFL pro day opportunity.

=== Cincinnati Bengals ===
Simonise signed with the Cincinnati Bengals after going undrafted in the 2016 NFL supplemental draft. He tested positive for a performance-enhancing drug during his time in Bengals' training camp. During his short time there, he had accumulated 64 yards on two catches during the preseason. On September 3, 2016, he was waived by the Bengals.

=== Okanagan Sun ===
Two weeks after being released by the Bengals Simonise signed with the Okanagan Sun of the Canadian Junior Football League (CJFL). He played two seasons with the Sun, 2016 and 2017, playing a total of seven games, catching 23 passes for 392 yards with three touchdowns.

=== Baltimore Brigade ===
On March 28, 2018, Simonise was assigned to the Baltimore Brigade of the AFL.

=== Winnipeg Blue Bombers ===
As a result of Simonise's positive performance-enhancing drug test with his time in Cincinnati, his CFL draft status was deferred from 2017 to 2018. Heading into the 2017 CFL draft, Simonise had been the No. 7 ranked prospect in September 2016 and then moved up to No. 4 in December 2016. He was the ninth ranked prospect entering the 2018 CFL draft. Simonise has been compared to a mixture of A. J. Green, Julio Jones and Randy Moss in stature. He was selected by the Winnipeg Blue Bombers in the second round (12th overall) in the 2018 CFL Draft. He dressed in all 18 regular season games for the Blue Bombers in 2018, recording four receptions for 122 yards. He lasted just one season with the team as he was part of training camp cuts the following year on June 8, 2019.

=== BC Lions ===
One day after being named to the practice roster in Winnipeg, Simonise signed with his hometown BC Lions of the CFL on June 9, 2019 to a one-year contract. He again played in all 18 regular season games and had five receptions for 53 yards.

=== The Spring League ===
Simonise was selected by the Jousters of The Spring League during its player selection draft on October 10, 2020.

=== Montreal Alouettes ===
On June 30, 2021, it was announced that Simonise had signed with the CFL's Montreal Alouettes. He played in 11 games, where he had one catch for seven yards. He was released on May 5, 2022.

=== Edmonton Elks ===
On May 18, 2022, Simonise signed with the Edmonton Elks of the CFL. He was released on October 21, 2022.
