= 2016 Omaha Beef season =

- Owner: Rich Tokheim; Jim Tokheim
- Head coach: Cory Ross
- Home stadium: Ralston Arena; 7300 Q Street; Ralston, Nebraska 68127

Results
- Record: 7-5
- Division place: 4th
- Playoffs: did not qualify

The 2016 Omaha Beef season was the team's seventeenth and second as a member of Champions Indoor Football (CIF). One of 12 teams in the CIF for the 2016 season, they played in the 6-team Northern Division.

The Beef played their home games at the Ralston Arena in Ralston, Nebraska, under the direction of head coach Cory Ross.

== Schedule ==
Key: Win Loss Bye

=== Preseason season ===
Week	Day	Date	Kickoff	Opponent	Results		Location	Attendance
Week	Day	Date	Kickoff	Opponent	Score	Record	Location	Attendance
1	Friday	February 19	7:00pm	Nebraska Danger	L 23-55	1–0	Ralston Arena	

=== Regular season ===
Week	Day	Date	Kickoff	Opponent	Results		Location	Attendance
Week	Day	Date	Kickoff	Opponent	Score	Record	Location	Attendance
1	Saturday	February 27	7:05pm	at Sioux City Bandits	L 38-43	0–1	Tyson Events Center	3,562
2	Sunday	March 6	7:00pm	At Bloomington Edge	W 34-31	1–1	U.S. Cellular Coliseum	1,441
3	BYE							
4	Saturday	March 19	7:00pm	at Salina Liberty	W 43–41	2–1	Bicentennial Center	2,325
5	Friday	March 25	7:00pm	Sioux City Bandits	L 33–45	2–2	Ralston Arena	3,902
6	BYE							
7	Saturday	April 9	7:00pm	at Chicago Eagles	L 48–49	2–3	UIC Pavilion	
8	Saturday	April 16	7:00pm	Wichita Force	W 58–55	3–3	Ralston Arena	3,402
9	Friday	April 22	7:00pm	Chicago Eagles	W 50-38	4–3	Ralston Arena	3,127
10	Saturday	April 30	7:00pm	Bloomington Edge	L 40–45	4–4	Ralston Arena	3,889
11	BYE							
12	Friday	May 13	7:00pm	Chicago Eagles	W 43–42 (OT)	5–4	Ralston Arena	3,279
13	Friday	May 20	7:00pm	Salina Liberty	W 35–18	6–4	Ralston Arena	3,579
14	Saturday	May 28	7:00pm	at Chicago Eagles	W 42–29	7–4	UIC Pavilion	
15	Saturday	June 6	7:00pm	at Wichita Force	L 50–56	7–5	Intrust Bank Arena	3,354

== Standings ==
Northern Division
	W	L	PCT	PF	PA
x-Wichita Force	10	2	.833	593	516
y-Bloomington Edge	7	5	.583	546	440
y-Sioux City Bandits	7	5	.583	499	434
Omaha Beef	7	5	.583	514	487
Chicago Eagles	3	9	.250	486	584
Salina Liberty	2	10	.167	413	575
Southern Division
	W	L	PCT	PF	PA
z-Texas Revolution	10	2	.833	814	625
y-Amarillo Venom	8	4	.667	642	611
y-Dodge City Law	8	4	.667	653	523
Duke City Gladiators	6	6	.500	568	573
San Angelo Bandits	2	10	.167	537	688
Mesquite Marshals	2	10	.167	479	688

z - clinched top overall seed
x - clinched division title
y - clinched playoff spot

== Roster ==
2016 Omaha Beef roster
Quarterbacks: 11 Josh Floyd; 10 Brandon Steed; Running backs: 3 Jeff Mack; Wide receivers: 4 Kayne Farquarson; 0 Jason Johnson; 13 Andre London; 2 Jeremiah Oates; 1 Jonathan Ray	Offensive linemen: 71 Clinton Barley; 50 Kyle McManus; 70 Tanner Paxton; -- Jeremy Walker; Defensive linemen: 7 Kewan Alfred; 5 Davon Bridges; 19 Sony Theodate	Linebackers: 6 Jesse Robertson Jr; Defensive backs: 15 A. J. Downs; 24 Mike Ford; 21 Theron Norman; 8 Stephan McCord; 12 Mark Sterling; 23 D'Andre Woodland; Kickers: 13 Todd Adolf	Injured Reserve Transfer List: currently vacant; Refuse to Report: currently vacant; rookies in italics Roster updated April 19, 2016; 26 Active, 0 Inactive → More rosters
