= Kerry Locklin =

American gridiron football player and coach (born 1959)

Kerry Lockin
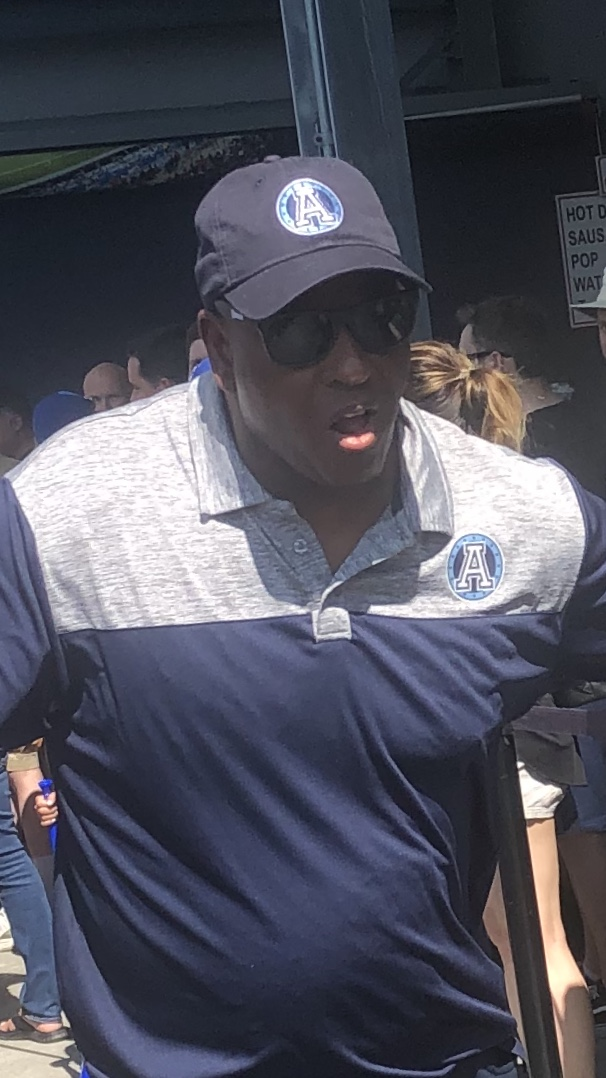
- Locklin with the Toronto Argonauts in 2019

No. 83, 89
- Position: Head coach

Personal information
- Born: September 9, 1959 (age 67); Las Cruces, New Mexico, U.S.
- Listed height: 6 ft 3 in (1.91 m)
- Listed weight: 230 lb (104 kg)

Career information
- High school: Rockdale (TX)
- College: New Mexico State (1978–1981)
- NFL draft: 1982: 6th round, 145th overall pick

Career history

Playing
- Los Angeles Rams (1982–1983); Arizona Wranglers (1984–1985); Denver Broncos (1987)

Coaching
- Western New Mexico (1988) Running backs coach; Utah (1989) Graduate assistant; Morehead State (1990–1993) Running backs coach; Shreveport Pirates (1994) Assistant; Eastern Michigan (1995–1999) Defensive line coach; Fresno State (2000–2008) Defensive line coach; New York Jets (2009) Defensive line coach; Florida Tuskers (2010) Defensive line coach; Fresno City College (2011) Defensive line coach; San Jose SaberCats (2012) Defensive line coach; Sacramento Mountain Lions (2012) Defensive line coach; New Mexico State (2014–2016) Defensive line coach; Toronto Argonauts (2017–2019) Defensive line coach; Spokane Shock (2020–2021) Defensive line coach; Gillette Mustangs (2022) Assistant head coach/Defensive line coach; Billings Outlaws (2023) Head coach

Awards and highlights
- As coach: Grey Cup champion (2017)

Head coaching record
- Regular season: 6–4 (.600)
- Postseason: 0–1 (.000)
- Career: 6–5 (.545)
- Stats at Pro Football Reference

Kerry Barth Locklin (born September 9, 1959) is an American football coach.

Locklin is the son of Billy Ray Locklin, a defensive end who played for the Aggies before spending ten years playing in the Canadian Football League (CFL) with the Montreal Alouettes from 1961 to 1964 and the Hamilton Tiger-Cats from 1965 to 1970. Locklin is the youngest of three brothers. Locklin graduated from Rockdale High School in Rockdale, Texas.

Like his older brother Ray, Locklin graduated from New Mexico State University and played for the Aggies. Locklin was the All-WAC tight end. Drafted in the sixth round of 1982 NFL draft by the Los Angeles Rams, he played with them for the 1982 season and with the Denver Broncos in 1987. In between, he played with Arizona in the United States Football League from 1984 to 1985.

Locklin coached at Western New Mexico (1988), Utah (1989), Morehead State (1990–1993), for the Shreveport Pirates in the Canadian Football League (1994), and then for Eastern Michigan (1995–1999) and then as the defensive line coach at Fresno State, before joining the Jets.

Locklin agreed to join New Mexico State as their DL Coach for the 2014 season. In 2022, it was announced that Locklin would take over the head coach job for the Billings Outlaws for the 2023 season. He was then hired by the Topeka Tropics of the National Arena League as head coach for the 2024 season. However, the Tropics were terminated by the league before the season began.

== Head coaching record ==
League	Team	Year	Regular season				Postseason			
League	Team	Year	Won	Lost	Win %	Finish	Won	Lost	Win %	Result
CIF	Billings Outlaws	2023	6	4	.600	4th in CIF	0	1	.000	Lost Semifinal (Omaha) 6–42
CIF total			6	4	.600		0	1	.000	
Career total			6	4	.600		0	1	.000	
