= Tyus Jackson =

American football player and coach (born 1983)

No. 7, 9, 56
- Position: Linebacker

Personal information
- Born: November 22, 1983 (age 42); Birmingham, Alabama, U.S.
- Listed height: 6 ft 3 in (1.91 m)
- Listed weight: 265 lb (120 kg)

Career information
- High school: Birmingham (AL) Woodlawn
- College: Memphis
- NFL draft: 2006: undrafted

Career history

Playing
- Fort Wayne Fusion (2007); Quad City Steamwheelers (2008–2009); Milwaukee Iron (2010); Kansas City Command (2011–2012); Milwaukee Mustangs (2012); Chicago Rush (2013); New Orleans VooDoo (2014); Salina Bombers (2015); Nebraska Danger (2016)

Coaching
- Kansas City Phantoms (2017) Defensive coordinator; Topeka Tropics (2022–2023) Head coach; Iowa Rampage (2024) Head coach

Awards and highlights
- First-team All-af2 (2009); Second-team All-af2 (2008)

Career AFL statistics
- Tackles: 84
- Sacks: 25.5
- Pass Breakups: 18
- Forced Fumbles: 5
- Fumble Recoveries: 8

Tyus Jackson (born November 22, 1983) is an American former football linebacker and coach. He lasted coached the Iowa Rampage of the Arena Football League.

== Early life ==
Jackson attended Woodlawn High School where he was a four-year starter on the football and basketball teams. He played fullback, tight end and middle linebacker and was named All-Metro and Super All-Metro during his prep career. He was also the starting point guard on the basketball team and helped lead his squad to a 6A State Championship.

== College career ==
=== Northeast Mississippi ===
He was ranked as a two-star prospect according to Rivals.com after two seasons at Northeast Mississippi Community College He lettered for two years at defensive end, playing for coach Bobby Hall. Selected to the Mississippi North All-State second team and was voted the defensive MVP in the Mississippi Junior College All-Star Game in 2002.

=== Memphis ===
In 2003, Jackson signed his letter of intent to play for Memphis, where he redshirted for the Tigers and began his Memphis career in 2004 when he had 13 tackles, 2.5 tackles for a loss, and one sack in 12 games, including a fumble recovery in the 2004 GMAC Bowl where Memphis lost to Bowling Green State University, 52–35.

In 2005, Jackson helped the Tigers to a 6–5 season and their second bowl win in three seasons when they beat the University of Akron in the 2005 Motor City Bowl. Jackson played in all 12 games for the Tigers in 2005 making 13 total tackles and one sack.

== Professional career ==
=== af2 ===
In 2007, Jackson played for the expansion Fort Wayne Fusion of af2, where he was coached by Eddie Brown.

In 2008, Jackson joined with the af2's Quad City Steamwheelers and earned Second Team All-af2 honors. The following year, he earned First Team All-af2 after leading the Steamwheelers with 12 quarterback hurries, 10 tackles for a loss, seven sacks and two safeties. He also added 41 total tackles, three forced fumbles and was named the Defensive Player of the Game in Week 1.

=== AFL ===
His performance from 2008–2009 in the af2 led to a contract in the Arena Football League (AFL) with the Milwaukee Iron for the 2010 season. In 2011, he signed to play with the Kansas City Command. Jackson was selected by the New Orleans VooDoo during the 2013 dispersal draft.

=== CIF ===
Jackson signed with the Salina Bombers of Champions Indoor Football (CIF) on February 25, 2015. Jackson signed with the Nebraska Danger of the Indoor Football League in March 2016.
