= Rapid City Marshals =

Professional indoor football team based in Rapid City, South Dakota

- Current season
Logo

General information
- Founded: 2021
- Folded: 2024
- Headquartered: Summit Arena at The Monument in Rapid City, South Dakota
- Colors: Black, silver, red
- www.marshalsfootball.com

Personnel
- Owners: Wes Johnson and Rebecca Chapman
- Head coach: Shon King

Team history
- Rapid City Marshals (2022–2024)

Home fields
- Summit Arena at The Monument (2022–2024)

League / conference affiliations
- Champions Indoor Football (2022–2023); Arena Football League (2024)

The Rapid City Marshals were a professional indoor football team based in Rapid City, South Dakota. The Marshals played their home games at the Summit Arena at The Monument. They began as an expansion team in Champions Indoor Football in 2022 and played in that league until 2023. They became members of the revived Arena Football League and began play in 2024 before folding midseason among labor strife tied to a wider league instability.

== History ==
Original Team Logo (2022)

The Marshals are the third indoor football team to be based in Rapid City following the Black Hills Red Dogs (2000–2005) and the Rapid City Flying Aces (2006).

On April 30, 2021, Keith Russ and Tel Koan, owners of fellow Champions Indoor Football (CIF) teams the Wyoming Mustangs and Billings Outlaws, announced launch of another CIF team to be based in Rapid City with their name, logo, and color scheme. The Marshals name was chosen to reflect the Rapid City area's passion for the Old West, as well as to provide a contrast to their CIF league-mates the Billings Outlaws and Sioux City Bandits.

On October 3, 2023, the Marshals announced their move to the revived Arena Football League and would play there starting in the 2024 season. The Marshals were one of several teams from CIF that merged with the AFL, with owner Wes Johnson conceding that he saw major warning signs with AFL Commissioner Lee Hutton making unattainable promises but had hoped that Hutton would deliver on half of what he promised.

On May 2, 2024, the Marshals indicated that the Arena Football League had not compensated the Marshals for promised expense reimbursements, as a condition of the Marshals and other CIF teams joining the league. Unlike the Iowa Rampage, which folded due to that lack of compensation, the Marshals remained committed to playing the season as long as possible in hopes of a resolution. The team offered new contracts rolling salaries back to CIF levels and granted six players their release when they declined in an effort to keep the team operational.

Immediately prior to the team's May 11 home game against the Billings Outlaws, the Marshals players went on strike, refusing to take the field for the game as fans and the Outlaws had already arrived for the game. Outlaws owner Steve Titus, while expressing solidarity with the Marshals' cause against the league central office, expressed outrage at the strike having happened so suddenly. The following week, the Marshals cancelled their newly scheduled home game with the Southwest Kansas Storm on May 18; after losing to the previously winless Washington Wolfpack on May 23, the Marshals folded the next day, stating that the labor issues the team faced were "insurmountable" despite the ownership's best efforts to keep the team together.
