= Doug Bland =

American entrepreneur and former athlete

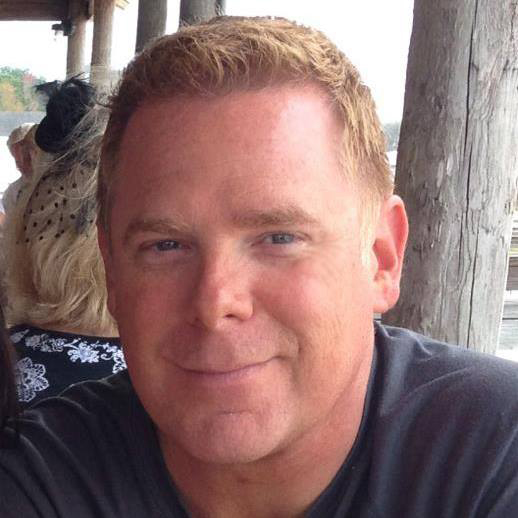
- Born: July 14, 1970 (age 56); Marseilles, Illinois, United States
- Education: Parkland College

Doug Bland is an American entrepreneur and former athlete.

== Career ==
After a brief time as a collegiate athlete, Doug Bland moved to Southern California, where he lived in Newport Beach. He began his business career in event marketing with Ritz Entertainment, producers of music festivals and sporting events. In 1996 Bland became marketing manager of the Roger Penske-owned California Speedway in Fontana, California. He stayed in that position until he was promoted to marketing director for the Penske/ISC-owned Homestead–Miami Speedway in 1998. Penske Motorsports was sold to International Speedway Corporation in 2000. Bland then formed Short Track Entertainment, Inc, a motorsports marketing company that promoted racing events and represented racing properties and race teams.

Bland purchased the UDTRA United Dirt Track Racing Association in 2002 and re-branded the property into the Xtreme Dirt Series. In 2003 he signed a TV rights deal with Speed Channel and signed a ten-year sponsorship agreement with NVE Pharmaceuticals (Stacker 2) for $13,000,000. At the time, this was the largest sponsorship deal in the history of dirt track racing.

In 2005 Bland sold Xtreme DirtCar Series to UMP, a company owned by NASCAR driver Ken Schrader. Shortly after the sale, Xtreme/UMP merged with the World of Outlaws Late Model Series. Later that year Bland purchased Springfield Raceway with partner Jerry Hoffman.

Bland ventured into the mixed martial arts industry with his XCF (Xtreme Cage Fighting) brand, He promoted 14 professional MMA events over the next three years.

In 2010 he started Bland Sports Inc., a sports marketing agency that represented athletes and sports properties including Kyle Busch Motorsports, Liquid Nitro Energy Drink, Maxim Racewear, Digital Qpons, and UFC fighter Michael Johnson.

Bland was named the managing partner of the Mesquite Arena in Mesquite, Texas in 2014. Six months later he became owner of the Dallas Marshals of the Champions Indoor Football League (CIF) team, who played their home games at the Mesquite Arena. Bland sold the Dallas Marshals in August, 2017 to Dallas businessman Bruce Badgett. The Dallas Marshals played the first six games of the 2017 season under Badgett's ownership, then folded.

Bland returned to his home state of Illinois to revitalize the Quad Cities Steamwheelers indoor football franchise that had been dormant since 2009. The team made the playoffs in 2018 with an 8–4 record, then went 7–7 in the 2019 season. In 2018 Bland moved the Steamwheelers to the Indoor Football League to compete on the biggest stage in the industry. In 2020 the Steamwheelers played one game (Win against Cedar Rapids) before the COVID-19 pandemic forced the IFL to cancel the season. In October 2020 Bland announced the Steamwheelers were forced to file dormancy with the IFL due to the state of Illinois COVID-19 regulations for indoor mass gatherings.

In 2022 The Steamwheelers made their return to the IFL (Indoor Football League) after a two-season hiatus due to the COVID-19 pandemic. Doug Bland and his franchise won the Franchise of the Year Award for the 2022 season and the team won the Eastern Conference Championship where they faced the North Arizona Wranglers for the IFL National Championship game.
