= West 9th Street Commercial Historic District =

Historic district in Delaware, United States

- U.S. National Register of Historic Places
- U.S. Historic district
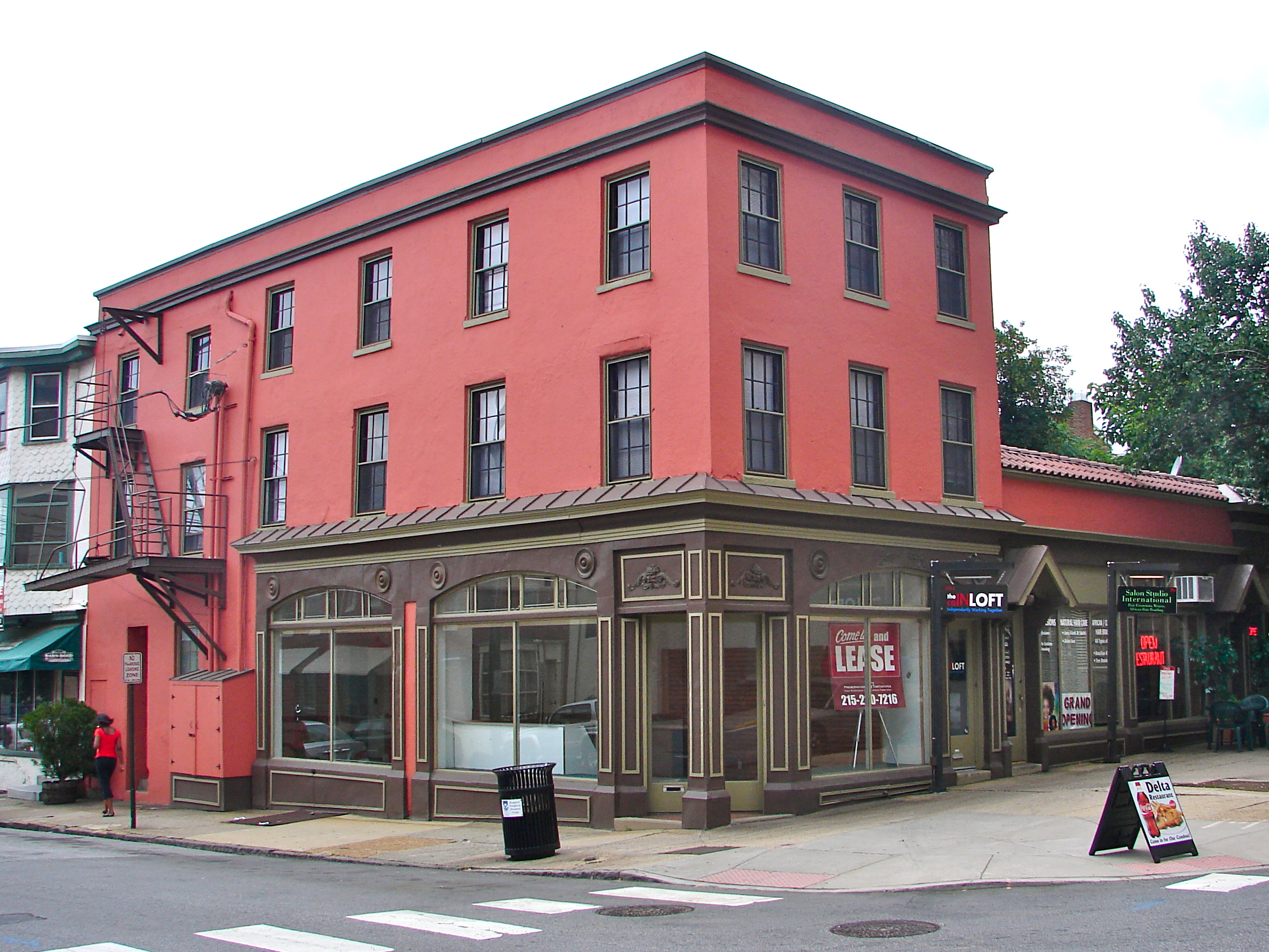
- West 9th Street Commercial Historic District, June 2011

- Location within Delaware Location within the United States
- Location: 111-320 W. 9th St., 901-909 N. Orange St., 825-901 N. Tatnall St., Wilmington, Delaware
- Coordinates: 39°44′44″N 75°33′02″W
- Area: 4 acres (1.6 ha)
- Built: 1908-1928
- Architect: Windrim, John Torrey; et al.
- Architectural style: Italianate, Colonial Revival
- NRHP reference No.: 08001204
- Added to NRHP: December 22, 2008

West 9th Street Commercial Historic District is a national historic district located at Wilmington, New Castle County, Delaware. It encompasses 28 contributing buildings in a commercial area of Wilmington developed in the early 20th century. The district includes representative examples of the Italianate and Colonial Revival styles

It was added to the National Register of Historic Places in 2008.

== Education ==
Residents are in the Christina School District. They are zoned to Stubbs Early Childhood Center (K-5), Bayard School (for grades 6–8), and Christiana High School.
