= Frank Masley =

American luger (1960–2016)

Personal information
- Nationality: American
- Born: June 30, 1960 Wilmington, Delaware
- Died: September 10, 2016 (aged 56) Wilmington, Delaware
- Education: Christiana High School; Drexel University

Sport
- Sport: Luge

Achievements and titles
- Olympic finals: 1980, 1984, 1988
- Updated on 18 September 2016

Francis Joseph "Frank" Masley (June 30, 1960 – September 10, 2016) was an American luger. He competed in the 1980, 1984, and 1988 Winter Olympics. He was the first Olympic flag-bearer in USA Luge history in the 1984 Olympic opening ceremonies.

Born in Wilmington, Delaware, Masley attended Christiana High School and later earned a degree in mechanical engineering from Drexel University.

He died of melanoma on September 10, 2016, aged 56, at home in Wilmington, Delaware.

== Business career ==
Frank founded Masley Enterprises INC in the basement of his own home in July 2000.

=== Company Awards ===
- Small Business Administration Delaware Small Business 2010 Person of the Year
- White House and the Small Business Administration Champion for Change award in 2014
- Delaware State Chamber of Commerce 2016 Gilman award

== Athletic career ==
Frank Masley started his luge career in the 1970s. During his career, he would compete in 3 winter Olympics, and collect 10 US titles in both singles and double luge events. Frank was the 1980, 1983, and 1984 doubles luge champion with his sliding partner, Raymond Bateman. He was the first Olympic flag-bearer in USA Luge history in the opening ceremonies of the 1984 Winter Olympic games.

In 1997 Masley was inducted into the Delaware Sports Hall of Fame.

Frank Masley was also chosen as the first inductee to USA Luge's Hall of Fame.

== Awards Named After ==
Two Awards were created in memory of Frank.

=== Frank Masley Champion Award from the Small Business Administration ===
- 2017 Winner: Bob O’Brien, SCORE. Wilmington
- 2018 Winner: Michelle Morin, Delaware Office of Supplier Diversity, Dover
- 2019 Winner: Michael Bowman, Delaware Small Business Development Center Newark

=== USA Luge Frank Masley Trophy ===
Olympic Games
| Preceded by Scott Hamilton | United States Flagbearer; Sarajevo 1984 | Succeeded by Ed Burke |
