= Shipley Run Historic District =

Historic district in Delaware, United States

- U.S. National Register of Historic Places
- U.S. Historic district
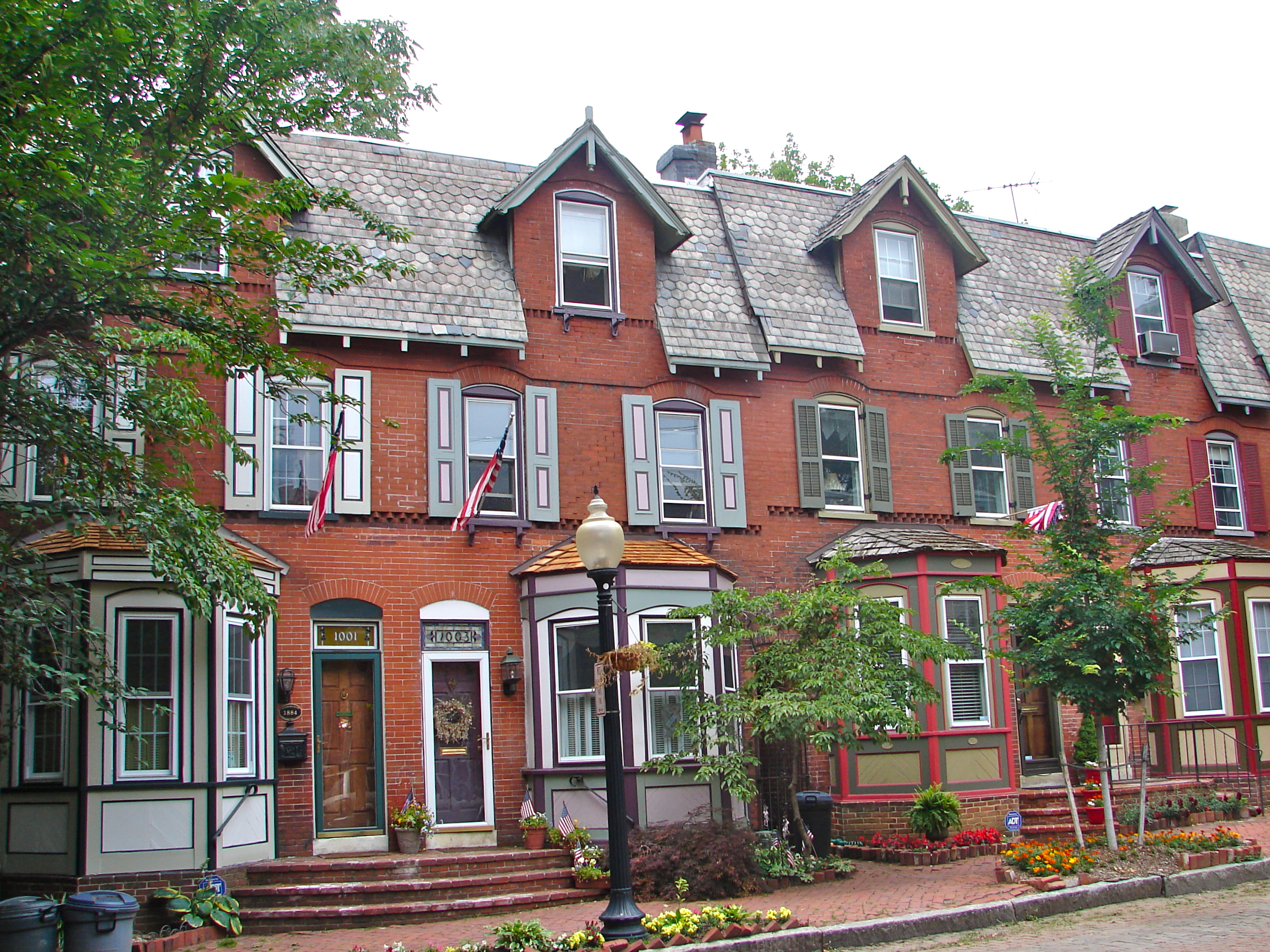
- 1001 Monroe, Shipley Run Historic District, June 2011

- Location within Delaware Location within the United States
- Location: Roughly bounded by Adams, 11th, Jefferson, and 7th Sts., Wilmington, Delaware
- Coordinates: 39°44′49″N 75°33′21″W
- Area: 34.4 acres (13.9 ha)
- Architectural style: Late Victorian
- NRHP reference No.: 84000854
- Added to NRHP: August 9, 1984

Shipley Run Historic District is a national historic district located at Wilmington, New Castle County, Delaware. It encompasses 408 contributing buildings in a residential area located west of the Wilmington central business district. It was developed in the mid- to late-19th century and primarily consists of single-family, attached and semi-detached rowhouse dwellings. They are in a variety of popular Late Victorian architectural styles including Second Empire, Queen Anne, Italianate, and Stick style.

It was added to the National Register of Historic Places in 1984.

== Education ==
Residents are in the Christina School District. They are zoned to Stubbs Early Childhood Center (K-5), Bancroft School (for grades 6–8), and Christiana High School.
