= Mesquite Championship Rodeo =

Annual rodeo

Coordinates: 32.76378°N 96.62407°W

- Genre: Rodeo
- Begins: Early June
- Ends: Late August
- Frequency: Annual
- Locations: Mesquite, Texas, U.S.
- Inaugurated: 1946
- Website: www.mesquiterodeo.com

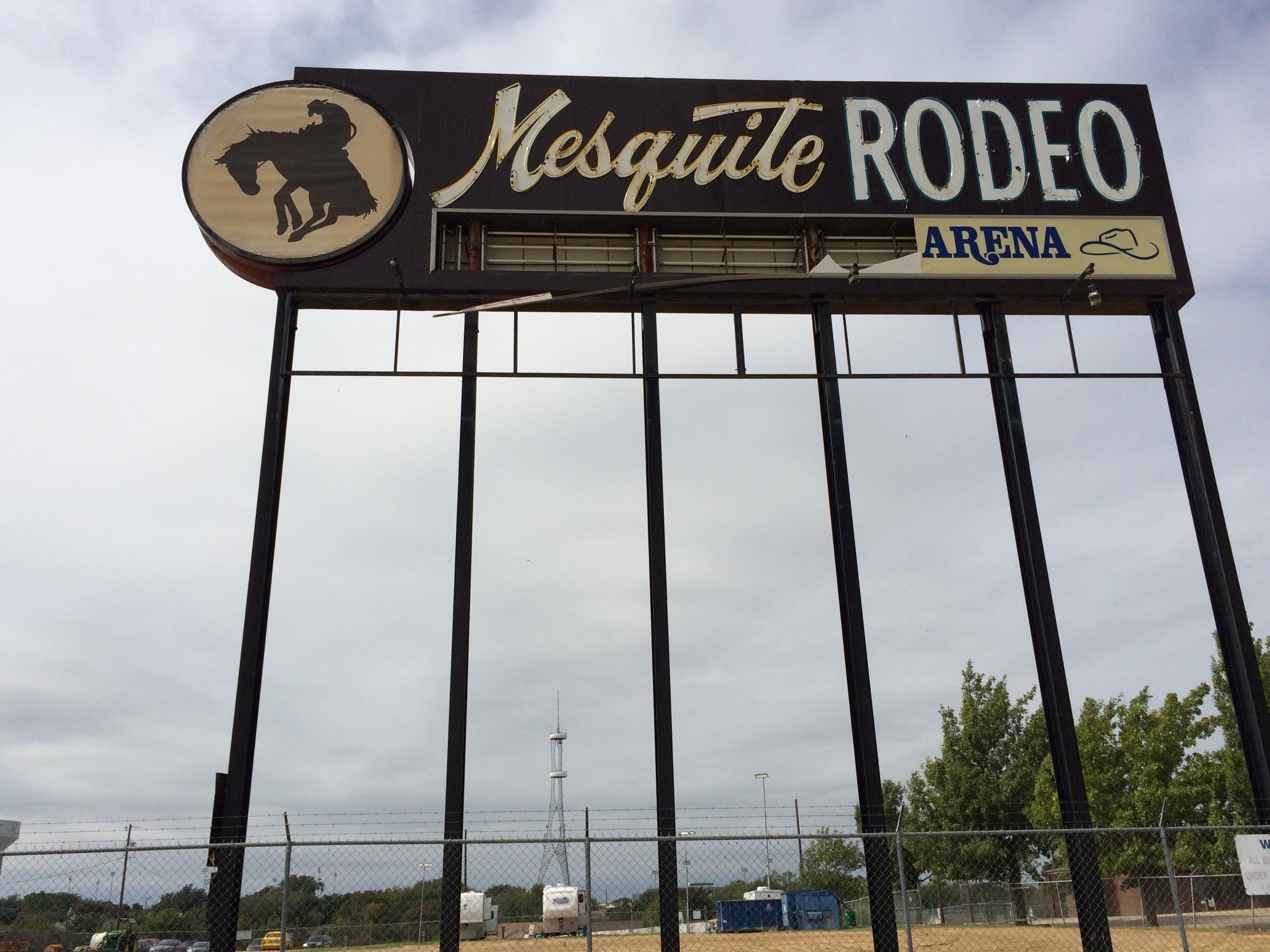
Mesquite Rodeo sign

The Mesquite Championship Rodeo is a rodeo located in Mesquite, Texas, United States, that operates every Saturday from June through August. It is only a 15-minute drive from Dallas, Texas. It is sanctioned by the Professional Rodeo Cowboys Association (PRCA). In 2020, it received the PRCA Small Rodeo of the Year award. It also received the Texas Small Rodeo of the Year award.

== History ==
Charlie Columbus McNally founded The original Mesquite Rodeo, which was a permanent location and did not move from town to town. It was held at the Charlie McNally's Arena which was located on Hickory Tree Road, a little to the north of present Rodeo Drive. The original Mesquite Rodeo dates from about 1946, but was preceded by the Pleasant Mound Rodeo which began in 1941, also started by Charlie McNally and is where Neal Gay got his start in 1945.

It was located on the northeast corner of Buckner Boulevard and Scyene Road. Ironically, it was closed when the City of Dallas annexed Pleasant Mound in 1950 and refused to issue a special zoning permit to the rodeo. Shortly thereafter Neal Gay, Jim Shoulders, Ira Akers and their associates purchased C.C. McNally's property in 1957. They built a new arena on the south side of the property on the north side of present Rodeo Drive for the 1958 opening of the professional, soon to be renamed, Mesquite Championship Rodeo. The entrance was still on Hickory Tree Road and passed north of the open arena (the roof was added in 1964) to a parking area on the west side. The brick kilns were just a few hundred feet southeast of the arena. The present arena was built in 1986 further south of the 1958 arena on the site of one of the clay pits. Rodeo Drive and Neal Gay Drive were constructed about the same time. The 1958 arena was torn down and the site remains undeveloped.

All that area had been in the Mesquite City limits since the mid 1950s expansion during the post war housing boom. The 1970 opening of 635 did not have any physical effect on the Mesquite Rodeo property, but it did provide the visibility that led to increased attendance.

The Mesquite Championship Rodeo was televised on ESPN from 1981 to 1986, and from 1986 to 1999 on TNN. In the 2000s, it was televised on Fox Sports Networks. It reached over 8.3 million households, to date, the most televised rodeo in the world next to the NHSRA 20X Rodeo High telecast on RFD-TV. Since 2020, the Mesquite Championship Rodeo is televised live on The Cowboy Channel and streamed live on the paywall-subscription-based Cowboy Channel+ app.

In 1985, ground was broken for the Mesquite Arena, a new facility for the Mesquite Rodeo, located near Interstate 635 and Scyene Road. By 1998, the facility was expanded to include a Convention Center, Exhibition Hall and a Hampton Inn & Suites. In 1999, Tom Hicks, owner of the Texas Rangers and the Dallas Stars, purchased Mesquite Championship Rodeo.

By 2001, attendance had grown to 200,000 during the season. In 2009, a group of investors formed a company called Camelot Sports & Entertainment and purchased the Mesquite Championship Rodeo from Hicks for an undisclosed sum. Camelot has reportedly invested nearly $1.5 million by adding high definition video boards over the bucking chutes, remodeling and refurbishing many of the suites in Mesquite Arena and adding a private restaurant called the 8 Second Club, which its members can use throughout the year. It was renamed Resistol Arena for several years after the Resistol hat company purchased the naming rights.

In 2015, the Mesquite Championship Rodeo was sold to Stace Smith Pro Rodeo.

The facility has hosted U.S. Presidents Ronald Reagan and George W. Bush, as well as Prince Rainier III of Monaco.
