= Fort Wayne Fusion =

Arena football team

Logo

General information
- Founded: 2006
- Folded: 2007
- Headquartered: Allen County War Memorial Coliseum in Fort Wayne, Indiana
- Colors: Burnt orange, regal purple, pearl white

Personnel
- Owner: af2
- General manager: Mike McCaffrey
- Head coach: Eddie Brown

Team history
- Fort Wayne Fusion (2007)

Home fields
- Allen County War Memorial Coliseum (2007)

League / conference affiliations
- af2 (2007): American Conference (2007); Midwest Division (2007)

The Fort Wayne Fusion was a 2007 af2 (Arena Football League's minor league) expansion team in the Midwest Division of the American Conference. They played their home games at the Allen County War Memorial Coliseum in Fort Wayne, Indiana, which was the former home of the defunct National Indoor Football League/United Indoor Football franchise, the Fort Wayne Freedom.

After only one year of existence, the Fusion folded and a new version of the Fort Wayne Freedom was formed for the Continental Indoor Football League.

== History ==
The franchise was announced in November, 2006 as an expansion team of the af2. Jeremy Golden was announced as the team's owner and general manager, and secured a lease with Allen County War Memorial Coliseum for home games. The team also announced that Arena Football League legend, Eddie Brown, would be the team first head coach. In January, the team named Mike McCaffrey as the team's General Manager to handle day-to-day operations for the Fusion. In February, the team announced the team colors would be Burnt Orange, Regal Purple and Pearl White. With the team struggling to find a quarterback through their exhibition games, the Fusion traded for Cody Hodges of the Oklahoma City Yard Dawgz. The Fusion played their first game in the af2 on March 31, 2007, against the Green Bay Blizzard, who were the then-defending American Conference champions. In July, 2007, the news surfaced that Owner Jeremy Golden had been removed as the owner of the Fusion by af2 Commissioner, Jerry Kurz. The Fusion finished the season 5–11, but with the loss of Golden during the season, the Fusion playing again in 2008 was very remote. In October, the city learned that Kurz had determined that the Fusion would not return in 2008.

=== 2007 schedule ===
The Fort Wayne Fusion's schedule for the 2007 season is as follows: (Home Games in bold)

| Date | Opponent | Time (Eastern) | Location | Result | Record |
|---|---|---|---|---|---|
| **Saturday, March 31, 2007** | **vs. Green Bay Blizzard** | **7:00 PM** | **Allen County War Memorial Coliseum** | **W** (36–28) | 1–0 |
| Saturday, April 7, 2007 | @ Bossier-Shreveport Battle Wings | 8:00 PM | CenturyTel Center | **L** (52–67) | 1–1 |
| **Sunday, April 15, 2007** | **vs. Spokane Shock** | **4:00 PM** | **Allen County War Memorial Coliseum** | **W** (63–56) | 2–1 |
| Saturday, April 21, 2007 | @ Manchester Wolves | 7:05 PM | Verizon Wireless Arena | **L** (41–54) | 2–2 |
| **Saturday, April 28, 2007** | **vs. Albany Conquest** | **7:00 PM** | **Allen County War Memorial Coliseum** | **L** (21–35) | 2–3 |
| Saturday, May 5, 2007 | @ Cincinnati Jungle Kats | 7:30 PM | U.S. Bank Arena | **L** (32–35) | 2–4 |
| **Friday, May 11, 2007** | **vs. Louisville Fire** | **7:30 PM** | **Allen County War Memorial Coliseum** | **L** (42–48) | 2–5 |
| Saturday, May 19, 2007 | BYE WEEK |
| **Saturday, May 26, 2007** | **vs. Tennessee Valley Vipers** | **7:00 PM** | **Allen County War Memorial Coliseum** | **W** (56–33) | 3–5 |
| Saturday, June 2, 2007 | @ Albany Conquest | 4:00 PM | Times Union Center | **L** (33–77) | 3–6 |
| **Friday, June 8, 2007** | **vs. Quad City Steamwheelers** | **7:30 PM** | **Allen County War Memorial Coliseum** | **L** (47–64) | 3–7 |
| Saturday, June 16, 2007 | @ Louisville Fire | 7:00 PM | Freedom Hall | **W** (52–34) | 4–7 |
| Friday, June 22, 2007 | @ Green Bay Blizzard | 8:30 PM | Resch Center | **L** (28–54) | 4–8 |
| **Saturday, June 30, 2007** | **vs. Cincinnati Jungle Kats** | **7:00 PM** | **Allen County War Memorial Coliseum** | **W** (47–25) | 5–8 |
| **Saturday, July 7, 2007** | **vs. Wilkes-Barre/Scranton Pioneers** | **7:00 PM** | **Allen County War Memorial Coliseum** | **L** (47–48) | 5–9 |
| Saturday, July 14, 2007 | @ Tennessee Valley Vipers | 8:30 PM | Von Braun Center | **L** (48–61) | 5–10 |
| Saturday, July 21, 2007 | BYE WEEK |
| Thursday, July 26, 2007 | @ Quad City Steamwheelers | 8:30 PM | iWireless Center | **L** (55–56) | 5–11 |

=== Season-by-season ===
Season records
| Season | W | L | T | Finish | Playoff results |
|---|---|---|---|---|---|
| 2007 | 5 | 11 | 0 | 4th AC Midwest | -- |

== Final roster ==
Fort Wayne Fusion roster
| Quarterbacks: 15 Blayne Baggett; 12 Joe Micco; Fullbacks: 9 Tyus Jackson FB/LB; 30 Joe Johnsonbaugh FB/LB; Wide receivers: 8 Jonathan Graham; 11 Jermaine Jackson; 25 Cesare Manning; 17 Mario Pratcher | Offensive linemen: 65 Lenard Black; 66 Randy Degg; 99 A. J. Lindsay; 72 Stephenol Santos; 97 Lou Vega; Defensive linemen: 95 Ernest Bentz; 91 Darian Tate; 33 Ken West | Linebackers: 11 Jermaine Jackson; 9 Tyus Jackson; 30 Joe Johnsonbaugh; Defensive backs: 14 Arthur Berlanga; 2 Derek Brown; 1 Derrick Simmons; 3 Nate Williams; Special teams: 6 Kyle Hooper K | Injured reserve: 14 Barry Drakeford DB (IR); 3 R. J. Harvey KR (IR); 10 Cody Hodges QB (IR); 93 Patrick P'au (IR); 21 Jamal Rufu DB (IR); 1 Tyrone Walker WR (IR); 4 Terell White (IR); 89 Rodney Wormley DL (IR); rookies in italics Roster updated July 15, 2007; 21 Active, 8 Inactive |

== Coaches of note ==
=== Head coaches ===
Note: Statistics are correct through the end of the 2007 af2 season.

| Name | Term | Regular season | | | | Playoffs | | Awards |
| Name | Term | W | L | T | Win% | W | L | Awards |
|---|---|---|---|---|---|---|---|---|
| Eddie Brown | 2007 | 5 | 11 | 0 | .313 | 0 | 0 | |

=== Coaching staff ===
Fort Wayne Fusion staff
| Front office: General manager – Mike McCaffrey; Asst. General Manager – Elvis Ahlborn; Team services – Greg Moyer; Radio play-by-play – Dean Jackson; Head coach: Head coach – Eddie Brown; Offensive coaches: Offensive Coordinator – | Defensive coaches: Defensive coordinator – Tony Henderson |

== See also ==
- History of sports in Fort Wayne, Indiana
