= Topeka Tropics =

American indoor football team

Logo

General information
- Founded: 2021
- Folded: 2024
- Headquartered: Stormont Vail Events Center in Topeka, Kansas
- Colors: Teal, orange, and tan
- TopekaTropics.com

Personnel
- Owners: TCB Consulting LLC - Trevor Burdett, Chad Logan, Josh Barr

Team history
- Topeka Tropics (2022–2023)

Home fields
- Stormont Vail Events Center (2022–2023)

League / conference affiliations
- Champions Indoor Football (2022–2023)

The Topeka Tropics were a professional indoor football based in Topeka, Kansas, and played their home games at the Stormont Vail Events Center. The team originally folded after its inaugural 2022 season, but was renewed under new ownership before the 2023 season. The Tropics a were the third indoor football team to be based in Topeka following the Topeka Knights/Kings (1999–2000) and the Kansas Koyotes (2003–2014).

== History ==
On August 9, 2021, Champions Indoor Football (CIF) announced an expansion team to be based in Topeka for the 2022 season with Sioux City Bandits' owner J. R. Bond serving as the team's owner and Brett Kell as the assistant general manager of game day operations. After a name-the-team contest was held, the Tropics name, logo, and color scheme were unveiled on September 8. Although Topeka does not have a tropical climate and is roughly 790 miles from the closest sea (the Gulf of Mexico), Bond chose the unusual name to symbolize how unconventional the Tropics organization would be both on and off the field. On October 5, the Tropics announced former Arena Football League player Tyus Jackson as its inaugural head coach. The team did not win a regular season game, posting a record of 0–10 in their first season. On August 25, 2022, the Tropics announced that they would cease operations and not return for a second season; however, this decision was reversed later that same year after new local ownership was found.

In July 2023, the Tropics announced they were leaving the CIF for a new league along with the Omaha Beef and Sioux City Bandits. They joined the National Arena League (NAL) for the 2024 season on September 14. They also announced Kerry Locklin as their new head coach. By February 2024, the NAL revoked the Tropics' franchise for failure to pay league dues and the team's prospective owner for the 2024 season backed out of an agreement to buy the team, prompting management to release an open letter begging the Topeka business community to buy the team. This was ultimately unsuccessful, and on February 28, 2024, the league terminated the Tropics membership. Co-owner Trevor Burdett and coach Tyus Jackson joined the Iowa Rampage of the Arena Football League, a league that absorbed the remnants of CIF.

== Season-by-season results ==
League champions	Playoff berth	League leader

Season	League	Regular season			Postseason results
Season	League	Finish	Wins	Losses	Postseason results
2022	CIF	8th	0	10	Did not qualify
2023	CIF	7th	1	9	Did not qualify
Totals			1	19	All-time regular season record
Totals			0	0	All-time postseason record
Totals			1	19	All-time regular season and postseason record

== Head coaches ==
Name	Tenure	Regular season			Playoffs		Awards
Name	Tenure	W	L	Win%	W	L	Awards
Tyus Jackson	2022–2023	1	19	.050	0	0	
