= Niem Green =

American Entrepreneur (born 1982)

- Born: October 9, 1982 (age 43); Philadelphia, Pennsylvania, U.S.
- Education: Wilmington University
- Occupation: Entrepreneur
- Children: 3
- Writing career
- Pen name: The Daydreaming Mogul
- Language: English and Spanish
- Years active: 2009 - Present
- Genres: Fiction and Non-Fiction
- Subjects: Relationships, Credit, and Finance
- Notable awards: Delaware Top 40 Professionals Under 40
- Website: Official website

Niem M. Green (born October 9, 1982), also known by his stage name Nye the Daydreaming Mogul, is an American businessman, Internet entrepreneur, rapper, songwriter, author, motivational speaker, record producer and founder of creditscoredating.com. He worked in the financial sector and founded an online dating service. He released the book The Daydreaming Mogul's Guide Vol. 1 Daydreams and Success on how to achieve one's desires through the power of daydreaming.

== Early life ==
Green was born on October 9, 1982, in Philadelphia, Pennsylvania. He was raised in Philadelphia by his mother Gwendolyn (Payne), a court clerk for the City of Philadelphia. Green moved to Delaware at the age of 17 and graduated from Christiana High School in Newark, Delaware. Green was a marketing major at Wilmington University in New Castle, Delaware and received his Bachelors of Science in 2013.

== Career ==
In 2000, Green was hired as a credit analyst and was introduced to credit and lending at JP Morgan Chase Bank.

In 2006, Green launched Creditscoredating, an online dating site that matched single by financial compatibility and credit scores.

In 2009, Green released The Daydreaming Mogul's Guide Vol. 1 Daydreams and Success, a non-fiction guide outlining how to set goals and define success for readers.

In 2013, Green released Fallen Soldiers The Rise, a coming of age novel centered around the tragedy of 9/11/2001. The novel was based loosely on events that affected Green's personal life.

In 2016, Green released, The Daydreaming Mogul's Guide Volume 2: Credit Score Dating - The Sexiness of Credit. The book that outlined the basis and reasoning behind green's site, Creditscoredating.

In 2017, Green announced that he would be releasing an album to further engage millennials in the credit score dating brand and released the Hip-hop single "Daydream Girl". Green released a collector's edition of the 2 volumes of The Daydreaming Mogul's Guide, globally through Green Walk Media Group.

== Press ==
Chains Inc and The News Journal Awarded Green as one of the 40 top professionals under 40 in 2015.

In 2013 Green was featured on NBC's Today show as his first appearance to the world as the founder of the site creditscoredating.com

In 2015 Green appeared alongside Geraldo Rivera on Fox Business News' Mornings with Maria where Credit Score Dating was featured.

== Personal life ==
Green is father to three children from a previous relationship, two of which are step-children.
