= Leon Mackey =

American football player (born 1989)

No. 49, 96, 97, 93, 22, 35
- Position: Defensive end

Personal information
- Born: February 28, 1989 (age 37); Wilmington, Delaware, U.S.
- Listed height: 6 ft 5 in (1.96 m)
- Listed weight: 260 lb (118 kg)

Career information
- High school: Newark (DE) Christina
- College: Texas Tech
- NFL draft: 2013: undrafted

Career history
- Green Bay Blizzard (2014); Arizona Rattlers (2014); Minnesota Vikings (2015)*; Chicago Eagles (2016); Winnipeg Blue Bombers (2016)*; Arizona Rattlers (2016–2017); Baltimore Brigade (2017)*; Jacksonville Sharks (2018); Washington Valor (2019)
- * Offseason or practice squad member only

Awards and highlights
- ArenaBowl champion (2014); United Bowl champion (2017)

Career AFL statistics
- Tackles: 4.5
- Sacks: 0.5
- INTs: 0
- Stats at ArenaFan.com
- Stats at Pro Football Reference

Leon Mackey (born February 28, 1989) is an American former football defensive end. He played college football for the Texas Tech. He signed his first NFL contract with the Minnesota Vikings after spending the 2014 season with the Arizona Rattlers of the Arena Football League (AFL).

== Early life ==
Born in Florida, Mackey moved to Wilmington, Delaware where he was a standout defensive end at Christiana High School. He spent the 2008 campaign at Hargrave Military Academy, where he was considered a four-star prospect by Scout.com. He selected South Carolina after originally committing to Clemson and turning down offers from Arkansas and North Carolina, among others. He originally signed with Virginia Tech, but failed to qualify academically.

== College career ==
Mackey began his collegiate career at Hinds Community College in Raymond, Mississippi before transferring to Texas Tech in 2011, where he played for two years. At Hinds, Mackey in nine games for Head Coach Gene Murphy, recording 47 tackles (36 solo), 15.5 tackles for a loss of 53 yards, 4.5 sacks for a loss of 19 yards and forcing one fumble. He received first-team All-conference honors.

In his final season at Texas Tech in 2012, Mackey earned All-Big 12 honorable mention.

== Professional career ==
Pre-draft measurables
Height	Weight	40-yard dash	10-yard split	20-yard split	20-yard shuttle	Three-cone drill	Vertical jump	Broad jump	Bench press
6 ft 5 in (1.96 m)	255 lb (116 kg)	4.75 s	1.64 s	2.73 s	4.52 s	7.28 s	29 in (0.74 m)	9 ft 0 in (2.74 m)	20 reps
All values from Pro Day

=== Arizona Rattlers ===
Mackey spent the 2014 season with the Arizona Rattlers of the Arena Football League (AFL). Mackey recorded a half sack in two regular season games with the Rattlers in 2014 before recording three sacks in the playoffs, helping the Rattlers win the ArenaBowl XXVII Championship Title.

=== Minnesota Vikings ===
On January 5, 2015, Mackey was signed by the Minnesota Vikings of the National Football League (NFL) in recognition of his "athleticism," "explosive" ability, "effort," and "determination" demonstrated in both his 2014 stints with the Indoor Football and later Arena Football Leagues, and in his 2015 Vikings tryout. "

=== Chicago Eagles ===
In April 2016, Mackey signed with the Chicago Eagles.

=== Baltimore Brigade ===
Mackey was assigned to the Baltimore Brigade on January 19, 2017. He was placed on recallable reassignment on March 31, 2017. On July 8, the Rattlers defeated the Sioux Falls Storm in the United Bowl by a score of 50–41.

=== Jacksonville Sharks ===
On October 5, 2017, Mackey signed with the Jacksonville Sharks.

== Mixed martial arts career ==
Mackey would make his MMA debut against Brant Campbell at LFA 188 on July 12, 2024. He would lose the fight via technical knockout in the second round.

== Mixed martial arts record ==
Professional record breakdown
1 match	0 wins	1 loss
By knockout	0	1

Res.	Record	Opponent	Method	Event	Date	Round	Time	Location	Notes
Loss	0–1	Brent Campbell	TKO (punches)	LFA 188	July 12, 2024	2	4:14	Chandler, Arizona, United States	Heavyweight debut.
