= Christiana High School =

Location
- 190 Salem Church Road; Newark, Delaware 19713; United States; 39°39′55″N 75°41′42″W

Information
- Type: Public
- Established: 1963 (63 years ago)
- School district: Christina School District
- CEEB code: 080113
- Principal: Tom Kalinowski
- Teaching staff: 80.60 (FTE)
- Grades: 6-12
- Enrollment: 1,340 (2023-2024)
- Student to teacher ratio: 16.63
- Colors: Royal blue, red, and silver
- Athletics: Vikings
- Athletics conference: Blue Hen Conference - Flight B
- Website: www.christinak12.org/christianahs

Christiana High School (CHS) is a public high school in unincorporated New Castle County, Delaware and has a Newark postal address. It is a part of the Christina School District. CHS serves a portion of Wilmington including the Shipley Run and West 9th Street historic districts. In the suburbs, it serves parts of Brookside and Bear.

== History ==
Founded in 1963, Christiana High School is one of three traditional high schools in the Christina School District, the other two being Newark High School and Glasgow High School. It is located outside of Newark near the University of Delaware.

The building was designed by Wilmington architects Martin & Wason.

== Curriculum ==
CHS' curriculum focuses on agricultural and health sciences. In accordance with the State of Delaware, Christiana students must complete the following credits to be eligible for graduation: 4.5 credits of electives; 4 credits of English and math; 3 credits of science and social studies; 2 language credits; 1 credit of physical education and an additional science or social studies course; and 0.5 health credit. They must also complete the Senior Project and Student Success Plan (SSP) 3 credits of the Career Pathways program. Seniors are required to complete a cross-disciplinary research project.

In 2004, the Christina School District was awarded a federal grant to create smaller learning communities to help improve the overall high school experience for students. CHS was named a National Blue Ribbon School in 1984.

== Honors Academy ==
On January 5, 2017, CHS announced that they would open a middle school alongside the normal high school. Unlike the high school, the middle school is purely a honors academy, with no connected standard middle school. When opened in 2017 only 6th graders would join, the following year, they would also accept 7th, and in 2019, they would finally accept 8th graders. Unlike a standard middle school, classes would be at a high school level, and students enrolled could earn college credits while still in middle school. The honors academy continues until the 12th grade, and students who stay in the school can receive classes from a local university, Wilmington University. In the 2023-2024 school year, the first class of the middle school honors academy graduated from the high school.

== Notable alumni ==
- George N. Parks (class of 1971), former director of the University of Massachusetts Minuteman Marching Band
- Jamie Duncan, former NFL player drafted by the Tampa Bay Buccaneers; two-time NCAA All-American and SEC Defensive Player of the Year at Vanderbilt University
- Niem Green (class of 2001), rapper, author, and entrepreneur
- Frank Masley, three-time Olympian (1980, 1984, and 1988) in luge
- Leon Mackey, football player for the NFL and AFL; currently a free agent
- Sap, hip hop producer and rapper
