= The Monument (Rapid City, South Dakota) =

Arenas in Rapid City, South Dakota, U.S.

Coordinates: 44.08854°N 103.225816°W

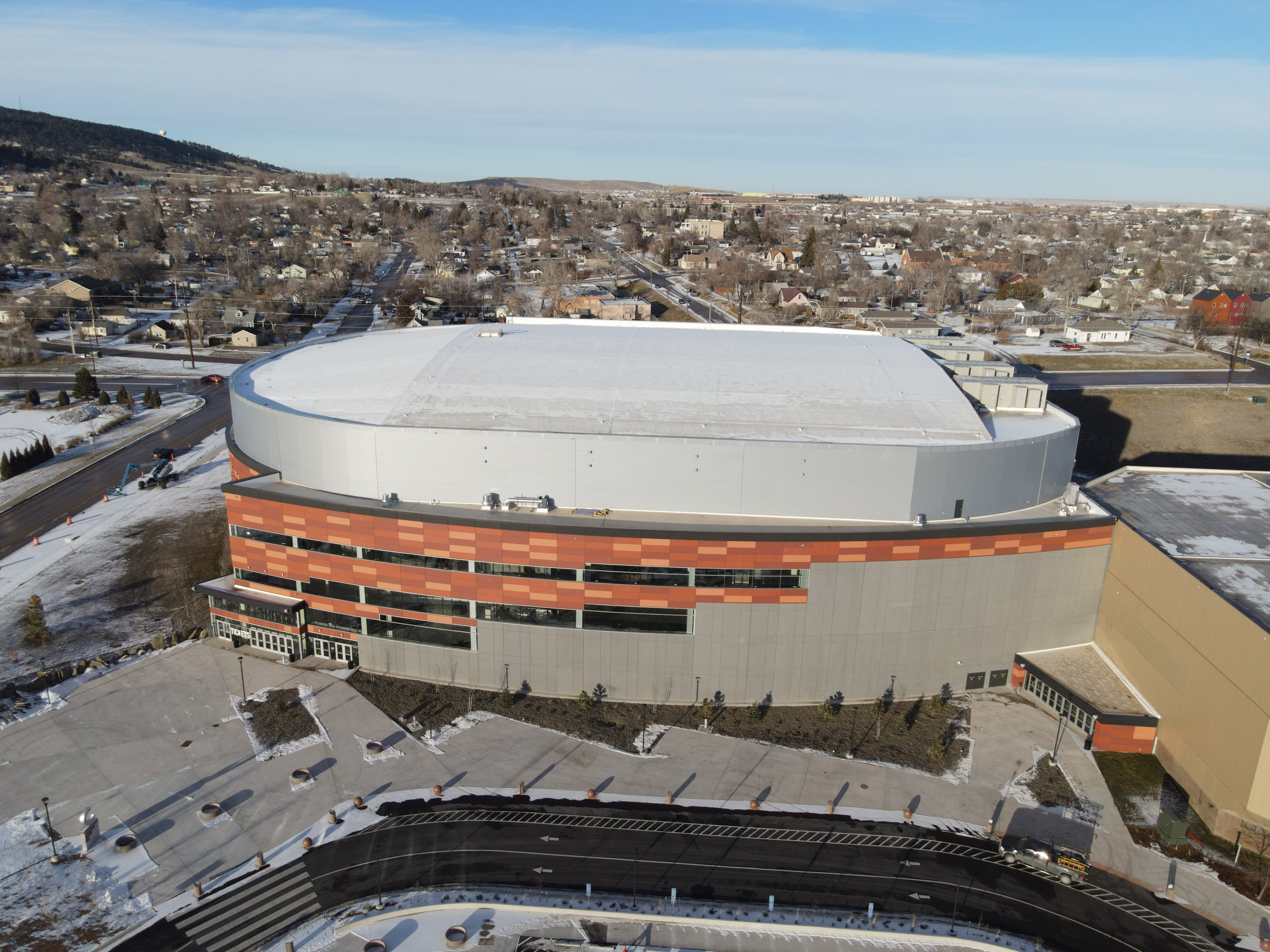

- Location within South Dakota Location within the United States
- Location: 444 North Mount Rushmore Road; Rapid City, South Dakota
- Owner: City of Rapid City
- Operator: City of Rapid City
- Capacity: Summit Arena: 10,000; Ice Arena: 7,500; Barnett Fieldhouse: 2,000; Fine Arts Theatre: 1,690
- Surface: Multi-surface
- Public transit: Rapid Ride

Construction
- Groundbreaking: 1973
- Built: 1977
- Opened: June 21, 1977
- Expanded: 2021
- Cost: $24 million (2008 addition) $130 million (2021 expansion)
- Architects: Four Front Design Inc. (2008 addition); Perkins + Will (2021 expansion)

The Monument, formerly known as Rushmore Plaza Civic Center and Rushmore Plaza, is a 500,000-square-foot (46,000 m^{2}) exhibition center, in Rapid City, South Dakota. The Monument is the main event center for the Black Hills Region, serving Western South Dakota, South East Montana, South West North Dakota, North West Nebraska, and Eastern Wyoming.

It is home to many large annual events, including the Black Hills Stock Show and Rodeo & Rodeo Rapid City, Lakota Nation Invitational, the Black Hills Homebuilders Expo, South Dakota High School Activities Association Tournaments, the Rapid City Rush ice hockey team of the ECHL, and the Rapid City Marshals of Champions Indoor Football, who in 2024, folded. The grand opening event was a concert by Elvis Presley on June 21, 1977, which was filmed for a CBS television special Elvis in Concert that aired in October. The concert was during the singer's final tour before his death on August 16, 1977.

The center contains two multi-purpose arenas: an ice arena, home to the Rapid City Rush hockey team, and the 10,000-seat Summit Arena completed in October 2021 that is home to the Rapid City Marshals. The venue also contains a fieldhouse, a fine arts theatre, two large convention/exhibit halls, and numerous other meeting rooms. After the venue was remodeled in 2021, the Rushmore Plaza Civic Center was renamed The Monument after a naming rights agreement with Monument Health Rapid City Hospital.
