= Iowa Rampage =

American indoor football team

Logo

General information
- Founded: 2023
- Folded: 2024
- Headquartered: Council Bluffs, Iowa at Mid-America Center
- Colors: Red, black, white
- IowaRampage.com

Personnel
- General manager: Tony Doremus
- Head coach: Tyus Jackson
- President: Trevor Burdett

Team history
- Iowa Rampage (2024)

Home fields
- Mid-America Center never played home game (2024)

League / conference affiliations
- Arena Football League (2024)

The Iowa Rampage were a professional arena football team based in Council Bluffs, Iowa. They were announced as one of the inaugural teams for the revived Arena Football League (AFL).

They were the second official Iowa-based team to play in the league and the first since the Iowa Barnstormers who played off and on in the previous two AFL incarnations from 1995 to 2014 in Des Moines before moving to the Indoor Football League.

On May 2, 2024, after playing a single game (a 58–28 win over the Rapid City Marshals), the team announced they would be discontinuing operations immediately. Ultimately, the Rampage never played in Iowa; had the team survived to play its first home game, it would have played at the Mid-America Center.

== History ==
=== Founding ===
Four years after the AFL folded for the second time, it was announced on February 1, 2023, that the league intended on relaunching in 2024. On July 18, the 16 intended market cities were announced. Iowa was not among the inaugural markets announced.

The AFL announced on October 10, 2023, that the Rampage would become the newest team to join the league. The name "Rampage" appears to have originated from a hoax in which critics of the league had set up a fake "St. Louis Rampage" social media account (itself a parody of the St. Louis Rams, who left St. Louis in 2016; St. Louis had been one of the 16 announced markets but would ultimately not get a team); after revealing the hoax, those who had set up the fake team said they would turn the social media account over to the AFL. (This never came to pass, and the account remains operational as a satire page.)

The owner was Trevor Burdett and the head coach was Tyus Jackson, both of whom had filled similar roles for the Topeka Tropics of Champions Indoor Football the previous year.

=== Closure ===
On May 2, 2024, following a 58–28 road win over the Rapid City Marshals, the Rampage issued a statement stating the team was folding immediately, accusing commissioner Lee Hutton of reneging on promises to compensate the Rampage and the Champions Indoor Football teams that had agreed to join the AFL for increased expenses. Fellow CIF transplants, the Marshals and Billings Outlaws, corroborated the Rampage's claims, as did the Washington Wolfpack. The Rampage owner walked back its previous accusations against Hutton, stating he would not specifically blame any entity or person for the team's failure, after Hutton accused him of spreading "knowingly false information." The Rampage apologized to the Council Bluffs community and fan base and announced that its assets would be liquidated in an effort to cover its expenses up to that point. Hours after the announcement, the Southwest Kansas Storm claimed that the league was still going forward with the Storm's upcoming game against the now-nonexistent Rampage and would pay the Rampage players to travel to Dodge City to play the game; the Storm defeated the Rampage, 34–18, in what would be the final game of their existence. The Rampage directed fans and sponsors to the Omaha Beef, who play across the Missouri River from the Rampage in Omaha, Nebraska and agreed to honor tickets for Rampage events.
