= Randy Degg =

American football player (born 1984)

No. 94
- Position: Center / Long snapper

Personal information
- Born: September 28, 1984 (age 42); Pinconning, Michigan, U.S.
- Listed height: 6 ft 3 in (1.91 m)
- Listed weight: 310 lb (141 kg)

Career information
- College: Northwood
- NFL draft: 2007: undrafted

Career history
- Fort Wayne Fusion (2007); Amarillo Dusters (2008); Saginaw Sting (2009); Jacksonville Sharks (2010–2011)

Awards and highlights
- ArenaBowl champion (2011); First-team All-Arena (2011); Second-team All-American (2006)
- Stats at ArenaFan.com

Randy "Nick" Degg (born September 28, 1984) is an American former professional arena football player. He played as a center for Northwood University. He was signed as an undrafted free agent by the Fort Wayne Fusion in 2007.

== College career ==
Degg played as a center for Northwood University. He was named an honorable mention All-American by D2Football.com his junior year in 2005. He earned Don Hansen's Football Gazette second-team All-American honors as a senior in 2006.

== Professional career ==
=== Fort Wayne Fusion ===
He was signed as an undrafted free agent by the Fort Wayne Fusion in 2007.

=== Amarillo Dusters ===
Degg started as the team's center in 2008.

=== Saginaw Sting ===
Degg returned to the state of Michigan, and played with many of his former college teammates again, as the Saginaw Sting were preparing to move to the Indoor Football League after a 2008 CIFL Championship victory.

=== Jacksonville Sharks ===
In 2009, Degg signed with the Jacksonville Sharks. He was the team's only center, and started all 16 regular season games and one playoff game for the Sharks. Degg also doubled as the Sharks’ long snapper for the kicking game. In 2011, Degg was named first-team All-Arena and won the ArenaBowl with the Sharks.
