= Jermaine Jackson (wide receiver, born 1982) =

American gridiron football player (born 1982)

No. 89
- Position: Wide receiver

Personal information
- Born: May 22, 1982 (age 44); Detroit, Michigan, U.S.
- Listed height: 6 ft 2 in (1.88 m)
- Listed weight: 208 lb (94 kg)

Career information
- High school: Pershing
- College: Saginaw Valley State
- NFL draft: 2007: undrafted

Career history
- 2006: Port Huron Pirates
- 2007: Fort Wayne Fusion
- 2009–2010: Calgary Stampeders
- Stats at CFL.ca

Jermaine Jackson (born May 22, 1982 in Detroit, Michigan) is a former professional Canadian football wide receiver for the Calgary Stampeders of the Canadian Football League. He was signed by the Port Huron Pirates as a street free agent in 2007. He played college football for the Saginaw Valley State Cardinals.

Jackson has also played for the Fort Wayne Fusion.
