= Mesquite Convention Center and Arena =

American rodeo venue

- Location within Texas Location within the United States
- Full name: Mesquite Convention Center and Arena
- Location: 1818 Rodeo Drive; Mesquite, Texas 75149
- Coordinates: 32.76164°N 96.62579°W
- Capacity: 7,000

Construction
- Opened: 1985; 41 years ago
- Renovated: 2009; 17 years ago

Tenants
- Mesquite Championship Rodeo; Mesquite/Dallas Marshals (CIF) (2016–2017); Mesquite Outlaws (MASL) (2019–2020, 2022–2024); Dallas Apex (NAL) (2027–future)

The Mesquite Convention Center and Arena, also known as Gomez Western Wear Arena for sponsorship reasons, is a multi venue complex consisting of a 7,000-seat multi-purpose arena and a 50,000 square foot convention center in Mesquite, Texas, United States. It is home to the Mesquite Championship Rodeo and was home to the Texas Outlaws indoor soccer team of the Major Arena Soccer League.

The arena has been holding events since 1985. The types of events in the modern age currently include rodeos, monster truck wars, boxing, and concerts. However, the arena is also available for other major events and can host groups of people up to 7,000. From early June to the end of August, however, the arena is occupied by the Mesquite Championship Rodeo and is not available then. Otherwise, the arena, along with the convention center, can be reserved for such events as business meetings, family reunions, trade shows, conventions, holiday parties, weddings and receptions, birthday parties, and company training.

== Rodeo and other events ==
The rodeo features bull riding with many amenities and top riders. Recent country music concerts have featured Travis Tritt, The Charlie Daniels Band, Diamond Rio, Clay Walker, and Mark Chesnutt.
