= Gillette Mustangs =

Professional indoor football team

Logo

General information
- Founded: 2020
- Folded: 2024
- Headquartered: Wyoming Center at the CAM-PLEX in Gillette, Wyoming
- Colors: Black, yellow, white and green
- GilletteMustangs.com

Personnel
- Owner: Steven Titus
- General manager: Cedric Walker
- Head coach: Cedric Walker

Team history
- Wyoming Mustangs (2021–2022); Gillette Mustangs (2023)

Home fields
- CAM-PLEX Wyoming Center (2021–2023) (2026–)

League / conference affiliations
- Champions Indoor Football (2021–2023)

Playoff appearances (2)
- 2022, 2023

The Gillette Mustangs (formerly Wyoming Mustangs) were a professional arena football team based in Gillette, Wyoming, with home games at Wyoming Center at the CAM-PLEX. The team was owned by Steven Titus, also owner of the Billings Outlaws.

== History ==
=== Champions Indoor Football (2021–2023) ===
The team was founded by Keith Russ and Tel Koen as a 2021 expansion team and a member of Champions Indoor Football (CIF) in 2020. They would begin play at the Wyoming Center at the CAM-PLEX in 2021. In their inaugural season, they would finish 2–8.

In 2022, Gillette lawyer Steven Titus purchased the team from Russ, as well as Russ' other team, the Billings Outlaws. The team had its first playoff berth in its second season eventually losing to the Outlaws. It was announced in late 2022 that Titus would rename the team to the Gillette Mustangs to shift the focus of the team's name from the state of Wyoming to the City of Gillette.

Original Wyoming Mustangs logo (2021–2023)

Following the 2023 season, Titus announced that his Outlaws team would join the relaunched Arena Football League for the 2024 season, and that the Mustangs' head coach Cedric Walker would be the Outlaws' head coach. Titus initially attempted to put the Mustangs up for sale, believing that CIF would continue operating. On September 25, the Mustangs' former website posted that due to the CIF teams joining the relaunched AFL, and that the CAM-PLEX is incapable of the rebound nets used in that league, that the team would be unable to return to Gillette in 2024. Titus indicated that the Mustangs' AFL rights would be transferred to a new team in Kansas, what eventually became the Wichita Regulators.

== Season-by-season results ==
League champions	Conference champions	Division champions	Playoff berth	League leader

Season	League	Conference	Division	Regular season				Postseason results
Season	League	Conference	Division	Finish	Wins	Losses	Ties	Postseason results
2021	CIF			6th	2	8	0	
2022	CIF			6th	3	7	0	Lost Quarterfinal (Billings Outlaws) 40–49
2023	CIF			3rd	7	3	0	Won Quarterfinal (Southwest Kansas Storm) 40–35; Lost Semifinal (Salina Liberty) 30–37
Totals					12	18	0	All-time regular season record
Totals					1	2	—	All-time postseason record
Totals					13	20	0	All-time regular season and postseason record (2021–2023)
