= Chicago Eagles (CIF) =

Indoor gridiron football team

- Founded: 2014
- Folded: 2016
- League: CIF (2016)
- Division: Northern (2016)
- Team history: Gary Dawgs (2014–2015); Illiana Eagles (2015); Chicago Eagles (2015–2016)
- Based in: Chicago, Illinois
- Arena: UIC Pavilion
- Colors: Red, Blue, White
- Owner: Brian Brundage
- Head coach: Mel Hay/ OL Chuck Miller
- General manager: Alex Hafer
- Championships: 0
- Playoff berths: 0
- Website: chicagoeagles.us

The Chicago Eagles were a professional indoor football team and a member of Champions Indoor Football (CIF) that played during the 2016 season. Based in Chicago, Illinois, the Eagles played their home games at the UIC Pavilion. The team was considered on hiatus for the 2017 season, but did not return.

== History ==
Gary Dawgs logo (2014)

The team was founded in 2014 as the Gary Dawgs, an expansion franchise of the CIF for the 2015 season planned for Gary, Indiana. On October 14, 2014, the team announced that it would delay its launch until the 2016 CIF season after co-owner Mike Dortch left the ownership group to pursue other opportunities. Rebranded the Illiana Eagles ("Illiana", a portmanteau of Illinois and Indiana, is the geographical region around the eastern edge of Illinois and the western edge of Indiana) in November 2014, the franchise was accepted into the CIF on February 19, 2015. On August 19, 2015, the Bloomington Edge from Bloomington, Illinois joined the CIF and are expected to form a strong inter-state rivalry with the Eagles.

On December 16, the Eagles quietly changed their name to the Chicago Eagles.

After only one season, the team suspended operations for the 2017 season with hopes to return for the 2018 season, but were never mentioned by the league afterward.

== Season-by-season results ==
League champions	Conference champions	Division champions	Wild card berth	League leader

Season	Team	League	Conference	Division	Regular season				Postseason results
Season	Team	League	Conference	Division	Finish	Wins	Losses	Ties	Postseason results
2016	2016	CIF		Northern	5th	3	9	0	
Totals						3	9	0	All-time regular season record (2016)
Totals						0	0	—	All-time postseason record (2016)
Totals						3	9	0	All-time regular season and postseason record (2016)
