= 2016 Champions Indoor Football season =

- League: Champions Indoor Football
- Sport: Indoor football
- Duration: February 27 – June 5

Regular season
- Season champions: Texas Revolution
- Season MVP: Robert Kent (Texas Revolution)

Playoffs
- Northern Division champions: Wichita Force
- Northern Division runners-up: Bloomington Edge
- Southern Division champions: Amarillo Venom
- Southern Division runners-up: Texas Revolution

Champions Bowl II
- Champions: Wichita Force
- Runners-up: Amarillo Venom
- Finals MVP: QB David Olson (WIC)

Champions Indoor Football seasons
- ← 2015 2017 →

The 2016 Champions Indoor Football season was the second season of the CIF. It started on Saturday, February 27, when the Omaha Beef traveled to Iowa, losing to the Sioux City Bandits 43-38, and the San Angelo Bandits traveled to Kansas to play the Dodge City Law, a game won by Dodge City, 59-37. The regular season concluded on Sunday, June 5, when the Sioux City Bandits traveled to Illinois to play the Bloomington Edge. The Edge won, 48-38.

The league champion was the Wichita Force, who defeated the Amarillo Venom 48-45 in Champions Bowl II. The season MVP was Robert Kent of the Texas Revolution, and the Champions Bowl MVP was Wichita's David Olson.

== League changes ==
| New Teams | Bloomington Edge, Chicago Eagles, Mesquite Marshals, Salina Liberty |
| Renamed / Relocated Teams | None |
| Defunct Teams | Salina Bombers |
| Total Teams | 12 |

== Standings ==
Northern Division
| | W | L | PCT | PF | PA |
|---|---|---|---|---|---|
| x-Wichita Force | 10 | 2 | .833 | 593 | 516 |
| y-Bloomington Edge | 7 | 5 | .583 | 546 | 440 |
| y-Sioux City Bandits | 7 | 5 | .583 | 499 | 434 |
| Omaha Beef | 7 | 5 | .583 | 514 | 487 |
| Chicago Eagles | 3 | 9 | .250 | 486 | 584 |
| Salina Liberty | 2 | 10 | .167 | 413 | 575 |
Southern Division
| | W | L | PCT | PF | PA |
| z-Texas Revolution | 10 | 2 | .833 | 814 | 625 |
| y-Amarillo Venom | 8 | 4 | .667 | 642 | 611 |
| y-Dodge City Law | 8 | 4 | .667 | 653 | 523 |
| Duke City Gladiators | 6 | 6 | .500 | 568 | 573 |
| San Angelo Bandits | 2 | 10 | .167 | 537 | 688 |
| Mesquite Marshals | 2 | 10 | .167 | 479 | 688 |

z - clinched top overall seed
x - clinched division title
y - clinched playoff spot

== Playoffs ==
Round 1
Southern Division
3 | Dodge City | 56
2 | Amarillo | 98
Northern Division
3 | Sioux City | 45
2 | Bloomington | 65

Division Championships
2 | Amarillo | 57
1 | Texas | 53
2 | Bloomington | 51
1 | Wichita | 52

Champions Bowl II
S2 | Amarillo | 45
N1 | Wichita | 48
