= Dallas Marshals =

- Founded: 2015
- Folded: 2018
- Team history: Mesquite Marshals (2016); Dallas Marshals (2017–2018)
- Based in: Fair Park Coliseum in Dallas, Texas
- Home arenas: Mesquite Arena (2016–2017); Fair Park Coliseum (2018)
- League: Champions Indoor Football (2016–2018): Southern Division (2016); South Conference (2017–2018)
- Colors: Blue, silver, black, white

Personnel
- Head coach: Larry Hendrix, Jr.
- General manager: Floyd L. Smith IV

The Dallas Marshals were a member of Champions Indoor Football and based in Dallas, Texas. The Marshals were scheduled to play their home games at the Fair Park Coliseum, but all remaining Marshals games were listed as postponed as of April 21, 2018. The team announced it had ceased operations on April 27.

== History ==
The Mesquite Marshals were announced on June 30, 2015, to play out of Mesquite Arena as part of Champions Indoor Football (CIF). They announced their head coach and released their uniforms the following day. Doug Bland, one of the future owners, attended a Texas Revolution game in nearby Allen the previous season and helped found the Marshals. The Marshals finished their inaugural season with a record of 2–10, finishing in sixth place in the CIF Southern Division. After the team's first season, they were renamed to the Dallas Marshals.

In 2017, after their second season, part owner Doug Bland also left the organization to found another team in the CIF, the Quad City Steamwheelers, selling the entire team to Bruce Badgett. Bland also sold Mesquite Arena to another party.

Prior to their third season, on December 21, 2017, the team announced their move to Dallas and the Fair Park Coliseum due to arena lease issues in negotiations with the new arena owners. Before the 2018 season, the Marshals canceled their first home exhibition game for February 17. The played their next two regular season home games on March 3 and 10, however, they canceled their next two for March 24 and April 14 on the day of the games. After the April 14 postponed game, the CIF issued a statement that a decision concerning the team is pending. The Marshals played an away game at the Texas Revolution on April 21, and the Fair Park Coliseum listed all remaining Marshals' games as postponed. On April 27, the team suspended operations for the rest of the season.

== Logos and uniform ==
The Mesquite Marshals unveiled their uniforms on July 1, 2015. The helmets are white with a green stripe running parallel to a gold stripe along with a white facemask. The logo of a Marshal with a star on a hat is depicted over the word "MESQUITE" on top of the word "MARSHALS" in Ewert font. Their home uniforms consist of green jerseys and stripe-free green pants, with red outlining the white numbers in Ewert, along with green and gold stripes along the shoulder pads. The team's road uniforms have white jerseys and blank white pants. Green numbers (Ewert) with a thin layer of gold surrounding them can be seen on the road jerseys.

== Statistics and records ==
=== Season-by-season results ===
League champions	Conference champions	Division champions	Playoff berth	League leader

Season	League	Conference	Division	Regular season				Postseason results
Season	League	Conference	Division	Finish	Wins	Losses	Ties	Postseason results
2016	CIF		Southern	6th	2	10	0	
2017	CIF	South		5th	7	5	0	
2018	CIF	South		Folded	1	5	0	
Totals					10	20	0	All-time regular season record
Totals					0	0	—	All-time postseason record
Totals					10	20	0	All-time regular season and postseason record

== Game results ==
2016

Week	Date	Opponent	Result	Record	Game site
1	February 20	Dallas–Fort Worth Hawks (exhibition)	L 30–31		Mesquite Arena
2	Bye week				
3	March 5	at Dodge City Law	L 42–62	0–1	United Wireless Arena
4	March 12	Sioux City Bandits	W 27–26	1–1	Mesquite Arena
5	March 19	at Texas Revolution	L 31-41	1-2	Allen Event Center
6	March 26	at Duke City Gladiators	L 24-70	1-3	Tingley Coliseum
7	April 2	Texas Revolution	L 32-51	1-4	Mesquite Arena
8	April 9	Amarillo Venom	L 59-60	1-5	Mesquite Arena
9	April 16	at Bloomington Edge	L 35-73	1-6	US Cellular Coliseum
10	Bye week				
11	April 30	at San Angelo Bandits	L 41-54	1-7	Foster Communications Coliseum
12	May 7	Duke City Gladiators	L 43-47	1-8	Mesquite Arena
13	Bye week				
14	May 20	at Texas Revolution	L 43-92	1-9	Allen Event Center
15	May 28	Dodge City Law	L 27-38	1-10	Mesquite Arena
16	June 4	Texas Revolution	W 75-74	2-10	Mesquite Arena

2017

Week	Date	Opponent	Result	Record	Game site
1	March 4	CenTex Cavalry	W 55–37	1-0	Mesquite Arena
2	Bye week				
3	March 18	at Amarillo Venom	L 32-59	1–1	Amarillo Civic Center
4	March 23	at Texas Revolution	L 18–61	1–2	Allen Event Center
5	April 1	at Dodge City Law	L 19-56	1-3	United Wireless Arena
6	April 8	Salina Liberty	W 36-19	2-3	Mesquite Arena
7	April 15	at CenTex Cavalry	W 48-41	3-3	Bell County Expo Center
8	April 22	Texas Revolution	W 73-58	4-3	Mesquite Arena
9	Bye week				
10	May 6	CenTex Cavalry	W 72-47	5-3	Mesquite Arena
11	May 14	at CenTex Cavalry	W 58-52	6-3	Bell County Expo Center
12	May 20	Wichita Force	L 27-34	6-4	Mesquite Arena
13	May 27	at Kansas City Phantoms	L 42-48	6-5	Silverstein Eye Centers Arena
14	June 3	Omaha Beef	W 62-55	7-5	Mesquite Arena

== Notable players ==
See Category:Dallas Marshals players
