= Champions Indoor Football =

Indoor American football league

- Sport: Indoor football
- Founded: 2014
- Founder: Ricky Bertz; Stephanie Tucker; Darlene Jones
- First season: 2015
- Folded: October 5, 2023 (merged with the AFL)
- Commissioner: Mike McCoy
- Country: United States
- Headquarters: Ralston, Nebraska
- Last champion: Omaha Beef (2nd)
- Most titles: Duke City Gladiators; Omaha Beef (2 titles each)
- Broadcaster: YouTube
- Related competitions: Direct: CPIFL, LSFL, AFL; Other: IFL
- Website: http://gocif.net

Champions Indoor Football (CIF) was a professional indoor American football minor league created in 2014 out of the merger between the Champions Professional Indoor Football League (CPIFL) and Lone Star Football League (LSFL), plus one team from the Indoor Football League and two expansion teams.

The league maximum player salary as of 2022 was $200 per game, along with housing, medical and meal expenses. In the past the league used salary cap system which was divided amongst team players, with a minimum per game salary of $75 and a maximum of $300 with no other benefits.

The CIF merged with the new Arena Football League on October 5, 2023. Following several organizational changes, most of its surviving teams now reside in the National Arena League.

== History ==
=== 2014 ===
The merger which formed the CIF was announced on August 22, 2014, after it had been rumored that the CPIFL and LSFL had been in discussions of a possible merger since July 31, 2014.

=== 2015 ===
The Gary Dawgs, originally announced as a charter member of the CIF, rebranded as the Illiana Eagles (later the Chicago Eagles) after a change in ownership and delayed their entry into the league until 2016. On February 21, 2015, the new owners of the New Mexico Stars announced that the team would not enter the league as planned after head coach Dominic Bramante resigned two weeks before the scheduled start of training camp. On March 3, the Albuquerque-based Duke City Gladiators announced they were joining the CIF for the 2015 season and would play an abbreviated 11-game schedule as a partial replacement for the New Mexico Stars.

At the end of the regular season, the four teams (ordered by seeding) that made the postseason were the Sioux City Bandits, Texas Revolution, Wichita Force, and Amarillo Venom. On Thursday, June 11, Texas defeated Wichita 39–27. Two days later, Sioux City beat Amarillo 83–52 leading to Texas facing Sioux City in Champions Bowl I on June 20 in Iowa. At halftime the score was tied 35–35, but a rushing touchdown for eventual Champions Bowl MVP Andrew Prohaska of the Sioux City Bandits led to a final score of 76–61.

=== 2016 ===
The Mesquite Marshals, Salina Liberty, and Bloomington Edge announced their entrance into the league, bringing the total number of teams to 12. The league meetings were on August 19 in Dodge City, Kansas. Many league changes were announced, including Darlene Jones resigning as commissioner, citing personal health-related reasons. Ricky Bertz was then appointed interim commissioner, with the help of Indoor Football League Hall-of-Famer, Tommy Benizio (who was the IFL's commissioner). Stephanie Tucker also joined Bertz and Benizio. Also announced at that time was the Northern/Southern divisional alignment. Later, on January 11, 2016, Bertz stepped down to focus on his team's sales, and Randy Sanders was named the interim commissioner. The updated alignment had each division with six teams. The top three teams reaching the playoffs and the team with the best record in each division received a bye in the first round. The division leader would then play the winners of the 2 vs. 3 seeds playoff game.

=== 2017 ===
At the end of the 2016 season, the Mesquite Marshals changed their name to the Dallas Marshals. Later, the San Angelo Bandits folded but were immediately replaced by an expansion team called the CenTex Cavalry out of Belton, Texas. The CIF continued to expand for the 2017 season by adding the River City Raiders and West Michigan Ironmen from the recently defunct American Indoor Football and two expansion teams in Kansas City Phantoms and Bismarck Bucks. The CIF announced the league would realign from two to four divisions, with two teams each division making the playoffs. In November 2016, the Chicago Eagles announced that they had suspended operations for the 2017 season. Following the Eagles' departure, the River City Raiders left the league, citing the adverse effects on their schedule due to losing a regional opponent, although there had been claims that the Raiders were actually asked to leave due to non-payment of league fees. With the departure of the two teams, the league realigned back into two conferences of seven teams, with four teams per conference making the playoffs.

During the league winter meetings, Bertz returned to his former position of interim league commissioner. Sonny Clark of the Texas Revolution was named as director of operations.

=== 2018 ===
On August 16, 2017, the CIF announced the Quad City Steamwheelers as an expansion team for 2018. On August 30, the league announced the addition of the Sioux Falls Storm from the IFL. The Wichita Falls Nighthawks of the IFL also joined on September 12. On the same day the Nighthawks joined, the Bloomington Edge and West Michigan Ironmen left the CIF for the IFL. The CIF apparently then attempted to sue the IFL, Edge, and Ironmen for leaving the CIF after the two teams had already signed league affiliation agreements with the CIF for 2018. The IFL then threatened to sue the CIF, Storm, and Nighthawks in return despite neither former IFL team signing an affiliation agreement with the IFL for 2018. To avoid disputes, the CIF stated they would not schedule either team. The Storm immediately announced that they would return to the IFL and the Nighthawks had to suspend operations. While the CIF did drop the lawsuit against the IFL, it filed for an injunction against the Edge and Ironmen teams from participating in the IFL for breaking the terms of their signed affiliation agreements. A temporary injunction from participation against the two teams was granted on January 31, 2018.

=== 2019 ===
During the 2018 season, it was announced that after a change in ownership, the West Michigan Ironmen would return to the CIF after playing a season in the semi-professional Midwest Professional Indoor Football. The league also added an expansion team called the Oklahoma Flying Aces in Enid, Oklahoma. During the offseason, the CIF lost the Bismarck Bucks and Quad City Steamwheelers to the IFL. When the 2019 schedule was released, both the West Michigan Ironmen and the Kansas City Phantoms had been removed as members. On May 9, the Texas Revolution folded during the season. At the end of the season, the Duke City Gladiators won their second consecutive championship and then withdrew from the league, eventually joining the IFL.

=== 2020 ===
The league announced it had partnered with the National Arena League (NAL) to create a new league for the 2020 season under a new identity with two conferences: the CIF and NAL. However, it was announced on October 10 that the deal had been postponed, with both leagues playing their own individual schedules in 2020.

The league added the West Texas Warbirds in Odessa, Texas, as an expansion team. The 2020 season was cancelled due to the COVID-19 pandemic without playing a game.

=== 2021 ===
For the 2021 season, the league added the Wyoming Mustangs in Gillette, Wyoming, as an expansion team. In August 2020, the CIF announced a schedule, keeping a four-team playoff format but with a 10-game regular season starting March 12, 2021, and that all games in 2021 would be streamed live on YouTube, officially ending the league's four-year relationship with Pluto TV. However, by February 2021, the effects of the pandemic caused the Amarillo Venom and West Texas Warbirds to back out of the season due to a conflicting schedule at their home arena and play an independent regional schedule instead. On April 1, one week prior to their first game of the season, the Oklahoma Flying Aces withdrew from the season citing drastically increased workers' compensation insurance and were replaced by a reactivated Dodge City Law. On April 5, director of operations Todd Walkenhorst was named the new league commissioner, replacing founder Bertz who had been in the position since 2017.

=== 2022 ===
In August 2021, Walkenhorst was replaced as commissioner by Tommy Benizio, the former commissioner of the Indoor Football League. The league announced expansion teams in the Billings Outlaws, Rapid City Marshals, and the Topeka Tropics. The league also announced a team in Denver, but it did not make the schedule announced on September 30, 2021, along with the Amarillo Venom, Oklahoma Flying Aces, and West Texas Warbirds. On October 1, the Dodge City Law, which had been a temporary replacement for the Oklahoma Flying Aces, was replaced by an expansion team in Dodge City called the Southwest Kansas Storm. Amarillo and West Texas officially left the league and turned their Lone Star Series from the previous season into the Arena Football Association (AFA) in November 2021. By the end of 2021, J. R. Bond, the new owner of the Sioux City Bandits and Topeka Tropics, had been named the commissioner of the league. The Wichita Force were removed from the league in January 2022.

=== 2023 ===
The same eight teams returned for the 2023 season, with the Omaha Beef winning the championship after beating Salina Liberty 50–30 in the Champions Bowl.

After the season ended, founding CIF members Beef and Sioux City Bandits, as well as the Topeka Tropics (who ultimately folded instead after ownership abandoned the team), all announced they were leaving the CIF for a new league, later revealed to be the National Arena League. The CIF then named Mike McCoy as league commissioner. On August 28, 2023, the league added the ICT Regulators based out of Park City, Kansas, in the Wichita area. On August 29, 2023, the Billings Outlaws left the league and was announced as the first official member of the relaunched Arena Football League.

On September 25, 2023, the Gillette Mustangs suspended operations, stating that the remaining CIF members were being absorbed into the AFL and that their arena could not accommodate the additional rebound nets necessary to compete in that league, nor would the league allow any franchise owner to control multiple teams. The three remaining CIF teams held a press conference on October 5, in which they confirmed they would be joining the AFL. McCoy was named the AFL Deputy Commissioner on October 26.

Several of the former CIF teams who joined the AFL indicated that commissioner Lee Hutton had made promises to cover increased travel and salary expenses for playing in the new league, but failed to deliver on them. The Iowa Rampage, a team that had originally planned to join CIF before it merged into the AFL for the 2024 season and was owned by the former owners of the Tropics, folded after one game when the promised compensation never arrived; the Rapid City Marshals, Salina Liberty and Billings Outlaws confirmed that the Rampage's complaints were legitimate but were committed to playing out the season, with the Outlaws hinting at seeking to oust Hutton from the commissioner's post. Hutton was successfully ousted May 14, with Jeff Fisher named his successor. For 2025, the remaining AFL teams played in a newly established league, Arena Football One, which included former CIF remnants Billings, Salina, and Southwest Kansas, after the Regulators ceased operations prior to the 2025 season. Following the 2025 season, Salina and Southwest Kansas also joined the NAL, along with a revived Warbirds, who relocated to Amarillo. The Outlaws, the last remaining CIF team in AF1, suspended operations in November 2025.

== Teams ==
=== Active franchises at the 2023 season ===
Team	Location	Arena	Capacity	Head coach	Founded	Joined	2024 League
Billings Outlaws	Billings, Montana	MetraPark First Interstate Arena	7,000	Kerry Locklin	2021	2022	Arena Football League
Gillette Mustangs	Gillette, Wyoming	Wyoming Center at the CAM-PLEX	4,500	Cedric Walker	2020	2021	Folded by owner in 2024.
Omaha Beef	Ralston, Nebraska	Liberty First Credit Union Arena	4,600	Rayshaun Kizer	2000	2015	National Arena League
Rapid City Marshals	Rapid City, South Dakota	Summit Arena at The Monument	7,500	Dante Dudley	2021	2022	Arena Football League, folded two games into 2024 season
Salina Liberty	Salina, Kansas	Tony's Pizza Events Center	7,583	Heron O'Neal	2015	2016	Arena Football League
Sioux City Bandits	Sioux City, Iowa	Tyson Events Center	6,941	Erv Strohbeen	2000	2015	National Arena League
Southwest Kansas Storm	Dodge City, Kansas	United Wireless Arena	5,300	Brandon Venson	2021	2022	Arena Football League
Topeka Tropics	Topeka, Kansas	Stormont Vail Events Center	10,000	Tyrus Jackson	2022	2022	Folded. Owner and coach moved to AFL as Iowa Rampage

=== Map of teams ===
2023 season CIF team locations

=== Former teams ===
- Amarillo Venom (Amarillo, Texas) — Joined from the Lone Star Football League (LSFL) in 2015 and were members of the CIF from 2015 to 2020. Played the 2021 pandemic-affected season in the Texas-based Lone Star Series before forming the Arena Football Association (AFA) for the 2022 season.
- Billings Outlaws (Billings, Montana) — Named after the original team that played from 2000 to 2010. Played in the CIF in the 2022 and 2023 seasons but joined the relaunched Arena Football League for the 2024 season.
- Bismarck Bucks (Bismarck, North Dakota) — Played in the CIF in 2017 and 2018 but joined the Indoor Football League for the 2019 season.
- Bloomington Edge (Bloomington, Illinois) — Played in the CIF in 2016 and 2017. Rejoined the Indoor Football League for the 2018 season.
- CenTex Cavalry (Belton, Texas) — Played in the CIF in 2017 but suspended operations after one season. Hoped to return for the 2019 season but did not.
- Chicago Eagles (Chicago, Illinois) — Played in the CIF in 2016 but suspended operations after one season with hopes to return for the 2018 season, but did not.
- Dallas Marshals (Dallas/Mesquite, Texas) — Played in the CIF from 2016 until mid-season of 2018, known as the Mesquite Marshals in 2016.
- Dodge City Law (Dodge City, Kansas) – Joined from the CPIFL. After receiving a league penalty towards the end of the 2017 season, the team lost home field advantage in the playoffs. With the team under scrutiny for the penalty and not promptly refunding tickets to the lost home game, the Law left the CIF. Returned for 2021 season under new ownership and the transferred roster of the Oklahoma Flying Aces. The Law were replaced by the expansion Southwest Kansas Storm in 2022.
- Duke City Gladiators (Albuquerque, New Mexico) – Late addition to the CIF in 2015; left for the IFL after winning its second consecutive championship in 2019.
- Gillette Mustangs - suspended operations after the 2023 season, stating that the remaining CIF members were being absorbed into the AFL and that their arena could not accommodate the additional rebound nets necessary to compete in that league, nor would the league allow any franchise owner to control multiple teams.
- Kansas City Phantoms (Independence, Missouri) – Played in the CIF for the 2017 and 2018 season. Removed from team list prior to the 2019 season.
- New Mexico Stars (Rio Rancho, New Mexico) — Joined from the LSFL but left the league prior to the start of the 2015 season following the resignation of the team's head coach. The team was most recently a member of the now defunct AIF.
- Oklahoma Flying Aces (Enid, Oklahoma) – Played in CIF beginning in 2019 but suspended operations prior to 2021 season. Team assets were subsequently sold in 2022.
- Omaha Beef (Ralston, Nebraska) — Founding CIF member announced they were leaving league after the 2023 season and joined the National Arena League.
- Quad City Steamwheelers (Moline, Illinois) — Played in the CIF in 2018 but joined the Indoor Football League for the 2019 season.
- Rapid City Marshals (Rapid City, South Dakota) — Joined the CIF in 2022 and played until 2023. They left to join the revived Arena Football League.
- River City Raiders (St. Charles, Missouri) — Joined from American Indoor Football after the 2016 season. Left the CIF prior to their first season apparently due to non-payment of league fees. However, the Raiders claimed the departure of the Chicago Eagles caused too many adverse effects on their schedule.
- Salina Bombers (Salina, Kansas) — Joined from the CPIFL. Suspended by the league on May 28, 2015, for failing to meet league obligations with two games left to play. The organization folded later the same day. The two remaining games, one home and one away, were both cancelled.
- San Angelo Bandits (San Angelo, Texas) — Played in the CIF in 2015 and 2016 after joining from the LSFL. Folded and replaced by the CenTex Cavalry for 2017.
- Sioux City Bandits (Sioux City, Iowa) — Founding CIF member left the league after the 2023 season and joined the National Arena League.
- Sioux Falls Storm (Sioux Falls, South Dakota) – Joined from the IFL during the 2017 off-season but they could not join the CIF because of a league dispute. Returned to the IFL.
- Texas Revolution (Frisco, Texas) — Joined from the IFL as an inaugural CIF member. Folded during 2019 season.
- Topeka Tropics (Topeka, Kansas) – Joined as an expansion team in 2022; announced they were leaving league after the 2023 season and joined the National Arena League.
- West Michigan Ironmen (Muskegon, Michigan) — Played in the CIF for the 2017 season after joining from American Indoor Football. Joined the Indoor Football League for the 2018 season, the CIF then filed an injunction to keep them from playing in the IFL for 2018. After a change in ownership, the Ironmen were announced to return to the CIF in 2019, however, they were not listed as members when the 2019 schedule was released.
- West Texas Warbirds (Odessa, Texas) — Joined the CIF for the 2020 season, which was then cancelled due to the COVID-19 pandemic. Played the 2021 pandemic-affected season in the Texas-based Lone Star Series before forming the Arena Football Association (AFA) for the 2022 season.
- Wichita Falls Nighthawks (Wichita Falls, Texas) — Joined from the IFL during the 2017 offseason, but they could not join the CIF because of a league dispute.
- Wichita Force (Wichita, Kansas) – Joined as an expansion team for the inaugural season of the CIF in 2015. The Force were removed from the league prior to the 2022 season for not meeting league requirements and would join West Texas and Amarillo (who wouldn't end up playing in 2022) in the AFA

== Champions Bowl ==
When the CPIFL started in 2013, the championship game was known as the "Champions Bowl", so the CIF used the same name for their title game.

Year	Title	Winning team	Losing team	Score
2015	Champions Bowl I	Sioux City Bandits	Texas Revolution	76–61
2016	Champions Bowl II	Wichita Force	Amarillo Venom	48–45
2017	Champions Bowl III	Texas Revolution	Omaha Beef	59–49
2018	Champions Bowl IV	Duke City Gladiators	Sioux City Bandits	31–27
2019	Champions Bowl V	Duke City Gladiators	Salina Liberty	35–29
2020	Season cancelled due to the COVID-19 pandemic			
2021	Champions Bowl VI	Omaha Beef	Salina Liberty	40–39
2022	Champions Bowl VII	Salina Liberty	Omaha Beef	38–34
2023	Champions Bowl VIII	Omaha Beef	Salina Liberty	50–30
