= 2007 Intense Football League season =

The 2007 Intense Football League season was the third season of the Intense Football League (IFL). The league champions were the Louisiana Swashbucklers, who defeated the Corpus Christi Hammerheads in Intense Bowl III on August 11, 2007. The championship game (Intense Bowl III) was the first indoor league championship in history available as a podcast.

== Standings ==
Team	Wins	Losses	Percentage	PF	PA	Home	Away	Streak
Louisiana Swashbucklers	13	1	0.928	799	479	7-0	6-1	Lost 1
Corpus Christi Hammerheads	12	2	0.857	856	636	6-1	6-1	Won 4
Frisco Thunder	8	6	0.572	783	672	4-3	4-3	Lost 3
Odessa Roughnecks	8	6	0.572	712	695	5-2	3-4	Won 2
Katy Ruff Riders	7	7	0.500	722	719	4-3	3-4	Won 1
San Angelo Stampede Express	4	10	0.286	631	822	3-4	1-6	Lost 1
CenTex Barracudas	2	12	0.143	526	751	1-6	1-6	Lost 3
Alaska Wild	2	12	0.143	509	764	2-5	0-7	Won 2

- Green indicates clinched playoff berth
- Grey indicates best league record

== Playoffs ==
Semifinals
3	Frisco	41
2	Corpus Christi	55
4	Odessa	40
1	Louisiana	43

Intense Bowl III
2	Corpus Christi	27
1	Louisiana	46
