= Dennis Gile =

American gridiron football player (born 1981)

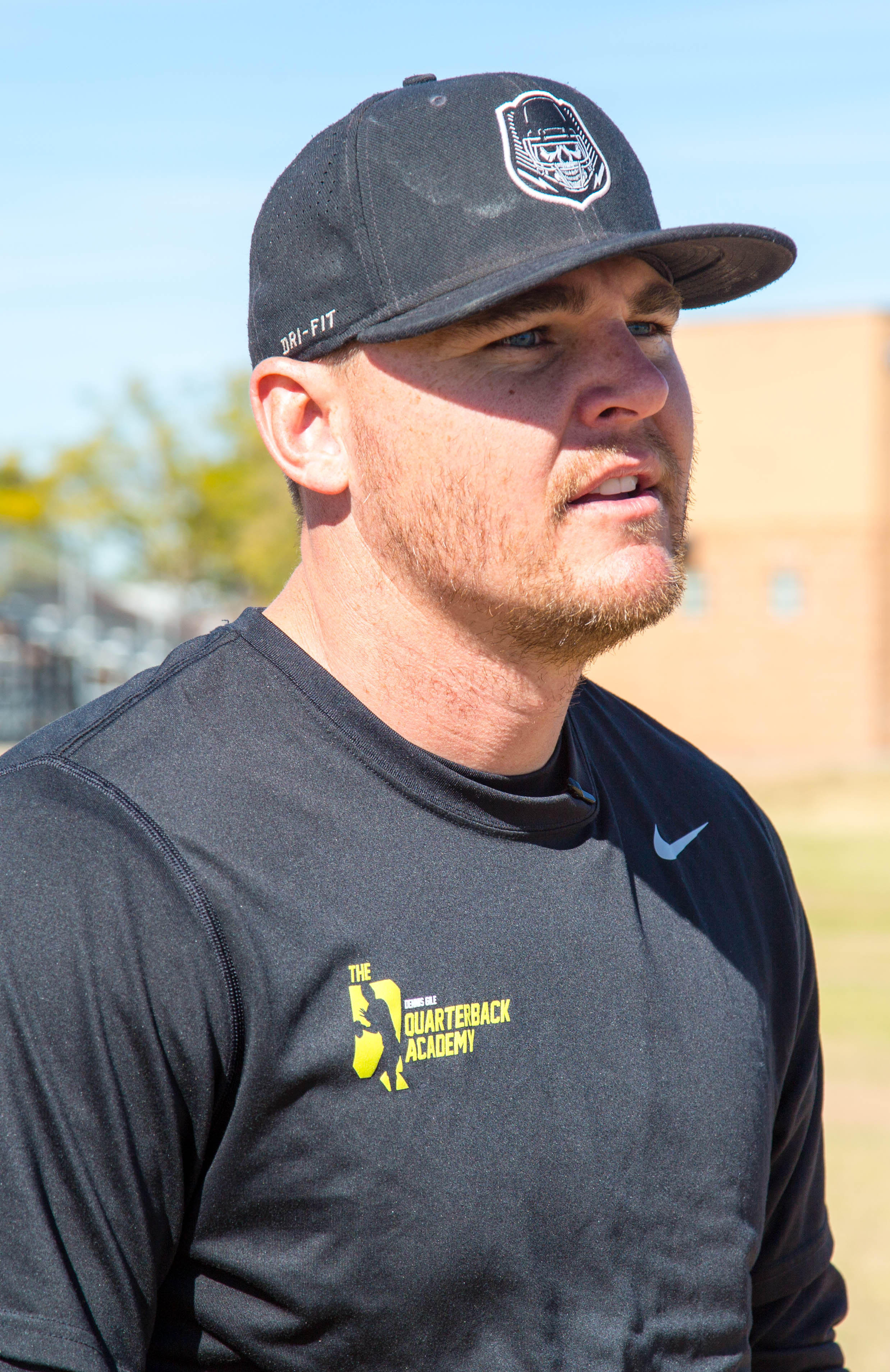

No. 17, 13
- Position: Quarterback

Personal information
- Born: February 17, 1981 (age 45); Phoenix, Arizona, U.S.
- Listed height: 6 ft 2 in (1.88 m)
- Listed weight: 220 lb (100 kg)

Career information
- High school: Cortez (Phoenix)
- College: Central Missouri
- NFL draft: 2003: undrafted

Career history
- Green Bay Blizzard (2004); Saskatchewan Roughriders (2004–2005); Arizona Rattlers (2006); Utah Blaze (2006); Bakersfield Blitz (2007); Odessa Roughnecks (2008–2009); Kansas City Renegades (2013)

Career AFL statistics
- Comp. / Att.: 11 / 25
- Passing yards: 141
- TD–INT: 2–3
- QB rating: 42.67
- Rushing TDs: 1
- Stats at ArenaFan.com
- Stats at CFL.ca (archive)

Dennis Gile (born February 17, 1981) is an American former professional football quarterback who played for the Saskatchewan Roughriders of the Canadian Football League (CFL) and the Arizona Rattlers of the Arena Football League (AFL). He played college football at Central Missouri State University. He was also a member of the Green Bay Blizzard, Utah Blaze, Bakersfield Blitz, Odessa Roughnecks and Kansas City Renegades. Gile has worked as a quarterbacks coach after his playing career.

== Early life ==
Dennis is a native of Arizona where he was a first-team All-Arizona quarterback for Cortez High School in Phoenix, Arizona.

== College career ==
Gile was a two-year starter for the Central Missouri Mules from 2001 to 2002, passing for 4,741 yards and 40 touchdowns. He also rushed for 285 yards and three touchdowns.

== Professional career ==
After his college career, Gile had a tryout with the New England Patriots but was not signed. He played for the Green Bay Blizzard of the af2 in 2004. Gile was released by the Blizzard on May 6, 2004. He played for the Saskatchewan Roughriders of the Canadian Football League from 2004 to 2005. He signed with the Arizona Rattlers of the Arena Football League (AFL) on January 9, 2006. He was signed by the AFL's Utah Blaze on April 5, 2006. Gile was released by the Blaze on April 10, 2006. He played for the Bakersfield Blitz of the af2 in 2007. He played for the Odessa Roughnecks from 2008 to 2009. He threw for 2,027 yards and 41 touchdowns while also recording six rushing touchdowns in 2008. He also led the Roughnecks to a 7–7 regular season record and a playoff victory over the Frisco Thunder. Gile was named to the 2008 IFL All-Star Team. He played for the Kansas City Renegades in 2013.

== Dennis Gile Quarterback Academy ==
In 2007, Gile established the "Dennis Gile Quarterback Academy", which is based out of Scottsdale, Arizona.
