= Tommy Jones (quarterback) =

American gridiron football player and coach (born 1979)

No. 4
- Position: Quarterback

Personal information
- Born: August 3, 1979 (age 47); Eaton, Ohio, U.S.
- Listed height: 6 ft 5 in (1.96 m)
- Listed weight: 240 lb (109 kg)

Career information
- High school: Eaton (OH)
- College: Indiana
- NFL draft: 2003: undrafted

Career history

Playing
- Cincinnati Bengals (2003)*; Calgary Stampeders (2004); Nashville Kats (2004)*; Columbus Destroyers (2005)*; Odessa Roughnecks (2006); Mississippi MudCats (2007–2008); El Paso Generals (2009); West Texas Roughnecks (2010); Saginaw Sting (2011–2012); Dayton Sharks (2013–2014)
- * Offseason or practice squad member only

Coaching
- Saginaw Sting Offensive coordinator (2011); Dayton Sharks Offensive coordinator (2013)

Awards and highlights
- Intense Bowl champion (2006); Ultimate Bowl champion (2011); Ultimate Bowl I MVP (2011); CIFL champion (2012); CIFL MVP (2012); 2× CIFL Offensive Player of the Year (2012, 2013); UIFL Offensive Player of the Year (2011); Second-team All-IFL (2009); 2× Second Team All-CIFL (2013, 2014); AIFA All-Star (2007)

Career CFL statistics
- Completions: 85
- Attempts: 167
- Yards: 1,168
- Touchdowns: 7
- Interceptions: 9

Thomas Jones (born August 3, 1979) is an American former professional football quarterback.

After a standout prep career at Eaton High School where he played football, basketball and baseball, Jones continued his football career at Indiana University. After taking a red-shirt his freshman year, Jones split first team practice reps with Antwaan Randle El. Head Coach Cam Cameron ultimately decided on Randle-El, and Jones appeared in just 3 games as a red-shirt freshman. During his sophomore season, there was once again training camp talk of Jones starting over Randle-El, and once again Jones was named the backup, playing 6 games. His junior season, he was named the starting quarterback and Randle-El moved to wide receiver. Jones completed 18 of 31 passes and had one touchdown, but was benched the following week as the offense didn't take off as well had Cameron had hoped. Jones was then injured during week 4 and didn't play in a game the rest of the season. During his senior season, the Hoosiers were under new head coach Gerry DiNardo, and Jones was named the starter out of fall camp. Jones started the first 7 games of the season, throwing for 879 yards with 9 touchdowns and 7 interceptions. He was then benched in favor of Gibran Hamdan.

After going undrafted in the 2003 NFL draft, Jones was signed by the Cincinnati Bengals and participated in mini-camp and training camp before being released. He then signed with the Calgary Stampeders of the Canadian Football League, where he started 6 games, throwing for 1,168 yards with 7 touchdowns and 9 interceptions.

Following his release from the Stampeders, Jones turned to the Arena Football League, catching on with the Nashville Kats and the Columbus Destroyers, but never seeing the field for either team.

Jones then turned his attention to indoor football, signing with the Odessa Roughnecks of the Intense Football League. Jones shined in his first season of indoor football, throwing 100 touchdown passes and leading the Roughnecks to a 97–56 victory in Intense Bowl II. The following year, Jones signed with the Mississippi MudCats of the American Indoor Football Association. Jones again threw over 100 touchdowns, while also being named to the All-Star team. In 2009, Jones signed with the El Paso Generals, throwing for 66 touchdowns and 3,158 yards. In 2010, Jones returned to the Roughnecks, as they were now member of the Indoor Football League. In 2011, Jones signed with the Saginaw Sting, where he would lead the Sting to an Ultimate Bowl Championship, while winning Offensive Player of the Year honors as well as Ultimate Bowl I MVP. Jones re-signed with the Sting in 2012, as they transitioned into the Continental Indoor Football League. The Sting went undefeated, winning the 2012 CIFL Championship Game over the Dayton Silverbacks. Jones won the CIFL MVP and Offensive Player of the Year Awards. In, 2013 Jones signed with the expansion Dayton Sharks, where he was named their starting quarterback and offensive coordinator.

== Early life ==
Born the son of Tom and Meg Jones, Tommy attended Eaton High School, in Eaton, Ohio, where he was a member of the baseball, basketball and football teams. As a football player he passed for 1,185 yards and 19 touchdowns as a sophomore, 1,022 yards and 14 touchdowns as a junior and completed 88 of 174 passes for 1,532 yards and 18 touchdowns and rushed 67 times for 586 yards and 10 touchdowns as a senior. He was 25–5 as a starter during this career, going 9–1 his senior year in 1997. After his senior season he was named a first-team Southwestern Buckeye League selection, the Richmond, IN Palladium-Item Player-of-the-Year as well as earned postseason All-America honors and was named as one of the top 90 players in the country by Tom Lemming's Prep Football Report. As a basketball player, he averaged over 20 points per game as a junior and senior. As a baseball player he was a shortstop.

== College career ==
After his graduation, Jones chose to continue his football career at Indiana University on scholarship, playing for Cam Cameron. He was a General Studies major. He sat out the 1998 season as he redshirted.

In 1999, Jones saw some first team reps in spring practice with, the 1998 Big Ten Conference Freshman of the Year in 1998, Antwaan Randle El taking reps at wide receiver. When questioned about if he would actually play Jones at quarterback Cameron stated, "Get the best players on the field. If that means Jones and Randle El, so be it." Jones played in just three games, and completed 4 of 9 passes for 77 yards, including a 47-yard completion at Wisconsin. His season ended when he chipped a bone and sustained ligament damage to his right index finger during warm-ups prior to the North Carolina game.

In 2000, Jones was once again talked about as replacing Randle-El at quarterback, but when the season came, Jones was once again in a reserve role. Jones saw action as a back-up to Randle-El, and completed 6 of 16 pass for 57 yards and one interception. His best game of the season came at Northwestern, when he completed both passes he threw for 43 yards, including a 27-yard completion. He attempted five passes against both Cincinnati and Wisconsin. He also saw action against NC State, Michigan and Penn State.

During his junior season in 2001, head coach Cam Cameron decided to move Randle-El to wide receiver, and let Jones become the starting quarterback. He opened the season as the starting quarterback against NC State, completing 18 of 31 passes for 163 yards and one touchdown. He also saw action on the kickoff return team. He did not play after week four of the season as he was sidelined with tendonitis in his throwing shoulder.

For his senior season in 2002, under new head coach Gerry DiNardo, he completed 75 of 152 passes for 879 yards and nine touchdowns in seven games before being replaced by Gibran Hamdan.

=== Statistics ===
Through the end of the 2002 season, Jones's college statistics are as follows:

		Passing							Rushing		
Season	Team	Rating	Att	Comp	Pct	Yds	TD	INT	Att	Yds	TD
1999	Indiana	94.1	9	4	44.4	77	0	1	3	-8	0
2000	Indiana	54.9	16	6	37.5	57	0	1	4	20	0
2001	Indiana	112.9	31	18	58.1	163	1	0	4	-6	0
2002	Indiana	108.2	152	75	49.3	879	9	7	25	-19	0
	Totals	104.2	208	103	49.5	1,176	10	9	36	-13	0

== Professional career ==
He was signed on May 12, 2003, as an undrafted free agent, and participated in Cincinnati Bengals mini-camp & training camp, but was later released on August 25, 2003, due to reduction to 65-man roster.

After sitting out the 2003 season, he was signed on May 18, 2004, by the Calgary Stampeders. He appeared in eight games, starting six and threw for 1,237 yards, seven touchdowns and completed 52% of his passes. Jones was later invited to private workouts with both the Seattle Seahawks and the Buffalo Bills following the end of the CFL regular season.->

Jones joined the Nashville Kats of the Arena Football League in the winter of 2004, he attended training camp with the Kats, but failed to make the team.

Jones signed to play arena football for the Columbus Destroyers, but didn't appear in any games.

Jones was finally given a chance to start in every game by the Odessa Roughnecks during the 2006 season, and led the club to their only championship (Intense Football League) after going 12–2 during the regular season. Jones led the offense by posting 100 touchdown passes during the season, and led the club to a recording-setting 97–56 win over Corpus Christi Hammerheads in Intense Bowl II.

After his great indoor success, he then came to the Mississippi MudCats in 2007 as their starting quarterback, where he completed 63% of his passes, threw 102 touchdowns, setting a league record with the AIFA and he rushed for 12 touchdowns. Jones was voted to the AIFA All Star Team in 2007 and was re-signed for a second season with the MudCats.

Jones led the El Paso Generals to a 12–2 regular season record in '09 including the Lone Star Division Championship. Jones led the IFL with 3,158 passing yards in 2009 and finished second among all quarterbacks with 66 touchdown passes. Jones became the only quarterback to eclipse the 3,000-yard passing mark in 2009 and he led the league with 225.6 passing yards averaged a game. Jones posted 450 passing yards with nine touchdown passes in two games played during the 2009 IFL playoffs and he would lead the Generals to an appearance in the Intense Conference Championship Game against Billings. Jones capped off the 2009 season by being named to the All-IFL Second Team.

Jones signed with the West Texas Roughnecks for the 2010 season, this time the team had moved to the Indoor Football League after the Intense Football League folded. He played in 13 games passing for 2,487 yards and 42 touchdowns. The Roughnecks lost in the first round of the IFL playoffs.

For the 2011 season, Jones signed with the Saginaw Sting of the newly formed Ultimate Indoor Football League. Jones went on to lead the league in touchdowns (76) and pass efficiency rating (107.1). He guided the Sting to the first ever Ultimate Bowl championship, and the same night he was also honored as the league's Offensive Player of the Year. Once Saginaw's 86–69 victory over the Eastern Kentucky Drillers was complete, Jones picked up another trophy, this one as the Ultimate Bowl's Most Valuable Player. The veteran quarterback went 25-of-36 for 346 yards and a UIFL record 10 touchdowns in Ultimate Bowl I. On January 18, 2012, it was announced that Jones had re-signed with the Sting for their 2012 season, but the team had left the UIFL and re-joined the Continental Indoor Football League. Jones went on to lead the Sting to a perfect 8–0 regular season record, setting the CIFL for points in a game (91) along the way. The team played in the CIFL Championship Game, where they defeated the Dayton Silverbacks 35–7. Jones led the Sting's offense as he connected on 22 of his 35 passes for 233 yards and five touchdowns. Following the conclusion of the season, Jones was named the CIFL's MVP as well as the league's Offensive Player of the Year.

Jones signed with the Dayton Sharks for the 2013 season. Jones was named the team's starting quarterback, as well as the offensive coordinator.
