= 2008 Intense Football League season =

The 2008 Intense Football League season was the fourth and final season of the Intense Football League. The regular season began on Saturday, March 1, 2008 and ended on Saturday, June 28. The league champions were the Louisiana Swashbucklers, who defended their title by defeating the Corpus Christi Hammerheads in Intense Bowl IV on July 28, 2008.

Following Intense Bowl IV, the IFL champion, the Louisiana Swashbucklers, played against the UIF champion, the Sioux Falls Storm, on Saturday, August 2 in the inaugural National Indoor Bowl.

== Standings ==
Team	Wins	Losses	Percentage	PF	PA	Home	Away	Streak
Louisiana Swashbucklers	14	0	1.000	947	385	7-0	7-0	Won 14
Corpus Christi Hammerheads	10	4	0.714	808	663	6-1	4-3	Lost 1
CenTex Barracudas	8	6	0.571	746	755	6-1	2-5	Lost 2
Odessa Roughnecks	7	7	0.500	712	752	6-1	1-6	Won 2
Frisco Thunder	6	8	0.429	615	702	5-2	1-6	Lost 4
Alaska Wild	5	9	0.357	643	611	5-2	0-7	Lost 2
Katy Ruff Riders	5	9	0.357	722	845	4-3	1-6	Lost 2
San Angelo Stampede Express	5	9	0.357	531	732	4-3	1-6	Won 4
Fairbanks Grizzlies	3	11	0.214	578	857	3-4	0-7	Won 1

- Green indicates clinched playoff berth
- Grey indicates best league record

== Playoffs ==
Belton, TX	Corpus Christi, TX
6	Alaska	18
3	CenTex	34
3	CenTex	71	Lake Charles, LA
2	Corpus Christi	64
Intense Football League
Odessa, TX	2	Corpus Christi	35
Lake Charles, LA
1	Louisiana	66
5	Frisco	33	Intense Football League Championship
4	Odessa	57
4	Odessa	67	Sioux Falls, SD
1	Louisiana	59
Wild Card playoffs
Divisional playoffs
St. Charles, MO	IFL1	Louisiana	42
Bloomington, IL
UIF1	Sioux Falls	54
3	Sioux City	33	National Indoor Bowl
2	RiverCity	23
2	RiverCity	37	Sioux Falls, SD
1	Bloomington	52
United Indoor Football
Billings, MT	E1	Bloomington	35
Sioux Falls, SD
W1	Sioux Falls	40
3	Omaha	30	United Indoor Football Championship
2	Billings	44
2	Billings	47
1	Sioux Falls	46
