= 2004 Intense Football League season =

The 2004 Intense Football League season was the first season of the Intense Football League. The league champions were the Amarillo Dusters, who defeated the Lubbock Lone Stars in Intense Bowl I.

== Standings ==
| Team | Wins | Losses | Percentage |
|---|---|---|---|
| Amarillo Dusters | 13 | 3 | 0.812 |
| Lubbock Lone Stars | 9 | 7 | 0.562 |
| Odessa Roughnecks | 9 | 7 | 0.562 |
| San Angelo Stampede | 9 | 7 | 0.562 |
| Corpus Christi Hammerheads | 8 | 8 | 0.500 |
| El Paso Rumble | 0 | 16 | 0.000 |

- Green indicates clinched playoff berth
- Black indicates best regular season record

== Playoffs ==
Semifinals
4 | San Angelo | 29
1 | Amarillo | 41
3 | Odessa | 54
2 | Lubbock | 61

Intense Bowl I
2 | Lubbock | 47
1 | Amarillo | 62
