= Carlese Franklin =

American football player (born 1985)

No. 4
- Position: Wide receiver

Personal information
- Born: February 23, 1985 (age 41); Kentwood, Louisiana, U.S.
- Listed height: 5 ft 11 in (1.80 m)
- Listed weight: 190 lb (86 kg)

Career information
- High school: Kentwood (LA)
- College: McNeese State
- NFL draft: 2008: undrafted

Career history
- Louisiana Swashbucklers (2008); Tulsa Talons (2009–2010); New Orleans VooDoo (2011–2012); Cleveland Gladiators (2012–2013); Orlando Predators (2014)*; New Orleans VooDoo (2014–2015)
- * Offseason or practice squad member only

Career AFL statistics
- Receptions: 321
- Receiving yards: 4,025
- Receiving touchdowns: 64
- Return yards: 1,368
- Return touchdowns: 1
- Stats at ArenaFan.com

Carlese Franklin (born February 23, 1985) is an American former professional football wide receiver. Franklin played college football at McNeese State University. He signed as an undrafted free agent with the Kansas City Chiefs in 2008.

== Early life ==
Born the son of Alfred and Veronica Stewart, Carlese attended Kentwood High School in Kentwood, Louisiana. Played both quarterback and defensive back, where he named All-State and All-District. He passed for 1,500 yards and 14 touchdowns, and rushed for 978 yards with a 10.5 rushing average as senior to lead his team to the state championship game. Passed for over 3,000 yards and 24 touchdowns, while rushing for over 1,800 yards and 18 touchdowns in his prep career. Also a track & field standout (javelin and high jump) and helped team to two state titles. All-State in basketball as a guard.

== College career ==
Franklin continued his athletic and academic career at McNeese State University, where he majored in Psychology and lettered all four seasons for the Cowboys, winning three Southland Conference Championships. Was named All-Southland Conference all four seasons, garnering First Team honors as a junior and senior as a wide receiver also named First Team All- Louisiana senior season. Had a total of 111 receptions for 1,696 yards (15.3 yards/catch) and 10 touchdowns for his collegiate career. Best season came as a senior with 50 receptions for 823 yards. He was also a member of track and field team as well that qualified for NCAA Regionals in 2005. Among the Southland Conference's best in the javelin, placing in the Top-10 as a senior in the event.

== Professional career ==
=== Kansas City Chiefs ===
He signed as an undrafted free agent after the 2008 NFL draft with the Kansas City Chiefs. He was cut before the season started.

=== Louisiana Swashbucklers ===
In 2008, he played with the Louisiana Swashbucklers of the Intense Football League.

=== Tulsa Talons ===
In 2009, Franklin signed with the Tulsa Talons of af2. He would come into his own in his 2nd season, as he was 2nd on the team in receiving yards and touchdowns.

=== New Orleans VooDoo ===
In 2011, Franklin returned to Louisiana, when he signed with the New Orleans VooDoo.

=== Cleveland Gladiators ===
In May 2012, the VooDoo traded Franklin to the Cleveland Gladiators for future considerations.

=== Orlando Predators ===
On January 24, 2014, Franklin was traded to the Orlando Predators in exchange for future considerations.

=== Return to VooDoo ===
On March 26, 2014, Franklin was assigned to the VooDoo. He was placed on reassignment on December 11, 2014. Franklin remained with the VooDoo during the 2015 season.
