= 2006 Intense Football League season =

The 2006 Intense Football League season was the second season of the Intense Football League, since the league temporarily suspended operations in 2005. The league champions were the Odessa Roughnecks, who defeated the Corpus Christi Hammerheads in Intense Bowl II.

== Standings ==
Team	Wins	Losses	Percentage
Odessa Roughnecks	12	2	0.857
Corpus Christi Hammerheads	9	5	0.643
Louisiana Swashbucklers	8	6	0.571
CenTex Barracudas	8	6	0.571
San Angelo Stampede Express	3	11	0.214
Laredo Lobos	2	12	0.143

- Green indicates clinched playoff berth
- Black indicates best regular season record

== Playoffs ==
Semifinals
3	CenTex	49
2	Corpus Christi	66
4	Louisiana	50
1	Odessa	53

Intense Bowl II
2	Corpus Christi	56
1	Odessa	97
