= James Brown (quarterback) =

American football player and coach (born 1975)

Profile
- Positions: Quarterback, wide receiver, defensive back

Personal information
- Born: May 17, 1975 (age 51); Beaumont, Texas, U.S.
- Listed height: 6 ft 0 in (1.83 m)
- Listed weight: 200 lb (91 kg)

Career information
- High school: West Brook (Beaumont, Texas)
- College: Texas (1993–1997)
- NFL draft: 1998: undrafted

Career history

Playing
- 1998: BC Lions*
- 1999: Texas Terminators
- 2000–2001: Nashville Kats
- 2002: Georgia Force*
- 2002: Scottish Claymores
- 2002: San Jose SaberCats
- 2003: Frankfurt Galaxy
- 2003–2004: Georgia Force
- 2008: CenTex Barracudas
- * Offseason or practice squad member only

Coaching
- 2004–2006: Hyde Park Baptist HS (OC)
- 2010–2014: Lamar University (RB)
- 2014–???: Houston KIPP Sunnyside (HC)
- 2025–Present: TWA College (OC)

Awards and highlights
- SWC Offensive Player of the Year (1995); First-team All-SWC (1995); 1995 Southwest Conference Champion; 1996 Big 12 Champion; Blue-Gray All Star Game MVP (1997); World Bowl XI Champion; Arena Bowl XVI Champion; 1994 Sun Bowl Champion; 1999 IPFL Offensive MVP; 2008 IFL All-Star

James Brown (born May 17, 1975) is an American former football quarterback, wide receiver, defensive back and coach. He was the starting quarterback of the Texas Longhorns from 1994 to 1997. At the time, he was only the second black quarterback to guide Texas through an entire season (after Donnie Little in 1978), and is credited for "opening doors" for future black quarterbacks at Texas, such as Casey Thompson and Vince Young. After graduating, he had a long professional career in the Canadian Football League, Indoor Professional Football League (IPFL), NFL Europe (NFLE), Arena Football League (AFL) and Intense Football League (IFL). He played in championship games for the IPFL, NFLE and AFL winning both a World Bowl and ArenaBowl. He was the 1999 IPFL Offensive MVP and a 2008 IFL All-star.

== Early life ==
Brown was born in Beaumont, Texas to J. W. Brown and Julia Brown. He played high school football at West Brook Senior High School where in 1992 he was TSWA 5A 2nd Team All-State and an AP Honorable Mention All-State his senior year. He came to UT as the state's top quarterback prospect.

== Longhorns career ==
After redshirting in 1993, Brown entered the 1994 season as the backup to Shea Morenz. After Morenz was injured during a loss to Colorado, Brown took over the quarterback duties the following week against Oklahoma and led the Longhorns to a come-from-behind win. Morenz reclaimed the starting position the next week against Rice, but after Texas was stunningly upset in that game, Brown and Morenz proceeded to share the quarterback duties. In the 4th quarter of the Texas A&M game, which Texas lost, Morenz suffered a shoulder injury and left the game and Brown became the Longhorns starting quarterback for the final game of the season. In the Sun Bowl, Brown threw for 196 yards and ran for 43 more in a game Texas won over North Carolina in a 35–31 4th quarter comeback, thus solidifying his position as the starter. This became more apparent when Morenz decided to play professional baseball rather than return to the Longhorns.

In 1995, Brown started all but one game, due to an injury, and led Texas to the final SWC Championship, a 10–2–1 record, and a berth in the 1996 Sugar Bowl where Texas lost to Virginia Tech 28–10. He became the first Longhorn quarterback in 20 years to earn first-team All-Southwest Conference (SWC) honors (Marty Akins, 1975) and was also named SWC Offensive Player of the Year. In addition he was named the team's MVP.

In 1996, Brown started every game. After four early losses, including the Virginia game where he was pulled for Richard Walton, Brown guided Texas through a late-season surge that was capped off by an upset of defending national champion number 3 Nebraska in the inaugural Big 12 championship game. That was followed by a trip to a second straight Bowl Alliance game as the Longhorns went to the 1997 Fiesta Bowl. Though Brown threw for 254 yards in that game, Texas lost to Penn State 38–15.

Brown's senior season in 1997 started with him injuring his ankle in the Rutgers game. He was replaced by Walton in that game and again the next week against UCLA. Texas lost 66–3 and the season fell apart. Brown threw twice as many interceptions that season as touchdowns. Late in the season, he was pulled for Walton in the Colorado game after throwing 4 interceptions. Texas went 4–7 and head coach John Mackovic was fired when it was over. During a trip to the Blue-Gray All Star game he was the game's MVP.

Brown finished with 30 Longhorn records, including passing yards (7,638), total offense (8,049) and touchdown passes (53). His record as a starter was 25–13–1.

=== Roll left ===
In the aforementioned Big 12 title game against #3 Nebraska, the Longhorns were leading 30–27 with 2:31 left in the fourth quarter, but faced fourth-and-1 at their own 28. Texas coach John Mackovic decided to gamble for the first down, calling "roll left", a staple of the team's goal-line offense. The play called for Brown to fake to running back Priest Holmes and roll to his left. Before the play, Mackovic told him on the sidelines "come to run", intending for Brown to run for the first down, but the play included an option to pass if it was there. Brown took the snap, but as he rolled out, he saw his tight end Derek Lewis behind Nebraska's defense. He stopped and threw the ball to the wide-open Lewis, who ran down the sideline for a 61-yard gain to the Nebraska 10-yard line. The Longhorns sealed the win and Big 12 title when Holmes ran for a touchdown on the next play.

After several years in pro football, he returned to Texas for his final semester and completed his coursework in sport management. He received his degree in December 2001.

=== Records ===
- UT–Passing yards in a game (397), surpassed by Major Applewhite in 1998
- UT-Passing yards, season (2,468), surpassed by Applewhite in 1999
- UT-Passing yards, career (7,638), surpassed by Applewhite in 2001
- UT-Total offense, career (8,049), surpassed by Applewhite in 2001
- UT-Touchdown passes by a freshman, game (5), broke his own record, surpassed by Colt McCoy in 2006
- UT-Touchdown passes, game (5) tied by Chris Simms in 2001, surpassed by McCoy in 2006
- UT-Touchdown passes, career (53), surpassed by Applewhite in 2001
- UT-Completions, season (196), surpassed by Applewhite in 1999
- UT-Lowest percentage of passes had intercepted (minimum 50 passes), season (2.1%), surpassed by Richard Walton in 1996
- UT-Lowest percentage of passes intercepted (minimum 300 passes), career (3.7%), surpassed by Applewhite in 2001
- **UT-Highest completion percentage by a freshman, game (81.5%)**
- **UT-Highest completion percentage by a freshman, season (69.6%)**
- UT-Highest completion percentage, season (69.6%), surpassed by McCoy in 2008
- **UT-Fastest to 1,000 yards in a single season (4 games), tied with McCoy, Applewhite and David Ash**
- UT-Fastest to 2,000 yards in a single season (8 games) tie with Peter Gardere, surpassed by Applewhite in 1999
- UT-Consecutive 300 yard games (2), surpassed by McCoy in 2009
- UT-Most 300 yard total offense games, season (2), tied Donnie Little, tied by Ricky Williams, surpassed by Applewhite
- UT–-Most 300 yard total offense games, career (8), tied by Applewhite, surpassed by Vince Young

Bold means active.

=== College statistics ===
- 1994: 80/115 for 1,037 yards with 12 touchdowns vs two interceptions. 127 yards and two rushing touchdowns.
- 1995: 163/322 for 2,447 yards with 19 touchdowns vs 12 interceptions. 136 yards and one rushing touchdown.
- 1996: 170/299 for 2,468 yards with 17 touchdowns vs 12 interceptions. 119 yards and two rushing touchdowns.
- 1997: 133/267 for 1,676 yards with five touchdowns vs 11 interceptions. 29 yards and one rushing touchdown.

== Professional career ==
=== CFL ===
Considered too small at 6 ft 0 in (1.83 m), overlooked because of the turmoil during his senior season and hurt by the coaching change after his last season, Brown was not picked up by any National Football League teams. His first foray into professional football came when Brown signed with the British Columbia Lions of the Canadian Football League in 1998, but he was cut after the preseason.

=== IPFL ===
He then signed with and led the Texas Terminators to the Indoor Professional Football League (IPFL) championship game in 1999. He was named the IPFL offensive player of the year and was an MVP nominee. His performance earned him a spot in the Arena Football where he played on and off again for five seasons.

=== Arena Football ===
In 2000 and 2001, he was the backup quarterback and a defensive back with the Nashville Kats, and with the Kats went to the ArenaBowl both seasons. In ArenaBowl XIV, Brown replaced QB Andy Kelly late in the game after Kelly was injured. Brown threw a 45-yard TD pass and a successful 2 point conversion pass to tie the game with 6 minutes left, but the Kats could not hang on for the victory.

The next season, he was signed, and then waived, by the Georgia Force before the 2002 season started.

=== NFLE ===
After being cut by the Force, he was signed by his old offensive coordinator at Texas, Gene Dahlquist, to be the backup quarterback for the Scottish Claymores of the NFL Europe. There he won his only start, replacing an injured Scott Dreisbach, in 2002.

=== Arena Football (second stint) ===
In July of the 2002 season, he was signed to the roster of the San Jose Sabercats after Mark Grieb was injured. He was the 3rd string backup to John Dutton for San Jose's run to victory in ArenaBowl XVI, but did not play and was placed on the injured reserve on August 2nd, before the end of the season. Dutton had been Brown's backup at Texas and had transferred to Nevada after the 1995 season when it became clear he would not win the starting position.

In 2003, Brown was re-signed by the Georgia Force. He only played in two games for Georgia that season, but he started the second game in place of the injured Donnie Davis and led the team to an upset win over San Jose, becoming the game's MVP. Three days later he left the team to join the Scottish Claymores, but was assigned to the Frankfurt Galaxy as a free agent.

=== NFLE (second stint) ===
As the co-starting quarterback for the Galaxy along with Quinn Gray, Brown led the Galaxy to a 6–4 record, the division title and the league championship in World Bowl XI. World Bowl XI was his last game in the NFL Europe.

=== Arena Football (third stint) ===
He was released by Georgia before the 2004 Arena League season, but then re-signed by them halfway through the 2004 season as a WR and DB. He was used sparingly, recording just one catch for 8 yards, 4 tackles and an interception in the last three games of the season.

=== Intense Football League ===
After several years away from playing, he was preparing in 2008 to play for the All American Football League which never materialized and was then signed by the CenTex Barracudas of the Intense Football League as a mid-season replacement in late April. He led the team to six wins in eight games and was the offensive player of the week in week 9 of the season. He led the team to the playoffs, their only playoff win and a spot in the league semifinals, while also making the IFL All-Star Team.

== Coaching career ==
Brown started his coaching career as the quarterback coach and offensive coordinator at Hyde Park Baptist High School from 2002 to 2006. After the CenTex Barracudas folded in 2008, Brown went back to coaching, this time at Lamar University in Beaumont, Texas where he became the running backs coach. In addition, during his time with San Jose, he was the player coach.

In 2014, he left Lamar to become the head coach and athletic director at Houston's KIPP Sunnyside High School. He left the job by 2024.

In 2025, he was hired as the offensive coordinator at TWA College in Austin under head coach, and former teammate, Shon Mitchell.
