= Alaska Wild =

Former indoor American football team

Logo

General information
- Founded: 2006
- Folded: 2010
- Headquartered: Sullivan Arena in Anchorage, Alaska
- Colors: Silver, red, black, white
- Mascot: Striker

Personnel
- Owner: Charles Matthews
- Head coach: Carl Sundquist

Team history
- Alaska Wild (2007–2010)

Home fields
- Sullivan Arena (2007–2010)

League / conference affiliations
- Intense Football League (2007–2008) Indoor Football League (2009–2010): Intense Conference (2009–2010); Pacific Division (2009); Pacific North (2010)

Championships
- League championships: 0; 0
- Conference championships: 0; 0
- Division championships: 0; 0

Playoff appearances (1)
- 2008

The Alaska Wild were a professional indoor football team based in Anchorage, Alaska. The team was a member of the Pacific North Division of the Intense Conference of the Indoor Football League (IFL), after originally being an expansion member of the Intense Football League in 2007. The Alaska Wild played their home games in the Sullivan Arena in Anchorage. The team suspended operations after nine games of the 2010 season.

== History ==
On March 20, 2006, Alaska Professional Sports, Inc. (APS) was formed by Weatherholt & Associates, LLC's President David W. Weatherholt and the company was incorporated in the State of Alaska on May 4, 2006 with the goal of bringing professional level sports including professional football to the state of Alaska. At that time, Alaska was the only state in the United States that did not have football played above the high school level or basketball played above the collegiate level. The original APS Business Plan was written by David Weatherholt during the winter and spring of 2005–2006. In 2007, the Alaska Wild Indoor Football Team began play and APS purchased an indoor flag football league from Rick Quattlebaum and formed a development league called the Alaska Indoor Flag Football League (AIFFL). APS was also in talks with Mikal Duilio, founder of the International Basketball League (IBL) to form a professional basketball team to be called the Anchorage Ice.

During the business planning process, Weatherholt was in contact with Arena Football's af2 league headquartered in Chicago about joining that league. The original goal was to join the af2, and on April 25, 2006, Weatherholt paid the application fee for admission to the league. The next step was to secure funding and form the team. The goal was to incorporate APS, which took place on May 4, 2006, and to raise equity capital by selling common stock in the newly formed corporation.

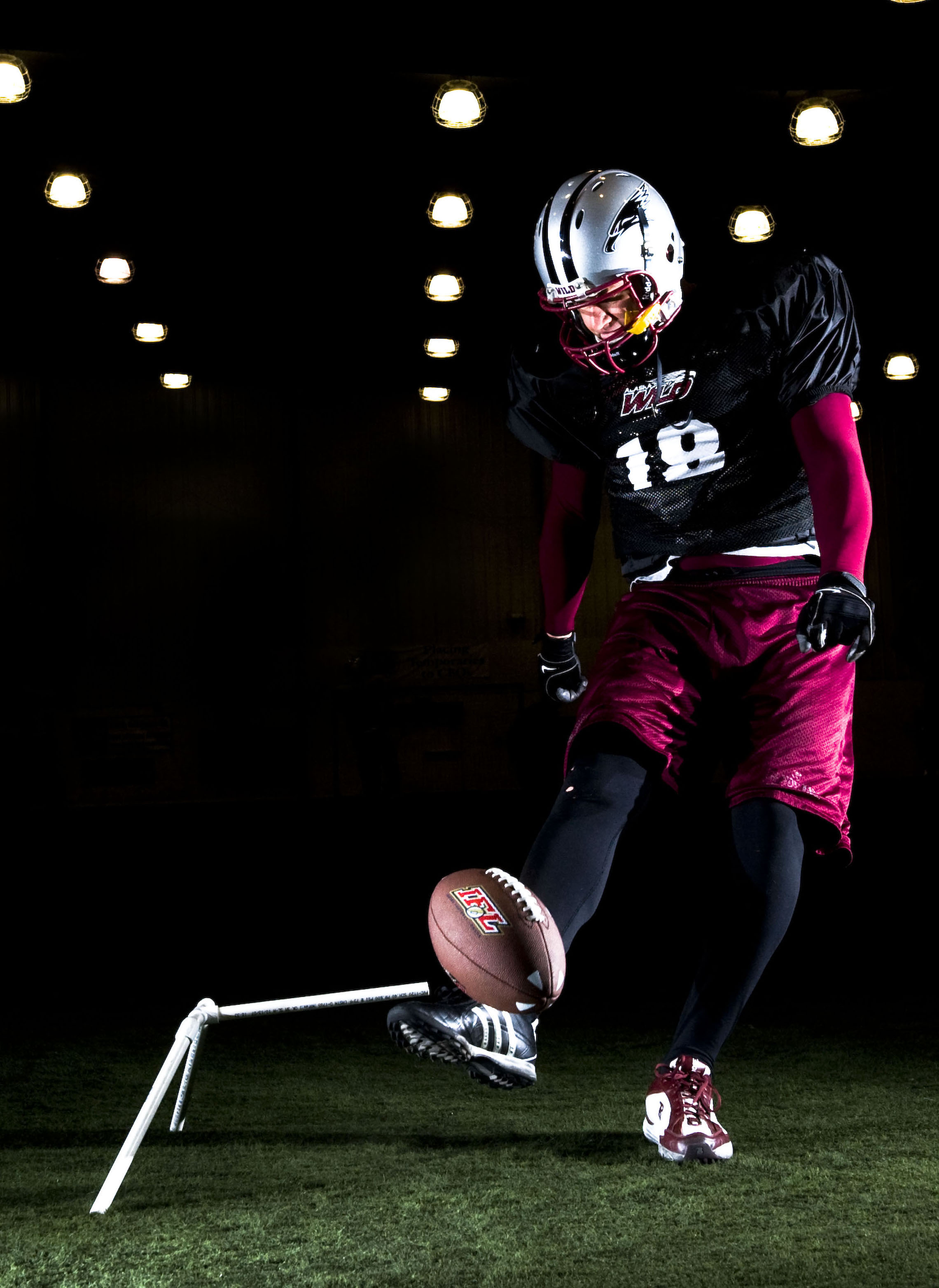
Wild kicker Jeffrey Tongate in 2009

On Friday May 5, 2006, Weatherholt made his plan public when a press release was sent to the Alaska media outlets announcing his plans for bringing a professional indoor football team to Alaska. The Alaska Wild team name was selected as part of a "Name the Team" contest hosted by APS. Over 1,500 names were submitted online by football fans across the United States and Canada. United States Air Force TSgt Deryl Morse submitted the winning team name. Morse was on hand to accept a family four-pack season pass to inaugural season from Anchorage Mayor Mark Begich and Weatherholt.

A public offering for the sale of common stock was approved by the State of Alaska on August 28, 2006. This made Alaska Professional Sports, Inc. one of only three professional sports teams that were publicly owned. (The Boston Celtics in the National Basketball Association and the Green Bay Packers of the National Football League are the other two teams.)

The public offering did not raise enough capital to meet the October 1, 2006 deadline for admission to the af2. On September 29, 2006, Weatherholt made a public announcement that the deadline was missed. Two weeks after Weatherholt announced the delay, Chad Dittman, President of the Intense Football League and the owner of the Corpus Christi Hammerheads, contacted Weatherholt. Weatherholt flew to Dallas, Texas and signed an agreement to join the Intense Football League on October 26, 2006. This meant that in less than 162 days, the Alaska Wild needed to secure a coach, players, equipment, cheerleaders, and mascot, reconfigure the Sullivan Arena for football and all of the thousands of details needed.

Then on January 17, 2007, APS announced that the Alaska Wild had concluded a national search and signed Keith Evans to lead Anchorage's first professional football team. Evans, of Tacoma, Washington, visited team executives in early January for an interview and to familiarize himself with Alaska and the organization. Evans was selected from other applicants because of his west coast background.

On April 12, 2007, at 7:00 pm Alaska sports history was made when the Frisco Thunder, an expansion team, narrowly defeated the Alaska Wild in front of a sellout crowd of over 6,100 excited fans.

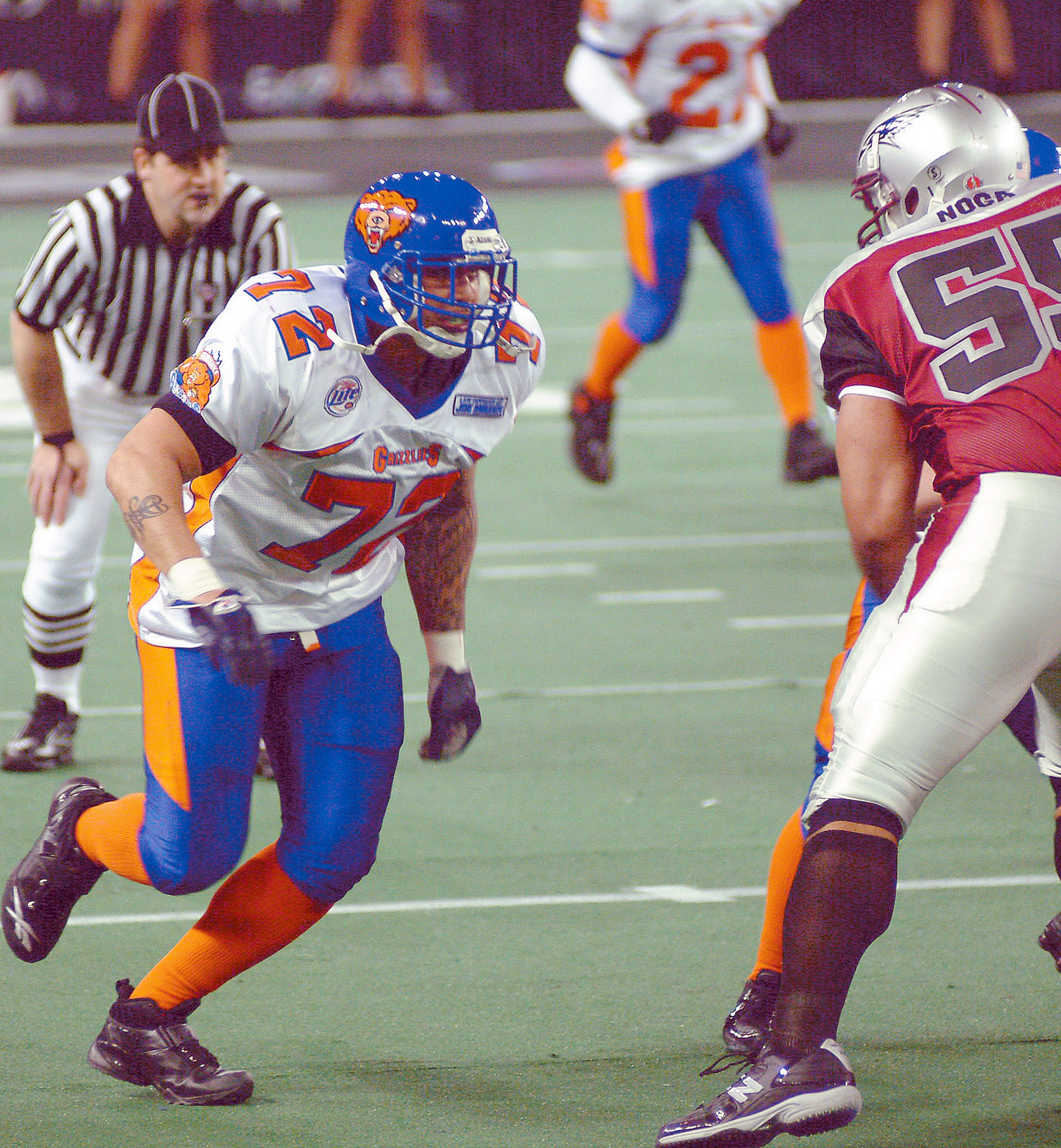
The Fairbanks Grizzlies in a game against Alaska Wild, March 2008

The day after the first game, team management accepted the recommendation of Randy Magner, VP of Operations, the coach's boss, to terminate Keith Evens (0-1) the first coach for the Alaska Wild. Magner was offered the head coach position and refused to take it and ultimately resigned from his position with APS. On April 17, 2006, Hans Deemer (7-21), who had been a volunteer coach, accepted the position of Alaska Wild Head Coach, becoming the second head coach in the team's history.

August 2007 the Alaska Wild Cheerleaders were voted by team owners as the "Best IFL Dance Team".

The 2008 Alaska Wild season opened on March 6, 2008 with an 88-7 victory over the new expansion team from Fairbanks, the Grizzlies. On the field, the Alaska Wild was off to their best start, going into their seventh game with a 4–2 record. On May 8, 2008 David W Weatherholt sold his 90% share of APS to Dr. Randy Deeter. The Team record under Weatherolt's guidance was 6-14 while Deeter had a 1-22 record.

In February 2009, Coach Deemer resigned and was replaced by Floyd Johnson (0–8), the third head coach of the Alaska Wild. New team owner Deeter replaced Johnson after eight games with Sonny Rodriguez (0–6) the fourth head coach. The Alaska Wild finished its third season with a 0–14 record, sagging game attendance and fleeing sponsors. Deeter scrambled to get out from under the staggering debt brought on by the team's on and off the field performances.

In August 2009, Charles Matthews, a Fairbanks pastor, took over the team from Deeter to become the third team owner. On September 27, 2009, Matthews announced that Darnell Lee would take over as the fifth head coach for the Alaska Wild. Mathews did not have the financial resources to support the team, nor was he able to sell enough season tickets and team sponsorships. In March 2010, the Indoor Football League took control of the Alaska Wild team and was to operate the team until a new owner was found or the season ended. In May 2010, after nine games, the team suspended operations. Coach Lee and multiple players left to play elsewhere and the team no longer had money to continue the season.

== All-League selections ==
- KR Demarcus James (1)
- K Larry Stovall-Moody (1)

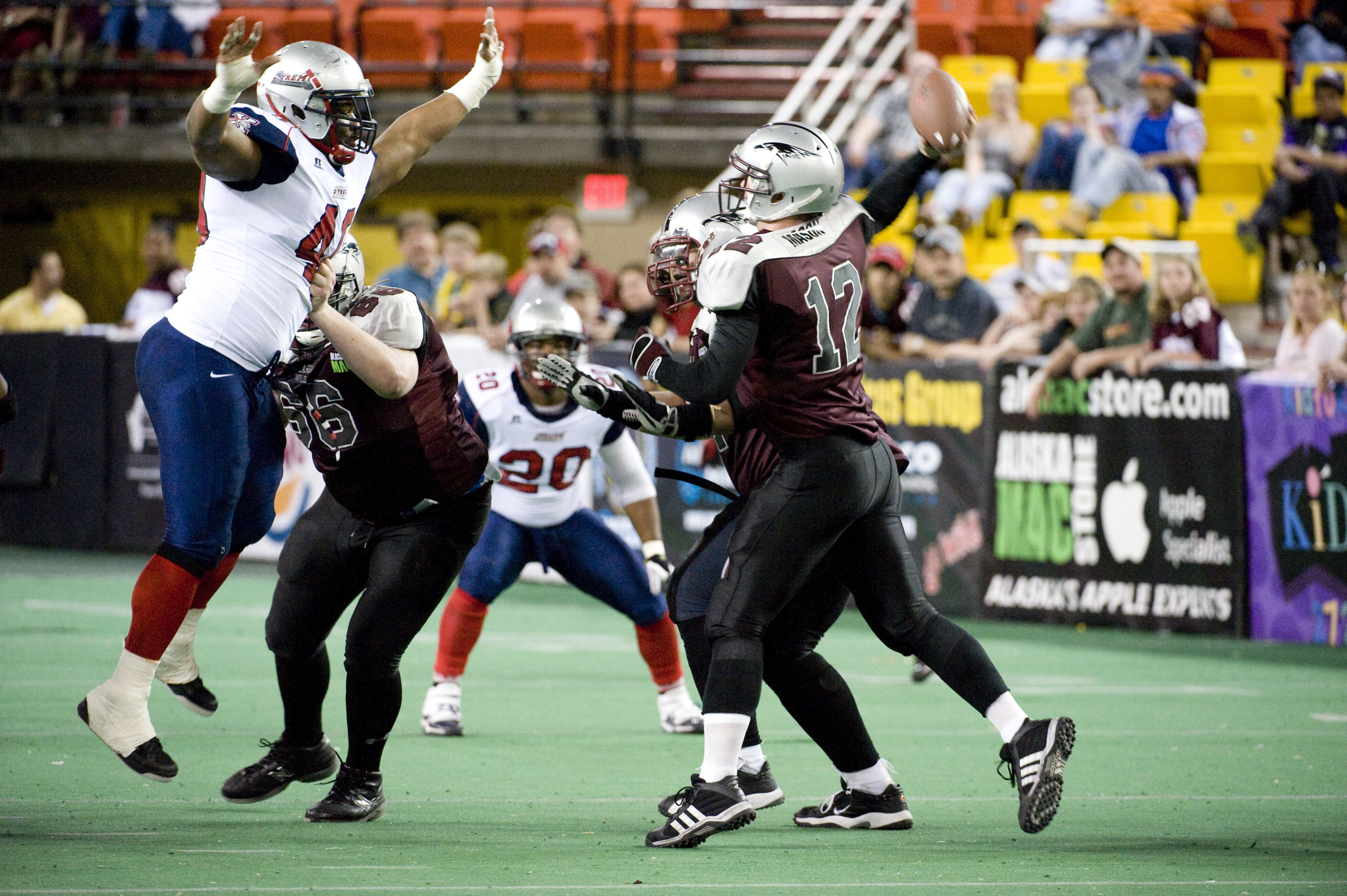
The Wild against the Bloomington Extreme in 2009

== Coaches ==
=== Head coaches ===
Name	Term	Regular season				Playoffs		Awards
Name	Term	W	L	T	Win%	W	L	Awards
Keith Evans	2007	0	1	0	.000	0	0	
Hans Deemer	2007–2008	7	20	0	.259	0	1	
Floyd Johnson	2009	0	8	0	.000	0	0	
Sonny Rodrigeuz	2009	0	4	0	.000	0	0	
Darnell Lee	2010	2	7	0	.222	0	0	
Carl Sundquist	2010	0	1	0	.000	0	0	

=== Coaching changes ===
On April 13, 2007, the Alaska Wild fired coach Keith Evans just hours following the franchise's inaugural game. It marked another turn in the tumultuous path of the Alaska Wild, an expansion team in the Texas-based Intense Football League. The team was unable to agree on contract terms with coach Heywood Hill in January 2007 after prematurely announcing him as head coach the previous month. After Evans termination, Randy Magner was asked to take over head coaching duties, only to resign from the team entirely on April 16. On April 17, Hans Deemer was named head coach; Deemer had been the defensive line coach for the Wild. Deemer resigned in January, 2009. Floyd Johnson was named head coach, but he was fired after starting 0-8. Quarterbacks coach, Sonny Rodriguez was named the Wild interim head coach. In 2010, Darnell Lee was hired to be the Wild's new head coach. Lee quit midway through the 2010 season, the Wild fulfilled their final road game commitment under head coach Carl Sundquist.

== Season-by-season results ==
Note: The finish, wins, losses, and ties columns list regular season results and exclude any postseason play.

League champions	Conference champions	Division champions	Wild card berth	League leader

Season	Team	League	Conference	Division	Regular season				Postseason results
Season	Team	League	Conference	Division	Finish	Wins	Losses	Ties	Postseason results
2007	2007	Intense FL			8th	2	12		
2008	2008	Intense FL			6th	5	9		Lost Wild Card (CenTex)
2009	2009	Indoor FL	Intense	Pacific	4th	0	14		
2010	2010	Indoor FL	Intense	Pacific North	5th	2	12		
Totals						9	47		All-time regular season record (2007-2010)
Totals						0	1	-	All-time postseason record (2007-2010)
Totals						9	48		All-time regular season and postseason record (2007-2010)
