= Abilene Bombers =

- Founded: 2006
- Folded: 2013
- Based in: Abilene, Texas at the Taylor County Expo Center
- Home arenas: Leonard E. Merrell Center (2007–2008); Taylor County Expo Center (2009–2013)
- Mascot: Bee-1
- League: Intense Football League (2007–2008) Indoor Football League (2009–2010): Intense (2009–2010); Lone Star (2009); Lonestar West (2010); Southern Indoor Football League (2011): Western (2011); Southwest (2011); Lone Star Football League (2012–2013)
- Colors: Navy, Action Green, White

Personnel
- Head coach: Joe Brannen
- Owners: BCPSA, LLC.
- Website: www.bombers.biz

The Abilene Bombers were a professional indoor football team. The Bombers played their home games at the Taylor County Expo Center, in Abilene, Texas.

== Team history ==
The Bombers began play as the Katy Ruff Riders, a 2007 expansion team of the Intense Football League. They originally played their home games at the Leonard E. Merrell Center in Katy, Texas. The Bombers relocated to Abilene, Texas at the conclusion of their 2008 Intense Football League season. From then on they were known as the Abilene Ruff Riders. On February 4, 2010, the Ruff Riders were purchased by a local ownership group. After the conclusion of their 2010 season, the team joined the Southern Indoor Football League. After the conclusion of their 2011 season, the team joined the Lone Star Football League. On April 17, 2012, the team changed its name and logo to the Abilene Bombers. They were later owned by BCPSA, LLC. In 2012, they joined the Lone Star Football League. They barely clinched a playoff spot with a 6–7 record, only to fall to the Amarillo Venom in the playoffs 70–40.

== 2008 season schedule ==
Date	Opponent	Location	Result
Sunday, March 9	Frisco Thunder	Frisco, Texas	L 66–63
Saturday, March 15	Fairbanks Grizzlies	Fairbanks, Alaska	W 75–61
Saturday, March 29	Louisiana Swashbucklers	Lake Charles, Louisiana	L 89–26
Saturday, April 12	Louisiana Swashbucklers	Katy, Texas	L 80–45
Saturday, April 26	Louisiana Swashbucklers	Lake Charles, Louisiana	L 70–24
Sunday, May 4	CenTex Barracudas	Katy, Texas	L 79–62
Monday, May 12	San Angelo Stampede Express	Katy, Texas	W 42–20
Saturday, May 17	CenTex Barracudas	Katy, Texas	W 72–63
Saturday, May 24	Frisco Thunder	Katy, Texas	W 57–43
Saturday, May 31	CenTex Barracudas	Belton, Texas	L 63–61
Monday, June 9	Louisiana Swashbucklers	Katy, Texas	L 45–38
Saturday, June 14	Corpus Christi Hammerheads	Katy, Texas	W 48–41
Saturday, June 21	San Angelo Stampede Express	San Angelo, Texas	L 51–48
Saturday, June 28	Odessa Roughnecks	Odessa, Texas	L 74–61

== 2009 season schedule ==
Date	Opponent	Location	Result
Monday, Mar 30	Odessa Roughnecks (exhibition game)	Odessa, Texas	W 36–33
Monday, April 6	Odessa Roughnecks	Abilene, Texas	W 39–24
Saturday, April 11	Omaha Beef	Abilene, Texas	L 52–46
Saturday, April 18	Corpus Christi Hammerheads	Corpus Christi, Texas	W 33–27
Saturday, April 25	San Angelo Stampede Express	Abilene, Texas	W 59–20
Saturday, May 2	Wichita Wild	Park City, Kansas	L 49–33
Saturday, May 9	El Paso Generals	El Paso, Texas	L 58–36
Saturday, May 16	Corpus Christi Hammerheads	Abilene, Texas	W 48–37
Saturday, May 23	El Paso Generals	Abilene, Texas	W 45–35
Saturday, May 30	Corpus Christi Hammerheads	Abilene, Texas	L 27–22
Saturday, June 13	Odessa Roughnecks	Odessa, Texas	W 40–27
Saturday, June 20	Corpus Christi Hammerheads	Corpus Christi, Texas	L 44–35
Saturday, June 27	San Angelo Stampede Express	San Angelo, Texas	L 56–32
Saturday, July 4	Odessa Roughnecks	Abilene, Texas	W 43–27
Saturday, July 11	Odessa Roughnecks	Odessa, Texas	W 40–32
Saturday, July 18 (playoffs)	San Angelo Stampede Express	Abilene, Texas	L 37–34

== Season-by-season ==
Season records
Season	W	L	T	Finish	Playoff results
Katy Ruff Riders (Intense)
2007	7	7	0	5th League	–
2008	5	9	0	7th League	–
Abilene Ruff Riders (IFL)
2009	9	5	0	2nd Intense Lone Star	Lost Round 1 (San Angelo)
2010	2	12	0	3rd Intense Lone Star	–
Abilene Ruff Riders (SIFL)
2011	4	8	0	4th WC Southwest	–
Abilene Ruff Riders (LSFL)
2012	4	8	0	7th LSFL	–
2013	6	6	0	4th LSFL	Lost LSFL Semifinals (Amarillo)
Totals	37	57	0	(including playoffs)	
