= Chris Duliban =

American football player (born 1963)

No. 52
- Position: Linebacker

Personal information
- Born: January 9, 1963 (age 63); Champaign, Illinois, U.S.
- Listed height: 6 ft 2 in (1.88 m)
- Listed weight: 216 lb (98 kg)

Career information
- High school: Spring Woods (TX)
- College: Texas
- NFL draft: 1986: 12th round, 307th overall pick

Career history
- Dallas Cowboys (1986–1987); Buffalo Bills (1988)*
- * Offseason or practice squad member only

Awards and highlights
- Second-team All-SWC (1985)

Career NFL statistics
- Games played: 3
- Stats at Pro Football Reference

Christopher E. Duliban (born January 9, 1963) is an American former professional football player who was a linebacker for the Dallas Cowboys of the National Football League (NFL). He played college football for the Texas Longhorns.

== Early life ==
Duliban attended Spring Woods High School, where he was a two-way player at running back and linebacker. He received All-district honors at linebacker as a junior. He received All-district honors at running back as a senior.

He accepted a football scholarship from the University of Texas at Austin. He began his college career as a backup linebacker, playing mainly on special teams. As a sophomore, he led the team in special teams tackles, including 2 blocked kicks and one punt return for 19 yards, helping them to win the Southwest Conference Championship, reach No. 2 in the rankings and play in the 1984 Cotton Bowl Classic. He had another blocked kick as a junior and helped the team to the 1984 Freedom Bowl.

As a senior, he became a starter at outside linebacker, finishing with 98 tackles (third on the team), 10 sacks (second on the team), 7 passes defensed and one interception and he helped the team get into the 1985 Bluebonnet Bowl.

== Professional career ==
=== Dallas Cowboys ===
Dulliban was selected in the 12th round (307th overall) of the 1986 NFL draft by the Dallas Cowboys. On September 1, he was placed on the injured reserve list with a shoulder injury.

After the NFLPA strike was declared on the third week of the 1987 season, those contests were canceled (reducing the 16-game season to 15) and the NFL decided that the games would be played with replacement players. He crossed the picket line off the injured reserve to be a part of the Dallas replacement team that was given the mock name "Rhinestone Cowboys" by the media. He started 3 games at outside linebacker. He had 2 sacks against the New York Jets earning the defensive player of the week award. On October 27, he was placed on the injured reserve list. He was cut on November 3.

=== Buffalo Bills ===
On March 16, 1988, he was signed as a free agent by the Buffalo Bills. He was released on August 16.

He also spent some time with the St. Louis Cardinals and the Saskatchewan Roughriders.

== Coaching career ==
After some time in business and real estate, he became the head coach for Hyde Park Baptist High School in 1996. Over the next twelve seasons, he reached the playoffs nine times (four semi-finals and nine quarter-finals).

In 1999, he was also the defensive coordinator for the Texas Terminators of the Indoor Professional Football League and took them to the Championship game. In 2001, he was named the head coach of the Austin Rockers in the National Indoor Football League.

In 2007, he became the head coach for the CenTex Barracudas of the Intense Football League where he coached for 2 years, amassing a 10–18 record. In 2008 he led the team to their first and only playoff win before the league went defunct. In 2009, he was named the head coach for the inaugural season of the Austin Turfcats in the Southern Indoor Football League. The team went 10–3 in their first year, finishing in 2nd during the regular season and advancing to the League Championship President's Cup Game, which they lost to Louisiana. In their 2nd season, they went 2–12, failed to make the playoffs and then folded at the end of the season.

He left coaching in 2010 and went into financial management.
