= Cadence Bank Center =

Building in Belton, Texas, United States

Coordinates: 31°1′45″N 97°28′47″W

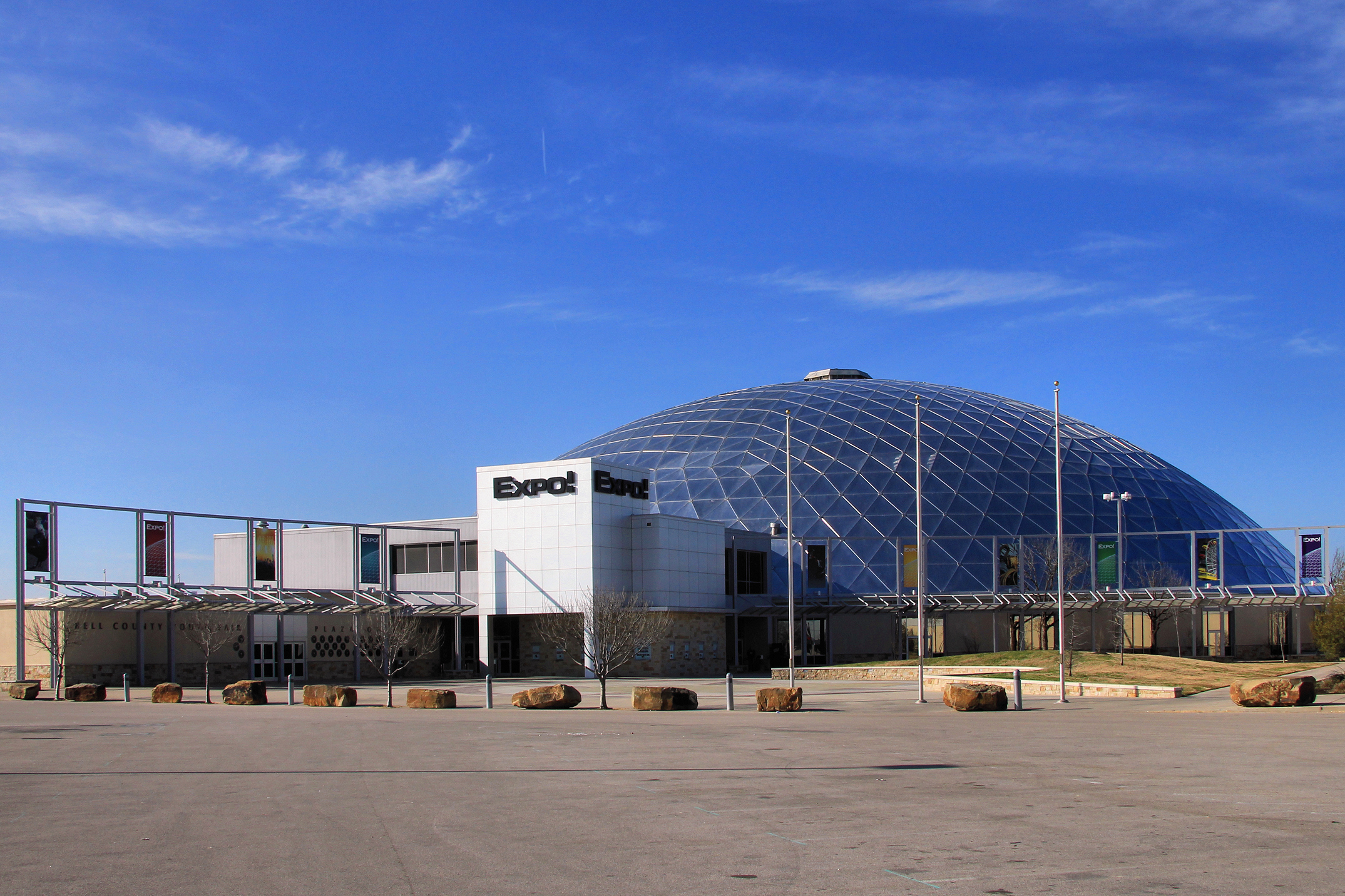
- The Cadence Bank Center, located off Interstate Highway 35 south of Belton in Bell County, Texas
- Interactive map of Cadence Bank Center
- Former names: Bell County Expo Center (1987-2023)
- Location: 301 West Loop 121; Belton, Texas
- Capacity: 6,559

Construction
- Opened: 1987

Tenants
- Central Texas Stampede (WPHL) (1996–2001); Texas Bullets (PIFL) (1998); Central Texas Blackhawks/Marshals (AWHL/NAHL) (2002–2005); CenTex Barracudas (IFL) (2006–2008); CenTex Cavalry (CIF) (2017); ATX Bulls (AF1) (2027–present)

Website
- www.cadencebankcenter.com

The Cadence Bank Center is a 6,559-seat multi-purpose arena, in Belton, Texas. It was formerly the home of the Texas Bullets (PIFL), the CenTex Barracudas (IFL), the Central Texas Stampede (WPHL) and the Central Texas Blackhawks (AWHL). The arena opened in 1987. In 2017, it was home to the CenTex Cavalry of Champions Indoor Football.

The Bank Center also hosts a wide variety of events, including fairs/carnivals, rodeos, concerts, local high school graduations, banquets, Livestock shows, conventions, Booster Clubs and Home and Garden/Craft shows, and was home to the Texas Rodeo Cowboy Hall of Fame.
