= Intense Bowl =

The Intense Bowl was the championship game for the Intense Football League (IFL).

Intense Bowl	Date Played	Winning team	Losing team	Score	Location	City	Att.
1	September 4, 2004	Amarillo Dusters	Lubbock Lone Stars	62-47	Cal Farley Coliseum	Amarillo, TX	4,500
	2005	No game played due to league not being in operation.					
2	August 12, 2006	Odessa Roughnecks	Corpus Christi Hammerheads	97-56	Ector County Coliseum	Odessa, TX	4,442
3	August 11, 2007	Louisiana Swashbucklers	Corpus Christi Hammerheads	46-27	Sudduth Coliseum	Lake Charles, LA	5,772 or 5,040
4	July 28, 2008	Louisiana Swashbucklers	Corpus Christi Hammerheads	66-35	Sudduth Coliseum	Lake Charles, LA	6,120

- Number of appearances:
  - Corpus Christi Hammerheads: 3 (0-3)
  - Louisiana Swashbucklers: 2 (2-0)
  - Amarillo Dusters: 1 (1-0)
  - Odessa Roughnecks: 1 (1-0)
  - Lubbock Renegades: 1 (0-1)

== Box scores ==
=== Scoring Summary ===
Intense Bowl I – Lubbock Lone Stars vs Amarillo Dusters – Game summary

Quarter	1	2	3	4	Total
Lone Stars	6	7	14	20	47
Dusters	14	21	3	24	62

at Cal Farley Coliseum, Amarillo, Texas

- Date: September 4, 2004
- Game time: 7:05 p.m. CST
- Game weather: None (indoor arena)
- Game attendance: 4,500

Game information

Passing

- Lubbock– Aso Pogi: 18/46, 229 yards, 5 TD
- Amarillo – Julian Reese: 10/20, 61 yards, 3 TD

Rushing

- Lubbock – Tone Dancy: 4 att, 11 yards, 1 TD
- Amarillo – Dewayne Miles: 9 att, 41 yards, 3 TD

Receiving

- Lubbock – Carlo Heard: 8 rec, 102 yards, 2 TD
- Amarillo – Anthony Dingle: 4 rec, 22 yards, 1 TD

Total Yards

- Lubbock – 248
- Amarillo – 137

First Downs

- Lubbock – 14
- Amarillo - 11

Fumbles-Lost

- Lubbock - 1–1
- Amarillo - 0–0

Penalties-Yards

- Lubbock - 4–28
- Amarillo - 2–42

=== Scoring Summary ===
Scoring summary

Quarter	Time	Drive			Team	Scoring information	Score	
Quarter	Time	Plays	Yards	TOP	Team	Scoring information	Lubbock Lone Stars	Amarillo Dusters
1	14:24	1	5	0:36	Amarillo Dusters	Julian Reese 5-yard touchdown run, J.W. Boren kick Good	0	7
1	9:45				Amarillo Dusters	Dewayne Miles 13-yard touchdown run, J.W. Boren kick Good	0	14
1					Lubbock Lone Stars	Carlo Heard 9-yard touchdown reception from Aso Pogi, Robert Treece kick Failed	6	14
2					Amarillo Dusters	Dewayne Miles 2-yard touchdown run, J.W. Boren kick Good	6	21
2					Lubbock Lone Stars	T.J. Glover 15-yard touchdown reception from Aso Pogi, Robert Teece kick Good	13	21
2					Amarillo Dusters	Kert Turner 11-yard touchdown reception from Julian Reese, J.W. Boren kick Goof	13	28
2					Amarillo Dusters	Anthony Dingle 1-yard touchdown reception from Julian Reese, J.W. Boren kick Good	13	35
3					Lubbock Lone Stars	Tone Dancy 8-yard touchdown run, Robert Teece kick Good	20	35
3					Lubbock Lone Stars	John Gordon 31-yard touchdown reception from Aso Pogi, Robert Teece kick Good	27	35
3					Amarillo Dusters	34-yard field goal by J.W. Boren	27	38
4					Lubbock Lone Stars	Raymond Hardy 12-yard touchdown reception from Aso Pogi, 2-point pass from Aso Pogi Failed	33	38
4	11:27				Amarillo Dusters	34-yard field goal by J.W. Boren	33	41
4	5:08				Amarillo Dusters	Jimmy Gaston 11-yard touchdown reception from Julian Reese, J.W. Boren kick Good	33	48
4	3:29				Lubbock Lone Stars	Carlo Heard 22-yard touchdown reception from Aso Pogi, Robert Teece kick Failed	39	48
4	3:26	-	-	0:03	Amarillo Dusters	8 yard Kickoff Return Touchdown by Julian Reese, J.W. Boren Kick Good	39	55
4					Lubbock Lone Stars	Louis Fite 1-yard touchdown run, 2-point Heard pass from Aso Pogi Good	47	55
4					Amarillo Dusters	Dewayne Miles 15-yard touchdown run, J.W. Boren kick Good	47	62
"TOP" = time of possession. For other American football terms, see Glossary of American football.							47	62

=== Intense Bowl II: Corpus Christi Hammerheads vs. Odessa Roughnecks ===
Intense Bowl II – Corpus Christi Hammerheads vs Odessa Roughnecks – Game summary

Quarter	1	2	3	4	Total
Hammerheads	7	27	14	8	56
Roughnecks	28	31	14	24	97

at Ector County Coliseum, Odessa, Texas

- Date: August 12, 2006
- Game time: 7:05 p.m. CST
- Game weather: None (indoor arena)
- Game attendance: 4,442

Game information

Passing

- Corpus Christi– Wesley Cooper: 20/33, 192 yards, 5 TD 3 INT
- Odessa – Tommy Jones: 22/37, 245 yards, 9 TD

Rushing

- Corpus Christi – Allan Holland: 2 att, 14 yards, 0 TD
- Odessa – Yvens Louis: 1 att, 7 yards, 1 TD

Receiving

- Corpus Christi – Matthew Barbour: 12 rec, 153 yards, 6 TD
- Odessa – LaVaughn Macon: 10 rec, 118 yards, 6 TD

Total Yards

- Corpus Christi -
- Odessa -

First Downs

- Corpus Christi -

Fumbles-Lost

- Corpus Christi - 3–2
- Odessa - 0–0

Interceptions

- Corpus Christi -
- Odessa -

Penalties-Yards

- Corpus Christi - 8–21
- Odessa - 3–14

=== Scoring Summary ===
Scoring summary

Quarter	Time	Drive			Team	Scoring information	Score	
Quarter	Time	Plays	Yards	TOP	Team	Scoring information	Corpus Christi Hammerheads	Odessa Roughnecks
1	11:50				Corpus Christi Hammerheads	Fred Wallace 8-yard touchdown run, Dustin Bell kick Good	7	0
1	9:18				Odessa Roughnecks	Torrey Day 28-yard touchdown reception from Tommy Jones, Ezequiel Arevalo kick Good	7	7
1	2:38				Odessa Roughnecks	Derin Graham 19-yard touchdown reception from Tommy Jones, Ezequiel Arevalo kick Good	7	14
1	2:31	-	-	-	Odessa Roughnecks	Joel Babb 2 yard fumble recovered for a touchdown, Ezequiel Arevalo Kick Good	7	21
1	2:02				Odessa Roughnecks	Interception returned 22 yards for touchdown by Joey Robinson, Ezequiel Arevalo kick Good	7	28
2	14:23				Corpus Christi Hammerheads	Fred Wallace 3-yard touchdown run, Dustin Bell kick Good	14	28
2	10:55				Odessa Roughnecks	38-yard field goal by Ezequiel Arevalo	14	31
2	9:00				Corpus Christi Hammerheads	Toric Goins 38-yard touchdown reception from Wesley Cooper, Dustin Bell kick Failed	20	31
2	5:45				Odessa Roughnecks	Derin Graham 15-yard touchdown reception from Tommy Jones, Ezequiel Arevalo kick Good	20	38
2	4:51				Corpus Christi Hammerheads	Matt Ross 20-yard touchdown reception from Wesley Cooper, 2-point Fred Wallace Run Good	28	38
2	3:01				Odessa Roughnecks	Torrey Day 5-yard touchdown reception from Tommy Jones, 2-point Jermaine Blakely Pass from Ezequiel Arevalo Good	28	46
2	2:20				Odessa Roughnecks	Derin Graham 24-yard touchdown reception from Tommy Jones, Ezequiel Arevalo kick Good	28	53
2	0:20				Corpus Christi Hammerheads	Toric Goins 8-yard touchdown reception from Wesley Cooper, 2-point Run failed	34	53
2	0:09	1	33	0:11	Odessa Roughnecks	Joel Babb 33-yard touchdown reception from Tommy Jones, Ezequiel Arevalo kick Failed	34	59
3	14:34	1	27	0:26	Corpus Christi Hammerheads	Fred Wallace 27-yard touchdown reception from Wesley Cooper, 2-point Run failed	40	59
3	4:16				Odessa Roughnecks	De'Wayne Hogan 3-yard touchdown reception from Tommy Jones, Ezequiel Arevalo kick Good	40	66
3	2:56	-	-	-	Odessa Roughnecks	Interception returned 18 yards for touchdown by Aaron Dunklin, Ezequiel Arevalo kick Good	40	73
3	0:09				Corpus Christi Hammerheads	Toric Goins 4-yard touchdown run, 2-point Fred Wallace Run Good	48	73
4	12:48				Odessa Roughnecka	34-yard field goal by Ezequiel Arevalo	48	76
4	8:47				Odessa Roughnecks	De'Wayne Hogan 1-yard touchdown run, Ezequiel Arevalo kick Good	48	83
4	9:00				Corpus Christi Hammerheads	Toric Goins 14-yard touchdown reception from Wesley Cooper, 2-point Toric Goins Run Good	56	83
4	2:55				Odessa Roughnecks	Torrey Day 14-yard touchdown reception from Tommy Jones, Ezequiel Arevalo kick Good	56	90
4	0:56				Odessa Roughnecks	Torrey Day 6-yard touchdown reception from Tommy Jones, Ezequiel Arevalo kick Good	56	97
"TOP" = time of possession. For other American football terms, see Glossary of American football.							56	97

=== Intense Bowl III: Corpus Christi Hammerheads vs. Louisiana Swashbucklers ===
Intense Bowl III – Corpus Christi Hammerheads vs Louisiana Swashbucklers – Game summary

Quarter	1	2	3	4	Total
Hammerheads	14	6	0	7	27
Roughnecks	17	10	14	5	46

at Sudduth Coliseum, Lake Charles, Louisiana

- Date: August 11, 2007
- Game time: 7:05 p.m. CST
- Game weather: None (indoor arena)
- Game attendance: 5,040

Game information

Passing

- Corpus Christi–
- Louisiana –

Rushing

- Corpus Christi –
- Louisiana –

Receiving

- Corpus Christi –
- Louisiana –

Total Yards

- Corpus Christi -
- Louisiana -

First Downs

- Corpus Christi -
- Louisiana -

Fumbles-Lost

- Corpus Christi -
- Louisiana -

Interceptions

- Corpus Christi -
- Louisiana -

Penalties-Yards

- Corpus Christi -
- Louisiana -

=== Intense Bowl IV: Corpus Christi Hammerheads vs. Louisiana Swashbucklers ===
Intense Bowl IV – Corpus Christi Hammerheads vs Louisiana Swashbucklers – Game summary

Quarter	1	2	3	4	Total
Hammerheads	20	7	0	8	35
Roughnecks	23	20	14	9	66

at Sudduth Coliseum, Lake Charles, Louisiana

- Date: July 28, 2008
- Game time: 7:05 p.m. CST
- Game weather: None (indoor arena)
- Game attendance: 6,120

Game information

Passing

- Corpus Christi–
- Louisiana – Alvin Bartie: 12/28, 231 yards, 7 TD, 1 INT

Rushing

- Corpus Christi –
- Louisiana –

Receiving

- Corpus Christi –
- Louisiana –

Total Yards

- Corpus Christi -
- Louisiana -

First Downs

- Corpus Christi -
- Louisiana -

Fumbles-Lost

- Corpus Christi -
- Louisiana -

Interceptions

- Corpus Christi -
- Louisiana -

Penalties-Yards

- Corpus Christi -
- Louisiana -
