= Rodney Blackshear =

American football player and coach (born 1969)

No. 3
- Position: Wide receiver / defensive back

Personal information
- Born: July 25, 1969 (age 57); Houston, Texas, U.S.
- Listed height: 6 ft 1 in (1.85 m)
- Listed weight: 190 lb (86 kg)

Career information
- High school: Houston (TX) Reagan
- College: Texas Tech
- NFL draft: 1992: undrafted

Career history

Playing
- Miami Dolphins (1992)*; Dallas Texans (1993); Texas Terror (1996–1997); Houston Thunderbears (1998–1999); Grand Rapids Rampage (2001)
- * Offseason or practice squad member only

Coaching
- Texas Tech (2002) Graduate assistant; Harvest Christian HS (TX) (2003) Offensive coordinator; Rio Grande Valley Dorados (2004) Offensive coordinator; Houston (2005–2006) Wide receivers coach; Lubbock Renegades (2007–2008) Head coach; South Georgia Wildcats (2009) Head coach; Abilene Ruff Riders (2010) Head coach; Amarillo Venom (2011) Head coach; Jersey Village HS (TX) (2012) Defensive backs coach; Texas College (2014) Head coach; Trinity Christian HS (TX) (2015) Head coach; Tall City Black Gold (2026) Head coach

Awards and highlights
- ArenaBowl champion (2001); First-team All-Arena (1998); AFL All-Ironman Team (1998); First-team All-SWC (1991); Second-team All-Southwest Conference (1990)

Career AFL statistics
- Receptions: 228
- Receiving yards: 2,744
- Receiving TDs: 49
- Tackles: 114
- Interceptions: 5
- Stats at ArenaFan.com

Rodney Blackshear (born July 25, 1969) is an American former professional football wide receiver who played in the Arena Football League (AFL). Blackshear played college football at Texas Tech University.

== College career ==
Blackshear was a wide receiver for the Texas Tech Red Raiders from 1987–1991. He led the team in receiving in 1990 and again in 1991. Blackshear holds the Southwest Conference (SWC) and Texas Tech single-game record with 251 on only 5 catches against Houston. He was awarded the "Team MVP" honor in 1990 and "Team Leadership" honor in 1991. Blackshear was honored as a two-time All-SWC member from 90-91 as well as 3rd-Team Pre-Season All American in 91, and received invitations to the Blue–Gray Football Classic and the Japan Bowl in 1991.

Blackshear was the first player to return a kickoff for a touchdown against the 12th Man kickoff unit of Texas A&M. The following season, the Aggies discontinued the longstanding tradition.

Blackshear was inducted into the Texas Tech Sports Hall of Fame in 2013.

== Professional career ==
Blackshear played seven seasons in the AFL where he recorded 204 receptions for 2,482 yards and 45 receiving touchdowns in 52 games for the Houston Thunderbears. He ended his career as the All-Time tackles leader in Houston Thunderbears/Texas Terror team history with 129 total tackles. He also scored a touchdown on an interception as well as a missed field-goal attempt. The 1998 All-Arena First Team (WR/DB) honoree ended his AFL career with the 2001 Arena Bowl Champion Grand Rapids Rampage He was a nominee for the AFL 15 year anniversary team as a WR/DB.].

Blackshear was inducted into the Grand Rapids Sports Hall of Fame as a member of the 2001 AFL Champions Grand Rapids Rampage in 2014

== Coaching career ==
Blackshear began his coaching career as a student asst. coach at Texas Tech in 2002 before being offered the offensive coordinator at Harvest Christian High School in Fort Worth during the 2003 season. He was then the offensive coordinator for the Rio Grande Valley Dorados before spending a season as an WR Coach for the Houston Cougars. He became the head coach of the Centex Barracudas of the Intense Football League in 2006 before leading the Lubbock Renegades in 2007–2008. He coached the South Georgia Wildcats to an 11–5 record in 2009. Blackshear coached the Abilene Ruff Riders in the IFL after head coach Gerald Dockery was dismissed in April 2010 with a team record of 0–5. The team won their first game with Blackshear at the helm. Blackshear was named head coach of the Amarillo Venom of the IFL in November 2010. He was named head coach of the Mesquite Bandits of the Lone Star Football League in January 2012 but the team folded at the end of the month before playing a single game.

== Head coaching record ==
=== College ===
Year	Team	Overall	Conference	Standing	Bowl/playoffs
Texas College Steers (Central States Football League) (2014)
2014	Texas College	1–10	1–4	5th	
Texas College:		1–10	1–4		
Total:		1–10			

=== High school ===
Year	Team	Overall	Conference	Standing	Bowl/playoffs
Trinity Christian Tigers () (2015)
2015	Trinity Christian	10–4	7–0	1st	
Trinity Christian:		10–4	7–0		
Total:		10–4			
National championship Conference title Conference division title or championship game berth
