= Lubbock Municipal Coliseum =

Former arena in Lubbock, Texas, US

Coordinates: 33°35′24″N 101°52′39″W

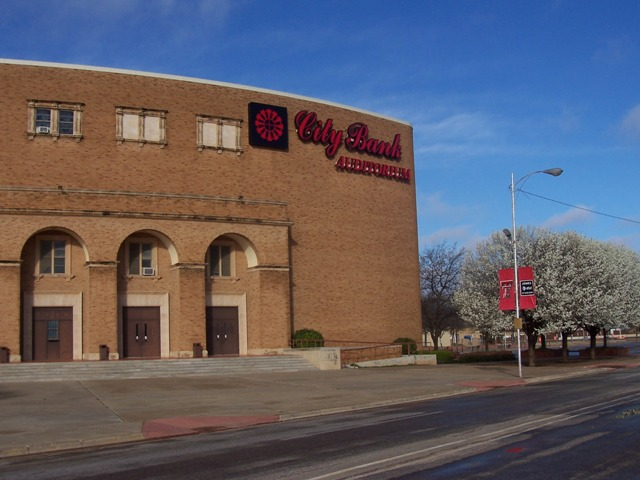
- Lubbock Municipal Coliseum
- Interactive map of Lubbock Municipal Coliseum
- Former names: City Bank Coliseum
- Location: 2720 Drive of Champions; Lubbock, Texas 79409
- Owner: Texas Tech University
- Operator: Texas Tech University
- Capacity: 8,344

Construction
- Groundbreaking: 1954
- Opened: 1956
- Closed: April 6, 2019
- Demolished: April–May 2019

Tenants
- Texas Tech Red Raiders (NCAA) (1956–1999); Texas Chaparrals (ABA) (1970–1971); Texas Tech Lady Raiders (NCAA) (1976–1999); Lubbock Cotton Kings (WPHL/CHL) (1999–2007); Lubbock Lone Stars (IFL) (2004); Lubbock Gunslingers (NIFL) (2005); Lubbock Renegades (AF2) (2007–2008)

Lubbock Municipal Coliseum (formerly City Bank Coliseum) was an 8,344-seat multi-purpose arena in Lubbock, Texas. Although the arena was located on the campus of Texas Tech University, it was owned and operated by the City of Lubbock until 2018. The Coliseum and adjoining Auditorium were demolished in 2019, following the land's transfer of ownership back to the university. The Buddy Holly Hall of Performing Arts and Sciences, located downtown at the intersection of Marsha Sharp Freeway and Ave L, opened in 2020 to replace the Auditorium.

== History ==
On April 27, 1943, the Texas Legislature authorized Texas Tech (then known as Texas Technological College) to give a five-acre tract of land to the City of Lubbock for the purpose of building a municipal auditorium. In 1945, the city approved the issuance of $1.75 million in bonds to construct the Auditorium-Coliseum.

Construction on the complex began in 1954 and the two facilities opened to the public in 1956.

When the United Spirit Arena opened in 1999, the Coliseum had to compete with Texas Tech for events. Following the suspension of the Lubbock Cotton Kings ice hockey team and Lubbock Renegades football team in 2007, the coliseum lacked a permanent tenant.

== Arena usage ==
=== Sports ===
==== Arena football ====
The Coliseum was briefly home to two professional indoor football teams, the Lubbock Gunslingers and Lubbock Renegades.

==== College basketball ====
The Texas Tech Red Raiders basketball team began playing at the Coliseum during the 1956–57 season. The Texas Tech Lady Raiders team began playing select games during the 1976–77 and 1977–78 seasons. The Lady Raiders began playing only at Lubbock Municipal Coliseum beginning with the 1978–79 season. After the venue now known as the United Supermarkets Arena opened in 1999, both teams relocated to the university-owned and operated arena. The Coliseum also hosted the Midwest Regional semi-final and final games of the 1966 NCAA Men's Division I basketball tournament won by the Texas Western Miners (now UTEP), who went on to upset the Kentucky Wildcats in the national championship game in College Park, Maryland.

==== Ice hockey ====
The arena was the home to the Lubbock Cotton Kings of the Central Hockey League from 1999 to 2007. However, after being unable to come to an agreement with the city of Lubbock for the use of the arena, the team suspended operations prior to the 2007–08 season. The building was also briefly home to the Texas Tech club hockey team from the start of their 2007 season until their eviction in 2008.

==== Professional basketball ====
During the 1971–72 American Basketball Association season, the Lubbock Municipal Coliseum served as a sometimes home court for the then-named Texas Chaparrals, a one-year experiment by the Dallas Chaparrals to expand their appeal to a statewide audience. The Chaparrals eventually became the San Antonio Spurs of the American Basketball Association and later of the NBA.

==== Wrestling ====
Lubbock Municipal Coliseum was the Lubbock home of WWE since the 1980s. WCW also visited the Coliseum for most of the 1990s until United Supermarkets Arena (originally United Spirit Arena) opened.

=== Concerts ===
The Lubbock Municipal Coliseum was a popular stop for touring artists. In the 1980s, artists such as Van Halen, Bon Jovi, Def Leppard, Ozzy Osborne, Billy Idol and more played the Coliseum. Major concert tours have since moved to United Supermarkets Arena.

=== Other ===
The Coliseum was used for the Ringling Brothers and Barnum and Bailey Circus, Disney on Ice and Stars on Ice.

== Final event ==
The final event to take place at the Coliseum was the 77th annual ABC Pro Rodeo April 4–6, 2019. The 2019 rodeo was the 63rd year which it was held at the Coliseum. Fittingly, the first event held at the Coliseum in 1956 was the 14th ABC Pro Rodeo.

== Lubbock Municipal Auditorium ==
Lubbock Municipal Auditorium
- Interactive map of Lubbock Municipal Auditorium
- Address: 2720 Drive of Champions; Lubbock, Texas 79409
- Capacity: 2,803
- Type: Auditorium
- Current use: Demolished

Construction
- Opened: 1956
- Closed: 2018
- Demolished: April–May 2019
- Years active: 1956–2018

Adjacent to the coliseum was the 2,803-seat Lubbock Municipal Auditorium. The auditorium hosted its final event on September 27, 2018, when Robert Plant performed with his band, The Sensational Space Shifters.

The auditorium was demolished in April and May 2019 along with the attached Lubbock Municipal Coliseum following the land's transfer of ownership back to Texas Tech University.
