= Central Pavilion Arena =

Multi-purpose arena in Robstown, Texas

Coordinates: 27.792213°N 97.645756°W

The Central Pavilion Arena is a multi-purpose arena in Robstown, Texas with a capacity of just under 3,000. Completed in December 2006, it was the home of the Corpus Christi Hammerheads of the Indoor Football League from 2007 to 2009.
