= Mike Arthur =

American football player (born 1968)

No. 65, 50
- Position: Center

Personal information
- Born: May 7, 1968 (age 58); Minneapolis, Minnesota, U.S.
- Listed height: 6 ft 3 in (1.91 m)
- Listed weight: 280 lb (127 kg)

Career information
- High school: Spring Woods (Houston, Texas)
- College: Texas A&M
- NFL draft: 1991: 5th round, 130th overall pick

Career history
- Cincinnati Bengals (1991–1992); New England Patriots (1993–1994); Green Bay Packers (1995–1996)

Awards and highlights
- Super Bowl champion (XXXI); First-team All-American (1990); First-team All-SWC (1990)

Career NFL statistics
- Games played: 64
- Games started: 38
- Fumble recoveries: 3
- Stats at Pro Football Reference

Mike Arthur (born May 7, 1968) is an American former professional football player who was a center in the National Football League (NFL).

== Biography ==
Arthur was born Michael Scott Arthur on May 7, 1968, in Minneapolis, Minnesota. Arthur grew up in Houston, Texas, and played football at Spring Woods High School.

== Career ==
Arthur was drafted in the fifth round of the 1991 NFL draft by the Cincinnati Bengals and spent his first two seasons with the team. The next two seasons he spent with the New England Patriots. His final two seasons were played with the Green Bay Packers, including a victory in Super Bowl XXXI.

He played at the collegiate level at Texas A&M University.
