= South Texas Oilfield Expo =

The South Texas Oilfield Expo is an oil and gas industry trade show held annually at the Henry B. Gonzalez Convention Center in San Antonio. Produced by trade show production company Event Equity Partners LLC, the expo was previously held at the American Bank Center in Corpus Christi. The 2012 event featured 2000 exhibitors in over 600 booths, and was the largest event held at the American Bank Center since SMG took over the venue in 2004, according to facility administrators.

The 2014 event, which took place July 9–10, 2014, was recognized by Trade Show Executive's annual "Fastest 50 Awards & Summit" as the fifth fastest-growing trade show in North America when measured by net square footage. The 2016 event was held on July 27 and 28, 2016.
