= Spring Woods High School =

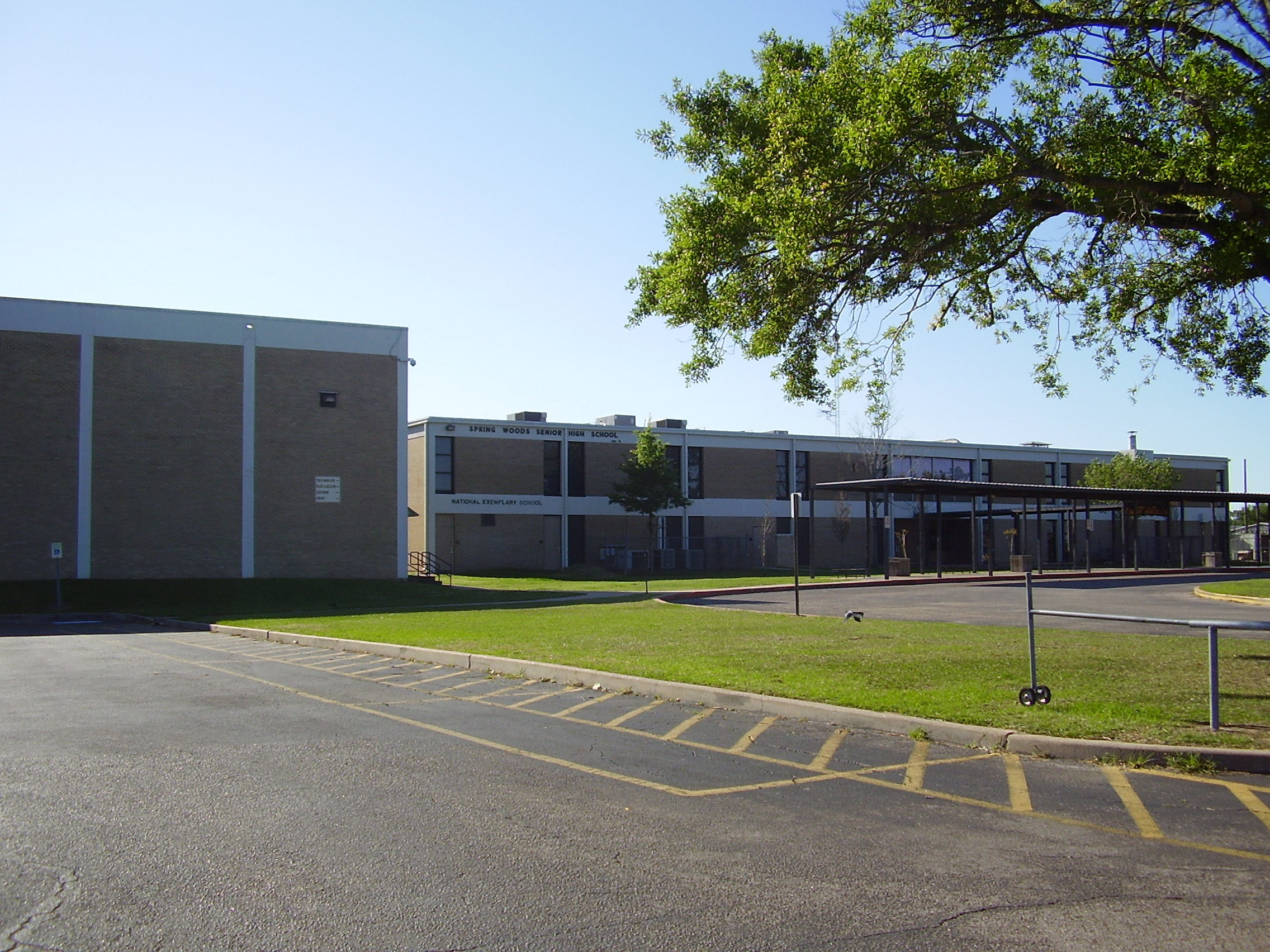

Location
- 2045 Gessner Rd. Houston, Texas 77080; United States; 29.81086°N 95.54764°W

Information
- School type: Public school (U.S.)
- Motto: Success With Honor and Spirit
- Established: 1964
- School district: Spring Branch Independent School District
- Principal: Stephanie Meshell
- Staff: 140.31 (FTE)
- Grades: 9–12
- Enrollment: 2,068 (2023–2024)
- Student to teacher ratio: 14.74
- Colors: Black and gold
- Mascot: Tuffy the Tiger
- Nickname: Tigers
- Rival: Northbrook Senior High School
- Newspaper: The Regit
- Yearbook: Safari
- Website: https://swh.springbranchisd.com/

Spring Woods High School is a public secondary school in Spring Branch, Houston, Texas, United States. The school, serving grades 9 through 12, is operated by Spring Branch Independent School District (SBISD).

Spring Woods serves several neighborhoods, including Campbell Woods, Royal Oaks, Spring Meadows, Shadow Oaks, and a portion of Spring Shadows. A section of the Memorial City district is within the school's attendance zone.

Founded in 1964, Spring Woods was built to accommodate the rapid population growth in Houston’s western suburbs and has grown into one of the oldest high schools in the district with their football team having 27 state titles. The campus occupies the former grounds of the Spring Branch Country Club.

== History ==
Spring Woods High School opened in 1964 during the population boom in the western suburbs of Houston on the former grounds of the Spring Branch Country Club. It opened within a year of the openings of Spring Oaks Junior High (now Spring Oaks Middle School) and Westwood Elementary School, all immediately adjacent on the same former golf course. Currently the second-oldest functioning high school in the Spring Branch ISD, Spring Woods serves the northwest part of the district, roughly an area north of Interstate 10 and west of Gessner Road. Expanded and renovated several times, the Spring Woods campus has wide courtyards in which classrooms face inwards, yet with passages that are open to the outside air, a different approach than Northbrook High School and Stratford High School, the two newer schools in the district, which are mostly enclosed but are still kept dry and warm when weather becomes an issue. Spring Woods opened about the same time and with a similar design as Westchester High School, which closed in the 1980s and is currently home to a district-run charter school called Westchester Academy for International Studies.

In 1992 the school's student body was 25% Hispanic, 13% Black, and 13% Asian. In May 1992, 25 12th grade students vandalized the school by spray painting racial slurs, placing the Confederate flag on the flagpole, placing a dead raccoon and a dead opossum in two empty lockers, and drew an image of a black person being impaled on a cross. The principal of Spring Woods, Perry Pope, said that the students took their prank "too far."

Spring Woods was named a 1997–98 National Blue Ribbon School.

Spring Woods has been represented by a costumed tiger mascot since the 1960s. The first female to wear the costume was in the early '80s. The tiger goes by the name of Tuffy and has a sister (if there are 2 people costumed) named Tilly the Tiger. Sometimes Tuffy and Tilly have been accompanied by a third mascot Baby Tiger.

Student Mason Kalkofen felt compelled to wear a hazmat suit in December 2020 after he was obliged to take his final exams in person, because his mother had a high risk of contagion with COVID-19. The school, which has had 17 student and eight employee infections, said it was taking an abundance of caution.

In 2003, two students were awarded the prestigious Gates Millennium Scholarship, which is awarded each year to only 1,000 graduating seniors across the United States. In 2007, Spring Woods had two students qualify for National Leadership Conference at New York City. Students advanced through Area and State competitions to earn a spot at the National Leadership Conference.

== Feeder patterns ==
Elementary schools that feed into Spring Woods include:

- Shadow Oaks
- Spring Branch
- Westwood
- Woodview
- Pine Shadows (partial)
- Sherwood (partial)
- Terrace (partial)

Middle schools that feed into Spring Woods include:

- Spring Branch Middle School (partial)
- Spring Oaks Middle School (partial)
- Spring Woods Middle School (partial)

== Notable alumni ==
- Tate (Michel Taylor) Armstrong - basketball player, Olympic gold medalist 1976, NBA's Chicago Bulls 1977–1979; played college basketball for Duke Blue Devils
- Mike Arthur - former NFL player
- Kurt Brecht - musician, songwriter, vocalist for D.R.I. (Dirty Rotten Imbeciles)
- Roger Clemens - Major League Baseball pitcher, Boston Red Sox, Toronto Blue Jays, New York Yankees, Houston Astros; 11 x All Star, 2 x World Series, 7 x Cy Young winner, active 1984–2007
- Chris Duliban - former NFL player
- Mica Endsley - Chief Scientist of the United States Air Force
- Robert Ferguson - former NFL and UFL wide receiver (Green Bay Packers, Minnesota Vikings, Omaha Nighthawks)
- John Goodson - former NFL player
- Frank G. Helmick - Army lieutenant general
- Greg Koch - former NFL tackle and guard (Green Bay Packers, Miami Dolphins, Minnesota Vikings)
- Beth Moore - author, teacher of bestselling Bible studies and books for women, founder of Living Proof Ministries, popular speaker
- Ted Poe U.S. Representative - served as Harris County Chief Prosecutor and Judge before becoming Congressman representing Texas' 2nd Congressional District in 2005
- Chris Snyder - MLB catcher, Arizona Diamondbacks, Pittsburgh Pirates, Houston Astros, Baltimore Orioles; active from 2004-2013
- R. C. Thielemann - former NFL guard (Washington Redskins, Atlanta Falcons)
- Kimberly Tomes - Miss USA 1977
