= Hilliard Center =

Arena in Texas, United States

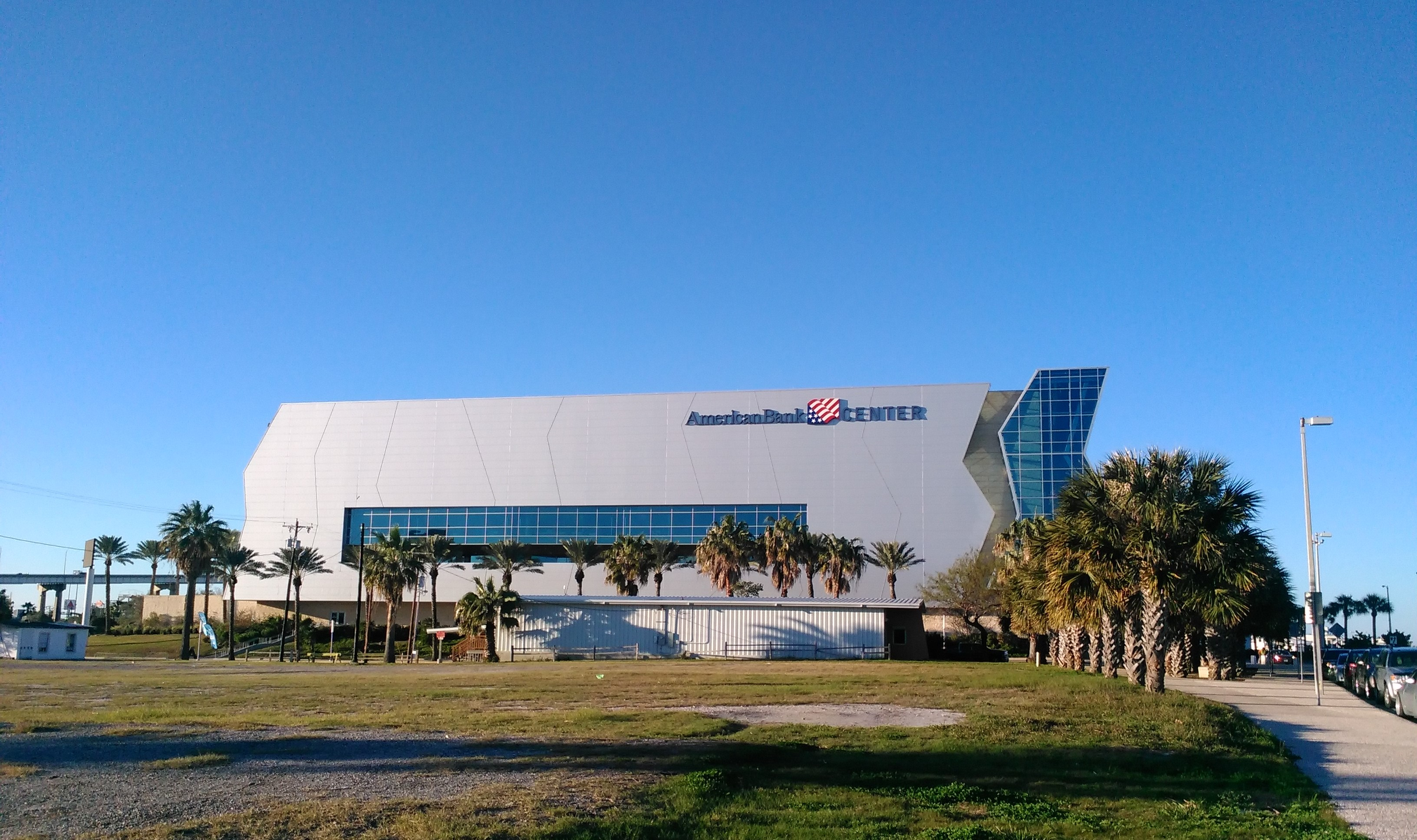
- Interactive map of Hilliard Center
- Former names: Bayfront Plaza (1978–2004); American Bank Center (2004–2025)
- Address: 1901 North Shoreline Boulevard
- Location: Corpus Christi, Texas, U.S.
- Coordinates: 27°48′26.42″N 97°23′36.82″W
- Owner: City of Corpus Christi (operated by Oak View Group)
- Capacity: 10,000 (arena); 2,500 (Selena Auditorium)
- Type: Entertainment complex

Construction
- Opened: 1978
- Renovated: 2002–2004

Website
- hilliardcenter.com

The Hilliard Center is an entertainment complex located in Corpus Christi, Texas. The complex consists of an auditorium, convention center and arena. The facility hosts numerous conventions, trade shows, exhibitions, live performances and sporting events. It is home to the Corpus Christi IceRays Tier II Jr. A ice hockey team and the Texas A&M–Corpus Christi Islanders men's and women's NCAA basketball teams. It is owned by the city of Corpus Christi and now managed by Oak View Group after replacing ASM Global due to performance concerns.

== Facilities ==
=== Hilliard Center ===
The Hilliard Center Arena is an indoor arena located adjacent to the American Bank Center Convention Center. The construction of the arena was a joint effort by Thompson Ventulett Stainback & Associates, Arquitectonica and Gignac & Associates. The venue broke ground on November 3, 2002, and was completed in October 2004. Unique to the area is its split-tiered seating system design. This allows the large venue to have the illusion of a theatre setting. The maximum capacity of the arena is 10,000 for sporting events and concerts. The cost of the project was over $49 million.

The Hilliard Center was previously named The American Bank Center. After a controversial bidding war between Thomas J. Henry and law firm "Hilliard Law", the buildings management team "Oak View Group", passed on Thomas J. Henry's higher bid of $2 million dollars per year for Hilliard Law's $1.3 million dollars per year for a 10 year contract after sponsors threatened to walk away if he was chosen. The building was officially renamed on September 1, 2025, after Hilliard Law acquired sponsorship and naming rights for $1.3 million dollars a year.

=== Selena Auditorium ===
The Selena Auditorium opened in 1979, then known as the Bayfront Plaza Auditorium. The venue was the filming location of the Johnny Canales Show. In 1996, the venue was renamed in commemoration of notable resident, Tejano musician Selena Quintanilla-Pérez, whose memorial and public viewing were held at the venue the previous year. It was renovated in 2004 to connect the property to the other buildings in the complex. The maximum capacity is 2,500. The venue is noted for its acoustics and for being "one of the most attended venues for entertainment in the Texas Coastal Bend area".

=== Bayfront Plaza ===
First opened in 1980 as the Bayfront Plaza Convention Center, it underwent renovation and was renamed American Bank Center Convention Center in November 2004. The convention center consists of five exhibits halls, two ballrooms and 21 meeting rooms. The main ballroom is called the Henry Garrett Ballroom. The South Texas Oilfield Expo was one of the largest patrons of the convention center in 2012.

== Events ==
=== Rodeo ===
Rodeo Corpus Christi has been held annually every May at the venue for several years. It was sanctioned by the Professional Rodeo Cowboys Association (PRCA) before becoming sanctioned by the World Champions Rodeo Alliance (WCRA) from 2022 to 2025. The WCRA went out of business and Rodeo Corpus Christi returned to being sanctioned by the PRCA in 2026.

The Professional Bull Riders (PBR) have had an event held in conjunction with Rodeo Corpus Christi since 2021. That year, it was a regular-season stop on the PBR's Velocity Tour. Since 2022, the venue has been the site of the PBR Velocity Tour Finals.

=== Professional wrestling ===
On May 31, 2015, WWE hosted that year's edition of their Elimination Chamber pay-per-view event. In 2019, the arena hosted the December 18 episode of AEW Dynamite.

EliteXC: Renegade was held at the arena in 2007 and WEC 39 in 2009.

==== Chris Benoit double-murder and suicide ====
In 2007, the arena was the site for a controversial event in the WWE. The same day as the scheduled Monday Night Raw taping, professional wrestler Chris Benoit along with his wife and son were found dead, with the promotion running a tribute show while being unaware of the horrific circumstances surrounding the deaths until the show almost ended.

=== Arena Football ===
The arena has played host to arena football games in the past including such teams as the Corpus Christi Hammerheads/Fury (various leagues), Corpus Christi Sharks (af2), Corpus Christi Rage (National Arena League) and Corpus Christi Tritons (AIF and AF1).

=== Events ===
- Record Breaking Concert

On August 14th of 2026 the Hilliard Center held a historic milestone for the Corpus Christi entertainment scene. Singer-songwriter Elizabeth Camille Langley, largely known as "Ella Langley" visited the Hilliard Center as it hosted her concert for "The Dandelion Tour". According to local news the sold-out concert packed over 9,000 fans into the event center leading to the concert setting a new record of highest attended event at the center since Global Venue Giant oak view group took over management in June of 2022.

== See also ==
- List of NCAA Division I basketball arenas
