= Lubbock Renegades =

Arena football team

Logo

General information
- Founded: 2006
- Folded: 2008
- Headquartered: City Bank Coliseum in Lubbock, Texas
- Colors: Black, blue, tan, white

Personnel
- Owners: Doug McGregor; Rick Dykes; Bart Reagor
- Head coach: Rodney Blackshear

Team history
- Lubbock Renegades (2007–2008)

Home fields
- City Bank Coliseum (2007–2008)

League / conference affiliations
- AF2 (2007–2008): National Conference (2007–2008); Central Division (2007–2008)

Playoff appearances (1)
- 2008

The Lubbock Renegades were an expansion member of the AF2. The team played its home games at the City Bank Coliseum, which was the former home of the IFL/NIFL team, the Lubbock Lone Stars/Gunslingers. The team was owned by Doug McGregor, Rick Dykes, and Bart Reagor. It was coached by former Texas Tech wide receiver Rodney Blackshear. On September 9, 2008, it was announced that the Renegades were ceasing operations. The team was locally owned by Bart Reagor and Rick Dykes.

== Results by season ==
Season records
Season	W	L	T	Finish	Playoff results
2007	7	9	0	4th NC Central	--
2008	9	7	0	3rd NC Central	Lost NC Round 1 (Bossier-Shreveport)
Totals	16	17	0	(including playoffs)	

== 2008 schedule ==
Week	Date	Opponent	Venue	Result	Record
1	April 5	at Austin Wranglers	Frank Erwin Center	**W 75–41**	1–0
2	April 12	**Oklahoma City Yard Dawgz**	City Bank Coliseum	**W 63–43**	2–0
3	April 19	Texas Copperheads	City Bank Coliseum	**W 48–46**	3–0
4	April 26	**Tulsa Talons**	City Bank Coliseum	**L 53–69**	3–1
5	May 3	Spokane Shock	City Bank Coliseum	**L 41–43**	3–2
6	May 10	at **Amarillo Dusters**	Amarillo Civic Center	**W 69–35**	4–2
7	May 17	**Arkansas Twisters**	City Bank Coliseum	**W 64–57**	5–2
8	May 24	at Texas Copperheads	Berry Center	**W 75–42**	6–2
9	May 31	Rio Grande Valley Dorados	City Bank Coliseum	**W 48–20**	7–2
10	June 7	at **Tulsa Talons**	Tulsa Convention Center	**L 40–70**	7–3
11	June 14	at **Arkansas Twisters**	Verizon Arena	**L 25–61**	7–4
12	June 21	**Amarillo Dusters**	City Bank Coliseum	**W 60–49**	8–4
13	June 28	at **Oklahoma City Yard Dawgz**	Cox Convention Center	**L 62–74**	8–5
14	July 11	Austin Wranglers	City Bank Coliseum	**L 54–60**^{OT}	8–6
15	**BYE**				
16	July 21	**Amarillo Dusters**	City Bank Coliseum	**L 35–42**	8–7
17	July 26	at **Rio Grande Valley Dorados**	Dodge Arena	**W 72–53**	9–7

Note: Intra-division opponents are in bold text.

=== Postseason ===
Week	Date	Opponent	Venue	Result	Record
Round 1	August 2	at Bossier–Shreveport Battle Wings	CenturyTel Center	**L 61–71**	0–1
