= Bayou Bucks =

American indoor football team

Logo

General information
- Founded: 2003
- Headquartered: Louisiana at TBD
- Colors: Forest green, moss green, orange, white

Personnel
- Owners: Jacob Hector & Justin Swearingen
- Head coach: James Shiver
- President: Jacob Hector

Team history
- Amarillo Dusters (2004–2009, 2025); Amarillo Venom (2010–2021, 2024); Bayou Bucks (2026–present)

Home fields
- Amarillo Civic Center (2004–2021, 2024); TBD (2027-future)

League / conference affiliations
- Intense Football League (2004); AF2 (2005–2009); National Conference (2005–2009); Midwest Division (2005–2006); Central Division (2007–2009); Indoor Football League (2010–2011); Intense Conference (2010–2011); Lonestar West Division (2010); Lonestar Division (2011); Lone Star Football League (2012–2014); Champions Indoor Football (2015–2020); Southern Division (2016); South Conference (2017–2019); Lone Star Series (2021); American Indoor Football (2024)

Championships
- League championships: 3: IFL: 2004; LSFL: 2012, 2013
- Division championships: 2: IFL: 2010; CIF: 2016

Playoff appearances (12)
- IFL: 2004; AF2: 2005, 2008; IFL: 2010; LSFL: 2012, 2013; CIF: 2015, 2016, 2017, 2018, 2019; LSS: 2021

The Bayou Bucks are a professional indoor football team based in Louisiana. The Bucks began play as the Amarillo Dusters in 2004 as a charter member of the Intense Football League, a small indoor football league based in Amarillo, Texas, and previously played their home games at the Amarillo Civic Center during that time. They won the championship in their first and only season with the Intense Football League.

In 2005, the Dusters became the first team to leave the Intense Football League and join the AF2, the minor league of the Arena Football League, where they played for four seasons until the AF2's folding in 2009. At that point, the team held a fan vote as to whether to join some of their AF2 brethren in the new Arena Football 1 (later gaining rights to the name as Arena Football League) or enjoy numerous Texas rivalries in the Indoor Football League. In 2009, it was announced that the Dusters would be moving to the Indoor Football League for the 2010 season. It was then announced that the Dusters would have to be renamed because the Arena Football League owned the rights to the Dusters name and logo and the team became the Amarillo Venom.

The Venom then joined the Lone Star Football League for the 2012 season, which eventually merged into Champions Indoor Football (CIF) prior to the 2015 season. Prior to the 2021 season, the Venom withdrew from the CIF and later formed the Arena Football Association for the 2022 season. However, the team suspended operations in February 2022.

The team was featured on an episode of Only in America, a show that aired on the Discovery Times channel.

The Venom were relaunched for the 2024 season as members of the revived American Indoor Football league, but did not complete the season and went silent on May 30, 2024.

On July 26, 2024, it was announced that the team will be rebranded back to the Dusters for the 2025 season. On August 20, 2024, it was announced that the Dusters had joined the National Arena League for that season. However, their membership was terminated on February 2, 2025. The team eventually folded for good in 2025 following the announcement of the return of and relocation of the West Texas Warbirds to Amarillo.

On January 23, 2026, the team announced their intention to move to somewhere in Louisiana and have rebranded as the Bayou Bucks starting in 2027.

== History ==
=== Amarillo Dusters (2004–2009) ===
==== Expansion championship (2004) ====
The Amarillo Dusters were led by head coach Don Carthel and finished their only season in the Intense Football League with a 13–3 record en route to a league championship over the Lubbock Lone Stars. The Dusters left the league to play in the AF2 the following season.

==== Move to AF2 (2005–2009) ====
In their first year in the AF2, the Amarillo Dusters reached the playoffs with an 8–8 record, which was good enough for a wildcard. The Dusters, quarterbacked by Julian Reese, came from 21 points down at the start of the fourth quarter to win Round 1 over the Oklahoma City Yard Dawgz. The Dusters fell in Round 2 to the eventual champion Memphis Xplorers.

The Dusters tried to build on the moderate success they had in 2005. However, in 2006, the team suffered many injuries and failed to make it to the AF2 playoffs. Quarterback Steve Panella was injured early in the season, forcing numerous backups to take the job. They ended the season with a 4–12 record. Carthel left to take the head coaching job at West Texas A&M two games into the Dusters first AF2 season.

For 2005, Steve Perdue took over the head coaching job and lead the team playoffs and a first round victory over the Oklahoma City Yard Dawgs. Looking to rebound after the previous losing season, injuries plagued the Dusters' offense. After a win against the Lubbock Renegades the Dusters struggled for the remainder of the year but were still able end the Quincy Carter-led Bossier-Shreveport Battle Wings' perfect season with a 51–49 upset.

On July 5, 2008, Dusters running back Donte Newsome was shot to death outside of a nightclub in Huntington, West Virginia, home of his alma mater Marshall University.

In 2008, under the leadership of head coach Chris MacKeown and quarterback Julian Reese, the Amarillo Dusters went 10–9 and played for the AF2 National Conference ArenaCup Finals. Following the Dusters most successful season in their AF2 history, MacKeown moved up to the Arena Football League as the offensive coordinator for John Elway's Colorado Crush.

On December 21, 2008, the Dusters introduced a new color scheme for the team with crimson, grey, and black.

=== Amarillo Venom (2010–2021, 2024) ===
Amarillo Venom logo (2010–2021, 2024)

==== Moving to the IFL (2010–2011) ====
With the AF2 breaking up and its larger market teams moving to the newly reformed Arena Football League, the Dusters were forced to find a new league. On October 9, 2009, it was announced that, because of a 65–35 percent margin in the fan vote, the Dusters would be moving to the Indoor Football League for the 2010 season. Owner Randy Sanders applied for his team's spot in the Indoor Football League (IFL) and they were accepted as an expansion franchise. It was announced on January 28, 2010, that the Dusters would have to be renamed, because the Arena Football League owned the rights to the Dusters' name and logo. On February 8, the new Amarillo Venom name and logo was unveiled.

==== Move to the LSFL (2012–2014) ====
In August 2011, the Venom were sold to local couple Stephanie and Toby Tucker, with Stephanie taking on the role of general manager. For the 2012 season, the Venom joined the Lone Star Football League (LSFL). In their inaugural season in the LSFL they won the 2012 championship. Under the leadership of quarterback Nate Davis and coach Julian Reese, the Venom finished the 2013 season with a 9–3 record. In the playoffs, the finished off the Abilene Bombers, 70–40.

On July 13, 2013, they faced the Laredo Rattlesnakes, where they won 70–69, winning back-to-back championships in the LSFL. Davis won the MVP of the Game.

==== Champions Indoor Football (2015–2020) ====
In 2014, after the completion of their third season in the LSFL, the league merged with Champions Professional Indoor Football League to become Champions Indoor Football. The Venom qualified for the playoffs in each of the next five seasons, including making it to the 2016 championship game where they lost to the Wichita Force 48–45. Prior to the start of the 2020 season, the onset of the COVID-19 pandemic caused the season to be cancelled.

==== Lone Star Series and Arena Football Association (2021–2022) ====
The 2021 season was then delayed, but the local capacity and interstate travel restrictions in Texas led the Venom and the West Texas Warbirds to withdraw from participating in the 2021 CIF season. The Venom and Warbirds instead launched the Lone Star Series, a series of games between the two CIF Texas teams and a few other Texas-based semiprofessional teams. Amarillo lost the series championship game to West Texas, 79–60.

Amarillo and West Texas officially left the CIF and turned their Lone Star Series from the previous season into the Arena Football Association (AFA) in November 2021. The new league also announced its initial membership consisting of former Lone Star Series member Texas Jets, former American Arena League champions North Texas Bulls, the dormant Rio Grande Valley Dorados, and the Texas Crude.

On February 17, 2022, team co-owner Stephanie Tucker announced the team had withdrawn from participating in the AFA for the 2022 season and that the team was for sale.

==== American Indoor Football (2024) ====
On August 24, 2023, the AIF announced that the Venom would return and join the AIF for the 2024 season. The team finished a very successful season led by new owner, Robert Reyna. However, have gone silent since May 24, 2024, among internal turmoil in AIF.

=== Return of... then folding of the Dusters (2025) ===
Originally known as the Amarillo Dusters. Rebranded back to the Dusters before folding in 2025.

On July 26, 2024, the Venom announced that they were rebranding back to their original name, the Amarillo Dusters. This in part due to the trademark previously held by the original Arena Football League has been allowed to elapse.

On August 20, 2024, the National Arena League announced that the Dusters were joining the league for the 2025 season. And on that same day, the team announced that Duane Bailey would become a new minority owner. However, on February 2, the Dusters were terminated as a member of the league, ostensibly due to not meeting league obligations. The owner of the Corpus Christi Tritons, another NAL member that had been dropped from the league on similar pretenses, stated that the Tritons, Dusters, and several other teams had been expelled from the league solely because the NAL could not assemble a schedule and book all of the necessary arenas for each date, and falsely blamed the teams for noncompliance when they had in fact complied with the NAL's requests.

Indoor football is scheduled to return to Amarillo in 2026 with an announced relocation and reactivation of the West Texas Warbirds.

=== Bayou Bucks (2027 and beyond) ===
On January 23, 2026, the Dusters announced at their Facebook page that they were relocating from Texas to Louisiana for the 2027 season and beyond. The next day, they officially rebranded as the Bayou Bucks. On April 9, the team announced James Shivers as the inaugural coach.

== Season-by-season results ==
League champions	Conference champions	Division champions	Playoff berth	League leader

Season	Team	League	Conference	Division	Regular season			Postseason results
Season	Team	League	Conference	Division	Finish	Wins	Losses	Postseason results
2004	2004	IFL			1st	13	3	Won Semifinals (San Angelo) 41–29; Won Intense Bowl I (Lubbock) 62–47
2005	2005	AF2	National	Midwest	4th	8	8	Won National Conference Quarterfinals (Oklahoma City) 59–56; Lost National Conference Semifinals (Memphis) 30–71
2006	2006	AF2	National	Midwest	5th	4	12	Did not qualify
2007	2007	AF2	National	Central	4th	3	13	Did not qualify
2008	2008	AF2	National	Central	3rd	8	8	Won National Conference Quarterfinals (Tulsa) 65–62; Won National Conference Semifinals (Bossier-Shreveport) 59–45; Lost National Conference Championship (Spokane) 49–79
2009	2009	AF2	National	Central	3rd	3	13	Did not qualify
2010	2010	IFL	Intense	Lonestar West	1st	11	3	Won Intense Conference Quarterfinals (West Texas) 56–36; Lost Intense Conference Semifinals (Arkansas) 31–46
2011	2011	IFL	Intense	Lonestar	3rd	4	10	Did not qualify
2012	2012	LSFL			1st	10	4	Won Semifinals (West Texas) 56–42; Won Lone Star Bowl I (Rio Grande Valley) 62–40
2013	2013	LSFL			2nd	7	5	Won Semifinals (Abilene) 70–42; Won Lone Star Bowl II (Laredo) 70–69
2014	2014	LSFL				5	7	Did not qualify
2015	2015	CIF			6th	7	5	Lost Semifinals (Sioux City) 52–83
2016	2016	CIF		Southern	2nd	8	4	Won Southern Division Semifinals (Dodge City) 98–56; Won Southern Division Championship (Texas) 57–53; Lost Champions Bowl II (Wichita) 48–45
2017	2017	CIF	South		1st	9	3	Won South Conference Semifinal (Duke City) 70–41; Lost Southern Conference Championship (Texas) 71–77
2018	2018	CIF	South		2nd	8	4	Lost South Conference Semifinal (Texas) 45–56
2019	2019	CIF	South		2nd	8	4	Lost South Conference Championship (Duke City) 62–70
2020	2020	CIF	Season cancelled due to the COVID-19 pandemic					
2021	2021	LSS			2nd	3	2	Won Semifinal (Texas) 49–15; Lost Lone Star Series Championship (West Texas) 60–79
2022	Dormant year							
2023	Dormant year							
2024	2024	AIF				1	4	
Totals						120	112	All-time regular season record
Totals						14	9	All-time postseason record
Totals						134	121	All-time regular season and postseason record

== Awards and honors ==
Season	Player	Position	Award
2013	Nate Davis	QB	LSFL Championship MVP

== Head coaches ==
Note: Statistics are correct through the 2025 National Arena League season.

Name	Tenure	Regular season			Playoffs		Awards
Name	Tenure	W	L	Win%	W	L	Awards
Don Carthel	2004–2005	14	4	.778	2	0	
Steve Perdue	2005–2007	14	32	.304	1	1	
Chris MacKeown	2008	8	8	.500	2	1	
Ben Bennett	2009	3	13	.188	0	0	
Jon Lyles	2010	11	3	.786	1	1	
Rodney Blackshear	2011	0	9	.000	0	0	
Julian Reese	2011–2021	69	39	.639	8	6	
Rick Kranz	2024	1	4	.200	0	0	
Trae Ivory	2025–future	0	0	–	0	0	
