= Lubbock Gunslingers =

American indoor football team

General information
- Founded: 2004
- Folded: 2006
- Headquartered: Lubbock, Texas at the Lubbock Municipal Coliseum
- Colors: Black, red, silver, white

Personnel
- General manager: Tommy Selby

Team history
- Lubbock Lone Stars (2004); Lubbock Gunslingers (2005–2006)

Home fields
- Lubbock Municipal Coliseum (2004–2005)

League / conference affiliations
- Intense Football League (2004); National Indoor Football League (2005–2006)

The Lubbock Gunslingers were a professional indoor football team. They played their home games in Lubbock, Texas, at Lubbock Municipal Coliseum.

The Gunslingers played in 2004 as a charter member of the Intense Football League when they were known as the Lubbock Lone Stars, receiving some criticism locally as it was felt that the phrase Lone Star should not be pluralized. Besides that, they ended their inaugural year at 9–7 and won over the Odessa Roughnecks in the Semifinals, yet lost to the Amarillo Dusters in Intense Bowl I.

Following their sole year in the IFL, the team joined the NIFL for the 2005 season, where they finished with a lackluster 4–10 record, but still finished second in the Pacific North Division.

New ownership was unable to begin play in 2006. Most of the team's regional travel partners bolted for the reorganized Intense Football League, while the Gunslingers had chosen to remain in the NIFL and wait another season to restart the team.

Some of the original members of the Lone Stars include QB George Godsey and WR Anton Paige. The original voice of the team's radio play-by-play and the head of its public relations was Greg Rankin.

== af2 ==
Later in 2006, in a move that essentially spelled the end for the Gunslingers, the rights to play indoor football in the Coliseum were sold to Texas af2 Holdings, LLC, who also manages the Laredo Lobos, Texas Copperheads, and the Corpus Christi Sharks. An af2 expansion team, the Lubbock Renegades, began play in 2007.

== Season-by-season ==
Season records
| Season | W | L | T | Finish | Playoff results |
|---|---|---|---|---|---|
Lubbock Lone Stars (IFL)
| 2004 | 9 | 7 | 0 | 2nd League | Won Semifinal (Odessa); Lost Intense Bowl I (Amarillo) |
Lubbock Gunslingers (NIFL)
| 2005 | 4 | 10 | 0 | 2nd Pacific North | – |
| 2006 | Did not play | | | | |
| Totals | 14 | 18 | 0 | (including playoffs) | |
