= Hyde Park Schools =

Location
- 11400 N Mopac Expy; Austin, Texas 78759; United States; 30.408215°N 97.731984°W

Information
- Type: Private
- Motto: We believe that Hyde Park Schools exists to glorify God through the ministry of an excellent Christ-centered education.
- Established: 1968 (Primary School) / 1980 (High School)
- Authorizer: Emery
- Enrollment: 730-760
- Campus: Two
- Website: Official site

Hyde Park Schools is a private Christian school K-12 located in Austin, Texas. Hyde Park has two campuses: the Speedway Campus for 4K through 8th grades campus and the Quarries Campus for upper school.

== History ==
Hyde Park Schools was founded as a child development center in 1968 by the Hyde Park Baptist Church in Austin, Texas. Hyde Park has a college-preparatory program that emphasizes Christian values.

== Campuses ==
Hyde Park Schools is a ministry of Hyde Park Baptist Church in Austin, Texas. The Upper School is located at 11400 N. Mopac, Austin, It moved to this location in the fall of 2009. Before this time it was located at 3901 Speedway with the Lower and Middle School campuses.

== Extracurricular activities ==
=== Sports ===
Hyde Park athletics is led by the executive director of Athletics, Louise Swain.

- Football
- Volleyball
- Basketball (Boys and Girls)
- Cross Country (Boys and Girls)
- Track
- Soccer (Boys and Girls)
- Golf
- Baseball
- Softball
- Tennis (Boys and Girls)
- Cheerleading
- Soccer (Boys and Girls)
- Flag Football
- Men’s Lacrosse
- Cheerleading

=== Fine arts ===
- Prancers (Drill team)
