= Louisiana Swashbucklers =

Logo

General information
- Founded: 2005
- Folded: 2013
- Headquartered: Lake Charles, Louisiana at the Sudduth Coliseum
- Colors: Black, Purple, Silver

Personnel
- Owner: Kyle Thorne
- General manager: Chris Meaux
- Head coach: Darnell Lee

Team history
- Southwest Louisiana Swashbucklers (2005); Louisiana Swashbucklers (2005–2013)

Home fields
- Sudduth Coliseum (2005–2013)

League / conference affiliations
- National Indoor Football League (2005): Pacific Conference (2005); Southern Division (2005); Intense Football League (2006–2008); Southern Indoor Football League (2009–2011): Western Conference (2011); Gulf Division (2011); Professional Indoor Football League (2012–2013)

Championships
- League championships: 3 Intense 2007, 2008 SIFL 2009
- Conference championships: 1 SIFL 2011
- Division championships: 2 NIFL 2005, SIFL 2011

Playoff appearances (8)
- NIFL 2005 Intense 2006, 2007, 2008 SIFL 2009, 2010, 2011 PIFL 2012

The Louisiana Swashbucklers were a professional indoor football team based in Lake Charles, Louisiana. They were formed in 2005 as an expansion member of the National Indoor Football League (NIFL) and were originally known as the Southwest Louisiana Swashbucklers. They replaced another NIFL franchise, the Lake Charles Land Sharks. In 2006, they moved to the Intense Football League (IFL) and shortened their name to Louisiana Swashbucklers. They were originally set to play in the Indoor Football League due to the IFL's merger with United Indoor Football, but later had to bow out over financial concerns. For their next three seasons, they were a member of the new Southern Indoor Football League. Later a member of the Professional Indoor Football League, they played their home games at Sudduth Coliseum in Lake Charles, Louisiana. On May 24, 2013, the team announced that they would be ceasing operations due to low turnout and cancelled the team's final home game.

== All-league players ==
- FB Kendrick Perry (2)
- WR Jordan Rideaux (2)
- OL Roman Pritt
- DL John Paul Jones
- DB Damian Huren (2)

== Season-by-season results ==
League champions	Conference champions	Division champions	Wild card berth	League leader

Season	Team	League	Conference	Division	Regular season				Postseason results
Season	Team	League	Conference	Division	Finish	Wins	Losses	Ties	Postseason results
2005	2005	NIFL	Pacific	Southern	1st	10	4	0	Lost Round 1 (Corpus Christi) 29-31
2006	2006	Intense			3rd	8	6	0	Lost Semifinals (Odessa) 50-53
2007	2007	Intense			1st	13	1	0	Won Semifinals (Odessa) 43-40; Won Intense Bowl III (Corpus Christi) 46-27
2008	2008	Intense			1st	14	0	0	Won Semifinals (Odessa) 59-57; Won Intense Bowl IV (Corpus Christi) 66-35
2009	2009	SIFL			1st	10	1	0	Won Semifinal (Houma) 51-40; Won President's Cup I (Austin) 59-38
2010	2010	SIFL			4th	5	6	0	Won Semifinal (Albany) 41-35; Lost President's Cup II (Columbus) 13-68
2011	2011	SIFL	Western	Gulf	1st	8	4	0	Won Round 1 (Corpus Christi) 59-20; Won Western Conference Championship (Houston) 56-41; Lost Presidents Cup III (Albany) 48-69
2012	2012	PIFL			4th	6	6		Lost Semifinals (Richmond) 50-56
2013	2013	PIFL			5th	5	6		
Totals						79	34	0	All-time regular season record (2006–2013)
Totals						9	5	-	All-time postseason record (2006–2013)
Totals						88	39	0	All-time regular season and postseason record (2006–2013)
