= CenTex Barracudas =

Texas profession indoor football team

- Founded: 2005
- League: Intense Football League
- Team history: Intense 2006–2008
- Based in: Belton, Texas
- Arena: Bell County Expo Center
- Colors: Black, red, blue
- President: Frederick Barnett
- Head coach: Chris Duliban
- Championships: 0
- Dancers: Barracudas Babes

The CenTex Barracudas (also known as the Central Texas Barracudas) was a professional indoor football team based out of Belton, Texas. They competed in the Intense Football League. They played their home games at Bell County Expo Center.

They began their history in 2006 as an expansion team in the Intense Football League. They went 8–6 in their first season, but lost in the semifinals to Corpus Christi. In 2007, the team finished 2–12, just avoiding last place. Their 2008 campaign started off shaky, but then the team added former Texas Longhorn quarterback James Brown, who helped lead the Cudas to their second playoff appearance and first playoff win, against Alaska. CenTex then faced Corpus Christi in the semifinal once again, and lost.

After the 2008 season, the IFL merged with the United Indoor Football League to form the Indoor Football League. Owner/president Dr. Frederick Barnett pulled the team out of the new IFL in the hope of joining the Southern Indoor Football League, which would retain the IFL's regional approach, and sought financial partners to keep the team afloat. In early 2009, concerned in part about the future of the team, head coach Chris Duliban and six key players from the 2008 Barracudas' team left for the Austin Turfcats. Finding no local financial partners, the team eventually folded.

== Season-by-season ==
Season records
Season	W	L	T	Finish	Playoff results
CenTex Barracudas (Intense Football League)
2006	8	6	0	3rd League	Lost Semifinal (Corpus Christi)
2007	2	12	0	7th League	–
2008	8	6	0	3rd League	Won Round 1 (Alaska); Lost Semifinal (Corpus Christi)
Totals	19	26	0	(including playoffs)	
