= Frisco Thunder =

- Founded: 2006
- League: Intense Football League
- Based in: Frisco, Texas
- Arena: Dr Pepper Arena
- Colors: Green, gold
- President: Jake & Vinita Reed
- Head coach: Troy Espirit
- Dancers: Frisco Thunder Dance Team
- Mascot: Crash the ThunderCat

The Frisco Thunder was an indoor football team in Frisco, Texas. They were members of the Intense Football League and played their home games at the Dr Pepper Arena.

The Thunder began play in the Intense Football League. As an expansion team, they made the playoffs and finished with a record of 8–6. Their second season was more disappointing, which ended with a 6–8 record and a first round playoff loss to the Odessa Roughnecks. The team also had the distinction of playing the first half of the 2008 season at home and the remaining seven games consecutively on the road due to construction on their home arena.

For the 2009 season, the Intense Football League merged with United Indoor Football to create another version of the Indoor Football League. With construction continuing on Dr Pepper Arena into the 2009 season, the Thunder opted to sit the season out and did not participate in the 2009 IFL season. However, the team never returned for any other season.

The team was owned by former Minnesota Vikings and New Orleans Saints Jake Reed, who purchased the team during the 2007 season.

== Season-by-season ==
Season records
Season	W	L	T	Finish	Playoff results
Frisco Thunder
2007	8	6	0	Lost Semifinals	Corpus Christi 55, Frisco 41
2008	6	8	0	Lost Round 1	Odessa 67, Frisco 33
Totals	14	16	0	(including playoffs)	

Frisco Thunder logo (proposed)

Frisco Thunder (2007)

Frisco Thunder (2008)
