= Corpus Christi Fury =

American indoor football team

Logo

General information
- Founded: 2003
- Folded: 2016
- Headquartered: Corpus Christi, Texas at the American Bank Center
- Colors: Navy, White, Bright Green, Silver
- CCFury.com

Personnel
- Owner: Chad Dittman
- CEO: Chad Dittman
- General manager: Robert Wehling
- Head coach: LaDaniel Marshall
- President: Chad Dittman

Nickname
- Fury

Team history
- Corpus Christi Hammerheads (2004–2012); Corpus Christi Fury (2013–2016)

Home fields
- American Bank Center (2003-2016)

League / conference affiliations
- Intense Football League (2004, 2006–2008) National Indoor Football League (2005); Indoor Football League (2009–2010); Southern Indoor Football League (2011); Lone Star Football League (2012); Ultimate Indoor Football League (2013–2014); X-League Indoor Football (2015) American Indoor Football (2016)

Championships
- League championships: 1 UIFL: 2014

Playoff appearances (8)
- 2005, 2006, 2007, 2008, 2010, 2011, 2013, 2014

The Corpus Christi Fury (formerly the Corpus Christi Hammerheads), was a professional indoor football team based in Corpus Christi, Texas, United States. The Fury played its home games at the American Bank Center.

== History ==
The Fury began life as the Corpus Christi Hammerheads, a charter member of the Intense Football League. The Hammerheads were coached by ex-University of Houston Quarterback and former IFL star Jason McKinley, son of former NFL player Bob McKinley, and were led by a strong supporting cast of players such as quarterback Wes Cooper, wide receiver Shomari Buchanan, tight end Matt Ross, and linebackers Roy Salas and DeAndrae Filmore. They played their home games at the Memorial Coliseum in 2004 and at the American Bank Center in 2005 and 2006, both of which are in Corpus Christi, Texas.

The team did not return to the American Bank Center for 2007 after the arena decided not to renew the team's lease and it became the home of the af2 team, the Corpus Christi Sharks. In 2007, the Hammerheads played in the Central Pavilion Arena in nearby Robstown, Texas. In 2008, head coach Jason McKinley guided the Hammerheads back to the Intense Football League's title game only to lose 65–36 in Lake Charles, Louisiana to the Louisiana Swashbucklers. After the Sharks folded following the 2009 season the Hammerheads announced they were returning to the American Bank Center for the upcoming 2010 season.

For the 2011 season, the Hammerheads joined the Southern Indoor Football League. Finishing at 7–5, the Hammerheads lost to the Louisiana Swashbucklers in the first round of the playoffs. After the 2011 season, the Hammerheads left the SIFL to help start the Lone Star Football League.

The team was removed from the Lone Star Football League following the 2012 season. In 2013, the team played in the Ultimate Indoor Football League and renamed as the Corpus Christi Fury (the logos were originally designed for a proposed 2012 UIFL expansion team, the Danville Dragons).

The fury fell to the Florida Tarpons in Ultimate Bowl III, but returned to the Ultimate Bowl in 2014. The team defeated the Tarpons 60–23 to claim their first championship in franchise history.

For the 2015 season, the Fury played in the X-League after the UIFL ceased operations. The Fury also was winless that season.

On October 1, 2015, the Fury joined American Indoor Football after the X-League folded. The team's coach remained LaDaniel Marshall working under general manager Robert Wehling and owner, Chad Dittman. The team cancelled several games during the 2016 season and only played one game against another AIF member. While never announced by the team, the Fury appeared to have folded before their May 15, 2016, game against the New Mexico Stars, giving the Stars 24 hours' notice that they would be unable to make the game. They also announced their May 22 home game was cancelled over social media on the day of the game without explanation.

=== Post-Fury ===
The Fury were removed from the AIF website after the completion of the 2016 season. AIF also ceased all operations in July 2016. In October, a new indoor football team was announced to begin play in 2017 out of the American Bank Center called the Corpus Christi Rage. The new team had no connection to the former Hammerheads/Fury franchise and was a member of the new National Arena League. The Rage, however, also went winless and failed to complete the 2017 season. The Hammerheads hold the record for most Intense Bowls played, but lost all three games. In 2024, the third team to play in the city is the Corpus Christi Tritons, who started as an expansion team in American Indoor Football and were runners-up in that league's championship. That team later moved to Arena Football One in 2025.

== Season-by-season ==
Season records
Season	W	L	T	Finish	Playoff results
Corpus Christi Hammerheads (Intense Football League)
2004	8	8	0	5th League	—
Corpus Christi Hammerheads (NIFL)
2005	8	6	0	2nd Pacific South	Won PC Quarterfinal (S.W. Louisiana); Lost PC Semifinal (Odessa)
Corpus Christi Hammerheads (Intense Football League)
2006	9	5	0	2nd League	Won Semifinal (Centex); Lost Intense Bowl II (Odessa)
2007	12	2	0	2nd League	Won Semifinal (Frisco); Lost Intense Bowl III (Louisiana)
2008	10	4	0	2nd League	Won Semifinal (CenTex); Lost Intense Bowl IV (Louisiana)
Corpus Christi Hammerheads (Indoor Football League)
2009	5	9	0	4th Intense Lone Star	—
2010	6	8	0	3rd Intense Lone Star	Lost Round 1 (Arkansas)
Corpus Christi Hammerheads (SIFL)
2011	7	5	0	2nd WC Southwest	Lost WC Round 1 (Louisiana)
Corpus Christi Hammerheads (LSFL)
2012	4	7	0	5th League	—
Corpus Christi Fury (UIFL)
2013	6	1	0	2nd League	Lost Ultimate Bowl III (Florida)
2014	5	0	0	1st League	Won Ultimate Bowl IV (Florida)
Corpus Christi Fury (X-League)
2015	0	6	0	9th League	—
Corpus Christi Fury (AIF)
2016	2	1	0	—	—
Totals	86	69	0	(including IFL, NIFL, SIFL, UIFL, X-League & AIF playoffs)	

2016 AIF Western Standings
Team	W	L	PCT
y – New Mexico Stars	6	1	.857
Corpus Christi Fury	2	1	.667
Steel City Menace	0	2	.000

== Notable players ==
See Category:Corpus Christi Fury players
