= Intense Football League =

U.S.-based indoor football league

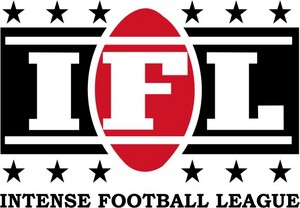
- Intense Football League logo
- Sport: Indoor football
- Founded: 2003
- Folded: 2008
- Commissioner: Chad Dittman
- No. of teams: 9
- Country: USA
- Venues: Texas; Louisiana
- Last champion: Louisiana Swashbucklers

The Intense Football League (IFL) was a professional indoor football minor league that began operations in 2004. Its focus was in Texas, but it was notable for being the first professional football league to place a franchise in Alaska.

== History ==
During its first season, the El Paso Rumble folded and the league oversaw operations of the team until the end of the season. In 2005, the Amarillo Dusters left for the AF2, while the other teams joined the National Indoor Football League and the league suspended operations. In 2006, the Intense Football League restarted. Three of the original teams (Odessa, San Angelo and Corpus Christi) returned to the IFL, joined by new teams from Belton, Lake Charles, and Laredo.

Following the 2006 season, the Laredo Lobos left for AF2, but the league expanded with three new teams for 2007 in the Frisco Thunder, Katy Ruff Riders, and Alaska Wild (notable for being the first ever professional football team in the state of Alaska). For 2008 another Alaskan team was added with the Fairbanks Grizzlies. The league planned to add a team in El Paso for 2009.

On July 22, 2008, the IFL announced that, following the National Indoor Bowl Championship between both leagues' champions on August 2, it would merge with United Indoor Football for the upcoming 2009 season. On August 1 it was announced the new league would be called Indoor Football League.

== Seasons ==
- 2004
- 2006
- 2007
- 2008

== All-time IFL teams ==
- Alaska Wild (2007–2008)
- Amarillo Dusters (2004)
- CenTex Barracudas (2006–2008)
- Corpus Christi Hammerheads (2004, 2006–2008)
- El Paso Rumble (2004)
- Fairbanks Grizzlies (2008)
- Frisco Thunder (2007–2008)
- Katy Ruff Riders (2007–2008)
- Laredo Lobos (2006)
- Louisiana Swashbucklers (2006–2008)
- Lubbock Lone Stars (2004)
- Odessa Roughnecks (2004, 2006–2008)
- San Angelo Stampede Express (2004, 2006–2008)

== See also ==
- Intense Bowl
