= West Texas Roughnecks =

- Founded: 2004
- Folded: 2013
- Team history: Odessa Roughnecks (2004–2009); West Texas Roughnecks (2010–2012)
- Based in: Odessa, Texas at the Ector County Coliseum
- Home arena: Ector County Coliseum (2004-2012)
- Mascot: Digger
- League: Intense Football League (2004, 2006–2008); National Indoor Football League (2005); Indoor Football League (2009–2011); Lone Star Football League (2012)
- Colors: Black, Blue, Tan, White

Personnel
- Head coach: Chris Williams
- Team president: Jay and Dale Morris
- Owners: Jay and Dale Morris

Championships
- League titles (1): 2006

Playoff appearances (2)
- 2011, 2012

The West Texas Roughnecks were a professional indoor football team based in Odessa, Texas that plays in the Lone Star Football League. The team's nickname was a tribute to the oil industry, which has been the source of Odessa's wealth over the past century.

The team began operations in 2004 as the Odessa Roughnecks, a charter member of the Intense Football League (IFL). In 2005, the IFL merged with the NIFL. For the 2006 season, the IFL was resurrected, and the Odessa Roughnecks returned to their original league. In 2008 the Intense Football League merged again, this time with the UIF to create the Indoor Football League.

The team played its home games at the Ector County Coliseum in Odessa. The team was sold by its original owner (Tommy Benizio) in September 2008 to Allegiance Pro Sports, Inc. In January 2010, Dale and Jay Morris of Midland, Texas purchased the Roughnecks from Allegiance Pro Sports.

The Roughnecks were coached by Chris Williams. The 2011 season was Coach Williams's eighth season with the Roughnecks.

The Roughnecks won its first championship in 2006 at Intense Bowl 2 by beating the Corpus Christi Hammerheads 97–56, which was an Intense Football League record for most points scored by one team in a game. The team finished with an overall record of 14–2.

Up through the 2009 season games were broadcast on KMCM, and KQRX broadcast the games in 2009–2011. With the LSFL having games available online through America One, no radio contract was made during the 2012 season.

For the 2012 season, the Roughnecks moved to the Lone Star Football League. After the 2012 season, the team was put up for sale and never purchased. It was announced on October 16, 2013, that a new team would replace the Roughnecks at the Ector County Coliseum in 2014 – the West Texas Wildcatters. Like the Roughnecks did in their last season, the Wildcatters competed in the LSFL.

== History ==
In 2003, the nearly 20-year-old Arena Football League, which until then had been primarily in major markets like New York City and Chicago, began spreading across the nation into smaller to middle-sized cities. Jerry Jones of the NFL's Dallas Cowboys kicked off his AFL franchise in Dallas and secured the rights to every smaller market in the state of Texas with a suitable arena for indoor football. When Jones could not be reached to discuss selling these rights, a new league was formed throughout the state. In August 2003, Chad Dittman, President of the fledgling Intense Football League announced that Odessa would be one of the sites for his new professional indoor football league.

Through prayer shortly after, Abby and Tommy Benizio decided to purchase the franchise and moved to the Permian Basin along with their pet prairie dogs. By the close of 2003, the franchise creatively announced the name of "Roughnecks" along with the unveiling of a logo fit for the community and a mascot who has become a staple in both Odessa and Midland known as Digger.

The team kicked off on May 8, 2004, under the direction of head coach Chris Williams, who led the team to a 9–7 record and home field advantage in the playoffs. Lubbock defeated Odessa in overtime just one game shy of the championship but the season did not end without the success of leading the IFL in attendance and having promoted more players to the next level than any other team in the league.

This success became well known throughout the national football community, and along with the hard work of the teams coaches, Odessa enjoyed a very rare undefeated regular season in the National Indoor Football League in 2005. Despite losing one game shy of the championship again, the Roughnecks were once more atop of their league in attendance, successfully hosted the first ever NIFL All-Star Game, and could boast a 16–1 overall record.

The team was later bought by Jay and Dale Morris of Midland, Texas, who changed the team name to the West Texas Roughnecks.

For the 2012 season, the Roughnecks joined the Lone Star Football League. After the season, the team was put up for sale. With no buyer stepping forward, the team officially folded in October 2013.

== Regular-season winning streak ==
The Roughnecks at one time held the longest regular-season winning streak in professional football history with 27 straight regular-season victories under the arm of Bobby Glenn Ruth Jr. The record was broken with a 55–35 win over the Laredo Lobos in Odessa on June 17, 2006, giving the Roughnecks 26 straight regular season wins. The streak began with a 20–0 victory against the San Angelo Stampede on July 31, 2004, in San Angelo, Texas and ended at 27 wins with a 70–63 loss against the Louisiana Swashbucklers on July 1, 2006, in Lake Charles, Louisiana. On March 29, 2008, the Sioux Falls Storm of the United Indoor Football League lost to the Omaha Beef 34–18, ending their historic 40-game winning streak and giving them their first loss since July 15, 2005. They went on to win their fourth United Bowl later that season against the Bloomington Extreme.

== Season-by-season ==
Season records
Season	W	L	T	Finish	Playoff results
Odessa Roughnecks (Intense Football League)
2004	9	7	0	3rd League	Lost Semifinals (L. Lone Stars)
Odessa Roughnecks (NIFL)
2005	14	0	0	1st Pacific North	Won Pacific Conference Quarterfinal (Beaumont); Won Pacific Conference Semifinal (Corpus Christi); Lost Pacific Conference Final (Tri-Cities)
Odessa Roughnecks (Intense Football League)
2006	12	2	0	1st League	Won Semifinals (Louisiana); Won Intense Bowl II (Corpus Christi)
2007	8	6	0	4th League	Lost Semifinals (Louisiana)
2008	7	7	0	4th League	Won Round 1 (Frisco); Lost Semifinals (Louisiana)
Odessa Roughnecks (Indoor Football League)
2009	3	11	0	5th Intense Lone Star	--
West Texas Roughnecks (Indoor Football League)
2010	7	7	0	2nd Lonestar West	Lost Round 1 (Amarillo)
2011	10	4	0	2nd Lonestar	Lost Round 1 (Tri-Cities)
West Texas Roughnecks (LSFL)
2012	5	8	0	6th League	--
Totals	75	52	0	(Regular Season Only)	

== Head coach ==
2004–2012 - Chris Williams (74–47)
