= 2012 American Indoor Football season =

- League: American Indoor Football
- Sport: Indoor football

AIF Championship Bowl V
- Champions: Cape Fear Heroes
- Runners-up: California Eagles

AIF seasons
- ← 2011 2013 →

The 2012 American Indoor Football season was the league's seventh overall season, and first under the AIF name. AIF Championship Bowl V was won by the Cape Fear Heroes who defeated the California Eagles and completed a perfect 9–0 record (including playoffs).

== Summary ==
=== Nevada Lynx ===
The Nevada Lynx were a professional indoor football team that played in 2012. They competed in only four games during their brief existence. Their inaugural game was on March 6, 2012, on the road against the Arizona Outlaws, but lost 40–13. One game was supposed to be played by the North Alameda Knights, but the Lynx stepped in. Then they competed in two early-season matchups against Arizona and Ontario, but then was shutout 92–0 and fell 66–6 later in the season.

== Standings ==
Team	Overall		
Team	Wins	Losses	Percentage
Eastern Conference
Cape Fear Heroes	7	0	1.000
Harrisburg Stampede	6	1	.857
Carolina Force	3	3	.500
Maryland Reapers	1	5	.167
Macon Steel	1	4	.200
Tri-State Redhawks	1	3	.250
Virginia Badgers	0	3	.000
Western Conference
California Eagles	3	2	.600
Arizona Outlaws	1	4	.200
Nevada Lynx	0	4	.000
North Alameda Knights	0	0	–
Ontario Warriors	7	0	1.000

- Green indicates clinched playoff berth
- Purple indicates division champion
- Grey indicates suspended from league

== Playoffs ==
Conference Semifinals
3	Carolina	20
2	Harrisburg	68

Conference Championships
2	Harrisburg	32
1	Cape Fear	57

AIF Championship Bowl V
W1	California	27
E1	Cape Fear	79
