= California Eagles (AIF) =

US professional indoor football team

Logo

General information
- Founded: 2011
- Folded: 2012
- Headquartered: Stockton, California at the Stockton Arena
- Colors: Blue, Red, White

Personnel
- Owner: American Indoor Football
- Head coach: Bennie King
- President: Dan Whited

Team history
- California Eagles (2012)

Home fields
- Stockton Arena (2012)

League / conference affiliations
- American Indoor Football (2012): Western Division (2012)

Championships
- Conference championships: 1 Western, 2012

Playoff appearances (1)
- 2012

The California Eagles were a professional indoor football team based in Stockton, California. The team was a member of the Western Conference of American Indoor Football (AIF) during the 2012 season. The Eagles played their home games at the Stockton Arena. They are the third indoor team to play at Stockton Arena since the Stockton Lightning of af2 (2006–2009) and the Stockton Wolves (who were independent) (2011) and was preceded by the San Jose SaberCats of the Arena Football League in 2015 for that league's National Conference Championship game and Arena Bowl XXVIII.

== History ==
The Eagles became an expansion member of the re-branded American Indoor Football for the 2012 season. The Eagles were brought in by owner Dan Whited. The Eagles began the season 3–2, when the team suspended operations due to Whited failing to meet financial obligations. However, the Western Conference champion, Ontario Warriors, were suspended by the AIF, and the Eagles were thrown into the AIF Championship Game to play the Eastern Conference champions, the Cape Fear Heroes. The Eagles were defeated by the Heroes, 79–27.

== Statistics and records ==
=== Season-by-season results ===
Note: The finish, wins, losses, and ties columns list regular season results and exclude any postseason play.

| League champions | Conference champions | Division champions | Wild card berth | League leader |

| Season | Team | League | Conference | Division | Regular season | | | | Postseason results |
| Season | Team | League | Conference | Division | Finish | Wins | Losses | Ties | Postseason results |
|---|---|---|---|---|---|---|---|---|---|
| 2012 | 2012 | AIF | Western | | 2nd | 3 | 2 | 0 | Lost 2012 AIF Championship Game 27-79 (Cape Fear) |
| Totals | | | | | | 3 | 2 | 0 | All-time regular season record (2012) |
| Totals | | | | | | 0 | 1 | - | All-time postseason record (2012) |
| Totals | | | | | | 3 | 3 | 0 | All-time regular season and postseason record (2012) |

* Season currently in progress
