= Saluki Stadium =

Stadium in Illinois, USA

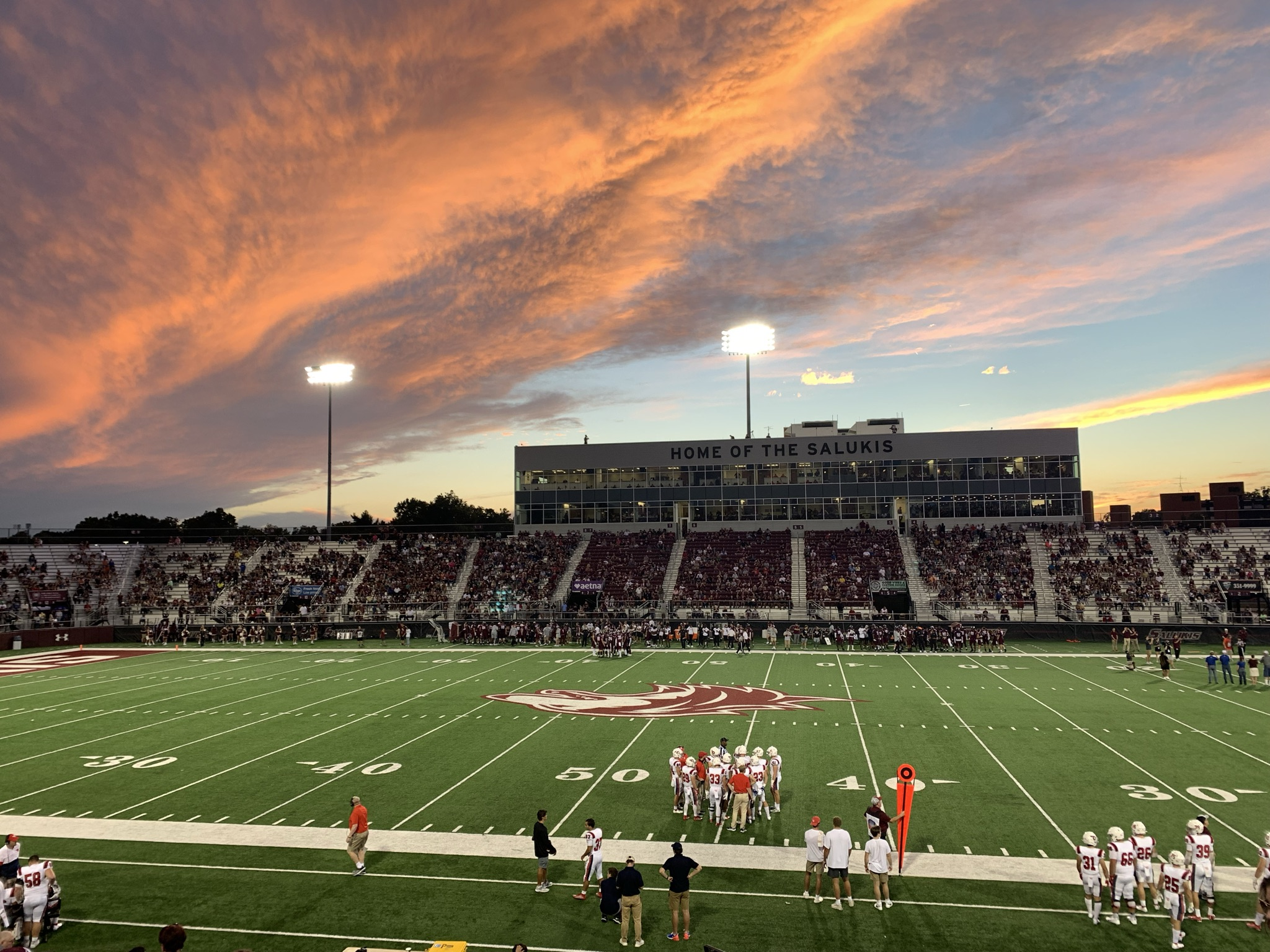
- Interactive map of Saluki Stadium
- Location: 2 Arena Drive; Carbondale, IL 62901
- Coordinates: 37.7086°N 89.2162°W
- Owner: Southern Illinois University Carbondale
- Operator: Southern Illinois University Carbondale
- Capacity: 15,000 (2010–present)
- Surface: FieldTurf

Construction
- Groundbreaking: March 3, 2009
- Opened: August 24, 2010
- Cost: $25.3 million ($37.4 million in 2025 dollars)
- Architects: 360 Architecture; Image Architects, Inc.
- Services engineers: Henneman Engineering, Inc.
- General contractor: J. E. Dunn/Holland

Tenant
- Southern Illinois Salukis (NCAA) (2010–present)

Saluki Stadium is a stadium on the campus of Southern Illinois University in Carbondale, Illinois. It is primarily utilized by the Southern Illinois Salukis football team.

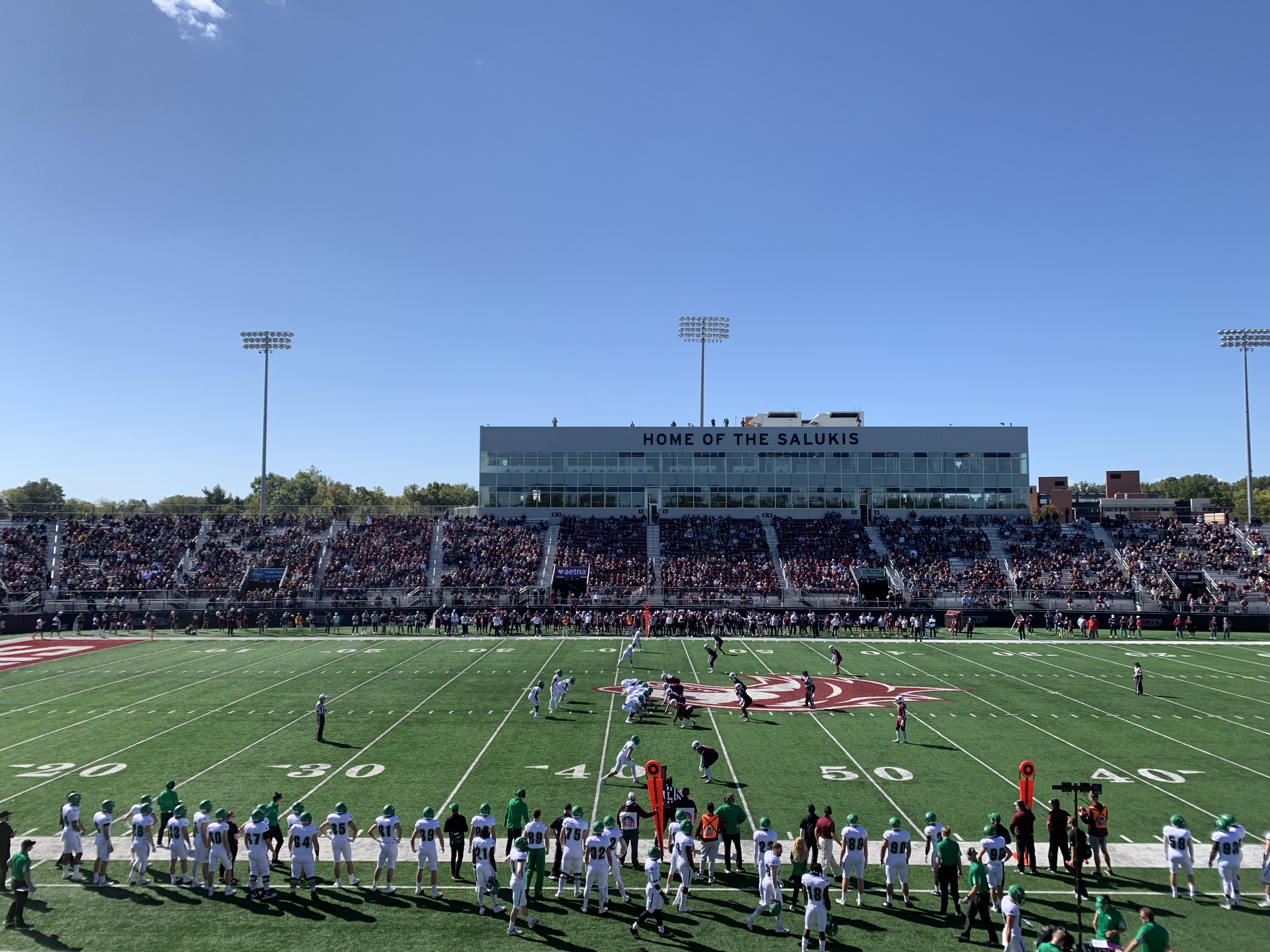
Saluki Stadium on October 16, 2021, vs North Dakota

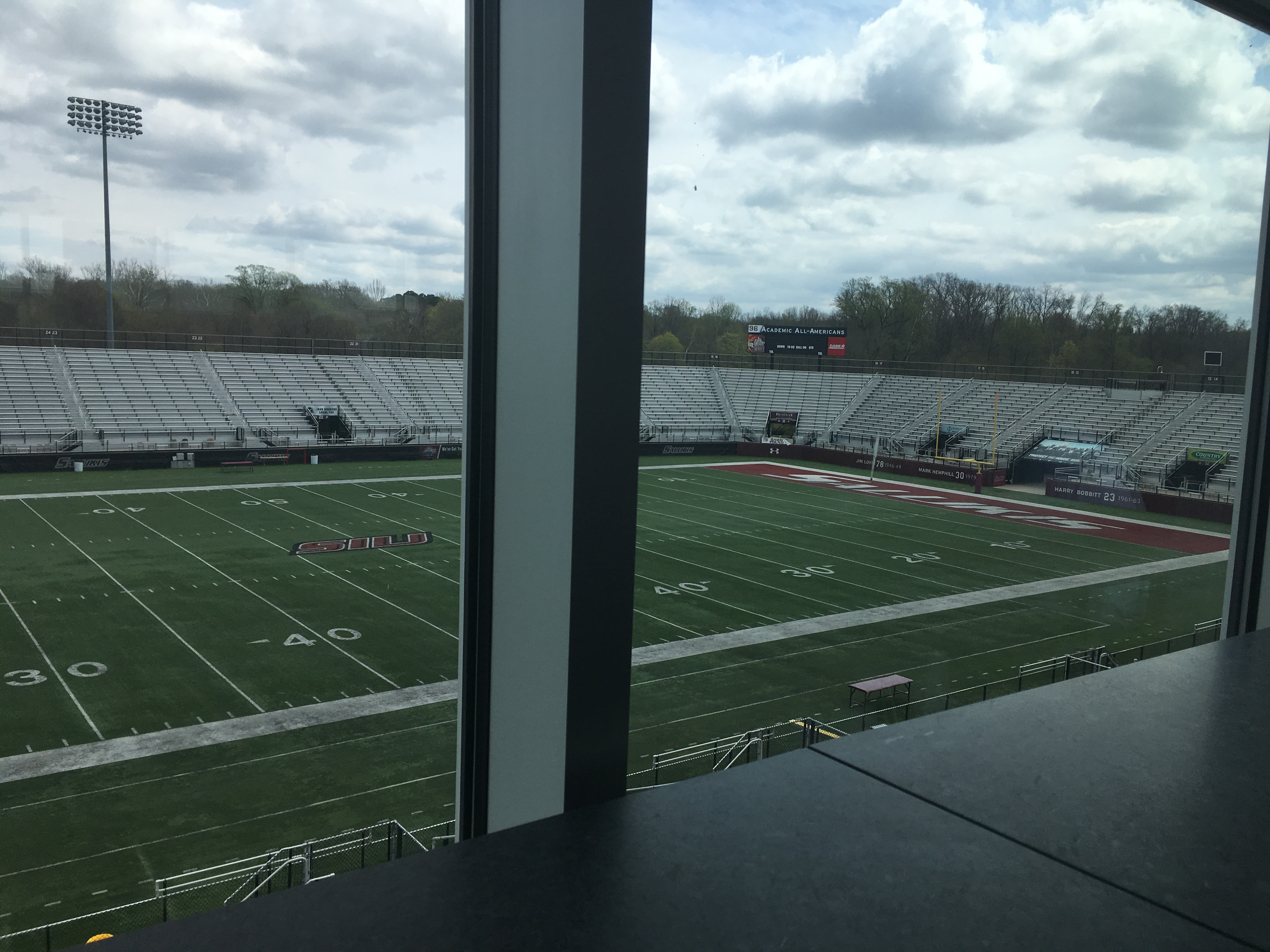
Saluki Stadium from the suites

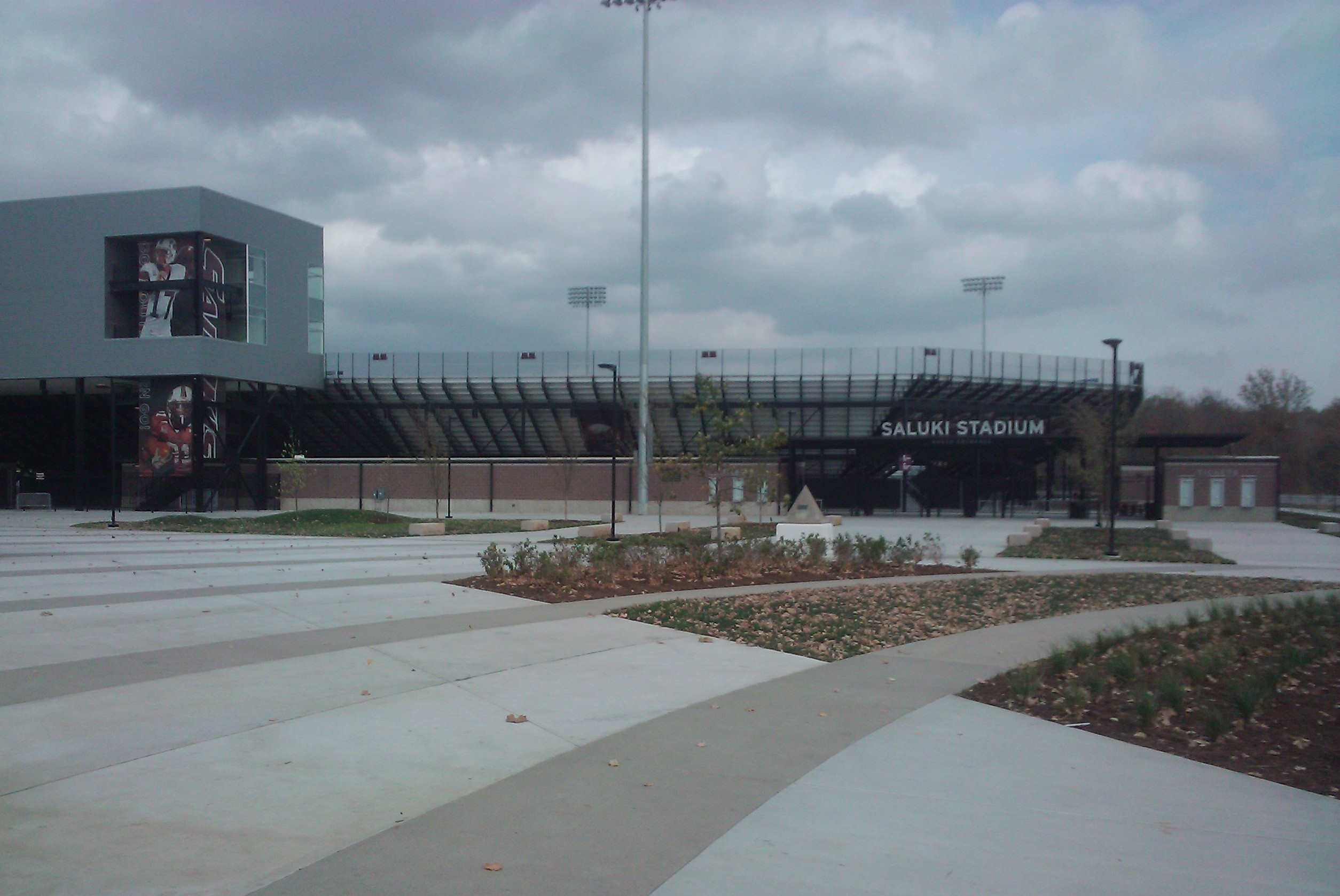
Saluki Stadium entrance

== History ==
Saluki Stadium was constructed to replace McAndrew Stadium which was built in 1938 and stood as the main track and football stadium for 73 years. The new stadium was completed in August 2010 and followed shortly thereafter by McAndrew Stadium's demolition in February 2011.

Saluki Stadium is part of the $83 million Saluki Way Project, which includes a major renovation to the 46-year-old SIU Arena and a new athletic support facility (that features new football offices and football locker rooms). The first event held at the stadium was an open house on August 24, 2010. Southern Illinois christened its new stadium on September 2, 2010, with a game against Quincy.

Saluki Stadium itself is valued at $29.9 million and has a capacity of 15,000. A Daktronics video board and a new FieldTurf were added in 2019.

The stadium hosted a large watch party for the August 21, 2017 solar eclipse and did the same for the April 8, 2024 solar eclipse.

== Features ==
The stadium's seating includes 1,080 seat-back chairs as well as a capacity for nearly 2,500 on the grass berm enclosing the north end zone. The two-story press box features 12 club suites, a 2,500-square-foot VIP Club Room, along with traditional booths for radio, television, coaches, and the print media. A 20-by-40-foot scoreboard with video replay capabilities in the north end zone and expanded concessions and restrooms enhance the fan experience.

== Attendance records ==
Rank	Attendance	Date	Game Result
1	15,276	September 2, 2010	5 Southern Illinois 70, Quincy 7
2	13,421	September 21, 2024	7 Southern Illinois 21, 21 Southeast Missouri State 38
3	13,356	October 9, 2010	21 Southern Illinois 45, 15 Northern Iowa 38 ^{OT}
4	13,271	September 24, 2011	14 Southern Illinois 20, Missouri State 18
5	13,170	September 27, 2014	17 Southern Illinois 34, Western Illinois 17
6	13,078	September 18, 2010	5 Southern Illinois 21, Southeast Missouri State 24
7	12,796	October 15, 2011	Southern Illinois 23, Youngstown State 35
8	12,166	September 29, 2012	Southern Illinois 3, Indiana State 24
9	11,927	October 21, 2023	12 Southern Illinois 10, 1 South Dakota State 17
10	11,886	September 26, 2015	Southern Illinois 34, 10 Liberty 13
11	11,408	September 28, 2013	Southern Illinois 27, Youngstown State 28
12	11,150	September 17, 2016	Southern Illinois 50, Murray State 17
13	11,136	October 16, 2010	15 Southern Illinois 10, South Dakota State 31
14	11,121	October 19, 2013	Southern Illinois 10, 1 North Dakota State 31
15	10,644	October 16, 2021	4 Southern Illinois 31, 22 North Dakota 28
16	10,575	October 13, 2012	Southern Illinois 34, Northern Iowa 31
17	10,385	September 13, 2014	20 Southern Illinois 50, Southeast Missouri State 23
18	10,359	September 30, 2023	10 Southern Illinois 33, Missouri State 20
19	10,255	October 25, 2014	20 Southern Illinois 26, 22 Indiana State 41
20	10,118	October 15, 2022	16 Southern Illinois 30, Western Illinois 7

== Design ==
360 Architecture and Image Architects, Inc. designed Saluki Stadium and J. E. Dunn Construction Group/Holland Construction Services Joint Venture is the general contractor.

== See also ==
- List of NCAA Division I FCS football stadiums
