= 2013 American Indoor Football season =

- League: American Indoor Football
- Sport: Indoor football
- Season MVP: Off: E. J. Nemeth (Harrisburg); Def: Jermaine Thaxton (Harrisburg)

Playoffs
- #1 Seed champions: Cape Fear Heroes
- #1 Seed runners-up: Bye
- Playoff champions: Harrisburg Stampede
- Playoff runners-up: York Capitals

2013 AIF Championship Game
- Champions: Harrisburg Stampede
- Runners-up: Cape Fear Heroes

AIF seasons
- ← 2012 2014 →

The 2013 American Indoor Football season was the eighth season of American Indoor Football (AIF). The Harrisburg Stampede defeated the Cape Fear Heroes 57–42 to win the 2013 AIF Championship.

== Standings ==
Team	Wins	Losses	Percentage
Cape Fear Heroes	7	1	.875
Harrisburg Stampede	6	2	.750
York Capitals	5	3	.625
West Virginia Badgers	0	4	.000
Washington Eagles	0	8	.000

- Green indicates clinched playoff berth
- Gray indicates best regular season record

== Playoffs ==
Wild Card			AIF Championship Bowl VI
			2	Harrisburg	57
3	York	41	1	Cape Fear	42
2	Harrisburg	51

== Awards ==
=== Individual season awards ===
Award	Winner	Position	Team
Offensive Player of the Year	E. J. Nemeth	Quarterback	Harrisburg Stampede
Defensive Player of the Year	Jermaine Thaxton	Linebacker	Harrisburg Stampede
Best Team Ownership	Marques Colston	Owner	Harrisburg Stampede
Best General Manager	Marques Colston	General Manager	Harrisburg Stampede
Coach of the Year	Bernie Nowortarski	Head coach	Harrisburg Stampede
Best Front Office	Harrisburg Stampede	Front Office	Harrisburg Stampede
Best Dance Team	Starletz	Dance Team	Harrisburg Stampede
Best Mascot	Harry	Mascot	Cape Fear Heroes
Best Game Day Staff	Cape Fear Heroes; Harrisburg Stampede	Game Day Staff	Cape Fear Heroes; Harrisburg Stampede

=== AIF All-Stars ===
Offense
Quarterback	E. J. Nemeth, Harrisburgh; Garrett Sutphen, Cape Fear; Kareem Dennis, Washington
Running back	Chris Johnson, Cape Fear; Victor Sesay, Harrisburgh; Brannon Hatley, Washington
Wide receiver	Colis Martin, Harrisburg; Jay Jackson, Cape Fear; Scorpio Brown, Harrisburg; Tim Jones, Cape Fear; Jerrell Jones, Harrisburg
Offensive lineman	Randall Bennett, Harrisburg; Jon Hall, Cape Fear; Jamall Williams, Cape Fear; Troy Bennett, Harrisburg; Steven Brazzle, Cape Fear

Defense
Defensive line	Daniel Orebar, Harrisburg; Jashawn Williams, Harrisburg; Fearon Wright, Harrisburg, Quincy Malloy, Cape Fear
Linebacker	Jerome Thaxton, Harrisburg; Marcus Hicks, Cape Fear; Vincent Tiberi, Harrisburg; Carlos Smith, Cape Fear
Defensive back	Amar Watson, Harrisburg; Jerome Mann, Cape Fear; Travis Proctor, Harrisburg; Archie Smith, York; Roger Williams, Cape Fear

Special teams
Kicker	Cap Poklemba, Harrisburg
Kick returner	Amar Watson, Harrisburg
