= 360 Architecture =

American architectural practice

Practice information
- Partners: George Heinlein, Brad Schrock, Bill Johnson, Tom Waggoner, Tracy Stearns, Chris Trainer
- Founded: 2004 (result of merger of CDFM^{2}Architecture Inc. (founded 1980) and Heinlein Schrock Stearns (founded 1995))
- Dissolved: 2015, merged into HOK
- Location: Kansas City, Missouri, United States

Significant works and honors
- Buildings: see article
- Projects: see article
- Design: see article

Website
- 360architects.com

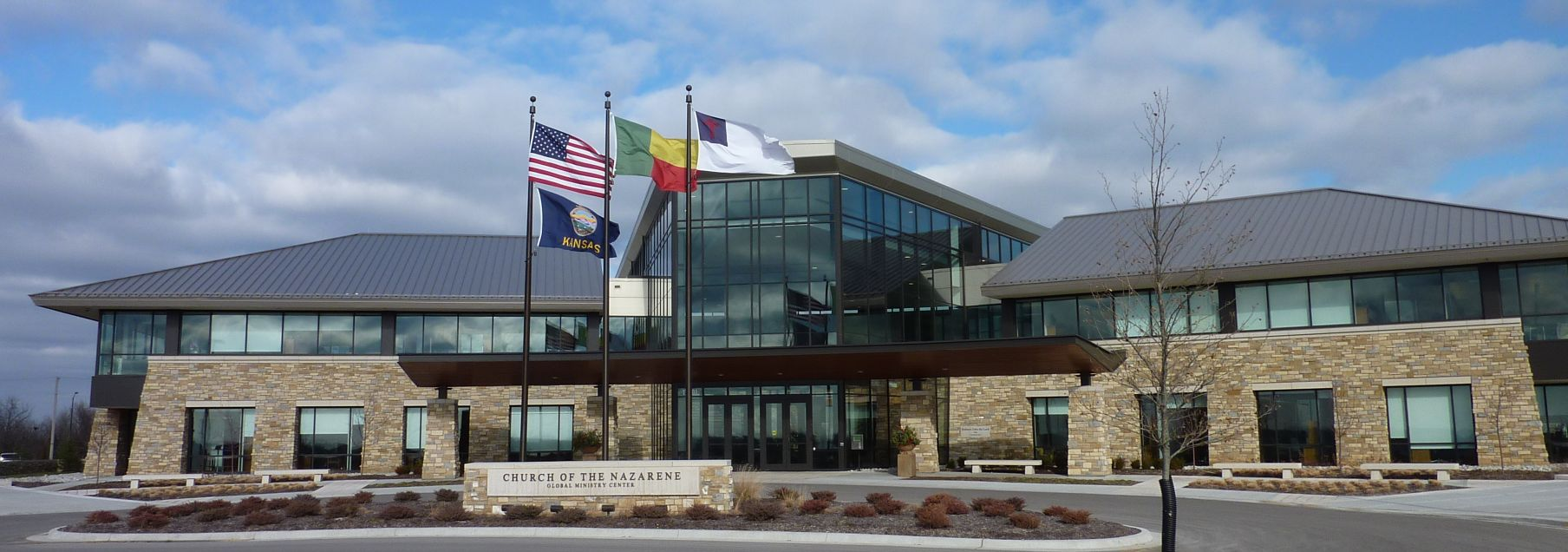
Church of the Nazarene headquarters in Lenexa

360 Architecture was an American architectural practice acquired by HOK in 2015. The firm provided services for a range of project types including corporate headquarters and commercial office buildings, sports arenas, stadiums and ballparks, municipal facilities, single- and multi-family residential, and mixed-use entertainment districts. The firm was headquartered in Kansas City, Missouri, with offices in Columbus Ohio; and San Francisco, California. As of 2014, the firm had a staff of 200 professionals.

In January 2015, HOK completed its acquisition of 360 Architecture for an undisclosed price and announced the launch of a new global Sports + Recreation + Entertainment practice. Brad Schrock, a 360 Architecture co-founder and a director of this new HOK practice, said the acquisition would help the firms compete at the highest level.

== History ==
CDFM^{2} Architecture Inc. and Heinlein Schrock Stearns merged in 2004 to form 360 Architecture. At the time, CDFM^{2} was a firm of sixty architects, interior architects, interior designers, 3D illustrators and graphic designers working in the corporate, developer service, government, and higher education markets. Heinlein Schrock Stearns was a firm of thirty-six architects and designers focused on collegiate, minor- and major-league sports and commercial, residential and retail/entertainment projects. The merger combined thirty-four years of firm experience into 360 Architecture (CDFM^{2} founded in 1980 and Heinlein Schrock Stearns founded in 1995).

== Recent activities ==
The firm worked on some of the largest sporting venues in the U.S., such as Avaya Stadium, home of the San Jose Earthquakes professional soccer team in San Jose, California, Husky Stadium in Seattle, Washington, home of the Washington Huskies football team, and MetLife Stadium in East Rutherford, New Jersey, home of the New York Giants and the New York Jets professional football teams. 360 Architecture was also a member of the Kansas City Downtown Arena Design Team (DADT). The DADT is the architect of record for the Sprint Center in downtown Kansas City.

360 Architecture is the designer for the thirteen-block revitalization project of downtown Kansas City. Other 360 Architecture projects in the downtown Kansas City area include the J.E. Dunn Construction Company corporate headquarters, the U.S. Internal Revenue Service Center and post office renovation, H&R Block world headquarters, and the Boulevard Brewing Company expansion.

== Selected projects ==
- TBD: New Downtown Tucson Arena
- 2017: Little Caesars Arena (home of Detroit Red Wings and Detroit Pistons)
- 2017: Mercedes Benz Stadium (home of Atlanta Falcons and Atlanta United FC)
- 2016: Rogers Place (home of Edmonton Oilers)
- 2015: Avaya Stadium (home of San Jose Earthquakes)
- 2013: Auburn University Recreation & Wellness Center
- 2013: Husky Stadium (home of Washington Huskies)
- 2013: Polsinelli Headquarters Kansas City, Missouri
- 2013: AMC Theatres Theatre Support Center in Leawood, Kansas
- 2010: New Meadowlands Stadium (home of New York Giants and New York Jets)
- 2010: Banterra Center renovation at Southern Illinois University
- 2010: Saluki Stadium at Southern Illinois University
- 2010: Auburn University's New Auburn Arena
- 2009: JE Dunn Construction Company headquarters
- 2009: Huntington Park (Columbus, Ohio)
- 2008: Kansas City Power & Light District
- 2008: Church of the Nazarene Global Ministry Center
- 2008: BB&T Arena at Northern Kentucky University (originally The Bank of Kentucky Center)
- 2007: Sprint Center
- 2007: Acrisure Bounce House
- 2007: Rent One Park
- 2006: H&R Block world headquarters
- 2006: Boulevard Brewing Company
- 2006: Miami University's Steve Cady Arena at the Goggin Ice Center
- 2006: University of Nebraska–Lincoln's Memorial Stadium renovation
- 2006: Nara Restaurant
- 2005: Stockton Arena
- 2005: University of Kansas Hall Center for the Humanities
- 2004: Kansas City International Airport terminals renovation
- 2004: Mizzou Arena
- 2004: Bernstein-Rein headquarters renovation
- 2004: Navy–Marine Corps Memorial Stadium renovation
- 2003: CommunityAmerica Ballpark
- 2003: Gaylord Family Oklahoma Memorial Stadium
- 2002: University of Dayton Arena
- 2002: Veterans Memorial Stadium (Cedar Rapids)
- 2001: Kansas City Southern headquarters - Cathedral Square
- 2000: Nationwide Arena
- 2000: Lockton Companies headquarters
- 1999: American Airlines Arena
- 1999: Safeco Field
- 1998: Kohl Center
- 1996: DST Systems headquarters
- 1994: Kansas City Downtown Airport renovation
- 1992: American Cancer Society headquarters

== Markets served ==
- mixed use
- corporate
- civic
- sports (collegiate & professional)
- recreation
- residential
- hospitality
- higher education

== Services ==
- Landscape architecture
- Visioning and strategic planning
- Master planning
- Building and site evaluation
- Code and Americans with Disabilities Act of 1990 (ADA) analysis
- Programming
- Spatial planning
- Workstation standards
- Furniture evaluation
- Architectural design
- Interior design
- Facility management
- Construction documentation
- Construction administration
- Change management
- Move management
- Graphics and signage
- 3D illustration and animation
- Specification and administration
