= Maryland Reapers =

2012 American Indoor Football team

Logo

General information
- Folded: 2012
- Headquartered: Laurel, Maryland at The Gardens Ice House
- Colors: Black, Gray, White
- Mascot: Morty

Personnel
- Owners: Charles Thompson and Nichele Rhone
- Head coach: Matthew Steeple

Team history
- Maryland Reapers (2012)

Home fields
- The Gardens Ice House (2012)

League / conference affiliations
- American Indoor Football (2012)

The Maryland Reapers were an American Indoor Football team that played in 2012. Based in Laurel, Maryland, the Reapers played their home games at The Gardens Ice House.

== Season-by-season ==
Season records
Season	W	L	T	Finish	Playoff results
2012	1	5	0	--	

== 2012 season ==
Date	Opponent	Home/Away	Result
March 17	Carolina Force	Away	Lost 48–70
March 24	Cape Fear Heroes	Away	Lost 20–92
April 7	Harrisburg Stampede	Away	Lost 28–59
April 14	Tri-State Redhawks	Home	Lost 36–49
April 21	Tri-State Redhawks	Home	Won 53–36
April 28	Macon Steel	Home	Lost 35–41
May 27	Tri-State Redhawks	Home	canceled
