= The Gardens Ice House =

Skating and fitness facility in Laurel, Maryland, U.S.

- Interactive map of The Gardens Ice House
- Location: 13800 Old Gunpowder Rd; Laurel, MD 20707
- Coordinates: 39°4′43″N 76°55′18″W
- Owner: Claiborn (Clai) Carr and Tom Hendrix
- Operator: Clai Carr
- Surface: Multi-surface

Construction
- Opened: September 13, 1996
- Architects: Waterer and Thorp
- General contractor: Waverly Construction

Tenants
- Washington Power (MLRH) (1998); Washington Jr. Nationals (AJHL) (2010–2014); Maryland Reapers (AIF) (2012)

Website
- www.thegardensicehouse.com

The Gardens Ice House is a privately operated skating and fitness facility in Laurel, Maryland. Built on Fairland Regional Park land, the venue features an Olympic ice rink, two NHL rinks (the third of these added on January 1, 1999), and since November 2013, an outdoor mini-rink.

The Gardens is a public-private partnership between the Maryland-National Capital Park and Planning Commission and Top Shelf Development. The facility hosts the Mid Atlantic Skating School, Gardens Figure Skating Club, and Potomac Curling Club, as well as the annual Maryland Scholastic High School Championship. The Tri-City Eagles youth hockey teams also play at The Gardens. It hosted the American Indoor Football league's Maryland Reapers in 2012. The facility hosted the Washington Jr. Nationals from 2010 until their move to Vermont in 2014.

"Whitey's Pond", an outdoor skating venue open from November to March each year, had its grand opening at The Gardens on November 1, 2013. Named in honor of veteran hockey rink owner Whitey Guenin of Indiana, the rink will feature 3 on 3 adult hockey, described at other rinks as a form of pond hockey.

As of early May 2020, The Gardens was being used as a temporary morgue while otherwise closed during the COVID-19 pandemic in the United States, with the bodies elevated from the ice, draped with Maryland flags, and guarded by Maryland Park Police officers while awaiting transportation elsewhere.
