= Macon Steel =

Indoor football team in Georgia

Logo

General information
- Founded: 2012
- Folded: 2012
- Headquartered: Macon Coliseum in Macon, Georgia
- Colors: Blue, red, silver, white, black

Personnel
- Owner: American Indoor Football
- Head coach: Ervin Bryson
- President: Max Jean-Gilles

Team history
- Macon Steel (2012)

Home fields
- Macon Coliseum (2012)

League / conference affiliations
- American Indoor Football (2012)

The Macon Steel was a professional indoor football team based in Macon, Georgia. The team played most of the 2012 season as a member of American Indoor Football. The Steel played its home games at the Macon Coliseum.

The Macon Steel folded on May 6, 2012, due to financial difficulties. At the time, then-Steel head coach Ervin Bryson announced he was going to form a new American Indoor Football team for Macon called the Macon Irons to start play in 2013, but the team never came to fruition.

The Steel was the second arena/indoor football team to be based in Macon, following the af2's Macon Knights, which played from 2001 until 2006. Macon would not get another indoor football team until the Georgia Doom began play in 2018.

== Season-by-season ==
Season records
Season	W	L	T	Finish	Playoff results
2012	1	5	0	T-5th	DNQ

=== Regular season ===
Game	Opponent	Results	
Game	Opponent	Final score	Team record
1	Carolina Force	L 38–45	0–1
2	at Cape Fear Heroes	L 29–53	0–2
3	Cape Fear Heroes	L 40–88	0–3
4	at Maryland Reapers	W 41–35	1–3
5	at Cape Fear Heroes	L 26–90	1–4
6	Carolina Force (Note: This game was played by a replacement team called the Chattanooga Generals)	L 0–6	1–5
