= Aaron Crawford (American football) =

American football player (born 1997)

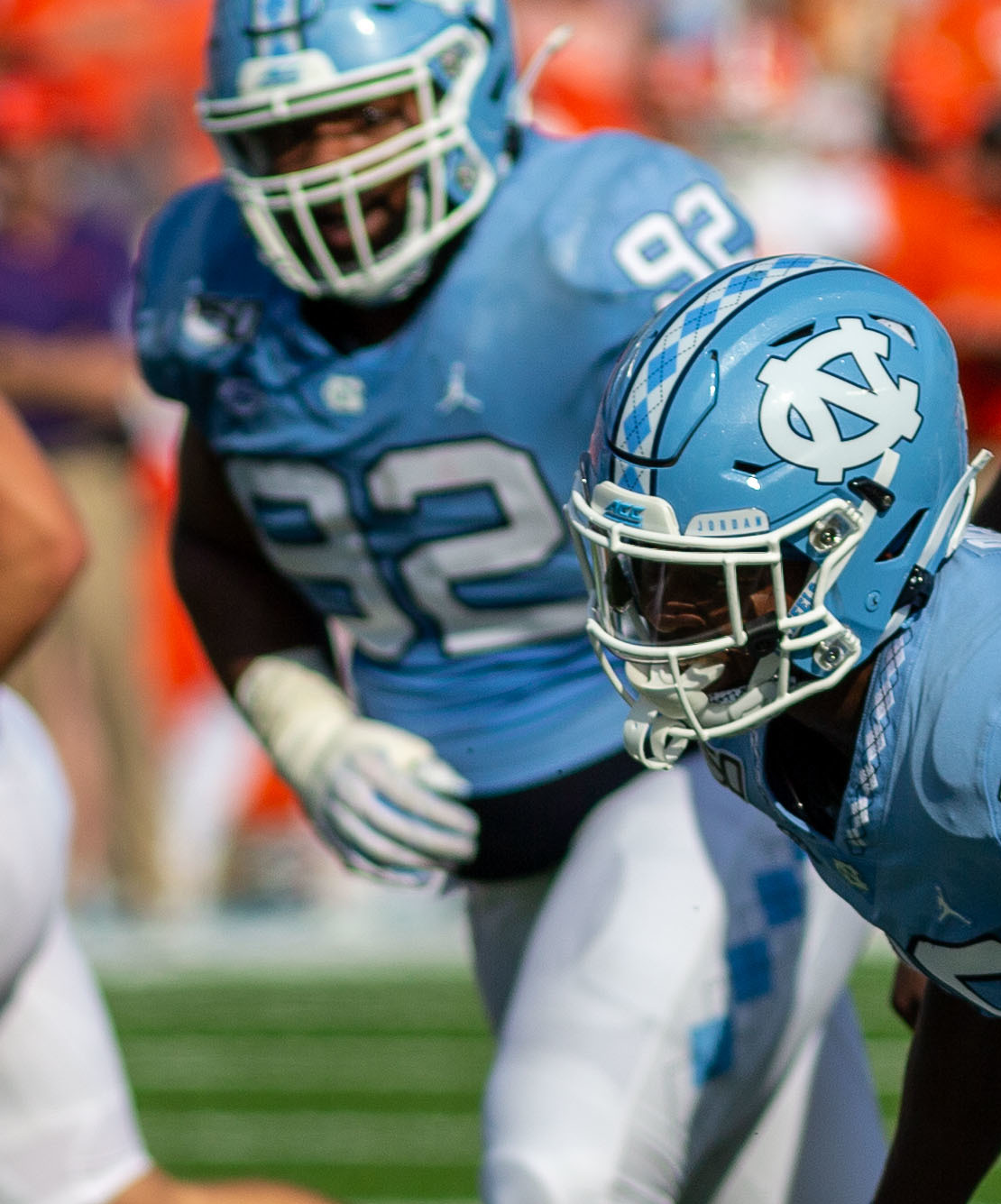
- Crawford (92) with North Carolina

Profile
- Position: Nose tackle

Personal information
- Born: November 4, 1997 (age 29); Washington, D.C., U.S.
- Listed height: 6 ft 1 in (1.85 m)
- Listed weight: 315 lb (143 kg)

Career information
- High school: Stone Bridge (Ashburn, Virginia)
- College: North Carolina
- NFL draft: 2020: undrafted

Career history
- Baltimore Ravens (2020–2021); New York Giants (2022)*; Los Angeles Chargers (2022)*
- * Offseason or practice squad member only

Career NFL statistics
- Total tackles: 1
- Stats at Pro Football Reference

Aaron Crawford (born November 4, 1997) is an American professional football nose tackle. He played college football at North Carolina.

== Early life ==
Crawford attended Stone Bridge High School in Ashburn, Virginia. As a sophomore, he helped his team reach the 2012 Virginia AAA Division 5 title game. Considered a three-star prospect by 247 Sports, Crawford committed to North Carolina over offers from Virginia and Boston College.

== College career ==
Crawford was sidelined with a knee injury after two games as a true freshman, forcing him to redshirt. He made 10 starts for North Carolina as a redshirt freshman. As a sophomore, he started all 12 games and had 29 tackles including 5.0 tackles for loss, 3.0 sacks and a fumble recovery. Crawford tore his PCL and sprained his MCL during preseason camp as a junior. He managed to return on October 13, 2018, but was limited and wore a knee brace, and played his second and final game of the season on October 27. Crawford made one tackle in the two games and called it the toughest part of his career. Coach Larry Fedora was fired after the season. As a senior in 2019, Crawford started all 13 games and recorded 50 tackles, three sacks, and finished tied for second on the team with 9.0 tackles for loss.

== Professional career ==
=== Baltimore Ravens ===
After not being selected in the 2020 NFL draft, Crawford signed with the Baltimore Ravens as an undrafted free agent on April 25, 2020. He was waived during final roster cuts on September 5, 2020, and signed to their practice squad the next day. He was elevated to the active roster on December 2 for the team's week 12 game against the Pittsburgh Steelers, and reverted to the practice squad after the game. On January 18, 2021, Crawford signed a reserve/futures contract with the Ravens.

On August 31, 2021, Crawford was waived/injured by the Ravens and placed on injured reserve. On March 9, 2022, Crawford re-signed with the Ravens.

On August 30, 2022, Crawford was waived/injured by the Ravens and placed on injured reserve. He was released on September 1.

=== New York Giants ===
On November 8, 2022, the New York Giants signed Crawford to their practice squad, but was released the next day.

=== Los Angeles Chargers ===
On December 21, 2022, Crawford was signed to the Los Angeles Chargers practice squad.
