= Zach Thompson (American football) =

American football player (born 1991)

Profile
- Position: Outside linebacker

Personal information
- Born: January 18, 1991 (age 35); Ashburn, Virginia
- Listed height: 6 ft 5 in (1.96 m)
- Listed weight: 265 lb (120 kg)

Career information
- High school: Ashburn (VA) Stone Bridge
- College: Wake Forest
- NFL draft: 2014: undrafted

Career history
- New York Jets (2014)*; Denver Broncos (2014)*; Baltimore Ravens (2014–2015)
- * Offseason or practice squad member only
- Stats at Pro Football Reference

Zachary Kenneth Thompson (born January 18, 1991) is an American professional football outside linebacker. He played college football for the Wake Forest Demon Deacons. He was signed by the New York Jets as an undrafted free agent in 2014.

== Early life ==
Thompson attended Stone Bridge High School in Ashburn, Virginia. In high school, he played for his father, Mickey Thompson, who played at the University of Virginia. In 2008, he was selected to the All-Met first-team and was selected to the Class 5A all-state first-team as a defensive lineman. He was selected to the All-Liberty District first-team in both positions as a tight end and defensive end. He was selected to the Washington Post Loudoun All-Extra team in back to back seasons in 2007 and 2008.

== College career ==
In his junior season, he was named as the ACC Defensive Lineman of the Week after recording 12 tackles against Army on September 24, 2012. He finished college with a total of 153 Tackles, 10 Sacks, 2 Interceptions and 2 Forced fumbles.

== Professional career ==
=== New York Jets ===
Thompson was signed by the New York Jets as an undrafted free agent on May 11, 2014. He was released on August 30, 2014.

=== Denver Broncos ===
Thompson was added to the Denver Broncos' practice squad on September 1, 2014.

=== Baltimore Ravens ===
On December 16, 2014, the Baltimore Ravens signed Thompson to their practice squad. On December 23, 2014, the Baltimore Ravens cut Thompson from their practice squad. On January 12, 2015, Thompson signed a reserve/future contract with the Baltimore Ravens. On September 5, 2015, the Baltimore Ravens placed Thompson on Injured Reserve. On December 7, 2015, the Baltimore Ravens waived Thompson.
