= Boulevard Brewing Company =

Brewery in Kansas City, Missouri

- Interactive map of Boulevard Brewing Company
- Location: Kansas City, Missouri
- Coordinates: 39°04′56″N 94°35′48″W
- Opened: 1989; 37 years ago
- Annual production volume: 219,094 US beer barrels (257,102 hL) in 2016
- Revenue: ▲US$32.0M (FY 2011)
- Owner: Duvel Moortgat Brewery
- Employees: 125

Active beers
Name	Type
KC Pils	Pilsner
Pale Ale	Pale ale
Unfiltered Wheat Beer	American wheat beer
Boulevard Light Beer	Light Beer
Single-Wide I.P.A.	India Pale Ale
Space Camper Cosmic IPA	IPA

Seasonal beers
Name	Type
Irish Ale	Irish Ale
Zōn	Belgian Witbier
Bob's '47	Märzen
Nutcracker Ale	Winter Warmer

Other beers
Smokestack Series
Name	Type
Tank 7	Saison
The Sixth Glass	Quadrupel
The Calling I.P.A.	Double India Pale Ale
Dark Truth Stout	Stout
Saison-Brett	Saison
Bourbon Barrel Quad	Quadrupel
Whiskey Barrel Stout	American Double/Imperial Stout
Rye-on-Rye	Rye Ale
Crown Town Ale	Pale Ale

Boulevard Brewing Company is a brewery located in Kansas City, Missouri. The Brewers Association currently ranks the American arm of Boulevard's parent company, Duvel Moortgat USA, as the 4th largest craft brewery, and the 13th largest active brewery in the United States based on 2023 sales volume. Boulevard is the largest craft brewery in the state of Missouri. Boulevard's beers are available in select markets across the United States and Canada.

In 2013, Boulevard was acquired by Duvel Moortgat Brewery. Terms of the deal were not disclosed, but industry publication Beer Business Daily estimated the sale price exceeded $100 million.

== History ==
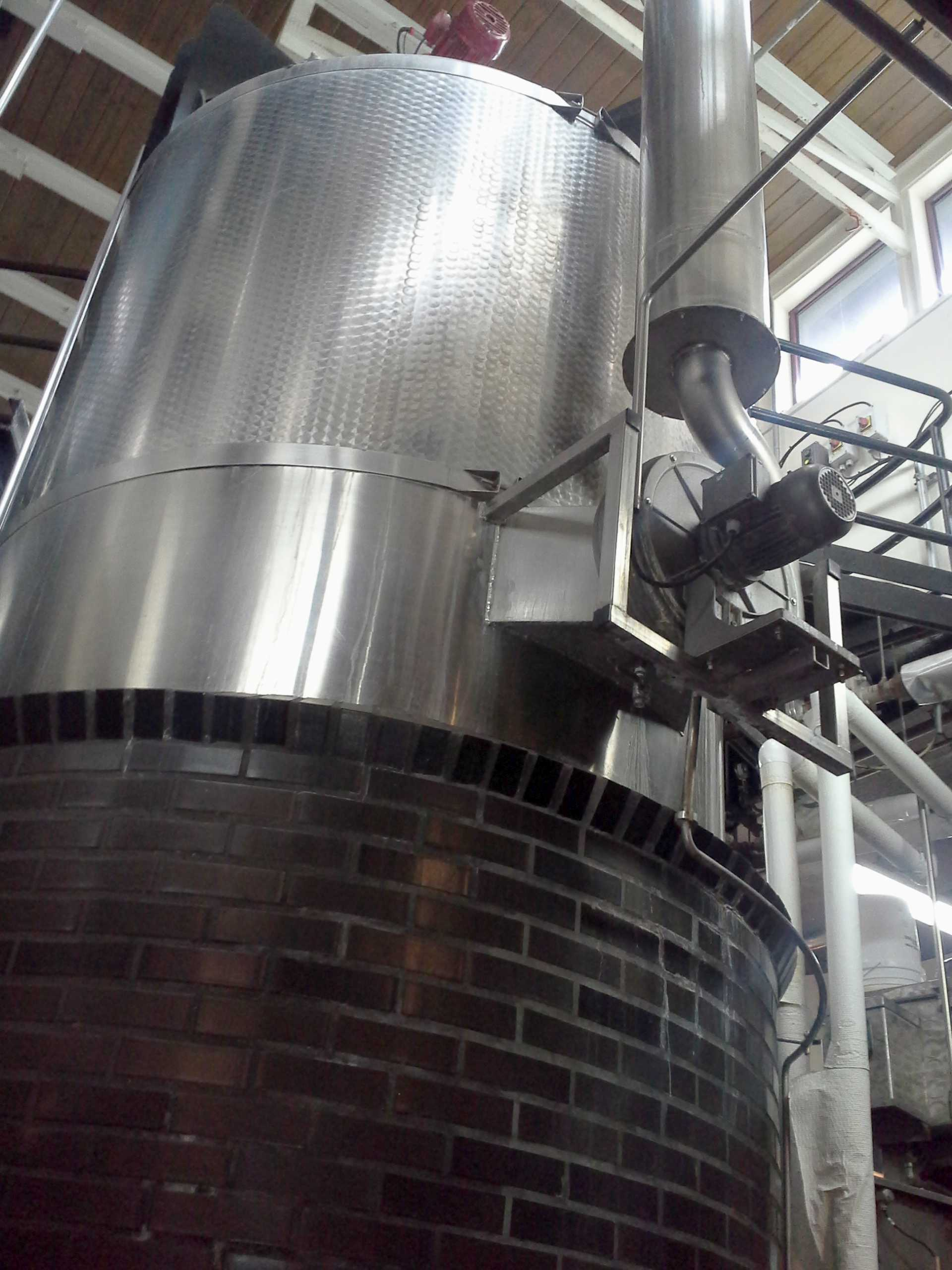
Boulevard Brewing Company started with this 35 barrel hopper.

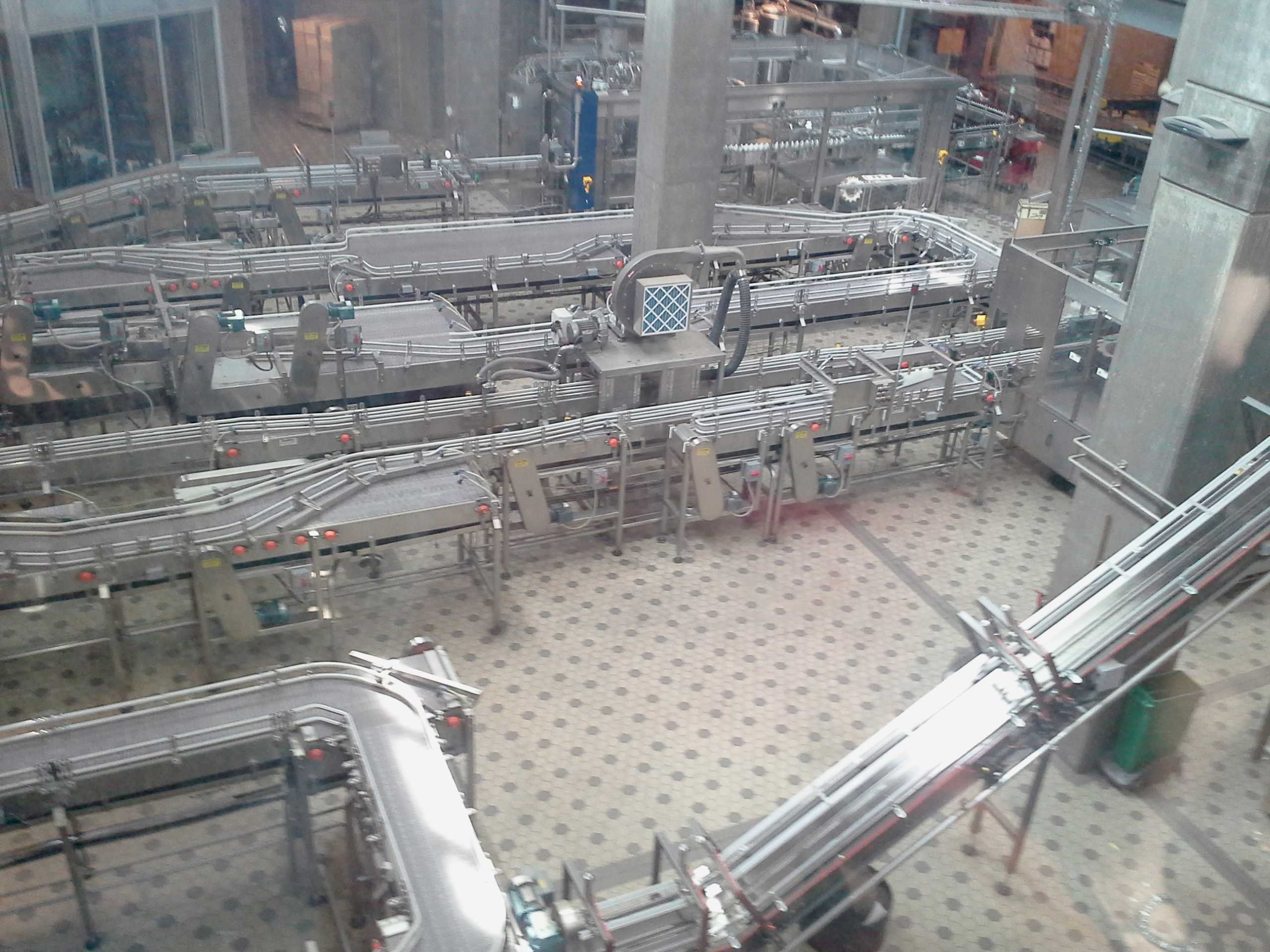
Boulevard Brewery's bottling line is turned off in this photo.

Boulevard began in 1988 with the construction of the brewery in a turn-of-the-century brick building on Kansas City’s historic Southwest Boulevard. A vintage Bavarian brewhouse was installed with used equipment from a closed brewery in Bavaria, Germany, and the first batches of beer were produced in the fall of 1989. Based on the historic example set by the local and regional breweries that were once common throughout the United States prior to Prohibition, the brewery has a focus on providing locally-brewed beer for the Kansas City region. The brewery's first half-barrel of Boulevard Pale Ale was delivered in a pickup truck to Ponak's Mexican Kitchen, located nearby. In 1990, Boulevard Wheat was added to the product line. Wheat and Pale Ale remain the company’s strongest sellers.

Introduced in late 2007, the "Smokestack Series" joined Boulevard's family of beers with year-round, seasonal, and limited edition lines of artisanal selections packaged mostly in 750 ml bottles, while some are also available in 12 oz. bottles and on draft. These bold, complex varieties were inspired by Belgian Trappist beer, and share several characteristics including their higher alcohol content. Year-round Smokestack beers include The Calling double ipa, Long Strange Tripel, The Sixth Glass quadrupel, Dark Truth Stout, Tell-Tale Tart a slightly sour ale, and Tank 7, a farmhouse ale. Additional Smokestack beers have been released, including some limited release and some that are available year-round.

In mid-2009, the company introduced Boulevard Pilsner to its core brand family. The brew is a nod to the full-bodied pilsners of Kansas City's historic breweries of the late nineteenth and early twentieth centuries. In the spring of 2013, Boulevard Pilsner was rebranded to KC Pils.

In 2018, Boulevard teamed with Kansas City native and rapper Tech N9ne to create a new beer. The beer, which is named Bou Lou and is a wheat beer with pineapple and coconut flavors, is named for and inspired by his song "Caribou Lou". It was released on June 18 in Kansas City, Wichita, Denver, and Oklahoma City and on July 9 in St. Louis.

With capacity reaching an estimated 600,000 barrels from an expansion project completed in 2006, the brewery is now one of the largest craft brewers in the Midwest. In the US, Boulevard beer is available in 41 states. Internationally, it can be found in Belgium, Brazil, Canada, China, Finland, France, Germany, the Netherlands, Norway, Sweden and the United Kingdom.

In 2013, many of the brewery's beers were certified kosher by the Vaad HaKashruth of Kansas City.

In 2020 the Boulevard introduced the "Quirk" line of hard seltzers.

=== 2021 sexism and harassment scandal ===
In January 2021, a female reddit user reported leaving the brewery in 2020 because of harassment and a "sexist work environment", detailing numerous examples of prejudice against women. The post was shared widely, gained media attention, and less than one week later Boulevard's president Jeff Krum resigned, along with two other high-level employees. The brewery's founder, John McDonald, returned to run the company to "make things right" shortly after. An outside company was hired to conduct an investigation, which "affirmed [that] instances of harassment and problematic behavior had occurred."

== Brewery expansion ==
Boulevard underwent expansions in 1999 and 2005. In March 2006, Boulevard broke ground on a $20 million expansion project that increased brewing production capacity by an estimated 60,000 barrels/year. The new brewing and packaging building was constructed adjacent to the existing plant.

Designed by 360 Architecture, the new addition is 68,500 square feet (6,360 m^{2}) and includes a two-story state-of-the-art brewhouse and a kegging/bottling facility with a skylit atrium. The third floor, in addition to housing Boulevard Brewery offices, has two large hospitality rooms, with a terrace overlooking downtown Kansas City. A glass skywalk links both pedestrian circulation and beer piping between the old and new brewhouses.

The completed expansion facilitates the brewing of Boulevard's Unfiltered Wheat Beer and Pale Ale beers, which together comprise more than 60 percent of Boulevard's sales. Unfiltered Wheat Beer is the best-selling beer of its style in the Midwest.

In Fall 2011 Boulevard began a $3 million expansion of its original brew house at 25th Street and Southwest Boulevard in Kansas City. The expansion required Boulevard to remove six 105-barrel fermenters in order to replace them with eight new 300-barrel fermentation tanks. The expansion allowed the brewery to produce an additional 35,000 barrels of beer a year, increasing capacity by about 20 percent. In order to accommodate the new tanks, the original brew house at 25th Street and Southwest Boulevard needed to be raised about 35 feet.

Boulevard offers daily tours where visitors may sample their brews.
