= Adventist Health Arena =

Indoor arena in Stockton, California, U.S.

Coordinates: 37.956077°N 121.296116°W

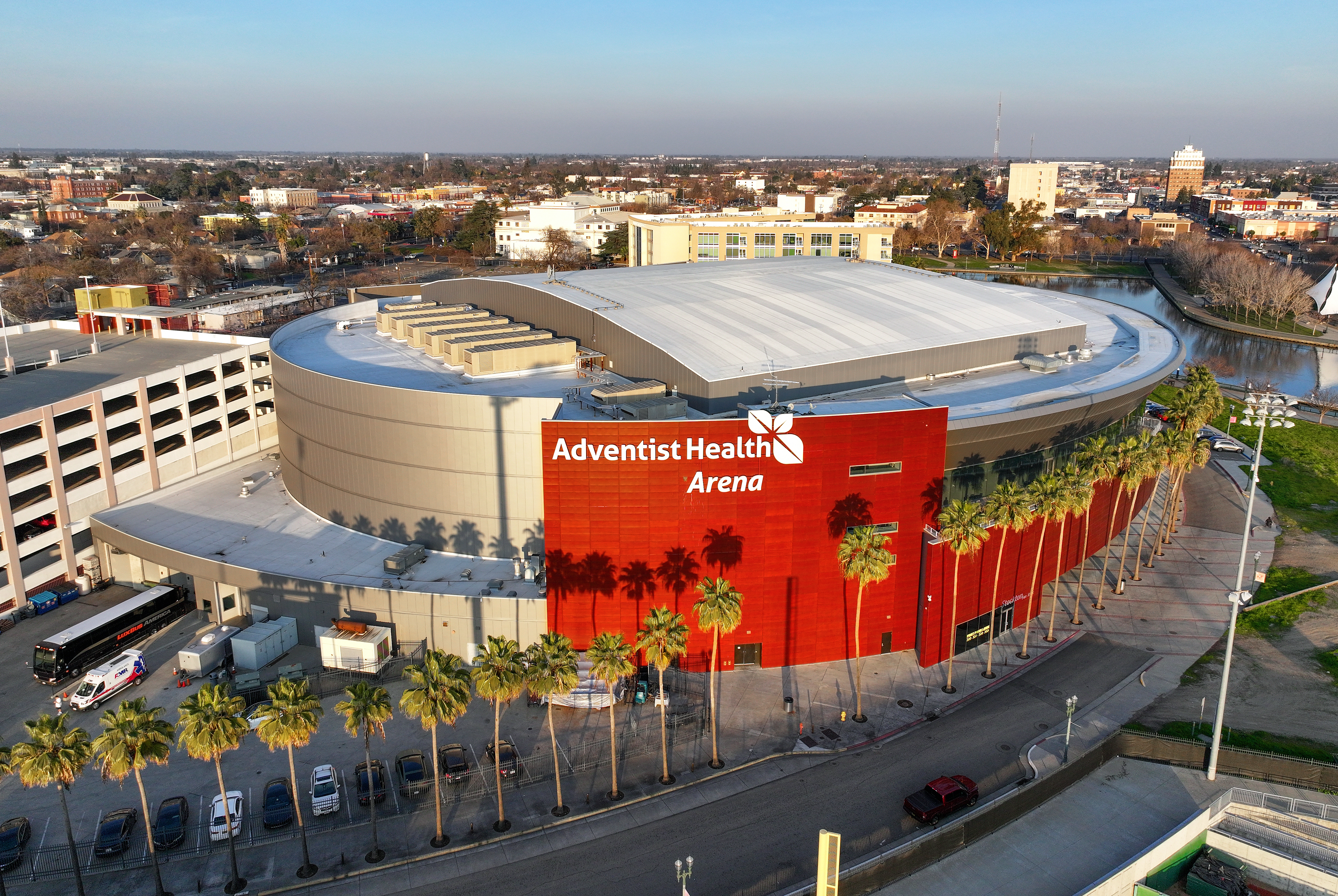

- Location within California Location within the United States
- Former names: Stockton Arena (2005–2023)
- Address: 248 West Fremont Street
- Location: Stockton, California, U.S.
- Owner: City of Stockton
- Operator: ASM Global
- Capacity: Concert (center stage): 11,800; Concert (end stage): 10,414 Basketball: 11,193; Ice Hockey/Indoor soccer: 9,737; Arena football: 9,763
- Surface: Multi-surface

Construction
- Groundbreaking: April 17, 2004
- Opened: December 2, 2005
- Cost: $68 million ($112 million in 2025 dollars)
- Architect: 360 Architecture
- Structural engineer: Magnusson Klemencic Associates
- Services engineer: Flack + Kurtz Inc.
- General contractor: Swinerton Builders

Tenants
- California Cougars (MISL/PASL-Pro) (2005–2011); Stockton Thunder (ECHL) (2005–2015); Stockton Lightning (AF2) (2006–2009); Stockton Wolves (2011); California Eagles (AIF) (2012); Stockton Heat (AHL) (2015–2022); Stockton Kings (NBAGL) (2018–present); Stockton Thunder (FPHL) (2026–present)

Website
- stocktonlive.com

Adventist Health Arena is an indoor arena in Stockton, California. It opened in December 2005 and seats a maximum of 12,000 fans.

It is the home venue of the Stockton Kings of the NBA G League and the Stockton Thunder of the Federal Prospects Hockey League. Former tenants include the Stockton Heat of the American Hockey League, the Stockton Lightning arenafootball2 team, the Stockton Cougars Professional Arena Soccer League team, the Stockton Wolves independent indoor football team, the California Eagles American Indoor Football professional indoor football team and the Stockton Thunder of the ECHL from 2005 until 2015.

Adventist Health Arena is part of a downtown, waterfront entertainment center which includes Banner Island Ballpark, the home of the Stockton Ports minor league baseball team and the University Plaza Waterfront Hotel, all part of the Stockton Waterfront Events Center.

== History ==
The arena is part of a master-planned waterfront design on the western edge of the downtown Central Business District. The 360 Architecture designed venue is situated next to the Stockton Ballpark. A multi-purpose sporting and event center, the arena was envisioned as part of the region's quality of life improvements. Construction delays and inclement weather caused the Stockton Thunder and California Cougars to play on extended road trips during the beginning of their 2005/2006 season. Stockton Arena opened its doors to the public on December 2, 2005, with a Neil Diamond concert. The first sporting event was a Stockton Thunder hockey game on December 10, 2005, in front of a sold-out crowd of 10,117, a game where the Thunder beat the Phoenix RoadRunners, 4–0.

On October 24, 2023, Adventist Health and ASM Global announced plans for a new partnership that will rename the city of Stockton's 10,000-seat facility to Adventist Health Arena.

== Events ==
Adventist Health Arena hosted the 2008 ECHL All-Star Game, WWE house shows for both SmackDown/ECW and Raw, and the July 26, 2008 EliteXC: Unfinished Business MMA event.

On March 15, 2009, the California Cougars won their first ever league championship in the Stockton Arena, as the 2008–2009 PASL-Pro North American Champions.

On December 9, 2009, the arena hosted the "Stockton Showcase" which featured a matchup between the nationally ranked California Golden Bears and the Pacific Tigers men's basketball teams in front of 8,704 fans, the largest crowd ever to see a Pacific Tigers basketball game in Stockton.

On June 19, 2014, the San Jose Sharks announced that the arena would host a split-squad exhibition game featuring the Sharks and the Vancouver Canucks on September 23. The Sharks won 5–3.

On August 29, 2015, the arena hosted ArenaBowl XXVIII, which featured the Jacksonville Sharks and the San Jose SaberCats, with the SaberCats winning in what would be their final game.
