= Arizona Outlaws (AIF) =

Defunct indoor football team

Logo

General information
- Founded: 2012
- Folded: 2012
- Headquartered: Tim's Toyota Center in Prescott Valley, Arizona
- Colors: Black and Gold

Personnel
- Owners: CNT Football, LLC (Carie Schultz, Terry Foster, Tony Stewart, TBA)
- Head coach: Terry Foster

Team history
- Arizona Outlaws (2012)

Home fields
- Tim's Toyota Center (2012)

League / conference affiliations
- American Indoor Football (2012)

Championships
- League championships: 0; 0
- Conference championships: 0; 0
- Division championships: 0; 0

The Arizona Outlaws were a team of American Indoor Football that played during 2012 only. Based in Prescott Valley, Arizona, the Outlaws played their home games at Tim's Toyota Center.

The Outlaws were the second indoor football team to play in Prescott Valley, following the Arizona Adrenaline which played in the American Indoor Football Association for 2008 before taking two seasons off, after which they reactivated as a member of the Indoor Football League for the 2011 season before folding for good after said season. The team's name was picked from a suggestion box and shares its name with the Arizona Outlaws of the United States Football League.

== Season-by-season ==
Season records
Season	W	L	T	Finish	Playoff results
2012	1	4	—	3rd of 4, Western; 8th of 11, AIF	Did not qualify
