= Washington Power (inline hockey) =

Hockey team in Maryland, United States

- City: Laurel, Maryland, United States
- Conference: World
- Division: Coastal
- Founded: 1998
- Home arena: The Gardens Ice House
- Colors: Navy, Silver, Red, White
- Affiliates: None

Franchise history
- 1998: Washington Power (MLRH)

The Washington Power was a professional inline hockey team based in Laurel, Maryland. The Power played in 1998 at The Gardens Ice House, in the MLRH World Conference Coastal Division.

As part of a rebirth of Major League Roller Hockey, the team returned in 2014 as the short-lived DC Filibusters in the Super League's East Division.
