= Adam Comrie =

Canadian ice hockey player (1990–2020)

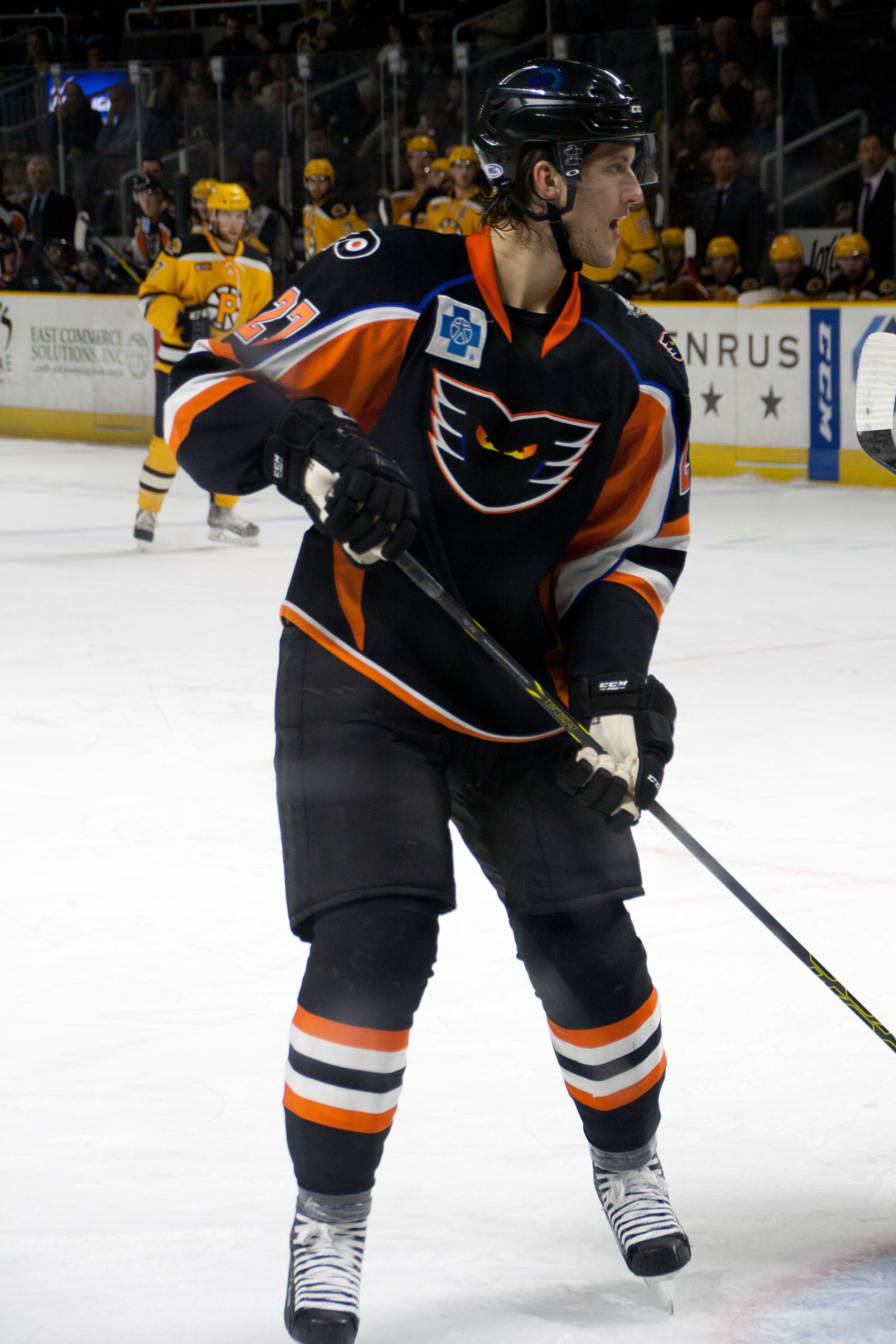
- Comrie with the Lehigh Valley Phantoms in 2015
- Born: July 31, 1990 Kanata, Ontario, Canada
- Died: August 8, 2020 (aged 30) Leesburg, Virginia, U.S.
- Height: 6 ft 4 in (193 cm)
- Weight: 205 lb (93 kg; 14 st 9 lb)
- Position: Defence
- Shot: Left
- Played for: Rochester Americans; Worcester Sharks; Lehigh Valley Phantoms; Syracuse Crunch; Utica Comets; EC KAC
- NHL draft: 80th overall, 2008; Florida Panthers
- Playing career: 2010–2020

Adam Comrie (July 31, 1990 – August 8, 2020) was a Canadian-American professional ice hockey defenceman. Comrie was selected by the Florida Panthers in the 3rd round (80th overall) of the 2008 NHL entry draft.

== Playing career ==
As a youth Comrie attended and played junior hockey for Stone Bridge High School in Ashburn, Virginia.

Comrie played major junior hockey in the Ontario Hockey League (OHL) with the Saginaw Spirit and the Guelph Storm.

On April 13, 2010, the Florida Panthers signed Comrie to a three-year entry-level contract. Comrie made his professional debut in the American Hockey League with the Rochester Americans during the 2010–11 season.

On July 10, 2013, Comrie was signed to a one-year, two-way contract with the San Jose Sharks. He never appeared with the Sharks in the 2013–14 season, posting 19 points in 56 games with the San Jose affiliate Worcester Sharks.

On October 6, 2014, as an un-signed free agent over the summer, Comrie signed to return to the ECHL with the Reading Royals on a one-year deal. He split the season between the Royals and affiliate club, the Lehigh Valley Phantoms of the AHL, producing 18 points in 40 games from the blueline.

On October 10, 2015, Comrie secured a one-year AHL contract with the Phantoms and was reassigned to Royals to begin the 2015–16 season. He was again shuffled between the ECHL and AHL, posting a respectable 15 points in 32 games with Lehigh Valley.

As a free agent on July 26, 2016, Comrie agreed to a one-year deal with the Syracuse Crunch. Comrie remained with the Crunch for the majority of the 2016–17 season, spending a brief stint in the ECHL with the Kalamazoo Wings. In adding a veteran presence, he matched a career best with 19 points in 55 games with the Crunch. With his help on defense, the Crunch would win their division and reach the Calder Cup Finals, but Comrie did not play in any of their playoff games.

Comrie left Syracuse as a free agent and returned to the Reading Royals for the 2017–18 season. On November 4, 2017, he returned on loan to the Lehigh Valley Phantoms and appeared in two games before he was released back to the ECHL.

After 8 professional seasons in North America, Comrie opted to embark on a European career, agreeing to a one-year deal with Austrian club, EC KAC of the EBEL, on July 16, 2018.

== Death ==
Comrie was killed in a motorcycle collision on August 8, 2020, at the age of 30. The collision occurred while Comrie was visiting his mother in the U.S. state of Virginia.

== Career statistics ==
			Regular season					Playoffs
Season	Team	League	GP	G	A	Pts	PIM	GP	G	A	Pts	PIM
2006–07	Ohio Junior Blue Jackets	USHL	19	6	4	10	28	—	—	—	—	—
2006–07	Omaha Lancers	USHL	38	1	6	7	27	5	0	0	0	4
2007–08	Saginaw Spirit	OHL	58	10	18	28	90	4	0	0	0	4
2008–09	Saginaw Spirit	OHL	52	9	21	30	70	8	0	2	2	8
2009–10	Guelph Storm	OHL	68	14	26	40	79	5	1	2	3	4
2010–11	Rochester Americans	AHL	44	0	5	5	18	—	—	—	—	—
2010–11	Cincinnati Cyclones	ECHL	13	4	4	8	18	—	—	—	—	—
2011–12	Cincinnati Cyclones	ECHL	4	3	3	6	2	—	—	—	—	—
2011–12	Greenville Road Warriors	ECHL	3	1	0	1	2	1	0	0	0	2
2012–13	Reading Royals	ECHL	45	17	16	33	106	—	—	—	—	—
2012–13	Worcester Sharks	AHL	24	3	12	15	24	—	—	—	—	—
2013–14	Worcester Sharks	AHL	56	3	16	19	38	—	—	—	—	—
2014–15	Lehigh Valley Phantoms	AHL	40	5	13	18	50	—	—	—	—	—
2014–15	Reading Royals	ECHL	21	7	7	14	28	7	2	2	4	10
2015–16	Lehigh Valley Phantoms	AHL	32	9	6	15	11	—	—	—	—	—
2015–16	Reading Royals	ECHL	39	15	19	34	57	10	1	4	5	14
2016–17	Kalamazoo Wings	ECHL	4	0	1	1	11	—	—	—	—	—
2016–17	Syracuse Crunch	AHL	55	8	11	19	33	—	—	—	—	—
2017–18	Reading Royals	ECHL	14	1	3	4	59	—	—	—	—	—
2017–18	Lehigh Valley Phantoms	AHL	10	1	2	3	12	—	—	—	—	—
2017–18	Utica Comets	AHL	41	7	10	17	24	—	—	—	—	—
2018–19	EC KAC	EBEL	45	15	18	33	96	15	6	3	9	33
2019–20	EC KAC	EBEL	44	5	10	15	79	3	0	1	1	2
AHL totals			302	36	75	111	210	—	—	—	—	—

== Awards and honours ==
Award	Year
ECHL
Second All-Star Team	2013, 2016

== See also ==
- List of ice hockey players who died during their careers
