= Cabarrus Arena =

Arena in North Carolina, United States

Coordinates: 35°23′20″N 80°29′58″W

Cabarrus Arena & Events Center
- Interactive map of Cabarrus Arena & Events Center
- Former names: Cabarrus Arena at the Expo Park
- Location: 4751 North Carolina Highway 49; Concord, North Carolina
- Owner: Cabarrus County
- Capacity: 5,500 (Arena)
- Surface: Varies

Construction
- Groundbreaking: 2002
- Opened: October 2002

Tenants
- Carolina Thunder (ABA) (2004–2005); Carolina Speed (AIFA) (2007–2008); Carolina Force (AIF) (2012)

The Cabarrus Arena & Events Center is located in Concord, North Carolina, about 24 miles northeast of Charlotte.

The complex consists of an arena, two event centers, two reception halls, and rooms designed for business meetings.

The venue hosts concerts, trade and consumer shows, local, regional, and national sporting events, and AKC-sanctioned dog shows. It is a popular site for regional and national cheer and dance competitions and serves as the venue for commencement ceremonies for all Cabarrus County Schools high schools, three Union County high schools, and the Cabarrus County branch of Rowan-Cabarrus Community College. The arena was formerly home to the Carolina Thunder of the American Basketball Association, the Carolina Speed of the American Indoor Football Association, and the Carolina Force of American Indoor Football.

The Cabarrus Arena hosted Total Nonstop Action Wrestling's biggest event, Bound for Glory, on October 4, 2015, as well as other events from Premiere Wrestling Xperience and Evolve Wrestling. The arena also hosted Ring of Honor Wrestling's events such as Best in the World '16, Honor Reigns Supreme 2018, 2019, Queen City Excellence, and the Crockett Cup (2019).
