= Marques Colston =

American football player (born 1983)

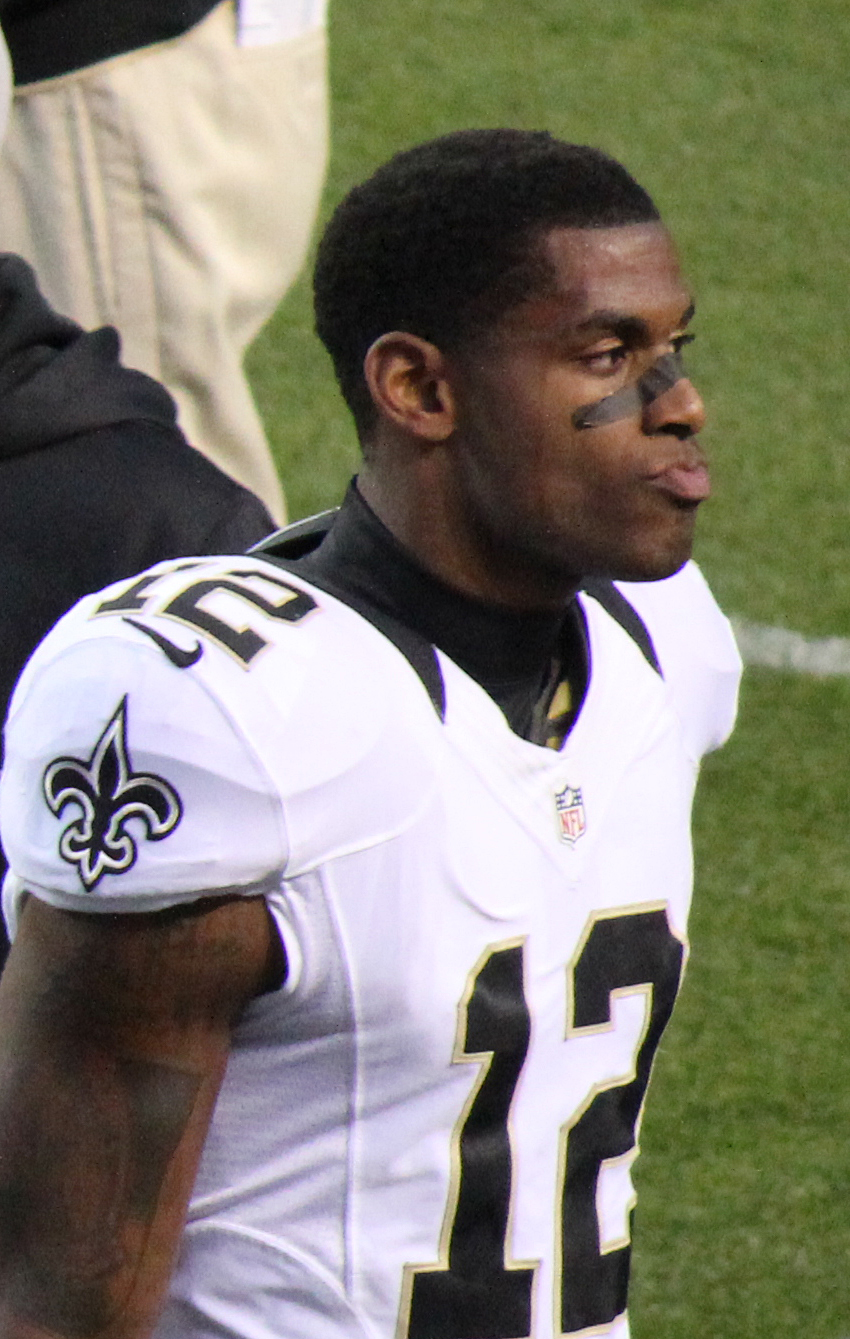
- Colston with the New Orleans Saints in 2012

No. 12
- Position: Wide receiver

Personal information
- Born: June 5, 1983 (age 43); Harrisburg, Pennsylvania, U.S.
- Listed height: 6 ft 5 in (1.96 m)
- Listed weight: 225 lb (102 kg)

Career information
- High school: Susquehanna Township (Harrisburg)
- College: Hofstra (2001–2005)
- NFL draft: 2006: 7th round, 252nd overall pick

Career history

Playing
- New Orleans Saints (2006–2015)

Operations
- Harrisburg Stampede (2012–2014) Owner & president; Philadelphia Soul (2015–2019) Minority owner; Albany Empire (2018–2019) Minority owner; Atlantic City Blackjacks (2019) Minority owner

Awards and highlights
- Super Bowl champion (XLIV); PFWA NFL All-Rookie Team (2006); New Orleans Saints Hall of Fame; First-team All-A-10 (2005); Hofstra Pride No. 89 retired

Career NFL statistics
- Receptions: 711
- Receiving yards: 9,759
- Receiving touchdowns: 72
- Stats at Pro Football Reference

Marques E. Colston (/ˈmɑːrkɪs ˈkoʊlstən/ MAR-kis KOHL-stən born June 5, 1983) is an American former professional football player who was a wide receiver in the National Football League (NFL). He played college football for the Hofstra Pride, and was selected by the New Orleans Saints in the seventh round of the 2006 NFL draft. He helped the Saints achieve victory in Super Bowl XLIV with seven receptions for 83 yards against the Indianapolis Colts. He is the Saints' all-time franchise leader in receiving yards, yards from scrimmage, receiving touchdowns, and total receptions. Despite favorable statistics compared to other Pro Bowl or All-Pro players in the same position like Brandon Marshall and Reggie Wayne, Colston was never selected for either in his career. Colston is often regarded as arguably one of the greatest players in NFL history to never have been selected to a Pro Bowl or All-Pro Team.

== Early life ==
Colston attended Susquehanna Township High School, in Harrisburg, Pennsylvania, and was a letterman in football and track. In football, he won All-Conference honors as a wide receiver and defensive end. Colston graduated from Susquehanna Township High School in June 2001.

Colston lettered three years in track & field and was a standout. He qualified for the 2001 Pennsylvania Interscholastic Athletic Association (PIAA) Outdoor T&F Championships in the javelin, recording a top-throw of 57.03 meters. He was also a member of the Susquehanna 4 × 100 m (42.41 s) relay squad.

== College career ==
Colston received a scholarship offer from the Division I-A University of Missouri but turned the offer down in favor of Division I-AA Hofstra.

Colston had 14 receptions for 335 yards (23.9 avg.) and three touchdowns as a freshman. In 2002, he made 47 grabs for 614 yards (13.06 avg.) and three scores. As a junior in 2003, Colston led the team with 51 receptions for 910 yards (17.8 average) and seven touchdowns. Colston redshirted the 2004 season due to a shoulder injury, but in 2005 was named to the All-Atlantic 10 First-team after making a career-high 70 receptions for 976 yards (13.9 avg.) and five touchdowns. In four seasons at Hofstra, Colston appeared in 40 games (37 starts) and recorded 182 catches for a school-record 2,834 yards and 18 touchdowns. During his time at Hofstra, he was teammates with future NFL cornerback Kyle Arrington.

== Professional career ==
=== Pre-draft ===
Colston declared for the 2006 NFL draft. He was tipped in many prospect profiles to become a tight end, because of his size and catching ability, but was also predicted to go undrafted.

Pre-draft measurables
Height	Weight	Arm length	Hand span	40-yard dash	10-yard split	20-yard split	20-yard shuttle	Three-cone drill	Vertical jump	Broad jump	Bench press
6 ft 4 5/8 in (1.95 m)	224 lb (102 kg)	33 3/8 in (0.85 m)	9 1/2 in (0.24 m)	4.51 s	1.59 s	2.66 s	4.43 s	6.94 s	37.0 in (0.94 m)	10 ft 3 in (3.12 m)	16 reps
All values from NFL Combine

=== 2006 season ===
The New Orleans Saints selected Colston in the seventh round with the 252nd overall pick in the 2006 NFL draft. Colston was the 32nd wide receiver drafted in 2006. He was the seventh player ever drafted out of Hofstra. With Hofstra discontinuing their football program in 2009, Colston became their last player to be drafted from the program.

On July 14, 2006, the Saints signed Colston to a three-year, $1.10 million contract that includes a signing bonus of $24,600.

Throughout training camp, Colston competed to be the third wide receiver on the depth chart against Devery Henderson, Lance Moore, and Terrance Copper. After performing well throughout training camp, head coach Sean Payton elected to trade starting wide receiver Donte Stallworth, stating Colston's progress made Stallworth expendable.

He made his professional regular season debut in the New Orleans Saints' season-opener at the Cleveland Browns and made four receptions for 49 yards and scored his first career touchdown. He made his first career touchdown reception on a 12-yard pass by quarterback Drew Brees during the third quarter. In Week 3, in a game on the road against the Carolina Panthers, Colston recorded an 86-yard receiving touchdown in the 21–18 loss. The reception was the longest receiving play for the Saints since Eddie Kennison had a 90-yard play in 1999. On October 29, Colston caught six passes for 163 receiving yards and had a season-high two touchdown receptions during a 35–22 loss against the Baltimore Ravens in Week 8. He was named the Diet Pepsi NFL Rookie of the Week for Week 8. He was named the Offensive Rookie of the Month for October. The following week, Colston made a season-high 11 receptions for 123 receiving yards and one touchdown during the Saints' 31–14 victory at the Tampa Bay Buccaneers in Week 9. Once again, he earned Diet Pepsi NFL Rookie of the Week for Week 9. In Week 10, Colston recorded 10 catches for a season-high 169 receiving yards during a 38–31 loss at the Pittsburgh Steelers. His performance marked his third consecutive game with over 100 receiving yards. Colston sprained his left ankle during a Week 11 loss to the Cincinnati Bengals and missed the next two games. Colston finished his rookie season with 70 receptions, 1,038 receiving yards, and eight touchdowns in 14 games and 12 starts.

He helped the Saints reach the playoffs with a 10–6 record. The Saints earned a first-round bye with the #2-seed. The Saints defeated the Philadelphia Eagles in the Divisional Round and made it to the NFC Championship Game with the Chicago Bears. Despite Colston scoring a touchdown, the Saints fell 39–14, ending the team's season.

Colston earned a spot on the NFL All-Rookie Team for his immediate contributions. He tied for second in voting for Offensive Rookie of the Year, behind Tennessee Titans' quarterback Vince Young, and with Jacksonville Jaguars' running back Maurice Jones-Drew. He had more votes than his fellow rookie teammate, the much more celebrated Reggie Bush, who was picked second overall by the Saints. Colston was among the NFC leaders in receptions (70), receiving yards (1,038) and receiving touchdowns (8).

=== 2007 season ===
Against the San Francisco 49ers on October 28, 2007, Colston caught a career-high three touchdown passes from Drew Brees and guided the Saints to a 31–10 victory in Week 8. He followed up his three-touchdown performance with three consecutive games going over 100 receiving yards (159, 128, 118). From Weeks 14–17, he recorded five receiving touchdowns in a four-game stretch. For the 2007 season, Colston recorded 1,202 receiving yards and set a team record for receptions with 98, besting the previous mark of 94 set by Joe Horn in 2000 and 2004. He would hold on to this record until 2011, when Jimmy Graham broke the mark. Colston tied Horn's record for touchdown receptions in a season with 11. Colston would share this mark until 2013, when it was also bested by Graham.

=== 2008 season ===
On July 23, 2008, Colston signed a three-year contract extension with the Saints through the 2011 season. In 2008, Colston suffered a broken thumb after a hit by Ronde Barber on a quick slant pass in the Saints' Week 1 victory over the Tampa Bay Buccaneers. This sidelined Colston for four weeks and Lance Moore moved up into the starting receiver position. In Week 10, he recorded a season-high 140 receiving yards on seven receptions against the Atlanta Falcons. A few weeks later, he recorded a 70-yard touchdown catch against the Green Bay Packers as the Saints won the game 51–29 in Week 12. In Week 16, against the Detroit Lions, he recorded his only multi-touchdown game of the season in the 42–7 victory. Colston finished the season with 47 receptions for 760 receiving yards and five receiving touchdowns.

=== 2009 season – Super Bowl XLIV ===
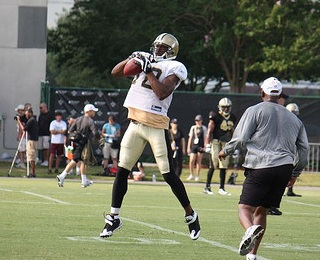
Colston during training camp in 2009

Colston found the endzone twice in Week 2 against the Philadelphia Eagles in the 48–22 victory. During a Week 6 game against the New York Giants in a battle of undefeated teams, Colston caught eight receptions for 166 yards, as the Saints defeated the Giants 48–27. Overall, Colston finished the 2009 regular season with 70 receptions for 1,074 receiving yards and nine receiving touchdowns.

The Saints finished with a 13–3 record and earned the #1-seed for the NFC playoffs. In the Divisional Round against the Arizona Cardinals, Colston had six receptions for 83 receiving yards and a touchdown in the 45–14 victory. Colston started for the Saints in Super Bowl XLIV. He contributed to the Saints' 31–17 victory with seven receptions for 83 yards against the Indianapolis Colts.

=== 2010 season ===
Colston remained a consistent producer for the Saints in the 2010 season. In Week 13, against the Cincinnati Bengals, he scored the late go-ahead touchdown with 31 seconds remaining in the 34–30 victory. He recorded three games going over 100 receiving yards and two games with multiple receiving touchdowns. Overall, Colston finished the 2010 season with 84 receptions for 1,023 receiving yards and seven receiving touchdowns in 15 games played. The Saints returned to the playoffs but failed to repeat as Super Bowl Champions, falling in the Wild Card Round to Seattle Seahawks in the Beast Quake game. In the 41–36 loss, Colston had four receptions for 66 yards. He was ranked 53rd by his fellow players on the NFL Top 100 Players of 2011.

=== 2011 season ===
Colston continued in his role as a receiving threat for Drew Brees in the 2011 season. He recorded four games going over 100 receiving yards and three games with multiple receiving touchdowns. In the regular season finale in Week 17, he recorded seven receptions for 145 receiving yards and two receiving touchdowns in the 45–17 victory over the Carolina Panthers. Overall, Colston finished the 2011 season with 80 receptions for 1,143 receiving yards and eight receiving touchdowns in 14 games as the Saints won the division with a 13–3 record. Colston set a new franchise record for most 1,000-yard seasons with his fifth, breaking a tie with Joe Horn. Colston, along with Jimmy Graham, gave the Saints their first duo with at least 1,000 receiving yards since Willie Jackson and Joe Horn in 2001.

In the Saints' two postseason games, Colston recorded seven receptions for 120 receiving yards in the 45–28 Wild Card Round victory over the Detroit Lions and nine receptions for 136 receiving yards and one touchdown in the 36–32 loss to the San Francisco 49ers in the Divisional Round.

=== 2012 season ===
On March 13, 2012, Colston signed a five-year, $40 million contract extension with the Saints. In Week 4, against the Green Bay Packers, Colston recorded nine receptions for 153 receiving yards and one receiving touchdown in a 28–27 loss . On October 7, in Week 5 against the San Diego Chargers, Colston broke Joe Horn's record for most touchdown catches by a Saints wide receiver, catching three touchdowns in the game to make 52 for his career. On November 11, in Week 10 against the Atlanta Falcons, he tied Deuce McAllister's team record for total touchdowns with his 55th career touchdown. He matched his season-high yardage total of 153 in Week 16 against the Dallas Cowboys in the 34–31 victory. Overall, he finished the 2012 season with 83 receptions for 1,154 receiving yards and ten receiving touchdowns. Colston, along with Jimmy Graham (982) and Lance Moore (1,041), gave the Saints their first trio of receivers in franchise history to record at least 900 receiving yards each.

=== 2013 season ===
In the opening game of the 2013 season, a 23–17 win over Atlanta Falcons, Colston became the Saints' all-time leader in pass receptions when he caught a second quarter touchdown pass for the 533rd catch (and 59th touchdown) of his career. In the Saints' tenth game of the season, a 23–20 home win over San Francisco 49ers, Colston passed Eric Martin to become the all-time franchise leader in receiving yards and yards from scrimmage. In Week 14, he had his most productive game of the regular season with nine receptions for 125 receiving yards and two receiving touchdowns against the Carolina Panthers. Colston finished the regular season with 75 receptions for 943 yards and five touchdowns in 15 games.

In the Saints' Divisional Round playoff game against the Seattle Seahawks, Colston led all receivers with 11 catches for 144 yards and a touchdown, the touchdown coming with 26 seconds remaining in the game to bring the Saints, who had trailed the entire game, within eight points; he then recovered the ensuing onside kick, giving the Saints a slim chance to tie the game. On the ensuing drive, Brees spiked the ball to stop the clock, then found Colston near the sideline. Instead of stepping out of bounds to stop the clock and give the Saints a chance at a last-second Hail Mary pass to the end zone, Colston went ahead with the play as it had been called, which required him to throw a lateral pass across the field to Travaris Cadet. However, Colston's throw went forward and was ruled an illegal forward pass; the 10-second runoff attached to the penalty used up the clock, sealing a 23–15 victory for the Seahawks.

=== 2014 season ===
Colston recorded two games going over the 100-yard mark in the 2014 season, first in the Saints' regular season opener against the Atlanta Falcons and later in Week 7 against the Detroit Lions. Overall, Colston recorded 59 receptions for 902 yards and five touchdowns as the Saints missed the playoffs with a 7–9 record.

=== 2015 season ===
In 2015, Colston caught 45 passes for 520 yards and four touchdowns, all career-lows. Part of his statistical decline was due to the emergence of Brandin Cooks and Willie Snead as receiving options for Brees to go along with shoulder and chest injuries causing him to miss three games. He was released by the Saints after the season. At the time of Colston's release, he and Brees were the most productive wide receiver-quarterback tandem in terms of passing yards and receiving yards over the decade-long period of 2006–2015, which encompassed Colston's career. Only Philip Rivers and Antonio Gates, a tight end, had more receiving touchdowns in that time span as a duo.

Colston was unsigned after the 2015 season. He never released a formal retirement announcement but did acknowledge his retirement in 2020. At the time of Drew Brees's retirement, Colston ended up being the player that he threw the most touchdowns to with 72.

== NFL career statistics ==
Legend
	Won the Super Bowl
**Bold**	Career high

Year	Team	Games		Receiving					Rushing					Fumbles	
Year	Team	GP	GS	Rec	Yds	Avg	Lng	TD	Att	Yds	Avg	Lng	TD	Fum	Lost
2006	NO	14	12	70	1,038	14.8	**86T**	8	—	—	—	—	—	—	—
2007	NO	16	14	**98**	**1,202**	12.3	45	**11**	—	—	—	—	—	1	1
2008	NO	11	6	47	760	**16.2**	70T	5	—	—	—	—	—	1	0
2009	NO	16	14	70	1,074	15.3	68	9	**1**	**6**	**6.0**	**6**	0	2	**2**
2010	NO	15	11	84	1,023	12.2	43	7	**1**	1	1.0	1	0	—	—
2011	NO	14	7	80	1,143	14.3	50	8	—	—	—	—	—	1	1
2012	NO	16	13	83	1,154	13.9	60	10	—	—	—	—	—	**4**	**2**
2013	NO	15	11	75	943	12.6	35	5	—	—	—	—	—	—	—
2014	NO	16	13	59	902	15.3	57	5	—	—	—	—	—	1	1
2015	NO	13	5	45	520	11.6	53T	4	—	—	—	—	—	—	—
Career		146	106	711	9,759	13.7	86	72	2	7	3.5	6	0	10	7

== Career highlights ==
=== Awards and honors ===
NFL

- Super Bowl champion (XLIV)
- PFWA NFL All-Rookie Team (2006)
- Ranked No. 53 in the Top 100 Players of 2011
- New Orleans Saints Hall of Fame

College

- First-team All-A-10 (2005)
- Hofstra Pride No. 89 retired

=== New Orleans Saints franchise records ===
- Most career receptions (711)
- Most career receiving yards (9,759)
- Highest receiving average, career (13.7)
- Most career receiving touchdowns (72)
- Most seasons with 1,000 receiving yards (6)
- Most games with 100 or more yards receiving (28)
- Most games played by a wide receiver (146)

== Personal life ==
Colston's father, James, played in the Canadian Football League. James Colston died when Marques was 14.

In 2010, Colston bought a home in Luling, Louisiana.

Colston was the majority owner of his hometown Harrisburg Stampede who played in American Indoor Football and the Professional Indoor Football League. In 2014, he bought a share of the Philadelphia Soul of the Arena Football League. Colston has pursued an executive MBA program at George Washington University, and he has made a series of investments in startup companies operating in the health and sports sectors.

In 2017, Colston was involved with the ownership group of the Albany Empire of the Arena Football League. He later became involved with the ownership of the Atlantic City Blackjacks.

Colston is involved with Son of a Saint, which is a New Orleans–based charitable organization that tries to improve the lives of fatherless boys. He is the ambassador for the program, which involves sessions that go over various life-skill topics.

On October 27, 2019, Colston was inducted into The New Orleans Saints Hall of Fame alongside Reggie Bush.

Colston delivered the keynote speech to graduates at the December 2019 commencement for the University of New Orleans. The school later hired Colston as an adjunct professor in 2020.

On September 17, 2020, Colston was named as an inductee to the Louisiana Sports Hall of Fame for the Class of 2021.
