= Stockton Lightning =

Arena football team

- Founded: 2005
- Folded: 2009
- Team history: Stockton Lightning (2006–2009)
- Based in: Stockton Arena in Stockton, California
- Home arena: Stockton Arena (2006–2009)
- League: AF2 (2006–2009): National Conference (2006); Western Division (2006); American Conference (2007); West Division (2007); National Conference (2008–2009); West Division (2008–2009)
- Colors: Black, red, silver, white

Personnel
- Head coach: Chad Carlson
- Owner: Michael Reinsdorf

Playoff appearances (1)
- 2009

The Stockton Lightning were a professional arena football team based in Stockton, California. They were members of the Western Division of the National Conference of the arenafootball2 (af2). The Lightning joined af2 2006 as an expansion team. They played their home games at Stockton Arena in Stockton, California and were coached by Chad Carlson. The Stockton Lightning were owned by Michael Reinsdorf.

== History ==
The Lightning were formed 2005 and joined af2 in 2006, led by president Dan Chapman and operator Michael Reinsdorf. The team name was announced at a November 2005 press conference at Valley Brew Restaurant, after a "Name The Team" contest and revealing of the team's black, red, gray and white colors. Richard Davis was also announced as the first head coach in franchise history.

The first-year team featured players that were local to the area, they included; James Newson, Josh Wallwork, Kenyatte Morgan, and Lyndell Hawkins. Morgan was the player who recorded the first touchdown in franchise history, a seven-yard pass from Quarterback Josh Blankenship, in a 41-40 loss to the eventual ArenaCup winners, the Spokane Shock. However, two weeks later, the Lightning recorded the first win in franchise history, when they beat the Quad City Steamwheelers 60-46.

The Lightning finished 5-11 in their first season, falling just short of playoffs. After the season, they hired new head coach Doug Murray, who was introduced to the media at a September 2006 press conference by his friend and rival head coach Fred Biletnikoff, Jr. who wore a Lightning hat.

The 2007 season started the way 2006 had, with a loss on the road in Spokane. But, things turned around mid-season as they began to win games, a total of six. However, the season ended with losses in the last four games, missing the playoffs for the second straight year.

The Lightning didn't improve in 2008 as they had hoped and finished 5-11. Once again, missing the playoffs.

In the 2009 season, the Lightning did not improve much and finished 6-10, but with this record the team finish in 3rd on NC West and made the playoffs for the first time in team history. On the playoffs, the team lost on NC Round 1 for (Spokane).

On January 22, 2010 The Stockton Lightning suspended day-to-day operations for the 2010 season.

The Lightning will continue to research playing opportunities after the folding of the arenafootball2 league (af2) at the conclusion of the 2009 playing season. The largest indoor football league in the country, the Arena Football League (AFL), ceased operations at the conclusion of the 2008 season and recently the AFL and af2 have formed a new league for the 2010 season, Arena Football One.

Dan Chapman, president of the Stockton Lightning, released the following statement:

"It is with a great deal of disappointment that the Stockton Lightning have decided to suspend operations for the upcoming 2010 football season. With the transition of the AFL and af2 developing into the new "Arena Football One" league, the proposed "lower tier" that was initially outlined did not become a reality. Furthermore, we have determined that the business model for the "upper tier", which caters to larger markets, is not financially sustainable for our organization at this time. For these reasons, we feel as though we have no other viable options to play arena football this season"

== Statistics ==
=== Season-by-season records ===
Season records
Season	W	L	T	Finish	Playoff results
2006	5	11	0	4th NC West	--
2007	6	10	0	5th AC West	--
2008	5	11	0	4th NC West	--
2009	6	10	0	3rd NC West	Lost NC Round 1 (Spokane 62-21)
Totals	22	43	0		

== Players of note ==
- Manuel Wright - DL
- Clarence Cunningham - WR, Cutter's Catch of the Week Recipient, All-Iron Man selection
- William Welcher - DE, First full time peace officer in California to simultaneously play pro football.
