= Banterra Center =

Arena in Illinois, United States

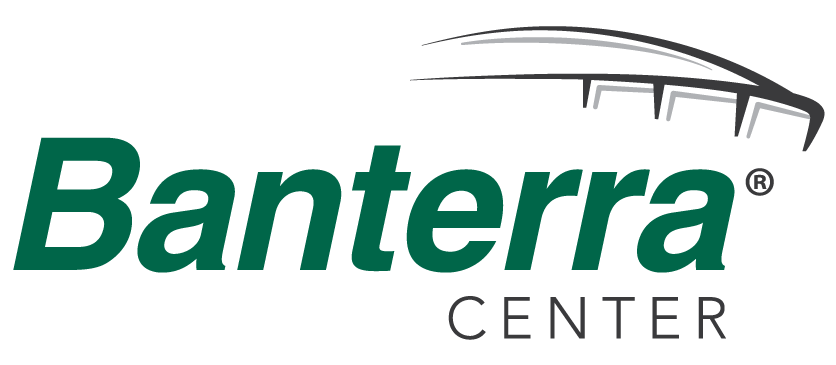

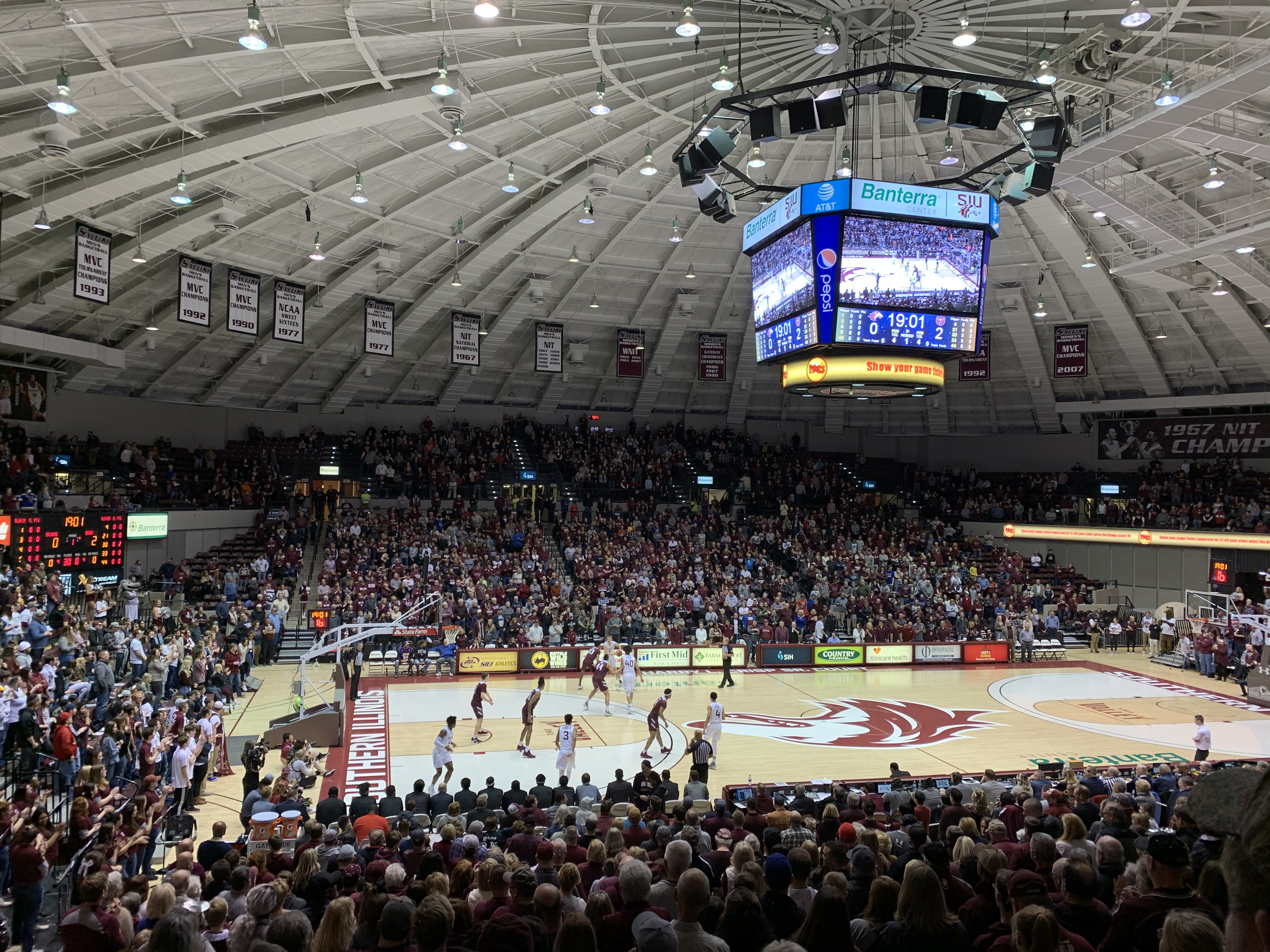
- Interactive map of Banterra Center
- Former names: SIU Arena (1964-2019)
- Location: Arena Drive; Carbondale, Illinois, U.S.
- Coordinates: 37°42′30″N 89°13′7″W
- Owner: Southern Illinois University
- Operator: Southern Illinois University
- Capacity: 8,284
- Surface: Hardwood

Construction
- Groundbreaking: March 1962
- Opened: December 1, 1964
- Renovated: 2010
- Cost: $4.3 million ($44.6 million in 2025 dollars)
- Architects: Perkins & Will; 360 Architecture (renovation)

Tenant
- Southern Illinois men's basketball (NCAA) (1964–present) Southern Illinois women's basketball (NCAA) (1964–present)

Banterra Center (formerly SIU Arena) is an 8,284-seat multi-purpose arena, on the campus of Southern Illinois University, in Carbondale, Illinois, United States. Construction on the arena began in the spring of 1962 and took nearly two years to complete. It was completed in 1964 and is the home of the SIU Salukis basketball team.

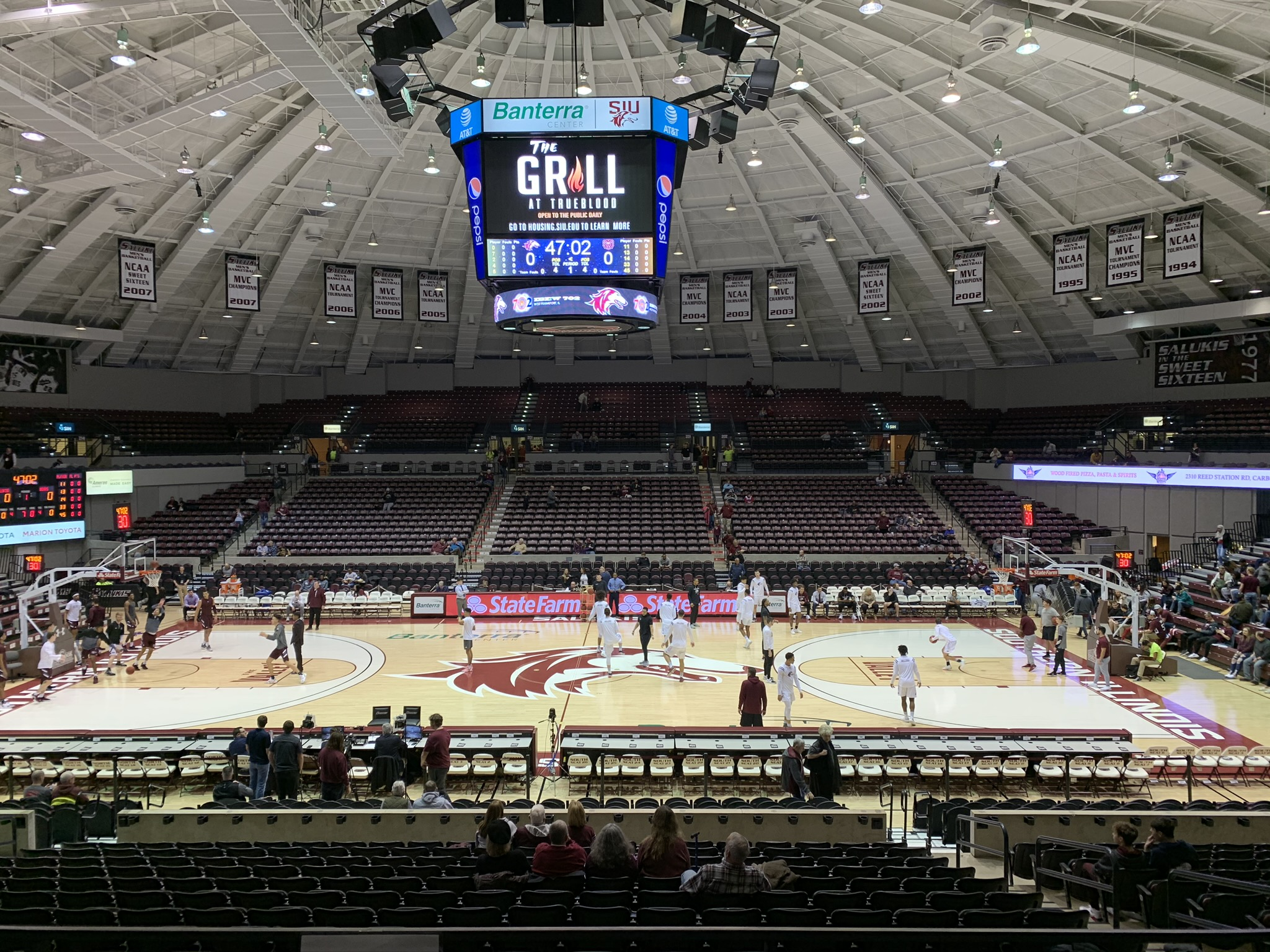
Banterra Center

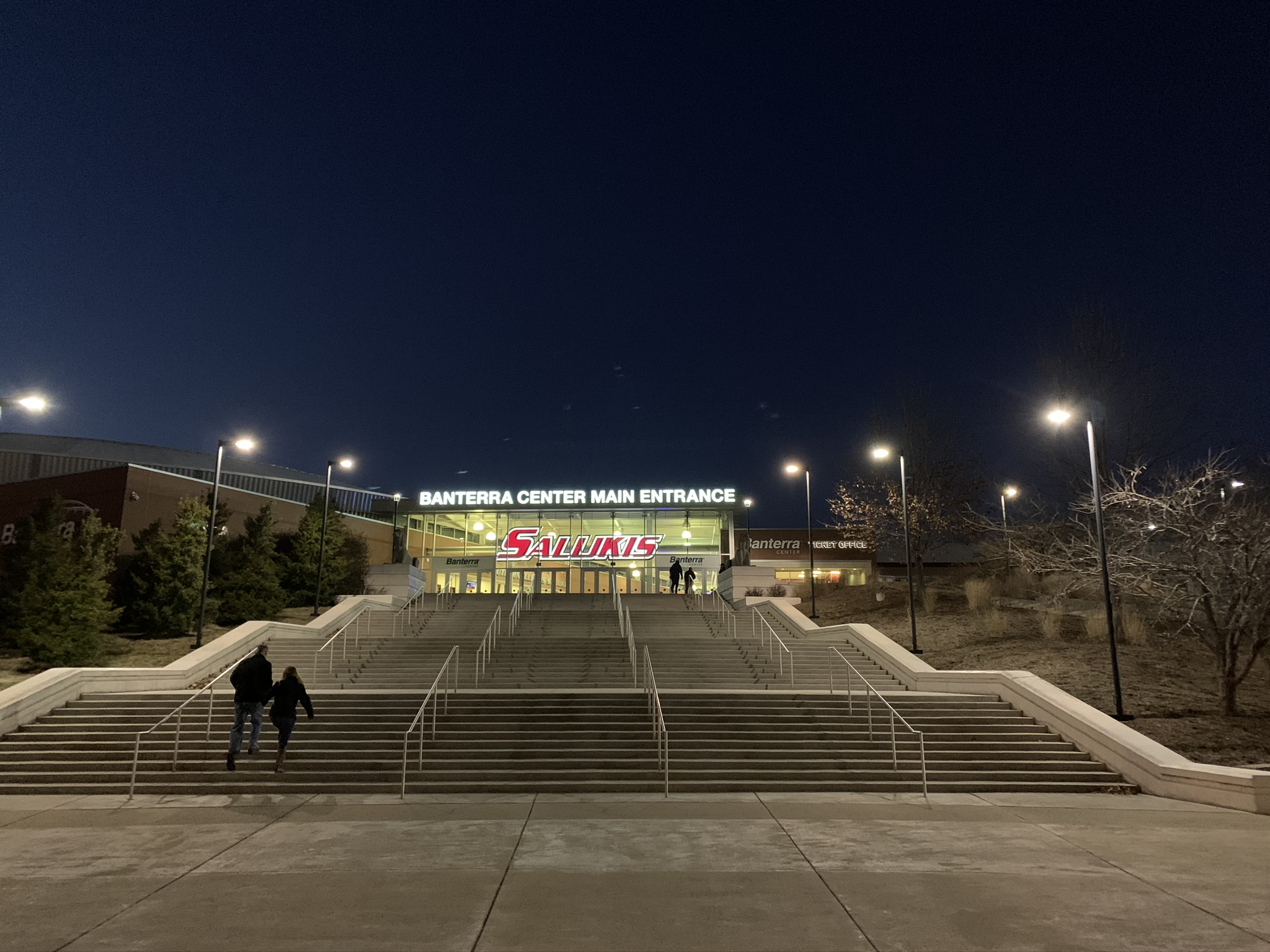
The entrance to the Banterra Center

== History ==
The basketball team played its first game in the new complex on December 1, 1964. The Salukis defeated Oklahoma State, 78–55, in the opener and went on to post a 14–1 record at home that season.

Two first-round games of the 1969 NCAA basketball tournament were played at the arena. An NBA regular-season game was also played there in 1969.

Peter Gabriel recorded part of his live album, Plays Live, at the SIU Arena in December 1983. Widespread Panic released a live album, containing their complete concert performance from 2000. In December 2003, it was also the site of a memorial service for the late U.S. Senator Paul Simon. In March 2009, Drake performed his first ever solo show in the US; he was booked at the last minute as a surprise to the students.

Johnny Cash played "The Johnny Cash Show" at the arena in October 1971 with June Carter Cash, The Statler Brothers, Carl Perkins and the Tennessee Three. Tickets at the time were $3 to $5.

In October 1976, Elvis Presley played to a sold-out crowd at the arena.

== Naming rights ==
On May 16, 2019, the university and Banterra Bank, a regional financial institution, announced agreement on a ten-year naming rights deal for the facility, the first in its 55-year history.

== See also ==
- List of NCAA Division I basketball arenas
