= Harrisburg Stampede =

American indoor football team

Logo

General information
- Founded: 2008
- Folded: 2024
- Headquartered: Harrisburg, Pennsylvania at the Pennsylvania Farm Show Complex & Expo Center
- Colors: Blue, White, Gold
- Mascot: Blitz the Bull
- HBGStampede.com

Personnel
- Owner: Dazzle Sports Group LLC
- General manager: Mike Jones
- Head coach: Bernie Nowotarski
- President: Justin Coble

Team history
- Harrisburg Stampede (2009–2014, 2024)

Home fields
- Pennsylvania Farm Show Complex & Expo Center (2009–2013, 2024); Giant Center (2014)

League / conference affiliations
- American Indoor Football Association (2009–2010); North Division (2009); Eastern Division (2010); Southern Indoor Football League (2011); Eastern Conference (2011); Northeast Division (2011); American Indoor Football (2012–2013, 2024); Eastern Conference (2012); Professional Indoor Football League (2014); National Conference (2014)

Championships
- League championships: 1: AIF: 2013

Playoff appearances (3)
- AIFA: 2010; AIF: 2012, 2013

The Harrisburg Stampede were a professional indoor football team based in Harrisburg, Pennsylvania. The Stampede participated in several different leagues over their history: the American Indoor Football Association in 2009 and 2010, the Southern Indoor Football League in 2011, American Indoor Football in 2012 and 2013, and the Professional Indoor Football League in what became their final season of play in 2014. The team suspended operations on December 30, 2014. In 2024, the team returned to play in the American Indoor Football league.

The Stampede play their home games at the Pennsylvania Farm Show Complex & Expo Center for their first five seasons from 2009 to 2013 and again in 2024. In 2014, they played in the Giant Center in nearby Hershey.

The "Stampede" name alludes to the team's home venue, which hosts the annual Pennsylvania Farm Show, and the team's colors are blue, black and white.

On August 18, 2023, American Indoor Football announced the return of the Stampede to its revived league. The Team has been brought back by former owner Justin Coble, local businessman and owner of Dazzle Sports Marketing. The team is owned by Dazzle Sports Group LLC DBA Harrisburg Stampede. They return to their original Bull Head logo and colors of Royal Blue and Gold. They played the 2024 season at the PA Farm Show Complex. They were to have joined the National Arena League for the 2025 season as a part of a merger with former AIF teams, but ceased operations on December 3, 2024.

== History ==
Original logo

=== 2009 ===
The team was co-founded by John Morris and Fred Clark. In September 2008, the team announced that they would use the nickname "Stampede" after narrowing a list of entries down to 3. In the Stampede's inaugural game, they beat an opposing team of American Indoor Football Association (AIFA) All-Stars, 46–26, in the 2009 AIFA Kickoff Classic. In their first regular season game, the Stampede were defeated by the reigning AIFA champion, Florence Phantoms by a score of 19–13. In their second ever regular season game, the Stampede defeated the Baltimore Mariners 37–34. After a 2–4 start, Morris fired head coach Kelly Logan and replaced him with defensive coordinator, Mike McDonald. Marques Colston, a New Orleans Saints wide receiver, held a share during the team's first season. Colston left the group after the inaugural season, citing philosophical differences.

==== 2009 season schedule ====
Date	Opponent	Home/Away	Result
March 14	Florence Phantoms	Away	Lost 13–19
March 28	Baltimore Mariners	Home	Won 37–34
April 4	South Carolina Force	Home	Lost 37–40
April 11	Columbus Lions	Home	Lost 33–35
April 18	Erie RiverRats	Away	Won 34–31
April 25	D.C. Armor	Away	Lost 26–44
May 2	Baltimore Mariners	Home	Lost 27–37
May 9	D.C. Armor	Home	Won 20–18
May 17	Reading Express	Away	Lost 6–44
May 23	Erie RiverRats	Away	Lost 44–54
May 30	Erie RiverRats	Home	Won 53–29
June 6	South Carolina Force	Home	Lost 30–36
June 13	Baltimore Mariners	Away	Lost 55–58
June 27	Reading Express	Home	Lost 19–41

=== 2010 ===
For the 2010 season, the team hired Ramon Robinson as their head coach. Robinson helped the Stampede turn their record around, leading them to an 11–3 regular season record, clinching a playoff spot. The #2 seeded Stampede defeated the #3 Erie Storm by a score of 52–48 in the first Stampede playoff game ever. The following week, the Stampede were defeated by the undefeated Mariners by a score of 65–13 in the Eastern Conference Championship Game.

=== 2011 ===
The Stampede began the 2011 season by naming Bernie Nowotarski the team's head coach and general manager. 2011 also brought a new league for the Stampede, as they moved into the Southern Indoor Football League (SIFL) after the merger of the AIFA's Eastern Conference with the SIFL After an 0–6 start to the 2011 season, Nowotarski was removed as General Manager and Head Coach of the Stampede. He was replaced by Josh Resignalo. The following season, the SIFL disbanded, leading the Stampede to re-join their former league, which is now going by American Indoor Football (AIF).

=== 2012 ===
In 2012, the team joined American Indoor Football (AIF), the league was run by previous AIFA owner/CEO John Morris. In January 2012, Morris sold the team to local businessman Justin Coble, who made moves to broaden the fan base and re-energize the city of Harrisburg about the Stampede team; Colston returned to the team's ownership group just prior to the start of the 2012 season.

=== 2013 ===
As of August 2012 Marques Colston's Dynasty Group acquired full control of the team and had continued to grow the footprint of the Stampede with its primary mission of servicing the community in the Greater Harrisburg area. The Stampede advanced to the AIF Championship Game for the second straight year in 2013, this time defeating the Cape Fear Heroes 57-42 earning their first ever title.

=== 2014 ===
In September 2013, the Stampede announced that they would be joining the Professional Indoor Football League for the 2014 season.

After the 2014 season, on December 30, 2014, Colston shuttered the team due to financial problems and purchased a stake in the Philadelphia Soul of the Arena Football League.

=== 2024 ===
In August 2023 local businessman Justin Coble announced he was bringing back the Harrisburg Stampede to AIF for the 2024 season. With a revamped team, return to old logo and colors, and playing back in the original location the New Harrisburg Stampede returned.

On July 9, 2024, the Stampede had joined the Corpus Christi Tritons and Columbus Lions as these AIF teams moved to the National Arena League as part of a supposed "merger" between the two leagues. It turned out only the Lions and Stampede joined the NAL, the Tritons went to Arena Football One and the AIF was relaunched with two other remaining teams. On December 3, 2024, the Stampede announced on their Facebook page that they were ceasing operations.

== Season-by-season results ==
League champions	Conference champions	Division champions	Playoff berth	League leader

Season	Team	League	Conference	Division	Regular season			Postseason results
Season	Team	League	Conference	Division	Finish	Wins	Losses	Postseason results
2009	2009	AIFA		North	3rd	4	10	Did not qualify
2010	2010	AIFA		Eastern	2nd	11	3	Won Eastern Division Wild Card (Erie) 52–48; Lost Eastern Division Championship (Baltimore) 63–15
2011	2011	SIFL	Eastern	Northeast	3rd	2	10	Did not qualify
2012	2012	AIF	Eastern		2nd	6	1	Won Eastern Conference Wild Card (Carolina) 68–20; Lost Eastern Conference Championship (Cape Fear) 32–57
2013	2013	AIF			2nd	6	2	Won Wild Card (York) 51–41; Won AIF Championship Bowl VI (Cape Fear) 57–42
2014	2014	PIFL	National		4th	4	8	Did not qualify
2015	Dormant year							
2016	Dormant year							
2017	Dormant year							
2018	Dormant year							
2019	Dormant year							
2020	Dormant year							
2021	Dormant year							
2022	Dormant year							
2023	Dormant year							
2024	2024	AIF			3rd	1	3	Did not qualify
Totals						34	37	All-time regular season record
Totals						4	2	All-time postseason record
Totals						38	39	All-time regular season and postseason record

== Head coaches ==
Note: Statistics are correct through the 2024 American Indoor Football season.

Name	Tenure	Regular season			Playoffs		Awards
Name	Tenure	W	L	Win%	W	L	Awards
Ramon Robinson	2009–2010	15	13	.536	1	1	
Bernie Nowotarski	2011–2014, 2024	19	24	.442	3	1	

== All-league players ==
The following Stampede players were named to All-League Teams:

- QB E. J. Nemeth (3)
- RB Victory Sesay
- WR Scorpio Brown (2), Colis Martin (2), Jerrell Jones
- OL Randall Bennett (2), Adam Hoffman, Troy Bennett
- DL Daniel Orlebar (2), Fearon Wright (2), Jashawn Williams, Amara Kamara
- LB Vincent Tiberi (2), Jermaine Thaxton (3), Will Hines (4)
- DB Richard Johnson, Armar Watson (2), Travis Proctor
- K Cap Poklemba
- KR Armar Watson (2)
