= Maryland Scholastic Hockey League =

Maryland Student Hockey League
- Abbreviation: MSHL
- Website: http://www.mshl.org/

== League information ==
The Maryland Student Hockey League is an association of over 50 school-based teams located in Maryland and the District of Columbia. It is a registered 501(c)3 corporation and a member of the Potomac Valley Amateur Hockey Association which is the local governing body of USA Hockey, the National Governing Body of amateur ice hockey in the United States. The sanctioned varsity teams are divided into sections used by every sport under MSHL. The League sponsors Varsity and Junior Varsity competition of all skill levels and sexes. While not affiliated with the Maryland Public Secondary School Athletic Association, the MSHL follows many of the MPSSAA's rules and regulations as possible, given the constraints imposed by the various schools and school systems. The sanctioned teams compete from the beginning of November until the end of February with the maximum number of games.

== Playoff format ==
The MSHL State playoffs consists of 16 teams. Each conference is allocated a set number of teams in the tournament as follows:

Montgomery Hockey Conference (1st division only) – 4 teams,
Eastern Conference – 4 teams,
Howard County Scholastic Hockey Association – 3 teams,
Monocacy Valley Hockey League – 3 teams,
Southern Conference – 2 teams,

Each conference determines which teams are their entrants and in what order they are seeded within the conference. Teams are then entered into pods:

Pod 1: Montgomery #1, Eastern #1, Howard #1, MVHL #1, Southern #1,
Pod 2: Montgomery #2, Eastern #2, Howard #2, MVHL #2, Southern #2,
Pod 3: Montgomery #3, Eastern #3, Howard #3, MVHL #3,
Pod 4: Montgomery #4, Eastern #4.

Seeds within a pod are determined by a blind draw. Teams in Pod 1 are seeded 1 to 5, Pod 2 - 6 to 10, Pod 3 - 11 to 14 and Pod 4 - seeds 15 and 16. Teams will then be entered in the bracket and the only adjustments permitted for the 1st round are that teams from the same conference will not face each other in round 1. Other than the instance(s) described above, there is no reseeding of the tournament before each round. Dates for the 2018 State playoffs are as follows:

Round 1 - February 12–16, 2018 at various rinks,
Quarterfinals - February 20 at Laurel,
Semifinals - February 22 at Laurel,
Finals - February 26 at Laurel.

== MSHL Teams ==
School	Nickname	Status	Conference	Playoff finals appearances	Championships	Notes
Arundel	Wildcats	Co-op	Eastern			
Atholton	Raiders	Pure	Howard		2011-2012	
Bel Air	Bobcats	Pure	Eastern			Established as an expansion from Fallston prior to the start of the 2017–2018 season
Bethesda - Chevy Chase	Barons	Pure	Montgomery Division 1			
Blake / Poolesville (C)	Griffins	Co-op	Montgomery Division 2			
Bowie (I)	Bulldogs	Pure	Independent			
Broadneck	Bruins	Pure	Eastern			
Carroll County (C)	Bears	Co-op	Monocacy Valley			
Chessie (C)	Chessie	Co-op	Eastern			
Damascus/Gaithersburg/Clarksburg (C)	Hornets	Co-op	Montgomery Division 2			
DC Stars (C)	Stars	Co-op	Montgomery Division 2			Made up of various schools in DC that don't have their own hockey team.
Dulaney (C)	Lions	Co-op	Eastern			Established in 2008 and open to students from all Baltimore County and City of Baltimore public schools as well as private schools from the same area without their own hockey teams.
Easton	Warriors	Pure	Eastern	2012-2013		
Eleanor Roosevelt (C)	Raiders	Co-op	Southern			
Long Reach / Centennial (C)	Thunderbirds	Co-op	Howard			
Fallston (C)	Tigers	Co-op	Eastern			
Frederick County (C)	FCHC - Kings	Co-op	Monocacy Valley	2008-2009*** Linganore		
Glenelg	Gladiators	Pure	Howard		2009-2010	
Howard	Lions	Pure	Howard			
Huntingtown	Hurricanes	Pure	Southern	2011-2012		
Kent Island	Buccaneers	Pure	Eastern			
La Plata	Panthers	Pure	Southern			
Leonardtown	Raiders	Pure	Southern	2006–2007, 2013-2014		
Marriotts Ridge	Mustangs	Pure	Howard	2014–2015, 2016-2017		
Middletown Valley (C)	Knights	Co-op	Monocacy Valley			
Montgomery Blair (C)	Blazers	Co-op	Montgomery Division 1			
Mt. Hebron	Vikings	Pure	Howard			
Northern	Patriots	Pure	Southern			
Oakdale	Bears	Pure	Monocacy Valley	2017-2018, 2021-2022	2023-2024, 2024-2025, 2025-2026	
Patuxent (C)	Panthers	Co-op	Southern			
Queen Anne's County	Lions	Pure	Eastern			
Quince Orchard	Cougars	Pure	Montgomery Division 1			
Reservoir	Gators	Pure	Howard			
Richard Montgomery	Rockets	Pure	Montgomery Division 2			
River Hill	Hawks	Pure	Howard			
Rockville / Magruder (C)	Rams	Co-op	Montgomery Division 2			Rockville, Magruder, Heights School, McLean School, St. Andrews Episcopal School, and Charles E. Smith Jewish Day School
Severna Park	Spockey	Pure	Eastern	2005-2006		
Sherwood	Warriors	Pure	Montgomery Division 2		2003-2004**	
South River	Seahawks	Pure	Eastern		2006-2007	
St. Mary's Ryken II	Knights	Pure	Southern			
Charles County (C)	Cougars	Co-op	Southern			
Urbana	Hawks	Pure	Monocacy Valley	2010-2011, 2025-2026		
Walkersville/ Frederick/ St. Johns (C)	Lions	Co-op	Monocacy Valley			
Walt Whitman	Vikings	Pure	Montgomery Division 1	2009-2010, 2010-2011	2011-2012	2011-2012
Walter Johnson	Wildcats	Pure	Montgomery Division 1		2004-2005, 2022-2023	
Washington County (C)	Northstars	Co-op	Monocacy Valley			
WL / HAM / OM (C)	Wolves	Co-op	Howard	2007-2008*		Wilde Lake, Hammond, and Oakland Mills
Winston Churchill	Bulldogs	Pure	Montgomery Division 1	2004-2005, 2022-2023	2005–2006, 2010–2011, 2012–2013, 2014–2015, 2015–2016, 2016–2017, 2017–2018, 2018-2019, 2019-2020, 2021-2022	
Woodrow Wilson	Tigers	Pure	Montgomery Division 2			Offshoot of the DC Stars; 2017-2018 first season
Wootton	Patriots	Pure	Montgomery Division 1	2018-2019	2007–2008, 2008–2009, 2013-2014	
Non MSHL Boys Varsity Team		Pure	Independent			
Non-MSHL Varsity Boys Team 2		Pure	Independent			
