= Ontario Warriors =

Former American indoor football team

- Founded: 2011
- League: American Indoor Football
- Team history: Ontario Warriors (2012)
- Based in: Ontario, California
- Arena: Citizens Business Bank Arena
- Colors: Black, Red, Silver, White
- Owner: American Indoor Football
- President: Tom Mitchell
- Head coach: Keith Evans
- Dancers: The VIXENS

The Ontario Warriors were a team in American Indoor Football that played in 2012. Based in Ontario, California, the Warriors played their home games at Citizens Business Bank Arena.

The Warriors were the first men's indoor football team to play out of the city of Ontario, and the second in the Inland Empire, following the San Bernardino Bucking Bulls of the National Indoor Football League which played in 2007 before the team and league folded. (The Warriors were also preceded by the Los Angeles Temptation, who relocated to the Inland Empire in fall 2011.)

== Season-by-season ==
Season records
Season	W	L	T	Finish	Playoff results
2012	7	0	0	Won the Division	
