= Carolina Force =

Logo

General information
- Founded: 2012
- Folded: 2013
- Headquartered: Concord, North Carolina at the Cabarrus Arena & Events Center
- Colors: Red, White, & Blue

Personnel
- Owner: American Indoor Football
- Head coach: Kent Merideth (initial head coach); Bobby Rome II (interim coach)
- President: Norman Washington

Team history
- Carolina Force (2012)

Home fields
- Cabarrus Arena & Events Center (2012)

League / conference affiliations
- American Indoor Football (2012)

Playoff appearances (1)
- 2012

The Carolina Force was a professional indoor American football team situated in Concord, North Carolina. The team began play in 2012 as an expansion member of American Indoor Football (AIF). The Force played their home games at the Cabarrus Arena & Events Center.

The Force is the second arena/indoor football team to be based in Concord, following the Carolina Speed which played at the Cabarrus Arena in 2007 and 2008 before moving to Charlotte and the Bojangles' Coliseum the following year.

The Force name is derived from a previous AIFA team, the South Carolina Force.

== Notable players ==
All-league selections

- WR Jasonus Tillery

== Statistics and records ==
=== Season-by-season results ===
Note: The finish, wins, losses, and ties columns list regular season results and exclude any postseason play.

League champions	Conference champions	Division champions	Wild card berth	League leader

Season	Team	League	Conference	Division	Regular season				Postseason results
Season	Team	League	Conference	Division	Finish	Wins	Losses	Ties	Postseason results
2012	2012	AIF	Eastern		3rd	3	3	0	Lost Eastern Semifinal (Harrisburg) 20-68
Totals						3	3	0	All-time regular season record (2012)
Totals						0	0	-	All-time postseason record (2012)
Totals						3	3	0	All-time regular season and postseason record (2012)
