= West Virginia Badgers =

Virginia Badgers
Logo

General information
- Founded: 2011
- Folded: 2013
- Headquartered: Charles Town, West Virginia
- Colors: Cardinal, White, Black

Team history
- Virginia Badgers (2012); West Virginia Badgers (2013)

Home fields
- Travel Team Only (2012–2013)

League / conference affiliations
- American Indoor Football (2012-2013)

Championships
- League championships: 0; 0
- Division championships: 0; 0

The West Virginia Badgers were a professional indoor football team based in Charles Town, West Virginia. The Badgers were a member of American Indoor Football (AIF). The Badgers began play in 2012 as an expansion member of the AIF. In 2012, they were based in Fredericksburg, Virginia, and were known as the Virginia Badgers. The Badgers played all their games on the road for their two seasons in the AIF.

== Season-by-season ==
Season records
Season	W	L	T	Finish	Playoff results
2012	0	0	3	7th, Eastern Conference	Did not reach playoffs
2013	0	0	4	4th	Did not reach playoffs
