= J. E. Dunn Construction Group =

Privately owned construction company in the United States

J.E. Dunn Construction Group
- Industry: Construction
- Headquarters: Kansas City, Missouri, United States
- Number of employees: 4,000 (2026)
- Website: jedunn.com

J. E. Dunn Construction Group is an American privately held construction company headquartered in Kansas City, Missouri founded in 1924 by John Ernest Dunn.

== History ==
The company was founded in Kansas City, Missouri, in 1924 by John Ernest Dunn as a residential contractor, and later moved into commercial, institutional, and public building work. During World War II, the firm built the Quartermaster Depot, a wartime supply facility in Kansas City, at cost. Leadership of the company remained within the Dunn family for three generations: Dunn's son William H. Dunn Sr. took over the business after the founder's death in the mid-1960s, and William's son Terrence P. Dunn was named chief executive officer in 1989. Terrence Dunn served as president and chief executive officer of the holding company, incorporated as Dunn Industries, Inc. and later renamed J.E. Dunn Construction Group, Inc., until his retirement in 2015.

Beginning in 1990, the company expanded beyond Kansas City through a series of acquisitions, purchasing a controlling interest in Witcher Construction of Minneapolis in 1990, Drake Construction Company of Portland, Oregon, in 1992, the Houston-based LTB Contractors and Hughes/Smith, Inc. of Colorado Springs, Colorado, in the late 1990s, and R.J. Griffin & Company of Atlanta in January 2000.

In 2010, the company established an employee stock ownership plan, transitioning from sole family ownership to combined family and employee ownership.

Gordon Lansford III, who had served as chief financial officer for 15 years, became president and chief executive officer of JE Dunn Construction Company on January 1, 2014, the first person outside the Dunn family to hold the position. In 2019, the Dunn family and the company were part of the investment group led by John Sherman that purchased the Kansas City Royals of Major League Baseball. By 2024, it operated 26 offices in the United States and employed more than 4,000 people.

In 2026, Kevin Grimm, a former foreman for J.E. Dunn pleaded guilty to a felony theft charge for stealing over $60,000 of medical equipment and construction equipment from his jobsite at University of Iowa Hospitals & Clinics, including regulated medical equipment that is only allowed to be owned by medical providers. He used his access to facility as a contractor to steal from the hospital that was being built, and sold what he had stolen on eBay and Facebook Marketplace. The hospital security received a tip about stolen hospital items on eBay, and information in the posted pictures and photos with the jobsite linked the incident to Grimm. The Board of Regents has hired the company as the manager of the North Liberty project at UIHC.

Engineering News-Record listed J.E. Dunn as the 21st highest revenue contractor in 2026.
