= 2011 Erie Explosion season =

- Owner: Bill Stafford
- General manager: Shawn Liotta
- Head coach: Shawn Liotta
- Home stadium: Louis J. Tullio Arena

Results
- Record: 9–3
- Division place: 1st
- Playoffs: Lost Eastern Conference Round 1 (vs. Albany Panthers) 68–43

The 2011 SIFL season was the 5th season for the Erie Explosion in the Southern Indoor Football League (SIFL).

On December 3, 2010, the team announced its new identity as the Erie Explosion, including a new logo, but retaining the same color scheme as the Storm previously had. After dealing with the legalities of the previous name, the ownership of the Explosion have secured the legal trademark of the new name, ensuring that this will be the last re-brand in the foreseeable future. The Erie Explosion was also one of 6 AIFA teams which were merged with the Southern Indoor Football League (SIFL) prior to the 2011 season. The Explosion announced the signing of Quarterback, Adam DiMichele, along with former local Erie Strong Vincent star, Maurice Williams, and college star receiver David Ball.

On May 21, 2011, the Explosion set a single-game franchise record, including an unofficial indoor football record, for the most points scored in a 138–0 blowout win over the Fayetteville Force after the Force was forced to restock its team with scrubs in an ownership change. The margin of victory is the third-highest in all of professional football, and the highest in over 100 years: only the 1903 Massillon Tigers (who won a game 148–0) and 1904 Watertown Red & Black (who won a game 142–0) have had wider margins of victory.

The Explosion finished the season with a 9–4 record, winning the Northeast Division, but were defeated 68–43 by the Albany Panthers in the first round of the playoffs. Despite the playoff loss, DiMichele was named SIFL MVP, finishing the season with 91 touchdown passes.

== Roster ==
2011 Erie Explosion roster
Quarterbacks: 13 Adam DiMichele; Running backs: 99 Bob Hammer; Wide receivers: -- David Ball; 1 Kevin Concepcion; 6 Terry Jackson; 8 Tirone Morris; -- Maurice Williams	Offensive linemen: 62 Joe Blanks; -- Mike Fazio; -- Ron Idoko; Defensive linemen: -- Andre Mathis; -- Jerrickus Speights; Linebackers: 2 Roosevelt Benjamin	Defensive backs: 11 Sam Reynolds; 3 Lenny Wicks; Kickers: currently vacant	Injured reserve: currently vacant; Exempt list: currently vacant; Practice squad: currently vacant; rookies in italics; Roster updated February 19, 2013; 15 Active, 0 Inactive, 0 PS

== Schedule ==
=== Regular season ===
The Tullio Arena scoreboard following the Explosion's record-setting game from 2011.

Date	Opponent	Home/Away	Result
March 20	Harrisburg Stampede	Away	Won 46–25
March 26	Trenton Steel	Away	Won 76–73
April 1	Carolina Speed	Away	Won 39–36
April 9	Trenton Steel	Home	Lost 62–65
April 15	Harrisburg Stampede	Home	Won 89–35
April 23	Richmond Raiders	Home	Won 74–54
April 30	Harrisburg Stampede	Away	Lost 40–41
May 7	Richmond Raiders	Away	Won 65–50
May 13	Trenton Steel	Home	Won 90–79
May 21	Fayetteville Force	Home	Won 138–0
May 26	Trenton Steel	Away	Lost 78–53
June 4	Harrisburg Stampede	Home	Won 71–32

=== Postseason ===
Date	Opponent	Home/Away	Result
June 18	Albany Panthers	Away	Lost 43–68

=== Standings ===
Team	Overall			Division		
Team	Wins	Losses	Percentage	Wins	Losses	Percentage
Eastern Conference
Northeast Division
Erie Explosion	9	3	0.750	5	3	0.625
Trenton Steel	8	4	0.667	6	2	0.750
Harrisburg Stampede	2	10	0.167	1	7	0.125
Mid-Atlantic Division
Richmond Raiders*	6	6	0.500	3	1	0.750
Carolina Speed	3	9	0.250	2	2	0.250
Fayetteville Force	3	9	0.250	1	3	0.250
South Division
Columbus Lions	11	1	0.917	5	1	0.833
Albany Panthers	9	2	0.818	4	2	0.667
Alabama Hammers	3	8	0.273	0	6	0.000
Western Conference
Gulf Division
Louisiana Swashbucklers	8	4	0.667	1	0	1.000
Mobile Bay Tarpons**	2	3	0.500	0	1	0.000
Lafayette Wildcatters***	0	12	0.000	0	12	0.000
Southwest Division
Houston Stallions	12	0	1.000	8	0	1.000
Corpus Christi Hammerheads	7	5	0.583	3	4	0.429
Rio Grande Valley Magic	6	6	0.500	3	6	0.333
Abilene Ruff Riders	4	8	0.333	1	6	0.143

- Green indicates clinched playoff berth
- Purple indicates division champion
- Grey indicates best league record
- * = Failed to make the playoffs despite winning division
- ** = Folded five games into their season.
- *** = Suspended operations prior to the season due to lack of Worker's Compensation Insurance
