= 2011 Richmond Raiders season =

American indoor football team season

- Owner: Mike & Elizabeth Fraizer
- Head coach: James Fuller
- Home stadium: Richmond Coliseum

Results
- Record: 6-6
- Division place: 1st
- Playoffs: did not qualify

The 2011 Richmond Raiders season was the second season as a professional indoor football franchise and their first in the Southern Indoor Football League (SIFL). One of 16 teams competing in the SIFL for the 2011 season.

Chris Simpson became the head coach of the Raiders for the 2011 season, coming over from the defunct Baltimore Mariners. Simpson didn't make it to opening day, though, as he "relocated to Texas to pursue family business opportunities". He was replaced by James Fuller, who was the interim head coach for the AFL Dallas Vigilantes in 2010.

Former Richmond Revolution head coach Steve Criswell signed with the Raiders as a senior consultant for the 2011 season. Criswell brought several former Revolution players along, including QB Bryan Randall and DL Lawrence Lewis.

The Raiders earned a 6-6 record, placing 1st in the Mid-Atlantic division, but due to league playoff qualifying rules, did not make the playoffs, as 4 other Eastern Conference teams had a better record.

== Schedule ==
Key: Win Tie Loss Bye

=== Preseason ===
| Week | Date | Kickoff | Opponent | Results | | Attendance |
| Week | Date | Kickoff | Opponent | Final Score | Team record | Attendance |
|---|---|---|---|---|---|---|
| | March 11 (Fri) | 7:00 PM | Harrisburg Stampede | 52-7 | 0-0 | |

=== Regular season ===
| Week | Date | Kickoff | Opponent | Results | | Attendance |
| Week | Date | Kickoff | Opponent | Final Score | Team record | Attendance |
|---|---|---|---|---|---|---|
| 1 | March 19 (Sat) | 7:00 PM | Trenton Steel | 59-56 | 1-0 | 2,457 |
| 2 | March 27 (Sun) | TBD | at Columbus Lions | 30-44 | 1-1 | |
| 3 | April 2 (Sat) | TBD | at Harrisburg Stampede | 59-41 | 2-1 | |
| 4 | April 9 (Sat) | 7:00 PM | Alabama Hammers | 54-29 | 3-1 | 2,060 |
| 5 | April 16 (Sat) | 7:00 PM | Fayetteville Force | 61-43 | 4-1 | 2,866 |
| 6 | April 23 (Sat) | TBD | at Erie Explosion | 54-74 | 4-2 | |
| 7 | April 30 (Sat) | TBD | at Albany Panthers | 46-61 | 4-3 | 5,147 |
| 8 | May 7 (Sat) | 7:00 PM | Erie Explosion | 50-65 | 4-4 | 2,471 |
| 9 | Bye | | | | | |
| 10 | May 20 (Fri) | TBD | at Carolina Speed | 48-50 | 4-5 | |
| 11 | May 28 (Sat) | 7:00 PM | Albany Panthers | 42-48 | 4-6 | 2,505 |
| 12 | June 4 (Sat) | 7:00 PM | Carolina Speed | 37-36 | 5-6 | |
| 13 | June 11 (Sat) | TBD | at Fayetteville Force | 88-6 | 6-6 | |

== Roster ==
2011 Richmond Raiders roster
| Quarterbacks: 6 Aaron Alexander; 10 Mike Potts; Running backs: currently vacant; Wide receivers: 5 Herb Jones; 7 Rodney Landers | Offensive linemen: 78 Kynneth Moses; Defensive linemen: currently vacant | Linebackers: 11 Vince Hall; Defensive backs: 22 Stephen Cason; 2 Damon Thompson; Kickers: -- J. R. Cipra | Injured reserve: 3 Bryan Randall QB (IR); Exempt list: currently vacant; [Roster] updated June 11, 2011; 9 Active, 1 Inactive → More rosters |

== Division Standings ==
| Team | Overall | | | Division | | |
| Team | Wins | Losses | Percentage | Wins | Losses | Percentage |
|---|---|---|---|---|---|---|
Eastern Conference
Northeast Division
| Erie Explosion | 9 | 3 | 0.750 | 5 | 3 | 0.625 |
| Trenton Steel | 8 | 4 | 0.667 | 6 | 2 | 0.750 |
| Harrisburg Stampede | 2 | 10 | 0.167 | 1 | 7 | 0.125 |
Mid-Atlantic Division
| Richmond Raiders* | 6 | 6 | 0.500 | 3 | 1 | 0.750 |
| Carolina Speed | 3 | 9 | 0.250 | 2 | 2 | 0.250 |
| Fayetteville Force | 3 | 9 | 0.250 | 1 | 3 | 0.250 |
South Division
| Columbus Lions | 11 | 1 | 0.917 | 5 | 1 | 0.833 |
| Albany Panthers | 9 | 2 | 0.818 | 4 | 2 | 0.667 |
| Alabama Hammers | 3 | 8 | 0.273 | 0 | 6 | 0.000 |
Western Conference
Gulf Division
| Louisiana Swashbucklers | 8 | 4 | 0.667 | 1 | 0 | 1.000 |
| Mobile Bay Tarpons** | 2 | 3 | 0.500 | 0 | 1 | 0.000 |
| Lafayette Wildcatters*** | 0 | 12 | 0.000 | 0 | 12 | 0.000 |
Southwest Division
| Houston Stallions | 12 | 0 | 1.000 | 8 | 0 | 1.000 |
| Corpus Christi Hammerheads | 7 | 5 | 0.583 | 3 | 4 | 0.429 |
| Rio Grande Valley Magic | 6 | 6 | 0.500 | 3 | 6 | 0.333 |
| Abilene Ruff Riders | 4 | 8 | 0.333 | 1 | 6 | 0.143 |

- Green indicates clinched playoff berth
- Purple indicates division champion
- Grey indicates best league record
- * = Failed to make the playoffs despite winning division
- ** = Folded five games into their season.
- *** = Suspended operations prior to the season due to lack of Worker's Compensation Insurance
