= 2010 Abilene Ruff Riders season =

Professional indoor football series

- Owner: Scott Anderson; Paul Briscoe; Randy Fry; Derek Hood; Michael Redden
- General manager: David Sauerr
- Head coach: Gerald Dockery
- Home stadium: Taylor County Expo Center; 1700 Texas 36; Abilene, TX 79602

Results
- Record: 2-12
- Division place: 3rd Lonestar West
- Playoffs: did not qualify

The 2010 Abilene Ruff Riders season was the team's fourth season as a professional indoor football franchise and second in the Indoor Football League (IFL). One of twenty-five teams competing in the IFL for the 2010 season, the Abilene, Texas-based Abilene Ruff Riders were members of the Lonestar West Division of the Intense Conference.

Under the leadership of head coach Gerald Dockery, the team played their home games at the Taylor County Expo Center in Abilene, Texas.

== Schedule ==
Win Tie Loss Bye

=== Regular season ===
Week	Day	Date	Kickoff	Opponent	Results		Location	Attendance
Week	Day	Date	Kickoff	Opponent	Final Score	Team Record	Location	Attendance
1	Bye							
2	Saturday	March 6	7:05pm	West Texas Roughnecks	L 33-36	0-1	Taylor County Expo Center	3,126
3	Bye							
4	Saturday	March 20	7:00pm	San Angelo Stampede Express	L 27-38	0-2	American Bank Center	5,032
5	Saturday	March 27	7:00pm	at Arkansas Diamonds	L 34-53	0-3	Verizon Arena	
6	Saturday	April 3	7:05pm	at San Angelo Stampede Express	L 37-39	0-4	San Angelo Coliseum	2,244
7	Saturday	April 10	6:30pm	at Austin Turfcats	L 34-68	0-5	Luedecke Arena	
8	Saturday	April 17	7:05pm	Corpus Christi Hammerheads	W 48-31	1-5	Taylor County Expo Center	3,026
9	Saturday	April 24	7:00pm	Arkansas Diamond	L 23-26	1-6	Taylor County Expo Center	2,810
10	Saturday	May 1	7:05pm	at Amarillo Venom	L 50-58	1-7	Amarillo Civic Center	2,826
11	Saturday	May 8	7:05pm	at San Angelo Stampede Express	L 37-46	1-8	San Angelo Coliseum	
12	Sunday	May 15	7:00pm	Austin Turfcats	W 47-20	2-8	Taylor County Expo Center	3,091
13	Saturday	May 22	7:00pm	West Texas Roughnecks	L 51-54	2-9	Taylor County Expo Center	3,318
14	Saturday	May 29	7:15pm	Amarillo Venom	L 22-56	2-10	Taylor County Expo Center	3,611
15	Sunday	June 6	4:05pm	at Corpus Christi Hammerheads	L 46-49	2-11	American Bank Center	
16	Saturday	June 12	7:00pm	at West Texas Roughnecks	L 55-70	2-12	Ector County Coliseum	
17	Bye							

== Standings ==
2010 Lonestar West Division
	W	L	T	PCT	GB	DIV	PF	PA	STK
y-Amarillo Venom	11	3	0	0.786	---	4-0	702	509	L1
x-West Texas Roughnecks	7	7	0	0.500	4.0	3-2	594	655	W4
Abilene Ruff Riders	2	12	0	0.143	9.0	0-5	544	644	L4

== Roster ==
2010 Abilene Ruff Riders roster
Quarterbacks: 17 Larry Dockery; 2 Robert Kent; Running backs: 12 Carlos Alsup; Wide receivers: 5 LeJuan Edwards; 1 Robert Gill; 81 Fred Howze; 7 Ivory McCann; 80 Desmond Sanders	Offensive linemen: 75 Doug Bond; 79 Jake Helmes; 68 Marcus Lindsey; 55 Preston Taylor; Defensive linemen: 9 Anthony Hines; 28 Jon Johnson; 19 Vincent Rhodes	Linebackers: 34 Nate Jackson; 21 Archie Reed; Defensive backs: 3 Santino Hall; 24 Wali Mumin; 11 Darvin Peterson; Kickers: 20 Oscar Moreno	Injured Reserve: currently vacant; Exempt List: currently vacant; Practice squad: currently vacant; rookies in italics Roster updated June 12, 2010; 21 Active, 0 Inactive, 0 PS → More rosters
