= 2010 West Texas Roughnecks season =

Indoor Football League team season

- Owner: Jay Morris; Dale Morris
- General manager: Harold Fuller
- Head coach: Chris Williams
- Home stadium: Ector County Coliseum; 4201 Andrews Highway; Odessa, TX 79762

Results
- Record: 7-7
- Division place: 2nd Lonestar West
- Playoffs: Lost quarterfinals 36-56 (Venom)

The 2010 West Texas Roughnecks season was the team's seventh season as a professional indoor football franchise and first in the Indoor Football League (IFL). One of twenty-five teams competing in the IFL for the 2010 season, the Odessa, Texas-based West Texas Roughnecks were members of the Lonestar West Division of the Intense Conference.

Under the leadership of head coach Chris Williams, the team played their home games at the Ector County Coliseum in Odessa, Texas.

The Roughnecks lost to the Amarillo Venom 36–56 in the Intense Conference Wild Card round.

== Schedule ==
Win Tie Loss Bye

=== Regular season ===
Week	Day	Date	Kickoff	Opponent	Results		Location
Week	Day	Date	Kickoff	Opponent	Final score	Team record	Location
1	Bye						
2	Saturday	March 6	7:05pm	at Abilene Ruff Riders	W 36-33	1-0	Taylor County Expo Center
3	Saturday	March 13	7:11pm	Amarillo Venom	L 27-53	1-1	Ector County Coliseum
4	Sunday	March 21	4:05pm	at Corpus Christi Hammerheads	L 35-47	1-2	American Bank Center
5	Saturday	March 27	7:05pm	at Amarillo Venom	L 33-55	1-3	Amarillo Civic Center
6	Bye						
7	Saturday	April 10	7:05pm	at San Angelo Stampede Express	L 35-44	1-4	San Angelo Coliseum
8	Saturday	April 17	7:11pm	Austin Turfcats	W 49-46	2-4	Ector County Coliseum
9	Saturday	April 24	7:15pm	San Angelo Stampede Express	L 27-60	2-5	Ector County Coliseum
10	Saturday	May 1	7:05pm	at Arkansas Diamonds	L 28-71	2-6	Verizon Arena
11	Saturday	May 8	6:30pm	at Austin Turfcats	W 46-29	3-6	Luedecke Arena
12	Sunday	May 15	7:11pm	Arkansas Diamonds	L 29-41	3-7	Ector County Coliseum
13	Saturday	May 22	7:00pm	at Abilene Ruff Riders	W 54-51	4-7	Taylor County Expo Center
14	Saturday	May 29	7:15pm	Corpus Christi Hammerheads	W 50-38	5-7	Ector County Coliseum
15	Bye						
16	Saturday	June 12	7:00pm	Abilene Ruff Riders	W 70-55	6-7	Ector County Coliseum
17	Saturday	June 19	7:05pm	Corpus Christi Hammerheads	W 72-32	7-7	Ector County Coliseum

=== Playoffs ===
Round	Day	Date	Kickoff	Opponent	Results		Location
Round	Day	Date	Kickoff	Opponent	Final score	Team record	Location
Wild Card	Saturday	June 26	7:05pm	at Amarillo Venom	L 36-56	---	Amarillo Civic Center

== Standings ==
2010 Lonestar West Division
	W	L	T	PCT	GB	DIV	PF	PA	STK
y-Amarillo Venom	11	3	0	0.786	---	4-0	702	509	L1
x-West Texas Roughnecks	7	7	0	0.500	4.0	3-2	594	655	W4
Abilene Ruff Riders	2	12	0	0.143	9.0	0-5	544	644	L4

== Roster ==
2010 West Texas Roughnecks roster
Quarterbacks: 10 Devin Campbell; 4 Tommy Jones; Running backs: 22 DeWayne Hogan; 17 Rashaud Slaughter; Wide receivers: 1 Steve Bergeski; 3 Ryan Bugg; 5 Nathaniel Dunn; 2 Josh Floyd; 14 Dexter Henderson	Offensive linemen: 56 Peter Fields; 79 Ken Shackleford; 62 Dustin Washburn; Defensive linemen: 95 Jermaine Blakely; 44 Ronnie Mason; 57 Jeerickus Speights; 55 James Vess	Linebackers: 9 Eric Henri; 43 Antonio Clay; Defensive backs: -- Darius Johnson; 8 Alex Otoo; 23 Antonio Sims; 6 Austin Smith; 12 Clarence Wright; Kickers: 19 Zeke Arevalo	Injured Reserve: currently vacant; Exempt List: currently vacant; Practice squad: currently vacant; rookies in italics Roster updated June 26, 2010; 23 Active, 0 Inactive, 0 PS → More rosters
