= 2010 Amarillo Venom season =

Indoor Football League team season

- Owner: Jay Morris; Dale Morris
- Head coach: Jon Lyles
- Home stadium: Amarillo Civic Center; 401 South Buchanan St. Amarillo, TX 79101

Results
- Record: 11-3
- Division place: 1st Lonestar West
- Playoffs: Won quarterfinals 56-36 (Roughnecks); Lost semifinals 31-46 (Diamonds)

The 2010 Amarillo Venom season was the team's seventh season as a professional indoor football franchise and first in the Indoor Football League (IFL). One of twenty-five teams competing in the IFL for the 2010 season, the Amarillo, Texas-based West Texas Roughnecks were members of the Lonestar West Division of the Intense Conference.

With the af2 breaking up and its larger market teams moving to Arena Football 1, the Dusters were forced to find a new league. Owner Randy Sanders applied for his team's spot in the Indoor Football League (IFL), and they were accepted as an expansion franchise.

The Venom lost to the Arkansas Diamonds 34–46 in the Intense Conference Semifinals.

== Schedule ==
Win Tie Loss Bye

=== Regular season ===
Week	Day	Date	Kickoff	Opponent	Results		Location	Attendance
Week	Day	Date	Kickoff	Opponent	Final score	Team record	Location	Attendance
1	Bye							NA
2	Bye							NA
3	Saturday	March 13	7:11pm	at West Texas Roughnecks	W 53–27	1-0	Ector County Coliseum	
4	Bye							NA
5	Saturday	March 27	7:05pm	West Texas Roughnecks	W 55–33	2-0	Amarillo Civic Center	2,559
6	Friday	April 2	7:05pm	at Austin Turfcats	W 71–20	3-0	Luedecke Arena	1,000
7	Saturday	April 10	7:05pm	Corpus Christi Hammerheads	W 51–40	4-0	Amarillo Civic Center	
8	Sunday	April 18	3:00pm	at Colorado Ice	W 56–37	5-0	Budweiser Events Center	
9	Saturday	April 24	7:05pm	Colorado Ice	W 47–41	6-0	Amarillo Civic Center	3,031
10	Saturday	May 1	7:05pm	Abilene Ruff Riders	W 58–50	7-0	Amarillo Civic Center	2,826
11	Saturday	May 8	7:05pm	at Corpus Christi Hammerheads	L 24–34	7-1	American Bank Center	
12	Sunday	May 15	7:05pm	San Angelo Stampede Express	W 66–41	8-1	Amarillo Civic Center	3,012
13	Saturday	May 22	7:05pm	Arkansas Diamonds	W 35–20	9-1	Amarillo Civic Center	3,137
14	Saturday	May 29	7:05pm	at Abilene Ruff Ridiers	W 56–22	10-1	Taylor County Expo Center	3,611
15	Friday	June 4	7:35pm	at Arkansas Diamonds	L 41–68	10-2	Verizon Arena	
16	Saturday	June 12	7:05pm	Austin Turfcats	W 39–16	11-2	Amarillo Civic Center	3,539
17	Saturday	June 19	7:05pm	at San Angelo Stampede Express	L 50–60	11-3	San Angelo Coliseum	

=== Playoffs ===
Round	Day	Date	Kickoff	Opponent	Results		Location	Attendance
Round	Day	Date	Kickoff	Opponent	Final score	Team record	Location	Attendance
Wild Card	Monday	June 28	7:05pm	West Texas Roughnecks	W 56-36	---	Amarillo Civic Center	3,616
IC Semifinals	Saturday	July 3	7:05pm	Arkansas Diamonds	W 31–46	---	Amarillo Civic Center	3,023

== Standings ==
2010 Lonestar West Division
	W	L	T	PCT	GB	DIV	PF	PA	STK
y-Amarillo Venom	11	3	0	0.786	---	4-0	702	509	L1
x-West Texas Roughnecks	7	7	0	0.500	4.0	3-2	594	655	W4
Abilene Ruff Riders	2	12	0	0.143	9.0	0-5	544	644	L4

== Roster ==
2010 Amarillo Venom roster
Quarterbacks: 13 Julian Reese; 7 Sean Setzer; Running backs: 22 DonTrell Moore; Wide receivers: 1 Anthony Clark; 8 Ricardo Lenhart; 3 Alex Watson; 21 Corey White	Offensive linemen: 50 Willie Barton; 55 Carlos Downey; 66 Jon Ioane; 77 Sione Ohuafi; 99 Marcus Rowe; Defensive linemen: 33 Barrett Allen; 85 Ray Gates; 95 Brandon Jenkins; 88 Mario Reese	Linebackers: 37 Tim Turner; 32 Kyle Wilson; Defensive backs: 12 Darrius Battles; 9 DonTa Bright; 15 Kevin Patterson; 23 Cashmin Thomas; Kickers: 10 Darren McCaleb	Injured Reserve: currently vacant; Exempt List: currently vacant; Practice squad: currently vacant; rookies in italics Roster updated June 26, 2010; 23 Active, 0 Inactive, 0 PS → More rosters
