= 2011 Albany Panthers season =

- Owner: Rod Chappell
- General manager: Will Carter
- Head coach: Lucious Davis
- Home stadium: James H. Gray Civic Center

Results
- Record: 10-2
- Playoffs: Won 1st Round (Erie) 68-43; Won Eastern Conference Championship (Columbus) 75-61; Won President's Cup III (Louisiana) 69-48

The 2011 Albany Panthers season was the second season as a professional indoor football franchise and their second in the Southern Indoor Football League (SIFL).

The team played their home games under head coach Lucious Davis at the James H. Gray Civic Center in Albany, Georgia.

The Panthers returned to the SIFL, which had expanded from just five teams to sixteen during the offseason, for their second season. Finishing 10-2, they clinched their second playoff berth and the #2 seed. They hosted the 9-3 Erie Explosion in the first round of the playoffs, winning 68-43 and earning their first playoff win and berth in the eastern conference championship against the Columbus Lions. They would go on to win that game as well, and coupled with a Louisiana upset over the undefeated Houston Stallions, would play in and host their first ever championship game. On July 1, 2011, they beat the Louisiana Swashbucklers 69-48, to win their first ever championship.

== Schedule ==
Key: Win Tie Loss Bye

=== Regular season ===
Opponent	Final score	Record
Louisiana Swashbucklers	W 30-27	1-0
at Carolina Speed	W 58-45	2-0
at Columbus Lions	W 46-26	3-0
at Lafayette Wildcatters	W Forfeit	4-0
at Alabama Hammers	W 47-26	5-0
at Fayetteville Force	W 43-40	6-0
Richmond Raiders	W 61-46	7-0
Columbus Lions	L 56-60	7-1
at Alabama Hammers	W 86-70	8-1
at Richmond Raiders	W 48-42	9-1
at Columbus Lions	L 58-39	9-2
Alabama Hammers	W 68-51	10-2

=== Postseason ===
Round	Playoffs	Final score
1st	Erie Explosion	W 68-43
Eastern Conference Championship	at Columbus Lions	W 75-61
President's Cup III	Louisiana Swashbucklers	W 69-48

== Roster ==
2011 Albany Panthers roster
Quarterbacks: currently vacant; Running backs: currently vacant; Wide receivers: currently vacant	Offensive linemen: currently vacant; Defensive linemen: Brodrick Johnson	Linebackers: currently vacant; Defensive backs: currently vacant; Kickers: currently vacant	Injured Reserve: currently vacant; Exempt List: currently vacant; Practice squad: currently vacant; rookies in italics Roster updated July 1, 2011; 0 Active, 0 Inactive, 0 PS → More rosters

== Division Standings ==
Team	Overall			Division		
Team	Wins	Losses	Percentage	Wins	Losses	Percentage
Eastern Conference
Northeast Division
Erie Explosion	9	3	0.750	5	3	0.625
Trenton Steel	8	4	0.667	6	2	0.750
Harrisburg Stampede	2	10	0.167	1	7	0.125
Mid-Atlantic Division
Richmond Raiders*	6	6	0.500	3	1	0.750
Carolina Speed	3	9	0.250	2	2	0.250
Fayetteville Force	3	9	0.250	1	3	0.250
South Division
Columbus Lions	11	1	0.917	5	1	0.833
Albany Panthers	9	2	0.818	4	2	0.667
Alabama Hammers	3	8	0.273	0	6	0.000
Western Conference
Gulf Division
Louisiana Swashbucklers	8	4	0.667	1	0	1.000
Mobile Bay Tarpons**	2	3	0.500	0	1	0.000
Lafayette Wildcatters***	0	12	0.000	0	12	0.000
Southwest Division
Houston Stallions	12	0	1.000	8	0	1.000
Corpus Christi Hammerheads	7	5	0.583	3	4	0.429
Rio Grande Valley Magic	6	6	0.500	3	6	0.333
Abilene Ruff Riders	4	8	0.333	1	6	0.143

- Green indicates clinched playoff berth
- Purple indicates division champion
- Grey indicates best league record
- * = Failed to make the playoffs despite winning division
- ** = Folded five games into their season.
- *** = Suspended operations prior to the season due to lack of Worker's Compensation Insurance

Preceded by 2010	Albany Panthers seasons 2011	Succeeded by 2012
