= 2010 Corpus Christi Hammerheads season =

Indoor Football League team season

- Owner: Chad Dittman
- Head coach: Stephen Fillmore
- Home stadium: American Bank Center; 1901 North Shoreline; Corpus Christi, Texas 78401

Results
- Record: 6-8
- Division place: 3rd Lonestar East
- Playoffs: Lost IC quarterfinals 29-44 (Diamonds)

The 2010 Corpus Christi Hammerheads season was the team's seventh season as a professional indoor football franchise and second in the Indoor Football League (IFL). One of twenty-five teams competing in the IFL for the 2010 season, the Corpus Christi, Texas-based Corpus Christi Hammerheads were members of the Lonestar East Division of the Intense Conference.

Under the leadership of head coach Stephen Fillmore, the team played their home games at the American Bank Center in Corpus Christi, Texas.

The Hammerheads lost to the Arkansas Diamonds 29–44 in the Intense Conference quarterfinals.

== Schedule ==
Win Tie Loss Bye

=== Regular season ===
Week	Day	Date	Kickoff	Opponent	Results		Location
Week	Day	Date	Kickoff	Opponent	Final score	Team record	Location
1	Saturday	February 28	4:05pm	Arkansas Diamonds	L 18–26	0-1	American Bank Center
2	Bye						
3	Sunday	March 14	4:05pm	Austin Turfcats	W 51–36	1-1	American Bank Center
4	Sunday	March 21	4:05pm	West Texas Roughnecks	W 47–35	2-1	American Bank Center
5	Saturday	March 27	7:05pm	at San Angelo Stampede Express	L 31–45	2-2	San Angelo Coliseum
6	Saturday	April 3	7:05pm	at Arkansas Diamonds	L 21–35	2-3	Verizon Arena
7	Saturday	April 10	7:05pm	at Amarillo Venom	L 40–51	2-4	Amarillo Civic Center
8	Saturday	April 17	7:05pm	at Abilene Ruff Riders	L 31–48	2-5	Taylor County Expo Center
9	Saturday	April 24	6:30pm	at Austin Turfcats	W 32–30	3-5	Luedecke Arena
10	Bye						
11	Saturday	May 8	7:05pm	Amarillo Venom	W 34–24	4-5	American Bank Center
12	Bye						
13	Sunday	May 23	4:05pm	Austin Turfcats	W 27–13	5-5	American Bank Center
14	Saturday	May 29	7:15pm	at West Texas Roughnecks	L 38–50	5-6	Ector County Coliseum
15	Sunday	June 6	4:05pm	Abilene Ruff Riders	W 49–46	6-6	American Bank Center
16	Saturday	June 12	7:05pm	San Angelo Stampede Express	L 50–53	6-7	American Bank Center
17	Saturday	June 19	7:05pm	at West Texas Roughnecks	L 32–72	6-8	Ector County Coliseum

=== Playoffs ===
Round	Day	Date	Kickoff	Opponent	Results		Location
Round	Day	Date	Kickoff	Opponent	Final score	Team record	Location
Wild Card	Saturday	June 26	7:05pm	at Arkansas Diamonds	L 29–44	---	Verizon Arena

== Standings ==
2010 Lonestar East Division
	W	L	T	PCT	GB	DIV	PF	PA	STK
y-Arkansas Diamonds	11	3	0	0.786	—	6–1	533	423	W3
x-San Angelo Stampede Express	10	4	0	0.714	1.0	4–2	603	521	W3
x-Corpus Christi Hammerheads	6	8	0	0.429	5.0	3–4	501	567	L2
Austin Turfcats	2	12	0	0.143	8.0	1–7	428	606	L10

== Roster ==
2010 Corpus Christi Hammerheads roster
Quarterbacks: 5 David Bowie; 11 Wesley Cooper; 10 Jarrett Neu; Running backs: 3 Redford Borel; Wide receivers: 9 Corey Brittian; 2 Julius Eppinger; 22 Justin Hardman; 7 Brian Murph	Offensive linemen: 66 Willie Hardaway; 50 Joe Lister; 99 LaDaniel Marshall; 72 Kameron Young; 71 Jerod Fields; Defensive linemen: 4 Joshua Ane; 56 Marvin James; 95 Wilbert Martin; 6 Joe Small; 55 Myqual Spann; 34 Fred Wallace	Linebackers: 8 DeAndre Fillmore; Defensive backs: 1 Rueben Flowers; 21 Henry Hall; 24 Jason Lee; 4 Maurice Wiggins; Kickers: 12 Stephen Moreno	Injured Reserve: currently vacant; Exempt List: currently vacant; Practice squad: currently vacant; rookies in italics Roster updated June 26, 2010; 23 Active, 0 Inactive, 0 PS → More rosters
