= 2010 San Angelo Stampede Express season =

Indoor Football League team season

- Owner: Darlene Jones
- Head coach: Clint Dolezel
- Home stadium: San Angelo Coliseum; 50 E 43rd St. San Angelo, Texas 76903

Results
- Record: 10-4
- Division place: 2nd Lonestar East
- Playoffs: Won IC Wild Card 45-35 (Grizzlies); Lost IC quarterfinals 38-68 (Diamonds)

The 2010 San Angelo Stampede Express season was the team's seventh season as a professional indoor football franchise and second in the Indoor Football League (IFL). One of twenty-five teams that competed in the IFL for the 2010 season, the San Angelo, Texas-based San Angelo Stampede Express were members of the Lonestar East Division of the Intense Conference.

Under the leadership of head coach Clint Dolezel, the team played their home games at the Foster Communications Coliseum in San Angelo, Texas.

The Stampede Express lost to the Billings Outlaws 38-68 in the Intense Conference quarterfinals.

== Schedule ==
Win Tie Loss Bye

=== Regular season ===
Week	Day	Date	Kickoff	Opponent	Results		Location
Week	Day	Date	Kickoff	Opponent	Final score	Team record	Location
1	Bye						
2	Bye						
3	Friday	March 12	7:35pm	at Arkansas Diamonds	L 26-33	0-1	Verizon Arena
4	Saturday	March 20	7:00pm	at Abilene Ruff Riders	W 38-27	1-1	Taylor County Expo Center
5	Saturday	March 27	7:00pm	Corpus Christi Hammerheads	W 45-31	2-1	San Angelo Coliseum
6	Saturday	April 3	7:05pm	Abilene Ruff Riders	W 39-37	3-1	San Angelo Coliseum
7	Saturday	April 10	7:05pm	West Texas Roughnecks	W 44-35	4-1	San Angelo Coliseum
8	Saturday	April 17	7:05pm	Arkansas Diamonds	L 10-23	4-2	San Angelo Coliseum
9	Saturday	April 24	7:15pm	at West Texas Roughnecks	W 60-27	5-2	Ector County Coliseum
10	Saturday	May 1	6:30pm	at Austin Turfcats	W 52-27	6-2	Luedecke Arena
11	Saturday	May 8	7:05pm	Abilene Ruff Riders	W 46-37	7-2	San Angelo Coliseum
12	Saturday	May 15	7:05pm	at Amarillo Venom	L 41-66	7-3	Amarillo Civic Center
13	Saturday	May 22	3:45pm	at Wichita Wild	L 35-42	7-4	Hartman Arena
14	Bye						
15	Saturday	June 5	7:05pm	Austin Turfcats	W 54-36	8-4	San Angelo Coliseum
16	Saturday	June 12	7:05pm	at Corpus Christi Hammerheads	W 53-50	9-4	American Bank Center
17	Saturday	June 19	7:05pm	Amarillo Venom	W 60-50	10-4	San Angelo Coliseum

=== Playoffs ===
Round	Day	Date	Kickoff	Opponent	Results		Location
Round	Day	Date	Kickoff	Opponent	Final score	Team record	Location
Wild Card	Monday	June 28	7:05pm	Fairbanks Grizzlies	W 45-35	---	San Angelo Coliseum
IC Quarterfinals	Saturday	July 3	2:00pm	at Billings Outlaws	L 39-68	---	Rimrock Auto Arena at MetraPark

== Standings ==
2010 Lonestar East Division
	W	L	T	PCT	GB	DIV	PF	PA	STK
y-Arkansas Diamonds	11	3	0	0.786	—	6–1	533	423	W3
x-San Angelo Stampede Express	10	4	0	0.714	1.0	4–2	603	521	W3
x-Corpus Christi Hammerheads	6	8	0	0.429	5.0	3–4	501	567	L2
Austin Turfcats	2	12	0	0.143	8.0	1–7	428	606	L10

== Roster ==
2010 San Angelo Stampede Express roster
Quarterbacks: 5 Dustin Almond; 16 Chad Draper; Running bcks: 10 Derrick Ross; Wide receivers: 14 Ashlan Davis; 8 Johnathan Ferguson; 1 TyJuan Manning; 2 Chris McKinney; 82 James Panui	Offensive linemen: 76 Devin Livingston; 75 Matt Raesner; 55 John Sekona; Defensive linemen: 91 Chandler Blakely; 47 Calvin France; 90 Greg Moore; 4 Jeramie Richardson; 22 Jonathan Williams	Linebackers: 13 Joe Goosby; 17 Jeremiah Turner; Defensive backs: 3 Jeffery Hodges; 11 Joey Longoria; 21 Joe McClendon; 7 Keon Perry; Kickers: 15 Darren Brown	Injured reserve: Currently vacant; Exempt list: Currently vacant; Practice squad: Currently vacant; Rookies in italics Roster updated June 19, 2010; 23 Active, 0 Inactive, 0 PS
