= Austin Turfcats =

Professional indoor football team

Logo

General information
- Founded: 2008
- Folded: 2010
- Headquartered: Luedecke Arena in Austin, Texas
- Colors: Armadillo gold, recycling green, natural white

Personnel
- Owner: Jack Dixon
- General manager: Joe Martinez
- Head coach: Chris Duliban

Team history
- Austin Turfcats (2009–2010)

Home fields
- Luedecke Arena (2009–2010)

League / conference affiliations
- Southern Indoor Football League (2009); Indoor Football League (2010); Intense Conference (2010); Lonestar East Division (2010)

Playoff appearances (1)
- 2009

The Austin Turfcats were a professional indoor football team based in Austin, Texas. The Turfcats were a member of the Indoor Football League (IFL) during the 2010 season, after being a charter member of the Southern Indoor Football League (SIFL) during their inaugural 2009 season. The Turfcats played their home games at Luedecke Arena at the Travis County Exposition Center. This was Austin's fourth attempt at an indoor football team; the prior three were the Indoor Professional Football League's Texas Terminators (1999), the National Indoor Football League's Austin Knights/Rockers (2002–2003), and the Arena Football League (later af2's) Austin Wranglers (2004–2008) (the former two of which played in Luedecke Arena before the Turfcats).

== History ==
=== Launch: 2009 ===
On November 24, 2008, it was announced that the city of Austin, Texas, had been awarded an expansion franchise for the 2009 startup Southern Indoor Football League (SIFL). On November 25, 2008, it was announced that the team's nickname would be the Turfcats and that they would play their home games at Luedecke Arena at the Travis County Expo Center. Chris Duliban was the team's head coach after previously serving as the defensive coordinator of the Indoor Professional Football League's Texas Terminators and then as the head coach for the CenTex Barracudas of the Intense Football League in 2008. The Turfcats lost their first game 29–37 to the Acadiana Mudbugs. The following week the Turfcats won their first game 34–32 over the Houma Conquerors.

=== Joining the IFL: 2010 ===
In October 2009, the Turfcats were accepted into the Indoor Football League (IFL) for the 2010 season. They went 2–12 under head coach Duliban and folded after the season.

== Season-by-season results ==
League champions	Conference champions	Division champions	Playoff berth	League leader

Season	League	Conference	Division	Regular season				Postseason results
Season	League	Conference	Division	Finish	Wins	Losses	Ties	Postseason results
2009	SIFL			2nd	10	3		Won SIFL Semifinal (Acadiana); Lost President's Cup I (Louisiana)
2010	IFL	Intense	Lonestar East	4th	2	12		Did not qualify
Totals					12	15		All-time regular season record (2009–2010)
Totals					1	1	—	All-time postseason record (2009–2010)
Totals					13	16		All-time regular season and postseason record (2009–2010)

== Personnel ==
=== Head coaches ===
Name	Term	Regular season				Playoffs		Awards
Name	Term	W	L	T	Win%	W	L	Awards
Chris Duliban	2009–2010	12	15	0	.444	1	1	

=== Front office staff ===
- Joe Martinez – general manager – IFL
- Ronald Oswalt – general manager – SIFL/IFL
- Jack Dixon – director of operations – SIFL/IFL

== 2010 season ==
2010 Austin Turfcats season
- Owner: Jack Dixon
- General manager: Joe Martinez
- Head coach: Chris Duliban
- Home stadium: Luedecke Arena; 7311 Decker Lane; Austin, Texas 78724

Results
- Record: 2–12
- Division place: 4th Lonestar East
- Playoffs: Did not qualify

=== Schedule ===
Win Tie Loss Bye

Week	Date	Opponent	Results		Location
Week	Date	Opponent	Score	Record	Location
1	Bye				
2	Bye				
3	March 14	at Corpus Christi Hammerheads	L 36–51	0–1	American Bank Center
4	March 20	at Arkansas Diamonds	W 31–29	1–1	Verizon Arena
5	Bye				
6	April 2	Amarillo Venom	L 20–71	1–2	Luedecke Arena
7	April 10	Abilene Ruff Riders	W 68–34	2–2	Luedecke Arena
8	April 17	at West Texas Roughnecks	L 46–49	2–3	Ector County Coliseum
9	April 24	Corpus Christi Hammerheads	L 30–32	2–4	Luedecke Arena
10	May 1	San Angelo Stampede Express	L 27–52	2–5	Luedecke Arena
11	May 8	West Texas Roughnecks	L 29–46	2–6	Luedecke Arena
12	May 15	at Abilene Ruff Riders	L 20–47	2–7	Taylor County Expo Center
13	May 23	at Corpus Christi Hammerheads	L 13–27	2–8	American Bank Center
14	May 29	Arkansas Diamonds	L 16–21	2–9	Luedecke Arena
15	June 5	at San Angelo Stampede Express	L 36–54	2–10	San Angelo Coliseum
16	June 12	at Amarillo Venom	L 16–39	2–11	Amarillo Civic Center
17	June 19	Arkansas Diamonds	L 40–54	2–12	Luedecke Arena

=== Standings ===
2010 Lonestar East Division
	W	L	T	PCT	GB	DIV	PF	PA	STK
y-Arkansas Diamonds	11	3	0	0.786	—	6–1	533	423	W3
x-San Angelo Stampede Express	10	4	0	0.714	1.0	4–2	603	521	W3
x-Corpus Christi Hammerheads	6	8	0	0.429	5.0	3–4	501	567	L2
Austin Turfcats	2	12	0	0.143	8.0	1–7	428	606	L10
