= Kahlil Carter =

American gridiron football player and coach (born 1976)

Profile
- Positions: Defensive back, linebacker

Personal information
- Born: September 13, 1976 (age 50); Washington, D.C., U.S.
- Listed height: 6 ft 1 in (1.85 m)
- Listed weight: 210 lb (95 kg)

Career information
- High school: Little Rock Central
- College: Southern Arkansas, Arkansas
- NFL draft: 2000: undrafted

Career history

Playing
- Arkansas Twisters (2000); Milwaukee Mustangs (2001); Toronto Phantoms (2002); Tampa Bay Storm (2003)*; Arkansas Twisters (2003); Cleveland Browns (2003)*; Buffalo Bills (2004)*; Scottish Claymores (2004); Nashville Kats (2005); Toronto Argonauts (2005); Nashville Kats (2006); Orlando Predators (2006); Toronto Argonauts (2006–2007); Kansas City Brigade (2008)*; Toronto Argonauts (2008)*; Orlando Predators (2008)*; Montreal Alouettes (2008); Iowa Barnstormers (2010)
- * Offseason or practice squad member only

Coaching
- Arkansas Twisters Pass game and special teams coordinator/secondary coach (2007)*; Graceland Volunteer assistant/secondary coach (2010); Trenton Steel Defensive coordinator (2011); West Des Moines (IA) Valley H.S. Cornerbacks coach (2011, 2014, 2019–2020).; Drake Cornerbacks coach (2012–2013); Saskatchewan Roughriders Guest coach (2014); FXFL Blacktips Pass game and special teams coordinator/director of football operations (2014); Calgary Stampeders Pass game/secondary coach (2015–2017); Montreal Alouettes Defensive coordinator/director of regional scouting (2018); Cologne Centurions Head coach/defensive coordinator (2023)*

Awards and highlights
- First team All-af2 (2003); AF2 Defensive Player of the Year (2003); Second Team All-Arena (2005); ALL-AF2 Anniversary Team (2007); #2 all-time defensive back as a defensive specialist in af2; Arkansas Twisters #9 retired (af2)

Career CFL statistics
- Total tackles: 75
- Interceptions: 10
- Defensive touchdowns: 4
- Stats at CFL.ca (archived)

Career AFL statistics
- Total tackles: 345
- Interceptions: 39
- Receptions: 60
- Receiving yards: 690
- Total touchdowns: 23

Kahlil Rafiq Carter (born September 13, 1976) is an American former professional gridiron football player and coach.

Carter has been a professional gridiron football player in the Arena Football League (AFL), NFL Europe, and the Canadian Football League (CFL). His last season of professional football was spent playing defensive back in the AFL for the Iowa Barnstormers in 2010. Carter has also spent time in NFL Europe with the Scottish Claymores. Carter also was a defensive back in the CFL with the Toronto Argonauts and the Montreal Alouettes.

Carter has also coached in the CFL for the Calgary Stampeders from 2015-2017 as their defensive backs coach, and served as a scout for the Montreal Alouettes in 2018.

== College football ==
From 1994 to 1997, Carter walked-on to the University of Arkansas' football team. He began his university career as a quarterback before making the transition to wide receiver. In 1998, Carter transferred to Southern Arkansas University where he led the Muleriders in special teams tackles.

== Professional football career ==
=== Arena Football ===
In 2000, Carter signed with the Arkansas Twisters of af2. He rotated between QB, WR, DB, LB and became the first player in team history to be signed to a professional contract (AFL). Completed 16–25 passes for 201 yards and 6 touchdowns while catching 10 passes for 165 yards and 5 touchdowns. Also recorded 25 tackles 2 ints, and 11 pbu's.

In 2001, Carter was signed by the Milwaukee Mustangs of the Arena Football League (AFL). He went on to play all 14 regular season games with the team recording 35 catches for 364 yards and 6 touchdowns to go along with 24 tackles, two knockdowns, two interceptions, two fumble recoveries and one forced fumble on defense. Carter also saw time at QB and completed four of four passes and two touchdowns. Named teams rookie of the year and a reserve on the AFL all-Rookie team.

In 2002, Carter was acquired by the Toronto Phantoms (AFL) in the 2002 dispersal draft, & recorded 17 total tackles, 1 fumble recovery, and two knockdowns, catching 10 passes for 119 yards and one touchdown that season.

In 2003, Carter attended training camp with the Tampa Bay Storm (AFL), but ultimately returned to the Arkansas Twisters (af2) and set an af2 league record with 14 interceptions in 14 games (16 interceptions in 17 games including playoffs) and was named af2 Defensive Player of the Year.

In 2004, Carter signed with the Orlando Predators of the AFL to complement all-time great Kenny McEntyre.

In 2005, Carter was acquired by Nashville Katz (AFL) in 2005 dispersement draft and would go on to record 70 tackles, 7 INT (second most in the AFL) and one forced fumble with Nashville. He was also named Second-Team All-Arena at corner and safety.

In 2006, Carter was a pre-season all-arena selection for the Katz & was also named AFL Defensive Player of the Week on February 28 after posting 11 tackles, 2 pass break-ups and an interception in a Katz victory. Carter was later acquired by the Orlando Predators (AFL) who would go on to advance to ArenaBowl XX. During the playoff drive, Carter was also named Defensive Player of the Week in Conference Championship vs Dallas for recording 2 INT, one for a TD. The Predators would go on to lose ArenaBowl XX 69-61, but Carter would record the longest touchdown run in ArenaBowl history (36 yards).

In 2007, Carter was named to the af2 anniversary team and voted the #2 defensive specialist in af2 history. Carter also had his #9 jersey retired by the Arkansas Twisters of the af2.

In 2008, Carter attended training camp with the Kansas City Brigade (AFL) after being traded from the Orlando Predators (AFL) in exchange for DB Kenny McEntyre. He played in two preseason games and recorded interceptions in both before sustaining a season ending shoulder injury.

In 2010, Carter served as player/coach and team captain for the Iowa Barnstormers of the new AFL. At age 34, Carter was one of only 3 players with AFL experience on a very young Barnstormer team. Khalil appeared in all 16 games and finished with 85 tackles, 5 interceptions, 3 fumble recoveries, and 17 pass breakups. After the season, Carter announced his retirement as a player and was hired to coach the secondary at Graceland University in southern Iowa.

=== Canadian football ===
In 2005, Carter joined the Toronto Argonauts of the Canadian Football League (CFL). In his rookie season, he played in 1 game & recorded 3 tackles.

In 2006, Carter re-joined the Argonauts in week 2 after playing in ArenaBowl XX for the Arena Football League championship. He would go on to play in 12 games, starting seven at DB and CB, also saw time at LB and on ST. He would go on to establish career highs in defensive tackles, interceptions and interception return yards that season & moed into a third place tie with LB Don Wilson on the Argos’ all-time single season interception yards list with 184. Carter also placed tied for 3rd all-time on Argo's consecutive games with an interception list with 3. Week 7, recorded his first-ever CFL interception (03/08/06) and returned it 84-yards for a TD.

In 2007, Carter dressed for all 18 regular season games rotating in the Toronto Argonauts' secondary, starting 6 at DB and CB, finishing the season with 3 interceptions and two defensive touchdowns. He was named player of the week on Sept 13 for a 7 tackle performance which included an 82-yard interception return for a touchdown against Hamilton.

In 2008, Carter entered training camp with the Toronto Argonauts replacing Jordan Younger at boundary corner recording 3 tackles, 1 pass break up and 1 interception in the preseason game versus Montreal. Carter was released by the Argonauts after training camp & signed with the Montreal Alouettes in July. In four regular season games, Carter recorded 7 tackles, 2 interceptions & 1 defensive touchdown (50 yds.) and 5 pass break ups. In the East Final versus Edmonton, Carter recorded 5 tackles & 4 pass break ups. In the 96th Grey Cup, Carter recorded a game high 8 tackles which was the 3rd most tackles in a game in Grey Cup history.

=== American football ===
in 2004, Carter was signed by the Buffalo Bills of the NFL and allocated to the Scottish Claymores of NFL Europe, leading the team in special team tackles. He recorded 28 tackles, 3 pass breakups, 2 force fumbles and 1 blocked field goal while captaining one of the stingiest secondaries in NFL Europe history. Carter went on to attend training camp with the Buffalo Bills before sustaining a season ending sports hernia.

== Coaching career ==
=== Arena Football ===
Carter began his coaching career as a player/coach in 2007 as Pass Game and Special Teams Coordinator for the Arkansas Twisters of the af2 while still an active player in the Canadian Football League (CFL).

In 2010, he also served as a player/coach with the Iowa Barnstormers of the Arena Football League (AFL). As a defensive back and team captain, Carter assisted with their weekly game-plan preparation and their player personnel. Coach Carter captained the Barnstormers 3rd ranked scoring defense also finishing 1st against the run. For the second season under coach Carter's watch, one of his players (Tanner Varner) broke the league tackling record with 146 tackles. Under Carter's watch Jason Simpson also broke the AF2 record in 2007 for the Arkansas Twisters with 145. Both were rookies and recorded at least 8 interceptions as well.

In the spring of 2011, Carter served as defensive coordinator for the Trenton Steel of the Southern Indoor Football League.

=== College football ===
In 2010, Carter took his first collegiate coaching position as a volunteer assistant and Secondary and coach at Graceland University for the Graceland Yellowjackets of the Heart of America Athletic Conference.

In July 2012, Carter was named the cornerbacks coach for the NCAA Division I Drake Bulldogs football team. In his first season on the staff, he helped coach a pass defense that ranked second in the Pioneer Football League by allowing just 185 passing yards per game. That year Drake won a share of the Pioneer Football League Conference Championship.

In 2013, Carter helped coach Drake to the #1 ranked defense in the Pioneer Football League, producing a 2nd team All Conference Corner in Brad Duwe under his tutelage.

In 2025, Carter returned to college coaching serving as the Special Teams Coordinator for Texas College. The team struggled with poor funding and lesdership. Carter resigned at the end of the season.

=== Canadian football ===
In 2014, Carter served as a guest coach for the Grey Cup champion, Saskatchewan Roughriders.

From 2015 to 2017, Carter was named as the defensive backs coach for the Calgary Stampeders of the Canadian Football League. Calgary finished with the #1 scoring défense and pass defense all 3 seasons reaching back to back Grey Cups in 2016 and 2017.

On January 3, 2018, Carter was named the defensive coordinator for the Montreal Alouettes of the Canadian Football League, but on May 18, 2018, Carter resigned from the position for personal reasons, and was reassigned as a team scout.

=== FXFL ===
In 2014, Carter signed on to coach the secondary for the FXFL Blacktips of the newly formed FXFL which later became The Spring League.

=== High school football ===
In 2011, Carter coached cornerbacks at Valley High School in West Des Moines during its 2011 state 4A championship season.

In 2014, Carter rejoined West Des Moines Valley High School, upset #1 ranked Dowling Catholic, and finished #1 in the state.

Carter coached for Valley High School again in 2019 and 2020 reaching another State championship in 2019 with a perfect 13-0 record. The 2020 season was cut short due to COVID in the semi-finals of the playoffs.

Later in the fall of 2021, Coach SWAAG signed on to be the Defensive Coordinator of Waukee High School. Coaching a young team that was decimated by the splitting of two high schools. Only one player from the team had ever played in a varsity game in high school. Carter helped send two defensive players to Division one schools despite a disappointing 2-7 season.

=== European League of Football ===
On October 11, 2022, Carter was named as the head coach and defensive coordinator of the Cologne Centurions of the European League of Football. On March 17, 2023, Carter and the Centurions parted ways.

Other Pro Football

In the spring of 2021, Carter helped develop and coach the newly invented Fan Controlled Football League. Carter served as Defensive Coordinator for all 4 teams switching from team to team every series. Carters defenses help the opposing offenses to just under 29 points per game winning a championship with the Wild Aces.

In 2024, Coach Carter would be hired as the Head Coach for Arkansas Team of the start up Major League . The league folded operations before the season began.

Im 2026, Carter was hired as Defensive Coordinators for the Utah Great 8’s of the newly formed Internatinal Football League. Carter resigned shortly after training camp due to poor league operations and funding. The team would go on to win the inaugural championship with an impressive defense Carter handpicked and coached through training camp.

== Personal life ==
Though born in Washington, D.C., Carter was raised in Little Rock, Arkansas, where he graduated from Little Rock Central High School. He graduated in 2000 from the University of Arkansas with a B.A. in Psychology and a minor in French. In August 2014, Carter graduated with Pi Alpha Alpha honors receiving a Master of Public Administration from Drake University in Des Moines, Iowa. Carter is one of the founding members of the ABH chapter of the Phi Beta Sigma fraternity, and has over 10 years experience in youth counseling and mentoring. Carter is married to his wife Courtney, and has 4 daughters, Briana, Brooklyn, Mya, and Belize.
