= Derik Steiner =

American football player (born 1987)

No. 45
- Position: Fullback/Defensive linemen

Personal information
- Born: February 23, 1987 (age 39); Franklin, Ohio, U.S.
- Listed height: 6 ft 1 in (1.85 m)
- Listed weight: 325 lb (147 kg)

Career information
- High school: Franklin (OH) Bishop Fenwick
- College: Morehead State
- NFL draft: 2010: undrafted

Career history
- Green Bay Blizzard (2010); Trenton Steel (2011); Cleveland Gladiators (2012–2013); San Jose SaberCats (2014)*; Iowa Barnstormers (2014)
- * Offseason or practice squad member only

Awards and highlights
- 2nd Team All-Pioneer Football League (2007); 2× 1st Team All-Pioneer League (2008 & 2009)

Career AFL statistics
- Rushing attempts: 125
- Rushing Yards: 454
- Rushing TDs: 21
- Receiving Yards: 236
- Receiving TDs: 3
- Stats at ArenaFan.com

Derik Steiner (born February 23, 1987) is an American former professional football fullback. He played college football at Morehead State. He was signed as an undrafted free agent by the Green Bay Blizzard of the IFL in 2010. He was later signed by the Trenton Steel of the Southern Indoor Football League (SIFL) in 2011. After the Steel, Steiner was assigned to the Cleveland Gladiators of the AFL where he played for two seasons. He was traded to the San Jose SaberCats on January 3, 2014 from the Cleveland Gladiators. He was reassigned by the SaberCats on April 4, 2014 and claimed by the Iowa Barnstormers on April 5, 2014.
