= Houma Terrebonne Civic Center =

Arena in Louisiana, United States

Coordinates: 29.580143°N 90.725094°W

The Barry P. Bonvillain Civic Center, formerly known as the Houma-Terrebonne Civic Center, is a 5,000-seat multi-purpose arena in Houma, Louisiana, USA, that hosts corporate functions, such as meetings, training seminars, conferences, as well as formal banquets, wedding receptions, group conventions, consumer shows, professional wrestling, family theater and other performing arts, concerts, graduations, religious services, indoor and outdoor festivals.

It is also home to the annual Ducks Unlimited banquet in Terrebonne Parish. It opened on January 6, 1999.

The 100,000-square-foot (9,300 m^{2}) Civic Center is a multi-purpose building with a 5,000-seat arena, a theatrical / banquet area with a 2,500 person capacity, and a 10,000-square-foot (930 m^{2}) meeting room area. The facility was built at a cost of $18.1 million. There are 3,200 retractable seats at the arena.

It was home to the Houma Bayou Bucks of the National Indoor Football League from 2002 to 2004, and the Houma Conquerors of the Southern Indoor Football League in 2009.

== See also ==
- List of convention centers in the United States
- List of music venues
