= Bon Secours Wellness Arena =

Arena in Greenville, South Carolina, United States

- The Well

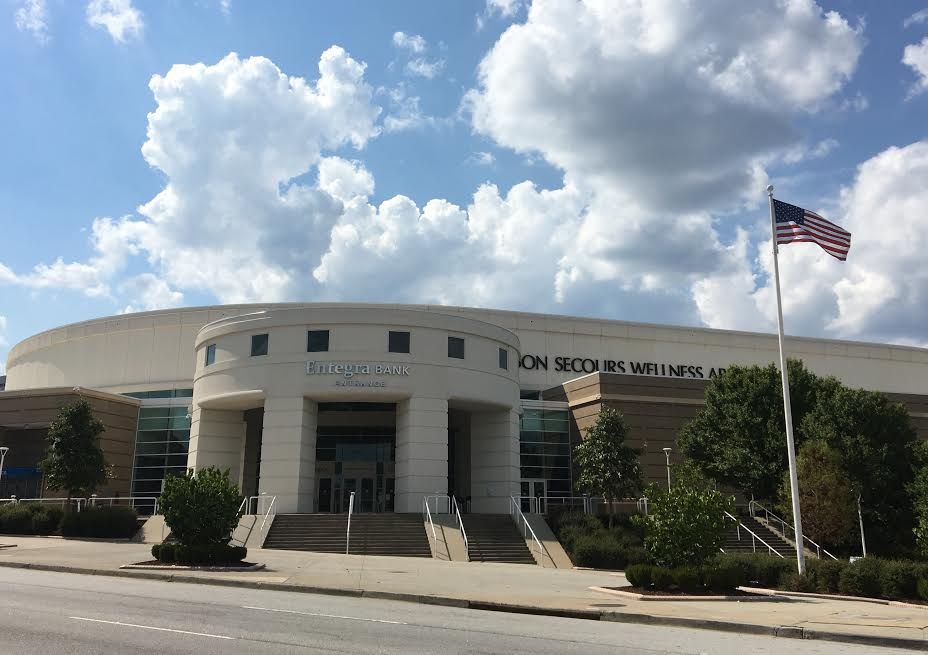
- Bon Secours Wellness Arena in 2016

- Location within South Carolina Location within the United States
- Former names: BI-LO Center (1998–2013)
- Address: 650 North Academy Street
- Location: Greenville, South Carolina, U.S.
- Coordinates: 34.852789°N 82.391458°W
- Owner: Greenville Arena District
- Operator: Greenville Arena District
- Capacity: Hockey: 13,951; Basketball: 15,000; Concert (Center Stage): 16,000; Concert (End Stage): 14,500

Construction
- Groundbreaking: March 7, 1996
- Opened: September 3, 1998
- Cost: $63 million (121 Million in 2024)
- Architects: Odell Associates; AMI Associates
- Project managers: International Facilities Group, LLC.
- Structural engineer: Geiger Engineers PC
- General contractor: Fluor Daniel

Tenants
- Greenville Grrrowl (ECHL) (1998–2006); Carolina Rhinos (AF2) (2000–2002); Greenville Groove (NBDL) (2001–2003); South Carolina/Greenville Force (AIFA/SIFL) (2009–2010); Greenville Swamp Rabbits (ECHL) (2010–present)

Website
- bonsecoursarena.com

Bon Secours Wellness Arena (formerly the BI-LO Center; a.k.a. The Well) is a multi-purpose arena in Greenville, South Carolina, United States. The arena serves as the home of the Greenville Swamp Rabbits of the ECHL.

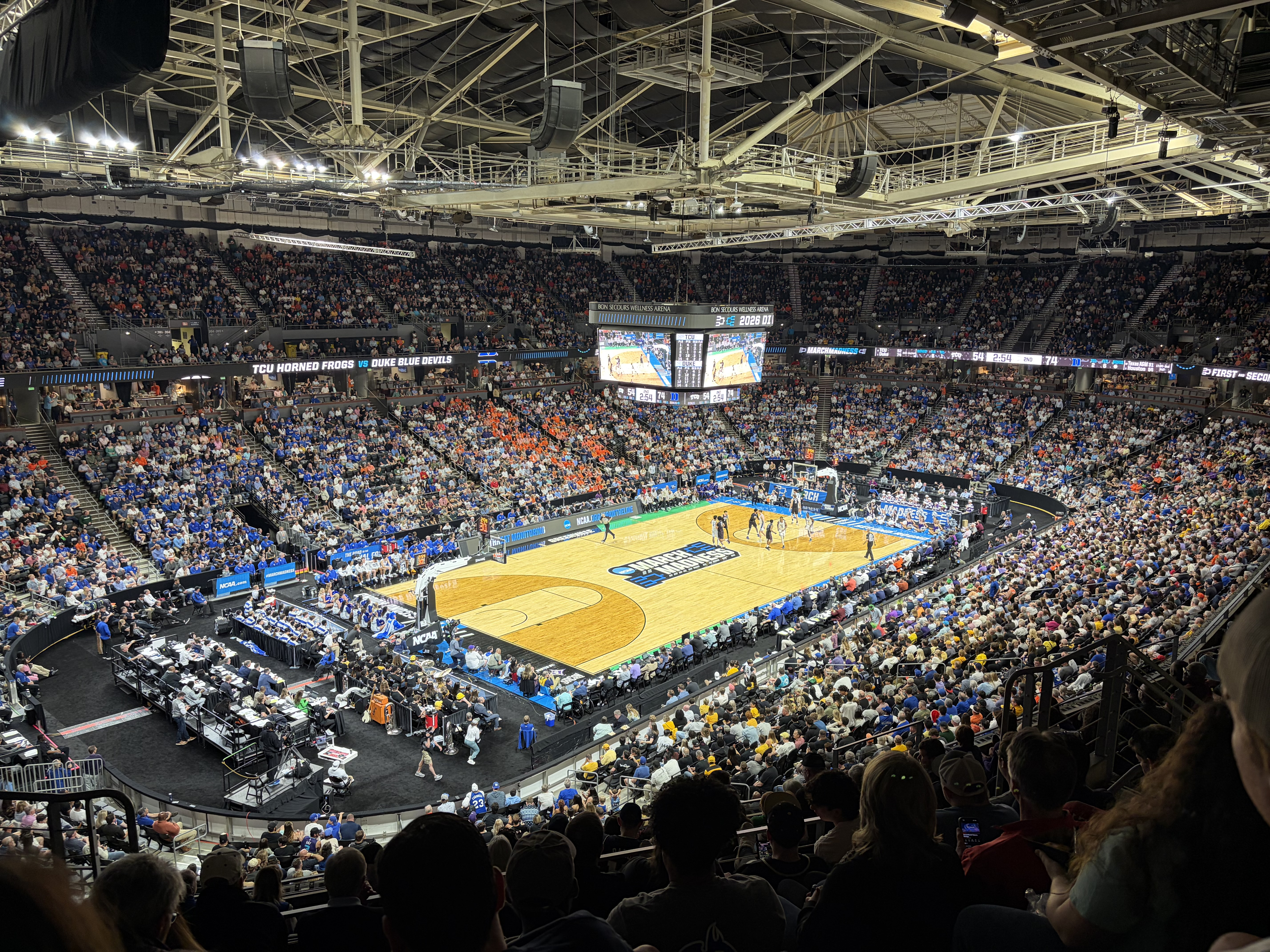
Bon Secours Wellness Arena hosting the 2026 NCAA Division I men's basketball tournament

== History ==
The arena opened as the BI-LO Center in 1998, and cost US $63 million. It replaced Greenville's outdated and under-repaired Greenville Memorial Auditorium, which was located across the street from the new arena and had been imploded on September 20, 1997. The arena naming rights were purchased by Dutch grocer Ahold, then-owner of BI-LO, which had been founded in nearby Mauldin and was still based there at the time. When it was built, it passed Columbia's Carolina Coliseum as the largest arena in the state of South Carolina, a distinction it held until 2002, when Colonial Life Arena was built in Columbia.

On September 18, 2013, the BI-LO Center was officially renamed the Bon Secours Wellness Arena after the Bon Secours Health System purchased the naming rights.

Bon Secours Wellness Arena was one of two regional hosts during the 2023 NCAA Division I women's basketball tournament, alongside Climate Pledge Arena in Seattle. This was the first season the NCAA had two regional brackets in each city, instead of the traditional set-up of four cities, one for each regional bracket.

=== Seating capacity ===
As a concert venue, the Bon Secours Wellness Arena can seat approximately 15,000 spectators, depending on the positioning of the stage. In addition, the arena features 30 luxury suites and 840 club seats.

Preceded by TNA Impact! Zone	Host of Against All Odds; 2008	Succeeded by TNA Impact! Zone
