= Mitchell Center =

Multi-purpose arena in Mobile, Alabama

- The Jungle
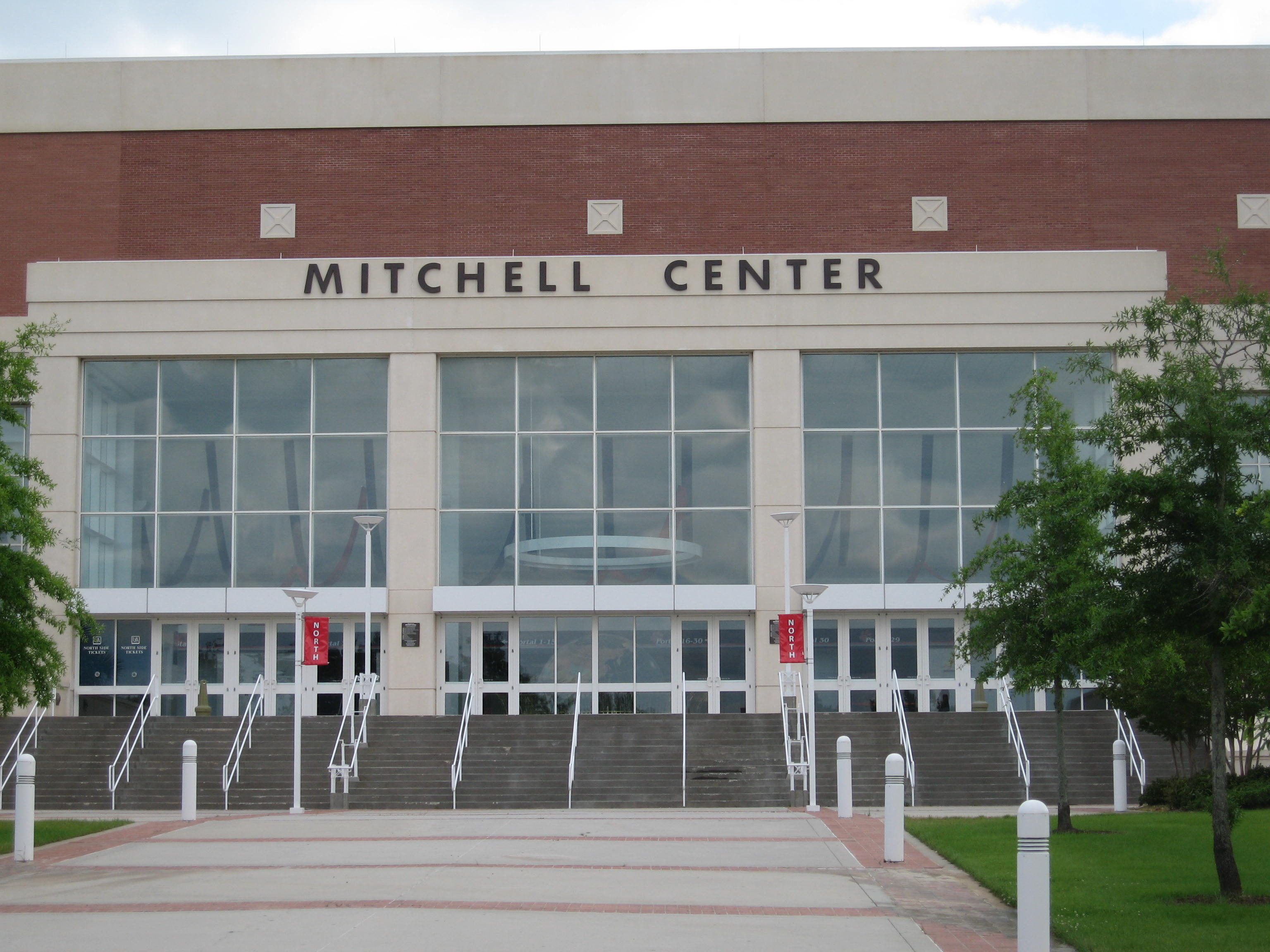
- Interactive map of Mitchell Center
- Location: 2195 Mitchell Center Drive; Mobile, AL 36608
- Coordinates: 30.69229°N 88.17975°W
- Owner: University of South Alabama
- Operator: University of South Alabama
- Capacity: Basketball: 10,041; Concerts: 3,500-10,800
- Surface: Multi-surface

Construction
- Groundbreaking: May 1996
- Opened: June 24, 1998
- Cost: $30 million ($59.3 million in 2025 dollars)
- Architects: Harvey M. Gandler & Associates
- Structural engineers: MBA Engineers, Inc.

Tenants
- South Alabama Jaguars (NCAA) (1998–present); Mobile Seagulls (NIFL) (2001); Southern Alabama Bounce (ABA) (2006–2007); Mobile Bay Tarpons (SIFL) (2011)

The Mitchell Center also known as The Jungle is a 10,041-seat multi-purpose arena on the campus of the University of South Alabama in Mobile, Alabama. It was completed in 1998 and is the home to the University of South Alabama Jaguars basketball teams. The Center is named for the Mitchell family, local real estate developers who have given over US$35 million to various University causes (both the Mitchell Cancer Institute and the Mitchell College of Business are named for them), including $1 million for construction of the Center.

The venue can seat 3,500 for theatrical presentations, 7,354 for front-of-arena concerts, 8,777 for circus and auto racing, and 10,800 for full-arena concerts.

The arena contains 18,080 square feet (1,680 m^{2}) of arena floor space, 6,918 square feet (643 m^{2}) of meeting rooms space and an additional 4,230 square feet (393 m^{2}) in the Globe area, where the Waterman Globe is located. The arena's eight-sided center-hung scoreboard has four video screens. There are 16 ticket windows, a 14,000-watt sound system, a 60-by-40-foot (18 by 12 m) portable stage, four dressing and two team locker rooms, a training room, a production office and in-house catering. The arena measures 63'8" from the floor to the roof. There is parking for 4,450 cars within a ten-minute walk of the arena, including 450 at the arena itself.

The Mitchell Center hosted the 2001 and 2008 Sun Belt Conference men’s basketball tournaments.

The Mitchell Center hosted its first ever NBA basketball game between the New Orleans Hornets and Miami Heat on October 23, 2008.

In the spring of 2011, the Mitchell Center was home to the Mobile Bay Tarpons of the Southern Indoor Football League.

On the May 8, 2007, edition of "Lunch with Lee" on WNSP in Mobile, recently hired head basketball coach Ronnie Arrow called the Mitchell Center "the best arena in the state of Alabama."

When Mobile Civic Center was permanently closed and demolished in late 2024, Disney on Ice moved into Mitchell Center.

A Trump rally was held October 2nd, 2026 as part of a Midterm Election push. Three people were arrested beforehand for death threats targeting President Donald Trump.

== Waterman globe ==
The Mitchell Center's north entrance is graced by the Waterman Globe which originally rested in the Waterman Building (now the Wachovia Building) from 1948 through 1973 and was a major attraction in downtown Mobile. The Rand McNally Map Company painted the original aluminum exterior of the 12-foot (4 m) diameter globe, which depicts countries as they were in the 1940s. The reconstructed globe rotates once every three minutes and 50 seconds. The globe's axis is identical to the Earth's.

The Waterman Globe was part of a total display of painted murals until it was cut into 300 pieces of scrap. Former USA President Frederick P. Whiddon saved the globe and stored it for more than 20 years, anticipating its restoration. USA engineering technician Lanny McCormick completed the arduous task of reconstructing the globe in 1996. Local artist Joe Wilson worked as a modern-day Michelangelo, lying on his back at the globe's new home in the Mitchell Center to restore the paint.

The railing around the globe is original but augmented by new vertical brass safety bars. The globe’s steel base was recycled from a retired USA campus soccer goal. The globe made its second Mobile debut at the May 1999 USA Spring Commencement, which marked the opening of the Mitchell Center.

== See also ==
- List of NCAA Division I basketball arenas
