= 2010 Arkansas Diamonds season =

Indoor Football League team season

- Owner: Jim Smith
- Head coach: Danton Barto
- Home stadium: Verizon Arena; North Little Rock, Arkansas

Results
- Record: 11–3 (regular season)
- Division place: 1st, Lonestar East
- Conference place: 2nd, Intense Conference
- Playoffs: Lost in conference finals

The 2010 Arkansas Diamonds season was the franchise's eleventh season as a football franchise, first in the Indoor Football League, and only season as the "Arkansas Diamonds". The team, led by head coach Danton Barto, played their home games at the Verizon Arena in North Little Rock, Arkansas. The Diamonds finished the regular season with an 11–3 record (6–1 in division play) and first place in the 2010 Lonestar East Division. The team's playoff run ended with a loss to the Billings Outlaws in the Intense Conference Finals. For the 2011 season, the team relocated to Texas as the Allen Wranglers.

== Off-field moves ==
Logo presented when the name change was first announced.

After the af2 league folded following the 2009 season, the Arkansas Twisters initially joined the newly formed Arena Football 1 but shifting league structure and concerns for stability lead to a November 2009 announcement that the team had jumped to the Indoor Football League. However, the rights to the names and logos of the former af2 teams belonged to Arena Football 1. Given the option of paying to buy or lease the trademarks, the Arkansas franchise chose instead to hold a "name the team" contest in late January and became the "Arkansas Diamonds" for the 2010 season. (There had been another unrelated "Arkansas Diamonds" in the Southwest Independent Soccer League from 1989 to 1991 and in 1994 in the United States Interregional Soccer League. Arkansas is the site of the only diamond mine in the United States.) The new team colors for 2010 were Carolina blue, black, and gray.

Diamonds head coach Danton Barto had been coaching the Manchester Wolves in af2 for the 2008 and 2009 seasons. He was the head coach of the Las Vegas Gladiators of the Arena Football League in 2007. In 2005, Barto was head coach of the Memphis Xplorers and led them to win ArenaCup VI, the 2005 af2 championship.

As the season came to a close, rumors circulated (later proved true) that the team's ownership wanted to move the franchise as soon as possible for financial reasons. One reporter compared the team's playoff run to the 1989 comedy Major League in which the players rally to win in order to frustrate the owner's relocation plans. Two months after the playoffs, in September 2009, team owner Jim Smith announced that the franchise was relocating to Allen, Texas, a prosperous suburb of Dallas.

== Roster moves ==
The team held its first open tryout for the 2010 season on December 12, 2009, at the D1 Sports Training Center in Little Rock, Arkansas. Prospects paid $50 to register and were judged on their performance in the 40-yard dash and 20-yard shuttle, vertical jump and agility challenges, plus select skills specific to each position. To expand its search for players, the team held a second open tryout on January 17, 2010, on the campus of Ouachita Baptist University in Arkadelphia, Arkansas.

On December 15, the team announced that its first official player signing for the 2010 season was arena football quarterback James Pinkney. He had spent the 2009 season as the quarterback of the af2's Manchester Wolves.

The Diamonds opened their 2010 training camp on February 15, less than two weeks before the start of the 2010 season. The camp used the practice facilities at Jacksonville High School in Jacksonville, Arkansas, and Cabot High School in Cabot, Arkansas.

In post-season honors, Diamonds defensive lineman Luis Vasquez was named all-IFL second team.

== Schedule ==
Win Tie Loss Bye

=== Regular season ===
Week	Day	Date	Kickoff	Opponent	Results		Location
Week	Day	Date	Kickoff	Opponent	Final score	Team record	Location
1	Sunday	February 28	4:05pm	at Corpus Christi Hammerheads	W 26–18	1–0	American Bank Center
2	Bye						
3	Friday	March 12	7:35pm	San Angelo Stampede Express	W 33–26	2–0	Verizon Arena
4	Saturday	March 20	7:05pm	Austin Turfcats	L 29–31	2–1	Verizon Arena
5	Saturday	March 27	7:00pm	Abilene Ruff Riders	W 53–34	3–1	Verizon Arena
6	Saturday	April 3	7:05pm	Corpus Christi Hammerheads	W 35–21	4–1	Verizon Arena
7	Bye						
8	Saturday	April 17	7:05pm	at San Angelo Stampede Express	W 23–10	5–1	San Angelo Coliseum
9	Saturday	April 24	7:00pm	at Abilene Ruff Riders	W 26–23	6–1	Taylor County Expo Center
10	Saturday	May 1	7:05pm	West Texas Roughnecks	W 71–28	7–1	Verizon Arena
11	Saturday	May 8	7:05pm	Omaha Beef	L 33–71	7–2	Verizon Arena
12	Saturday	May 15	7:11pm	at West Texas Roughnecks	W 41–29	8–2	Ector County Coliseum
13	Saturday	May 22	7:05pm	at Amarillo Venom	L 20–35	8–3	Cal Farley Coliseum
14	Saturday	May 29	6:30pm	at Austin Turfcats	W 21–16	9–3	Luedecke Arena
15	Friday	June 4	7:35pm	Amarillo Venom	W 68–41	10–3	Verizon Arena
16	Bye						
17	Saturday	June 19	6:30pm	at Austin Turfcats	W 54–40	11–3	Luedecke Arena

=== Playoffs ===
Round	Day	Date	Kickoff	Opponent	Results		Location
Round	Day	Date	Kickoff	Opponent	Final score	Team record	Location
1	Saturday	June 26	7:05pm	Corpus Christi Hammerheads	W 44–29	---	Verizon Arena
2	Saturday	July 3	7:05pm	Amarillo Venom	W 46–31	---	Cal Farley Coliseum
3	Saturday	July 10	7:00pm	Billings Outlaws	L 42–53	---	Rimrock Auto Arena at MetraPark

== Standings ==
2010 Lonestar East Division
	W	L	T	PCT	GB	DIV	PF	PA	STK
y-Arkansas Diamonds	11	3	0	0.786	—	6–1	533	423	W3
x-San Angelo Stampede Express	10	4	0	0.714	1.0	4–2	603	521	W3
x-Corpus Christi Hammerheads	6	8	0	0.429	5.0	3–4	501	567	L2
Austin Turfcats	2	12	0	0.143	8.0	1–7	428	606	L10

== Roster ==
2010 Arkansas Diamonds roster
Quarterbacks: 12 Brian Jones; 8 Stephen Wasil; Running backs: 10 Dedrick Poole; Wide receivers: 4 Graylin Allison; 15 Bradly Chavez; 22 A. J. Harris; 18 Bret Smith; 11 Eric Ware	Offensive linemen: 67 Dwayne Delaney; 75 Sam McNaulty; 56 Cody Pree; 73 Korey Raymond; Defensive linemen: 92 Ell Ash; 98 Francis Maka; 44 Luis Vasquez; 90 Richard Washington	Linebackers: 7 Alvin Ray Jackson; 9 Tyler Knight; 21 Blair Phillips; Defensive backs: 5 Ken Fontenette; 1 Martel VanZant; 14 Vickiel Vaughn; Kickers: 2 Brian Umstead	Injured Reserve: currently vacant; Exempt List: currently vacant; rookies in italics Roster updated July 10, 2010; 23 Active, 0 Inactive → More rosters
