= Mike Potts (American football) =

American football player (born 1985)

Cincinnati Bengals
- Title: Assistant general manager

Personal information
- Born: March 6, 1985 (age 41); Pittsburgh, Pennsylvania , U.S.
- Listed height: 6 ft 4 in (1.93 m)
- Listed weight: 225 lb (102 kg)

Career information
- Position: Quarterback
- College: William & Mary
- NFL draft: 2008: undrafted

Career history

Playing
- Pittsburgh Steelers (2008)*; Manchester Wolves (2009); Tulsa Talons (2010); Tampa Bay Storm (2011); Richmond Raiders (2011)
- * Offseason or practice squad member only

Operations
- Atlanta Falcons (2011–2012) Scouting assistant; Atlanta Falcons (2013–2014) Area scout; Cincinnati Bengals (2015–2017) Area scout; Cincinnati Bengals (2018–2024) College scouting director; Cincinnati Bengals (2025–present) Assistant general manager

Career AFL statistics
- Comp. / Att.: 44 / 79
- Passing yards: 428
- TD–INT: 4–4
- QB rating: 62.63
- Rushing TD: 1
- Stats at ArenaFan.com

Mike Potts (born March 6, 1985) is an American professional football executive and former football quarterback who is currently an assistant general manager for the Cincinnati Bengals of the National Football League (NFL).

== Playing career ==
Pre-draft measurables
Height	Weight
6 ft 3 5/8 in (1.92 m)	224 lb (102 kg)
Values from Pro Day

Potts was signed by the Pittsburgh Steelers as an undrafted free agent in 2008. He was released by the Steelers later in 2008. He played college football at William & Mary.

Potts has also played for the Manchester Wolves in 2009, and the Tulsa Talons

He played for the Tampa Bay Storm of the Arena Football League in 2011. Potts finished the 2011 season with the Richmond Raiders of the Southern Indoor Football League (SIFL) after they lost quarterback Bryan Randall for the season.

== Post-playing career ==
From 2011 to 2012, Potts served as a scouting assistant for the Atlanta Falcons. The Falcons would promote him to an area scout in the 2013 offseason.

On June 19, 2015, the Cincinnati Bengals hired Potts as an area scout. In 2018, the Bengals promoted him to the director of collegiate scouting. On July 18, 2025, the Bengals promoted Potts to a co-assistant general manager; sharing the same title with Trey Brown and Steven Radicivec.
