= Route 66 Roller Derby =

Former roller derby league from Amarillo, Texas

- Metro area: Amarillo, TX
- Country: United States
- Founded: 2006
- Dissolved: 2015
- Track type(s): Flat
- Venue: Amarillo Civic Center
- Affiliations: WFTDA
- Website: www.rt66rollerderby.com

Route 66 Roller Derby (Rt66RD) was a roller derby league based in Amarillo, Texas. Founded in 2006, the league consisted of a single team, which competed against teams from other leagues.

The league first began bouting at Amarillo Civic Center for the 2008 season. By the middle of the year, it had already played teams from around the southern United States, and had skaters with a wide range of ages and backgrounds.

In November 2009, Route 66 was accepted as a member of the Women's Flat Track Derby Association Apprentice Program, where they remained through the end of 2014 before being removed from the list maintained by the WFTDA. The final game that Flat Track Stats lists them as playing was in November 2014, and they similarly list the organization as disbanding approximately in November 2015.
