= Permian Basin International Oil Show =

Trade show

The Permian Basin International Oil Show is a biennial trade show exposition which is hosted in the city of Odessa, Texas, US, at the Ector County Coliseum on every odd numbered year. It showcases the latest technology in the petroleum industry and also honors the industry’s past. It is one of the largest expositions of its kind. The Oil Show is for executives and workers in various phases of the petroleum industry and is not open to the public.
