= Adam DiMichele =

American gridiron football player and coach (born 1985)

Nebraska Cornhuskers
- Title: Offensive analyst

Personal information
- Born: July 26, 1985 (age 41); McKees Rocks, Pennsylvania, U.S.
- Listed height: 6 ft 1 in (1.85 m)
- Listed weight: 202 lb (92 kg)

Career information
- High school: Sto-Rox High School
- College: Temple
- NFL draft: 2009: undrafted

Career history

Playing
- Philadelphia Eagles (2009)*; Calgary Stampeders (2009)*; Winnipeg Blue Bombers (2009–2010)*; Erie Explosion (2011); Philadelphia Soul (2012)
- * Offseason or practice squad member only

Coaching
- Temple (2013) Offensive graduate assistant; Temple (2014) Wide receivers coach; Temple (2015–2016) Director of player development; Temple (2017) Offensive quality control coach & recruiting assistant; Temple (2018) Quarterbacks coach & inside wide receivers coach; Temple (2019–2020) Offensive analyst; Temple (2021–2022) Director of player personnel; Nebraska (2023–present) Offensive analyst

Awards and highlights
- SIFL MVP (2011); SIFL First-team (2011)

Career AFL statistics
- Completions: 20
- Attempts: 35
- Yards: 259
- Touchdowns: 3
- Interceptions: 2
- Stats at ArenaFan.com

Adam DiMichele (/dɪˈmaɪkəl/; born July 26, 1985) is an American football coach and former quarterback. He was signed by the Philadelphia Eagles as an undrafted free agent in 2009. He played college football at Temple. DiMichele was also a member of the Calgary Stampeders, Winnipeg Blue Bombers, Erie Explosion and Philadelphia Soul.

== Early life ==
Born to Dominic and Natalie DiMichele, Adam had one of the best high-school careers in the history of Pennsylvania as the Western Pennsylvania Interscholastic Athletic League's all-time leading passer, breaking records set by Joe Montana, Dan Marino and Joe Namath. His basketball teams at Sto-Rox High School went 105–15. He earned first-team All-State honors in three sports : baseball, basketball and football, while being cited as the State Player of the Year in both football and basketball. After signing with Penn State to play football in February 2004, he decided he wanted to go elsewhere and play college baseball instead.

== College career ==
DiMichele attended Okaloosa-Walton College in Niceville, Florida for the 2004–05 and 2005–06 academic years played two seasons of baseball as an outfielder and pitcher.

He was transferred to Temple University in 2006. He was named team captain in 2007 and 2008 . DiMichele threw for 5,024 yards, finishing fourth on the Owls' all-time list, adding 45 touchdowns. He majored in sport and recreation management.

== Professional career ==
=== Philadelphia Eagles ===
After going undrafted in the 2009 NFL draft, DiMichele was offered a tryout with the Philadelphia Eagles and was subsequently signed by the team. He was waived by the Eagles on June 11, 2009. He re-joined to the Eagles on August 12 after backup Kevin Kolb suffered a knee sprain during training camp. He was waived again on August 25.

=== Calgary Stampeders ===
DiMichele signed with the Calgary Stampeders' practice roster on September 21, 2009 only to be released on September 23.

=== Winnipeg Blue Bombers ===
DiMichele was signed to the Winnipeg Blue Bombers practice roster on September 25, 2009.

=== Erie Explosion ===
DiMichele was signed by the Erie Explosion of the Southern Indoor Football League on December 17, 2010.

During the 2011 season, DiMichele commanded an offense that led the league in multiple categories, including average passing yards per game (270.6), team points per game (70.2) and total team offensive yards per game (260). He completed 55 percent of his passes (235-of-427) for 3,247 yards and would throw a league-best 91 touchdowns to just 7 interceptions. For his efforts in leading the Explosion to a 9–3 record and a division title, he was named to the SIFL's First-team Offense and was named league MVP.

=== Philadelphia Soul ===
DiMichele signed with the Philadelphia Soul of the Arena Football League for the 2012 season.

== Coaching career ==
Following his professional career, DiMichele returned to Philadelphia to join Matt Rhule's staff as graduate assistant in 2013. Following the season, DiMichele was promoted to wide receivers coach. DiMichele has been Temple's Director of Player Development since the 2015 season.

DiMichele was promoted to the role of offensive assistant, working with Temple's quarterbacks and wide receivers, in January 2018.

== Personal life ==
His younger brother Alex DiMichele played fullback with him at Temple, before transferring to Robert Morris University, playing linebacker. His other younger brother, Anthony DiMichele, has been a defensive back for the College of the Holy Cross.

Adam now runs a quarterback and linebacker performance camp, Dimichele Brothers Performance, mainly based in Pittsburgh, Pennsylvania, alongside his younger brother, Alex Dimichele.
