= Steele County Free Fair =

Annual event in Owatonna, Minnesota

Coordinates: 44°4′4″N 93°13′20″W

The Steele County Free Fair is an annual week-long summer county fair held in Owatonna, Minnesota, United States, the county seat of Steele County. It is the largest free county fair in Minnesota, displaying over 2,000 animals each year and hosting over 450 vendors who sell food, commercial goods and services, and arts and crafts.

== History ==
The first fair in Steele County was held on October 17, 1860. Prizes were awarded for categories such as "best 6 yoke of working oxen", "best butter churn", and "best wagon made in county". Horse racing featured. There is no record of the fair having taken place between 1861 and 1871, possibly due to the American Civil War. In 1872 it was held in a pasture on Main Street, and until 1917 it was held at various locations in the community. It moved to its current location in 1918. By 1927 the fair became a "free fair" with no admission charged. In the 1930s the fair introduced auto racing and grandstand stage shows with chorus lines, as addition to its traditional attractions. Free entertainment stages were added in 1979.

No fair was held between 1942 and 1945 because of World War II, nor 2020 on grounds of the COVID-19 pandemic.

== The modern fair ==
The fair runs for one week during each summer. Entry to the fair is free, although it does cost to park. The fair is one of the largest in the region, claiming to be "the largest free fair in Minnesota" 24 bands and entertainers perform on the fair's various stages.

The fair is focused on agriculture; about 2,000 animals are displayed each year, and the fastest growing attractions are the horses. Vendors came from 25 states in 2016 and staffed 500 booths, including 100 food stands. Other attractions and events include a talent show, a "Kid's Pedal Pull", and an automobile museum.

== Attendance records ==
Year	Attendance
1996	177,590
2000	251,168
2005	277,782
2010	285,605
2015	307,403
2016	279,797
2017	300,717
2018	313,046
