= Greenville Force =

Logo

General information
- Founded: 2008
- Folded: 2010
- Headquartered: Greenville, South Carolina at the BI-LO Center
- Colors: Red, White, Blue, Silver
- Mascot: Eagle

Personnel
- Head coach: Tony Wells
- President: Tony Wells

Team history
- South Carolina Force (2009) *Greenville Force (2010)

Home fields
- BI-LO Center (2009-2010)

League / conference affiliations
- American Indoor Football Association (2009); Southern Indoor Football League (2010)

The Greenville Force was a professional indoor football team in the Southern Indoor Football League. The team was based in Greenville, South Carolina, with home games played at the BI-LO Center. The Force was the first arena/indoor football team based in Greenville since the AF2's Carolina Rhinos folded following the 2002 season. A team called the Greenville Riverhawks (relocated from Knoxville) was set to join the National Indoor Football League for the 2004 season, but never actually played a game in Greenville, and the following year became the AIFL/A's charter team, the Johnstown Riverhawks.

In their inaugural season, the Force were called the South Carolina Force and played in the American Indoor Football Association.

After the Force canceled its last game of the 2010 season without an explanation, the SIFL dropped the Force for the 2011 season. The league still plans to field a team in the Greenville market in the future.

== Season-by-season ==
Season records
| Season | W | L | T | Finish | Playoff results |
|---|---|---|---|---|---|
South Carolina Force (AIFA)
| 2009 | 7 | 7 | 0 | 3rd Southern | -- |
Greenville Force (SIFL)
| 2010 | 2 | 8 | 0 | 5th | -- |
