= Texas Hurricanes =

Indoor football team

- Founded: 2009
- League: Southern Indoor Football League
- Team history: Texas Pirates (part of 2009); Texas Hurricanes (mid-2009)
- Based in: Beaumont, Texas
- Colors: Blue, Gold
- Owner: Terry Williams
- Head coach: Troy Espirit
- Championships: 0

The Texas Hurricanes were a professional indoor football team based in Beaumont, Texas and a charter member of the Southern Indoor Football League which began play for the SIFL's inaugural season.

Previously known as the Texas Pirates and playing out of South Houston, Texas, the Hurricanes got their new name, ownership, and temporarily moved to College Station, Texas on June 17, 2009, for 3 games. It was then announced on November 9, 2009, that the team would be relocated to Beaumont, Texas.

== Season-by-season ==
Season records
Season	W	L	T	Finish	Playoff results
Texas Pirates/Hurricanes (SIFL)
2009	1	9	0	5th SIFL	--
Texas Hurricanes (SIFL)
2010	--	--	--	--	--
Totals	1	9	0		
