= Houma Conquerors =

- Founded: 2008
- League: Southern Indoor Football League
- Team history: Houma Conquerors; 2009
- Based in: Houma, Louisiana
- Arena: Houma Terrebonne Civic Center
- Colors: Purple, gold, white
- Owner: Southern Indoor Football League (replaced Franklin Thomas during 2009 season)
- Head coach: C.J. Maiden (interim)
- Championships: 0

The Houma Conquerors were a professional indoor football team and a charter member of the Southern Indoor Football League (SIFL). Based in Houma, Louisiana, the Conquerors played their home games at the Houma Terrebonne Civic Center. This was Houma's second attempt at an indoor football team following the National Indoor Football League's Houma Bayou Bucks. The Bucks also played their games at the Houma Civic Center from 2002 to 2004.

They began play in the SIFL's inaugural 2009 season and lost their first five games, all but one by double digits. Despite a poor 1–7 start and numerous off-the-field distractions, the Conquerors finished with two wins in their last three games, earning the team a spot in the SIFL playoffs. In January 2010, the team announced they would suspend play for the 2010 season, but potentially return for the 2011 season.

== Season-by-season ==
Season	League	Regular season				Postseason results	Awards
Season	League	Finish	Wins	Losses	Ties	Postseason results	Awards
2009	SIFL	4th	3	8	0		
