= 2011 SIFL season =

- League: Southern Indoor Football League
- Sport: Indoor Football
- Duration: February 26, 2011 – June 11, 2011

Regular season
- Season MVP: Adam DiMichele (Erie)

Postseason
- Eastern Conference champions: Albany Panthers
- Eastern Conference runners-up: Columbus Lions
- Western Conference champions: Louisiana Swashbucklers
- Western Conference runners-up: Houston Stallions

President's Cup III
- Champions: Albany Panthers
- Runners-up: Louisiana Swashbucklers

Southern Indoor Football League seasons
- ← 2010 N/A →

The 2011 Southern Indoor Football League season was the SIFL's third overall season, the first since its merger with the American Indoor Football Association (AIFA), and the last before its breakup into three regional leagues.

== Final regular season standings ==
Team	Overall			Division		
Team	Wins	Losses	Percentage	Wins	Losses	Percentage
Eastern Conference
Northeast Division
Erie Explosion	9	3	0.750	5	3	0.625
Trenton Steel	8	4	0.667	6	2	0.750
Harrisburg Stampede	2	10	0.167	1	7	0.125
Mid-Atlantic Division
Richmond Raiders*	6	6	0.500	3	1	0.750
Carolina Speed	3	9	0.250	2	2	0.250
Fayetteville Force	3	9	0.250	1	3	0.250
South Division
Columbus Lions	11	1	0.917	5	1	0.833
Albany Panthers	10	2	0.833	4	2	0.667
Alabama Hammers	4	8	0.333	0	6	0.000
Western Conference
Gulf Division
Louisiana Swashbucklers	8	4	0.667	1	0	1.000
Mobile Bay Tarpons**	2	3	0.500	0	1	0.000
Lafayette Wildcatters***	0	12	0.000	0	12	0.000
Southwest Division
Houston Stallions	12	0	1.000	8	0	1.000
Corpus Christi Hammerheads	7	5	0.583	3	4	0.429
Rio Grande Valley Magic	6	6	0.500	3	6	0.333
Abilene Ruff Riders	4	8	0.333	1	6	0.143

- Green indicates clinched playoff berth
- Purple indicates division champion
- Grey indicates best league record
- * = Failed to make the playoffs despite winning division
- ** = Folded five games into their season.
- *** = Suspended operations prior to the season due to lack of Worker's Compensation Insurance

== Playoffs ==
Conference Semifinals
3	Corpus Christi	20
2	Louisiana	59
Western Conference
4	Rio Grande Valley	62
1	Houston	65
3	Erie	43
2	Albany	68
Eastern Conference
4	Trenton	60
1	Columbus	62

Conference Championships
2	Louisiana	56
1	Houston	41
2	Albany	75
1	Columbus	61

President's Cup III
W2	Louisiana	48
E2	Albany	69

- SIFL Championship: Located at the Albany Civic Center in Albany, Georgia on Saturday, July 2
