= Lafayette Wildcatters =

Logo

General information
- Founded: 2008
- Folded: 2011
- Headquartered: Lafayette, Louisiana at the Cajundome
- Colors: Red, Gold, Black, White
- Mascot: Hard Hat, Boudin, Coush Coush

Personnel
- Owners: Joey Arceneaux & Andre Clemons
- Head coach: Skip Foster
- President: Ray Ronquillo

Team history
- Acadiana Mudbugs (2009); Lafayette Wildcatters (2010–2011)

Home fields
- Cajundome (2009–2011)

League / conference affiliations
- Southern Indoor Football League (2009–2011)

Championships
- League championships: 0; 0
- Conference championships: 0; 0
- Division championships: 0; 0

Playoff appearances (2)
- 2009, 2010

The Lafayette Wildcatters were a professional indoor football team based in Lafayette, Louisiana and a charter member of the Southern Indoor Football League (SIFL). They played their home games at the Cajundome, the Wildcatters are Lafayette's second attempt at an indoor/arena football team following the af2's Lafayette Roughnecks, the Roughnecks folded after their single season of 2001.

In their inaugural season, the Wildcatters were known as the Acadiana Mudbugs. They were the only team to start out 3–0 and locked up the No. 3 seed for the SIFL's first ever playoffs. On July 18, 2009, the Mudbugs lost 56–49 to the Austin Turfcats in the playoff semi-finals in the SIFL's first overtime game.

The Wildcatters began their 2010 season with a 44–28 loss to the Greenville Force. Four days later, head coach John Fourcade was let go and the team signed former AFL coach Skip Foster to lead the team.

The Wildcatters canceled their 2011 season due to the lack of having sufficient Workers Compensation Insurance. By the time their announced return of 2012 had come, the SIFL had broken up.

== Season-by-season ==
Season records
| Season | W | L | T | Finish | Playoff results |
|---|---|---|---|---|---|
Acadiana Mudbugs (SIFL)
| 2009 | 6 | 5 | 0 | 3rd League | Lost semi-finals (Austin) |
Lafayette Wildcatters (SIFL)
| 2010 | 6 | 5 | 0 | 3rd League | Lost semi-finals (Columbus) |
| 2011 | Did not play | | | | |
| 2012 | – | – | – | – | – |
| Totals | 12 | 12 | 0 | (including playoffs) | |

== 2009 schedule/results ==
Schedule
| Week | Date | Opponent | Place | Score | Result | Record |
| 1 | 4/18 | Austin Turfcats | Away | 37–29 | W | 1–0 |
| 2 | 4/25 | Houston Pirates | Home | 38–12 | W | 2–0 |
| 3 | 5/9 | Houma Conquerors | Home | 31–23 | W | 3–0 |
| 4 | 5/16 | Louisiana Swashbucklers | Away | 56–35 | L | 3–1 |
| 5 | 6/1 | Louisiana Swashbucklers | Away | 56–35 | L | 3–2 |
| 6 | 6/6 | Louisiana Swashbucklers | Home | 27–21 | L | 3–3 |
| 7 | 6/13 | Houma Conquerors | Home | 35–33 | W | 4–3 |
| 8 | 6/20 | North Texas Crunch | Home | 45–6 | W | 5–3 |
| 9 | 6/29 | Austin Turfcats | Home | 50–40 | L | 5–4 |
| 10 | 7/5 | Texas Hurricanes | Away | 36–12 | W | 6–4 |
| 11 | 7/11 | Houma Conquerors | Away | 40–28 | L | 6–5 |
| 12 | 7/18 | Austin Turfcats | Away | 56–49 | L | 6–6 |

== 2010 Schedule/results ==
Schedule
| Week | Date | Opponent | Place | Score | Result | Record |
| 1 | 3/21 | Greenville Force | Away | 28–44 | L | 0–1 |
| 2 | 4/5 | BYE |
| 3 | 4/17 | Albany Panthers | Away | 64–70 | L | 0–2 |
| 4 | 4/24 | Columbus Lions | Away | 26–54 | L | 0–3 |
| 5 | 5/1 | Louisiana Swashbucklers | Home | 59–52 | W | 1–3 |
| 6 | 5/8 | Albany Panthers | Away | 26–42 | L | 1–4 |
| 7 | 5/16 | North Texas Crunch | Home | 81–17 | W | 2–4 |
| 8 | 5/24 | Greenville Force | Home | 90–19 | W | 3–4 |
| 9 | 5/31 | BYE |
| 10 | 6/5 | Louisiana Swashbucklers | Home | 63–47 | W | 4–4 |
| 11 | 6/12 | Albany Panthers | Home | 48–46 | W | 5–4 |
| 12 | 6/19 | Columbus Lions | Home | 55–58 | L | 5–5 |
| 13 | 6/26 | Louisiana Swashbucklers | Away | 31–30 | W | 6–5 |
| Play1 | 7/1 | Columbus Lions | Away | 22–54 | L | 6–6 |

== Head coaches ==
| Coach | Coaching timeline | Record | Playoff record |
|---|---|---|---|
| John Fourcade | December 2008 – March 2010 | 6–7 | 0–1 |
| Skip Foster | March 2010 – September 2010 | 6–6 | 0–1 |
| Rich Ingold | November 2010–present | 0–0 | 0–0 |

== Roster ==
- 2009 All-league performer ( * )
- 2010 All-league performer ( # )

Offense
| # | Player | Pos. | Height | Weight | Hometown | College | Yrs. Pro |
| 17 | *Omar Haugabook | QB/WR | 6'2" | 220 | Belle Glade, Florida | Troy | 3 |
| 18 | #Sean Comiskey | K | 5'9" | 170 | LaPlace, Louisiana | UL-Lafayette | 2 |
| 5 | Bo Bartik | QB | 6'0" | 190 | Birmingham, Alabama | West Georgia | 6 |
| 7 | Juan Joseph | QB/WR | 6'2" | 195 | Jefferson, Louisiana | Millsaps | 2 |
| 3 | Clarence Cotten | WR/DB | 5'10" | 190 | D'lberville, Mississippi | Mississippi Valley State | R |
| 9 | Antoine Burks | WR | 6'5" | 220 | Gulfport, Mississippi | Mississippi State | R |
| 4 | #Clyde Edwards | WR | 5'10" | 180 | Houston, Texas | Grambling State | 2 |
| 12 | #Steven Korte | FB | 6'1" | 230 | Mandeville, Louisiana | LSU | 2 |
| | John Henry | OL | 6'7 | 350 | Memphis, Tennessee | Middle Tennessee State | R |
| 78 | Damien Jones | OL | 6'5" | 305 | Tylertown, Mississippi | UL-Lafayette | 2 |
| 77 | *Adam Durham | OL | 6'5" | 292 | Montgomery, Alabama | Jacksonville State | 3 |
| 15 | Ryan Scott | WR | 6'4" | 215 | Jackson, Tennessee | Memphis | 2 |
| | Jamaal Young | OL | 6'2" | 315 | Los Angeles, California | Alcorn State | R |

Defense
| # | Player | Pos. | Height | Weight | Hometown | College | Yrs. Pro |
| 1 | *Rudy Johnson | DE/LB | 6'2" | 250 | Kentwood, Louisiana | SE Louisiana | 4 |
| 21 | Jasper O'Quinn | DB/WR | 5'10" | 175 | Mississippi | Mississippi State | 2 |
| 11 | Terrell Sutton | DB | 6'0" | 190 | Jackson, Mississippi | East Texas State | 10 |
| 2 | #Clarence Pendleton | DB | 5'10" | 175 | Wesson, Mississippi | Tennessee-Martin | R |
| 22 | Nate Banks | DB | 5'11" | 190 | Mississippi | Ole Miss | R |
| 42 | *#Mitch Craft | LB/DE | 6'2" | 256 | Cape Girardeau, Missouri | Southern Miss | 2 |
| 23 | Chris McNair | DE/LB | 6'4" | 245 | Gulfport, Mississippi | Tuskegee | R |
| 44 | Byron Santiago | LB | 6'1" | 245 | New Orleans, LA | Louisiana Tech | 4 |
| 33 | Steven Barrett | LB/S | 6'2" | 220 | Carencro, LA | McNeese State | 3 |
| 92 | #Eric Phillips | DL | 6'7" | 290 | Birmingham, Alabama | Southern Miss | R |
| 94 | Lanier Coleman | DL | 6'4" | 295 | New Orleans, Louisiana | UL-Lafayette | 2 |

Coaching Staff
| Title | Name | Experience |
|---|---|---|
| Head Coach | Skip Foster | AFL, AF2 |
| Line Coach | Ron Estay | CFL, USFL |
| Asst. Coach | C.J. Maiden | IPFL, IFL |
