= Mobile Bay Tarpons =

- Founded: 2010
- League: SIFL (2011)
- Based in: Mobile, Alabama
- Arena: Mobile Greater Gulf State Fairgrounds
- Colors: Green, Blue, Silver
- Owner: SIFL
- Head coach: Willie Gaston

The Mobile Bay Tarpons were a professional indoor football team in the Southern Indoor Football League (SIFL). Based in Mobile, Alabama, the Tarpons were to play their home games at the Mobile Greater Gulf State Fairgrounds.

The Tarpons were the third indoor football team to play in Mobile, after the Mobile Seagulls of the Indoor Pro Football (2000) and the National Indoor Football League (2001) and the Mobile Wizards of the af2 (2002).

After four games in its inaugural season, there was a change in ownership of the club. The rumored new owners, Global Sports Group LLC, planned to move the home arena from the Mitchell Center to the Mobile Greater Gulf State Fairgrounds. But when the ownership papers that were supposed to be provided to the group by the SIFL were not delivered by the deadline set, Global Sports Group backed out of taking ownership of the team. Other SIFL teams scheduled to play the Tarpons were credited with wins by forfeit. The Tarpons became the second club from the SIFL Gulf Conference to become dormant in the 2011 season, following the Lafayette Wildcatters going dormant the day before the 2011 season was to start.

== Season-by-season ==
Season records
Season	W	L	T	Finish	Playoff results
2011	2	3	0	Dormant	--
