= Trenton Steel =

Former indoor American football team

Logo

General information
- Founded: 2010
- Folded: 2011
- Headquartered: Trenton, New Jersey at the Sun National Bank Center
- Colors: Black, gold, garnet

Personnel
- General manager: Richard Lisk
- Head coach: Rod Miller
- President: Andrew Bondarowicz

Team history
- Trenton Steel (2011)

Home fields
- Sun National Bank Center (2011)

League / conference affiliations
- Southern Indoor Football League (2011)

Playoff appearances (1)
- SIFL: 2011

The Trenton Steel was a professional indoor football team that began play in the Southern Indoor Football League (SIFL) in the 2011 season. The team suspended operations December 27, 2011. The Steel were based in Trenton, New Jersey, with home games played at the Sun National Bank Center.

== History ==
The team was announced as a 2011 expansion franchise in the American Indoor Football Association (AIFA) during a neutral site game at Sun National Bank Center between the AIFA teams New Jersey Revolution and Harrisburg Stampede on June 12, 2010. The Steel became Trenton's first indoor football team since the Indoor Professional Football League's Trenton Lightning. That team folded in 2001 after only six games played, all losses, because of their owner's indictment on various charges. However, the AIFA was split for the 2011 season and the Eastern Conference teams were merged into the Southern Indoor Football League, including the Steel.

On November 4, 2010, the Steel announced its ownership group, owned by Fanteractive LLC and new team president Andrew Bondarowicz. Richard Lisk, who spent several seasons as the general manager of the Philadelphia Soul as well as the Trenton Titans of the ECHL, was named the general manager. Rod Miller was hired as the head coach with assistants in Kahlil Carter, Jermaine Lewis and Rob Stanavitch.

The team made its home debut March 26, 2011, losing 76–73 to the Erie Explosion before a crowd of 3,620 fans. The team earned its first victory, defeating the Explosion, 65–62, at Erie's Tulio Arena on April 9. The Steel defeated the Carolina Speed 86–42 on April 16 for their first win at home and the first home victory by an indoor football team representing Trenton. With a 52–22 win at the Harrisburg Stampede on June 11, the Steel finished their first regular season with an 8-4 record and qualified for the SIFL playoffs. The team finished its inaugural season with a 62–60 loss to the Columbus Lions in the SIFL Eastern Conference semifinal.

After the season, the SIFL proved to be highly unstable and teams split off to form other leagues by September 2011. The Steel were claimed by a resurrected AIFA, then rebranded as American Indoor Football (AIF), after it had failed to play the previous season with its western teams.

On December 27, 2011, the Steel's management announced that they would not field a team for the 2012 season. High travel costs due to a lack of nearby opponents and a dearth of corporate sponsors led to serious financial losses for the team in its first season. With minor indoor football leagues going through a period of instability, ownership did not believe that the team could operate successfully in 2012 but did not rule out a possible return in 2013.

== Season results ==
League champions	Conference champions	Division champions	Playoff berth	League leader

Season	League	Conference	Division	Regular season				Postseason results
Season	League	Conference	Division	Finish	Wins	Losses	Ties	Postseason results
2011	SIFL	Eastern	Northeast	2nd	8	4	0	Lost Eastern Conference semifinal (Columbus) 62–60
Totals (including playoffs)					8	5	0	
