= Luedecke Arena =

Multi-purpose arena in Austin, Texas

Coordinates: 30°17′40″N 97°37′16″W

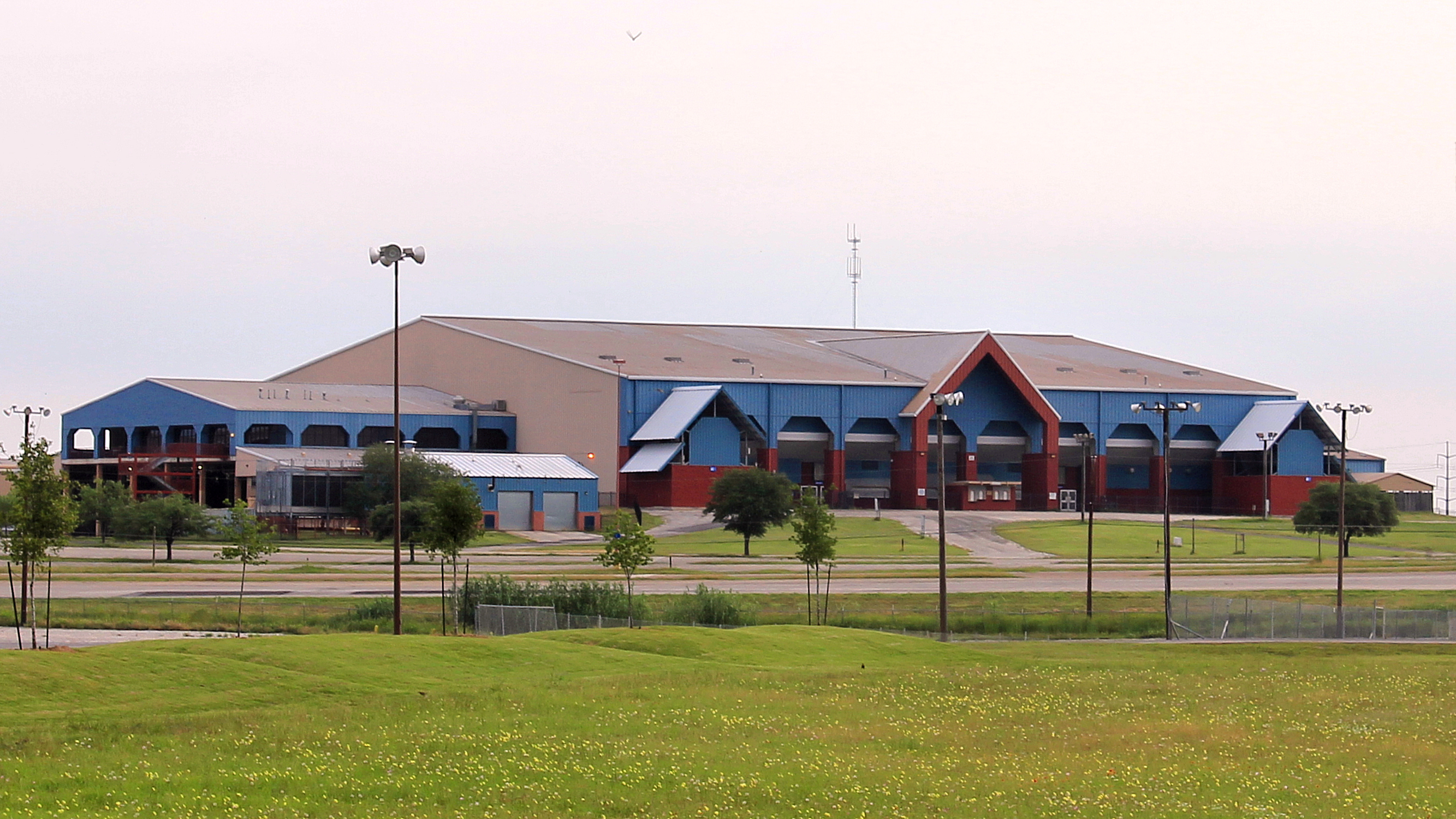
- Interactive map of Luedecke Arena
- Address: 7311 Decker Lane
- Location: Austin, Texas
- Capacity: 6,400

Construction
- Built: 1983

Tenants
- Star of Texas Fair & Rodeo; Austin Ice Bats (WPHL/CHL) (1996–2006); Texas Terminators (IPFL) (1999); Austin Knights/Rockers (NIFL) (2002–2003); Austin Turfcats (SIFL/IFL) (2009–2010); Austin Wild (AAL/IAFL) (2018–2019)

The Luedecke Arena is a 6,400-seat multi-purpose arena on the grounds of the Travis County Exposition Center in Austin, Texas.

Built in 1983, the arena is home to the Star of Texas Fair & Rodeo, the Republic of Texas Biker Rally and the Austin Power indoor soccer team. The arena was formerly home to the Austin Ice Bats ice hockey team from 1996 to 2006. It was also home to four indoor football teams: the Texas Terminators of the IPFL in 1999, the Austin Knights/Rockers in 2002 and 2003, the Austin Turfcats in 2009 and 2010, and the Austin Wild in 2018 and 2019. In 2025, it will supposedly be home to the Austin Wranglers of the National Gridiron League.

Depending on configuration, the arena floor can be configured to seat up to an additional 3,000 for a variety of events.
