= Ector County Coliseum =

Arena in Odessa, Texas

- The Jack-Shack
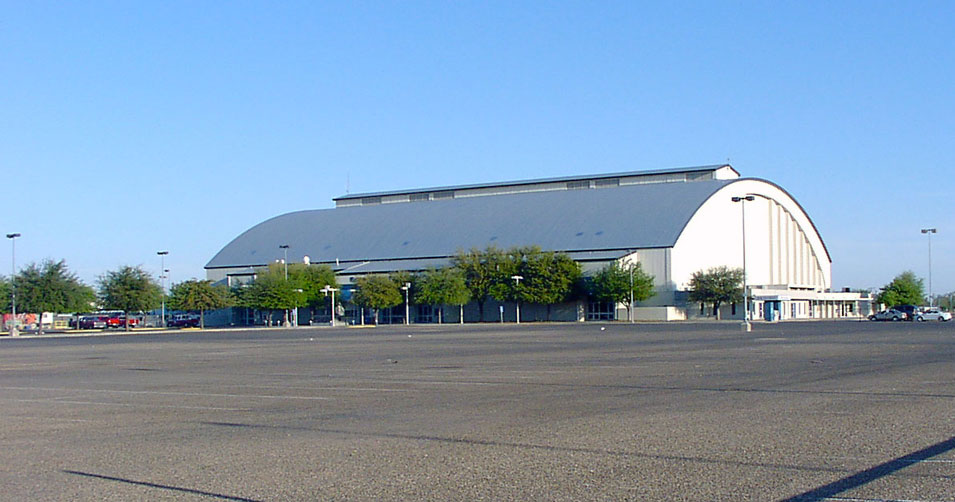
- Interactive map of Ector County Coliseum
- Location: 4201 Andrews Highway; Odessa, Texas 79762
- Coordinates: 31.88388°N 102.38731°W
- Capacity: 5,131

Construction
- Built: 1954

Tenants
- Odessa Jackalopes (WPHL/CHL) (1997–2011); Odessa/West Texas Roughnecks (Intense/NIFL/IFL/LSFL) (2004–2012); Odessa Jackalopes (NAHL) (2011–present); West Texas Wildcatters (LSFL) (2014); Odessa Drillers (AIF) (2026–present)

The Ector County Coliseum is a 5,131 seat multi-purpose arena in Odessa, Texas.

== Tenants ==
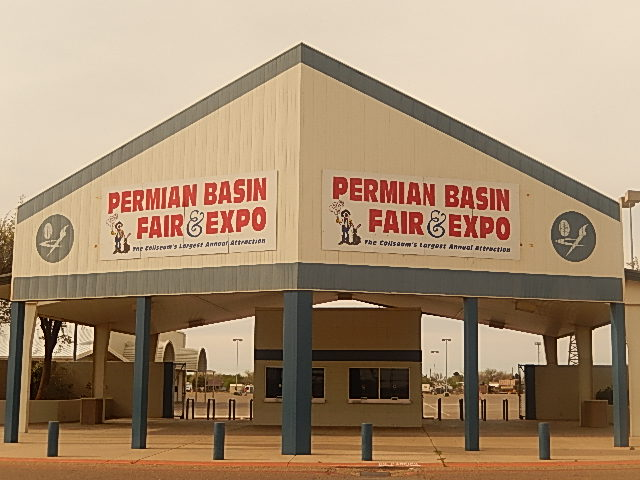
The Permian Basin Fair is held each year at the Ector County Coliseum.

It is home to the Odessa Jackalopes (North American Hockey League), the Sand Hills Rodeo, and the biennial Permian Basin International Oil Show.

Each January the arena hosts a major rodeo, and the animals are kept in a large hall at one end of the arena. This is the same area that, before hockey games, group picnics are served to as many as 500 people.

== History ==
The Coliseum was built in 1954 and was previously the home of the original Odessa Jackalopes team. The Coliseum was the oldest arena still being used for CHL games until the Fort Wayne Komets and their facility, the Allen County War Memorial Coliseum, entered the league in 2010. It was home to the Odessa/West Texas Roughnecks indoor football team from 2004 until the team folded in 2012, then the West Texas Warbirds/Desert Hawks arena football franchise, who played from 2021 to 2024.

On April 29, 1983 - after rehearsing with new production for several days - the British band Def Leppard launched their first headlining tour at the coliseum.

English heavy rock band Deep Purple played the first-ever US gig of their comeback tour at the venue on Jan 18, 1985.

Elvis Presley played two sold out shows at the coliseum on May 29–30, 1976.

The Professional Bull Riders hosted a Bud Light Cup Series event known as "Top Guns Bull Riding" at the Coliseum annually from 1995 to 2000.

Preceded by Steele County Fairgrounds	Home of the Odessa Jackalopes (NAHL); 2011 – present	Succeeded by current arena
