= Taylor County Expo Center =

Arena in Abilene, Texas

- Interactive map of Taylor County Expo Center
- Address: 1700 TX-36
- Location: Abilene, Texas
- Coordinates: 32°25′58.8″N 99°41′31.2″W
- Owner: Taylor County
- Type: Arena, Fairground, Convention center

Construction
- Opened: 1973

Website
- Official website

The Taylor County Expo Center, formerly Taylor County Coliseum, is a 5,000-seat multi-purpose arena in Abilene, Texas. It was built in 1973.

The Expo Center is the former home of the Abilene Aviators, of the Western Professional Hockey League. In 2015, it was announced as the home venue for the Abilene Warriors of American Indoor Football for their inaugural 2016 season. However, prior to their first game, the lease was cancelled due to a "breach of contract" and the Warriors announced they would play their first game in Snyder, Texas.

Elvis Presley played a soldout show here on March 27, 1977 to 7500 fans. He also played a soldout show at the old Expo Center October 9th 1974.
