= Amarillo Civic Center =

Convention center in Texas, United States

- Interactive map of Amarillo Civic Center
- Location: 401 South Buchanan Street; Amarillo, Texas 79101
- Coordinates: 35°12′33″N 101°49′54″W
- Owner: City of Amarillo
- Operator: City of Amarillo
- Capacity: 4,987(Cal Farley Coliseum)

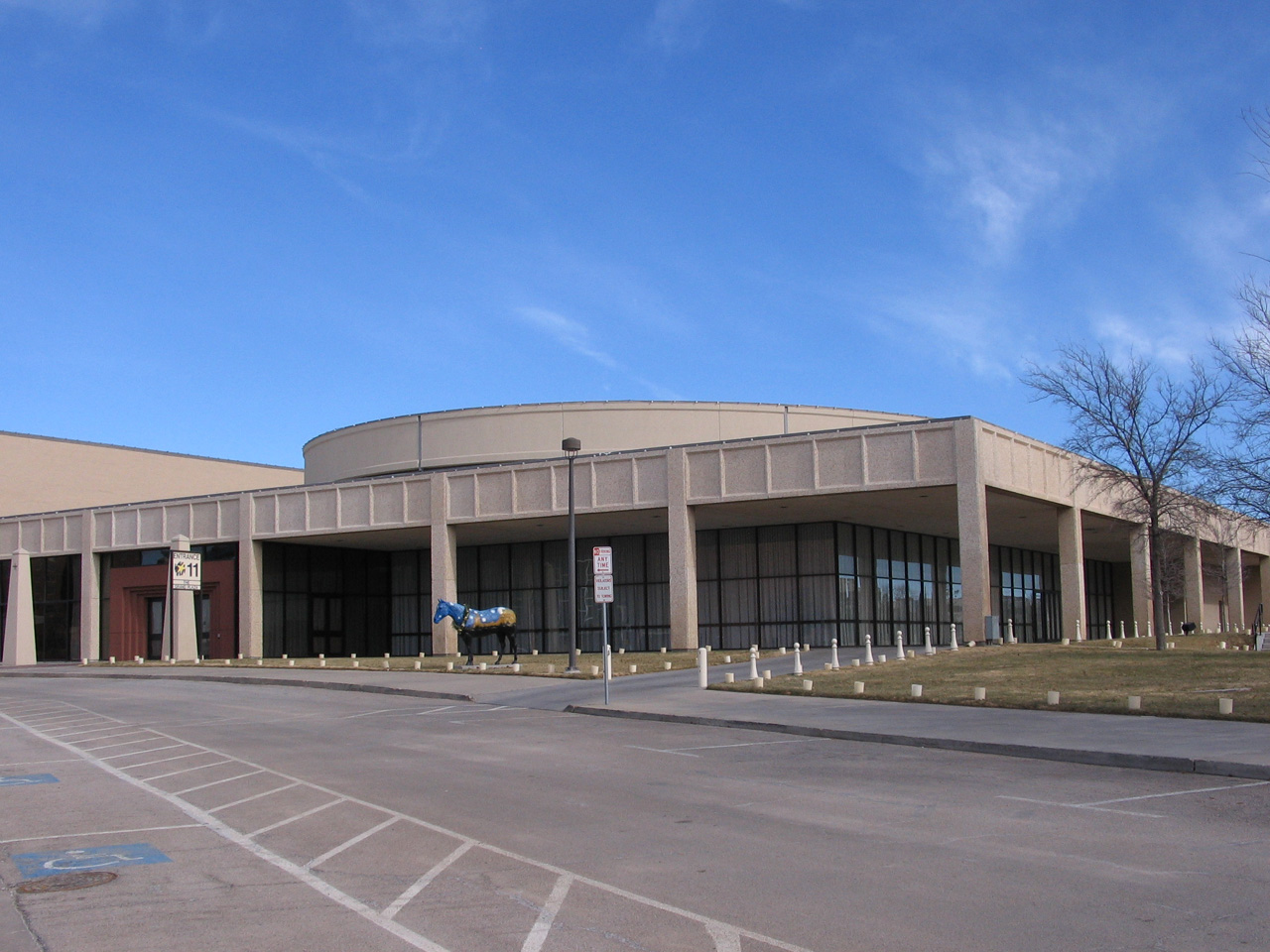
In front of the Amarillo Civic Center which also contains a ballroom.

The Amarillo Civic Center is a multi-purpose convention center in Amarillo, Texas. It consists of multiple facilities including:

- A 2,848-seat auditorium with 2,324 permanent seats used for concerts, Broadway shows and other events.
- The Cal Farley Coliseum, a 4,987-seat multi-purpose arena serving as home to the Amarillo Wranglers of the North American Hockey League and the Amarillo Warbirds of the National Arena League. The arena, which has 4,879 permanent seats, is also used for concerts, banquets, conventions, ice shows, wrestling and trade shows (the arena features 17,100 square feet (1,590 m^{2}) of floor space). The arena measures 38' 10 from floor to rafters, 50'10 from floor to ceiling.
- A 16,000-square-foot (1,500 m^{2}) grand plaza, designed as a tribute to Texas and seating up to 1,100 for smaller concerts, banquets, and other special events. It contains a Texas-accented floor, skylight ceiling, and fountains and planters.
- Two exhibit halls, the North which has 24,565 square feet (2,282 m^{2}) of exhibit space, used for trade shows, conventions, meetings and banquets (capacity is up to 2,200) and with a 25-foot (8 m) ceiling height; and a 26,000-square-foot (2,400 m^{2}), 14-foot (4 m) South Exhibit Hall, also used for similar events.
- Three meeting rooms—the Heritage, Hospitality, and Regency rooms.

Elvis Presley played two sold-out shows at the Civic Center: June 19, 1974, and March 24, 1977.

There is a memorial statue of the Space Shuttle commander Rick Husband, one of the city's most famous sons, in front of the building.
