= Southern Indoor Football League =

Indoor football league in the US

- Sport: Indoor football
- Founded: 2008
- Founder: Thom Hager
- First season: 2009
- Folded: 2011
- CEO: Thom Hager
- Country: United States
- Last champion: Albany Panthers
- Related competitions: AIF
- Website: SouthernIFL.com

The Southern Indoor Football League (SIFL) was an indoor football league based in the Southern and Eastern United States. The most recent incarnation of the league was a consolidation of an earlier league of the same name that was formed by Thom Hager along with Dan Blum, Robert Winfrey and Dan Ryan in 2009 and the American Indoor Football Association, which traces its roots to the founding of the Atlantic Indoor Football League in 2005. The SIFL broke up into three regional leagues after the 2011 season.

== History ==
=== 2009 season ===
Based in Texas and Louisiana, it had five teams for its inaugural season. The Acadiana Mudbugs, Austin Turfcats, Houma Conquerors, Texas Hurricanes, and Louisiana Swashbucklers are the teams that comprised the first season. The 2009 SIFL staff included Commissioner Dan Blum, Director of Operations Robert Winfrey, Director of Communications Dan Ryan, Director of Quality Control Bryan Shoemaker and Director of Creative Services Scott Blanchard. The first round of the playoffs had #1 Louisiana defeating #4 Houma, and #2 Austin defeating #3 Acadiana. The inaugural SIFL season concluded with the President's Cup Championship Game which saw the Louisiana Swashbucklers defeat the Austin Turfcats 59-38.

=== 2010 season ===
The second season of the SIFL played with five teams. The loss of the Austin Turfcats, Houma Conquerors, and Texas Hurricanes were countered with the addition of the Albany Panthers, Columbus Lions, and Greenville Force. The Lafayette Wildcatters, who changed its name from the Acadiana Mudbugs, and the Louisiana Swashbucklers returned for the 2010 season. The 2010 SIFL staff included Commissioner Dan Blum, Director of Operations Robert Winfrey, Director of Communications Matthew Hester, and Director of Quality Control Bryan Shoemaker.

=== 2011 season ===
After the 2010 season, the Greenville Force was dropped from the SIFL. With the exit of the Force, the SIFL added the Alabama Hammers, Houston Stallions, Mobile Bay Tarpons, Rio Grande Valley Magic, and Trenton Steel for the 2011 season. At the same time, the Abilene Ruff Riders and Corpus Christi Hammerheads made the move to the SIFL from the IFL. Gary Tufford took over the reins of the league as Commissioner and built the SIFL into the 16 team league that would compete in the 2011 season.

On November 9, 2010, the SIFL announced its merger with the East Division of the American Indoor Football Association, adding the Carolina Speed, Erie Explosion, Harrisburg Stampede, and Richmond Raiders. It was thought that the Fayetteville Guard would also move to the SIFL but another sports marketing group from Fayetteville announced it would field a new team from the Fayetteville market independent to the Guard. This brought the league total to 16 clubs. In March 2011 it was reported that sports management company Fanteractive was acquiring the league (as well as owning the Trenton and Fayetteville teams), with plans to make it "interactive" by giving fans a voice in team decisions.

The Lafayette Wildcatters suspended operations the day before the 2011 season started and the Mobile Tarpons folded roughly a month into the 2011 season.

=== Breakup ===
A June 2011 New York Times article noted the league's instability. In September 2011, the majority of teams in the SIFL broke off to join two new leagues, the Texas-based Lone Star Football League and the Southeast-based Professional Indoor Football League. The remaining three teams were claimed by the revived American Indoor Football Association. The SIFL stopped releasing information in July 2011 and its website was taken down several months later.

=== Former teams ===
- Austin Turfcats – voluntarily left SIFL after inaugural season to join Indoor Football League for 2010 season.
- Florida Kings – traveling team for 2009; expelled from SIFL after one game (an 81–0 loss) for failing to pay travel expenses.
- Greenville Force – were not listed on SIFL page for 2011 season
- Houma Conquerors – team was dormant for the 2010 season and did not return
- Texas Hurricanes – team was dormant for the 2010 season and did not return
- Lafayette Wildcatters – team was dormant for the 2011 season
- Mobile Bay Tarpons – team played for one month in 2011 and was then dormant for the remainder of the 2011 season.
- Fayetteville Force – original team left league midway through the 2011 season. Temporary team backed by the American Indoor Football Association played out the remainder of the season in the Force's place under the Force name.
- Erie Explosion – team left for the Ultimate Indoor Football League.
- Abilene Ruff Riders – team left for the Lone Star Football League.
- Corpus Christi Hammerheads – team left for the Lone Star Football League.
- Houston Stallions – team left for the Lone Star Football League.
- Rio Grande Valley Magic – team left for the Lone Star Football League.
- Laredo Rattlesnakes – team originally set to be part of 2012 SIFL season, but left to help start Lone Star Football League.
- Alabama Hammers – team left for the Professional Indoor Football League.
- Albany Panthers – team left for the Professional Indoor Football League.
- Columbus Lions – team left for the Professional Indoor Football League.
- Louisiana Swashbucklers – team left for the Professional Indoor Football League.
- Richmond Raiders – team left for the Professional Indoor Football League.
- Trenton Steel – team claimed by American Indoor Football, but did not operate in 2012.
- Harrisburg Stampede – Team claimed by American Indoor Football.
- Carolina Speed – Team claimed by American Indoor Football.

== Champions ==
=== President's Cup ===
Year	Winner	Loser	Score
2009	Louisiana Swashbucklers	Austin Turfcats	59-38
2010	Columbus Lions	Louisiana Swashbucklers	68-13
2011	Albany Panthers	Louisiana Swashbucklers	69-48

== Award winners and notable players ==
=== 2009 SIFL Award winners ===
- MVP: Kimmie Lewis (Acadiana)
- Offensive Player of the Year: Marcus Wilridge (Louisiana)
- Defensive Player of the Year: Kimmie Lewis (Acadiana)
- Special Teams Players of the Year: Tommy Hebert (Louisiana) and Darric Wallace (Austin)
- Lineman of the Year: John Paul Jones (Louisiana)
- Coach of the Year: Darnell Lee (Louisiana)
- Franchise of the Year: Louisiana Swashbucklers

=== 2010 SIFL Award winners ===
- MVP: Cecil Lester (Albany)
- Offensive Player of the Year: Chris McCoy (Columbus)
- Defensive Player of the Year: Damian Daniels (Columbus)
- Special Teams Player of the Year: Trey Crum (Columbus)
- Lineman of the Year: Franklin Lloyd (Columbus)
- Coach of the Year: Lucious Davis (Albany)
- Franchise of the Year: Albany Panthers

=== 2011 SIFL Award winners ===
- MVP: Adam DiMichele (Erie)
- Offensive Player of the Year: Kevin Concepcion (Erie)
- Defensive Player of the Year: Damian Daniels (Columbus)
- Special Teams Player of the Year: Craig Camay (Trenton)
- Coach of the Year: Gerald Dockery (Houston)
