= Mesquite Bandits =

American indoor football team

- Founded: November 2011
- Folded: January 2012
- League: Lone Star Football League
- Based in: Mesquite, Texas
- Arena: Resistol Arena
- Colors: Green, black, gray, white
- Owner: David Hawkins
- Head coach: Rodney Blackshear

The Mesquite Bandits indoor football club was a charter member of the Lone Star Football League (LSFL) that was scheduled to begin play for its 2012 inaugural season. Based in Mesquite, Texas, the Bandits would have played their home games at the Resistol Arena, home of the famous Mesquite Championship Rodeo. Citing financial and organizational issues, the LSFL revoked the team's franchise in January 2012.

== History ==
The LSFL announced the Mesquite Bandits as the eighth franchise set to play in the league's inaugural season. Under the ownership of David Hawkins and leadership of general manager Steve Gander, the Bandits promised an "experienced coaching staff, great players, and a knowledgeable front office staff" as well as "family-oriented events that will be enjoyable for all ages". On December 5, 2011, the team named former professional football player Louis Fite as its inaugural head coach. The team also announced that player tryouts would be held on December 17, 2011. In early January 2012, veteran coach Rodney Blackshear was named to replace Fite as head coach and Michelle Mitchell replaced Gander as general manager.

When the LSFL announced its 2012 regular season schedule on December 15, 2011, Mesquite was set to play 12 games over 14 weeks with home games against the Laredo Rattlesnakes, Amarillo Venom, Rio Grande Valley Magic, Corpus Christi Hammerheads, Abilene Bombers, Houston Stallions, and away games against Houston, Abilene, Laredo, Rio Grande Valley, Corpus Christi, and the West Texas Roughnecks.

At the LSFL's league meetings in mid-January 2012, the league determined that the Mesquite franchise had "not established infrastructure to support the team for the entire 2012 season" and, after a brief investigation, revoked the team's membership in the league. The LSFL had hoped to find a new ownership group to field a Mesquite franchise for the 2013 season but that search was later abandoned.

In January 2013, former Bandits owner David Hawkins was charged wire fraud and operating a Ponzi scheme by the United States Attorney for the District of Colorado. He pleaded guilty to one count of money laundering and one count of wire fraud in March 2013.

== Schedule ==
Week	Day	Date	Opponent	Location
1	Saturday	March 31	Laredo Rattlesnakes	Resistol Arena
2	Saturday	April 7	Amarillo Venom	Resistol Arena
3	Saturday	April 14	at Houston Stallions	Leonard E. Merrell Center
4	Saturday	April 21	Rio Grande Valley Magic	Resistol Arena
5	Saturday	April 28	at Abilene Bombers	Taylor County Expo Center
6	BYE			
7	Saturday	May 12	Corpus Christi Hammerheads	Resistol Arena
8	Saturday	May 19	at West Texas Roughnecks	Ector County Coliseum
9	Sunday	May 27	at Laredo Rattlesnakes	Laredo Energy Arena
10	Monday	June 4	at Rio Grande Valley Magic	State Farm Arena
11	Monday	June 11	Abilene Bombers	Resistol Arena
12	Monday	June 18	Houston Stallions	Resistol Arena
13	Monday	June 25	at Corpus Christi Hammerheads	American Bank Center
14	BYE			
