= Harlingen Collegiate High School =

Public school in Texas, United States

UTRGV Harlingen Collegiate High

Location
- 2901 Medical Drive Harlingen, TX 78550; Harlingen, Texas 78550; United States; 26.16876220703125°N 97.66423034667969°W

Information
- Former name: Early College High School
- Type: Public high school
- Established: 2007
- School district: Harlingen Consolidated Independent School District
- Principal: Dr. Pamela Flores
- Faculty: 23.41 (on an FTE basis)
- Grades: 9-12
- Enrollment: 339 (2022-23)
- Student to teacher ratio: 14.48
- Colors: Teal blue and burning orange
- Athletics conference: UIL Class 3A
- Mascot: Owl
- Website: Official website

UTRGV Harlingen Collegiate High (HCH) is a public high school in Harlingen, Texas. It is a specialized dual enrollment school (part of the ECHS initiative by the Bill and Melinda Gates Foundation) which offers students the ability to earn up to two years of college credit at no cost at the University of Texas Rio Grande Valley (UTRGV), focusing in four general areas: education, engineering, computer science, and college academic core curriculum requirements. Each class is capped at 100 students each (for a max total student population of 400), which encourages a small learning community to support educational success. It is an open-enrollment campus available to all who live in the Rio Grande Valley, with a special focus in recruiting at-risk students and historically underrepresented minorities. The application process for rising freshmen places special consideration on the student's personal goals, college preparedness, academic success, and demographic background. In 2018, 92% of students were Hispanic, 57% were female, and 61% were economically disadvantaged.

Harlingen HCH offers a challenging academic program in grades 9th and 10th geared toward college readiness and project based learning, with full college transition and immersion for respective 11th and 12th grade levels. HCH does not offer school team sports (football, cheerleading, marching band, soccer, etc.); however, it does offer physical education (PE) classes. Students interested in joining high school team sports are allowed to join teams at Harlingen High School or Harlingen High School South.

In February 2019, UTRGV, the city of Harlingen, and Harlingen Consolidated Independent School District (HCISD) signed a memorandum announcing the building of a new Early College High School campus. It will replace the original campus located at Pecan Street across from Texas State Technical College Harlingen (TSTC) and the Valley International Airport. The new $14M state-of-the-art campus was built on Medical Drive near the UTRGV Regional Academic Health Center and Valley Baptist Medical Center, just off South 77 Sunshine Strip. The new 35,000-40,000 sqft. building was opened on October 12, 2021.

== Academic rankings ==
For the 2024-2025 school year, the school was given an "A" by the Texas Education Agency (TEA). Harlingen Early College High School received six Distinction Designations: Academic Achievement in ELA/Reading, Mathematics, Science, Social Studies; Top 25% Comparative Closing the Gaps; and Postsecondary Readiness. 99% of students passed all subjects on the STAAR tests.

US News' Best High School 2019 rankings gave Harlingen ECHS an overall score of 89.31/100, ranking it as the #1 high school in Harlingen, #173 in Texas, and #1,843 in the US.

In 2015, Newsweek's America's Top High Schools ranking placed ECHS at #84 on the "Beating the Odds" list. Newsweek only selects up to 500 US high schools based on their efforts in preparing their students for college while also overcoming the obstacles posed by students at an economic disadvantage. Harlingen ECHS received high marks for all three categories: college readiness (87.3%), graduation rate (100%), and college bound (96.7%).

GreatSchools rated ECHS a 9 out of 10, and gave the school the 2019 College Success Award based on its success in preparing students for college.

== History ==
Harlingen Consolidated Independent School District (HCISD) established Early College High School in the fall of 2007, creating the third public high school (and the first specialized high school) in the city. It initially had a partnership with Texas State Technical College Harlingen (TSTC), which offered high school students the opportunity to complete an associate degree or Certificate program at no cost. The ECHS students who successfully graduated from TSTC usually received an Associate of Science in Biology, a Certificate of Completion in the Academic Core Curriculum, or a Certificate of Completion in the Certified Nurse Assistant Program. The original ECHS campus was located on Pecan Street, across from the TSTC Harlingen campus and next to the TSTC on-campus dorms. Students would take high school classes at the ECHS campus and walk across the street to take college classes at TSTC Harlingen.

The owl mascot was adopted in 2007. It follows the HCISD tradition of high school bird mascots, and the owl was chosen to represent ECHS's academic focus and mission. The mascot's illustration is an altered and recolored (retired) 1997 primary logo from Rice University. The primary color black was chosen to represent the traditional color of graduation gowns, and the secondary color khaki was inspired by the faculty's tendency to wear khaki colored slacks when representing ECHS at official HCISD functions. While khaki is one of the official colors, yellow and gold are often substituted in its place for ECHS event decorations, printed banners and brochures, letterman jackets, and diplomas. This color scheme was changed to orange and navy in 2021 as ECHS transitioned and rebranded to Harlingen Collegiate High School.

The first time ECHS had a full school of four classes (freshmen, sophomores, juniors, and seniors) was in the academic school year of 2010–11, as the school did not accept student transfers planning to graduate in 2008, 2009, or 2010. The original four classes of ECHS students are the Classes of 2011, 2012, 2013, and 2014. The first class to graduate from Harlingen Early College High School was the Class of 2011, and were therefore officially named the "Legacy Class" by the school district.

The Harlingen ECHS National Honor Society chapter was established in the fall of 2009. Juniors and Seniors are invited to join the organization if they meet the minimum required GPA for entrance.

The first pep rally took place during the 2011–12 academic school year. Its focus was to get students excited for an upcoming robotics competition that the Harlingen ECHS Robotics club was participating in. The competition took place at TSTC Harlingen, where the ECHS Robotics team received 2nd place. The first owl mascot costume was purchased later in 2014.

Beginning in the fall of 2017 (and on ECHS's ten-year anniversary), Early College High School ended its partnership with TSTC and entered into a new agreement with the University of Texas Rio Grande Valley (UTRGV). HCISD provides transportation to UTRGV college classes. Students in the Class of 2019 were the first to graduate under the UTRGV program.

In April 2019, the ECHS Robotics team became the first high school in HCISD to advance to the FIRST Robotics World Championship competition hosted at Houston, Texas. Harlingen ECHS students were given the chance to compete with high school engineering and robotics teams from around the world after winning the Alamo West Regional Championship.
