= Mike Salinas (American football) =

American football coach (born c. 1976)

Current position
- Title: Athletic director
- Team: Texas A&M–Kingsville
- Conference: LSC

Biographical details
- Born: c. 1976 (age 49–50)
- Education: Texas A&M University–Kingsville (2000)

Playing career
- 1995–1999: Texas A&M–Kingsville
- Position: Linebacker

Coaching career (HC unless noted)
- 2000: Flour Bluff HS (TX) (DB)
- 2001: Robstown Bluff HS (TX) (DC)
- 2002–2004: Texas A&M–Kingsville (DB)
- 2005: West Texas A&M (DC)
- 2006–2008: Sam Houston State (ST/DB)
- 2009–2010: Harlingen South HS (TX) (assistant)
- 2011: Hardin–Simmons (assistant)
- 2012–2017: Robert Vela HS (TX)
- 2018–2019: Weslaco HS (TX)
- 2020–2024: Texas A&M–Kingsville

Administrative career (AD unless noted)
- 2024: Texas A&M–Kingsville (interim AD)
- 2024–present: Texas A&M–Kingsville

Head coaching record
- Overall: 26–19 (college); 70–26 (high school)
- Bowls: 0–1

Michael Salinas (born c. 1976) is an American athletic director and former college football coach. He is the athletic director for Texas A&M University–Kingsville, a position he has held since 2024. He was the head football coach for Robert Vela High School from 2012 to 2017, Weslaco High School from 2018 to 2019, and Texas A&M–Kingsville from 2020 to 2024. He also coached for Flour Bluff High School, Robstown Bluff High School, West Texas A&M, Sam Houston State, Harlingen High School South, and Hardin–Simmons. He played college football for Texas A&M–Kingsville as a linebacker.

== Head coaching record ==
=== College ===
Year	Team	Overall	Conference	Standing	Bowl/playoffs
Texas A&M–Kingsville Javelinas (Lone Star Conference) (2020–2024)
2020–21	Texas A&M–Kingsville	0–2	0–0	N/A	
2021	Texas A&M–Kingsville	5–5	3–4	T–5th	
2022	Texas A&M–Kingsville	7–5	5–4	T–3rd	L Heritage
2023	Texas A&M–Kingsville	7–3	5–3	4th	
2024	Texas A&M–Kingsville	7–4	6–3	T–3rd	
Texas A&M–Kingsville:		26–19	19–14		
Total:		26–19			

=== High school ===
Year	Team	Overall	Conference	Standing	Bowl/playoffs
Robert Vela Saber Cats () (2012–2017)
2012	Robert Vela	1–10	0–10	8th	
2013	Robert Vela	5–5	4–4	5th	
2014	Robert Vela	10–2	5–1	2nd	5A D1 Second Round
2015	Robert Vela	12–1	6–0	1st	5A D1 Regionals
2016	Robert Vela	9–2	7–0	1st	6A D2 First Round
2017	Robert Vela	12–1	7–0	1st	L 6A D2 Regionals
Robert Vela:		49–21	29–15		
Weslaco Panthers () (2018–2019)
2018	Weslaco	11–2	5–1	2nd	L 6A D1 Regionals
2019	Weslaco	10–3	5–1	2nd	L 6A D1 Regionals
Weslaco:		21–5	10–2		
Total:		70–26			
National championship Conference title Conference division title or championship game berth
