= Laredo Rattlesnakes =

- Founded: 2011
- Folded: 2013
- League: Lone Star Football League
- Team history: Laredo Rattlers (planning stages); Laredo Rattlesnakes (2012–2013)
- Based in: Laredo, Texas
- Arena: Laredo Energy Arena
- Colors: Green, Red, Gold
- Owner: Chad Dittman
- Head coach: Rod Miller
- Dancers: Rattlesnakes Dancers

The Laredo Rattlesnakes were a professional indoor football team in the Lone Star Football League that began play in the 2012 season. Based in Laredo, Texas, the Rattlesnakes played their home games at the Laredo Energy Arena.

Previously, the Rattlesnakes had been announced as members of the Southern Indoor Football League along with the two other franchises owned by Chad Dittman, the Rio Grande Valley Magic and the Corpus Christi Hammerheads. However, in the press conference announcing the team's logos and color scheme, Dittman says that a deal to team up with other Texas teams for a brand-new league is "99 percent" done. That deal was reached in the form of the Lone Star Football League, of which the Rattlesnakes were a charter member.

The Rattlesnakes were the third indoor/arena football team based in Laredo; previous indoor teams included the Laredo Law of af2 (which only played the 2004 season before folding) and the Laredo Lobos of the Intense Football League and later af2 (which played the 2006 and 2007 seasons in these respective leagues before folding).

Originally, the team was called the Laredo Rattlers, however, the Arena Football League issued a cease-and-desist letter to the team because of the existing Arizona Rattlers.

The Rattlesnakes folded following the 2013 season due to the financial and legal issues faced by the team's owner. The team's equipment was auctioned to the public in late November 2013 and the team formally dissolved.

== Season-by-season ==
Season records
Season	W	L	T	Finish	Playoff results
2012	6	6	0	4th	Lost LSFL Semi-Final (47–50 vs. Magic)
2013	8	4	0	2nd	Won LSFL Semi-Final (61-56 vs. Stars); Lost Lone Star Bowl II (69–70 vs. Venom)

== Notable players ==
See Category:Laredo Rattlesnakes players
