= Las Palmas-Juarez, Texas =

- Former CDP
- Coordinates: 26°12′4″N 97°44′17″W
- Country: United States
- State: Texas
- County: Cameron

Area
  - Total: 0.39 sq mi (1.0 km^{2})
  - Land: 0.39 sq mi (1.0 km^{2})
  - Water: 0 sq mi (0.0 km^{2})

Population (2000)
  - Total: 1,666
  - Density: 4,170/sq mi (1,610.2/km^{2})
- Time zone: UTC-6 (Central (CST))
  - Summer (DST): UTC-5 (CDT)
- FIPS code: 48-41581

Las Palmas-Juarez was a census-designated place (CDP) in Cameron County, Texas, United States. The population was 1,666 at the 2000 census. For the 2010 census the area was split into two CDPs, Las Palmas II and Juarez. The communities are part of the Brownsville–Harlingen Metropolitan Statistical Area.

== Geography ==
The Las Palmas-Juarez CDP was located at 26°12′4″N 97°44′17″W (26.201202, -97.737921).

According to the United States Census Bureau, the CDP had a total area of 0.4 square miles (1.0 km^{2}), all land.

== Demographics ==
Historical population
Census	Pop.	Note	%±
2000	1,666		—
U.S. Decennial Census; 1850–1900 1910; 1920 1930 1940; 1950 1960 1970; 1980 1990 2000; 2010

Las Palmas-Juarez first appeared as a census designated place in the 2000 U.S. census. Prior to the 2010 U.S. census, it was split into the Las Palmas II and Juarez CDPs.

=== 2000 census ===
Las Palmas-Juarez CDP, Texas – Racial and ethnic composition Note: the US Census treats Hispanic/Latino as an ethnic category. This table excludes Latinos from the racial categories and assigns them to a separate category. Hispanics/Latinos may be of any race.
Race / Ethnicity (NH = Non-Hispanic)	Pop 2000	% 2000
White alone (NH)	63	3.78%
Black or African American alone (NH)	0	0.00%
Native American or Alaska Native alone (NH)	0	0.00%
Asian alone (NH)	1	0.06%
Pacific Islander alone (NH)	0	0.00%
Other race alone (NH)	0	0.00%
Mixed race or Multiracial (NH)	1	0.06%
Hispanic or Latino (any race)	1,601	96.10%
Total	1,666	100.00%

As of the census of 2000, there were 1,666 people, 400 households, and 368 families residing in the CDP. The population density was 4,170.4 inhabitants per square mile (1,610.2/km^{2}). There were 429 housing units at an average density of 1,073.9 per square mile (414.6/km^{2}). The racial makeup of the CDP was 97.18% White, 0.66% African American, 0.06% Asian, 2.04% from other races, and 0.06% from two or more races. Hispanic or Latino of any race were 96.10% of the population.

There were 400 households, out of which 56.8% had children under the age of 18 living with them, 69.0% were married couples living together, 15.3% had a female householder with no husband present, and 8.0% were non-families. 7.3% of all households were made up of individuals, and 2.8% had someone living alone who was 65 years of age or older. The average household size was 4.17 and the average family size was 4.35.

In the CDP, the population was spread out, with 40.0% under the age of 18, 11.5% from 18 to 24, 25.4% from 25 to 44, 15.5% from 45 to 64, and 7.5% who were 65 years of age or older. The median age was 24 years. For every 100 females, there were 99.3 males. For every 100 females age 18 and over, there were 91.7 males.

The median income for a household in the CDP was $19,911, and the median income for a family was $20,441. Males had a median income of $13,942 versus $11,845 for females. The per capita income for the CDP was $4,973. About 41.9% of families and 45.1% of the population were below the poverty line, including 47.7% of those under age 18 and 42.3% of those age 65 or over.

In 2010, Las Palmas-Juarez had the 11th-lowest median household income of all places in the United States with a population over 1,000.

== Education ==
Las Palmas-Juarez is served by the Harlingen Consolidated Independent School District.

In addition, South Texas Independent School District operates magnet schools that serve the community.
