= Ben Milam Elementary School =

Ben Milam Elementary School may refer to:

- Ben Milam Elementary School in Bryan, Texas: Bryan Independent School District
- Ben Milam Elementary School in Conroe, Texas: Conroe Independent School District
- Ben Milam Elementary School in Dallas: Dallas Independent School District
- Ben Milam Elementary School in Harlingen, Texas: Harlingen Consolidated Independent School District
- Ben Milam Elementary School in McAllen, Texas: McAllen Independent School District
- Ben Milam Elementary School in Houston: Houston Independent School District (closed in May 2004)
