= Leo Araguz =

American football player (born 1970)

No. 2
- Position: Punter

Personal information
- Born: January 18, 1970 (age 56); Pharr, Texas, U.S.
- Listed height: 5 ft 11 in (1.80 m)
- Listed weight: 190 lb (86 kg)

Career information
- High school: Harlingen (Harlingen, Texas)
- College: Stephen F. Austin
- NFL draft: 1993: undrafted

Career history
- Miami Dolphins (1994)*; San Diego Chargers (1995)*; Rhein Fire (1996); Oakland Raiders (1996–1999); St. Louis Rams (2001)*; Detroit Lions (2001); New York/New Jersey Hitmen (2001); Kansas City Chiefs (2003)*; Minnesota Vikings (2003); Seattle Seahawks (2005); Baltimore Ravens (2006)*; Rio Grande Valley Magic (2011–2013); Rio Grande Valley Sol (2014–2015)
- * Offseason or practice squad member only

Awards and highlights
- 2× Second-team All-SLC (1990, 1991); NFL records: Most punts in a game: 16 (1998); Most punt yards in a game: 709 (1998)

Career NFL statistics
- Games played: 60
- Punts: 322
- Punting Yards: 13,731
- Punting Avg: 42.6
- Stats at Pro Football Reference

Leobardo Jaime Araguz (born January 18, 1970) is an American former professional football player who was a punter in the National Football League (NFL) for the Oakland Raiders, Detroit Lions, Minnesota Vikings, and Seattle Seahawks. He also was a member of the Rhein Fire, New York/New Jersey Hitmen and Rio Grande Valley Sol. He played college football for the Stephen F. Austin Lumberjacks.

== Early life ==
Araguz attended Harlingen High School in Harlingen, Texas, where he began playing football and was a four-year starter at kicker and punter. As a senior, he contributed to the team winning a Class 5A District Championship.

He also competed in soccer.

== College career ==
Araguz accepted a football scholarship from NCAA Division I-AA Stephen F. Austin State University, where he was a four-year letterman.

As a junior, he led the conference in average yards per punt (42.6).

== Professional career ==
In July 1993, he had a two-day tryout with the Dallas Cowboys, but the team didn't sign him to a contract. On March 28, 1994, he signed as a free agent with the Miami Dolphins. He was released on July 11. On April 29, 1995, he signed with the San Diego Chargers. He was released on August 21. In the meantime, he worked as a substitute teacher at Coakley Middle School in his hometown, where he earned $50 a day.

In 1996, he was selected in the 17th round (103rd overall) by the Rhein Fire of the World League of American Football (WLAF), based on the recommendation of kicking coordinator Doug Blevins, who had seen Araguz during his tryouts with the Dolphins and Chargers. He had 41 punts for a 42.3-yard average (second in the league). He also was the kicker for the field goals (8-of-15 for a 53.3%), while international player Manfred Burgsmüller kicked the extra points.

In 1996, the Oakland Raiders stalwart punter Jeff Gossett was lost for the season with four broken ribs he suffered in the twelfth game against the Seattle Seahawks. Araguz was tried out along with other punters, but lost out to Rich Camarillo, who pulled a groin muscle during warm-ups for his first game against the Miami Dolphins, which gave Araguz the opportunity to punt in the final three games of the season. His first punt went for 52 yards against the Kansas City Chiefs. His production of 13 punts for 534 yards (41-yard avg.) gave the Raiders confidence to release Gossett on February 14, 1997. In 1997, he finished fifth in the league with 4,189 punting yards, and his 45-yards average ranked second in franchise history, behind the 45.3-yards per punt average set by Pro Football Hall of Famer Ray Guy in 1973. In 1998, he set the NFL record for the most punts in a single-game (16), in a 7–6 win over the San Diego Chargers on October 11. In that game, Araguz made a solo tackle of Chargers punt returner Latario Rachal, preventing a likely touchdown on a sequence where the Chargers instead settled for a field goal. In 2000, the Raiders drafted punter Shane Lechler in the fifth round and released Araguz on August 27.

In 2001, he played for the New York/New Jersey Hitmen in the XFL, posting 44 punts for 1,788 yards (40.6-yard avg.).

On June 14, 2001, he signed with the St. Louis Rams. On August 27, he was released before the start of the season, after losing the punter job to John Baker.

On November 27, 2001, he was signed by the Detroit Lions to replace an injured John Jett. He averaged 41.9 yards per punt in 3 games. He was released after Jett recovered on December 18, 2001.

On May 12, 2003, he signed with the Kansas City Chiefs. He was released before the start of the season, after losing the punter job to Jason Baker.

On December 16, 2003, he was signed by the Minnesota Vikings to replace rookie Eddie Johnson. He played in 2 games, registering 7 punts with a 38.7-yard average.

On February 23, 2005, he signed with the Seattle Seahawks. He beat out Chris Kluwe for the punting job during the preseason, but after averaging 46 yards per punt in the season opener, his numbers dropped. On October 5, he was released after the fourth game and replaced with Tom Rouen.

On April 13, 2006, he signed with the Baltimore Ravens. He was released before the start of the season on September 1.

He played for the Rio Grande Valley Sol of the X-League Indoor Football from 2011 to 2015.

== Personal life ==
Araguz owns a construction company. He has three children: Alek, Noelle, and Nia.
