= Comerica Center =

Sports stadium in Frisco, Texas, U.S.

Fifth Third Arena (Frisco, Texas)
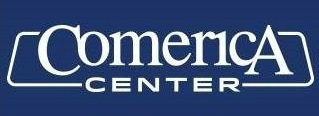

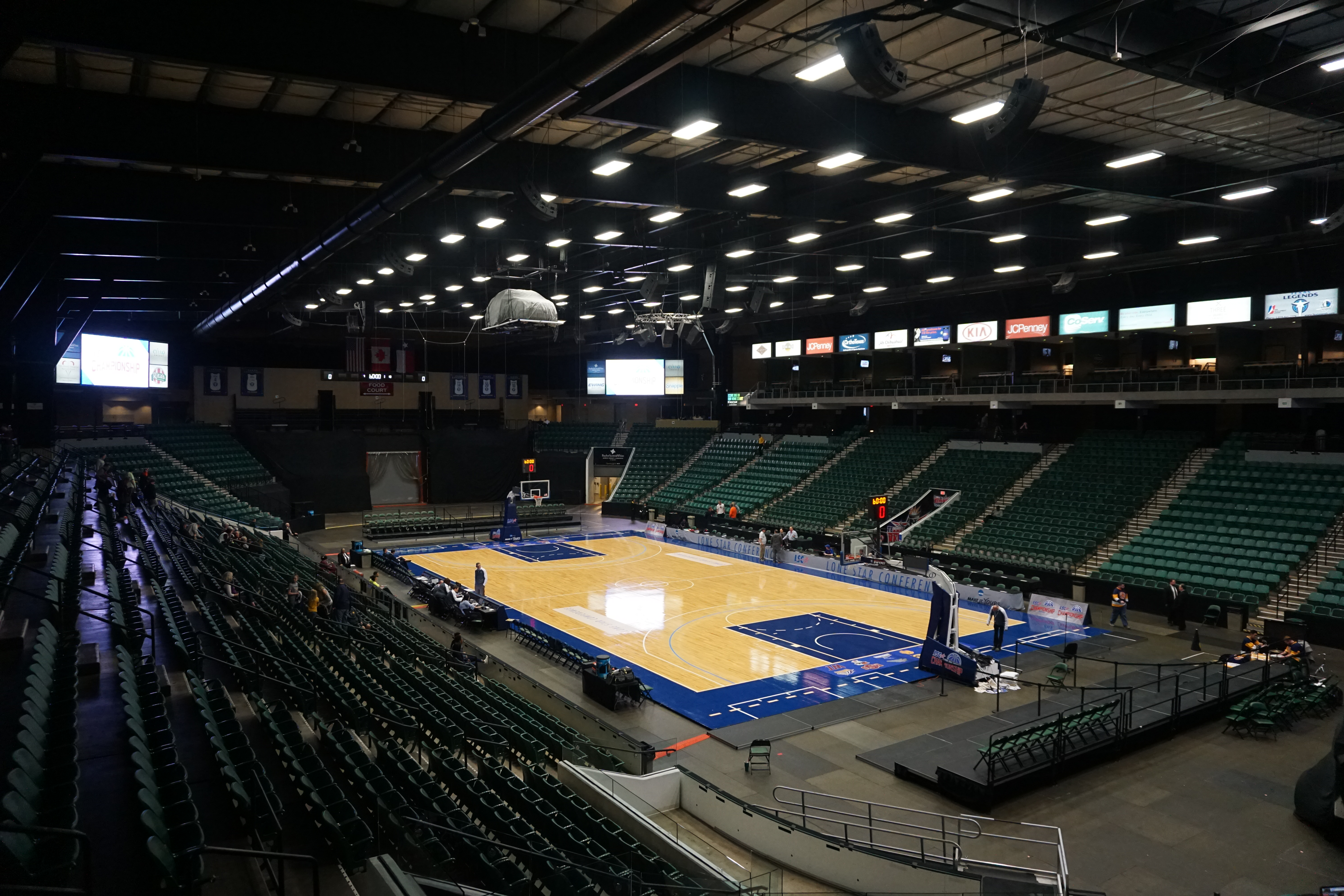

- Location within Texas Location within the United States
- Former names: Deja Blue Arena (2003–2008); Dr Pepper Arena (2009–2019); Comerica Center (2019–2026)
- Address: 2601 Avenue of the Stars
- Location: Frisco, Texas
- Coordinates: 33.101026°N 96.819624°W
- Owner: City of Frisco
- Operator: Dallas Stars
- Capacity: Ice hockey: 3,500; Basketball: 4,000–4,500; Concerts: 7,000 (standing room only)
- Executive suites: 12
- Surface: Multi-surface

Construction
- Groundbreaking: 2002.5.24
- Opened: 2003.9.19
- Renovated: 2008–2009
- Cost: US$27 million US$39 million (renovation)
- Architect: Balfour Beatty/HKS, Inc.

Tenants
- Texas Legends (NBAGL) (2010–present); Dallas Pulse (MLV) (2026–present); Allen Americans (ECHL) (2026); Frisco ISD Hockey Club (AT&T MHSHL)(2003-present); Past tenants: Texas Tornado (NAHL) (2003–2008, 2009–2013); Frisco Thunder (IntenseFL) (2007–2008); Dallas Desire (LFL) (2016); Texas Revolution (CIF) (2018); Frisco Fighters (IFL) (2021–2024)

Website
- www.comericacenter.com

Fifth Third Arena (previously Deja Blue Arena, Dr Pepper Arena, and Comerica Center) is a multi-purpose arena in Frisco, Texas. It is the home of the Texas Legends of the NBA G League, as well as the executive offices and practice facility of the National Hockey League's Dallas Stars. The arena is also used for concerts and other live entertainment events. It seats between 5,000 and 7,000 people and has a 2,100-vehicle parking garage.

== Arena information and history ==
The Fifth Third Arena encompasses the Dallas Stars' practice facility, executive offices, community ice rink and a 6,000 seat multipurpose arena.

The center originally opened in 2003 with a 3,500 seat main venue. The Dr Pepper Snapple Group held the naming rights to the arena from its opening until 2019, but the arena was originally known as the Deja Blue Arena through 2008.

In 2008, the arena was closed to commence a $39 million renovation project, which was completed in June 2009. The renovations increased the arena's capacity to 6,000 seats, and added a 1,000-space parking garage, 12 luxury suites, and a VIP club. Once renovations were complete in the fall of 2009, the arena's name was changed to Dr Pepper Arena (2009–19).

Comerica Bank secured the naming rights on January 18, 2019. The deal, jointly announced between the newly renamed Comerica Center, Comerica Bank, and the Dallas Stars, also secured the Dallas Stars' partnership with the arena through the 2023-24 NHL season. Following Comerica’s merger with Fifth Third Bank, the building was renamed Fifth Third Arena on November 10, 2026.

== Current sports ==
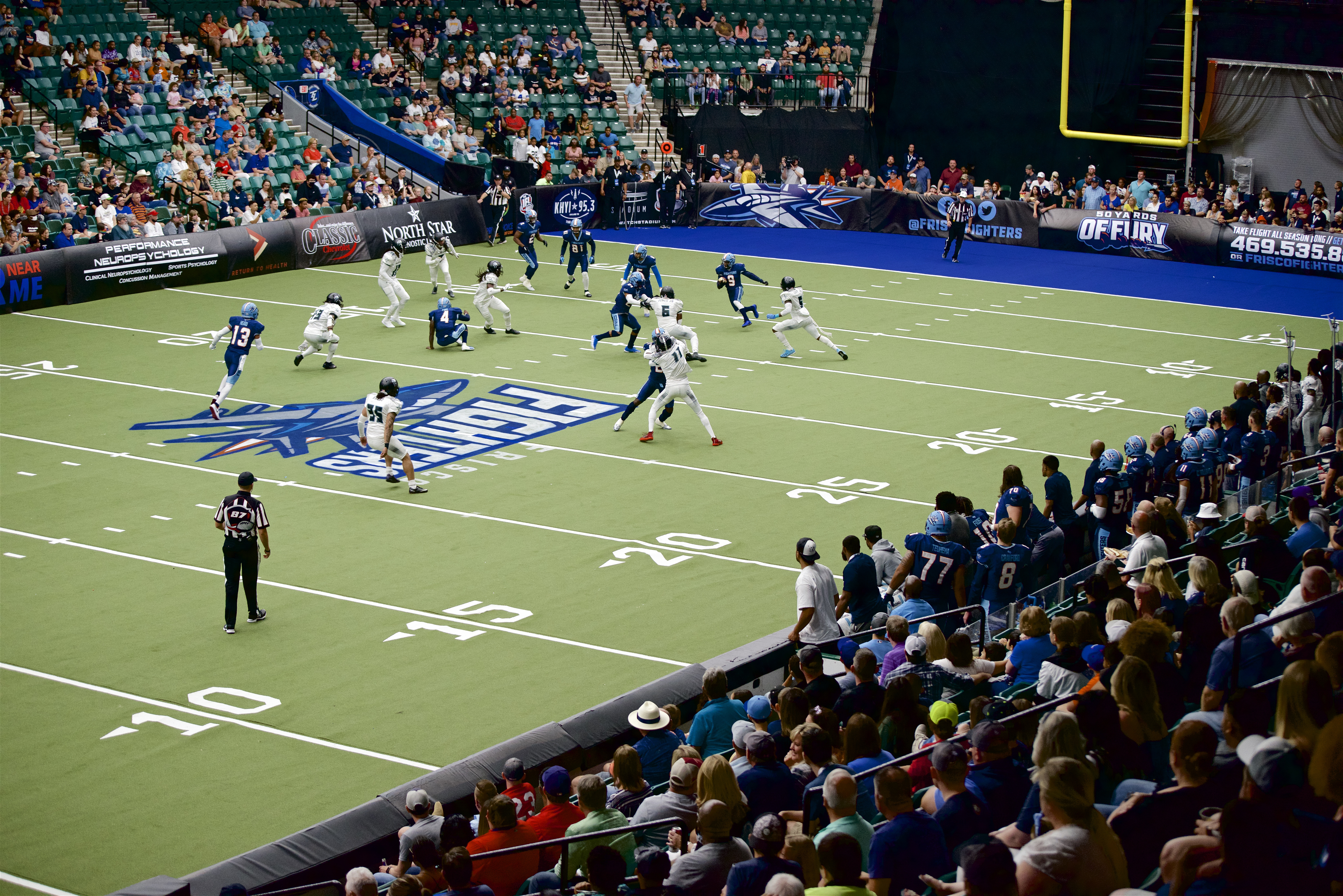
The inaugural home opener of the Frisco Fighters at the Comerica Center.

The Comerica Center is home of the Texas Legends of the NBA G League, the official minor league basketball organization of the National Basketball Association (NBA). The Legends, previously the Colorado 14ers, moved to Frisco prior to the 2010–11 season and have played in the Comerica Center since their move to Frisco.

The Comerica Center was also home to the Frisco Fighters, a professional indoor football team playing in the Indoor Football League. The Fighters were established in 2019 and originally scheduled to begin play in the Comerica Center starting in 2020. After the 2020 IFL season was canceled due to the COVID-19 pandemic, the team played its inaugural home opener at the Comerica Center on June 5, 2021.

The World Olympic Gymnastics Academy hosts the annual WOGA Classic meet at the arena, which has competitions from levels 1–10 as well as an International elite competition.

The ECHL Allen Americans (Ottawa Senators affiliate) will host games at the Comerica Center during the 2026-27 ECHL season, as the Credit Union of Texas Event Center is unavailable for the first month of the season as a result of hosting three rounds of the 2026 League of Legends World Championship.

== Past sports ==
The arena served as the home of the Texas Tornado team of the North American Hockey League, from 2003 until 2013, when the team was sold and moved to North Richland Hills.

Multiple indoor football teams operated at the arena. In 2006, the Comerica Center was the home of the Frisco Thunder team of the Intense Football League. The Texas Revolution of Champions Indoor Football played at the arena during their 2018 season. A Lone Star Football League team to be called the Frisco Falcons was announced for a spring 2012 start but collapsed before the season began. From 2021 to 2024, Comerica Center was home to the Frisco Fighters of the Indoor Football League.

The arena's south parking lot has served as the Metroplex venue for some of Cirque du Soleil's Grand Chapiteau shows, while the arena itself has served as a Metroplex venue for its arena shows.

The arena hosted the 2012 Robertson Cup Tournament to decide the champion of the NAHL, with the Texas Tornado ultimately winning the championship. It is the second time the venue has hosted the event. It also hosted the 2013 Robertson Cup with the Amarillo Bulls winning the championship.

On March 23–26, 2016, the Comerica Center hosted the NCAA Men's Division II Basketball Elite Eight, which was won by Augustana University of South Dakota.

In 2021, Comerica Center hosted a majority of the National Invitational Tournament, including the championship match on March 28.
