= Eddie Johnson (punter) =

American football player (born 1981)

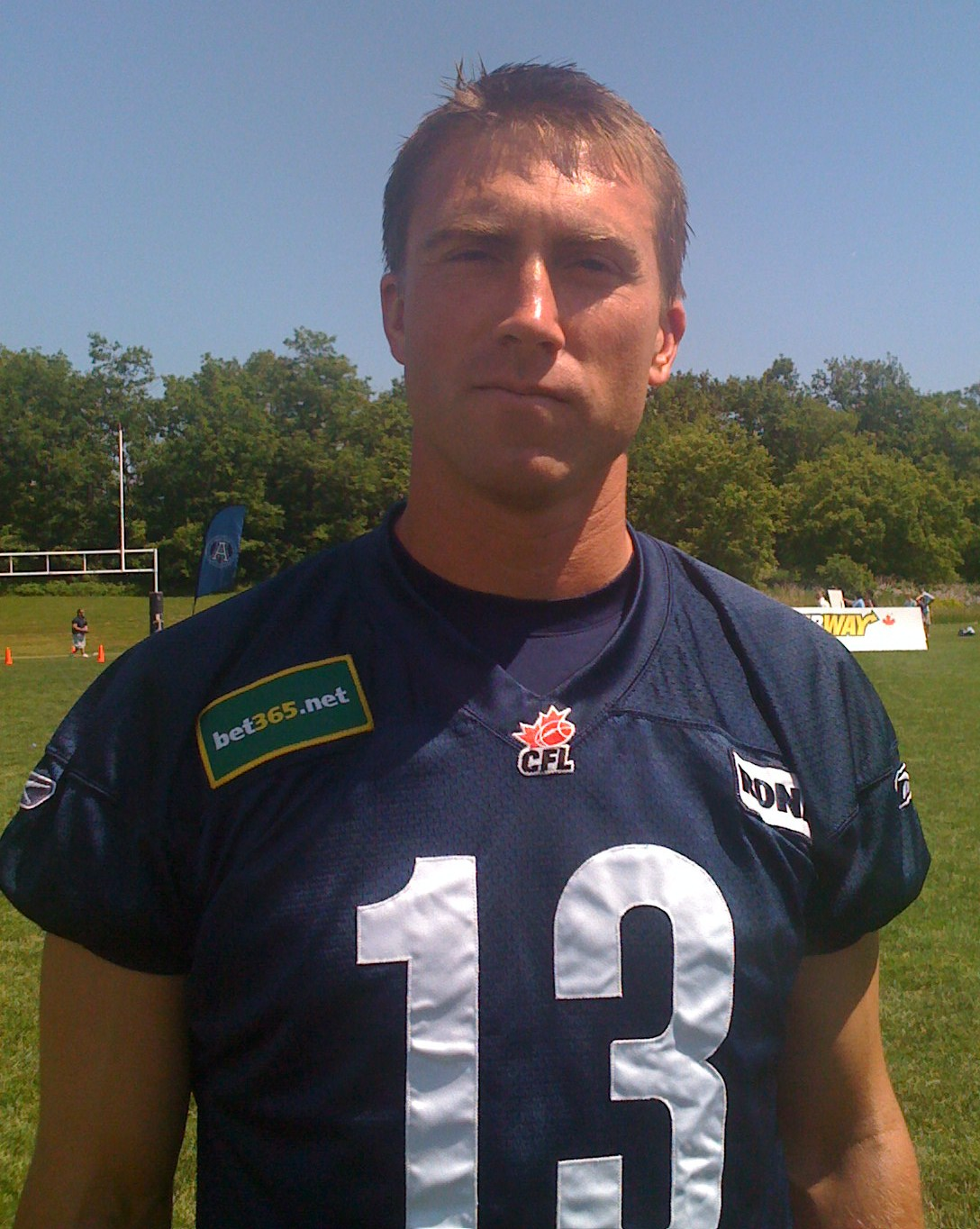
- Johnson with the Toronto Argonauts in 2009

Profile
- Position: Punter

Personal information
- Born: March 2, 1981 (age 45); Newport Beach, California, U.S.
- Listed height: 6 ft 3 in (1.91 m)
- Listed weight: 236 lb (107 kg)

Career information
- High school: Newport Harbor
- College: Idaho State
- NFL draft: 2003: 6th round, 180th overall pick

Career history
- Minnesota Vikings (2003); Cincinnati Bengals (2004)*; New York Giants (2005)*; Jacksonville Jaguars (2005)*; Washington Redskins (2006)*; Denver Broncos (2007)*; Detroit Lions (2008)*; Toronto Argonauts (2009); Saskatchewan Roughriders (2010–2011)
- * Offseason or practice squad member only

Career NFL statistics
- Punts: 56
- Punting yards: 2,191
- Longest punt: 55
- Stats at Pro Football Reference
- Stats at CFL.ca (archive)

Edward Lynn Johnson (born March 2, 1981) is an American former professional football player who was a punter in the National Football League (NFL) and Canadian Football League (CFL). He was selected by the Minnesota Vikings in the sixth round of the 2003 NFL draft. He played college football for the Idaho State Bengals.

Johnson was also a member of the Cincinnati Bengals, New York Giants, Jacksonville Jaguars, Washington Redskins, Denver Broncos, Detroit Lions, Toronto Argonauts and Saskatchewan Roughriders.

== Early life ==
Attended Newport Harbor High School in Newport, California. There he became a three-year letter-winner, averaging 42.3 yards per kick as a senior, and earning all-state, all-county, and All-Sea View honors.

== College career ==
Began his college career at Orange Coast College, where he lettered as a kicker and backup quarterback for two seasons. Averaged 38 yards per punt as a freshman (1999) and over 40 yards per kick as a sophomore (2000). Had one of the finest NCAA seasons by a punter, earning first-team All-America in 2001, as he led the nation with a 46.3-yard gross average with a net of 44.3. Posted a 45.7-yard average in 2002 with a long of 80 yards, adding eight touchbacks and 15 punts inside the 20. Also handled kickoff duties for the Bengals and recorded touchbacks on nearly 75 percent of his kickoffs. He also majored in sports medicine.

== Professional career ==
=== Minnesota Vikings ===
He was selected by the Minnesota Vikings with the 180th overall pick in the 2003 NFL draft. Johnson showed a lot of promise after showing exceptional leg strength and posting good results throughout mini-camp, training camp, and the pre-season. Once the regular season began, however, Johnson's play became very inconsistent and erratic as he struggled getting the ball away like he had in college. After 14 games, he was benched in favor of veteran Leo Araguz.

After an inconsistent rookie season, Johnson was put into a competition for the punting job against veteran Darren Bennett the following off-season. He was noted for developing a funky hitch in his step during mini-camp, something neither he nor his coaches knows how he developed the bad habit. Though he posted good numbers, Johnson lost the battle and was subsequently released July 23, days before training camp started.

=== Cincinnati Bengals ===
He was claimed off waivers by the Cincinnati Bengals on July 26, but suffered an undisclosed injury a week into training camp and was waived August 23. He then had a tryout with the Kansas City Chiefs on August 30, but did not impress the coaches and wasn't signed.

=== New York Giants ===
Was signed by the New York Giants on January 21. He was then allocated to NFL Europa for the 2005 season. Johnson was released March 23 from the Giants.

=== Jacksonville Jaguars ===
Johnson was signed to a 1-year deal by the Jacksonville Jaguars on July 17 and competed for the job against Chris Hanson. He was released August 30.

=== Washington Redskins ===
On August 29, Johnson signed a contract with the Washington Redskins. He was suddenly released from the team later that same day after one practice.

=== Denver Broncos ===
He signed a contract with the Denver Broncos on January 2. After Todd Sauerbrun signed a contract to rejoin the team, Johnson was waived.

=== Detroit Lions ===
The Detroit Lions signed Johnson to a contract on July 30 to compete with Nick Harris for the job. He made the final 53-man roster, but was waived after week 1.

=== Toronto Argonauts ===
On May 29, 2009, Johnson was signed by the Toronto Argonauts of the Canadian Football League and competed with fellow new import kicker Justin Medlock for the kicking spot vacated by the retirement of Mike Vanderjagt. At the end of training camp, the Argos elected to keep both kickers and coach Bart Andrus elected to start Johnson for game one and placed Medlock on the practice roster. Johnson, however, was injured on the opening kickoff when he separated his shoulder when tackling the return man and Medlock was slated to kick for game two of the 2009 Toronto Argonauts season.

On May 11, 2010, Johnson was released by the Argonauts.

=== Saskatchewan Roughriders ===
On July 22, 2010, Johnson was signed by the Saskatchewan Roughriders of the Canadian Football League to compete with incumbent punter, import Louie Sakoda for the kicking spot after Sakoda's poor performance in the previous week's game against the Edmonton Eskimos. Johnson was awarded the start against the Calgary Stampeders for the July 24, 2010 matchup. Late in the 2010 season, Johnson became a popular personality in rider nation owing to his sense of humour in interviews and the novelty he built up around his moustache; during Grey Cup week, fans were seen sporting fake moustaches and custom-made jerseys bearing Johnson's number 11 and the name "Slick Eddie", the punter's popular nickname, on the back. He played in six games in 2011 before being sidelined with a nagging injury. He was eventually placed on the nine-game injured list and sat out the rest of the season. Johnson was released on December 13, 2011.
