= Sames Auto Arena =

Arena in Laredo TX

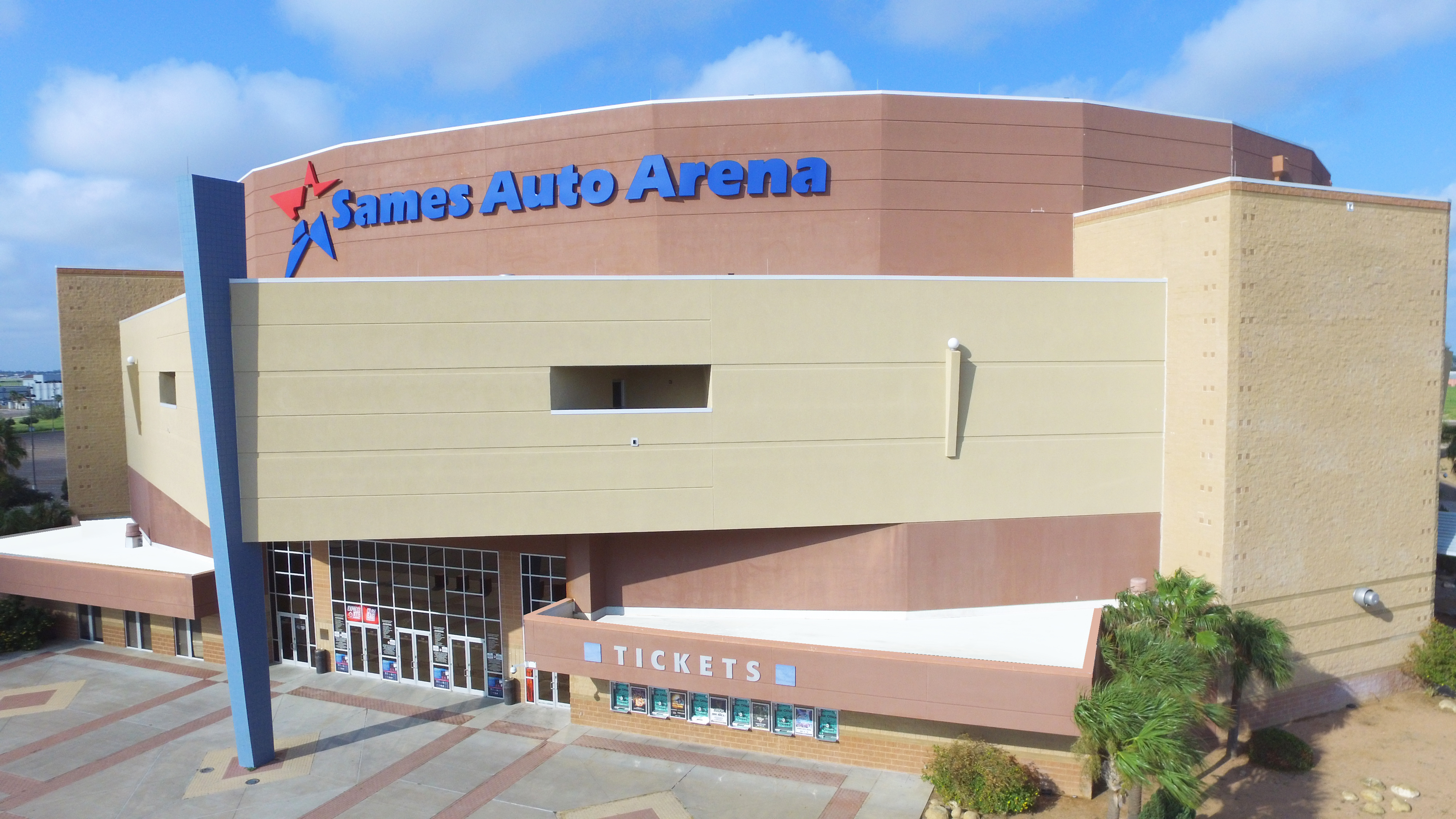
- Interactive map of Sames Auto Arena
- Former names: Laredo Arena (planning/construction); Laredo Entertainment Center (2002–10); Laredo Energy Arena (2010–18)
- Address: 6700 Arena Boulevard
- Location: Laredo, Texas, U.S.
- Coordinates: 27°33′29.70″N 99°27′09.66″W
- Owner: City of Laredo
- Operator: SMG
- Capacity: 8,065

Construction
- Groundbreaking: June 28, 2001
- Opened: October 17, 2002
- Cost: $36.5 million ($66.4 million in 2025 dollars)
- Architects: Lockwood, Andrews & Newnam; Frank Architects Inc.
- General contractors: Beers Construction; Reed Construction

Tenants
- Laredo Bucks (CHL) (2002–12); Laredo Law (af2) (2004); Laredo Lobos (IFL/af2) (2006–07); Laredo Rattlesnakes (LSFL) (2012–13)

Website
- samesautoarena.com

The Sames Auto Arena (formerly known as the Laredo Entertainment Center and Laredo Energy Arena) is a multi-purpose arena in Laredo, Texas. It is located next to Bob Bullock Loop (US 59/Loop 20), on the northeastern side of Laredo. Within the Sames Auto Arena complex, there are several hotels within a walking distance. The Laredo International Airport is also nearby.

== History ==
The City of Laredo funded the $36.5 million project through a one-quarter percent sales tax increase that was approved by Laredo voters on August 12, 2000, with the facility's groundbreaking taking place in June 2001. The facility opened in October 2002. With 32,000 square feet (3,000 m^{2}) of continuous open floor space, the Sames Auto Arena has the largest indoor convention space in South Texas. The 178,000 square foot facility has a seating capacity that can be expanded up to 9,622 for concerts, with 14 luxury suites, six meeting rooms and a private club.

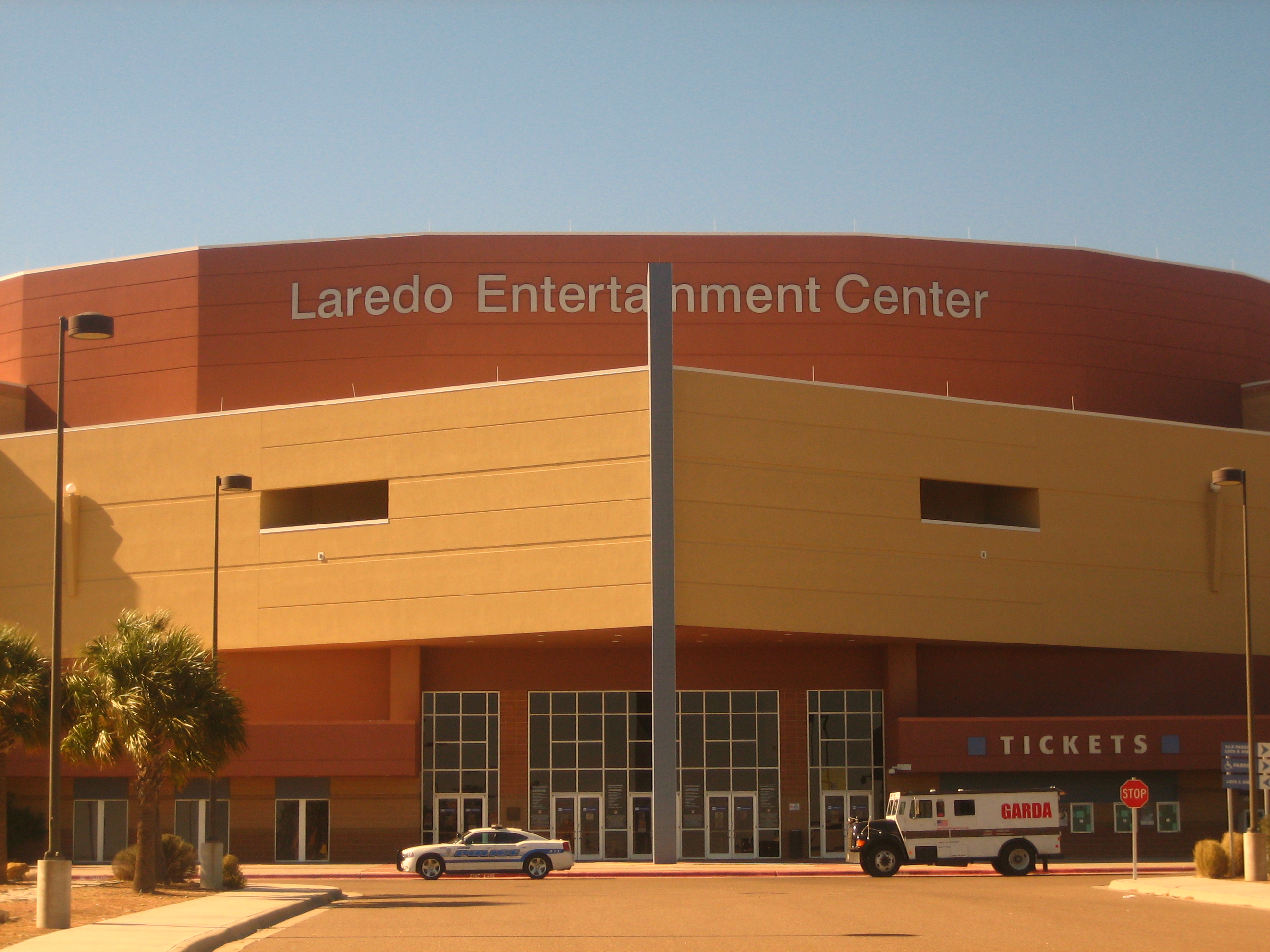
Exterior of venue (c.2008)

The facility's management company, SMG, oversees all aspects of the arena including operations, concessions, scheduling, ticketing, and marketing. The arena sits on 25 acres (10 ha) at Jacaman Road and Bob Bullock Loop (US 59/Loop 20) – property that Arena Ventures donated to the City of Laredo. Arena Ventures owns 35 additional acres around the site that is currently being developed with hotels and office parks, specialized retail stores and restaurants, and a $1.5 million water feature with fountains, a boardwalk and quarter-mile jogging track.

In 2010, the previously-named Laredo Entertainment Center was renamed the Laredo Energy Arena after Laredo Energy purchased the venue's naming rights. Eight years later, Sames Auto Group purchased the naming rights to the arena and the venue is now known as the Sames Auto Arena.

Naming history

- Laredo Entertainment Center (October 17, 2002—March 16, 2010)
- Laredo Energy Arena (March 17, 2010—July 16, 2018)
- Sames Auto Arena (July 17, 2018—present)

== Gallery ==
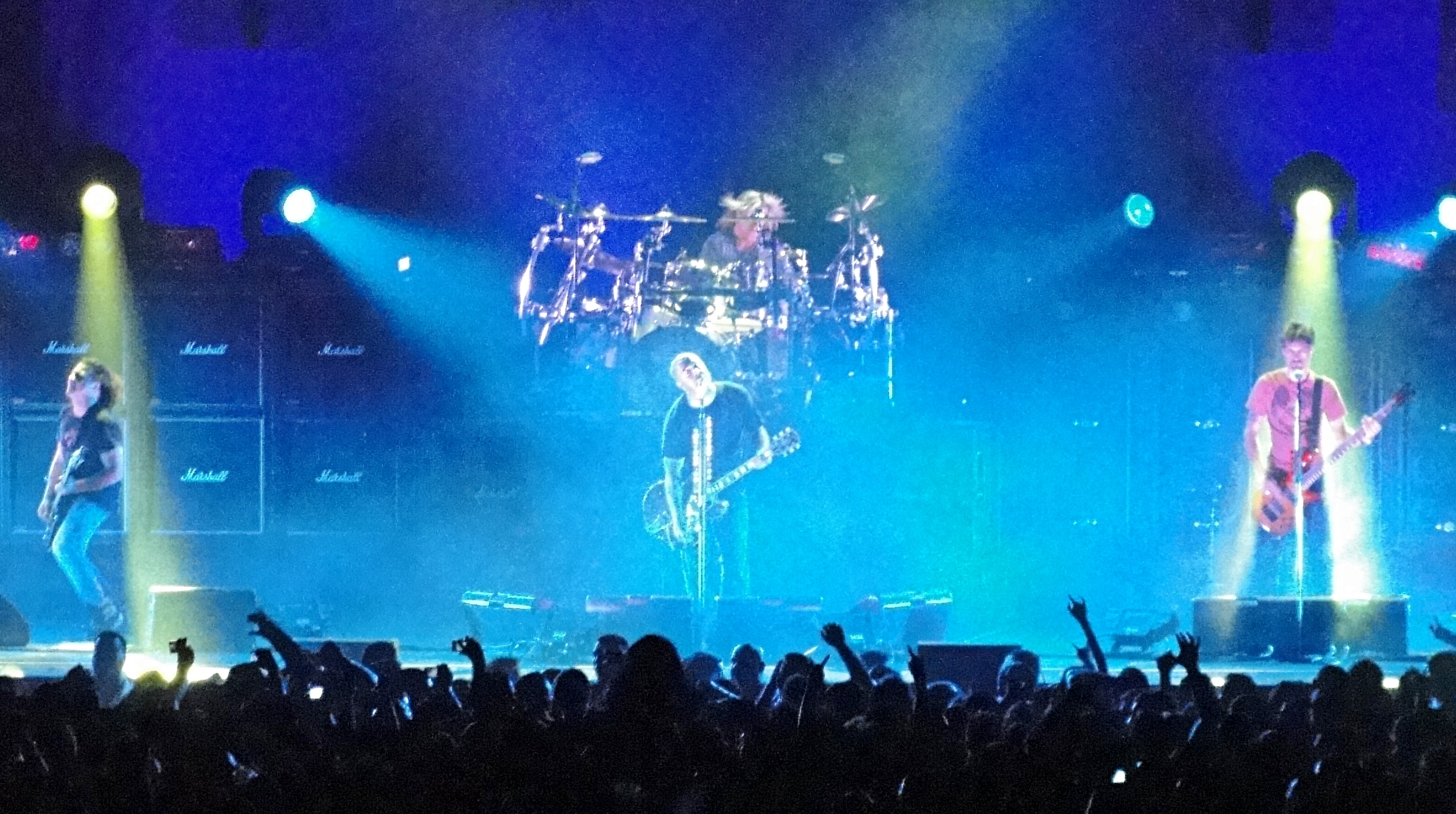
Staind performing at the LEC

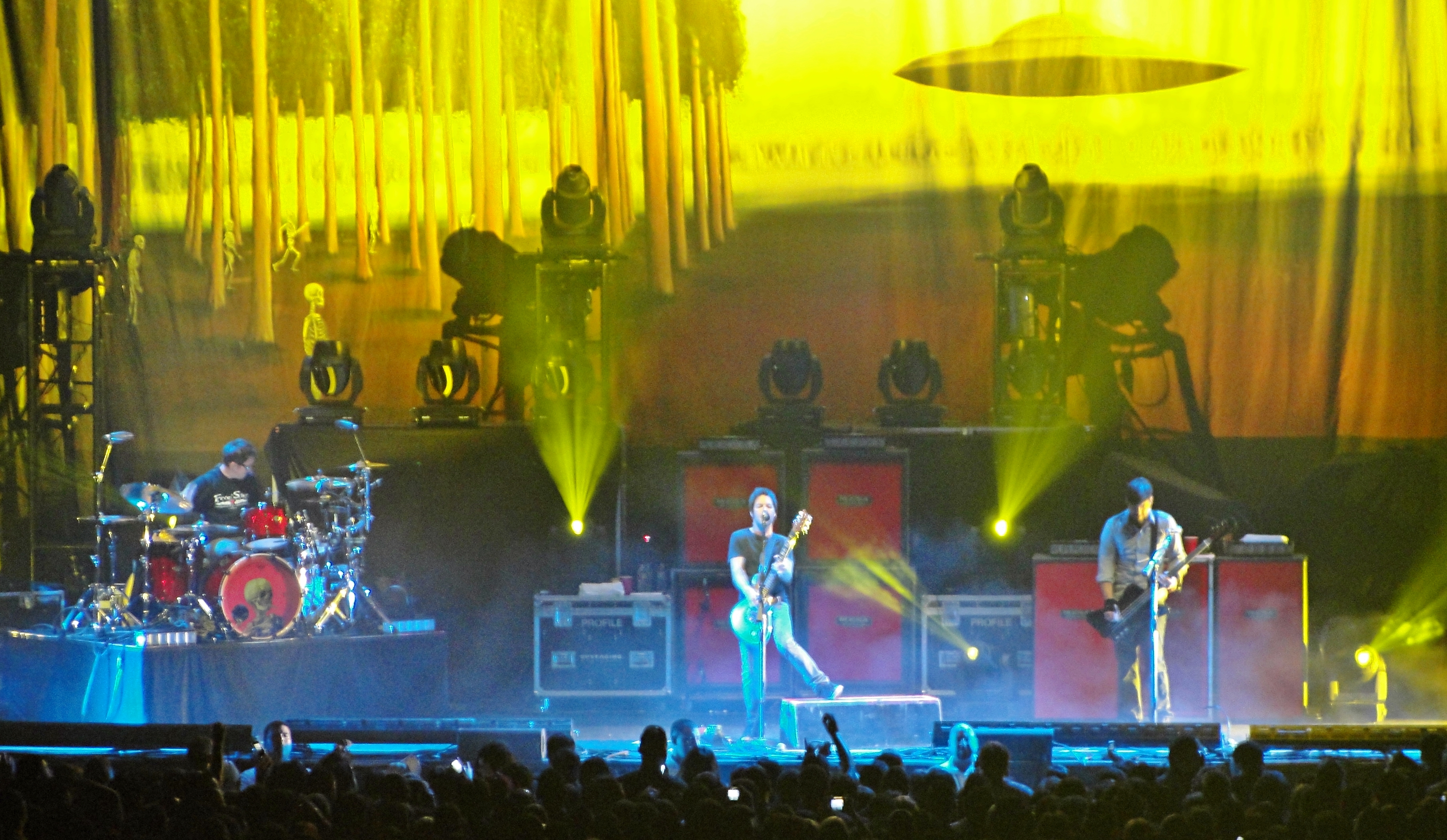
Chevelle performing at the LEC

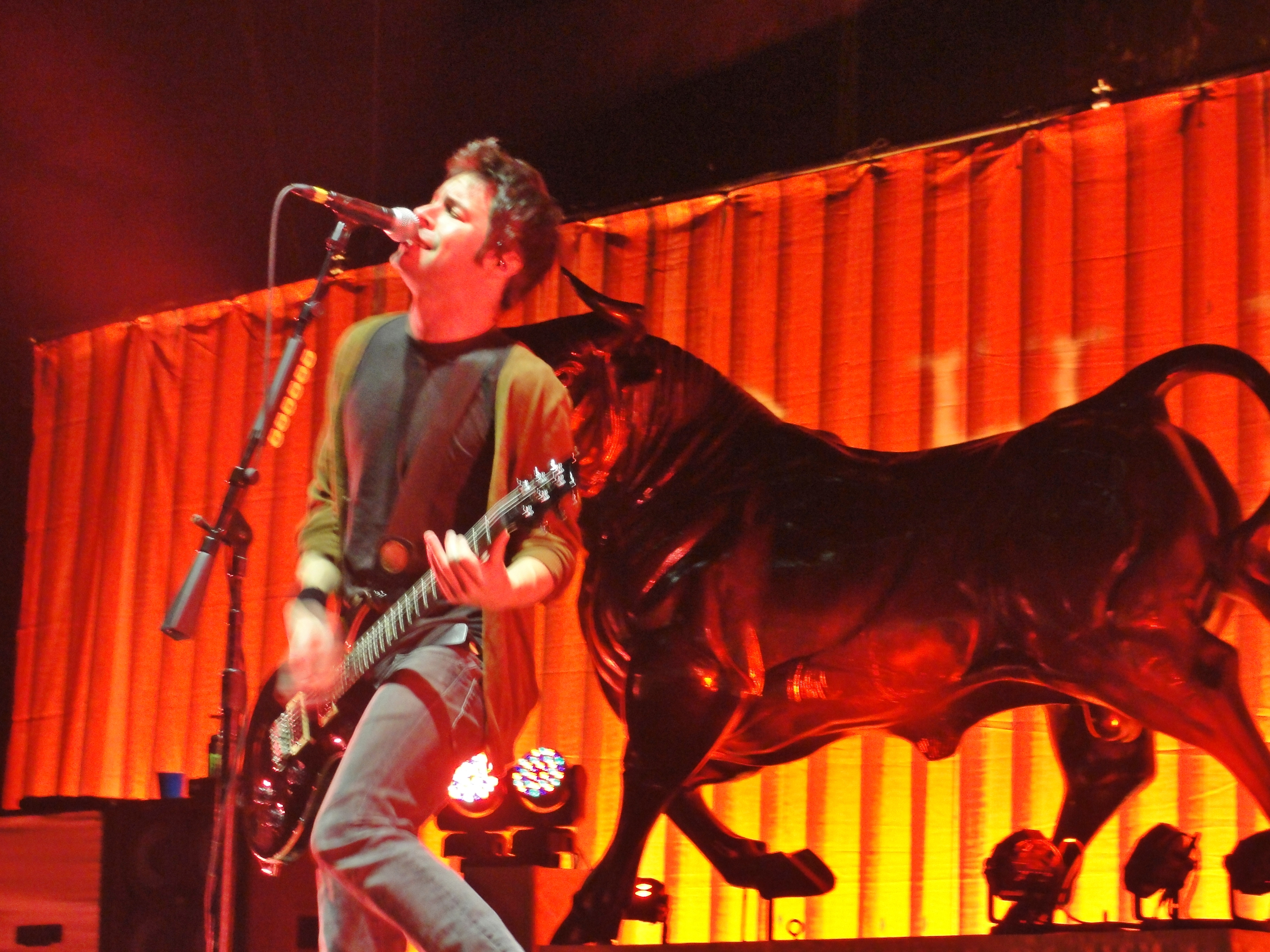
Pete Loeffler of Chevelle performing at the Carnival of Madness tour 2012

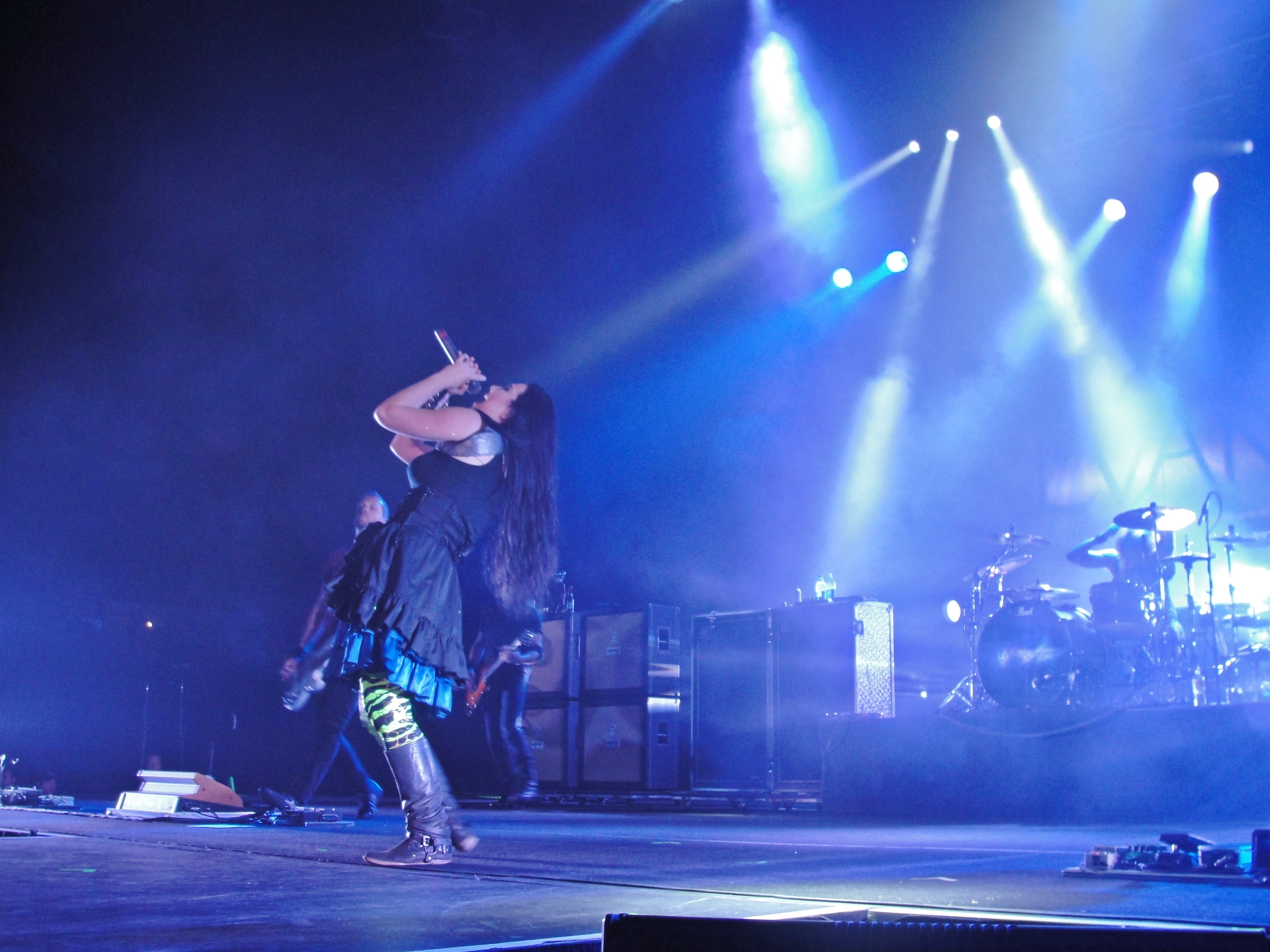
Amy Lee of Evanescence

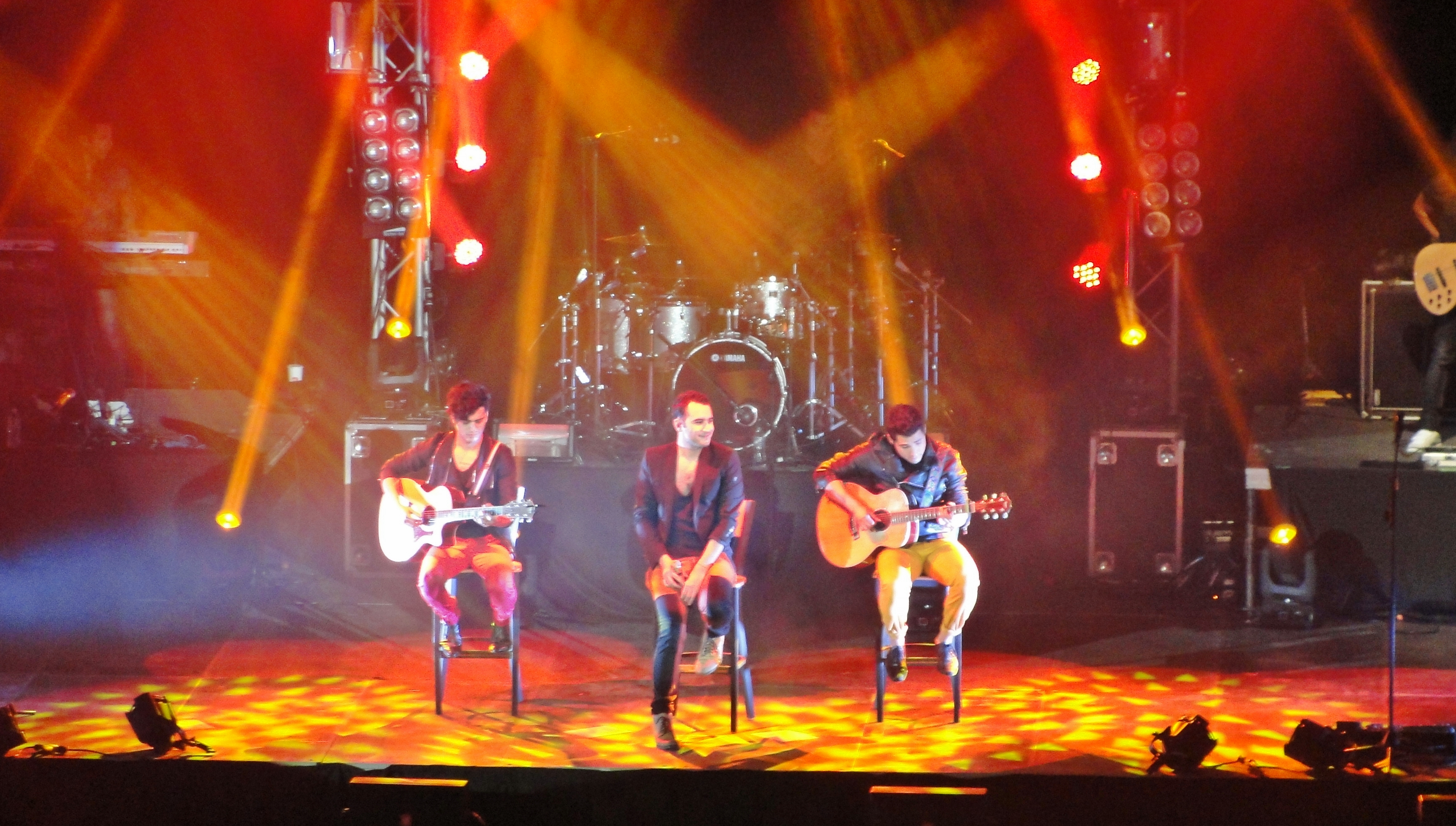
Reik "Peligro" tour

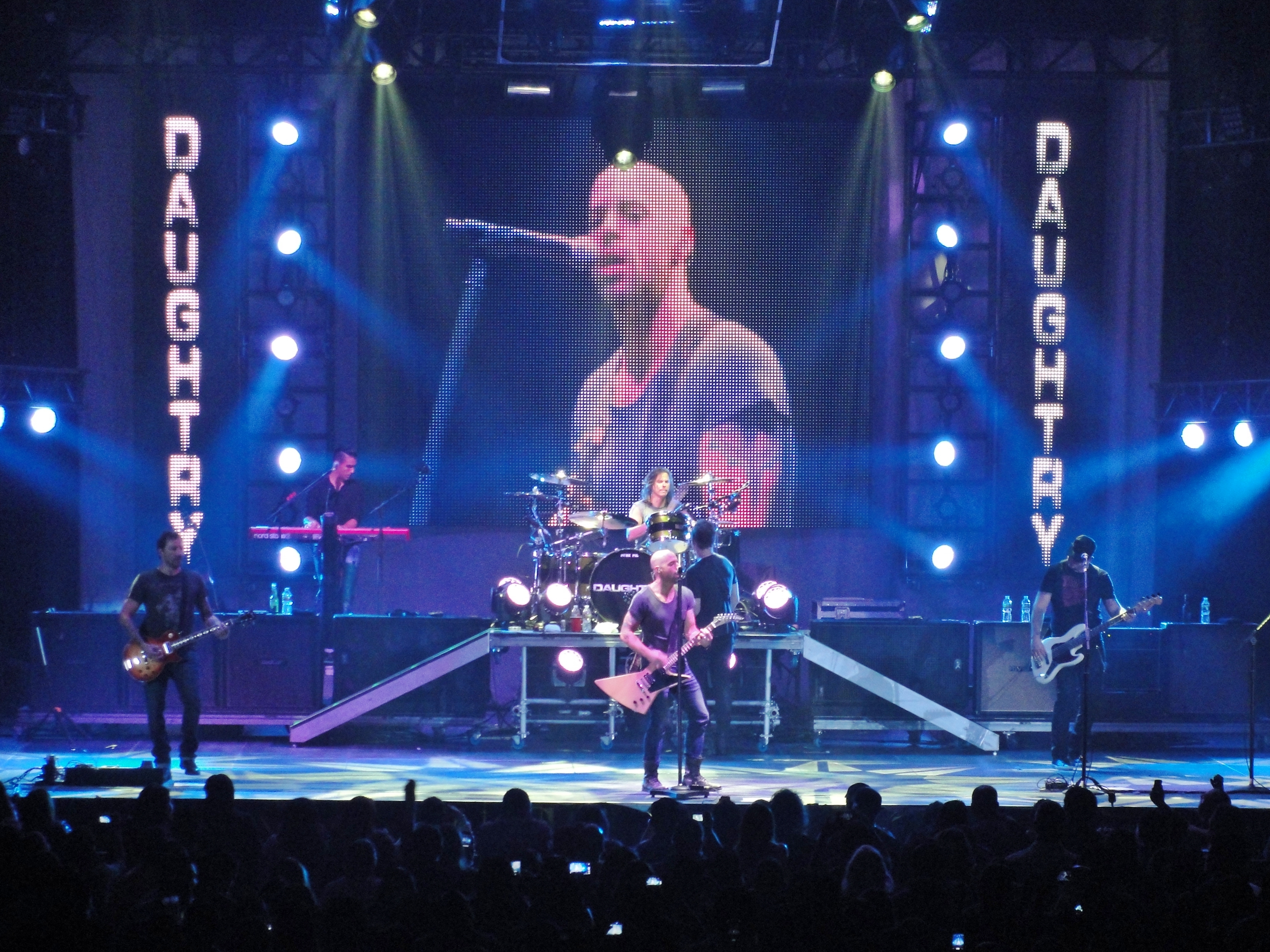
Daughtry live in 2012

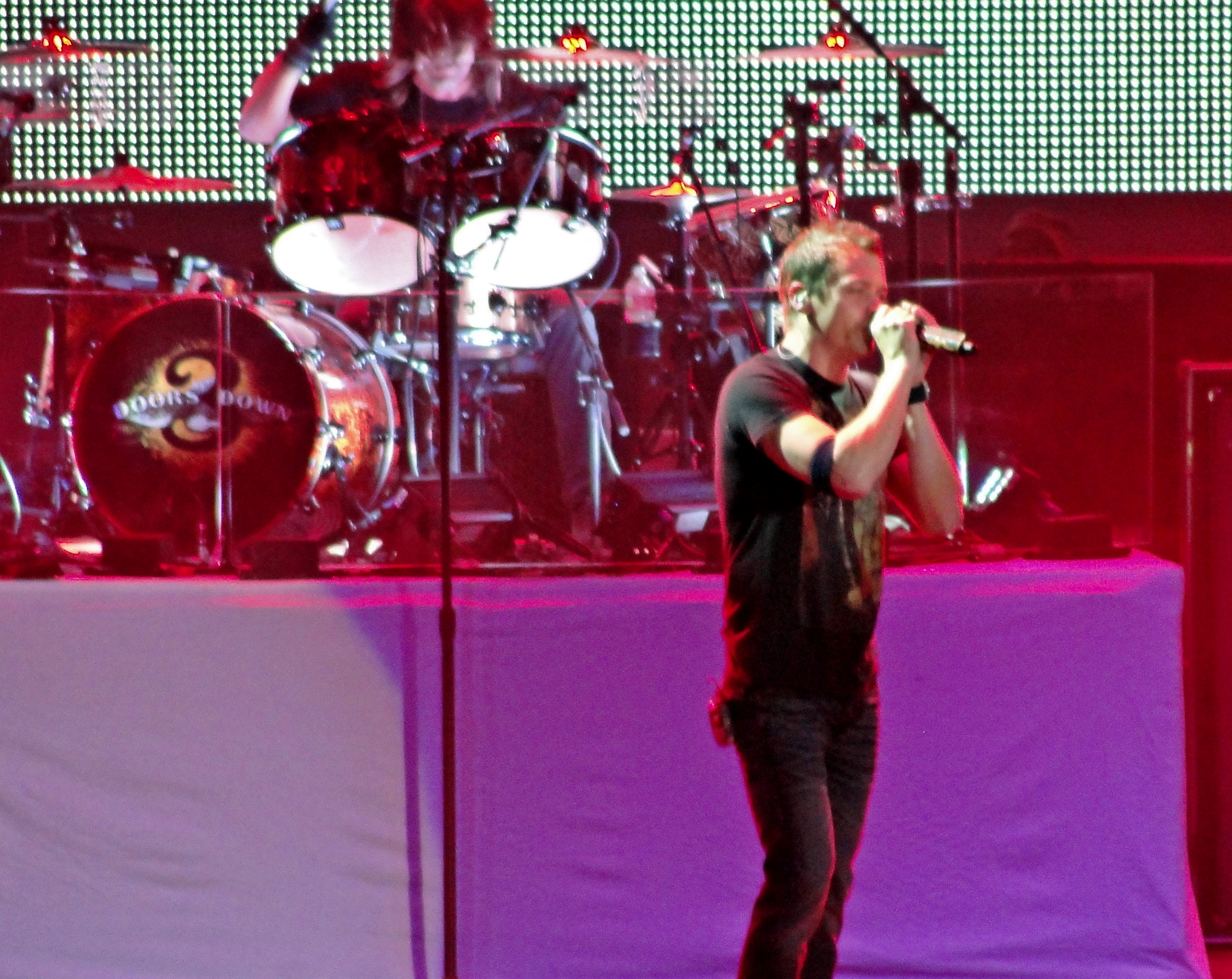
3 Doors Down

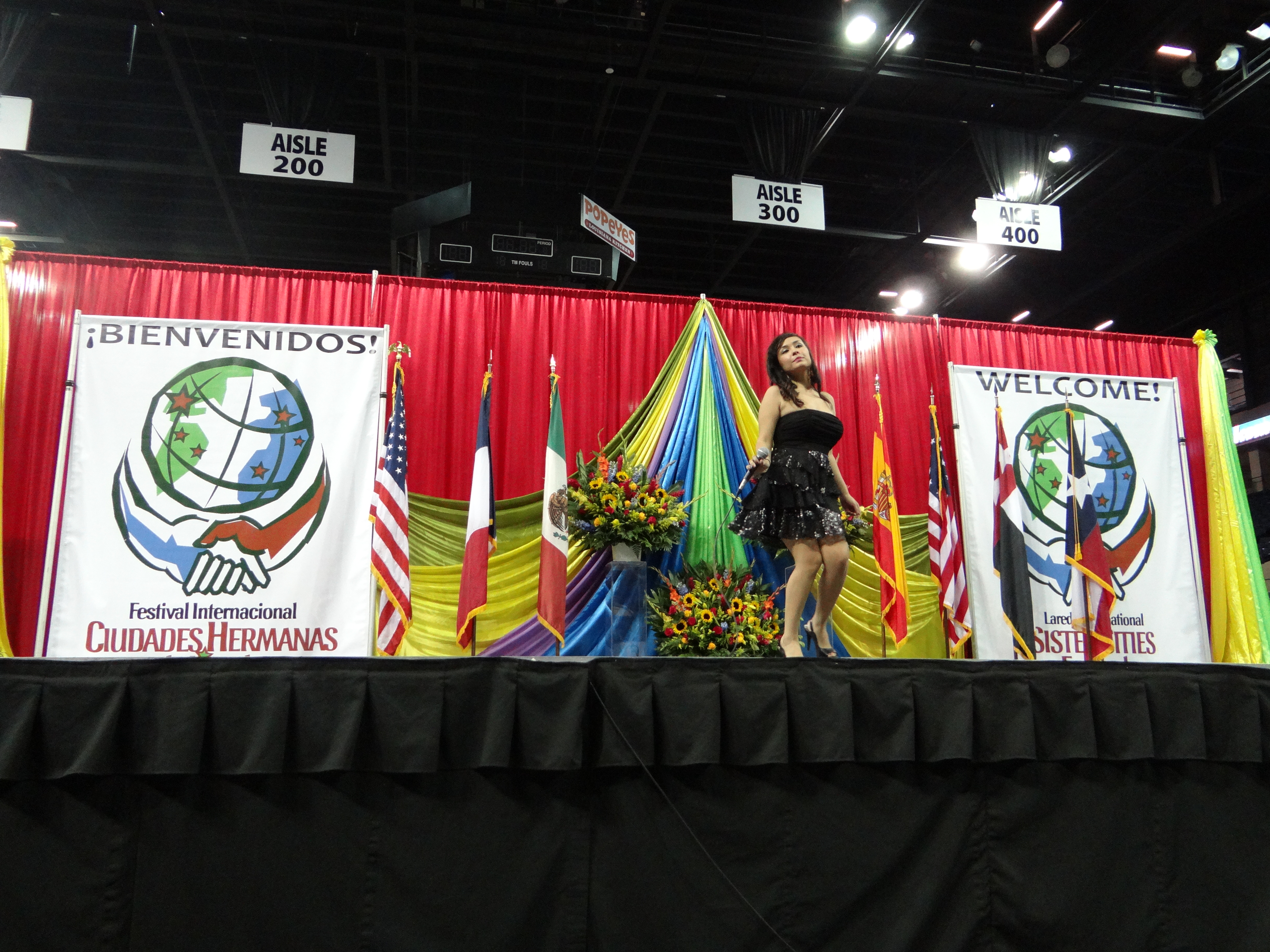
Phoebe Marie performing at the Laredo Energy Arena for the Sister Cities Festival

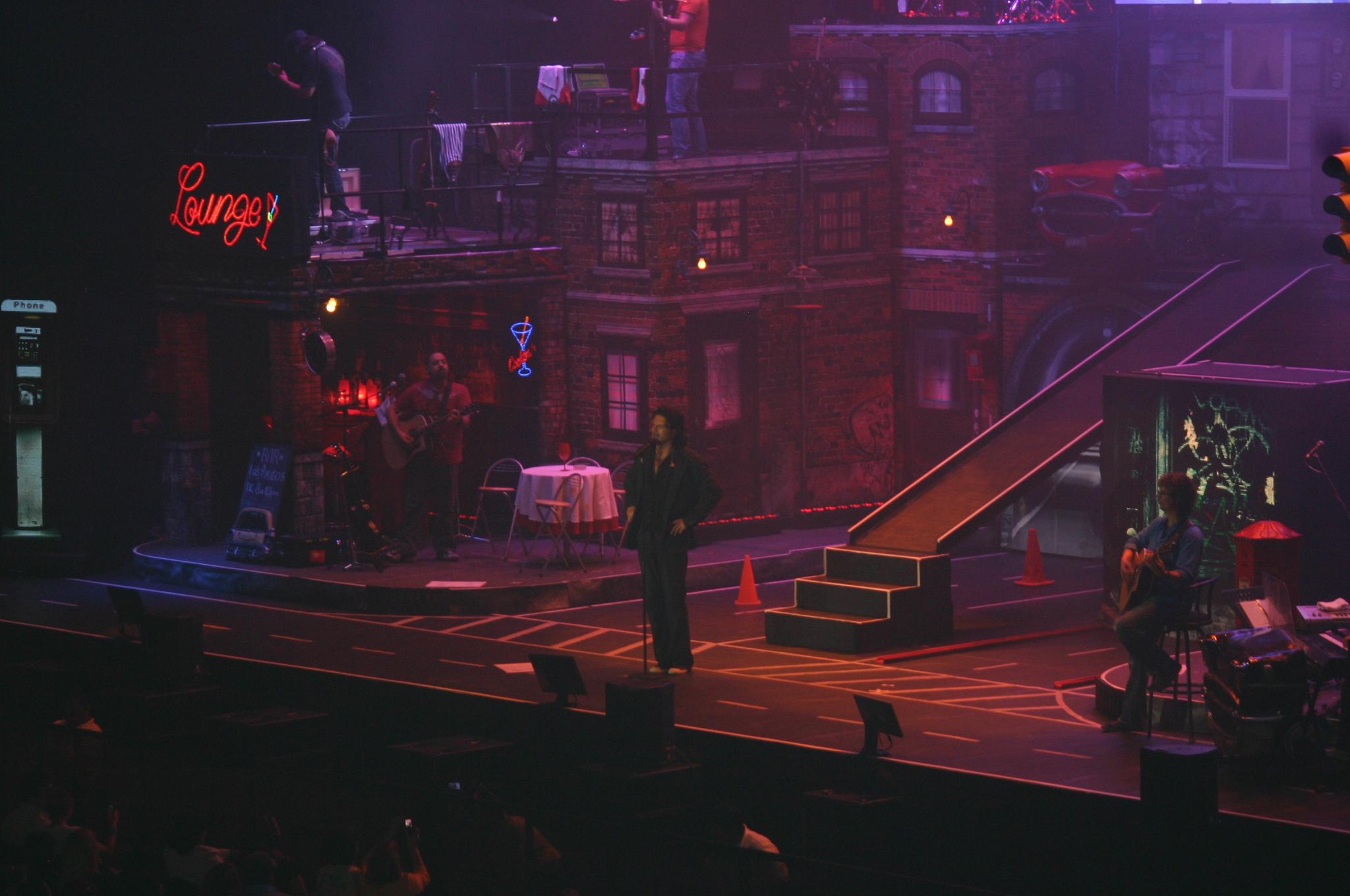
Ricardo Arjona performing in the LEC

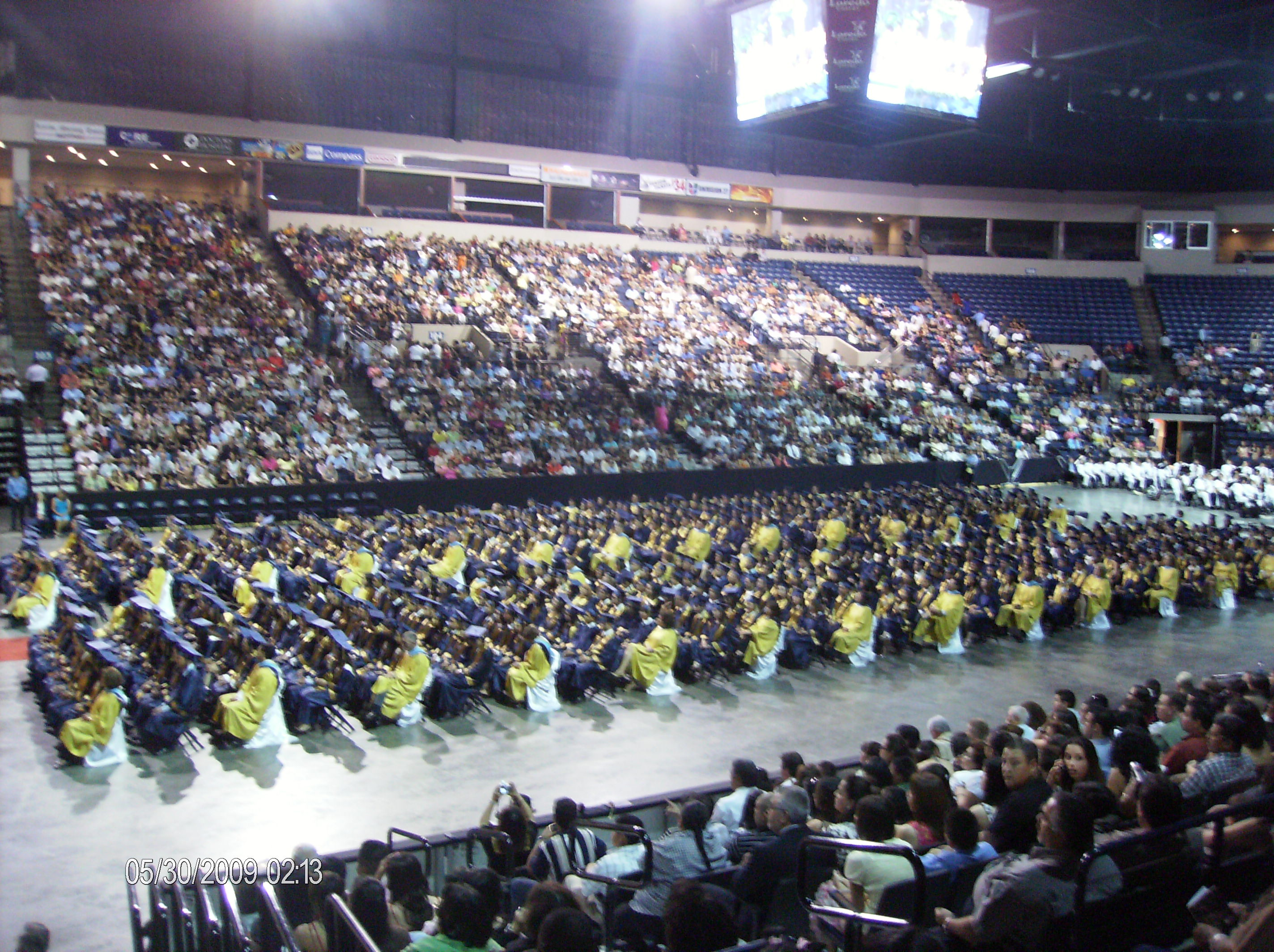
John B. Alexander High School 2009 Graduation in the LEC
