= Frisco Falcons =

- Founded: 2011
- League: Lone Star Football League
- Based in: Frisco, Texas
- Arena: Dr Pepper Arena
- Colors: Teal, Vegas Gold, Black
- Owner: Deryek Lewis

The Frisco Falcons was a planned professional indoor football team in the Lone Star Football League that was scheduled to begin play for the league's inaugural 2012 season. Based in Frisco, Texas, the Falcons would have played their home games at the Dr Pepper Arena. While announced in August 2011 as a charter member of the league, the team collapsed before the 2012 schedule was released in December 2011.

The Falcons were to be the second indoor/arena football team based in Frisco, following the Frisco Thunder of the Intense Football League which played the 2007 and 2008 seasons before folding. The Dallas Vigilantes of the Arena Football League were originally set to play in Frisco, but ended up playing at the American Airlines Center instead.
