= Merrell Center =

Arena in Katy, Texas

Leonard E. Merrell Center
- Merrell Center
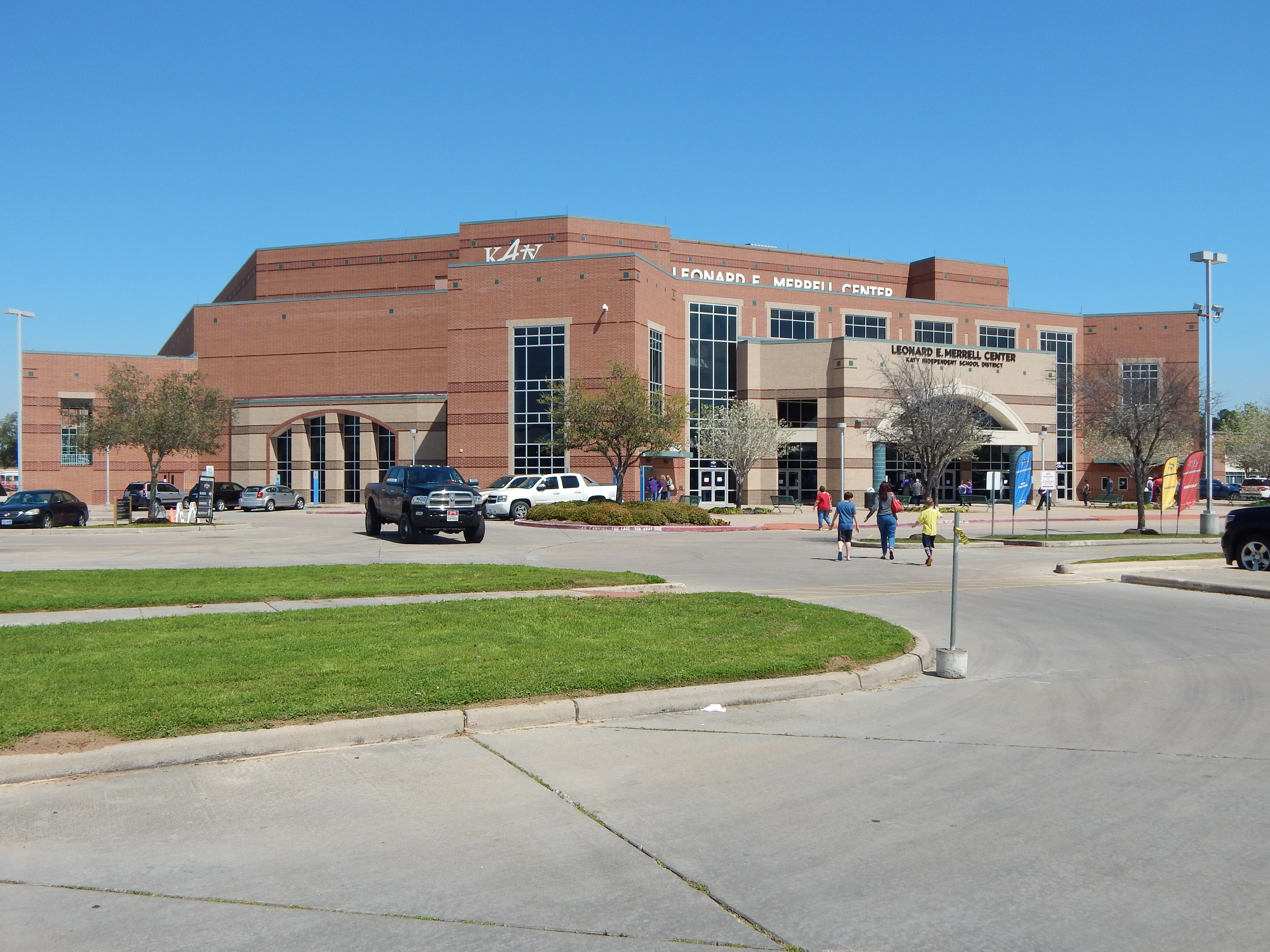
- Interactive map of Leonard E. Merrell Center
- Location: 6301 South Stadium Lane, Katy, Texas 77494
- Coordinates: 29°46′49″N 95°49′56″W
- Owner: Katy Independent School District
- Operator: Katy Independent School District
- Capacity: 7,200 (Concerts); 5,794 (Basketball); 4,290 (Telescoping seats retracted)

Construction
- Groundbreaking: June 2003
- Opened: March 2005
- Cost: $ 18.9 Million
- Architect: PBK Architects

Tenants
- Katy Copperheads (NIFL) (2006); Katy Ruff Riders (Intense) (2007–2008); Houston Stallions (SIFL/LSFL) (2011–2012); Southland Conference basketball tournaments (NCAA) (2008–2022)

The Leonard E. Merrell Center (commonly known as the Merrell Center) is a 7,200-seat multi-purpose arena in Katy, Texas. It was built in 2005 and was the former home of the Katy Copperheads (National Indoor Football League) and the Katy Ruff Riders of the Intense Football League. The Merrell Center has hosted the Southland Conference Men's and Women's Basketball Tournaments from 2008 to 2022, but both tournaments will move to The Legacy Center on the campus of McNeese State University in Lake Charles, Louisiana in 2023. The Houston Stallions of the Lone Star Football League moved to the Merrell Center in 2011.

As a concert venue the arena seats 1,500 for theater shows and up to 7,200 for arena concerts. Capacity for athletic events is 5,794. The arena can seat up to 1,200 for banquets. The arena contains a 21,600-square-foot (120' by 180') arena floor, big enough for small trade shows, a 3,000-square-foot (280 m^{2}) meeting room that can be divisible into three smaller rooms, and a 6,300-square-foot (590 m^{2}) lobby. The arena is also used for commencement ceremonies and high school basketball.

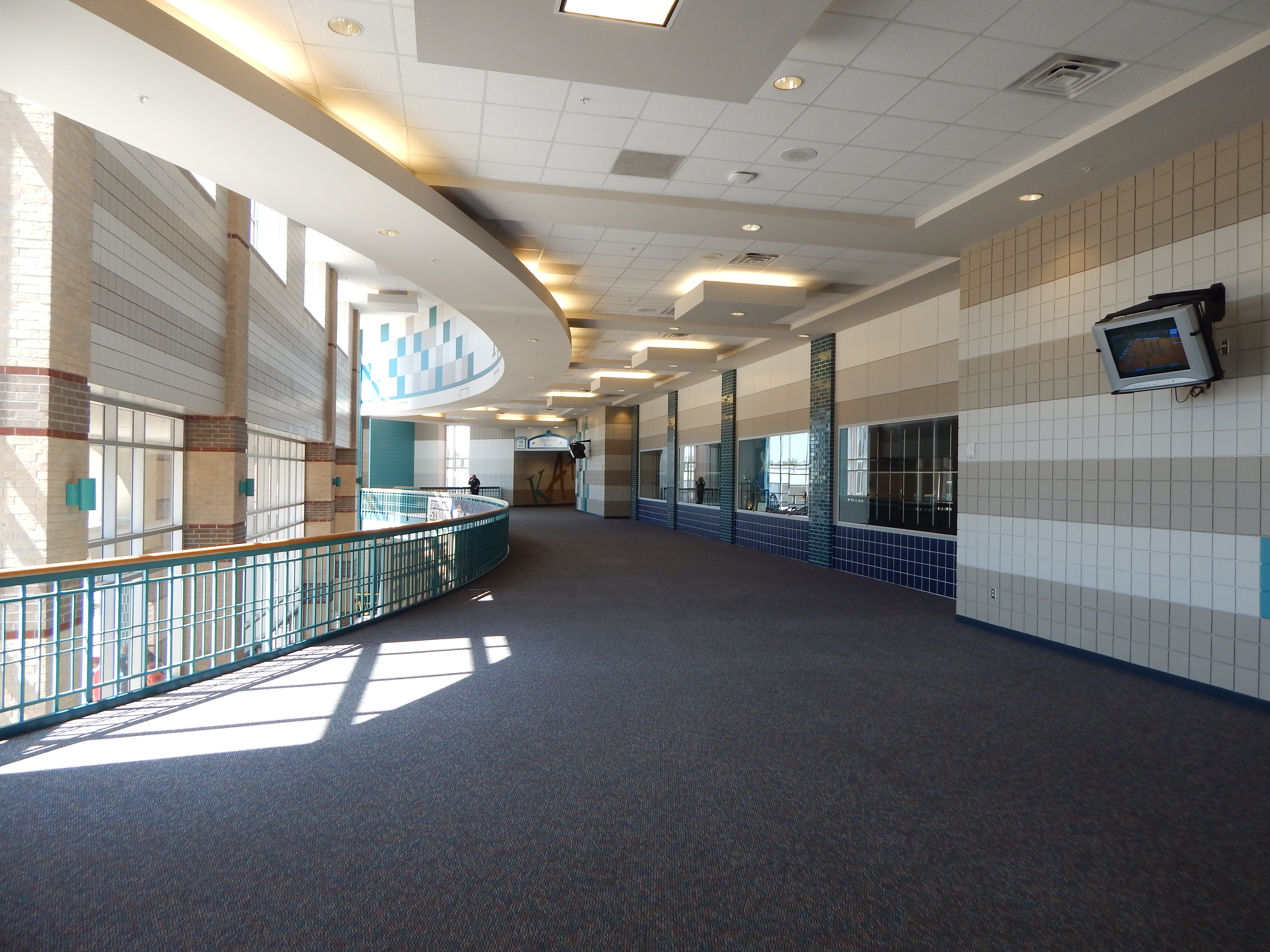
Second Level Foyer - Merrell Center

Adjacent to the Merrell Center is the Katy ISD L. D. Robinson Pavilion & Rodeo Arena.
