= Harlingen Consolidated Independent School District =

School district in Texas, United States

Address
- 407 N 77 Sunshine Strip Harlingen, Texas, 78550; United States

District information
- Grades: PK–12
- Schools: 31
- NCES District ID: 4822530

Students and staff
- Students: 17,037 (2021–22)
- Teachers: 1,199.06 (FTE)
- Student–teacher ratio: 14.21

The Harlingen Consolidated Independent School District (HCISD) is a school district headquartered in Harlingen, Texas, United States. It was founded August 5, 1950, via the merger of the Harlingen Independent School District and the Stuart Place Independent School District.

HCISD serves most of the city of Harlingen, part of the city of San Benito, the city of Palm Valley, the towns of Combes and Primera, and portions of unincorporated Cameron County, including Juarez, Las Palmas, and Lasana.

HCISD has its own TV station locally broadcast in Harlingen on cable provided by Charter Spectrum of the Rio Grande Valley. KHGN-TV is used to inform parents and students of updates involving Harlingen and its schools. Also aired on KHGN is Harlingen High School's Cardinal News and Nonsense and Harlingen High School South's Southern Scoop.

The HCISD district office and KHGN-TV Channel 17 station are located at 407 N. 77 Sunshine Strip in Harlingen.

In 2009, the school district was rated "academically acceptable" by the Texas Education Agency.

In 2018, Dishman Elementary was named a Blue Ribbon School by U.S. Department of Education.

== Controversy ==
In July 2024, the ACLU of Texas sent HCISD a letter, arguing that HCISD's 2023-2024 dress and grooming code appeared to violate the Texas Creating a Respectful and Open World for Natural Hair (or CROWN) Act, which prohibits racial discrimination based on hairstyles or hair texture and which took effect in September 2023, and asking the district to revise its policies for the 2024–2025 school year.

== Schools ==
=== High schools (Grades 8, 9–12) ===
- Harlingen High School (established 1913; mascot: Cardinal; serves 10th-12th grade)
- Harlingen High School South (established 1993; mascot: Hawk; serves 10th-12th grade)
- Harlingen Collegiate High School (Harlingen)
- Early College High School (established 2007; mascot: Owl; serves 9th-12th grade)
- Cano Ninth Grade Academy (established 2013; mascot: Raven; serves 9th grade)
- Harlingen School of Health Professions (established 2014; mascot: Phoenix; serves 8th-12th grade)

=== Middle schools (Grades 6–8) ===
- Coakley Middle School
- Gutierrez Middle School of Arts & Sciences
- Memorial Middle School
- Vela Middle School
- Vernon Middle School World Languages Academy
- STEM2 Preparatory Academy

=== Elementary schools (Grades PK–5) ===
- Austin Elementary IB World School
- Ben Milam Elementary Dual Language Academy
- Bonham Elementary
- Bowie Elementary
- Crockett Elementary
- Dishman Elementary
- Dr. Rodriguez Elementary STEM Academy
- Early Childhood Academy
- Jefferson Elementary
- Lamar Elementary Dual Language Academy
- Lee Means Elementary Fine Arts Academy
- Long Elementary
- Sam Houston Elementary IB World School
- Stuart Place Elementary
- Travis Elementary STEM Academy
- Treasure Hills Elementary
- Wilson Elementary Dual Language Academy
- Zavala Elementary

=== Other campuses ===
- KEYS Academy
- Secondary Alternative Center
