= Primera, Texas =

- Town
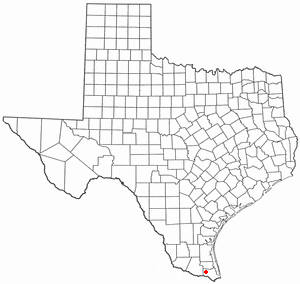
- Location of Primera, Texas

- Coordinates: 26°13′23″N 97°45′5″W
- Country: United States
- State: Texas
- County: Cameron

Area
  - Total: 2.78 sq mi (7.19 km^{2})
  - Land: 2.78 sq mi (7.19 km^{2})
  - Water: 0 sq mi (0.00 km^{2})
- Elevation: 43 ft (13 m)

Population (2020)
  - Total: 5,257
  - Density: 1,890/sq mi (731/km^{2})
- Time zone: UTC-6 (Central (CST))
  - Summer (DST): UTC-5 (CDT)
- ZIP code: 78550
- Area code: 956
- FIPS code: 48-59540
- GNIS feature ID: 1344565
- Website: primeratx.gov

Primera is a town in Cameron County, Texas, United States, near Combes. The population was 5,257 at the 2020 census, up from 4,070 at the 2010 census. It is part of the Brownsville–Harlingen–Raymondville and the Matamoros–Brownsville metropolitan areas.

== Geography ==
Primera is located in western Cameron County at 26°13′23″N 97°45′5″W (26.223152, –97.751470). It is 3 miles (5 km) northwest of the center of Harlingen.

According to the United States Census Bureau, the town has a total area of 2.6 square miles (6.8 km^{2}), all land.

== Demographics ==
Historical population
Census	Pop.	Note	%±
1960	1,066		—
1970	902		−15.4%
1980	1,380		53.0%
1990	2,030		47.1%
2000	2,723		34.1%
2010	4,070		49.5%
2020	5,257		29.2%
U.S. Decennial Census

=== 2020 census ===
Primera racial composition (NH = Non-Hispanic) (Note: Note: the US Census treats Hispanic/Latino as an ethnic category. This table excludes Latinos from the racial categories and assigns them to a separate category. Hispanics/Latinos can be of any race.)
Race	Number	Percentage
White (NH)	442	8.41%
Black or African American (NH)	13	0.25%
Native American or Alaska Native (NH)	7	0.13%
Asian (NH)	13	0.25%
Pacific Islander (NH)	4	0.08%
Some Other Race (NH)	19	0.36%
Mixed/Multi-Racial (NH)	23	0.44%
Hispanic or Latino	4,736	90.09%
Total	5,257	

As of the 2020 United States census, there were 5,257 people, 1,537 households, and 1,165 families residing in the town.

=== 2000 census ===
As of the census of 2000, there were 2,723 people, 735 households, and 659 families residing in the town. The population density was 1,772.4 people per square mile (684.3 people/km^{2}). There were 780 housing units at an average density of 507.7 per square mile (196.0/km^{2}). The racial makeup of the town was 81.60% White, 0.66% African American, 0.44% Native American, 0.04% Asian, 0.04% Pacific Islander, 14.03% from other races, and 3.20% from two or more races. Hispanic or Latino of any race were 89.57% of the population.

There were 735 households, out of which 54.4% had children under the age of 18 living with them, 69.4% were married couples living together, 15.4% had a female householder with no husband present, and 10.3% were non-families. 8.8% of all households were made up of individuals, and 4.2% had someone living alone who was 65 years of age or older. The average household size was 3.70 and the average family size was 3.90.

In the town, the population was spread out, with 36.2% under the age of 18, 11.1% from 18 to 24, 28.8% from 25 to 44, 17.4% from 45 to 64, and 6.5% who were 65 years of age or older. The median age was 27 years. For every 100 females, there were 99.2 males. For every 100 females age 18 and over, there were 88.6 males.

The median income for a household in the town was $26,841, and the median income for a family was $27,292. Males had a median income of $19,167 versus $16,667 for females. The per capita income for the town was $8,897. About 28.8% of families and 29.9% of the population were below the poverty line, including 37.2% of those under age 18 and 33.2% of those age 65 or over.

== Education ==
Primera is within the Harlingen Consolidated Independent School District.

Primera has one elementary school, Wilson Elementary School.

In addition, South Texas Independent School District operates magnet schools that serve the community.
