= Laredo Lobos =

Arena football team

Logo

General information
- Founded: 2005
- Folded: 2007
- Headquartered: Laredo Entertainment Center in Laredo, Texas
- Colors: Blue, red, silver, white

Team history
- Laredo Lobos (2006–2007)

Home fields
- Laredo Entertainment Center (2006–2007)

League / conference affiliations
- Intense Football League (2006) af2 (2007): National Conference (2007); Southwest Division (2007)

The Laredo Lobos were a professional arena football team based out of Laredo, Texas. They were a member of the af2 league. They played their home games at the Laredo Entertainment Center. The team was originally a 2006 expansion member of the Intense Football League.

The Lobos mark the af2's return to the city after the recent failure of the Laredo Law.

However, after getting only 1 win in 2007, along with only 3 wins in two years, the Lobos joined the Law as Laredo's two failed indoor football projects and folded.

== Season-by-season ==
Season records
Season	W	L	T	Finish	Playoff results
Laredo Lobos (Intense Football League)
2006	2	12	0	6th League	--
Laredo Lobos (af2)
2007	1	15	0	5th NC Southwest	--
Totals	3	27	0		
