= Las Palmas II, Texas =

Las Palmas II
- Census-designated place
- Location within the state of Texas
- Coordinates: 26°12′12″N 97°44′23″W
- Country: United States
- State: Texas
- County: Cameron

Area
  - Total: 0.31 sq mi (0.79 km^{2})
  - Land: 0.30 sq mi (0.78 km^{2})
  - Water: 0.0039 sq mi (0.01 km^{2})
- Elevation: 45 ft (14 m)

Population (2020)
  - Total: 891
  - Density: 3,000/sq mi (1,100/km^{2})
- Time zone: UTC-6 (Central (CST))
  - Summer (DST): UTC-5 (CDT)
- FIPS code: 48-41580

Las Palmas II is a census-designated place (CDP) in Cameron County, in the U.S. state of Texas. (The "II" distinguishes the CDP from Las Palmas, a CDP in Zapata County.) As of the 2020 census, Las Palmas II had a population of 891. Prior to the 2010 census, the community was part of the Las Palmas-Juarez CDP. It is part of the Brownsville–Harlingen Metropolitan Statistical Area.

== Geography ==
Las Palmas is in western Cameron County, bordered to the north by Harlingen and to the east by Juarez.

According to the United States Census Bureau, the Las Palmas II CDP has a total area of 0.31 square miles (0.79 km^{2}), of which 0.30 square miles (0.78 km^{2}) is land and 0.004 square miles (0.01 km^{2}), or 0.94%, is water.

== Demographics ==
Historical population
Census	Pop.	Note	%±
2010	1,605		—
2020	891		−44.5%
U.S. Decennial Census; 1850–1900 1910; 1920 1930 1940; 1950 1960 1970; 1980 1990 2000; 2010 2020

Las Palmas II first appeared as a census designated place in the 2010 U.S. census after the Las Palmas-Juarez CDP was split into the Las Palmas II and Juarez CDPs.

=== 2020 census ===
Las Palmas II CDP, Texas – Racial and ethnic composition Note: the US Census treats Hispanic/Latino as an ethnic category. This table excludes Latinos from the racial categories and assigns them to a separate category. Hispanics/Latinos may be of any race.
Race / Ethnicity (NH = Non-Hispanic)	Pop 2010	Pop 2020	% 2010	% 2020
White alone (NH)	77	20	4.80%	2.24%
Black or African American alone (NH)	0	0	0.00%	0.00%
Native American or Alaska Native alone (NH)	0	2	0.00%	0.22%
Asian alone (NH)	4	0	0.25%	0.00%
Native Hawaiian or Pacific Islander alone (NH)	0	0	0.00%	0.00%
Other race alone (NH)	0	4	0.00%	0.45%
Mixed race or Multiracial (NH)	0	3	0.00%	0.34%
Hispanic or Latino (any race)	1,524	862	94.95%	96.75%
Total	1,605	891	100.00%	100.00%
