= Laredo Law =

Arena football team

Logo

General information
- Founded: 2003
- Folded: 2004
- Headquartered: Laredo Entertainment Center in Laredo, Texas
- Colors: Black, red, tan, white

Personnel
- Head coach: Scott Maynard

Team history
- Laredo Law (2004)

Home fields
- Laredo Entertainment Center (2004)

League / conference affiliations
- af2 (2004): National Conference (2004); Southwestern Division (2004)

The Laredo Law was a 2004 af2 expansion team, the minor league for the Arena Football League. They played their home games at the Laredo Entertainment Center in Laredo, Texas. They only played for one season (for a 3-13 record) before ceasing all operations at the end of the season.

The team's head coach was Scott Maynard, son of Don Maynard, who starred for the New York Jets as wide receiver and is a member of the Pro Football Hall of Fame.

Arena Football would not return to Laredo, Texas until 2006, when the Laredo Lobos were formed for the Intense Football League. Now, the Lobos are in the AF2.

== Season-by-season ==
Season records
Season	W	L	T	Finish	Playoff results
2004	3	13	0	5th NC Southwestern	--

== Roster ==
- 1 Roque Vela
- 2 Traco Rachal
- 3 Terrance Minor
- 4 Marc Saldana
- 4 Rich Lucero
- 5 James Dawson
- 7 P.J. Winston
- 8 Julius Brown
- 10 Michael Wakefield
- 11 Trey Merkens
- 13 Brian Hegneur
- 14 Greg Bell
- 17 Rocky Perez
- 19 Bjay Jones
- 22 Melvin Phillips
- 25 Torrey Prather
- 34 Rod Kelly
- 55 Ariel Famaligi
- 70 Michael Patterson
- 73 Steve Mascorro
- 81 Mike Jones
- 92 Juwan Jackson
- 95 John Amarro
- Head Coach: Scott Maynard
- OL/DL Coach: Jim Beverly
- Defensive Coordinator: Stan Petry
- Special Teams: Coach Mark Soto
- Trainer: Bobby Moore Jr.
