= Juarez, Texas =

- Census-designated place
- Location within the state of Texas
- Coordinates: 26°12′7″N 97°43′52″W
- Country: United States
- State: Texas
- County: Cameron

Area
  - Total: 0.19 sq mi (0.5 km^{2})
  - Land: 0.19 sq mi (0.5 km^{2})
  - Water: 0 sq mi (0 km^{2})
- Elevation: 40 ft (12 m)

Population (2010)
  - Total: 1,017
  - Density: 5,142/sq mi (1,985.5/km^{2})
- Time zone: UTC-6 (Central (CST))
  - Summer (DST): UTC-5 (CDT)
- FIPS code: 48-38168

Juarez is a census-designated place (CDP) in Cameron County, in the U.S. state of Texas. As of the 2020 census, Juarez had a population of 642. Prior to the 2010 census, the community was part of the Las Palmas-Juarez CDP. It is part of the Brownsville–Harlingen Metropolitan Statistical Area.

== Geography ==
Juarez is in western Cameron County, bordered to the north and east by Harlingen and to the west by Las Palmas.

According to the United States Census Bureau, the Juarez CDP has a total area of 0.2 square miles (0.5 km^{2}), all land.

== Demographics ==
Historical population
Census	Pop.	Note	%±
2010	1,017		—
2020	642		−36.9%
U.S. Decennial Census; 1850–1900 1910; 1920 1930 1940; 1950 1960 1970; 1980 1990 2000; 2010 2020

Juarez first appeared as a census designated place in the 2010 U.S. census after the Las Palmas-Juarez CDP was split into the Juarez and Las Palmas II CDPs.

=== 2020 census ===
Juarez CDP, Texas – Racial and ethnic composition Note: the US Census treats Hispanic/Latino as an ethnic category. This table excludes Latinos from the racial categories and assigns them to a separate category. Hispanics/Latinos may be of any race.
Race / Ethnicity (NH = Non-Hispanic)	Pop 2010	Pop 2020	% 2010	% 2020
White alone (NH)	30	24	2.95%	3.74%
Black or African American alone (NH)	0	1	0.00%	0.16%
Native American or Alaska Native alone (NH)	0	0	0.00%	0.00%
Asian alone (NH)	2	2	0.20%	0.31%
Native Hawaiian or Pacific Islander alone (NH)	0	0	0.00%	0.00%
Other race alone (NH)	0	1	0.00%	0.16%
Mixed race or Multiracial (NH)	0	8	0.00%	1.25%
Hispanic or Latino (any race)	985	606	96.85%	94.39%
Total	1,017	642	100.00%	100.00%
