= Houston Stallions =

Indoor football team in Houston, Texas

- Founded: 2010
- Folded: 2012
- League: SIFL (2011); LSFL (2012)
- Team history: Houston Stallions (2011–2012)
- Based in: Katy, Texas
- Arena: Merrell Center
- Colors: Red, Black
- Owner: Joe Kramer
- Head coach: Gerald Dockery
- Website: www.GoHoustonStallions.com

The Houston Stallions were a professional indoor football team that competed in the Lone Star Football League (LSFL). Based in Houston, Texas, the Stallions played their home games at the Merrell Center in Katy, Texas.

== 2011 inaugural season ==
In their inaugural season as a member of the Southern Indoor Football League, the Stallions played a truncated home season after problems leasing two previous venues (Texas Southern University's Health and Physical Education Arena and the Nutty Jerry Entertainment Center in Winnie, Texas) caused cancellations of early home games. After much preseason speculation on game days and locations, the Houston Stallions kicked off their inaugural season with a 52-20 win over the Rio Grande Valley Magic.

They finished the regular season 12-0, the only undefeated team in the SIFL.

The Stallions beat the Rio Grande Valley Magic on Monday June 20, 2011 in their first playoff game in dramatic fashion by kicking a game winning 46 yard field goal as time expired. The Stallions rallied from 55-39 down with 10:20 remaining in the fourth quarter to win their first playoff game.

The Stallions lost to the Louisiana Swashbucklers on June 27, 2011 in the Western Conference championship.

For the 2012 season, the Stallions were a charter member of the Lone Star Football League, however midway through the 2012 season, the Stallions announced they had suspended operations indefinitely.

== Season-by-season ==
Season records
Season	W	L	T	Finish	Playoff results
Houston Stallions (SIFL)
2011	12	0	0	1st WC Southwest	Won WC Semi-Finals (Rio Grande Valley); Lost WC Finals (Louisiana)
Houston Stallions (LSFL)
2012	--	--	--	--	--
Totals	13	1	0	(including playoffs)	
