= Harlingen High School =

Public school in Texas, United States

Location
- 1201 Marshall Avenue; Harlingen 78550; United States; 26.2074°N 97.6836°W

Information
- Motto: Cardinal Spirit Never Dies
- Established: 1913
- Principal: Erfain Amaya
- Faculty: 136.60 (FTE)
- Student to teacher ratio: 14.14
- Campus type: Closed campus
- Colors: Red & white & black
- Athletics: Football, marching band, basketball, volleyball, tennis, baseball, softball, track, power-lifting, swimming, soccer, cheer, dance, cross country, golf
- Athletics conference: District 32-6A
- Mascot: Cardinal
- Rivals: San Benito High School, Harlingen High School South
- Mascot Nickname: Big Red and Lady Red
- Website: hhs.hcisd.org

Harlingen High School is a public high school located in Harlingen, Texas, United States. It is part of the Harlingen Consolidated Independent School District and was the first of five HCISD high schools established. HHS was the sole high school from its establishment in 1913 to 1993 when the school split and Harlingen High School South was formed. For the 2024-2025 school year, the school was given a "B" by the Texas Education Agency.

== Athletics ==
The Cardinals are known for their successful football, dance and band programs. The football program has the second most wins of any school south of San Antonio and also has the most playoff appearances of any valley school. The Cardinal football program holds 37 district championships, the most in South Texas. The Harlingen Cardinals compete in the following sports:

- Baseball
- Basketball
- Cheer
- Cross country
- Dance
- Football
- Golf
- Marching band
- Soccer
- Softball
- Swimming and diving
- Tennis
- Track and field
- Volleyball
- Water polo
- Wrestling

== Notable alumni ==
- Leo Araguz, former NFL player
- Parker Coppins, YouTuber
- Sammy Garza, former NFL player, football coach and scout
- Thomas Haden Church (Class of 1979)
- Johnnie Jackson, former NFL player, Super Bowl winning cornerback with the San Francisco 49ers
- Jimmy Lawrence, former NFL player
