= Rio Grande Valley Magic =

Indoor football team in Hidalgo, Texas, US

Logo

General information
- Founded: 2010
- Folded: 2012
- Headquartered: Hidalgo, Texas at the State Farm Arena
- Colors: Royal Blue, Sky Blue, Silver

Personnel
- Owners: Chad Dittman; Joe Kramer
- Head coach: Schuyler Anderson

Team history
- Rio Grande Valley Magic (2011–2012)

Home fields
- State Farm Arena (2011-2012)

League / conference affiliations
- Southern Indoor Football League (2011); Lone Star Football League (2012)

Playoff appearances (2)
- 2011, 2012

The Rio Grande Valley Magic were a professional indoor football team based in Hidalgo, Texas. The Magic were charter members of the Lone Star Football League (LSFL) in 2012, after playing as an expansion team in the Southern Indoor Football League (SIFL) in 2011. The Magic played their home games at the State Farm Arena.

== History ==
In July 2010, team owner Chad Dittman announced that he would be bringing an expansion team of the Southern Indoor Football League (SIFL) to Rio Grande Valley. On August 19, 2010, Dittman announced the team's nickname would be the Magic and that the team would be coached by former NFL quarterback, John Fourcade.

== Head coaches ==
Name	Term	Regular season				Playoffs		Awards
Name	Term	W	L	T	Win%	W	L	Awards
Schuyler Anderson	2011	6	6	0	.500	0	1	
Schuyler Anderson	2012	6	6	0	.500	1	1	

== Season-by-season results ==
League champions	Conference champions	Division champions	Wild card berth	League leader

Season	Team	League	Conference	Division	Regular season				Postseason results
Season	Team	League	Conference	Division	Finish	Wins	Losses	Ties	Postseason results
2011	2011	SIFL	Western	Southwest	3rd	6	6	0	Lost Wild Card 62–65 (Houston)
2012	2012	LSFL			3rd	6	6	0	Won Semifinal 50–47 (Laredo); Lost Lone Star Bowl I 40–62 (Amarillo)
Totals						12	12	0	All-time regular season record (2011–2012)
Totals						1	2	-	All-time postseason record (2011–2012)
Totals						13	14	0	All-time regular season and postseason record (2011–2012)
