= Harlingen High School South =

Public school in Texas, United States

Location
- 1701 Dixieland Road; Harlingen, Texas 78550; United States

Information
- Type: Public
- Motto: Hawk Pride - A Step Above! No Fear All Faith
- Established: 1993
- School district: Harlingen Consolidated Independent School District
- Superintendent: Dr. Steve Flores
- President: Gerry Fluriet
- Principal: Dr. Fernando Reyes
- Faculty: 110.72 (on an FTE basis)
- Grades: 9-12
- Enrollment: 1,571 (2022-23)
- Student to teacher ratio: 14.19
- Campus type: Closed campus, urban
- Colors: Green and orange
- Athletics conference: District 16-5A Division 1
- Mascot: Hawk
- Rivals: Harlingen High School
- Website: south.hcisd.org

Harlingen High School South (HHSS) is a public high school located in Harlingen, Texas, United States. It is part of the Harlingen Consolidated Independent School District. It is one of five public high schools in Harlingen. Harlingen High School was the sole high school until 1993 when the Alamo Ninth Grade Academy officially changed to a high school. It opened under the leadership of Principal Guadalupe Nava, who would remain in that role until retiring in 2010, and graduated its first class in 1994, with more than 350 seniors. Dr. Joe Rodriguez served as Principal from 2010 to 2015 and Dr. Fernando Reyes served as Principal from 2015 to 2025.

For the 2024-2025 school year, the school was given an "A" by the Texas Education Agency.

== Athletics ==
South is known for its successful baseball and volleyball programs. The Harlingen South Hawks compete in the following sports:

- Baseball
- Basketball
- Cross country
- Football
- Golf
- Soccer
- Softball
- Swimming and diving
- Tennis
- Track and field
- Volleyball

In 2007 South High School's baseball team competed in the 5A State baseball championship.

In 2021, the Hawk football team defeated the Harlingen High School cardinals, for the first time in 14 years, since 2007. The Hawks, under head coach Israel Gonzalez, went undefeated 10-0 in district 32-6A to claim district championship.

== Traditions ==
Homecoming week is designated spirit week with each day allowing the students to dress in a certain fashion not normally acceptable by rule (e.i. Western day, Orange out day, etc.). On the Thursday night prior to the game on Friday, the Student Council holds an annual homecoming parade and bonfire. The event starts with a parade down Dixieland Road featuring floats which representatives from participating clubs ride on. The parade is followed by a special homecoming pep rally. The night concludes with the traditional Burning of the "S" by the Harlingen South FFA. A large steel "S" is wrapped in cloth set up in a field near the school and set on fire. The event closely resembles the Burning of the "H" homecoming tradition at crosstown rival Harlingen High School. Harlingen South broke off from Harlingen High in 1993. The Homecoming Dance, sponsored by the Student Council, is held on the Saturday night following the Friday game.

== See also ==
- Harlingen High School
