= Lone Star Football League =

American indoor football league

- Sport: Indoor football
- Founded: 2011
- First season: 2012
- Folded: 2014
- CEO: Darlene Jones
- No. of teams: 5
- Country: United States
- Last champion: San Angelo Bandits (1st title)
- Most titles: Amarillo Venom (2 titles)
- Related competitions: IFL; SIFL
- Website: TexasLSFL.com

The Lone Star Football League (LSFL) was a regional professional indoor football minor league that played three seasons from 2012 to 2014. All of the LSFL's charter teams were based in the state of Texas, with five teams coming from the Southern Indoor Football League, three from the Indoor Football League, plus one expansion team. The LSFL played three seasons to completion before merging with the Champions Professional Indoor Football League in August 2014 to form Champions Indoor Football.

Individual player salaries were varied in the LSFL, with a total $3,000 team salary cap per game, which averaged between $100 and $450 per player.

== History ==
=== 2012 season ===
The 2012 season began with the Houston Stallions, Amarillo Venom, Rio Grande Valley Magic, Laredo Rattlesnakes, West Texas Roughnecks, Corpus Christi Hammerheads, and Abilene Ruff Riders participating. While a number of the other teams scheduled to launch in 2012 did not make it to the start of the regular season, only the Mesquite Bandits had their franchise revoked rather than fold voluntarily. The Houston team was 7–0 when it folded halfway through the season. The Amarillo Venom finished the regular season 10–4 and went on to defeat the Rio Grande Valley Magic 62–40 in the LSFL championship game. Former Clemson linebacker Antonio Clay was practicing with the West Texas Roughnecks in Odessa, Texas in 2012.

=== 2013 season ===
For 2013, the LSFL played with just five teams. Amarillo, Laredo, Corpus Christi, and Abilene (now known as the Bombers) returned from the 2012 season. The league added two new teams; the expansion San Angelo Bandits and the New Mexico Stars (formerly of the Indoor Football League and the LSFL's first and only team outside of Texas). The league announced in October that the Corpus Christi Hammerheads had been removed from the league due to its ownership violating by-laws. The Amarillo Venom defeated the Laredo Rattlesnakes 70–69 to repeat as league champions. After the season, in late September 2013, the Laredo franchise announced it was ceasing operations due to the financial and legal difficulties of its owner.

=== 2014 season ===
With the Laredo and Abilene franchises failing to return, the LSFL added the West Texas Wildcatters in Odessa and the Rio Grande Valley Sol in Hidalgo to the league.

=== Merger with the CPIFL ===
On August 14, 2014, it was announced at the league website that they merged with the Champions Professional Indoor Football League to create what they say is the largest indoor football league in the country. The merged league became known as Champions Indoor Football.

=== Returning in 2026? ===
On August 25, 2025, Texas native and coach Tom Lewis, who was previously named head coach, general manager and part-owner of the North Michigan Muskies of American Indoor Football, abruptly resigned from that team and announced on his personal Facebook page that he plans on relaunching the LSFL and will have ties to the pre-merger league. He is looking at franchises for Allen, Edinburg, Abilene, San Antonio, Odessa, Wichita Falls, and Waco.

== Teams ==
Map of teams competing in the LSFL

Team	Location	Arena (Capacity)
Amarillo Venom	Amarillo	Amarillo Civic Center (4,912)
Rio Grande Valley Sol	Hidalgo	State Farm Arena (5,500)
San Angelo Bandits	San Angelo	Foster Communications Coliseum (5,260)
West Texas Wildcatters	Odessa	Ector County Coliseum (5,131)

- Abilene Bombers – played in LSFL during the 2012 and 2013 seasons
- Corpus Christi Hammerheads – played in LSFL for 2012 season, franchise revoked by league for multiple violations of league bylaws
- Frisco Falcons – announced for the 2012 season but folded before the schedule was released
- Houston Stallions – Due to the resignations of its general manager and staff, the Stallions were unable to complete the 2012 season
- Laredo Rattlesnakes – played in LSFL during the 2012 and 2013 seasons
- McAllen Toros – originally set to play in 2013 season, never played
- Mesquite Bandits – originally set to play in inaugural 2012 season, franchise revoked by league before season started for lack of preparations for inaugural season as well as breach of franchise agreement
- New Mexico Stars – played in LSFL for 2013 and 2014 seasons, went dormant for one year, and moved to the AIF in 2016.
- Rio Grande Valley Magic – played in LSFL for 2012 season, franchise revoked by league for multiple violations of league bylaws
- West Texas Roughnecks – played in LSFL for 2012 season, folded after new ownership could not be found

== Franchising ==
The LSFL required a $25,000 franchise fee to join, as well as a $25,000 letter of credit.
